= 2003–04 Ulster Rugby season =

- Ground: Ravenhill Stadium (Capacity: 12,500)
- Coach: Alan Solomons
- Captain: Andy Ward
- Top scorer: David Humphreys (204)
- Most tries: Tyrone Howe (12)
- League(s): Heineken Cup (3rd in pool); Celtic League (2nd); Celtic Cup (champions)

The 2003–04 season was Ulster Rugby's ninth under professionalism, and their third under head coach Alan Solomons. They competed in the Heineken Cup, the Celtic League and the inaugural Celtic Cup.

Ulster introduced a new logo this season, featuring a red hand surrounded by the outline shapes of two crossed rugby balls in red and black, which remains in use. A proposal to rebrand the team the "Ulster Knights" was discussed, but rejected.

The numbers of teams in the Celtic League was reduced from sixteen to twelve in a single league table, with a full home and away schedule increasing each team's fixture list from seven to 22 matches. There would be no playoffs to determine the league's champions, but a knockout competition, the Celtic Cup, was introduced alongside the league. This meant that the Irish provinces could now operate as full-time professional clubs, with provincial players no longer able to play for clubs in the All-Ireland League. Ulster finished second in the table. Tyrone Howe was the league's joint third leading try scorer with nine. In the Heineken Cup, they came third in Pool 1, not qualifying for the knockout stage. They won the Celtic Cup, defeating Edinburgh in the final.

Making their debuts for the province this season were props Bryan Young and Simon Shawe, lock Tim Barker, back row forward Roger Wilson, scrum-half Reece Spee, wing Tommy Bowe and centre Seamus Mallon. New signings were props Ronan McCormack and Rod Moore, locks Rowan Frost and Matt Mustchin, and centre Paul Steinmetz.

James Topping became only the second player, after Gary Longwell, to make 100 appearances for Ulster. Tommy Bowe was named IRUPA Young Player of the Year. Roger Wilson was Ulster's Player of the Year.

Head coach Alan Solomons and forwards coach Adrian Kennedy left at the end of the season to join Northampton Saints. Backs coach Mark McCall was named as the new head coach.

== Staff ==
Position	Name	Nationality
Chief Executive	Michael Reid	Ireland
Director of Rugby	Alan Solomons	South Africa
Team manager	John McComish	Ireland
Forwards coach	Adrian Kennedy	Ireland
Backs coach	Mark McCall	Ireland
Assistant conditioning coach	John McCloskey	Ireland
Physiotherapist	Gareth Robinson	Ireland

== Squad ==
=== Senior squad ===
==== Players in ====
- (Ireland) Tim Barker from (Ireland) Dungannon
- (Ireland) Tommy Bowe from (Ireland) Belfast Harlequins
- (New Zealand) Rowan Frost from (Ireland) Connacht
- (Ireland) Seamus Mallon from (Ireland) Dungannon
- (Ireland) Andy Maxwell from (Ireland) Ballymena
- (Ireland) Ronan McCormack from (Ireland) Connacht
- (Australia) Rod Moore from (Australia) Waratahs
- (New Zealand) Matt Mustchin from (New Zealand) Canterbury Crusaders
- (Ireland) Simon Shawe from (Ireland) Belfast Harlequins
- (New Zealand) Reece Spee from (Ireland) City of Derry
- (New Zealand) Paul Steinmetz from (New Zealand) Otago Highlanders
- (Ireland) Roger Wilson from (Ireland) Belfast Harlequins
- (Ireland) Bryan Young from (Ireland) Ballymena

==== Players out ====
- (Ireland) Mark Blair to (France) Narbonne
- (Ireland) Sheldon Coulter released
- (Ireland) Jan Cunningham released
- (Ireland) Jeremy Davidson retired
- (Ireland) Justin Fitzpatrick to (France) Castres
- (South Africa) Russell Nelson to (Italy) Padova
- (Ireland) David Spence released

Ulster Rugby squad
**Props**: (Australia) **Rod Moore** (27 apps, 21 starts); (Ireland) **Simon Best** (17 apps, 14 starts, 10 pts); (South Africa) **Robbi Kempson** (13 apps, 12 starts); (Ireland) Ronan McCormack (15 apps, 9 starts, 5 pts); (Ireland) Bryan Young (10 apps, 6 starts); (Ireland) Simon Shawe (2 apps); (Ireland) Clem Boyd; **Hookers**: (New Zealand) Matt Sexton (25 apps, 20 starts, 10 pts); (Ireland) **Paul Shields** (26 apps, 11 starts, 15 pts); (Ireland) Nigel Brady; **Locks**: (New Zealand) Matt Mustchin (26 apps, 18 starts); (Ireland) Matt McCullough (21 apps, 17 starts, 5 pts); (New Zealand) Rowan Frost* (25 apps, 16 starts, 10 pts); (Ireland) **Gary Longwell** (13 apps, 11 starts); (Ireland) Tim Barker (2 apps)	**Back row**: (Ireland) **Andy Ward** (c) (30 apps, 30 starts, 30 pts); (Ireland) Neil Best (30 apps, 26 starts, 25 pts); (Ireland) Roger Wilson (26 apps, 20 starts, 5 pts); (Ireland) Tony McWhirter (10 apps, 9 starts, 10 pts); (Ireland) Neil McMillan (13 apps, 8 starts, 20 pts); (South Africa) **Warren Brosnihan** (8 apps, 10 pts); (Ireland) Gary Brown; **Scrum-halves**: (Ireland) Neil Doak (21 apps, 17 starts); (Ireland) Kieran Campbell (17 apps, 11 starts); (New Zealand) Reece Spee* (3 apps); **Fly-halves**: (Ireland) **David Humphreys** (15 apps, 15 starts, 204 pts); (Australia) Adam Larkin (22 apps, 15 starts, 165 pts)	**Centres**: (New Zealand) Shane Stewart (24 apps, 22 starts, 20 pts); (New Zealand) Paul Steinmetz (21 apps, 20 starts, 5 pts); (Australia) **Ryan Constable** (12 apps, 10 starts, 45 pts); (Ireland) Seamus Mallon (12 apps, 7 starts, 5 pts); (Ireland) **Jonny Bell**; **Wings**: (Ireland) **James Topping** (25 apps, 23 starts, 10 pts); (Ireland) **Tyrone Howe** (21 apps, 21 starts, 60 pts); (Ireland) Scott Young (20 apps, 17 starts_; (Ireland) Tommy Bowe (2 apps, 1 start, 5 pts); (Ireland) Andy Maxwell; **Fullbacks**: (Ireland) Bryn Cunningham (27 apps, 26 starts, 25 pts); (Ireland) Paddy Wallace (19 apps, 9 starts, 70 pts)
(c) denotes the team captain, **Bold** denotes internationally capped players.^{*} denotes players qualified to play for Ireland on residency or dual nationality.

== Season record ==
Competition	Played	Won	Drawn	Lost	PF	PA	PD	TF	TA
2003-04 Heineken Cup	6	3	0	3	109	106	3	10	9
2003-04 Celtic League	22	15	0	7	617	363	254	67	29
2003-04 Celtic Cup	3	3	0	0	70	57	13	6	6
Total	31	21	0	10	796	526	270	83	44

== 2003–04 Heineken Cup ==
=== Pool 1 ===
Team	P	W	D	L	Tries for	Tries against	Try diff	Points for	Points against	Points diff	TB	LB	Pts
(France) Stade Français	6	4	0	2	11	8	3	134	80	54	1	1	18
(England) Leicester Tigers	6	3	0	3	17	10	7	137	115	22	3	0	15
(Ireland) Ulster	6	3	0	3	10	9	1	109	106	3	1	1	14
(Wales) Newport Gwent Dragons	6	2	0	4	5	16	−11	67	146	−79	0	1	9

7 December 2003	Newport Gwent Dragons (Wales)	24 – 15	(Ireland) Ulster	Rodney Parade, Newport
14:30	Try: Breeze; Montgomery; Con: Jarvis	Report; Match centre	Pen: Humphreys (5)	Attendance: 5,500
Ulster lineup: 1. Robbi Kempson, 2. Matt Sexton, 3. Simon Best, 4. Rowan Frost, 5. Gary Longwell, 6. Andy Ward (c), 7. Neil Best, 8. Roger Wilson, 9. Neil Doak, 10. David Humphreys, 11. Tyrone Howe, 12. Paul Steinmetz, 13. Ryan Constable, 14. James Topping, 15. Bryn Cunningham.; Replacements: Paul Shields (for Sexton 40'), Matt Mustchin (for Longwell 56'), Rod Moore (for N. Best 29-36').				Attendance: 5,500

12 December 2003	Ulster (Ireland)	22 – 20	(France) Stade Français	Ravenhill, Belfast
19:30	Try: Wallace; Con: Humphreys; Pen: Humphreys (5)	Report; Match centre	Try: Rabadan; Pen: Domínguez (4); Drop: Liebenburg	Attendance: 10,243; Referee: N Williams
Ulster lineup: 1. Robbi Kempson, 2. Matt Sexton, 3. Simon Best, 4. Gary Longwell, 5. Rowan Frost, 6. Andy Ward (c), 7. Neil Best, 8. Roger Wilson, 9. Neil Doak, 10. David Humphreys, 11. Tyrone Howe, 12. Paul Steinmetz, 13. Shane Stewart, 14. James Topping, 15. Bryn Cunningham.; Replacements: Rod Moore (for S. Best 57'), Matt Mustchin (for Longwell 57'), Paddy Wallace (for Cunningham 62').				Attendance: 10,243; Referee: N Williams

11 January 2004	Ulster (Ireland)	33 – 0	(England) Leicester Tigers	Ravenhill, Belfast
13:00	Try: Howe; Ward (2); Stewart; Con: Humphreys (2); Pen: Humphreys (3)	Report; Match centre		Attendance: 12,300
Ulster lineup: 1. Robbi Kempson, 2. Matt Sexton, 3. Simon Best, 4. Matt Mustchin, 5. Rowan Frost, 6. Andy Ward (c), 7. Neil Best, 8. Roger Wilson, 9. Neil Doak, 10. David Humphreys, 11. Tyrone Howe, 12. Paul Steinmetz, 13. Shane Stewart, 14. James Topping, 15. Paddy Wallace.; Replacements: Matt McCullough (for Mustchin 67'), Adam Larkin (for Stewart 75').				Attendance: 12,300

17 January 2004	Leicester Tigers (England)	49 – 7	(Ireland) Ulster	Welford Road, Leicester
15:00	Try: Lloyd (2); Back; Van der Westhuyzen; Johnson; Con: Vesty (3); Pen: Vesty (6)	Report; Match centre	Try: Topping; Con: Humphreys	Attendance: 16,815
Ulster lineup: 1. Robbi Kempson, 2. Matt Sexton, 3. Simon Best, 4. Matt Mustchin, 5. Rowan Frost, 6. Andy Ward (c), 7. Neil Best, 8. Roger Wilson, 9. Neil Doak, 10. David Humphreys, 11. Tyrone Howe, 12. Paul Steinmetz, 13. Shane Stewart, 14. James Topping, 15. Paddy Wallace.; Replacements: Adam Larkin (for Stewart 18'), Rod Moore (for S. Best 50'), Paul Shields (for Sexton 66').				Attendance: 16,815

24 January 2004	Stade Français (France)	13 – 10	(Ireland) Ulster	Stade Jean-Bouin, Paris
16:00	Try: Marconnet; Con: Domínguez; Pen: Domínguez (2)	Report; Match centre	Try: Humphreys; Con: Humphreys; Pen: Humphreys	Attendance: 10,284
Ulster lineup: 1. Robbi Kempson, 2. Paul Shields, 3. Rod Moore, 4. Matt McCullough, 5. Gary Longwell, 6. Andy Ward (c), 7. Neil McMillan, 8. Roger Wilson, 9. Neil Doak, 10. David Humphreys, 11. Tyrone Howe, 12. Paul Steinmetz, 13. Seamus Mallon, 14. James Topping, 15. Bryn Cunningham.; Replacements: Matt Mustchin (for Longwell 64'), Neil Best (for McMillan 64').				Attendance: 10,284

30 January 2004	Ulster (Ireland)	22 – 0	(Wales) Newport Gwent Dragons	Ravenhill, Belfast
	Try: Shields; Humphreys; Howe; Con: Humphreys (2); Pen: Humphreys	Report; Match centre		Attendance: 11,925; Referee: J Dume
Ulster lineup: 1. Robbi Kempson, 2. Paul Shields, 3. Rod Moore, 4. Gary Longwell, 5. Matt McCullough, 6. Andy Ward (c), 7. Neil Best, 8. Roger Wilson, 9. Neil Doak, 10. David Humphreys, 11. Tyrone Howe, 12. Paul Steinmetz, 13. Seamus Mallon, 14. James Topping, 15. Bryn Cunningham.; Replacements: Simon Best (for Moore 60'), Matt Mustchin (for Longwell 60'), Adam Larkin (for Humphreys 62'), Matt Sexton (for Shields 69'), Warren Brosnihan (for N. Best 70'), Kieran Campbell (for Doak 72'), Paddy Wallace (for Mallon 72')				Attendance: 11,925; Referee: J Dume

== 2003-04 Celtic League ==
	Team	Pld	W	D	L	PF	PA	PD	TF	TA	Try bonus	Losing bonus	Pts
1	(Wales) Llanelli Scarlets	22	16	1	5	597	385	+212	57	39	7	3	76
2	(Ireland) Ulster	22	15	0	7	617	363	+254	67	29	8	4	72
3	(Wales) Newport Gwent Dragons	22	16	0	6	590	449	+141	59	41	7	1	72
4	(Wales) Celtic Warriors	22	14	0	8	560	451	+109	48	37	5	4	65
5	(Wales) Neath-Swansea Ospreys	22	11	1	10	582	512	+70	55	60	5	4	55
6	(Wales) Cardiff Blues	22	11	0	11	570	467	+103	73	54	7	3	54
7	(Ireland) Munster	22	10	0	12	422	456	−34	45	49	6	5	51
8	(Ireland) Leinster	22	9	1	12	523	580	−57	51	65	4	5	47
9	(Ireland) Connacht	22	8	2	12	479	550	−71	50	59	5	3	44
10	(Scotland) Edinburgh	22	9	0	13	454	622	−168	52	69	6	2	44
11	(Scotland) Glasgow	22	6	1	15	442	614	−172	52	61	3	3	32
12	(Scotland) Borders	22	4	0	18	363	750	−387	42	88	1	5	22
Under the standard bonus point system, points are awarded as follows: 4 points for a win; 2 points for a draw; 1 bonus point for scoring 4 tries (or more) (Try bonus); 1 bonus point for losing by 7 points (or fewer) (Losing bonus)
Source: RaboDirect PRO12

5 September 2003	Neath-Swansea Ospreys (Wales)	41–30	(Ireland) Ulster	The Gnoll, Neath
19:05	Try: Tiueti; Durston; Henson (2); Con: Connor (2); Henson; Pen: Connor (4); Henson	Report; Match centre Video	Try: Stewart; McCormack; Ward; Con: Wallace (3); Pen: Wallace (3)	Attendance: 4,250; Referee: Gregg Davies
Ulster lineup: 1. Ronan McCormack, 2. Matt Sexton, 3. Rod Moore, 4. Gary Longwell, 5. Rowan Frost, 6. Andy Ward (c), 7. Neil Best, 8. Roger Wilson, 9. Neil Doak, 10. Paddy Wallace, 11. Tyrone Howe, 12. Shane Stewart, 13. Ryan Constable, 14. Scott Young, 15. Bryn Cunningham.; Replacements: Neil McMillan (for Wilson 46'), Paul Shields (for Sexton 53'), Adam Larkin (for Constable 66'), Seamus Mallon (for Stewart 85').				Attendance: 4,250; Referee: Gregg Davies

12 September 2003	Ulster (Ireland)	33–6	(Scotland) Glasgow	Ravenhill, Belfast
19:35	Try: Frost; McWhirter; Stewart; Con: Larkin (3); Pen: Larkin (3)	Report; Match centre	Pen: Howarth; Drop: Moffat	Attendance: 6,000
Ulster lineup: 1. Ronan McCormack, 2. Matt Sexton, 3. Rod Moore, 4. Matt Mustchin, 5. Rowan Frost, 6. Andy Ward (c), 7. Neil McMillan, 8. Tony McWhirter, 9. Kieran Campbell, 10. Adam Larkin, 11. Scott Young, 12. Shane Stewart, 13. Ryan Constable, 14. James Topping, 15. Bryn Cunningham.; Replacements: Seamus Mallon (for Constable 23').				Attendance: 6,000

26 September 2003	Ulster (Ireland)	37–18	(Wales) Newport Gwent Dragons	Ravenhill, Belfast
19:30	Try: Ward; McWhirter; Constable; Howe; Con: Larkin (4); Pen: Larkin (3); Cards: Young (yellow card)	Report; Match centre	Try: Arasa; Baber; Con: Warlow; Pen: Warlow; Drop: Warlow	Attendance: 5,807; Referee: A. Ireland
Ulster lineup: 1. Ronan McCormack, 2. Matt Sexton, 3. Brian Young, 4. Matt Mustchin, 5. Rowan Frost, 6. Tony McWhirter, 7. Andy Ward (c), 8. Roger Wilson, 9. Kieran Campbell, 10. Adam Larkin, 11. Tyrone Howe, 12. Shane Stewart, 13. Ryan Constable, 14. Scott Young, 15. Bryn Cunningham.; Replacements: Paul Shields (for Sexton 40'), Matt McCullough (for Frost 52'), Simon Shawe (for McWhirter 69'), Seamus Mallon (for Stewart 72'), Reece Spee (for Campbell 76'), Neil Best (for Shawe 80').				Attendance: 5,807; Referee: A. Ireland

10 October 2003	Munster (Ireland)	15–16	(Ireland) Ulster	Musgrave Park, Cork
19:30	Pen: Staunton (5)	Report; Match centre	Try: Mallon; Con: Larkin; Pen: Larkin (3); Cards: McCormack (yellow card); McCullough (yellow card)	Attendance: 4,000; Referee: Nigel Owens
Ulster lineup: 1. Ronan McCormack, 2. Paul Shields, 3. Rod Moore, 4. Matt Mustchin, 5. Matt McCullough, 6. Andy Ward (c), 7. Neil Best, 8. Tony McWhirter, 9. Kieran Campbell, 10. Adam Larkin, 11. Tyrone Howe, 12. Shane Stewart, 13. Seamus Mallon, 14. Scott Young, 15. Bryn Cunningham.; Replacements: Ryan Constable (for Mallon 60'), Roger Wilson (for McWhirter 60'), Rowan Frost (for Mustchin 62'), Bryan Young (for Moore 73').				Attendance: 4,000; Referee: Nigel Owens

17 October 2003	Ulster (Ireland)	26–20	(Wales) Celtic Warriors	Ravenhill, Belfast
19:30	Try: Howe; Cunningham; Con: Larkin (2); Pen: Larkin (4)	Report; Match centre	Try: Lewis; Pen: Jenkins (5)	Attendance: 6,625; Referee: D. Changeleng
Ulster lineup: 1. Ronan McCormack, 2. Paul Shields, 3. Rod Moore, 4. Matt Mustchin, 5. Matt McCullough, 6. Andy Ward (c), 7. Neil Best, 8. Tony McWhirter, 9. Kieran Campbell, 10. Adam Larkin, 11. Tyrone Howe, 12. Shane Stewart, 13. Seamus Mallon, 14. Scott Young, 15. Bryn Cunningham.; Replacements: Matt Sexton (for Shields 47'), Roger Wilson (for McWhirter 47'), James Topping (for Young 47'), Ryan Constable (for Mallon 47'), Bryan Young (for McCormack 63'), Rowan Frost (for Mustchin 60'), Reece Spee (for Campbell 77').				Attendance: 6,625; Referee: D. Changeleng

24 October 2003	Edinburgh (Scotland)	3–41	(Ireland) Ulster	Meadowbank, Edinburgh
19:35	Pen: Lee; Cards: Lee (yellow card)	Report; Match centre	Try: Constable (3); Howe; Topping; Con: Larkin (5); Pen: Larkin (2); Cards: Howe (yellow card)	Attendance: 2,600
Ulster lineup: 1. Bryan Young, 2. Paul Shields, 3. Rod Moore, 4. Matt Mustchin, 5. Matt McCullough, 6. Andy Ward (c), 7. Neil Best, 8. Tony McWhirter, 9. Kieran Campbell, 10. Adam Larkin, 11. Tyrone Howe, 12. Shane Stewart, 13. Ryan Constable, 14. James Topping, 15. Bryn Cunningham.; Replacements: Matt Sexton (for Shields), Ronan McCormack, Rowan Frost (for Mustchin), Roger Wilson (for McWhirter), Reece Spee (for Campbell), Seamus Mallon (for Stewart), Scott Young (for Topping).				Attendance: 2,600

31 October 2003	Ulster (Ireland)	32–7	(Wales) Cardiff Blues	Ravenhill, Belfast
19:30	Try: Cunningham (2); Howe; Shields; Con: Larkin (3); Pen: Larkin (2)	Report; Match centre	Try: Powell; Con: Robinson	Attendance: 5,256
Ulster lineup: 1. Bryan Young, 2. Matt Sexton, 3. Rod Moore, 4. Matt Mustchin, 5. Matt McCullough, 6. Andy Ward (c), 7. Neil Best, 8. Tony McWhirter, 9. Kieran Campbell, 10. Adam Larkin, 11. Tyrone Howe, 12. Shane Stewart, 13. Ryan Constable, 14. James Topping, 15. Bryn Cunningham.; Replacements: Paul Shields (for Sexton 55'), Ronan McCormack (for B. Young 63'), Rowan Frost (for McCullough 63'), Roger Wilson (for McWhirter 55), Reece Spee, Seamus Mallon, Scott Young.				Attendance: 5,256

8 November 2003	Connacht (Ireland)	31–20	(Ireland) Ulster	The Sportsground, Galway
14:30	Try: Mostyn; Con: McHugh; Pen: Elwood (2); McHugh (6); Cards: Fogarty (yellow card)	Report; Match centre	Try: Constable (2); Con: Larkin (2); Pen: Larkin (2); Cards: Ward (yellow card); N. Best (yellow card)	Attendance: 1,950
Ulster lineup: 1. Bryan Young, 2. Matt Sexton, 3. Rod Moore, 4. Matt Mustchin, 5. Matt McCullough, 6. Andy Ward (c), 7. Neil Best, 8. Tony McWhirter, 9. Kieran Campbell, 10. Adam Larkin, 11. Scott Young, 12. Shane Stewart, 13. Ryan Constable, 14. James Topping, 15. Bryn Cunningham.; Replacements: Paul Shields (for Sexton), Ronan McCormack, Rowan Frost (for Mustchin), Roger Wilson (for McWhirter), Reece Spee, Paul Steinmetz (for Stewart), Seamus Mallon.				Attendance: 1,950

28 November 2003	Ulster (Ireland)	46–5	(Scotland) Borders	Ravenhill, Belfast
19:35	Try: Cunningham; Constable (2); Ward; Shields; Con: Wallace (5); Pen: Wallace (2)	Report; Match centre	Try: Walker	Attendance: 5,585
Ulster lineup: 1. Simon Best, 2. Matt Sexton, 3. Rod Moore, 4. Matt Mustchin, 5. Rowan Frost, 6. Andy Ward (c), 7. Neil Best, 8. Roger Wilson, 9. Neil Doak, 10. Paddy Wallace, 11. Tyrone Howe, 12. Paul Steinmetz, 13. Ryan Constable, 14. James Topping, 15. Bryn Cunningham.; Replacements: Paul Shields (for Sexton 40'), Robbi Kempson (for Moore 45'), Gary Longwell (for Mustchin 45'), Tony McWhirter (for N. Best), Kieran Campbell, Shane Stewart (for Constable 49'), Scott Young (for Steinmetz 71).				Attendance: 5,585

2 January 2004	Leinster (Ireland)	32–30	(Ireland) Ulster	Donnybrook, Dublin
19:35	Try: Contepomi; Costello; Con: O'Meara (2); Pen: O'Meara (6)	Report; Match centre	Try: Howe; Steinmetz; Humphreys; Con: Humphreys (3); Pen: Humphreys (3)	Attendance: 7,000; Referee: Nigel Owens
Ulster lineup: 1. Robbi Kempson, 2. Matt Sexton, 3. Simon Best, 4. Rowan Frost, 5. Matt Mustchin, 6. Andy Ward (c), 7. Neil Best, 8. Roger Wilson, 9. Neil Doak, 10. David Humphreys, 11. Tyrone Howe, 12. Paul Steinmetz, 13. Adam Larkin, 14. James Topping, 15. Paddy Wallace.; Replacements: Paul Shields (for Sexton 65), Rod Moore (for S. Best 65), Matt McCullough (for Mustchin 58), Warren Brosnihan (for N. Best 65), Kieran Campbell (for Doak 62), Seamus Mallon, Bryn Cunningham (for Wallace 69).				Attendance: 7,000; Referee: Nigel Owens

6 February 2004	Ulster (Ireland)	10–9	(Wales) Llanelli Scarlets	Ravenhill, Belfast
19:30	Try: Cunningham; Con: Larkin; Pen: Larkin	Report; Match centre	Pen: Bowen (2); Drop: Phillips	Attendance: 6,603
Ulster lineup: 1. Robbi Kempson, 2. Paul Shields, 3. Rod Moore, 4. Matt McCullough, 5. Rowan Frost, 6. Andy Ward (c), 7. Neil Best, 8. Roger Wilson, 9. Kieran Campbell, 10. Adam Larkin, 11. Scott Young, 12. Paul Steinmetz, 13. Shane Stewart, 14. James Topping, 15. Bryn Cunningham.; Replacements: Matt Sexton (for Shields 46), Simon Best (for Moore 65), Matt Mustchin (for Frost 46), Warren Brosnihan, Neil Doak, Paddy Wallace (for Stewart), Tommy Bowe.				Attendance: 6,603

13 February 2004	Ulster (Ireland)	31–19	(Wales) Neath-Swansea Ospreys	Ravenhill, Belfast
19:30	Try: N. Best; S. Young; Wallace; Brosnihan; Con: Larkin (4); Pen: Larkin	Report; Match centre	Try: Morris; Williams; Tiueti; Con: Henson; Tiueti	Attendance: 5,041; Referee: Rob Dickson
Ulster lineup: 1. Robbi Kempson, 2. Paul Shields, 3. Rod Moore, 4. Matt McCullough, 5. Gary Longwell, 6. Andy Ward (c), 7. Neil Best, 8. Roger Wilson, 9. Neil Doak, 10. Adam Larkin, 11. Scott Young, 12. Paul Steinmetz, 13. Paddy Wallace, 14. James Topping, 15. Bryn Cunningham.; Replacements: Matt Sexton (for Shields 43), Bryan Young (for Wilson 75), Matt Mustchin (for Longwell 53), Warren Brosnihan (for N. Best 59), Kieran Campbell (for Doak 76), Sheldon Coulter, Andy Maxwell.				Attendance: 5,041; Referee: Rob Dickson

20 February 2004	Glasgow (Scotland)	27–25	(Ireland) Ulster	Hughenden, Glasgow
19:30	Try: A. Bulloch; Lamont; Lawson; Con: Howarth (3); Pen: Howarth (2)	Report; Match centre	Try: N. Best; S. Young; McCullough; Con: Wallace (2); Pen: Larkin (2); Cards: Ward (yellow card)	Attendance: 3,189
Ulster lineup: 1. Robbi Kempson, 2. Matt Sexton, 3. Rod Moore, 4. Gary Longwell, 5. Matt McCullough, 6. Andy Ward (c), 7. Neil Best, 8. Roger Wilson, 9. Neil Doak, 10. Adam Larkin, 11. Scott Young, 12. Paul Steinmetz, 13. Paddy Wallace, 14. James Topping, 15. Bryn Cunningham.; Replacements: Paul Shields (for Sexton 14), Bryan Young, Matt Mustchin (for Longwell 59), Neil McMillan (for N. Best 55), Kieran Campbell (for Doak 67), Shane Stewart (For Larkin 56), Seamus Mallon.				Attendance: 3,189

28 February 2004	Newport Gwent Dragons (Wales)	27–19	(Ireland) Ulster	Rodney Parade, Newport
17:30	Try: Jarvis; Luscombe; Con: Montgomery; Pen: Montgomery (5)	Report; Match centre	Try: Wilson; Con: Humphreys; Pen: Humphreys (4); Cards: Kempson (yellow card)	Attendance: 4,016
Ulster lineup: 1. Robbi Kempson, 2. Paul Shields, 3. Simon Best, 4. Gary Longwell, 5. Matt McCullough, 6. Neil Best, 7. Neil McMillan, 8. Roger Wilson, 9. Kieran Campbell, 10. David Humphreys, 11. Scott Young, 12. Paul Steinmetz, 13. Shane Stewart, 14. James Topping, 15. Bryn Cunningham.; Replacements: Nigel Brady, Rod Moore (for S. Best), Matt Mustchin (for Longwell), Warren Brosnihan (for N. Best), Neil Doak (for Campbell), Paddy Wallace, Seamus Mallon.				Attendance: 4,016

5 March 2004	Ulster (Ireland)	36–13	(Ireland) Munster	Ravenhill, Belfast
19:35	Try: Sexton; Wallace; McMillan; S. Young; Con: Wallace (2); Pen: Larkin (4)	Report; Match centre	Try: Murphy; Con: Lawler; Pen: Lawler (2)	Attendance: 8,820
Ulster lineup: 1. Ronan McCormack, 2. Paul Shields, 3. Rod Moore, 4. Matt Mustchin, 5. Matt McCullough, 6. Neil Best, 7. Neil McMillan, 8. Andy Ward, 9. Kieran Campbell, 10. Adam Larkin, 11. Scott Young, 12. Paul Steinmetz, 13. Shane Stewart, 14. James Topping, 15. Bryn Cunningham.; Replacements: Matt Sexton (for Shields), Bryan Young (for McCormack), Rowan Frost, Warren Brosnihan (for N. Best), Neil Doak, Paddy Wallace (for Cunningham), Seamus Mallon (for Stewart).				Attendance: 8,820

12 March 2004	Celtic Warriors (Wales)	0–28	(Ireland) Ulster	Brewery Field, Bridgend
19:05		Report; Match centre	Try: Humphreys; Stewart; McMillan; Con: Humphreys (2); Pen: Humphreys (3)	Attendance: 2,000
Ulster lineup: 1. Simon Best, 2. Matt Sexton, 3. Rod Moore, 4. Matt Mustchin, 5. Matt McCullough, 6. Andy Ward, 7. Neil McMillan, 8. Roger Wilson, 9. Neil Doak, 10. David Humphreys, 11. Scott Young, 12. Paul Steinmetz, 13. Shane Stewart, 14. James Topping, 15. Bryn Cunningham.; Replacements: Paul Shields, Ronan McCormack (for Moore), Rowan Frost (for Mustchin), Neil Best (for McMillan), Kieran Campbell (for Topping), Adam Larkin (for Humphreys), Paddy Wallace (for Cunningham).				Attendance: 2,000

26 March 2004	Ulster (Ireland)	37–0	(Scotland) Edinburgh	Ravenhill, Belfast
19:30	Try: Howe (2); Larkin; Sexton; Wallace; Con: Larkin (3); Pen: Larkin (2)	Report; Match centre	Cards: Burns (yellow card)	Attendance: 6,328
Ulster lineup: 1. Ronan McCormack, 2. Matt Sexton, 3. Rod Moore, 4. Rowan Frost, 5. Matt McCullough, 6. Neil Best, 7. Neil McMillan, 8. Andy Ward, 9. Kieran Campbell, 10. Adam Larkin, 11. Tyrone Howe, 12. Paul Steinmetz, 13. Shane Stewart, 14. James Topping, 15. Bryn Cunningham.; Replacements: Paul Shields (for Sexton), Bryan Young, Gary Longwell (for Frost), Warren Brosnihan (for Ward), Neil Doak (for Campbell), Paddy Wallace (for Cunningham), Scott Young (for Howe).				Attendance: 6,328

3 April 2004	Cardiff Blues (Wales)	19–15	(Ireland) Ulster	Cardiff Arms Park
17:30	Try: Shanklin (2); Williams; Con: Robinson; Harris; Cards: Robinson (yellow card); Williams (yellow card)	Report; Match centre	Try: Brosnihan; S. Best; Con: Humphreys; Drop: Humphreys	Attendance: 4,500; Referee: Gregg Davies
Ulster lineup: 1. Simon Best, 2. Matt Sexton, 3. Rod Moore, 4. Gary Longwell, 5. Matt McCullough, 6. Neil Best, 7. Neil McMillan, 8. Andy Ward, 9. Neil Doak, 10. David Humphreys, 11. Tyrone Howe, 12. Paul Steinmetz, 13. Shane Stewart, 14. James Topping, 15. Paddy Wallace.; Replacements: Paul Shields (for Sexton), Ronan McCormack (for Moore), Rowan Frost (for McCullough), Warren Brosnihan (for N. Best), Kieran Campbell, Adam Larkin, Seamus Mallon.				Attendance: 4,500; Referee: Gregg Davies

16 April 2004	Ulster (Ireland)	42–27	(Ireland) Connacht	Ravenhill, Belfast
19:35	Try: Bowe; Ward; Wallace; McMillan; S. Young; Con: Humphreys (4); Pen: Humphreys (3)	Report; Match centre	Try: Munn; McPhillips; Con: McHugh; Pen: McHugh (3); Hewitt (2); Cards: Walls (yellow card)	Attendance: 7,286
Ulster lineup: 1. Ronan McCormack, 2. Paul Shields, 3. Simon Best, 4. Gary Longwell, 5. Rowan Frost, 6. Andy Ward, 7. Neil McMillan, 8. Roger Wilson, 9. Kieran Campbell, 10. David Humphreys, 11. Tommy Bowe, 12. Paul Steinmetz, 13. Seamus Mallon, 14. Scott Young, 15. Bryn Cunningham.; Replacements: Nigel Brady, Rod Moore (for McCormack), Tim Barker (for Longwell), Neil Best (for McMillan), Neil Doak (for Campbell), Paddy Wallace (for Cunningham), James Topping.				Attendance: 7,286

30 April 2004	Borders (Scotland)	15–19	(Ireland) Ulster	Netherdale, Galashiels
19:30	Try: Fairley; Setiti; Con: Vili; Pen: Vili	Report; Match centre	Try: S. Best; N. Best; Pen: Humphreys (2); Drop: Humphreys	Attendance: 1,200
Ulster lineup: 1. Simon Best, 2. Matt Sexton, 3. Rod Moore, 4. Gary Longwell, 5. Rowan Frost, 6. Andy Ward, 7. Neil Best, 8. Roger Wilson, 9. Neil Doak, 10. David Humphreys, 11. Tyrone Howe, 12. Paul Steinmetz, 13. Shane Stewart, 14. Scott Young, 15. Bryn Cunningham.; Replacements: Paul Shields (for Sexton), Ronan McCormack (for Moore), Tim Barker, Neil McMillan (for Ward), Kieran Campbell (for Doak), Paddy Wallace (for Steinmetz), Tommy Bowe (for Cunningham).				Attendance: 1,200

7 May 2004	Ulster (Ireland)	28–6	(Ireland) Leinster	Ravenhill, Belfast
19:30	Try: Howe (2); Humphreys; Con: Humphreys (2); Pen: Humphreys (3); Cards: Frost (yellow card)	Report; Match centre	Pen: O'Meara (2)	Attendance: 12,000; Referee: Nigel Williams
Ulster lineup: 1. Simon Best, 2. Matt Sexton, 3. Rod Moore, 4. Matt Mustchin, 5. Rowan Frost, 6. Andy Ward, 7. Neil Best, 8. Roger Wilson, 9. Neil Doak, 10. David Humphreys, 11. Tyrone Howe, 12. Shane Stewart, 13. Seamus Mallon, 14. Scott Young, 15. Bryn Cunningham.; Replacements: Paul Shields (for Sexton 68), Ronan McCormack (for Moore 73), Tim Barker, Neil McMillan (for Howe 80), Kieran Campbell (for Stewart 79), Adam Larkin (for Mallon 73), Paddy Wallace (for Cunningham 64).				Attendance: 12,000; Referee: Nigel Williams

14 May 2004	Llanelli Scarlets (Wales)	23–16	(Ireland) Ulster	Stradey Park, Llanelli
19:35	Try: Watkins; Pen: Jones (5); Drop: Jones	Report; Match centre	Try: McMillan; Con: Humphreys; Pen: Humphreys (3)	Attendance: 10,000
Ulster lineup: 1. Simon Best, 2. Matt Sexton, 3. Rod Moore, 4. Matt Mustchin, 5. Rowan Frost, 6. Andy Ward, 7. Neil Best, 8. Roger Wilson, 9. Neil Doak, 10. David Humphreys, 11. Scott Young, 12. Shane Stewart, 13. Seamus Mallon, 14. James Topping, 15. Bryn Cunningham.; Replacements: Paul Shields (for Sexton), Ronan McCormack (for Moore), Tim Barker (for Mustchin), Neil McMillan (for N. Best), Kieran Campbell, Adam Larkin, Paddy Wallace (for Cunningham).				Attendance: 10,000

== Celtic Cup ==
=== Quarter-final ===
3 October 2003	Ulster (Ireland)	23 (3 tries) – 23 (2 tries)	(Ireland) Leinster	Ravenhill, Belfast
	Try: Penalty try Howe; N. Best; Con: Larkin; Pen: Larkin (2)	Report	Try: O'Riordan; Brown; Con: Leek (2); Pen: Leek (3)	Attendance: 7,000; Referee: Nigel Owens
Ulster lineup: 1. Ronan McCormack, 2. Paul Shields, 3. Bryan Young, 4. Matt McCullough, 5. Matt Mustchin, 6. Andy Ward (c), 7. Neil Best, 8. Tony McWhirter, 9. Kieran Campbell, 10. Adam Larkin, 11. Tyrone Howe, 12. Shane Stewart, 13. Ryan Constable, 14. Scott Young, 15. Bryn Cunningham.; Replacements: Reece Spee, Seamus Mallon (for Stewart 85), James Topping (for S. Young 65), Simon Shawe (for B. Young 82), Nigel Brady, Roger Wilson (for McWhirter 40), Rowan Frost (for Mustchin 65).				Attendance: 7,000; Referee: Nigel Owens

=== Semi-final ===
15 November 2003	Glasgow (Scotland)	13-20	(Ireland) Ulster	Hughenden Glasgow
	Try: Morrison; Con: Howarth; Pen: Parks; Drop: Parks	Report	Try: Constable; Pen: Larkin (4); Drop: Larkin	Referee: H. Watkins
Ulster lineup: 1. Bryan Young, 2. Matt Sexton, 3. Rod Moore, 4. Matt McCullough, 5. Matt Mustchin, 6. Andy Ward (c), 7. Neil Best, 8. Tony McWhirter, 9. Kieran Campbell, 10. Adam Larkin, 11. Tyrone Howe, 12. Paul Steinmetz, 13. Ryan Constable, 14. James Topping, 15. Bryn Cunningham.; Replacements: Paul Shields, Simon Best (for B. Young 41), Rowan Frost (for McCullough 41), Roger Wilson, Neil Doak (for Campbell 41), Shane Stewart, Scott Young.				Referee: H. Watkins

=== Final ===
20 December 2003	Edinburgh (Scotland)	21–27	(Ireland) Ulster	Murrayfield, Edinburgh
14:30 GMT	Try: Simon Webster; Derrick Lee; Mike Blair; Con: Chris Paterson (3/3)	Report	Try: Neil Best; Rowan Frost; Con: David Humphreys (1/2); Pen: David Humphreys (5)	Attendance: 17,174; Referee: Nigel Williams (Wales)
Ulster lineup: 1. Robbi Kempson, 2. Matt Sexton, 3. Simon Best, 4. Rowan Frost, 5. Matt Mustchin, 6. Andy Ward (c), 7. Neil Best, 8. Roger Wilson, 9. Neil Doak, 10. David Humphreys, 11. Tyrone Howe, 12. Paul Steinmetz, 13. Shane Stewart, 14. James Topping, 15. Paddy Wallace.; Replacements: Paul Shields (for Sexton 58), Rod Moore, Matt McCullough (for Mustchin 68), Warren Brosnihan (for N. Best 74), Kieran Campbell, Adam Larkin (for Topping 58), Bryn Cunningham.				Attendance: 17,174; Referee: Nigel Williams (Wales)

== Home attendance ==
Domestic League					European Cup					Total	
League	Fixtures	Average Attendance	Highest	Lowest	League	Fixtures	Average Attendance	Highest	Lowest	Total Attendance	Average Attendance
2003–04 Celtic League	12•	6,863	12,000	5,041	2003–04 Heineken Cup	3	11,489	12,300	10,243	116,819	7,788

== Friendlies ==
22 August 2003	Ulster (Ireland)	33-3	(England) Orrell	Ravenhill, Belfast
	Try: Maxwell; Wallace; Ward; S. Young; Cunningham; Con: Wallace (4)	Report	Pen: Slemen	Attendance: 4,000

30 August 2003	Ulster (Ireland)	26-33	(England) London Irish	Ravenhill, Belfast
	Try: McCormack; Ward; Wallace; S. Young; Con: Wallace (3)	Report	Try: M. Cannon, M. Horak, D. Armitage, B. Casey; Con: M. Mapletoft (3)	Referee: Alain Rolland

== Ulster Rugby Awards ==
The Ulster Rugby Awards ceremony was held at the Ramada Hotel on 20 May 2004. Winners were:

- Ulster Rugby personality of the year: Alan Solomons
- Ulster player of the year: Roger Wilson
- Club Ulster supporters' player of the year: Andy Ward
- Schools player of the year: John McCall, Royal School, Armagh
- Coach of the year: Kenny Hooks, Royal School, Armagh
- Club of the year: Belfast Harlequins
- Team of the year: Belfast Harlequins 2nd XV
- Youth player of the year: Neville Farr, Banbridge RFC
- Dorrington B. Faulkner Award: Brian Banks
- Merit award: Bob Montgomery and Brian Elliott, Ravenhill grounds staff
- Media liaison of the year: John Dickson, Ballynahinch RFC
