= 2003–04 Celtic League =

- Countries: Ireland; Scotland; Wales
- Champions: (Wales) Llanelli Scarlets (1st title)
- Runners-up: (Ireland) Ulster
- Matches played: 132
- Attendance: 501,875 (average 3,802 per match)
- Tries scored: 651 (average 4.9 per match)
- Top point scorer: Neil Jenkins (Celtic Warriors) (273 points)
- Top try scorer: Jamie Robinson (Cardiff Blues) (12 tries)

Official website
- www.rabodirectpro12.com

The 2003–04 Celtic League was the third Celtic League season, and the first following the formation of the five regional rugby sides in Wales. The Celtic League, having previously been played as a pool stage followed by knockout rounds was restructured into a typical league system, based on home and away games only. The league was won by the Llanelli Scarlets, with all the other Welsh regions finishing in the top 6. Following this season, the Celtic Warriors were bought-out and disbanded by the Welsh Rugby Union, and in subsequent years, only four Welsh sides have competed.

== Teams ==
Location of 2003–04 Celtic League teams in Great Britain and Ireland.
Winners; 2nd–4th place; Other teams

| Team | Stadium | Capacity | City, Area |
|---|---|---|---|
| (Scotland) Borders | Netherdale | 6,000 | Galashiels, Scotland |
| (Wales) Cardiff Blues | Cardiff Arms Park | 12,500 | Cardiff, Wales |
| (Wales) Celtic Warriors | Brewery Field; Sardis Road | 12,000; 8,000 | Bridgend, Wales; Pontypridd, Wales |
| (Ireland) Connacht | Galway Sportsgrounds (Note: Connacht also played three of their matches at Dubarry Park in Athlone.) | 5,500 | Galway, Republic of Ireland |
| (Scotland) Edinburgh | Meadowbank Stadium (Note: Edinburgh played one league game at Murrayfield.) | 7,500 | Edinburgh, Scotland |
| (Scotland) Glasgow | Hughenden Stadium | 6,000 | Glasgow, Scotland |
| (Ireland) Leinster | Donnybrook Stadium (Note: Leinster played one league game at Lansdowne Road.) | 6,000 | Dublin, Republic of Ireland |
| (Wales) Llanelli Scarlets | Stradey Park (Note: Llanelli Scarlets played two of their home games at the Racecourse Ground in Wrexham.) | 10,800 | Llanelli, Wales |
| (Ireland) Munster | Thomond Park; Musgrave Park | 13,200; 8,300 | Limerick, Republic of Ireland; Cork, Republic of Ireland |
| (Wales) Neath–Swansea Ospreys | St Helen's; The Gnoll | 4,500; 6,000 | Swansea, Wales; Neath, Wales |
| (Wales) Newport Gwent Dragons | Rodney Parade | 12,000 | Newport, Wales |
| (Ireland) Ulster | Ravenhill | 12,800 | Belfast, Northern Ireland |

== Table ==
| Pos | Team | Pld | W | D | L | PF | PA | PD | TF | TA | TBP | LBP | Pts |
|---|---|---|---|---|---|---|---|---|---|---|---|---|---|
| 1 | (Wales) Llanelli Scarlets | 22 | 16 | 1 | 5 | 597 | 385 | +212 | 57 | 39 | 7 | 3 | 76 |
| 2 | (Ireland) Ulster | 22 | 15 | 0 | 7 | 617 | 363 | +254 | 67 | 29 | 8 | 4 | 72 |
| 3 | (Wales) Newport Gwent Dragons | 22 | 16 | 0 | 6 | 590 | 449 | +141 | 59 | 41 | 7 | 1 | 72 |
| 4 | (Wales) Celtic Warriors | 22 | 14 | 0 | 8 | 560 | 451 | +109 | 48 | 37 | 5 | 4 | 65 |
| 5 | (Wales) Neath–Swansea Ospreys | 22 | 11 | 1 | 10 | 582 | 512 | +70 | 55 | 60 | 5 | 4 | 55 |
| 6 | (Wales) Cardiff Blues | 22 | 11 | 0 | 11 | 570 | 467 | +103 | 73 | 54 | 7 | 3 | 54 |
| 7 | (Ireland) Munster | 22 | 10 | 0 | 12 | 422 | 456 | −34 | 45 | 49 | 6 | 5 | 51 |
| 8 | (Ireland) Leinster | 22 | 9 | 1 | 12 | 523 | 580 | −57 | 51 | 65 | 4 | 5 | 47 |
| 9 | (Ireland) Connacht | 22 | 8 | 2 | 12 | 479 | 550 | −71 | 50 | 59 | 5 | 3 | 44 |
| 10 | (Scotland) Edinburgh | 22 | 9 | 0 | 13 | 454 | 622 | −168 | 52 | 69 | 6 | 2 | 44 |
| 11 | (Scotland) Glasgow | 22 | 6 | 1 | 15 | 442 | 614 | −172 | 52 | 61 | 3 | 3 | 32 |
| 12 | (Scotland) Borders | 22 | 4 | 0 | 18 | 363 | 750 | −387 | 42 | 88 | 1 | 5 | 22 |
Under the standard bonus point system, points are awarded as follows: 4 points for a win; 2 points for a draw; 1 bonus point for scoring 4 tries (or more) (Try bonus); 1 bonus point for losing by 7 points (or fewer) (Losing bonus)
Source: RaboDirect PRO12

== Fixtures ==
=== Round 1 ===
5 September 2003
19:05

| Neath–Swansea Ospreys (Wales) | 41–30 | (Ireland) Ulster |
| Try: Tiueti; Durston; Henson (2); Con: Connor (2); Henson; Pen: Connor (4); Henson | Report | Try: Stewart; McCormack; Ward; Con: Wallace (3); Pen: Wallace (3) |

The Gnoll
Attendance: 4,250

5 September 2003
19:30

| Glasgow (Scotland) | 23–13 | (Wales) Cardiff Blues |
| | Report |

Hughenden
Attendance: 3,264

5 September 2003
19:30

| Borders (Scotland) | 12–49 | (Wales) Celtic Warriors |
| | Report |

Netherdale
Attendance: 4,000

5 September 2003
19:35

| Leinster (Ireland) | 8–15 | (Ireland) Munster |
| | Report |

Donnybrook
Attendance: 6,000

6 September 2003
16:00

| Connacht (Ireland) | 11–3 | (Scotland) Edinburgh |
| | Report |

Sportsground
Attendance: 1,200

6 September 2003
17:30

| Llanelli Scarlets (Wales) | 35–11 | (Wales) Newport Gwent Dragons |
| | Report |

Stradey Park
Attendance: 4,300

=== Round 2 ===
12 September 2003
19:05

| Newport Gwent Dragons (Wales) | 29–19 | (Wales) Neath–Swansea Ospreys |
| | Report |

Rodney Parade
Attendance: 3,874

12 September 2003
19:30

| Edinburgh (Scotland) | 53–7 | (Scotland) Borders |
| | Report |

Meadowbank
Attendance: 2,800

12 September 2003
19:30

| Munster (Ireland) | 12–19 | (Wales) Llanelli Scarlets |
| | Report |

Thomond Park
Attendance: 5,500

12 September 2003
19:35

| Ulster (Ireland) | 33–6 | (Scotland) Glasgow |
| Try: Frost; McWhirter; Stewart; Con: Larkin (3); Pen: Larkin (3) | Report | Pen: Howarth; Drop: Moffat |

Ravenhill
Attendance: 6,000

13 September 2003
14:30

| Celtic Warriors (Wales) | 29–22 | (Ireland) Leinster |
| | Report |

Sardis Road
Attendance: 4,500

13 September 2003
17:30

| Cardiff Blues (Wales) | 33–17 | (Ireland) Connacht |
| | Report |

Cardiff Arms Park
Attendance: 3,500

=== Round 3 ===
26 September 2003
19:05

| Llanelli Scarlets (Wales) | 27–22 | (Wales) Celtic Warriors |
| | Report |

Stradey Park
Attendance: 4,875

26 September 2003
19:30

| Leinster (Ireland) | 30–33 | (Scotland) Edinburgh |
| | Report |

Donnybrook
Attendance: 2,600

26 September 2003
19:30

| Borders (Scotland) | 22–20 | (Wales) Cardiff Blues |
| | Report |

Netherdale
Attendance: 2,140

26 September 2003
19:30

| Ulster (Ireland) | 37–18 | (Wales) Newport Gwent Dragons |
| Try: Ward; McWhirter; Constable; Howe; Con: Larkin (4); Pen: Larkin (3) | Report | Try: Arasa; Baber; Con: Warlow; Pen: Warlow; Drop: Warlow |

Ravenhill
Attendance: 5,807

26 September 2003
19:35

| Glasgow (Scotland) | 19–30 | (Ireland) Connacht |
| | Report |

Hughenden
Attendance: 3,146

27 September 2003
17:30

| Neath–Swansea Ospreys (Wales) | 33–26 | (Ireland) Munster |
| | Report |

St Helen's
Attendance: 5,200

=== Round 4 ===
10 October 2003
19:05

| Cardiff Blues (Wales) | 22–3 | (Ireland) Leinster |
| | Report |

Cardiff Arms Park
Attendance: 3,500

10 October 2003
19:30

| Edinburgh (Scotland) | 25–16 | (Wales) Llanelli Scarlets |
| | Report |

Meadowbank
Attendance: 2,643

10 October 2003
19:30

| Munster (Ireland) | 15–16 | (Ireland) Ulster |
| Pen: Staunton (5) | Report | Try: Mallon; Con: Larkin; Pen: Larkin (3) |

Musgrave Park
Attendance: 4,000

11 October 2003
14:30

| Celtic Warriors (Wales) | 22–32 | (Wales) Neath–Swansea Ospreys |
| | Report |

Brewery Field
Attendance: 2,500

11 October 2003
14:30

| Connacht (Ireland) | 42–19 | (Scotland) Borders |
| | Report |

Sportsground
Attendance: 2,000

12 October 2003
14:30

| Newport Gwent Dragons (Wales) | 27–5 | (Scotland) Glasgow |
| | Report |

Rodney Parade
Attendance: 3,198

=== Round 5 ===
17 October 2003
19:05

| Newport Gwent Dragons (Wales) | 29–6 | (Ireland) Munster |
| | Report |

Rodney Parade
Attendance: 3,571

17 October 2003
19:30

| Glasgow (Scotland) | 26–25 | (Scotland) Borders |
| | Report |

Hughenden
Attendance: 2,712

17 October 2003
19:30

| Neath–Swansea Ospreys (Wales) | 42–18 | (Scotland) Edinburgh |
| | Report |

The Gnoll
Attendance: 4,525

17 October 2003
19:30

| Ulster (Ireland) | 26–20 | (Wales) Celtic Warriors |
| Try: Howe; Cunningham; Con: Larkin (2); Pen: Larkin (4) | Report | Try: Lewis; Pen: Jenkins (5) |

Ravenhill
Attendance: 6,625

17 October 2003
19:35

| Leinster (Ireland) | 21–6 | (Ireland) Connacht |
| | Report |

Donnybrook
Attendance: 2,100

18 October 2003
14:30

| Llanelli Scarlets (Wales) | 35–20 | (Wales) Cardiff Blues |
| | Report |

Stradey Park
Attendance: 4,966

=== Round 6 ===
24 October 2003
19:00

| Connacht (Ireland) | 20–25 | (Wales) Llanelli Scarlets |
| | Report |

Dubarry Park
Attendance: 2,310

24 October 2003
19:05

| Celtic Warriors (Wales) | 19–12 | (Wales) Newport Gwent Dragons |
| | Report |

Sardis Road
Attendance: 2,100

24 October 2003
19:30

| Munster (Ireland) | 26–10 | (Scotland) Glasgow |
| | Report |

Musgrave Park
Attendance: 2,000

24 October 2003
19:30

| Borders (Scotland) | 21–26 | (Ireland) Leinster |
| | Report |

Netherdale
Attendance: 2,000

24 October 2003
19:35

| Edinburgh (Scotland) | 3–41 | (Ireland) Ulster |
| Pen: Lee | Report | Try: Constable (3); Howe; Topping; Con: Larkin (5); Pen: Larkin (2) |

Meadowbank
Attendance: 2,600

25 October 2003
14:30

| Cardiff Blues (Wales) | 43–6 | (Wales) Neath–Swansea Ospreys |
| | Report |

Cardiff Arms Park
Attendance: 4,300

=== Round 7 ===
31 October 2003
19:05

| Neath–Swansea Ospreys (Wales) | 22–33 | (Ireland) Connacht |
| | Report |

St Helen's
Attendance: 3,050

31 October 2003
19:30

| Glasgow (Scotland) | 10–31 | (Ireland) Leinster |
| | Report |

Hughenden
Attendance: 2,734

31 October 2003
19:30

| Munster (Ireland) | 22–21 | (Wales) Celtic Warriors |
| | Report |

Thomond Park
Attendance: 3,500

31 October 2003
19:30

| Ulster (Ireland) | 32–7 | (Wales) Cardiff Blues |
| Try: Cunningham (2); Howe; Shields; Con: Larkin (3); Pen: Larkin (2) | Report | Try: Powell; Con: Robinson |

Ravenhill
Attendance: 5,256

1 November 2003
14:30

| Llanelli Scarlets (Wales) | 36–20 | (Scotland) Borders |
| | Report |

Racecourse Ground
Attendance: 5,060

1 November 2003
18:00

| Newport Gwent Dragons (Wales) | 34–22 | (Scotland) Edinburgh |
| | Report |

Rodney Parade
Attendance: 3,012

=== Round 8 ===
7 November 2003
19:05

| Cardiff Blues (Wales) | 13–25 | (Wales) Newport Gwent Dragons |
| | Report |

Cardiff Arms Park
Attendance: 4,000

7 November 2003
19:15

| Celtic Warriors (Wales) | 29–23 | (Scotland) Glasgow |
| | Report |

Brewery Field
Attendance: 1,950

7 November 2003
19:30

| Edinburgh (Scotland) | 20–9 | (Ireland) Munster |
| | Report |

Meadowbank
Attendance: 2,300

7 November 2003
19:30

| Borders (Scotland) | 22–16 | (Wales) Neath–Swansea Ospreys |
| | Report |

Netherdale
Attendance: 1,500

7 November 2003
19:35

| Leinster (Ireland) | 31–20 | (Wales) Llanelli Scarlets |
| | Report |

Donnybrook
Attendance: 2,300

8 November 2003
14:30

| Connacht (Ireland) | 31–20 | (Ireland) Ulster |
| Try: Mostyn; Con: McHugh; Pen: Elwood (2); McHugh (6) | Report | Try: Constable (2); Con: Larkin (2); Pen: Larkin (2) |

Sportsground
Attendance: 1,950

=== Round 9 ===
23 November 2003
14:30

| Newport Gwent Dragons (Wales) | 28–19 | (Ireland) Connacht |
| | Report |

Rodney Parade
Attendance: 3,058

28 November 2003
19:05

| Celtic Warriors (Wales) | 19–30 | (Scotland) Edinburgh |
| | Report |

Brewery Field
Attendance: 2,000

28 November 2003
19:30

| Glasgow (Scotland) | 18–31 | (Wales) Llanelli Scarlets |
| | Report |

Hughenden
Attendance: 2,345

28 November 2003
19:35

| Munster (Ireland) | 31–10 | (Wales) Cardiff Blues |
| | Report |

Musgrave Park
Attendance: 5,500

28 November 2003
19:35

| Ulster (Ireland) | 46–5 | (Scotland) Borders |
| Try: Cunningham; Constable (2); Ward; Shields; Con: Wallace (5); Pen: Wallace (2) | Report | Try: Walker |

Ravenhill
Attendance: 5,585

29 November 2003
17:30

| Neath–Swansea Ospreys (Wales) | 25–36 | (Ireland) Leinster |
| | Report |

The Gnoll
Attendance: 4,046

=== Round 10 ===
27 December 2003
14:00

| Glasgow (Scotland) | 16–25 | (Scotland) Edinburgh |
| | Report |

Hughenden
Attendance: 4,384

27 December 2003
17:30

| Cardiff Blues (Wales) | 10–26 | (Wales) Celtic Warriors |
| | Report |

Cardiff Arms Park
Attendance: 6,000

2 January 2004
18:00

| Borders (Scotland) | 15–38 | (Wales) Newport Gwent Dragons |
| | Report |

Netherdale
Attendance: 3,000

2 January 2004
19:00

| Connacht (Ireland) | 0–3 | (Ireland) Munster |
| | Report |

Dubarry Park
Attendance: 3,500

2 January 2004
19:05

| Llanelli Scarlets (Wales) | 28–15 | (Wales) Neath–Swansea Ospreys |
| | Report |

Stradey Park
Attendance: 10,195

2 January 2004
19:35

| Leinster (Ireland) | 32–30 | (Ireland) Ulster |
| Try: Contepomi; Costello; Con: O'Meara (2); Pen: O'Meara (6) | Report | Try: Howe; Steinmetz; Humphreys; Con: Humphreys (3); Pen: Humphreys (3) |

Donnybrook
Attendance: 7,000

=== Round 11 ===
6 February 2004
19:05

| Newport Gwent Dragons (Wales) | 35–14 | (Ireland) Leinster |
| | Report |

Rodney Parade
Attendance: 3,476

6 February 2004
19:15

| Neath–Swansea Ospreys (Wales) | 33–11 | (Scotland) Glasgow |
| | Report |

The Gnoll
Attendance: 2,675

6 February 2004
19:30

| Edinburgh (Scotland) | 10–50 | (Wales) Cardiff Blues |
| | Report |

Meadowbank
Attendance: 2,120

6 February 2004
19:30

| Munster (Ireland) | 29–21 | (Scotland) Borders |
| | Report |

Musgrave Park
Attendance: 3,800

6 February 2004
19:30

| Ulster (Ireland) | 10–9 | (Wales) Llanelli Scarlets |
| Try: Cunningham; Con: Larkin; Pen: Larkin | Report | Pen: Bowen (2); Drop: Phillips |

Ravenhill
Attendance: 6,603

7 February 2004
17:30

| Celtic Warriors (Wales) | 40–17 | (Ireland) Connacht |
| | Report |

Brewery Field
Attendance: 1,500

=== Round 12 ===
13 February 2004
19:00

| Newport Gwent Dragons (Wales) | 15–9 | (Wales) Llanelli Scarlets |
| | Report |

Rodney Parade
Attendance: 4,545

13 February 2004
19:05

| Cardiff Blues (Wales) | 29–19 | (Scotland) Glasgow |
| | Report |

Cardiff Arms Park
Attendance: 4,000

13 February 2004
19:30

| Edinburgh (Scotland) | 17–32 | (Ireland) Connacht |
| | Report |

Meadowbank
Attendance: 1,396

13 February 2004
19:30

| Ulster (Ireland) | 31–19 | (Wales) Neath–Swansea Ospreys |
| Try: N. Best; S. Young; Wallace; Brosnihan; Con: Larkin (4); Pen: Larkin | Report | Try: Morris; Williams; Tiueti; Con: Henson; Tiueti |

Ravenhill
Attendance: 5,041

13 February 2004
19:35

| Munster (Ireland) | 24–13 | (Ireland) Leinster |
| | Report |

Musgrave Park
Attendance: 5,400

15 February 2004
17:05

| Celtic Warriors (Wales) | 29–24 | (Scotland) Borders |
| | Report |

Brewery Field
Attendance: 1,500

=== Round 13 ===
20 February 2004
19:30

| Glasgow (Scotland) | 27–25 | (Ireland) Ulster |
| Try: A. Bulloch; Lamont; Lawson; Con: Howarth (3); Pen: Howarth (2) | Report | Try: N. Best; S. Young; McCullough; Con: Wallace (2); Pen: Larkin (2) |

Hughenden
Attendance: 3,189

20 February 2004
19:30

| Llanelli Scarlets (Wales) | 37–20 | (Ireland) Munster |
| | Report |

Stradey Park
Attendance: 6,169

20 February 2004
19:30

| Neath–Swansea Ospreys (Wales) | 26–14 | (Wales) Newport Gwent Dragons |
| | Report |

St Helen's
Attendance: 2,178

20 February 2004
19:30

| Borders (Scotland) | 24–10 | (Scotland) Edinburgh |
| | Report |

Netherdale
Attendance: 1,800

20 February 2004
19:35

| Leinster (Ireland) | 16–37 | (Wales) Celtic Warriors |
| | Report |

Donnybrook
Attendance: 3,800

21 February 2004
19:00

| Connacht (Ireland) | 18–21 | (Wales) Cardiff Blues |
| | Report |

Dubarry Park
Attendance: 2,676

=== Round 14 ===
27 February 2004
19:05

| Celtic Warriors (Wales) | 16–15 | (Wales) Llanelli Scarlets |
| | Report |

Brewery Field
Attendance: 3,900

27 February 2004
19:15

| Cardiff Blues (Wales) | 59–13 | (Scotland) Borders |
| | Report |

Cardiff Arms Park
Attendance: 3,510

27 February 2004
19:30

| Edinburgh (Scotland) | 40–34 | (Ireland) Leinster |
| | Report |

Murrayfield
Attendance: 2,120

27 February 2004
19:35

| Munster (Ireland) | 15–18 | (Wales) Neath–Swansea Ospreys |
| | Report |

Musgrave Park
Attendance: 8,000

28 February 2004
14:30

| Connacht (Ireland) | 28–28 | (Scotland) Glasgow |
| | Report |

Sportsground
Attendance: 2,500

28 February 2004
17:30

| Newport Gwent Dragons (Wales) | 27–19 | (Ireland) Ulster |
| Try: Jarvis; Luscombe; Con: Montgomery; Pen: Montgomery (5) | Report | Try: Wilson; Con: Humphreys; Pen: Humphreys (4) |

Rodney Parade
Attendance: 4,016

=== Round 15 ===
5 March 2004
19:05

| Neath–Swansea Ospreys (Wales) | 23–11 | (Wales) Celtic Warriors |
| | Report |

The Gnoll
Attendance: 3,336

5 March 2004
19:30

| Glasgow (Scotland) | 48–20 | (Wales) Newport Gwent Dragons |
| | Report |

Hughenden
Attendance: 2,860

5 March 2004
19:30

| Leinster (Ireland) | 18–22 | (Wales) Cardiff Blues |
| | Report |

Donnybrook
Attendance: 2,150

5 March 2004
19:30

| Borders (Scotland) | 40–29 | (Ireland) Connacht |
| | Report |

Netherdale
Attendance: 1,500

5 March 2004
19:35

| Ulster (Ireland) | 36–13 | (Ireland) Munster |
| Try: Sexton; Wallace; McMillan; S. Young; Con: Wallace (2); Pen: Larkin (4) | Report | Try: Murphy; Con: Lawler; Pen: Lawler (2) |

Ravenhill
Attendance: 8,820

6 March 2004
18:00

| Llanelli Scarlets (Wales) | 47–12 | (Scotland) Edinburgh |
| | Report |

Stradey Park
Attendance: 4,792

=== Round 16 ===
12 March 2004
19:05

| Celtic Warriors (Wales) | 0–28 | (Ireland) Ulster |
| | Report | Try: Humphreys; Stewart; McMillan; Con: Humphreys (2); Pen: Humphreys (3) |

Brewery Field
Attendance: 2,000

12 March 2004
19:30

| Edinburgh (Scotland) | 31–35 | (Wales) Neath–Swansea Ospreys |
| | Report |

Meadowbank
Attendance: 2,111

12 March 2004
19:30

| Munster (Ireland) | 6–16 | (Wales) Newport Gwent Dragons |
| | Report |

Thomond Park
Attendance: 4,470

12 March 2004
19:30

| Borders (Scotland) | 11–15 | (Scotland) Glasgow |
| | Report |

Netherdale
Attendance: 1,650

13 March 2004
14:30

| Connacht (Ireland) | 35–24 | (Ireland) Leinster |
| | Report |

Sportsground
Attendance: 3,850

13 March 2004
17:30

| Cardiff Blues (Wales) | 0–6 | (Wales) Llanelli Scarlets |
| | Report |

Cardiff Arms Park
Attendance: 7,000

=== Round 17 ===
26 March 2004
19:00

| Newport Gwent Dragons (Wales) | 20–18 | (Wales) Celtic Warriors |
| | Report |

Rodney Parade
Attendance: 4,366

26 March 2004
19:05

| Llanelli Scarlets (Wales) | 33–33 | (Ireland) Connacht |
| | Report |

Stradey Park
Attendance: 4,522

26 March 2004
19:30

| Leinster (Ireland) | 35–12 | (Scotland) Borders |
| | Report |

Donnybrook
Attendance: 2,384

26 March 2004
19:30

| Ulster (Ireland) | 37–0 | (Scotland) Edinburgh |
| Try: Howe (2); Larkin; Sexton; Wallace; Con: Larkin (3); Pen: Larkin (2) | Report |

Ravenhill
Attendance: 6,328

26 March 2004
19:35

| Glasgow (Scotland) | 12–37 | (Ireland) Munster |
| | Report |

Hughenden
Attendance: 2,645

28 March 2004
16:00

| Neath–Swansea Ospreys (Wales) | 34–13 | (Wales) Cardiff Blues |
| | Report |

St Helen's
Attendance: 3,877

=== Round 18 ===
2 April 2004
19:05

| Celtic Warriors (Wales) | 29–25 | (Ireland) Munster |
| | Report |

Sardis Road
Attendance: 4,157

2 April 2004
19:30

| Edinburgh (Scotland) | 14–19 | (Wales) Newport Gwent Dragons |
| | Report |

Meadowbank
Attendance: 2,942

2 April 2004
19:30

| Leinster (Ireland) | 31–30 | (Scotland) Glasgow |
| | Report |

Donnybrook
Attendance: 3,655

2 April 2004
19:30

| Borders (Scotland) | 8–41 | (Wales) Llanelli Scarlets |
| | Report |

Netherdale
Attendance: 2,000

3 April 2004
14:30

| Connacht (Ireland) | 24–21 | (Wales) Neath–Swansea Ospreys |
| | Report |

Sportsground
Attendance: 2,964

3 April 2004
17:30

| Cardiff Blues (Wales) | 19–15 | (Ireland) Ulster |
| Try: Shanklin (2); Williams; Con: Robinson; Harris | Report | Try: Brosnihan; S. Best; Con: Humphreys; Drop: Humphreys |

Cardiff Arms Park
Attendance: 4,500

=== Round 19 ===
16 April 2004
19:05

| Neath–Swansea Ospreys (Wales) | 60–7 | (Scotland) Borders |
| | Report |

The Gnoll
Attendance: 2,526

16 April 2004
19:30

| Glasgow (Scotland) | 19–44 | (Wales) Celtic Warriors |
| | Report |

Hughenden
Attendance: 2,863

16 April 2004
19:30

| Llanelli Scarlets (Wales) | 51–20 | (Ireland) Leinster |
| | Report |

Stradey Park
Attendance: 5,679

16 April 2004
19:30

| Munster (Ireland) | 17–28 | (Scotland) Edinburgh |
| | Report |

Musgrave Park
Attendance: 4,935

16 April 2004
19:35

| Ulster (Ireland) | 42–27 | (Ireland) Connacht |
| Try: Bowe; Ward; Wallace; McMillan; S. Young; Con: Humphreys (4); Pen: Humphreys (3) | Report | Try: Munn; McPhillips; Con: McHugh; Pen: McHugh (3); Hewitt (2) |

Ravenhill
Attendance: 7,286

17 April 2004
17:30

| Newport Gwent Dragons (Wales) | 48–25 | (Wales) Cardiff Blues |
| | Report |

Rodney Parade
Attendance: 6,055

=== Round 20 ===
30 April 2004
19:05

| Cardiff Blues (Wales) | 60–14 | (Ireland) Munster |
| | Report |

Cardiff Arms Park
Attendance: 4,110

30 April 2004
19:30

| Edinburgh (Scotland) | 19–30 | (Wales) Celtic Warriors |
| | Report |

Meadowbank
Attendance: 1,957

30 April 2004
19:30

| Leinster (Ireland) | 16–16 | (Wales) Neath–Swansea Ospreys |
| | Report |

Donnybrook
Attendance: 1,068

30 April 2004
19:30

| Borders (Scotland) | 15–19 | (Ireland) Ulster |
| Try: Fairley; Setiti; Con: Vili; Pen: Vili | Report | Try: S. Best; N. Best; Pen: Humphreys (2); Drop: Humphreys |

Netherdale
Attendance: 1,200

1 May 2004
14:30

| Connacht (Ireland) | 14–32 | (Wales) Newport Gwent Dragons |
| | Report |

Sportsground
Attendance: 1,790

1 May 2004
17:30

| Llanelli Scarlets (Wales) | 36–26 | (Scotland) Glasgow |
| | Report |

Racecourse Ground
Attendance: 5,422

=== Round 21 ===
7 May 2004
19:00

| Newport Gwent Dragons (Wales) | 54–10 | (Scotland) Borders |
| | Report |

Rodney Parade
Attendance: 5,297

7 May 2004
19:05

| Celtic Warriors (Wales) | 30–26 | (Wales) Cardiff Blues |
| | Report |

Brewery Field
Attendance: 4,650

7 May 2004
19:30

| Edinburgh (Scotland) | 19–17 | (Scotland) Glasgow |
| | Report |

Meadowbank
Attendance: 3,036

7 May 2004
19:30

| Ulster (Ireland) | 28–6 | (Ireland) Leinster |
| Try: Howe (2); Humphreys; Con: Humphreys (2); Pen: Humphreys (3) | Report | Pen: O'Meara (2) |

Ravenhill
Attendance: 12,000

7 May 2004
19:35

| Munster (Ireland) | 39–10 | (Ireland) Connacht |
| | Report |

Thomond Park
Attendance: 3,233

9 May 2004
14:30

| Neath–Swansea Ospreys (Wales) | 15–18 | (Wales) Llanelli Scarlets |
| | Report |

St Helen's
Attendance: 7,632

=== Round 22 ===
13 May 2004
19:05

| Cardiff Blues (Wales) | 55–22 | (Scotland) Edinburgh |
| | Report |

Cardiff Arms Park
Attendance: 3,620

14 May 2004
18:30

| Connacht (Ireland) | 3–20 | (Wales) Celtic Warriors |
| | Report |

Sportsground
Attendance: 2,145

14 May 2004
19:30

| Glasgow (Scotland) | 34–31 | (Wales) Neath–Swansea Ospreys |
| | Report |

Hughenden
Attendance: 2,227

14 May 2004
19:30

| Borders (Scotland) | 10–18 | (Ireland) Munster |
| | Report |

Netherdale
Attendance: 2,000

14 May 2004
19:35

| Leinster (Ireland) | 56–39 | (Wales) Newport Gwent Dragons |
| | Report |

Lansdowne Road
Attendance: 2,520

14 May 2004
19:35

| Llanelli Scarlets (Wales) | 23–16 | (Ireland) Ulster |
| Pen: Jones (5); Drop: Jones | Report | Try: McMillan; Con: Humphreys; Pen: Humphreys (3) |

Stradey Park
Attendance: 10,000

== Leading scorers ==
Note: Flags to the left of player names indicate national team as has been defined under IRB eligibility rules, or primary nationality for players who have not yet earned international senior caps. Players may hold one or more non-IRB nationalities.

=== Top points scorers ===
| Rank | Player | Club | Points |
|---|---|---|---|
| 1 | (Wales) Neil Jenkins | (Wales) Celtic Warriors | 273 |
| 2 | (Wales) Gavin Henson | (Wales) Neath–Swansea Ospreys | 265 |
| 3 | (Wales) Gareth Bowen | (Wales) Llanelli Scarlets | 240 |
| 4 | (Ireland) Brian O'Meara | (Ireland) Leinster | 195 |
| 5 | (South Africa) Percy Montgomery | (Wales) Newport Gwent Dragons | 191 |

=== Top try scorers ===
| Rank | Player | Club | Tries |
|---|---|---|---|
| 1 | (Wales) Jamie Robinson | (Wales) Cardiff Blues | 12 |
| 2 | (Ireland) Conor McPhillips | (Ireland) Connacht | 11 |
| 3 | (Wales) Jason Forster | (Wales) Newport Gwent Dragons | 9 |
| 3 | (Ireland) Tyrone Howe | (Ireland) Ulster | 9 |
| 3 | (Scotland) Sean Lamont | (Scotland) Glasgow | 9 |
