= 2001–02 Ulster Rugby season =

Professional provincial Rugby Union playing season

- Ground: Ravenhill Stadium (Capacity: 12,500)
- Coach: Alan Solomons
- Captain: Andy Ward
- Most appearances: Neil Best, Paddy Wallace (17 each)
- Top scorer: David Humphreys (202)
- Most tries: Ryan Constable (6)
- League(s): Heineken Cup (2nd in pool); Celtic League (semi-finalists); IRFU Interprovincial Championship (2nd)

David Humphreys' scores a Heineken Cup record 37 points against Wasps

The 2001–02 season was Ulster Rugby's seventh under professionalism, and their first under head coach Alan Solomons. They competed in the Heineken Cup, the IRFU Interprovincial Championship, and the inaugural Celtic League. Flanker Andy Ward was captain.

Solomons, former assistant coach of South Africa and the Western Stormers, was appointed in January to succeed Harry Williams in June. Mark McCall remained assistant coach. Former Springboks assistant coach Phil Mack, who had worked with Solomons with the Stormers, was appointed fitness advisor in place of Mike Bull.

Hooker Allen Clarke retired from playing and was named Director of Elite Player Development, establishing Ulster's first academy programme, based at the Sports Institute for Northern Ireland. The first intake consisted of fourteen players.

The Irish, Scottish and Welsh unions agreed a format for the inaugural Celtic League in May 2001. It would involve all four Irish provinces, two teams from Scotland and nine from Wales, organised in two conferences. It would kick off on 18 August, with the final scheduled for 15 December. Celtic league fixtures between Ulster and Leinster, and between Munster and Connacht, would count towards this year's IRFU Interprovincial Championship. The remaining Interprovincial fixtures would take place in April 2002.

In the Celtic League, Ulster finished second in Pool A, qualifying for the playoffs. They beat Neath in the quarter-final, but lost to Munster in the semi-final. David Humphreys was the league's leading scorer with 122 points, and the "leading marksman" with 39 successful goal kicks. In the Heineken Cup, they finished second in Pool 2, missing out on the knockout stage. They finished second in the Interprovincial Championship, qualifying for next season's Heineken Cup. David Humphreys was Ulster's Player of the Year. Lock Gary Longwell made his 100th appearance for Ulster in October 2001.

Ulster Women finished second behind Munster in the IRFU Women's Interprovincial Series. Gillian McAllister and Eryka Wessell made their debuts for Ireland.

== Player transfers ==
=== Players in ===
- (Australia) David Allen from (Australia) Easts
- (South Africa) Robby Brink from (South Africa) Western Province
- (Ireland) Kieran Campbell from (England) London Irish
- (Australia) Mark Crick from (Australia) New South Wales
- (Ireland) Bryn Cunningham from (Ireland) Dungannon RFC
- (Ireland) Jeremy Davidson from (France) Castres
- (Argentina) Leopoldo de Chazal from (Argentina) Tucumán
- (Ireland) Aidan Kearney from (Ireland) UCD
- (Australia) Adam Larkin from (France) Castres
- (Ireland) Matt McCullough from (Ireland) Ballymena R.F.C.
- (New Zealand) Matt Sexton from (New Zealand) Canterbury
- (Ireland) Paddy Wallace from (Ireland) UCD
- (Ireland) Scott Young from (Ireland) Ballymena R.F.C.

=== Players out ===
- (Ireland) Stephen Bell to (England) Bedford Blues
- (Ireland) John Campbell (released to reserve list)
- (Ireland) Allen Clarke (retired)
- (South Africa) Grant Henderson to (South Africa) SWD Eagles
- (Ireland) Dion O'Cuinneagain to (Ireland) Munster

== Squad ==
Ulster Rugby squad
**Props**: (Ireland) Simon Best (17 apps, 17 starts, 5 pts); (Ireland) **Justin Fitzpatrick** (18 apps, 14 starts); (Ireland) Clem Boyd (11 apps, 3 starts); (Ireland) John Campbell (1 app); (Ireland) Bryan Young (2 apps); (Argentina) Leopoldo de Chazal; **Hookers**: (Ireland) Paul Shields (15 apps, 15 starts, 10 pts); (Australia) Mark Crick (4 apps); (Ireland) Nigel Brady (1 app, 1 start); (Ireland) Richard Weir (3 apps); (New Zealand) Matt Sexton (1 app); **Locks**: (Ireland) **Gary Longwell** (15 apps, 13 starts, 5 pts); (Ireland) **Paddy Johns** (10 apps, 8 starts); (Ireland) **Jeremy Davidson** (12 apps, 7 starts); (Ireland) Mark Blair (10 apps, 5 starts, 10 pts); (Ireland) Aidan Kearney (1 app, 1 start); (Ireland) Matt McCullough (1 app)	**Back row**: (Ireland) **Andy Ward** (c) (16 apps, 16 starts, 25 pts); (Ireland) Tony McWhirter (16 apps, 14 starts, 5 pts); (South Africa) Russell Nelson (14 apps, 12 starts, 5 pts); (Ireland) Neil McMillan (12 apps, 5 starts, 5 pts); (South Africa) Warren Brosnihan (2 apps, 2 starts); (Australia) David Allen* (2 apps, 1 starts); (South Africa) Robby Brink (1 app, 1 start); (Ireland) Mike Haslett (1 app); **Scrum-halves**: (Ireland) Neil Doak (14 apps, 14 starts, 15 pts); (Australia) Brad Free* (4 apps, 2 starts, 5 pts); (Ireland) Kieran Campbell (4 apps, 1 starts); **Fly-halves**: (Ireland) **David Humphreys** (13 apps, 13 starts, 208 pts); (Ireland) Niall Malone (2 apps, 1 starts)	**Centres**: (Ireland) **Jonny Bell** (11 apps, 11 starts); (Australia) Adam Larkin* (14 apps, 10 starts, 5 pts); (New Zealand) Shane Stewart (7 apps, 6 starts, 5 pts); (Australia) **Ryan Constable** (12 apps, 4 starts, 30 pts); (Ireland) Stan McDowell (1 app, 1 start); **Wings**: (Ireland) **Tyrone Howe** (16 apps, 16 starts, 20 pts); (Ireland) **James Topping** (10 apps, 10 starts, 10 pts); (Ireland) Sheldon Coulter (10 apps, 7 starts); (Ireland) Jan Cunningham (2 apps, 1 starts); (Ireland) Scott Young; **Fullbacks**: (Ireland) Paddy Wallace (17 apps, 17 starts, 90 pts); (Ireland) Bryn Cunningham (7 apps, 5 starts, 5 pts)
(c) denotes the team captain, **Bold** denotes internationally capped players.^{*} denotes players qualified to play for Ireland on residency or dual nationality.

== Season record ==
Competition	Played	Won	Drawn	Lost	PF	PA	PD	TF	TA
2001-02 Heineken Cup	6	4	0	2	196	142	54	11	6
2001-02 Celtic League	9	5	1	3	241	201	40	21	19
IRFU Interprovincial Championship	2	2	0	0	41	35	6	4	3
Total	17	11	1	5	478	378	100	26	18

== 2001–02 Heineken Cup ==
=== Pool 2 ===
Team	P	W	D	L	Tries for	Tries against	Try diff	Points for	Points against	Points diff	Pts
(France) Stade Français	6	5	0	1	23	4	19	213	64	149	10
(Ireland) Ulster	6	4	0	2	17	11	6	196	142	54	8
(England) Wasps	6	2	0	4	9	9	0	120	186	−66	4
(Italy) Benetton Treviso	6	1	0	5	2	27	−25	102	239	−137	2

29 September 2001	Benetton Treviso (Italy)	28 – 33	(Ireland) Ulster	Stadio Comunale di Monigo, Treviso
15:30	Try: Perziano; Con: Mason; Pen: Mason (7)	Report; Match centre	Try: Ward; Topping; Humphreys; Con: Humphreys (3); Pen: Humphreys (4); Cards: Ward (yellow card) 61'	Attendance: 4,000; Referee: P. Adams
Ulster lineup: 1. Justin Fitzpatrick, 2. Paul Shields, 3. Simon Best, 4. Jeremy Davidson, 5. Gary Longwell, 6. Tony McWhirter, 7. Andy Ward (c), 8. Russell Nelson, 9. Neil Doak, 10. David Humphreys, 11. Tyrone Howe, 12. Jonny Bell, 13. Shane Stewart, 14. James Topping, 15. Paddy Wallace.; Replacements: Ryan Constable (for Stewart, 53), Kieran Campbell (for Doak, 62), Neil McMillan (for McWhirter, 62), Clem Boyd (for Best, 69), Mark Crick (for Shields, 71).				Attendance: 4,000; Referee: P. Adams

5 October 2001	Ulster (Ireland)	42 – 19	(England) London Wasps	Ravenhill, Belfast
18:50	Try: Humphreys; Howe; Con: Humphreys; Pen: Humphreys (6); Drop: Humphreys (4); Cards: Ward (yellow card) 73'	Report; Match centre	Try: Green; Con: Logan; Pen: Logan (4); Cards: Molloy (yellow card) 73'	Attendance: 10,000; Referee: G. Desantis
Ulster lineup: 1. Justin Fitzpatrick, 2. Paul Shields, 3. Simon Best, 4. Gary Longwell, 5. Jeremy Davidson, 6. Tony McWhirter, 7. Andy Ward (c), 8. Russell Nelson, 9. Neil Doak, 10. David Humphreys, 11. Tyrone Howe, 12. Jonny Bell, 13. Shane Stewart, 14. James Topping, 15. Paddy Wallace.; Replacements: Mark Blair (for Davidson, 53)				Attendance: 10,000; Referee: G. Desantis

27 October 2001	Stade Français (France)	40 – 11	(Ireland) Ulster	Stade Jean-Bouin, Paris
14:50	Try: Marconnet; Galthié; Jonnet; Dominici; Con: Domínguez (3); Berthe; Pen: Domínguez (4)	Report; Match centre	Try: McWhirter; Pen: Wallace (2)	Attendance: 6,000; Referee: Steve Lander
Ulster lineup: 1. Justin Fitzpatrick, 2. Paul Shields, 3. Simon Best, 4. Paddy Johns, 5. Mark Blair, 6. Tony McWhirter, 7. Andy Ward (c), 8. Russell Nelson, 9. Neil Doak, 10. Paddy Wallace, 11. Tyrone Howe, 12. Jonny Bell, 13. Shane Stewart, 14. James Topping, 15. Bryn Cunningham.; Replacements: Adam Larkin (for Bell, 54), Gary Longwell (for Johns, 55), Brad Free (for Doak, 66), Clem Boyd (for Fitzpatrick, 69), Neil McMillan (for McWhirter, 69), Sheldon Coulter (for Stewart, 73).				Attendance: 6,000; Referee: Steve Lander

2 November 2001	Ulster (Ireland)	19 – 16	(France) Stade Français	Ravenhill, Belfast
14:50	Try: Howe; Con: Wallace; Pen: Humphreys (3); Wallace	Report; Match centre	Try: James; Jonnet; Pen: Domínguez (2)	Attendance: 13,000; Referee: N. Whitehouse
Ulster lineup: 1. Justin Fitzpatrick, 2. Paul Shields, 3. Simon Best, 4. Gary Longwell, 5. Mark Blair, 6. Tony McWhirter, 7. Andy Ward (c), 8. Russell Nelson, 9. Neil Doak, 10. David Humphreys, 11. Tyrone Howe, 12. Jonny Bell, 13. Paddy Wallace, 14. James Topping, 15. Bryn Cunningham.; Replacements: Adam Larkin (for B. Cunningham, 30), Clem Boyd (for Best, 66), Paddy Johns (for Blair, 68), Neil McMillan (for Nelson, 68).				Attendance: 13,000; Referee: N. Whitehouse

6 January 2002	London Wasps (England)	36 – 32	(Ireland) Ulster	Loftus Road, London
15:45	Try: Denney; Roiser; Waters; Con: A. King (3); Pen: A. King (5)	Report; Match centre	Try: Ward; Constable; Con: Wallace (2); Pen: Humphreys (2); Wallace (3); Drop: Wallace	Attendance: 5,556; Referee: G. Morandin
Ulster lineup: 1. Justin Fitzpatrick, 2. Paul Shields, 3. Simon Best, 4. Paddy Johns, 5. Gary Longwell, 6. Tony McWhirter, 7. Andy Ward (c), 8. Russell Nelson, 9. Neil Doak, 10. David Humphreys, 11. Tyrone Howe, 12. Jonny Bell, 13. Adam Larkin, 14. Sheldon Coulter, 15. Paddy Wallace.; Replacements: Bryn Cunningham (for Humphreys, 40), Ryan Constable (for Larkin, 53), Jeremy Davidson (for Longwell, 53), Neil McMillan (for McWhirter, 59), Mark Crick (for Shields, 62).				Attendance: 5,556; Referee: G. Morandin

11 January 2002	Ulster (Ireland)	59 – 3	(Italy) Benetton Treviso	Ravenhill, Belfast
19:00	Try: Howe (2); Doak (2); Longwell; Constable; Larkin, penalty try Con: Humphreys; Wallace (4); Pen: Humphreys (3)	Report; Match centre	Pen: Mason	Attendance: 12,500; Referee: N. Whitehouse
Ulster lineup: 1. Justin Fitzpatrick, 2. Paul Shields, 3. Simon Best, 4. Paddy Johns, 5. Gary Longwell, 6. Tony McWhirter, 7. Andy Ward, 8. Neil McMillan (c), 9. Neil Doak, 10. David Humphreys, 11. Tyrone Howe, 12. Jonny Bell, 13. Ryan Constable, 14. Sheldon Coulter, 15. Paddy Wallace.; Replacements: Jeremy Davidson (for Johns, 45), Adam Larkin (for Coulter, 58), Mark Crick (for Shields, 69).				Attendance: 12,500; Referee: N. Whitehouse

== 2001-02 Celtic League ==
=== Pool A Table ===
	Team	Pld	W	D	L	PF	PA	PD	TF	TA	Pts
1	(Ireland) Leinster	7	7	0	0	281	114	+167	35	8	21
2	(Ireland) Ulster	7	4	1	2	194	157	+37	19	17	13
3	(Scotland) Glasgow	7	4	1	2	204	172	+32	25	17	13
4	(Wales) Llanelli	7	4	0	3	175	123	+52	14	7	12
5	(Wales) Swansea	7	3	0	4	124	158	−34	9	12	9
6	(Wales) Bridgend	7	3	0	4	161	208	−47	17	25	9
7	(Wales) Pontypridd	7	1	0	6	111	207	−96	8	25	3
8	(Wales) Ebbw Vale	7	1	0	6	134	245	−111	13	29	3
Match points were awarded as follows: 3 points for a win; 1 point for a draw
Green background (rows 1 to 4) qualify for the knock-out stage. Source: RaboDirect PRO12

=== Pool A Fixtures ===
17 August 2001	Ulster (Ireland)	30 – 13	(Wales) Swansea	Ravenhill, Belfast
19:30	Try: Free; Shields; Topping; Con: Humphreys (3); Drop: Humphreys	Report; Match Centre	Try: Payne; Con: Henson; Pen: Henson; Cards: Morgan (yellow card)	Attendance: 6,000; Referee: C. White
Ulster lineup: 1. Justin Fitzpatrick, 2. Paul Shields, 3. Simon Best, 4. Paddy Johns, 5. Gary Longwell, 6. Robby Brink, 7. Tony McWhirter, 8. Andy Ward (c), 9. Brad Free, 10. David Humphreys, 11. Jan Cunningham, 12. Adam Larkin, 13. Jonny Bell, 14. James Topping, 15. Paddy Wallace.; Replacements: 16. Clem Boyd (for Fitzpatrick, 29), 17. Jeremy Davidson (for Johns, 46), 18. Mike Haslett (for Brink, 74), 19. Ritchie Weir, 20. Bryn Cunningham, 21. Ryan Constable, 22. Kieran Campbell.				Attendance: 6,000; Referee: C. White

24 August 2001	Glasgow (Scotland)	25 – 25	(Ireland) Ulster	Hughenden Stadium, Glasgow
19:30	Try: Simpson (2); Nicol; Con: Hayes (2); Pen: Hayes; MLaren	Report; Match Centre	Try: Wallace; Constable; Nelson; Con: Wallace; Humphreys; Pen: Humphreys (2)	Attendance: 6,095; Referee: N Whitehouse (Wales)
Ulster lineup: 1. Justin Fitzpatrick, 2. Paul Shields, 3. Simon Best, 4. Jeremy Davidson, 5. Gary Longwell, 6. David Allen, 7. Tony McWhirter, 8. Andy Ward (c), 9. Brad Free, 10. David Humphreys, 11. Tyrone Howe, 12. Adam Larkin, 13. Jonny Bell, 14. James Topping, 15. Paddy Wallace.; Replacements: 16. Ryan Constable (for Larkin, 49), 17. Kieran Campbell (for Free, 61), 18. Clem Boyd (for Fitzpatrick, 60), 19. Richie Weir (for Shields, 50), 20. Mark Blair (for Allen, 55), 21. Russell Nelson (for Ward, 40), 22. Niall Malone.				Attendance: 6,095; Referee: N Whitehouse (Wales)

28 August 2001	Ulster (Ireland)	26 – 27	(Wales) Llanelli	Ravenhill, Belfast
19:00	Try: B. Cunningham; Pen: Humphreys (7); Cards: McWhirter (yellow card)	Report; Match Centre	Try: Thomas; Evans; Proctor; Con: Jones (3); Pen: Jones (2)	Attendance: 8,000; Referee: B. Dickson
Ulster lineup: 1. Simon Best, 2. Paul Shields, 3. Clem Boyd, 4. Paddy Johns (c), 5. Gary Longwell, 6. Tony McWhirter, 7. Russell Nelson, 8. Neil McMillan, 9. Kieran Campbell, 10. David Humphreys, 11. Tyrone Howe, 12. Paddy Wallace, 13. Shane Stewart, 14. Sheldon Coulter, 15. Bryn Cunningham.; Replacements: 16. Adam Larkin (for Cunningham, 44), 17. Justin Fitzpatrick (for Best, 63), 18. Richie Weir (for Shields, 76), 19. Jeremy Davidson (for Longwell, 44), 20. David Allen (for McWhirter, 63), 21. Neil Doak, 22. Ryan Constable.				Attendance: 8,000; Referee: B. Dickson

31 August 2001	Leinster (Ireland)	31 – 9	(Ireland) Ulster	Donnybrook, Dublin
19:35	Try: O'Kelly; D'Arcy (2); Hickie; Con: Spooner; Pen: Spooner (2); Drop: Dempsey; Cards: Corrigan (yellow card)	Report; Match Centre	Pen: Humphreys (2); Wallace; Cards: Blair (yellow card)	Referee: N Williams
Ulster lineup: 1. Justin Fitzpatrick, 2. Paul Shields, 3. Simon Best, 4. Paddy Johns, 5. Jeremy Davidson, 6. Andy Ward (c), 7. Neil McMillan, 8. Russell Nelson, 9. Neil Doak, 10. David Humphreys, 11. Tyrone Howe, 12. Jonathan Bell, 13. Adam Larkin, 14. Sheldon Coulter, 15. Paddy Wallace.; Replacements: 16. Ryan Constable (for Bell, 56), 17. Niall Malone (for Humphreys, 72), 18. Kieran Campbell (for Doak, 78).; 19. Clem Boyd (for Best, 71), 20. Mark Blair (for Johns, 44), 21. Tony McWhirter (for Ward, 71), 22. Ritchie Weir.				Referee: N Williams

7 September 2001	Ebbw Vale (Wales)	27 – 29	(Ireland) Ulster	Eugene Cross Park, Ebbw Vale
19:05	Try: Betts; Wagstaff; Green; Con: Mitchell (3); Pen: Cull; Mitchell; Cards: Tuipulotu (yellow card)	Report; Match Centre	Try: Howe; Constable; Con: Wallace (2); Pen: Wallace (5)	Attendance: 2,000; Referee: T. Spreadbury
Ulster lineup: 1. Justin Fitzpatrick, 2. Paul Shields, 3. Simon Best, 4. Mark Blair, 5. Jeremy Davidson, 6. Andy Ward (c), 7. Russell Nelson, 8. Neil McMillan, 9. Neil Doak, 10. Paddy Wallace, 11. Tyrone Howe, 12. Adam Larkin, 13. Ryan Constable, 14. James Topping, 15. Niall Malone.; Replacements: 16. Jan Cunningham (for Malone, 70), 17. Shane Stewart (for Constable, 56), 18. Richie Weir (for Shields, 62), 19. Clem Boyd (for Best, 40), 20. Gary Longwell (for Blair 52), 21. Tony McWhirter, 22. Brad Free.				Attendance: 2,000; Referee: T. Spreadbury

12 September 2001	Ulster (Ireland)	46 – 14	(Wales) Bridgend	Ravenhill, Belfast
19:30	Try: Shields; McMillan; Humphreys (2); Stewart; Ward (2); Con: Humphreys (4); Pen: Humphreys	Report; Match Centre	Try: Ringer; James; Con: Rees; Dunston; Cards: Peters (yellow card)	Attendance: 8,000
Ulster lineup: 1. Clem Boyd, 2. Paul Shields, 3. Simon Best, 4. Gary Longwell, 5. Jeremy Davidson, 6. Andy Ward (c), 7. Russell Nelson, 8. Neil McMillan, 9. Neil Doak, 10. David Humphreys, 11. Tyrone Howe, 12. Adam Larkin, 13. Shane Stewart, 14. James Topping, 15. Paddy Wallace.; Replacements: 16. Brad Free (for Doak, 78), 17. Mark Blair (for Davidson, 40), 18. Tony McWhirter (for McMillan, 66), 19. Sheldon Coulter (for Stewart, 68), 20. Ryan Constable (for Larkin, 66), 21. John Campbell (for Boyd, 78), 22. Richie Weir.				Attendance: 8,000

15 September 2001	Pontypridd (Wales)	20 – 29	(Ireland) Ulster	Sardis Road, Pontypridd
14:30	Try: McIntosh; Pen: Sweeney (5)	Report; Match Centre	Try: Best; Constable; Blair; Con: Humphreys; Pen: Humphreys (3); Drop: Humphreys	Attendance: 3,200; Referee: Chris White
Ulster lineup: 1. Simon Best, 2. Paul Shields, 3. Clem Boyd, 4. Gary Longwell, 5. Jeremy Davidson, 6. Tony McWhirter, 7. Russell Nelson, 8. Andy Ward (c), 9. Neil Doak, 10. David Humphreys, 11. Tyrone Howe, 12. Adam Larkin, 13. Shane Stewart, 14. James Topping, 15. Paddy Wallace.; Replacements: 16. Ryan Constable (for Larkin, 63), 17. Justin Fitzpatrick (for Boyd, 61), 18. Mark Blair (for Longwell, 63), 19. Neil McMillan (for McWhirter, 58), 20. Ritchie Weir, 21. Sheldon Coulter, 22. Brad Free.				Attendance: 3,200; Referee: Chris White

=== Quarter final ===
30 November 2001	Ulster (Ireland)	38 – 29	(Wales) Neath	Ravenhill, Belfast
19:05	Try: Blair; Ward; Con: Humphreys (2); Pen: Humphreys (8); Cards: Best (yellow card)	Report; Match Centre; Video	Try: Tiueti; Moore; Con: Jarvis (2); Pen: Jarvis (4)	Attendance: 12,000
Ulster lineup: 1. Justin Fitzpatrick, 2. Paul Shields, 3. Simon Best, 4. Gary Longwell, 5. Mark Blair, 6. Tony McWhirter, 7. Andy Ward (c), 8. Russell Nelson, 9. Neil Doak, 10. David Humphreys, 11. Tyrone Howe, 12. Jonny Bell, 13. Adam Larkin, 14. Sheldon Coulter, 15. Paddy Wallace.; Replacements: 16. Ryan Constable (for Coulter, 52), 17. Clem Boyd, 18. Jeremy Davidson (for Blair, 60), 19. Neil McMillan (for McWhirter, 60), 20. Mark Crick, 21. Kieran Campbell, 22. James Topping.				Attendance: 12,000

=== Semi final ===
8 December 2001	Munster (Ireland)	15 – 9	(Ireland) Ulster	Lansdowne Road, Dublin
15:00	Pen: O'Gara (5)	Report; Match Centre	Pen: Humphreys (3); Cards: Shields (yellow card)	Attendance: 12,500; Referee: I. Ramage
Ulster lineup: 1. Justin Fitzpatrick, 2. Paul Shields, 3. Simon Best, 4. Mark Blair, 5. Gary Longwell, 6. Tony McWhirter, 7. Andy Ward (c), 8. Russell Nelson, 9. Neil Doak, 10. David Humphreys, 11. Tyrone Howe, 12. Jonny Bell, 13. Adam Larkin, 14. Sheldon Coulter, 15. Paddy Wallace.; Replacements: 16. Ryan Constable (for Larkin, 56), 17. Paddy Johns (for Blair, 44), 18. Neil McMillan (for McWhirter, 64), 19. Mark Crick (for Nelson 61-64), 20. Clem Boyd, 21. Kieran Campbell, 22. Bryn Cunningham.				Attendance: 12,500; Referee: I. Ramage

== 2001-02 IRFU Interprovincial Championship ==
Team	P	W	D	L	F	A	BP	Pts	Status
Leinster	3	2	0	1	86	35	2	12	Champions; qualified for 2002–03 Heineken Cup
Ulster	3	2	0	1	50	66	0	8	Qualified for 2002–03 Heineken Cup
Munster	3	1	1	1	64	48	1	7	Qualified for 2002–03 Heineken Cup
Connacht	3	0	0	3	56	107	1	1	Qualified for 2002–03 European Challenge Cup

Celtic League pool matches between Irish provinces count towards the Interprovincial Championship.

22 April 2002	Connacht	17-18	Ulster	The Sportsground, Galway
	Try: Uijs; Pen: McHugh (4)	Report	Try: Constable; B. Cunningham; Con: Wallace; Pen: Wallace (2)	Referee: D. McHugh
Ulster lineup: 1. Justin Fitzpatrick, 2. Nigel Brady, 3. Simon Best, 4. Paddy Johns, 5. Aidan McKearney, 6. Tony McWhirter, 7. Andy Ward (c), 8. Warren Brosnihan, 9. Neil Doak, 10. Paddy Wallace, 11. Tyrone Howe, 12. Adam Larkin, 13. Ryan Constable, 14. James Topping, 15. Bryn Cunningham.; Replacements: Sheldon Coulter (for Topping, 59), Matt McCullough (for McKearney, 59), Bryan Young (for McCullough, 78).				Referee: D. McHugh

12 May 2002	Ulster	23-18	Munster	Ravenhill, Belfast
	Try: Wallace; Doak; Con: Wallace (2); Pen: Wallace (2); Drop: Wallace	Report	Try: O'Connell; Stringer; Con: O'Gara; Pen: O'Gara (2)	Referee: Alan Lewis
Ulster lineup: 1. Justin Fitzpatrick, 2. Matt Sexton, 3. Simon Best, 4. Paddy Johns, 5. Gary Longwell, 6. Warren Brosnihan, 7. Andy Ward (c), 8. Tony McWhirter, 9. Neil Doak, 10. Paddy Wallace, 11. Tyrone Howe, 12. Stan McDowell, 13. Ryan Constable, 14. Sheldon Coulter, 15. Bryn Cunningham.; Replacements: Russell Nelson (for Brosnihan, 69), Bryan Young (for Fitzpatrick, 79),				Referee: Alan Lewis

== Home attendance ==
Domestic League					European Cup					Total	
League	Fixtures	Average Attendance	Highest	Lowest	League	Fixtures	Average Attendance	Highest	Lowest	Total Attendance	Average Attendance
2001–02 Celtic League	4	8,500	12,000	6,000	2001–02 Heineken Cup	3	11,833	13,000	10,000	69,500	9,929

== Friendlies ==
3 August 2001	Ulster	33-15	(England) Coventry	Ravenhill, Belfast
	Try: Bell; S. Best; Ward; J. Cunningham; Hughes; Con: Wallace (4)	Report	Try: Truelove; Brady; Con: Pearce; Pen: Pearce
Ulster lineup: 1. Simon Best, 2. Richie Weir, 3. Clem Boyd, 4. Mark Blair, 5. Aidan Kearney, 6. Tony McWhirter, 7. Russell Nelson, 8. Andy Ward (c), 9. Kieran Campbell, 10. Paddy Wallace, 11. Jan Cunningham, 12. Jonny Bell, 13. Shane Stewart, 14. Sheldon Coulter, 15. Niall Malone.; Replacements: Scott Young (for Malone 40), James Topping, Stan McDowell (for Stewart 40-49), Adam Larkin (for Bell 66), David Humphreys, Neil Doak (for Campbell 40), Andrew Hughes, Mike Haslett (for Nelson 42), Gary Longwell (for Kearney 48), John Campbell (for Best 66). Paul Shields (for Weir 40).

8 August 2001	Ulster	30-17	(England) Sale Sharks	Ravenhill, Belfast
	Try: Shields; Haslett; Larkin; Con: Humphreys; Wallace (2); Pen: Wallace (3)	Report	Try: Cueto; Shepherd; Con: Shepherd (2); Pen: Shepherd
Ulster lineup: 1. Simon Best, 2. Paul Shields, 3. Clem Boyd, 4. Paddy Johns, 5. Gary Longwell, 6. Robby Brink, 7. Tony McWhirter, 8. Andy Ward (c), 9. Brad Free, 10. David Humphreys, 11. Jan Cunningham, 12. Jonny Bell, 13. Ryan Constable, 14. James Topping, 15. Bryn Cunningham.; Replacements: Paddy Wallace (for Humphreys 21), Mike Haslett (for Brink 32), Sheldon Coulter (for J. Cunningham 40), Justin Fitzpatrick (for Boyd 53), Jeremy Davidson (for Longwell 53), Adam Larkin (for Constable 67).

8 August 2001	Ulster	51-24	Munster	Ravenhill, Belfast
	Try: Humphreys; Constable (2); Doak; Larkin; Howe; Con: Humphreys (6); Pen: Humphreys (3)	Report	Try: Horan; Staunton; Con: Staunton; Pen: Staunton (3); Holland
Ulster lineup: 1. Justin Fitzpatrick, 2. Paul Shields, 3. Clem Boyd, 4. Paddy Johns, 5. Jeremy Davidson, 6. Andy Ward (c), 7. Neil McMillan, 8. Ryan Nelson, 9. Neil Doak, 10. David Humphreys, 11. Tyrone Howe, 12. Adam Larkin, 13. Ryan Constable, 14. Jan Cunningham, 15. Paddy Wallace.; Replacements: Tony McWhirter (for McMillan 58), Mark Crick (for Shields 58), Bryn Cunningham (for Wallace 71).

24 November 2001	Connacht	22-16	Ulster	The Sportsground, Galway
	Try: Yapp; Con: Elwood; Pen: Elwood (5)	Report	Try: Larkin; Topping; Pen: Wallace (2)	Referee: E. Walsh
Ulster lineup: 1. Justin Fitzpatrick, 2. Mark Crick, 3. Simon Best, 4. Mark Blair, 5. Gary Longwell, 6. Tony McWhirter, 7. David Allen, 8. Russell Nelson, 9. Neil Doak, 10. Paddy Wallace, 11. Tyrone Howe, 12. Adam Larkin, 13. Ryan Constable, 14. James Topping, 15. Sheldon Coulter.; Replacements: Scott Young (for Topping, 40'), Paddy Johns (for Longwell, 40'), Kieran Campbell (for Doak, 54'), Richard Weir (for S. Best, 64', Clem Boyd (for Crick, 68')				Referee: E. Walsh

== Ulster Rugby Awards ==
The Ulster Rugby Awards ceremony was held on 23 May 2002. Winners were:

- Ulster player of the year: David Humphreys
- Ulster Supporters' Club player of the year: David Humphreys
- Guinness personality of the year: Paddy Wallace
- Ulster schools player of the year: Lewis Stevenson
- Coach of the year: Andre Bester, Belfast Harlequins
- Youth player of the year: Oisin Hennessey
- Club of the year: Ballynahinch RFC
- Dorrington B Faulker Memorial Award for services to rugby: Dick Hinds, formerly of Omagh Academy
- PRO/Media Prize: Terry Jackson, Dungannon RFC

== Season reviews ==
- "Andy Ward's Thoughts On The Season", Ulster Rugby, 15 May 2002, archived 9 July 2002

== Ulster Women ==
Ulster failed to defend their title in the IRFU Women's Interprovincial Series, finishing second to Munster.

18 August 2001	Ulster	3-11	Leinster	Cork
	Pen: Rachel Reid	Report	Try: Bridget Montgomery; Pen: Katie Liston (2)

26 August 2001	Connacht	C-C	Ulster
		Cancelled after Connacht withdrew. Points from the rematch count double.

15 September 2001	Munster	6-0	Ulster	The Sportsground, Galway
	Pen: Norita Duggan (2)	Report	Cards: Laura Nicholl (yellow card) 13'

29 September 2001	Ulster	43-3	Connacht	Ravenhill, Belfast
	Try: Rachel Boyd (2); Laura Nicholl (3); Joy Sparkes; Suzanne Fleming; Con: Rachel Reid (4)	Report	Pen: (1)

13 October 2001	Leinster	5-17	Ulster	Stradbrook Park, Dublin
	Try: (1)	Report	Try: Laura Nicholl; Rachel Currie; Con: Rachel Reid (2); Pen: Rachel Reid

3 November 2001	Ulster	13-5	Munster	Lisburn RFC
	Try: Joy Sparkes; Con: Rachel Reid; Pen: Rachel Reid (2)	Report	Try: Fiona Steed
