= Paddy Wallace =

Rugby union player from Northern Ireland

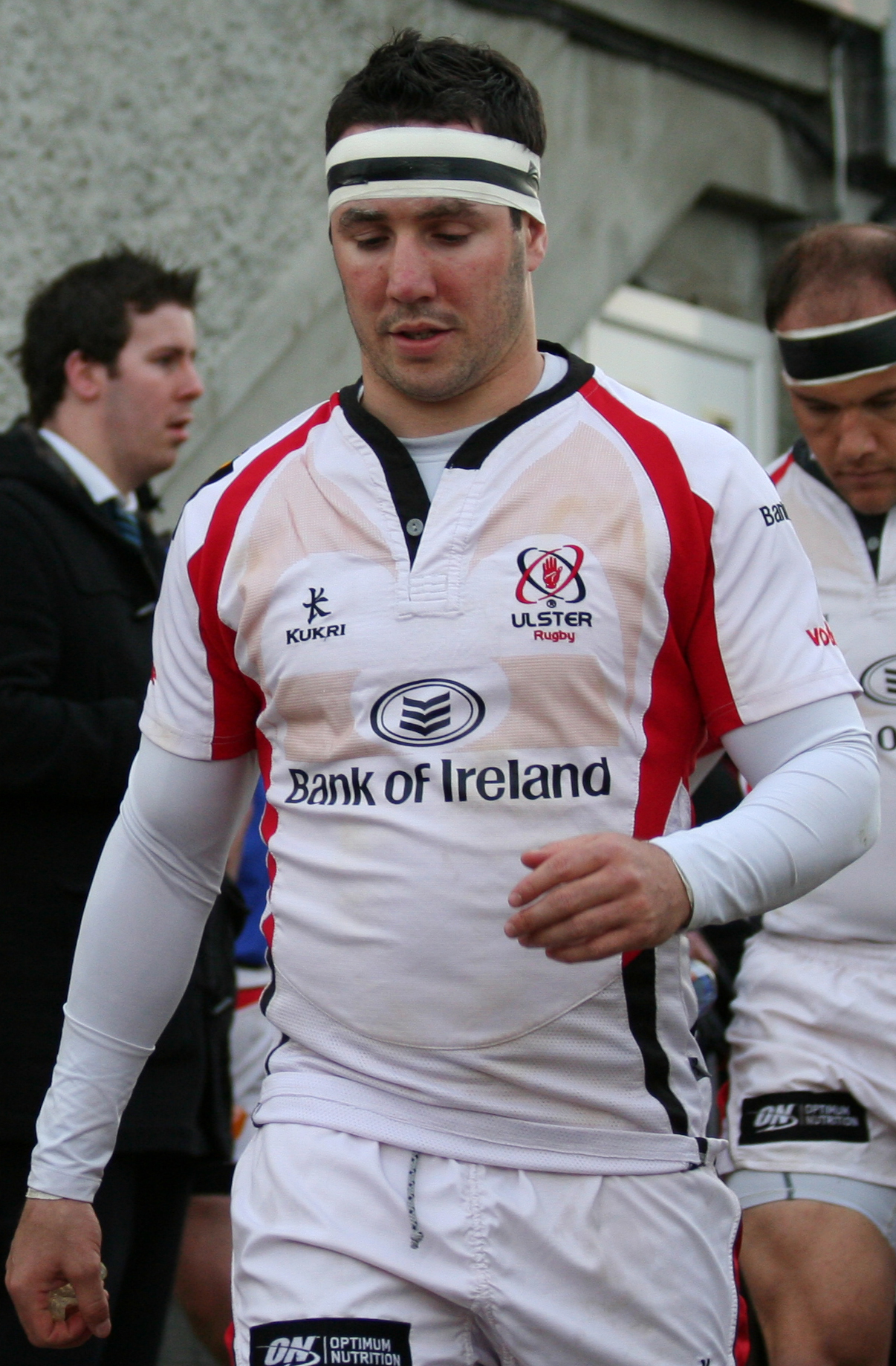
- Born: Patrick Wallace; 27 August 1979 (age 47) Dundonald, Northern Ireland
- Height: 1.8 m (5 ft 11 in)
- Weight: 81 kg (12 st 11 lb)
- School: Campbell College
- University: Trinity College Dublin

Rugby union career
- Position(s): Centre, Fly-half, Fullback
- Current team: Ulster
Amateur team(s)
Years	Team	Apps	(Points)
- UCD
Senior career
Years	Team	Apps	(Points)
2001–14	Ulster	189	(411)
- Correct as of 20 December 2013
International career
Years	Team	Apps	(Points)
1999	Ireland U19		
2001-10	Ireland A	14	(84)
2006-12	Ireland	30	(53)

Patrick Wallace (born 27 August 1979) is an Ireland rugby union player who played for Ireland's national team and played for Ulster. A native of Belfast, he attended Rockport School and Campbell College. He was a member of the Ireland U19 side (which also included Brian O'Driscoll) that lifted the U19 World Cup in 1998. He was a member of the Ireland Grand Slam winning team of 2009.

== 2001/02 season ==
Wallace burst on to the scene at the beginning of the 2001/02 season putting in a number of top class performances from fullback or out-half for Ulster. His wacky sidesteps and flamboyant goose-steps made him a favourite with the Ravenhill supporters. He soon became a regular and was selected to play for Ireland A against the touring New Zealand All Blacks at Ravenhill. Although Ireland lost 43–30 Wallace put in an extremely accomplished performance as well as kicking 20 points. He was a regular in both the Ulster and Ireland A teams for the remainder of the season, indeed helping the Ireland A team to a Shadow 6 Nations Triple Crown.

== 2002/03 season ==
Wallace began the 2002/03 season as Ulster's first choice fullback but a broken leg in a Celtic League game away to Swansea at St. Helens meant he would miss the majority of the remainder of the season. He would return in time though to help his club, Ballymena, win the AIB All Ireland League Title, defeating Clontarf in the final at Lansdowne Road.

== 2003/04 season ==
He began the 2003/04 season in the Number 10 shirt for Ulster due to David Humphreys absence because of the impending Rugby World Cup in Australia. After fellow Ulster player Jonny Bell was ruled out of the tournament with an achilles tendon injury the uncapped Wallace was called up to the Ireland Squad.

Although a great experience for the young Wallace he saw no game time. When he returned to Ulster, he had lost his place at fullback to the ever-consistent Bryn Cunningham, and the No10 slot to the returning David Humpreys. It seems in hindsight the best thing for Wallace would actually have been to stay with Ulster and play regular Celtic League rugby.

Having been left out of the squad for the opening Heineken Cup game away to the Newport Gwent Dragons he was drafted into the 22 for the visit of French giants Stade Français to Ravenhill after an injury to Australian international centre Ryan Constable. He would come on as a second-half replacement for Bryn Cunningham and score the winning try.

This secured the talented Wallace the Ulster Number 15 shirt for the next series of games including the 27–21 defeat of Edinburgh to lift the Celtic Cup, Ulster's first piece of silverware since the famous 1999 European Cup triumph, and the 33–0 thumping of Leicester Tigers at Ravenhill in January 2004, in the return leg of the Tigers' fixture though he had a torrid time playing at full-back and was relegated to the bench for the majority of the remainder of the season. Wallace had 3 more starts that season, twice at outside centre and once again at fullback, all due to injuries to other squad members. He was though successfully used as an impact substitute off the bench scoring a number of tries from here.

== 2004/05 season ==
The 2004/05 season started well for Wallace; playing from out-half he hit the winning drop goal in the 17–16 defeat of Edinburgh at Murrayfield but after this the Ulster team and he both suffered a massive dip in form. After the home defeat to Leinster in September 2004 he was relegated to the bench to accommodate David Humphreys at out-half. He made a number of appearances off the bench in this period but having come on for David Humphreys in the away Heineken Cup defeat to Gloucester he damaged knee ligaments that would see him ruled out until the new year.

With the Autumn Internationals directly after the Gloucester game and Humphreys involved with Ireland, Wallace would have had a chance to get a run of games for Ulster in the no. 10 shirt if it were not for this unfortunate injury. As it where he would make his return to the Ulster bench in the 9–8 away defeat to Leinster at Donnybrook, Dublin. Having then come on as a replacement in the 14–12 home win over Gloucester he started the following game, away to Cardiff Blues, at fullback. His next appearance in an Ulster shirt would be in the home glamour friendly against the touring South African team the Bulls.

Having come on at out-half for Adam Larkin he put in a decent showing reminding the Ulster management of what he was capable of. The Ireland A team had a one-off fixture with France A at Donnybrook, Dublin with Wallace, playing out-half and kicking 12 points in the 15–9 triumph, putting in an accomplished display. He subsequently regained the position of back-up out-half to David Humphreys and started in the 21–15 away defeat to Munster. Injury to Humphreys towards the end of the season gave Wallace two further starts in Celtic League games against Cardiff Blues and Llanelli Scarlets. He was selected by Ireland to tour Japan over the summer where he would have won his first full cap but his injury jinx struck again and a broken hand ruled him out.

== 2005/06 season ==
He began the 2005/06 season as Ulster's back up out-half and an injury to Bryn Cunningham meant Wallace played the opening 4 games of Ulster's Celtic League campaign from fullback putting in some solid performances including an important kicking display in the 22–19 away victory over the Dragons. Once Cunningham returned Wallace was once again relegated to the bench as cover for Humphreys.

Having sat on the bench for a number of games he finally got another start at home to the Ospreys whilst Humphreys was on Ireland duty. Wallace played poorly that night and his lack of game time was apparent. After discussions with Ulster coach Mark McCall it was decided it would be better for Wallace to go and play for his club, Ballymena, and get 80 minutes week in, week out.

His next appearance in an Ulster shirt that season was not even in the white of the senior team but the black shirts of the Ulster A team in the 24–19 defeat to Leinster A where Wallace played Inside Centre. He would continue to play for Ballymena before being once again drafted into the Ulster 22 for the Heineken Cup fixture away to Treviso where he came off the bench to score a try in the 43–26 bonus point win. After this cameo performance he would go on to sit on the bench for Ireland A in the 20–12 away defeat to France A, where he came on, and the 33–18 victory over England A at Kingsholm.

He would then once again return to his club for regular rugby as well as turning out for the Ulster A team in the 24–22 away defeat to Leinster A in Dundalk. When the club season ended though he was drafted back into the Ulster squad for the home game against the Borders. Having come on early for the injured Johnny Bell he put in a great performance at inside centre where he scored a well worked try. He retained his place in the starting line-up for the following week's trip to Stradey Park to face the Llanelli Scarlets and put in another solid performance in the no.12 shirt in the 12–12 draw. He would go on to keep his place in the team for the famous 19–17 victory over the Ospreys at the Liberty Stadium which took place the following week where Ulster clinched the Celtic League crown with a last minute drop goal from David Humphreys.

== Churchill Cup 2006 ==
Over the summer he played in the United States and Canada in the Barclays Churchill Cup with the Ireland A team playing at out-half in all three of Ireland's games, the wins over USA and England Saxons and the defeat to the New Zealand Māori. His performances were rewarded with very positive reviews and it seemed his confidence was finally returning.

== 2006/07 season ==
He began the 2006/07 season partnering Paul Steinmetz in the centre and as since kept his place even keeping Ireland star Andrew Trimble on the wing. The first two months of that season saw Wallace play the best rugby of his career and finally seem to fulfil some of the early promise which first shown back in 2001.

It therefore came as no surprise that Wallace was called up to the Ireland Autumn International Squad and won his first cap when coming on as a replacement in Ireland's record 32–15 victory over South Africa. He did not get on in Ireland's second game, a 21–6 victory over Australia, but did start and indeed star in the 61–17 thrashing of the Pacific Islanders, in what was the last ever international at Lansdowne Road. Wallace scored 26 points, including a try, 6 conversions and 3 penalties.

Following that display, Wallace secured himself a place in the 6 Nations squad and won one cap during the campaign, coming off the bench in the historic 43–13 defeat of England at Croke Park. Wallace continued to play for Ulster in the remaining Celtic League games however the Ulster team went through an end of season dip in form which saw them finish a disappointing 5th. Wallace did however, towards the end of the campaign, get some game time at out-half as opposed to in the centre.

== Argentina Tour 2007 ==
Wallace was named in the Ireland Squad for the 2007 tour to Argentina and played in the first test, a 22–20 defeat to a last minute Felipe Contepomi drop goal. Wallace had a good game however had to retire during the 2nd half after sustaining a knee injury. The loss of Wallace was undoubtedly crucial in Ireland losing the game. The knee injury kept him out of the 2nd test.

== Rugby World Cup 2007 ==
Wallace was named in Eddie O'Sullivan's 50-man training squad in preparation for the forthcoming World Cup to be held in France. Wallace made his fifth test appearance in Ireland's World Cup Warm-Up test against Scotland at Murrayfield.

Wallace started a match in which Ireland were beaten 31–21 by an impressive Scotland performance in what was a tight game with late try by Andy Henderson finally defeating Ireland. The next day Wallace was duly named in Ireland's squad for the World Cup. Outside of Irish legend Ronan O'Gara Wallace was the only recognised Out-Half in the Irish squad, something which drew much criticism upon coach Eddie O'Sullivan.

Wallace also came on as a substitute in the non-cap warm-up game with French Top 14 side Bayonne; a match that as subsequently been dubbed the "Battle of Bayonne" due to the extremely physical nature of the game which included Ireland captain Brian O'Driscoll leaving the field with a broken sinus. Wallace was named on the bench for the historic international at Ravenhill between Ireland and Italy however he was unused.

== 2007 to 2009 ==
The 2007/08 season turned out to be both extremely disappointing for both Ireland and Ulster. With Ulster, Wallace played the majority of the first half of the season in the number 10 shirt however with the arrival of new coach Matt Williams after Christmas, Wallace cemented his place in the team in the number 12 shirt with the young Niall O'Connor taking over at out-half. It was certainly a season to forget, with Ulster finishing bottom of their Heineken Cup group behind Gloucester, Bourgoin and the Ospreys. They also finished 9th in the Magners League.

Internationally, Ireland did not fare much better with a 4th-placed finish in the 6 Nations which would ultimately seal the fate of coach Eddie O'Sullivan. This was Ireland's lowest ever finish in the 6 Nations and was compounded by an embarrassing home loss to a rejuvenated Wales. Wallace gained brief substitute appearances against Scotland and England to gain his 7th and 8th international caps respectively.

Wallace was named in the Ireland squad for their summer tour games against the Barbarians, New Zealand and Australia. In the Barbarians game Wallace started at out-half and gave an accomplished display in Ireland's 39–14 win. Having previously been named on the bench for the test against New Zealand in Wellington the withdrawal of Leinster's Luke Fitzgerald gave Wallace a start in number 12 jersey. He did not disappoint scoring Ireland's only try in a brave 21–11 loss which heralded a return to what Ireland had always been capable of but had been repressed in the last 12 months of O'Sullivan's tenure. Wallace also played in the following weekend's encounter with the Wallabies with Ireland losing the game 18–12.

Following on from his fine form in the 2007/08 season, he began the 2008/09 season in equally good form for Ulster; playing most of his rugby once again as an Inside Centre. His club form was so good that, even with a fit-again Gordon D'Arcy, he was named as Ireland's starting number 12 for the 2009 Six Nations. Although he lost his starting berth for the final two matches of the campaign, he was a valuable member of the victorious Ireland team that won the 2009 Six Nations Championship and Grand Slam, their first Grand Slam in 61 years. There was massive relief for Wallace after Stephen Jones missed a late penalty awarded when Wallace clumsily strayed offside at a ruck. His shirt that he wore (12) was made up of tiny signatures of Irish fans the first being his son.

== 2011/12 season ==
Wallace was chosen for the 2011 Rugby World Cup and played two games but missed the 2012 Six Nations Championship through injury. He played 9 times for Ulster Rugby in the league scoring 3 tries.
