= Mark Crick (rugby union) =

United States international rugby union player

- Born: 27 January 1975 (age 51) Dubbo, New South Wales, Australia
- Height: 187 cm (6 ft 2 in)
- Weight: 105 kg (231 lb; 16 st 7 lb)

Rugby union career
- Position: Hooker
Senior career
Years	Team	Apps	(Points)
1999–2001	Waratahs	12	(0)
2001–2002	Ulster	3	(0)
- Correct as of 5 May 2021
International career
Years	Team	Apps	(Points)
2007–2008	United States	9	(0)
- Correct as of 5 May 2021

Mark Crick (born 27 January 1975 in Australia) was an Australian-born United States rugby union player. His playing position was hooker. He was selected as a reserve for the United States at the 2007 Rugby World Cup, but did not make an appearance. He though made 9 other appearances for the United States, while also represented the Waratahs in Super Rugby and Ulster in the Heineken Cup.
