= John Fogarty (rugby union, born 1927) =

- Born: John Raymond Patrick Fogarty c. 1928 Brisbane, Queensland
- Died: 9 July 2007
- School: St Joseph's, Nudgee

Rugby union career
- Position: wing
International career
Years	Team	Apps	(Points)
1949	Wallabies	2	(3)
- Rugby league career

Playing information
Representative
Years	Team	Pld	T	G	FG	P
1952	Queensland	1

John Raymond Patrick Fogarty (c. 18 October 1928 – 9 July 2007) was an Australian rugby union and rugby league footballer. He played two tests as a winger for the Wallabies in 1949.

Fogarty started playing rugby for St. Joseph's Nudgee College in Brisbane. He played for Brothers Old Boys in the Brisbane club rugby competition. in a golden era for the club. He represented Queensland as a winger.

Fogarty was a small player but was very fast and a good tackler.

In 1949, Fogarty was chosen in two tests against a New Zealand Maori side in Brisbane and Sydney. He was also a member of the Australian touring team to New Zealand led by Trevor Allan that won the Bledisloe Cup for the first time.

Fogarty's rugby league career included stints playing with Taree, Balmain, Brisbane Brothers and Herbert River. He also played one match for Queensland against New South Wales in 1952.

He died of lung cancer in 2007.
