= Seamus Mallon (rugby union) =

Irish rugby union player

Seamus Mallon (born 21 November 1980) is an Irish former professional rugby union player who played centre for Ulster and Northampton Saints.

He started playing rugby at Foyle College, then St. Columb's College in Derry. He won the Ulster league and cup double with City of Derry in 1999. He later played for Dungannon under Willie Anderson. He played for Ulster at under-21 level, and played for the senior Ulster team in friendlies against Leicester Tigers and Coventry in 2000. Ulster offered him a development contract, which he declined in favour of studying architecture at Queen's University Belfast. After graduating in 2003, he joined Ulster for the 2003–04 season.

After two seasons with Ulster, he moved to Northampton Saints in July 2005. After two seasons in the Premiership, he returned to Ulster in 2007. he was released at the end of the 2009–10 season.
