= Matt Mustchin =

NZ rugby union player

Matt Mustchin (born 2 February 1977) is a New Zealand-born former Scotland international rugby union player, who played flanker and lock for Canterbury Crusaders, Ulster and Edinburgh.

Born in Christchurch, he represented New Zealand at under-16, under-19 and under-21 level, and played for Canterbury Crusaders in Super 12. He signed for Ulster in 2003, and moved from the back row to the second row. He made 29 appearances in two seasons, including winning the 2004 Celtic Cup. He played club rugby for Belfast Harlequins, helping them to the 2005 All-Ireland League final. After his contract with Ulster was not renewed, he moved to Edinburgh in 2005 He qualified for Scotland on residence grounds, and made his international debut for his adopted country against Argentina in 2008. He won five caps for Scotland, but was ruled out of the 2009 Six Nations Championship with an ankle injury. He left Edinburgh at the end of the 2008-2009 season to play for of NTT Docomo Kansai in Japan.
