= Conor McPhillips =

Irish rugby union player

- Born: Conor McPhillips; 9 February 1981 (age 45) Dublin, Ireland
- Height: 1.75 m (5 ft 9 in)
- Weight: 85 kg (13.4 st)
- School: Templeogue College

Rugby union career
- Position: Wing / Scrum-half
- Current team: Bristol
Amateur team(s)
| Years | Team | Apps | (Points) |
| 2003–2009 | Galwegians | | |
| 2009–2010 | St Mary's College | | |
Senior career
| Years | Team | Apps | (Points) |
| 2003–2009 | Connacht | 120 | (160) |
International career
| Years | Team | Apps | (Points) |
| 1999–2002 | Ireland U21 | 4+ | |
| 2006 | Ireland A | 2 | |
National sevens team
| Years | Team | | Comps |
| 2001–2008 | Ireland 7s | | |
Coaching career
- Years: Team
- 2009–2010: St Mary's College (Player-coach)
- 2005–2016: Connacht (Analyst)
- 2016–2017: Connacht (Assistant)
- 2017–: Bristol Bears (Assistant)
- Correct as of 16 September 2018

Conor McPhillips (Irish name: Conchobhar MacPhilib; born 9 February 1981) is a former rugby union player from Ireland, who currently works as an assistant coach for English Premiership side Bristol Bears. McPhillips spent his professional playing career with Connacht, where he also served as a coach before joining Bristol in 2017.

== Playing career ==
=== Connacht ===
McPhillips played professional rugby for Connacht from 2003 to 2009, with the highlight being European Challenge Cup semi-finals against Harlequins and Sale Sharks. He scored 11 tries in his first season with Connacht, making him the top scorer in the Celtic League for the season. McPhillips scored a total of 20 tries in the Celtic League and 12 in the European Challenge Cup, which saw him leave as the team's top try scorer though his record was later overtaken by Fionn Carr. In August 2007, he played scrum half for Connacht in the defeat against South Africa in a World Cup preparation friendly match. South Africa went on to be crowned World Cup Champions.

=== International ===
McPhillips played for Ireland U21s in the 2002 Rugby World Cup in South Africa. He played Sevens rugby for Ireland in the 2001 Rugby World Cup Sevens in Argentina and 2008 Hannover Sevens. He was called up to the 2005 Ireland rugby union tour of Japan and he won 2 caps for the Irish 'A' side in the 2006 Churchill Cup against England and France.

== Coaching career ==
After the end of his professional career, McPhillips moved to All-Ireland League club St Mary's College in Dublin as a player-coach. He played scrum-half in the defeat to Cork Constitution in the 2010 All-Ireland League final and helped St Mary's College win the 2010 Leinster Senior League title. Following his success With St Mary's, McPhillips returned to his former club Connacht as head of video analysis under head coach Eric Elwood, his former teammate. He continued in this role under Elwood and his successor Pat Lam until the 2015–16 season when he became an assistant to attack coach Andre Bell, though he continued in his previous role of head analyst. With the departure of Bell the following year, McPhillips was promoted to attack coach for the 2016–17 season.

In 2017, McPhillips joined English second-tier club Bristol, where Pat Lam had taken over as head coach. In his first season with the team, they earned promotion to the Premiership.
