= David Hewitt (rugby union, born 1980) =

Irish rugby union player (born 1980)

- Born: 15 January 1980 (age 46) Dublin, Ireland
- Height: 1.80 m (5 ft 11 in)
- Weight: 78 kg (172 lb; 12.3 st)
- School: Belvedere College

Rugby union career
- Position(s): Fly-half, Full-back
Senior career
Years	Team	Apps	(Points)
2004–2005	Leinster	3	(0)
2005–2007	Racing 92	44	(95)
2003-2004	Connacht Rugby	18	(57)
National sevens team
Years	Team		Comps
2003-2005	Ireland 7s		8

David Hewitt (born 15 January 1980) is a retired Irish rugby union player. In his career playing at full-back & out-half he has represented Skerries, Clontarf, Lansdowne, Old Belvedere R.F.C. and professionally for Leinster, Connacht and Racing Métro 92 Paris.

Hewitt also represented Ireland at Colleges & Sevens levels, featuring in the Hong Kong Rugby World Cup Sevens in 2005.
