= Iain Fairley =

Scotland international rugby union player

- Born: Iain Thomas Fairley; 29 August 1973 (age 53) Kelso, Scotland
- Height: 5 ft 10 in (1.78 m)
- Weight: 14 st 0 lb (196 lb; 89 kg)

Rugby union career
- Position: Scrum-half
Senior career
Years	Team	Apps	(Points)
- Kelso RFC
2000–2002	Edinburgh Rugby		
International career
Years	Team	Apps	(Points)
1999–1999	Scotland	3	(3)
–	Scotland 7's		

Iain Fairley (born 29 August 1973) is a rugby union player who made three appearances for the Scotland national rugby union team.

== Early life ==
Fairley was born in Kelso, Scottish Borders.

== Rugby playing career ==
Fairley was selected for Scotland's 1998 Scotland rugby union tour of Oceania but early on he sustained an injury during training.

He made his debut against Italy in 1999 Five Nations Championship. His last appearance was against Spain in the 1999 Rugby World Cup.

In 2002 he was selected for the Scotland 7's team for tournaments in Singapore and Malaysia. He also joined the sevens team that competed at 2002 Commonwealth Games.

The same year he returned to the Borders to play domestic rugby, having been at Edinburgh Reivers.
