= Ronan McCormack =

Irish rugby union player

- Born: 27 April 1977 (age 49) Dublin, Ireland
- Height: 5 ft 10 in (1.78 m)
- Weight: 18 st 2 lb (115 kg)
- School: St. Mary's College, Dublin
- University: University College Dublin

Rugby union career
- Position: Prop
Amateur team(s)
Years	Team	Apps	(Points)
- UCD RFC
–	Buccaneers RFC		
Provincial / State sides
Years	Team	Apps	(Points)
2001–03	Connacht	26	
2003–05	Ulster	37	(10)
2005–10	Leinster	52	(15)

Ronan (Ronnie) McCormack (born 27 April 1977) is an Irish former professional rugby union player. who played loosehead prop for Connacht, Ulster and Leinster.

He attended St Mary's College, Dublin, with whom he won the Leinster Schools Junior Cup in 1992, and the Senior Cup in 1994. He represented Leinster Schools three times, and Ireland Schools four times. On leaving school, he tried out for the Ireland Foundation, a centrally-run pathway to the professional game, but failed to get a place. He played club rugby with University College Dublin in the All-Ireland League, and represented Ireland Universities twelve times.

In 2000 he signed professionally for Connacht. He made 26 appearances in two seasons, during which he was selected for Ireland 'A', winning nine caps. In 2003 he moved to Ulster, replacing Justin Fitzpatrick who had signed for Castres, which gave him the opportunity to play in the Heineken Cup. He played there for two seasons, making 37 appearances, and was called up to the Ireland squad for the 2005 Six Nations Championship. In 2005 he signed for his home province of Leinster, with whom he won the Heineken Cup and the Magners League.

His time at Leinster was marred by injury. In late 2006 he played for a combined Leinster/Ulster team against Connacht/Munster in "The Last Stand", an exhibition game at the old Lansdowne Road stadium before it was demolished, and sustained a neck injury. He sustained a more serious injury to his shoulder on his return to action for Leinster against Edinburgh in February 2007, which needed two operations and kept him out for a year. In the 2008-09 season he injured his neck in a warm-up. He retired in 2010, having made 52 appearances and scored three tries for the province.

He studied for a Masters in Sports Management, and moved into the residential property business. As of 2021, he was Managing Director of Grayling Property Management.
