= Brian O'Meara (rugby union) =

Irish rugby union player

- Born: Brian O'Meara; 5 April 1976 (age 50) Cork, Ireland
- Height: 1.75 m (5 ft 9 in)
- Weight: 91 kg (201 lb)
- School: Presentation Brothers College, Cork

Rugby union career
- Position: Scrum-half
Senior career
Years	Team	Apps	(Points)
1997–2000	Munster	20	(0)
2001–2006	Leinster	99	(553)
2006–2007	Munster	6	(0)
- Correct as of 15 April 2021
International career
Years	Team	Apps	(Points)
1996	Ireland U21		
1997–2003	Ireland	9	(0)
- Correct as of 15 April 2021

Brian O'Meara (born 5 April 1976, County Cork) is an Irish former rugby union player. After winning two senior cups with PBC, he joined Cork Con, playing in four AIL Finals, winning one. He won 99 caps for Leinster, after moving from Munster whom he played with from 1997 - 2000. He would return and make an additional six appearances for Munster in the 2006–07 season. He also won 9 caps for Ireland between 1997 and 2003, including two appearances at the 1999 Rugby World Cup. He is the 6th highest point scorer for Leinster rugby behind Ian Madigan, Johnny Sexton, Felipe Contepomi and Ross Byrne.
