= Alan Solomons =

- Born: 31 July 1950 (age 76) Uitenhage, South Africa
- School: Grey High School
- University: University of Cape Town

Rugby union career
Coaching career
- Years: Team
- 1997: Western Province (assistant)
- 1997–2000: South Africa (assistant)
- 1998: Stormers (assistant)
- 1998–1999: Western Province
- 1999–2001: Stormers
- 2001–2004: Ulster
- 2003: Barbarians
- 2004: Northampton Saints
- 2009–2012: Southern Kings
- 2009–2012: Eastern Province Kings
- 2010–2011: Barbarians (assistant)
- 2013: Southern Kings (Director of Rugby)
- 2013: Eastern Province Kings (Director of Rugby)
- 2013–2016: Edinburgh
- 2017–2022: Worcester Warriors (Director of Rugby)

Alan Solomons (born 31 July 1950) is a former rugby union coach.

== Law career ==
After studying law at the University of Cape Town, Solomons practised law for 20 years where he was a partner at Sonnenberg, Hoffmann & Galombik.

== Professional rugby coaching career ==
In 1997 Solomons left law to pursue a professional rugby coaching career as the assistant coach for Western Province (winners of Currie Cup), the Stormers & the Springboks.

In 1998 he was appointed head coach of Western Province (Currie Cup finalists) and in 1999 head coach of the Stormers (home semi finalists in 1999), a position he held until 2001. He remained as assistant Springbok coach working with the head coach, Nick Mallett until 2001 (Tri Nations winners 1998, world record 17 unbeaten Test run & 3rd placed at RWC 1999).

In 2001, he joined Irish rugby team Ulster, where he coached them for 3 seasons during which time they won the Celtic Cup (2004), were runners up in the Celtic League( 2004), lost only 1 home match in 3 seasons & moved from 37th ranking in Europe to 10th. In 2004 he was voted Northern Ireland Sports Manager of the year and Rugby Personality of the year.

After an unproductive short spell as head coach of Northampton, he joined the IRB as the High Performance consultant, a position he held until 2010. During this time, he was seconded for a year (2006) to USA Rugby as Director of Rugby.

He was also the Barbarians coach in 2003 when they defeated England, Scotland & Wales and assistant coach to Nick Mallett when the Springboks & All Blacks were defeated in 2010 & 2011.

In June 2009 he coached the Southern Kings in their debut match against The British & Irish Lions and in 2010 he was appointed Director of Rugby & head coach of both the Southern & EP Kings. He remained with the Kings until 2013 and led them to 2 Currie Cup Div1 titles (unbeaten in 2012) and as the SA Kings won the IRB Nations Cup in 2011. As Director of Rugby (Matt Sexton worked under him as head coach) he led the Kings in their debut Super Rugby season in 2013 (best ever debut season)

In 2013, he was appointed as the head coach of Edinburgh Rugby. In the 2014–2015 season, Edinburgh won the 1872 Cup derby against Glasgow Warriors for the 1st time in 6 years and became the first Scottish team to play in a European Rugby final.

On 28 September 2016, Solomons stepped down from is position at Edinburgh four weeks into the 2016–2017 season.

In February 2017, Solomons became a Coaching Consultant for Bristol Rugby.

In October 2017 Solomons became assistant coach at Worcester Warriors, and in December 2017 signed a 2.5-year contract as director of rugby. Following the 2021–22 season he will retire and is to be replaced by Steve Diamond.

== Coaching philosophy ==
Solomons approach has been described as "His philosophy on rugby is to get the simple things done well, work hard and everything else falls into place." Solomons normally focuses on the group rather than picking out individuals.
