= Tyrone Howe =

Irish rugby union player

- Born: Tyrone Gyle Howe; 2 April 1971 (age 55) Newtownards, Northern Ireland
- Height: 1.80 m (5 ft 11 in)
- Weight: 90 kg (14 st 2 lb; 198 lb)
- School: Banbridge Academy
- University: University of St Andrews

Rugby union career
- Position: Wing
Amateur team(s)
Years	Team	Apps	(Points)
- Banbridge
–	University of St Andrews		
–	Berliner Rugby Club		
–	Dungannon		(140)
Senior career
Years	Team	Apps	(Points)
1992-2006	Ulster	100	(140)
International career
Years	Team	Apps	(Points)
2000-2006	Ireland	14	(30)
2001	British & Irish Lions		

Tyrone Gyle Howe (born 2 April 1971, Newtownards, Northern Ireland) is a former rugby player who played on the wing for University of St Andrews RFC, Ulster, Ireland and the British & Irish Lions.

Howe was brought up in Dromore, attended Banbridge Academy, and graduated from the University of St Andrews. He joined Dungannon RFC in 1992 at the age of 21, and was first selected for Ulster eight weeks later, replacing the retiring Keith Crossan. He played for Oxford University in The Varsity Match against Cambridge in 1994 and 1995, captaining the team in 1995.

In 1996, Howe was diagnosed with Gilmore's Groin, an injury that resulted in a three-year absence from rugby. After initially being told he would be unable to play elite rugby again, he played for Newbury RFC when Ulster coach Harry Williams came to watch him play and subsequently offered him a contract to rejoin Ulster for the 1999-2000 season. He was named Player of the Year and Supporters Club Player of the Year in the 2001 Ulster Rugby Awards.

On 10 June 2000, he made his senior international debut for Ireland against the United States. It was Ireland's largest win, the final score finishing 83–3. He also toured with the 2001 British & Irish Lions. In total, Howe won 14 caps for Ireland. He retired from professional rugby at the end of the 2005-06 season, having made 100 appearances for Ulster, scoring ten tries in the Heineken Cup, seventeen in the Celtic League. and one in the Celtic Cup. He was part of the Dungannon side that won the All-Ireland League in 2001, scoring a try in the final, and scored 28 AIL tries for the club.

In 2005, he was elected to Banbridge District Council as an Ulster Unionist Party candidate. In 2007, he resigned from the council citing work commitments. Howe regularly appeared on Sky Sports rugby coverage as a commentator and analyst, having previously worked for Setanta Sports.

He taught at Uppingham School in Rutland for nine years and in September 2019 became headmaster of Shiplake College.
