= Paul Shields (rugby union) =

Rugby union player from Northern Ireland

- Born: Paul Michael Shields; 25 September 1978 (age 48) Belfast, Northern Ireland

Rugby union career
- Position: Hooker
Senior career
Years	Team	Apps	(Points)
- Ballymena RFC
? - 2007	Ulster Rugby	104	
2007-2009	Northampton Saints	41	(30)
International career
Years	Team	Apps	(Points)
2001-05	Ireland A	8	(10)
2003	Ireland	2	(0)

Paul Shields (born September 25, 1978) is an Irish professional rugby union footballer of the 2000s. He played at club level for Ulster Rugby and Northampton Saints, as a Hooker. He won two caps for the Ireland national team in 2003.

== Ulster Rugby ==
Paul Shields attained 104 caps for Ulster Rugby being the 9th member to join the 100 cap club. He has won the Celtic League and Celtic Cup. In his first year Paul was nominated as the Ulster player of the year

== Northampton Saints ==
Shields signed for the Northampton Saints in the 2007-08 season. Gaining praise over his pace as a hooker, he was placed on a rotational system with Dylan Hartley. In September 2009 Shields retired from professional rugby after suffering a neck injury in the March of that year.

== Personal life ==
His son Hugh Shields is also a professional rugby union player for Northampton Saints.
