= Dave Tiueti =

- Full name: Dave Tiueti
- Born: 6 June 1973 (age 53) Tonga
- Height: 181 cm (5 ft 11 in)
- Weight: 94 kg (14 st 11 lb; 207 lb)

Rugby union career
- Position: Winger
- Current team: Ospreys
Senior career
Years	Team	Apps	(Points)
1998–2003	Neath	17	(25)
2003–2005	Ospreys	38	(40)
2006–2007	Viadana	10	(5)
International career
Years	Team	Apps	(Points)
1997–2003	Tonga	21	(33)
- Correct as of 13 February 2017

Dave Tiueti (born 6 June 1973) is a former Tongan rugby union player who played for Ospreys regional team as a winger. He won 21 caps for Tonga, scoring 33 points.

Tiueti made his debut for the Ospreys regional team in 2003 having previously played for Neath RFC, Tonmawr RFC, Bristol Rugby and Rugby Viadana.

== Personal life ==
His son Dafydd-Rhys Tiueti is also a rugby union player.
