= Mark McHugh (rugby union) =

Irish rugby union player

Mark McHugh is an Irish rugby union former player who played at full-back and out-half. In his club career, he represented Leinster, Connacht, St Mary's College RFC, Galwegians RFC, Montpellier, Nice.

He played internationally for the Ireland national rugby union team, winning one cap in 2003 against Tonga. He also played for the Ireland national rugby sevens team, representing them in the World Rugby Sevens Series.
