= Paul Steinmetz =

- Born: 26 January 1977 (age 49) Paraparaumu, New Zealand
- Height: 1.76 m (5 ft 9 1/2 in)
- Weight: 85 kg (13 st 5 lb)
- School: Paraparaumu College

Rugby union career
- Position: Centre
Senior career
Years	Team	Apps	(Points)
2003-2009	Ulster	102	(115)
Provincial / State sides
Years	Team	Apps	(Points)
1997-2003	Wellington	68	(72)
Super Rugby
Years	Team	Apps	(Points)
2000-2001	Hurricanes	11	(15)
2002-2003	Highlanders	22	(40)
International career
Years	Team	Apps	(Points)
2002	New Zealand	1	(0)

Paul Christopher Steinmetz (born 26 January 1977 in Paraparaumu, New Zealand) is a retired professional rugby union footballer. He made one appearance for the All Blacks in 2002, becoming All Black #1030.

== Playing career ==
=== Provincial Rugby ===
Steinmetz made his debut for Wellington in 1997, but spent most of his first few seasons for the province as a reserve on a deep and talented squad. In 2000, he made 10 appearances including two starts in helping Wellington win the NPC championship.

In 2001, he finally solidified a starting position in the Wellington backs, which he held down through the remainder of his time with the province. His final match for Wellington before heading overseas was the 2003 NPC final.

=== Super Rugby ===
Steinmetz made his debut for the Hurricanes in the 2000 Super 12 season, but saw very limited action in his first season. In 2001 he made more of an impression, scoring 3 tries for the Hurricanes, but still found starts difficult to come by.

For the 2002, Steinmetz was drafted to the Highlanders and had the finest season of his career to that point. He started every game for the club and scored 5 tries as they advanced to the semi-finals of the competition.

He returned to the Highlanders for the 2003 season, and continued as a starter, scoring another three tries. However, it would be his last season in New Zealand as he signed for Ulster for the following campaign.

=== Europe ===
Steinmetz signed with Ulster in 2003 and went on to spend 6 seasons with the Irish province.

His appearances in his final two seasons were limited as he made the transition to player-coach and served as the team's backs coach in 2008–09. He scored his final first-class try in a Heineken Cup match against Stade Français on 24 January and retired as a player at the conclusion of the season.

=== International Rugby ===
A standout 2002 season saw Steinmetz earning All Black notice for the first time, and he was added to the squad for the end of year tour as an injury replacement after Carlos Spencer and Keith Lowen were ruled out. He was an unused substitute for the test against France and on 23 November came on as a substitute in the 77th minute of a victory against Wales.

It would be the only international appearance for Steinmetz, who fell back down the pecking order in 2003 and left New Zealand to play abroad after the 2003 Rugby World Cup.
