= Matt Sexton =

- Born: 21 April 1970 (age 56)
- Height: 1.82 m (5 ft 11 1/2 in)
- Weight: 106 kg (16 st 10 lb)
- School: Shirley Boys High School
- Notable relative: Jack Sexton (son)

Rugby union career
- Position: Hooker
Senior career
| Years | Team | Apps | (Points) |
| 2001–2004 | Ulster | | |
Provincial / State sides
| Years | Team | Apps | (Points) |
| 1991–2001 | Canterbury | 128 | |
Super Rugby
| Years | Team | Apps | (Points) |
| 1996–2001 | Crusaders | 36 | (5) |
International career
| Years | Team | Apps | (Points) |
- Junior All Blacks
Coaching career
- Years: Team
- Southern Kings: 2012–2013
- Eastern Province Kings: 2012–2013

Matt Sexton is a former New Zealand rugby union player and head coach of the Southern Kings Super Rugby franchise, as well as the Eastern Province Kings Currie Cup team. He is currently a talent identification coach for the New Zealand Rugby Union.

== Playing career ==
He made his debut for Canterbury in 1991, eventually making 128 appearances in his 10 years there. This included him leading Canterbury on their 1994 tour of the United Kingdom.

He was also a member of the Crusaders Super Rugby franchise in their first six seasons in the competition, although he missed the 2000 Super 12 season through injury. He was also the first forward to score a try in Crusaders colours, when he did so in the 1996 Super 12 season game against the Blues.

In 2001, he joined Irish province Ulster, where he played for three seasons under head coach Alan Solomons. He also played for the Barbarians under Solomons in 2003 and 2004.

== Coaching career ==
He then went into coaching, becoming the Academy manager at Canterbury (where he was the coach of the Crusaders Knights, the development squad of the Crusaders), the Tasman Rugby Union and was also on the coaching team for the New Zealand team in the 2009 IRB Junior World Championship.

In 2012, Sexton's former coach at Ulster, Alan Solomons (then the Director of Rugby at the South African Super Rugby franchise Southern Kings) renewed the relationship with Sexton when he appointed head coach of the Southern Kings, as well as the domestic Eastern Province Kings Currie Cup team effective from July 2012 in a deal until the end of 2014. However, on 30 July 2013, Solomons left the Kings to take up the role of Head Coach of Edinburgh Rugby. On 15 December, Sexton also announced that he was leaving the Kings so that he could return to his home country New Zealand, where he took up a role as a talent identification coach with the New Zealand Rugby Union.
