= Warren Brosnihan =

South African rugby union player

- Born: Warren Guy Brosnihan; 18 December 1971 (age 54) Paarl, Western Cape, South Africa
- Height: 1.91 m (6 ft 3 in)
- Weight: 105 kg (231 lb)
- School: Northlands Boys’ High School, Durban

Rugby union career
- Position: Flanker
Senior career
Years	Team	Apps	(Points)
2002–04	Ulster	24	(15)
2005–06	Calvisano	3	(0)
Provincial / State sides
Years	Team	Apps	(Points)
1994–95, 98–01	Natal/Sharks	51	(35)
1997	Golden Lions	24	(27)
2004–06	Blue Bulls	25	(25)
Super Rugby
Years	Team	Apps	(Points)
1998–01	Sharks	43	(15)
International career
Years	Team	Apps	(Points)
1997, 2000	South Africa	6	(5)

Warren Guy Brosnihan (born 28 December 1971) is a South African former rugby union player.

== Playing career ==
Brosnihan made his senior provincial debut in 1994 for Natal and in the 1997 season, he played for the Golden Lions, returning to the Sharks in 1998. In 2002 he moved to Northern Ireland to play for Ulster and returned to South Africa in 2004 to represent the Blue Bulls.

Brosnihan made his test debut for the Springboks against Australia during the 1997 Tri Nations Series at Loftus Versfeld in Pretoria, scoring his first and only test try. His second test match was three years later, during the 2000 Tri Nations Series, against New Zealand. He played a further four test matches in 2000, all as a replacement and he also played in four tour matches, scoring one further try for the Springboks.

=== Test history ===
No.	Opposition	Result (SA 1st)	Position	Tries	Date	Venue
1.	Australia	61–22	Flanker	1	23 Aug 1997	Loftus Versfeld, Pretoria
2.	New Zealand	12–25	Replacement		22 Jul 2000	Jade Stadium, Christchurch
3.	Australia	6–26	Replacement		29 Jul 2000	Stadium Australia, Sydney
4.	New Zealand	46–40	Replacement		19 Aug 2000	Ellis Park, Christchurch
5.	Australia	18–19	Replacement		26 Aug 2000	Kings Park, Durban
6.	England	17–25	Replacement		2 Dec 2000	Twickenham, London

== See also ==
- List of South Africa national rugby union players – Springbok no. 655
