= Ryan Constable =

Australia international rugby union player

- Born: 20 October 1971 (age 55) Durban, South Africa
- Height: 6 ft 1 in (185 cm)
- Weight: 210 lb (95 kg)

Rugby union career
- Position: Centre / Winger
Senior career
Years	Team	Apps	(Points)
1999-2000	Saracens		
2000-04	Ulster	48	(80)
International career
Years	Team	Apps	(Points)
1994	Australia	1	(0)

Ryan Constable (born 20 October 1971) is a South African-born Australian former professional rugby union player.

Constable, born in Durban, left South Africa aged 11 and attended Coolum High School on the Sunshine Coast.

A speedy three-quarter, Constable was part of the 1993 Wallabies tour, but injuries restricted him to a combined 18 minutes of play and he didn't feature in any of the Tests. His only international cap came the following year when he and GPS teammate Daniel Herbert debuted against Ireland at the Sydney Football Stadium. He came on off the bench to play on the wing. Unusually, he had yet to have represented Queensland at the time of his Wallabies debut.

In 2000, Constable set a Premiership Rugby record of six tries in a match for Saracens against Bedford.

Constable played for Ulster from 2000 to 2004, earning 48 caps. He remained in Northern Ireland after retiring from rugby and is based in Belfast, where he works as a sports agent.

== See also ==
- List of Australia national rugby union players
