= Adam Larkin =

Australian rugby union player

- Born: 14 February 1974 (age 52) Sydney, Australia
- Height: 1.85 m (6 ft 1 in)
- Weight: 87 kg (13 st 10 lb; 192 lb)

Rugby union career
- Position(s): Centre, fly-half, wing
Senior career
Years	Team	Apps	(Points)
1995–1997	North Harbour	26	(53)
1998–1999	Bristol	28	(90)
1999–2001	Castres Olympique		
2001–2007	Ulster	69	(233)
Coaching career
- Years: Team
- 2010–2016: Belfast Harlequins

Adam Larkin is an Australian former rugby union player and coach, who played for North Harbour, Bristol, Castres and Ulster. A utility back, his preferred position was inside centre, but he also played fly-half and wing.

Larkin was born in Sydney, Australia, and raised in New Zealand. Through a grandmother from Belfast, he held an Irish passport. He played for North Harbour for three seasons, alongside All-Black centres Walter Little and Frank Bunce, making 26 appearances and scoring 53 points, and represented New Zealand at under-21 level, but after failing to win a Super 12 contract with the Waikato Chiefs, he moved to England to join Bristol, making his debut in January 1998. He made 28 appearances for the club, scoring 17 tries and kicking one conversion, totalling 90 points, but was not offered a new contract after the 1998–99 season, and joined Castres Olympique. In 2001 he moved from Castres to Ulster. He was part of the team that won the Celtic Cup in 2004 and the 2005–06 Celtic League. He retired in December 2007, having made 69 appearances for the province and scored 233 points. He coached Belfast Harlequins for six seasons, from 2010 to 2016.
