= 2006–07 Ulster Rugby season =

- Ground: Ravenhill Stadium (Capacity: 12,500)
- Coach: Mark McCall
- Captain(s): Simon Best, Justin Harrison
- Top scorer: David Humphreys (200)
- Most tries: Andrew Trimble (9)
- League(s): Heineken Cup (3rd in pool); Celtic League (5th)
1st kit	2nd kit

The 2006–07 Ulster Rugby season was Ulster's 13th season since the advent of professionalism in rugby union, and their third under head coach Mark McCall. They competed in the Heineken Cup and the Celtic League.

They finished fifth in the Celtic League. Andrew Trimble was the league's joint top try scorer with seven. David Humphreys was fourth top points scorer with 148, and third leading marksman with 56 successful goal kicks. They were third in their Heineken Cup pool, failing to qualify for the knockout stage. Roger Wilson was Ulster's Player of the Year.

== Staff ==
Position	Name	Nationality
Director of Coaching	Mark McCall	Ireland
Assistant coach (forwards)	Allen Clarke	Ireland
Defence coach	Neil Kelly	England
Strength and conditioning coach	Rodney Kennedy	Ireland
Fitness and conditioning coach	Philip Morrow	Ireland
Team manager	John McComish	Ireland
Team doctor	David Irwin	Ireland
Team physiotherapist	Gareth Robinson	Ireland
Video analyst	Simon McGookin	Ireland

== Squad ==
=== Senior squad ===
==== Players in ====
- (Ireland) Tim Barker from (Scotland) Glasgow
- (Australia) Mark Bartholomeusz from (England) Saracens
- (Australia) Tom Court from (Australia) Queensland Reds
- (Ireland) Kieron Dawson from (England) London Irish
- (Australia) Sam Harding from (England) Northampton Saints (February 2007 to end of season)

==== Promoted from academy ====
- (Ireland) Niall Conlon
- (Ireland) Chris Henry
- (Ireland) Mark Kettyle
- (Ireland) Paul Marshall
- (Ireland) Paul McKenzie
- (Ireland) Stuart Philpott

==== Players out ====
- (Ireland) Jonny Bell retired
- (Ireland) Campbell Feather retired
- (New Zealand) Rowan Frost to (France) Mountauban
- (England) Henry Head to (England) Rotherham Titans
- (Ireland) Oisin Hennessy released
- (Ireland) Tyrone Howe retired
- (Australia) Rod Moore to (Italy) Calvisano
- (New Zealand) Reece Spee to (England) Pertemps Bees
- (New Zealand) Shane Stewart to (Wales) Newport Gwent Dragons
- (Ireland) James Topping retired

Ulster Rugby squad
**Props**: (Ireland) **Bryan Young** (23 apps, 20 starts); (Ireland) **Simon Best** (17 apps, 15 starts); (Ireland) **Justin Fitzpatrick** (22 apps, 14 starts, 5 pts); (Australia) Tom Court* (3 apps, 2 starts); (Ireland) Declan Fitzpatrick (8 apps, 1 start, 5 pts); (Ireland) John Andress (no apps); (Ireland) Niall Conlon (no apps); **Hookers**: (Ireland) **Rory Best** (19 apps, 18 starts, 20 pts); (Ireland) Paul Shields (16 apps, 8 starts); (Ireland) Nigel Brady (3 apps); (Ireland) Stuart Philpott (1 app); **Locks**: (Australia) Justin Harrison (25 apps, 25 starts); (Ireland) **Matt McCullough** (18 apps, 13 starts, 5 pts); (Ireland) Tim Barker (21 apps, 10 starts); (Ireland) Ryan Caldwell (6 apps, 4 starts); (Ireland) Lewis Stevenson (no apps)	**Back row**: (Ireland) **Roger Wilson** (26 apps, 25 starts, 15 apps); (Ireland) **Neil Best** (18 apps, 18 starts, 15 pts); (Ireland) Stephen Ferris (20 apps, 17 starts); (Ireland) **Kieron Dawson** (20 apps, 14 starts, 5 pts); (Ireland) Neil McMillan (14 apps, 4 starts, 10 pts); (Ireland) David Pollock (3 apps); (Australia) Sam Harding (1 app); (Ireland) Chris Henry (no apps); **Scrum-halves**: (Ireland) **Isaac Boss** (20 apps, 19 starts, 15 pts); (Ireland) **Kieran Campbell** (20 apps, 7 starts, 5 pts); (Ireland) Paul Marshall (2 apps); **Fly-halves**: (Ireland) **David Humphreys** (19 apps, 19 starts, 200 pts)	**Centres**: (Ireland) Paddy Wallace (24 apps, 22 starts, 47 pts); (New Zealand) **Paul Steinmetz** (23 apps, 22 starts, 62 pts); (Ireland) **Andrew Trimble** (19 apps, 19 starts, 45 pts); (Ireland) **Kevin Maggs** (20 apps, 7 starts); (Australia) Adam Larkin (3 apps, 1 start); (Ireland) Darren Cave (1 app); **Wings**: (Ireland) Paul McKenzie (12 apps, 16 starts); (Ireland) **Tommy Bowe** (17 apps, 15 starts, 25 pts); (Australia) **Mark Bartholomeusz** (15 apps, 14 starts, 5 pts); (Ireland) Andy Maxwell (14 apps, 12 starts, 20 pts); **Fullbacks**: (Ireland) Scott Young (23 apps, 20 starts); (Ireland) Bryn Cunningham (19 apps, 18 starts, 30 pts); (Ireland) Mark Kettyle (no apps)
(c) denotes the team captain, **Bold** denotes internationally capped players. Italics denotes academy players who appeared in the senior team.^{*} denotes players qualified to play for Ireland on residency or dual nationality.

=== Academy squad ===
==== Players in ====
- (Ireland) Niall O'Connor
- (Ireland) Neil Simpson
- (Ireland) Michael Ferguson
- (Ireland) Stephen Douglas
- (Ireland) Mark Robinson
- (Ireland) T. J. Anderson
- (Ireland) Willie Faloon
- (Ireland) David Drake
- (Ireland) Phil Coulter
- (Ireland) Owen McMurray
- (Ireland) Richard Fegan
- (Ireland) Dale Black

Position	Name	Nationality
High Performance Development Manager	Gary Longwell	Ireland
Fitness and conditioning coach	Steve Richards	Ireland
Elite Player Development Officer	Neil Doak	Ireland

Academy squad
**Props**: (Ireland) Michael Ferguson, Dungannon (1); (Ireland) Neil Simpson, Instonians (1); **Hookers**: (Ireland) Stephen Douglas, Ballymena (1); **Locks**: none	**Back row**: (Ireland) Mark Robinson, QUB (1); (Ireland) T. J. Anderson, Dungannon (1); (Ireland) David Pollock, QUB (2); (Ireland) Willie Faloon, Ballynahinch (1); **Scrum-halves**: (Ireland) David Drake, Ballymena (1); (Ireland) Phil Coulter, Malone (1); **Fly-halves**: (Ireland) Niall O'Connor, Belfast Harlequins (1); (Ireland) Owen McMurray, Instonians (1)	**Centres**: (Ireland) Darren Cave, Belfast Harlequins (2); (Ireland) Mark McCrea, QUB (1); (Ireland) Stuart Megaw, Ballynahinch; **Wings**: (Ireland) Richard Fegan, Malone (1); (Ireland) Dale Black, Dungannon (1); **Fullbacks**: none

== Season record ==
Competition	Played	Won	Drawn	Lost	PF	PA	PD	TF	TA
2006-07 Heineken Cup	6	2	0	4	111	129	-18	10	15
2006-07 Celtic League	20	11	1	8	423	310	113	45	31
Total	26	13	1	12	534	439	95	55	46

== Heineken Cup ==
=== Pool 5 ===
Team	P	W	D	L	Tries for	Tries against	Try diff	Points for	Points against	Points diff	TB	LB	Pts
(Wales) Llanelli Scarlets (2)	6	6	0	0	20	12	+8	169	120	+49	3	0	27
(France) Toulouse	6	3	0	3	18	17	+1	147	145	+2	3	2	17
(Ireland) Ulster	6	2	0	4	10	15	−5	111	129	−18	1	1	10
(England) London Irish	6	1	0	5	15	19	−4	124	157	−33	2	3	9

21 October 2006	Ulster (Ireland)	30–3	(France) Toulouse	Ravenhill, Belfast
13:35	Try: Trimble (2) 3' c, 39' c Boss 29' c Con: Humphreys (3); Pen: Humphreys (3) 6', 11', 40+3'; Cards: J. Fitzpatrick (yellow card) 66'	Report	Pen: Courrent 14'; Cards: Jauzion (yellow card) 40+2'; Pelous (yellow card) 53'	Attendance: 12,772; Referee: Dave Pearson (England)
Ulster lineup: 1. Justin Fitzpatrick, 2. Rory Best, 3. Bryan Young, 4. Justin Harrison, 5. Matt McCullough, 6. Neil Best, 7. Stephen Ferris, 8. Roger Wilson, 9. Isaac Boss, 10. David Humphreys, 11. Andrew Trimble, 12. Paddy Wallace, 13. Paul Steinmetz, 14. Tommy Bowe, 15. Bryn Cunningham.; Replacements: 16. Paul Shields, 17. Simon Best (for Fitzpatrick), 18. Tim Barker (for Harrison), 19. Kieron Dawson (for Ferris), 20. Kieran Campbell (for Boss), 21. Kevin Maggs (for Steinmetz), 22. Andy Maxwell (for Bowe).				Attendance: 12,772; Referee: Dave Pearson (England)

27 October 2006	Llanelli Scarlets (Wales)	21–15	(Ireland) Ulster	Stradey Park, Llanelli
19:30	Try: King 4' m M. Jones 50' c Con: S. Jones; Pen: S. Jones (3) 28', 40+6', 71'; Cards: Dunlea (yellow card) 78'	Report	Pen: Humphreys (5) 33', 38', 47', 58', 64'	Attendance: 8,914; Referee: Tony Spreadbury (England)
Ulster lineup: 1. Justin Fitzpatrick, 2. Rory Best, 3. Bryan Young, 4. Justin Harrison, 5. Matt McCullough, 6. Neil Best, 7. Stephen Ferris, 8. Roger Wilson, 9. Isaac Boss, 10. David Humphreys, 11. Andrew Trimble, 12. Paddy Wallace, 13. Paul Steinmetz, 14. Andy Maxwell, 15. Bryn Cunningham.; Replacements: 16. Paul Shields, 17. Simon Best (for Fitzpatrick), 18. Tim Barker, 19. Kieron Dawson (for Ferris), 20. Kieran Campbell, 21. Kevin Maggs (for Wallace), 22. Scott Young (for Cunningham).				Attendance: 8,914; Referee: Tony Spreadbury (England)

9 December 2006	London Irish (England)	29–13	(Ireland) Ulster	Madejski Stadium, Reading
15:30	Try: Leguizamón 17' c Catt 20' c Geraghty 62' c Tagicakibau 80+5' m Con: Geraghty (3); Pen: Everitt 80'; Cards: Armitage (yellow card) 40'; Bishop (yellow card) 40+2'	Report	Try: Steinmetz 40+3' c Con: Humphreys; Pen: Humphreys (2) 13', 33'	Attendance: 14,675; Referee: Joël Jutge (France)
Ulster lineup: 1. Bryan Young, 2. Rory Best, 3. Simon Best, 4. Justin Harrison, 5. Matt McCullough, 6. Neil Best, 7. Kieron Dawson, 8. Roger Wilson, 9. Isaac Boss, 10. David Humphreys, 11. Andrew Trimble, 12. Paddy Wallace, 13. Paul Steinmetz, 14. Tommy Bowe, 15. Bryn Cunningham.; Replacements: 16. Paul Shields, 17. Justin Fitzpatrick (for B. Young), 18. Tim Barker, 19. Neil McMillan (for Dawson), 20. Kieran Campbell, 21. Kevin Maggs, 22. Mark Bartholomeusz (for Cunningham).				Attendance: 14,675; Referee: Joël Jutge (France)

15 December 2006	Ulster (Ireland)	29–13	(England) London Irish	Ravenhill, Belfast
19:30	Try: Trimble 18' m Humphreys 44' c McMillan 58' c Steinmetz 76' c Con: Humphreys (3); Pen: Humphreys 51'; Cards: Boss (yellow card) 25'; Trimble (yellow card) 80+1'	Report	Try: Tiesi 62' c Con: Geraghty; Pen: Geraghty (2) 15', 31'; Cards: Casey (yellow card) 73'; Armitage (yellow card) 80+1'	Attendance: 12,747; Referee: Nigel Whitehouse (Wales)
Ulster lineup: 1. Justin Fitzpatrick, 2. Rory Best, 3. Simon Best, 4. Justin Harrison, 5. Matt McCullough, 6. Neil Best, 7. Kieron Dawson, 8. Roger Wilson, 9. Isaac Boss, 10. David Humphreys, 11. Andrew Trimble, 12. Paddy Wallace, 13. Paul Steinmetz, 14. Mark Bartholomeusz, 15. Bryn Cunningham.; Replacements: 16. Paul Shields (for R. Best), 17. Bryan Young (for Fitzpatrick), 18. Tim Barker (for Mcullough), 19. Neil McMillan (for Dawson), 20. Kieran Campbell (for Boss), 21. Adam Larkin (for Wallace), 22. Scott Young (for Bartholomeusz).				Attendance: 12,747; Referee: Nigel Whitehouse (Wales)

13 January 2007	Ulster (Ireland)	11–35	(Wales) Llanelli Scarlets	Ravenhill, Belfast
13:35	Try: Bowe 13' m Pen: Wallace 1'; Steinmetz 38'	Report	Try: Popham 35' c King 57' c Stoddart 63' c Peel 79' c G. Thomas 80+1' c Con: S. Jones (5); Cards: Popham (yellow card) 22'	Attendance: 12,278; Referee: Joël Jutge (France)
Ulster lineup: 1. Bryan Young, 2. Rory Best, 3. Simon Best, 4. Justin Harrison, 5. Matt McCullough, 6. Neil Best, 7. Kieron Dawson, 8. Roger Wilson, 9. Kieran Campbell, 10. Paddy Wallace, 11. Paul McKenzie, 12. Paul Steinmetz, 13. Andrew Trimble, 14. Tommy Bowe, 15. Mark Bartholomeusz.; Replacements: 16. Paul Shields (for R. Best), 17. Justin Fitzpatrick (for B. Young), 18. Tim Barker (for Harrison), 19. Ryan Caldwell (for McCullough), 20. Paul Marshall, 21. Adam Larkin (for Wallace), 22. Kevin Maggs (for Steinmetz).				Attendance: 12,278; Referee: Joël Jutge (France)

21 January 2007	Toulouse (France)	28–13	(Ireland) Ulster	Stade Ernest-Wallon, Toulouse
14:00	Try: Poitrenaud (2) 6' c, 65' c Nyanga 73' m Con: Courrent (2); Pen: Courrent (3) 25', 53', 71'; Cards: Brennan (yellow card) 50'	Report	Try: McCullough 12' c Con: Wallace; Pen: Wallace (2) 43', 57'; Cards: Harrison (yellow card) 50'	Attendance: 14,765; Referee: Tony Spreadbury (England)
Ulster lineup: 1. Bryan Young, 2. Rory Best, 3. Simon Best, 4. Justin Harrison, 5. Matt McCullough, 6. Neil Best, 7. Kieron Dawson, 8. Roger Wilson, 9. Kieran Campbell, 10. Paddy Wallace, 11. Paul McKenzie, 12. Paul Steinmetz, 13. Andrew Trimble, 14. Tommy Bowe, 15. Mark Bartholomeusz.; Replacements: 16. Paul Shields (for R. Best), 17. Justin Fitzpatrick (for B. Young), 18. Tim Barker (for Mcullough), 19. Stephen Ferris (for Wilson), 20. Paul Marshall, 21. Adam Larkin, 22. Kevin Maggs (for McKenzie).				Attendance: 14,765; Referee: Tony Spreadbury (England)

== Celtic League ==
	Team	Pld	W	D	L	PF	PA	PD	TF	TA	Try bonus	Losing bonus	Pts
1	(Wales) Ospreys	20	14	0	6	461	374	+87	49	32	4	4	64
2	(Wales) Cardiff Blues	20	13	1	6	447	327	+120	53	33	6	3	63
3	(Ireland) Leinster	20	12	1	7	472	376	+96	54	37	7	4	61
4	(Wales) Llanelli Scarlets	20	12	0	8	490	417	+73	61	41	9	0	57
5	(Ireland) Ulster	20	11	1	8	423	310	+113	45	31	4	5	55
6	(Ireland) Munster	20	12	0	8	379	294	+85	37	31	3	3	54
7	(Scotland) Glasgow Warriors	20	11	0	9	434	419	+15	42	49	3	2	49
8	(Scotland) Edinburgh	20	8	1	11	335	423	−88	31	45	2	6	42
9	(Wales) Newport Gwent Dragons	20	8	0	12	353	362	−9	36	43	1	6	39
10	(Ireland) Connacht	20	4	2	14	326	474	−148	30	48	2	4	26
11	(Scotland) Border Reivers	20	2	0	18	201	545	−344	16	64	0	4	12
Under the standard bonus point system, points are awarded as follows: 4 points for a win; 2 points for a draw; 1 bonus point for scoring 4 tries (or more) (Try bonus); 1 bonus point for losing by 7 points (or fewer) (Losing bonus)
Source: RaboDirect PRO12

2 September 2006	Ulster (Ireland)	31 – 16	(Wales) Llanelli Scarlets	Ravenhill, Belfast
19:30	Try: Humphreys; Steinmetz; Bartholomeusz; Con: Humphreys (2); Pen: Humphreys (4)	Report	Try: Daniel; Con: Jones; Pen: Jones (3)	Attendance: 8,265
Ulster lineup: 1. Justin Fitzpatrick, 2. Paul Shields, 3. Tom Court, 4. Justin Harrison, 5. Tim Barker, 6. Stephen Ferris, 7. Neil McMillan, 8. Roger Wilson, 9. Kieran Campbell, 10. David Humphreys, 11. Andy Maxwell, 12. Paddy Wallace, 13. Paul Steinmetz, 14. Mark Bartholomeusz, 15. Bryn Cunningham.; Replacements: 16. Nigel Brady (for Shields), 17. Declan Fitzpatrick (for Court), 18. Matt McCullough (for Barker), 19. Kieron Dawson (for McMillan), 20. Paul Marshall, 21. Kevin Maggs (for Wallace), 22. Scott Young (for Cunningham).				Attendance: 8,265

9 September 2006	Newport Gwent Dragons (Wales)	25 – 32	(Ireland) Ulster	Rodney Parade, Newport
17:30	Try: Brew (2); Fitisemanu; Con: Sweeney (2); Pen: Sweeney (2)	Report	Try: Cunningham (2); Maxwell; Fitzpatrick; Con: Humphreys (3); Pen: Humphreys (2)	Attendance: 5,114
Ulster lineup: 1. Justin Fitzpatrick, 2. Paul Shields, 3. Tom Court, 4. Justin Harrison, 5. Tim Barker, 6. Stephen Ferris, 7. Neil McMillan, 8. Roger Wilson, 9. Kieran Campbell, 10. David Humphreys, 11. Andy Maxwell, 12. Paddy Wallace, 13. Paul Steinmetz, 14. Mark Bartholomeusz, 15. Bryn Cunningham.; Replacements: 16. Nigel Brady (for Shields), 17. Declan Fitzpatrick (for Court), 18. Matt McCullough (for Harrison), 19. Kieron Dawson (for McMillan), 20. Paul Marshall (for Campbell), 21. Kevin Maggs (for Wallace), 22. Scott Young.				Attendance: 5,114

15 September 2006	Edinburgh (Scotland)	20 – 15	(Ireland) Ulster	Murrayfield, Edinburgh
19:30	Try: Cairns; Pen: Paterson (4); Drop: Godman	Report	Pen: Humphreys (5)	Attendance: 3,129
Ulster lineup: 1. Justin Fitzpatrick, 2. Rory Best, 3. Bryan Young, 4. Tim Barker, 5. Matt McCullough, 6. Stephen Ferris, 7. Kieron Dawson, 8. Roger Wilson, 9. Isaac Boss, 10. David Humphreys, 11. Andy Maxwell, 12. Paddy Wallace, 13. Paul Steinmetz, 14. Mark Bartholomeusz, 15. Bryn Cunningham.; Replacements: 16. Paul Shields, 17. Tom Court (for B. Young), 18. Lewis Stevenson, 19. Neil McMillan (for Dawson), 20. Kieran Campbell (for Boss), 21. Kevin Maggs (for Wallace), 22. Scott Young.				Attendance: 3,129

22 September 2006	Ulster (Ireland)	43 – 7	(Wales) Ospreys	Ravenhill, Belfast
19:30	Try: R. Best; Bowe; Steinmetz; McMillan; Con: Humphreys (4); Pen: Humphreys (5)	Report	Try: Byrne; Con: Hook; Cards: Jones (yellow card)	Attendance: 10,804
Ulster lineup: 1. Justin Fitzpatrick, 2. Rory Best, 3. Bryan Young, 4. Justin Harrison, 5. Tim Barker, 6. Stephen Ferris, 7. Kieron Dawson, 8. Roger Wilson, 9. Isaac Boss, 10. David Humphreys, 11. Andy Maxwell, 12. Paddy Wallace, 13. Paul Steinmetz, 14. Mark Bartholomeusz, 15. Bryn Cunningham.; Replacements: 16. Paul Shields (for R. Best), 17. Declan Fitzpatrick (for J. Fitzpatrick), 18. Matt McCullough (for Barker), 19. Neil McMillan (for Ferris), 20. Kieran Campbell (for Boss), 21. Kevin Maggs (for Wallace), 22. Tommy Bowe (for Maxwell).				Attendance: 10,804

30 September 2006	Munster (Ireland)	21 – 13	(Ireland) Ulster	Musgrave Park, Cork
19:30	Try: Wallace; Horgan; Con: O'Gara; Pen: O'Gara (3)	Report	Try: Steinmetz; Con: Humphreys; Pen: Humphreys (2); Cards: Harrison (yellow card)	Attendance: 8,000
Ulster lineup: 1. Justin Fitzpatrick, 2. Rory Best, 3. Bryan Young, 4. Justin Harrison, 5. Matt McCullough, 6. Neil Best, 7. Neil McMillan, 8. Roger Wilson, 9. Isaac Boss, 10. David Humphreys, 11. Andrew Trimble, 12. Paddy Wallace, 13. Paul Steinmetz, 14. Tommy Bowe, 15. Bryn Cunningham.; Replacements: 16. Paul Shields (for R. Best), 17. Declan Fitzpatrick (for J. Fitzpatrick), 18. Tim Barker (for McCullough), 19. Kieron Dawson (for N. Best), 20. Stephen Ferris (for McMillan), 21. Kevin Maggs (for Steinmetz), 22. Kieran Campbell (for Bowe).				Attendance: 8,000

6 October 2006	Connacht (Ireland)	17 – 24	(Ireland) Ulster	The Sportsground, Galway
18:30	Try: Mostyn; Warwick; Con: Warwick (2); Pen: Warwick; Cards: McHugh (yellow card); Rigney (yellow card)	Report	Try: Cunningham; Wilson; Boss; Con: Humphreys (2); Pen: Humphreys	Attendance: 1,687
Ulster lineup: 1. Justin Fitzpatrick, 2. Rory Best, 3. Bryan Young, 4. Justin Harrison, 5. Matt McCullough, 6. Neil Best, 7. Stephen Ferris, 8. Roger Wilson, 9. Isaac Boss, 10. David Humphreys, 11. Andrew Trimble, 12. Paddy Wallace, 13. Kevin Maggs, 14. Andy Maxwell, 15. Bryn Cunningham.; Replacements: 16. Paul Shields (for R. Best), 17. Declan Fitzpatrick (for B. Young), 18. Tim Barker (for Harrison), 19. Kieron Dawson (for N. Best), 20. Neil McMillan (for Ferris), 21. Kieran Campbell (for Boss), 22. Scott Young (for Humphreys).				Attendance: 1,687

14 October 2006	Ulster (Ireland)	32 – 12	(Wales) Cardiff Blues	Ravenhill, Belfast
17:30	Try: Cunningham; Wallace; N. Best; Trimble (2); Con: Humphreys (2); Pen: Humphreys	Report	Try: Czekaj; Evans; Con: Macleod; Cards: Yapp (yellow card); Morgan (yellow card)	Attendance: 9,979
Ulster lineup: 1. Justin Fitzpatrick, 2. Rory Best, 3. Bryan Young, 4. Justin Harrison, 5. Matt McCullough, 6. Neil Best, 7. Stephen Ferris, 8. Roger Wilson, 9. Isaac Boss, 10. David Humphreys, 11. Andrew Trimble, 12. Paddy Wallace, 13. Kevin Maggs, 14. Andy Maxwell, 15. Bryn Cunningham.; Replacements: 16. Paul Shields (for R. Best), 17. Declan Fitzpatrick (for J. Fitzpatrick), 18. Tim Barker (for Harrison), 19. Neil McMillan (for Ferris), 20. Kieran Campbell (for Boss), 21. Adam Larkin (for Humphreys), 22. Scott Young (for Trimble).				Attendance: 9,979

3 November 2006	Ulster (Ireland)	32 – 8	(Scotland) Border Reivers	Ravenhill, Belfast
19:30	Try: Dawson; J. Fitzpatrick; Campbell; Steinmetz; Con: Humphreys (3); Pen: Humphreys (2)	Report	Try: Danielli; Con: MacRae; Cards: MacDougall (yellow card); Scott (yellow card)	Attendance: 10,452
Ulster lineup: 1. Justin Fitzpatrick, 2. Paul Shields, 3. Simon Best, 4. Justin Harrison, 5. Tim Barker, 6. Stephen Ferris, 7. Kieron Dawson, 8. Roger Wilson, 9. Kieran Campbell, 10. David Humphreys, 11. Andy Maxwell, 12. Paul Steinmetz, 13. Kevin Maggs, 14. Scott Young, 15. Mark Bartholomeusz.; Replacements: 16. Nigel Brady (for Shields), 17. Declan Fitzpatrick, 18. Matt McCullough (for Barker), 19. Neil McMillan (for Ferris), 20. Paul Marshall (for Campbell), 21. Adam Larkin, 22. Paul McKenzie (for Maxwell).				Attendance: 10,452

2 December 2006	Ulster (Ireland)	6 – 6	(Ireland) Leinster	Ravenhill, Belfast
19:30	Pen: Humphreys (2); Cards: Harrison (yellow card); McCullough (yellow card)	Report	Pen: D'Arcy; Drop: D'Arcy; Cards: Pala'amo (yellow card)	Attendance: 12,800
Ulster lineup: 1. Bryan Young, 2. Rory Best, 3. Simon Best, 4. Justin Harrison, 5. Matt McCullough, 6. Neil Best, 7. Kieron Dawson, 8. Roger Wilson, 9. Isaac Boss, 10. David Humphreys, 11. Paul McKenzie, 12. Paddy Wallace, 13. Paul Steinmetz, 14. Mark Bartholomeusz, 15. Bryn Cunningham.; Replacements: 16. Paul Shields, 17. Justin Fitzpatrick, 18. Tim Barker, 19. Stephen Ferris (for Dawson), 20. Kieran Campbell, 21. Kevin Maggs (for Wallace), 22. Scott Young.				Attendance: 12,800

26 December 2006	Ulster (Ireland)	20 – 10	(Ireland) Connacht	Ravenhill, Belfast
17:30	Try: Bowe (2); N. Best; Con: Wallace; Pen: Humphreys	Report	Try: Fogarty; Con: McHugh; Pen: Warwick	Attendance: 12,143
Ulster lineup: 1. Justin Fitzpatrick, 2. Paul Shields, 3. Simon Best, 4. Justin Harrison, 5. Tim Barker, 6. Neil Best, 7. Neil McMillan, 8. Roger Wilson, 9. Kieran Campbell, 10. David Humphreys, 11. Andrew Trimble, 12. Paul Steinmetz, 13. Kevin Maggs, 14. Mark Bartholomeusz, 15. Bryn Cunningham.; Replacements: 16. Rory Best (for Shields), 17. Bryan Young (for J. Fitzpatrick), 18. Matt McCullough (for Barker), 19. Kieron Dawson (for McMillan), 20. Isaac Boss (for Campbell), 21. Paddy Wallace (for Humphreys), 22. Tommy Bowe (for Cunningham).				Attendance: 12,143

31 December 2006	Leinster (Ireland)	20 – 12	(Ireland) Ulster	Lansdowne Road, Dublin
14:00	Try: Hickie; Finegan; Heaslip; Con: Contepomi; Pen: Sexton; Cards: Hickie (yellow card)	Report	Pen: Wallace (3); Drop: Wallace	Attendance: 48,000
Ulster lineup: 1. Bryan Young, 2. Rory Best, 3. Simon Best, 4. Justin Harrison, 5. Matt McCullough, 6. Neil Best, 7. Kieron Dawson, 8. Roger Wilson, 9. Isaac Boss, 10. David Humphreys, 11. Andrew Trimble, 12. Paul Steinmetz, 13. Kevin Maggs, 14. Tommy Bowe, 15. Mark Bartholomeusz.; Replacements: 16. Paul Shields (for R. Best), 17. Justin Fitzpatrick (for B. Young), 18. Tim Barker (for Harrison), 19. Neil McMillan (for Dawson), 20. Kieran Campbell (for Boss), 21. Paddy Wallace (for Humphreys), 22. Paul McKenzie (for Maggs).				Attendance: 48,000

6 January 2007	Glasgow Warriors (Scotland)	8 – 19	(Ireland) Ulster	Hughenden, Glasgow
17:30	Try: Newman; Pen: Parks	Report	Try: R. Best; Bowe; N. Best; Con: Wallace (2)	Attendance: 2,799
Ulster lineup: 1. Bryan Young, 2. Rory Best, 3. Simon Best, 4. Justin Harrison, 5. Matt McCullough, 6. Neil Best, 7. Kieron Dawson, 8. Roger Wilson, 9. Isaac Boss, 10. Paddy Wallace, 11. Paul McKenzie, 12. Andrew Trimble, 13. Kevin Maggs, 14. Tommy Bowe, 15. Mark Bartholomeusz.; Replacements: 16. Paul Shields (for R. Best), 17. Justin Fitzpatrick (for B. Young), 18. Tim Barker (for McCullough), 19. Neil McMillan (for Dawson), 20. Kieran Campbell (for Boss), 21. Adam Larkin, 22. Paul Steinmetz (for Maggs).				Attendance: 2,799

27 January 2007	Ospreys (Wales)	29 – 22	(Ireland) Ulster	Liberty Stadium, Swansea
17:30	Try: Walker (2); Con: Connor (2); Pen: Connor (3); Drop: Connor (2)	Report	Try: Ferris; Con: Steinmetz; Pen: Steinmetz (5)	Attendance: 6,077
Ulster lineup: 1. Bryan Young, 2. Paul Shields, 3. Justin Fitzpatrick, 4. Justin Harrison, 5. Tim Barker, 6. Stephen Ferris, 7. Kieron Dawson, 8. Roger Wilson, 9. Kieran Campbell, 10. Adam Larkin, 11. Paul McKenzie, 12. Paul Steinmetz, 13. Kevin Maggs, 14. Tommy Bowe, 15. Mark Bartholomeusz.; Replacements: 16. Stuart Philpott, 17. Declan Fitzpatrick, 18. Ryan Caldwell, 19. David Pollock (for Ferris), 20. Paul Marshall, 21. Scott Young (for McKenzie), 22. Bryn Cunningham (for Larkin).				Attendance: 6,077

16 February 2007	Ulster (Ireland)	14 – 7	(Wales) Newport Gwent Dragons	Ravenhill, Belfast
19:10	Try: Trimble; Boss; Con: Humphreys (2)	Report	Try: Brew; Con: Sweeney	Attendance: 9,237
Ulster lineup: 1. Justin Fitzpatrick, 2. Paul Shields, 3. Simon Best, 4. Justin Harrison, 5. Tim Barker, 6. Neil Best, 7. Kieron Dawson, 8. Stephen Ferris, 9. Isaac Boss, 10. David Humphreys, 11. Andrew Trimble, 12. Paddy Wallace, 13. Paul Steinmetz, 14. Tommy Bowe, 15. Bryn Cunningham.; Replacements: 16. Stuart Philpott, 17. Bryan Young (for S. Best), 18. Ryan Caldwell, 19. Roger Wilson (for Dawson), 20. Kieran Campbell (for Boss), 21. Kevin Maggs (for Wallace), 22. Paul McKenzie (for Cunningham).				Attendance: 9,237

3 March 2007	Llanelli Scarlets (Wales)	17 – 11	(Ireland) Ulster	Stradey Park, Llanelli
17:30	Try: Davies; Pen: Thomas (4)	Report	Try: Trimble; Pen: Humphreys (2)	Attendance: 5,641
Ulster lineup: 1. Bryan Young, 2. Paul Shields, 3. Simon Best, 4. Justin Harrison, 5. Tim Barker, 6. Stephen Ferris, 7. Kieron Dawson, 8. Roger Wilson, 9. Isaac Boss, 10. David Humphreys, 11. Andrew Trimble, 12. Paddy Wallace, 13. Paul Steinmetz, 14. Tommy Bowe, 15. Bryn Cunningham.; Replacements: 16. Stuart Philpott (for Shields), 17. Justin Fitzpatrick (for B. Young), 18. Ryan Caldwell (for Barker), 19. Sam Harding (for Dawson), 20. Kieran Campbell (for Boss), 21. Paul McKenzie (for Humphreys), 22. Kevin Maggs (for Steinmetz).				Attendance: 5,641

23 March 2007	Ulster (Ireland)	21 – 24	(Ireland) Munster	Ravenhill, Belfast
19:30	Try: Steinmetz; Wilson; Trimble; Con: Humphreys	Report	Try: O'Sullivan; Halstead; Carney; Con: Manning (2); Hickey; Pen: Hickey; Cards: Buckley (yellow card)	Attendance: 12,900
Ulster lineup: 1. Justin Fitzpatrick, 2. Rory Best, 3. Bryan Young, 4. Justin Harrison, 5. Ryan Caldwell, 6. Stephen Ferris, 7. Kieron Dawson, 8. Roger Wilson, 9. Isaac Boss, 10. David Humphreys, 11. Paul Steinmetz, 12. Paddy Wallace, 13. Andrew Trimble, 14. Tommy Bowe, 15. Bryn Cunningham.; Replacements: 16. Paul Shields, 17. Declan Fitzpatrick (for J. Fitzpatrick), 18. Tim Barker (for Caldwell), 19. David Pollock (for Ferris), 20. Kieran Campbell, 21. Paul McKenzie (for Steinmetz), 22. Andy Maxwell (for Humphreys).				Attendance: 12,900

13 April 2007	Border Reivers (Scotland)	9 – 33	(Ireland) Ulster	Netherdale, Galashiels
19:30	Pen: Jones (3)	Report	Try: Cunningham; Maxwell; Ferris; Con: Humphreys (3); Pen: Humphreys (4); Cards: Caldwell (yellow card)	Attendance: 3,252
Ulster lineup: 1. Bryan Young, 2. Rory Best, 3. Simon Best, 4. Justin Harrison, 5. Ryan Caldwell, 6. Stephen Ferris, 7. Neil Best, 8. Roger Wilson, 9. Isaac Boss, 10. David Humphreys, 11. Andy Maxwell, 12. Paddy Wallace, 13. Andrew Trimble, 14. Tommy Bowe, 15. Bryn Cunningham.; Replacements: 16. Paul Shields, 17. Justin Fitzpatrick (for B. Young), 18. Tim Barker (for Caldwell), 19. David Pollock (for Wilson), 20. Kieran Campbell (for Boss), 21. Darren Cave (for Wallace), 22. Paul McKenzie.				Attendance: 3,252

20 April 2007	Cardiff Blues (Wales)	20 – 17	(Ireland) Ulster	Cardiff Arms Park
19:10	Try: Shanklin; Czekaj; Con: Macleod; Blair; Pen: Blair; Drop: Macleod	Report	Try: Wilson; Trimble; Con: Steinmetz (2); Pen: Steinmetz; Cards: Trimble (yellow card)	Attendance: 6,354
Ulster lineup: 1. Bryan Young, 2. Paul Shields, 3. Simon Best, 4. Justin Harrison, 5. Ryan Caldwell, 6. Stephen Ferris, 7. Neil Best, 8. Roger Wilson, 9. Isaac Boss, 10. Paddy Wallace, 11. Andy Maxwell, 12. Paul Steinmetz, 13. Andrew Trimble, 14. Tommy Bowe, 15. Bryn Cunningham.; Replacements: 16. Nigel Brady, 17. Justin Fitzpatrick, 18. Tim Barker (for Caldwell), 19. Kevin Maggs, 20. Kieran Campbell (for Boss), 21. Neil McMillan (for Ferris), 22. Paul McKenzie.				Attendance: 6,354

27 April 2007	Ulster (Ireland)	10 – 24	(Scotland) Glasgow Warriors	Ravenhill, Belfast
19:30	Try: Maxwell; Trimble	Report	Try: Beattie; Barclay; Lamont; Con: Parks (3); Pen: Parks; Cards: Swindall (yellow card)	Attendance: 8,056
Ulster lineup: 1. Bryan Young, 2. Rory Best, 3. Simon Best, 4. Justin Harrison, 5. Ryan Caldwell, 6. Stephen Ferris, 7. Neil Best, 8. Roger Wilson, 9. Isaac Boss, 10. Paddy Wallace, 11. Andy Maxwell, 12. Paul Steinmetz, 13. Andrew Trimble, 14. Tommy Bowe, 15. Bryn Cunningham.; Replacements: 16. Paul Shields, 17. Justin Fitzpatrick (for B. Young), 18. Tim Barker (for Caldwell), 19. Neil McMillan (for Ferris), 20. Kieran Campbell (for Boss), 21. David Humphreys (for Wallace), 22. Paul McKenzie (for Cunningham).				Attendance: 8,056

11 May 2007	Ulster (Ireland)	16 – 10	(Scotland) Edinburgh	Ravenhill, Belfast
19:30	Try: Maxwell; Con: Wallace; Pen: Wallace (3)	Report	Try: Murray; Con: Hodge; Pen: Hodge; Cards: Hogg (yellow card)	Attendance: 7,429
Ulster lineup: 1. Bryan Young, 2. Rory Best, 3. Simon Best, 4. Justin Harrison, 5. Tim Barker, 6. Neil Best, 7. Stephen Ferris, 8. Roger Wilson, 9. Isaac Boss, 10. Paddy Wallace, 11. Andy Maxwell, 12. Paul Steinmetz, 13. Andrew Trimble, 14. Paul McKenzie, 15. Tommy Bowe.; Replacements: 16. Nigel Brady, 17. Justin Fitzpatrick (for B. Young), 18. Chris Henry, 19. Neil McMillan, 20. Kieran Campbell, 21. David Humphreys, 22. Darren Cave.				Attendance: 7,429

== Home attendance ==
Domestic League					European Cup					Total	
League	Fixtures	Average Attendance	Highest	Lowest	League	Fixtures	Average Attendance	Highest	Lowest	Total Attendance	Average Attendance
2006–07 Celtic League	10	10,207	12,900	7,429	2006–07 Heineken Cup	3	12,599	12,772	12,278	139,862	10,759

== Friendlies ==
18 August 2006	Border Reivers (Scotland)	7-36	(Ireland) Ulster	University of St Andrews
	Try: Law; Con: McCrea	Report	Try: Maxwell (2); Young; Dawson; Pollock; Pehi; Con: Humphreys (2); Larkin

25 August 2006	Ulster (Ireland)	26-14	(England) Rotherham Titans	Ravenhill, Belfast
	Try: McMillan; Maxwell (2); Wallace; Con: Humphreys (2); Steinmetz	Report	Try: Feely; Jacobson; Con: Whitehead (2)	Referee: P. Fitzgibbon
Ulster lineup: 1. Justin Fitzpatrick, 2. Paul Shields, 3. Tom Court, 4. Justin Harrison, 5. Tim Barker, 6. Kieron Dawson, 7. Neil McMillan, 8. Stephen Ferris, 9. Kieran Campbell, 10. David Humphreys, 11. Andy Maxwell, 12. Paul Steinmetz, 13. Paddy Wallace, 14. Mark Bartholomeusz, 15. Bryn Cunningham.; Replacements: Declan Fitzpatrick (for Court 25-70'), Kevin Maggs (for Humphreys 40'), Scott Young (for Cunningham 54'), Lewis Stevenson (for Harrison 60'), Stuart Philpott (for Shields 70'), Paul Marshall (for Campbell 74).				Referee: P. Fitzgibbon

== Ulster Rugby Awards ==
The Ulster Rugby Awards ceremony was held at the Ramada Hotel on 17 May 2007. Winners were:

- Bank of Ireland Ulster Player of the Year: Roger Wilson
- Guinness Ulster Rugby Personality of the Year: Rory Best
- Vodofone Ulster Young Player of the Year: David Pollock
- Kukri Sportswear Club of the Year: Dungannon RFC
- First Trust Club Player of the Year: Paul Magee, Dungannon
- Ken Goodall Award for Outstanding Player at the Sports Institute: Thomas Anderson
- Northern Bank Schools Player of the Year: James Sandford, The Royal School, Armagh
- Calor Gas Youth Player of the Year: David McGregor
- Belfast Telegraph Merit Award: Simon McDowell
- Dorrington B. Faulkner Award: Walter Lindsay, Civil Service Rugby Club
