= 2002–03 Ulster Rugby season =

Professional provincial Rugby Union playing season

- Ground: Ravenhill Stadium (Capacity: 12,500)
- CEO: Michael Reid
- Coach: Alan Solomons
- Captain: Andy Ward
- Most appearances: Neil Doak (15)
- Top scorer: David Humphreys (128)
- Most tries: Neil Doak (3); Tyrone Howe (3); Neil McMillan (3)
- League(s): Heineken Cup (3rd in pool); Celtic League (semi-finalists)

The 2002–03 season was Ulster Rugby's eighth under professionalism, and their second under head coach Alan Solomons. They competed in the Heineken Cup and the Celtic League. No IRFU Interprovincial Championship was held this season.

In the Celtic League, they finished third in Pool A, qualifying for the playoffs. They beat Glasgow in the quarter-finals, but lost to Munster in the semi-finals. In the Heineken Cup, they finished third in Pool 6, missing out on the knockout stage. Bryn Cunningham was Ulster's Player of the Year. Flanker Neil McMillan won the IRUPA Young Player of the Year award.

== Staff ==
Position	Name	Nationality
Chief Executive	Michael Reid	Ireland
Director of Rugby	Alan Solomons	South Africa
Team manager	John McComish	Ireland
Forwards coach	Adrian Kennedy	Ireland
Backs coach	Mark McCall	Ireland
Assistant conditioning coach	John McCloskey	Ireland
Physiotherapist	Gareth Robinson	Ireland
Director of Elite Player Development	Allen Clarke	Ireland

== Pre-season ==
=== Players in ===
- (Ireland) Neil Best from (Ireland) Belfast Harlequins
- (Ireland) Nigel Brady from (Ireland) Dungannon
- (South Africa) Warren Brosnihan from (South Africa) Natal Sharks
- (South Africa) Robbi Kempson from (South Africa) Western Province
- (Ireland) David Spence from (Ireland) Queen's University

=== Players out ===
- (Australia) David Allen (retired due to injury)
- (South Africa) Robby Brink (retired)
- (Australia) Mark Crick (work permit expired)
- (Argentina) Leopoldo de Chazal (released)
- (Australia) Brad Free (emigrated)
- (Ireland) Mike Haslett to (England) London Irish
- (Ireland) Paddy Johns (retired)
- (Ireland) Aidan Kearney to (Ireland) Leinster
- (Ireland) Niall Malone (released)
- (Ireland) Richard Weir (released)

== Squad ==
Ulster Rugby squad
**Props**: (South Africa) **Robbi Kempson** (14 apps, 14 starts); (Ireland) **Justin Fitzpatrick** (14 apps, 11 starts); (Ireland) Simon Best (8 apps, 5 starts); (Ireland) Clem Boyd; **Hookers**: (New Zealand) Matt Sexton (14 apps, 14 starts, 5 pts); (Ireland) Paul Shields (8 apps, 1 start, 5 pts); **Locks**: (Ireland) **Jeremy Davidson** (11 apps, 11 starts); (Ireland) **Gary Longwell** (10 apps, 10 starts); (Ireland) Mark Blair (11 apps, 8 starts); (Ireland) Paddy Johns (1 app); (Ireland) Matt McCullough	**Back row**: (Ireland) Neil McMillan (14 apps, 14 starts, 15 pts); (South Africa) **Warren Brosnihan** (13 apps, 13 starts, 5 pts); (Ireland) Tony McWhirter (14 apps, 12 starts, 5 pts); (Ireland) **Andy Ward** (c) (7 apps, 5 starts, 10 pts); (South Africa) Russell Nelson (4 apps, 2 starts); (Ireland) Neil Best (7 apps, 10 pts); **Scrum-halves**: (Ireland) Neil Doak (15 apps, 15 starts, 48 pts); (Ireland) Kieran Campbell (4 apps); (Ireland) David Spence; **Fly-halves**: (Ireland) **David Humphreys** (11 apps, 11 starts, 128 pts); (Ireland) Paddy Wallace (3 apps, 2 starts, 23 pts)	**Centres**: (Ireland) **Jonny Bell** (10 apps, 10 starts, 5 pts); (Australia) **Ryan Constable** (10 apps, 8 starts); (New Zealand) Shane Stewart (10 apps, 8 starts, 5 pts); (Australia) Adam Larkin (10 apps, 6 starts); (Ireland) Jan Cunningham (3 apps, 1 start, 5 pts); **Wings**: (Ireland) **James Topping** (12 apps, 12 starts, 5 pts); (Ireland) **Tyrone Howe** (8 apps, 8 starts, 15 pts); (Ireland) Scott Young (8 apps, 5 starts, 5 pts); (Ireland) Sheldon Coulter (8 apps, 5 starts); **Fullbacks**: (Ireland) Bryn Cunningham (14 apps, 14 starts, 8 pts)
(c) denotes the team captain, **Bold** denotes internationally capped players.^{*} denotes players qualified to play for Ireland on residency or dual nationality.

== Season record ==
Competition	Played	Won	Drawn	Lost	PF	PA	PD	TF	TA
2002-03 Heineken Cup	6	4	0	2	116	106	10	8	8
2002-03 Celtic League	9	6	0	3	203	170	33	18	15
Total	15	10	0	5	319	276	43	26	23

== 2002–03 Heineken Cup ==
=== Pool 6 ===
Team	P	W	D	L	Tries for	Tries against	Try diff	Points for	Points against	Points diff	Pts
(England) Northampton Saints	6	4	0	2	21	10	11	172	110	62	8
(France) Biarritz Olympique	6	4	0	2	14	5	9	138	73	65	8
(Ireland) Ulster	6	4	0	2	8	8	0	116	106	10	8
(Wales) Cardiff	6	0	0	6	6	26	−20	78	215	−137	0

13 October 2002	Northampton Saints (England)	32 – 9	(Ireland) Ulster	Franklin's Gardens, Northampton
16:30	Try: Dawson; Leslie; Con: Grayson (2); Pen: Grayson (5)	Report; Match centre	Pen: Humphreys (2); Doak	Attendance: 9,481; Referee: A. Lambardi
Ulster lineup: 1. Justin Fitzpatrick, 2. Matt Sexton, 3. Robbi Kempson, 4. Gary Longwell, 5. Mark Blair, 6. Warren Brosnihan, 7. Neil McMillan, 8. Tony McWhirter, 9. Neil Doak, 10. David Humphreys (c), 11. Tyrone Howe, 12. Jonny Bell, 13. Shane Stewart, 14. James Topping, 15. Bryn Cunningham.; Replacements: Adam Larkin (for Humphreys, 50), Simon Best				Attendance: 9,481; Referee: A. Lambardi

18 October 2002	Ulster (Ireland)	25 – 6	(Wales) Cardiff	Ravenhill, Belfast
19:05	Try: Young; Con: Humphreys; Pen: Humphreys (5); Drop: Humphreys	Report; Match centre	Pen: Harris (2)	Attendance: 11,000
Ulster lineup: 1. Justin Fitzpatrick, 2. Matt Sexton, 3. Robbi Kempson, 4. Gary Longwell, 5. Mark Blair, 6. Warren Brosnihan, 7. Neil McMillan, 8. Tony McWhirter, 9. Neil Doak, 10. David Humphreys (c), 11. Tyrone Howe, 12. Jonny Bell, 13. Shane Stewart, 14. James Topping, 15. Bryn Cunningham.; Replacements: Scott Young (for Howe, 9), Neil Best (for McWhirter, 59), Paul Shields (for Sexton, 65), Adam Larkin (for Bell, 75), Kieran Campbell (for Stewart, 79)				Attendance: 11,000

6 December 2002	Ulster (Ireland)	13 – 9	(France) Biarritz	Ravenhill, Belfast
19:15	Try: Topping; Con: Humphreys; Pen: Humphreys (2)	Report; Match centre	Pen: Yachvili (2); Drop: Peyrelongue	Attendance: 11,650; Referee: Chris White
Ulster lineup: 1. Justin Fitzpatrick, 2. Matt Sexton, 3. Robbi Kempson, 4. Gary Longwell, 5. Jeremy Davidson, 6. Warren Brosnihan, 7. Neil McMillan, 8. Andy Ward (c), 9. Neil Doak, 10. David Humphreys (c), 11. Scott Young, 12. Jonny Bell, 13. Ryan Constable, 14. James Topping, 15. Bryn Cunningham.; Replacements: Adam Larkin (for Constable, 2), Sheldon Coulter (for Bell, 80)				Attendance: 11,650; Referee: Chris White

14 December 2002	Biarritz (France)	25 – 20	(Ireland) Ulster	Parc des Sports Aguiléra, Biarritz
15:00	Try: Isaac; Couzinet; Cassin; Con: Yachvili (2); Pen: Yachvili (2)	Report; Match centre	Try: J. Cunningham; Ward; Con: Doak (2); Pen: Doak (2)	Attendance: 8,000; Referee: D. Pearson
Ulster lineup: 1. Justin Fitzpatrick, 2. Matt Sexton, 3. Robbi Kempson, 4. Gary Longwell, 5. Jeremy Davidson, 6. Warren Brosnihan, 7. Neil McMillan, 8. Andy Ward (c), 9. Neil Doak, 10. Adam Larkin, 11. Scott Young, 12. Jonny Bell, 13. Jan Cunningham, 14. James Topping, 15. Bryn Cunningham.; Replacements: Sheldon Coulter (for Bell, 4), Simon Best (for Fitzpatrick, 61), Paul Shields (for Sexton, 61), Mark Blair (for Longwell, 61), Tony McWhirter (for McMillan, 61).				Attendance: 8,000; Referee: D. Pearson

11 January 2003	Cardiff (Wales)	21 – 33	(Ireland) Ulster	Cardiff Arms Park
14:45	Try: Walne, Allen; Con: Robinson; Pen: Robinson (3)	Report; Match centre	Try: McMillan (2) penalty try Con: Humphreys (3); Pen: Humphreys (2); Drop: B. Cunningham	Attendance: 4,000; Referee: R. Goodcliffe
Ulster lineup: 1. Robbi Kempson, 2. Matt Sexton, 3. Simon Best, 4. Gary Longwell, 5. Jeremy Davidson, 6. Andy Ward (c), 7. Neil McMillan, 8. Tony McWhirter, 9. Neil Doak, 10. David Humphreys (c), 11. Sheldon Coulter, 12. Shane Stewart, 13. Ryan Constable, 14. James Topping, 15. Bryn Cunningham.; Replacements: Paul Shields (for Sexton), Russell Nelson (for McWhirter), Clem Boyd.				Attendance: 4,000; Referee: R. Goodcliffe

17 January 2003	Ulster (Ireland)	16 – 13	(England) Northampton Saints	Ravenhill, Belfast
19:05	Try: McMillan; Con: Humphreys; Pen: Doak; Drop: Humphreys (2)	Report; Match centre	Try: Cohen; Con: Grayson; Pen: Grayson (2)	Attendance: 12,500; Referee: Joel Dume
Ulster lineup: 1. Robbi Kempson, 2. Matt Sexton, 3. Simon Best, 4. Gary Longwell, 5. Jeremy Davidson, 6. Andy Ward (c), 7. Neil McMillan, 8. Tony McWhirter, 9. Neil Doak, 10. David Humphreys, 11. Sheldon Coulter, 12. Shane Stewart, 13. Ryan Constable, 14. James Topping, 15. Bryn Cunningham.; Replacements: Justin Fitzpatrick (for Best, 61), Russell Nelson (for McWhirter, 69).				Attendance: 12,500; Referee: Joel Dume

== 2002-03 Celtic League ==
=== Pool A ===
	Team	Pld	W	D	L	PF	PA	PD	TF	TA	Try bonus	Losing bonus	Pts
1	(Ireland) Munster	7	6	0	1	227	129	+98	25	12	4	0	28
2	(Scotland) Edinburgh	7	6	0	1	231	145	+86	24	13	2	1	27
3	(Ireland) Ulster	7	5	0	2	173	111	+62	15	9	1	1	22
4	(Wales) Neath	7	4	0	3	153	121	+32	15	12	1	1	18
5	(Wales) Llanelli	7	3	0	4	191	168	+23	23	16	3	2	17
6	(Wales) Swansea	7	3	0	4	177	212	−35	18	22	3	1	16
7	(Wales) Ebbw Vale	7	1	0	6	140	226	−86	16	27	1	0	5
8	(Wales) Caerphilly	7	0	0	7	144	324	−180	17	42	2	1	3
Under the standard bonus point system, points are awarded as follows: 4 points for a win; 2 points for a draw; 1 bonus point for scoring 4 tries (or more) (Try bonus); 1 bonus point for losing by 7 points (or fewer) (Losing bonus)
Green background (rows 1 to 4) qualify for the knock-out stage. Source: RaboDirect PRO12

30 August 2002	Ebbw Vale (Wales)	0 – 19	(Ireland) Ulster	Eugene Cross Park, Ebbw Vale
19:15	Cards: Thomas (yellow card)	Report; Match centre	Try: Wallace; Con: Humphreys; Pen: Humphreys (4)	Referee: Dave Pearson
Ulster lineup: 1. Robbi Kempson, 2. Matt Sexton, 3. Simon Best, 4. Gary Longwell, 5. Jeremy Davidson, 6. Andy Ward (c), 7. Warren Brosnihan, 8. Tony McWhirter, 9. Neil Doak, 10. David Humphreys, 11. Tyrone Howe, 12. Jonny Bell, 13. Ryan Constable, 14. Sheldon Coulter, 15. Paddy Wallace.; Replacements: Mark Blair (for Davidson 30'), Justin Fitzpatrick (for S. Best 67').				Referee: Dave Pearson

6 September 2002	Ulster (Ireland)	18 – 19	(Scotland) Edinburgh	Ravenhill, Belfast
19:30	Pen: Wallace (6); Cards: N.Best (yellow card)	Report; Match centre	Try: Laney; Con: Laney; Pen: Laney (3); Drop: Hodge; Cards: Taylor (yellow card)	Attendance: 7,500
Ulster lineup: 1. Robbi Kempson, 2. Matt Sexton, 3. Simon Best, 4. Mark Blair, 5. Tony McWhirter, 6. Warren Brosnihan, 7. Neil McMillan, 8. Russell Nelson, 9. Neil Doak, 10. Paddy Wallace, 11. Tyrone Howe, 12. Jonny Bell, 13. Ryan Constable, 14. Sheldon Coulter, 15. Bryn Cunningham.; Replacements: Justin Fizpatrick (for S. Best 21') Neil Best (for McMillan 21').				Attendance: 7,500

14 September 2002	Swansea (Wales)	38 – 10	(Ireland) Ulster	St Helen's, Swansea
14:30	Try: K. Morgan; Robinson; Gibbs; Payne; Con: A. Thomas (3); Pen: A. Thomas (4)	Report; Match centre	Try: Howe; Con: Humphreys; Pen: Humphreys	Attendance: 2,500
Ulster lineup: 1. Justin Fitzpatrick, 2. Matt Sexton, 3. Robbi Kempson, 4. Mark Blair, 5. Jeremy Davidson, 6. Warren Brosnihan, 7. Neil McMillan, 8. Russell Nelson; 9. Neil Doak, 10. David Humphreys, 11. Tyrone Howe, 12. Adam Larkin, 13. Jonny Bell (c), 14. James Topping, 15. Bryn Cunningham.; Replacements: Neil Best (for Brosnihan 39-40'; for Nelson 40'), Paddy Wallace (for Humphreys 55'), Ryan Constable (for Bell 60'), Kieran Campbell (for Sexton 60'), Simon Best (for Fitzpatrick 62'), Tony McWhirter (for Davidson 65-78').				Attendance: 2,500

20 September 2002	Ulster (Ireland)	17 – 13	(Wales) Neath	Ravenhill, Belfast
19:30	Try: B. Cunningham; Howe; Con: Doak (2); Pen: Doak; Cards: Brosnihan (yellow card)	Report; Match centre	Try: S. Williams; Con: Jarvis; Pen: Jarvis (2); Cards: Jones (yellow card)	Attendance: 9,500
Ulster lineup: 1. Justin Fitzpatrick, 2. Paul Shields, 3. Simon Best, 4. Mark Blair, 5. Jeremy Davidson (C), 6. Warren Brosnihan, 7. Neil McMillan, 8. Tony McWhirter, 9. Neil Doak, 10. Adam Larkin, 11. Tyrone Howe, 12. Shane Stewart, 13. Ryan Constable, 14. James Topping, 15. Bryn Cunningham.; Replacements: Neil Best (for McWhirter 74'), Jan Cunningham (for Stewart 80').				Attendance: 9,500

27 September 2002	Ulster (Ireland)	26 – 17	(Ireland) Munster	Ravenhill, Belfast
19:35	Try: Doak (2); Con: Doak (2); Pen: Doak (2); Cards: McWhirter (yellow card)	Report; Match centre	Try: Lawler; Pen: Staunton (2); Drop: Staunton; Holland	Attendance: 6,000; Referee: P. Adams
Ulster lineup: 1. Justin Fitzpatrick, 2. Matt Sexton, 3. Robbi Kempson, 4. Mark Blair, 5. Jeremy Davidson (C), 6. Warren Brosnihan, 7. Neil McMillan, 8. Tony McWhirter, 9. Neil Doak, 10. Adam Larkin, 11. Tyrone Howe, 12. Jonny Bell, 13. Ryan Constable, 14. James Topping, 15. Bryn Cunningham.; Replacements: Scott Young (for Topping 34'), Paul Shields (for Sexton 54'), Paddy Johns (for Davidson 58'), Shane Stewart (for Bell 74'), Neil Best (for Brosnihan 80').				Attendance: 6,000; Referee: P. Adams

5 October 2002	Caerphilly (Wales)	15 – 67	(Ireland) Ulster	Virginia Park, Caerphilly
14:30	Try: Chiltern (2); Con: McLaughlin; Pen: McLaughlin	Report; Match centre	Try: Neil Best (2); Howe; Brosnihan; McWhirter; Stewart; Bell; Sexton; Con: Humphreys (6); Pen: Humphreys (5); Cards: Sexton (yellow card); Kempson (yellow card)	Attendance: 750
Ulster lineup: 1. Justin Fitzpatrick, 2. Matt Sexton, 3. Robbi Kempson, 4. Gary Longwell, 5. Jeremy Davidson, 6. Warren Brosnihan, 7. Neil McMillan, 8. Tony McWhirter, 9. Neil Doak, 10. David Humphreys, 11. Tyrone Howe, 12. Jonny Bell, 13. Ryan Constable, 14. Scott Young, 15. Bryn Cunningham.; Replacements: Shane Stewart (for Constable 7'), Neil Best (for Fitzpatrick 50'), Mark Blair (for Longwell 55'), Kieran Campbell (for Doak 60'), Paul Shields (for McMillan 32-40', for Sexton 60'), Adam Larkin (for Bell 65').				Attendance: 750

25 October 2002	Ulster (Ireland)	16 – 9	(Wales) Llanelli	Ravenhill, Belfast
19:35	Try: Doak; Con: Humphreys; Pen: Humphreys; Drop: Humphreys	Report; Match centre	Pen: Jones (3)	Attendance: 10,500; Referee: John Hogg
Ulster lineup: 1. Justin Fitzpatrick, 2. Matt Sexton, 3. Robbi Kempson, 4. Gary Longwell, 5. Mark Blair, 6. Warren Brosnihan, 7. Neil McMillan, 8. Tony McWhirter, 9. Neil Doak, 10. David Humphreys, 11. Scott Young, 12. Adam Larkin, 13. Shane Stewart, 14. James Topping, 15. Bryn Cunningham.; Replacements: Sheldon Coulter (for Topping 39'), Neil Best (for McWhirter 74').				Attendance: 10,500; Referee: John Hogg

=== Quarter final ===
30 November 2002	Glasgow (Scotland)	17 – 20	(Ireland) Ulster	Hughenden, Glasgow
14:45	Try: Steel; Pen: Hayes (4)	Report; Match centre	Try: Shields; Ward; Con: Humphreys (2); Pen: Humphreys (2)	Attendance: 5,346
Ulster lineup: 1. Justin Fitzpatrick, 2. Matt Sexton, 3. Robbi Kempson, 4. Mark Blair, 5. Jeremy Davidson, 6. Warren Brosnihan, 7. Neil McMillan, 8. Tony McWhirter, 9. Neil Doak, 10. David Humphreys, 11. Scott Young, 12. Jonny Bell, 13. Shane Stewart, 14. James Topping, 15. Bryn Cunningham.; Replacements: Paul Shields (for Sexton 25'), Andy Ward (for McWhirter 47'), Ryan Constable (for Stewart 47').				Attendance: 5,346

=== Semi-final ===
3 January 2003	Munster (Ireland)	42 – 10	(Ireland) Ulster	Thomond Park, Limerick
19:35	Try: Hayes; Quinlan; Kelly; Mullins; Galwey; Con: O'Gara (3), Keane; Pen: O'Gara (3); Cards: Sheahan (yellow card); Quinlan (yellow card)	Report; Match centre	Try: Humphreys; Con: Humphreys; Pen: Humphreys; Cards: Fitzpatrick (red card)	Attendance: 12,000; Referee: H. Watkins
Ulster lineup: 1. Justin Fitzpatrick, 2. Matt Sexton, 3. Robbi Kempson, 4. Gary Longwell, 5. Jeremy Davidson, 6. Warren Brosnihan, 7. Neil McMillan, 8. Tony McWhirter, 9. Neil Doak, 10. David Humphreys (c), 11. Sheldon Coulter, 12. Adam Larkin, 13. Shane Stewart, 14. James Topping, 15. Bryn Cunningham.; Replacements: Simon Best (for McMillan 17'), Jan Cunningham (for Larkin 34'), Scott Young (for B. Cunningham 48'), Andy Ward (for McWhirter 48'), Paul Shields (for Sexton 65'), Kieran Campbell (for Doak 76').				Attendance: 12,000; Referee: H. Watkins

== Home attendance ==
Domestic League					European Cup					Total	
League	Fixtures	Average Attendance	Highest	Lowest	League	Fixtures	Average Attendance	Highest	Lowest	Total Attendance	Average Attendance
2002–03 Celtic League	4	8,375	10,500	6,000	2002–03 Heineken Cup	3	11,717	12,500	11,000	68,650	9,807

== Friendlies ==
9 August 2002	Scottish Borders (Scotland)	0-31	(Ireland) Ulster	Greenyards, Melrose
	Try: Ward; Davidson; Larkin; B. Cunningham; Con: Larkin (3)	Report

16 August 2002	Ulster (Ireland)	29-7	(England) Bedford Blues	Ravenhill, Belfast
	Try: B. Cunningham (2); Topping; Ward; Blair; Con: Larkin (2)	Report	Try: Pritchard; Con: Pritchard
Ulster lineup: 1. Justin Fitzpatrick, Matt Sexton, 3. Clem Boyd, 4. Mark Blair, 5. Jeremy Davidson, 6. Andy Ward (c), 7. Russell Nelson, 8. Neil McMillan, 9. Kieran Campbell, 10. Adam Larkin, 11. Jan Cunningham, 12. Jonny Bell, 13. Ryan Constable, 14. James Topping, 15. Bryn Cunningham.; Replacements: Paul Shields (for Sexton 40'), Robbi Kempson (for Fitzpatrick 50'), Reece Spee (for Campbell 75'), Neil Best (for Nelson 80').

23 August 2002	Ulster (Ireland)	19-19	(Scotland) Glasgow	Ravenhill, Belfast
	Try: Sexton; Young (2); Con: Larkin (2)	Report	Try: Hayes; Con: Hayes; Pen: Hayes (4)
Ulster lineup: 1. Justin Fitzpatrick, 2. Matt Sexton, 3. Clem Boyd, 4. Tony McWhirter, 5. Jeremy Davidson, 6. Andy Ward (c), 7. Warren Brosnihan, 8. Russell Nelson, 9. Neil Doak, 10. Adam Larkin, 11. Sheldon Coulter, 12. Jonny Bell, 13. Ryan Constable, 14. Shane Stewart, 15. Bryn Cunningham.; Replacements: Scott Young, Seamus Mallon, Kieran Campbell, Robbi Kempson, Paul Shields, Mark Blair, Robby Brink.

27 December 2002	Ulster XV (Ireland)	48-12	(Scotland) (Ireland) Celtic Warriors XV	Gibson Park, Belfast
	Try: Davidson; Blair; McMillan; Coulter; Topping; J. Cunningham; N. Best; Con: Doak (4)	Report	Try: Moir; Callaghan; Con: Longstaff
Ulster lineup: 1. Robbi Kempson, 2. Matt Sexton, 3. Justin Fitzpatrick, 4. Mark Blair, 5. Jeremy Davidson, 6. Warren Brosnihan, 7. Neil McMillan, 8. Tony McWhirter, 9. Neil Doak, 10. Kieran Campbell, 11. Jan Cunningham, 12. Sheldon Coulter, 13. Ryan Constable, 14. James Topping, 15. Scott Young.; Replacements: Neil Best (for Constable 40'), Roger Wilson (for Doak 58'), Paul Shields (for Sexton 60'), Simon Best (for Kempson 60').

== Ulster Rugby Awards ==
The Ulster Rugby Awards ceremony was held at the Ramada Hotel on 15 May 2003. Winners were:

- Ulster Player of the Year: Bryn Cunningham
- Guinness Rugby Personality of the Year: Allen Clarke
- Club Ulster Supporters Player of the Year: Robbi Kempson
- Schools Player of the Year: Andrew Trimble, Coleraine Academical Institution
- Club Team of the Year: Ballymena R.F.C.
- Dorrington Faulkner Award: Ivan Coffey
- Club PRO: John Dickson
- Youth Player of the Year: Stephen Ferris
- Coach of the Year: Tom McGaw
- Club of the Year: Ballynahinch RFC
- Merit Award: Scott Gardiner, Monaghan Rugby Club

== Ulster Women ==
=== Women's Interprovincial Series ===
17 August 2002	Munster	17-11	Ulster	Shannon RFC
	Try: Patrique Kelly; Fiona Steed; Amanda Greensmith; Con: Theresa Nolan	Report	Try: Cath Mullaley; Pen: Rachel Reid (2)

31 August 2002	Ulster	17-5	Leinster	Carrickfergus RFC
	Try: Maura McArdle; Joy Sparkes; Rachel Boyd]] Con: Rachel Reid	Report	Try: Grace Davitt

14 September 2002	Connacht	0-28	Ulster	The Sportsground, Galway
		Report	Try: Lorraine Colgan; Joy Sparkes; Suzanne Fleming; Rachel Baird; Con: Rachel Reid (4)

28 September 2002	Ulster	0-24	Munster	Dromore RFC
	Try: Fiona Steed (2); Lynn Cantwell; Amanda Greensmithj; Con: Vivien Boland (2)	Report

12 October 2002	Leinster	11-3	Ulster Rugby	Naas RFC
	Try: O Brennan; Pen: Grace Davitt (2)	Report	Pen: Rachel Reid; Cards: Rachel Boyd (yellow card)

2 November 2002	Ulster	75-5	Connacht	Ravenhill, Belfast
	Try: Ruth McCausland; M Fagan; Jolene Morton; Rachel Boyd; L McKinney (2); Lesley Coulter (2); S Hamilton (2); Paula Brustad (3); Con: L Fagan; Rachel Reid; Pen: Rachel Reid (2)	Report	Try: N ni Chadain
