= Paul McKenzie (rugby union) =

- Born: 23 January 1984 (age 42) Bangor, Northern Ireland
- Height: 1.80 m (5 ft 11 in)
- Weight: 93 kg (14 st 9 lb)
- School: Bangor Grammar School

Rugby union career
- Position: Centre
- Current team: Exeter Chiefs
International career
| Years | Team | Apps | (Points) |
| 2007 | Ireland A | 3 | (0) |

Paul McKenzie (born 23 January 1984) was an Irish rugby union footballer. He played centre, wing and full back for Exeter Chiefs as well as Ulster Rugby . He has played for Ireland under 19s, 20s and the Ireland A team.
