= Ulster Rugby =

Rugby union team in island of Ireland

- Nickname: The Ulstermen
- Founded: 1879; 147 years ago
- Location: Belfast, Northern Ireland
- Ground: Ravenhill Stadium (Capacity: 18,196)
- Chairman: Hugh McCaughey
- Coach: Richie Murphy
- Captain: Iain Henderson
- Most appearances: Rob Herring (270)
- Top scorer: David Humphreys (1,585)
- Most tries: Andrew Trimble (76)
- League: United Rugby Championship
- 2026–27: TBC
Team kit

Official website
- ulster.rugby
- Current season

Ulster Rugby is one of the four professional provincial rugby union teams from the island of Ireland. They compete in the Irish regional pool of the United Rugby Championship and in the European Rugby Champions Cup, each of which they have won once. Ulster were the first Irish team and the first team outside England and France to win the European Cup in 1999.

The team represents the IRFU Ulster Branch, which is one of the four primary branches of the IRFU and is responsible for rugby union throughout the geographical Irish province of Ulster, comprising Northern Ireland (Antrim, Armagh, Down, Fermanagh, Londonderry and Tyrone) and three counties in the Republic of Ireland which are Donegal, Monaghan and Cavan.

Prior to professionalisation, Ulster were a representative amateur team taking part in the IRFU Interprovincial Championship. They have also competed in the now defunct Celtic Cup (2003–05). Their development team, Ulster A, formerly known as the Ulster Ravens, have competed in the British and Irish Cup (2009–18) and a revived Celtic Cup (2018–20).

The Ulster women's team compete in the IRFU Women's Interprovincial Series.

== History ==
=== Foundation (1868–1879) ===
Map of IRFU provincial branches

A number of clubs were operating in Ulster prior to the foundation of the Irish Rugby Football Union and the Ulster branch. The Belfast-based North of Ireland F.C., founded in 1868, was the earliest club to operate in the province. Clubs from this era still in existence include Dungannon and Queen's University. The first Irish inter-provincial game took place in 1875 between Ulster and Leinster, with Ulster being the victors. In Ireland's first international match, which was played in 1875 against England, eight Ulster-based players took part. Rugby in Ulster at this time was mostly overseen by the Irish Football Union, with the Northern Football Union of Ireland controlling the game in Belfast. The two unions amalgamated in 1879, with the provincial branches of Ulster, Leinster and Munster being founded as part of the terms of this arrangement. The final Irish provincial side, Connacht, was founded in 1885.

=== Amateur era (1879–1995) ===
During the amateur era Irish players primarily played for their respective clubs, with provincial games effectively treated as Irish trial matches. The provincial teams were also used to provide competitive club opposition for touring international sides. Inter-provincial games were played on an irregular basis but starting in the 1946–47 season, the provinces played against each other in the annual Irish Interprovincial Championship. Ulster won this tournament 26 times in total, with eight of these titles being shared.

Ulster first appointed a coach in 1969. The first three coaches enjoyed great success in the Interprovincial Championship. Under Ken Armstrong Ulster won the title unbeaten in 1969 and 1970, and finished second, losing only once, in 1971. He was succeeded by Maurice Crabbe, under whom Ulster shared the title in 1972, came third in 1973, and won it in 1974. George Spotswood then led Ulster to a shared title in 1975, an unbeaten championship in 1976, and another shared title in 1976. Under Cecil Watson, Ulster came third in 1978 and fourth in 1979, and came third in 1980 under Matt Gillen, before form began to return under Willie John McBride, who led them to second place in 1981 and a shared title in 1982.

Their most sustained period of success began under Jimmy Davidson. In his first season, 1983, Ulster finished third, before he led them to three straight undefeated championships in 1984–86. Harry Williams succeeded him, and under him Ulster shared the title in 1987 and won three straight undefeated titles in 1988–90. Then Davy McMaster led Ulster to two undefeated titles in 1991 and 1992, and a shared title in 1991. Under these three coaches, Ulster won or shared ten Interprovincial Championships in a row.

Brian Bloomfield was the final coach of the amateur era, coming joint second in 1994.

=== Transition to professionalism (1995-2001) ===
After rugby union was declared open to professionalism in 1995, the IRFU gradually developed the provincial sides as professional teams. The Heineken Cup was launched in 1995 to provide a new level of European cross-border competition. Ireland chose to enter provincial teams rather than clubs. They were given three places, and entered the top three teams in the Interprovincial Championship. In their first professional season, under Brian Bloomfield, Ulster finished bottom of their Heineken Cup group, but qualified for the following season by finishing second in the Interprovincial Championship. The following season, coached by Tony Russ, they finished fourth of five in the pool stage of the Heineken Cup, and third in the Interprovincial Championship. Russ quit, and was replaced by Davy Haslett for the 1997-98 season. Ulster finished fourth of four in the pool stage of the Heineken Cup, and third in the Interprovincial Championship. The Ulster Rugby Awards were launched this season, with Andy Ward named player of the year.

For the 1998-99 season, Harry Williams returned as coach, and Ulster benefited from a drive by the IRFU to bring Irish players who had signed contracts in England back to Ireland, with David Humphreys, Mark McCall, Jonny Bell, Allen Clarke and Mark Blair returning to the province, and Simon Mason and Justin Fitzpatrick joining for the first time. Captained by Humphreys, Ulster became the first Irish province to win the Heineken Cup, beating French side Colomiers 21–6 in the final at Lansdowne Road in Dublin. The Provincial Championship expanded to a six-game, home and away schedule, and Ulster finished second. Simon Mason was player of the year.

Williams coached Ulster for two more seasons, but success eluded them. In 1999-2000, they finished bottom of their pool in the Heineken Cup and second in the Interprovincial Championship. Tony McWhirter was player of the year. In 2000-01, they again finished bottom of their Heineken Cup pool, and second in the Interprovincial Championship. Tyrone Howe was player of the year.

=== Launch of the Celtic League (2001-2003) ===
In 2001-2002, Ulster appointed former Stormers head coach and Springboks assistant coach Alan Solomons as head coach. The Celtic League, featuring all four Irish provinces as well as teams from Scotland and Wales, launched this season, beginning as a seven-game round-robin tournament with playoffs. Ulster finished second in Pool A, defeated Neath in the quarter-finals, but went out to Munster in the semi-finals. They finished second in their pool in the Heineken Cup, and second in the final Interprovincial Championship, based on games played between the provinces in the Celtic League, plus four additional matches at the end of the season. David Humphreys was player of the year, the Celtic League's leading scorer, and set a Heineken Cup record by scoring 37 points in one game.

The next season, Ulster finished third in their pool in the Heineken Cup, and third in their Celtic League pool, qualifying for the playoffs. They beat Glasgow in the quarter-finals, but again went out to Munster in the semis. They qualified for next season's Heineken Cup as the second placed Irish team in the Celtic League. Bryn Cunningham was player of the year.

=== Full professionalism (2003-2006) ===
In 2003-04, the Celtic League expanded to a twelve-team, 22-game home and away schedule, alongside a knockout Celtic Cup. This, alongside the Heineken Cup, meant the Irish provincial teams were now full-time professional operations - prior to this, players had time to play for their clubs in the All-Ireland League alongside their provincial commitments. Ulster finished second in the Celtic League, and won the Celtic Cup, defeating Edinburgh in the final. In the Heineken Cup, they finished third in their pool. Roger Wilson was player of the year. Alan Solomons left at the end of the season, boasting a three-year unbeaten home record in the Heineken Cup. He was replaced as head coach by Mark McCall.

The following season, Ulster finished third in their pool in the Heineken Cup, went out in the quarter-finals of the Celtic Cup, and finished eighth in the Celtic League, qualifying for next season's Heineken Cup as third placed Irish province. Neil Best was player of the year. In 2005-06, bolstered by the signing of Australian international lock Justin Harrison, Ulster won the Celtic League, the title decided on the last day of the season, with David Humphreys' 40-metre drop-goal against Ospreys edging them ahead of Leinster in the table. Tommy Bowe was the league's top try scorer with ten. They finished third in their pool in the Heineken Cup. Andrew Trimble was player of the year.

=== Decline (2006–2010) ===
Ulster started the 2006–07 season well, including beating Toulouse 30–3 in the Heineken Cup. But this form did not continue, they were eliminated from the competition early, and finished fifth in the Celtic League. Back row forward Roger Wilson was Player of the Year.

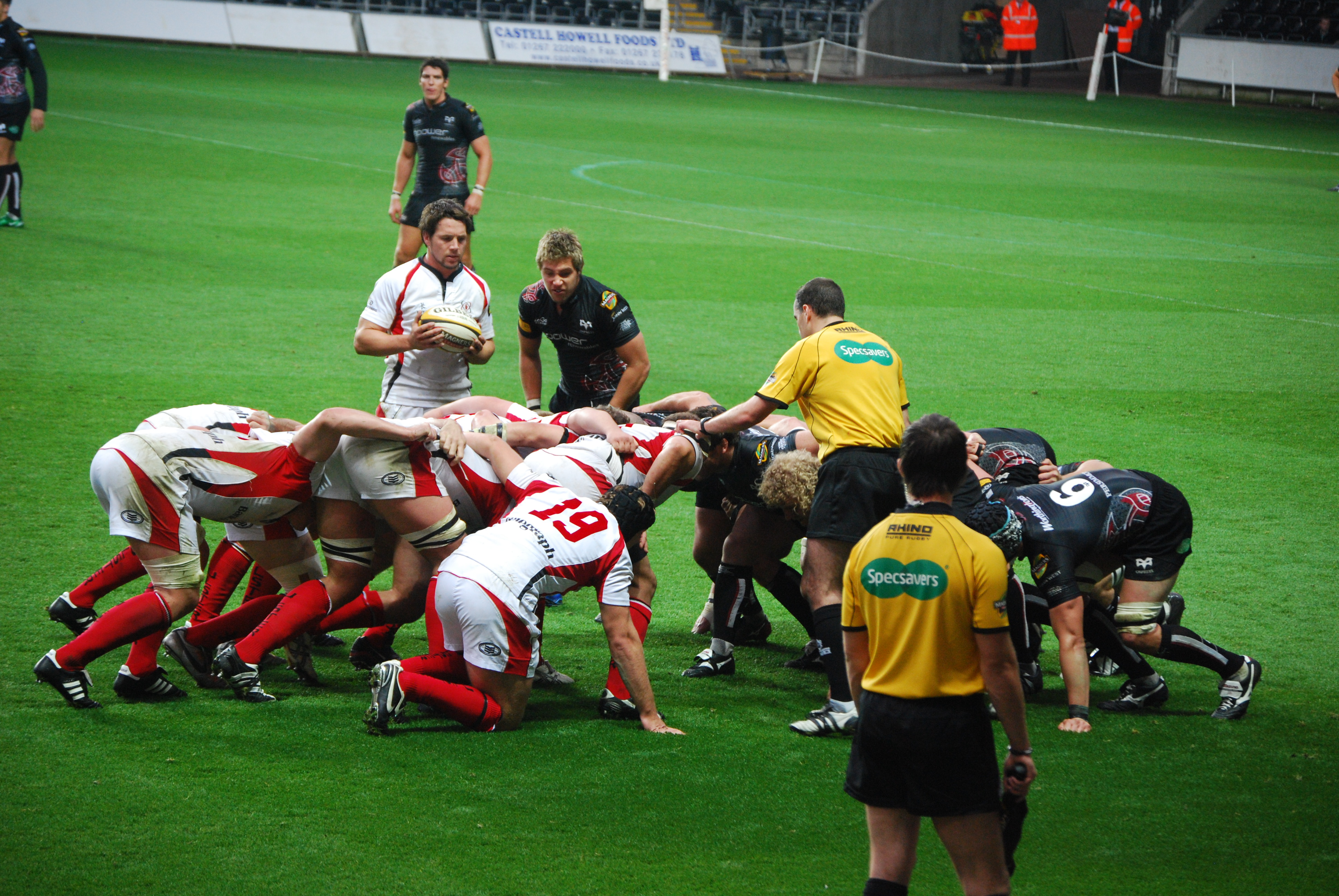
Opreys v Ulster in 2008

The team began the 2007-08 season with a poor run of results, and Mark McCall resigned in November following Ulster's embarrassing 32–14 home defeat to Gloucester in the opening round of the 2007–08 Heineken Cup. Assistant coach Steve Williams took temporary charge, and Matt Williams took charge in February, but failed to turn the season around, with Ulster finishing 9th in the 10 team Celtic League. Centre Darren Cave made his debut from the academy. At the end of the season wing Tommy Bowe, who was named Player of the Year, left for Ospreys. Roger Wilson went to Northampton Saints. Out-half David Humphreys retired, and was appointed the province's Director of Operations.

The following season out-half Ian Humphreys, David's younger brother, was signed from Leicester Tigers. Ulster finished third in their Heineken Cup group and eighth in the Celtic League, and Williams resigned. Hooker Rory Best was Player of the Year.

For the 2009-10 season a new management structure was put in place, with David Humphreys as director of rugby and Brian McLaughlin as head coach, assisted by Jeremy Davidson and Neil Doak. New signings included lock Dan Tuohy from Exeter. Centre Nevin Spence made his debut from the academy. The season saw an improvement in Ulster's Heineken Cup form, including their first away win in England against Bath, but they finished eighth in the Celtic League. Flanker Chris Henry was Player of the Year. At the end of the season, scrum-half Isaac Boss left for Leinster, and prop Justin Fitzpatrick retired.

=== Revival (2010–2014) ===
The 2010-11 season saw significant improvement. Ulster signed key players including 2007 Rugby World Cup winning Springboks Ruan Pienaar and Johann Muller. Out-half Paddy Jackson. and centre Luke Marshall made their debuts from the academy. Ulster made the semi-finals of the Celtic League and the quarter-finals of the Heineken Cup. Ruan Pienaar was Player of the Year.

New signings for the 2011-12 season included prop John Afoa and utility back Jared Payne. Academy lock Iain Henderson made his senior debut. Ulster reached the Heineken Cup final, losing to Leinster at Twickenham. The Celtic League had been renamed the Pro12 after the addition of two Italian teams, and Ulster finished sixth. Brian McLaughlin was replaced as head coach by Mark Anscombe. Flanker Chris Henry was Player of the Year.

New signings for the 2012–13 season included back row forward Nick Williams from the now defunct Aironi, wing Tommy Bowe, returning from his four-year stay at the Ospreys, back row forward Roger Wilson, returning from Northampton Saints, and Irish-qualified South African hooker Rob Herring, initially on a six-month trial. Out-half Ian Humphreys left for London Irish. Centre Nevin Spence died in an accident at the family farm. Ulster started the season with 13 consecutive wins in all competitions, the longest unbeaten run in their history. They finished top of their group in the Heineken Cup, qualifying for the quarter-finals, where they lost to Northampton Saints. They finished top of the table in the Pro12, earning a home semi-final, in which they defeated Scarlets 27–16 in the last match before the old grandstand was demolished. The redevelopment of Ravenhill meant the final against Leinster had to be played at the RDS Arena in Dublin. Leinster won 24–18. Lock Alan O'Connor made his debut from the academy this season. Wing Andrew Trimble was Player of the Year.

The 2013–14 season proved trophyless again. For the first time, Ulster won all their Heineken Cup group games, with away victories against Montpellier and Leicester Tigers being the highlight. They were knocked out at the quarterfinal stage with a 17–15 home defeat to Saracens. The Pro12 season was racked with inconsistency and Ulster finished the league season in fourth place. This set up an away semi-final with Leinster, and for the fourth time in four seasons the season was ended by their old foes with a 13–9 defeat. Centre Stuart McCloskey and prop Andrew Warwick made their debuts from the academy. Andrew Trimble was Player of the Year for the second year running. The season ended with the retirements of captain Johann Muller, centre Paddy Wallace, and flanker Stephen Ferris. Director of Rugby David Humphreys also left the province to take up a similar position at Gloucester Rugby. Following Humphreys' departure, Mark Anscombe was sacked by the province and was replaced by Ireland defence coach Les Kiss on an interim basis.

=== 2014–17 – the Les Kiss years ===
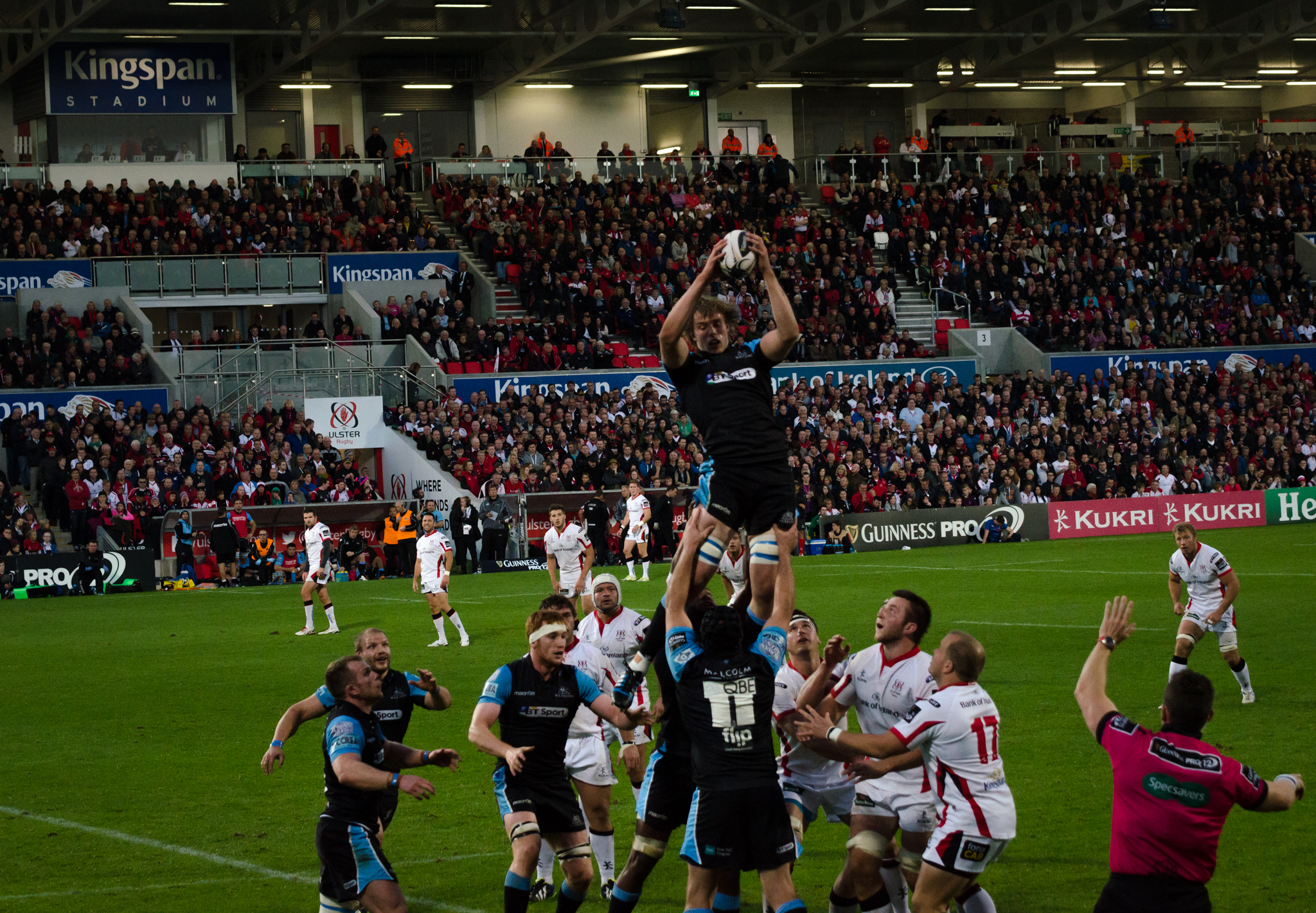
Ulster v Glasgow match, October 2014

The 2014–15 season was Ulster's first under director of rugby Les Kiss and head coach Neil Doak. The redeveloped Ravenhill, renamed the Kingspan Stadium, now had a capacity of 18,196. Rory Best was named captain after the retirement of Johann Muller. New signings included out-half Ian Humphreys, returning from London Irish, lock Franco van der Merwe from the Lions, outside back Louis Ludik from Agen, and flanker Sean Reidy from Counties Manukau. Ulster were knocked out of the new European Champions Cup at the group stage. They finished fourth in the Pro12 but narrowly lost in the playoff semifinal to eventual champions Glasgow Warriors. Prop Declan Fitzpatrick retired at the end of the season. Wing Craig Gilroy was named Player of the Year.

In 2015–16, Ulster were knocked out of the Champions Cup at the group stage despite a memorable back to back win over Toulouse. They finished fourth in the Pro12 but reached the semi-finals, losing to Leinster. Wing Jacob Stockdale made his debut from the academy. Centre Stuart McCloskey was Player of the Year.

Before the 2016–17 season, Nick Williams left for Cardiff Blues and Dan Tuohy for Bristol Bears, and Ian Humphreys retired. Ulster signed back row forward Marcell Coetzee, fullback Charles Piutau and lock Kieran Treadwell. Academy flanker Nick Timoney made his debut. Ulster finished the season bottom of their pool in the Heineken Cup, and fifth in the Pro12. Charles Piutau was Player of the Year.

=== 2017–18 - the "basket case" season ===
For the 2017–18 season, the Pro12 became the Pro14 with the addition of two South African teams. Head coach Neil Doak's contract was not renewed and he was replaced by Jono Gibbes. Assistant coach Allen Clarke also left, replaced by Dwayne Peel. All-time appearance holder Roger Wilson retired, and scrum-half Ruan Pienaar was blocked by the IRFU from extending his contract. John Cooney was signed from Connacht to replace him.

Before the season started, out-half Paddy Jackson and centre Stuart Olding were charged with rape and suspended from playing pending trial. Both would be acquitted, but have their contracts revoked. Australian out-half Christian Lealiifano was signed on loan. Prop Tom O'Toole made his debut from the academy. After a poor run of form over the Christmas period, Les Kiss resigned as Director of Rugby, and Gibbes cut his contract short, leaving at the end of the season. Ulster finished third in their Champions Cup pool, and fourth in Conference B of the Pro14, failing to qualify for the playoffs and needing to win a playoff to qualify for the next season's Champions Cup. Former Ireland captain Brian O'Driscoll described the province as "a bit of a basket case", facing "Administration issues, senior players retiring, the well documented court case, now no number 10 to build the team around, no coach next year, struggling for Champions Cup rugby next season." Scrum-half John Cooney was named Player of the Year.

=== 2018–24: the Dan McFarland years ===
For the 2018–19 season Dan McFarland was brought in as the new head coach. Jared Payne, Tommy Bowe, Andrew Trimble and Chris Henry all retired, and Charles Piutau left for Bristol Bears. Out-half Billy Burns was signed from Gloucester, prop Marty Moore from Wasps, flanker Jordi Murphy from Leinster, and utility back Will Addison from Sale Sharks. Prop Eric O'Sullivan, wing Robert Baloucoune, centre James Hume, fullback Michael Lowry and flanker Marcus Rea all made their debuts from the academy. Ulster finished the season as quarter-finalists in the Champions Cup, and semi-finalists in the Pro14, losing to Glasgow Warriors. Rory Best and Darren Cave retired at the end of the season. Centre Stuart McCloskey was Player of the Year for the second time.

Lock Iain Henderson was named captain for the 2019–20 season. Ulster were again quarter-finalists in the Champions Cup, going out to Toulouse, and reached the final of the Pro14, losing to Leinster. Centre Stewart Moore and wing Ethan McIlroy made their debuts from the academy, and scrum-half John Cooney was Player of the Year for the second time.

The 2020–21 season was shortened by the COVID-19 pandemic, and games were played behind closed doors. Ulster finished second in Conference A of the Pro14, but failed to make the knockout stages of the Champions Cup and were entered into the Challenge Cup. They progressed to the semi-finals, where they were beaten by Leicester Tigers. The season's final competition was the Pro14 Rainbow Cup, pitting the Pro14's European teams against the four South African teams who were leaving Super Rugby. Ulster's form in this competition was poor, and they finished tenth in the European pool. Marcell Coetzee cut short his contract and left for the Bulls before the end of the season. Academy players Cormac Izuchukwu, Nathan Doak, David McCann, Callum Reid and Aaron Sexton all made their senior debuts this season. Lock Alan O'Connor was Player of the Year.

In 2021–22 the Pro14 became the United Rugby Championship, with the addition of four new South African teams. Ulster made the semi-finals, where they narrowly lost to the Stormers in Cape Town. In the Champions Cup, they made the knockout stage, but went out in a two-legged round of sixteen playoff against Toulouse by an aggregate score of 50–49. Centre James Hume was Player of the Year.

New signings for the 2022-23 season included prop Jeffery Toomaga-Allen. Lock Harry Sheridan and centre Jude Postlethwaite made their senior debuts. Despite a poor run of results in mid-season, Ulster made the knockout stage of the Champions Cup, going out in the round of 16 to Leinster. They became the first European team in the URC to win all four league games against South African opposition, and secured a home quarter-final with a home win over the Bulls in March, which they lost to Connacht. Hooker Tom Stewart was named Player of the Year after scoring 16 tries in the URC, a league record, and 17 tries in all competitions, an Ulster record.

New signings for the 2023–24 season included prop Steven Kitshoff and flanker Dave Ewers. After a difficult first half of the season, McFarland left his position, to be replaced by assistant coach Dan Soper until after the Six Nations Under 20s Championship, after which Ireland under-20 coach Richie Murphy would take over until the end of the season. Chief Executive Jonny Petrie left not long after, replaced on an interim basis by Hugh McCaughey. Murphy signed a two-year contract in May. Ulster finished sixth in the URC, going out in the quarter-finals to Leinster, and went out of the Champions Cup at the pool stage, dropping into the Challenge Cup where they made the quarter-finals. Flanker David McCann was Player of the Season. Prop Scott Wilson made his debut from the academy.

=== 2024 to present ===
Before the 2024–25 season, Richie Murphy's first full season in charge, there were significant changes. Out-half Billy Burns left for Munster; prop Steven Kitshoff returned to the Stormers, where he was joined by flanker Dave Ewers; utility back Will Addison signed for Sale Sharks; and centre Luke Marshall retired. New signings included wing Werner Kok from the Sharks and Irish-qualified out-half Aidan Morgan from the Hurricanes. Ireland Sevens player of the year Zac Ward, son of former Ulster captain Andy Ward, joined Ulster on a trial basis. Jimmy Duffy replaced Roddy Grant as forwards coach, Sam Dodge joined as head of athletic performance, and skills coach Craig Newby left for Ealing Trailfinders. Ulster qualified for the round of 16 in the Champions Cup, going out to Bordeaux, and finished 14th in the URC, failing to qualify for the playoffs or for next season's Champions Cup, being entered into the EPCR Challenge Cup. Nick Timoney was player of the year.

There were further changes for the 2025–26 season. Following the end of Kingspan's sponsorship deal, Ulster's new shirt sponsor was SAM Mouldings, and Ravenhill was renamed the Affidea Stadium. Willie Faloon replaced Jonny Bell as defence coach, Mark Sexton was appointed backs and attack coach, and Dan Soper moved to a new player development role. Bryn Cunningham resigned as general manager, and was replaced by Rory Best. Scrum-half John Cooney left for Brive, lock Kieran Treadwell for Harlequins, and prop Andrew Warwick and lock Alan O'Connor, among others, were released. South African number eight Juarno Augustus joined from Northampton Saints, and Australian international prop Angus Bell was signed on sabbatical from the Waratahs, to join the province in December. Ulster concluded the 25/26 season finishing 9th in the URC, missing out on the playoffs and qualification for the European Rugby Champions Cup. They did however reach the 2025–26 European Challenge Cup final, losing to a dominant Montpellier who ran out 59–26 winners in Bilbao. Stuart McCloskey was Ulster's player of the year, and Rugby Players Ireland's men's player of the year. Back row Bryn Ward made his debut from the academy, received the Rugby Players Ireland young player of the year award, and made his debut for Ireland in July.

Before the 2026-27 season, forwards coach Jimmy Duffy left for Munster, and was replaced by New Zealander Clarke Dermody, formerly of the Highlanders. Angus Bell returned to the Waratahs at the end of his sabbatical, and Werner Kok joined Newcastle Red Bulls. New signings included lock Eli Snyman, props Eduardo Bello and Keynan Knox, out-half Jamie Benson and scrum-half Matthew Devine.

== Previous season summaries ==
	Domestic League				European Cup		Domestic / 'A' Cup	
Season	Competition	Final Position (Pool)	Points	Play-offs	Competition	Performance	Competition	Performance
1995–96	No competition				Heineken Cup	4th in pool	Interprovincial Championship	2nd
1996–97	No competition				Heineken Cup	4th in pool	Interprovincial Championship	3rd
1997–98	No competition				Heineken Cup	4th in pool	Interprovincial Championship	3rd
1998–99	No competition				Heineken Cup	Champions	Interprovincial Championship	2nd
1999–00	No competition				Heineken Cup	4th in pool	Interprovincial Championship	2nd
2000–01	No competition				Heineken Cup	4th in pool	Interprovincial Championship	2nd
2001–02	Celtic League	2nd (A)	13	Semi-final	Heineken Cup	2nd in pool	Interprovincial Championship	2nd
2002–03	Celtic League	3rd (A)	22	Semi-final	Heineken Cup	3rd in pool	No competition	
2003–04	Celtic League	2nd	72	N/A	Heineken Cup	3rd in pool	Celtic Cup	Champions
2004–05	Celtic League	8th	43	N/A	Heineken Cup	3rd in pool	Celtic Cup	Quarter-final
2005–06	Celtic League	Champions	75	N/A	Heineken Cup	3rd in pool	No competition	
2006–07	Magners League	5th	55	N/A	Heineken Cup	3rd in pool	No competition	
2007–08	Magners League	9th	29	N/A	Heineken Cup	4th in pool	No competition	
2008–09	Magners League	8th	36	N/A	Heineken Cup	3rd in pool	No competition	
2009–10	Magners League	8th	36	Did not qualify	Heineken Cup	2nd in pool	British and Irish Cup	Semi-final
2010–11	Magners League	3rd	67	Semi-final	Heineken Cup	Quarter-final	British and Irish Cup	5th in pool
2011–12	RaboDirect PRO12	6th	56	Did not qualify	Heineken Cup	Runner-up	British and Irish Cup	Quarter-final
2012–13	RaboDirect PRO12	1st	81	Runner-up	Heineken Cup	Quarter-final	British and Irish Cup	2nd in pool
2013–14	RaboDirect PRO12	4th	70	Semi-final	Heineken Cup	Quarter-final	British and Irish Cup	2nd in pool
2014–15	Guinness PRO12	4th	69	Semi-final	Champions Cup	3rd in pool	British and Irish Cup	3rd in pool
2015–16	Guinness PRO12	4th	69	Semi-final	Champions Cup	2nd in pool	British and Irish Cup	3rd in pool
2016–17	Guinness PRO12	5th	68	Did not qualify	Champions Cup	4th in pool	British and Irish Cup	Quarter-final
2017–18	Guinness PRO14	4th (B)	62	Did not qualify	Champions Cup	3rd in pool	British and Irish Cup	Quarter-final
2018–19	Guinness PRO14	2nd (B)	63	Semi-final	Champions Cup	Quarter-final	Celtic Cup	3rd in pool
2019–20	Guinness PRO14	2nd (A)	44	Runner-up	Champions Cup	Quarter-final	Celtic Cup	Runner-up
2020–21	Guinness PRO14	2nd (A)	64	Did not qualify	Challenge Cup*	Semi-final	Rainbow Cup	10th in pool
2021–22	United Rugby Championship	3rd	59	Semi-final	Champions Cup	Round of 16	URC Shield	2nd in pool
2022–23	United Rugby Championship	2nd	68	Quarter-final	Champions Cup	Round of 16	URC Shield	2nd in pool
2023–24	United Rugby Championship	6th	54	Quarter-final	Challenge Cup*	Quarter-final	URC Shield	2nd in pool
2024–25	United Rugby Championship	14th	38	Did not qualify	Champions Cup	Round of 16	URC Shield	3rd in pool

Gold background denotes champions
Silver background denotes runner-up

* After dropping into the competition from the Champions Cup/Heineken Cup

== Current standings ==
=== United Rugby Championship ===
Pos	Team	Pld	W	D	L	PF	PA	PD	TF	TA	TB	LB	Pts	Qualification
1	Glasgow Warriors	5	4	1	0	148	112	+36	22	15	5	0	23	Qualification for the Champions Cup and knockout stage
2	Bulls	5	4	0	1	214	106	+108	31	15	4	1	21	Qualification for the Champions Cup and knockout stage
3	Stormers	5	4	0	1	166	101	+65	24	14	4	1	21	Qualification for the Champions Cup and knockout stage
4	Sharks	5	4	0	1	140	107	+33	20	16	3	0	19	Qualification for the Champions Cup and knockout stage
5	Edinburgh	5	4	0	1	123	95	+28	17	12	3	0	19	Qualification for the Champions Cup and knockout stage
6	Leinster	5	3	0	2	149	81	+68	23	11	4	2	18	Qualification for the Champions Cup and knockout stage
7	Cardiff	5	3	0	2	113	107	+6	17	17	2	0	14	Qualification for the Champions Cup and knockout stage
8	Dragons	5	2	1	2	137	128	+9	20	20	3	1	14	Qualification for the Champions Cup and knockout stage
9	Ospreys	5	2	0	3	112	147	−35	18	21	3	0	11	Qualification for the Challenge Cup
10	Benetton	5	1	1	3	115	104	+11	16	17	2	3	11	Qualification for the Challenge Cup
11	Connacht	5	2	0	3	109	161	−52	18	24	2	0	10	Qualification for the Challenge Cup
12	Munster	5	1	1	3	93	113	−20	12	17	2	2	10	Qualification for the Challenge Cup
13	Lions	5	2	0	3	107	162	−55	15	25	1	0	9	Qualification for the Challenge Cup
14	Scarlets	5	1	0	4	134	191	−57	20	29	4	1	9	Qualification for the Challenge Cup
15	Ulster	5	0	2	3	121	160	−39	18	22	4	1	9	Qualification for the Challenge Cup
16	Zebre	5	0	0	5	93	199	−106	14	30	2	0	2	Qualification for the Challenge Cup

Updated to match(es) played on 2nd November 2026. Source: UnitedRugby.com
Rules for classification: Tiebreakers for teams tied on points: 1) Number of matches won 2) The difference between points for and points against 3) The number of tries scored 4) The most points scored 5) The difference between tries for and tries against 6) The fewest red cards received 7) The fewest yellow cards received.

=== EPCR Challenge Cup ===
Pool 1

EPCR Challenge Cup Pool 1
Pos	Team	Pld	W	D	L	PF	PA	PD	TF	TA	TB	LB	Pts	Qualification
1	(Ireland) Ulster	1	1	0	0	40	21	+19	6	3	1	0	5	Home round of 16
2	(Wales) Dragons	1	1	0	0	29	14	+15	4	2	0	0	4	Home round of 16
3	(France) Bayonne	1	1	0	0	29	27	+2	5	3	0	0	4	Home round of 16
4	(South Africa) Cheetahs	1	0	0	1	27	29	−2	3	5	0	1	1	Away round of 16
5	(France) Perpignan	1	0	0	1	14	29	−15	2	4	0	0	0	
6	(Italy) Zebre Parma	1	0	0	1	21	40	−19	3	6	0	0	0	

First match(es) will be played: 16 October 2026. Source: EPCR
Rules for classification: Tiebreakers for teams tied on points: 1) Number of matches won; 2) Difference between points for and against; 3) Total number of points for; 4) Aggregate number of points scored in matches between tied teams; 5) Number of matches won excluding the first match, then the second and so on until the tie is settled.

== Honours ==
- European Rugby Champions Cup
  - Winners: 1 (1998–99)
  - Runners Up: 1 (2011–12)
- European Rugby Challenge Cup
  - Runners-up (1): 2026
- United Rugby Championship
  - Winners: 1 (2005–06)
  - Runners Up: 3 (2003-04, 2012-13, 2019-20)
- United Rugby Championship Irish Shield
  - Runners Up: 3 (2021-22, 2022-23, 2023-24)
- Celtic Cup
  - Winners: 1 (2003–04)
- Irish Inter-Provincial Championships
  - Winners: 26 (8 shared) (1946–47, 1950–51, 1951–52, 1953–54, 1955–56 (shared), 1956–57 (shared), 1966–67 (shared), 1967–68, 1969–70, 1970–71, 1972–73, 1974–75, 1975–76 (shared), 1976–77, 1977–78 (shared), 1982–83 (shared), 1984–85, 1985–86, 1986–87, 1987–88 (shared), 1988–89, 1989–90, 1990–91, 1991–92, 1992–93, 1993–94 (shared)
- Glasgow City Sevens
  - Winners: 1 (2013–14)

== Crest ==
The flag of the province of Ulster

The current crest was introduced in 2003. The new, stylised crest is made specific to Ulster Rugby as it incorporates the red hand from the provincial flag of Ulster with two rugby balls. The Ulster Rugby crest is on all official club merchandise including replica jerseys.

== Stadium ==
Ravenhill Stadium

The Ravenhill Stadium, known for sponsorship reasons as the Affidea Stadium from 2025, and the Kingspan Stadium from 2014 to 2025, opened in 1923. It has hosted two Rugby World Cup matches, several Ireland national team matches, the 2015 Pro12 Grand Final and many 2017 Women's Rugby World Cup matches, including the final.

The Premium Stand opened in 2009. In 2011, the Northern Ireland Executive announced that it had granted £138m for various stadium redevelopment projects throughout Northern Ireland. Ulster Rugby received £14.5m, which was used to redevelop Ravenhill and expand its capacity from 12,000 to 18,000. The rest of the redevelopment took place from 2012 to 2014. In 2012, Ulster Rugby confirmed that three new stands would be built at Ravenhill, with work commencing in late 2012. Two new stands at the Memorial and Aquinas ends of the stadium were completed while the main stand was demolished and rebuilt. The major refurbishment was completed in April 2014. After the rest of the redevelopment was completed, the stadium was renamed the Kingspan Stadium. in 2025, the stadium took on a new naming sponsor, becoming the Affidea Stadium.

=== Home attendance ===
Domestic League					European Cup					Total	
League	Fixtures	Average Attendance	Highest	Lowest	League	Fixtures	Average Attendance	Highest	Lowest	Total Attendance	Average Attendance
–	–	–	–	–	1995–96 Heineken Cup	1	2,500	2,500	2,500	2,500	2,500
–	–	–	–	–	1996–97 Heineken Cup	2	5,750	8,000	3,500	11,500	5,750
–	–	–	–	–	1997–98 Heineken Cup	3	2,617	3,250	2,100	7,850	2,617
–	–	–	–	–	1998–99 Heineken Cup	5	11,000	20,000	4,500	55,000	11,000
–	–	–	–	–	1999–00 Heineken Cup	3	8,667	12,000	6,000	26,000	8,667
–	–	–	–	–	2000–01 Heineken Cup	3	12,500	13,500	12,000	37,500	12,500
2001–02 Celtic League	4	8,500	12,000	6,000	2001–02 Heineken Cup	3	11,833	13,000	10,000	69,500	9,929
2002–03 Celtic League	4	8,375	10,500	6,000	2002–03 Heineken Cup	3	11,717	12,500	11,000	68,650	9,807
2003–04 Celtic League	12•	6,863	12,000	5,041	2003–04 Heineken Cup	3	11,489	12,300	10,243	116,819	7,788
2004–05 Celtic League	10	6,693	8,145	5,638	2004–05 Heineken Cup	3	9,452	11,435	7,320	95,283	7,330
2005–06 Celtic League	10	9,181	12,300	6,487	2005–06 Heineken Cup	3	12,284	12,300	12,252	128,665	9,897
2006–07 Celtic League	10	10,207	12,900	7,429	2006–07 Heineken Cup	3	12,599	12,772	12,278	139,862	10,759
2007–08 Celtic League	9	9,661	13,132	6,592	2007–08 Heineken Cup	3	10,335	13,000	8,340	117,956	9,830
2008–09 Celtic League	9	9,085	13,500	7,368	2008–09 Heineken Cup	3	9,329	10,397	8,729	109,752	9,146
2009–10 Celtic League	9	8,863	11,800	7,334	2009–10 Heineken Cup	3	10,509	11,000	8,262	109,947	9,162
2010–11 Celtic League	11	8,476	11,426	6,651	2010–11 Heineken Cup	3	8,863	10,566	7,777	119,829	8,559
2011–12 Pro12	11	8,258	11,379	6,296	2011–12 Heineken Cup	3	9,593	11,900	7,494	119,620	8,544
2012–13 Pro12	12	10,373	11,078	8,108	2012–13 Heineken Cup	3	11,123	11,451	10,940	157,840	10,523
2013–14 Pro12	11	13,348	16,950	10,693	2013–14 Heineken Cup	4	14,464	16,853	12,977	204,678	13,645
2014–15 Pro12	11	16,037	17,139	13,501	2014–15 European Rugby Champions Cup	3	16,179	16,931	15,659	224,946	16,068
2015–16 Pro12	11	15,310	17,332	12,640	2015–16 European Rugby Champions Cup	3	16,111	17,108	15,108	216,740	15,481
2016–17 Pro12	11	15,961	17,676	13,663	2016–17 European Rugby Champions Cup	3	16,028	16,843	14,924	223,658	15,976
2017–18 Pro14	12*	14,026	17,631	7,014	2017–18 European Rugby Champions Cup	3	15,314	15,646	15,004	214,247	14,283
2018–19 Pro14	11	13,835	17,358	11,882	2018–19 European Rugby Champions Cup	3	14,039	16,842	12,124	194,300	13,879
2019–20 Pro14	7‡	13,818	17,483	10,975	2019–20 European Rugby Champions Cup	3	17,024	17,923	15,466	147,796	14,780
2020–21 Pro14; Pro14 Rainbow Cup	0‡	–	–	–	2020–21 European Rugby Champions Cup	0‡	–	–	–	–	–
2021–22 United Rugby Championship	10	11,696	16,274	9,542	2021–22 European Rugby Champions Cup	3	14,969	18,196	12,000	161,869	12,452
2022–23 United Rugby Championship	10	13,413	16,741	10,858	2022–23 European Rugby Champions Cup	1	18,196	18,196	18,196	152,330	13,848
2023–24 United Rugby Championship	8†	13,679	18,196	10,181	2023–24 European Rugby Champions Cup	2	14,437	16,592	12,282	138,305	13,831
2024–25 United Rugby Championship	9	13,176	16,491	11,533	2024–25 European Rugby Champions Cup	2	12,335	13,093	11,576	143,251	13,023
2025–26 United Rugby Championship	9	12,606	18,196	9,563	2025–26 EPCR Challenge Cup	5	9,696	11,900	7,169	161,930	11,566
•Match figures inclusive of both Celtic League and Celtic Cup fixtures.
*Match figures inclusive of both Pro14 League fixtures and a European Champions Cup playoff fixture.
‡Match figures include fixtures in which COVID-19 restrictions limited attendance, but exclude fixtures in which no spectators were allowed due to the COVID-19 pandemic.
†Only matches in which there was a reported attendance are included.

Up to date as of the 2024–25 season.

Key
	Record high
	Record low
*	Affected by the COVID-19 pandemic

== Current squads ==
=== Ulster Men coaches and management ===
Position	Name	Nationality
Chief executive officer	Hugh McCaughey	Ireland
General manager	Rory Best	Ireland
Head coach	Richie Murphy	Ireland
Forwards coach	Clarke Dermody	New Zealand
Backs coach	Mark Sexton	Ireland
Defence and contact skills coach	Willie Faloon	Ireland
Development and transition coach	Dan Soper	New Zealand
Coach development advisor	Joe Schmidt	New Zealand
Head of athletic performance	Matt Ireton	England
Academy manager	Gavin Hogg	Ireland
Elite performance development officer	Niall Annett	Ireland
Elite performance development officer	Jonathon Graham	Ireland

=== Ulster Men squad ===
2026–27 Ulster squad
**Props**: (Argentina) **Eduardo Bello**; (Ireland) Sam Crean; (South Africa) Keynan Knox *; (Ireland) **Eric O'Sullivan**; (Ireland) **Tom O'Toole**; (Ireland) Callum Reid; (Ireland) Scott Wilson; **Hookers**: (Ireland) **Rob Herring**; (Ireland) James McCormick; (Ireland) **Tom Stewart**; (England) Henry Walker *; **Locks**: (Ireland) **Iain Henderson** **(c)**; (Ireland) Joe Hopes; (Ireland) Charlie Irvine; (Ireland) **Cormac Izuchukwu**; (Ireland) Harry Sheridan; (Zimbabwe) Eli Snyman	**Back row**: (South Africa) Juarno Augustus; (England) Ben Donnell *; (Ireland) David McCann; (Ireland) **James McNabney**; (Ireland) Martin Moloney; (Ireland) **Nick Timoney**; (Ireland) **Bryn Ward**; **Scrum-halves**: (Ireland) Matthew Devine; (Ireland) **Nathan Doak**; (Ireland) Conor McKee; **Fly-halves**: (England) Jamie Benson *; (Ireland) Jake Flannery; (Ireland) Jack Murphy	**Centres**: (Ireland) Ben Carson; (Ireland) Daniel Hawkshaw; (Ireland) **James Hume**; (Ireland) **Stuart McCloskey**; (Ireland) Stewart Moore; (Ireland) Jude Postlethwaite; **Wings**: (Ireland) Aitzol Arenzana-King; (Ireland) **Robert Baloucoune**; (Ireland) Chay Mullins; (Ireland) **Jacob Stockdale**; (Ireland) Zac Ward; **Fullbacks**: (Ireland) **Michael Lowry**; (Ireland) Ethan McIlroy
**(c)** denotes the team captain. **Bold** denotes internationally capped players. * denotes players qualified to play for Ireland on residency or dual nationality. Taking into account signings and departures ahead of 2026–27 season as listed on List of 2026–27 United Rugby Championship transfers.

=== Ulster Men academy squad ===
2026–27 Ulster Men Academy squad (19 members with Year stages)
**Props**: (Ireland) Tyrese Abolarin (1); (Ireland) Jacob Boyd (4); (Ireland) Flynn Longstaff (2); (Ireland) Tom McAllister (2); (Ireland) Blake McLean (1); **Hookers**: (Ireland) Conor Magee (2); **Locks**: (Ireland) Mahon Ronan (2); (Australia) Paddy Woods * (1)	**Back row**: (Ireland) Tom Brigg (4); (Ireland) James McKillop (3); **Scrum-halves**: (Ireland) Clark Logan (3); (Ireland) Connor McVicker (1); **Fly-halves**: (Ireland) Daniel Green (2); (Ireland) Charlie O'Connor (1)	**Centres**: (Ireland) Tom Bell (1); (South Africa) Rynard Gordon * (1); (Ireland) Jonny Scott (3); **Wings**: (England) Jed Findlay * (1); (Ireland) Josh Gibson (2)
**(c)** denotes the team captain. **Bold** denotes internationally capped players. * denotes players qualified to play for Ireland on residency or dual nationality. Taking into account signings and departures ahead of 2026–27 season as listed on List of 2026–27 United Rugby Championship transfers.

=== Ulster Women coaches and management ===
Position	Name	Nationality
Head coach	Murray Houston	Scotland
Lineout coach	Reuben Crothers	Ireland
Scrum and defence coach	Griffin Phillipson	Ireland
Backs coach	Grace Davitt	Ireland
Skills coach	James Hume	Ireland
Athletic development coach	Kevin Gallagher	Ireland
Team manager	Marianne Breen	Ireland
Physio	Martin Dunlop	Ireland

=== Ulster Women squad ===
Ulster Senior Women's Squad 35 Players
**Props**: (Ireland) Sophie Barrett; (Ireland) Bronach Cassidy; (Ireland) Ava Fannin; (Ireland) **Sadhbh McGrath**; (Ireland) Sarah Roberts; (Ireland) Grace Simati; **Hookers**: (Ireland) Maebh Clenaghan; (Ireland) India Daley (c); (Ireland) Emily Whittle; **Locks**: (Ireland) Rebecca Beacom; (Ireland) Olivia McKinley; (Ireland) Ellen Patterson; (Ireland) **Fiona Tuite**	**Back row**: (Ireland) **Claire Boles** (vc); (Ireland) Jemima Johnson; (Ireland) Katie Hetherington; (Ireland) Christy Hill; (Ireland) Moya Hill; (Ireland) Cara McClean; (Ireland) Stacey Sloan; (Ireland) Ruby Starrett; **Scrum-halves**: (Ireland) Georgia Boyce; (Ireland) Amy McConkey; (Ireland) Rachael McIlroy; (Ireland) Sophie Meeke; **Out-halves**: (Ireland) Ella Durkan; (Ireland) Abby Moyles (vc)	**Centres**: (Ireland) Caitlin Crowe; (Ireland) Leah Irwin; (Ireland) Lucy Thompson; **Wings**: (Ireland) Ciara Fitzsimons; (Ireland) Katie Gilmour; (Ireland) Rebecca Mann; **Utility backs**: (Ireland) Niamh Marley; (Ireland) Siobhan Sheerin
(c) denotes the team captain, (vc) denotes the team vice-captain. **Bold** denotes internationally capped players.

== Results versus national teams ==
Scores and results list Ulster's points tally first.

Date	Opponent	Location	Result	Score	Notes
13 December 1902	Canada	Belfast	Lost	8–11	Match Report
December 1912	South Africa	Belfast	Lost	0–19	Match Report
5 November 1924	New Zealand	Ravenhill, Belfast	Lost	6–28	Tour Article
December 1931	South Africa	Ravenhill, Belfast	Lost	3–30	Match Report
30 November 1935	New Zealand	Ravenhill, Belfast	Draw	3–3	Match Report
29 November 1947	Australia	Ravenhill, Belfast	lost	10–14	Match report
1 December 1951	South Africa	Ravenhill, Belfast	Lost	5–27	Match Report
2 January 1954	New Zealand	Ravenhill, Belfast	Draw	5–5	Match Report
30 November 1957	Australia	Ravenhill, Belfast	Lost	0–9	Match Report
28 January 1961	South Africa	Belfast	Lost	6–19	Match Report
25 January 1964	New Zealand	Ravenhill, Belfast	Lost	5–24	Match Report
29 November 1969	South Africa	Ravenhill, Belfast	Draw	0–0*	Tour Article
18 November 1972	New Zealand	Ravenhill, Belfast	Lost	6–19	Match Report
3 November 1973	Argentina XV	Ravenhill, Belfast	Won	23–13	Match Report
16 November 1974	New Zealand	Ravenhill, Belfast	Lost	15–30	Match Report
15 November 1975	Australia	Ravenhill, Belfast	Lost	25–30	Match Report
7 November 1978	New Zealand	Ravenhill, Belfast	Lost	7–23	Match Report
11 October 1980	Romania	Ravenhill, Belfast	Lost	13–15	Match Report
14 November 1981	Australia	Ravenhill, Belfast	Lost	6–12	Tour article
14 November 1984	Australia	Ravenhill, Belfast	Won	15–13	Match Report
23 October 1985	Fiji	Ravenhill, Belfast	Won	23–9	Match Report
13 September 1986	Canada	Ravenhill, Belfast	Won	32–13	Match Report
22 August 1987	Zimbabwe	Bulawayo	Won	36–12	Match Report
29 August 1987	Zimbabwe	Harare	Lost	17–18	Match report
2 November 1988	Western Samoa	Ravenhill, Belfast	Won	47–15	Match Report
21 November 1989	New Zealand	Ravenhill, Belfast	Lost	3–21	Match Report
4 September 1990	Spain	Ravenhill, Belfast	Won	28–13	Match Report
24 October 1992	Australia	Ravenhill, Belfast	Lost	11–35	Match Report
16 November 1996	Australia	Ravenhill, Belfast	Lost	26–39	Match Report
10 August 1998	Morocco	Ravenhill, Belfast	Won	50–5	Match Report
10 November 2008	Portugal	Ravenhill, Belfast	Won	62–6	Match Report
9 November 2018	Uruguay	Ravenhill, Belfast	Won	21–5	Match Report
*Match was cancelled by the Northern Irish government due to concerns that law and order could not be maintained with anti-apartheid demonstrations expected to take place.

== Records against URC and European Cup opponents ==
Against	Played	Won	Drawn	Lost	% Won
(Italy) Aironi	8	8	0	0	100.00%
(France) ASM Clermont Auvergne	9	5	0	4	55.56%
(England) Bath	7	6	0	1	85.71%
(Italy) Benetton†	31	25	3	3	80.65%
(France) Biarritz	6	2	0	4	33.33%
(France) Bordeaux	5	0	0	5	00.00%
(Scotland) Border Reivers	8	8	0	0	100.00%
(France) Bourgoin	4	1	0	3	25.00%
(Wales) Bridgend	1	1	0	0	100.00%
(South Africa) Bulls	6	3	0	3	44%
(France) CA Brive	1	0	0	1	0.00%
(Wales) Caerphilly	1	1	0	0	100.00%
(Scotland) Caledonia Reds	1	1	0	0	100.00%
(Wales) Cardiff Rugby	40	23	1	16	57.5%
(Wales) Cardiff RFC	5	3	0	2	60%
(France) Castres	2	2	0	0	100.00%
(Wales) Celtic Warriors	2	2	0	0	100.00%
(South Africa) Cheetahs	4	2	1	1	50%
(Ireland) Connacht*	48	34	1	13	70.83%
(Wales) Dragons	41	28	2	11	68.29%
(Wales) Ebbw Vale RFC	4	4	0	0	100.00%
(Scotland) Edinburgh	48	32	1	15	66.67%
(England) Exeter Chiefs	4	3	0	1	100%
(Scotland) Glasgow Warriors	47	24	2	21	51.06%
(England) Gloucester	5	1	0	4	20%
(England) Harlequins	9	6	0	3	66.67%
(France) La Rochelle	5	2	0	3	40%
(England) Leicester Tigers	12	7	0	5	58.33%
(Ireland) Leinster*	58	14	2	42	24.14%
(South Africa) Lions	4	3	0	1	75%
(Wales) Llanelli RFC	4	1	0	3	25%
(England) London Irish	2	1	0	1	50.00%
(France) Montpellier	4	3	0	1	{{#expre:3/4*100 round2}}%
(Ireland) Munster*	51	22	3	26	43.14%
(Wales) Neath RFC	3	2	0	1	66.67%
(England) Northampton Saints	8	5	0	3	62.5%
(Wales) Ospreys	44	23	0	21	52.27%
(France) Oyonnax	2	2	0	0	100.00%
(Wales) Pontypridd	1	1	0	0	100.00%
(France) Racing 92	4	3	0	1	75.00%
(England) Saracens	8	1	0	7	12.5%
(England) Sale Sharks	2	1	0	1	50%
(Wales) Scarlets†	48	27	3	18	56.25%
(South Africa) Sharks	6	3	0	3	50%
(France) Stade Français Paris	12	5	0	6	50%
(South Africa) Stormers	7	2	1	4	28.57%
(South Africa) Southern Kings	5	5	0	0	100.00%
(Wales) Swansea RFC	4	2	0	2	50.00%
(France) Toulon	2	0	0	2	0.00%
(France) Toulouse	15	6	1	8	40%
(France) US Colomiers	1	1	0	0	100%
(England) Wasps	8	2	0	6	25%
(Italy) Zebre	21	18	0	3	85.71%
Total	689	388	23	278	56.31%
*Matches played as part of the Irish Interprovincial Rugby Championship, separate from Celtic League fixtures, are not included in this table.
†Results do not include a match between the Benetton and Ulster declared a 0–0 draw due to the COVID-19 pandemic, nor do they include the cancelled Ulster vs Scarlets Rainbow Cup fixture in which Scarlets were awarded victory due to positive Covid tests in the Ulster squad.

Updated as of 31 October 2026.

== Records against Irish Provinces (1946–present) ==
Against	Played	Won	Drawn	Lost	% Won
Connacht	107	80	4	23	74.77%
Leinster	116	38	6	72	32.76%
Munster	111	56	11	44	50.45%
Total	334	174	21	139	52.1%

Correct as of 10 October 2026.

== Head coaches (professional era) ==
As of 31 October 2026

Coach	Season(s)	GP*	W	D	L	Win %	Loss %	Championships / Notes
(Ireland) Brian Bloomfield†	1995/96	7	4	0	3	57.1%	42.9%	
(England) Tony Russ	1996/97	7	2	0	5	28.6%	71.4%	
(Ireland) Dave Haslett	1997/98	9	2	0	7	22.2%	77.8%	
(Ireland) Harry Williams	1998/99 – 2000/01	41	18	2	21	43.9%	51.2%	European Cup (1998–99)
(South Africa) Alan Solomons	2001/02 – 2003/04	63	41	2	20	65.1%	31.7%	2003-04 Celtic Cup
(Ireland) Mark McCall	2004/05 – 2007/08 (mid-season)	91	46	3	42	50.5%	46.2%	2005-06 Celtic League
(Wales) Steve Williams	2007/08 (mid-season)	8	2	0	6	25%	75%	Interim
(Australia) Matt Williams	2007/08 (mid-season) – 2008/09	37	15	1	21	40.5%	56.8%	
(Ireland) Brian McLaughlin	2009/10 – 2011/12	93	54	2	37	58.1%	39.8%	
(New Zealand) Mark Anscombe	2012/13 – 2013/14	69	47	5	17	68.1%	24.6%	
(Australia) Les Kiss	2014/15	5	3	1	1	60%	20%	Interim
(Ireland) Neil Doak	2014/15 (mid-season) – 2016/17	85	48	2	35	56.5%	41.2%	
(New Zealand) Jono Gibbes	2017/18	30	17	2	11	56.7%	36.7%	
(England) Dan McFarland	2018/19 – 2023/24 (mid-season)	150	92	3	55	61.3%	36.7%	
(New Zealand) Dan Soper	2023/24 (mid-season)	1	1	0	0	100%	0%	Interim
(Ireland) Richie Murphy	2023/24 (mid-season) –	63	28	3	32	44.4%	50.8%	
Total	1995 –	754	418	25	311	55.4%	41.2%	
^{*}Games played are inclusive of matches played against touring international sides and friendlies against club opposition.
†Bloomfield was Ulster coach from 1993 to 1995. However, only matches from the professional era (1995/96 season) are included in this table.

== Personnel honours and records ==
Bold indicates active player

=== All Competitions ===
Most tries
Rank	Player	Tries
1	Andrew Trimble	76
2	Craig Gilroy	69
3	Tommy Bowe	62
4	**Jacob Stockdale**	56
5	**Nick Timoney**	46
6	Darren Cave	45
6	**Rob Herring**	45
8	**Robert Baloucoune**	37
8	**Stuart McCloskey**	37
10	**Tom Stewart**	35

Most caps
Rank	Player	Caps
1	**Rob Herring**	270
2	Andrew Trimble	229
2	Darren Cave	229
4	**Stuart McCloskey**	219
5	Rory Best	218
6	Roger Wilson	217
7	Craig Gilroy	213
8	Alan O'Connor	212
8	Andrew Warwick	212
10	Paul Marshall	206

Most points
Rank	Player	Points
1	David Humphreys	1,585
2	John Cooney	1,168
3	Ruan Pienaar	877
4	Paddy Jackson	872
5	Ian Humphreys	745
6	**Nathan Doak**	498
7	Paddy Wallace	411
8	Andrew Trimble	382
9	Craig Gilroy	345
10	Tommy Bowe	310

(correct as of 31 October 2026)

=== European Rugby Champions Cup ===
Including Heineken Cup and EPCR Challenge Cup

Most tries
Rank	Player	Tries
1	Andrew Trimble	27
2	**Jacob Stockdale**	15
2	David Humphreys	14
4	**Nick Timoney**	14
5	Tommy Bowe	13
5	**Rob Herring**	13
7	Darren Cave	12
8	John Cooney	11
8	**Robert Baloucoune**	11
10	Craig Gilroy	10
10	Tyrone Howe	10
10	Luke Marshall	10
10	**Stuart McCloskey**	10

Most caps
Rank	Player	Caps
1	Rory Best	75
2	Andrew Trimble	71
3	**Rob Herring**	66
4	**Iain Henderson**	58
5	David Humphreys	57
6	**Stuart McCloskey**	56
7	Paddy Wallace	54
8	Justin Fitzpatrick	53
9	Roger Wilson	51
10	Gary Longwell	50

Most points
Rank	Player	Points
1	David Humphreys	556
2	John Cooney	331
3	Paddy Jackson	246
4	Ian Humphreys	231
5	Ruan Pienaar	218
6	Simon Mason	200
7	Andrew Trimble	135
8	**Nathan Doak**	118
9	Paddy Wallace	101
10	**Jacob Stockdale**	70
10	**Nick Timoney**	70

(correct as of 17 October 2026)

=== United Rugby Championship ===
Including Celtic League, Celtic Cup, Pro12, Pro14 and Pro14 Rainbow Cup

Most tries
Rank	Player	Tries
1	Craig Gilroy	58
2	Andrew Trimble	50
3	Tommy Bowe	49
4	**Jacob Stockdale**	37
5	Darren Cave	33
6	**Nick Timoney**	32
7	**Rob Herring**	31
8	**Tom Stewart**	30
9	**Robert Baloucoune**	27
9	**Stuart McCloskey**	27

Most caps
Rank	Player	Caps
1	**Rob Herring**	201
2	Darren Cave	180
3	Robbie Diack	167
4	Paul Marshall	166
4	Roger Wilson	166
6	Craig Gilroy	164
6	Andrew Warwick	168
8	Alan O'Connor	159
9	Andrew Trimble	158
9	**Stuart McCloskey**	158

Most points
Rank	Player	Points
1	John Cooney	837
2	David Humphreys	786
3	Ruan Pienaar	659
4	Paddy Jackson	626
5	Ian Humphreys	514
6	**Nathan Doak**	397
7	Paddy Wallace	310
8	Craig Gilroy	290
9	Andrew Trimble	250
10	Tommy Bowe	245

(correct as of 31 October 2026)

Team of the Year

Competition	Irish players	Overseas players
2006–07	—	(Australia) Justin Harrison
2007–08	Tommy Bowe	—
2008–09	—	—
2009–10	—	—
2010–11	—	(South Africa) Ruan Pienaar
2011–12	—	—
2012–13	Luke Marshall	(New Zealand) Nick Williams
2013–14	Andrew Trimble	(South Africa) Johann Muller
2014–15	Craig Gilroy, Rory Best	(South Africa) Franco van der Merwe
2015–16	Craig Gilroy (2)	—
2016–17	—	(South Africa) Ruan Pienaar (2), (New Zealand) Charles Piutau
2017–18	John Cooney	—
2018–19	John Cooney (2), Stuart McCloskey	—
2019–20	John Cooney (3), Stuart McCloskey (2)	—
2020–21	John Cooney (4), Michael Lowry, Eric O'Sullivan	(South Africa) Marcell Coetzee
2021–22	James Hume, Nick Timoney	—
2022–23	—	—
2023–24	John Cooney (5)	—

Player of the Year

Competition	Irish players	Overseas players
2010–11	—	(South Africa) Ruan Pienaar
2012–13	—	(New Zealand) Nick Williams
2016–17	—	(New Zealand) Charles Piutau
2020–21	—	(South Africa) Marcell Coetzee

Individual Awards

Category	Player	Season	Total
Top Try Scorer	Tommy Bowe (Joint)	2005–06	10
Top Try Scorer	Craig Gilroy (Joint)	2015–16	10
Top Try Scorer	Marcell Coetzee (Joint)	2020–21	9
Top Try Scorer	Tom Stewart	2022–23	16
Top Point Scorer	David Humphreys	2001–02	122
Top Point Scorer	John Cooney	2017–18	175
Top Point Scorer	John Cooney (2) (Joint)	2020–21	113
Young Player of the Year	Luke Marshall	2012–13	N/A
Young Player of the Year	Tom Stewart	2022–23	N/A
Try of the Season	Andrew Trimble (Ulster vs Connacht)	2012–13	N/A
Try of the Season	Craig Gilroy (Ulster vs Scarlets)	2014–15	N/A
Try of the Season	Ruan Pienaar (Ulster vs Glasgow Warriors)	2016–17	N/A
Tackle Machine	Alan O'Connor	2021–22	195, 97.5%

Team Awards

- 2012–13 Pro12 Fair Play Award
- 2013–14 Pro12 Fair Play Award (joint)
- 2015–16 Pro12 Fair Play Award

=== British & Irish Lions ===
The following Ulster players, in addition to representing Ireland, have also represented the British & Irish Lions.

- Tommy Smyth: **1910**
- Alexander Foster: 1910
- Robert Alexander: 1938
- George Cromey: 1938
- Harry McKibbin: 1938
- Paddy Mayne: 1938
- Jack Kyle: 1950
- Jimmy Nelson: 1950
- Robin Thompson: **1955**
- Cecil Pedlow: 1955
- David Hewitt: 1959
- Raymond Hunter: 1962
- Willie John McBride: 1962, 1966, 1968, 1971, **1974**
- Syd Millar: 1962, 1968
- Mike Gibson: 1966, 1968, 1971, 1974, 1977
- Roger Young: 1966, 1968
- Stewart McKinney: 1974
- Richard Milliken: 1974
- Colin Patterson: 1980
- David Irwin: 1983
- Trevor Ringland: 1983, 1986
- Nigel Carr: 1986
- Steve Smith: 1989
- Eric Miller: 1997
- Jeremy Davidson: 1997, 2001
- Tyrone Howe: 2001
- Stephen Ferris: 2009
- Tommy Bowe: 2009, 2013
- Rory Best: 2013, 2017
- Tom Court: 2013
- Iain Henderson: 2017, 2021
- Jared Payne: 2017
- **Bold** indicates player was tour captain for the year in question

Note: Phillip Matthews played for the Lions in their victory against France in Paris. The game formed part of the celebrations of the bi-centennial of the French Revolution, but did not count as a "formal" Lions international.

=== Rugby Players Ireland ===
Ulster players awarded the Rugby Players Ireland Players' Player of the Year:

- Tommy Bowe (2008, 2010)
- Nick Williams (2013)
- Andrew Trimble (2014)
- Stuart McCloskey (2026)

Ulster players inducted into the Rugby Players Ireland Hall of fame:

- Paddy Johns (2004)
- Jeremy Davidson (2006)
- David Humphreys (2008)
- Simon Best (2014)
- Tommy Bowe (2021)
- Stephen Ferris (2025)
- Rory Best (2026)

=== Ulster Rugby Awards ===
Season	Player of the Year	Personality of the Year	Supporters' Club Player of the Year	Young Player of the Year	Rugby Writers' Player of the Year
1997–98	Andy Ward	Andy Ward			
1998–99	Simon Mason	David Humphreys			
1999–2000	Tony McWhirter	David Humphreys (2)			
2000–01	Tyrone Howe	Gary Longwell	Tyrone Howe		
2001–02	David Humphreys	Paddy Wallace	David Humphreys		
2002–03	Bryn Cunningham	Allen Clarke	Robbi Kempson		
2003–04	Roger Wilson	Alan Solomons	Andy Ward		
2004–05	Neil Best	Tommy Bowe	Kieran Campbell		
2005–06	Andrew Trimble	Justin Harrison		Stephen Ferris	
2006–07	Roger Wilson (2)	David Humphreys (3)		David Pollock	
2007–08	Tommy Bowe	Rory Best		Niall O'Connor	
2008–09	Rory Best	Stephen Ferris		Darren Cave	Stephen Ferris
2009–10	Andrew Trimble (2)	Chris Henry	Chris Henry	Jamie Smith	Chris Henry
2010–11	Ruan Pienaar	Johann Muller	Johann Muller	Nevin Spence	
2011–12	Chris Henry	Stephen Ferris (2)	Pedrie Wannenburg	Craig Gilroy	
2012–13	Andrew Trimble (3)	Nevin Spence	Andrew Trimble	Iain Henderson	
2013–14	Andrew Trimble (4)	Johann Muller	Andrew Trimble (2)	Paddy Jackson	Andrew Trimble
2014–15	Craig Gilroy	Rory Best (2)	Darren Cave	Stuart McCloskey	Craig Gilroy
2015–16	Stuart McCloskey	Nick Williams	Paddy Jackson	Kyle McCall	Franco van der Merwe
2016–17	Charles Piutau	Ruan Pienaar	Ruan Pienaar	Jacob Stockdale	Sean Reidy
2017–18	John Cooney	Paul Marshall	John Cooney	Nick Timoney	John Cooney
2018–19	Stuart McCloskey (2)	Rory Best (3)	Stuart McCloskey	Eric O'Sullivan	Marcell Coetzee
2019–20	John Cooney (2)	Marcell Coetzee	Marcell Coetzee	Tom O'Toole	Marcell Coetzee (2)
2020–21	Alan O'Connor	Iain Henderson	John Cooney (2)	James Hume	Nick Timoney
2021–22	James Hume	Ashleigh Orchard	Michael Lowry	Ethan McIlroy	James Hume
2022–23	Tom Stewart		Tom Stewart	Stewart Moore	Stuart McCloskey
2023–24	David McCann	Luke Marshall	John Cooney (3)	Harry Sheridan	David McCann
2024–25	Nick Timoney	Alan O'Connor	Nick Timoney	James McNabney	Jacob Stockdale
2025–26	Stuart McCloskey (3)	John Andrew	Stuart McCloskey (2)	Jack Murphy	Werner Kok

== Club rugby in Ulster ==
The IRFU Ulster Branch oversees a pyramid of club rugby competitions in Ulster.

=== Senior level ===
As of the 2025/26 season, Ulster has twelve senior rugby clubs, which compete in the All-Ireland League, the Ulster Rugby Premiership, the Ulster Senior Cup and the Ulster Senior Shield. They are:

- Ballynahinch (AIL Div 1A)
- City of Armagh (AIL Div 1B)
- Instonians (AIL Div 1B)
- Queen's University (AIL Div 1B)
- Ballymena (AIL Div 2A)
- Banbridge (AIL Div 2A)
- Dungannon (AIL Div 2A)
- Clogher Valley (AIL Div 2B)
- Malone (AIL Div 2B)
- Rainey (AIL Div 2B)
- Ballyclare (AIL Div 2C
- Belfast Harlequins (AIL Div 2C)

Ballynahinch are currently the highest ranked in the All-Ireland League, finishing fifth in Division 1A in 2023–24. They are holders of the 2023-24 Ulster Rugby Premiership, having won it three seasons in a row. Instonians are the holders of the 2023-24 Ulster Senior Cup.

Ballyclare were promoted to senior level for the first time in 2023 after finishing top of the 2022-23 Ulster Rugby Championship and winning playoffs against Connacht junior champions Creggs and Leinster League champions Monkstown.

=== Junior level ===
The second tier includes the three divisions of the Ulster Rugby Championship, and the 2nd XV League. Clubs in the Championship Division 1, and some of the clubs in the Second XV league, also compete in the Ulster Junior Cup. Clubs in the Championship Division 2, and some of the clubs in the Second XV league, compete in the Ulster Junior Shield. Clubs in the Championship Division 3 also compete in the Gordon West Cup and Gordon West Plate. Clubs in all the tier 2 divisions also compete in the McCrea Cup and the Ulster Towns Cup.

The third tier contains the two divisions of the Ulster Provincial Premiership, the Crawford Cup and the Crawford Plate.

The fourth tier consists of three divisions of the Provincial Regional - North, East 1 and East 2. These clubs also compete in the Forster Cup and the Forster Plate.

The fifth tier consists of five divisions: Regional North, Regional South divisions 1 and 2, and Regional East divisions 1 and 2. Clubs at this level also compete in the McCambley Cup and the Butler Shield.

== See also ==
- United Rugby Championship
- European Rugby Champions Cup
- History of rugby union matches between Leinster and Ulster
- History of rugby union matches between Munster and Ulster
- History of rugby union matches between Connacht and Ulster
