= Nic Fitisemanu =

- Born: 21 March 1978 (age 48) Wellington, New Zealand
- Height: 191 cm (6 ft 3 in)
- Weight: 127 kg (20 st 0 lb; 280 lb)
- School: St. Patrick's College
- University: Massey University

Rugby union career
- Position: Number 8
Amateur team(s)
Years	Team	Apps	(Points)
- Marist St Pats
–	Northern Suburbs		
Senior career
Years	Team	Apps	(Points)
2003	Petrarca Padova		
2004–2006	Nottingham	48	(60)
2006–2008	Newport Gwent Dragons	29	(30)
2008–2010	Bourg-en-Bresse	36	(65)

Nic Fitisemanu is a retired New Zealand rugby union player of Samoan descent who played number 8 for Nottingham, Newport Gwent Dragons and Bourg-en-Bresse.

He is now coaching at his former club Marist St Pats in Wellington.

He is a relative of actor and former professional wrestler Dwayne Johnson.
