= Neil Best =

Ireland international rugby union player

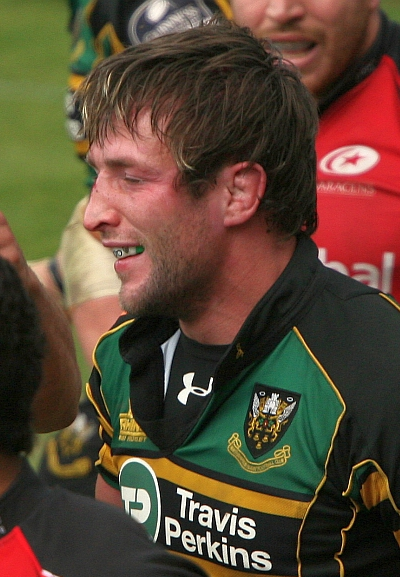
- Born: 3 April 1979 (age 47) Belfast, Northern Ireland
- Height: 1.91 m (6 ft 3 in)
- Weight: 105 kg (16 st 7 lb)

Rugby union career
- Position: Flanker
Senior career
Years	Team	Apps	(Points)
2002–2008	Ulster	122	(90)
2008–2010	Northampton Saints	50	(15)
2010–2013	Worcester Warriors	62	(20)
2013–2015	London Scottish	12	(5)
- Correct as of 29 January 2014
International career
Years	Team	Apps	(Points)
2008-09	Ireland A	9	(15)
2005-08	Ireland	18	(10)
- Correct as of 9 February 2015

Neil Best (born 3 April 1979 in Belfast, Northern Ireland) is a former rugby union player, who played for Ulster, Northampton Saints, Worcester Warriors, London Scottish, and the Irish national team. He played as a flanker.

He attended Wellington College Belfast and played his school rugby there until he left in 1997 after upper sixth. He started his club career with Malone RFC. He has a BSc in chemical engineering and Msc in polymer engineering. He scored 7 tries for Ulster in 2006 – three in the Heineken Cup and four in the Celtic League.

The Times newspaper reported that at the start of 2005 that he was arrested and later cautioned for a drunken assault on a club mate, which almost ended his career, however later in the year he made his Senior international debut for Ireland as a replacement v New Zealand in November 2005. Also in November 2005, he scored his 1st Test try for v Romania.

His form for Ulster and during the summer tour to Australia and New Zealand saw Best included in the Ireland squad for the 2006 Autumn Internationals. He was named man of the match in Ireland's 21–6 victory against Australia at Lansdowne Road.

It was announced in February 2008 that Best would join English side Northampton Saints at the end of the 2007/2008 season.

At the end of 2008, Best was banned from playing rugby for 18 weeks for reckless contact with James Haskell Best played in the Ireland A squad in the 2008 Churchill Cup, and also played an integral part in the Ireland A team that won the 2009 Churchill Cup.

In 2010, Neil joined Worcester Warriors, before retiring in 2015. In 2010 he also had to spend time on a drink driver's rehabilitation course after having been found to be almost twice the legal limit when breathalysed by police after he crashed his Audi A3 on the A512 at Thringstone, in Leicestershire. Best was banned from driving for 17 months and fined £1250. He now coaches Singapore Irish.
