= Andrew Trimble =

Irish rugby union player

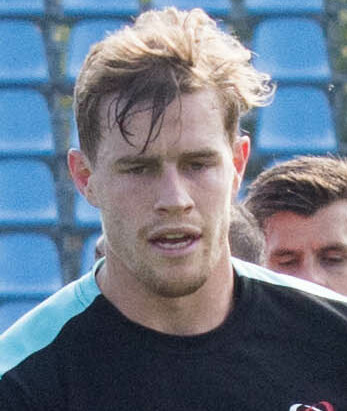
- Born: Andrew David Trimble; 20 October 1984 (age 42) Coleraine, Northern Ireland
- Height: 1.86 m (6 ft 1 in)
- Weight: 99 kg (15 st 8 lb; 218 lb)
- School: Coleraine Academical Institution
- University: Queen's University Belfast

Rugby union career
- Position(s): Wing, Centre
Amateur team(s)
Years	Team	Apps	(Points)
- Ballymena
Senior career
Years	Team	Apps	(Points)
2005–2018	Ulster	229	(382)
- Correct as of 26 February 2021
International career
Years	Team	Apps	(Points)
2005–2017	Ireland	70	(85)
2005–13	Ireland Wolfhounds	3	(5)
- Correct as of 26 February 2017

Andrew Trimble (born 20 October 1984) is a former Irish rugby union player from Northern Ireland who played for Ulster and represented Ireland at international level.

== Club career ==
He attended Coleraine Academical Institution, where he competed in the Ulster Schools Cup.

He played at outside centre or on the wing for Ulster Rugby. In April 2006 he signed a new three-year deal with Ulster. Trimble also played club rugby for Ballymena RFC in the AIB League and has represented Ireland Schools and the Ireland U21 team.

Due to a pre-season groin injury, however, he required surgery and missed part of the 2007–08 season. He later underwent a hernia operation. On 30 April 2009, Trimble underwent surgery on his right knee to remove a piece of chipped bone.

In May 2018, Trimble announced that he would be retiring from rugby at the end of the 2017–18 season. He does however, on occasion, still partake in amateur level competition with his local Coleraine rugby club.

== International career ==
Trimble, replacing the injured Brian O'Driscoll, made his debut for the Ireland national rugby union team during the 2005 IRB Autumn Internationals, against Australia. He started again the following week against Romania, securing victory for the Irish with two tries.

Building on his earlier success, Trimble made the 22-man squad for Ireland's 2006 Six Nations Championship opener against Italy. He came on as a second-half replacement to score his third try against France, the following week. Trimble was a member of the Ireland team for the 2007 Rugby World Cup, and played both on the wing and in the centre. Due to injuries, he missed both Ireland's 2008 and 2009 summer tours.

Trimble scored a try at the 2011 Rugby World Cup, in Ireland's 62-12 victory over Russia, before starting all 5 matches in the 2012 Six Nations Championship on the left wing, scoring in home matches against Italy and Scotland.

Trimble featured in the 2014 Six Nations Championship, scoring three tries in total, with a crucial one coming in the final Irish game of the championship against France in Paris which sealed the title.

In September 2015, Trimble was left out of the Ireland squad for the 2015 Rugby World Cup.

== Career statistics ==
=== International analysis by opposition ===
Opposition	Played	Win	Loss	Draw	Tries	Points	Win %
Argentina	4	3	1	0	1	5	75
Australia	5	2	3	0	0	0	40
Canada	1	1	0	0	1	5	100
England	9	4	5	0	0	0	44.44
Fiji	1	1	0	0	0	0	100
France	10	2	7	1	2	10	20
Italy	8	8	0	0	4	20	100
Namibia	1	1	0	0	1	5	100
New Zealand	7	1	6	0	1	5	16.67
Romania	1	1	0	0	2	10	100
Russia	1	1	0	0	1	5	100
Samoa	1	1	0	0	0	0	100
Scotland	7	5	2	0	3	15	71.43
South Africa	5	2	3	0	1	5	40
United States	1	1	0	0	0	0	100
Wales	8	4	3	1	2	10	50
Career	70	38	30	2	17	85	54.29%

as of 18 February 2024

== Honours ==
=== Individual ===
- Ulster Rugby Player of the Year (4): 2006, 2010, 2013, 2014
- BT Irish Rugby Union Players Association's newcomer of the year
- Pro14 Team of the Year (1): 2013-14
- IRUPA Players' Player of the Year (1): 2014
- The Guinness Rugby Writers of Ireland Player of the Year (1): 2014
- Ulster Rugby Writers’ Player of the Year (1): 2014
- Ulster Rugby Supporters Club Player of the Year (2): 2013, 2014

=== Ulster ===
- Celtic League (1): 2005-06

=== Ireland ===
- Six Nations (1): 2014
- Triple Crown (2): 2006, 2007

== Personal life ==
Trimble attended Coleraine Academical Institution. After graduating, he attended Queen's University Belfast to study physics. After a year however, he dropped out, and decided to study Theology at Belfast Bible College instead. He supports Liverpool F.C. Trimble married his wife, Anna, in March 2009.

Trimble is a devout Christian who reads Psalm 84 to prepare before every match.

Trimble holds both British and Irish passports.
