= Bryn Cunningham =

Northern Irish rugby union player

- Born: Bryn Cunningham; 30 March 1978 (age 48) Bangor, Northern Ireland
- Height: 1.83 m (6 ft 0 in)
- Weight: 90 kg (14 st)
- School: Bangor Grammar School
- University: Trinity College Dublin

Rugby union career
- Position: Fullback
Amateur team(s)
Years	Team	Apps	(Points)
- TCD
–	Bective Rangers		
–	Dungannon		
Senior career
Years	Team	Apps	(Points)
1997-2010	Ulster	150	(113)
- Correct as of 6 September 2009
International career
Years	Team	Apps	(Points)
2003–06	Ireland A	5	(0)

Bryn Cunningham (born 30 March 1978) is an Irish rugby union administrator and former player. He played fullback for Ulster, making 150 appearances between 1997 and 2010, and was the team's Player of the Year in 2002–2003. Since 2014 he has been responsible for player recruitment at Ulster, initially as Team Manager, later as Operations Director.

Cunningham grew up in Bangor, County Down, where he played soccer, golf, cricket, squash and hockey, and aspired to be a professional tennis player. He played rugby at Bangor Grammar School, and represented Ireland at schools level on an unbeaten tour of Australia in 1996. His rugby career continued at Trinity College Dublin, where he studied economics, and Dublin club Bective Rangers.

He made his debut for Ulster against Wasps in 1997, aged 19. Alongside his brother Jan, he was part of the team that won the 1998–99 Heineken Cup, and was an unused substitute in the final. He missed four months of college to be part of the campaign, later catching up from fellow-students' notes. He completed his studies, but failed to get a contract with Ulster and joined Dungannon RFC. After Dungannon won the All-Ireland League in 2001, he signed a full-time contract with Ulster. He was Ulster's Player of the Year in 2002–03. He was part of the team that won the 2003–04 Celtic Cup and the 2005–06 Celtic League. He retired after a series of injuries in October 2010 as the last remaining player from the 1999 Heineken Cup-winning team, having made 150 appearances for the province.

After retiring as a player, Cunningham worked as a players' agent, first with Cornerflag, then with Esportif International. and presented BBC Northern Ireland's rugby coverage. In 2014 he was appointed Ulster's Team Manager, responsible for player recruitment and contract negotiations. The following season, he was upgraded to Operations Director. He left his position of General Manager in October 2025, succeeded by Rory Best he has now been appointed as the new General Manager at Bath.
