= 2005–06 Llanelli Scarlets season =

Llanelli Scarlets
- 2005–06 season
- Chairman: Stuart Gallacher
- Head coach: Gareth Jenkins
- Celtic League: 6th
- Anglo-Welsh Cup: Runners-up
- Heineken Cup: Pool stage, 3rd
- Highest home attendance: 10,832 vs Ospreys (31 March 2006)
- Lowest home attendance: 3,042 vs Connacht (17 September 2005)

The 2005–06 season was the third season in the history of the Llanelli Scarlets rugby union team. They competed in the Celtic League, in which they finished in sixth place, as well as the Anglo-Welsh Cup and Heineken Cup. They reached the final of the Anglo-Welsh Cup, losing 26–10 to London Wasps at Twickenham Stadium in London. They were also drawn against Wasps in their Heineken Cup pool, as well as Toulouse for a second year in a row, but again managed just two wins to finish third, above only Edinburgh Gunners.

== Celtic League ==
=== Matches ===
Date	Opponents	H / A	Result F–A	Scorers	Attendance
2 September 2005	Edinburgh Gunners	H	15–21	Tries: B. Davies (2); Conversion: Hercus; Penalty: Hercus	5,688
11 September 2005	Border Reivers	A	24–15	Tries: J. Davies, Havili; Conversion: Hercus; Penalties: Hercus (2), B. Davies; Drop goal: Hercus	850
14 September 2005	Cardiff Blues	A	16–20	Tries: Mackey, Byrne; Penalties: Hercus, Bowen	6,254
17 September 2005	Connacht	H	25–17	Tries: Gravelle, Afeaki, Byrne; Conversions: Bowen (2); Penalties: Bowen (2)	3,042
23 September 2005	Munster	A	13–14	Tries: Byrne, Watkins; Penalty: Hercus	5,000
16 October 2005	Glasgow Warriors	H	24–20	Tries: Louw, L. Davies; Conversion: Bowen; Penalties: Bowen (4)	6,333
23 December 2005	Newport Gwent Dragons	A	28–16	Tries: D. Jones, James, Dunlea; Conversions: Hercus (2); Penalties: Hercus (3)	5,723
2 January 2006	Cardiff Blues	H	32–13	Tries: Madden, M. Jones, King, Watkins, Peel; Conversions: Bowen (3); Penalty: Bowen	9,364
7 January 2006	Leinster	H	20–18	Tries: Watkins, B. Davies; Conversions: Hercus (2); Penalties: B. Davies, Hercus	6,126
27 January 2006	Ulster	A	13–30	Try: James; Conversion: Bowen; Penalties: B. Davies (2)	7,986
18 February 2006	Connacht	A	19–33	Tries: Daniel, King; Penalties: Hercus (2), Bowen	2,000
31 March 2006 (Note: Postponed from 28 December 2005 due to a frozen pitch at Stradey Park)	Ospreys	H	30–17	Tries: Byrne, King; Conversion: Hercus; Penalties: Hercus (3), B. Davies (2); Drop goal: Hercus	10,832
14 April 2006	Leinster	A	22–30	Tries: I. Thomas, Byrne, G. Thomas; Conversions: C. Thomas; Penalty: C. Thomas	7,250
18 April 2006	Ospreys	A	13–25	Try: Watkins; Conversion: Hercus; Penalties: Hercus (2)	15,183
22 April 2006	Newport Gwent Dragons	H	36–17	Tries: M. Jones (3), James (2), Byrne; Conversion: C. Thomas (2), Hercus	6,500
28 April 2006	Edinburgh Gunners	A	18–35	Tries: M. Jones, James; Conversion: Hercus; Penalties: Bowen, Hercus	2,123
6 May 2006	Border Reivers	H	30–26	Tries: King (2), Dunlea, M. Jones; Conversions: Hercus (2); Penalties: Hercus (2)	5,033
9 May 2006 (Note: Postponed from 25 March 2006 due to a waterlogged pitch at Stradey Park.)	Munster	H	18–6	Tries: Popham (2); Conversion: C. Evans; Penalties: C. Evans (2)	5,754
12 May 2006	Glasgow Warriors	A	10–17	Try: Gravelle; Conversion: C. Evans; Penalty: C. Evans	1,014
19 May 2006	Ulster	H	12–12	Tries: John (2); Conversion: C. Evans	6,425

=== Table ===
Pos.	Team	Pld	W	D	L	PF	PA	PD	TF	TA	TBP	LBP	Pts
4	(Wales) Cardiff Blues	20	11	0	9	475	389	+86	51	38	6	5	63
5	(Scotland) Edinburgh Gunners	20	11	0	9	418	415	+3	48	45	5	3	60
6	(Wales) Llanelli Scarlets	20	10	1	9	418	402	+16	49	37	3	4	57
7	(Wales) Ospreys	20	11	0	9	381	409	−28	33	38	1	2	55
8	(Wales) Newport Gwent Dragons	20	7	0	13	355	456	−101	40	51	2	7	45

== Anglo-Welsh Cup ==
=== Pool stage ===
Date	Opponents	H / A	Result F–A	Scorers	Attendance	Pool position
2 October 2005	Leeds Tykes	A	7–28	Tries: Selley, I. Thomas, Watkins; Conversions: Bowen (2); Penalties: Bowen (2); Drop goal: Bowen	2,582	2nd
9 October 2005	Newcastle Falcons	H	22–20	Tries: Byrne, Gravelle, Hercus; Conversions: Hercus (2); Penalty: Bowen	7,195	1st
2 December 2005	Sale Sharks	H	24–23	Tries: King, Louw, Penalty try Conversions: Hercus (3); Penalty: Hercus	6,835	1st

=== Knockout stage ===
Date	Round	Opponents	H / A	Result F–A	Scorers	Attendance
4 March 2006	Semi-final	Bath	N	27–26	Tries: Dunlea, King, M. Jones; Conversion: Hercus (3); Penalties: Hercus (2)	50,811
9 April 2006	Final	London Wasps	N	10–26	Try: B. Davies; Conversion: Hercus; Penalty: Hercus	57,212

== Heineken Cup ==
=== Pool stage ===
Date	Opponents	H / A	Result F–A	Scorers	Attendance	Pool position
22 October 2005	Toulouse	A	28–50	Tries: James, Louw, Watkins; Conversions: Bowen, Hercus; Penalties: Bowen (3)	16,280	4th
29 October 2005	Edinburgh Gunners	H	15–13	Tries: Popham, D. Jones; Conversion: Bowen; Penalty: Bowen	6,375	3rd
11 December 2005	London Wasps	H	21–13	Tries: James, M. Jones; Conversion: Bowen; Penalties: Bowen (3)	7,348	2nd
18 December 2005	London Wasps	A	14–48	Tries: Watkins, B. Davies; Conversions: Bowen, Hercus	7,157	3rd
14 January 2006	Edinburgh Gunners	A	32–33	Tries: B. Davies, Byrne, Popham, Selley; Conversions: Hercus (3); Penalties: B. Davies, Hercus	2,608	3rd
21 January 2006	Toulouse	H	42–49	Tries: B. Davies (2), Madden, King, Peel; Conversions: Hercus (4); Penalties: Hercus (3)	10,196	3rd

Team	P	W	D	L	TF	TA	TD	PF	PA	PD	TBP	LBP	Pts
(France) Toulouse (1)	6	5	1	0	22	11	11	188	124	64	3	0	25
(England) London Wasps	6	2	1	3	18	13	5	173	118	55	2	2	14
(Wales) Llanelli Scarlets	6	2	0	4	18	26	−8	152	206	−54	2	2	12
(Scotland) Edinburgh	6	2	0	4	14	22	−8	121	186	−65	1	2	11
