= 2003–04 Llanelli Scarlets season =

Llanelli Scarlets
- 2003–04 season
- Chairman: Stuart Gallacher
- Head coach: Gareth Jenkins
- Celtic League: 1st
- Celtic Cup: Quarter-finals
- Heineken Cup: Quarter-finals
- Highest home attendance: 10,800 vs Biarritz (9 April 2004)
- Lowest home attendance: 2,460 vs Newport Gwent Dragons (20 September 2003)

The 2003–04 season was the inaugural season in the history of the Llanelli Scarlets rugby union team. They competed in the Celtic League, which they won, as well as the Celtic Cup and Heineken Cup, reaching the quarter-finals of both competitions. They played their home matches at Stradey Park along with Llanelli RFC, who had played there since 1879.

== Celtic League ==
=== Matches ===
Date	Opponents	H / A	Result F–A	Scorers	Attendance
6 September 2003	Newport Gwent Dragons	H	35–11	Tries: S. Quinnell (2); Conversions: Bowen (2); Penalties: Bowen (6); Drop goal: B. Davies	4,300
12 September 2003	Munster	A	19–12	Try: Bowen; Conversion: Bowen; Penalties: Bowen (3); Drop goal: Bowen	7,000
26 September 2003	Celtic Warriors	H	27–22	Tries: B. Davies, J. Davies; Conversion: Bowen; Penalties: Bowen (5)	4,875
10 October 2003	Edinburgh	A	16–25	Try: Byrne; Conversion: Bowen; Penalties: Bowen (2); Drop goal: Bowen	2,200
18 October 2003	Cardiff Blues	H	35–20	Tries: Selley, Watkins; Conversions: Bowen (2); Penalties: Bowen (7)	4,966
24 October 2003	Connacht	A	25–20	Tries: B. Davies, Phillips, Selley; Conversions: Bowen (2); Penalties: Bowen (2)	2,310
1 November 2003	Borders	H	36–20	Tries: Gravelle, Selley, Quinnell, Rees; Conversions: Bowen (2); Penalties: Bowen (4)	5,060
7 November 2003	Leinster	A	20–31	Tries: Selley, Boobyer; Conversions: B. Davies (2); Penalties: Bowen (2)	2,300
28 November 2003	Glasgow	A	31–18	Tries: J. Davies, Selley, Byrne; Conversions: S. Jones (2); Penalties: S. Jones (4)	2,345
2 January 2004	Neath-Swansea Ospreys	H	28–15	Tries: B. Davies (2), Watkins, Quinnell; Conversion: Bowen; Penalties: Bowen (2)	10,195
6 February 2004	Ulster	A	9–10	Penalties: Bowen (2); Drop goal: Phillips	6,600
13 February 2004	Newport Gwent Dragons	A	9–15	Penalties: Bowen (3)	4,545
20 February 2004	Munster	H	37–20	Tries: G. Williams, Rees, Watkins, Bowen; Conversions: Bowen (4); Penalties: Bowen (3)	6,169
27 February 2004	Celtic Warriors	A	15–16	Penalties: Bowen (5)	3,500
6 March 2004	Edinburgh	H	47–12	Tries: Finau, B. Davies (2), Gravelle, Wyatt (2), Watkins; Conversions: Bowen (6)	4,792
13 March 2004	Cardiff Blues	A	6–0	Penalties: Bowen (2)	7,000
26 March 2004	Connacht	H	33–33	Tries: Griffiths, Watkins, Selley; Conversions: Bowen (3); Penalties: Bowen (4)	4,522
2 April 2004	Borders	A	41–8	Tries: Evans, Taylor (2), Watkins, Finau, Thiel; Conversions: Bowen (4); Penalty: Bowen	2,000
16 April 2004	Leinster	H	51–20	Tries: B. Davies (2), Evans, Peel (2), Thiel; Conversions: S. Jones (6); Penalties: S. Jones (3)	5,679
1 May 2004	Glasgow	H	36–26	Tries: Peel (2), Wyatt, Hodges; Conversions: S. Jones (2); Penalties: S. Jones (3), Bowen	5,422
8 May 2004	Neath-Swansea Ospreys	A	18–15	Tries: Thiel, Bowen; Conversion: Bowen; Penalties: S. Jones (2)	7,632
15 May 2004	Ulster	H	23–16	Try: Watkins; Penalties: S. Jones (5); Drop goal: S. Jones	10,500

=== Table ===
Pos.	Team	Pld	W	D	L	PF	PA	PD	TF	TA	TBP	LBP	Pts
1	(Wales) Llanelli Scarlets	22	16	1	5	597	385	+212	57	39	7	3	76
2	(Ireland) Ulster	22	15	0	7	617	363	+254	67	29	8	4	72
3	(Wales) Newport Gwent Dragons	22	16	0	6	590	449	+141	59	41	7	1	72

== Celtic Cup ==
Date	Round	Opponents	H / A	Result F–A	Scorers	Attendance
20 September 2003	First round	Newport Gwent Dragons	H	40–6	Tries: Selley (2), B. Davies, Rees, Phillips; Conversions: Bowen (3); Penalties: Bowen (3)	2,460
3 October 2003	Quarter-finals	Connacht	H	12–14	Tries: Finau, Burn; Conversion: Bowen	5,081

== Heineken Cup ==
=== Pool stage ===
Date	Opponents	H / A	Result F–A	Scorers	Attendance	Pool position
5 December 2003	Northampton Saints	H	14–9	Try: Quinnell; Penalties: S. Jones (3)	9,128	2nd
14 December 2003	Borders	A	41–10	Tries: B. Davies (2), Quinnell, Peel, Evans; Conversions: S. Jones (2); Penalties: S. Jones (4)	3,260	1st
9 January 2004	Agen	H	19–15	Try: Quinnell; Conversion: S. Jones; Penalties: S. Jones (4)	9,438	1st
17 January 2004	Agen	A	15–22	Penalties: S. Jones (5)	7,000	2nd
23 January 2004	Borders	H	53–7	Tries: M. Jones, Watkins, Finau, Bowen, J. Davies, Quinnell (2), Gravelle; Conversions: Bowen (5); Penalty: Bowen	7,393	1st
1 February 2004	Northampton Saints	A	18–9	Tries: D. Jones, B. Davies; Conversion: S. Jones; Penalties: S. Jones (2)	12,031	1st

Team	P	W	D	L	TF	TA	TD	PF	PA	PD	TBP	LBP	Pts
(Wales) Llanelli Scarlets	6	5	0	1	17	5	12	160	72	+88	2	1	23
(England) Northampton Saints	6	4	0	2	13	4	9	121	54	+67	1	1	18
(France) Agen	6	2	0	4	8	7	1	83	94	−11	1	2	11
(Scotland) Borders	6	1	0	5	4	26	−22	39	183	−144	0	0	4

=== Knockout stage ===
Date	Round	Opponents	H / A	Result F–A	Scorers	Attendance
9 April 2004	Quarter-finals	Biarritz	H	10–27	Try: S. Jones; Conversion: S. Jones; Penalty: S. Jones	10,800
