= 2004–05 Llanelli Scarlets season =

Llanelli Scarlets
- 2004–05 season
- Chairman: Stuart Gallacher
- Head coach: Gareth Jenkins
- Celtic League: 5th
- Celtic Cup: Final
- Heineken Cup: Pool stage, 3rd
- Highest home attendance: 8,266 vs Neath–Swansea Ospreys (7 May 2005)
- Lowest home attendance: 4,129 vs Borders (17 December 2004)

The 2004–05 season was the second season in the history of the Llanelli Scarlets rugby union team. They competed in the Celtic League, in which they finished in fifth place, as well as the Celtic Cup and Heineken Cup. They reached the final of the Celtic Cup, losing 27–16 to Munster at Lansdowne Road in Dublin, but won just two matches in their Heineken Cup pool, finishing third behind Toulouse and Northampton Saints.

== Celtic League ==
=== Matches ===
Date	Opponents	H / A	Result F–A	Scorers	Attendance
3 September 2004	Borders	A	26–15	Tries: Finau, Wyatt, G. Thomas, Easterby; Conversions: Bowen (3)	2,000
10 September 2004	Neath–Swansea Ospreys	H	6–23	Penalties: A. Thomas (2)	8,173
17 September 2004	Newport Gwent Dragons	A	0–15		5,182
25 September 2004	Edinburgh	H	37–16	Tries: Selley, Watkins, A. Thomas, Taylor, G. Evans; Conversions: A. Thomas (2), Bowen; Penalties: A. Thomas, Bowen	7,648
3 October 2004	Munster	A	13–19	Tries: G. Evans, Phillips; Penalty: Bowen	9,000
9 October 2004	Connacht	H	21–29	Tries: Peel, D. Jones; Conversions: Bowen; Penalties: Bowen (3)	6,281
7 November 2004	Cardiff Blues	A	10–14	Try: B. Davies; Conversion: Bowen; Penalty: Bowen	4,832
14 November 2004	Leinster	H	24–22	Tries: Watkins, Havili, B. Davies; Conversions: Bowen (3); Penalty: Bowen	4,200
19 November 2004	Glasgow	A	29–40	Tries: B. Davies, Finau, Phillips, G. Evans; Conversions: Bowen (3); Penalty: Bowen	1,751
28 November 2004	Ulster	H	22–9	Try: John; Conversion: Bowen; Penalties: Bowen (5)	5,334
17 December 2004	Borders	H	39–22	Tries: Bowen, Havili (2), D. Jones, Selley, Watkins; Conversions: Bowen (2), A. Thomas; Penalty: Bowen	4,129
26 December 2004	Neath–Swansea Ospreys	A	7–28	Try: Mills; Conversion: Bowen	10,280
1 January 2005	Newport Gwent Dragons	H	35–26	Tries: Watkins (2), Jones (2); Conversions: Bowen (3); Penalties: Bowen (3)	6,372
21 January 2005	Edinburgh	A	0–23		1,628
29 January 2005	Munster	H	32–17	Tries: Watkins, Powell, Havili, Wyatt; Conversions: Bowen (3); Penalties: Bowen (2)	7,530
18 February 2005	Connacht	A	18–11	Tries: Phillips (2); Conversion: Bowen; Penalties: Bowen (2)	1,660
20 March 2005	Cardiff Blues	H	25–13	Tries: John, Powell, Cooper; Conversions: Bowen (2); Penalties: Bowen (2)	6,116
25 March 2005	Leinster	A	25–31	Try: Selley; Conversion: Bowen; Penalties: Bowen (5); Drop goal: Bowen	4,200
9 April 2005	Glasgow	H	30–57	Tries: Havili (2), Selley, Wyatt, B. Davies; Conversion: Bowen; Penalty: Bowen	6,480
15 April 2005	Ulster	A	3–16	Penalty: Bowen	7,948

=== Table ===
Pos.	Team	Pld	W	D	L	PF	PA	PD	TF	TA	TBP	LBP	Pts
3	(Ireland) Leinster	20	12	1	7	455	350	+105	46	32	4	3	57
4	(Wales) Newport Gwent Dragons	20	11	0	9	381	436	−55	39	43	4	2	50
5	(Wales) Llanelli Scarlets	20	9	0	11	402	446	−44	48	42	7	3	46
6	(Scotland) Glasgow Warriors	20	8	1	11	465	466	−1	40	58	4	7	45
7	(Scotland) Edinburgh	20	9	0	11	409	407	+2	47	40	4	4	44

== Celtic Cup ==
Date	Round	Opponents	H / A	Result F–A	Scorers	Attendance
22 April 2005	Quarter-finals	Newport Gwent Dragons	A	49–19	Tries: Selley (3), Havili (2), G. Evans; Conversions: C. Thomas (5); Penalties: C. Thomas (2), B. Davies	3,120
29 April 2005	Semi-finals	Neath–Swansea Ospreys	H	23–15	Tries: J. Davies, G. Quinnell; Conversions: C. Thomas (2); Penalties: C. Thomas (2), B. Davies	8,266
6 May 2005	Final	Munster	N	16–27	Try: Phillips 34' c Conversion: C. Thomas; Penalties: C. Thomas (3) 12', 42', 59'	11,500

== Heineken Cup ==
=== Pool stage ===
The Scarlets were drawn into Pool 3 for the 2004–05 Heineken Cup. For the second season in a row, they were paired with Northampton Saints, along with Toulouse from France and Glasgow from Scotland. They began the pool stage on 22 October with a narrow 9–6 defeat at home to Toulouse, a game they should have won thanks to two missed try-scoring opportunities. The following week they faced Northampton, whom they had beaten twice the previous season, but this time they managed just a penalty as Northampton recorded a 25–3 win.

In December, the Scarlets recorded their first wins, home and away against Glasgow. In the away leg on 5 December, the Scarlets claimed the bonus point before half-time thanks to tries from Gavin Thomas, Matthew Watkins (2) and Garan Evans, and held off a comeback by Glasgow to claim a 29–26 win. Another bonus-point victory at Stradey Park the following week, thanks to braces from Aisea Havili, Tal Selley and another try from Vernon Cooper, kept the Scarlets in with a chance of qualifying for the quarter-finals.

That chance was extinguished when European rugby resumed in January 2005, as a last-minute try from World Cup-winning England hooker Steve Thompson gave Northampton a 22–20 win. Although the Scarlets could finish second in their pool with victory over Toulouse the following week, their points total would not be enough to be one of the two best runners-up. Although the Scarlets scored five tries against Toulouse, including a double from Chris Wyatt, the French side scored eight of their own to win 53–36, confirming a third-place finish for the Scarlets.

Date	Opponents	H / A	Result F–A	Scorers	Attendance	Pool position
22 October 2004	Toulouse	H	6–9	Penalties: A. Thomas (2)	7,867	3rd
30 October 2004	Northampton Saints	A	3–25	Penalty: A. Thomas	11,939	3rd
5 December 2004	Glasgow	A	29–26	Tries: G. Thomas, Watkins (2), G. Evans; Conversions: Bowen (3); Penalty: Bowen	2,281	3rd
12 December 2004	Glasgow	H	38–22	Tries: Havili (2), Selley (2), Cooper; Conversions: Watkins, Bowen; Penalties: Bowen (3)	4,500	3rd
9 January 2005	Northampton Saints	H	20–22	Try: G. Thomas; Penalties: Bowen (5)	7,197	3rd
14 January 2005	Toulouse	A	36–53	Tries: Wyatt (2), J. Davies, Powell, Selley; Conversions: Bowen (4); Penalty: Bowen	16,900	3rd

Team	P	W	D	L	TF	TA	TD	PF	PA	PD	TBP	LBP	Pts
(France) Toulouse (2)	6	5	0	1	21	9	12	181	104	+77	3	1	24
(England) Northampton Saints (7)	6	5	0	1	11	7	4	128	101	+27	1	0	21
(Wales) Llanelli Scarlets	6	2	0	4	15	17	−2	132	157	−25	3	2	13
(Scotland) Glasgow	6	0	0	6	11	25	−14	107	186	−79	0	2	2
