= 2005–06 Powergen Anglo-Welsh Cup =

Tournament details
- Countries: England; Wales
- Tournament format(s): Round-robin and knockout
- Date: 30 September 2005 – 9 April 2006

Tournament statistics
- Teams: 16
- Matches played: 27

Final
- Venue: Twickenham Stadium
- Attendance: 57,212
- Champions: (England) London Wasps (6th title)
- Runners-up: (Wales) Llanelli Scarlets

The 2005–06 Powergen Anglo-Welsh Cup was the 35th annual rugby union cup competition in England, and the first since it incorporated the four Welsh regional sides to become the Anglo-Welsh Cup. Whereas the competition previously featured teams from the lower levels of the English rugby pyramid, this season it was contested by the 12 teams from the English Premiership and the four Welsh regional sides from the Celtic League.

The competition began with a pool stage, in which each pool consisted of a Welsh region and three English sides, with each team playing the others in the group once. Pool matches were played in September, October and December 2005. The team that finished top of each pool advanced to the semi-finals. The semi-finals were played at the Millennium Stadium in Cardiff on 4 March 2006, and the final was played at Twickenham Stadium in London on 9 April.

London Wasps beat Leicester Tigers 22–17 in their semi-final, while Llanelli Scarlets beat Bath 27–26 in theirs; Wasps then beat the Scarlets 26–10 in the final.

== Group stages ==
=== Group A ===
Team	Pld	W	D	L	PF	PA	PD	BP	Pts
(England) Bath	3	3	0	0	73	42	+31	0	12
(England) Gloucester	3	2	0	1	69	34	+35	1	9
(Wales) Ospreys	3	1	0	2	70	78	−8	2	6
(England) Bristol	3	0	0	3	44	102	−58	1	1

1 October 2005

Bath (England)	25–10	(England) Bristol
	Report

Recreation Ground, Bath
Attendance: 8,993
Referee: Rob Debney (England)

1 October 2005

Gloucester (England)	23–7	(Wales) Ospreys
	Report

Kingsholm Stadium, Gloucester
Attendance: 6,154
Referee: Roy Maybank (England)

9 October 2005

Bristol (England)	6–34	(England) Gloucester
	Report

Memorial Stadium, Bristol
Attendance: 5,018
Referee: Sean Davey (England)

9 October 2005

Ospreys (Wales)	20–27	(England) Bath
	Report

Liberty Stadium, Swansea
Attendance: 5,018
Referee: Nigel Owens (Wales)

3 December 2005

Bath (England)	21–12	(England) Gloucester
	Report

Recreation Ground, Bath
Attendance: 8,563
Referee: Nigel Whitehouse (Wales)

4 December 2005

Bristol (England)	28–43	(Wales) Ospreys
	Report

Memorial Stadium, Bristol
Attendance: 7,684
Referee: Bruce Robertson (England)

=== Group B ===
Team	Pld	W	D	L	PF	PA	PD	BP	Pts
(England) London Wasps	3	3	0	0	112	53	+59	2	14
(Wales) Cardiff Blues	3	1	0	2	79	87	−8	2	6
(England) London Irish	3	1	0	2	66	85	−19	1	5
(England) Saracens	3	1	0	2	60	92	−32	1	5

1 October 2005

Cardiff Blues (Wales)	37–20	(England) Saracens
	Report

Cardiff Arms Park, Cardiff
Attendance: 8,212
Referee: Phil Fear (Wales)

2 October 2005

London Irish (England)	26–30	(England) London Wasps
	Report

Madejski Stadium, Reading
Attendance: 6,829
Referee: Ashley Rowden (England)

7 October 2005

London Wasps (England)	40–19	(Wales) Cardiff Blues
	Report

Adams Park, High Wycombe
Attendance: 6,427
Referee: Chris White (England)

9 October 2005

Saracens (England)	32–13	(England) London Irish
	Report

Vicarage Road, Watford
Attendance: 6,103
Referee: Dave Pearson (England)

4 December 2005

London Irish (England)	27–23	(Wales) Cardiff Blues
	Report

Madejski Stadium, Reading
Attendance: 6,024
Referee: Sean Davey (England)

4 December 2005

London Wasps (England)	42–8	(England) Saracens
	Report

Adams Park, High Wycombe
Attendance: 6,377
Referee: Ashley Rowden (England)

=== Group C ===
Team	Pld	W	D	L	PF	PA	PD	BP	Pts
(Wales) Llanelli Scarlets	3	3	0	0	74	50	+24	0	12
(England) Newcastle Falcons	3	1	1	1	72	49	+23	2	8
(England) Sale Sharks	3	1	0	2	77	68	+9	2	6
(England) Leeds Tykes	3	0	1	2	35	91	−56	0	2

2 October 2005

Leeds Tykes (England)	7–28	(Wales) Llanelli Scarlets
	Report

Headingley Rugby Stadium, Leeds
Attendance: 2,582
Referee: Tony Spreadbury (England)

2 October 2005

Newcastle Falcons (England)	34–9	(England) Sale Sharks
	Report

Kingston Park, Newcastle-upon-Tyne
Attendance: 4,917
Referee: Sean Davey (England)

7 October 2005

Sale Sharks (England)	45–10	(England) Leeds Tykes
	Report

Edgeley Park, Stockport
Attendance: 4,572
Referee: Martin Fox (England)

9 October 2005

Llanelli Scarlets (Wales)	22–20	(England) Newcastle Falcons
	Report

Stradey Park, Llanelli
Attendance: 7,195
Referee: Nigel Whitehouse (Wales)

2 December 2005

Leeds Tykes (England)	18–18	(England) Newcastle Falcons
	Report

Headingley Rugby Stadium, Leeds
Attendance: 3,316
Referee: Wayne Barnes (England)

2 December 2005

Llanelli Scarlets (Wales)	24–23	(England) Sale Sharks
	Report

Stradey Park, Llanelli
Attendance: 6,835
Referee: Jean-Pierre Matheu (France)

=== Group D ===
Team	Pld	W	D	L	PF	PA	PD	BP	Pts
(England) Leicester Tigers	3	2	0	1	86	56	+30	2	10
(England) Northampton Saints	3	2	0	1	70	43	+27	1	9
(Wales) Newport Gwent Dragons	3	2	0	1	64	57	+7	0	8
(England) Worcester Warriors	3	0	0	3	33	97	−64	0	0

30 September 2005

Newport Gwent Dragons (Wales)	24–15	(England) Leicester Tigers
	Report

Rodney Parade, Newport
Attendance: 6,327
Referee: Nigel Owens (Wales)

1 October 2005

Worcester Warriors (England)	7–22	(England) Northampton Saints
	Report

Sixways Stadium, Worcester
Attendance: 7,561
Referee: Martin Fox (England)

8 October 2005

Leicester Tigers (England)	42–16	(England) Worcester Warriors
	Report

Welford Road Stadium, Leicester
Attendance: 8,642
Referee: Alain Rolland (Ireland)

8 October 2005

Northampton Saints (England)	42–16	(Wales) Newport Gwent Dragons
	Report

Franklin's Gardens, Northampton
Attendance: 11,695
Referee: Tony Spreadbury (England)

3 December 2005

Leicester Tigers (England)	29–16	(England) Northampton Saints
	Report

Welford Road Stadium, Leicester
Attendance: 11,072
Referee: Chris White (England)

3 December 2005

Newport Gwent Dragons (Wales)	33–10	(England) Worcester Warriors
	Report

Rodney Parade, Newport
Attendance: 4,017
Referee: Neil Ballard (Wales)

== Semi-finals ==
4 March 2006

London Wasps (England)	22–17	(England) Leicester Tigers
Try: Erinle; Con: Staunton; Pen: Staunton (5)	Report	Try: Varndell; Lloyd; Hipkiss; Con: Goode

Millennium Stadium, Cardiff
Attendance: 50,811
Referee: Nigel Owens (Wales)

4 March 2006

Bath (England)	26–27	(Wales) Llanelli Scarlets
Try: Crockett; Maddock; Con: Malone (2); Pen: Malone (4)	Report	Try: Dunlea; King; M. Jones; Con: Hercus (3); Pen: Hercus (2)

Millennium Stadium, Cardiff
Attendance: 50,811
Referee: Malcolm Changleng (Scotland)

== Final ==
9 April 2006

Llanelli Scarlets (Wales)	10–26	(England) London Wasps
Try: B. Davies; Con: Hercus; Pen: Hercus	Report	Try: Voyce (2); Con: Van Gisbergen (2); Pen: Van Gisbergen (3); Drop: King

Twickenham Stadium, London
Attendance: 57,212
Referee: Alan Lewis (Ireland) (Note: Replaced by Simon McDowell (Ireland) in the 41st minute)

FB	15	(Wales) Barry Davies
RW	14	(Wales) Mark Jones
OC	13	(Wales) Matthew Watkins
IC	12	(New Zealand) Regan King
LW	11	(Wales) Dafydd James
FH	10	(United States) Mike Hercus
SH	9	(England) Clive Stuart-Smith
N8	8	(Wales) Alix Popham
OF	7	(Wales) Gavin Thomas
BF	6	(Ireland) Simon Easterby (c)	(substituted off) 27'
RL	5	(Wales) Adam Jones
LL	4	(Tonga) Inoke Afeaki	(substituted off) 67'
TP	3	(Wales) John Davies	(substituted off) 64'
HK	2	(Wales) Matthew Rees	(substituted off) 73'
LP	1	(Wales) Phil John
Replacements:
HK	16	(Wales) Aled Gravelle	(substituted in) 73'
PR	17	(Wales) Martyn Madden	(substituted in) 64'
LK	18	(Wales) Vernon Cooper	(substituted in) 67'
FL	19	(Wales) Dafydd Jones	(substituted in) 27'
SH	20	(Wales) Liam Davies
FH	21	(Wales) Gareth Bowen
FB	22	(Wales) Garan Evans
Coach:
(Wales) Gareth Jenkins

FB	15	(England) Mark van Gisbergen
RW	14	(England) Paul Sackey
OC	13	(England) Josh Lewsey
IC	12	(England) Stuart Abbott
LW	11	(England) Tom Voyce
FH	10	(Ireland) Jeremy Staunton		(substituted off) 54'
SH	9	(Ireland) Eoin Reddan		(substituted off) 54'
N8	8	(England) Lawrence Dallaglio (c)
OF	7	(Ireland) Johnny O'Connor		(substituted off) 1'
BF	6	(England) Joe Worsley		(substituted off) 78'
RL	5	(England) Richard Birkett
LL	4	(England) Simon Shaw
TP	3	(England) Tim Payne
HK	2	(France) Raphaël Ibañez		(substituted off) 61'
LP	1	(England) Alistair McKenzie	(yellow card) 29'
Replacements:
HK	16	(New Zealand) Joe Ward		(substituted in) 61'
PR	17	(Ireland) Peter Bracken			(substituted in) 31'
LK	18	(Samoa) Daniel Leo		(substituted in) 1'	(substituted off) 31'
FL	19	(England) James Haskell		(substituted in) 78'
SH	20	(England) Matt Dawson		(substituted in) 54'
FH	21	(England) Alex King		(substituted in) 54'
CE	22	(England) Ayoola Erinle
Coach:
(England) Shaun Edwards

== See also ==
- 2005–06 English Premiership (rugby union)
- 2005–06 Celtic League
