= Celtic Cup (rugby union) =

British and Irish competition 2003–2005

- Sport: Rugby union
- Instituted: 2003
- Inaugural season: 2003–04
- Ceased: 2004–05
- Number of teams: 12 (2003–04), 8 (2004–05)
- Nations: Ireland; Scotland; Wales
- Holders: Munster (2004–05)
- Most titles: Munster; Ulster (1 title)
- Broadcast partner: BBC
- Related competition: Celtic League

The Celtic Cup was a rugby union cup competition featuring regional and provincial teams from Ireland, Scotland and Wales that ran for two seasons between 2003 and 2005. The first edition of the competition was won by Ulster and the second by Munster, both from Ireland. After the Welsh teams agreed to join the English Premiership clubs to form the Anglo-Welsh Cup for the 2005–06 season, the Celtic Cup was discontinued. A separate competition under the same name was inaugurated in 2018 for Welsh and Irish development sides.

== Formation ==
Following the inception of Welsh regional rugby ahead of the 2003–04 season, the format of the Celtic League tournament was changed so that each team would play each other twice, home and away, with the side that accumulated the most points during the season winning the title. This was a change from previous seasons, which culminated in a knock-out format competition leading to a final. In a bid to attract broadcasters, sponsors and the public by having a "showpiece" final, the Irish, Scottish and Welsh unions agreed to launch a new knock-out cup competition, naming it the Celtic Cup.

== 2003–04 season ==
In the inaugural season, the competition was contested by all 12 Celtic League sides and ran concurrently with the league on four weekends between September and December 2003. The tournament was a knock-out format, played over one leg with the first team drawn in each fixture hosting the match. Due to the number of teams competing, eight teams contested the first round in mid-September, while four teams (Edinburgh, Munster, Ulster and Cardiff Blues) were given byes to the quarter-finals, where they would meet the winners from the first round. The winning teams from the first round were Connacht, Glasgow, Leinster and the Llanelli Scarlets.

The quarter-finals took place on the first weekend of October, with Edinburgh, Glasgow and Connacht winning their games. Ulster and Leinster drew their game 23–23 after extra time, but Ulster progressed having scored three tries to Leinster's two. The semi-finals took place in mid-November and saw both the away teams win, as Ulster beat Glasgow and Edinburgh beat Connacht. The final was played at Murrayfield Stadium in Edinburgh on 20 December 2003, and saw Ulster beat Edinburgh 27–21 to win the Celtic Cup.

Preliminary round
20 September – Llanelli
(Wales) Llanelli Scarlets	40
(Wales) NG Dragons	6
19 September – Galway
(Ireland) Connacht	26
(Scotland) Borders	21
20 September – Bridgend
(Wales) Celtic Warriors	9
(Scotland) Glasgow	19
20 September – Dublin
(Ireland) Leinster	35
(Wales) Ospreys	21

Quarter-finals
3 October – Llanelli
(Wales) Llanelli Scarlets	12
(Ireland) Connacht	14
3 October – Edinburgh
(Scotland) Edinburgh	33
(Wales) Cardiff Blues	16
3 October – Glasgow
(Scotland) Glasgow	18
(Ireland) Munster	14
3 October – Belfast
(Ireland) Ulster	23 (3t)
(Ireland) Leinster	23 (2t)

Semi-finals
15 November – Galway
(Ireland) Connacht	25
(Scotland) Edinburgh	26
15 November – Glasgow
(Scotland) Glasgow	13
(Ireland) Ulster	20

Final
20 December – Edinburgh
(Scotland) Edinburgh	21
(Ireland) Ulster	27

=== Final ===
20 December 2003
14:30 GMT

Edinburgh (Scotland)	21–27	(Ireland) Ulster
Try: Webster; Lee; Blair; Con: Paterson (3/3)	Report	Try: Best; Frost; Con: Humphreys (1/2); Pen: Humphreys (5)

Murrayfield, Edinburgh
Attendance: 17,174
Referee: Nigel Williams (Wales)

== 2004–05 season ==
The format of the competition was changed for the 2004–05 season. It was moved to April and May to run after the conclusion of the Celtic League competition, and only the top eight teams from the league took part, again in a straight knockout format. The quarter-final fixtures were based on the teams' finishing positions in the Celtic League, with the league winners Neath-Swansea Ospreys hosting the eighth-placed side Ulster, second-placed Munster hosting seventh-placed Edinburgh, third-placed Leinster hosting sixth-placed Glasgow and fourth-placed Newport Gwent Dragons hosting fifth-placed Llanelli Scarlets. In this way, the tournament was similar to a play-off system, although the Celtic League and Celtic Cup remained trophies in their own right.

Rather than continuing with the automatic home advantage for the highest-seeded teams remaining in the semi-finals, the fixtures were instead decided by a draw. Munster beat Leinster in Dublin, and the Scarlets won at home to the Ospreys. The final took place on 14 May at Lansdowne Road and saw Munster beat the Scarlets 27–16 to win the second Celtic Cup.

Quarter-finals
22 April – Dublin
(Ireland) Leinster	33
(Scotland) Glasgow	24
22 April – Limerick
(Ireland) Munster	24
(Scotland) Edinburgh	14
22 April – Newport
(Wales) NG Dragons	19
(Wales) Llanelli Scarlets	49
22 April – Swansea
(Wales) Ospreys	23
(Ireland) Ulster	16

Semi-finals
29 April – Dublin
(Ireland) Leinster	17
(Ireland) Munster	23
29 April – Llanelli
(Wales) Llanelli Scarlets	23
(Wales) Ospreys	15

Final
6 May – Dublin
(Ireland) Munster	27
(Wales) Llanelli Scarlets	16

=== Final ===
14 May 2005
17:30 IST

Munster (Ireland)	27–16	(Wales) Llanelli Scarlets
Try: Horgan 6' c O'Gara 22' c Mullins 76' c Con: O'Gara (3/3); Pen: O'Gara 39'; Drop: O'Gara 40'	Report	Try: Phillips 34' c Con: C. Thomas (1/1); Pen: C. Thomas (3) 12', 42', 59'

Lansdowne Road, Dublin
Attendance: 11,500
Referee: Joel Jutge (France)

FB	15	(Ireland) Shaun Payne
RW	14	(England) Paul Devlin	(substituted off) 64'
OC	13	(Ireland) Mike Mullins
IC	12	(Ireland) Rob Henderson
LW	11	(Ireland) Anthony Horgan
FH	10	(Ireland) Ronan O'Gara
SH	9	(Ireland) Peter Stringer
N8	8	(Ireland) Anthony Foley (c)
OF	7	(Ireland) David Wallace
BF	6	(Ireland) Alan Quinlan
RL	5	(Ireland) Paul O'Connell
LL	4	(Ireland) Donncha O'Callaghan
TP	3	(Ireland) John Hayes
HK	2	(Ireland) Frankie Sheahan
LP	1	(Ireland) Marcus Horan	(substituted off) 28'
Substitutions:
HK	16	(Ireland) Jerry Flannery
PR	17	(Scotland) Gordon McIlwham	(substituted in) 28'
LK	18	(Ireland) Trevor Hogan
FL	19	(Ireland) Denis Leamy	(substituted in) 64'
SH	20	(Ireland) Mike Prendergast
FH	21	(Ireland) Paul Burke
CE	22	(England) James Storey
Coach:
(Australia) Alan Gaffney

FB	15	(Wales) Barry Davies
RW	14	(Wales) Garan Evans
OC	13	(Wales) Matthew Watkins
IC	12	(Wales) Tal Selley
LW	11	(Tonga) Aisea Havili	(substituted off) 55'
FH	10	(Wales) Ceiron Thomas
SH	9	(Wales) Mike Phillips
N8	8	(Wales) Andy Powell	(substituted off) 55'
OF	7	(Wales) Gavin Thomas
BF	6	(Ireland) Simon Easterby (c)
RL	5	(Wales) Chris Wyatt	(substituted off) 64'
LL	4	(Wales) Vernon Cooper
TP	3	(Wales) John Davies
HK	2	(Wales) Matthew Rees	(substituted off) 70'
LP	1	(Wales) Phil John
Substitutions:
PR	16	(Wales) David Maddocks
HK	17	(Wales) Aled Gravelle	(substituted in) 70'
LK	18	(Wales) Adam Jones	(substituted in) 64'
FL	19	(Wales) Gavin Quinnell	(substituted in) 55'
SH	20	(Wales) Chris McDonald
FH	21	(Wales) Gareth Bowen
WG	22	(Tonga) Salesi Finau	(substituted in) 55'
Coach:
(Wales) Gareth Jenkins

== Demise ==
At the end of the 2004–05 season, the Welsh regions signed a deal to join the English Premiership clubs in an Anglo-Welsh Cup competition from the 2005–06 season. With clashing fixtures in the two competitions, the fallout led to the Irish and Scottish sides withdrawing from Celtic competition at the end of May. Talks between the three countries in June led to an agreement to reinstate the Celtic League, but not the Celtic Cup.

For the 2009–10 season, the Celtic League adopted a play-off format similar to that used for the 2004–05 Celtic Cup, but involving the top four teams in the league at the end of the season rather than the top eight. However the Celtic Cup name was not revived and the winners of the play-offs were instead crowned the overall Celtic League champions.
