= 2006–07 Llanelli Scarlets season =

Llanelli Scarlets
- 2006–07 season
- Chairman: Stuart Gallacher
- Head coach: Phil Davies
- Celtic League: 4th
- Anglo-Welsh Cup: Pool stage, 3rd
- Heineken Cup: Semi-finals
- Highest home attendance: 10,800 vs Munster (30 March 2007)
- Lowest home attendance: 5,108 vs Edinburgh (29 April 2007)

The 2006–07 season was the fourth season in the history of the Llanelli Scarlets rugby union team. They competed in the Celtic League, in which they finished in fourth place, as well as the Anglo-Welsh Cup and Heineken Cup. They won just one of their three Anglo-Welsh Cup matches and were knocked out in the pool stage, but despite being drawn in the same pool as Toulouse for a third year in a row, they won all six of their pool matches and qualified for the quarter-finals as the second seed, giving them a home tie against Munster. A 24–15 win at Stradey Park set up a semi-final away to Leicester Tigers, but although they led 17–16 early in the second half, they ended up losing 33–17.

== Celtic League ==
=== Matches ===
Date	Opponents	H / A	Result F–A	Scorers	Attendance
2 September 2006	Ulster	A	16–31	Try: Daniel; Conversion: S. Jones; Penalties: S. Jones (3)	8,265
8 September 2006	Glasgow Warriors	H	31–17	Tries: Daniel (3), Peel, Gav. Evans; Conversions: S. Jones (3)	6,366
12 September 2006	Newport Gwent Dragons	A	23–22	Tries: Gav. Evans (2), C. Thomas; Conversion: S. Jones; Penalties: S. Jones (2)	5,574
15 September 2006	Connacht	A	37–15	Tries: Daniel, Easterby, King (2); Conversions: S. Jones (4); Penalties: S. Jones (3)	1,765
23 September 2006	Leinster	H	33–21	Tries: James (2), Afeaki, King; Conversions: S. Jones (2); Penalties: S. Jones (3)	6,721
5 November 2006	Munster	H	25–12	Tries: James, Manu, Daniel, B. Davies; Conversion: C. Thomas; Penalty: C. Thomas	5,563
10 November 2006	Border Reivers	A	19–13	Try: Mills; Conversion: C. Thomas; Penalties: C. Thomas (4)	1,103
26 December 2006	Ospreys	A	24–50	Tries: Penalty try, Peel, Gav. Evans; Conversions: C. Thomas (3); Penalty: C. Thomas	20,520
1 January 2007	Cardiff Blues	A	10–29	Try: Penalty try Conversion: C. Thomas; Penalty: C. Thomas	10,480
5 January 2007	Edinburgh	A	14–24	Try: Daniel; Penalties: S. Jones (3)	2,137
26 January 2007	Leinster	A	34–44	Tries: Stoddart, King, Stuart-Smith, James, B. Davies; Conversions: C. Thomas, B. Davies; Penalty: C. Thomas	5,890
18 February 2007	Glasgow Warriors	A	14–30	Try: D. Jones; Penalties: C. Thomas (3)	1,825
3 March 2007	Ulster	H	17–11	Try: B. Davies; Penalties: C. Thomas (4)	5,641
23 March 2007 (Note: Postponed from 22 December 2006 due to fog)	Newport Gwent Dragons	H	35–11	Tries: C. Thomas, B. Davies, Bater, M. Jones, James; Conversions: C. Thomas (2); Penalties: C. Thomas (2)	6,320
6 April 2007	Border Reivers	H	53–11	Tries: MacLeod, Rees (2), James, S. Jones, M. Jones, B. Davies, L. Davies, Owens; Conversions: S. Jones (4)	5,437
14 April 2007	Munster	A	0–20		6,500
24 April 2007	Ospreys	H	6–19	Penalties: S. Jones (2)	10,102
29 April 2007	Edinburgh	H	42–17	Tries: S. Jones, Watkins (2), King, MacLeod, I. Thomas; Conversions: S. Jones (5), C. Thomas	5,108
5 May 2007	Cardiff Blues	H	38–10	Tries: Watkins (2), B. Davies (2); Conversions: S. Jones (3); Penalties: S. Jones (4)	7,506
11 May 2007	Connacht	H	19–10	Tries: C. Thomas (2), Gav. Evans; Conversions: C. Thomas (2)	5,204

=== Table ===
Pos	Team	Pld	W	D	L	PF	PA	PD	TF	TA	TBP	LBP	Pts
2	(Wales) Cardiff Blues	20	13	1	6	447	327	+120	53	33	6	3	63
3	(Ireland) Leinster	20	12	1	7	472	376	+96	54	37	7	4	61
4	(Wales) Llanelli Scarlets	20	12	0	8	490	417	+73	61	41	9	0	57
5	(Ireland) Ulster	20	11	1	8	423	310	+113	45	31	4	5	55
6	(Ireland) Munster	20	12	0	8	379	294	+85	37	31	3	3	54

== Anglo-Welsh Cup ==
=== Pool stage ===
Date	Opponents	H / A	Result F–A	Scorers	Attendance	Pool position
1 October 2006	Harlequins	H	26–7	Tries: Daniel, Afeaki, B. Davies, N. Thomas; Conversions: S. Jones	6,148	1st
6 October 2006	Newcastle Falcons	A	9–25	Penalties: C. Thomas (2), B. Davies	4,368	2nd
2 December 2006	Sale Sharks	A	5–21	Try: I. Thomas	8,339	3rd

Pos	Team	Pld	W	D	L	PF	PA	PD	TF	TA	TBP	LBP	Pts
1	(England) Sale Sharks	3	3	0	0	77	37	+40	8	6	0	0	12
2	(England) Newcastle Falcons	3	2	0	1	51	55	−4	7	5	0	0	8
3	(Wales) Llanelli Scarlets	3	1	0	2	40	53	−13	5	6	1	0	5
4	(England) Harlequins	3	0	0	3	52	75	−23	7	10	1	2	3

== Heineken Cup ==
=== Pool stage ===
Date	Opponents	H / A	Result F–A	Scorers	Attendance	Pool position
9 October 2006	London Irish	A	32–25	Tries: James 33' c, Easterby 46' c, M. Jones 50' m, I. Thomas 58' c Conversions: S. Jones (3); Penalties: S. Jones (2) 19', 62'	9,659	1st
27 October 2006	Ulster	H	21–15	Tries: King 4' m, M. Jones 50' c Conversion: S. Jones; Penalties: S. Jones (3) 28', 40+6', 71'	8,914	1st
9 December 2006	Toulouse	H	20–19	Tries: MacLeod 3' c, Easterby 51' c Conversions: S. Jones (2); Penalties: S. Jones (2)	9,383	1st
16 December 2006	Toulouse	A	41–34	Tries: James 38' c, Daniel (2) 50' c, 66' c, B. Davies 53' c, N. Thomas 80+3' c Conversions: S. Jones (5); Penalties: S. Jones (2) 2', 56'	16,880	1st
13 January 2007	Ulster	A	35–11	Tries: Popham 35' c, King 57' c, Stoddart 63' c, Peel 79' c, G. Thomas 80+1' c Conversions: S. Jones (5)	12,278	1st
21 January 2007	London Irish	H	20–16	Tries: Peel 21' c, James 30' c Conversions: S. Jones (2); Penalties: S. Jones (2) 5', 74'	8,035	1st

Pos	Team	P	W	D	L	TF	TA	TD	PF	PA	PD	TBP	LBP	Pts
1	(Wales) Llanelli Scarlets (2)	6	6	0	0	20	12	8	169	120	+49	3	0	27
2	(France) Toulouse	6	3	0	3	18	17	1	147	145	+2	3	2	17
3	(Ireland) Ulster	6	2	0	4	10	15	−5	111	129	−18	1	1	10
4	(England) London Irish	6	1	0	5	15	19	−4	124	157	−33	2	3	9

=== Knockout stage ===
Date	Round	Opponents	H / A	Result F–A	Scorers	Attendance
30 March 2007	Quarter-final	Munster	H	24–15	Tries: James 5' c, G. Thomas 40+4' c, B. Davies 73' c Conversions: S. Jones (3); Penalty: B. Davies 40'	10,800
21 April 2007	Semi-final	Leicester Tigers	A	17–33	Tries: M. Jones 37' c, Rees 50' c Conversions: S. Jones (2); Penalty: S. Jones 10'	30,121
