= Ysgol y Strade =

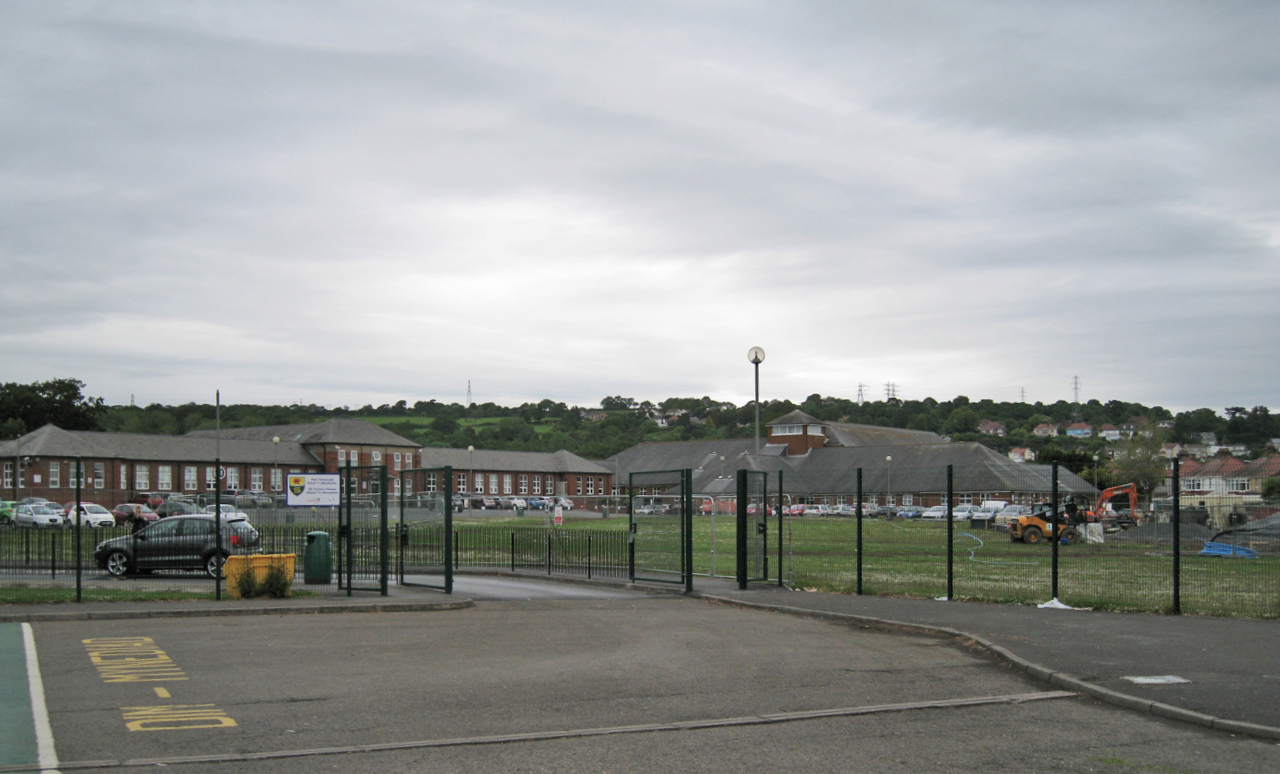
- The view from outside the school grounds during its extension.
- Carmarthenshire, SA15 4DL; Wales, United Kingdom

Information
- School type: Secondary & Sixth Form
- Motto: Nid da lle gellir gwell ([it is] not good where capable of [being] better)
- Religious affiliation: Christianity
- Established: 1977
- Authority: Carmarthenshire County Council
- School code: 6694052
- Head teacher: Geoff Evans
- Secondary years taught: Year 7 to Year 11
- Age range: 11-18
- Enrollment: 1253 (2025)
- Student to teacher ratio: 17.3
- Language: Welsh
- Houses: Gwenllian, Madog, Buddug and Rhodri
- Sports: Rugby
- Budget: £5717 per pupil (2025)
- Website: http://www.ysgolystrade.cymru
- Last updated: 2023-06-05

Ysgol Gyfun y Strade (Welsh pronunciation: [ˈəsɡɔl ˈɡəvɨn ə ˈstradɛ]) (often known as Y Strade) is a Welsh-medium comprehensive school and sixth form in the town of Llanelli, Wales. It opened in September 1977 as a mixed gender school. In 2025, there were 1,253 pupils enrolled at the school.

The school's motto is "Nid da lle gellir gwell" — literally, (it is) not good where capable of (being) better, i.e. never settle for second-best; or, there is always room for improvement.

The school has a successful rugby team which competes in the Rosslyn Park National School Sevens annually.

The arts department within the school has also achieved many accolades throughout the nation. The choir have featured numerous times on the BBC in competitions such as Songs of Praise. Many awards have also been won in The National Eisteddfod with recitation groups, choirs, drama performances, solo and duet singing, and public speaking.

== History ==
The school was opened in 1977 as a mixed bilingual comprehensive. The current headteacher is Geoff Evans; he took over from the previous headteacher, Heather Lewis, in 2017. Lewis became headmistress in 2009.

=== Extensions and Improvements ===
The school featured in S4C's Hip neu Sgip?: Yn erbyn y cloc in 2011, in a cafeteria makeover which took place at the school in September 2010.

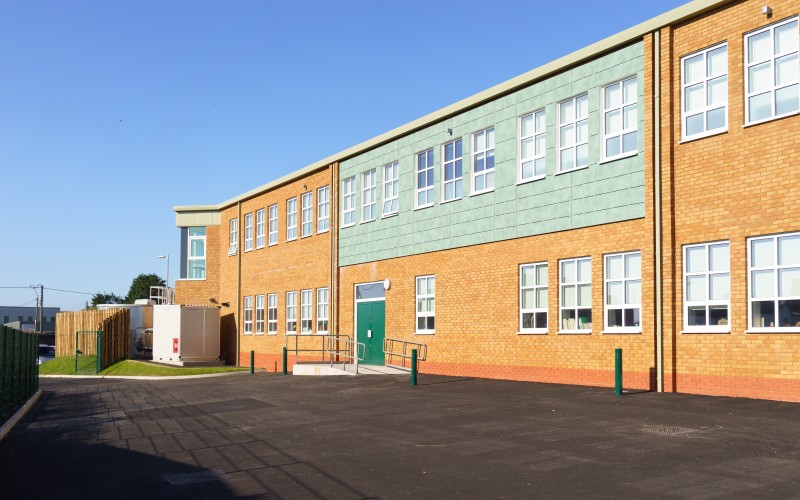
The rear of the school's extension in 2015

In 2015, a standalone extension for the Science and Design & Technology departments was completed. As a part of the project, the existing facilities used by the departments mentioned were converted and refurbished into classrooms for departments including music, media, and drama. A new lounge and study area for the school's sixth form was also introduced. In total the project cost £8.245 million, with the Welsh Government footing 50% of the investment as a part of its 21st Century Schools and Colleges Programme. Carmarthenshire County Council contributed the rest through its Modernising Education Programme.

As a part of the Welsh Government's 'Cymraeg 2050' strategy, Jeremy Miles, the Minister for Education and Welsh Language, announced in 2022 that a £4.4 million investment would be dedicated to a new 'Welsh Language Immersion Centre' at Ysgol Gyfun y Strade. The investment also seeks to increase the school's capacity by 228.

=== COVID-19 Response ===
The UK's response to the pandemic meant that Ysgol y Strade, like all schools, was closed until the end of June 2020. From then, many schools in Wales reopened from the end of June until the summer to trial how they would reopen in the next academic year. Shortly after reopening for the next academic year, pupils in Year 10 were forced into self-isolation after a pupil tested positive for the virus. Similar cases plagued the school throughout the pandemic.

The school was praised for introducing a "Botwm Becso" ("Concern Button") during the pandemic. The button, placed on the school's website, allowed pupils to voice their concerns directly to the school's assistant head teacher in a confidential manner. The assistant head teacher would then decide how best to support the pupil. The scheme was highlighted in Estyn's 20-21 Annual Report.

== Extracurricular activities ==
=== Rugby ===
The school is notable for its rugby offering. It competes in union, league, and sevens competitions. In 2023, the school's team claimed victory over previous winner Ysgol Gyfun Ystalyfera to win the WRU's under 18s Welsh cup. Other competitions include the school's defeat to Llanishen in 2015 in the same competition.

=== Arts ===
External videos
- Ysgol y Strade performing on S4C's Dechrau Canu Dechrau Canmol
- https://www.youtube.com/watch?v=QFKgYmjZOXM

The school frequently competes in the National Eisteddfod, usually with its choir, though it's competed in other competitions too, including recitation groups, drama performances, solo and duet singing, and public speaking. The choir has also competed in Songs of Praise's School Choir of the Year, where it appeared in the semifinals in 2013 and finished as runners up in 2012 and in 2018.

In 2013, the school performed an original musical Grav that was based on the life of late rugby star Ray Gravell. The musical was completely in Welsh and performed by pupils from the school of all ages. It attracted a large audience throughout South Wales; resulting in a shortened version being performed in the National Eisteddfod the following year in Llanelli.

== Notable former pupils ==
- Josh Adams, Wales and British and Irish Lions rugby player.
- Liam Davies, Scarlets rugby player.
- Garan Evans, Scarlets and Wales rugby player.
- Gavin Evans, Scarlets and Wales rugby player.
- Trystan Gravelle, actor
- Emyr Huws, Wales National Football Team midfielder.
- Phil John, Scarlets rugby player.
- Ceiron Thomas, Scarlets rugby player.
- Imogen Thomas, former Miss Wales and Big Brother (TV series) celebrity.
- Steff Evans, Scarlets and Wales rugby player.
- Nikara Jenkins, Welsh gymnast.
- Richard Lewis, Chief Constable of Dyfed-Powys Police.

== Notable former teachers ==
- Tudur Dylan Jones, two-time winner of the Eisteddfod chair and author, taught Welsh at the school.
