= 2004–05 Celtic League =

Rugby competition

- Countries: Ireland; Scotland; Wales
- Champions: (Wales) Neath-Swansea Ospreys (1st title)
- Runners-up: (Ireland) Munster
- Matches played: 110
- Attendance: 470,446 (average 4,277 per match)
- Tries scored: 462 (average 4.2 per match)
- Top point scorer: Gavin Henson (Neath-Swansea Ospreys) (175 points)
- Top try scorer: Kevin Morgan (Newport Gwent Dragons) (12 tries)

Official website
- pro14rugby.org

The 2004–05 Celtic League was the fourth Celtic League season, and the second following the introduction of regional rugby in Wales. It involved Irish, Scottish and Welsh rugby union clubs. The restructured Celtic League saw the Welsh regional side the Neath-Swansea Ospreys finish top of the table to take the title.

== Teams ==
Location of 2004–05 Celtic League teams in Great Britain and Ireland.
Winners; 2nd–4th place; Other teams.

Team	Stadium	Capacity	City, Area
(Scotland) Borders	Netherdale (Note: Border Reivers also played one home game at The Greenyards.)	6,000	Galashiels, Scotland
(Wales) Cardiff Blues	Cardiff Arms Park	12,500	Cardiff, Wales
(Ireland) Connacht	Galway Sportsgrounds (Note: Connacht also played one of their matches at Dubarry Park in Athlone.)	5,500	Galway, Republic of Ireland
(Scotland) Edinburgh	Murrayfield Stadium	67,800 (Note: Although Murrayfield's full capacity is 67,800, only the lower section of the West Stand, with a capacity of 12,464, is generally opened for Edinburgh fixtures.)	Edinburgh, Scotland
(Scotland) Glasgow Warriors	Hughenden Stadium (Note: Glasgow Warriors also played one home game at Old Anniesland.)	6,000	Glasgow, Scotland
(Ireland) Leinster	Donnybrook Stadium (Note: Leinster also played two of their home games at Lansdowne Road.)	6,000	Dublin, Republic of Ireland
(Wales) Llanelli Scarlets	Stradey Park (Note: Llanelli Scarlets played one of their home games at the Racecourse Ground in Wrexham.)	10,800	Llanelli, Wales
(Ireland) Munster	Thomond Park; Musgrave Park	13,200; 8,300	Limerick, Republic of Ireland; Cork, Republic of Ireland
(Wales) Neath-Swansea Ospreys	St Helen's; The Gnoll	4,500; 6,000	Swansea, Wales; Neath, Wales
(Wales) Newport Gwent Dragons	Rodney Parade	12,000	Newport, Wales
(Ireland) Ulster	Ravenhill	12,800	Belfast, Northern Ireland

== Table ==
Pos.	Team	Pld	W	D	L	PF	PA	PD	TF	TA	TBP	LBP	Pts
1	(Wales) Neath-Swansea Ospreys	20	16	1	3	508	267	+241	53	27	7	3	76
2	(Ireland) Munster	20	15	1	4	470	331	+139	54	33	6	1	69
3	(Ireland) Leinster	20	12	1	7	455	350	+105	46	32	4	3	57
4	(Wales) Newport Gwent Dragons	20	11	0	9	381	436	−55	39	43	4	2	50
5	(Wales) Llanelli Scarlets	20	9	0	11	402	446	−44	48	42	7	3	46
6	(Scotland) Glasgow Warriors	20	8	1	11	465	466	−1	40	58	4	7	45
7	(Scotland) Edinburgh	20	9	0	11	409	407	+2	47	40	4	4	44
8	(Ireland) Ulster	20	9	0	11	363	387	−24	37	34	2	5	43
9	(Wales) Cardiff Blues	20	8	1	11	350	404	−54	35	41	2	4	40
10	(Ireland) Connacht	20	7	1	12	317	407	−90	32	46	2	5	37
11	(Scotland) Borders	20	3	0	17	337	556	−219	31	66	2	4	18
Under the standard bonus point system, points are awarded as follows: 4 points for a win; 2 points for a draw; 1 bonus point for scoring 4 tries (or more) (Try bonus); 1 bonus point for losing by 7 points (or fewer) (Losing bonus)
Source: RaboDirect PRO12

== Fixtures ==
=== Round 1 ===
3 September 2004
19:05

Neath-Swansea Ospreys (Wales)	34–17	(Ireland) Munster
	Report

St Helen's
Attendance: 4,052

3 September 2004
19:30

Borders (Scotland)	15–26	(Wales) Llanelli Scarlets
	Report

Netherdale
Attendance: 2,000

4 September 2004
14:30

Connacht (Ireland)	31–15	(Scotland) Glasgow Warriors
	Report

Sportsground
Attendance: 2,137

4 September 2004
14:30

Edinburgh (Scotland)	16–17	(Ireland) Ulster
	Report

Murrayfield
Attendance: 2,609

5 September 2004
17:15

Leinster (Ireland)	9–9	(Wales) Cardiff Blues
	Report

Donnybrook
Attendance: 3,256

=== Round 2 ===
10 September 2004
19:05

Llanelli Scarlets (Wales)	6–23	(Wales) Neath-Swansea Ospreys
	Report

Stradey Park
Attendance: 8,173

11 September 2004
15:00

Borders (Scotland)	7–10	(Scotland) Glasgow Warriors
	Report

The Greenyards
Attendance: 1,250

11 September 2004
17:15

Ulster (Ireland)	15–26	(Ireland) Leinster
	Report

Ravenhill
Attendance: 6,100

11 September 2004
17:30

Cardiff Blues (Wales)	18–8	(Wales) Newport Gwent Dragons
	Report

Cardiff Arms Park
Attendance: 7,401

11 September 2004
20:05

Munster (Ireland)	27–27	(Ireland) Connacht
	Report

Musgrave Park
Attendance: 4,200

=== Round 3 ===
17 September 2004
19:05

Newport Gwent Dragons (Wales)	15–0	(Wales) Llanelli Scarlets
	Report

Rodney Parade
Attendance: 5,182

18 September 2004
14:30

Connacht (Ireland)	13–19	(Ireland) Ulster
	Report

Sportsground
Attendance: 1,300

18 September 2004
17:15

Leinster (Ireland)	17–15	(Ireland) Munster
	Report

Donnybrook
Attendance: 6,500

18 September 2004
17:30

Neath-Swansea Ospreys (Wales)	39–3	(Wales) Cardiff Blues
	Report

The Gnoll
Attendance: 5,174

18 September 2004
19:30

Glasgow Warriors (Scotland)	12–10	(Scotland) Edinburgh
	Report

Old Anniesland
Attendance: 2,117

=== Round 4 ===
24 September 2004
19:30

Glasgow Warriors (Scotland)	29–38	(Wales) Newport Gwent Dragons
	Report

Hughenden
Attendance: 1,918

24 September 2004
19:30

Leinster (Ireland)	50–13	(Scotland) Borders
	Report

Donnybrook
Attendance: 2,800

24 September 2004
19:35

Cardiff Blues (Wales)	31–6	(Ireland) Connacht
	Report

Cardiff Arms Park
Attendance: 3,867

25 September 2004
17:15

Ulster (Ireland)	24–37	(Wales) Neath-Swansea Ospreys
	Report

Ravenhill
Attendance: 5,638

25 September 2004
17:30

Llanelli Scarlets (Wales)	37–16	(Scotland) Edinburgh
	Report

Stradey Park
Attendance: 7,648

=== Round 5 ===
1 October 2004
19:05

Newport Gwent Dragons (Wales)	34–13	(Ireland) Leinster
	Report

Rodney Parade
Attendance: 5,262

2 October 2004
14:30

Connacht (Ireland)	29–27	(Scotland) Borders
	Report

Sportsground
Attendance: 1,650

2 October 2004
15:00

Edinburgh (Scotland)	35–16	(Wales) Cardiff Blues
	Report

Murrayfield
Attendance: 1,657

2 October 2004
17:30

Neath-Swansea Ospreys (Wales)	40–17	(Scotland) Glasgow Warriors
	Report

St Helen's
Attendance: 4,086

3 October 2004
17:15

Munster (Ireland)	19–13	(Wales) Llanelli Scarlets
	Report

Thomond Park
Attendance: 9,000

=== Round 6 ===
8 October 2004
19:05

Ulster (Ireland)	21–28	(Wales) Newport Gwent Dragons
	Report

Ravenhill
Attendance: 8,145

8 October 2004
19:30

Borders (Scotland)	15–23	(Wales) Neath-Swansea Ospreys
	Report

Netherdale
Attendance: 1,500

9 October 2004
17:30

Llanelli Scarlets (Wales)	21–29	(Ireland) Connacht
	Report

Stradey Park
Attendance: 6,281

9 October 2004
19:30

Glasgow Warriors (Scotland)	26–28	(Ireland) Munster
	Report

Hughenden
Attendance: 2,625

10 October 2004
17:15

Leinster (Ireland)	35–13	(Scotland) Edinburgh
	Report

Donnybrook
Attendance: 4,520

=== Round 7 ===
15 October 2004
19:05

Neath-Swansea Ospreys (Wales)	11–3	(Ireland) Leinster
	Report

St Helen's
Attendance: 4,829

15 October 2004
19:30

Borders (Scotland)	6–14	(Wales) Newport Gwent Dragons
	Report

Netherdale
Attendance: 1,200

16 October 2004
14:30

Connacht (Ireland)	24–35	(Scotland) Edinburgh
	Report

Sportsground
Attendance: 1,760

16 October 2004
17:15

Munster (Ireland)	49–18	(Wales) Cardiff Blues
	Report

Thomond Park
Attendance: 7,500

16 October 2004
19:15

Glasgow Warriors (Scotland)	34–20	(Ireland) Ulster
	Report

Hughenden
Attendance: 3,469

=== Round 8 ===
5 November 2004
19:05

Newport Gwent Dragons (Wales)	33–29	(Wales) Neath-Swansea Ospreys
	Report

Rodney Parade
Attendance: 5,227

5 November 2004
19:30

Glasgow Warriors (Scotland)	36–22	(Scotland) Borders
	Report

Hughenden
Attendance: 1,765

5 November 2004
19:30

Leinster (Ireland)	18–9	(Ireland) Connacht
	Report

Donnybrook
Attendance: 5,200

6 November 2004
17:15

Ulster (Ireland)	3–24	(Ireland) Munster
	Report

Ravenhill
Attendance: 6,402

7 November 2004
15:00

Cardiff Blues (Wales)	14–10	(Wales) Llanelli Scarlets
	Report

Cardiff Arms Park
Attendance: 4,832

=== Round 9 ===
12 November 2004
19:30

Edinburgh (Scotland)	15–31	(Wales) Neath-Swansea Ospreys
	Report

Murrayfield
Attendance: 2,342

12 November 2004
19:30

Borders (Scotland)	19–20	(Ireland) Ulster
	Report

Netherdale
Attendance: 1,500

13 November 2004
17:30

Cardiff Blues (Wales)	24–19	(Scotland) Glasgow Warriors
	Report

Cardiff Arms Park
Attendance: 2,799

13 November 2004
20:05

Munster (Ireland)	25–16	(Wales) Newport Gwent Dragons
	Report

Musgrave Park
Attendance: 3,850

14 November 2004
17:30

Llanelli Scarlets (Wales)	24–22	(Ireland) Leinster
	Report

Racecourse Ground
Attendance: 4,200

=== Round 10 ===
19 November 2004
18:45

Munster (Ireland)	45–8	(Scotland) Borders
	Report

Musgrave Park
Attendance: 4,250

19 November 2004
19:05

Newport Gwent Dragons (Wales)	16–17	(Scotland) Edinburgh
	Report

Rodney Parade
Attendance: 4,531

19 November 2004
19:30

Glasgow Warriors (Scotland)	40–29	(Wales) Llanelli Scarlets
	Report

Hughenden
Attendance: 1,751

19 November 2004
19:30

Ulster (Ireland)	30–14	(Wales) Cardiff Blues
	Report

Ravenhill
Attendance: 5,705

21 November 2004
17:15

Neath-Swansea Ospreys (Wales)	9–10	(Ireland) Connacht
	Report

The Gnoll
Attendance: 3,528

=== Round 11 ===
26 November 2004
19:30

Edinburgh (Scotland)	0–11	(Ireland) Munster
	Report

Murrayfield
Attendance: 2,496

26 November 2004
19:30

Leinster (Ireland)	22–16	(Scotland) Glasgow Warriors
	Report

Donnybrook
Attendance: 4,370

26 November 2004
19:30

Borders (Scotland)	35–25	(Wales) Cardiff Blues
	Report

Netherdale
Attendance: 900

28 November 2004
13:05

Connacht (Ireland)	19–14	(Wales) Newport Gwent Dragons
	Report

Sportsground
Attendance: 1,350

28 November 2004
18:00

Llanelli Scarlets (Wales)	22–9	(Ireland) Ulster
	Report

Stradey Park
Attendance: 5,334

=== Round 12 ===
17 December 2004
19:05

Llanelli Scarlets (Wales)	39–22	(Scotland) Borders
	Report

Stradey Park
Attendance: 4,129

17 December 2004
19:30

Glasgow Warriors (Scotland)	35–0	(Ireland) Connacht
	Report

Hughenden
Attendance: 1,423

17 December 2004
19:30

Ulster (Ireland)	36–34	(Scotland) Edinburgh
	Report

Ravenhill
Attendance: 5,858

18 December 2004
17:30

Cardiff Blues (Wales)	6–15	(Ireland) Leinster
	Report

Cardiff Arms Park
Attendance: 3,300

18 December 2004
20:05

Munster (Ireland)	13–9	(Wales) Neath-Swansea Ospreys
	Report

Musgrave Park
Attendance: 3,500

=== Round 13 ===
26 December 2004
14:30

Neath-Swansea Ospreys (Wales)	28–7	(Wales) Llanelli Scarlets
	Report

The Gnoll
Attendance: 10,280

27 December 2004
14:00

Connacht (Ireland)	0–3	(Ireland) Munster
	Report

Sportsground
Attendance: 4,500

27 December 2004
15:00

Edinburgh (Scotland)	18–12	(Scotland) Glasgow Warriors
	Report

Murrayfield
Attendance: 3,932

27 December 2004
16:00

Newport Gwent Dragons (Wales)	25–21	(Wales) Cardiff Blues
	Report

Rodney Parade
Attendance: 10,500

27 December 2004
17:05

Leinster (Ireland)	9–8	(Ireland) Ulster
	Report

Donnybrook
Attendance: 5,500

=== Round 14 ===
31 December 2004
15:00

Borders (Scotland)	19–10	(Scotland) Edinburgh
	Report

Netherdale
Attendance: 2,200

1 January 2005
14:30

Cardiff Blues (Wales)	9–15	(Wales) Neath-Swansea Ospreys
	Report

Cardiff Arms Park
Attendance: 8,206

1 January 2005
16:00

Ulster (Ireland)	23–14	(Ireland) Connacht
	Report

Ravenhill
Attendance: 7,900

1 January 2005
17:30

Llanelli Scarlets (Wales)	35–26	(Wales) Newport Gwent Dragons
	Report

Stradey Park
Attendance: 6,372

1 January 2005
17:30

Munster (Ireland)	19–13	(Ireland) Leinster
	Report

Musgrave Park
Attendance: 8,000

=== Round 15 ===
21 January 2005
19:05

Neath-Swansea Ospreys (Wales)	22–21	(Ireland) Ulster
	Report

St Helen's
Attendance: 4,142

21 January 2005
19:30

Edinburgh (Scotland)	23–0	(Wales) Llanelli Scarlets
	Report

Murrayfield
Attendance: 1,628

22 January 2005
14:00

Connacht (Ireland)	8–18	(Wales) Cardiff Blues
	Report

Sportsground
Attendance: 1,750

22 January 2005
14:30

Newport Gwent Dragons (Wales)	21–16	(Scotland) Glasgow Warriors
	Report

Rodney Parade
Attendance: 4,072

22 January 2005
19:30

Borders (Scotland)	29–16	(Ireland) Leinster
	Report

Netherdale
Attendance: 1,150

=== Round 16 ===
28 January 2005
19:05

Cardiff Blues (Wales)	12–17	(Scotland) Edinburgh
	Report

Cardiff Arms Park
Attendance: 3,200

28 January 2005
19:30

Borders (Scotland)	9–18	(Ireland) Connacht
	Report

Netherdale
Attendance: 1,176

29 January 2005
17:30

Llanelli Scarlets (Wales)	32–17	(Ireland) Munster
	Report

Stradey Park
Attendance: 7,530

29 January 2005
19:45

Glasgow Warriors (Scotland)	27–27	(Wales) Neath-Swansea Ospreys
	Report

Hughenden
Attendance: 1,715

30 January 2005
16:45

Leinster (Ireland)	55–3	(Wales) Newport Gwent Dragons
	Report

Lansdowne Road
Attendance: 4,600

=== Round 17 ===
18 February 2005
19:05

Newport Gwent Dragons (Wales)	13–11	(Ireland) Ulster
	Report

Rodney Parade
Attendance: 4,452

18 February 2005
19:30

Connacht (Ireland)	11–18	(Wales) Llanelli Scarlets
	Report

Dubarry Park
Attendance: 1,200

19 February 2005
17:30

Neath-Swansea Ospreys (Wales)	34–10	(Scotland) Borders
	Report

The Gnoll
Attendance: 4,057

19 February 2005
19:45

Edinburgh (Scotland)	41–33	(Ireland) Leinster
	Report

Murrayfield
Attendance: 2,400

20 February 2005
17:00

Munster (Ireland)	25–19	(Scotland) Glasgow Warriors
	Report

Thomond Park
Attendance: 5,000

=== Round 18 ===
4 March 2005
19:05

Newport Gwent Dragons (Wales)	42–15	(Scotland) Borders
	Report

Rodney Parade
Attendance: 4,147

4 March 2005
19:30

Edinburgh (Scotland)	13–16	(Ireland) Connacht
	Report

Murrayfield
Attendance: 3,046

4 March 2005
19:30

Ulster (Ireland)	30–3	(Scotland) Glasgow Warriors
	Report

Ravenhill
Attendance: 6,215

5 March 2005
17:30

Cardiff Blues (Wales)	30–20	(Ireland) Munster
	Report

Cardiff Arms Park
Attendance: 3,350

6 March 2005
16:45

Leinster (Ireland)	12–16	(Wales) Neath-Swansea Ospreys
	Report

Donnybrook
Attendance: 3,500

=== Round 19 ===
18 March 2005
19:00

Munster (Ireland)	21–15	(Ireland) Ulster
	Report

Musgrave Park
Attendance: 5,870

18 March 2005
19:05

Neath-Swansea Ospreys (Wales)	30–0	(Wales) Newport Gwent Dragons
	Report

St Helen's
Attendance: 4,113

20 March 2005
14:30

Connacht (Ireland)	21–26	(Ireland) Leinster
	Report

Sportsground
Attendance: 1,100

20 March 2005
15:30

Llanelli Scarlets (Wales)	25–13	(Wales) Cardiff Blues
	Report

Stradey Park
Attendance: 6,116

20 March 2005
19:00

Edinburgh (Scotland)	31–18	(Scotland) Borders
	Report

Murrayfield
Attendance: 3,420

=== Round 20 ===
25 March 2005
17:00

Leinster (Ireland)	31–25	(Wales) Llanelli Scarlets
	Report

Lansdowne Road
Attendance: 3,600

25 March 2005
19:05

Newport Gwent Dragons (Wales)	8–24	(Ireland) Munster
	Report

Rodney Parade
Attendance: 5,902

25 March 2005
19:30

Glasgow Warriors (Scotland)	19–14	(Wales) Cardiff Blues
	Report

Hughenden
Attendance: 3,787

25 March 2005
19:30

Ulster (Ireland)	17–13	(Scotland) Borders
	Report

Ravenhill
Attendance: 7,017

26 March 2005
17:30

Neath-Swansea Ospreys (Wales)	29–12	(Scotland) Edinburgh
	Report

The Gnoll
Attendance: 10,280

=== Round 21 ===
8 April 2005
19:10

Cardiff Blues (Wales)	22–8	(Ireland) Ulster
	Report

Cardiff Arms Park
Attendance: 5,600

9 April 2005
17:30

Llanelli Scarlets (Wales)	30–57	(Scotland) Glasgow Warriors
	Report

Stradey Park
Attendance: 6,480

9 April 2005
19:30

Edinburgh (Scotland)	33–3	(Wales) Newport Gwent Dragons
	Report

Murrayfield
Attendance: 3,656

10 April 2005
16:45

Connacht (Ireland)	13–22	(Wales) Neath-Swansea Ospreys
	Report

Sportsground
Attendance: 2,600

10 April 2005
16:45

Borders (Scotland)	23–38	(Ireland) Munster
	Report

Netherdale
Attendance: 1,646

=== Round 22 ===
15 April 2005
19:05

Cardiff Blues (Wales)	33–12	(Scotland) Borders
	Report

Cardiff Arms Park
Attendance: 4,300

15 April 2005
19:05

Ulster (Ireland)	16–3	(Wales) Llanelli Scarlets
	Report

Ravenhill
Attendance: 7,948

16 April 2005
17:30

Newport Gwent Dragons (Wales)	24–19	(Ireland) Connacht
	Report

Rodney Parade
Attendance: 4,579

16 April 2005
19:30

Glasgow Warriors (Scotland)	23–30	(Ireland) Leinster
	Report

Hughenden
Attendance: 4,364

16 April 2005
19:30

Munster (Ireland)	30–20	(Scotland) Edinburgh
	Report

Thomond Park
Attendance: 5,000

== Leading scorers ==
Note: Flags to the left of player names indicate national team as has been defined under IRB eligibility rules, or primary nationality for players who have not yet earned international senior caps. Players may hold one or more non-IRB nationalities.

=== Top points scorers ===
Rank	Player	Club	Points
1	(Wales) Gavin Henson	(Wales) Neath-Swansea Ospreys	175
2	(New Zealand) David Holwell	(Ireland) Leinster	158
3	(New Zealand) Charlie Hore	(Scotland) Borders	153
3	(Scotland) Dan Parks	(Scotland) Glasgow Warriors	153
5	(Wales) Gareth Bowen	(Wales) Llanelli Scarlets	152

=== Top try scorers ===
Rank	Player	Club	Tries
1	(Wales) Kevin Morgan	(Wales) Newport Gwent Dragons	12
2	(Ireland) Tommy Bowe	(Ireland) Ulster	8
2	(New Zealand) Christian Cullen	(Ireland) Munster	8
2	(New Zealand) Jason Spice	(Wales) Neath-Swansea Ospreys	8
5	(Tonga) Aisea Havili	(Wales) Llanelli Scarlets	6
