= Jon Thiel =

Canada international rugby union player (born 1975)

- Born: 31 May 1975 (age 51) White Rock, British Columbia, Canada
- Height: 185 cm (6 ft 1 in)
- Weight: 115 kg (254 lb)

Rugby union career
- Position: Prop
Amateur team(s)
| Years | Team | Apps | (Points) |
| – | Bayside Sharks | | |
Senior career
| Years | Team | Apps | (Points) |
| 1999–2000 | Narbonne | 4 | (0) |
| 2000–2001 | Sale Sharks | 20 | (0) |
| 2001–2003 | Bridgend | 14 | (0) |
| 2003–2005 | Llanelli Scarlets | 13 | (15) |
| 2005 | Exeter Chiefs | 1 | (0) |
| 2009–2010 | RC Chalon | | |
International career
| Years | Team | Apps | (Points) |
| 1998–2008 | Canada | 44 | (20) |
National sevens team
| Years | Team | | Comps |
| 2006 | Canada | | 1 |

Jon Thiel (born May 31, 1975) is a Canadian former rugby union footballer who played as a prop.

== Rugby career ==
Born in White Rock, British Columbia, he began his rugby career with local club Bayside Sharks. He turned professional in 1999 when he joined French side Narbonne, making 25 appearances in the 1999–2000 season, before moving to England with Sale Sharks after his contract expired.

After a year with Sale, he moved to Wales, where he signed for Bridgend. When the Celtic Warriors were formed in 2003 as a merger of Bridgend and Pontypridd, Thiel was not considered part of the regional squad and briefly returned to Canada before joining the Llanelli Scarlets in November 2003, following the surprise resignation of Martyn Madden, which had left John Davies as the only senior tighthead prop in the squad.

Before making his regional debut, he played four times for Llanelli RFC in the Welsh Premiership; he also made one appearance for Carmarthen Quins.

== During and after injury ==
Having made just 13 appearances in a little over a year with the Scarlets, a serious calf injury brought a premature end to his time at Stradey Park, and he was released in January 2005.

He then returned to Canada, where he took up a player–coach position with Bayside Sharks.

At international level, Thiel made his debut for Canada in 1998, starting in a 38–12 win over Hong Kong. He went to three Rugby World Cups with Canada – in 1999, 2003 and 2007 – and made his final appearance in a 34–13 loss to Wales at the Millennium Stadium on 14 November 2008.

== Personal life ==
Thiel is married to former Canada women's international rugby player Jen Ross, who earned four caps between 1994 and 1996. They have three sons: twins Jake and Josh, and younger brother James. All three sons have also played rugby for Canada: Jake is a sevens specialist, making his senior debut in the 2018 Sydney Sevens, while Josh earned one cap for the senior 15s team, starting at fullback in a 33–17 win over Chile in 2018, and James played as a wing/fullback for Canada's senior development side, the Pacific Pride.
