= Gareth Williams (rugby union, born 1981) =

Welsh rugby union player (born 1981)

Gareth Williams (born 5 September 1981) is a Welsh former rugby union player who played as a flanker. Born in Aberystwyth but raised in the village of Tumble, Carmarthenshire, he played club rugby for Llanelli, Carmarthen Quins and Llandovery, and was also part of the Llanelli Scarlets regional side for the first season of regional rugby in Wales in 2002–03. At international level, he represented Wales at every level from under-16 to under-21.

Williams made his senior debut for Llanelli in November 2000, and made a total of three appearances during the 2000–01 season. In January 2001, he scored two tries in a win over Abercynon. He made five appearances in the 2001–02 season, and scored another try after coming off the bench in a win over Newbridge. In 2002–03, he divided his time between Llanelli and Carmarthen Quins, playing 16 times for Llanelli and 13 times for Quins, for whom he scored all six of his tries that season. In 2003–04, he again played for both Llanelli and Quins, but was also part of the squad for the Scarlets regional side and made three appearances in the opening months of the season before a run of five starts in February and March 2004, in the absence of Ian Boobyer due to injury. He scored his only try for the region in a 37–20 win at home to Munster on 20 February 2004, also his first appearance at home for the region.

In the next two seasons, Williams played exclusively for Carmarthen Quins, before moving to Llandovery, where he played for the next four years, after which he returned to Quins. His last game in senior rugby came in November 2010, in a loss to Neath.
