= Hottie Louw =

South African rugby union player

- Born: Francois Hermanus Louw; 2 March 1976 (age 50) Paarl, Western Cape
- Height: 1.99 m (6 ft 6 in)
- Weight: 120 kg (265 lb)
- School: Boland Agricultural High School, Paarl

Rugby union career
- Position: Lock
Senior career
Years	Team	Apps	(Points)
2003–2005	Clermont	31	
2005–2006	Llanelli Scarlets	18	
2006–2007	Bath	8	
2007–2009	Benetton	45	
Provincial / State sides
Years	Team	Apps	(Points)
1996–2003	Western Province	92	(45)
2006–2007	Blue Bulls	28	(5)
2010	Boland Cavaliers	19	(10)
Super Rugby
Years	Team	Apps	(Points)
1998–2003	Stormers	61	(10)
International career
Years	Team	Apps	(Points)
2002	South Africa	3	

Francois Hermanus "Hottie" Louw (born 2 March 1976) is a South African former rugby union player.

== Playing career ==
Louw matriculated at Boland Agricultural High School and represented Western Province at the annual Craven Week tournament in 1994 and was selected for the 1994 South African Schools team. He made his senior provincial debut for Western Province in 1996.

Louw toured with the Springboks in 2000 to Argentina, Britain and Ireland and played in four tour matches. In 2002 he made his test match debut for the Springboks against Wales at Newlands, as a replacement. He also played in test matches against Argentina and Samoa.

=== Test history ===
No.	Opponents	Results (SA 1st)	Position	Points	Dates	Venue
1.	Wales	19–8	Replacement		15 Jun 2002	Newlands, Cape Town
2.	Argentina	49–29	Lock		29 Jun 2002	PAM Brink Stadium, Springs
3.	Samoa	60–18	Lock		6 Jul 2002	Loftus Versfeld, Pretoria

== See also ==
- List of South Africa national rugby union players – Springbok no. 704
