= David Maddocks =

Welsh rugby union player

David 'Dai' Maddocks (born 20 January 1983, in Haverfordwest) is a Welsh Under 21 international rugby union player. A prop forward, he made 26 appearances for the Welsh regional team Newport Gwent Dragons and also represented the Scarlets. He previously played for Llanelli RFC, Bedwas RFC, Coventry RFC and Newport RFC.

Maddocks joined Jersey in June 2010 and was released by the club in May 2012
