= Bryn Griffiths =

Welsh rugby union footballer

- Born: Bryn Griffiths; 8 March 1982 (age 44) Glanamman, Carmarthenshire, Wales
- Height: 196 cm (6 ft 5 in)
- School: Amman Valley Grammar School
- University: Swansea University

Rugby union career
- Position: Lock
Senior career
Years	Team	Apps	(Points)
- Llanelli Scarlets
–	Newport Gwent Dragons		
–	Doncaster Knights		
–	Cardiff Blues		
–	RC Orléans		
Provincial / State sides
Years	Team	Apps	(Points)
	Llandovery RFC, Pontyberem RFC		(0)
- Correct as of 4 March 2016
International career
Years	Team	Apps	(Points)
- Wales U21
- Correct as of 4 March 2016

Bryn Griffiths (born 8 March 1982) is a Welsh rugby union player. A lock forward, he has represented Wales Youth, Wales under-19s and grand slam-winning Wales under-21s. Now retired, he has represented the Welsh regional teams Llanelli Scarlets, Newport Gwent Dragons and Cardiff Blues.
