= Dafydd Jones =

Wales international rugby union footballer

- Born: Dafydd Aled Rees Jones; 24 June 1979 (age 47) Aberystwyth, Wales
- Height: 198 cm (6 ft 6 in)
- Weight: 108 kg (17 st 0 lb; 238 lb)

Rugby union career
- Position(s): Flanker, Number 8
Senior career
Years	Team	Apps	(Points)
1996–2003	Llanelli RFC	85	(70)
2003–2009	Scarlets	116	(50)
1999–2008	Llandovery RFC	31	(20)
International career
Years	Team	Apps	(Points)
2002–2009	Wales	42	(10)

Dafydd Aled Rees Jones (born 24 June 1979) is a Welsh former rugby union player who played as a flanker for the Scarlets regional side and the Wales national team. First capped in 2002, he made 42 appearances in a seven-year international career. He also played over 200 times for Llanelli, including appearances for both Llanelli RFC and the Scarlets.

== Career ==
Jones was born in Aberystwyth and attended Ysgol Gyfun Aberaeron. A product of Llanelli RFC's youth system, he made his debut for the club in February 1997, coming on as a replacement in a game against Leeds Tykes. He made only a few appearances over the next two seasons before making his breakthrough as a regular during the 1999–2000 season, playing 25 times for Llandovery RFC and eight times for Llanelli. That was reversed the following season, as he played 20 times for Llanelli and twice for Llandovery, before committing exclusively to Llanelli in 2001–02, playing 33 times. He played 20 more times for Llanelli before the advent of regional rugby in Wales, at which point he joined the Scarlets. He made over 100 appearances for the Scarlets and was part of the team that won the Celtic League in 2003–04 and reached the final of the Anglo-Welsh Cup in 2005–06, coming on as a replacement in both the semi-final against Bath and the final against Wasps.

At international level, Jones played for Wales Development as well as the Sevens and 'A' teams. He made his Test debut for Wales against Fiji at the Millennium Stadium on 9 November 2002; Wales won the match 58–14. He was then capped against Canada and New Zealand. After competing in the 2003 Six Nations Championship, he then played against New Zealand and England, before he was included in the Wales squad for the 2003 Rugby World Cup. He played in five matches during the tournament, scoring a try in the pool match against Italy. He played in the 2004 Six Nations Championship, as well as being capped twice in June, and then another four times in November, scoring a try against Romania. He played against England in the 2005 Six Nations Championship, which Wales went on to win. A groin injury meant he was a late withdrawal for the following game against Italy, and also ruled him out of the rest of the Six Nations, as well as the 2005 British & Irish Lions tour to New Zealand. Despite the injury, he signed a three-year contract extension with the Scarlets in March 2005.

In the Scarlets' opening game of the 2005–06 season against Edinburgh Gunners, he snapped a finger ligament; the injury required surgery and was expected to rule him out for three months. His recovery was faster than expected and he was later expected to be able to play for the Scarlets by the end of October. He made his return as a replacement, again against Edinburgh, in the Heineken Cup on 29 October, less than two months since his injury; he scored a try deep into injury time to help the Scarlets to a 15–13 win. After initially being left out of the Wales squad for the 2006 Autumn internationals, his return to club action saw him called up for the game against Fiji on 11 November. He started the game at blindside flanker, but suffered an ankle injury and had to be substituted. After missing another six weeks, he made his return in the Scarlets' festive match against the Dragons on 23 December; minutes after coming off the bench for the injured Gavin Thomas, he scored the Scarlets' first try of the game as they won 28–16. Ahead of the 2006 Six Nations, Jones was given a red card in the Scarlets' 30–13 loss away to Ulster for stamping on Ulster lock Matt McCullough. Reports after the game suggested it might have been a case of mistaken identity and that prop Martyn Madden was the one guilty of stamping, but Jones was found guilty and banned for three weeks, ruling him out of Wales' first two games of the Six Nations, including the opener against England, for which he had already been named on the bench. He returned to action in the Celtic League against Connacht on 18 February, after his suspension was reassessed as running from the date of the sending-off, not the date of the disciplinary hearing. He made his first appearance of the 2006 Six Nations in the final game against France, coming on for Scarlets teammate Alix Popham in the 69th minute. After the Anglo-Welsh Cup final against Wasps, Jones started every game for the rest of the season, albeit playing mostly on the openside flank, and he was called up to the Wales team for their summer tour of Argentina; however, shortly before the tour, Jones suffered a shoulder injury in training and withdrew.

Jones had an operation on the injury in June 2006, and was expected to miss 6–9 months of action. By the end of August 2006, it was expected that he could be back within 6–8 weeks, before later targeting a return against Sale Sharks in the Anglo-Welsh Cup on 2 December. He was picked to start the game, but was unable to prevent a 21–5 defeat that sent Sale into the semi-finals of the competition.

Jones suffered a shoulder injury after coming off the bench in Wales's 19–12 loss to New Zealand on 7 November 2009, and had surgery on his acromioclavicular joint two days later, ruling him out of the rest of the Autumn international series. He had further surgery in June 2010, and the Scarlets remained hopeful for his return to action, but when the injury failed to fully heal, Jones retired from all forms of rugby on 4 January 2011, after failing to fully recover. Jones continued his association with the Scarlets, initially until at least the end of the 2010–11 season, undertaking various roles within the region, including assisting with the Academy, working within the community department to help inspire young players, and aiding sponsor relationships.
