= Salesi Finau =

Tonga international dual-code rugby footballer

Personal information
- Born: 5 May 1973 (age 53) Neiafu, Vava'u, Tonga
- Height: 1.83 m (6 ft 0 in)
- Weight: 103 kg (16 st 3 lb)

Playing information
- Position: Wing
Club
Years	Team	Pld	T	G	FG	P
1994	Canberra Raiders	1	0	0	0	0
1995–97	Warrington Wolves	46	11	0	0	44
	Total	47	11	0	0	44
Representative
Years	Team	Pld	T	G	FG	P
1995	Tonga	2	1	0	0	4

Rugby union career
- Position(s): Centre, Wing
Senior career
Years	Team	Apps	(Points)
1998–2005	Scarlets	203	(210)
2005–2006	Bath	17	(15)
2006–2007	Bourgoin	17	(0)
International career
Years	Team	Apps	(Points)
1998–2005	Tonga	13	(5)
National sevens team
Years	Team		Comps
2002	Tonga		

Salesi Finau (born 5 May 1973) is a Tongan former rugby footballer. He represented Tonga in both the rugby league and rugby union sides.

== Background ==
Finau was born in Neiafu, Vava'u, Tonga.

== Rugby league career ==
Salesi began his career with the Canberra Raiders, and played in the Tonga national rugby league team at the 1995 World Cup. After impressing during the tournament he signed for Warrington Wolves in the Super League.

== Rugby union career ==
=== Club ===
In late 1998 Finau signed for Welsh rugby union side Llanelli Scarlets under coach Gareth Jenkins. Finau made 203 appearances for the side over the next six-year, becoming an instrumental team player, playing in 3 European Cup semi-finals and 2 Celtic League Titles, before ending his contract by mutual consent in September 2005. He then signed for Bath Rugby under John Connolly, spending a season at the West Country club before moving to French side Bourgoin. Finau had a successful season at Bourgoin, and on completion announced that he had signed a 2-year contract for Cornish Pirates. However, in June 2007, the club announced that they had agreed to release Finau from the deal when a family illness obliged him to return to his native Tonga.

=== Country ===
Finau received at least 13 caps for the Tongan national rugby union side, and played in the Tongan rugby sevens side at the 2002 Commonwealth Games.

== TV career ==
Salesi currently presents a cooking show on Television Tonga called 'Salsa with Salesi'.
