= Inoke Afeaki =

Tongan rugby union footballer

- Born: July 12, 1973 (age 53) Tofoa, Tongatapu
- Height: 1.98 m (6 ft 6 in)
- Weight: 115 kg (18 st 2 lb)
- University: Victoria University of Wellington

Rugby union career
- Position(s): Lock, Flanker
Senior career
Years	Team	Apps	(Points)
1993–96	Wellington		
1997–98	Ricoh		
1999–01	Wellington	89	(85)
2002–04	Secom Rugguts		
2005–07	Scarlets	50	(20)
2007–09	Grenoble	40	(5)
2009–11	Saint-Étienne	24	(5)
Super Rugby
Years	Team	Apps	(Points)
1996	Hurricanes	4	(0)
1999–01	Hurricanes	31	(5)
International career
Years	Team	Apps	(Points)
1995–07	Tonga	24	(15)
Coaching career
- Years: Team
- 2010-2011: Saint-Étienne
- 2011-2012: Poneke RFC & WRFU
- 2012-2017: Singapore Rugby Union

Inoke Afeaki (born 12 July 1973 in Tofoa, Tongatapu) is a Tongan former rugby union footballer, coach and administrator. He has played professionally in New Zealand, Japan, Wales, France and Tonga, and coached in France, New Zealand and Singapore. His usual playing position was at lock.

== Career ==
Afeaki has played for the Wellington Lions in the National Provincial Championship, the Hurricanes in the international Super 14 competition, Secom and Ricoh in Japan before joining the Scarlets in Wales. He represented Grenoble in the French Pro D2. He captained Tonga at the 2003 Rugby World Cup. He signed for Saint Etienne in 2009.

In 1986-90, he attended St Bernard's College in Wellington, in 1991 and 1992 he played for the Wellington under 19 and 21 teams respectively. He played for Petone from 1992 through to 1999, and the Wellington Lions from 1993–96 and again from 1999-01. In 1994–95 he played part of the season in Italy with Rugby Viadana in the First division of the Italian championship alongside Tana Umaga, who later became captain of the All Blacks. He made his Super 12 debut for the Hurricanes in 1996, in the first season. He played in Japan from 1997–98, then returned to the Hurricanes from 1999 to 2001. He went back to Japan in 2002 and played there until 2005.

=== International career ===
He made his debut for Tonga on May 26, 1995 in a match against France, coming on as a replacement in Pretoria during the 1995 Rugby World Cup. He also played in two other matches during the tournament, in the starting line-up, against Scotland and Côte d'Ivoire.

He next played for Tonga in November 2001 when he started against Scotland at Murrayfield Stadium. He captained them in their next match against Wales, in which he scored a try. He retained the captaincy for the following season and played four matches for Tonga in 2002. Following captaining them in a number of internationals in 2003, he then led Tonga at the 2003 Rugby World Cup in Australia. In 2004 he was the captain of the Pacific Islanders rugby union team that played a series of matches against southern nations. In an incident during the match against Côte d’Ivoire he tackled Max Brito, an ivoirian player, who broke his neck in the following Ruck that collapsed on him.

Afeaki was coach and technical director at Singapore Rugby Union from 2012 to 2017, before taking sports administration positions in Tonga.

== Personal life ==
Afeaki's family moved from Tonga to Petone when he was three. He now lives in Wellington and works as the site Health and Safety Officer at LT McGuinness Ltd.

Afeaki is married to Kanoko, who is Japanese. The couple has two sons. He became a New Zealand citizen in 2022 and stood as a candidate in the Wellington City Council election that year.
