= Craig Dunlea =

New Zealand rugby union player

Craig Dunlea is a rugby union prop who was born in Leeston, New Zealand on 2 June 1976.

He is a former representative of Otago Highlanders, Scarlets, and Exeter Chiefs. For the Scarlets he played over 30 games, between December 2005 and May 2007, scoring 3 tries.
