= Regan King =

New Zealand rugby player (born 1980)

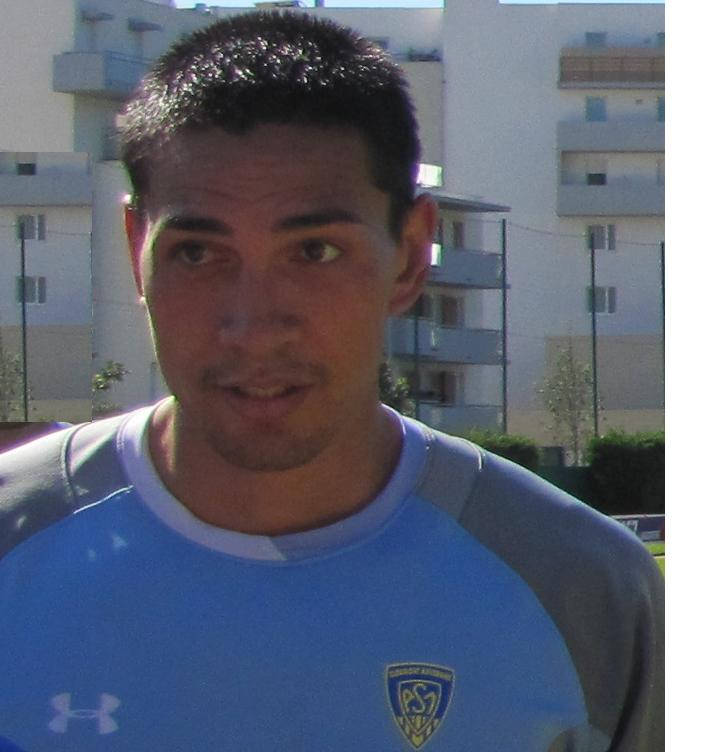
- King while playing for Clermont Auvergne
- Born: Regan Matthew King; 2 October 1980 (age 46) Cambridge, New Zealand
- Height: 1.88 m (6 ft 2 in)
- Weight: 93 kg (14 st 9 lb)
- School: Cambridge High School
- Notable relative(s): Jacob Cowley (son); Joelle King (sister)

Rugby union career
- Position: Centre
Senior career
Years	Team	Apps	(Points)
2004–2005	Stade Français	13	(5)
2005–2011	Scarlets	126	(165)
2011–2014	Clermont Auvergne	66	(40)
2014–2016	Scarlets	37	(0)
2016	Jersey Reds	8	(0)
2018–	Neath	0	(0)
- Correct as of 30 November 2018
Provincial / State sides
Years	Team	Apps	(Points)
2001–2003	Waikato	23	(90)
2017–	Mid Canterbury		
Super Rugby
Years	Team	Apps	(Points)
2003	Chiefs	11	(10)
- Correct as of 10 May 2003
International career
Years	Team	Apps	(Points)
2002	New Zealand	1	(5)

Regan Matthew King (born 2 October 1980) is a New Zealand rugby union player who plays as a centre. He currently plays for Mid Canterbury in the Heartland Championship and Neath RFC in the Welsh Premier Division. He holds a British passport thanks to his British-born father, Paul King.

== Career ==
After finishing school at Cambridge High School, King played for local rugby club Hautapu and was selected to play for Waikato in 2001. After playing for Waikato and the Chiefs, he made his first and only Test appearance on 23 November 2002 against Wales at the Millennium Stadium in Cardiff. Following this, King suffered several injuries hindering the progress of his career in New Zealand and taking him out of the NPC and Super 12. After recovering, King was recruited by Stade Français in November 2004.

After an unsuccessful six months in France, he moved to Wales to play for the Llanelli Scarlets.

In 2006, he was voted the best outside centre in the world by readers of Planet-Rugby.com for their 2006 World XV. King was the only one of the players voted into the side that had not played any international rugby in the preceding 12 months.

In January 2011 King agreed to join Clermont Auvergne at the end of the season.

After three years in France, King rejoined the Scarlets signing a two-year deal ahead of the 2014/15 season.

On 30 October 2015, King played alongside his son Jacob Cowley for the Scarlets against the Newport Gwent Dragons, making them the first father and son pair to play together in the Pro 12.

On 6 May 2016, it was announced that King would be leaving the Scarlets and joining Jersey Reds for the 2016–17 season.

King returned to New Zealand in 2017 and joined the Mid Canterbury club side Southern, helping them to win the Watters Cup competition final on 23 July at Mayfield.

== Personal life ==
King's sister, Joelle, is a professional squash player who won Commonwealth Games gold medals in the doubles competition in 2010 and the singles competition in 2018. She also competed at the 2014 Commonwealth Games, winning a bronze medal in the singles competition.
