= Adam Jones (rugby union, born 1980) =

Welsh rugby union player

- Full name: Adam Mathias Jones
- Born: 12 January 1980 (age 46) Swansea, Wales
- Height: 2.01 m (6 ft 7 in)
- Weight: 115 kg (254 lb; 18 st 2 lb)

Rugby union career
- Position: Tighthead Prop
Senior career
Years	Team	Apps	(Points)
1998–1999	Swansea	2	(0)
1999–2000	Saracens	4	(5)
2000–2001	Harlequins	10	(0)
2001–2003	Cardiff	44	(10)
2003–2007	Llanelli Scarlets	109	(1)
2004–2005	Llandovery	4	(5)
2004–2005	Carmarthen Quins	1	(0)
2007–2014	Newport Gwent Dragons	127	(20)
2008–2014	Cross Keys	4	(0)
2010–2011	Newport	5	(0)
International career
Years	Team	Apps	(Points)
- Wales U19
2006	Wales	2	(0)

Adam Mathias Jones (born 12 January 1980) is a Welsh former professional rugby union player who played as a lock. He captained the Wales Under-19 team and earned his first caps for the Wales senior team as a replacement against England and Scotland in the 2006 Six Nations Championship. He began his career with Swansea RFC before a spell in England with Saracens and Harlequins, before returning to Wales with Cardiff RFC. At the start of the Welsh regional era, he signed for the Llanelli Scarlets and played for them for four seasons, before a seven-year spell with the Newport Gwent Dragons. He also made appearances for Llandovery RFC, Carmarthen Quins RFC, Cross Keys RFC and Newport RFC.

== Career ==
Born in Swansea, he began his professional career with Swansea RFC, making just two appearances towards the end of the 1998–99 season, before a move to Saracens ahead of the 1999–2000 season. He made four appearances for Saracens, all as a substitute, and scored his first professional try for the club in that time. The following season he moved across London to Harlequins, and made 10 appearances during the 2000–01 season. After two years in England, he returned to Wales with Cardiff RFC, where he became a regular starter over two years there. In 2003, he joined the newly formed Llanelli Scarlets regional side. In four seasons with the Scarlets, he made over 100 appearances, scoring just one try in a friendly match against a select XV made up of players from the Scarlets' Welsh Premiership affiliate clubs. While playing for the Scarlets, he also made appearances in the Premiership for Llandovery and Carmarthen Quins.

After being called up as an injury replacement for an uncapped match against the French Barbarians in 2000, Jones travelled with a developmental Wales team for a tour of Canada. He received his first full call-up to the Wales senior team in January 2006. After being omitted from coach Mike Ruddock's initial squad for the 2006 Six Nations Championship, Jones was called up on 24 January as cover for Jonathan Thomas, who had suffered a hamstring injury while playing for the Ospreys. He was named on the bench for the opening game against England, coming on as a temporary blood replacement for Ian Gough before permanently entering the game for the last 15 minutes. He retained his place on the bench the following week against Scotland, coming on for Robert Sidoli for the last two minutes of the game. Thomas' return from injury saw him take Jones' place on the bench for the last three games of the Six Nations, and allowed Jones to be released from the Wales squad for the Scarlets' Anglo-Welsh Cup semi-final against Bath on 4 March 2006. He started that game as the Scarlets won 27–26, and also started in the final, which they lost 26–10 to London Wasps.

In June 2007, Jones signed for the Newport Gwent Dragons as a replacement for the departing Ian Gough. He made his competitive debut against his former side on 1 September 2007. He extended his contract with the Dragons in 2009.

Jones retired from professional rugby in March 2014. At the time of his retirement, he had made the most total appearances in the history of Welsh regional rugby.
