= Mark Jones (rugby union, born 1979) =

Wales international rugby union footballer

- Born: Mark Anthony Jones; 7 November 1979 (age 47) Builth Wells, Powys, Wales
- Height: 1.86 m (6 ft 1 in)
- Weight: 91 kg (14 st 5 lb)

Rugby union career
- Position: Wing
Senior career
Years	Team	Apps	(Points)
1995–1996	Builth Wells	?	(?)
1998–2005	Llandovery	43	(150)
1998–2005	Llanelli	85	(285)
2003–2010	Scarlets	77	(135)
International career
Years	Team	Apps	(Points)
	Wales U18	?	(?)
	Wales U19	?	(?)
	Wales U21	1	(0)
2001–2009	Wales	47	(65)
Coaching career
- Years: Team
- 2010–2015: Scarlets (Attack/Skills Coach)
- 2012–2013: Wales (Interim Attack Coach)
- 2015–2016: Rotherham (Head Coach)
- 2016–2019: RGC 1404 (Head Coach)
- 2019: Namibia (Backs Coach)
- 2020–2021: Crusaders (Backs Coach)
- 2020–2021: Canterbury (Attack/Backs Coach)
- 2021–2022: Worcester Warriors (Defence/Kicking Coach)
- 2023: Wales U20s (Interim Head Coach)
- 2023–2024: Ospreys (Defence Coach)
- 2024–: Ospreys (Head Coach)
- Correct as of 29 December 2024

Mark Anthony Jones (born 7 November 1979) is a Welsh professional rugby union coach and former player who played as a wing for the Scarlets and Wales. Since making his international debut for Wales in 2001, he won 47 caps and scored 13 tries. He is currently head coach of the Ospreys.

== Early life ==
Jones was born in Builth Wells, Powys. As a youngster, as well as playing rugby, Jones was also a sprinter and once competed against future World Junior Athletics champion Christian Malcolm in a 100 metres final; Jones said his performance against Malcolm was the reason he gave up athletics for a career in rugby. He began his domestic career at Builth Wells Youth before joining the senior side. He was signed by Llandovery from Builth and in his first season of senior rugby was the highest try scorer in the Welsh League. Jones joined Llanelli in 1997 and remained at the club until his retirement in 2010. Jones has represented Wales at U18, U19 and U20 levels and made his first team debut for Wales as a replacement against England in the 2001 Lloyds TSB Six Nations.

== Career ==
During the 2005–06 season, Jones won six international caps and scored three tries. This was after consecutive knee injuries and major reconstructive surgery saw him ruled out of Wales contention since the 2003 Rugby World Cup.

Jones scored seven tries for the Scarlets during the 2006–07 season, three of which came in the region's Heineken Cup run, including one in the semi-final loss to the Leicester Tigers.

Jones appeared for Wales in the 2007 Six Nations against Scotland, Italy and in the sole victory over England. In June, Jones was named in Gareth Jenkins's 41-man preliminary Rugby World Cup 2007 summer training squad after being rested from the two Test tour to Australia. Jones made the final 30-man cut for the World Cup squad in August and played in Wales' warm-up matches ahead of the tournament, scoring a try against Argentina.

Jones appeared for Wales in the Rugby World Cup in pool matches against Canada and Australia. He also played in the final Pool B encounter, scoring a try in Wales's defeat at the hands of Fiji, which saw them eliminated from the tournament. In November 2007 Jones was selected by caretaker coach Nigel Davies in the line-up to face world champions South Africa in the Prince William Cup at the Millennium Stadium.

New Wales head coach Warren Gatland included Jones in his Grand Slam-winning 2008 Six Nations squad. He played in four matches, only missing the game against Scotland, and almost scored a try in the championship decider against France, stopped just short of the line after a break.

In July 2009, it was announced that Jones was to be handed the captaincy for the Scarlets' 2009–10 season. However, he tore cartilage in his knee while on Wales duty in November 2009, and was ruled out for at least three months. In March 2010, he was ruled out for the remainder of the season, and in April, he expressed concerns that the injury might force him into retirement. He eventually retired from the game in August 2010, bringing to an end a 12-year career. He played 163 times for the Scarlets, including appearances for Llanelli RFC in the pre-regional era, scoring 85 tries.

== Coaching career ==
Following his retirement, Jones was announced as a skills coach for the Scarlets region on a two-year contract. This saw him coach skills both at first-team level and with a wider responsibility within the Premiership teams, Academy and age-grade pathways for the region.

In 2012 he joined Wales set up, supporting Rob Howley at the 2012 autumn internationals. In 2013 he became interim attack coach during the Six Nations Championship. He also accompanied Robin McBryde on the 2013 tour of Japan.

In 2015 he became head coach of the Rotherham Titans in the Championship, taking over from Lee Blackett. He departed in 2016, with Titans chairman Nick Cragg describing Jones as "a quality individual for whom we have the greatest respect" but stating that "results over the last three months have not been what we would have wished them to be and both parties have agreed that now is the time for change".

Jones took over as head coach of Colwyn Bay-based side RGC 1404 in 2016 as they moved into the Welsh Premier Division for that season. He led the side into a spell of exciting rugby, with commentators praising the Gogs' "sizzling, attacking style" which led to their victory in the Welsh National Cup in 2017.

Jones was critical of WRU plans in 2017 to include regional A and under 23 sides in the new Celtic Cup, stating that it devalued Welsh club rugby and threatened the existence of semi-professional teams.

After three years at Eirias Stadium, Jones stood down as head coach of RGC, stating that the travel between his home town of Neath and Colwyn Bay was becoming too difficult for his family. He described one occasion where he travelled 800 miles in one weekend between work, attending his son's football game, and returning home to Neath. He told WalesOnline that he would continue to seek a coaching role, ideally at a PRO14 Welsh regional side. He described his preferred coaching style as "working with players with a tracksuit on", but said his time in Colwyn Bay had particularly helped him develop as an off-field coach.

During the 2019 Rugby World Cup, Jones was offered a role coaching the Namibia national rugby union team in Japan, "working closely with the Namibia backs both prior and during the competition". He was joined by fellow ex-Wales players Dale McIntosh and Wayne Proctor.

In January 2020 Jones surprised rugby pundits when he announced he was moving to Christchurch and joining the coaching setup at the Super Rugby side Crusaders on a two-year deal. Jones will serve as defence coach under head coach Scott Robertson and be running the attack and the backs with Canterbury, moving to New Zealand in 2020 after spending Christmas in Wales. In his interview upon joining the side, he described the South Island team as "the best rugby organisation in the world".

In January 2025 Jones was announced as new Ospreys head coach.
