= Liam Davies (rugby union) =

Welsh rugby union player (born 1986)

- Full name: Liam Davies
- Born: 10 May 1986 (age 40) Llangennech
- Height: 1.78 m (5 ft 10 in)
- Weight: 92 kg (14 st 7 lb)

Rugby union career
- Position: Scrum-half
Senior career
| Years | Team | Apps | (Points) |
| 2004–2008 | Llanelli | 33 | (43) |
| 2005–2008 | Llanelli Scarlets | 32 | (10) |
| 2008–2009 | Brive | ? | (?) |
| 2009–2010 | Ospreys | 4 | (0) |
| 2009 | Aberavon | 1 | (0) |
| 2009–2010 | Swansea | 2 | (5) |
| 2010 | London Welsh | ? | (?) |
| 2010–2012 | Dax | ? | (?) |
| 2012 | Scarlets | 7 | (5) |
| 2012 | Llanelli | 1 | (0) |
| 2012–2013 | Newport Gwent Dragons | 7 | (0) |
| 2012–2013 | Bedwas | 4 | (0) |
| 2013 | Cardiff Blues | 0 | (0) |
| 2013 | Cardiff | 1 | (0) |
| 2013 | Neath | 3 | (5) |
International career
| Years | Team | Apps | (Points) |
| 2006 | Wales U21 | ? | (?) |

Liam Davies (born 10 May 1986) is a Welsh rugby union footballer.

== Career ==
A scrum-half, Davies began his professional rugby career with the Llanelli Scarlets, and made his league debut for the Scarlets while still in the region's development squad, playing against Cardiff Blues on 14 September 2005. He made a further nine appearances in the 2005–06 season, scoring a try against Glasgow Warriors on 16 October 2005. In March 2006, Davies was promoted to the Scarlets' first team squad, signing on a professional development contract.

Davies started the 2006–07 season as the Scarlets' third-choice scrum-half, behind Dwayne Peel and Clive Stuart-Smith, and so was forced to wait until December to make his first appearance of the season. Again, he made a further nine appearances that season, scoring one try.

With Dwayne Peel away at the 2007 Rugby World Cup, Davies started the 2007–08 season at the top of the Scarlets' scrum-half pecking order with Gavin Cattle. The two of them shared duties in the number 9 shirt for the first three months of the season, before Peel's return, but they soon got back into action when Peel joined up with the Wales squad for the 2008 Six Nations.

In June 2008, Davies signed for Brive on a two-year contract. He made his debut on 6 September 2008 in a 16–16 draw with Castres.

On 21 June 2009, Davies signed a three-year contract with the Ospreys.

In January 2010, Davies joined London Welsh on loan. He was released by the Ospreys at the end of the 2009–10 season and joined French club Dax.

On 5 January 2012, he signed back for the Scarlets as cover because the Scarlets scrum-half Tavis Knoyle injured his shoulder and would be out for at least three months.

Davies was released by the Scarlets at the end of the 2011–12 season and in September 2012 joined Newport Gwent Dragons. In January 2013, Davies joined Cardiff Blues making him the second player to play for all four Welsh regions after Tal Selley.
