= Aled Gravelle =

Welsh rugby union player

Rugby union career
- Position: Hooker
Senior career
Years	Team	Apps	(Points)
–	Llanelli	17	
?–2007	Scarlets	67	

Aled Gravelle is a Welsh rugby union player. He started his career playing at flanker before converting to Hooker. He was tall for a hooker, standing 6’2” and weighed 110kgs. He was known for his defensive organising. He played for Llanelli RFC before moving up to play for Scarlets, making 67 appearances before being released in 2007.
