= Martyn Madden =

Welsh rugby union player

- Born: Martyn Joseph Madden; 4 December 1973 (age 52) Cardiff, Wales
- Height: 1.77 m (5 ft 10 in)
- Weight: 123 kg (19 st 5 lb)

Rugby union career
- Position: Prop
Senior career
Years	Team	Apps	(Points)
1996–1997	Pontypool	21	(30)
1997–1998	Penzance & Newlyn		
1998–2003	Llanelli	145	(100)
2003	→Caerphilly (loan)	1	(0)
2003–2004	Cardiff	4	(0)
2004–2005	Caerphilly		
2005–2006	Llanelli Scarlets	11	(10)
2006–2007	Bedwas		
2007	London Welsh		
International career
Years	Team	Apps	(Points)
2002–2003	Wales	5	(0)

Martyn Madden (born 4 December 1973 in Cardiff) is a Welsh former rugby union player. Madden made his debut for the Wales national team on 8 June 2002 against the Springboks. A prop forward, he played club rugby for Llanelli Scarlets.
