= Aisea Havili =

Tonga international rugby union player (born 1977)

- Born: 'Aisea Havili Kaufusi; March 11, 1977 (age 49) Ha'ateiho, Tonga
- Height: 5 ft 10 in (1.78 m)
- Weight: 15 st 3 lb (97 kg)

Rugby union career
- Position: Wing
Senior career
Years	Team	Apps	(Points)
- Bridgend
2003–2004	Celtic Warriors	5	(5)
2004–2005	Llanelli Scarlets	27	(100)
2005–2008	Worcester Warriors	36	(85)
2008–	Cornish Pirates	31	(63)
International career
Years	Team	Apps	(Points)
2000-2007	Tonga	10	(10)
- Correct as of 5 January 2008

'Aisea Havili Kaufusi (born 11 March 1977) is a Tongan rugby union footballer, who currently played most recently as a winger for the Cornish Pirates in National Division One as well as for the Tonga national team.

== Club career ==
Havili began his rugby career in his home country of Tonga, before eventually moving to Wales to play for Bridgend. Upon the advent of regional rugby in Wales in 2003, he joined the Celtic Warriors, whom he played for until they were disbanded in 2004. He was picked up by the Llanelli Scarlets soon afterwards and became the top try scorer in his first season in West Wales

However, in 2005, Worcester showed an interest in Havili and he was released from his contract after just one year with the Scarlets so that he could sign for the West Midlands club. Havili's first season at Worcester went well, scoring a total of ten tries in just 16 appearances.

After not making a single appearance in the 2007–08 season, it was announced in May 2008 that Havili would be leaving Worcester Warriors to sign for National Division One side Cornish Pirates.

Havili provided Cornish Pirates with an alternative style of winger. His physical presence set him apart from most backs within the squad. Perhaps his most noticeable performance came against Plymouth Albion the league in December 2009 where he his try help complete a 46–7 win.

At the end of the 09/10 season Havili left the Cornish Pirates before returning to Tonga.

== International career ==
Havili has had an erratic international career, having earned only nine caps for the Tonga national team. He was selected for the Tonga 2003 Rugby World Cup squad, but pulled out after being told that he would have to pay his own way to Australia to join up with the rest of the squad. Havili was, however, still selected for the 2007 World Cup.
