= Matthew Watkins =

Welsh rugby union player (1978–2020)

- Full name: Matthew Jason Watkins
- Born: 2 September 1978 Newport, Wales
- Died: 7 March 2020 (aged 41)
- Height: 1.83 m (6 ft 0 in)
- Weight: 95 kg (14 st 13 lb)
- School: Oakdale Comprehensive School

Rugby union career
- Position: Centre
Youth career
- Newbridge
- Pontllanfraith
Senior career
Years	Team	Apps	(Points)
1997–2002	Newport	121	(175)
2002–2003	Llanelli	26	(50)
2003–2008	Llanelli Scarlets	124	(169)
2008–2009	Gloucester	22	(10)
2009–2011	Newport Gwent Dragons	20	(5)
2009–2011	Newport	10	(0)
International career
Years	Team	Apps	(Points)
2003–2006	Wales	18	(0)

Matthew Jason Watkins (2 September 1978 – 7 March 2020) was a Welsh professional rugby union player who played as a centre. He was commonly known by the name Matthew J. Watkins to avoid confusion with another Welsh rugby union player of the same name.

Born in Newport, Watkins began his rugby career with Newbridge and Pontllanfraith before going professional with Newport in 1997. After scoring 35 tries (175 points) in 121 appearances over five seasons with the club, Watkins was signed by Llanelli. He was then part of the team at the dawn of regional rugby in Wales in 2003 and was part of the original Llanelli Scarlets regional side. He was also called up to the Wales national team several times during his spell with the Scarlets, earning 18 caps between 2003 and 2006.

By 2007, he had become only the third player to reach 100 appearances for the region, following lock Adam Jones and prop John Davies. Watkins signed for Gloucester at the end of the 2007–08 season, midway through a three-year contract with the Scarlets.

On 3 August 2009, it was confirmed that Watkins would return to Wales and to the place where his professional rugby career began, signing for Newport Gwent Dragons on a two-year contract. He was released at the end of the 2010–11 season and retired soon after.

On 20 May 2013, it was announced that Watkins had developed a very rare pelvic cancer while studying for rugby coaching qualifications, but described himself as remaining "well and active". On 7 March 2020, it was announced that Watkins had died at the age of 41.
