= John Davies (rugby union, born 1969) =

Welsh rugby union player

- Born: John Davies; 1 February 1969 (age 57) Carmarthen, Wales
- Height: 6 ft (1.8 m)
- Weight: 17 st (110 kg)
- School: Ysgol y Preseli

Rugby union career
- Position: Prop
Amateur team(s)
Years	Team	Apps	(Points)
- Crymych Youth
Senior career
Years	Team	Apps	(Points)
- Neath
	Richmond	78	(?)
1999–2008	Llanelli	40	(5)
2003–2007	Llanelli Scarlets	119	(?)
2018–2019	Crymych		(?)
International career
Years	Team	Apps	(Points)
1991–1998	Wales	34	(5)

John Davies (born 1 February 1969) is a former Welsh rugby union prop. He spent much of his professional career playing for Llanelli RFC and subsequently the Llanelli Scarlets regional side, where he now works as an academy coach. Davies also made 34 appearances for the Wales national team, scoring two tries. Davies was a farmer.

== Playing career ==
Davies made his international debut for Wales on 16 February 1991, in a match against Ireland during the Five Nations. The match, which was played in Cardiff, resulted in a 21–21 draw. He was capped again that year against France, and once the following season.

He was included in Wales' squad for the Five Nations of 1993, mostly as an unused bench replacement, but came on in the final game against France. He was also capped against Zimbabwe, in which Davies scored a try. He was also capped against Canada and Japan that year.

He was capped over 10 times for Wales in 1994, including all the matches in the Five Nations. The following season he played in the 1995 World Cup in South Africa, though Wales did not make the quarter-finals, he played in all three pool matches. In 1996 he was capped nine times for Wales, including a match against the Barbarian F.C. He played matches against Zimbabwe and the Springboks in 1998.

On 18 February 1995, he became the first player in Five Nations rugby to receive a red card when French referee Didier Mené dismissed him for kicking Ben Clarke at Cardiff during a match against England.

In 2003, Davies was named as one of four senior props in the inaugural squad of the newly founded Llanelli Scarlets regional side. He missed just one game during the 2003–04 season, starting all but five, with Jon Thiel preferred for five of the last seven games. He also played in all but one of the Scarlets' games the following season, six of them off the bench, as Thiel was preferred for the first three matches of the season and Dave Hewett started the games against the Borders, the Ospreys and the Dragons in December and January.

The 2005–06 season saw the Scarlets struggle with injuries at the prop position; Davies was the only tighthead prop available following an injury to Ricky Davies in a pre-season friendly against Worcester Warriors. Despite being involved in a car crash in the week leading up to the opening game of the season, Davies played the full 80 minutes against Edinburgh Gunners. New Zealander Craig Dunlea was signed to alleviate the injury crisis in December 2005, but Davies still played in all but two matches between the start of the season and 21 January, including all three Anglo-Welsh Cup pool matches and all six Heineken Cup pool matches. After that, he started just five more matches, but two of those were the Anglo-Welsh Cup semi-final and final.

In May 2006, Davies signed a one-year contract extension with the Scarlets, but at the age of 37, he started just six times during the season, with Dunlea and newly signed prop Deacon Manu preferred for the majority of games. On 6 April 2007, Davies became the second player to make 100 appearances for the Llanelli Scarlets – following Adam Jones, who had reached the milestone earlier in the season – when he started their 53–11 win at home to Border Reivers. Davies retired from professional rugby at the end of the season, playing his final game on the last day of the season in a 19–10 home win over Connacht.

Davies made a brief return to first-team rugby when he played for Crymych RFC in September 2018 at the age of 49.
