= Barry Davies (rugby union, born 1981) =

Welsh rugby union player

- Born: Barry Davies; 5 March 1981 (age 45) Carmarthen, Wales
- Height: 6 ft (1.8 m)
- Weight: 12 st (76 kg)
- School: Queen Elizabeth Cambria School

Rugby union career
- Position: Fullback
Senior career
Years	Team	Apps	(Points)
2000–2007	Llanelli RFC	150	(337)
2003–2007	Scarlets	54	(134)
2005	→Carmarthen Quins	1	(16)
2007–2009	Brive	36	(60)
2009–2012	Ospreys	31	(18)
2012–2013	Jersey Reds	12	(3)
2013–2015	Coventry RFC		
- Correct as of 16 November 2022
International career
Years	Team	Apps	(Points)
2006	Wales	1	(0)
- Correct as of 12 July 2014

Barry Davies (born 5 March 1981 in Carmarthen, Wales) is a retired Welsh rugby union footballer. Davies has also been capped by Wales at international level. His primary position was at fullback.

== Club career ==
Davies joined Llanelli as a 19-year-old from Carmarthen Athletic. He has since made over 100 appearances for Llanelli and the Llanelli Scarlets. During his career at Stradey Park he became the region's top try scorer, racking up 37 tries in his lengthy stay at the region.

Later in his career with the Llanelli Scarlets, Davies built a reputation as a skilled goal kicker. During and after the 2003 season, Davies would attempt kicks at goal from long distances. His furthest kick was against Ulster in the Celtic League at Ravenhill from an estimated distance of 59 metres. Though he did not perform these kicks often, they earned him the nickname 'Barry the Boot' from one commentator during the EDF Energy and then again during the Powergen Cup semi-final against Bath.

In 2007, Davies joined French club CA Brive, and in June 2009, he joined the Ospreys. He was released by the Ospreys in July 2012.

Davies joined Jersey Reds in 2012, spending one season with the Championship side. Following his departure from Jersey, Davies joined Coventry R.F.C. He signed on with the club for one more season, in 2014.

Nowadays, he is a director for nutrivend and has a wife, a child and a dog.

== International career ==
Davies was first included in the Welsh squad in 2004, for the Six Nations, following injuries to Garan Evans and Hal Luscombe.

After scoring a memorable try for the Scarlets against Northampton Saints in the Heineken Cup pool stages, where the Scarlets needed to win the game to qualify for the quarter-finals, Davies was again called up, this time for the 2004 June rugby union tests. He was an unused bench replacement in a match against Argentina on 19 June.

He made his debut for Wales in early 2006, during the Six Nations that year. He came off the bench in a match against Ireland at Lansdowne Road, which Wales lost 31–5.
