= Tal Selley =

Wales international rugby union player (born 1980)

- Born: Taliesin Selley; 20 April 1980 (age 46) Pembroke Dock, Pembrokeshire, Wales
- Height: 1.83 m (6 ft 0 in)
- Weight: 93 kg (14 st 9 lb; 205 lb)

Rugby union career
- Position: centre
Youth career
- Pembroke Dock Harlequins
Senior career
Years	Team	Apps	(Points)
2001–2006	Scarlets		
2006–2007	Ospreys		
2007–2008	Cardiff Blues		
2008–2009	Newport Gwent Dragons		
2009	Birmingham & Solihull		
International career
Years	Team	Apps	(Points)
2005	Wales	1	(5)
2005-2009	Wales Sevens	24	(362)
2005–2011	Barbarians	5	(0)
Medal record
Men's rugby sevens
Representing Wales
Rugby World Cup Sevens
Gold medal – first place	2009 Dubai	Team competition

Taliesin Selley (born 20 April 1980) is a Welsh former rugby union footballer, who played either at centre or on the wing.

After five seasons at the Llanelli Scarlets he signed a three-year deal with the Ospreys where he played in the historic victory over Australia. He played on loan at the Cardiff Blues and the Newport Gwent Dragons. He made numerous appearances for the Barbarians as well as representing the Help for Heroes rugby team. Selley was the first player to play for all four Welsh regions. He also played many years as a junior for Pembroke Dock Harlequins.

== National team ==
Selley toured with Wales to Argentina, South Africa, United States, and Canada and scored a try on his senior international debut for Wales in 2005 versus the United States in Hartford, Connecticut.

A regular for Wales on the IRB Sevens circuit, Selley remained the Wales national rugby sevens team's top try scorer with 60 tries, before being overtaken by Luke Morgan in 2016, and also the countries top point scorer in IRB Sevens history. He played in the 2006 Melbourne Commonwealth Games.

Selley is a World Champion, when despite the odds of 80–1, Wales triumphed in Dubai in March 2009 and were crowned 2009 Rugby World Cup Sevens champions. Selley also had the honour of being named "2009 Player of the Tournament", an award previously won by Lawrence Dallaglio (1993), Jonah Lomu (2001) and Waisale Serevi (2005).
