= Ceiron Thomas =

Welsh rugby player (born 1983)

- Born: Ceiron Thomas; 23 October 1983 (age 43) Swansea
- Height: 1.83 m (6 ft 0 in)
- Weight: 93 kg (14 st 9 lb)

Rugby union career
- Position(s): Fly-half, fullback
Amateur team(s)
Years	Team	Apps	(Points)
2012–2013	St Ives RFC		
Senior career
Years	Team	Apps	(Points)
2009–11	Leeds Carnegie	0	(0)
2011–12	Cornish Pirates		
- Correct as of 13:47, 30 June 2009 (UTC)
Provincial / State sides
Years	Team	Apps	(Points)
2003–2009	Scarlets	71	(288)
- Correct as of 13 May 2013 (UTC)

Ceiron Thomas (born 23 October 1983) is a Welsh former rugby union footballer who played for the Scarlets, Leeds Carnegie, Cornish Pirates, and St Ives RFC. His regular position was at fly-half, though he often played at fullback.

Thomas began his rugby career with the Llanelli-based Scarlets, and made his debut for the region in 2003 when he played in a friendly against the Slovenia national team. Llanelli won the game 95–0, scoring 14 tries, with Thomas converting eleven of them. He also scored one penalty, bringing his points total for the game to 25. In the 2003–04 season, Thomas made five appearances for Llanelli, including three in the 2003-04 Celtic League.

However, Thomas did not play for the regional side again until April 2005, almost 18 months after his last appearance. He made three more appearances in the 2004–05 season, before falling out of favour and not making another appearance until April 2006. Again, he only made two more appearances in the 2005–06 season but managed to hold down a place in the side for the 2006–07 Magners League, sharing duties at fullback with Barry Davies and Morgan Stoddart. He made 25 appearances that season, and scored 110 points.

Thomas began the 2007–08 Magners League as the Scarlets' starting fly-half, while regular number 10 Stephen Jones was on Wales duty at the 2007 Rugby World Cup in France, but lost the berth to rival fly-half Rhys Priestland before Jones' return. In the 2008–09 Magners League, Thomas spent much of his time on the bench, playing second-fiddle to Jones and Priestland at fly-half, and the majority of his playing time was spent in other positions, including two starts on the wing in December 2008. Thomas only made six appearances for the Scarlets in 2009, resulting in a transfer to Leeds Carnegie in June 2009.
