= Garan Evans =

Welsh rugby union footballer

- Born: Garan Rhys Evans; 16 February 1973 (age 53) Trimsaran, Wales
- Height: 1.82 m (6 ft 0 in)
- Weight: 85 kg (13 st 5 lb)

Rugby union career
- Position: Fullback
Senior career
Years	Team	Apps	(Points)
1993–2003	Llanelli RFC	254	(565)
2003–2008	Llanelli Scarlets	89	(60)
- Correct as of 11 February 2008
International career
Years	Team	Apps	(Points)
1998–2003	Wales	4	(5)

Garan Rhys Evans (born 16 February 1973) is a Welsh former rugby union footballer, who played as a fullback for Llanelli, the Llanelli Scarlets and Wales.

Evans was born in Trimsaran and educated at Ysgol y Strade in Llanelli. He made his international debut for Wales on 27 June 1998 in Pretoria against South Africa; the Welsh team were beaten 96–13. Evans did not play for Wales again until 2003, when he was capped against Ireland at Lansdowne Road; Wales lost the match 12–35. He then played in the victory over Scotland.

He was included in Wales' squad at the 2003 Rugby World Cup, but only played for a matter of seconds against New Zealand before suffering a neck injury and having to be stretchered off by paramedics. He retired in 2008. His twin brother, Deiniol, also played for Llanelli RFC.
