= Anglo-Welsh Cup =

Rugby union event

- Formerly: RFU Knockout Cup
- Sport: Rugby union
- Founded: 2005; 21 years ago
- Folded: 2018; 8 years ago
- Replaced by: Premiership Rugby Cup
- No. of teams: 16
- Countries: England; Wales
- Last champion: Exeter (2nd title)
- Most titles: Leicester Tigers (3 titles)
- Broadcasters: BBC Sport (2005–2009); Sky Sports (2009–2015); BT Sport (live, 2016–2018); Channel 5 (highlights, 2016–2018)

The Anglo-Welsh Cup (Welsh: Cwpan Eingl-Gymreig), was a cross-border rugby union knock-out cup competition that featured the 12 Premiership Rugby clubs and the four Welsh regions. It was a created as a replacement for the RFU Knockout Cup, which featured only English clubs.

The competition was replaced by the Premiership Rugby Cup, involving only the 12 English Premiership clubs, beginning with the 2018–19 season.

== History ==
=== Background ===
==== RFU Knockout Cup ====
From 1971 to 2005, English clubs played in the RFU Knockout Cup. At its formation, it was the highest honour that a club could win, as there were no nationally organised leagues until merit leagues were introduced in 1984, followed by the full national league pyramid in 1987. It was an open tournament to any club that was a member of the Rugby Football Union.

=== 2005–2018: Anglo-Welsh Cup ===
==== 2005–09: Initial format ====
Starting in the 2005–06 season, the Powergen Anglo-Welsh Cup was formed as a successor tournament to the Knockout Cup. It continued to be organised by the RFU, in co-operation with the Welsh Rugby Union, but featured a new format including only the twelve teams from the Guinness Premiership and the four regional Welsh sides which competed in the Celtic League. Teams from the English RFU Championship and below played in the Powergen National Trophy.

The Welsh clubs' inclusion initially caused them to be expelled from the Celtic League in June 2005. Scottish and Irish officials were angered that the Welsh regions had apparently consented to Powergen Cup fixtures on the same weekend as league matches. By the end of the month, a compromise was reached and the regions were readmitted, with the Welsh sides giving a "substantial financial contribution" and committing to mid-week league fixtures.

In place of the knock-out format, the 16 sides were placed in four pools with three English clubs and one Welsh region in each. The pool stages for this initial format featured one game against each team, followed by semi-finals and a final at Twickenham Stadium. The pools remained the same for the following season, with home and away fixtures reversed and the club relegated from the Premiership's place taken by the club promoted from the Championship.

In addition to increased TV revenue (the revised Powergen Cup had a new broadcasting agreement with BBC Sport) and a possible boost to matchday income, the Powergen Cup also offered its winner, if they were a Premiership club, qualification to the even more lucrative Heineken Cup competition. As base compensation, all 16 Powergen clubs were guaranteed £250,000 each, with a prize fund of up to £200,000 available to semi-finalists.

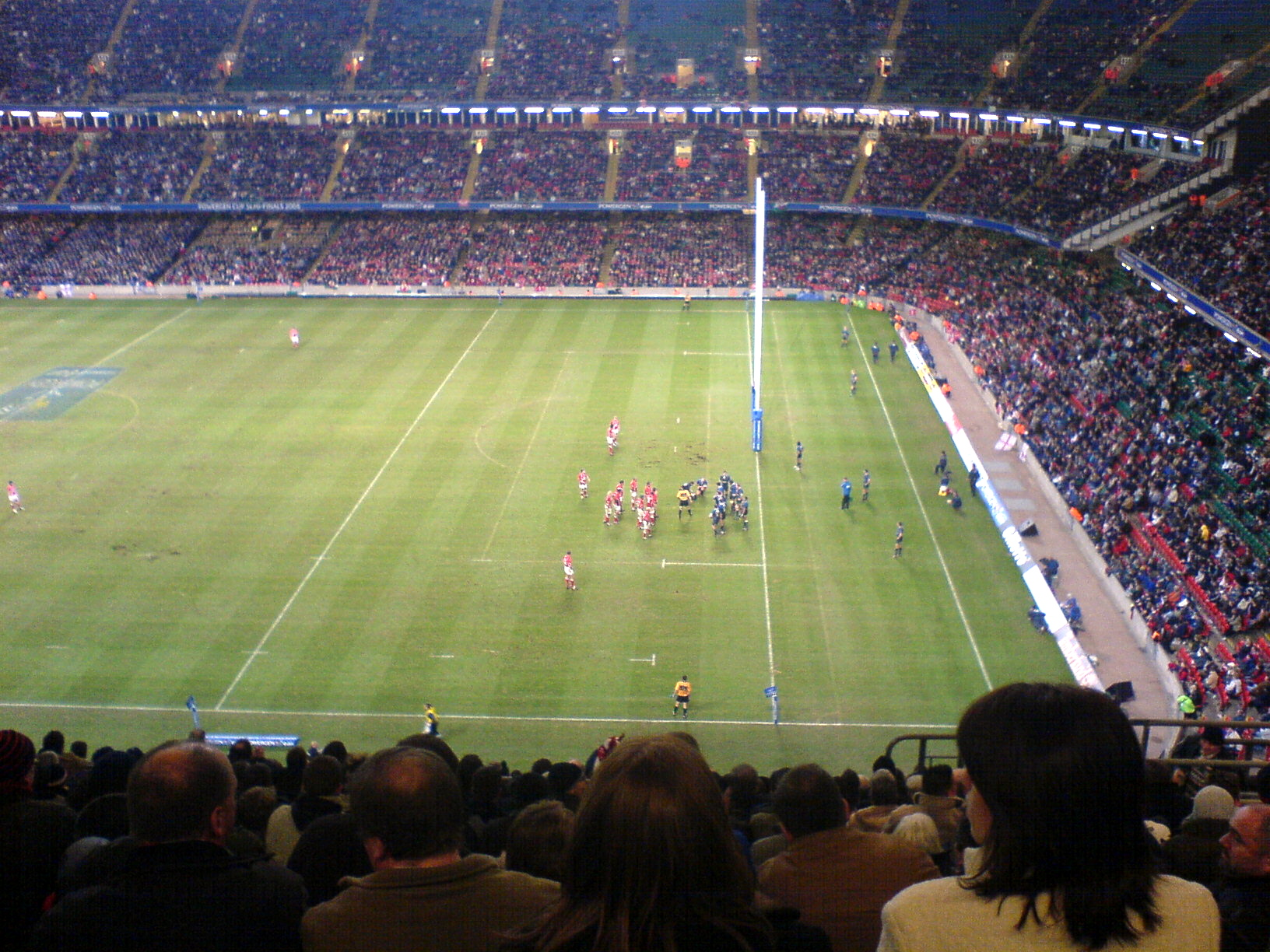
The Scarlets playing Bath at the Millennium Stadium

Interest in the Powergen Cup was high during the first two rounds. Over 100,000 spectators attended matches, while the television audience peaked at 1.2 million on BBC2 for the match between the Newcastle Falcons and the Llanelli Scarlets. Overall, the 2005–06 cup drew a 12% attendance boost in the group stages over the previous year's competition.

Powergen withdrew all of its rugby sponsorship after the conclusion of the first competition. EDF Energy took over as title sponsor for the 2006–07 tournament, renaming the tournament as the EDF Energy Cup in a deal that ran until 2009.

==== 2009–18: Final Format ====
Insurers Liverpool Victoria became sponsors for the 2009–10 competition, rebranding the tournament as the LV= Cup until 2015.

The structure of the competition was altered at this time. It continued to consist of four pools, each consisting of three English and one Welsh team. However, the new format saw teams guaranteed two home and two away pool matches, with teams in Pools 1 and 4 playing each other and teams in Pools 2 and 3 playing each other. Early rounds of the competition now took place on international fixture dates during the Autumn Internationals and Six Nations Championship, with the aim of allowing teams to develop their squad players. It also saw the final move away from Twickenham for the first time, with Worcester's Sixways Stadium hosting in its place. The final would continue to be played at various pre-arranged club grounds in the following years.

There was no competition in the 2015–16 season due to the 2015 Rugby World Cup being played in England, which resulted in the late start to the 2015–16 English Premiership season.

The competition returned in the 2016–17 season, known simply as the Anglo-Welsh Cup, with BT Sport taking over the live TV rights from Sky Sports and highlights shown on Channel 5.

=== 2018–present: Premiership Rugby Cup ===
In the 2017–18 Anglo-Welsh Cup, all four of the Welsh regions finished bottom of their pools. In May 2018, the Welsh Rugby Union announced that they were going to be setting up a Welsh under-23s competition for their regions and would thus be unable to commit to Anglo-Welsh Cup games. On 10 May, Premiership Rugby Limited, which organises the English top flight, then announced that the Anglo-Welsh Cup would be replaced by the Premiership Rugby Cup, which would be solely for the English Premiership clubs. The Cup was created to continue to allow younger English Premiership players to compete in more matches at Premiership stadiums.

== List of winners ==
Anglo-Welsh Cup
Season	Winners	Score	Runners-up	Venue	Attendance	Ref
2005–06	(England) London Wasps	26–10	(Wales) Llanelli Scarlets	Twickenham	57,212	
2006–07	(England) Leicester Tigers	41–35	(Wales) Ospreys	Twickenham	43,312	
2007–08	(Wales) Ospreys	23–6	(England) Leicester Tigers	Twickenham	65,756	
2008–09	(Wales) Cardiff Blues	50–12	(England) Gloucester	Twickenham	54,899	
2009–10	(England) Northampton Saints	30–24	(England) Gloucester	Sixways Stadium, Worcester	12,024	
2010–11	(England) Gloucester	34–7	(England) Newcastle Falcons	Franklin's Gardens, Northampton	6,848	
2011–12	(England) Leicester Tigers	26–14	(England) Northampton Saints	Sixways Stadium, Worcester	11,895	
2012–13	(England) Harlequins	32–14	(England) Sale Sharks	Sixways Stadium, Worcester	8,100	
2013–14	(England) Exeter Chiefs	15–8	(England) Northampton Saints	Sandy Park, Exeter	10,744	
2014–15	(England) Saracens	23–20	(England) Exeter Chiefs	Franklin's Gardens, Northampton	8,865	
2015–16	No competition due to Rugby World Cup					
2016–17	(England) Leicester Tigers	16–12	(England) Exeter Chiefs	Twickenham Stoop, London	6,834	
2017–18	(England) Exeter Chiefs	28–11	(England) Bath	Kingsholm Stadium, Gloucester	8,074	

=== List of champions ===
#	Team	Wins	Years
1	Leicester	3	2007, 2012, 2017
2	Exeter	2	2014, 2018
3=	Cardiff	1	2009
3=	Gloucester	1	2011
3=	Harlequins	1	2013
3=	Northampton	1	2010
3=	Ospreys	1	2008
3=	Saracens	1	2015
3=	Wasps	1	2006

== See also ==
- RFU Championship Cup
- EDF Energy Trophy
- RFU Intermediate Cup
- RFU Senior Vase
- RFU Junior Vase
- Rugby union in England
