= Gareth Bowen =

Welsh rugby union player (born 1979)

- Born: 20 June 1979 (age 47) Aberdare, Wales
- Height: 174 cm (5 ft 9 in)
- Weight: 81 kg (179 lb)

Rugby union career
- Position: Fly-half
Senior career
Years	Team	Apps	(Points)
1997–1999	Bridgend		
1999	Bedford		
1999–2001	Bristol		
2001–2006	Llanelli	55	(401)
2003–2006	Llanelli Scarlets	66	(562)
2006–2007	Neath		
2007–2008	Aurillac		
2008–2009	Bridgend		
2009–2010	Ebbw Vale		
2010–2012	Newport	35	(240)
International career
Years	Team	Apps	(Points)
- Wales U21
2001	Wales 'A'		
National sevens team
Years	Team		Comps
2001–2002	Wales Sevens		

Gareth Bowen (born 20 June 1979) is a Welsh former rugby union footballer who played as a fly-half. Born in Aberdare, he played for Bridgend, Bedford, Bristol, Llanelli, Scarlets, Neath, Aurillac, Ebbw Vale and Newport.

== Career ==
After spending time with Bridgend and in England with Bedford and Bristol, Wales under-21 international Bowen joined Llanelli for the inaugural season of the Celtic League in 2001 and shared duties at fly-half with Stephen Jones. His performances earned him a call-up to both the Wales Sevens and Wales 'A' teams in October 2001, although in February 2002, he had to fly home from Sevens duty in New Zealand to cover for Jones who had been ordered to miss a game against Ebbw Vale to guard him against injury ahead of the 2002 Six Nations.

In 2003, regional rugby came to Wales and Bowen and Jones were named as the two fly-halves for the Llanelli-based region, the Llanelli Scarlets; however, the start of the 2003–04 season coincided with the 2003 Rugby World Cup in Australia, which meant Jones was unavailable and Bowen started at fly-half for the first 10 games in the history of the Scarlets. Jones returned from the World Cup as first-choice, but the 2004 Six Nations Championship meant Bowen had another run in the team before the end of the season and he signed a new contract with the Scarlets in April 2004. Jones left for French side Clermont in the summer of 2004, and failed moves for New Zealander Andrew Mehrtens and France's Gérald Merceron meant Bowen was now considered the Scarlets' first-choice fly-half, although the newly signed Arwel Thomas and the young Ceiron Thomas challenged him for the starting position at various points in the 2004–05 season.

In 2005–06, the Scarlets signed United States international Mike Hercus as competition for Bowen, limiting Bowen to just 10 starts during the season, although in October 2005, he was included as part of Wales' training squad for the 2005 Autumn internationals. The return of Stephen Jones to the Scarlets and the emergence of Ceiron Thomas saw Bowen omitted from the Scarlets' 38-man squad for the 2006–07 Heineken Cup; his only appearance for the region in 2006–07 came as a replacement in a pre-season friendly against Gloucester in August 2006, and he was limited to eight competitive appearances for Llanelli RFC before his contract was terminated in November 2006. Despite interest from Leeds Tykes, he was almost immediately signed by Neath, who were seeking a replacement at fly-half for James Hook, who had been promoted to the Ospreys regional side.

Bowen left Wales for France in the summer of 2007, signing for second-division side Aurillac but returned to sign for his first club, Bridgend, in July 2008. A year later, he moved to Ebbw Vale before joining Newport in 2010, where he spent two years before retiring.

== Personal life ==
He is the father of Welsh rugby union player Tom Bowen.
