= 2005–06 Ulster Rugby season =

- Ground: Ravenhill Stadium (Capacity: 12,500)
- Coach: Mark McCall
- Captain(s): Simon Best, Justin Harrison
- Top scorer: David Humphreys (267)
- Most tries: Tommy Bowe (11)
- League(s): Heineken Cup (3rd in pool); Celtic League (champions)

In the 2005–06 season, Ulster were Celtic League champions for the first time. This was their eleventh season under professionalism, and their second under head coach Mark McCall. They also competed in the Heineken Cup.

In pre-season, Gary Longwell replaced Maurice Field as head of the academy. Scrum-half Neil Doak retired as a player and became a High Performance Coach with the academy. Flanker and captain Andy Ward also retired. New signings included Australian international lock Justin Harrison, and Irish-qualified New Zealand-born scrum-half Isaac Boss. Prop Justin Fitzpatrick returned from Castres Olympique.

Ulster finished top of the table in the Celtic League. Tommy Bowe was the league's top try scorer with ten. David Humphreys was second top points scorer with 229, and second leading marksman with 81 successful goal kicks. Justin Harrison was joint top of the appearances table with 20. In the Heineken Cup, they finished third in Pool 4, failing to qualify for the knockout stage.

Players who made their debuts this season include flanker Stephen Ferris, prop Declan Fitzpatrick, centre Andrew Trimble, and lock Ryan Caldwell, Andrew Trimble was Ulster's Player of the Year, and IRUPA Newcomer of the Year. Neil Best won the IRUPA Unsung Hero award.

== Staff ==
| Position | Name | Nationality |
|---|---|---|
| Director of Coaching | Mark McCall | Ireland |
| Assistant coach (forwards) | Allen Clarke | Ireland |
| Assistant coach (defence) | Neil Kelly | England |

== Squad ==
=== Senior squad ===
==== Players in ====
- (New Zealand) Isaac Boss from (New Zealand) Waikato
- (Ireland) Ryan Caldwell from (Ireland) Dungannon
- (Ireland) Justin Fitzpatrick from (France) Castres Olympique
- (Australia) Justin Harrison from (Australia) New South Wales
- (England) Henry Head from (Ireland) Ballymena
- (Ireland) Andrew Trimble from (Ireland) Ballymena

==== Promoted from academy ====
- (Ireland) John Andress
- (Ireland) Stephen Ferris
- (Ireland) Oisin Hennessey
- (Ireland) Lewis Stevenson

==== Players out ====
- (Ireland) Tim Barker to (Scotland) Glasgow
- (Ireland) Gary Brown released
- (Ireland) Neil Doak retired
- (Ireland) Gary Longwell retired
- (Ireland) Seamus Mallon to (England) Northampton Saints
- (Ireland) Ronan McCormack to (Ireland) Leinster
- (New Zealand) Matt Mustchin to (Scotland) Edinburgh
- (South Africa) Gavin Pfister released
- (Ireland) Simon Shawe released
- (Ireland) Andy Ward retired

Ulster Rugby squad
| **Props**: (Ireland) **Simon Best** (22 apps, 22 starts, 5 pts); (Ireland) Bryan Young (23 apps, 17 starts); (Ireland) **Justin Fitzpatrick** (19 apps, 11 starts); (Ireland) Declan Fitzpatrick (4 apps, 2 starts); (Australia) **Rod Moore** (1 app); (Ireland) John Andress (no apps); **Hookers**: (Ireland) Rory Best (23 apps, 21 starts, 15 pts); (Ireland) Nigel Brady (9 apps, 3 starts); (Ireland) **Paul Shields** (8 apps, 2 starts); **Locks**: (Australia) **Justin Harrison** (26 apps, 26 starts, 10 pts); (Ireland) **Matt McCullough** (23 apps, 23 starts, 10 pts); (New Zealand) Rowan Frost* (11 apps, 2 starts); (Ireland) Ryan Caldwell (8 apps, 1 start); (England) Henry Head (1 app); (Ireland) Lewis Stevenson (no apps) | **Back row**: (Ireland) **Roger Wilson** (26 apps, 26 starts, 20 pts); (Ireland) Neil Best (25 apps, 24 starts, 30 pts); (Ireland) Neil McMillan (25 apps, 16 starts, 10 pts); (Ireland) Stephen Ferris (17 apps, 11 starts, 5 pts); (Ireland) Campbell Feather (4 apps, 1 start); (Ireland) Oisin Hennessy (no apps); **Scrum-halves**: (New Zealand) Isaac Boss* (21 apps, 14 starts, 15 pts); (Ireland) **Kieran Campbell** (19 apps, 12 starts); (New Zealand) Reece Spee* (1 app); **Fly-halves**: (Ireland) **David Humphreys** (22 apps, 22 starts, 267 pts); (Australia) Adam Larkin (7 apps, 3 starts) | **Centres**: (Ireland) Andrew Trimble (22 apps, 22 starts, 42 pts); (Ireland) **Kevin Maggs** (18 apps, 16 starts, 5 pts); (New Zealand) **Paul Steinmetz** (17 apps, 15 starts, 48 pts); (Ireland) **Paddy Wallace** (11 apps, 7 starts, 24 pts); (Ireland) **Jonny Bell** (8 apps, 5 starts); (New Zealand) Shane Stewart (no apps); **Wings**: (Ireland) **Tommy Bowe** (23 apps, 23 starts, 55 pts); (Ireland) **James Topping** (15 apps, 11 starts, 10 pts); (Ireland) Andy Maxwell (12 apps, 11 starts, 45 pts); (Ireland) **Tyrone Howe** (5 apps, 5 pts); **Fullbacks**: (Ireland) Bryn Cunningham (21 apps, 21 starts, 10 pts); (Ireland) Scott Young (no apps) |
(c) denotes the team captain, **Bold** denotes internationally capped players.^{*} denotes players qualified to play for Ireland on residency or dual nationality.

=== Academy squad ===
==== Players in ====
- (Ireland) Darren Cave
- (Ireland) Paul Marshall
- (Ireland) David Pollock
- (Ireland) Stuart Philpott
- (Ireland) Mark Kettyle

==== Players out ====
- (Ireland) Gary Maxwell
- (Ireland) Thomas Horner
- (Ireland) Glenn Moore
- (Ireland) Mark Scott
- (Ireland) Jamie McGrugan
- (Ireland) Blair Clements

Academy squad
| **Props**: (Ireland) John Andress; (Ireland) Niall Conlon; **Hookers**: (Ireland) Stuart Philpott (1); **Locks**: (Ireland) Lewis Stevenson | **Back row**: (Ireland) Chris Henry; (Ireland) Oisin Hennessy; (Ireland) David Pollock (1); **Scrum-halves**: (Ireland) Paul Marshall (1); **Fly-halves**: (Ireland) Gareth Steenson | **Centres**: (Ireland) Darren Cave (1); (Ireland) Stuart Megaw; (Ireland) Glen Telford (3); **Wings**: (Ireland) Paul McKenzie; **Fullbacks**: (Ireland) Mark Kettyle (1) |

== Season record ==
| Competition | Played | Won | Drawn | Lost | PF | PA | PD | TF | TA |
|---|---|---|---|---|---|---|---|---|---|
| 2005-06 Heineken Cup | 6 | 3 | 0 | 3 | 126 | 111 | 15 | 15 | 13 |
| 2005-06 Celtic League | 20 | 15 | 1 | 4 | 510 | 347 | 163 | 49 | 31 |
| Total | 26 | 18 | 1 | 7 | 636 | 458 | 178 | 64 | 44 |

== 2005–06 Heineken Cup ==
=== Pool 4 ===
| Team | P | W | D | L | Tries for | Tries against | Try diff | Points for | Points against | Points diff | TB | LB | Pts |
|---|---|---|---|---|---|---|---|---|---|---|---|---|---|
| (France) Biarritz (2) | 6 | 5 | 0 | 1 | 24 | 10 | +14 | 182 | 93 | +89 | 4 | 0 | 24 |
| (England) Saracens | 6 | 4 | 0 | 2 | 12 | 13 | −1 | 128 | 129 | −1 | 1 | 0 | 17 |
| (Ireland) Ulster | 6 | 3 | 0 | 3 | 15 | 13 | +2 | 126 | 111 | +15 | 2 | 0 | 14 |
| (Italy) Benetton Treviso | 6 | 0 | 0 | 6 | 13 | 28 | −15 | 104 | 207 | −103 | 2 | 1 | 3 |

| 21 October 2005 | Ulster (Ireland) | 27–0 | (Italy) Benetton Treviso | Ravenhill, Belfast |
| 19:30 | Try: Wilson 20'; N. Best 57'; McMillan 75'; Maggs; Con: David Humphreys (2) 20', 75'; Pen: David Humphreys 6'; Cards: J, Fitzpatrick (yellow card) 28'; Wilson (yellow card) 40+1' | Report | Cards: F. Ongaro (yellow card) 40+2' | Attendance: 12,252; Referee: Jean-Pierre Matheu |
| Ulster lineup: 1. Justin Fitzpatrick, 2. Rory Best, 3. Simon Best, 4. Justin Harrison, 5. Matt McCullough, 6. Neil Best, 7. Neil McMillan, 8. Roger Wilson, 9. Isaac Boss, 10. David Humphreys, 11. James Topping, 12. Kevin Maggs, 13. Andrew Trimble, 14. Tommy Bowe, 15. Bryn Cunningham.; Replacements: 16. Nigel Brady, 17. Bryan Young (for Wilson 29-39), 18. Ryan Caldwell (for Harrison 79), 19. Campbell Feather, 20. Reece Spee (for Boss 22), 21. Paddy Wallace, 22. Paul Steinmetz (for Topping 59). | | | | Attendance: 12,252; Referee: Jean-Pierre Matheu |

| 29 October 2005 | Biarritz (France) | 33–19 | (Ireland) Ulster | Parc des Sports Aguiléra, Biarritz |
| 16:00 | Try: Badabé (2) 1', 14'; Bălan 4'; Gobelet 73'; Con: Yachvili (2) 15', 73'; Pen: Yachvili (2) 40', 65'; Drop: Peyrelongue 80' +5' | Report | Try: N. Best 18'; S. Best 59'; Pen: David Humphreys (3) 7', 32', 68' | Attendance: 6,000; Referee: Nigel Whitehouse |
| Ulster lineup: 1. Justin Fitzpatrick, 2. Rory Best, 3. Simon Best, 4. Justin Harrison, 5. Matt McCullough, 6. Neil Best, 7. Neil McMillan, 8. Roger Wilson, 9. Kieran Campbell, 10. David Humphreys, 11. James Topping, 12. Andrew Trimble, 13. Kevin Maggs, 14. Tommy Bowe, 15. Bryn Cunningham.; Replacements: 16. Nigel Brady, 17. Bryan Young (for Fitzpatrick 71), 18. Ryan Caldwell, 19. Campbell Feather (for McMillan 80), 20. Reece Spee, 21. Paddy Wallace, 22. Paul Steinmetz (for Topping 47). | | | | Attendance: 6,000; Referee: Nigel Whitehouse |

| 9 December 2005 | Ulster (Ireland) | 19–10 | (England) Saracens | Ravenhill, Belfast |
| 19:30 | Try: R. Best 78'; Con: David Humphreys 79'; Pen: David Humphreys (4) 25', 55', 71', 77' | Report | Try: Jackson 14'; Con: Jackson 15'; Pen: Jackson 61'; Cards: Castaignède (yellow card) 70'; Cairns (yellow card) 76' | Attendance: 12,300; Referee: Eric Darriere |
| Ulster lineup: 1. Bryan Young, 2. Rory Best, 3. Simon Best, 4. Justin Harrison, 5. Matt McCullough, 6. Neil Best, 7. Neil McMillan, 8. Roger Wilson, 9. Kieran Campbell, 10. David Humphreys, 11. Paul Steinmetz, 12. Andrew Trimble, 13. Kevin Maggs, 14. Tommy Bowe, 15. Bryn Cunningham.; Replacements: 16. Nigel Brady, 17. Rod Moore, 18. Ryan Caldwell, 19. Stephen Ferris (for McMillan 40), 20. Isaac Boss (for Campbell 72), 21. Adam Larkin, 22. James Topping. | | | | Attendance: 12,300; Referee: Eric Darriere |

| 17 December 2005 | Saracens (England) | 18–10 | (Ireland) Ulster | Vicarage Road, Watford |
| 13:00 | Try: Skirving 3'; Yates 40' +4'; Con: Jackson 4'; Pen: Jackson (2) 67', 80' + 5'; Cards: Yates (yellow card) 21' | Report | Try: Bowe 5'; Con: David Humphreys 6'; Pen: David Humphreys 78' | Attendance: 8,571; Referee: Joël Jutge |
| Ulster lineup: 1. Bryan Young, 2. Rory Best, 3. Simon Best, 4. Justin Harrison, 5. Matt McCullough, 6. Neil Best, 7. Neil McMillan, 8. Roger Wilson, 9. Kieran Campbell, 10. David Humphreys, 11. Paul Steinmetz, 12. Andrew Trimble, 13. Kevin Maggs, 14. Tommy Bowe, 15. Bryn Cunningham.; Replacements: 16. Nigel Brady (for R. Best 80), 17. Justin Fitzpatrick (for Young 57), 18. Ryan Caldwell (for Ferris 70), 19. Stephen Ferris (for N. Best 38), 20. Isaac Boss (for Campbell 57), 21. Adam Larkin, 22. James Topping. | | | | Attendance: 8,571; Referee: Joël Jutge |

| 13 January 2006 | Ulster (Ireland) | 8–24 | (France) Biarritz | Ravenhill, Belfast |
| 19:30 | Try: Best 5'; Pen: David Humphreys 51'; Cards: Harrison (yellow card) 80+6' | Report | Try: Bobo 30'; Bălan 62'; Con: Yachvili 62'; Pen: Yachvili (3) 11', 72' 79'; Drop: Peyrelongue 80' + 1'; Cards: Dusautoir (yellow card) 37'; Thion (yellow card) 80+6' | Attendance: 12,300; Referee: Dave Pearson |
| Ulster lineup: 1. Bryan Young, 2. Rory Best, 3. Simon Best, 4. Justin Harrison, 5. Matt McCullough, 6. Neil Best, 7. Stephen Ferris, 8. Roger Wilson, 9. Isaac Boss, 10. David Humphreys, 11. Andrew Trimble, 12. Paul Steinmetz, 13. Kevin Maggs, 14. Tommy Bowe, 15. Bryn Cunningham.; Replacements: 16. Nigel Brady, 17. Justin Fitzpatrick (for Young 57), 18. Rowan Frost (for McCullough 70), 19. Neil McMillan (for Ferris 68), 20. Kieran Campbell, 21. Adam Larkin (for Humphreys 61), 22. James Topping (for Maggs 77). | | | | Attendance: 12,300; Referee: Dave Pearson |

| 21 January 2006 | Benetton Treviso (Italy) | 26–43 | (Ireland) Ulster | Stadio Comunale di Monigo, Treviso |
| 16:00 | Try: Tejeda (2) 39', 40' +3'; Williams 42'; Palmer 67'; Con: Goosen (3) 39', 40' + 3', 67'; Cards: Orlando (yellow card) 13' | Report | Try: Maxwell (3) 3', 21', 33'; Trimble (2) 52', 79'; Wallace 60'; Con: Steinmetz (5) 4', 22', 34', 52' 79'; Pen: Steinmetz 41'; Cards: Trimble (yellow card) 40+2'; N. Best (yellow card) 80+2' | Attendance: 3,500; Referee: Wayne Barnes |
| Ulster lineup: 1. Justin Fitzpatrick, 2. Nigel Brady, 3. Bryan Young, 4. Justin Harrison, 5. Matt McCullough, 6. Neil Best, 7. Stephen Ferris, 8. Roger Wilson, 9. Isaac Boss, 10. Adam Larkin, 11. Andy Maxwell, 12. Paul Steinmetz, 13. Andrew Trimble, 14. James Topping, 15. Tommy Bowe.; Replacements: 16. Paul Shields (for Brady 56), 17. Rod Moore (for Young 70), 18. Rowan Frost (for McCullough 78), 19. Neil McMillan (for Ferris 61), 20. Kieran Campbell (for Boss 50), 21. Paddy Wallace (for Larkin 60), 22. Jonny Bell (for Topping 68). | | | | Attendance: 3,500; Referee: Wayne Barnes |

== 2005-06 Celtic League ==
| | Team | Pld | W | D | L | PF | PA | PD | TF | TA | Try bonus | Losing bonus | Pts |
|---|---|---|---|---|---|---|---|---|---|---|---|---|---|
| 1 | (Ireland) Ulster | 20 | 15 | 1 | 4 | 510 | 347 | +163 | 49 | 31 | 3 | 2 | 75 |
| 2 | (Ireland) Leinster | 20 | 14 | 0 | 6 | 545 | 427 | +118 | 59 | 45 | 8 | 2 | 74 |
| 3 | (Ireland) Munster | 20 | 12 | 0 | 8 | 439 | 372 | +67 | 49 | 42 | 7 | 3 | 66 |
| 4 | (Wales) Cardiff Blues | 20 | 11 | 0 | 9 | 475 | 389 | +86 | 51 | 38 | 6 | 5 | 63 |
| 5 | (Scotland) Edinburgh Gunners | 20 | 11 | 0 | 9 | 418 | 415 | +3 | 48 | 45 | 5 | 3 | 60 |
| 6 | (Wales) Llanelli Scarlets | 20 | 10 | 1 | 9 | 418 | 402 | +16 | 49 | 37 | 3 | 4 | 57 |
| 7 | (Wales) Ospreys | 20 | 11 | 0 | 9 | 381 | 409 | −28 | 33 | 38 | 1 | 2 | 55 |
| 8 | (Wales) Newport Gwent Dragons | 20 | 7 | 0 | 13 | 355 | 456 | −101 | 40 | 51 | 2 | 7 | 45 |
| 9 | (Scotland) Border Reivers | 20 | 7 | 0 | 13 | 386 | 501 | −115 | 39 | 59 | 1 | 7 | 44 |
| 10 | (Ireland) Connacht | 20 | 6 | 0 | 14 | 325 | 466 | −141 | 28 | 51 | 1 | 4 | 37 |
| 11 | (Scotland) Glasgow Warriors | 20 | 5 | 0 | 15 | 371 | 439 | −68 | 39 | 47 | 2 | 7 | 37 |
Under the standard bonus point system, points are awarded as follows: 4 points for a win; 2 points for a draw; 1 bonus point for scoring 4 tries (or more) (Try bonus); 1 bonus point for losing by 7 points (or fewer) (Losing bonus)
Due to the uneven number of participating teams, each team had two free weekends and were awarded 4 match points each time.
Source: RaboDirect PRO12

| 9 September 2005 | Cardiff Blues (Wales) | 22–25 | (Ireland) Ulster | Cardiff Arms Park |
| 19:10 | Try: Morgan; Con: Robinson; Pen: Robinson (5) | Report | Try: Bowe; Con: David Humphreys; Pen: David Humphreys (5); Drop: David Humphreys | Attendance: 5,784; Referee: Rob Dickson |
| Ulster lineup: 1. Justin Fitzpatrick, 2. Paul Shields, 3. Simon Best, 4. Justin Harrison, 5. Matt McCullough, 6. Neil Best, 7. Neil McMillan, 8. Roger Wilson, 9. Kieran Campbell, 10. David Humphreys, 11. Andrew Trimble, 12. Paul Steinmetz, 13. Kevin Maggs, 14. Tommy Bowe, 15. Paddy Wallace.; Replacements: 16. Rory Best (for Shields), 17. Bryan Young, 18. Rowan Frost ( for McCullough), 19. Campbell Feather, 20. Paul Marshall, 21. Adam Larkin, 22. James Topping. | | | | Attendance: 5,784; Referee: Rob Dickson |

| 16 September 2005 | Ulster (Ireland) | 30–23 | (Scotland) Edinburgh Gunners | Ravenhill, Belfast |
| 19:30 | Try: Bowe; Trimble; Con: Humphreys; Pen: Humphreys (6) | Report | Try: Dewey; Leonelli; Con: Paterson (2); Pen: Paterson (2); Drop: Paterson | Attendance: 7,799; Referee: Phil Fear |
| Ulster lineup: 1. Justin Fitzpatrick, 2. Paul Shields, 3. Simon Best, 4. Justin Harrison, 5. Matt McCullough, 6. Neil Best, 7. Neil McMillan, 8. Roger Wilson, 9. Kieran Campbell, 10. David Humphreys, 11. Andrew Trimble, 12. Paul Steinmetz, 13. Kevin Maggs, 14. Tommy Bowe, 15. Paddy Wallace.; Replacements: 16. Rory Best (for Shields), 17. Bryan Young (for Fitzpatrick), 18. Rowan Frost (for McCullough), 19. Campbell Feather, 20. Reece Spee, 21. Adam Larkin, 22. James Topping (for Trimble). | | | | Attendance: 7,799; Referee: Phil Fear |

| 24 September 2005 | Newport Gwent Dragons (Wales) | 19–22 | (Ireland) Ulster | Rodney Parade, Newport |
| 17:30 | Try: Gough; Con: Warlow; Pen: Warlow (3); Drop: Warlow | Report | Try: N. Best (2); Trimble; Con: Wallace (2); Pen: Wallace; Cards: McCullough (yellow card) | Attendance: 5,112; Referee: Malcolm Changleng |
| Ulster lineup: 1. Justin Fitzpatrick, 2. Rory Best, 3. Simon Best, 4. Justin Harrison, 5. Matt McCullough, 6. Neil Best, 7. Neil McMillan, 8. Roger Wilson, 9. Kieran Campbell, 10. Adam Larkin, 11. James Topping, 12. Kevin Maggs, 13. Andrew Trimble, 14. Tommy Bowe, 15. Paddy Wallace.; Replacements: 16. Paul Shields, 17. Bryan Young (for Fitzpatrick), 18. Rowan Frost, 19. Campbell Feather, 20. Reece Spee, 21. Shane Stewart, 22. Tyrone Howe (for Topping). | | | | Attendance: 5,112; Referee: Malcolm Changleng |

| 1 October 2005 | Leinster (Ireland) | 30–23 | (Ireland) Ulster | Donnybrook, Dublin |
| 17:30 | Try: Hickie; Potts; Con: Contepomi; Pen: Contepomi (6) | Report | Try: Wallace; Best; Con: David Humphreys (2); Pen: David Humphreys (3); Cards: B. Young (yellow card) | Attendance: 6,500; Referee: Olan Trevor |
| Ulster lineup: 1. Justin Fitzpatrick, 2. Rory Best, 3. Simon Best, 4. Justin Harrison, 5. Matt McCullough, 6. Neil Best, 7. Neil McMillan, 8. Roger Wilson, 9. Kieran Campbell, 10. David Humphreys, 11. James Topping, 12. Andrew Trimble, 13. Kevin Maggs, 14. Tommy Bowe, 15. Paddy Wallace.; Replacements: 16. Paul Shields (for R. Best), 17. Bryan Young (for Fitzpatrick), 18. Rowan Frost (for McCullough, 19. Campbell Feather, 20. Reece Spee, 21. Adam Larkin, 22. Tyrone Howe (for Topping). | | | | Attendance: 6,500; Referee: Olan Trevor |

| 7 October 2005 | Ulster (Ireland) | 36–10 | (Ireland) Connacht | Ravenhill, Belfast |
| 19:10 | Try: R. Best; Bowe; Topping; McCullough; Trimble; Con: Humphreys (2); Cunningham; Wallace; Pen: Cunningham; Cards: Humphreys (yellow card) | Report | Try: Matthews; Con: Robinson; Pen: Warwick; Cards: Fogarty (yellow card) | Attendance: 9,546; Referee: Alain Rolland |
| Ulster lineup: 1. Justin Fitzpatrick, 2. Rory Best, 3. Simon Best, 4. Justin Harrison, 5. Matt McCullough, 6. Neil Best, 7. Neil McMillan, 8. Roger Wilson, 9. Kieran Campbell, 10. David Humphreys, 11. James Topping, 12. Andrew Trimble, 13. Kevin Maggs, 14. Tommy Bowe, 15. Bryn Cunningham.; Replacements: 16. Paul Shields (for R. Best), 17. Bryan Young (for Fitzpatrick), 18. Rowan Frost (for Harrison), 19. Campbell Feather (for McMillan), 20. Isaac Boss (for Campbell), 21. Paddy Wallace (for Humphreys), 22. Tyrone Howe (for Topping). | | | | Attendance: 9,546; Referee: Alain Rolland |

| 15 October 2005 | Border Reivers (Scotland) | 0–27 | (Ireland) Ulster | Netherdale, Galashiels |
| 19:30 | Cards: MacDougall (yellow card); Cusiter (yellow card) | Report | Try: Topping; N. Best; Boss; Con: Humphreys (3); Pen: Humphreys (2) | Attendance: 1,857; Referee: Phil Fear |
| Ulster lineup: 1. Justin Fitzpatrick, 2. Rory Best, 3. Simon Best, 4. Justin Harrison, 5. Matt McCullough, 6. Neil Best, 7. Neil McMillan, 8. Roger Wilson, 9. Kieran Campbell, 10. David Humphreys, 11. James Topping, 12. Andrew Trimble, 13. Kevin Maggs, 14. Tommy Bowe, 15. Bryn Cunningham.; Replacements: 16. Paul Shields (for R. Best), 17. Bryan Young (for Fitzpatrick), 18. Rowan Frost (for McCullough), 19. Stephen Ferris (for Wilson), 20. Isaac Boss (for Campbell), 21. Paddy Wallace (for Cunningham), 22. Andy Maxwell (for Trimble). | | | | Attendance: 1,857; Referee: Phil Fear |

| 4 November 2005 | Ulster (Ireland) | 12–20 | (Wales) Ospreys | Ravenhill, Belfast |
| 19:10 | Pen: Steinmetz (4) | Report | Try: Spice; Pen: Connor (4); Drop: Connor | Attendance: 9,310; Referee: Ian Heard |
| Ulster lineup: 1. Justin Fitzpatrick, 2. Nigel Brady, 3. Bryan Young, 4. Justin Harrison, 5. Ryan Caldwell, 6. Campbell Feather, 7. Neil McMillan, 8. Roger Wilson, 9. Isaac Boss, 10. Paddy Wallace, 11. Andy Maxwell, 12. Paul Steinmetz, 13. Kevin Maggs, 14. James Topping, 15. Bryn Cunningham.; Replacements: 16. Declan Fitzpatrick, 17. Rod Moore (for Young), 18. Henry Head (for Caldwell), 19. Stephen Ferris (for Feather), 20. Reece Spee, 21. Adam Larkin (for Wallace), 22. Jonny Bell. | | | | Attendance: 9,310; Referee: Ian Heard |

| 3 December 2005 | Munster (Ireland) | 17–20 | (Ireland) Ulster | Musgrave Park, Cork |
| 19:10 | Try: D. Wallace; Flannery; Con: O'Gara (2); Drop: O'Gara | Report | Try: Bowe; Andrew Trimble; Con: Humphreys (2); Pen: Humphreys (2); Cards: Harrison (yellow card); Boss (yellow card) | Attendance: 6,000; Referee: Alain Rolland |
| Ulster lineup: 1. Bryan Young, 2. Rory Best, 3. Simon Best, 4. Justin Harrison, 5. Matt McCullough, 6. Neil Best, 7. Neil McMillan, 8. Roger Wilson, 9. Kieran Campbell, 10. David Humphreys, 11. Paul Steinmetz, 12. Andrew Trimble, 13. Kevin Maggs, 14. Tommy Bowe, 15. Bryn Cunningham.; Replacements: 16. Nigel Brady, 17. Rod Moore, 18. Ryan Caldwell, 19. Stephen Ferris (for McMillan), 20. Isaac Boss (for Campbell), 21. Adam Larkin, 22. James Topping. | | | | Attendance: 6,000; Referee: Alain Rolland |

| 26 December 2005 | Ulster (Ireland) | 19–24 | (Ireland) Leinster | Ravenhill, Belfast |
| 17:00 | Try: Bowe; Con: Humphreys; Pen: Humphreys (4) | Report | Try: D'Arcy; Dempsey; Con: Contepomi; Pen: Contepomi (4); Cards: Easterby (yellow card) | Attendance: 12,300; Referee: George Clancy |
| Ulster lineup: 1. Bryan Young, 2. Rory Best, 3. Simon Best, 4. Justin Harrison, 5. Matt McCullough, 6. Neil Best, 7. Neil McMillan, 8. Roger Wilson, 9. Isaac Boss, 10. David Humphreys, 11. Paul Steinmetz, 12. Andrew Trimble, 13. Kevin Maggs, 14. Tommy Bowe, 15. Bryn Cunningham.; Replacements: 16. Nigel Brady, 17. Justin Fitzpatrick (for Young), 18. Ryan Caldwell, 19. Stephen Ferris, 20. Kieran Campbell, 21. Adam Larkin, 22. James Topping. | | | | Attendance: 12,300; Referee: George Clancy |

| 31 December 2005 | Connacht (Ireland) | 22–12 | (Ireland) Ulster | The Sportsground, Galway |
| 14:00 | Try: Slemen; Lacey; McPhillips; Con: Slemen (2); Pen: Slemen; Cards: Rigney (yellow card) | Report | Pen: Humphreys (4) | Attendance: 2,100; Referee: Alan Lewis |
| Ulster lineup: 1. Justin Fitzpatrick, 2. Rory Best, 3. Simon Best, 4. Justin Harrison, 5. Rowan Frost, 6. Neil Best, 7. Neil McMillan, 8. Roger Wilson, 9. Kieran Campbell, 10. David Humphreys, 11. Paul Steinmetz, 12. Andrew Trimble, 13. Kevin Maggs, 14. Tommy Bowe, 15. Bryn Cunningham.; Replacements: 16. Nigel Brady, 17. Bryan Young (for Fitzpatrick), 18. Ryan Caldwell (for Frost), 19. Stephen Ferris (for McMillan), 20. Isaac Boss (for Campbell), 21. Adam Larkin, 22. James Topping (for Maggs). | | | | Attendance: 2,100; Referee: Alan Lewis |

| 7 January 2006 | Ulster (Ireland) | 25–23 | (Scotland) Glasgow Warriors | Ravenhill, Belfast |
| 15:30 | Try: Humphreys; Con: Humphreys; Pen: Humphreys (6) | Report | Try: Hamilton; Morrison; Con: Parks (2); Pen: Parks (3) | Attendance: 6,487; Referee: Phil Fear |
| Ulster lineup: 1. Bryan Young, 2. Rory Best, 3. Simon Best, 4. Justin Harrison, 5. Rowan Frost, 6. Neil Best, 7. Neil McMillan, 8. Roger Wilson, 9. Kieran Campbell, 10. David Humphreys, 11. James Topping, 12. Andrew Trimble, 13. Kevin Maggs, 14. Tommy Bowe, 15. Bryn Cunningham.; Replacements: 16. Nigel Brady, 17. Justin Fitzpatrick (for Young), 18. Ryan Caldwell (for Frost), 19. Stephen Ferris (for McMillan), 20. Isaac Boss (for Campbell), 21. Adam Larkin, 22. Jonny Bell. | | | | Attendance: 6,487; Referee: Phil Fear |

| 27 January 2006 | Ulster (Ireland) | 30–13 | (Wales) Llanelli Scarlets | Ravenhill, Belfast |
| 19:30 | Try: Howe; Maxwell; Con: Steinmetz; Pen: Steinmetz (6) | Report | Try: James; Con: Davies (2); Cards: Madden (yellow card); Afeaki (yellow card) | Attendance: 7,986; Referee: Peter Allan |
| Ulster lineup: 1. Justin Fitzpatrick, 2. Nigel Brady, 3. Bryan Young, 4. Justin Harrison, 5. Matt McCullough, 6. Stephen Ferris, 7. Neil McMillan, 8. Roger Wilson, 9. Isaac Boss, 10. Adam Larkin, 11. Andy Maxwell, 12. Paul Steinmetz, 13. Jonny Bell, 14. James Topping, 15. Bryn Cunningham.; Replacements: 16. Paul Shields (for Brady), 17. Rod Moore, 18. Rowan Frost (for McCullough), 19. Neil Best (for Ferris), 20. Kieran Campbell (for Boss), 21. Paddy Wallace, 22. Tyrone Howe (for Maxwell). | | | | Attendance: 7,986; Referee: Peter Allan |

| 17 February 2006 | Edinburgh Gunners (Scotland) | 23–31 | (Ireland) Ulster | Murrayfield, Edinburgh |
| 19:30 | Try: Hodge; Penalty try Con: Hodge (2); Pen: Hodge (3); Cards: Callam (yellow card) | Report | Try: Maxwell (2); Boss; Con: Humphreys (2); Pen: Humphreys (4); Cards: Maxwell (yellow card); S. Best (yellow card) | Attendance: 3,559; Referee: Nigel Whitehouse |
| Ulster lineup: 1. Bryan Young, 2. Rory Best, 3. Simon Best, 4. Justin Harrison, 5. Matt McCullough, 6. Neil Best, 7. Stephen Ferris, 8. Roger Wilson, 9. Isaac Boss, 10. David Humphreys, 11. Andy Maxwell, 12. Paul Steinmetz, 13. Andrew Trimble, 14. James Topping, 15. Bryn Cunningham.; Replacements: 16. Nigel Brady (for R. Best), 17. Justin Fitzpatrick (for Young), 18. Rowan Frost (for McCullough), 19. Neil McMillan (for Ferris), 20. Kieran Campbell (for Boss), 21. Adam Larkin, 22. Jonny Bell (for Topping). | | | | Attendance: 3,559; Referee: Nigel Whitehouse |

| 3 March 2006 | Ulster (Ireland) | 27–3 | (Ireland) Munster | Ravenhill, Belfast |
| 19:35 | Try: Bowe; Steinmetz; McMillan; Wilson; Harrison; Con: Humphreys | Report | Pen: Burke; Cards: Payne (yellow card) | Attendance: 12,300; Referee: Alain Rolland |
| Ulster lineup: 1. Bryan Young, 2. Rory Best, 3. Simon Best, 4. Justin Harrison, 5. Matt McCullough, 6. Neil Best, 7. Stephen Ferris, 8. Roger Wilson, 9. Isaac Boss, 10. David Humphreys, 11. Andy Maxwell, 12. Paul Steinmetz, 13. Jonny Bell, 14. Tommy Bowe, 15. Bryn Cunningham.; Replacements: 16. Nigel Brady (for R. Best), 17. Justin Fitzpatrick (for Young), 18. Ryan Caldwell (for Harrison), 19. Neil McMillan (for Ferris), 20. Kieran Campbell (for Boss), 21. Adam Larkin (for Humphreys), 22. Kevin Maggs (for Bell). | | | | Attendance: 12,300; Referee: Alain Rolland |

| 25 March 2006 | Ulster (Ireland) | 24–17 | (Wales) Newport Gwent Dragons | Ravenhill, Belfast |
| 15:30 | Try: Bowe; Humphreys; Cunningham; Con: Humphreys (3); Pen: Humphreys | Report | Try: Jones; Luscombe; Con: Warlow (2); Pen: Warlow; Cards: Baber (yellow card); Black (yellow card) | Attendance: 7,546; Referee: Malcolm Changleng |
| Ulster lineup: 1. Bryan Young, 2. Rory Best, 3. Simon Best, 4. Justin Harrison, 5. Matt McCullough, 6. Neil Best, 7. Stephen Ferris, 8. Roger Wilson, 9. Isaac Boss, 10. David Humphreys, 11. Andy Maxwell, 12. Paul Steinmetz, 13. Jonny Bell, 14. Tommy Bowe, 15. Bryn Cunningham.; Replacements: 16. Nigel Brady (for R. Best), 17. Justin Fitzpatrick (for Young), 18. Ryan Caldwell (for McCullough), 19. Neil McMillan, 20. Kieran Campbell (for Boss), 21. Adam Larkin (for Ferris), 22. Kevin Maggs (for Steinmetz). | | | | Attendance: 7,546; Referee: Malcolm Changleng |

| 15 April 2006 | Glasgow Warriors (Scotland) | 18–27 | (Ireland) Ulster | Firhill, Glasgow |
| 17:30 | Try: Beattie; O'Hare; Con: Parks; Pen: Parks (2) | Report | Try: Harrison; Boss; Con: Humphreys; Pen: Humphreys (5) | Attendance: 2,240; Referee: Tim Hayes |
| Ulster lineup: 1. Bryan Young, 2. Rory Best, 3. Simon Best, 4. Justin Harrison, 5. Matt McCullough, 6. Neil Best, 7. Stephen Ferris, 8. Roger Wilson, 9. Isaac Boss, 10. David Humphreys, 11. Andy Maxwell, 12. Jonny Bell, 13. Andrew Trimble, 14. Tommy Bowe, 15. Bryn Cunningham.; Replacements: 16. Nigel Brady, 17. Justin Fitzpatrick (for Young), 18. Ryan Caldwell, 19. Neil McMillan (for Ferris), 20. Kieran Campbell, 21. Adam Larkin, 22. James Topping (for Maxwell). | | | | Attendance: 2,240; Referee: Tim Hayes |

| 5 May 2006 | Ulster (Ireland) | 26–17 | (Wales) Cardiff Blues | Ravenhill, Belfast |
| 21:00 | Try: Wilson; Penalty try Con: Humphreys (2); Pen: Humphreys (4) | Report | Try: J. Robinson; Pen: Macleod (4); Cards: N. Robinson (yellow card); Yapp (yellow card) | Attendance: 9,617; Referee: Andy Ireland |
| Ulster lineup: 1. Bryan Young, 2. Rory Best, 3. Simon Best, 4. Justin Harrison, 5. Matt McCullough, 6. Neil Best, 7. Stephen Ferris, 8. Roger Wilson, 9. Isaac Boss, 10. David Humphreys, 11. Andy Maxwell, 12. Paul Steinmetz, 13. Andrew Trimble, 14. Tommy Bowe, 15. Bryn Cunningham.; Replacements: 16. Justin Fitzpatrick, 17. Nigel Brady (for R. Best), 18. Ryan Caldwell, 19. Neil McMillan (for Ferris), 20. Kieran Campbell, 21. Paddy Wallace, 22. Jonny Bell (for Maxwell). | | | | Attendance: 9,617; Referee: Andy Ireland |

| 12 May 2006 | Ulster (Ireland) | 63–17 | (Scotland) Border Reivers | Ravenhill, Belfast |
| 19:30 | Try: Bowe (2); Wallace; Maxwell (2); Wilson; Trimble (2); Ferris; Con: Humphreys (6); Pen: Humphreys (2); Cards: Harrison (yellow card) | Report | Try: Moffat; Danielli; Con: MacRae (2); Pen: MacRae | Attendance: 8,932; Referee: James Jones |
| Ulster lineup: 1. Bryan Young, 2. Rory Best, 3. Simon Best, 4. Justin Harrison, 5. Matt McCullough, 6. Neil Best, 7. Stephen Ferris, 8. Roger Wilson, 9. Isaac Boss, 10. David Humphreys, 11. Andy Maxwell, 12. Andrew Trimble, 13. Jonny Bell, 14. Tommy Bowe, 15. Bryn Cunningham.; Replacements: 16. Paul Shields (for R. Best), 17. Justin Fitzpatrick (for Young), 18. Ryan Caldwell (for McCullough), 19. Neil McMillan (for Ferris), 20. Kieran Campbell (for Boss), 21. Paddy Wallace (for Cunningham), 22. Tyrone Howe (for Bell). | | | | Attendance: 8,932; Referee: James Jones |

| 19 May 2006 | Llanelli Scarlets (Wales) | 12–12 | (Ireland) Ulster | Stradey Park, Llanelli |
| 19:10 | Try: John (2); Con: Evans | Report | Try: Bowe; Maxwell; Con: Humphreys | Attendance: 6,425; Referee: Graeme Hannah |
| Ulster lineup: 1. Bryan Young, 2. Rory Best, 3. Simon Best, 4. Justin Harrison, 5. Matt McCullough, 6. Neil Best, 7. Stephen Ferris, 8. Roger Wilson, 9. Isaac Boss, 10. David Humphreys, 11. Andy Maxwell, 12. Paddy Wallace, 13. Andrew Trimble, 14. Tommy Bowe, 15. Bryn Cunningham.; Replacements: 16. Nigel Brady, 17. Justin Fitzpatrick (for S. Best), 18. Ryan Caldwell, 19. Neil McMillan (for Ferris), 20. Kieran Campbell, 21. Jonny Bell (for Humphreys), 22. Tyrone Howe. | | | | Attendance: 6,425; Referee: Graeme Hannah |

| 26 May 2006 | Ospreys (Wales) | 17–19 | (Ireland) Ulster | Liberty Stadium, Swansea |
| 19:10 | Try: Spice; Vaughton; Con: Henson (2); Pen: Henson; Cards: Thomas (yellow card) | Report | Try: McCullough; Con: Humphreys; Pen: Humphreys (2); Drop: Humphreys | Attendance: 10,316; Referee: David Changleng |
| Ulster lineup: 1. Justin Fitzpatrick, 2. Rory Best, 3. Bryan Young, 4. Justin Harrison, 5. Matt McCullough, 6. Neil Best, 7. Stephen Ferris, 8. Roger Wilson, 9. Isaac Boss, 10. David Humphreys, 11. Andy Maxwell, 12. Paddy Wallace, 13. Andrew Trimble, 14. Tommy Bowe, 15. Bryn Cunningham.; Replacements: 16. Nigel Brady, 17. Rod Moore, 18. Ryan Caldwell, 19. Neil McMillan (for Ferris), 20. Kieran Campbell (for Boss), 21. Jonny Bell, 22. James Topping. | | | | Attendance: 10,316; Referee: David Changleng |

== Home attendance ==
| Domestic League | | | | | European Cup | | | | | Total | |
| League | Fixtures | Average Attendance | Highest | Lowest | League | Fixtures | Average Attendance | Highest | Lowest | Total Attendance | Average Attendance |
| 2005–06 Celtic League | 10 | 9,181 | 12,300 | 6,487 | 2005–06 Heineken Cup | 3 | 12,284 | 12,300 | 12,252 | 128,665 | 9,897 |

== Friendlies ==
| 19 August 2005 | Ulster (Ireland) | 9-17 | (England) London Irish | Ravenhill, Belfast |
| | Pen: Steinmetz (3) | Report | Try: Ojo (2); Staniforth; Con: Laidlaw | Attendance: 6,330; Referee: C Stanley |
| Ulster lineup: 1. Bryan Young, 2. Paul Shields, 3. Simon Best, 4. Justin Harrison, 5. Matt McCullough, 6. Campbell Feather, 7. Neil Best, 8. Roger Wilson, 9. Kieran Campbell, 10. Paddy Wallace, 11. Tyrone Howe, 12. Paul Steinmetz, 13. Andrew Trimble, 14. James Topping, 15. Bryn Cunningham.; Replacements: Reece Spee (for Campbell 40'), Rowan Frost (for McCullough 40'), Neil McMillan (for Wilson 47'), Tommy Bowe (for Howe 48'), Adam Larkin (for Wallace 58'), Henry Head (for Harrison 70'), Jonny Bell (for Topping 77'). | | | | Attendance: 6,330; Referee: C Stanley |

| 26 August 2005 | Ulster (Ireland) | 42-15 | (England) Rotherham Titans | Ravenhill, Belfast |
| | Try: N. Best; McMillan (2); Trimble; Humphreys; Frost; Con: Steinmetz (2); Humphreys (3); Wallace | Report | Try: Fourie; McGowan; Con: Whitehead; Pen: Whitehead |
Ulster lineup: 1. Bryan Young, 2. Rory Best, 3. Declan Fitzpatrick, 4. Justin Harrison, 5. Ryan Caldwell, 6. Neil Best, 7. Campbell Feather (c), 8. Neil McMillan, 9. Reece Spee, 10. Paddy Wallace, 11. Scott Young, 12. Paul Steinmetz, 13. Jonny Bell, 14. James Topping, 15. Bryn Cunningham.; Replacements: Nigel Brady, Justin Fitzpatrick, Rowan Frost, Henry Head, Chris Henry, Oisin Hennessey, Paul Marshall, David Humphreys, Kevin Maggs, Shane Stewart, Andrew Trimble.

== Ulster Rugby Awards ==
The Ulster Rugby Awards ceremony was held at the Ramada Hotel on 18 May 2006. Winners were:

- Bank of Ireland Ulster Player of the Year: Andrew Trimble
- Guinness Ulster Rugby Personality of the Year: Justin Harrison
- UTV Young Player of the Year: Stephen Ferris
- Northern Bank Schools Player of the Year: Stephen Douglas, RBAI
- Kukri Sportswear Club of the Year: Rainey Old Boys
- Calor Gas Youth Player of the Year: William Stewart, Ballyclare
- Dorrington B. Faulkner Award: Ian Beggs, Carrickfergus
- First Trust Club Player of the Year: Glenn Moore, QUB
