= 2004–05 Ulster Rugby season =

- Ground: Ravenhill Stadium (Capacity: 12,500)
- Coach: Mark McCall
- Captain: Andy Ward
- Top scorer: David Humphreys (145)
- Most tries: Tommy Bowe (9)
- League(s): Heineken Cup (3rd in pool); Celtic League (8th); Celtic Cup (quarter-finalists)

The 2004–05 season was Ulster Rugby's tenth under professionalism, and their first under head coach Mark McCall. They competed in the Heineken Cup, the Celtic League and the Celtic Cup.

Former head coach Alan Solomons and forwards coach Adrian Kennedy left at the end of the previous season to join Northampton Saints. Backs coach Mark McCall was named as the new head coach, with Allen Clarke as his assistant. Maurice Field replaced Clarke as head of the academy.

In the Celtic League, they finished eighth. Tommy Bowe was the league's second top try scorer with eight. In the Heineken Cup, they finished third in Pool 6, failing to qualify for the knockout stage. They went out of the Celtic Cup in the quarter-finals, losing to Neath-Swansea Ospreys. Neil Best was Ulster's Player of the Year. Kieran Campbell won the IRUPA award for Try of the Year.

== Squad ==
=== Senior squad ===
==== Players in ====
- (Ireland) Rory Best from (Ireland) Belfast Harlequins
- (Ireland) Gary Brown from (Ireland) Belfast Harlequins
- (New Zealand) Campbell Feather from (Scotland) Border Reivers
- (Ireland) Declan Fitzpatrick from (Ireland) Belfast Harlequins
- (England) Andrew Kershaw from (England) Saracens
- (Ireland) Kevin Maggs from (England) Bath
- (South Africa) Gavin Pfister from (England) Pertemps Bees

==== Players out ====
- (Ireland) Clem Boyd (retired)
- (South Africa) Warren Brosnihan (released)
- (Australia) Ryan Constable (retired)
- (South Africa) Robbi Kempson to (England) Northampton
- (England) Andrew Kershaw to (England) Leeds Tykes
- (Ireland) Tony McWhirter (retired)
- (New Zealand) Matt Sexton (retired)

Ulster Rugby squad
**Props**: (Australia) **Rod Moore** (24 apps, 21 starts); (Ireland) **Simon Best** (20 apps, 19 starts, 5 pts); (Ireland) Ronan McCormack (23 apps, 14 starts, 5 pts); (Ireland) Bryan Young (4 apps); (Ireland) Declan Fitzpatrick; (England) Andrew Kershaw; (Ireland) Simon Shawe; **Hookers**: (Ireland) **Paul Shields** (23 apps, 19 starts); (Ireland) Nigel Brady (10 apps, 3 starts); (Ireland) Rory Best (9 apps, 5 starts); **Locks**: (Ireland) Matt McCullough (26 apps, 25 starts, 5 pts); (Ireland) **Gary Longwell** (21 apps, 19 starts); (New Zealand) Rowan Frost* (23 apps, 9 starts, 5 pts); (New Zealand) Matt Mustchin (7 apps, 4 starts); (Ireland) Tim Barker (2 apps)	**Back row**: (Ireland) Neil Best (22 apps, 22 starts, 5 pts); (Ireland) Roger Wilson (22 apps, 20 starts, 5 pts); (New Zealand) Campbell Feather (26 apps, 17 starts, 15 pts); (Ireland) **Andy Ward** (c) (17 apps, 13 starts, 5 pts); (South Africa) Gavin Pfister (6 apps, 4 starts); (Ireland) Gary Brown (4 apps, 1 starts); (Ireland) Neil McMillan (1 apps, 1 starts); **Scrum-halves**: (Ireland) Kieran Campbell (24 apps, 21 starts, 5pts); (Ireland) Neil Doak (14 apps, 6 starts); (New Zealand) Reece Spee* (1 app); **Fly-halves**: (Ireland) **David Humphreys** (16 apps, 16 starts, 145 pts); (Ireland) Paddy Wallace (12 apps, 6 starts, 24 pts); (Australia) Adam Larkin (9 apps, 6 starts, 54 pts)	**Centres**: (New Zealand) Paul Steinmetz (26 apps, 24 starts, 45 pts); (Ireland) Kevin Maggs (21 apps, 21 starts, 15 pts); (Ireland) **Jonny Bell** (13 apps, 11 starts, 5 pts); (Ireland) Seamus Mallon (3 apps, 1 starts); (New Zealand) Shane Stewart; **Wings**: (Ireland) Tommy Bowe (26 apps, 25 starts, 40 pts); (Ireland) **Tyrone Howe** (17 apps, 15 starts, 15 pts); (Ireland) Andy Maxwell (14 apps, 9 starts, 15 pts); (Ireland) Scott Young (9 apps, 6 starts); (Ireland) **James Topping**; **Fullbacks**: (Ireland) Bryn Cunningham (26 apps, 25 starts, 25 pts)
(c) denotes the team captain, **Bold** denotes internationally capped players.^{*} denotes players qualified to play for Ireland on residency or dual nationality.

=== Academy squad ===
Academy squad
**Staff**: Joe Miles - chairman; Allen Clarke - director; Maurice Field - manager; Roger Kennedy - strength and conditioning; Michael Webb - doctor; Phil Glasgow - physiotheraprist	**Players**: Glenn Telford; Gareth Steenson; Gary Maxwell; Niall Conlon; John Andress; Lewis Stevenson; Chris Henry; Oisin Hennessy; Stephen Ferris; Stuart McGaw; Thomas Horner; Glen Moore; Mark Scott; Jamie McGrugan; Blair Clements; Paul McKenzie

== Season record ==
Competition	Played	Won	Drawn	Lost	PF	PA	PD	TF	TA
2004-05 Heineken Cup	6	3	0	3	88	139	-51	5	13
2004-05 Celtic League	20	9	0	11	363	387	-24	37	34
2004-05 Celtic Cup	1	0	0	1	16	23	-7	1	2
Total	27	12	0	15	467	549	-82	43	49

== 2004–05 Heineken Cup ==
=== Pool 6 ===
Team	P	W	D	L	Tries for	Tries against	Try diff	Points for	Points against	Points diff	TB	LB	Pts
(France) Stade Français (3)	6	5	0	1	20	9	11	179	90	89	3	0	23
(England) Gloucester	6	3	0	3	14	12	2	144	128	16	1	1	14
(Ireland) Ulster	6	3	0	3	5	13	−8	88	139	−51	0	1	13
(Wales) Cardiff Blues	6	1	0	5	8	13	−5	98	152	−54	0	3	7

22 October 2004	Ulster (Ireland)	21 – 16	(Wales) Cardiff Blues	Ravenhill, Belfast
19:30	Pen: Humphreys (5); Drop: Humphreys (2)	Report; Match centre	Try: Shanklin; Con: Thomas; Pen: Thomas (2); Drop: Thomas	Attendance: 9,600; Referee: Joël Jutge
Ulster lineup: 1. Ronan McCormack, 2. Nigel Brady, 3. Simon Best, 4. Gary Longwell, 5. Matt McCullough, 6. Andy Ward (c), 7. Neil McMillan, 8. Campbell Feather, 9. Kieran Campbell, 10. David Humphreys, 11. Tyrone Howe, 12. Paul Steinmetz, 13. Kevin Maggs, 14. Tommy Bowe, 15. Bryn Cunningham.; Replacements: 16. Paul Shields, 17. Rod Moore (for McCormack), 18. Rowan Frost (for Longwell), 19. Roger Wilson (for Feather), 20. Neil Doak (for Campbell), 21. Paddy Wallace, 22. Jonny Bell.				Attendance: 9,600; Referee: Joël Jutge

30 October 2004	Gloucester (England)	55 – 13	(Ireland) Ulster	Kingsholm Stadium, Gloucester
15:00	Try: MacRae; GoodridgeBezuidenhout; Simpson-Daniel; Garvey; Balding; Con: Paul (5); Pen: Paul (4); Drop: Paul	Report; Match centre	Try: Humphreys; Con: Humphreys (1); Pen: Humphreys (2)	Attendance: 12,467; Referee: Eric Darriere
Ulster lineup: 1. Simon Best, 2. Nigel Brady, 3. Rod Moore, 4. Gary Longwell, 5. Matt McCullough, 6. Andy Ward (c), 7. Neil Best, 8. Roger Wilson, 9. Neil Doak, 10. David Humphreys, 11. Tyrone Howe, 12. Paul Steinmetz, 13. Kevin Maggs, 14. Tommy Bowe, 15. Bryn Cunningham.; Replacements: 16. Paul Shields (for Brady), 17. Ronan McCormack (for Moore), 18. Rowan Frost (for Longwell), 19. Campbell Feather (for Ward), 20. Kieran Campbell (for Doak), 21. Paddy Wallace (for Humphreys), 22. Adam Larkin.				Attendance: 12,467; Referee: Eric Darriere

4 December 2004	Stade Français (France)	30 – 10	(Ireland) Ulster	Stade Jean-Bouin, Paris
14:00	Try: Blin; Sowerby; Bergamasco; Con: Skrela (3); Pen: Skrela (3)	Report; Match centre	Try: Bowe; Con: Humphreys; Pen: Humphreys	Attendance: 11,628
Ulster lineup: 1. Ronan McCormack, 2. Paul Shields, 3. Rod Moore, 4. Rowan Frost, 5. Matt McCullough, 6. Campbell Feather, 7. Neil Best, 8. Roger Wilson, 9. Kieran Campbell, 10. David Humphreys, 11. Tommy Bowe, 12. Kevin Maggs, 13. Jonny Bell, 14. Scott Young, 15. Bryn Cunningham.; Replacements: 16. Nigel Brady (for Shields 68), 17. Bryan Young, 18. Gary Longwell (for Frost 40), 19. Tim Barker, 20. Neil Doak (for Campbell 75), 21. Adam Larkin, 22. Paul Steinmetz (for Bell 67).				Attendance: 11,628

11 December 2004	Ulster (Ireland)	18 – 10	(France) Stade Français	Ravenhill, Belfast
13:00	Try: Campbell; Humphreys; Con: Humphreys; Pen: Humphreys; Drop: Humphreys	Report; Match centre	Try: Hernández; Con: Skrela; Drop: Skrela	Attendance: 7,320; Referee: Nigel Williams
Ulster lineup: 1. Ronan McCormack, 2. Paul Shields, 3. Rod Moore, 4. Gary Longwell, 5. Matt McCullough, 6. Campbell Feather (c), 7. Neil Best, 8. Roger Wilson, 9. Kieran Campbell, 10. David Humphreys, 11. Tommy Bowe, 12. Kevin Maggs, 13. Jonny Bell, 14. Scott Young, 15. Bryn Cunningham.; Replacements: 16. Nigel Brady, 17. Bryan Young (for McCormack 80), 18. Rowan Frost (for Longwell 80), 19. Matt Mustchin, 20. Neil Doak, 21. Adam Larkin, 22. Paul Steinmetz (for S. Young 27).				Attendance: 7,320; Referee: Nigel Williams

7 January 2005	Ulster (Ireland)	14 – 12	(England) Gloucester	Ravenhill, Belfast
19:30	Try: Cunningham; Pen: Humphreys (3)	Report; Match centre	Pen: Paul (3); Drop: Amor	Attendance: 11,435; Referee: Nigel Whitehouse
Ulster lineup: 1. Simon Best, 2. Rory Best, 3. Rod Moore, 4. Gary Longwell, 5. Matt McCullough, 6. Campbell Feather (c), 7. Neil Best, 8. Roger Wilson, 9. Kieran Campbell, 10. David Humphreys, 11. Tyrone Howe, 12. Kevin Maggs, 13. Paul Steinmetz, 14. Tommy Bowe, 15. Bryn Cunningham.; Replacements: 16. Paul Shields (for R. Best 57), 17. Neil McCormack, 18. Rowan Frost (for Longwell 66), 19. Andy Ward (for Feather 62), 20. Neil Doak, 21. Adam Larkin, 22. Paddy Wallace (for Howe 70).				Attendance: 11,435; Referee: Nigel Whitehouse

16 January 2005	Cardiff Blues (Wales)	16 – 12	(Ireland) Ulster	{{{stadium}}}
17:15	Try: Vaughton 48'; Thomas 71'; Pen: Macleod (2) 4', 22'; Cards: Yapp (yellow card) 11'	Report; Match centre	Pen: Humphreys (2) 6', 42'; Larkin (2) 57', 78'; Cards: S. Best (yellow card) 11'; Frost (yellow card) 64' stadium = Cardiff Arms Park	Attendance: 3,962
Ulster lineup: 1. Ronan McCormick, 2. Paul Shields, 3. Simon Best, 4. Rowan Frost, 5. Matt McCullough, 6. Andy Ward (c), 7. Neil Best, 8. Roger Wilson, 9. Kieran Campbell, 10. David Humphreys, 11. Andy Maxwell, 12. Kevin Maggs, 13. Paul Steinmetz, 14. Tommy Bowe, 15. Paddy Wallace.; Replacements: 16. Rory Best (for Shields 56), 17. Rod Moore (for Ward 14-23), 18. Matt Mustchin (for Frost 74), 19. Campbell Feather (for Ward 55), 20. Reece Spee (for Campbell 76), 21. Adam Larkin (for Humphreys 50), 22. Bryn Cunningham (for Wallace 65).				Attendance: 3,962

== 2004-05 Celtic League ==
	Team	Pld	W	D	L	PF	PA	PD	TF	TA	Try bonus	Losing bonus	Pts
1	(Wales) Neath-Swansea Ospreys	20	16	1	3	508	267	+241	53	27	7	3	76
2	(Ireland) Munster	20	15	1	4	470	331	+139	54	33	6	1	69
3	(Ireland) Leinster	20	12	1	7	455	350	+105	46	32	4	3	57
4	(Wales) Newport Gwent Dragons	20	11	0	9	381	436	−55	39	43	4	2	50
5	(Wales) Llanelli Scarlets	20	9	0	11	402	446	−44	48	42	7	3	46
6	(Scotland) Glasgow Warriors	20	8	1	11	465	466	−1	40	58	4	7	45
7	(Scotland) Edinburgh	20	9	0	11	409	407	+2	47	40	4	4	44
8	(Ireland) Ulster	20	9	0	11	363	387	−24	37	34	2	5	43
9	(Wales) Cardiff Blues	20	8	1	11	350	404	−54	35	41	2	4	40
10	(Ireland) Connacht	20	7	1	12	317	407	−90	32	46	2	5	37
11	(Scotland) Borders	20	3	0	17	337	556	−219	31	66	2	4	18
Under the standard bonus point system, points are awarded as follows: 4 points for a win; 2 points for a draw; 1 bonus point for scoring 4 tries (or more) (Try bonus); 1 bonus point for losing by 7 points (or fewer) (Losing bonus)
Source: RaboDirect PRO12

4 September 2004	Edinburgh (Scotland)	16–17	(Ireland) Ulster	Murrayfield, Edinburgh
14:30	Try: Blackadder; Con: Paterson; Pen: Paterson (3)	Report	Try: Maxwell; Pen: Wallace (2); Drop: Steinmetz; Wallace; Cards: Best (yellow card)	Attendance: 2,609
Ulster lineup: 1. Ronan McCormack, 2. Paul Shields, 3. Rod Moore, 4. Matt Mustchin, 5. Rowan Frost, 6. Andy Ward (c), 7. Neil Best, 8. Campbell Feather, 9. Neil Doak, 10. Paddy Wallace, 11. Andy Maxwell, 12. Paul Steinmetz, 13. Jonny Bell, 14. Tommy Bowe, 15. Bryn Cunningham.; Replacements: 16. Nigel Brady (for Shields), 17. Bryan Young (for McCormack), 18. Gary Longwell (for Frost), 19. Gary Brown (for Feather), 20. Kieran Campbell, 21. Seamus Mallon, 22. Scott Young (for Maxwell).				Attendance: 2,609

11 September 2004	Ulster (Ireland)	15–26	(Ireland) Leinster	Ravenhill, Belfast
17:15	Try: Cunningham; Maxwell; Con: Wallace; Pen: Wallace	Report	Try: Warner; Gissing; O'Riordan; Con: O'Meara; Pen: O'Meara; McAllister (2); Cards: Dillon (yellow card)	Attendance: 6,100; Referee: Nigel Williams
Ulster lineup: 1. Simon Best, 2. Paul Shields, 3. Rod Moore, 4. Matt Mustchin, 5. Rowan Frost, 6. Andy Ward (c), 7. Neil Best, 8. Roger Wilson, 9. Neil Doak, 10. Paddy Wallace, 11. Andy Maxwell, 12. Paul Steinmetz, 13. Jonny Bell, 14. Tommy Bowe, 15. Bryn Cunningham.; Replacements: 16. Nigel Brady, 17. Ronan McCormack (for Moore), 18. Matt McCullough (for Frost), 19. Campbell Feather (for Wilson), 20. Kieran Campbell, 21. Seamus Mallon (for Bell), 22. Scott Young (for Cunningham).				Attendance: 6,100; Referee: Nigel Williams

18 September 2004	Connacht (Ireland)	13–19	(Ireland) Ulster	The Sportsground, Galway
14:30	Try: O'Loughlin; Con: Warwick; Pen: Warwick (2); Cards: Mostyn (yellow card); Muldoon (yellow card)	Report	Try: Bowe; Bell; Pen: Humphreys (3)	Attendance: 1,300
Ulster lineup: 1. Simon Best, 2. Paul Shields, 3. Rod Moore, 4. Matt Mustchin, 5. Matt McCullough, 6. Andy Ward (c), 7. Neil Best, 8. Roger Wilson, 9. Neil Doak, 10. David Humphreys, 11. Andy Maxwell, 12. Kevin Maggs, 13. Jonny Bell, 14. Tommy Bowe, 15. Bryn Cunningham.; Replacements: 16. Nigel Brady, 17. Ronan McCormack (for S. Best), 18. Rowan Frost (for Mustchin), 19. Campbell Feather (for N. Best), 20. Kieran Campbell, 21. Paddy Wallace, 22. Paul Steinmetz.				Attendance: 1,300

25 September 2004	Ulster (Ireland)	24–37	(Wales) Neath-Swansea Ospreys	Ravenhill, Belfast
17:15	Try: Maggs; Cunningham; Feather; Con: Humphreys (3); Pen: Humphreys; Cards: N. Best (yellow card)	Report	Try: Williams; Tiueti; Parker; Bishop; Con: Henson (4); Pen: Henson (2); Drop: Henson	Attendance: 5,638
Ulster lineup: 1. Simon Best, 2. Paul Shields, 3. Rod Moore, 4. Matt Mustchin, 5. Matt McCullough, 6. Andy Ward (c), 7. Neil Best, 8. Roger Wilson, 9. Neil Doak, 10. David Humphreys, 11. Andy Maxwell, 12. Kevin Maggs, 13. Jonny Bell, 14. Tommy Bowe, 15. Bryn Cunningham.; Replacements: 16. Nigel Brady (for Shields), 17. Ronan McCormack, 18. Rowan Frost (for Mustchin), 19. Campbell Feather (for Ward), 20. Kieran Campbell (for Doak), 21. Paddy Wallace (for Cunningham), 22. Tyrone Howe (for Maxwell).				Attendance: 5,638

8 October 2004	Ulster (Ireland)	21–28	(Wales) Newport Gwent Dragons	Ravenhill, Belfast
19:05	Try: McCormack; N. Best; Con: Humphreys; Pen: Humphreys (3)	Report	Try: Morgan; Black; Brew; Con: Sweeney (2); Pen: Sweeney (3)	Attendance: 8,145
Ulster lineup: 1. Simon Best, 2. Paul Shields, 3. Rod Moore, 4. Gary Longwell, 5. Matt McCullough, 6. Campbell Feather, 7. Neil Best, 8. Roger Wilson, 9. Kieran Campbell, 10. David Humphreys, 11. Tyrone Howe, 12. Paul Steinmetz, 13. Kevin Maggs, 14. Tommy Bowe, 15. Bryn Cunningham.; Replacements: 16. Nigel Brady (for Shields), 17. Ronan McCormack (for Moore), 18. Rowan Frost, 19. Matt Mustchin (for Wilson), 20. Neil Doak (for Campbell), 21. Paddy Wallace, 22. Jonny Bell (for Steinmetz).				Attendance: 8,145

16 October 2004	Glasgow Warriors (Scotland)	34–20	(Ireland) Ulster	Hughenden, Glasgow
19:15	Try: Tkachuk; Parks (2); Morrison; Con: Parks (4); Pen: Parks (2); Cards: Petrie (yellow card)	Report	Try: Bowe; Howe; Con: Humphreys (2); Pen: Humphreys (2); Cards: S. Best (yellow card); McCullough (yellow card)	Attendance: 3,469
Ulster lineup: 1. Ronan McCormack, 2. Nigel Brady, 3. Simon Best, 4. Gary Longwell, 5. Matt McCullough, 6. Campbell Feather, 7. Neil Best, 8. Gary Brown, 9. Kieran Campbell, 10. David Humphreys, 11. Tyrone Howe, 12. Paul Steinmetz, 13. Kevin Maggs, 14. Tommy Bowe, 15. Bryn Cunningham.; Replacements: 16. Paul Shields (for Brady), 17. Rod Moore (for S. Best), 18. Rowan Frost (for Longwell), 19. Matt Mustchin (for Brown), 20. Neil Doak (for Campbell), 21. Paddy Wallace (for Cunningham), 22. Jonny Bell (for Steinmetz).				Attendance: 3,469

6 November 2004	Ulster (Ireland)	3–24	(Ireland) Munster	Ravenhill, Belfast
17:15	Pen: Larkin	Report	Try: Payne; Lawler; Con: Burke; Pen: Burke (4)	Attendance: 6,402
Ulster lineup: 1. Simon Best, 2. Paul Shields, 3. Rod Moore, 4. Rowan Frost, 5. Matt McCullough, 6. Andy Ward, 7. Neil Best, 8. Campbell Feather, 9. Neil Doak, 10. Adam Larkin, 11. Tyrone Howe, 12. Paul Steinmetz, 13. Jonny Bell, 14. Tommy Bowe, 15. Bryn Cunningham.; Replacements: 16. Rory Best (for Shields), 17. Ronan McCormick (for Moore), 18. Gary Longwell, 19. Gary Brown (for Feather), 20. Kieran Campbell (for Doak), 21. Seamus Mallon (for Bell), 22. Andy Maxwell (for Howe).				Attendance: 6,402

12 November 2004	Borders (Scotland)	19–20	(Ireland) Ulster	Netherdale, Galashiels
19:30	Try: Weston; Con: Warnock; Pen: Warnock (3); Hore; Cards: Blair (yellow card); Brown (yellow card)	Report	Try: Cunningham; Steinmetz; Con: Larkin (2); Pen: Larkin (2)	Attendance: 1,500
Ulster lineup: 1. Simon Best, 2. Paul Shields, 3. Rod Moore, 4. Rowan Frost, 5. Matt McCullough, 6. Andy Ward, 7. Neil Best, 8. Campbell Feather, 9. Kieran Campbell, 10. Adam Larkin, 11. Tyrone Howe, 12. Paul Steinmetz, 13. Jonny Bell, 14. Andy Maxwell, 15. Bryn Cunningham.; Replacements: 16. Nigel Brady, 17. Ronan McCormick, 18. Gary Longwell, 19. Gary Brown (for Ward), 20. Neil Doak, 21. Scott Young, 22. Tommy Bowe (for Howe).				Attendance: 1,500

19 November 2004	Ulster (Ireland)	30–14	(Wales) Cardiff Blues	Ravenhill, Belfast
19:30	Try: Feather; McCullough; Maxwell; Pen: Larkin (5)	Report	Try: Thomas; Pen: Thomas (3); Cards: Jones (yellow card)	Attendance: 5,705
Ulster lineup: 1. Ronan McCormack, 2. Paul Shields, 3. Rod Moore, 4. Gary Longwell, 5. Rowan Frost, 6. Matt McCullough, 7. Neil Best, 8. Campbell Feather, 9. Kieran Campbell, 10. Adam Larkin, 11. Andy Maxwell, 12. Paul Steinmetz, 13. Jonny Bell, 14. Scott Young, 15. Bryn Cunningham.; Replacements: 16. Nigel Brady, 17. Bryan Young, 18. Gary Brown, 19. Gavin Pfister (for N. Best), 20. Neil Doak, 21. Seamus Mallon, 22. Andrew Trimble.				Attendance: 5,705

28 November 2004	Llanelli Scarlets (Wales)	22–9	(Ireland) Ulster	Stradey Park, Llanelli
18:00	Try: John; Con: Bowen; Pen: Bowen (5); Cards: Wyatt (yellow card)	Report	Pen: Larkin (3); Cards: N. Best (yellow card)	Attendance: 5,334
Ulster lineup: 1. Ronan McCormack, 2. Paul Shields, 3. Rod Moore, 4. Gary Longwell, 5. Rowan Frost, 6. Matt McCullough, 7. Neil Best, 8. Campbell Feather, 9. Kieran Campbell, 10. Adam Larkin, 11. Andy Maxwell, 12. Paul Steinmetz, 13. Jonny Bell, 14. Tommy Bowe, 15. Bryn Cunningham.; Replacements: 16. Nigel Brady (for Shields), 17. Bryan Young (for McCormack), 18. Roger Wilson (for Longwell), 19. Gavin Pfister, 20. Neil Doak (for Campbell), 21. Scott Young (for Bell), 22. Tyrone Howe (for Maxwell).				Attendance: 5,334

17 December 2004	Ulster (Ireland)	36–34	(Scotland) Edinburgh	Ravenhill, Belfast
19:30	Try: Maggs; Bowe; Steinmetz; Frost; Con: Steinmetz (2); Pen: Humphreys (3); Steinmetz	Report	Try: Lee; Hogg; Callam; Boston; Con: Laney (4); Pen: Laney (2)	Attendance: 5,858
Ulster lineup: 1. Ronan McCormack, 2. Paul Shields, 3. Rod Moore, 4. Gary Longwell, 5. Matt McCullough, 6. Campbell Feather, 7. Gavin Pfister, 8. Roger Wilson, 9. Kieran Campbell, 10. David Humphreys, 11. Tyrone Howe, 12. Paul Steinmetz, 13. Kevin Maggs, 14. Tommy Bowe, 15. Bryn Cunningham.; Replacements: 16. Rory Best (for Shields), 17. Simon Best (for Moore), 18. Rowan Frost (for Pfister), 19. Matt Mustchin, 20. Neil Doak, 21. Adam Larkin, 22. Andy Maxwell.				Attendance: 5,858

27 December 2004	Leinster (Ireland)	9–8	(Ireland) Ulster	Donnybrook, Dublin
17:05	Pen: Contepomi (3); Cards: O'Driscoll (yellow card)	Report	Try: Howe; Pen: Larkin; Cards: Howe (yellow card); Frost (yellow card)	Attendance: 5,500; Referee: Alain Rolland
Ulster lineup: 1. Simon Best, 2. Rory Best, 3. Rod Moore, 4. Gary Longwell, 5. Matt McCullough, 6. Campbell Feather, 7. Neil Best, 8. Roger Wilson, 9. Kieran Campbell, 10. Adam Larkin, 11. Tyrone Howe, 12. Paul Steinmetz, 13. Kevin Maggs, 14. Tommy Bowe, 15. Bryn Cunningham.; Replacements: 16. Nigel Brady (for R. Best), 17. Ronan McCormack (for S. Best), 18. Rowan Frost (for N. Best), 19. Matt Mustchin, 20. Neil Doak, 21. Paddy Wallace, 22. Jonny Bell.				Attendance: 5,500; Referee: Alain Rolland

1 January 2005	Ulster (Ireland)	23–14	(Ireland) Connacht	Ravenhill, Belfast
16:00	Try: Bowe; Steinmetz; Con: Humphreys (2); Pen: Humphreys (3)	Report	Try: Jackman; Pen: Warwick; Cards: O'Sullivan (yellow card)	Attendance: 7,900; Referee: David Keane
Ulster lineup: 1. Ronan McCormick, 2. Rory Best, 3. Rod Moore, 4. Gary Longwell, 5. Matt McCullough, 6. Campbell Feather, 7. Neil Best, 8. Roger Wilson, 9. Kieran Campbell, 10. David Humphreys, 11. Tyrone Howe, 12. Paul Steinmetz, 13. Kevin Maggs, 14. Tommy Bowe, 15. Bryn Cunningham.; Replacements: 16. Paul Shields, 17. Simon Shawe, 18. Rowan Frost (for Longwell), 19. Andy Ward (for Feather), 20. Neil Doak (for Campbell), 21. Adam Larkin, 22. Jonny Bell.				Attendance: 7,900; Referee: David Keane

21 January 2005	Neath-Swansea Ospreys (Wales)	22–21	(Ireland) Ulster	St Helen's, Swansea
19:05	Try: Henson; Con: Henson; Pen: Henson (5)	Report	Try: Bowe; Maxwell; Con: Humphreys; Pen: Humphreys (3)	Attendance: 4,142
Ulster lineup: 1. Ronan McCormick, 2. Rory Best, 3. Simon Best, 4. Gary Longwell, 5. Matt McCullough, 6. Campbell Feather, 7. Neil Best, 8. Roger Wilson, 9. Kieran Campbell, 10. David Humphreys, 11. Andy Maxwell, 12. Paul Steinmetz, 13. Kevin Maggs, 14. Tommy Bowe, 15. Bryn Cunningham.; Replacements: 16. Paul Shields, 17. Simon Shawe, 18. Rowan Frost (for Longwell), 19. Andy Ward (for Feather), 20. Reece Spee, 21. Adam Larkin, 22. Shane Stewart.				Attendance: 4,142

18 February 2005	Newport Gwent Dragons (Wales)	13–11	(Ireland) Ulster	Rodney Parade, Newport
19:05	Try: Forster; Con: Warlow; Pen: Montgomery	Report	Try: Cunningham; Pen: Humphreys; Drop: Humphreys; Cards: McCullough (yellow card)	Attendance: 4,452; Referee: Andy Ireland
Ulster lineup: 1. Simon Best, 2. Rory Best, 3. Rod Moore, 4. Gary Longwell, 5. Matt McCullough, 6. Campbell Feather, 7. Neil Best, 8. Roger Wilson, 9. Kieran Campbell, 10. David Humphreys, 11. Tyrone Howe, 12. Paul Steinmetz, 13. Kevin Maggs, 14. Tommy Bowe, 15. Bryn Cunningham.; Replacements: 16. Paul Shields (for R. Best), 17. Ronan McCormick (for Moore), 18. Rowan Frost (for Longwell), 19. Gavin Pfister (for Feather), 20. Reece Spee, 21. Adam Larkin, 22. Scott Young.				Attendance: 4,452; Referee: Andy Ireland

4 March 2005	Ulster (Ireland)	30–3	(Scotland) Glasgow Warriors	Ravenhill, Belfast
19:30	Try: Maggs; Bowe; Howe; S. Best; Con: Larkin; Wallace; Pen: Larkin (2)	Report	Cards: Prescott (yellow card)	Attendance: 6,215; Referee: Nigel Owens
Ulster lineup: 1. Ronan McCormack, 2. Paul Shields, 3. Simon Best, 4. Gary Longwell, 5. Matt McCullough, 6. Campbell Feather, 7. Neil Best, 8. Roger Wilson, 9. Kieran Campbell, 10. Adam Larkin, 11. Tyrone Howe, 12. Paul Steinmetz, 13. Kevin Maggs, 14. Tommy Bowe, 15. Bryn Cunningham.; Replacements: 16. Rory Best, 17. Rod Moore, 18. Tim Barker (for Longwell), 19. Andy Ward (for Feather), 20. Neil Doak, 21. Paddy Wallace (for Larkin), 22. Scott Young.				Attendance: 6,215; Referee: Nigel Owens

18 March 2005	Munster (Ireland)	21–15	(Ireland) Ulster	Musgrave Park, Cork
19:00	Try: D. Wallace; Kelly; Con: Burke; Pen: Burke (3)	Report	Try: Bowe; Wilson; Con: P. Wallace; Drop: P. Wallace; Cards: Longwell (yellow card)	Attendance: 5,870; Referee: Andy Ireland
Ulster lineup: 1. Ronan McCormack, 2. Paul Shields, 3. Rod Moore, 4. Gary Longwell, 5. Matt McCullough, 6. Andy Ward, 7. Neil Best, 8. Roger Wilson, 9. Kieran Campbell, 10. Paddy Wallace, 11. Tyrone Howe, 12. Paul Steinmetz, 13. Seamus Mallon, 14. Scott Young, 15. Tommy Bowe.; Replacements: 16. Nigel Brady (for Shields), 17. Bryan Young (for Moore), 18. Tim Barker, 19. Campbell Feather (for Ward), 20. Neil Doak, 21. Adam Larkin, 22. Shane Stewart.				Attendance: 5,870; Referee: Andy Ireland

25 March 2005	Ulster (Ireland)	17–13	(Scotland) Borders	Ravenhill, Belfast
19:30	Try: Ward; Feather; Con: Steinmetz (2); Pen: Humphreys	Report	Try: Cusiter; Con: Hore; Pen: Hore; Drop: Warnock; Cards: Cusiter (yellow card); Douglas (yellow card)	Attendance: 7,017; Referee: Phil Fear
Ulster lineup: 1. Ronan McCormack, 2. Paul Shields, 3. Simon Best, 4. Gary Longwell, 5. Matt McCullough, 6. Andy Ward, 7. Neil Best, 8. Roger Wilson, 9. Kieran Campbell, 10. David Humphreys, 11. Tyrone Howe, 12. Paul Steinmetz, 13. Kevin Maggs, 14. Tommy Bowe, 15. Bryn Cunningham.; Replacements: 16. Rory Best, 17. Rod Moore, 18. Tim Barker (for McCullough), 19. Campbell Feather (for N. Best), 20. Neil Doak, 21. Paddy Wallace, 22. Andy Maxwell (for Howe).				Attendance: 7,017; Referee: Phil Fear

8 April 2005	Cardiff Blues (Wales)	22–8	(Ireland) Ulster	Cardiff Arms Park
19:10	Try: Shanklin; Quinnell; Sowden-Taylor; Con: Macleod (2); Pen: Macleod	Report	Try: Bowe; Pen: Wallace	Attendance: 5,600; Referee: David Changleng
Ulster lineup: 1. Simon Best, 2. Paul Shields, 3. Rod Moore, 4. Gary Longwell, 5. Matt McCullough, 6. Andy Ward, 7. Gavin Pfister, 8. Roger Wilson, 9. Kieran Campbell, 10. Paddy Wallace, 11. Scott Young, 12. Paul Steinmetz, 13. Kevin Maggs, 14. Tommy Bowe, 15. Bryn Cunningham.; Replacements: 16. Nigel Brady, 17. Rowan McCormack (for Moore), 18. Rowan Frost (for Longwell), 19. Campbell Feather, 20. Neil Doak, 21. Adam Larkin (for Wallace), 22. Andy Maxwell (for S. Young).				Attendance: 5,600; Referee: David Changleng

15 April 2005	Ulster (Ireland)	16–3	(Wales) Llanelli Scarlets	Ravenhill, Belfast
19:05	Try: Steinmetz; Con: Steinmetz; Pen: Steinmetz (3)	Report	Pen: Bowen; Cards: Davies (yellow card)	Attendance: 7,948; Referee: Andy Ireland
Ulster lineup: 1. Simon Best, 2. Paul Shields, 3. Rod Moore, 4. Gary Longwell, 5. Matt McCullough, 6. Andy Ward, 7. Gavin Pfister, 8. Roger Wilson, 9. Kieran Campbell, 10. Paddy Wallace, 11. Scott Young, 12. Paul Steinmetz, 13. Kevin Maggs, 14. Tommy Bowe, 15. Bryn Cunningham.; Replacements: 16. Rory Best, 17. Rowan McCormack, 18. Rowan Frost (for Longwell), 19. Campbell Feather (for Pfister), 20. Neil Doak (for Campbell), 21. Adam Larkin (for Wallace), 22. Andy Maxwell (for S. Young).				Attendance: 7,948; Referee: Andy Ireland

== Celtic Cup ==
=== Quarter-final ===
22 April 2005	Neath-Swansea Ospreys (Wales)	23-16	(Ireland) Ulster	St Helen's, Swansea
	Try: Terblanche; Jones; Con: Jones (2); Pen: Jones (3); Cards: Cockbain (yellow card)	Report	Try: Penalty try Con: Humphreys; Pen: Humphreys (2); Cards: Moore (yellow card)	Attendance: 8,273; Referee: Andrew Ireland
Ulster lineup: 1. Simon Best, 2. Paul Shields, 3. Rod Moore, 4. Gary Longwell, 5. Matt McCullough, 6. Andy Ward, 7. Gavin Pfister, 8. Roger Wilson, 9. Kieran Campbell, 10. David Humphreys, 11. Tyrone Howe, 12. Paul Steinmetz, 13. Kevin Maggs, 14. Tommy Bowe, 15. Bryn Cunningham.; Replacements: 16. Rory Best (for Shields 73), 17. Ronan McCormack (for Moore, 67), 18. Rowan Frost (for Longwell 49), 19. Campbell Feather (for Pfister 56), 20. Neil Doak (for Campbell 66), 21. Paddy Wallace (for Cunningham 60), 22. Andy Maxwell (for Howe 52).				Attendance: 8,273; Referee: Andrew Ireland

=== Home attendance ===
Domestic League					European Cup					Total	
League	Fixtures	Average Attendance	Highest	Lowest	League	Fixtures	Average Attendance	Highest	Lowest	Total Attendance	Average Attendance
2004–05 Celtic League	10	6,693	8,145	5,638	2004–05 Heineken Cup	3	9,452	11,435	7,320	95,283	7,330

== Friendlies ==
13 August 2004	Rotherham Titans (Wales)	C-C	(Ireland) Ulster	Don Valley Stadium, Sheffield
		Report

20 August 2004	Ulster Rugby (Ireland)	19-26	(England) Harlequins	Ravenhill, Belfast
	Try: N. Best; Maxwell; Ward; Con: Wallace (2)	Report	Try: Jones; So'oialo; Reay; Sherriff; Con: Dunne (2); Staunton	Attendance: 6,100; Referee: Alain Rolland

28 August 2004	Newport Gwent Dragons (Wales)	30-7	(Ireland) Ulster	Rodney Parade, Newport
	Try: Black; Bryant; Anthony; Winn; Con: Sweeney (2); Pen: Sweeney (2)	Report	Try: Maxwell; Con: Wallace

== Ulster Rugby Awards ==
The Ulster Rugby Awards ceremony was held at the Ramada Hotel on 12 May 2005. Winners were:

- Bank of Ireland Ulster Player of the Year: Neil Best
- Guinness Ulster Rugby Personality of the Year: Tommy Bowe
- Club Ulster Supporters Player of the Year: Kieran Campbell
- Kukri Schools Player of the Year: David Pollock, Royal School Dungannon
- First Trust Bank Club of the Year: Ballymena RFC
- Calor Gas Youth Player of the Year: Nigel Newell, Ballynahinch RFC
- Dorrington B. Faulkner Award: Brian Reid, Coleraine RFC
- Northern Bank Coach of the Year: Gerald McCarter, City of Derry R.F.C., Ulster U21s
- Downtown Radio Club/PRO Media Liaison Officer of the Year: Joan Beatty, Enniskillen
- Belfast Telegraph Club Team of the Year: Ballymena RFC 2nd XV
- The Botanic Inns Merit Award: Suzanne Flemming
