= 2005–06 Celtic League =

Rugby competition

- Countries: Ireland; Scotland; Wales
- Champions: (Ireland) Ulster (1st title)
- Runners-up: (Ireland) Leinster
- Matches played: 110
- Attendance: 571,331 (average 5,194 per match)
- Tries scored: 484 (average 4.4 per match)
- Top point scorer: Felipe Contepomi (Leinster) (287 points)
- Top try scorer: Tommy Bowe (Ulster); Jason Forster (Newport Gwent Dragons) (10 tries)

Official website
- www.rabodirectpro12.com

The 2005–06 Celtic League was the fifth Celtic League season, and the third following the introduction of regional rugby in Wales. Eleven teams, from three countries participated. The final table was dominated by the Irish, with the top three spots taken by Ulster, Leinster and Munster respectively. The 2005–06 season was the first (and last) season for which the "free weekend" was awarded points for. Due to the odd number of teams participating, for every round of fixtures, one team has a so-called "free weekend". Each time this occurred, the team was awarded four points, so although at the end of the season it did not alter the positions (each team has a guaranteed 8 points), the table is skewed during the season according to the fixtures.

== Teams ==
Location of 2005–06 Celtic League teams in Great Britain and Ireland.
Winners; 2nd–4th place; Other teams.

Team	Stadium	Capacity	City, Area
(Scotland) Border Reivers	Netherdale	6,000	Galashiels, Scotland
(Wales) Cardiff Blues	Cardiff Arms Park (Note: Cardiff Blues played their final home game of the season in the Millennium Stadium.)	12,500	Cardiff, Wales
(Ireland) Connacht	Galway Sportsgrounds	5,500	Galway, Republic of Ireland
(Scotland) Edinburgh Gunners	Murrayfield Stadium	67,800 (Note: Although Murrayfield's full capacity is 67,800, only the lower section of the West Stand, with a capacity of 12,464, is generally opened for Edinburgh fixtures.)	Edinburgh, Scotland
(Scotland) Glasgow Warriors	Firhill Stadium; Hughenden Stadium (Note: Glasgow Warriors also played one home game at Old Anniesland.)	10,887; 6,000	Glasgow, Scotland
(Ireland) Leinster	Donnybrook Stadium (Note: Leinster also played two of the home games in the RDS Arena and another two in Lansdowne Road.)	6,500	Dublin, Republic of Ireland
(Wales) Llanelli Scarlets	Stradey Park (Note: Llanelli Scarlets played one of their home games at the Racecourse Ground in Wrexham.)	10,800	Llanelli, Wales
(Ireland) Munster	Thomond Park; Musgrave Park	13,200; 8,300	Limerick, Republic of Ireland; Cork, Republic of Ireland
(Wales) Newport Gwent Dragons	Rodney Parade	12,000	Newport, Wales
(Wales) Ospreys	Liberty Stadium	20,500	Swansea, Wales
(Ireland) Ulster	Ravenhill	12,800	Belfast, Northern Ireland

== Table ==
Pos	Team	Pld	W	D	L	PF	PA	PD	TF	TA	TBP	LBP	Pts
1	(Ireland) Ulster	20	15	1	4	510	347	+163	49	31	3	2	75
2	(Ireland) Leinster	20	14	0	6	545	427	+118	59	45	8	2	74
3	(Ireland) Munster	20	12	0	8	439	372	+67	49	42	7	3	66
4	(Wales) Cardiff Blues	20	11	0	9	475	389	+86	51	38	6	5	63
5	(Scotland) Edinburgh Gunners	20	11	0	9	418	415	+3	48	45	5	3	60
6	(Wales) Llanelli Scarlets	20	10	1	9	418	402	+16	49	37	3	4	57
7	(Wales) Ospreys	20	11	0	9	381	409	−28	33	38	1	2	55
8	(Wales) Newport Gwent Dragons	20	7	0	13	355	456	−101	40	51	2	7	45
9	(Scotland) Border Reivers	20	7	0	13	386	501	−115	39	59	1	7	44
10	(Ireland) Connacht	20	6	0	14	325	466	−141	28	51	1	4	37
11	(Scotland) Glasgow Warriors	20	5	0	15	371	439	−68	39	47	2	7	37
Under the standard bonus point system, points are awarded as follows: 4 points for a win; 2 points for a draw; 1 bonus point for scoring 4 tries (or more) (Try bonus); 1 bonus point for losing by 7 points (or fewer) (Losing bonus)
Due to the uneven number of participating teams, each team had two free weekends and were awarded 4 match points each time.
Source: RaboDirect PRO12

== Results ==
=== Round 1 ===
2 September 2005
19:10

Llanelli Scarlets (Wales)	15–21	(Scotland) Edinburgh Gunners
	Report

Stradey Park
Attendance: 5,688

2 September 2005
19:10

Munster (Ireland)	9–7	(Scotland) Border Reivers
	Report

Thomond Park
Attendance: 3,500

2 September 2005
19:30

Glasgow Warriors (Scotland)	15–21	(Wales) Newport Gwent Dragons
	Report

Hughenden
Attendance: 2,034

3 September 2005
14:30

Connacht (Ireland)	13–9	(Wales) Cardiff Blues
	Report

Sportsground
Attendance: 1,800

4 September 2005
17:10

Ospreys (Wales)	22–20	(Ireland) Leinster
	Report

Liberty Stadium
Attendance: 10,131

=== Round 2 ===
9 September 2005
19:10

Cardiff Blues (Wales)	22–25	(Ireland) Ulster
Try: Morgan; Con: Robinson; Pen: Robinson (5)	Report	Try: Bowe; Con: David Humphreys; Pen: David Humphreys (5); Drop: David Humphreys

Cardiff Arms Park
Attendance: 5,784
Referee: Rob Dickson

10 September 2005
16:00

Edinburgh Gunners (Scotland)	34–3	(Ireland) Connacht
	Report

Murrayfield
Attendance: 1,813

10 September 2005
17:00

Leinster (Ireland)	26–21	(Scotland) Glasgow Warriors
	Report

Donnybrook
Attendance: 3,700

10 September 2005
18:00

Munster (Ireland)	37–10	(Wales) Ospreys
	Report

Musgrave Park
Attendance: 6,700

11 September 2005
16:00

Border Reivers (Scotland)	15–24	(Wales) Llanelli Scarlets
	Report

Netherdale
Attendance: 850

=== Welsh Round 1 ===
- All-Welsh Round 5 matches played mid-week to allow Welsh teams to play in the Anglo-Welsh Cup.

13 September 2005
19:35

Ospreys (Wales)	15–9	(Wales) Newport Gwent Dragons
	Report

Liberty Stadium
Attendance: 7,749

14 September 2005
19:10

Cardiff Blues (Wales)	20–16	(Wales) Llanelli Scarlets
	Report

Cardiff Arms Park
Attendance: 6,254

=== Round 3 ===
16 September 2005
19:10

Leinster (Ireland)	33–14	(Wales) Newport Gwent Dragons
	Report

Donnybrook
Attendance: 3,700

16 September 2005
19:30

Ulster (Ireland)	30–23	(Scotland) Edinburgh Gunners
Try: Bowe; Trimble; Con: Humphreys; Pen: Humphreys (6)	Report	Try: Dewey; Leonelli; Con: Paterson (2); Pen: Paterson (2); Drop: Paterson

Ravenhill
Attendance: 7,799
Referee: Phil Fear

17 September 2005
17:30

Llanelli Scarlets (Wales)	25–17	(Ireland) Connacht
	Report

Racecourse Ground
Attendance: 3,042

17 September 2005
19:30

Glasgow Warriors (Scotland)	32–10	(Ireland) Munster
	Report

Hughenden
Attendance: 1,884

18 September 2005
16:00

Border Reivers (Scotland)	16–6	(Wales) Ospreys
	Report

Netherdale
Attendance: 1,023

=== Round 4 ===
23 September 2005
19:10

Munster (Ireland)	14–13	(Wales) Llanelli Scarlets
	Report

Musgrave Park
Attendance: 5,000

24 September 2005
14:30

Connacht (Ireland)	15–17	(Scotland) Border Reivers
	Report

Sportsground
Attendance: 650

24 September 2005
17:30

Newport Gwent Dragons (Wales)	19–22	(Ireland) Ulster
Try: Gough; Con: Warlow; Pen: Warlow (3); Drop: Warlow	Report	Try: N. Best (2); Trimble; Con: Wallace (2); Pen: Wallace

Rodney Parade
Attendance: 5,112

24 September 2005
19:30

Glasgow Warriors (Scotland)	23–28	(Wales) Cardiff Blues
	Report

Hughenden
Attendance: 1,404

25 September 2005
15:00

Edinburgh Gunners (Scotland)	24–18	(Wales) Ospreys
	Report

Murrayfield
Attendance: 2,471

=== Round 5 ===
30 September 2005
19:30

Edinburgh Gunners (Scotland)	28–12	(Scotland) Glasgow Warriors
	Report

Murrayfield
Attendance: 2,502

1 October 2005
14:00

Connacht (Ireland)	19–44	(Ireland) Munster
	Report

Sportsground
Attendance: 2,300

1 October 2005
17:30

Leinster (Ireland)	30–23	(Ireland) Ulster
Try: Hickie; Potts; Con: Contemomi; Pen: Contemomi (6)	Report	Try: Wallace; Best; Con: David Humphreys (2); Pen: David Humphreys (3)

Donnybrook
Attendance: 6,500
Referee: Olan Trevor

=== Round 6 ===
7 October 2005
19:10

Ulster (Ireland)	36–10	(Ireland) Connacht
Try: R. Best; Bowe; Topping; McCullough; Trimble; Con: Humphreys (2); Cunningham; Wallace; Pen: Cunningham	Report	Try: Matthews; Con: Robinson; Pen: Warwick

Ravenhill
Attendance: 9,546
Referee: Alain Rolland

7 October 2005
19:30

Border Reivers (Scotland)	23–11	(Scotland) Edinburgh Gunners
	Report

Netherdale
Attendance: 2,646

9 October 2005
15:00

Munster (Ireland)	33–9	(Ireland) Leinster
	Report

Musgrave Park
Attendance: 7,500

=== Round 7 ===
14 October 2005
19:10

Ospreys (Wales)	18–17	(Ireland) Connacht
	Report

Liberty Stadium
Attendance: 5,511

14 October 2005
19:30

Edinburgh Gunners (Scotland)	17–15	(Wales) Newport Gwent Dragons
	Report

Murrayfield
Attendance: 2,460

15 October 2005
17:30

Leinster (Ireland)	34–15	(Wales) Cardiff Blues
	Report

RDS Arena
Attendance: 7,000

15 October 2005
19:30

Border Reivers (Scotland)	0–27	(Ireland) Ulster
	Report	Try: Topping; N. Best; Boss; Con: Humphreys (3); Pen: Humphreys (2)

Netherdale
Attendance: 1,857
Referee: Phil Fear

16 October 2005
16:10

Llanelli Scarlets (Wales)	24–20	(Scotland) Glasgow Warriors
	Report

Stradey Park
Attendance: 6,333

=== Round 8 ===
4 November 2005
19:10

Ulster (Ireland)	12–20	(Wales) Ospreys
Pen: Steinmetz (4)	Report	Try: Spice; Pen: Connor (4); Drop: Connor

Ravenhill
Attendance: 9,310
Referee: Ian Heard

4 November 2005
19:30

Cardiff Blues (Wales)	16–18	(Ireland) Munster
	Report

Cardiff Arms Park
Attendance: 6,107

4 November 2005
19:30

Glasgow Warriors (Scotland)	30–15	(Ireland) Connacht
	Report

Hughenden
Attendance: 1,518

6 November 2005
15:00

Leinster (Ireland)	13–27	(Scotland) Edinburgh Gunners
	Report

Donnybrook
Attendance: 1,700

6 November 2005
16:10

Newport Gwent Dragons (Wales)	20–16	(Scotland) Border Reivers
	Report

Rodney Parade
Attendance: 3,551

=== Round 9 ===
3 December 2005
14:00

Connacht (Ireland)	9–21	(Ireland) Leinster
	Report

Sportsground
Attendance: 2,250

3 December 2005
19:10

Munster (Ireland)	17–20	(Ireland) Ulster
Try: D. Wallace; Flannery; Con: O'Gara (2); Drop: O'Gara	Report	Try: Bowe; Andrew Trimble; Con: Humphreys (2); Pen: Humphreys (2)

Musgrave Park
Attendance: 6,000
Referee: Alain Rolland

4 December 2005
15:00

Glasgow Warriors (Scotland)	46–6	(Scotland) Edinburgh Gunners
	Report

Firhill
Attendance: 2,003

=== Welsh Round 2 ===
- All-Welsh Round 9 matches postponed to allow Welsh teams to play in the Anglo-Welsh Cup.

22 December 2005
19:35

Ospreys (Wales)	9–28	(Wales) Cardiff Blues
	Report

Liberty Stadium
Attendance: 11,016

23 December 2005
19:10

Newport Gwent Dragons (Wales)	16–28	(Wales) Llanelli Scarlets
	Report

Rodney Parade
Attendance: 5,763

=== Round 10 ===
26 December 2005
15:00

Edinburgh Gunners (Scotland)	30–25	(Scotland) Border Reivers
	Report

Murrayfield
Attendance: 3,818

26 December 2005
17:00

Ulster (Ireland)	19–24	(Ireland) Leinster
Try: Bowe; Con: Humphreys; Pen: Humphreys (4)	Report	Try: D'Arcy; Dempsey; Con: Contepomi; Pen: Contepomi (4)

Ravenhill
Attendance: 12,300
Referee: George Clancy

27 December 2005
16:10

Cardiff Blues (Wales)	41–23	(Wales) Newport Gwent Dragons
	Report

Cardiff Arms Park
Attendance: 12,488

27 December 2005
19:35

Munster (Ireland)	36–17	(Ireland) Connacht
	Report

Thomond Park
Attendance: 8,000

=== Round 11 ===
31 December 2005
13:00

Leinster (Ireland)	35–23	(Ireland) Munster
	Report

RDS Arena
Attendance: 14,135

31 December 2005
14:00

Border Reivers (Scotland)	24–13	(Scotland) Glasgow Warriors
	Report

Netherdale
Attendance: 2,107

31 December 2005
14:00

Connacht (Ireland)	22–12	(Ireland) Ulster
Try: Slemen; Lacey; McPhillips; Con: Slemen (2); Pen: Slemen	Report	Pen: Humphreys (4)

Sportsground
Attendance: 2,100
Referee: Alan Lewis

1 January 2006
15:10

Newport Gwent Dragons (Wales)	24–14	(Wales) Ospreys
	Report

Rodney Parade
Attendance: 6,115

2 January 2006
16:10

Llanelli Scarlets (Wales)	32–13	(Wales) Cardiff Blues
	Report

Stradey Park
Attendance: 9,364

=== Round 12 ===
6 January 2006
19:10

Newport Gwent Dragons (Wales)	27–19	(Ireland) Connacht
	Report

Rodney Parade
Attendance: 4,773

7 January 2006
15:30

Ulster (Ireland)	25–23	(Scotland) Glasgow Warriors
Try: Humphreys; Con: Humphreys; Pen: Humphreys (6)	Report	Try: Hamilton; Morrison; Con: Parks (2); Pen: Parks (3)

Ravenhill
Attendance: 6,487
Referee: Phil Fear

7 January 2006
17:30

Llanelli Scarlets (Wales)	20–18	(Ireland) Leinster
	Report

Stradey Park
Attendance: 6,126

7 January 2006
19:30

Edinburgh Gunners (Scotland)	17–18	(Ireland) Munster
	Report

Murrayfield
Attendance: 3,525

8 January 2006
16:00

Border Reivers (Scotland)	26–23	(Wales) Cardiff Blues
	Report

Netherdale
Attendance: 3,879

=== Round 13 ===
27 January 2006
19:10

Cardiff Blues (Wales)	9–13	(Scotland) Edinburgh Gunners
	Report

Cardiff Arms Park
Attendance: 4,943

27 January 2006
19:30

Glasgow Warriors (Scotland)	8–22	(Wales) Ospreys
	Report

Old Anniesland
Attendance: 1,335

27 January 2006
19:30

Leinster (Ireland)	62–14	(Scotland) Border Reivers
	Report

Donnybrook
Attendance: 4,125

27 January 2006
19:30

Ulster (Ireland)	30–13	(Wales) Llanelli Scarlets
Try: Howe; Maxwell; Con: Steinmetz; Pen: Steinmetz (6)	Report	Try: James; Con: Davies (2)

Ravenhill
Attendance: 7,986
Referee: Peter Allan

28 January 2006
17:30

Munster (Ireland)	10–8	(Wales) Newport Gwent Dragons
	Report

Musgrave Park
Attendance: 5,000

=== Round 14 ===
17 February 2006
19:10

Ospreys (Wales)	22–18	(Scotland) Border Reivers
	Report

Liberty Stadium
Attendance: 6,573

17 February 2006
19:30

Edinburgh Gunners (Scotland)	23–31	(Ireland) Ulster
Try: Hodge; Penalty try Con: Hodge (2); Pen: Hodge (3)	Report	Try: Maxwell (2); Boss; Con: Humphreys (2); Pen: Humphreys (4)

Murrayfield
Attendance: 3,559
Referee: Nigel Whitehouse

18 February 2006
14:30

Connacht (Ireland)	33–19	(Wales) Llanelli Scarlets
	Report

Sportsground
Attendance: 2,300

18 February 2006
15:30

Munster (Ireland)	20–26	(Scotland) Glasgow Warriors
	Report

Thomond Park
Attendance: 5,000

18 February 2006
17:30

Newport Gwent Dragons (Wales)	31–18	(Ireland) Leinster
	Report

Rodney Parade
Attendance: 5,117

=== Round 15 ===
3 March 2006
19:10

Cardiff Blues (Wales)	40–14	(Wales) Ospreys
	Report

Cardiff Arms Park
Attendance: 7,165

3 March 2006
19:30

Glasgow Warriors (Scotland)	8–20	(Scotland) Border Reivers
	Report

Firhill
Attendance: 1,406

3 March 2006
19:35

Ulster (Ireland)	27–3	(Ireland) Munster
Try: Bowe; Steinmetz; McMillan; Wilson; Harrison; Con: Humphreys	Report	Pen: Burke

Ravenhill
Attendance: 12,300
Referee: Alain Rolland

5 March 2006
17:15

Leinster (Ireland)	16–13	(Ireland) Connacht
	Report

Donnybrook
Attendance: 3,573

=== Round 16 ===
24 March 2006
19:10

Cardiff Blues (Wales)	31–3	(Scotland) Glasgow Warriors
	Report

Cardiff Arms Park
Attendance: 4,508

24 March 2006
19:30

Border Reivers (Scotland)	9–11	(Ireland) Connacht
	Report

Netherdale
Attendance: 702

25 March 2006
15:30

Ulster (Ireland)	24–17	(Wales) Newport Gwent Dragons
Try: Bowe; Humphreys; Cunningham; Con: Humphreys (3); Pen: Humphreys	Report	Try: Jones; Luscombe; Con: Warlow (2); Pen: Warlow

Ravenhill
Attendance: 7,546

26 March 2006
16:10

Ospreys (Wales)	24–17	(Scotland) Edinburgh Gunners
	Report

Liberty Stadium
Attendance: 5,413

=== Round 10 rescheduled match ===
31 March 2006
19:10

Llanelli Scarlets (Wales)	30–17	(Wales) Ospreys
	Report

Stradey Park
Attendance: 10,832

=== Round 17 ===
7 April 2006
19:10

Newport Gwent Dragons (Wales)	23–17	(Ireland) Munster
	Report

Rodney Parade
Attendance: 5,433

7 April 2006
19:30

Edinburgh Gunners (Scotland)	10–21	(Wales) Cardiff Blues
	Report

Murrayfield
Attendance: 2,304

7 April 2006
21:00

Border Reivers (Scotland)	34–35	(Ireland) Leinster
	Report

Netherdale
Attendance: 1,307

8 April 2006
17:30

Ospreys (Wales)	16–13	(Scotland) Glasgow Warriors
	Report

Liberty Stadium
Attendance: 4,000

=== Round 18 ===
14 April 2006
19:10

Leinster (Ireland)	30–22	(Wales) Llanelli Scarlets
	Report

Lansdowne Road
Attendance: 7,250

15 April 2006
14:30

Connacht (Ireland)	15–10	(Wales) Newport Gwent Dragons
	Report

Sportsground
Attendance: 1,800

15 April 2006
17:30

Cardiff Blues (Wales)	46–11	(Scotland) Border Reivers
	Report

Cardiff Arms Park
Attendance: 5,500

15 April 2006
17:30

Glasgow Warriors (Scotland)	18–27	(Ireland) Ulster
Try: Beattie; O'Hare; Con: Parks; Pen: Parks (2)	Report	Try: Harrison; Boss; Con: Humphreys; Pen: Humphreys (5)

Firhill
Attendance: 2,240
Referee: Tim Hayes

15 April 2006
19:30

Munster (Ireland)	36–15	(Scotland) Edinburgh Gunners
	Report

Thomond Park
Attendance: 9,000

=== Welsh Round 3 ===
- All-Welsh Round 6 matches played mid-week to allow Welsh teams to play in the Anglo-Welsh Cup.

18 April 2006
19:10

Ospreys (Wales)	25–13	(Wales) Llanelli Scarlets
	Report

Liberty Stadium
Attendance: 15,183

19 April 2006
19:35

Newport Gwent Dragons (Wales)	13–18	(Wales) Cardiff Blues
	Report

Rodney Parade
Attendance: 7,113

=== Round 15 rescheduled match ===
- This match was postponed from the weekend of 4 March to allow Llanelli Scarlets to play in the Anglo-Welsh Cup semi-final.

22 April 2006
17:30

Llanelli Scarlets (Wales)	36–17	(Wales) Newport Gwent Dragons
	Report

Stradey Park
Attendance: 6,500

=== Round 19 ===
28 April 2006
19:10

Newport Gwent Dragons (Wales)	32–18	(Scotland) Glasgow Warriors
	Report

Rodney Parade
Attendance: 3,850

28 April 2006
19:30

Border Reivers (Scotland)	25–41	(Ireland) Munster
	Report

Netherdale
Attendance: 1,266

28 April 2006
19:30

Edinburgh Gunners (Scotland)	35–18	(Wales) Llanelli Scarlets
	Report

Murrayfield
Attendance: 2,122

29 April 2006
17:30

Cardiff Blues (Wales)	30–12	(Ireland) Connacht
	Report

Cardiff Arms Park
Attendance: 6,423

29 April 2006
19:35

Leinster (Ireland)	38–21	(Wales) Ospreys
	Report

Lansdowne Road
Attendance: 6,455

=== Round 20 ===
5 May 2006
18:30

Connacht (Ireland)	16–22	(Scotland) Edinburgh Gunners
	Report

Sportsground
Attendance: 2,100

5 May 2006
19:10

Ospreys (Wales)	27–10	(Ireland) Munster
	Report

Liberty Stadium
Attendance: 7,843

5 May 2006
21:00

Ulster (Ireland)	26–17	(Wales) Cardiff Blues
Try: Wilson; Penalty try Con: Humphreys (2); Pen: Humphreys (4)	Report	Try: Robinson; Pen: Macleod (4)

Ravenhill
Attendance: 9,617
Referee: Andy Ireland

6 May 2006
16:10

Llanelli Scarlets (Wales)	30–26	(Scotland) Border Reivers
	Report

Stradey Park
Attendance: 5,033

7 May 2006
19:30

Glasgow Warriors (Scotland)	18–21	(Ireland) Leinster
	Report

Firhill
Attendance: 1,129

=== Round 16 rescheduled match ===
9 May 2006
19:05

Llanelli Scarlets (Wales)	18–6	(Ireland) Munster
	Report

Stradey Park
Attendance: 5,754

=== Round 21 ===
12 May 2006
18:30

Connacht (Ireland)	16–44	(Wales) Ospreys
	Report

Sportsground
Attendance: 1,500

12 May 2006
19:10

Glasgow Warriors (Scotland)	17–10	(Wales) Llanelli Scarlets
	Report

Firhill
Attendance: 1,014

12 May 2006
19:30

Ulster (Ireland)	63–17	(Scotland) Border Reivers
Try: Bowe (2); Wallace; Maxwell (2); Wilson; Trimble (2); Ferris; Con: Humphreys (6); Pen: Humphreys (2)	Report	Try: Moffat; Danielli; Con: MacRae (2); Pen: MacRae

Ravenhill
Attendance: 8,932
Referee: James Jones

13 May 2006
17:30

Newport Gwent Dragons (Wales)	11–37	(Scotland) Edinburgh Gunners
	Report

Rodney Parade
Attendance: 4,637

14 May 2006
18:10

Cardiff Blues (Wales)	40–31	(Ireland) Leinster
	Report

Millennium Stadium
Attendance: 15,327

=== Round 17 rescheduled match ===
- This match was postponed from the weekend of 9 April to allow Llanelli Scarlets to play in the Anglo-Welsh Cup Final.

19 May 2006
19:10

Llanelli Scarlets (Wales)	12–12	(Ireland) Ulster
Try: John (2); Con: Evans	Report	Try: Bowe; Maxwell; Con: Humphreys

Stradey Park
Attendance: 6,425
Referee: Graeme Hannah

=== Round 22 ===
26 May 2006
18:30

Connacht (Ireland)	33–7	(Scotland) Glasgow Warriors
	Report

Sportsground
Attendance: 1,100

26 May 2006
19:10

Edinburgh Gunners (Scotland)	8–31	(Ireland) Leinster
	Report

Murrayfield
Attendance: 2,364

26 May 2006
19:10

Ospreys (Wales)	17–19	(Ireland) Ulster
Try: Spice; Vaughton; Con: Henson (2); Pen: Henson	Report	Try: McCullough; Con: Humphreys; Pen: Humphreys (2); Drop: Humphreys

Liberty Stadium
Attendance: 10,316
Referee: David Changeleng

26 May 2006
19:30

Border Reivers (Scotland)	43–5	(Wales) Newport Gwent Dragons
	Report

Netherdale
Attendance: 1,233

27 May 2006
17:30

Munster (Ireland)	37–8	(Wales) Cardiff Blues
	Report

Thomond Park
Attendance: 13,200

== Leading scorers ==
Note: Flags to the left of player names indicate national team as has been defined under IRB eligibility rules, or primary nationality for players who have not yet earned international senior caps. Players may hold one or more non-IRB nationalities.

=== Top points scorers ===
Rank	Player	Club	Points
1	(Argentina) Felipe Contepomi	(Ireland) Leinster	287
2	(Ireland) David Humphreys	(Ireland) Ulster	229
3	(Wales) Nicky Robinson	(Wales) Cardiff Blues	173
4	(Scotland) Dan Parks	(Scotland) Glasgow Warriors	125
5	(Scotland) Chris Paterson	(Scotland) Edinburgh Gunners	122

=== Top try scorers ===
Rank	Player	Club	Tries
1	(Ireland) Tommy Bowe	(Ireland) Ulster	10
1	(Wales) Jason Forster	(Wales) Newport Gwent Dragons	10
3	(Argentina) Felipe Contepomi	(Ireland) Leinster	9
4	(Scotland) Nikki Walker	(Scotland) Border Reivers	8
5	(Wales) Chris Czekaj	(Wales) Cardiff Blues	7
