= Matt McCullough =

Irish rugby union player

Harry Sheridan
- Born: 9 September 1981 (age 45)
- Height: 1.98 m (6 ft 6 in)
- Weight: 110 kg (17 st; 240 lb)
- School: Ballymena Academy
- University: Trinity College Dublin; University of Ulster

Rugby union career
- Position(s): lock, flanker
Amateur team(s)
Years	Team	Apps	(Points)
- Ballymena R.F.C.
Senior career
Years	Team	Apps	(Points)
2001-2009	Ulster	130	(40)
International career
Years	Team	Apps	(Points)
2005	Ireland	4	

Matt McCullough (born 9 September 1981) is a former Irish rugby union player, who played in the second row for Ulster and Ireland

McCullough was educated at Ballymena Academy, captaining the school's 1st XV to the 2000 Ulster Schools' Cup final, and represented Ulster and Ireland at schools level. He was named Ulster Schools Player of the Year in the 2000 Ulster Rugby Awards. He studied at Trinity College Dublin, but left when he was offered a contract at Ulster in 2001, and continued his studies at the University of Ulster at Jordanstown.

He made his first appearance for Ulster against Connacht in the 2001–02 season, but saw little action in his early seasons with the province, while turning out for Ballymena in the All-Ireland League and captaining the Ireland under-21 team. He made 21 appearances, including 17 start, for Ulster in the 2003–04 season, and 26 appearances, including 25 starts, in the 2004–05 season, and his form was rewarded with selection for the 2005 Ireland tour of Japan. He won two caps on that tour, and two more against New Zealand and Australia in the 2005 autumn internationals.

In the 2005–06 season he made 23 appearances, all starts, for Ulster as they won the Celtic League. In the summer of 2006, after playing for Ireland A in the Churchill Cup, he was badly injured in a car crash in the Canadian Rockies, sustaining a deep head wound, and credits teammates Andy Maxwell and Roger Wilson with helping to save his life. Gavin Mairs, "McCullough: Roger and Maxy saved my life", Belfast Telegraph, 6 October 2006</
