= Conor O'Loughlin =

- Born: Conor O'Loughlin; 16 July 1983 (age 43) Galway, Ireland
- Height: 1.73 m (5 ft 8 in)
- Weight: 12 st 13 lb (82 kg)
- School: Marist College
- University: University College Cork; University College Dublin

Rugby union career
- Position: Scrum-half
Amateur team(s)
Years	Team	Apps	(Points)
- Buccaneers
–	UCG		
Senior career
Years	Team	Apps	(Points)
–2011	Connacht	98	(105)
International career
Years	Team	Apps	(Points)
2007	Ireland A	1	(0)

Conor O'Loughlin (born 16 July 1983) is a former Irish rugby union player for Connacht in the Celtic League. He played at scrum half. He retired due to a hip injury in 2011.

Following his rugby career O'Loughlin founded Glofox, a business management software development company that services fitness studios and gyms. The software is used in thousands of businesses worldwide. In June 2016, Glofox announced that it had received funding from EI plus Growing Capital to the amount of €500K. It subsequently went on to raise an additional €22m in venture capital over the next 6 years before being acquired by ABC fitness in August 2022 for a sum reported to be above €200m

In September 2026, O'Loughlin was appointed chief executive officer of EcoOnline, an environmental, health, and safety (EHS) software provider backed by private equity firm Apax Partners.

== Awards and honours ==
On 22 April 2018, O'Loughlin received the title of Ireland''s Best Young Entrepreneur for 2018.

In 2020, O'Loughlin was nominated for EY Entrepreneur of the Year Award.
