= Simon Hillary =

- Born: Simon Denis Hillary; 16 July 1992 (age 33) Dublin, Ireland
- Height: 1.82 m (6 ft 0 in)
- Weight: 87 kg (13 st 10 lb)
- School: Blackrock College
- University: Trinity College Dublin

Rugby union career
- Position: Wing
Senior career
Years	Team	Apps	(Points)
2010-present	Leinster	3	(5)

Simon Hillary (born 16 July 1992) is a professional rugby union player who plays as a winger for Leinster Rugby.
