= Scrum-half =

Scrum-half is the name of playing positions in both rugby football sports:

- Scrum-half (rugby league)
- Scrum-half (rugby union)
