= Ciarán Potts =

- Born: 14 October 1982 (age 44) Dublin, Ireland
- Height: 1.98 mm (0 in)
- Weight: 106 kg (16 st 10 lb; 234 lb)

Rugby union career
- Position: Back Row
Provincial / State sides
Years	Team	Apps	(Points)
2003–2006	Leinster	31	((10, 2 T))

Ciarán Potts is a former professional rugby union player. He was forced to retire prematurely due to injury in 2006. He played for Leinster Rugby and was seen as a bright prospect. A particular strength of his game was his ability as a line-out option in the backrow, given his large height for his position (6 feet 6 inches, or 1.98 m).
