= Tommy Bowe =

Ireland international rugby union player

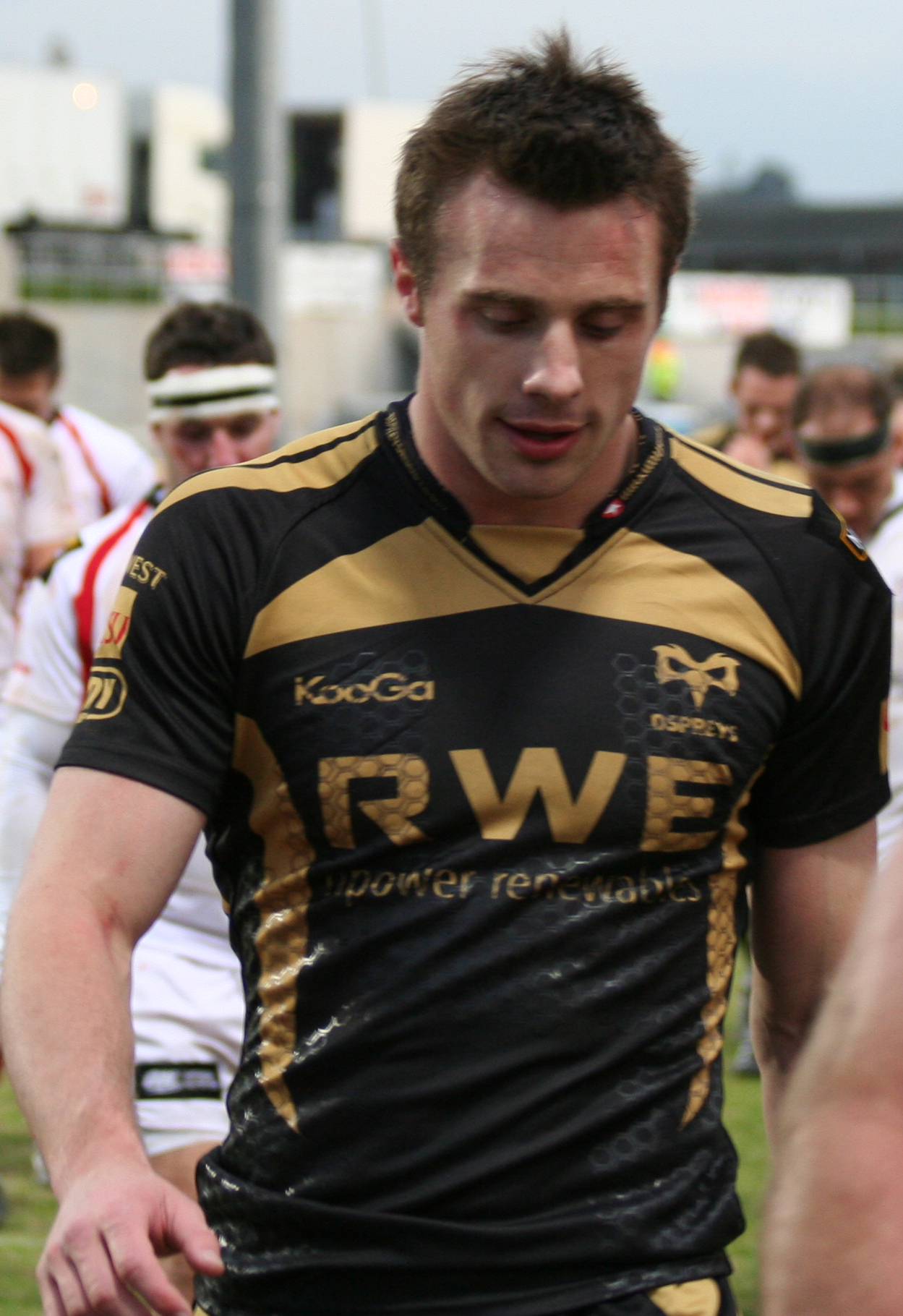
- Bowe playing for Ospreys
- Born: Thomas John Bowe; 22 February 1984 (age 42) Emyvale, County Monaghan, Ireland
- Height: 1.91 m (6 ft 3 in)
- Weight: 98 kg (15 st 6 lb; 216 lb)
- School: Royal School, Armagh
- University: University of Ulster; University of London
- Notable relative: Hannah Bowe (sister)

Rugby union career
- Position(s): Wing, Centre
Youth career
- Monaghan RFC
Amateur team(s)
Years	Team	Apps	(Points)
- Queen's University
–	Belfast Harlequins		
Senior career
Years	Team	Apps	(Points)
2003–2008	Ulster	91	(170)
2008–2012	Ospreys	77	(185)
2012–2018	Ulster	77	(140)
- Correct as of 28 April 2018
International career
Years	Team	Apps	(Points)
2004–2005	Ireland U21		
2005–2008	Ireland A	4	(5)
2004–2017	Ireland	69	(150)
2009, 2013	British & Irish Lions	5	(0)
- Correct as of 10 March 2017

Thomas John Bowe (born 22 February 1984) is a former Irish rugby union player from County Monaghan, Ireland who has successfully transitioned into business, media and podcasting.

He played on the wing for Ulster, Ospreys, Ireland and the British & Irish Lions.

After his playing career, Bowe has taken up television presenting, and is a host of morning television show Ireland AM alongside running successful brands in the footwear and clothing industry.

== Career ==
=== Early career ===
A former pupil of The Royal School, Armagh, Bowe was a schoolboy provincial full-back, only converting to wing whilst playing for Ireland U-21s. Bowe also ran for the Glaslough Harriers and represented his local parish Donagh in the All-Ireland Community Games.

Bowe played Gaelic football from under-10 level with Emyvale, his local GAA club, and later represented Monaghan at under-16 and Minor level. He also played rugby with Monaghan RFC at underage levels, as well as representing his primary school team.

He attended the University of Ulster, Jordanstown and played for the Queen's University Belfast rugby team, earning a selection to the Ireland U20 Team before transferring to Belfast Harlequins. He was subsequently capped at U21 level and was named the Irish Rugby Union Players Association (IRUPA) Young Player of the Year in 2003.

=== Club career ===
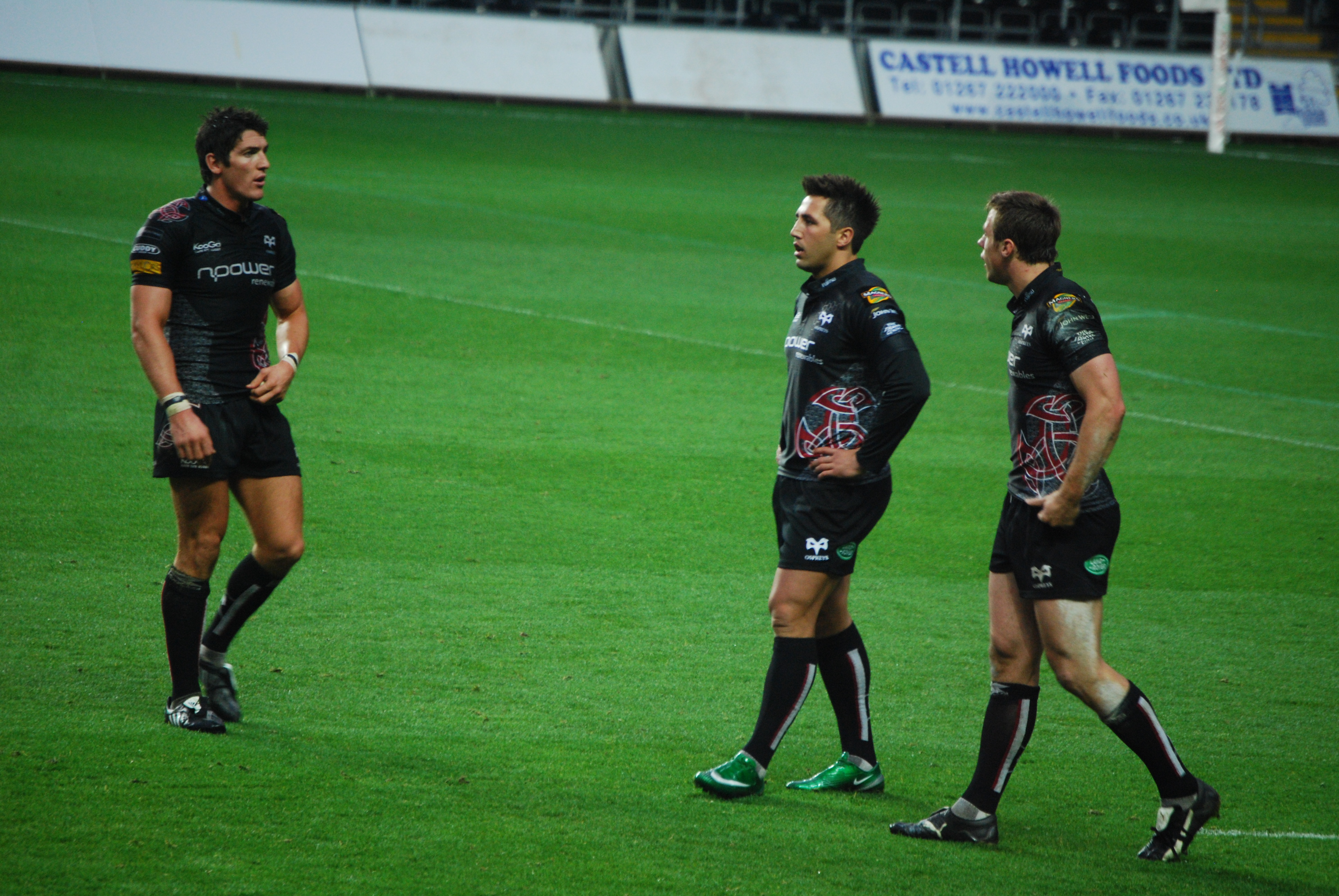
James Hook, Gavin Henson and Tommy Bowe playing for Ospreys

Bowe received a call-up to the Ulster squad at the end of the 2003–04 season, scoring on his debut against Connacht and soon made his name as an Ulster regular. He was named IRUPA Young Player of the Year in May 2004. He won the Guinness Ulster Rugby Personality of the Year Award at the Ulster Rugby Awards Dinner in May 2005. In 2006 Bowe won his first Celtic League title for Ulster.

On 25 January 2008 he confirmed that he would leave Ulster at the end of the 2008 Celtic League season, to join the Ospreys on a two-year deal. In his first season with the Welsh club, he scored a club-record four European Cup tries in a match against Treviso, as well as becoming the leading Magners League try-scorer, having scored the most tries in the league's history. In 2008, he won both the Ulster and Ireland Player of the Year awards. In December 2009 it was announced that Bowe had signed a 3-year extension with the Ospreys.

He returned to Ulster at the start of the 2012/13 season on a 3-year deal. He scored 2 tries on his return for Ulster against Cardiff Blues and was instrumental in the province's league season, helping them to the Pro12 Final.

=== International career ===
Bowe made his senior international debut against the USA during the 2004 Autumn Internationals becoming the first player from County Monaghan to win an Ireland cap since the 1920s, marking his introduction to test rugby with a second half try. Bowe won further caps during Ireland's tour to Japan and their Autumn Internationals in 2005.

With that experience and an impressive run of form for Ulster in the Celtic League, he made the 22-man panel for Ireland's 2006 Six Nations opener against Italy, and went on to score a try in that game. After Ireland's poor first half against France in the following Championship match, Bowe was axed from the squad – prompting allegations of him being made a scapegoat by Ireland boss Eddie O'Sullivan.

An injury-plagued latter part of 2006 precipitated a downturn in form, though a rejuvenated Bowe came back with 5 tries in 6 matches to earn his place in Ireland's 2007 Six Nations squad. He failed to make the Irish squad for the disappointing 2007 Rugby World Cup. Bowe earned himself a place in Ireland's original 2008 Six Nations squad after a very good season with Ulster.

He was overlooked for the Ireland match day squad to play Italy in the tournament's opening game, however, despite his form. He was again excluded from the squad the following week when Ireland were narrowly defeated by France in Paris, however on 19 February 2008 Bowe was named in the starting team at for the visit of Scotland to Croke Park, a match in which he scored two tries. He then played in the losses to Wales and England

With his good form for the Ospreys continuing in 2008 Bowe retained his right-wing position for Ireland during the Autumn internationals, scoring the team's only try against Argentina. Bowe was then selected on the wing for the 2009 Six Nations opener against France in Dublin. Bowe impressed as Ireland claimed their first win over France in six years with 30–21 triumph. Their next game was against Italy. Bowe scored a try as Ireland won 38–9.

After wins against England and Scotland, Ireland took on Wales with a Grand Slam at stake. Bowe scored a try and Ireland won their first Grand Slam for 61 years.

In February 2010 against England in the 2010 Six Nations Championship, he scored two tries including the clinching try with five minutes remaining in a 20–16 win at Twickenham. In March 2010, Bowe was voted 2010 Six Nations Player of the Championship, gaining over 50% of the vote.

Bowe continued to represent Ireland throughout 2010. He was selected in Ireland's squad for the 2011 Six Nations Championship, and scored the opening try of Ireland's demolition of a Grand-Slam chasing England on 19 March. He went to the 2011 Rugby World Cup, his first such tournament, and scored a try against the US in Ireland's opening Pool C game. He was selected in the squad for the 2012 Six Nations Championship, during which he scored 5 tries in Ireland's first three games, including two each against Italy and France.

On 4 February 2017 Bowe came on for Keith Earls as a replacement in the 2017 Six Nations Championship against Scotland.

=== British & Irish Lions ===
On 21 April 2009, Bowe was named as a member of the British & Irish Lions for the 2009 tour to South Africa. He started in the first match on the tour, versus a Royal XV and, in this game, became the first try scorer of the 2009 tour. He then scored two tries against the Golden Lions which contributed to his selection for the test side. He wasn't included for the next two games before coming back for the match against Western Province where he scored his fourth try of the tour and set up another for Ugo Monye.

His form on the Tour was outstanding, winning him praise from the sporting media. On 18 June 2009, Ian McGeechan named Bowe in his test side to face South Africa in Durban on 20 June where The Lions lost 26–21 . Bowe, although holding his own in defence, wasn't given any opportunities to run. He was again selected on the wing for the second test. The Lions lost 28–25 due to a last minute penalty by Morné Steyn to clinch the series for the Springboks. Bowe in this game had more opportunities to run and was dangerous in attack. Due to injuries to Brian O'Driscoll and Jamie Roberts, Bowe was selected at outside centre in a partnership with Riki Flutey. He came third behind Wales' Jamie Roberts and England's Simon Shaw for the Player of the Series award.

In April 2013 he was selected as a member of the 2013 British & Irish Lions squad to tour Australia. While playing against the Queensland Reds, Bowe broke a bone in his hand, which threatened to end his Lions tour. He managed to recover from the injury in time to be included the starting fifteen in the last two tests against Australia, taking the place from Alex Cuthbert who had replaced him whilst he was injured, but was unable to score any points in the test series.

== International tries ==
Tommy Bowe's International Tries
Try	Opposing Team	City/Country	Venue	Competition	Year
[1]	United States	Dublin, Ireland	Lansdowne Road	Test Match	2004
[2]	Japan	Osaka, Japan	Nagai Stadium	Test Match	2005
[3]	Italy	Dublin, Ireland	Lansdowne Road	Six Nations	2006
[4–5]	Scotland	Dublin, Ireland	Croke Park	Six Nations	2008
[6–7]	Canada	Limerick, Ireland	Thomond Park	Test Match	2008
[8]	Argentina	Dublin, Ireland	Croke Park	Test Match	2008
[9]	Italy	Rome, Italy	Stadio Flaminio	Six Nations	2009
[10]	Wales	Cardiff, Wales	Millennium Stadium	Six Nations	2009
[11]	Australia	Dublin, Ireland	Croke Park	Test Match	2009
[12–13]	England	London, England	Twickenham	Six Nations	2010
[14]	Scotland	Dublin, Ireland	Croke Park	Six Nations	2010
[15]	New Zealand	New Plymouth, New Zealand	Yarrow Stadium	Test Match	2010
[16]	South Africa	Dublin, Ireland	Aviva Stadium	Test Match	2010
[17]	England	Dublin, Ireland	Aviva Stadium	Six Nations	2011
[18–19]	United States	New Plymouth, New Zealand	Yarrow Stadium	World Cup	2011
[20]	Wales	Dublin, Ireland	Aviva Stadium	Six Nations	2012
[21–22]	Italy	Dublin, Ireland	Aviva Stadium	Six Nations	2012
[23–24]	France	Saint Denis, France	Stade de France	Six Nations	2012
[25–26]	Argentina	Dublin, Ireland	Aviva Stadium	Test Match	2012
[27]	South Africa	Dublin, Ireland	Aviva Stadium	Test Match	2014
[28]	Australia	Dublin, Ireland	Aviva Stadium	Test Match	2014
[29–30]	Romania	London, England	Wembley Stadium	World Cup	2015

== International analysis by opposition ==
69 caps for Ireland.

Against	Played	Won	Lost	Drawn	Tries	Points	% Won
Argentina	5	3	2	0	3	15	60
Australia	7	2	4	1	2	10	28.57
Canada	1	1	0	0	2	10	100
England	8	4	4	0	3	15	50
France	6	3	2	1	2	10	50
Italy	7	7	0	0	4	20	100
Japan	2	2	0	0	1	5	100
New Zealand	6	0	6	0	1	5	0
Romania	2	2	0	0	2	10	100
Samoa	2	2	0	0	0	0	100
Scotland	9	6	3	0	3	15	66.67
South Africa	4	2	2	0	2	10	50
United States	2	2	0	0	3	15	100
Wales	8	2	6	0	2	10	25
Total	69	38	29	2	30	150	55.07

5 caps for British & Irish Lions.

Against	Played	Won	Lost	Drawn	Tries	Points	% Won
Australia	2	1	1	0	0	0	50
South Africa	3	1	2	0	0	0	33.33
Total	5	2	3	0	0	0	40

Correct as of 17 April 2023

== Honours ==
=== Individual ===
- IRUPA Young Player of the Year: 1 (2004)
- Guinness Ulster Rugby Personality of the Year Award: 1 (2005)
- Celtic League Team of the Year: 3 (2007–08, 2008–09, 2009–10)
- IRUPA Players' Player of the Year: 2 (2008, 2010)
- WRPA Players' Player of the Year Award: 1 (2010)
- Celtic League Player of the Year: 1 (2009–10)
- RBS Player of the Championship: 1 (2010)
- Guinness Rugby Writers of Ireland Player of the Year: 1 (2010)

=== Ulster ===
- Celtic League: 1 (2005–06)

=== Ospreys ===
- Celtic League: 2 (2009–10, 2011–12)

=== Ireland ===
- Six Nations: 2 (2009, 2015)
- Grand Slam: 1 (2009)
- Triple Crown: 2 (2006, 2009)
- 2005 Ireland rugby union tour of Japan Series win 1

=== British & Irish Lions ===
- Series winner: 1 (2013)

== Non-rugby ventures ==
=== Business ventures ===
In 2014, Bowe added a clothing line XV Kings to his earlier launched footwear brand Lloyd & Pryce. In 2024 Bowe expanded into the men's skincare market, launching the brand Flow by Bowe.

He lent his name to the Tommy Bowe Challenge which was completed in both 2011 and 2012 to raise money for the Glaslough Harriers.

=== Broadcasting career ===
In 2017, Bowe dipped his toe into television presenting becoming a co-presenter on BBC and RTE holiday program, Getaways. Then in 2018, Bowe was named as the presenter of Eir Sport's coverage of the Pro14 which started in August 2018.

Since August 2020 Bowe has been a host on Ireland AM, the morning television show of Virgin Media Television in Ireland.

Bowe moved into the world of podcasting, co-hosting The Offload with former teammate Donncha O'Callaghan.

Bowe was guest chef in episode two of series seven of The Restaurant in 2010. Bowe appeared on RTÉ's The Late Late Show on 21 May 2010 where he was quizzed on his version of the song "The Black Velvet Band" which he sang during Ireland's Grand Slam celebrations. Bowe was the focus of an RTÉ documentary Tommy Bowe's Bodycheck, which examined what it takes to be a top professional rugby player.

== Personal life ==
His father, Paul, won a Leinster Schools' Cup medal with Newbridge College on the 1970 team, captained by Mick Quinn and went on to win a cap for Leinster Schools. Ann, his mother, is a physiotherapist in County Monaghan who runs her own practice. Bowe's sister, Hannah, is an Ireland hockey international, and his younger brother, David, is a rugby union footballer.

Bowe married his fiancée, former Miss Wales Lucy Whitehouse, on 14 June 2015 at the Corran Resort and Spa in Carmarthenshire, Wales. They have two children together.
