= Alain Rolland =

Irish rugby union player

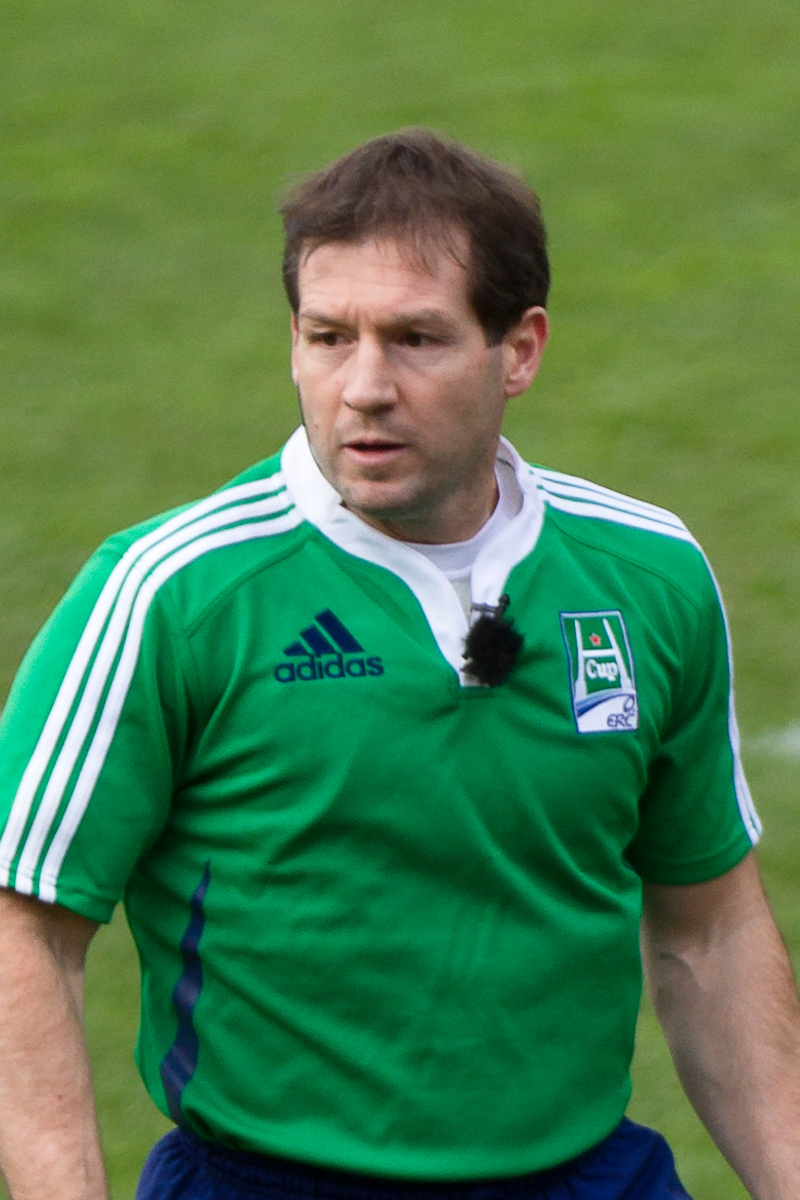
- Born: Alain Colm Pierre Rolland; 22 August 1966 (age 60) Dublin, Ireland
- Height: 1.72 m (5 ft 8 in)
- Weight: 76 kg (12 st 0 lb; 168 lb)
- Occupation: Mortgage broker

Rugby union career
- Position: Scrum half
Senior career
Years	Team	Apps	(Points)
- Blackrock
1996–1997	Moseley	11	
Provincial / State sides
Years	Team	Apps	(Points)
1989–1996	Leinster	40	
International career
Years	Team	Apps	(Points)
1990–1995	Ireland	3	(0)
Coaching career
- Years: Team
- 1993: Ireland Women
Refereeing career
Years	Competition		Apps
2003–2011	Rugby World Cup		
2001–2014	Test Matches		

Alain Colm Pierre Rolland (born 22 August 1966) is a former Ireland rugby union international and rugby union referee. He also played for Leinster. He refereed the final of the 2007 Rugby World Cup, and was an assistant referee in the final of the 2011 Rugby World Cup. In September 2013 he announced his intention to retire from refereeing at the end of the 2013/14 season.

== Playing career ==
During his playing days as a scrum-half, Rolland earned three caps for Ireland. He started the match on 27 October 1990 against Argentina, and gained further caps as a replacement against Italy in 1994 and the USA in 1995. He won 40 caps for Leinster, and played club rugby for Blackrock College. He also played 11 times for English club Moseley during the 1996/97 season.

== Refereeing career ==
Rolland retired as a player at the start of the professional era and began refereeing, with his first test appointment coming on 19 September 2001 when Wales beat Romania 81–9 at Cardiff's Millennium Stadium.

He made his Six Nations refereeing debut six months later, when France beat Scotland 22–10 at Murrayfield, with his first Tri-Nations match following in July 2003, with New Zealand's record 52–16 defeat of South Africa.

Rolland refereed in the 2003 and 2007 Rugby World Cups and was appointed to referee the final of the 2007 Rugby World Cup. Rolland, along with fellow Irishman George Clancy, was selected to a ten-man referee panel for the 2011 Rugby World Cup. He was an assistant referee in the final.

After the 2011 Rugby World Cup semi-final between Wales and France, for which Rolland was selected due to his fluency in French, owing to having a French father, Rolland received much criticism for awarding a red card to Welsh captain Sam Warburton in the 19th minute for a tackle which lifted France winger Vincent Clerc off the ground. Wales ultimately lost the semi-final to France, 9–8. The International Rugby Board however fully backed Rolland's decision with IRB referees manager, Paddy O'Brien stating the decision was "absolutely correct".

On 22 February 2014, Rolland refereed his last international match as Wales defeated France 27–6 in the 2014 Six Nations Championship at the Millennium Stadium in Cardiff.

He refereed his last major European contest on 24 May 2014 in the Heineken Cup final at the Millennium Stadium in which Toulon beat Saracens 23–6.

Rolland is a member of the Leinster Branch of Referees. In March 2016 Alain was appointed as World Rugby's 'High Performance 15s Match Officials' Manager', having previously worked as a mortgage broker in Dublin.
