= Andy Maxwell (rugby union, born 1981) =

Irish rugby union player

- Born: 17 July 1981 (age 45) Ballymena, County Antrim
- Height: 1.83 m (6 ft 0 in)
- Weight: 90 kg (14 st; 200 lb)

Rugby union career
- Position: Wing
Provincial / State sides
Years	Team	Apps	(Points)
2003-07	Ulster	40	(85)
2007-08	Edinburgh	11	(5)
- Correct as of 22-07-09
International career
Years	Team	Apps	(Points)
2006-	Ireland A	2	
- Correct as of 16-06-07
National sevens team
Years	Team		Comps
- Ireland 7s

Andy Maxwell is a former Irish rugby union player, previously of Ulster and Edinburgh. He joined the Ulster squad at the start of the 2003-04 season and made his Ulster debut against Edinburgh in September 2004 which he capped with a try.

Maxwell won his first Ireland A cap at the 2006 Churchill Cup tournament in the U.S. and Canada. He won two caps with appearances against the USA and New Zealand Maori. He has also represented Ireland at Sevens, U21, U19 and U18 levels. His speed and style of rugby is well suited to the seven aside game and he took part in the Rugby World Cup Sevens tournament in Hong Kong in summer 2005. At the end of the 2006-07 season, Maxwell left Ulster and moved to Edinburgh Rugby.

In May 2008 Maxwell decided to pursue a career outside professional rugby and left Edinburgh. He and a number of other Irish professionals, such as Ross McCarron and Simon Hillary, did this.

Maxwell is now a co-owner of the Irish burrito bar chain Boojum.
