= 2017–18 Ulster Rugby season =

Ulster Rugby
- 2017–18 season
- Head Coach: Jono Gibbes
- Director of Rugby: Les Kiss
- Captain: Rory Best
- Pro14: 4th in Conference B
- European Rugby Champions Cup: 3rd in Pool 1
- Top try scorer: League: Craig Gilroy (10); All: Craig Gilroy (11)
- Top points scorer: League: John Cooney (172); All: John Cooney (225)
Home colours	Away colours	Third colours

The 2017–18 season was Ulster's 24th season since the advent of professionalism in rugby union, and Jono Gibbes' only season as head coach. Rory Best was captain. They competed in the inaugural Pro14 (successor competition to the Pro12) and the European Rugby Champions Cup.

== Events ==
=== Competitions ===
The Pro12 became the Pro14 with the addition of two teams from South Africa. The fourteen teams were arranged in two conferences. Teams played the teams in their own conference and their regional rivals home and away, the teams in the other conference other than their regional rivals home or away. The first placed team in each conference would qualify for the semi-finals, with the second- and third-placed teams playing quarter-finals for the right to join them. The top three teams in each conference, not including the South African teams, would qualify for next season's Champions Cup, with the fourth-placed teams in each conference playing off for the seventh Champions Cup slot.

=== Personnel changes ===
After the departure of Neil Doak, Jono Gibbes joined Ulster as head coach, with Dwayne Peel joining him as assistant coach, replacing Allen Clarke, who had left to join the coaching staff at Ospreys. Aaron Dundon joined as scrum coach, with Niall Malone remaining as skills coach.

Out-half Paddy Jackson and centre Stuart Olding were charged with rape and suspended from playing pending trial (both would be acquitted, but have their contracts revoked). Australian out-half Christian Lealiifano was signed on a five-month loan to cover. Rory Best was restored to the captaincy. The IRFU had blocked South African scrum-half Ruan Pienaar extending his contract as part of their restrictions on foreign players, and he left for Montpellier. John Cooney was signed from Connacht to replace him. Other new arrivals were two South Africans, prop Schalk van der Merwe, signed from the Southern Kings, and loose forward Jean Deysel, signed from the Sharks. Back row forward Roger Wilson retired, lock Conor Joyce and centre Mark Best moved to Jersey Reds, hooker Johnny Murphy went to Rotherham Titans, and lock John Donnan, flankers Lorcan Dow and Stephen Mullholand, and prop Ricky Lutton were released.

Players joining the academy this year were out-half Michael Lowry and centre James Hume, from RBAI's three-time Schools' Cup-winning team; prop Tom O'Toole from Campbell College; lock/back row Matthew Dalton, from BRA, hooker Alexander Clarke (son of former Ulster hooker and assistant coach Allen Clarke), from Ballymena Academy; flanker Joe Dunleavy, from City of Derry R.F.C.; lock John McCusker, from Rainey Old Boys R.F.C.; lock Jack Regan; flanker Greg Jones and prop Eric O'Sullivan. Wing Robert Baloucoune and scrum-half Graham Curtis joined later in the season.

=== Season ===
After a poor run of form, with eighteen tries conceded in four matches over the Christmas period, Director of Rugby Les Kiss left in January, with Gibbes assuming all coaching responsibility of the team for the remainder of the season. Ulster finished third in Pool 1 of the Champions Cup, failing to qualify for the knockout stage. They finished fourth of seven in Conference B of the Pro14, failing to qualify for the playoffs, and having to beat Ospreys in a playoff to qualify for next season's Champions Cup. Gibbes cut short his contract at the end of the season. Former Ireland captain Brian O'Driscoll described the province as "a bit of a basket case", facing "Administration issues, senior players retiring, the well documented court case, now no number 10 to build the team around, no coach next year, struggling for Champions Cup rugby next season."

Academy flanker Nick Timoney had a breakthrough season, making twenty appearances and scoring five tries. John Cooney was Ulster's leading scorer with 225 points; he was the Pro14's top scorer with 175 points, and made the Pro14 Dream Team. Wing Craig Gilroy was the team's leading try scorer with eleven. Lock Alan O'Connor was leading tackler with 226. John Cooney was Ulster's Player of the Year.

This was fullback Charles Piutau's last season with Ulster: he moved to Bristol Bears at the end of the season. Wings Tommy Bowe and Andrew Trimble and flanker Chris Henry retired. Centre Jared Payne also retired as a player, and was appointed defence coach.

== Staff ==
Position	Name	Nationality
Chief executive officer	Shane Logan	Ireland
Director of Rugby	Les Kiss	Australia
Operations director	Bryn Cunningham	Ireland
Head coach	Jono Gibbes	New Zealand
Assistant coach	Dwayne Peel	Wales
Scrum Coach	Aaron Dundon	New Zealand
Skills Coach	Niall Malone	Ireland
Head of Strength & Conditioning	Jonny Davis	Ireland
Strength & conditioning coach	Kevin Geary	Ireland

== Squad ==
=== Senior squad ===
==== Players In ====
- (Ireland) John Cooney from (Ireland) Connacht
- (South Africa) Jean Deysel from (South Africa) Sharks
- (Australia) Christian Lealiifano from (Australia) Brumbies
- (South Africa) Schalk van der Merwe from (South Africa) Southern Kings

==== Promoted from academy ====
- (Ireland) David Busby
- (Ireland) Aaron Cairns
- (Ireland) Ross Kane
- (Ireland) Rob Lyttle
- (Ireland) Tommy O'Hagan
- (Ireland) Jack Owens

==== Players Out ====
- (Ireland) Mark Best to (England) Jersey Reds
- (Ireland) John Donnan released
- (Ireland) Lorcan Dow released
- (Ireland) Conor Joyce to (England) Jersey Reds
- (Australia) Christian Lealiifano to (Japan) Toyota Industries Shuttles Aichi
- (Ireland) Angus Lloyd to Munster
- (Ireland) Ricky Lutton released
- (Ireland) Stephen Mulholland released
- (Ireland) Jonny Murphy to (England) Rotherham Titans
- (South Africa) Ruan Pienaar to (France) Montpellier
- (Ireland) Jonny Simpson released
- (South Africa) Franco van der Merwe to Cardiff Blues
- (Ireland) Roger Wilson retired

Ulster Rugby squad
**Props**: (South Africa) Wiehahn Herbst* (18 apps, 14 starts, 5 pts); (Ireland) Callum Black (18 apps, 13 starts); (Ireland) Andrew Warwick (20 apps, 8 starts); (Ireland) **Rodney Ah You** (18 apps, 7 starts); (Ireland) Kyle McCall (12 apps, 6 starts); (Ireland) Ross Kane (11 apps, 5 starts)); (Ireland) Tom O'Toole (4 apps, 2 starts); (South Africa) Schalk van der Merwe (2 apps, 1 start); (Ireland) Tommy O'Hagan (no apps); **Hookers**: (Ireland) **Rob Herring** (24 apps, 15 starts); (Ireland) John Andrew (17 apps, 7 starts, 15 pts); (Ireland) **Rory Best** (c) (9 apps, 6 starts, 15 pts); (Ireland) Adam McBurney (3 apps); **Locks**: (Ireland) Alan O'Connor (24 apps, 22 starts, 10 pts); (Ireland) **Kieran Treadwell** (21 aps, 17 starts, 10 pts); (Ireland) **Iain Henderson** (16 apps, 15 starts, 5 pts); (Ireland) Matthew Dalton (7 apps, 2 starts); (England) Peter Browne* (3 apps, 2 starts); (Ireland) Jack Regan (1 app)	**Back row**: (Ireland) **Sean Reidy** (22 apps, 19 starts, 20 pts); (Ireland) Nick Timoney (20 apps, 17 starts, 25 pts); (South Africa) **Jean Deysel** (11 apps, 11 starts); (Ireland) Matty Rea (18 apps, 9 starts); (Ireland) **Chris Henry** (19 apps, 8 starts); (Ireland) **Robbie Diack** (13 apps, 8 starts, 5 pts); (Ireland) Clive Ross (8 apps, 4 starts, 5 pts); (Ireland) Greg Jones (3 apps, 2 starts); (South Africa) **Marcell Coetzee** (1 app, 1 start); (Ireland) Aaron Hall (1 app, 1 start); **Scrum-halves**: (Ireland) **John Cooney** (25 apps, 22 starts, 233 pts); (Ireland) **Paul Marshall** (11 apps, 3 starts); (Ireland) David Shanahan (8 apps, 1 start, 10 pts); (Ireland) Johnny Stewart (3 apps, 1 start); (Ireland) Aaron Cairns (1 app, 1 start); **Fly-halves**: (Australia) **Christian Lealiifano** (17 apps, 17 starts, 41 pts); (Ireland) Johnny McPhillips (12 apps, 9 starts, 19 pts); (Ireland) Peter Nelson (10 apps, 3 starts, 20 pts); (Zimbabwe) Angus Curtis* (2 apps); (England) Brett Herron* (1 app, 2 pts); (Ireland) **Paddy Jackson** (suspended)	**Centres**: (Ireland) **Stuart McCloskey** (24 apps, 24 starts, 35 pts); (Ireland) **Luke Marshall** (14 app, 13 starts, 5 pts); (Ireland) **Darren Cave** (16 apps, 9 starts, 22 pts); (Ireland) **Stuart Olding** (suspended); (Ireland) **Jared Payne** (no apps); **Wings**: (South Africa) Louis Ludik* (24 apps, 19 starts, 5 pts); (Ireland) **Jacob Stockdale** (19 apps, 18 starts, 50 pts); (Ireland) **Craig Gilroy** (13 app, 13 start, 55 pts); (Ireland) **Tommy Bowe** (17 apps, 11 starts, 15 pts); (Ireland) **Andrew Trimble** (12 apps, 9 starts, 30 pts); (Ireland) Rob Lyttle (5 apps, 2 starts, 20 pts); (Ireland) Jack Owens (no apps); **Fullbacks**: (New Zealand) **Charles Piutau** (21 apps, 21 starts, 15 pts); (Ireland) David Busby (1 app)
(c) denotes the team captain, **Bold** denotes internationally capped players. Italics denotes academy players who appeared in the senior team.^{*} denotes players qualified to play for Ireland on residency or dual nationality. Players and their allocated positions from the Ulster Rugby website.

- Internationally capped players in **bold**
- Players qualified to play for Ireland on dual nationality or residency grounds*
- Irish Provinces are currently limited to four non-Irish eligible (NIE) players and one non-Irish qualified player (NIQ or "Project Player").

=== Academy squad ===
==== Players in ====
- (Ireland) Michael Lowry from (Ireland) RBAI
- (Ireland) James Hume from (Ireland) RBAI
- (Ireland) Tom O'Toole from (Ireland) Campbell College
- (Ireland) Eric O'Sullivan from (Ireland) Dublin University
- (Ireland) Robert Baloucoune from (Ireland) Portora Royal School/Enniskillen RFC
- (Ireland) Greg Jones from (Ireland) University College Dublin R.F.C.
- (Ireland) Matthew Dalton, from (Ireland) BRA
- (Ireland) Jack Regan from (Ireland) University College Dublin R.F.C.
- (Zimbabwe) Graham Curtis from (South Africa) Hilton College
- (Ireland) Alexander Clarke from (Ireland) Ballymena Academy
- (Ireland) Joe Dunleavy from (Ireland) City of Derry R.F.C.
- (Ireland) John McCusker from (Ireland) Rainey Old Boys R.F.C.

==== Players out ====
- (Ireland) Michael Lagan
- (Ireland) Craig Trenier
- (Ireland) Alex Thompson
- (Ireland) Conall Boomer
- (Ireland) Andy McGrath

Position	Name	Nationality
Head coach	Kieran Campbell	Ireland
Strength & conditioning coach	Matthew Maguire	Ireland
Strength & conditioning coach	Matthew Godfrey	Ireland
Strength & conditioning coach	Amy Davis	Ireland
Representative Team Performance Manager	Michael Black	Ireland
Talent Development Officer	Jonny Gillespie	Ireland
Elite Player Development Officer/Head Coach Ulster 'A'	Alex Codling	Ireland
Elite Player Development Officer	James Topping	Ireland
Lead Strength & Conditioning Coach	David Drake	Ireland

Ulster Rugby Academy squad
**Props**: (Ireland) Peter Cooper **(3)**; (Ireland) Eric O'Sullivan **(1)**; (Ireland) Tom O'Toole **(1)** (5 apps, 2 starts); **Hookers**: (Ireland) Alexander Clarke **(1)**; (Ireland) Adam McBurney **(2)** (3 apps); (Ireland) Zack McCall **(2)**; **Locks**: (Ireland) Matthew Dalton **(1)** (8 apps, 2 starts); (Ireland) John McCusker **(1)**; (Ireland) Jack Regan **(1)**	**Back row**: (Ireland) Joe Dunleavy **(1)**; (Ireland) Aaron Hall **(2)** (1 app, 1 start); (Ireland) Marcus Rea (2); (Ireland) Nick Timoney **(3)** (20 apps, 17 starts, 25 pts); (Ireland) Greg Jones **(1)** (4 apps, 2 starts); **Scrum-halves**: (Ireland) Johnny Stewart **(2)** (4 apps, 1 start); (Zimbabwe) Graham Curtis* **(1)**; **Fly-halves**: (Zimbabwe) Angus Curtis* **(2)** (2 apps); (Ireland) Michael Lowry **(1)**	**Centres**: (Ireland) Rory Butler **(2)**; (Ireland) James Hume **(1)**; **Wings**: (Ireland) Robert Baloucoune **(1)**; **Fullbacks**: None
(c) denotes the team captain, **Bold** denotes internationally capped players, number in brackets indicates players stage in the three-year academy cycle.^{*} denotes players qualified to play for Ireland on residency or dual nationality. Players and their allocated positions from the Ulster Rugby website.

== Season record ==
Competition	Played	Won	Drawn	Lost	PF	PA	PD	TF	TA
2017-18 Champions Cup	6	4	0	2	132	118	14	15	15
2017-18 Pro14	22	13	2	7	573	499	74	72	64
Total	28	17	2	9	705	617	88	87	79

== European Rugby Champions Cup ==
Team	P	W	D	L	PF	PA	Diff	TF	TA	TB	LB	Pts
(France) La Rochelle (5)	6	4	0	2	156	121	+35	18	17	3	1	20
(England) Wasps	6	3	0	3	154	121	+33	21	15	4	1	17
(Ireland) Ulster	6	4	0	2	132	118	+14	15	15	1	0	17
(England) Harlequins	6	1	0	5	106	188	–82	15	22	2	1	7

13 October 2017	Ulster (Ireland)	19–9	(England) Wasps	Ravenhill Stadium, Belfast
19:45	Try: Stockdale 54' m McCloskey 56' m Pen: Cooney (1/2) 14'; Lealiifano (2/2) 69', 74'	Report; Highlights	Pen: Daly (1/1) 3'; Gopperth (2/2) 40', 46'; Cards: Bassett (yellow card) 74'	Attendance: 15,291; Referee: Ben Whitehouse (WRU)
Ulster lineup: 1. Kyle McCall, 2. Rob Herring, 3. Wiehahn Herbst, 4. Kieran Treadwell, 5. Iain Henderson, 6. Robbie Diack, 7. Sean Reidy, 8. Jean Deysel, 9. John Cooney, 10. Christian Lealiifano, 11. Jacob Stockdale, 12. Stuart McCloskey, 13. Luke Marshall, 14. Louis Ludik, 15. Charles Piutau.; Replacements: 16. John Andrew, 17. Callum Black, 18. Rodney Ah You (for Herbst 64), 19. Matthew Rea, 20. Clive Ross (for Deysel 64), 21. Paul Marshall (for Cooney 64), 22. Peter Nelson, 23. Tommy Bowe (for L. Marshall 68).				Attendance: 15,291; Referee: Ben Whitehouse (WRU)

22 October 2017	(1 BP) La Rochelle (France)	41–17	(Ireland) Ulster	Stade Marcel-Deflandre, La Rochelle
16:15	Try: Sinzelle 2' c Vito 50' c Gourdon 59' c Aguillon 62' c Eaton 65' c Con: Lamb (1/1) 3'; Balès (2/2) 51', 60'; Goillot (2/2) 64', 66'; Pen: Balès (2/2) 22', 27'	Report; Highlights	Try: Lealiifano 9' c Bowe 69' c Con: Lealiifano (1/1) 10'; Pen: Lealiifano (1/1) 15'	Attendance: 16,000; Referee: Nigel Owens (WRU)
Ulster lineup: 1. Callum Black, 2. Rob Herring, 3. Wiehahn Herbst, 4. Kieran Treadwell, 5. Alan O'Connor, 6. Iain Henderson, 7. Chris Henry, 8. Sean Reidy, 9. Paul Marshall, 10. Christian Lealiifano, 11. Tommy Bowe, 12. Stuart McCloskey, 13. Darren Cave, 14. Andrew Trimble, 15. Charles Piutau.; Replacements: 16. Rory Best (for Herring 61), 17. Andrew Warwick (for Black 70), 18. Rodney Ah You (for Herbst 52), 19. Robbie Diack (for O'Connor 56), 20. Matty Rea (for Reidy 67), 21. John Cooney (for Lealiifano 47), 22. Luke Marshall (for Cave 64), 23. Jacob Stockdale (for Trimble 52).				Attendance: 16,000; Referee: Nigel Owens (WRU)

10 December 2017	Harlequins (England)	5–17	(Ireland) Ulster	Twickenham Stoop, London
13:00	Try: Sinckler 49' m	Report; Highlights	Try: Stockdale 25' m Pen: Cooney (4/5) 5', 61', 65', 78'	Attendance: 8,327; Referee: Pascal Gaüzère (FFR)
Ulster lineup: 1. Callum Black, 2. Rob Herring, 3. Wiehahn Herbst, 4. Alan O'Connor, 5. Kieran Treadwell, 6. Iain Henderson, 7. Sean Reidy, 8. Nick Timoney, 9. John Cooney, 10. Christian Lealiifano, 11. Jacob Stockdale, 12. Stuart McCloskey, 13. Tommy Bowe, 14. Craig Gilroy, 15. Charles Piutau.; Replacements: 16. John Andrew, 17. Andrew Warwick (for Black 70), 18. Rodney Ah You (for Herbst 63), 19. Matty Rea, 20. Chris Henry (for Treadwell 51), 21. Paul Marshall, 22. Peter Nelson, 23. Louis Ludik (for Bowe 47).				Attendance: 8,327; Referee: Pascal Gaüzère (FFR)

15 December 2017	(1 BP) Ulster (Ireland)	52–24	(England) Harlequins (1 BP)	Ravenhill Stadium, Belfast
19:45	Try: McCloskey 17' c Gilroy 43' c Piutau 55' m O'Connor 61' c Cooney 71' c Trimble 79' c Con: Cooney (5/6) 18', 45', 62', 72', 80'; Pen: Cooney (4/4) 4', 9', 33', 50'	Report; Highlights	Try: Smith 13' m Walker 29' c Chisholm 58' m Ward 66' c Con: Smith (2/4) 30', 67'; Cards: Sinckler (yellow card) 60'	Attendance: 15,646; Referee: Alexandre Ruiz (FFR)
Ulster lineup: 1. Callum Black, 2. Rob Herring, 3. Wiehahn Herbst, 4. Alan O'Connor, 5. Kieran Treadwell, 6. Iain Henderson, 7. Chris Henry, 8. Nick Timoney, 9. John Cooney, 10. Christian Lealiifano, 11. Jacob Stockdale, 12. Stuart McCloskey, 13. Louis Ludik, 14. Craig Gilroy, 15. Charles Piutau.; Replacements: 16. John Andrew (for Herring 34-44, 52), 17. Andrew Warwick (for Black 41), 18. Ross Kane (for Herbst 41), 19. Matty Rea (for Treadwell 68), 20. Sean Reidy (for Timoney 55), 21. Paul Marshall (for Cooney 75), 22. Peter Nelson (for Stockdale 65), 23. Andrew Trimble (for Piutau 60).				Attendance: 15,646; Referee: Alexandre Ruiz (FFR)

13 January 2018	Ulster (Ireland)	20–13	(France) La Rochelle (1 BP)	Ravenhill Stadium, Belfast
13:00	Try: Best 27' m Stockdale 34' m Timoney 44' c Con: Cooney (1/3) 45'; Pen: Cooney (1/1) 49'	Report; Highlights	Try: Balès 42' c Con: Balès (1/1) 43'; Pen: Balès (2/2) 8', 15'; Cards: Jordaan (yellow card) 22'	Attendance: 15,004; Referee: Wayne Barnes (RFU)
Ulster lineup: 1. Callum Black, 2. Rory Best, 3. Rodney Ah You, 4. Alan O'Connor, 5. Iain Henderson, 6. Matty Rea, 7. Sean Reidy, 8. Nick Timoney, 9. John Cooney, 10. Christian Lealiifano, 11. Jacob Stockdale, 12. Stuart McCloskey, 13. Louis Ludik, 14. Craig Gilroy, 15. Charles Piutau.; Replacements: 16. Rob Herring (for Best 72), 17. Kyle McCall (for Black 57), 18. Ross Kane (for Ah You 63), 19. Kieran Treadwell (for Rea 57), 20. Chris Henry (for Reidy 63), 21. David Shanahan, 22. Jonny McPhillips (for Lealiifano 72), 23. Darren Cave (for Gilroy 26).				Attendance: 15,004; Referee: Wayne Barnes (RFU)

21 January 2018	(1 BP) Wasps (England)	26–7	(Ireland) Ulster	Ricoh Arena, Coventry
15:15	Try: Thompson 10' c Cruse 31' c Le Roux 46' m Cooper-Woolley 55' c Con: Cipriani (3/4) 11', 32', 56'	ReportHighlights	Try: Reidy 23' c Con: Cooney (1/1) 24'	Attendance: 13,124; Referee: Jérôme Garcès (FFR)
Ulster lineup: 1. Kyle McCall, 2. Rory Best, 3. Rodney Ah You, 4. Alan O'Connor, 5. Kieran Treadwell, 6. Iain Henderson, 7. Sean Reidy, 8. Nick Timoney, 9. John Cooney, 10. Christian Lealiifano, 11. Jacob Stockdale, 12. Stuart McCloskey, 13. Darren Cave, 14. Louis Ludik, 15. Charles Piutau.; Replacements: 16. Rob Herring (for Best 56), 17. Andrew Warwick (for McCall 54), 18. Wiehahn Herbst (for Ah You 50), 19. Matty Rea (for Treadwell 56), 20. Chris Henry (for Timoney 65), 21. David Shanahan (for Lealiifano 72), 22. Jonny McPhillips (for Ludik 32), 23. Rob Lyttle (for Stockdale 17).				Attendance: 13,124; Referee: Jérôme Garcès (FFR)

== Pro14 ==
2017–18 Pro14 tables
Conference A
	Team	P	W	D	L	PF	PA	PD	TF	TA	TBP	LBP	PTS
1	(Scotland) Glasgow Warriors (SF)	21	15	1	5	614	366	+248	81	38	12	2	76
2	(Ireland) Munster (SF)	21	13	1	7	568	361	+207	78	42	10	5	69
3	(South Africa) Cheetahs (QF)	21	12	0	9	609	554	+55	75	68	10	5	63
4	(Wales) Cardiff Blues	21	11	0	10	502	482	+20	56	59	5	5	54
5	(Wales) Ospreys	21	9	0	12	390	487	−97	44	60	5	3	44
6	(Ireland) Connacht	21	7	0	14	445	477	−32	53	54	5	6	39
7	(Italy) Zebre	21	7	0	14	408	593	–185	50	78	4	4	36
Conference B
	Team	P	W	D	L	PF	PA	PD	TF	TA	TBP	LBP	PTS
1	(Ireland) Leinster (CH)	21	14	1	6	601	374	+227	83	46	10	2	70
2	(Wales) Scarlets (RU)	21	14	1	6	528	365	+163	69	43	9	3	70
3	(Scotland) Edinburgh (QF)	21	15	0	6	494	375	+119	62	44	7	1	68
4	(Ireland) Ulster (PO)	21	12	2	7	538	482	+56	68	61	8	2	62
5	(Italy) Benetton	21	11	0	10	415	451	−36	51	55	6	5	55
6	(Wales) Dragons	21	2	2	17	378	672	−294	43	94	4	4	20
7	(South Africa) Southern Kings	21	1	0	20	378	829	−451	48	119	4	3	11
If teams are level at any stage, tiebreakers are applied in the following order -: 1. number of matches won 2. the difference between points for and points against 3. the number of tries scored 4. the most points scored 5. the difference between tries for and tries against 6. the fewest red cards received 7. the fewest yellow cards received
Green background indicates teams that competed in the Pro14 play-offs, and also earned a place in the 2018–19 European Champions Cup (excluding South African teams who are ineligible); Blue background indicates teams outside the play-off places that earned a place in the 2018–19 European Champions Cup, including the winner of the play-off between the two fourth-ranked European teams in each conference Yellow background indicates the loser of the play-off between the two fourth-ranked European teams in each conference, that earned a place in the 2018–19 European Rugby Challenge Cup. Plain background indicates teams that earned a place in the 2018–19 European Rugby Challenge Cup. (CH) Champions. (RU) Runners-up. (SF) Losing semi-finalists. (QF) Losing quarter-finalists. (PO) Champions Cup play-off winners.

1 September 2017	(1 BP) Ulster (Ireland)	42–19	(South Africa) Cheetahs	Ravenhill Stadium, Belfast
19:35	Try: Bowe 18' m O'Connor 26' c McCloskey 29' c Piutau 32' m Ludik 41' m Nelson 74' c Con: Cooney (2/5) 27', 30'; Nelson (1/1) 75'; Pen: Cooney (2/2) 8', 55'	Report; Match centre Highlights	Try: Blommetjies 15' c Mapimpi 20' c Petersen 49' m Con: Small-Smith (2/3) 17', 22'; Cards: Coetzee (yellow card); Venter (yellow card)	Attendance: 14,448; Referee: Andrew Brace (IRFU)
Ulster lineup: 1. Kyle McCall, 2. Rob Herring, 3. Wiehahn Herbst, 4. Robbie Diack, 5. Alan O'Connor, 6. Jean Deysel, 7. Chris Henry, 8. Marcell Coetzee, 9. John Cooney, 10. Christian Lealiifano, 11. Louis Ludik, 12. Stuart McCloskey, 13. Tommy Bowe, 14. Andrew Trimble, 15. Charles Piutau.; Replacements: 16. John Andrew (for Herring 68'), 17. Callum Black (for McCall 68'), 18. Rodney Ah You (for Herbst 60'), 19. Matthew Rea (for O'Connor 60'), 20. Sean Reidy (for Coetzee 51'), 21. David Shanahan (for Cooney 75'), 22. Peter Nelson (for Lealiifano 51'), 23. Darren Cave (for Piutau 68').				Attendance: 14,448; Referee: Andrew Brace (IRFU)

9 September 2017	(1 BP) Benetton (Italy)	14–21	(Ireland) Ulster	Stadio Comunale di Monigo, Treviso
18:05	Try: Ruzza 64' c, McKinley 70' c Con: McKinley (2/2) 65', 72'	Report; Match centre Highlights	Try: Trimble (2) 8' c, 23' c Stockdale 60' c Con: Cooney (3/3) 9', 24', 61'	Attendance: 2,600; Referee: Dan Jones (WRU)
Ulster lineup: 1. Callum Black, 2. Rob Herring, 3. Wiehahn Herbst, 4. Robbie Diack, 5. Kieran Treadwell, 6. Matthew Rea, 7. Sean Reidy, 8. Jean Deysel, 9. John Cooney, 10. Christian Lealiifano, 11. Jacob Stockdale, 12. Stuart McCloskey, 13. Tommy Bowe, 14. Andrew Trimble, 15. Louis Ludik.; Replacements: 16. John Andrew (for Herring 61'), 17. Andrew Warwick (for Black 50'), 18. Rodney Ah You (for Herbst 61'), 19. Pete Browne (for Treadwell 73'), 20. Chris Henry (for Deysel 49'), 21. David Shanahan (for Cooney 65'), 22. Peter Nelson (for Lealiifano 61'), 23. Luke Marshall (for Trimble 49').				Attendance: 2,600; Referee: Dan Jones (WRU)

15 September 2017	Ulster (Ireland)	27–20	(Wales) Scarlets (1 BP)	Ravenhill Stadium, Belfast
19:35	Try: Stockdale 63' m Andrew 75' c Con: Lealiifano (1/1) 77'; Pen: Cooney (4/4) 18', 31', 33', 51'; Lealiifano (1/1) 71'	Report; Match centre Highlights	Try: McNicholl 60' c J. Davies 67' c Con: Halfpenny (2/2) 62', 68'; Pen: Halfpenny (2/2) 3', 57'	Attendance: 12,712; Referee: Marius Mitrea (FIR)
Ulster lineup: 1. Kyle McCall, 2. Rob Herring, 3. Wiehahn Herbst, 4. Kieran Treadwell, 5. Alan O'Connor, 6. Matthew Rea, 7. Chris Henry, 8. Sean Reidy, 9. John Cooney, 10. Christian Lealiifano, 11. Jacob Stockdale, 12. Stuart McCloskey, 13. Luke Marshall, 14. Andrew Trimble, 15. Louis Ludik.; Replacements: 16. John Andrew (for Herring 57'), 17. Andrew Warwick, 18. Rodney Ah You (for Herbst 66'), 19. Robbie Diack (for Treadwell 58'), 20. Clive Ross (for Henry 66'), 21. Paul Marshall (for Cooney 70'), 22. Peter Nelson (for Stockdale 72'), 23. Tommy Bowe (for Ludik 51').				Attendance: 12,712; Referee: Marius Mitrea (FIR)

22 September 2017	(1 BP) Ulster (Ireland)	52–25	(Wales) Dragons	Ravenhill Stadium, Belfast
19:35	Try: McCloskey 2' m Nelson 11' c Penalty try 19'; Timoney (2) 24' c, 48' c Herbst 28' c Stockdale 43' m Shanahan 62' c Con: Nelson (4/6) 12', 25', 29', 49'; Herron (1/1) 63'; Cards: Ah You (yellow card)	Report; Match centre Highlights	Try: Buckley 34' c Blacker 56' c Talbot-Davies 79' m Con: Jones (1/1) 34'; O'Brien (1/2) 57'; Pen: Jones (2/2) 6', 15'; Cards: Fairbrother (yellow card)	Attendance: 12,291; Referee: Dan Jones (WRU)
Ulster lineup: 1. Kyle McCall, 2. Rob Herring, 3. Rodney Ah You, 4. Robbie Diack, 5. Alan O'Connor, 6. Clive Ross, 7. Chris Henry, 8. Nick Timoney, 9. Paul Marshall, 10. Peter Nelson, 11. Jacob Stockdale, 12. Stuart McCloskey, 13. Darren Cave, 14. Tommy Bowe, 15. Charles Piutau.; Replacements: 16. John Andrew (for Herring 49'), 17. Andrew Warwick (for McCall 41'), 18. Wiehahn Herbst, 19. Iain Henderson (for O'Connor 58'), 20. Matty Rea (for Ross 52'), 21. David Shanahan (for Marshall), 22. Brett Herron (for Cave 52'), 23. Rob Lyttle (for Piutau 49').				Attendance: 12,291; Referee: Dan Jones (WRU)

30 September 2017	Zebre (Italy)	27–23	(Ireland) Ulster (1 BP)	Stadio Sergio Lanfranchi, Parma
15:35	Try: Licata 47' c Bellini 52' c Giammarioli 71' c Con: Canna (1/1) 49'; Violi (2/2) 53', 73'; Pen: Canna (2/4) 3', 21'	Report; Match centre Highlights	Try: Trimble 16' c Cave 78' c Con: Cooney (1/1) 18'; Cave (1/1) 78' c Pen: Cooney (3/3) 32', 39', 62'	Attendance: 3,100; Referee: Mike Adamson (SRU)
Ulster lineup: 1. Callum Black, 2. John Andrew, 3. Rodney Ah You, 4. Pete Browne, 5. Iain Henderson, 6. Matty Rea, 7. Sean Reidy, 8. Jean Deysel, 9. John Cooney, 10. Christian Lealiifano, 11. Louis Ludik, 12. Luke Marshall, 13. Darren Cave, 14. Andrew Trimble, 15. Charles Piutau.; Replacements: 16. Adam McBurney (for Andrew 77'), 17. Andrew Warwick (for Black 49'), 18. Wiehahn Herbst (for Ah You 49'), 19. Kieran Treadwell (for Browne 27'), 20. Nick Timoney (for Deysel 54'), 21. David Shanahan (for Cooney 63'), 22. Peter Nelson, 23. Rob Lyttle.				Attendance: 3,100; Referee: Mike Adamson (SRU)

6 October 2017	Ulster (Ireland)	16–8	(Ireland) Connacht	Ravenhill Stadium, Belfast
19:35	Try: Stockdale 56' c Con: Cooney (1/1) 56'; Pen: Cooney (3/3) 28', 44', 53'; Cards: Deysel (yellow card)	Report; Match centre Highlights	Try: McCartney 35' m Pen: J. Carty (1/1) 49'	Attendance: 14,363; Referee: Andrew Brace (IRFU)
Ulster lineup: 1. Callum Black, 2. Rob Herring, 3. Wiehahn Herbst, 4. Alan O'Connor, 5. Kieran Treadwell, 6. Iain Henderson, 7. Chris Henry, 8. Jean Deysel, 9. John Cooney, 10. Christian Lealiifano, 11. Stuart McCloskey, 12. Jacob Stockdale, 13. Luke Marshall, 14. Tommy Bowe, 15. Charles Piutau.; Replacements: 16. John Andrew (for Herring 75'), 17. Andrew Warwick, 18. Rodney Ah You (for Herbst 67'), 19. Robbie Diack (for O'Connor 50'), 20. Sean Reidy (for Henry 54'), 21. Paul Marshall, 22. Peter Nelson, 23. Louis Ludik (for Bowe 59').				Attendance: 14,363; Referee: Andrew Brace (IRFU)

28 October 2017	Ulster (Ireland)	10–25	(Ireland) Leinster	Ravenhill Stadium, Belfast
18:30	Try: Reidy 27' c Con: Lealiifano (1/1) 28'; Pen: Lealiifano (1/1) 6'	Report; Match centre Highlights	Try: Larmour 15' c L. McGrath (2) 58' m, 78' c Con: R. Byrne (1/2) 15'; Marsh (1/1) 78'; Pen: R. Byrne (2/3) 30', 37'; Cards: Kearney (yellow card)	Attendance: 17,631; Referee: John Lacey (IRFU)
Ulster lineup: 1. Callum Black, 2. Rory Best, 3. Rodney Ah You, 4. Alan O'Connor, 5. Iain Henderson, 6. Sean Reidy, 7. Chris Henry, 8. Jean Deysel, 9. Aaron Cairns, 10. Christian Lealiifano, 11. Jacob Stockdale, 12. Stuart McCloskey, 13. Luke Marshall, 14. Tommy Bowe, 15. Charles Piutau.; Replacements: 16. Rob Herring (for Best 56'), 17. Andrew Warwick (for Black 56'), 18. Ross Kane (for Ah You 74'), 19. Kieran Treadwell (for O'Connor 62'), 20. Robbie Diack (for Deysel 16'), 21. Johnny Stewart (for Cairns 61'), 22. Peter Nelson (for Lealiifano 67'), 23. Louis Ludik (for McCloskey 70').				Attendance: 17,631; Referee: John Lacey (IRFU)

4 November 2017	(2 BP) Southern Kings (South Africa)	36–43	(Ireland) Ulster (1 BP)	Isaac Wolfson Stadium, KwaZakele
15:00	Try: B. Klaasen (2) 3' m, 62' c Penxe (2) 6' c, 73' c Makase 28' c Con: Zono (3/4) 7', 29', 63'; Coleman (1/1) 74'; Pen: Zono (1/1) 23'; Cards: Penxe (yellow card)	Report; Match centre Highlights	Try: Reidy 18' m Andrew (2) 26' m, 49' m Cooney 53' c Trimble 68' c Ross 72' c Diack 75' c Con: Cooney (1/4) 54'; Lealiifano (3/3) 69', 72', 76'	Attendance: 2,836; Referee: Quinton Immelman (SARU)
Ulster lineup: 1. Andrew Warwick, 2. John Andrew, 3. Wiehahn Herbst, 4. Kieran Treadwell, 5. Alan O'Connor, 6. Matty Rea, 7. Chris Henry, 8. Sean Reidy, 9. John Cooney, 10. Christian Lealiifano, 11. Andrew Trimble, 12. Darren Cave, 13. Louis Ludik, 14. Craig Gilroy, 15. Charles Piutau.; Replacements: 16. Adam McBurney (for Andrew 72'), 17. Callum Black (for Warwick 60'), 18. Ross Kane (for Herbst 36'), 19. Robbie Diack (for Rea 64'), 20. Clive Ross (for Hery 55'), 21. Johnny Stewart, 22. Peter Nelson, 23. Tommy Bowe.				Attendance: 2,836; Referee: Quinton Immelman (SARU)

24 November 2017	Ulster (Ireland)	23–22	(Italy) Benetton (1 BP)	Ravenhill Stadium, Belfast
19:05	Try: Bowe 17' c Trimble 77' c Con: Cooney (1/1) 18'; Lealiifano (1/1) 78'; Pen: Cooney (2/3) 22', 31'; Lealiifano (1/1) 63'	Report; Match centre Highlights	Try: Barbieri 55' c Con: Allan (1/1) 57'; Pen: Allan (4/5) 4', 12', 38', 51'; Banks (1/1) 72'; Cards: Bronzini (yellow card)	Attendance: 14,544; Referee: Mike Adamson (SRU)
Ulster lineup: 1. Callum Black, 2. John Andrew, 3. Ross Kane, 4. Kieran Treadwell, 5. Alan O'Connor, 6. Clive Ross, 7. Aaron Hall, 8. Nick Timoney, 9. John Cooney, 10. Peter Nelson, 11. Craig Gilroy, 12. Christian Lealiifano, 13. Louis Ludik, 14. Tommy Bowe, 15. Charles Piutau.; Replacements: 16. Rob Herring (for Andrew 52'), 17. Schalk van der Merwe (for Black 45'), 18. Andrew Warwick (for Kane 52'), 19. Matthew Dalton (for Hall 70'), 20. Greg Jones (for Ross 34'), 21. Paul Marshall (for Cooney 53'), 22. Darren Cave (for Nelson 53'), 23. Andrew Trimble (for Bowe 74'.				Attendance: 14,544; Referee: Mike Adamson (SRU)

1 December 2017	(1 BP) Dragons (Wales)	32–32	(Ireland) Ulster (1 BP)	Rodney Parade, Newport
19:35	Try: Screech 19' c Hewitt (2) 27' m, 77' m Belcher 66' m O'Brien 71' c Con: Henson (2/5) 20', 72'; Pen: Henson (1/1) 24'; Cards: Jack Dixon (yellow card)	Report; Match centre Highights	Try: Gilroy (2) 9' m, 54' c Penalty try 32'; L. Marshall 41' m Lealiifano 80' m Con: Lealiifano (1/4) 56'; Pen: Lealiifano (1/1) 4'	Attendance: 4,477; Referee: Marius Mitrea (FIR)
Ulster lineup: 1. Schalk van der Merwe, 2. John Andrew, 3. Ross Kane, 4. Alan O'Connor, 5. Kieran Treadwell, 6. Greg Jones, 7. Sean Reidy, 8. Nick Timoney, 9. Paul Marshall, 10. Christian Lealiifano, 11. Louis Ludik, 12. Stuart McCloskey, 13. Tommy Bowe, 14. Craig Gilroy, 15. Charles Piutau.; Replacements: 16. Rory Best (for Andrew 52'), 17. Callum Black (for Van der Mwerwe 52'), 18. Andrew Warwick (for Kane 52'), 19. Matthew Dalton (for Treadwell 73'), 20. Chris Henry (for Jones 57'), 21. John Cooney (for P Marshall 53'), 22. Peter Nelson, 23. Andrew Trimble (for Ludik 76').				Attendance: 4,477; Referee: Marius Mitrea (FIR)

23 December 2017	(1 BP) Connacht (Ireland)	44–16	(Ireland) Ulster	The Sportsground, Galway
19:35	Try: E. Masterson 2' m Aki 7' c O'Halloran 24' m Dillane (2) 54' c, 75' c Butler 59' c Con: J. Carty (4/6) 8', 56', 61', 76'; Pen: J. Carty (2/2) 40', 47'; Cards: O'Halloran (yellow card)	Report; Match centre Highlights	Try: Gilroy 65' m Lyttle 79' m Pen: Cooney (2/2) 23', 32'; Cards: Ludik (yellow card); Warwick (yellow card)	Attendance: 7,629; Referee: Mike Adamson (SRU)
Ulster lineup: 1. Andrew Warwick, 2. John Andrew, 3. Wiehahn Herbst, 4. Matthew Dalton, 5. Robbie Diack, 6. Iain Henderson, 7. Sean Reidy, 8. Nick Timoney, 9. John Cooney, 10. Peter Nelson, 11. Andrew Trimble, 12. Darren Cave, 13. Louis Ludik, 14. Craig Gilroy, 15. Jacob Stockdale.; Replacements: 16. Adam McBurney (for Andrew 48'), 17. Schalk van der Merwe, 18. Ross Kane (for Herbst 52'), 19. Matty Rea (for Diack 65'), 20. Clive Ross, 21. Paul Marshall (for Nelson 53'), 22. Johnny McPhillips, 23. Rob Lyttle (for Cooney 62').				Attendance: 7,629; Referee: Mike Adamson (SRU)

1 January 2018	(1 BP) Ulster (Ireland)	24–17	(Ireland) Munster (1 BP)	Ravenhill Stadium, Belfast
17:35	Try: Cave 57' c Gilroy (2) 61' m, 73' c Lyttle 79' m Con: Cooney (2/4) 58', 74'	Report; Match centre Highlights	Try: N. Scannell (2) 13' m, 24' m Penalty try 33'; Cards: Arnold (red card); Wycherley (yellow card)	Attendance: 17,594; Referee: Sean Gallagher (IRFU)
Ulster lineup: 1. Kyle McCall, 2. Rob Herring, 3. Rodney Ah You, 4. Alan O'Connor, 5. Kieran Treadwell, 6. Greg Jones, 7. Nick Timoney, 8. Jean Deysel, 9. John Cooney, 10. Christian Lealiifano, 11. Rob Lyttle, 12. Stuart McCloskey, 13. Darren Cave, 14. Craig Gilroy, 15. Charles Piutau.; Replacements: 16. Adam McBurney, 17. Callum Black (for McCall, 40'), 18. Wiehahn Herbst (for Ah You 40'), 19. Robbie Diack (for Treadwell 75'), 20. Matty Rea (for Deysel 45'), 21. Paul Marshall, 22. Johnny McPhillips, 23. Andrew Trimble.				Attendance: 17,594; Referee: Sean Gallagher (IRFU)

6 January 2018	(1 BP) Leinster (Ireland)	38–7	(Ireland) Ulster	RDS Arena, Dublin
17:35	Try: Larmour (2) 5' c, 66' m B. Daly 15' m McFadden (2) 47' c, 51' c Sexton 81' c Con: R. Byrne (3/4) 6', 48', 53'; Sexton (1/2) 82'	Report; Match centre Highlights	Try: Stockdale 72' c Con: Cooney (1/1) 74'	Attendance: 17,373; Referee: George Clancy (IRFU)
Ulster lineup: 1. Callum Black, 2. Rory Best, 3. Rodney Ah You, 4. Pete Browne, 5. Iain Henderson, 6. Matty Rea, 7. Sean Reidy, 8. Jean Deysel, 9. Johnny Stewart, 10. Christian Lealiifano, 11. Jacob Stockdale, 12. Stuart McCloskey, 13. Darren Cave, 14. Andrew Trimble, 15. Charles Piutau.; Replacements: 16. Rob Herring (for Best 64'), 17. Kyle McCall (for Black 61'), 18. Wiehahn Herbst (for Ah You 47-73'), 19. Alan O'Connor (for Browne 52'), 20. Nick Timoney (For Reidy 56'), 21. John Cooney (for J Stewart 52'), 22. Johnny McPhillips (for Lealiifano 55'), 23. Tommy Bowe (for Piutau 55-73').				Attendance: 17,373; Referee: George Clancy (IRFU)

9 February 2018	(1 BP) Ulster (Ireland)	59–10	(South Africa) Southern Kings	Ravenhill Stadium, Belfast
19:35	Try: Gilroy (3) 6' c, 38' c, 54' m McCloskey 17' c McPhillips 42' c Lyttle (2) 49' c, 58' m Treadwell 73' c Cave 76' c Con: Cooney (7/9) 7', 18', 39', 43', 50', 74', 77'	Report; Match centre Highlights	Try: H. Klaasen 70' c Con: Van Rensburg (1/1) 70'	Attendance: 13,759; Referee: Joy Neville (IRFU)
Ulster lineup: 1. Andrew Warwick, 2. John Andrew, 3. Wiehahn Herbst, 4. Alan O'Connor, 5. Kieran Treadwell, 6. Matty Rea, 7. Sean Reidy, 8. Nick Timoney, 9. John Cooney, 10. Johnny McPhillips, 11. Rob Lyttle, 12. Stuart McCloskey, 13. Luke Marshall, 14. Craig Gilroy, 15. Charles Piutau.; Replacements: 16. Rob Herring (for Andrew 55'), 17. Kyle McCall (for Warwick 55'), 18. Rodney Ah You (for Herbst 55'), 19. Matthew Dalton (for Lyttle 59'), 20. Chris Henry (for Reidy 34'), 21. Johnny Stewart (for McPhillips 55'), 22. Darren Cave (for McCloskey 55'), 23. Louis Ludik (for Piutau 20').				Attendance: 13,759; Referee: Joy Neville (IRFU)

16 February 2018	(1 BP) Ulster (Ireland)	16–17	(Scotland) Edinburgh	Ravenhill Stadium, Belfast
19:35	Try: Cooney 8' c Con: Cooney (1/1) 9'; Pen: Cooney (3/3) 42', 55', 66'	Report; Match centre Highlights	Try: Harries 33' c Carmichael 62' c Con: Hidalgo-Clyne (2/2) 35', 63'; Drop: Weir (1/1) 80'	Attendance: 14,497; Referee: Nigel Owens (WRU)
Ulster lineup: 1. Andrew Warwick, 2. Rob Herring, 3. Wiehahn Herbst, 4. Alan O'Connor, 5. Kieran Treadwell, 6. Matty Rea, 7. Nick Timoney, 8. Sean Deysel, 9. John Cooney, 10. Johnny McPhillips, 11. Tommy Bowe, 12. Stuart McCloskey, 13. Luke Marshall, 14. Craig Gilroy, 15. Louis Ludik.; Replacements: 16. Rob Andrew (for Herring 55'), 17. Kyle McCall (for Warwick 53'), 18. Rodney Ah You (for Herbst 53'), 19. Matthew Dalton (for Treadwell 67'), 20. Chris Henry (for Deysel 56'), 21. Johnny Stewart, 22. Darren Cave, 23. David Busby.				Attendance: 14,497; Referee: Nigel Owens (WRU)

24 February 2018	(1 BP) Scarlets (Wales)	34–10	(Ireland) Ulster	Parc y Scarlets, Llanelli
19:35	Try: Nicholas 43' c Conbeer 57' c Asquith 64' c Beirne 76' c Con: Jones (4/4) 44', 58', 65', 76'; Pen: Jones (2/2) 9', 55'	Report; Match centre Highlights	Try: McCloskey 2' c Con: Cooney (1/1) 3'; Pen: Cooney (1/1) 50'	Attendance: 6,941; Referee: Ian Davies (WRU)
Ulster lineup: 1. Andrew Warwick, 2. John Andrew, 3. Wiehahn Herbst, 4. Alan O'Connor, 5. Kieran Treadwell, 6. Matty Rea, 7. Nick Timoney, 8. Sean Deysel, 9. John Cooney, 10. Johnny McPhillips, 11. Tommy Bowe, 12. Stuart McCloskey, 13. Luke Marshall, 14. Andrew Trimble, 15. Louis Ludik.; Replacements: 16. Rob Herring (for Andrew 51'), 17. Kyle McCall (for Warwick 51'), 18. Rodney Ah You (for Herbst 62'), 19. Matthew Dalton, 20. Chris Henry (for Deysel 45'), 21. Paul Marshall (for Cooney 73'), 22. Peter Nelson (for Trimble 65'), 23. Darren Cave (for Marshall 67').				Attendance: 6,941; Referee: Ian Davies (WRU)

24 March 2018	(1 BP) Cardiff Blues (Wales)	35–17	(Ireland) Ulster	Cardiff Arms Park
15:15	Try: Evans 1' c Scully 12' c Dacey 56' m D. Lewis 80' c Con: Evans (4/5) 2', 13', 62', 80'; Pen: Evans (2/2) 40', 70'	Report; Match centre Highlights	Try: Shanahan 78' m Pen: Cooney (4/5) 5', 38', 45', 52'; Cards: Herbst (yellow card)	Attendance: 5,763; Referee: Mike Adamson (SRU)
Ulster lineup: 1. Andrew Warwick, 2. Rob Herring, 3. Wiehahn Herbst, 4. Alan O'Connor, 5. Kieran Treadwell, 6. Iain Henderson, 7. Clive Ross, 8. Nick Timoney, 9. John Cooney, 10. Johnny McPhillips, 11. Jacob Stockdale, 12. Stuart McCloskey, 13. Luke Marshall, 14. Craig Gilroy, 15. Charles Piutau.; Replacements: 16. John Andrew (for Herring 61') 17. Callum Black (for Warwick 71'), 18. Ross Kane (for Herbst 31'), 19. Matthew Dalton (for Treadwell 66'), 20. Matty Rea, 21. David Shanahan (for Cooney 74'), 22. Peter Nelson (for McCloskey 74'), 23. Louis Ludik (for Marshall 62').				Attendance: 5,763; Referee: Mike Adamson (SRU)

6 April 2018	Edinburgh (Scotland)	20–32	(Ireland) Ulster (1 BP)	Murrayfield Stadium, Edinburgh
19:35	Try: Weir 30' c Penalty try 57'; Con: Weir (1/1) 31'; Pen: Weir (2/2) 9', 15'	Report; Match centre Highlights	Try: Cave 12' c Piutau 19' m Cooney 23' c Henderson 78' c Con: Cooney (3/4) 13', 25', 79'; Pen: Cooney (2/2) 50', 64'	Attendance: 4,989; Referee: Nigel Owens (WRU)
Ulster lineup: 1. Andrew Warwick, 2. Rory Best, 3. Tom O'Toole, 4. Matthew Dalton, 5. Iain Henderson, 6. Matty Rea, 7. Nick Timoney, 8. Jean Deysel, 9. John Cooney, 10. Johnny McPhillips, 11. Jacob Stockdale, 12. Stuart McCloskey, 13. Darren Cave, 14. Louis Ludik, 15. Charles Piutau.; Replacements: 16. Rob Herring (for Best 74), 17. Tommy O'Hagan', 18. Rodney Ah You (for O'Toole 60'), 19. Alan O'Connor (for Dalton 46'), 20. Sean Reidy (for Reidy 72'), 21. David Shanahan, 22. Angus Curtis, 23. Tommy Bowe (for Ludik 38'.				Attendance: 4,989; Referee: Nigel Owens (WRU)

13 April 2018	Ulster (Ireland)	8–0	(Wales) Ospreys	Ravenhill Stadium, Belfast
19:35	Try: Stockdale 79' m Pen: Cooney (1/1) 6'	Report; Match centre	Cards: Hassler (yellow card)	Attendance: 13,267; Referee: Andrew Brace (IRFU)
Ulster lineup: 1. Callum Black, 2. Rob Herring, 3. Ross Kane, 4. Alan O'Connor, 5. Kieran Treadwell, 6. Robbie Diack, 7. Sean Reidy, 8. Nick Timoney, 9. John Cooney, 10. Johnny McPhillips, 11. Jacob Stockdale, 12. Stuart McCloskey, 13. Luke Marshall, 14. Louis Ludik, 15. Charles Piutau.; Replacements: 16. John Andrew (for Timoney 73'), 17. Andrew Warwick, 18. Tom O'Toole, 19. Jack Regan (for Cooney 76'), 20. Chris Henry (for Diack 63'), 21. David Shanahan, 22. Darren Cave (for L Marshall 57'), 23. Craig Gilroy.				Attendance: 13,267; Referee: Andrew Brace (IRFU)

21 April 2018	(1 BP) Ulster (Ireland)	36–15	(Scotland) Glasgow Warriors	Ravenhill Stadium, Belfast
18:05	Try: Cooney 11' c Timoney (2) 54' c, 82' m Reidy 60' m Con: Cooney (1/1) 12'; McPhillips (1/2) 56'; Pen: Cooney (3/3) 4', 39', 40'; McPhillips (1/1) 68'	Report; Match centre Highlights	Try: Gibbins (2) 21' c, 46' m Con: Russell (1/2) 21'; Pen: Russell (1/1) 18'	Attendance: 16,186; Referee: Stuart Berry (SARU)
Ulster lineup: 1. Andrew Warwick, 2. Rob Herring, 3. Ross Kane, 4. Alan O'Connor, 5. Iain Henderson, 6. Nick Timoney, 7. Sean Reidy, 8. Jean Deysel, 9. John Cooney, 10. Johnny McPhillips, 11. Jacob Stockdale, 12. Stuart McCloskey, 13. Luke Marshall, 14. Louis Ludik, 15. Charles Piutau.; Replacements: 16. Rory Best (for Herring 61'), 17. Kyle McCall (for Warwick 54'), 18. Tom O'Toole (for Kane 61'), 19. Kieran Treadwell, 20. Clive Ross (for Deysel 16'), 21. Paul Marshall (for Cooney 40'), 22. Angus Curtis (for McPhillips 72'), 23. Tommy Bowe (for L Marshall 69').				Attendance: 16,186; Referee: Stuart Berry (SARU)

28 April 2018	Munster (Ireland)	24–24	(Ireland) Ulster	Thomond Park, Limerick
17:35	Try: Williams 1' c Scott 26' c Copeland 48' c Con: Hanrahan (3/3) 2', 28', 49'; Pen: Hanrahan (1/1) 67'; Cards: Copeland (yellow card)	Report; Match centre Highlights	Try: McCloskey 4' c Best (2) 32' c, 40' c Con: McPhillips (3/3) 5', 34', 40'; Pen: McPhillips (1/1) 15'; Cards: L. Marshall (yellow card)	Attendance: 16,178; Referee: Ben Whitehouse (WRU)
Ulster lineup: 1. Callum Black, 2. Rory Best, 3. Ross Kane, 4. Alan O'Connor, 5. Iain Henderson, 6. Clive Ross, 7. Sean Reidy, 8. Nick Timoeny, 9. David Shanahan, 10. Johnny McPhillips, 11. Jacob Stockdale, 12. Stuart McCloskey, 13. Luke Marshall, 14. Craig Gilroy, 15. Louis Ludik.; Replacements: 16. Rob Herring (for Best 69'), 17. Andrew Warwick (for Black 55'), 18. Tom O'Toole (for Kane 64'), 19. Kieran Treadwell (for Henderson 22'), 20. Chris Henry (for Timoney 72'), 21. Paul Marshall (for Shanahan 45'), 22. Angus Curtis (for McCloskey 30'), 23. Tommy Bowe (for Gilroy 69').				Attendance: 16,178; Referee: Ben Whitehouse (WRU)

=== Play-off for the 7th Champions Cup place ===
The South African teams cannot compete in the European Rugby Champions Cup. The top three eligible teams in each conference automatically qualify for following year's Champions Cup. The fourth ranked eligible team in each conference meet in a play-off match with the winner taking the seventh Champions Cup place.

Ulster had home advantage against Ospreys by virtue of finishing with the greater number of points accumulated during the PRO14 regular league (62, as opposed to Ospreys’ 44). The match was played on Sunday 20 May, at the Kingspan Stadium.

20 May 2018	Ulster (Ireland)	35–17	(Wales) Ospreys	Ravenhill Stadium, Belfast
15:05	Try: Gilroy (2) 34' m, 41' c Treadwell 52' c Stockdale 72' c Con: Cooney (3/4) 42', 53', 73'; Pen: Cooney (3/3) 26', 64', 70'	Report; Highlights	Try: A. W. Jones 15' c Dirksen 61' m Biggar 77' m Con: Biggar (1/3) 16'	Attendance: 7,014; Referee: Marius Mitrea (FIR)
Ulster lineup: 1. Callum Black, 2. Rob Herring, 3. Tom O'Toole, 4. Alan O'Connor, 5. Kieran Treadwell, 6. Robbie Diack, 7. Sean Reidy, 8. Nick Timoney, 9. John Cooney, 10. Johnny McPhillips, 11. Jacob Stockdale, 12. Stuart McCloskey, 13. Luke Marshall, 14. Craig Gilroy, 15. Louis Ludik.; Replacements: 16. John Andrew (for Timoney 76'), 17. Andrew Warwick (for Black 23'), 18. Rodney Ah You, 19. Jack Regan, 20. Chris Henry (for Diack 62'), 21. David Shanahan (for Cooney 75'), 22. Darren Cave (for L Marshall 56'), 23. David Busby (for Ludik 18').				Attendance: 7,014; Referee: Marius Mitrea (FIR)

=== End of season awards ===
John Cooney was the competition's top scorer with 175 points, and was named at scrum-half on the Pro14 Dream Team.

== Home attendance ==
Domestic League					European Cup					Total	
League	Fixtures	Average Attendance	Highest	Lowest	League	Fixtures	Average Attendance	Highest	Lowest	Total Attendance	Average Attendance
2017–18 Pro14	12*	14,026	17,631	7,014	2017–18 European Rugby Champions Cup	3	15,314	15,646	15,004	214,247	14,283

== Friendlies ==
1 June 2017	Ulster (Ireland)	28–43	Barbarians	Ravenhill Stadium, Belfast
19:30 IST (UTC+01)	Try: McCloskey 5' c Keane 10' c Patterson 34' c O'Connor 42' c Con: Wilson (1/1) 6'; Pienaar (2/2) 11', 35'; Herron (1/1) 43'	Report	Try: Flynn 19' m Nayacalevu (2) 23' c, 60' c King (2) 31' m, 39' m Penalty try 54' c Tekori 77' c Con: Agulla (1/3) 24'; Madigan (2/3) 54', 60'; Dusautoir (1/1) 78'	Attendance: 15,500; Referee: Ben Whitehouse (Wales)

17 August 2017	Ulster (Ireland)	15–26	Wasps	Ravenhill Stadium, Belfast
	Try: Browne; Patterson; Con: Nelson; Pen: Herron	Report	Try: Hampson; McIntyre; Bassett; Cipriani; Con: Cipriani (3)

== Ulster Women ==
=== 2017-18 Women's Interprovincial Series ===
	Team	P	W	D	L	PF	PA	BP	Pts
1	Munster	3	2	0	1	58	29	1	9
2	Leinster	3	2	0	1	56	29	1	9
3	Connacht	3	2	0	1	56	39	0	8
4	Ulster	3	0	0	3	22	95	0	0

2 December 2017	Ulster	10-34	Leinster	Barban Hill, Dromore

9 December 2017	Munster	32-5	Ulster	Dooradoyle, Limerick

16 December 2017	Ulster	7-29	Connacht	Deramore Park, Belfast

== Ulster Rugby Awards ==
The Heineken Ulster Rugby Awards ceremony was held at the La Mon Hotel and Country Club, Castlereagh, on 10 May 2018. Winners were:

- Ulster Player of the Year: John Cooney (nominees: Nick Timoney, Stuart McCloskey)
- Ulster Rugby Personality of the Year: Paul Marshall
- Young Player of the Year: Nick Timoney (nominees: Matty Rea, Johnny McPhillips)
- Rugby Writers Player of the Year: John Cooney (nominees: Jacob Stockdale, Nick Timoney)
- Ulster Rugby Supporters Club Player of the Year: John Cooney (nominees: Rory Best, Jacob Stockdale)
- Academy Player of the Year: Nick Timoney (nominees: Tom O'Toole, Angus Curtis)
- Ulster A Player of the Year: Tom O'Toole (nominees: Clive Ross, Matthew Agnew)
- Community Rugby Champions: Patrick Baird, Malone RFC; Noel Brown, Cooke RFC (nominees: Clem Bassett, Ballynahinch RFC; Liam Foley, Bangor RFC)
- Referee of the Year: Chris Busby
- Women's Player of the Year: Larissa Muldoon, Railway Union RFC (nominees: Beth Cregan, Cooke RFC; Brittany Hogan, Cooke RFC)
- U18 Girls Player of the Year: Bethany McDowell, Malone RFC (nominees: Kelly McCormill, Monaghan RFC; Lucinda Kinghan, Monaghan RFC)
- Youth Player of the Year: Conor McMenamin, Letterkenny RFC (nominees: Seif Eldin Abd El Gawad, Carrickfergus RFC; Charlie Clarke, Rainey Old Boys R.F.C.)
- Schools' Player of the Year: Aaron Sexton, Bangor Grammar School (nominees: John McKee, Campbell College; Nathan Doak, Wallace High School)
- Dorrington B Faulkner Award: Mark Orr
- Club Player of the Year: Matthew Agnew, Ballymena RFC (nominees: Andrew Morrison, Banbridge RFC; Peter Cromie, Banbridge RFC)
- Club of the Year: City of Armagh RFC (nominees: Malone RFC, Grosvenor RFC)
- Special Recognition Award: Norman Pollock

== Season reviews ==
- Ulster Rugby: Who did what 2017-18, The Front Row Union, 25 June 2018
