= 2016–17 Ulster Rugby season =

Ulster Rugby
- 2016–17 season
- Head Coach: Neil Doak
- Director of Rugby: Les Kiss
- Captain: Andrew Trimble; Rob Herring
- Pro12: 5th
- European Rugby Champions Cup: 4th in Pool 5
- Top try scorer: League: Jacob Stockdale (9); All: Charles Piutau (9); Jacob Stockdale (9)
- Top points scorer: League: Paddy Jackson (124); All: Paddy Jackson (162)
Home colours	Away colours	Third colours

The 2016–17 season was Ulster's 23rd season since the advent of professionalism in rugby union, and the third under Director of Rugby Les Kiss and head coach Neil Doak. They completed in the European Rugby Champions Cup and the final season of the Pro12 before it became the Pro14 with the addition of two teams from South Africa.

Ulster announced in August 2016 that Rory Best would vacate the captaincy of the province. The Ireland captain was replaced in his role by Andrew Trimble, the team's record try-scorer, and Rob Herring, who took on the role in Best's absence the previous season. Scrum-half Ruan Pienaar was going into his last season with Ulster, after the IRFU blocked him from extending his contract.

New arrivals were South African number 8 Marcell Coetzee from the Sharks, fullback Charles Piutau from Wasps, prop Rodney Ah You from Connacht, lock Kieran Treadwell from Harlequins, out-half Brett Herron from Bath, scrum-half Angus Lloyd from Trinity, and prop Anton Peikrishvili from Brive. Back row forward Nick Williams left for Cardiff Blues, centre Sammy Arnold for Munster, wing Rory Scholes for Edinburgh, and lock Dan Tuohy for Bristol. Out-half Ian Humphreys retired, and Willie Faloon, Paul Jackson, Ruaidhri Murphy, Bronson Ross, Paul Rowley, Frank Taggart and Sam Windsor were released. Academy players who made their debuts this season included flanker Nick Timoney and wing Rob Lyttle.

Assistant coach Joe Barakat left in December to join Western Force. In early 2017 it was revealed that head coach Neil Doak and assistant coach Allen Clarke would not have their contracts renewed at the end of the season. Doak's replacement would be Jono Gibbes, with Clarke to be succeeded by Dwayne Peel.

In the Pro12, Ulster finished fifth, qualifying for next season's Champions Cup but missing out on the playoffs. Flanker Sean Reidy led the league in tackles with 263. Ulster led the league in discipline and scrums. At the end of the season, Charles Piutau was named Players' Player of the Season, and he and scrum-half Ruan Pienaar made the Pro12 Dream Team. Pienaar's try against Glasgow Warriors was named Try of the Season. They finished bottom of Pool 5 in the Champions Cup, winning two and losing four. Out-half Paddy Jackson was leading scorer with 162 points, with Ruan Pienaar contributing 100 points. Charles Piutau and wing Jacob Stockdale were joint leading try scorers with nine each. Sean Reidy was leading tackler with 329.

At the end of the season, Ruan Pienaar departed for Montpellier, and flanker Roger Wilson retired with a record 221 appearances. Charles Piutau was Ulster's Player of the Season.

== Staff ==
Position	Name	Nationality
Chief executive officer	Shane Logan	Ireland
Director of Rugby	Les Kiss	Australia
Head coach	Neil Doak	Ireland
Operation Director	Bryn Cunningham	Ireland
Assistant coach	Allen Clarke	Ireland
Assistant coach	Joe Barakat	Australia
Head of Strength & Conditioning	Jonny Davis	Ireland
Strength & conditioning coach	Kevin Geary	Ireland

== Squad ==
=== Senior squad ===
==== Players In ====
- (New Zealand) Charles Piutau from (England) Wasps
- (Ireland) Rodney Ah You from (Ireland) Connacht
- (England) Kieran Treadwell from (England) Harlequins
- (South Africa) Marcell Coetzee from (South Africa) Sharks
- (England) Brett Herron from (England) Bath Rugby
- (Ireland) Angus Lloyd from (Ireland) Trinity College Dublin
- (Ireland) Callum Patterson from (Ireland) Ballymena
- (Georgia (country)) Anton Peikrishvili from (France) CA Brive
- (Ireland) Matty Rea from (Ireland) Ballymena RFC
- (Ireland) Jonny Simpson from (Ireland) Ballynahinch RFC

==== Promoted from academy ====
- (Ireland) Jacob Stockdale
- (Ireland) David Shanahan
- (Ireland) Johnny McPhillips
- (Ireland) John Donnan
- (Ireland) Lorcan Dow
- (Ireland) Mark Best

==== Players Out ====
- (New Zealand) Nick Williams to (Wales) Cardiff Blues
- (Ireland) Sammy Arnold to (Ireland) Munster
- (Ireland) Rory Scholes to (Scotland) Edinburgh Rugby
- (Ireland) Ian Humphreys retired
- (Ireland) Dan Tuohy to (England) Bristol Rugby
- (Ireland) Willie Faloon released
- (Ireland) Paul Jackson released
- (Ireland) Ruaidhri Murphy released
- (Georgia (country)) Anton Peikrishvili to Cardiff Blues
- (Ireland) Bronson Ross released
- (Ireland) Paul Rowley released
- (Ireland) Lewis Stevenson to (England) Exeter Chiefs
- (Ireland) Frank Taggart released
- (Australia) Sam Windsor released

Ulster Rugby squad
**Props**: (Ireland) Andrew Warwick (26 apps, 12 starts); (South Africa) Wiehahn Herbst* (15 apps, 12 starts); (Ireland) **Rodney Ah You** (18 apps, 10 starts); (Ireland) Callum Black (20 apps, 9 starts); (Ireland) Ross Kane (8 apps, 2 start); (Ireland) Ricky Lutton (6 apps, 2 starts); (Ireland) Jonny Simpson (4 apps, 1 start); (Ireland) Kyle McCall (no apps); **Hookers**: (Ireland) **Rob Herring** (c) (22 apps, 13 starts, 10 pts); (Ireland) **Rory Best** (14 apps, 13 starts, 10 pts); (Ireland) John Andrew (14 apps, 2 starts); (Ireland) Jonny Murphy (no apps); **Locks**: (Ireland) **Iain Henderson** (17 apps, 16 starts, 10 pts); (South Africa) **Franco van der Merwe** (20 apps, 14 starts, 10 pts); (Ireland) Kieran Treadwell (20 apps, 13 starts); (Ireland) Alan O'Connor (14 apps, 12 starts); (England) Peter Browne* (16 apps, 9 starts); (Ireland) **Dan Tuohy** (2 apps, 2 starts); (Ireland) John Donnan (no apps)	**Back row**: (Ireland) **Sean Reidy** (27 apps, 18 starts, 20 pts); (Ireland) **Chris Henry** (15 apps, 13 starts, 10 pts); (Ireland) **Roger Wilson** (14 apps, 12 starts, 5 pts); (Ireland) Clive Ross (23 apps, 10 starts, 5 pts); (Ireland) **Robbie Diack** (17 apps, 10 starts, 5 pts); (South Africa) **Marcell Coetzee** (4 apps, 4 starts); (Ireland) Nick Timoney (3 apps); (Ireland) Conor Joyce (2 apps); (Ireland) Lorcan Dow (no apps); (Ireland) Stephen Mulholland (no apps); (Ireland) Matty Rea (no apps); **Scrum-halves**: (South Africa) **Ruan Pienaar** (23 apps, 22 starts, 100 pts); (Ireland) **Paul Marshall** (20 apps, 5 starts, 10 pts); (Ireland) David Shanahan (4 apps, 2 starts); (Ireland) Angus Lloyd (1 app); **Fly-halves**: (Ireland) **Paddy Jackson** (18 apps, 17 starts, 162 pts); (England) Brett Herron* (7 apps, 4 starts); (Australia) Sam Windsor* (2 apps, 1 start); (Ireland) Johnny McPhillips (no apps)	**Centres**: (Ireland) **Luke Marshall** (22 apps, 19 starts, 35 pts); (Ireland) **Stuart McCloskey** (16 apps, 13 starts, 10 pts); (Ireland) **Stuart Olding** (14 apps, 12 starts, 16 pts); (Ireland) **Darren Cave** (14 apps, 9 starts, 15 pts); (Ireland) **Jared Payne** (10 apps, 9 starts, 15 pts); (Ireland) Mark Best (no apps); (Ireland) Callum Patterson (no apps); **Wings**: (Ireland) **Craig Gilroy** (17 apps, 14 starts, 15 pts); (Ireland) **Tommy Bowe** (14 apps, 10 starts, 10 pts); (Ireland) **Andrew Trimble** (c) (11 apps, 10 starts, 15 pts); (Ireland) Jacob Stockdale (20 apps, 8 starts, 45 pts); (Ireland) Rob Lyttle (4 apps, 3 starts, 10 pts); (Ireland) Jack Owens (1 app); **Fullbacks**: (New Zealand) **Charles Piutau** (23 apps, 23 starts, 45 pts); (South Africa) Louis Ludik* (14 apps, 12 starts, 15 pts); (Ireland) Peter Nelson (6 apps, 4 starts, 4 pts); (Ireland) David Busby (5 apps, 4 starts, 10 pts)
(c) denotes the team captain, **Bold** denotes internationally capped players. Italics denotes academy players who appeared in the senior team.^{*} denotes players qualified to play for Ireland on residency or dual nationality. Players and their allocated positions from the Ulster Rugby website.

- Irish Provinces are currently limited to four non-Irish eligible (NIE) players and one non-Irish qualified player (NIQ or "Project Player").

=== Academy squad ===
==== Players in ====
- (Ireland) Marcus Rea from (Ireland) Ballymena Academy
- (Ireland) Adam McBurney from (Ireland) Ballymena R.F.C.
- (Ireland) Tommy O'Hagan
- (Ireland) Aaron Hall from (Ireland) Ballynahinch RFC
- (Ireland) Johnny Stewart from (Ireland) Wallace High School
- (Ireland) Aaron Cairns from (Ireland) Ballynahinch RFC
- (Ireland) Zack McCall
- (Ireland) Conall Boomer
- (Ireland) Rory Butler

==== Players out ====
- (Ireland) Jake Byrne
- (Ireland) Liam Free
- (Ireland) Conor Young

Position	Name	Nationality
Head coach	Kieran Campbell	Ireland
Strength & conditioning coach	Matthew Maguire	Ireland
Strength & conditioning coach	Matthew Godfrey	Ireland
Strength & conditioning coach	Amy Davis	Ireland
Representative Team Performance Manager	Michael Black	Ireland
Talent Development Officer	Jonny Gillespie	Ireland
Elite Player Development Officer/Head Coach Ulster 'A'	Alex Codling	Ireland
Elite Player Development Officer	James Topping	Ireland
Lead Strength & Conditioning Coach	David Drake	Ireland

Ulster Rugby Academy squad
**Props**: (Ireland) Peter Cooper **(2)**; (Ireland) Ross Kane **(2)**; (Ireland) Michael Lagan **(3)**; (Ireland) Tommy O'Hagan **(1)**; (Ireland) Craig Trenier **(3)**; **Hookers**: (Ireland) Adam McBurney **(1)**; (Ireland) Zack McCall **(1)**; **Locks**: (Ireland) Alex Thompson **(3)**	**Back row**: (Ireland) Conall Boomer **(1)**; (Ireland) Aaron Hall **(1)**; (Ireland) Marcus Rea (1); (Ireland) Nick Timoney **(2)**; **Scrum-halves**: (Ireland) Aaron Cairns **(1)**; (Ireland) Johnny Stewart **(1)**; **Fly-halves**: (Ireland) Andy McGrath **(2)**	**Centres**: (Ireland) Rory Butler **(1)**; **Wings**: (Ireland) Rob Lyttle **(2)**; (Ireland) Jack Owens **(3)**; **Fullbacks**: (Ireland) David Busby **(3)**
(c) denotes the team captain, **Bold** denotes internationally capped players, number in brackets indicates players stage in the three-year academy cycle.^{*} denotes players qualified to play for Ireland on residency or dual nationality. Players and their allocated positions from the Ulster Rugby website.

== Season record ==
Competition	Played	Won	Drawn	Lost	PF	PA	PD	TF	TA
2016-17 Champions Cup	6	2	0	4	131	173	-42	16	19
2016-17 Pro12	22	14	1	7	521	371	150	68	47
Total	28	16	1	11	652	544	108	84	66

== European Rugby Champions Cup ==
Team	P	W	D	L	PF	PA	Diff	TF	TA	TB	LB	Pts
(France) Clermont (1)	6	5	0	1	211	131	+80	26	18	5	1	26
(France) Bordeaux Bègles	6	3	0	3	118	120	–2	11	13	1	1	14
(England) Exeter Chiefs	6	2	0	4	110	146	–36	13	16	2	2	12
(Ireland) Ulster	6	2	0	4	131	173	–42	16	19	1	1	10

16 October 2016	Bordeaux Bègles (France)	28–13	(Ireland) Ulster	Stade Chaban-Delmas, Bordeaux
14:00	Try: Taofifenua 74' m Penalty try 77' c Connor 79' c Con: Beauxis (2/3) 77', 79'; Pen: Madigan (2/2) 3', 45'; Beauxis (1/1) 54'	Report; Match centre Highlights	Try: Trimble 21' c Con: Jackson (1/1) 21'; Pen: Jackson (2/2) 39', 57'; Cards: Reidy (yellow card) 75'	Attendance: 21,132; Referee: JP Doyle (RFU)
Ulster lineup: 1. Andrew Warwick, 2. Rory Best, 3. Rodney Ah You, 4. Alan O'Connor, 5. Franco van der Merwe, 6. Iain Henderson, 7. Clive Ross, 8. Sean Reidy, 9. Ruan Pienaar, 10. Paddy Jackson, 11. Craig Gilroy, 12. Stuart Olding, 13. Luke Marshall, 14. Andrew Trimble, 15. Jared Payne.; Replacements: 16. Rob Herring (for Van der Merwe), 17. Kyle McCall (for Warwick 60'), 18. Ross Kane (for Ah You 47'), 19. Peter Browne (for O'Connor), 20. Roger Wilson (for Ross 60'), 21. Paul Marshall (for Pienaar 75'), 22. Jacob Stockdale (for Gilroy 75'), 23. Rob Lyttle.				Attendance: 21,132; Referee: JP Doyle (RFU)

22 October 2016	Ulster (Ireland)	19–18	(England) Exeter Chiefs (1 BP)	Ravenhill Stadium, Belfast
19:45	Try: Reidy 31' c Con: Jackson (1/1) 31'; Pen: Jackson (3/3) 5', 49', 71'; Drop: Jackson (1/1) 78'	Report; Match centre	Pen: Steenson (5/5) 7', 29', 51', 67', 74'; Drop: Steenson (1/2) 77'	Attendance: 16,843; Referee: Alexandre Ruiz (FFR)
Ulster lineup: 1. Kyle McCall, 2. Rory Best, 3. Rodney Ah You, 4. Peter Browne, 5. Franco van der Merwe, 6. Iain Henderson, 7. Sean Reidy, 8. Roger Wilson, 9. Ruan Pienaar, 10. Paddy Jackson, 11. Charles Piutau, 12. Stuart Olding, 13. Luke Marshall, 14. Andrew Trimble, 15. Jared Payne.; Replacements: 16. Rob Herring (for Wilson 66'), 17. Andrew Warwick (for Kane 78'), 18. Ross Kane (for Ah You 48'), 19. Alan O'Connor (for Browne 21'), 20. Clive Ross (for Henderson 40'), 21. Paul Marshall, 22. Craig Gilroy (for Trimble 67'), 23. Tommy Bowe (for L Marshall 78').				Attendance: 16,843; Referee: Alexandre Ruiz (FFR)

10 December 2016	(1 BP) Ulster (Ireland)	39–32	(France) Clermont (2 BP)	Ravenhill Stadium, Belfast
13:00	Try: Marshall (2) 6' c, 44' c Henderson 15' m Jackson 34' c Piutau 53' c Con: Jackson (4/5) 6', 35', 46', 54'; Pen: Jackson (2/2) 21', 57'; Cards: Ah You (yellow card) 74'	Report; Match centre	Try: Yato 1' c Spedding 30' m Abendanon 62' c Chouly 73' c Con: Parra (3/4) 2', 62', 73'; Pen: Parra (2/2) 9', 26'	Attendance: 16,316; Referee: Wayne Barnes (RFU)
Ulster lineup: 1. Kyle McCall, 2. Rory Best, 3. Wiehahn Herbst, 4. Peter Browne, 5. Robbie Diack, 6. Iain Henderson, 7. Chris Henry, 8. Sean Reidy, 9. Ruan Pienaar, 10. Paddy Jackson, 11. Louis Ludik, 12. Stuart McCloskey, 13. Luke Marshall, 14. Tommy Bowe, 15. Charles Piutau.; Replacements: 16. Rob Herring (for Best 77'), 17. Andrew Warwick (for McCall 56'), 18. Rodney Ah You (for Herbst 61'), 19. Kieran Treadwell (for Diack 41'), 20. Clive Ross (for Reidy 74'), 21. Paul Marshall, 22. Darren Cave (for McCloskey 68'), 23. Jacob Stockdale.				Attendance: 16,316; Referee: Wayne Barnes (RFU)

18 December 2016	(1 BP) Clermont (France)	38–19	(Ireland) Ulster	Stade Marcel-Michelin, Clermont-Ferrand
16:15	Try: Toeava 1' c Abendanon (2) 17' c, 23' c Lopez 41' c Penalty try 77' c Con: Parra (4/4) 2', 19', 24', 42'; Lopez (1/1) 78'; Pen: Lopez (1/1) 69'	Report; Match centre	Try: Bowe (2) 56' c, 65' m Van der Merwe 61' c Con: Jackson (2/3) 57', 61'; Cards: Jackson (yellow card) 77'	Attendance: 18,739; Referee: Marius Mitrea (FIR)
Ulster lineup: 1. Kyle McCall, 2. Rory Best, 3. Wiehahn Herbst, 4. Peter Browne, 5. Franco van der Merwe, 6. Iain Henderson, 7. Chris Henry, 8. Sean Reidy, 9. Ruan Pienaar, 10. Paddy Jackson, 11. Louis Ludik, 12. Stuart McCloskey, 13. Luke Marshall, 14. Tommy Bowe, 15. Charles Piutau.; Replacements: 16. Rob Herring (for Best 61'), 17. Andrew Warwick (for McCall), 18. Rodney Ah You (for Herbst 51'), 19. Kieran Treadwell (for Browne 51'), 20. Clive Ross (for Henry 68'), 21. Paul Marshall (for Pienaar 66'), 22. Darren Cave (for L. Marshall 51'), 23. Jacob Stockdale (for Bowe 72').				Attendance: 18,739; Referee: Marius Mitrea (FIR)

15 January 2017	(1 BP) Exeter Chiefs (England)	31–19	(Ireland) Ulster	Sandy Park, Exeter
17:30	Try: Campagnaro (2) 20' m, 53' m Waldrom (2) 29' c, 50' c Penalty try 70' c Con: Steenson (3/5) 29', 50', 71'	Report; Match centre	Try: Reidy 2' m Piutau (2) 33' c, 59' c Con: Jackson (2/3) 34', 60'; Cards: Jackson (yellow card) 70'	Attendance: 10,671; Referee: Romain Poite (FFR)
Ulster lineup: 1. Callum Black, 2. Rory Best, 3. Ross Kane, 4. Kieran Treadwell, 5. Peter Browne, 6. Iain Henderson, 7. Chris Henry, 8. Sean Reidy, 9. David Shanahan, 10. Paddy Jackson, 11. Andrew Trimble, 12. Stuart McCloskey, 13. Luke Marshall, 14. Charles Piutau, 15. Louis Ludik.; Replacements: 16. John Andrew (for Best 77'), 17. Andrew Warwick (for Black 46'), 18. Jonny Simpson (for Kane 34'), 19. Franco van der Merwe (for Treadwell 64'), 20. Clive Ross (for Browne 55'), 21. Paul Marshall (for Shanahan 77'), 22. Brett Herron (for Trimble 73'), 23. Jacob Stockdale (for L Marshall 61').				Attendance: 10,671; Referee: Romain Poite (FFR)

21 January 2017	(1 BP) Ulster (Ireland)	22–26	(France) Bordeaux Bègles	Ravenhill Stadium, Belfast
13:00	Try: Trimble 18' m Van der Merwe 27' c Cave 58' c Con: Jackson (2/3) 29', 58'; Pen: Jackson (1/2) 40'	Report; Match centre	Try: Lesgourgues 11' c Tauleigne 22' c Con: Madigan (2/2) 13', 23'; Pen: Madigan (2/2) 1', 31'; Hickey (2/2) 70', 74'; Cards: Cros (yellow card) 40+1'	Attendance: 14,924; Referee: Matthew Carley (RFU)
Ulster lineup: 1. Andrew Warwick, 2. Rory Best, 3. Jonny Simpson, 4. Robbie Diack, 5. Franco van der Merwe, 6. Iain Henderson, 7. Chris Henry, 8. Sean Reidy, 9. David Shanahan, 10. Paddy Jackson, 11. Andrew Trimble, 12. Stuart McCloskey, 13. Darren Cave, 14. Tommy Bowe, 15. Charles Piutau.; Replacements: 16. John Andrew, 17. Callum Black (for Warwick 70'), 18. Ricky Lutton, 19. Kieran Treadwell (for Diack 46'), 20. Clive Ross (for Van der Merwe 54'), 21. Paul Marshall (for Shanahan 41'), 22. Brett Herron, 23. Craig Gilroy (for Bowe 63').				Attendance: 14,924; Referee: Matthew Carley (RFU)

== Pro12 ==
2016–17 Pro12
	Team	P	W	D	L	PF	PA	PD	TF	TA	Try bonus	Losing bonus	Pts
1	(Ireland) Munster (RU)	22	19	0	3	602	316	+286	77	34	9	1	86
2	(Ireland) Leinster (SF)	22	18	0	4	674	390	+284	91	47	12	1	85
3	(Wales) Scarlets (CH)	22	17	0	5	537	359	+178	66	40	9	0	77
4	(Wales) Ospreys (SF)	22	14	0	8	556	360	+196	74	42	10	3	69
5	(Ireland) Ulster	22	14	1	7	521	371	+150	68	47	6	4	68
6	(Scotland) Glasgow Warriors	22	11	0	11	540	464	+76	72	53	9	5	58
7	(Wales) Cardiff Blues	22	11	1	10	508	498	+10	59	60	3	4	53
8	(Ireland) Connacht	22	9	0	13	413	498	−85	47	61	5	3	44
9	(Scotland) Edinburgh	22	6	0	16	400	491	−91	46	59	1	6	31
10	(Italy) Benetton Treviso	22	5	0	17	316	664	−348	35	92	1	2	23
11	(Wales) Newport Gwent Dragons	22	4	0	18	368	569	−201	38	71	1	6	23
12	(Italy) Zebre	22	3	0	19	318	773	−455	38	105	1	6	19
If teams are level at any stage, tiebreakers are applied in the following order: 1. number of matches won; 2. the difference between points for and points against; 3. the number of tries scored; 4. the most points scored; 5. the difference between tries for and tries against; 6. the fewest red cards received; 7. the fewest yellow cards received.
Green background (rows 1 to 4) are play-off places and earn a place in the 2017–18 European Rugby Champions Cup. Blue background indicates teams outside the play-off places that earn a place in the European Rugby Champions Cup. Yellow background advances to a play-off for a chance to compete in the Champions Cup. (Q) indicates team has qualified for the play-offs and has qualified for the 2017–18 European Rugby Champions Cup.

2 September 2016	(1 BP) Ulster (Ireland)	29–8	(Wales) Newport Gwent Dragons	Ravenhill Stadium, Belfast
19:35	Try: Lyttle (2) 21' c, 65' m Stockdale 26' m Pienaar 43' m Herring 71' c Con: Pienaar (2/5)	Report; Match centre Highlights	Try: Howard 11' m Pen: Macleod (1/1) 5'	Attendance: 13,789; Referee: Marius Mitrea (FIR)
Ulster lineup: 1. Callum Black, 2. Rob Herring, 3. Ross Kane, 4. Peter Browne, 5. Franco van der Merwe, 6. Clive Ross, 7. Sean Reidy, 8. Roger Wilson, 9. Ruan Pienaar, 10. Brett Herron, 11. Jacob Stockdale, 12. Stuart McCloskey, 13. Stuart Olding, 14. Craig Gilroy, 15. Charles Piutau.; Replacements: 16. John Andrew (for Reidy 74'), 17. Kyle McCall (for Black 50'), 18. Andrew Warwick (for Kane 58'), 19. Alan O'Connor (for Browne 56'), 20. Robbie Diack (for Wilson 56'), 21. Paul Marshall (for Piutau 74'), 22. Sam Windsor (for McCloskey 60'), 23. Rob Lyttle (for Gilroy 12').				Attendance: 13,789; Referee: Marius Mitrea (FIR)

10 September 2016	Benetton Treviso (Italy)	11–22	(Ireland) Ulster	Stadio Comunale di Monigo, Treviso
20:05	Try: Benvenuti 80' m Pen: Allan (2/2) 29', 37'; Cards: Paulo (yellow card)	Report; Highlights	Try: Marshall 4' c Herring 54' m Pienaar 58' c Con: Pienaar (2/3) 4', 58'; Pen: Pienaar (1/1) 30'; Cards: Olding (yellow card); Herring (yellow card)	Attendance: 2,800; Referee: Dudley Phillips (IRFU)
Ulster lineup: 1. Kyle McCall, 2. Rob Herring, 3. Rodney Ah You, 4. Kieran Treadwell, 5. Franco van der Merwe, 6. Clive Ross, 7. Sean Reidy, 8. Roger Wilson, 9. Ruan Pienaar, 10. Brett Herron, 11. Jacob Stockdale, 12. Stuart Olding, 13. Luke Marshall, 14. Rob Lyttle, 15. Louis Ludik.; Replacements: 16. John Andrew (for Van der Merwe 69'), 17. Andrew Warwick (for McCall 62'), 18. Ross Kane (for Ah You 49'), 19. Peter Browne (for Treadwell 44'), 20. Robbie Diack (for Wilson 62'), 21. Angus Lloyd, 22. Stuart McCloskey (for Herron 74'), 23. Darren Cave (for Marshall).				Attendance: 2,800; Referee: Dudley Phillips (IRFU)

16 September 2016	Ulster (Ireland)	19–8	(Wales) Scarlets	Ravenhill Stadium, Belfast
19:05	Try: Ludik 18' m Henderson 79' m Pen: Jackson (3/3) 9', 16', 70'	Report; Highlights	Try: Boyde 74' m Pen: Patchell (1/2) 47'; Cards: Ball (yellow card)	Attendance: 13,663; Referee: Ben Whitehouse (WRU)
Ulster lineup: 1. Callum Black, 2. Rob Herring, 3. Rodney Ah You, 4. Peter Browne, 5. Alan O'Connor, 6. Clive Ross, 7. Sean Reidy, 8. Robbie Diack, 9. Ruan Pienaar, 10. Paddy Jackson, 11. Louis Ludik, 12. Stuart McCloskey, 13. Stuart Olding, 14. Craig Gilroy, 15. Charles Piutau.; Replacements: 16. John Andrew, 17. Andrew Warwick (for Black 64'), 18. Ross Kane (for Ah You 52'), 19. Franco van der Merwe (for Browne 55'), 20. Iain Henderson (for Ross 41'), 21. Angus Lloyd, 22. Luke Marshall (for Olding 64-68'), 23. Rob Lyttle (for L. Marshall 68').				Attendance: 13,663; Referee: Ben Whitehouse (WRU)

23 September 2016	(1 BP) Glasgow Warriors (Scotland)	17–22	(Ireland) Ulster	Scotstoun Stadium, Glasgow
19:35	Try: Reid 19' c Seymour 57' c Con: Russell (2/2) 19', 57'; Pen: Russell (1/1) 48'; Cards: Sarto (yellow card)	Report; Highlights	Try: Cave 16' m Penalty try 39' c Jackson 62' c Con: Jackson (2/3) 39', 62'; Pen: Jackson (1/1) 6'; Cards: Henderson (yellow card)	Attendance: 7,351; Referee: Ian Davies (WRU)
Ulster lineup: 1. Andrew Warwick, 2. Rob Herring, 3. Rodney Ah You, 4. Alan O'Connor, 5. Franco van der Merwe, 6. Iain Henderson, 7. Sean Reidy, 8. Roger Wilson, 9. Ruan Pienaar, 10. Paddy Jackson, 11. Charles Piutau, 12. Stuart McCloskey, 13. Darren Cave, 14. Louis Ludik, 15. Jared Payne.; Replacements: 16. Rory Best (for Herring 48'), 17. Callum Black (for Warwick 60'), 18. Ross Kane (for Ah You 54'), 19. Peter Browne (for O'Connor 54'), 20. Clive Ross (for Wilson 58'), 21. Paul Marshall, 22. Stuart Olding (for McCloskey 13'), 23. Rob Lyttle (for Olding 51').				Attendance: 7,351; Referee: Ian Davies (WRU)

1 October 2016	Ulster (Ireland)	9–7	(Wales) Ospreys (1 BP)	Ravenhill Stadium, Belfast
18:30	Pen: Jackson (3/5) 28', 44', 79'	Report; Highlights	Try: Smith 5' c Con: Biggar (1/1)	Attendance: 15,767; Referee: Ben Whitehouse (WRU)
Ulster lineup: 1. Kyle McCall, 2. Rory Best, 3. Rodney Ah You, 4. Alan O'Connor, 5. Franco van der Merwe, 6. Iain Henderson, 7. Robbie Diack, 8. Roger Wilson, 9. Paul Marshall, 10. Paddy Jackson, 11. Louis Ludik, 12. Darren Cave, 13. Jared Payne, 14. Craig Gilroy, 15. Charles Piutau.; Replacements: 16. John Andrew (for Best 69'), 17. Callum Black (for McCall 58'), 18. Ross Kane (for Ah You 60'), 19. Kieran Treadwell (for O'Connor 66'), 20. Clive Ross (for Wilson 53'), 21. Ruan Pienaar (for P Marshall 56'), 22. Brett Herron, 23. Tommy Bowe (for Gilroy 60').				Attendance: 15,767; Referee: Ben Whitehouse (WRU)

7 October 2016	(1 BP) Connacht (Ireland)	30–25	(Ireland) Ulster (1 BP)	The Sportsground, Galway
19:35	Try: Carty 2' c Kelleher (2) 23' m, 52' m Connolly 25' c Con: Carty (2/4); Pen: Carty (2/2) 37', 59'; Cards: Carey (yellow card)	Report match centre Highlights	Try: Gilroy 33' m Best 41' c Payne 44' c Con: Jackson (2/3); Pen: Jackson (2/2) 5', 65'	Attendance: 6,194; Referee: Gary Conway (IRFU)
Ulster lineup: 1. Callum Black, 2. Rory Best, 3. Rodney Ah You, 4. Robbie Diack, 5. Peter Browne, 6. Iain Henderson, 7. Clive Ross, 8. Roger Wilson, 9. Paul Marshall, 10. Paddy Jackson, 11. Graig Gilroy, 12. Darren Cave, 13. Louis Ludik, 14. Tommy Bowe, 15. Jared Payne.; Replacements: 16. Rob Herring (for Best 63'), 17. Andrew Warwick (for Black 55'), 18. Ross Kane (for Ah You 57'), 19. Kieran Treadwell (for Browne 63'), 20. Sean Reidy (for Wilson 56'), 21. Dave Shanahan, 22. Brett Herron (for Ludik 63'), 23. Rob Lyttle (for Cave 41').				Attendance: 6,194; Referee: Gary Conway (IRFU)

28 October 2016	(1 BP) Ulster (Ireland)	14–15	(Ireland) Munster	Ravenhill Stadium, Belfast
19:35	Try: Piutau 4' c Lyttle 34' c Con: Jackson (2/2) 5', 35'	Report; Match centre Highlights	Try: Scannell 40' m Taute 63' c Con: Scannell (1/2) 64'; Drop: Scannell (1/1) 74'	Attendance: 17,629; Referee: Nigel Owens (WRU)
Ulster lineup: 1. Callum Black, 2. Rob Herring, 3. Wiehahn Herbst, 4. Dan Tuohy, 5. Franco van der Merwe, 6. Robbie Diack, 7. Sean Reidy, 8. Roger Wilson, 9. Ruan Pienaar, 10. Paddy Jackson, 11. Craig Gilroy, 12. Darren Cave, 13. Luke Marshall, 14. Tommy Bowe, 15. Charles Piutau.; Replacements: 16. John Andrew, 17. Kyle McCall (for Black 57'), 18. Andrew Warwick (for Herbst 65'), 19. Clive Ross (for Wilson 28'), 20. Conor Joyce, 21. Paul Marshall (for Pienaar 75'), 22. Brett Herron, 23. Rob Lyttle (for Cave 8').				Attendance: 17,629; Referee: Nigel Owens (WRU)

4 November 2016	Edinburgh (Scotland)	28–17	(Ireland) Ulster	Murrayfield Stadium, Edinburgh
19:35	Try: Mata 3' c Hoyland 10' m Bradbury 47' c Con: Tovey (2/3) 3', 47'; Pen: Kinghorn (1/1) 17'; Weir (2/2) 29', 35'	Report; Match centre	Try: Cairns 67' c Stockdale 72' c Con: Pienaar (2/2) 67', 72'; Pen: Pienaar (1/1) 26'	Attendance: 3,556; Referee: Andrew Brace (IRFU)
Ulster lineup: 1. Kyle McCall, 2. Rob Herring, 3. Wiehahn Herbst, 4. Dan Tuohy, 5. Franco van der Merwe, 6. Peter Browne, 7. Clive Ross, 8. Sean Reidy, 9. Ruan Pienaar, 10. Brett Herron, 11. Rob Lyttle, 12. Sam Windsor, 13. Luke Marshall, 14. Tommy Bowe, 15. Charles Piutau.; Replacements: 16. John Andrew, 17. Andrew Warwick (for McCall 54'), 18. Ross Kane (for Herbst 41'-64'), 19. Robbie Diack (for Van der Merwe 43'), 20. Conor Joyce (for Tuohy 41'), 21. Paul Marshall (for Windsor 64'), 22. Aaron Cairns (for Bowe 64'), 23. Jacob Stockdale (for Herron 43').				Attendance: 3,556; Referee: Andrew Brace (IRFU)

3 December 2016	Cardiff Blues (Wales)	22–35	(Ireland) Ulster (1 BP)	Cardiff Arms Park
17:15	Try: Dacey 40' m Halaholo 70' c Cuthbert 74' c Con: Robinson (2/3) 70', 74'; Pen: Shingler (1/1) 5'; Cards: Scully (yellow card)	Report; Match centre Highlights	Try: Piutau 25' c McCloskey 29' c McCall 37' c Henry 62' c Ludik 75' c Con: Pienaar (5/5) 25', 29', 37', 62', 75'; Cards: Marshall (yellow card)	Attendance: 6,010; Referee: Andrew Brace (IRFU)
Ulster lineup: 1. Kyle McCall, 2. Rob Herring, 3. Wiehahn Herbst, 4. Peter Browne, 5. Franco van der Merwe, 6. Iain Henderson, 7. Chris Henry, 8. Sean Reidy, 9. Ruan Pienaar, 10. Brett Herron, 11. Craig Gilroy, 12. Stuart McCloskey, 13. Luke Marshall, 14. Tommy Bowe, 15. Charles Piutau.; Replacements: 16. John Andrew, 17. Andrew Warwick (for McCall 64'), 18. Rodney Ah You (for Herbst 53'), 19. Kieran Treadwell (for Van der Merwe 47'), 20. Clive Ross (for Gilroy 73'), 21. Paul Marshall (for Herring 61'), 22. Louis Ludik (for L Marshall 69'), 23. Darren Cave (for McCloskey 69').				Attendance: 6,010; Referee: Andrew Brace (IRFU)

23 December 2016	Ulster (Ireland)	23–7	(Ireland) Connacht	Ravenhill Stadium, Belfast
19:35	Try: McCloskey 26' c Ross 52' c Con: Jackson (2/2) 28', 53'; Pen: Jackson (3/3) 20', 36', 67'	Report; Match centre Highlights	Try: Carty 55'; Con: Carty (1/1) 56'	Attendance: 17,613; Referee: George Clancy (IRFU)
Ulster lineup: 1. Andrew Warwick, 2. Rory Best, 3. Rodney Ah You, 4. Kieran Treadwell, 5. Iain Henderson, 6. Clive Ross, 7. Chris Henry, 8. Roger Wilson, 9. Ruan Pienaar, 10. Paddy Jackson, 11. Jacob Stockdale, 12. Stuart McCloskey, 13. Luke Marshall, 14. Louis Ludik, 15. Charles Piutau.; Replacements: 16. Rob Herring (for Best 66'), 17. Callum Black (for Warwick 57'), 18. Wiehahn Herbst (for Ah You 57'), 19. Franco van der Merwe (for Ross 67'), 20. Sean Reidy (for Wilson 40'), 21. Paul Marshall (for Pienaar 54'), 22. Darren Cave (for L. Marshall 52') 23. Tommy Bowe (for McCloskey 73').				Attendance: 17,613; Referee: George Clancy (IRFU)

31 December 2016	Leinster (Ireland)	22–7	(Ireland) Ulster	RDS Arena, Dublin
15:00	Try: O'Loughlin (2) 6' c, 41' m L. McGrath 32' c Con: Nacewa (2/3) 7', 33'; Pen: Nacewa (1/1) 17'; Cards: McGrath (yellow card)	Report; Match centre Highlights	Try: Piutau 76' c Con: Pienaar (1/1) 76'	Attendance: 18,200; Referee: John Lacey (IRFU)
Ulster lineup: 1. Andrew Warwick, 2. Rob Herring, 3. Rodney Ah You, 4. Kieran Treadwell, 5. Franco van der Merwe, 6. Clive Ross, 7. Sean Reidy, 8. Roger Wilson, 9. Paul Marshall, 10. Ruan Pienaar, 11. Tommy Bowe, 12. Stuart McCloskey, 13. Darren Cave, 14. Andrew Trimble, 15. Charles Piutau.; Replacements: 16. John Andrew (for Herring 28'), 17. Callum Black (for Warwick 65'), 18. Jonny Simpson (for Ah You 48'), 19. Peter Browne (for Van der Merwe 73'), 20. Chris Henry (for Wilson 54'), 21. Brett Herron (for Marshall 74'), 22. Louis Ludik (for Trimble 59'), 23. Jacob Stockdale (for Bowe 66').				Attendance: 18,200; Referee: John Lacey (IRFU)

6 January 2017	Scarlets (Wales)	16–13	(Ireland) Ulster (1 BP)	Parc y Scarlets, Llanelli
19:35	Try: Penalty try 61' c Con: D. Jones (1/1) 61'; Pen: D. Jones (3/3) 10', 13', 52'; Cards: Ball (yellow card)	Report; Match centre	Try: Stockdale 20' c Con: Jackson (1/1) 21'; Pen: Jackson (2/2) 16', 40'; Cards: Reidy (yellow card)	Attendance: 6,593; Referee: Marius Mitrea (FIR)
Ulster lineup: 1. Callum Black, 2. Rory Best, 3. Ross Kane, 4. Kieran Treadwell, 5. Iain Henderson, 6. Clive Ross, 7. Chris Henry, 8. Sean Reidy, 9. Paul Marshall, 10. Paddy Jackson, 11. Jacob Stockdale, 12. Stuart McCloskey, 13. Luke Marshall, 14. Andrew Trimble, 15. Louis Ludik.; Replacements: 16. John Andrew, 17. Andrew Warwick (for Black 51'), 18. Jonny Simpson (for Kane 58'), 19. Franco van der Merwe (for Ross 74'), 20. Peter Browne (for Treadwell 62'), 21. David Shanahan (for P Marshall 53'), 22. Brett Herron, 23. Tommy Bowe (for Stockdale 74').				Attendance: 6,593; Referee: Marius Mitrea (FIR)

10 February 2017	(1 BP) Ulster (Ireland)	24–18	(Scotland) Edinburgh (1 BP)	Ravenhill Stadium, Belfast
19:35	Try: P. Marshall 10' c Cave 19' m Ludik 27' m Stockdale 33' c Con: Nelson (2/4) 10', 33'	Report; Match centre Highlights	Try: Bradbury 2' m McInally 36' m Hoyland 58' m Pen: Hidalgo-Clyne (1/1) 65'	Attendance: 15,462; Referee: Nigel Owens (WRU)
Ulster lineup: 1. Andrew Warwick, 2. John Andrew, 3. Ricky Lutton, 4. Kieran Treadwell, 5. Alan O'Connor, 6. Robbie Diack, 7. Chris Henry, 8. Marcell Coetzee, 9. Paul Marshall, 10. Peter Nelson, 11. Charles Piutau, 12. Stuart Olding, 13. Darren Cave, 14. Jacob Stockdale, 15. Louis Ludik.; Replacements: 16. Jonny Murphy (for O'Connor 74'), 17. Callum Black (for Warwick 55'), 18. Wiehahn Herbst (for Lutton 40'), 19. Peter Browne (for Treadwell 63'), 20. Sean Reidy (for Coetzee 60'), 21. David Shanahan (for P. Marshall 67'), 22. Stuart McCloskey (for Cave 40'), 23. Tommy Bowe (for Piutau 50').				Attendance: 15,462; Referee: Nigel Owens (WRU)

18 February 2017	(1 BP) Ulster (Ireland)	37–17	(Scotland) Glasgow Warriors	Ravenhill Stadium, Belfast
15:00	Try: Bowe 22' m Penalty try 33' c Stockdale (2) 49' c, 78' c Pienaar 53' m Con: Pienaar (3/5) 33', 49', 78'; Pen: Pienaar (2/2) 10', 45'	Report; Match centre Highlights	Try: Thomson 40' m Cummings (2) 69' m, 74' c Con: Thomson (1/3) 74'; Cards: Harley (yellow card)	Attendance: 16,545; Referee: Dan Jones (WRU)
Ulster lineup: 1. Callum Black, 2. John Andrew, 3. Ricky Lutton, 4. Peter Browne, 5. Franco van der Merwe, 6. Sean Reidy, 7. Chris Henry, 8. Marcell Coetzee, 9. Ruan Pienaar, 10. Peter Nelson, 11. Craig Gilroy, 12. Darren Cave, 13. Luke Marshall, 14. Tommy Bowe, 15. Louis Ludik.; Replacements: 16. Rob Herring, 17. Andrew Warwick (for Black 41'), 18. Wiehahn Herbst (for Lutton 41'), 19. Kieran Treadwell (for Browne 57'), 20. Robbie Diack (for Henry 76'), 21. Paul Marshall (for Cave 41'), 22. Jacob Stockdale, 23. Jack Owens (for Nelson 68').				Attendance: 16,545; Referee: Dan Jones (WRU)

26 February 2017	Zebre (Italy)	17–40	(Ireland) Ulster (1 BP)	Stadio Sergio Lanfranchi, Parma
13:30	Try: Palazzani 17' c Bellini 59' c Con: Palazzani (2/2) 17', 59'; Pen: Palazzani (1/1) 36'	Report; Match centre Highlights	Try: Henry 7' c Pienaar 14' c Olding 45' c Stockdale 51' c Diack 71' c Busby 78' m Con: Pienaar (5/6) 7', 14', 45', 51', 71'	Attendance: 2,000; Referee: Sean Gallagher (IRFU)
Ulster lineup: 1. Andrew Warwick, 2. Rob Herring, 3. Wiehahn Herbst, 4. Robbie Diack, 5. Alan O'Connor, 6. Clive Ross, 7. Chris Henry, 8. Sean Reidy, 9. Ruan Pienaar, 10. Peter Nelson, 11. Charles Piutau, 12. Stuart Olding, 13. Luke Marshall, 14. Tommy Bowe, 15. Jacob Stockdale.; Replacements: 16. John Andrew (for Herring 56'), 17. Callum Black (for Warwick 64'), 18. Ricky Lutton (for Herbst 33'), 19. Kieran Treadwell (for O'Connor 73'), 20. Roger Wilson (for Henry 60'), 21. Paul Marshall (for Nelson 73'), 22. Jared Payne (for L. Marshall 60'), 23. David Busby (for Piutau 76').				Attendance: 2,000; Referee: Sean Gallagher (IRFU)

3 March 2017	Ulster (Ireland)	19–7	(Italy) Benetton Treviso	Ravenhill Stadium, Belfast
19:35	Try: Payne 20' c Reidy 52' c Piutau 57' m Con: Pienaar (2/3) 21', 53'	Report; Match centre Highlights	Try: Paulo 70' c Con: McKinley (1/1) 70'; Cards: Minto (yellow card)	Attendance: 15,196; Referee: Dan Jones (WRU)
Ulster lineup: 1. Callum Black, 2. Rob Herring, 3. Wiehahn Herbst, 4. Kieran Treadwell, 5. Franco van der Merwe, 6. Roger Wilson, 7. Sean Reidy, 8. Marcell Coetzee, 9. Ruan Pienaar, 10. Peter Nelson, 11. Charles Piutau, 12. Stuart Olding, 13. Jared Payne, 14. Andrew Trimble, 15. Craig Gilroy.; Replacements: 16. John Andrew (for Herring 72'), 17. Andrew Warwick (for Black 54'), 18. Ricky Lutton (for Herbst 54'), 19. Peter Browne (for Reidy 67'), 20. Clive Ross (for Wilson 49'), 21. Paul Marshall, 22. Luke Marshall (for Nelson 55'), 23. Jacob Stockdale (for Gilroy 62').				Attendance: 15,196; Referee: Dan Jones (WRU)

11 March 2017	(1 BP) Ulster (Ireland)	68–21	(Italy) Zebre	Ravenhill Stadium, Belfast
18:05	Try: L. Marshall (2) 6' c, 14' c Pienaar 17' c Piutau (2) 25' c, 46' c Stockdale 30' c Gilroy 43' m Andrew 53' c Olding 68' c P. Marshall 71' c Con: Pienaar (6/7) 7', 15', 18', 26', 31', 45'; Olding (3/3) 54', 69', 72'	Report; Match centre Highlights	Try: De Marchi 12' c Roan 66' c Greeff 75' c Con: Bordoli (1/1) 12'; Palazzani (2/2) 67', 76'; Cards: Koegelenberg (yellow card)	Attendance: 16,483; Referee: Ian Davies (WRU)
Ulster lineup: 1. Callum Black, 2. Rob Herring, 3. Wiehahn Herbst, 4. Kieran Treadwell, 5. Alan O'Connor, 6. Robbie Diack, 7. Chris Henry, 8. Marcell Coetzee, 9. Ruan Pienaar, 10. Stuart Olding, 11. Charles Piutau, 12. Luke Marshall, 13. Jacob Stockdale, 14. Craig Gilroy, 15. Jared Payne.; Replacements: 16. John Andrew (for Henry 50'), 17. Andrew Warwick (for Black 50'), 18. Rodney Ah You (for Herbst 50'), 19. Franco van der Merwe (for O'Connor 66'), 20. Clive Ross, 21. Paul Marshall (for Pienaar 46'), 22. Peter Nelson (for Payne 55'), 23. David Busby (for Piutau 74').				Attendance: 16,483; Referee: Ian Davies (WRU)

24 March 2017	Newport Gwent Dragons (Wales)	17–27	(Ireland) Ulster	Rodney Parade, Newport
19:35	Try: Landman 48' c Griffiths 67' c Con: O'Brien (2/2) 48', 67'; Pen: O'Brien (1/1) 13'	Report; Match centre	Try: Gilroy 8' c Payne 59' c Andrew 79' c Con: Pienaar (2/2) 8', 59'; Jackson 79'; Pen: Pienaar (1/1) 34'; Jackson (1/1) 74'; Cards: Gilroy (yellow card)	Attendance: 4,877; Referee: Mike Adamson (SRU)
Ulster lineup: 1. Andrew Warwick, 2. Rob Herring, 3. Wiehahn Herbst, 4. Kieran Treadwell, 5. Alan O'Connor, 6. Iain Henderson, 7. Chris Henry, 8. Sean Reidy, 9. Ruan Pienaar, 10. Stuart Olding, 11. Charles Piutau, 12. Darren Cave, 13. Luke Marshall, 14. Craig Gilroy, 15. Jared Payne.; Replacements: 16. John Andrew (for Herring 75'), 17. Callum Black (for Warwick 61'), 18. Rodney Ah You (for Herbst 76'), 19. Robbie Diack (for Henry 71'), 20. Clive Ross (for O'Connor 60'), 21. Paul Marshall (for Pienaar 65'), 22. Paddy Jackson (for Olding 50'), 23. Jacob Stockdale.				Attendance: 4,877; Referee: Mike Adamson (SRU)

7 April 2017	Ulster (Ireland)	24–24	(Wales) Cardiff Blues	Ravenhill Stadium, Belfast
19:35	Try: Jackson 10' c Penalty try 27' c L. Marshall 68' c Con: Jackson (3/3) 11', 27', 69'; Pen: Jackson (1/1) 56'	Report; Match centre Highlights	Try: Warburton 22' c Lee-Lo (2) 46' c, 59' c Con: Anscombe (3/3) 23', 47', 60'; Pen: Anscombe (1/1) 8'	Attendance: 15,752; Referee: Ian Davies (WRU)
Ulster lineup: 1. Andrew Warwick, 2. Rory Best, 3. Wiehahn Herbst, 4. Kieran Treadwell, 5. Alan O'Connor, 6. Iain Henderson, 7. Sean Reidy, 8. Roger Wilson, 9. Ruan Pienaar, 10. Paddy Jackson, 11. Charles Piutau, 12. Stuart Olding, 13. Luke Marshall, 14. Craig Gilroy, 15. Jared Payne.; Replacements: 16. Rob Herring (for Best 66'), 17. Callum Black (for Warwick 76'), 18. Rodney Ah You (for Herbst 66'), 19. Robbie Diack (for O'Connor 63'), 20. Nick Timoney (for Wilson 63'), 21. Paul Marshall, 22. Jacob Stockdale (for Payne 42'), 23. Andrew Trimble (for Gilroy 57').				Attendance: 15,752; Referee: Ian Davies (WRU)

15 April 2017	Munster (Ireland)	22–20	(Ireland) Ulster (1 BP)	Thomond Park, Limerick
15:00	Try: Lloyd 6' c Earls 61' m O'Callaghan 69' c Con: Keatley (1/1) 7'; Bleyendaal (1/2) 71'; Pen: Keatley (1/1) 36'	Report; Match centre Highlights	Try: Best 3' c L. Marshall 64' c Con: Jackson (2/2) 4', 65'; Pen: Jackson (2/3) 13', 52'	Attendance: 20,047; Referee: Marius Mitrea (FIR)
Ulster lineup: 1. Andrew Warwick, 2. Rory Best, 3. Wiehahn Herbst, 4. Kieran Treadwell, 5. Alan O'Connor, 6. Iain Henderson, 7. Chris Henry, 8. Sean Reidy, 9. Ruan Pienaar, 10. Paddy Jackson, 11. Charles Piutau, 12. Stuart Olding, 13. Luke Marshall, 14. Andrew Trimble, 15. Jacob Stockdale.; Replacements: 16. Rob Herring (for Best 51'), 17. Callum Black (for Warwick 63'), 18. Rodney Ah You (for Herbest 72'), 19. Robbie Diack (for Ross 70'), 20. Clive Ross (for Henry 28'), 21. Paul Marshall, 22. Stuart McCloskey (for Olding 51'), 23. Craig Gilroy (for Piutau 61').				Attendance: 20,047; Referee: Marius Mitrea (FIR)

29 April 2017	Ospreys (Wales)	24–10	(Ireland) Ulster	Liberty Stadium, Swansea
15:00	Try: Habberfield 8' c Ardron 40' c Leonard 79' c Con: Biggar (3/3) 9', 41', 79'; Pen: Biggar (1/1) 25'	Report; Match centre Highlights	Try: Stockdale 80' c Con: Jackson (1/1) 80'; Pen: Jackson (1/1) 19'	Attendance: 8,168; Referee: John Lacey (IRFU)
Ulster lineup: 1. Andrew Warwick, 2. Rory Best, 3. Wiehahn Herbst, 4. Kieran Treadwell, 5. Alan O'Connor, 6. Iain Henderson, 7. Sean Reidy, 8. Robbie Diack, 9. Ruan Pienaar, 10. Paddy Jackson, 11. Charles Piutau, 12. Stuart McCloskey, 13. Luke Marshall, 14. Andrew Trimble, 15. Craig Gilroy.; Replacements: 16. Rob Herring (for Best 65'), 17. Callum Black (for Warwick 55'), 18. Rodney Ah You (for Herbst 44'), 19. Franco van der Merwe (for O'Connor 77'), 20. Nick Timoney (for Diack 62'), 21. Paul Marshall, 22. Stuart Olding (for McCloskey 53'), 23. Jacob Stockdale (for Olding 55').				Attendance: 8,168; Referee: John Lacey (IRFU)

6 May 2017	Ulster (Ireland)	17–13	(Ireland) Leinster (1 BP)	Ravenhill Stadium, Belfast
17:15	Try: Wilson 9' c Trimble 55' c Con: Jackson (2/2) 10', 56'; Pen: Jackson (1/1) 41'	Report; Match centre Highlights	Try: Penalty try 62' c Con: Carbery (1/1) 62'; Pen: Carbery (2/2) 4', 23'	Attendance: 17,676; Referee: Andrew Brace (IRFU)
Ulster lineup: 1. Andrew Warwick, 2. Rob Herring, 3. Rodney Ah You, 4. Kieran Treadwell, 5. Alan O'Connor, 6. Robbie Diack, 7. Sean Reidy, 8. Roger Wilson, 9. Ruan Pienaar, 10. Paddy Jackson, 11. Charles Piutau, 12. Stuart McCloskey, 13. Luke Marshall, 14. Andrew Trimble, 15. Craig Gilroy.; Replacements: 16. John Andrew (for Herring 76'), 17. Kyle McCall (for Warwick 67'), 18. Ricky Lutton, 19. Chris Henry (for Reidy 53'), 20. Nick Timoney (for Treadwell 67'), 21. Paul Marshall (for Pienaar 70'), 22. Peter Nelson (for Piutau 59'), 23. Jacob Stockdale (for Gilroy 48').				Attendance: 17,676; Referee: Andrew Brace (IRFU)

=== End of season awards ===
Charles Piutau was named Players' Player of the Season, and the left winger on the Pro12 Dream Team.

== Home attendance ==
Domestic League					European Cup					Total	
League	Fixtures	Average Attendance	Highest	Lowest	League	Fixtures	Average Attendance	Highest	Lowest	Total Attendance	Average Attendance
2016–17 Pro12	11	15,961	17,676	13,663	2016–17 European Rugby Champions Cup	3	16,028	16,843	14,924	223,658	15,976

== Friendlies ==
1 June 2017	Ulster (Ireland)	28–43	Barbarians	Ravenhill Stadium, Belfast
19:30 IST (UTC+01)	Try: McCloskey 5' c Keane 10' c Patterson 34' c O'Connor 42' c Con: Wilson (1/1) 6'; Pienaar (2/2) 11', 35'; Herron (1/1) 43'	Report	Try: Flynn 19' m Nayacalevu (2) 23' c, 60' c King (2) 31' m, 39' m Penalty try 54' c Tekori 77' c Con: Agulla (1/3) 24'; Madigan (2/3) 54', 60'; Dusautoir (1/1) 78'	Attendance: 15,500; Referee: Ben Whitehouse (Wales)
Ulster lineup: 1. Andrew Warwick, 2. Rob Herring, 3. Rodney Ah You, 4. Alan O'Connor, 5. Peter Browne, 6. Matty Rea, 7. Clive Ross, 8. Roger Wilson, 9. Ruan Pienaar, 10. Brett Herron, 11. Craig Gilroy, 12. Stuart McCloskey, 13. Callum Patterson, 14. Mark Keane, 15. Peter Nelson.; Replacements: 16. John Andrew (for Herring 53'), 17. Kyle McCall (for Warwick 40'), 18. Ross Kane (for Lutton 58'), 19. Stephen Mulholland (for Wilson 53'), 20. Chris Henry (for O'Connor 58'), 21. Paul Marshall (for Pienaar 35'), 22. David Shanahan (for Nelson 60'), 23. Callum Smith (for Keane 66'), 24. Ricky Lutton (for Ah You 40')				Attendance: 15,500; Referee: Ben Whitehouse (Wales)

13 August 2016	Leinster (Ireland)	31-14	(Ireland) Ulster	Balreask Old, Navan
	Try: Leavy; Conan; Murphy; McFadden; A. Byrne; Con: R. Byrne		Try: M. Best; Lyttle; Con: Windsor; McPhillips
Ulster lineup: 1. Kyle McCall, 2. Jonny Murphy, 3. Jonny Simpson, 4. Alan O'Connor, 5. John Donnan, 6. Stephen Mulholland, 7. Nick Timoney, 8. Matty Rea, 9. David Shanahan, 10. Brett Herron, 11. Jacob Stockdale, 12. Sam Windsor, 13. Mark Best, 14. David Busby, 15. Louis Ludik.; Replacements: Andrew Warwick, John Andrew, Rodney Ah You, Clive Ross, Conall Boomer, Angus Lloyd, Johnny McPhillips, Rory Butler, Rob Lyttle, Andy McGrath, C. Smyth, C. Kelly, Alex Thompson, Aaron Cairns, Michael Lagan, Zack McCall

20 August 2016	Exeter Chiefs (England)	25-19	(Ireland) Ulster	Sandy Park, Exeter
	Try: Armand; Chudley; Welch; Penalty try Con: Slade; Pen: Slade	Report	Try: Stockdale; Lyttle (2); Con: (2)
Ulster lineup: 1. Callum Black, 2. Rob Herring (c), 3. Rodney Ah You, 4. Peter Browne, 5. Franco van der Merwe, 6. Robbie Diack, 7. Clive Ross, 8. Roger Wilson, 9. Ruan Pienaar, 10. Brett Herron, 11. Jacob Stockdale, 12. Stuart McCloskey, 13. Darren Cave, 14. Louis Ludik, 15. Charles Piutau.; Replacements: Andrew Warwick (for Black 30'), Paul Marshall (for Pienaar 40'), Jonny Simpson (for Ah You 49'), Kieran Treadwell (for Browne 49'), Matty Rea (for Wilson 51'), Kyle McCall (for Simpson 55'), Alan O'Connor (for Van der Merwe 58'), Johnny McPhillips (for Herron 59'), John Andrew (for Herring 59'), Stephen Mulholland (for Diack 60'), Sam Windsor (for Piutau 65'), David Busby (for Cave 65'), Rob Lyttle (for Stockdale 69')/

26 August 2016	Ulster (Ireland)	29-19	(England) Northampton Saints	Ravenhill Stadium, Belfast
	Try: Ludik; Piutau; Herring; Stockdale; Con: Lyttle (3); Pen: Lyttle	Report	Try: Walker; Collins; Estelles; Con: (2)
Ulster lineup: 1. Andrew Warwick, 2. Rob Herring (c), 3. Rodney Ah You, 4. Peter Browne, 5. Franco van der Merwe, 6. Robbie Diack, 7. Clive Ross, 8. Roger Wilson, 9. Paul Marshall, 10. Brett Herron, 11. Rob Lyttle, 12. Stuart McCloskey, 13. Louis Ludik, 14. Jacob Stockdale, 15. Charles Piutau.; Replacements: John Andrew, Callum Black, Ross Kane, Alan O'Connor, Conor Joyce, Matty Rea, David Shanahan, Sam Windsor, David Busby.

== Ulster Women ==
=== 2016-17 Women's Interprovincial Series ===
	Team	P	W	D	L	PF	PA	BP	Pts
1	Leinster	3	2	0	1	72	20	1	9
2	Connacht	3	2	0	1	55	29	1	9
3	Munster	3	2	0	1	40	32	0	8
4	Ulster	3	0	0	3	15	101	0	0

3 December 2016	Ulster	3-16	Munster	Ravenhill Stadium, Belfast

10 December 2016	Leinster	46-0	Ulster	Donnybrook Stadium, Dublin

17 December 2016	Connacht	39-12	Ulster	Corinthian Park, Galway

== Ulster Rugby Awards ==
The Heineken Ulster Rugby Awards ceremony was held at Aquinas Diocesan Grammar School, Belfast, on 6 May 2017. Winners were:

- Bank of Ireland Ulster Player of the Year: Charles Piutau
- Heineken Ulster Rugby Personality of the Year: Ruan Pienaar
- BT Young Player of the Year: Jacob Stockdale
- Rugby Writers Player of the Year: Sean Reidy
- Ulster Rugby Supporters Club Player of the Year: Ruan Pienaar
- Abbey Insurance Academy Player of the Year: Ross Kane

Roger Wilson was given a special award for retiring as the province's most capped player, with 221 appearances. Honours caps were awarded for appearance milestones to Tommy Bowe (150), Chris Henry (150), Luke Marshall (100) and Rob Herring (100).

The Danske Bank Schools Player of the Year was won by Michael Lowry of RBAI, beating nominees James Hume (RBAI) and Stewart Moore (Ballymena Academy).

== Season reviews ==
- Ulster Rugby: Who did what 2016 – 2017, The Front Row Union, 17 May 2017
