= Kieran Treadwell =

Ireland international rugby union player

- Full name: Kieran Paul Treadwell
- Born: 6 November 1995 (age 31) Carshalton, England
- Height: 1.98 m (6 ft 6 in)
- Weight: 115 kg (254 lb; 18 st 2 lb)
- School: The John Fisher School

Rugby union career
- Position(s): Lock, Flanker
- Current team: Harlequins
Senior career
Years	Team	Apps	(Points)
2014–2016	Harlequins	7	(0)
2015–2016	→ London Scottish (D/R)	7	(0)
2016–2025	Ulster	179	(35)
2025–	Harlequins	22	(20)
- Correct as of 6 June 2026
International career
Years	Team	Apps	(Points)
2013	Ireland U18	4	(0)
2015	England U20	9	(0)
2017–	Ireland	11	(5)
- Correct as of 18 March 2023

Kieran Paul Treadwell (born 6 November 1995) is a professional rugby union player who plays as a lock and flanker for Prem Rugby club Harlequins. Born in England, he represents Ireland at international level after qualifying on ancestry grounds.

== Professional career ==
Born in Sutton, south London, he attended The John Fisher School. His mother is Irish, and he represented Ireland at under-18 level. He joined the Harlequins academy ahead of the 2014–15 season, and made his senior debut for the club in 2014. He had a dual registration deal with London Scottish, for whom he played in the 2015–16 British and Irish Cup. He played for England at under-20 level, and was part of the team that won the 2015 Six Nations Under 20s Championship.

He moved to Ulster ahead of the 2016–17 season. He played regularly in his first season, thanks to the absence of Alan O'Connor and Peter Browne with injuries, and the departure of Dan Tuohy to Bristol Bears, making 21 starts and winning 47 lineouts. He was named by Joe Schmidt in the Ireland squad for their 2017 Summer Tour. In 2017–18 he made 23 appearances, including 19 starts, and made 155 tackles. In 2018–19 he established himself in the team alongside Iain Henderson, making 28 appearances including 22 starts, and 235 tackles. In 2019–20 he made 19 appearances, including 11 starts.

In 2020–21 he made 18 appearances, including 13 starts, and 149 tackles, and made his 100th appearance for the province in February 2021. Having not made an appearance for Ireland since 2017, he was called up for the 2022 Six Nations Championship, and scored his first international try for Ireland in a 57–6 win over Italy. In the 2022 tour of New Zealand which Ireland won, Treadwell played in all three tests, and in both non-test matches against the Maori All Blacks. In the 2023 Six Nations Treadwell helped Ireland win a Grand Slam by playing against his country of birth, England. He made his 150th appearance for Ulster against Connacht in December 2023.

In January 2025 it was announced that Treadwell would return to his original club Harlequins. Treadwell cited that the unfinished business he felt he had with the club after never having appeared for them in the Premiership, and a want to be near to his family again as his primary reasons for the surprise return to the club.

== Career statistics ==
=== List of international tries ===
Number	Position	Points	Tries	Result	Opposition	Venue	Date	Ref.
1	Lock	5	1	Won	Italy	Aviva Stadium	27 February 2022	

as of 1 March 2022
