= Adam McBurney =

Irish rugby union player

- Born: 5 September 1996 (age 30) Ballymena, Northern Ireland
- Height: 1.83 m (6 ft 0 in)
- Weight: 103 kg (16.2 st; 227 lb)

Rugby union career
- Position: Hooker
Senior career
Years	Team	Apps	(Points)
2017–2021	Ulster	42	(50)
2021–2024	Edinburgh	24	(30)
2024	→ Gloucester (loan)	3	(5)
2024-2025	Connacht	1	(5)
2025-	CS Dinamo București		
- Correct as of 30 March 2025
International career
Years	Team	Apps	(Points)
2015–2016	Ireland U20	17	(20)
- Correct as of 30 May 2022

Adam McBurney (born 5 September 1996) is an Irish rugby union player who currently plays for Edinburgh Rugby in the United Rugby Championship.

He started playing with Randalstown RFC at about eight years old, and was named Youth Player of the Season in the 2014 Ulster Rugby Awards. He was selected for the Ulster under-18 team, and from there was selected for Ireland at under-18 and under-20 level, appearing at the 2016 Under-20 World Championship. He played club rugby for Ballymena R.F.C. in the All-Ireland League. He joined the Ulster academy ahead of the 2016–17 season. He made his senior debut for Ulster on 30 September 2017 in round 5 of the 2017–18 Pro14, featuring off the bench in the provinces 27–23 loss against Italian side Zebre. He played four seasons with Ulster, vying with John Andrew for the second-choice hooker spot behind Rob Herring.

McBurney, who is Scottish-qualified through his grandmother, signed with Edinburgh in March 2021. He returned to Ireland with Connacht in 2024. He moved to CS Dinamo București in March 2025.
