= Ross Kane =

Northern Irish rugby union player

- Born: Ross Kane; 14 October 1994 (age 32) Bangor, County Down, Northern Ireland
- Height: 1.8 m (5 ft 11 in)
- Weight: 118 kg (18 st 8 lb)
- School: Methodist College Belfast
- University: Queen's University Belfast

Rugby union career
- Position: Prop
- Current team: Ulster
Amateur team(s)
Years	Team	Apps	(Points)
2013–	Ballymena		
Senior career
Years	Team	Apps	(Points)
2016–2022	Ulster	59	(0)
2022-2024	Ealing Trailfinders	18	(0)
- Correct as of 6 August 2024

Ross Kane (born 14 October 1994) is a professional rugby union player from Northern Ireland, who played at tighthead prop for Ulster and Ealing Trailfinders.

A native of Bangor, County Down, he started playing mini rugby with Donaghadee Rugby Club. At schools level, he captained Methodist College Belfast to victory in the Ulster Schools' Cup in 2013. He was part of Ulster's sub-academy system until he joined the province's academy ahead of the 2015–16 season, while playing club rugby with Ballymena R.F.C.

He made his senior debut for Ulster in 2016 against Newport Gwent Dragons, making ten appearances, including three starts, in the 2016–17 season, and was named Academy Player of the Year in the 2017 Ulster Rugby Awards. He was part of the Ireland Under-20 squad for the 2017 Under-20 Six Nations. He was named in Ulster's senior squad for the 2017–18 season. the arrival of Marty Moore and the emergence of Tom O'Toole limited his opportunities, but he made his 50th appearance for the province in March 2021. He moved to Ealing Trailfinders at the end of the 2021–22 season. he left Ealing at the end of the 2023-24 season.
