= Jacob Stockdale =

Ireland international rugby union player

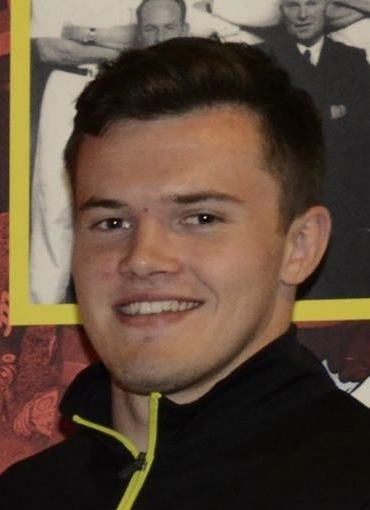
- Stockdale representing Ulster
- Full name: Jacob Alexander Stockdale
- Born: 3 April 1996 (age 30) Newtownstewart, Northern Ireland
- Height: 1.91 m (6 ft 3 in)
- Weight: 110 kg (243 lb; 17 st 5 lb)
- School: Wallace High School

Rugby union career
- Position(s): Wing, Fullback
- Current team: Ulster
Senior career
Years	Team	Apps	(Points)
2016–	Ulster	152	(270)
- Correct as of 24 October 2026
International career
Years	Team	Apps	(Points)
2015–2016	Ireland U20	13	(50)
2017–	Ireland	43	(100)
2022	Ireland Wolfhounds	1	(0)
- Correct as of 11 July 2026

Jacob Alexander Stockdale (born 3 April 1996) is an Irish professional rugby union player who plays as a wing for United Rugby Championship club Ulster and the Ireland national team.

From 2018 to 2025 he held the record for tries scored in a single Six Nations Championship, scoring seven tries for Ireland in the 2018 tournament, for which he was also named Player of the Championship. The record was eventually beaten by Louis Bielle-Biarrey's eight tries in the 2025 tournament. He won the Nevin Spence Irish Young Player of the Year award in 2018, and was nominated for EPCR European Player of the Year in 2019.

== Early life ==
He was born in Newtownstewart in County Tyrone before his family settled in Lurgan. He grew up idolising Tommy Bowe and Jonah Lomu. He attended Wallace High School in Lisburn, where he played in the back row before moving to centre. He played for the school's first team in his final year, was selected for Ireland at Schools and under-18 level, and was named Ulster Schools Player of the Year in the 2014 Ulster Rugby Awards.

Stockdale is a Christian (his father is a Presbyterian minister) and prays before each game.

Stockdale has been married to Hannah since 2021 and they have two daughters, Phoebe and Bonnie.

== Professional career ==
Stockdale joined the Ulster academy ahead of the 2014–15 season, while studying criminology at Ulster University at Jordanstown. He moved to wing from centre because of Ulster having strength in depth at that position. He made his senior debut for Ulster against Benetton in January 2016, making six appearances, including five starts, in the 2015–16 season, and was selected for Ireland under-20s in the 2016 under-20 Six Nations and the 2016 under-20 World Championship. In the 2016–17 season he made 20 appearances including eight starts, and scored nine tries. At the end of the season he was named Ulster's Young Player of the Year. He was named in the Ireland squad for the 2017 Summer Tour, and made his international debut against the United States.

In 2017–18 he made 19 appearances for Ulster, including 18 starts, and scored ten tries. He played his first home game for Ireland in November 2017, against South Africa where he scored a try. Two weeks later in the same November series he won "man of the match" after scoring two tries in Ireland's 28–19 victory over Argentina. He was named Player of the Championship in the 2018 Six Nations Championship, after setting a tournament record for most tries scored with seven as Ireland won the Grand Slam. He was awarded the Nevin Spence Young Player of the Year award by Rugby Players Ireland in May 2018, and won BBC Northern Ireland Sports Personality of the Year in December 2018.

In 2018–19 he made twelve appearances for Ulster, including eleven starts, and scored seven tries. He was nominated for EPCR European Player of the Year in 2019. For Ireland, he won eleven caps, including five in the 2019 Six Nations Championship and four at the 2019 Rugby World Cup, and scored three tries, including one in Ireland's first ever victory against the All Blacks on Irish soil,

In 2019–20 he made 13 appearances, all starts, for Ulster, and scored two tries. For Ireland, he won five caps in the 2020 Six Nations Championship. In 2020-21 he made 14 appearances, all starts, for Ulster, and scored three tries. For Ireland, he won five caps three in the 2020 Autumn Nations Cup, one in the 2021 Six Nations Championship, and one against Japan in July 2021. In 2021–22, he injured his ankle in Ulster's opening United Rugby Championship match against Glasgow Warriors, which kept him out for the rest of the season, eventually requiring surgery in January 2022. He made his 100th appearance for Ulster at the end of the 2022–23 season. He was called up to Ireland's preliminary 42-man squad ahead of the 2023 Rugby World Cup, and made his first international start since 2021 against Italy on 5 August 2023. He was called up to the Ireland squad for their two-match tour of South Africa in July 2024. On 5 February 2026, Stockdale started his first Six Nations Championship match in close to five years when he named in the team to play France.

== Career statistics ==
=== List of international tries ===
Number	Position	Points	Tries	Result	Opposition	Venue	Date	Ref.
1	Wing	5	1	Won	United States	Red Bull Arena	10 June 2017	
2	Wing	5	1	Won	South Africa	Aviva Stadium	11 November 2017	
3–4	Wing	10	2	Won	Argentina	Aviva Stadium	25 November 2017	
5–6	Wing	10	2	Won	Italy	Aviva Stadium	10 February 2018	
7–8	Wing	10	2	Won	Wales	Aviva Stadium	24 February 2018	
9–10	Wing	10	2	Won	Scotland	Aviva Stadium	10 March 2018	
11	Wing	5	1	Won	England	Twickenham Stadium	17 March 2018	
12	Wing	5	1	Won	New Zealand	Aviva Stadium	17 November 2018	
13	Wing	5	1	Won	Scotland	Murrayfield	9 February 2019	
14	Wing	5	1	Won	Italy	Rome	24 February 2019	
15–16	Wing	10	2	Won	Wales	Millennium Stadium	31 August 2019	
17	Fullback	5	1	Lost	France	Aviva Stadium	31 October 2020	
18	Wing	5	1	Lost	England	Twickenham Stadium	21 November 2020	
19	Wing	5	1	Won	Japan	Aviva Stadium	3 July 2021	

as of 3 July 2021

== Honours ==
Ireland

- 1× Six Nations Championship: 2018
- 1× Grand Slam: 2018
- 1× Triple Crown: 2018

Individual

- 1× Ulster Schools Player of the Year: 2014
- 1× Ulster Young Player of the Year: 2017
- 1× Six Nations Player of the Championship: 2018
- 1× BBC Northern Ireland Sports Personality of the Year: 2018
- 1× EPCR European Player of the Year nominee: 2019
