= Mark Best (rugby union) =

Irish rugby union player

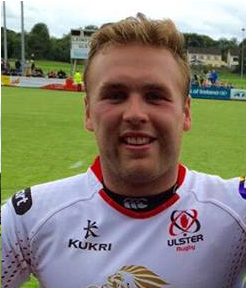
- Born: Mark Best; 1 April 1994 (age 32) Belfast, Northern Ireland
- Height: 1.81 m (5 ft 11 in)
- Weight: 95 kg (209 lb; 14 st 13 lb)

Rugby union career
- Position: Centre/Fly-half
Amateur team(s)
Years	Team	Apps	(Points)
- Belfast Harlequins
- Ballymena
2022–	Ballynahinch		
Senior career
Years	Team	Apps	(Points)
2015–2017	Ulster	0	(0)
2017–2020	Jersey Reds	1	(1)
2020–2022	Doncaster Knights	0	(0)
- Correct as of 28 January 2021
International career
Years	Team	Apps	(Points)
2012–2013	Ireland U18s		
- Correct as of 28 January 2021

Mark Best (born 1 April 1994) is an Irish Rugby union player

He originally played for Belfast Harlequins in Division 2B in the All Ireland League. Best was part of the Ulster Rugby Academy system and started the 2016/17 season on a development contract with the Ulster senior squad. Best has been part of the Ulster set-up from under 18 level, at which age group he also played for Ireland.

He was a regular feature in the Irish province's British and Irish Cup campaigns over two seasons and captaining Ulster 'A'. He played domestic rugby for Ballymena in the All-Ireland League when not used by Ulster.

On 3 May 2017, Best left Ireland to join Channel Island based Jersey Reds in the English RFU Championship from the 2017–18 season. He made his first team debut for Jersey against Doncaster Knights in the Championship opener in September 2017. On 2 June 2020, He left Jersey to join Championship rivals Doncaster Knights from the 2020–21 season. He retired from professional rugby at the end of the 2022-23 season and returned to Northern Ireland, working as a building surveyor and playing and coaching at an amateur level with Ballynahinch.
