= Rob Herring (rugby union) =

Irish rugby union player

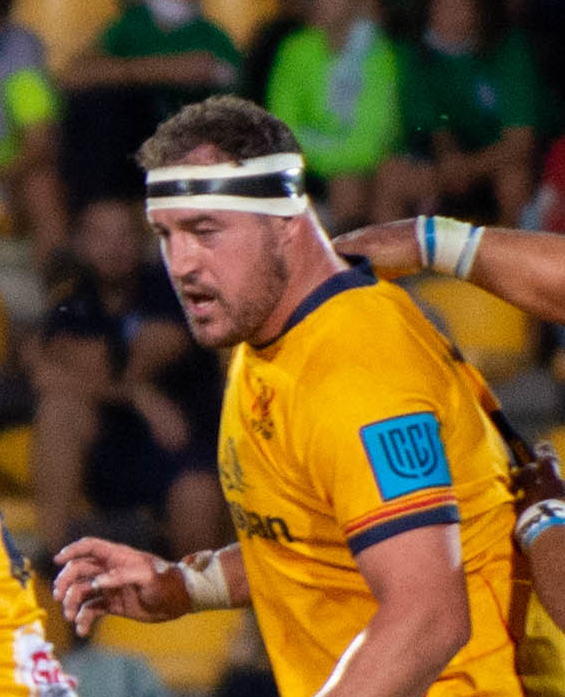
- Herring representing Ulster during the United Rugby Championship
- Full name: Robert Patrick Herring
- Born: 27 April 1990 (age 36) Cape Town, South Africa
- Height: 1.84 m (6 ft 0 in)
- Weight: 108 kg (238 lb; 17 st 0 lb)
- School: South African College Schools

Rugby union career
- Position: Hooker
- Current team: Ulster
Senior career
Years	Team	Apps	(Points)
2009–2011	London Irish	5	(0)
2009–2010	→ Blackheath (loan)	8	(0)
2011	→ London Welsh (loan)	4	(5)
2012	Western Province	2	(0)
2012–	Ulster	270	(225)
- Correct as of 31 October 2026
International career
Years	Team	Apps	(Points)
2013-15	Emerging Ireland	6	(0)
2014–2015	Ireland Wolfhounds	2	(0)
2014–	Ireland	43	(30)
- Correct as of 8 March 2025

Robert Patrick Herring (born 27 April 1990) is a professional rugby union player who plays as a hooker for United Rugby Championship club Ulster. Born in South Africa, he represents Ireland at international level after qualifying on ancestry grounds. He is Ulster's record appearance holder.

== Club career ==
Born in Cape Town, South Africa, Herring hails from one of South Africa's oldest and well known schools, South African College Schools (SACS). He joined London Irish academy in 2009, and made his senior debut for the team in 2010, but was not offered a senior contract, and returned to South Africa to continue his studies. He played for Western Province's under-21 team, and appeared in the Varsity Cup for Stellenbosch University.

On the basis of these performances, both Ulster and Connacht showed interest, aware he qualified to play for Ireland through his Irish grandparents. Both teams offered him a two-year development contract, but Herring asked for a six-month trial so he could continue his studies if it didn't work out, and Ulster agreed. He signed for Ulster ahead of the 2012–13 season. Initially used as a backup to team captain Rory Best, he got first-team opportunities when Best was on Ireland duty. He was named captain in Best's absence during the 2015 Rugby World Cup, and shared the captaincy with Andrew Trimble during the 2016–17 season after Best stepped down from the role. He made his 100th appearance for the province in September 2016.

Since Best's retirement in 2019, Herring has been Ulster's first choice hooker. He made his 200th appearance for Ulster in October 2021. He equalled the Ulster appearance record at 229, alongside Andrew Trimble and Darren Cave, at the end of the 2022–23 season, and became the province's most capped player when he came off the bench against Munster the following season.

== International career ==
In January 2014, Herring was included in the provisional 44 man Ireland squad for the 2014 Six Nations Championship. He made his debut for Ireland in June 2014 coming off the bench in a tour match against Argentina. On 16 October 2019, Herring was called into the Ireland squad for the 2019 Rugby World Cup to replace the injured Seán Cronin. He started all five of Ireland's matches in the 2020 Six Nations Championship. He scored a try in the third test against the All Blacks in July 2022, helping Ireland secure a historic series win in New Zealand. He was named in Ireland's 2023 Six Nations Championship squad and went on to score a try in the final match vs. England, as Ireland won the Grand Slam and Triple crown. Herring represented Ireland at the 2023 Rugby World Cup, where he scored two tries in the pool stage against Romania and Tonga. He was called up to the Ireland squad for their two-match tour of South Africa in July 2024.

== Honours ==
Ireland

- 1x Six Nations Championship:2023
- 1× Grand Slam: 2023
- 2× Triple Crown: 2022, 2023
