= Louis Ludik =

South African rugby union footballer

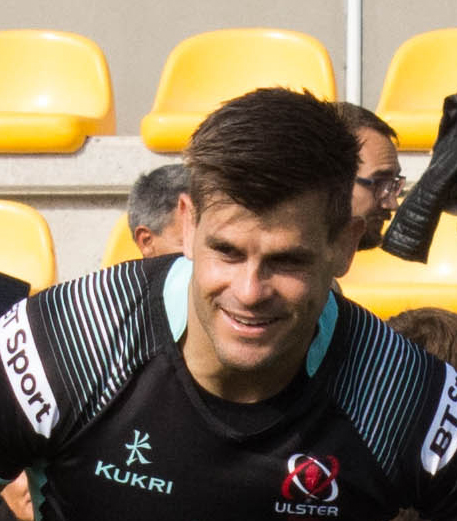
- Born: Louis Ludik; 8 October 1986 (age 40) Kempton Park, South Africa
- Height: 1.83 m (6 ft 0 in)
- Weight: 89 kg (14 st 0 lb)
- School: EG Jansen Hoërskool

Rugby union career
- Position: Full-back / Wing
Senior career
Years	Team	Apps	(Points)
2013–14	Agen	20	(22)
Provincial / State sides
Years	Team	Apps	(Points)
2006–09	Golden Lions	58	(85)
2010–13	Sharks (Currie Cup)	37	(35)
2014–2021	Ulster Rugby	112	(65)
- Correct as of 28 March 2021
Super Rugby
Years	Team	Apps	(Points)
2007–09	Lions	36	(20)
2011–13	Sharks	48	(40)
- Correct as of 26 October 2013

Louis Ludik (born 8 October 1986) is a South African rugby union player who played for Ulster Rugby at full-back. Ludik played over 70 times in Super Rugby before moving to Agen in France in 2013. After one season with the French club he signed a 2-year deal with Ulster in May 2014.

He announced his retirement on 27 May 2021.
