= Johnny McPhillips =

English rugby union player

- Born: John McPhillips; 13 March 1997 (age 29) Newcastle upon Tyne, England
- Height: 1.80 m (5 ft 11 in)
- Weight: 89 kg (14 st 0 lb)
- School: Sedbergh School

Rugby union career
- Position: Fly-half
- Current team: Kintetsu Liners
Youth career
- ????: Newcastle Falcons
Amateur team(s)
Years	Team	Apps	(Points)
2015-2016	Queen's University		
2016-2019	Ballynahinch		
Senior career
Years	Team	Apps	(Points)
2017–2019	Ulster	27	(34)
2019–2021	Leicester Tigers	25	(71)
2021–2026	US Carcassonne	50	(349)
2022–2024	Provence	24	(40)
2026–	Kintetsu Liners		
- Correct as of 17 August 2021
International career
Years	Team	Apps	(Points)
2015	England U18		
2016-2017	Ireland U20	11	(83)
- Correct as of 10 February 2017

Johnny McPhillips (born 13 April 1997) is a professional rugby union player who plays for US Carcassonne in France's Pro D2, the second division. Between 2019 and 2021 he played 21 times for Leicester Tigers and between 2017 and 2019 he made 22 appearances for Ulster.. He represented Ireland U20 as fly-half as the side made the Junior World Cup Final in 2016. Il devient champion de France de nationale avec l'US Carcassonne le 17 mai 2025 après avoir transformé l'essai dans les arrêts de jeu. Victoire 24 a 23 face à Chambéry.

== Career ==
McPhillips was born in Newcastle upon Tyne, England, and was a pupil at Sedbergh School. McPhilips signed for Ulster in 2016. After four appearances from the bench, he scored his first try on his first start on 9 February 2018.

On 21 June 2019 McPhillips returned to England and signed for Leicester Tigers. He played 21 times for the club over his two years, scoring 71 points. On 10 June 2021 his signing was announced by US Carcassonne. En mai 2025, il devient Champion de France de Nationale 1 avec U.S.Carcassonne et fait monter le club en Pro D2 en transformant à la derniére minute l'essai du talonneur Carbou.
