= Rob Lyttle =

Robert Lyttle
- Born: Robert Lyttle; 28 January 1997 (age 29) Donaghcloney, Northern Ireland
- Height: 1.75 m (5 ft 9 in)
- Weight: 86 kg (13 st 8 lb)
- School: Royal Belfast Academical Institution; Methodist College Belfast

Rugby union career
- Position: Wing
- Current team: Ulster
Amateur team(s)
Years	Team	Apps	(Points)
2015-17	Queen's University		
2017-	Banbridge		
Senior career
Years	Team	Apps	(Points)
2016–2023, 2025	Ulster	66	(108)
- Correct as of 26 January 2025
International career
Years	Team	Apps	(Points)
2017	Ireland U20	1	(0)
- Correct as of 28 February 2017

Rob Lyttle (born 28 January 1997) is a rugby union player from Donaghcloney, County Down, Northern Ireland. He plays wing for Banbridge RFC and Ulster.

Born in Donaghcloney, County Down, he played mini rugby at Dromore RFC as a child. He attended Royal Belfast Academical Institution, where he appeared in the Ulster Schools' Cup final in 2013. He then moved to Methodist College Belfast, with whom he made the Schools' Cup semi-finals. He was named Ulster Rugby Schools Player of the Year in 2015. He was signed to the Ulster academy. He made his senior debut, scoring two tries, against the Dragons in September 2016. He made his fiftieth appearance against Scarlets in January 2022. In April 2023 he announced he would be leaving Ulster at the end of the 2022-23 season.

He returned to the Ulster squad in January 2025 as short-term injury cover, and was named on the bench for Ulster's home Champions Cup tie against Exeter Chiefs.
