= David Busby =

Irish rugby union player

- Born: 3 February 1994 (age 32) Portadown, Northern Ireland
- Height: 1.83 m (6 ft 0 in)
- Weight: 90 kg (14 st; 200 lb)
- School: Portadown College
- University: Queen's University

Rugby union career
- Position(s): Wing, Fullback
Senior career
Years	Team	Apps	(Points)
2020–	Seattle Seawolves	18	(17)
- Correct as of 12 August 2024
Provincial / State sides
Years	Team	Apps	(Points)
2017–2019	Ulster	5	(5)
- Correct as of 20 May 2018

David Busby (born 3 February 1994) is an Irish rugby union player, currently playing for the Seattle Seawolves in Major League Rugby. He plays as a wing or fullback.

Busby was born in Portadown, Northern Ireland and attended Portadown College and Queen's University. He made his senior Ulster debut on 21 February 2017 in round 16 of the 2016–17 Pro12, featuring off the bench and scoring a try in the provinces 40–17 away win against Italian side Zebre. He joined the Seattle Seawolves for the 2020 Major League Rugby season.
