= Ricky Lutton =

Irish rugby union player

- Born: 26 February 1986 (age 40) Belfast, County Antrim, Northern Ireland
- Height: 6 ft 1 in (185 cm)
- Weight: 133 kg (293 lb)

Rugby union career
- Position: Prop
- Current team: Ulster
Amateur team(s)
Years	Team	Apps	(Points)
- Ballyclare RFC
Senior career
Years	Team	Apps	(Points)
2012-2017	Ulster	29	(30)
- Correct as of 10 Feb 2015
International career
Years	Team	Apps	(Points)
2013-14	Emerging Ireland	3	(0)
- Correct as of 10 Feb 2015

Ricky Lutton (born 26 February 1986) from Belfast is a rugby union player, who formerly played prop for Ulster.

== Ulster ==
Lutton, who is a tight head prop but can also play loose head, returned to play for Belfast Harlequins in 2011 after a spell playing in Canterbury, New Zealand. His impressive club form resulted in him not only gaining representative honours with the Ravens, but concluded with him being awarded 'Club Player of the Year' at the Heineken Ulster Rugby Awards in May 2012.

Lutton is an excellent scrummager and is also highly capable with ball in hand. He earned a development contract with Ulster at the beginning of the 2012/13 season. His first appearance came against Edinburgh and his first start against Leinster, taking a vital role in a famous win for the province. He was selected for the Emerging Ireland team to play in the Emerging Nations Cup in Bucharest and was rewarded with 3 appearances in the competition.

Lutton continued with Ulster in the 2013/14 season amassing 25 caps and was rewarded with a new 2 year senior contract in March 2014. Lutton was again selected to represent Emerging Ireland, this time in Bucharest and was involved in 2 matches as the Emerging Ireland team lifted the trophy.

He retired at the end of the 2016/17 season and is now playing club rugby for Ballyclare RFC.
