= Brett Herron (rugby union) =

South African rugby union player

- Born: Brett Herron; 13 November 1995 (age 31) Johannesburg, South Africa
- Height: 1.83 m (6 ft 0 in)
- Weight: 90 kg (14 st 2 lb)
- School: Wellington College, Berkshire

Rugby union career
- Position: Fly-half
- Current team: Biarritz Olympique
Youth career
- Bath
Amateur team(s)
Years	Team	Apps	(Points)
2016–2018	Ballymena		
Senior career
Years	Team	Apps	(Points)
2016–2018	Ulster	8	(2)
2018–2019	Jersey Reds	10	(5)
2019-2021	Harlequins	21	(82)
2021-2023	Biarritz Olympique	24	(168)
2023-	Colomiers	21	(101)
- Correct as of 12 August 2024
International career
Years	Team	Apps	(Points)
2013	England U18		

Brett Herron (born 13 November 1995) is an English professional rugby union player who currently plays for Colomiers in the Pro D2.

Herron signed for Ulster from Bath in 2016. On 9 March 2018, Herron left Ulster to join Jersey Reds in the RFU Championship from the 2018–19 season.

On 22 March 2019, Herron returned to the Gallagher Premiership to sign for Harlequins from the 2019–20 season.

In 2021, he signs for Biarritz olympique in Top 14.
