= Peter Browne (rugby union) =

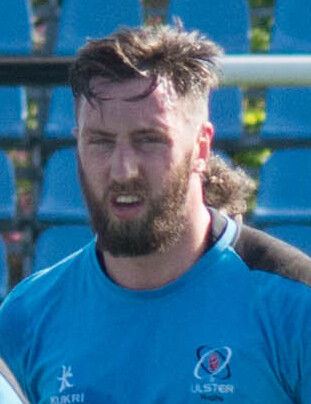
- Browne in 2016
- Born: Peter Browne; 25 October 1987 (age 39) Bristol, England
- Height: 1.95 m (6 ft 5 in)
- Weight: 111 kg (17 st 7 lb; 245 lb)
- School: Dean Close School
- University: Durham University

Rugby union career
- Position: Lock / Flanker
Senior career
Years	Team	Apps	(Points)
2007–2010	Newcastle Falcons	27	(0)
2010–2013	Harlequins	31	(0)
2013–2015	London Welsh	23	(10)
2015–2018	Ulster	22	(10)
- Correct as of 14 Nov 2016

Peter Browne (born 25 October 1987) is a former professional rugby union player who played lock and back row for Newcastle Falcons, Harlequins, London Welsh and Ulster from 2007 to 2018.

Capped by England at student level, he was also eligible to play for Ireland through his father, Rev. Leonard Browne, who was previously the Headmaster of Dean Close Preparatory School, and had represented Ulster and Ireland at rugby at schools level in the 1970s. Browne was born in Bristol, and was educated at Dean Close School, Cheltenham. He gained a place in the Gloucester academy, before studying theology at Durham University. In 2008, in his second year at Durham, he made his debut for Newcastle Falcons.

After three seasons with Newcastle, he joined Harlequins in 2010. During his three seasons there the team won the 2010–11 European Challenge Cup, the 2011–12 Premiership and the 2012–13 LV Cup. He then moved to London Welsh, where he helped get them get promoted to the Premiership before being relegated again to the Championship. He signed for Ulster in 2015, and played three seasons there, before retiring in 2018 on medical advice following a series of concussions. Since retiring, he has worked for Christians in Sport as their rugby lead and as a member of their international team.
