= 2009–10 Ulster Rugby season =

Provincial professional playing season

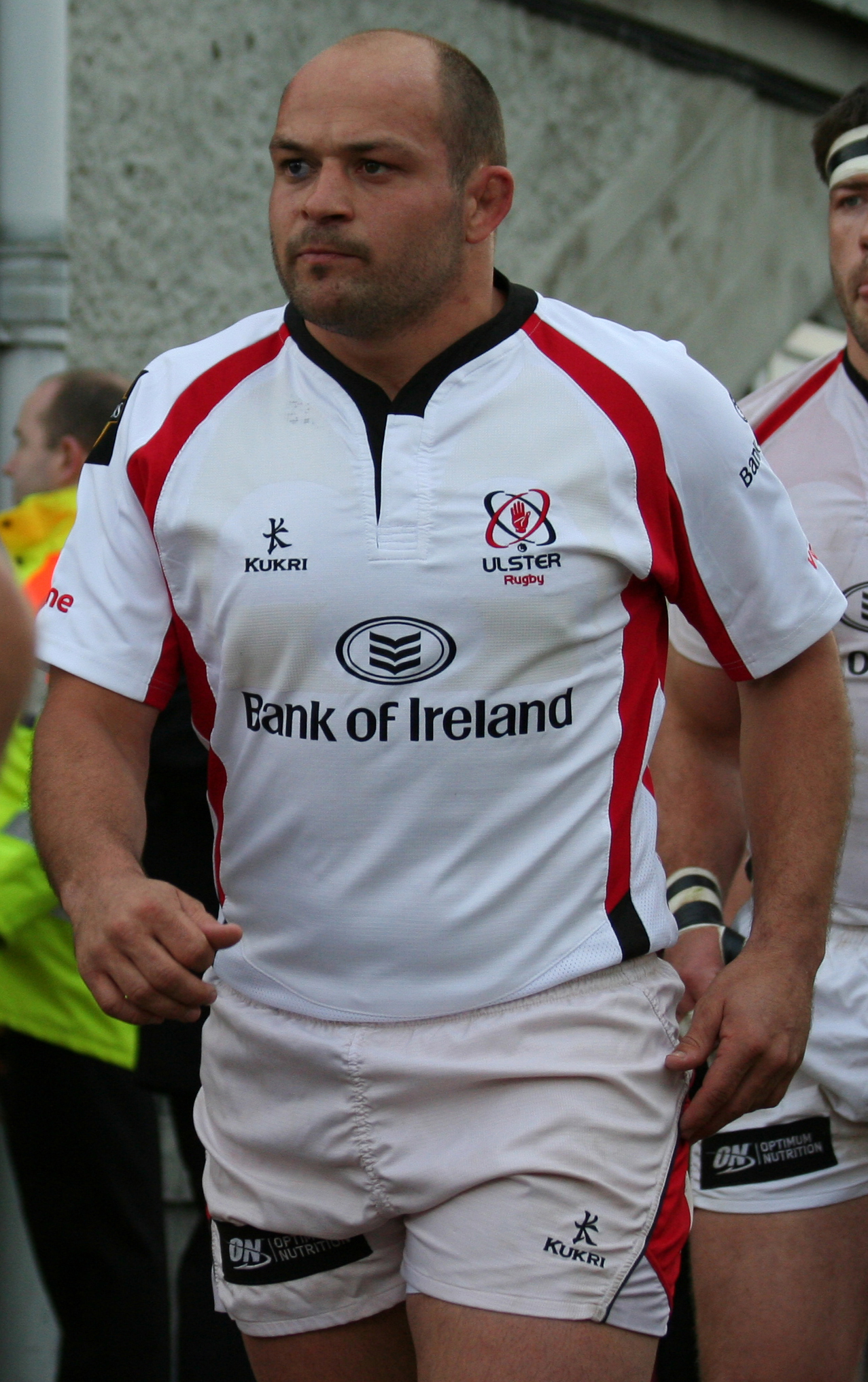
- Rory Best vs Ospreys, Ravenhill, 13 April 2020
- Ground: Ravenhill Stadium (Capacity: 12,500)
- Coach(es): David Humphreys (Director of Rugby); Brian McLaughlin (Head Coach)
- Captain: Rory Best
- Top scorer: Ian Humphreys (177)
- Most tries: Simon Danielli (9)
- League(s): Heineken Cup (2nd in pool); Celtic League (8th)
1st kit	2nd kit

The 2009–10 Ulster Rugby season was Ulster's 16th season since the advent of professionalism in rugby union, and their first under director of rugby David Humphreys and head coach Brian McLaughlin.

Following the departure of previous head coach Matt Williams, Ulster put a new management structure in place. David Humphreys was director of rugby, with overall responsibility for the senior team, the Ulster 'A' team (renamed the Ulster Ravens), the Ulster under-20s and the academy; and Brian McLaughlin was head coach, assisted by forwards coaches Jeremy Davidson and Peter Sharp, and backs coach Neil Doak. However, Ulster couldn't afford to retain Sharp, and he left in September 2009.

Chief Executive Michael Reid announced he was stepping down in September 2009 after twelve years in the job. Shane Logan was appointed as his replacement in early 2010.

They finished second in their Heineken Cup pool, failing to qualify for the knockout stage, and 8th in the Celtic League. Chris Henry was Ulster's Player of the Year. Andrew Trimble won the IRUPA award for Try of the Year.

== Staff ==
Position	Name	Nationality
Chief Executive Officer	Michael Reid, Shane Logan	Ireland
Director of Rugby	David Humphreys	Ireland
Head coach	Brian McLaughlin	Ireland
Forwards Coach	Jeremy Davidson	Ireland
Defence Coach	Peter Sharp	Australia
Skills Coach	Neil Doak	Ireland

== Squad ==
=== Senior squad ===
==== Players in (Season 2009/2010) ====
- (Ireland) Ali Birch from (Ireland) Dungannon
- (Australia) Tamaiti Horua from (Australia) Western Force
- (Ireland) Andi Kyriacou from (England) Saracens
- (Ireland) Dan Tuohy from (England) Exeter Chiefs

==== Promoted from academy ====
- (Ireland) Willie Faloon
- (Ireland) Ian Whitten

==== Players Out (Season 2009/2010) ====
- (Ireland) Jarlath Carey released
- (Ireland) Kieron Dawson retired
- (Italy) Carlo Del Fava to (Italy) Rugby Viadana
- (Scotland) Rob Dewey to (Scotland) Glasgow Warriors
- (Ireland) Neil Hanna released
- (Ireland) Seamus Mallon released
- (Ireland) Paul McKenzie to (England) Exeter Chiefs
- (New Zealand) Filo Paulo to (New Zealand) North Harbour
- (Ireland) Stuart Philpott released
- (Australia) Daniel Roach released
- (New Zealand) Paul Steinmetz retired

Ulster Rugby squad
**Props**: (Ireland) **Tom Court** (18 apps, 17 starts, 5 pts); (South Africa) **BJ Botha** (22 apps, 11 starts, 5 pts); (Ireland) **Bryan Young** (19 apps, 6 starts); (Ireland) Declan Fitzpatrick (17 apps, 4 starts); (Ireland) **Justin Fitzpatrick** (1 app); **Hookers**: (Ireland) Nigel Brady (19 apps, 10 starts, 5 pts); (Ireland) Andi Kyriacou (20 apps, 8 starts, 5 pts); (Ireland) **Rory Best** (c) (6 apps, 6 starts); **Locks**: (Ireland) Ed O'Donoghue (23 apps, 20 starts); (Ireland) Dan Tuohy (20 apps, 17 starts, 10 pts); (Ireland) **Ryan Caldwell** (17 apps, 11 starts); (Ireland) Neil McComb (4 apps, 1 start); (Ireland) **Matt McCullough** (no apps)	**Back row**: (Ireland) Chris Henry (18 apps, 17 starts, 5 pts); (Ireland) Willie Faloon (17 apps, 15 starts, 10 pts); (Ireland) **Stephen Ferris** (14 apps, 14 starts, 15 pts); (South Africa) Robbie Diack* (16 apps, 10 starts); (Ireland) David Pollock (10 apps, 9 starts); (Ireland) T. J. Anderson (12 apps, 3 starts); (Australia) Tamaiti Horua (4 apps, 1 start); (Ireland) Ali Birch (1 app); **Scrum-halves**: (Ireland) **Isaac Boss** (23 apps, 20 starts, 10 pts); (Ireland) Paul Marshall (12 apps, 4 starts, 5 pts); (Ireland) Cillian Willis (4 apps); **Fly-halves**: (Ireland) Ian Humphreys (21 apps, 18 starts, 190 pts); (England) Niall O'Connor (12 apps, 6 starts, 64 pts)	**Centres**: (Ireland) **Darren Cave** (22 apps, 21 starts, 15 pts); (Ireland) **Paddy Wallace** (16 apps, 14 starts, 15 pts); (Ireland) **Ian Whitten** (16 apps, 12 starts, 15 pts); (Ireland) Nevin Spence (3 apps, 1 start); (Ireland) Jonny Shiels (2 apps); **Wings**: (Ireland) **Andrew Trimble** (21 apps, 19 starts, 25 pts); (Scotland) **Simon Danielli** (22 apps, 18 starts, 45 pts); (Fiji) **Timoci Nagusa** (17 apps, 13 starts, 20 pts); (Ireland) Mark McCrea (1 app); **Fullbacks**: (Australia) Clinton Schifcofske (11 apps, 11 starts, 5 pts); (Ireland) Jamie Smith (10 apps, 10 starts, 15 pts); (Ireland) Bryn Cunningham (1 app, 1 start)
(c) denotes the team captain, **Bold** denotes internationally capped players. Italics denotes academy players who appeared in the senior team.^{*} denotes players qualified to play for Ireland on residency or dual nationality. Players and their allocated positions from the Ulster Rugby website.

=== Academy squad ===
==== Players in ====
- (Ireland) Luke Marshall
- (Ireland) Niall Annett
- (Ireland) Michael Allen
- (Ireland) John Burns
- (Ireland) Sean Dougall
- (Ireland) Paul Pritchard
- (Ireland) Neil McComb
- (Ireland) James McKinney
- (Ireland) Conor Gaston
- (Ireland) Michael Heaney

==== Players out ====
- (Ireland) Paul Karayiannis
- (Ireland) Stephen Douglas
- (Ireland) David McGregor
- (Ireland) David Drake

Position	Name	Nationality
High Performance Director	Gary Longwell	Ireland
Elite Player Development Officer	Jonny Bell	Ireland
Elite Player Development Officer	Niall Malone	Ireland
Strength & Conditioning Coach	Chris Shiells	Ireland
Strength & Conditioning Coach	Kevin Geary	Ireland

Academy squad
**Props**: (Ireland) Adam Macklin (2); (Ireland) Paddy McAllister (2); **Hookers**: (Ireland) Niall Annett (1); (Ireland) John Burns (1); **Locks**: (Ireland) Neil McComb (1); (Ireland) James Sandford (3)	**Back row**: (Ireland) Sean Dougall (1); (Ireland) Paul Pritchard (1); **Scrum-halves**: (Ireland) Michael Heaney (1); (Ireland) Ian Porter (3); **Fly-halves**: (Ireland) James McKinney (1)	**Centres**: (Ireland) Luke Marshall (1); (Ireland) Jonny Shiels (2); (Ireland) Nevin Spence (2); **Wings**: (Ireland) Michael Allen (1); (Ireland) Chris Cochrane (3); (Ireland) Conor Gaston (1); (Ireland) Tommy Seymour (3); **Fullbacks**: (Ireland) Ricky Andrew (2); (Ireland) Jamie Smith (3)

=== Ulster Ravens/friendly squad ===
Players, other than members of the senior or academy quad, who appeared for the Ulster Ravens or in friendlies.

Academy squad
**Props**: (Ireland) Alan Whitten; **Hookers**: (Ireland) Ryan Fisher; (Ireland) Paul Karayannis; (Ireland) David McGregor; **Locks**: (Ireland) Andrew Linton; (Ireland) Neville Magee	**Back row**: (Ireland) Stephen Dougall; (United States) Scott LaValla; (Ireland) Stuart McKenzie; (Ireland) Chris Napier; **Scrum-halves** **Fly-halves**: (Ireland) Michael Pyper	**Back three**: (Ireland) Craig Gilroy; (Ireland) David McIlwaine

== Season record ==
Competition	Played	Won	Drawn	Lost	PF	PA	PD	TF	TA
2009-10 Heineken Cup	6	4	0	2	127	94	33	6	5
2009-10 Celtic League	18	7	1	10	357	370	-13	39	35
Total	24	11	1	12	484	464	20	45	40

== Heineken Cup ==
=== Pool 4 ===
Team	P	W	D	L	Tries for	Tries against	Try diff	Points for	Points against	Points diff	TB	LB	Pts
(France) Stade Français (6)	6	4	0	2	11	7	4	124	95	29	1	1	18
(Ireland) Ulster	6	4	0	2	11	6	5	127	94	33	0	1	17
(Scotland) Edinburgh	6	3	0	3	3	10	−7	64	94	−30	0	1	13
(England) Bath	6	1	0	5	6	8	−2	84	116	−32	0	3	7

9 October 2009	Ulster (Ireland)	26–12	(England) Bath	Ravenhill, Belfast
19:30	Try: Nagusa 13' c Faloon 52' c Con: Humphreys (2/2); Pen: Humphreys (3/4) 10', 56', 78'; Drop: Humphreys 42'	Report; Match centre	Pen: Davis (4/4) 8', 20', 48', 54'; Cards: Beattie (yellow card) 25'	Attendance: 10,914; Referee: James Jones (Wales)
Ulster lineup: 1. Tom Court, 2. Andi Kyriacou, 3. BJ Botha, 4. Ed O'Donoghue, 5. Ryan Caldwell, 6. Stephen Ferris, 7. Willie Faloon, 8. Robbie Diack, 9. Iasaac Boss, 10. Ian Humphreys, 11. Andrew Trimble, 12. Paddy Wallace, 13. Darren Cave, 14. Timoci Nagusa, 15. Clinton Schifcofske.; Replacements: 16. Nigel Brady (for Kyriacou 73'), 17. Bryan Young (for Court 55'), 18. Declan Fitzpatrick (for Botha 66'), 19. Neil McComb, 20. Chris Henry (for Diack 61'), 21. Paul Marshall, 22. Ian Whitten, 23. Simon Danielli (for Nagusa 73').				Attendance: 10,914; Referee: James Jones (Wales)

17 October 2009	Edinburgh (Scotland)	17–13	(Ireland) Ulster	Murrayfield, Edinburgh
15:45	Try: Visser 70' m Pen: Godman (4/6) 2', 21', 67', 80'	Report; Match centre	Try: Nagusa 22' c Con: Humphreys (1/1); Pen: Humphreys (2/3) 29', 45'	Attendance: 5,747; Referee: Dave Pearson (England)
Ulster lineup: 1. Tom Court, 2. Andi Kyriacou, 3. BJ Botha, 4. Ed O'Donoghue, 5. Ryan Caldwell, 6. Stephen Ferris, 7. Willie Faloon, 8. Robbie Diack, 9. Iasaac Boss, 10. Ian Humphreys, 11. Andrew Trimble, 12. Paddy Wallace, 13. Darren Cave, 14. Timoci Nagusa, 15. Clinton Schifcofske.; Replacements: 16. Nigel Brady (for Kyriacou 68'), 17. Bryan Young (for Court 62'), 18. Declan Fitzpatrick (for Botha 68'), 19. Dan Tuohy (for Caldwell 49'), 20. Chris Henry (for Faloon 72'), 21. Paul Marshall (for Boss 79'), 22. Ian Whitten, 23. Simon Danielli (for Nagusa 62').				Attendance: 5,747; Referee: Dave Pearson (England)

12 December 2009	Ulster (Ireland)	23–13	(France) Stade Français	Ravenhill, Belfast
13:35	Try: Brady 20' c Danielli 48' c Con: Humphreys (2/2); Pen: Humphreys (3/4) 13', 34', 47'; Cards: Young (yellow card) 74'	Report; Match centre	Try: Arias 74' c Con: Oelschig (1/1); Pen: Beauxis (2/3) 18', 28'; Cards: Dupuy (yellow card) 46'; Attoub (yellow card) 74'	Attendance: 11,000; Referee: Dave Pearson (England)
Ulster lineup: 1. Tom Court, 2. Nigel Brady, 3. Declan Fitzpatrick, 4. Ed O'Donoghue, 5. Dan Tuohy, 6. Stephen Ferris, 7. David Pollock, 8. Chris Henry, 9. Iasaac Boss, 10. Ian Humphreys, 11. Simon Danielli, 12. Ian Whitten, 13. Darren Cave, 14. Andrew Trimble, 15. Clinton Schifcofske.; Replacements: 16. Andi Kyriacou (for Brady 69'), 17. Bryan Young (for D. Fitzpatrick 64'), 18. Justin Fitzpatrick (for Ferris 77'), 19. Ryan Caldwell, 20. Willie Faloon (for Pollock 64'), 21. Paul Marshall, 22. Niall O'Connor (for Humphreys 71'), 23. Jamie Smith (for Cave 76').				Attendance: 11,000; Referee: Dave Pearson (England)

20 December 2009	Stade Français (France)	29–16	(Ireland) Ulster	Stade Jean-Bouin, Paris
15:00	Try: Szarzewski 9' c Kayser 66' c Con: Beauxis (2/2); Pen: Beauxis (5/5) 4', 16', 22', 32', 60'	Report; Match centre	Try: Trimble 69' c Con: Humphreys (1/1); Pen: Humphreys (3/3) 2', 14', 37'	Attendance: 3,700; Referee: Chris White (England)
Ulster lineup: 1. Tom Court, 2. Nigel Brady, 3. BJ Botha, 4. Ed O'Donoghue, 5. Dan Tuohy, 6. Stephen Ferris, 7. Willie Faloon, 8. Chris Henry, 9. Iasaac Boss, 10. Ian Humphreys, 11. Simon Danielli, 12. Paddy Wallace (c), 13. Andrew Trimble, 14. Timoci Nagusa, 15. Clinton Schifcofske.; Replacements: 16. Andi Kyriacou (for Brady 66'), 17. Bryan Young (for Court 66'), 18. Declan Fitzpatrick (for Botha 71'), 19. Ryan Caldwell (for Tuohy 60'), 20. David Pollock (for Faloon 56'), 21. Cillian Willis, 22. Ian Whitten (for Nagusa 50'), 23. Darren Cave.				Attendance: 3,700; Referee: Chris White (England)

15 January 2010	Ulster (Ireland)	21–13	(Scotland) Edinburgh	Ravenhill, Belfast
20:00	Try: Cave 28' m Boss 55' c Con: Humphreys (1/2); Pen: Humphreys (2/2) 45', 69'; O'Connor (1/1) 80'; Cards: Ferris (yellow card) 59'	Report; Match centre	Try: Thompson 61' c Con: Paterson (1/1); Pen: Paterson (2/2) 22', 36'; Cards: Young (yellow card) 6'	Attendance: 8,262; Referee: Christophe Berdos (France)
Ulster lineup: 1. Tom Court, 2. Nigel Brady, 3. BJ Botha, 4. Ed O'Donoghue, 5. Dan Tuohy, 6. Stephen Ferris, 7. David Pollock, 8. Chris Henry, 9. Iasaac Boss, 10. Ian Humphreys, 11. Simon Danielli, 12. Paddy Wallace (c), 13. Darren Cave, 14. Andrew Trimble, 15. Jamie Smith.; Replacements: 16. Andi Kyriacou (for Brady 62'), 17. Bryan Young (for Court 62'), 18. Declan Fitzpatrick (for Botha 75'), 19. Ryan Caldwell (for Tuohy 72'), 20. TJ Anderson, 21. Cillian Willis, 22. Niall O'Connor (for Humphreys 72'), 23. Timoci Nagusa.				Attendance: 8,262; Referee: Christophe Berdos (France)

23 January 2010	Bath (England)	10–28	(Ireland) Ulster	Recreation Ground, Bath
15:45	Try: Banahan 20' c Con: Little (1/1); Pen: Little (1/2) 53'; Cards: Grewcock (yellow card) 33'	Report; Match centre	Try: Trimble 42' m Cave 49' c Wallace 77' c Con: O'Connor (2/3); Pen: O'Connor (3/3) 5', 19', 33'	Attendance: 10,845; Referee: Jérôme Garces (France)
Ulster lineup: 1. Tom Court, 2. Nigel Brady, 3. BJ Botha, 4. Ed O'Donoghue, 5. Dan Tuohy, 6. Stephen Ferris, 7. David Pollock, 8. Chris Henry, 9. Iasaac Boss, 10. Niall O'Connor, 11. Simon Danielli, 12. Paddy Wallace (c), 13. Darren Cave, 14. Andrew Trimble, 15. Jamie Smith.; Replacements: 16. Andi Kyriacou (for Brady 64'), 17. Bryan Young (for Court 74'), 18. Declan Fitzpatrick (for O'Donoghue 66'), 19. Ryan Caldwell (for Tuohy 72'), 20. TJ Anderson (for Ferris 74'), 21. Cillian Willis (for Boss 74'), 22. Ian Humphreys, 23. Timoci Nagusa.				Attendance: 10,845; Referee: Jérôme Garces (France)

== Celtic League ==
	Team	Pld	W	D	L	PF	PA	PD	TF	TA	Try bonus	Losing bonus	Pts
1	(Ireland) Leinster	18	13	0	5	359	295	+64	27	29	1	2	55
2	(Wales) Ospreys	18	11	1	6	384	298	+86	37	26	3	3	52
3	(Scotland) Glasgow Warriors	18	11	2	5	390	321	+69	31	24	2	1	51
4	(Ireland) Munster	18	9	0	9	319	282	+37	33	20	3	6	45
5	(Wales) Cardiff Blues	18	10	0	8	349	315	+34	33	28	2	2	44
6	(Scotland) Edinburgh	18	8	0	10	385	391	−6	40	40	4	5	41
7	(Wales) Newport Gwent Dragons	18	8	1	9	333	378	−45	32	37	3	2	39
8	(Ireland) Ulster	18	7	1	10	357	370	−13	39	35	4	2	36
9	(Wales) Scarlets	18	5	0	13	361	382	−21	35	35	1	8	29
10	(Ireland) Connacht	18	5	1	12	254	459	−205	20	53	0	4	26
Under the standard bonus point system, points are awarded as follows: 4 points for a win; 2 points for a draw; 1 bonus point for scoring 4 tries (or more) (Try bonus); 1 bonus point for losing by 7 points (or fewer) (Losing bonus)
Green background (rows 1 to 4) are play-off places. Source: RaboDirect PRO12

6 September 2009	Newport Gwent Dragons (Wales)	23 – 6	(Ireland) Ulster	Rodney Parade, Newport
14:05	Try: Bew; Fussell; Young; Con: Tovey; Pen: Arlidge (2); Cards: McKenzie (yellow card)	Report; Match centre	Pen: Humphreys (2); Cards: Botha (yellow card)	Attendance: 4,561; Referee: Carlo Damasco
Ulster lineup: 1. Bryan Young, 2. Andi Kyriacou, 3. BJ Botha, 4. Dan Tuohy, 5. Ryan Caldwell, 6. Chris Henry, 7. Willie Faloon, 8. Robbie Diack, 9. Isaac Boss, 10. Ian Humphreys, 11. Simon Danielli, 12. Ian Whitten, 13. Andrew Trimble, 14. Timoci Nagusa, 15. Bryn Cunningham.; Replacements: 16. Nigel Brady (for Kyriacou 56'), 17. Declan Fitzpatrick (for Whitten 36'), 18. Ed O'Donoghue (for Henry 36'), 19. TJ Anderson (for Diack 68'), 20. Paul Marshall (for Humphreys 68'), 21. Paddy Wallace (for Cunningham 29'), 22. Darren Cave (for Nagusa 68').				Attendance: 4,561; Referee: Carlo Damasco

12 September 2009	Ospreys (Wales)	16 – 20	(Ireland) Ulster	Liberty Stadium, Swansea
18:30	Try: Walker; Jones; Pen: Hook (2)	Report; Match centre	Try: Tuohy; Danielli (2); Con: Humphreys; Pen: Humphreys; Cards: Schifcofske (yellow card)	Attendance: 7,072; Referee: Alan Lewis
Ulster lineup: 1. Bryan Young, 2. Andi Kyriacou, 3. BJ Botha, 4. Ed O'Donoghue, 5. Dan Tuohy, 6. Chris Henry, 7. Willie Faloon, 8. Robbie Diack, 9. Isaac Boss, 10. Ian Humphreys, 11. Simon Danielli, 12. Ian Whitten, 13. Darren Cave, 14. Timoci Nagusa, 15. Clinton Schifcofske.; Replacements: 16. Nigel Brady (for Kyriacou 71'), 17. Declan Fitzpatrick (for Botha 57'), 18. Tamaiti Horua (for Diack 54'), 19. TJ Anderson (for Tuohy 27'), 20. Cillian Willis (for Nagusa 57'), 21. Niall O'Connor, 22. Jonny Shiels.				Attendance: 7,072; Referee: Alan Lewis

18 September 2009	Ulster (Ireland)	13 – 16	(Scotland) Edinburgh	Ravenhill, Belfast
20:00	Try: Ferris; Schifcofske; Con: Humphreys	Report; Match centre	Try: Visser; Con: Paterson; Pen: Paterson (2); Drop: Godman; Cards: Wallace (yellow card)	Attendance: 8,899; Referee: Nigel Owens
Ulster lineup: 1. Bryan Young, 2. Andi Kyriacou, 3. BJ Botha, 4. Neil McComb, 5. Ed O'Donoghue, 6. Stephen Ferris, 7. Willie Faloon, 8. Chris Henry, 9. Isaac Boss, 10. Ian Humphreys, 11. Timoci Nagusa, 12. Ian Whitten, 13. Darren Cave, 14. Simon Danielli, 15. Clinton Schifcofske.; Replacements: 16. Nigel Brady (for Kyriacou 66'), 17. Declan Fitzpatrick (for Botha 58'), 18. Diack (for Ferris 76'), 19. Tamaiti Horua (for Henry 57'), 20 Cillian Willis (for Nagusa 74'), 21. Paddy Wallace (for Humphreys 48'), 22. Andrew Trimble (for Whitten 62').				Attendance: 8,899; Referee: Nigel Owens

25 September 2009	Connacht (Ireland)	6 – 30	(Ireland) Ulster	The Sportsground, Galway
20:00	Pen: Keatley (2)	Report; Match centre	Try: Cave; Botha; Nagusa; Humphreys; Con: Humphreys (2); Pen: Humphreys (2)	Attendance: 2,435; Referee: George Clancy
Ulster lineup: 1. Tom Court, 2. Andi Kyriacou, 3. BJ Botha, 4. Ed O'Donoghue, 5. Dan Tuohy, 6. Chris Henry, 7. Willie Faloon, 8. Robbie Diack, 9. Isaac Boss, 10. Ian Humphreys, 11. Simon Danielli, 12. Darren Cave, 13. Paddy Wallace, 14. Timoci Nagusa, 15. Clinton Schifcofske.; Replacements: 16. Nigel Brady (for Kyriacou 72'), 17. Declan Fitzpatrick (for Botha 65'), 18. Neil McComb (for O'Donoghue 77'), 19. TJ Anderson (for Henry 65'), 20. Paul Marshall (for Boss 77'), 21. Ian Whitten (for Wallace 77'), 22. Andrew Trimble (for Danielli 32').				Attendance: 2,435; Referee: George Clancy

2 October 2009	Ulster (Ireland)	45 – 24	(Wales) Scarlets	Ravenhill, Belfast
19:05	Try: Faloon; Trimble (2); Nagusa; Whitten; Con: Humphreys (4); Pen: Humphreys (4)	Report; Match centre	Try: Davies (2); Con: Jones; Pen: Jones (4); Cards: Thomas (yellow card)	Attendance: 8,141; Referee: Peter Allan
Ulster lineup: 1. Tom Court, 2. Nigel Brady, 3. BJ Botha, 4. Ed O'Donoghue, 5. Ryan Caldwell, 6. Stephen Ferris, 7. Robbie Diack, 8. Willie Faloon, 9. Isaac Boss, 10. Ian Humphreys, 11. Andrew Trimble, 12. Paddy Wallace, 13. Darren Cave, 14. Timoci Nagusa, 15. Clinton Schifcofske.; Replacements: 16. Andi Kyriacou, 17. D Fitzpatrick (for Botha 56'), 18. Neil McComb (for Ferris 67'), 19. TJ Anderson (for Faloon 67'), 20. Paul Marshall (for Boss 73'), 21. Ian Whitten (for Cave 73'), 22. Mark McCrea (for Nagusa 73'.				Attendance: 8,141; Referee: Peter Allan

24 October 2009	Ulster (Ireland)	16 – 14	(Ireland) Leinster	Ravenhill, Belfast
18:00	Try: Boss; Con: Humphreys; Pen: Humphreys (3); Cards: Horua (yellow card)	Report; Match centre	Try: Berne; Fitzgerald; Con: Berne; Sexton; Cards: Jackman (yellow card)	Attendance: 11,523; Referee: Andrew Small
Ulster lineup: 1. Tom Court, 2. Nigel Brady, 3. BJ Botha, 4. Dan Tuohy, 5. Ryan Caldwell, 6. Tamaiti Horua, 7. Willie Faloon, 8. Chris Henry, 9. Isaac Boss, 10. Ian Humphreys, 11. Andrew Trimble, 12. Ian Whitten, 13. Darren Cave, 14. Timoci Nagusa, 15. Clinton Schifcofske.; Replacements: 16. Andi Kyriacou, 17. Bryan Young (for Botha 63'), 18. Ed O'Donoghue, 19. Robbie Diack (for Horua 63'), 20. Paul Marshall, 21. Niall O'Connor, 22. Simon Danielli.				Attendance: 11,523; Referee: Andrew Small

31 October 2009	Munster (Ireland)	24 – 10	(Ireland) Ulster	Thomond Park, Limerick
17:00	Try: De Villiers; Wallace; Earls; Warwick; Con: O'Gara (2)	Report; Match centre	Try: Humphreys; Con: Humphreys; Pen: Humphreys; Cards: Cave (yellow card)	Attendance: 23,298; Referee: Alain Rolland
Ulster lineup: 1. Tom Court, 2. Nigel Brady, 3. BJ Botha, 4. Ed O'Donoghue, 5. Ryan Caldwell, 6. Stephen Ferris, 7. Willie Faloon, 8.Chris Henry, 9. Isaac Boss, 10. Ian Humphreys, 11. Andrew Trimble, 12. Darren Cave, 13. Paddy Wallace, 14. Timoci Nagusa, 15. Clinton Schifcofske.; Replacements: 16. Andi Kyriacou (for Brady 63', 17. Bryan Young (for Court 63'), 18. Tamaiti Horua, 19. Robbie Diack (for Faloon 66'), 20. Paul Marshall (for Boss 66'), 21. Ian Whitten, 22. Simon Danielli (for Nagusa 52').				Attendance: 23,298; Referee: Alain Rolland

4 December 2009	Ulster (Ireland)	13 – 25	(Scotland) Glasgow Warriors	Ravenhill, Belfast
20:00	Try: Court; Con: Humphreys; Pen: Humphreys (2)	Report; Match centre	Try: Evans; Con: Parks; Pen: Parks; Cards: Welsh (yellow card)	Attendance: 8,761; Referee: James Jones
Ulster lineup: 1. Tom Court, 2. Andi Kyriacou, 3. Declan Fitzpatrick, 4. Dan Tuohy, 5. Ryan Caldwell, 6. David Pollock, 7. Willie Faloon, 8. Chris Henry, 9. Isaac Boss, 10. Ian Humphreys, 11. Simon Danielli, 12. Ian Whitten. 13. Darren Cave, 14. Timoci Nagusa, 15. Clinton Schifcofske.; Replacements: 16. Nigel Brady', 17. Bryan Young (for Fitzpatrick 63'), 18. Ed O'Donoghue (for Caldwell 58'), 19. TJ Anderson (for Faloon 58'), 20. Paul Marshall (for Nagusa 31'), 21. Niall O'Connor (for Humphreys 69'), 22. Jonny Shiels (for Cave 65').				Attendance: 8,761; Referee: James Jones

26 December 2009	Leinster (Ireland)	15 – 3	(Ireland) Ulster	RDS Arena, Dublin
17:30	Try: Kearney; Heaslip; Con: Berne; Pen: Berne	Report; Match centre	Pen: O'Connor; Cards: Tuohy (yellow card)	Attendance: 18,140; Referee: George Clancy
Ulster lineup: 1. Bryan Young, 2. Nigel Brady, 3. BJ Botha, 4. Ed O'Donoghue, 5. Dan Tuohy, 6. TJ Anderson, 7. Willie Faloon, 8. Chris Henry, 9. Isaac Boss, 10. Niall O'Connor, 11. Simon Danielli, 12. Ian Whitten, 13. Darren Cave, 14. Timoci Nagusa, 15. Jamie Smith.; Replacements: 16. Andi Kyriacou (for Brady 70'), 17. Declan Fitzpatrick for Botha (56), 18. Ryan Caldwell (for Henry 66'), 19. Willie Faloon, 20. Cillian Willis, 21. Ian Humphreys (for O'Connor 40'), Jonny Shiels (for Cave (26').				Attendance: 18,140; Referee: George Clancy

2 January 2010	Ulster (Ireland)	15 – 10	(Ireland) Munster	Ravenhill, Belfast
18:00	Try: Danielli (2); Con: Humphreys; Pen: Humphreys	Report; Match centre	Try: De Villers; Con: Warwick; Pen: Warwick	Attendance: 11,800; Referee: Dudley Phillips
Ulster lineup: 1. Tom Court, 2. Nigel Brady, 3. BJ Botha, 4. Ed O'Donoghue, 5. Dan Tuohy, 6. Stephen Ferris, 7. Willie Faloon, 8. Chris Henry, 9. Isaac Boss, 10. Ian Humphreys, 11. Simon Danielli, 12. Paddy Wallace, 13. Ian Whitten, 14. Andrew Trimble, 15. Jamie Smith.; Replacements: 16. Andi Kyriacou (for Brady 55'), 17. Declan Fitzpatrick, 18. Ryan Caldwell, 19. TJ Anderson (for Henry 4'); 20. Cillian Willis, 21. Niall O'Connor (for Humphreys 61'), Timoci Nagusa (for Wallace 52').				Attendance: 11,800; Referee: Dudley Phillips

19 February 2010	Ulster (Ireland)	22 – 22	(Wales) Newport Gwent Dragons	Ravenhill, Belfast
19:05	Try: Wallace; Danielli; Pen: Humphreys (4); Cards: Best (yellow card)	Report; Match centre	Try: Jones; Con: Tovey; Pen: Tovey (4); Drop: Tovey; Cards: Gomer-Davies (yellow card)	Attendance: 7,909; Referee: Peter Allan
Ulster lineup: 1. Bryan Young, 2. Rory Best, 3. BJ Botha, 4. Dan Tuohy, 5. Ed O'Donoghue, 6. TJ Anderson, 7. David Pollock, 8. Chris Henry, 9. Isaac Boss, 10. Ian Humphreys, 11. Simon Danielli, 12. Paddy Wallace, 13. Darren Cave, 14. Andrew Trimble, 15. Jamie Smith.; Replacements: 16. Nigel Brady (for Pollock 73'), 17. D. Fitzpatrick (for Young 57'), 18. Ryan Caldwell (for O'Donoghue 57'), 19. Robbie Diack for Anderson (57), 20. Ian Porter, 21. Ian Whitten (for Smith 63'), 22. Timoci Nagusa (for Danielli 68').				Attendance: 7,909; Referee: Peter Allan

5 March 2010	Scarlets (Wales)	25 – 8	(Ireland) Ulster	Parc y Scarlets, Llanelli
19:05	Try: Fenby; Knoyle; Priestland; Con: Priestland (2); Pen: Priestland (2)	Report; Match centre	Try: Wallace; Pen: Humphreys; Cards: Caldwell (yellow card); Pollock (yellow card)	Attendance: 6,266; Referee: Peter Allan
Ulster lineup: 1. Tom Court, 2. Nigel Brady, 3. BJ Botha, 4. Ed O'Donoghue, 5. Ryan Caldwell, 6. Dan Tuohy, 7. David Pollock, 8. Chris Henry, 9. Isaac Boss, 10. Ian Humphreys, 11. Andrew Trimble, 12. Paddy Wallace, 13. Darren Cave, 14. Timoci Nagusa, 15. Jamie Smith.; Replacements: 16. Andi Kyriacou (for Faloon 75'), 17. Bryan Young (for Court 62'), 18. Robbie Diack (for O'Donoghue 65'), 19. Willie Faloon (for Pollock 65'), 20. Paul Marshall, 21. Niall O'Connor (for Humphreys 62'), 22. Simon Danielli (for Nagusa 50').				Attendance: 6,266; Referee: Peter Allan

26 March 2010	Cardiff Blues (Wales)	19 – 9	(Ireland) Ulster	Cardiff City Stadium
19:05	Try: Molitika; Con: Blair; Pen: Blair (4)	Report; Match centre	Pen: O'Connor (3); Cards: Caldwell (yellow card); Cave (yellow card)	Attendance: 7,532; Referee: Neil Patterson
Ulster lineup: 1. Tom Court, 2. Rory Best, 3. BJ Botha, 4. Dan Tuohy, 5. Ryan Caldwell, 6. Stephen Ferris, 7. David Pollock, 8. Chris Henry, 9. Paul Marshall, 10. Niall O'Connor, 11. Simon Danielli, 12. Paddy Wallace, 13. Darren Cave, 14. Andrew Trimble, 15. Jamie Smith.; Replacements: 16. Nigel Brady (for Best 72'), 17. Declan Fitzpatrick (for Court 58'), 18. Ed O'Donoghue (for Tuohy 48'), 19. Robbie Diack, 20. Michael Heaney, 21. Ian Humphreys, 22. Timoci Nagusa (for Danielli 76').				Attendance: 7,532; Referee: Neil Patterson

3 April 2010	Ulster (Ireland)	24 – 33	(Wales) Cardiff Blues	Ravenhill, Belfast
19:30	Try: Ferris; Henry; Con: Humphreys; Pen: O'Connor (4)	Report; Match centre	Try: Laulala; Rush; Hewitt; Con: Sweeney (2); Halfpenny; Pen: Halfpenny (4)	Attendance: 7,334; Referee: Andy Macpherson
Ulster lineup: 1. Declan Fitzpatrick, 2. Rory Best, 3. BJ Botha, 4. Ed O'Donoghue, 5 Ryan Caldwell, 6. Stephen Ferris, 7 David Pollock, 8. Chris Henry, 9. Isaac Boss, 10. Niall O'Connor, 11. Timoci Nagusa, 12. Paddy Wallace, 13. Darren Cave, 14. Andrew Trimble, 15. Simon Danielli.; Replacements: 16. Andi Kyriacou (for Nagusa 73'), 17. Bryan Young (for Fitzpatrick 50'), 18. Dan Tuohy, 19. Robbie Diack (for Pollock 50'), 20. Paul Marshall (for Boss 72'), 21. Ian Humphreys (for O'Connor 62'), 22. Ian Whitten (for Ferris 66').				Attendance: 7,334; Referee: Andy Macpherson

13 April 2010	Ulster (Ireland)	27 – 38	(Wales) Ospreys	Ravenhill, Belfast
19:30	Try: Danielli; Trimble; Con: O'Connor; Pen: O'Connor (5)	Report; Match centre	Try: Williams; Hook (2); Bowe; Con: Biggar (3); Pen: Biggar (4); Cards: Gough (yellow card)	Attendance: 7,649; Referee: Neil Paterson
Ulster lineup: 1. Bryn Young, 2. Rory Best, 3. BJ Botha, 4. Ed O'Donoghue, 5. Dan Tuohy, 6. Stephen Ferris 66', 7. Chris Henry, 8. Robbie Diack, 9. Isaac Boss, 10. Niall O'Connor, 11. Simon Danielli, 12. Ian Whitten, 13. Darren Cave, 14. Andrew Trimble, 15. Paddy Wallace.; Replacements: 16. Andi Kyriacou (for Best 80'), 17. Tom Court (for Young 61'), 18. Ryan Caldwell, 19. David Pollock, 20. Paul Marshall (for Boss 68'), 21. Ian Humphreys, 22. Nevin Spence (for Wallace 80').				Attendance: 7,649; Referee: Neil Paterson

16 April 2010	Glasgow Warriors (Scotland)	25 – 18	(Ireland) Ulster	Firhill Stadium, Glasgow
19:05	Try: Morrison; Con: Parks; Pen: Parks (2); Drop: Parks (4)	Report; Match centre	Try: Marshall; Smith; Con: Humphreys; Pen: Humphreys (2)	Attendance: 3,766; Referee: Tim Hayes
Ulster lineup: 1. Tom Court, 2. Andi Kyriacou, 3. Declan Fitzpatrick, 4. Ed O'Donoghue, 5. Ryan Caldwell, 6. David Pollock, 7. Chris Henry, 8. Robbie Diack, 9. Paul Marshall, 10. Ian Humphreys, 11. Nevin Spence, 12. Ian Whitten, 13. Darren Cave, 14. Andrew Trimble, 15. Simon Danielli.; Replacements: 16. Nigel Brady (for Kyriacou 48'), 17. BJ Botha (for Fitzpatrick 48'), 18. Dan Tuohy (for O'Donoghue 16'), 19. TJ Anderson (for Diack 36'), 20. Isaac Boss (for Marshall 65'), 21. Niall O'Connor, 22. Jamie Smith (for Spence 70').				Attendance: 3,766; Referee: Tim Hayes

25 April 2010	Edinburgh (Scotland)	25 – 37	(Ireland) Ulster	Murrayfield, Edinburgh
16:05	Try: Visser (2); Turnbull; Con: Godman (2); Pen: Godman (2)	Report; Match centre	Try: Smith; Danielli; Whitten; Humphreys; Ferris; Con: O'Connor; Humphreys (2); Pen: O'Connor; Humphreys; Cards: Whitten (yellow card)	Attendance: 3,759; Referee: Nigel Owens
Ulster lineup: 1. Tom Court, 2. Rory Best, 3. BJ Botha, 4. Ed O'Donoghue, 5. Dan Tuohy, 6. Stephen Ferris, 7. Willie Faloon, 8. Robbie Diack, 9. Paul Marshall, 10. Niall O'Connor, 11. Simon Danielli, 12. Ian Whitten, 13. Darren Cave, 14. Andrew Trimble, 15. Jamie Smith.; Replacements: 16. Andy Kyriacou (for Best 75'), 17. Bryan Young (for Court 60'), 18. Ryan Caldwell (for Tuohy 62'), 19. TJ Anderson, 20. Isaac Boss (for Smith 60'), 21. Ian Humphreys (for O'Connor 36'), 22. Nevin Spence (for Trimble 73').				Attendance: 3,759; Referee: Nigel Owens

7 May 2010	Ulster (Ireland)	41 – 10	(Ireland) Connacht	Ravenhill, Belfast
19:30	Try: Danielli; Humphreys; Kyriacou; Whitten; Tuohy; Smith; Con: Humphreys (4); Pen: Humphreys	Report; Match centre	Try: Loughney; Con: Keatly; Pen: Keatly	Attendance: 7,755; Referee: Dudley Phillips
Ulster lineup: 1. Tom Court, 2. Rory Best, 3. BJ Botha, 4. Ed O'Donoghue, 5. Dan Tuohy, 6. TJ Anderson, 7. Willie Faloon, 8. Robbie Diack, 9. Paul Marshall, 10. Ian Humphreys, 11. Simon Danielli, 12. Ian Whitten, 13. Darren Cave, 14. Andrew Trimble, 15. Jamie Smith.; Replacements: 16. Andy Kyriacou (for Best 43'), 17. Bryan Young (for Botha 62'), 18. Ryan Caldwell, 19. Neil McComb (for O'Donoghue 65'), 20. Isaac Boss, 21. Ali Birch (for Anderson 75'), 22. Timoci Nagusa (for Cave 53').				Attendance: 7,755; Referee: Dudley Phillips

== Home attendance ==
Domestic League					European Cup					Total	
League	Fixtures	Average Attendance	Highest	Lowest	League	Fixtures	Average Attendance	Highest	Lowest	Total Attendance	Average Attendance
2009–10 Celtic League	9	8,863	11,800	7,334	2009–10 Heineken Cup	3	10,509	11,000	8,262	109,947	9,162

== Ulster Ravens ==
=== British and Irish Cup ===
==== Pool C ====
Team	P	W	D	L	PF	PA	PD	TF	TB	LB	Pts
(Ireland) Ulster Ravens	5	4	1	0	165	62	103	22	3	0	21
(England) London Welsh	5	4	0	1	137	78	59	18	3	1	20
(England) Bedford Blues	5	3	0	2	92	94	-2	11	1	0	13
(Wales) Aberavon	5	2	0	3	51	131	-80	4	0	1	9
(Wales) Llanelli	5	1	1	3	106	117	-11	11	1	1	8
(England) Moseley	5	0	0	5	69	138	-69	10	1	0	1
Points breakdown: *4 points for a win *2 points for a draw *1 bonus point for a loss by seven points or less *1 bonus point for scoring four or more tries in a match

20 November 2009	Ulster Ravens (Ireland)	29 – 3	(England) Bedford Blues	Ravenhill, Belfast
19:30	Try: Seymour; D. Fitzpatrick; Cochrane; Kyriacou; Con: O'Connor (3)	Report	Pen: Davies	Attendance: 1,132
Ulster Ravens lineup: 1. Bryan Young, 2. Andi Kyriacou, 3. Declan Fitzpatrick, 4. Dan Tuohy, 5. Neil McComb, 6. David Pollock, 7 Willie Faloon, 8. Tamaiti Horua, 9. Paul Marshall, 10. Niall O'Connor, 11. Chris Cochrane, 12. Ian Whitten, 13. Jonny Shiels, 14. Tommy Seymour, 15. Clinton Schifcoske.; Replacements: Nigel Brady, Paddy McAllister, Ed O'Donoghue, Chris Henry, Cillian Willis, Ian Humphreys, Jamie Smith.				Attendance: 1,132

27 November 2009	Moseley (England)	21 – 32	(Ireland) Ulster Ravens	Billesley Common, Birmingham
19:30	Try: May; Bressington; Penalty try Con: ? (3)	Report	Try: Seymour; Tuohy; Macklin; McComb; Con: O'Connor (3); Pen: O'Connor (2)	Attendance: 750
Ulster Ravens lineup: 1. Declan Fitzpatrick, 2. Nigel Brady, 3. Adam Macklin, 4. Dan Tuohy, 5. Neil McComb, 6. David Pollock, 7. Willie Faloon, 8. Tamaiti Horua, 9. Paul Marshall, 10. Niall O'Connor, 11. Chris Cochrane, 12. Ian Whitten, 13. Jonny Shiels, 14. Tommy Seymour, 15. Jamie Smith.; Replacements: Ryan Fisher, Paddy McAllister, T. J. Anderson, Ali Birch, Ian Porter, Luke Marshall, Darren Cave.				Attendance: 750

12 February 2010	Llanelli (Wales)	21 – 21	(Ireland) Ulster Ravens	Parc y Scarlets, Llanelli
19:15	Try: Thomas; Shingler; Con: Newton; Pen: Newton (3)	Report	Try: Marshall; McCrea; Con: Humphreys; Pen: O'Connor (2); Humphreys	Attendance: 500
Ulster Ravens lineup: 1. Bryan Young, 2. Andi Kyriacou (capt), 3. Declan Fitzpatrick, 4. Neil McComb, 5. Ryan Caldwell, 6. Thomas Anderson, 7. David Pollock, 8. Robbie Diack, 9. Cillian Willis, 10. Niall O'Connor, 11. Timoci Nagusa, 12. Ian Whitten, 13. Mark McCrea, 14. Tommy Seymour, 15. Jamie Smith.; Replacements: Nigel Brady, Adam Macklin, Ed O’Donoghue, Willie Faloon, Paul Marshall, Ian Humphreys, Darren Cave.				Attendance: 500

26 February 2010	Ulster Ravens (Ireland)	21 – 17	(England) London Welsh	Ravenhill, Belfast
19:30	Try: Marshall; Nagusa; Con: O'Connor; Pen: O'Connor (3)	Report	Try: Starling; Pen: Lewis-Pratt (2); Ross (2)	Attendance: 739
Ulster Ravens lineup: 1. Bryan Young, 2. Nigel Brady (c), 3. Tom Court, 4. Neil McComb, 5. Ryan Caldwell, 6. T. J. Anderson, 7. Willie Faloon, 8. Robbie Diack, 9. Paul Marshall, 10. Niall O'Connor, 11. Timoci Nagusa, 12. Ian Whitten, 13. Michael Allen, 14. Tommy Seymour, 15. Mark McCrea.; Replacements: Alan Whitten (for Court 70'), Ed O’Donoghue (for Diack 68'), Cillian Willis (for Marshall 70'), Darren Cave (for Nagusa 52').				Attendance: 739

12 March 2010	Ulster Ravens (Ireland)	62 – 0	(Wales) Aberavon	Ravenhill, Belfast
19:30	Try: Whitten; D. Fitzpatrick; Cunningham; Willis; Seymour (2); Allen; McCrea; Humphreys; Con: O'Connor (6)	Report		Attendance: 793
Ulster Ravens lineup: 1. Bryan Young, 2. Andi Kyriacou (capt), 3. Declan Fitzpatrick, 4. Neil McComb, 5. Ed O'Donoghue; 6. T. J. Anderson, 7. Scott LaValla, 8. Robbie Diack, 9. Cillian Willis, 10. Niall O'Connor, 11. Tommy Seymour, 12. Ian Whitten, 13. Michael Allen, 14. Mark McCrea, 15. Bryn Cunningham.; Replacements: Nigel Brady, Paul Karayannis, Dan Tuohy, Mark Robinson, Paul Marshall, Ian Humphreys, Chris Cochrane.				Attendance: 793

==== Semi-final ====
24 April 2010	Munster A (Ireland)	27 – 3	(Ireland) Ulster Ravens	Thomond Park, Limerick
15:30	Try: Manning (2); Williams; Archer; Con: Cusack (2/4); Pen: Cusack (1)	Report	Pen: McKinney (1)	Attendance: 24,112
Ulster Ravens lineup: 1. Paddy McAllister, 2. Nigel Brady (c), 3. Declan Fitzpatrick, 4. Andrew Linton, 5. Neil McComb, 6. Ali Birch, 7. Stephen Dougall, Scott LaValla, 9. Ian Porter, 10. James McKinney, 11. Chris Cochrane, 12. Jonny Shiels, 13. Michael Allen, 14. Tommy Seymour, 15. David McIlwaine.; Replacements: Niall Annett, Paul Karayiannis, Neville Magee, Stuart McKenzie, Michael Pyper, Luke Marshall, Craig Gilroy.				Attendance: 24,112

== Friendlies ==
21 August 2009	Ulster 'A' (Ireland)	19-7	(England) Newcastle Falcons	Ravenhill, Belfast
	Try: Tuohy; Cave; Pen: Schifcofske (3)	Report	Try: Wilson; Con: Gopperth
Ulster lineup: 1. Bryan Young, 2. Andi Kyriacou, 3. BJ Botha, 4. Dan Tuohy, 5. Ryan Caldwell, 6. Chris Henry, 7. Willie Faloon, 8. Robbie Diack, 9. Isaac Boss, 10. Ian Humphreys, 11. Simon Danielli, 12. Ian Whitten, 13. Darren Cave, 14. Clinton Schifcofske, 15. Bryn Cunningham.; Replacements: 16. Nigel Brady, 17. Declan Fitzpatrick, 18. Neil McComb, 19. TJ Anderson, 20. Paul Marshall, 21. Niall O'Connor, 22. Nevin Spence.

26 August 2009	Ulster (Ireland)	53-5	(Italy) Viadana	Ravenhill, Belfast
	Try: Nagusa (3); Brady; McCrea (2); Anderson; Shiels; Smith; Con: O'Connor (4)	Report	Try: Denti
Ulster lineup: 1. Tom Court, 2. Nigel Brady, 3. Declan Fitzpatrick, 4. Ed O'Donoghue, 5. Neil McComb, 6. Matt McCullough, 7. T. J. Anderson, 8. Chris Henry, 9. Cillian Willis, 10. Niall O'Connor, 11. Tommy Seymour, 12. Jonny Shiels, 13. Mark McCrea, 14. Timoci Nagusa, 15. Jamie Smith.; Replacements: David McGregor (for Brady 60'), Justin Fitzpatrick (for D. Fitzpatrick 29'), Dan Tuohy, Chris Napier (for Henry 41'), Ian Porter (for Willis 50'), Ian Humphreys, Clinton Schifcofske, Paddy McAllister (for J. Fitzpatrick 65), Paul Pritchard (for O'Donoghue 70'), Nevin Spence (for Seymour 50').

28 August 2009	Worcester Warriors (Ireland)	3-25	(Ireland) Ulster	Sixways Stadium, Worcester
	Pen: Walker	Report	Try: Whitten; Boss; Diack; Con: Humphreys (2); Pen: Humphreys (2)
Ulster lineup: 1. Bryan Young, 2. Andi Kyriacou, 3. BJ Botha, 4. Dan Tuohy, 5. Ryan Caldwell, 6. Chris Henry, 7. Willie Faloon, 8. Robbie Diack, 9. Isaac Boss, 10. Ian Humphreys, 11. Nevin Spence, 12. Ian Whitten, 13. Andrew Trimble, 14. Timoci Nagusa, 15. Bryn Cunningham.; Replacements: Nigel Brady, Tom Court, Declan Fitzpatrick, Ed O'Donoghue, T. J. Anderson, Ian Porter, Niall O'Connor, Jonny Shiels, Darren Cave.

== Ulster Rugby Awards ==
The Ulster Rugby Awards ceremony was held on 20 May 2010. Winners were:

- Ulster Rugby Personality of the Year: Chris Henry
- Rugby Writers Player of the Year: Chris Henry
- Supporters Club Player of the Year: Chris Henry
- Ulster Player of the Year: Andrew Trimble
- Young Ulster Player of the Year: Jamie Smith
- Youth Player of the Year: Jonny Murphy, Banbridge RFC
- Schools Player of the Year: Charlie Simpson, Ballymena Academy
- Academy Player of the Year: Nevin Spence
- Club of the Year: Ballymoney RFC
- Dorrington B. Faulker Award: Hal Burnison, Malone RFC
- Club Player of the Year: Mark Robinson, Queen's University RFC
- Special Merit Award: Joe Eagleson, Honorary Secretary of the IRFU Ulster Branch
