= 2011–12 Ulster Rugby season =

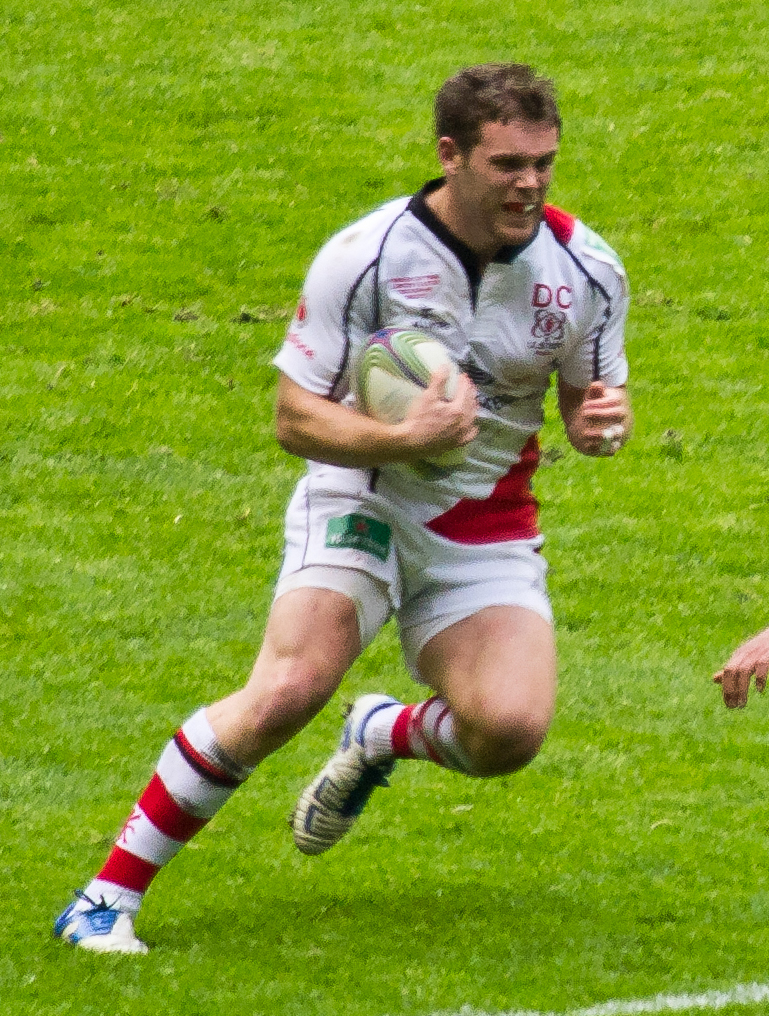
- Darren Cave in the 2012 Heineken Cup final
- Ground: Ravenhill Stadium (Capacity: 12,500)
- Coach(es): David Humphreys (Director of Rugby); Brian McLaughlin (Head Coach)
- Captain: Johann Muller
- Top scorer: Ian Humphreys (168)
- Most tries: Andrew Trimble (6); Craig Gilroy (6)
- League(s): Heineken Cup (finalists); Pro12 (6th)
1st kit	2nd kit

The 2011–12 Ulster Rugby season was Ulster's 18th season since the advent of professionalism in rugby union, and their third under head coach Brian McLaughlin. They competed in the Heineken Cup and the inaugural Pro12, successor competition to the Celtic League.

They finished sixth in the Pro12, and qualified for next season's Champions Cup as the third highest placed Irish team. Scrum-half Ruan Pienaar, lock Dan Tuohy and prop BJ Botha made the Pro12 Dream Team. They finished second in their pool in the Heineken Cup, beat Edinburgh in the semi-final, and lost to Leinster in the final. Out-half Ian Humphreys was Ulster's top scorer with 168 points. Wings Andrew Trimble and Craig Gilroy were joint top try scorers with six each. Flanker Chris Henry was Player of the Year. Craig Gilroy won the IRUPA Try of the Year award.

Brian McLaughlin, who was coaching Ulster while on sabbatical from his regular job as a teacher at Royal Belfast Academical Institution, stood to lose his teaching position and pension if he extended his contract with Ulster any further, and as head coach risked losing his job at any time. Director of rugby David Humphreys decided to offer him the security of a full-time position coaching the academy, and to replace him as head coach with Mark Anscombe.

== Staff ==
Position	Name	Nationality
Chief Executive Officer	Shane Logan	Ireland
Director of Rugby	David Humphreys	Ireland
Head coach	Brian McLaughlin	Ireland
Assistant coach (backs)	Neil Doak	Ireland
Defence coach	Jonny Bell	Ireland
Head of strength and conditioning	Jonny Davis	Ireland
Team doctor	David Irwin	Ireland
Team physiotherapist	Gareth Robinson	Ireland
Physiotherapist	Alan McAldin	Ireland
Performance analyst	Alex McCloy	Ireland
Team manager	David Millar	Ireland
Team administration co-ordinator	Sarah Sherry	Ireland
Resource Manager	Mick Ennis	Australia

== Squad ==
=== Senior squad ===
==== Players in (Season 2011/2012) ====
- (New Zealand) John Afoa from (New Zealand) Auckland Blues
- (Ireland) Callum Black from (England) Worcester
- (Ireland) Mike McComish from (Ireland) Connacht
- (New Zealand) Jared Payne from (New Zealand) Auckland Blues
- (Ireland) Lewis Stevenson from (England) Harlequins
- (South Africa) Stefan Terblanche from (South Africa) Sharks (On 3 Month Deal)

==== Promoted from academy ====
- (Ireland) Niall Annett
- (Ireland) Paddy Jackson
- (Ireland) Luke Marshall
- (Ireland) James McKinney

==== Players out (Season 2011/2012) ====
- (Ireland) T. J. Anderson to (Ireland) Connacht
- (South Africa) BJ Botha to (Ireland) Munster Rugby
- (Ireland) Ryan Caldwell to (England) Bath
- (United States) Paul Emerick to (England) Wasps
- (Ireland) Mark McCrea to (Ireland) Connacht
- (Ireland) Niall O'Connor to (Ireland) Connacht
- (Ireland) Tommy Seymour to (Scotland) Glasgow Warriors
- (Ireland) Jamie Smith to (Wales) Newport Gwent Dragons
- (Ireland) Bryan Young to (Italy) Cavalieri

Ulster Rugby squad
**Props**: (Ireland) **Tom Court** (21 apps, 18 starts, 15 pts); (New Zealand) **John Afoa** (17 apps, 17 starts, 5 pts); (Ireland) Paddy McAllister (21 apps, 9 starts); (Ireland) Declan Fitzpatrick (11 apps, 9 starts); (Ireland) Jerry Cronin (7 apps, 6 starts); (Ireland) Callum Black (9 apps, 2 starts); (Ireland) Adam Macklin (21 apps, 1 start, 5 pts); **Hookers**: (Ireland) **Rory Best** (13 apps, 13 starts, 5 pts); (Ireland) Nigel Brady (9 apps, 5 starts); (Ireland) Andi Kyriacou (5 apps, 3 starts); (Ireland) Niall Annett (2 apps); **Locks**: (Ireland) **Dan Tuohy** (28 apps, 27 starts, 15 pts); (Ireland) Lewis Stevenson (25 apps, 13 starts); (South Africa) **Johann Muller** (c) (18 apps, 18 starts, 5 pts); (Ireland) Tim Barker (9 apps, 3 starts); (Ireland) Neil McComb (5 apps, 2 starts); (Ireland) Iain Henderson (2 apps, 1 start, 5 pts)	**Back row**: (South Africa) **Pedrie Wannenburg** (25 apps, 25 starts, 20 pts); (Ireland) **Chris Henry** (24 apps, 24 starts, 10 pts); (Ireland) Willie Faloon (21 apps, 14 starts); (South Africa) Robbie Diack* (21 apps, 10 starts, 15 pts); (Ireland) **Stephen Ferris** (9 apps, 8 starts, 15 pts); (Ireland) Mike McComish (8 apps, 4 starts); (Ireland) Ali Birch (5 apps, 1 start); (Ireland) Conor Joyce (1 app); **Scrum-halves**: (South Africa) **Ruan Pienaar** (19 apps, 17 starts, 167 pts); (Ireland) Paul Marshall (24 apps, 16 starts, 20 pts); (Ireland) Ian Porter (5 apps); (Ireland) Blane McIlroy (2 apps); **Fly-halves**: (Ireland) Ian Humphreys (26 apps, 22 starts, 155 pts); (Ireland) Paddy Jackson (14 apps, 7 starts, 43 pts); (Ireland) James McKinney (2 apps, 1 start, 10 pts)	**Centres**: (Ireland) **Darren Cave** (21 apps, 20 starts, 25 pts); (Ireland) Nevin Spence (18 apps, 17 starts); (Ireland) **Ian Whitten** (20 apps, 14 starts, 5 pts); (Ireland) **Paddy Wallace** (15 apps, 14 starts, 15 pts); (Ireland) Luke Marshall (7 apps, 2 starts, 5 pts); (Ireland) Chris Farrell (2 apps, 1 start); (Ireland) Michael Allen (1 app, 1 start); (Ireland) Stuart Olding (1 app); **Wings**: (Ireland) **Craig Gilroy** (29 apps, 27 starts, 30 pts); (Ireland) **Andrew Trimble** (17 apps, 17 starts, 30 pts); (Scotland) **Simon Danielli** (7 apps, 5 starts); (Ireland) Chris Cochrane (3 apps, 2 starts, 10 pts); (Ireland) Conor Gaston (2 apps, 1 start); **Fullbacks**: (South Africa) **Stefan Terblanche** (17 apps, 15 starts, 15 pts); (Ireland) Adam D'Arcy* (26 apps, 13 starts, 15 pts); (New Zealand) Jared Payne (3 apps, 3 starts); (Ireland) Peter Nelson (2 apps, 1 start); (Ireland) Ricky Andrew (1 app)
(c) denotes the team captain, **Bold** denotes internationally capped players. Italics denotes academy players who appeared in the senior team.^{*} denotes players qualified to play for Ireland on residency or dual nationality. Players and their allocated positions from the Ulster Rugby website.

=== Academy squad ===
==== Players in ====
- (Ireland) Stuart Olding
- (Ireland) Chris Farrell
- (Ireland) Jonny Murphy
- (Ireland) Peter Nelson
- (Ireland) Ryan Jablonski
- (Ireland) David O'Mahony
- (Ireland) James Simpson
- (Ireland) Neil Faloon
- (Ireland) Conor Joyce
- (Ireland) Sean O'Connell

==== Players out ====
- (Ireland) Dominic Gallagher
- (Ireland) Stephen Lecky
- (Ireland) David McIlwaine to (England) Doncaster Knights

Position	Name	Nationality
High Performance Manager	Gary Longwell	Ireland
Elite Player Development Officer	Jonny Bell	Ireland
Elite Player Development Officer	Niall Malone	Ireland
Strength & Conditioning Coach	Chris Shiells	Ireland
Strength & Conditioning Coach	Kevin Geary	Ireland

Academy squad
**Props**: (Ireland) Ryan Jablonski (Instonians) (1); (Ireland) Conor Carey (Ballymena) (2); (Ireland) Kyle McCall (Ballynahinch) (2); **Hookers**: (Ireland) Jonny Murphy (Banbridge) (1); (Ireland) John Burns (Ballymena) (3); **Locks**: (Ireland) Iain Henderson (QUB) (2); (Ireland) David O'Mahony (TBA) (1); (Ireland) James Simpson (Ballynahinch) (1)	**Back row**: (Ireland) Ali Birch (Dungannon) (2); (Ireland) Neil Faloon (Armagh) (1); (Ireland) Conor Joyce (Malone) (1); (Ireland) David McGuigan (QUB) (2); (Ireland) Sean O'Connell (Instonians) (1); **Scrum-halves**: (Ireland) Blane McIlroy (Ballymena) (2); (Ireland) Michael Heaney (3); **Fly-halves**: (Ireland) Stuart Olding (Belfast Harlequins) (1)	**Centres**: (Ireland) Chris Farrell (Dungannon) (1); **Wings**: (Ireland) Michael Allen (Belfast Harlequins) (3); (Ireland) Chris Cochrane (Dungannon) (5); (Ireland) Conor Gaston (Dungannon) (3); **Fullbacks**: (Ireland) Ricky Andrew (Ballymena) (3); (Ireland) Peter Nelson (Dungannon) (1)

== Season record ==
Competition	Played	Won	Drawn	Lost	PF	PA	PD	TF	TA
2011-12 Heineken Cup	9	6	0	3	216	164	52	19	15
2011-12 Pro12	23	15	1	7	483	436	47	44	37
Total	32	21	1	10	699	600	99	63	52

== Heineken Cup ==
=== Pool 4 ===
Team	P	W	D	L	Tries for	Tries against	Try diff	Points for	Points against	Points diff	TB	LB	Pts
(France) Clermont Auvergne [5]	6	4	0	2	26	5	+21	215	69	+146	2	2	20
(Ireland) Ulster [8]	6	4	0	2	16	8	+8	158	87	+71	3	1	20
(England) Leicester Tigers	6	4	0	2	13	8	+5	123	117	+6	1	0	17
(Italy) Aironi	6	0	0	6	4	38	−34	51	274	−223	0	0	0

12 November 2011	Ulster (Ireland)	16 – 11	(France) Clermont Auvergne	Ravenhill, Belfast
15:40	Try: Humphreys 69' c Con: Humphreys (1/1); Pen: Humphreys (3/4) 12', 40', 50'	Report; Match centre Highlights; Full game	Try: Nakaitaci 5' m Pen: Skrela (2/2) 17', 38'	Attendance: 9,385; Referee: Wayne Barnes (England)
Ulster lineup: Ulster lineup: 1. Tom Court, 2. Rory Best, 3. John Afoa, 4. Johann Muller (c), 5. Dan Tuohy, 6. Stephen Ferris, 7. Chris Henry, 8. Pedrie Wannenburg, 9. Paul Marshall, 10. Ian Humphreys, 11. Craig Gilroy, 12. Paddy Wallace, 13. Darren Cave, 14. Andrew Trimble, 15. Simon Danielli.; Replacements: 16. Andi Kyriacou, 17. Paddy McAllister (for Court 67'), 18. Declan Fitzpatrick (for Afoa 67'), 19. Lewis Stevenson, 20. Willie Faloon (for Ferris 76'), 21. Ian Porter, 22. Nevin Spence, 23. Adam D'Arcy (for Danielli 55').				Attendance: 9,385; Referee: Wayne Barnes (England)

19 November 2011	Leicester Tigers (England)	20 – 9	(Ireland) Ulster	Welford Road, Leicester
18:00	Try: Smith 66' m Pen: Flood (5/6) 7', 16', 22', 45', 80'	Report; Match centre	Pen: Humphreys (3/4) 2', 10', 19'	Attendance: 21,473; Referee: Romain Poite (France)
Ulster lineup: 1. Tom Court, 2. Rory Best, 3. Declan Fitzpatrick, 4. Johann Muller (c), 5. Dan Tuohy, 6. Stephen Ferris, 7. Chris Henry, 8. Pedrie Wannenburg, 9. Paul Marshall, 10. Ian Humphreys, 11. Craig Gilroy, 12. Nevin Spence, 13. Darren Cave, 14. Andrew Trimble, 15. Simon Danielli.; Replacements: 16. Nigel Brady, 17. Paddy McAllister, 18. Adam Macklin (for Fitzpatrick 68'), 19. Lewis Stevenson, 20. Willie Faloon, 21. Ian Porter, 22. Paddy Jackson (for Humphreys 74'), 23. Adam D'Arcy (for Danielli 68').				Attendance: 21,473; Referee: Romain Poite (France)

9 December 2011	Ulster (Ireland)	31 – 10	(Italy) Aironi	Ravenhill, Belfast
19:30	Try: Ferris 16' c D'Arcy 40' m Trimble 42' m Marshall 56' c Jackson 68' c Con: Humphreys (3/5)	Report; Match centre	Try: D'Apice 78' c Con: Olivier (1/1); Pen: Tebaldi (1/3) 20'; Cards: Toniolatti (yellow card) 36'	Attendance: 7,494; Referee: Andrew Small (England)
Ulster lineup: 1. Paddy McAllister, 2. Rory Best, 3. John Afoa, 4. Johann Muller (c), 5. Dan Tuohy, 6. Stephen Ferris, 7. Chris Henry, 8. Pedrie Wannenburg, 9. Ruan Pienaar, 10. Ian Humphreys, 11. Craig Gilroy, 12. Nevin Spence, 13. Darren Cave, 14. Andrew Trimble, 15. Adam D'Arcy.; Replacements: 16. Andi Kyriacou, 17. Tom Court (for McAllister 50'), 18. Adam Macklin, 19. Lewis Stevenson, 20. Robbie Diack, 21. Paul Marshall (for Pienaar 50'), 22. Paddy Jackson (for Spence 53'), 23. Stefan Terblanche (for Trimble 50').				Attendance: 7,494; Referee: Andrew Small (England)

17 December 2011	Aironi (Italy)	20 – 46	(Ireland) Ulster	Stadio Luigi Zaffanella, Viadana
14:30	Try: Sinoti 56' c Quartaroli 60' m Biagi 74' m Con: Orquera (1/1); Pen: Orquera (1/1) 17'	Report; Match centre	Try: Trimble 5' c penalty try 22' c Court 37' c Gilroy 69' c Diack 77' c Macklin 80' m Con: Humphreys (3/3); Pienaar (2/3); Pen: Humphreys (2/2) 15', 33'	Attendance: 5,000; Referee: Greg Garner (England)
Ulster lineup: 1. Tom Court, 2. Rory Best, 3. John Afoa, 4. Johann Muller (c), 5. Dan Tuohy, 6. Stephen Ferris, 7. Chris Henry, 8. Pedrie Wannenburg, 9. Ruan Pienaar, 10. Ian Humphreys, 11. Craig Gilroy, 12. Nevin Spence, 13. Darren Cave, 14. Andrew Trimble, 15. Adam D'Arcy.; Replacements: 16. Nigel Brady (for Jackson 67'), 17. Paddy McAllister (for Court 49'), 18. Adam Macklin (for Afoa 78'), 19. Tim Barker (for Tuohy 61'), 20. Robbie Diack (for Wannenburg 65'), 21. Paul Marshall (for Humphreys 65'), 22. Paddy Jackson (for Spence 46'), 23. Stefan Terblanche (for Trimble 49').				Attendance: 5,000; Referee: Greg Garner (England)

13 January 2012	Ulster (Ireland)	41 – 7	(England) Leicester Tigers	Ravenhill, Belfast
20:00	Try: Trimble (2) 5' c, 39' m Gilroy 69' c P. Marshall 72' c Con: Pienaar (3/4); Pen: Pienaar (5/5) 11', 32', 53', 56', 63'	Report; Match centre	Try: Murphy 13' c Con: Twelvetrees (1/1); Cards: Cole (yellow card) 64'	Attendance: 11,900; Referee: Romain Poite (France)
Ulster lineup: 1. Tom Court, 2. Rory Best, 3. John Afoa, 4. Johann Muller (c), 5. Dan Tuohy, 6. Stephen Ferris, 7. Chris Henry, 8. Pedrie Wannenburg, 9. Ruan Pienaar, 10. Ian Humphreys, 11. Craig Gilroy, 12. Paddy Wallace, 13. Darren Cave, 14. Andrew Trimble, 15. Stefan Terblanche.; Replacements: 16. Nigel Brady (for Best 76'), 17. Callum Black (for Court 76'), 18. Adam Macklin (for Afoa 76'), 19. Lewis Stevenson (for Ferris 71'), 20. Willie Faloon (for Wannenburg 71'), 21. Paul Marshall (for Humphreys 65'), 22. Ian Whitten (for Cave 57'), 23. Adam D'Arcy.				Attendance: 11,900; Referee: Romain Poite (France)

21 January 2012	Clermont Auvergne (France)	19 – 15	(Ireland) Ulster	Stade Marcel-Michelin, Clermont-Ferrand
16:40	Try: Paulo 62' c Con: Parra (1/1); Pen: Parra (4/4) 14', 21', 48', 73'	Report; Match centre	Pen: Pienaar (5/7) 17', 32', 45', 56', 70'; Cards: Tuohy (yellow card) 14'	Attendance: 17,633; Referee: Dave Pearson (England)
Ulster lineup: 1. Tom Court, 2. Rory Best, 3. John Afoa, 4. Johann Muller (c), 5. Dan Tuohy, 6. Stephen Ferris, 7. Chris Henry, 8. Pedrie Wannenburg, 9. Ruan Pienaar, 10. Ian Humphreys, 11. Craig Gilroy, 12. Paddy Wallace, 13. Ian Whitten, 14. Andrew Trimble, 15. Stefan Terblanche.; Replacements: 16. Andi Kyriacou, 17. Callum Black, 18. Adam Macklin, 19. Lewis Stevenson, 20. Willie Faloon, 21. Paul Marshall (for Humphreys 61'), 22. Nevin Spence, 23. Adam D'Arcy.				Attendance: 17,633; Referee: Dave Pearson (England)

=== Quarter-final ===
8 April 2012	Munster (Ireland)	16–22	(Ireland) Ulster	Thomond Park, Limerick
13:45 IST	Try: Zebo 34' c Con: O'Gara (1/1); Pen: O'Gara (3/4) 40', 49', 61'	Report; Match centre	Try: Gilroy 16' c Con: Pienaar (1/1); Pen: Pienaar (4/5) 5', 11', 20', 59'; Drop: Humphreys (1/1) 32'; Cards: Henry (yellow card) 37'	Attendance: 26,500; Referee: Romain Poite (France)
Ulster lineup: 1. Tom Court, 2. Rory Best, 3. John Afoa, 4. Johann Muller (c), 5. Dan Tuohy, 6. Stephen Ferris, 7. Chris Henry, 8. Pedrie Wannenburg, 9. Ruan Pienaar, 10. Ian Humphreys, 11. Craig Gilroy, 12. Paddy Wallace, 13. Darren Cave, 14. Andrew Trimble, 15. Stefan Terblanche.; Replacements: 16. Nigel Brady, 17. Paddy McAllister, 18. Adam Macklin, 19. Lewis Stevenson, 20. Willie Faloon, 21. Paul Marshall, 22. Nevin Spence, 23. Adam D'Arcy.				Attendance: 26,500; Referee: Romain Poite (France)

=== Semi-finals ===
28 April 2012	Ulster (Ireland)	22–19	(Scotland) Edinburgh	Aviva Stadium, Dublin
17:45 IST	Try: Wannenburg 15' c Con: Pienaar (1/1); Pen: Pienaar (5/5) 5', 38', 58', 63', 75'; Cards: Terblanche (yellow card) 29'	Report; Match centre	Try: Thompson 80' c Con: Laidlaw (1/1); Pen: Laidlaw (4/4) 9', 11', 40', 45'	Attendance: 45,147; Referee: Romain Poite (France)
Ulster lineup: 1. Tom Court, 2. Rory Best, 3. Declan Fitzpatrick, 4. Johann Muller (c), 5. Dan Tuohy, 6. Stephen Ferris, 7. Willie Faloon, 8. Pedrie Wannenburg, 9. Ruan Pienaar, 10. Paddy Jackson, 11. Craig Gilroy, 12. Paddy Wallace, 13. Darren Cave, 14. Andrew Trimble, 15. Stefan Terblanche.; Replacements: 16. Nigel Brady, 17. Paddy McAllister (for Court 77'), 18. Adam Macklin (for Fitzpatrick 65'), 19. Lewis Stevenson (for Ferris 77'), 20. Robbie Diack (for Faloon 73'), 21. Paul Marshall, 22. Ian Humphreys, 23. Adam D'Arcy.				Attendance: 45,147; Referee: Romain Poite (France)

=== Final ===
19 May 2012	Leinster (Ireland)	42–14	(Ireland) Ulster	Twickenham Stadium, London
17:00 BST	Try: O'Brien 12' c Healy 31' c penalty try 44' c van der Merwe 76' m Cronin 80' c Con: Sexton (3/3); McFadden (1/2); Pen: Sexton (3/4) 51', 67', 73'	Report; Match centre	Try: Tuohy 60' m Pen: Pienaar (3/3) 7', 40', 49'; Cards: Terblanche (yellow card) 72'	Attendance: 81,774; Referee: Nigel Owens (Wales)
Ulster lineup: 1. Tom Court, 2. Rory Best, 3. John Afoa, 4. Johann Muller (c), 5. Dan Tuohy, 6. Stephen Ferris, 7. Chris Henry, 8. Pedrie Wannenburg, 9. Ruan Pienaar, 10. Paddy Jackson, 11. Craig Gilroy, 12. Paddy Wallace, 13. Darren Cave, 14. Andrew Trimble, 15. Stefan Terblanche.; Replacements: 16. Nigel Brady, 17. Paddy McAllister (for Court 74'), 18. Declan Fitzpatrick, 19. Lewis Stevenson (for Tuohy 79'), 20. Willie Faloon (for Henry 67'), 21. Paul Marshall (for Humphreys 69'), 22. Ian Humphreys (for Jackson 45'), 23. Adam D'Arcy (for Trimble 79').				Attendance: 81,774; Referee: Nigel Owens (Wales)

== Pro12 ==
Pro12 Table
Pos	Team	Pld	W	D	L	PF	PA	PD	TF	TA	TB	LB	Pts	Qualification (Note: Qualification for the Heineken Cup is based on each country's allocation, i.e. three highest-ranked Irish teams, three highest-ranked Welsh teams, both Italian teams and both Scottish teams. Because Leinster won the 2012 Heineken Cup Final, Ireland earned an extra Heineken Cup place, which will go to Connacht. Aironi were denied a licence for the 2012–13 season due to financial issues; the newly established Zebre side replaced Aironi in the Pro12 and Heineken Cup.)
1	(Ireland) Leinster (F)	22	18	1	3	568	326	+242	48	28	5	2	81	Play-off place
2	(Wales) Ospreys (C)	22	16	1	5	491	337	+154	44	22	2	3	71	Play-off place
3	(Ireland) Munster (SF)	22	14	1	7	489	367	+122	45	27	5	4	67	Play-off place
4	(Scotland) Glasgow Warriors (SF)	22	13	4	5	445	321	+124	34	23	2	3	65	Play-off place
5	(Wales) Scarlets	22	12	2	8	446	373	+73	43	30	5	5	62	
6	(Ireland) Ulster	22	12	0	10	474	424	+50	53	41	5	3	56	
7	(Wales) Cardiff Blues	22	10	0	12	446	460	−14	43	45	5	5	50	
8	(Ireland) Connacht	22	7	1	14	321	433	−112	27	36	0	7	37	
9	(Wales) Newport Gwent Dragons	22	7	1	14	370	474	−104	27	41	1	5	36	
10	(Italy) Benetton Treviso	22	7	0	15	419	558	−139	41	57	3	5	36	
11	(Scotland) Edinburgh	22	6	1	15	454	588	−134	42	65	2	4	32	
12	(Italy) Aironi	22	4	0	18	289	551	−262	22	54	1	5	22	

Updated to match(es) played on 5 May 2012. Source: RaboDirect PRO12
Rules for classification: If teams are level at any stage, tiebreakers are applied in the following order:
1. number of matches won;
2. the difference between points for and points against;
3. the number of tries scored;
4. the most points scored;
5. the difference between tries for and tries against;
6. the fewest red cards received;
7. the fewest yellow cards received.
  (C) Champions; (F) Lost in the final; (SF) Lost in the semi-finals
  Notes:

2 September 2011	Ulster (Ireland)	28 – 14	(Scotland) Glasgow Warriors	Ravenhill, Belfast
19:05	Try: Cave; Henry; Marshall; Con: Humphreys (2); Pen: Humphreys (3)	Report; Match centre	Try: Nathan; Pen: Weir (3)	Attendance: 6,296; Referee: Leighton Hodges
Ulster lineup: 1. Paddy McAllister, 2. Andi Kyriacou, 3. Jerry Cronin, 4. Lewis Stevenson, 5. Dan Tuohy, 6. Pedrie Wannenberg, 7. Willie Faloon, 8. Chris Henry, 9. Paul Marshall, 10. Ian Humphreys, 11. Ian Whitten, 12. Nevin Spence, 13. Darren Cave, 14. Craig Gilroy, 15. Adam D'Arcy.; Replacements: 16. Nigel Brady (for Kyriacou 67'), 17. Jarlath Carey, 18. Adam Macklin, 19. Neil McComb, 20. Robbie Diack, 21. Ian Porter, 22. Paddy Jackson, 23. Peter Nelson.				Attendance: 6,296; Referee: Leighton Hodges

10 September 2011	(1 BP) Aironi (Italy)	19 – 25	(Ireland) Ulster	Stadio Luigi Zaffanella, Viadana
15:00	Try: Williams; Con: Olivier; Pen: Olivier (4)	Report; Match centre	Try: Gilroy; Tuohy; Whitten; Con: Humphreys (2); Pen: Humphreys (2); Cards: Cronin (yellow card)	Attendance: 3,000; Referee: Neil Hennessy
Ulster lineup: 1. Paddy McAllister, 2. Andi Kyriacou, 3. Jerry Cronin, 4. Tim Barker, 5. Dan Tuohy, 6. Pedrie Wannenburg, 7. Willie Faloon, 8. Chris Henry, 9. Paul Marshall, 10. Ian Humphreys, 11. Ian Whitten, 12. Nevin Spence, 13. Darren Cave, 14. Craig Gilroy, 15. Adam D'Arcy.; Replacements: 16. Nigel Brady (for Kyriacou 50'), 17. Declan Fitzpatrick (for McAllister 50'), 18. Adam Macklin (for Wannenburg 79'), 19. Lewis Stevenson (for Barker 56'), 20. Robbie Diack (for Faloon 61'), 21. Ian Porter, 22. Paddy Jackson (for Humphreys 78'), 23. Luke Marshall (for Spence 65').				Attendance: 3,000; Referee: Neil Hennessy

16 September 2011	Ulster (Ireland)	20 – 3	(Wales) Cardiff Blues	Ravenhill, Belfast
19:05	Try: Cave (2); Con: Humphreys (2); Pen: Humphreys; Jackson	Report; Match centre	Pen: Sweeney; Cards: Rush (yellow card)	Attendance: 6,555; Referee: James Jones
Ulster lineup: 1. Declan Fitzpatrick, 2. Andi Kyriacou, 3. Jerry Cronin, 4. Lewis Stevenson, 5. Dan Tuohy, 6. Pedrie Wannenburg, 7. Chris Henry, 8. Robbie Diack, 9. Paul Marshall, 10. Ian Humphreys, 11. Ian Whitten, 12. Nevin Spence, 13. Darren Cave, 14. Craig Gilroy, 15. Jared Payne.; Replacements: 16. Nigel Brady (for Kyriacou 64'), 17. Paddy McAllister (for Fitzpatrick 52'), 18. Adam Macklin (for Cronin 79'), 19. Neil McComb (for Tuohy 79'), 20. Mike McComish (for Diack 64'), 21. Ian Porter (for P. Marshall 67'), 22. Paddy Jackson (for Humphreys 74'), 23. Adam D'Arcy (for Cave 41').				Attendance: 6,555; Referee: James Jones

25 September 2011	Ospreys (Wales)	32 – 14	(Ireland) Ulster	Liberty Stadium, Swansea
16:30	Try: Penalty try Fussell; Con: Biggar; Morgan; Pen: Biggar (6); Cards: Hibbard (yellow card)	Report; Match centre	Try: Jackson; Penalty try Con: Jackson; McKinney; Cards: Diack (yellow card)	Attendance: 5,590; Referee: Dudley Phillips
Ulster lineup: 1. Declan Fitzpatrick, 2. Andi Kyriacou, 3. Jerry Cronin, 4. Lewis Stevenson, 5. Dan Tuohy, 6. Pedrie Wannenburg, 7. Chris Henry, 8. Robbie Diack, 9. Paul Marshall, 10. Paddy Jackson, 11. Ian Whitten, 12. Luke Marshall, 13. Nevin Spence, 14. Craig Gilroy, 15. Jared Payne.; Replacements: 16. Nigel Brady (for Kyriacou 56'), 17. Paddy McAllister (for Fitzpatrick 52'), 18. Adam Macklin (for Tuohy 66'), 19. Tim Barker (for Wannenburg 66'), 20. Willie Faloon (for Diack 58'), 21. Blane McIlroy (for P. Marshall 67'), 22. James McKinney (for Jackson 76'), 23. Adam D'Arcy (for Payne 53').				Attendance: 5,590; Referee: Dudley Phillips

30 September 2011	Newport Gwent Dragons (Wales)	22 – 9	(Ireland) Ulster	Rodney Parade, Newport
19:05	Try: Riley; Con: Tovey; Pen: Tovey (4)	Report; Match centre	Pen: Jackson (3); Cards: Spence (yellow card)	Attendance: 4,554; Referee: Neil Paterson
Ulster lineup: 1. Declan Fitzpatrick, 2. Nigel Brady, 3. Jerry Cronin, 4. Lewis Stevenson, 5. Dan Tuohy, 6. Pedrie Wannenburg, 7. Willie Faloon, 8. Chris Henry, 9. Paul Marshall, 10. Paddy Jackson, 11. Ian Whitten, 12. Luke Marshall, 13. Nevin Spence, 14. Craig Gilroy, 15. Adam D'Arcy.; Replacements: 16. Andy Kyriacou, 17. Kyle McCall, 18. Adam Macklin, 19. Tim Barker (for Stevenson 52'), 20. Robbie Diack (for Faloon 53'), 21. Ian Porter (for P. Marshall 47'), 22. James McKinney, 23. Conor Gaston.				Attendance: 4,554; Referee: Neil Paterson

7 October 2011	Ulster (Ireland)	12 – 23	(Italy) Benetton Treviso	Ravenhill, Belfast
19:05	Try: Wannenburg (2); Con: Humphreys	Report; Match centre	Try: Penalty try Burton; Con: Burton (2); Pen: Burton (3); Cards: Fitzpatrick (yellow card)	Attendance: 7,372; Referee: Stefano Penne
Ulster lineup: 1. Declan Fitzpatrick, 2. Andi Kyriacou, 3. Jerry Cronin, 4. Tim Barker, 5. Dan Tuohy, 6. Pedrie Wannenburg, 7. Mike McComish, 8. Chris Henry, 9. Paul Marshall, 10. Ian Humphreys, 11. Ian Whitten, 12. Nevin Spence, 13. Darren Cave, 14. Craig Gilroy, 15. Jared Payne.; Replacements: 16. Nigel Brady (for Kyriacou 65'), 17. Kyle McCall, 18. Adam Macklin, 19. Lewis Stevenson (for Barker 54'), 20. Robbie Diack (for McComish 68'), 21. Ian Porter, 22. Paddy Jackson (for Whitten 41'), 23. Adam D'Arcy 15').				Attendance: 7,372; Referee: Stefano Penne

29 October 2011	Scarlets (Wales)	24 – 17	(Ireland) Ulster (1 BP)	Parc y Scarlets, Llanelli
15:00	Try: Trimble; Pen: Humphreys (4); Cards: Adam Macklin (yellow card)	Report; Match centre	Try: Williams; Warren; Con: Thomas; Pen: Thomas (3); Newton	Attendance: 7,075; Referee: Alan Falzone
Ulster lineup: 1. Tom Court, 2. Rory Best, 3. John Afoa, 4. Johann Muller, 5. Dan Tuohy, 6. Stephen Ferris, 7. Chris Henry, 8. Pedrie Wannenburg, 9. Paul Marshall, 10. Ian Humphreys, 11. Craig Gilroy, 12. Nevin Spence, 13. Darren Cave, 14. Andrew Trimble, 15. Adam D'Arcy.; Replacements: 16. Nigel Brady (for Best 70'), 17. Paddy McAllister (for Court 54'), 18. Adam Macklin (for Afoa 70'), 19. Lewis Stevenson (for Tuohy 54'), 20. Robbie Diack (for Henry 70'), 21. Ruan Pienaar (for P. Marshall 63'), 22. Paddy Jackson (for Humphreys 70'), 23. Ian Whitten (for Spence 60').				Attendance: 7,075; Referee: Alan Falzone

5 November 2011	Ulster (Ireland)	22 – 3	(Ireland) Connacht	Ravenhill, Belfast
17:35	Try: Gilroy; Court; Humphreys; Con: Humphreys (2); Pen: Humphreys	Report; Match centre	Pen: Nikora	Attendance: 6,887; Referee: John Lacey
Ulster lineup: 1. Tom Court, 2. Rory Best, 3. John Afoa, 4. Johann Muller, 5. Dan Tuohy, 6. Stephen Ferris, 7. Chris Henry, 8. Pedrie Wannenburg, 9. Paul Marshall, 10. Ian Humphreys, 11. Craig Gilroy, 12. Paddy Wallace, 13. Darren Cave, 14. Andrew Trimble, 15. Simon Danielli.; Replacements: 16. Andi Kyriacou, 17. Paddy McAllister, 18. Adam Macklin, 19. Lewis Stevenson, 20. Robbie Diack (for Ferris 59'), 21. Ian Porter (for P. Marshall 59'), 22. Nevin Spence, 23. Adam D'Arcy.				Attendance: 6,887; Referee: John Lacey

25 November 2011	Glasgow Warriors (Scotland)	17 – 9	(Ireland) Ulster	Firhill Stadium, Glasgow
19:35	Try: Nathan; Pen: Weir (3); Drop: Weir	Report; Match centre	Pen: Humphreys (3)	Attendance: 3,940; Referee: Stefano Penne
Ulster lineup: 1. Tom Court, 2. Andi Kyriacou, 3. Declan Fitzpatrick, 4. Johann Muller, 5. Dan Tuohy, 6. Robbie Diack, 7. Willie Faloon, 8. Pedrie Wannenburg, 9. Paul Marshall, 10. Ian Humphreys, 11. Simon Danielli, 12. Nevin Spence, 13. Darren Cave, 14. Andrew Trimble, 15. Adam D'Arcy.; Replacements: 16. Nigel Brady (for Kyriacou 70'), 17. Callum Black, 18. Adam Macklin (for Fitzpatrick 63), 19. Tim Barker (for Tuohy 70'), 20. Mike McComish, 21. Ian Porter, 22. Paddy Jackson, 23. Ian Whitten (for Danielli 57').				Attendance: 3,940; Referee: Stefano Penne

2 December 2011	Ulster (Ireland)	24 – 17	(Wales) Scarlets (1 BP)	Ravenhill, Belfast
19:05	Try: Ferris (2); Con: Humphreys; Pen: Humphreys (4)	Report; Match centre	Try: Lamont; Longi; Murphy; Con: Jones; Cards: Evans (yellow card)	Attendance: 8,117; Referee: Alain Rolland
Ulster lineup: 1. Tom Court, 2. Rory Best, 3. John Afoa, 4. Johann Muller, 5. Dan Tuohy, 6. Stephen Ferris, 7. Chris Henry, 8. Pedrie Wannenburg, 9. Paul Marshall, 10. Ian Humphreys, 11. Craig Gilroy, 12. Nevin Spence, 13. Darren Cave, 14. Andrew Trimble, 15. Adam D'Arcy.; Replacements: 16. Nigel Brady (for Best 70'), 17. Paddy McAllister (for Court 54'), 18. Adam Macklin (for Afoa 70'), 19. Lewis Stevenson (for Tuohy 54'), 20. Robbie Diack (for Henry 70'), 21. Ruan Pienaar (for P. Marshall 63'), 22. Paddy Jackson (for Humphreys 70'), 23. Ian Whitten.				Attendance: 8,117; Referee: Alain Rolland

26 December 2011	(1 BP) Leinster (Ireland)	42 – 13	(Ireland) Ulster	RDS Arena, Dublin
17:30	Try: Carr; Cronin; Auva'a; Penalty try Madigan; Hagan; Con: McFadden (6)	Report; Match centre	Try: Cochrane; Con: McKinney; Pen: McKinney (2)	Attendance: 18,500; Referee: Peter Fitzgibbon
Ulster lineup: 1. Callum Black, 2. Nigel Brady, 3. Adam Macklin, 4. Tim Barker, 5. Lewis Stevenson, 6. Neil McComb, 7. Ali Birch, 8. Robbie Diack, 9. Paul Marshall, 10. James McKinney, 11. Conor Gaston, 12. Chris Farrell, 13. Michael Allen, 14. Chris Cochrane, 15. Peter Nelson.; Replacements: 16. Niall Annett (for Brady 74'), 17. Jerry Cronin (for Black 68'), 18. Tom Court (for Macklin 40'), 19. James Simpson (for Joyce 74'), 20. Conor Joyce (for Barker 21'), 21. Ian Porter (for P. Marshall 68'), 22. Stuart Olding (for McKinney 68'), 23. Ricky Andrew.				Attendance: 18,500; Referee: Peter Fitzgibbon

30 December 2011	(1 BP) Ulster (Ireland)	33 – 17	(Ireland) Munster	Ravenhill, Belfast
19:05	Try: Terblanche; Afoa; Humphreys; Pienaar; Con: Humphreys (2); Pen: Humphreys (2); Pienaar	Report; Match centre	Try: O'Dea; Murphy; Con: Keatley (2); Pen: Keatley	Attendance: 11,379; Referee: Alain Rolland
Ulster lineup: 1. Paddy McAllister, 2. Andi Kyriacou, 3. John Afoa, 4. Johann Muller, 5. Dan Tuohy, 6. Chris Henry, 7. Willie Faloon, 8. Pedrie Wannenburg, 9. Ruan Pienaar, 10. Ian Humphreys, 11. Stefan Terblanche, 12. Ian Whitten, 13. Darren Cave, 14. Craig Gilroy, 15. Adam D'Arcy.; Replacements: 16. Nigel Brady (for Kyriacou 58'), 17. Callum Black (for McAllister 63'), 18. Adam Macklin (for Afoa 75'), 19. Lewis Stevenson (for Tuohy 63'), 20. Ali Birch (for Faloon 73'), 21. Paul Marshall (for Humphreys 68'), 22. Chris Farrell (for Cave 64'), 23. Peter Nelson (for D'Arcy 73').				Attendance: 11,379; Referee: Alain Rolland

6 January 2012	Edinburgh (Scotland)	20 – 42	(Ireland) Ulster (1 BP)	Murrayfield Stadium, Edinburgh
19:30	Try: De Luca; Walker; Con: Laidlaw (2); Pen: Laidlaw (2)	Report; Match centre	Try: Best; Tuohy; Trimble; Cave; Con: Pienaar (2); Pen: Humphreys (2); Pienaar (4)	Attendance: 3,792; Referee: George Clancy
Ulster lineup: 1. Tom Court, 2. Rory Best, 3. John Afoa, 4. Johann Muller, 5. Dan Tuohy, 6. Stephen Ferris, 7. Chris Henry, 8. Pedrie Wannenburg, 9. Ruan Pienaar, 10. Ian Humphreys, 11. Craig Gilroy, 12. Ian Whitten, 13. Darren Cave, 14. Andrew Trimble, 15. Stefan Terblanche.; Replacements: 16. Andi Kyriacou (for Best 70'), 17. Callum Black (for Court 77'), 18. Adam Macklin (for Afoa 77'), 19. Lewis Stevenson (for Tuohy 70'), 20. Willie Faloon (for Wannenburg 11'), 21. Paul Marshall (for Humphreys 21'), 22. Paddy Wallace (for Whitten 60'), 23. Adam D'Arcy (for Gilroy 75').				Attendance: 3,792; Referee: George Clancy

10 February 2012	(1 BP) Ulster (Ireland)	30 – 12	(Wales) Newport Gwent Dragons	Ravenhill, Belfast
19:05	Try: Diack; Pienaar; Gilroy; Terblanche; Con: Pienaar (2); Pen: Pienaar (2); Cards: Whitten (yellow card); Faloon (yellow card)	Report; Match centre	Pen: Tovey (4)	Attendance: 7,435; Referee: Carlo Damasco
Ulster lineup: 1. Callum Black, 2. Andi Kyriacou, 3. John Afoa, 4. Lewis Stevenson, 5. Dan Tuohy, 6. Mike McComish, 7. Willie Faloon, 8. Robbie Diack, 9. Ruan Pienaar, 10. Ian Humphreys, 11. Stefan Terblanche, 12. Nevin Spence, 13. Ian Whitten, 14. Craig Gilroy, 15. Adam D'Arcy.; Replacements: 16. Nigel Brady (for Kyriacou 55'), 17. Paddy McAllister (for Black 48'), 18. Adam Macklin, 19. Tim Barker (for Stevenson 73'), 20. Ali Birch (for Faloon 64'), 21. Paul Marshall (for Humphreys 64'), 22. Michael Allen, 23. Simon Danielli (for D'Arcy 57').				Attendance: 7,435; Referee: Carlo Damasco

17 February 2012	Cardiff Blues (Wales)	21 – 14	(Ireland) Ulster (1 BP)	Cardiff Arms Park, Cardiff
19:05	Try: Parks; James; Con: Parks; Pen: Parks (3)	Report; Match centre	Try: Diack; Pen: Pienaar (3); Cards: Humphreys (yellow card)	Attendance: 9,154; Referee: George Clancy
Ulster lineup: 1. Tom Court, 2. Nigel Brady, 3. John Afoa, 4. Lewis Stevenson, 5. Dan Tuohy, 6. Chris Henry, 7. Robbie Diack, 8. Willie Faloon, 9. Ruan Pienaar, 10. Ian Humphreys, 11. Ian Whitten, 12. Paddy Wallace, 13. Nevin Spence, 14. Craig Gilroy, 15. Stefan Terblanche.; Replacements: 16. Andi Kyriacou (for Brady 66'), 17. Paddy McAllister (for Court 53'), 18. Adam Macklin, 19. Tim Barker, 20. Mike McComish (for Diack 75'), 21. Paul Marshall (for Humphreys 75'), 22. Simon Danielli, 23. Adam D'Arcy (for Terblanche 61').				Attendance: 9,154; Referee: George Clancy

24 February 2012	Ulster (Ireland)	15 – 14	(Wales) Ospreys (1 BP)	Ravenhill, Belfast
19:05	Try: Penalty try Wallace; Con: Pienaar; Pen: Pienaar	Report; Match centre	Try: Bearman; Walker; Con: Biggar; Cards: Biggar (yellow card)	Attendance: 8,131; Referee: Neil Hennessy
Ulster lineup: 1. Paddy McAllister, 2. Andi Kyriacou, 3. John Afoa, 4. Lewis Stevenson, 5. Dan Tuohy, 6. Chris Henry, 7. Willie Faloon, 8. Pedrie Wannenburg, 9. Paul Marshall, 10. Ruan Pienaar, 11. Ian Whitten, 12. Paddy Wallace, 13. Nevin Spence, 14. Craig Gilroy, 15. Stefan Terblanche.; Replacements: 16. Nigel Brady (for Kyriacou 72'), 17. Callum Black (for McAllister 72'), 18. Adam Macklin, 19. Tim Barker (for Stevenson 70'), 20. Robbie Diack (for Wannenburg 53'), 21. Ian Humphreys, 22. Simon Danielli (for Gilroy 63'), 23. Adam D'Arcy (for Danielli 73').				Attendance: 8,131; Referee: Neil Hennessy

2 March 2012	(1 BP) Ulster (Ireland)	38 – 16	(Scotland) Edinburgh	Ravenhill, Belfast
19:05	Try: Marshall; Terblanche; D'Arcy; Penalty try Cochrane; Humphreys; Con: Pienaar (4)	Report; Match centre	Try: S. Visser; T. Visser; Pen: Godman (2)	Attendance: 8,044; Referee: Nigel Owens
Ulster lineup: 1. Paddy McAllister, 2. Andi Kyriacou, 3. John Afoa, 4. Lewis Stevenson, 5. Dan Tuohy, 6. Pedrie Wannenburg, 7. Willie Faloon, 8. Robbie Diack, 9. Paul Marshall, 10. Ruan Pienaar, 11. Stefan Terblanche, 12. Paddy Wallace, 13. Ian Whitten, 14. Craig Gilroy, 15. Adam D'Arcy.; Replacements: 16. Nigel Brady (for Kyriacou 52'), 17. Callum Black (for McAllister 51'), 18. Adam Macklin (for Afoa 64'), 19. Neil McComb (for McComish 46'), 20. Mike McComish (for Wannenburg 12'), 21. Ian Humphreys (for P. Marshall 52'), 22. Luke Marshall (for Whitten 70'), 23. Chris Cochrane (for D'Arcy 60').				Attendance: 8,044; Referee: Nigel Owens

24 March 2012	(1 BP) Benetton Treviso (Italy)	23 – 27	(Ireland) Ulster	Stadio Comunale di Monigo, Treviso
16:15	Try: Ceccato; Di Bernardo; Con: Burton (2); Pen: Burton; Drop: Burton	Report; Match centre	Try: Henry; Wallace; D'Arcy; Con: Pienaar (3); Pen: Pienaar	Attendance: 4,200; Referee: Leighton Hodges
Ulster lineup: 1. Tom Court, 2. Andi Kyriacou, 3. John Afoa, 4. Johann Muller, 5. Dan Tuohy, 6. Chris Henry, 7. Willie Faloon, 8. Robbie Diack, 9. Ruan Pienaar, 10. Ian Humphreys, 11. Stefan Terblanche, 12. Paddy Wallace, 13. Darren Cave, 14. Craig Gilroy, 15. Adam D'Arcy.; Replacements: 16. Nigel Brady (for Kyriacou 51'), 17. Paddy McAllister (for Court 60'), 18. Adam Macklin, 19. Lewis Stevenson (for Muller 58'), 20. Neil McComb, 21. Paul Marshall, 22. Ian Whitten (for Cave 61'), 23. Nevin Spence (for Stevenson 61').				Attendance: 4,200; Referee: Leighton Hodges

30 March 2012	(1 BP) Ulster (Ireland)	45 – 7	(Italy) Aironi	Ravenhill, Belfast
19:05	Try: Wallace; Penalty try Best; Cave; Court; Wannenburg; Con: Pienaar (4); Humphreys (2); Pen: Pienaar	Report; Match centre	Try: Tibaldi; Con: Olivier; Cards: Toniolatti (yellow card)	Attendance: 10,125; Referee: Neil Paterson
Ulster lineup: 1. Tom Court, 2. Rory Best, 3. John Afoa, 4. Johann Muller, 5. Lewis Stevenson, 6. Stephen Ferris, 7. Chris Henry, 8. Pedrie Wannenburg, 9. Ruan Pienaar, 10. Ian Humphreys, 11. Craig Gilroy, 12. Paddy Wallace, 13. Darren Cave, 14. Andrew Trimble, 15. Stefan Terblanche.; Replacements: 16. Nigel Brady (for Best 64'), 17. Paddy McAllister (for Afoa 54'), 18. Adam Macklin (for Court 72'), 19. Dan Tuohy (for Stevenson 54'), 20. Willie Faloon, 21. Paul Marshall, 22. Ian Whitten (for Cave 60'), 23. Adam D'Arcy (for Wallace 64').				Attendance: 10,125; Referee: Neil Paterson

14 April 2012	Connacht (Ireland)	26 – 21	(Ireland) Ulster (1 BP)	Galway Sportsgrounds, Galway
17:15	Try: Nikora; Duffy; Tiernan O'Halloran; Con: Nikora; Pen: Nikora (3); Cards: Loughney (yellow card); Swift (yellow card)	Report; Match centre	Try: Marshall; Jackson; Con: Jackson; Pen: Jackson (3); Cards: Stevenson (yellow card); Birch (yellow card)	Attendance: 5,017; Referee: Dudley Phillips
Ulster lineup: 1. Paddy McAllister, 2. Nigel Brady, 3. Adam Macklin, 4. Lewis Stevenson, 5. Neil McComb, 6. Mike McComish, 7. Willie Faloon, 8. Robbie Diack, 9. Paul Marshall, 10. Ian Humphreys, 11. Adam D'Arcy, 12. Paddy Jackson, 13. Nevin Spence, 14. Ian Whitten, 15. Stefan Terblanche.; Replacements: 16. Andi Kyriacou (for Brady 68'), 17. Callum Black (for McAllister 68'), 18. Adam Macklin (for Court 56'), 19. Iain Henderson (for McComb 74'), 20. Ali Birch (for Diack 55'), 21. Ruan Pienaar (for P. Marshall 37'), 22. Michael Allen, 23. Craig Gilroy (for Humphreys 56').				Attendance: 5,017; Referee: Dudley Phillips

20 April 2012	Ulster (Ireland)	8 – 16	(Ireland) Leinster	Ravenhill, Belfast
19:05	Try: Laughlin; Con: Sexton; Pen: Sexton; Drop: Sexton	Report; Match centre	Try: Muller; Pen: Pienaar	Attendance: 10,500; Referee: John Lacey
Ulster lineup: 1. Tom Court, 2. Nigel Brady, 3. Declan Fitzpatrick, 4. Johann Muller, 5. Lewis Stevenson, 6. Chris Henry, 7. Willie Faloon, 8. Pedrie Wannenburg, 9. Ruan Pienaar, 10. Paddy Jackson, 11. Craig Gilroy, 12. Paddy Wallace, 13. Darren Cave, 14. Andrew Trimble, 15. Stefan Terblanche.; Replacements: 16. Andi Kyriacou (for Brady 60'), 17. Paddy McAllister (for Court 60'), 18. Adam Macklin (for Fitzpatrick 55'), 19. Neil McComb (for Wannenburg 49'), 20. Robbie Diack (for Henry 17'), 21. Ian Porter (for Pienaar 67'), 22. Ian Humphreys (for Trimble 75'), 23. Adam D'Arcy (for Wallace 33').				Attendance: 10,500; Referee: John Lacey

5 May 2012	(1 BP) Munster (Ireland)	36 – 8	(Ireland) Ulster	Thomond Park, Limerick
19:30	Try: Zebo; O'Mahony; Sherry; Archer; O'Donnell; Con: Deasy (2); Cusack; Pen: Deasy	Report; Match centre	Try: Henderson; Pen: Jackson	Attendance: 19,362; Referee: Alain Rolland
Ulster lineup: 1. Paddy McAllister, 2. Nigel Brady, 3. Declan Fitzpatrick, 4. Lewis Stevenson, 5. Dan Tuohy, 6. Iain Henderson, 7. Willie Faloon, 8. Robbie Diack, 9. Paul Marshall, 10. Paddy Jackson, 11. Chris Cochrane, 12. Ian Whitten, 13. Nevin Spence, 14. Andrew Trimble, 15. Adam D'Arcy.; Replacements: 16. Niall Annett (for Brady 65'), 17. Callum Black (for Fitzpatrick 55'), 18. Tom Court (for McAllister 12'), 19. Mike McComish (for Diack 55'), 20. Ali Birch (for Faloon 48'), 21. Blane McIlroy (for P. Marshall 60'), 22. Ian Humphreys (for Trimble 51'), 23. Craig Gilroy (for D'Arcy 64').				Attendance: 19,362; Referee: Alain Rolland

=== End-of-season awards ===
2011–2012 Dream Team

Pos		Player	Team
SH	9	(South Africa) Ruan Pienaar	Ulster
LL	4	(Ireland) Dan Tuohy	Ulster
TP	3	(South Africa) BJ Botha	Ulster

== Home attendance ==
Domestic League					European Cup					Total	
League	Fixtures	Average Attendance	Highest	Lowest	League	Fixtures	Average Attendance	Highest	Lowest	Total Attendance	Average Attendance
2011–12 Pro12	11	8,258	11,379	6,296	2011–12 Heineken Cup	3	9,593	11,900	7,494	119,620	8,544

== Friendlies ==
10 August 2011	Bayonne (France)	40-3	(Ireland) Ulster	Stade Jean-Dauger, Bayonne
		Report	Pen: McKinney
Ulster lineup: 1. Tom Court, 2. Andi Kyriacou, 3. Declan Fitzpatrick, 4. Tim Barker, 5. Neil McComb, 6. Pedrie Wannenburg, 7. Chris Henry (c), 8. Robbie Diack, 9. Paul Marshall, 10. James McKinney, 11. Ricky Andrew, 12. Ian Whitten, 13. Darren Cave, 14. Conor Gaston, 15. Adam D'Arcy.; Replacements: Callum Black, Paddy McAllister, Adam Macklin, Jerry Cronin, John Burns, Lewis Stevenson, Mike McComish, Willie Faloon, Ian Porter, Paddy Jackson, Graig Gilroy.

19 August 2011	Neath (Wales)	15-34	(Ireland) Ulster	The Gnoll, Neath
	Try: Burns; Gilroy; Diack; McIlroy; Nelson; Con: Jackson (3); Pen: Jackson	Report	Try: (2); Con: (1); Pen: (1)
Ulster lineup: 1. Paddy McAllister, 2. John Burns, 3. Adam Macklin, 4. Lewis Stevenson (c), 5. Neil McComb, 6. Mike McComish, 7. Willie Faloon, 8. Robbie Diack, 9. Stuart Olding, 10. Paddy Jackson, 11. Craig Gilroy, 12. Luke Marshall, 13. Chris Farrell, 14. Michael Allen, 15. Peter Nelson.; Replacements: Andrew Warwick, Callum Black, Declan Fitzpatrick, James Simpson, Ali Birch, Blane McIlroy, Conor Gaston.

26 August 2011	Ulster (Ireland)	22-5	(England) Harlequins	Ravenhill, Belfast
	Try: Gilroy; P. Marshall; Faloon; Con: Humphreys (2); Pen: Humphreys	Report	Try: Dickson
Ulster lineup: 1. Paddy McAllister, 2. Andi Kyriacou, 3. Jerry Cronin, 4. Lewis Stevenson, 5. Neil McComb, 6. Pedrie Wannenburg, 7. Willie Faloon, 8. Chris Henry (c), 9. Paul Marshall, 10. Ian Humphreys, 11. Craig Gilroy, 12. Nevin Spence, 13. Darren Cave, 14. Conor Gaston, 15. Adam D'Arcy.; Replacements: Ian Whitten (for Spence 50'), Tim Barker (for Stevenson 50'), Callum Black (for McAllister 55'), Dan Tuohy (for McComb 61'), Paddy Jackson (for Humphreys 61'), Robbie Diack (for Wannenburg 72'), Peter Nelson (for Gaston 72'), Ian Porter (for P. Marshall 72'), Luke Marshall (for Cave 78'), Adam Macklin (for Cronin 79').

== Ulster Women ==
=== 2011-12 Women's Interprovincial Series ===
	Team	P	W	D	L	PF	PA	BP	Pts
1	Leinster	3	3	0	0	62	8	0	12
2	Munster	3	2	0	1	51	55	1	9
3	Ulster	3	1	0	2	30	56	2	6
4	Connacht	3	0	0	3	30	54	3	3

3 September 2011	Ulster	3-26	Leinster	Ravenhill, Belfast

10 September 2011	Munster	18-12	Ulster	Dooradoyle, Limerick

17 September 2011	Ulster	15-12	Connacht	Ballymoney RFC

== Ulster Rugby Awards ==
The Ulster Rugby Awards ceremony was held at the Culloden Hotel on 10 May 2012. Winners were:

- Ulster Player of the Year: Chris Henry
- Ulster Rugby Personality of the Year: Stephen Ferris
- Young Player of the Year: Craig Gilroy
- Supporters Club Player of the Year: Pedrie Wannenburg
- Academy Player of the Year: Chris Farrell
- Most Improved Player of the Year: Paul Marshall
- Dorrington B. Faulkner Award: John Wilson
- Youth Player of the Year: Russell Blair
- Schools Player of the Year: James Harrison
- Club Player of the Year: Richard Lutton
- Club of the Year: Malone RFC
