= Heineken Cup 2012 =

Heineken Cup 2012 may refer to:

- 2011–12 Heineken Cup competition
- 2012–13 Heineken Cup competition
- 2012 Heineken Cup Final, the final of the 2011–12 Heineken Cup competition
