= 2012 Heineken Cup final =

2012 Heineken Cup Final
- Event: 2011–12 Heineken Cup
Leinster	Ulster
42	14
- Date: 19 May 2012
- Venue: Twickenham Stadium, London
- Man of the Match: Seán O'Brien (Leinster)
- Referee: Nigel Owens (Wales)
- Attendance: 81,774

The 2012 Heineken Cup Final was the final match of the 2011–12 Heineken Cup, the 17th season of Europe's top club rugby union competition. The match was played on 19 May 2012 at Twickenham Stadium in London, England. The final was between Ulster and defending champions Leinster.

It was the first all-Ireland final in the competitions history, and the fifth all-nation final after 2003, 2005, 2007, and 2010. Ireland became the third, and most recent, nation to have achieved an all-nation final after France and England.

Leinster triumphed, with captain Leo Cullen becoming the first person to raise the trophy three times. Leinster became just the second team in the competition to win back-to-back finals after the Leicester Tigers' 2001–2002 final victories. The match broke many records, including the largest winning-margin in a Heineken Cup final and the most points scored by the winning team, both of which still stand as of 24 August 2026. It led to media reports suggesting Leinster were the greatest European club team of all time.

== Background ==
It was confirmed on 1 May that the match was an 82,000 sell-out. 7,500 tickets were assigned to each province for the final with a Leinster spokesman saying that demand for tickets had outstripped supply with Ulster selling their remaining tickets to new 2012–13 season ticket holders.

Under rules of the competition organiser, European Rugby Cup (ERC), the winner of the Heineken Cup Final receives an automatic place in the following year's competition, apart from the normal allocation for the winning team's country. If the champion is already qualified through performance in its domestic or regional league, the cup holder's place (normally) passes to another team from its country. Because Leinster and Ulster had already qualified for the 2012–13 Heineken Cup by their performance in Pro12, the fourth Irish place passed to Connacht. Leinster, the first team since Toulouse (in 2005) to make back-to-back finals, stood to become the second team, and first since Leicester in 2002, to win back-to-back titles.

== Match ==
=== Summary ===
Leinster beat Ulster by five tries to one. Leinster flanker Seán O'Brien and prop Cian Healy scored first half tries and the team scored a penalty try early in the second half. Leinster's replacement prop Heinke van der Merwe and Seán Cronin both scored tries late on and Fergus McFadden converted Cronin's try, completing the largest winning margin in a Heineken Cup final. Leinster fly-half Johnny Sexton scored 15 points in total (from three conversions and three penalties).

The result represented both a record winning points total and a record winning margin for a Heineken Cup Final. Leinster become only the second team to defend the title successfully and the first to win it three times in four years. Leo Cullen became the first captain to raise the trophy three times.

=== Details ===
19 May 2012
17:00 BST

Leinster	42–14	Ulster
Try: O'Brien 12' c Healy 31' c Penalty try 44' c van der Merwe 76' m Cronin 80' c Con: Sexton (3/3); McFadden (1/2); Pen: Sexton (3/4) 51', 67', 73'	Report	Try: Tuohy 60' m Pen: Pienaar (3/3) 7', 40', 49'

Twickenham Stadium, London
Attendance: 81,774
Referee: Nigel Owens (Wales)

Leinster	Ulster

FB	15	Rob Kearney
RW	14	Fergus McFadden
OC	13	Brian O'Driscoll
IC	12	Gordon D'Arcy
LW	11	Isa Nacewa
FH	10	Johnny Sexton
SH	9	Eoin Reddan
N8	8	Jamie Heaslip
OF	7	Seán O'Brien
BF	6	Kevin McLaughlin
RL	5	Brad Thorn
LL	4	Leo Cullen (c)
TP	3	Mike Ross
HK	2	Richardt Strauss
LP	1	Cian Healy
Substitutions:
HK	16	Seán Cronin
PR	17	Heinke van der Merwe
PR	18	Nathan White
LK	19	Devin Toner
FL	20	Shane Jennings
SH	21	John Cooney
FH	22	Ian Madigan
CE	23	Dave Kearney
Coach:
Joe Schmidt

FB	15	Stefan Terblanche
RW	14	Andrew Trimble
OC	13	Darren Cave
IC	12	Paddy Wallace
LW	11	Craig Gilroy
FH	10	Paddy Jackson
SH	9	Ruan Pienaar
N8	8	Pedrie Wannenburg
OF	7	Chris Henry
BF	6	Stephen Ferris
RL	5	Dan Tuohy
LL	4	Johann Muller (c)
TP	3	John Afoa
HK	2	Rory Best
LP	1	Tom Court
Substitutions:
HK	16	Nigel Brady
PR	17	Paddy McAllister
PR	18	Declan Fitzpatrick
LK	19	Lewis Stevenson
FL	20	Willie Faloon
SH	21	Paul Marshall
FH	22	Ian Humphreys
CE	23	Adam D'Arcy
Coach:
Brian McLaughlin

Touch judges:
Romain Poite
Jérôme Garcès
Television match official:
Jim Yuille

== See also ==
- 2011–12 Heineken Cup
