= Tamaiti =

Tamaiti is a given name. Notable people with the given name include:

- Tamaiti Horua (born 1981), Australian rugby union player
- Tamaiti Williams (born 2000), New Zealand rugby union player
- Tamaiti Willie Star (1926–2007), Nauruan diplomat and politician

== See also ==
- Tāme Iti (born 1952), Māori activist and artist
