= Antonio Denti =

- Born: 29 November 1990 (age 35) Parma, Italy
- Height: 1.81 m (5 ft 11 in)
- Weight: 108 kg (238 lb; 17 st 0 lb)
- Notable relative: Andrea Denti (brother)

Rugby union career
- Position: Hooker or Prop
- Current team: Viadana
Youth career
- Viadana
Senior career
| Years | Team | Apps | (Points) |
| 2008−2010 | F.I.R. Academy | - | (-) |
| 2010−2011 | Gran Ducato Parma | 5 | (0) |
| 2011−2012 | Aironi | 2 | (0) |
| 2012− | Viadana | | |
- Correct as of 12 June 2020
International career
| Years | Team | Apps | (Points) |
| 2009−2010 | Italy Under 20 | 7 | (5) |
- Correct as of 12 June 2020

Antonio Denti (Parma, 29 November 1990) is an Italian rugby union player. His usual position is as a Hooker or Prop and he currently plays for Viadana in Top12.

For 2011–12 Celtic League season, he played for Aironi in the Pro 12 league.

In 2009 and 2010, Denti was also named in the Italy Under 20.
