= Jamie Smith (rugby union) =

Northern Irish rugby union player (born 1988)

- Born: Jamie Smith; June 25, 1988 (age 38) Ballymena, Northern Ireland
- Height: 178 cm (5 ft 10 in)
- Weight: 86 kg (13 st 8 lb)
- School: Cambridge House Grammar School, Campbell College Belfast

Rugby union career
- Position: Full back
Senior career
Years	Team	Apps	(Points)
2009-2011	Ulster	17	(15)
2011–2013	NG Dragons	6	(0)
- Correct as of 11:31, 29 Oct 2011 (UTC)

Jamie Smith (born 25 June 1988) is a retired rugby union player from Ballymena, Northern Ireland, who progressed through the Ulster Academy. His usual position was Full back.

== Rugby career ==
Smith was voted Ulster Young Player of the Year in 2009. In September 2011 he joined Newport Gwent Dragons. He was released by Newport Gwent Dragons at the end of the 2012–13 season due to a career ending injury.

Jamie is now Director of Rugby at Ballymena RFC. He is overseeing a transitional period where the club is experiencing generational change. This sees the club remain in division 2A, having utilised a young squad throughout the season with inexperienced coaching staff.
