= Michael Allen (rugby union) =

Irish rugby union player

- Born: 28 November 1990 (age 35) Belfast, Northern Ireland
- Height: 1.83 m (6 ft 0 in)
- Weight: 98.8 kg (15 st 8 lb)
- School: Methodist College Belfast

Rugby union career
- Position(s): Wing, Centre
Amateur team(s)
Years	Team	Apps	(Points)
- Belfast Harlequins
Senior career
Years	Team	Apps	(Points)
2011–2015	Ulster	48	(30)
2015–2017	Edinburgh	31	(30)
- Correct as of 24 May 2015
International career
Years	Team	Apps	(Points)
2013/2014	Emerging Ireland	4	(5)
- Correct as of 10 February 2015

Michael Allen (born 28 November 1990) from Belfast is a retired Irish rugby union player. He played at both centre and wing for Ulster and Edinburgh.

== Early life ==
Allen was educated at Methodist College Belfast. He twice won the Ulster Schools' Cup, scoring several tries in the 2009 Semi-Final as the school won the cup two years running, beating Regent House in 2008 and R.B.A.I in 2009. He attended his first rugby match at only two weeks old to watch his father play for what is now Belfast Harlequins and spent his childhood at the club. Allen's mother, Corinne, is a former Northern Ireland Netball international and his sister also excelled at the sport.

== Professional ==
Allen represented Ulster Rugby at Under 18, Under 19 level and Academy level. He also played for the Ulster Ravens in the British and Irish Cup Semi-Final in 2010 against Munster A. He made his Ulster first team debut against Leinster at The RDS in 2012 and was awarded with a Senior Ulster Contract in 2013. In the 2012–13 season, Allen scored his first senior Ulster try against Cardiff Blues and was named on the bench for the Final, coming on in the 64th minute in the 24–18 defeat to Leinster.

In the 2013–14 season, Allen made his breakthrough playing Wing due to injuries to Tommy Bowe and Andrew Trimble, scoring a try against Connacht and two against Treviso. He has spoken about the competition he faces at wing with Bowe, Trimble and Craig Gilroy, who are all Ireland Internationals, saying "Obviously they're three world class players but I can't dwell on that. I have to try and make the most of the game time that I get but at the same time I recognise how tough it is. My priority is to play well enough to ensure that Mark (Anscombe, Ulster coach) has a decision to make each week."

He moved to Edinburgh in 2015, and played there for two seasons. After learning he was not to be offered a new contract at the end of the 2016-17 season, he decided to retire from rugby and focus on his family and his career as a financial adviser.

== International ==
Allen represented Ireland Schools at under-19 Level.

In 2013, Allen was selected for the Emerging Ireland squad to play at the 2013 IRB Tbilisi Cup in Georgia where he scored a try in a 19–8 defeat to South Africa President's XV. Emerging Ireland beat Uruguay 42–33 on 16 June 2013 to secure a second-place finish in the tournament. At the end of the 2014 season Allen was selected for the Emerging Ireland squad which travelled to Romania.
