= Stephen Ferris =

Rugby union player from Northern Ireland

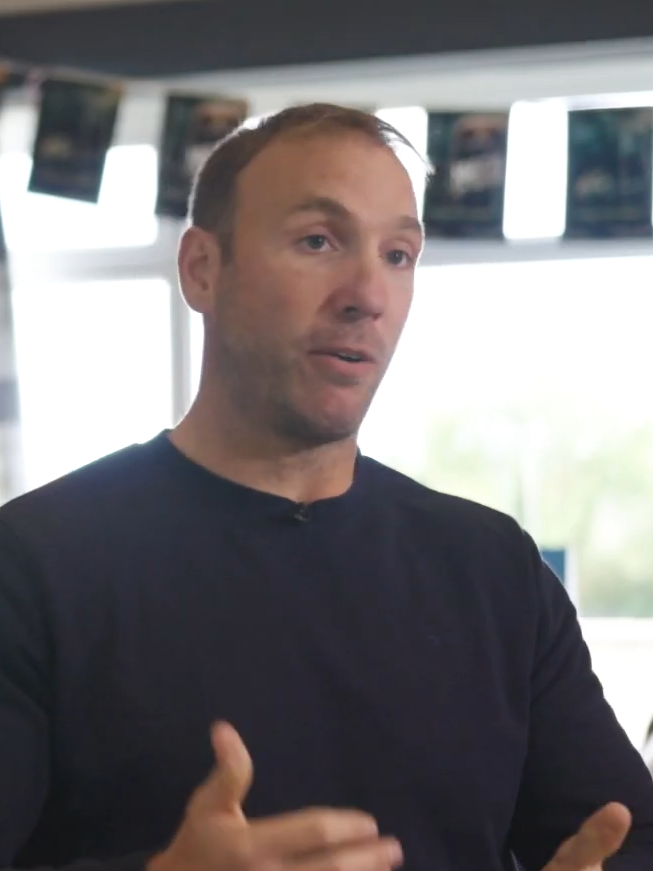
- Ferris in 2023
- Born: 2 August 1985 (age 41) Maghaberry, Northern Ireland
- Height: 6 ft 4 in (1.93 m)
- Weight: 116 kg (18 st 4 lb)
- School: Friends' School, Lisburn

Rugby union career
- Position: Blindside Flanker
Provincial / State sides
Years	Team	Apps	(Points)
2005–2014	Ulster	106	(60)
- Correct as of 3 June 2014
International career
Years	Team	Apps	(Points)
2006–08	Ireland A	3	(0)
2006–12	Ireland	35	(10)
2009	British & Irish Lions	0	(0)
- Correct as of 18 March 2012

Stephen Ferris (born 2 August 1985) is a retired Irish rugby union player who played for Ulster and represented Ireland internationally. Ferris played club rugby with Dungannon. He is from Maghaberry and attended Friends' School Lisburn. He played for Ulster and Ireland in all three backrow positions. Ferris retired from rugby in June 2014 after a long-standing ankle injury ended his career.

== Ulster ==
Ferris graduated from the Ulster Academy and joined Ulster Rugby on a development contract at the start of the 2005–06 season. He was named in the Ireland Under-20 Rugby World Cup Squad in 2005. He made his Ulster debut against Border Reivers in October 2005. Going into the 2011–12 season, Ulster and Ferris shone on the European stage with the Irish side putting in a memorable 41–7 win over Leicester at Ravenhill during the Heineken Cup group stages. Despite injury, Ferris performed valiantly earning man of the match honours during Ulster's Heineken cup quarter final victory over Munster. Due to his strong performances Ferris was nominated for the ERC European Player of the Year 2012. Ulster ended up losing to Leinster in the 2012 Heineken Cup Final, 42–14. Ferris last played against Edinburgh in November 2012, due to an ankle injury he sustained. This injury prevented a potentially lucrative move to Japan. He remained at Ulster on a short-term contract as he underwent rehabilitation, before returning against the Scarlets on the 14 March 2014 where he came off the bench to a standing ovation after a 15-month absence. Ulster went on to win the Scarlets match 26–13. Unfortunately, the injury recurred forcing Ferris's retirement in June 2014, aged 28.

== Ireland ==
Ferris made his full Ireland debut against Pacific Islanders in November 2006. Ferris was selected for the Ireland Rugby World Cup squad in 2007 but was an unused reserve at the tournament. Injury ruled Ferris out of the 2008 Six Nations, but good early season form for Ulster saw him rewarded with three further caps during Ireland's end of year campaign. He earned his fifth Irish cap against Australia in June 2008.

He retained his place for the following year's Six Nations and started all five matches as Declan Kidney's side clinched the Grand Slam, although he was forced off with a blood injury after 7 minutes of the deciding match against Wales.

Following the 2009 Lions tour Ferris made his international return for Ireland in the autumn series later the same year and featured strongly in the hard-fought draw with Australia and the impressive victory over South Africa, 15–10. Ferris played in four of Ireland's 2010 Six Nations matches, but missed the 2010 Summer Tour through injury. However, he made his international comeback during the 2010 November Tests, scoring his first international try against New Zealand at the new Landsdowne Road, and scoring his second against Argentina. He missed the 2011 Six Nations, and the latter half of the 2010/2011 season through injury, but returned for Ireland against France on 20 August during a 2011 Rugby World Cup warm-up test, having been included in Ireland's training squad for the 2011 World Cup. Ireland eventually bowed out to Wales in the quarter-finals.

== British & Irish Lions ==
Ferris was selected as part of the 2009 British & Irish Lions tour to South Africa.

He scored his first Lions try on 3 June, against the Golden Lions but was forced to withdraw from the squad on Tuesday 9 June after he tore the medial collateral ligament in his right knee during a training session. He was replaced by Wales captain Ryan Jones.

== Honours ==
=== Ulster ===
- Celtic League (1): 2005–06

=== Ireland ===
- Six Nations (1): 2009
