= Adam Macklin =

Irish rugby union player

- Born: 26 July 1989 (age 37) Belfast, County Antrim, Northern Ireland
- Height: 6 ft 1 in (1.85 m)
- Weight: 114 kg (251 lb)
- School: Methodist College Belfast

Rugby union career
- Position: Prop
- Current team: Houston SaberCats
Youth career
- Belfast Harlequins
Senior career
Years	Team	Apps	(Points)
2014–17	Rotherham Titans	2	(0)
2017–2018	Houston SaberCats	8	(0)
Provincial / State sides
Years	Team	Apps	(Points)
2010–14	Ulster	31	(5)

Adam Macklin (born 26 July 1989) from Belfast is a rugby union footballer. He previously played at the position of prop for the Houston SaberCats of Major League Rugby.

== Early life ==
Macklin lived in County Antrim in Northern Ireland. He was educated at Methodist College Belfast. Macklin captained the Methodist College Belfast Ulster Schools' Cup winning team in 2008 playing at Number 8, including scoring a try in the final.

In 2010, Macklin was awarded an Ulster Rugby development contract. However, an ankle injury picked up playing for the Ravens in October 2010 effectively ruled him out for the season.

== Ulster ==
Macklin made his first appearance for Ulster against Aironi on 19 September 2011. Macklin scored his first try for Ulster on 17 December 2011, finishing off a 46–20 win against Aironi in the Heineken Cup. He was rewarded for a series of fine substitute appearances with his first start on 26 December 2011 against Leinster. Macklin came on as a substitute in the 22–19 win against Edinburgh to reach the Heineken Cup final.

Ulster lost the final in a 42–14 defeat to three-time champions Leinster Rugby. Macklin did not feature in that match because coach Brian McLaughlin favoured Declan Fitzpatrick.

== Houston ==
In the Summer of 2017 Adam announced he was reuniting with former Ulster teammate Justin Fitzpatrick, who managed the Major League Rugby Houston SaberCats. Seen as a controversial move amongst some local fans, who voiced concerns via social media of a desire to see more American props nourished at Houston.

== Buckfast Bowl ==
In three years in the Buckfast Bowl Fantasy Football League, Adam has been the one to watch. In 2021, he is projected to win it all.
