= Tamaiti Horua =

Australian rugby union player (born 1981)

- Born: 27 March 1981 (age 45) Nelson, New Zealand
- Height: 6 ft 3 in (191 cm)
- Weight: 241 lb (109 kg)
- School: St Kevin's College

Rugby union career
- Position: Back-row
Senior career
Years	Team	Apps	(Points)
2006–07	Toyota Verblitz		
Provincial / State sides
Years	Team	Apps	(Points)
2009–10	Ulster	4	(0)
Super Rugby
Years	Team	Apps	(Points)
2002–05	Brumbies	31	(25)
2008–09	Western Force	19	(20)

Tamaiti Horua (born 27 March 1981) is an Australian former professional rugby union player.

Born in Nelson, Horua left New Zealand aged five and grew up in Melbourne, attending St Kevin's College.

Horua, a loose forward, captained Australia at the 2002 Under-21 World Championship in South Africa and made several Australia "A" appearances during his career. He competed for the ACT Brumbies from 2002 to 2005, then had a spell in Japanese professional rugby with Toyota Verblitz. On his return to Australia, Horua played two seasons at the Western Force, before signing with Ulster for another overseas stint.
