= Chris Cochrane =

American football player (born 1969)

No. 8
- Position: Quarterback

Personal information
- Born: June 6, 1969 (age 57); Bronxville, New York, U.S.
- Listed height: 6 ft 2 in (1.88 m)
- Listed weight: 228 lb (103 kg)

Career information
- High school: Scarsdale (Scarsdale, New York)
- College: Cornell (1987–1990)
- NFL draft: 1991: undrafted

Career history
- Minnesota Vikings (1991)*; Ohio Glory (1992)*; Frankfurt Galaxy (1992); Minnesota Vikings (1992)*
- * Offseason or practice squad member only

Christopher P. Cochrane (born June 6, 1969) is an American former football quarterback. He played college football for the Cornell Big Red and professionally for the Frankfurt Galaxy of the World League of American Football (WLAF).

== Early life ==
Christopher P. Cochrane was born on June 6, 1969, in Bronxville, New York. He attended Scarsdale High School in Scarsdale, New York.

== College career ==
Cochrane was a member of the Cornell Big Red of Cornell University from 1987 to 1990. He played in seven games as a sophomore in 1988, completing 12 of 27 passes for 196 yards, one touchdown, and one interception. He was a two-year starter from 1989 to 1990. In 1989, Cochrane totaled 115 completions on 236 attempts (48.7%) for 1,322 yards, five touchdowns, and 21 interceptions while also rushing for 87 yards and three touchdowns. As a senior in 1990, he completed 107 of 175 passes (61.1%) for 1,266 yards, five touchdowns, and five interceptions while running for 387 yards.

== Professional career ==
Cochrane reportedly had an impressive performance at the NFL Combine. He signed with the Minnesota Vikings in April 1991 after going undrafted in the 1991 NFL draft. He was released on August 20, 1991.

On February 4, 1992, Cochrane was selected by the Ohio Glory of the World League of American Football (WLAF) in the 14th round, with the 154th overall pick, of the 1992 WLAF draft. He began the 1992 WLAF season on the Glory's practice squad. On April 17, 1992, he was signed by the WLAF's Frankfurt Galaxy. Cochrane completed 62 of 112 passes (55.4%) for 818 yards, five touchdowns, and six interceptions for the Galaxy during the 1992 season. He also scored one rushing touchdown.

On June 10, 1992, after the WLAF season had ended, Cochrane signed with the Vikings again. He was later released on August 15, 1992.
