= Dan Tuohy =

Ireland international rugby union player

- Born: Daniel Tuohy; 18 June 1985 (age 41) Bristol, England
- Height: 1.96 m (6 ft 5 in)
- Weight: 119 kg (18 st 10 lb)
- School: Hartpury College

Rugby union career
- Position: Lock
- Current team: Vannes
Amateur team(s)
Years	Team	Apps	(Points)
- Weston-super-Mare
Senior career
Years	Team	Apps	(Points)
2007–2008	Gloucester	2	(0)
2008–2009	Exeter Chiefs	0	(0)
2009–2016	Ulster	136	(70)
2016–2018	Bristol	8	(0)
2017	→Leicester (loan)	5	(0)
2018	Stade Français	5	(0)
2018–	Vannes	29	(5)
- Correct as of 1 June 2020
International career
Years	Team	Apps	(Points)
2009–2014	Ireland Wolfhounds	4	(0)
2010–2015	Ireland	11	(5)
2016	Barbarians	1	(0)
- Correct as of 15 August 2015

Dan Tuohy (born 18 June 1985) is an English-born Ireland international rugby union player, currently playing for Vannes after leaving Stade Français. He plays as a lock. He also captained the Barbarians in their 2016 tour against the Czech Republic.

== Club career ==
Tuohy started rugby on the wing for Weston-super-Mare Colts before becoming a second row forward. He made his first professional appearance for Gloucester against London Irish in the Guinness Premiership and received the man of the match award. In May 2012, he scored Ulster's only try in the 14–42 defeat to Leinster in the Heineken Cup Final.

On 30 September 2017 Tuohy joined Leicester on a three-month loan, making his debut on 7 October against London Irish. Tuohy recently departed Bristol Rugby and is now signed to Stade Français, making his debut on 11 March 2018.

== International career ==
In May 2010, Tuohy was named in the 33-man squad for Ireland's summer tour to New Zealand and Australia. He played for Ireland in the non-cap match against the Barbarians on 4 June 2010.

On 12 June 2010, Tuohy made his test debut, coming on in the first half of the game against New Zealand in New Plymouth. Ireland lost the game by 66–28, with Tuohy scoring a try in the first minute after coming on. In 2014, he was called up to replace Paul O'Connell in Ireland's home Six Nations game against Scotland. He helped Ireland to a 22-point victory over the Scots and started on the bench for Ireland's next home game against Wales. His appearance as a substitute in that game was cut short with a broken forearm.
