= Niall Annett =

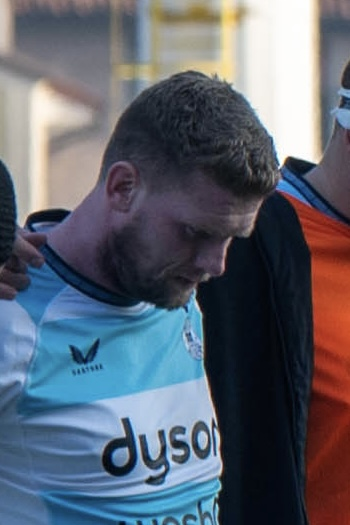
- Annett ahead of Bath Rugby's match against Benetton Treviso, December 2024
- Born: Niall Annett; 7 May 1991 (age 35) Belfast, Northern Ireland
- Height: 1.85 m (6 ft 1 in)
- Weight: 106 kg (16.7 st)
- School: Methodist College Belfast

Rugby union career
- Position: Hooker
- Current team: Bath
Senior career
Years	Team	Apps	(Points)
2011–2014	Ulster	20	(0)
2014–2022	Worcester Warriors	132	(60)
2022–2025	Bath	68	(65)
- Correct as of 25 May 2025
International career
Years	Team	Apps	(Points)
2010–2011	Ireland u20	18	(30)
2013–2014	Emerging Ireland	4	(10)
–	Barbarians		
- Correct as of 10 Feb 2015
Coaching career
- Years: Team
- 2025-: Ulster (elite player development officer)

Niall Annett (born 7 May 1991) is an Irish rugby union coach and former player who played hooker for Ulster, Worcester Warriors and Bath. As of the summer of 2025 he is an elite player development officer with the Ulster academy.

Annett captained Methodist College Belfast's Ulster Schools' Cup-winning side in 2009, and the Ireland under-20s at the 2011 IRB Junior World Championship. He graduated from the Ulster academy, making his debut against Leinster in December 2011.

He left Ulster in 2014, joining Worcester Warriors. On 1 March 2022, Bath Rugby announced that Annett would be joining the club from the start of the 2022/23 season. He retired at the end of the 2024-25 season, and returned to Ulster as an elite player development officer.

In 2014, he was called up to the Barbarians squad to play against Leicester Tigers.
