= Ian Whitten =

Irish rugby union player

- Born: 5 June 1987 (age 39) Lisburn, Northern Ireland
- Height: 6 ft 2 in (1.88 m)
- Weight: 16 st (224 lb; 102 kg)
- School: Wallace High School
- University: Queen's University Belfast

Rugby union career
- Position: Centre
- Current team: Instonians Belfast
Amateur team(s)
Years	Team	Apps	(Points)
2005–2006	Queen's University Instonains RFC		
Senior career
Years	Team	Apps	(Points)
2012–2023	Exeter Chiefs	271	(155)
- Correct as of 20 December 2020
Provincial / State sides
Years	Team	Apps	(Points)
2008–2012	Ulster	63	(25)
- Correct as of 28 January 2014
International career
Years	Team	Apps	(Points)
2011	Wolfhounds	1	(0)
2009	Ireland	2	(10)
- Correct as of 9 Feb 2015

Ian Whitten (born 5 June 1987) is a former Irish rugby union player for Exeter in Premiership Rugby. He was capped by Ireland on their 2009 tour to North America when he lined out against Canada on 23 May 2009. He plays as a centre. He retired in 2023.

== Ulster ==
A former pupil of Wallace High School, Whitten was recruited to the Phoenix Ulster Rugby Academy in 2007, having already represented Ireland at U18 and U19 levels.

The 2008–9 season was the real breakthrough season for Whitten with his first senior Ulster cap coming against Stade Francais in the Heineken Cup and he went on to establish himself in the side for the rest of the season. This culminated in a call-up to the Ireland squad for the summer tour of USA and Canada, where he won two senior caps.

== Exeter Chiefs ==
It was announced on 8 March 2012 that Whitten would be joining English Premiership Rugby side Exeter Chiefs for the 2012–2013 season. Whitten was involved in 16 games in his debut season with the Chiefs and was also involved in the Chiefs maiden Heineken Cup campaign. Whitten established himself as a strong contender in the centers for the Chiefs with his good lines of running and strong defensive play. He started the final as Exeter Chiefs defeated Wasps to be crowned champions of the 2016–17 English Premiership. Whitten won a second Premiership and a European Cup with Chiefs in 2018–19.
