= Willie Faloon =

Irish rugby union player (born 1986)

- Born: William Faloon; 30 September 1986 (age 40) Armagh, Northern Ireland
- Height: 1.82 m (5 ft 11 1/2 in)
- Weight: 97 kg (15 st 4 lb)
- School: Royal School Armagh
- University: University of Ulster

Rugby union career
- Position: Flanker
Amateur team(s)
Years	Team	Apps	(Points)
- Ballynahinch
Senior career
Years	Team	Apps	(Points)
2008–2012	Ulster	63	(15)
2012–2015	Connacht	39	(30)
2015–2016	Ulster	4	(0)
- Correct as of 19 March 2023
International career
Years	Team	Apps	(Points)
2011	Ireland Wolfhounds	2	(5)
- Correct as of 10 February 2015

Willie Faloon (born 30 September 1986) is a rugby union coach and former player from Northern Ireland. Since 2025, he has been defence and contact skills coach with Ulster, having formerly been head coach at City of Armagh RFC, an Elite Performance Development Officer with the Ulster academy, and defence coach and head coach for the Ireland under-20 team. As a player, he played openside flanker for Ulster and Connacht.

== Career ==
=== Playing career ===
Faloon first played rugby at Keady Primary School, before attending the Royal School, Armagh, with whom he won the Ulster Schools' Cup in 2004. After leaving school, he joined Ballynahinch RFC, making his debut in the All-Ireland League in 2005. He joined the Ulster academy, representing the province at under-21 and 'A' level, before signing his first contract with the province in 2008. He made his senior debut against Stade Français Paris in the Heineken Cup in January 2009, and his league debut against Scarlets in the final game of the 2008–09 Celtic League.

He played in 13 games in the 2009–10 Celtic League, starting 12 of them, and scored his first try for the team against Scarlets on 2 October 2009. In European competition Faloon played in 4 games, starting 3 of them and scoring a try against Bath. In the 2010–11 Celtic League, Faloon played in 17 games for Ulster as they climbed from their 8th-place finish the previous season to finish sixth and qualify for the play-offs. In that season's Heineken Cup Faloon played in six of the team's seven games, including coming on as a replacement in Ulster's quarter-final against Northampton Saints in Stadium mk. In the 2020-11 season, he played in 16 games in Pro 12, as Ulster finished sixth. In the 2011–12 Heineken Cup, he played five, with four of these appearances coming as a replacement. He came on from the bench against Leinster in the final.

In the summer of 2012, Faloon joined Connacht on a 2-year deal. He played in 14 games in the 2012–13 Pro 12 and scored three tries. He made his European debut for Connacht against Zebre in the 2012–13 Heineken Cup, and played 3 times for the team in the competition, starting in each game. At the end of his first year with the side, the Connacht Clan, the team's supporters club, voted him as their player of the season. He played three seasons at Connacht, making 39 appearances and scoring six tries, and represented the Ireland Wolfhounds.

He returned to Ulster on a one-year deal for the 2015-16 season, and made four appearances.

=== Coaching career ===
Faloon's coaching career began with City of Armagh RFC in 2015, initially as forwards coach, before becoming head coach in 2017, leading them to three Ulster Senior Cup titles. He also joined the coaching team of the Royal School, Armagh, leading them to the Ulster Schools' Cup final in 2020. In 2021 he joined the staff of the Ulster academy as Elite Performance Development Officer with responsibility for coaching forwards. He was named defence coach of the Ireland under-20 team for the 2022 under-20 Six Nations. he was head coach of the Ireland under-20s for the 2024 World Championship. He became interim defence coach for Ulster in February 2025 following the departure of Jonny Bell, and was appointed defence and contact skills coach for the following season.
