= Ali Birch =

Irish rugby union player

Alistair Birch
- Born: 13 October 1988 (age 38)
- Height: 1.88 m (6 ft 2 in)
- Weight: 90 kg (14 st; 200 lb)

Rugby union career
- Position: Flanker
Amateur team(s)
Years	Team	Apps	(Points)
- Dungannon RFC
2016-17	City of Armagh RFC		
Senior career
Years	Team	Apps	(Points)
2009–13	Ulster	10	(5)
2013-16	Rotherham Titans	64	(45)
- Correct as of 3 August 2022

Ali Birch (born 13 October 1988) is an Irish rugby union coach and former player. He played at flanker, for Ulster and Rotherham Titans professionally, and at amateur level for Dungannon RFC and City of Armagh RFC. After retiring as a player following a series of concussions in 2017, he became City of Armagh's assistant forwards coach.

Birch was educated at Royal School Armagh, and played club rugby for Dungannon, where he was tipped as a future Ulster player by former IRFU president Andy Crawford. He was selected for the Ulster Ravens for a friendly against the Ireland u20s in January 2010, and also played for the Ravens in the British and Irish Cup. He made an appearance from the bench for the Ulster senior team in their final match of the 2009–10 Celtic League. At the end of the 2009-10 season he was nominated for the Ken Goodall Award for outstanding club player of the year for his performances with Dungannon. He was named in the Ulster academy for 2010-11. His first senior start came against Leinster in December 2011, and he made four more substitute appearances during the rest of the 2011-12 season. The following season he made four appearances, including two starts. He joined Rotherham Titans ahead of the 2013-14 season, and played there for three seasons, making 64 appearances including 40 starts and scoring nine tries. In 2016 he returned to Irish club rugby, joining City of Armagh and being named the team's captain. He led them to their first title in senior rugby, winning the Ulster Senior League in 2016, and helped them win promotion to Division 2A of the All-Ireland League. He retired as a player on medical advice following a series of concussions in December 2017, and joined City of Armagh's coaching team as assistant forwards coach.
