= Paul Marshall (rugby union) =

Irish rugby union player

- Born: Paul Marshall; 26 July 1985 (age 41) Belfast, Northern Ireland
- Height: 1.69 m (5 ft 6 1/2 in)
- Weight: 76 kg (12 st 0 lb)
- School: Methodist College Belfast
- University: Ulster University

Rugby union career
- Position: Scrum-half
Amateur team(s)
Years	Team	Apps	(Points)
- Belfast Harlequins
Senior career
Years	Team	Apps	(Points)
2006–2018	Ulster	206	(122)
- Correct as of 28 April 2018
International career
Years	Team	Apps	(Points)
2006	Ireland U21		
2008	Ireland Wolfhounds	2	(0)
2013	Ireland	3	(0)
2014-15	Emerging Ireland	5	(10)
- Correct as of 15 June 2013
National sevens team
Years	Team		Comps
2009	Ireland 7s		

Paul Marshall (born 26 July 1985) is a former Irish rugby union player who was educated at Methodist College Belfast.

== Ulster ==
Paul Joined Ulster at the beginning of the 2006/2007 on a full contract having graduated from the Ulster Academy. His first senior game was against Newport Gwent Dragons on November 9, 2006, coming on as a substitute. He used to play scrum-half for Ulster and is a former captain of the Ulster U21 rugby team. In early January 2012 Paul signed a new 2-year contract extension with Ulster. He was named Most Improved Player for the 2011/12 season at the annual Awards Dinner. He was man-of-the-match against Castres in the Heineken Cup at the start of the 2012/13 campaign. Marshall signed a new three-year contract in October 2013 that will keep him at Ulster until the summer of 2017. Which came as a surprise after turning down a lucrative deal from an English-based club.

== Ireland ==
Marshall was part of the Irish Under 21 Six Nations team in the 05/06 season and was selected for the 2008 Ireland Wolfhounds Churchill Cup tour. He represented Ireland in the 2009 Rugby World Cup Sevens. His fine form in both the Heineken Cup and the RaboDirect PRO12 was rewarded when he won his first cap against Italy, albeit on the wing for 30 seconds, in the 2013 RBS 6 Nations. That Summer Marshall added to his tally of international caps when he played against the United States and Canada.

== Personal life ==
Marshall is a devout Christian. He is a physical education (P.E.) teacher at Antrim Grammar School (2019–present).
