= Nigel Brady =

Irish rugby union footballer

- Born: Nigel Brady; October 9, 1979 (age 47) Ireland
- Height: 1.78 m (5 ft 10 in)
- Weight: 98 kg (216 lb)

Rugby union career
- Position: Hooker
Senior career
Years	Team	Apps	(Points)
2002-13	Ulster	119	(15)
2013-14	Stade Aurillacois	12	(5)
International career
Years	Team	Apps	(Points)
2010-11	Wolfhounds	2	(0)

Nigel Brady (born 9 October 1979) is an Irish former rugby union player who played hooker for Dungannon, Ulster, Aurillac and Ireland 'A'

He attended Royal School Dungannon, and represented Ulster and Ireland at schoolboy level. He joined Dungannon RFC in 1998, and was part of the Dungannon team that won the All-Ireland League in 2001.

He signed a development contract with Ulster in January 2002, and made his debut later that year. He made 119 appearances for Ulster over 11 years, mainly as backup to Rory Best. He represented Ireland 'A'.

In 2013 he moved to France, joining Aurillac, coached by his former Ulster teammate Jeremy Davidson, but was forced to retire through injury after one season. He was appointed forwards coach of Dungannon in 2014, replacing Paddy Johns.
