= Declan Fitzpatrick =

Irish former rugby union footballer

- Born: Declan Fitzpatrick; 12 July 1983 (age 43) Bromsgrove, England
- Height: 1.8 m (5 ft 11 in)
- Weight: 118 kg (18 st 8 lb)
- University: University of Ulster

Rugby union career
- Position: Prop
Amateur team(s)
Years	Team	Apps	(Points)
- Moseley
–	Belfast Harlequins		
–	Dungannon		
Senior career
Years	Team	Apps	(Points)
2006–2015	Ulster	98	(15)
- Correct as of 1 June 2020
International career
Years	Team	Apps	(Points)
2006–2013	Ireland Wolfhounds	9	(0)
2012–2013	Ireland	7	(0)
- Correct as of 24 November 2013

Declan Fitzpatrick (born 12 July 1983) is an Irish former rugby union player. He played for Ulster from 2006 to 2015, and won seven caps for Ireland.

Born in Bromsgrove, Worcestershire, England to parents from counties Galway and Mayo, he was identified as a prospect by the Irish Exiles programme, and moved to Belfast where he played for Belfast Harlequins, and later for Dungannon. while studying quantity surveying at the University of Ulster. He was part of the Irish national academy, and represented Ireland at under-21 level.

He made his debut for Ulster in 2006, and made 98 appearances for the province. He was capped seven times for Ireland, including three test appearances on the 2012 tour of New Zealand. His final appearance for Ireland was in a 2013 defeat to New Zealand.

His final match for Ulster was a Champions Cup defeat away to Toulon in January 2015. He announced his retirement in April 2015 for medical reasons, having sustained six concussions in his career. He issued legal proceedings against the IRFU, Ulster and World Rugby in March 2023 in relation to head injuries.
