= 2010–11 Ulster Rugby season =

- Ground: Ravenhill Stadium (Capacity: 12,500)
- Coach(es): David Humphreys (Director of Rugby); Brian McLaughlin (Head Coach)
- Captain: Johann Muller
- Top scorer: Ian Humphreys (155)
- Most tries: Craig Gilroy (8)
- League(s): Heineken Cup (quarter-finalists); Celtic League (semi-finalists)
1st kit	2nd kit

The 2010–11 Ulster Rugby season was Ulster's 17th season since the advent of professionalism in rugby union, and their second under head coach Brian McLaughlin. This season marked the debuts of two South Africans, scrum-half Ruan Pienaar (replacing Isaac Boss, who had moved to Leinster) and second row forward Johann Muller. Ulster were quarter-finalists in the European Rugby Champions Cup, and semi-finalists in the Celtic League. Ruan Pienaar was Player of the Year. Nevin Spence was IRUPA Young Player of the Year.

Forwards coach Jeremy Davidson left at the end of the season.

== Staff ==
Position	Name	Nationality
Chief Executive Officer	Shane Logan	Ireland
Director of Rugby	David Humphreys	Ireland
Head Coach	Brian McLaughlin	Ireland
Forwards Coach	Jeremy Davidson	Ireland
Backs Coach	Neil Doak	Ireland

== Squad ==
=== Senior squad ===
==== Players in (Season 2010/2011) ====
- (South Africa) Johann Muller: from (South Africa) Sharks
- (Ireland) Tim Barker: from (Scotland) Glasgow Warriors
- (South Africa) Ruan Pienaar from (South Africa) Sharks
- (South Africa) Pedrie Wannenburg: from (South Africa) Bulls
- (Australia) Adam D'Arcy from (Australia) Manly RFC
- (United States) Paul Emerick from (Italy) Overmach Parma
- (Ireland) Jerry Cronin from (Ireland) Ballynahinch
- (Ireland) Alan Whitten from (Ireland) Instonians (short-term injury cover)

==== Promoted from academy ====
- (Ireland) Adam Macklin
- (Ireland) Paddy McAllister
- (Ireland) Neil McComb
- (Ireland) Ian Porter
- (Ireland) Nevin Spence
- (Ireland) Tommy Seymour
- (Ireland) Jamie Smith

==== Players out (Season 2010/2011) ====
- (Ireland) Isaac Boss to Leinster
- (Ireland) Ed O'Donoghue to Leinster
- (Fiji) Timoci Nagusa to Montpellier
- (Ireland) Justin Fitzpatrick retired
- (Australia) Tamaiti Horua released
- (Ireland) Matt McCullough retired
- (Ireland) Cillian Willis to Connacht Rugby
- (Ireland) David Pollock retired
- (Ireland) Bryn Cunningham retired
- (Australia) Clinton Schifcofske to (Wales) Celtic Crusaders (rugby league)

Ulster Rugby squad
**Props**: (Ireland) **Tom Court** (21 apps, 18 starts, 5 pts); (South Africa) **BJ Botha** (14 apps, 12 starts); (Ireland) Declan Fitzpatrick (15 apps, 11 starts, 5 pts); (Ireland) **Bryan Young** (19 apps, 10 starts); (Ireland) Paddy McAllister (19 apps, 8 starts); (Ireland) Jerry Cronin (11 apps, 1 start); (Ireland) Alan Whitten (1 app); (Ireland) Adam Macklin (no apps); **Hookers**: (Ireland) **Rory Best** (17 apps, 15 starts, 10 pts); (Ireland) Andi Kyriacou (17 apps, 12 starts); (Ireland) Nigel Brady (16 apps, 10 starts); **Locks**: (South Africa) **Johann Muller** (c) (26 apps, 26 starts); (Ireland) **Dan Tuohy** (20 apps, 15 starts); (Ireland) Tim Barker (9 apps, 3 starts); (Ireland) **Ryan Caldwell** (6 apps, 3 starts); (Ireland) Neil McComb (5 apps)	**Back row**: (South Africa) **Pedrie Wannenburg** (29 apps, 26 starts, 25 pts); (Ireland) **Chris Henry** (29 apps, 22 starts, 5 pts); (South Africa) Robbie Diack* (22 apps, 16 starts, 5 pts); (Ireland) Willie Faloon (23 apps, 14 starts, 5 pts); (Ireland) **Stephen Ferris** (9 apps, 8 starts, 10 pts); (Ireland) T. J. Anderson (4 apps, 2 starts, 5 pts); (Ireland) Ali Birch (no apps); **Scrum-halves**: (South Africa) **Ruan Pienaar** (23 apps, 23 starts, 138 pts); (Ireland) Paul Marshall (19 apps, 9 starts); (Ireland) Ian Porter (3 apps); **Fly-halves**: (Ireland) Ian Humphreys (20 apps, 19 starts, 159 pts); (England) Niall O'Connor (6 apps, 5 starts, 59 pts); (Ireland) Paddy Jackson (1 app, 1 start)	**Centres**: (Ireland) Nevin Spence (21 apps, 20 starts, 25 pts); (Ireland) **Paddy Wallace** (21 apps, 19 starts, 30 pts); (Ireland) **Darren Cave** (12 apps, 10 starts, 20 pts); (Ireland) **Ian Whitten** (19 apps, 10 starts, 10 pts); (Ireland) Luke Marshall (7 apps, 3 starts, 5 pts); (United States) Paul Emerick (2 apps, 2 starts); **Wings**: (Scotland) **Simon Danielli** (21 apps, 19 starts, 15 pts); (Ireland) **Andrew Trimble** (18 apps, 17 starts, 30 pts); (Ireland) **Craig Gilroy** (14 apps, 13 starts, 40 pts); (Ireland) Tommy Seymour (7 apps, 3 starts, 5 pts); (Ireland) Connor Gaston (3 apps, 2 starts); (Ireland) Mark McCrea (2 apps, 2 starts); (Ireland) David McIlwaine (3 apps, 1 start); **Fullbacks**: (Australia) Adam D'Arcy* (24 apps, 23 starts, 20 pts); (Ireland) Jamie Smith (5 apps, 5 starts)
(c) denotes the team captain, **Bold** denotes internationally capped players. Italics denotes academy players who appeared in the senior team.^{*} denotes players qualified to play for Ireland on residency or dual nationality. Players and their allocated positions from the Ulster Rugby website.

=== Academy squad ===
==== Players in ====
- (Ireland) Iain Henderson
- (Ireland) Paddy Jackson
- (Ireland) Kyle McCall
- (Ireland) Ali Birch
- (Ireland) Conor Carey
- (Ireland) Craig Gilroy
- (Ireland) David McGuigan
- (Ireland) Stephen Lecky
- (Ireland) Blane McIlroy
- (Ireland) David McIlwaine

==== Players out ====
- (Ireland) James Sandford to (England) Rotherham Titans
- (Ireland) Sean Dougall
- (Ireland) Pal Pritchard
- (Ireland) Jonny Shiels

Position	Name	Nationality
High Performance Manager	Gary Longwell	Ireland
Elite Player Development Officer	Jonny Bell	Ireland
Elite Player Development Officer	Niall Malone	Ireland
Strength & Conditioning Coach	Chris Shiells	Ireland
Strength & Conditioning Coach	Kevin Geary	Ireland

Academy squad
**Props**: (Ireland) Conor Carey (Ballymena) (1); (Ireland) Kyle McCall (Ballynahinch) (1); **Hookers**: (Ireland) Niall Annett (Belfast Harlequins) (2); (Ireland) John Burns (Ballymena) (2)	**Locks**: (Ireland) Iain Henderson (QUB) (1); **Back row**: (Ireland) David McGuigan (QUB) (1); (Ireland) Ali Birch (Dungannon) (1); (Ireland) Stephen Lecky (Glasgow Hawks) (1); **Scrum-halves**: (Ireland) Blane McIlroy (Ballymena) (1); (Ireland) Michael Heaney (2); **Fly-halves**: (Ireland) Paddy Jackson (Dungannon) (1); (Ireland) James McKinney (QUB) (2)	**Centres**: (Ireland) Luke Marshall (2); **Wings**: (Ireland) Chris Cochrane (4); (Ireland) Michael Allen (2); (Ireland) Conor Gaston (2); (Ireland) Craig Gilroy (1); **Fullbacks**: (Ireland) Ricky Andrew (3); (Ireland) David McIlwaine (QUB) (1)

== Season record ==
Competition	Played	Won	Drawn	Lost	PF	PA	PD	TF	TA
2010-11 Heineken Cup	7	5	0	2	158	116	42	16	10
2010-11 Celtic League	23	15	1	7	483	436	47	44	37
Total	30	20	1	9	641	552	89	60	47

== Heineken Cup ==
=== Pool 4 ===
Team	P	W	D	L	Tries for	Tries against	Try diff	Points for	Points against	Points diff	TB	LB	Pts
(France) Biarritz (4)	6	4	0	2	16	9	+7	140	85	+55	4	2	22
(Ireland) Ulster (8)	6	5	0	1	15	8	+7	145	93	+52	2	0	22
(England) Bath	6	2	0	4	20	8	+12	147	108	+39	2	4	14
(Italy) Aironi	6	1	0	5	4	30	−26	65	211	−146	0	0	4

- Biarritz won the tiebreaker over Ulster with a 6–4 advantage in head-to-head competition points.

8 October 2010	Ulster (Ireland)	30 – 6	(Italy) Aironi	Ravenhill, Belfast
19:30	Try: Trimble 21' m Humphreys 44' m Danielli 60' c Pienaar 67' c Con: Pienaar (0/2); Humphreys (2/2); Pen: Pienaar (2/3) 2', 39'	Report; Match centre	Pen: Mercier (2/3) 5', 17'; Cards: Bortolami (yellow card) 29'	Attendance: 7,777; Referee: Chris White (England)
Ulster lineup: 1. Bryan Young, 2. Rory Best, 3. Tom Court, 4. Johann Muller (c), 5. Tim Barker, 6. Pedrie Wannenburg, 7. Chris Henry, 8. Robbie Diack, 9. Ruan Pienaar, 10. Ian Humphreys, 11. Simon Danielli, 12. Paddy Wallace, 13. Darren Cave, 14. Andrew Trimble, 15. Jamie Smith.; Replacements: 16. Nigel Brady (for Wallace 74'), 17. Paddy McAllister (for Young 62'), 18. Alan Whitten (for Court 70'); 19. Dan Tuohy (for Barker 52'), 20. Willie Faloon (for Wannenburg 65'), 21. Paul Marshall (for Pienaar 72'), 22. Ian Whitten (for Cave 45'), 23. David McIlwaine (for Smith 64').				Attendance: 7,777; Referee: Chris White (England)

17 October 2010	Biarritz Olympique (France)	35 – 15	(Ireland) Ulster	Parc des Sports Aguiléra, Biarritz
16:00	Try: Ngwenya (2) 44' c, 76' m Carizza 60' c Marconnet 66' c Con: Yachvili (3/4); Pen: Yachvili (3/3) 36', 53', 57'	Report; Match centre	Try: Trimble 67' m Ferris 80' c Con: Pienaar (1/2); Pen: Pienaar (1/2) 12'	Attendance: 10,000; Referee: Dave Pearson (England)
Ulster lineup: 1. Tom Court, 2. Rory Best, 3. BJ Botha, 4. Johann Muller (c), 5. Tim Barker, 6. Pedrie Wannenburg, 7. Stephen Ferris, 8. Robbie Diack, 9. Ruan Pienaar, 10. Ian Humphreys, 11. Simon Danielli, 12. Paddy Wallace, 13. Ian Whitten, 14. Andrew Trimble, 15. David McIlwaine.; Replacements: 16. Andi Kyriacou (for Henry 72'), 17. Paddy McAllister (for Botha 68'), 18. Bryan Young, 19. Dan Tuohy (for Barker 52'), 20. Chris Henry (for Diack 61'), 21. Paul Marshall, 22. Nevin Spence (for Humphreys 72'), 23. Adam D'Arcy (for Danielli 25').				Attendance: 10,000; Referee: Dave Pearson (England)

11 December 2010	Ulster (Ireland)	22 - 18	(England) Bath	Ravenhill, Belfast
13:30	Try: Wannenburg 34' c Con: Humphreys (1/1); Pen: Humphreys (5/6) 12', 39', 53', 60', 64'	Report; Match centre	Try: Cuthbert 7' c Moody 23' m Con: Barkley (1/2); Pen: Barkley (2/2) 2', 43'; Cards: Flatman (yellow card)	Attendance: 8,247; Referee: Jérôme Garces (France)
Ulster lineup: 1. Tom Court, 2. Nigel Brady, 3. BJ Botha, 4. Johann Muller (c), 5. Dan Tuohy, 6. Stephen Ferris, 7. Chris Henry, 8. Pedrie Wannenburg, 9. Ruan Pienaar, 10. Ian Humphreys, 11. Simon Danielli, 12. Paddy Wallace, 13. Nevin Spence, 14. Andrew Trimble, 15. Adam D'Arcy.; Replacements: 16. Andi Kyriacou, 17. Paddy McAllister, 18. Bryan Young, 19. Tim Barker, 20. Willie Faloon (for Henry 56'), 21. Paul Marshall, 22. Ian Whitten, 23. David McIlwaine.				Attendance: 8,247; Referee: Jérôme Garces (France)

18 December 2010	Bath (England)	22 - 26	(Ireland) Ulster	Recreation Ground, Bath
13:30	Try: Carraro 1' m Banahan 69' m Pen: Barkley (4) 8', 14', 24', 67'; Cards: James (yellow card) 44'	Report; Match centre	Try: D'Arcy 11' c Spence 56' c Con: Humphreys (2/2); Pen: Humphreys (4) 16' 38', 59', 71'; Cards: Spence (yellow card) 67'	Attendance: 11,900; Referee: Pascal Gauzere (France)
Ulster lineup: 1. Tom Court, 2. Nigel Brady, 3. BJ Botha, 4. Johann Muller (c), 5. Dan Tuohy, 6. Pedrie Wannenburg, 7. Willie Faloon, 8. Robbie Diack, 9. Ruan Pienaar, 10. Ian Humphreys, 11. Simon Danielli, 12. Paddy Wallace, 13. Nevin Spence, 14. Andrew Trimble, 15. Adam D'Arcy.; Replacements: 16. Andi Kyriacou, 17. Paddy McAllister (for Court 70'), 18. Bryan Young, 19. Tim Barker (for Tuohy 57'), 20. Chris Henry (for Diack 57'), 21. Paul Marshall, 22. Ian Whitten, 23. Jamie Smith.				Attendance: 11,900; Referee: Pascal Gauzere (France)

15 January 2011	Ulster (Ireland)	9 – 6	(France) Biarritz Olympique	Ravenhill, Belfast
15:30	Pen: Humphreys (3/4) 48', 56', 77'	Report; Match centre	Pen: Yachvili (2/2) 18', 39'; Cards: Lund (yellow card)	Attendance: 10,566; Referee: Nigel Owens (Wales)
Ulster lineup: 1. Tom Court, 2. Rory Best, 3. BJ Botha, 4. Johann Muller (c), 5. Dan Tuohy, 6. Stephen Ferris, 7. Willie Faloon, 8. Pedrie Wannenburg, 9. Ruan Pienaar, 10. Ian Humphreys, 11. Simon Danielli, 12. Paddy Wallace, 13. Nevin Spence, 14. Andrew Trimble, 15. Adam D'Arcy.; Replacements: 16. Nigel Brady (for Best 74'), 17. Bryan Young, 18/ Declan Fitzpatrick (for Botha 69'); 19. Tim Barker, 20. Chris Henry (for Faloon 72'), 21. Paul Marshall, 22. Ian Whitten, 23. David McIlwaine.				Attendance: 10,566; Referee: Nigel Owens (Wales)

22 January 2011	Aironi (Italy)	6 – 43	(Ireland) Ulster	Stadio Luigi Zaffanella, Viadana
14:30	Pen: Tebaldi 37'; Drop: Marshall 26'	Report; Match centre	Try: Trimble 23' c Wannenburg (2) 41' c, 46' c Penalty try 57' c Henry 67' c Danielli 78' m Con: Humphreys (5/6); Pen: Humphreys (1/2) 3'	Attendance: 3,000; Referee: Christophe Berdos (France)
Ulster lineup: 1. Tom Court, 2. Nigel Brady, 3. Declan Fitzpatrick, 4. Johann Muller (c), 5. Dan Tuohy, 6. Stephen Ferris, 7. Willie Faloon, 8. Pedrie Wannenburg, 9. Ruan Pienaar, 10. Ian Humphreys, 11. Simon Danielli, 12. Paddy Wallace, 13. Nevin Spence, 14. Andrew Trimble, 15. Adam D'Arcy.; Replacements: 16. Andi Kyriacou (for Brady 67'), 17. Bryan Young (for Court 57'), 18. Jerry Cronin (for Fitzpatrick 67'); 19. Tim Barker (for Tuohy 67'), 20. Chris Henry (for Ferris 57'), 21. Paul Marshall (for Pienaar 66'), 22. Ian Whitten (for Wallace 67'), 23. David McIlwaine (for Trimble 64').				Attendance: 3,000; Referee: Christophe Berdos (France)

=== Quarter-final ===
10 April 2011	Northampton Saints (England)	23 – 13	(Ireland) Ulster	Stadium:mk, Milton Keynes
14:00	Try: Tongaʻuiha 2' c Dickson 55' c Con: Myler (2/2) 3', 56'; Pen: Myler (3/5) 40', 48', 65'	Report; Match centre	Try: Trimble 32' c Con: Humphreys (1/1) 33'; Pen: Humphreys (2/2) 7', 14'	Attendance: 21,309; Referee: Romain Poite (France)
Ulster lineup: 1. Tom Court, 2. Rory Best, 3. BJ Botha, 4. Johann Muller (c), 5. Dan Tuohy, 6. Robbie Diack, 7. Chris Henry, 8. Pedrie Wannenburg, 9. Ruan Pienaar, 10. Ian Humphreys, 11. Simon Danielli, 12. Paddy Wallace, 13. Nevin Spence, 14. Andrew Trimble, 15. Adam D'Arcy.; Replacements: 16. Andi Kyriacou, 17. Bryan Young, 18. Paddy McAllister (for Botha 70'); 19. Tim Barker (for Tuohy 56'), 20. Willie Faloon (for Diack 62'), 21. Paul Marshall, 22. Ian Whitten (for Muller 78'), 23. Craig Gilroy.				Attendance: 21,309; Referee: Romain Poite (France)

== Celtic League ==
	Team	Pld	W	D	L	PF	PA	PD	TF	TA	Try bonus	Losing bonus	Pts
1	(Ireland) Munster	22	19	0	3	496	327	+169	44	22	5	2	83
2	(Ireland) Leinster	22	15	1	6	495	336	+159	50	25	5	3	70
3	(Ireland) Ulster	22	15	1	6	480	418	+62	44	35	3	2	67
4	(Wales) Ospreys	22	12	1	9	553	418	+135	56	29	6	7	63
5	(Wales) Scarlets	22	12	1	9	503	453	+50	49	43	5	7	62
6	(Wales) Cardiff Blues	22	13	1	8	479	392	+87	37	33	3	3	60
7	(Wales) Newport Gwent Dragons	22	10	1	11	444	462	−18	47	49	3	4	49
8	(Scotland) Edinburgh	22	9	0	13	421	460	−39	39	44	2	5	43
9	(Ireland) Connacht	22	7	1	14	394	459	−65	32	44	3	6	39
10	(Italy) Benetton Treviso	22	9	0	13	374	502	−128	29	58	0	2	38
11	(Scotland) Glasgow Warriors	22	6	1	15	401	543	−142	33	48	1	6	33
12	(Italy) Aironi	22	1	0	21	247	517	−270	21	52	0	8	12
Under the standard bonus point system, points are awarded as follows: 4 points for a win; 2 points for a draw; 1 bonus point for scoring 4 tries (or more) (Try bonus); 1 bonus point for losing by 7 points (or fewer) (Losing bonus)
Green background (rows 1 to 4) are play-off places. Correct as of 7 May 2011. Source: RaboDirect PRO12

3 September 2010	Ulster (Ireland)	27 – 26	(Wales) Ospreys (1 BP)	Ravenhill, Belfast
19:05	Try: Ferris; Cave; Con: O'Connor; Pen: O'Connor (4)	Report; Match centre	Try: Fussell; Biggar; Con: Biggar (2); Pen: Biggar (3); Cards: Walker (yellow card)	Attendance: 7,500; Referee: Peter Allan
Ulster lineup: 1. Bryan Young, 2. Rory Best, 3. Declan Fitzpatrick, 4. Johann Muller (c), 5. Tim Barker, 6. Stephen Ferris, 7. Willie Faloon, 8. Pedrie Wannenburg, 9. Paul Marshall, 10. Niall O'Connor, 11. David McIlwaine, 12. Ian Whitten, 13. Darren Cave, 14. Tommy Seymour, 15. Adam D'Arcy.; Replacements: 16. Nigel Brady (for Best 48'), 17. Tom Court (for Young 40'), 18. Paddy McAllister (for Fitzpatrick 65'); 19. Ryan Caldwell, 20. Robbie Diack (for Feris 65'), 21. Ian Porter, 22. Paddy Wallace (for Whitten 21'), 23. Jonny Shiels.				Attendance: 7,500; Referee: Peter Allan

11 September 2010	(1 BP) Aironi (Italy)	15 – 22	(Ireland) Ulster	Stadio Luigi Zaffanella, Viadana
19:05	Pen: Mercier (4); Drop: Mercier; Cards: Williams (yellow card)	Report; Match centre	Try: Diack; Con: O'Connor; Pen: O'Connor (5); Cards: Wannenburg (yellow card)	Attendance: 4,453; Referee: Stefano Penne
Ulster lineup: 1. Tom Court, 2. Nigel Brady, 3. Declan Fitzpatrick, 4. Johann Muller (c), 5. Tim Barker, 6. Pedrie Wannenburg, 7. Chris Henry, 8. Robbie Diack, 9. Paul Marshall, 10. Niall O'Connor, 11. David McIlwaine, 12. Paddy Wallace, 13. Darren Cave, 14. Tommy Seymour, 15. Adam D'Arcy.; Replacements: 16. Andi Kyriacou (for Brady 69'), 17. Paddy McAllister (for Court 73'), 18. Bryan Young (for Fitzpatrick 4'); 19. Ryan Caldwell (for Barker 62'), 20. Willie Faloon (for Henry 60'), 21. Ian Porter (for P. Marshall 60'), 22. Ian Whitten), 23. Jamie Smith.				Attendance: 4,453; Referee: Stefano Penne

17 September 2010	Ulster (Ireland)	29 – 21	(Scotland) Edinburgh	Ravenhill, Belfast
20:05	Try: Trimble; Whitten; Cave; Con: O'Connor; Pen: O'Connor (3); Drop: O'Connor	Report; Match centre	Try: Visser; Cairns; Con: Godman; Pen: Paterson (2); Godman; Cards: Newlands (yellow card)	Attendance: 7,461; Referee: Alan Falzone
Ulster lineup: 1. Bryan Young, 2. Andi Kyriacou, 3. Tom Court, 4. Johann Muller (c), 5. Ryan Caldwell, 6. Stephen Ferris, 7. Chris Henry, 8. Robbie Diack, 9. Paul Marshall, 10. Niall O'Connor, 11. Andrew Trimble, 12. Ian Whitten, 13. Darren Cave, 14. Paul Emerick, 15. Jamie Smith.; Replacements: 16. Rory Best (for Kyriacou 52'), 17. Paddy McAllister, 18. BJ Botha (for Young 52'), 19. Tim Barker, 20. Pedrie Wannenburg (for Diack 52'), 21. Ian Porter (for P. Marshall 66'), Ian Humphreys, 23. David McIlwaine.				Attendance: 7,461; Referee: Alan Falzone

25 September 2010	Connacht (Ireland)	15 – 15	(Ireland) Ulster	The Sportsground, Galway
19:30	Pen: Keatley (5); Cards: Ofisa (yellow card)	Report; Match centre	Pen: Wallace (4); O'Connor; Cards: Emerick (yellow card); Trimble (yellow card)	Attendance: 3,761; Referee: Alain Rolland
Ulster lineup: 1. Bryan Young, 2. Rory Best (c), 3. Tom Court, 4. Tim Barker, 5. Ryan Caldwell, 6. Stephen Ferris, 7. Chris Henry, 8. Pedrie Wannenburg, 9. Paul Marshall, 10. Paddy Wallace, 11. Andrew Trimble, 12. Ian Whitten, 13. Darren Cave, 14. Paul Emerick, 15. Jamie Smith.; Replacements: 16. Andi Kyriacou, 17. Paddy McAllister (for Botha 77'), 18. BJ Botha (for Young 40'), 19. Dan Tuohy (for Barker 56'), 20. Willie Faloon (for Ferris 11'), 21. Ian Porter, Niall O'Connor (for Whitten 66'), 23. David McIlwaine (for Emerick 67').				Attendance: 3,761; Referee: Alain Rolland

1 October 2010	Ulster (Ireland)	19 – 17	(Scotland) Glasgow Warriors (1 BP)	Ravenhill, Belfast
19:05	Try: Pienaar; Con: Pienaar; Pen: Pienaar (4)	Report; Match centre	Try: Van der Merwe; Pen: Weir (4)	Attendance: 7,822
Ulster lineup: 1. Bryan Young, 2. Rory Best, 3. Tom Court, 4. Johann Muller (c), 5. Dan Tuohy, 6. Pedrie Wannenburg, 7. Chris Henry, 8. Robbie Diack, 9. Ruan Pienaar, 10. Niall O'Connor, 11. Simon Danielli, 12. Paddy Wallace, 13. Darren Cave, 14. Andrew Trimble, 15. Jamie Smith.; Replacements: 16. Nigel Brady', 17. Paddy McAllister (for Young 74'), 18. Alan Whitten, 19. Tim Barker (for Tuohy 49'), 20. Willie Faloon, 21. Paul Marshall, 22. Ian Whitten (for O'Connor 66'), 23. David McIlwaine.				Attendance: 7,822

22 October 2010	Edinburgh (Scotland)	21 – 16	(Ireland) Ulster (1 BP)	Murrayfield, Edinburgh
19:05	Try: McKenzie; Talei; Con: Paterson; Pen: Paterson (2); Drop: Blair; Cards: Traynor (yellow card)	Report; Match centre	Try: Whitten; Con: Wallace; Pen: Wallace (2); Humphreys	Attendance: 3,195; Referee: James Jones
Ulster lineup: 1. Paddy McAllister, 2. Rory Best, 3. BJ Botha, 4. Johann Muller (c), 5. Dan Tuohy, 6. Stephen Ferris, 7. Chris Henry, 8. Robbie Diack, 9. Ruan Pienaar, 10. Paddy Wallace, 11. David McIlwaine, 12. Ian Whitten, 13. Andrew Trimble, 14. Mark McCrea, 15. Adam D'Arcy.; Replacements: 16. Andi Kyriacou (for Best 49'), 17. Tom Court (for McAllister 57'), 18. Bryan Young (for Botha 67'), 19. Ryan Caldwell, 20. Pedrie Wannenburg (for Henry 67'), 21. Paul Marshall, 22. Ian Humphreys (for McCrea 71'), 23. Nevin Spence.				Attendance: 3,195; Referee: James Jones

29 October 2010	Ulster (Ireland)	6 – 16	(Ireland) Munster	Ravenhill, Belfast
19:05	Pen: Pienaar (2)	Report; Match centre	Try: Dineen; Con: Warwick; Pen: Warwick (3)	Attendance: 10,750; Referee: Alan Lewis
Ulster lineup: 1. Paddy McAllister, 2. Nigel Brady, 3. Bryan Young, 4. Johann Muller (c), 5. Tim Barker, 6. Pedrie Wannenburg, 7. Willie Faloon, 8. Robbie Diack, 9. Ruan Pienaar, 10. Ian Humphreys, 11. David McIlwaine, 12. Nevin Spence, 13. Ian Whitten, 14. Mark McCrea, 15. Adam D'Arcy.; Replacements: 16. Andi Kyriacou, 17. Jerry Cronin (for McAllister 52'), 18. Alan Whitten, 19. Dan Tuohy (for Barker 56'), 20. Chris Henry, 21. Paul Marshall, 22. Niall O'Connor, 23. Luke Marshall (for McCrea).				Attendance: 10,750; Referee: Alan Lewis

21 November 2010	Cardiff Blues (Wales)	15 – 37	(Ireland) Ulster	Cardiff City Stadium
15:45	Try: Laulala; James; Con: Sweeney; Pen: Sweeney	Report; Match centre	Try: Gilroy (2); D'Arcy; Faloon; Wallace; Con: Humphreys (3); Pen: Humphreys (2); Cards: D'Arcy (yellow card)	Attendance: 6,202
Ulster lineup: 1. Paddy McAllister, 2. Nigel Brady, 3. BJ Botha, 4. Johann Muller (c), 5. Dan Tuohy, 6. Pedrie Wannenburg, 7. Chris Henry, 8. Robbie Diack, 9. Paul Marshall, 10. Ian Humphreys, 11. Simon Danielli, 12. Ian Whitten, 13. Nevin Spence, 14. Craig Gilroy, 15. Adam D'Arcy.; Replacements: 16. Andi Kyriacou (for Brady 69'), 17. Bryan Young (for McAllister 57'), 18. Jerry Cronin (for Botha 72'), 19. Tim Barker (for Muller 37'), 20. Willie Faloon (for Diack 48'), 21. Ian Porter (for P. Marshall 77'), 22. Paddy Wallace (for I. Whitten 47'), 23. Andrew Trimble (for Spence 47').				Attendance: 6,202

26 November 2010	Benetton Treviso (Italy)	9 – 19	(Ireland) Ulster	Stadio Comunale di Monigo, Treviso
19:05	Pen: Botes (2)	Report; Match centre	Try: Gilroy (2); Danielli; Con: Humphreys (2); Cards: Faloon (yellow card)	Attendance: 3,000
Ulster lineup: 1. Bryan Young, 2. Nigel Brady, 3. BJ Botha, 4. Tim Barker, 5. Dan Tuohy, 6. Pedrie Wannenburg, 7. Willie Faloon, 8. Chris Henry, 9. Paul Marshall, 10. Ian Humphreys, 11. Simon Danielli, 12. Paddy Wallace, 13. Darren Cave, 14. Craig Gilroy, 15. Adam D'Arcy.; Replacements: 16. Andi Kyriacou (for Brady 73'), 17. Paddy McAllister (for Young 57'), 18. Jerry Cronin, 19. Neil McComb (for Henry 58'), 20. Ali Birch, 21. Ian Porter, 22. Ian Whitten (for Cave 53'), 23. Nevin Spence.				Attendance: 3,000

3 December 2010	Ulster (Ireland)	P – P	(Wales) Newport Gwent Dragons	Ravenhill, Belfast
19:05

27 December 2010	Ulster (Ireland)	13 – 30	(Ireland) Leinster	Ravenhill, Belfast
16:00	Try: Gilroy; Con: O'Connor; Pen: O'Connor (2)	Report; Match centre	Try: O'Brien (2); Horgan; Con: Nacewa (3); Pen: Nacewa (3)	Attendance: 11,426
Ulster lineup: 1. Paddy McAllister, 2. Nigel Brady, 3. BJ Botha, 4. Johann Muller (c), 5. Dan Tuohy, 6. Pedrie Wannenburg, 7. Chris Henry, 8. Robbie Diack, 9. Ruan Pienaar, 10. Niall O'Connor, 11. Simon Danielli, 12. Ian Whitten, 13. Nevin Spence, 14. Craig Gilroy, 15. Adam D'Arcy.; Replacements: 16. Andi Kyriacou (for Brady 52'), 17. Bryan Young (for McAllister 52'), 18. Declan Fitzpatrick (for Botha 70'), 19. Tim Barker (for Diack 58'), 20. Willie Faloon (for Henry 65'), 21. Paul Marshall (for Whitten 65'), 22. Luke Marshall (for O'Connor 70'), 23. Tommy Seymour (for Pienaar 76').				Attendance: 11,426

1 January 2011	Munster (Ireland)	35 – 10	(Ireland) Ulster	Thomond Park, Limerick
19:30	Try: Hurley; O'Donnell; Murphy; Mafi; Con: Warwick (3); Pen: Warwick (3); Cards: Howlett (yellow card)	Report; Match centre	Try: Anderson; Con: Wallace; Pen: Wallace; Cards: McComb (yellow card)	Attendance: 22,000
Ulster lineup: 1. Bryan Young, 2. Rory Best (c), 3. Declan Fitzpatrick, 4. Tim Barker, 5. Ryan Caldwell, 6. TJ Anderson, 7. Willie Faloon, 8. Robbie Diack, 9. Paul Marshall, 10. Paddy Wallace, 11. Simon Danielli, 12. Luke Marshall, 13. Ian Whitten, 14. Tommy Seymour, 15. Jamie Smith.; Replacements: 16. Andi Kyriacou (for Best 79'), 17. BJ Botha, 18. Tom Court (for Fitzpatrick 40'), 19. Neil McComb (for Barker 40'), 20. Chris Henry (for Diack 51'), 21. Ian Porter', 22. Paddy Jackson, 23. David McIlwaine (for Smith 71').				Attendance: 22,000

7 January 2011	(1 BP) Ulster (Ireland)	32 – 13	(Italy) Benetton Treviso	Ravenhill, Belfast
19:05	Try: Pienaar; Spence; D'Arcy; Best; Con: Humphreys (3); Pen: Humphreys (2)	Report; Match centre	Try: Padro; Con: De Waal; Pen: De Waal (2)	Attendance: 6,651; Referee: Leighton Hodges
Ulster lineup: 1. Tom Court, 2. Rory Best, 3. BJ Botha, 4. Johann Muller (c), 5. Tim Barker, 6. Chris Henry, 7. Willie Faloon, 8. Pedrie Wannenburg, 9. Ruan Pienaar, 10. Ian Humphreys, 11. Simon Danielli, 12. Paddy Wallace, 13. Nevin Spence, 14. Andrew Trimble, 15. Adam D'Arcy.; Replacements: 16. Nigel Brady (for Best 71'), 17. Bryan Young (for Court 71'), 18. Declan Fitzpatrick (for Botha 63'), 19. Dan Tuohy (for Barker 46'), 20. Stephen Ferris (for Faloon 46'), 21. Paul Marshall (for Pienaar 40'), 22. Ian Whitten (for Spence 71'), 23. David McIlwaine (for Trimble 59').				Attendance: 6,651; Referee: Leighton Hodges

13 February 2011	Ospreys (Wales)	23 – 22	(Ireland) Ulster	Liberty Stadium, Swansea
17:10	Try: Holah; Pen: Biggar (6)	Report; Match centre	Try: Penalty try Con: Humphreys; Pen: Humphreys (2); Pienaar (3); Cards: Barker (yellow card)	Attendance: 5,802; Referee: Neil Patterson
Ulster lineup: 1. Bryan Young, 2. Nigel Brady, 3. Declan Fitzpatrick, 4. Johann Muller (c), 5. Tim Barker, 6. Chris Henry, 7. Willie Faloon, 8. Pedrie Wannenburg, 9. Ruan Pienaar, 10. Ian Humphreys, 11. Simon Danielli, 12. Ian Whitten, 13. Nevin Spence, 14. Craig Gilroy, 15. Adam D'Arcy.; Replacements: 16. Andi Kyriacou (for Brady 65'), 17. Jerry Cronin (for Young 59'), 18. Alan Whitten, 19. Ryan Caldwell (for Barker 65'), 20. TJ Anderson, 21. Paul Marshall (for Humphreys 32'), 22. Luke Marshall (for I. Whitten 67'), 23. David McIlwaine.				Attendance: 5,802; Referee: Neil Patterson

18 February 2011	(1 BP) Scarlets (Wales)	16 – 18	(Ireland) Ulster	Parc y Scarlets, Llanelli
19:05	Try: Penalty try Con: Priestland; Pen: Priestland (2); Drop: Priestland	Report; Match centre	Pen: Pienaar (6)	Attendance: 5,463; Referee: Andy Macpherson
Ulster lineup: 1. Tom Court, 2. Andi Kyriacou, 3. Declan Fitzpatrick, 4. Johann Muller (c), 5. Tim Barker, 6. TJ Anderson, 7. Chris Henry, 8. Pedrie Wannenburg, 9. Ruan Pienaar, 10. Paddy Jackson, 11. Craig Gilroy, 12. Paddy Wallace, 13. Nevin Spence, 14. Andrew Trimble, 15. Adam D'Arcy.; Replacements: 16. Nigel Brady (for Kyriacou 56'), 17. Bryan Young, 18. Jerry Cronin (for Fitzpatrick 65'), 19. Ryan Caldwell (for Barker 65'), 20. Robbie Diack (for Anderson 50'), 21. Paul Marshall (for Jackson 50'), 22. Luke Marshall, 23. Simon Danielli (for D'Arcy 50').				Attendance: 5,463; Referee: Andy Macpherson

25 February 2011	Ulster (Ireland)	32 – 13	(Wales) Cardiff Blues	Ravenhill, Belfast
19:05	Try: Gilroy; Pienaar; Trimble; Marshall; Con: Humphreys (3); Pen: Humphreys (2); Cards: McAllister (yellow card)	Report; Match centre	Try: Fish; Con: Sweeney; Pen: Sweeney (2)	Attendance: 8,383; Referee: James Jones
Ulster lineup: 1. Bryan Young, 2. Andi Kyriacou, 3. Declan Fitzpatrick, 4. Johann Muller (c), 5. Tim Barker, 6. Chris Henry, 7. Willie Faloon, 8. Pedrie Wannenburg, 9. Ruan Pienaar, 10. Ian Humphreys, 11. Craig Gilroy, 12. Luke Marshall, 13. Nevin Spence, 14. Andrew Trimble, 15. Adam D'Arcy.; Replacements: 16. Nigel Brady (for Kyriacou 50'), 17. Paddy McAllister (for Young 40'), 18. Jerry Cronin (for Faloon 64'), 19. Neil McComb (for Barker 65'), 20. TJ Anderson (for Wannenburg 74'), 21. Paul Marshall (for Humphreys 74'), 22. Ian Whitten, 23. Tommy Seymour (for Gilroy 39').				Attendance: 8,383; Referee: James Jones

4 March 2011	Ulster (Ireland)	23 – 10	(Italy) Aironi	Ravenhill, Belfast
19:05	Try: Court; Gilroy; Fitzpatrick; Con: Pienaar; Pen: Pienaar (2); Cards: Muller (yellow card)	Report; Match centre	Try: James Marshall; Con: Bocchino; Pen: Bocchino	Attendance: 7,700
Ulster lineup: 1. Paddy McAllister, 2. Nigel Brady, 3. Tom Court, 4. Johann Muller (c), 5. Tim Barker, 6. Chris Henry, 7. Willie Faloon, 8. Pedrie Wannenburg, 9. Paul Marshall, 10. Ruan Pienaar, 11. Craig Gilroy, 12. Luke Marshall, 13. Nevin Spence, 14. Andrew Trimble, 15. Adam D'Arcy.; Replacements: 16. Andi Kyriacou (for Brady 47'), 17. Declan Fitzpatrick (for McAllister 47'), 18. Jerry Cronin (for Fitzpatrick 72'), 19. Neil McComb (for Barker 64'), 20. Robbie Diack (for Faloon 72'), 21. Luke Marshall (for P. Marshall 58'), 22. Simon Danielli (for D'Arcy 47'), 23. Tommy Seymour.				Attendance: 7,700

18 March 2010	Ulster (Ireland)	25 – 23	(Wales) Newport Gwent Dragons (1 BP)	Ravenhill, Belfast
19:05	Try: Spence; Seymour; Cave; Con: Pienaar (2); Pen: Pienaar; Drop: Pienaar	Report; Match centre	Try: Tovey; Evans; Brew; Con: Hughes; Pen: Jones; Drop: Tovey	Attendance: 7,661; Referee: James Jones
Ulster lineup: 1. Paddy McAllister, 2. Andi Kyriacou, 3. Declan Fitzpatrick, 4. Johann Muller (c), 5. Tim Barker, 6. Chris Henry, 7. Willie Faloon, 8. Robbie Diack, 9. Ruan Pienaar, 10. Paddy Jackson, 11. Craig Gilroy, 12. Luke Marshall, 13. Nevin Spence, 14. Conor Gaston, 15. Adam D'Arcy.; Replacements: 16. Nigel Brady, 17. Bryan Young, 18. Jerry Cronin (for Fitzpatrick 60'), 19. Dan Tuohy (for Barker 46'), 20. Pedrie Wannenburg (for Diack 60'), 21. Paul Marshall (for Jackson 63'), 22. Darren Cave (for L. Marshall 63'), 23. Tommy Seymour (for D'Arcy 63').				Attendance: 7,661; Referee: James Jones

25 March 2011	(1 BP) Glasgow Warriors (Scotland)	19 – 22	(Ireland) Ulster	Firhill Stadium, Glasgow
20:05	Try: Grant; Con: Jackson; Pen: Jackson (3); Weir; Cards: Vernon (yellow card)	Report; Match centre	Try: Pienaar; Con: Pienaar; Pen: Pienaar (5); Cards: Best (yellow card)	Attendance: 2,715; Referee: David Jones
Ulster lineup: 1. Tom Court, 2. Andi Kyriacou, 3. Declan Fitzpatrick, 4. Johann Muller (c), 5. Dan Tuohy, 6. Robbie Diack, 7. Chris Henry, 8. Pedrie Wannenburg, 9. Paul Marshall, 10. Ruan Pienaar, 11. Craig Gilroy, 12. Paddy Wallace, 13. Nevin Spence, 14. Conor Gaston, 15. Simon Danielli.; Replacements: 16. Rory Best (for Kyriacou 50'), 17. Paddy McAllister (for Fitzpatrick 47'), 18. Bryan Young, 19. Tim Barker (for Tuohy 66'), 20. Willie Faloon (for Henry 61'), 21. Ian Whitten (for P. Marshall 65'), 22. Tommy Seymour (for Gaston 70'), 23. Adam D'Arcy.				Attendance: 2,715; Referee: David Jones

1 April 2011	Ulster (Ireland)	20 – 18	(Wales) Scarlets (1 BP)	Ravenhill, Belfast
19:05	Try: Humphreys (2); Con: Pienaar (2); Pen: Pienaar (2)	Report; Match centre	Try: Davies; Shingler; Con: Priestland; Pen: Jones (2); Cards: Turnbull (yellow card)	Attendance: 8,646; Referee: Graham Knox
Ulster lineup: 1. Tom Court, 2. Rory Best, 3. BJ Botha, 4. Johann Muller (c), 5. Dan Tuohy, 6. Robbie Diack, 7. Willie Faloon, 8. Pedrie Wannenburg, 9. Ruan Pienaar, 10. Ian Humphreys, 11. Simon Danielli, 12. Paddy Wallace, 13. Nevin Spence, 14. Andrew Trimble, 15. Adam D'Arcy.; Replacements: 16. Andi Kyriacou, 17. Paddy McAllister (for Botha 60'), 18. Declan Fitzpatrick, 19. Tim Barker (for Diack 71'), 20. Chris Henry (for Faloon 63'), 21. Paul Marshall, 22. Ian Whitten, 23. Craig Gilroy.				Attendance: 8,646; Referee: Graham Knox

16 April 2011	Leinster (Ireland)	34 – 26	(Ireland) Ulster	RDS Arena, Dublin
20:00	Try: Strauss; Fitzgerald; Horgan (2); Van der Merwe; Con: Sexton (3); Pen: Sexton; Cards: O'Brien (yellow card)	Report; Match centre	Try: Wannenburg; Gilroy; Con: Pienaar (2); Pen: Humphreys (3); Pienaar; Cards: Wannenburg (yellow card)	Attendance: 17,670
Ulster lineup: 1. Paddy McAllister, 2. Rory Best, 3. BJ Botha, 4. Tim Barker, 5. Dan Tuohy, 6. Robbie Diack, 7. Chris Henry, 8. Pedrie Wannenburg, 9. Ruan Pienaar, 10. Ian Humphreys, 11. Craig Gilroy, 12. Paddy Wallace, 13. Nevin Spence, 14. Andrew Trimble, 15. Adam D'Arcy.; Replacements: 16. Andi Kyriacou (for Best 76'), 17. Jerry Cronin (for Botha 33'), 18. Bryan Young (for McAllister 61'), 19. Neil McComb (for Barker 61'), 20. Willie Faloon (for Diack 50'), 21. Paul Marshall (for Humphreys 72'), 22. Darren Cave (for Spence 50'), 23. Conor Gaston (for D'Arcy 66').				Attendance: 17,670

22 April 2011	Ulster (Ireland)	27 – 16	(Ireland) Connacht	Ravenhill, Belfast
19:05	Try: Best; D'Arcy; Cave; Con: Humphreys (3); Pen: Humphreys (2)	Report; Match centre	Try: Cronin; Con: Keatley; Pen: Keatley (2); Drop: Keatley	Attendance: 9,239
Ulster lineup: 1. Paddy McAllister, 2. Rory Best, 3. Jerry Cronin, 4. Johann Muller (c), 5. Dan Tuohy, 6. Chris Henry, 7. Willie Faloon, 8. Pedrie Wannenburg, 9. Ruan Pienaar, 10. Ian Humphreys, 11. Simon Danielli, 12. Nevin Spence, 13. Darren Cave, 14. Craig Gilroy, 15. Adam D'Arcy.; Replacements: 16. Andi Kyriacou, 17. Bryan Young (for Cronin 55'), 18. Adam Macklin, 19. Tim Barker, 20. Robbie Diack (for Faloon 68'), 21. Paul Marshall, 22. Ian Whitten, 23. Conor Gaston.				Attendance: 9,239

6 May 2011	Newport Gwent Dragons (Wales)	13 – 20	(Ireland) Ulster	Rodney Parade, Newport
19:05	Try: Riley; Con: Jones; Pen: Jones; Tovey	Report; Match centre	Try: Spence (2); Wannenburg; Con: Humphreys; Pen: Humphreys	Attendance: 5,062
Ulster lineup: 1. Tom Court, 2. Rory Best, 3. Declan Fitzpatrick, 4. Johann Muller (c), 5. Dan Tuohy, 6. Pedrie Wannenburg, 7. Robbie Diack, 8. Chris Henry, 9. Ruan Pienaar, 10. Ian Humphreys, 11. Simon Danielli, 12. Nevin Spence, 13. Darren Cave, 14. Craig Gilroy, 15. Adam D'Arcy.; Replacements: 16. Andi Kyriacou, 17. Paddy McAllister (for Fitzpatrick 61'), 18. Jerry Cronin, 19. Tim Barker (for Diack 66'), 20. TJ Anderson (for Tuohy 70'), 21. Paul Marshall, 22. Ian Whitten, 23. Conor Gaston.				Attendance: 5,062

=== Semi-final ===
13 May 2011	Leinster (Ireland)	18 – 3	(Ireland) Ulster	RDS Arena, Dublin
19:05	Try: McFadden 25' m Fitzgerald 72' c Con: McFadden (1/1); Pen: Sexton (2/3) 5', 40'	Report; Match centre	Pen: Pienaar (1/1) 62'	Attendance: 14,476; Referee: George Clancy
Ulster lineup: 1. Tom Court, 2. Rory Best, 3. Declan Fitzpatrick, 4. Johann Muller (c), 5. Tim Barker, 6. Pedrie Wannenburg, 7. Robbie Diack, 8. Chris Henry, 9. Ruan Pienaar, 10. Ian Humphreys, 11. Simon Danielli, 12. Nevin Spence, 13. Darren Cave, 14. Craig Gilroy, 15. Adam D'Arcy.; Replacements: 16. Andi Kyriacou (for Best 76'), 17. Paddy McAllister (for Court 74'), 18. Jerry Cronin (for Fitzpatrick 40'), 19. Neil McComb (for Barker 74'), 20. TJ Anderson (for Wannenburg 76'), 21. Paul Marshall (for Humphreys 59'), 22. Ian Whitten (for Cave 76'), 23. Conor Gaston (for Danielli 74').				Attendance: 14,476; Referee: George Clancy

== Home attendance ==
Domestic League					European Cup					Total	
League	Fixtures	Average Attendance	Highest	Lowest	League	Fixtures	Average Attendance	Highest	Lowest	Total Attendance	Average Attendance
2010–11 Celtic League	11	8,476	11,426	6,651	2010–11 Heineken Cup	3	8,863	10,566	7,777	119,829	8,559

== Friendlies ==
13 August 2010	Ulster (Ireland)	14-26	(England) Bath	Ravenhill, Belfast
	Try: McCrea; Wanneburg; Con: Humphreys (2)	Report	Try: Batty; Banahan; Barkley; Cuthbert; Con: Vesty (2); Barkley
Ulster lineup: 1. Paddy McAllister, 2. Nigel Brady, 3. Declan Fitzpatrick, 4. Tim Barker, 5. Johann Muller, 6. Pedrie Wannenburg, 7. Willie Faloon, 8. Robbie Diack, 9. Paul Marshall, 10. Ian Humphreys, 11. Tommy Seymour, 12. Ian Whitten, 13. Darren Cave, 14. Mark McCrea, 15. Jamie Smith.; Replacements: 16. Andi Kyriacou (for Brady 61'), 17. Tom Court (for McAllister 61'), 18. Adam Macklin (for Fitzpatrick 61'), 19. Neil McComb (for Muller 40'), 20. T. J. Anderson (for Faloon 65'), 21. Ian Porter (for Marshall 21'), 22. Niall O'Connor (for Smith 40'), 23. Nevin Spence (for Seymour 65').

22 August 2010	Harlequins (England)	24-0	(Ireland) Ulster	Twickenham Stoop, London
	Try: Care; Monye; Marler; Con: Nick Evans (rugby union) (3); Pen: Nick Evans (rugby union)	Report
Ulster lineup: 1. Bryan Young, 2. Andi Kyriacou, 3. Declan Fitzpatrick, 4. Johann Muller, 5. Ryan Caldwell, 6. Pedrie Wannenburg, 7. T. J. Anderson, 8. Robbie Diack, 9. Ian Porter, 10. Niall O'Connor, 11. Nevin Spence, 12. Ian Whitten, 13. Darren Cave, 14. Craig Gilroy, 15. David McIlwaine.; Replacements: Nigel Brady (for Kyriacou 62'), Paul Karrayanis (for Young 76'), Adam Macklin (for Fitzpatrick 55'), Tim Barker (for Muller 55'), Neil McComb (for Wannenburg 70'), Michael Heaney (for Porter 71'), Ian Humphreys (for O'Connor 63'), Luke Marshall (for Whitten 48'), Jonny Shiels (for Cave 63'), Mark McCrea (for Spence 70').

26 August 2010	Ulster (Ireland)	19-16	(England) Leeds Carnegie	Ravenhill, Belfast
	Try: Cave; Seymour; Wannenburg; Con: O'Connor (2); Pen: Fury; Tinkell	Report	Pen: Thomas (2)
Ulster lineup: 1. Bryan Young, 2. Rory Best, 3. Declan Fitzpatrick, 4. Johann Muller, 5. Tim Barker, 6. Stephen Ferris, 7. Willie Faloon, 8. Pedrie Wannenburg, 9. Ian Porter, 10. Niall O'Connor, 11. Tommy Seymour, 12. Ian Whitten, 13. Darren Cave, 14. Craig Gilroy, 15. Adam D'Arcy.; Replacements: Nigel Brady (for Best 40'), Paul Karrayanis, Adam Macklin (for Fitzpatrick 69'), Ryan Caldwell (for Muller 62'), T. J. Anderson (for Wannenburg 66'), Robbie Diack (for Ferris 40'), Michael Heaney (for Porter 77'), Ian Humphreys (for O'Connor 62'), Jonny Shiels (for Gilroy 40'), David McIlwaine (for Cave 72').

== Ulster Women ==
=== 2011-12 Women's Interprovincial Series ===
7 November 2010	Leinster	30-3	Ulster	Donnybrook Stadium, Dublin
		Report

13 November 2010	Ulster	0-34	Munster	Ravenhill, Belfast
		Report

28 November 2010	Connacht	11-10	Ulster	The Sportsground, Galway
		Report

== Ulster Rugby Awards ==
The Ulster Rugby Awards ceremony was held on 10 May 2011 at the Culloden Hotel, Holywood. Winners were:

- Ulster Rugby Personality of the Year: Johann Muller
- Ulster Player of the Year: Ruan Pienaar
- Supporters Club Player of the Year: Johann Muller
- Young Ulster Player of the Year: Nevin Spence
- Ulster Academy Player of the Year: Craig Gilroy
- Most Improved Ulster Player of the Year: Adam D'Arcy
- Youth Player of the Year: Conall Doherty, City of Derry R.F.C.
- Club of the Year: City of Armagh RFC
- Club Player of the Year: Paul Pritchard, Ballymena RFC
- Schools Player of the Year: John Creighton, Campbell College
- Dorrington B. Faulkner Award: Ronnie Clements, Limavady RFC

== Season reviews ==
- "Review of Ulster's Season", Ulster Rugby, 1 June 2011
