= 2008–09 Ulster Rugby season =

Provincial professional playing season

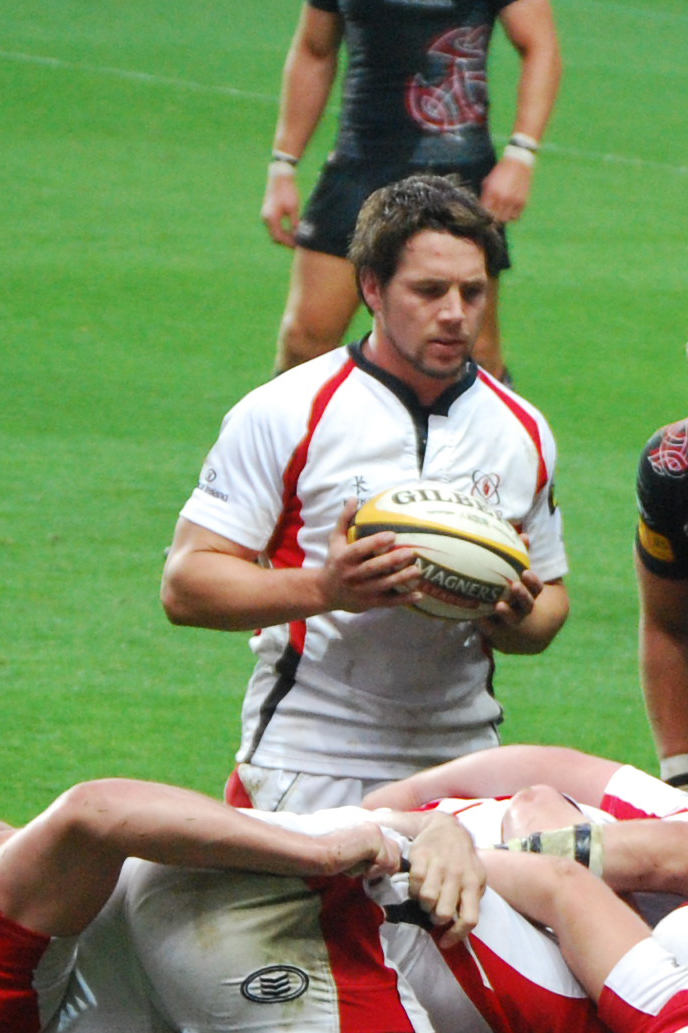
- Isaac Boss prepares to feed the scrum vs. Ospreys, Liberty Stadium, 27 September 2008
- Ground: Ravenhill Stadium (Capacity: 12,500)
- Coach: Matt Williams
- Captain: Rory Best
- Top scorer: Ian Humphreys (90)
- Most tries: Darren Cave (7); Simon Danielli (7)
- League(s): Heineken Cup (3rd in pool); Celtic League (8th)
1st kit	2nd kit

The 2008–09 Ulster Rugby season was Ulster's 15th season since the advent of professionalism in rugby union, and their only full season under head coach Matt Williams.

David Humphreys, who retired at the end of last season, was appointed to the newly created role of operations director, reporting to chief executive Michael Reid. Peter Sharp joined as defence coach in August 2008. Current player Paul Steinmetz was appointed backs coach. Former Ulster players Jonny Bell and Niall Malone joined the academy as Elite Player Development Officers.

New signings included Humphreys' younger brother Ian, who had been playing for Leicester Tigers since 2005. Fijian winger Timoci Nagusa joined from Tailevu Knights.

Ulster finished third in their Heineken Cup pool, and eighth in the Celtic League. One highlight of an otherwise disappointing season was a win over Munster at Thomond Park in January, the first time Munster had lost at home in European competition. Three of Ulster's five tries came from Ian Humphreys' assists. Ulster qualified for next season's Heineken Cup as one of Ireland's top three teams, finishing ahead of Connacht in the league. Matt Williams left by mutual consent at the end of the season. Assistant coach Steve Williams also left after his contract was not renewed. For the following season, Ulster put a new management structure in place. Michael Reid was chief executive; David Humphreys was director of rugby, with overall responsibility for the senior team, the Ulster 'A' team (renamed the Ulster Ravens), the Ulster under-20s and the academy; and Brian McLaughlin was appointed head coach, assisted by forwards coaches Jeremy Davidson and Peter Sharp, and backs coach Neil Doak.

Rory Best was Ulster's Player of the Year, and flanker Stephen Ferris was selected for the 2009 British & Irish Lions tour to South Africa.

== Staff ==
Position	Name	Nationality
Chief executive officer	Michael Reid	Ireland
Operations director	David Humphreys	Ireland
Director or coaching	Matt Williams	Australia
Assistant coach (forwards)	Steve Williams	Wales
Defence Coach	Peter Sharp	Australia
Backs coach/player	Paul Steinmetz	New Zealand
Skills coach	Neil Doak	Ireland
Scrum co-ordinator	Reggie Corrigan	Ireland
Team manager	David Millar	Ireland
Head of strength and conditioning	Jonny Davis	Ireland
Medical co-ordinator	Dr. David Irwin	Ireland
Assistant team doctor	Dr. Michael Webb	Ireland
Head physiotherapist	Gareth Robinson	Ireland
Physiotherapist	Alan McCaldin	Ireland
Performance analyst	Alex McCloy	Ireland
Resources manager	Mick Ennis	Australia
Team administration co-ordinator	Sarah Sherry	Ireland

== Squad ==
=== Senior squad ===
==== Players in ====
- (South Africa) BJ Botha from (South Africa) Natal Sharks
- (South Africa) Robbie Diack from (South Africa) Stormers
- (Ireland) Ian Humphreys from (England) Leicester Tigers
- (Fiji) Timoci Nagusa from (Fiji) Tailevu Knights
- (Ireland) Ed O'Donoghue from (Australia) Queensland Reds
- (New Zealand) Filo Paulo from (Ireland) Malone (short-term injury cover)
- (Australia) Daniel Roach from (Australia) New South Wales Waratahs
- (Australia) Clinton Schifcofske from (South Africa) Queensland Reds
- (Ireland) Cillian Willis from (Ireland) Leinster

==== Promoted from academy ====
- (Ireland) T. J. Anderson
- (Ireland) Mark McCrea

==== Players out ====
- (Ireland) Tim Barker to (France) Castres
- (Australia) Mark Bartholomeusz to (Italy) Padova
- (Ireland) Neil Best to (England) Northampton Saints
- (Ireland) Simon Best retired
- (Ireland) Tommy Bowe to (Wales) Ospreys
- (Ireland) Kieran Campbell to (Ireland) Connacht
- (Ireland) Niall Conlon released
- (Ireland) Kieran Hallett to (England) Plymouth Albion
- (Australia) Justin Harrison to (England) Bath Rugby
- (Ireland) David Humphreys retired
- (Australia) Adam Larkin retired
- (Wales) Matt Miles to (England) Cambridge
- (Ireland) Neil McMillan to (England) Harlequins
- (New Zealand) Grant Webb to (Wales) Newport Gwent Dragons
- (Ireland) Roger Wilson to (England) Northampton Saints

Ulster Rugby squad
**Props**: (South Africa) **BJ Botha** (22 apps, 22 starts, 5 pts); (Ireland) Tom Court (22 apps, 11 starts, 5 pts); (Ireland) **Justin Fitzpatrick** (16 apps, 8 starts); (Ireland) **Bryan Young** (8 apps, 5 starts); (Ireland) Declan Fitzpatrick (3 apps, 2 starts); (Australia) Daniel Roach (1 app); (Ireland) Jarlath Carey; **Hookers**: (Ireland) **Rory Best** (c) (20 apps, 19 starts); (Ireland) Nigel Brady (14 apps, 5 starts, 10 pts); (Ireland) Stuart Philpott (3 apps); (Ireland) Neil Hanna (1 app); **Locks**: (Ireland) Ed O'Donoghue (22 apps, 20 starts); (Ireland) Ryan Caldwell (21 apps, 18 starts); (Ireland) **Matt McCullough** (20 apps, 12 starts); (Italy) **Carlo Del Fava** (15 apps, 7 starts); (New Zealand) Filo Paulo (2 apps)	**Back row**: (South Africa) Robbie Diack* (20 apps, 19 starts); (Ireland) David Pollock (20 apps, 16 starts, 15 pts); (Ireland) **Stephen Ferris** (13 apps, 13 starts, 5 pts); (Ireland) Chris Henry (9 apps, 8 starts); (Ireland) Kieron Dawson (14 apps, 7 starts, 5 pts); (Ireland) T. J. Anderson (4 apps); (Ireland) Willie Faloon (1 app); **Scrum-halves**: (Ireland) **Isaac Boss** (23 apps, 16 starts, 10 pts); (Ireland) Cillian Willis (11 apps, 6 starts); (Ireland) Paul Marshall (7 apps, 4 starts, 5 pts); **Fly-halves**: (England) Niall O'Connor (17 apps, 12 starts, 30 pts); (Ireland) Ian Humphreys (17 apps, 11 starts, 113 pts)	**Centres**: (Ireland) Darren Cave (21 apps, 21 starts, 35 pts); (Ireland) **Paddy Wallace** (16 apps, 15 starts, 23 pts); (Ireland) **Andrew Trimble** (11 apps, 11 starts, 15 pts); (Ireland) Ian Whitten (8 apps, 5 starts); (New Zealand) Paul Steinmetz (10 apps, 4 starts, 5 pts); (Scotland) Rob Dewey (7 apps, 3 starts); (Ireland) Seamus Mallon (no apps); **Wings**: (Scotland) **Simon Danielli** (13 apps, 12 starts, 35 pts); (Fiji) **Timoci Nagusa** (13 apps, 10 starts, 20 pts); (Ireland) Mark McCrea (8 apps, 2 starts, 10 pts); (Ireland) Paul McKenzie (no apps); **Fullbacks**: (Australia) Clinton Schifcofske (19 apps, 17 starts, 60 pts); (Ireland) Bryn Cunningham (13 apps, 9 starts, 5 pts)
(c) denotes the team captain, **Bold** denotes internationally capped players. Italics denotes academy players who appeared in the senior team.^{*} denotes players qualified to play for Ireland on residency or dual nationality. Players and their allocated positions from the Ulster Rugby website.

=== Academy squad ===
==== Players in ====
- (Ireland) Nevin Spence
- (Ireland) Paddy McAllister
- (Ireland) Adam Macklin
- (Ireland) Ricky Andrew
- (Ireland) David McGregor
- (Ireland) Jonny Shiels

==== Players out ====
- (Ireland) Neil Simpson
- (Ireland) Pat Steenkamp
- (Ireland) Sam McDonald
- (Ireland) Mark Robinson
- (Ireland) Chris Quinn
- (Ireland) Owen McMurray
- (Ireland) Stephen Douglas

Position	Name	Nationality
High Performance Director	Gary Longwell	Ireland
Elite Player Development Officer	Jonny Bell	Ireland
Elite Player Development Officer	Niall Malone	Ireland
Strength & conditioning coach	Aaron Peck	England

Academy squad
**Props**: (Ireland) Paul Karayiannis (2); (Ireland) Adam Macklin (1); (Ireland) Paddy McAllister (1); **Hookers**: (Ireland) Stephen Douglas (3); (Ireland) David McGregor (1); **Locks**: (Ireland) James Sandford (2)	**Back row**: (Ireland) Willie Faloon (3); **Scrum-halves**: (Ireland) David Drake (3); (Ireland) Ian Porter (2); **Fly-halves**: none	**Centres**: (Ireland) Ian Whitten (2); (Ireland) Jonny Shiels (1); (Ireland) Nevin Spence (1); **Wings**: (Ireland) Chris Cochrane (2); (Ireland) Tommy Seymour (2); **Fullbacks**: (Ireland) Ricky Andrew (1); (Ireland) Jamie Smith (2)

== Season record ==
Competition	Played	Won	Drawn	Lost	PF	PA	PD	TF	TA
2008-09 Heineken Cup	6	2	1	3	113	134	-21	13	13
2008-09 Celtic League	18	7	0	11	298	331	-33	30	33
Total	24	9	1	14	411	465	-54	43	46

== Heineken Cup ==
=== Pool 4 ===
Team	P	W	D	L	Tries for	Tries against	Try diff	Points for	Points against	Points diff	TB	LB	Pts
(England) Harlequins (3)	6	5	0	1	16	12	4	144	115	29	2	0	22
(France) Stade Français	6	3	0	3	13	11	2	131	109	22	1	2	15
(Ireland) Ulster	6	2	1	3	13	13	0	113	134	−21	0	1	11
(Wales) Scarlets	6	1	1	4	12	18	−6	124	154	−30	0	2	8

11 October 2008	Ulster (Ireland)	10 – 26	(France) Stade Français	Ravenhill, Belfast
15:30	Try: Wallace 74' c Con: O'Connor (1/1); Pen: O'Connor (1) 49'	Report; Match centre	Try: Bousses 23' c Szarzewski 60' c Con: Beauxis (2/2); Pen: Beauxis (1) 15'; Drop: Hernández (2) 10', 26'; Beauxis (1) 63'	Attendance: 10,397
Ulster lineup: 1. Tom Court, 2. Rory Best (c), 3. BJ Botha, 4. Ed O'Donoghue, 5. Ryan Caldwell, 6. Stephen Ferris, 7. Kieron Dawson, 8. Robbie Diack, 9. Isaac Boss, 10. Niall O'Connor, 11. Andrew Trimble, 12. Paddy Wallace, 13. Darren Cave, 14. Clinton Schifcofske, 15. Bryn Cunningham.; Replacements: 16. Nigel Brady (for R. Best 74'), 17. Justin Fitzpatrick, 18. Carlo del Fava (for Steinmetz 57'), 19. Matt McCullough (for Ferris 68'), 20. Cillian Willis (for Boss 48'), 21. Ian Humphreys, 22. Paul Steinmetz (for Schifkofske 45').				Attendance: 10,397

18 October 2008	Harlequins (England)	42 – 21	(Ireland) Ulster	Twickenham Stoop, London
15:00	Try: Turner-Hall 15' m Williams (2) 26' m, 61' m Care 33' c Penalty Try 40' c Brown 43' c Con: Malone (3/6); Pen: Malone (2) 7', 66'; Cards: Care (yellow card) 51'	Report; Match centre	Try: Nagusa 2' c Wallace 52' c Trimble 57' c Con: O'Connor (3/3); Cards: McCullough (yellow card) 28'	Attendance: 12,368
Ulster lineup: 1. Tom Court, 2. Rory Best (c), 3. BJ Botha, 4. Carlo del Fava, 5. Ryan Caldwell, 6. Matt McCullough, 7. David Pollock, 8. Robbie Diack, 9. Cillian Willis, 10. Niall O'Connor, 11. Andrew Trimble, 12. Paddy Wallace, 13. Darren Cave, 14. Timoci Tagusa, 15. Bryn Cunningham.; Replacements: 16. Nigel Brady (for R. Best 72'), 17. Justin Fitzpatrick (for Court 47'), 18. Ed O'Donoghue (for Del Fava 47'), 19. Kieron Dawson (for Pollock 52'), 20. Isaac Boss (for Willis 66'), 21. Ian Humphreys (for O'Connor 63'), 22. Rob Dewey (for Wallace 66).				Attendance: 12,368

5 December 2008	Ulster (Ireland)	26 – 16	(Wales) Scarlets	Ravenhill, Belfast
20:00	Try: Cave 25' c Danielli 34' m Pollock 64' m Con: Humphreys (1/3); Pen: Humphreys (3) 7', 40', 59'; Cards: McCrea (yellow card) 71'	Report; Match centre	Try: Thomas 79' c Con: Jones (1/1); Pen: S. Jones (3) 10', 28', 47'	Attendance: 8,729
Ulster lineup: 1. Justin Fitzpatrick, 2. Rory Best (c), 3. BJ Botha, 4. Ed O'Donoghue, 5. Ryan Caldwell, 6. Stephen Ferris, 7. David Pollock, 8. Robbie Diack, 9. Cillian Willis, 10. Ian Humphreys, 11. Simon Danielli, 12. Paul Steinmetz, 13. Darren Cave, 14. Andrew Trimble, 15. Bryn Cunningham.; Replacements: 16. Nigel Brady, 17. Tom Court (for J. Fitzpatrick 52'), 18. Matt McCullough (for Ferris 69'), 19. Kieron Dawson (for Pollock 67'), 20. Isaac Boss (for Willis 52'), 21. Niall O'Connor (for Humphreys 72'), 22. Mark McCrea (for Steinmetz 69').				Attendance: 8,729

12 December 2008	Scarlets (Wales)	16 – 16	(Ireland) Ulster	Parc y Scarlets, Llanelli
20:00	Try: Daniel 46' c Con: Jones (1/1); Pen: S. Jones (3) 20', 53', 78'	Report; Match centre	Try: Humphreys 23' m Wallace 32' m Con: Humphreys (0/2); Pen: Humphreys 71'; Drop: Humphreys 12'	Attendance: 8,026
Ulster lineup: 1. Justin Fitzpatrick, 2. Rory Best (c), 3. BJ Botha, 4. Ed O'Donoghue, 5. Ryan Caldwell, 6. Stephen Ferris, 7. David Pollock, 8. Robbie Diack, 9. Isaac Boss, 10. Ian Humphreys, 11. Simon Danielli, 12. Paddy Wallace, 13. Darren Cave, 14. Andrew Trimble, 15. Bryn Cunningham.; Replacements: 16. Nigel Brady, 17. Tom Court (for Botha), 18. Matt McCullough (for Caldwell), 19. Kieron Dawson (for Pollock), 20. Paul Marshall, 21. Paul Steinmetz (for Cave), 22. Clinton Schifcofske (for Cunningham).				Attendance: 8,026

17 January 2009	Ulster (Ireland)	21 – 10	(England) Harlequins	Ravenhill, Belfast
14:35	Try: Cave 1' c R. Best 78' m Con: Humphreys (1/1); Schifcofske (0/1); Pen: Humphreys (3/3) 8', 29', 39'	Report; Match centre	Try: Penalty try 60' c Con: Evans (1/1); Pen: Evans (1/1) 43'; Malone (0/1); Cards: Care (yellow card) 35'	Attendance: 8,861
Ulster lineup: 1. Justin Fitzpatrick, 2. Rory Best (c), 3. Tom Court, 4. Ed O'Donoghue, 5. Ryan Caldwell, 6. Stephen Ferris, 7. Kieron Dawson, 8. Chris Henry, 9. Isaac Boss, 10. Ian Humphreys, 11. Simon Danielli, 12. Paddy Wallace, 13. Darren Cave, 14. Andrew Trimble, 15. Clinton Schifcofske.; Replacements: 16. Nigel Brady, 17. Bryan Young (for J. Fitzpatrick 61'), 18. Matt McCullough (for Henry 41'), 19. David Pollock (for Dawson 61'), 20. Paul Marshall, 21. Paul Steinmetz (for Humphreys 58'), 22. Bryn Cunningham (for Wallace 41').				Attendance: 8,861

24 January 2009	Stade Français (France)	24 – 19	(Ireland) Ulster	Stade Jean-Bouin, Paris
14:35	Try: Leguizamón 54' m Gasnier 77' c Con: Beauxis (1/2); Pen: Beauxis (4/6) 28', 29', 49', 58'; Cards: Rabadan (yellow card) 34'	Report; Match centre	Try: Steimetz 37' m Brady 80' m Con: O'Connor (0/1); Schifcofske (0/1); Pen: O'Connor (1/3) 15'; Schifcofske (2/3) 46', 72'	Attendance: 8,450
Ulster lineup: 1. Bryan Young, 2. Nigel Brady, 3. BJ Botha, 4. Ed O'Donoghue, 5. Ryan Caldwell, 6. Matt McCullough, 7. David Pollock (c), 8. Chris Henry, 9. Paul Marshall, 10. Niall O'Connor, 11. Simon Danielli, 12. Ian Whitten, 13. Paul Steinmetz, 14. Andrew Trimble, 15. Clinton Schifcofske.; Replacements: 16. Stuart Philpott (for Brady 73'), 17. Tom Court (for Young 52'), 18. Kieron Dawson (for Henry 48'), 19. Willie Faloon (for McCullough 71'), 20. Isaac Boss (for Marshall 47'), 21. Rob Dewey, 22. Mark McCrea (for Danielli 76').				Attendance: 8,450

== Celtic League ==
	Team	Pld	W	D	L	PF	PA	PD	TF	TA	Try bonus	Losing bonus	Pts
1	(Ireland) Munster	18	14	0	4	405	257	+148	49	23	6	1	63
2	(Scotland) Edinburgh	18	11	0	7	416	296	+120	40	30	6	5	55
3	(Ireland) Leinster	18	11	1	6	401	270	+131	38	20	4	2	52
4	(Wales) Ospreys	18	11	0	7	397	319	+78	39	28	3	5	52
5	(Wales) Scarlets	18	9	0	9	376	395	−19	41	46	3	1	40
6	(Wales) Cardiff Blues	18	8	1	9	322	361	−39	31	36	2	2	38
7	(Scotland) Glasgow Warriors	18	7	0	11	349	375	−26	36	41	4	5	37
8	(Ireland) Ulster	18	7	0	11	298	331	−33	30	33	2	6	36
9	(Wales) Newport Gwent Dragons	18	7	0	11	305	429	−124	26	39	1	4	33
10	(Ireland) Connacht	18	4	0	14	224	460	−236	20	54	1	3	20
Under the standard bonus point system, points are awarded as follows: 4 points for a win; 2 points for a draw; 1 bonus point for scoring 4 tries (or more) (Try bonus); 1 bonus point for losing by 7 points (or fewer) (Losing bonus)
Source: RaboDirect PRO12

5 September 2008	Ulster (Ireland)	9–16	(Wales) Scarlets	Ravenhill, Belfast
19:30	Pen: Schifcofske (3)	Report; Match centre	Try: Daniel; Con: Jones; Pen: Jones (3)	Attendance: 7,368
Ulster lineup: 1. Justin Fitzpatrick, 2. Rory Best, 3. BJ Botha, 4. Carlo del Fava, 5. Ed O'Donoghue, 6. Matt McCullough, 7. Kieron Dawson, 8. Robbie Diack, 9. Isaac Boss, 10. Paddy Wallace, 11. Timoci Nagusa, 12. Rob Dewey, 13. Darren Cave, 14. Andrew Trimble, 15. Clinton Schifcofske.; Replacements: 16. Nigel Brady, 17. Tom Court (for Botha 66'), 18. Ryan Caldwell (for Del Fava 23'), 19. David Pollock (for Dawson 66'), 20. Cillian Willis, 21. Niall O'Connor, 22. Bryn Cunningham.				Attendance: 7,368

12 September 2008	Cardiff Blues (Wales)	16–15	(Ireland) Ulster	Cardiff City Stadium
19:05	Try: Halfpenny; Con: Blair; Pen: Blair (3)	Report; Match centre	Try: Botha; Boss; Con: O'Connor; Pen: O'Connor	Attendance: 8,619
Ulster lineup: 1. Tom Court, 2. Rory Best, 3. BJ Botha, 4. Ryan Caldwell, 5. Ed O'Donoghue, 6. Matt McCullough, 7. David Pollock, 8. Robbie Diack, 9. Isaac Boss, 10. Niall O'Connor, 11. Timoci Nagusa, 12. Paddy Wallace, 13. Darren Cave, 14. Andrew Trimble, 15. Clinton Schifcofske.; Replacements: 16. Nigel Brady, 17. Justin Fitzpatrick (for Court 48'), 18. Kieron Dawson, 19. TJ Anderson (for Pollock 42'), 20. Cillian Willis, 21. Rob Dewey (for Wallace 12'), 22. Bryn Cunningham (for Schifcofske 20').				Attendance: 8,619

19 September 2008	Ulster (Ireland)	14–16	(Wales) Newport Gwent Dragons	Ravenhill, Belfast
19:30	Try: Dawson; Humphreys; Con: Schifcofske (2)	Report; Match centre	Try: Smith; Con: Arlidge; Pen: Arlidge (3); Cards: Fussell (yellow card)	Attendance: 7,885
Ulster lineup: 1. Tom Court, 2. Rory Best, 3. BJ Botha, 4. Ryan Caldwell, 5. Ed O'Donoghue, 6. Matt McCullough, 7. Kieron Dawson, 8. Robbie Diack, 9. Isaac Boss, 10. Niall O'Connor, 11. Timoci Nagusa, 12. Rob Dewey, 13. Darren Cave, 14. Andrew Trimble, 15. Clinton Schifcofske.; Replacements: 16. Nigel Brady, 17. Justin Fitzpatrick (for Court 61'), 18. Carlo del Fava (for O'Donoghue 61'), 19. TJ Anderson (for McCullough 66'), 20. Paddy Wallace (for Boss 61'), 21. Ian Humphreys (for O'Connor 36'), 22. Bryn Cunningham (for Dewey 72').				Attendance: 7,885

27 September 2008	Ospreys (Wales)	43–0	(Ireland) Ulster	Liberty Stadium, Swansea
17:30	Try: Wells; Hook (2); Williams; Bowe; Byrne; Jones; Con: Hook (5); Pen: Hook	Report; Match centre	Cards: Botha (yellow card); McCullough (yellow card)	Attendance: 7,225
Ulster lineup: 1. Justin Fitzpatrick, 2. Nigel Brady, 3. BJ Botha, 4. Carlo del Fava, 5. Ryan Caldwell, 6. Matt McCullough, 7. Kieron Dawson, 8. Robbie Diack, 9. Isaac Boss, 10. Niall O'Connor, 11. Clinton Schifcofske, 12. Andrew Trimble, 13. Rob Dewey, 14. Timoci Nagusa, 15. Bryn Cunningham.; Replacements: 16. Stuart Philpott (for Brady 66'), 17. Tom Court (for Fitzpatrick 51'), 18. Ed O'Donoghue (for Caldwell 67'), 19. Stephen Ferris (for McCullough 59'), 20. Paul Marshall (for Boss (68'), 21. Ian Humphreys (for O'Connor 70'), 22. Paul Steinmetz (for Cunningham 30').				Attendance: 7,225

3 October 2008	Ulster (Ireland)	13–9	(Scotland) Edinburgh	Ravenhill, Belfast
19:30	Try: Pollock; Con: Schifcofske; Pen: Schifcofske	Report; Match centre	Pen: Blair (2); Godman	Attendance: 8,418
Ulster lineup: 1. Tom Court, 2. Rory Best, 3. BJ Botha, 4. Ed O'Donoghue, 5. Ryan Caldwell, 6. Stephen Ferris, 7. David Pollock, 8. Robbie Diack, 9. Cillian Willis, 10. Niall O'Connor, 11. Andrew Trimble, 12. Paul Steinmetz, 13. Darren Cave, 14. Clinton Schifcofske, 15. Bryn Cunningham.; Replacements: 16. Nigel Brady, 17. Justin Fitzpatrick (for Court 60'), 18. Carlo del Fava (for O'Donoghue 60'), 19. Matt McCullough (for Ferris 76'), 20. Isaac Boss (for Willis 43'), 21. Ian Humphreys, 22. Timoci Nagusa.				Attendance: 8,418

25 October 2008	Ulster (Ireland)	22–6	(Ireland) Munster	Ravenhill, Belfast
19:30	Try: Nagusa (2); Boss; Con: Humphreys (2); Pen: Humphreys; Cards: Caldwell (yellow card)	Report; Match centre	Pen: Warwick	Attendance: 10,058
Ulster lineup: 1. Justin Fitzpatrick, 2. Rory Best, 3. BJ Botha, 4. Ed O'Donoghue, 5. Ryan Caldwell, 6. Stephen Ferris, 7. David Pollock, 8. Robbie Diack, 9. Cillian Willis, 10. Niall O'Connor, 11. Andrew Trimble, 12. Paddy Wallace, 13. Darren Cave, 14. Timoci Nagusa, 15. Bryn Cunningham.; Replacements: 16. Nigel Brady (for R. Best 73'), 17. Tom Court (for Fitzpatrick 47'), 18. Carlo del Fava (for Caldwell 47'), 19. TJ Anderson (for Ferris 71'), 20. Isaac Boss (for Willis 52'), 21. Ian Humphreys (for O'Connor 12'), 22. Mark McCrea (for Cunningham 71').				Attendance: 10,058

28 November 2008	Ulster (Ireland)	53–13	(Ireland) Connacht	Ravenhill, Belfast
19:30	Try: Ferris; Nagusa; Danielli (2); McCrea; Cave; Cunningham; Con: Humphreys (6); Pen: Humphreys (2)	Report; Match centre	Try: Carr; Con: Keatley; Pen: Keatley (2)	Attendance: 8,841
Ulster lineup: 1. Justin Fitzpatrick, 2. Rory Best, 3. BJ Botha, 4. Ed O'Donoghue, 5. Ryan Caldwell, 6. Stephen Ferris, 7. David Pollock, 8. Robbie Diack, 9. Cillian Willis, 10. Ian Humphreys, 11. Mark McCrea, 12. Paddy Wallace, 13. Darren Cave, 14. Timoci Nagusa, 15. Bryn Cunningham.; Replacements: 16. Nigel Brady (for R. Best 67'), 17. Tom Court (for Fitzpatrick 56'), 18. Matt McCullough (for Ferris 63'), 19. Kieron Dawson, 20. Isaac Boss (for Willis 67'), 21. Paul Steinmetz (for Wallace 1'), 22. Simon Danielli (for Nagusa 36').				Attendance: 8,841

27 December 2008	Ulster (Ireland)	13–21	(Ireland) Leinster	Ravenhill, Belfast
19:30	Try: Cave; Con: Humphreys; Pen: Humphreys (2)	Report; Match centre	Try: Elsom; Keogh; Con: Contepomi; Pen: Contepomi (3)	Attendance: 13,500
Ulster lineup: 1. Justin Fitzpatrick, 2. Rory Best, 3. BJ Botha, 4. Ed O'Donoghue, 5. Matt McCullough, 6. Stephen Ferris, 7. David Pollock, 8. Robbie Diack, 9. Isaac Boss, 10. Ian Humphreys, 11. Andrew Trimble, 12. Paddy Wallace, 13. Darren Cave, 14. Timoci Nagusa, 15. Bryn Cunningham.; Replacements: 16. Nigel Brady, 17. Tom Court (for Fitzpatrick 48'), 18. TJ Anderson (for Ferris 69'), 19. Kieron Dawson (for Pollock 62'), 20. Paul Marshall, 21. Paul Steinmetz, 22. Clinton Schifcofske (for Cunningham 41').				Attendance: 13,500

3 January 2009	Munster (Ireland)	11–37	(Ireland) Ulster	Thomond Park, Limerick
19:30	Try: Howlett; Pen: Warwick (2); Cards: Pucciariello (yellow card)	Report; Match centre	Try: Wallace; Cave; McCrea; Court; Trimble; Con: Humphreys (3); Pen: Humphreys (2); Cards: McCullough (yellow card); Dawson (yellow card)	Attendance: 25,623
Ulster lineup: 1. Tom Court, 2. Nigel Brady, 3. BJ Botha, 4. Ed O'Donoghue, 5. Matt McCullough, 6. Stephen Ferris, 7. Kieron Dawson, 8. Robbie Diack, 9. Isaac Boss, 10. Ian Humphreys, 11. Timoci Nagusa, 12. Paddy Wallace, 13. Darren Cave, 14. Andrew Trimble, 15. Clinton Schifkofske.; Replacements: 16. Rory Best (for Brady 68'), 17. Justin Fitzpatrick (for Court 61'), 18. Filo Paulo (for McCullough 57'), 19. David Pollock (for Dawson 68'), 20. Paul Marshall (for Boss 75'), 21. Paul Steinmetz, 22. Mark McCrea (for Nagusa 13').				Attendance: 25,623

9 January 2009	Edinburgh (Scotland)	21–15	(Ireland) Ulster	Murrayfield, Edinburgh
19:45	Try: Southwell; Hamilton; Con: Godman; Pen: Godman (3)	Report; Match centre	Pen: Humphreys (4); Wallace	Attendance: 3,393
Ulster lineup: 1. Tom Court, 2. Rory Best, 3. BJ Botha, 4. Ed O'Donoghue, 5. Matt McCullough, 6. Stephen Ferris, 7. David Pollock, 8. Robbie Diack, 9. Isaac Boss, 10. Ian Humphreys, 11. Andrew Trimble, 12. Paddy Wallace, 13. Darren Cave, 14. Mark McCrea, 15. Clinton Schifkofske.; Replacements: 16. Nigel Brady (for Best 68'), 17. Justin Fitzpatrick (for Court 50'), 18. Filo Paulo (for Diack 32'), 19. Kieron Dawson (for Pollock 62'), 20. Paul Marshall (for Boss 73'), 21. Paul Steinmetz (for Humphreys 69'), 22. Bryn Cunningham (for Cave 67').				Attendance: 3,393

22 February 2009	Newport Gwent Dragons (Wales)	26–16	(Ireland) Ulster	Rodney Parade, Newport
16:10	Try: Tovey (3); Con: Tovey; Pen: Connor; Tovey (2); Cards: Thomas (yellow card)	Report; Match centre	Try: Danielli; Con: Humphreys; Pen: Humphreys; Schifcofske (2); Cards: Court (yellow card); Pollock (yellow card)	Attendance: 6,112
Ulster lineup: 1. Tom Court, 2. Nigel Brady, 3. BJ Botha, 4. Ed O'Donoghue, 5. Carlo del Fava, 6. David Pollock, 7. Kieron Dawson, 8. Chris Henry, 9. Isaac Boss, 10. Ian Humphreys, 11. Simon Danielli, 12. Paul Steinmetz, 13. Darren Cave, 14. Andrew Trimble, 15. Clinton Schifkofske.; Replacements: 16. Stuart Philpott (for Brady 53'), 17. Brian Young (for Court 58'), 18. Ryan Caldwell (for McCullough 69'), 19. Matt McCullough (for Henry 64'), 20. Cillian Willis (for Boss 48'), 21. Niall O'Connor (for Humphreys 69'), 22. Ian Whitten (for Steinmetz 45').				Attendance: 6,112

7 March 2009	Ulster (Ireland)	12–0	(Scotland) Glasgow Warriors	Ravenhill, Belfast
19:30	Try: Cave; Trimble; Con: Humphreys; Cards: J. Fitzpatrick (yellow card)	Report; Match centre	Cards: Tkachuk (yellow card)	Attendance: 8,286
Ulster lineup: 1. Justin Fitzpatrick, 2. Rory Best, 3. BJ Botha, 4. Ryan Caldwell, 5. Ed O'Donoghue, 6. Matt McCullough, 7. David Pollock, 8. Chris Henry, 9. Isaac Boss, 10. Ian Humphreys, 11. Simon Danielli, 12. Ian Whitten, 13. Darren Cave, 14. Andrew Trimble, 15. Clinton Schifkofske.; Replacements: 16. Nigel Brady, 17. Tom Court (for Botha 41'), 18. Carlo del Fava (for O'Donoghue 63'), 19. Kieron Dawson (for McCullough 63'), 20. Cillian Willis, 21. Niall O'Connor (for Humphreys 65'), 22. Mark McCrea (for Danielli 71').				Attendance: 8,286

29 March 2009	Leinster (Ireland)	32–6	(Ireland) Ulster	RDS Arena, Dublin
17:30	Try: McFadden; Cullen; Elsom; Keogh; Con: Contepomi (3); Pen: Contepomi (2)	Report; Match centre	Pen: Humphreys; Schifcofske; Cards: Diack (yellow card)	Attendance: 15,940
Ulster lineup: 1. Tom Court, 2. Rory Best, 3. BJ Botha, 4. Ed O'Donoghue, 5. Ryan Caldwell, 6. Matt McCullough, 7. David Pollock, 8. Chris Henry, 9. Isaac Boss, 10. Ian Humphreys, 11. Simon Danielli, 12. Paddy Wallace, 13. Darren Cave, 14. Andrew Trimble, 15. Clinton Schifkofske.; Replacements: 16. Nigel Brady (for Best 70'), 17. Bryan Young (for Court 54'), 18. Carlo del Fava (for O'Donoghue 56'), 19. Robbie Diack (for McCullough 54'), 20. Cillian Willis (for Boss 64'), 21. Ian Whitten (for Humphreys 55'), 22. Timoci Nagusa (for Cave 69').				Attendance: 15,940

3 April 2009	Ulster (Ireland)	13–16	(Wales) Ospreys	Ravenhill, Belfast
19:35	Try: Danielli; Con: Schifcofske; Pen: Schifcofske (2)	Report; Match centre	Try: Tiatia; Con: Hook; Pen: Hook (3)	Attendance: 9,600
Ulster lineup: 1. Bryan Young, 2. Rory Best, 3. BJ Botha, 4. Ed O'Donoghue, 5. Ryan Caldwell, 6. Chris Henry, 7. David Pollock, 8. Robbie Diack, 9. Isaac Boss, 10. Niall O'Connor, 11. Andrew Trimble, 12. Paddy Wallace, 13. Darren Cave, 14. Simon Danielli, 15. Clinton Schifkofske.; Replacements: 16. Nigel Brady, 17. Tom Court (for Young 74'), 18. Carlo del Fava (for Caldwell 71'), 19. Willie Faloon, 20. Cillian Willis, 21. Ian Whitten, 22. Timoci Nagusa.				Attendance: 9,600

17 April 2009	Glasgow Warriors (Scotland)	19–20	(Ireland) Ulster	Firhill Stadium, Glasgow
19:30	Try: Evans; Con: Gregor; Pen: Gregor (2); Parks; Cards: Low (yellow card)	Report; Match centre	Try: Pollock; Danielli; Con: Schifcofske (2); Pen: Schifcofske (2); Cards: Young (yellow card)	Attendance: 2,960
Ulster lineup: 1. Bryan Young, 2. Rory Best, 3. BJ Botha, 4. Carlo del Fava, 5. Ryan Caldwell, 6. Stephen Ferris, 7. David Pollock, 8. Robbie Diack, 9. Paul Marshall, 10. Niall O'Connor, 11. Simon Danielli, 12. Paddy Wallace, 13. Ian Whitten, 14. Andrew Trimble, 15. Clinton Schifkofske.; Replacements: 16. Nigel Brady, 17. Daniel Roach, 18. Matt McCullough, 19. Chris Henry, 20. Isaac Boss, 21. Ian Humphreys, 22. Darren Cave.				Attendance: 2,960

24 April 2009	Ulster (Ireland)	9–11	(Wales) Cardiff Blues	Ravenhill, Belfast
19:30	Pen: Schifcofske; O'Connor; Drop: O'Connor; Cards: Botha (yellow card)	Report; Match centre	Try: Loxton; Pen: Sweeney; Cards: Gill (yellow card)	Attendance: 7,809
Ulster lineup: 1. Bryan Young, 2. Rory Best, 3. BJ Botha, 4. Carlo del Fava, 5. Ryan Caldwell, 6. Stephen Ferris, 7. David Pollock, 8. Robbie Diack, 9. Paul Marshall, 10. Niall O'Connor, 11. Simon Danielli, 12. Paddy Wallace, 13. Darren Cave, 14. Andrew Trimble, 15. Clinton Schifkofske.; Replacements: 16. Nigel Brady, 17. Tom Court, 18. Matt McCullough, 19. Chris Henry, 20. Isaac Boss, 21. Ian Whitten, 22. Timoci Nagusa.				Attendance: 7,809

8 May 2009	Connacht (Ireland)	12–14	(Ireland) Ulster	The Sportsground, Galway
19:00	Try: Carr; Browne; Con: Keatley	Report; Match centre	Try: Danielli; Pen: Humphreys (2); Schifcofske	Attendance: 1,425
Ulster lineup: 1. Tom Court, 2. Rory Best, 3. BJ Botha, 4. Ed O'Donoghue, 5. Carlo del Fava, 6. Stephen Ferris, 7. Chris Henry, 8. Robbie Diack, 9. Paul Marshall, 10. Ian Humphreys, 11. Simon Danielli, 12. Ian Whitten, 13. Darren Cave, 14. Clinton Schifcofkse, 15. Isaac Boss.; Replacements: 16. Nigel Brady (for Best 80'), 17. Bryan Young (for Court 64'), 18. Ryan Caldwell (for Del Fava 51'), 19. Matt McCullough, 20. Niall O'Connor (for Humphreys 51'), 21. Rob Dewey (for Cave 72'), 22. Timoci Nagusa (for Whitten 64').				Attendance: 1,425

16 May 2009	Scarlets (Wales)	43–17	(Ireland) Ulster	Parc y Scarlets, Llanelli
19:30	Try: Evans; Day; Williams; Daniel; Roberts; Lyons; Con: Priestland (5); Pen: Priestland	Report; Match centre	Try: Paul Marshall; Cave; Con: O'Connor; Humphreys; Drop: O'Connor; Cards: Diack (yellow card)	Attendance: 6,219
Ulster lineup: 1. Bryan Young, 2. Nigel Brady, 3. Declan Fitzpatrick, 4. Ed O'Donoghue, 5. Ryan Caldwell, 6. Matt McCullough, 7. Chris Henry, 8. Robbie Diack, 9. Paul Marshall, 10. Niall O'Connor, 11. Simon Danielli, 12. Ian Whitten, 13. Darren Cave, 14. Timoci Nagusa, 15. Isaac Boss.; Replacements: 16. Neil Hanna (for D. Fitzpatrick 69'), 17. Justin Fitzpatrick (for Young 57'), 18. Carlo del Fava (for O'Donoghue 41'), 19. David Pollock (for Henry 41'); 20. Ian Humphreys (for O'Connor 52'), 21. Mark McCrea (for Danielli 64'), 22. Clinton Schifcofke.				Attendance: 6,219

== Home attendance ==
Domestic League					European Cup					Total	
League	Fixtures	Average Attendance	Highest	Lowest	League	Fixtures	Average Attendance	Highest	Lowest	Total Attendance	Average Attendance
2008–09 Celtic League	9	9,085	13,500	7,368	2008–09 Heineken Cup	3	9,329	10,397	8,729	109,752	9,146

== Friendlies ==
15 August 2008	Ulster (Ireland)	7-15	(England) Bath	Ravenhill, Belfast
	Try: Cave; Con: Schifcofske	Report	Try: Crane (2); Con: Berne; Pen: Kydd
Ulster lineup: 1. Justin Fitzpatrick, 2. Nigel Brady, 3. Tom Court, 4. Ed O'Donoghue, 5. Carlo Del Fava, 6. Matt McCullough, 7. Kieron Dawson, 8. Robbie Diack, 9. Cillian Willis, 10. Niall O'Connor, 11. Timoci Nagusa, 12. Rob Dewey, 13. Darren Cave, 14. Chris Cochrane, 15. Clinton Schifcofske.; Replacements: Neil Hanna, Jarlath Carey, Filo Paulo, Chris Henry, Paul Marshall, Bryn Cunningham, Ian Whitten, Willie Faloon, T. J. Anderson, Seamus Mallon.

22 August 2008	Ulster (Ireland)	24-0	(Australia) Queensland Reds	Ravenhill, Belfast
	Try: Dewey; Cochrane; Nagusa; Con: Schifcofske (2); Wallace; Pen: Schifcofske	Report
Ulster lineup: 1. Bryan Young, 2. Rory Best, 3. Tom Court, 4. Ed O'Donoghue, 5. Matt McCullough, 6. T. J. Anderson, 7. David Pollock, 8. Robbie Diack, 9. Isaac Boss, 10. Ian Humphreys, 11. Chris Cochrane, 12. Paddy Wallace, 13. Darren Cave, 14. Timoci Nagusa, 15. Clinton Schifcofske.; Replacements: Neil Hanna (for Best 57'), Jarlath Carey (for Court 65'), Chris Henry (for Anderson 70'), Filo Paulo (for McCullough 33'), Cillian Willis (for Cave 68'), Rob Dewey (for Humphreys 40'), Bryn Cunningham (for Schifcofske 56')

27 August 2008	Ulster (Ireland)	10-23	(England) Worcester Warriors	Ravenhill, Belfast
	Try: McCrea; Con: Humphreys; Pen: Humphreys	Report	Try: Bowley; Talei; Powell; Con: Jones; Pen: Jones; Crichton
Ulster lineup: 1. Tom Court, 2. Nigel Brady, 3. Bryan Young, 4. Carlo Del Fava, 5. Ryan Caldwell, 6. Matt McCullough, 7. Kieron Dawson, 8. Chris Henry, 9. Paul Marshall, 10. Ian Humphreys, 11. Mark McCrea, 12. Paul Steinmetz, 13. Andrew Trimble, 14. Timoci Nagusa, 15. Bryn Cunningham.; Replacements: Stuart Philpott, Justin Fitzpatrick, Filo Paulo, Willie Faloon, Cillian Willis, T. J. Anderson, Niall O'Connor, Ian Whitten, Rob Dewey, Robbie Diack.

13 November 2008	Ulster (Ireland)	62–6	Portugal	Ravenhill, Belfast
19:30	Try: Cave (4); McCrea (2); Nagusa (2); Hanna; Whitten; Con: Humphreys (3); O'Connor (3)	Report	Pen: Cabral (2)
Ulster lineup: 1. Bryan Young, 2. Neil Hanna, 3. Declan Fitzpatrick, 4. Filo Paulo, 5. Ed O'Donoghue, 6. TJ Anderson, 7. David Pollock (c), 8. Robbie Diack, 9. Cillian Willis, 10. Ian Humphreys, 11. Mark McCrea, 12. Ian Whitten, 13. Darren Cave, 14. Timoci Nagusa, 15. Bryn Cunningham.; Replacements: 16. Nigel Brady, 17. Jarlath Carey, 18. Justin Fitzpatrick, 19. Kieron Dawson, 20. Isaac Boss, 21. Niall O'Connor, 22. Paul Steinmetz, 23. Chris Henry, 24. James Sandford, 25. Chris Cochrane.

== Ulster Rugby Awards ==
The Ulster Rugby Awards ceremony was held on 14 May 2009 at the Ramada Hotel, Belfast. Winners were:

- Ulster Rugby Personality of the Year: Stephen Ferris
- Rugby Writers Player of the Year: Stephen Ferris
- Ulster Player of the Year: Rory Best
- Young Ulster Player of the Year: Darren Cave
- Academy Player of the Year: Willie Faloon
- Schools' Player of the Year: Niall Annett, Methodist College Belfast
- Club of the Year: Ballynahinch RFC
- Club Player of the Year: Chris Stevenson, Ballynahinch RFC
- Youth Player of the Year: Stephen Irvine, Banbridge RFC
- Dorrington B. Faulkner Award: William Davidson, Armagh
