= Paddy McAllister =

- Born: Patrick Robert McAllister; 20 July 1989 (age 37) Lisburn, Northern Ireland
- Height: 1.86 m (6 ft 1 in)
- Weight: 124 kg (19 st 7 lb)
- School: The Royal School, Armagh

Rugby union career
- Position: Prop
Amateur team(s)
Years	Team	Apps	(Points)
- Ballynahinch
2021-	Belfast Harlequins		
Senior career
Years	Team	Apps	(Points)
2010–2014	Ulster	44	(0)
2014–2015	Aurillac	16	(0)
2015–2019	Gloucester	66	(15)
2019–2021	Connacht	18	(5)
- Correct as of 6 June 2021
International career
Years	Team	Apps	(Points)
2009	Ireland U20	10	(0)
- Correct as of 21 June 2009

Paddy McAllister (born 20 July 1989) is an Irish rugby union player and coach who played professionally as a prop for Ulster, Aurillac, Gloucester and Connacht.

Born in Lisburn, Northern Ireland, McAllister grew up in the Democratic Republic of Congo, where his father was a Christian missionary and aid worker for Tearfund. He returned to Northern Ireland at the age of 14, and attended The Royal School, Armagh, where he started playing rugby. He represented Ireland at schools, under-19 and under-20 level, appearing at the 2009 under-20 World Championship, and played club rugby for Ballynahinch.

He joined the Ulster Rugby academy for the 2008–09 season. He signed a development contract ahead of the 2010–11 season, and made his debut for the senior team against Ospreys in September 2010 He made 15 appearances, including eight starts, in the Pro12 that season, as well as four appearances off the bench in the Heineken Cup. The following season he made 16 appearances, including eight starts, in the Pro12, and five appearances, including one start, in the Heieneken Cup. He was named in the Ireland squad for the 2012 Six Nations Championship, but was unable to play because of a minor knee injury.

In August 2012 he sustained a serious knee injury while training in France, and two months later his close friend and teammate Nevin Spence died, leading to a period of depression. In the summer of 2014 he moved to Aurillac in the French second division, then coached by former Ulster player Jeremy Davidson. The following season he was signed by another former Ulster player, David Humphreys, to play for Gloucester in the English Premiership. After four season with Gloucester, he returned to Ireland with Connacht.

In August 2020, his wife Deborah suffered a stroke while pregnant with their third child. She made a full recovery and the child was born healthy, but McAllister decided that "family had to come first", and announced his retirement at the end of the 2020–21 season. After retiring as a professional player, he took a job as head of commercial and income revenue for All-Ireland League club Belfast Harlequins, while also playing and coaching for the club. Paddy moved to Banbridge RFC in 2023 to take up the role as assistant coach.

McAllister is a devout Christian.
