= Adam D'Arcy =

Australian rugby union player

- Born: 3 October 1985 (age 41) Sydney, Australia
- Height: 1.84 m (6 ft 1/2 in)
- Weight: 86 kg (13 st 8 lb; 190 lb)

Rugby union career
- Position: Fullback
Senior career
Years	Team	Apps	(Points)
2010–2013	Ulster	54	(35)
2013	Manly	5	(5)
2013–2014	Bristol	11	(5)
- Correct as of 6 August 2022

Adam D'Arcy (born 3 October 1985) is an Australian former rugby union player who played fullback professionally for Ulster and Bristol.

Originally from Sydney, Australia, D'Arcy was educated at St Joseph's College, Hunters Hill, and played club rugby in the Shute Shield for Northern Suburbs Rugby Club and Manly RUFC. He tried out unsuccessfully for Western Force, and in 2009 he was offered a development contract with the New South Wales Waratahs. Irish-qualified through a grandfather from County Tipperary, he was offered a trial with Ulster in 2010, and after impressing in a friendly against Leeds in August, signed a one-year contract for the 2010–11 season. He made 20 appearances in his first season, scoring four tries, was named Ulster's most improved player at the province's end-of-season awards, and signed a new two-year deal.

The following season he made 26 appearances, including a substitute appearance in the 2012 Heineken Cup Final, and scored three tries. In 2012-13 he was kept out of the team by a knee injury and the form of Jared Payne, and he only made four appearances. His contract expired in June 2013. He played five times for Manly in the Shute Shield in July and August 2013, and signed for English Championship club Bristol for the 2013–14 season. He was released at the end of the season, having made eleven appearances and scored one try.
