= Darren Cave =

Irish rugby union player

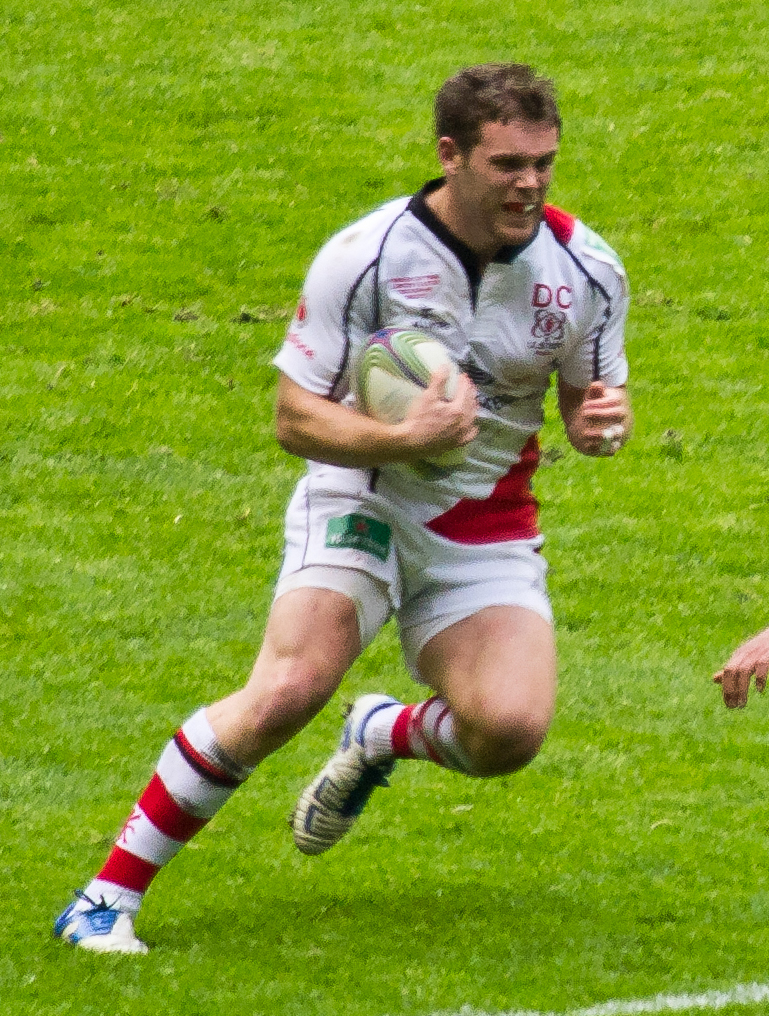
- Darren Cave, Heineken Cup final, 2012
- Born: Darren Cave; 5 April 1987 (age 39) Holywood, Northern Ireland
- Height: 1.83 m (6 ft 0 in)
- Weight: 93 kg (14 st 9 lb)
- School: Sullivan Upper School

Rugby union career
- Position: Centre
Amateur team(s)
Years	Team	Apps	(Points)
- Belfast Harlequins
Senior career
Years	Team	Apps	(Points)
2007–2019	Ulster	229	(229)
- Correct as of 30 March 2019
International career
Years	Team	Apps	(Points)
2007	Ireland U20	5	(10)
2007–2014	Ireland Wolfhounds	11	(30)
2009–2015	Ireland	11	(10)
2008	Ireland Sevens		
- Correct as of 27 September 2015

Darren Cave (born 5 April 1987) is a retired professional Irish rugby union player who played centre for Ulster, sharing the province's appearance record with Andrew Trimble and Rob Herring with 229, and won eleven caps for Ireland.

== Early career ==
Cave attended Sullivan Upper School, and helped them win the Medallion Shield in 2002, scoring a try, a conversion and the winning penalty in the final. He represented Ireland at schools level, including for a tour of Australia 2004. The same year, he was nominated for the Ulster Schools Player of the Year award. In 2005 he joined Belfast Harlequins represented Ireland at the under-19 World Cup, and joined the Ulster Rugby academy in 2005. He was part of the Ireland under-20 team that won a Grand Slam in the under-20 Six Nations in 2007.

== Ulster Rugby ==
After scoring two hat-tricks in consecutive weeks for Belfast Harlequins, Cave made his first senior start for Ulster against the Dragons in October 2007, He became a regular in the side in the 2008–09 season, making 21 starts and scoring seven tries, and was named Ulster Rugby Young Player of the Year.

In 2010–11 Cave struggled with injuries but returned towards the end of the season and scored some vital tries as Ulster reached the quarter-finals of the Heineken Cup and semi-finals of the Magners League. Cave showed excellent form on his return to action but picked up another injury in early 2012, just as he looked likely to be included in Ireland's Six Nations squad. He made another magnificent comeback as Ulster made the Heineken Cup final for just the second time in their history, but they lost to Leinster in the 2012 Heineken Cup Final, 42-14.

In the 2012–13 campaign, Cave was ever-present as Ulster reached the final of the PRO12 and recorded a series of notable firsts including winning in France and beating every Welsh region in Wales. Cave scored five tries the following season and was a stand-out player for the province as Ulster won all six of their Heineken Cup Pool matches and reached the PRO12 Play Off.

Cave retired from rugby union at the end of the 2018–19 season, having equalled Andrew Trimble's record of 229 appearance for Ulster, a record that has since been surpassed by Rob Herring.

== International career ==
Cave was included in Ireland's 39-man squad for the 2009 Six Nations Championship, was part of the Ireland 'A' team that won the 2009 Churchill Cup, and won his first two full international caps against Canada and the United States in Ireland's 2009 tour of North America. He was selected for Ireland's 2012 tour of New Zealand, making one appearance off the bench, and scored an impressive individual try for an Ireland XV side that defeated Fiji 53-0 later the same year. He was selected for Ireland's 2013 tour of the USA and Canada starting both tests and scoring a try against Canada. He started both tests in Ireland's 2014 tour of Argentina, and won his eighth international cap in the 49-7 win against Georgia in November 2014, having been initially left out of Ireland's squad for the Autumn internationals. He made one appearance in the 2015 Rugby World Cup, starting against Romania. He retired with eleven caps for Ireland.
