= T. J. Anderson (rugby union) =

Irish rugby union player

Thomas "T. J." Anderson
- Born: 3 March 1987 (age 39) Derry, Northern Ireland
- Height: 1.93 m (6 ft 4 in)
- Weight: 107 kg (16 st 12 lb; 236 lb)
- Notable relative(s): Willie Anderson (father); Jonathan Anderson (brother)

Rugby union career
- Position: Flanker
Amateur team(s)
Years	Team	Apps	(Points)
- Dungannon
Senior career
Years	Team	Apps	(Points)
2007–2011	Ulster	20	(5)
2011–2013	Connacht	10	(0)
2013–2014	Ealing Trailfinders	17	(5)
- Correct as of 4 April 2022

Thomas "T. J." Anderson (born 3 March 1987) is an Irish former rugby union player who played flanker for Ulster, Connacht, and Ealing Trailfinders.

The son of former Ireland rugby international Willie Anderson, he played Gaelic football for St. Patrick's GAC Loup and rugby for the Ireland national under-20 rugby union team, winning an under-20 Grand Slam in 2007. He played his club rugby for Dungannon, where he was spotted by Ulster coach Matt Williams, and joined the Ulster academy ahead of the 2007–2008 season. He was soon training with the senior squad, and put his law degree on hold to sign a development contract ahead of the 2008–09 season.

Having captained the Ulster Ravens in the British and Irish Cup and made 18 appearances for the senior team in the Celtic League, he signed for Connacht ahead of the 2011–12 season. After playing for Connacht for two seasons, he joined Ealing Trailfinders ahead of the 2013–14 season, and was named the team's vice-captain. He played there for one season before injuries forced him to retire. He went on to become Operations Director at JW Anderson, the fashion label run by his brother Jonathan.
