= Timoci Nagusa =

Fijian rugby union footballer (born 1987)

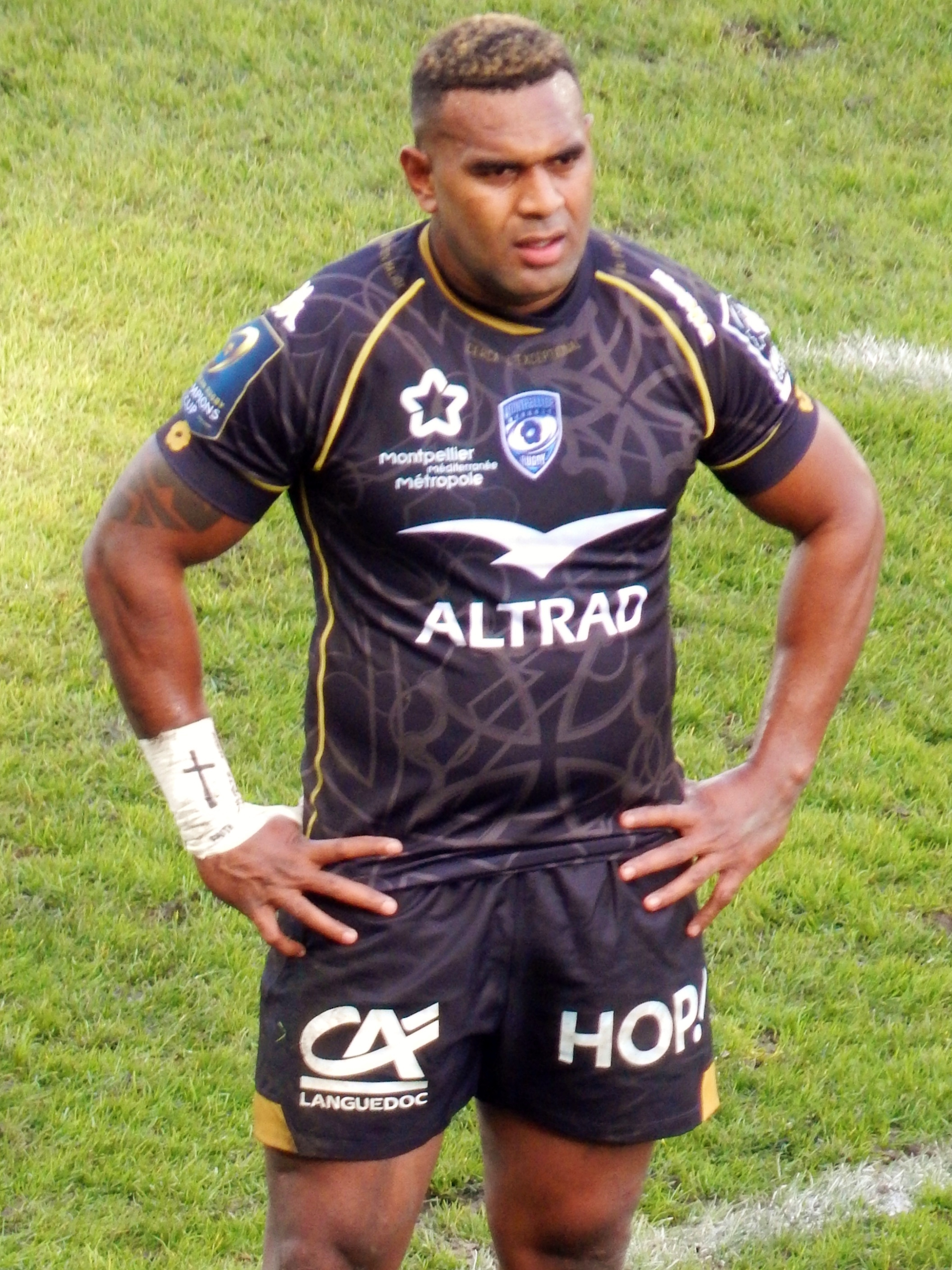
- Full name: Timoci Nagusa
- Born: 14 July 1987 (age 39) Nadi, Fiji
- Height: 1.88 m (6 ft 2 in)
- Weight: 100 kg (15 st 10 lb; 220 lb)

Rugby union career
- Position: Fullback / Wing/ Centre
Senior career
Years	Team	Apps	(Points)
2008-10	Ulster	30	(40)
2010-20	Montpellier	203	(467)
2020	FC Grenoble		
International career
Years	Team	Apps	(Points)
2008-19	Fiji	35	(80)
- Correct as of 27 February 2020

Timoci Nagusa (born 14 July 1987) is a Fijian rugby union footballer. He plays as a wing. He played his rugby for French club, Montpelier for 10 years before leaving for ProD2 club Grenoble in 2020. He is 1.88m (6'2) and weighs 88 kg. He worked as a Police constable in Fiji before his rugby career took off.

== Bio ==
In 2010, he left Ulster Rugby and joined French Top 14 side, Montpelier for their 2010–2011 season; in 2015, he signed a contract extension to the club until 2018.

== Honours ==
- 2015–16 European Rugby Challenge Cup : winner.

== See also ==
- Fiji Rugby Union on Wikipedia
