= Niall O'Connor =

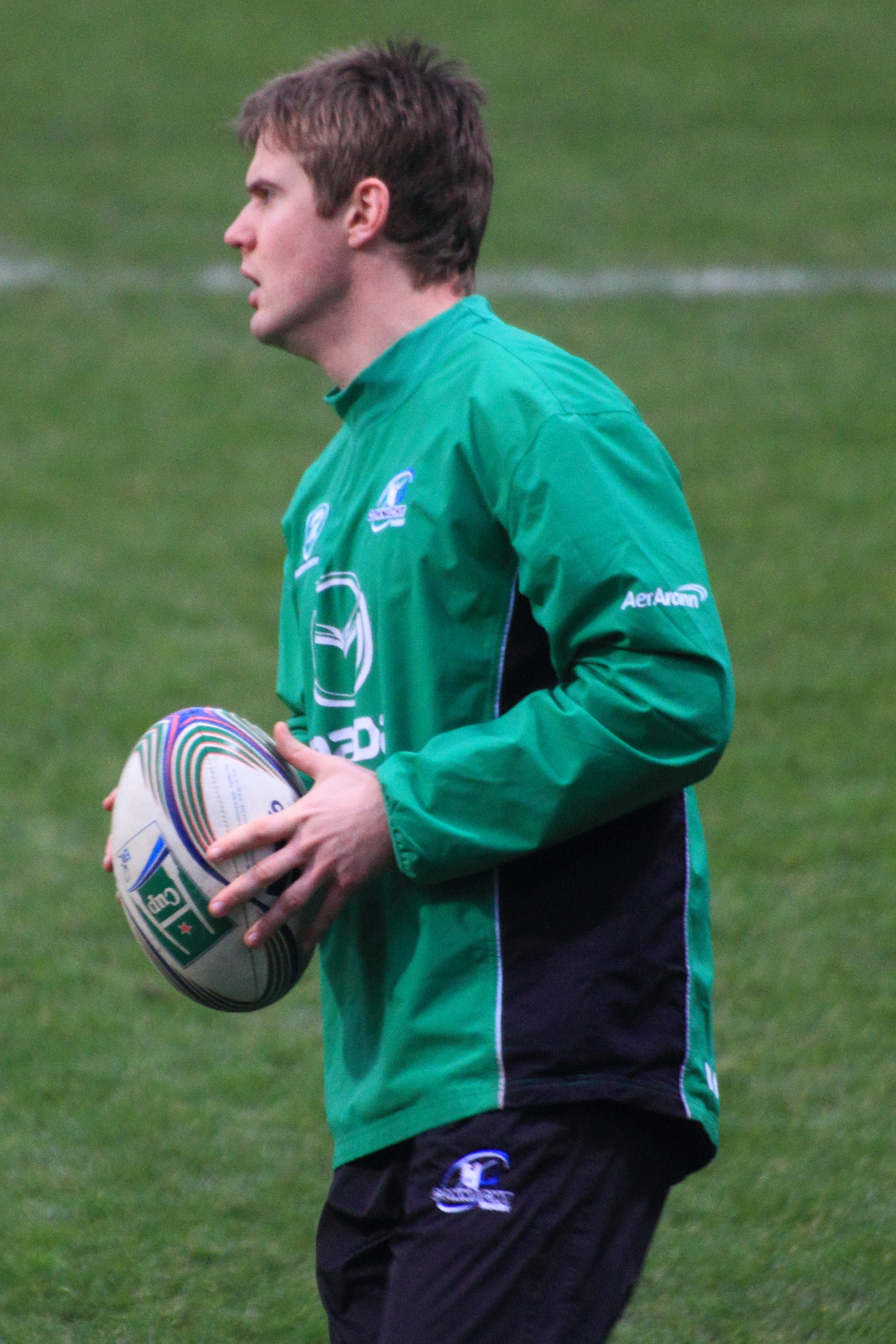
- Born: Niall O'Connor; 7 July 1987 (age 39) Limavady, Northern Ireland
- Height: 1.83 m (6 ft 0 in)
- Weight: 85 kg (13 st 5 lb)
- School: Limavady Grammar School

Rugby union career
- Position: Fly-half
Amateur team(s)
| Years | Team | Apps | (Points) |
- Belfast Harlequins
Senior career
| Years | Team | Apps | (Points) |
| 2007–2011 | Ulster | 51 | (212) |
| 2011–2012 | Connacht | 20 | (116) |
| 2012–2013 | Ulster | 8 | (45) |
| 2013–2014 | Jersey | 12 | (116) |
- Correct as of 30 January 2014
International career
| Years | Team | Apps | (Points) |
| 2007 | Ireland U20 | 2 | (2) |
| 2008–2011 | Ireland Wolfhounds | 6 | (16) |
- Correct as of 28 January 2011

Niall O'Connor (born 7 July 1987) is a former rugby union player. O'Connor's playing position is at Fly-half.

== Early years ==
O'Connor was born on 7 July 1987 and was educated at Limavady Grammar School in the town of his birth. He went to University before he joined the Ulster Academy and began his Rugby career.

== Career ==
O'Connor has played for Ulster and Connacht.

=== Ulster 2007-2011 ===
O'Connor was selected as a young kid to come and play for Ulster. He spent one year in the Ulster Academy before signing a professional contract with the senior team in 2007. His overall statistic of his time at Ulster was that he had played 51 times and scored 212 points. He made his debut for Ulster aged 21 against the Ospreys which Ulster won 17-16. O'Connor also kicked four penalties in that match. He played 16 times in 2007-08 and was a regular starter to the team. In the 2008-09 season he played 17 times scoring 30 points. In 2009-10 he played 12 games and scored 64 points. In 2010-11 He scored 59 points in only 6 games. He then after finishing the 2010-11 season O'Connor signed for Connacht on a two-year deal.

=== Belfast Harlequins ===
O'Connor played for Belfast Harlequins in Ulster his home Province. The Belfast team came second in the 2011-12 season winning 12 of their 18 games.

=== Connacht ===
O'Connor joined Connacht on a 2-year deal. he has scored 86 points in the league for the western province. O'Connor has played 15 times in the pro 12 league for Connacht scoring 1 try, 9 conversions, 1 drop goal and 20 penalties. He has played 753 minutes in the pro 12 for Connacht.

=== Return to Ulster ===
It was confirmed in June 2012 that O'Connor would rejoin Ulster.

=== Jersey ===
O'Connor joined Jersey for the 2013/14 season. His goal kicking prowess was clear from the get go and helped Jersey stay up in the Greene King IPA Championship (RFU Championship) with his boot. He left at the end of the season.

== International ==
O'Connor was called into the Ireland A side that was defeated by England Saxons on 1 February 2008.
