= Paul Warwick (rugby union) =

Australian rugby union player

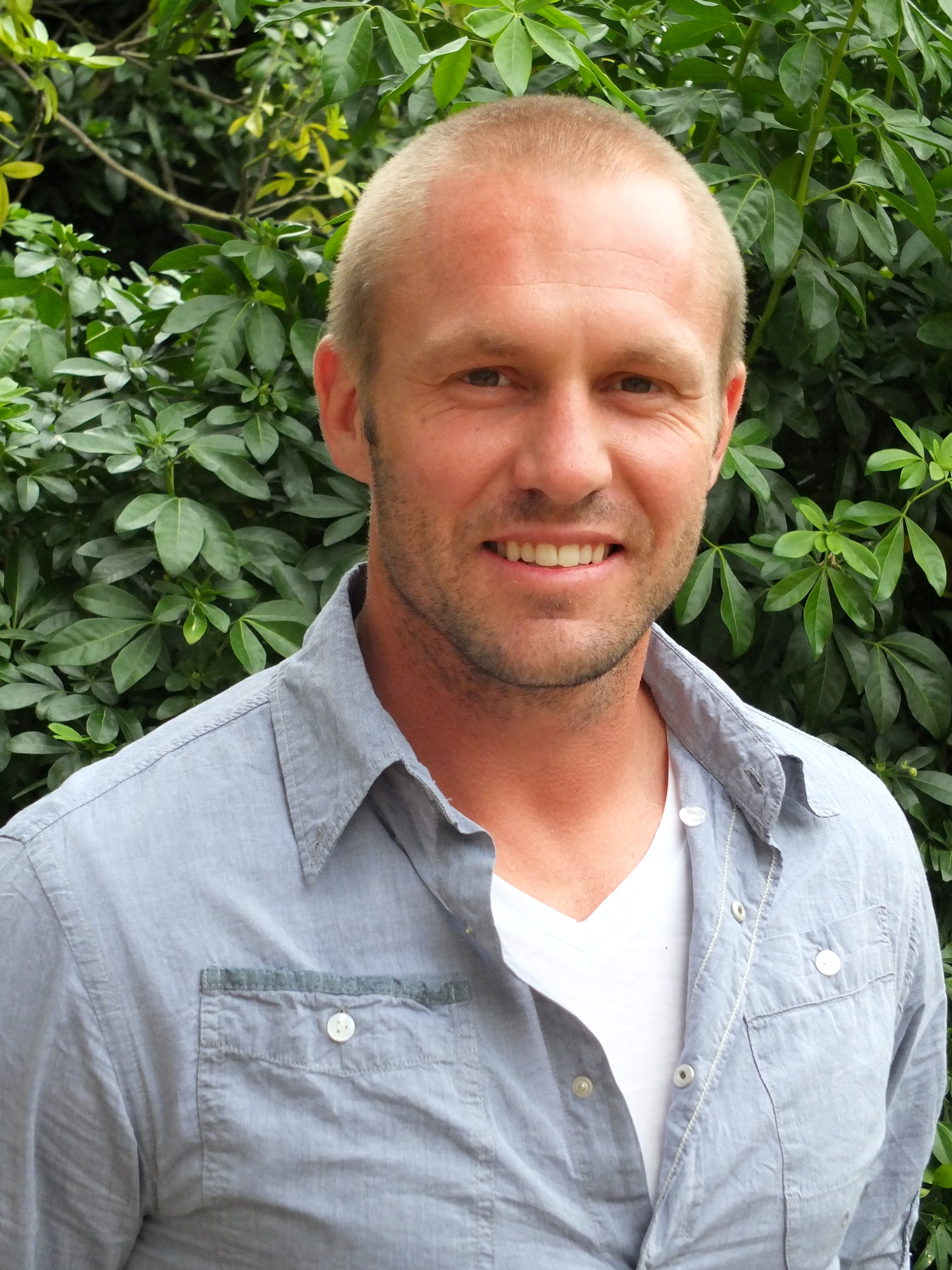
- Born: 8 January 1981 (age 45) Brisbane, Australia
- Height: 1.78 m (5 ft 10 in)
- Weight: 190 lb (86 kg)

Rugby union career
- Position(s): Fullback, Fly-Half, Centre
Senior career
Years	Team	Apps	(Points)
1998–2004	Manly		
2004–07	Connacht	72	(452)
2007–11	Munster	95	(461)
2011–13	Stade Français	49	(40)
2013–14	Worcester Warriors	20	(33)
- Correct as of 16 Feb 2014
International career
Years	Team	Apps	(Points)
2010	Barbarians	2	(0)
National sevens team
Years	Team		Comps
2001-2004	Australia		WS

Paul Warwick (born 8 January 1981 in Australia) is a former Australian rugby union player. He played at fly-half, fullback or centre.

== Connacht ==
Warwick joined Irish province Connacht from Manly in 2004 on a one-year contract. A 97-point return in the 2004–05 European Challenge Cup saw Warwick awarded with a two-year extension on his contract. In a total of 19 appearances in the Challenge Cup, he scored 157 points.

== Munster ==
Warwick joined Munster in 2007, straight from Connacht. He scored 21-point on his full debut for Munster against Llanelli Scarlets on 22 September 2007. He was on the bench for Munster for the 2008 Heineken Cup Final against Toulouse, but did not come on. In April 2009, Warwick scored two monster drop-goals and a try in Munster's 2008–09 Heineken Cup quarter-final against Ospreys, a game in which he won the Man-of-the-Match award. On 27 January 2009, he reportedly signed a three-year deal with Aviva Premiership club London Irish, starting at the start of the 2009–10 Guinness Premiership season. However, there was speculation as to whether he would be joining London Irish or remaining with Munster for the start of the next season, and a Tug-of-War started between the two sides looking to secure his services. On 9 April 2009, Munster and London Irish announced that the issue over Warwick has been resolved to the satisfaction of all parties and that Warwick would be remaining with Munster for 2010–11. He was part of the Munster team that won the 2008–09 Magners League. Warwick scored all of Munster's points during their historic 15–6 win over Australia in November 2010, kicking 3 penalties and 2 drop goals. On 20 December 2010, Munster confirmed that Warwick would leave at the end of the 2010–11 season. He attracted the interest of several European clubs, who offered terms that Munster could not match. Warwick's last appearance for Munster was when he came off the bench during the 2011 Celtic League Grand Final. Munster won the match, against newly crowned Heineken Cup champions and fierce rivals Leinster, 19–9 in Thomond Park.

As Warwick has played Rugby sevens with the Australia Sevens, he will never be eligible to play for Ireland, despite the fact that he would now qualify through marriage and residency.

== Stade Français ==
He joined Stade Français in 2011 on a two-year contract.

== Worcester Warriors ==
It was announced on 25 January 2013 that Warwick will join Aviva Premiership side Worcester Warriors at the beginning of the 2013–14 season. He made his debut for the club on 5 October 2013, coming off the bench against Newcastle Falcons.

== Retirement ==
On 19 May 2014, Warwick was forced to retire from rugby due to severe neck problems. On 20 August 2014, Warwick stayed with Worcester Warriors as part of their backroom coaching staff.

== Honours ==
=== Munster ===
- Heineken Cup:
  - Winner (1): 2007–08
- Celtic League:
  - Winner (2): 2008–09, 2010–11
