= Tim Barker (rugby union) =

Irish rugby union footballer

- Born: Tim Barker; 19 June 1981 (age 45)
- Height: 1.96 m (6 ft 5 in)
- Weight: 114 kg (18.0 st)

Rugby union career
- Position: Lock
Amateur team(s)
Years	Team	Apps	(Points)
- Dungannon
–	Rainey Old Boys		
Senior career
Years	Team	Apps	(Points)
2003-05	Ulster	0	(0)
2005-06	Glasgow Warriors	15	(0)
2006-07	Ulster	8	(0)
2007-2008	Castres Olympique	16	(0)
2008-2010	Glasgow Warriors	34	(0)
2010-12	Ulster	34	(0)
- Correct as of 29 March 2022

Tim Barker (born 19 June 1981) is an Irish former rugby union player, who played in the second row for Ulster, Glasgow Warriors and Castres Olympique.

He started out at playing club rugby at Dungannon and represented Ireland at under-age levels up to under-21, before signing his first professional contract with Ulster in 2003. He moved to Glasgow Warriors in 2005, where he played for one season before returning to Ulster in 2006, then signing for Castres in 2007. He returned for a second stint at Glasgow in 2008, before signing for third time for Ulster in 2010. He retired from professional rugby in 2012, starting a new career as a chartered accountant and playing club rugby for Rainey Old Boys in the All-Ireland League until 2019.
