= Ricky Andrew =

Irish rugby union player

- Born: Ricky Andrew; 2 December 1989 (age 36) Ballymena, Northern Ireland
- Height: 1.83 m (6 ft 0 in)
- Weight: 80 kg (12 st 8 lb)
- School: Ballymena Academy
- Notable relative: John Andrew (brother)

Rugby union career
- Position: Fullback
Amateur team(s)
Years	Team	Apps	(Points)
- Ballymena
Senior career
Years	Team	Apps	(Points)
2011–2015	Ulster	21	(5)
2015–2016	Nottingham	13	(10)
- Correct as of 23 April 2016

Ricky Andrew (born 2 December 1989) is a rugby union coach and former player. He played professionally at wing and Fullback for Ulster and Nottingham, was player/head coach for Spanish side CAU Rugby Valencia, and is currently a pathway coach with the Ulster academy.

A graduate of the Hughes Insurance Ulster Academy, he made his debut for Ulster in the 2011/12 season. Over the next three seasons he appeared in the Pro12 and Heineken Cup, before moving to Nottingham in the English Championship for the 2015-16 season. After that he spent some time playing and coaching for Rainey Old Boys in the All-Ireland League, before being appointed head coach at CAU Rugby Valencia in 2017. As of 2022 he is a pathway coach with the Ulster Rugby academy.
