= Cillian Willis =

- Born: Cillian Willis; 19 January 1985 (age 41) Dublin, Ireland
- Height: 1.77 m (5 ft 9 1/2 in)
- Weight: 82 kg (12 st 13 lb)
- School: Blackrock College
- University: University College Dublin

Rugby union career
- Position: Scrum-half
Amateur team(s)
Years	Team	Apps	(Points)
- UCD
–	Greystones		
Senior career
Years	Team	Apps	(Points)
2006–2008	Leinster	12	(0)
2008–2010	Ulster	15	(0)
2010–2011	Connacht	18	(0)
2011	Leinster	6	(0)
2011–2013	Sale Sharks	30	(10)
- Correct as of 31 May 2013

Cillian Willis (born 19 January 1985) is a former professional rugby union footballer. His primary position was scrum-half.

He was born in Dublin and educated at Blackrock College in Williamstown and University College Dublin, where in 2006 he completed a commerce degree with honours.

Willis broke through into the Leinster team due to injuries to Chris Whittaker and Guy Easterby early on in the 2006/2007 season. His performances earned him the Leinster Player of the Month Award for October/November. Willis is also cousin to Brian O'Driscoll. In July 2010, Willis signed a new contract with Connacht Rugby and joined his new squad on their pre-season training trip on the Aran Islands. He left Connacht after one season and with Eoin Reddan and Isaac Boss both called into the Irish World Cup squad he was given a contract until October 2011 by Leinster. Willis signed for Sale Sharks for the 2011/2012 season.
