= James Sandford (rugby union) =

Irish rugby union player

- Born: 27 January 1989 (age 37) Richhill, County Armagh, Northern Ireland
- Height: 2.00 m (6 ft 6 1/2 in)
- Weight: 116 kg (256 lb; 18.3 st)

Rugby union career
- Position: Lock
Senior career
Years	Team	Apps	(Points)
	Ulster	0	(0)
2010–11	Rotherham Titans	16	(25)
2011–13	London Irish	12	(0)
2013–14	Cornish Pirates	7	(5)
2014–	London Welsh	0	(0)
International career
Years	Team	Apps	(Points)
2008–09	Ireland u20	13	(5)

James Sandford (born 27 January 1989) is a former rugby union player with Aviva Premiership side London Welsh. Born in Richhill, County Armagh Northern Ireland, Sandford attended The Royal School, Armagh. Having captained the Ulster Schools and Irish schools in his second year in those squads he was named Northern Bank Schools player of the year and subsequently joined the Ulster Academy. In 2009 he was awarded National Young Player of the Year by the Irish Examiner. On leaving school he represented Ulster U20's captaining the side and Irish U20's where he was involved in two Under 20's Six Nations campaigns and one IRB Junior World Championship.

In 2010 Sandford left Ulster to join English, RFU Championship side Rotherham Titans. After a season under Andre Besters he made the move to London Irish on a one-year deal for season 2011–12. After making an impression in the Premiership he put pen to paper and signed a contract until the end of the 2013–14 season. He signed for the Cornish Pirates in May, 2013. On 12 July 2014, Sandford signed for London Welsh who compete in the Aviva Premiership ahead of the 2014–15 season.
