= Mark McCrea =

Irish rugby union player

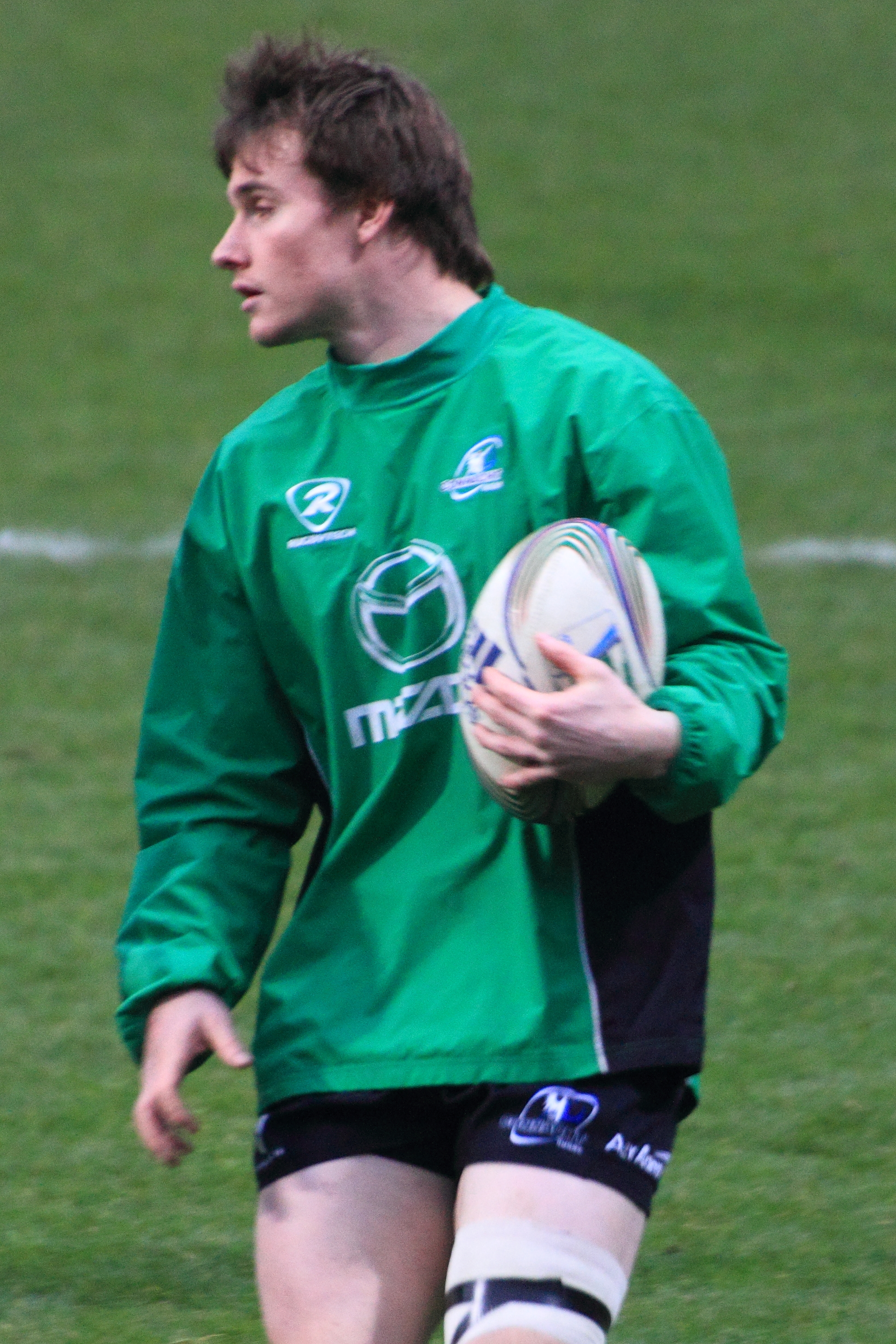
- Born: Mark McCrea; September 7, 1987 (age 39) Belfast, Northern Ireland
- Height: 1.85 m (6 ft 1 in)
- Weight: 14 st 5 lb (92 kg)
- School: Belfast High School

Rugby union career
- Position: Wing
- Current team: Jersey
Senior career
Years	Team	Apps	(Points)
2007–2011	Ulster	22	(10)
2011–2013	Connacht		
2013–	Jersey Reds		
International career
Years	Team	Apps	(Points)
2008-09	Ireland A	3	(5)

Mark McCrea (born 7 September 1987) is a rugby union player for Connacht in the Pro14 competition. He plays Normally on the wing but can play in the centre.

Born in Belfast, Northern Ireland, McCrea signed a year and a half professional contract in January 2008 which will keep him at Ravenhill until June 2009. McCrea had been part of the Ulster Rugby Academy for just over a year when he began training with the senior Ulster team.

In December 2008 it was announced that McCrea had signed a contract extension until 2011.

== Connacht ==
McCrea signed for Connacht for the 2011–2012 season on a 2-year contract. He made his debut for Connacht Rugby against Benetton Treviso and scored his first Connacht try against Scarlets in 13-11 win in the Sportsground in Sept 2011. He made 9 PRO12 appearances for Connacht Rugby and scored two tries, the second away to Glasgow Warriors in Sept 2012.

== Ireland U19 ==
McCrea has played for Ireland at under 19 level and has played in a churchill cup. He has been called up to the Ireland Wolfhounds squad before.

== Jersey ==
In February 2013, it was announced that McCrea would join Jersey for the rest of the season and the next year.
