= Ian Humphreys =

Irish rugby union player (born 1982)

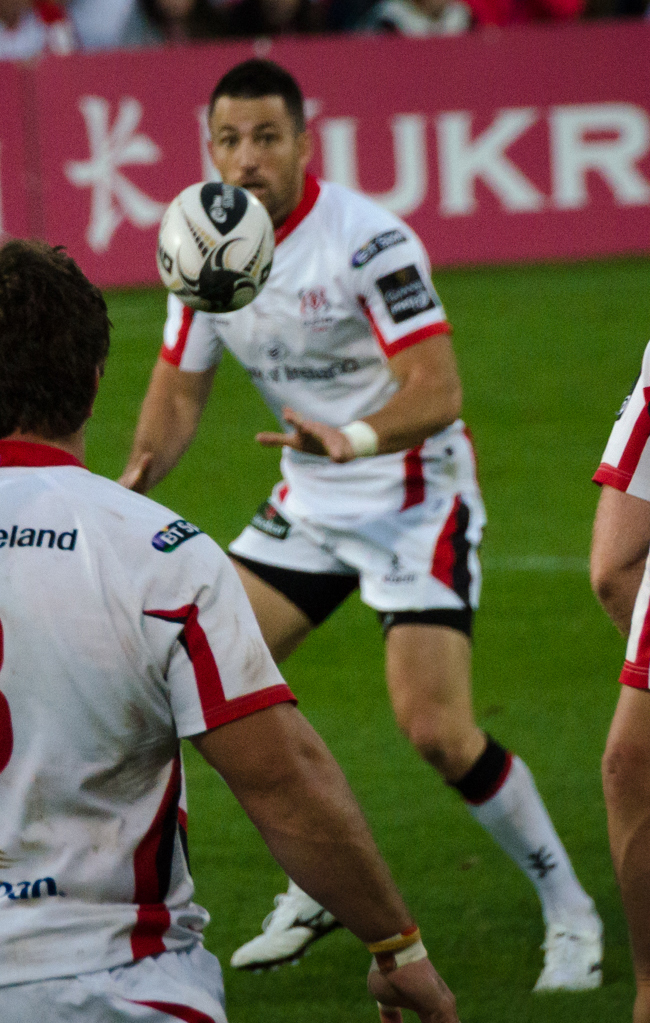
- Ian Humphreys playing for Ulster, 2014
- Born: 24 April 1982 (age 44) Belfast, Northern Ireland
- Height: 1.80 m (5 ft 11 in)
- Weight: 83 kg (13 st 1 lb)
- Notable relative: David Humphreys (brother)

Rugby union career
- Position: Fly-half
- Current team: Ulster Rugby
Senior career
Years	Team	Apps	(Points)
2005–08	Leicester Tigers	27	(175)
2008–12	Ulster	83	(617)
2012–14	London Irish	33	(198)
2014–16	Ulster	30	(126)
- Correct as of 6 April 2021
International career
Years	Team	Apps	(Points)
2007–11	Ireland Wolfhounds	7	(44)
- Correct as of 1 April 2021
National sevens team
Years	Team		Comps
2005	Ireland		3

Ian Humphreys (born 24 April 1982 in Belfast, Northern Ireland) is a retired Irish rugby union footballer, who played at fly-half for the Pro12 team Ulster Rugby and English sides Leicester Tigers and London Irish. He joined Ulster in 2008 from Leicester Tigers having previously played for Ulster at under 21 level where he captained them during the 2002/03 season and has also represented Ireland at U19, U21 and 'A' level, and captained the Irish side at the Rugby World Cup Sevens tournament in Hong Kong in March 2005. He had previously been named player of the tournament for the European Sevens qualifier in Poland.

He is the younger brother of retired Ulster fly-half David Humphreys.

Humphreys joined Leicester Tigers in 2005 from Belfast Harlequins. His first outing in Tigers stripes was at the Middlesex Sevens Tournament at Twickenham in August. During October 2006 Humphreys was loaned out to first division Leeds where he made 4 appearances, scoring 2 tries and a drop goal. On his return to the Leicester first team he guided the Tigers to a victory away at Wasps with a mature display. After more assured performances, and a hamstring injury to Andy Goode, Humphreys was selected to play Munster at Thomond Park in a decisive Heineken Cup pool game. After his brilliant performance in a high tempo match he was the selected for his Ireland A début against England Saxons at Ravenhill, in his native Ulster.

In April 2008, after falling out of favour at Leicester, Humphreys signed for Ulster to replace his retiring brother. He joined London Irish in 2012 scoring 198 points in 33 games. He rejoined Ulster at the start of the 2014/15 season but retired at the end of the 2015/16 season.
