= Niall Malone =

Irish rugby union player

- Born: Niall Gareth Malone; 30 April 1971 (age 55) Leeds, England

Rugby union career
- Position(s): Fullback, centre, fly-half
Senior career
Years	Team	Apps	(Points)
–	Leicester		
–	Worcester		
–	Ulster		
International career
Years	Team	Apps	(Points)
1993-1994	Ireland	3	(9)

Niall Gareth Malone (born 30 April 1971 in Leeds, England) was a former rugby union player who played out-half for Leicester, Worcester, Ulster and Ireland. Afterward, having worked as an elite player development officer with Ulster's academy and as a skills coach for Ulster's senior team, he has been Ulster's head video analyst since 2018.

Educated at Methodist College Belfast and Loughborough University, he played for Leicester for six seasons, and won three caps for Ireland. After a spell with Worcester, he signed a contract with Ulster ahead of the 1999–2000 season. He played three seasons with Ulster before being released in 2002, after which he was appointed Director of Rugby at Bangor Rugby Club. He moved to Instonians as a player-coach in 2005. He worked as a schoolteacher at Royal Belfast Academical Institution, also coaching their rugby team. He was appointed as an elite player development officer with Ulster's academy in 2008. He signed a contract extension as an analyst and skills coach in 2014, and became head video analyst in 2018.
