= Matt Jones (rugby union) =

Matthew Jones
- Born: Matthew Jones; 4 April 1984 (age 42) Bridgend, Wales
- Height: 5 ft 8 in (1.73 m)
- Weight: 12 st 12 lb (82 kg)

Rugby union career
- Position: Fly-half
- Current team: Pontypool RFC
Senior career
| Years | Team | Apps | (Points) |
| 2004–07 | Ospreys | 47 | (47) |
| 2007 | Moseley | 11 | (75) |
| 2007–08 | London Welsh | | |
| 2008–10 | Worcester | 31 | (122) |
| 2010–12 | Newport GD | 33 | (160) |
| 2012-2013 | Bristol | 0 | (0) |
| 2013-2016 | Coventry | | |
| 2016- | Pontypool | | |
International career
| Years | Team | Apps | (Points) |
| 2005 | Wales | 1 | (0) |

Matthew Jones (born 4 April 1984) is a Welsh international rugby union player. A fly-half, he played for the Ospreys and the Wales Under-21 team, figuring in the Grand Slam winning side. In 2005 he was part of the senior Wales squad summer tour of North America and attained his first full cap against Canada.

On 23 April 2013 Bristol Confirmed that Matthew Jones as well as others players would be released at the end of the 2012–13 season.

Jones suffered a knee injury in August 2006. After a brief spell at Moseley he moved to London Welsh.

He joined Worcester Warriors in July 2008. In May 2010 Jones joined Newport Gwent Dragons. In January 2012, Jones joined Bristol, and then in 2013 he moved to Coventry R.F.C. Jones returned to Wales in 2016 becoming a player-coach for Pontypool RFC.
