= Nevin Spence =

Irish rugby union player (1990–2012)

- Born: 26 April 1990 Annahilt, Northern Ireland, UK
- Died: 15 September 2012 (aged 22) Hillsborough, Northern Ireland, UK
- Height: 1.83 m (6 ft 0 in)
- Weight: 95 kg (14 st 13 lb)
- School: Wallace High School, Lisburn

Rugby union career
- Position(s): Centre, Wing
Amateur team(s)
| Years | Team | Apps | (Points) |
| -2012 | Ballynahinch | | |
Senior career
| Years | Team | Apps | (Points) |
| 2010–12 | Ulster | 42 | (25) |
- Correct as of 16 September 2012
International career
| Years | Team | Apps | (Points) |
| 2008–10 | Ireland u20 | 11 | (20) |
| 2011–12 | Wolfhounds | 3 | (0) |
- Correct as of 16 September 2012

Nevin John Spence (26 April 1990 – 15 September 2012) was a Northern Irish rugby union player who represented Ulster in the Pro12. A centre who could also play on the wing, he came through the Ulster Rugby Academy and played his club rugby for Ballynahinch. He was also a capable footballer and appeared for Northern Ireland at under‑16 level.

== Early life ==
Nevin John Spence was born on 26 April 1990 in Annahilt, Northern Ireland, to Noel and Essie Spence. He had a brother, Graham, and two sisters, Emma and Laura. He was educated at Dromore High School, where he was introduced to rugby, and later at Wallace High School.

== Club career ==
Spence rose to prominence at Ballynahinch RFC during the successful 2009-10 season, in which the club won the Ulster Senior League Cup, AIL Division 2, and the All-Ireland Cup. He was also a member of the Ulster Rugby Academy.

Spence made his first professional appearance against the Ospreys in April 2010. In a little more than two seasons with Ulster he made 42 appearances, despite a number of shoulder injuries, and scored five tries.

== International career ==
Spence made 11 appearances for the Ireland national under-20 team, scoring four tries, and played twice at the IRB Junior World Championships. After strong performances for Ulster and two appearances for Ireland Wolfhounds, he was called up to Ireland's senior training squad for the 2011 Six Nations Championship. His talent was recognised by his fellow professionals in 2011 when he was named Young Player of the Year at the IRUPA Players' Awards. In May 2012, he played for Ireland against the Barbarians in a non-capped match at Gloucester's Kingsholm Stadium.

== Death ==
Spence died along with his brother Graham and father Noel, in an accident at the family farm in Hillsborough, County Down on 15 September 2012, aged 22, after they were overcome by fumes in a slurry tank. Spence and his father Noel were pronounced dead at the scene, while Graham was declared dead later in hospital. Spence's sister Emma also attempted to help and was overcome by fumes; she was treated in hospital and survived.

Their joint funeral was held at Ballynahinch Baptist Church, followed by their burial at Inch Cemetery on 19 September. A minute's silence was observed at many rugby games in Britain and Ireland the following week, and a memorial service was held at Ravenhill Stadium, the home ground of Ulster Rugby, on 23 September.

=== Inquest ===
The inquest found that the accident began when their collie dog fell into a slurry tank. Graham entered the tank to look for the dog and was overcome by fumes as he climbed the ladder to get out. Spence then climbed down after seeing him collapse and was also overcome, followed by their father Noel, who attempted to assist both men. Noel reached Graham and began to bring him up the ladder, assisted from above by a neighbour, but he lost consciousness during the attempt and the neighbour could not hold Graham without his support. Emma twice entered the tank during rescue attempts. Neighbours helped her lift her father Noel out, and she attempted resuscitation. She then went back and tried to lift her brother Graham out but was overcome by fumes as she climbed the ladder. Both were subsequently taken out of the tank by rescuers. A firefighter later recovered Spence and the dog from the bottom of the tank. The state pathologist said the concentration of hydrogen sulphide and other gases in the tank was sufficient to render the three men unconscious, and that they died after breathing in slurry when they fell into the tank.

=== Legacy ===
In August 2015, the Nevin Spence Centre opened at Ravenhill stadium. In April 2023, Ulster Rugby unveiled the Nevin Spence Memorial Stand.
