= 2015–16 Ulster Rugby season =

Ulster Rugby
- 2015–16 season
- Head Coach: Neil Doak
- Director of Rugby: Les Kiss
- Captain: Rory Best
- Pro12: Semi-final
- European Rugby Champions Cup: 2nd in Pool 1
- Top try scorer: League: Craig Gilroy (10); All: Craig Gilroy (12)
- Top points scorer: League: Paddy Jackson (143); All: Paddy Jackson (200)
Home colours	Away colours

The 2015–16 season was Ulster's 22nd season since the advent of professionalism in rugby union, and the second under Director of Rugby Les Kiss and head coach Neil Doak. They competed in the European Rugby Champions Cup and the Pro12.

In the Pro12, Ulster finished fourth, qualifying for the playoffs and for next season's Champions Cup. They lost to Leinster in the semi-final. Ulster won the Fair Play Award, and wing Craig Gilroy made the Pro12 Dream Team. In the Champions Cup, they finished second in Pool 1, missing out on the knockout stage. Academy wing Jacob Stockdale made his senior debut this season. Centre Stuart McCloskey was Ulster's Player of the Year. Out-half Paddy Jackson was Ulster's leading scorer with 200 points. Craig Gilroy was leading try scorer with ten. Lock Franco van der Merwe was leading tackler with 261. At the end of the season, number eight Nick Williams left for Cardiff Blues, and lock Dan Tuohy for Bristol Bears. Out-half Ian Humphreys retired.

== Staff ==
Position	Name	Nationality
Director of Rugby	Les Kiss	Australia
Head Coach	Neil Doak	Ireland
Team Manager	Bryn Cunningham	Ireland
Forwards Coach	Allen Clarke	Ireland
Coach	Joe Barakat	Australia
Head of Strength & Conditioning	Jonny Davis	Ireland
Strength & Conditioning Coach	Kevin Geary	Ireland
Head of Physiotherapy	Gareth Robinson	Ireland
Physiotherapist	Alan McAldin	Ireland

== Squad ==
=== Senior squad ===
==== Players In ====
- (England) Peter Browne from (England) London Welsh
- (Ireland) Willie Faloon from (Ireland) Connacht
- (Ireland) Stephen Mulholland from (Ireland) Ballymena
- (Ireland) Paul Rowley from (England) London Welsh
- (Ireland) Frank Taggart from (Ireland) Ballymena
- (Australia) Sam Windsor from (England) Worcester Warriors

==== Promoted from academy ====
- (Ireland) John Andrew
- (Ireland) Sammy Arnold
- (Ireland) Paul Jackson
- (Ireland) Alan O'Connor

==== Players Out ====
- (Ireland) Ross Adair to (England) Jersey
- (Ireland) Michael Allen to (Scotland) Edinburgh Rugby
- (Ireland) Ricky Andrew to (England) Nottingham
- (New Zealand) Tim Boys to Southland/Crusaders
- (Ireland) Charlie Butterworth to (England) Jersey
- (Ireland) Declan Fitzpatrick retired
- (Ireland) Michael Heaney to (England) Doncaster Knights
- (Ireland) Mike McComish released
- (Ireland) Neil McComb to (Ireland) Belfast Harlequins
- (Ireland) Dave Ryan to (France) Agen
- (Ireland) James Simpson released
- (Samoa) Michael Stanley to (New Zealand) Counties Manukau

Ulster Rugby squad
**Props**: (Ireland) Ricky Lutton (26 apps, 14 starts); (South Africa) Wiehahn Herbst* (15 apps, 14 starts, 5 pts); (Ireland) Callum Black (22 apps, 13 starts, 5 pts); (Ireland) Kyle McCall (21 apps, 10 starts, 5 pts); (Ireland) Andrew Warwick (17 apps, 6 starts); (New Zealand) Bronson Ross* (10 apps, 1 start); (Ireland) Ruaidhrí Murphy (no apps); **Hookers**: (Ireland) **Rob Herring** (27 apps, 15 starts, 10 pts); (Ireland) **Rory Best** (c) (14 apps, 12 starts, 10 pts); (Ireland) John Andrew (10 apps, 2 starts); (Ireland) Jonny Murphy (6 apps, 1 start); (Ireland) Paul Jackson (1 app); **Locks**: (South Africa) **Franco van der Merwe** (26 apps, 26 starts, 5 pts); (England) Peter Browne* (14 apps, 10 starts, 10 pts); (Ireland) Alan O'Connor (12 apps, 10 starts); (Ireland) **Iain Henderson** (9 apps, 9 starts, 5 pts); (Ireland) **Dan Tuohy** (8 apps, 7 starts, 10 pts); (Ireland) Lewis Stevenson (9 apps, 4 starts, 5 pts)	**Back row**: (Ireland) Sean Reidy (23 apps, 16 starts, 25 pts); (New Zealand) Nick Williams (19 apps, 16 starts, 30 pts); (Ireland) **Robbie Diack** (23 apps, 15 starts, 5 pts); (Ireland) **Roger Wilson** (26 apps, 14 starts); (Ireland) **Chris Henry** (18 apps, 14 starts, 10 pts); (Ireland) Willie Faloon (8 apps, 6 starts, 10 pts); (Ireland) Clive Ross (10 apps, 1 start); (Ireland) Stephen Mulholland (2 apps, 1 start); (Ireland) Conor Joyce (no apps); (Ireland) Frank Taggart (no apps); **Scrum-halves**: (South Africa) **Ruan Pienaar** (21 apps, 18 starts, 19 pts); (Ireland) **Paul Marshall** (28 apps, 11 starts, 22 pts); (Ireland) David Shanahan (5 apps); (Ireland) Paul Rowley (no apps); **Fly-halves**: (Ireland) **Paddy Jackson** (24 apps, 20 starts, 193 pts); (Ireland) Ian Humphreys (9 apps, 4 starts, 34 pts); (Australia) Sam Windsor* (1 app, 1 start)	**Centres**: (Ireland) Stuart McCloskey (23 apps, 21 starts, 39 pts); (Ireland) **Luke Marshall** (21 apps, 20 starts, 22 pts); (Ireland) **Darren Cave** (19 apps, 10 starts, 10 pts); (Ireland) **Stuart Olding** (12 apps, 9 starts, 19 pts); (Ireland) Sammy Arnold (12 apps, 5 starts); (Ireland) **Jared Payne** (7 apps, 7 starts, 25 pts); **Wings**: (Ireland) **Craig Gilroy** (26 apps, 25 starts, 60 pts); (Ireland) **Andrew Trimble** (18 apps, 18 starts, 20 pts); (Ireland) Jacob Stockdale (6 apps, 5 starts); (Ireland) **Tommy Bowe** (1 app, 1 start, 10 pts); (Ireland) Rory Scholes (no apps); **Fullbacks**: (South Africa) Louis Ludik* (15 apps, 12 starts, 5 pts); (Ireland) Peter Nelson (9 apps, 8 starts, 9 pts)
(c) denotes the team captain, **Bold** denotes internationally capped players. Italics denotes academy players who appeared in the senior team.^{*} denotes players qualified to play for Ireland on residency or dual nationality. Players and their allocated positions from the Ulster Rugby website.

=== Academy squad ===
==== Players in ====
- (Ireland) Nick Timoney from (Ireland) Blackrock College
- (Ireland) Ross Kane from (Ireland) Ballymena R.F.C.
- (Ireland) Johnny McPhillips (England) from Newcastle Falcons
- (Ireland) Jake Byrne
- (Ireland) Peter Cooper
- (Ireland) Liam Free
- (Ireland) Andy McGrath

==== Players out ====
- (Ireland) Jonny Murphy
- (Ireland) Joshua Atkinson
- (Ireland) Frank Taggart
- (Ireland) Sean O'Hagan

Position	Name	Nationality
Head Coach	Kieran Campbell	Ireland
Strength & Conditioning Coach	Matthew Maguire	Ireland
Strength & Conditioning Coach	Matthew Godfrey	Ireland
Strength & Conditioning Coach	Amy Davis	Ireland
Representative Team Performance Manager	Michael Black	Ireland
Talent Development Officer	Jonny Gillespie	Ireland
Elite Player Development Officer/Head Coach Ulster 'A'	Alex Codling	Ireland
Elite Player Development Officer	James Topping	Ireland
Lead Strength & Conditioning Coach	David Drake	Ireland

Ulster Rugby Academy squad
**Props**: (Ireland) Jake Byrne **(1)**; (Ireland) Peter Cooper **(1)**; (Ireland) Ross Kane **(1)**; (Ireland) Michael Lagan **(2)**; (Ireland) Craig Trenier **(2)**; **Hookers**: None; **Locks**: (Ireland) John Donnan **(3)**; (Ireland) Alex Thompson **(2)**	**Back row**: (Ireland) Nick Timoney **(1)**; (Ireland) Lorcan Dow **(2)** (1 app); **Scrum-halves**: (Ireland) David Shanahan **(3)**; (Ireland) Liam Free **(1)**; (Ireland) Connor Young **(2)**; **Fly-halves**: (Ireland) Andy McGrath **(1)**; (Ireland) Johnny McPhillips **(1)**	**Centres**: (Ireland) Jacob Stockdale **(1)** (6 apps, 5 starts); (Ireland) Mark Best; **Wings**: (Ireland) Rob Lyttle **(1)**; (Ireland) Jack Owens **(2)**; **Fullbacks**: (Ireland) David Busby **(2)**
(c) denotes the team captain, **Bold** denotes internationally capped players, number in brackets indicates players stage in the three-year academy cycle.^{*} denotes players qualified to play for Ireland on residency or dual nationality. Players and their allocated positions from the Ulster Rugby website.

== Season record ==
Competition	Played	Won	Drawn	Lost	PF	PA	PD	TF	TA
2015-16 Champions Cup	6	4	0	2	169	109	60	21	12
2015-16 Pro12	23	14	0	9	506	337	169	63	32
Total	31	18	0	11	675	446	229	84	44

== European Rugby Champions Cup ==
=== Pool 1 ===
Team	P	W	D	L	PF	PA	Diff	TF	TA	TB	LB	Pts
(England) Saracens (1)	6	6	0	0	220	73	+147	26	8	4	0	28
(Ireland) Ulster	6	4	0	2	169	109	+60	21	12	2	0	18
(France) Oyonnax	6	1	0	5	99	218	–119	10	30	1	2	7
(France) Toulouse	6	1	0	5	85	173	–88	11	18	0	1	5

20 November 2015	Ulster (Ireland)	9–27	(England) Saracens (1 BP)	Ravenhill Stadium, Belfast
19:45	Pen: Jackson (2/2) 15', 25'; Drop: Jackson 20'; Cards: Best (yellow card) 79'	Report	Try: Wyles 29' m Goode 59' c Taylor 64' m B. Vunipola 79' c Con: Farrell (1/3) 60'; Hodgson (1/1) 80'; Pen: Farrell (1/3) 73'; Cards: Rhodes (yellow card) 3'; B. Vunipola (yellow card) 54'	Attendance: 17,209; Referee: Romain Poite (FFR)
Ulster lineup: 1. Callum Black, 2. Rory Best (c), 3. Wiehahn Herbst, 4. Dan Tuohy, 5. Franco van der Merwe, 6. Iain Henderson, 7. Chris Henry, 8. Nick Williams, 9. Ruan Pienaar, 10. Paddy Jackson, 11. Craig Gilroy, 12. Stuart McCloskey, 13. Darren Cave, 14. Andrew Trimble, 15. Louis Ludik.; Replacements: 16. Rob Herring (for Van der Merwe 66'), 17. Kyle McCall (for Black 58'), 18. Ricky Lutton (for Herbst 70'), 19. Robbie Diack (for Williams 66'), 20. Roger Wilson (for Henry 49'), 21. Paul Marshall (for Pienaar 75'), 22. Ian Humphreys (for Jackson 70'), 23. Peter Nelson (for Ludik 73').				Attendance: 17,209; Referee: Romain Poite (FFR)

11 December 2015	(1 BP) Ulster (Ireland)	38–0	(France) Toulouse	Ravenhill Stadium, Belfast
19:45	Try: Williams 22' c Trimble 38' c Marshall 44' c McCloskey 53' c Henry 70' c Con: Jackson (4/4) 23', 39', 45', 53'; Humphreys (1/1) 72'; Pen: Jackson (1/1) 29'; Cards: Williams (yellow card) 35'	Report	Cards: Bézy (yellow card) 27'; Camara (yellow card) 39'	Attendance: 16,016; Referee: Wayne Barnes (RFU)
Ulster lineup: 1. Kyle McCall, 2. Rory Best (c), 3. Wiehahn Herbst, 4. Alan O'Connor, 5. Franco van der Merwe, 6. Robbie Diack, 7. Chris Henry, 8. Nick Williams, 9. Ruan Pienaar, 10. Paddy Jackson, 11. Craig Gilroy, 12. Stuart McCloskey, 13. Luke Marshall, 14. Andrew Trimble, 15. Louis Ludik.; Replacements: 16. Rob Herring (for Best 56'), 17. Andrew Warwick (for McCall 58'), 18. Ricky Lutton (for Herbst 63'), 19. Clive Ross (for Van der Merwe 71'), 20. Roger Wilson (for Williams 52'), 21. Paul Marshall (for Pienaar 63'), 22. Ian Humphreys (for Jackson 63'), 23. Rory Scholes (for Trimble 78').				Attendance: 16,016; Referee: Wayne Barnes (RFU)

20 December 2015	(1 BP) Toulouse (France)	23–25	(Ireland) Ulster	Stade Ernest-Wallon, Toulouse
14:00	Try: Fickou 50' c Picamoles 78' c Con: Bézy (1/1) 51'; Doussain (1/1) 79'; Pen: Bézy (3/3) 36', 42', 55'	Report	Try: Pienaar 31' c Trimble 45' m Marshall 74' c Con: Jackson (2/3) 32', 75'; Pen: Jackson (2/3) 2', 59'	Attendance: 13,852; Referee: JP Doyle (RFU)
Ulster lineup: 1. Kyle McCall, 2. Rory Best (c), 3. Wiehahn Herbst, 4. Alan O'Connor, 5. Franco van der Merwe, 6. Robbie Diack, 7. Sean Reidy, 8. Roger Wilson, 9. Ruan Pienaar, 10. Paddy Jackson, 11. Craig Gilroy, 12. Stuart McCloskey, 13. Luke Marshall, 14. Andrew Trimble, 15. Louis Ludik.; Replacements: 16. Rob Herring (for Wilson 62'), 17. Andrew Warwick (for McCall 52'), 18. Ricky Lutton (for Herbst 44'), 19. Lewis Stevenson (for O'Connor 76'), 20. Nick Williams (for Reidy 43'), 21. Paul Marshall (for Pienaar 77'), 22. Ian Humphreys, 23. Rory Scholes (for Gilroy 12').				Attendance: 13,852; Referee: JP Doyle (RFU)

10 January 2016	(1 BP) Oyonnax (France)	23–24	(Ireland) Ulster	Stade Charles-Mathon, Oyonnax
14:00	Try: Maurouard 7' c Tawalo 38' c Con: Robinson (2/2) 8', 39'; Pen: Robinson (3/3) 14', 28', 33'	Report	Try: Scholes 43' c Gilroy 61' c McCall 67' c Con: Jackson (3/3) 44', 62', 68'; Pen: Jackson (1/1) 77'	Attendance: 7,500; Referee: Luke Pearce (RFU)
Ulster lineup: 1. Kyle McCall, 2. Rory Best (c), 3. Ricky Lutton, 4. Lewis Stevenson, 5. Franco van der Merwe, 6. Robbie Diack, 7. Chris Henry, 8. Roger Wilson, 9. Paul Marshall, 10. Ian Humphreys, 11. Rory Scholes, 12. Stuart McCloskey, 13. Luke Marshall, 14. Sammy Arnold, 15. Craig Gilroy.; Replacements: 16. Rob Herring (for Best 75'), 17. Callum Black (for McCall 20'), 18. Bronson Ross (for Lutton 78'), 19. Nick Williams (for Stevenson 41'), 20. Sean Reidy (for L. Marshall 75'), 21. Ruan Pienaar (for P. Marshall 41'), 22. Paddy Jackson (for Humphreys 41'), 23. Louis Ludik (for Arnold 23').				Attendance: 7,500; Referee: Luke Pearce (RFU)

16 January 2016	(1 BP) Saracens (England)	33–17	(Ireland) Ulster	Allianz Park, London
15:15	Try: Vunipola 37' c Taylor 52' m Itoje 58' m Brits 62' m Con: Farrell (2/4) 38', 63'; Pen: Farrell (3/5) 2', 20', 48'	Report	Try: Marshall 4' c Humphreys 70' c Con: Jackson (1/1) 5'; Humphreys (1/1) 70'; Pen: Jackson (1/2) 44'; Cards: Jackson (yellow card) 35'	Attendance: 9,642; Referee: Jérôme Garcès (FFR)
Ulster lineup: 1. Kyle McCall, 2. Rory Best (c), 3. Wiehahn Herbst, 4. Alan O'Connor, 5. Franco van der Merwe, 6. Robbie Diack, 7. Sean Reidy, 8. Roger Wilson, 9. Ruan Pienaar, 10. Paddy Jackson, 11. Craig Gilroy, 12. Stuart McCloskey, 13. Luke Marshall, 14. Andrew Trimble, 15. Jared Payne.; Replacements: 16. Rob Herring (for Best 61'), 17. Callum Black (for McCall 74'), 18. Ricky Lutton (for Herbst 36'), 19. Lewis Stevenson (for O'Connor 74'), 20. Clive Ross (for Van der Merwe 68'), 21. Paul Marshall (for Pienaar 74'), 22. Ian Humphreys (for Jackson 63'), 23. Rory Scholes (for Payne 71').				Attendance: 9,642; Referee: Jérôme Garcès (FFR)

23 January 2016	(1 BP) Ulster (Ireland)	56–3	(France) Oyonnax	Ravenhill Stadium, Belfast
13:00	Try: Herring 1' c Cave 17' c Scholes 26' c Reidy 38' c Gilroy 47' c Diack 54' c Humphreys 58' c Payne 60' c Con: Jackson (5/5) 2', 18', 27', 39', 48'; Humphreys (3/3) 55', 58', 61'	Report	Pen: Clegg (1/2) 9'	Attendance: 15,108; Referee: Marius Mitrea (FIR)
Ulster lineup: 1. Kyle McCall, 2. Rob Herring (c), 3. Ricky Lutton, 4. Alan O'Connor, 5. Franco van der Merwe, 6. Robbie Diack, 7. Sean Reidy, 8. Nick Williams, 9. Paul Marshall, 10. Paddy Jackson, 11. Craig Gilroy, 12. Luke Marshall, 13. Darren Cave, 14. Andrew Trimble, 15. Jared Payne.; Replacements: 16. Rory Best (for Herring 73'), 17. Callum Black, 18. Bronson Ross (for Williams 59'), 19. Clive Ross, 20. Roger Wilson (for Van der Merwe 51'), 21. David Shanahan (for P. Marshall 67'), 22. Ian Humphreys (for Jackson 51'), 23. Rory Scholes (for Cave 62').				Attendance: 15,108; Referee: Marius Mitrea (FIR)

== Pro12 ==
2015–16 Pro12
	Team	Played	Won	Drawn	Lost	Points For	Points Against	Points Diff	Tries For	Tries Against	Try Bonus	Losing Bonus	Points
1	(Ireland) Leinster (RU)	22	16	0	6	458	290	+168	51	27	6	3	73
2	(Ireland) Connacht (CH)	22	15	0	7	507	406	+101	60	46	8	5	73
3	(Scotland) Glasgow Warriors (SF)	22	14	1	7	557	380	+177	68	37	8	6	72
4	(Ireland) Ulster (SF)	22	14	0	8	488	307	+181	61	29	8	5	69
5	(Wales) Scarlets	22	14	0	8	477	458	+19	45	54	2	5	63
6	(Ireland) Munster	22	13	0	9	459	417	+42	56	36	6	5	63
7	(Wales) Cardiff Blues	22	11	0	11	542	461	+81	62	53	5	7	56
8	(Wales) Ospreys	22	11	1	10	490	455	+35	55	49	6	3	55
9	(Scotland) Edinburgh	22	11	0	11	405	366	+39	41	36	2	8	54
10	(Wales) Newport Gwent Dragons	22	4	0	18	353	492	−139	33	57	0	10	26
11	(Italy) Zebre	22	5	0	17	308	718	−410	35	99	3	1	24
12	(Italy) Benetton Treviso	22	3	0	19	320	614	−294	35	79	0	8	20
If teams are level at any stage, tiebreakers are applied in the following order: 1. number of matches won; 2. the difference between points for and points against; 3. the number of tries scored; 4. the most points scored; 5. the difference between tries for and tries against; 6. the fewest red cards received; 7. the fewest yellow cards received.
Green background (rows 1 to 4) were play-off places, and earned places in the 2016–17 European Rugby Champions Cup. Blue background indicates teams outside the play-off places that earned places in the European Rugby Champions Cup. To facilitate the 2015 Rugby World Cup, there were no play-offs for the 2016–17 European Rugby Champions Cup; the 20th place went to the winner of the 2015–16 European Rugby Challenge Cup if not already qualified. Because Challenge Cup winner Montpellier qualified via the Top 14, its place passed to the top team from that league not already qualified. Plain background indicates teams that earned a place in the 2016–17 European Rugby Challenge Cup.

4 September 2015	(1 BP) Ulster (Ireland)	28–6	(Wales) Ospreys	Ravenhill Stadium, Belfast
19:35	Try: Herring 5' m McCloskey 26' c Herbst 52' m L. Marshall 78' m Con: McCloskey (1/3); Pen: McCloskey (2/2) 9', 47'	Report	Pen: S. Davies (2/3) 20', 35'; Cards: Bearman (yellow card)	Attendance: 13,544; Referee: Ian Davies (WRU)
Ulster lineup: 1. Andrew Warwick, 2. Rob Herring, 3. Wiehahn Herbst, 4. Dan Tuohy, 5. Franco van der Merwe, 6. Roger Wilson, 7. Willie Faloon, 8. Nick Williams, 9. Paul Marshall, 10. Peter Nelson, 11. Craig Gilroy, 12. Stuart McCloskey, 13. Luke Marshall, 14. Andrew Trimble, 15. Louis Ludik.; Replacements: 16. John Andrew (for L. Marshall 68'), 17. Ricky Lutton (for Herbst 59'), 18. Bronson Ross, 19. Peter Browne (for Tuohy 54'), 20. Clive Ross (for Wilson 2-14', 34-40', for Williams 56'), 21. Sean Reidy (for Faloon 66'), 22. David Shanahan (for Trimble 67'), 23. Sammy Arnold (for McCloskey 59').				Attendance: 13,544; Referee: Ian Davies (WRU)

12 September 2015	Scarlets (Wales)	22–12	(Ireland) Ulster	Parc y Scarlets, Llanelli
15:00	Try: Parkes 45' c Con: D. Jones (1/1); Pen: D. Jones (4/5) 2', 18', 24', 62'; Thomas (1/1) 80'; Cards: Edwards (yellow card); Barclay (yellow card); Earle (yellow card)	Report	Try: Scholes 54' m penalty try 71' c Con: McCloskey (1/2)	Attendance: 6,061; Referee: Andrew Brace (IRFU)
Ulster lineup: 1. Andrew Warwick, 2. Rob Herring (c), 3. Wiehahn Herbst, 4. Peter Browne, 5. Franco van der Merwe, 6. Roger Wilson, 7. Willie Faloon, 8. Nick Williams, 9. Paul Marshall, 10. Peter Nelson, 11. Rory Scholes, 12. Stuart McCloskey, 13. Luke Marshall, 14. Craig Gilroy, 15. Louis Ludik.; Replacements: 16. John Andrew, 17. Callum Black (for Warwick 57'), 18. Ricky Lutton (for Herbst 57'), 19. Robbie Diack (for Browne 57'), 20. Clive Ross, 21. David Shanahan (for P. Marshall 80'), 22. Sammy Arnold (for Scholes 78'), 23. David Busby.				Attendance: 6,061; Referee: Andrew Brace (IRFU)

2 October 2015	(1 BP) Ulster (Ireland)	48–7	(Italy) Benetton Treviso	Ravenhill Stadium, Belfast
18:05	Try: Tuohy 6' c Reidy 21' c P. Marshall 33' m Gilroy (2) 39' m, 62' c Browne 55' c Stevenson 76' c Con: McCloskey (3/5); Nelson (2/2); Pen: McCloskey (1/2) 11'	Report	Try: Christie 46' c Con: Hayward (1/1); Cards: Harden (yellow card); Barbieri (yellow card)	Attendance: 14,398; Referee: Lloyd Linton (SRU)
Ulster lineup: 1. Andrew Warwick, 2. Rob Herring (c), 3. Wiehahn Herbst, 4. Peter Browne, 5. Dan Tuohy, 6. Robbie Diack, 7. Sean Reidy, 8. Roger Wilson, 9. Paul Marshall, 10. Peter Nelson, 11. Craig Gilroy, 12. Stuart McCloskey, 13. Luke Marshall, 14. Andrew Trimble, 15. Louis Ludik.; Replacements: 16. Paul Jackson (for Herring 75), 17. Callum Black (for Warwick 54'), 18. Bronson Ross (for Herbst 66'), 19. Lewis Stevenson (for Browne 58'), 20. Clive Ross (for Diack 69'), 21. David Shanahan (for P. Marshall 64'), 22. Sammy Arnold (for McCloskey 67'), 23. Rory Scholes (for Trimble 62').				Attendance: 14,398; Referee: Lloyd Linton (SRU)

16 October 2015	Edinburgh (Scotland)	16–10	(Ireland) Ulster (1 BP)	Murrayfield Stadium, Edinburgh
19:45	Try: Watson 54' c Con: Tonks (1/1); Pen: Tonks (3/4) 5', 17', 65'	Report	Try: Reidy 44' c Con: Nelson (1/1); Pen: Nelson (1/1) 24'	Attendance: 4,324; Referee: Dudley Phillips (IRFU)
Ulster lineup: 1. Callum Black, 2. Rob Herring (c), 3. Wiehahn Herbst, 4. Dan Tuohy, 5. Franco van der Merwe, 6. Roger Wilson, 7. Sean Reidy, 8. Nick Williams, 9. Paul Marshall, 10. Peter Nelson, 11. Andrew Trimble, 12. Stuart McCloskey, 13. Sammy Arnold, 14. Craig Gilroy, 15. Louis Ludik.; Replacements: 16. John Andrew, 17. Andrew Warwick (for Black 57'), 18. Bronson Ross (for Herbst 57'), 19. Lewis Stevenson (for Tuohy 36'), 20. Willie Faloon (for Wilson 52'), 21. David Shanahan, 22. Ian Humphreys, 23. Rory Scholes.				Attendance: 4,324; Referee: Dudley Phillips (IRFU)

23 October 2015	(1 BP) Ulster (Ireland)	24–17	(Wales) Cardiff Blues (1 BP)	Ravenhill Stadium, Belfast
19:35	Try: Trimble 18' m P. Marshall 40' c Williams 45' c McCloskey 49' m Con: Humphreys (2/4); Cards: Herbst (yellow card)	Report	Try: Navidi 56' m Pen: Patchell (4/4) 3', 22', 36', 72'; Cards: Turnbull (yellow card)	Attendance: 15,886; Referee: Ben Whitehouse (WRU)
Ulster lineup: 1. Callum Black, 2. Rob Herring (c), 3. Wiehahn Herbst, 4. Lewis Stevenson, 5. Franco van der Merwe, 6. Roger Wilson, 7. Sean Reidy, 8. Nick Williams, 9. Paul Marshall, 10. Ian Humphreys, 11. Craig Gilroy, 12. Stuart McCloskey, 13. Sammy Arnold, 14. Andrew Trimble, 15. Louis Ludik.; Replacements: 16. John Andrew, 17. Andrew Warwick (for Black 54'), 18. Ricky Lutton (for Herbst 55'), 19. Peter Browne (for Stevenson 54'), 20. Willie Faloon, 21. David Shanahan, 22. Paddy Jackson (for Humphreys 51'), 23. Darren Cave (for Arnold 54').				Attendance: 15,886; Referee: Ben Whitehouse (WRU)

30 October 2015	(1 BP) Munster (Ireland)	32–28	(Ireland) Ulster (2 BP)	Thomond Park, Limerick
18:00	Try: Conway 16' c Copeland 29' c Van den Heever 33' m Hurley 60' m Zebo 65' m Con: Keatley (2/5); Pen: Keatley (1/1) 49'	Report; Match centre	Try: Gilroy (2) 2' m, 26' m Williams 38' m Tuohy 67' c Con: Pad. Jackson (1/4); Pen: Pad. Jackson (1/1) 20'; Drop: Pad. Jackson (1/1) 45'	Attendance: 13,039; Referee: Marius Mitrea (FIR)
Ulster lineup: 1. Andrew Warwick, 2. Rob Herring (c), 3. Wiehahn Herbst, 4. Lewis Stevenson, 5. Franco van der Merwe, 6. Roger Wilson, 7. Sean Reidy, 8. Nick Williams, 9. Paul Marshall, 10. Paddy Jackson, 11. Andrew Trimble, 12. Stuart McCloskey, 13. Darren Cave, 14. Craig Gilroy, 15. Peter Nelson.; Replacements: 16. John Andrew, 17. Callum Black (for Warwick 51'), 18. Ricky Lutton (for Herbst 67'), 19. Dan Tuohy (for Van der Merwe 63'), 20. Chris Henry (for Reidy 53'), 21. Paul Rowley, 22. Ian Humphreys, 23. Sammy Arnold (for Gilroy 21-27', for Trimble 40').				Attendance: 13,039; Referee: Marius Mitrea (FIR)

8 November 2015	(1 BP) Newport Gwent Dragons (Wales)	12–19	(Ireland) Ulster	Rodney Parade, Newport
14:30	Pen: D. Jones (3/3) 10', 16', 19'; Tovey (1/1) 62'; Cards: Landman (yellow card)	Report	Try: P. Marshall 50' c Con: Pad. Jackson (1/1); Pen: Pad. Jackson (4/5) 25', 34', 69', 71'; Cards: McCloskey (yellow card); Best (yellow card)	Attendance: 4,483; Referee: Dudley Phillips (IRFU)
Ulster lineup: 1. Kyle McCall, 2. Rob Herring (c), 3. Wiehahn Herbst, 4. Dan Tuohy, 5. Franco van der Merwe, 6. Robbie Diack, 7. Chris Henry, 8. Stephen Mulholland, 9. Paul Marshall, 10. Paddy Jackson, 11. Sammy Arnold, 12. Stuart McCloskey, 13. Darren Cave, 14. Rory Scholes, 15. Peter Nelson.; Replacements: 16. Rory Best (for Herring 53'), 17. Ricky Lutton (for Herbest 66'), 18. Bronson Ross, 19. Lewis Stevenson (for Van der Merwe 74'), 20. Sean Reidy (for Mulholland 68'), 21. Ruan Pienaar (for P. Marshall 56'), 22. Ian Humphreys, 23. Craig Gilroy (for Arnold 59').				Attendance: 4,483; Referee: Dudley Phillips (IRFU)

27 November 2015	Leinster (Ireland)	8–3	(Ireland) Ulster (1 BP)	RDS Arena, Dublin
19:35	Try: Cronin 36' m Pen: Sexton (1/1) 5'	Report	Pen: Pad. Jackson (1/2) 13'	Attendance: 15,552; Referee: John Lacey (IRFU)
Ulster lineup: 1. Kyle McCall, 2. Rory Best (c), 3. Wiehahn Herbst, 4. Iain Henderson, 5. Dan Tuohy, 6. Robbie Diack, 7. Sean Reidy, 8. Nick Williams, 9. Ruan Pienaar, 10. Paddy Jackson, 11. Andrew Trimble, 12. Stuart McCloskey, 13. Darren Cave, 14. Craig Gilroy, 15. Peter Nelson.; Replacements: 16. Rob Herring (for Best 76'), 17. Andrew Warwick, 18. Ricky Lutton (for Herbst 55'), 19. Roger Wilson (for Diack 61'), 20. Chris Henry (for Reidy 43'), 21. Paul Marshall (for Pienaar 74'), 22. Ian Humphreys, 23. Louis Ludik (for McCloskey 74').				Attendance: 15,552; Referee: John Lacey (IRFU)

4 December 2015	Ulster (Ireland)	14–7	(Scotland) Edinburgh (1 BP)	Ravenhill Stadium, Belfast
19:35	Try: penalty try 4' c Scholes 10' c Con: Pad. Jackson (2/2)	Report	Try: Du Preez 47' c Con: Cuthbert (1/1)	Attendance: 12,640; Referee: Ian Davies (WRU)
Ulster lineup: 1. Kyle McCall, 2. Rob Herring (c), 3. Ricky Lutton, 4. Dan Tuohy, 5. Franco van der Merwe, 6. Iain Henderson, 7. Chris Henry, 8. Nick Williams, 9. Ruan Pienaar, 10. Paddy Jackson, 11. Rory Scholes, 12. Luke Marshall, 13. Darren Cave, 14. Andrew Trimble, 15. Peter Nelson.; Replacements: 16. John Andrew (for Tuohy 60'), 17. Andrew Warwick (for McCall 62'), 18. Wiehahn Herbst (for Lutton 42'), 19. Alan O'Connor (For Van der Merwe 58'), 20. Clive Ross, 21. Paul Marshall, 22. Stuart McCloskey, 23. Louis Ludik.				Attendance: 12,640; Referee: Ian Davies (WRU)

26 December 2015	(1 BP) Connacht (Ireland)	3–10	(Ireland) Ulster	The Sportsground, Galway
18:00	Pen: MacGinty (1/1) 63'	Report	Try: Williams 76' c Con: Pad. Jackson (1/1); Pen: Pad. Jackson (1/1) 32'; Cards: L. Marshall (yellow card)	Attendance: 5,876; Referee: Peter Fitzgibbon (IRFU)
Ulster lineup: 1. Andrew Warwick, 2. Rob Herring (c), 3. Wiehahn Herbst, 4. Alan O'Connor, 5. Franco van der Merwe, 6. Robbie Diack, 7. Sean Reidy, 8. Nick Williams, 9. Ruan Pienaar, 10. Paddy Jackson, 11. Rory Scholes, 12. Stuart McCloskey, 13. Luke Marshall, 14. Andrew Trimble, 15. Louis Ludik.; Replacements: 16. John Andrew, 17. Callum Black (for Warwick 43'), 18. Ricky Lutton (for Herbst 50'), 19. Stephen Mulholland (for O'Connor 70'), 20. Roger Wilson (for Reidy 55'), 21. Paul Marshall (for Pienaar 68'), 22. Ian Humphreys, 23. Sammy Arnold.				Attendance: 5,876; Referee: Peter Fitzgibbon (IRFU)

2 January 2016	(1 BP) Ulster (Ireland)	7–9	(Ireland) Munster	Ravenhill Stadium, Belfast
15:00	Try: Ludik 23' c Con: Pad. Jackson (1/1)	Report	Pen: Keatley (2/2) 8', 60'; Drop: Keatley (1/1) 57'	Attendance: 17,211; Referee: Gary Conway (IRFU)
Ulster lineup: 1. Kyle McCall, 2. Rory Best (c), 3. Wiehahn Herbst, 4. Lewis Stevenson, 5. Franco van der Merwe, 6. Robbie Diack, 7. Chris Henry, 8. Nick Williams, 9. Ruan Pienaar, 10. Paddy Jackson, 11. Rory Scholes, 12. Stuart McCloskey, 13. Luke Marshall, 14. Andrew Trimble, 15. Louis Ludik.; Replacements: 16. Rob Herring (for Williams 71'), 17. Callum Black (for McCall 64'), 18. Ricky Lutton, 19. Alan O'Connor (for Stevenson 52'), 20. Roger Wilson (for Diack 52'), 21. Paul Marshall (for Pienaar 71'), 22. Ian Humphreys, 23. Sammy Arnold (for L. Marshall 54').				Attendance: 17,211; Referee: Gary Conway (IRFU)

30 January 2016	Benetton Treviso (Italy)	13–32	(Ireland) Ulster (1 BP)	Stadio Comunale di Monigo, Treviso
18:00	Try: Steyn 77' c Con: Hayward (1/1); Pen: Hayward (2/2) 32', 48'	Report	Try: Reidy 52' c Cave 57' c Scholes 62' c Olding 71' m Con: Humphreys (2/2); Olding (1/2); Pen: Humphreys (2/2) 10', 38'	Attendance: 2,500; Referee: Ian Davies (WRU)
Ulster lineup: 1. Callum Black, 2. Rob Herring (c), 3. Ricky Lutton, 4. Alan O'Connor, 5. Franco van der Merwe, 6. Clive Ross, 7. Sean Reidy, 8. Roger Wilson, 9. Paul Marshall, 10. Ian Humphreys, 11. Craig Gilroy, 12. Stuart Olding, 13. Darren Cave, 14. Rory Scholes, 15. Louis Ludik.; Replacements: 16. John Andrew (for Herring 72'), 17. Andrew Warwick, 18. Bronson Ross (for Lutton 62'), 19. Peter Browne (for O'Connor 62'), 20. Robbie Diack, 21. David Shanahan (for P. Marshall 73'), 22. Luke Marshall (for Humphreys 60'), 23. Jacob Stockdale (for Gilroy 72').				Attendance: 2,500; Referee: Ian Davies (WRU)

5 February 2016	Ulster (Ireland)	17–15	(Wales) Newport Gwent Dragons (1 BP)	Ravenhill Stadium, Belfast
19:35	Try: Reidy 24' c penalty try 52' c Con: Humphreys (1/1); Pad. Jackson (1/1); Pen: Pad. Jackson (1/2) 77'	Report	Try: Hughes 16' c Meyer 46' m Con: O'Brien (1/2); Pen: O'Brien (1/1) 4'; Cards: Screech (yellow card); White (yellow card)	Attendance: 13,768; Referee: Nigel Owens (WRU)
Ulster lineup: 1. Callum Black, 2. Rob Herring (c), 3. Ricky Lutton, 4. Alan O'Connor, 5. Peter Browne, 6. Robbie Diack, 7. Sean Reidy, 8. Roger Wilson, 9. Ruan Pienaar, 10. Ian Humphreys, 11. Jacob Stockdale, 12. Stuart Olding, 13. Darren Cave, 14. Craig Gilroy, 15. Louis Ludik.; Replacements: 16. John Andrew (for Browne 56'), 17. Kyle McCall (for Black 49'), 18. Bronson Ross (for Reidy 53'), 19. Clive Ross, 20. Nick Williams (for Diack 41'), 21. Paul Marshall (for Olding 66'), 22. Paddy Jackson (for Humphreys 41'), 23. Stuart McCloskey.				Attendance: 13,768; Referee: Nigel Owens (WRU)

12 February 2016	Ulster (Ireland)	13–10	(Scotland) Glasgow Warriors (1 BP)	Ravenhill Stadium, Belfast
19:30	Try: Black 52' c Con: Pad. Jackson (1/1); Pen: Pienaar (1/2) 22'; Pad. Jackson (1/1) 66'	Report	Try: Jones 9' m Naiyaravoro 80' m Cards: Wilson (yellow card)	Attendance: 16,477; Referee: Marius Mitrea (FIR)
Ulster lineup: 1. Callum Black, 2. Rob Herring (c), 3. Ricky Lutton, 4. Alan O'Connor, 5. Franco van der Merwe, 6. Robbie Diack, 7. Sean Reidy, 8. Nick Williams, 9. Ruan Pienaar, 10. Sam Windsor, 11. Jacob Stockdale, 12. Stuart McCloskey, 13. Darren Cave, 14. Craig Gilroy, 15. Stuart Olding.; Replacements: 16. John Andrew (for Herring 43'), 17. Kyle McCall (for Black 57'), 18. Bronson Ross (for Lutton 77'), 19. Chris Henry (for Reidy 52'), 20. Roger Wilson (for Williams 64'), 21. Paul Marshall (for Pienaar 30'), 22. Paddy Jackson (for Windsor 40'), 23. Sammy Arnold (for Stockdale 74').				Attendance: 16,477; Referee: Marius Mitrea (FIR)

21 February 2016	(1 BP) Ulster (Ireland)	20–21	(Wales) Scarlets	Ravenhill Stadium, Belfast
14:30	Try: Gilroy 20' c L. Marshall 36' c Con: Pad. Jackson (2/2); Pen: Pad. Jackson (1/1) 63'; Drop: Pad. Jackson (1/1) 16'; Cards: Henry (yellow card)	Report	Try: Collins (2) 4' m, 23' c Con: Thomas (1/2); Pen: Thomas (3/4) 14', 46', 49'	Attendance: 15,201; Referee: Ian Davies (WRU)
Ulster lineup: 1. Andrew Warwick, 2. John Andrew, 3. Ricky Lutton, 4. Alan O'Connor, 5. Franco van der Merwe, 6. Robbie Diack, 7. Chris Henry, 8. Roger Wilson, 9. Paul Marshall, 10. Paddy Jackson, 11. Jacob Stockdale, 12. Luke Marshall, 13. Darren Cave, 14. Craig Gilroy, 15. Stuart Olding.; Replacements: 16. Jonny Murphy, 17. Kyle McCall, 18. Bronson Ross, 19. Peter Browne (for O'Connor 26'), 20. Clive Ross (for Van der Merwe'), 21. Ruan Pienaar (for P. Marshall 60'), 22. Ian Humphreys, 23. Sammy Arnold.				Attendance: 15,201; Referee: Ian Davies (WRU)

28 February 2016	Cardiff Blues (Wales)	23–13	(Ireland) Ulster	Cardiff Arms Park
14:30	Try: Patchell 72' c Summerhill 77' c Con: Patchell (2/2); Pen: Patchell (3/5) 40', 42', 65'	Report	Try: Gilroy 45' c Con: Pad. Jackson (1/1); Pen: Pad. Jackson (2/4) 31', 36'	Attendance: 5,279; Referee: John Lacey (IRFU)
Ulster lineup: 1. Callum Black, 2. John Andrew, 3. Bronson Ross, 4. Peter Browne, 5. Franco van der Merwe, 6. Robbie Diack, 7. Chris Henry, 8. Nick Williams, 9. Ruan Pienaar, 10. Paddy Jackson, 11. Jacob Stockdale, 12. Sammy Arnold, 13. Luke Marshall, 14. Craig Gilroy, 15. Stuart Olding.; Replacements: 16. Jonny Murphy, 17. Kyle McCall (for Black 48'), 18. Ricky Lutton (for B. Ross 41'), 19. Roger Wilson (for Van der Merwe 65'), 20. Sean Reidy (for Henry 55'), 21. Paul Marshall (for Pienaar 78'), 22. Darren Cave (for L. Marshall 6'), 23. Rory Scholes (for Arnold 69').				Attendance: 5,279; Referee: John Lacey (IRFU)

4 March 2016	(1 BP) Ulster (Ireland)	32–0	(Italy) Zebre	Ravenhill Stadium, Belfast
19:35	Try: Williams (2) 10' c, 29' c Browne 62' m P. Marshall 77' c Con: Pad. Jackson (3/4); Pen: Pad. Jackson (2/2) 4', 8'	Report		Attendance: 15,726; Referee: George Clancy (IRFU)
Ulster lineup: 1. Kyle McCall, 2. Rob Herring, 3. Ricky Lutton, 4. Peter Browne, 5. Franco van der Merwe, 6. Robbie Diack, 7. Chris Henry, 8. Nick Williams, 9. Ruan Pienaar, 10. Paddy Jackson, 11. Jacob Stockdale, 12. Stuart Olding, 13. Luke Marshall, 14. Rory Scholes, 15. Craig Gilroy.; Replacements: 16. John Andrew (for Herring 58'), 17. Callum Black, 18. Andrew Warwick, 19. Roger Wilson (for Williams 64'), 20. Sean Reidy (for Browne 66'), 21. Paul Marshall, 22. Sam Windsor, 23. Darren Cave (for L. Marshall 64').				Attendance: 15,726; Referee: George Clancy (IRFU)

25 March 2016	Glasgow Warriors (Scotland)	27–17	(Ireland) Ulster	Scotstoun Stadium, Glasgow
19:35	Try: Hogg 58' m Seymour 61' c Con: Russell (1/2); Pen: Russell (4/6) 23', 28', 39', 72'; Hogg (1/1) 80'	Report	Try: Henderson 3' c McCloskey 44' c Con: Pad. Jackson (2/2); Pen: Pad. Jackson (1/1) 34'	Attendance: 6,800; Referee: John Lacey (IRFU)
Ulster lineup: 1. Callum Black, 2. Rob Herring (c), 3. Ricky Lutton, 4. Alan O'Connor, 5. Franco van der Merwe, 6. Iain Henderson, 7. Chris Henry, 8. Nick Williams, 9. Ruan Pienaar, 10. Paddy Jackson, 11. Rory Scholes, 12. Stuart McCloskey, 13. Luke Marshall, 14. Craig Gilroy, 15. Stuart Olding.; Replacements: 16. John Andrew, 17. Kyle McCall (for Black 63'), 18. Andrew Warwick (for Lutton 75'), 19. Robbie Diack (for O'Connor 27'), 20. Sean Reidy (for Williams 41'), 21. Paul Marshall (for Pienaar 75'), 22. Sam Windsor, 23. Darren Cave (for Scholes 75').				Attendance: 6,800; Referee: John Lacey (IRFU)

1 April 2016	Ulster (Ireland)	18–10	(Ireland) Connacht	Ravenhill Stadium, Belfast
19:35	Try: R. Best 27' m Gilroy 43' c Con: Pad. Jackson (1/2); Pen: Pad. Jackson (2/2) 5', 12'; Cards: Trimble (yellow card)	Report	Try: Blade 54' c Con: O'Leary (1/1); Pen: O'Leary (1/2) 40'; Cards: O'Leary (yellow card); O'Brien (yellow card)	Attendance: 16,224; Referee: Dudley Phillips (IRFU)
Ulster lineup: 1. Callum Black, 2. Rory Best (c), 3. Ricky Lutton, 4. Peter Browne, 5. Franco van der Merwe, 6. Iain Henderson, 7. Chris Henry, 8. Roger Wilson, 9. Ruan Pienaar, 10. Paddy Jackson, 11. Craig Gilroy, 12. Stuart McCloskey, 13. Luke Marshall, 14. Andrew Trimble, 15. Jared Payne.; Replacements: 16. Rob Herring (for Best 86-71, for Henderson 78'), 17. Kyle McCall (for Black 55'), 18. Bronson Ross (for Lutton 77'), 19. Robbie Diack (for Browne 58'), 20. Sean Reidy (for Henry 55'), 21. Paul Marshall (for Pienaar 66'), 22. Stuart Olding (for McCloskey 75'), 23. Darren Cave (for L. Marshall 63').				Attendance: 16,224; Referee: Dudley Phillips (IRFU)

16 April 2016	Zebre (Italy)	17–47	(Ireland) Ulster (1 BP)	Stadio Sergio Lanfranchi, Parma
17:00	Try: Palazzani 6' c Beyers 59' c Con: Canna (2/2); Pen: Canna (1/1) 18'; Cards: Palazzani (yellow card)	Report	Try: Pienaar 2' c Bowe (2) 12' c, 78' c Gilroy 24' c Payne (3) 39' m, 42' c, 51' c Con: Pad. Jackson (3/4); Pienaar (2/2); Olding (1/1)	Attendance: 3,000; Referee: Nigel Owens (WRU)
Ulster lineup: 1. Callum Black, 2. Rory Best (c), 3. Ricky Lutton, 4. Peter Browne, 5. Franco van der Merwe, 6. Iain Henderson, 7. Sean Reidy, 8. Roger Wilson, 9. Ruan Pienaar, 10. Paddy Jackson, 11. Craig Gilroy, 12. Stuart Olding, 13. Luke Marshall, 14. Tommy Bowe, 15. Jared Payne.; Replacements: 16. Rob Herring (for Best 46'), 17. Kyle McCall (for Black 53'), 18. Andrew Warwick (for Lutton 60'), 19. Robbie Diack (for Van der Merwe 46'), 20. Chris Henry (for Wilson 46'), 21. Paul Marshall (for Pienaar 60'), 22. Darren Cave (for Jackson 44'), 23. Rory Scholes (for L. Marshall 73).				Attendance: 3,000; Referee: Nigel Owens (WRU)

30 April 2016	Ulster (Ireland)	30–6	(Ireland) Leinster	Ravenhill Stadium, Belfast
15:00	Try: penalty try 18' c Payne 57' c Pad. Jackson 78' c Con: Pad. Jackson (2/2); P. Marshall (1/1); Pen: Pad. Jackson (3/3) 11', 54', 70'	Report	Pen: Sexton (2/2) 27', 36'; Cards: Kearney (yellow card); Fitzgerald (yellow card)	Attendance: 17,332; Referee: George Clancy (IRFU)
Ulster lineup: 1. Callum Black, 2. Rory Best (c), 3. Ricky Lutton, 4. Peter Browne, 5. Franco van der Merwe, 6. Iain Henderson, 7. Chris Henry, 8. Sean Reidy, 9. Ruan Pienaar, 10. Paddy Jackson, 11. Craig Gilroy, 12. Stuart McCloskey, 13. Luke Marshall, 14. Andrew Trmble, 15. Jared Payne.; Replacements: 16. Rob Herring (for Best 67'), 17. Kyle McCall (for Black 50'), 18. Andrew Warwick (for Lutton 67'), 19. Robbie Diack (for Browne 63'), 20. Roger Wilson (for Henry 54'), 21. Paul Marshall (for Pienaar 73'), 22. Stuart Olding (for McCloskey 54'), 23. Darren Cave (for L. Marshall 73').				Attendance: 17,332; Referee: George Clancy (IRFU)

7 May 2016	(1 BP) Ospreys (Wales)	26–46	(Ireland) Ulster (1 BP)	Liberty Stadium, Swansea
15:00	Try: Biggar 11' c Jos. Matavesi 35' c Grabham (2) 65' m, 74' c Con: Biggar (3/4)	Report	Try: Pad. Jackson 16' c R. Best 26' c Trimble 39' c Henry 55' c Olding 68' c Van der Merwe 76' m Con: Pad. Jackson (5/6); Pen: Pad. Jackson (2/2) 41', 58'	Attendance: 9,923; Referee: Marius Mitrea (FIR)
Ulster lineup: 1. Callum Black, 2. Rory Best (c), 3. Ricky Lutton, 4. Peter Browne, 5. Franco van der Merwe, 6. Iain Henderson, 7. Chris Henry, 8. Sean Reidy, 9. Ruan Pienaar, 10. Paddy Jackson, 11. Craig Gilroy, 12. Stuart McCloskey, 13. Luke Marshall, 14. Andrew Trmble, 15. Jared Payne.; Replacements: 16. Rob Herring (for Best 67'), 17. Kyle McCall (for Black 48'), 18. Andrew Warwick (for Lutton 64'), 19. Robbie Diack (for Browne 56'), 20. Roger Wilson (for Henderson 56'), 21. Paul Marshall (for Pienaar 72'), 22. Stuart Olding (for McCloskey 56'), 23. Darren Cave (for L. Marshall 58').				Attendance: 9,923; Referee: Marius Mitrea (FIR)

=== Semi-finals ===
20 May 2016	Leinster (Ireland)	30–18	(Ireland) Ulster	RDS Arena, Dublin
19:45	Try: Nacewa 4' c Heaslip 47' c Cronin 64' c Con: Sexton (3/3); Pen: Sexton (3/3) 10', 15', 56'	Report	Try: Gilroy (2) 38' m, 69' c Con: Pad. Jackson (1/2); Pen: Pad. Jackson (2/2) 26', 31'	Attendance: 19,100; Referee: Ian Davies (WRU)
Ulster lineup: 1. Callum Black, 2. Rory Best (c), 3. Ricky Lutton, 4. Peter Browne, 5. Franco van der Merwe, 6. Iain Henderson, 7. Chris Henry, 8. Sean Reidy, 9. Ruan Pienaar, 10. Paddy Jackson, 11. Craig Gilroy, 12. Stuart McCloskey, 13. Luke Marshall, 14. Andrew Trimble, 15. Jared Payne.; Replacements: 16. Rob Herring (for Best 73'), 17. Kyle McCall (for Black 46'), 18. Andrew Warwick (for Lutton 61'), 19. Robbie Diack (for Browne 66'), 20. Roger Wilson (for Reidy 61'), 21. Paul Marshall (for Pienaar 76'), 22. Stuart Olding (for McCloskey 57'), 23. Darren Cave (for L. Marshall 68').				Attendance: 19,100; Referee: Ian Davies (WRU)

=== End of season awards ===
Wing Craig Gilroy was joint top try scorer with 10, and was named in the Pro12 Dream Team. Ulster won the competition's Fair Play award.

== Home attendance ==
Domestic League					European Cup					Total	
League	Fixtures	Average Attendance	Highest	Lowest	League	Fixtures	Average Attendance	Highest	Lowest	Total Attendance	Average Attendance
2015–16 Pro12	11	15,310	17,332	12,640	2015–16 European Rugby Champions Cup	3	16,111	17,108	15,108	216,740	15,481

== Friendlies ==
21 August 2015	Ulster (Ireland)	21-24	(Ireland) Leinster	Ravenhill Stadium, Belfast
	Try: P. Marshall; L. Marshall; Stockdale; Con: Humphreys (2); Windsor	Report	Try: A. Byrne; Conan; Leavy; B. Byrne; Con: Nacewa (2)
Ulster lineup: 1. Ruaidhri Murphy, 2. Rob Herring (c), 3. Wiehahn Herbst, 4. Peter Browne, 5. Franco van der Merwe, 6. Clive Ross, 7. Sean Reidy, 8. Robbie Diack, 9. Paul Marshall, 10. Ian Humphreys, 11. Peter Nelson, 12. Luke Marshall, 13. Darren Cave, 14. Craig Gilroy, 15. Jack Owens.; Replacements: Andrew Warwick, John Andrew, Ricky Lutton, Bronson Ross, Alan O'Connor, Dan Tuohy, Conor Joyce, Frank Taggart, Willie Faloon, Stephen Mulholland, Paul Rowley, David Shanahan, Sam Windsor, Jacob Stockdale, Stuart McCloskey, Sammy Arnold, Louis Ludik, Mark Best.

28 August 2015	Edinburgh (Scotland)	23-10	(Ireland) Ulster	Murrayfield Stadium, Edinburgh
	Try: Bradbury; Katoa; Con: Fowles (2); Pen: Fowles; Jack Cuthbert (2)	Report	Try: Bowe; Trimble
Ulster lineup: 1. Andrew Warwick, 2. Rob Herring, 3. Wiehahn Herbst, 4. Dan Tuohy, 5. Franco van der Merwe, 6. Clive Ross, 7. Sean Reidy, 8. Robbie Diack, 9. Paul Marshall, 10. Sam Windsor, 11. Andrew Trimble, 12. Stuart McCloskey, 13. Luke Marshall, 14. Tommy Bowe, 15. Craig Gilroy.; Replacements: Paul Jackson, Ruaidhri Murphy, Ricky Lutton, Peter Browne, Willie Faloon, David Shanahan, Sammy Arnold, Louis Ludik, Peter Nelson, Conor Joyce.

== Ulster Women ==
=== 2015-16 Women's Interprovincial Series ===
	Team	P	W	D	L	PF	PA	BP	Pts
1	Munster	3	3	0	0	66	10	0	10
2	Leinster	3	2	0	1	60	20	1	9
3	Connacht	3	1	0	2	23	35	2	6
4	Ulster	3	0	0	3	12	96	3	3

22 August 2015	Ulster	0-38	Leinster	Chambers Park, Portadown

29 August 2015	Munster	43-0	Ulster	Thomond Park, Limerick

5 September 2015	Ulster	12-15	Connacht	Chambers Park, Portadown

== Ulster Rugby Awards ==
The Heineken Ulster Rugby Awards ceremony was held at the Culloden Estate and Spa, Holywood. Winners were:

- Bank of Ireland Ulster Player of the Year: Stuart McCloskey
- Heineken Ulster Rugby Personality of the Year: Nick Williams
- BT Young Player of the Year: Kyle McCall
- Rugby Writers Player of the Year: Franco van der Merwe
- Ulster Rugby Supporters Club Player of the Year: Paddy Jackson
- Abbey Insurance Academy Player of the Year: Adam McBurney

== Season reviews ==
- Ulster: Season Review 2015 – 2016, The Front Row Union, 23 May 2016
