= 2013–14 Ulster Rugby season =

Ulster Rugby
- 2013–14 season
- Head Coach: Mark Anscombe
- Director of Rugby: David Humphreys
- Captain: Johann Muller
- Pro12: Semi-final
- Heineken Cup: Quarter-final
- Top try scorer: All: Tommy Bowe (6); Luke Marshall (6); Andrew Trimble (6)
- Top points scorer: All: Paddy Jackson (239)
Home colours	Away colours

The 2013–14 season was Ulster's 20th season since the advent of professionalism in rugby union, and their second under head coach Mark Anscombe. They competed in the Heineken Cup and the Pro12.

They finished fourth in the Pro12, qualifying for the semi-finals and next season's Champions Cup. They lost the semi-final to Leinster. Ulster and Connacht jointly won the Fair Play Award, and wing Andrew Trimble and lock Johann Muller made the Pro12 Dream Team. They topped their pool in the Champions Cup, qualifying for the quarter-final, which they lost to Saracens, after Jared Payne saw an early red card. Out-half Paddy Jackson was leading scorer with 239 points. Andrew Trimble, wing Tommy Bowe and centre Luke Marshall were joint leading try scorers with six each. Andrew Trimble was Ulster's Player of the Year, and IRUPA Players' Player of the Year.

Johann Muller, flanker Stephen Ferris and utility back Paddy Wallace retired at the end of the season. Props John Afoa moved to Gloucester, and Tom Court to London Irish. David Humphreys left as director of rugby to take up the same post at Gloucester. A few weeks later, head coach Mark Anscombe resigned. Les Kiss took over as director of rugby, and Neil Doak as head coach.

== Staff ==
Position	Name	Nationality
Director of Rugby	David Humphreys	Ireland
Head Coach	Mark Anscombe	New Zealand
Team Manager	David Millar	Ireland
Backs Coach	Neil Doak	Ireland
Defence Coach	Jonny Bell	Ireland
Head of Strength & Conditioning	Jonny Davis	Ireland
Strength & Conditioning Coach	Kevin Geary	Ireland
Head of Physiotherapy	Gareth Robinson	Ireland
Physiotherapist	Alan McAldin	Ireland

== Squad ==
=== Senior squad ===
==== Players in (Season 2013/2014) ====
- (Ireland) David McIlwaine from (England) Bristol Bears
- (Ireland) James McKinney from (England) Rotherham Titans
- (Ireland) Ian Porter returning from sabbatical

==== Promoted from academy ====
- (Ireland) Ricky Andrew
- (Ireland) Chris Farrell
- (Ireland) Stuart Olding

==== Players out (Season 2013/2014) ====
- (Ireland) Ali Birch to (England) Rotherham Titans
- (Ireland) Nigel Brady to (France) Stade Aurillacois
- (Ireland) Niall O'Connor to (England) Jersey Reds
- (Australia) Adam D'Arcy to (England) Bristol Bears
- (Ireland) Neil Walsh (released)

Ulster Rugby squad
**Props**: (Ireland) **Tom Court** (27 apps, 16 starts, 5 pts); (New Zealand) **John Afoa** (15 apps, 14 starts, 10 pts); (Ireland) Callum Black (23 apps, 12 starts); (Ireland) Ricky Lutton (15 apps, 8 starts); (Ireland) **Declan Fitzpatrick** (13 apps, 6 starts); (Ireland) Andrew Warwick (6 apps, 3 starts); (Ireland) Adam Macklin (5 apps); (Ireland) Kyle McCall (2 apps); (New Zealand) Bronson Ross* (1 app); (Ireland) Paddy McAllister (no apps); **Hookers**: (Ireland) **Rob Herring** (26 apps, 20 starts); (Ireland) **Rory Best** (9 apps, 9 starts, 5 pts); (Ireland) Niall Annett (13 apps, 1 start); **Locks**: (South Africa) **Johann Muller** (c) (23 apps, 23 starts); (Ireland) **Dan Tuohy** (21 aps, 17 starts, 15 pts); (Ireland) Lewis Stevenson (17 apps, 7 starts); (Ireland) Neil McComb (8 apps, 2 starts)	**Back row**: (Ireland) **Roger Wilson** (24 apps, 22 starts, 5 pts); (Ireland) **Robbie Diack** (26 apps, 20 starts, 20 pts); (Ireland) **Chris Henry** (17 apps, 16 starts); (New Zealand) Nick Williams (19 apps, 15 starts); (Australia) Sean Doyle* (20 apps, 13 starts, 10 pts); (Ireland) **Iain Henderson** (19 apps, 10 starts); (Ireland) Mike McComish (12 apps, 3 starts); (Ireland) **Stephen Ferris** (4 apps, 2 starts); (Ireland) Conor Joyce (2 apps); **Scrum-halves**: (South Africa) **Ruan Pienaar** (17 apps, 15 starts, 127 pts); (Ireland) **Paul Marshall** (22 apps, 13 starts, 15 pts); (Ireland) Michael Heaney (11 apps, 3 starts, 5 pts); (Ireland) Ian Porter (3 apps, 2 starts); (Ireland) David Shanahan (2 apps); **Fly-halves**: (Ireland) **Paddy Jackson** (24 apps, 24 starts, 242 pts); (Ireland) James McKinney (10 aps, 4 starts, 37 pts)	**Centres**: (Ireland) **Darren Cave** (27 apps, 24 starts, 25 pts); (Ireland) **Luke Marshall** (26 apps, 24 starts, 30 pts); (Ireland) Stuart McCloskey (4 apps, 2 starts); (Ireland) Chris Farrell (2 apps, 2 starts); (Ireland) **Stuart Olding** (4 apps, 1 start); (Ireland) **Paddy Wallace** (1 app, 1 start); **Wings**: (Ireland) **Andrew Trimble** (20 apps, 20 starts, 30 pts); (Ireland) **Craig Gilroy** (21 apps, 17 starts, 20 pts); (Ireland) **Tommy Bowe** (13 apps, 13 starts, 30 pts); (Ireland) Michael Allen (16 apps, 10 starts, 15 pts); (Ireland) David McIlwaine (9 apps, 4 starts); (Ireland) Chris Cochrane (no apps); **Fullbacks**: (Ireland) Jared Payne (24 apps, 23 starts, 20 pts); (Ireland) Ricky Andrew (9 apps, 7 starts); (Ireland) Rory Scholes (4 apps, 3 starts); (Ireland) Peter Nelson (3 apps)
(c) denotes the team captain, **Bold** denotes internationally capped players. Italics denotes academy players who appeared in the senior team.^{*} denotes players qualified to play for Ireland on residency or dual nationality. Players and their allocated positions from the Ulster Rugby website.

=== Academy squad ===
==== Players in ====
- (Ireland) Stuart McCloskey from (Ireland) Dungannon RFC
- (Ireland) Andrew Warwick from (Ireland) Ballymena R.F.C.
- (Ireland) David Shanahan from (Ireland) Belvedere College
- (Ireland) John Andrew from (Ireland) Ballymena Academy
- (Ireland) Bronson Ross from (England) Coventry R.F.C.
- (Ireland) John Donnan

==== Players out ====
- (Ireland) Conor Carey
- (Ireland) Neil Faloon
- (Ireland) Sean O'Connell

Position	Name	Nationality
Elite Performance Development Manager	Allen Clarke	Ireland
Representative Team Performance Manager	Michael Black	Ireland
Academy Schools Coach	Brian McLaughlin	Ireland
Strength & Conditioning Coach	David Drake	Ireland
Strength & Conditioning Coach	Amy Davis	Ireland
Sub-Academy Fitness Coach	Matthew Maguire	Ireland
Physiotherapist	David Minion	Ireland

Ulster Rugby Academy squad
**Props**: (Ireland) Jake Caulfield (2); (Ireland) Kyle McCall (4); (Ireland) Andrew Warwick (1); (New Zealand) Bronson Ross (1); **Hookers**: (Ireland) John Andrew (1); (Ireland) Jonny Murphy (3); **Locks**: (Ireland) John Donnan (1); (Ireland) Alan O'Connor (2); (Ireland) James Simpson (3)	**Back row**: (Ireland) Conor Joyce (3); **Scrum-halves**: (Ireland) David Shanahan (1); **Fly-halves**: none	**Centres**: (Ireland) Stuart McCloskey (1); **Wings**: none; **Fullbacks**: (Ireland) Rory Scholes (2); (Ireland) Peter Nelson (3)
(c) denotes the team captain, **Bold** denotes internationally capped players, number in brackets indicates players stage in the three-year academy cycle.^{*} denotes players qualified to play for Ireland on residency or dual nationality. Players and their allocated positions from the Ulster Rugby website.

== Season record ==
Competition	Played	Won	Drawn	Lost	PF	PA	PD	TF	TA
2013-14 Heineken Cup	7	6	0	1	194	79	115	17	6
2013-14 Pro12	23	15	0	8	479	332	147	45	27
Total	30	21	0	9	673	411	262	62	33

== Heineken Cup ==
=== Pool 5 ===
Team	P	W	D	L	PF	PA	Diff	TF	TA	TB	LB	Pts
(Ireland) Ulster (1)	6	6	0	0	179	62	+117	17	4	2	0	26
(England) Leicester Tigers (7)	6	4	0	2	159	112	+47	16	9	3	2	21
(France) Montpellier	6	2	0	4	121	124	−3	14	11	2	1	11
(Italy) Benetton Treviso	6	0	0	6	41	202	−161	2	25	0	0	0
Source : www.ercrugby.com Points breakdown: *4 points for a win *2 points for a draw *1 bonus point for a loss by seven points or less *1 bonus point for scoring four or more tries in a match

11 October 2013	Ulster (Ireland)	22–16	(England) Leicester Tigers (1 BP)	Ravenhill, Belfast
20:00	Try: Bowe 15' c Con: Jackson (1/1); Pen: Jackson (5/6) 31', 39', 58', 65', 71'	Report; Match centre	Try: Mulipola 6' c Con: Flood (1/1); Pen: Flood (2/3) 19', 43'; Williams (1/1) 76'; Cards: Crane (yellow card) 58'	Attendance: 14,026; Referee: Romain Poite (FFR)
Ulster lineup: 1. Tom Court, 2. Rory Best, 3. Declan Fitzpatrick, 4. Johann Muller (c), 5. Dan Tuohy, 6. Roger Wilson, 7. Chris Henry, 8. Nick Williams, 9. Paul Marshall, 10. Paddy Jackson, 11. Tommy Bowe, 12. Luke Marshall, 13. Darren Cave, 14. Andrew Trimble, 15. Jared Payne.; Replacements: 16. Rob Herring, 17. Callum Black, 18. Ricky Lutton (for Fitzpatrick 76'), 19. Iain Henderson (for Williams 55'), 20. Robbie Diack (for Muller 65'), 21. Ruan Pienaar (for P. Marshall 46'), 22. Stuart Olding (for L Marshall 51'), 23. Michael Allen (for Bowe 72').				Attendance: 14,026; Referee: Romain Poite (FFR)

19 October 2013	Montpellier (France)	8–25	(Ireland) Ulster	Stade Yves-du-Manoir, Montpellier
16:40	Try: Audrin 50' m Pen: Pélissié (1/1) 4'	Report; Match centre	Try: Trimble 10' c Con: Jackson (1/1); Pen: Pienaar (5/7) 44', 53', 59', 70', 73'; Jackson (1/2) 80'	Attendance: 11,712; Referee: Leighton Hodges (WRU)
Ulster lineup: 1. Tom Court, 2. Rory Best, 3. Declan Fitzpatrick, 4. Johann Muller (c), 5. Dan Tuohy, 6. Robbie Diack, 7. Chris Henry, 8. Nick Williams, 9. Ruan Pienaar, 10. Paddy Jackson, 11. Tommy Bowe, 12. Luke Marshall, 13. Darren Cave, 14. Andrew Trimble, 15. Jared Payne.; Replacements: 16. Rob Herring (for Best 74'), 17. Callum Black (for Court 70'), 18. John Afoa (for Fitzpatrick 48'), 19. Lewis Stevenson (for Muller 75'), 20. Iain Henderson (for Diack 53'), 21. Paul Marshall (for Pienaar 74'), 22. Stuart Olding (for L. Marshall 50'), 23. Michael Allen (for Trimble 74').				Attendance: 11,712; Referee: Leighton Hodges (WRU)

7 December 2013	(1 BP) Ulster (Ireland)	48–0	(Italy) Benetton Treviso	Ravenhill, Belfast
18:00	Try: Jackson 4' m L. Marshall (2) 15' c, 74' c Afoa 29' c Tuohy 58' c Doyle 65' c Trimble 70' m Con: Jackson (5/7); Pen: Jackson (1/1) 40'; Cards: L. Marshall (yellow card) 51'	Report; Match centre		Attendance: 12,977; Referee: Luke Pearce (RFU)
Ulster lineup: 1. Tom Court, 2. Rob Herring, 3. John Afoa, 4. Johann Muller (c), 5. Dan Tuohy, 6. Robbie Diack, 7. Sean Doyle, 8. Roger Wilson, 9. Ruan Pienaar, 10. Paddy Jackson, 11. Craig Gilroy, 12. Luke Marshall, 13. Darren Cave, 14. Andrew Trimble, 15. Jared Payne.; Replacements: 16. Niall Annett (for Herring 69'), 17. Callum Black (for Court 60'), 18. Declan Fitzpatrick (for Afoa 66'), 19. Neil McComb (for Muller 63'), 20. Mike McComish (for Wilson 67'), 21. Paul Marshall (for Pienaar 70'), 22. Michael Allen (for Payne 63'), 23. David McIlwaine (for Trimble 71').				Attendance: 12,977; Referee: Luke Pearce (RFU)

14 December 2013	Benetton Treviso (Italy)	3–35	(Ireland) Ulster (1 BP)	Stadio Comunale di Monigo, Treviso
14:35	Pen: Di Bernardo (1/1) 29'; Cards: Williams (yellow card) 57'; McLean (yellow card) 66'	Report; Match centre	Try: L. Marshall 37' m Gilroy 62' c Diack 67' c Payne 77' c Con: Jackson (3/4); Pen: Jackson (3/5) 10', 40', 46'	Attendance: 3,880; Referee: Greg Garner (RFU)
Ulster lineup: 1. Tom Court, 2. Rob Herring, 3. John Afoa, 4. Johann Muller (c), 5. Dan Tuohy, 6. Robbie Diack, 7. Sean Doyle, 8. Roger Wilson, 9. Ruan Pienaar, 10. Paddy Jackson, 11. Craig Gilroy, 12. Luke Marshall, 13. Darren Cave, 14. Andrew Trimble, 15. Jared Payne.; Replacements: 16. Niall Annett (for Herring 70'), 17. Callum Black (for Court 63'), 18. Declan Fitzpatrick (for Afoa 70'), 19. Neil McComb (for Muller 70'), 20. Mike McComish (for Diack 70'), 21. Paul Marshall (for Pienaar 68'), 22. Michael Allen, 23. David McIlwaine.				Attendance: 3,880; Referee: Greg Garner (RFU)

10 January 2014	Ulster (Ireland)	27–16	(France) Montpellier	Ravenhill, Belfast
20:00	Try: Diack 23' c Pienaar 26' c Afoa 56' c Con: Pienaar (3/3); Pen: Pienaar (2/3) 35', 42'	Report; Match centre	Try: Tchale-Watchou 30' c Con: Escande (1/1); Pen: Escande (3/5) 6', 40', 49'	Attendance: 14,000; Referee: Wayne Barnes (RFU)
Ulster lineup: 1. Tom Court, 2. Rory Best, 3. John Afoa, 4. Johann Muller (c), 5. Dan Tuohy, 6. Robbie Diack, 7. Chris Henry, 8. Nick Williams, 9. Ruan Pienaar, 10. Paddy Jackson, 11. Craig Gilroy, 12. Luke Marshall, 13. Darren Cave, 14. Andrew Trimble, 15. Jared Payne.; Replacements: 16. Rob Herring (for Best), 17. Callum Black (for Court), 18. Declan Fitzpatrick (for Afoa), 19. Iain Henderson (for Muller), 20. Roger Wilson (for Williams), 21. Sean Doyle (for Henry), 22. Paul Marshall, 23. Michael Allen (for Gilroy).				Attendance: 14,000; Referee: Wayne Barnes (RFU)

18 January 2014	(1 BP) Leicester Tigers (England)	19–22	(Ireland) Ulster	Welford Road, Leicester
18:00	Try: Morris 49' c Con: Flood (1/1); Pen: Flood (4/5) 4', 11', 23', 46'	Report; Match centre	Try: Pienaar 58' c Con: Pienaar (1/1); Pen: Pienaar (5/5) 16', 27', 30', 56', 69'	Attendance: 24,000; Referee: Nigel Owens (WRU)
Ulster lineup: 1. Callum Black, 2. Rory Best, 3. John Afoa, 4. Johann Muller (c), 5. Dan Tuohy, 6. Roger Wilson, 7. Chris Henry, 8. Nick Williams, 9. Ruan Pienaar, 10. Paddy Jackson, 11. Craig Gilroy, 12. Luke Marshall, 13. Darren Cave, 14. Andrew Trimble, 15. Jared Payne.; Replacements: 16. Rob Herring, 17. Tom Court (for Black 56'), 18. Ricky Lutton, 19. Iain Henderson (for Tuohy 64'), 20. Robbie Diack (for Williams 55'), 21. David McIlwaine, 22. Paul Marshall, 23. Michael Allen.				Attendance: 24,000; Referee: Nigel Owens (WRU)

=== Quarter-final ===
5 April 2014	Ulster (Ireland)	15–17	(England) Saracens	Ravenhill, Belfast
18:30	Pen: Pienaar (3/5) 15', 29', 39'; Jackson (2/3) 69, 72'; Cards: Payne (red card)	Report; Match centre Video	Try: Ashton (2) 22' m, 67' c Botha 48' m Con: Farrell (1/3)	Attendance: 16,853; Referee: Jérôme Garcès (FFR)
Ulster lineup: 1. Tom Court, 2. Rory Best, 3. John Afoa, 4. Johann Muller (c), 5. Dan Tuohy, 6. Roger Wilson, 7. Chris Henry, 8. Nick Williams, 9. Ruan Pienaar, 10. Paddy Jackson, 11. Tommy Bowe, 12. Luke Marshall, 13. Darren Cave, 14. Andrew Trimble, 15. Jared Payne.; Replacements: 16. Rob Herring (for Best 13'), 17. Andrew Warwick, 18. Ricky Lutton, 19. Iain Henderson (for Tuohy 60'), 20. Stephen Ferris (for Williams 55'), 21. Robbie Diack (for Muller 69'), 22. Paul Marshall (for Pienaar 50'), 23. Craig Gilroy (for Trimble 65').				Attendance: 16,853; Referee: Jérôme Garcès (FFR)

== Pro12 ==
Pro12 Table
	Team	Played	Won	Drawn	Lost	Points For	Points Against	Points Difference	Tries For	Tries Against	Try Bonus	Losing Bonus	Points
1	(Ireland) Leinster (CH)	22	17	1	4	554	352	+202	57	30	8	4	82
2	(Scotland) Glasgow Warriors (RU)	22	18	0	4	484	309	+175	53	22	4	3	79
3	(Ireland) Munster (SF)	22	16	0	6	538	339	+199	56	27	7	3	74
4	(Ireland) Ulster (SF)	22	15	0	7	470	319	+151	45	26	6	4	70
5	(Wales) Ospreys	22	13	1	8	571	388	+183	59	32	6	6	66
6	(Wales) Scarlets	22	11	1	10	435	438	−3	43	45	3	6	55
7	(Wales) Cardiff Blues	22	8	1	13	425	538	−113	32	55	1	6	41
8	(Scotland) Edinburgh	22	7	0	15	397	526	−129	38	57	2	8	38
9	(Wales) Newport Gwent Dragons	22	7	1	14	392	492	−100	34	46	0	5	35
10	(Ireland) Connacht	22	6	0	16	371	509	−138	42	54	4	7	35
11	(Italy) Benetton Treviso	22	5	1	16	376	591	−215	31	72	1	7	30
12	(Italy) Zebre	22	5	2	15	347	559	−212	35	59	0	5	29
If teams are level at any stage, tiebreakers are applied in the following order: 1. number of matches won; 2. the difference between points for and points against; 3. the number of tries scored; 4. the most points scored; 5. the difference between tries for and tries against; 6. the fewest red cards received; 7. the fewest yellow cards received.
Green background (rows 1 to 4) are play-off places, and earn a place in the European Rugby Champions Cup. Blue background indicates teams outside the play-off places, that earn a place in the European Rugby Champions Cup. Plain background indicates teams that earn a place in the European Rugby Challenge Cup. European Rugby Champions/Challenge Cup qualification: The top team from each country, plus the three highest-placed teams apart from those, will qualify for the European Rugby Champions Cup. The remaining teams qualify for the European Rugby Challenge Cup. Updated 19 May 2014. Source: RaboDirect PRO12

6 September 2013	Newport Gwent Dragons (Wales)	15–8	(Ireland) Ulster (1 BP)	Rodney Parade, Newport
19:15	Pen: Tovey (4/6) 14', 48', 60', 70'; Drop: Tovey (1/1) 7'	Report	Try: Wilson 16' m Pen: Jackson (1/3) 11'	Attendance: 5,165; Referee: Claudio Blessano (FIR)
Ulster lineup: 1. Callum Black, 2. Rob Herring, 3. Ricky Lutton, 4. Johann Muller (c), 5. Dan Tuohy, 6. Robbie Diack, 7. Chris Henry, 8. Roger Wilson, 9. Paul Marshall, 10. Paddy Jackson, 11. David McIlwaine, 12. Chris Farrell, 13. Luke Marshall, 14. Andrew Trimble, 15. Jared Payne.; Replacements: 16. Niall Annett, 17. Tom Court (for Black 56'), 18. Declan Fitzpatrick (for Lutton 56'), 19. Lewis Stevenson (for Tuohy 66'), 20. Sean Doyle (for Henry 70'), 21. Ian Porter (for P. Marshall 70'), 22. James McKinney (for Jackson 70'), 23. Darren Cave (for Farrell 56').				Attendance: 5,165; Referee: Claudio Blessano (FIR)

13 September 2013	(1 BP) Ulster (Ireland)	12–13	(Scotland) Glasgow Warriors	Ravenhill, Belfast
19:05	Pen: Jackson (4/5) 8', 16', 22', 34'	Report	Try: Eddie 80' c Con: Hogg (1/1); Pen: Hogg (2/3) 6', 28'; Cards: Low (yellow card)	Attendance: 11,500; Referee: Ian Davies (WRU)
Ulster lineup: 1. Callum Black, 2. Rob Herring, 3. Declan Fitzpatrick, 4. Johann Muller (c), 5. Dan Tuohy, 6. Roger Wilson, 7. Sean Doyle, 8. Nick Williams, 9. Ian Porter, 10. Paddy Jackson, 11. Michael Allen, 12. Luke Marshall, 13. Darren Cave, 14. David McIlwaine, 15. Jared Payne.; Replacements: 16. Niall Annett, 17. Tom Court, 18. Ricky Lutton (for Fitzpatrick 56'), 19. Ian Henderson (for Muller 56'), 20. Chris Henry (for Doyle 59'), 21. Paul Marshall (for Porter 56'), 22. James McKinney, 23. Ricky Andrew.				Attendance: 11,500; Referee: Ian Davies (WRU)

21 September 2013	Connacht (Ireland)	7–18	(Ireland) Ulster	The Sportsground, Galway
18:45	Try: Parks 10' c Con: Parks (1/1)	Report; Match centre	Try: Allen 15' m Jackson 57' c Con: Jackson (1/2); Pen: Jackson (2/4) 55', 64'	Attendance: 5,485; Referee: John Lacey (IRFU)
Ulster lineup: 1. Tom Court, 2. Rob Herring, 3. Declan Fitzpatrick, 4. Johann Muller (c), 5. Iain Henderson, 6. Roger Wilson, 7. Chris Henry, 8. Nick Williams, 9. Ian Porter, 10. Paddy Jackson, 11. Michael Allen, 12. Luke Marshall, 13. Darren Cave, 14. David McIlwaine, 15. Jared Payne.; Replacements: 16. Niall Annett (for Herring 76'), 17. Kyle McCall (for Court 70'), 18. Ricky Lutton (for Fitzpatrick 43'), 19. Lewis Stevenson (for Williams 56'), 20. Robbie Diack, 21. Paul Marshall, 22. James McKinney (for Allen 72'), 23. Craig Gilroy.				Attendance: 5,485; Referee: John Lacey (IRFU)

27 September 2013	(1 BP) Ulster (Ireland)	32–13	(Italy) Benetton Treviso	Ravenhill, Belfast
19:05	Try: L. Marshall 22' c Allen (2) 29' m, 80' c Bowe 52' m Best 63' m Con: Jackson (2/5); Pen: Jackson (1/1) 11'; Cards: Stevenson (yellow card)	Report	Try: Barbieri 70' c Con: Di Bernardo (1/1); Pen: Berquist (1/1) 18'; Di Bernardo (1/1) 43'	Attendance: 10,693; Referee: Ian Davies (WRU)
Ulster lineup: 1. Tom Court, 2. Rory Best, 3. Ricky Lutton, 4. Iain Henderson, 5. Dan Tuohy, 6. Robbie Diack, 7. Chris Henry, 8. Roger Wilson, 9. Paul Marshall, 10. Paddy Jackson, 11. Michael Allen, 12. Luke Marshall, 13. Jared Payne, 14. Tommy Bowe, 15. Craig Gilroy.; Replacements: 16. Rob Herring (for Best), 17. Callum Black (for Court), 18. Bronson Ross (for Lutton), 19. Lewis Stevenson (for Henderson), 20. Nick Williams (for Wilson), 21. Michael Heaney (for P. Marshall), 22. James McKinney (for Gilroy), 23. Darren Cave (for Payne).				Attendance: 10,693; Referee: Ian Davies (WRU)

4 October 2013	(1 BP) Ospreys (Wales)	12–18	(Ireland) Ulster	Liberty Stadium, Swansea
19:05	Pen: Biggar (4/4) 21', 40', 42', 45'; Cards: Jarvis (yellow card)	Report	Pen: Jackson (6/6) 49', 53', 57', 65', 73', 77'	Attendance: 10,049; Referee: Peter Fitzgibbon (IRFU)
Ulster lineup: 1. Tom Court, 2. Rory Best, 3. Declan Fitzpatrick, 4. Johann Muller, 5. Dan Tuohy, 6. Robbie Diack, 7. Chris Henry, 8. Nick Williams, 9. Paul Marshall, 10. Paddy Jackson, 11. Michael Allen, 12. Luke Marshall, 13. Darren Cave, 14. Andrew Trimble, 15. Craig Gilroy.; Replacements: 16. Rob Herring, 17. Callum Black (for Court 65'), 18. Bronson Ross, 19. Iain Henderson (for Diack 56'), 20. Roger Wilson (for Williams 62'), 21. Michael Heaney (for P. Marshall 62'), 22. Stuart Olding (for L. Marshall 46'), 23. David McIlwaine (for Gilroy 13').				Attendance: 10,049; Referee: Peter Fitzgibbon (IRFU)

25 October 2013	(1 BP) Ulster (Ireland)	39–21	(Wales) Cardiff Blues	Ravenhill, Belfast
19:05	Try: Tuohy (2) 15' m, 80' c Payne 23' m L. Marshall 42' m Trimble 67' m Con: Pienaar (1/2); Pen: Jackson (3/4) 8', 28', 46'; Pienaar (1/2) 55'	Report	Try: Copeland 34' m Smith 51' c Con: Halfpenny (1/2); Pen: Halfpenny (3/3) 11', 38', 57'; Cards: Copeland (yellow card)	Attendance: 12,948; Referee: Giuseppe Vivarini (FIR)
Ulster lineup: 1. Callum Black, 2. Rory Best, 3. John Afoa, 4. Johann Muller, 5. Dan Tuohy, 6. Robbie Diack, 7. Chris Henry, 8. Roger Wilson, 9. Ruan Pienaar, 10. Paddy Jackson, 11. Tommy Bowe, 12. Luke Marshall, 13. Jared Payne, 14. Andrew Trimble, 15. Stuart Olding.; Replacements: 16. Rob Herring (for Best), 17. Tom Court (for Black), 18. Ricky Lutton (for Afoa), 19. Lewis Stevenson (for Muller), 20. Mike McComish (for Diack), 21. Paul Marshall, 22. Darren Cave (for L. Marshall), 23. Michael Allen.				Attendance: 12,948; Referee: Giuseppe Vivarini (FIR)

2 November 2013	Scarlets (Wales)	17–9	(Ireland) Ulster	Parc y Scarlets, Llanelli
18:30	Try: Barclay 31' m Pen: S. Shingler (1/1) 23'; A. Thomas (3/3) 40', 64', 77'	Report	Pen: Pienaar (3/5) 9', 45', 69'; Cards: Wilson (yellow card); McIlwaine (yellow card)	Attendance: 6,506; Referee: Alain Rolland (IRFU)
Ulster lineup: 1. Callum Black, 2. Rob Herring, 3. John Afoa, 4. Lewis Stevenson, 5. Neil McComb, 6. Robbie Diack, 7. Roger Wilson, 8. Nick Williams, 9. Paul Marshall, 10. Ruan Pienaar, 11. Andrew Trimble, 12. Chris Farrell, 13. Darren Cave, 14. Michael Allen, 15. Jared Payne.; Replacements: 16. Niall Annett, 17. Kyle McCall, 18. Ricky Lutton, 19. Mike McComish (for McComb), 20. Sean Doyle, 21. James McKinney (for P. Marshall), 22. Ricky Andrew, 23. David McIlwaine (for Allen).				Attendance: 6,506; Referee: Alain Rolland (IRFU)

22 November 2013	(1 BP) Ulster (Ireland)	41–17	(Scotland) Edinburgh	Ravenhill, Belfast
19:05	Try: Gilroy (2) 28' c, 64' c P. Marshall 33' c Diack 61' c McKinney 66' c Con: McKinney (5/5); Pen: McKinney (2/2) 20', 40'	Report	Try: du Preez 15' m Fife 72' m Hart 75' c Con: Leonard (1/3); Cards: Van der Westhuizen (yellow card)	Attendance: 12,955; Referee: Neil Hennessy (WRU)
Ulster lineup: 1. Callum Black, 2. Rob Herring, 3. John Afoa, 4. Lewis Stevenson, 5. Iain Henderson, 6. Robbie Diack, 7. Sean Doyle, 8. Roger Wilson, 9. Paul Marshall, 10. James McKinney, 11. Michael Allen, 12. Luke Marshall, 13. Darren Cave, 14. Andrew Trimble, 15. Craig Gilroy.; Replacements: 16. Niall Annett (for Herring 62'), 17. Tom Court (for Black 59'), 18. Ricky Lutton (for Afoa 66'), 19. Dan Tuohy (for Henderson 18'), 20. Mike McComish (for Stevenson 49'), 21. David Shanahan (for P. Marshall 69'), 22. Peter Nelson (for L. Marshall 69'), 23. Ricky Andrew (for Allen 22').				Attendance: 12,955; Referee: Neil Hennessy (WRU)

30 November 2013	Zebre (Italy)	11–19	(Ireland) Ulster	Stadio XXV Aprile, Parma
15:00	Try: Palazzani 54' m Pen: Garcia (2/2) 9', 16'	Report	Try: Cave 27' c Con: Jackson (1/1); Pen: Jackson (4/5) 11', 23', 48', 51'	Attendance: 1,250; Referee: Andrew McMenemy (SRU)
Ulster lineup: 1. Tom Court, 2. Rob Herring, 3. John Afoa, 4. Neil McComb, 5. Dan Tuohy, 6. Robbie Diack, 7. Mike McComish, 8. Roger Wilson, 9. Paul Marshall, 10. Paddy Jackson, 11. Craig Gilroy, 12. Luke Marshall, 13. Darren Cave, 14. Andrew Trimble, 15. Ricky Andrew.; Replacements: 16. Niall Annett (for Herring 49'), 17. Callum Black (for Court 62'), 18. Declan Fitzpatrick (for Afoa 67'), 19. Conor Joyce, 20. Sean Doyle (for McComish 46'), 21. Michael Heaney (for P. Marshall 78'), 22. James McKinney, 23. Michael Allen (for Trimble 69').				Attendance: 1,250; Referee: Andrew McMenemy (SRU)

20 December 2013	Ulster (Ireland)	13–6	(Italy) Zebre (1 BP)	Ravenhill, Belfast
19:05	Try: Payne 30' c Con: Pienaar (1/1); Pen: Pienaar (2/2) 49', 72'	Report	Pen: Orquera (1/2) 4'; Iannone (1/1) 15'	Attendance: 13,937; Referee: Neil Hennessy (WRU)
Ulster lineup: 1. Callum Black, 2. Niall Annett, 3. Ricky Lutton, 4. Johann Muller, 5. Lewis Stevenson, 6. Mike McComish, 7. Sean Doyle, 8. Robbie Diack, 9. Ruan Pienaar, 10. James McKinney, 11. Michael Allen, 12. Paddy Wallace, 13. Jared Payne, 14. Craig Gilroy, 15. Ricky Andrew.; Replacements: 16. Rob Herring (for Annett 57'), 17. Tom Court (for Black 57'), 18. Adam Macklin (for Lutton 76'), 19. Neil McComb (for Stevenson 76'), 20. Conor Joyce (for Diack 76'), 21. Michael Heaney (for McKinney 68'), 22. Peter Nelson (for Gilroy 78'), 23. David McIlwaine (for Wallace 65').				Attendance: 13,937; Referee: Neil Hennessy (WRU)

28 December 2013	Leinster (Ireland)	19–6	(Ireland) Ulster	RDS Arena, Dublin
18:45	Try: Murphy 37' c Con: Gopperth (1/1); Pen: Gopperth (4/6) 4', 50', 57', 62'	Report	Pen: Jackson (2/2) 2', 33'; Cards: Doyle (yellow card)	Attendance: 18,500; Referee: John Lacey (IRFU)
Ulster lineup: 1. Callum Black, 2. Rob Herring, 3. Declan Fitzpatrick, 4. Lewis Stevenson, 5. Dan Tuohy, 6. Robbie Diack, 7. Sean Doyle, 8. Roger Wilson, 9. Paul Marshall, 10. Paddy Jackson, 11. Craig Gilroy, 12. Luke Marshall, 13. Darren Cave, 14. Andrew Trimble, 15. Ricky Andrew.; Replacements: 16. Niall Annett, 17. Tom Court (for Black), 18. Ricky Lutton (for Fitzpatrick), 19. Neil McComb (for Stevenson), 20. Mike McComish (for Doyle), 21. Ruan Pienaar (for P. Marshall), 22. Jared Payne (for L. Marshall), 23. Michael Allen (for R. Andrew).				Attendance: 18,500; Referee: John Lacey (IRFU)

3 January 2014	Ulster (Ireland)	29–19	(Ireland) Munster	Ravenhill, Belfast
19:05	Try: Payne 6' c Cave 37' c Con: Pienaar (2/2); Pen: Pienaar (5/6) 4', 18', 62', 71', 80'	Report	Try: Dineen 40' m Kilcoyne 48' c Coughlan 66' c Con: Keatley (2/3); Cards: O'Connell (yellow card)	Attendance: 13,945; Referee: Alain Rolland (IRFU)
Ulster lineup: 1. Tom Court, 2. Rob Herring, 3. John Afoa, 4. Iain Henderson, 5. Dan Tuohy, 6. Robbie Diack, 7. Chris Henry, 8. Roger Wilson, 9. Ruan Pienaar, 10. Paddy Jackson, 11. Craig Gilroy, 12. Luke Marshall, 13. Darren Cave, 14. Andrew Trimble, 15. Jared Payne.; Replacements: 16. Niall Annett (for Herring), 17. Callum Black (for Court), 18. Declan Fitzpatrick (for Afoa), 19. Lewis Stevenson (for Henderson), 20. Nick Williams (for Wilson), 21. Sean Doyle (for Henry), 22. Paul Marshall, 23. Michael Allen				Attendance: 13,945; Referee: Alain Rolland (IRFU)

7 February 2014	Ulster (Ireland)	10–7	(Wales) Ospreys (1 BP)	Ravenhill, Belfast
19:35	Try: Cave 44' c Con: Pienaar (1/1); Pen: Pienaar (1/2) 24'	Report	Try: Lewis 10' c Con: Davies (1/1)	Attendance: 12,986; Referee: Nigel Owens (WRU)
Ulster lineup: 1. Tom Court, 2. Rob Herring, 3. John Afoa, 4. Johann Muller, 5. Lewis Stevenson, 6. Robbie Diack, 7. Sean Doyle, 8. Roger Wilson, 9. Ruan Pienaar, 10. James McKinney, 11. Michael Allen, 12. Darren Cave, 13. Jared Payne, 14. Craig Gilroy, 15. Ricky Andrew.; Replacements: 16. Niall Annett, 17. Callum Black (for Court), 18. Ricky Lutton, 19. Iain Henderson (for Stevenson), 20. Nick Williams (for Doyle), 21. Paul Marshall (for McKinney), 22. Luke Marshall (for Payne), 23. Rory Scholes (for Allen).				Attendance: 12,986; Referee: Nigel Owens (WRU)

23 February 2014	(1 BP) Benetton Treviso (Italy)	12–14	(Ireland) Ulster	Stadio Comunale di Monigo, Treviso
15:00	Pen: Berquist (4/5) 6', 49', 57', 71'	Report	Try: Cave 11' c Diack 51' c Con: Pienaar (2/2)	Attendance: 2,720; Referee: George Clancy (IRFU)
Ulster lineup: 1. Tom Court, 2. Rob Herring, 3. Ricky Lutton, 4. Johann Muller, 5. Lewis Stevenson, 6. Robbie Diack, 7. Sean Doyle, 8. Roger Wilson, 9. Paul Marshall, 10. Ruan Pienaar, 11. Michael Allen, 12. Luke Marshall, 13. Darren Cave, 14. Craig Gilroy, 15. Jared Payne.; Replacements: 16. Niall Annett, 17. Callum Black (for Court), 18. Adam Macklin, 19. Neil McComb (for Stevenson), 20. Mike McComish (for Doyle), 21. Michael Heaney (for P. Marshall), 22. Ricky Andrew, 23. Rory Scholes (for Allen).				Attendance: 2,720; Referee: George Clancy (IRFU)

28 February 2014	(1 BP) Ulster (Ireland)	38–8	(Wales) Newport Gwent Dragons	Ravenhill, Belfast
19:05	Try: Pienaar 15' c Bowe (2) 24' c, 27' c penalty try 34' c Doyle 46' c Con: Jackson (5/5); Pen: Pienaar (1/1) 3'	Report	Try: Wardle 62' m Pen: R. Jones (1/2) 40'; Cards: Evans (yellow card)	Attendance: 12,960; Referee: Lloyd Linton (SRU)
Ulster lineup: 1. Callum Black, 2. Rob Herring, 3. Ricky Lutton, 4. Johann Muller (c), 5. Iain Henderson, 6. Robbie Diack, 7. Sean Doyle, 8. Roger Wilson, 9. Ruan Pienaar, 10. Paddy Jackson, 11. Rory Scholes, 12. Luke Marshall, 13. Darren Cave, 14. Tommy Bowe, 15. Jared Payne.; Replacements: 16. Niall Annett (for Herring 72'), 17. Tom Court (for Black 68'), 18. Adam Macklin (for Lutton 67'), 19. Lewis Stevenson (for Pienaar 71), 20. Mike McComish (for Jackson 63'), 21. Paul Marshall (for Scholes 26'), 22. Stuart McCloskey (for L. Marshall 21), 23. David McIlwaine (for Bowe 40').				Attendance: 12,960; Referee: Lloyd Linton (SRU)

14 March 2014	(1 BP) Ulster (Ireland)	26–13	(Wales) Scarlets	Ravenhill, Belfast
19:05	Try: Jackson (2) 16' c, 34' c Bowe 18' c Court 80' m Con: Pienaar (3/3)	Report; Match centre	Try: G. Davies 36' c Con: Barkley (1/1); Pen: Barkley (2/3) 33', 62'	Attendance: 14,000; Referee: Neil Hennessy (WRU)
Ulster lineup: 1. Callum Black, 2. Rob Herring, 3. John Afoa, 4. Johann Muller (c), 5. Robbie Diack, 6. Roger Wilson, 7. Sean Doyle, 8. Nick Williams, 9. Ruan Pienaar, 10. Paddy Jackson, 11. Rory Scholes, 12. Stuart McCloskey, 13. Darren Cave, 14. Tommy Bowe, 15. Jared Payne.; Replacements: 16. Niall Annett (for Herring 48'), 17. Tom Court, 18. Ricky Lutton (for Afoa 70'), 19. Lewis Stevenson (for Diack 74'), 20. Stephen Ferris (for Williams 63'); 21. Michael Heaney (for Pienaar 77'), 22. Craig Gilroy (for Bowe 63'), 23. Ricky Andrew (for Scholes 74).				Attendance: 14,000; Referee: Neil Hennessy (WRU)

21 March 2014	(1 BP) Edinburgh (Scotland)	3–9	(Ireland) Ulster	Murrayfield Stadium, Edinburgh
19:45	Pen: Bezuidenhout (1/2) 14'	Report	Pen: Jackson (3/4) 24', 36', 46'; Cards: Henderson (yellow card)	Attendance: 6,333; Referee: John Lacey (IRFU)
Ulster lineup: 1. Tom Court, 2. Rob Herring, 3. John Afoa, 4. Johann Muller (c), 5. Iain Henderson, 6. Stephen Ferris, 7. Sean Doyle, 8. Roger Wilson, 9. Michael Heaney, 10. Paddy Jackson, 11. Craig Gilroy, 12. Luke Marshall, 13. Darren Cave, 14. Tommy Bowe, 15. Jared Payne.; Replacements: 16. Niall Annett, 17. Andrew Warwick, 18. Ricky Lutton (for Afoa 77'), 19. Dan Tuohy (for Doyle 62'), 20. Nick Williams (for Wilson 59'), 21. Robbie Diack (for Ferris 42'), 22. Paul Marshall (for Heaney 62'), 23. Stuart McCloskey.				Attendance: 6,333; Referee: John Lacey (IRFU)

29 March 2014	Cardiff Blues (Wales)	28–23	(Ireland) Ulster (1 BP)	Cardiff Arms Park
18:30	Try: Copeland 36' c Con: G. Davies (1/1); Pen: G. Davies (7/7) 13', 26', 30', 33', 39', 65', 79'	Report; Match centre	Try: Cave 3' m Pen: Jackson (6/6) 43', 47', 57', 67', 72', 75'; Cards: Ferris (yellow card)	Attendance: 7,084; Referee: Marius Mitrea (FIR)
Ulster lineup: 1. Tom Court, 2. Rob Herring, 3. John Afoa, 4. Johann Muller (c), 5. Dan Tuohy, 6. Stephen Ferris, 7. Chris Henry, 8. Nick Williams, 9. Michael Heaney, 10. Paddy Jackson, 11. Andrew Trimble, 12. Luke Marshall, 13. Darren Cave, 14. Tommy Bowe, 15. Jared Payne.; Replacements: 16. Niall Annett (for Herring 69'), 17. Andrew Warwick (for Court 67'), 18. Ricky Lutton, 19. Iain Henderson (for Muller 57'), 20. Robbie Diack (for Ferris 41'), 21. Sean Doyle, 22. Paul Marshall (for Heaney 57), 23. Craig Gilroy.				Attendance: 7,084; Referee: Marius Mitrea (FIR)

11 April 2014	(1 BP) Ulster (Ireland)	58–12	(Ireland) Connacht	Ravenhill, Belfast
19:05	Try: P. Marshall (2) 5' m, 25' c Trimble (3) 16' m, 42' c, 59' c Bowe 23' c L. Marshall 48' c Gilroy 68' c Con: Jackson (5/7); McKinney (1/1); Pen: Jackson (2/2) 12', 40'	Report; Match centre	Try: McSharry 8' m Leader 62' c Con: Nikora (1/1); Cards: Swift (yellow card)	Attendance: 13,948; Referee: Ian Davies (WRU)
Ulster lineup: 1. Andrew Warwick, 2. Rob Herring, 3. Ricky Lutton, 4. Johann Muller (c), 5. Iain Henderson, 6. Robbie Diack, 7. Chris Henry, 8. Nick Williams, 9. Paul Marshall, 10. Paddy Jackson, 11. Craig Gilroy, 12. Luke Marshall, 13. Tommy Bowe, 14. Andrew Trimble, 15. Ricky Andrew.; Replacements: 16. Niall Annett (for Herring), 17. Tom Court (for Warwick), 18. Adam Macklin (for Lutton), 19. Lewis Stevenson (for Henry 59'), 20. Sean Doyle (for Diack 9'), 21. Michael Heaney, 22. James McKinney (for Jackson 61'), 23. Stuart McCloskey (for L. Marshall 53').				Attendance: 13,948; Referee: Ian Davies (WRU)

18 April 2014	Glasgow Warriors (Scotland)	27–9	(Ireland) Ulster	Scotstoun Stadium, Glasgow
19:35	Try: Maitland 40' c Seymour 48' c Bennett 67' c Con: Russell (3/3); Pen: Russell (2/2) 9', 43'; Cards: Wilson (yellow card)	Report	Pen: Jackson (3/5) 21', 25', 28'; Cards: Doyle (yellow card)	Attendance: 7,417; Referee: John Lacey (IRFU)
Ulster lineup: 1. Tom Court, 2. Rob Herring, 3. Ricky Lutton, 4. Johann Muller (c), 5. Iain Henderson, 6. Chris Henry, 7. Sean Doyle, 8. Nick Williams, 9. Paul Marshall, 10. Paddy Jackson, 11. Andrew Trimble, 12. Luke Marshall, 13. Darren Cave, 14. Tommy Bowe, 15. Ricky Andrew.; Replacements: 16. Niall Annett (for Herring), 17. Andrew Warwick (for Court), 18. Declan Fitzpatrick (for Lutton), 19. Lewis Stevenson (for Muller), 20. Mike McComish (for Doyle), 21. Michael Heaney (for P. Marshall), 22. James McKinney, 23. Craig Gilroy (for L. Marshall 53').				Attendance: 7,417; Referee: John Lacey (IRFU)

2 May 2014	(1 BP) Ulster (Ireland)	20–22	(Ireland) Leinster	Ravenhill, Belfast
19:30	Try: Jackson 24' m Pen: Jackson (5/5) 34', 58', 68', 73', 78'	Report; Match centre	Try: Jennings 59' c Con: Madigan (1/1); Pen: Madigan (4/7) 6', 12', 36', 53'; Gopperth (1/1) 70'; Cards: Kearney (yellow card); Ruddock (yellow card)	Attendance: 16,950; Referee: Luke Pearce (RFU)
Ulster lineup: 1. Tom Court, 2. Rob Herring, 3. Andrew Warwick, 4. Johann Muller (c), 5. Iain Henderson, 6. Roger Wilson, 7. Chris Henry, 8. Nick Williams, 9. Paul Marshall, 10. Paddy Jackson, 11. Tommy Bowe, 12. Luke Marshall, 13. Jared Payne, 14. Andrew Trimble, 15. Ricky Andrew.; Replacements: 16. Niall Annett, 17. Callum Black (for Williams 19'), 18. Adam Macklin (for Warwick 70), 19. Dan Tuohy (for Muller 63), 20. Sean Doyle, 21. Michael Heaney, 22. James McKinney, 23. Darren Cave (for L. Marshall 57').				Attendance: 16,950; Referee: Luke Pearce (RFU)

10 May 2014	(1 BP) Munster (Ireland)	17–19	(Ireland) Ulster	Thomond Park, Limerick
18:30	Try: Williams 14' c Dougall 49' c Con: Keatley (2/2); Pen: Keatley (1/1) 11'	Report; Video	Try: Heaney 17' c Con: McKinney (1/1); Pen: McKinney (4/4) 36', 47', 53', 65'	Attendance: 16,436; Referee: Nigel Owens (WRU)
Ulster lineup: 1. Callum Black, 2. Rob Herring, 3. Andrew Warwick, 4. Lewis Stevenson, 5. Dan Tuohy, 6. Mike McComish, 7. Sean Doyle, 8. Nick Williams, 9. Michael Heaney, 10. James McKinney, 11. Rory Scholes, 12. Stuart McCloskey, 13. Michael Allen, 14. David McIlwaine, 15. Craig Gilroy.; Replacements: 16. Kyle McCall (for Herring), 17. Bronson Ross, 18. Adam Macklin (for Warwick), 19. Neil McComb (for Tuohy), 20. Conor Joyce (for Williams), 21. David Shanahan (for Heaney), 22. Ricky Andrew, 23. Peter Nelson (for Scholes).				Attendance: 16,436; Referee: Nigel Owens (WRU)

=== Semi-final ===
17 May 2014	Leinster (Ireland)	13–9	(Ireland) Ulster	RDS Arena, Dublin
19:00	Try: Madigan 72' c Con: Gopperth (1/1); Pen: Gopperth (2/2) 58', 64'; Cards: D'Arcy (yellow card)	Report; Video	Pen: Jackson (3/3) 7', 40', 53'	Attendance: 18,246; Referee: Leighton Hodges (WRU)
Ulster lineup: 1. Callum Black, 2. Rory Best, 3. Ricky Lutton, 4. Johann Muller, 5. Iain Henderson, 6. Robbie Diack, 7. Chris Henry, 8. Roger Wilson, 9. Ruan Pienaar, 10. Paddy Jackson, 11. Andrew Trimble, 12. Darren Cave, 13. Jared Payne, 14. Tommy Bowe, 15. Craig Gilroy.; Replacements: 16. Rob Herring, 17. Andrew Warwick (for Black), 18. Adam Macklin, 19. Dan Tuohy (for Muller), 20. Sean Doyle (for Henry), 21. Paul Marshall, 22. James McKinney (for Jackson), 23. Luke Marshall (for Cave).				Attendance: 18,246; Referee: Leighton Hodges (WRU)

=== End-of-season awards ===
Ulster and Connacht jointly won the Fair Play award. Wing Andrew Trimble and lock Johann Muller were named in the Pro12 Dream Team.

== Home attendance ==
Domestic League					European Cup					Total	
League	Fixtures	Average Attendance	Highest	Lowest	League	Fixtures	Average Attendance	Highest	Lowest	Total Attendance	Average Attendance
2013–14 Pro12	11	13,348	16,950	10,693	2013–14 Heineken Cup	4	14,464	16,853	12,977	204,678	13,645

== Friendlies ==
23 August 2013	Ulster (Ireland)	21-19	(Ireland) Leinster	Ravenhill, Belfast
	Try: Payne; Williams; Porter; Con: McKinney (3)	Report	Try: Ryan; Con: Gopperth; Pen: Gopperth (4)
Ulster lineup: 1. Kyle McCall, 2. Niall Annett, 3. Declan Fitzpatrick, 4. Lewis Stevenson, 5. Neil McComb, 6. Mike McComish, 7. Sean Doyle, 8. Nick Williams, 9. Michael Heaney, 10. James McKinney, 11. Michael Allen, 12. Chris Farrell, 13. Jared Payne (c), 14. Rory Scholes, 15. Peter Nelson.; Replacements: 16. Callum Black, 17. Jonny Murphy, 18. Bronson Ross, 19. Alan O'Connor, 20. Dan Tuohy, 21. Robbie Diack, 22. Robbie Diack, 23. Ian Porter, 24. Chris Cochrane, 25. Luke Marshall, 26. David McIlwaine, 27. Ricky Andrew.

31 August 2013	Leicester Tigers (England)	30-10	(Ireland) Ulster	Welford Road Stadium, Leicester
	Try: Morris; Mélé; Allen; De Chaves; Con: Lamb (2); Pen: Lamb (2)	Report	Try: Henry; Con: Jackson; Pen: McKinney
Ulster lineup: 1. Tom Court, 2. Rob Herring, 3. Ricky Lutton, 4. Johann Muller (c), 5. Dan Tuohy, 6. Robbie Diack, 7. Chris Henry, 8. Roger Wilson, 9. Paul Marshall, 10. James McKinney, 11. David McIlwaine, 12. Chris Farrell, 13. Luke Marshall, 14. Andrew Trimble, 15. Jared Payne.; Replacements: Callum Black, Niall Annett, Declan Fitzpatrick, Alan O'Connor, Conor Joyce, Lewis Stevenson, Mike McComish, Sean Doyle, Ian Porter, Paddy Jackson, Michael Allen, Ricky Andrew.

== Ulster Women ==
=== 2013-14 Women's Interprovincial Series ===
	Team	P	W	D	L	PF	PA	BP	Pts
1	Leinster	3	3	0	0	98	13	0	12
2	Munster	3	2	0	1	58	45	1	9
3	Ulster	3	0	1	2	14	56	2	4
4	Connacht	3	0	1	2	17	73	2	4

30 November 2013	Ulster	7-41	Leinster	Ravenhill, Belfast

8 December 2013	Munster	15-7	Ulster	Ard Gaoithe, Clonmel

15 December 2013	Ulster	0-0	Connacht	Upper Malone, Belfast

== Ulster Rugby Awards ==
The Ulster Rugby Awards ceremony was held at the Europa Hotel, Belfast, on 5 May 2014. Winners were:

- Bank of Ireland Ulster Player of the Year: Andrew Trimble
- Heineken Ulster Rugby Personality of the Year: Johann Muller
- BT Young Player of the Year: Paddy Jackson
- Rugby Writers Player of the Year: Andrew Trimble
- Ulster Rugby Supporters Club Player of the Year: Andrew Trimble
- Abbey Insurance Academy Player of the Year: Stuart McCloskey
- Ulster Carpets Youth Player of the Year: Adam McBurney
- Danske Bank Ulster Schools Player of the Year: Jacob Stockdale, Wallace High
