= Luke Marshall =

Ireland international rugby union player (born 1991)

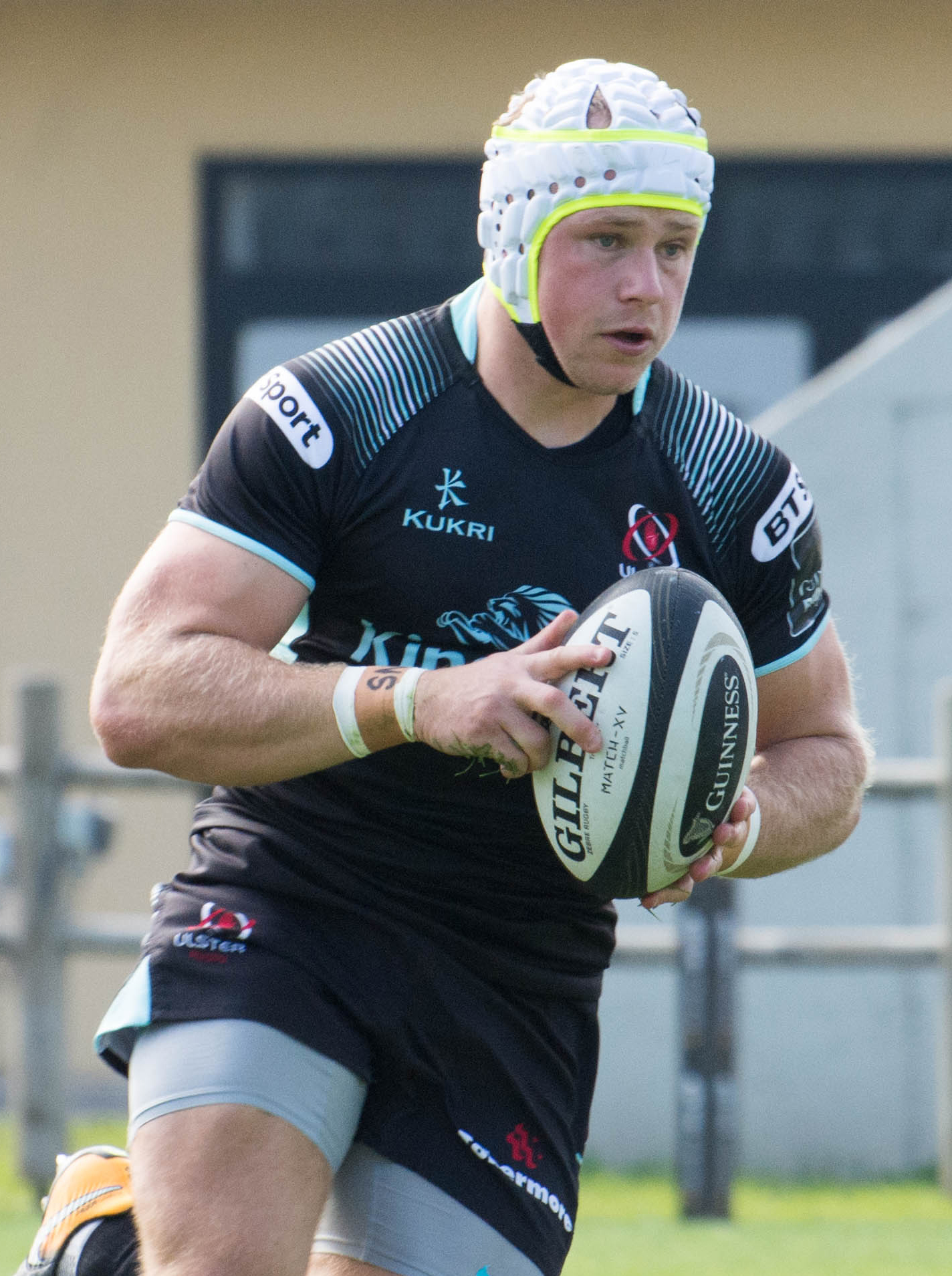
- Born: Luke Marshall; 3 March 1991 (age 35) Ballymena, Northern Ireland
- Height: 1.8 m (5 ft 11 in)
- Weight: 92 kg (14 st 7 lb; 203 lb)
- School: Ballymena Academy

Rugby union career
- Position: Centre
- Current team: Ulster
Amateur team(s)
Years	Team	Apps	(Points)
- Ballymena
Senior career
Years	Team	Apps	(Points)
2010–2024	Ulster	175	(152)
- Correct as of 26 April 2024
International career
Years	Team	Apps	(Points)
2010–11	Ireland U20	6	(10)
2013–2017	Ireland	11	(15)
- Correct as of 15 May 2022

Luke Marshall (born 3 March 1991) is an Irish former rugby union player, who played centre for Ulster, and won 11 caps for Ireland, the last coming in 2017.

== Ulster Rugby ==
While in the Ulster academy, he played in an exhibition match between an Ulster-Leinster team against a Munster-Connacht team that opened the Aviva Stadium in August 2010. In the 2010–11 season, he made seven appearances, including three starts, and scored a try. The following season he made seven more appearances, including two starts and scored one try. In 2012–13 he made 18 appearances, including 10 starts, and made his debut in the Heineken Cup. He played in a non-cap Ireland XV that defeated Fiji 53–0 in November 2012. He was named 2012–13 Pro12 Young Player of the Season, and in the Pro12 Dream Team. In 2013–14 he made 26 appearances for Ulster, including 24 starts, and scored six tries. He missed much of the 2014–15 season, suffering a knee injury in October 2014 and a concussion in January 2015, and being suspended for five matches after being cited for kicking an opponent in March 2015. In 2015–16 he made 21 appearances, including 20 starts, and scored four tries. In 2016–17 he made 22 appearances, including 19 starts, and scored seven tries, with 30 defenders beaten, 155 tackles and 10 turnovers won. He made his 100th appearance for the province in April 2017. In 2017–18 he made 16 appearances, including 12 starts, six turnovers and three try assists, but suffered an anterior cruciate ligament injury in May 2018 that kept him out for most of the 2018–19 season. In 2019–20 he made 16 appearances, all starts, and scored three tries. A knee injury sustained in November 2020 that kept him out for almost 18 months. He returned to action in March 2022.

In April 2024 Marshall announced that he would retire from professional rugby at the end of the season after a 15 year career. He was named Uster's personality the year for the 2023-24 season in the 2024 Ulster Rugby Awards.

== Ireland ==
He played for Ireland at under-20 level in the 2011 Six Nations Under 20s Championship and the 2011 IRB Junior World Championship. He won his first senior international cap on 24 February 2013, starting in the defeat against Scotland in the 2013 Six Nations Championship. He played for Ireland against Australia in November 2013, in two matches in the 2014 Six Nations Championship, and against Argentina in June 2014. He played twice in Ireland's tour of South Africa in June 2016. He appeared for Ireland against Canada in November 2016, and against the USA and Japan in June 2017.
