= Stuart McCloskey =

Irish rugby union player (born 1992)

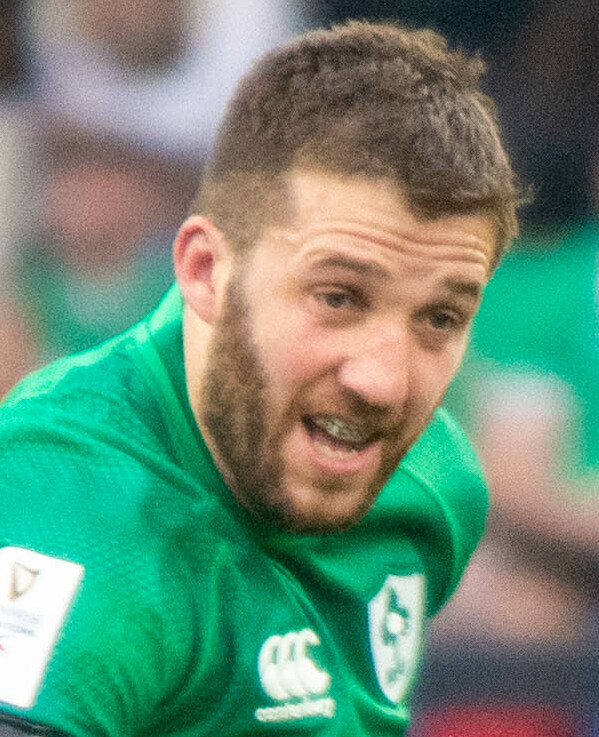
- McCloskey in the Six Nations Championship
- Born: 6 August 1992 (age 34) Bangor, County Down
- Height: 1.93 m (6 ft 4 in)
- Weight: 117 kg (258 lb; 18 st 6 lb)
- School: Bangor Grammar School
- University: Queens University Belfast

Rugby union career
- Position: Centre
- Current team: Ulster
Amateur team(s)
Years	Team	Apps	(Points)
- Dungannon
- Correct as of 5 May 2023
Senior career
Years	Team	Apps	(Points)
2014–	Ulster	221	(209)
- Correct as of 24 October 2026
International career
Years	Team	Apps	(Points)
2014–2015	Emerging Ireland	4	(5)
2016–	Ireland	34	(25)
- Correct as of 21 November 2026

Stuart McCloskey (born 6 August 1992) is an Ireland rugby union player who plays as a centre for United Rugby Championship club Ulster and the Ireland national team.

He has been Rugby Players Ireland players' player of the year, Ulster's player of the year three times, and has twice been named on the Pro14 Dream Team, and once on the United Rugby Championship Elite XV. He is described as "a true cornerstone of this Ulster team, providing a rounded skillset at inside centre that includes strong ball-carrying, offloading, short and long passing, a breakdown threat, defensive communication, and even attacking kicking".

== Early life ==
He grew up in Bangor in the north of County Down, where his father, Wilson McCloskey, owned a landscaping business and played fullback for Ards RFC. McCloskey played rugby at Bangor Grammar School, but was not selected for any age-grade representative sides and was not on Ulster's radar until he joined Dungannon RFC in the All-Ireland League after leaving school. Dungannon coach Kieran Campbell promoted him to the first team and recommended him to Ulster's academy manager, Allen Clarke, who asked him to join the sub-academy. He combined playing for Dungannon and games for Ulster "A" with studying structural engineering with architecture at Queens University Belfast, until he joined the full academy before the 2013–14 season.

== Professional career ==
He made four appearances in the senior team in the 2013-14 season, and was named academy player of the year at the 2014 Ulster Rugby Awards. He played for Emerging Ireland (effectively the third XV of the Irish rugby team) at the 2014 IRB Nations Cup in June 2014. He signed a development contract ahead of the 2014–15 season, during which he made fifteen appearances, including nine starts, and won Ulster's Young Player of the Year award. He was part of the Emerging Ireland team that won the Tbilisi Cup in June 2015.

In 2015–16 he made 23 appearances for Ulster, including 21 starts, scoring four tries and making 186 tackles, won his first senior cap for Ireland against England in the 2016 Six Nations Championship, and was named Ulster's Player of the Year. In 2016–17 he made sixteen appearances, including thirteen starts, and scored two tries for Ulster, and has five caps for Ireland. In 2017–18 season he made 24 appearances, all starts, scored seven tries, and made four try assists, 213 tackles and 14 turnovers. He won his second cap for Ireland against Fiji in the 2017 end-of-year rugby union internationals.

In 2018–19 he made 26 appearances, including 25 starts, scored four tries, made 232 tackles, and won 18 turnovers. He made his 100th appearance for Ulster in February 2019. He made his third Ireland cap, scoring a try, against the USA in the 2018 end-of-year rugby union internationals. At the end of the season he was named in the 2018–19 Pro14 Dream Team, and won Player of the Year and Supporters Club Player of the Year at the Ulster Rugby Awards. In 2019–20 he made 17 appearances, all starts, and scored three tries. He was named on the Pro14 Dream Team for the second year running. In 2020–21 he made 15 appearances, all starts, scored two tries, made 121 tackles and 13 turnovers, and carried 171 times with 40 defenders beaten and five clean breaks. He played for Ireland against Georgia in the 2020 end-of-year internationals, and against Japan and the USA in July 2021. In the 2021–22 season he has made 15 appearances, all starts, and scored three tries. He made his 150th appearance for Ulster in March 2022. He started all three of Ireland three tests in the 2022 end-of-year internationals, and was named in the Irish 6 nations squad for 2023 on the 19 January 2023. He started in Ireland's 34-10 victory over Wales in the opening week. He was called up to the Ireland squad for their two-match tour of South Africa in July 2024.

He made his 200th appearance for Ulster in a home win against the Stormers in March 2025. McCloskey featured in Ireland's record 106-7 win over Portugal on 12 July 2025, scoring the opening try in the first minute.

He was one of only two Ireland players who played every minute of all five matches of the 2026 Six Nations Championship, after which Ireland coach Andy Farrell said "He should definitely be in the running for player of the tournament." He made the most "dominant contact" collisions (18), and was joint top in try assists (6) and turnovers won (8), and led Ireland in carries (74), offloads (8), defenders beaten (20) and post-contact metres (105). Farrell hailed his try-saving cover tackle tackle on Marcus Smith in the win against England as a defining moment. He was named Men's 15s Player of the Year at the 2026 Rugby Players Ireland awards, and the Ulster Men's Player of the Year (for the third time) and Supporters' Club Player of the Year (for the second time) at the 2026 Ulster Rugby Awards. He was named at inside centre in the URC Elite XV.

McCloskey tries not to get too psyched up for big matches, preferring to conserve nervous energy for the day.

== Honours ==
=== Ireland ===
- 2x Six Nations Championship: 2023, 2024
- 1× Grand Slam: 2023
- 2× Triple Crown: 2023, 2026

=== Rugby Players Ireland Awards ===
- Men's 15s Players' Player of the Year 2026

=== Ulster Rugby Awards ===
- Academy Player of the Year 2014
- Young Player of the Year 2015
- Player of the Year 2016, 2019, 2026
- Supporters' Club Player of the Year 2019, 2026
- Rugby Writers' Player of the Year 2023

=== Others ===
- Pro14/URC team of the year 2018-19, 2019-20, 2025-26
