= Nick Williams (rugby union) =

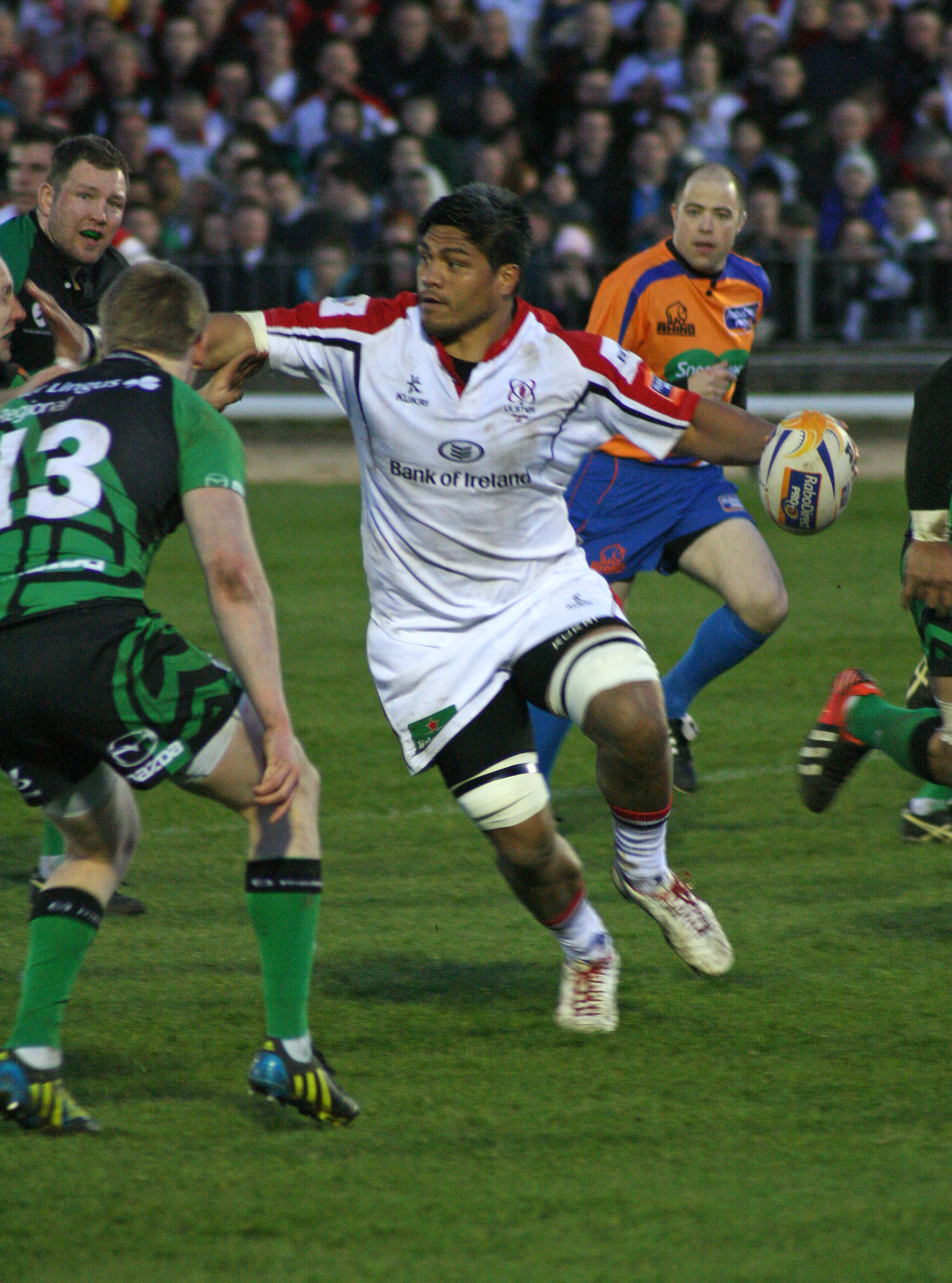
- Born: 2 December 1983 (age 42) Auckland, New Zealand
- Height: 1.91 m (6 ft 3 in)
- Weight: 130 kg (20 st; 290 lb)
- Notable relative(s): Tim Nanai-Williams (brother); Sonny Bill Williams (cousin); Joseph Parker (cousin)

Rugby union career
- Position: Number 8
Senior career
Years	Team	Apps	(Points)
2008–2010	Munster	19	(20)
2010–2012	Aironi	34	(50)
2012–2016	Ulster	76	(80)
2016–2020	Cardiff Blues	77	(65)
- Correct as of 29 August 2020
Provincial / State sides
Years	Team	Apps	(Points)
2004–2008	North Harbour	33	(40)
Super Rugby
Years	Team	Apps	(Points)
2004–2008	Blues	37	(20)
International career
Years	Team	Apps	(Points)
2005–2006	Junior All Blacks	4	(15)
- Correct as of 27 January 2013

Nick Williams (born 2 December 1983) is a retired rugby union player. A number 8, Williams played for North Harbour and the Blues in his native New Zealand, before moving to Europe and playing for Munster, Aironi, Ulster and Cardiff Blues before retiring in 2020.

== Career ==
Williams initially played rugby league, changing to rugby union in his late teens. He then progressed to play for North Harbour as well as representing New Zealand in Under 21's. He then went on to play for the Blues in the Super 14, and was selected for the Junior All Blacks.

Williams played for Munster in the Celtic League and Heineken Cup for two seasons. He made 19 appearances for Munster and scored four tries, including a hat-trick against the Newport Gwent Dragons. He joined Aironi on a one-year deal for the 2010–11 season.

On 22 June 2012, Williams signed for Ulster on a two-year deal after leaving Aironi. On the signing, David Humphreys the Ulster Director of Rugby, said Williams would add a great deal to the Ulster squad. On 23 December 2015, Williams would join Welsh team Cardiff Blues on a three-year contract from the 2016–17 season. Williams retired from rugby in August 2020.

== Honours ==
Munster

- Celtic League (1): 2008–09

Cardiff Blues

- European Rugby Challenge Cup (1): 2017–18

Junior All Blacks

- Pacific Nations Cup (1): 2006

Individual

- Pro12 Player of the Season (1): 2012–13
- IRUPA Players' Player of the Year (1): 2013

== Personal life ==
As one of eight children, Nick grew up in Grey Lynn, Auckland. Williams is the older brother of Clermont Auvergene back Tim Nanai-Williams. He is the first cousin of Blues centre Sonny Bill Williams and the second cousin of boxer Joseph Parker.
