= Peter Nelson (rugby union) =

Canada international rugby union player

- Born: Peter Nelson; 5 October 1992 (age 34) Dungannon, Northern Ireland
- Height: 1.83 m (6 ft 0 in)
- Weight: 99 kg (15 st 8 lb)
- School: Royal School Dungannon

Rugby union career
- Position: Fullback
- Current team: Toronto Arrows
Amateur team(s)
Years	Team	Apps	(Points)
20-2011	Dungannon RFC		
Senior career
Years	Team	Apps	(Points)
2020	Seattle Seawolves	0	(0)
2020–2021	US Bressane	11	(59)
2021–2022	Aurillac	16	(7)
2023	Toronto Arrows	8	(16)
- Correct as of 7 July 2025
Provincial / State sides
Years	Team	Apps	(Points)
2011–2019	Ulster	60	(47)
- Correct as of 15 January 2024
International career
Years	Team	Apps	(Points)
2010	Ireland under-18		
2012	Ireland under-20	5	(10)
2013–2015	Emerging Ireland	3	(0)
2019–	Canada	35	(222)
- Correct as of 23 November 2025

Peter Nelson (born 5 October 1992) from Dungannon is a Northern Irish-born rugby union player. He formerly played at the position of fullback for Ulster. He last played professionally for the Toronto Arrows in Major League Rugby (MLR).

Nelson is a versatile back who can play at out-half, full-back, centre or wing.

== Club career ==
Nelson made his debut for Ulster against Leinster in December 2011. He scored his first try for Ulster against Benetton Treviso in November 2012.

In May 2019, it was announced that Nelson would be leaving Ulster after eight seasons.

In 2020, Nelson agreed a deal with Seattle Seawolves to play in Major League Rugby, however that move was abandoned due to the coronavirus pandemic.

== International career ==
=== Ireland ===
Nelson has represented Ireland at both under-18 and under-20 level.

=== Canada ===
In June 2019, Nelson was selected by Canada for the Pacific Nations Cup. He is eligible for Canada through his Vancouver-born grandmother. He made his Canada debut in the tournament against the USA Eagles.

He was named in the Canada squad for the 2019 World Cup and made his tournament debut against Italy on 26 September.
