= Kyle McCall =

Irish rugby union player (born 1992)

- Born: 2 January 1992 (age 34) Belfast, Northern Ireland
- Height: 1.75 m (5 ft 9 in)
- Weight: 111 kg (17 st 7 lb; 245 lb)
- School: Wallace High School

Rugby union career
- Position: Prop
Provincial / State sides
Years	Team	Apps	(Points)
2013–2021	Ulster	86	(10)
- Correct as of 6 June 2021
International career
Years	Team	Apps	(Points)
2012	Ireland U20	12	(20)

Kyle McCall (born 2 January 1992) is an Irish former rugby union player who played prop for Ulster.

McCall attended Wallace High School, Lisburn, and nominated for Ulster Schools Player of the Year in May 2010. he joined the Ulster academy before the 2010–11 season. He made his senior debut for Ulster in 2013 in an away win against Leinster, and joined the senior squad in 2014. He played nine seasons with Ulster, making 86 appearances and scored two tries, and was released in 2021. He played club rugby for Ballynahinch until 2024, when he retired due to injury.

His younger brother Zack was also an Ireland under-20 international and part of the Ulster academy as a hooker. He graduated to the senior Ulster squad in 2019, but was released in 2020 without making a senior appearance.
