= Jared Payne =

British & Irish Lions & Ireland international rugby union player

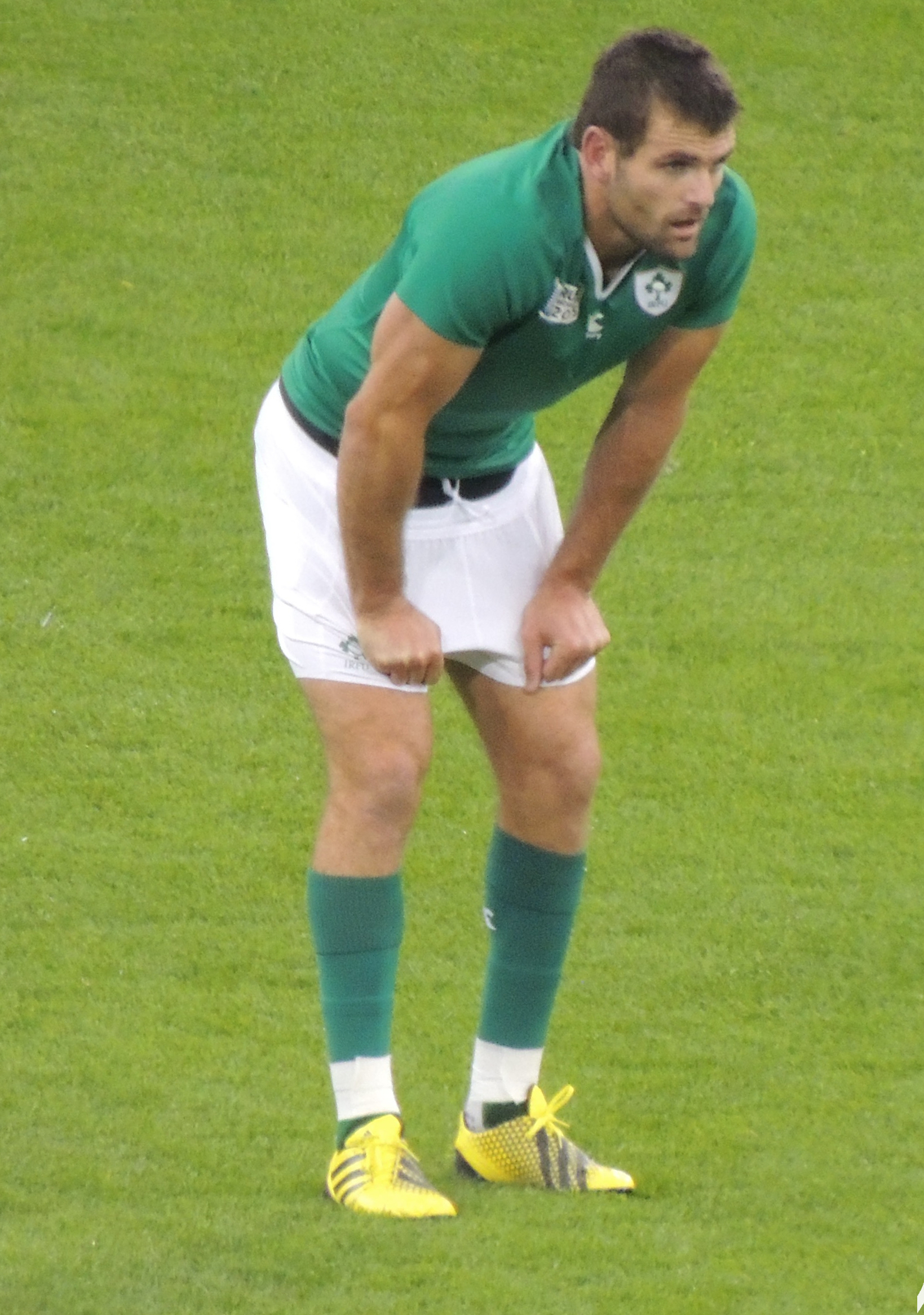
- Payne playing for Ireland at the 2015 Rugby World Cup
- Born: Jared Benjamin Payne; 13 October 1985 (age 41) Tauranga, New Zealand
- Height: 1.88 m (6 ft 2 in)
- Weight: 95 kg (14 st 13 lb)
- School: Nelson College; Hamilton Boys' High School

Rugby union career
- Position: Centre / Fullback
Amateur team(s)
Years	Team	Apps	(Points)
2003–2004	Hamilton Old Boys RSC		
Senior career
Years	Team	Apps	(Points)
2011–2018	Ulster	78	(105)
Provincial / State sides
Years	Team	Apps	(Points)
2006–2007	Waikato	7	(5)
2008–2011	Northland	36	(96)
- Correct as of 31 August 2011
Super Rugby
Years	Team	Apps	(Points)
2007	Chiefs	3	(0)
2009–2010	Crusaders	22	(10)
2011	Blues	18	(35)
International career
Years	Team	Apps	(Points)
2006	New Zealand U21	3	(5)
2014–2017	Ireland	20	(20)
2017	British & Irish Lions	0	(0)
Coaching career
- Years: Team
- 2018–2022: Ulster (defence)
- 2022-2023: Clermont Auvergne (defence)
- 2023: Scarlets (backs/attack)

Jared Benjamin Payne (born 13 October 1985) is a former rugby union centre who played for Ulster and the Ireland national team. He was a member of the 2017 British & Irish Lions tour to New Zealand, but did not play a test match. On his retirement from playing in 2018, he took over as Ulster's defence coach, a position he left at the end of the 2021-22 season. Since 2022 he has been defence coach for Clermont Auvergne.

Payne was born in Tauranga, New Zealand, and represented New Zealand at U21 and 7s level, as well as captaining his provincial side Northland. He began his Super Rugby career with the Chiefs in 2007 before moving to the Crusaders in 2009. He made 22 appearances for the Crusaders over two seasons. He moved to the Blues for the 2011 Super Rugby campaign and was one of the standout players in the competition as he played centre and fullback with flair. Payne played most of his New Zealand rugby at centre and fullback, but also covered the wing.

== Early life ==
Payne was born in Tauranga on 13 October 1985. He was educated at Nelson College in 1999, and then Hamilton Boys' High School.

== Professional career ==
=== New Zealand ===
Between 2006 and 2007 Payne played for Waikato, and from 2008 until 2011 played for Northland, whom he captained from 2009 til 2011.

Payne debuted with the Waikato Chiefs in 2007, however his game time was limited and he was not re-signed for the 2008 season. In 2009, Payne was signed by the Crusaders, for whom he made 22 appearances in the 2009 and 2010 seasons. In 2010 it was announced the Blues had signed him for the 2011 Super Rugby season.

=== Ulster Rugby ===
In 2011, Payne signed with Ulster, making his Ulster debut on 16 September against the Cardiff Blues, where he made a solid start for his new team. Payne injured his Achilles tendon in a match against Treviso in October 2011 keeping him out for the rest of the season. He returned for the start of the 2012/13 season and his flair and dynamic play made him one of Ulster's key playmakers in their run to the Heineken Cup Quarter-Finals and Pro12 Finals. He signed a new contract with Ulster in May 2013, keeping him at Ravenhill until 2016. He signed a new contract with Ulster in May 2016, keeping him at Ravenhill until 2018. Payne was forced to retire in May 2018 due to head injury sustained during the 2017 Lions tour, though Ulster announced him as their new defence coach.

=== Clermont Auvergne ===
In January 2022 it was announced that Payne would be leaving Ulster at the end of the season, with Clermont Auvergne announcing he would join as defence coach the following season. In January 2023, Payne took interim charge of Clermont Auvergne following the removal of Jono Gibbes as head coach.

== International career ==
=== Representative rugby ===
Payne played for the New Zealand Under-21s and Schools sevens teams.

Payne played his first test for Ireland against South Africa on 8 November 2014.

=== British & Irish Lions ===
Payne was selected as part of the 2017 British & Irish Lions squad to take part in their tour of New Zealand. He started in three of the matches on tour, including fixtures against his former teams the Blues and Chiefs. Payne scored a try in the second half against the Chiefs but was subbed off with a concussion in the 76th minute. Payne withdrew from the squad in the following days and this proved to be his last game of rugby, as he retired following this serious head injury.
