= Rory Scholes =

- Born: 24 April 1993 (age 33) Belfast, Northern Ireland
- Height: 1.86 m (6 ft 1 in)
- Weight: 95 kg (15.0 st; 209 lb)
- School: Campbell College
- University: Ulster University

Rugby union career
- Position: Wing
Amateur team(s)
Years	Team	Apps	(Points)
2011–2016	Belfast Harlequins		
2016–2017	Gala		
Senior career
Years	Team	Apps	(Points)
2013–2016	Ulster	26	(25)
2016–2017	Edinburgh	11	(10)
2017–2018	Connacht	5	(0)
2018–2020	Brive	17	(10)
- Correct as of 5 December 2019
International career
Years	Team	Apps	(Points)
2010–2011	Ireland U18		
2013	Ireland U20	10	(33)
- Correct as of 5 December 2019

Rory Scholes (born 24 April 1993) is an Irish rugby union player. He plays primarily as a wing, but also covers fullback. Scholes last played for Brive. He has previously played for his native province of Ulster, Scottish side Edinburgh and another Irish provincial side Connacht in the Pro14.

== Early life ==
Scholes was born in Belfast. He was educated at Campbell College in city, and played rugby with the school side. Scholes was part of the team that were runners-up to The Royal School in the Schools Shield in 2010. The following year, he was part of the side that won the 2011 Ulster Schools' Cup. Campbell beat Royal Belfast Academical Institution 18–11 in the final, with Scholes kicking eight of their points. Among his teammates on the schools team was future Irish international Chris Farrell. Scholes has a sports science degree from Ulster University, which he studied for while in the Ulster Rugby academy.

== Club career ==
=== Ulster ===
Scholes joined the Ulster academy ahead of the 2011–12 season. During his first two seasons in the academy, he primarily played for his club side Belfast Harlequins and the province's second-tier side, the Ulster Ravens. In February 2014, Scholes made his senior debut for the team away to the Ospreys in the 2013–14 Pro12, and made a further four appearances in the league that season.

Scholes signed a senior contract with Ulster ahead of the 2014–15 season, and made four appearances in that year's league. The following season saw him play much more regularly for the first team, however. Scholes featured in 12 of the team's 2015–16 Pro12 games, starting nine of them, and scored his first try for the team against Scarlets on 12 September 2015. He also made his European debut against Toulouse in the Champions Cup and played in five of Ulster's six matches in the tournament. However, with the impending arrival of New Zealand fullback Charles Piutau in the summer, Scholes decided to leave Ulster after his breakthrough season.

=== Edinburgh ===
It was announced in March 2017 that Scholes had signed a two-year deal with Scottish side Edinburgh. The move to Edinburgh also saw him join amateur side Gala in the Scottish Borders. Scholes made his Edinburgh debut against Cardiff Blues on 9 September 2016. He made a total of eight appearances in the 2016–17 Pro12, scoring two tries, and also played twice in the 2016–17 Challenge Cup. In July 2017, it was announced that Scholes would leave the club with one year left to run on his deal.

=== Connacht ===
In August 2017, Irish province Connacht announced that they had signed Scholes ahead of the 2017–18 season. He made his debut for the team in their Pro14 game against Dragons on 15 September 2017. After just three appearances Scholes had to have his appendix removed in November that year, leading to lengthy absence.

== International career ==
Scholes has represented Ireland internationally at under-age level. He was part of the Ireland under-18 schools team in 2010 and 2011, on the back of his performances for Campbell College. In 2013, he was part of the Ireland under-20 side. Scholes featured in four of the team's five games in the 2013 Six Nations Under 20s Championship, playing the full 80 minutes each time and scoring a total of 13 points. In May 2013, he was named in the squad for the Junior World Championship in France. Scholes played in all five of the team's games, scoring four tries, as they finished fifth overall in the tournament.
