= 1998–99 Ulster Rugby season =

Professional provincial Rugby Union playing season

- Ground: Ravenhill Stadium (Capacity: 12,500)
- Coach: Harry Williams
- Captain(s): Mark McCall, David Humphreys, Dean Macartney
- Most appearances: Gary Longwell, Justin Fitzpatrick, David Humphreys, Simon Mason, Gary Leslie (15 each)
- Top scorer: Simon Mason (213)
- Most tries: Stephen McKinty, Jan Cunningham, Andy Ward (5 each)
- League(s): Heineken Cup (champions); IRFU Interprovincial Championship (2nd of 4)
1st kit	2nd kit

In Ulster Rugby's fourth season since the advent of professionalism, they were champions of the Heineken Cup, and finished second in the IRFU Interprovincial Championship.

Harry Williams was appointed as Director of Rugby, signing a three-year full time contract, starting on 1 July when he resigned as principal of Holywood Primary School. A former prop for Malone and Bangor, Williams had coached Bangor to Ulster League and Cup titles in the 1980s. He was Ulster's coach for four years from 1987, and had led them to four unbeaten seasons in the Interprovincial Championship. He was part of the Irish development squad coaching team for their tour of New Zealand in 1993, and was Ireland A coach for three years. Most recently, he was coach of Dublin side Bective Rangers for 18 months, before resigning for family reasons at the end of 1998. Former Ireland fullback Colin Wilkinson was assistant coach, and Harry Brennan was strength and conditioning coach.

Warren Gatland, the new Ireland coach, led a drive by the IRFU to bring Irish players who had signed contracts with English clubs back to Ireland. Ulster were strengthened by the return of out-half David Humphreys and centre Mark McCall from London Irish, centre Jonny Bell and hooker Allen Clarke from Northampton, and lock Mark Blair from Edinburgh, but locks Paddy Johns and Jeremy Davidson rejected the IRFU approach, Johns staying at Saracens, Davidson moving from London Irish to Castres. Two English-born Irish internationals were also signed: fullback Simon Mason from Richmond, and prop Justin Fitzpatrick from London Irish.

The IRFU announced that the Irish provinces would have squads of 30 players, most of whom would be full-time professionals, for the coming season. The IRFU Ulster Branch signed 19 full-time players for the 1998–99 season, including Jonny Bell, Justin Fitzpatrick, Allen Clarke, David Humphreys, Simon Mason, Maurice Field, Denis McBride, Stephen Ritchie, James Topping and Gary Longwell, while younger players like Robin Morrow and Sheldon Coulter were signed to part-time contracts.

Mark McCall was named as captain, but sustained a career-ending injury in a friendly against Glasgow on 28 September.

Ulster's Heineken Cup campaign started with a draw against Edinburgh, followed by a heavy defeat away to Toulouse. When the players reacted with relief that the scoreline was not as extreme as the 108–16 defeat Toulouse had recently inflicted on Ebbw Vale, Williams was furious. Training was revamped: where previously the team had trained in the early mornings and evenings to accommodate part-time players, daytime sessions were introduced for full-time professionals, with one evening session a week for the part-timers. Ulster defeated Ebbw Vale, and then Toulouse at home, in front of Ravenhill's biggest crowd for several years, and were unbeaten for the remainder of the pool stage. With Ebbw Vale beating Toulouse 19–11 at home in their final game, Ulster topped the pool with an away win over Edinburgh.

They drew Toulouse at home in the quarter-finals. In the second half, with Ulster narrowly in the lead, flanker Andy Ward received word that his wife had gone into labour, and left the field, replaced by Derek Topping. Toulouse almost took the lead, if not for a late try-saving tackle on Michel Marfaing by David Humphreys, who injured his shoulder in the process. Bryn Cunningham replaced him, and Ulster held on to win. This was followed by a home semi-final against Stade Français Paris, with Ravenhill's capacity increased to 20,000 with temporary stands. It featured a memorable try from Humphreys – from his own 22, he chipped the ball forward to Sheldon Coulter, who passed it back to Humphreys to run it in from the halfway line – as well as five penalties, a conversion and a drop goal from Simon Mason, in a 33–27 victory. In the final, held at Lansdowne Road in Dublin, Ulster defeated Colomiers 21–6 to become the first Irish side to lift the Heineken Cup.

Jonny Bell, Jeremy Davidson, Justin Fitzpatrick, David Humphreys, Eric Miller and Andy Ward were selected in the Ireland squad for the 1999 Five Nations Championship. Bell, Humphreys, Davidson, Fitzpatrick and Ward were selected for the 1999 tour to Australia.

The Women's Interprovincial Series was held at Cooke RFC in Belfast. Ulster finished second, losing the final to the Irish Exiles. Judith Wilson, Emma Jeffreys, Rosie Gallagher, Morag McGowan and Ruth Scott made their debuts for Ireland.

== Squad ==
Ulster Rugby squad
**Props**: (Ireland) **Justin Fitzpatrick**; (Ireland) Gary Leslie; (Ireland) Rab Irwin; (Ireland) Andrew Jackson; **Hookers**: (Ireland) **Allen Clarke**; (Ireland) Richard Weir; **Locks**: (Ireland) **Gary Longwell**; (Ireland) Murtagh Rea; (Ireland) Mark Blair; (Ireland) Michael Lightbody	**Back row**: (Ireland) Stephen McKinty; (Ireland) **Andy Ward**; (Ireland) Tony McWhirter; (Ireland) Dean Macartney; (Ireland) Stuart Duncan; (Ireland) Derek Topping; (Ireland) **Eric Miller**; (Ireland) Kevin McKee; (Ireland) Chris McCarey; **Scrum-halves**: (Ireland) Stephen Bell; (Ireland) Andrew Matchett; **Fly-halves**: (Ireland) **David Humphreys**; (Ireland) Bryn Cunningham; (Ireland) Michael Niblock	**Centres**: (South Africa) Clinton van Rensburg; (Ireland) **Jonny Bell**; (Ireland) Stan McDowell; (Ireland) **Mark McCall**; (Ireland) Gareth McCullough; **Wings**: (Ireland) Jan Cunningham; (Ireland) **James Topping**; (Ireland) Sheldon Coulter; (Ireland) Andy Park; (Ireland) Jonathan Davis; (Ireland) Neil McCluskey; **Fullbacks**: (Ireland) **Simon Mason**; (Ireland) Robin Morrow
(c) denotes the team captain, **Bold** denotes internationally capped players.^{*} denotes players qualified to play for Ireland on residency or dual nationality. Small text denotes players who only appeared in friendlies.

== Season record ==
Competition	Played	Won	Drawn	Lost	PF	PA	PD	TF	TA
1998-99 Heineken Cup	9	7	1	1	266	214	52	22	7
IRFU Interprovincial Championship	6	3	0	3	137	119	18	14	14
Representative	3	2	0	1	116	77	89	14	12
Total	18	12	1	5	519	410	109	50	33

== 1998–99 Heineken Cup ==
=== Pool 3 ===
Team	P	W	D	L	Tries for	Tries against	Try diff	Points for	Points against	Points diff	Pts
(Ireland) Ulster	6	4	1	1	23	20	3	197	168	29	9
(France) Toulouse	6	4	0	2	31	11	20	234	103	131	8
(Scotland) Edinburgh Reivers	6	2	1	3	21	14	7	179	146	33	5
(Wales) Ebbw Vale	6	1	0	5	11	41	−30	114	307	−193	2

18 September 1998	Ulster (Ireland)	38 – 38	(Scotland) Edinburgh	Ravenhill, Belfast
19:30	Try: Mason; McKinty; J. Cunningham (2); Con: Mason (3); Pen: Mason (4)	Report; Match centre	Try: Mayer; Roxburgh; Murray (2); Con: Hodge (3); Pen: Hodge (3); Drop: Hodge	Attendance: 9,000
Ulster lineup: 1. Justin Fitzpatrick, 2. Allen Clarke, 3. Gary Leslie, 4. Gary Longwell, 5. Murtagh Rea, 6. Stephen McKinty, 7. Andy Ward, 8. Tony McWhirter, 9. Stephen Bell, 10. David Humphreys (c), 11. Jan Cunningham, 12. Clinton van Rensburg, 13. Jonny Bell, 14. Sheldon Coulter, 15. Simon Mason.; Replacements: Stuart Duncan, (for Ward, 40), Andrew Matchett (for S. Bell, 60), Richard Weir (for Clarke, 62).				Attendance: 9,000

26 September 1998	Toulouse (France)	39 – 3	(Ireland) Ulster	Stade Ernest-Wallon, Toulouse
17:00	Try: Ntamack (2); Desbrosse; Marfaing; Laput; Con: Delaigue; Ougier (2); Pen: Ougier; Delaigue	Report; Match centre	Pen: Mason	Attendance: 5,000; Referee: D. Bevan
Ulster lineup: 1. Justin Fitzpatrick, 2. Richard Weir, 3. Gary Leslie, 4. Gary Longwell, 5. Murtagh Rea, 6. Stephen McKinty, 7. Dean Macartney, 8. Tony McWhirter, 9. Andrew Matchett, 10. David Humphreys (c), 11. Jan Cunningham, 12. Clinton van Rensburg, 13. Jonny Bell, 14. Sheldon Coulter, 15. Simon Mason.; Replacements: Stan McDowell (for Cunningham, 43), Stuart Duncan (for McWhirter, 55), Rab Irwin (for Leslie, 63), Stephen Bell (for Van Rensburg, 72), Mark Blair (for Rea, 76).				Attendance: 5,000; Referee: D. Bevan

10 October 1998	Ebbw Vale (Wales)	28 – 61	(Ireland) Ulster	Eugene Cross Park, Ebbw Vale
14:30	Try: Penalty try Manley; Taumalolo; Con: Hayward (2); Pen: Hayward (2)	Report; Match centre	Try: J. Bell; Humphreys (2); S. Bell; Blair; McKinty; Park; Con: Mason (7); Pen: Mason (4)	Attendance: 2,000
Ulster lineup: 1. Justin Fitzpatrick, 2. Allen Clarke, 3. Rab Irwin, 4. Mark Blair, 5. Gary Longwell, 6. Stephen McKinty, 7. Andy Ward, 8. Tony McWhirter, 9. Stephen Bell, 10. David Humphreys (c), 11. Jan Cunningham, 12. Clinton van Rensburg, 13. Jonny Bell, 14. Sheldon Coulter, 15. Simon Mason.; Replacements: Andy Park (for J. Bell, 40), Andrew Matchett (for S. Bell, 43), Gary Leslie (for Irwin, 65), Stuart Duncan (for Ward, 75).				Attendance: 2,000

16 October 1998	Ulster (Ireland)	29 – 24	(France) Toulouse	Ravenhill, Belfast
19:30	Try: Mason; McKinty; Van Rensburg; Con: Mason; Pen: Mason (4)	Report; Match centre	Try: Marfaing; Cazalbou (2); Con: Ougier (2); Delaigue	Attendance: 10,000
Ulster lineup: 1. Justin Fitzpatrick, 2. Allen Clarke, 3. Rab Irwin, 4. Mark Blair, 5. Gary Longwell, 6. Stephen McKinty, 7. Andy Ward, 8. Tony McWhirter, 9. Stephen Bell, 10. David Humphreys (c), 11. Jan Cunningham, 12. Clinton van Rensburg, 13. Jonny Bell, 14. Sheldon Coulter, 15. Simon Mason.; Replacements: Gary Leslie (for Irwin, 60).				Attendance: 10,000

30 October 1998	Ulster (Ireland)	43 – 18	(Wales) Ebbw Vale	Ravenhill, Belfast
19:30	Try: J. Cunningham; McWhirter; Irwin; Mason; S. Bell; Ward; Matchett; Con: Mason (4)	Report; Match centre	Try: Olsen; Faletau; Pen: Strange; Greene	Attendance: 4,500; Referee: F. Maciello
Ulster lineup: 1. Justin Fitzpatrick, 2. Allen Clarke, 3. Rab Irwin, 4. Mark Blair, 5. Gary Longwell, 6. Stephen McKinty, 7. Andy Ward, 8. Tony McWhirter, 9. Stephen Bell, 10. David Humphreys (c), 11. Jan Cunningham, 12. Clinton van Rensburg, 13. Jonny Bell, 14. Sheldon Coulter, 15. Simon Mason.; Replacements: Gary Leslie (for Irwin, 50), Andrew Matchett (for S. Bell, 62), Andy Park (for Mason, 74), Stuart Duncan (for McWhirter, 77).				Attendance: 4,500; Referee: F. Maciello

8 November 1998	Edinburgh (Scotland)	21 – 23	(Ireland) Ulster	Myreside, Edinburgh
15:00	Try: Stanger; Murray; Con: Chalmers; Pen: Chalmers (3)	Report; Match centre Highlights	Try: Blair; Coulter; Con: Mason (2); Pen: Mason (3)	Attendance: 4,000
Ulster lineup: 1. Justin Fitzpatrick, 2. Allen Clarke, 3. Rab Irwin, 4. Mark Blair, 5. Gary Longwell, 6. Stephen McKinty, 7. Andy Ward, 8. Tony McWhirter, 9. Stephen Bell, 10. David Humphreys (c), 11. Jan Cunningham, 12. Clinton van Rensburg, 13. Jonny Bell, 14. Sheldon Coulter, 15. Simon Mason.; Replacements: Richard Weir (for Clarke, 23), Derek Topping (for McWhirter, 51), Gary Leslie (for Irwin, 56).				Attendance: 4,000

=== Quarter-final ===
11 December 1998	Ulster (Ireland)	15 – 13	(France) Toulouse	Ravenhill, Belfast
19:15	Pen: Mason (3); Drop: Humphreys (2)	Report; Match centre	Try: Pelous; Con: Ougier; Pen: Delaigue (2)	Attendance: 11,500; Referee: B. Campbell
Ulster lineup: 1. Justin Fitzpatrick, 2. Allen Clarke, 3. Rab Irwin, 4. Mark Blair, 5. Gary Longwell, 6. Stephen McKinty, 7. Andy Ward, 8. Tony McWhirter, 9. Andrew Matchett, 10. David Humphreys (c), 11. Jan Cunningham, 12. Jonny Bell, 13. Stan McDowell, 14. Sheldon Coulter, 15. Simon Mason.; Replacements: Andy Park (for McDowell, 10), Derek Topping (for Ward, 48), Gary Leslie (for Irwin, 54), Richard Weir (for Clarke, 64), Bryn Cunningham (for Humphreys, 78)				Attendance: 11,500; Referee: B. Campbell

=== Semi-final ===
9 January 1999	Ulster (Ireland)	33–27	(France) Stade Français	Ravenhill, Belfast
13:00	Try: McKinty; Humphreys; Con: Mason; Pen: Mason (5); Drop: Mason, Humphreys	Report; Match centre Highlights	Try: Juillet (2); Lièvremont; Con: Dominguez (3); Pen: Dominguez (2)	Attendance: 20,000; Referee: J. Fleming
Ulster lineup: 1. Justin Fitzpatrick, 2. Allen Clarke, 3. Rab Irwin, 4. Mark Blair, 5. Gary Longwell, 6. Stephen McKinty, 7. Andy Ward, 8. Tony McWhirter, 9. Andrew Matchett, 10. David Humphreys (c), 11. Andy Park, 12. Jonny Bell, 13. Jan Cunningham, 14. Sheldon Coulter, 15. Simon Mason.; Replacements: Gary Leslie (for Irwin, 54), Derek Topping (for McWhirter, 33).				Attendance: 20,000; Referee: J. Fleming

=== Final ===
30 January 1999	Ulster (Ireland)	21–6	(France) Colomiers	Lansdowne Road, Dublin
14:45	Pen: Mason (6); Drop: Humphreys	Report; Match centre full match on video	Pen: Labit; Carre	Attendance: 49,000; Referee: Clayton Thomas (Wales)
Ulster lineup: 1. Justin Fitzpatrick, 2. Allen Clarke, 3. Rab Irwin, 4. Mark Blair, 5. Gary Longwell, 6. Stephen McKinty, 7. Andy Ward, 8. Tony McWhirter, 9. Andrew Matchett, 10. David Humphreys (c), 11. Andy Park, 12. Jonny Bell, 13. Jan Cunningham, 14. Sheldon Coulter, 15. Simon Mason.; Replacements: Stan McDowell (for Cunningham, 44), Gary Leslie (for Irwin, 73), Derek Topping (for McWhirter, 75).				Attendance: 49,000; Referee: Clayton Thomas (Wales)

== 1998–99 IRFU Interprovincial Championship ==
Team	P	W	D	L	F	A	BP	Pts	Status
Munster	6	4	0	2	125	92	2	18	Champions; qualified for 1999–2000 Heineken Cup
Ulster	6	3	0	3	137	119	3	15	Qualified for 1999–2000 Heineken Cup
Leinster	6	3	0	3	135	136	2	14	Qualified for 1999–2000 Heineken Cup
Connacht	6	2	0	4	95	145	3	11	Qualified for 1999–2000 European Challenge Cup

Top three teams qualify for next season's Heineken Cup.

14 August 1998	Leinster	14-34	Ulster	Donnybrook, Dublin
	Try: Horgan; Nowlan; Pen: McGowan (2)	Report	Try: Ward (2); McWhirter; McDowell; Con: Mason (4); Pen: Mason (2)
Ulster lineup: 1. Justin Fitzpatrick, 2. Allen Clarke, 3. Gary Leslie, 4. Murtagh Rea, 5. Gary Longwell, 6. Stephen McKinty, 7. Andy Ward, 8. Tony McWhirter, 9. Stephen Bell, 10. David Humphreys, 11. Andy Park, 12. Mark McCall (c), 13. Stan McDowell, 14. Jan Cunningham, 15. Simon Mason.

22 August 1998	Connacht	21-18	Ulster	The Sportsground, Galway
	Try: Duignan (2); Murphy; Con: Elwood (3)	Report	Try: J. Cunningham; Ward; Con: Mason; Pen: Mason (2)
Ulster lineup: 1. Justin Fitzpatrick, 2. Allen Clarke, 3. Gary Leslie, 4. Murtagh Rea, 5. Gary Longwell, 6. Stephen McKinty, 7. Andy Ward, 8. Tony McWhirter, 9. Stephen Bell, 10. David Humphreys, 11. Andy Park, 12. Mark McCall (c), 13. Stan McDowell, 14. Jan Cunningham, 15. Simon Mason.

4 September 1998	Ulster	29-12	Munster	Ravenhill, Belfast
	Try: J. Cunningham; Rea; Con: Mason (2); Pen: Mason (5)	Report	Pen: Keane (4)
Ulster lineup: 1. Justin Fitzpatrick, 2. Allen Clarke, 3. Gary Leslie, 4. Murtagh Rea, 5. Gary Longwell, 6. Dean Macartney (c), 7. Andy Ward, 8. Tony McWhirter, 9. Andrew Matchett, 10. David Humphreys, 11. Andy Park, 12. Jan Cunningham, 13. Jonny Bell, 14. Jonathan Davis, 15. Simon Mason.; Replacements: Stuart Duncan (for Macartney, 63), Rab Irwin (for Fitzpatrick, 79).

11 September 1998	Ulster	11-35	Leinster	Ravenhill, Belfast
	Try: Rea; Pen: Mason (2)	Report	Try: Nowlan (2); Hegarty; Holden; Hickie; Con: McGowan (2); Pen: McGowan (2)
Ulster lineup: 1. Justin Fitzpatrick, 2. Allen Clarke, 3. Gary Leslie, 4. Murtagh Rea, 5. Gary Longwell, 6. Dean Macartney (c), 7. Andy Ward, 8. Tony McWhirter, 9. Andrew Matchett, 10. David Humphreys, 11. Andy Park, 12. Jan Cunningham, 13. Jonny Bell, 14. Jonathan Davis, 15. Simon Mason.; Replacements: Bryn Cunningham (for Humphreys, 20), Stephen McKinty (for Macartney, 46), Sheldon Coulter (for Davis 52), Rab Irwin (for Fitzpatrick, 63), Stuart Duncan (for McWhirter, 73), Stephen Bell (for Matchett, 74)

3 October 1998	Munster	31-9	Ulster	Musgrave Park, Cork
	Try: Lacey; Horgan; Foley; Galwey; Con: Lynch; Pen: Lynch (3)	Report	Pen: Mason (2); Drop: Humphreys
Ulster lineup: 1. Justin Fitzpatrick, 2. Allen Clarke, 3. Gary Leslie, 4. Murtagh Rea, 5. Gary Longwell, 6. Dean Macartney (c), 7. Andy Ward, 8. Stephen McKinty, 9. Andrew Matchett, 10. David Humphreys, 11. Stan McDowell, 12. Clinton van Rensburg, 13. Jonny Bell, 14. Sheldon Coulter, 15. Simon Mason.

23 October 1998	Ulster	36-6	Connacht	Ravenhill, Belfast
	Try: Ward; McKinty; Topping; Clarke; Mason; Con: Mason (4); Pen: Mason	Report	Pen: Allnutt (2)	Referee: David McHugh
Ulster lineup: 1. Justin Fitzpatrick, 2. Allen Clarke, 3. Rab Irwin, 4. Mark Blair, 5. Gary Longwell, 6. Stephen McKinty, 7. Andy Ward, 8. Eric Miller, 9. Stephen Bell, 10. David Humphreys (c), 11. Jan Cunningham, 12. Clinton van Rensburg, 13. Jonny Bell, 14. James Topping, 15. Simon Mason.; Replacements: Gary Leslie (for Irwin, 53), Tony McWhirter (for McKinty, 61), Richard Weir (for Clarke, 71), Sheldon Coulter (for J. Cunningham, 80).				Referee: David McHugh

== Home attendance ==
Domestic League					European Cup					Total	
League	Fixtures	Average Attendance	Highest	Lowest	League	Fixtures	Average Attendance	Highest	Lowest	Total Attendance	Average Attendance
–	–	–	–	–	1998–99 Heineken Cup	5	11,000	20,000	4,500	55,000	11,000

== Representative matches ==
6 June 1998	Spanish Barbarians (Spain)	57-34	(Ireland) Ulster	Anoeta Stadium, San Sebastian
	Try: Taofifénua; Lagouarde (2); Bujaldon; Bidabe; Echeverria; Gallastegui; Aurrekoetxea; Etchetbarne; Con: Etcheto (3); Bidabe (3)	Report	Try: McCullough; McKee; McCarey; Coulter; Con: McCullough (4); Pen: Park (2)	Referee: Inaki Atorrasagasti
Ulster lineup: 1. Richard Mackey, 2. Richard Weir, 3. Rab Irwin, 4. Gary Longwell, 5. Murtagh Rea, 6. Stuart Duncan, 7. Kevin McKee, 8. Tony McWhirter, 9. Andrew Matchett, 10. Michael Niblock, 11. Neil McCluskey, 12. Stan McDowell, 13. Sheldon Coulter, 14. Jan Cunningham, 15. Andy Park.; Replacements: Gareth McCullough (for McDowell, 40), Stephen Bell (for Matchett, 61), Robin Morrow (for McCluskey, 61), Andrew Jackson (for Mackey, 53), Michael Lightbody (for Rea, 59), Stephen Ritchie (for Weir, 46), Chris McCarey (for Duncan, 61).				Referee: Inaki Atorrasagasti

10 August 1998	Ulster (Ireland)	50-5	Morocco	Ravenhill, Belfast
	Try: J. Cunningham (2); Mark McCall; McDowell, S.Bell, Park, Humphreys (2); Con: Mason (5)	Report	Try: Amina	Referee: David McHugh
Ulster lineup: 1. Justin Fitzpatrick, 2. Allen Clarke, 3. Gary Leslie, 4. Gary Longwell, 5. Murtagh Rea, 6. Stephen McKinty, 7. Andy Ward, 8. Tony McWhirter, 9. Stephen Bell, 10. David Humphreys, 11. Andy Park, 12. Mark McCall (c), 13. Stan McDowell, 14. Jan Cunningham, 15. Simon Mason.; Replacements: Andrew Matchett (for Bell, 40), Rab Irwin (for Leslie, 58), Dean Macartney (for Longwell, 58), Stuart Duncan (for Ward, 60), Sheldon Coulter (for McDowell, 69), Richard Weir (for Clarke, 73), Bryn Cunningham (for Humphreys, 79).				Referee: David McHugh

28 August 1998	Ulster (Ireland)	32-15	(Scotland) Glasgow District	Ravenhill, Belfast
	Try: McWhirter; Matchett; Con: Mason (2); Pen: Mason (5); Drop: Humphreys	Report	Try: Simmers; Stott; Con: Paterson; Pen: Paterson	Referee: David McHugh
Ulster lineup: 1. Justin Fitzpatrick, 2. Allen Clarke, 3. Gary Leslie, 4. Gary Longwell, 5. Murtagh Rea, 6. Dean Macartney, 7. Andy Ward, 8. Tony McWhirter, 9. Andrew Matchett, 10. David Humphreys, 11. Jan Cunninghan, 12. Mark McCall (c), 13. Stan McDowell, 14. Jonathan Davis, 15. Simon Mason.; Replacements: Richard Weir (for Clarke, 60), Rab Irwin (for Leslie, 73), Mark Blair (for Longwell, 73), Sheldon Coulter (for McDowell, 75), Chris McCarey (for McWhirter, 77).				Referee: David McHugh

== Ulster Rugby Awards ==
The IRFU Ulster Branch Awards ceremony was held on 27 May 1999 at the Balmoral Conference Centre. Winners were:

- Player of the year: Simon Mason
- Guinness personality of the year: David Humphreys
- Northern Bank coach of the year: Harry Williams
- Renault schools player of the year: Bryan Young, Ballymena Academy
- Calor Gas youth player of the year: David Cantley, Dromore
- First Trust club of the year: Dungannon RFC
- Dorrie B. Faulker Award: Joe Eagleson, competitions secretary

== Ulster Women ==
The third Women's Interprovincial Series was held at Cooke RFC in Belfast in October 1998, with the four provinces plus the Irish Exiles competing. Lorraine Noade was Ulster's captain. Johnny Neary was coach. Ulster made the final, but lost 12-3 to the Exiles.
