= 1998–99 Heineken Cup pool stage =

- Season: 1998–99 Heineken Cup
- Date: 18 September 1998 – 8 November 1998

Qualifiers
- Seed 1: (France) Perpignan
- Seed 2: (France) Stade Français
- Seed 3: (Ireland) Ulster
- Seed 4: (France) Colomiers
- Seed 5: (Ireland) Munster
- Seed 6: (France) Toulouse
- Seed 7: (Wales) Pontypridd
- Seed 8: (Wales) Llanelli

In the 1998–99 Heineken Cup pool stage teams received

- 2 points for a win
- 1 point for a draw

== Pool 1 ==
Team	P	W	D	L	Tries for	Tries against	Try diff	Points for	Points against	Points diff	Pts
(France) Stade Français	6	5	0	1	27	10	17	219	117	102	10
(Wales) Llanelli	6	3	0	3	12	22	−10	113	180	−67	6
(Ireland) Leinster	6	2	0	4	17	12	5	141	124	17	4
(France) Bègles-Bordeaux	6	2	0	4	11	23	−12	127	179	−52	4

19 September 1998
19:30

Llanelli Scarlets (Wales)	27–33	(Ireland) Leinster

Stradey Park
Attendance: 9,000

19 September 1998
15:15

Bordeaux-Begles (France)	28–39	(France) Stade Français

Stade Andre Moga
Attendance: 5,000

25 September 1998
18:30

Leinster (Ireland)	17–28	(France) Stade Français

Donnybrook
Attendance: 8,000

26 September 1998
14:30

Llanelli Scarlets (Wales)	22–10	(France) Bordeaux-Begles

Stradey Park
Attendance: 2,500

9 October 1998
18:30

Leinster (Ireland)	9–3	(France) Bordeaux-Begles

Donnybrook
Attendance: 4,000

9 October 1998
16:00

Stade Français (France)	49–3	(Wales) Llanelli Scarlets

Stadium Nord
Attendance: 7,000

17 October 1998
16:00

Stade Français (France)	56–31	(Ireland) Leinster

Stade Jean-Bouin
Attendance: 8,000

18 October 1998
15:00

Bordeaux Begles (France)	48–10	(Wales) Llanelli Scarlets

Stade Andre Moga
Attendance: 4,000

31 October 1998
14:30

Llanelli Scarlets (Wales)	17–13	(France) Stade Français

Stradey Park
Attendance: 2,000

31 October 1998
20:00

Bordeaux-Begles (France)	31–10	(Ireland) Leinster

Stade Andre Moga
Attendance: 3,000

6 November 1998
18:30

Leinster (Ireland)	27–34	(Wales) Llanelli Scarlets

Donnybrook
Attendance: 4,500

7 November 1998
15:30

Stade Français (France)	34–21	(France) Bordeaux-Begles

Stade Jean-Bouin
Attendance: 10,000

== Pool 2 ==
Team	P	W	D	L	Tries for	Tries against	Try diff	Points for	Points against	Points diff	Pts
(France) Perpignan	6	5	0	1	35	13	22	238	108	130	10
(Ireland) Munster	6	4	1	1	17	13	4	144	108	36	9
(Wales) Neath	6	1	1	4	14	27	−13	118	194	−76	3
(Italy) Safilo Petraca Rugby Padova	6	1	0	5	8	21	−13	79	169	−90	2

19 September 1998
14:30

Munster (Ireland)	20–13	(Italy) Petrarca

Musgrave Park
Attendance: 2,000

19 September 1998
14:30

Neath (Wales)	33–51	(France) Perpignan

The Gnoll
Attendance: 2,500

26 September 1998
14:30

Munster (Ireland)	34–10	(Wales) Neath

Musgrave Park
Attendance: 1,500

27 September 1998
15:00

Perpignan (France)	67–8	(Italy) Petrarca

Stade Aime Giral
Attendance: 4,000

10 October 1998
15:15

Perpignan (France)	41–24	(Ireland) Munster

Stade Gilbert Brutus
Attendance: 5,000

10 October 1998
20:00

Petrarca (Italy)	28–17	(Wales) Neath

Stadio Plebiscito
Attendance: 500

17 October 1998
14:30

Neath (Wales)	18–18	(Ireland) Munster

The Gnoll
Attendance: 1,200

17 October 1998
20:00

Petrarca (Italy)	6–14	(France) Perpignan

Stadio Plebiscito
Attendance: 1,000

31 October 1998
14:30

Munster (Ireland)	13–5	(France) Perpignan

Musgrave Park
Attendance: 4,000

31 October 1998
14:30

Neath (Wales)	16–3	(Italy) Petrarca

The Gnoll
Attendance: 1,500

8 November 1998
15:00

Perpignan (France)	60–24	(Wales) Neath

Stade Aime Giral
Attendance: 5,000

8 November 1998
16:00

Petrarca (Italy)	21–35	(Ireland) Munster

Stadio Plebiscito
Attendance: 500

== Pool 3 ==
Team	P	W	D	L	Tries for	Tries against	Try diff	Points for	Points against	Points diff	Pts
(Ireland) Ulster	6	4	1	1	23	20	3	197	168	29	9
(France) Toulouse	6	4	0	2	31	11	20	234	103	131	8
(Scotland) Edinburgh Reivers	6	2	1	3	21	14	7	179	146	33	5
(Wales) Ebbw Vale	6	1	0	5	11	41	−30	114	307	−193	2

18 September 1998
19:30

Ulster (Ireland)	38 – 38	(Scotland) Edinburgh
Try: Mason, McKinty, J. Cunningham (2); Con: Mason (3); Pen: Mason (4)	Report	Try: Mayer, Roxburgh, Murray (2); Con: Hodge (3); Pen: Hodge (3); Drop: Hodge

Ravenhill
Attendance: 9,000

19 September 1998
18:30

Toulouse (France)	108–16	(Wales) Ebbw Vale

Les Sept Deniers
Attendance: 8,000

26 September 1998
15:00

Edinburgh (Scotland)	41–17	(Wales) Ebbw Vale

Easter Road Stadium
Attendance: 2,000

26 September 1998
17:00

Toulouse (France)	39 – 3	(Ireland) Ulster
Try: Ntamack (2), Desbrosse, Marfaing, Laput; Con: Delaigue, Ougier (2); Pen: Ougier, Delaigue	Report	Pen: Mason

Les Sept Deniers
Attendance: 5,000
Referee: D. Bevan

10 October 1998
14:30

Ebbw Vale (Wales)	28 – 61	(Ireland) Ulster
Try: Penalty try Manley, Taumalolo; Con: Hayward (2); Pen: Hayward (2)	Report	Try: J. Bell, Humphreys (2), S. Bell, Blair, McKinty, Park; Con: Mason (7); Pen: Mason (4)

Eugene Cross Park
Attendance: 2,000

11 October 1998
15:00

Edinburgh (Scotland)	25–29	(France) Toulouse

Easter Road Stadium
Attendance: 3,000

16 October 1998
19:30

Ulster (Ireland)	29 – 24	(France) Toulouse
Try: Mason, McKinty, Van Rensburg; Con: Mason; Pen: Mason (4)	Report	Try: Marfaing, Cazalbou (2); Con: Ougier (2), Delaigue

Ravenhill
Attendance: 10,000

17 October 1998
14:30

Ebbw Vale (Wales)	16–43	(Scotland) Edinburgh

Eugene Cross Park
Attendance: 1,000

30 October 1998
19:30

Ulster (Ireland)	43 – 18	(Wales) Ebbw Vale
Try: J. Cunningham, McWhirter, Irwin, Mason, S. Bell, Ward, Matchett; Con: Mason (4)	Report	Try: Olsen, Faletau; Pen: Strange, Greene

Ravenhill
Attendance: 4,500
Referee: F. Maciello

31 October 1998
18:00

Toulouse (France)	23–11	(Scotland) Edinburgh

Les Sept Deniers
Attendance: 8,500

7 November 1998
14:30

Ebbw Vale (Wales)	19–11	(France) Toulouse

Eugene Cross Park
Attendance: 2,000

8 November 1998
15:00

Edinburgh (Scotland)	21 – 23	(Ireland) Ulster
Try: Stanger, Murray; Con: Chalmers; Pen: Chalmers (3)	Report; Highlights	Try: Blair, Coulter; Con: Mason (2); Pen: Mason (3)

Myreside
Attendance: 4,000

== Pool 4 ==
Team	P	W	D	L	Tries for	Tries against	Try diff	Points for	Points against	Points diff	Pts
(France) Colomiers	6	4	0	2	22	10	12	176	121	55	8
(Wales) Pontypridd	6	3	0	3	13	16	−3	160	141	19	6
(Italy) Benetton Treviso	6	3	0	3	13	13	0	142	150	−8	6
(Scotland) Glasgow Caledonians	6	2	0	4	10	19	−9	121	187	−66	4

19 September 1998
20:30

Benetton Treviso (Italy)	19–22	(France) Colomiers

Stadio Comunale di Monigo
Attendance: 3,000

20 September 1998
15:00

Glasgow (Scotland)	21–43	(Wales) Pontypridd

Firhill Stadium
Attendance: 2,000

26 September 1998
14:30

Pontypridd (Wales)	32–27	(France) Colomiers

Sardis Road
Attendance: 5,000

26 September 1998
20:30

Benetton Treviso (Italy)	34–15	(Scotland) Glasgow

Stadio Comunale di Monigo
Attendance: 1,100

9 October 1998
19:15

Pontypridd (Wales)	13–22	(Italy) Benetton Treviso

Sardis Road
Attendance: 6,500

10 October 1998
15:30

Colomiers (France)	34–16	(Scotland) Glasgow

Stade Selery
Attendance: 3,000

17 October 1998
15:30

Colomiers (France)	35–21	(Wales) Pontypridd

Stade Selery
Attendance: 4,000

18 October 1998
15:00

Glasgow (Scotland)	40–27	(Italy) Benetton Treviso

Firhill Stadium
Attendance: 2,040

31 October 1998
15:00

Benetton Treviso (Italy)	33–19	(Wales) Pontypridd

Stadio Comunale di Monigo
Attendance: 2,000

1 November 1998
15:00

Glasgow (Scotland)	26–17	(France) Colomiers

Firhill Stadium
Attendance: 2,000

25 October 1998
15:00

Colomiers (France)	41–7	(Italy) Benetton Treviso

Stade Selery
Attendance: 5,000

7 November 1998
17:30

Pontypridd (Wales)	32–3	(Scotland) Glasgow

Sardis Road
Attendance: 5,500

== Seeding ==
Seed	Pool Winners	Pts	TF	+/−
1	(France) Perpignan	10	35	+130
2	(France) Stade Français	10	27	+102
3	(Ireland) Ulster	9	23	+29
4	(France) Colomiers	8	22	+55
Seed	Pool Runners-up	Pts	TF	+/−
5	(Ireland) Munster	9	17	+36
6	(France) Toulouse	8	31	+131
7	(Wales) Pontypridd	6	13	+19
8	(Wales) Llanelli	6	12	−67

== See also ==
- 1998-99 Heineken Cup
