= 2000–01 Ulster Rugby season =

Professional provincial Rugby Union playing season

- Ground: Ravenhill Stadium (Capacity: 12,500)
- Coach: Harry Williams
- Captain: David Humphreys
- Most appearances: Justin Fitzpatrick, Gary Longwell, Andy Ward, Tony McWhirter, Brad Free, David Humphreys, Ryan Constable, James Topping (12 each)
- Top scorer: David Humphreys (148)
- Most tries: James Topping (6)
- League(s): Heineken Cup (4th in pool); IRFU Interprovincial Championship (2nd)

The 2000–01 season was Ulster Rugby's sixth since the advent of professionalism, and their third under coach Harry Williams. They competed in the Heineken Cup and the IRFU Interprovincial Championship. Williams announced in August 2000 that he would leave at the end of the season.

The IRFU rejected a proposal for a Celtic League involving three of the Irish provinces, two Scottish super-districts and seven Welsh clubs, each playing 22 matches. The IRFU argued that the structure proposed would add too many games and leave provincial players unable to play for their clubs, and made a counter-proposal of an eleven-game season, which the Welsh and Scottish unions rejected. Discussions continued, and a format was finally agreed for the following season.

They were bottom of their pool in the Heineken Cup, failing to qualify for the knockout stage. They finished second in the Interprovincial Championship, qualifying for next season's Heineken Cup. The average crowd at Interprovincial matches was 7,000, comparing favourably to 3,000 in the English first division. Tyrone Howe was Ulster's Player of the Year, and was selected for the 2001 British & Irish Lions tour to Australia.

Ulster women were champions of the IRFU Women's Interprovincial Series for the second year running. Jolene Morton and Karen Eagleson made their debuts for Ireland.

== Player transfers ==
=== Players in ===
- (Ireland) Clem Boyd from (England) Bath
- (Ireland) John Campbell from (Ireland) Terenure
- (Australia) Ryan Constable from (England) Saracens
- (Australia) Brad Free from (Ireland) Bective Rangers
- (South Africa) Grant Henderson from (South Africa) Natal
- (South Africa) Russell Nelson from (South Africa) Blue Bulls
- (New Zealand) Shane Stewart from (Ireland) Ballymena

=== Players out ===
- (Ireland) Simon Mason to (France) Stade Français Paris
- (Ireland) Eric Miller to (Ireland) Leinster
- (England) Spencer Bromley to (England) Worcester
- (South Africa) Riaz Fredericks (released)
- (Fiji) Joeli Veitayaki (released)

== Squad ==
Ulster Rugby squad
| **Props**: (Ireland) Simon Best; (Ireland) Clem Boyd; (Ireland) John Campbell; (Ireland) **Justin Fitzpatrick**; **Hookers**: (Ireland) **Allen Clarke**; (Ireland) Paul Shields; (Ireland) Richard Weir; (Australia) Mark Crick; **Locks**: (Ireland) Mark Blair; (Ireland) **Paddy Johns**; (Ireland) Aidan Kearney; (Ireland) Gary Longwell | **Back row**: (Ireland) Chris McCarey; (Ireland) Tony McWhirter; (South Africa) Russell Nelson*; (Ireland) **Dion O'Cuinneagain**; (Ireland) Derek Topping; (Ireland) **Andy Ward**; **Scrum-halves**: (Ireland) Stephen Bell; (Ireland) Neil Doak; (Australia) Brad Free*; **Fly-halves**: (Ireland) **David Humphreys** (c); (Ireland) **Niall Malone** | **Centres**: (Ireland) **Jonny Bell**; (Ireland) **Tyrone Howe**; (Ireland) Seamus Mallon; (New Zealand) Shane Stewart; **Wings**: (Australia) **Ryan Constable**; (Ireland) Sheldon Coulter; (Ireland) Jan Cunningham; (Ireland) **Tyrone Howe**; (Ireland) **James Topping**; **Fullbacks**: (South Africa) Grant Henderson; (Ireland) Bryn Cunningham |
(c) denotes the team captain, **Bold** denotes internationally capped players.^{*} denotes players qualified to play for Ireland on residency or dual nationality.

== Season record ==
| Competition | Played | Won | Drawn | Lost | PF | PA | PD | TF | TA |
|---|---|---|---|---|---|---|---|---|---|
| 2000-01 Heineken Cup | 6 | 1 | 1 | 4 | 146 | 201 | -59 | 11 | 21 |
| IRFU Interprovincial Championship | 6 | 3 | 0 | 3 | 144 | 119 | 25 | 15 | 9 |
| Total | 12 | 4 | 1 | 7 | 290 | 320 | -30 | 24 | 30 |

== 2000–01 Heineken Cup ==
| Team | P | W | D | L | Tries for | Tries against | Try diff | Points for | Points against | Points diff | Pts |
|---|---|---|---|---|---|---|---|---|---|---|---|
| (Wales) Cardiff | 6 | 4 | 0 | 2 | 18 | 13 | 5 | 182 | 146 | 36 | **8** |
| (England) Saracens | 6 | 4 | 0 | 2 | 14 | 13 | 1 | 174 | 140 | 34 | **8** |
| (France) Toulouse | 6 | 2 | 1 | 3 | 19 | 15 | 4 | 171 | 182 | −11 | **5** |
| (Ireland) Ulster | 6 | 1 | 1 | 4 | 11 | 21 | −10 | 146 | 205 | −59 | **3** |

| 6 October 2000 | **Ulster (Ireland)** | **32 – 23** | **(Wales) Cardiff** | Ravenhill, Belfast |
| 19:15 | Try: Constable; Howe; Con: Humphreys (2); Pen: Humphreys (5); Drop: Humphreys | Report; Match centre | Try: Jenkins; Morgan; Con: Jenkins (2); Pen: Jenkins (3) | Attendance: 12,000 |
| Ulster lineup: 1. Justin Fitzpatrick, 2. Richard Weir, 3. Simon Best, 4. Paddy Johns, 5. Gary Longwell, 6. Russell Nelson, 7. Andy Ward, 8. Tony McWhirter, 9. Brad Free, 10. David Humphreys (c), 11. Tyrone Howe, 12. Jonny Bell, 13. Ryan Constable, 14. James Topping, 15. Grant Henderson.; Replacements: Derek Topping (for Nelson, 20), Mark Blair (for Johns, 61), Clem Boyd (for Best, 65). | | | | Attendance: 12,000 |

| 15 October 2000 | **Saracens (England)** | **55 – 25** | **(Ireland) Ulster** | Vicarage Road, Watford |
| 15:00 | Try: Hill (2); McRae; Luger (3); Con: Castaignède (5); Pen: Castaignède (5) | Report; Match centre | Try: Stewart; Con: Humphreys; Pen: Humphreys (6) | Attendance: 11,258 |
| Ulster lineup: 1. Justin Fitzpatrick, 2. Richard Weir, 3. Simon Best, 4. Paddy Johns, 5. Gary Longwell, 6. Derek Topping, 7. Andy Ward, 8. Tony McWhirter, 9. Brad Free, 10. David Humphreys (c), 11. Tyrone Howe, 12. Shane Stewart, 13. Ryan Constable, 14. James Topping, 15. Grant Henderson.; Replacements: Mark Blair (for Johns, 40), Chris McCarey (for D. Topping, 68), Sheldon Coulter (for Stewart, 79). | | | | Attendance: 11,258 |

| 22 October 2000 | **Toulouse (France)** | **35 – 35** | **(Ireland) Ulster** | Stadium Municipal, Toulouse |
| 15:00 | Try: Pelous; Labit; Fillol; Desbrosse; Con: Marfaing (3); Pen: Marfaing (3) | Report; Match centre | Try: Free; Howe; J. Bell; J. Topping; Con: Humphreys (3); Pen: Humphreys (3) | Attendance: 14,000 |
| Ulster lineup: 1. Justin Fitzpatrick, 2. Richard Weir, 3. Simon Best, 4. Gary Longwell, 5. Mark Blair, 6. Russell Nelson, 7. Andy Ward, 8. Tony McWhirter, 9. Brad Free, 10. David Humphreys (c), 11. Tyrone Howe, 12. Ryan Constable, 13. Jonny Bell, 14. James Topping, 15. Grant Henderson.; Replacements: Shane Stewart (for Constable, 40), Clem Boyd (for Best, 40), Paul Shields (for Weir, 72). | | | | Attendance: 14,000 |

| 27 October 2000 | **Ulster (Ireland)** | **25 – 29** | **(France) Toulouse** | Ravenhill, Belfast |
| 19:30 | Try: Ward; Con: Humphreys; Pen: Humphreys (6) | Report; Match centre | Try: Desbrosse; Servat; Con: Delaigue; Marfaing; Pen: Delaigue (5) | Attendance: 12,000 |
| Ulster lineup: 1. Justin Fitzpatrick, 2. Richard Weir, 3. Clem Boyd, 4. Mark Blair, 5. Gary Longwell, 6. Russell Nelson, 7. Andy Ward, 8. Tony McWhirter, 9. Brad Free, 10. David Humphreys (c), 11. Tyrone Howe, 12. Jonny Bell, 13. Ryan Constable, 14. James Topping, 15. Grant Henderson.; Replacements: Derek Topping (for Russell, 16). | | | | Attendance: 12,000 |

| 12 January 2001 | **Cardiff (Wales)** | **42 – 16** | **(Ireland) Ulster** | Cardiff Arms Park |
| 19:05 | Try: Robinson (2); Jenkins; Quinnell; Con: Jenkins (2); Pen: Jenkins (5); Drop: Jenkins | Report; Match centre | Try: J. Topping (2); Pen: Humphreys (2) | Attendance: 10,500 |
| Ulster lineup: 1. Justin Fitzpatrick, 2. Allen Clarke, 3. Clem Boyd, 4. Mark Blair, 5. Gary Longwell, 6. Russell Nelson, 7. Andy Ward, 8. Tony McWhirter, 9. Brad Free, 10. David Humphreys (c), 11. Tyrone Howe, 12. Jonny Bell, 13. Ryan Constable, 14. James Topping, 15. Stan McDowell. | | | | Attendance: 10,500 |

| 19 January 2001 | **Ulster (Ireland)** | **13 – 21** | **(England) Saracens** | Ravenhill, Belfast |
| 19:30 | Try: Humphreys; Con: Humphreys; Pen: Humphreys (2) | Report; Match centre | Try: Shanklin; McRae; Hill; Con: McRae (3) | Attendance: 13,500 |
| Ulster lineup: 1. Justin Fitzpatrick, 2. Allen Clarke, 3. Simon Best, 4. Gary Longwell, 5. Paddy Johns, 6. Russell Nelson, 7. Andy Ward, 8. Tony McWhirter, 9. Brad Free, 10. David Humphreys (c), 11. Tyrone Howe, 12. Ryan Constable, 13. Jonny Bell, 14. James Topping, 15. Stan McDowell.; Replacements: Niall Malone (for J. Bell, 47), Richard Weir (for Clarke, 48), Stephen Bell (for Free, 48), Mark Blair (for Longwell, 58), Clem Boyd (for Best, 60), Sheldon Coulter (for McDowell, 80). | | | | Attendance: 13,500 |

== 2000-01 IRFU Interprovincial Championship ==
| Team | P | W | D | L | F | A | BP | Pts | Status |
|---|---|---|---|---|---|---|---|---|---|
| Munster | 6 | 5 | 1 | 0 | 151 | 99 | 1 | **23** | Champions; qualified for 2001–02 Heineken Cup |
| Ulster | 6 | 3 | 0 | 3 | 144 | 119 | 3 | **15** | Qualified for 2001–02 Heineken Cup |
| Leinster | 6 | 2 | 1 | 3 | 109 | 111 | 2 | **12** | Qualified for 2001–02 Heineken Cup |
| Connacht | 6 | 1 | 0 | 5 | 100 | 175 | 1 | **5** | Qualified for 2001–02 European Challenge Cup |

| 1 September 2000 | **Ulster** | **16-21** | **Munster** | Ravenhill, Belfast |
| | Try: Ward; Con: Humphreys; Pen: Humphreys (3) | Report | Pen: O'Gara (5); Drop: O'Gara (2) |
Ulster lineup: 1. Justin Fitzpatrick, 2. Richard Weir, 3. Simon Best, 4. Gary Longwell, 5. Paddy Johns, 6. Russell Nelson, 7. Andy Ward, 8. Tony McWhirter, 9. Brad Free, 10. David Humphreys (c), 11. Tyrone Howe, 12. Jonny Bell, 13. Ryan Constable, 14. James Topping, 15. Grant Henderson.

| 9 September 2000 | **Connacht** | **15-39** | **Ulster** | The Sportsground, Galway |
| | Try: Lee; Elwood; Con: Elwood; Pen: Elwood | Report | Try: Nelson; Johns; J. Bell; J. Topping; Stewart; Con: Humphreys (4); Pen: Humphreys (3) |
Ulster lineup: 1. Justin Fitzpatrick, 2. Richard Weir, 3. Simon Best, 4. Paddy Johns, 5. Gary Longwell, 6. Russell Nelson, 7. Andy Ward, 8. Tony McWhirter, 9. Brad Free, 10. David Humphreys (c), 11. Tyrone Howe, 12. Jonny Bell, 13. Ryan Constable, 14. James Topping, 15. Grant Henderson.; Replacements: Mark Blair (for Longwell, 60), Shane Stewart (for Henderson, 63), Stephen Bell (for Free, 71), Derek Topping (for Ward, 74)

| 15 September 2000 | **Leinster** | **19-6** | **Ulster** | Donnybrook, Dublin |
| | Try: Hickie; Con: McHugh; Pen: McHugh (2); Dempsey | Report | Pen: Humphreys (2) |
Ulster lineup: 1. Justin Fitzpatrick, 2. Richard Weir, 3. Simon Best, 4. Paddy Johns, 5. Gary Longwell, 6. Russell Nelson, 7. Andy Ward, 8. Tony McWhirter, 9. Brad Free, 10. David Humphreys (c), 11. Tyrone Howe, 12. Jonny Bell, 13. Ryan Constable, 14. James Topping, 15. Grant Henderson.; Replacements: Derek Topping (for McWhirter, 40), Shane Stewart (for Henderson, 67), Stephen Bell (for Free, 75).

| 22 September 2000 | **Ulster** | **26-13** | **Leinster** | Ravenhill, Belfast |
| | Try: J. Bell; Ward; Con: Humphreys (2); Pen: Humphreys (4) | Report | Try: McHugh; Con: McHugh; Drop: O'Driscoll |
Ulster lineup: 1. Justin Fitzpatrick, 2. Richard Weir, 3. Simon Best, 4. Mark Blair, 5. Gary Longwell, 6. Russell Nelson, 7. Andy Ward, 8. Tony McWhirter, 9. Brad Free, 10. David Humphreys (c), 11. Tyrone Howe, 12. Jonny Bell, 13. Ryan Constable, 14. James Topping, 15. Grant Henderson.; Replacements: Derek Topping (for Nelson, 59), Stephen Bell (for Free, 63), Shane Stewart (for J. Topping, 77).

| 29 September 2000 | **Munster** | **29-21** | **Ulster** | Thomond Park, Limerick |
| | Try: Crotty; Horgan; Con: O'Gara (2); Pen: O'Gara (5) | Report | Try: Free; J. Topping; Con: Humphreys; Pen: Humphreys (3) |
Ulster lineup: 1. Justin Fitzpatrick, 2. Richard Weir, 3. Simon Best, 4. Paddy Johns, 5. Gary Longwell, 6. Russell Nelson, 7. Andy Ward, 8. Tony McWhirter, 9. Brad Free, 10. David Humphreys (c), 11. Shane Stewart, 12. Jonny Bell, 13. Ryan Constable, 14. James Topping, 15. Grant Henderson.; Replacements: Derek Topping (for McWhirter, 64), Mark Blair (for Johns, 71), Clem Boyd (for Best, 71), Stephen Bell (for Free, 76).

| 3 November 2000 | **Ulster** | **36-22** | **Connacht** | Ravenhill, Belfast |
| | Try: J. Topping; Blair (2); Humphreys; Ward; Con: Humphreys (4); Pen: Humphreys | Report | Try: O'Connor; Munn; Schoemann; Con: Munn (2); Pen: Munn |
Ulster lineup: 1. Justin Fitzpatrick, 2. Richard Weir, 3. Clem Boyd, 4. Gary Longwell, 5. Mark Blair, 6. Russell Nelson, 7. Andy Ward, 8. Tony McWhirter, 9. Brad Free, 10. David Humphreys (c), 11. Sheldon Coulter, 12. Shane Stewart, 13. Ryan Constable, 14. James Topping, 15. Grant Henderson.; Replacements: Simon Best (for Boyd, 32), Paddy Johns (for Longwell, 40), Paul Shields (for Weir, 50), Derek Topping (for McWhirter, 62), Neil Doak (for Free, 67).

== Home attendance ==
| Domestic League | | | | | European Cup | | | | | Total | |
| League | Fixtures | Average Attendance | Highest | Lowest | League | Fixtures | Average Attendance | Highest | Lowest | Total Attendance | Average Attendance |
| – | – | – | – | – | 2000–01 Heineken Cup | 3 | **12,500** | 13,500 | 12,000 | 37,500 | **12,500** |

== Friendlies ==
| 5 August 2000 | **Ulster (Ireland)** | **31-12** | **(England) Leicester Tigers** | Thomas Mellon Playing Fields, Omagh |
| | Try: Topping; Malone; Coulter; McWhirter; B. Cunningham; Con: Malone (2); Humphreys | Report | Try: Howard; Reeves; Con: Meenan | Referee: Gareth Doyle |
| Ulster lineup: 1. Justin Fitzpatrick, 2. Allen Clarke, 3. Clem Boyd, 4. Gary Longwell, 5. Mark Blair, 6. Russell Nelson, 7. Andy Ward, 8. Tony McWhirter, 9. Brad Free, 10. David Humphreys, 11. Tyrone Howe, 12. Shane Stewart, 13. Ryan Constable, 14. James Topping, 15. Grant Henderson.; Replacements: Simon Best, Richie Weir, John Campbell, Aidan Kearney, Chris McCarey, Derek Topping, Stephen Bell, Niall Malone, Sheldon Coulter, Seamus Mallon, Bryn Cunningham. | | | | Referee: Gareth Doyle |

| 11 August 2000 | **Coventry (England)** | **0-64** | **(Ireland) Ulster** | Coundon Road Stadium, Coventry |
| | | Report | Try: McWhirter; Stewart; Topping (3); Penalty try Humphreys; Coulter; Howe; Con: Humphreys (7) | Referee: M. Fox |
| Ulster lineup: 1. Simon Best, 2. Allen Clarke, 3. Clem Boyd, 4. Gary Longwell, 5. Mark Blair, 6. Russell Nelson, 7. Andy Ward, 8. Tony McWhirter, 9. Stephen Bell, 10. David Humphreys, 11. Sheldon Coulter, 12. Shane Stewart, 13. Ryan Constable, 14. James Topping, 15. Bryn Cunningham.; Replacements: Justin Fitzpatrick (for Best, 45'), Niall Malone (for Cunningham, 56'), Richie Weir (for Clarke, 60'), John Campbell (for Boyd, 67'), Seamus Mallon (for Humphreys, 70'), Derek Topping (for Nelson, 70'). | | | | Referee: M. Fox |

| 18 August 2000 | **Ulster (Ireland)** | **37-11** | **(Scotland) Edinburgh Reivers** | Ravenhill, Belfast |
| | Try: Free (2); Stewart (2); Nelson; Topping; Con: Humphreys (2); Pen: Humphreys | Report | Try: Tom Weir; Pen: Duncan Hodge (2) | Attendance: 6,000; Referee: M. Fox |
| Ulster lineup: 1. Justin Fitzpatrick, 2. Allen Clarke, 3. Clem Boyd, 4. Gary Longwell, 5. Mark Blair, 6. Russell Nelson, 7. Andy Ward, 8. Tony McWhirter, 9. Brad Free, 10. David Humphreys (c), 11. Tyrone Howe, 12. Shane Stewart, 13. Ryan Constable, 14. James Topping, 15. Grant Henderson.; Replacements: Richie Weir (for Clarke, 8'), Derek Topping (for Ward, 8-19', for McWhirter, 48'), Paddy Johns (for Blair, 24-36'), Simon Best (for Fitzpatrick, 69'), Sheldon Coulter (for Howe, 78') | | | | Attendance: 6,000; Referee: M. Fox |

| 25 August 2000 | **Ulster (Ireland)** | **35-0** | **(England) Rugby Lions** | Ravenhill, Belfast |
| | Try: Malone; Sheldon Coulter; Weir; J. Cunningham; Howe; Con: Malone (4); Humphreys | Report | | Referee: D. Napier |
| Ulster lineup: 1. Simon Best, 2. Richard Weir, 3. John Campbell, 4. Paddy Johns (c), 5. Mark Blair, 6. Chris McCarey, 7. Derek Topping, 8. Russell Nelson, 9. Brad Free, 10. Niall Malone, 11. Sheldon Coulter, 12. Jonny Bell, 13. Shane Stewart, 14. Jan Cunningham, 15. Grant Henderson.; Replacements: James Topping (for J. Cunningham 50'), David Humphreys (for Malone 50'), Clem Boyd (for Campbell 50'), Gary Longwell (for Blair 50'), Andy Ward (for McCarey 50'), Ryan Constable (for J Bell 58'), Tyrone Howe (for Coulter 58'), Justin Fitzpatrick (for Best 58'), Stephen Bell (for Free 67'), Paul Shields (for Weir 72') | | | | Referee: D. Napier |

== Ulster Rugby Awards ==
The Ulster Rugby Awards ceremony was held on 24 May 2001. Winners were:

- Ulster Rugby player of the year: Tyrone Howe
- Supporters' Club player of the year: Tyrone Howe
- Guinness personality of the year: Gary Longwell
- Coach of the year: Willie Anderson, Dungannon RFC
- Schools player of the year: Glen Telford, RBAI
- Youth player of the year: Wayne Dougan, Banbridge RFC
- Club of the year: Clogher Valley RFC
- PRO Award: Terry Jackson, Dungannon RFC
- Dorrington B Faulkner Memorial Award: Roy McGarvey, Coleraine

== Ulster Women ==
Ulster, coached by Frances Doherty, successfully defended their Women's Interprovincial Series title, albeit only on points difference from Munster.

| 7 October 2000 | **Ulster** | **34-0** | **Leinster** | Shaws Bridge, Belfast |
| | Try: Fiona Neary (2); Eryka Wessells; Suzanne Fleming; Fiona Neary; Rachel Boyd; Con: Rachel Reid (2) | Report |

| 21 October 2000 | **Munster** | **10-0** | **Ulster** | Limerick |
| | Try: Olivia Brown; Leonie O'Callaghan | Report |
Ulster lineup: 1. G Oliver, 2. Ruth Scott, 3. D Campbell, 4. Tara Lunny, 5. M Dodd, 6. Rachel Reid (c), 7. Jill Henderson, 8. Eryka Wessells, 9. Jolene Morton, 10. Gillian McAllister, 11. Rachel Boyd, 12. Suzanne Fleming, 13. Fiona Neary, 14. C Wilson, 15. Joy Sparkes.; Replacements: L Nicholl, Maura McArdle, R Currie, Abby Magowan, Rosie Gallagher, L Fagan, T McKnight.

| 4 November 2000 | **Connacht** | **0-20** | **Ulster** | The Sportsground, Galway |
| | Try: Rachel Boyd; Joy Sparkes; Suzanne Fleming; Con: Rachel Reid; Pen: Rachel Reid | Report |

| 25 November 2000 | **Leinster** | **0-32** | **Ulster** | Barnhall RFC |
| | | Report | Try: Rosie Gallagher; Fiona Neary (2); Rachel Reid (2); Con: Rachel Reid (2); Pen: Rachel Reid |

| 2 December 2000 | **Ulster** | **11-0** | **Munster** | Shaws Bridge, Belfast |
| | Try: Rachel Boyd; Pen: Rachel Reid (2) | Report |

| 6 January 2001 | **Ulster** | **44-0** | **Connacht** | Terenure College RFC, Dublin |
| | Try: Joy Sparkes (2); Rachel Boyd (2); Jackie McKernan (2); Rachel Reid; Con: Rachel Reid (3); Pen: Rachel Reid | Report |
