= 1999–2000 Ulster Rugby season =

Professional provincial Rugby Union playing season

- Ground: Ravenhill Stadium (Capacity: 12,500)
- Coach: Harry Williams
- Captain: David Humphreys
- Most appearances: Gary Longwell, Eric Miller, Simon Mason (12 each)
- Top scorer: Simon Mason (145)
- Most tries: Tyrone Howe (4); Spencer Bromley (4)
- League(s): Heineken Cup (4th in pool); IRFU Interprovincial Championship (2nd)

The 1999–2000 season was Ulster Rugby's fifth season under professionalism, and Harry Williams's second season as head coach. They competed in the Heineken Cup and the IRFU Interprovincial Championship.

Ahead of the new season, Williams signed Paddy Johns, Simon Best, Niall Malone, Tyrone Howe, Spencer Bromley and Riaz Fredericks to full-time contracts. Mark McCall retired as a player, and was appointed assistant coach.

In the Heineken Cup, Ulster finished bottom of their pool. They came second in the Interprovincial Championship, qualifying for next season's Heineken Cup. Tony McWhirter was Ulster's Player of the Year.

Plans for a Celtic League, featuring the Irish provinces alongside teams from Scotland and Wales, were mooted. This would give the provinces a 12-game league schedule, alongside six Interpros and at least six Heineken Cup matches, and mean contracted players would no longer be available for their All-Ireland League clubs, but play exclusively for their provinces. This plan would not materialise for another few seasons.

Ulster women were champions of the Women's Interprovincial Series for the first time. Rachel Boyd made her debut for Ireland, and Suzanne Fleming was named Ireland captain.

== Player transfers ==
=== Players in ===
- (Ireland) Simon Best from (England) Newcastle
- (England) Spencer Bromley from (England) Harlequins
- (South Africa) Riaz Fredericks from Hong Kong sevens team
- (Ireland) Tyrone Howe from (England) Newbury
- (Ireland) Paddy Johns from (England) Saracens
- (Ireland) Niall Malone from (England) Worcester
- (Ireland) Dion O'Cuinneagain from (England) Sale
- (Fiji) Joeli Veitayaki from (New Zealand) Northland

=== Players out ===
- (Ireland) Mark McCall (retired)
- (Ireland) Stan McDowell (out of contract)
- (Ireland) Andy Park (out of contract)

== Squad ==
Ulster Rugby squad
**Props**: (Ireland) Simon Best; (Ireland) **Justin Fitzpatrick**; (Ireland) Rab Irwin; (Ireland) Lewis Johnston; (Ireland) Gary Leslie; (Fiji) **Joeli Veitayaki**; **Hookers**: (Ireland) **Allen Clarke**; (Ireland) Richard Weir; **Locks**: (Ireland) Mark Blair; (Ireland) **Paddy Johns**; (Ireland) Gary Longwell	**Back row**: (Ireland) Stephen McKinty; (Ireland) Tony McWhirter; (Ireland) **Eric Miller**; (Ireland) **Dion O'Cuinneagain**; (Ireland) Derek Topping; (Ireland) **Andy Ward**; **Scrum-halves**: (Ireland) Stephen Bell; (Ireland) Mark Edwards; (Ireland) Andrew Matchett; **Fly-halves**: (Ireland) **David Humphreys** (c)	**Centres**: (Ireland) **Jonny Bell**; (Ireland) Jan Cunningham; (South Africa) Riaz Fredericks; (Ireland) Tyrone Howe; (Ireland) **Niall Malone**; **Wings**: (England) Spencer Bromley; (Ireland) **James Topping**; (Ireland) Sheldon Coulter; **Fullbacks**: (Ireland) **Simon Mason**
(c) denotes the team captain, **Bold** denotes internationally capped players.^{*} denotes players qualified to play for Ireland on residency or dual nationality.

== Season record ==
Competition	Played	Won	Drawn	Lost	PF	PA	PD	TF	TA
1999-2000 Heineken Cup	6	0	0	6	71	179	-108	4	20
IRFU Interprovincial Championship	6	3	0	3	186	129	57	18	8
Total	12	3	0	9	257	308	-51	22	28

== 1999–2000 Heineken Cup ==
=== Pool 3 ===
Team	P	W	D	L	Tries for	Tries against	Try diff	Points for	Points against	Points diff	Pts
(Wales) **Llanelli**	6	5	0	1	17	8	9	152	86	66	**10**
(England) **Wasps**	6	5	0	1	16	9	7	163	99	64	**10**
(France) Bourgoin	6	2	0	4	14	14	0	140	162	−22	**4**
(Ireland) Ulster	6	0	0	6	4	20	−16	71	179	−108	**0**

20 November 1999	**Bourgoin (France)**	**26 – 12**	**(Ireland) Ulster**	Stade Pierre Rajon, Bourgoin-Jallieu
19:30	Try: Balue; Glas; Con: Péclier (2); Pen: Péclier (4)	Report; Match centre	Pen: Mason 4	Attendance: 7,000
Ulster lineup: 1. Justin Fitzpatrick, 2. Allen Clarke, 3. Joeli Veitayaki, 4. Paddy Johns, 5. Gary Longwell, 6. Eric Miller, 7. Dion O'Cuinneagain, 8. Tony McWhirter, 9. Stephen Bell, 10. David Humphreys (c), 11. Spencer Bromley, 12. Niall Malone, 13. Jan Cunningham, 14. James Topping, 15. Simon Mason.; Replacements: Simon Best (for Veitayaki), Tyrone Howe (for Malone), Mark Edwards (for Bell), Mark Blair (for Longwell), Derek Topping (for O'Cuinneagain).				Attendance: 7,000

26 November 1999	**Ulster (Ireland)**	**6 – 19**	**(England) London Wasps**	Ravenhill, Belfast
19:30	Pen: Mason (2)	Report; Match centre	Try: Green; Con: Logan; Pen: Logan (4)	Attendance: 12,000
Ulster lineup: 1. Justin Fitzpatrick, 2. Allen Clarke, 3. Joeli Veitayaki, 4. Paddy Johns, 5. Mark Blair, 6. Eric Miller, 7. Andy Ward, 8. Tony McWhirter, 9. Stephen Bell, 10. David Humphreys (c), 11. Spencer Bromley, 12. Jonny Bell, 13. Jan Cunningham, 14. James Topping, 15. Simon Mason.; Replacements: Niall Malone (for J. Bell, 39), Derek Topping (for Miller, 40), Tyrone Howe (for Malone, 42), Gary Longwell (for Johns, 78).				Attendance: 12,000

10 December 1999	**Ulster (Ireland)**	**6 – 29**	**(Wales) Llanelli**	Ravenhill, Belfast
19:30	Pen: Mason (2)	Report; Match centre	Try: Wyatt; Finua; Con: Jones (2); Pen: Jones (5)	Attendance: 8,000; Referee: Steve Lander
Ulster lineup: 1. Justin Fitzpatrick, 2. Allen Clarke, 3. Joeli Veitayaki, 4. Paddy Johns, 5. Mark Blair, 6. Eric Miller, 7. Andy Ward, 8. Tony McWhirter, 9. Mark Edwards, 10. David Humphreys (c), 11. Spencer Bromley, 12. Jonny Bell, 13. Jan Cunningham, 14. James Topping, 15. Simon Mason.; Replacements: Dion O'Cuinneagain (for McWhirter, 22), Richard Weir (for Clarke, 27), Stephen Bell (for Edwards, 54), Gary Longwell (for Johns, 68), Tyrone Howe (for J. Topping, 77), Niall Malone (for Mason, 78).				Attendance: 8,000; Referee: Steve Lander

18 December 1999	**Llanelli (Wales)**	**20 – 3**	**(Ireland) Ulster**	Stradey Park, Llanelli
14:40	Try: Wyatt; Davies; Con: Jones (2); Pen: Jones (2)	Report; Match centre	Pen: Mason	Attendance: 3,000
Ulster lineup: 1. Justin Fitzpatrick, 2. Richard Weir, 3. Joeli Veitayaki, 4. Paddy Johns, 5. Gary Longwell, 6. Dion O'Cuinneagain, 7. Derek Topping, 8. Eric Miller, 9. Mark Edwards, 10. Niall Malone, 11. Spencer Bromley, 12. Jonny Bell, 13. Jan Cunningham, 14. Sheldon Coulter, 15. Simon Mason.; Replacements: Simon Best (for Veitayaki), Stephen McKinty (for Miller).				Attendance: 3,000

9 January 2000	**London Wasps (England)**	**49 – 17**	**(Ireland) Ulster**	Loftus Road, London
15:00	Try: Logan (2); Reed; Henderson; King; Shelbourne; Scrace	Report; Match centre	Try: Humphreys; Mason; Con: Mason (2); Pen: Mason	Attendance: 5,000
Ulster lineup: 1. Justin Fitzpatrick, 2. Richard Weir, 3. Joeli Veitayaki, 4. Paddy Johns, 5. Mark Blair, 6. Dion O'Cuinneagain, 7. Andy Ward, 8. Eric Miller, 9. Stephen Bell, 10. David Humphreys (c), 11. Tyrone Howe, 12. Jonny Bell, 13. Riaz Fredericks, 14. James Topping, 15. Simon Mason.; Replacements: Gary Longwell (for Blair, 78).				Attendance: 5,000

14 January 2000	**Ulster (Ireland)**	**27 – 36**	**(France) Bourgoin**	Ravenhill, Belfast
19:30	Try: Howe (2); Con: Mason; Pen: Mason (5)	Report; Match centre	Try: Boyet; Coux (2); Glas; Raschi; Drop: Boyet	Attendance: 6,000
Ulster lineup: 1. Justin Fitzpatrick, 2. Richard Weir, 3. Joeli Veitayaki, 4. Paddy Johns, 5. Gary Longwell, 6. Dion O'Cuinneagain, 7. Andy Ward, 8. Eric Miller, 9. Stephen Bell, 10. David Humphreys (c), 11. Tyrone Howe, 12. Jonny Bell, 13. Riaz Fredericks, 14. James Topping, 15. Simon Mason.; Replacements: Tony McWhirter (for Miller, 40), Mark Blair (for Ward, 55), Simon Best (for Veitayaki, 68), Jan Cunningham (for J. Topping, 70).				Attendance: 6,000

== 1999–2000 IRFU Interprovincial Championship ==
1999–00 Munster (21)
Team	P	W	D	L	F	A	BP	Pts	Status
Munster	6	6	0	0	242	103	5	29	Champions; qualified for 2000–01 Heineken Cup
Ulster	6	3	0	3	186	129	3	15	Qualified for 2000–01 Heineken Cup
Leinster	6	2	0	4	145	137	2	10	Qualified for 2000–01 Heineken Cup
Connacht	6	0	0	6	85	289	1	1	Qualified for 2000–01 European Challenge Cup

7 August 1999	**Connacht**	**9-50**	**Ulster**	The Sportsground, Belfast
	Pen: Elwood (3)	Report	Try: J. Topping; McWhirter; Cunningham; O'Cuinneagain; Howe; Clarke; Con: Mason (3); Pen: Mason (3)	Referee: M. White
Ulster lineup: 1. Justin Fitzpatrick, 2. Allen Clarke, 3. Gary Leslie, 4. Paddy Johns, 5. Gary Longwell, 6. Dion O'Cuinneagain, 7. Andy Ward, 8. Tony McWhirter, 9. Stephen Bell, 10. David Humphreys (c), 11. Tyrone Howe, 12. Jonny Bell, 13. Jan Cunningham, 14. James Topping, 15. Simon Mason.; Replacements: Mark Blair (for Longwell, 59), Eric Miller (for McWhirter, 59), Riaz Fredericks (for Howe, 66), Niall Malone (for Humphreys, 66), Simon Best (for Leslie, 71).				Referee: M. White

13 August 1999	**Leinster**	**15-26**	**Ulster**	Donnybrook, Dublin
	Pen: Everitt (5)	Report	Try: Howe; Mason; Con: Mason (2); Pen: Mason (3); Drop: Humphreys
Ulster lineup: 1. Justin Fitzpatrick, 2. Allen Clarke, 3. Gary Leslie, 4. Paddy Johns, 5. Gary Longwell, 6. Dion O'Cuinneagain, 7. Andy Ward, 8. Eric Miller, 9. Stephen Bell, 10. David Humphreys (c), 11. Tyrone Howe, 12. Jonny Bell, 13. Jan Cunningham, 14. James Topping, 15. Simon Mason.; Replacements: Tony McWhirter (for Miller, 48), Riaz Fredericks (for Cunningham, 58), Mark Blair (for Longwell, 60), Richard Weir (for Clarke, 83).

5 September 1999	**Ulster**	**24-25**	**Munster**	Upper Malone, Belfast
	Try: Bromley; Fredericks; Con: Mason; Pen: Mason (3); Drop: Humphreys	Report	Try: Mullins (2); Corkery; Con: O'Gara (2); Pen: O'Gara (2)
Ulster lineup: 1. Justin Fitzpatrick, 2. Allen Clarke, 3. Gary Leslie, 4. Paddy Johns, 5. Gary Longwell, 6. Dion O'Cuinneagain, 7. Andy Ward, 8. Eric Miller, 9. Andrew Matchett, 10. David Humphreys (c), 11. Spencer Bromley, 12. Jonny Bell, 13. Jan Cunningham, 14. James Topping, 15. Simon Mason.; Replacements: Richard Weir (for Clarke, 23), Tony McWhirter (for Miller, 55), Mark Blair (for Longwell, 50), Simon Best (for Leslie, 66), Riaz Fredericks (for Cunningham, 71).

29 October 1999	**Munster**	**36-19**	**Ulster**	Musgrave Park, Cork
	Try: O'Neill; Mullins; Con: O'Gara; Pen: O'Gara (8)	Report	Try: Topping; Con: Mason; Pen: Mason (4)
Ulster lineup: 1. Justin Fitzpatrick, 2. Allen Clarke, 3. Simon Best, 4. Mark Blair, 5. Gary Longwell, 6. Dion O'Cuinneagain, 7. Andy Ward, 8. Tony McWhirter, 9. Stephen Bell, 10. David Humphreys (c), 11. Spencer Bromley, 12. Riaz Fredericks, 13. Jonny Bell, 14. James Topping, 15. Simon Mason.; Replacements: Paddy Johns (for Blair, 46), Eric Miller (for O'Cuinneagain, 52), Lewis Johnston (for Best, 63), Jan Cunningham (for Topping, 72).

5 November 1999	**Ulster**	**44-22**	**Connacht**	Ravenhill, Belfast
	Try: Bromley (2); Blair; McWhirter; Cunningham; Ward; Con: Mason (4); Pen: Mason (2)	Report	Try: Steffert; Mostyn; Con: Elwood; Pen: Elwood
Ulster lineup: 1. Justin Fitzpatrick, 2. Allen Clarke, 3. Simon Best, 4. Paddy Johns, 5. Mark Blair, 6. Eric Miller, 7. Andy Ward, 8. Tony McWhirter, 9. Stephen Bell, 10. David Humphreys (c), 11. Spencer Bromley, 12. Jonny Bell, 13. Jan Cunningham, 14. James Topping, 15. Simon Mason.; Replacements: Stephen McKinty (for Miller, 40), Gary Longwell (for Blair, 60), Niall Malone (for Humphreys, 67).

12 November 1999	**Ulster**	**22-23**	**Leinster**	Ravenhill, Belfast
	Try: Bromley; Con: Mason; Pen: Mason (5)	Report	Try: Hickie; Pen: McHugh (6)
Ulster lineup: 1. Rab Irwin, 2. Richard Weir, 3. Simon Best, 4. Mark Blair, 5. Gary Longwell, 6. Eric Miller, 7. Andy Ward, 8. Tony McWhirter, 9. Mark Edwards, 10. David Humphreys (c), 11. Spencer Bromley, 12. Niall Malone, 13. Jan Cunningham, 14. Sheldon Coulter, 15. Simon Mason.; Replacements: Gary Leslie (for Irwin, 52), Allen Clarke (for Humphreys, 55), Stephen Bell (for Edwards, 63)

== Home attendance ==
Domestic League					European Cup					Total	
League	Fixtures	Average Attendance	Highest	Lowest	League	Fixtures	Average Attendance	Highest	Lowest	Total Attendance	Average Attendance
–	–	–	–	–	1999–00 Heineken Cup	3	**8,667**	12,000	6,000	26,000	**8,667**

== Friendlies ==
19 September 1999	**Ulster**	**25-16**	**Ireland XV**	Upper Malone, Belfast
	Try: Howe; Con: Mason; Pen: Mason (3)	Report	Try: Johns; O'Cuinneagain; Mostyn; O'Driscoll; Con: Humphreys; Pen: Humphreys
Ulster lineup: 1. Gary Leslie, 2. Richie Weir, 3. Simon Best, 4. Gary Longwell, 5. Mark Blair, 6. Stephen McKinty, 7. Derek Topping, 8. Tony McWhirter, 9. Mark Edwards, 10. Niall Malone, 11. Spencer Bromley, 12. Riaz Fredericks, 13. Jan Cunningham, 14. Sheldon Coulter, 15. Simon Mason.; Replacements: Stephen Ritchie (for Weir, 78'), Rab Irwin (for Leslie, 19'), Charlie Simpson (for Blair, 79'), Stuart Duncan (for McKinty, 71'), Andrew Matchett (for Edwards, 66'), Bryn Cunningham (for Malone, 35'), Tyrone Howe (for Coulter, 40').
Ireland XV: 1. Peter Clohessy, 2. Keith Wood, 3. Paul Wallace, 4. Paddy Johns, 5. Malcolm O'Kelly, 6. David Corkery, 7. Kieron Dawson, 8. Dion O'Cuinnegain, 9. Tom Tierney, 10. David Humphreys, 11. Matt Mostyn, 12. Kevin Maggs, 13. Brian O'Driscoll, 14. Justin Bishop, 15. Conor O'Shea.; Replacements: Gordon D'Arcy (for O'Shea, 71'), Jonathan Bell (for O'Driscoll, 68'), Justin Fitzpatrick (for Clohessy, 71), Jeremy Davidson (for O'Kelly, 68'), Eric Miller (for Corkery, 63') Andy Ward (for Dawson, 63').

== Ulster Rugby Awards ==
The Ulster Rugby Awards ceremony was held on 18 May 2000 at the La Mon House Hotel. Winners were:

- Bank of Ireland Ulster player of the year: Tony McWhirter
- Guinness personality of the year: David Humphreys
- Reneault schools player of the year: Matt McCullough
- Calor Gas youth player of the year: Martin Miller, Coleraine
- First Trust club of the year: Ballymena R.F.C.
- Coach of the year: Mark McCall, Ballynahinch RFC
- Dorrie B. Faulkner Award: Jack Lewis, Civil Service Rugby Club

== Ulster Women ==
The Ulster women's team secured a sponsorship deal with management consultancy HLEM Corporation. Hooker Ruth Scott was captain.

The 1999-2000 Women's Interprovincial Series was the first played in a full, 80-minute round-robin format. Coached by Johnny Neary, Ulster opened their campaign with a 10-0 win over Munster at Crowley Park, Galway, on 10 November 1999. They followed that up with a 10-0 victory over Connacht at Midleton on 4 December 1999. In their final match of the series they beat Leinster 22-0 in Dublin on 22 January 2000 to complete their championship-winning campaign. Lock Lorraine Noade captained the side in the final match after Ruth Scott was forced to drop to the bench due to illness.

An Ulster Invitation XV played a British Police team at Gibson Park, Belfast, on 24 March 2000, losing 25-0.

Ulster centre Suzanne Fleming was named as captain for Ireland at the 2000 FIRA Women's European Championship. Nine more Ulster players were named in the squad: prop Maura Coulter, hooker Ruth Scott, lock Lorraine Noade, back row forwards Rosie Gallagher and Rachel Reid, scrumhalf Jolene Morton, wings Rachel Boyd and Fiona Neary, and fullback Joy Sparkes.

=== Women's Interprovincial Series ===
20 November 1999	**Munster**	**0-10**	**Ulster**	Crowley Park, Galway
		Report	Try: Jolene Morton (2)	Referee: B Hutchinson, Connacht
Ulster lineup: 1. Maura Coulter (Cooke), 2. Ruth Scott (Cooke, c), 3. Joanne Bell (Carrickfergus), 4. Jill Henderson (Cooke), 5. Tara Lunny (Cooke), 6. Rachel Reid (Cooke), 7. Rosie Gallagher (Cooke), 8. Lorraine Noade (Cooke), 9. Jolene Morton (Liverpool University), 10. Gillian McAllister (Cooke), 11. Rachel Boyd (Cooke), 12. Suzanne Fleming (Cooke), 13. Laura Nicholl (Cooke), 14. Fiona Neary (Waterloo), 15. Joy Sparkes (Cooke).; Replacements: C Bonness (Carrickfergus, for Sparkes 74’), Lyn Bloomfield (Cooke, for McAllister 74’), J Quigg (Carrickfergus, for Reid 75’), T Russell (Cooke, for Gallagher 76’).				Referee: B Hutchinson, Connacht

4 December 1999	**Connacht**	**0-10**	**Ulster**	Midleton RFC
		Report	Try: Jill Henderson; Rachael Boyd
Ulster lineup: 1. Maura Coulter (Cooke), Ruth Scott (Cooke, c), 3 Joanne Bell (Carrickfergus), 4. Jill Henderson (Cooke), 5. Tara Lunny (Cooke), 6. Rachel Reid (Coole), 7. Rosie Gallagher (Coole), 8. Lorraine Noade (Cooke), 9. Lyn Bloomfield (Cooke)m 10. Gillian McAllister (Cooke), 11. Rachel Boyd (Cooke), 12. Suzanne Fleming (Cooke), 13. Laura Nicholl (Cooke), 14. Fiona Neary (Waterloo), 15. Joy Sparkes (Cooke).

22 January 2000	**Leinster**	**0-22**	**Ulster**	Old Belvedere R.F.C., Dublin
		Report	Try: Laura Nicholl; Lyn Bloomfield; Lorraine Noade; Con: Rachel Reid (2); Pen: Rachel Reid
Ulster lineup: 1. Jill Henderson (Cooke), 2. Maura Coulter (Cooke), 3. Joanne Bell (Carrickfergus), 4. Jackie McKernan, 5. Tara Lunny (Cooke), 6. Rachel Reid (Cooke), 7. Rosie Gallagher (Cooke), 8. Lorraine Noade (Cooke, c), 9. Emma Jeffreys, 10. Lyn Bloomfield, 11. Rachel Boyd (Cooke), 12. Suzanne Fleming (Cooke), 13. Laura Nicholl (Cooke), 14. Fiona Neary (Waterloo), 15. Joy Sparkes (Cooke).; Replacements: Gillian McAllister, C Bond, Jolene Morton, J Quigg, Lucy Fagan, R Livingstone, Ruth Scott.
