= 1999 Heineken Cup final =

Rugby match

1999 Heineken Cup Final
- Event: 1998–99 Heineken Cup
Ulster	Colomiers
(Ireland)	(France)
21	6
- Date: 30 January 1999
- Venue: Lansdowne Road, Dublin
- Man of the Match: Jonny Bell (Ulster)
- Referee: Clayton Thomas (Wales)
- Attendance: 49,000

The 1999 Heineken Cup Final was the final match of the 1998–99 Heineken Cup, the fourth season of Europe's top club rugby union competition. The match was played on 30 January 1999 at Lansdowne Road in Dublin. The match was contested by Ulster of Ireland and Colomiers of France. Ulster won the match 21–6.

Colomiers opened the scoring through a Laurent Labit penalty, but Ulster fullback Simon Mason responded with four of his own before half-time. After the break, captain and fly-half David Humphreys added a drop goal, before Colomiers recorded another penalty from substitute Mickaël Carré, but Mason was able to kick two more for Ulster to put the match out of Colomiers' reach. Ulster centre Jonny Bell was named man of the match.

== Match details ==
30 January 1999
14:45 GMT

Ulster (Ireland)	21–6	(France) Colomiers
Pen: Mason (6); Drop: Humphreys	Report; Full match on video	Pen: Labit; Carré

Lansdowne Road, Dublin
Attendance: 49,000
Referee: Clayton Thomas (Wales)

Ulster	Colomiers

FB	15	(Ireland) Simon Mason
RW	14	(Ireland) Sheldon Coulter
OC	13	(Ireland) Jan Cunningham	(substituted off) 44'
IC	12	(Ireland) Jonny Bell
LW	11	(Ireland) Andy Park
FH	10	(Ireland) David Humphreys (c)
SH	9	(Ireland) Andy Matchett
N8	8	(Ireland) Tony McWhirter	(substituted off) 75'
OF	7	(Ireland) Andy Ward
BF	6	(Ireland) Stephen McKinty
RL	5	(Ireland) Gary Longwell
LL	4	(Ireland) Mark Blair
TP	3	(Ireland) Rab Irwin	(substituted off) 73'
HK	2	(Ireland) Allen Clarke
LP	1	(Ireland) Justin Fitzpatrick
Substitutions:
CE	16	(Ireland) Stan McDowell	(substituted in) 44'
PR	17	(Ireland) Gary Leslie	(substituted in) 73'
FL	18	(Ireland) Derek Topping	(substituted in) 75'
FB	19	(Ireland) Bryn Cunningham
SH	20	(Ireland) Stephen Bell
LK	21	(Ireland) Stewart Duncan
HK	22	(Ireland) Ritchie Weir
Coach:
(Ireland) Harry Williams

FB	15	(France) Jean-Luc Sadourny (c)
RW	14	(France) Marc Biboulet
OC	13	(France) Sébastien Roque
IC	12	(France) Jérome Sieurac
LW	11	(France) Benjamin Lhande	(substituted off) 20'
FH	10	(France) Laurent Labit	(substituted off) 53'
SH	9	(France) Fabien Galthié
N8	8	(France) Stephane Peysson	(substituted off) 67'
OF	7	(France) Patrick Tabacco
BF	6	(France) Bernard de Giusti
RL	5	(France) Jean-Marc Lorenzi
LL	4	(France) Gildas Moro
TP	3	(France) Stéphane Graou
HK	2	(France) Marc Dal Maso
LP	1	(France) Stéphane Delpuech
Substitutions:
CE	16	(France) David Skrela	(substituted in) 20'
FH	17	(France) Mickaël Carre	(substituted in) 53'
FL	18	(France) Philippe Pueyo	(substituted in) 67'
SH	19	(France) Serge Milhas
HK	20	(France) Remi Tremoulet
N8	21	(France) Romain Rysman
PR	22	(France) Richard Nones
Coach:
(France) Jacques Brunel

Man of the Match:
Jonny Bell (Ulster)

== See also ==
- 1998–99 Heineken Cup
