= 1996 Five Nations Championship =

Rugby union competition

- Date: 20 January - 16 March 1996
- Countries: England; Ireland; France; Scotland; Wales

Tournament statistics
- Champions: England (22nd title)
- Triple Crown: England (19th title)
- Matches played: 10
- Tries scored: 30 (3 per match)
- Top point scorer: (England) Paul Grayson (64 points)
- Top try scorers: (Scotland) Michael Dods (France) Émile Ntamack (3 tries)

The 1996 Five Nations Championship was the sixty-seventh series of the rugby union Five Nations Championship, and the first in the sport's professional era, which officially began in August 1995. Including the previous incarnations as the Home Nations and Five Nations, this was the hundred-and-second series of the northern hemisphere rugby union championship. Ten matches were played over five weekends from 20 January to 16 March. England were the winners, losing only the first game with France, thus missing the Grand Slam, but winning the Triple Crown. France went into the final week needing a victory to clinch the championship themselves thanks to superior points difference, but lost by a single point to Wales, who not only avoided a whitewash but climbed above Ireland on points difference in doing so.

Scotland missed out on a fourth Grand Slam after losing to England at Murrayfield, this was the second successive season Scotland lost out on a Grand Slam.

== Participants ==
The teams involved were:

Nation	Venue	City	Head coach	Captain
England	Twickenham	London	Jack Rowell	Will Carling
France	Parc des Princes	Paris	Jean-Claude Skrela	Philippe Saint-André
Ireland	Lansdowne Road	Dublin	Murray Kidd	Jim Staples/Niall Hogan
Scotland	Murrayfield	Edinburgh	Jim Telfer	Rob Wainwright
Wales	National Stadium	Cardiff	Kevin Bowring	Jonathan Humphreys

== Standings ==
Pos	Team	Pld	W	D	L	PF	PA	PD	Pts
1	England	4	3	0	1	79	54	+25	6
2	Scotland	4	3	0	1	60	56	+4	6
3	France	4	2	0	2	89	57	+32	4
4	Wales	4	1	0	3	62	82	−20	2
5	Ireland	4	1	0	3	65	106	−41	2

== Results ==
20 January 1996
15:00

France	15–12	England
Pen: Lacroix (3); Drops:: Castaignède; Lacroix		Pen: Grayson (2); Drops: Grayson (2)

Parc des Princes, Paris
Attendance: 45,000
Referee: David McHugh (Ireland)

20 January 1996
15:00

Ireland	10–16	Scotland
Tries: Clohessy; Con: Elwood; Pen: Elwood		Tries: Dods; McKenzie; Pen: Dods; Drops: Townsend

Lansdowne Road, Dublin
Referee: Brian Campsall (England)

3 February 1996
15:00

England	21–15	Wales
Tries: Guscott; R. Underwood; Con: Grayson; Pen: Grayson (3)		Tries: Howley; Taylor; Con: A. Thomas; Pen: A. Thomas

Twickenham, London
Referee: Ken McCartney (Scotland)

3 February 1996
15:00

Scotland	19–14	France
Tries: Dods (2); Pen: Dods (3)		Tries: Benazzi; Pen: Castaignède; Lacroix (2)

Murrayfield, Edinburgh
Attendance: 65,000
Referee: Clayton Thomas (Wales)

17 February 1996
15:00

France	45–10	Ireland
Tries: Accoceberry; Campan; Castel (2); Ntamack (2); Saint-André; Con: Castaignède (5)		Tries: Penalty try Con: Humphreys; Pen: Humphreys

Parc des Princes, Paris
Referee: Ed Morrison (England)

17 February 1996
15:00

Wales	14–16	Scotland
Tries: Proctor; Pen: A. Thomas (3)		Tries: Townsend; Con: Dods; Pen: Dods (3)

National Stadium, Cardiff
Attendance: 47,000
Referee: Joel Dume (France)

2 March 1996
15:00

Ireland	30–17	Wales
Tries: Corkery; Fulcher; Geoghegan; Woods; Con: Mason (2); Pen: Mason (2)		Tries: I. Evans (2); Con: A. Thomas (2); Pen: A. Thomas

Lansdowne Road, Dublin
Referee: Didier Mene (France)

2 March 1996
15:00

Scotland	9–18	England
Pen: Dods (3)		Pen: Grayson (6)

Murrayfield, Edinburgh
Attendance: 67,000
Referee: Derek Bevan (Wales)

16 March 1996
15:00

England	28–15	Ireland
Tries: Sleightholme; Con: Grayson; Pen: Grayson (6); Drops: Grayson		Pen: Mason (4); Drops: Humphreys

Twickenham, London
Attendance: 75,000
Referee: Edward Murray (Scotland)

16 March 1996
15:00

Wales	16–15	France
Tries: Howley; Con: Jenkins; Pen: Jenkins (3)		Tries: Castaignède; Ntamack; Con: Castaignède; Pen: Castaignède

National Stadium, Cardiff
Attendance: 52,000
Referee: Brian Stirling (Ireland)
