= Stéphane Graou =

French rugby union player (born 1966)

- Born: 1 May 1966 (age 60) Auch, France
- Height: 5 ft 10 in (178 cm)
- Weight: 238 lb (108 kg)

Rugby union career
- Position: Prop
International career
Years	Team	Apps	(Points)
1992–95	France	8	(0)

Stéphane Graou (born 1 May 1966) is a French former rugby union international.

Born in Auch, Graou was a prop and came through the youth system of hometown club FC Auch. He attained eight France caps in the early 1990s, including two appearances on the 1993 tour of South Africa. After joining US Colomiers in 1995, Graou played in European competition and was a member of the club's 1997–98 European Challenge Cup win, also appearing in the 1999 Heineken Cup final loss to Ulster.

Graou's son Paul plays professional rugby as a scrum-half.

== See also ==
- List of France national rugby union players
