= Clinton van Rensburg =

South African rugby union player

- Born: 9 October 1975 (age 50) Cape Town, South Africa
- Height: 193 cm (6 ft 4 in)
- Weight: 103 kg (227 lb; 16 st 3 lb)

Rugby union career
Senior career
Years	Team	Apps	(Points)
- Western Province
- Natal Sharks
- Orange Free State
1998-99	Ulster	8	(5)
1999-2000	Swansea		
2000	Sharks		
2001	Cats		
2005-06	Eastern Province Elephants		
2006-07	Tarbes Pyrénées Rugby		

Clinton van Rensburg (born 9 October 1975) is a South African former rugby union player.

A native of Cape Town, he played for Western Province, Natal Sharks and the Orange Free State in the Currie Cup. In 1998 he linked up with South African coach Andre Bester at Irish club Ballymena, making him available to play for Ulster. He played inside centre for the province, replacing Mark McCall after his career-ending injury. He made two appearances in the IRFU Interprovincial Championship, and featured in all six pool games in Ulster's 1998-99 Heineken Cup-winning campaign, scoring a try against Toulouse, but was unavailable for the knockout stages, having signed a contract with Swansea.

He went on to play for the Sharks and Cats in Super 12, the Eastern Province Elephants in the Currie Cup, and Tarbes in the Pro D2. As of 2024, he coaches rugby at Rondebosch Boys' High School in Cape Town.
