= Michael Dods =

Scotland international rugby union player

- Born: Michael Dods; 30 December 1968 (age 57) Galashiels, Scottish Borders, Scotland
- Height: 5 ft 10 in (1.78 m)
- Weight: 11 st 9 lb (74 kg)
- Notable relative: Peter Dods

Rugby union career
- Position: Fullback or Wing
Senior career
Years	Team	Apps	(Points)
- Gala
–	Northampton RFC		
International career
Years	Team	Apps	(Points)
1994–1996	Scotland	8	(80)
National sevens team
Years	Team		Comps
1993	England		1993 Sevens World Cup

Michael Dods (born Galashiels, 30 December 1968) was a Scottish rugby union player. He played as a wing and as a fullback.

He played for Gala and Northampton RFC.

He had 8 caps for Scotland, from 1994 to 1996, scoring 3 tries, 1 conversion and 21 penalties, an amazing aggregate of 80 points. He played 5 times at the Five Nations Championship, 1 in 1994 and 4 in 1996. In the 1996 Five Nations Championship, he scored 3 tries, 1 conversion and 10 penalties, 47 points in aggregate. He was the top try scorer in the competition, with 3 tries. His brother Peter Dods was also capped for Scotland.
