= Jean-Luc Sadourny =

France international rugby union player (born 1966)

- Born: 26 August 1966 (age 60) Toulouse, France
- Height: 1.81 m (5 ft 11 in)
- Weight: 91 kg (14 st 5 lb)

Rugby union career
- Position: Fullback
Amateur team(s)
Years	Team	Apps	(Points)
1984-1995	US Colomiers		
Senior career
Years	Team	Apps	(Points)
1995-2003	US Colomiers		
International career
Years	Team	Apps	(Points)
1991-2001	France	71	(86)

Jean-Luc Sadourny (born 26 August 1966 in Toulouse) is a former French rugby union footballer and a current coach. He played as a fullback. He was nicknamed The Old Woman (La Vieille) and he is generally considered one of the best French players of his generation, a fair successor to Serge Blanco in his position.

Sadourny played all his career at US Colomiers, which is based in Colomiers, a suburb of Toulouse. His best results with his club are as runners-up in both the 1999 European Rugby Cup and the 1999–2000 French Rugby Union Championship.

He had 71 caps for France, from 1991 to 2001. He scored 15 tries and 4 drop goals, in an aggregate of 86 points, during his international career. The French fullback was selected for the 1991 Rugby World Cup, playing a single match, and for the 1995 Rugby World Cup, playing all the five matches. He helped France to reach the 3rd place in this event. He won the Five Nations twice, with grand slams, in 1997 and 1998. Sadourny is also remembered for scoring the famous "try from the end of the world" against the All Blacks in 1994. In the second and final Test of France's tour of New Zealand, France were trailing with about 3 minutes to play and were pinned deep in their own end by a tactical kick. They counter-attacked down the field, with the ball touched by nine different French players before Sadourny touched down to give Les Bleus the points that secured a 23-20 win and a 2–0 series win. As of 2025, this remains the last time New Zealand have lost at Eden Park.

After retiring as a player, Sadourny entered the coaching ranks at Colomiers. He left to take over the reins at Blagnac for the 2007–08 season, leading them to an appearance in the Fédérale 1 final, where they lost to his former club Colomiers. As is standard practice in France, both finalists earned promotion to Rugby Pro D2 for the 2008–09 season. However, Sadourny chose not to stay with Blagnac, moving to Fédérale 3 club Stade Saint-Gaudinois for 2008–09, where he currently remains.

In 2010, Sadourny opened his own restaurant, the Sadourny Café, in Colomiers.
