= Jonathan Moffett (rugby union) =

Irish rugby union player (born 1937)

- Full name: Jonathan Wallace Moffett
- Born: 30 April 1937 (age 89) Belfast, Northern Ireland
- School: Campbell College
- University: University of Aberdeen
- Occupation: Orchard owner

Rugby union career
- Position: Scrum-half
International career
| Years | Team | Apps | (Points) |
| 1961 | Ireland | 2 | (10) |

Jonathan Wallace Moffett (born 30 April 1937) is a former Ireland international rugby union player.

Raised on a farm in Ballyeasborough outside Belfast, Moffett attended Campbell College and was an Ulster Schools' Cup-winning captain, before gaining a blue with the University of Aberdeen in Scotland He played scrum-half for Ballymena and won an Ireland call up in the 1961 Five Nations as a replacement for Andy Mulligan, who had contracted measles. Capped twice, Moffett had a starring role on debut against England at Lansdowne Road, kicking two penalties and a difficult conversion in a 11–8 Ireland win, to retain his place for the next match against Scotland at Murrayfield.

Moffett immigrated to New Zealand in 1963 and captained the Hastings rugby club. He worked as a science teacher at Lindisfarne College, then set up a 500-acre orchard in Hawke's Bay, which grew into a family business.

== See also ==
- List of Ireland national rugby union players
