= Allen Clarke (rugby union) =

Irish rugby union player

- Born: Allen Thomas Hartley Clarke; 29 July 1967 (age 59) Dungannon, Northern Ireland
- Height: 1.73 m (5 ft 8 in)
- School: Royal School Dungannon
- University: Northampton University

Rugby union career
- Position: Hooker
Amateur team(s)
Years	Team	Apps	(Points)
1998–2001	Dungannon		
- Correct as of 1995–2001
Senior career
Years	Team	Apps	(Points)
1989–1995	Northampton Saints		
1994–1996	Ulster	10	(0)
1996–1998	Northampton Saints		
1998–2001	Ulster	27	(10)
- Correct as of 13 April 2018
International career
Years	Team	Apps	(Points)
1995–1998	Ireland	8	(0)
- Correct as of 13 April 2018
Coaching career
- Years: Team
- 2002–2005: Ulster (Academy manager)
- 2004–2007: Ulster (Assistant)
- 2007–2012: IRFU (Elite Player Development Manager)
- 2012–2017: Ulster (Forwards coach)
- 2017–2018: Ospreys (Forwards coach)
- 2018–2019: Ospreys
- 2020–2021: Dallas Jackals
- 2021–: Seattle Seawolves
- Correct as of 1 May 2023

Allen Clarke (born 29 July 1967) is an Irish rugby union coach and former player. He is the current head coach of the Seattle Seawolves of Major League Rugby (MLR).

He is the former head coach of Welsh professional side the Ospreys in the Pro14, having previously been the team's forwards coach.

== Playing career ==
During his playing career, Clarke was a hooker. He was capped at international level by Ireland, playing for the senior team eight times from 1995 to 1998. Clarke spent the much of his professional playing career with his native province of Ulster and played in the 1999 Heineken Cup Final victory against Colomiers, the first ever European title for an Irish side. He also spent several seasons with Northampton Saints in England across two spells, having studied at the university in the town and later worked as a teacher there. Clarke was forced to retire due to injury in 2001.

== Coaching ==
After his retirement from playing Clarke became a part of the Ulster coaching system, helping to establish the province's academy system. He was promoted to assistant coach under his former teammate Mark McCall, and served in this role during Ulster's 2005–06 Celtic League title-winning season. Following this success Clarke was hired by the IRFU as an Elite Player Development Manager, a newly created role with the directive of developing young Irish players. He also served as head coach of the Irish under-20 team and the Irish 'A' side during his time with the union.

Following five years in his role with the IRFU, Clarke returned to Ulster in 2012 as an assistant under Mark Anscombe. Clarke continued in this role under Anscombe's successors, Neil Doak and Les Kiss. During his second stint with Ulster Doak continued to be involved with the Irish set up on occasion, serving as head coach of Emerging Ireland during their successful 2015 Tbilisi Cup campaign.

Clarke left Ulster in 2017, joining the Ospreys as forwards coach under Steve Tandy. In January 2018, Tandy was sacked, with Clarke named as his successor on an interim basis. Following a successful stint in the role, Clarke became the head coach position on a permanent basis, signing a three-year deal with the region in April 2018, but was terminated in November 2019 after a dire start to their 2019–20 season.

In June 2020, Clarke was announced as the head coach of the Dallas Jackals, a new Major League Rugby expansion team. The team's entry into the league was delayed to 2022 and Clarke went to the Seattle Seawolves on loan beginning in May 2021.
