= Mark Blair (rugby union) =

Irish rugby union player

- School: The Royal School, Armagh
- University: Heriot-Watt University

Rugby union career
- Position: Lock
Amateur team(s)
Years	Team	Apps	(Points)
- City of Armagh RFC
- Currie RFC
- Ballymena R.F.C.
Senior career
Years	Team	Apps	(Points)
1997-98	Edinburgh Reivers		
1998-2003	Ulster	52	(35)
2003-04	RC Narbonne	9	(10)
2004-06	Border Reivers	8	(5)

Mark Blair is an Irish former rugby union player, who played lock professionally for Edinburgh, Ulster, RC Narbonne and the Border Reivers.

He attended The Royal School, Armagh, and after leaving school attended technical collage for year while playing for City of Armagh RFC, and represented Ulster at under-20 and under-21 levels. He went to Heriot-Watt University in Edinburgh, and played rugby for Currie RFC. He had a trial for Scotland, for whom he qualified through residency. He played club rugby in New Zealand in 1996 and 1997, and was selected a few times for Counties, where he played alongside Jonah Lomu.

He signed a professional contract with Edinburgh Reivers for 1997-98, The following season he had offers from Edinburgh and Ulster, and chose to sign for Ulster, joining Ballymena R.F.C. However, he sustained an ankle ligament injury playing five-a-side football in the summer, arrived unfit, and began the season for Ulster behind part-timer Murtagh Rea. He eventually won a starting spot in the second row alongside Gary Longwell playing in eight successive wins on the way to Ulster's victory in the 1999 Heineken Cup Final.

He made 55 appearances for Ulster over five seasons, and helped Ballymena win the All-Ireland League in 2003, before joining RC Narbonne ahead of the 2003-04 season. He had signed for three years, but left after a single season after the new coach objected to him going home to attend his brother's wedding. He returned to Scotland, signing a two-year deal with the Border Reivers. The team was disbanded at the end of his second season, and he retired from professional rugby, although he continued to play club rugby with Currie until about 2009. He set up a property development company with his brother-in-law, and worked for the IRFU Exiles programme until 2017.
