= Justin Fitzpatrick =

Ireland international rugby union player

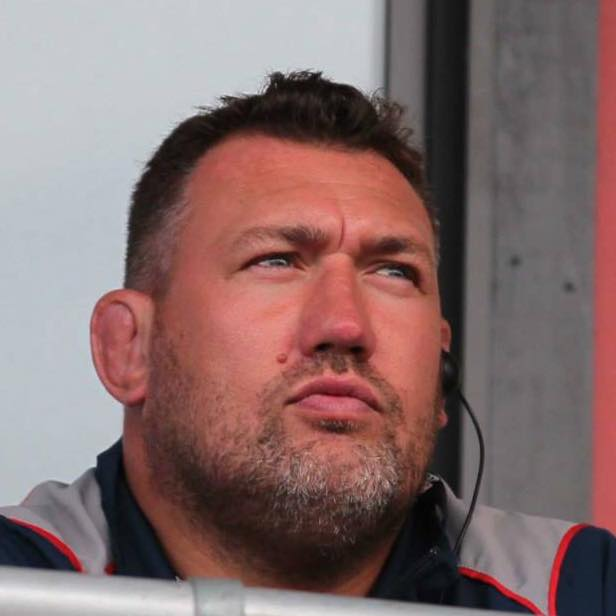
- Full name: Justin Michael Fitzpatrick
- Born: 21 November 1973 (age 52) Chichester, West Sussex
- Height: 1.88 m (6 ft 2 in)
- Weight: 117 kg (18 st 6 lb; 258 lb)
- School: The Regis School
- University: Brunel University London

Rugby union career
- Position: Loosehead prop
Amateur team(s)
Years	Team	Apps	(Points)
1998-2010	Dungannon RFC		
Senior career
Years	Team	Apps	(Points)
1994-1998	London Irish		
1998-2003	Ulster	73	
2003-2005	Castres Olympique	38	
2005-2010	Ulster	79	
International career
Years	Team	Apps	(Points)
1998-2003	Ireland	26	
Coaching career
- Years: Team
- 2010-2013: Dungannon RFC
- 2013-2017: Seattle Saracens
- 2017-2019: Houston Sabercats

Justin Michael Fitzpatrick (born 21 November 1973) is an Irish former rugby union player who most recently was head coach of the Houston SaberCats of Major League Rugby (MLR). He previously played for London Irish, Castres Olympique, Dungannon RFC & Ulster. He had also held several other coaching positions, including head coach of Dungannon RFC and the Seattle Saracens, and assistant coach of the United States national rugby union team.

== Playing career ==
Fitzpatrick joined London Irish at the age of 16, and played for their first team from 1994. Born in Chichester, West Sussex, England, he qualified for Ireland through his mother, and he was selected for Ireland's 1998 tour of South Africa, making his debut in a 13–37 defeat against the Springboks on 13 June 1998. He went on to win 26 caps.

In 1998 Ireland coach Warren Gatland began a drive for Irish-qualified players to be based in Ireland. Fitzpatrick moved to Dungannon RFC, making him available to play for Ulster. With Ulster, he was part of the team that won the 1998–99 Heineken Cup, defeating Colomiers 21–6 in the final before 49,500 fans at Lansdowne Road in Dublin. He also helped coach Willie Anderson's Dungannon side win Ulster's first All-Ireland League title in 2001, beating favorites Cork Constitution in the final.

In 2003, after making 73 appearances for Ulster, he moved to Castres Olympique, and in his first season there he helped the club win the Coupe de France, beating CS Bourgoin-Jallieu 27–26 in the final. He returned to Ulster in 2005. He was forced to retire through injury in 2010.

== Coaching ==
On his retirement from playing, Fitzpatrick became director of rugby at Dungannon RFC, assisted by player-coach Kieran Campbell. He led them to win the Ulster Senior League twice and the Ulster Senior Cup the first time Dungannon had won the "double". He also took them to their first All-Ireland Cup Final, losing a closely contested match against Bruff Rugby Union Football Club 24–18. During this time was invited to join Philip Doyle's staff as an assistant coach for the Irish women's national team, and spent a month as head coach of the Pakistan national rugby union team for the HSBC Asian 5 Nations in Kuala Lumpur.

In 2013 he became head coach of Seattle Saracens then known as Seattle OPSB. During his first spring season, Fitzpatrick guided the club to USA Rugby Elite Cup semifinal and a USA Rugby Division 1 final in XV's, and assisted Waisale Serevi and Ben Gollings guide the club to win the National 7's title. Soon after arriving in Seattle, he was appointed forwards coach for the Collegiate All-Americans, and in October 2013 he became assistant coach for the U.S. national rugby team, spending three years in the position and helping the team qualify, prepare and compete in the 2015 Rugby World Cup.

In Spring 2017, he was recruited by the Houston SaberCats to become their head coach and build Houston's first professional rugby team to compete in the inaugural season of Major League Rugby. He left the position on 2 May 2019.
