= Duncan Hodge =

Scotland international rugby union player & coach

- Born: Duncan William Hodge; 18 August 1974 (age 52) Dumfries, Scotland
- Height: 6 ft 0 in (1.83 m)
- Weight: 14 st 0 lb (89 kg)
- School: Merchiston Castle School

Rugby union career
- Position: Fly-half
Amateur team(s)
Years	Team	Apps	(Points)
- Watsonians
Senior career
Years	Team	Apps	(Points)
2005–2007	Edinburgh	?	(?)
2003–2005	Leeds Tykes	18	(115)
1996–2003	Edinburgh	?	(?)
- Correct as of 2012-12-14
International career
Years	Team	Apps	(Points)
1997–2002	Scotland	26	(123)
- Correct as of 2012-12-14
Coaching career
- Years: Team
- 2012–2015: Scotland
- 2015–2021: Edinburgh
- 2021: Fiji

Duncan Hodge (born 18 August 1974) is a Scottish former internationalist rugby union player. He gained 26 full caps for Scotland.

== Playing career ==
Hodge was born in Dumfries, Scotland and educated at Merchiston Castle School in Edinburgh. He went on to represent Durham as a student, competing in the same team as Will Greenwood and Tim Stimpson.

As a 19-year-old he was given the choice of touring Zimbabwe and South Africa with Scotland's National Cricket team, or playing under-21 national rugby and completing his university exams. Hodge chose the latter option as he had already decided that he wanted to focus on a full-time career in sport.

He played for Watsonians until the creation of the Scottish Pro sides when he was contracted to play for Edinburgh Rugby.

He played for Edinburgh Gunners twice sandwiched around a two-year spell with Leeds Tykes. His second season in Leeds was ruined by injury. where he only managed one league appearance that year.

== International honours ==
Hodge won his first full cap as a replacement for Craig Chalmers against France in Paris in 1997, having already booked a place in Scottish rugby lore when his drop goal in the dying seconds secured Scotland A's victory over the 1994 Springboks. He has made 13 appearances for Scotland A, captaining them to their 40–35 win over Argentina in November 2001.

Hodge in total won 26 caps playing at fly-half for the Scottish rugby union side between 1997 and 2002. As well as his games in Europe he played for Scotland in tours in Australia (1998), New Zealand (2000), and North America (2002). It was on the North American tour when he played in his last full internationals against Canada in Vancouver and USA in San Francisco. He also made two appearances in the 1999 World Cup. He scored 123 points for the national side from six tries, 15 conversions, 20 penalties and one drop goal.

His finest moment was when he converted his own try and kicked four penalties to score all the points for Scotland in the 2000 Calcutta Cup 19–13 win against England. This was in the inaugural season of the Six Nations at Murrayfield, and the first victory for Scotland against England since 1990 prevented England from completing a 6 Nations Championship Grand Slam and Scotland from finishing bottom of the table.

== Coaching ==
Duncan Hodge travelled to the 2011 Rugby World Cup in New Zealand as Scotland's kicking coach, and during the 2015 Rugby World Cup he acted as attack coach. After the World Cup, he joined Edinburgh Rugby.
