= Ballymena R.F.C. =

Irish rugby union club based in Ballymena, Co.Antrim, N.Ireland

(Northern Ireland) Ballymena
- Full name: Ballymena Rugby Football Club
- Union: (Ireland) IRFU
- Branch: Ulster
- Founded: 1887; 139 years ago
- Region: Antrim
- Ground(s): Eaton Park, Ballymena (Capacity: 1,000)
- Chairman: David J McNeill
- President: Peter Crabbe
- Coach(es): John Nicholl, Michael Stevenson, Andrew Warwick, Gareth Fisher, Matthew Dick, Alasdair Frazer
- League: All-Ireland Div. 2A
- 2024–25: 8th.
Team kit

Official website
- ballymenarugbyclub.com

Ballymena Rugby Football Club is a rugby union club based in the town of Ballymena, Northern Ireland, playing in Division 2A of the All-Ireland League. It is affiliated to the Ulster branch of the Irish Rugby Football Union. The club fields five adult teams and an under-20s team. In youth rugby, there are under-18s, under-16s and under-14s teams.

== Formation ==
Ballymena RFC was first affiliated to the Northern Branch of the Irish Rugby Football Union in 1887, but the Club as we know it today, began after the First World War, in 1922, and entered the Junior League in the 1923–24 season, playing their games in the local Demesne. Within the next 10 years, they twice won both the Provincial Towns· Cup and the Junior Challenge Cup, and even competed, albeit with little success, in the Senior Challenge Cup. The Post War Era at the end of the Second World War, the Club reformed, and were now playing at the Showgrounds, using the changing facilities provided by Ballymena Academy, whose Headmaster, the late W.H. Mol, had taken over the position of Club President. Ballymena a Senior Club After a number of successful years, which produced successive Junior League Championship wins in 1950–51 and 1951–52, an application was made to the Ulster Branch for admission to the senior ranks, and so, in the 1952–53 season, Ballymena became a Senior Club. Two years later, they moved to their present home at Eaton Park, then a modest 9 acres, which they had acquired from the Mid-Antrim Sports Association, and where other sports like Cricket, Tennis, Men's Hockey and later Athletics, were being catered for. Only the first of these has survived, and continues to flourish as a very successful and thriving Section of the Club. The following couple of decades saw Eaton Park expand to 30-odd acres, and the erection of a pavilion, a function hall, training floodlights, a grandstand and a clubhouse with kitchen facilities. Success After acquiring senior status in 1952, Ballymena had to wait ten years for their next playing success, winning the Senior Cup in 1962–63, benefiting from the leadership and superb place-kicking of captain Jonathan Moffett. This was followed by a number of lean years, which, however, still produced Internationals like Syd Millar, a past-President of the I.R.F.U., and a past-Chairman of the International Rugby Board, Barton McCallan and the legendary W.J. McBride.

Trail Blazers in 1970, Ballymena blazed a trail in Irish rugby by appointing a principal coach, Maurice Crabbe, adopting a squad system and setting up a club coaching scheme, and the stage was set for the golden decade that was to follow, during which Ballymena were arguably the foremost club in Ulster and Ireland. They contributed many players to the Ulster Provincial side and to the Irish International team during this period, which came to a climax in 1980 with a major Club tour to Canada.

== Honours ==
- All-Ireland League: 1
  - 2002–03
- Ulster Senior Cup: 14
  - 1962–63, 1969–70, 1974–75, 1976–77, 1988–89, 1989–90, 1990–91, 1995–96, 1996–97, 2002–03, 2003–04, 2004–05, 2011–12, 2012–13
- Ulster Senior League: 14 (3 shared)
  - 1972–73 (shared), 1975–76, 1977–78, 1978–79, 1985–86, 1988–89, 1989–90, 1996–97, 1997–98, 2000–01, 2001–02, 2004–05 (shared), 2005–06 (shared), 2015–16
- Ulster Towns Cup: 13
  - 1927–28, 1931–32, 1952–53, †1962–63, †1969–70, †1972–73, †1973–74, †1976–77, †1978–79, †1990–91, †1993–94, †1999–2000, †2004–05
- Ulster Junior Cup: 8
  - 1928–29, 1929–30, †1971–72, †1972–73, †1997–98, †1999–2000, †2000–01, †2004–05

† Won by 2nd XV

== Notable players ==
See also Category:Ballymena R.F.C. players

=== Ireland ===
The following Ballymena players have represented Ireland at full international level.

- Jonny Bell
- Isaac Boss
- David Humphreys
- Willie John McBride
- Matt McCullough
- Syd Millar
- Jonathan Moffett
- Dion O'Cuinnegain
- Trevor Ringland
- Gary Longwell
- Steve Smith
- James Topping
- Jamie Smith
- Andrew Trimble
- Bryan Young
- Luke Marshall
- Chris Henry

=== British and Irish Lions ===
The following Ballymena players have also represented the British and Irish Lions .

- Willie John McBride: 1962, 1966, 1968, 1971, 1974
- Syd Millar: 1962, 1968
- Trevor Ringland: 1983
- Steve Smith: 1989
- Tommy Seymour: 2017
