= Jan Cunningham =

Irish rugby union player

- Born: Jan Cunningham
- School: Bangor Grammar School
- University: Trinity College Dublin
- Notable relative: Bryn Cunningham (brother)

Rugby union career
- Position(s): Wing, centre, fullback
Amateur team(s)
Years	Team	Apps	(Points)
1993-1997	Dublin University		
1997-1999	Ballymena R.F.C.		
1999-	Dungannon RFC		
Senior career
Years	Team	Apps	(Points)
1995-2002	Ulster	54	
- Correct as of 2 December 2022

Jan Cunningham is an Irish former rugby union player, who played centre, wing and fullback for Ulster.

He was educated at Bangor Grammar School, where he captained the 1st XV at rugby and the 1st XI at cricket. He captained Ulster Schools, was part of the Ireland Schools team that won the Triple Crown.

He studied Law at Trinity College Dublin, playing rugby for Dublin University, and was selected for Ireland at under-19 and under-21 level. He made his debut for Ulster against Munster in 1995. After completing his law degree in 1997, he joined Ballymena R.F.C. And signed a full-time contract with Ulster. He played all but one of Ulster's Heineken Cup matches in the first four seasons of the competition. He was part of the Ulster team who won the 1999 Heineken Cup, scoring three tries during the campaign. He started the final, but fractured his jaw and cheekbone in a tackle early in the first half, and was withdrawn at half-time. Internationally, played for Ireland 'A' and Ireland Sevens, and was an unused substitute for the senior Ireland team in a friendly against Canada in 1997. At club level, he moved to Dungannon RFC before the 1999-2000 season, and was part of the Dungannon team who were the first Ulster club to win the All-Ireland League in 2001.

He fell out of favour at Ulster under head coach Alan Solomons, who left him out of the squad for the 2001–02 Heineken Cup. His final appearance for the province came in December 2002, after a series of injuries left the team short of centres for a Heineken Cup tie against Biarritz Olympique, scoring a try in a narrow defeat. His contract was up at the end of the 2002-03 season, and he was not offered a new one. He had made 54 appearances for the province. He resumed his legal career as a trainee solicitor with Millar McCall Wylie, rising to become a partner at the firm in 2011. His younger brother Bryn also played for Ulster, and has been the team's Operations Director since 2015.
