= Jonny Bell (rugby union) =

Ireland international rugby union player

Jonathan Bell
- Full name: Jonathan Charles Bell
- Born: 7 February 1974 (age 52) Belfast, Northern Ireland
- Height: 5 ft 11 in (1.80 m)
- School: Coleraine Academical Institution

Rugby union career
Amateur team(s)
Years	Team	Apps	(Points)
- Dungannon
Senior career
Years	Team	Apps	(Points)
1994–1997	Ulster	12	(10)
1997–1998	Northampton Saints	41	
1998–2006	Ulster	76	(25)
International career
Years	Team	Apps	(Points)
1994–2003	Ireland	36	(40)
- Correct as of 31 August 2003
National sevens team
Years	Team		Comps
1997	Ireland		Hong Kong
- Correct as of 24 March 1997
Coaching career
- Years: Team
- 2008–2011: Ulster (Elite Player Development Officer)
- 2011–2015: Ulster (Assistant coach)
- 2015–20: Gloucester (Defence Coach)
- 2017: Gloucester (Interim Head Coach)
- 2020-2021: Glasgow Warriors (Attack Coach)
- 2021-2022: Worcester Warriors (Defence Coach)
- 2022-25: Ulster (Defence Coach)

Jonathan Charles Bell (born 7 February 1974) is an Irish rugby union coach and former player. He played centre for Ulster, with whom he won the 1998–99 Heineken Cup, Northampton and Ireland, and has coached at Ulster, Gloucester, Glasgow Warriors and Worcester Warriors. From the 2022–23 season until February 2025 he was the defence coach at Ulster.

== Education ==
Bell went to school at Coleraine Academical Institution, playing rugby there. He later gained a PGCE teaching qualification.

== Playing career ==
Bell first played for Ulster as an 18-year-old. He played one season for Northampton Saints in England in 1997–98. He returned to Ulster and in 1999 was part of the Ulster team that won the Heineken Cup, putting in a man-of-the-match performance against Colomiers in the final. Internationally, Bell made his Ireland debut against Australia on 5 June 1994. He earned 36 caps for Ireland between 1994 and 2003, and played at two World Cups. Bell played his last game for Ireland against Italy on 30 August 2003. He also played for the Irish sevens team, appearing in the 1997 World Cup in Hong Kong.

Bell retired from professional rugby in 2006 following struggles with injuries.

== Coaching career ==
Following his retirement from playing, Bell became a PE teacher, working at Campbell College in Belfast where he coached the school's rugby side.

He then became an Elite Player Development Officer for the academy of his former side Ulster, and later an assistant coach.

In 2015, Bell left Ulster to join English Premiership side Gloucester, where his former Ulster and Ireland teammate David Humphreys was Director of Rugby. He was appointed as the side's defence coach. In March 2017, Bell was appointed head coach on an interim basis for the remainder of the 2016–17 season, following the dismissal of Laurie Fisher. Till the end of season 2019-20 he was defence coach. He took over as an attack coach for Glasgow Warriors for the 2020–21 season.

On 18 May 2021, Bell returned to the Premiership with Worcester Warriors as their new defence coach from the 2021–22 season. He returned to Ulster as defence coach for the 2022–23 season, leaving to take up a non-rugby opportunity in February 2025.
