= Stéphane Ougier =

France international rugby union player (born 1967)

- Born: 5 October 1967 (age 59) Toulouse, France
- Height: 6 ft 3 in (191 cm)
- Weight: 202 lb (92 kg)

Rugby union career
- Position: Fullback
International career
Years	Team	Apps	(Points)
1992–97	France	4	(4)

Stéphane Ougier (born 5 October 1967) is a French former rugby union international.

A native of Toulouse, Ougier spent most of his career at hometown club Stade Toulousain, where he played in six French Championship-winning teams. He also featured in Stade Toulousain's 1996 Heineken Cup final win over Cardiff.

Capped four times for France, Ougier debuted at fullback against Romania at Le Havre in 1992, kicking two conversions in a 19-point win, then later that year played against the Pumas on a tour of Argentina. In 1993, Ougier was a substitute in a Five Nations loss to England at Twickenham Stadium. His final appearance came as a winger against Italy in 1997.

Ougier was involved in a road accident on 25 May 1995 which caused the death of a 19-year old motorcyclist. He received a five-month prison sentence in October 1995 for “manslaughter and hit and run”.

An engineer by profession, Ougier is an executive at French multinational company ALTEN.

== See also ==
- List of France national rugby union players
