= Cédric Desbrosse =

French rugby union player (born 1971)

- Born: 9 November 1971 (age 55) Givors
- Height: 1.90 m (6 ft 3 in)
- Weight: 95 kg (209 lb)

Rugby union career
- Position: Centre
Senior career
| Years | Team | Apps | (Points) |
| 1996-1998 | SO Givors | | |
| 1998-2004 | Toulouse | | |
| 2004-2005 | AS Béziers | | |
| 2005-2006 | RC Narbonne | | |
| 2006-2007 | Lyon OU | | |
| 2007-2008 | US Carcassonne | | |
International career
| Years | Team | Apps | (Points) |
| 1999-2000 | France | 2 | (0) |

Cédric Desbrosse (born 9 November 1971) is a retired French rugby player.

His usual positions was centre. He played for Stade Toulousain where he won top 14 and the Heineken Cup. He was selected for the 1999 Rugby World Cup and he made his first international test debut on 8 October 1999 against Namibia. Whilst at Toulouse he helped them win the Heineken Cup as a replacement in 2003.

== Honour ==
- Stade Toulousain
  - Heineken Cup (2003)
  - Top 14 (2008 and 2001)
