= 1998–99 Heineken Cup =

International rugby union competition

Tournament details
- Countries: France; Ireland; Italy; Scotland; Wales
- Tournament format(s): Round-robin and Knockout
- Date: 18 September 1998 to 30 January 1999

Tournament statistics
- Teams: 16
- Matches played: 55
- Attendance: 322,340 (5,861 per match)
- Top point scorer(s): Simon Mason (Ulster) (144 points)
- Top try scorer(s): Thomas Lombard (Stade Français); Michel Marfaing (Toulouse); Émile Ntamack (Toulouse) (7 tries)

Final
- Venue: Lansdowne Road, Dublin
- Attendance: 49,000
- Champions: (Ireland) Ulster (1st title)
- Runners-up: (France) Colomiers

The 1998–99 Heineken Cup was the fourth edition of the Heineken Cup. Competing teams from France, Ireland, Italy, Wales, and Scotland, were divided into four pools of four, in which teams played home and away matches against each other. Cardiff and Swansea did not compete due to a dispute with their union, the Welsh Rugby Union, whereas teams from England did not compete due to a dispute between European Rugby and the Rugby Football Union. The pool winners and runners-up qualified for the knock-out stages.

== Teams ==
France	Wales	Scotland	Ireland	Italy
Stade Français; Bègles-Bordeaux; Perpignan; Toulouse; Colomiers	Llanelli; Neath; Ebbw Vale; Pontypridd	Edinburgh; Glasgow	Leinster; Munster; Ulster	Petrarca; Treviso

== Pool stage ==
In the pool matches teams received 2 points for a win, 1 point for a draw and 0 points for a defeat.

=== Pool 1 ===
Team	P	W	D	L	Tries for	Tries against	Try diff	Points for	Points against	Points diff	Pts
(France) Stade Français Paris	6	5	0	1	27	10	17	219	117	102	10
(Wales) Llanelli	6	3	0	3	12	22	−10	113	180	−67	6
(Ireland) Leinster	6	2	0	4	17	12	5	141	124	17	4
(France) Bègles-Bordeaux	6	2	0	4	11	23	−12	127	179	−52	4

=== Pool 2 ===
Team	P	W	D	L	Tries for	Tries against	Try diff	Points for	Points against	Points diff	Pts
(France) Perpignan	6	5	0	1	35	13	22	238	108	130	10
(Ireland) Munster	6	4	1	1	17	13	4	144	108	36	9
(Wales) Neath	6	1	1	4	14	27	−13	118	194	−76	3
(Italy) Petrarca Padova	6	1	0	5	8	21	−13	79	169	−90	2

=== Pool 3 ===
Team	P	W	D	L	Tries for	Tries against	Try diff	Points for	Points against	Points diff	Pts
(Ireland) Ulster	6	4	1	1	23	20	3	197	168	29	9
(France) Toulouse	6	4	0	2	31	11	20	234	103	131	8
(Scotland) Edinburgh Reivers	6	2	1	3	21	14	7	179	146	33	5
(Wales) Ebbw Vale	6	1	0	5	11	41	−30	114	307	−193	2

=== Pool 4 ===
Team	P	W	D	L	Tries for	Tries against	Try diff	Points for	Points against	Points diff	Pts
(France) Colomiers	6	4	0	2	22	10	12	176	121	55	8
(Wales) Pontypridd	6	3	0	3	13	16	−3	160	141	19	6
(Italy) Benetton Treviso	6	3	0	3	13	13	0	142	150	−8	6
(Scotland) Glasgow Caledonians	6	2	0	4	10	19	−9	121	187	−66	4

== Seeding ==
Seed	Pool winners	Pts	TF	+/−
1	(France) Perpignan	10	35	+130
2	(France) Stade Français Paris	10	27	+102
3	(Ireland) Ulster	9	23	+29
4	(France) Colomiers	8	22	+55
Seed	Pool runners-up	Pts	TF	+/−
5	(Ireland) Munster	9	17	+36
6	(France) Toulouse	8	31	+131
7	(Wales) Pontypridd	6	13	+19
8	(Wales) Llanelli	6	12	−67

== Knockout stage ==
Quarter-finals
3	(Ireland) Ulster	15
6	(France) Toulouse	13
2	(France) Stade Français Paris	71
7	(Wales) Pontypridd	14
4	(France) Colomiers	23
5	(Ireland) Munster	9
1	(France) Perpignan	34
8	(Wales) Llanelli	17

Semi-finals
3	(Ireland) Ulster	33
2	(France) Stade Français Paris	27
4	(France) Colomiers	10
1	(France) Perpignan	6

Final
3	(Ireland) Ulster	21
4	(France) Colomiers	6

=== Quarter-finals ===
11 December 1998
19:15

Ulster (Ireland)	15–13	(France) Toulouse
Pen: Mason (3); Drop: Humphreys (2)	Report	Try: Pelous; Con: Ougier; Pen: Delaigue (2)

Ravenhill
Attendance: 11,500
Referee: B. Campbell

12 December 1998
15:00

Perpignan (France)	34–17	(Wales) Llanelli

Stade Aime Giral
Attendance: 10,000

12 December 1998
15:30

Stade Francais (France)	71–14	(Wales) Pontypridd

Stade Jean-Bouin
Attendance: 5,000

13 December 1998
15:00

Colomiers (France)	23–9	(Ireland) Munster
	Report

Stade Selery
Attendance: 8,000
Referee: N Whitehouse

=== Semi-finals ===
9 January 1999
13:00

Ulster (Ireland)	33–27	(France) Stade Francais
Try: McKinty, Humphreys; Con: Mason; Pen: Mason (5); Drop: Mason, Humphreys	Report; Highlights	Try: Juillet (2), Lièvremont; Con: Dominguez (3); Pen: Dominguez (2)

Ravenhill
Attendance: 20,000
Referee: J. Fleming

9 January 1999
14:45

Colomiers (France)	10–6	(France) Perpignan

Stadium Municipal, Toulouse
Attendance: 30,000

=== Final ===
30 January 1999
14:45

Ulster (Ireland)	21–6	(France) Colomiers
Pen: Mason (6); Drop: Humphreys	Report	Pen: Labit; Mickael Carre

Lansdowne Road, Dublin
Attendance: 49,000
Referee: Clayton Thomas (Wales)
