= Michel Marfaing =

France international rugby union player (born 1970)

- Born: 6 March 1970 (age 56) Pamiers, France
- Height: 6 ft 0 in (183 cm)
- Weight: 191 lb (87 kg)

Rugby union career
- Position: Centre / Wing
International career
Years	Team	Apps	(Points)
1992	France	2	(0)

Michel Marfaing (born 6 March 1970) is a French former rugby union international.

Born in Pamiers, Marfaing began his long association with Stade Toulousain in 1988. He was a pacy three-quarter, characterised by his long strides, initially used as a centre at Stade Toulousain.

In 1992, Marfaing gained two caps for France as an outside centre, in home Tests against Romania and Argentina.

Marfaing had a stint at RC Narbonne from 1993 to 1996, before returning to Stade Toulousain, where in his second stint at the club was a member of three championship-winning teams, playing on the wing. His 287 Heineken Cup points for Stade Toulousain, which included 24 tries, was previously a record.

A former Stade Toulousain youth coach, Marfaing is now sports director at the club's training centre.

== See also ==
- List of France national rugby union players
