= David Humphreys (rugby union) =

Ireland international rugby union player

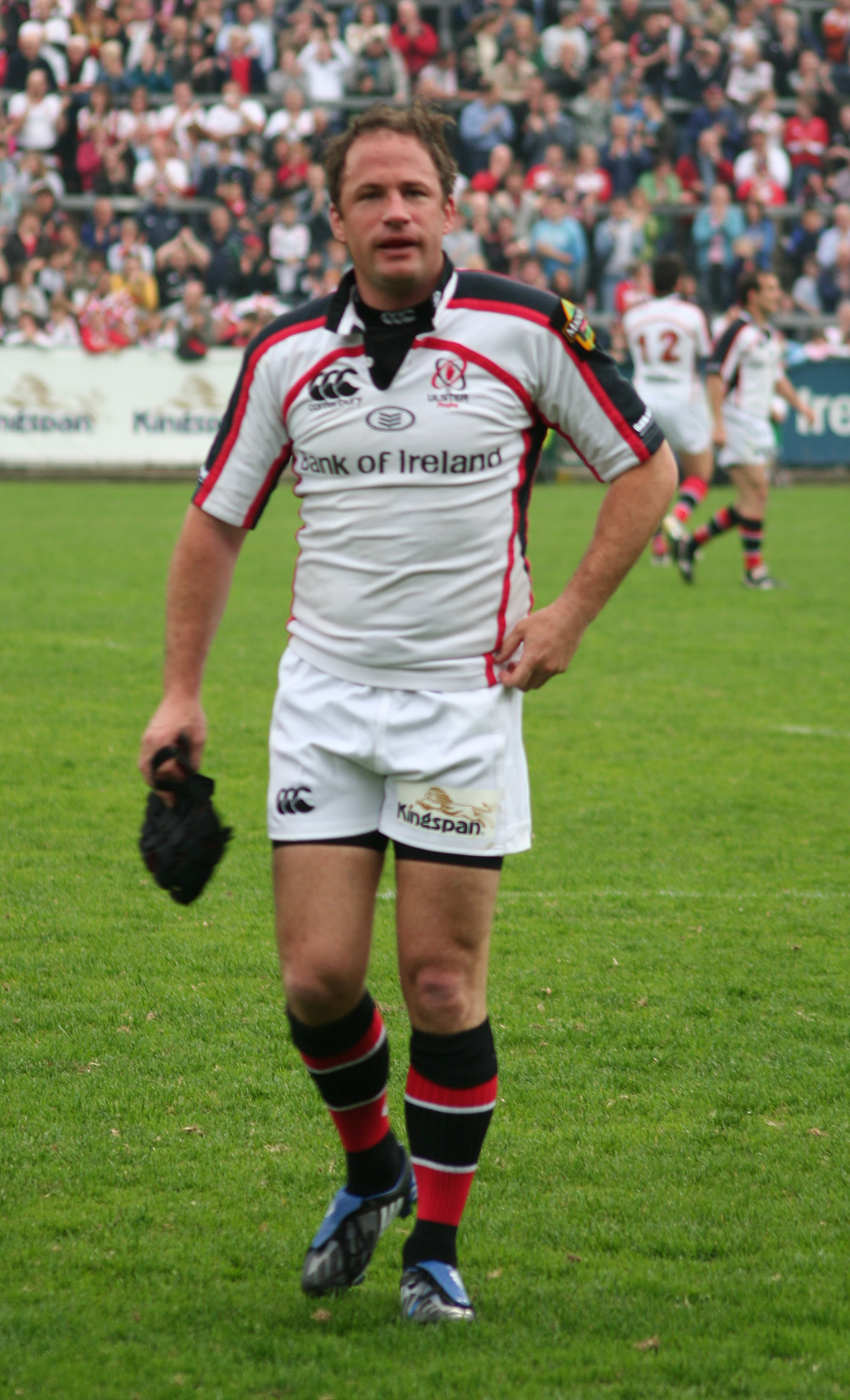
- Born: David Humphreys; 10 September 1971 (age 55) Belfast, Northern Ireland
- Height: 1.78 m (5 ft 10 in)
- Weight: 83 kg (13.1 st; 183 lb)
- School: Ballymena Academy
- University: Queen's University Belfast; University of Oxford
- Notable relative: Ian Humphreys (brother)

Rugby union career
- Position: Fly-half
Amateur team(s)
Years	Team	Apps	(Points)
1990-1994	Queen's University RFC		
1994	Ballymena R.F.C.		
1994-95	Oxford University RFC		
1998-	Dungannon RFC		
Senior career
Years	Team	Apps	(Points)
1996–1998	London Irish	56	(277)
1992–97, 1998-2008	Ulster	163	(1585)
International career
Years	Team	Apps	(Points)
1996–2006	Ireland	72	(560)
Coaching career
- Years: Team
- 2008–2014: Ulster (Director of Rugby)
- 2014–2020: Gloucester Rugby (Director of Rugby)
- 2020: Georgia (High Performance Consultant)
- 2023: Ireland (Performance Director)

David Humphreys' scores a Heineken Cup record 37 points against Wasps in 2001

David Humphreys MBE (born 10 September 1971) is an Irish former rugby union player. He played 72 times for Ireland, scoring 560 points, including 6 tries, and at the time of his international retirement was Ireland's most capped out-half. He played his club rugby for London Irish and Ulster, winning the 1998-99 Heineken Cup, the 2004 Celtic Cup and the 2005–06 Celtic League with the latter. Since retiring as a player he has served as director of rugby for Ulster and Gloucester, as a performance consultant with the Georgian Rugby Union, and Director of Performance Operations with the England and Wales Cricket Board. Since June 2024 he has been Performance Director of the IRFU.

== Playing career ==
=== Early career ===
Humphreys started playing rugby while at Ballymena Academy, and represented Ireland Schools, captaining them to the Triple Crown in 1990. In the amateur era, he played for Queen's University RFC, with whom he won the Dudley Cup in 1994, Ballymena R.F.C., and Oxford University RFC, for whom he scored all 19 points in a losing effort in the 1995 Varsity Match. He also played provincial representative rugby for Ulster, making his senior debut in an away victory over Cumbria in 1992, and his Interprovincial debut against Munster the same year, and was selected for Ireland under-21, 'A' and development teams.

=== London Irish ===
After rugby union was declared open to professionalism in 1995, Humphreys was approached by Clive Woodward to sign for London Irish, then in Division Two of the Courage League. He made his debut for the club in January 1996, with Ireland coach Murray Kidd in attendance. They were promoted to Division One the following season, but after poor results in the top flight, Woodward was replaced as coach by Willie Anderson, who helped them avoid relegation, with Humphreys described as the "catalyst" for their "Houdini-like escape", scoring 18 points in the relegation play-off victory over Coventry. The following season, London Irish struggled again. Anderson was sacked in mid-season, replaced by Dick Best, and they again avoided relegation in a playoff against Rotherham.

=== Ulster ===
Humphreys continued to be selected for Ulster while at London Irish, starring in a win against New South Wales in February 1996, in which he scored 17 points - a try, three conversions, a drop goal and a penalty. He appeared for Ulster in the 1996–97 Heineken Cup, defying London Irish to do so, but was unavailable for the province the following season, after the English clubs declared that they no longer considered the Irish provinces to be representative sides. Warren Gatland, the new Ireland coach, led a drive by the IRFU to bring Irish players who had signed contracts with English clubs back to Ireland for the 1998–99 season, Humphreys being one of them. He joined Dungannon RFC, making him available for selection for Ulster, and agreed a contract with the IRFU. After Mark McCall sustained a serious neck injury, Humphreys was named Ulster's captain, and led them to win the 1998–99 Heineken Cup.

He won the All-Ireland League with Dungannon in 2001, and was man of the match in the final, scoring five penalties, four conversions and a drop goal, 26 points in all, against Cork Constitution. For Ulster, he was the leading scorer in the inaugural Celtic League in 2001–02 with 122 points, and the league's leading marksman with 39 successful goal kicks. He set a Heineken Cup record for the most points scored in a single game, with 37 in Ulster's 42–16 win against Wasps in 2002. With Ulster, he won the Celtic Cup in 2004, scoring 17 points in the final, and the Celtic League in 2006, scoring a last-minute 40-metre drop goal in the final game to clinch the title.

He won Ulster's player of the year and supporters' club player of the year awards in 2002, and the team's personality of the year award in 1999, 2000 and 2008. He won a supporters' poll for Ulster's all-time favourite player in 2008. He retired in 2008 as Ulster's most capped player with 163 appearances, having scored 27 tries, 179 conversions, 326 penalties and 38 drop goals, 1,585 points in all. At the time of his retirement he was the Celtic League's top scorer with 786 points, and the Heineken Cup's fourth top scorer with 583 points.

=== International career ===
Humphreys made his senior debut for Ireland against France in the 1996 Five Nations Championship. For several years he vied with Munster's Ronan O'Gara for the out-half position on the Ireland team, with O'Gara ultimately making the position his own. Nevertheless, Humphreys won 72 caps for Ireland, captaining the side five times. He retired from the international game in 2006 as Ireland's most-capped out-half and second highest points scorer, having scored six tries, 110 penalties, 88 conversions and eight drop-goals, 560 points in all. He also represented Ireland at the 1997 Rugby World Cup Sevens, and played six times for the Barbarians between 2003 and 2005, once as captain, and scored 33 points.

== Post-playing career ==
On retiring as a player, he was appointed to the new role of Operations Director of Ulster, with responsibility for contract negotiations. The following season, he became the team's Director of Rugby, overseeing the senior team, the 'A' team, the under-20s and the academy. His role included player recruitment, and he is credited with signing South African stars Ruan Pienaar, Johann Muller and John Afoa, and persuading Tommy Bowe and Roger Wilson to return to Ulster. In 2014 he became Director of Rugby at Gloucester. He left this role at the end of the 2019–20 season. He had a high performance consulting role with Georgia at the 2020 Autumn Nations Cup. In 2021 he launched a sports recruitment company, SportsWork. He was also in involved in cricket in Ireland and England, serving on the high performance committee of Cricket Ireland before becoming director of cricket operations for the England and Wales Cricket Board in February 2023. In November 2023 it was announced that he would join the Irish Rugby Football Union as Performance Director Designate in March 2024, before succeeding David Nucifora as Performance Director in June.

== Personal life ==
His sister Karen is a former international hockey player, and his younger brother Ian was a professional rugby player, who played out-half for Leicester Tigers, London Irish and Ulster. His son James is an Ireland under-20 international, and a development player for Ulster.

He studied law at Queen's University Belfast, He trained as a solicitor with Belfast law firm Tughans, under former Ulster and Ireland rugby international Mike Gibson.

He received an Honorary Doctorate from the University of Ulster in December 2003 for Services to Sport and an MBE in the Queens New Year's Honours List in January 2004. He was inducted into the IRUPA Hall of Fame in 2008.
