= Colomiers Rugby =

French rugby union club

(France) Colomiers
- Full name: Union Sportive Colomiers Rugby
- Founded: 1915; 111 years ago
- Location: Colomiers, France
- Ground: Stade Michel Bendichou (Capacity: 11,430)
- President: Alain Carre
- Coach: Olivier Baragnon
- League: Pro D2
- 2024–25: 3rd
1st kit	2nd kit

Official website
- www.colomiers-rugby.com

Union Sportive Colomiers Rugby or Rugby Colomiers is a French rugby union club currently competing in Pro D2, the second level of the French rugby pyramid. They had been relegated from Pro D2 after finishing last in the 2006–07 season, but earned promotion from Fédérale 1 at the first opportunity in 2007-08, and survived a relegation scare in 2008–09, finishing 14th, in the last safe position. The club was relegated from Pro D2 in the 2010–11 season. The club, based in Colomiers in the Haute-Garonne département of Occitania, was founded in 1915 and plays at the Stade Michel Bendichou (capacity 11,000). The players wear blue and white. Colomiers have been runners-up in the French championship and Heineken Cup, as well as winners of the European Challenge Cup.

US Colomiers were established in 1915. Colomiers had various European success in the late 1990s. In 1998 they won the European Challenge Cup, the competition below the Heineken Cup, defeating fellow French club SU Agen in the final. The following season they competed in the Heineken Cup. They made it all the way to the final, which took place at Lansdowne Road, Dublin. The capacity crowd saw Irish side Ulster win 21 points to 6.

Colomiers also competed in the 1999–00 and 2000–01 Heineken Cups, but did not make the finals stages of the tournament. The club made its first domestic championship final when they met Stade Français in 2000. The Paris club won the game 28 points to 23 at Stade de France. In 2005 they were crowned Fédérale 1 champions and were promoted back up to Pro D2, but went back down to Fédérale 1 after two seasons in the second flight. They again claimed the Fédérale 1 title in 2008 to return to Pro D2.

== Honours ==
- European Rugby Champions Cup (formerly known as Heineken Cup)
  - Runners-up (1): 1999
- European Rugby Challenge Cup
  - Champions (1): 1998
- French championship Top 14
  - Runners-up (1): 2000
- Fédérale 1
  - Champions: 2005, 2008, 2009

== Finals results ==
=== French championship ===
Date	Winners	Score	Runners-up	Venue	Spectators
15 July 2000	Stade Français	28-23	US Colomiers	Stade de France, Saint-Denis	78,000

=== Heineken Cup / European Rugby Champions Cup ===
Date	Winners	Score	Runners-up	Venue	Spectators
30 January 1999	(Ireland) Ulster	21-6	(France) US Colomiers	Lansdowne Road, Dublin	49,000

=== European Rugby Challenge Cup ===
Date	Winners	Score	Runners-up	Venue	Spectators
1 February 1998	(France) US Colomiers	43-5	(France) SU Agen	Stade des Sept Deniers, Toulouse	12,500

== Current standings ==
2025–26 Pro D2 Table
Pos	Team	Pld	W	D	L	PF	PA	PD	TB	LB	Pts	Qualification
1	Vannes	30	24	1	5	1092	543	+549	15	3	116	Semi-final promotion playoff place
2	Colomiers	30	21	0	9	847	522	+325	8	3	95	Semi-final promotion playoff place
3	Provence	30	19	0	11	905	726	+179	9	7	92	Quarter-final promotion playoff place
4	Oyonnax	30	17	0	13	953	659	+294	9	9	86	Quarter-final promotion playoff place
5	Valence Romans	30	19	0	11	803	760	+43	4	4	84	Quarter-final promotion playoff place
6	Brive	30	17	1	12	906	642	+264	11	2	83	Quarter-final promotion playoff place
7	Agen	30	15	0	15	796	750	+46	9	3	72	
8	Grenoble	30	14	0	16	739	829	−90	2	4	62	
9	Soyaux Angoulême	30	13	0	17	576	770	−194	2	5	59	
10	Biarritz	30	12	1	17	762	879	−117	8	1	54	
11	Dax	30	14	0	16	706	742	−36	6	7	55	
12	Béziers	30	12	0	18	657	804	−147	4	4	56	
13	Nevers	30	11	1	18	760	1024	−264	4	3	53	
14	Aurillac	30	11	0	19	718	908	−190	2	7	53	
15	Mont-de-Marsan	30	11	1	18	701	950	−249	3	2	51	Relegation play-off
16	Carcassonne	30	7	1	22	572	985	−413	0	5	35	Relegation to Nationale

Updated to match(es) played on 17 May 2026. Source:

== Current squad ==
The squad for the 2025–26 season is:

Colomiers 2025–26 Pro D2 squad
**Props**: (France) Robin Bellemand; (Morocco) **Eliès El Ansari**; (Tonga) **Phil Kite**; (France) Pierre-Emmanuel Pacheco; (France) Michael Simutoga; (France) Guillaume Tartas; (France) Atonio Ulutuipaleiei; **Hookers**: (Italy) **Pablo Dimcheff**; (France) Théo Lachaud; (France) Thomas Larrieu; **Locks**: (France) Thomas Adélaide; (England) Myles Edwards; (France) Maxime Granouillet; (Argentina) Federico Lavanini; (France) Jean Thomas	**Back row**: (France) Grégoire Bazin; (France) Jeremy Bechu; (France) Alexis Caumel; (Portugal) **Nicolas Martins**; (France) Elliott Maurel; (France) Paolo Parpagiola; (France) Luka Plataret; (Australia) **Caleb Timu**; **Scrum-halves**: (France) Jules Danglot; (France) Arthur Diaz; (France) Ugo Seguela; **Fly-halves**: (France) Valentin Delpy; (France) Théo Giral	**Centres**: (France) Martin Dulon; (New Zealand) Ray Nu'u; (Argentina) Matías Osadczuk; (France) Enzo Salles; (France) Baptiste Serrano; **Wings**: (Spain) **Martín Alonso**; (Portugal) **Rodrigo Marta**; (Portugal) **Vincent Pinto**; (France) Valentin Saurs; (Tonga) **Anzelo Tuitavuki**; **Fullbacks**: (France) Max Auriac; (France) Alexandre Borie; (Spain) **Alberto Carmona**
**(c)** denotes the team captain. (vc) denotes vice-captain. **Bold** denotes internationally capped players.^{ST} denotes a short-term signing. Source:

Colomiers 2025–26 Espoirs squad
**Props**: (France) Valentin Barret; **Hookers**: (France) Clovis Chizat; (France) Arthur Cros; **Locks**: (France) Theo Pedemons	**Back row** **Scrum-halves**: (France) Natan Culinat; (France) Guillaume Laffont; **Fly-halves**	**Centres** **Wings**: (France) Farell Delmourel; (France) Rayan Houari; **Fullbacks**
**(c)** denotes the team captain. (vc) denotes vice-captain. **Bold** denotes internationally capped players.^{ST} denotes a short-term signing. Source:

== Notable former players ==
- Jean-Luc Sadourny / 1984-2003
- Fabien Galthié / 1985-2001
- Yannick Bru / 1997-1998
- David Skrela / 1997-2003 and 2013-2016
- Patrick Tabacco / 1997-2000
- Marc Dal Maso / 1998-2000
- Yannick Jauzion / 1999-2002
- Francis Ntamack / 1999-2004 and 2006-2007
- Julien Arias / 2001-2004
- Hugues Miorin / 2002-2003
- Yannick Forestier / 2003-2004
- Thierry Dusautoir / 2003-2004
- Jean-Philippe Grandclaude / 2003-2004
- Patricio Albacete / 2003-2004
- Benjamin Thiéry / 2003-2004
- Jonathan Wisniewski / 2007
- François Tardieu / 2017-2018

== Coaches ==
- Jean-Luc Sadourny
- Bernard de Giusti

== See also ==
- List of rugby union clubs in France
- Rugby union in France
