= Simon Mason (rugby union) =

Irish rugby union player

- Full name: Simon John Mason
- Born: 22 October 1973 (age 53) Wirral, England
- Height: 6 ft 1 in (185 cm)
- Weight: 200 lb (91 kg)

Rugby union career
- Position: Fullback
International career
Years	Team	Apps	(Points)
1996	Ireland	3	(42)

Simon John Mason (born 22 October 1973) is an English-born former Ireland rugby union international, scoring 42 points in three senior international test matches. He played professional rugby in England, Ireland, France and Italy, from 1995 until 2006. He scored over 3,000 points and was a prolific goal kicker.

Mason was born and raised on the Wirral but had four Irish grandparents, thus qualifying for Ireland. He attended St Anselm's College in Birkenhead, where he was a teammate of future England player Austin Healey.

A fullback, Mason was capped three times for Ireland in 1996, playing in the final two Five Nations matches. He had a superb debut versus Wales at Lansdowne Road in a record win. He then kicked 12 of Ireland's 15 points in the final game of the Championship versus England at Twickenham. He played in the November test loss to Samoa. He was one of eight Irish players to be dropped following the Samoa match.

Mason played Premiership Rugby for Richmond in 1997–98, then had two seasons at Ulster. He won the 1999 Heineken Cup title with Ulster and accumulated 144 points during the campaign, going on to be named Ulster's "Player of the Year".

Following his time in Northern Ireland, Mason signed a three-year contract with Stade Français in the Top 14, and was a member of the squad that got to the final of the Heineken Cup in 2001. He then left after one season and joined Benetton Treviso . He spent the next three seasons in Italy playing for Treviso and he won two Italian Championships and scored over 800 points.

== See also ==
- List of Ireland national rugby union players
