= Gary Longwell =

Rugby union player from Northern Ireland

- Born: Gary Longwell; 30 July 1971 (age 55) Belfast, Northern Ireland
- Height: 6 ft 7 in (2.01 m)
- Weight: 117 kg (18 st 6 lb; 258 lb)

Rugby union career
- Position: Lock
Provincial / State sides
Years	Team	Apps	(Points)
1991–2005	Ulster	152	
- Correct as of 7 August 2018
International career
Years	Team	Apps	(Points)
2000–04	Ireland	26	(5)
- Correct as of 7 August 2018

Gary Longwell (born 30 July 1971 in Belfast) is an Irish international rugby player. His usual position is as a lock, or second row. He spent his entire career playing for Irish provincial side Ulster, making his debut aged 19 in 1991. He was part of the Heineken Cup-winning Ulster team of 1999 in the 21–6 victory over Colomiers at Lansdowne Road in Dublin. In 2015, he was inducted into the Newtownabbey Hall of Fame

== Provincial career ==
He made 152 caps for his provincial side Ulster, making his debut aged just 19 against English side Cornwall in 1991. He also played an integral role in the Heineken Cup final victory winning Ulster team of 1999 in the 21–6 victory over Colomiers at Lansdowne Road in Dublin.

== International career ==
Longwell made his debut for the Irish national team on 11 November 2000 in a Test against Japan in Dublin and went on to win 26 caps. He was a part of Ireland's squad at the 2003 Rugby World Cup in Australia. He was also the only Ireland try scorer in the 40-8 demolition by New Zealand in Auckland, 2002.

== Post-playing career ==
In 2005, Longwell was appointed head of the Ulster Rugby academy.
