= 1995–96 Ulster Rugby season =

First provincial professional playing season

- Ground: Ravenhill Stadium (Capacity: 12,500)
- Coach: Brian Bloomfield
- Captain: Bill Harbinson
- Top scorer: Mark McCall (111)
- Most tries: James Topping (7)
- League(s): Heineken Cup (3rd in pool); IRFU Interprovincial Championship (2nd of 5)
Team kit

The 1995–96 season was Ulster Rugby's first season under professionalism. Brian Bloomfield was in his second season as coach. Stephen Blake-Knox was the new chairman of selectors, replacing Dick Milliken; the other selectors were Bloomfield, Dermott Dalton, Philip Rainey and Nigel Carr. 35-year-old Malone RFC centre Bill Harbinson, who first played for Ulster in 1986, was captain, in his final season before retirement from the game. They played six representative matches, defeating Griqualand West, New Zealand Federation U23 and New South Wales, and losing to a Côte Basque Select XV, the Combined Services and Edinburgh District. They finished second behind Leinster in the IRFU Interprovincial Championship. They were one of three Irish provinces entered into the inaugural Heineken Cup, losing both their pool matches against Cardiff and Bègles-Bordeaux.

Lock Jeremy Davidson, hooker Allen Clarke, out-half David Humphreys and wing James Topping made their debuts for Ireland this season.

An Ulster women's team was founded this season. Clara Heaton made her debut for Ireland

== Background ==
On 26 August, rugby union was declared open to professionalism. At this stage the Irish provinces were still representative teams, not professional clubs. Many involved in the game were concerned that domestic clubs could not afford to pay players, who could be lost to professional teams in England. In September, the IRFU confirmed that, for this season, only senior international players would be paid, with a one-year moratorium on payment for club and provincial players. Up to 35 Ireland players would be offered £26,000 contracts for the 1996 Five Nations Championship. That squad included Ulster players Jonathan Bell, Allen Clarke, Jeremy Davidson, Maurice Field, David Humphreys, Paddy Johns, Denis McBride and Mark McCall. As the situation developed, match fees became available for Heineken Cup and Interprovincial matches, with players who appeared in all six matches in line to receive almost £3,000.

The inaugural Heineken Cup was launched in the summer of 1995 on the initiative of the Five Nations Committee to provide a new level of cross border competition. Twelve sides representing Ireland, Wales, Italy, Romania and France competed in four pools of three with the group winners going directly into the semi-finals. English and Scottish teams did not take part in the inaugural competition. The IRFU confirmed that Ireland would enter provincial teams, as their clubs were unlikely to be strong enough for the competition. They were initially offered two places, but Tom Kiernan, Ireland's representative on the organising committee, was able to secure a third. The three places would go to the top three teams in the 1994 IRFU Interprovincial Championship, Munster, Ulster and Leinster.

== Events ==
Jonathan Bell, who had impressed with Ireland in the World Cup, was offered contracts to play rugby league by both Sheffield and Halifax, but turned them down to remain available for Ireland, with a long-term goal of selection for the British and Irish Lions tour of South Africa in two years' time. The former Ballymena player, now studying at Loughborough University, had signed for Northampton but remained available for Ulster. Other Ulster players who featured for Ireland at the World Cup were Paddy Johns, Denis McBride, Maurice Field and Davy Tweed.

Ulster's campaign started in August with a tour to Capbreton, France, to play a Côte Basque Select XV. The French side picked up Ulster's travel and accommodation expenses, in recompense for a scheduled game which was called off at the last minute the previous season when Côte Basque were unable to field a team. Stephen Blake-Knox, the new chairman of selectors, had a limited panel of players to select from, with twelve regular players declaring themselves unavailable. With Simon Booth on honeymoon, Richard Mackey was selected at tighthead prop, with Gary Leslie at loosehead in place of the injured Gary Bell, and Allen Clarke kept his place at hooker. Jeremy Davidson and Gary Longwell made up the second row. New Zealand-born flanker Bruce Cornelius replaced David Erskine, who missed the tour for a job interview, in the back row alongside Kevin McKee and Roger Wilson. Neil Doak, who had made his Ulster debut in February, was selected at scrum-half, with David Humphreys at out-half. Bill Harbinson captained the side, lining up in the centres with Jonathan Bell. Two new faces on the wings were Jan Cunningham, replacing the injured Tyrone Howe, and James Topping, with Stan McDowell playing fullback.

On 1 October Ulster played touring South African provincial side Griqualand West. Davy Tweed came in to the second row alongside Jeremy Davidson. Paddy Johns was named at number 8, with Stephen McKinty and Denis McBride on the flanks. With David Humphreys unavailable after moving to Oxford University, Mark McCall was selected at out-half. Jonathan Bell was unavailable with a hamstring injury, so Ireland international Maurice Field joined Bill Harbinson in the centres, and former international fullback Colin Wilkinson was drafted into the team, despite having retired from representative rugby two years previously, on the basis of his club form for Malone. James Topping scored three tries and Wilkinson scored two drop goals in a convincing 54–10 win.

They next faced a touring New Zealand Federation under-23 side on 9 November. Although originally scheduled as an Ulster Development match, Ulster decided to field their senior team after their development side was badly beaten by Natal Emerging. Stephen Ritchie came in for his provincial debut at hooker. Gary Longwell returned alongside Jeremy Davidson in the second row, and Bruce Cornelius and Kevin McKee came back into the back row with Stephen McKinty. Michael Rainey started alongside Maurice Field in the centres, with Graham McCluskey and debutant Andy Park on the wings. Park scored the opening try in a scrappy win.

For the match against the Combined Services on 14 November, Simon Booth was selected ahead of Richard Mackey at loosehead prop. Tweed and Longwell made up the second row with Conelius, McKee and McKinty making up the back row. Andrew Matchett came in for Neil Doak at scrum-half, Darryl Callaghan made his provincial debut at out-half, with Mark McCall moved to centre alongside Harbinson, and fellow debutant Robin Morrow came in for Wilkinson at fullback. The Services team included former Ulster and Ireland lock Brian McCall, now a major in Britain's UN peacekeeping forces in Bosnia. Ulster were well beaten, with only a late try by Stephen Ritchie making the scoreline look respectable.

Ulster opened their Interprovincial campaign at home against defending champions Munster on 25 November. Richard Mackey and Allen Clarke were restored to the front row. Jeremy Davidson returned to partner Davy Tweed in the second row after making his Ireland debut against Fiji. McBride and Stuart Duncan were on the flanks, with Paddy Johns at number 8. Mark McCall moved back to out-half, with Maurice Field returning to partner Harbinson in the centres, Jan Cunningham and James Topping back on the wings, and Jonathan Bell returning to the team at fullback. Ulster won 14–10 in an uninspiring encounter, with Richard Mackey scoring the winning try 12 minutes from time.

Sale loose forward David Erskine had been declared ineligible for Ulster by the IRFU, as he was not born in Ireland and was no longer resident there. He won his appeal against the decision, and was selected at number 8 for Ulster's opening Heineken Cup match away to Cardiff on 28 November, in place of Paddy Johns. Gary Longwell replaced Davy Tweed, who was unable to get time off from his job with Northern Ireland Railways, in the second row. Ulster were beaten 46–6. Cardiff, in common with other Welsh sides, had adopted the relatively new tactic of lifting in the lineout; Irish teams had not, and Ulster players were unable to deal with it.

The following weekend, they went to Galway to play Connacht in the Interprovincial Championship on 2 December. Paddy Johns returned at number 8, and Davy Tweed was back in the second row alongside Jeremy Davidson. They won 27–9, based on the hard work of Johns, Duncan and McBride in the back row, and Tweed's dominance in the lineout.

On 9 December Ulster made nine changes to the side to play Edinburgh District at home. Stephen Ritchie came in for Allen Clarke at hooker, David Scott for Gary Leslie at tighthead prop, and Gary Longwell for Davy Tweed in the second row. The whole back row was rested, with Kevin McKee, Stephen McKinty and David Erskine replacing Denis McBride, Stuart Duncan and Paddy Johns. Andrew Matchett came in for Neil Doak at scrum-half, Andy Park for Jan Cunningham on the wing, and Colin Wilkinson returned at fullback in place of Jonathan Bell. They lost 23–24, with all of Ulster's points being scored by Mark McCall.

Clarke, Leslie, Davidson, Tweed, McBride, Duncan, Johns, Topping and Bell returned, and Matchett and Park retained their places, for Ulster's second and final match in the Heineken Cup, at home to Bègles-Bordeaux on 13 December. The game was close until the final five minutes, when, at 16–22, McBride was stopped short of the try line. Soon after, Bègles-Bordeaux's Sebastien Loubsens intercepted an Ulster pass, leading to a try by Julien Berthe that put the French side too far ahead to catch. The match finished 16–29. Ulster finished bottom of the pool, failing to make the semi-finals. Toulouse went on to become the first European cup winners, beating Cardiff in extra time in front of a crowd of 21,800 at Cardiff Arms Park.

Jan Cunningham returned for the Interpro against the Irish Exiles on 16 December, which Ulster dominated, winning 29–3, and setting up a championship decider against Leinster on 23 December. Leinster won their first Interprovincial title for twelve years with a 31–3 win at Donnybrook. The starting XV was unchanged. Paul Wallace scored the opening try after fifteen seconds, and Leinster raced to a 22–0 lead in the first twenty minutes. Ulster had plenty of possession, with Paddy Johns coming close to scoring on two occasions before half-time, but Leinster defended strongly, and only conceded one Mark McCall penalty.

Allen Clarke, Davy Tweed, Jeremy Davidson, Denis McBride, Paddy Johns, Jonathan Bell and Maurice Field were selected for Ireland's tour to the USA in January 1996.

David Humphreys, who had now joined London Irish, was recalled for Ulster's home match against New South Wales on 6 February. Bill Harbinson had retired from representative rugby, so Mark McCall moved to centre alongside Maurice Field, Colin Wilkinson returned at fullback, and Davy Tweed came in to the second row in place of the injured Jeremy Davidson. Humphreys led Ulster to a 40–33 victory in front of the Ireland management team.

David Humphreys and Allen Clarke made their Ireland debuts in the 1996 Five Nations Championship. Paddy Johns, Jeremy Davidson, Denis McBride, Jonathan Bell, Maurice Field and Mark McCall also appeared for Ireland in the tournament.

== Players selected ==
Ulster Rugby squad
**Props**: (Ireland) Simon Booth, Ballymena; (Ireland) Gary Leslie, Dungannon; (Ireland) Richard Mackey, Malone; (Ireland) David Scott, NIFC; **Hookers**: (Ireland) Allen Clarke, Northampton; (Ireland) Stephen Ritchie, Ballymena; (Ireland) Richard Weir, QUB; **Locks**: (Ireland) Simon Crawford, NIFC; (Ireland) Jeremy Davidson, Dungannon; (Ireland) **Gary Longwell**, Ballymena; (Ireland) Murtagh Rea, Malone; (Ireland) **Davy Tweed**, Ballymena	**Back row**: (New Zealand) Bruce Cornelius, Instonians; (Ireland) Stuart Duncan, Malone; (Ireland) David Erskine, Sale; (Ireland) **Paddy Johns**, Dungannon; (Ireland) **Denis McBride**, Malone; (Ireland) Kevin McKee, Instonians; (Ireland) Stephen McKinty, Bangor; (Ireland) Roger Wilson, Instonians; **Scrum-halves**: (Ireland) Stephen Bell, Malone; (Ireland) Neil Doak, NIFC; (Ireland) Andrew Matchett, Ballymena; **Fly-halves**: (Ireland) Darryl Callaghan, Dungannon; (Ireland) David Humphreys, Ballymena; (Ireland) **Mark McCall**, Bangor	**Centres**: (Ireland) **Maurice Field**, Malone; (Ireland) Bill Harbinson, Malone (c); (Ireland) Michael Rainey, Ballymena; **Wings**: (Ireland) Colin Christie, NIFC; (Ireland) Jan Cunningham, TCD; (Ireland) Crawford Dobbin, NIFC; (Ireland) Graeme McCluskey, Instonians; (Ireland) Andy Park, NIFC; (Ireland) Stephen Smyth, City of Derry; (Ireland) James Topping, Ballymena; **Fullbacks**: (Ireland) **Jonny Bell**, Northampton; (Ireland) Stan McDowell, Dungannon; (Ireland) Robin Morrow, QUB; (Ireland) **Colin Wilkinson**, Malone
(c) denotes the team captain, **Bold** denotes internationally capped players.^{*} denotes players qualified to play for Ireland on residency or dual nationality.

== Season record ==
Competition	Played	Won	Drawn	Lost	PF	PA	PD	TF	TA
1995-96 Heineken Cup	2	0	0	2	22	75	-53	2	9
IRFU Interprovincial Championship	4	3	0	1	73	53	20	6	4
Representative	6	3	0	3	188	132	56	21	17
Total	12	6	0	6	281	260	21	29	30

== Heineken Cup ==
=== Pool 2 ===
Team	P	W	D	L	Tries for	Tries against	Try diff	Points for	Points against	Points diff	Pts	Status
(Wales) Cardiff	2	1	1	0	7	1	6	60	20	40	3	Advanced to the semi-finals
(France) Bègles-Bordeaux	2	1	1	0	6	3	3	43	30	13	3	Eliminated
(Ireland) Ulster	2	0	0	2	2	11	−9	22	75	−53	0	Eliminated

28 November 1995	Cardiff (Wales)	46–6	(Ireland) Ulster	Cardiff Arms Park
19:15	Try: Hall; John; Davies; Moore (2); Con: Davies (5); Pen: Davies (2)	Report; Match centre	Pen: McCall (2)	Attendance: 3,600; Referee: Gerald Borreani
Ulster lineup: 1. Richard Mackey, 2. Allen Clarke, 3. Gary Leslie, 4. Jeremy Davidson, 5. Gary Longwell, 6. Stuart Duncan, 7. Denis McBride, 8. David Erskine, 9. Neil Doak, 10. Mark McCall, 11. Jan Cunningham, 12. Bill Harbinson (c), 13. Maurice Field, 14. James Topping, 15. Jonny Bell.; Replacement: Roger Wilson (for McBride, 77 mins).				Attendance: 3,600; Referee: Gerald Borreani

13 December 1995	Ulster (Ireland)	16–29	(France) Bègles-Bordeaux	Ravenhill, Belfast
19:00	Try: Matchett; McBride; Pen: McCall (2)	Report; Match centre	Try: Fauthoux; Bernat-Salles; Loubsens; Berthe; Con: Fauthoux; Berthe	Attendance: 2,500; Referee: Derek Bevan
Ulster lineup: 1. Richard Mackey, 2. Allen Clarke, 3. Gary Leslie, 4. Davy Tweed, 5. Gary Longwell, 6. Stuart Duncan, 7. Denis McBride, 8. Paddy Johns, 9. Andrew Matchett, 10. Mark McCall, 11. Andy Park, 12. Bill Harbinson (c), 13. Maurice Field, 14. James Topping, 15. Jonny Bell.				Attendance: 2,500; Referee: Derek Bevan

== IRFU Interprovincial Championship ==
Team	P	W	D	L	F	A	Pts	Status
Leinster	4	4	0	0	133	53	16	Champions; qualified for 1996–97 Heineken Cup
Ulster	4	3	0	1	73	53	12	Qualified for 1996–97 Heineken Cup
Munster	4	2	0	2	91	58	8	Qualified for 1996–97 Heineken Cup
Exiles	4	1	0	3	71	113	4	
Connacht	4	0	0	4	51	142	0	Qualified for 1996–97 European Challenge Cup

25 November 1995	Ulster	14–10	Munster	Ravenhill, Belfast
	Try: Mackey; Pen: McCall (3)	Report	Try: Walsh; Con: Smith; Pen: Smith	Referee: A. Lewis
Ulster lineup: 1. Richard Mackey, 2. Allen Clarke, 3. Gary Leslie, 4. Jeremy Davidson, 5. Davy Tweed, 6. Stuart Duncan, 7. Denis McBride, 8. Paddy Johns, 9. Neil Doak, 10. Mark McCall, 11. Jan Cunningham, 12. Bill Harbinson (c), 13. Maurice Field, 14. James Topping, 15. Jonny Bell.				Referee: A. Lewis

2 December 1995	Connacht	9–27	Ulster	The Sportsground, Galway
	Pen: Elwood (3)	Report	Try: Topping; Field; Con: McCall; Pen: McCall (5)	Referee: D. McHugh
Ulster lineup: 1. Richard Mackey, 2. Allen Clarke, 3. Gary Leslie, 4. Jeremy Davidson, 5. Davy Tweed, 6. Stuart Duncan, 7. Denis McBride, 8. Paddy Johns, 9. Neil Doak, 10. Mark McCall, 11. Jan Cunningham, 12. Bill Harbinson (c), 13. Maurice Field, 14. James Topping, 15. Jonny Bell.				Referee: D. McHugh

16 December 1995	Ulster	29–3	(Ireland) Irish Exiles	Ravenhill, Belfast
	Try: Cunningham; Tweed; Harbinson; Con: McCall; Pen: McCall (4)	Report	Pen: Corcoran	Referee: R. McDowell
Ulster lineup: 1. Richard Mackey, 2. Allen Clarke, 3. Gary Leslie, 4. Jeremy Davidson, 5. Davy Tweed, 6. Stuart Duncan, 7. Denis McBride, 8. Paddy Johns, 9. Andrew Matchett, 10. Mark McCall, 11. Jan Cunningham, 12. Bill Harbinson (c), 13. Maurice Field, 14. James Topping, 15. Jonny Bell.; Replacements: Simon Booth (for Mackey, 59).				Referee: R. McDowell

23 December 1995	Leinster	31–3	Ulster	Donnybrook, Dublin
	Try: Wallace; Jameson; Gavin; Con: McGowan (2); Pen: McGowan (4)	Report	Pen: McCall	Referee: C. White
Ulster lineup: 1. Richard Mackey, 2. Allen Clarke, 3. Gary Leslie, 4. Jeremy Davidson, 5. Davy Tweed, 6. Stuart Duncan, 7. Denis McBride, 8. Paddy Johns, 9. Andrew Matchett, 10. Mark McCall, 11. Jan Cunningham, 12. Bill Harbinson (c), 13. Maurice Field, 14. James Topping, 15. Jonny Bell.				Referee: C. White

== Home attendance ==
Domestic League					European Cup					Total	
League	Fixtures	Average Attendance	Highest	Lowest	League	Fixtures	Average Attendance	Highest	Lowest	Total Attendance	Average Attendance
–	–	–	–	–	1995–96 Heineken Cup	1	2,500	2,500	2,500	2,500	2,500

== Representative matches ==
26 August 1995	Côte Basque Select XV (France)	28–26	(Ireland) Ulster	Capbreton
	Try: (4); Con: (4)	Preview; Report	Try: Topping; Doak; Con: Humphreys (2); Pen: Humphreys (3); Drop: Humphreys
Ulster lineup: 1. Richard Mackey, 2. Allen Clarke, 3. Gary Leslie, 4. Jeremy Davidson, 5. Gary Longwell, 6. Bruce Cornelius, 7. Kevin McKee, 8. Roger Wilson, 9. Neil Doak, 10. David Humphreys, 11. Jan Cunningham, 12. Bill Harbinson (c), 13. Jonny Bell, 14. James Topping, 15. Stan McDowell.

1 November 1995	Ulster (Ireland)	54–10	(South Africa) Griqualand West	Ravenhill, Belfast
	Try: Topping (3); Wilkinson; McKinty; Cunningham; Penalty try Con: McCall (5); Pen: McCall; Drop: Wilkinson (2)	Report	Try: Ross; Buys
Ulster lineup: 1. Richard Mackey, 2. Allen Clarke, 3. Gary Leslie, 4. Davy Tweed, 5. Jeremy Davidson, 6. Stephen McKinty, 7. Denis McBride, 8. Paddy Johns, 9. Neil Doak, 10. Mark McCall, 11. Jan Cunningham, 12. Bill Harbinson (c), 13. Maurice Field, 14. James Topping, 15. Colin Wilkinson.

9 November 1995	Ulster (Ireland)	25–8	New Zealand Federation U23	Ravenhill, Belfast
	Try: Park; Doak; Field; Mackey; Con: McCall; Pen: McCall	Report	Try: McKearney; Pen: Mathie	Referee: D. Henderson
Ulster lineup: 1. Richard Mackey, 2. Stephen Ritchie, 3. Gary Leslie, 4. Gary Longwell, 5. Jeremy Davidson, 6. Bruce Cornelius, 7. Kevin McKee, 8. Stephen McKinty, 9. Neil Doak, 10. Mark McCall, 11. Graeme McCluskey, 12. Michael Rainey, 13. Maurice Field, 14. Andy Park, 15. Colin Wilkinson.				Referee: D. Henderson

14 November 1995	Ulster (Ireland)	20–30	(United Kingdom) Combined Services	Ravenhill, Belfast
	Try: Park; Ritchie; Con: McCall (2); Pen: McCall (2)	Report	Try: Brammer; Glasgow; Moore; Cross; Con: Worral (2); Pen: Worral (2)	Referee: P. O'Brien
Ulster lineup: 1. Simon Booth, 2. Stephen Ritchie, 3. Gary Leslie, 4. Gary Longwell, 5. Davy Tweed, 6. Bruce Cornelius, 7. Kevin McKee, 8. Roger Wilson, 9. Andrew Matchett, 10. Darryl Callaghan, 11. Graeme McCluskey, 12. Mark McCall, 13. Bill Harbinson (c), 14. Andy Park, 15. Robin Morrow.; Replacement: Stuart Duncan (for Wilson).				Referee: P. O'Brien

9 December 1995	Ulster (Ireland)	23–24	(Scotland) Edinburgh District	Ravenhill, Belfast
	Try: McCall; Pen: McCall (6)	Report	Try: Mather; Penalty try Con: Donaldson; Pen: Donaldson (3); Drop: Lang
Ulster lineup: 1. Richard Mackey, 2. Stephen Ritchie, 3. David Scott, 4. Murtagh Rea, 5. Gary Longwell, 6. Stephen McKinty, 7. Kevin McKee, 8. David Erskine, 9. Andrew Matchett, 10. Mark McCall, 11. Andy Park, 12. Bill Harbinson (c), 13. Maurice Field, 14. Graeme McCluskey, 15. Colin Wilkinson.

6 February 1996	Ulster (Ireland)	40–33	(Australia) New South Wales	Ravenhill, Belfast
	Try: Humphreys; McCall; Topping (2); Cunningham; Con: Humphreys (3); Pen: Humphreys; Drop: Humphreys; Wilkinson	Report	Try: Gavin; O'Kane; Bond; Harvey; Con: Wallace (2); Pen: Wallace (3)	Referee: A. Lewis
Ulster lineup: 1. Richard Mackey, 2. Allen Clarke, 3. Gary Leslie, 4. Davy Tweed, 5. Paddy Johns, 6. Stuart Duncan, 7. Kevin McKee, 8. Stephen McKinty, 9. Andrew Matchett, 10. David Humphreys, 11. Jan Cunningham, 12. Maurice Field, 13. Mark McCall, 14. James Topping, 15. Colin Wilkinson.; Replacement: Gary Longwell (for Duncan).				Referee: A. Lewis

== Friendlies ==
6 September 1995	Ballymena R.F.C. (Ireland)	11–27	(Ireland) Ulster	Eaton Park, Ballymena
	Try: Matchett; Pen: McAleese (2)	Report	Try: Doak; Christie; Dobbin; Rea; Con: McCall (2); Drop: McDowell	Referee: B. Stirling
Ulster lineup: 1. Richard Mackey, 2.Richard Weir, 3. Gary Leslie, 4. Murtagh Rea, 5. Simon Crawford, 6. Bruce Cornelius, 7. Roger Wilson, 8. Stephen McKinty, 9. Neil Doak, 10. Mark McCall, 11. Colin Christie, 12. Bill Harbinson (c), 13. Maurice Field, 14. Stephen Smyth, 15. Stan McDowell.; Replacements: Stephen Bell (for Doak), Crawford Dobbin (for Christie).				Referee: B. Stirling

== Ulster Women ==
The Ulster women's team was founded this season. Their first match was against the Combined Scottish Universities at Allen Park, Antrim, on 19 January 1996. The team selected consisted of players from Cooke, Antrim and Randalstown. Ireland international Karen Eagleson was captain. The Scottish Universities won 17-0.
