= List of Ulster Rugby players of the professional era =

A list of players who have appeared for Ulster Rugby since rugby union was declared open to professionalism on 26 August 1995.

== Current players ==
Ulster Rugby squad (Note: Taking into account signings and departures ahead of 2025–26 season as listed on List of 2026–27 United Rugby Championship transfers.)
**Props**: (Argentina) **Eduardo Bello**; (England) Sam Crean*; (South Africa) Keynan Knox*; (Ireland) **Eric O'Sullivan**; (Ireland) **Tom O'Toole**; (Ireland) Callum Reid; (Ireland) Scott Wilson; **Hookers**: (Ireland) **Rob Herring**; (Ireland) James McCormick; (Ireland) **Tom Stewart**; (England) Henry Walker; **Locks**: (Ireland) **Iain Henderson**; (Ireland) Joe Hopes; (Ireland) Charlie Irvine; (Ireland) **Cormac Izuchukwu**; (Ireland) Harry Sheridan; (Zimbabwe) Eli Snyman	**Back row**: (South Africa) Juarno Augustus; (England) Ben Donnell*; (Ireland) David McCann; (Ireland) James McNabney; (Ireland) Martin Moloney; (Ireland) **Nick Timoney**; (Ireland) Bryn Ward; **Scrum-halves**: (Ireland) Matthew Devine; (Ireland) **Nathan Doak**; (Ireland) Conor McKee; **Fly-halves**: (England) Jamie Benson*; (Ireland) Jake Flannery; (Ireland) Jack Murphy	**Centres**: (Ireland) Ben Carson; (Ireland) Daniel Hawkshaw; (Ireland) **James Hume**; (Ireland) **Stuart McCloskey**; (Ireland) Stewart Moore; (Ireland) Jude Postlethwaite; **Wings**: (Ireland) Aitzol Arenzana-King; (Ireland) **Robert Baloucoune**; (Ireland) Chay Mullins; (Ireland) **Jacob Stockdale**; (Ireland) Zac Ward; **Fullbacks**: (Ireland) **Michael Lowry**; (Ireland) Ethan McIlroy
(c) denotes the team captain, **Bold** denotes internationally capped players.^{*} denotes players qualified to play for Ireland on residency or dual nationality. ^{ST} denotes a short-term signing.

=== Jacob Boyd ===
Loosehead prop. Son of former Ulster prop Clem Boyd. Captained RBAI to the Ulster Schools' Cup in 2023, and was Boys' Schools Player of the Year in the 2023 Ulster Rugby Awards. Joined the Ulster academy in 2023. Played club rugby for Queen's University. Made 4 appearances for Ireland under-20 in the 2024 under-20 Six Nations, and 2 in the 2024 under-20 World Championships. Made his senior debut for Ulster against Benetton in February 2025.

Years	Team	Apps	Pts
2024	Ireland u-20	6	0
2024–	Queen's University	16	5
2025–	Ulster	1	0

Correct as of 7 March 2026

=== Tom Brigg ===
Flanker. Educated at Blackrock College, where he captained the team that made the Leinster Senior Schools' Cup final. Made one appearance for Ireland at under-20 level. Played club rugby for Queen's University RFC, and joined the Ulster academy in 2023. Made his senior debut for Ulster against Munster in April 2026.

Years	Team	Apps	Pts
2024	Ireland u-20	1	0
2024–	Queen's University	26	15
2025–	Ulster	1	0

Correct as of 24 April 2026

=== Ben Carson ===
Born 24 February 2002. Height 1.84 m (6 ft 1/2 in), weight 100 kg (16 st; 220 lb). Centre. Attended Wallace High School, Lisburn. Joined the Ulster academy in 2020. 4 caps in the 2021 u20 6 Nations. 2 caps in the 2022 u20 6 Nations. Played for Banbridge and Ballynahinch in the All-Ireland League. Signed a development contract in 2023. Made his senior Ulster debut from the bench away to Connacht in November 2023. Signed a three-year contract in December 2024.

Years	Team	Apps	Pts
2021–22	Ireland u-20	6	5
2021–23	Banbridge	14	15
2023–	Ballynahinch	8	0
2023–	Ulster	23	25

Correct as of 31 October 2026

=== Daniel Hawkshaw ===
Centre, born 22 May 2002. Brother of David and Sarah Hawkshaw. Attended Belvedere College. Played for Ireland u-20 under Richie Murphy, and Ireland 7s. Spent three seasons in the Connacht academy while playing for Buccaneers RFC, before being released, then joined Clontarf RFC. Joined Ulster on a one-year contract ahead of the 2026-27 season. Made his Ulster debut against Zebre Parma in the Challenge Cup on 17 October 2026.

Years	Team	Apps	Pts
2021–22	Ireland u-20	5	5
2025	Ireland Sevens	5	0
2021–22	Clontarf RFC	2	10
2022-25	Buccaneers RFC	12	10
2025-26	Clontarf RFC	10	5
2026–	Ulster	1	0

Correct as of 17 October 2026

=== Joe Hopes ===
Born 16 March 2004. Height 2.09 m (6 ft 10 1/2 in), weight 115 kg (18.1 st; 254 lb). Lock. Attended Campbell College. Ulster boys' schools player of the year 2022. Joined the Ulster academy in 2022. Made one appearance for Ireland U20 at the 2023 Six Nations Under 20s Championship, and one at the 2023 World Rugby U20 Championship. Made his senior debut from the bench away to Connacht in November 2023. Made five appearances for Ireland U20 at the 2024 Six Nations Under 20s Championship. Signed a development contract with Ulster in January 2025.

Years	Team	Apps	Pts
2023–	Queen's University	18	10
2023–24	Ireland u-20	7	0
2023–	Ulster	13	0

Correct as of 17 October 2026

=== Charlie Irvine ===
Lock. Born 28 January 2003. Height 2.03 m (6 ft 8 in), weight 118 kg (18.6 st; 260 lb). Attended Wallace High School, studying medicine at Queen's University while playing for their rugby club in the AIL. Played for Ireland u-20s. Played for Ulster 'A' in 2022. joined Ulster Academy in 2023. Made his senior debut against the Bulls in October 2024. Signed a development contract with Ulster in January 2025. Named in the Ireland 'A' squad for the February 2026 fixture against England 'A'.

Years	Team	Apps	Pts
2021	Queen's University	16	20
2022–23	Ireland u-20	9	0
2024–	Ulster	14	10
2026–	Ireland 'A'	1	0

Correct as of 22 May 2026

=== Tom McAllister ===
Tighthead prop. Educated at Ballyclare High School. Played club rugby with Ballynahinch, represented Ireland at under-20 level, and played for Ulster 'A' in 2024–25. Joined the Ulster academy in 2025. Made his senior debut against Edinburgh in March 2026.

Years	Team	Apps	Pts
2023–24	Belfast Harlequins		
2024–	Ballynahinch	16	25
2024–25	Ireland u-20	10	0
2026–	Ulster	9	5

Correct as of 31 October 2026

=== James McCormick ===
Born 8 January 2002. Height 1.82 m (5 ft 11 1/2 in), weight 107 kg (16.8 st; 236 lb). Hooker. Attended Dalriada School, where he was coached by former Ulster and Ireland prop Bryan Young. Joined the Ulster academy in 2020. Played for City of Armagh in the All-Ireland League. 5 caps at the 2022 u20 Six Nations, and 4 in the 2022 summer u20 internationals. Signed a development contract in 2023. Made his senior debut against Glasgow Warriors in September 2024.

Years	Team	Apps	Pts
2022	Ireland u-20	9	20
2022–	City of Armagh	22	75
2024–	Ulster	20	15

Correct as of 22 September 2026

=== Conor McKee ===
Born Belfast, 20 March 2001. Height 1.83 m (6 ft 0 in), weight 85 kg (13.4 st; 187 lb). Scrum-half. Attended Sullivan Upper School, where he was leading scorer in 2019. Represented Ireland in three matches in the 2021 under-20 Six Nations. Joined the Ulster academy in 2021. Played for Queen's University and Ballynahinch in the All-Ireland League. Signed a development contract in 2023, and a senior contract in 2024. He started Ulster's friendly against Queensland Reds in February 2025, and made his competitive debut in a home win against Scarlets in March.

He is a fourth-generation Ulster player: his father Kevin, grandfather Dermot and great-grandfather Harold all represented the province.

Years	Team	Apps	Pts
2021	Ireland u-20	3	0
2021–22	Queen's University	1	0
2022–25	Ballynahinch	29	57
2025–	Ulster	23	5

Correct as of 31 October 2026

=== James McKillop ===
Flanker/lock. Educated at Foyle College. Played club rugby for Queen's University RFC, and represented Ireland at under-20 level. Joined the Ulster academy in 2024. Made his senior debut for Ulster against Munster in April 2026.

Years	Team	Apps	Pts
2024–	Queen's University	16	20
2023–24	Ireland u-20	5	0
2026–	Ulster	5	0

Correct as of 24 October 2026

=== Jonny Scott ===
Centre. Attended Dromore High School. Played club rugby for Banbridge and Queen's University. Represented Ireland at u19 and u20 levels. First appeared for Ulster 'A' in May 2024. Joined the Ulster academy at the start of the 2024–25 season. Appeared for Ulster in a friendly against Edinburgh in September 2025. Made his senior debut from the bench against Connacht in May 2026.

Years	Team	Apps	Pts
2025	Ireland u-20	3	0
2024–25	Banbridge	7	15
2025–26	Queen's University	3	5
2026	Ulster	2	0

Correct as of 24 April 2026

=== Henry Walker ===
Hooker. Born 24 June 2005. Part of the Saracens under-18 team, later played for Hartpury University R.F.C. Joined Ulster academy in 2023. Played 13 times for the Ireland u20 team, scoring six tries. Promoted to senior squad on a development contract for the 2026-27 season. Made his debut against Edinburgh in September 2022.

Years	Team	Apps	Pts
2026-	Ireland u-20	13	6
2026-	Ulster	6	10

Correct as of 31 October 2026

== Former players ==
Active players in bold. Flags indicate internationally capped players.

=== A ===
Ross Adair | Will Addison (Ireland) | John Afoa (New Zealand) | Rodney Ah You (Ireland) | Michael Allen | T. J. Anderson | John Andrew | Ricky Andrew | Niall Annett | Sammy Arnold

==== David Allen ====
Back row. From Australia, but Irish-qualified. Attended Cranbrook School, Sydney, where he captained the first XV. Studied commerce at Sydney University while playing for Easts. Signed professional contract with Ulster in 2001. Made one start and one substitute appearance in 2001–02, but had to retire from the game with a neck injury. Took a job with JPMorgan Chase in London, becoming head of research in 2009. Did a PhD in quantitative finance at Cambridge University. Returned to Australia, where he continued to work in finance while coaching the colts at Easts. Became club president in 2021. Not to be confused with the English back row forward David Allen.

Years	Team	Apps	Pts
2001–02	Ulster	2	0

==== Azur Allison ====
Born 19 April 1999. Back row. He was educated at Ballymena Academy, captained the Ireland under-19 team in 2018, and joined the Ulster Academy ahead of the 2018–19 season. He made his senior competitive debut for Ulster against Leinster in the 2018–19 Pro14 on 20 December 2019, coming on as a replacement. in a 54–42 defeat. Allison has played for both Ballymena and Malone, rejoining Ballymena in 2021. He was no longer in the Ulster academy ahead of the 2022–23 season.

Years	Team	Apps	Pts
2019	Ulster	1	0

=== B ===
Tim Barker | Mark Bartholomeusz (Australia) | Angus Bell (Australia) | Jonny Bell (Ireland) | Mark Best | Neil Best (Ireland) | Rory Best (Ireland) | Simon Best (Ireland) | Ali Birch | Callum Black | Mark Blair | Isaac Boss (Ireland) | BJ Botha (South Africa) | Tommy Bowe (Ireland) | Frank Bradshaw Ryan | Nigel Brady | Robby Brink (South Africa) | Warren Brosnihan (South Africa) | Peter Browne | Billy Burns (Ireland) | David Busby

==== Corrie Barrett ====
Prop. Born 13 June 1998. Height 1.77 m (5 ft 9 1/2 in), weight 120 kg (19 st; 260 lb). His father Brian was an Ireland u21 international. Attended Royal Belfast Academical Institution, with whom he won the Ulster Schools' Cup in 2016. Played for Ulster u19 and Ulster 'A', and appeared for the senior team from the bench in a friendly against Uruguay in 2018. Spent some time in New Zealand as part of the Otago youth setup, before returning to Ireland to play for Banbridge, Garryowen and Munster 'A', and was part of the Ireland Club XV that won the Dalriada Cup in 2020. Joined Bedford Blues in 2021, and moved to Doncaster Knights in 2023. Signed for Ulster one a one-year contract after a successful pre-season trial in 2024. Made his senior competitive debut against Glasgow Warriors in September 2024. He left Ulster at the end of the season. He joined Plymouth Albion R.F.C. on a short term basis in April 2026. After Plymouth were eliminated in the National League 1 playoff, he played for Blackheath in the Champ Accession Final, defeating London Scottish to win promotion to Champ Rugby. He joined Rotherham Titans ahead of the 2026-27 season.

Years	Team	Apps	Pts
2021–23	Bedford Blues	36	0
2022	→ Saracens	1	0
2023–24	Doncaster Knights	22	0
2024–25	Ulster	9	15
2026	Plymouth Albion		
2026	Blackheath		
2026-	Rotherham Titans		

==== Stephen Bell ====
Born 21 April 1975. Scrum-half, played for Malone and Dungannon. Made one substitute appearance for Ulster in 1995–96; one Heineken Cup and three Interpro starts in 1996–97; two starts and one substitute appearances in the Heineken Cup, two starts in the Interpros and one in a friendly in 1997–98; five starts and one substitute appearances in the 1998–99 Heineken Cup, three starts and one sub in the interpros, and one start and one sub in representative matches; four starts and one sub in the Heineken Cup and four starts and one sub in the interpros in 1999–2000; and one substitute appearance in the Heineken Cup, four substitute appearances in the interpros, and one start and one substitute appearance in friendlies in 2000–01. Played for Ireland A. Part of the Dungannon team that won the All-Ireland League in 2001. Went on to play for Bedford Blues, where he was captain. Became a fitness instructor. In 1998 he walked the length of Ireland barefoot in 22 days, from Castletownbere, County Cork, to his hometown of Ballintoy, County Antrim, to raise money for the Northern Ireland Forest School Association.

Years	Team	Apps	Pts
1995–2001	Ulster	37	15

==== Simon Booth ====
Ballymena loosehead prop. Played for Ulster from 1993 to 1996. Represented Ulster in all four matches in the 1994 Interprovincial Championship, representative matches against the Scottish Saltires, the Basque Country, the South of Scotland and Glasgow District in 1994, one appearance from the bench against Leinster in the 1995 Interprovincial Championship, and a start in a representative match against Combined Services in November 1995.

Years	Team	Apps	Pts
1993–96	Ulster	10	0

==== Clem Boyd ====
Born 8 November 1973. Prop. Attended RBAI, studied Mechanical Engineering at Edinburgh University and played for Edinburgh Currie RFC. Represented Ireland at under-21 level. Selected for Ulster in an Interpro against Leinster in 1996. Went professional with Bedford in 1996, then to Bath in 1999. Returned to Belfast in 2000 to look after his sick father, and was approached to join the Ulster squad. Played club rugby with Belfast Harlequins. Made two starts and three substitute appearances for Ulster in the 2000–01 Heineken Cup, one start and one substitute appearance in the Interprovincial Championship, and started three friendlies the same season. The following season he made three substitute appearances in the Heineken Cup, three starts and four substitute appearances in the Celtic League, and started three friendlies. Played for Ireland A. He retired from professional rugby in 2003 due to a heart condition. Since retiring he has coached Bangor and Instonians. Son Jacob joined the Ulster academy in 2023.

Years	Team	Apps	Pts
1996–2003	Ulster	22	0

==== Spencer Bromley ====
Born 12 December 1969, Manchester. Wing/centre. Represented England at under-21 and A level. Played for Harlequins 1997–98, Beziers 1998–99. Joined Ulster in 1999, playing his club rugby with Belfast Harlequins. Made four starts in the Heineken Cup, four in the Interprovincial Championship (scoring four tries), and started a friendly against an Ireland XV. Released in 2000 following an IRFU ruling on foreign players, and joined Worcester.

Years	Team	Apps	Pts
1999–2000	Ulster	8	20

==== Gary Brown ====
Born 23 February 1974, Portadown. Back row. Attended Royal School Armagh, played for Ulster and Ireland Schools, and Portadown. Played for Celtic Warriors XV, a combined Ulster-Scottish Borders team, in a friendly against Ulster in December 2002. Offered a development contract with Ulster in 2003 but turned it down due to work commitments to his land surveying business. Moved to Belfast Harlequins in 2004, put his business on hold, trained with Ulster in the off-season, and accepted a development contract. Made his debut in a pre-season friendly against the Dragons, and got game time in the regular season as a result of injuries to Andy Ward, Neil McMillan and Roger Wilson. Made 1 start and 3 substitute appearances in 2004–05. No longer in squad in 2005–06.

Years	Team	Apps	Pts
2004–05	Ulster	4	0

=== C ===
Ryan Caldwell (Ireland) | Kieran Campbell (Ireland) | Sam Carter (Australia) | Darren Cave (Ireland) | Allen Clarke (Ireland) | Marcell Coetzee (South Africa) | Ryan Constable (Australia) | John Cooney (Ireland) | Tom Court (Ireland) | Mark Crick (United States) | Bryn Cunningham | Jan Cunningham

==== Aaron Cairns ====
Born 7 October 1992. Scrum-half. Represented Ireland Sevens. Played for Ballynahinch. Joined Ulster academy in 2016. Appeared from the bench, scoring a try, against Edinburgh in November 2016. Promoted to senior squad in 2017. Made one senior appearance against Leinster in October 2017. No longer in Ulster's squad the following season.

Years	Team	Apps	Pts
2016–17	Ulster	2	5

==== Darryl Callaghan ====
Out-half, played for Dungannon and Ballynahinch. Appeared for Ulster in a representative match against Combined Services in November 1995. Played for Celtic Warriors XV, a combined Ulster-Scottish Borders team, in a friendly against Ulster in December 2002.

Years	Team	Apps	Pts
1995	Ulster	1	0

==== John Campbell ====
Prop. Signed from Terenure 2000. Made two substitute appearances in 2000–01, and one substitute appearance in 2001–02.

Years	Team	Apps	Pts
2000–02	Ulster	3	0

==== Jarlath Carey ====
Born 23 April 1977. Prop. Played for Belfast Harlequins, then Rotherham Titans. Signed by Ulster 2007. Made one appearance from the bench against Portugal in November 2008. Released 2009.

Years	Team	Apps	Pts
2008	Ulster	1	0

==== Chris Cochrane ====
Wing, born Ballymoney, 18 December 1988. He was educated at Coleraine Academical Institution, leaving in 2007. He was selected in the Ireland squad for the 2008 IRB Junior World Championship. While in the Ulster Rugby academy, he made his first appearance for the senior provincial side in a friendly against Bath in 2008, and his competitive debut, scoring a try, against Leinster in 2011. He was awarded a development contract with Ulster ahead of the 2012–13 season. He retired prior to the 2014–15 season, having made nine appearances and scored two tries.

Years	Team	Apps	Pts
2008–14	Ulster	9	10

==== Bruce Cornelius ====
New Zealand-born back row forward, played for Instonians. Appeared for Ulster in a representative match against the Scottish Saltires in 1994, and in representative matches against Côte Basque Select XV, New Zealand Federation Under-23 and Combined Services and a friendly against Ballymena in 1995.

Years	Team	Apps	Pts
1994–95	Ulster	4	0

==== Sheldon Coulter ====
Born 1 February 1977. centre/wing/fullback, played for Ballymena. Made two starts in the Heineken Cup, two in the Interprovincial Championship and two in friendlies in 1996–97; 1 start in the Heineken Cup and friendly in 1997–98; started all nine matches in Ulster's victorious 1998–99 Heineken Cup campaign in 1998–99, as well as one start and two substitute appearances in the Interprovincial Championship and one start and two substitute appearances in representative matches the same season; made two substitute appearances in the Heineken Cup, one start in the Interprovincial Championship, and one start and two substitute appearances in 2000–01; two starts and one sub in the Heineken Cup, 4 starts and 1 sub in the Celtic League, 1 start and 1 sub in the Interpros, and 2 starts and 1 sub in friendlies in 2001–02; and 2 starts and 2 subs in the Heineken Cup, and 3 starts and 1 sub in the Celtic League in 2002–03. Released in 2003. Joined Portadown as player/coach in 2004.

Years	Team	Apps	Pts
1996–2003	Ulster	46	15

==== Jerry Cronin ====
Born Mallow, Cork, 8 April 1984. Prop. His father Billy played for Munster. Played for Mallow, UCC. Studied structural engineering, and a job opportunity brought him to Belfast. Joined Ballynahinch, with whom he won the All-Ireland Senior Cup, in 2009, as well as the Ulster Senior League and Ulster Senior Cup. Signed by Ulster as injury cover in 2010. Made 11 appearances, and was signed to a senior contract the following season. In 2011–12 he made seven appearances. Moved to Doncaster Knights in 2012.

Years	Team	Apps	Pts
2010–12	Ulster	18	0
2012–13	Doncaster Knights	10	0

==== Reuben Crothers ====
Born 28 January 2002. Height 1.88 m (6 ft 2 in), weight 102 kg (16.1 st; 225 lb). Back row. Attended Wallace High School, Lisburn, studied law at Queen's University, and played club rugby for Ballynahinch. Joined the Ulster academy in 2020. Captained the Ireland under-20s to a Grand Slam in the under-20 Six Nations in 2022, and made four appearances in the 2022 under-20 summer internationals. Signed a development contract with Ulster in 2023. Made 5 appearances, scoring a try, for Ulster in 2023–24. He retired at the end of the 2024–25 season.

Years	Team	Apps	Pts
2021–22	Ireland u-20	13	15
2021–	Ballynahinch	29	5
2023–25	Ulster	7	5

==== Angus Curtis ====
Centre/out-half, born 26 March 1998 in Harare, Zimbabwe. Curtis' father is David Curtis, who won 13 caps for Ireland between 1991 and 1992, including several at the 1991 Rugby World Cup, before returning to Zimbabwe, where he currently runs the Stables Winery. Curtis' grandfather, Arthur, also won 3 caps for Ireland in 1950. Curtis first began playing rugby while at primary school in Zimbabwe, before earning a scholarship to play cricket and rugby for Hilton College in South Africa when he was 13, and only decided to focus on rugby in his final year at school, having become involved with the Sharks under-18's side.

He moved to Ireland in January 2017, joining the Ulster Academy and studying for a degree in economics with finance at Queens University Belfast. He was selected for Ireland in the 2018 Six Nations Under 20s Championship, playing at inside centre. He made his senior debut for Ulster in their 36–15 win against Scottish side Glasgow Warriors in round 17 of the 2017–18 Pro14 on 21 April 2018. He signed a development contract to join the senior squad for the 2018–19 season, which was upgraded to a full senior contract in June 2019.

Since then he struggled with injuries. He missed much of the 2018–19 season with a number of injuries, returning to action during the early part of the 2019–20 season, before sustaining an anterior cruciate ligament injury in December 2019 which kept him out for over sixteen months. He returned to action during the Pro14 Rainbow Cup in 2021. He made his first Champions Cup start against Clermont in January 2022. He retired on medical advice in January 2024 following a series of concussions, having made 24 appearances and scored two tries.

Years	Team	Apps	Pts
2018–24	Ulster	24	10

=== D ===
Matthew Dalton | Simon Danielli (Scotland) | Adam D'Arcy | Jeremy Davidson (Ireland) | Kieron Dawson (Ireland) | Carlo Del Fava (Italy) | Rob Dewey (Scotland) | Jean Deysel (South Africa) | Robbie Diack (Ireland) | Neil Doak | Sean Doyle

==== Jonathan Davis ====
Wing. Made two starts in the 1998 Interprovincial Championship, and one in the representative match against Glasgow District in August 1998.

Years	Team	Apps	Pts
1998	Ulster	3	0

==== Wilhelm de Klerk ====
Centre, born in South Africa, 16 August 2004. Moved to Ireland with his family as a child. Played minis in Malahide RFC, Attended St Andrew's College and St Michael's College. Played for the Ireland u-20s under Richie Murphy. Joined the Ulster academy in 2024. Made his senior debut in December 2024 from the bench against Connacht. He left the Ulster academy at the end of the 2025-26 season.

Years	Team	Apps	Pts
2023–24	University College Dublin	9	5
2024–	Queen's University	25	25
2024	Ireland u-20	6	0
2024–	Ulster	3	0

Correct as of 15 May 2026

==== Lorcan Dow ====
Born 27 January 1995. Back row. Represented Ireland under-20. Joined Ulster academy in 2014. One appearance in the Pro12 in 2015–16. Also played for Ulster A in the British and Irish Cup in 2015–17. Went on to play for Richmond and Esher.

Years	Team	Apps	Pts
2015–16	Ulster	1	0

==== Stuart Duncan ====
Back row forward, played for Malone. Made one representative start in 1992–93. Started both Heineken Cup matches and all four Interpros, as well as one representative start, and one representative substitute appearance, in 1995–96. In 1996–97 he started all four Heineken Cup matches and all three Interpros, as well as the friendly against Australia. In 1997–98 he had one friendly start. In 1998–99 he made four substitute appearances in the victorious Heineken Cup campaign, two substitute appearances in the Interprovincial Championship, and one start and one sub in representative matches.

Years	Team	Apps	Pts
1992–99	Ulster	25	15

=== E ===
Paul Emerick (United States) | David Erskine (Ireland) | Dave Ewers

==== Mark Edwards ====
Born 2 July 1974. Scrum half. Made two starts and one substitute appearance in the Heineken Cup, one start in the Interprovincial Championship, and one start in a friendly against an Ireland XV in 1999–2000.

Years	Team	Apps	Pts
1999–2000	Ulster	4	15

=== F ===
Matt Faddes | Willie Faloon | Chris Farrell (Ireland) | Campbell Feather | Stephen Ferris (Ireland) | Maurice Field (Ireland) | Declan Fitzpatrick (Ireland) | Justin Fitzpatrick (Ireland) | James French

==== Riaz Fredericks ====
Born 13 July 1973, South Africa. Centre. Signed from the Hong Kong sevens team 1999. Made two starts in the Heineken Cup, 1 start and three substitute appearances in the Interprovincial Championship, and 1 start in a friendly, in 1999–2000. Released at the end of the season.

Years	Team	Apps	Pts
1999–2000	Ulster	6	5

==== Brad Free ====
Born 10 June 1971. Scrum half. Born in Queensland, Australia, to an Irish mother. Played for Saracens, and represented Ireland A in 1997, but had a serious ankle injury in that match. After recovering from injury, played for Bective Rangers and was an unused substitute for Leinster before sustaining a neck injury. Signed by Ulster in 2000. Started all six Heineken Cup matches, scoring 1 try, all six Interpro matches, scoring 1 try, and two friendlies in 2000–01. Made 2 starts and 2 substitute appearances, scoring 1 try, in 2001–02. Emigrated to the US in 2002.

Years	Team	Apps	Pts
2000–02	Ulster	15	15

==== Rowan Frost ====
Born 9 June 1975. Lock. Born in England, brought up in New Zealand. Signed for Connacht 2000. Signed for Ulster 2003. Made 16 starts and 9 substitute appearances, scoring two tries, in 2003–04. In 2004–05 he made 9 starts and 14 substitute appearances, scoring 1 try. In 2005–06 he made 2 starts and 9 substitute appearances. Moved to Montauban in 2006, sent four season with them in the Top14, and one at Blagnac in Federale 1.

Years	Team	Apps	Pts
2000–03	Connacht		
2003–06	Ulster	58	15
2006–10	Montauban	81	0
2011–12	Blagnac	18	0

=== G ===
Craig Gilroy (Ireland)

==== Keith Gallick ====
Back row forward, played for City of Derry. Started all six Heineken Cup matches and one Interpro in 1997–98.

Years	Team	Apps	Pts
1997–98	Ulster	7	5

==== Conor Gaston ====
Born 5 August 1990. Wing. Joined Ulster academy in 2009. Made two starts and one substitute appearance in 2010–11 season, and one start and one substitute appearance in 2011–12. Moved to London Irish in 2012. Has since played for Aurillac, Verona Rugby, Ciencias Rugby Sevilla and Vienne.

Years	Team	Apps	Pts
2010–12	Ulster	6	0

=== H ===
Sam Harding (New Zealand) | Justin Harrison (Australia) | Chris Henry (Ireland) | Wiehahn Herbst | Brett Herron | Tamaiti Horua | Bruce Houston | Tyrone Howe (Ireland) | David Humphreys (Ireland) | Ian Humphreys | Hayden Hyde

==== Aaron Hall ====
Back row, born Ballynahinch, 26 June 1998. He was educated at Ballyclare Secondary School, played club rugby for Ballynahinch, and was selected at age-grade level for Ulster. In 2015 he won the Ulster Youth Player of the Year Award. He joined the Ulster academy ahead of the 2016–17 season. He made his senior competitive debut the following season, starting in a 23–22 win against Benetton in the Pro14 on 24 November 2017. He played for Ulster 'A' in the 2017–18 British and Irish Cup, and the 2018–19 and 2019–20 Celtic Cup. He remained in the academy for a fourth year in 2019–20, but was no longer listed in the academy squad the following season. He joined Ballyclare RFC ahead of the 2020–21 season, having previously played for them at youth level.

Years	Team	Apps	Pts
2017	Ulster	1	0

==== Kieran Hallett ====
Born 2 June 1985. Out-half. Represented Ireland at under-21 level. Signed from Bedford Blues 2007. Made one appearance from the bench against Newport Gwent Dragons in October 2007. Went on to play for Plymouth Albion, Nottingham and Cornish Pirates.

Years	Team	Apps	Pts
2007	Ulster	1	0

==== Neil Hanna ====
Born 7 January 1981. Hooker. Signed from Rotherham Titans 2007, but missed the whole of his first season with a knee injury. Started against Portugal in September 2008, and made one appearance from the bench against Scarlets in the Celtic League in May 2009. Released 2009.

Years	Team	Apps	Pts
2008–09	Ulster	2	0

==== Bill Harbinson ====
Centre. Attended Banbridge Academy. Played for Malone. First selected for Ulster for a tour of Italy in 1986, and made his debut against Italy B. Moved to London Irish in 1987, but still turned out for Malone on occasion. Called up for Ireland tour to France in May 1988, playing against the Cote Basque Select XV in Biarritz. Returned to Malone in 1989. Captained Ulster in 1995–96, starting both Heineken Cup matches, all four interpros, four representative matches and one friendly, before retiring.

Years	Team	Apps	Pts
1986–96	Ulster	36	42

==== Mike Haslett ====
Back row. Born 14 July 1978. Played for Dungannon and captained Cambridge University. Made one appearance for Ulster off the bench against Swansea in August 2001. Signed for London Irish after a six-week trial in 2002.

Years	Team	Apps	Pts
2001	Ulster	1	0

==== Henry Head ====
Born 30 March 1980. Lock. Played for England schools. Played club rugby for Ballymena. Played two pre-season friendlies for Ulster against London Irish and Rotherham in 2005, earning a development contract. Made one appearance from the bench against Ospreys in November 2005. Released in 2006, and joined Rotherham Titans, joining former Ballymena coach André Bester.

Years	Team	Apps	Pts
2005	Ulster	1	0

==== Michael Heaney ====
Scrum-half, born Belfast 5 November 1990. Educated at Methodist College Belfast. Joined the Ulster academy in 2009. Played for Doncaster Knights 2011–12, making nine appearances and scoring five tries. Promoted from academy to full Ulster squad 2012. Appeared for Emerging Ireland at the 2013 Tbilisi Cup. Played for Ulster for three seasons, making 28 appearances and scoring one try. Rejoined Doncaster Knights in 2015, playing there three seasons, making 80 appearances and scoring 11 tries. Then moved to Worcester Warriors for three seasons, making 38 appearances and scoring two tries.

Years	Team	Apps	Pts
2011–12	Doncaster Knights	9	0
2012–15	Ulster	28	5
2015–18	Doncaster Knights	80	55
2018–21	Doncaster Knights	38	10
2013	Emerging Ireland	2	0

==== Grant Henderson ====
Born 7 February 1978. Fullback. Signed from Natal 2000. Made 4 starts in the Heineken Cup, 6 in the Interprovincial Championship, and 2 in friendlies in 2000–01. Returned to South Africa, signing for SWD Eagles, in 2001.

Years	Team	Apps	Pts
2000–01	Ulster	10	0

==== Kenton Hillman ====
Scrum-half, played for Instonians. Represented Ulster in a friendly against London Irish in August 1996, and in one match in the 1997 Interprovincial Championship.

Years	Team	Apps	Pts
1997	Ulster	1	0

==== James Humphreys ====
Born 4 November 2001. Height 1.85 m (6 ft 1 in), weight 84 kg (13.2 st; 185 lb). Fly-half. Son of David Humphreys. Attended Dean Close School in Cheltenham. Played scrum-half at school. Studied geography at Queen's University. Two caps for Ireland in the 2021 under-20 Six Nations. Played for Ulster A 2020–21. Joined the Ulster academy from Gloucester academy in 2021. Played for Queen's University and Banbridge in the All-Ireland League. Signed a development contract in 2024. Made his senior debut from the bench, scoring two conversions, against the Bulls in October 2024. Upgraded to a senior contract in January 2025. He left Ulster at the end of the 2025-26 season, and joined Ealing Trailfinders.

Years	Team	Apps	Pts
2021	Ireland u-20	2	2
2022–23	Banbridge	12	71
2023–24	Queen's University	14	97
2024–	Ballynahinch	8	2
2024–2026	Ulster	7	8
2026-	Ealing Trailfinders		

Correct as of 7 July 2026

=== I ===
==== Rab Irwin ====
Robert "Rab" Irwin, born 20 November 1963. Prop, played for Ballymena. In 1997–98 he made 4 starts in the Heineken Cup, 1 substitute appearance in the Interprovincial Championship, and 1 substitute appearance in a friendly. In 1998–99 he started 7 of the nine matches of the victorious Heineken Cup campaign, including the final, as well as 1 start and 1 substitute appearance in the Interprovincial Championship, and 1 start and 2 substitute appearance in representative matches. In 1999–2000 he started one match in the Interprovincial Championship, and came off the bench in friendly against an Ireland XV.

Years	Team	Apps	Pts
1997–2000	Ulster	20	5

=== J ===
Paddy Jackson (Ireland) | Paddy Johns (Ireland) | Bill Johnston

==== Michael Jackson ====
Born 16 January 1974. Centre, played for Blackrock. Made three starts in the Heineken Cup, scoring one try, and one start in a friendly in 1997–98.

Years	Team	Apps	Pts
1997–98	Ulster	3	5

==== Paul Jackson ====
Born 24 June 1989. Hooker. Joined academy 2014. Promoted from Academy 2015. Played for Ulster A in the British and Irish Cup, and made one senior appearance in 2015–16.

Years	Team	Apps	Pts
2015–16	Ulster	1	0

==== Lewis Johnston ====
Prop. Played for Ballynahinch. Came off the bench in one match of the 1999 Interprovincial Championship.

Years	Team	Apps	Pts
1999	Ulster	1	0

==== Greg Jones ====
Back row, born 3 January 1996, in Sandycove, Dublin, where he attended St. Andrew's College. He represented Leinster up to 'A' level, and was part of the Ireland under-20s team that beat New Zealand at the 2016 World Rugby Under 20 Championship.

He joined the Ulster academy from University College Dublin in the summer of 2017. He made his senior Ulster debut on 24 November 2017 in round 9 of the 2017–18 Pro14, featuring off the bench in the province's 23–22 win against Italian side Benetton. He signed a senior contract ahead of the 2018–19 season. He left Ulster at the end of the 2023–24 season, having made 44 appearances and scored five tries.

Years	Team	Apps	Pts
2017–24	Ulster	44	25

==== Conor Joyce ====
Born 5 July 1993. Back row. Joined Ulster academy 2011. Made his senior debut off the bench against Leinster in December 2011. Made one appearance in 2012–13, and two in 2013–14. Promoted to senior squad 2014. Moved to Jersey Reds in 2017, and later played for Doncaster.

Years	Team	Apps	Pts
2011–17	Ulster	6	0

=== K ===
Ross Kane | Aidan Kearney | Mick Kearney | Robbi Kempson (South Africa) | Angus Kernohan | Steven Kitshoff (South Africa) | Werner Kok | Andi Kyriacou

=== L ===
Adam Larkin | Scott LaValla (United States) | Christian Leali'ifano (Australia) (Samoa) | Gary Leslie | Angus Lloyd | Gary Longwell (Ireland) | Louis Ludik | Ricky Lutton

==== Stuart Laing ====
Born 5 July 1976. Out-half/fullback, played for Instonians and Portadown. Scotland 'A' international. Played one representative match against Glasgow District in 1994. Moved to Scotland for a couple of seasons, where he represented the Exiles in the District Championship and played for Scotland A. Returned to Ulster and started all three Interpros (scoring 1 try, 4 conversions and 11 penalties), a representative match against Australia (scoring 2 conversions and 2 penalties), and three friendlies (scoring 7 conversions and 1 penalty) in 1996. Started all 6 Heineken Cup matches (scoring 4 conversions, 18 penalties and one drop-goal), all three Interpros (scoring 3 conversions, 5 penalties and one drop-goal) and one friendly in 1997.

Years	Team	Apps	Pts
1994–97	Ulster	15	173

=== M ===
Adam Macklin | Ian Madigan (Ireland) | Kevin Maggs (Ireland) | Seamus Mallon | Niall Malone (Ireland) | Luke Marshall (Ireland) | Paul Marshall (Ireland) | Simon Mason (Ireland) | Alby Mathewson (New Zealand) | Andy Maxwell | Paddy McAllister | Denis McBride (Ireland) | Adam McBurney | Kyle McCall | Mark McCall (Ireland) | Ronan McCormack | Mark McCrea | Matt McCullough (Ireland) | Michael McDonald | Greg McGrath | Jack McGrath (Ireland) | Paul McKenzie | Neil McMillan | Johnny McPhillips | Tony McWhirter | Gareth Milasinovich | Eric Miller (Ireland) | Caleb Montgomery | Declan Moore | Rod Moore (Australia) | Aidan Morgan | Ben Moxham | Johann Muller (South Africa) | Jonny Murphy | Jordi Murphy (Ireland) | Ruaidhrí Murphy | Matt Mustchin (Scotland)

==== Dean Macartney ====
Born 5 May 1969. Back row forward, played for Ballymena. Represented Ulster 1991–99. Original captain of the team that went on the win the Heineken Cup in 1999, season shortened by injury.

Years	Team	Apps	Pts
1991–99	Ulster	12	4

==== Richard Mackey ====
Loosehead prop Richard Mackey (born 23 November 1969) started his rugby career with his home town club Dromore. He moved to Malone in 1989, eventually becoming club captain. He was first selected for Ulster in November 1994 in a representative match against the South of Scotland. He started both Heineken Cup matches, all four Interprovincial matches, five out of six representative matches and one friendly in 1995–96; all four Heineken Cup matches, all three Interprovincial matches, a representative match against Australia and three friendlies in 1996–97; and three out of six Heineken Cup matches, all three Interpros and one friendly in 1997–98. Internationally, he played for Ireland 'A'. In 2000 he moved to Dungannon, with whom he won the All-Ireland League in 2001. He returned to Dromore in 2002 as player-coach.

Years	Team	Apps	Pts
1994–98	Ulster	27	10

==== Andrew Matchett ====
Born 25 May 1969. Played scrum-half for Portadown, Ballymena, Bedford, Belfast Harlequins, and Ulster, with whom he won the 1998–99 Heineken Cup. Educated at Edenderry Primary School, where he was introduced to mini-rugby, then Killicomaine Junior High School and Portadown College. Played for Ulster and Ireland at schools and under-21 level. Joined Portadown Rugby Club, where his father Marshall was president. He was first selected for Ulster in 1990. After being an unused substitute against Yorkshire on 1 September, he made his representative debut against Spain on 4 September, while a Business Studies student at the University of Ulster. After Portadown failed to gain promotion to the All-Ireland League, he moved to AIL club Ballymena in 1991. In March 1997 he signed a short-term contract with Bedford in Division 2 of the Courage League. After they were promoted to Division 1 he was offered a full-time contract for the following season, but turned it down. In the summer of 1997 he was selected for an Ireland Development tour to New Zealand and Western Samoa. He was selected a number of times on the bench for Ireland A, without being capped. He captained Ulster against the Spanish Barbarians in San Sebastian in June 1998. He was part of Ulster's 1998–99 Heineken Cup-winning team, while holding a day job in insurance. The final was his 60th Ulster cap. Joined Belfast Harlequins in 1999. He retired from senior rugby in 2003, but in 2005 was recalled to the Harlequins first team due to injuries at scrum-half, and helped them to the All-Ireland League final, which they lost to Shannon. In 2005 he organised, and appeared in, an Ulster European Cup Reunion XV to against Clogher Valley in the first match on their new pitch. Represented the Irish Rugby Legends at the World Rugby Legends Festival in South Africa in 2006.

Years	Team	Apps	Pts
1990–99	Ulster	55	37

==== Chris McCarey ====
Born 11 January 1979. Back row forward. Played for Ulster 2000–01.

Years	Team	Apps	Pts
1998–2001	Ulster	3	5

==== Graeme McCluskey ====
Wing, played for Portadown. Started one representative game in 1993–94, one interpro and one representative in 1994–95, 3 representative games in 1995–96, and one interpro in 1997–98.

Years	Team	Apps	Pts
1992–98	Ulster	7	14

==== Neil McCluskey ====
Born 9 March 1974. Wing, played for Queens. Made one start and one substitute appearance in the Heineken Cup in 1996–97, and started one representative match in 1998–99.

Years	Team	Apps	Pts
1996–99	Ulster	4	0

==== Mike McComish ====
Back row, born Belfast, 7 December 1983. Educated at Campbell College. Played club rugby for Ballymena. Played for Rotherham Titans (2006–08), making 37 appearances and scoring 11 tries, and Otley (2008–09), making 22 appearances. Joined Connacht in 2009 and played there for two seasons, making 36 appearances and scoring two tries. Joined Ulster in 2011, played there for four seasons, making 46 appearances and scoring two tries. Released in 2015.

Years	Team	Apps	Pts
2011–15	Ulster	46	10

==== Neil McComb ====
Lock, born 15 July 1983. Educated at Campbell College, and captained them to victory over Methodist College in the Ulster Schools' Cup final in 2002. Promoted from the Ulster academy to the senior squad in 2010. Left Ulster in 2015, having made 43 appearances and scored one try. Went on to play club rugby for Belfast Harlequins.

Years	Team	Apps	Pts
2009–15	Ulster	43	5

==== Stan McDowell ====
Born 10 February 1971. Utility back (centre, fullback, wing), played for Dungannon. Made one representative appearance from the bench in 1992–93; one representative sub in 1993–94; one representative start and two subs in 1993–94; one interpro sub in 1994–95; started one representative match and one friendly in 1995–96; make two starts in the Heineken Cup and two in the interpros in 1997–98; started one match and appeared twice from the bench in the 1998–99 Heineken Cup campaign, and started two interpros and three representative matches that season. Later coached the Ireland women's sevens team.

Years	Team	Apps	Pts
1992–99	Ulster	24	35

==== Rory McGuire ====
Tighthead prop, born 26 August 2002. Height 1.92 m (6 ft 3 1/2 in), weight 124 kg (19.5 st; 273 lb). Grew up in Winnetka, Illinois, before attending Blackrock College in County Dublin. Selected for Leinster and Ireland at age-grade level. Part of Richie Murphy's 2022 Grand Slam-winning Ireland under-20 team. Studied mechanical engineering at University College Dublin, and played for UCD's rugby team in the AIL. Joined the Leinster academy in 2022. Made eight appearances for the Leinster senior team, before joining Ulster in 2025. He left Ulster at the end of the 2025-26 season.

Years	Team	Apps	Pts
2021–22	Ireland u-20	5	5
2021–25	University College Dublin	17	10
2025–	City of Armagh	4	0
2023–25	Leinster	8	0
2025–26	Ulster	1	0

==== Blane McIlroy ====
Scrum-half, born 4 December 1991. Attended Methodist College Belfast, and played club rugby for Ballynahinch and Ballymena. Joined the Ulster academy 2010. Made two appearances from the bench in 2011–12. Was charged with, and acquitted of, exposure as part of the trial that saw fellow Ulster players Paddy Jackson and Stuart Olding acquitted of rape in 2018.

Years	Team	Apps	Pts
2011–12	Ulster	2	0

==== David McIlwaine ====
Born 9 May 1989. Wing. Did not play rugby at school, but played for Larne Rugby Club from 5 to 18, where he was spotted by Neil Doak. Played age-grade rugby for Ulster, and club rugby for Queen's University. Joined the Ulster academy 2010, made 1 start and 2 substitute appearances in the Heineken Cup and 1 start and three substitute appearances in the Celtic League in the 2010–11 season. Moved to Doncaster Knights for a season, then to Bristol Bears. Returned to Ulster 2013. Made 1 substitute appearance in the Heineken Cup, and three starts and four substitute appearance in the Celtic League in 2013–14 season. Moved to Yorkshire Carnegie in 2014. Signed for Doncaster Knights for a second time in 2016.

Years	Team	Apps	Pts
2010–16	Ulster	20	0

==== Kevin McKee ====
Back row forward, played for Instonians. Made one representative start in 1992–93, one in 1993–94, one in 1994–95, five in 1995–96, one friendly substitute appearance in 1997–98, and one representative start in 1998–99.

Years	Team	Apps	Pts
1992–99	Ulster	11	10

==== James McKinney ====
Born 3 January 1991. Out-half. Joined the Ulster academy in 2009, promoted to senior squad 2011. Made 1 start and 1 substitute appearance in 2011–12. Moved to Rotherham Titans in 2012. Returned to Ulster in 2013. Made four starts and six substitute appearances in the Pro12 in the 2013–14 season. Returned to Rotherham Titans in 2014, then moved to Jersey in 2016 and Verona in 2017. After that he had a stint in Australia and as a medical joker in Japan.

Years	Team	Apps	Pts
2011–14	Ulster	12	47

==== Stephen McKinty ====
Born 7 July 1966. Back row forward, played for Bangor. Made two representative starts in 1990–91; three in 1991–92; four Interpro and four representative starts in 1992-23; four Interpro and three representative starts in 1993–94; four interpro and four representative starts in 1994–95; four representative and one friendly start in 1995–96; four Heineken Cup, three Interpro, one representative and two friendly starts in 1996–97; six Heineken Cup, was captain in 1997–98, making three interpro and one friendly start; started all nine matches of Ulster's victorious Heineken Cup campaign in 1998–99, plus four interpro and one representative starts; and one substitute appearance in the Heineken Cup, one in the Interpros, and one friendly start in 1999–2000.

Years	Team	Apps	Pts
1990–2000	Ulster	71	49

==== Lorcan McLoughlin ====
Born 3 March 2002. Height 1.89 m (6 ft 2 1/2 in), weight 109 kg (17.2 st; 240 lb). Back row. Irish-qualified through his father. Educated at Sherborne School in Dorset. Recruited to the IQ Rugby programme by Kevin Maggs, joining the Ulster sub-academy. 3 caps in Grand Slam-winning 2022 u20 6 Nations campaign, and 4 in the 2022 u20 Summer Series, leading the competition for carries. Studied business and economics at Queen's University, and was part of the Queen's side that won the Ulster Senior Cup in 2022. Joined the Ulster academy in 2022. Made his senior Ulster debut from the bench against the Lions in November 2023. Signed a development contract in 2024, upgraded to a senior contract the following season. Left at the end of the 2025-26 season. He then signed for Japanese club Yakult Levins Toda.

Years	Team	Apps	Pts
2021–2025	Queen's University	12	45
2025–	Instonians	2	4
2022	Ireland u-20	7	5
2023–26	Ulster	5	0
2026-	Yakult Levins Toda		

==== Bradley McNamara ====
Instonians fullback. Won Ulster Club Player of the Year in 2024. Appeared for Ulster 'A' in November 2025. Signed as short term injury cover in December 2025. Made his debut from the bench against Cardiff in the 2025-26 EPCR Challenge Cup. Won Ulster Club Player of the Year in 2026.

Years	Team	Apps	Pts
2024–	Instonians	29	105
2025	Ulster	1	0

Correct as of 7 March 2026

==== Matt Miles ====
Born 23 December 1981. Hooker. Represented Wales at under-21 level. Formerly played for Northampton and Pertemps Bees. Signed for Ulster 2007. Made one appearance from the bench against Ospreys in December 2007. Joined Cambridge in 2008.

Years	Team	Apps	Pts
2007–18	Ulster	3	0

==== Robin Morrow ====
Born 2 February 1974. Fullback, played for Queens and Dungannon. Started one representative match in 1995–96; all four Heineken Cup matches, all three interpros and one representative match in 1996–97; four Heineken Cup matches and three interpros in 1997–98; and made one representative substitute appearance in 1998–99.

Years	Team	Apps	Pts
1995–99	Ulster	17	0

==== Stephen Mulholland ====
Born 4 July 1990. Back row. Played for Ballymena, called up for Ulster in November and December 2015. Signed a development contract, but missed the rest of the season with injury. Played for Ulster A in the British and Irish Cup 2015–17.

Years	Team	Apps	Pts
2015–17	Ulster	2	0

=== N ===
Ian Nagle | Timoci Nagusa (Fiji) | Peter Nelson (Canada)

==== Russell Nelson ====
Born Newlands, Cape Town, 19 February 1973. Back row. Signed from the Bulls in 2000. Made 5 starts in the Heineken Cup; 6 starts, scoring 1 try, in the Interprovincial Championship; and 3 starts in friendlies in 2000–01. Made 12 starts, scoring 1 try, in 2001–02. 2 starts, and 2 substitute appearances in 2002–03. Moved to Padova in 2003. He died on 30 January 2026 in Cape Town.

Years	Team	Apps	Pts
2000–03	Ulster	30	10

=== O ===
Alan O'Connor | David O'Connor | Niall O'Connor | Dion O'Cuinneagain (Ireland) | Ed O'Donoghue | Stuart Olding (Ireland)

==== Shea O'Brien ====
Born 15 July 1999. Fullback, played for City of Armagh, with whom he won the Ulster Senior Cup in 2020. Named Club Player of the Year in the 2020 Ulster Rugby Awards. Signed a development contract with Ulster in 2022, while studying medicine at Queen's University. Graduated in 2023, signed a senior contract with Ulster, and made his senior debut from the bench against Connacht in December 2023. Released at the end of the 2023–24 season.

Years	Team	Apps	Pts
2023–24	Ulster	1	0

==== Bryan O'Connor ====
Prop. Born 23 October 1998, Crosshaven, Cork. Height 1.875 m (6 ft 2 in), weight 126 kg (19.8 st; 278 lb). Played for University College Cork and was part of the Munster sub-academy. Played for Munster A in the 2017–18 British and Irish Cup, and Ireland u-20 at the 2018 u-20 World Championship. Spent seven months at London Irish before returning UCC. Joined Gloucester in 2021, then Bedford Blues in 2023. Signed for Ulster in October 2024. Made his debut from the bench against Benetton in February 2025. He left Ulster at the end of the 2025-26 season.

Years	Team	Apps	Pts
2018	Ireland u-20	3	0
2018	London Irish		
2021–23	Gloucester	12	0
2023–24	Bedford Blues	22	5
2024–25	Queen's University	14	5
2024–26	Ulster	5	0

Correct as of 24 April 2026

==== Tommy O'Hagan ====
Prop, born 5 October 1993. Made his senior Ulster debut on 28 December 2018 in round 12 of the 2018–19 Pro14, featuring off the bench in the provinces 37–17 win against Scottish side Glasgow Warriors. He was released ahead of the 2020–21 season.

Years	Team	Apps	Pts
2018–20	Ulster	2	0

==== Ciaran O'Kane ====
Hooker, played for Portadown. Made one appearance from the bench in the 1997–98 Heineken Cup.

Years	Team	Apps	Pts
1997	Ulster	1	0

==== Jack Owens ====
Fullback/wing, born 4 October 1995. Made his senior Ulster debut on 18 February 2017 in round 15 of the 2016–17 Pro12, featuring off the bench in the provinces 37–17 win against Scottish side Glasgow Warriors.

Years	Team	Apps	Pts
2016–17	Ulster	2	0

=== P ===
Filo Paulo (Samoa) | Jared Payne (Ireland) | Ruan Pienaar (South Africa) | Charles Piutau (New Zealand) (Tonga) | Ian Porter

==== Andy Park ====
Born 30 September 1975. Wing/fullback, played for NIFC and Ballymena. Made one start in the Heineken Cup and three in the Interpros in 1995–96; two interpros and one friendly in 1997–98; made three substitute appearances in the pool stage and started the semi-final and final in the 1998–99 Heineken Cup campaign, and also started four interpros and 2 representative matches that season.

Years	Team	Apps	Pts
1995–99	Ulster	21	37

==== John Patterson ====
Born 5 August 1973. Back row forward, played for Dungannon. One appearance from the bench in the 1996–97 Heineken Cup.

Years	Team	Apps	Pts
1996–97	Ulster	2	0

==== Gavin Pfister ====
Back row. South African. Joined Worcester in 2001, spent two years there before joining Pertemps Bees. Signed for Ulster as injury cover in November 2004. Made 4 starts and 2 substitute appearances in 2004–05.

Years	Team	Apps	Pts
2004–05	Ulster	6	0

==== Stuart Philpott ====
Born 24 July 1985. Hooker. Represented Ireland at under-21 level. Joined the Ulster academy from Saracens 2005, signed a development contract 2006. Made his debut from the bench against Scarlets in March 2007. Made one appearance from the bench the following season, against Glasgow Warriors in November 2007. Made three appearances, all from the bench, in 2008–09. Released 2009. Went on to play for Nottingham and Henley.

Years	Team	Apps	Pts
2006–09	Ulster	6	0

==== David Pollock ====
Back row, born Omagh, 19 March 1987. Joined the Ulster academy in 2005. Captained Ireland Under-20s to a Six Nations grand slam in 2007, winning five caps. Joined the Ulster senor squad in 2007. Represented Ireland A five times, including against England Saxons on 1 February 2008, and in the Churchill Cup. Forced to retire from rugby at 23 due to a hip injury, having made 45 appearances for Ulster and scored three tries. He has since pursued a career in medicine.

Years	Team	Apps	Pts
2007–10	Ulster	45	15

=== R ===
Matty Rea | Marcus Rea | Sean Reffell | Jack Regan | Sean Reidy (Ireland) | Bradley Roberts (Wales) | Dave Ryan

==== Michael Rainey ====
Centre, played for Ballymena. Appeared for Ulster in a representative match against New Zealand Federation Under-23 in November 1995.

Years	Team	Apps	Pts
1995–96	Ulster	3	0

==== Murtagh Rea ====
Born 21 December 1967. Lock, played for Malone. Made one start in a representative match against Edinburgh District in December 1995. In 1997–98, he made 3 sub appearances in the Heineken Cup, and 1 sub appearance in a friendly. In the 1998–99 Heineken Cup-winning season he made 2 starts in the Heineken Cup, 5 starts in the interpros, and 3 starts in representative matches.

Years	Team	Apps	Pts
1995–99	Ulster	13	10

==== Stephen Ritchie ====
Born 5 January 1970. Hooker, played for Ballymena. Played 3 representative matches in 1995–96; all four Heineken Cup matches, all three Interpros, 1 representative match against Australia in 1996–97; and all six Heineken Cup matches, all three interpros and one friendly in 1997–98. Went on 1997 Ireland A tour of Oceania, and appeared once against North Aukland.

Years	Team	Apps	Pts
1995–98	Ulster	21	10

==== Daniel Roach ====
Prop. Son of Australian rugby league player Steve Roach. Australian schoolboy international, played for Australia under-19 against Ireland under-19 in 2005. Signed for Ulster from New South Wales Waratahs in 2008. Made one appearance from the bench against Glasgow Warriors in April 2009. Played for Monteux in 2009–10.

Years	Team	Apps	Pts
2008–09	Ulster	1	0

==== Alan Robinson ====
Lock, played for Ballymena. Started two matches in the Interprovincial Championship in 1996.

Years	Team	Apps	Pts
1996	Ulster	2	0

==== Bronson Ross ====
Born 16 September 1985. Tighthead prop. Born Oamaru, New Zealand. Irish-qualified through his Belfast-born mother. Played for Dunedin before moving to Europe at 22. Spent two seasons with Boroughmuir and one at Guernica. Joined Coventry in 2012 and played 26 times for them in the 2012–13 season. Signed a development contract with Ulster in 2013, and played for Ulster A in the British and Irish Cup 2013–16. Signed a senior contract in 2014. Made 20 senior appearances, including one start, in 2014–15, and 10 senior appearances, including one start, in 2015–16.

Years	Team	Apps	Pts
2013–16	Ulster	31	0

==== Clive Ross ====
Back row, born Cork, 14 June 1989. Educated at Midleton College. Played club rugby at De La Salle Palmerston (2008–12), then Lansdowne, with whom he won the All-Ireland League (2012–14). Joined Ulster in the summer of 2014. Made his debut in the 13–6 loss away to Zebre, on 27 September 2014. He is the cousin of Irish international Mike Ross. Released in 2020, having made 73 appearances and scored two tries.

Years	Team	Apps	Pts
2014–20	Ulster	73	10

=== S ===
Clinton Schifcofske | Rory Scholes | Matt Sexton | Tommy Seymour (Scotland) | David Shanahan | Paul Shields (Ireland) | Jamie Smith | Stephen Smyth | Henry Speight (Australia) | Nevin Spence | Michael Stanley (Samoa) | Paul Steinmetz (New Zealand) | Lewis Stevenson | Rory Sutherland (Scotland)

==== David Scott ====
Tighthead prop, played for NIFC. Represented Ulster in a representative match against Edinburgh District in December 1995.

Years	Team	Apps	Pts
1995	Ulster	1	0

==== Simon Shawe ====
Tighthead prop. Born 13 April 1979. Originally from Ballymoney, attended Coleraine Academical Institution. Played for Queen's University and Belfast Harlequins. Played for Celtic Warriors XV, a combined Ulster-Scottish Borders team, in a friendly against Ulster in December 2002. Made 2 substitute appearances for Ulster in 2003–04. Returned to club rugby with Ballymena, and was selected for the Ireland Clubs representative side. Signed for Leinster as injury cover in 2010–11, making 8 appearances, including 1 start, in the Pro12, and 2 substitute appearances in the Heineken Cup.

Years	Team	Apps	Pts
2003–04	Ulster	2	0
2010–11	Leinster	10	0

==== Jonny Shiels ====
Born 25 September 1989. Attended Coleraine Academical Institution, named Ulster schools player of the year in 2008. Joined the academy 2008. Made two substitute appearances in 2009–10.

Years	Team	Apps	Pts
2009–10	Ulster	2	0

==== Charlie Simpson ====
Lock, played for Dungannon. One start in the Interprovincial Championship and two in friendlies in 1996, and appeared off the bench in a friendly in 1997.

Years	Team	Apps	Pts
1996	Ulster	1	0

==== James Simpson ====
Lock/back row. Joined Ulster academy 2011, and made one senior appearance off the bench against Leinster in December 2011. Promoyed to senior squad 2014, played for Ulster A in the British and Irish Cup.

Years	Team	Apps	Pts
2011–12	Ulster	1	0

==== Jonny Simpson ====
Born 19 August 1990. Prop. Played for Ulster A in the British and Irish Cup 2015–18. Signed a development contract in 2016. Made his senior debut off the bench against Leinster in December 2016. Made three more senior appearances, including one start, in 2016–17 season.

Years	Team	Apps	Pts
2016–17	Ulster	4	0

==== Zac Solomon ====
Hooker. Attended Campbell College and played club rugby for Belfast Harlequins. Represented Ireland at under-18 schools and under-19 level. Played for Ulster A 2022. Joined the academy 2023. Made his Ulster debut from the bench away to Glasgow Warriors in November 2023. He left Ulster at the end of the 2024–25 season.

Years	Team	Apps	Pts
2023	Ulster	1	0

==== Reece Spee ====
Born 22 April 1978. Scrum half. Born in New Zealand, where he played for Bay of Plenty. Played club rugby in Ireland for City of Derry and Belfast Harlequins. Played for Celtic Warriors XV, a combined Ulster-Scottish Borders team, in a friendly against Ulster in December 2002. Offered a contract by Ulster in 2003. Made three substitute appearances in 2003–04, one substitute appearance in 2004–05, and one substitute appearance in 2005–06. Joined Pertemps Bees in 2006.

Years	Team	Apps	Pts
2003–06	Ulster	5	0

==== Jonny Stewart ====
Scrum-half, born Hillsborough, County Down. He attended Wallace High School, Lisburn, before joining the Ulster Academy in 2016. He made his full Ulster debut against Leinster in October 2017. In July 2019, Stewart graduated from the Queen's University of Belfast with an Upper Second Class Bachelor of Laws degree. In 2020, Stewart started his master's degree in Utrecht, while playing for, and captaining, the Utrechtse Studenten Rugby Society

Years	Team	Apps	Pts
2017–19	Ulster	14	15

==== Shane Stewart ====
Born 21 October 1976, New Zealand. Centre/wing. Played club rugby for Ballymena. Signed by Ulster in 2000. Made 1 start and 2 substitute appearance, scoring one try, in the Heineken Cup; 2 starts and three substitute appearances, scoring 1 try, in the Interprovincial Championship; and 3 starts, scoring 3 tries, in friendlies in the 2000–01 season. In 2001–02 he made 6 starts and 1 substitute appearance, scoring 1 try. Spent nearly a year out with a serious knee injury. In 2002–03 he made 8 starts and 2 substitute appearance, scoring 1 try. In 2003–04 he made 22 starts and 2 substitute appearances, scoring 4 tries. He made no appearances in 2004–05 and 2005–06. Joined Newport Gwent Dragons for one season in 2006.

Years	Team	Apps	Pts
2000–04	Ulster	47	40

=== T ===
Stefan Terblanche (South Africa) | Jeffery Toomaga-Allen (New Zealand) (Samoa) | James Topping (Ireland) | Kieran Treadwell (Ireland) | Andrew Trimble (Ireland) | Dan Tuohy (Ireland) | Davy Tweed (Ireland)

==== Frank Taggart ====
Back row. Played for Ireland u-20 2014–16. Selected for Emerging Ireland for Tbilisi Cup 2015. Signed from Ballymena 2015, no senior appearances.

Years	Team	Apps	Pts
2013–15	Emerging Ireland	2	0

==== Rory Telfer ====
Fullback/wing, born 29 August 2003. Educated at Coleraine Grammar School. Represented Ulster and Ireland at age-grade level. Joined the Ulster academy in 2022. Represented Ireland u-20 in the 2023 u-20 Six Nations and 2023 u-20 World Championships. Played club rugby for Queen's University, where he also studied. Made his senior debut for Ulster off the bench against Union Bordeaux Bègles in December 2024, and his first start against Connacht later the same month. He left Ulster at the end of the 2024–25 season.

Years	Team	Apps	Pts
2023	Ireland u-20	4	10
2024–25	Ulster	4	0

==== Derek Topping ====
Born 2 September 1970. Back row forward. Represented Ulster 1997–2001. Part of the 1999 Heineken Cup team. Brother of wing James Topping.

Years	Team	Apps	Pts
1997–2001	Ulster	20	0

=== V ===
Franco van der Merwe (South Africa) | Schalk van der Merwe | Clinton van Rensburg | Joeli Veitayaki (Fiji) | Duane Vermeulen (South Africa)

=== W ===
Paddy Wallace (Ireland) | Pedrie Wannenburg (South Africa) | Andy Ward (Ireland) | Andrew Warwick | Grant Webb | Ian Whitten (Ireland) | Colin Wilkinson (Ireland) | Nick Williams | Cillian Willis | Roger Wilson (Ireland) | Sam Windsor

==== Neil Walsh ====
Born in Bahrain to Irish parents, 25 June 1985. Wing. Spent part of his childhood in New Zealand and the USA, and returned to Ireland in his teens. Played for CBC Monkstown, winning the Leinster Schools Vinnie Murray Cup. Studied at UCD while playing rugby for Lansdowne. Moved to Australia after graduating, and joined Melbourne Rugby Club, where the coach thought he had a chance to go professional, but an opportunity with a club in the English Championship fell through. Spent some time hiking in South America, where he received an offer of a trial for Ulster as injury cover. Joined the team in December 2012. Made one start and one substitute appearance in the Pro12 that season, but a shoulder injury meant Ulster did not offer him a permanent contract. He returned to Melbourne for a while, before joining Ourense in the Spanish third division, then a second division team near Barcelona, and finally a team in Lucerne, Switzerland.

Years	Team	Apps	Pts
2012–13	Ulster	2	0

==== Richard Weir ====
Born 7 May 1975. Hooker, played for Queens. Appeared for Ulster in a friendly against Ballymena in 1995. Was part of the 1998–99 Heineken Cup-winning team, making 1 start and 3 appearances off the bench, as well as one substitute appearance in the Interprovincial Championship, and one start and one substitute appearance in representative matches that season. In 1999–2000 he had 3 starts and 1 sub in the Heineken Cup, 1 start and 2 subs in the Interpros, and one friendly start against an Ireland XV. In 2000–01 he made 4 starts and one sub appearance in the Heineken Cup, started all 6 Interpros, and two appearances from the bench in friendlies. In 2001–02 he made three sub appearances in the Celtic League, and one start and one sub in friendlies.

Years	Team	Apps	Pts
1995–2002	Ulster	29	0

==== Alan Whitten ====
Born 12 June 1989. Prop. Brother of Ian Whitten. Played for Instonians. Joined Ulster as short-term injury cover in September 2010. Made one appearance off the bench against Aironi in October 2010.

Years	Team	Apps	Pts
2010–11	Ulster	1	0

==== Roger Wilson ====
Born 5 May 1972. Back row forward, played for Instonians. Made one representative start in 1993; started two interpros and two representative matches in 1994–95; one substitute appearance in the Heineken Cup, two representative and one friendly start in 1995–96; and two interpro starts and one friendly substitute appearance in 1997–98. Now a surgeon. Not the same Roger Wilson who played for Ulster 2003–2007 and 2012–2017.

Years	Team	Apps	Pts
1992–98	Ulster	14	5

=== Y ===
Bryan Young (Ireland)

==== Scott Young ====
Born 27 July 1981 Fullback/wing. Represented Ireland at under-21 level. Joined IRFU academy from Ballymena in 2001, and trained with the Ulster squad. Made two appearances from the bench in 2001–02 season. 5 starts, 3 substitute appearances in 2002–03. 17 starts, 3 substitute appearances in 2003–04. 6 starts, 3 substitute appearances in 2004–05. 20 starts, 3 substitute appearances in 2007-07. Moved to Doncaster Knights in 2007.

Years	Team	Apps	Pts
2002–07	Ulster	44	25
