= 1996–97 Ulster Rugby season =

Provincial professional playing season

- Ground: Ravenhill Stadium (Capacity: 12,500)
- Coach: Tony Russ
- Captain: Denis McBride
- Top scorer: Stuart Laing (59)
- Most tries: Stuart Duncan (3); James Topping (3)
- League(s): Heineken Cup (4th in pool); IRFU Interprovincial Championship (3rd of 4)
Team kit

The 1996–97 Ulster Rugby season was Ulster's second season under professionalism, during which they competed in the IRFU Interprovincial Championship and the Heineken Cup.

In June 1996, Ulster hired former Leicester Tigers coach Tony Russ on a five-year contract as their Director of Rugby. He would coach the Ulster senior team, organise strategy, and help develop the game from schools to senior level, working closely with IRFU Director of Rugby Ray Southam.

At this stage the Irish provinces were still representative teams, not professional clubs. However, Ulster were now offering contracts and match fees for Heineken Cup and Interprovincial matches, although these contracts sometimes conflicted with players contracted to clubs in England. English clubs were prepared to release their Irish players for the Heineken Cup, but not for the Interprovincial Championship, but clubs in England and Wales were unhappy at having to compete against representative teams from Ireland in the Heineken Cup. Out-half David Humphreys and lock Jeremy Davidson defied their club, London Irish, by competing in the Heineken Cup for Ulster, but were unavailable for Ulster's match against Australia as it clashed with London Irish's league match against Wasps. In Humphreys' absence, Ulster called on former Scotland "A" international Stuart Laing.

Ulster finished third in the Interprovincial Championship, and fourth in their pool in the Heineken Cup. In November, Russ quit to join English second division club Waterloo F.C., unhappy that after eight games, he would not be able to work with his Ulster players again for six months. Clive Griffiths was lined up to take over, but withdrew for family reasons. Davy Haslett, a geography teacher at Royal Belfast Academical Institution and assistant coach on the 1997 Ireland A rugby union tour of Oceania, was named as coach for the 1997–98 season in June.

Ulster players selected for Ireland for the 1997 Five Nations Championship were: Jonny Bell, Allen Clarke, Jeremy Davidson, Maurice Field, David Humphreys, Paddy Johns, Denis McBride and James Topping. Jeremy Davidson was selected for the 1997 British Lions tour to South Africa.

Ulster Women finished second in the inaugural Women's Interprovincial Series, losing to Connacht in the final. Rachel Reid, Joy Sparkes and Deborah Campbell made their debuts for Ireland.

== Players selected ==
Ulster Rugby squad
**Props**: (Ireland) Richard Mackey, Malone; (Ireland) Gary Leslie, Dungannon; (Ireland) Clem Boyd, Currie; **Hookers**: (Ireland) Stephen Ritchie, Ballymena; **Locks**: (Ireland) **Paddy Johns**, Saracens; (Ireland) **Jeremy Davidson**, London Irish; (Ireland) **Gary Longwell**, Ballymena; (Ireland) Alan Robinson, Ballymena; (Ireland) Charlie Simpson, Dungannon	**Back row**: (Ireland) Stuart Duncan, Malone; (Ireland) **Denis McBride**, Malone; (Ireland) Stephen McKinty, Bangor; (Ireland) John Patterson, Dungannon; **Scrum-halves**: (Ireland) Andrew Matchett, Ballymena; (Ireland) Stephen Bell, Dungannon; (Ireland) Kenton Hillman, Instonians; **Fly-halves**: (Ireland) **David Humphreys**, London Irish; (Scotland) Stuart Laing, Portadown	**Centres**: (Ireland) Sheldon Coulter, Ballymena; (Ireland) **Maurice Field**, Malone; (Ireland) **Mark McCall**, Dungannon; **Wings**: (Ireland) Jan Cunningham, TCD; (Ireland) James Topping, Ballymena; (Ireland) Neil McCluskey, QUB; **Fullbacks**: (Ireland) Robin Morrow, QUB
(c) denotes the team captain, **Bold** denotes internationally capped players.^{*} denotes players qualified to play for Ireland on residency or dual nationality.

== Season record ==
Competition	Played	Won	Drawn	Lost	PF	PA	PD	TF	TA
1996-97 Heineken Cup	4	1	0	3	75	87	-12	6	10
IRFU Interprovincial Championship	3	1	0	2	81	89	-8	8	8
Representative	1	0	0	1	26	39	-13	2	4
Total	8	2	0	6	182	215	-33	16	22

== 1996–97 Heineken Cup ==
=== Pool 3 ===
Team	P	W	D	L	Tries for	Tries against	Try diff	Points for	Points against	Points diff	Pts
(France) Brive	4	4	0	0	13	8	5	106	65	41	8
(England) Harlequins	4	3	0	1	20	8	12	131	95	36	6
(Wales) Neath	4	2	0	2	10	16	–6	83	109	–26	4
(Ireland) Ulster	4	1	0	3	6	10	–4	75	87	–12	2
(Scotland) Caledonia	4	0	0	4	13	20	–7	117	156	–39	0

13 October 1996	Caledonia (Scotland)	34-41	(Ireland) Ulster	McDiarmid Park, Perth
14:30	Try: Shepherd; Rouse; Grimes; Con: Shepherd (2); Pen: Shepherd (4); Drop: Newton	Report; Match centre	Try: Humphreys (2); Cunningham (2); McKinty; Con: Humphreys (2); Pen: Humphreys (2); Laing; Drop: Humphreys	Attendance: 2,400; Referee: J. C. Gastou
Ulster lineup: 1. Richard Mackey, 2. Stephen Ritchie, 3. Gary Leslie, 4. Paddy Johns, 5. Jeremy Davidson, 6. Stuart Duncan, 7. Denis McBride (c), 8. Stephen McKinty, 9. Stephen Bell, 10. David Humphreys, 11. Jan Cunningham, 12. Sheldon Coulter, 13. Maurice Field, 14. James Topping, 15. Robin Morrow.; Replacements: Neil McCluskey, for Coulter, 30 mins), Stuart Laing (for Field, 73 mins)				Attendance: 2,400; Referee: J. C. Gastou

16 October 1996	Ulster (Ireland)	15–21	(England) Harlequins	Ravenhill, Belfast
19:00	Pen: Humphreys (4); Drop: Humphreys	Report; Match centre	Try: Watson; O'Leary; Con: Carling; Pen: Carling (2)	Attendance: 8,000; Referee: I. Ramage
Ulster lineup: 1. Richard Mackey, 2. Stephen Ritchie, 3. Gary Leslie, 4. Paddy Johns, 5. Jeremy Davidson, 6. Stuart Duncan, 7. Denis McBride (c), 8. Stephen McKinty, 9. Andrew Matchett, 10. David Humphreys, 11. Jan Cunningham, 12. James Topping, 13. Sheldon Coulter, 14. Neil McCluskey, 15. Robin Morrow.; Replacements: John Patterson (for McBride).				Attendance: 8,000; Referee: I. Ramage

26 October 1996	Neath (Wales)	15–13	(Ireland) Ulster	The Gnoll, Neath
14:30	Try: Williams; Gerrard; Con: Davies; Pen: Davies	Report; Match centre	Try: Matchett; Con: Humphreys; Pen: Humphreys (2)	Attendance: 2,000
Ulster lineup: 1. Richard Mackey, 2. Stephen Ritchie, 3. Gary Leslie, 4. Gary Longwell, 5. Jeremy Davidson, 6. Stuart Duncan, 7. Denis McBride (c), 8. Stephen McKinty, 9. Andrew Matchett, 10. David Humphreys, 11. Jan Cunningham, 12. Maurice Field, 13. Mark McCall, 14. James Topping, 15. Robin Morrow.				Attendance: 2,000

2 November 1996	Ulster (Ireland)	6–17	(France) Brive	Ravenhill, Belfast
14:30	Pen: Humphreys; Drop: Humphreys	Report; Match centre Highlights	Try: Duboisset; Carrat; Viars; Con: Venditti	Attendance: 3,500; Referee: H. Lewis
Ulster lineup: 1. Richard Mackey, 2. Stephen Ritchie, 3. Gary Leslie, 4. Paddy Johns, 5. Jeremy Davidson, 6. Stuart Duncan, 7. Denis McBride (c), 8. Stephen McKinty, 9. Andrew Matchett, 10. David Humphreys, 11. Jan Cunningham, 12. Maurice Field, 13. Mark McCall, 14. James Topping, 15. Robin Morrow.; Replacement: John Patterson.				Attendance: 3,500; Referee: H. Lewis

== 1996–97 IRFU Interprovincial Championship ==
Team	P	W	D	L	F	A	BP	Pts	Status
Munster	3	3	0	0	117	92	-	12	Champions; qualified for 1997–98 Heineken Cup
Leinster	3	1	0	2	88	92	-	4	Qualified for 1997–98 Heineken Cup
Ulster	3	1	0	2	81	89	-	4	Qualified for 1997–98 Heineken Cup
Connacht	3	1	0	2	77	90	-	4	Qualified for 1997–98 European Challenge Cup

Top three teams qualify for next season's Heineken Cup.

21 September 1996	Ulster	25-35	Leinster	Ravenhill, Belfast
	Try: Ritchie; Duncan; Topping; Con: Laing (2); Pen: Laing (2)	Preview; Report	Try: McKenna (2); Jameson; Spicer; Con: Governey (3); Pen: Governey (3)	Referee: L. Mayne
Ulster lineup: 1. Richard Mackey, 2. Stephen Ritchie, 3. Clem Boyd, 4. Gary Longwell, 5. Charlie Simpson, 6. Stuart Duncan, 7. Denis McBride (c), 8. Stephen McKinty, 9. Stephen Bell, 10. Stuart Laing, 11. Jan Cunningham, 12. Mark McCall, 13. Maurice Field, 14. James Topping, 15. Robin Morrow.				Referee: L. Mayne

28 September 1996	Ulster	32-27	Connacht	Ravenhill, Belfast
	Try: Duncan; Laing; Topping; Con: Laing; Pen: Laing (5)	Report	Try: Carey; Elwood; Con: Elwood; Pen: Elwood (5); Drop: Elwood	Referee: B. Smith
Ulster lineup: 1. Richard Mackey, 2. Stephen Ritchie, 3. Clem Boyd, 4. Gary Longwell, 5. Alan Robinson, 6. Stuart Duncan, 7. Denis McBride (c), 8. Stephen McKinty, 9. Stephen Bell, 10. Stuart Laing, 11. Jan Cunningham, 12. Mark McCall, 13. Maurice Field, 14. James Topping, 15. Robin Morrow.				Referee: B. Smith

5 October 1996	Munster	27-24	Ulster	Thomond Park, Limerick
	Try: Dineen; Galwey; Con: Begley; Pen: Begley (3); Drop: McIvor; Keene	Report	Try: Duncan; Coulter; Con: Laing; Pen: Laing (4)	Referee: A. Lewis
Ulster lineup: 1. Richard Mackey, 2. Stephen Ritchie, 3. Clem Boyd, 4. Gary Longwell, 5. Alan Robinson, 6. Stuart Duncan, 7. Denis McBride (c), 8. Stephen McKinty, 9. Stephen Bell, 10. Stuart Laing, 11. Jan Cunningham, 12. Sheldon Coulter, 13. Mark McCall, 14. James Topping, 15. Robin Morrow.				Referee: A. Lewis

== Home attendance ==
Domestic League					European Cup					Total	
League	Fixtures	Average Attendance	Highest	Lowest	League	Fixtures	Average Attendance	Highest	Lowest	Total Attendance	Average Attendance
–	–	–	–	–	1996–97 Heineken Cup	2	5,750	8,000	3,500	11,500	5,750

== Representative matches ==
16 November 1996	Ulster (Ireland)	26-39	Australia	Ravenhill, Belfast
	Try: Topping; Penalty try Con: Laing (2); Pen: Laing (2)	Report	Try: Eales; Roff; Campese; Penalty try Con: Burke; Pen: Burke; Knox	Referee: K. Macartney
Ulster lineup: 1. Richard Mackey, 2. Stephen Ritchie, 3. Gary Leslie, 4. Gary Longwell, 5. Paddy Johns, 6. Stuart Duncan, 7. Denis McBride (c), 8. Stephen McKinty, 9. Andrew Matchett, 10. Stuart Laing, 11. Jan Cunningham, 12. Mark McCall, 13. Maurice Field, 14. James Topping, 15. Robin Morrow.				Referee: K. Macartney

== Friendlies ==
24 August 1996	Ulster (Ireland)	17-43	(England) London Irish	Ravenhill, Belfast
	Try: Ritchie; Hillman; Field; Con: Coulter	Report	Try: Humphreys; Newington; Flood; Woods; Bishop (2); Richardson; Con: Humphreys (5)

3 September 1996	Ballymena (Ireland)	5-20	(Ireland) Ulster	Eaton Park, Ballymena
	Try: Beattie	Report	Try: Longwell; Ritchie; Matchett; Con: Laing; Pen: Laing
Ulster lineup: 1. Richard Mackey, 2. Stephen Ritchie, 3. Gary Leslie, 4. Charlie Simpson, 5. Gary Longwell, 6. John Patterson, 7. Denis McBride (c), 8. Stephen McKinty, 9. Andrew Matchett, 10. Stuart Laing, 11. Jan Cunningham, 12. Sheldon Coulter, 13. Maurice Field, 14. James Topping, 15. Stan McDowell.; Replacement: Tony McWhirter (for McKinty).

6 September 1996	Dungannon (Ireland)	17-47	(Ireland) Ulster	Stevenson Park, Dungannon
	Try: Sandford; McCaughey; Dunn; Con: Blair	Report	Try: McDowell; McKinty (2); Topping (2); Longwell; McWhirter; Con: Laing (6)
Ulster lineup: 1. Richard Mackey, 2. Stephen Ritchie, 3. Gary Leslie, 4. K. Gallagher, 5. Charlie Simpson, 6. John Patterson, 7. Stephen McKinty, 8. Tony McWhirter, 9. Neil Doak, 10. Stuart Laing, 11. Jan Cunningham, 12. Sheldon Coulter, 13. Maurice Field, 14. James Topping, 15. Stan McDowell.

== Ulster Women ==
The inaugural Women's Interprovincial Series was held at Ashbourne RFC in September 1996. Ulster beat Leinster 12-0 in the semi-final, but lost 35-0 to Connacht in the final.
