= 1997–98 Ulster Rugby season =

Professional provincial Rugby Union playing season

- Ground: Ravenhill Stadium (Capacity: 12,500)
- Coach: Davy Haslett
- Captain: Stephen McKinty
- Top scorer: Stuart Laing (115)
- Most tries: Jan Cunningham (2); Stan McDowell (2)
- League(s): Heineken Cup (4th in pool); IRFU Interprovincial Championship (3rd of 4)
Team kit

The 1997–98 season was Ulster Rugby's third season under professionalism, during which they competed in the Heineken Cup and the IRFU Interprovincial Championship. Ulster Rugby Limited was incorporated as a private company limited by guarantee on 9 May 1997.

The IRFU offered new contracts for provincial players for this season. Full-time players would receive a retainer of £25,000, plus a win bonus of £500 for Heineken Cup matches. Part-time players would be paid a retainer of £7,500, plus a match fee of £400 for Interprovincial matches and £800 for the Heineken Cup, and a win bonus of £450 for both competitions. Each province could have a maximum of 30 contracted players.

Mark McCall was offered a full-time contract, but turned it down and signed for London Irish, making him unavailable for Ulster this season. Full-time contracts were also offered to Jan Cunningham and Stephen Bell, and part-time contracts to Sheldon Coulter, Gary Longwell, Andrew Matchett, Dean Macartney and Tony McWhirter (Ballymena), Stuart Duncan, Richard Mackey and Denis McBride (Malone), Gary Leslie and John Patterson (Dungannon), Clem Boyd (Bedford), Bryn Cunningham (Bective), Stuart Laing (Portadown), Stephen McKinty (Bangor), and Andy Ward (Ballynahinch).

After the departure of Tony Russ, Clive Griffiths was lined up to take over as head coach, but withdrew in the summer. Davy Haslett, a geography teacher at RBAI, was offered the position on the eve of the 1997 Ireland A rugby union tour of Oceania, on which he was assistant coach. Between returning from that tour and a pre-booked famility holiday, he only had four weeks to work with the team before the season started. Charlie McAleese was appointed assistant coach, and John Kinnear team manager. Ulster finished third in the Interprovincial Championship, and bottom of their pool in the Heineken Cup.

A representative match against South African side Geuteng Falcons in early 1998, for which Ulster were to be coached by Ballymena coach Nelie Smith, was called off after clubs refused to release their players.

Paddy Johns and Andy Ward were selected for the Ireland squad for the 1998 Five Nations Championship. Johns, Ward and James Topping were selected for the 1998 tour to South Africa.

Ulster Women finished bottom in the Women's Interprovincial Series, which was won by Rugby for the second time running. Fiona Neary, Maura Coulter and Suzanne Fleming made their debuts for Ireland.

== Players selected ==
Ulster Rugby squad
**Props**: (Ireland) Richard Mackey, Malone; (Ireland) Gary Leslie, Dungannon; (Ireland) Rab Irwin, Ballymena; **Hookers**: (Ireland) Stephen Ritchie, Ballymena; (Ireland) Ciaran O'Kane (Portadown); (Ireland) Michael Patton (Dungannon); **Locks**: (Ireland) Tony McWhirter, Ballymena; (Ireland) **Gary Longwell**, Ballymena; (Ireland) Murtagh Rea, Malone; (Ireland) Charlie Simpson, Dungannon	**Back row**: (Ireland) Stephen McKinty, Bangor; (Ireland) Keith Gallick, City of Derry; (New Zealand) Andy Ward, Ballynahinch*; (Ireland) Roger Wilson, Instonians; (Ireland) Stuart Duncan, Malone; (Ireland) Kevin McKee, Instonians; (Ireland) Dean Macartney, Ballymena; **Scrum-halves**: (Ireland) Andrew Matchett, Ballymena; (Ireland) Stephen Bell, Dungannon; (Ireland) Kenton Hillman, Instonians; **Fly-halves**: (Scotland) Stuart Laing, Portadown; (Ireland) Bryn Cunningham, Bective	**Centres**: (Ireland) **Maurice Field**, Malone; (Ireland) Stan McDowell, Ballymena; (Ireland) Michael Jackson, Blackrock; **Wings**: (Ireland) **James Topping**, Ballymena; (Ireland) Sheldon Coulter, Ballymena; (Ireland) Jan Cunningham, TCD; (Ireland) Andy Park, Ballymena; (Ireland) Graeme McCluskey, Portadown; (Ireland) Scott Carroll, Malone; **Fullbacks**: (Ireland) Robin Morrow, Dungannon; (Ireland) Ross Collins, Collegians
(c) denotes the team captain, **Bold** denotes internationally capped players.^{*} denotes players qualified to play for Ireland on residency or dual nationality.

== Season record ==
Competition	Played	Won	Drawn	Lost	PF	PA	PD	TF	TA
1997-98 Heineken Cup	6	1	0	5	95	195	-100	6	23
IRFU Interprovincial Championship	3	1	0	2	59	65	-6	4	6
Total	9	2	0	7	154	260	-106	10	29

== 1997–98 Heineken Cup ==
=== Pool 2 ===
Team	P	W	D	L	Tries for	Tries against	Try diff	Points for	Points against	Points diff	Pts
(England) Wasps	6	6	0	0	31	12	19	243	104	139	12
(Scotland) Glasgow	6	3	0	3	14	15	−1	132	167	−35	6
(Wales) Swansea	6	2	0	4	15	16	−1	157	161	−4	4
(Ireland) Ulster	6	1	0	5	6	23	−17	95	195	−100	2

8 September 1997	Ulster (Ireland)	12 – 18	(Scotland) Glasgow	Ravenhill, Belfast
19:00	Pen: Laing (3); Drop: Laing	Report; Match centre	Try: Craig; Wallace; Con: Hayes; Pen: Hayes (2)	Attendance: 2,100
Ulster lineup: 1. Richard Mackey, 2. Stephen Ritchie, 3. Gary Leslie, 4. Tony McWhirter, 5. Gary Longwell, 6. Stephen McKinty, 7. Keith Gallick, 8. Andy Ward, 9. Stephen Bell, 10. Stuart Laing, 11. Sheldon Coulter, 12. James Topping, 13. Maurice Field, 14. Jan Cunningham, 15. Robin Morrow.; Replacement: Roger Wilson				Attendance: 2,100

13 September 1997	Swansea (Wales)	33 – 16	(Ireland) Ulster	St. Helen's, Swansea
14:00	Try: Gibbs; H. Thomas; Con: A. Thomas; Pen: A. Thomas (7)	Report; Match centre	Try: Gallick; Con: Laing; Pen: Laing (3)	Attendance: 3,000; Referee: K. McCartney
Ulster lineup: 1. Richard Mackey, 2. Stephen Ritchie, 3. Gary Leslie, 4. Tony McWhirter, 5. Gary Longwell, 6. Stephen McKinty, 7. Keith Gallick, 8. Andy Ward, 9. Stephen Bell, 10. Stuart Laing, 11. Sheldon Coulter, 12. James Topping, 13. Maurice Field, 14. Jan Cunningham, 15. Robin Morrow.; Replacements: Andy Park, Michael Patton				Attendance: 3,000; Referee: K. McCartney

21 September 1997	London Wasps (England)	56 – 3	(Ireland) Ulster	Loftus Road Stadium, London
15:00	Try: Mitchell; Wood; King; Logan (3); Greenstock; Rosier; Con: Rees (5); Pen: Rees	Report; Match centre	Pen: Laing	Attendance: 4,120
Ulster lineup: 1. Richard Mackey, 2. Stephen Ritchie, 3. Rab Irwin, 4. Tony McWhirter, 5. Gary Longwell, 6. Stephen McKinty, 7. Keith Gallick, 8. Andy Ward, 9. Andrew Matchett, 10. Stuart Laing, 11. Jan Cunningham, 12. Maurice Field, 13. Stan McDowell, 14. James Topping, 15. Robin Morrow.; Replacements: Ciaran O'Kane (for Ritchie, 12–24), Roger Wilson (for Gallick, 63), Murtagh Rea (for Longwell, 12–16; for McWhirter, 74), Bryn Cunningham (for Laing, 70), Stephen Bell (for Field, 75)				Attendance: 4,120

27 September 1997	Ulster (Ireland)	28 – 20	(Wales) Swansea	Ravenhill, Belfast
14:30	Try: Penalty try Jackson; McWhirter; Con: Laing (2); Pen: Laing (3)	Report; Match centre	Try: Rees (2); Williams; Con: Williams; Pen: Williams	Attendance: 2,500; Referee: George Hughes
Ulster lineup: 1. Rab Irwin, 2. Stephen Ritchie, 3. Gary Leslie, 4. Tony McWhirter, 5. Gary Longwell, 6. Stephen McKinty, 7. Keith Gallick, 8. Andy Ward, 9. Andrew Matchett, 10. Stuart Laing, 11. Jan Cunningham, 12. Maurice Field, 13. Michael Jackson, 14. James Topping, 15. Robin Morrow.; Replacements: Andy Park, Roger Wilson.				Attendance: 2,500; Referee: George Hughes

3 October 1997	Ulster (Ireland)	21 – 38	(England) London Wasps	Ravenhill, Belfast
19:30	Try: Jan Cunningham (2); Con: Laing; Pen: Laing (3)	Report; Match centre	Try: Henderson; Rosier; White; Greenstock; Dallaglio; Con: Rees (5); Pen: Rees	Attendance: 3,250
Ulster lineup: 1. Gary Lesie, 2. Stephen Ritchie, 3. Rab Irwin, 4. Tony McWhirter, 5. Gary Longwell, 6. Stephen McKinty, 7. Keith Gallick, 8. Andy Ward, 9. Andrew Matchett, 10. Stuart Laing, 11. Jan Cunningham, 12. Maurice Field, 13. Michael Jackson, 14. James Topping, 15. Stan McDowell.; Replacements: Murtagh Rea (for McWhirter, 60), Roger Wilson (for Gallick, 60), Andy Park				Attendance: 3,250

12 October 1997	Glasgow (Scotland)	30 – 15	(Ireland) Ulster	Scotstoun Stadium, Glasgow
15:00	Try: Penalty try Stott; Hayes; Con: Hayes (3); Pen: Hayes (3)	Report; Match centre	Pen: Laing (5)	Attendance: 4,000
Ulster lineup: 1. Gary Lesie, 2. Stephen Ritchie, 3. Rab Irwin, 4. Tony McWhirter, 5. Gary Longwell, 6. Stephen McKinty, 7. Keith Gallick, 8. Andy Ward, 9. Andrew Matchett, 10. Stuart Laing, 11. Jan Cunningham, 12. Maurice Field, 13. Michael Jackson, 14. James Topping, 15. Stan McDowell.; Replacements: Roger Wilson (for Gallick, 56), Murtagh Rea (for McWhirter, 64).				Attendance: 4,000

== 1997–98 IRFU Interprovincial Championship ==
Team	P	W	D	L	F	A	BP	Pts	Status
Leinster	3	2	0	1	61	46	-	8	Champions; qualified for 1998–99 Heineken Cup
Munster	3	2	0	1	56	43	-	8	Qualified for 1998–99 Heineken Cup
Ulster	3	1	0	2	59	65	-	4	Qualified for 1998–99 Heineken Cup
Connacht	3	1	0	2	42	64	-	4	Qualified for 1998–99 European Challenge Cup

16 August 1997	Leinster	26-25	Ulster	Donnybrook, Dublin
	Try: Rolland; Hickie; O'Mahony; Con: Rolland; Pen: Governey (3)	Report	Try: Laing; Con: Laing; Pen: Laing (6)	Referee: David McHugh
Ulster lineup: 1. Richard Mackey, 2. Stephen Ritchie, 3. Gary Leslie, 4. Tony McWhirter, 5. Gary Longwell, 6. Roger Wilson, 7. Stephen McKinty, 8. Andy Ward, 9. Kenton Hillman, 10. Stuart Laing, 11. Graeme McCluskey, 12. Stan McDowell, 13. Sheldon Coulter, 14. Jan Cunningham, 15. Robin Morrow.; Replacements: Rab Irwin (for Leslie).				Referee: David McHugh

23 August 1997	Connacht	27-17	Ulster	The Sportsground, Galway
	Try: McEntee; Murphy; Charlie; Con: Elwood (3); Pen: Elwood (2)	Report	Try: McDowell (2); Con: Laing (2); Pen: Laing	Referee: L. Mayne
Ulster lineup: 1. Richard Mackey, 2. Stephen Ritchie, 3. Gary Leslie, 4. Tony McWhirter, 5. Gary Longwell, 6. Stephen McKinty, 7. Roger Wilson, 8. Andy Ward, 9. Stephen Bell, 10. Stuart Laing, 11. Jan Cunningham, 12. Stan McDowell, 13. Sheldon Coulter, 14. Andy Park, 15. Robin Morrow.				Referee: L. Mayne

30 August 1997	Ulster	22-12	Munster	Ravenhill, Belfast
	Try: Park; Con: Laing; Pen: Laing (4); Drop: Laing	Report	Pen: O'Gara (4)	Referee: M. White
Ulster lineup: 1. Richard Mackey, 2. Stephen Ritchie, 3. Gary Leslie, 4. Tony McWhirter, 5. Gary Longwell, 6. Stephen McKinty, 7. Keith Gallick, 8. Andy Ward, 9. Stephen Bell, 10. Stuart Laing, 11. Sheldon Coulter, 12. Maurice Field, 13. Jan Cunningham, 14. Andy Park, 15. Robin Morrow.				Referee: M. White

== Home attendance ==
Domestic League					European Cup					Total	
League	Fixtures	Average Attendance	Highest	Lowest	League	Fixtures	Average Attendance	Highest	Lowest	Total Attendance	Average Attendance
–	–	–	–	–	1997–98 Heineken Cup	3	2,617	3,250	2,100	7,850	2,617

== Friendlies ==
9 August 1997	Ulster (Ireland)	19-41	(England) Richmond	Palace Grounds, Armagh
	Try: Mackey; Coulter; Irwin; Con: Laing (2)	Report	Try: Chapman (3); Pini (2); Wright; Quinnell; Con: Pini (2)	Referee: M. White
Ulster lineup: 1. Richard Mackey, 2. Stephen Ritchie, 3. Gary Leslie, 4. Tony McWhirter, 5. Gary Longwell, 6. Stuart Duncan, 7. Stephen McKinty, 8. Andy Ward, 9. Stephen Bell, 10. Stuart Laing, 11. Scott Carroll, 12. Sheldon Coulter, 13. Michael Jackson, 14. Andy Park, 15. Jan Cunningham.; Replacements: Murtagh Rea, Kevin McKee, Rab Irwin, Dean Macartney, Roger Wilson, Kenton Hillman, Michael Patton, Charlie Simpson, Bryn Cunningham, Ross Collins.				Referee: M. White

== Ulster Rugby Awards ==
The inaugural Guinness Ulster Rugby Awards dinner was held on 20 May 1998 at the Balmoral Conference Centre. Winners were:

- Player of the year: Andy Ward
- Personality of the year: Andy Ward
- Club of the year: Ballynahinch RFC
- Coach of the year: Charlie McAleese, Dromore High School
- Youth player of the year: Diarmuid O'Kane, St Colman's College, Newry
- Schools player of the year: Andy Hughes, Royal School Dungannon
- Dorrington B. Faulkner Memorial Award: Ken Reid, former IRFU president and Ireland team manager

== Ulster women ==
The second Women's Interprovincial Series was held in Galway in October 1997. Five teams took part - Ulster, Munster, Leinster, Connacht and an Irish Exiles team. The competition was held on a league basis over two days, with each team playing two games of twenty minutes a side each day. Connacht won the series for the second season in a row, with Ulster finishing last.
