= Henry O'Kane =

Ireland international rugby league footballer

Personal information
- Born: 5 April 2002 (age 24) Sydney, New South Wales, Australia
- Height: 6 ft 3 in (1.91 m)
- Weight: 15 st 10 lb (100 kg)

Playing information
- Position: Second-row, Loose forward
Club
Years	Team	Pld	T	G	FG	P
2026–	Toulouse Olympique	3	1	0	0	4
Representative
Years	Team	Pld	T	G	FG	P
2022–	Ireland	1	0	0	0	0
- Source: As of 4 May 2026
- Father: Kevin O'Kane

Henry O'Kane (born 5 April 2002) is an Ireland international rugby league footballer who plays as a second-row forward for Toulouse Olympique in the Super League

He was previously contracted to the Wests Tigers in the National Rugby League (NRL).

== Background ==
O’Kane was born in Sydney, New South Wales, Australia. He is of Irish descent. He is the son of former New South Wales Waratahs hooker Kevin O'Kane.

== Playing career ==
O’Kane played for the Balmain Tigers.

He played for the Western Suburbs Magpies and Newtown Jets in the 2022 NSW Cup.

=== Toulouse Olympique ===
On 11 December 2025 it was reported that he had signed for Toulouse Olympique in the Super League on a 1-year deal.

=== International career ===
In 2022 O’Kane was named in the Ireland squad for the 2021 Rugby League World Cup.
