= Tim Wallace (rugby union) =

- Born: 29 March 1969 (age 57) Sydney, Australia

Rugby union career
- Position: Fly-half
Provincial / State sides
Years	Team	Apps	(Points)
1993–96	New South Wales Waratahs		
International career
Years	Team	Apps	(Points)
1994	Australia	2	(20)

Timothy (Tim) Mark Wallace (born 29 March 1969, in Sydney) is a former rugby union player who played with the Australian national team and NSW Waratahs.

Wallace played two tests for Australia as fly half against Italy in 1994, scoring 20 points.
