= Kevin O'Kane =

Australian rugby union player

- Born: Adaminaby, New South Wales, Australia
- School: St Joseph's College
- Notable relative: Henry O'Kane (son)

Rugby union career
- Position: Hooker
Super Rugby
Years	Team	Apps	(Points)
1996	Waratahs	7	(5)

Kevin O'Kane is an Australian former professional rugby union player.

O'Kane was an Australian Schoolboys representative player, educated at St Joseph's College, Hunters Hill.

O'Kane played across the amateur and professional era for NSW. He made his NSW debut in 1992 off the bench against the All Blacks as a number eight. He made eight NSW appearances for NSW prior to the first Super 12 tournament.

A hooker, O'Kane served as an understudy to Phil Kearns for the New South Wales Waratahs during the 1990s and made the occasional appearance in the 1996 Super 12 season, before leaving for a stint at London Irish.

O'Kane won three premierships with Gordon, playing over 100 first grade games, at times forming a front row with Wallabies Cam Blades, Andrew Blades and Mark Hartill

His father Seamus O'Kane played for Donegal GAA, before migrating to Australia to work on the Snowy Scheme.

O'Kane has five children, Oliver, Henry O'Kane, Scarlett, Charlie O'Kane, Harvey.

.

In 1999, O'Kane retired from rugby due to recurring knee injuries, aged 28.
