= Jason Mathie =

New Zealand rugby union player (born 1973)

- Full name: Jason Grant Mathie
- Born: 7 June 1973 (age 53)

Rugby union career
- Position: Wing
Provincial / State sides
Years	Team	Apps	(Points)
1995–96	Mid Canterbury	15	(30)
1996–98	Canterbury	14	(80)
Super Rugby
Years	Team	Apps	(Points)
1999	Crusaders	1	(0)

Jason Grant Mathie (born 7 June 1973) is a New Zealand former professional rugby union player.

A product of Christchurch's Hornby club, Mathie was a wing and occasional fullback on the Mid Canterbury and Canterbury sides of the late 1990s, scoring 14 tries from 29 provincial matches.

Mathie made a solitary appearance for the Crusaders during the team's title-winning 1999 Super 12 campaign, coming on off the bench in their round two defeat of the Blues at Eden Park.
