= David Erskine (rugby union) =

Irish rugby union player

David James Erskine
- Born: October 14, 1969 (age 57) Waltham Forest, London, England
- School: Sullivan Upper School, Holywood
- Occupation: Associate Director (Insurance Company)

Rugby union career
- Position(s): Flanker, Lock
- Current team: Retired
Senior career
Years	Team	Apps	(Points)
1994–2000	Sale Sharks		
International career
Years	Team	Apps	(Points)
1997–1998	Ireland	3	(0)

David James Erskine (born October 14, 1969), is an Irish former rugby union player, who played flanker and lock for Sale Sharks, Ulster and Ireland.

Born in Waltham Forest, London, he grew up in Bangor, County Down after his father moved there on business. He attended Sullivan Upper School in Holywood, and represented Ulster Schools at both cricket and rugby. After leaving school he played for C.I.Y.M.S, before moving to Manchester, where he worked in insurance and played rugby for Sale as they returned to the First Division in 1994. He represented the Irish Exiles in the IRFU Interprovincial Championship from 1992 to 1994, after which he was approached by the selectors to represent Ulster. His eligibility to represent the province was initially denied by the IRFU, before being accepted on appeal. He played once for Ulster against Cardiff in the Heineken Cup in 1995, and once in a friendly against Edinburgh District the same year. The following season, Sale refused to release him to play for Ulster.

He was selected for the 1997 Ireland A rugby union tour of Oceania, and was one of the few Irish players to emerge from the tour with much credit. He won three senior caps for Ireland, against New Zealand, Canada and Italy, in the autumn of 1997, but fell out of favour after coach Brian Ashton left in 1998. He continued playing for Sale until he was forced to retire after the 1999–2000 season by a recurring groin injury. As of 2006 he was living in Cheshire with his wife and son, and working as an associate director for an insurance company. In 2012 former Sale lock Dave Baldwin named him at blindside flanker in his Sale "dream team".
