= Stephen Blake-Knox =

Irish rugby union player (born 1948)

- Full name: Stephen Ernest Fitzroy Blake-Knox
- Born: 9 July 1948 (age 78) Dublin, Republic of Ireland
- School: Campbell College, Belfast
- University: University of Dublin

Rugby union career
- Position: Wing
International career
Years	Team	Apps	(Points)
1976–77	Ireland	3	(0)

Stephen Ernest Fitzroy Blake-Knox (born 9 July 1948) is a former Ireland rugby union international from Northern Ireland active from the late 1960s to early 1980s.

Blake-Knox was born in Dublin and attended Campbell College, Belfast.

A speedy winger, Blake-Knox gained three Ireland caps, across the 1976 and 1977 Five Nations. He played for Dublin University and Belfast based club North of Ireland. In provincial rugby, he originally declared for Connacht, but also represented Ulster, for which he later served in various off-field roles.

== See also ==
- List of Ireland national rugby union players
