= Colin Wilkinson =

Northern Ireland rugby union player

- Full name: Colin Robert Wilkinson
- Born: 4 April 1961 (age 65) Belfast, Northern Ireland

Rugby union career
- Position: Fullback
International career
Years	Team	Apps	(Points)
1993	Ireland	1	(0)

Colin Robert Wilkinson (born 4 April 1961) is a former Ireland rugby union international from Northern Ireland.

Born in Belfast, Wilkinson was a fullback with Malone and Ulster, who was capped once for Ireland. He appeared for Ireland against Scotland at Murrayfield in the 1993 Five Nations Championship at the late age of 31, making him the oldest back to debut for the Irish. At the time of his call up, he was a practising solicitor in the town of Downpatrick.

He was assistant coach, under Harry Williams, of Ulster's 1998–99 Heineken Cup-winning team.

Wilkinson received a suspended custodial sentence in 2013 after he pled guilty to seven charges of "obtaining a pecuniary advantage for himself or another", through his work as an insurance broker. Between 2003 and 2005, he had been using illegal means to obtain cheaper health cover. The sentence was suspended for two years

== See also ==
- List of Ireland national rugby union players
