= 1996–97 Heineken Cup =

International rugby union competition

Tournament details
- Countries: England; France; Ireland; Italy; Scotland; Wales
- Tournament format(s): Round-robin and Knockout
- Date: 12 October 1996 to 25 January 1997

Tournament statistics
- Teams: 20
- Matches played: 47
- Attendance: 317,987 (6,766 per match)
- Top point scorer(s): Richard Dourthe (Dax) (82 points)
- Top try scorer(s): Sebastien Carrat (Brive) (10 tries)

Final
- Venue: Cardiff Arms Park, Cardiff
- Attendance: 41,664
- Champions: (France) Brive (1st title)
- Runners-up: (England) Leicester Tigers

The 1996–97 Heineken Cup was the second edition of the Heineken Cup, a competition for the top European rugby union clubs. Competing teams from France, Ireland, Italy, Wales and, for the first time, England and Scotland, were divided into four pools of five, with each team playing the other teams once, meaning two home and two away games per team. The pool winners and runners-up qualified for the knock-out stages. The competition was won by a French team for the second time, when Brive beat their English opponents Leicester Tigers 28–9 at the Cardiff Arms Park. The defending champions Toulouse were knocked out in the semi-final by Leicester Tigers and Brive beat Cardiff in the other semi-final.

== Teams ==
The qualifying teams were drawn from six countries. Generally, these were the strongest teams from the top division of domestic rugby; weaker teams participated in the Challenge Cup:

- England: 4 teams from the English Premiership
- France: 4 teams from the French Championship
- Ireland: 3 teams representing one of the four Provinces of Ireland
- Italy: 2 teams from the National Championship of Excellence
- Scotland: 3 teams representing one of the four geographical districts
- Wales: 4 teams from the Welsh Premier Division

England	France	Ireland	Italy	Scotland	Wales
Bath; Harlequins; Leicester Tigers; London Wasps	Brive; Dax; Pau; Toulouse	Leinster; Munster; Ulster	Benetton Treviso; Rugby Milano	Borders; Caledonia; Edinburgh	Cardiff; Llanelli; Neath; Pontypridd

== Pool stage ==
In the pool matches teams received

- 2 points for a win
- 1 point for a draw

=== Pool 1 ===
Team	P	W	D	L	Tries for	Tries against	Try diff	Points for	Points against	Points diff	Pts
(France) Dax	4	3	0	1	16	2	14	141	69	72	6
(England) Bath	4	3	0	1	15	8	7	136	88	48	6
(Wales) Pontypridd	4	3	0	1	7	3	4	97	60	37	6
(Italy) Benetton Treviso	4	1	0	3	13	15	−2	106	135	−29	2
(Scotland) Edinburgh	4	0	0	4	6	29	−23	71	199	−128	0

=== Pool 2 ===
Team	P	W	D	L	Tries for	Tries against	Try diff	Points for	Points against	Points diff	Pts
(England) Leicester	4	4	0	0	14	3	11	114	43	71	8
(Wales) Llanelli	4	2	0	2	9	9	0	97	81	16	4
(Ireland) Leinster	4	2	0	2	9	12	−3	86	109	−23	4
(France) Pau	4	1	0	3	19	10	9	137	103	34	2
(Scotland) Scottish Borders	4	1	0	3	7	24	−17	80	178	−98	2

=== Pool 3 ===
Team	P	W	D	L	Tries for	Tries against	Try diff	Points for	Points against	Points diff	Pts
(France) Brive	4	4	0	0	13	8	5	106	65	41	8
(England) Harlequins	4	3	0	1	20	8	12	131	95	36	6
(Wales) Neath	4	2	0	2	10	16	−6	83	109	−26	4
(Ireland) Ulster	4	1	0	3	6	10	−4	75	87	−12	2
(Scotland) Caledonia	4	0	0	4	13	20	−7	117	156	−39	0

=== Pool 4 ===
Team	P	W	D	L	Tries for	Tries against	Try diff	Points for	Points against	Points diff	Pts
(France) Toulouse	4	3	0	1	21	13	8	157	142	15	6
(Wales) Cardiff	4	3	0	1	16	7	9	135	97	38	6
(England) London Wasps	4	2	0	2	17	14	3	156	115	41	4
(Ireland) Munster	4	2	0	2	11	22	−11	109	135	−26	4
(Italy) Milan	4	0	0	4	6	15	−9	73	141	−68	0

== Seeding ==
Seed	Pool Winners	Pts	TF	+/−
1	(England) Leicester	8	14	+71
2	(France) Brive	8	13	+41
3	(France) Toulouse	6	21	+15
4	(France) Dax	6	16	+72
Seed	Pool Runners-up	Pts	TF	+/−
5	(England) Harlequins	6	20	+36
6	(Wales) Cardiff RFC	6	16	+38
7	(England) Bath	6	15	+48
8	(Wales) Llanelli RFC	4	9	+16

== Knockout stage ==
Quarter-finals
2	(France) Brive	35
8	(Wales) Llanelli	14
6	(Wales) Cardiff	22
7	(England) Bath	19
1	(England) Leicester Tigers	23
5	(England) Harlequins	13
4	(France) Dax	18
3	(France) Toulouse	26

Semi-finals
2	(France) Brive	26
6	(Wales) Cardiff	13
1	(England) Leicester Tigers	37
3	(France) Toulouse	11

Final
2	(France) Brive	28
1	(England) Leicester Tigers	9

=== Quarter finals ===
9 November 1996
14:30

Cardiff (Wales)	22–19	(England) Bath

Cardiff Arms Park, Cardiff
Attendance: 12,000

16 November 1996
15:00

Leicester Tigers (England)	23–13	(England) Harlequins

Welford Road, Leicester
Attendance: 10,263

16 November 1996
16:00

Dax (France)	18–26	(France) Toulouse

Stade Maurice-Boyau, Dax
Attendance: 14,000

17 November 1996
14:45

Brive (France)	35–14	(Wales) Llanelli

Parc Municipal des Sports, Brive-la-Gaillarde
Attendance: 14,000

=== Semi finals ===
4 January 1997
15:05

Leicester Tigers (England)	37–11	(France) Toulouse

Welford Road
Attendance: 16,300

5 January 1997
15:30

Brive (France)	26–13	(Wales) Cardiff

Parc Municipal des Sports
Attendance: 14,000

=== Final ===
The final was played on 25 January 1997 at the Arms Park in Cardiff. The match was contested by Brive of France and Leicester of England. Brive won the match 28–9; they took the lead early on through a fourth-minute penalty from Christophe Lamaison, and Sébastien Viars extended that lead with an unconverted try two minutes later. Leicester responded with three penalties from John Liley, but Brive finally made their pressure show with three second-half tries, one of which was converted, before Lamaison added a drop goal to seal a 19-point victory.

25 January 1997
14:30

Brive (France)	28–9	(England) Leicester
Try: Viars; Fabre; Carrat (2); Con: Lamaison; Pen: Lamaison; Drop: Lamaison	Report	Pen: Liley (3)

Cardiff Arms Park, Cardiff
Attendance: 41,664
Referee: Derek Bevan (Wales)
