= Tony McWhirter =

Irish rugby union player

- Born: Tony McWhirter
- School: Dalriada School
- University: University of Dundee

Rugby union career
- Position(s): Number 8, lock
Amateur team(s)
| Years | Team | Apps | (Points) |
- Dundee HSFP
| 1997-1999 | Ballymena R.F.C. | | |
| 1999-2004 | Dungannon RFC | | |
Senior career
| Years | Team | Apps | (Points) |
| 1997-2004 | Ulster | 94 | |
- Correct as of 19 November 2022

Tony McWhirter is an Irish former rugby union player, who played number eight and lock for Ulster.

A native of Ballymoney, County Antrim, he attended Dalriada School, where he was part of the team that made the 1993 Ulster Schools' Cup final. He studied dentistry at the University of Dundee, while playing rugby for Dundee HSFP, and represented Ulster at under-20 and under-21 levels, and captained the Ireland under-21 side that won the Triple Crown in 1995-96.

Returning to Northern Ireland, he joined Ballymena R.F.C. and signed a part-time contract with Ulster for the 1997-98 season. Under coach Tony Russ, he played in the second row. He signed a full-time contract for the 1998–99 season, and under coach Harry Williams he moved to his preferred position, number 8. He was part of the Ulster team who won the 1998–99 Heineken Cup. The following season, he moved to Dungannon RFC, and was named Ulster's player of the year. He was called up to the Ireland training squad ahead of the 2001 Six Nations Championship, and was part of the Dungannon team that became the first Ulster club to win the All-Ireland League in 2001. He retired due to a hand injury at the end of the 2003-04 season, having made 94 appearances for Ulster. After retiring, he resumed his career as a dentist, while coaching rugby at Dalriada School.
