= Jeremy Davidson (rugby union) =

Rugby union player from Northern Ireland

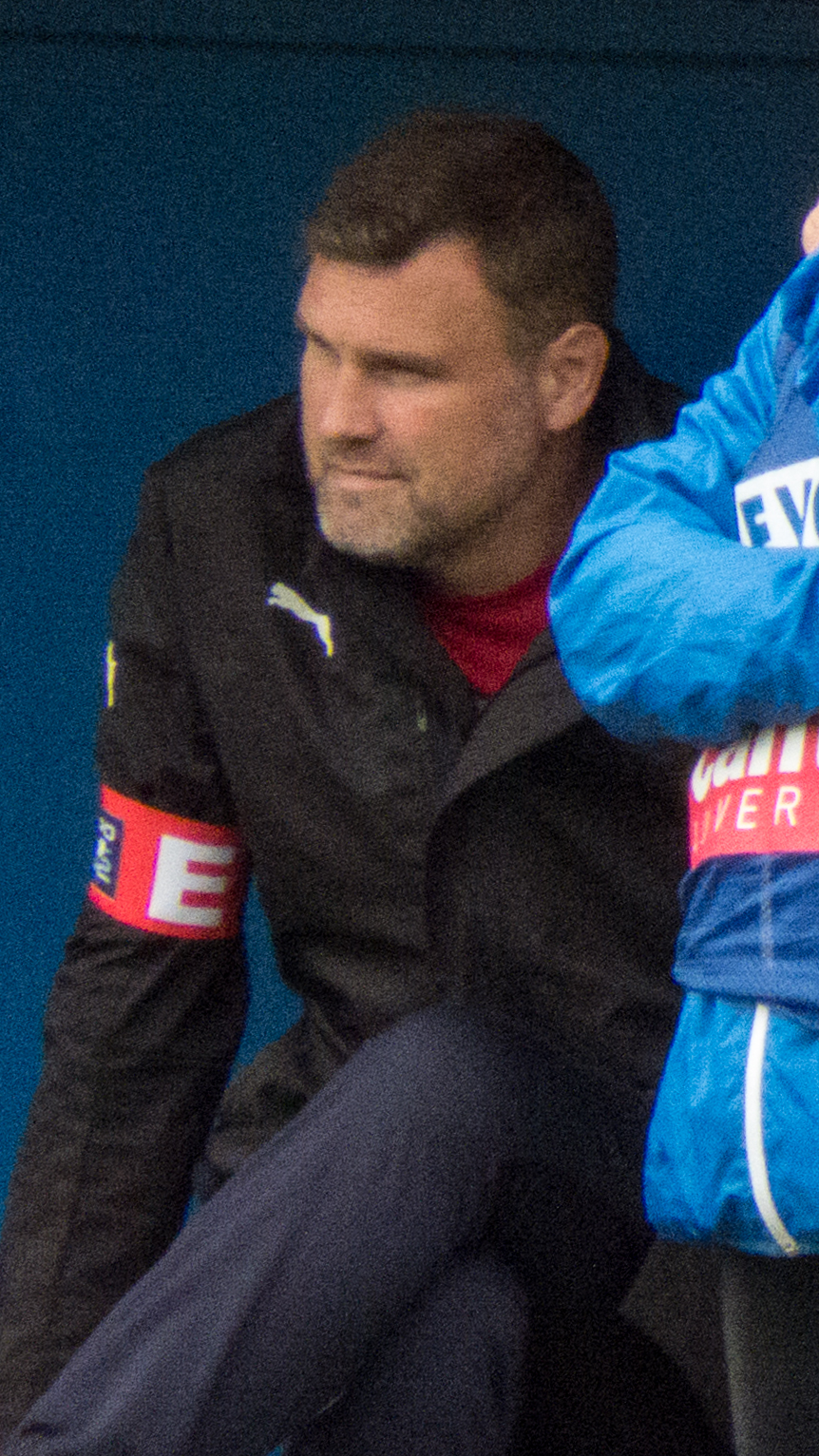
- Born: Jeremy Davidson; 28 April 1974 (age 52) Belfast, Northern Ireland
- Height: 1.98 m (6 ft 6 in)
- Weight: 114 kg (17 st 13 lb)
- School: Methodist College Belfast

Rugby union career
- Position: Lock
Amateur team(s)
Years	Team	Apps	(Points)
- Dungannon
Senior career
Years	Team	Apps	(Points)
1993–1997	Ulster	15	(0)
1997–1998	London Irish		
1998–2001	Castres		
2001–2003	Ulster	23	(0)
International career
Years	Team	Apps	(Points)
1995–2001	Ireland	32	(0)
1997, 2001	British & Irish Lions	3	(0)
Coaching career
- Years: Team
- 2007–2009: Castres (assistant)
- 2009–2011: Ulster
- 2011–2017: Aurillac
- 2017–2018: Bordeaux Bègles
- 2018–2022: Brive
- 2023–2025: Castres

Jeremy William Davidson (born 28 April 1974) is a rugby union coach and former player who played as a lock for Ulster, London Irish and Castres, and at international level for Ireland and the British & Irish Lions.

== Playing career ==
Davidson played lock. He attended Methodist College Belfast.

He played club rugby for Dungannon, Ulster, London Irish and Castres Olympique.

At international level he represented Ireland with 32 caps. On the 1997 British Lions tour to South Africa, he won 3 Test caps and was voted players' player of the tour.

Davidson captained Ulster and London Irish.

His playing career ended at age 27 after aggravating a long-running knee injury whilst fishing.

== Coaching career ==
Following a spell as director of rugby at Dungannon RFC, Davidson moved on to coach Castres. In June 2009 he became part of the coaching team at Ulster. As of 2017 he was coaching French team Aurillac. He then coached Brive until 2022 with whom he won promotion to the top tier of French Rugby. Davidson has now reassumed the position of coach at Castres.

== Personal life ==
Davidson and his wife Lisa have one daughter. He also has two sons from a previous relationship.

His father Dave Davidson represented Northern Ireland at the 1962 British Empire and Commonwealth Games.
