= James Topping =

Rugby union player from Northern Ireland

- Born: James Andrew Topping; 18 December 1974 (age 51) Belfast, Northern Ireland
- Height: 5 ft 11 in (1.80 m)
- Weight: 210 lb (95 kg; 15 st)

Rugby union career
- Position: Wing
International career
Years	Team	Apps	(Points)
1996-2003	Ireland	8	(5)
National sevens team
Years	Team		Comps
2001	Ireland 7s		
Coaching career
- Years: Team
- 2022–2025: Ireland 7s (Head Coach)
- 2026–: Ireland Women 7s (Head Coach)

James “Jimmy” Topping(born 18 December 1974) is an Irish rugby former player and current coach. As a player, he won eight caps for the Ireland national rugby union team between 1996 and 2003, playing on the wing. Topping was born in Belfast and played his club rugby for Ballymena and Ulster.

Topping also played sevens for the Ireland national rugby sevens team. He played at the 2001 Rugby World Cup Sevens and also played several legs on the World Rugby Sevens Series.

Since retiring from playing, Topping has been involved in coaching, including Ulster youth rugby, and the Ireland national rugby sevens team.
