= Paddy Johns =

Ireland international rugby union player

- Born: 19 February 1968 (age 58) Portadown, County Armagh, Northern Ireland
- Height: 6 ft 6 in (1.98 m)
- Weight: 242 lb (110 kg; 17.3 st)
- University: Trinity College Dublin
- Occupation: dentist

Rugby union career
- Position: Lock
Amateur team(s)
Years	Team	Apps	(Points)
1987-2002	Dungannon		
–	Dublin University		
Senior career
Years	Team	Apps	(Points)
1988-1996, 1999-2002	Ulster	69	
1996-1999	Saracens		
International career
Years	Team	Apps	(Points)
1990-2000	Ireland	59	(20)
National sevens team
Years	Team		Comps
	Ireland		1993 7's RWC

Patrick Stephen Johns, known as Paddy Johns (born 19 February 1968) is a retired Irish rugby union player who played at lock and number eight for Dungannon, Dublin University, Ulster, Saracens and Ireland.

== Rugby career ==
Born in Portadown, County Armagh, he attended the Royal School Dungannon and made his senior club debut for Dungannon in 1987.

He made his provincial debut for Ulster in 1998, and went on to make 69 appearances in two stints for the province. In the early years of professionalism he played three seasons at Saracens, helping them win the Tetley's Bitter Cup in 1998. He returned to Ulster in 1999, won the All-Ireland League with Dungannon in 2001, and retired in 2002.

He won 59 caps for Ireland, scoring 4 tries and 20 points. He made his international debut on 27 October 1990 against Argentina, in Dublin, in a match won 20–18, and his final appearance came on 11 November 2000, with Japan, in a win of 78–9, again in Dublin. He played at the 1995 Rugby World Cup and the 1999 Rugby World Cup. He also played for the Ireland national rugby sevens team at the inaugural 1993 Rugby World Cup Sevens, where Ireland reached the semi-finals, its best ever finish in a Rugby World Cup Sevens.

He was appointed head coach of Dungannon in 2012, and held the position until 2014.

== Dentistry ==
Johns studied dentistry at Trinity College Dublin and currently practices as a dental surgeon.

While working as a prison dentist at HM Prison Maghaberry, Johns supported Ireland international Ryan Caldwell (who was incarcerated there at the time) with his mental health difficulties.
