= Maurice Field =

Irish rugby union player

- Born: 24 February 1964 (age 62) Greenisland, County Antrim
- School: Belfast High School

Rugby union career
Amateur team(s)
Years	Team	Apps	(Points)
-1988	North of Ireland		
1988-2000	Malone		
Provincial / State sides
Years	Team	Apps	(Points)
1989-98	Ulster	53	(37)
International career
Years	Team	Apps	(Points)
1994-97	Ireland	17	(0)

Maurice Field (born Greenisland, County Antrim, 24 February 1964) is a former Irish rugby union international player who played as a centre for North of Ireland, Malone, Ulster and Ireland.

He was educated at Belfast High School, and started his club rugby career at North of Ireland. He played for Ulster under-20 in 1983, and Ulster under-23 in 1984. He moved clubs to Malone in 1988, and was first selected for the senior Ulster team in September 1989, becoming a regular for the provincial side. He was one of the first players to sign a full-time contract with Ulster when the game went professional. He was part of the Ulster squad that won the 1998–99 Heineken Cup, although he was unavailable for the final.

He was selected in the provisional Ireland squad for the 1991 Rugby World Cup, but did not make his international debut until 1994, against England, at the age of 30. He played for Ireland from 1994 to 1997, winning 17 caps. He was a member of the Ireland squad at the 1995 Rugby World Cup where he played in two matches.

During the amateur era, he worked as a firefighter for the Northern Ireland Fire and Rescue Service. The day before his Ireland debut in 1994, he had attended a fatal car bombing. In 2004 he was appointed Elite Player Development Manager for the Ulster academy. He has worked as a commentator for the BBC and RTÉ. As of March 2022, he lectures in sports management at Ulster University.
