= 1997 Ireland A rugby union tour of Oceania =

Summary
P	W	D	L
Total
7	1	0	6
Test match
1	0	0	1
Opponent
P	W	D	L
Western Samoa
1	0	0	1

The 1997 Ireland rugby union tour of Oceania was a series of matches played in May in June 1997 in New Zealand and Samoa by the Ireland A national rugby union team, while the best Irish players where involved in the 1997 British Lions tour to South Africa.

== Results ==
Scores and results list Ireland's points tally first.

Opposing Team	For	Against	Date	Venue
North Auckland	16	69	22 May 1997	Whāngarei
NZ Academy	15	74	26 May 1997	North Harbour Stadium, Albany
Bay of Plenty	39	52	29 May 1997	Rotorua International Stadium, Rotorua
Thames Valley	38	12	1 June 1997	Paeroa
King Country	26	32	6 June 1997	Owen Delany Park Taupō
NZ Maori XV	10	41	10 June 1997	Palmerston North
Samoa XV	25	57	14 June 1997	Apia
