= Denis McBride (rugby union) =

Rugby union player from Northern Ireland

- Born: September 9, 1964 (age 62)
- Height: 5 ft 11 in (1.80 m)
- Weight: 199 lb (90 kg; 14.2 st)

Rugby union career
- Position: Flanker
International career
| Years | Team | Apps | (Points) |
| 1988–1997 | Ireland | 32 | (18) |
National sevens team
| Years | Team | | Comps |
| 1993 1997 | Ireland | | |

(William) Denis McBride is a retired Irish rugby union player. He played as an openside wing-forward and earned 32 caps for the Irish national team between 1988 and 1997. He played for the Ireland national rugby sevens team at the 1993 Rugby World Cup Sevens, where Ireland reached the semifinals. He played his club rugby for Malone and provincial rugby for Ulster.

He grew up in Merville Garden Village, Whitehouse, County Antrim in a flat above the shops with his parents and brother Ken and attended Belfast High School. He studied Mechanical Engineering at Queen's University of Belfast and is a Chartered Engineer and a governor of Belfast High School.
