= Gary Leslie =

Irish rugby union player

- Born: Gary Leslie
- School: Belfast High School
- University: Queen's University Belfast

Rugby union career
- Position: Prop
Amateur team(s)
Years	Team	Apps	(Points)
-1991	Queen's University RFC		
1991-2004	Dungannon RFC	159	
Senior career
Years	Team	Apps	(Points)
1994-1999	Ulster	59	
International career
Years	Team	Apps	(Points)
1997-1998	Ireland 'A'	2	
- Correct as of 19 November 2022

Gary Leslie is an Irish former rugby union player. He played tighthead prop for Queen's University RFC, Dungannon RFC, Ulster, and Ireland 'A'.

He attended Belfast High School, representing Ulster and Ireland at schools level at rugby. He studied Combined Social Sciences at Queen's University Belfast, while playing for Queen's University RFC. Graduating in 1991, he enrolled in Moy Park’s Graduate Management Trainee programme, and joined Dungannon RFC.

With Dungannon, he won the Ulster Senior Cup five times, the Stevenson Shield once, the All-Ireland Floodlit Trophy in 1995, and was part of the Dungannon team who became the first Ulster club to win the All-Ireland League in 2001. At his retirement from club rugby in 2004, he held the record for the most All-Ireland League appearances with 159. He was first selected for Ulster in 1994, and played 59 times for the province. He was part of the 1999 Heineken Cup-winning squad, appearing from the bench in the final. He had a part-time contract with Ulster, retaining his full-time position as a production manager for Moy Park. He played twice for Ireland 'A' in 1997 and 1998.

He became Director of Operations, Primary Division, for Moy Park in 2009, and Director of Complexes, Fresh Business Unit in 2018. He was also active in rugby administration. He was senior vice-president of the Ulster Branch of the IRFU in 2018-19, and was appointed president of the branch in 2019, retaining the position for a second year in 2020.
