= History of rugby union matches between Munster and Connacht =

Munster versus Connacht is a rivalry that dates back to the foundation of the game in Ireland in 1879. Games between the two have occurred on an annual basis since the inception of the IRFU Interprovincial Championship in 1946. Since the beginning of the inter-provincials in 1946, Munster hold an 90–14 advantage in overall wins, with three draws. Additionally, since the inception of the Celtic League in 2001–02, Munster hold a 38–10 advantage in overall wins, with one draw in that time.

== Summary of games since 1946 ==
Details	Played	Won by Munster	Won by Connacht	Drawn
Munster Home	54	49	4	1
Connacht Home	53	41	10	2
Overall	107	90	14	3

== Statistics ==
Record	Connacht	Munster
Longest winning streak	2 (2015/16, 2021/22–2022/23)	22 (1987/88 – 2003/04)
Largest points for
Home	35 (2015–2016)	53 (1999–2000)
Away	33 (2023–2024)	67 (1999–2000)
Largest winning margin
Home	43 (53–10; 1999–2000)	21 (35–14; 2015–2016)
Away	6 (12–18; 2015–2016)	50 (17–67; 1999–2000)
Largest aggregate score
84 (Connacht 17 Munster 67; 1999–2000)
Lowest aggregate score
0 (Munster 0 Connacht 3; 1953–1954) (Munster 3 Connacht 0; 1957–1958)
Highest attendance
27,870 (2024-25 United Rugby Championship, MacHale Park, 29 March 2025)

== Results ==
A history of Munster–Connacht results since the formation of the inter-provincial championship in 1946:

Season	Home	Away	Winner	Note(s)
1946–47	Connacht 10	Munster 13	Munster (1)	
1947–48	Munster 24	Connacht 3	Munster (2)	
1948–49	Connacht 6	Munster 20	Munster (3)	
1949–50	Munster 6	Connacht 5	Munster (4)	
1950–51	Connacht 8	Munster 12	Munster (5)	
1951–52	Munster 28	Connacht 3	Munster (6)	
1952–53	Connacht 0	Munster 8	Munster (7)	
1953–54	Munster 0	Connacht 3	Connacht (1)	
1954–55	Connacht 3	Munster 8	Munster (8)	
1955–56	Munster 8	Connacht 3	Munster (9)	
1956–57	Connacht 10	Munster 3	Connacht (2)	
1957–58	Munster 3	Connacht 0	Munster (10)	
1958–59	Connacht 0	Munster 9	Munster (11)	
1959–60	Munster 6	Connacht 0	Munster (12)	
1960–61	Connacht 0	Munster 5	Munster (13)	
1961–62	Munster 11	Connacht 3	Munster (14)	
1962–63	Connacht 0	Munster 6	Munster (15)	
1963–64	Munster 12	Connacht 8	Munster (16)	
1964–65	Connacht 5	Munster 5	Draw (1)	
1965–66	Munster 9	Connacht 3	Munster (17)	
1966–67	Connacht 6	Munster 12	Munster (18)	
1967–68	Munster 11	Connacht 9	Munster (19)	
1968–69	Connacht 3	Munster 12	Munster (20)	
1969–70	Munster 22	Connacht 0	Munster (21)	
1970–71	Connacht 0	Munster 9	Munster (22)	
1971–72	Munster 10	Connacht 0	Munster (23)	
1972–73	Connacht 3	Munster 12	Munster (24)	
1973–74	Munster 29	Connacht 7	Munster (25)	
1974–75	Connacht 6	Munster 6	Draw (2)	
1975–76	Munster 16	Connacht 6	Munster (26)	
1976–77	Connacht 6	Munster 13	Munster (27)	
1977–78	Munster 10	Connacht 6	Munster (28)	
1978–79	Connacht 3	Munster 19	Munster (29)	
1979–80	Munster 16	Connacht 20	Connacht (3)	
1980–81	Connacht 0	Munster 16	Munster (30)	
1981–82	Munster 21	Connacht 18	Munster (31)	
1982–83	Connacht 7	Munster 9	Munster (32)	
1983–84	Munster 29	Connacht 7	Munster (33)	
1984–85	Connacht 9	Munster 15	Munster (34)	
1985–86	Munster 16	Connacht 9	Munster (35)	
1986–87	Connacht 11	Munster 9	Connacht (4)	
1987–88	Munster 17	Connacht 12	Munster (36)	
1988–89	Connacht 10	Munster 25	Munster (37)	
1989–90	Munster 14	Connacht 10	Munster (38)	
1990–91	Connacht 18	Munster 19	Munster (39)	
1991–92	Munster 15	Connacht 9	Munster (40)	
1992–93	Connacht 10	Munster 20	Munster (41)	
1993–94	Munster 15	Connacht 9	Munster (42)	
1994–95	Connacht 20	Munster 60	Munster (43)	
1995–96	Connacht 11	Munster 46	Munster (44)	
1996–97	Munster 45	Connacht 28	Munster (45)	
1997–98	Connacht 9	Munster 29	Munster (46)	
1998–99	Connacht 13	Munster 18	Munster (47)	
1998–99	Munster 21	Connacht 7	Munster (48)	
1999–2000	Connacht 17	Munster 67	Munster (49)	
1999–2000	Munster 53	Connacht 10	Munster (50)	
2000–01	Munster 36	Connacht 13	Munster (51)	
2000–01	Connacht 13	Munster 23	Munster (52)	
2001–02	Munster 40	Connacht 19	Munster (53)	
2002–03	Munster 33	Connacht 3	Munster (54)	2002–03 Celtic League quarter-final
2002–03	Munster 43	Connacht 5	Munster (55)	
2003–04	Connacht 0	Munster 3	Munster (56)	
2003–04	Munster 39	Connacht 10	Munster (57)	
2004–05	Munster 27	Connacht 27	Draw (3)	
2005–06	Connacht 19	Munster 44	Munster (58)	
2005–06	Munster 36	Connacht 17	Munster (59)	
2006–07	Munster 13	Connacht 0	Munster (60)	
2006–07	Connacht 8	Munster 14	Munster (61)	
2007–08	Munster 17	Connacht 0	Munster (62)	
2007–08	Connacht 5	Munster 16	Munster (63)	
2008–09	Connacht 12	Munster 6	Connacht (5)	
2008–09	Munster 25	Connacht 10	Munster (64)	
2009–10	Munster 35	Connacht 3	Munster (65)	
2009–10	Connacht 12	Munster 18	Munster (66)	
2010–11	Connacht 12	Munster 16	Munster (67)	
2010–11	Munster 22	Connacht 6	Munster (68)	
2011–12	Munster 24	Connacht 9	Munster (69)	
2011–12	Connacht 16	Munster 20	Munster (70)	
2012–13	Connacht 12	Munster 16	Munster (71)	
2012–13	Munster 22	Connacht 0	Munster (72)	
2013–14	Munster 22	Connacht 16	Munster (73)	
2013–14	Connacht 23	Munster 32	Munster (74)	
2014–15	Connacht 24	Munster 16	Connacht (6)	
2014–15	Munster 42	Connacht 20	Munster (75)	
2015–16	Munster 12	Connacht 18	Connacht (7)	
2015–16	Connacht 35	Munster 14	Connacht (8)	
2016–17	Connacht 9	Munster 16	Munster (76)	
2016–17	Munster 50	Connacht 14	Munster (77)	
2017–18	Connacht 20	Munster 16	Connacht (9)	
2017–18	Munster 39	Connacht 13	Munster (78)	
2018–19	Connacht 24	Munster 31	Munster (79)	
2018–19	Munster 27	Connacht 14	Munster (80)	
2019–20	Connacht 14	Munster 19	Munster (81)	
2019–20	Munster 49	Connacht 12	Munster (82)	Munster home match played at the Aviva Stadium due to COVID-19 pandemic.
2020–21	Connacht 10	Munster 16	Munster (83)	
2020–21	Munster 20	Connacht 17	Munster (84)	
2020–21	Munster 20	Connacht 24	Connacht (10)	Pro14 Rainbow Cup fixture.
2021–22	Munster 20	Connacht 18	Munster (85)	
2021–22	Connacht 10	Munster 8	Connacht (11)	
2022–23	Connacht 20	Munster 11	Connacht (12)	
2022–23	Munster 24	Connacht 17	Munster (86)	
2023–24	Connacht 22	Munster 9	Connacht (13)	
2023–24	Munster 47	Connacht 12	Munster (87)	
2023–24	Munster 35	Connacht 33	Munster (88)	
2024–25	Connacht 24	Munster 30	Munster (89)	First Connacht match at MacHale Park in County Mayo
2025–26	Munster 17	Connacht 15	Munster (90)	
2025–26	Connacht 26	Munster 07	Connacht (14)	First Connacht inter-pro home win at new Dexcom Stadium

== Gallery ==
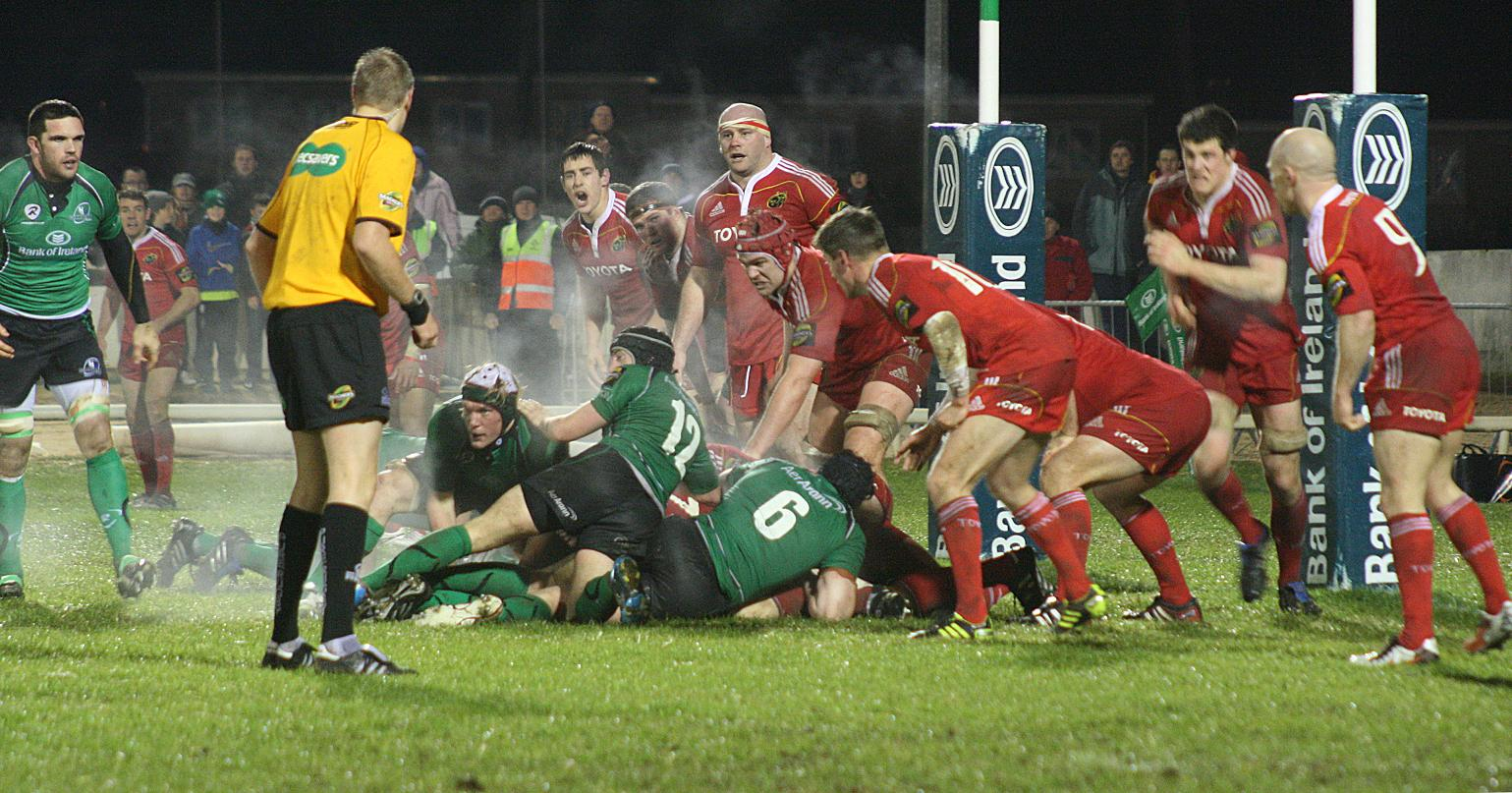
Connacht ruck during a match on 27 December 2010

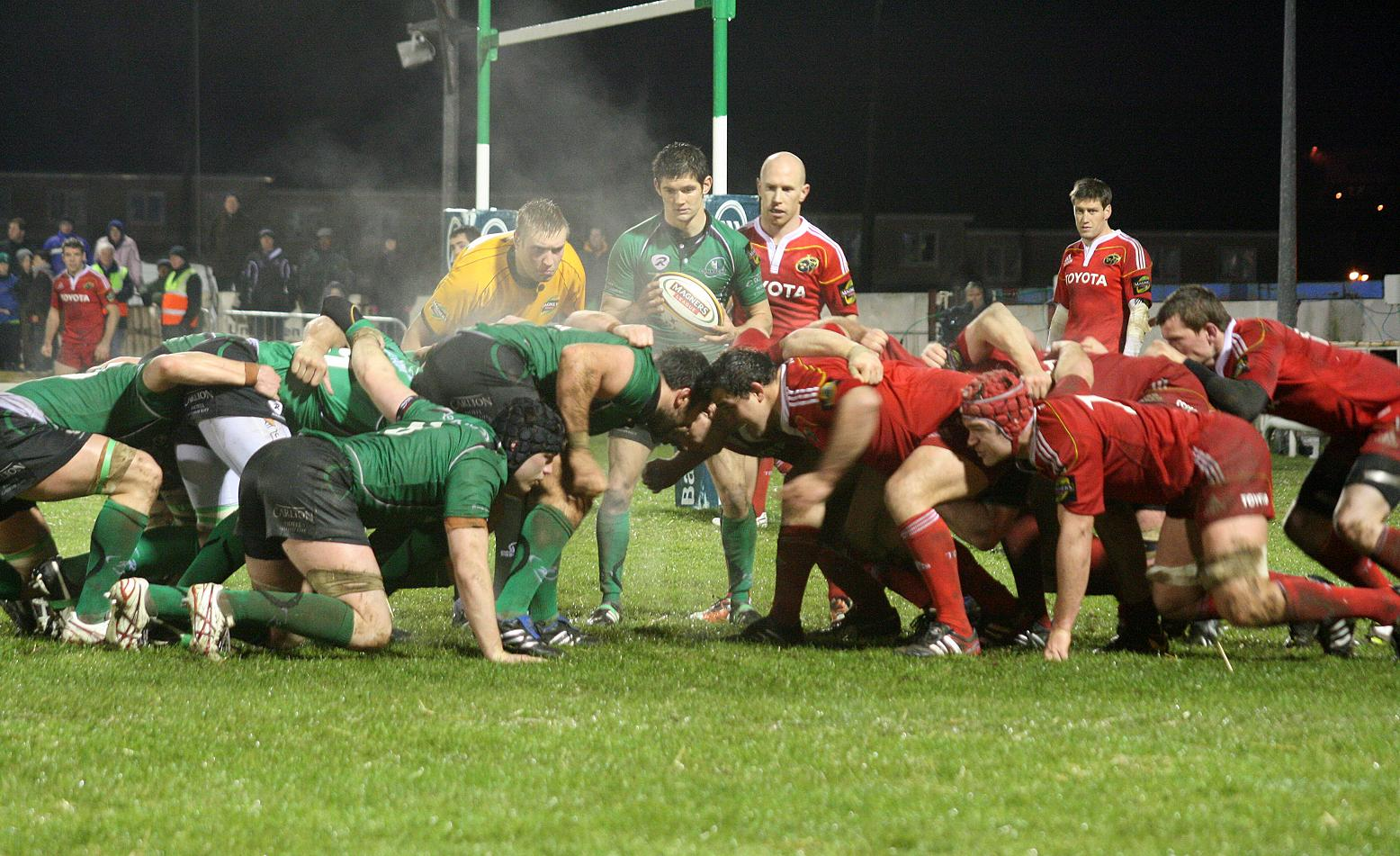
Connacht and Munster scrum in 2010 Magners league matchup

== See also ==
- IRFU Interprovincial Championship
- History of rugby union matches between Connacht and Ulster
- History of rugby union matches between Leinster and Connacht
- History of rugby union matches between Leinster and Munster
- History of rugby union matches between Leinster and Ulster
- History of rugby union matches between Munster and Ulster
