= History of rugby union matches between Leinster and Connacht =

Connacht Rugby and Leinster Rugby are two Irish rugby union provincial teams that possess a rivalry that dates back to their IRFU Interprovincial Championship clashes during the amateur era. That rivalry has continued and even intensified since the emergence of the professional era in the late 1990s. Connacht and Leinster comprise two of the four Irish provincial teams competing in the United Rugby Championship (formerly known as the Celtic League and then the Pro14). As such, the two sides regularly face each other during the regular season, and occasionally during the knock-out rounds.

The rivalry has been heightened on several occasions due to certain games or events. Connacht and Leinster met in the 2016 Pro12 Grand Final, with Connacht winning 20–10, to claim their first Pro12 championship. Leinster has observed that the rivalry leads Connacht to raise their game when playing Leinster, leading to resentment among Leinster players when this causes them to lose matches they had expected to win. Connacht defeated Leinster 47–10 in 2017, and were so comfortable in their victory that they had a forward kick a conversion. Connacht and Leinster players have recognized the rivalry that exists between the two teams.

Below are the historical results of the Irish Rugby Football Union teams, Leinster and Connacht, as part of the IRFU Interprovincial Championship, and later the Celtic League, Pro12 and Pro14.

== Overall Summary of Games Since 1946 ==
Played	Won by Leinster	Won by Connacht	Drawn
110	87	19	4

== Statistics ==
Record	Connacht	Leinster
Longest winning streak	2 (2015–2016)	20 (1965–1985)
Largest points for
Home	47 (2017–18)	56 (2021–22)
Away	35 (2020–21)	53 (1999–00)
Largest winning margin
Home	37 (47–10; 2017–18)	47 (54–7; 2019–20)
Away	11 (24–35; 2020–21)	45 (8–53; 1999–00) (5–50; 2026–27)
Largest aggregate score
76 (Leinster 56 Connacht 20; 2021–22)
Lowest aggregate score
0 (Leinster 0 Connacht 0; 1960–61)

== Results between 1946 and 1995 ==
Season	Winner	Loser	Winner	Note(s)
1946–47	Leinster 5	Connacht 5	Draw (1)	
1947–48	Leinster 15	Connacht 0	Leinster (1)	
1948–49	Leinster 3	Connacht 0	Leinster (2)	
1949–50	Leinster 31	Connacht 3	Leinster (3)	
1950–51	Connacht 10	Leinster 6	Connacht (1)	
1951–52	Leinster 39	Connacht 3	Leinster (4)	
1952–53	Leinster 35	Connacht 0	Leinster (5)	
1953–54	Leinster 34	Connacht 14	Leinster (6)	
1954–55	Leinster 6	Connacht 3	Leinster (7)	
1955–56	Connacht 8	Leinster 6	Connacht (2)	
1956–57	Leinster 19	Connacht 3	Leinster (8)	
1957–58	Leinster 9	Connacht 3	Leinster (9)	
1958–59	Leinster 9	Connacht 3	Leinster (10)	
1959–60	Leinster 3	Connacht 3	Draw (2)	
1960–61	Leinster 0	Connacht 0	Draw (3)	Lowest scoring match in the history of this fixture
1961–62	Leinster 13	Connacht 9	Leinster (11)	
1962–63	Leinster 18	Connacht 17	Leinster (12)	
1963–64	Leinster 11	Connacht 6	Leinster (13)	
1964–65	Leinster 6	Connacht 6	Draw (4)	
1965–66	Leinster 13	Connacht 6	Leinster (14)	
1966–67	Leinster 26	Connacht 3	Leinster (15)	
1967–68	Leinster 24	Connacht 11	Leinster (16)	
1968–69	Leinster 15	Connacht 6	Leinster (17)	
1969–70	Leinster 26	Connacht 6	Leinster (18)	
1970–71	Leinster 11	Connacht 3	Leinster (19)	
1971–72	Leinster 12	Connacht 6	Leinster (20)	
1972–73	Leinster 13	Connacht 0	Leinster (21)	
1973–74	Leinster 20	Connacht 13	Leinster (22)	
1974–75	Leinster 12	Connacht 3	Leinster (23)	
1975–76	Leinster 7	Connacht 0	Leinster (24)	
1976–77	Leinster 21	Connacht 7	Leinster (25)	
1977–78	Leinster 30	Connacht 9	Leinster (26)	
1978–79	Leinster 13	Connacht 6	Leinster (27)	
1979–80	Leinster 25	Connacht 10	Leinster (28)	
1980–81	Leinster 18	Connacht 9	Leinster (29)	
1981–82	Leinster 20	Connacht 10	Leinster (30)	
1982–83	Leinster 13	Connacht 7	Leinster (31)	
1983–84	Leinster 29	Connacht 6	Leinster (32)	
1984–85	Leinster 14	Connacht 3	Leinster (33)	
1985–86	Connacht 9	Leinster 6	Connacht (3)	
1986–87	Leinster 41	Connacht 6	Leinster (34)	
1987–88	Leinster 20	Connacht 19	Leinster (35)	
1988–89	Connacht 11	Leinster 10	Connacht (4)	
1989–90	Leinster 16	Connacht 12	Leinster (36)	
1990–91	Leinster 20	Connacht 18	Leinster (37)	
1991–92	Leinster 24	Connacht 9	Leinster (38)	
1992–93	Connacht 28	Leinster 9	Connacht (5)	
1993–94	Leinster 15	Connacht 11	Leinster (39)	
1994–95	Connacht 20	Leinster 19	Connacht (6)	

== Results since 1995/96 season ==
Season	Home	Away	Winner	Note(s)
1995–96	Leinster 41	Connacht 9	Leinster (40)	
1996–97	Connacht 22	Leinster 13	Connacht (7)	
1997–98	Leinster 23	Connacht 6	Leinster (41)	
1998–99	Leinster 29	Connacht 24	Leinster (42)	
1998–99	Connacht 24	Leinster 23	Connacht (8)	
1999–00	Leinster 22	Connacht 19	Leinster (43)	
1999–00	Connacht 8	Leinster 53	Leinster (44)	
2000–01	Leinster 21	Connacht 15	Leinster (45)	
2000-01	Connacht 22	Leinster 20	Connacht (9)	
2001–02	Connacht 20	Leinster 49	Leinster (46)	
2002-03	Leinster 23	Connacht 26	Connacht (10)	
2003–04	Leinster 21	Connacht 6	Leinster (47)	
2003–04	Connacht 35	Leinster 24	Connacht (11)	
2004–05	Leinster 18	Connacht 9	Leinster (48)	
2004–05	Connacht 21	Leinster 26	Leinster (49)	
2005–06	Connacht 9	Leinster 21	Leinster (50)	
2005–06	Leinster 16	Connacht 13	Leinster (51)	
2005–06	Connacht 16	Leinster 31	Leinster (52)	
2005–06	Leinster 30	Connacht 21	Leinster (53)	
2006–07	Leinster 29	Connacht 9	Leinster (54)	
2006–07	Connacht 10	Leinster 16	Leinster (55)	
2008–09	Connacht 19	Leinster 18	Connacht (12)	
2008–09	Leinster 26	Connacht 18	Leinster (56)	
2009–10	Leinster 17	Connacht 14	Leinster (57)	
2009–10	Connacht 27	Leinster 13	Connacht (13)	
2010–11	Connacht 6	Leinster 18	Leinster (58)	
2010–11	Leinster 30	Connacht 8	Leinster (59)	
2011–12	Leinster 30	Connacht 20	Leinster (60)	
2011–12	Connacht 13	Leinster 15	Leinster (61)	
2012–13	Connacht 34	Leinster 6	Connacht (14)	
2012–13	Leinster 17	Connacht 0	Leinster (62)	
2013–14	Leinster 16	Connacht 12	Leinster (63)	
2013–14	Connacht 8	Leinster 16	Leinster (64)	
2014–15	Connacht 10	Leinster 9	Connacht (15)	
2014–15	Leinster 21	Connacht 11	Leinster (65)	
2015–16	Leinster 13	Connacht 0	Leinster (66)	
2015–16	Connacht 7	Leinster 6	Connacht (16)	
2015–16	Connacht 20	Leinster 10	Connacht (17)	2016 Pro12 Grand Final
2016–17	Leinster 24	Connacht 13	Leinster (67)	
2016–17	Connacht 24	Leinster 37	Leinster (68)	
2017–18	Leinster 21	Connacht 18	Leinster (69)	
2017–18	Connacht 47	Leinster 10	Connacht (18)	Highest margin of victory for Connacht
2018–19	Connacht 3	Leinster 20	Leinster (70)	
2018–19	Leinster 33	Connacht 29	Leinster (71)	
2019–20	Connacht 11	Leinster 42	Leinster (72)	
2019–20	Leinster 54	Connacht 7	Leinster (73)	Highest margin of victory for Leinster
2020–21	Leinster 24	Connacht 35	Connacht (19)	
2020–21	Connacht 21	Leinster 50	Leinster (74)	Rainbow Cup fixture
2021–22	Leinster 47	Connacht 19	Leinster (75)	
2021–22	Connacht 8	Leinster 45	Leinster (76)	
2021–22	Connacht 21	Leinster 26	Leinster (77)	
2021–22	Leinster 56	Connacht 20	Leinster (78)	Highest scoring match between the two sides
2022–23	Connacht 0	Leinster 10	Leinster (79)	
2022–23	Leinster 41	Connacht 12	Leinster (80)	
2023–24	Connacht 22	Leinster 24	Leinster (81)	
2023–24	Leinster 33	Connacht 7	Leinster (82)	
2024–25	Connacht 12	Leinster 33	Leinster (83)	
2024–25	Leinster 20	Connacht 12	Leinster (84)	
2025–26	Leinster 52	Connacht 17	Leinster (85)	
2025–26	Connacht 23	Leinster 34	Leinster (86)	Opening of the new Clan Stand and record Sportsground attendance of 12,481
2026–27	Connacht 5	Leinster 50	Leinster (87)	

== See also ==
- History of rugby union matches between Connacht and Ulster
- History of rugby union matches between Leinster and Munster
- History of rugby union matches between Leinster and Ulster
- History of rugby union matches between Munster and Connacht
- History of rugby union matches between Munster and Ulster
- IRFU Interprovincial Championship
