= History of rugby union matches between Connacht and Ulster =

Connacht Rugby and Ulster Rugby are two Irish rugby union provincial teams that possess a rivalry that dates back to their IRFU Interprovincial Championship clashes during the amateur era. That rivalry has continued during the professional era and intensified as Connacht have more competitive in the domestic league, winning 2015-16 Pro12 championship. Connacht and Ulster comprise two of the four Irish provincial teams competing in the United Rugby Championship (formerly known as the Celtic League). As such, the two sides regularly face each other during the regular season. Typically, Ulster have had the advantage in the series with Connacht failing to achieve a single victory over Ulster between 1965 and 1982. Following Connacht's victory in 1983, it would not be until the 1997–98 season until they would achieve their next victory over Ulster. Connacht also went 58 years without winning a match in Belfast.

Below are the historical results of the Irish Rugby Football Union teams, Ulster and Connacht, as part of the IRFU Interprovincial Championship, and later the Celtic League, Pro12, Pro14, and United Rugby Championship.

== Overall Summary of Games Since 1946 ==
Details	Played	Won by Connacht	Won by Ulster	Drawn
Connacht Home	50	18	28	4
Ulster Home	57	5	52	0
Overall	107	23	80	4

== Statistics ==
Highest scoring match

2013–14: 70 points (Ulster 58 Connacht 12)

Lowest scoring match

1965–66: 6 points (Ulster 3 Connacht 3)

Highest margin of victory

Ulster: 46 points (58–12 in 2013–14)

Connacht: 28 points (44–16 at home in 2017–18)

Most consecutive wins

Ulster: 13 (1966–1979)

Connacht: 3 (1954–1957, 2017–2019)

== Amateur Era Results 1946–1995 ==
Season	Winner	Loser	Winner	Note(s)
1946–47	Ulster 26	Connacht 5	Ulster (1)	
1947–48	Ulster 19	Connacht 0	Ulster (2)	
1948–49	Ulster 30	Connacht 6	Ulster (3)	
1949–50	Ulster 12	Connacht 3	Ulster (4)	
1950–51	Ulster 26	Connacht 3	Ulster (5)	
1951–52	Ulster 13	Connacht 0	Ulster (6)	
1952–53	Ulster 28	Connacht 3	Ulster (7)	
1953–54	Ulster 11	Connacht 3	Ulster (8)	
1954–55	Connacht 14	Ulster 6	Connacht (1)	
1955–56	Connacht 12	Ulster 9	Connacht (2)	
1956–57	Connacht 6	Ulster 3	Connacht (3)	
1957–58	Ulster 23	Connacht 12	Ulster (9)	
1958–59	Connacht 14	Ulster 5	Connacht (4)	
1959–60	Ulster 9	Connacht 3	Ulster (10)	
1960–61	Connacht 6	Ulster 3	Connacht (5)	
1961–62	Ulster 11	Connacht 0	Ulster (11)	
1962–63	Ulster 19	Connacht 6	Ulster (12)	
1963–64	Connacht 13	Ulster 3	Connacht (6)	
1964–65	Connacht 13	Ulster 3	Connacht (7)	
1965–66	Connacht 3	Ulster 3	Draw (1)	Lowest scoring match in the history of this fixture
1966–67	Ulster 9	Connacht 8	Ulster (13)	
1967–68	Ulster 14	Connacht 12	Ulster (14)	
1968–69	Ulster 11	Connacht 9	Ulster (15)	
1969–70	Ulster 20	Connacht 0	Ulster (16)	
1970–71	Ulster 42	Connacht 0	Ulster (17)	
1971–72	Ulster 13	Connacht 0	Ulster (18)	
1972–73	Ulster 37	Connacht 6	Ulster (19)	
1973–74	Ulster 17	Connacht 14	Ulster (20)	
1974–75	Ulster 29	Connacht 6	Ulster (21)	
1975–76	Ulster 6	Connacht 3	Ulster (22)	
1976–77	Ulster 13	Connacht 3	Ulster (23)	
1977–78	Ulster 18	Connacht 3	Ulster (24)	
1978–79	Ulster 11	Connacht 4	Ulster (25)	
1979–80	Connacht 6	Ulster 6	Draw (2)	
1980–81	Ulster 13	Connacht 12	Ulster (26)	
1981–82	Ulster 6	Connacht 3	Ulster (27)	
1982–83	Ulster 22	Connacht 21	Ulster (28)	
1983–84	Connacht 9	Ulster 4	Connacht (8)	
1984–85	Ulster 28	Connacht 6	Ulster (29)	
1985–86	Ulster 12	Connacht 6	Ulster (30)	
1986–87	Ulster 37	Connacht 6	Ulster (31)	
1987–88	Ulster 20	Connacht 3	Ulster (32)	
1988–89	Ulster 16	Connacht 3	Ulster (33)	
1989–90	Ulster 38	Connacht 3	Ulster (34)	
1990–91	Ulster 16	Connacht 9	Ulster (35)	
1991–92	Connacht 10	Ulster 10	Draw (3)	
1992–93	Ulster 19	Connacht 6	Ulster (36)	
1993–94	Ulster 39	Connacht 10	Ulster (37)	
1994–95	Ulster 20	Connacht 6	Ulster (38)	

== Professional Era Results since 1995/96 season ==
Season	Home	Away	Winner	Report/Note(s)
1995–96	Connacht 9	Ulster 27	Ulster (39)	
1996–97	Ulster 32	Connacht 27	Ulster (40)	
1997–98	Connacht 27	Ulster 12	Connacht (9)	
1998–99	Connacht 21	Ulster 18	Connacht (10)	
1998–99	Ulster 36	Connacht 6	Ulster (41)	
1999–00	Connacht 9	Ulster 50	Ulster (42)	
1999–00	Ulster 44	Connacht 22	Ulster (43)	
2000–01	Connacht 15	Ulster 39	Ulster (44)	
2000-01	Ulster 36	Connacht 22	Ulster (45)	
2001–02	Connacht 17	Ulster 18	Ulster (46)	
2002–03	No match held			
2003–04	Connacht 31	Ulster 20	Connacht (11)	
2003–04	Ulster 42	Connacht 27	Ulster (47)	
2004–05	Connacht 13	Ulster 19	Ulster (48)	
2004–05	Ulster 23	Connacht 14	Ulster (49)	
2005–06	Ulster 36	Connacht 10	Ulster (50)	
2005–06	Connacht 22	Ulster 12	Connacht (12)	
2006–07	Connacht 17	Ulster 24	Ulster (51)	
2006–07	Ulster 20	Connacht 10	Ulster (52)	
2007–08	Connacht 13	Ulster 30	Ulster (53)	
2007–08	Ulster 18	Connacht 6	Ulster (54)	
2008–09	Ulster 53	Connacht 13	Ulster (55)	
2008–09	Connacht 12	Ulster 14	Ulster (56)	
2009–10	Connacht 6	Ulster 30	Ulster (57)	
2009–10	Ulster 41	Connacht 10	Ulster (58)	
2010–11	Connacht 15	Ulster 15	Draw (4)	
2010–11	Ulster 27	Connacht 16	Ulster (59)	
2011–12	Ulster 22	Connacht 3	Ulster (60)	
2011–12	Connacht 26	Ulster 21	Connacht (13)	
2012–13	Ulster 25	Connacht 0	Ulster (61)	
2012–13	Connacht 18	Ulster 34	Ulster (62)	
2013–14	Connacht 7	Ulster 18	Ulster (63)	
2013–14	Ulster 58	Connacht 12	Ulster (64)	
2014–15	Ulster 13	Connacht 10	Ulster (65)	
2014–15	Connacht 20	Ulster 27	Ulster (66)	
2015–16	Connacht 3	Ulster 10	Ulster (67)	
2015–16	Ulster 18	Connacht 10	Ulster (68)	
2016–17	Connacht 30	Ulster 25	Connacht (14)	
2016–17	Ulster 23	Connacht 7	Ulster (69)	
2017–18	Ulster 16	Connacht 8	Ulster (70)	
2017–18	Connacht 44	Ulster 16	Connacht (15)	Highest margin of victory for Connacht
2018–19	Ulster 15	Connacht 22	Connacht (16)	
2018–19	Connacht 21	Ulster 12	Connacht (17)	
2018–19	Ulster 21	Connacht 13	Ulster (71)	
2019–20	Ulster 35	Connacht 3	Ulster (72)	
2019–20	Connacht 26	Ulster 20	Connacht (18)	
2020–21	Connacht 19	Ulster 32	Ulster (73)	
2020–21	Ulster 24	Connacht 26	Connacht (19)	Rainbow Cup fixture
2021–22	Connacht 36	Ulster 11	Connacht (20)	Connacht chose the Aviva Stadium in Dublin as its home venue for the match
2021–22	Ulster 32	Connacht 12	Ulster (74)	
2022–23	Ulster 36	Connacht 10	Ulster (75)	
2022–23	Connacht 20	Ulster 22	Ulster (76)	
2022–23	Ulster 10	Connacht 15	Connacht (21)	URC quarter-final
2023–24	Connacht 22	Ulster 20	Connacht (22)	
2023–24	Ulster 20	Connacht 19	Ulster (77)	
2024–25	Ulster 32	Connacht 27	Ulster (78)	
2024–25	Connacht 7	Ulster 17	Ulster (79)	
2025–26	Connacht 24	Ulster 29	Ulster (80)	
2025–26	Ulster 19	Connacht 26	Connacht (23)	

== See also ==
- History of rugby union matches between Leinster and Munster
- History of rugby union matches between Leinster and Ulster
- History of rugby union matches between Leinster and Connacht
- History of rugby union matches between Munster and Connacht
- History of rugby union matches between Munster and Ulster
- IRFU Interprovincial Championship
