= History of rugby union matches between Leinster and Ulster =

Leinster versus Ulster is the oldest fixture in Irish rugby, with the first ever interprovincial match taking place between the sides in 1875. As such, a healthy rivalry has developed between the two provincial rivals.

Both provinces combined to provide the squad for the Irish international representative side from the first international match in 1875 until the IRFU was formally founded in 1879, consisting of the formal founding of the Leinster and Ulster branches and the addition of a third provincial side, the Munster branch. Finally a Connacht branch was added in 1885 to complete representation for all four provinces of Ireland.

The Interprovincial Championship did not formally begin until the 1946–47 season. Since then, Leinster and Ulster have played in many high profile games, including League and European Cup finals, with Leinster getting the upper hand on the big occasions thus far.

== Overall Summary of Games Since 1946 ==
Details	Played	Won by Leinster	Won by Ulster	Drawn
Leinster Home	61	45	15	1
Ulster Home	54	26	23	5
Neutral Venue	1	1	0	0
Overall	116	72	38	6

== Statistics ==
Record	Leinster	Ulster
Longest winning streak	9 (1975/76-1983/84)	9 (1984/85-1992/93)
Largest points for
Home	54 (2019–2020)	30 (2015–2016)
Away	39 (1980–1981)	42 (2019–2020)
Largest winning margin
Home	33 (40–7; 2019–2020)	24 (30–6; 2015–2016)
Away	30 (9–39; 1980–1981)	20 (14–34; 1998–1999)
Largest aggregate score
96 (Leinster 54 Ulster 42; 2019–2020)
Lowest aggregate score
0 (Leinster 0 Ulster 0; 1947–1948)
Highest attendance
81,774 (European Cup Final, Twickenham Stadium, May 2012)

== Results ==
Season	Home	Away	Winner	Note(s)
1946/47	Ulster 16	Leinster 8	Ulster (1)	
1947/48	Leinster 0	Ulster 0	Draw (1)	
1948/49	Ulster 0	Leinster 8	Leinster (1)	
1949/50	Leinster 8	Ulster 0	Leinster (2)	
1950/51	Ulster 10	Leinster 3	Ulster (2)	
1951/52	Leinster 14	Ulster 17	Ulster (3)	
1952/53	Ulster 3	Leinster 5	Leinster (3)	
1953/54	Leinster 0	Ulster 3	Ulster (4)	
1954/55	Ulster 3	Leinster 5	Leinster (4)	
1955/56	Leinster 6	Ulster 21	Ulster (5)	
1956/57	Ulster 17	Leinster 8	Ulster (6)	
1957/58	Leinster 13	Ulster 24	Ulster (7)	
1958/59	Ulster 12	Leinster 16	Leinster (5)	
1959/60	Leinster 16	Ulster 6	Leinster (6)	
1960/61	Ulster 9	Leinster 9	Draw (2)	
1961/62	Leinster 8	Ulster 3	Leinster (7)	
1962/63	Ulster 11	Leinster 8	Ulster (8)	
1963/64	Leinster 12	Ulster 8	Leinster (8)	
1964/65	Ulster 8	Leinster 8	Draw (3)	
1965/66	Leinster 8	Ulster 6	Leinster (9)	
1966/67	Ulster 8	Leinster 6	Ulster (9)	
1967/68	Leinster 5	Ulster 9	Ulster (10)	
1968/69	Ulster 14	Leinster 8	Ulster (11)	
1969/70	Leinster 3	Ulster 8	Ulster (12)	
1970/71	Ulster 6	Leinster 3	Ulster (13)	
1971/72	Leinster 12	Ulster 10	Leinster (10)	
1972/73	Ulster 6	Leinster 11	Leinster (11)	
1973/74	Leinster 20	Ulster 13	Leinster (12)	
1974/75	Ulster 22	Leinster 9	Ulster (14)	
1975/76	Leinster 16	Ulster 9	Leinster (13)	
1976/77	Ulster 6	Leinster 12	Leinster (14)	
1977/78	Leinster 29	Ulster 18	Leinster (15)	
1978/79	Ulster 3	Leinster 9	Leinster (16)	
1979/80	Leinster 18	Ulster 12	Leinster (17)	
1980/81	Ulster 9	Leinster 39	Leinster (18)	
1981/82	Leinster 19	Ulster 6	Leinster (19)	
1982/83	Ulster 9	Leinster 15	Leinster (20)	
1983/84	Leinster 20	Ulster 16	Leinster (21)	
1984/85	Ulster 16	Leinster 3	Ulster (15)	
1985/86	Leinster 13	Ulster 19	Ulster (16)	
1986/87	Ulster 14	Leinster 12	Ulster (17)	
1987/88	Leinster 22	Ulster 29	Ulster (18)	
1988/89	Ulster 18	Leinster 17	Ulster (19)	
1989/90	Leinster 6	Ulster 14	Ulster (20)	
1990/91	Ulster 13	Leinster 6	Ulster (21)	
1991/92	Leinster 21	Ulster 22	Ulster (22)	
1992/93	Ulster 12	Leinster 8	Ulster (23)	
1993/94	Leinster 25	Ulster 0	Leinster (22)	
1994/95	Ulster 6	Leinster 12	Leinster (23)	
1995/96	Leinster 31	Ulster 3	Leinster (24)	
1996/97	Ulster 25	Leinster 35	Leinster (25)	
1997/98	Leinster 26	Ulster 25	Leinster (26)	
1998/99	Leinster 14	Ulster 34	Ulster (24)	
1998/99	Ulster 11	Leinster 35	Leinster (27)	
1999/00	Leinster 15	Ulster 26	Ulster (25)	
1999/00	Ulster 22	Leinster 23	Leinster (28)	
2000/01	Leinster 19	Ulster 6	Leinster (29)	
2000/01	Ulster 26	Leinster 13	Ulster (26)	
2001/02	Leinster 31	Ulster 9	Leinster (30)	
2002/03	N/A	N/A	N/A	No Fixture
2003/04	Ulster 23	Leinster 23	Draw (4)	
2003/04	Leinster 32	Ulster 30	Leinster (31)	
2003/04	Ulster 28	Leinster 6	Ulster (27)	
2004/05	Ulster 15	Leinster 26	Leinster (32)	
2004/05	Leinster 9	Ulster 8	Leinster (33)	
2005/06	Leinster 30	Ulster 23	Leinster (34)	
2005/06	Ulster 19	Leinster 24	Leinster (35)	
2006/07	Ulster 6	Leinster 6	Draw (5)	
2006/07	Leinster 20	Ulster 12	Leinster (36)	
2007/08	Ulster 16	Leinster 16	Draw (6)	
2007/08	Leinster 29	Ulster 0	Leinster (37)	
2008/09	Ulster 13	Leinster 21	Leinster (38)	
2008/09	Leinster 32	Ulster 6	Leinster (39)	
2009/10	Ulster 16	Leinster 14	Ulster (28)	
2009/10	Leinster 15	Ulster 3	Leinster (40)	
2010/11	Ulster 13	Leinster 30	Leinster (41)	
2010/11	Leinster 34	Ulster 26	Leinster (42)	
2010/11	Leinster 18	Ulster 3	Leinster (43)	
2011/12	Leinster 42	Ulster 13	Leinster (44)	
2011/12	Ulster 8	Leinster 16	Leinster (45)	
2011/12	Leinster 42	Ulster 14	Leinster (46)	European Cup Final Neutral Venue (Twickenham Stadium) Highest Attendance (81,774)
2012/13	Ulster 27	Leinster 19	Ulster (29)	
2012/13	Leinster 18	Ulster 22	Ulster (30)	
2012/13	Ulster 18	Leinster 24	Leinster (47)	
2013/14	Leinster 19	Ulster 6	Leinster (48)	
2013/14	Ulster 20	Leinster 22	Leinster (49)	
2013/14	Leinster 13	Ulster 9	Leinster (50)	
2014/15	Leinster 24	Ulster 11	Leinster (51)	
2014/15	Ulster 26	Leinster 10	Ulster (31)	
2015/16	Leinster 8	Ulster 3	Leinster (52)	
2015/16	Ulster 30	Leinster 6	Ulster (32)	
2015/16	Leinster 30	Ulster 18	Leinster (53)	
2016/17	Leinster 22	Ulster 7	Leinster (54)	
2016/17	Ulster 17	Leinster 13	Ulster (33)	
2017/18	Ulster 10	Leinster 25	Leinster (55)	
2017/18	Leinster 38	Ulster 7	Leinster (56)	
2018/19	Leinster 40	Ulster 7	Leinster (57)	
2018/19	Leinster 21	Ulster 18	Leinster (58)	European Cup Quarter-Final
2018/19	Ulster 14	Leinster 13	Ulster (34)	
2019/20	Leinster 54	Ulster 42	Leinster (59)	
2019/20	Ulster 10	Leinster 28	Leinster (60)	Ulster home match played at the Aviva stadium due to COVID-19 pandemic
2019/20	Leinster 27	Ulster 5	Leinster (61)	2020 Pro14 Grand Final
2020/21	Leinster 24	Ulster 12	Leinster (62)	
2020/21	Ulster 19	Leinster 38	Leinster (63)	
2020/21	Leinster 21	Ulster 17	Leinster (64)	Rainbow Cup fixture
2021/22	Leinster 10	Ulster 20	Ulster (35)	
2021/22	Ulster 18	Leinster 13	Ulster (36)	
2022/23	Ulster 13	Leinster 20	Leinster (65)	
2022/23	Leinster 38	Ulster 29	Leinster (66)	
2022/23	Leinster 30	Ulster 15	Leinster (67)	Champions Cup round of 16
2023/24	Leinster 21	Ulster 22	Ulster (37)	
2023/24	Ulster 23	Leinster 21	Ulster (38)	
2023/24	Leinster 43	Ulster 20	Leinster (68)	United Rugby Championship quarter-final
2024/25	Ulster 20	Leinster 27	Leinster (69)	
2024/25	Leinster 41	Ulster 17	Leinster (70)	
2025/26	Leinster 24	Ulster 20	Leinster (71)	
2025/26	Ulster 21	Leinster 29	Leinster (72)	

== See also ==
- History of rugby union matches between Connacht and Ulster
- History of rugby union matches between Leinster and Munster
- History of rugby union matches between Leinster and Connacht
- History of rugby union matches between Munster and Ulster
- IRFU Interprovincial Championship
