= 2007–08 European Challenge Cup pool stage =

- Season: 2007–08 European Challenge Cup
- Date: 8 November 2007 – 20 January 2008

Qualifiers
- Seed 1: (England) Worcester Warriors
- Seed 2: (England) Bath
- Seed 3: (England) Sale Sharks
- Seed 4: (England) Newcastle Falcons
- Seed 5: (France) Castres Olympique
- Seed 6: (France) Brive
- Seed 7: (England) Leeds Carnegie
- Seed 8: (France) Montpellier

The 2007–08 European Challenge Cup pool stage was the opening stage of the 12th season of the European Challenge Cup, the second-tier competition for European rugby union clubs. It began on 8 November 2007 when Sale Sharks hosted Montpellier and ended with the Newcastle Falcons / El Salvador game on 20 January 2008.

Twenty teams participated in this phase of the competition; they were divided into five pools of four teams each, with each team playing the others home and away. Competition points were earned using the standard bonus point system. The five pool winners and the best three runners-up advanced to the knockout stage. These teams then competed in a single-elimination tournament that ended with the final at Kingsholm Stadium in Gloucester on 25 May 2008.

== Results ==
All times are local to the game location.

Key to colours
Winner of each pool, advance to quarterfinals. Seed # in parentheses
Three highest-scoring second-place teams advance to quarterfinals. Seed # in parentheses

=== Pool 1 ===
Team	P	W	D	L	Tries for	Tries against	Try diff	Points for	Points against	Points diff	TB	LB	Pts
(England) Bath Rugby (2)	6	6	0	0	28	6	+22	203	65	+138	5	0	29
(France) Auch	6	3	0	3	11	19	−8	109	147	−38	1	1	14
(France) Albi	6	2	0	4	15	21	−6	130	177	−47	1	2	11
(Italy) Overmach Parma	6	1	0	5	10	18	−8	104	157	−53	0	3	7

10 November 2007
15:00

Rugby Parma FC (Italy)	23–28	(France) Albi

Sergio Lanfranchi
Attendance: 4,000

10 November 2007
20:45

Auch (France)	6–28	(England) Bath

Stade Patrice Brocas
Attendance: 3,562

17 November 2007
14:15

Bath (England)	28–0	(Italy) Rugby Parma FC

Recreation Ground
Attendance: 10,025

17 November 2007
19:30

Albi (France)	30–31	(France) Auch

La Maison des Sports
Attendance: 4,767

7 December 2007
19:00

Albi (France)	18–26	(England) Bath

La Maison des Sports
Attendance: 4,000

8 December 2007
15:00

Rugby Parma FC (Italy)	25–20	(France) Auch

Sergio Lanfranchi
Attendance: 530

15 December 2007
14:15

Bath (England)	59–15	(France) Albi

Recreation Ground
Attendance: 9,282

15 December 2007
18:30

Auch (France)	24–20	(Italy) Rugby Parma FC

Stade Patrice Brocas
Attendance: 1,500

12 January 2008
15:00

Rugby Parma FC (Italy)	13–31	(England) Bath

Sergio Lanfranchi
Attendance: 1,000

12 January 2008
17:30

Auch (France)	15–13	(France) Albi

Stade Patrice Brocas
Attendance: 3,000

19 January 2008
14:15

Bath (England)	31–13	(France) Auch

Recreation Ground
Attendance: 9,484

19 January 2008
19:30

Albi (France)	26–23	(Italy) Rugby Parma FC

La Maison des Sports
Attendance: 4,200

=== Pool 2 ===
Team	P	W	D	L	Tries for	Tries against	Try diff	Points for	Points against	Points diff	TB	LB	Pts
(England) Worcester Warriors (1)	6	6	0	0	36	6	+30	245	49	+196	5	0	29
(France) Montauban	6	3	0	3	28	12	+16	175	113	+62	3	1	16
(Romania) București	6	2	1	3	7	22	−15	77	158	−81	0	0	10
(Italy) Gran Parma	6	0	1	5	7	38	−31	82	259	−177	0	1	3

9 November 2007
18:30

Montauban (France)	65–6	(Italy) Gran Parma

Stade de Sapiac
Attendance: 3,000

10 November 2007
14:00

București (Romania)	8–18	(England) Worcester Warriors

Arcul de Triumf
Attendance: 800

17 November 2007
15:00

Gran Parma (Italy)	23–23	(Romania) București

Sergio Lanfranchi
Attendance: 220

17 November 2007
15:00

Worcester Warriors (England)	41–18	(France) Montauban

Sixways Stadium
Attendance: 6,876

8 December 2007
13:00

București (Romania)	19–17	(France) Montauban

Bucharest
Attendance: 1,000

8 December 2007
15:00

Worcester Warriors (England)	50–0	(Italy) Gran Parma

Sixways Stadium
Attendance: 7,169

14 December 2007
18:30

Montauban (France)	34–6	(Romania) București

Stade de Sapiac
Attendance: 2,500

15 December 2007
15:00

Gran Parma (Italy)	16–66	(England) Worcester Warriors

Sergio Lanfranchi
Attendance: 520

11 January 2008
18:30

Montauban (France)	7–24	(England) Worcester Warriors

Stade de Sapiac
Attendance: 2,000

13 January 2008
14:30

București (Romania)	21–20	(Italy) Gran Parma

Sergio Lanfranchi
Attendance: 250

19 January 2008
15:00

Gran Parma (Italy)	17–34	(France) Montauban

Sergio Lanfranchi
Attendance: 300

19 January 2008
15:00

Worcester Warriors (England)	46–0	(Romania) București

Sixways Stadium
Attendance: 6,380

=== Pool 3 ===
Team	P	W	D	L	Tries for	Tries against	Try diff	Points for	Points against	Points diff	TB	LB	Pts
(England) Newcastle Falcons (4)	6	5	0	1	34	3	+31	264	57	+207	3	1	24
(France) Brive (6)	6	4	0	2	21	5	+16	179	73	+106	3	2	20
(Ireland) Connacht	6	3	0	3	25	10	+15	172	97	+75	2	1	15
(Spain) El Salvador	6	0	0	6	3	65	−62	26	414	−388	0	0	0

9 November 2007
19:30

Brive (France)	15–6	(Ireland) Connacht

Stadium Municipal, Brive
Attendance: 4,850

10 November 2007
16:30

El Salvador (Spain)	10–71	(England) Newcastle Falcons

Campo de Pepe Rojo
Attendance: 4,000

15 November 2007
19:45

Newcastle Falcons (England)	25–19	(France) Brive

Kingston Park
Attendance: 5,140

16 November 2007
18:30

Connacht (Ireland)	75–8	(Spain) El Salvador

Sportsground
Attendance: 1,943

7 December 2007
18:30

Connacht (Ireland)	16–13	(England) Newcastle Falcons

Sportsground
Attendance: 2,856

9 December 2007
15:00

Brive (France)	71–0	(Spain) El Salvador

Stadium Municipal, Brive
Attendance: 2,000

16 December 2007
12:30

El Salvador (Spain)	8–40	(France) Brive

Campo de Pepe Rojo
Attendance: 3,000

16 December 2007
15:00

Newcastle Falcons (England)	39–0	(Ireland) Connacht

Kingston Park
Attendance: 7,426

11 January 2008
19:00

Brive (France)	12–19	(England) Newcastle Falcons

Stadium Municipal, Brive
Attendance: 7,500

13 January 2008
12:30

El Salvador (Spain)	0–60	(Ireland) Connacht

Campo de Pepe Rojo
Attendance: 3,500

18 January 2008
18:30

Connacht (Ireland)	15–22	(France) Brive

Sportsground
Attendance: 3,544

20 January 2008
15:00

Newcastle Falcons (England)	97–0	(Spain) El Salvador

Kingston Park
Attendance: 4,872

=== Pool 4 ===
Team	P	W	D	L	Tries for	Tries against	Try diff	Points for	Points against	Points diff	TB	LB	Pts
(England) Sale Sharks (3)	6	5	1	0	34	8	+26	244	62	+182	5	0	27
(France) Montpellier (8)	6	4	1	1	12	14	−2	114	115	−1	1	0	19
(France) Bayonne	6	1	0	5	16	20	−4	100	164	−64	2	2	8
(Italy) Petrarca Padova	6	1	0	5	7	27	−20	73	190	−117	0	1	5

8 November 2007
19:45

Sale Sharks (England)	49–6	(France) Montpellier

Edgeley Park
Attendance: 6,606

9 November 2007
19:30

Bayonne (France)	37–20	(Italy) Petrarca Padova

Stade Jean Dauger
Attendance: 6,000

17 November 2007
15:00

Petrarca Padova (Italy)	14–53	(England) Sale Sharks

Stadio Plebiscito
Attendance: 2,850

17 November 2007
20:45

Montpellier (France)	18–12	(France) Bayonne

Stade Yves du Manoir, Montpell
Attendance: 5,000

8 December 2007
15:00

Petrarca Padova (Italy)	13–19	(France) Montpellier

Stadio Plebiscito
Attendance: 1,000

8 December 2007
20:45

Bayonne (France)	12–51	(England) Sale Sharks

Stade Jean Dauger
Attendance: 8,000

13 December 2007
19:45

Sale Sharks (England)	32–10	(France) Bayonne

Edgeley Park
Attendance: 7,285

14 December 2007
19:30

Montpellier (France)	31–3	(Italy) Petrarca Padova

Stade Yves du Manoir, Montpell
Attendance: 4,200

11 January 2008
19:45

Sale Sharks (England)	45–6	(Italy) Petrarca Padova

Edgeley Park
Attendance: 6,708

12 January 2008
20:45

Bayonne (France)	24–26	(France) Montpellier

Stade Jean Dauger
Attendance: 4,000

19 January 2008
15:00

Petrarca Padova (Italy)	17–5	(France) Bayonne

Stadio Plebiscito
Attendance: 900

19 January 2008
20:45

Montpellier (France)	14–14	(England) Sale Sharks

Stade Yves du Manoir, Montpell
Attendance: 12,250

=== Pool 5 ===
Team	P	W	D	L	Tries for	Tries against	Try diff	Points for	Points against	Points diff	TB	LB	Pts
(France) Castres Olympique (5)	6	5	0	1	19	12	+7	160	105	+55	1	0	21
(England) Leeds Carnegie (7)	6	4	0	2	18	10	+8	157	101	+56	2	1	19
(Italy) Calvisano	6	2	0	4	13	29	−16	123	200	−77	1	0	9
(France) Dax	6	1	0	5	15	14	+1	109	143	−34	1	3	7

9 November 2007
20:00

Leeds Carnegie (England)	35–18	(France) Castres

Headingley Stadium
Attendance: 2,138

11 November 2007
15:00

Calvisano (Italy)	54–19	(France) Dax

Centro Sportivo San Michele
Attendance: 1,600

16 November 2007
20:00

Dax (France)	20–23	(England) Leeds Carnegie

Stade Maurice Boyau
Attendance: 4,000

17 November 2007
18:00

Castres (France)	61–28	(Italy) Calvisano

Stade Pierre Antoine
Attendance: 6,000

8 December 2007
16:00

Castres (France)	25–15	(France) Dax

Stade Pierre Antoine
Attendance: 5,400

9 December 2007
15:00

Leeds Carnegie (England)	45–5	(Italy) Calvisano

Headingley Stadium
Attendance: 2,107

15 December 2007
20:45

Dax (France)	15–16	(France) Castres

Stade Maurice Boyau
Attendance: 3,500

16 December 2007
15:00

Calvisano (Italy)	27–26	(England) Leeds Carnegie

Centro Sportivo San Michele
Attendance: 1,500

11 January 2008
20:00

Leeds Carnegie (England)	25–18	(France) Dax

Headingley Stadium
Attendance: 2,011

12 January 2008
15:00

Calvisano (Italy)	9–27	(France) Castres

Centro Sportivo San Michele
Attendance: 1,500

17 January 2008
20:45

Castres (France)	13–3	(England) Leeds Carnegie

Stade Pierre Antoine
Attendance: 6,800

18 January 2008
19:00

Dax (France)	22–0	(Italy) Calvisano

Stade Maurice Boyau
Attendance: 2,000

== Seeding and runners-up ==
Seed	Pool Winners	Pts	TF	+/-
1	(England) Worcester Warriors	29	36	+196
2	(England) Bath	29	28	+138
3	(England) Sale Sharks	27	34	+182
4	(England) Newcastle Falcons	24	34	+207
5	(France) Castres Olympique	21	19	+55
Seed	Pool Runners-up	Pts	TF	+/-
6	(France) Brive	20	21	+106
7	(England) Leeds Carnegie	19	18	+56
8	(France) Montpellier	19	12	−1
–	(France) Montauban	16	28	+62
–	(France) Auch	14	11	−38

== See also ==
- European Challenge Cup
- 2007–08 Heineken Cup
