= Connacht Rugby =

Irish rugby union team, based in Galway, Ireland

(Ireland) Connacht Rugby
- Nickname: The Westerners
- Founded: 1885; 141 years ago
- Location: Galway, Ireland
- Ground: Galway Greyhound Stadium (Capacity: 12,000)
- CEO: Willie Ruane
- Coach: Stuart Lancaster
- Captain: Cian Prendergast
- Most appearances: John Muldoon (327)
- Top scorer: Jack Carty (1,278)
- Most tries: Matt Healy (58)
- League: United Rugby Championship
- 2023–24: 11th (Irish Shield: 4th)
| 1st kit | 2nd kit |

Official website
- www.connachtrugby.ie
- Current season

Connacht Rugby is one of the four professional provincial men's rugby teams from the island of Ireland, based in Galway. Connacht competes in the United Rugby Championship and the Champions Cup. The team represents the IRFU Connacht Branch, which is one of four primary branches of the Irish Rugby Football Union (IRFU), and is responsible for rugby union throughout the geographical Irish province of Connacht.

Connacht plays its home games at Galway Greyhound Stadium, which holds 12,000 following a redevelopment. The stadium serves as a dual purpose venue which hosts popular greyhound meetings each week. Connacht play in a predominantly green jersey, shorts and socks. The Connacht Rugby crest is a modified version of the provincial flag of Connacht and consists of a dimidiated eagle and an arm wielding a sword.

With the province containing just over 8% of the total Irish population, Connacht has a much smaller base of rugby union players to choose from than the other three provinces. This player base is also affected by the relative popularity of Gaelic Athletic Association sports such as hurling and Gaelic football. In the early years of professionalism, it was suggested that the Connacht team as a professional entity should be wound up, and fans had to demonstrate to save the province. However, rugby union in Connacht has expanded significantly with increased ticket sales and stadium expansion, in particular since its first season competing in the Heineken Cup.

Through the efforts of the Connacht Branch and the support of the IRFU, the province has experienced growth, increasing its underage and schools participation through initiatives such as the Grassroots to Greenshirts campaign. Connacht enjoyed their most significant senior success in 2016, when they defeated fellow Irish province Leinster in the 2016 Pro12 Grand Final to win the competition for the first time. In 2025, while their home stadium in Galway, The Sportsground, was partly closed for expansion works, Connacht agreed to move one URC match against Munster to MacHale Park, a 25,000 seat Gaelic Athletic Association stadium in Castlebar, County Mayo. The match sold out in the space of two days and became the largest home attendance for a Connacht Rugby game in history.

While the senior men's team is most commonly associated with the Connacht Rugby brand, the province also organises a developmental 'A; side, which plays under a modified version of the brand. Before the creation of the Celtic Cup, the Connacht Eagles competed in the British and Irish Cup.

The provincial union also supports a senior women's team under the same Connacht Rugby branding, which takes part in the IRFU Women's Inter-Provincial Series and the Celtic Challenge under a combined Clovers branding with Munster Rugby.

== History ==
=== Foundation and amateur era (1885–1995) ===
The Connacht Branch of the Irish Rugby Football Union was founded on 8 December 1885, and along with it the provincial team. The branch was formed to compete with the Leinster, Munster and Ulster branches, which were founded in 1879, and whose teams had been formed in 1875. There were six teams represented at the meeting in Dublin that founded the Connacht Branch. These were Ballinasloe, Castlebar, Galway Town, Galway Grammar School, Queen's College Galway and Ranelagh School Athlone. Galway Grammar and Ranelagh have both closed since, while Galwegians was formed out of Galway Town in 1922. Ballinasloe merged with Athlone to form Buccaneers in 1994, but has since been reestablished as an independent club. Castlebar and Queen's College (now NUI Galway) are the only two founding clubs to have remained active without interruption since the branch was founded. The province is currently made up of 25 senior clubs.

Cape Town-born Henry Anderson was the first Connacht player to receive an Ireland cap, making his debut against England on 14 February 1903. Anderson later went on to be one of the founders of Galwegians, and became the first Connacht branch representative to serve as president of the Irish Rugby Football Union (IRFU). Sligo-born Aengus McMorrow followed in his footsteps to become the first Connacht native player to represent Ireland in 1951. Ballinasloe man Ray McLoughlin was the first Connacht player to captain Ireland, when he led the team in the 1965 Five Nations Championship. McLoughlin also became the first Connacht representative for the Lions when he took part in the 1966 tour to Australia and New Zealand, though he was playing his club rugby for Gosforth in England at the time. Ciaran Fitzgerald became the first Connacht man to captain the Lions when he was chosen by Jim Telfer to lead the 1983 tour to New Zealand.

During the amateur era Irish players primarily played for their respective clubs, with provincial games effectively treated as Irish trial matches. The provincial teams were also used to provide competitive club opposition for touring international sides. Beginning in the 1946–47 season, the provinces played against each other in the annual IRFU Interprovincial Rugby Championship. This was a round-robin tournament which, during the amateur era, consisted of one game against each opponent. In the 1980s, to compensate for Connacht's smaller playing base, the IRFU decreed that any English-born Irish international players must represent Connacht in the Championship. However, towards the end of the amateur era in the 1990s, this edict was reversed with the Championship also contested by the Irish Exiles team, consisting of Irish-qualified players in Britain and France. Connacht won the tournament on three occasions, in 1956, 1957 and 1965, although on each occasion the title was shared.

=== Early professional years (1995–2003) ===
Map of the IRFU provincial branches

On 26 August 1995 the International Rugby Board declared rugby union an "open" game, removing all restrictions on payments or benefits to those connected with the game. this was done due to a committee conclusion having an open game was the only way to end the hypocrisy of shamateurism, and keep control of the sport. The threat to amateur rugby union mostly prevalent in the Southern hemisphere, particularly in Australia, where Super League was threatening to entice players to rugby league with large salaries. In Ireland, the four provincial teams were the only teams to go professional, while their constituent clubs remained amateur.

The 1995–96 season saw the first ever Heineken Cup, a new tournament set up for European clubs. The Irish were allocated three places in the competition, with these places going to Leinster, Munster and Ulster. The following season saw the launch of a secondary European competition, the European Challenge Cup. Connacht were coached that season by former All Black Warren Gatland, who had previously coached Galwegians. The inaugural Challenge Cup, then also known as the European Shield, saw Connacht finish fourth from six teams in their group, which also contained Toulon and the Northampton Saints.

The 1997–98 Challenge Cup proved far more successful for Connacht. The team, still coached by Gatland, finished top of their group; the number of teams in each group having been reduced to four. Connacht won five of their six matches including beating Northampton both at home and away. The win in Northampton and victory over Bordeaux-Bègles in Stade André Moga made Connacht the first professional Irish team to beat an English team in England and a French team in France respectively. In the quarter-final they played SU Agen away in the Stade Armandie, but lost 40–27. Gatland left his position as Connacht coach at the end of the season, taking over as Ireland coach.

Another New Zealander, Glenn Ross, took over from Gatland. In his two seasons, Connacht failed to make it out of the pool stages of the Challenge Cup, and Ross resigned at the end of the 1999–2000 season. He was replaced by South African coach Steph Nel. Nel's initial two seasons also saw Connacht knocked out of the Challenge Cup during the group stages. 2001 saw the formation of a new competition called the Celtic League, which was created to serve as a championship for Irish, Scottish and Welsh clubs. Connacht made it to the quarter-finals in the inaugural season, where they were beaten by Scotland's Glasgow Warriors, by a final score of 29–34. In the 2002–03 season the team again reached the quarters. This time, however, they were beaten by a much greater margin, losing to Irish rivals Munster by a score of 33–3. Meanwhile, in the 2002–03 European Challenge Cup, they reached the quarter-finals, being knocked out by a margin of 8 points over two legs, against Welsh team Pontypridd.

Off the field, however, the province's future was under threat. The IRFU proposed shutting down Connacht Rugby as a professional team in 2003 to cut costs, in light of the IRFU's annual deficit of €4 million. This was averted when a public protest with 2,000 fans marching on the IRFU headquarters in Dublin, coupled with the possibility of a strike by the Irish Rugby Union Players Association, forced the IRFU to reverse course and maintain the team.

=== Michael Bradley era (2003–2010) ===
Michael Bradley took charge of Connacht in 2003, coming in from the Irish under-age set up to replace Steph Nel. Connacht Rugby's average crowd was 600 supporters and the IRFU allotted a budget which was less than 50% of either of the other three Irish provinces. In Bradley's first Celtic League season, Connacht finished ninth from 12 teams, ahead of only the Scottish sides, but 2003–04 was the most successful season in European competition in the province's history to date. Connacht reached the semi-finals of that year's European Challenge Cup, and came within touching distance of the decider, but a try from the Harlequins centre Will Greenwood, 12 minutes from time in the second leg of their semi-final, denied them a place in the final. Connacht also got to the semi-final of the Celtic Cup. Despite this, Connacht fell further in the Celtic League the following season. The team finished one place from the bottom in 2004–05, in what was now an 11 team competition. Still, the team continued their European form in the 2004–05 European Challenge Cup, reaching the semi-finals a second season. Once again, they were knocked out over two legs by the eventual winners of the competition, this time Sale Sharks.

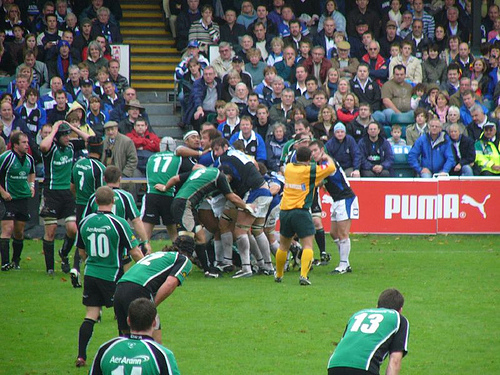
2006–07 European Challenge Cup tie between Bath and Connacht

With the Union holding a tight grip on the purse strings Connacht continued to struggle in the Celtic League, finishing in tenth place from 11 in both the 2005–06 and 2006–07 seasons. In these seasons, however their European form could not make up for the domestic performances. Though they reached the quarter-finals of the 2005–06 Challenge Cup, they suffered a 23–3 defeat to Newcastle Falcons, before failing to advance through the pool stages in 2006–07. These seasons, however, saw the beginning of a new dimension to Connacht's player recruitment, whereby the province would bring Irish players back from abroad, to compete for Irish selection. Examples include the transfers of Gavin Duffy from Harlequins, Johnny O'Connor from London Wasps and Frank Murphy from Leicester Tigers.

The 2007–08 Celtic League saw the competition reduced to ten teams, following the exit of Border Reivers, and the season ended with Connacht bottom of the table, having won only five of their 18 matches. They also finished third in their Challenge Cup pool, again being knocked out early. In the 2008–09 season Connacht were able to finish second in their pool and advance to the quarter-finals, but were beaten 42–13 by Northampton Saints. Without any meaningful increase in the budget, the management team struggled to improve the quality of the playing squad as a whole and they failed to improve in the Celtic League, finishing last again in 2008–09, this time 13 points from the next team up the table.

Bradley announced early in the 2009–10 season that he intended to step down at the end of the year. His final season followed a similar pattern to his first two seasons as coach, with the team again finishing last in the League, though the gap was narrower than the previous year. As in Bradley's earlier seasons, however, Connacht were able to leave their poor form in the league behind when it came to playing in the Challenge Cup. They topped their pool comfortably, winning all six games with two try bonus points, and proceeded to the quarter-finals as top seeds. For the first time in the club's history the team had achieved the highest points total at the pool stages of any team in either European competition. In the quarters, they faced French Top 14 side Bourgoin, beating them 23–20, with a late Miah Nikora drop goal. Connacht advanced to the semi-finals where, on 30 April 2010, they faced a Toulon team featuring the English fly-half Jonny Wilkinson. Toulon won 19–12 in Galway, with Wilkinson kicking 14 of the French club's points. This season also saw veteran forward Michael Swift break the record for number of Connacht appearances. With crowds of more than 8,000 at both the quarter and semi-final stages of the Challenge Cup, and average gates of 2,600 in the Celtic League, Connacht's structures and support had improved drastically from 2003, when the team's survival was in question. At the end of the 2010 season, Bradley was awarded the Celtic League's Chairman's Award in recognition of his seven years of service to the province.

=== Eric Elwood as head coach (2010–2013) ===
Bradley was succeeded as Connacht boss by former Connacht and Ireland fly-half, Eric Elwood. Elwood had served as an assistant to Bradley since 2005 and had also coached the Ireland Under-20s to a grand slam in 2007's Six Nations Under 20s Championship. His first season in charge saw two teams from Italy introduced to the Celtic League, Aironi and Benetton Treviso, which brought the number of teams back up to twelve. Connacht finished above both of the Italian teams as well as Glasgow Warriors, coming in ninth place. In the Challenge Cup, Connacht were knocked out in the pool stages, finishing second in their group behind the eventual winners of the tournament, Harlequins. During the course of the season, the loss of a number of key players, such as Seán Cronin and Ian Keatley, were announced, with the players signing to Connacht's provincial rivals for the start of the following season.

==== Heineken Cup qualification ====
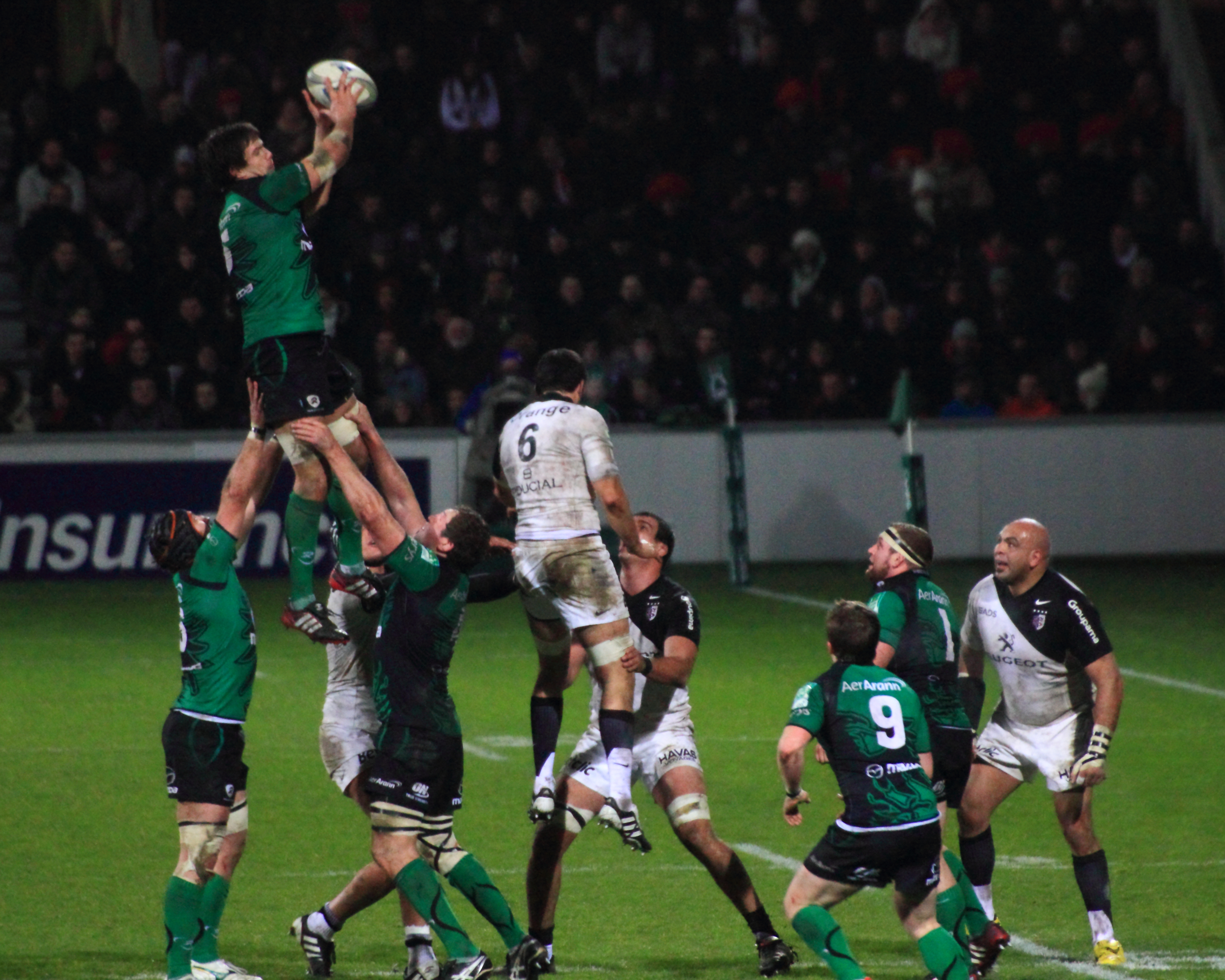
Lineout against Toulouse in their 2011–12 Heineken Cup group stage match at Stade Ernest-Wallon

In 2011–12 Connacht made their first-ever Heineken Cup appearance, due to Leinster winning the 2011 Heineken Cup Final. By competition rules, introduced in the 2010–11 season, the winners of both the Heineken Cup, and the European Challenge Cup, would receive an automatic berth in the following year's Heineken Cup. This place would then be passed on to another team from that country if the tournament winner was already qualified by domestic performance. As Leinster had qualified through performance in the 2010–11 Celtic League, Connacht claimed the extra berth.

Ahead of their first season in European Rugby's premier club competition, Gavin Duffy replaced John Muldoon as captain of the team. Connacht lost their first five matches in the pool stages, claiming losing bonuses in both of their games with Gloucester. In the final game of their pool, however, they managed an upset, beating Harlequins 9–8 in the Sportsground, which prevented the Premiership club from topping the group, and knocked them down into the Challenge Cup. On the domestic front, the Celtic League had been renamed, given the previous season's introduction of Italian teams to the competition. In the first season of the new 'Pro12', Connacht built on the previous year's performance. They finished the season eighth out of twelve teams.

Entry into the Heineken Cup led to a significant increase in the club's popularity. In summer 2011, the Connacht Clan supporters club was formed. In September 2011, Connacht season ticket sales went over the 3,000 mark for the first time in the club's history, and average attendance for the 2011–12 season saw a 105% increase over the previous season. Connacht's average attendance in home Pro12 matches climbed to 4,653 in the 2011–12 season, and increased further to 5,154 for the 2012–13 season. The following season saw the Connacht end in the same position as the previous year, as the team finished eighth in the Pro12. On the European stage, Connacht played in the Heineken Cup again in 2012–13, because of Leinster's second Heineken Cup win in a row. Connacht won three of their pool matches: two against Italian team Zebre, along with a victory at home to 2009–10 finalists Biarritz. Elwood departed at the end of the season, having announced his intention to leave in October 2012.

=== Pat Lam takes over (2013–2017) ===
Elwood's replacement was announced in January 2013, with the New Zealand born former Samoa international Pat Lam appointed to coach the team. Lam's first competitive game in charge was in the 2013–14 Pro12, a 25–16 home win over Zebre but following this game, Connacht suffered a number of league defeats in a row. On 21 December 2013, they overcame Newport Gwent Dragons 14–11 at home to break their league losing streak stretching back to September. The team went on a four match winning streak from 15 February to 23 March, earning three try bonus points in the team's longest run of wins in 11 years. Following this run of form though, Connacht failed to win another match in the league, finishing in tenth place and level on points with ninth placed Dragons. Due to Leinster's victory in the 2012–13 European Challenge Cup, Connacht again participated in the Heineken Cup, where they were drawn into Pool 3 with Saracens, Toulouse and Zebre. In the third round of pool games Connacht produced one of the biggest shocks in the history of the Heineken Cup when they defeated Toulouse in the Stade Ernest-Wallon. Despite two wins against Zebre, this wasn't enough to qualify from the pool, with the team again finishing third.

The following season brought a restructuring of games at European level, which meant Connacht returned to the second-tier competition. Connacht finished second in their pool in the 2014–15 Challenge Cup and qualified for the quarter-finals, where they were beaten by Gloucester. In the 2014–15 Pro12, Connacht enjoyed their best season since the competition changed to a round-robin format, winning a record 10 games, including home derbies against provincial rivals Leinster and Munster on their way to finishing seventh. The seventh-place finish saw Connacht entered into a play-off involving Bordeaux Bègles and Gloucester for a place in the next season's Champions Cup. Connacht played Gloucester away for the chance to face Bordeaux, and were leading 18–25 in the final minutes of the game when a penalty gave Gloucester a try-scoring opportunity and sent the match to extra time, after which Gloucester emerged 40–32 victors.

Having lost the previous season's play-off, Connacht were entered into 2015–16 Challenge Cup where they topped their pool, before being knocked out by Grenoble in the quarter-finals. In the 2015–16 Pro12 however, Connacht broke a number of records on their way to a second-place finish in the regular season. This put the team through to the end-of-year play-offs for the first time where they faced Glasgow Warriors in a semi-final in Galway, winning 16–11. On 28 May 2016, a 20–10 win against Leinster in the Pro12 final gave Connacht their first ever major trophy. The upset win drew comparisons with Premier League side Leicester City's triumph in the same season.

Connacht's Pro12 victory saw them qualify for the 2016–17 Champions Cup. They finished in third place in their pool, level on points with Toulouse in second to narrowly miss out on qualifying for the knockout stage of the competition for the first time. A serious injury crisis, which saw 21 players unavailable at the same time, contributed to the team sliding down the league table and they finished eighth in the 2016–17 Pro12. This saw the team entered into a play-off to qualify for the 2017–18 Champions Cup. A six-point loss to Northampton Saints saw Connacht entered into the Challenge Cup. This was Lam's last game in charge. It had been announced in December 2016 that he would leave at the end of the season to take over English side Bristol.

=== Post-Lam era (2017–present) ===
The assistant coach of Super Rugby side the Chiefs, Kieran Keane, was named as Pat Lam's replacement in February 2017, to take over ahead the start of the 2017–18 season. However, Keane's commitments with the Chiefs in Super Rugby kept him from linking up with Connacht fully until the end of that July. The league underwent further restructuring, with the addition of two South African teams and the division of the competition into two conferences. After a disappointing first season, in which Connacht finished second from bottom in their conference, Keane was let go one year into a three-year deal. The end of the 2017–18 season also saw the departure of long-serving player and captain John Muldoon who had made 327 appearances in his record-breaking career with the province.

Keane was replaced for the following season by Australian coach Andy Friend, who had previously been head coach of the Australian sevens team. His appointment was announced as his replacement in May 2018. Jarrad Butler, the previous season's Players' Player of the Year, was named as Muldoon's replacement in the captaincy. In Europe, Connacht again qualified for the Challenge Cup knockout stage and were again beaten in the quarter-finals, this time by Sale Sharks. However, Friend's first season in charge saw a large improvement in league performance, with Connacht climbing to third place in their conference in the 2018–19 Pro14, returning the team to the top level of European competition for the following season. The third-place finish also qualified the team for the end-of-season play-offs for the first time since 2016, where they were beaten by Ulster at the quarter-final stage.

During the 2021-22 Heineken Champions Cup, Connacht advanced to the knock-out stages for the first time following the cancellation of a final round group stage match between Toulouse and Cardiff, due positive COVID-19 tests in the Toulouse squad. Following the 2021–22 season, Friend was promoted to Director of Rugby with Senior Coach Pete Wilkins assuming the role of Head Coach.

== Status within Irish rugby ==
Connacht has historically been designated as being the weakest in the country compared to its fellow provinces. In the 1960s for example, the Irish team was picked by a committee of five, generally consisting of two representatives each from Leinster and Ulster, and one from Munster. Connacht were represented on this council by a sub-selector, without the power to vote on the final squad. Most of Connacht's international players during this era were either Irish-qualified imports from England or players who joined the side after failing to make the cut in their native province. Tom Clancy, a Connacht international player, stated that players like him had to be "twice as good as the competition to get a chance".

At the onset of the professional era, the IRFU designated Connacht as a development team, meaning the team received only half the budget of the other Irish provinces. In 2003, the IRFU discussed the future of Connacht Rugby and the prospect of the team being shut down as part of a cost-saving program. In response, thousands of supporters marched to show their support of the provincial team and this idea was subsequently rejected. In May 2014, the IRFU announced that it would be providing Connacht with an increase in funding of over €1 million, nominally to improve strength and conditioning coaching and facilities.

Although Connacht are no longer as far behind in funding, they do still have a smaller playing population compared to the other provinces. The Connacht Rugby academy under Nigel Carolan consistently produced graduates to represent the senior Connacht Rugby team, with many of these players having also represented Ireland at under-age level. Robbie Henshaw, Dave Heffernan, Denis Buckley, Eoin McKeon, Eoin Griffin, Darragh Leader, Tiernan O'Halloran and Jack Carty are examples of Connacht players native to the province to have progressed to the senior team through the academy.

In spite of the increased production line of native talent, Connacht continues to rely on its traditional policy of bringing in players from outside its jurisdiction that have failed to progress to their senior provincial team to help make up its playing numbers. Examples of this from the amateur era include Robbie McGrath and Victor Costello, both of whom went on to represent Ireland. This trend has continued in the professional era with the record-holder for points scored, Ian Keatley, and leading try-scorer Matt Healy both being from Dublin, while Munster-native players like Seán Cronin and Ultan Dillane have earned Ireland caps while playing for the team. Connacht has also tended to give opportunities to foreign-born players who qualify for Ireland through heritage. This relationship was codified by the IRFU in the 1980s when English-born players were mandated to represent Connacht in the Interprovincial Championship. In the amateur era, this saw the likes of Simon Geoghegan, John O'Driscoll and Jim Staples represent Connacht, while since the game has turned professional, the likes of Michael Swift, Mike McCarthy and Kieran Marmion have all reached over 100 caps for the team.

Connacht Rugby has in the past lost players it recruited and helped to develop to provincial rivals and foreign teams. For example, Connacht lost four important first team players to provincial rivals in 2011. The team's out-half, Ian Keatley moved to Munster, while hooker Seán Cronin, tighthead prop Jamie Hagan and winger Fionn Carr all transferred to Leinster. After the loss of another first team player to Leinster was announced in 2012, this time Irish international lock Mike McCarthy, the Connacht chief executive Tom Sears accused Leinster of trying to "poach" Connacht players, arguing it was not in the best interests of Irish rugby.

The province also has a lower representation in top-level club competition in Ireland than its rivals, due to its lower playing population. Of the 25 senior clubs currently operating in Connacht, only Ballina, Buccaneers, Galway Corinthians, Galwegians and Sligo compete in the highest level of amateur rugby in the country, the All-Ireland League.

=== European qualification ===
In the early years of European competition, Connacht were automatically entered in the European Challenge Cup each year. The IRFU were allocated three places in the more prestigious Heineken Cup, and with these going to the other provinces Connacht were left with no avenue of qualification. The Interprovincial Championship in 2000 guaranteed a spot in the following 2001–02 Heineken Cup to the top two teams, with Connacht finishing in last place. However, the advent of the Celtic League in 2001 saw this guarantee removed. The 2002–03 season saw Connacht finish ahead of Leinster in their Celtic League pool and progress to the knockout rounds ahead of the eastern province, having beaten them away in Donnybrook in the only game between the sides. Despite having finished ahead of their rivals in the table, progressed further than them in the competition and beaten them in the head-to-head game, the IRFU persisted with its policy and Leinster were entered in the 2003–04 Heineken Cup as the top Irish seeds.

The 2004–05 season saw a change to this policy, as the union began to use the Celtic League table as its sole criterion for determining which Irish teams would be entered into the following season's Heineken Cup. Connacht finished six points behind Ulster in the final standings that year, missing out again. It wasn't until 2016 that Connacht finished in a higher league position than any of their provincial rivals again. Despite this Connacht did achieve Heineken Cup qualification from the 2011–12 season to the 2013–14 season. Ironically this was thanks to Leinster, who won three consecutive European tournaments. Leinster's successes meant that they were automatically qualified for the following year, leaving an open Irish qualification berth which was filled by Connacht.

With the Heineken Cup being replaced by the 20-team European Rugby Champions Cup in the 2014–15 season, the Pro12 table gained a greater influence on qualification. Under the previous format, the competition provided a minimum of ten teams, with Scotland and Italy providing two teams each, and Ireland and Wales both providing three. The new system saw one place being reserved for the highest finishing Pro12 team from each of its four participating countries and three other qualifiers based solely on league position, for a total of seven teams. The other teams were entered in the new second-tier competition, the European Rugby Challenge Cup. This meant Connacht were no longer required to finish ahead of another Irish province or rely on an Irish victory in a European tournament to qualify for the top tier of European rugby. The 2015–16 season marked a major breakthrough for Connacht, as a second-place finish in the Pro12 table followed by victory in the grand final saw the team qualify for the top tier of European competition on their own steam for the first time.

The Pro14 underwent further changes to its European qualification process ahead of the 2017–18 season. In May 2017, the guaranteed places in the Champions for at least one team from each country in the league were scrapped, with the intention of having just the top seven teams qualify instead. The addition of two South African teams to the league saw further alterations, as the teams were split into two seven-team conferences. The highest three non-South African teams from each pool took the first six qualification spots, while the seventh team to qualify would be decided by a play-off between the fourth-ranked non-South African team from each conference.

== Stadium and supporters ==
=== Stadium ===
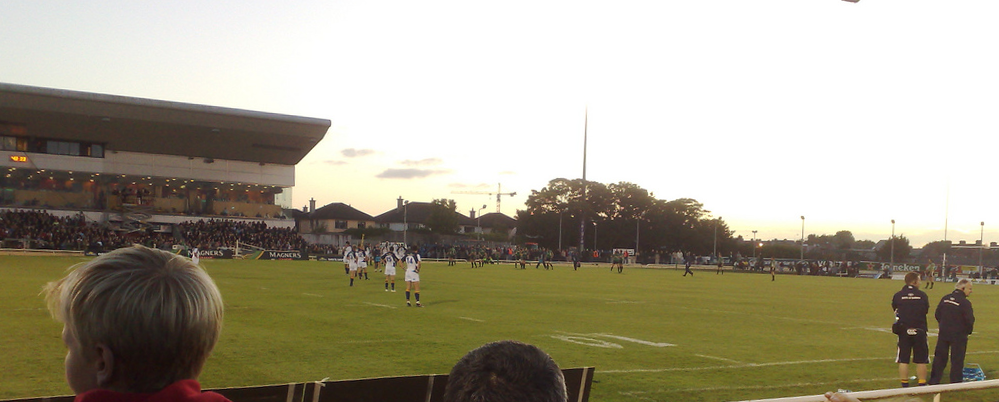
Connacht against Leinster in their 2008–09 Celtic League game at the Sportsground

The Sportsground has been the historical home of Connacht Rugby since the late 1920s. Located on the College Road and within walking distance of the city centre, it is known as a spartan and inhospitable venue for visiting teams. It is particularly notorious for its wet and windy conditions due to its location near the Atlantic coast and Galway's rainy climate. In addition to its use by Connacht, The Sportsground is also used for greyhound racing, with the track running between the playing field and the stands. The stadium is owned by The Galway Agricultural & Sports Society Ltd. who lease it to both Connacht Rugby and the Irish Greyhound Board. Due primarily to the issue of ownership, the development of The Sportsground lagged behind that of the other Irish provinces who, with the backing of the IRFU, moved ahead with major developments of their home grounds.

Following increased support for the province in the wake of improved results, particularly the 2015–16 title-winning season, the Connacht Branch stated their intention to undertake either a large scale redevelopment of The Sportsground or a move to an alternative stadium. The ultimate stated aim for the province is a stadium with a capacity of at least 10,000 spectators, that has full covering on all stands and the ability to cater for a wide variety of fans. Surveys have been taken from supporters of the team and business owners in Galway city to determine what facilities and services would be expected from a new stadium. A move to a new location would likely mean playing in a municipal stadium in Galway city, though there was a stated preference within the province's leadership to remain at The Sportsground if possible.

==== Stadium redevelopment ====
In October 2018, plans were announced for a €30 million redevelopment of The Sportsground with an expansion of the capacity to 12,000, state-of-the-art training facilities for Connacht players, new areas for greyhound racing and community facilities.

===== Phase 1 =====
On 9 June 2022, the first phase of redevelopment commenced with full excavation of the pitch at The Sportsground underway, to allow a new artificial playing surface for the following season. Other works in this first phase of the project included installing a new LED floodlight system for the pitch.

===== Phase 2 =====
Phase 2 of the redevelopment led to the construction of a modern High Performance Centre, and a new North Stand to bring the total capacity to over 12,000. The new stadium will open for its first full attendance match on 24 January 2026 with a URC game against Leinster Rugby.

===== Stadium sponsorship =====
On 19 January 2024, Connacht Rugby announced a sponsorship agreement with Dexcom Inc., a U.S. company and world-leader in producing and distributing continuous glucose monitoring (CGM) systems for the management of diabetes.

The 12-year contract sees the stadium renamed as Dexcom Greyhound Stadium for all games and promotion.

=== Supporters ===
The official supporters' club for the province is the "Connacht Clan". A voluntary organisation, it was established in 2011 and is club run by a member-elected committee. The committee is made up entirely of supporters, with the exception of one representative from the Connacht Branch, who acts as a liaison to the supporters.

The side's mascot "Eddie the Eagle" is used to promote the team to younger fans, appearing at schools and attending promotional events aimed at families.

== Crest and colours ==
The flag of the province of Connacht

The dimidiated eagle and sword arm featured in the Connacht Rugby crest is taken from the flag of the Province of Connacht. These arms are said to have been granted to Ruaidrí Ua Conchobair, the reigning King of Connacht, by the Schottenkloster, or Irish monastery, that was founded in the Bavarian city of Regensburg in the 11th century.

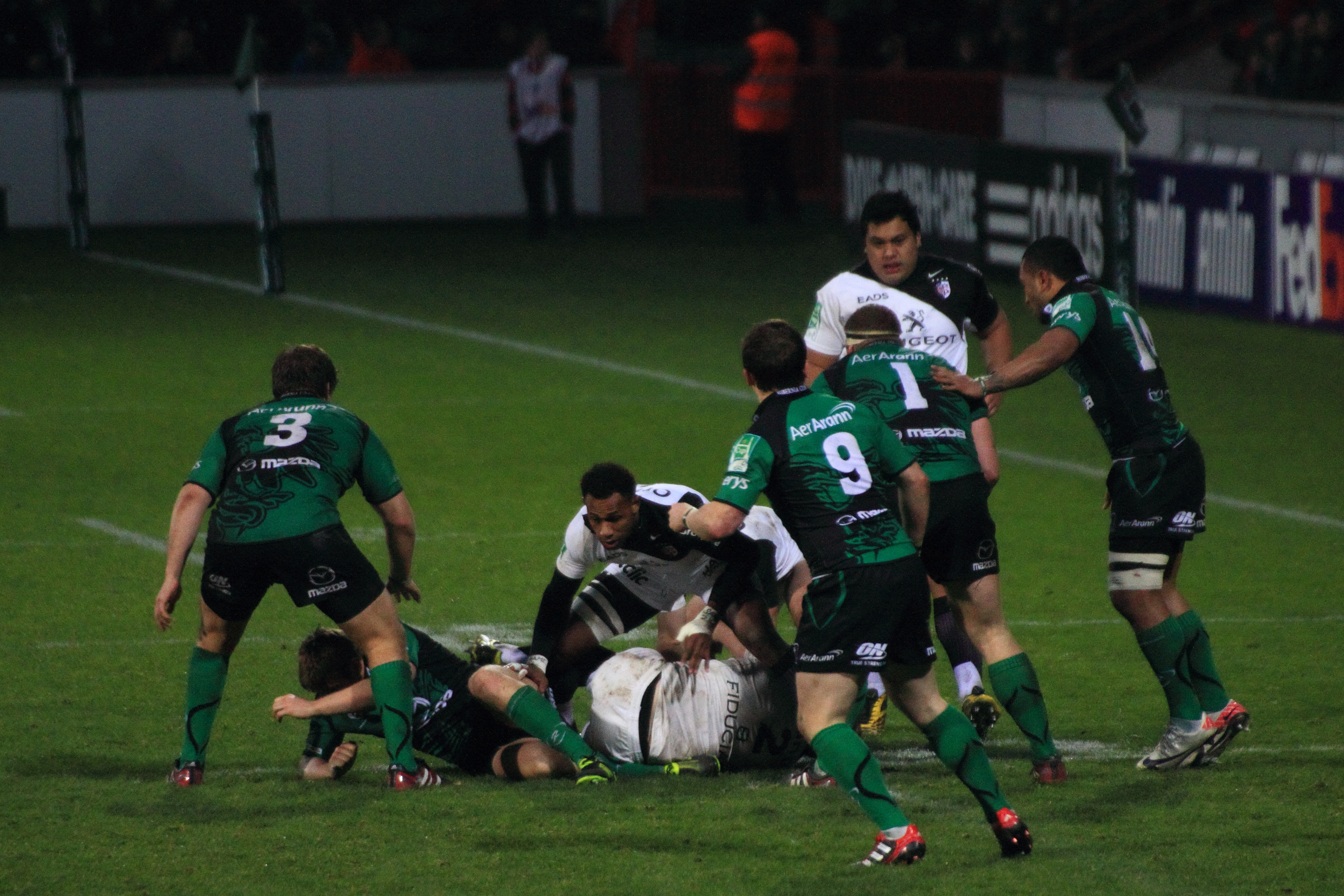
Connacht playing in green against Toulouse in the 2011–12 Heineken Cup

The current kit consists of a green and black shirt, with green shorts and green socks. The traditional colours of the Connacht province and flag are white, blue and black, with no green present. Though it is potentially related to the use of Connacht's traditional colours of white and blue by Ulster and Leinster's teams respectively, the reasons for its presence on the Connacht Rugby kit are unknown. However the green jersey has been associated with the Connacht senior team since as early as the 1950s. Connacht's second jerseys often use the province's traditional colours however. The 2019–20 European kit was primarily navy.

The current official Connacht team and support staff kit supplier is Australian manufacturer BLK sport, who announced a comprehensive four-year agreement to supply the full range of apparel for all of Connacht Rugby's representative teams and support staff in 2013. BLK continues to be the team's kit supplier as of the 2019–20 season.

Connacht's main shirt sponsors are international telecommunications company Genesys. The deal was extended and Intersport Elverys remained the title sponsor for the 2019–20 season. Other sponsors of the team include Bank of Ireland, Grant Thornton International and Corrib Oil.

== Current standings ==
=== United Rugby Championship ===
| Pos | Team | Pld | W | D | L | PF | PA | PD | TF | TA | TB | LB | Pts | Qualification |
|---|---|---|---|---|---|---|---|---|---|---|---|---|---|---|
| 1 | Glasgow Warriors | 5 | 4 | 1 | 0 | 148 | 112 | +36 | 22 | 15 | 5 | 0 | 23 | Qualification for the Champions Cup and knockout stage |
| 2 | Bulls | 5 | 4 | 0 | 1 | 214 | 106 | +108 | 31 | 15 | 4 | 1 | 21 | Qualification for the Champions Cup and knockout stage |
| 3 | Stormers | 5 | 4 | 0 | 1 | 166 | 101 | +65 | 24 | 14 | 4 | 1 | 21 | Qualification for the Champions Cup and knockout stage |
| 4 | Sharks | 5 | 4 | 0 | 1 | 140 | 107 | +33 | 20 | 16 | 3 | 0 | 19 | Qualification for the Champions Cup and knockout stage |
| 5 | Edinburgh | 5 | 4 | 0 | 1 | 123 | 95 | +28 | 17 | 12 | 3 | 0 | 19 | Qualification for the Champions Cup and knockout stage |
| 6 | Leinster | 5 | 3 | 0 | 2 | 149 | 81 | +68 | 23 | 11 | 4 | 2 | 18 | Qualification for the Champions Cup and knockout stage |
| 7 | Cardiff | 5 | 3 | 0 | 2 | 113 | 107 | +6 | 17 | 17 | 2 | 0 | 14 | Qualification for the Champions Cup and knockout stage |
| 8 | Dragons | 5 | 2 | 1 | 2 | 137 | 128 | +9 | 20 | 20 | 3 | 1 | 14 | Qualification for the Champions Cup and knockout stage |
| 9 | Ospreys | 5 | 2 | 0 | 3 | 112 | 147 | −35 | 18 | 21 | 3 | 0 | 11 | Qualification for the Challenge Cup |
| 10 | Benetton | 5 | 1 | 1 | 3 | 115 | 104 | +11 | 16 | 17 | 2 | 3 | 11 | Qualification for the Challenge Cup |
| 11 | Connacht | 5 | 2 | 0 | 3 | 109 | 161 | −52 | 18 | 24 | 2 | 0 | 10 | Qualification for the Challenge Cup |
| 12 | Munster | 5 | 1 | 1 | 3 | 93 | 113 | −20 | 12 | 17 | 2 | 2 | 10 | Qualification for the Challenge Cup |
| 13 | Lions | 5 | 2 | 0 | 3 | 107 | 162 | −55 | 15 | 25 | 1 | 0 | 9 | Qualification for the Challenge Cup |
| 14 | Scarlets | 5 | 1 | 0 | 4 | 134 | 191 | −57 | 20 | 29 | 4 | 1 | 9 | Qualification for the Challenge Cup |
| 15 | Ulster | 5 | 0 | 2 | 3 | 121 | 160 | −39 | 18 | 22 | 4 | 1 | 9 | Qualification for the Challenge Cup |
| 16 | Zebre | 5 | 0 | 0 | 5 | 93 | 199 | −106 | 14 | 30 | 2 | 0 | 2 | Qualification for the Challenge Cup |

Updated to match(es) played on 2nd November 2026. Source: UnitedRugby.com
Rules for classification: Tiebreakers for teams tied on points: 1) Number of matches won 2) The difference between points for and points against 3) The number of tries scored 4) The most points scored 5) The difference between tries for and tries against 6) The fewest red cards received 7) The fewest yellow cards received.

=== Challenge Cup ===
EPCR Challenge Cup Pool 1
| Pos | Team | Pld | W | D | L | PF | PA | PD | TF | TA | TB | LB | Pts | Qualification |
|---|---|---|---|---|---|---|---|---|---|---|---|---|---|---|
| 1 | (Ireland) Connacht (1) | 4 | 4 | 0 | 0 | 154 | 73 | +81 | 25 | 10 | 4 | 0 | 20 | Home round of 16 |
| 2 | (France) Lyon (5) | 4 | 3 | 0 | 1 | 150 | 118 | +32 | 21 | 19 | 2 | 0 | 14 | Home round of 16 |
| 3 | (France) Perpignan (8) | 4 | 2 | 1 | 1 | 100 | 92 | +8 | 12 | 14 | 1 | 0 | 11 | Home round of 16 |
| 4 | (Wales) Cardiff (16) | 4 | 1 | 0 | 3 | 91 | 98 | −7 | 13 | 13 | 2 | 1 | 7 | Away round of 16 |
| 5 | (South Africa) Cheetahs | 4 | 1 | 1 | 2 | 73 | 132 | −59 | 10 | 19 | 0 | 0 | 6 | |
| 6 | (Italy) Zebre Parma | 4 | 0 | 0 | 4 | 70 | 125 | −55 | 10 | 17 | 0 | 2 | 2 | |

Source: EPCR
Rules for classification: Tiebreakers for teams tied on points: 1) Number of matches won; 2) Difference between points for and against; 3) Total number of points for; 4) Aggregate number of points scored in matches between tied teams; 5) Number of matches won excluding the first match, then the second and so on until the tie is settled.

== Current squads ==
=== Connacht Men Coaches and management ===
Note: Flags indicate national union as has been defined under WR eligibility rules. Individuals may hold more than one non-WR nationality.

| Role | Name | Union |
|---|---|---|
| Chief Executive | Willie Ruane | Ireland |
| Head of Rugby Operations | Tim Allnutt | New Zealand |
| Head coach | Stuart Lancaster | England |
| Lineout & Maul Coach | John Muldoon | Ireland |
| Scrum Coach | Trevor Woodman | England |
| Backs Coach | Gerard Mullen | Ireland |
| Senior Performance Analyst | Simon Kavanagh | Ireland |
| Head of Athletic Performance | Allan Temple Jones | South Africa |
| Head of Physiotherapy | Dave Hanly | Ireland |
| Academy Manager | Eric Elwood | Ireland |

=== Connacht Men Squad ===
2026–27 Connacht Men Squad
| **Props**: (Ireland) Fiachna Barrett; (Ireland) **Finlay Bealham**; (Ireland) **Billy Bohan**; (Ireland) Jerry Cahir; (Ireland) Thomas Connolly; (Ireland) Jordan Duggan; (Ireland) **Sam Illo**; (South Africa) Francois van Wyk; **Hookers**: (Ireland) Eoin de Buitléar; (Ireland) **Dave Heffernan**; (Ireland) Dylan Tierney-Martin; (Ireland) Matthew Victory; **Locks**: (Ireland) Josh Murphy; (Ireland) **Darragh Murray**; (Ireland) Niall Murray; (Ireland) David O'Connor | **Back row**: (Ireland) **Paul Boyle**; (Ireland) **Will Connors**; (New Zealand) Shamus Hurley-Langton; (Ireland) **Sean Jansen**; (Ireland) Seán O'Brien; (Ireland) **Cian Prendergast** **(c)**; **Scrum-halves**: (Ireland) **Caolin Blade**; (Ireland) **Ben Murphy**; (Ireland) Colm Reilly; **Fly-halves**: (Ireland) **Ciarán Frawley**; (Samoa) Josh Ioane; (Ireland) Seán Naughton | **Centres**: (Ireland) **Bundee Aki**; (Ireland) John Devine; (Ireland) Cathal Forde; (Ireland) **Hugh Gavin**; **Back Three**: (Ireland) **Shayne Bolton**; (New Zealand) Sam Gilbert; (Ireland) **Mack Hansen**; (Ireland) Shane Jennings; (Australia) Byron Ralston *; (Ireland) Finn Treacy; (Ireland) Harry West |
**(c)** denotes the team captain. **Bold** denotes internationally capped players. * denotes players qualified to play for Ireland on residency or dual nationality. Taking into account signings and departures ahead of 2026–27 season as listed on List of 2026–27 United Rugby Championship transfers. Source:

=== Connacht Men Academy Squad ===
2026–27 Connacht Men Academy squad (18 members with Year stages)
| **Props**: (Ireland) Adam Cooper (1); (Ireland) Rory Lyons (1); (Ireland) Luke Murtagh (1); **Hookers**: (Ireland) Duinn Maguire (1); (Ireland) Mikey Yarr (2); **Locks**: (Ireland) David Walsh (2); (Ireland) Liam McNamee (1) | **Back row**: (Ireland) Max Flynn (3); (Ireland) Aaron O'Brien (2); (Ireland) Diarmaid O'Connell (2); (Ireland) Bobby Power (2); (Ireland) Charlie Keane (1); **Scrum-halves**: (Germany) Albert Lindner (2); **Fly-halves** (None) | **Centres**: (Ireland) Seán Walsh (2); (Ireland) Rourke O'Sullivan (1); **Back three**: (Ireland) Cian Brady (1); (Ireland) Daniel Ryan (2); (Ireland) James Nicholson (3) |
**(c)** denotes the team captain. **Bold** denotes internationally capped players. * denotes players qualified to play for Ireland on residency or dual nationality. Taking into account signings and departures ahead of 2026–27 season as listed on List of 2026–27 United Rugby Championship transfers. Source:

=== Connacht Women ===
Connacht Women Squad 2026/27
| **Props**: (Ireland) Ella Burns; (Ireland) Evie Kennedy*; (Ireland) Hannah Rapley; (Ireland) Laura Scuffil; **Hookers**: (Ireland) Uillin Eilian; (Ireland) Stacy Hanley; (Ireland) Anna McDermott*; (Ireland) Amanda McQuade; (Ireland) **Cliodhna Moloney-MacDonald**; **Locks**: (Ireland) Jemima Adams Verlings; (Ireland) Katie Griffin*; (Ireland) Olivia Tallon Daly | **Back Row**: (Ireland) Hannah Coen; (Ireland) Emma Fabby; (Ireland) Catherine Fleming*; (Ireland) Poppy Garvey; (Ireland) Hannah Johnston; (Ireland) Merisa Kiripati; (Ireland) **Edel McMahon**; (Ireland) **Faith Oviawe**; (Ireland) **Ailish Quinn**; **Scrum-halves**: (Ireland) Amy McGuire; (Ireland) Grainne Moran; (Ireland) **Aoibheann Reilly**; **Fly-halves**: (Ireland) Siofra Hession | **Centres**: (Ireland) Emma Kelly; (Ireland) Lyndsey Clarke; (Ireland) Sarah Purcell; **Back Three**: (Ireland) Clara Barrett; (Ireland) **Kyah Coady***; (Ireland) Sophie Cullen; (Ireland) **Meabh Deely**; (Ireland) **Alanna Fitzpatrick**; (Ireland) Emily Foley; (Ireland) **Clare Gorman**; (Ireland) Aoife Heaney; (Ireland) **Anna McGann**; (Ireland) Roisin O'Sullivan; (Ireland) **Béibhinn Parsons**; (Ireland) Ava Ryder |
Players listed in **Bold** have represented their country internationally in Rugby Union or Sevens. *Denotes Devolepment Player

== Honours ==
| Competition | Championships | Best result |
|---|---|---|
| Inter-Provincial Championship | 3 (all shared) | Champions: 1956–57 (shared), 1957–58 (shared), 1964–65 (shared) |
| United Rugby Championship | 1 | Champions 2015–16 |
| Champions Cup | 0 | Last 16: 2021–22 |
| Challenge Cup | 0 | Semi-finalists: 2003–04, 2004–05, 2009–10 |

== Season records ==
| | Domestic League | | | | European Cup | | Domestic / 'A' Cup | |
| Season | Competition | Final position (Pool) | Points | Play-offs | Competition | Performance | Competition | Performance |
|---|---|---|---|---|---|---|---|---|
| 1995–96 | N/A | | | | N/A | | Interprovincial Championship | 5th |
| 1996–97 | N/A | | | | Challenge Cup | 4th in pool | Interprovincial Championship | 4th |
| 1997–98 | N/A | | | | Challenge Cup | Quarterfinal | Interprovincial Championship | 4th |
| 1998–99 | N/A | | | | Challenge Cup | 5th in pool | Interprovincial Championship | 4th |
| 1999–2000 | N/A | | | | Challenge Cup | 3rd in pool | Interprovincial Championship | 4th |
| 2000–01 | N/A | | | | Challenge Cup | 4th in pool | Interprovincial Championship | 4th |
| 2001–02 | Celtic League | 2nd (B) | 12 | Quarter-final | Challenge Cup | 4th in pool | Interprovincial Championship | 4th |
| 2002–03 | Celtic League | 4th (B) | 20 | Quarter-final | Challenge Cup | Quarter-final | N/A | |
| 2003–04 | Celtic League | 9th | 44 | N/A | Challenge Cup | Semi-final | Celtic Cup | Semi-final |
| 2004–05 | Celtic League | 10th | 37 | N/A | Challenge Cup | Semi-final | N/A | |
| 2005–06 | Celtic League | 10th | 37 | N/A | Challenge Cup | Quarter-final | N/A | |
| 2006–07 | Magners League | 10th | 26 | N/A | Challenge Cup | 3rd in pool | N/A | |
| 2007–08 | Magners League | 10th | 24 | N/A | Challenge Cup | 3rd in pool | N/A | |
| 2008–09 | Magners League | 10th | 20 | N/A | Challenge Cup | Quarter-final | N/A | |
| 2009–10 | Magners League | 10th | 26 | Did not qualify | Challenge Cup | Semi-final | N/A | |
| 2010–11 | Magners League | 9th | 39 | Did not qualify | Challenge Cup | 2nd in pool | N/A | |
| 2011–12 | RaboDirect PRO12 | 8th | 37 | Did not qualify | Heineken Cup | 4th in pool | N/A | |
| 2012–13 | RaboDirect PRO12 | 8th | 38 | Did not qualify | Heineken Cup | 3rd in pool | British and Irish Cup | 4th in pool |
| 2013–14 | RaboDirect PRO12 | 10th | 35 | Did not qualify | Heineken Cup | 3rd in pool | British and Irish Cup | 4th in pool |
| 2014–15 | Guinness PRO12 | 7th | 50 | Did not qualify | Challenge Cup | Quarter-final | British and Irish Cup | 4th in pool |
| 2015–16 | Guinness PRO12 | 2nd | 73 | Champions | Challenge Cup | Quarter-final | British and Irish Cup | 4th in pool |
| 2016–17 | Guinness PRO12 | 8th | 44 | Did not qualify | Champions Cup | 3rd in pool | British and Irish Cup | 4th in pool |
| 2017–18 | Guinness PRO14 | 6th (A) | 39 | Did not qualify | Challenge Cup | Quarter-final | British and Irish Cup | 3rd in pool |
| 2018–19 | Guinness PRO14 | 3rd (B) | 61 | Quarter-final | Challenge Cup | Quarter-final | Celtic Cup | 4th in pool |
| 2019–20 | Guinness PRO14 | 4th (B) | 40 | Did not qualify | Champions Cup | 4th in pool | Celtic Cup | 3rd in pool |
| 2020–21 | Guinness PRO14 | 2nd (B) | 45 | Did not qualify | Challenge Cup* | Round-of-16 | Rainbow Cup | 6th in pool |
| 2021–22 | United Rugby Championship | 11th | 41 | Did not qualify | Champions Cup | Round-of-16 | URC Irish Shield | 4th |
| 2022–23 | United Rugby Championship | 7th | 50 | Semi-final | Challenge Cup | Round-of-16 | URC Irish Shield | 4th |
| 2023–24 | United Rugby Championship | 11th | 45 | Did not qualify | Challenge Cup* | Quarter-finals | URC Irish Shield | 4th |
| 2024–25 | United Rugby Championship | 13th | 39 | Did not qualify | Challenge Cup | Quarter-finals | URC Irish Shield | 4th |

Gold background denotes champions
Silver background denotes runner-up

* After dropping into the competition from the Champions Cup/Heineken Cup

=== United Rugby Championship ===
| Season | Pos | Played | Won | Drew | Lost | PF | PA | PD | Bonus | Points |
|---|---|---|---|---|---|---|---|---|---|---|
| 2001–02 | 2nd (Pool B) | 6 | 4 | 0 | 2 | 152 | 97 | +55 | n/a | 12 |
| 2001–02 | Quarter-final | Connacht 29–34 Glasgow | | | | | | | | |
| 2002–03 | 4th (Pool B) | 7 | 5 | 0 | 2 | 126 | 176 | –50 | 0 | 20 |
| 2002–03 | Quarter-final | Munster 33–3 Connacht | | | | | | | | |
| 2003–04 (Lg) | 9th | 22 | 8 | 2 | 12 | 479 | 550 | −71 | 8 | 44 |
| 2003–04 (Cup) | 1st round | Borders 21–26 Connacht | | | | | | | | |
| 2003–04 (Cup) | Quarter-final | Scarlets 12–14 Connacht | | | | | | | | |
| 2003–04 (Cup) | Semi-final | Connacht 25–26 Edinburgh | | | | | | | | |
| 2004–05 | 10th | 20 | 7 | 1 | 12 | 317 | 407 | –90 | 7 | 37 |
| 2005–06 | 10th | 22 | 6 | 0 | 14 | 325 | 466 | –141 | 5 | 37 (Note: 11 teams were involved in this season, so one team did not play each week and were awarded 4 points instead. Therefore, each team finished the season with 8 more points than the table would seem to warrant.) |
| 2006–07 | 10th | 20 | 4 | 2 | 14 | 326 | 474 | –148 | 6 | 26 |
| 2007–08 | 10th | 18 | 5 | 1 | 12 | 214 | 396 | –182 | 2 | 24 |
| 2008–09 | 10th | 18 | 4 | 0 | 14 | 224 | 460 | –236 | 4 | 20 |
| 2009–10 | 10th | 18 | 5 | 1 | 12 | 254 | 459 | –205 | 4 | 26 |
| 2010–11 | 9th | 22 | 7 | 1 | 14 | 394 | 459 | –65 | 9 | 39 |
| 2011–12 | 8th | 22 | 7 | 1 | 14 | 321 | 433 | –112 | 7 | 37 |
| 2012–13 | 8th | 22 | 8 | 1 | 13 | 358 | 422 | –64 | 4 | 38 |
| 2013–14 | 10th | 22 | 6 | 0 | 16 | 371 | 509 | −138 | 11 | 35 |
| 2014–15 | 7th | 22 | 10 | 1 | 11 | 447 | 419 | +28 | 8 | 50 |
| 2015–16 | 2nd | 22 | 15 | 0 | 7 | 507 | 406 | +101 | 13 | 73 |
| 2015–16 | Semi–final | Connacht 16–11 Glasgow Warriors | | | | | | | | |
| 2015–16 | Final | Connacht 20–10 Leinster | | | | | | | | |
| 2016–17 | 8th | 22 | 9 | 0 | 13 | 413 | 498 | −85 | 8 | 44 |
| 2017–18 | 6th (Conf. A) | 21 | 7 | 0 | 14 | 445 | 477 | −32 | 11 | 39 |
| 2018–19 | 3rd (Conf. A) | 21 | 12 | 0 | 9 | 475 | 394 | +81 | 13 | 61 |
| 2018–19 | Quarter–final | Ulster 21–13 Connacht | | | | | | | | |
| 2019–20 | 4th (Conf. B) | 15 | 8 | 0 | 7 | 302 | 360 | −58 | 8 | 40 |
| 2020–21 | 2nd (Conf. B) | 16 | 8 | 0 | 8 | 396 | 353 | +43 | 13 | 45 |
| 2021–22 | 11th | 18 | 9 | 0 | 9 | 399 | 502 | –103 | 5 | 41 |
| 2022–23 | 7th | 18 | 10 | 0 | 8 | 456 | 426 | +30 | 10 | 50 |
| 2022–23 | Quarter–final | Ulster 10–15 Connacht | | | | | | | | |
| 2022–23 | Semi–final | Stormers 43–25 Connacht | | | | | | | | |
| 2023–24 | 11th | 18 | 9 | 0 | 9 | 404 | 432 | –28 | 9 | 45 |
| 2024–25 | 13th | 18 | 6 | 0 | 12 | 420 | 472 | –52 | 15 | 39 |

=== Champions Cup ===
| Season | Pool pos. | Played | Won | Drew | Lost | PF | PA | PD | Bonus | Points |
|---|---|---|---|---|---|---|---|---|---|---|
| 2011–12 | 4th | 6 | 1 | 0 | 5 | 68 | 130 | −62 | 2 | 6 |
| 2012–13 | 3rd | 6 | 3 | 0 | 3 | 96 | 138 | −42 | 0 | 12 |
| 2013–14 | 3rd | 6 | 3 | 0 | 3 | 101 | 147 | –46 | 1 | 13 |
| 2015–16 | Qualifying | Gloucester 40 − 32 (a.e.t.) Connacht | | | | | | | | |
| 2016–17 | 3rd | 6 | 4 | 0 | 2 | 188 | 118 | +70 | 2 | 18 |
| 2017–18 | Qualifying | Northampton Saints 21–15 Connacht | | | | | | | | |
| 2019–20 | 4th | 6 | 2 | 0 | 4 | 120 | 158 | –38 | 2 | 10 |
| 2020–21 | 10th | 2 | 0 | 0 | 2 | 40 | 53 | –13 | 1 | 1 |
| 2021–22 | 5th | 4 | 1 | 0 | 4 | 118 | 104 | +14 | 6 | 10 |
| 2021–22 | Round of 16 | Connacht 21 − 26 Leinster | | | | | | | | |
| 2021–22 | Round of 16 | Leinster 56 − 20 Connacht | | | | | | | | |
| 2023–24 | 5th | 4 | 1 | 0 | 3 | 88 | 140 | –52 | 2 | 6 |

Qualifying matches for 2015/16 and 2017/18 ERCC were played at the end of the previous seasons (2014/15 and 2016/17 respectively).

=== Challenge Cup ===
| Season | Pool pos. | Played | Won | Drew | Lost | PF | PA | PD | Bonus | Points |
|---|---|---|---|---|---|---|---|---|---|---|
| 1996–97 | 4th | 5 | 2 | 0 | 3 | 94 | 131 | –37 | n/a | 4 |
| 1997–98 | 1st | 6 | 5 | 0 | 1 | 144 | 97 | +47 | n/a | 10 |
| 1997–98 | Quarter-final | Agen 40–27 Connacht | | | | | | | | |
| 1998–99 | 5th | 6 | 3 | 0 | 3 | 129 | 156 | –27 | n/a | 6 |
| 1999–00 | 3rd | 6 | 2 | 0 | 4 | 131 | 165 | –34 | n/a | 4 |
| 2000–01 | 4th | 6 | 1 | 0 | 5 | 60 | 152 | –92 | n/a | 2 |
| 2001–02 | 2nd | 6 | 3 | 0 | 3 | 157 | 140 | +17 | n/a | 6 |
| 2002–03 | Round 1 | Mont-de-Marsan 12–26 Connacht | | | | | | | | |
| 2002–03 | Round 1 | Connacht 47–29 Mont-de-Marsan | | | | | | | | |
| 2002–03 | Round 2 | Narbonne 42–27 Connacht | | | | | | | | |
| 2002–03 | Round 2 | Connacht 23–7 Narbonne | | | | | | | | |
| 2002–03 | Quarter-final | Connacht 30–35 Pontypridd | | | | | | | | |
| 2002–03 | Quarter-final | Pontypridd 12–9 Connacht | | | | | | | | |
| 2003–04 | Round 1 | Béziers 10–18 Connacht | | | | | | | | |
| 2003–04 | Round 1 | Connacht 11–13 Béziers | | | | | | | | |
| 2003–04 | Round 2 | Connacht 29–7 Pau | | | | | | | | |
| 2003–04 | Round 2 | Pau 10–6 Connacht | | | | | | | | |
| 2003–04 | Quarter-final | Narbonne 18–27 Connacht | | | | | | | | |
| 2003–04 | Quarter-final | Connacht 16–10 Narbonne | | | | | | | | |
| 2003–04 | Semi-final | Harlequins 31–22 Connacht | | | | | | | | |
| 2003–04 | Semi-final | Connacht 23–18 Harlequins | | | | | | | | |
| 2004–05 | Round 1 | Narbonne 25–11 Connacht | | | | | | | | |
| 2004–05 | Round 1 | Connacht 40–21 Narbonne | | | | | | | | |
| 2004–05 | Round 2 | Connacht 56–3 Montpellier | | | | | | | | |
| 2004–05 | Round 2 | Montpellier 19–14 Connacht | | | | | | | | |
| 2004–05 | Quarter-final | Grenoble 21–26 Connacht | | | | | | | | |
| 2004–05 | Quarter-final | Connacht 19–3 Grenoble | | | | | | | | |
| 2004–05 | Semi-final | Connacht 18–25 Sale Sharks | | | | | | | | |
| 2004–05 | Semi-final | Sale Sharks 59–9 Connacht | | | | | | | | |
| 2005–06 | 2nd | 6 | 4 | 0 | 2 | 190 | 119 | +71 | 4 | 20 |
| 2005–06 | Quarter-final | Newcastle Falcons 23–3 Connacht | | | | | | | | |
| 2006–07 | 3rd | 6 | 1 | 0 | 5 | 119 | 150 | –31 | 4 | 8 |
| 2007–08 | 3rd | 6 | 3 | 0 | 3 | 172 | 97 | +75 | 3 | 15 |
| 2008–09 | 2nd | 6 | 4 | 0 | 2 | 159 | 140 | +19 | 3 | 19 |
| 2008–09 | Quarter-final | Northampton Saints 42–13 Connacht | | | | | | | | |
| 2009–10 | 1st | 6 | 6 | 0 | 0 | 199 | 63 | +136 | 2 | 26 |
| 2009–10 | Quarter-final | Connacht 23–20 Bourgoin | | | | | | | | |
| 2009–10 | Semi-final | Connacht 12–19 Toulon | | | | | | | | |
| 2010–11 | 2nd | 6 | 3 | 0 | 3 | 173 | 99 | +74 | 3 | 15 |
| 2014–15 | 2nd | 6 | 4 | 0 | 2 | 186 | 144 | +42 | 4 | 20 |
| 2014–15 | Quarter-final | Gloucester 14–7 Connacht | | | | | | | | |
| 2015–16 | 1st | 6 | 4 | 0 | 2 | 147 | 96 | +51 | 3 | 19 |
| 2015–16 | Quarter-final | Grenoble 33–32 Connacht | | | | | | | | |
| 2017–18 | 1st | 6 | 5 | 1 | 0 | 225 | 102 | +123 | 4 | 26 |
| 2017–18 | Quarter-final | Connacht 28–33 Gloucester | | | | | | | | |
| 2018–19 | 2nd | 6 | 5 | 1 | 0 | 146 | 120 | +26 | 2 | 22 |
| 2018–19 | Quarter-final | Sale Sharks 20–10 Connacht | | | | | | | | |
| 2020–21 | Round-of-16† | Leicester Tigers 48–32 Connacht | | | | | | | | |
| 2022–23 | 5th | 4 | 3 | 0 | 1 | 135 | 72 | +63 | 2 | 14 |
| 2022–23 | Round-of-16 | Benetton 41–19 Connacht | | | | | | | | |
| 2023–24 | Round-of-16† | Pau 30–40 Connacht | | | | | | | | |
| 2023–24 | Quarter-finals | Benetton 39–24 Connacht | | | | | | | | |
2024–25
| 2024–25 | 1st | 4 | 4 | 0 | 0 | 154 | 73 | +81 | 4 | 20 |
| 2024–25 | Round-of-16 | Connacht 35–20 Cardiff Blues | | | | | | | | |
| 2024–25 | Quarter-finals | Connacht 40–43 Racing 92 | | | | | | | | |
2025–26
| 2025–26 | 3rd | 4 | 2 | 0 | 2 | 179 | 71 | +108 | 5 | 13 |
| 2025–26 | Round-of-16 | Connacht 29–12 Sharks | | | | | | | | |
| 2025–26 | Quarter-finals | Montpellier 45–22 Connacht | | | | | | | | |

†After failing to qualify for Champions Cup knockout round, Connacht joined the Challenge Cup at the Round of 16 stage.

== Results versus representative sides ==
Scores and results list Connacht's points tally first.

| Date | Opponent | Location | Result | Score | Notes |
|---|---|---|---|---|---|
| 1 March 1973 | Spain | Crowley Park, Galway | Won | 11–10 | |
| 6 November 1973 | Argentina XV | The Sportsground, Galway | Lost | 7–16 | Match Report |
| 20 November 1974 | New Zealand | The Sportsground, Galway | Lost | 3–25 | Match Report |
| 14 October 1980 | Romania | Galway | Lost | 9–28 | Match Report |
| 26 October 1985 | Fiji | Galway | Lost | 6–7 | Match Report |
| 5 November 1988 | Western Samoa | The Sportsground, Galway | Won | 25–18 | Match Report |
| 14 November 1989 | New Zealand | Galway | Lost | 6–40 | Match Report |
| 1990 | Spain | Galway | Won | 31–19 | |
| 27 October 1992 | Australia | The Sportsground, Galway | Lost | 6–14 | Match Report |
| 15 November 1995 | Fiji | The Sportsground, Galway | Won | 27–5 | |
| 13 November 1996 | Australia | The Sportsground, Galway | Lost | 20–37 | Match Report |
| 7 August 1998 | Morocco | The Sportsground, Galway | Won | 30–5 | Match Report |
| 21 August 1999 | Ireland Select XV | | Lost | 26–43 | Match Report |
| 21 August 2007 | South Africa | The Sportsground, Galway | Lost | 3–18 | Match Report |
| 8 November 2008 | Portugal | The Sportsground, Galway | Won | 27–11 | Match Report |
| 9 November 2010 | Samoa | The Sportsground, Galway | Won | 26–22 | Match Report |
| 18 August 2011 | Ireland Select XV | Donnybrook Stadium, Dublin | Lost | 3–38 | Match Report |
| 21 August 2019 | Russia | VTB Arena, Moscow | Won | 42–14 | Match Report |

== Record against URC, European Cup & European Challenge Cup opponents ==
| Against | Played | Won | Drawn | Lost | % Won |
|---|---|---|---|---|---|
| (France) Agen | 1 | 0 | 0 | 1 | 00.00% |
| (Italy) Aironi | 3 | 2 | 0 | 1 | 66.67% |
| (England) Bath | 2 | 0 | 0 | 2 | 00.00% |
| (France) Bayonne | 4 | 4 | 0 | 0 | 100.00% |
| (Italy) Benetton | 27 | 18 | 1 | 8 | 66.67% |
| (France) Béziers | 4 | 1 | 0 | 3 | 25.00% |
| (France) Biarritz | 4 | 2 | 0 | 2 | 50.00% |
| (Georgia (country)) Black Lion | 1 | 1 | 0 | 0 | 100.00% |
| (France) Bordeaux Begles | 5 | 4 | 0 | 1 | 80.00% |
| (Scotland) Border Reivers | 10 | 7 | 0 | 3 | 70.00% |
| (France) Bourgoin | 1 | 1 | 0 | 0 | 100.00% |
| (Wales) Bridgend | 1 | 1 | 0 | 0 | 100.00% |
| (England) Bristol Bears | 2 | 1 | 0 | 1 | 50.00% |
| (France) Brive | 8 | 5 | 0 | 3 | 62.5% |
| (South Africa) Bulls | 5 | 1 | 0 | 4 | 20.00% |
| (Wales) Caerphilly | 4 | 0 | 1 | 3 | 75.00% |
| (Wales) Cardiff Blues | 44 | 16 | 2 | 26 | 36.36% |
| (Italy) Catania | 2 | 1 | 0 | 1 | 50.00% |
| (Italy) Cavalieri Prato | 2 | 1 | 0 | 1 | 50.00% |
| (Wales) Celtic Warriors | 2 | 0 | 0 | 2 | 00.00% |
| (South Africa) Cheetahs | 5 | 4 | 0 | 1 | 80.00% |
| (France) Clermont | 2 | 0 | 0 | 2 | 00.00% |
| (France) Dax | 2 | 2 | 0 | 0 | 100.00% |
| (Wales) Dragons | 38 | 26 | 0 | 12 | 68.42% |
| (Wales) Dunvant RFC | 1 | 0 | 0 | 1 | 00.00% |
| (Wales) Ebbw Vale | 2 | 0 | 0 | 2 | 50.00% |
| (Scotland) Edinburgh | 39 | 15 | 2 | 22 | 38.46% |
| (Spain) El Salvador | 2 | 2 | 0 | 0 | 100.00% |
| (Russia) Enisei STM | 2 | 2 | 0 | 0 | 100.00% |
| (England) Exeter Chiefs | 2 | 0 | 0 | 2 | 00.00% |
| (Scotland) Glasgow Warriors | 42 | 12 | 3 | 27 | 28.57% |
| (England) Gloucester | 7 | 1 | 0 | 6 | 14.29% |
| (France) Grenoble | 3 | 2 | 0 | 1 | 66.67% |
| (England) Harlequins | 10 | 2 | 0 | 8 | 20.00% |
| (France) La Rochelle | 2 | 2 | 0 | 0 | 100.00% |
| (England) Leicester Tigers | 3 | 0 | 0 | 3 | 00.00% |
| (Ireland) Leinster* | 48 | 9 | 0 | 39 | 18.75% |
| (South Africa) Lions | 4 | 2 | 0 | 2 | 50% |
| (England) London Irish | 2 | 0 | 0 | 2 | 00.00% |
| (France) Lyon | 2 | 1 | 0 | 1 | 50.00% |
| (France) Mont de Marsan | 2 | 2 | 0 | 0 | 100.00% |
| (France) Montauban | 1 | 1 | 0 | 0 | 100% |
| (France) Montpellier Hérault Rugby | 12 | 7 | 0 | 5 | 58.33% |
| (Ireland) Munster* | 48 | 9 | 1 | 38 | 18.75% |
| (France) Narbonne | 9 | 5 | 0 | 4 | 55.56% |
| (Wales) Neath | 3 | 2 | 0 | 1 | 66.67% |
| (England) Newcastle Falcons | 7 | 3 | 0 | 4 | 42.86% |
| (Wales) Newport | 3 | 2 | 0 | 1 | 66.67% |
| (France) Nice | 2 | 1 | 0 | 1 | 50.00% |
| (England) Northampton Saints | 5 | 2 | 0 | 3 | 40.00% |
| (Spain) Olympus Rugby XV Madrid | 2 | 2 | 0 | 0 | 100.00% |
| (England) Orrell R.U.F.C. | 1 | 1 | 0 | 0 | 100.00% |
| (Wales) Ospreys | 42 | 16 | 0 | 26 | 38.1% |
| (France) Oyonnax | 2 | 2 | 0 | 0 | 100.00% |
| (France) Pau | 3 | 2 | 0 | 1 | 66.67% |
| (France) Périgueux | 1 | 1 | 0 | 0 | 100.00% |
| (France) Perpignan | 3 | 3 | 0 | 0 | 100.00% |
| (Italy) Petrarca | 1 | 1 | 0 | 0 | 50.00% |
| (Wales) Pontypridd | 3 | 0 | 0 | 3 | 00.00% |
| (France) Racing 92 | 3 | 0 | 0 | 3 | 00.00% |
| (Italy) Roma | 2 | 2 | 0 | 0 | 100.00% |
| (Italy) Rovigo | 3 | 3 | 0 | 0 | 100.00% |
| (England) Sale Sharks | 7 | 1 | 0 | 6 | 14.29% |
| (England) Saracens | 3 | 0 | 0 | 3 | 00.00% |
| (Wales) Scarlets | 40 | 16 | 1 | 23 | 40% |
| (South Africa) Sharks | 6 | 5 | 0 | 1 | 83.33% |
| (South Africa) Southern Kings | 4 | 4 | 0 | 0 | 100.00% |
| (South Africa) Stormers | 6 | 2 | 0 | 4 | 33.33% |
| (France) Stade Français Paris | 2 | 1 | 0 | 1 | 50.00% |
| (Romania) Steaua Bucharest Rugby | 2 | 1 | 0 | 1 | 50.00% |
| (France) Toulon | 4 | 1 | 0 | 3 | 25.00% |
| (France) Toulouse | 8 | 2 | 0 | 6 | 25.00% |
| (Ireland) Ulster* | 50 | 14 | 1 | 35 | 28% |
| (England) Wasps | 2 | 1 | 0 | 1 | 50.00% |
| (England) Worcester Warriors | 6 | 4 | 1 | 1 | 66.67% |
| (Italy) Zebre | 32 | 29 | 0 | 3 | 90.63% |
| Total | 680 | 296 | 13 | 371 | 43.53% |
^{*}Matches played as part of the Irish Interprovincial Rugby Championship, separate from Celtic League fixtures, are not included in this table.

Correct as of 20 April 2026

== Records against Irish provinces (1946–present) ==
| Against | Played | Won | Drawn | Lost | % Won |
|---|---|---|---|---|---|
| Leinster | 109 | 19 | 4 | 86 | 17.43% |
| Munster | 106 | 13 | 3 | 90 | 12.26% |
| Ulster | 107 | 23 | 4 | 80 | 21.5% |
| Total | 322 | 55 | 11 | 256 | 169.25% |

Correct as of 23 March 2026.

== Head coaches (professional era) ==
As of 28 April 2026

| Coach | Seasons | GP* | W | D | L | Win % | Loss % | Championships / Notes |
|---|---|---|---|---|---|---|---|---|
| (Ireland) Eddie O'Sullivan† | 1993/94 – 1995/96 | 5 | 1 | 0 | 4 | 20% | 80% | |
| (New Zealand) Warren Gatland | 1996/97 – 1997/98 | 19 | 9 | 0 | 10 | 47.37% | 52.63% | |
| (New Zealand) Glenn Ross | 1998/99 – 1999/2000 | 26 | 8 | 0 | 18 | 30.77% | 69.23% | |
| (South Africa) Steph Nel | 2000/01 – 2002/03 | 41 | 17 | 0 | 24 | 41.46% | 58.54% | |
| (Ireland) Michael Bradley | 2003/04 – 2009/10 | 190 | 69 | 7 | 114 | 36.32% | 60% | Celtic Rugby Chairman's Award (2010) |
| (Ireland) Eric Elwood | 2010/11 – 2012/13 | 86 | 30 | 3 | 53 | 34.88% | 62.35% | |
| (Samoa) Pat Lam | 2013/14 – 2016/17 | 118 | 57 | 1 | 60 | 48.31% | 50.85% | Pro14 (2016); Pro14 Coach of the year (2016) |
| (New Zealand) Kieran Keane | 2017/18 | 28 | 12 | 1 | 15 | 42.86% | 53.57% | |
| (Australia) Andy Friend | 2018/19 – 2021/22 | 99 | 49 | 0 | 50 | 49.49% | 50.51% | |
| (England) Pete Wilkins | 2022/23 – 2024/25 (mid-season) | 65 | 35 | 0 | 30 | 53.85% | 46.15% | |
| (Ireland) Cullie Tucker | 2024/25 (mid-season) | 4 | 1 | 0 | 3 | 25% | 75% | Interim |
| (England) Stuart Lancaster | 2025/26– | 21 | 11 | 0 | 10 | 52.38% | 47.62% | |
| Total | 1995–present | 703 | 299 | 12 | 392 | 42.53% | 55.76% | —N/a |
^{*}Games played are inclusive of matches played against touring international sides, but do not include friendlies against club opposition.
†O'Sullivan was the Connacht head coach between 1993 and 1996, but only matches during the professional era (1995–96 season) are included in this table.

== Notable players ==
See also Category:Connacht Rugby players

=== Ireland ===
The following Connacht players have represented Ireland at full international level.
[Players in bold are currently representing Connacht]

- Niyi Adeolokun
- Rodney Ah You
- **Bundee Aki**
- Henry Anderson
- Sammy Arnold
- **Jack Aungier**
- Nicky Barry
- **Finlay Bealham**
- **Caolin Blade**
- Stephen Blake-Knox
- **Shayne Bolton**
- **Paul Boyle**
- Tony Buckley
- Locky Butler
- Adam Byrne
- Kieran Campbell
- **Jack Carty**
- Tom Clancy
- John Cooney
- Robin Copeland
- Victor Costello
- Seán Cronin
- Tom Cullen
- David Curtis
- Ultan Dillane
- Johnny Dooley
- James Downey
- Gavin Duffy
- Pat Duignan
- PJ Dwyer
- Eric Elwood
- Ciaran Fitzgerald
- Jerry Flannery
- Paul Flavin
- John Fogarty
- **Hugh Gavin**
- Leo Galvin
- Simon Geoghegan
- Brendan Guerin
- Jamie Hagan
- **Mack Hansen**
- Matt Healy
- **Dave Heffernan**
- George Henebrey
- Robbie Henshaw
- Bernard Jackman
- Ian Keatley
- Mick Leahy
- Ronan Loughney
- Charlie Lydon
- Eamonn Maguire
- Noel Mannion
- Kieran Marmion
- Mike McCarthy
- Robbie McGrath
- Conor McGuinness
- Mark McHugh
- Stephen McIvor
- Feidlim McLoughlin
- Ray McLoughlin
- Aengus McMorrow
- Mick Molloy
- Matt Mostyn
- Mick Moylett
- John Muldoon
- **Ben Murphy**
- **Darragh Murray**
- Hubie O'Connor
- Johnny O'Connor
- Barry O'Driscoll
- John O'Driscoll
- Tiernan O'Halloran
- Tony O'Sullivan
- **Cian Prendergast**
- Eoin Reddan
- Dickie Roche
- Quinn Roux
- Jim Staples
- Tom Tierney
- Noel Turley
- Nathan White

=== British and Irish Lions ===
The following Connacht players have represented the British and Irish Lions.

(c) Tour captain

- Ray McLoughlin: 1966, 1971
- John O'Driscoll: 1980, 1983
- Ciaran Fitzgerald: 1983 **(c)**
- Robbie Henshaw: 2017, 2021
- Bundee Aki: 2021, 2025
- Finlay Bealham: 2025
- Mack Hansen: 2025

=== Overseas internationals ===
The following Connacht players have earned full caps for their national side at senior level.

- (Australia) Kyle Godwin
- (Australia) Warwick Waugh
- (Canada) Shane O'Leary
- (England) Robbie Morris
- (Fiji) Naulia Dawai
- (New Zealand) Mils Muliaina
- (New Zealand) Josh Ioane
- (Samoa) Henry Fa'afili
- (Samoa) Stacey Ili
- (Samoa) Ray Ofisa
- (Samoa) James So'oialo
- (Samoa) Ezra Taylor
- (Samoa) Ofisa Treviranus
- (Samoa) Gavin Williams
- (Scotland) Dan Parks
- (Scotland) Eric Peters
- (South Africa) Marnitz Boshoff
- (Tonga) Fetuʻu Vainikolo
- (Tonga) Leva Fifita
- (United States) Tadhg Leader
- (United States) AJ MacGinty
- (Tonga) Andrew Mailei
- (Samoa) TieTie Tuimauga
- (Tonga) Pita Ahki

== Personnel Awards and Honours ==
=== World Rugby Player of the Year ===
Nominated (4 nominees per year)

| Season | Nominated | Winner |
|---|---|---|
| 2023 | Bundee Aki | |

=== World Rugby Breakthrough Player of the Year ===
Inaugurated 2015

Nominated (3 nominees per year)

| Season | Nominated | Winner |
|---|---|---|
| 2022 | Mack Hansen | |

=== United Rugby Championship Team of the Year ===
| Season | Irish player | Overseas player |
|---|---|---|
| 2006–07 | – | – |
| 2007–08 | – | – |
| 2008–09 | – | – |
| 2009–10 | – | – |
| 2010–11 | Fionn Carr | – |
| 2011–12 | – | – |
| 2012–13 | – | – |
| 2013–14 | – | – |
| 2014–15 | Denis Buckley, Robbie Henshaw | – |
| 2015–16 | Finlay Bealham, Denis Buckley (2), Ultan Dillane, Matt Healy, Kieran Marmion | (New Zealand) Bundee Aki, (New Zealand) Tom McCartney |
| 2016–17 | Tiernan O'Halloran | – |
| 2018–19 | Jack Carty | (Australia) Colby Fainga'a |
| 2019–20 | – | – |
| 2020–21 | Jack Carty (2), Alex Wootton, Gavin Thornbury | – |
| 2021–22 | – | – |
| 2022–23 | Finlay Bealham (2), Niall Murray | – |
| 2023–24 | – | – |
| 2024–25 | – | – |
| 2025–26 | Cian Prendergast, Darragh Murray | - |

=== Pro14 Player of the Year ===
| Competition | Irish players | Overseas players |
|---|---|---|
| 2015–16 | — | (New Zealand) Bundee Aki |

=== United Rugby Championship individual awards ===
| Category | Player | Season | Total |
|---|---|---|---|
| Top try scorer | Matt Healy (joint) | 2015–16 | 10 |
| Top try scorer | Alex Wootton (joint) | 2020–21 | 9 |
| Top point scorer | Jack Carty | 2018–19 | 157 |
| Chairman's Award | Michael Bradley | 2009–10 | N/A |
| Chairman's Award | Michael Swift | 2012–13 | N/A |
| Chairman's Award | John Muldoon | 2015–16 | N/A |
| Coach of the Year | Pat Lam | 2015–16 | N/A |
| Ronseal Tackle Machine | Paul Boyle | 2019–20 | 179 (98.3%) |

=== United Rugby Championship team awards ===
- 2013–14 Pro12 Collision Kings
- 2013–14 Pro12 Fair Play Award (joint)
- 2014–15 Pro12 Fair Play Award
- 2016–17 Pro14 Fair Play Award

== Player records ==
Most tries
| Rank | Player | Tries |
|---|---|---|
| 1 | Matt Healy | 58 |
| 2 | **Caolin Blade** | 55 |
| 3 | Tiernan O'Halloran | 48 |
| 4 | Fionn Carr | 42 |
| 4 | Kieran Marmion | 42 |
| 6 | Niyi Adeolokun | 33 |
| 7 | Conor McPhillips | 32 |
| 7 | **Bundee Aki** | 32 |
| 9 | John Muldoon | 23 |
| 10 | **Jack Carty** | 22 |

Most caps
| Rank | Player | Caps |
|---|---|---|
| 1 | John Muldoon | 327 |
| 2 | **Denis Buckley** | 271 |
| 3 | Michael Swift | 269 |
| 4 | Tiernan O'Halloran | 238 |
| 5 | Kieran Marmion | 230 |
| 6 | **Jack Carty** | 222 |
| 7 | **Dave Heffernan** | 222 |
| 8 | **Finlay Bealham** | 220 |
| 9 | **Caolin Blade** | 211 |
| 10 | Ronan Loughney | 184 |

Most points
| Rank | Player | Points |
|---|---|---|
| 1 | **Jack Carty** | 1,278 |
| 2 | Eric Elwood | 1,152 |
| 3 | Ian Keatley | 688 |
| 4 | Mark McHugh | 463 |
| 5 | Paul Warwick | 452 |
| 6 | Craig Ronaldson | 375 |
| 7 | Daniel Parks | 367 |
| 8 | Matt Healy | 290 |
| 9 | Miah Nikora | 282 |
| 10 | Tiernan O'Halloran | 249 |

Correct as of 07 January 2026. Player(s) in bold are still active with the club.

=== United Rugby Championship player records ===
| Category | Player | Total |
|---|---|---|
| Tries | Caolin Blade | 37 |
| Appearances | John Muldoon | 254 |
| Points | Jack Carty | 919 |
| Successful Conversions & Penalties | Jack Carty | 339 |

Updated 18 October 2025

=== Challenge Cup player records ===
| Category | Player | Total |
|---|---|---|
| Tries | Matt Healy | 19 |
| Appearances | Michael Swift | 65 |
| Points | Eric Elwood | 473 |

Updated 4 March 2023

=== Centurions ===
The following players have earned 100 or more caps for Connacht. Bold indicates player is active with the team.

| Player | Date of 100th cap |
|---|---|
| (Ireland) Eric Elwood | 12 January 2002 v. Narbonne |
| (England) Dan McFarland | 27 December 2005 v. Munster |
| (England) Darren Yapp | 12 May 2006 v. Neath-Swansea Ospreys |
| (Ireland) Matt Mostyn | 20 October 2006 v. NEC Harlequins |
| (England) Michael Swift | 15 December 2006 v. Montpellier |
| (Ireland) Andrew Farley | 31 December 2006 v. Munster |
| (Ireland) Mark McHugh | 4 May 2007 v. Newport Gwent Dragons |
| (Ireland) Conor McPhillips | 21 September 2007 v. Newport Gwent Dragons |
| (Ireland) Colm Rigney | 9 November 2007 v. Brive |
| (Ireland) John Fogarty | 16 December 2007 v. Newcastle Falcons |
| (Ireland) John Muldoon | 5 September 2008 v. Ospreys |
| (Ireland) Brett Wilkinson | 9 October 2010 v. Cavalieri Prato |
| (Ireland) Gavin Duffy | 19 November 2010 v. Ospreys |
| (Ireland) Johnny O'Connor | 12 December 2010 v. Harlequins |
| (Ireland) Mike McCarthy | 15 January 2011 v. Bayonne |
| (Ireland) Keith Matthews | 1 April 2011 v. Edinburgh |
| (Ireland) Adrian Flavin | 1 April 2011 v. Edinburgh |
| (Samoa) Ray Ofisa | 2 December 2011 v. Benetton Treviso |
| (Ireland) Ronan Loughney | 2 March 2012 v. Scarlets |
| (Ireland) Frank Murphy | 27 December 2013 v. Munster |
| (Ireland) Andrew Browne | 4 January 2014 v. Leinster |
| (Ireland) Fionn Carr | 25 October 2014 v. Exeter Chiefs |

| Player | Date of 100th cap |
|---|---|
| (New Zealand) George Naoupu | 25 April 2015 v. Glasgow Warriors |
| (Ireland) Rodney Ah You | 24 May 2015 v. Gloucester |
| (Ireland) Kieran Marmion | 7 May 2016 v. Glasgow Warriors |
| (Ireland) **Tiernan O'Halloran** | 7 May 2016 v. Glasgow Warriors |
| (Ireland) **Denis Buckley** | 25 November 2016 v. Cardiff Blues |
| (Ireland) Eoin McKeon | 7 January 2017 v. Ospreys |
| (Ireland) Matt Healy | 6 January 2018 v. Munster |
| (Ireland) **Finlay Bealham** | 16 February 2018 v. Zebre |
| (Ireland) **Jack Carty** | 31 March 2018 v. Gloucester |
| (Ireland) **Dave Heffernan** | 31 March 2018 v. Gloucester |
| (Ireland) Eoin Griffin | 3 November 2018 v. Dragons |
| (New Zealand) Tom McCartney | 22 March 2019 v. Benetton |
| (Ireland) **Caolin Blade** | 23 November 2019 v. Toulouse |
| (Ireland) Quinn Roux | 21 December 2019 v. Munster |
| (Ireland) **Bundee Aki** | 23 August 2020 v. Ulster |
| (Ireland) Ultan Dillane | 22 November 2020 v. Zebre |
| (Ireland) Eoghan Masterson | 27 December 2020 v. Ulster |
| (Ireland) **Shane Delahunt** | 4 June 2021 v. Ospreys |
| (Ireland) **Jarrad Butler** | 29 October 2022 v. Ospreys |
| (Ireland) **Tom Farrell** | 21 October 2023 v. Ospreys |
| (Ireland) **Paul Boyle** | 7 December 2024 v. Zebre |

Correct as of 15 December 2024

== Connacht Eagles ==

Connacht Eagles (formerly Connacht A) is the province's second-tier side. The Eagles represented Connacht in the semi-professional British and Irish Cup. The British and Irish Cup was discontinued after the 2017–18 season and replaced with the Celtic Cup, featuring 'A' teams from Irish and Welsh Pro14 teams. In addition to their cup commitments, the Eagles compete in an Irish Interprovincial series against the 'A' teams from Leinster, Munster and Ulster. During the amateur era, and early in the advent of professionalism, the main Connacht team competed in the Interprovincial Championship. Since the inception of the Celtic League however, the provinces have fielded lesser teams in order to concentrate on their league and European games. The side is generally composed of senior Connacht squad players requiring gametime, academy players and All-Ireland League players called up from their clubs. The team is currently coached by academy coach Mossy Lawler.

== Captains in the professional era ==
| Player | Years |
|---|---|
| (Ireland) Kevin Devlin | 1996–1997 |
| (Ireland) Graham Heaslip | 1997–1998 |
| (Ireland) Eric Elwood | 1998–2000 |
| (Ireland) Mark McConnell | 2000–2002 |
| (New Zealand) Tim Allnutt | 2002–2004 |
| (Ireland) Andrew Farley | 2004–2006 |
| (Ireland) John Fogarty | 2006–2007 |
| (Ireland) Andrew Farley | 2007–2008 |
| (Ireland) John Muldoon | 2008–2011 |

| Player | Years |
|---|---|
| (Ireland) Gavin Duffy | 2011–2013 |
| (Ireland) G. Duffy; (Ireland) J. Muldoon; (England) M. Swift | 2013 |
| (New Zealand) Craig Clarke | 2013–2014 |
| (Ireland) John Muldoon | 2014–2018 |
| (Australia) Jarrad Butler | 2018–2021 |
| (Ireland) Jack Carty | 2021–2024 |
| (Ireland) Cian Prendergast | 2024– |

== See also ==
- United Rugby Championship
- European Rugby Champions Cup
- European Rugby Challenge Cup
- History of rugby union matches between Connacht and Ulster
- History of rugby union matches between Leinster and Connacht
- History of rugby union matches between Munster and Connacht

== Sources ==
- IRFU Annual Report 2007–08
- IRFU Annual Report 2006–07
- IRFU Annual Report 2005–06
- IRFU Annual Report 2004–05
