= Aengus McMorrow =

Ireland international rugby union player

- Born: 6 November 1927 (age 99) County Sligo, Ireland
- School: Terenure College

Rugby union career
- Position: Fullback
International career
Years	Team	Apps	(Points)
1951	Ireland	1	(0)

Aengus McMorrow (born 6 November 1927) is an Irish former international rugby union player.

A native of County Sligo, McMorrow hailed from Crossboy near Ballintogher and attended Terenure College.

McMorrow played rugby for Garryowen and was first Connacht native to be capped for Ireland, deputising injured fullback George Norton for their final match of the 1951 Five Nations against Wales at Cardiff Arms Park. Ireland needed a win to secure the grand slam, but were held to a 3–3 draw.

Prior to his Ireland cap, McMorrow was best known as a Gaelic footballer, playing for Sligo county team in the Connacht Championship during the mid-1940s.

McMorrow was an executive with Aer Lingus.

== See also ==
- List of Ireland national rugby union players
