= 1996–97 French Rugby Union Championship =

- Countries: France
- Champions: Toulouse (14th title)
- Runners-up: Bourgoin
- Relegated: Nîmes, Périgueux, PUC, Dijon

The 1996–97 French Rugby Union Championship was played by 20 teams

Stade Toulousain won their 14th title, beating Bourgoin in the final.

== Preliminary round ==
The 20 team were divided in the preliminary phase in two pools of 10. The first eight team of each pool were admitted to "Round of 16". The last two were relegated in second division.

=== Pool 1 ===
Pos	Team	Pts
1	Bourgoin	45
2	Agen	43
3	Toulouse	42
4	Dax	42
5	Castres	40
6	Biarritz	37
7	Grenoble	32
8	Béziers	30
9	Nîmes	25
10	Périgueux	24

=== Pool 2 ===
Pos	Team	Pts
1	Brive	43
2	Montferrand	41
3	Perpignan	41
4	Pau	39
5	Bègles-Bordeaux	38
6	Narbonne	38
7	Toulon	38
8	Colomiers	36
9	Paris Université Club	24
10	Dijon	22

== Last 16 ==
may ‘97	Toulouse	-	Narbonne	24–22
may ‘97	Brive	-	Colomiers	31–36
may ‘97	Grenoble	-	Agen	27–27
may ‘97	Perpignan	-	Bordeaux-Begles	26–29
may ‘97	Bourgoin	-	Beziers	23–14
may ‘97	Pau	-	Castres	23–20
may ‘97	Montferrand	-	Toulon	12–6
may ‘97	Dax	-	Biarritz	22–18

== Last 8 ==
may ‘97	Toulouse	-	Colomiers	21–12
may ‘97	Agen	-	Bordeaux-Begles	22–18
may ‘97	Bourgoin	-	Pau	24–18
may ‘97	Montferrand	-	Dax	22–18

== Semifinals ==
may ‘97	Toulouse	-	Agen	23–16
may ‘97	Bourgoin	-	Montferrand	21–17

== Final ==
31 May 1997

Toulouse	12 – 6	Bourgoin
Pen: Deylaud (3); Drop: Deylaud		Pen: Geany (2)

Parc des Princes, Paris
Referee: Daniel Gillet

FB	15	(France) Stéphane Ougier
RW	14	(France) Michel Marfaing
OC	13	(France) Nicolas Martin	(substituted off) 80+2'
IC	12	(France) Thomas Castaignède
LW	11	(France) David Berty
FH	10	(France) Christophe Deylaud (c)
SH	9	(France) Jérôme Cazalbou
N8	8	(France) Sylvain Dispagne
OF	7	(France) Régis Sonnes
BF	6	(France) Didier Lacroix
RL	5	(France) Franck Belot
LL	4	(France) Hugues Miorin
TP	3	(France) Jean-Louis Jordana	(substituted off) 66'
HK	2	(France) Patrick Soula
LP	1	(France) Christian Califano
Substitutions:
HK	16	(France) Philippe Capelleri
PR	17	(France) Pascal Lasserre	(substituted on) 66'
LK	18	(France) David Couzinet
FL	19	(France) Jean-Marie Bisaro
SH	20	(France) Julien Tilloles
CE	21	(France) Olivier Carbonneau	(substituted on) 80+2'
FB	22	(France) Xavier Garbajosa
Coach:
(France) Guy Novès

FB	15	(New Zealand) Nigel Geany
RW	14	(France) Laurent Leflamand
OC	13	(France) Alexandre Péclier
IC	12	(France) Stéphane Glas	(substituted off) 24'
LW	11	(France) Ludovic Saunier
FH	10	(France) Gilles Cassagne
SH	9	(France) Dominique Mazille
N8	8	(France) Pierre Raschi	(substituted off) 72'
OF	7	(France) Michel Malafosse
BF	6	(France) Alexandre Chazalet
RL	5	(France) Jean Daudé	(substituted off) 59'
LL	4	(France) Marc Cécillon (c)
TP	3	(New Zealand) David Morgan	(substituted off) 51'
HK	2	(France) Jean-Pierre Sanchez
LP	1	(France) Philippe Vessiller
Substitutions:
HK	16	(France) Jean-François Martin-Culet
PR	17	(France) Laurent Gomez	(substituted on) 51'
LK	18	(France) Frédéric Nibelle	(substituted on) 59'
N8	19	(France) Julien Frier	(substituted on) 72'
SH	20	(France) Nicolas Guilhot
CE	21	(France) Pascal Fernandez	(substituted on) 24'
WG	22	(France) Laurent Belligoi
Coach:
(France) Michel Couturas
