= Sébastien Chabal =

France international rugby union player (born 1977)

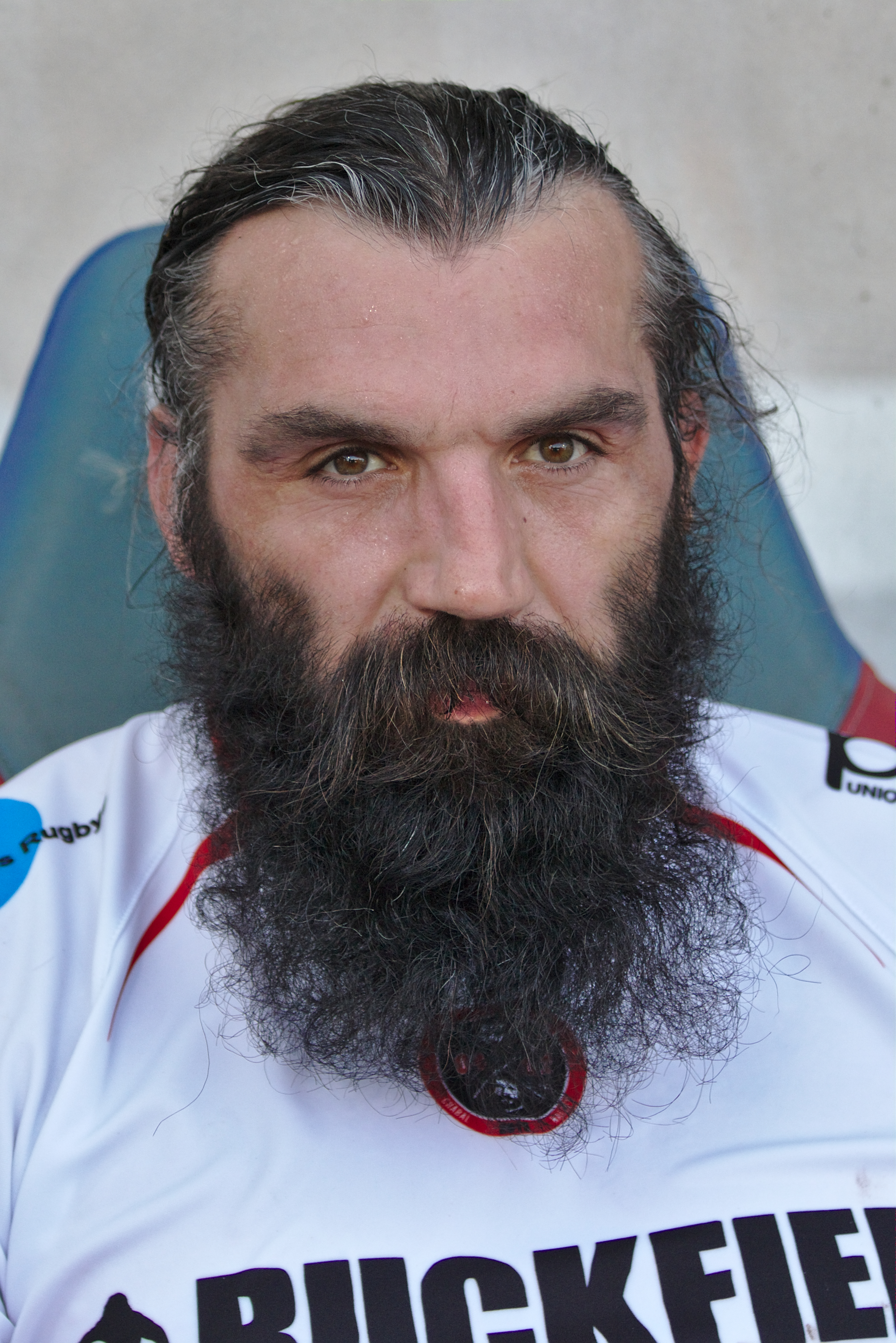
- Born: 8 December 1977 (age 48) Valence, France
- Height: 1.91 m (6 ft 3 in)
- Weight: 113 kg (249 lb; 17 st 11 lb)

Rugby union career
- Position(s): Number eight, Lock, Flanker
Senior career
Years	Team	Apps	(Points)
2000–2004	Bourgoin	45	(35)
2004–2009	Sale Sharks	101	(60)
2009–2012	Racing Métro	57	(30)
2012–2014	Lyon	18	(15)
International career
Years	Team	Apps	(Points)
2000–2011	France	62	(30)

Sébastien Chabal (born 8 December 1977) is a French former rugby union player. He played number eight and lock for Bourgoin (1998–2004), Sale Sharks (2004–2009), Racing Métro 92 Paris (2009 – February 2012), and for the French national team.

Chabal played professionally for 16 years and won the English Premiership with Sale, and the 2007 Six Nations Championship with France. He also finished in fourth place at the 2007 Rugby World Cup. He earned his first international cap on 4 March 2000 against Scotland, and represented France in 62 games.

He is known for his full beard, long hair and ferocious tackling, leading the French rugby fans to nickname him l'Homme des Cavernes (Caveman). With this look, he has a number of lucrative commercial contracts. He was one of the most popular sportsmen in France, so much that local journalists wrote about Chabalmania.

== Personal life ==
Born on 8 December 1977 in Valence, Drôme, Chabal grew up in Beaumont-lès-Valence in the Drôme department in southeast France. His modest family was originally from Ardèche. His father worked in a garage and his mother worked in a jewellery store. Passionate about mechanical works, he attended a Lycée professionnel where he studied for and obtained a brevet d'études professionnelles in mechanics. He then worked as a milling machine operator in a Salmson factory in Crest. While working in Crest, he played rugby for the amateur club in Beauvallon. When he joined Valence Sportif, he left his factory job and became a professional rugby union player.

While playing for Bourgoin-Jallieu, he married Annick and became stepfather to her daughter who was born in 1994. In 2005, he welcomed the birth of his daughter Lily-Rose.

Chabal is a member of the 'Champions for Peace' club, a group of 54 famous athletes committed to serving peace in the world through sport, created by Monaco-based international organization Peace and Sport.

In 2025, Chabal admitted that he has no recollection of his entire playing career and most of his childhood due to repeated concussions. Due to this, he also finds it pointless to see a doctor, as it is impossible to recover his lost memories.

== Playing career ==
=== Early years ===
Chabal first tried rugby at the age of nine, but gave it up after just two months. However, he again tried his hand at rugby when he was sixteen, by following two friends who played for the local club in Beauvallon. This time, he discovered a passion for the game, and the camaraderie that follows matches.

He quickly made his way up, through the French league system. First with Valence Sportif who played in the Fédérale 2, the fourth division of French rugby, and then with CS Bourgoin-Jallieu in 1998 who played in the top flight. Here, he played as a flanker as his preferred position of number eight was taken by Pierre Raschi. With Bourgoin-Jallieu, Chabal played at the highest level of French domestic rugby, European club rugby and from here gained his first international cap for France. Moreover, at Bourgoin-Jallieu he played with the golden generation of players from the club's youth system such as Lionel Nallet, Julien Bonnaire, Olivier Milloud, Pascal Papé, and Benjamin Boyet. However, he did not win any trophies during this time although he played in the semi-final of the French Championship during the 2003–2004 season. He also played on the losing side in the 1998–99 European Challenge Cup final, the final of the Challenge Yves du Manoir in 1999, the final of the League Cup in 2003 and the final of the Challenge Sud-Radio in 2003.

On 11 October 2002, during the group stages of the 2002–2003 Heineken Cup, Bourgoin, with Chabal, defeated Sale Sharks 18–24 at Edgeley Park, the home of Sale Sharks. During this match, Jason Robinson received a yellow card for the first time in his career following a tackle from Chabal. In the return match, Bourgoin again defeated Sale, but finished second in their group to Biarritz Olympique as they had scored fewer tries.

During the 2003–2004 Heineken Cup, Chabal and Bourgoin played against Munster and Gloucester in the group stage. On 6 December 2003, Bourgoin lost their first match at home against the Irish province 17–18. Chabal scored the only try of the encounter, but Ronan O'Gara scored six penalty kicks. One week later, Bourgoin suffered a heavy defeat away at the hands of Gloucester 49–13, with Chabal again scoring the only try for his team. Bourgoin lost against Gloucester at home, and lost five of six matches during their 2003–2004 European campaign, finishing third in their pool and were eliminated from the competition. On 25 January 2004, the head coach of Bourgoin, Philippe Saint-André, was sacked after he applied for the position of head coach of the Welsh national team, left vacant following the departure of Steve Hansen. The ambitious plan for Bourgoin initiated by Laurent Seigne under the direction of Pierre Martinet and Patrick Sébastien had ended.

=== English experience ===
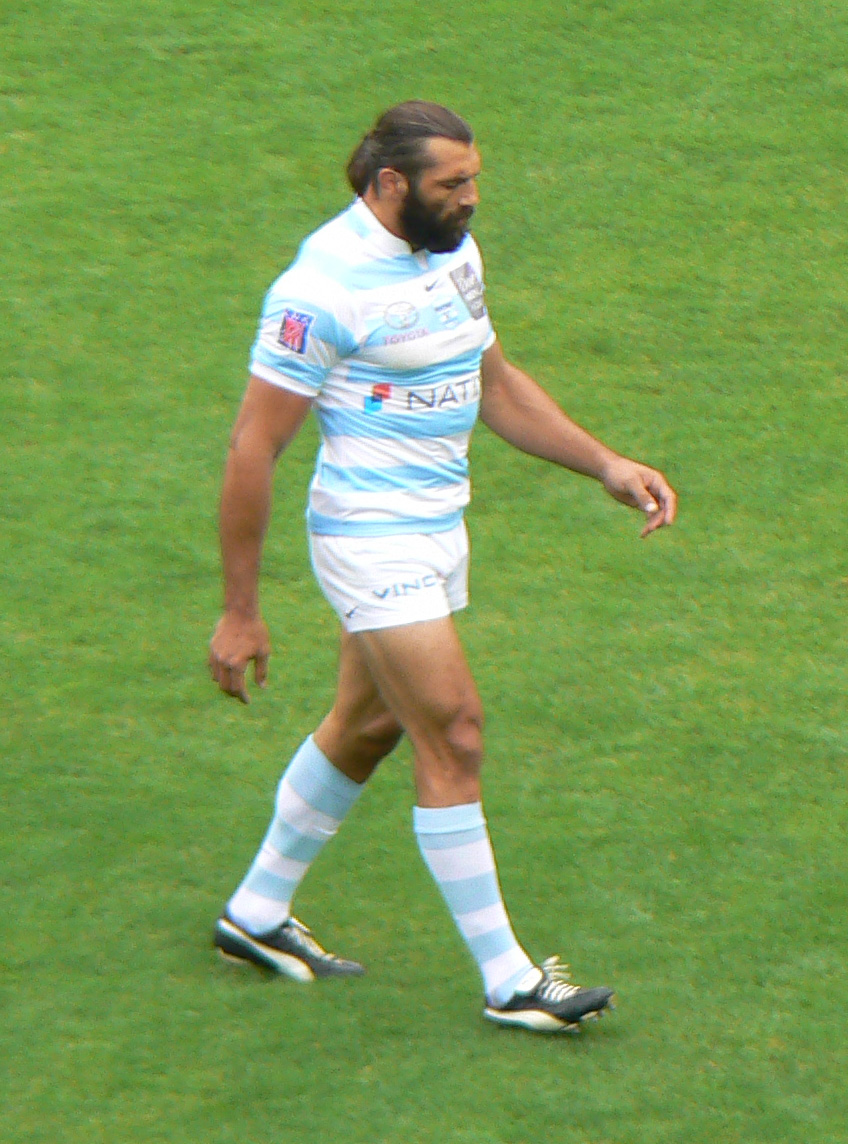
Sebastien Chabal on for Racing Metro 92, 2009.

Following the departure of Saint-André, and after six years wearing the blue jersey of Bourgoin, Chabal wanted to change his horizons and continue his professional development as a player at another club. He wished to join Stade Toulousain, but the club of the Ville Rose made no offer for his services. However, Saint-André, now sporting director at Sale Sharks, signed him on a two-year contract with the Manchester outfit. Although Chabal had played at flanker throughout his time at Bourgoin, Saint-André selected him at number eight in his first match for Sale.

The 2004–2005 English Premiership marked the return of Sale Sharks to the country's top flight under the guidance of Saint-André. In their first two matches of the season, Sale, with Chabal, won against both Leicester Tigers and London Wasps, the favourites for the title that year. The English club won the 2004–05 European Challenge Cup beating Pau 27–3 in the final. This was the first title won by Chabal. The Sharks lost their 2004–05 domestic league semi-final 43–22 against the eventual victors London Wasps, despite a try from Chabal, but finished the season in third place, securing their place in the 2005–06 Heineken Cup. By the end of the season, Chabal had made the position of Sharks No. 8 his own.

Chabal's second season with the English outfit brought more success. First, Sale reached the quarter-finals of the 2005–2006 Heineken Cup losing to Biarritz Olympique. Earlier in the group stages, Chabal was the victim of a gang tackle by Paul O'Connell and Anthony Foley during Sale's group-deciding match against Munster at Thomond Park. Chabal had only just caught a Ronan O'Gara restart when he was hit hard and driven back into his teams 22. The tackle was to turn the match in Munster's favour and established something of a stigma for Chabal against the Irish province (as he would be hit hard a number times by Munster centre Lifeimi Mafi in a match during the 2008–2009 season again with a crowd-pleasing outcome). Nevertheless, back in the English league, Sale won the 2005–06 Guinness Premiership by beating London Wasps 22–12 in the semi-final before defeating Leicester Tigers 45–20 in the final. With his two-year contract now up, Chabal turned down an offer to join Stade Toulousain and extended his contract with the Sharks for a further year.

The 2006–2007 season was not as successful as 2005–2006. Sale finished sixth in the Guinness Premiership and were eliminated in the group stages of the Heineken Cup. However, during the group stages of the Heineken Cup, Sale played against Stade Français and during the match in Paris, Chabal scored an interception try from Agustín Pichot, running 50 metres to the line. Following this performance, Chabal was selected for the French national side for the 2007 Six Nations Championship.

The 2007–2008 season was met with more success than the 2006–07, with victories against some of the best teams in the domestic championship, but a home defeat to London Irish on the last day of the regular season confined Sale to finishing the season in fifth place. However, this guaranteed them a place in the 2008–09 Heineken Cup having played in the 2007–08 European Challenge Cup. During the quarter-final of the European Challenge Cup against CA Brive, Chabal scored the first of six tries for the English side, but injured his knee. This injury forced him out of action for one month, during which Sale lost 36–14 to Bath Rugby in the semi-finals. In December 2007, Chabal extended his contract with Sale for a further two years.

For the 2008–2009 season, Saint-André started playing Chabal in the second row instead of his more usual position of No. 8 or flanker. During the group stages of the Heineken Cup, Sale were grouped with Munster and Clermont, losing against both and depriving Sale and Chabal from the final phases of the competition. In the domestic competition, Sale were on course for a place in the playoffs, but not for a European competition place. However, in the penultimate game of the regular season, Chabal scored an important try that gave Sale an important bonus point and a place in the European competition. Despite this, during the last day of the regular season, although Sale won their match, results elsewhere led to Sale missing out on the play-offs and terminating the season for Chabal.

Philippe Saint-André had announced in December 2008 that he was to leave Sale Sharks at the end of the 2008–09 season with Kingsley Jones named as his successor. Chabal had already announced that he wished to return to play in France, his family had already left England in September 2008.

=== Return to France ===
After five years at Sale, Chabal officially signed a three-year contract with the French club Racing Métro 92 in April 2009. The French club were recently promoted to the Top 14 in 2009 after winning the 2008–2009 Pro D2 with three rounds to spare. They also signed Lionel Nallet and the South African's François Steyn and Jacques Cronjé. Racing enjoyed success in their return to the top flight, claiming the sixth and final slot in the newly expanded Top 14 playoffs, where they narrowly lost in the first round at eventual champions Clermont. Racing's sixth-place finish also gave them a berth in the 2010–11 Heineken Cup. In September 2010, it was reported that Chabal was the highest-paid rugby player in the world, earning a reported €1 million per year.

Shane Richardson, Chief Executive of the South Sydney Rabbitohs, an Australian rugby league club revealed the club had contacted Chabal's management to inquire about the possibility to switch codes, where he would play "a portion of his season with the club." The club were unsuccessful in their attempts to pursue Chabal.

During the 2012–2013 and 2013–2014 seasons Chabal played for Lyon. He finished his playing career on a high in May 2014 by helping Lyon being promoted to the top division.

== International career ==
Although Chabal is primarily a back-row player, former France coach Bernard Laporte frequently used him as a lock. In a 2007 interview, Chabal said that Laporte called him just before the France squad was announced for the 2007 Rugby World Cup and told him, "I really want to pick you but to play second row." Chabal accepted Laporte's offer.

At France's loss to England in the semi-final of the 2007 Rugby World Cup, Chabal was visibly distraught, as they failed to make it to the final.

Chabal was not included in Les Bleus squad for the 2008 Six Nations Championship. He expressed a desire to continue to represent his country, and believed that omission from the June tour to Australia would indicate that he was out of reckoning for France's 2011 World Cup preparations. On 9 June 2008 he was recalled to the France squad for their Australian tour. He was selected in the French squad for the 2008 Autumn internationals. He was called once again for the 2009 Six Nations Championship.

In May 2011 Chabal was left out of France's provisional 32-man squad for the 2011 Rugby World Cup.

== Other appearances ==
In February 2012, Chabal made an appearance with Balmain Rugby Union from Sydney for one game against Petersham Rugby Club at ANZ Stadium. The game featured as a curtain raiser to the Round 1 Super Rugby game between the NSW Waratahs and Queensland Reds. Chabal's appearance created a media hype in both Australia and France. In the game, Chabal scored the last try for Balmain, winning 19–5.

In January 2014, Chabal appeared in an advertising campaign for an online currency exchange company CurrencyFair as the "Currency Fairy".

He is a member of the 'Champions for Peace' club, a Monaco-based international organization with Prince Albert II as patron. The aim of the organisation is to make sport a tool for dialogue and social cohesion.
