= European Rugby Cup =

Former governing body of two European rugby union club tournaments

- Sport: Rugby union
- Founded: 1995
- Chairman: Jean-Pierre Lux
- CEO: Derek McGrath
- Closure date: 2014

European Rugby Cup Ltd (or ERC) was the governing body and organiser of the two major European rugby union club tournaments: the Heineken Cup and the Amlin Challenge Cup. It was replaced by the European Professional Club Rugby governing body in 2014.

The inaugural Heineken Cup competition was held in 1995–96, with the second-tier competition established the following season.

== History ==
The organisation was established in 1995, in preparation for the 1995–96 season, and was headquartered in Dublin. ERC's had nine major shareholders: the six tier 1 unions and three club associations, which were all represented on the board of directors:

Unions

- Rugby Football Union
- Fédération Française de Rugby
- Irish Rugby Football Union
- Scottish Rugby Union
- Welsh Rugby Union
- Federazione Italiana Rugby

Club associations

- Premiership Rugby
- Ligue Nationale de Rugby
- Regional Rugby Wales

In 2012, Premiership Rugby and LNR, on behalf of the English and French clubs respectively, notified ERC that they would be withdrawing from the accord governing the competition, being dissatisfied with the organisation of the competition and the distribution of funding. Premiership Rugby subsequently refused to join any new agreement in which ERC remained organisers of European rugby tournaments.

In April 2014 the nine shareholders with an interest in continuing major European club competition came to an agreement for new competitions. Under the new agreement, ERC was wound up, and a new body, European Professional Club Rugby (EPCR), was created to organise three new competitions, European Rugby Champions Cup, the European Rugby Challenge Cup, and the third tier Qualifying Competition, beginning with the 2014–15 season.

== ERC Governance ==
The Board of ERC, which oversaw the implementation of ERC's strategy for the development of European club rugby, was made up of representatives of the six shareholder unions, league bodies and club representatives and shaped the strategy and development of ERC and the tournaments.

Reporting to and making recommendation the Board were a series of ERC Committees, focusing on the various roles of ERC as a Governing Body and Tournament Organiser and these drew on the experience and expertise of the clubs and Unions from each participation nation.

ERC Committee Structure: – ERC Commercial Committee – ERC Rugby Committee – ERC Match Officials Committee – ERC Disciplinary Committee – ERC Finance and Audit Committee

The ERC Executive and team of 20 employees was based in the Dublin headquarters and were charged with implementing the strategy for the development of European club rugby and management of the two tournaments and of the showpiece ERC Finals weekend.

== ERC European Player of the Year ==
Recognised as one of the most prestigious individual accolades in the game, the ERC European Player of the Year honoured the best player of the European club rugby season from both the Heineken Cup and Amlin Challenge Cup tournaments.

In 2010 ERC launched the ERC15 Awards, recognising the outstanding contributors to the first decade and a half of European competition. The inaugural recipient of the ERC European Player Award, as the best player over the first 15 years of these tournaments, was Munster Rugby's Ronan O'Gara. For the 2010/11 season, ERC moved to present an annual award.

Steffon Armitage, from Toulon, was named ERC European Player of the Year in 2014.

Winners:
Ronan O'Gara (Munster Rugby) – 2010 (Awarded for the previous 15 seasons)
Seán O'Brien (Leinster Rugby) 2011
Rob Kearney (Leinster Rugby) 2012
Jonny Wilkinson (Toulon) 2013
Steffon Armitage (Toulon) 2014
Nick Abendanon (Clermont) 2015

== ERC Elite Awards ==
To celebrate the 10th anniversary season of the Heineken Cup, the ERC Elite Awards scheme was introduced to recognise the most prominent teams and players of the competitions.

=== Teams with 50 or more appearances ===
| Team | Appearances |
|---|---|
| (Ireland) Munster | 138 |
| (France) Toulouse | 138 |
| (Ireland) Leinster | 128 |
| (England) Leicester Tigers | 124 |
| (Wales) Scarlets (Note: Includes 48 appearances as Llanelli RFC before the introduction of regional rugby union teams in Wales) | 117 |
| (Ireland) Ulster | 117 |
| (Wales) Cardiff Blues (Note: Includes 44 appearances as Cardiff RFC before the introduction of regional rugby union teams in Wales) | 114 |
| (Scotland) Edinburgh | 103 |
| (Italy) Benetton | 96 |
| (France) Biarritz Olympique | 92 |
| (Scotland) Glasgow Warriors | 91 |
| (England) Northampton Saints | 83 |
| (France) Perpignan | 81 |
| (France) Stade Français | 79 |
| (England) London Wasps | 78 |
| (France) Montferrand/Clermont Auvergne | 76 |
| (England) Bath | 72 |
| (Wales) Ospreys | 69 |
| (England) Harlequins | 68 |
| (France) Castres Olympique | 64 |
| (England) Gloucester | 64 |
| (England) Saracens | 56 |

=== Players with 100 or more Heineken Cup caps ===
| Player | Club(s) | Appearances |
|---|---|---|
| (Ireland) Cian Healy | Leinster | 111 |
| (Ireland) Ronan O'Gara | Munster | 110 |
| (Ireland) Gordon D′Arcy | Leinster | 104 |
| (Ireland) John Hayes | Munster | 101 |
| (Ireland) Peter Stringer | Munster, Saracens, Bath | 100 |

=== Players with 50 or more Heineken Cup caps ===
| Player | Club(s) | Appearances |
|---|---|---|
| (Ireland) Ronan O'Gara | Munster | 110 |
| (Ireland) John Hayes | Munster | 101 |
| (Ireland) Peter Stringer | Munster, Saracens, Bath | 100 |
| (Ireland) Gordon D'Arcy | Leinster | 98 |
| (Ireland) Donncha O'Callaghan | Munster | 96 |
| (Ireland) Leo Cullen | Leinster, Leicester Tigers, Leinster (2nd stint) | 92 |
| (Ireland) Shane Horgan | Leinster | 87 |
| (Ireland) Brian O'Driscoll | Leinster | 87 |
| (France) Clément Poitrenaud | Toulouse | 87 |
| (Ireland) Anthony Foley | Munster | 86 |
| (Ireland) David Wallace | Munster | 86 |
| (Scotland) Nathan Hines | Edinburgh, Perpignan, Leinster, Clermont Auvergne | 85 |
| (France) Jean Bouilhou | Toulouse | 84 |
| (Ireland) Marcus Horan | Munster | 84 |
| (Wales) Stephen Jones | Llanelli, Scarlets, Clermont Auvergne, Scarlets (2nd stint) | 84 |
| (France) Fabien Pelous | Dax, Toulouse | 81 |
| (Wales) Martyn Williams | Pontypridd, Cardiff, Cardiff Blues | 81 |
| (France) Yannick Jauzion | Colomiers, Toulouse | 79 |
| (Ireland) Alan Quinlan | Munster | 78 |
| (France) Sylvain Marconnet | Stade Français, Biarritz | 76 |
| (Ireland) Paul O'Connell | Munster | 76 |
| (France) Julien Peyrelongue | Biarritz | 75 |
| (Wales) Ian Gough | Pontypridd, Newport, Newport Gwent Dragons, Ospreys | 74 |
| (Ireland) Geordan Murphy | Leicester Tigers | 74 |
| (Ireland) Malcolm O'Kelly | Leinster | 74 |
| (France) Jean-Baptiste Poux | Toulouse | 74 |
| (France) William Servat | Toulouse | 74 |
| (France) Vincent Clerc | Toulouse | 73 |
| (Scotland) Allan Jacobsen | Edinburgh | 72 |
| (Italy) Martin Castrogiovanni | Calvisano, Leicester Tigers | 71 |
| (France) Cédric Heymans | Brive, Toulouse | 71 |
| (Ireland) Shane Jennings | Leinster, Leicester Tigers, Leinster (2nd stint) | 71 |
| (France) Jérôme Thion | Montferrand, Perpignan, Biarritz | 71 |
| (Wales) Vernon Cooper | Llanelli, Scarlets | 70 |
| (France) Florian Fritz | Bourgoin, Toulouse | 70 |
| (England) Simon Shaw | London Wasps | 70 |
| (England) Martin Corry | Leicester Tigers | 69 |
| (England) Louis Deacon | Leicester Tigers | 68 |
| (Ireland) Girvan Dempsey | Leinster | 68 |
| (England) George Chuter | Saracens, Leicester Tigers | 67 |
| (Ireland) John Kelly | Munster | 67 |
| (France) Grégory Lamboley | Toulouse | 67 |
| (France) Nicolas Mas | Perpignan | 67 |
| (Scotland) Chris Paterson | Edinburgh, Gloucester, Edinburgh (2nd stint) | 67 |
| (Ireland) Jamie Heaslip | Leinster | 66 |
| (Wales) Adam Jones | Neath, Ospreys | 66 |
| (Wales) Duncan Jones | Neath, Ospreys | 66 |
| (Ireland) Eoin Reddan | Munster, London Wasps, Leinster | 66 |
| (France) David Skrela | Colomiers, Stade Français, Toulouse, Clermont Auvergne | 66 |
| (Wales) Chris Wyatt | Llanelli, Scarlets, Bourgoin | 66 |
| (England) Ben Kay | Leicester Tigers | 65 |
| (France) Julien Bonnaire | Bourgoin, Clermont Auvergne | 64 |
| (France) Yannick Bru | Toulouse | 64 |
| (France) Nicolas Brusque | Pau, Biarritz | 64 |
| (France) Romain Millo-Chluski | Toulouse | 64 |
| (France) Dimitri Yachvili | Biarritz | 63 |
| (France) Benoît August | Stade Français, Biarritz | 62 |
| (Ireland) Mick O'Driscoll | Munster, Perpignan, Munster (2nd stint) | 62 |
| (Wales) Iestyn Thomas | Ebbw Vale, Llanelli, Scarlets | 62 |
| (Ireland) Shane Byrne | Leinster, Saracens | 61 |
| (Ireland) Reggie Corrigan | Leinster | 61 |
| (France) Thierry Dusautoir | Biarritz, Toulouse | 61 |
| (Scotland) Dougie Hall | Edinburgh, Glasgow Warriors | 60 |
| (Wales) Dafydd James | Pontypridd, Llanelli, Bridgend, Celtic Warriors, Harlequins, Scarlets, Cardiff Blues | 60 |
| (Wales) Gethin Jenkins | Celtic Warriors, Cardiff Blues | 60 |
| (France) Benjamin Kayser | Stade Français, Leicester Tigers, Stade Français (2nd stint), Castres Olympique, Clermont Auvergne | 60 |
| (France) Christian Labit | Toulouse, Northampton Saints | 60 |
| (Wales) Gareth Thomas | Cardiff, Bridgend, Celtic Warriors, Toulouse, Cardiff Blues | 60 |
| (Ireland) Andrew Trimble | Ulster | 60 |
| (England) Iain Balshaw | Bath, Gloucester, Biarritz | 59 |
| (England) Steve Borthwick | Bath, Saracens | 59 |
| (France) Frédéric Michalak | Toulouse, Toulon | 59 |
| (England) Lewis Moody | Leicester Tigers, Bath | 59 |
| (England) Graham Rowntree | Leicester Tigers | 59 |
| (England) Perry Freshwater | Leicester Tigers, Perpignan | 58 |
| (Italy) Salvatore Perugini | L'Aquila, Calvisano, Toulouse, Aironi | 58 |
| (Ireland) Trevor Brennan | Leinster, Toulouse | 57 |
| (Ireland) Victor Costello | Leinster | 57 |
| (Ireland) Justin Fitzpatrick | Ulster, Castres Olympique, Ulster (2nd stint) | 57 |
| (Ireland) David Humphreys | Ulster | 57 |
| (Wales) Jonathan Thomas | Swansea, Ospreys | 57 |
| (Wales) Shane Williams | Neath, Ospreys | 57 |
| (Ireland) Roger Wilson | Ulster, Northampton Saints, Ulster (2nd stint) | 57 |
| (England) Joe Worsley | London Wasps | 57 |
| (France) Philippe Bidabé | Biarritz | 56 |
| (Ireland) Simon Easterby | Llanelli, Scarlets | 56 |
| (Ireland) Anthony Horgan | Munster | 56 |
| (Wales) Gavin Thomas | Bath, Ospreys, Scarlets, Newport Gwent Dragons | 56 |
| (France) David Auradou | Stade Français | 55 |
| (France) Serge Betsen | Biarritz, London Wasps | 55 |
| (Ireland) Tommy Bowe | Ulster, Ospreys, Ulster (2nd stint) | 55 |
| (Wales) Robin McBryde | Llanelli, Scarlets | 55 |
| (France) Yannick Nyanga | Béziers, Toulouse | 55 |
| (South Africa) Shaun Payne | Swansea, Munster | 55 |
| (Ireland) Frankie Sheahan | Munster | 55 |
| (France) Damien Traille | Pau, Biarritz | 55 |
| (Wales) Garan Evans | Llanelli, Scarlets | 54 |
| (Ireland) Denis Hickie | Leinster | 54 |
| (France) Benoît Lecouls | Toulouse, Biarritz, Toulouse (2nd stint) | 54 |
| (England) Tom Voyce | Bath, London Wasps, Gloucester | 54 |
| (Ireland) Paddy Wallace | Ulster | 54 |
| (Scotland) Jason White | Glasgow, Sale Sharks, Clermont Auvergne | 54 |
| (Ireland) Isaac Boss | Ulster, Leinster | 53 |
| (England) Lawrence Dallaglio | London Wasps | 53 |
| (England) Austin Healey | Leicester Tigers | 53 |
| (England) Alex King | London Wasps, Clermont | 53 |
| (England) Leon Lloyd | Leicester Tigers, Gloucester | 53 |
| (Italy) Mauro Bergamasco | Petrarca, Benetton Treviso, Stade Français, Aironi; Zebre | 52 |
| (Scotland) Kelly Brown | Borders, Glasgow Warriors, Saracens | 52 |
| (France) Pieter de Villiers | Stade Français | 52 |
| (France) Vincent Debaty | Perpignan, Clermont Auvergne | 52 |
| (France) Imanol Harinordoquy | Pau, Biarritz Olympique | 52 |
| (Wales) Deiniol Jones | Bridgend, Celtic Warriors, Cardiff Blues | 52 |
| (Ireland) Rob Kearney | Leinster | 52 |
| (Ireland) Eric Miller | Leinster, Leicester Tigers, Ulster, Leinster (2nd stint) | 52 |
| (France) Aurélien Rougerie | Clermont Auvergne | 52 |
| (Argentina) Rimas Álvarez Kairelis | Perpignan | 51 |
| (England) Peter Buxton | Newport, Gloucester | 51 |
| (Wales) Lee Byrne | Scarlets, Ospreys, Clermont Auvergne | 51 |
| (England) Ben Cohen | Northampton Saints, Sale Sharks | 51 |
| (Wales) John Davies | Neath, Llanelli, Scarlets | 51 |
| (England) Martin Johnson | Leicester Tigers | 51 |
| (Scotland) Al Kellock | Edinburgh, Glasgow Warriors | 51 |
| (Scotland) Scott Murray | Saracens, Edinburgh, Montauban, Castres Olympique | 51 |
| (Australia) Brendan Williams | Petrarca, Benetton Treviso | 51 |
| (France) Nicolas Durand | Béziers, Perpignan, Racing Métro 92, Toulon, Perpignan (2nd stint) | 50 |
| (Scotland) Ross Ford | Borders, Edinburgh | 50 |
| (Ireland) Gary Longwell | Ulster | 50 |
| (Wales) Sonny Parker | Pontypridd, Celtic Warriors, Ospreys | 50 |
| (France) Julien Pierre | Bourgoin, Clermont Auvergne | 50 |
| (Wales) Matthew Rees | Celtic Warriors, Scarlets, Cardiff Blues | 50 |

=== Players with 500 or more Heineken Cup points ===
| Player | Club(s) | Points |
|---|---|---|
| (Ireland) Ronan O'Gara | Munster | 1,365 |
| (Wales) Stephen Jones | Llanelli, Scarlets, Clermont Auvergne, Scarlets (2nd stint) | 869 |
| (France) Dimitri Yachvili | Biarritz | 661 |
| (Italy) (Argentina) Diego Domínguez | Milan, Stade Français | 645 |
| (Ireland) David Humphreys | Ulster | 564 |
| (Wales) Neil Jenkins | Pontypridd, Cardiff, Celtic Warriors | 502 |
| (France) David Skrela | Colomiers, Stade Français, Toulouse, Clermont Auvergne | 500 |

=== Players with 25 or more Heineken Cup tries ===
| Player | Club(s) | Tries |
|---|---|---|
| (France) Vincent Clerc | Toulouse | 35 |
| (Ireland) Brian O'Driscoll | Leinster | 33 |
| (Wales) Dafydd James | Pontypridd, Llanelli, Bridgend, Celtic Warriors, Harlequins, Scarlets, Cardiff Blues | 29 |
| (Ireland) Shane Horgan | Leinster | 27 |
| (Ireland) Gordon D'Arcy | Leinster | 26 |
| (Ireland) Geordan Murphy | Leicester Tigers | 25 |
