= 1997 European Challenge Cup final =

1997 European Challenge Cup Final
- Event: 1996–97 European Challenge Cup
Bourgoin	Castres Olympique
(France)	(France)
18	9
- Date: 26 January 1997
- Venue: Stade de la Méditerranée, Béziers
- Referee: Patrick Robin (France)
- Attendance: 10,000

The 1997 European Challenge Cup Final was the final match of the 1996–97 European Challenge Cup, the inaugural season of Europe's second-tier club rugby union competition. The match was played on 26 January 1997 at Stade de la Méditerranée in Béziers.

The match was contested by Bourgoin and Castres Olympique, who are both from France. Bourgoin won the match 18–9; with match conceding no tries by either team. The only points came from the goal kickers, Alexandre Péclier and Patrice Favre for Bourgoin and Cyril Savy and Sebastien Paillat for Castres.

== Match details ==
26 January 1997

Bourgoin (France)	18 – 9	(France) Castres Olympique
Pen: Péclier (2); Favre (3); Drop: Péclier (1)	Report	Pen: Savy (2); Paillat (1)

Stade de la Méditerranée
Attendance: 10,000
Referee: Patrick Robin (France)

== See also ==
- 1996–97 European Challenge Cup
