= 1996–97 European Challenge Cup =

Tournament details
- Countries: England; France; Ireland; Italy; Romania; Scotland; Wales
- Tournament format(s): Round-robin and knockout
- Date: 12 October 1996 – 26 January 1997

Tournament statistics
- Teams: 24
- Matches played: 66
- Attendance: 443 (7 per match)
- Top point scorer(s): Alexandre Péclier (Bourgoin) (113 points)
- Top try scorer(s): Laurent Leflamand (Bourgoin) (7 tries)

Final
- Venue: Stade de la Méditerranée, Béziers
- Attendance: 10,000
- Champions: (France) Bourgoin (1st title)
- Runners-up: (France) Castres Olympique

The 1996–97 European Challenge Cup (also called the 1996–97 European Shield) was the inaugural year of the European Challenge Cup, the second tier rugby union cup competition below the Heineken Cup. The tournament was held between October 1996 and January 1997 and was won by Bourgoin with an 18–9 victory over Castres in the final at the Stade de la Méditerranée in Béziers, France. Twenty-four teams took part from England, France, Ireland, Italy, Romania, Scotland and Wales, divided into four groups of six. Each team played the other teams in the group once, meaning each had five matches with either two or three on their home ground. The quarter–finals saw seven of the eight clubs coming from France, with the only non-French club being Northampton Saints.

== Teams ==
The qualifying teams were drawn from seven countries. Generally, these were teams from the top division of domestic rugby that did not qualify to play in the Heineken Cup:

- England: 6 teams from the English Premiership
- France: 7 teams from the French Championship
- Ireland: one team representing one of the four Provinces of Ireland
- Italy: one team from the National Championship of Excellence
- Romania: one team from the National League
- Scotland: one team representing one of the four geographical districts
- Wales: 7 teams from the Welsh Premier Division

England	France	Ireland	Italy	Romania	Scotland	Wales
Bristol; Gloucester; London Irish; Northampton Saints; Orrell; Sale Sharks	Agen; Bordeaux-Bègles; Bourgoin; Castres Olympique; Montferrand; Narbonne; Toulon	Connacht	Petrarca	Dinamo-București	Glasgow	Bridgend; Dunvant; Ebbw Vale; Newbridge; Newport; Swansea; Treorchy

== Pool stage ==
Twenty four teams participated in the pool stage of the competition; they were divided into four pools of six teams each, with each team playing the other teams in their pool once only. Matches took place between 12 October and 2 November 1996 and teams were awarded two points for a win and one point for a draw. The winner and runner-up of each pool progressed to the knockout stage of the tournament.

=== Pool 1 ===
Team	P	W	D	L	Tries for	Tries against	Try diff	Points for	Points against	Points diff	Pts
(France) Agen	5	5	0	0	20	9	+11	156	82	+74	10
(France) Montferrand	5	4	0	1	30	8	+22	211	74	+137	8
(England) Sale Sharks	5	3	0	2	18	14	+4	166	115	+51	6
(Wales) Newport	5	2	0	3	14	19	−15	98	158	−60	4
(Scotland) Glasgow	5	1	0	4	15	30	−15	113	202	−89	2
(Wales) Newbridge	5	0	0	5	16	33	−17	106	219	−113	0
Source : www.ercrugby.com

=== Pool 2 ===
Team	P	W	D	L	Tries for	Tries against	Try diff	Points for	Points against	Points diff	Pts
(France) Castres Olympique	5	5	0	0	29	6	+23	207	71	+136	10
(France) Narbonne	5	4	0	1	21	6	+15	161	90	+71	8
(Romania) Dinamo-București	5	2	1	2	12	32	−20	109	213	−104	5
(Wales) Bridgend	4	1	1	2	10	14	−4	94	120	−26	3
(England) Bristol	5	1	0	4	11	12	−1	128	99	+29	2
(Wales) Treorchy	4	0	0	4	10	23	−13	72	178	−106	0
Source : www.ercrugby.com

The Treorchy v Bridgend match was not played.

=== Pool 3 ===
Team	P	W	D	L	Tries for	Tries against	Try diff	Points for	Points against	Points diff	Pts
(England) Northampton Saints	5	5	0	0	28	12	+16	207	88	+119	10
(France) Toulon	5	4	0	1	22	10	+12	164	102	+62	8
(England) Orrell	5	2	0	3	18	22	−4	122	173	−51	4
(Ireland) Connacht	5	2	0	3	9	17	−8	94	131	−37	4
(Wales) Dunvant	5	1	0	4	15	22	−7	106	169	−63	2
(Italy) Petrarca	5	1	0	4	10	19	−9	118	148	−30	2
Source : www.ercrugby.com

=== Pool 4 ===
Team	P	W	D	L	Tries for	Tries against	Try diff	Points for	Points against	Points diff	Pts
(France) Bourgoin	5	5	0	0	27	4	+23	196	66	+130	10
(France) Bordeaux-Bègles	5	3	1	1	29	13	+16	195	99	+96	7
(Wales) Swansea	5	3	1	1	28	19	+9	207	138	+69	7
(England) Gloucester	5	2	0	3	17	17	0	119	123	−4	4
(Wales) Ebbw Vale	5	1	0	4	6	36	−30	48	243	−195	2
(England) London Irish	5	0	0	5	12	30	−18	90	186	−96	0
Source : www.ercrugby.com

== Qualifiers ==
Seed	Pool Winners	Pts	TF	+/−
1	(France) Castres Olympique	10	29	+136
2	(England) Northampton Saints	10	28	+119
3	(France) Bourgoin	10	27	+130
4	(France) Agen	10	20	+74
Seed	Runners-up	Pts	TF	+/−
5	(France) Montferrand	8	30	+137
6	(France) Toulon	8	22	+62
7	(France) Narbonne	8	21	+71
8	(France) Bordeaux-Bègles	7	29	+96

== Knockout stage ==
=== Quarter-finals ===
16 November 1996

Bourgoin (France)	17–15	(France) Montferrand
	Report

Stade Pierre Rajon
Attendance: 7,000
Referee: Patrick Robin (France)

16 November 1996

Castres Olympique (France)	23–15	(France) Toulon
	Report

Stade Pierre-Antoine
Attendance: 5,000
Referee: Daniel Gillet (France)

16 November 1996

Northampton Saints (England)	22–23	(France) Narbonne
	Report

Franklin's Gardens
Attendance: 7,000
Referee: Andrew Watson (England)

16 November 1996

Agen (France)	20–15 (a.e.t.)	(France) Bordeaux-Bègles
	Report

Stade Armandie
Attendance: 8,000
Referee: Didier Méné (France)

=== Semi-finals ===
5 January 1997

Bourgoin (France)	29–6	(France) Narbonne
	Report

Stade Pierre Rajon
Attendance: 7,000
Referee: Bernard Perez (France)

5 January 1997

Castres Olympique (France)	23–6	(France) Agen
	Report

Stade Pierre-Antoine
Attendance: 5,000
Referee: Joel Dumé (France)

=== Final ===
26 January 1997

Bourgoin (France)	18–9	(France) Castres Olympique
	Report

Stade de la Méditerranée
Attendance: 10,000
Referee: Patrick Robin (France)

== See also ==
- European Challenge Cup
- 1996–97 Heineken Cup
