= Georges Meurdra =

French abstract expressionist sculptor (born 1960)

- Born: February 12, 1960 (age 66); Strasbourg, France
- Education: École régionale des beaux-arts de Valence
- Known for: Sculpture

Georges Meurdra (born February 12, 1960) is a French abstract expressionist sculptor.

== Life ==
Meudra was born and raised in Strasbourg. Since he graduated from the Valence Art School (École régionale des beaux-arts de Valence, (Drôme), in 1983, Georges Meurdra has mainly devoted himself to metal sculpture. Since his encounter with American sculptor Mark di Suvero, in 1988, he has consistently cooperated with La Vie des Formes for the execution of monumental sculptures, notably in France and in New York. His technique, characterized by a strong determination to work without constraints, has led Meurdra to recommend the use of recycled materials. Georges Meurdra currently lives and works in France in Beaumont-lès-Valence.

== Sculptures in public collections and public spaces ==
- Ring 1, 1985, Institut d'art contemporain de Villeurbanne, Villeurbanne, France
- Up Saone River, 1988, City of Romans-sur-Isère, Drôme, France
- Face à l'océan, 1992, City of Romans-sur-Isère, Drôme, France
- Kaydara, 2002, City of Caudry, Nord-Pas-de-Calais, France
- Scanda, 2005, City of Chalon-sur-Saône, Saône-et-Loire, France
- Astrolabe, 2011, City of Beaumont-lès-Valence, Drôme, France

== Sources ==
- Crest : Bois, métal et lumière dans la Tour, Le Dauphiné, 31 juillet 2011.
- Fer Lumière Georges Meurdra – Sculptures / Emmanuel Georges – Photographies, La Fabrique de l'Image, 2011.
- Georges Meurdra, Artiste sculpteur du métal, site officiel de Beaumont-lès-Valence.
- Georges Meurdra – Serge Landois – Daniele Orcier: le Musée de Valence, 22 Déc. 86-31 Janv. 87, Musée des Beaux-Arts et d'Histoire Naturelle. Valence, Rhône, 1987.
