= European Professional Club Rugby =

Governing body and organiser of rugby union club tournaments

European Professional Club Rugby (EPCR)
- Sport: Rugby union
- Founded: 2014
- Headquarters: Lausanne, Switzerland
- Chairman: Dominic McKay (From May 2022)
- CEO: Jacques Raynaud (From June 2023)
- Replaced: European Rugby Cup (ERC)

Official website
- www.epcrugby.com

European Professional Club Rugby (EPCR) is the governing body and organiser of the two major club rugby union tournaments: the European Rugby Champions Cup - named the Investec Champions Cup due to sponsorship reasons - and the EPCR Challenge Cup. A third tournament, the European Rugby Challenge Cup Qualifying Competition was introduced as a qualification competition for clubs from minor nations to enter the Challenge Cup. EPCR shared control of this tournament with Rugby Europe, the international federation for rugby union in Europe, and with the Italian Rugby Federation (FIR). The tournament was discontinued after the 2018/19 season.

The organisation was established in 2014 in Neuchâtel, Switzerland and is now headquartered in Lausanne. Switzerland was chosen so as not to have the headquarters in any of the seven participating countries.

EPCR has nine stakeholders – the six tier 1 unions whose national teams play in the Six Nations Championship, and the club bodies that represent the English, French, Scottish, Irish, Italian, Welsh and South African clubs in their respective leagues - currently the Gallagher PREM (English clubs), the TOP14 (French clubs) and the United Rugby Championship (Scottish, Irish, Italian, Welsh and South African clubs).

The inaugural competitions were held in the 2014/15 season.

== History ==
Prior to 2014, the pan-European club competitions - the Heineken Cup, and European Challenge Cup - were organised and run by European Rugby Cup Ltd. (ERC). ERC was created in 1995, following the advent of professionalism, by the then Five Nations Committee.

In 2012, Premiership Rugby and LNR, on behalf of the English and French clubs respectively, notified ERC that they would be withdrawing from the accord governing the competition, being dissatisfied with the organisation of the competition and the distribution of funding. Premiership Rugby subsequently refused to join any new agreement in which ERC remained organisers of European rugby tournaments.

On April 10, 2014 it was announced that the nine stakeholders with an interest in continuing major European club competition had come to an agreement for new competitions. Under the new agreement, ERC was wound up, and a new body, European Professional Club Rugby (EPCR), would be created to organise three new competitions, European Rugby Champions Cup, the European Rugby Challenge Cup, and the third tier Qualifying Competition, beginning with the 2014/15 season.

Shortly after the establishment of EPCR, it was announced that the running of the inaugural 2014/15 tournament was to be handled in conjunction with ERC, the organisation it had been meant to replace, to facilitate a smooth transition. This was despite the latter having been described as "no longer fit for purpose" by chairman of Premiership Rugby, Quentin Smith.

Since the 2015/16 season, EPCR staff have been running the competitions from their base in Switzerland. In 2017 the qualifying competition was reconstituted as a fully fledged third competition, the European Rugby Continental Shield.

In October 2026, ahead of their bid to host the 2035 Rugby World Cup, the President of the Spanish Rugby Federation, Juan Carlos Martin Sanchez, revealed he had been in discussions with EPCR to admit a Spanish team into the European Challenge Cup as soon as 2027.

== EPCR governance ==
=== Board of directors ===
EPCR is managed through a 9-person Board of Directors, which represents all stakeholders, and includes an independent chairman. The nine shareholders, by country, are listed below:

- England - Rugby Football Union, Premiership Rugby Limited
- France - Ligue Nationale de Rugby
- Italy - Federazione Italiana Rugby
- Ireland, Italy, Scotland, South Africa, Wales - United Rugby Championship

The EPCR independent chairman is Dominic McKay, who took over as interim chairman when Simon Halliday stepped down in October 2021. McKay was confirmed as permanent chairman in May 2022.

=== Executive committee ===
There is also an executive committee, in charge of commercial matters relating to the tournaments, and preparations for Board meetings. This committee includes the Independent Chairman, Director-General, and three voting representatives, one representing each of the major European domestic leagues, the Top 14, the English Premiership and Pro14. Representation by English and French clubs on the three-person executive committee represents an increase in voting power for these two leagues as compared to the previous European Rugby Cup.

Jacques Pineau became the interim Director General of EPCR when the tournament began, and was responsible for the day-to-day operations of EPCR. On 29 April 2015, it was announced that Swiss national Vincent Gaillard had been appointed the Director General, and would work with Pineau until 1 July 2015, when he would officially take on the role. Anthony Lepage was appointed to the role of CEO on an interim basis in October 2021 when Gaillard stepped down, with Jacques Raynaud taking up the permanent role in 2023.

== Revenue ==
Revenues generated by EPCR tournaments are divided in three equal parts — one third to Premiership Rugby clubs, one third to LNR clubs, and one third to URC clubs. Under the previous European Rugby Cup, the Irish, Welsh, Scottish and Italian clubs had received 52% of revenues, while the English and French clubs received 48%.

Revenue is generated through commercial partnerships, broadcast deals and ticket sales from the Investec Champions Cup semi-finals and the Investec Champions Cup and EPCR Challenge Cup Finals weekend.

Currently, EPCR has nine commercial partners:

- Investec - Investec Champions Cup Title Partner and EPCR Challenge Cup Official Partner
- Emirates - EPCR Premium Partner
- Heineken - Investec Champions Cup Premium Partner
- DHL - EPCR Official Partner
- Georgia Tourism - EPCR Official Partner
- JAECOO - EPCR Official Partner
- Groupe APICIL - EPCR Official Partner
- Gilbert - EPCR Official Supporter
- Macron - EPCR Official Supporter

EPCR broadcasts matches on its OTT platform EPCR.TV and also has six host broadcast partners:

- Premier Sports and S4C in the UK and Ireland
- France Télévisions and beIN SPORTS in France
- SuperSport in sub-Saharan Africa
- FloRugby in the US and Canada

Further broadcast deals ensure EPCR competitions are broadcast in over 100 territories.

In 2024 EPCR turned down a UK TV rights deal of £14m from TNT Sports, later agreeing a £6m deal with Premier Sports (which has a much smaller audience than TNT).

== European Player of the Year ==
The European Player Award was introduced by ERC in 2010, as part of their ERC15 awards, created to recognise the outstanding contributors of the first 15 years of European rugby. The first recipient of the award, considered the best player of the previous 15 years, was Munster Rugby's Ronan O'Gara. Following the award, and beginning with the 2010-11 Heineken Cup season, ERC began presenting a Player of the Year Award annually.

EPCR continued the award after taking over the running of European competitions, and the first EPCR European Player of the Year Award was presented following the 2014-15 European Rugby Champions Cup season.

The award is now known as the Investec Player of the Year. The shortlist is decided by a panel of five rugby experts and broadcasters, and then voted for by the public and announced at the Investec Champions Cup Final.

Since 2017, the Player of the Year has been awarded The Anthony Foley Memorial Trophy, commissioned in tribute to Anthony Foley, the former Munster head-coach.

=== ERC European Player of the Year (2010 — 2014) ===
- 2010: Ronan O'Gara (Munster Rugby) (Awarded for the previous 15 seasons)
- 2011: Seán O'Brien (Leinster Rugby)
- 2012: Rob Kearney (Leinster Rugby)
- 2013: Jonny Wilkinson (Toulon)
- 2014: Steffon Armitage (Toulon)

=== EPCR European Player of the Year (2015 — present) ===
- 2015: Nick Abendanon (Clermont)
- 2016: Maro Itoje (Saracens)
- 2017: Owen Farrell (Saracens)
- 2018: Leone Nakarawa (Racing 92)
- 2019: Alex Goode (Saracens)
- 2020: Sam Simmonds (Exeter Chiefs)
- 2021: Antoine Dupont (Toulouse)
- 2022: Josh van der Flier (Leinster)
- 2023: Grégory Alldritt (La Rochelle)
- 2024: Antoine Dupont (Toulouse)
- 2025: Damian Penaud (Bordeaux Bègles)

== EPCR Elite Awards ==
The Elite Awards were created by ERC, to celebrate the 10th anniversary season of the Heineken Cup. Introduced to recognise the most prominent teams and players of the competitions, EPCR has since maintained and continued the awards, updating them to include both Heineken Cup and European Rugby Champions Cup appearances.

=== Teams with 100 or more European Cup appearances ===
Team	Total Appearances
(Ireland) Leinster	209
(France) Toulouse	208
(Ireland) Munster	206
(England) Leicester Tigers	179
(Ireland) Ulster	177
(Wales) Scarlets (Note: Includes 48 appearances as Llanelli RFC before the introduction of regional teams in Wales *)	156
(Scotland) Glasgow Warriors	145
(England) Northampton Saints	138
(France) Montferrand / Clermont Auvergne	133
(Wales) Cardiff Blues (Note: Includes 44 appearances as Cardiff RFC before the introduction of regional teams in Wales *)	128
(Italy) Benetton	125
(England) Saracens	122
(England) Wasps	119
(Scotland) Edinburgh	118
(England) Bath	118
(England) Harlequins F.C.	111
(France) Castres Olympique	102
(England) Harlequins F.C.	101
(France) Stade Français	100
Updated 28 May 2025

=== Players with 100 or more European Cup caps ===
Player	Club(s)	Total Appearances
(Ireland) Cian Healy	Leinster	114
(Ireland) Ronan O'Gara	Munster	110
(Ireland) Gordon D'Arcy	Leinster	104
(Ireland) John Hayes	Munster	101
(Ireland) Peter Stringer	Munster, Saracens, Bath, Sale Sharks	101
Updated 28 May 2025

=== Players with 500 or more European Cup points ===
Player	Club(s)	Points
(Ireland) Ronan O'Gara	Munster	1,365
(England) Owen Farrell	Saracens	874
(Wales) Stephen Jones	Llanelli, Scarlets, Clermont Auvergne	869
(Ireland) Johnny Sexton	Leinster, Racing 92	784
(France) Dimitri Yachvili	Biarritz	661
(Italy) (Argentina) Diego Domínguez	Milan, Stade Français	645
(Wales) Dan Biggar	Ospreys, Northampton Saints, RC Toulon	634
(France) Morgan Parra	Bourgoin, Clermont	569
(Ireland) David Humphreys	Ulster	564
(Wales) Leigh Halfpenny	Cardiff Blues, Toulon, Scarlets	523
(Wales) Neil Jenkins	Pontypridd, Cardiff, Celtic Warriors	502
(France) David Skrela	Colomiers, Stade Français, Toulouse, Clermont Auvergne	500
Updated 28 May 2025

=== Players with 25 or more European Cup tries ===
Player	Club(s)	Tries
(England) Chris Ashton	Northampton Saints, Saracens, Toulon, Sale Sharks, Leicester Tigers	41
(France) Vincent Clerc	Toulouse	36
(Ireland) Simon Zebo	Munster Rugby, Racing 92	35
(Argentina) Juan Imhoff	Racing 92	33
(Ireland) Brian O'Driscoll	Leinster	33
(Ireland) James Lowe	Leinster	31
(Wales) Dafydd James	Pontypridd, Llanelli, Bridgend, Celtic Warriors, Harlequins, Scarlets, Cardiff Blues	29
(Ireland) Tommy Bowe	Ulster, Ospreys	29
(Ireland) Shane Horgan	Leinster	27
(Ireland) Andrew Trimble	Ulster	27
(France) Antoine Dupont	Castres, Toulouse	27
(France) Damian Penaud	Clermont, Bordeaux	27
(Ireland) Gordon D'Arcy	Leinster	26
(Ireland) Geordan Murphy	Leicester Tigers	25
(Fiji) Naipolioni Nalaga	Clermont Auvergne	25
Updated 28 May 2025

== See also ==
- European Rugby Champions Cup
- European Rugby Challenge Cup
- European Rugby Continental Shield
