= Beauvallon =

Beauvallon may refer to the following places:

- Beauvallon, Drôme, a commune in the Drôme department, France
- Beauvallon, Rhône, a commune in the Rhône department, France
- Beauvallon, Alberta, a hamlet in Alberta, Canada
