= Laurent Leflamand =

French rugby union player (born 1968)

- Born: 4 April 1968 (age 58) Cherbourg, France
- Height: 6 ft 3 in (191 cm)
- Weight: 187 lb (85 kg)

Rugby union career
- Position: Wing
International career
| Years | Team | Apps | (Points) |
| 1996–97 | France | 8 | (25) |

Laurent Leflamand (born 4 April 1968) is a French former rugby union international who represented France in eight Test matches from 1996 to 1997.

Leflamand, born in Cherbourg, played for Lyon OU, FC Grenoble, CS Bourgoin-Jallieu and US Bressane.

A winger, Leflamand featured in France's grand slam winning 1997 Five Nations campaign, during which he scored four tries, including a double against Wales. He was the tournament's equal top try-scorer with David Venditti.

== See also ==
- List of France national rugby union players
