= Montéléger =

- Commune
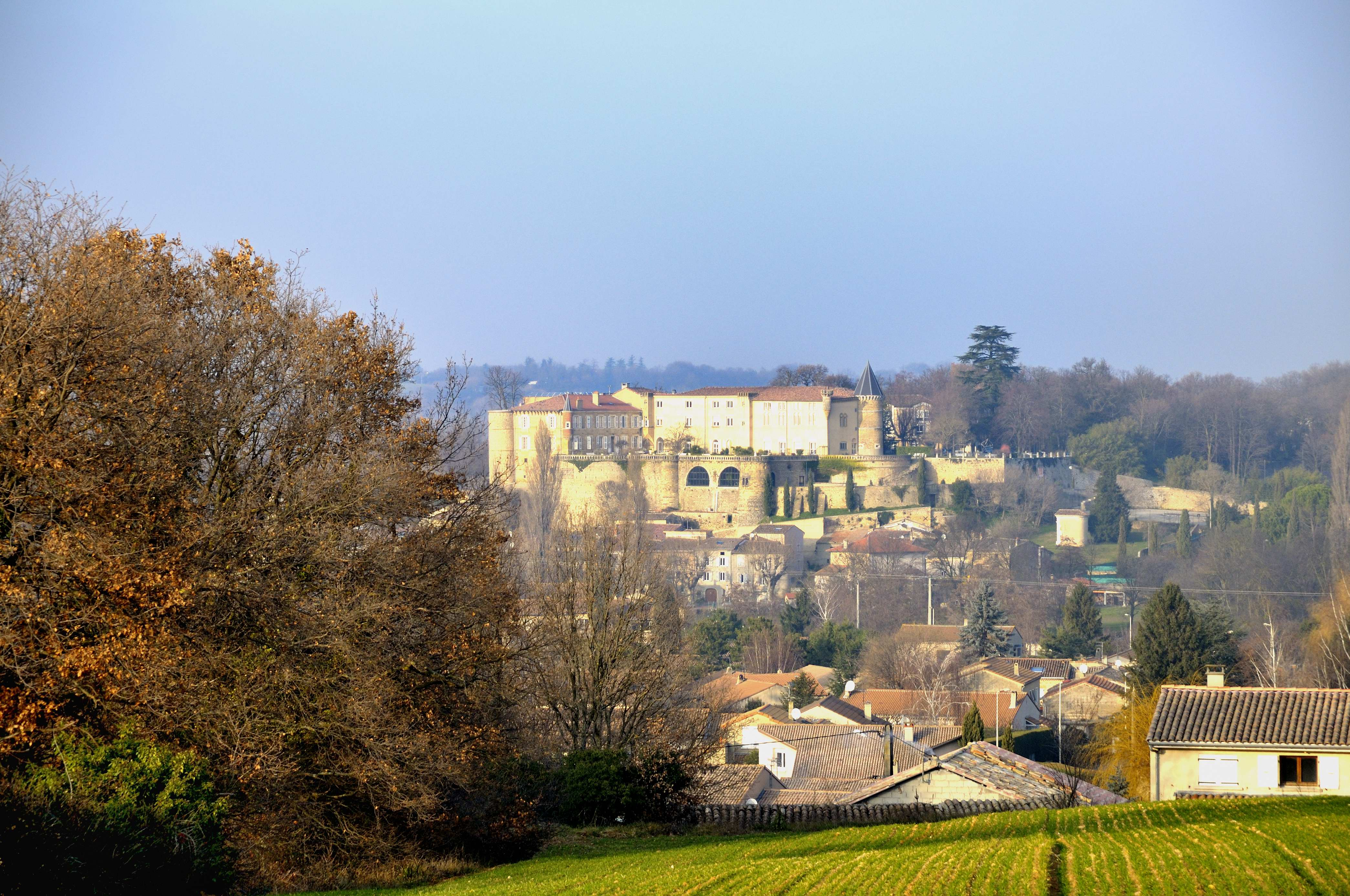
- Chateau

- Coat of arms
- Location of Montéléger
- Location within France Location within Auvergne-Rhône-Alpes
- Coordinates: 44°51′15″N 4°56′02″E
- Country: France
- Region: Auvergne-Rhône-Alpes
- Department: Drôme
- Arrondissement: Valence
- Canton: Valence-3
- Intercommunality: CA Valence Romans Agglo

Government
  - Mayor (2020–2026): Marylène Peyrard
- Area^{1}: 9.45 km^{2} (3.65 sq mi)
- Elevation: 109 m (358 ft)
- Highest elevation: 222 m (728 ft)
- Lowest elevation: 129 m (423 ft)
- Population (2023): 1,673
  - Density: 177/km^{2} (459/sq mi)
- Time zone: UTC+01:00 (CET)
  - Summer (DST): UTC+02:00 (CEST)
- INSEE/Postal code: 26196 /26760
- ^{1} French Land Register data, which excludes lakes, ponds, glaciers > 1 km^{2} (0.386 sq mi or 247 acres) and river estuaries.

Montéléger (French pronunciation: [mɔ̃teleʒe]; Occitan: Montalagier) is a commune in the Drôme department in southeastern France.

== Population ==
Historical population
Year	Pop.	±% p.a.
1968	580	—
1975	941	+7.16%
1982	1,432	+6.18%
1990	1,399	−0.29%
1999	1,526	+0.97%
2007	1,885	+2.68%
2012	1,802	−0.90%
2017	1,806	+0.04%
2023	1,673	−1.27%
Source: INSEE

== See also ==
- Communes of the Drôme department
