= 1997 Five Nations Championship =

Rugby union competition

- Date: 18 January – 15 March 1997
- Countries: England; France; Ireland; Scotland; Wales

Tournament statistics
- Champions: France (11th title)
- Grand Slam: France (5th title)
- Triple Crown: England (20th title)
- Matches played: 10
- Tries scored: 50 (5 per match)
- Top point scorer: (England) Paul Grayson (52 points)
- Top try scorers: (France) David Venditti (France) Laurent Leflamand (4 tries)

The 1997 Five Nations Championship was the sixty-eighth series of the rugby union Five Nations Championship. Including the previous incarnations as the Home Nations and Five Nations, this was the hundred-and-third series of the northern hemisphere rugby union championship. Ten matches were played over five weekends from 18 January to 15 March, the crucial match being in Weekend 4 where England inexplicably threw away a 20–6 lead at Twickenham with quarter of the match to go and were pipped by France. France went on to win their first Grand Slam in ten years; England defeated the other Home Nations by large margins to win the Triple Crown. It was the last time that France played at the Parc des Princes, in Paris. Since then, the French team has been playing in the Stade de France, also in Paris.

== Participants ==
The teams involved were:

Nation	Venue	City	Head coach	Captain
England	Twickenham Stadium	London	Jack Rowell	Phil de Glanville
France	Parc des Princes	Paris	Jean-Claude Skrela	Abdelatif Benazzi
Ireland	Lansdowne Road	Dublin	Brian Ashton	Keith Wood/Jim Staples
Scotland	Murrayfield Stadium	Edinburgh	Jim Telfer	Rob Wainwright
Wales	National Stadium	Cardiff	Kevin Bowring	Jonathan Humphreys

== Table ==
Pos	Team	Pld	W	D	L	PF	PA	PD	Pts
1	France	4	4	0	0	129	77	+52	8
2	England	4	3	0	1	141	55	+86	6
3	Wales	4	1	0	3	94	106	−12	2
4	Scotland	4	1	0	3	90	132	−42	2
5	Ireland	4	1	0	3	57	141	−84	2

== Results ==
=== Week 1 ===
18 January 1997
15:00

Ireland	15–32	France
Pen: Elwood (5)	Report	Try: Galthié; Venditti (3); Con: Castaignède (3); Pen: Castaignède (2)

Lansdowne Road, Dublin
Attendance: 53,000
Referee: Andre Watson (South Africa)

18 January 1997
15:00

Scotland	19–34	Wales
Try: S. Hastings; Con: Shepherd; Pen: Shepherd (3); Drop: Chalmers	Report	Try: Evans; N. Jenkins; S. Quinnell; A. Thomas; Con: N. Jenkins (4); Pen: N. Jenkins (2)

Murrayfield, Edinburgh
Attendance: 67,500
Referee: Bertie Smith (Ireland)

=== Week 2 ===
1 February 1997
15:00

England	41–13	Scotland
Try: Penalty try Carling; De Glanville; Gomarsall; Con: Grayson (3); Pen: Grayson (5)	Report	Try: Eriksson; Con: Shepherd; Pen: Shepherd (2)

Twickenham, London
Attendance: 75,000
Referee: Paddy O'Brien (New Zealand)

1 February 1997
15:00

Wales	25–26	Ireland
Try: Evans (2); S. Quinnell; Con: N. Jenkins (2); Pen: N. Jenkins (2)	Report	Try: Bell; Hickie; Miller; Con: Elwood (1); Pen: Elwood (3)

National Stadium, Cardiff
Attendance: 53,000
Referee: Wayne Erickson (Australia)

=== Week 3 ===
15 February 1997
15:00

France	27–22	Wales
Try: Leflamand (2); Merle; Venditti; Con: Aucagne (1); Dourthe (1); Pen: Aucagne	Report	Try: Bateman; Howley; G. Thomas; Con: N. Jenkins (2); Pen: N. Jenkins

Parc des Princes, Paris
Attendance: 46,000
Referee: Peter Marshall (Australia)

15 February 1997
15:00

Ireland	6–46	England
Pen: Elwood (2)	Report	Try: Gomarsall; Hill; Sleightholme (2); T. Underwood (2); Con: Grayson (2); Pen: Grayson (4)

Lansdowne Road, Dublin
Attendance: 51,898
Referee: Colin Hawke (New Zealand)

=== Week 4 ===
1 March 1997
15:00

England	20–23	France
Try: Dallaglio; Pen: Grayson (4); Drop: Grayson	Report	Try: Lamaison; Leflamand; Con: Lamaison (2); Pen: Lamaison (2); Drop: Lamaison

Twickenham, London
Attendance: 75,000
Referee: Jim Fleming (Scotland)

1 March 1997
15:00

Scotland	38–10	Ireland
Try: Stanger; Tait; Townsend; Walton; Weir; Con: Shepherd (5); Pen: Shepherd	Report	Try: Hickie; Con: Humphreys; Pen: Humphreys

Murrayfield, Edinburgh
Attendance: 67,500
Referee: Gareth Simmonds (Wales)

=== Week 5 ===
15 March 1997
15:00

France	47–20	Scotland
Try: Benazzi; Leflamand; Magne; Tournaire; Con: Lamaison (3); Pen: Lamaison (6); Drop: Sadourny	Report	Try: Tait (2); Con: Shepherd (2); Pen: Shepherd (2)

Parc des Princes, Paris
Attendance: 49,000
Referee: Ed Morrison (England)

15 March 1997
15:00

Wales	13–34	England
Try: Howley; Con: J. Davies; Pen: J. Davies (2)	Report	Try: De Glanville; Hill; Stimpson; T. Underwood; Con: Catt (4); Pen: Catt (2)

National Stadium, Cardiff
Attendance: 53,000
Referee: Joel Dume (France)
