= Portes-lès-Valence =

- Commune
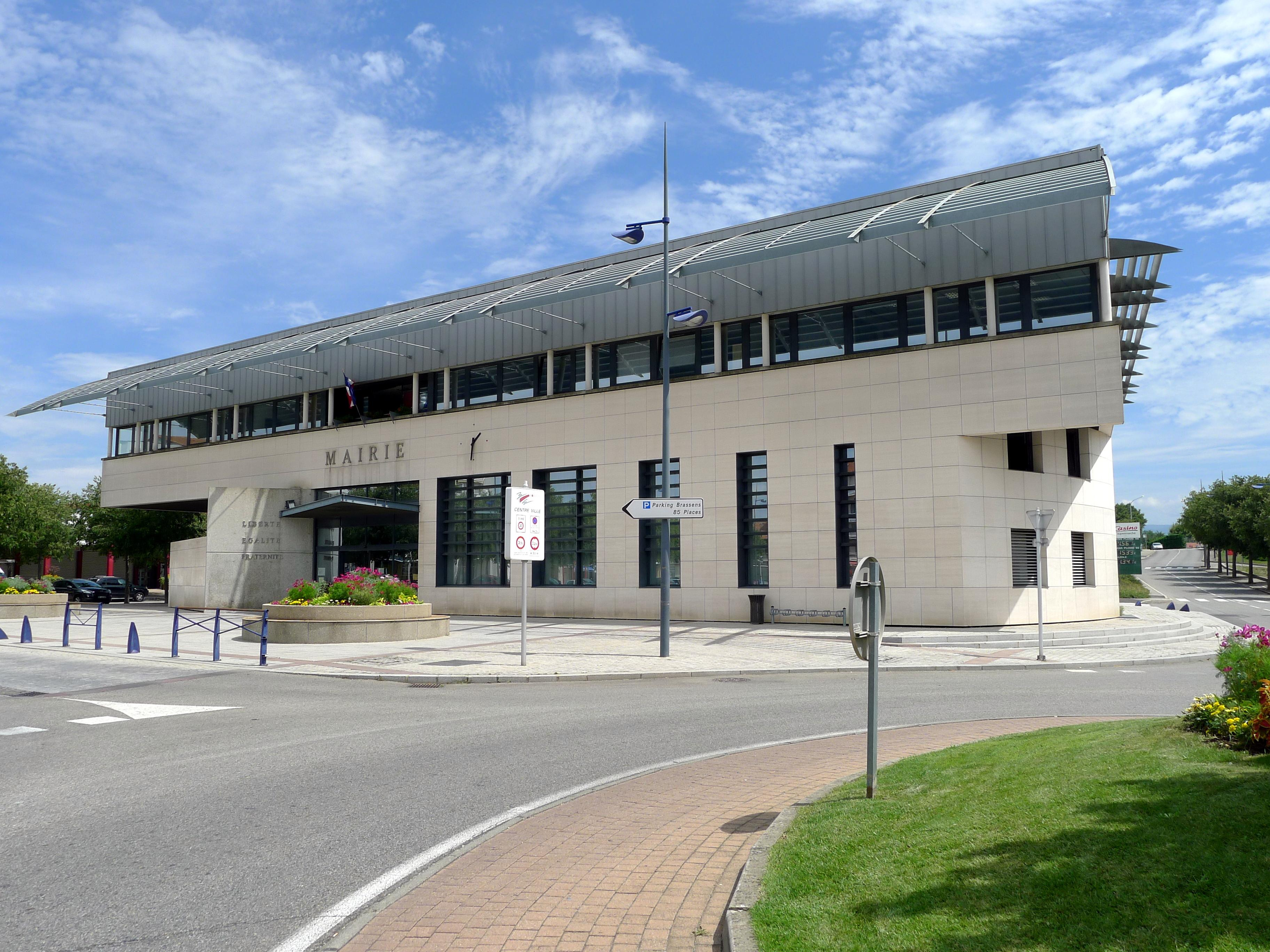
- Town hall

- Coat of arms
- Location of Portes-lès-Valence
- Location within France Location within Auvergne-Rhône-Alpes
- Coordinates: 44°52′27″N 4°52′37″E
- Country: France
- Region: Auvergne-Rhône-Alpes
- Department: Drôme
- Arrondissement: Valence
- Canton: Valence-3
- Intercommunality: CA Valence Romans Agglo

Government
  - Mayor (2020–2026): Geneviève Girard
- Area^{1}: 14.42 km^{2} (5.57 sq mi)
- Elevation: 142 m (466 ft)
- Highest elevation: 183 m (600 ft)
- Lowest elevation: 106 m (348 ft)
- Population (2023): 10,477
  - Density: 726.6/km^{2} (1,882/sq mi)
- Time zone: UTC+01:00 (CET)
  - Summer (DST): UTC+02:00 (CEST)
- INSEE/Postal code: 26252 /26800
- ^{1} French Land Register data, which excludes lakes, ponds, glaciers > 1 km^{2} (0.386 sq mi or 247 acres) and river estuaries.

Portes-lès-Valence (French pronunciation: [pɔʁt lɛ valɑ̃s], literally Portes near Valence; Occitan: Pòrtas) is a commune in the Drôme department in southeastern France. It is a suburb of Valence.

== Geography ==
Portes-lès-Valence is situated in the south side of Valence and it is part of its urban area.

== Population ==
Historical population

Year	Pop.	±% p.a.
1793	227	—
1800	201	−1.72%
1806	247	+3.49%
1821	343	+2.21%
1831	435	+2.40%
1836	430	−0.23%
1841	431	+0.05%
1846	468	+1.66%
1851	475	+0.30%
1856	497	+0.91%
1861	485	−0.49%
1866	448	−1.57%
1872	455	+0.26%
1876	515	+3.15%
1881	516	+0.04%
1886	518	+0.08%
1891	504	−0.55%
1896	526	+0.86%
1901	563	+1.37%

Year	Pop.	±% p.a.
1906	556	−0.25%
1911	1,400	+20.28%
1921	1,582	+1.23%
1926	2,088	+5.71%
1931	2,555	+4.12%
1936	2,700	+1.11%
1946	2,737	+0.14%
1954	3,340	+2.52%
1962	4,580	+4.03%
1968	6,123	+4.96%
1975	6,834	+1.58%
1982	7,337	+1.02%
1990	7,818	+0.80%
1999	8,090	+0.38%
2007	9,304	+1.76%
2012	9,629	+0.69%
2017	10,610	+1.96%
2023	10,477	−0.21%

Source: EHESS and INSEE (1968-2023)

== International relations ==
Portes-lès-Valance is twinned with:

- Baronissi - Italy (2006)

== See also ==
- Communes of the Drôme department
