= Steffon Armitage =

England international rugby union player

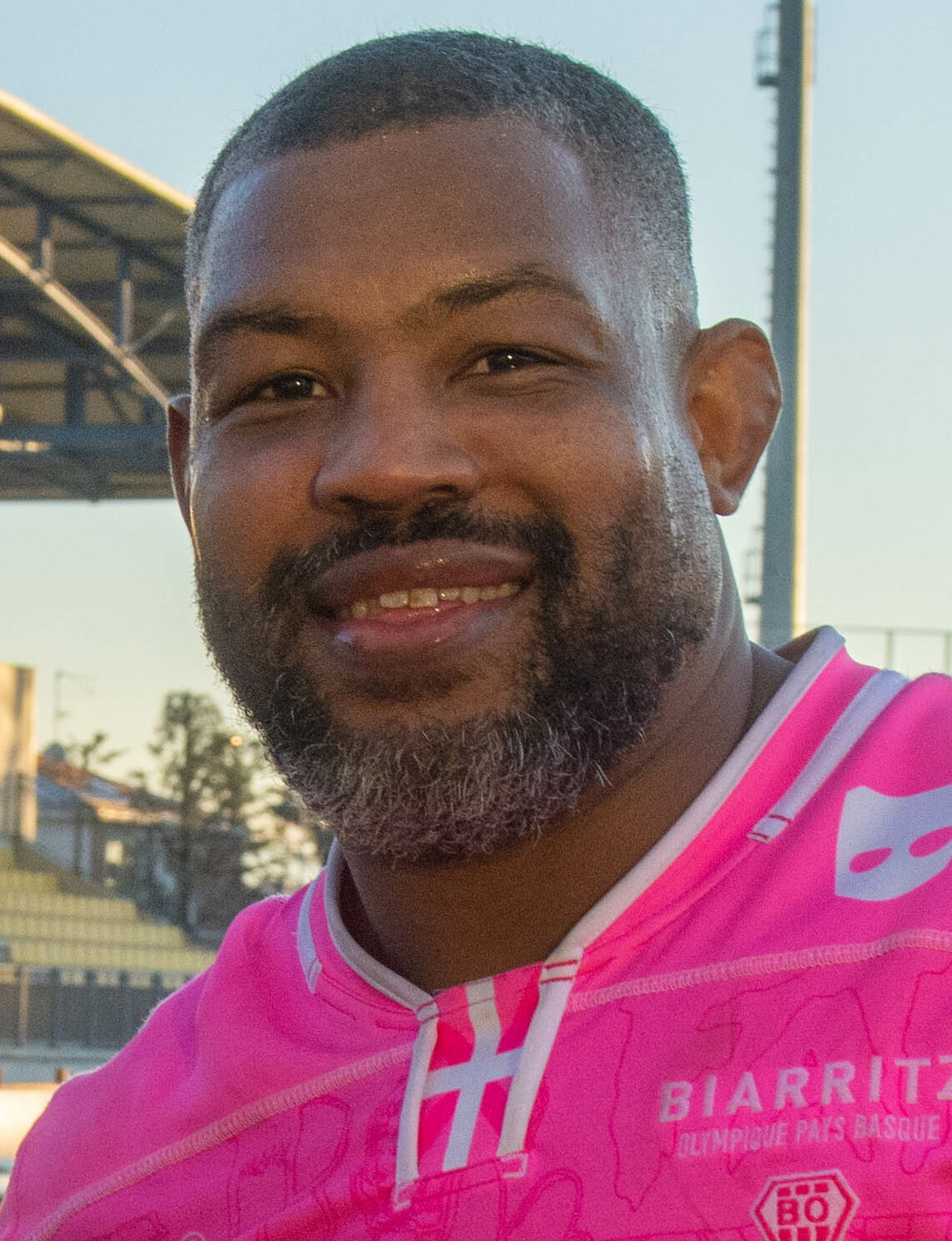
- Armitage in 2021
- Born: Steffon Elvis Armitage; 20 September 1985 (age 41) San Fernando, Trinidad and Tobago
- Height: 1.75 m (5 ft 9 in)
- Weight: 106 kg (16 st 10 lb)
- School: Ivybridge Community College
- Notable relative(s): Delon Armitage (brother); Guy Armitage (brother)

Rugby union career
- Position(s): Flanker, Number Eight
Youth career
- Richmond
- Racing Rugby Club de Nice
Senior career
Years	Team	Apps	(Points)
2004–2006	Saracens	5	(15)
2006–2011	London Irish	136	(128)
2011–2016	Toulon	161	(170)
2016–2019	Pau	62	(25)
2019–2022	Biarritz	73	(35)
2022–	Nice	20	(15)
- Correct as of 24 April 2023
International career
Years	Team	Apps	(Points)
2008	England A		
2009–2010	England	5	(0)
National sevens team
Years	Team		Comps
- England

Steffon Armitage (born 20 September 1985) is an English professional rugby union player who currently plays for French club Stade Niçois.

== Early life and career ==
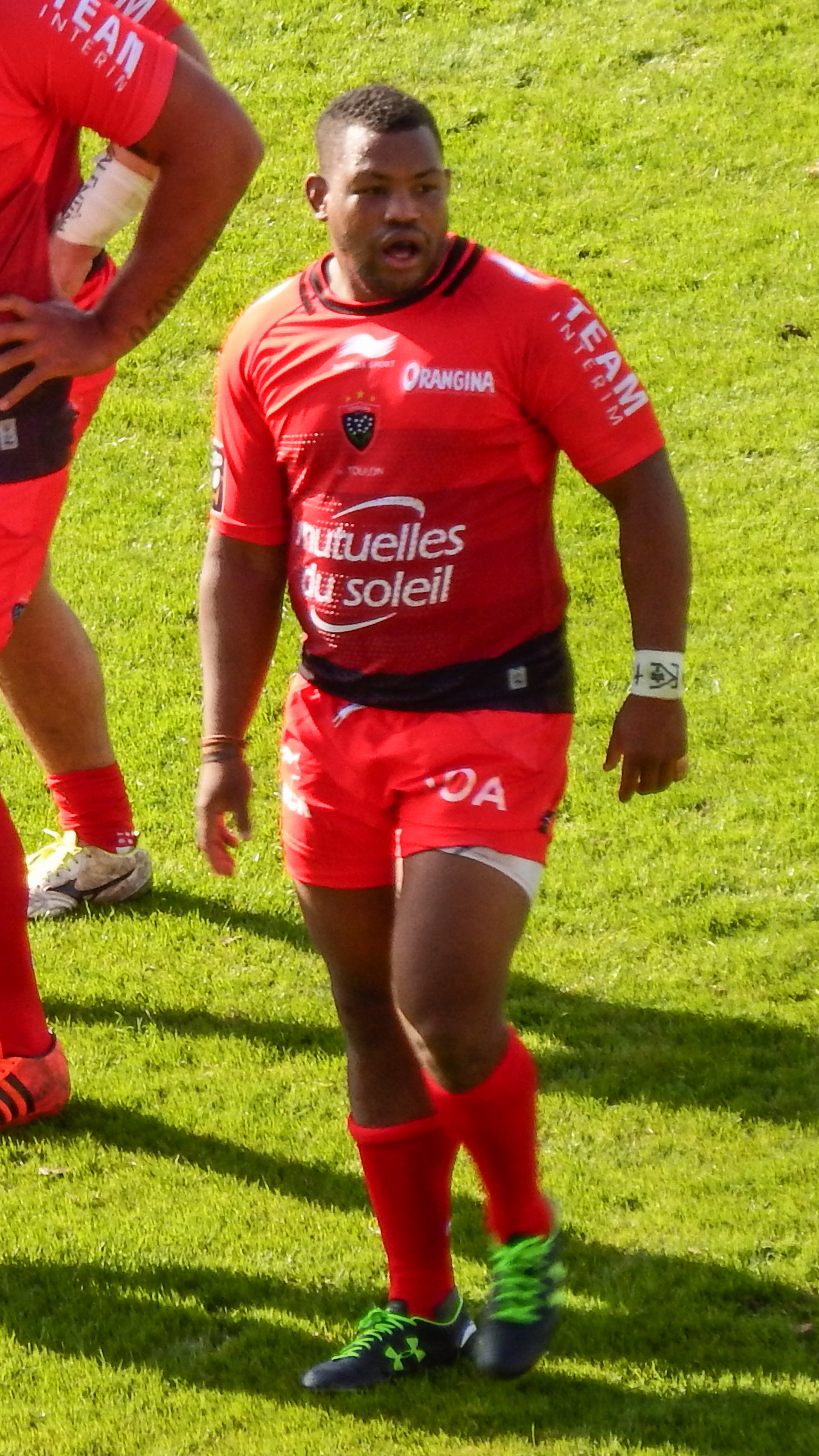
Armitage in 2015

Born in San Fernando, Trinidad and Tobago in 1985, Armitage grew up in the south of France, where he and his brothers played for Rugby Nice Côte d'Azur Université-Racing.

Armitage began his professional rugby career at Saracens, before signing for London Irish in 2006. Armitage started for London Irish in the 2009 Premiership final against Leicester Tigers, which the Tigers won 10–9.

== National team ==
At international level, Armitage was a member of the England Saxons squad that won the 2008 Churchill Cup. On 1 July 2008, he was selected to represent the England Saxons again. Armitage was called up for the England elite squad ahead of the 2009 Six Nations Championship to replace the injured Lewis Moody, making his full international debut in England's 36–11 win against Italy in the opening game. He started both matches in England's drawn two test series against Argentina in June 2009. Armitage went on to win two further England caps in the 2010 Six Nations, coming off the bench in England's wins over Wales and Italy.

== Move to France ==
In May 2011, Armitage was granted an early release from his contract with London Irish to allow him to join French club RC Toulon. In his first season in France, Armitage scored 7 tries in 27 matches. Armitage was in the starting 15 for 23 matches, and a substitute in 4. During this season, Armitage played for Toulon in the finals of the Top 14 and the Amlin Challenge Cup.

In July 2012, Armitage was provisionally suspended for abnormal drug test results., but was cleared to play all the games of the new season with Toulon, both in the Top 14 and Heineken Cup. In November, Armitage was cleared of the doping charge. On 19 November, Armitage was designated as best foreign player in the Top 14 by the Oscars of Midi Olympique (French Rugby Newspaper). In May 2013 he played as a replacement as Toulon won the 2013 Heineken Cup Final by 16–15 against Clermont Auvergne.

Armitage won a second Heineken Cup with Toulon playing against Saracens in May 2014. On 26 May 2014, Armitage was named 2013–14 ERC European Player of the Year. In that same year, Armitage was part of the Toulon side that beat Castres to win the Top 14 title.

In 2015, Armitage won a third European title with RC Toulon, and was again on the shortlist for European player of the year, losing out narrowly to Nick Abendanon who plays for Clermont Auvergne, the team Toulon defeated in the final.

Armitage plays as a flanker and a number 8. He is known for his strength, speed and his effectiveness in ruck turnovers. Armitage has been considered to be one of the best players in the world due to his technical ability at the breakdown and his capacity to win a high number of turnovers each game. Given the English national team's lack of players with Armitage's skill set, many experts have argued that the 'exceptional circumstances' clause in England's policy banning overseas based players should be invoked to allow the triple European Championship winner to represent England, despite playing his club rugby at Toulon.

Despite speculation about a possible return to the English Premiership, Armitage opted to move to another Top 14 team Pau in the summer of 2016 seemingly ending any possibility of earning more international caps for England.

== Later career ==
On 9 July 2019, the San Diego Legion announced that Armitage would join them for the 2020 season in Major League Rugby in the United States, but on 24 September 2019, the San Diego Legion announced it had released Armitage in the wake of his conviction for sexual assault and his suspended sentence, after he had groped a woman in 2018 in France.

After being released from his San Diego Legion contract, Steffon signed a contract to remain in France, continuing his career with Pro D2 side Biarritz Olympique For the 2022-23 season he rejoined his boyhood club Stade Niçois, in the French third division.

== Honours ==
=== Team ===
Toulon

- European Rugby Champions Cup - 2013, 2014, 2015
- Top 14 - 2014

=== Individual ===
- European Professional Club Rugby Player of the Year: 2014
