= David Venditti =

French rugby union player (born 19373)

- Born: 1 June 1973 (age 53) Bellegarde, France
- Height: 6 ft 2 in (188 cm)
- Weight: 224 lb (102 kg)

Rugby union career
- Position: Wing
International career
Years	Team	Apps	(Points)
1996–2000	France	14	(30)

David Venditti (born 1 June 1973) is a French former rugby union international who represented France in 14 Test matches between 1996 and 2000.

A Bellegarde youth player, Venditti started his senior career at Bourgoin-Jallieu. He later moved to CA Brive and was a member of the team which defeated Leicester in the 1997 Heineken Cup final.

Venditti made his debut for France against the Springboks in 1996 and was on the wing in all four matches of France's grand slam winning 1997 Five Nations campaign. He scored a hat-trick of tries in the win over Ireland at Lansdowne Road, which was his first appearance in a Five Nations match.

== See also ==
- List of France national rugby union players
