= Pierre Raschi =

French rugby union player

- Born: 21 February 1971 (age 55) Grenoble, France
- Height: 1.92 m (6 ft 4 in)
- Weight: 105 kg (16 st 7 lb)

Rugby union career
- Position: Number 8
Amateur team(s)
Years	Team	Apps	(Points)
1993-1994	Oyonnax		
2005-2006	SO Voiron		
2008-	SO Voiron		
- Correct as of March 11, 2007
Senior career
Years	Team	Apps	(Points)
1996-2005	CS Bourgoin-Jallieu		
- Correct as of February 2, 2009
- Correct as of March 11, 2007

Pierre Raschi (born 21 February 1971) is a former French rugby union player who spent his whole professional career in Bourgoin, and is currently playing for Fédérale 2 club SO Voiron. He won the European Challenge Cup in 1997 and, the same year, he lost the final of the French championship against Toulouse.

After retiring as a player, he became sport director and then coach of CS Bourgoin-Jallieu until he was fired on April 15, 2008, after a series of bad results.

He joined the amateur club of SO Voiron for the 2005–06 season but played only a few games. He returned for the 2008–09 season and has become a regular in the team.
