= Jean Daudé =

France international rugby union player

- Born: 20 October 1973 (age 53) Nîmes, France
- Height: 1.98 m (6 ft 6 in)
- Weight: 115 kg (18 st 2 lb)

Rugby union career
- Position: Lock
Senior career
Years	Team	Apps	(Points)
-1996	RC Nîmes		
1996-2000	CS Bourgoin-Jallieu		
International career
Years	Team	Apps	(Points)
2004-2008	France	1	(00)

Jean Daudé (born 20 October 1973 in Nîmes), is a former rugby union footballer who played with France and CSBJ, who plays as Lock. His rugby career ended abruptly March 26, 2000 A head impact against head with a player of Castres Olympique (Jeremy Davidson Lock and current member of staff CO) earned him a broken sixth cervical vertebra with a serious contusion of the spinal cord.
