= Alexandre Chazalet =

French rugby union player (born 1972)

- Born: Alexandre Chazalet; 13 March 1972 (age 54) Valence, Drôme, France
- Height: 1.85 m (6 ft 1 in)
- Weight: 105 kg (231 lb)

Rugby union career
- Position: Flanker
Senior career
| Years | Team | Apps | (Points) |
| 1996-2002 | Bourgoin | | |
| 2002-2005 | FC Grenoble | | |
| 2005-2006 | SU Agen | | |
| 2006- | Lyon OU | | |
International career
| Years | Team | Apps | (Points) |
| 1999 | France | 1 | |

Alexander Chazalet, born on 13 March 1972 Valence, Drôme is a retired French rugby union footballer, who played for the French national team, and mainly with the Bourgoin, who played as a third-line.
