= Beaumont-lès-Valence =

- Commune
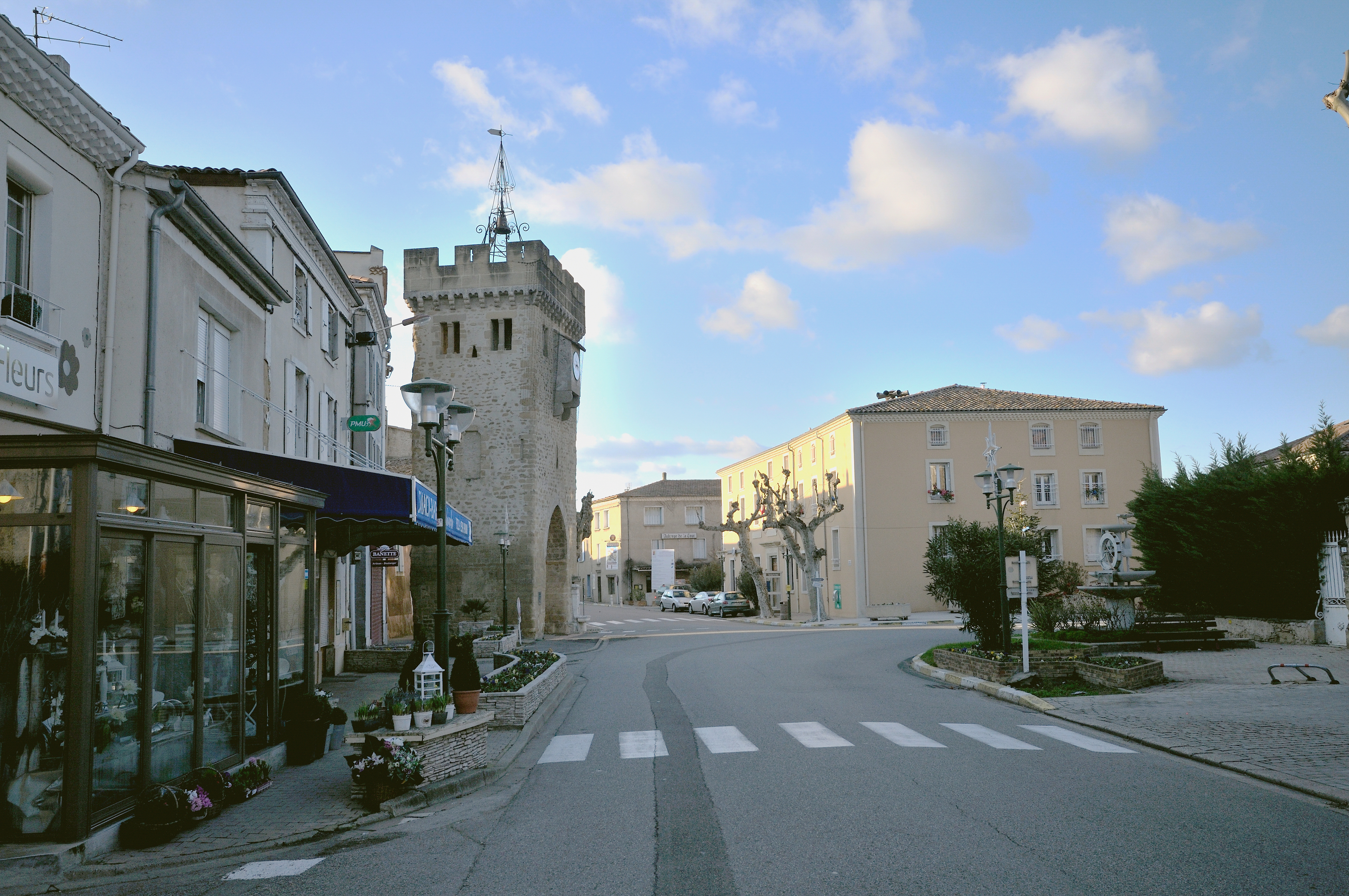
- The tower and the town hall

- Coat of arms
- Location of Beaumont-lès-Valence
- Location within France Location within Auvergne-Rhône-Alpes
- Coordinates: 44°51′46″N 4°56′36″E
- Country: France
- Region: Auvergne-Rhône-Alpes
- Department: Drôme
- Arrondissement: Valence
- Canton: Valence-3
- Intercommunality: CA Valence Romans Agglo

Government
  - Mayor (2020–2026): Cyril Vallon
- Area^{1}: 17.61 km^{2} (6.80 sq mi)
- Elevation: 185 m (607 ft)
- Highest elevation: 221 m (725 ft)
- Lowest elevation: 135 m (443 ft)
- Population (2023): 4,337
  - Density: 246.3/km^{2} (637.9/sq mi)
- Time zone: UTC+01:00 (CET)
  - Summer (DST): UTC+02:00 (CEST)
- INSEE/Postal code: 26037 /26760
- ^{1} French Land Register data, which excludes lakes, ponds, glaciers > 1 km^{2} (0.386 sq mi or 247 acres) and river estuaries.

Beaumont-lès-Valence (French pronunciation: [bomɔ̃ lɛ valɑ̃s], literally Beaumont near Valence; Occitan: Bèumont de Valença) is a commune in the Drôme department in southeastern France.

== Population ==
Historical population
Year	Pop.	±% p.a.
1968	1,333	—
1975	1,873	+4.98%
1982	2,667	+5.18%
1990	3,117	+1.97%
1999	3,679	+1.86%
2007	3,778	+0.33%
2012	3,784	+0.03%
2017	3,649	−0.72%
2023	4,337	+2.92%
Source: INSEE

== See also ==
- Communes of the Drôme department
