= Beauvallon, Drôme =

Beauvallon
- Commune
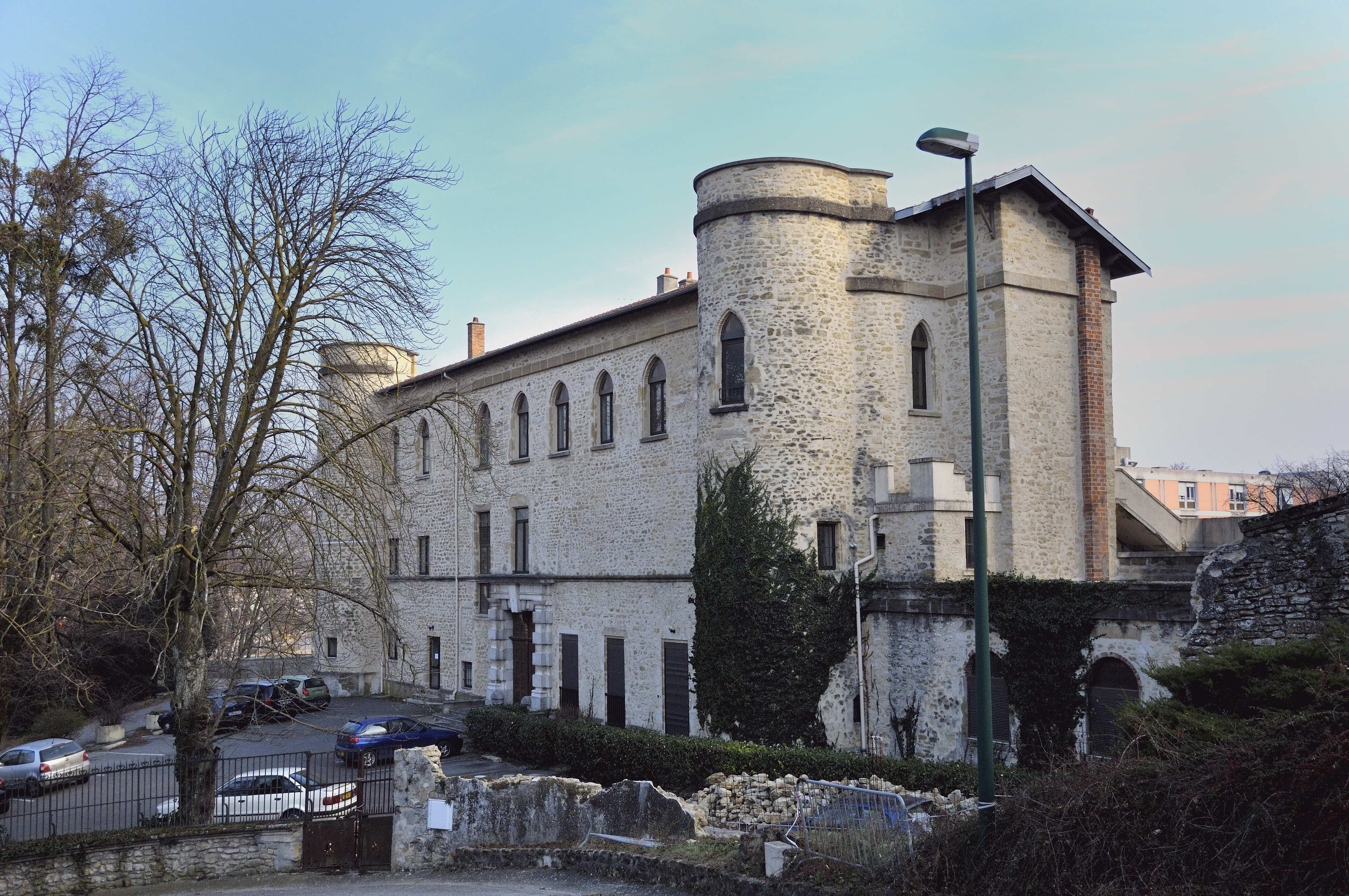
- Chateau

- Coat of arms
- Location of Beauvallon
- Location within France Location within Auvergne-Rhône-Alpes
- Coordinates: 44°51′29″N 4°54′26″E
- Country: France
- Region: Auvergne-Rhône-Alpes
- Department: Drôme
- Arrondissement: Valence
- Canton: Valence-3
- Intercommunality: CA Valence Romans Agglo

Government
  - Mayor (2020–2026): Bernard Ripoche
- Area^{1}: 3.12 km^{2} (1.20 sq mi)
- Elevation: 131 m (430 ft)
- Highest elevation: 200 m (660 ft)
- Lowest elevation: 120 m (390 ft)
- Population (2023): 1,659
  - Density: 532/km^{2} (1,380/sq mi)
- Time zone: UTC+01:00 (CET)
  - Summer (DST): UTC+02:00 (CEST)
- INSEE/Postal code: 26042 /26800
- ^{1} French Land Register data, which excludes lakes, ponds, glaciers > 1 km^{2} (0.386 sq mi or 247 acres) and river estuaries.

Beauvallon (French pronunciation: [bovalɔ̃]; Occitan: Bèuvalon) is a commune in the Drôme department in southeastern France.

== Population ==
Historical population
Year	Pop.	±% p.a.
1968	481	—
1975	975	+10.62%
1982	1,614	+7.47%
1990	1,519	−0.76%
1999	1,685	+1.16%
2007	1,628	−0.43%
2012	1,582	−0.57%
2017	1,591	+0.11%
2023	1,659	+0.70%
Source: INSEE

== See also ==
- Communes of the Drôme department
