= Alexandre Péclier =

French rugby union player (born 1975)

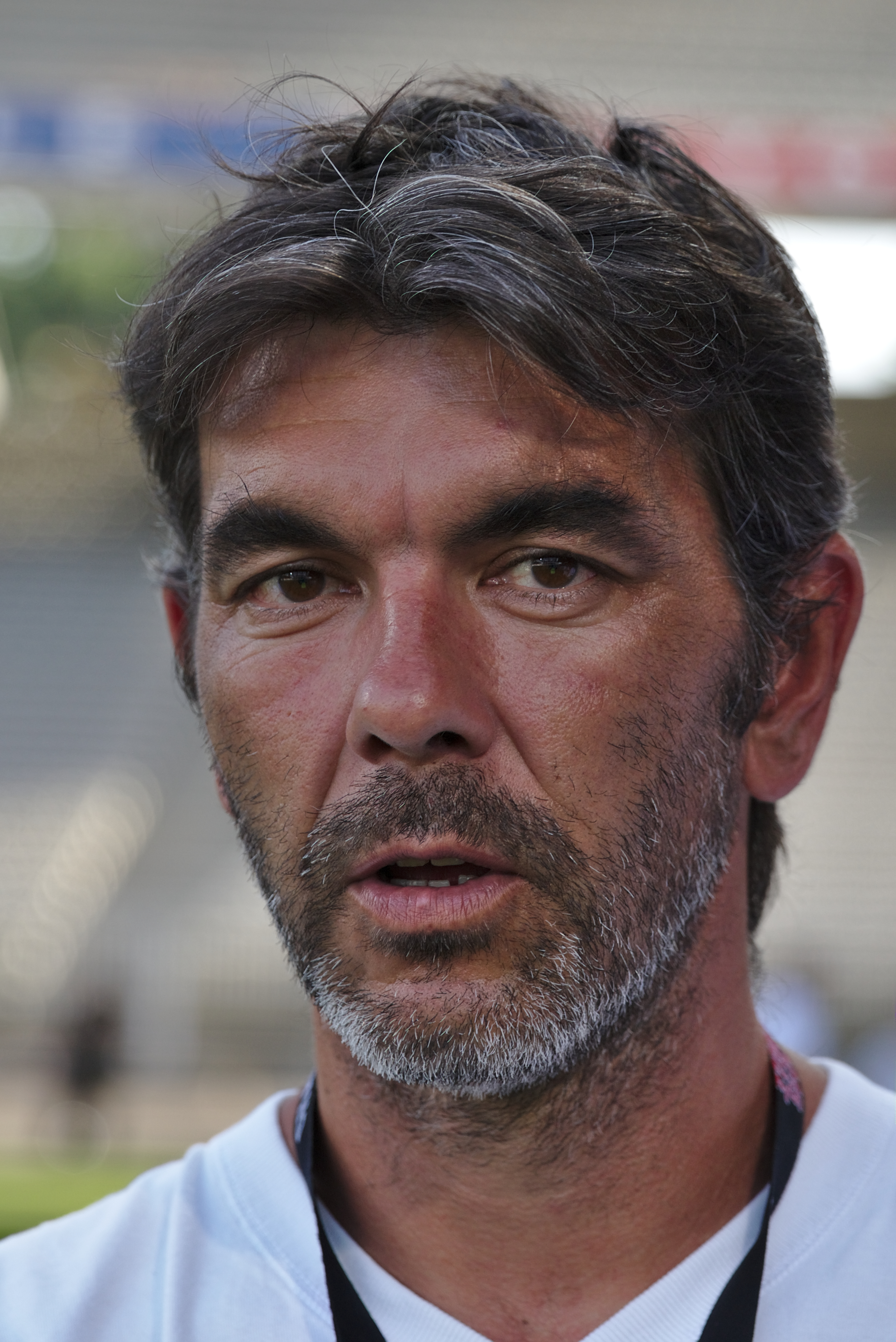
- Born: 26 January 1975 (age 51) Villefranche-sur-Saône
- Height: 1.83
- Weight: 83

Rugby union career
- Position(s): Fly-half, Fullback
Senior career
Years	Team	Apps	(Points)
1996-2006	CS Bourgoin-Jallieu		
2006-	AS Montferrand		
- Correct as of March 18, 2007
International career
Years	Team	Apps	(Points)
2004	France	2	(33)
- Correct as of March 18, 2007

Alexandre Péclier is a French rugby union player who currently plays for the French club of CS Bourgoin-Jallieu. He earned his first cap for the France national team on July 3, 2004 against the United States. He has won the European Shield in 1997 with Bourgoin, where he played during 10 seasons.
