= EPCR Challenge Cup =

Annual European rugby union competition

- Current season or competition: 2026–27 EPCR Challenge Cup
- Sport: Rugby union
- Inaugural season: 1996
- Number of teams: 18
- Nations: England; France; Ireland (Georgia (country)) Georgia; Italy; Scotland; South Africa; Wales
- Holders: (France) Montpellier (3rd title) (2025–26)
- Most titles: (France) Clermont (England) Harlequins (France) Montpellier (3 titles)
- Website: epcrugby.com/challenge-cup
- Related competitions: European Rugby Champions Cup; European Rugby Continental Shield

The EPCR Challenge Cup is an annual rugby union competition organised by European Professional Club Rugby (EPCR). It is the second-tier competition for clubs based in European leagues behind the European Rugby Champions Cup. From its inception in 1996 to 2014, it was known as the European Challenge Cup and governed by European Rugby Cup (ERC). Following disagreements in the structure of the tournament's format and division of revenue, the English and French leagues withdrew to form the EPCR, which organized the Challenge Cup and the Champions Cup since the 2014–15 season.

The Challenge Cup is currently contested between 18 teams; 16 of which qualify from the three main European domestic leagues (Premiership Rugby, Top 14, and United Rugby Championship).

Since the 2023–24 season, two teams outside of the western Europe leagues have been invited to participate in the tournament. These teams are Cheetahs, a South African team who won the 2023 Currie Cup (who use Amsterdam as their home base during the competition) and Georgia's Black Lion, who are the holders of the third-tier Rugby Europe Super Cup. Many more teams had applied to play in the 2024 season of the Challenge Cup, but both the Cheetahs and Black Lion have been invited to each tournament since.

== Format ==
=== Qualification ===
18 teams qualify for the EPCR Challenge Cup in 2023–24.

16 of these teams automatically qualified from the English Premiership Rugby, the French Top 14 and the United Rugby Championship, the 17th and 18th teams are invited to participate.

- Teams from these leagues that do not qualify for the European Champions Cup, either through league position or through promotion, and (in the case of the Top 14) are not relegated to a lower league, will automatically qualify for the Rugby Challenge Cup. Teams promoted to these leagues take up any remaining Challenge Cup places.

==== Continental Shield ====
Until 2019–20 the 19th and 20th teams qualified via a Qualifying Competition, organised by European Professional Club Rugby and Rugby Europe.

For the 2014–15 season, this took the form of a pair of two-legged play-off matches, with the aggregate winner of each taking one of the two Rugby Europe spots in the draw. It involved the two best teams from Italy's Top12, plus a teameach from Romania and Georgia.

An expanded format, which was expected to feature more matches and more nations, for qualification into the 2015–16 European Rugby Challenge Cup, and subsequent seasons, was expected to be announced 15 September 2014. However, on 5 September 2014, it was announced that no such competition would take place during the 2014–15 season, and negotiations continue to create the new competition as soon as possible.

Subsequently, on 22 December 2014, EPCR announced negotiations for a new format for the competition had now been completed, and the Qualifying Competition for entry into the 2015–16 Challenge Cup would begin in January.

The expanded format includes clubs from Rugby Europe member unions Russia, Spain and Portugal alongside representatives from the Italian Eccellenza, and is being jointly organised by EPCR, Rugby Europe, and the Federazione Italiana Rugby (FIR).

The teams in the competition are split into two pools. Each team participates in a pool stage, before the two pool winners compete in a two-legged play-off against the teams currently competing in the Challenge Cup from the previous season.

The winners, on aggregate, of these two play-offs will take up the two final places in the Challenge Cup.

In 2017, the competition was rebranded as the European Rugby Continental Shield, and introduced a final to be held as part of the main finals weekend and contested by the two play-off winners.

=== Competition ===
==== Group stage ====
For the pool stage, there are three pools of six teams. The teams are ranked based on domestic league performance the previous season, and arranged into three tiers. Teams are then drawn from the tiers into pools at random.

Teams will play four other teams in their pool, two at home and two away. Match points will be awarded depending on the result of each game. Teams receive four points for a win, and two for a draw. Teams can also earn a try bonus point for scoring four or more tries, and a losing bonus point for losing a match by seven points or fewer.

Following the completion of the pool stage, the top four teams in each pool will qualify for the knock-out stage. They are joined in the round of 16 by the teams placed 5th in each Champions Cup pool.

==== Knock-out stage ====
The eight quarter-finalists are ranked – pool winners from 1 to 5, and runners-up from 6 to 8 – based on performance in their respective pool. The four pool winners with the best pool record receive home advantage for the quarter-finals against one of the four lower-ranked teams, in a 1v8, 2v7, 3v6, 4v5 format. Unlike the later formats of the old European Challenge Cup, no teams will drop down into the competition from the Champions Cup.

The winners of the quarter-finals will contest the two semi-finals, the semi-final matches will be determined by criteria, and the winners of the semi-finals will contest the final, which is usually held in May.

==== Temporary changes to format ====
Because of the Coronavirus Pandemic the 2020/2021 competition took on a revised format.

A similar format remained for the 2021/22 season, however, the number of teams was increased from 14 to 15 and an additional six will join from the Champions Cup.

The format revision was removed from the 2022/23 season, so with the introduction of South African sides to the EPCR, 16 teams now qualify based on domestic league performance, with two further team invited. For the 2023–24 EPCR Challenge Cup season, the invited teams will be the South African team, Cheetahs, and Black Lion from Georgia.

== Finals ==
The competition has been dominated by French and English clubs since it was first introduced in 1996, reflecting the historical depth of those two leagues. However, teams from Ireland, Wales and Scotland have all made the final of the Challenge Cup, with the trophy twice being won by Cardiff Rugby from Wales, and once by the Irish provincial side Leinster. In 2024, Sharks, a South African professional franchise from the United Rugby Championship, became the first South African and non-European team to win either of the two major European trophies when it won the 2023–24 EPCR Challenge Cup, the fourth URC victory in the competition.

Key
†	Match was won during extra time

European Challenge Cup Finals
Season	Winners	Score	Runners-up	Venue	Att	Referee
1996–97	(France) Bourgoin	18–9	(France) Castres	(France) Stade de la Méditerranée, Béziers	10,000	(France) Patrick Robin
1997–98	(France) Colomiers	43–5	(France) Agen	(France) Stade des Sept Deniers, Toulouse	12,500	(England) Ed Morrison
1998–99	(France) Montferrand	35–16	(France) Bourgoin	(France) Stade de Gerland, Lyon	31,986	(France) Joël Dumé
1999–00	(France) Pau	34–21	(France) Castres	(France) Stade des Sept Deniers, Toulouse	6,000	(England) Chris White
2000–01	(England) Harlequins	42–33	(France) Narbonne	(England) Madejski Stadium, Reading	10,013	(Wales) Nigel Whitehouse
2001–02	(England) Sale	25–22	(Wales) Pontypridd	(England) Kassam Stadium, Oxford	12,000	(Ireland) Alan Lewis
2002–03	(England) Wasps	48–30	(England) Bath	(England) Madejski Stadium, Reading	18,074	(Wales) Nigel Williams
2003–04	(England) Harlequins (2)	27–26	(France) Montferrand	(England) Madejski Stadium, Reading	13,123	(Wales) Nigel Whitehouse
2004–05	(England) Sale (2)	27–3	(France) Pau	(England) Kassam Stadium, Oxford	7,230	(Ireland) Alan Lewis
2005–06	(England) Gloucester	36–34†	(England) London Irish	(England) The Stoop, London	12,053	(Wales) Nigel Whitehouse
2006–07	(France) Clermont (2)	22–16	(England) Bath	(England) The Stoop, London	10,134	(Wales) Nigel Owens
2007–08	(England) Bath	24–16	(England) Worcester	(England) Kingsholm Stadium, Gloucester	16,057	(France) Christophe Berdos
2008–09	(England) Northampton	15–3	(France) Bourgoin	(England) The Stoop, London	9,260	(Ireland) George Clancy
2009–10	(Wales) Cardiff	28–21	(France) Toulon	(France) Stade Vélodrome, Marseille	48,990	(Ireland) Alain Rolland
2010–11	(England) Harlequins (3)	19–18	(France) Stade Français	(Wales) Cardiff City Stadium, Cardiff	12,236	(Ireland) George Clancy
2011–12	(France) Biarritz	21–18	(France) Toulon	(England) The Stoop, London	9,376	(England) Wayne Barnes
2012–13	(Ireland) Leinster	34–13	(France) Stade Français	(Ireland) RDS Arena, Dublin	20,396	(Wales) Nigel Owens
2013–14	(England) Northampton (2)	30–16	(England) Bath	(Wales) Cardiff Arms Park, Cardiff	12,483	(France) Jérôme Garcès
European Rugby Challenge Cup Finals
2014–15	(England) Gloucester (2)	19–13	(Scotland) Edinburgh	(England) The Twickenham Stoop, London	14,316	(France) Jérôme Garcès
2015–16	(France) Montpellier	26–19	(England) Harlequins	(France) Parc Olympique Lyonnais, Lyon	28,556	(Ireland) John Lacey
2016–17	(France) Stade Français	25–17	(England) Gloucester	(Scotland) Murrayfield Stadium, Edinburgh	24,494	(Ireland) John Lacey
2017–18	(Wales) Cardiff (2)	31–30	(England) Gloucester	(Spain) San Mamés, Bilbao	32,543	(France) Jérôme Garcès
2018–19	(France) Clermont (3)	36–16	(France) La Rochelle	(England) St James' Park, Newcastle	28,438	(England) Wayne Barnes
2019–20	(England) Bristol	32–19	(France) Toulon	(France) Stade Maurice David, Aix-en-Provence (Note: Relocated from Stade de Marseille due to COVID-19 pandemic.)	1,000	(Ireland) Andrew Brace
2020–21	(France) Montpellier (2)	18–17	(England) Leicester	(England) Twickenham Stadium, London (Note: Relocated from Tottenham Hotspur Stadium to Stade de Marseille and subsequently to Twickenham due to COVID-19 pandemic.)	10,000 (Note: Capacity limited to 10,000 due to national restrictions surrounding the COVID-19 pandemic.)	(Ireland) Andrew Brace
2021–22	(France) Lyon	30–12	(France) Toulon	(France) Stade de Marseille, Marseille	51,431	(England) Luke Pearce
2022–23	(France) Toulon	43–19	(Scotland) Glasgow	(Ireland) Aviva Stadium, Dublin	31,514	(England) Wayne Barnes
2023–24	(South Africa) Sharks	36–22	(England) Gloucester	(England) Tottenham Hotspur Stadium, London	34,761	(France) Mathieu Raynal
2024–25	(England) Bath (2)	37–12	(France) Lyon	(Wales) Millennium Stadium, Cardiff	36,705	(Scotland) Hollie Davidson
2025–26	(France) Montpellier (3)	59–26	(Ireland) Ulster	(Spain) San Mamés, Bilbao	43,204	(England) Matthew Carley
2026–27				(France) Parc Olympique Lyonnais, Lyon		

=== Wins by club ===
Club	Won	Runner-up	Years won	Years runner-up
(France) Clermont	3	1	1998–99, 2006–07, 2018–19	2003–04
(England) Harlequins	3	1	2000–01, 2003–04, 2010–11	2015–16
(France) Montpellier	3	0	2015–16, 2020–21, 2025–26	
(England) Gloucester	2	3	2005–06, 2014–15	2016–17, 2017–18, 2023–24
(England) Bath	2	3	2007–08, 2024–25	2002–03, 2006–07, 2013–14
(England) Sale	2	0	2001–02, 2004–05	
(England) Northampton	2	0	2008–09, 2013–14	
(Wales) Cardiff	2	0	2009–10, 2017–18	
(France) Toulon	1	4	2022–23	2009–10, 2011–12, 2019–20, 2021–22
(France) Bourgoin	1	2	1996–97	1998–99, 2008–09
(France) Stade Français	1	2	2016–17	2010–11, 2012–13
(France) Pau	1	1	1999–00	2004–05
(France) Lyon	1	1	2021–22	2024–25
(France) Colomiers	1	0	1997–98	
(England) Wasps	1	0	2002–03	
(France) Biarritz	1	0	2011–12	
(Ireland) Leinster	1	0	2012–13	
(England) Bristol	1	0	2019–20	
(South Africa) Sharks	1	0	2023–24	
(France) Castres	0	2		1996–97, 1999–00
(France) Agen	0	1		1997–98
(France) Narbonne	0	1		2000–01
(Wales) Pontypridd	0	1		2001–02
(England) London Irish	0	1		2005–06
(England) Worcester	0	1		2007–08
(Scotland) Edinburgh	0	1		2014–15
(France) La Rochelle	0	1		2018–19
(England) Leicester	0	1		2020–21
(Scotland) Glasgow	0	1		2022–23
(Ireland) Ulster	0	1		2025–26

=== Wins by nation ===
Nation	Winners	Runners-up
France	13	16
England	13	10
Wales	2	1
Ireland	1	1
South Africa	1	0
Scotland	0	2

== History ==
=== European Challenge Cup ===
==== 1996–1999 ====
The Challenge Cup logo used while the tournament was sponsored by Amlin

European rugby competition began with the launch of the Heineken Cup in the summer of 1995.

The Challenge Cup began as the 'European Conference' (later renamed the European Shield) in 1996 with 24 teams from England, France, Italy, Romania, Scotland and Wales divided into four groups of six. All seven of the French teams made it to the quarter-finals with English club Northampton Saints filling the other berth. Predictably, the final was an all-French affair with Bourgoin beating Castres Olympique 18–9 to win the shield.

The following year's competition had an increased entry with eight groups of four teams. Colomiers continued the French dominance of the European Shield, defeating Agen 43–5 in the final.

The absence of English and Scottish clubs in 1998–99 saw the competition reduced to 21 teams divided into three groups of seven teams with representative sides of Spain and Portugal taking part. Once again, a French team was triumphant, with Montferrand beating Bourgoin 35–16 in the final held in Lyon.

With English and Scottish clubs back in the competition in 1999, there were 28 teams split in seven groups of four and London Irish and Bristol reached the semi-finals of the competition, but couldn't prevent another all-French final with Section Paloise crowned champions after a 34–21 defeat of Castres.

==== 2000–2006 ====
The competition structure remained unchanged for the 2000–01 season, although no team from Romania participated. The semi-final draw was an all-English and all-French affair to leave Harlequins and Narbonne contesting the first final on English soil. Harlequins ended French dominance of the European Shield, defeating RC Narbonne 27–26 after extra time in the final.

There was a new sponsor and a name change in 2001. The new Parker Pen Shield saw 32 teams divided into eight groups of four competing for the title. For the first time there were two Spanish club teams (Valladolid RAC and UC Madrid) and Romania was represented. Only one French club reached the quarter-finals along with five English and two from Wales and for the first time no French club reached the semi-finals after Pau lost to London Irish. For the first time, a Welsh team, Pontypridd, made it to the final but Sale Sharks emerged victorious, coming from behind to win 25–22 at the Kassam Stadium in Oxford.

The league format was abandoned in 2002 and the tournament became a knock-out competition. This involved 32 clubs from eight nations, half of them seeded and drawn against an un-seeded team on a home and away basis. The name Parker Pen Shield was now applied to a repechage knock-out tournament for those teams that did not qualify for the second round of the Challenge Cup. The Parker Pen Challenge Cup winner now automatically qualified for the Heineken Cup. London Wasps beat Bath 48–30 to win the renamed Parker Pen Challenge Cup at the Madejski Stadium, Reading.

In 2003–04, the Welsh Rugby Union voted to create regions to play in the Celtic League and represent Wales in European competition. Henceforce Wales entered regional sides rather than the club sides which had previously competed. With a reduction from nine professional clubs to just five, there was no Welsh entry in that year's competition. Romania also did not take part in the Challenge Cup. Harlequins won the cup with a 27–26 last-second victory over Montferrand at the Madejski Stadium to become the first side to win the tournament twice.

Sale eased to victory in the 2005 final 27–3 over a disappointing Pau side. In 2006, Gloucester edged out London Irish 36–34 after extra time.

The Parker Pen Shield was abandoned in 2005 due to restructuring of the European Challenge Cup. The competition reverted to being a league format followed by knock-out phase with five pools of four teams and home and away matches. Romanian interest returned to the competition in the form of București Rugby who had been formed to represent Romania in European competition, however, there was no representation from Spain or Portugal.

==== 2006–2009 ====
Clermont were the first French winners of the title for seven years after they beat Bath in the 2006–07 competition; Clermont also reached the Top 14 final this year after finishing poorly the previous couple of years.

Beaten 2007 finalists Bath won the 2007–08 tournament after beating fellow English club Worcester Warriors in the final in Kingsholm Stadium, Gloucester. Spanish representation resumed in the 2007–08 Challenge Cup when Spanish Champions CR El Salvador took part.

Northampton Saints won the 2009 final after beating Bourgoin 15–3 at the Twickenham Stoop; that season Northampton avoided relegation, they finished 2nd in the regular season of the Guinness Premiership, reached the Heineken Cup quarter-finals and won the Anglo-Welsh Cup the next season. Northampton became the eighth English club to win the competition in 9 seasons.

==== 2010–2014 ====
The competition organiser, European Rugby Cup, announced several changes to the Challenge Cup effective in 2009–10:

- Only the five pool winners will qualify for the knockout stage of the competition. They will be joined by three clubs that parachute in from the pool stage of the Heineken Cup, specifically the third- through fifth-highest ranked second-place teams from pool play. Because of the demise of their third professional side, Scotland representation stopped but now Edinburgh and Glasgow Warriors may play in the competition if they finish 3rd, 4th or 5th best runners-up in the Heineken Cup.
- The European Challenge Cup winner will continue to receive an automatic berth in the following season's Heineken Cup; for the first time, this place will not come at the expense of its country's allocation. The only exception to this new rule will occur when England or France produces the winners of both the Heineken Cup and ECC in the same season. Both countries are capped at seven Heineken Cup places; in that scenario, the Heineken and ECC winners remain in the Heineken Cup while a berth is granted to the top club in the ERC rankings from another country that has not already qualified for the Heineken Cup.

Cardiff Blues benefited from the new format in its first year, winning the first ever Challenge Cup for the club and were also the first Welsh Club to win any European club tournament. Cardiff beat Toulon 28–21 in the final at the Stade Vélodrome in Marseille, which was also the first final to have no English involvement for 10 years.

England made a triumphant return to the final in 2011, with Harlequins defeating Stade Français 19–18. with a try in the last five-minutes by Argentinian wing, Gonzalo Camacho. This meant Harlequins became the first team to win the Challenge Cup three times and with this entered the Heineken Cup. The final was also notable in that it involved two teams that began the season in the Challenge Cup.

The 2011–12 competition was dominated by French sides, with all four semi-finalists coming from that country. Biarritz, which had parachuted in from the Heineken Cup, defeated Toulon to claim their first Challenge Cup.

The 2012–13 season again saw the Challenge Cup claimed by a team that parachuted in from the Heineken Cup. This time, the victor was Leinster, which became the first team from Ireland to win the Challenge Cup.

Northampton Saints won the last edition of the European Challenge Cup in 2014, beating Bath 30–16 in the final.

=== European Rugby Challenge Cup ===
==== 2014–2021 ====
On 10 April 2014, following almost two years of negotiations, a statement was released under the aegis of European Professional Club Rugby announcing that the nine stakeholders to the new competition, the six unions and three umbrella club organisations (Premiership Rugby, Ligue Nationale de Rugby and Regional Rugby Wales), had signed Heads of Agreement for the formation of the European Rugby Champions Cup, the European Rugby Challenge Cup and a new, third tournament, called the Qualifying Competition. On the same day, BT and Sky signed an agreement that divided coverage of the new European competitions. Both would split the pool matches, quarter-finals, and semi-finals equally, and both would broadcast the final. BT would receive first choice of English Premiership club matches in the Champions Cup, with Sky receiving the same privilege for the Challenge Cup. Subsequently, BT have signed an exclusive deal for the Challenge Cup between 2018–19 and 2021–22.

==== 2021–Present ====
The 2023–24 competition saw a new precedent set, with the Sharks of South Africa becoming the first team from outside of Europe to lift the Challenge Cup after an historic 36-22 victory over Gloucester.

== Sponsorship and suppliers ==
=== Sponsors ===
- Parker Pen Company – Title Sponsors of the European Challenge Cup from 2001 to 2005
- Amlin – Title Sponsors of the European Challenge Cup from 2009 to 2014

Following the introduction of the European Rugby Challenge Cup, organisers decided to introduce a Champions League-style sponsorship system, including 3–5 principal partners, in lieu of one title sponsor.

==== Principal Partners ====
- Heineken (2014–)

Heineken, who had sponsored the Heineken Cup since 1995, signed on as the first partner for the Challenge Cup in 2014, and were credited as the Founding Partner of European Rugby

- Turkish Airlines (2015–)

Announced as the second principal partner at the 2015–16 tournament launch, signing on for three seasons

==== Secondary Sponsors ====
- Google and YouTube (2014–)

=== Suppliers ===
- Gilbert – Match Balls (2014–)
- Canterbury of New Zealand – Match Officials Kit (2014–)
- Tissot – Official Watch & Timekeeper (2015–)

Following their appointment as an Official Supplier, Tissot began sponsoring the Match Officials kit.

== Media coverage ==
European markets:

- Austria, Germany, Italy, and Switzerland: EPCRUGBY.TV
- Balkans: Arena Sport
- Cyprus: Cytavision
- France: beIN Sports, France Télévisions
- Georgia: Rugby TV
- Italy: Sky Italia
- Malta: TSN
- Portugal: SportTV
- Spain: Movistar+
- United Kingdom & Ireland: S4C (in Welsh) and TNT Sports and Viaplay Sports (in English)

Other markets:

- Canada and Japan: EPCRUGBY.TV
- Latin America (including Brazil): ESPN
- New Zealand: Spark
- South Africa: Supersport
- United States: FloSports

For Australia, Europe (unsold markets), and Southeast Asia, all matches of the EPCR package (both Champions and Challenge Cups) available on Rugby Pass.

Some games are also livestreamed for free on EPCR TV.

== See also ==
- European Rugby Champions Cup
- European Rugby Continental Shield
- PREM Rugby (England)
- United Rugby Championship (Ireland, Scotland, Wales, Italy & South Africa)
- Top 14 (France)
- Top12 (Italy)
