= CS Bourgoin-Jallieu =

French rugby union club, based in Bourgoin-Jallieu

(France) Bourgoin-Jallieu
- Full name: Club Sportif Bourgoin-Jallieu Rugby
- Nickname(s): Les ciels et grenats (The Sky and Maroons)
- Founded: 1906; 120 years ago
- Location: Bourgoin-Jallieu, France
- Ground: Stade Pierre Rajon (Capacity: 9,441)
- President: Henri-Guillaume Gueydan
- Coach(es): Jean-Henri Tubert and Anton Moolman
- Captain: Bogdan Leonte
- League: Nationale
- 2024–25: 9th
1st kit	2nd kit

Official website
- csbj-rugby.fr

CS Bourgoin-Jallieu is a French rugby union club competing in the third level of the French league system, Nationale.

The club have been runners-up in the French championship and the French Cup competitions, and have won the Challenge Cup.

Founded in 1906 as "Club Sportif Bergusien". They play at Stade Pierre Rajon (capacity 9,441). They are based in Bourgoin-Jallieu in the Isère department in the province of Auvergne-Rhône-Alpes in France.

== History ==
The club was established in 1906 as "Club Sportif Bergusien".

=== 1997 season ===
In 1997 the club had a successful season.

==== Runners-up French Cup 1997 ====
The club contested the Challenge Yves du Manoir final, losing to Section Paloise 13 to 11.

==== Runners-up French Championship 1997 ====
The club made it to the 1997 final of the French championship, where they went down to Toulouse, 12 to 6 at Parc des Princes in Paris.

==== Winners of the European Challenge, 1997 ====
They made it to the final of the Challenge Cup, where they defeated fellow French club Castres 18 to 9 in Béziers. They played in the 1997–98 Heineken Cup, winning two of their 6 pool fixtures, missing out on the finals.

=== 1999 season ===
The club had similar success in various competitions in the 1999 season.

==== Runners-up French Cup, 1999 ====
They again contested the French Cup, which they lost to Stade Français Paris 27 to 19.

==== Runners-up European Challenge 1999 ====
As well as contesting the European Shield final, which they also lost, to AS Montferrand 25 to 16 in Lyon. The club saw similar results in their 1999–2000 Heineken Cup season to that of the 1997-98 competition, winning two of their six pool fixtures, not moving into the finals.

=== Double runners-up French Cup (March 2003 and November 2003) ===
CS Bourgoin-Jallieu also contested the final two French Cup finals, in March 2003. They did however lose both games, being defeated by La Rochelle 22 to 20 in early 2003, and losing to Castres 27 to 26 in November 2003. In the 2002–03 Heineken Cup the club achieved its best result yet, finishing second in their pool, winning four of their six games, but still missing out on the finals. However, their 2004–05 Heineken Cup campaign was not successful at all, losing all six pool games and finishing last in their group.

=== 2006 season ===
For the 2006-07 Heineken Cup home fixture against Munster, Stade de Genève which can hold over 30,000 spectators was used instead of Stade Pierre Rajon. The attendance on the day was 16,255.

=== 2009 season ===
The 2008–09 season saw both a measure of success and multiple relegation dangers. While they reached the final of that season's European Challenge Cup, losing to Northampton Saints, they spent most of the season hovering close to the drop zone. They also faced financial trouble serious enough that they were in danger of forced relegation to Pro D2. CSBJ, however, finished the league season in a safe spot (11th) and were able to provide LNR with sufficient financial guarantees to enable them to stay in Top 14 for 2009–10.

== Honours ==
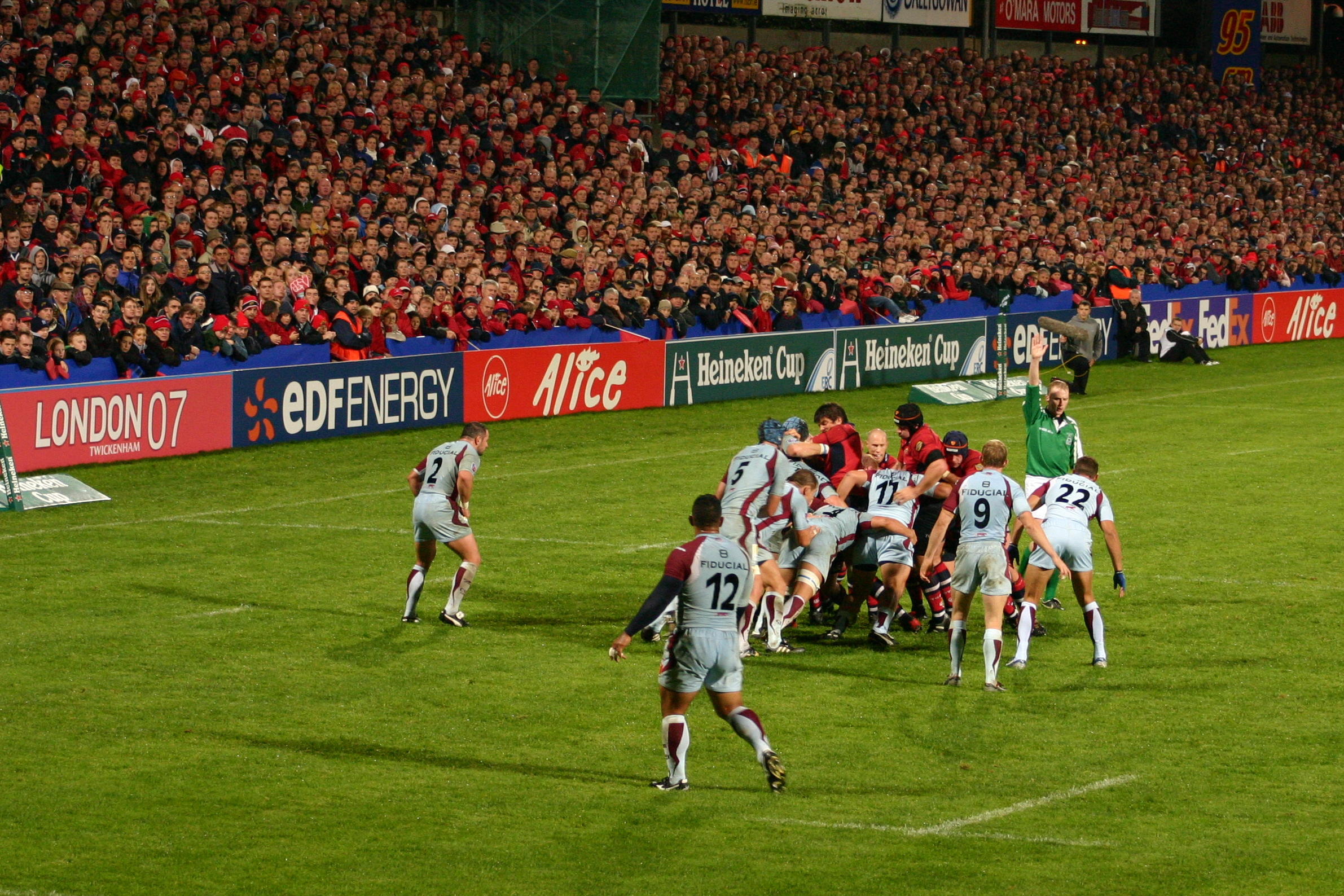
Bougoin playing Munster in Limerick.

- European Rugby Challenge Cup
  - Champions (1): 1997
  - Runners-up (2): 1999, 2009
- French championship Top 14
  - Runners-up (1): 1997
- Pro D2
  - Champions (3): 1965, 1971, 1973
- French Cup
  - Runners-up (2): 1997, 1999
- Group B French Champions
  - Champions : 1984
  - Runners-up : 1982

== Finals results ==
=== French championship ===
Date	Winners	Score	Runners-up	Venue	Spectators
31 May 1997	Stade Toulousain	12-6	CS Bourgoin	Parc des Princes, Paris	44.000

=== European Rugby Challenge Cup ===
Date	Winners	Score	Runners-up	Venue	Spectators
26 January 1997	(France) CS Bourgoin-Jallieu	18-9	(France) Castres Olympique	Stade de la Méditerranée, Béziers	10.000
27 February 1999	(France) AS Montferrand	35-16	(France) CS Bourgoin-Jallieu	Stade de Gerland, Lyon	31.986
22 May 2009	(England) Northampton Saints	15-3	(France) CS Bourgoin-Jallieu	The Stoop, Twickenham	9.260

=== French Cup ===
Date	Winners	Score	Runners-up	Spectators
1997	Section Paloise	13-11	CS Bourgoin-Jallieu	15,732
1999	Stade Français Paris	27-19	CS Bourgoin-Jallieu	22,000

== Current standings ==
2024–25 Nationale season Table
Pos	Team	Pld	W	D	L	PF	PA	PD	TB	LB	Pts	Qualification or relegation
1	Chambéry (Q)	26	18	1	7	666	379	+287	10	5	98	Semi-final promotion play-off
2	Narbonne (Q)	26	19	0	7	633	512	+121	7	4	96	Semi-final promotion play-off
3	Carcassonne (Q)	26	18	0	8	599	440	+159	7	4	92	Quarter-final promotion play-off
4	Périgueux (Q)	26	17	0	9	598	425	+173	6	7	90	Quarter-final promotion play-off
5	Rouen (Q)	26	17	2	7	668	466	+202	7	2	90	Quarter-final promotion play-off
6	Albi (Q)	26	16	1	9	610	514	+96	4	5	84	Quarter-final promotion play-off
7	Massy	26	15	0	11	608	492	+116	6	7	82	
8	Bourg-en-Bresse	26	11	1	14	561	592	−31	3	7	65	
9	Bourgoin-Jallieu	26	11	0	15	538	599	−61	3	4	60	
10	Marcq-en-Barœul (Q)	26	10	0	16	563	649	−86	2	7	58	
11	Tarbes	26	10	0	16	544	639	−95	2	7	58	
12	Suresnes	26	8	2	16	548	626	−78	3	8	56	
13	Langon	26	8	1	17	526	679	−153	2	6	51	Relegation play-off
14	Hyères (R)	26	0	0	26	0	650	−650	0	0	0	Relegation to Nationale 2

Updated to match(es) played on 26 April 2025. Source:
Rules for classification: When two teams have the same points total, position is determined by head-to-head results before points difference.
(Q) Qualified for the playoffs; (R) Relegated

== Notable former players ==
- (Algeria) Issam Hamel
- (Argentina) Matias Viazzo
- (Australia) Josh Holmes
- (Canada) Andrew Tiedemann
- (Fiji) Nemani Nadolo
- (Fiji) Albert Vulivuli
- (France) Alexandre Bias
- (France) Julien Bonnaire
- (France) Benjamin Boyet
- (France) Benoît Cabello
- (France) Marc Cécillon
- (France) Sébastien Chabal
- (France) Alexandre Chazalet
- (France) Arnaud Costes
- (France) Jean-François Coux
- (France) Jean Daudé
- (France) Yann David
- (France) Cédric Desbrosse
- (France) Ethan Dumortier
- (France) Alexandre Dumoulin
- (France) Mickael Forest
- (France) Julien Frier
- (France) Florian Fritz
- (France) Stéphane Glas
- (France) Gaëtan Germain
- (France) David Janin
- (France) Christophe Laussucq
- (France) Xavier Mignot
- (France) Olivier Milloud
- (France) Franck Montanella
- (France) Lionel Nallet
- (France) Sylvain Nicolas
- (France) Pascal Papé
- (France) Morgan Parra
- (France) Alexandre Péclier
- (France) Vincent Pelo
- (France) Julien Pierre
- (France) Pierre Raschi
- (France) Olivier Sourgens
- (France) Marco Tauleigne
- (France) Jean-François Tordo
- (France) David Venditti
- (Germany) Sascha Fischer
- (Germany) Robert Mohr
- (Georgia (country)) Irakli Giorgadze
- (Georgia (country)) Davit Khinchaguishvili
- (Italy) Alberto Di Bernardo
- (Italy) Carlo Del Fava
- (Italy) Federico Pucciariello
- (Ivory Coast) Silvère Tian
- (Namibia) Piet van Zyl
- (New Zealand) Norm Berryman
- (New Zealand) Roger Randle
- (New Zealand) Alex Tulou
- (New Zealand) Karena Wihongi
- (Papua New Guinea) Henari Veratau
- (Portugal) Ruben Spachuck
- (Samoa) Brando Va'aulu
- (South Africa) Rudi Coetzee
- (Scotland) Mark McKenzie
- (Scotland) James McLaren
- (Tonga) Salesi Finau
- (Wales) Chris Wyatt

== See also ==
- List of rugby union clubs in France
- Rugby union in France
