= 2008–09 Scarlets season =

Scarlets
- 2008–09 season
- Chairman: Stuart Gallacher
- Head coach: Nigel Davies
- Celtic League: 5th
- EDF Energy Cup: Group stage (2nd)
- Heineken Cup: Group stage (4th)
- Top try scorer: League: Martin Roberts (6); All: Morgan Stoddart (7)
- Top points scorer: League: Stephen Jones (108); All: Stephen Jones (200)
- Highest home attendance: 14,497 vs Barbarians (31 January 2009)
- Lowest home attendance: 6,041 vs Connacht (13 September 2008)

The 2008–09 season is the sixth in the history of the Scarlets regional side. The season will see the Scarlets compete in three competitions: the Celtic League, the EDF Energy Cup and the Heineken Cup. The season welcomes a change of ground, with the team moving from their home of over 125 years, Stradey Park, to a new stadium in Pemberton named Parc y Scarlets, as well as a change in the team name, dropping the "Llanelli" from their moniker to become the Scarlets.

== Pre-season and friendlies ==
Date	Opponents	H / A	Result F – A	Scorers	Attendance
23 August 2008	Bath	A	16 – 24	Try: Higgitt 47' c Con: Priestland; Pen: C. Thomas (2) 7', 29', Priestland 45'	
29 August 2008	London Wasps	A	20 – 17	Try: M. Jones 40+4' m Pen: S. Jones (3) 18', 42', 56', C. Thomas 71'; Drop: C. Thomas 80+3'	
31 January 2009	Barbarians	H	40 – 24	Tries: Jacobs 3' c, Davies 15' c, Stoddart (2) 21' c, 40+3' m, Roberts 49' c, G. Evans 59' c Con: C. Thomas (5)	14,497
26 March 2009	Newport Gwent Dragons	A	32 – 24	Tries: D. Evans (2) 40+3' c, 46' c, C. Thomas 43' c Con: C. Thomas (3); Pen: C. Thomas	2,755

== Celtic League ==
The Scarlets opened their 2008-09 Celtic League season away to Ulster on 5 September 2008. Despite playing against the wind in the first half, the Scarlets scored an early penalty in the sixth minute, before Darren Daniel scored the first try of the game, crossing in the corner. Clinton Schifcofske scored three penalties in response to make the half-time score 10–9 to the visitors. The Scarlets then took full advantage of the wind in the second half, Stephen Jones putting over two penalties to put the result beyond doubt. The Scarlets' next match came five days later, when they travelled to Rodney Parade to take on the Newport Gwent Dragons. The game looked out of the Llanelli side's reach at half time, as they trailed 25–6, but two unanswered tries from Martin Roberts and Nathan Brew, a conversion and two further penalties from Stephen Jones pulled the score back to 25–24. Brew came close to putting the Scarlets into the lead with 11 minutes to go, but fumbled the ball before he could get to the line, while Stephen Jones put an easy drop goal wide moments later. Fortunately for him, after Robert Lewis conceded a penalty in front of the posts, Jones finally gave the Scarlets a two-point win with three minutes left to play.

The team's next game came just three days later, at home to Connacht in the first of their final three games at Stradey Park. The Irish side opened the scoring with a penalty in the first minute, but those were to be their only points of the match as the Scarlets tore through the Connacht defence seemingly at will. Both Morgan Stoddart and Dafydd James broke the Connacht line before Deacon Manu scored the first try of the game, and then an almost identical one soon after to make the score 12–3 going into half-time. Two more tries came soon after the break, from Jonathan Davies and Nathan Brew, securing the try bonus point for the Scarlets. Man of the match Morgan Stoddart added two more before the end, with his tries separated by one from Mark Jones, to end the final Celtic League game at Stradey Park with a 45–3 win for the home side.

The Scarlets unbeaten start to the season came to an end on 19 September when they travelled to Scotland to play Edinburgh, losing 32–12. The loss meant that the Scarlets' run of being the only team not to beat Edinburgh at Murrayfield continued. It took 26 minutes before the first try came for Edinburgh, and it was not long before they added a second. They could have had a third just before half time, but Mark Robertson knocked on in the in-goal area attempting to gather a bouncing ball. The third eventually did come, however, as did a fourth before the midpoint of the second half. A Morgan Stoddart try was sandwiched between Edinburgh's two second half scores, and Martin Roberts crossed with a minute left to play, but it was too little, too late for the Scarlets. They then suffered a second defeat to a Scottish team in as many weeks with a 34–20 loss to Glasgow Warriors on 26 September. Despite taking a 12–0 lead in the first quarter of the match, the Scarlets found themselves 13–12 down at half-time and conceded another two tries before the 60 minute mark. Mark Jones scored a consolation try with eight minutes to go, but it was nullified by a last minute Glasgow try.

After a two-month break for the EDF Energy Cup, the Heineken Cup and the Autumn internationals, the Scarlets restarted their Celtic League campaign with a home game against Munster on 28 November 2008, their first match at their new stadium, Parc y Scarlets. The two sides exchanged a penalty each in the first quarter of the game, but it was Munster who scored the first try at the ground, Ian Dowling crossing in the 33rd minute. Denis Leamy then scored a converted try shortly before half-time, making the score 15–3 to the Irish at the interval. The second half was largely uneventful until the Scarlets made a late resurgence, being awarded a penalty try in injury time at the end of the game. However, it was not enough to overturn the Munster lead, the match finishing 18–16 to Munster.

Date	Opponents	H / A	Result F – A	Scorers	Attendance	League position
5 September 2008	Ulster	A	16 – 9	Try: Daniel 22' c Con: S. Jones; Pen: S. Jones (3) 6', 42', 58'	7,368	2nd
10 September 2008	Newport Gwent Dragons	A	27 – 25	Tries: Roberts 53' m, Brew 62' c Con: S. Jones; Pen: S. Jones (5) 20', 31', 43', 46', 77'	5,057	2nd
13 September 2008	Connacht	H	45 – 3	Tries: Manu (2), J. Davies, Brew, Stoddart (2), M. Jones; Con: S. Jones (4), C. Thomas	6,041	1st
19 September 2008	Edinburgh	A	12 – 32	Tries: Stoddart 56' m, Roberts 79' c Con: C. Thomas	2,655	2nd
26 September 2008	Glasgow Warriors	A	20 – 34	Tries: S. Jones 5' m, M. Jones (2) 20' c, 72' m Con: S. Jones; Pen: S. Jones 79'	2,450	3rd
28 November 2008	Munster	H	16 – 18	Try: Penalty try 80+4' c Con: Priestland; Pen: Priestland (3) 22', 42', 72'	8,436	6th
20 December 2008	Cardiff Blues	H	27 – 13	Tries: Roberts 38' m, John 62' c Con: S. Jones; Pen: S. Jones (5) 9', 32', 72', 80', 80+6'	7,610	4th
27 December 2008	Ospreys	A	6 – 20	Pen: Priestland (2) 2', 9'	20,520	4th
1 January 2009	Newport Gwent Dragons	H	29 – 24	Tries: King 6' c, John 60' c Con: S. Jones (2); Pen: S. Jones (5) 9', 49', 63', 67', 71'	7,050	3rd
9 January 2009	Connacht	A	17 – 14	Tries: Manu 60' c, S. Jones 74' c Con: S. Jones (2); Pen: Priestland 5'	2,063	3rd
21 February 2009	Leinster	H	17 – 31	Tries: Roberts 33' c, Manu 53' c Con: Priestland (2); Pen: Priestland 30'	6,436	4th
8 March 2009	Edinburgh	H	13 – 6	Tries: D. Evans 5' m, Owens 16' m Pen: D. Evans 80+1'	6,302	4th
4 April 2009	Glasgow Warriors	H	21 – 38	Tries: G. Evans 40+1' m, D. Jones 48' c Con: S. Jones (1/2); Pen: S. Jones (3) 18', 27', 40+4'	6,103	6th
18 April 2009	Ospreys	H	19 – 28	Try: J. Davies 56' c Con: Priestland; Pen: Priestland (4) 20', 25', 40+1', 40+3'	11,444	8th
24 April 2009	Munster	A	10 – 29	Try: Roberts 46' c Con: S. Jones; Pen: Priestland 12'	8,000	8th
8 May 2009	Leinster	A	8 – 45	Try: M. Jones 30' m Pen: D. Evans 23'	11,160	8th
13 May 2009	Cardiff Blues	A	30 – 9	Tries: Williams (2) 27' m, 63' c, Day 43' m, Daniel 80+1' c Con: S. Jones (2); Pen: Priestland (2) 22', 37'	8,212	7th
16 May 2009	Ulster	H	43 – 17	Tries: D. Evans 2' c, Day 17' c, Williams 21' m, Daniel 43' c, Roberts 61' c, Lyons 75' c Con: Priestland (5); Pen: Priestland 13'	6,219	5th

Pos	Club	Pld	W	D	L	F	A	PD	BP	Pts
4	(Scotland) Edinburgh	18	10	0	7	380	282	+98	10	50
5	(Wales) Scarlets	18	9	0	9	376	395	−19	4	40
6	(Wales) Cardiff Blues	18	8	1	9	322	361	−39	4	38

Pld = Matches played; W = Matches won; D = Matches drawn; L = Matches lost; F = Points for; A = Points against; PD = Points difference; BP = Bonus points; Pts = Points

== EDF Energy Cup ==
The Scarlets kicked off their 2008–09 EDF Energy Cup campaign with a 26–17 win away to Saracens on 5 October 2008. Australian Number 8 David Lyons opened the scoring for the Llanelli side, but Saracens responded almost immediately with two converted tries. However, the Scarlets took a 16–14 half-time lead through the boot of Stephen Jones. Saracens retook the lead soon after the break, but a Kees Meeuws try in the 48th minute secured the win for the Scarlets, while Stephen Jones denied the English side a losing bonus point with a penalty in the 63rd minute.

On 24 October 2008, the Scarlets hosted Bristol for the last ever competitive match to be held at Stradey Park. The home side got off to a perfect start, with Morgan Stoddart crossing the try line after just two minutes. Following lengthy analysis by the Television Match Official, Simon Easterby was awarded a try just before half-time, to take the score to 17–0 going into half time. A Stephen Jones penalty 10 minutes into the second half made it 20–0, before former Bristol centre Rob Higgitt scored to effectively put the result beyond doubt. The remainder of the match was spent with the Scarlets seeking the one try that would have given them the bonus point win, but it never came, and they had to be content with a 27–0 whitewash. The result put them in pole position to qualify for the semi-finals, although Northampton were still to play both Saracens and the Scarlets themselves.

Saracens beat Northampton that Sunday, meaning that the Scarlets needed only to avoid defeat to Northampton to qualify for the semi-finals. The match was played at Franklin's Gardens on the Saturday of the following weekend, and started at a blistering pace, with Regan King and Morgan Stoddart scoring tries in the first ten minutes. Northampton hit back immediately through Chris Ashton, who added another in the 29th minute. Ashton's two tries, in addition to a penalty for each side, meant that the half-time score was 13–13. Northampton started the second half the brighter of the two sides, and they took the lead for the first time when Bruce Reihana scored a converted try in the 45th minute. They stretched their lead midway through the half, through Sean Lamont and the boot of Stephen Myler, and, although they suffered a yellow card to James Downey, they held off a Scarlet resurgence to win 33–20 and qualify for the semi-finals.

Date	Opponents	H / A	Result F – A	Scorers	Attendance	Pool position
5 October 2008	Saracens	A	26 – 17	Tries: Lyons, Meeuws; Con: S. Jones (2); Pen: S. Jones (4)	6,068	2nd
24 October 2008	Bristol	H	27 – 0	Tries: Stoddart 2' c, Easterby 40+3' c, Higgitt 66' c Con: S. Jones (3); Pen: S. Jones (2) 14', 49'	10,500	1st
1 November 2008	Northampton Saints	A	20 – 33	Tries: King 5' m, Stoddart 8' m, Davies 72' c Con: S. Jones; Pen: C. Thomas 17'	12,042	2nd

Team	Pld	W	D	L	F	A	BP	Pts
Northampton Saints	3	2	0	1	82	70	2	10
Scarlets	3	2	0	1	73	50	0	8
Saracens	3	2	0	1	74	67	0	8
Bristol	3	0	0	3	39	81	1	1

== Heineken Cup ==
Date	Opponents	H / A	Result F – A	Scorers	Attendance	Pool position
11 October 2008	Harlequins	H	22 – 29	Tries: Stoddart 1' m, M. Jones 12' m Pen: S. Jones (4) 26', 36', 40+4', 51'	8,236	3rd
18 October 2008	Stade Français	A	15 – 37	Try: M. Jones 18' m, C. Thomas 75' c Con: C. Thomas; Pen: S. Jones 14'	10,240	3rd
5 December 2008	Ulster	A	16 – 26	Try: C. Thomas 78' c Con: S. Jones; Pen: S. Jones (3) 10', 28', 47'	10,000	4th
12 December 2008	Ulster	H	16 – 16	Try: Daniel 45' c Con: S. Jones; Pen: S. Jones (3) 17', 53', 77'	8,026	4th
18 January 2009	Stade Français	H	31 – 17	Tries: Lyons 3' c Davies (2) 54' m, 70' c Con: S. Jones (2); Pen: S. Jones (4) 8', 13', 31', 59'	7,417	4th
24 January 2009	Harlequins	A	24 – 29	Tries: Stoddart 56' c, Rees 60' c, Evans 80' c Con: S. Jones (3); Pen: S. Jones 11'	11,083	4th

Team	Pld	W	D	L	TF	PF	PA	+/-	BP	Pts
(England) Harlequins	6	5	0	1	16	144	115	+29	2	22
(France) Stade Français	6	3	0	3	13	131	109	+22	3	15
(Ireland) Ulster	6	2	1	3	13	113	134	−21	1	11
(Wales) Scarlets	6	1	1	4	12	124	154	−30	2	7

== Squad statistics ==
Pos.	Name	Magners League						EDF Energy Cup						Heineken Cup						Total						Discipline	
Pos.	Name	Apps	Try	Con	Pen	Drop	Pts	Apps	Try	Con	Pen	Drop	Pts	Apps	Try	Con	Pen	Drop	Pts	Apps	Try	Con	Pen	Drop	Pts	Yellow card	Red card
FB	(Wales) Dan Evans	7	2	0	2	0	16	0	0	0	0	0	0	0	0	0	0	0	0	7	2	0	2	0	16	0	0
FB	(Wales) Morgan Stoddart	10	3	0	0	0	15	2	2	0	0	0	10	4	2	0	0	0	10	16	7	0	0	0	35	1	0
WG	(Wales) Nathan Brew	3	2	0	0	0	10	1	0	0	0	0	0	0	0	0	0	0	0	4	2	0	0	0	10	0	0
WG	(Wales) Darren Daniel	11	3	0	0	0	15	0	0	0	0	0	0	5	1	0	0	0	5	16	4	0	0	0	20	0	0
WG	(Wales) Matthew Jacobs	2	0	0	0	0	0	1	0	0	0	0	0	0	0	0	0	0	0	3	0	0	0	0	0	0	0
WG	(Wales) Dafydd James	3	0	0	0	0	0	0	0	0	0	0	0	0	0	0	0	0	0	3	0	0	0	0	0	0	0
WG	(Wales) Mark Jones	11	4	0	0	0	20	2	0	0	0	0	0	4	2	0	0	0	10	17	6	0	0	0	30	0	0
WG	(Wales) Gareth Morris	4	0	0	0	0	0	0	0	0	0	0	0	0	0	0	0	0	0	4	0	0	0	0	0	0	0
WG	(France) Yannick N'Gog	1	0	0	0	0	0	0	0	0	0	0	0	0	0	0	0	0	0	1	0	0	0	0	0	0	0
CE	(Wales) Jonathan Davies	16	2	0	0	0	10	2	1	0	0	0	5	4	2	0	0	0	10	22	5	0	0	0	25	0	0
CE	(Wales) Gavin Evans	9	1	0	0	0	5	3	0	0	0	0	0	3	1	0	0	0	5	15	2	0	0	0	10	0	0
CE	(Wales) Rob Higgitt	9	0	0	0	0	0	2	1	0	0	0	5	2	0	0	0	0	0	13	1	0	0	0	5	0	0
CE	(New Zealand) Regan King	8	1	0	0	0	5	3	1	0	0	0	5	6	0	0	0	0	0	17	2	0	0	0	10	0	0
CE	(Wales) Nick Reynolds	2	0	0	0	0	0	0	0	0	0	0	0	0	0	0	0	0	0	2	0	0	0	0	0	0	0
FH	(Wales) Stephen Jones	12	2	16	22	0	108	3	0	6	6	0	30	6	0	7	16	0	62	21	2	29	44	0	200	0	0
FH	(Wales) Rhys Priestland	13	0	9	15	0	63	0	0	0	0	0	0	1	0	0	0	0	0	14	0	9	15	0	63	0	0
FH	(Wales) Ceiron Thomas	7	0	2	0	0	4	3	0	0	1	0	3	5	2	1	0	0	12	15	2	3	1	0	19	0	0
SH	(Wales) Gavin Cattle	6	0	0	0	0	0	0	0	0	0	0	0	4	0	0	0	0	0	10	0	0	0	0	0	0	0
SH	(Wales) Gareth Davies	1	0	0	0	0	0	0	0	0	0	0	0	0	0	0	0	0	0	1	0	0	0	0	0	0	0
SH	(Tonga) Sililo Martens	6	0	0	0	0	0	3	0	0	0	0	0	3	0	0	0	0	0	12	0	0	0	0	0	0	0
SH	(Wales) Martin Roberts	17	6	0	0	0	25	3	0	0	0	0	0	6	0	0	0	0	0	26	2	0	0	0	25	1	0
SH	(Wales) Lee Williams	6	3	0	0	0	15	0	0	0	0	0	0	4	0	0	0	0	0	11	3	0	0	0	15	0	0
PR	(Wales) Craig Cross	2	0	0	0	0	0	0	0	0	0	0	0	0	0	0	0	0	0	2	0	0	0	0	0	0	0
PR	(Wales) Aled Hopkins	1	0	0	0	0	0	0	0	0	0	0	0	0	0	0	0	0	0	1	0	0	0	0	0	0	0
PR	(Wales) Phil John	16	2	0	0	0	10	3	0	0	0	0	0	5	0	0	0	0	0	24	2	0	0	0	10	0	0
PR	(Fiji) Deacon Manu	14	4	0	0	0	20	0	0	0	0	0	0	4	0	0	0	0	0	18	4	0	0	0	20	0	0
PR	(New Zealand) Kees Meeuws	6	0	0	0	0	0	3	1	0	0	0	5	2	0	0	0	0	0	11	1	0	0	0	5	0	0
PR	(Wales) Scott Roberts	1	0	0	0	0	0	0	0	0	0	0	0	0	0	0	0	0	0	1	0	0	0	0	0	0	0
PR	(Wales) Iestyn Thomas	15	0	0	0	0	0	3	0	0	0	0	0	5	0	0	0	0	0	23	0	0	0	0	0	0	0
HK	(Wales) Ken Owens	14	1	0	0	0	5	3	0	0	0	0	0	6	0	0	0	0	0	23	1	0	0	0	5	0	0
HK	(Wales) Emyr Phillips	1	0	0	0	0	0	0	0	0	0	0	0	0	0	0	0	0	0	1	0	0	0	0	0	0	0
HK	(Wales) Matthew Rees	13	0	0	0	0	0	3	0	0	0	0	0	6	1	0	0	0	5	22	1	0	0	0	5	1	0
HK	(Samoa) Mahonri Schwalger	5	0	0	0	0	0	0	0	0	0	0	0	0	0	0	0	0	0	5	0	0	0	0	0	0	0
LK	(Wales) Vernon Cooper	15	0	0	0	0	0	2	0	0	0	0	0	5	0	0	0	0	0	22	0	0	0	0	0	0	0
LK	(Wales) Dominic Day	14	2	0	0	0	10	2	0	0	0	0	0	5	0	0	0	0	0	21	2	0	0	0	10	0	0
LK	(Scotland) Scott MacLeod	3	0	0	0	0	0	1	0	0	0	0	0	2	0	0	0	0	0	6	0	0	0	0	0	0	0
LK	(New Zealand) Simon Maling	4	0	0	0	0	0	1	0	0	0	0	0	2	0	0	0	0	0	7	0	0	0	0	0	0	0
LK	(Wales) Lou Reed	14	0	0	0	0	0	0	0	0	0	0	0	0	0	0	0	0	0	14	0	0	0	0	0	0	0
LK	(Wales) Aaron Shingler	4	0	0	0	0	0	0	0	0	0	0	0	0	0	0	0	0	0	4	0	0	0	0	0	0	0
FL	(Wales) James Bater	0	0	0	0	0	0	0	0	0	0	0	0	0	0	0	0	0	0	0	0	0	0	0	0	0	0
FL	(Ireland) Simon Easterby	11	0	0	0	0	0	3	1	0	0	0	5	5	0	0	0	0	0	19	1	0	0	0	5	0	0
FL	(Wales) Johnathan Edwards	8	0	0	0	0	0	1	0	0	0	0	0	3	0	0	0	0	0	12	0	0	0	0	0	0	0
FL	(Wales) Dafydd Jones	11	1	0	0	0	5	2	0	0	0	0	0	5	0	0	0	0	0	18	1	0	0	0	5	0	0
FL	(Wales) Rob McCusker	8	0	0	0	0	0	0	0	0	0	0	0	0	0	0	0	0	0	8	0	0	0	0	0	0	0
FL	(Wales) Gavin Thomas	5	0	0	0	0	0	2	0	0	0	0	0	2	0	0	0	0	0	9	0	0	0	0	0	0	0
FL	(Wales) Josh Turnbull	9	0	0	0	0	0	1	0	0	0	0	0	3	0	0	0	0	0	13	0	0	0	0	0	0	0
N8	(Australia) David Lyons	18	1	0	0	0	5	3	1	0	0	0	5	6	1	0	0	0	5	27	3	0	0	0	15	0	0
N8	(Wales) Nathan Thomas	3	0	0	0	0	0	2	0	0	0	0	0	1	0	0	0	0	0	6	0	0	0	0	0	0	0

== Transfers ==
=== In ===
Date	Pos.	Name	From
5 February 2008	LK	(New Zealand) Simon Maling	Suntory Sungoliath
20 March 2008	SH	(Tonga) Sililo Martens	Sale Sharks
20 March 2008	CE	(Wales) Rob Higgitt	Bristol
27 March 2008	SH	(Wales) Martin Roberts	Ospreys
2 May 2008	N8	(Australia) David Lyons	Waratahs
18 May 2008	PR	(New Zealand) Kees Meeuws	Castres

=== Out ===
Date	Pos.	Name	To
15 February 2008	SH	(Wales) Dwayne Peel	Sale Sharks
14 March 2008	HK	(England) James Hayter	Released
14 March 2008	PR	(Wales) Ian Jones	Released
14 March 2008	HK	(Wales) Daniel George	Released
14 March 2008	WG	(Wales) Alec Jenkins	Released
14 March 2008	CE	(Wales) Rhys Williams	Released
14 March 2008	CE	(Wales) Rhys O. Williams	Released
2 May 2008	N8	(Wales) Alix Popham	Brive
12 May 2008	CE	(Wales) Matthew Watkins	Gloucester
20 May 2008	PR	(Scotland) Bruce Douglas	Released
20 May 2008	PR	(Wales) Ben Broster	Released
20 May 2008	LK	(England) Adam Eustace	Released
10 June 2008	FB	(Wales) Garan Evans	Retired
28 June 2008	SH	(Wales) Liam Davies	Brive
30 November 2008	WG	(Wales) Nathan Brew	Released
29 January 2009	LK	(Scotland) Scott MacLeod	Released
19 February 2009	SH	(Tonga) Sililo Martens	Released
14 March 2009	FL	(Wales) James Bater	Retired
30 March 2009	LK	(New Zealand) Simon Maling	Released
30 March 2009	FL	(Wales) Gavin Thomas	Released
