= 2009–10 Scarlets season =

Scarlets
- 2009–10 season
- Head coach: Nigel Davies
- Chief executive: Paul Sergeant
- Celtic League: 9th
- Anglo-Welsh Cup: Pool stage (2nd)
- Heineken Cup: Pool stage (2nd)
- European Challenge Cup: Quarter-finals
- Top try scorer: League: Jonathan Davies (6); All: Jonathan Davies (9)
- Top points scorer: League: Rhys Priestland (118); All: Rhys Priestland (190)
- Highest home attendance: 14,739 vs Ospreys (26 December 2009)
- Lowest home attendance: 5,540 vs Edinburgh (4 December 2009)
- Average home attendance: 7,642

The 2009–10 season is the seventh in the history of the Scarlets regional side. The season will see the Scarlets compete in three competitions: the Celtic League, the Heineken Cup and the Anglo-Welsh Cup. The season will be their first full season at Parc y Scarlets.

== Pre-season and friendlies ==
Date	Opponents	H / A	Result F – A	Scorers	Attendance
12 August 2009	Neath	A	16 – 10	Tries: Edwards, Williams; Pen: Newton; Drop: Newton	
22 August 2009	Bath	H	15 – 17	Tries: J. Davies 13' c, Williams 32' m Con: Evans (1/2); Pen: Evans 40+4'	3,098
28 August 2009	Bath	A	3 – 5	Pen: Evans 17'	3,500

== Celtic League ==
Date	Opponents	H / A	Result F – A	Scorers	Attendance	League position
5 September 2009	Leinster	H	18 – 16	Tries: Lamont 6' c, John 65' m Con: Priestland (1/2); Pen: Priestland (2) 40+7', 70'	6,075	3rd
13 September 2009	Glasgow Warriors	A	11 – 19	Try: Evans 32' m Pen: Priestland (2) 40', 55'	2,582	7th
19 September 2009	Munster	H	20 – 22	Tries: Manu 32' c, M. Jones 45' c Con: Priestland (2/2); Pen: Priestland 12', Evans 73'	6,313	7th
26 September 2009	Cardiff Blues	A	15 – 19	Tries: Lyons 70' c, J. Davies 72' m Con: Evans (1/2); Pen: Evans 8'	12,198	9th
2 October 2009	Ulster	A	24 – 45	Tries: J. Davies (2) 67' c, 78' m Con: S. Jones (1/2); Pen: S. Jones (4) 2', 13', 20', 23'	7,950	9th
23 October 2009	Newport Gwent Dragons	H	18 – 3	Pen: Priestland (6) 12', 23', 50', 54', 60', 80+1'	6,464	8th
30 October 2009	Connacht	A	10 – 16	Try: Williams 77'; Con: Newton; Pen: Priestland 57'	1,750	8th
4 December 2009	Edinburgh	H	16 – 17	Tries: Pugh 30' m, Williams 52' m Pen: Priestland 3', S. Jones 69'	5,540	9th
26 December 2009	Ospreys	H	14 – 21	Try: Edwards 79' m Pen: S. Jones (2) 6', 40+1', Priestland 33'	14,739	9th
31 December 2009	Newport Gwent Dragons	A	14 – 9	Try: Priestland 22' m Pen: S. Jones (2) 28', 47', Priestland 76'	6,429	9th
20 February 2010	Leinster	A	14 – 27	Try: Owens 17' m Pen: Priestland (3) 15', 40' 44'	13,890	
5 March 2010	Ulster	H	25 – 8	Tries: Fenby 3' c, Knoyle 21' m, Priestland 61' c Con: Priestland (2); Pen: Priestland (2) 28', 46'	6,266	
18 March 2010	Munster	A	17 – 23	Try: Priestland 2' m Pen: Priestland (4) 33',45',54',77'	8,200	
26 March 2010	Edinburgh	A	20 – 24	Tries: John 30' c, Fenby 67' c Con: Priestland, Newton; Pen: Priestland (2) 31', 43'	2,762	
2 April 2010	Ospreys	A	19 – 27	Try: J. Davies 18' c Con: S. Jones; Pen: S. Jones (4) 3', 31', 55', 73'	13,913	
17 April 2010	Cardiff Blues	H	16 – 39	Try: King 10' c Con: S. Jones; Pen: S. Jones (2) 23', 40'; Drop: S. Jones 29'	10,171	
25 April 2010	Connacht	H	58 – 10	Tries: R. Thomas (2) 9' c, 40' c, McCusker 19' c, J. Davies (2) 23' c, 55' m, King (2) 46' m, 75' m, Turnbull 67' m, Lamont 80+4' m Con: Priestland (5) 10', 19', 24', 40+1', 68'; Pen: Priestland 5'	5,023	
7 May 2010	Glasgow Warriors	H	32 – 37	Tries: D. Evans 8' m, L. Williams 40+6' m, S. Jones 44' c Con: S. Jones; Pen: S. Jones (5) 18', 40', 53', 59', 77'	5,630	9th

Pos	Club	Pld	W	D	L	F	A	PD	BP	Pts
8	(Ireland) Ulster	18	7	1	10	357	370	−13	6	36
9	(Wales) Scarlets	18	5	0	13	361	382	−21	9	29
10	(Ireland) Connacht	18	5	1	12	254	459	−205	4	26

== Anglo-Welsh Cup ==
Date	Opponents	H / A	Result F – A	Scorers	Attendance	Pool position
8 November 2009	Harlequins	A	15 – 15	Tries: Maule 24' c, Fenby 45' m Con: Priestland; Pen: Priestland 12'	9,653	1st
14 November 2009	Worcester Warriors	H	32 – 17	Tries: Daniel 24' c, Lyons 33' c, Evans 47' c, Priestland 49' m Con: Priestland (3/4); Pen: Priestland (2) 7', 40+2'	5,560	1st
30 January 2010	London Wasps	A	18 – 13	Pen: Priestland(6) 10', 16', 23', 35', 51', 79'	8,070	1st
6 February 2010	Cardiff Blues	H	23 – 38	Tries: Priestland 28' c, Williams 35' m, Lyons 40' m Con: Priestland; Pen: Priestland (2) 63', 69'	5,671	2nd

Team	Pld	W	D	L	F	A	PD	BP	Pts
Gloucester	4	2	0	2	87	81	+6	3	11
Scarlets	4	2	1	1	88	83	+5	1	11
London Irish	4	1	0	3	54	70	−16	2	6
Newcastle Falcons	4	0	0	4	41	105	−64	2	2

== Heineken Cup ==
Date	Opponents	H / A	Result F – A	Scorers	Attendance	Pool position
10 October 2009	Brive	H	24 – 12	Tries: Williams 40' m, R. Thomas 78' c Con: S. Jones (1/2); Pen: S. Jones (3) 4', 21', 53', Priestland 68'	8,062	1st
17 October 2009	London Irish	A	27–25	Tries: Evans 12' c, M. Jones 29' m Con: S. Jones (1); Pen: S. Jones (5) 26', 39', 54', 76', 80+'	11,947	1st
12 December 2009	Leinster	H	7 – 32	Try: J. Davies 45' c Con: S. Jones (1/1)	9,012	3rd
19 December 2009	Leinster	A	7 – 39	Try: Priestland 66' c Con: S. Jones (1/1)	18,500	3rd
17 January 2010	London Irish	H	31 – 22	Tries: J. Davies (2) 9' c, 80' c, McCusker (2) 63' c, 67' c Con:Priestland (4/4); Pen: Priestland 39'	7,017	3rd
23 January 2010	Brive	A	20 – 17	Tries: Welch 37' c, Stoddart 44' c Con: S. Jones (2/2); Pen: S. Jones (2) 29', 64'	7,000	2nd

Team	Pld	W	D	L	F	A	PD	BP	Pts
(Ireland) Leinster	6	4	1	1	154	60	+94	4	22
(Wales) Scarlets	6	4	0	2	116	147	−31	1	17
(England) London Irish	6	3	1	2	140	94	+46	3	17
(France) Brive	6	0	0	6	68	177	−109	1	1

== European Challenge Cup ==
Date	Round	Opponents	H / A	Result F – A	Scorers	Attendance
10 April 2010	Quarter-final	Toulon	A	12 – 38	Pen: S. Jones (4) 11', 23', 44', 47'	12,600

== Statistics ==
Pos.	Name	Celtic League						Anglo-Welsh Cup						Europe						Total						Discipline	
Pos.	Name	Apps	Try	Con	Pen	Drop	Pts	Apps	Try	Con	Pen	Drop	Pts	Apps	Try	Con	Pen	Drop	Pts	Apps	Try	Con	Pen	Drop	Pts	Yellow card	Red card
FB	(Wales) Daniel Evans	12+2	2	1	2	0	18	3	1	0	0	0	5	5+2	1	0	0	0	5	20+4	3	1	2	0	28	0	0
FB	(Wales) Daniel Newton	3+3	0	2	0	0	4	0+4	0	0	0	0	0	0	0	0	0	0	0	3+7	0	2	0	0	4	0	0
FB	(Wales) Morgan Stoddart	2	1	0	0	0	5	1	0	0	0	0	0	2	0	0	0	0	0	5	1	0	0	0	5	0	0
WG	(Nigeria) Joe Ajuwa	2	0	0	0	0	0	1+2	0	0	0	0	0	0	0	0	0	0	0	3+2	0	0	0	0	0	0	0
WG	(Wales) Darren Daniel	0	0	0	0	0	0	1	1	0	0	0	5	1	0	0	0	0	0	2	1	0	0	0	5	0	0
WG	(Wales) Andy Fenby	10+1	2	0	0	0	10	4	1	0	0	0	5	5	0	0	0	0	0	19+1	3	0	0	0	15	0	0
WG	(Wales) Mark Jones	5	1	0	0	0	5	0	0	0	0	0	0	2	1	0	0	0	5	7	2	0	0	0	10	0	0
WG	(Scotland) Sean Lamont	14	2	0	0	0	10	0	0	0	0	0	0	7	0	0	0	0	0	22	1	0	0	0	10	1	0
WG/SH	(Wales) Lee Williams	7+5	3	0	0	0	15	2+1	1	0	0	0	5	3+1	1	0	0	0	5	10+7	5	0	0	0	25	0	0
CE	(Wales) Jonathan Davies	16	6	0	0	0	30	0	0	0	0	0	0	7	3	0	0	0	15	23	9	0	0	0	45	0	0
CE	(Wales) Rob Higgitt	4+1	0	0	0	0	0	3	0	0	0	0	0	0+2	0	0	0	0	0	7+3	0	0	0	0	0	0	0
CE	(New Zealand) Regan King	8	3	0	0	0	15	1+1	0	0	0	0	0	1	0	0	0	0	0	10+1	3	0	0	0	15	0	0
CE	(Wales) Gareth Maule	3+5	0	0	0	0	0	4	1	0	0	0	5	0+1	0	0	0	0	0	7+6	1	0	0	0	5	0	0
CE	(Wales) Nic Reynolds	0	0	0	0	0	0	0	0	0	0	0	0	0	0	0	0	0	0	0	0	0	0	0	0	0	0
FH	(Wales) Stephen Jones	6+1	1	4	20	1	76	0	0	0	0	0	0	6	0	6	14	0	54	12+1	1	3	12	0	130	0	0
FH/FB	(Wales) Rhys Priestland	16+2	3	11	27	0	118	4	1	2	11	0	53	3+1	1	4	2	0	19	23+3	6	20	40	0	190	0	0
SH	(Wales) Gareth Davies	1+1	0	0	0	0	0	0+1	0	0	0	0	0	0	0	0	0	0	0	1+2	0	0	0	0	0	0	0
SH	(Wales) Tavis Knoyle	5+5	1	0	0	0	5	4	0	0	0	0	0	1+2	0	0	0	0	0	10+7	1	0	0	0	5	0	0
SH	(Wales) Martin Roberts	12+4	0	0	0	0	0	0+1	0	0	0	0	0	6+1	0	0	0	0	0	18+6	0	0	0	0	0	1	0
PR	(Wales) Jamie Corsi	1	0	0	0	0	0	1	0	0	0	0	0	0	0	0	0	0	0	2	0	0	0	0	0	0	0
PR	(Wales) Simon Gardiner	0	0	0	0	0	0	1	0	0	0	0	0	0	0	0	0	0	0	1	0	0	0	0	0	0	0
PR	(Wales) Shaun Hopkins	0	0	0	0	0	0	1	0	0	0	0	0	0	0	0	0	0	0	1	0	0	0	0	0	0	0
PR	(Wales) Phil John	6	1	0	0	0	5	2	0	0	0	0	0	2	0	0	0	0	0	10	1	0	0	0	5	0	0
PR	(Fiji) Deacon Manu	6	1	0	0	0	5	1	0	0	0	0	0	2	0	0	0	0	0	9	1	0	0	0	5	0	0
PR	(Wales) Iestyn Thomas	7	0	0	0	0	0	0	0	0	0	0	0	2	0	0	0	0	0	9	0	0	0	0	0	0	0
PR	(Wales) Rhys M. Thomas	2	0	0	0	0	0	0	0	0	0	0	0	1	1	0	0	0	5	3	1	0	0	0	5	2	0
HK	(Wales) Rhys Lawrence	0	0	0	0	0	0	0	0	0	0	0	0	0	0	0	0	0	0	0	0	0	0	0	0	0	0
HK	(Wales) Ken Owens	7	0	0	0	0	0	2	0	0	0	0	0	2	0	0	0	0	0	11	0	0	0	0	0	0	0
HK	(Wales) Emyr Phillips	1	0	0	0	0	0	2	0	0	0	0	0	0	0	0	0	0	0	3	0	0	0	0	0	0	0
HK	(Wales) Matthew Rees	3	0	0	0	0	0	0	0	0	0	0	0	2	0	0	0	0	0	5	0	0	0	0	0	0	0
LK	(Wales) Vernon Cooper	7	0	0	0	0	0	1	0	0	0	0	0	2	0	0	0	0	0	10	0	0	0	0	0	1	0
LK	(Wales) Dominic Day	5	0	0	0	0	0	1	0	0	0	0	0	2	0	0	0	0	0	8	0	0	0	0	0	0	0
LK	(Wales) Lou Reed	6	0	0	0	0	0	1	0	0	0	0	0	2	0	0	0	0	0	9	0	0	0	0	0	0	0
LK	(Wales) Aaron Shingler	1	0	0	0	0	0	1	0	0	0	0	0	0	0	0	0	0	0	2	0	0	0	0	0	0	0
FL	(Ireland) Simon Easterby	6	0	0	0	0	0	0	0	0	0	0	0	2	0	0	0	0	0	8	0	0	0	0	0	1	0
FL	(Wales) Johnathan Edwards	1	0	0	0	0	0	2	0	0	0	0	0	0	0	0	0	0	0	3	0	0	0	0	0	0	0
FL	(Wales) Dafydd Jones	5	0	0	0	0	0	0	0	0	0	0	0	2	0	0	0	0	0	7	0	0	0	0	0	0	0
FL	(Wales) Rob McCusker	0	0	0	0	0	0	1	0	0	0	0	0	0	0	0	0	0	0	1	0	0	0	0	0	0	0
FL	(Wales) Richie Pugh	7	0	0	0	0	0	2	0	0	0	0	0	2	0	0	0	0	0	11	0	0	0	0	0	1	0
FL	(Wales) Josh Turnbull	2	0	0	0	0	0	2	0	0	0	0	0	0	0	0	0	0	0	4	0	0	0	0	0	0	0
N8	(Australia) David Lyons	7	1	0	0	0	5	1	1	0	0	0	5	2	0	0	0	0	0	10	2	0	0	0	10	0	0
N8	(England) Ben Morgan	0	0	0	0	0	0	0	0	0	0	0	0	0	0	0	0	0	0	0	0	0	0	0	0	0	0
N8	(Wales) Damien Welch	2	0	0	0	0	0	2	0	0	0	0	0	0	0	0	0	0	0	4	0	0	0	0	0	0	0

Stats accurate as of match played 14 November 2009

== Transfers ==
=== In ===
Date Confirmed	Pos.	Name	From
26 March 2009	PR	(Wales) Rhys M. Thomas	Newport Gwent Dragons
2 May 2009	WG	(Scotland) Sean Lamont	Northampton Saints
19 May 2009	CE	(Wales) Gareth Maule	Newport Gwent Dragons
22 May 2009	SH	(Wales) Tavis Knoyle	Neath RFC
29 May 2009	WG	(Wales) Andy Fenby	Newcastle Falcons
29 May 2009	FL	(Wales) Richie Pugh	Exeter Chiefs
29 May 2009	FL	(Wales) Damien Welch	Cardiff RFC
5 August 2009	PR	(Wales) Jamie Corsi	Newport Gwent Dragons
5 August 2009	HK	(Wales) Rhys Lawrence	Tonmawr RFC
5 August 2009	N8	(England) Ben Morgan	Merthyr RFC

=== Out ===
Date Confirmed	Pos.	Name	To
18 March 2009	CE	(Wales) Gavin Evans	Cardiff Blues
30 March 2009	LK	(New Zealand) Simon Maling	Released
30 March 2009	FL	(Wales) Gavin Thomas	Released
21 April 2009	WG	(Wales) Dafydd James	Released
24 April 2009	HK	(Samoa) Mahonri Schwalger	Sale Sharks
30 April 2009	SH	(Wales) Gavin Cattle	Cornish Pirates
29 May 2009	N8	(Wales) Nathan Thomas	Released
12 June 2009	PR	(Wales) Scott Roberts	Coventry RFC
30 June 2009	FH	(Wales) Ceiron Thomas	Leeds Carnegie
4 July 2009	PR	(New Zealand) Kees Meeuws	Released
