= Rhys Priestland =

Welsh rugby union player

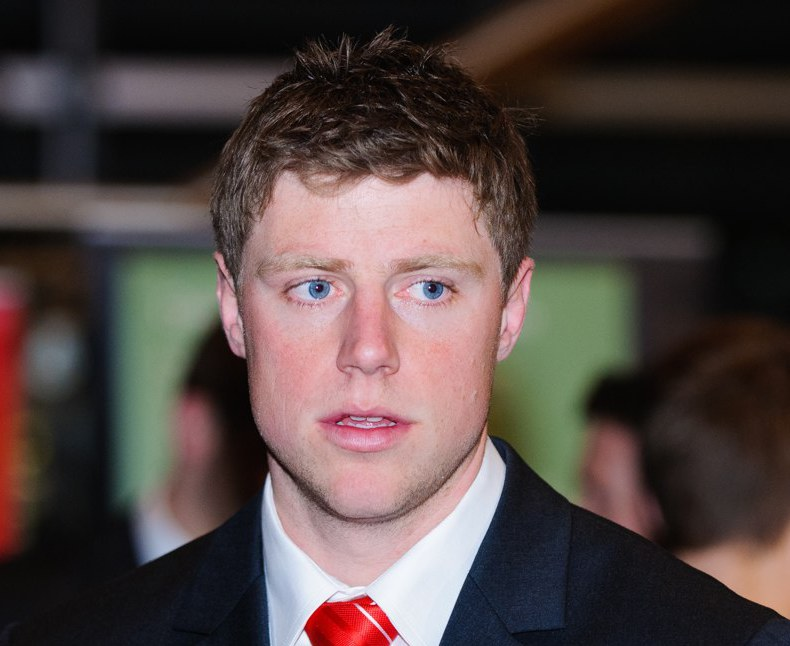
- Priestland at the Wales Grand Slam Celebration, 19 March 2012
- Born: Rhys Priestland; 9 January 1987 (age 39) Llangathen, Wales
- Height: 183 cm (6 ft 0 in)
- Weight: 95 kg (14 st 13 lb; 209 lb)
- School: Ysgol Gyfun Gymraeg Bro Myrddin
- University: Swansea University

Rugby union career
- Position(s): Fly-half, Full back
- Current team: Cardiff Rugby
Senior career
| Years | Team | Apps | (Points) |
| 2006–2009 | Llanelli RFC | 32 | (175) |
| 2007–2015 | Scarlets | 150 | (1,064) |
| 2015–2021 | Bath | 120 | (893) |
| 2021–2023 | Cardiff Rugby | 18 | (88) |
International career
| Years | Team | Apps | (Points) |
- Wales U19
- Wales U21
| 2011–2022 | Wales | 52 | (111) |

Rhys Priestland (born 9 January 1987) is a retired Welsh international rugby union player who last played as a fly-half for Cardiff Rugby and the Wales national team. Although he primarily played as a fly-half, he was also capable of playing at full-back. Born in Llangathen, Carmarthenshire, he began his career with Llanelli RFC before progressing to the Scarlets regional side. After eight years with the Scarlets, he moved to England to play for Bath in the English Premiership, where he spent six seasons before returning to Wales with Cardiff Rugby. He made his Wales debut in 2011, and earned 50 caps – including being named in the squad for the 2011 and 2015 Rugby World Cups – before his move to England made him ineligible for selection.

== Club career ==
A product of the Scarlets academy, Priestland began his senior rugby career with Scarlets feeder club Carmarthen Quins, making six appearances in the 2005–06 season. In March 2006, he signed a professional development contract with the Scarlets. That summer, former Scarlets fly-half Stephen Jones returned to the region after two seasons in France with Clermont Auvergne, and for the 2006–07 season, Priestland served as the Scarlets' third-choice fly-half behind Jones and Ceiron Thomas.

Priestland played 150 games for them and scored over 1,000 points. In the 2010–11 season against USA Perpignan, he scored a try at the end of the first half which the Scarlets won.

In January 2015, it was announced that Priestland would join English club Bath on a two-year contract at the end of the 2014–15 season. He ended up playing for Bath for six seasons before returning to Wales for the 2021–22 season, signing a long-term contract with the Cardiff Blues (later renamed Cardiff Rugby). He made his debut in Cardiff's 2021–22 United Rugby Championship season opener against Connacht on 24 September 2021, but had to be substituted in the first two minutes after being hit in the head by the knee of Connacht prop Finlay Bealham. He recovered from the injury in time to start the match against the Ospreys on 2 October; he played the full match and scored two conversions, but Cardiff lost the match 18–14. He scored 14 of Cardiff's 19 points the following week against the Bulls, but it was not enough to prevent a 29–19 defeat, and followed it up with another 13 points in a 23–17 win over the Sharks on 16 October.

== International career ==
A member of the Wales under-19 squad that won the Grand Slam in the 2006 Six Nations, Priestland received his first senior call-up in January 2011 as part of a 28-man squad for the 2011 Six Nations Championship, as one of three fly-half options along with Stephen Jones and James Hook. After being an unused replacement for the 26–19 loss to England in the opening match, Priestland made his international debut on 12 February 2011, making a four-minute cameo at full-back in a 24–6 win over Scotland at Murrayfield. He was again named on the bench for Wales' third match against Italy, but did not come on, before being left out of the squad entirely for the final two matches against Ireland and France.

Priestland's good form for the Scarlets in the remainder of the 2010–11 season meant he returned to the Wales set-up for a match against the Barbarians in June 2011, coming on as a late substitute for Stephen Jones as Wales lost 31–28, before being included in a 39-man training squad ahead of the 2011 Rugby World Cup. In his first start for Wales, against England at Twickenham on 6 August 2011, Priestland was initially selected at full-back, but made a last-minute switch to fly-half after Stephen Jones was injured in the warm-up; Priestland kicked two conversions in a 23–19 loss. He again started at fly-half in the return match at the Millennium Stadium on 13 August, scoring two penalties before being replaced by Aled Brew at half-time; Wales won the match 19–9. Having seemingly done enough to earn a place in Warren Gatland's World Cup squad, Priestland was left out of the final warm-up match against Argentina.

As with the 2011 Six Nations, Priestland was one of three fly-halves selected by Gatland for the World Cup, along with Jones and Hook. With Jones still struggling with a calf injury, Priestland was named as Wales' starting fly-half for their opening match against reigning champions South Africa. With South Africa leading by a point with 10 minutes to go, Priestland had the opportunity to win the match with a drop goal in front of the posts, but he hooked it wide. Nevertheless, he retained the number 10 jersey for the second match against Samoa, scoring two penalties in a 17–10 win. Jones returned to the starting XV for the match against bottom side Namibia, playing 63 minutes before Priestland took over and scored three of his five conversion attempts, but Priestland was again the starting fly-half for Wales' final pool match against Fiji; they won the match 66–0, with Priestland scoring five conversions and a penalty before being replaced by Jones for the final 20 minutes.

Having seemingly won the fly-half battle, Priestland again started against Ireland in the quarter-finals, converting two of Wales' three tries in a 22–10 win, only to suffer a shoulder injury in the last two minutes that meant he missed the semi-final against France. Wales lost the match 9–8 and ultimately finished the tournament in fourth place, after losing to 21–18 to Australia in the third-place play-off.

Priestland returned to fitness in time to play in Wales' friendly match against Australia on 3 December 2011, starting ahead of Ospreys fly-half Dan Biggar. In addition to scoring two penalties, Priestland also crossed for his first international try as Wales lost 24–18. For the 2012 Six Nations Championship, Gatland selected Priestland and Hook as his two fly-half options, with Priestland starting all five matches, despite entering the tournament with lingering knee injuries. In the third match against England, he received the first yellow card of his international career. Full-back Leigh Halfpenny was given the goal-kicking duties during the tournament, so Priestland scored just three points: a penalty against Italy in the fourth match. Wales won all five of their matches in the 2012 Six Nations, claiming their third Grand Slam title in eight seasons.

However, following the Six Nations success, Wales suffered a 3–0 test series defeat to Australia on their summer tour and then failed to win any of their Autumn internationals; Priestland played in all seven of those matches, starting six of them and suffered a loss of confidence that saw him leave social media and start seeing a sports psychologist. In addition, he suffered a torn Achilles tendon in a match for the Scarlets in early December 2012, ruling him out of Wales' Six Nations title defence in 2013. After returning to the bench for the Scarlets at the end of the season, Priestland was named in the squad for Wales' summer tour of Japan; however, a recurrence of the injury meant he had to withdraw from the tour. He finally made his return to international rugby in November 2013, starting at fly-half in Wales' opening match of the 2013 Autumn internationals against South Africa; he played the entire match, but Wales lost 24–15. Priestland then missed the next game against Argentina, before making substitute appearances against both Tonga and Australia.

Priestland regained the starting job for the 2014 Six Nations, but Wales won just two of the four matches in which he started, and he was dropped to the bench for the final game against Scotland. A knee injury suffered in the Scarlets' final game of the 2013–14 season meant Priestland again missed Wales' summer tour to South Africa in 2014. A groin strain for Biggar saw Priestland return to Wales action as a substitute in their 33–28 loss to Australia on 8 November, before starting the match against Fiji on 15 November; he kicked a conversion in each game, but both were in front of the posts after penalty tries. With Biggar now established as Wales' first-choice fly-half, Priestland was named among the substitutes for every match in the 2015 Six Nations, coming on just twice, against France and Italy, and playing a total of just 16 minutes of rugby. As a result of his move to Bath at the end of the 2014–15 season, ahead of the 2015 Rugby World Cup, Priestland only appeared in one warm-up match, coming off the bench in a 16–10 away win over Ireland; he was also an unused substitute for a match against Italy a week later. Despite this lack of game time, Gatland named Priestland in his squad for the tournament, even giving him the starting role in the opening match against Uruguay. Priestland kicked seven of his eight conversion attempts, leading Wales to a 54–9 win. Biggar returned to start the remaining three pool matches, as well as the quarter-final loss to South Africa, but Priestland appeared off the bench each time.

After the World Cup, Priestland announced his intention to take an 18-month break from international duty, a decision that former Wales fly-half Phil Bennett suggested would put a permanent end to Priestland's international career; however, two months later, Priestland reversed his decision in the hope of being picked in the Wales squad for the 2016 Six Nations. He was ultimately selected for the tournament, and made an appearance off the bench in the opening match against Ireland after Biggar suffered an early injury; he scored 11 points in the match, landing a conversion and three penalties, but missed a late drop goal attempt as the match finished 16–16. Biggar recovered in time to keep the starting job for the next game against Scotland, and in each of the next three games, Priestland was restricted to no more than cameo appearances in the final 10 minutes, although he did land two conversions as Wales mounted a late, but unsuccessful comeback against England. With Wales leading 46–7 in the final match against Italy, Priestland came on to play the final 22 minutes, and was successful with all three of his conversion attempts as Wales went on to win 67–14. That summer, Priestland was again picked for Wales' tour of New Zealand; ahead of the tour, he appeared in the final 25 minutes of their 27–13 loss to England at Twickenham. He was then left out of the first test against New Zealand, but after he scored a conversion in Wales' 40–7 loss to the Chiefs, he replaced the injured Gareth Anscombe as Biggar's back-up and came off the bench in each of the last two tests, setting up a try for Liam Williams in the second test.

In September 2016, the Welsh Rugby Union (WRU) changed its selection policy, referred to as "Gatland's Law", so that only three players based outside Wales could be selected for international matches. With Priestland having to compete with the likes of George North, Jamie Roberts and his Bath teammate Taulupe Faletau for those places, he was left out of the Wales squad for the 2016 Autumn internationals. In September 2017, more than a year after his last cap, Priestland said he would be surprised if he played for Wales again. The WRU again changed its selection policy in October 2017, so that any player who signed a contract with a club outside Wales before then could be selected again, although their continued selection would depend on them returning to Wales at the end of their contracts; that meant Priestland was again eligible to play for Wales, and his club form led to him being picked for the 2017 Autumn internationals. He missed the first match against Australia, but then started the match against Georgia; he played the entire 80 minutes and was successful with all three of his kicks at goal, contributing eight of Wales' points in a 13–6 win. He was on the bench for Wales' third match against New Zealand, but replaced Biggar for the final 17 minutes of the game, earning his 50th test cap. Wales' next match against South Africa was on 2 December, outside the World Rugby international window, which meant Priestland was unavailable as he had to return to his club side. Priestland picked up a hamstring injury in January 2018, but nevertheless he was selected for the 2018 Six Nations; however, the injury proved severe enough that he did not take part in the tournament.

Following his return to Wales with Cardiff Rugby, Priestland became eligible for Wales selection again and was called up to the squad for the 2021 Autumn internationals. In the opening match against New Zealand on 30 October 2021, he came on for Gareth Anscombe in the 47th minute, and scored a penalty and a conversion in a 54–16 defeat. Priestland came off the bench against Australia and kicked a late penalty to secure a 29–28 victory for Wales. In January 2022, he was named in the Wales squad for the 2022 Six Nations Championship; however, he suffered a calf injury early in training for the tournament, and on 1 March 2022, he was released back to his club for treatment. The injury also kept him out of Wales' tour of South Africa, but he returned to the side for the 2022 Autumn internationals. He started the opening game against New Zealand, his first international start since November 2017. He also started the game against Georgia, and came on as a replacement against Argentina and Australia.

=== International tries ===
| Try | Opponent | Location | Venue | Competition | Date | Result |
|---|---|---|---|---|---|---|
| 1 | Australia | Cardiff, Wales | Millennium Stadium | 2011 Autumn International | 3 December 2011 | Loss |

== Statistics ==
| Club | Season | League | | | | | | Anglo-Welsh Cup | | | | | | Europe | | | | | | Total | | | | | |
| Club | Season | Apps | T | C | P | D | Pts | Apps | T | C | P | D | Pts | Apps | T | C | P | D | Pts | Apps | T | C | P | D | Pts |
|---|---|---|---|---|---|---|---|---|---|---|---|---|---|---|---|---|---|---|---|---|---|---|---|---|---|
| Scarlets | 2007–08 | 13 | 2 | 17 | 21 | 0 | 107 | 1 | 0 | 0 | 1 | 0 | 3 | 3 | 0 | 2 | 3 | 0 | 13 | 17 | 2 | 19 | 25 | 0 | 123 |
| Scarlets | 2008–09 | 13 | 0 | 9 | 15 | 0 | 63 | 0 | 0 | 0 | 0 | 0 | 0 | 1 | 0 | 0 | 0 | 0 | 0 | 14 | 0 | 9 | 15 | 0 | 63 |
| Scarlets | 2009–10 | 18 | 3 | 11 | 27 | 0 | 118 | 4 | 2 | 5 | 11 | 0 | 53 | 4 | 1 | 4 | 2 | 0 | 19 | 26 | 6 | 20 | 40 | 0 | 190 |
| Scarlets | 2010–11 | 18 | 3 | 13 | 37 | 2 | 158 | 0 | 0 | 0 | 0 | 0 | 0 | 6 | 2 | 5 | 5 | 0 | 35 | 24 | 5 | 18 | 42 | 2 | 193 |
| Scarlets | 2011–12 | 6 | 0 | 9 | 17 | 0 | 69 | 0 | 0 | 0 | 0 | 0 | 0 | 7 | 1 | 5 | 9 | 0 | 42 | 13 | 1 | 14 | 26 | 0 | 111 |
| Scarlets | 2012–13 | 9 | 0 | 7 | 7 | 1 | 38 | 0 | 0 | 0 | 0 | 0 | 0 | 3 | 0 | 2 | 6 | 1 | 25 | 12 | 0 | 9 | 13 | 2 | 63 |
| Scarlets | 2013–14 | 14 | 1 | 12 | 26 | 0 | 107 | 0 | 0 | 0 | 0 | 0 | 0 | 6 | 0 | 8 | 16 | 0 | 64 | 20 | 1 | 20 | 42 | 0 | 171 |
| Scarlets | 2014–15 | 18 | 0 | 19 | 23 | 1 | 110 | 0 | 0 | 0 | 0 | 0 | 0 | 6 | 0 | 2 | 12 | 0 | 40 | 24 | 0 | 21 | 35 | 1 | 150 |
| Scarlets | Total | 109 | 9 | 97 | 173 | 4 | 770 | 5 | 2 | 5 | 12 | 0 | 56 | 36 | 4 | 28 | 53 | 1 | 238 | 150 | 15 | 130 | 238 | 5 | 1,064 |
| Bath | 2015–16 | 15 | 1 | 7 | 12 | 0 | 55 | 0 | 0 | 0 | 0 | 0 | 0 | 5 | 0 | 0 | 1 | 0 | 3 | 20 | 1 | 7 | 13 | 0 | 58 |
| Bath | 2016–17 | 9 | 0 | 10 | 12 | 0 | 56 | 3 | 0 | 3 | 4 | 0 | 18 | 5 | 1 | 5 | 12 | 0 | 51 | 17 | 1 | 18 | 26 | 0 | 125 |
| Bath | 2017–18 | 15 | 2 | 26 | 26 | 3 | 149 | 1 | 0 | 0 | 0 | 0 | 0 | 4 | 0 | 3 | 11 | 0 | 39 | 20 | 2 | 29 | 37 | 3 | 188 |
| Bath | 2018–19 | 16 | 2 | 16 | 24 | 0 | 114 | 1 | 0 | 5 | 1 | 0 | 13 | 3 | 0 | 3 | 3 | 0 | 15 | 20 | 2 | 24 | 28 | 0 | 142 |
| Bath | 2019–20 | 22 | 0 | 34 | 46 | 0 | 206 | 2 | 1 | 1 | 2 | 0 | 11 | 3 | 1 | 1 | 2 | 0 | 13 | 27 | 2 | 36 | 50 | 0 | 230 |
| Bath | 2020–21 | 16 | 2 | 25 | 30 | 0 | 150 | 0 | 0 | 0 | 0 | 0 | 0 | 0 | 0 | 0 | 0 | 0 | 0 | 16 | 2 | 25 | 30 | 0 | 150 |
| Bath | Total | 93 | 7 | 118 | 150 | 3 | 730 | 7 | 1 | 9 | 7 | 0 | 42 | 20 | 2 | 12 | 29 | 0 | 121 | 120 | 10 | 139 | 186 | 3 | 893 |
| Cardiff Rugby | 2021–22 | 4 | 0 | 5 | 7 | 0 | 31 | 0 | 0 | 0 | 0 | 0 | 0 | 0 | 0 | 0 | 0 | 0 | 0 | 4 | 0 | 5 | 7 | 0 | 31 |
| Career total | | 206 | 16 | 220 | 330 | 7 | 1,531 | 12 | 3 | 14 | 19 | 0 | 98 | 56 | 6 | 40 | 82 | 1 | 359 | 274 | 25 | 274 | 431 | 8 | 1,988 |

Apps = Appearances; T = Tries; C = Conversions; P = Penalties; D = Drop goals; Pts = Total points

== Post-rugby career ==
Priestland is a pundit on the Welsh language free-to-air public broadcast television channel S4C. He is also qualified as a financial advisor.
