= Higgitt =

Higgitt is a surname. Notable people with the surname include:

- John Higgitt (1947–2006), British art historian and epigrapher
- Rob Higgitt (born 1981), Welsh rugby union player
- William Leonard Higgitt (1917–1989), Canadian civil servant
