= Scott Roberts =

Scott Roberts may refer to:

- Scott Roberts (footballer) (born 1996), Scottish footballer
- Scott Roberts (rugby union) (born 1984), rugby union prop forward
- Scott Roberts (voice actor) (born 1978), Canadian voice actor, film actor, and stage actor
- Scott Roberts, director of 2002 Australian crime film The Hard Word
