= 2006–07 Celtic League =

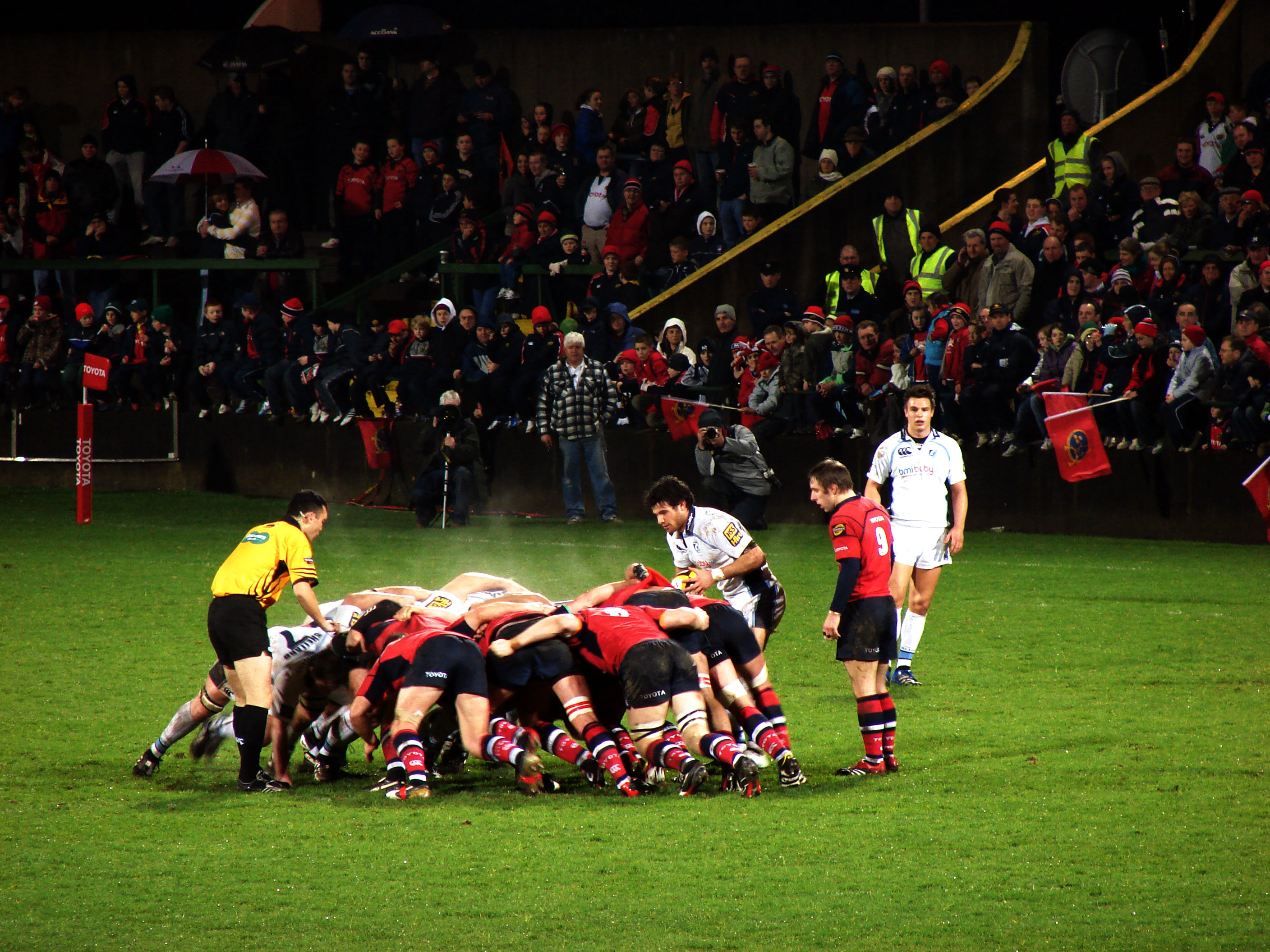
- A scrum between Cardiff Blues and Munster
- Countries: Ireland; Scotland; Wales
- Champions: (Wales) Ospreys (2nd title)
- Runners-up: (Wales) Cardiff Blues
- Matches played: 110
- Attendance: 661,163 (average 6,011 per match)
- Tries scored: 453 (average 4.1 per match)
- Top point scorer: Dan Parks (Glasgow) (197 points)
- Top try scorer: Darren Daniel (Llanelli Scarlets); Barry Davies (Llanelli Scarlets); Jamie Heaslip (Leinster); Andrew Trimble (Ulster) (7 tries)

Official website
- www.rabodirectpro12.com

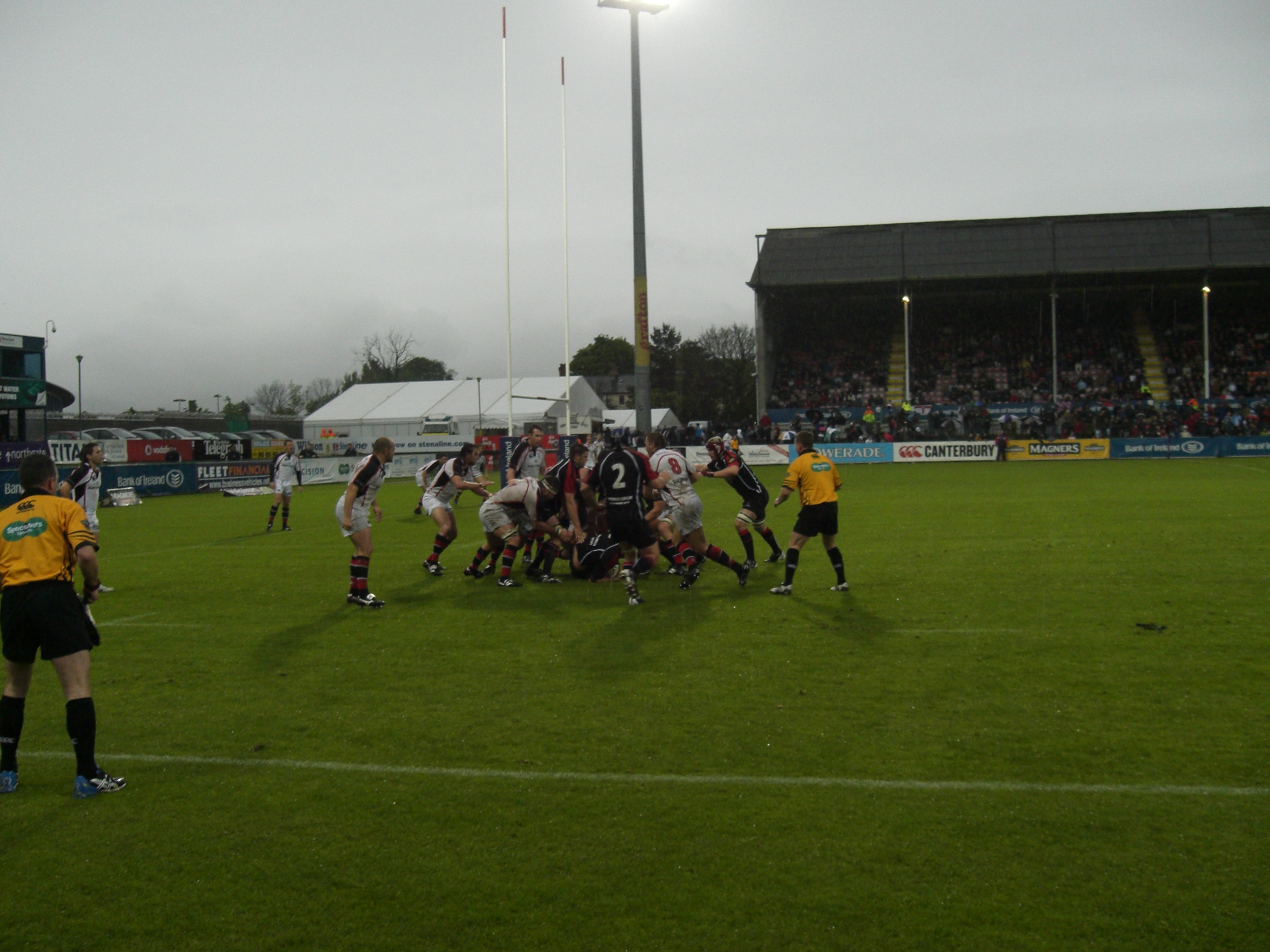
UlstEdinRavenh

The 2006–07 Celtic League (known as the 2006–07 Magners League for sponsorship reasons) was the sixth Celtic League season and the first with Magners as title sponsor. The season commenced on 1 September and was completed on 12 May.

The teams competing remained the same as the previous season with four Irish provinces; Munster, Leinster, Connacht and 2005–06 champions Ulster, three Scottish regions; Edinburgh, Border Reivers and Glasgow Warriors and four Welsh regions; Llanelli Scarlets, Cardiff Blues, Ospreys and Newport Gwent Dragons.

The league was won for the second time in three seasons by the Ospreys, with a final-day win over the Borders, playing their last match, as the Scottish Rugby Union had announced that the Borders would not exist in the following season. Cardiff Blues finished second, making this the only season of the tournament (as of 2021) in which no Irish team made the top two of the United Rugby Championship and predecessor tournaments.

== Teams ==
Location of 2006–07 Celtic League teams in Great Britain and Ireland.
Winners; 2nd–4th place; Other teams.

Team	Stadium	Capacity	City, Area
(Scotland) Border Reivers	Netherdale	6,000	Galashiels, Scotland
(Wales) Cardiff Blues	Cardiff Arms Park	12,500	Cardiff, Wales
(Ireland) Connacht	Galway Sportsgrounds	5,500	Galway, Republic of Ireland
(Scotland) Edinburgh	Murrayfield Stadium	67,144 (Note: Although Murrayfield's full capacity is 67,144, only the lower section of the West Stand, with a capacity of 12,464, is generally opened for Edinburgh fixtures.)	Edinburgh, Scotland
(Scotland) Glasgow Warriors	Hughenden Stadium	6,000	Glasgow, Scotland
(Ireland) Leinster	Donnybrook Stadium (Note: Leinster played two of their games at Lansdowne Road, those against Munster and Ulster. The latter was billed as The Last Stand and was the final match played in Lansdowne Road before its demolition and replacement by the Aviva Stadium.)	6,500	Dublin, Republic of Ireland
(Wales) Llanelli Scarlets	Stradey Park	10,800	Llanelli, Wales
(Ireland) Munster	Thomond Park; Musgrave Park	13,200; 8,300	Limerick, Republic of Ireland; Cork, Republic of Ireland
(Wales) Newport Gwent Dragons	Rodney Parade	12,000	Newport, Wales
(Wales) Ospreys	Liberty Stadium	20,500	Swansea, Wales
(Ireland) Ulster	Ravenhill	12,800	Belfast, Northern Ireland

== Pre-season ==
Ulster began the season as the reigning champions whilst Munster are Heineken Cup champions of the 2005–06 season. Prior to the season commencing it was announced by the Irish Rugby Football Union that some of their internationals were to be rested during part of the season as the Rugby World Cup takes place at the end. This would include the first four matches of the season, to allow for recovery from the June internationals. Those who did not play much during the internationals may return sooner. Major signings during the off-season include Justin Marshall for the Ospreys and Stephen Jones for the Scarlets. The free weekend scheme, where each team that did not compete in a match on a weekend due to the odd number of teams in the league would receive 4 points, was scrapped.

== Table ==
Pos	Team	Pld	W	D	L	PF	PA	PD	TF	TA	TBP	LBP	Pts
1	(Wales) Ospreys	20	14	0	6	461	374	+87	49	32	4	4	64
2	(Wales) Cardiff Blues	20	13	1	6	447	327	+120	53	33	6	3	63
3	(Ireland) Leinster	20	12	1	7	472	376	+96	54	37	7	4	61
4	(Wales) Llanelli Scarlets	20	12	0	8	490	417	+73	61	41	9	0	57
5	(Ireland) Ulster	20	11	1	8	423	310	+113	45	31	4	5	55
6	(Ireland) Munster	20	12	0	8	379	294	+85	37	31	3	3	54
7	(Scotland) Glasgow Warriors	20	11	0	9	434	419	+15	42	49	3	2	49
8	(Scotland) Edinburgh	20	8	1	11	335	423	−88	31	45	2	6	42
9	(Wales) Newport Gwent Dragons	20	8	0	12	353	362	−9	36	43	1	6	39
10	(Ireland) Connacht	20	4	2	14	326	474	−148	30	48	2	4	26
11	(Scotland) Border Reivers	20	2	0	18	201	545	−344	16	64	0	4	12
Under the standard bonus point system, points are awarded as follows: 4 points for a win; 2 points for a draw; 1 bonus point for scoring 4 tries (or more) (Try bonus); 1 bonus point for losing by 7 points (or fewer) (Losing bonus)
Source: RaboDirect PRO12

== Results ==
=== Round 1 ===
1 September 2006
19:10

Cardiff Blues (Wales)	22 – 13	(Ireland) Munster
	Report

Cardiff Arms Park
Attendance: 8,687

1 September 2006
19:30

Border Reivers (Scotland)	15 – 29	(Ireland) Connacht
	Report

Netherdale
Attendance: 1,303

1 September 2006
19:30

Glasgow Warriors (Scotland)	23 – 24	(Wales) Newport Gwent Dragons
	Report

Hughenden
Attendance: 1,653

2 September 2006
17:30

Ospreys (Wales)	17 – 11	(Scotland) Edinburgh
	Report

Liberty Stadium
Attendance: 7,067

2 September 2006
19:30

Ulster (Ireland)	31 – 16	(Wales) Llanelli Scarlets
	Report

Ravenhill
Attendance: 8,265

=== Round 2 ===
8 September 2006
18:30

Connacht (Ireland)	15 – 10	(Wales) Ospreys
	Report

Sportsground
Attendance: 1,587

8 September 2006
19:10

Llanelli Scarlets (Wales)	31 – 17	(Scotland) Glasgow Warriors
	Report

Stradey Park
Attendance: 6,366

8 September 2006
19:30

Edinburgh (Scotland)	20 – 14	(Ireland) Leinster
	Report

Murrayfield
Attendance: 2,479

9 September 2006
17:30

Newport Gwent Dragons (Wales)	25 – 32	(Ireland) Ulster
	Report

Rodney Parade
Attendance: 5,114

9 September 2006
19:30

Munster (Ireland)	9 – 8	(Scotland) Border Reivers
	Report

Thomond Park
Attendance: 6,138

=== Welsh Round 1 ===
- All-Welsh Round 5 matches played early to allow Welsh teams to play in the Anglo-Welsh Cup.

12 September 2006
19:10

Newport Gwent Dragons (Wales)	22 – 23	(Wales) Llanelli Scarlets
	Report

Rodney Parade
Attendance: 5,574

13 September 2006
19:35

Ospreys (Wales)	18 – 16	(Wales) Cardiff Blues
	Report

Liberty Stadium
Attendance: 10,020

=== Round 3 ===
15 September 2006
18:30

Connacht (Ireland)	15 – 37	(Wales) Llanelli Scarlets
	Report

Sportsground
Attendance: 1,765

15 September 2006
19:10

Ospreys (Wales)	30 – 13	(Scotland) Border Reivers
	Report

Liberty Stadium
Attendance: 5,507

15 September 2006
19:30

Edinburgh (Scotland)	20 – 15	(Ireland) Ulster
	Report

Murrayfield
Attendance: 3,129

15 September 2006
19:30

Glasgow Warriors (Scotland)	24 – 13	(Ireland) Munster
	Report

Hughenden
Attendance: 2,295

16 September 2006
19:30

Leinster (Ireland)	16 – 9	(Wales) Cardiff Blues
	Report

Donnybrook
Attendance: 5,200

=== Round 4 ===
22 September 2006
18:30

Connacht (Ireland)	22 – 22	(Scotland) Edinburgh
	Report

Sportsground
Attendance: 1,065

22 September 2006
18:40

Cardiff Blues (Wales)	27 – 9	(Scotland) Glasgow Warriors
	Report

Cardiff Arms Park
Attendance: 6,326

22 September 2006
19:30

Border Reivers (Scotland)	8 – 20	(Wales) Newport Gwent Dragons
	Report

Netherdale
Attendance: 1,088

22 September 2006
19:30

Ulster (Ireland)	43 – 7	(Wales) Ospreys
	Report

Ravenhill
Attendance: 10,804

23 September 2006
17:30

Llanelli Scarlets (Wales)	33 – 21	(Ireland) Leinster
	Report

Stradey Park
Attendance: 6,721

=== Round 5 ===
29 September 2006
18:30

Connacht (Ireland)	16 – 31	(Ireland) Leinster
	Report

Sportsground
Attendance: 3,678

29 September 2006
19:30

Edinburgh (Scotland)	14 – 9	(Scotland) Glasgow Warriors
	Report

Murrayfield
Attendance: 4,342

30 September 2006
19:30

Munster (Ireland)	21 – 13	(Ireland) Ulster
	Report

Musgrave Park
Attendance: 8,000

=== Round 6 ===
6 October 2006
18:30

Connacht (Ireland)	17 – 24	(Ireland) Ulster
	Report

Sportsground
Attendance: 1,687

6 October 2006
19:30

Glasgow Warriors (Scotland)	25 – 0	(Scotland) Border Reivers
	Report

Hughenden
Attendance: 1,967

6 October 2006
19:30

Leinster (Ireland)	27 – 20	(Ireland) Munster
	Report

Lansdowne Road
Attendance: 27,252

=== Round 7 ===
13 October 2006
18:30

Connacht (Ireland)	16 – 9	(Wales) Newport Gwent Dragons
	Report

Sportsground
Attendance: 1,356

13 October 2006
19:10

Ospreys (Wales)	26 – 9	(Scotland) Glasgow Warriors
	Report

Liberty Stadium
Attendance: 6,288

13 October 2006
19:30

Border Reivers (Scotland)	22 – 19	(Ireland) Leinster
	Report

Netherdale
Attendance: 1,661

13 October 2006
19:30

Munster (Ireland)	10 – 21	(Scotland) Edinburgh
	Report

Thomond Park
Attendance: 8,000

14 October 2006
17:30

Ulster (Ireland)	32 – 12	(Wales) Cardiff Blues
	Report

Ravenhill
Attendance: 9,979

=== Round 8 ===
3 November 2006
19:10

Edinburgh (Scotland)	13 – 23	(Wales) Cardiff Blues
	Report

Murrayfield
Attendance: 3,083

3 November 2006
19:30

Glasgow Warriors (Scotland)	39 – 34	(Ireland) Connacht
	Report

Hughenden
Attendance: 1,574

3 November 2006
19:30

Ulster (Ireland)	32 – 8	(Scotland) Border Reivers
	Report

Ravenhill
Attendance: 10,452

4 November 2006
19:30

Leinster (Ireland)	35 – 13	(Wales) Newport Gwent Dragons
	Report

Donnybrook
Attendance: 4,790

5 November 2006
17:30

Llanelli Scarlets (Wales)	25 – 12	(Ireland) Munster
	Report

Stradey Park
Attendance: 5,563

=== Round 9 ===
10 November 2006
19:10

Newport Gwent Dragons (Wales)	17 – 10	(Scotland) Edinburgh
	Report

Rodney Parade
Attendance: 3,846

10 November 2006
19:30

Border Reivers (Scotland)	13 – 19	(Wales) Llanelli Scarlets
	Report

Netherdale
Attendance: 1,103

10 November 2006
19:30

Leinster (Ireland)	38 – 23	(Scotland) Glasgow Warriors
	Report

Donnybrook
Attendance: 3,750

18 November 2006
17:30

Cardiff Blues (Wales)	15 – 13	(Ireland) Connacht
	Report

Cardiff Arms Park
Attendance: 4,309

25 November 2006
19:30

Munster (Ireland)	25 – 20	(Wales) Ospreys
	Report

Thomond Park
Attendance: 6,254

=== Round 10 ===
1 December 2006
19:30

Edinburgh (Scotland)	17 – 3	(Scotland) Border Reivers
	Report

Murrayfield
Attendance: 2,133

2 December 2006
19:30

Ulster (Ireland)	6 – 6	(Ireland) Leinster
	Report

Ravenhill
Attendance: 12,800

3 December 2006
17:00

Munster (Ireland)	13 – 0	(Ireland) Connacht
	Report

Thomond Park
Attendance: 5,300

=== Round 11 ===
22 December 2006
19:30

Glasgow Warriors (Scotland)	34 – 27	(Scotland) Edinburgh
	Report

Hughenden
Attendance: 2,613

23 December 2006
17:30

Cardiff Blues (Wales)	30 – 24	(Wales) Ospreys
	Report

Cardiff Arms Park
Attendance: 11,976

- This match was postponed from Round 6 to allow Welsh teams to play in the Anglo-Welsh Cup.

26 December 2006
16:10

Ospreys (Wales)	50 – 24	(Wales) Llanelli Scarlets
	Report

Liberty Stadium
Attendance: 20,520

26 December 2006
17:30

Ulster (Ireland)	20 – 10	(Ireland) Connacht
	Report

Ravenhill
Attendance: 12,143

27 December 2006
15:00

Munster (Ireland)	25 – 11	(Ireland) Leinster
	Report

Thomond Park
Attendance: 13,200

27 December 2006
15:10

Newport Gwent Dragons (Wales)	14 – 13	(Wales) Cardiff Blues
	Report

Rodney Parade
Attendance: 10,000

=== Round 12 ===
29 December 2006
19:30

Border Reivers (Scotland)	19 – 20	(Scotland) Glasgow Warriors
	Report

Netherdale
Attendance: 1,542

31 December 2006
14:00

Leinster (Ireland)	20 – 12	(Ireland) Ulster
	Report

Lansdowne Road
Attendance: 48,000

31 December 2006
14:10

Ospreys (Wales)	12 – 6	(Wales) Newport Gwent Dragons
	Report

Liberty Stadium
Attendance: 8,304

31 December 2006
16:00

Connacht (Ireland)	8 – 14	(Ireland) Munster
	Report

Sportsground
Attendance: 4,560

1 January 2007
16:10

Cardiff Blues (Wales)	29 – 10	(Wales) Llanelli Scarlets
	Report

Cardiff Arms Park
Attendance: 10,480

=== Round 13 ===
5 January 2007
19:10

Newport Gwent Dragons (Wales)	19 – 12	(Ireland) Munster
	Report

Rodney Parade
Attendance: 5,352

5 January 2007
19:30

Edinburgh (Scotland)	24 – 14	(Wales) Llanelli Scarlets
	Report

Murrayfield
Attendance: 2,137

6 January 2007
17:30

Cardiff Blues (Wales)	36 – 15	(Scotland) Border Reivers
	Report

Cardiff Arms Park
Attendance: 5,169

6 January 2007
17:30

Glasgow Warriors (Scotland)	8 – 19	(Ireland) Ulster
	Report

Hughenden
Attendance: 2,799

6 January 2007
19:30

Leinster (Ireland)	45 – 22	(Wales) Ospreys
	Report

Donnybrook
Attendance: 6,000

=== Round 14 ===
26 January 2007
19:30

Edinburgh (Scotland)	49 – 31	(Ireland) Connacht
	Report

Murrayfield
Attendance: 1,824

26 January 2007
19:30

Glasgow Warriors (Scotland)	22 – 3	(Wales) Cardiff Blues
	Report

Hughenden
Attendance: 1,562

26 January 2007
19:30

Newport Gwent Dragons (Wales)	48 – 0	(Scotland) Border Reivers
	Report

Rodney Parade
Attendance: 4,986

26 January 2007
19:40

Leinster (Ireland)	44 – 34	(Wales) Llanelli Scarlets
	Report

Donnybrook
Attendance: 5,890

27 January 2007
17:30

Ospreys (Wales)	29 – 22	(Ireland) Ulster
	Report

Liberty Stadium
Attendance: 6,077

=== Round 15 ===
16 February 2007
19:10

Ulster (Ireland)	14 – 7	(Wales) Newport Gwent Dragons
	Report

Ravenhill
Attendance: 9,237

16 February 2007
19:30

Border Reivers (Scotland)	0 – 36	(Ireland) Munster
	Report

Netherdale
Attendance: 1,485

16 February 2007
19:30

Glasgow Warriors (Scotland)	30 – 14	(Wales) Llanelli Scarlets
	Report

Hughenden
Attendance: 1,825

16 February 2007
19:30

Leinster (Ireland)	13 – 6	(Scotland) Edinburgh
	Report

Donnybrook
Attendance: 5,340

17 February 2007
17:30

Ospreys (Wales)	31 – 10	(Ireland) Connacht
	Report

Liberty Stadium
Attendance: 6,499

=== Round 16 ===
2 March 2007
18:30

Connacht (Ireland)	20 – 17	(Scotland) Border Reivers
	Report

Sportsground
Attendance: 1,240

2 March 2007
19:30

Edinburgh (Scotland)	12 – 30	(Wales) Ospreys
	Report

Murrayfield
Attendance: 2,335

2 March 2007
19:30

Newport Gwent Dragons (Wales)	13 – 3	(Scotland) Glasgow Warriors
	Report

Rodney Parade
Attendance: 4,656

2 March 2007
19:40

Munster (Ireland)	12 – 19	(Wales) Cardiff Blues
	Report

Musgrave Park
Attendance: 8,000

3 March 2007
17:30

Llanelli Scarlets (Wales)	17 – 11	(Ireland) Ulster
	Report

Stradey Park
Attendance: 5,641

=== Round 17 ===
23 March 2007
19:10

Llanelli Scarlets (Wales)	35 – 11	(Wales) Newport Gwent Dragons
	Report

Stradey Park
Attendance: 6,320

23 March 2007
19:30

Border Reivers (Scotland)	10 – 3	(Scotland) Edinburgh
	Report

Netherdale
Attendance: 1,444

23 March 2007
19:30

Ulster (Ireland)	21 – 24	(Ireland) Munster
	Report

Ravenhill
Attendance: 12,900

24 March 2007
17:15

Leinster (Ireland)	30 – 21	(Ireland) Connacht
	Report

Donnybrook
Attendance: 6,500

=== Round 18 ===
6 April 2007
19:10

Llanelli Scarlets (Wales)	53 – 11	(Scotland) Border Reivers
	Report

Stradey Park
Attendance: 5,437

6 April 2007
19:30

Edinburgh (Scotland)	30 – 20	(Wales) Newport Gwent Dragons
	Report

Murrayfield
Attendance: 2,261

6 April 2007
19:30

Glasgow Warriors (Scotland)	26 – 20	(Ireland) Leinster
	Report

Hughenden
Attendance: 2,121

7 April 2007
17:30

Ospreys (Wales)	20 – 12	(Ireland) Munster
	Report

Liberty Stadium
Attendance: 9,295

7 April 2007
18:30

Connacht (Ireland)	16 – 16	(Wales) Cardiff Blues
	Report

Sportsground
Attendance: 1,536

=== Round 19 ===
13 April 2007
18:30

Connacht (Ireland)	23 – 40	(Scotland) Glasgow Warriors
	Report

Sportsground
Attendance: 1,331

13 April 2007
19:10

Newport Gwent Dragons (Wales)	22 – 23	(Ireland) Leinster
	Report

Rodney Parade
Attendance: 5,442

13 April 2007
19:30

Border Reivers (Scotland)	9 – 33	(Ireland) Ulster
	Report

Netherdale
Attendance: 3,252

14 April 2007
16:10

Cardiff Blues (Wales)	48 – 0	(Scotland) Edinburgh
	Report

Cardiff Arms Park
Attendance: 4,527

14 April 2007
19:30

Munster (Ireland)	20 – 0	(Wales) Llanelli Scarlets
	Report

Musgrave Park
Attendance: 6,500

=== Rescheduled matches ===
- These match were rescheduled to allow Cardiff and Ospreys to play in the Anglo-Welsh Cup semi-finals.

20 April 2007
19:10

Cardiff Blues (Wales)	20 – 17	(Ireland) Ulster
	Report

Cardiff Arms Park
Attendance: 6,354

24 April 2007
19:35

Llanelli Scarlets (Wales)	6 – 19	(Wales) Ospreys
	Report

Stradey Park
Attendance: 10,102

=== Round 20 ===
27 April 2007
19:10

Ospreys (Wales)	19 – 17	(Ireland) Leinster
	Report

Liberty Stadium
Attendance: 10,702

27 April 2007
19:30

Border Reivers (Scotland)	14 – 41	(Wales) Cardiff Blues
	Report

Netherdale
Attendance: 1,238

27 April 2007
19:30

Ulster (Ireland)	10 – 24	(Scotland) Glasgow Warriors
	Report

Ravenhill
Attendance: 8,056

28 April 2007
17:00

Munster (Ireland)	15 – 7	(Wales) Newport Gwent Dragons
	Report

Musgrave Park
Attendance: 4,517

29 April 2007
16:10

Llanelli Scarlets (Wales)	42 – 17	(Scotland) Edinburgh
	Report

Stradey Park
Attendance: 5,108

=== Rescheduled Match ===
- All-Welsh match rescheduled to allow Welsh teams to play in the Anglo-Welsh Cup.

1 May 2007
19:10

Cardiff Blues (Wales)	31 – 20	(Wales) Newport Gwent Dragons
	Report

Cardiff Arms Park
Attendance: 9,326

=== Round 21 ===
4 May 2007
19:10

Newport Gwent Dragons (Wales)	23 – 0	(Ireland) Connacht
	Report

Rodney Parade
Attendance: 4,322

4 May 2007
19:30

Edinburgh (Scotland)	9 – 35	(Ireland) Munster
	Report

Murrayfield
Attendance: 3,129

4 May 2007
19:30

Glasgow Warriors (Scotland)	29 – 26	(Wales) Ospreys
	Report

Hughenden
Attendance: 2,486

5 May 2007
17:30

Llanelli Scarlets (Wales)	38 – 10	(Wales) Cardiff Blues
	Report

Stradey Park
Attendance: 7,506

5 May 2007
19:30

Leinster (Ireland)	31 – 0	(Scotland) Border Reivers
	Report

Donnybrook
Attendance: 6,200

=== Rescheduled Match ===
- All-Welsh match rescheduled to allow Welsh teams to play in the Anglo-Welsh Cup.

8 May 2007
19:35

Newport Gwent Dragons (Wales)	13 – 27	(Wales) Ospreys
	Report

Rodney Parade
Attendance: 6,438

=== Round 22 ===
11 May 2007
19:10

Cardiff Blues (Wales)	27 – 11	(Ireland) Leinster
	Report

Cardiff Arms Park
Attendance: 10,320

11 May 2007
19:10

Llanelli Scarlets (Wales)	19 – 10	(Ireland) Connacht
	Report

Stradey Park
Attendance: 5,204

11 May 2007
19:30

Ulster (Ireland)	16 – 10	(Scotland) Edinburgh
	Report

Ravenhill
Attendance: 7,429

12 May 2007
17:30

Border Reivers (Scotland)	16 – 24	(Wales) Ospreys
	Report

Netherdale
Attendance: 1,837

12 May 2007
17:30

Munster (Ireland)	38 – 20	(Scotland) Glasgow Warriors
	Report

Musgrave Park
Attendance: 3,311

== Leading scorers ==
Note: Flags to the left of player names indicate national team as has been defined under IRB eligibility rules, or primary nationality for players who have not yet earned international senior caps. Players may hold one or more non-IRB nationalities.

=== Top points scorers ===
Rank	Player	Club	Points
1	(Scotland) Dan Parks	(Scotland) Glasgow Warriors	197
2	(Argentina) Felipe Contepomi	(Ireland) Leinster	187
3	(New Zealand) Ben Blair	(Wales) Cardiff Blues	160
4	(Ireland) David Humphreys	(Ireland) Ulster	148
5	(Wales) Ceri Sweeney	(Wales) Newport Gwent Dragons	137

=== Top try scorers ===
Rank	Player	Club	Tries
1	(Wales) Darren Daniel	(Wales) Llanelli Scarlets	7
1	(Wales) Barry Davies	(Wales) Llanelli Scarlets	7
1	(Ireland) Jamie Heaslip	(Ireland) Leinster	7
1	(Ireland) Andrew Trimble	(Ireland) Ulster	7
5	(Ireland) Denis Hickie	(Ireland) Leinster	6

== Broadcast rights ==
Television rights for the league are split between three broadcasters, BBC Wales, S4C and Setanta Sports. At the start of the season it was announced that the BBC Wales and S4C had extended their contract to show Celtic League until the end of the 2009/10 season.
