= Martin Roberts (rugby union, born 1986) =

Wales international rugby union player (born 1986)

- Born: 6 June 1986 (age 40) Aberdare, Wales
- Height: 1.75 m (5 ft 9 in)
- Weight: 81 kg (12 st 11 lb)
- School: Neath College

Rugby union career
- Position: Scrum-half
- Current team: Exeter Chiefs (loan)
Senior career
Years	Team	Apps	(Points)
2004–2008	Neath	23	(23)
2005–2008	Ospreys	22	(5)
2007	Swansea	7	(15)
2008	Bridgend	1	(0)
2008–2011	Scarlets	72	(35)
2011	Llanelli	1	(0)
2011–2013	Northampton Saints	59	(10)
2013–2014	Bath	22	(5)
2014–2016	Ospreys	26	(10)
2016–2017	Bristol	12	(10)
- Correct as of 02:36, 2 December 2013 (UTC)
International career
Years	Team	Apps	(Points)
	Wales Schools	?	(?)
	Wales U16	?	(?)
	Wales U19	?	(?)
	Wales U21	?	(?)
2007	Wales Sevens	?	(?)
2008–2009	Wales	3	(0)
- Correct as of 02:36, 2 December 2013 (UTC)

Martin Roberts (born 6 June 1986) is a Wales international rugby union footballer who plays as a scrum-half.

Born in Aberdare, Roberts began his professional career with Neath RFC, before graduating to the Ospreys regional team, and during his time there would play infrequently for Neath, as well as the Ospreys' other Welsh Premier Division feeder clubs, Swansea and Bridgend. One of Roberts' teammates at the Ospreys was fly-half James Hook, with whom he formed an effective half back partnership, after the pair had done the same at both Neath College and Neath RFC.

After three years with the Ospreys, Roberts signed for their regional rivals, the Scarlets, on 27 March 2008, following the departure of former Scarlets scrum-half Dwayne Peel to Sale Sharks. He signed a two-year contract with the Llanelli region, where he would compete with Sililo Martens, Lee Williams and Gavin Cattle for the number 9 jersey.

Roberts has represented Wales internationally at every level from schools through to full international. In 2007, Roberts was selected for the Wales Sevens team.

Roberts was selected for the Wales senior squad for the Autumn international series in October 2008. After Premier Rugby refused to release Peel and Gloucester scrum-half Gareth Cooper for Wales' final Autumn test against Australia, coach Warren Gatland gave Roberts his international debut with a start against Canada on 14 November in an effort to give him a level of international experience ahead of the Australia game.

Roberts made two more appearances for Wales in the 2009 Autumn tests, first coming on for Cooper after 54 minutes of the New Zealand game on 7 November, before replacing Peel for the final eight minutes of the Australia match three weeks later. On 18 January 2010, he was named in the 35-man Wales squad for the 2010 Six Nations Championship.

On 18 March 2011, it was announced that Roberts would join Northampton Saints at the end of the 2010–11 season. Roberts parted company with Northampton Saints at the end of the 2012–13 season and joined Bath Rugby, after the Saints signed scrum-half Kahn Fotuali'i from Roberts' former team, the Ospreys. On 11 July 2014, Roberts re-signed with the Ospreys from the 2014–15 season. In January 2016, Roberts was granted early release from his contract with the Ospreys to join RFU Championship club Bristol on an 18-month deal until the end of the 2016–17 season.
