= John Higgitt =

British art historian and epigrapher

Academic background
- Education: The Courtauld Institute of Art, University of Oxford

Academic work
- Discipline: History of Art
- Sub-discipline: Medieval Art

John Higgitt (1947 – 2006) was a British art historian and epigrapher. He was born in London on 2 December 1947. The birth was registered in the Hampstead District Offices. He died on the 27th December 2006 in Edinburgh.

== Biography ==
Higgitt graduated from Oriel College, University of Oxford (B.A Hons.1969), and the Courtauld Institute of Art (M.A., 1972). In 1974 he secured a teaching post at the University of Edinburgh and continued there until his death in 2006. He specialized in research and teaching of the later medieval period with a particular interest in English and Parisian book paintings including Books of Hours. His biographer for Grove Art Online, Debra Higgs Strickland, suggests that his scholarship in this area might best be exemplified by the monograph The Murthly Hours: Devotion, Literacy and Luxury in Paris, London and the Gaelic West.

Higgitt served on the Ancient Monuments Board for Scotland and the board of Historic Scotland. He was also the chair of the National Committee on the Carved Stones of Scotland, an organisation he helped to found.

In an obituary written soon after his death in the Scotsman, John Higgitt was described as "an ornament to his profession and the University of Edinburgh". His contribution to the research and teaching of the History of Art in the city was recognised when a new Gallery and History of Art staff offices were named in his honour at the Edinburgh College of Arts in 2015.

Photographs attributed to Higgitt appear in the Conway Library at the Courtauld Institute of Art, London.

== Selected bibliography ==
- Early Medieval Sculpture in Britain and Ireland, 1986, Oxford, Oxford University Press
- (Ed) Medieval Art and Architecture in the Diocese of St. Andrews, 1994, London, British Archaeological Association
- The Murthly Hours: Devotion, Literacy and Luxury in Paris, England and the Gaelic West, 2000, London, British Library and University of Toronto Press in association with the National Library of Scotland, 2000
- (Ed) Corpus of British Medieval Library Catalogues. 12. Scottish Libraries, British Library. British Academy, London: British Library in association with the British Academy, 2006
- Rothwell Cross, Oxford University Press, Grove Art Online, 2003
