= Darren Daniel =

Welsh rugby union player (born 1986)

- Born: Darren Daniel; 13 September 1986 (age 40) Burry Port, Wales
- Height: 1.83 m (6 ft 0 in)
- Weight: 97 kg (15 st 4 lb)

Rugby union career
- Position: Wing
Senior career
| Years | Team | Apps | (Points) |
| 2004–2010 | Llanelli RFC | 32 | (85) |
| 2005–2010 | Scarlets | 55 | (90) |
| 2009–2011 | Carmarthen Quins RFC | 14 | (40) |
| 2010–2011 | London Irish | | |
| 2011–2012 | Cornish Pirates | 2 | (5) |
| 2012–2014 | Carmarthen Quins RFC | 21 | (15) |
- Correct as of 7 May 2023
International career
| Years | Team | Apps | (Points) |
- Wales U16
| – | Wales U18 | | |
| – | Wales U19 | | |
| – | Wales U21s | | |
National sevens team
| Years | Team | | Comps |
| 2009 | Wales | | |

Darren Daniel (born 13 September 1986) is a Welsh rugby union footballer.

Daniel began his career with Llanelli RFC, working his way up through the junior and youth teams, before finally reaching the senior squad. By the time he was 18, Daniel was a regular in the Llanelli first team, and it wasn't long before he was promoted to the Scarlets regional side. He made his debut for the Scarlets on 20 August 2005 in a friendly match against the Worcester Warriors, but didn't score his first try until the following match, another friendly against a Scarlets Regional Select XV four days later.

Daniel spent most of the 2005–06 season playing for Llanelli in the Principality Premiership, but also played five matches for the Scarlets, scoring one try. In the 2006–07 Magners League, however, Daniel became much more of a fixture in the Scarlets squad, playing 21 matches and scoring 10 tries, including a hat–trick in the win over the Glasgow Warriors. Nathan Brew's arrival at the West Wales club made it more difficult for Daniel to hold down a spot in the Scarlets' starting XV in the 2007–08 Magners League, but Mark Jones' absence at the 2007 Rugby World Cup provided him with a chance to prove himself before the competition for places intensified.

Daniel joined Wales Sevens for the 2009–10 IRB Sevens World Series.

In July 2010, Daniel was released by the Scarlets, and soon signed with the Carmarthen Quins. He later joined London Irish playing for the A side. and in 2011 joined the Cornish Pirates where he stayed for one season starting two games. While with the Pirates, Daniel played for Launceston Rugby Club on loan.

In 2012, Daniel returned to the Quins, where he played until 2014.
