= Matthew Jacobs (rugby union) =

English rugby union player

- Born: 23 February 1985 (age 41) Oxford, England
- Height: 1.86 m (6 ft 1 in)
- Weight: 87 kg (13 st 10 lb)

Rugby union career
- Position: Wing
Senior career
Years	Team	Apps	(Points)
2004–2005	Llandovery RFC	1	(0)
2005–2009	Llanelli RFC	65	(90)
2005–2009	Scarlets	4	(5)
2009–2016	Llandovery RFC	184	(230)
2014	Carmarthen Quins RFC	1	(0)
2016–2017	Aberavon RFC	6	(0)

Matthew Jacobs (born 23 February 1985) is a former rugby union player who began his career as a wing, before later playing as a centre.

Born in Oxford, England, Jacobs was educated at Tregib Comprehensive School in Llandeilo, Carmarthenshire, and began his rugby career with Llandeilo RFC, as well as having a stint with Llangennech RFC. In 2004, he made an appearance for Llandovery RFC, and in 2005, he joined Llanelli RFC, where he became part of the Scarlets regional setup. He made his debut for the Scarlets in November 2008, starting on the left wing in an Anglo-Welsh Cup game against Northampton Saints. He made his Celtic League debut a few weeks later, this time playing on the right wing against Munster. In January 2009, he played for the Scarlets in a match against the Barbarians to mark the official opening of their new stadium, Parc y Scarlets; he opened the scoring with a try in the third minute as the Scarlets went on to win 40–24. His next appearance for the Scarlets, against Leinster three weeks later, also turned out to be his last. In April 2009, he returned to playing for Llandovery, where he played for the next seven seasons, albeit making a single appearance for Carmarthen Quins in a British and Irish Cup game against Leinster A in November 2014. In February 2013, he was named as the Principality Premiership Player of the Month for January. In 2016, he moved to Aberavon RFC, where he played six games during the 2016–17 season.

Jacobs is also a personal trainer.
