= Alec Jenkins =

Welsh rugby player

- Born: Alec Jenkins; 7 July 1987 (age 39) Wales
- Height: 6 ft 2 in (1.88 m)
- Weight: 87 kg (13 st 10 lb)

Rugby union career
- Position: Wing
Senior career
Years	Team	Apps	(Points)
- Pontyberem RFC
- Carmarthen Quins
2005–2008	Llanelli RFC		
2009–	Neath RFC	0	(0)
- Correct as of 19:45, 11 February 2008 (UTC)
Provincial / State sides
Years	Team	Apps	(Points)
2005–2008	Llanelli Scarlets		
2008–2009	London Welsh RFC		
- Correct as of 19:45, 11 February 2008 (UTC)
International career
Years	Team	Apps	(Points)
2005	Wales U18		
2006	Wales U19		
2007	Wales U20	5	(5)
- Correct as of 19:45, 11 February 2008 (UTC)
National sevens team
Years	Team		Comps
2006–	Wales Sevens		
- Correct as of 19:45, 11 February 2008 (UTC)

Alec Jenkins (born 7 July 1987 in Wales) is a Welsh rugby union player who plays on the wing for Llanelli Scarlets and Wales Sevens.

When not playing for the Scarlets, Jenkins plays domestic rugby with Llanelli RFC. Jenkins' former clubs include Pontyberem RFC and Carmarthen Quins. He has previously represented the Wales Sevens team and was part of the squad that won the Hong Kong Sevens Plate in April 2006. He has further representative honours for Wales at U18 & U19 levels.

In February 2007, Jenkins was included in the Wales U20 squad ahead of the U21 Six Nations championship. He appeared in every game of the tournament and scored a try in the 56–8 victory over Scotland.

Jenkins was called up for the Wales Sevens squad for the 2006–07 season, for the fifth and six legs of the IRB Sevens World Series in Hong Kong and Adelaide. He scored a try in the Plate final in Hong Kong against Argentina; the Welsh lifted the trophy courtesy of the 26–19 scoreline.

In January 2008, Jenkins was included in the Wales Sevens squad for the Wellington, New Zealand, and San Diego, USA, legs of the 2007–2008 IRB Sevens World Series.

On 14 May 2008 it was announced that Jenkins would be leaving the Scarlets to join London Welsh. On 1 July 2009 it was announced that Jenkins was returning to Wales to play for semi-professional side Neath RFC.
