= Aled Brew =

Welsh rugby union player

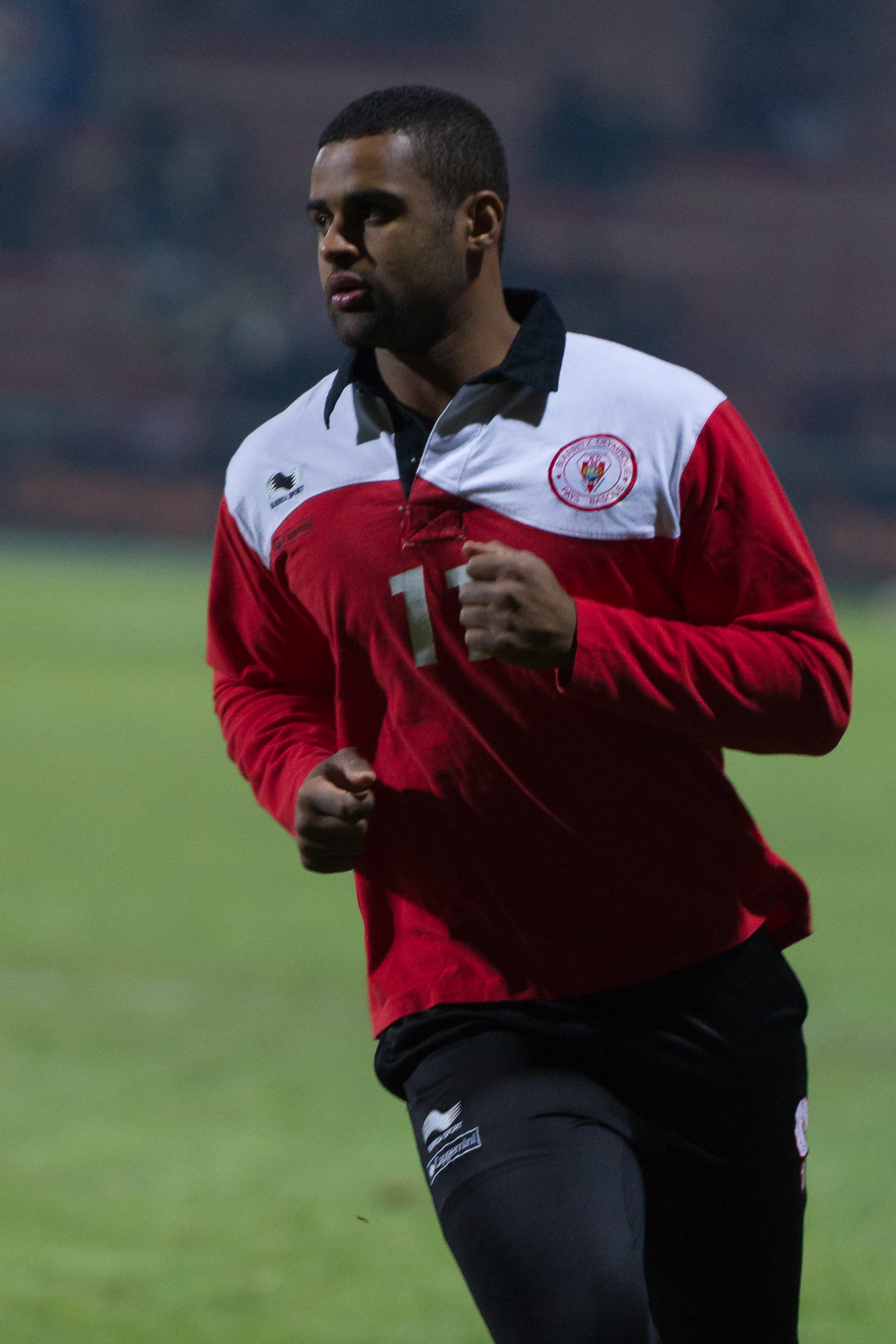
- Aled Brew in January 2013
- Born: Aled Brew; 9 August 1986 (age 40) Cardiff, Wales
- Height: 183 cm (6 ft 0 in)
- Weight: 101 kg (15 st 13 lb; 223 lb)
- Notable relative: Nathan Brew (brother)

Rugby union career
- Position: Winger
Senior career
Years	Team	Apps	(Points)
2004–2006	Neath	6	(5)
2004–2008	Ospreys	24	(15)
2006–2007	→Newport Gwent Dragons	28	(65)
2007–2008	→Aberavon	1	(0)
2008	→Swansea	1	(0)
2008–2009	Cardiff Blues	6	(5)
2008	→Pontypridd	5	
2009–2012	Newport Gwent Dragons	80	(150)
2012–2014	Biarritz Olympique	57	(65)
2014–2016	Newport Gwent Dragons	12	(0)
2016–2020	Bath	53	(75)
2020	Scarlets	1	(0)
- Correct as of 7 November 2022
International career
Years	Team	Apps	(Points)
2007–2012	Wales	9	(15)
- Correct as of 2 Jun 2012
Medal record
Men's rugby sevens
Representing Wales
Rugby World Cup Sevens
Gold medal – first place	2009 Dubai	Team competition

Aled Brew (born 9 August 1986) is a former Wales international rugby union player who played as a winger. He made his debut for the Wales national rugby union team against Ireland in the 2007 Six Nations Championship. In his career, as well as playing for Biarritz Olympique and Bath Rugby, he is one of only a handful of players to have played for all four top-level regional teams in Wales.

== Early life ==
Brew was born in Cardiff to a Welsh mother and Ghanaian father, and was raised a Welsh language speaker in Gwaun-Cae-Gurwen. His older brother Nathan also played rugby union professionally.

== Club career ==
Having started his semi-professional career with stints at Neath and Swansea RFC, Brew joined the Ospreys at 17 years old. He was sent out on loan to the Newport Gwent Dragons for the 2006/7 season, for whom he scored 65 points in 28 appearances, scoring 13 tries. Playing alongside his brother, Brew was the victim of alleged racial abuse from fans on 16 February 2007, while playing against Ulster Rugby in Ulster. Ulster Rugby however were subsequently cleared of any wrongdoing and the abuse was not proven. Returning to the Ospreys for the 2007/8 season, he found competition hard against the in-form Shane Williams, despite having already played international rugby for Wales by that point, and spent much time in the second team.

Brew signed for Cardiff Blues in May 2008, however he made just one appearance in the 2008/9 Celtic League season and was loaned to Pontypridd RFC and Newport Gwent Dragons later in the season. The following season, Brew returned to Dragons.

In February 2012, after initially having discussions with Perpignan, Brew signed for French club Biarritz Olympique for the 2012/13 season.

Brew re-joined the Newport Gwent Dragons in 2014, and after two seasons he left the Dragons on a short-term contract at English side Bath in the Aviva Premiership. In December 2016, Brew signed permanent deal with Bath until the end of the 2017–18 season., however her went on to spend four seasons with the club. Following this, Brew joined the Scarlets in September 2020 as short-term injury cover, but played just one match before announcing his retirement in December 2020. At the time of his retirement, he held the Dragons' try-scoring record with 43.

== International career ==
Brew represented Wales at Under-16, Under-U18 and Under-21 levels, as well as playing for the Wales Sevens team. He was called into the Wales national senior squad for the 2007 Six Nations Championship, making his senior debut as a replacement in the match against Ireland. Brew was also named as part of Gareth Jenkins's squad for the two-Test tour of Australia in May 2007 and gained his second cap in the second Test defeat in Brisbane. Brew was named in Jenkins's 41-man preliminary 2007 Rugby World Cup summer training squad in the June, but failed to make the final cut for the tournament.

Brew has represented Wales Sevens in the first two stages of the 2007–2008 IRB Sevens World Series, in Dubai and George, South Africa, where the team won the Bowl trophy in the latter leg. Brew was part of the Wales Sevens team that won the Melrose Cup at the 2009 Rugby World Cup Sevens.

In November 2010, Brew was recalled to the Wales national squad for the Autumn International series and was selected in the starting line-up against Fiji. He scored his first international try versus the Barbarians on 4 June 2011.

In August 2011 Brew was named in the Wales squad for the 2011 Rugby World Cup in New Zealand.

=== International tries ===
Try	Opponent	Location	Venue	Competition	Date	Result
1	Barbarian F.C.	Cardiff, Wales	Millennium Stadium	2011 June rugby union tests	4 June 2011	Loss
2	Namibia	New Plymouth, New Zealand	Yarrow Stadium	2011 Rugby World Cup	26 September 2011	Win
3	Barbarian F.C.	Cardiff, Wales	Millennium Stadium	2012 June rugby union tests	2 June 2012	Win
