= Rhys Lawrence =

English rugby union player for Dunvant RFC Athletic footballer

- Born: 4 June 1988 (age 38) Hillingdon, Greater London, England
- Height: 1.78 m (5 ft 10 in)
- Weight: 100 kg (220 lb; 15 st 10 lb)
- University: Swansea University

Rugby union career
- Position: Hooker
Senior career
| Years | Team | Apps | (Points) |
| 2008–2011 | Llanelli RFC | 50 | (10) |
| 2011–2015 | Bristol Rugby | 63 | (6) |
| 2015–2018 | Ealing Trailfinders | 46 | (7) |
Provincial / State sides
| Years | Team | Apps | (Points) |
| 2009–2011 | Scarlets | 10 | (0) |
| 2018–2020 | Dragons | 2 | (0) |

Rhys Lawrence (born 4 June 1988) is a rugby union Hooker, current plays for Dunvant RFC Athletic.

Lawrence was born in Hillingdon, England and then brought up in Swansea, Wales. He played rugby first for Dunvant RFC under-13s.

Lawrence went to Olchfa Comprehensive School in Swansea before studying at Swansea University.

In 2008, Lawrence attained 6 Welsh U20 caps. He was Man of the Match against Ireland in Dubarry Park Athlone during 6 Nations. He appeared in first U20's world championship in 2008 hosted in Wales. He also appeared in three pool games but injured MCL in a game against France. He played for Llanelli RFC, Scarlets and Bristol Rugby.

On 6 May 2015, Lawrence signs for newly promoted side Ealing Trailfinders in the RFU Championship from the 2015–16 season.

Lawrence joined the Dragons for the 2018–19 season, making his senior team debut on 13 October 2018 as a replacement against Timișoara Saracens in the European Rugby Challenge Cup. He was released by the Dragons at the end of the 2019–20 season.
