= Gavin Evans =

Wales international rugby union footballer

- Born: Gavin Dean Evans; 18 July 1984 (age 42) Swansea, Wales
- Height: 191 cm (6 ft 3 in)
- Weight: 100 kg (15 st 10 lb)
- School: Ysgol y Strade

Rugby union career
- Position: Centre
Senior career
Years	Team	Apps	(Points)
2003–2006	Llanelli RFC	44	(53)
2003–2009	Scarlets	78	(78)
2009–2016	Cardiff Blues	126	(35)
2010–2016	Cardiff RFC	2	(0)
2016–2019	Neath RFC		
International career
Years	Team	Apps	(Points)
2006	Wales	1	(0)

Gavin Dean Evans (born 18 July 1984) is a Welsh former professional rugby union player who played as a centre. Born in Swansea, he began his career with Llanelli RFC and played for the Scarlets regional side from 2003 to 2009, when he moved to the Cardiff Blues. In 2016, he left Cardiff and signed for Neath RFC in the Welsh Premiership. After playing for Wales at under-16, under-18 and under-19 levels, he was part of the Wales Under-21 team that won the Under-21 Six Nations in 2005, before being capped by the senior team in 2006.

== Club career ==
After starting off at Llanelli, Evans made his debut for the Scarlets in a friendly against Slovenia in August 2003, a match the Scarlets won 95–0. He also played against Llandovery a week later, and he scored his first try as Scarlets won 48–7. However, he would have to wait until February 2006 to make his first competitive appearance for the region, coming off the bench in a loss to Connacht. He made four more appearances that season, three as a starter. In 2006–07, was a regular starter for the Scarlets, making 30 appearances in total, and in July 2007, he signed a three-year contract extension with the region. His involvement diminished over the next two seasons, playing 23 times in 2007–08 and 18 times in 2008–09, and in March 2009, he agreed to join the Cardiff Blues as a replacement for the departing Jamie Robinson.

His competitive debut for the Blues, like his Scarlets debut, was against Connacht. After signing a two-year contract extension in 2012, he was named vice-captain in 2013, and signed another two-year contract extension in 2014. On 13 December 2014, Evans made his 100th appearance for the Blues in the match against London Irish.

After departing the Cardiff Blues, Evans joined Neath RFC.

== International career ==
Evans was a Wales international at under-16, under-18 and under-19 levels before making his first start for the under-21s in an Under-21 Six Nations match against England in March 2004. A week later, he scored the opening try in Wales' 49–17 win over Italy. In June 2004, he was named in a 26-man squad for the 2004 Under 21 Rugby World Championship in Scotland. He scored the opening try in a 46–11 win over Russia in their first game of the tournament. He then played in the 27–26 defeat to South Africa in the second match, before being left out of the final group match against England, which finished in a 23–14 defeat. Wales then met France in the fifth-place play-off semi-final, winning 29–21 as Evans returned to the team, before losing 26–19 to England again in the fifth-place final.

After playing in Wales' 32–21 win over England in their opening match of the Under-21 Six Nations in 2005, Evans was left out of the squad for the 40–3 win over Italy the following week, before being recalled for their match against France. He played again in the 31–7 win over Scotland, before being left out for the Grand Slam win over Ireland.

In 2006, Evans was called up to the Wales senior squad for the autumn Test series, the only uncapped player in the 32-man group. He was named on the bench for the second match of the series against the Pacific Islands on 11 November, coming on for Lee Byrne for the final 20 minutes of a 38–20 win.

A shoulder injury meant Evans was not considered for Wales' summer tour to Australia in 2007, but the injury did not require surgery and he was included in the 41-man extended training squad for the 2007 Rugby World Cup; however, he was not included in the final 30-man squad.
