= Johnathan Edwards =

Welsh rugby player (born 1984)

- Born: Johnathan Edwards; 1 September 1984 (age 42) Pontypridd, Wales
- Height: 183 cm (6 ft 0 in)
- Weight: 102 kg (16 st 1 lb)

Rugby union career
- Position: Openside Flanker
- Current team: Cardiff RFC
Senior career
Years	Team	Apps	(Points)
2004-05	Cardiff RFC	22	(20)
2005-08	Llanelli RFC	56	(80)
2008-10	Carmarthen Quins	16	(30)
2013-	Cardiff RFC	60	(61)
- Correct as of 17 March 2016
Provincial / State sides
Years	Team	Apps	(Points)
2005-13	Scarlets	119	(60)
- Correct as of 17 March 2016
- Correct as of 17 March 2016
National sevens team
Years	Team		Comps
- Wales Sevens

Johnathan Edwards (born 5 July 1984) is a Welsh rugby union footballer. He currently plays his club rugby as a flanker for the Cardiff Rugby Club. In 2007, Edwards was selected as captain of the Wales Sevens squad.

== Club Career ==
Edwards joined the Pontypridd RFC Academy in 2001, where his performances as a hard hitting openside flanker with a phenomenal workrate earned him a call up to the ranks of the Wales under 19 FIRA squad. Whilst employed as an Assistant Rugby Development Officer with the Buy As You View Schools Initiative, covering the Merthyr area, Edwards was drafted into the Pontypridd senior squad for the 2003/2004 campaign. Edwards joined the Scarlets in 2005 from Cardiff RFC, and made two appearances in the Celtic League for the Scarlets in the 2005–06 season. Edwards plays rugby for Llanelli RFC when not on duty for the Scarlets.

== International Career ==
Edwards has represented Wales Sevens and was part of the side that won the Dubai Sevens Bowl competition final in 2005. Edwards went to the 2006 Commonwealth Games in Melbourne and was part of the squad that won the Plate Final securing a late victory against South Africa.

In March 2007, Edwards was announced as Wales Sevens Captain for the tour to Hong Kong and Adelaide in the fifth and sixth legs of the 2006–07 IRB World Sevens Series. He led by example in the Bowl final against Tonga in Adelaide as he notched a try in his team's 26–14 victory, and also scored a try in the Plate semi-final against the USA in the Hong Kong leg.

Edwards also captained the Sevens squad in the England and Scotland legs; he scored a brace of tries in the superb win over England at Twickenham, leading his team to a first Welsh win at the home of English rugby since 1988.

Edwards retained the Wales Sevens captaincy ahead of the 2007–08 IRB Sevens World Series. He led his team into the initial leg in Dubai, scoring a try in the Bowl semi-final against Australia, which Wales eventually narrowly lost. However, he captained his side to a Bowl trophy win in the George, South Africa Sevens – the first piece of silverware Wales Sevens gained in the 2007–08 season.
