= Nathan Brew =

Wales international rugby union player

- Born: Nathan Brew; 21 April 1982 (age 44) Cardiff, Wales
- Height: 1.83 m (6 ft 0 in)
- Weight: 94 kg (14 st 11 lb)
- Notable relative: Aled Brew (brother)

Rugby union career
- Position(s): Wing, centre
Senior career
Years	Team	Apps	(Points)
2001–03	Newport	15	(10)
2008–09	Bristol	7	(0)
2009–10	Neath	0	(0)
- Correct as of 10:55, 19 December 2008 (UTC)
Provincial / State sides
Years	Team	Apps	(Points)
2003–07	Dragons	72	(73)
2007–08	Scarlets	10	(5)
2010–11	Dragons	3	(0)
- Correct as of 5 June 2011 (UTC)
International career
Years	Team	Apps	(Points)
- Wales U19
- Wales U21
2003	Wales	1	(5)
- Correct as of 23:36, 14 August 2007 (UTC)
National sevens team
Years	Team		Comps
- Wales
- Correct as of 23:36, 14 August 2007 (UTC)

Nathan Brew (born 21 April 1982) is a former Welsh international rugby union player. Brew played in the centre and on the wing.

== Early life ==
Brew was born in Cardiff to a Welsh mother and Ghanaian father, and was raised a Welsh language speaker in Gwaun-Cae-Gurwen.

== Club career ==
=== Newport RFC ===
Brew began his professional rugby career at Newport RFC, signing for the Black and Ambers when he was still only 19. He made his debut for the Rodney Parade club in a Celtic League match at home to Edinburgh on 1 September 2001. He had to wait nearly six months, however, to score his first try for the club, eventually crossing in a WRU Challenge Cup match against Bonymaen RFC. Brew was then not selected and did not play again for Newport for almost a year. He made his comeback appearance on 8 February 2003 against Bedwas RFC, again in the WRU Challenge Cup, and followed this up by scoring a try in a Welsh Premier Division match against Cardiff RFC on 25 April.

=== Newport Gwent Dragons ===
Before the start of the 2003–04 season, regional rugby was introduced to Wales, and Brew made the move to the Newport Gwent Dragons regional side. He was selected for the Dragons' first match in the revamped Celtic League, an away match against the Llanelli Scarlets. Brew made 25 appearances in all competitions in the 2003–04 season, scoring three tries along the way. However, these three tries did not come until the last three games of the season, which perhaps was a reflection on the brand of rugby the squad played. The 2004–05 season was slightly hit and miss, with Brew only making 17 appearances and scoring just two tries before an injury to his groin (which seemed to be pretty common amongst the Welsh squad during this period with such players as Shane Williams and Barry Davies having similar operations) in March which ruled him out for the rest of the season. Brew returned to the Dragons side just before Christmas 2005 in good form; he scored four tries in the 12 appearances he made that season and earned himself a late call-up to the Welsh squad for their tour of Argentina.

After being deployed mainly as a winger for the majority of his Dragons career, Brew moved into the centre for most of the 2006–07 season where he demonstrated perhaps that this was his best position. It was his ability to create space from the centre that helped Brew score all of his five tries that season, as well as landing one drop goal in an EDF Energy Cup match against the Northampton Saints. An ankle injury kept Brew out of the Dragons team for four months from December 2006 to March 2007.

=== Scarlets ===
In February 2007, it was announced that Brew had signed a two-year contract with the Llanelli Scarlets for the 2007–08 season. The transfer came as a surprise to many Welsh rugby and Dragons fans, due to Brew being a real crowd pleaser at Rodney Parade. Brew made 12 starts for the Scarlets in his time at Stradey Park, before his contract was terminated by mutual agreement on 5 December 2008. Which was partially due to lack of game time opportunities created as a result of the tremendous form of Regan King.

=== Bristol ===
On 18 December 2008, Brew signed for English Premiership side Bristol. He had a spell with Bristol earlier in his career, before he signed for Newport in 2001.

=== Newport Gwent Dragons ===
In August 2010, Brew rejoined the Newport Gwent Dragons on a one-year contract. He was released by Newport Gwent Dragons at the end of the 2010–11 season.

== International career ==
Brew made one appearance for the Welsh national team, making a try-scoring debut in an Autumn Test against Romania at the Racecourse Ground in Wrexham. He has been a part of two Welsh tours the first being in 2004 to South Africa and the second to Argentina whereby he was selection on the bench for the second Test.

Brew played for the Welsh national team at a number of different levels, beginning his international career with the Welsh Senior Schools side, before moving on to the Under-19 and Under-21 sides. Since then, Brew has been involved with the Welsh Sevens team.

== Personal life ==
Brew's brother Aled also played rugby union professionally, and while Aled was on loan at the Newport Gwent Dragons during the 2006–07 season and played alongside his brother several times.

Brew used to own a stonegrill restaurant in Swansea called Papa Sanchos. He has worked in various business roles including Head of Commercial at the Scarlets. He currently works as Vice President of Sales at EHS software provider EcoOnline.
