= Deacon Manu =

New Zealand-born Fijian rugby player (born 1979)

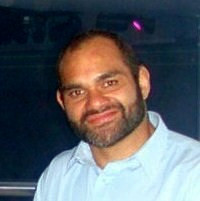
- Born: Deacon Tehanakore Manu; 18 February 1979 (age 47) New Plymouth, New Zealand
- Height: 1.84 m (6 ft 0 in)
- Weight: 118 kg (18 st 8 lb)

Rugby union career
- Position: Prop
- Current team: Retired
Senior career
Years	Team	Apps	(Points)
1999–2006	Waikato	66	(40)
2001–2006	Waikato Chiefs	56	(5)
2003	→Blues	9	(0)
2006–2014	Scarlets	154	(50)
International career
Years	Team	Apps	(Points)
2005	NZ Māori	3	(0)
2009–2012	Fiji	14	(0)
Coaching career
- Years: Team
- 2014–?: Hong Kong Cricket Club
- 2020-?: Anglo-Chinese School (International) Singapore
- 2021-: Dragons Rugby Club Singapore
- –: Dulwich College Singapore

Deacon Tehanakore Manu (born 18 February 1979) is a New Zealand-born retired Fijian rugby union footballer. He played as a prop for the Scarlets in the Pro12, having signed from the Chiefs in 2006.

He was also the head coach of Hong Kong Cricket Club in the HKRFU Premiership, and is now a Physical Education teacher with Dulwich College Singapore.

== Career ==
=== Playing ===
Born in New Plymouth, Taranaki, Manu began his rugby career with Waikato, the province immediately to the north of Taranaki. He made his debut for Waikato in 1999, playing against a Japanese XV. He made a further 65 appearances for Waikato during his time there. In 2001, he was selected for the Waikato Chiefs Super 12 squad. He made his debut for the Chiefs in their opening game of the 2001 Super 12 season, a 42–23 loss to the Waratahs. Manu played for the Chiefs for a further five years before being signed by the Welsh club Scarlets in the summer of 2006. He made his competitive debut for the Scarlets on 8 September 2006, coming on as a 29th-minute substitute for John Davies in a 31–17 victory over the Glasgow Warriors.

Manu has international experience playing for the New Zealand Māori, having played against the British & Irish Lions during their 2005 British & Irish Lions tour to New Zealand. He has also played for the New Zealand Universities and New Zealand Under 21s.

In the lead-up to the 2007 Rugby World Cup, Manu expressed his availability for selection to the Fijian selectors. Although he had played all of his representative rugby for New Zealand teams up to that point, Manu was eligible for Fiji through his Fijian mother. Manu made his debut for Fiji in 2009 against Scotland and captained Fiji in their game against Australia in June 2010. He later returned for the 2010 end of year tour and was handed the captaincy of the Fiji team again. He later captained the side in the 2011 Rugby World Cup. He last represented Fiji on 17 November 2012 against the Ireland Wolfhounds.

=== Coaching ===
On 28 April 2014, Manu announced that he would retire at the end of the 2013-14 European season, and take up the role of Head Coach for Hong Kong Cricket Club, which is a rugby union club that plays in the HKRFU Premiership.

In January 2020, Manu joined Dragons Rugby Club, which plays in the Junior Rugby Clubs Singapore conference, as a head coach.

In March 2020, Manu was appointed by ACS (International) to a PE maternity leave position

In August 2021, Manu was appointed a role as a coach in the Dulwich College Singapore staff.

== Personal life ==
Deacon Manu is married and has 3 children. He is a Christian
