= Lee Williams (rugby union) =

Welsh rugby union footballer

- Born: Lee Williams; 27 October 1986 (age 40) Pontyberem, Carmarthenshire, Wales
- Height: 1.73 m (5 ft 8 in)
- Weight: 80 kg (12 st 8 lb; 180 lb)
- University: UWIC

Rugby union career
- Position: Scrum-half
Senior career
| Years | Team | Apps | (Points) |
| 2002–2004 | Pontyberem | | |
| 2004–2006 | UWIC | | |
| 2004-2011 | Llanelli | 66 | (123) |
| 2011- | Carmarthen Quins | 36 | (100) |
- Correct as of 1 January 2015
Provincial / State sides
| Years | Team | Apps | (Points) |
| 2006–present | Scarlets | 51 | (50) |
- Correct as of 1 January 2015
International career
| Years | Team | Apps | (Points) |
| 2004 | Wales U18 | | |
| 2005 | Wales U19 | | |
- Correct as of 13 February 2008
National sevens team
| Years | Team | | Comps |
| 2006– | Wales Sevens | | |
- Correct as of 13 February 2008
Medal record
Men's rugby sevens
Representing Wales
Rugby World Cup Sevens
| Gold medal – first place | 2009 Dubai | Team competition |

Lee Williams (born 27 October 1986 in Pontyberem, Wales) is a Welsh rugby union footballer who plays at scrum-half for the Scarlets and Wales Sevens, although he played on the wing during the Scarlets' injury crisis in 2008–09.

Williams signed for the Scarlets on a professional development contract in March 2006, having previously played for his hometown club, Pontyberem RFC, and UWIC RFC. Williams attended UWIC, studying for a Business Studies degree.

He was selected in the Wales Sevens squad for 2012-13
