= Scott Roberts (rugby union) =

Welsh rugby union footballer

- Born: Scott Roberts; 5 October 1984 (age 42) Rhondda, Wales
- Height: 183 cm (6 ft 0 in)
- Weight: 118 kg (18 st 8 lb)

Rugby union career
- Current team: Pontypridd RFC
Senior career
Years	Team	Apps	(Points)
2011-	Newport GD	2	(0)

Scott Roberts (born 5 September 1984 in the Rhondda, Wales) is a rugby union prop forward

Roberts has previously played for Pontypridd RFC, Cardiff RFC, Cardiff Blues, Llanelli RFC, the Scarlets and Newport Gwent Dragons.

Roberts was a member of the all-conquering Wales under-21 squad in 2005, having previously represented Wales at under-16 and under-18 levels. A powerful prop, equally at home at loose and tight head, he played for Pontypridd while a member of the Cardiff Blues Academy in 2005–06, scoring a try against Cardiff in the Konica Minolta Cup semi-final. He made his Blue & Blacks' début as a 19th minute replacement against former club Bridgend on 16 September 2006. Roberts made his début for the Blues against the Border Reivers in April 2006.

Midway through the 2008–09 season, Roberts signed for the Carmarthenshire side Llanelli RFC.

In June 2012 Roberts rejoined Pontypridd from Newport Gwent Dragons.
