= Rob Higgitt =

Welsh rugby player (born 1981)

- Born: Robert Higgitt; 12 August 1981 (age 45) St Asaph, Denbighshire
- Height: 1.88 m (6 ft 2 in)
- Weight: 92 kg (14 st 7 lb)
- University: Bath University

Rugby union career
- Position(s): Centre, Wing
Amateur team(s)
Years	Team	Apps	(Points)
- Ruthin
–	Bath University		
- Correct as of 20:21, 24 October 2008 (UTC)
Senior career
Years	Team	Apps	(Points)
2001–2002	Caerphilly	8	(10)
2002–2008	Bristol	111	(100)
2008–2010	Scarlets	28	(10)
2010–2011	Worcester	16	(5)
- Correct as of 24 October 2008

Rob Higgitt (born 12 August 1981) is a Welsh former rugby union player who played as a centre.

Born in St Asaph, Denbighshire, Higgitt began his rugby career with Ruthin, for whom his father was the chairman. He played for Ruthin from the age of 6 until he was 18, when he enrolled at the University of Bath. While playing rugby for the university's team, Higgitt was spotted by Bristol, who signed him up and played him in their Under-21 side. In 2002, he went on a season-long loan to Caerphilly in the Welsh Premier Division. Upon his return to Bristol, they were unable to put him on a professional contract immediately, but when he made the first team in November 2003, the club put him on a £6,000 contract.

In five years in the Bristol first team, Higgitt amassed a total of 111 appearances, scoring 20 tries, and became an integral component of the team's defensive line. At the end of the 2007–08 season, he signed for the Scarlets, one of four Welsh regional sides playing in the Celtic League. He scored the final try scored at Llanelli's famous Stradey Park ground, during the Scarlets' 27–0 victory over Higgitt's former club, Bristol on 24 October 2008.

After a frustrating period of injury he was released by the Scarlets in May 2010. Higgitt joined Worcester Warriors in June on a one-year contract. Higgitt's contract was not renewed for the 2011–12 season.

For the 2011–12 season, Higgitt was player-coach at South West 1 West club Thornbury RFC working alongside former Wales captain Gareth Llewellyn.
