= Stephen Jones (rugby union) =

Wales and British Lions international rugby union player (born 1977)

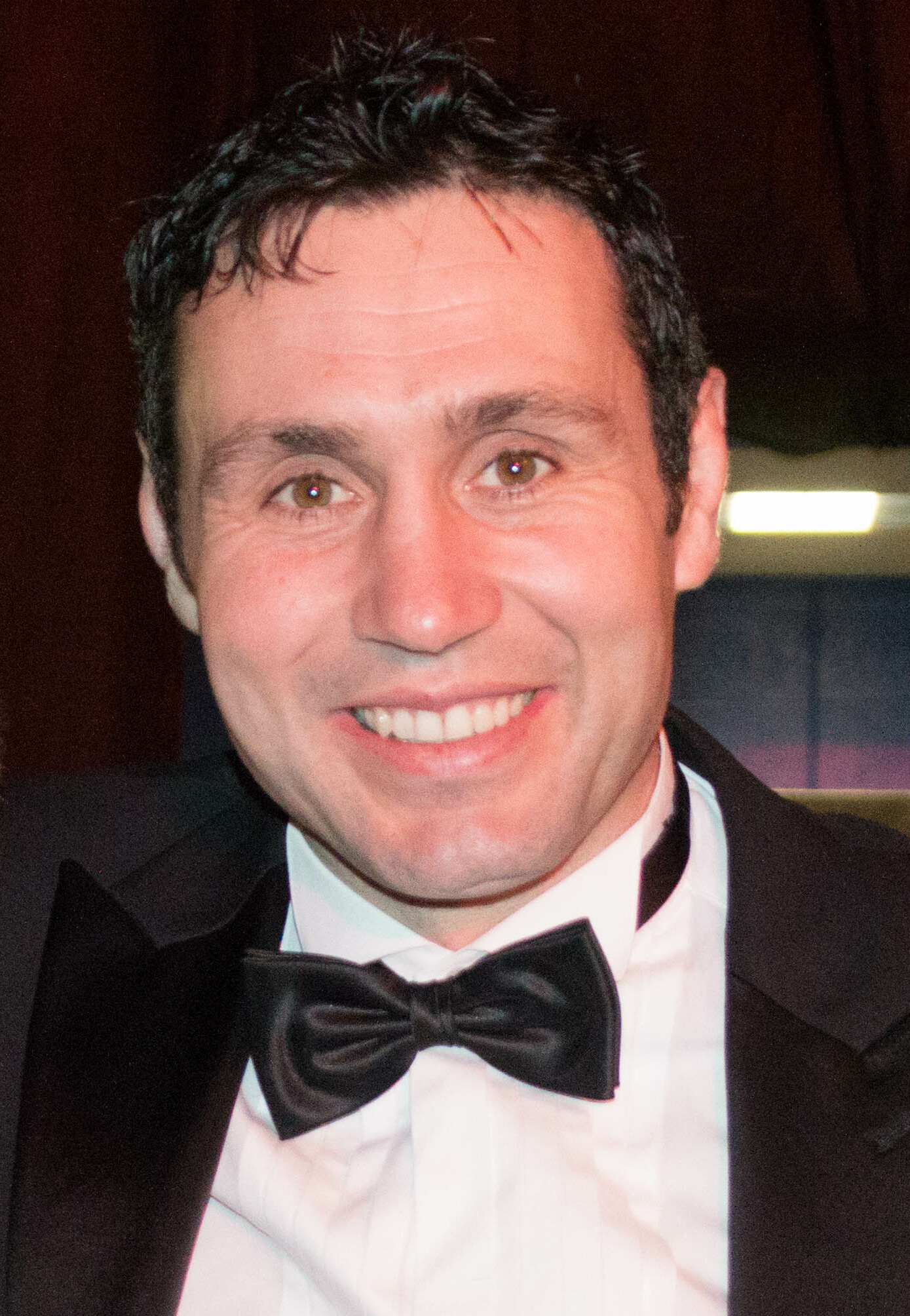
- Full name: Stephen Michael Jones
- Born: 8 December 1977 (age 48) Aberystwyth, Wales
- Height: 1.85 m (6 ft 1 in)
- Weight: 94 kg (14 st 11 lb)

Rugby union career
- Position(s): Fly-half; Inside centre
Senior career
| Years | Team | Apps | (Points) |
| 1996–2003 | Llanelli | 197 | (1786) |
| 2003–2004 | Llanelli Scarlets | 12 | (146) |
| 2004–2006 | Clermont Auvergne | 43 | (566) |
| 2006–2012 | Scarlets | 107 | (918) |
| 2012–2013 | London Wasps | 15 | (136) |
International career
| Years | Team | Apps | (Points) |
- Wales U16
- Wales U18
- Wales U19
- Wales U21
- Wales Schools
| 1998–2011 | Wales | 104 | (917) |
| 2005, 2009 | British & Irish Lions | 6 | (53) |
Coaching career
- Years: Team
- 2013–2015: London Wasps (attack coach)
- 2015–2019: Scarlets (backs coach)
- 2019–2022: Wales (attack coach)
- 2024-2025: Moana Pasifika (assistant coach)
- 2025-2026: Newcastle Red Bulls (assistant coach)
- 2026-: Newcastle Red Bulls (interim coach)

Stephen Michael Jones (born 8 December 1977) is a Welsh rugby union coach and former player who played primarily at fly-half. He played more than 100 times for Wales and six times for the British & Irish Lions.

Jones was the record cap holder for Wales until he was overtaken by Gethin Jenkins on 15 March 2014. With 970 international points, Jones is eighth in the List of leading rugby union test point scorers, and the second-highest Wales player on the list behind Neil Jenkins.

At the end of the 2012–13 season, Jones retired from playing professional rugby to take up a coaching position at London Wasps and in August 2015 he joined the Scarlets as backs coach.

== Club career ==
=== Llanelli RFC ===
Jones was born in Aberystwyth. He joined Llanelli RFC in 1996, staying there until the 2003–04 season. He played his last Welsh club season for the Llanelli Scarlets, the Llanelli side in the Welsh regional setup introduced that year. In his Welsh top-level career, he made more than 200 appearances and scored almost 2,000 points.

=== Clermont Auvergne ===
In 2004, he joined Clermont Auvergne, formerly known as Montferrand. He had a successful club career with Clermont and he was chosen by French journalists as the fly-half of the season in his second year at the club.

=== Scarlets ===
After two years at Clermont he returned to play for the Scarlets in 2006. Back in Llanelli, Jones and the team had an excellent run in the Heineken Cup in 2007 and reached the semi-finals after wins home and away against Ulster and Toulouse, and a comfortable home victory against 2006 winners Munster in the quarter-finals. The Scarlets ultimately came unstuck against Leicester in the semi-final.

Jones ended speculation over his future by signing a new three-year contract with the Scarlets. He had been heavily linked with a move to French club Biarritz after triggering a clause in his contract allowing him to talk to other clubs.

=== London Wasps ===
On 11 April 2012, it was announced that Jones would be leaving the Scarlets for a second time to join London Wasps at the end of the 2011–12 season. He agreed to a two-year contract that could see him move into a coaching role at the end of his playing career. In February 2013, Jones announced that he would retire from playing a year early, at the end of the 2012–13 season, and move into coaching with Wasps.

=== Return to Scarlets ===
On 12 January 2015, it was announced that Jones would be returning to Scarlets at the end of the 2014-15 season as backs coach.

== Representative career ==
=== Wales ===
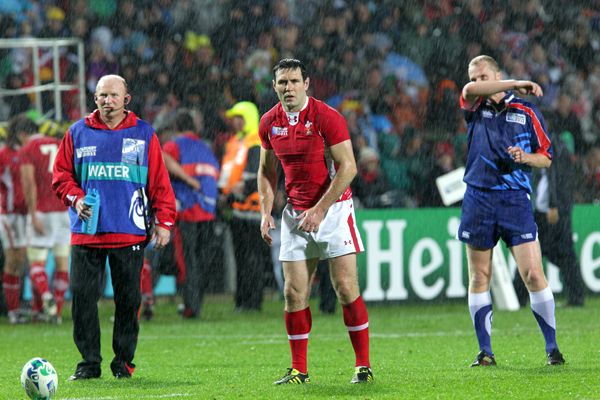
Stephen Jones kicking at goal during the Wales versus Fiji match of the 2011 Rugby World Cup

Jones made his international debut for Wales in 1998 against South Africa.

Jones played a prominent role in Wales' Grand Slam triumph of 2005. As a fly-half, he scored the majority of the team's points, his best game being the victory in Paris, in which he scored 14 points including a drop goal and made a 60-metre break that led to Martyn Williams' first try. In the championship decider against Ireland at the Millennium Stadium, he scored another 16 points and steered Wales to their first Grand Slam for 27 years. He was later named fly-half of the championship for 2005.

In October 2006 head coach Gareth Jenkins named Jones as captain to lead Wales through to the 2007 World Cup. On his appointment of Jones, Jenkins said "Stephen has all the attributes to make a magnificent captain of his country. He has the respect and regard of his players, leadership qualities that are evident for all to see and the talent and ability to lead from the front at game time". Jenkins had a change of heart however, as Jones was replaced by Gareth Thomas as captain for the tournament itself, as Jones was not assured of his place in the Welsh team due to the emergence of James Hook. In his eight outings as Wales captain, Jones led Wales to only one win with six defeats and one draw.

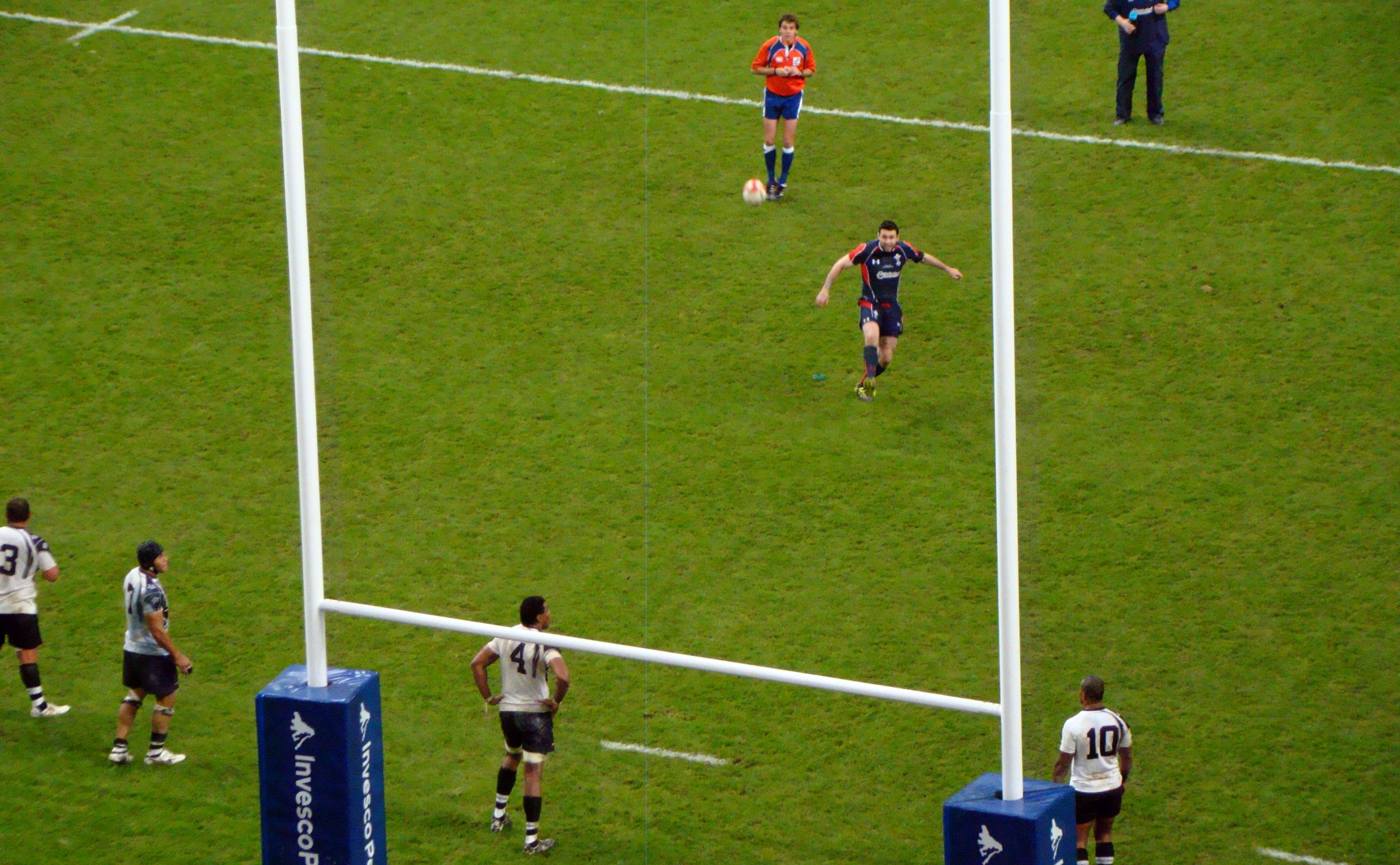
Jones converts a try, Wales v Fiji, 2010

In the 2008 RBS Six Nations, Jones made four appearances in his second Grand Slam championship win with Wales. He scored seven conversions and 10 penalties, adding up to 44 points, despite starting the tournament as second choice to James Hook.

In the 2009 RBS Six Nations, Jones made five appearances in the competition with Wales. An improvement to the previous year's competition he proved to be the in-form player, cementing his place as the first-choice number 10 for Wales. Jones almost prevented Ireland from winning the Grand Slam in the last minute of the final game of the tournament, but his 50-yard penalty kick fell short.

Jones became the record cap holder for Wales on 26 September 2011 versus Namibia, overtaking the record of 100 caps set by Gareth Thomas.

Jones was selected as part of the 30-man Welsh squad for the Rugby World Cup 2011. He played his 103rd Test against France in the semi-final which Wales lost, coming off the bench to replace James Hook in the 45th minute. His 104th and final cap came in the third-place play-off match against Australia on 21 October 2011.

In May 2012, the Barbarians had hoped to select Jones for a match against Wales on 2 June, in which he would potentially play alongside his former half-back partner for the Scarlets and Wales, Dwayne Peel; however, both players were ruled out due to injury.

=== British & Irish Lions ===
Having been part of the Wales team that won the 2005 Six Nations Championship Grand Slam with Wales, Jones was the in-form fly-half selected for the 2005 British & Irish Lions tour to New Zealand. With four fly-halves in the squad, Jones was involved in just two of the tour matches, starting against the New Zealand Māori and replacing Jonny Wilkinson against Wellington. For the first Test, both Jones and Wilkinson were selected in the starting line-up ahead of Ronan O'Gara and Charlie Hodgson, with Jones at fly-half and Wilkinson at inside centre; however, Jones lost his place in the team for the second Test, with Wilkinson taking over at fly-half. Having lost both of the first two matches, Sir Clive Woodward restored Jones to the starting line-up for the dead rubber third Test, in which he scored 14 points as the Lions lost 38–19. Woodward's decision to select Wilkinson ahead of Jones was questioned by the media, many of whom doubted whether the English fly-half should even have been picked for the tour, having only recently recovered from a serious shoulder injury.

On 21 April 2009, Jones was named in the squad for the 2009 British & Irish Lions tour to South Africa. During 2009, Jones cemented his place as Wales' first-choice number 10 and earned his place in the Lions squad. He started all three Tests and broke the Lions record for most points scored against South Africa in the second Test.

=== International tries ===
| Try | Opponent | Location | Venue | Competition | Date | Result |
|---|---|---|---|---|---|---|
| 1 | Ireland | Dublin, Ireland | Lansdowne Road | 2000 Six Nations | 1 April 2000 | Win |
| 2 | Ireland | Dublin, Ireland | Lansdowne Road | 2002 Six Nations | 3 February 2002 | Loss |
| 3 | Ireland | Cardiff, Wales | Millennium Stadium | 2003 Six Nations | 22 March 2003 | Loss |
| 4 | England | Brisbane, Australia | Lang Park | 2003 Rugby World Cup | 9 November 2003 | Loss |
| 5 | Romania | Cardiff, Wales | Millennium Stadium | 2004 Autumn Internationals | 12 November 2004 | Win |
| 6 | Italy | Cardiff, Wales | Millennium Stadium | 2006 Six Nations | 11 March 2006 | Win |
| 7 | Argentina | Cardiff, Wales | Millennium Stadium | 2009 Autumn Internationals | 21 November 2009 | Win |

== Personal life ==
Jones and his wife Gwen have three sons together. At the 2014 National Eisteddfod in Llanelli, Jones was honoured by the Gorsedd of Bards for services to Wales.

A Welsh speaker, Jones is one of several players to have been featured in the S4C series Rygbi a Mwy.
