= 2009–10 Heineken Cup pool stage =

- Season: 2009–10 Heineken Cup
- Date: 9 October 2009 – 24 January 2010

Qualifiers
- Seed 1: (Ireland) Munster
- Seed 2: (France) Biarritz
- Seed 3: (France) Toulouse
- Seed 4: (Ireland) Leinster
- Seed 5: (France) Clermont
- Seed 6: (France) Stade Français
- Seed 7: (Wales) Ospreys
- Seed 8: (England) Northampton

The pool stage of the 2009–10 Heineken Cup was the opening phase of the annual competition, in which 24 teams were arranged into six pools contesting of four teams each and then competed in a home-and-away double round robin. Eight teams, specifically the six pool winners and the two best runners-up, qualified for the quarter-finals, starting a knock-out phase that will end with the final at Stade de France in the Paris suburb of Saint-Denis.

For the first time, the third- through fifth-ranking runners-up parachuted into the knockout stage of the European Challenge Cup. Also for the first time, the winner of the Heineken Cup will receive an automatic berth in the following season's competition. The draw for the pools took place on 9 June 2009 in Paris.

== Seeding within pools ==
The seeding system was the same as in the 2008–09 tournament. The 24 competing teams were ranked based on past Heineken Cup and European Challenge Cup performance, with each pool receiving one team from each quartile, or Tier. The requirement to have only one team per country in each pool, however, still applied (with the exception of the inclusion of the seventh English team).

The brackets show each team's European Rugby Club Ranking at the start of the 2009–10 season.

| Tier 1 | (Ireland) Munster (1) | (England) Leicester Tigers (2) | (Ireland) Leinster (3) | (France) Toulouse (4) | (England) Bath (5) | (France) Biarritz (6) |
| Tier 2 | (Wales) Cardiff Blues (8) | (France) Stade Français (9) | (England) Gloucester (10) | (France) Perpignan (11) | (Wales) Ospreys (13) | (England) London Irish (14) |
| Tier 3 | (England) Northampton Saints (15) | (England) Sale Sharks (16) | (France) Clermont (17) | (Wales) Scarlets (18) | (Ireland) Ulster Rugby (20) | (Wales) Newport Gwent Dragons (21) |
| Tier 4 | (England) Harlequins (23) | (Scotland) Glasgow Warriors (24) | (Scotland) Edinburgh (26) | (Italy) Benetton Treviso (28) | (France) Brive (29) | (Italy) Viadana (36) |

== Seeding for the knockout phase ==
The winners of each of the six pools were seeded 1 to 6 first by competition points, then tries scored, and finally score difference. The runners-up were similarly sorted, and the best two were seeded seven and eight and progressed to the quarter-finals alongside the six winners. The top four seeds are given home matches in the quarter-finals, with seed 1 playing seed 8, seed 2 playing seed 7, etc.

After the two second-place teams advancing to the Heineken Cup quarter-finals were determined, the next three second-place finishers parachuted into the quarter-finals of the Amlin Challenge Cup. These teams became the 5th through 7th seeds in the Challenge Cup knockout phase, and played their quarter-finals away.

== Pools ==
Key to colours
| Winner of each pool, advance to quarterfinals. Seed # in parentheses |
| Two highest-scoring second-place teams, advance to quarterfinals. Seed # in parentheses. |
| Third- through fifth-highest-scoring second-place teams parachute into the knockout stage of the European Challenge Cup. Seed # in brackets [ ]. |

=== Pool 1 ===
| Team | P | W | D | L | Tries for | Tries against | Try diff | Points for | Points against | Points diff | TB | LB | Pts |
|---|---|---|---|---|---|---|---|---|---|---|---|---|---|
| (Ireland) Munster (1) | 6 | 5 | 0 | 1 | 19 | 10 | 9 | 185 | 94 | 91 | 3 | 1 | 24 |
| (England) Northampton Saints (8) | 6 | 4 | 0 | 2 | 16 | 8 | 8 | 138 | 104 | 34 | 2 | 1 | 19 |
| (France) Perpignan | 6 | 2 | 0 | 4 | 12 | 10 | 2 | 108 | 123 | −15 | 1 | 2 | 11 |
| (Italy) Benetton Treviso | 6 | 1 | 0 | 5 | 7 | 26 | −19 | 68 | 178 | −110 | 0 | 1 | 5 |

10 October 2009
13:30

| Benetton Treviso (Italy) | 9–8 | (France) Perpignan |
| Pen: Goosen (3/4) 22', 39', 63' | Report | Try: Porical 77' m Pen: Porical (1/2) 54' |

Stadio Comunale di Monigo, Treviso
Attendance: 2,800
Referee: Andrew Small (England)

10 October 2009
18:00

| Northampton Saints (England) | 31–27 | (Ireland) Munster |
| Tries: Ashton (2) 17' m, 45' c Geraghty 40' c Con: Geraghty (2/3); Pen: Geraghty (4/6) 10', 34', 38', 75' | Report | Tries: Wallace 25' m O'Leary 68' c Con: O'Gara (1/2); Pen: O'Gara (4/5) 32', 36', 49', 61'; Drop: Warwick 20' |

Franklin's Gardens, Northampton
Attendance: 13,550
Referee: Christophe Berdos (France)

16 October 2009
21:00

| Perpignan (France) | 29–13 | (England) Northampton Saints |
| Tries: Penalty try 17' c Marty 39' c Con: Porical (2/2); Pen: Porical (5/6) 7', 23', 51', 66', 70' | Report | Tries: Ashton 27' m Mujati 45' m Pen: Geraghty (1/1) 22' |

Stade Aimé Giral, Perpignan
Attendance: 12,854
Referee: Nigel Owens (Wales)

17 October 2009
13:35

| Munster (Ireland) | 41–10 | (Italy) Benetton Treviso |
| Tries: Warwick 30' c Dowling (2) 40' m, 68' c Leamy 42' m Fogarty 54' m Wallace 64' c de Villiers 76' m Con: O'Gara (3/7) | Report | Tries: Williams 15' m Vilk 25' m |

Thomond Park, Limerick
Attendance: 26,000
Referee: Jérôme Garces (France)

11 December 2009
20:00

| Munster (Ireland) | 24–23 | (France) Perpignan |
| Pen: O'Gara (7/9) 3', 10', 25', 36', 46', 63', 75'; Drop: O'Gara (1/2) 55' | Report | Tries: Vivalda 5' m Durand 12' c Burger 70' m Con: Porical (1/2); Pen: Porical (1/1) 52'; Mélé (1/1) 65' |

Thomond Park, Limerick
Attendance: 26,000
Referee: Wayne Barnes (England)

12 December 2009
15:00

| Northampton Saints (England) | 30–18 | (Italy) Benetton Treviso |
| Tries: Foden 40' m Ansbro 43' m Ashton (2) 46' c, 53' c Con: Geraghty (2/4); Pen: Geraghty (1/2) 12'; Myler (1/1) 67' | Report | Tries: Vermaak 5' c Goosen 58' m Con: Botes (1/2); Drop: Goosen (2) 17', 34' |

Franklin's Gardens, Northampton
Attendance: 12,071
Referee: Pascal Gauzère (France)

19 December 2009
14:30

| Benetton Treviso (Italy) | 18–21 | (England) Northampton Saints |
| Tries: Mulleri 51' m Penalty try 73' c Con: Botes (1/2); Pen: Goosen 58'; Botes 55' | Report | Tries: Dowson 37' c Clarke 45' c Lawes 69' c Con: Myler (2/2); Geraghty (1/1) |

Stadio Comunale di Monigo, Treviso
Attendance: 2,500
Referee: Peter Fitzgibbon (Ireland)

20 December 2009
16:00

| Perpignan (France) | 14–37 | (Ireland) Munster |
| Tries: Guirado 67 m Con: Mélé (1/1); Pen: Mélé (3/5) 4', 30', 35' | Report | Tries: Fogarty 22' c Hurley 58' c de Villiers 69' c Howlett 80' c Con: O'Gara (3/3); Warwick (1/1); Pen: O'Gara (3/3) 13', 44', 49' |

Stade Aimé Giral, Perpignan
Attendance: 14,282
Referee: Dave Pearson (England)

16 January 2010
14:35

| Benetton Treviso (Italy) | 7–44 | (Ireland) Munster |
| Try: Zanni 24' c Con: Goosen (1/1) | Report | Try: Hurley 3' m Earls (2) 6' m, 63' c O'Callaghan 11' c Warwick 33' c Ryan 80' c Con: O'Gara (3/5); Warwick (1/1); Pen: O'Gara (2/2) 15', 29' |

Stadio Comunale di Monigo, Treviso
Attendance: 6,000
Referee: Chris White (England)

17 January 2010
15:00

| Northampton Saints (England) | 34–0 | (France) Perpignan |
| Try: Ashton 43' c Dowson 54' c Dickson 61' c Clarke 80' c Con: Geraghty (3/3); Myler (1/1); Pen: Geraghty (2/3) 26', 35' | Report |

Franklin's Gardens, Northampton
Attendance: 13,081
Referee: Alain Rolland (Ireland)

22 January 2010
20:00

| Munster (Ireland) | 12–9 | (England) Northampton Saints |
| Pen: O'Gara (4/5) 3', 40', 56', 70' | Report | Pen: Reihana (1/2) 32'; Geraghty (1/2) 53'; Myler (1/1) 74' |

Thomond Park, Limerick
Attendance: 26,000
Referee: Romain Poite (France)

22 January 2010
21:00

| Perpignan (France) | 34–6 | (Italy) Benetton Treviso |
| Tries: Geli 40' m Țincu (2) 47' c, 70' m Vivalda 67' c Grandclaude 76' c Pen: Laharrague (1) 25'; Con: Laharrague (2/4); Porical (1/1) | Report | Pen: Goosen (1) 19'; Botes (1) 53' |

Stade Aimé Giral, Perpignan
Attendance: 9,554
Referee: Peter Allan (Scotland)

=== Pool 2 ===
| Team | P | W | D | L | Tries for | Tries against | Try diff | Points for | Points against | Points diff | TB | LB | Pts |
|---|---|---|---|---|---|---|---|---|---|---|---|---|---|
| (France) Biarritz (2) | 6 | 5 | 0 | 1 | 19 | 8 | 11 | 188 | 97 | 91 | 3 | 0 | 23 |
| (England) Gloucester [6] | 6 | 4 | 0 | 2 | 12 | 12 | 0 | 119 | 129 | −10 | 1 | 0 | 17 |
| (Scotland) Glasgow Warriors | 6 | 2 | 0 | 4 | 9 | 14 | −5 | 120 | 140 | −20 | 0 | 1 | 9 |
| (Wales) Newport Gwent Dragons | 6 | 1 | 0 | 5 | 12 | 18 | −6 | 108 | 169 | −61 | 0 | 2 | 6 |

9 October 2009
20:00

| Gloucester (England) | 19–17 | (Wales) Newport Gwent Dragons |
| Try: Qera 23' c Con: Robinson (1/1); Pen: Robinson (4/5) 44', 52', 54', 74' | Report | Try: Arlidge 30' c Bearman 35' c Con: Arlidge (2/2); Pen: Arlidge (1/2) 58' |

Kingsholm, Gloucester
Attendance: 11,846
Referee: Peter Fitzgibbon (Ireland)

10 October 2009
15:45

| Glasgow Warriors (Scotland) | 18–22 | (France) Biarritz |
| Pen: Parks (5/6) 5', 9', 16', 27', 42'; Drop: Parks 58' | Report | Try: Lund 49' c< Con: Yachvili (1/1); Pen: Yachvili (3/4) 19', 30', 65'; Drop: Traille 22'; Bosch 40' |

Firhill Arena, Glasgow
Attendance: 3,111
Referee: Wayne Barnes (England)

16 October 2009
19:30

| Newport Gwent Dragons (Wales) | 22–14 | (Scotland) Glasgow Warriors |
| Try: A. Jones 12' c Charteris 38' m M. Thomas 40' c Con: Arlidge (2/3); Drop: Arlidge (1/1) 37' | Report | Try: Beattie 24' c Tkachuk 55' c Con: Parks (2/2) |

Rodney Parade, Newport
Attendance: 6,119
Referee: Romain Poite (France)

17 October 2009
14:35

| Biarritz (France) | 42–15 | (England) Gloucester |
| Try: Ngwenya (3) 36' m, 40' c, 50' c Erinle 60' c Courrent 78' c Con: Yachvili (4/5); Pen: Yachvili (3/4) 2', 14', 27' | Report | Try: Voyce 56' m Boer 67' c Con: Burns (1/2); Pen: Robinson (1/1) 9' |

Parc des Sports Aguiléra, Biarritz
Attendance: 10,200
Referee: Alan Lewis (Ireland)

11 December 2009
19:30

| Glasgow Warriors (Scotland) | 33–11 | (England) Gloucester |
| Try: M. Evans 33' m Stortoni 37' c Con: Parks (1/2); Pen: Parks (7/8) 3', 7', 14', 21', 26', 44', 75' | Report | Try: Sharples 23' m Pen: Robinson (2/2) 11', 16' |

Firhill Arena, Glasgow
Attendance: 4,462
Referee: Christophe Berdos (France)

13 December 2009
13:45

| Biarritz (France) | 49–13 | (Wales) Newport Gwent Dragons |
| Try: Penalty try 19' c Yachvili 29' c Ngwenya 31' c Balshaw (2) 45' m, 55' c Courrent 78' c Con: Yachvili (4/5); Courrent (1/1); Pen: Yachvili (3/4) 5', 15', 27' | Report | Try: Riley 59' c Con: Arlidge (1/1); Pen: Arlidge (2/2) 10', 28' |

Parc des Sports Aguiléra, Biarritz
Attendance: 6,000
Referee: Peter Allan (Scotland)

19 December 2009
13:35

| Newport Gwent Dragons (Wales) | 8–26 | (France) Biarritz |
| Try: Fussell 5' m Pen: Arlidge (1/1) 40' | Report | Try: Yachvili (2) 59' c, 79' c Con: Yachvili (2/2); Pen: Yachvili (3/3) 3', 16', 40'; Drop: Traille (1/1) 52' |

Parc y Scarlets, Pemberton
Attendance: 672
Referee: Alain Rolland (Ireland)

- This match was moved to the Scarlets' home ground due to a frozen pitch at the Dragons' home of Rodney Parade.

20 December 2009
12:45

| Gloucester (England) | 19–6 | (Scotland) Glasgow Warriors |
| Try: Sharples 57' m Brown 70' m Pen: Robinson (3/3) 42', 51', 65' | Report | Pen: Parks (1/2) 13'; Drop: Parks (1/1) 26' |

Kingsholm, Gloucester
Attendance: 10,342
Referee: Jérôme Garces (France)

15 January 2010
19:30

| Glasgow Warriors (Scotland) | 29–25 | (Wales) Newport Gwent Dragons |
| Try: Dewey 1' c Beattie 3' m Thomson 63' m Con: Jackson (1/2); Pen: Jackson (3/3) 10', 30', 37; Gregor (1/1) 19' | Report | Try: Sidoli 5' m Harris 24' c Gomer-Davies 34' c Con: Connor (1/2); Tovey (1/1); Pen: Connor (1/1) 50'; Arlidge (1/1) 61' |

Firhill Arena, Glasgow
Attendance: 2,626
Referee: Peter Fitzgibbon (Ireland)

16 January 2010
15:00

| Gloucester (England) | 23–8 | (France) Biarritz |
| Try: Vainikolo 20' c Molenaar 66' c Con: Robinson (2/2); Pen: Robinson (3/4) 11', 33', 46' | Report | Try: Harinordoquy 75' m Con: Tranier (0/1); Pen: Courrent (1/2) 27' |

Kingsholm, Gloucester
Attendance: 10,103
Referee: George Clancy (Ireland)

24 January 2010
13:45

| Biarritz (France) | 41–20 | (Scotland) Glasgow Warriors |
| Try: Coetzee 36' m Ngwenys 64' c Penalty try 68' c Bolakoro 79' c Con: Courrent (3/4); Pen: Courrent (5/7) 3', 28', 52', 56', 62' | Report | Try: T. Evans 10' c Cusiter 49' c Con: Parks (2/2); Pen: Parks (2/3) 22', 24' |

Parc des Sports Aguiléra, Biarritz
Attendance: 8,000
Referee: Dave Pearson (England)

24 January 2010
12:45

| Newport Gwent Dragons (Wales) | 23–32 | (England) Gloucester |
| Try: Gomer-Davies 33' c Smith 80' c Con: Arlidge (1/1); Tovey (1/1); Pen: Arlidge (2) 20', 27'; Drop: Arlidge 40' | Report | Try: Qera (3) 22' c, 43' m, 65' c Penalty try 69' c Con: Robinson (3/4); Pen: Robinson (2) 8', 60' |

Rodney Parade, Newport
Attendance: 5,653
Referee: Christophe Berdos (France)

=== Pool 3 ===
| Team | P | W | D | L | Tries for | Tries against | Try diff | Points for | Points against | Points diff | TB | LB | Pts |
|---|---|---|---|---|---|---|---|---|---|---|---|---|---|
| (France) Clermont Auvergne (5) | 6 | 4 | 0 | 2 | 24 | 11 | 13 | 201 | 120 | 81 | 3 | 2 | 21 |
| (Wales) Ospreys (7) | 6 | 4 | 1 | 1 | 21 | 11 | 10 | 188 | 121 | 67 | 2 | 0 | 20 |
| (England) Leicester Tigers | 6 | 3 | 1 | 2 | 23 | 10 | 13 | 187 | 123 | 64 | 3 | 1 | 18 |
| (Italy) Viadana | 6 | 0 | 0 | 6 | 6 | 42 | −36 | 83 | 295 | −212 | 0 | 0 | 0 |

10 October 2009
16:00

| Clermont Auvergne (France) | 36–18 | (Italy) Viadana |
| Try: Bai 1' c Russell (2) 17' c, 73' c Debaty 57' m Privat 59' m Con: Parra (3/4); James (1/1); Pen: Parra (1/1) 12' | Report | Pen: Hola (3/4) 5', 62', 66'; Law (3/4) 25', 33', 50' |

Stade Marcel-Michelin, Clermont-Ferrand
Attendance: 13,970
Referee: Peter Allan (Scotland)

11 October 2009
12:45

| Leicester Tigers (England) | 32–32 | (Wales) Ospreys |
| Try: J. Murphy 2' m Twelvetrees 38' c González Amorosino 47' c Staunton 74' c Con: Staunton (2/3); Twelvetrees (1/1); Pen: Staunton (1/4) 10'; Twelvetrees (1/2) 66' | Report | Try: Williams 22' c Bowe 31' c Con: Biggar (2/2); Pen: Biggar (5/5) 13', 21', 34', 42', 63'; Drop: Biggar (1/2) 25' |

Welford Road, Leicester
Attendance: 20,029
Referee: Alain Rolland (Ireland)

17 October 2009
14:30

| Viadana (Italy) | 11–46 | (England) Leicester Tigers |
| Try: Robertson 26' m Pen: Hola (2/3) 21', 52' | Report | Try: J. Murphy 9' m Hamilton (3) 30' c, 60' m, 75' m Croft 36' c González Amorosino 67' c Penalty try 79' c Con: Staunton (2/3); Twelvetrees (2/4); Pen: Staunton (1/1) 5' |

Stadio Luigi Zaffanella, Viadana
Attendance: 4,320
Referee: Pascal Gauzère (France)

18 October 2009
12:45

| Ospreys (Wales) | 25–24 | (France) Clermont Auvergne |
| Try: Bowe 9' m R. Jones 28' c Davies 40'+1' c Con: Biggar (2/3); Pen: Biggar (1/2) 64'; Drop: Hook 2' | Report | Try: Baby 42' c Domingo 50' c Lapandry 53' c' Con: James (3/3); Drop: James 20' |

Liberty Stadium, Swansea
Attendance: 9,238
Referee: Wayne Barnes (England)

12 December 2009
14:30

| Viadana (Italy) | 7–62 | (Wales) Ospreys |
| Try: Quinnell 53' c Con: Law (1/1) | Report | Try: A. W. Jones 15' c Walker 22' c Januarie 31' c Collins 33' c Hibbard (2) 42' c, 59' c Bowe 60' c Owen 67' c Con: Biggar (8/8); Pen: Biggar (2/2) 5', 38' |

Stadio Luigi Zaffanella, Viadana
Attendance: 8,348
Referee: Romain Poite (France)

13 December 2009
16:00

| Clermont Auvergne (France) | 40–30 | (England) Leicester Tigers |
| Try: Lapandry 10' c Nalaga (2) 25' c, 40' m Parra 56' c Cudmore 73' m Con: James (3/5); Pen: James (2/2) 1', 45'; Drop: Floch 35' | Report | Try: Allen 70' c Flood 72' c Staunton 77' c Con: Flood (3/3); Pen: Flood (3/3) 6', 22', 29' |

Stade Marcel-Michelin, Clermont-Ferrand
Attendance: 14,657
Referee: Alan Lewis (Ireland)

19 December 2009
14:30

| Ospreys (Wales) | 45–19 | (Italy) Viadana |
| Try: Bowe (2) 24' c, 70' c Tiatia 32' c Parker 37' c Owen 42'c Walker 74' c Con: Biggar (6/6); Pen: Biggar (1/1) 7' | Report | Try: Quinnell 72' c Con: Law (1/1); Pen: Law (4/5) 9', 40', 49', 58' |

Liberty Stadium, Swansea
Attendance: 7,974
Referee: Christophe Berdos (France)

19 December 2009
18:00

| Leicester Tigers (England) | 20–15 | (France) Clermont Auvergne |
| Try: Allen 29' c Hamilton 75' c Con: Flood (2/2); Pen: Flood (2/3) 13', 21' | Report | Pen: James (2/5) 40', 77'; Drop: James (3/3) 19', 25', 65' |

Welford Road, Leicester
Attendance: 21,286
Referee: Nigel Owens (Wales)

16 January 2010
14:00

| Leicester Tigers (England) | 47–8 | (Italy) Viadana |
| Try: Hipkiss (2) 6' c, 70' c Woods 20' c Flood 32' c Hamilton (2) 34' c, 39' c Mauger 74' m Con: Flood (5/5); Vesty (1/2) | Report | Try: Canavosio 55' m Pen: Law (1/1) 8' |

Welford Road, Leicester
Attendance: 21,726
Referee: James Jones (Wales)

16 January 2010
16:45

| Clermont Auvergne (France) | 27–7 | (Wales) Ospreys |
| Try: Malzieu 61' m Nalaga 77' c Con: James (1/2); Pen: James (4/7) 15', 22', 34', 69'; Drop: James (1/3) 39' | Report | Try: Bowe 6' c Con: Biggar (1/1) |

Stade Marcel-Michelin, Clermont-Ferrand
Attendance: 15,482
Referee: Dave Pearson (England)

23 January 2010
14:35

| Viadana (Italy) | 20–59 | (France) Clermont Auvergne |
| Try: García 66' c Krause 78' c Con: Hola (2/2); Pen: Law (1/2) 42'; Drop: Johannson (1/1) 8' | Report | Try: Parra 1' c Rougerie (2) 21' c, 34' c Nalaga (2) 25' m, 55' m Vermeulen 48' c Malzieu 51' c Penalty try 63' c Bonnaire 77' c Con: James (6/8); Floch (1/1) |

Stadio Luigi Zaffanella, Viadana
Attendance: 1,800
Referee: Andrew Small (England)

23 January 2010
13:35

| Ospreys (Wales) | 17–12 | (England) Leicester Tigers |
| Try: Bowe 38' m Pen: Biggar (3/4) 13', 25', 54'; Drop: Biggar (1/3) 8' | Report | Pen: Flood (3/4) 6', 11', 50'; Drop: Staunton (1/2) 22' |

Liberty Stadium, Swansea
Attendance: 15,626
Referee: Alan Lewis (Ireland)

=== Pool 4 ===
| Team | P | W | D | L | Tries for | Tries against | Try diff | Points for | Points against | Points diff | TB | LB | Pts |
|---|---|---|---|---|---|---|---|---|---|---|---|---|---|
| (France) Stade Français (6) | 6 | 4 | 0 | 2 | 11 | 7 | 4 | 124 | 95 | 29 | 1 | 1 | 18 |
| (Ireland) Ulster | 6 | 4 | 0 | 2 | 11 | 6 | 5 | 127 | 94 | 33 | 0 | 1 | 17 |
| (Scotland) Edinburgh | 6 | 3 | 0 | 3 | 3 | 10 | −7 | 64 | 94 | −30 | 0 | 1 | 13 |
| (England) Bath | 6 | 1 | 0 | 5 | 6 | 8 | −2 | 84 | 116 | −32 | 0 | 3 | 7 |

9 October 2009
19:30

| Ulster (Ireland) | 26–12 | (England) Bath |
| Try: Nagusa 13' c Faloon 52' c Con: Humphreys (2/2); Pen: Humphreys (3/4) 10', 56', 78'; Drop: Humphreys 42' | Report | Pen: Davis (4/4) 8', 20', 48', 54' |

Ravenhill, Belfast
Attendance: 10,914
Referee: James Jones (Wales)

10 October 2009
14:35

| Stade Français (France) | 31–7 | (Scotland) Edinburgh |
| Try: Arias 7' c Parisse 9' c Papé 23' c Beauxis 29' c Con: Dupuy (4/4); Pen: Oelschig (1/1) 59' | Report | Try: Cairns 72' c Con: Godman (1/1) |

Stade Jean-Bouin, Paris
Attendance: 8,933
Referee: Nigel Owens (Wales)

17 October 2009
15:45

| Edinburgh (Scotland) | 17–13 | (Ireland) Ulster |
| Try: Visser 70' m Pen: Godman (4/6) 2', 21', 67', 80' | Report | Try: Nagusa 22' c Con: Humphreys (1/1); Pen: Humphreys (2/3) 29', 45' |

Murrayfield, Edinburgh
Attendance: 5,747
Referee: Dave Pearson (England)

18 October 2009
15:00

| Bath (England) | 27–29 | (France) Stade Français |
| Try: Little 20' m Carraro 25' c Con: Little (1/2); Pen: Little (5/5) 11', 30', 34', 45', 71' | Report | Try: Phillips 75' m Pen: Dupuy (7/8) 18', 27', 38', 47', 53', 69', 79'; Drop: Beauxis (1/4) 6' |

Recreation Ground, Bath
Attendance: 11,700
Referee: George Clancy (Ireland)

12 December 2009
13:35

| Ulster (Ireland) | 23–13 | (France) Stade Français |
| Try: Brady 20' c Danielli 48' c Con: Humphreys (2/2); Pen: Humphreys (3/4) 13', 34', 47' | Report | Try: Arias 74' c Con: Oelschig (1/1); Pen: Beauxis (2/3) 18', 28' |

Ravenhill, Belfast
Attendance: 11,000
Referee: Dave Pearson (England)

13 December 2009
15:00

| Bath (England) | 16–9 | (Scotland) Edinburgh |
| Try: Dixon 2' m Stephenson 29' m Con: Little (0/2); Pen: Little (2/2) 6', 72' | Report | Pen: Paterson (3/3) 12', 20', 37'; Drop: Godman (0/1) |

Recreation Ground, Bath
Attendance: 11,600
Referee: Alain Rolland (Ireland)

19 December 2009
13:35

| Edinburgh (Scotland) | 9–6 | (England) Bath |
| Pen: Paterson (3/3) 2', 32', 62' | Report | Pen: Little (2/3) 21', 30' |

Murrayfield, Edinburgh
Attendance: 5,238
Referee: Romain Poite (France)

20 December 2009
15:00

| Stade Français (France) | 29–16 | (Ireland) Ulster |
| Try: Szarzewski 9' c Kayser 66' c Con: Beauxis (2/2); Pen: Beauxis (5/5) 4', 16', 22', 32', 60' | Report | Try: Trimble 69' c Con: Humphreys (1/1); Pen: Humphreys (3/3) 2', 14', 37' |

Stade Jean-Bouin, Paris
Attendance: 3,700
Referee: Chris White (England)

- This match was originally scheduled to be held at King Baudouin Stadium in Brussels, but heavy snowfall forced it to be moved to Paris.

15 January 2010
20:00

| Ulster (Ireland) | 21–13 | (Scotland) Edinburgh |
| Try: Cave 28' m Boss 55' c Con: Humphreys (1/2); Pen: Humphreys (2/2) 45', 69'; O'Connor (1/1) 80' | Report | Try: Thompson 61' c Con: Paterson (1/1); Pen: Paterson (2/2) 22', 36' |

Ravenhill, Belfast
Attendance: 8,262
Referee: Christophe Berdos (France)

16 January 2010
14:35

| Stade Français (France) | 15–13 | (England) Bath |
| Try: Arias (2) 22' m, 33' c Con: Beauxis (1/2); Pen: Beauxis (1/3) 15' | Report | Try: Claassens 35' c Con: Little (1/1); Pen: Little (2/2) 19', 41' |

Stade Jean-Bouin, Paris
Attendance: 11,800
Referee: Alan Lewis (Ireland)

23 January 2010
15:45

| Bath (England) | 10–28 | (Ireland) Ulster |
| Try: Banahan 20' c Con: Little (1/1); Pen: Little (1/2) 53' | Report | Try: Trimble 42' m Cave 49' c Wallace 77' c Con: O'Connor (2/3); Pen: O'Connor (3/3) 5', 19', 33' |

Recreation Ground, Bath
Attendance: 10,845
Referee: Jérôme Garces (France)

23 January 2010
15:45

| Edinburgh (Scotland) | 9–7 | (France) Stade Français |
| Pen: Paterson (3/5) 11', 36' 45' | Report | Try: Papé 27' c Con: Beauxis (1/1) |

Murrayfield, Edinburgh
Attendance: 3,792
Referee: Wayne Barnes (England)

=== Pool 5 ===
| Team | P | W | D | L | Tries for | Tries against | Try diff | Points for | Points against | Points diff | TB | LB | Pts |
|---|---|---|---|---|---|---|---|---|---|---|---|---|---|
| (France) Toulouse (3) | 6 | 5 | 0 | 1 | 13 | 9 | 4 | 143 | 92 | 51 | 2 | 1 | 23 |
| (Wales) Cardiff Blues [5] | 6 | 4 | 0 | 2 | 14 | 10 | 4 | 149 | 104 | 45 | 1 | 1 | 18 |
| (England) Sale Sharks | 6 | 3 | 0 | 3 | 15 | 16 | −1 | 126 | 153 | −27 | 1 | 1 | 14 |
| (England) Harlequins | 6 | 0 | 0 | 6 | 13 | 20 | −7 | 102 | 171 | −69 | 0 | 2 | 2 |

10 October 2009
13:35

| Cardiff Blues (Wales) | 20–6 | (England) Harlequins |
| Try: James 43' c Halfpenny 79' c Con: Blair (2/2); Pen: Blair (2/3) 3', 19' | Report | Pen: Evans (2/3) 7', 64' |

Cardiff City Stadium, Cardiff
Attendance: 11,127
Referee: Alan Lewis (Ireland)

11 October 2009
16:00

| Toulouse (France) | 36–17 | (England) Sale Sharks |
| Try: Médard 2' c Clerc (2) 13' c, 28' c Donguy (2) 41' m, 67' c Con: Élissalde (3/4); Michalak (1/1); Pen: Élissalde (1/1) 24' | Report | Try: O'Donnell 76' c Cohen 80' c Con: Macleod (2/2); Pen: Macleod (1/1) 5' |

Stadium Municipal, Toulouse
Attendance: 28,534
Referee: George Clancy (Ireland)

16 October 2009
20:00

| Sale Sharks (England) | 27–26 | (Wales) Cardiff Blues |
| Try: Koyamaibole 33' c Schofield 37' c Gaskell 42' c Con: Hodgson (3/3); Pen: Hodgson (1/2) 24'; Drop: Hodgson (1/1) 69' | Report | Try: Powell 49' c Sowden-Taylor 77' c Con: Blair (2/2); Pen: Blair (3/3) 1', 10', 65; Halfpenny (1/3) 29' |

Edgeley Park, Stockport
Attendance: 8,156
Referee: Christophe Berdos (France)

17 October 2009
18:00

| Harlequins (England) | 19–23 | (France) Toulouse |
| Try: Monye (2) 28' m, 54' m Pen: Evans (3/3) 8', 22', 33' | Report | Try: Donguy 45' c Sowerby 49' c Con: Élissalde (2/2); Pen: Élissalde (1/1); Michalak (1/2) 63'; Fritz (1/1) 79' |

Twickenham Stoop Stadium, London
Attendance: 12,032
Referee: Alain Rolland (Ireland)

12 December 2009
15:45

| Cardiff Blues (Wales) | 15–9 | (France) Toulouse |
| Pen: Blair (4/4) 8', 34', 45', 64'; Halfpenny (1/1) 78' | Report | Pen: Fritz (1/3) 53'; Michalak (1/1) 66'; Drop: Skrela (1/3) 71' |

Cardiff City Stadium, Cardiff
Attendance: 10,511
Referee: Peter Fitzgibbon (Ireland)

13 December 2009
12:45

| Harlequins (England) | 19–29 | (England) Sale Sharks |
| Try: Evans 19' c Strettle 35' m Easter 44' m Con: Evans (2/3) | Report | Try: Peel 7' c Macleod 10' c Seymour 21' c Cohen 51' m Con: Hodgson (3/4); Pen: Hodgson (1/2) 40' |

Twickenham Stoop Stadium, London
Attendance: 10,533
Referee: Nigel Owens (Wales)

19 December 2009
14:35

| Toulouse (France) | 23–7 | (Wales) Cardiff Blues |
| Try: Dusautoir 25' m Pen: Michalak (5/6) 12', 45', 60', 69', 76'; Drop: Michalak (1/1) 54' | Report | Try: Filise 30' c Con: Blair (1/1) |

Stadium Municipal, Toulouse
Attendance: 30,530
Referee: Alan Lewis (Ireland)

20 December 2009
15:00

| Sale Sharks (England) | 21–17 | (England) Harlequins |
| Try: Koyamaibole 3' m Roberts 56' c Con: Hodgson (1/1); Pen: Hodgson (3/3) 40', 44' 66' | Report | Try: Evans 7' c Croall 29' c Con: Evans (2/2); Pen: Evans 62' |

Edgeley Park, Stockport
Attendance: 7,764
Referee: George Clancy (Ireland)

16 January 2010
15:45

| Cardiff Blues (Wales) | 36–19 | (England) Sale Sharks |
| Try: Rees 42' c Davies 46' c Rush 80'+2' c Con: Blair (3/3); Pen: Blair (4/4) 3', 21', 34', 55'; Halfpenny (1/3) 30' | Report | Try: Koyamaibole 8' m Tait 49' c Gaskell 78' c Con: Hodgson (2/3) |

Cardiff City Stadium, Cardiff
Attendance: 9,172
Referee: Romain Poite (France)

17 January 2010
16:00

| Toulouse (France) | 33–21 | (England) Harlequins |
| Try: Fritz 36' c Boulihou 48' c Heymans 58' m Médard 65' m Con: Élissalde (2/2); Michalak (0/2); Pen: Élissalde (2) 31', 33' | Report | Try: Brown 22' c Monye (2) 75', 80'; Con: Evans (3/3) |

Stade Ernest-Wallon, Toulouse
Attendance: 17,535
Referee: Nigel Owens (Wales)

24 January 2010
15:00

| Harlequins (England) | 20–45 | (Wales) Cardiff Blues |
| Try: Lowe 1' m Easter 23' m Care 38' c Con: Clegg (1/3); Pen: Clegg (1/1) 10' | Report | Try: G. Thomas 14' c Blair 19' c Sweeney 29' c Rush 33' c Roberts (2) 49' c, 72' c Con: Blair (6/6); Pen: Blair (1/4) 57' |

Twickenham Stoop Stadium, London
Attendance: 10,788
Referee: George Clancy (Ireland)

24 January 2010
15:00

| Sale Sharks (England) | 13–19 | (France) Toulouse |
| Try: Tait 66' c Con: Hodgson (1/1); Pen: Hodgson (2/2) 3', 17' | Report | Try: Lacombe 41' c Con: Élissalde (2) 9', 38'; Pen: Élissalde (2/2) 52', 70' |

Edgeley Park, Stockport
Attendance: 7,820
Referee: Alain Rolland (Ireland)

=== Pool 6 ===
| Team | P | W | D | L | Tries for | Tries against | Try diff | Points for | Points against | Points diff | TB | LB | Pts |
|---|---|---|---|---|---|---|---|---|---|---|---|---|---|
| (Ireland) Leinster (4) | 6 | 4 | 1 | 1 | 19 | 6 | 13 | 154 | 60 | 94 | 3 | 1 | 22 |
| (Wales) Scarlets [7] | 6 | 4 | 0 | 2 | 12 | 20 | −8 | 116 | 147 | −31 | 1 | 0 | 17 |
| (England) London Irish | 6 | 3 | 1 | 2 | 16 | 8 | 8 | 140 | 94 | 46 | 2 | 1 | 17 |
| (France) Brive | 6 | 0 | 0 | 6 | 7 | 20 | −13 | 68 | 177 | −109 | 0 | 1 | 1 |

- Scarlets win the tiebreaker over London Irish by virtue of a head-to-head sweep.

9 October 2009
20:00

| Leinster (Ireland) | 9–12 | (England) London Irish |
| Pen: Sexton (3/3) 2', 11', 74' | Report | Pen: Hodgson (1/1) 9'; Hewat (1/2) 39'; Lamb (2/2) 65', 78' |

RDS Arena, Dublin
Attendance: 18,500
Referee: Romain Poite (France)

10 October 2009
15:00

| Scarlets (Wales) | 24–12 | (France) Brive |
| Tries: Williams 40' m R. Thomas 78' c Con: S. Jones (1/2); Pen: S. Jones (3/6) 4', 21', 53'; Priestland (1/1) 68' | Report | Pen: Goode (3/3) 2', 9', 27'; Orquera (1/1) 55' |

Parc y Scarlets, Pemberton
Attendance: 8,062
Referee: Dave Pearson (England)

17 October 2009
15:00

| London Irish (England) | 25–27 | (Wales) Scarlets |
| Tries: Danaher 7' m Seveali'i 27' c Tagicakibau 67' c Con: Lamb (2/3); Pen: Lamb (1/2) 17'; Drop: Lamb 10' | Report | Tries: Evans 12' c M. Jones 29' c Con: S. Jones (2/2); Pen: S. Jones (5/7) 26', 39', 54', 72', 78' |

Madejski Stadium, Reading
Attendance: 11,947
Referee: Peter Fitzgibbon (Ireland)

17 October 2009
16:45

| Brive (France) | 13–36 | (Ireland) Leinster |
| Try: Vosloo 66' c Con: Goode (1/1); Pen: Goode (2/2) 3', 29' | Report | Tries: Kearney 15' c McLaughlin (2) 68' c, 80' c Con: Sexton (2/2); Berne (1/1); Pen: Sexton (5/5) 9', 24', 34', 40', 42' |

Stade Amédée-Domenech, Brive-la-Gaillarde
Attendance: 11,300
Referee: James Jones (Wales)

12 December 2009
18:00

| Scarlets (Wales) | 7–32 | (Ireland) Leinster |
| Try: Davies 46' c Con: S. Jones (1/1) | Report | Tries: Horgan 4' c D'Arcy 24 c Berne 29' m O'Brien 72' c Con: Berne (3/4); Pen: Berne (2/2) 19', 56' |

Parc y Scarlets, Pemberton
Attendance: 9,012
Referee: Chris White (England)

12 December 2009
19:00

| Brive (France) | 3–36 | (England) London Irish |
| Pen: Palisson (1/1) 40' | Report | Tries: Malone 5' c Homer (2) 19' m, 78' c S. Armitage 49' c Thorpe 69' c Con: Malone (3/4); Lamb (1/1); Pen: Malone (1/1) 37' |

Stade Amédée-Domenech, Brive-la-Gaillarde
Attendance: 9,000
Referee: George Clancy (Ireland)

19 December 2009
15:00

| London Irish (England) | 34–13 | (France) Brive |
| Tries: Homer 10' c, Mapusua 33' c, Seveali'i 59' c D. Armitage 80' c Con: Malone (3/3); Lamb (1/1); Pen: Malone (2 ) 17', 29' | Report | Tries: Namy 77' c Con: Orquera (1/1); Pen: Orquera (2) 13' 15' |

Madejski Stadium, Reading
Attendance: 9,275
Referee: James Jones (Wales)

19 December 2009
15:45

| Leinster (Ireland) | 39–7 | (Wales) Scarlets |
| Tries: Kearney (2) 5' m, 22' m Horgan 38'; D'Arcy (2) 46'c, 58' c O'Driscoll (2) 56' m, 72'm Con: Berne (2/7) | Report | Try: Priestlend 66' c Con: S. Jones (1/1) |

RDS Arena, Dublin
Attendance: 18,500
Referee: Wayne Barnes (England)

16 January 2010
18:00

| Leinster (Ireland) | 27– 10 | (France) Brive |
| Try: Penalty try 26' c Nacewa 45' m D'Arcy 67' c O'Driscoll 80' m Con: Sexton (2/4); Pen: Sexton (1/1) 43' | Report | Try: Uys 60' m Spedding 76' m Con: Agulla (2/2); Pen: Orquera (0/1) |

RDS Arena, Dublin
Attendance: 17,836
Referee: Andrew Small (England)

17 January 2010
12:45

| Scarlets (Wales) | 31–22 | (England) London Irish |
| Try: Davies (2) 9' c, 80' c McCusker (2) 62' c, 67' c Con: Priestland (4/4); Pen: Priestland (1/5) 39' | Report | Try: Homer 3' m Paice 15' c Hala'ufia 50' c Con: Lamb (2/3); Pen: Lamb (1/1) 29' |

Parc y Scarlets, Pemberton
Attendance: 7,017
Referee: Jérôme Garces (France)

23 January 2010
19:00

| Brive (France) | 17–20 | (Wales) Scarlets |
| Try: Bonrepaux 19' m Agulla 24' m Cooke 58' c Con: Orquera (1/3) | Report | Try: Welch 36' c Stoddart 46' c Con: S. Jones (2/2); Pen: S. Jones (2) 28', 64' |

Stade Amédée-Domenech, Brive-la-Gaillarde
Attendance: 7,000
Referee: Peter Fitzgibbon (Ireland)

23 January 2010
18:00

| London Irish (England) | 11–11 | (Ireland) Leinster |
| Try: Malone 65' m Pen: Malone (2/4) 34', 77' | Report | Try: Nacewa 37' m Pen: Sexton (1/2) 4'; Drop: Sexton 78' |

Twickenham, London
Attendance: 37,323
Referee: Nigel Owens (Wales)

=== Seeding and runners-up ===
- Bare numbers indicate Heineken Cup quarter-final seeding.
- Numbers with "C" indicate Challenge Cup quarter-final seeding.

| Seed | Pool Winners | Pts | TF | +/− |
|---|---|---|---|---|
| 1 | (Ireland) Munster | 24 | 19 | +91 |
| 2 | (France) Biarritz | 23 | 19 | +91 |
| 3 | (France) Toulouse | 23 | 14 | +51 |
| 4 | (Ireland) Leinster | 22 | 19 | +94 |
| 5 | (France) Clermont | 21 | 24 | +81 |
| 6 | (France) Stade Français | 18 | 11 | +29 |
| Seed | Pool Runners-up | Pts | TF | +/− |
| 7 | (Wales) Ospreys | 20 | 17 | +67 |
| 8 | (England) Northampton | 19 | 16 | +34 |
| 5C | (Wales) Cardiff Blues | 18 | 14 | +45 |
| 6C | (England) Gloucester | 17 | 12 | −10 |
| 7C | (Wales) Scarlets | 17 | 12 | −29 |
| – | (Ireland) Ulster | 17 | 11 | +33 |

== See also ==
- 2009-10 Heineken Cup
