= Dulla =

Dulla may refer to:

- Dulla (organ), a pink organ in the throats of camels, displayed out of the mouth during courtship
- Dulla, Bangladesh, a populated place in Bangladesh
- Dulla Bhatti, a Punjabi fighter
- Goth Dulla Lakhan, a village in Pakistan

== See also ==
- Dullah, a village in Pakistan
- Dullar, an Indian clan
- Dula
- Doula
