= 2009–10 Celtic League =

- Countries: Ireland; Scotland; Wales
- Date: 4 September 2009 – 29 May 2010
- Champions: (Wales) Ospreys (3rd title)
- Runners-up: (Ireland) Leinster
- Matches played: 93
- Attendance: 818,181 (average 8,798 per match)
- Tries scored: 333 (average 3.6 per match)
- Top point scorer: Dan Parks (Glasgow) (216 points)
- Top try scorer: Tim Visser (Edinburgh) (10 tries)

Official website
- www.rabodirectpro12.com

The 2009–10 Celtic League (known as the 2009–10 Magners League for sponsorship reasons) was the ninth season of the league now known as Pro12 and the fourth with Magners as title sponsor. The season began in September 2009 and ended with the Grand Final on 29 May 2010. Ten teams played each other on a home-and-away basis, with teams earning four points for a win, two points for a draw and a bonus point for scoring four or more tries in a match. The losing team may also earn a bonus point if they lose by seven points or less.

The ten teams competing consisted of the four Irish provinces, Munster, Leinster, Connacht and Ulster; two Scottish regions, Edinburgh Rugby and Glasgow Warriors; and four Welsh regions, Cardiff Blues, Newport Gwent Dragons, Ospreys and Scarlets.

This season saw the introduction of a play-off structure similar to the English Premiership in order to determine the overall winner. The Ospreys won the final, defeating Leinster 17–12 in Dublin.

== Teams ==
Location of 2009–10 Celtic League teams in Great Britain and Ireland.
Winners; 2nd–4th place; Other teams.

Team	Coach	Captain	Stadium	Capacity
(Wales) Cardiff Blues	(Wales) Dai Young	(New Zealand) Paul Tito	Cardiff City Stadium	26,828
(Ireland) Connacht	(Ireland) Michael Bradley	(Ireland) John Muldoon	Galway Sportsgrounds	7,000
(Scotland) Edinburgh	(Scotland) Rob Moffat	(Scotland) Mike Blair	Murrayfield Stadium	12,464 (Note: Although Murrayfield's full capacity is 67,144, only the lower section of the West Stand, with a capacity of 12,464, is generally opened for Edinburgh fixtures.)
(Scotland) Glasgow Warriors	(Scotland) Sean Lineen	(Scotland) Alastair Kellock	Firhill Stadium	10,887
(Ireland) Leinster	(Australia) Michael Cheika	(Ireland) Leo Cullen	RDS Arena	18,500
(Ireland) Munster	(Australia) Tony McGahan	(Ireland) Paul O'Connell	Thomond Park; Musgrave Park	26,500; 8,300
(Wales) Newport Gwent Dragons	(Wales) Paul Turner	(New Zealand) Tom Willis	Rodney Parade	11,700
(Wales) Ospreys	(Australia) Scott Johnson	(Wales) Ryan Jones	Liberty Stadium	20,520
(Wales) Scarlets	(Wales) Nigel Davies	(Wales) Mark Jones	Parc y Scarlets	14,870
(Ireland) Ulster	(Ireland) Brian McLaughlin	(Ireland) Rory Best	Ravenhill	12,125

== Table ==
	Team	Pld	W	D	L	PF	PA	PD	TF	TA	Try bonus	Losing bonus	Pts
1	(Ireland) Leinster	18	13	0	5	359	295	+64	27	29	1	2	55
2	(Wales) Ospreys	18	11	1	6	384	298	+86	37	26	3	3	52
3	(Scotland) Glasgow Warriors	18	11	2	5	390	321	+69	31	24	2	1	51
4	(Ireland) Munster	18	9	0	9	319	282	+37	33	20	3	6	45
5	(Wales) Cardiff Blues	18	10	0	8	349	315	+34	33	28	2	2	44
6	(Scotland) Edinburgh	18	8	0	10	385	391	−6	40	40	4	5	41
7	(Wales) Newport Gwent Dragons	18	8	1	9	333	378	−45	32	37	3	2	39
8	(Ireland) Ulster	18	7	1	10	357	370	−13	39	35	4	2	36
9	(Wales) Scarlets	18	5	0	13	361	382	−21	35	35	1	8	29
10	(Ireland) Connacht	18	5	1	12	254	459	−205	20	53	0	4	26
Under the standard bonus point system, points are awarded as follows: 4 points for a win; 2 points for a draw; 1 bonus point for scoring 4 tries (or more) (Try bonus); 1 bonus point for losing by 7 points (or fewer) (Losing bonus)
Green background (rows 1 to 4) are play-off places. Source: RaboDirect PRO12

== Regular season results ==
=== Round 1 ===
4 September 2009
19:00

Connacht (Ireland)	12–19	(Wales) Ospreys
	Report

Sportsgrounds
Attendance: 1,982
Referee: Graham Knox

4 September 2009
19:05

Cardiff Blues (Wales)	21–22	(Scotland) Edinburgh
	Report

Cardiff City Stadium
Attendance: 8,124
Referee: Peter Fitzgibbon

4 September 2009
20:00

Glasgow Warriors (Scotland)	22–9	(Ireland) Munster
	Report

Firhill Stadium
Attendance: 3,694
Referee: James Jones

5 September 2009
18:30

Scarlets (Wales)	18–16	(Ireland) Leinster
	Report

Parc y Scarlets
Attendance: 6,075
Referee: Neil Paterson

6 September 2009
14:05

Newport Gwent Dragons (Wales)	23–6	(Ireland) Ulster
	Report

Rodney Parade
Attendance: 4,561
Referee: Carlo Damasco

=== Round 2 ===
11 September 2009
19:05

Munster (Ireland)	24–13	(Wales) Cardiff Blues
	Report

Thomond Park
Attendance: 19,752
Referee: Peter Allan

11 September 2009
19:30

Edinburgh (Scotland)	62–13	(Ireland) Connacht
	Report

Murrayfield
Attendance: 3,042
Referee: James Jones

12 September 2009
18:30

Ospreys (Wales)	16–20	(Ireland) Ulster
	Report

Liberty Stadium
Attendance: 7,072
Referee: Alan Lewis

12 September 2009
19:00

Leinster (Ireland)	23–14	(Wales) Newport Gwent Dragons
	Report

RDS Arena
Attendance: 15,145
Referee: Graham Knox

13 September 2009
17:05

Glasgow Warriors (Scotland)	19–11	(Wales) Scarlets
	Report

Firhill Stadium
Attendance: 2,582
Referee: John Lacey

=== Round 3 ===
18 September 2009
19:00

Connacht (Ireland)	18–16	(Wales) Cardiff Blues
	Report

Sportsgrounds
Attendance: 1,425
Referee: Neil Paterson

18 September 2009
19:05

Ospreys (Wales)	11–18	(Ireland) Leinster
	Report

Liberty Stadium
Attendance: 7,182
Referee: Peter Allan

18 September 2009
19:30

Newport Gwent Dragons (Wales)	30–19	(Scotland) Glasgow Warriors
	Report

Rodney Parade
Attendance: 5,219
Referee: Dudley Phillips

18 September 2009
20:00

Ulster (Ireland)	13–16	(Scotland) Edinburgh
	Report

Ravenhill
Attendance: 8,899
Referee: Nigel Owens

19 September 2009
18:30

Scarlets (Wales)	20–22	(Ireland) Munster
	Report

Parc y Scarlets
Attendance: 6,313
Referee: Alain Rolland

=== Round 4 ===
25 September 2009
19:05

Glasgow Warriors (Scotland)	16–26	(Wales) Ospreys
	Report

Firhill Stadium
Attendance: 3,108
Referee: Simon McDowell

25 September 2009
20:00

Connacht (Ireland)	6–30	(Ireland) Ulster
	Report

Sportsgrounds
Attendance: 2,435
Referee: George Clancy

26 September 2009
18:30

Cardiff Blues (Wales)	19–15	(Wales) Scarlets
	Report

Cardiff City Stadium
Attendance: 12,198
Referee: Andrew Small

26 September 2009
18:30

Edinburgh (Scotland)	19–21	(Ireland) Leinster
	Report

Murrayfield
Attendance: 5,761
Referee: Tim Hayes

27 September 2009
17:05

Munster (Ireland)	27–3	(Wales) Newport Gwent Dragons
	Report

Musgrave Park, Cork
Attendance: 8,685
Referee: Neil Paterson

=== Round 5 ===
2 October 2009
19:05

Ulster (Ireland)	45–24	(Wales) Scarlets
	Report

Ravenhill
Attendance: 8,141
Referee: Peter Allan

3 October 2009
16:30

Newport Gwent Dragons (Wales)	23–10	(Ireland) Connacht
	Report

Rodney Parade
Attendance: 5,331
Referee: Peter Fitzgibbon

3 October 2009
18:30

Cardiff Blues (Wales)	5–21	(Scotland) Glasgow Warriors
	Report

Cardiff City Stadium
Attendance: 9,185
Referee: George Clancy

3 October 2009
18:30

Leinster (Ireland)	30–0	(Ireland) Munster
	Report

RDS Arena
Attendance: 18,500
Referee: Simon McDowell

4 October 2009
16:00

Ospreys (Wales)	31–10	(Scotland) Edinburgh
	Report

Liberty Stadium
Attendance: 7,033
Referee: John Lacey

=== Round 6 ===
23 October 2009
19:05

Scarlets (Wales)	18–3	(Wales) Newport Gwent Dragons
	Report

Parc y Scarlets
Attendance: 6,464
Referee: Peter Allan

23 October 2009
19:30

Glasgow Warriors (Scotland)	34–20	(Ireland) Connacht
	Report

Firhill Stadium
Attendance: 2,887
Referee: Tim Hayes

23 October 2009
20:00

Edinburgh (Scotland)	12–7	(Ireland) Munster
	Report

Murrayfield
Attendance: 5,426
Referee: Gwyn Morris

24 October 2009
18:00

Ulster (Ireland)	16–14	(Ireland) Leinster
	Report

Ravenhill
Attendance: 11,523
Referee: Andrew Small

24 October 2009
18:30

Cardiff Blues (Wales)	20–12	(Wales) Ospreys
	Report

Cardiff City Stadium
Attendance: 16,341
Referee: Nigel Owens

=== Round 7 ===
30 October 2009
18:30

Connacht (Ireland)	16–10	(Wales) Scarlets
	Report

Sportsgrounds
Attendance: 1,756
Referee: Graham Knox

30 October 2009
19:05

Ospreys (Wales)	9–9	(Scotland) Glasgow Warriors
	Report

Liberty Stadium
Attendance: 6,661
Referee: Peter Fitzgibbon

31 October 2009
17:00

Munster (Ireland)	24–10	(Ireland) Ulster
	Report

Thomond Park
Attendance: 23,298
Referee: Alain Rolland

31 October 2009
18:30

Leinster (Ireland)	23–6	(Wales) Cardiff Blues
	Report

RDS Arena
Attendance: 15,910
Referee: James Jones

1 November 2009
17:05

Edinburgh (Scotland)	8–9	(Wales) Newport Gwent Dragons
	Report

Murrayfield
Attendance: 2,066
Referee: Alan Lewis

=== Round 8 ===
4 December 2009
19:05

Scarlets (Wales)	16–17	(Scotland) Edinburgh
	Report

Parc y Scarlets
Attendance: 5,540
Referee: Carlo Damasco

4 December 2009
20:00

Ulster (Ireland)	13–25	(Scotland) Glasgow Warriors
	Report

Ravenhill
Attendance: 8,761
Referee: James Jones

5 December 2009
18:30

Ospreys (Wales)	19–14	(Ireland) Munster
	Report

Liberty Stadium
Attendance: 8,077
Referee: Neil Paterson

6 December 2009
15:00

Cardiff Blues (Wales)	21–9	(Ireland) Connacht
	Report

Cardiff City Stadium
Attendance: 7,105
Referee: Andy Macpherson

6 December 2009
17:05

Newport Gwent Dragons (Wales)	30–14	(Ireland) Leinster
	Report

Rodney Parade
Attendance: 5,437
Referee: Simon McDowell

=== Round 9 ===
26 December 2009
14:05

Scarlets (Wales)	14–21	(Wales) Ospreys
	Report

Parc y Scarlets
Attendance: 14,739
Referee: Nigel Owens

26 December 2009
17:30

Leinster (Ireland)	15–3	(Ireland) Ulster
	Report

RDS Arena
Attendance: 18,140
Referee: George Clancy

26 December 2009
19:30

Munster (Ireland)	35–3	(Ireland) Connacht
	Report

Thomond Park
Attendance: 25,291
Referee: Alain Rolland

27 December 2009
18:00

Cardiff Blues (Wales)	42–13	(Wales) Newport Gwent Dragons
	Report

Cardiff City Stadium
Attendance: 15,210
Referee: James Jones

==== 1872 Cup 1st round ====
27 December 2009
15:05

Glasgow Warriors (Scotland)	25–12	(Scotland) Edinburgh
	Report

Firhill Stadium
Attendance: 8,830
Referee: Neil Paterson

=== Round 10 ===
31 December 2009
14:05

Newport Gwent Dragons (Wales)	9–14	(Wales) Scarlets
	Report

Rodney Parade
Attendance: 6,429
Referee: Nigel Owens

1 January 2010
17:15

Ospreys (Wales)	26–0	(Wales) Cardiff Blues
	Report

Liberty Stadium
Attendance: 14,476
Referee: James Jones

2 January 2010
16:00

Connacht (Ireland)	P–P	(Ireland) Leinster

Sportsgrounds
Referee: Peter Fitzgibbon

2 January 2010
18:00

Ulster (Ireland)	15–10	(Ireland) Munster
	Report

Ravenhill
Attendance: 11,800
Referee: Dudley Phillips

==== 1872 Cup 2nd round ====
2 January 2010
15:05

Edinburgh (Scotland)	15–22	(Scotland) Glasgow Warriors
	Report

Murrayfield
Attendance: 11,785
Referee: Peter Allan

=== Round 11 ===
8 January 2010
18:30

Connacht (Ireland)	P–P	(Wales) Newport Gwent Dragons

Sportsgrounds
Referee: Andy Macpherson

8 January 2010
19:05

Ulster (Ireland)	P–P	(Wales) Ospreys

Ravenhill
Referee: Nigel Owens

8 January 2010
20:00

Leinster (Ireland)	P–P	(Scotland) Glasgow Warriors

RDS Arena
Referee: James Jones

9 January 2010
18:30

Edinburgh (Scotland)	21–12	(Wales) Cardiff Blues
	Report

Murrayfield
Attendance: 1,569
Referee: John Lacey

10 January 2010
17:00

Munster (Ireland)	P–P	(Wales) Scarlets

Musgrave Park
Referee: Neil Paterson

=== Round 12 ===
19 February 2010
19:05

Ulster (Ireland)	22–22	(Wales) Newport Gwent Dragons
	Report

Ravenhill
Attendance: 7,909
Referee: Peter Allan

19 February 2010
19:30

Glasgow Warriors (Scotland)	7–30	(Wales) Cardiff Blues
	Report

Firhill Stadium
Attendance: 2,754
Referee: Dudley Phillips

19 February 2010
20:00

Munster (Ireland)	19–12	(Scotland) Edinburgh
	Report

Musgrave Park
Attendance: 8,500
Referee: Tim Hayes

20 February 2010
18:30

Leinster (Ireland)	27–14	(Wales) Scarlets
	Report

RDS Arena
Attendance: 13,890
Referee: Andy Macpherson

21 February 2010
17:00

Ospreys (Wales)	19–17	(Ireland) Connacht
	Report

Liberty Stadium
Attendance: 5,053
Referee: Neil Patterson

=== Round 13 ===
5 March 2010
19:05

Scarlets (Wales)	25–8	(Ireland) Ulster
	Report

Parc y Scarlets
Attendance: 6,266
Referee: Peter Allan

5 March 2010
20:00

Connacht (Ireland)	19–19	(Scotland) Glasgow Warriors
	Report

Sportsgrounds
Attendance: 1,412
Referee: James Jones

6 March 2010
18:30

Newport Gwent Dragons (Wales)	31–22	(Ireland) Munster
	Report

Rodney Parade
Attendance: 6,137
Referee: Dudley Phillips

7 March 2010
14:00

Edinburgh (Scotland)	33–17	(Wales) Ospreys
	Report

Murrayfield
Attendance: 2,329
Referee: George Clancy

7 March 2010
16:00

Cardiff Blues (Wales)	20–29	(Ireland) Leinster
	Report

Cardiff City Stadium
Attendance: 9,384
Referee: Andy Macpherson

=== Rearranged fixtures ===
17 March 2010
18:30

Connacht (Ireland)	16–3	(Wales) Newport Gwent Dragons
	Report

Sportsgrounds
Attendance: 1,485
Referee: Andy Macpherson

18 March 2010
19:30

Leinster (Ireland)	20–14	(Scotland) Glasgow Warriors
	Report

RDS Arena
Attendance: 11,840
Referee: Nigel Owens

18 March 2010
19:10

Munster (Ireland)	23–17	(Wales) Scarlets
	Report

Musgrave Park
Attendance: 8,200
Referee: Neil Paterson

19 March 2010
18:10

Ulster (Ireland)	P–P	(Wales) Ospreys

Ravenhill

=== Round 14 ===
26 March 2010
19:05

Cardiff Blues (Wales)	19–9	(Ireland) Ulster
	Report

Cardiff City Stadium
Attendance: 7,532
Referee: Neil Patterson

26 March 2010
19:30

Edinburgh (Scotland)	24–20	(Wales) Scarlets
	Report

Murrayfield
Attendance: 2,762
Referee: Peter Fitzgibbon

26 March 2010
20:00

Munster (Ireland)	27–19	(Scotland) Glasgow Warriors
	Report

Thomond Park
Attendance: 23,814
Referee: James Jones

27 March 2010
16:30

Leinster (Ireland)	17–14	(Ireland) Connacht
	Report

RDS Arena
Attendance: 13,835
Referee: Jérôme Garces

27 March 2010
19:05

Newport Gwent Dragons (Wales)	28–20	(Wales) Ospreys
	Report

Rodney Parade
Attendance: 7,121
Referee: Nigel Owens

=== Round 15 ===
2 April 2010
18:00

Connacht (Ireland)	22–21	(Scotland) Edinburgh
	Report

Sportsgrounds
Attendance: 1,460
Referee: Leighton Hodges

2 April 2010
19:05

Ospreys (Wales)	27–19	(Wales) Scarlets
	Report

Liberty Stadium
Attendance: 13,913
Referee: Christophe Berdos

2 April 2010
20:05

Munster (Ireland)	15–16	(Ireland) Leinster
	Report

Thomond Park
Attendance: 25,623
Referee: Romain Poite

3 April 2010
19:30

Ulster (Ireland)	24–33	(Wales) Cardiff Blues
	Report

Ravenhill
Attendance: 7,334
Referee: Andy Macpherson

4 April 2010
15:05

Glasgow Warriors (Scotland)	27–19	(Wales) Newport Gwent Dragons
	Report

Firhill Stadium
Attendance: 2,621
Referee: Alan Lewis

=== Rearranged fixture ===
13 April 2010
19:30

Ulster (Ireland)	27–38	(Wales) Ospreys
	Report

Ravenhill
Attendance: 7,649
Referee: Neil Paterson

=== Round 16 ===
16 April 2010
19:05

Glasgow Warriors (Scotland)	25–18	(Ireland) Ulster
	Report

Firhill Stadium
Attendance: 3,766
Referee: Tim Hayes

16 April 2010
19:05

Leinster (Ireland)	20–16	(Wales) Ospreys
	Report

RDS Arena
Attendance: 15,836
Referee: Peter Allan

17 April 2010
18:30

Scarlets (Wales)	16–39	(Wales) Cardiff Blues
	Report

Parc y Scarlets
Attendance: 10,171
Referee: Nigel Owens

18 April 2010
17:05

Connacht (Ireland)	12–18	(Ireland) Munster
	Report

Sportsgrounds
Attendance: 4,125
Referee: Alain Rolland

18 April 2010
17:05

Newport Gwent Dragons (Wales)	49–28	(Scotland) Edinburgh
	Report

Rodney Parade
Attendance: 7,142
Referee: James Jones

=== Rearranged fixture ===
21 April 2010
19:45

Connacht (Ireland)	27–13	(Ireland) Leinster
	Report

Sportsgrounds
Attendance: 3,250
Referee: Peter Fitzgibbon

=== Round 17 ===
23 April 2010
19:05

Newport Gwent Dragons (Wales)	14–20	(Wales) Cardiff Blues
	Report

Rodney Parade
Attendance: 8,108
Referee: Peter Allan

23 April 2010
20:00

Glasgow Warriors (Scotland)	30–6	(Ireland) Leinster
	Report

Firhill Stadium
Attendance: 4,638
Referee: James Jones

24 April 2010
18:30

Munster (Ireland)	11–15	(Wales) Ospreys
	Report

Thomond Park
Attendance: 24,112
Referee: Neil Paterson

25 April 2010
14:05

Scarlets (Wales)	58–10	(Ireland) Connacht
	Report

Parc y Scarlets
Attendance: 5,023
Referee: Andy Macpherson

25 April 2010
16:05

Edinburgh (Scotland)	25–37	(Ireland) Ulster
	Report

Murrayfield
Attendance: 3,759
Referee: Nigel Owens

=== Round 18 ===
7 May 2010
19:05

Ospreys (Wales)	42–10	(Wales) Newport Gwent Dragons
	Report

Liberty Stadium
Attendance: 8,004
Referee: Nigel Owens

7 May 2010
19:05

Scarlets (Wales)	32–37	(Scotland) Glasgow Warriors
	Report

Parc y Scarlets
Attendance: 5,630
Referee: James Jones

7 May 2010
19:30

Ulster (Ireland)	41–10	(Ireland) Connacht
	Report

Ravenhill
Attendance: 7,755
Referee: Dudley Phillips

9 May 2010
18:15

Cardiff Blues (Wales)	13–12	(Ireland) Munster
	Report

Cardiff City Stadium
Attendance: 12,602
Referee: Peter Allan

9 May 2010
18:15

Leinster (Ireland)	37–28	(Scotland) Edinburgh
	Report

RDS Arena
Attendance: 11,836
Referee: James Jones

== Playoffs ==
=== Semi-finals ===
14 May 2010
19:05

Ospreys (Wales)	20–5	(Scotland) Glasgow Warriors
Try: Williams 9' c Hook 54' c Con: Biggar (2/2); Pen: Biggar (2) 51', 79'	Report	Try: Thomson 42' m

Liberty Stadium
Attendance: 7,079
Referee: George Clancy

15 May 2010
20:00

Leinster (Ireland)	16–6	(Ireland) Munster
Try: Kearney 44' c Con: Sexton; Pen: Sexton (3) 18', 50', 58'	Report	Pen: O'Gara 29'; Drop: O'Gara 41'

RDS Arena
Attendance: 19,750
Referee: Nigel Owens

=== Grand Final ===
29 May 2010
18:30

Leinster (Ireland)	12–17	(Wales) Ospreys
Pen: Sexton (4) 23', 45', 62' ,71'	Report	Try: Bowe 20' c Byrne 35' c Con: Biggar (2/2); Pen: Biggar 48'

RDS Arena
Attendance: 19,500
Referee: Chris White

== Leading scorers ==
Note: Flags to the left of player names indicate national team as has been defined under IRB eligibility rules, or primary nationality for players who have not yet earned international senior caps. Players may hold one or more non-IRB nationalities.

=== Top points scorers ===
Rank	Player	Club	Points
1	(Scotland) Dan Parks	(Scotland) Glasgow Warriors	216
2	(Wales) Dan Biggar	(Wales) Ospreys	205
3	(New Zealand) Ben Blair	(Wales) Cardiff Blues	150
4	(Ireland) Ian Keatley	(Ireland) Connacht	138
5	(Ireland) Johnny Sexton	(Ireland) Leinster	136

=== Top try scorers ===
Rank	Player	Club	Tries
1	(Netherlands) Tim Visser	(Scotland) Edinburgh	10
2	(Ireland) Tommy Bowe	(Wales) Ospreys	8
2	(Scotland) Simon Danielli	(Ireland) Ulster	8
4	(Ireland) Fionn Carr	(Ireland) Connacht	7
5	(Wales) Aled Brew	(Wales) Newport Gwent Dragons	6
