= Vivalda =

Vivalda is both a surname and a given name. Notable people with the name include:

- Lorenzo Vivalda (1890–1945), Italian general
- Yohann Vivalda (born 1988), French rugby union player
- Vivalda Dula, Angolan singer-songwriter and percussionist
