= Dula =

Dula is a name. Notable people with the name include:

- Arthur M. Dula (born 1947) American lawyer and patent attorney
- Lishan Dula (born 1987), long-distance runner for Bahrain
- Louis Dula (born 1912), American Negro leagues baseball pitcher
- Tom Dula (1845–1868), Confederate soldier
- Vivalda Dula, Angolan singer-songwriter and percussionist
- Dula Bhaya Kag (1902–1977), Indian poet, songwriter, writer and artist
- Đula Mešter (born 1972), Serbian volleyball player of Hungarian ethnicity
- Ðula Sabo (fl. 1928), Yugoslav wrestler

== See also ==
- Doula, an assistant providing non-medical support during and after childbirth
- Dulas (disambiguation)
- Dula-Horton Cemetery, historic cemetery in North Carolina
