= Dulas =

Dulas may refer to:

== Places ==
- Dulas, Anglesey, Wales
  - Dulas Bay, nearby
- Dulas, Herefordshire, England

== Rivers ==
- Afon Dulas, two rivers (North Dulas and South Dulas), tributaries of the Afon Dyfi in Mid Wales
- Afon Dulas, Llanidloes, a headwater tributary of the River Severn, in Powys, Wales
- Dulas, Irfon, a left-bank tributary of the Afon Irfon, in Powys, Wales
- Dulas, Ithon, a minor right-bank tributary of the River Ithon, in Powys, Wales
- River Dulas, a tributary of the River Teifi, in West Wales
- Afon Dulas, Llanddulas, North Wales

== Other uses ==
- Dulas of Cilicia, a Christian Saint during the Roman Empire
