= 2012 Pro12 Grand Final =

Rugby union match

- Event: 2011–12 Pro12
Leinster	Ospreys
(Ireland)	(Wales)
30	31
- Date: 27 May 2012
- Venue: RDS Arena, Dublin
- Referee: Romain Poite (France)
- Attendance: 18,500
- Weather: Sunny

The 2012 Pro12 Grand Final was the final match of the 2011–12 Pro12 season. The 2011–12 season was the first with RaboDirect as title sponsor and the third ever Celtic League Grand Final. Ospreys won the game 31–30 against Leinster.

Shane Williams scored a 78th minute try in the corner for the Ospreys which Dan Biggar converted to seal victory by one point.

== Route to the final ==
=== 2011–12 final table ===
Pro12 Table
Pos	Team	Pld	W	D	L	PF	PA	PD	TF	TA	TB	LB	Pts	Qualification (Note: Qualification for the Heineken Cup is based on each country's allocation, i.e. three highest-ranked Irish teams, three highest-ranked Welsh teams, both Italian teams and both Scottish teams. Because Leinster won the 2012 Heineken Cup Final, Ireland earned an extra Heineken Cup place, which will go to Connacht. Aironi were denied a licence for the 2012–13 season due to financial issues; the newly established Zebre side replaced Aironi in the Pro12 and Heineken Cup.)
1	(Ireland) Leinster (F)	22	18	1	3	568	326	+242	48	28	5	2	81	Play-off place
2	(Wales) Ospreys (C)	22	16	1	5	491	337	+154	44	22	2	3	71	Play-off place
3	(Ireland) Munster (SF)	22	14	1	7	489	367	+122	45	27	5	4	67	Play-off place
4	(Scotland) Glasgow Warriors (SF)	22	13	4	5	445	321	+124	34	23	2	3	65	Play-off place
5	(Wales) Scarlets	22	12	2	8	446	373	+73	43	30	5	5	62	
6	(Ireland) Ulster	22	12	0	10	474	424	+50	53	41	5	3	56	
7	(Wales) Cardiff Blues	22	10	0	12	446	460	−14	43	45	5	5	50	
8	(Ireland) Connacht	22	7	1	14	321	433	−112	27	36	0	7	37	
9	(Wales) Newport Gwent Dragons	22	7	1	14	370	474	−104	27	41	1	5	36	
10	(Italy) Benetton Treviso	22	7	0	15	419	558	−139	41	57	3	5	36	
11	(Scotland) Edinburgh	22	6	1	15	454	588	−134	42	65	2	4	32	
12	(Italy) Aironi	22	4	0	18	289	551	−262	22	54	1	5	22	

Updated to match(es) played on 5 May 2012. Source: RaboDirect PRO12
Rules for classification: If teams are level at any stage, tiebreakers are applied in the following order:
1. number of matches won;
2. the difference between points for and points against;
3. the number of tries scored;
4. the most points scored;
5. the difference between tries for and tries against;
6. the fewest red cards received;
7. the fewest yellow cards received.
  (C) Champions; (F) Lost in the final; (SF) Lost in the semi-finals
  Notes:

=== Play-offs ===
11 May 2012
19:35

Ospreys (Wales)	45–10	(Ireland) Munster
Try: Biggar 12' c Fotuali'i 40' c Dirksen 55' m Bishop 63' c Webb 71' c Con: Biggar (4/5); Pen: Biggar (4/4) 8', 22', 30', 49'	Report	Try: Keatley 3' c Con: Keatley (1/1); Pen: Keatley (1/1) 20'

Liberty Stadium, Swansea
Attendance: 10,026
Referee: Alain Rolland

12 May 2012
19:35

Leinster (Ireland)	19–15	(Scotland) Glasgow Warriors
Try: D. Kearney 66' c Con: Sexton (1/1); Pen: Sexton (4/4) 7', 23', 38', 63'	Report	Try: Hall 77' m Hogg 80' c Con: Jackson (1/2); Pen: Weir (1/3) 9'

RDS Arena, Dublin
Attendance: 15,113
Referee: George Clancy

== Match ==
=== Details ===
27 May 2012
16:00

Leinster (Ireland)	30–31	(Wales) Ospreys
Try: Cronin 26' c Nacewa (2) 35' c, 61' c Con: Sexton (3/3); Pen: Sexton (3/4) 11', 44', 51'	Report	Try: Beck 42' c Williams (2) 59' m, 78' c Con: Biggar (2/3); Pen: Biggar (4/4) 8', 22', 34', 73'

RDS Arena, Dublin
Attendance: 18,500
Referee: Romain Poite
