= Wobeon Music Festival =

The Wobeon Music Festival (World Beat Online, also known as Wobeon Fest) is a music festival held in Austin, Texas, United States. It is held annually.

The Festival has featured musicians from over 75 countries since it began in 2011.

The festival was founded by Jakes Srinivasan.

== Featured performers ==
Performers at the festival have included:

- Vivalda Dula
