= Dulas of Cilicia =

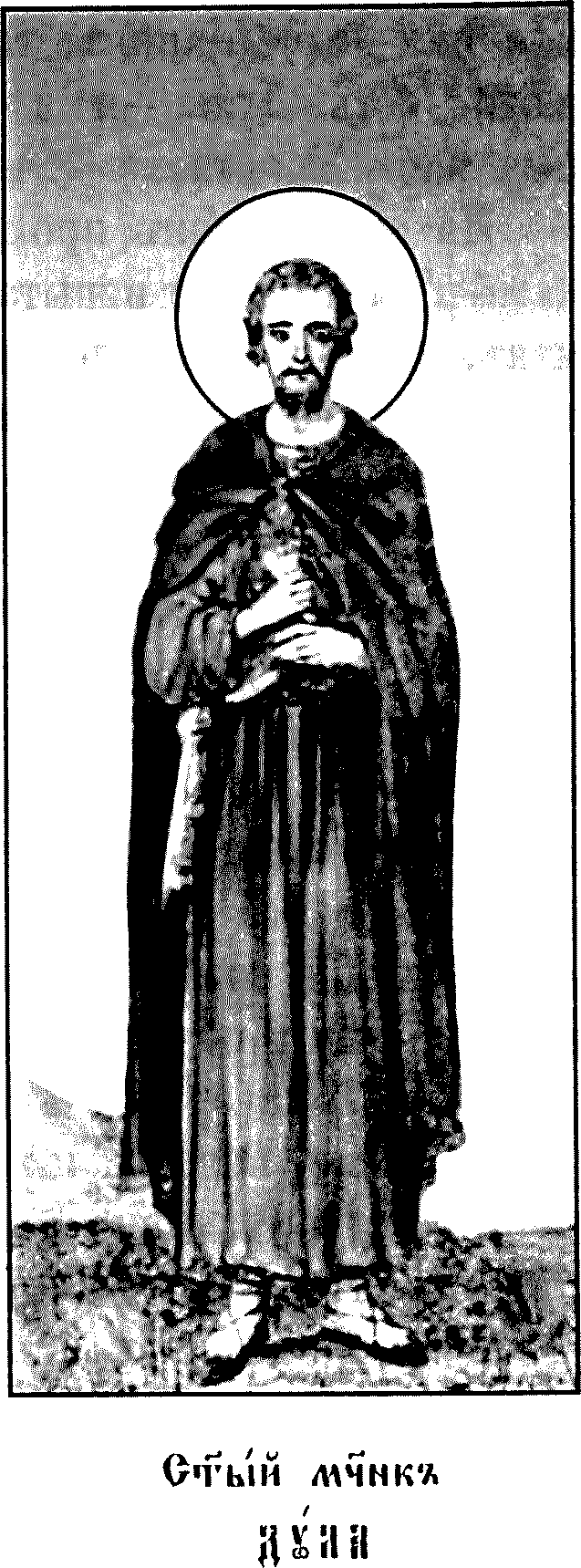

Saint Dulas was a Christian Saint during the Roman Empire.

At Zephirium, in Cilicia, St. Dulas, martyr, who, under the governor Maximus, was, for the name of Christ, scourged, laid on the gridiron, scalded with boiling oil, and after enduring other trials, received for his victory the palm of martyrdom.

After being tortured he was dragged to Tarsus and died on the way.

His feast day is June 15.
