= Andy Macpherson =

- Born: Andy Macpherson; 6 April 1982 (age 44) Leicester, England
- Occupation: Rugby union referee

Rugby union career
Refereeing career
Years	Competition	Apps
2010	1872 Cup	

Andy Macpherson (born 6 April 1982) is a former professional rugby union referee who represented the Scottish Rugby Union. He now assesses referees internationally and is the High Performance Referee Manager for the SRU in Scotland.

== Rugby union career ==
=== Referee career ===
==== Professional career ====
Macpherson joined the West of Scotland Referees Society.

He refereed in the Celtic League.

Macpherson won SRU referee of the season in 2008–09.

He refereed his first 1872 Cup match on 27 December 2010.

He now is a Regional Referee Development Manager to bring on new referees.

==== International career ====
He now assesses referees at an international level.
