= Goth Dulla Lakhan =

Coordinates: 28°06′N 69°22′E

Goth Dulla Lakhan is a village in Sukkur District, Sindh, Pakistan, it is located at 28° 6' 0" North, 69° 22' 0" East near to the border of Punjab.
