= Dulas, Irfon =

River in Powys, Wales

Coordinates: 52.13205°N 3.52805°W

Dulas is a left-bank tributary of the Afon Irfon, itself a tributary of the River Wye. It rises on the southeastern slopes of the Elenydd and runs southeast to join the Irfon at Garth. The river is bridged by both the B4358 and the A483 roads.
