= Dullar =

- village
- Location in Punjab, India Dullar (India)
- Coordinates: 30.184618°N 76.259764°E
- Country: India
- State: Punjab
- District: Patiala

Population (2011)
  - Total: 1,254
- Time zone: UTC+5:30 (IST)
- literacy rate: 56.7
- Sex ratio: 1.06

Dullar is a village situated in the Patiala district of Punjab, India.

== Demographics ==
According to the 2011 Census of India, Dullar had a population of 1254. Males and females constituted 51.36 per cent and 48.64 per cent respectively of the population. Literacy at that time was 56.7 per cent. People classified as Scheduled Castes under India's system of positive discrimination accounted for 43.3 per cent of the population.
