= Ross Davies =

- Born: Ross Davies; 25 March 1984 (age 42) Trinant, Wales
- Height: 185 cm (6 ft 1 in)
- Weight: 120 kg (18 st 13 lb)
- School: Oakdale Comprehensive/Cwmcarn High

Rugby union career
- Position: Prop
- Current team: None
Youth career
- 2001–2003: Hafodyrynys RFC CrossKeys RFC
Amateur team(s)
Years	Team	Apps	(Points)
2003-2004	Cardiff		
2004-2005	Newbridge RFC		
2005-2007	Galwegians RFC		
2007-2008	Neath RFC		
2010-2011	Ampthill RFC		
2018-2019	Cardiff		
2018-2020	Dallas Rugby		
2019-	Pontypridd		
Senior career
Years	Team	Apps	(Points)
2008-2009	Sale Sharks		
2009	→ Worcester		
2011-2012	Rotherham		
2013-2015	Doncaster		
2019	New Orleans Gold		
Provincial / State sides
Years	Team	Apps	(Points)
2005-2007	Connacht		
2009-2010	Ospreys		
2016-2017	RGC1404		
International career
Years	Team	Apps	(Points)
2002	Wales u18		
2003	Wales u19		
2005	Wales u21		

Ross Davies is a Welsh rugby union player. Davies was born in the village of Trinant near Newbridge, Caerphilly.

A prop forward, he joined Sale Sharks from Neath RFC in 2008 having previously gained honours for the Wales U18, U19 and 2005 Grand Slam winning U21 side.

During April 2009, Davies moved to Worcester Warriors for 3 months and in May 2009 he signed for the Ospreys. He was released by the Ospreys at the end of the 2009–10 season.

In April 2011 he became only the 2nd player from Trinant to play for the Barbarians when he was invited to play for the Club in the annual Mobbs Memorial match against Bedford Blues.

Ross played with Doncaster Knights from 2013 to 2015 after previously playing for local rivals Rotherham Titans.

From 2015 onwards he has mostly played in the USA intertwined with a Welsh Cup winning season at RGC in 2017 before 2 short 3 month stints with Cardiff and Pontypridd in the winters of 2018 and 2019. Stateside he has played for Dallas Rugby and then more recently became the first Welshman to play in the professional Major League Rugby (MLR) when he turned out for New Orleans Gold in 2019. He is currently taking a COVID enforced sabbatical from playing.
