= Dulla, Bangladesh =

Coordinates: 24.75°N 90.16°E

Dulla (Bengali: দুল্লা) is a Union Parishad under Muktagachha Upazila in Mymensingh District, Bangladesh.
