= RDS Arena =

Stadium in Dublin, Ireland

- Royal Dublin Society Arena
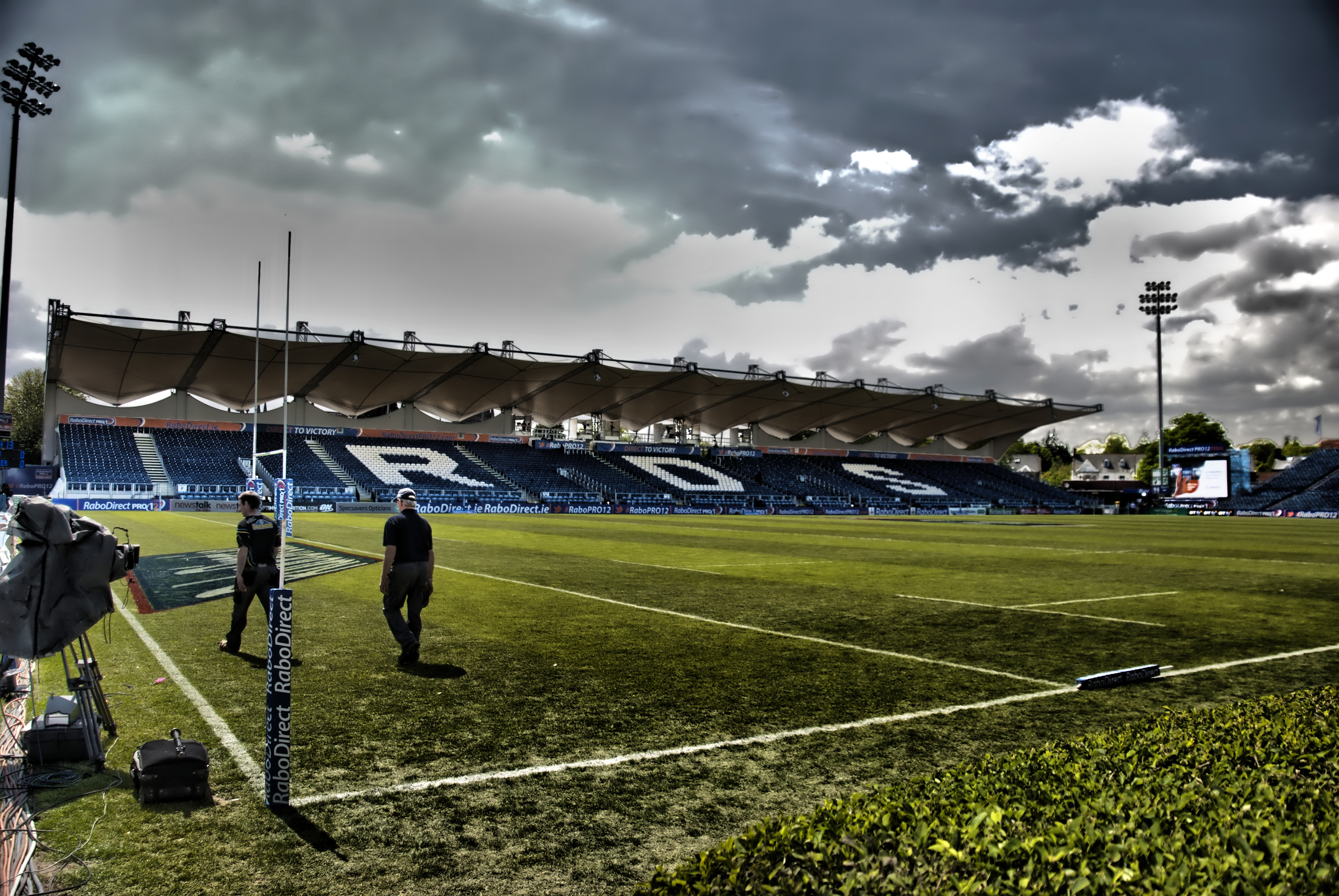
- Royal Dublin Society Arena: the 2013 Pro12 Grand Final

- Location within Dublin
- Location: Ballsbridge, Dublin, Ireland
- Coordinates: 53°19′32″N 6°13′46″W
- Owner: Royal Dublin Society
- Capacity: 20,600 (rugby union); 38,000 (concerts) Former capacity: List: rugby union, football: 13,500 (pre–2007); rugby union, football: 18,500 (2007–2024); Concerts: 40,000 (2007–2024)
- Surface: Grass
- Public transit: DART: Sandymount Station; Dublin Bus Routes: 4, 7, 7a, 7n, 18, 27x Aircoach Route: 702 (Dublin Airport to Greystones/Bray); Luas: Beechwood (Green Line; 2.3 km walk)

Construction
- Opened: 1868
- Renovated: 2007–2009; 2024–2026
- Expanded: 2007; 2026

Tenants
- Shamrock Rovers F.C. (1990–1996); Leinster Rugby (2005–present)

RDS Arena also known for sponsorship reasons as the Laya Arena is a multi-purpose sports stadium, owned by the Royal Dublin Society (RDS) and located in the Dublin suburb of Ballsbridge, Ireland.

The arena was developed to host equestrian events, primarily the annual Dublin Horse Show, which was first held there in 1881. The site had been acquired in 1879 by the RDS. The primary tenants of the RDS Arena are Leinster Rugby who compete in the United Rugby Championship and Champions Cup. The arena has also hosted soccer and wrestling events and concerts. The capacity of the venue is 20,600 for football and rugby matches, but it can accommodate over 40,000 for concerts.

The demountable north and south stands are removed for equestrian events, with only the Grandstand and Anglesea Stand permanent. The Anglesea Stand was completed in 1927.

== History ==
The grandstand was rebuilt in 2006 for the 2006–07 rugby season, to replace the old wooden stand when Leinster first became permanent tenants. Prior to this the RDS could accommodate 13,500 fans for Leinster Heineken cup fixtures. A roof was added during 2008–09. Starting in 2011 there were plans to redevelop the arena, replacing the Anglesea Stand with another new permanent stand, which would incorporate the only terraced area of the stadium.

In July 2014, it was announced by the RDS and Leinster Rugby that a design competition was being held to develop the arena into a 25,000 capacity world class stadium, with work expected to commence on the redevelopment in April 2016. The selling of naming rights to the arena was thought to be a key component in funding the project, with a budget of at least €20,000,000 being proposed. A consortium of architect firms, Dublin-based Newenham Mulligan Architects and London-based Grimshaw Architects, won the international design competition for the multimillion-euro redevelopment of the RDS Arena. However, the original planning permission granted in 2018, lapsed and a new application filed.

In September 2024 the RDS began the regeneration of its main arena. The project included a new 6,775 capacity Anglesea Stand. The 20,600-seat arena was completed in August 2026. In October 2026 Leinster played their first match at the revamped stadium, beating Cardiff 29–5 in front 20,600 fans.

== Sporting events ==
=== Association football ===
The RDS stadium first hosted a football match on 30 September 1990 when Shamrock Rovers used it as a home ground. For the next six seasons until April 1996, Rovers played their home games there. The stadium held its first international match on 19 February 1992 when it played host to a home game between Ireland and Wales national football team. The stadium hosted some games of the 1994 UEFA European Under-16 Football Championships including the third-place playoff and the final. The final of the FAI Cup was held at the RDS in 2007 and 2008 during the construction of the Aviva Stadium. The 2009 final, however, was moved to Tallaght Stadium. The RDS hosted a game between St Patrick's Athletic and Hertha Berlin in the 2008–09 UEFA Cup first round. St Patrick's Athletic also played Steaua București in the Arena on 27 August 2009 in the Europa League. The RDS Arena hosted the Ireland team when they played Paraguay and Algeria in May 2010.

Ireland International Football Matches
Date	Home	Score	Opponent	Competition	Attendance
19 February 1992	Republic of Ireland	0–1	Wales	Friendly	15,100
25 May 2010	Republic of Ireland	2–1	Paraguay	Friendly	16,722
28 May 2010	Republic of Ireland	3–0	Algeria	Friendly	16,800

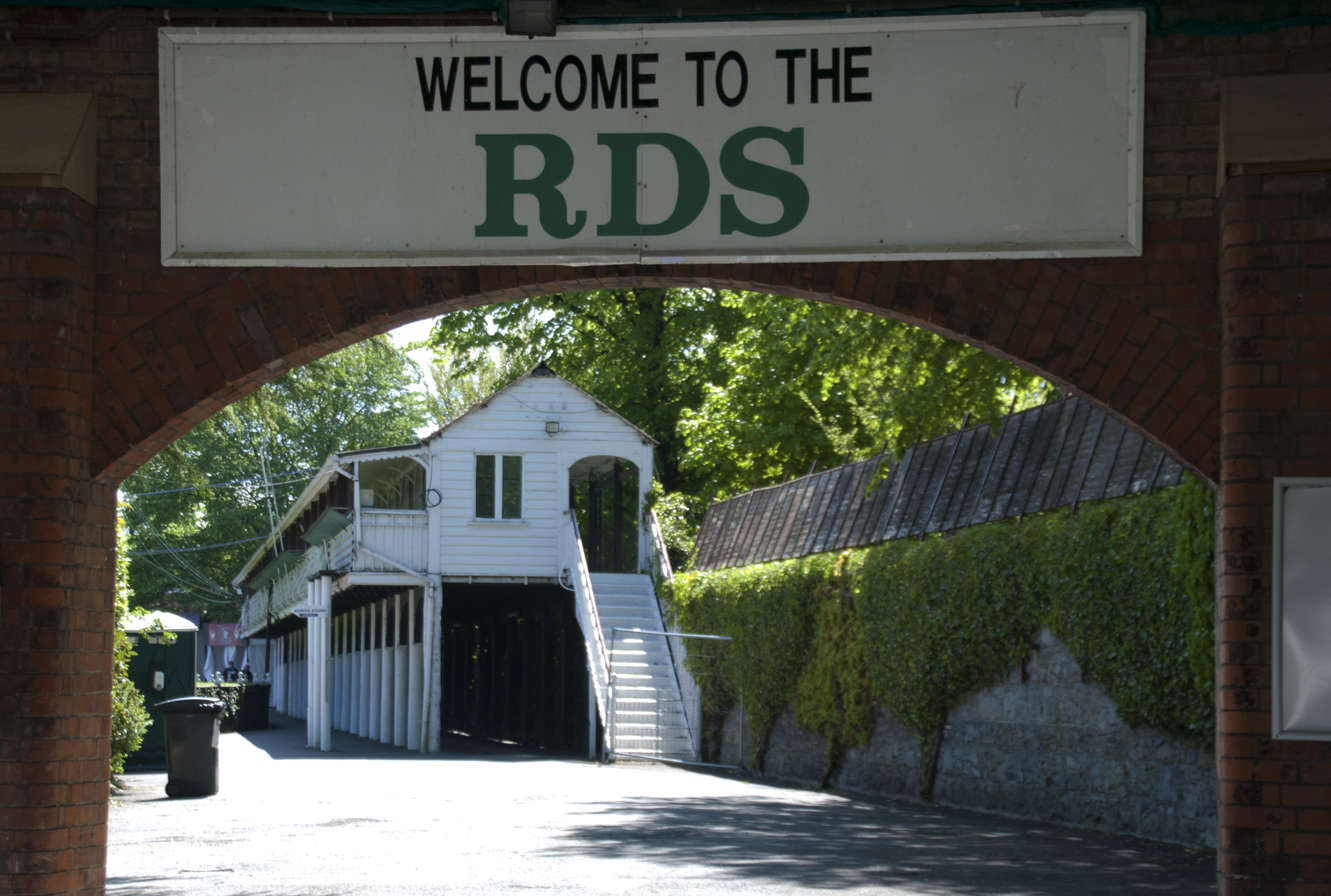
RDS arena entrance

=== Show jumping ===
The RDS Arena was originally constructed to host show-jumping events, the Dublin Horse Show having been held by the RDS annually since 1864. In 1881 the Show moved to 'Ball's Bridge', a greenfield site. The first continuous 'leaping' course was introduced at the Show. In the same year the first viewing stand was erected on the site of the present grandstand. It held 800 people.

In 1925, Colonel Zeigler of the Swiss Army first suggested holding an international jumping event. The Aga Khan of the time heard of this proposal and offered a challenge trophy to the winner of the competition. In 1926, international competitions were introduced to the show and was the first time the Nations' Cup for the Aga Khan Challenge trophy was held. Up until 1949, the Nations' Cup teams had to consist of military officers. Six countries competed in the first international teams competition for the Aga Khan Challenge trophy – Great Britain, the Netherlands, Belgium, France, Switzerland and Ireland. The Swiss team won the title on Irish bred horses.

In 1976, after 50 years of international competition, the two grass banks in the arena were removed so the arena could be used for other events. The continental bank at the western end of the main arena was added later.

The RDS also hosted the Show Jumping World Championships in 1982.

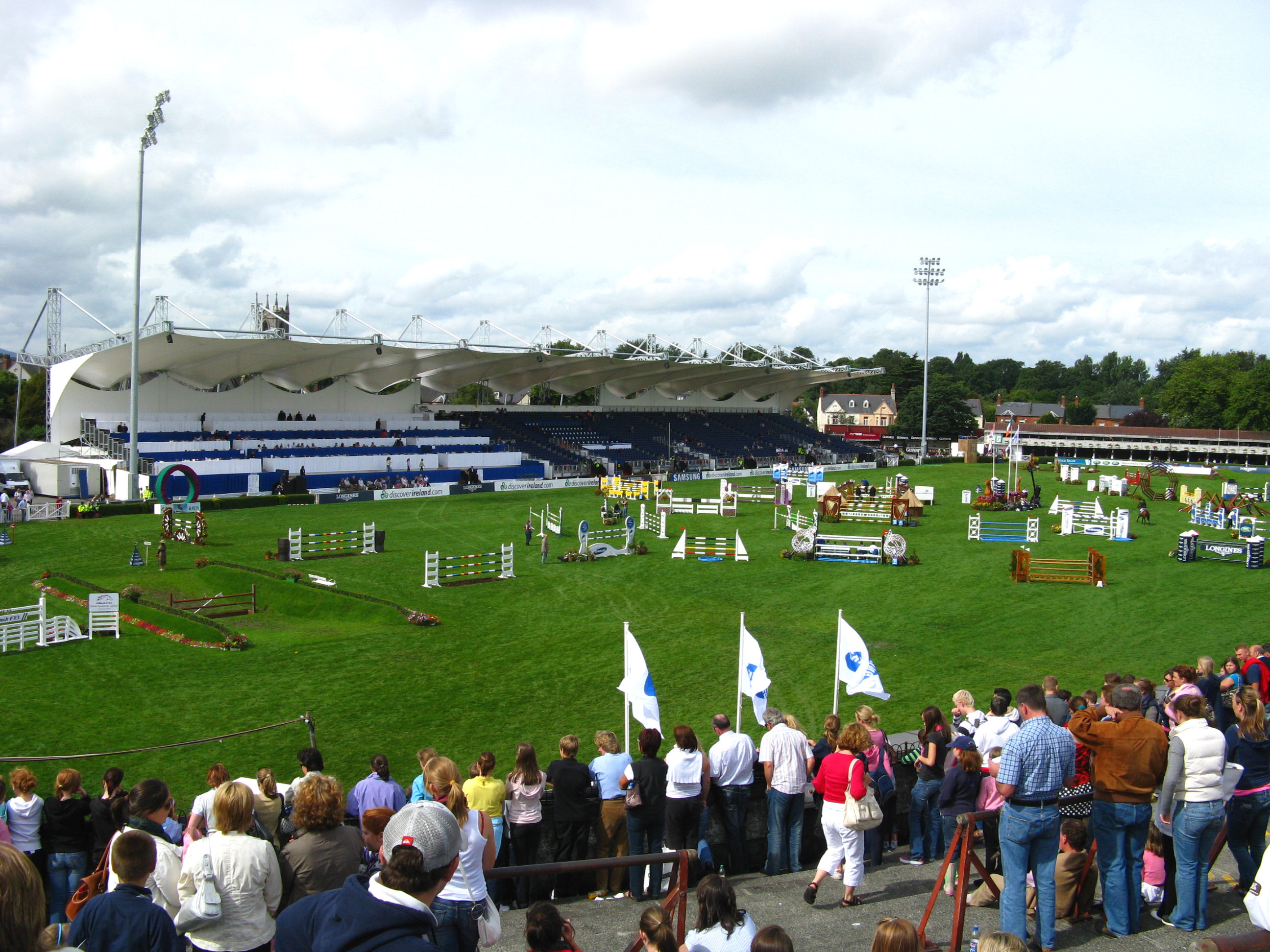
Dublin Horse Show 2008 – main arena

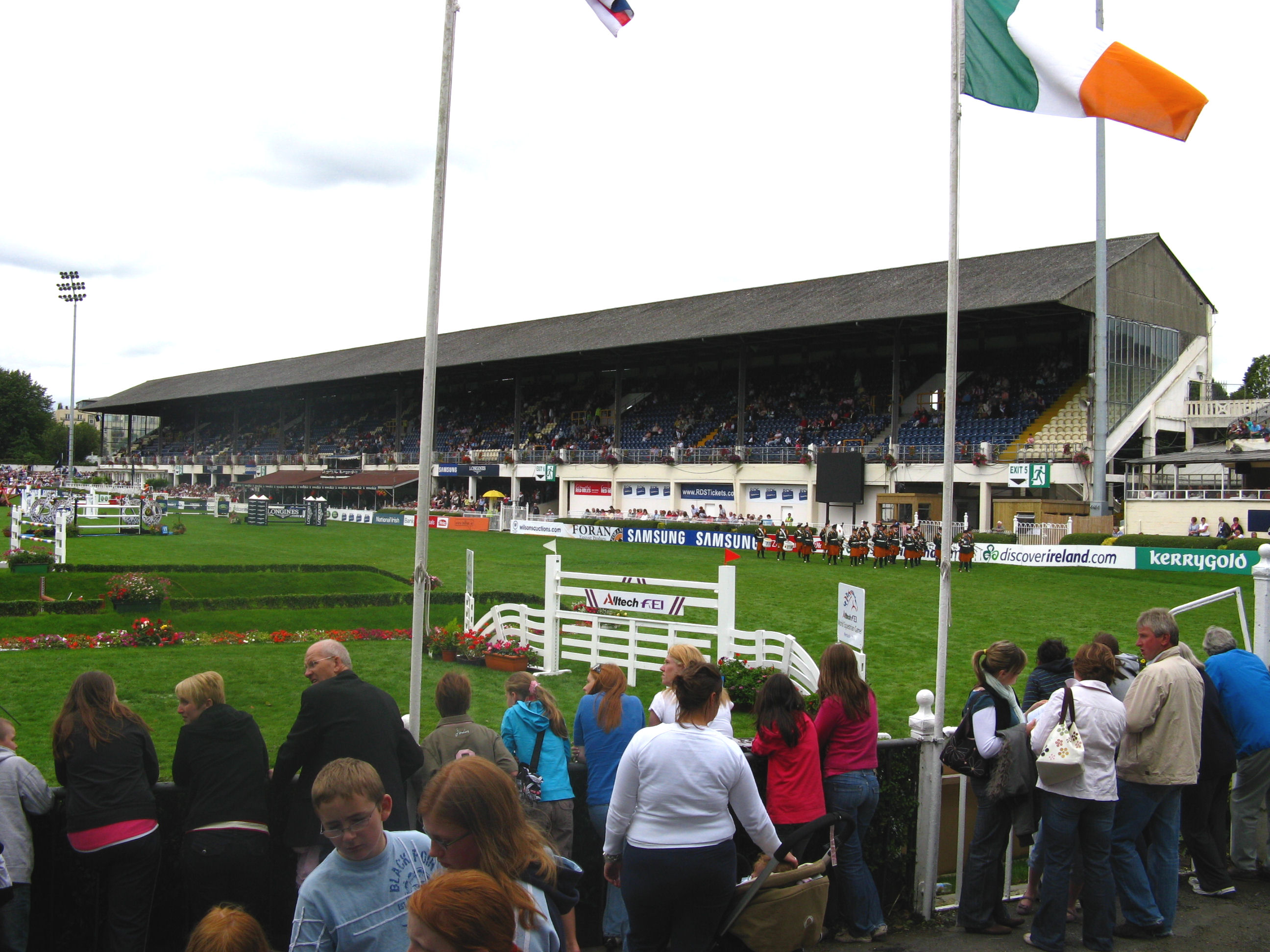
2008 Dublin Horse Show

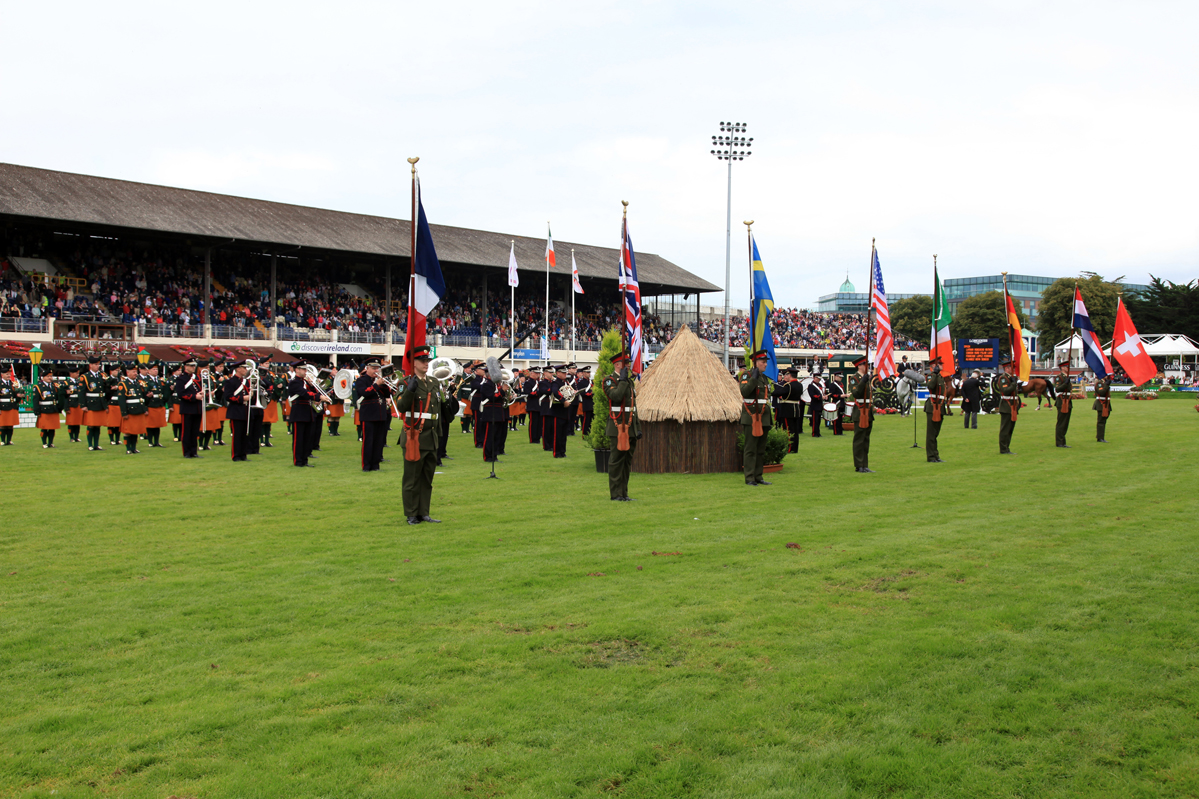
Bands and Military Police in the RDS Arena prior to the 2010 Dublin Horse Show

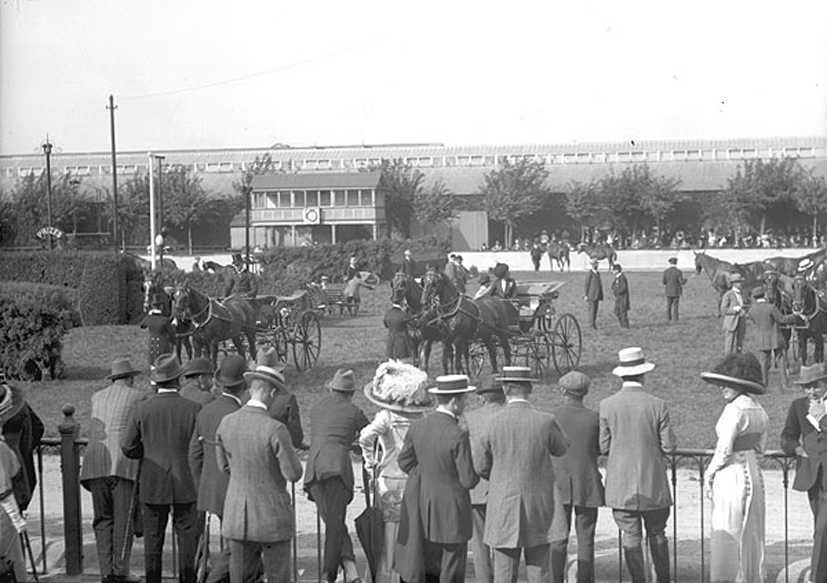
The Dublin Horse Show circa 1920

=== Rugby union ===
The stadium first opened its doors to rugby union on Saturday 15 October 2005, hosting a game between Leinster Rugby and the Cardiff Blues, which Leinster won 34–15, the arena hosted four further games that season. The following season, the RDS was not used by Leinster due to redevelopment.

The 2007–08 season saw the RDS become the official home of Leinster when the branch signed a 20-year lease on the ground, with all of the home games for the season to be hosted there. This change came about after it became apparent that the team's former home of Donnybrook Stadium no longer had a sufficient capacity. After renovation and expansion, the Grandstand and North and South Stands were expanded, boosting the capacity to 18,500 along with floodlights being installed and a new playing surface being laid, to withstand the demands of a full rugby season and show jumping events.

The RDS had proven to be a successful hunting ground for Leinster, as they won 11 of their 12 home games that season, culminating on Saturday 3 May 2008 in a 41–8 victory over Newport Gwent Dragons and lifting the Celtic League trophy that day. In all, Leinster had played 18 games in the RDS, losing only twice, to Bath and Scarlets. Between March 2008 and 2010, the final of the Leinster Schools Senior Cup was played in the RDS due to the redevelopment of Lansdowne Road, its traditional venue.

The RDS hosted the autumn rugby international between Ireland and Fiji on 21 November 2009, with Ireland running out convincing winners 41–6. The stadium also hosted the 2010, 2012, 2013, 2014, and 2021 Pro12 and Pro14 Grand Finals and the 2013 Challenge Cup Final between Leinster and Stade Français, which saw a sell-out crowd of 20,396 people. On 26 March 2022, the RDS hosted 6,113 fans for the opening round of the 2022 Women's Six Nations Championship, a record attendance for an Irish women's international test match.

Ireland International Rugby Union Matches
Date	Home	Score	Opponent	Competition	Attendance
13 February 2009	Ireland A	35–10	Scotland A	—N/a	
21 November 2009	Ireland	41–6	Fiji	2009 end-of-year rugby union internationals	16,500
4 November 2022	Ireland A	19–47	All Blacks XV	2022 end-of-year rugby union internationals	

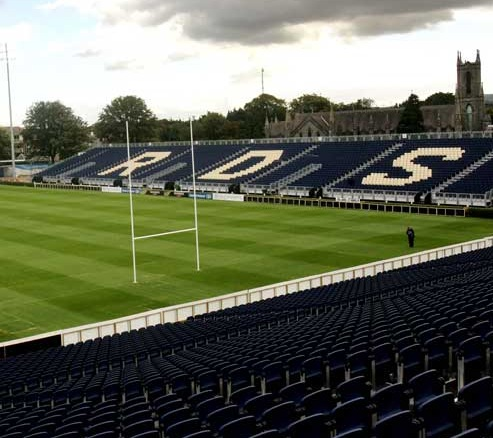
Grandstand prior to roof construction

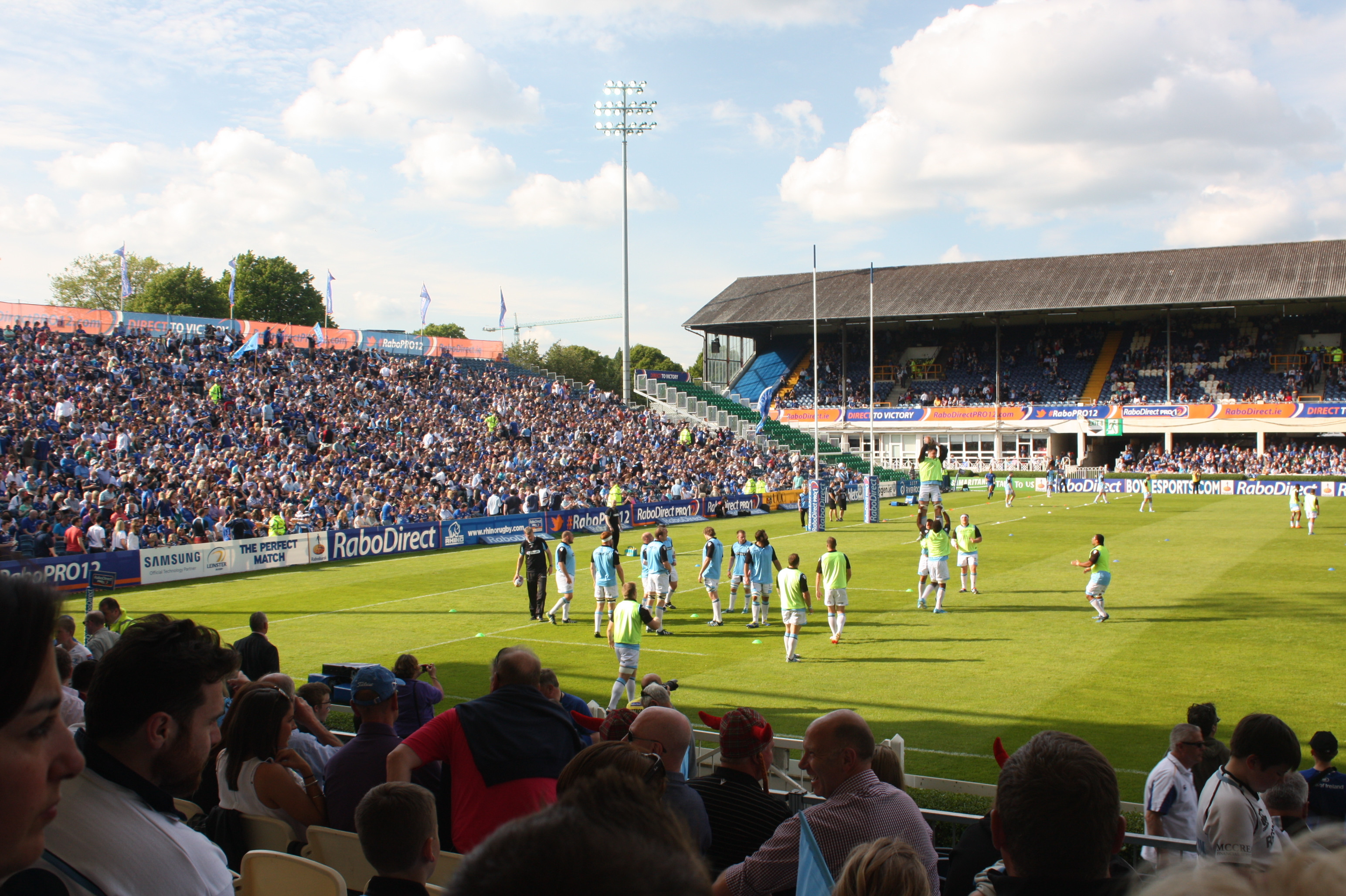
2014 Pro12 final

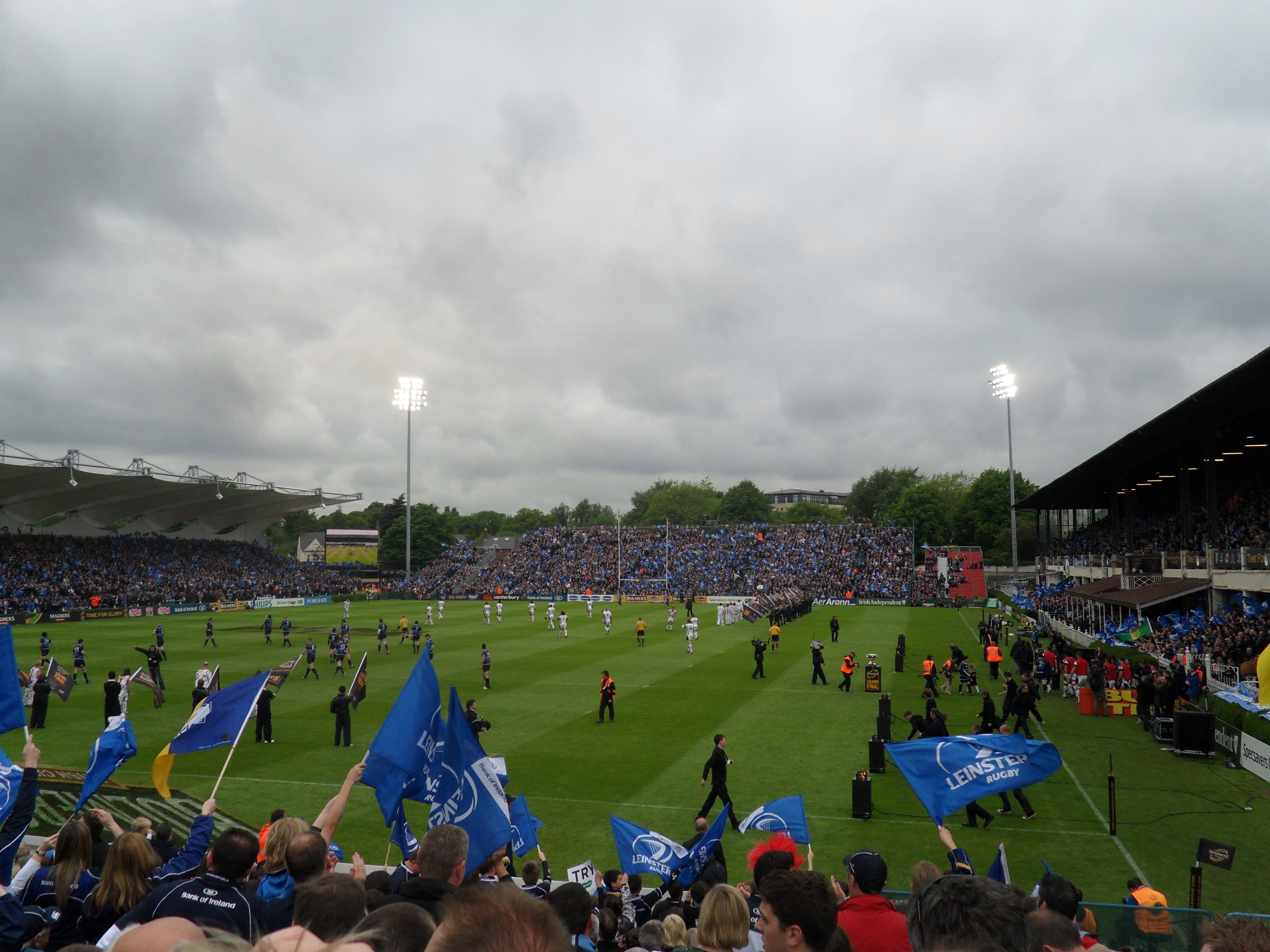
2010 Magners League Final

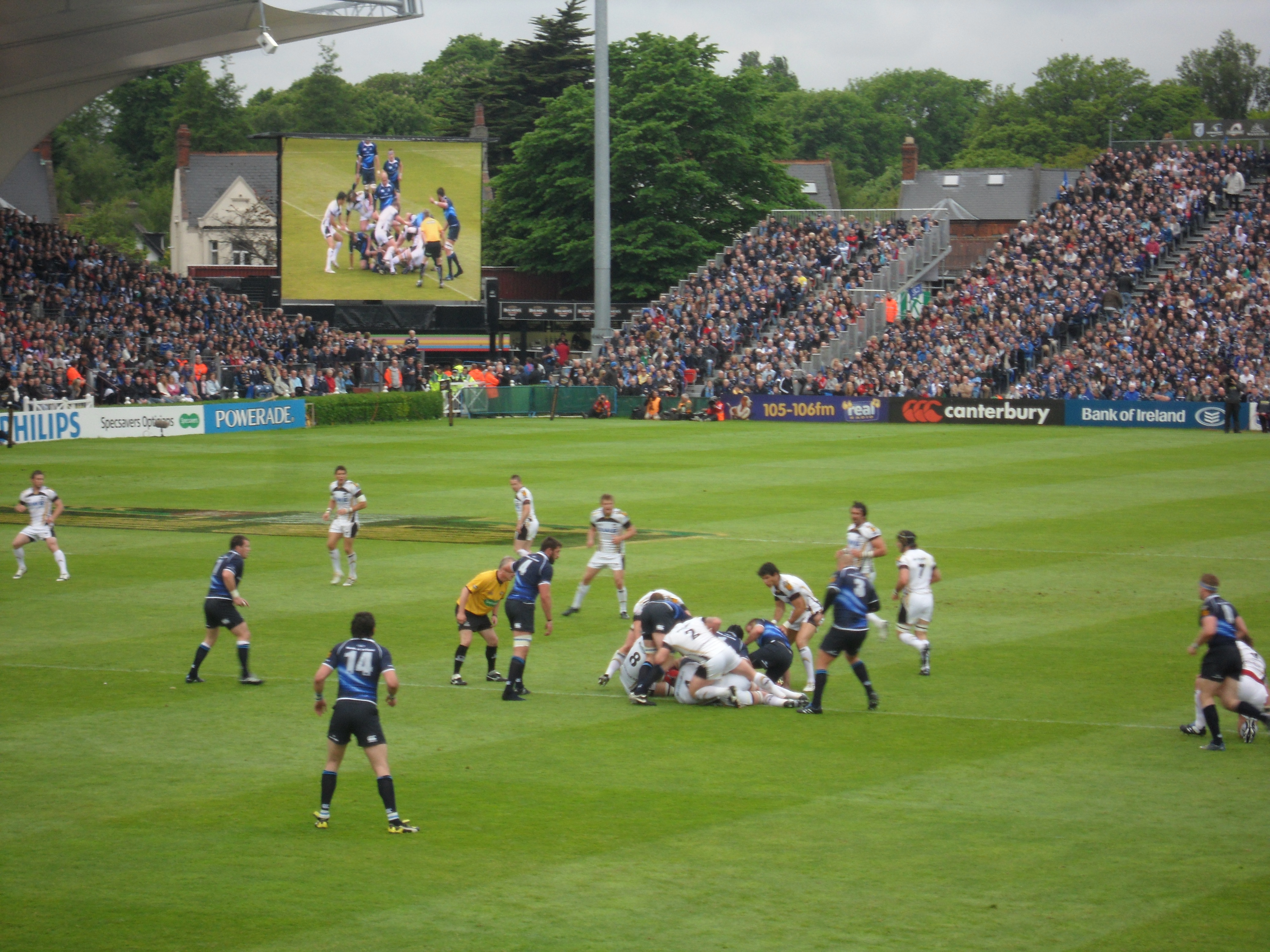
2010 Magners Cup Final

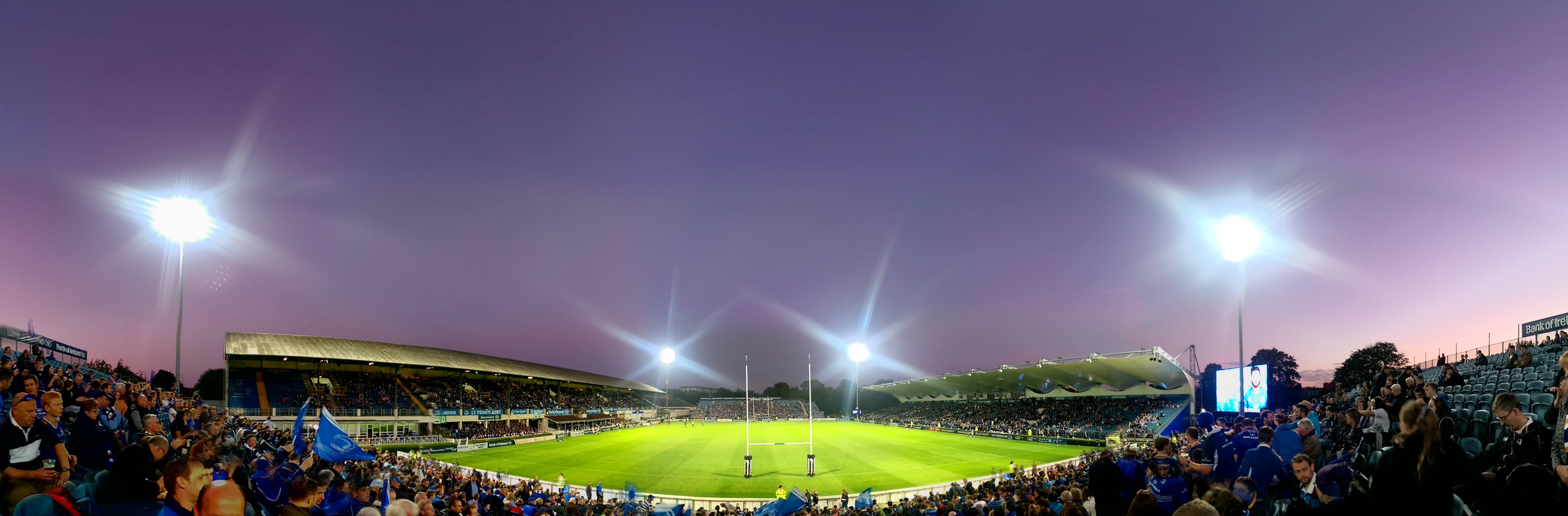
Inside the RDS Arena prior to a Leinster Game

=== Rugby league ===
In August 1995, Ireland won their first ever home rugby league match against Scotland at the RDS Arena, as a curtain raiser to the Charity Shield match between Leeds Rhinos and Wigan Warriors. The matches were played before an attendance of 5,716, a record for an international rugby league match on Irish soil. In August 2026, Warrington Wolves announced they would stage their 2027 Super League match against Wigan Warriors at the stadium. The following day St Helens announced they would play Hull F.C. at the venue the following day.

Rugby League Matches
Date	Home	Score	Opponent	Competition	Attendance
13 August 1995	Ireland	26–22	Scotland	Test Match	5,716
13 August 1995	Wigan Warriors	45–20	Leeds Rhinos	1995 Charity Shield	5,716

=== Wrestling ===
The Arena hosted a WWE event on 18 June 2005, part of the WWE Summerbash Tour, which featured Kurt Angle, Eddie Guerrero, Rey Mysterio, John Cena and Stone Cold Steve Austin.

== Concerts ==
=== Bruce Springsteen ===
Bruce Springsteen has played 11 times at the arena. His first show was during the Tunnel of Love Express Tour in 1988 in front of 42,000 fans, the second in 1993 during the Bruce Springsteen 1992–1993 World Tour in front of 40,000 people, the third during the Reunion Tour in front of 40,000 people followed by The Rising Tour in 1999 and 2003 in front of 40,000 people each time. He played three sold-out shows during the Magic Tour in 2008 in front of more than 115,000 people, and then in 2009 during the Working on a Dream Tour his two concerts at the arena sold more than 80,000 tickets. He played again in 2012 during his Wrecking Ball World Tour for 76,000 people. Bruce Springsteen And The E Street Band returned to the Arena on the 5 and 7 May 2023 as part of their 2023 International Tour, with a third, additional show on 9 May 2023.

=== 1970s ===
Boney M. performed at the RDS on 27 November 1978. This concert was recorded by RTÉ Television and broadcast on Christmas Day 1978 as part of the 'Event on Two' series. In 2015, the concert was released on DVD, called Diamonds.

=== 1980s ===
Thin Lizzy played RDS Area on April 9 and 10th 1983 on their Thunder and Lighting Tour. Tina Turner performed twice at the stadium: first for her Break Every Rule World Tour on 30 May 1987 and then during her Twenty Four Seven Tour, on 11 July 2000; the latter attracted 40,000 fans. Simple Minds played the RDS on their Street Fighting Years tour, 19 August 1989.

=== 1990s ===
Prince played the venue on 13 June 1992 as part of his Diamonds and Pearls Tour.

U2 played the arena on 27 and 28 August 1993 as a conclusion to the Zooropa tour, the European stadium leg of the ZooTV tour, which supported the album Achtung Baby. The second show was broadcast internationally on the radio, being 15–20 minutes delayed, reportedly due to the band's generosity to the playing time of their opening bands (Scary Eire and Stereo MC's). During the opening number Zoo Station on this night, Bono altered a lyric to say "Hey child, it's alright, sleeping in my own bed tonight."

The Eagles played their Hell Freezes Over tour on 6 July 1996. Radiohead played to 38,000 people, on 20 June 1997, which was their highest attended performance at the time. Michael Jackson played his HIStory World Tour concert on 19 July 1997 here in front of more than 43,000 people. Shania Twain performed there on 10 July 1999 as part of her Come On Over Tour. Boyzone, an Irish boyband, played at the arena in 1999, and once again, during their reunion, in 2008.

=== 2000s ===
Britney Spears performed at RDS on 6 June 2004 as part of The Onyx Hotel Tour. Iron Maiden performed at the RDS during their Early Days tour in 2005 to a crowd of over 35 thousand, supported by Turbonegro and Marilyn Manson, the first time the latter had been allowed to play in Ireland. Guns N' Roses played at the venue on 9 June 2006, as part of their Chinese Democracy Tour. Metallica, Alice In Chains and Avenged Sevenfold played at the venue on 11 June 2006.

=== 2010s ===
Paul McCartney played RDS on his Up and Coming Tour on 12 June 2010 and was thankful to the venue, due to a fireworks display that couldn't be done in an indoor arena (such as the O2 Arena, which hosted his Good Evening Europe Tour, 2009). P!nk performed at the venue on 19 June 2010 during The Funhouse Summer Carnival, and again on 18 June 2019 as part of her Beautiful Trauma World Tour. Bon Jovi have played the venue many times most recently in June 2019 playing two nights. They played over two nights in June 2011 to over 80,000 people. Justin Bieber played here as part of his Purpose World Tour on 21 June 2017. Fleetwood Mac played at the RDS as part of their An Evening with Fleetwood Mac tour on 13 June 2019. Foo Fighters performed here on 21 August 2019 as part of their Summer European Tour. Post Malone played at the RDS as part of his Beerbongs & Bentleys Tour on 22 August 2019.

=== 2020s ===
Rammstein performed here as part of their Stadium Tour on 23 June 2024.

== Religious gatherings ==
The RDS Arena was the principal venue for the 50th International Catholic Eucharistic Congress held 10–17 June 2012. Eucharistic Congresses are held generally every four years in different places around the world to promote an awareness of the central place of the eucharist in the mission of the Catholic Church. Expected attendance was 10,000-20,000 persons each day, with up to 80,000 at the closing Mass in Croke Park on 17 June.

== See also ==
- Aviva Stadium
- Donnybrook Stadium
