= Dan Biggar =

Welsh rugby union player (born 1989)

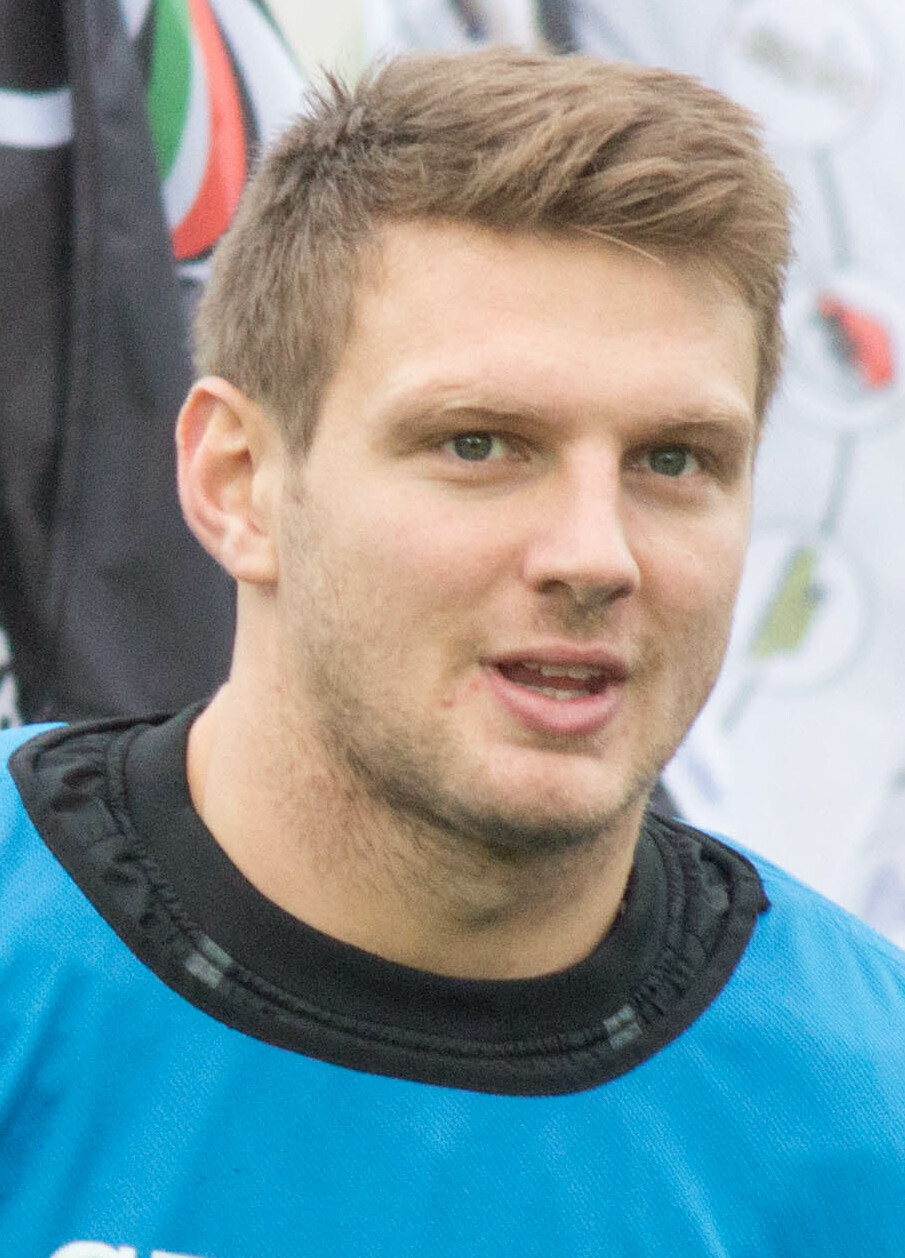
- Biggar in 2015
- Born: Daniel Rhys Biggar; 16 October 1989 (age 37) Morriston, Swansea, Wales
- Height: 1.88 m (6 ft 2 in)
- Weight: 90 kg (200 lb; 14 st 2 lb)
- School: Gowerton Comprehensive School

Rugby union career
- Position: Fly-half
Youth career
- Gorseinon
Amateur team(s)
| Years | Team | Apps | (Points) |
| 2007–2008 | Swansea | 13 | ((129)) |
Senior career
| Years | Team | Apps | (Points) |
| 2007–2018 | Ospreys | 221 | (2,203) |
| 2018–2022 | Northampton Saints | 69 | (614) |
| 2022–2025 | Toulon | 41 | (147) |
- Correct as of 8 August 2025
International career
| Years | Team | Apps | (Points) |
| 2008 | Wales U20 | 9 | (45) |
| 2008–2023 | Wales | 112 | (633) |
| 2017, 2021 | British & Irish Lions | 3 | (27) |
- Correct as of 19:44, 25 March 2024 (UTC)

Daniel Biggar (born 16 October 1989) is a Welsh former professional rugby union player. A Wales international, Biggar played fly half and was twice selected to tour with the British and Irish Lions.

== Early life and club rugby ==
Born in Morriston, Swansea, Biggar came through the Ospreys development pathway, having attended Gowerton Comprehensive School in Swansea. He played his club rugby at Gorseinon RFC. He featured in the Premiership in the white of Swansea RFC. He made his Ospreys debut as an 18-year old at the Millennium Stadium, coming off the bench late on in an EDF Energy Cup semi-final win over Saracens. On 12 September 2008, Biggar made his first Ospreys start in a Magners League game against Glasgow Warriors. Biggar kicked 9 points including a long range drop-goal as the Ospreys ran out 18–21 winners at Firhill.

Biggar finished the 2010–11 Celtic League as top points scorer, ending the season with 248 points. He would follow this up the following season, again finishing top scorer on 257 points as Ospreys ran out PRO12 Champions. This season concluded with Biggar sinking the title-winning touchline conversion in the Grand Final win over Leinster.

In September 2017 it was announced Biggar would join English Premiership side Northampton ahead of the 2018/19 season. Following his exit from the Ospreys, Biggar held multiple records at the region. In 2012 he became the youngest player to reach 100 Ospreys appearances at just 22 and became the youngest to make 200 aged just 27 in 2017. He also became Ospreys and the Pro 14's record points scorer with 2203 points to his name.

Biggar made his Northampton debut against the Ospreys in a pre-season friendly ahead of the 2018/2019 season. That season saw Saints lift the Premiership Rugby Cup and reach the knock-out stages of the Premiership for the first time in four years.

On 27 October 2022, he left Northampton to join top French side Toulon in the Top 14 competition with immediate effect. In April 2025 Biggar announced that he would be retiring at the end of the 2024-2025 season.

== International career ==
=== Wales ===
A Wales age grades international, Biggar was selected for the Wales national rugby union team for the 2008 Autumn Internationals series, making his debut at the age of 19 against Canada on 18 November.

On 18 January 2010, Biggar was named in the 35-man Wales national squad for the 2010 Six Nations tournament.

After 18 months in the wilderness, including missing the 2011 Rugby World Cup, Biggar was recalled for the 2012 Welsh squad after a run of good form with the Ospreys. This form was topped off by the match-winning conversion from the touchline in the 2012 Pro12 Grand Final, as well as a number of man-of-the-match performances in the run-in at the end of the season. Biggar finally got his chance in the Welsh number 10 shirt in the victorious 2013 Six Nations Championship campaign, starting all five games at fly half, thanks to a Rhys Priestland injury. Biggar capped off the tournament with a drop goal, conversion and penalty in the Championship decider against England.

Biggar continued his good run of form into the 2013–14 season, his performances for the Ospreys earning him a call-up for the 2013 Autumn Internationals, in which he started against Australia and Argentina, scoring a try against the former. He played three games during the 2014 Six Nations, coming on as a substitute for Rhys Priestland against France and England and starting against Scotland. In June 2014 Biggar started two tests against South Africa, including in the narrow 31–30 second test defeat, despite being yellow-carded. Biggar cemented his place as the Wales starting fly-half during the 2014 Autumn Internationals, starting three out of the four tests. He received many plaudits for his world-class performances, as well as receiving the man-of-the-match award against South Africa in a 12–6 victory.

Biggar starred in all of Wales' 2015 Six Nations Championship matches, and scored his first Welsh try vs France.

In the 2015 Rugby World Cup, Biggar took over the kicking duties after Halfpenny was ruled out of the whole tournament. Biggar kicked 56 points during the tournament including 23 points in Wales' 28–25 win over England, and claimed the Man of the Match accolade. In the quarter-final, he converted Gareth Davies' try against South Africa. Despite this, Wales would go on to lose 23–19.

On 12 November 2016, Biggar won his 50th Wales cap in an Autumn International against Argentina as Wales ran out 24–20 winners.

Biggar was selected as part of the Wales squad for 2019 Rugby World Cup. Biggar entered the tournament as first choice fly-half and played a pivotal role as Wales reached the semi-finals. In the second pool game against Australia, Biggar kicked the fastest drop-goal in Rugby World Cup history with the referee signalling the score after 36 seconds. Biggar missed the final Pool game against Uruguay due to a second head injury of the tournament but returned for the quarter-final against France. In this game, Biggar kicked a 75th minute conversion and the final score of the game to help Wales progress with a tight 20–19 win. Biggar would play the final two games of the tournament; the semi-final defeat to South Africa and Bronze Final defeat against New Zealand.

With Alun Wyn Jones out injured, Biggar was the captain for the 2022 Six Nations campaign. On 12 February 2022, in the match against Scotland, he earned his 100th international cap.

Biggar has his own routine before kicking goals, which fans now call "The Biggarena" after Los Del Rio's 1995 hit, Macarena.

=== British & Irish Lions ===
In April 2017, Biggar was selected for the 2017 British & Irish Lions tour to New Zealand as one of three Fly-half options. Biggar made his first start of the tour in the provincial game against the Blues on 7 June 2017, but was withdrawn after a 35 minutes and failed to reappear following a HIA. Biggar would next appear in the fourth tour game against the Highlanders, assisting the opening try for Jonathan Joseph and kicking his first points as the Lions narrowly lost 33–32, despite being up when Biggar left the field. Biggar's stand out performance came against the Chiefs, kicking 100% in a comfortable win. Despite his impressive form in the provincial games, Biggar would not make a test appearance against the All Blacks. Biggar ended the tour with 35 points from 5 appearances.

Biggar was selected for his second British and Irish Lions tour in May 2021 against reigning World Champions South Africa. Biggar started in the pre-tour match against Japan at Murrayfield. Biggar kicked 4 conversions and assisted Tadhg Beirne's try, being named Player of the Match. Biggar's first appearance in South Africa was against the Sharks on 10 July 2021, kicking 16 points in a 71–31 win. Biggar was selected to start the first test 24 July 2021, making his test debut, as the Lions took a 1–0 series lead. Biggar kicked 5/6 for a total of 14 points before leaving the field with a head injury. The Lions lost the second test 27–9, and in his 57 minutes on the pitch, Biggar passed the ball three times. Biggar suffered a shin injury after 10 minutes of the third test which led to his early withdrawal from the game. Biggar's tour ended with 47 points from 5 appearances.

=== International tries ===
| Try | Opponent | Location | Venue | Competition | Date | Result |
|---|---|---|---|---|---|---|
| 1 | France | Paris, France | Stade de France | 2015 Six Nations | 28 February 2015 | Win |
| 2 | England | London, England | Twickenham | 2016 Six Nations | 12 March 2016 | Loss |
| 3 | Italy | Cardiff, Wales | Millennium Stadium | 2016 Six Nations | 19 March 2016 | Win |
| 4 | Tonga | Cardiff, Wales | Millennium Stadium | 2018 Autumn Internationals | 17 November 2018 | Win |
| 5 | France | Cardiff, Wales | Millennium Stadium | 2020 Six Nations | 22 February 2020 | Loss |
| 6 | England | London, England | Twickenham Stadium | 2020 Six Nations | 7 March 2020 | Loss |
| 7 | France | Paris, France | Stade de France | 2021 Six Nations | 20 March 2021 | Loss |
| 8 | Argentina | Marseille, France | Stade Vélodrome | 2023 World Cup | 14 October 2023 | Loss |

== Personal life ==
On 7 December 2015, Biggar won the BBC Cymru Wales Sports Personality of the Year.
