= Yohann Vivalda =

- Born: 8 December 1988 (age 37) Agen, France
- Height: 2.00 m (6 ft 6 1/2 in)
- Weight: 107 kg (16 st 12 lb)

Rugby union career
- Position: Flanker
Senior career
Years	Team	Apps	(Points)
2007–	USA Perpignan	34	(15)
2013	COLOMIER	43	(5)
- Correct as of 4 December 2012

Yohann Vivalda (born 8 December 1988) is a French rugby union player. His position is Flanker and he currently plays for USA Perpignan in the Top 14.
