= Vivalda Dula =

Angolan singer-songwriter and percussionist

Vivalda Ndula
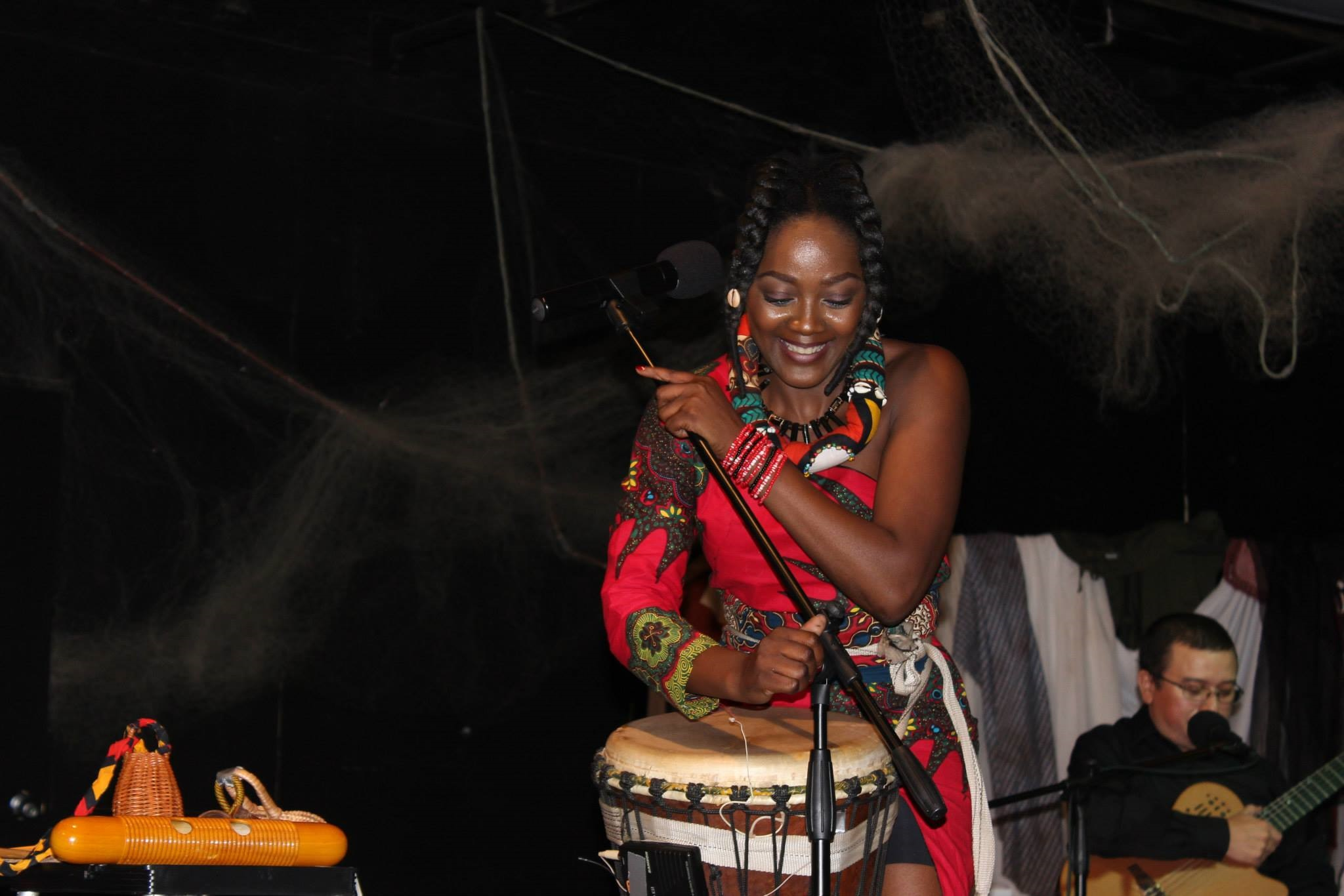
- Vivalda Ndula performing live at Elinga Teatro in Luanda

Background information
- Born: Vivalda Patrícia António Branco; Luanda, Angola
- Genres: World, Afro-pop, semba, jazz, afrobeat
- Occupations: Singer-songwriter, producer
- Instruments: Vocals, djembe, multi-percussion, guitar, banji
- Years active: 2009–present
- Labels: DBACS Music Division
- Website: http://www.vivaldadula.com

Vivalda Ndula (born Vivalda Patrícia António Branco) is an Angolan singer-songwriter, dancer and percussionist.

== Life and career ==
=== Early life and education ===
Vivalda Ndula was born in Luanda, Angola. She is the sixth of ten siblings. Her father was a former FAPLA soldier during the Angolan Civil War period. When he returned unstable from the war, Ndula's mother worried about the children's safety ran away from him taking the children including Vivalda Ndula. Two years later Ndula's father died when she was only 9 years old. In her late teens, she was a football player and enter to a second-division team called Footscola in Terra Nova. She earned a scholarship from Footscola that allowed her to conclude her pre-university studies in Social Science at private school named "Cruz Linda" in Luanda.

Vivalda Ndula started her artistic career as Dancer signed by MINESSA Afro-contemporary Dance Company and last until 2004. Later on, she moved to MANESSÉMA Afro-contemporary Dance Company with whom she toured in Spain for the 7th International Festival of Traditional Music and Dance in Valencia. Also, she co-hosted the Angolan Public Television show "Estrelas ao Palco" in 2004.

While studying for a Bachelor's degree in International Affairs at UPRA University in Luanda, Ndula worked a day job as Assistant of former Japan Ambassador in Angola, Mr. Kazuhiko Koshikawa helping to pay for tuition fees of her 3 youngest brothers and sisters and also to help her widowed mother in her country – Angola, where socio-economic and politic life was very unstable. Later, Ndula relocated to the US, where she completed an Associated Degree at Houston Community College.

In 2017, Dula earned a Master's degree in Administration and Management of Cultural Industries at the Miguel de Cervantes European University in Spain.

=== Musical career ===
In 2009 Ndula created the Afro-contemporary Dance and Percussion company Karapinha Dura and began experimenting with the fusion of Angolan traditional sound and classical music.

Her first musical show was the Afro-contemporary "MUJÍTU" or "The Guest", created in 2010. The show written, produced, and directed by herself premiered in 2011 in Luanda and in Houston in 2013 during the 6th Akwaaba Dance and Drum Festival.

In 2013 Vivalda released her first solo work an EP "Insanidade Mental" (Mental Insanity). She toured the United States with "Vivalda Ndula USA Tour 2014 – Henda Mua Ngola" to promote the album, performing in Washington, D.C., Chicago, New York City, Austin and Houston.

Throughout her career, Vivalda Ndula performed for different venues such as Angola Embassy in Washington D.C, Angola Consulate in Houston, Montreal Jazz Festival, WOBEON-world music and peace festival (Austin), Globalquerque Festival, Fethiye World Music Festival in Turkey. In 2010, Vivalda Dula and her band sung in the opening of the "Beat and Wind from Japanasia" taiko show in Luanda.

Vivalda cited as her inspiration during younger years Angolan and world influential musicians and bands as Mito Gaspar, Bonga (musician), Waldemar Bastos, Ngola Ritmos, Miriam Makeba, Angelique Kidjo, Tina Turner and Ella Fitzgerald. Mostly she sings in Portuguese and Kimbundu (Angola native language). Her musical style blends together Angolan traditional roots, jazz, rock and soul.

== Discography ==
– DULA, 2018 (Album) AFRICA, 2015 (Album) INSANIDADE MENTAL, 2013 (EP)

COLLABORATIONS:

| 2014, single "Mázui" feat Kris Becker and Shiwei Wei and released during her concert in Houston.

| 2016, single "Je t´aime" feat Cheick Hamala Diabaté, nominated for Grammy Award.

Insanidade Mental

=== Track list ===
| No. | Title | Length |
|---|---|---|
| 1. | "Henda Mua Ngola" | 3:37 |
| 2. | "Sonho" | 3:41 |
| 3. | "Marcas Do Meu Olhar" | 4:27 |
| 4. | "Njila" | 4:17 |
| 5. | "Insanidade Mental" | 3:41 |
| 6. | "Thought" | 4:00 |

Africa

=== Track list ===
| No. | Title | Length |
|---|---|---|
| 1. | "Ukina" | 5:18 |
| 2. | "Henda Mua Ngola" | 4:46 |
| 3. | "Quiseste" | 3:45 |
| 4. | "Mázui" | 6:40 |
| 5. | "Gibanu O Lu Kuaku Lue" | 4:55 |
| 6. | "Lina" | 3:44 |
| 7. | "Negro de Desejo" | 3:21 |
| 8. | "Flauta do Cantor" | 3:40 |
| 9. | "Africa" | 3:01 |
| 10. | "Muloji" | 3:27 |
| 11. | "Sem Intencão" | 5:23 |

== Awards and nominations ==
| Year | Organisation | Award | Work | Result |
|---|---|---|---|---|
| 2014 | XMA | Best Singer, songwriter | Insanidade Mental | Won |
| 2014 | XMA | Live performance | Insanidade Mental | Won |
| 2015 | StarAfrica Sound | Best Song | Africa | Nominated |
| 2015 | 58th Annual Grammy Awards | Best World Music Album | Africa | 1st round of the Ballots |
| 2016 | Angola Music Awards | Best Afro-Jazz | Flauta do Cantor | Nominated |
