= United Rugby Championship =

Annual rugby union competition in Europe and South Africa

- Current season or competition: 2026–27 United Rugby Championship
- Sport: Rugby union
- Formerly known as: Pro14; Pro12; Celtic League
- Instituted: 2001; 25 years ago
- Number of teams: 16
- Nations: Ireland (4 teams); Italy (2 teams); Scotland (2 teams); South Africa (4 teams); Wales (4 teams)
- Holders: Leinster (10th title) (2025–26)
- Most titles: Leinster (10 titles)
- Website: unitedrugby.com

The United Rugby Championship (URC) is an annual rugby union competition involving professional teams from Ireland, Italy, Scotland, South Africa and Wales. For sponsorship reasons the league is known as the Vodacom United Rugby Championship in South Africa, and the BKT United Rugby Championship in the competition's other territories, the split branding mirroring the format previously adopted in Super Rugby. The Championship represents the highest level of domestic club or franchise rugby in each of its constituent countries.

The Championship is one of the three major professional leagues in Europe (along with the English Premiership and the French Top 14), the most successful teams from which go forward to compete in the highest-level continental club competitions, the European Rugby Champions Cup and Challenge Cup. Since 2022–23 South African teams have been eligible to qualify for European competitions.

== Name ==
The tournament has had a number of names as it has grown, both organisationally and because of sponsors. The current name for the tournament was adopted in 2021, when the league expanded to include four South African teams previously from the SANZAR Super Rugby competition and both sets of naming rights, BKT and Vodacom, were added in the 2022–23 season.

The genesis of the League can be traced to 1999 when two Scottish districts joined the professional Welsh Premier Division, creating the Welsh–Scottish League, which does not form part of the continuity of the competition known as URC, but is the acknowledged precursor to it. When the Welsh-Scottish league was disbanded to create a similar competition with the provincial clubs from Ireland three years later, the new competition became known as the Celtic League The league was sponsored by Irish cider makers Magners from the 2006–07 season until 2010–11, and was referred to as the Magners League (or in the Republic of Ireland the Bulmer's League as the same sponsor traded under a different name there). At the start of the 2010–11 season, the league expanded from 10 to 12 teams, by adding two Italian teams, the first step outside the Celtic nations who had formed the league.

Following the end of Magners' sponsorship, the league adopted a Pro12 branding to acknowledge the move beyond the Celtic nations, with RaboDirect coming on board as naming sponsor of the Rabobank Pro12 from 2011–12 through to 2013–14. A further expansion to 14 teams (and the subsequent renaming to Pro14) took place from the 2017–18 season, with two South African teams not competing in the Super rugby competition joining the Championship until the 2019–20 season. The sponsorship deal with Guinness began at the beginning of the 2014–15 season as the Guinness Pro14, and concluded after the Guinness Pro14 Rainbow Cup in July 2021. Following the arrival of the four South African Super Rugby franchises (and the departure of the two existing South African teams) a further rebranding to the United Rugby Championship (or the URC for short) occurred, while the league formed a new partnership with Roc Nation. BKT and Vodacom secured naming rights the following season.

== Trophy ==
The URC trophy is named 'The Array', and was made in collaboration between British silversmiths Thomas Lyte, and design agency, Matter, in 2022. While the trophy's official name is 'The Array', it is also affectionately nicknamed 'the Beast' as it weighs around 20 kg (44 lb), making it the heaviest trophy in club rugby. It stands 68 cm tall.

== Tournament format ==
=== Current format ===
As of the introduction of the United Rugby Championship in 2021–22, the championship season has broadly had a consistent format. It takes place between September and May, with teams split into four regional pools: The Irish Shield pool, the Welsh Shield pool, the South African Shield pool and the Scottish and Italian Shield pool for the purpose of fixture setting.

Teams play each of the other teams in their pool twice (home and away) and each team from the other pools once (either home or away, alternating annually). This ensures that Irish, South African and Welsh teams each play six derby matches. For Italy and Scotland, their respective clubs play their own nations' sides only twice. All teams are sorted in a single league table. Championship points are awarded using the bonus points system; 4 points for a win and 2 for a draw. Bonus points can be earned so long as teams either score four or more tries in a game or lose by seven points or fewer – should a team do both, two bonus points are gained.

This creates an 18-match regular season before the play-offs, essentially a full single round robin with three additional 'derby ties' (or one extra derby and two extra Scottish-Italians ties in that pool).

The play-offs are made up of a seeded three round single-elimination tournament for the top eight teams. Teams are seeded 1–8 and the highest-seeded teams receive home advantage in every tie, including in the final. Prior to 2022, in common with the English Gallagher Premiership competition, the finals had been held in pre-arranged venues, although unlike the Premiership -where the final was fixed at Twickenham, the event still travelled between hosts.

As for European qualification, since the 2022-23 season, the South African teams are eligible for European competition. As of 2023, the top eight teams qualify for the Champions Cup, with the remaining teams qualifying for the Challenge Cup, subject to lower ranked URC teams claiming qualification for the Champions Cup by winning a European trophy.

With three fewer regular season fixtures than in the Pro14, but with an extra round of playoffs, the season is truncated slightly to 21 match weeks and thus can still be scheduled to the same time period as previous models of the competition. Clashes between league matches and international weekends in November and during the Six Nations Championship have been reduced.

Due to the travelling distance between Europe and South Africa, home South African games are always played on a Saturday, allowing visiting teams to have a seven-day turnaround between fixtures, including five "clean days" that do not involve any travel. Should the draw see European teams play both South African teams away, the schedule will see the away team play the two matches back-to-back across two weeks, acting as a "mini-tour" and reducing air travel and freight.

==== URC Regional Shields ====
On 24 September 2021, URC confirmed that the top side in each regional pool after the end of the 18-game regular season would be awarded a subsidiary trophy, a regional Shield. In Ireland, Wales and South Africa, this shield (the URC Irish Shield, URC Welsh Shield and URC South African Shield respectively) functions as an informal national championship title for the main professional sides, while in Scotland and Italy's shared pool, it will be a joint regional trophy. The concept is comparable to the Divisional Championships in the NFL which are also loosely geographically based. For the 2021–2022 and 2022–2023 seasons, the winners of each Shield were decided on the basis of all 18 regular season games played, and also guaranteed qualification for the European Rugby Champions Cup, regardless of their overall league position. However, since the start of the 2023–2024 season, this was no longer the case and the top eight teams in the league would qualify for Europe regardless of Shield position. In addition, the winners of the each Shield would be determined by the games played amongst the teams within their regional group, reaffirming its status as a specifically national and separate championship. In Scotland, the 'national' trophy is considered to be the 1872 Cup played exclusively between the two Scottish clubs, usually as a double header over the Christmas and New Year periods.

Derby games have become a tradition in all five member nations over this holiday period, with most home teams achieving bumper crowds for the matches. In Wales, a tradition has also arisen for a double-header Judgment Day event, involving all four Welsh clubs in two Welsh derbies back-to-back at the Principality Stadium. In Ireland and Scotland, certain derby games have been moved very successfully to the larger national stadia, or in the case of Connacht and Munster, to much larger local GAA grounds.

=== Format history ===
The league has used a play-off structure for most of its history, from its beginnings in 2001 until 2003, and again every year since the 2009–10 season to determine the champions, similar to that used in the English Premiership. For the first two seasons there were two groups and a knockout to determine a winner. Starting from the 2003–04 season until the 2008–09 season, the champions were determined from league performance, with all the teams in one league table. From 2009, the single league table was retained, but play-offs were reintroduced to crown a champion. From the 2017–18 season, when the competition expanded to fourteen teams, the regular season employed a conference structure rather than a single round robin league, with 'derby games' between teams from the same nation being protected, and an expanded playoff structure. This allowed the expanded competition to control the calendar, and control the number of games per team.

League points are awarded using the bonus points system. Until and including the 2008–09 season, the champions were decided solely on the basis of who finished top of the league table, but since the 2009–10 season, the league champion has been decided by a play-off series, in line with other rugby club competitions such as Super Rugby, Top 14, and the English Premiership: at the conclusion of the regular season, the top four placed teams enter the semi-final stage, with the winner of the first vs fourth and second vs third play-offs entering the final (known as the "grand final" in 2010 and 2011).

Two Italian teams – the former National Championship of Excellence team Benetton Treviso, and a new team, Aironi – joined the league starting with the 2010–11 season. Aironi was replaced by Zebre from the 2012–13 season. Through the 2012–13 season, the Welsh, Irish, Scottish and Italian rugby unions used the league as the sole determinant for Heineken Cup qualification, and from 2013–14 they use it as the sole means of qualification for the successor to the Heineken Cup, the European Rugby Champions Cup.

Two South African teams – Southern Kings and Cheetahs joined the competition in 2017 to create Pro14, while the four remaining professional franchises stayed in Super Rugby. The competition adopted a modified two-conference format rather than a full round-robin single table, with extra fixtures to maintain national derby matches. As weaker provinces, both South African teams struggled in the three years in which they took part, and were ineligible for European competition. The terminal financial difficulties at Southern Kings, and the COVID-19 pandemic effectively ended their participation in 2020, and there was no South African participation in the 2020 season, although the competition retained the Pro14 name.

Despite the difficulties, however, the competition proved attractive to the South African Rugby Football Union, due to shared time zones and reduced travelling, and the four major Super Rugby franchises – Stormers, Sharks, Bulls and Lions joined the renamed United Rugby Championship the following year, firstly through the transitional Pro14 Rainbow Cup, held in a split tournament format across Europe and South Africa, and then the United Rugby Championship, this time eligible for European competition. Ironically, Cheetahs, no longer in the URC, were invited to join the second-tier European competition, the EPCR Challenge Cup, as well, along with Georgian side, Black Lion from the Rugby Europe Super Cup. South African team, Stormers, won the first edition of URC in an all South African final, before being runner-up in the second season to Irish side, Munster.

Period	Sponsor	Name	Teams	Countries
2001–2002	no sponsor	Celtic League	15	Ireland, Scotland, Wales
2002–2003	no sponsor	Celtic League	16	Ireland, Scotland, Wales
2003–2004	no sponsor	Celtic League	12	Ireland, Scotland, Wales
2004–2006	no sponsor	Celtic League	11	Ireland, Scotland, Wales
2006–2007	Magners	Magners League	11	Ireland, Scotland, Wales
2007–2010	Magners	Magners League	10	Ireland, Scotland, Wales
2010–2011	Magners	Magners League	12	Ireland, Italy, Scotland, Wales
2011–2014	RaboDirect	RaboDirect Pro12	12	Ireland, Italy, Scotland, Wales
2014–2017	Guinness	Guinness Pro12	12	Ireland, Italy, Scotland, Wales
2017–2020	Guinness	Guinness PRO14	14	Ireland, Italy, Scotland, South Africa, Wales
2020–2021	Guinness	Guinness PRO14	12	Ireland, Italy, Scotland, Wales
2021	Guinness	Guinness PRO14 Rainbow Cup	16	Ireland, Italy, Scotland, South Africa, Wales
2021–2022	Vodacom (South Africa only) no sponsor (all other nations)	(Vodacom) United Rugby Championship	16	Ireland, Italy, Scotland, South Africa, Wales
2022–	Vodacom (South Africa only); BKT (all other nations)	Vodacom United Rugby Championship BKT United Rugby Championship	16	Ireland, Italy, Scotland, South Africa, Wales

== Corporate organisation ==
The legal name of the body running the competition is PRO Rugby Championship DAC, a private company limited by shares based in Ireland. The organisation is responsible for running and operating the URC and is currently owned equally by the Irish Rugby Football Union (IRFU), the Scottish Rugby Union (SRU) and the Welsh Rugby Union (WRU). The Italian Rugby Federation (FIR) may become a shareholder subject to it meeting certain conditions.

The board of Celtic Rugby DAC is made up of representatives from the IRFU, SRU, WRU, ProRugby Wales, the FIR and the South African Rugby Union. The chief executive is Martin Anayi.

In 2020 the championship received an investment from CVC Capital Partners who acquired a 28% share in the championship.

The organisation's headquarters are at Millbank House, Sandyford, Dublin 18.

== Media coverage ==
Starting in the 2010–11 season, the League was broadcast live on BBC Two Wales, BBC Two Northern Ireland, RTÉ, the Irish language channel TG4, the Scottish Gaelic channel BBC Alba, the Welsh language channel S4C. The BBC Two Wales matches were usually made available to the rest of the United Kingdom via BBC Red Button. Complete match replays were also available on the BBC iPlayer. Each broadcaster provided feeds to the others for matches in their home territory. While this meant that the league was now available free to air in the UK and Ireland, in Italy it was only available on a subscription basis in its first year.

Commencing from the 2014–15 season, Sky Sports became one of the league's broadcast partners, broadcasting 33 live games on a Saturday and also showing both the semi-finals and the final live. Its contract concluded at the end of 2017–18 season.

Also starting in the 2014–15 season, Italy's Nuvolari began broadcasting the games involving the two Italian clubs live on its digital free-to-view channel. Glasgow Warriors and Edinburgh matches were also broadcast live on BBC Radio Scotland.

From the 2018–19 season, coverage of the tournament was taken over by Premier Sports in the UK, EirSport in Ireland, DAZN in Italy, and Supersport in South Africa.

Coverage of the tournament can be found in other territories – on beIN Sports in France, and on various Setanta Sports channels around the globe (including Australia, New Zealand, Canada, South East Asia and the Middle East), as well as EuroSport.

=== Broadcast coverage history ===
Current broadcasters:

- URC TV (Ireland and other countries without broadcaster) (2021–present)
- TG4 (Ireland – Irish language) (2001–2004, 2010–present)
- Television New Zealand(2023–present)
- RTÉ Sport (Ireland) (2010–2014, 2021–2025)
- S4C (Wales – Welsh language) (2001–present)
- BBC Wales (2001–2018, 2021–2025)
- BBC Northern Ireland (2001–2004, 2010–2018, 2021–present)
- Eurosport (non-Core markets) (2016–present)
- DAZN (Germany) (2018–present)
- FloSports (USA) (2022–Present)
- Disney+ (Latin America) (2022–2025)
- SuperSport (South Africa) (2017–present)
- Premier Sports (UK and Ireland) (UK: 2018–present) (Ireland: 2021–present)
- Premier Sports Asia (2020–)
- SKY Sport Italy (2003, 2023–)

Past broadcasters:

- Sky Sports (2014–2018)
- eir sport (Ireland) (2018–2021)
- Setanta Sports (Live 2004–2010, Highlights 2010–2018)
- The Rugby Channel (2016–2018)
- beIN Sports (2014–2018)
- BBC Alba (2010–2018)
- BBC Scotland (UK)
- STV (Live 2009–2010, Highlights 2010–2013)
- Dahlia TV (2010–2011)
- Sportitalia (2012–2013)
- Nuvolari (2014–2015)
- RAI Sport (2011–2012, 2015–2016)
- DAZN (Italy, Canada) (2018–2021)
- Mediaset (Italy) (2013–2014, 2021–2022)
- Eurosport Italia: (2016–2018; 2022–2023)
- Setanta Sports (Asia) (2011–2020)
- ESPN (USA) (2018–2021)
- Spark Sport (2021–2023)

From 2004 to 2009, the Scottish and Irish rights were owned by Setanta Sports. Setanta closed down in Scotland in 2009, but Setanta Ireland and Setanta Sports 1 remained available to Irish subscribers. In 2010, RTÉ Sport, BBC Northern Ireland, TG4, BBC Wales, BBC Alba and SKY Italia came together to buy the Celtic League broadcasting rights.

On 2 May 2013, Sky Sports announced that it had agreed a four-year deal to broadcast 33 live matches each season. This deal commenced at the start of season 2014–15, Sky have 30 exclusive matches but are only allowed to cover one set of fixtures; for instance, only one Leinster v Munster match was live on Sky with the other on TG4. Regional screening of matches continued, BBC Wales show Scrum V Live on Friday Night with S4C covering a match now on Sunday afternoons. BBC Alba also screened matches, with some also available in English on BBC Scotland, although BBC Alba did offer English language commentary via their Red Button service when the match was not shown on BBC Scotland. BBC Northern Ireland screened all Ulster matches not available on Sky Sports. RTÉ Sport dropped their coverage after the 2014 final due to budget cuts, making TG4 the only broadcasters of the competition in the Republic of Ireland. The semi-finals and finals are available to all broadcasters.

On 31 August 2017, SuperSport announced that it had acquired the rights to broadcast matches within South Africa.

On 30 April 2018, PRO14 Rugby signed a partnership with Premier Sports and FreeSports to broadcast every Pro14 game live in high definition across the UK for at least the next three years. The agreement, which came into effect for the 2018–19 season, also saw at least one match per round shown live free-to-air on FreeSports.

== Teams ==
The league is based on regionalised, provincial and franchise representation of the participating nations, except for Benetton which represents the city of Treviso itself. Benetton was selected for its long history after the project of a second Italian regional team, Praetorians Roma, failed. Zebre Parma replaced an earlier franchise Aironi in Italy. South Africa and Ireland use explicitly provincial structures, the former operating on a franchise system. Both countries have long organised domestic and representative rugby on a provincial basis going back decades. Wales employs a more recent regional structure, but built on an original club foundation where regions originally represented a combination of local premiership clubs, while Scotland employs the opposite, a 'two city club' system where each of the clubs maps over a previous regional team. A third Scottish regional team, Border Reivers and a fifth Welsh regional-club team Celtic Warriors, were wound down by the respective unions early in the competition's history, while Cheetahs and Southern Kings left prior to the URC rebranding, with Cheetahs surviving to compete as an invitee team in the European Rugby Challenge Cup and Kings being wound down for insolvency.

Location of United Rugby Championship teams in the United Kingdom: Northern Ireland Scotland Wales Location of United Rugby Championship teams in Italy	Location of United Rugby Championship teams on the island of Ireland, in the IRFU jurisdiction: Republic of Ireland Northern Ireland Location of United Rugby Championship teams in South Africa

United Rugby Championship clubs

Club	Established	Joined	Location	Stadium(s)	Surface	Capacity	Titles (last)
(Italy) Benetton	1932	2010	Treviso, Italy	Stadio Comunale di Monigo	Grass	6,700	0*
(South Africa) Bulls	1938	2021	Pretoria, South Africa	Loftus Versfeld Stadium	Grass	51,762	0
(Wales) Cardiff Rugby	2003	2003	Cardiff, Wales	Cardiff Arms Park	3G Artificial	12,125	0
(Ireland) Connacht	1885	2001	Galway, Ireland	Dexcom Stadium	3G Artificial	12,000	1 (2016)
(Wales) Dragons	2003	2003	Newport, Wales	Rodney Parade	Hybrid	8,700	0
(Scotland) Edinburgh	1872	2001	Edinburgh, Scotland	Edinburgh Rugby Stadium	3G Artificial	7,800	0
(Scotland) Glasgow Warriors	1872	2001	Glasgow, Scotland	Scotstoun Stadium	3G Artificial	9,708	2 (2024)
(Ireland) Leinster	1879	2001	Dublin, Ireland	Aviva Stadium; RDS Arena	Grass	51,700; 20,600	10 (2026)
(South Africa) Lions	1889	2021	Johannesburg, South Africa	Ellis Park Stadium	Grass	62,567	0
(Ireland) Munster	1879	2001	Cork, Ireland; Limerick, Ireland	Musgrave Park; Thomond Park	3G Artificial; Grass	8,008; 25,600	4 (2023)
(Wales) Ospreys	2003	2003	Swansea, Wales	St Helen's	3G Artificial	8,000	4 (2012)
(Wales) Scarlets	2003	2003	Llanelli, Wales	Parc y Scarlets	Hybrid	14,870	2 (2017)
(South Africa) Sharks	1890	2021	Durban, South Africa	Kings Park Stadium	Grass	52,000	0
(South Africa) Stormers	1883	2021	Cape Town, South Africa	Cape Town Stadium	Grass	55,000	1 (2022)
(Ireland) Ulster	1879	2001	Belfast, Northern Ireland	Ravenhill Stadium	3G Artificial	18,196	1 (2006)
(Italy) Zebre Parma	1973	2012	Parma, Italy	Stadio Sergio Lanfranchi	Grass	5,000	0

- In 2021, Benetton Rugby won the Pro14 Rainbow Cup, a transitional 'spring league' conference-based tournament that took place between the Pro14 and URC incarnations of the competition. The victory is recognised as an official URC title for the Italians, the first ever won by a team from that country, but is not recognised as part of the annual continuity of the main tournament league.

=== Italian teams join (2010) ===
The Celtic League board met in November 2008 to explore the possibility of Italian participation; the chief executive of the Welsh Rugby Union, Roger Lewis, stated that the league was looking "favourably" on Italian participation. Following a 19 December 2008 board meeting of the Italian Rugby Federation (FIR) to discuss proposals to improve Italian rugby, FIR announced that it would submit a proposal to join the Celtic League.

FIR had two possibilities – either entering four existing Italian clubs from the National Championship of Excellence into the league; or creating two teams of Italy-qualified players exclusively for the competition. On 18 July 2009, the FIR announced that Aironi and Praetorians Roma would compete in the Celtic League from the start of the 2010–11 season – beating bids from Benetton Treviso and Duchi Nord-Ovest. Praetorians would be based in Rome at the Stadio Flaminio, while Aironi would be based in Viadana but would play some matches in the city of Reggio Emilia. On 2 October 2009, the FIR proposed Benetton Treviso in place of Praetorians Roma.

On 28 January 2010, the FIR declared that they had withdrawn from negotiations with the Celtic League regarding two Italian teams joining the tournament, with the main issue being a €3 million warranty asked for by the league, but by 7 February, the Italian clubs had come up with the required funding. By 8 March 2010, a deal had been finalised for Aironi and Benetton Treviso to enter the Celtic League from the 2010–11 season, with each team guaranteed a place in the Heineken Cup.

At the end of the 2011–12 season, however, Aironi were no longer available to compete in future competitions as a regional club, as, on 6 April 2012, they were refused a licence to continue on financial grounds. They were replaced by another Italian side, Zebre (now Zebre Parma).

=== Former teams ===
Thirty separate teams have taken part in the various versions of the Championship. Of the fourteen teams no longer involved, nine were Welsh premiership clubs, replaced by five new regions. One of those Welsh regions, two South African franchises, one Scottish region and one Italian franchise make up the rest of the historic teams. Only the four Irish provinces and the original Scottish regions have been ever present (Cardiff Rugby, Scarlets, Ospreys and Dragons have changed their names). Of the fourteen, eight of the nine Welsh clubs and Cheetahs continue to compete in other competitions. Ireland has never entered a new team nor withdrawn a team since their entry to the competition.

Team	Years	Location	Stadium(s) (capacity)
(Italy) Aironi	2010–12	Viadana, Italy	Stadio Luigi Zaffanella (6,000)
(Scotland) Border Reivers	2002–07	Galashiels, Scotland	Netherdale (6,000)
(Wales) Bridgend Ravens	2001–03	Bridgend, Wales	Brewery Field (6,000)
(Wales) Caerphilly	2001–03	Caerphilly, Wales	Virginia Park (5,000)
(Wales) Cardiff RFC	2001–03	Cardiff, Wales	Cardiff Arms Park (12,500)
(Wales) Celtic Warriors	2003–04	Bridgend, Wales; Pontypridd, Wales	Brewery Field (12,000); Sardis Road (8,000)
(South Africa) Cheetahs	2017–20	Bloemfontein, South Africa	Free State Stadium (48,000)
(Wales) Ebbw Vale	2001–03	Ebbw Vale, Wales	Eugene Cross Park (8,000)
(Wales) Llanelli	2001–03	Llanelli, Wales	Stradey Park (10,800)
(Wales) Neath	2001–03	Neath, Wales	The Gnoll (6,000)
(Wales) Newport	2001–03	Newport, Wales	Rodney Parade (11,676)
(Wales) Pontypridd	2001–03	Pontypridd, Wales	Sardis Road (7,861)
(South Africa) Southern Kings	2017–20	Port Elizabeth, South Africa	Nelson Mandela Bay Stadium (48,459)
(Wales) Swansea	2001–03	Swansea, Wales	St Helen's Rugby and Cricket Ground (4,500)

Notes:

- Before regionalisation, Wales was represented by nine Welsh Premiership clubs from 2001 to 2003. Following this they were replaced with five regional clubs, of which Celtic Warriors only lasted a single season.
- The Border Reivers, added in 2002, were disbanded by the Scottish Rugby Union in 2007 as part of cost-cutting measures.
- Aironi was replaced by Zebre in 2012, meaning that the number of Italian teams remained at two.
- The two South African clubs Cheetahs and Southern Kings exited the league in 2020 as a result of travel restrictions due to the COVID-19 pandemic.

=== Other nations ===
After the successful negotiations with Italy, talks were held intermittently with South Africa about the possible expansion of the Pro12. A 24-team Rainbow Cup involving 11 Celtic, 9 South African and 4 Italian teams was announced in 2005, but the idea was abandoned because of financial issues on the European end of the deal and changes in the leadership of the South African Rugby Union (SARU).

In February 2009, South Africa was rumoured to be negotiating entry of its current Super Rugby teams into the Celtic League, to take effect when the media contract between SANZAR and News Corporation expires after the 2010 season; these rumours were immediately denied by SA Rugby, the commercial arm of SARU. In the end, nothing came of these rumours, and the competition remained a strictly European affair.

In a 2016 interview with The Irish Times, IRFU CEO Philip Browne indicated that the Pro12 was seriously considering establishing a US franchise on the country's Atlantic coast in the near future, seeing the recent growth of the sport in the US as an opportunity to help close some of the financial gap between Pro12 and Europe's two major domestic leagues, the English Premiership and France's Top 14. Browne added that Pro12 was also looking to expand further into Continental Europe by teaming with major association football clubs, some of which already have rugby sections.

In August 2016, Pro12 officials began talks with the unions of both Canada and the United States about expansion before the end of the decade, with interest in putting teams on the east coasts of both countries.

In October 2026, the President of the Spanish Rugby Federation, Juan Carlos Martin Sanchez, expressed his desire for a Spanish team to join the URC and said talks were ongoing with the league amid a bid from Spain to host the 2035 Rugby World Cup.

=== South Africa (2021) ===
Media attention turned in 2017 toward a new possibility of South African teams entering the competition. Following the decision of Super Rugby organiser SANZAAR to drop three teams from the competition (two from South Africa), multiple media reports indicated that the two likeliest South African sides to be axed, the Cheetahs and Southern Kings, could be added to Pro12 as early as the 2017–18 season. A later BBC report indicated that the Cheetahs and Kings would be added once their removal from Super Rugby was formally announced on 7 July, though neither Celtic Rugby Limited, the South African Rugby Union, nor the two teams would comment on the report. A week after the Cheetahs and Kings' departure from Super Rugby was confirmed, the BBC reported that Celtic Rugby Limited was expected to officially add those teams at the organisation's next board meeting on 18 July. While no announcement came on that date, media in both South Africa and Britain reported that SARU's chief executive was at Celtic Rugby's headquarters in Dublin to finalise the addition of the Cheetahs and Kings, with Reuters calling the expansion "the worst kept secret in rugby". The addition of the two South African teams was officially confirmed on 1 August 2017. The Southern Kings entered liquidation in September 2020 and therefore withdrew from the league.

In September 2020, the league confirmed they were looking for a replacement team for Southern Kings and possible expansion to more teams in South Africa to enter the league in 2021. Later that month, SA rugby voted that their Super Rugby sides (Lions, Stormers, Sharks, Bulls) would enter the Pro 14 to replace the liquidated Kings and the Cheetahs, who were withdrawn before the 2021 season.

== Current standings ==
Pos	Team	Pld	W	D	L	PF	PA	PD	TF	TA	TB	LB	Pts	Qualification
1	Glasgow Warriors	5	4	1	0	148	112	+36	22	15	5	0	23	Qualification for the Champions Cup and knockout stage
2	Bulls	5	4	0	1	214	106	+108	31	15	4	1	21	Qualification for the Champions Cup and knockout stage
3	Stormers	5	4	0	1	166	101	+65	24	14	4	1	21	Qualification for the Champions Cup and knockout stage
4	Sharks	5	4	0	1	140	107	+33	20	16	3	0	19	Qualification for the Champions Cup and knockout stage
5	Edinburgh	5	4	0	1	123	95	+28	17	12	3	0	19	Qualification for the Champions Cup and knockout stage
6	Leinster	5	3	0	2	149	81	+68	23	11	4	2	18	Qualification for the Champions Cup and knockout stage
7	Cardiff	5	3	0	2	113	107	+6	17	17	2	0	14	Qualification for the Champions Cup and knockout stage
8	Dragons	5	2	1	2	137	128	+9	20	20	3	1	14	Qualification for the Champions Cup and knockout stage
9	Ospreys	5	2	0	3	112	147	−35	18	21	3	0	11	Qualification for the Challenge Cup
10	Benetton	5	1	1	3	115	104	+11	16	17	2	3	11	Qualification for the Challenge Cup
11	Connacht	5	2	0	3	109	161	−52	18	24	2	0	10	Qualification for the Challenge Cup
12	Munster	5	1	1	3	93	113	−20	12	17	2	2	10	Qualification for the Challenge Cup
13	Lions	5	2	0	3	107	162	−55	15	25	1	0	9	Qualification for the Challenge Cup
14	Scarlets	5	1	0	4	134	191	−57	20	29	4	1	9	Qualification for the Challenge Cup
15	Ulster	5	0	2	3	121	160	−39	18	22	4	1	9	Qualification for the Challenge Cup
16	Zebre	5	0	0	5	93	199	−106	14	30	2	0	2	Qualification for the Challenge Cup

Updated to match(es) played on 2nd November 2026. Source: UnitedRugby.com
Rules for classification: Tiebreakers for teams tied on points: 1) Number of matches won 2) The difference between points for and points against 3) The number of tries scored 4) The most points scored 5) The difference between tries for and tries against 6) The fewest red cards received 7) The fewest yellow cards received.

== History ==
=== Formative years and the Welsh-Scottish League ===
Pan-Celtic tournaments were proposed throughout the early professional era, with the creation of the Heineken Cup in 1995 demonstrating that inter-domestic competitions were financially viable. From 1995 onwards, the Welsh Rugby Union (WRU), Scottish Rugby Union (SRU) and Irish Rugby Football Union (IRFU) discussed a number of Celtic league and cup competitions, discussions were also held with the Rugby Football Union (RFU) to form a British & Irish league. These discussions eventually led the WRU and the RFU to establish the Anglo-Welsh Cup in 2005, and all four unions to establish the British and Irish Cup in 2009.

The first material steps toward a Celtic league were taken before the 1999–2000 season, when the Scottish districts Edinburgh and Glasgow were formally invited to join the fully professional Welsh Premier Division, creating the Welsh–Scottish League. By 2001, an agreement was made with the Irish Rugby Football Union (IRFU) to bring in the four Irish provinces. The 2001–02 season saw additional matches and a new league structure played alongside the continuing Welsh–Scottish League and the Inter-Provincial Championship in Ireland. The new format was named the Celtic League. The Celtic League had developed by 2005, and the tournament became the sole professional league in Ireland and Scotland (the Anglo-Welsh Cup and semi-pro Welsh Premiership continued in Wales) and had entirely replaced both the Welsh–Scottish League, and the Inter-Provincial Championship.

=== Celtic League (2001–2011) ===
==== 2001–02 ====
The Celtic League Logo

The first full season of a pan-Celtic competition saw 15 teams compete: the four Irish provinces (Connacht, Leinster, Munster and Ulster), two Scottish teams (Edinburgh Reivers and Glasgow) and all nine Welsh professional teams (Bridgend, Caerphilly, Cardiff RFC, Ebbw Vale, Llanelli, Neath, Newport, Pontypridd and Swansea).

Played alongside each country's own domestic competitions, the teams were split into two groups (of eight and seven) and played a series of round-robin matches with each team playing the other only once. The top four teams from each group proceeded into the knock-out phase until a champion was found. Clashes between teams in the Welsh–Scottish League also counted towards the new competition.

The 2001–02 competition was dominated by the Irish teams with all four sides reaching the last eight, three progressing to the semi-finals, and the thrilling final played at Lansdowne Road contested between Leinster and Munster with Leinster running out 24–20 winners.

==== 2002–03 ====
Champions Leinster failed to make the quarter-final stage in 2003. In their absence, Munster went on to win the competition by beating Connacht 33–3 in the quarter-finals, Ulster 42–10 in the semi-finals, and Neath 37–17 in the final played in Cardiff.

The format of the Celtic League remained the same for the second season, but saw the addition of a third Scottish district, the newly re-established Scottish Borders. However, the Welsh-Scottish league structure ended permanently in 2002, allowing for the expansion of the Celtic league format in the following season.

==== 2003–04 ====
A major change in Celtic League came before the start of the 2003–04 season. The Welsh Rugby Union voted to create five new regional sides (Cardiff Blues, Celtic Warriors, Llanelli Scarlets, Neath–Swansea Ospreys and Newport Gwent Dragons). It was agreed that the Celtic League would become the sole professional league of the three countries, incorporating the four Irish, three Scottish and five new Welsh professional teams.

Reformatted into a traditional league competition (double round-robin style, all clubs play each other twice, once home, once away), which meant that a season long 22-round match program was launched, and with a new strength in depth due to the amalgamation of Welsh teams and the continuing strengthening of Irish and Scottish teams through the re-signing and retention of star players, the league has been in rugby terms a success. Also introduced for the 2003–04 season was the Celtic Cup, a straight knock-out cup competition between the 12 Celtic League teams.

However, the unfortunate timing of the league's launch and poor organisation of a working calendar meant that first the 2003 Rugby World Cup and later the Six Nations Championship prevented many of the league's top stars from playing in over half the games. This caused the league to struggle commercially, especially regarding the newly adopted regions in Wales where the game has always traditionally been played on a club basis, not having the regional histories of Ireland or Scotland. The season ended with the Llanelli Scarlets running out as eventual winners, four points ahead of Ulster.

==== 2004–05 ====
The Welsh Rugby Union controversially purchased and liquidated the Celtic Warriors so that the 2004–05 season saw eleven teams compete in the Celtic League. The new format took the league into what many saw as a make-or-break season, clear of massive distractions such as the Rugby World Cup. With the Welsh regions partly embedded, the signs were that the Celtic League would be a competition that could continue. It was suggested that Italian sides might join an expanded Celtic League, an idea that eventually happened in 2010.

The league format was further refined at the end of the 2003–04 season, with the participants better managing the dates of the matches so as to not interfere with the national squad set-ups and to make the league more commercially viable. The league was played until April, and then the Celtic Cup was contested among the top eight teams.

The 2004–05 season was the first season that Ireland agreed to use the Celtic League standings to determine which provinces would enter the Heineken Cup. The IRFU had previously classed Connacht as a "development" team and so nominated Leinster, Munster and Ulster over Connacht. The IRFU also insisted on International squad training sessions taking precedence over Celtic League matches, with Irish provinces (especially Munster and Leinster) occasionally fielding virtual second teams for Celtic League games. Some claimed this had the effect of devaluing the competition. However, despite this approach, Munster finished second and Leinster third, with Munster winning the Celtic Cup. The Ospreys topped the league table, making it two in a row for Welsh regional sides.

==== 2005–06 ====
In 2005, there were discussions over a potential Anglo-Welsh Cup competition which some saw as undermining the Celtic League. Despite Welsh assurances that the proposed Anglo-Welsh tournament would not interfere with their commitments to either the Celtic League in its present format or an expanded 'Rainbow League', the WRU made arrangements to play games on five weekends that clashed with Celtic League fixtures. The SRU and IRFU then threatened to expel the Welsh sides from the Celtic League in June 2005. It was proposed that the competition would continue as a Scottish and Irish affair for the 2005–06 season, with the possible addition of four Italian sides and the re-admittance of Welsh sides for the 2006–07 season. However a deal was reached that allowed for the Celtic League to continue with the Anglo-Welsh cup fixtures involving Welsh clubs rescheduled.

Despite these problems, the league enjoyed its most successful season, with the record attendance at a Celtic League match being broken four times, from 12,436 at the match between the Cardiff Blues and the Newport Gwent Dragons in December to 15,327 for the match between the Cardiff Blues and Leinster at the Millennium Stadium. The total attendances for the season were up nearly 50,000 at 571,331 compared to 521,449 for the previous season.

The league went down to the last round with Ulster and Leinster both in contention. Following Leinster's victory over Edinburgh and with Ulster losing against the Ospreys, it looked like the cup would go to Dublin but David Humphreys kicked a last-minute drop goal from 40 metres to clinch the game and the league for Ulster.

==== 2006–07 ====
In May 2006, Magners Irish Cider were named as the competition sponsors for the next five seasons, and the league was renamed as the Magners League. Although known as Bulmers Irish Cider in the Republic of Ireland, the Magners brand name was used there for the league. The sponsorship followed on from Magners' previous sponsorship deals with Edinburgh and the London Wasps.

The Scottish Rugby Union announced that the Borders territory would be disbanded from the end of the 2006–07 season. It may be revived when the Scottish Rugby Union debt decreases enough to make it financially viable along with a possible fourth Scottish territory (four professional teams being the original plan for the SRU) with Falkirk, Stirling or a London-based team being possible locations; or even the Caledonia Reds, the forgotten Scottish region. In the meantime Scotland would have only two professional teams based in Edinburgh and Glasgow.

The league's record attendance was smashed in this season with a full house at Lansdowne Road (48,000) for Leinster v Ulster. This was the last game in the stadium prior to its demolition, and was billed as "The Last Stand".

The league was won by the Ospreys on the final day of fixtures. The Blues' home win over Leinster allowed the Ospreys to top the league by a single point and take the title with an away win at Borders.

==== 2007–08 ====
Only ten teams competed in the 2007–08 season, after the Borders were disbanded at the end of the 2006–07 season. Glasgow Warriors moved their home games to Firhill. After missing out on the title on the last day for the previous two seasons, Leinster finally won the 2007–08 title with one game remaining. They had been runaway leaders for much of the season.

In April 2008 it was announced that the Celtic League was to introduce a play-off system commencing in the 2009–10 season to determine the winner, thus generating a greater climax to the season and bringing it in line with other major leagues such as the English Premiership and French Top 14.

==== 2008–09 ====
The 2008–09 season was decided quite early in the season as Munster claimed the title without playing, as they were preparing for their Heineken Cup semi-final against Leinster. The final challenge from Ospreys was snuffed out when the Dragons denied them a bonus point win on 30 April. Munster had led pretty much from the start of the season with a team largely captained by Mick O'Driscoll showing Munster's squad depth. Munster lost only four games, three to the other Irish teams, including a double loss to Ulster. Felipe Contepomi finished as league top scorer for Leinster, the year they went on to win the Heineken Cup.

==== 2009–10 ====
The 2009–10 season was the last 10-team league as the Italian teams joined in 2010–11. The league was one of the most competitive in years with perennial wooden-spooners Connacht challenging Ulster all the way for the third Irish Heineken Cup spot. Ulster needed a superb away bonus point win at Edinburgh to seal it, ending Edinburgh's own play-off hopes. Scarlets had a disappointing campaign as typical Welsh underdogs the Dragons had a great season, eventually finishing mid table and comfortably qualifying for the Heineken Cup. Luckily for the Scarlets, Cardiff Blues won the Amlin Cup and thereby earned Wales an extra Heineken Cup place. 2009–10 was also the first time a play-off was used to decide the champion, previously the top team at the end of the season was champion. The Scottish teams and particularly Glasgow came of age and had a fine season, finishing third in the end.

The four qualifiers for the play-offs were Leinster, Ospreys, Glasgow and Munster in that order, each country having at least one team. In the semi-finals Leinster defeated Munster at the RDS, after Ospreys overcame Glasgow in Swansea. In the 2010 Celtic League Grand Final at the RDS in Dublin the Ospreys shocked Leinster, winning the title 17–12 with their first win in Dublin in five years.

==== 2010–11 ====
The 2010–11 saw the introduction of the two Italian sides, Aironi and Benetton Treviso. In the new 12 team format, the play-offs came down to Munster hosting the Ospreys in one semi-final, and Leinster hosting Ulster in the other.

The two home sides went on to win their respective matches and the final was held in Thomond Park, home of Munster rugby, where they defeated Leinster (who had just been crowned champions of Europe a week earlier).

=== The Pro12 (2011–2017) ===
==== 2011–12 ====
The 2011–12 season saw a re-branding of the competition as the RaboDirect Pro12. Leinster were the runaway winners of the regular season, with a 10-point cushion over the Ospreys in second. The top four were Leinster, Ospreys, Munster and Warriors in that order. Ospreys easily overcame Munster at home in the first semi-final in Swansea while Leinster beat the Glasgow Warriors in the RDS after giving up a strong lead. In the final, also held at the RDS, Leinster were aiming to become the first Celtic League team to complete a domestic and European double, after beating Ulster the previous week in the Heineken Cup final. After trailing for most of the game, Ospreys took a late lead through a try by Shane Williams. Dan Biggar then landed a difficult conversion to give Ospreys their fourth title by a single point, 31–30.

After two years in the competition Aironi played their final match, as their licence to compete was revoked by the FIR for financial reasons.

==== 2012–13 ====
With the demise of Aironi they were replaced with a new FIR controlled team to be based in Parma called Zebre, near the Aironi base in Viadana. The Welsh clubs chose to operate under a new self-imposed salary cap, which led to a number of departures from the Welsh teams as they strove to balance their books. Some high-profile Welsh players moved to the French Top 14, but other Pro12 teams also benefited with the likes of Casey Laulala going to Munster from Cardiff Blues, Sean Lamont to Glasgow from Scarlets, Dan Parks from Cardiff Blues to Connacht and Tommy Bowe from Ospreys back to Ulster.

Ulster topped the table in the regular season, with Leinster, Glasgow and Scarlets completing the top 4 in that order. They then went on to comfortably beat Scarlets 28–17 in Belfast, while Leinster were hard pressed by Glasgow in a tense 17–15 win for the hosts. In the final (held in the R.D.S. due to redevelopment of Ravenhill) Leinster prevailed 24–18 to win their 3rd title.

==== 2013–14 ====
Rabo Direct announced that this was to be their last season as sponsors. This, combined with the ongoing uncertainty surrounding the future of the European Cup, meant that there were concerns over the future commercial viability of the tournament. However, despite all off-field issues it was a successful season with a new high for both total attendance and for a single game (51,700 for Leinster v Munster).

In the end Leinster topped the table, having led for most of the season. Glasgow had a late surge to finish 2nd overtaking Munster and Ulster in the process. All four teams showed they were worthy contenders in the next round with Leinster needing to score a late try to beat Ulster 13–9 in Dublin while Glasgow just got past Munster in Scotstoun by one point to win 16–15. The final in the R.D.S. was also a close game for most of the match with Leinster forced to defend for long periods. However they eventually pulled clear, adding two late scores which made the final result look somewhat lopsided at 34–12.

==== 2014–15 ====
The RaboDirect title sponsor was replaced by Guinness. With the Heineken Cup being replaced by the 20-team European Rugby Champions Cup in the 2014–15 season, the Pro12 table had a greater impact on qualification. Under the previous format, the Pro12 provided a minimum of 10 teams, with Scotland and Italy providing two teams each, and Ireland and Wales both providing three. The new system saw a total of seven teams, with one place now being reserved for the highest-finishing Pro12 team from each of four participating countries and three other qualifiers based solely on league position. The other teams were entered in the new second-tier competition, the European Rugby Challenge Cup.

Leinster were the defending champions having beaten Glasgow Warriors in the previous season's playoff final, to become the first team in the league to successfully retain the trophy. Leinster were unable to defend their title as they failed to qualify for the end-of-season playoffs for the top four teams after the regular season. Glasgow Warriors finished the regular season on top of the table, and were crowned champions for the first time, beating second seeded team Munster 31–13 in the final. Thus, the Warriors became the first Scottish team to win a professional trophy, beating Edinburgh's appearance in the final of the 2014–15 European Rugby Challenge Cup.

==== 2015–16 ====
With the 2015 Rugby World Cup taking place during the opening months of the season, changes were made to the usual fixture schedule to minimise the effect on teams who released players to take part. The low number of games in the opening weeks of the season led to fixture congestion at the end of the tournament, with each team playing a game every weekend for 16 weeks straight from October 2015 to January 2016, including European matches.

As in the previous season, qualification to the European Champions Cup was guaranteed to the top team from each country participating in the league, with the three highest placed team's not already qualified also earning a berth. Unlike in the previous season where the 20th tournament spot was decided by a play-off involving teams from the Pro12, France's Top 14 and the English Premiership, due to fixture congestion from the World Cup, the final spot in the tournament was reserved for the winner of the 2015 European Challenge Cup if not already qualified.

The delayed start to the season, and absence of established international players during international Test and Six Nations windows, arguably gave some advantage to 'lesser' teams, and Connacht, coached by Pat Lam, duly led the league for much of the season. Despite not ultimately finishing top of the league, they converted their form into a maiden championship title in the post-league play-off matches, including a home semi-final victory over reigning champions Glasgow Warriors, and the Pro12 Final against league-topping Leinster at the neutral venue of Murrayfield Stadium in Edinburgh.

==== 2016–17 ====
Despite losing their first three matches, the Scarlets finished third in the league. They became the first team in the Pro 12's history to win an away semi-final, beating Leinster 27–15 at the RDS Arena, before beating league-topping Munster 46–22 at the Aviva Stadium. Scarlets wing Steff Evans ended up as the league's top try scorer with 11 tries.

=== The Pro14 Championship (2017–2021) ===
==== 2017–18 ====
Big changes happened this season with the addition of two South African teams and a change from a league format of home and away to a conference structure championship. The 14 teams were split into two conferences of seven teams each. They play each team in their own conference twice (12 games) and each team in the other conference once (7 games), plus two derby games against the team(s) in the other conference from their own country, making 21 matches in total. The team that finishes top in each conference qualifies directly, one for each of the semi-finals, while the teams that finish second and third in each conference qualify as the four quarter-finalists to determine the other two semi-finalists.

Leinster would regain the title at the Aviva Stadium in Dublin and would become the first Pro14 side to ever win a European and Domestic double, they did so by beating previous holders Scarlets in a high scoring affair, 40–32. The two sides had already met in the European Semi-Final only a few weeks prior to the playoff final in very similar circumstances, at the same stadium and with much of the same lineup either side. It was Leinsters fifth domestic title.

==== 2018–19 ====
The two conference format continued this season. The top three eligible European teams in each conference automatically qualified for following year's Champions Cup. The fourth ranked eligible team in each conference met in a play-off match with the winner taking the seventh Champions Cup place. As Leinster lost the Champions Cup final on 11 May 2019, Ospreys hosted Scarlets in the play-off on 18 May 2019. Ospreys secured the sole Wales Champions Cup place for following season by defeating Scarlets 21–10. The Pro14 final was played between Glasgow Warriors and Leinster and was played at Celtic Park in Glasgow. Leinster won the game 18–15 to retain the title.

==== 2019–20 ====
All teams played their normal schedule until round 13 after which an additional two rounds of derby matches were played by the 12 European teams. The Southern Kings announced in August 2020 that they had voluntarily withdrawn from the league for the remainder of 2020. The top four eligible European teams in both conferences automatically qualify for the 2020–21 European Rugby Champions Cup. (The South African teams did not compete in the Champions Cup.) Qualification was based on league position after round 13. The grand final match was due to be held at Cardiff City Stadium, however, on 19 March 2020, Celtic Rugby DAC cancelled the event due to the COVID-19 pandemic. The re-arranged match took place on 12 September 2020 at the Aviva Stadium between defending champions Leinster and Ulster. Leinster won the match 27–5 to defend their title and complete a hat-trick of title wins.

==== 2020–21 ====
Twelve teams competed in this season — four Irish teams: Connacht, Leinster, Munster and Ulster; two Italian teams: Benetton and Zebre; two Scottish teams: Edinburgh and Glasgow Warriors; and four Welsh teams: Cardiff Blues, Dragons, Ospreys and Scarlets. Neither of the two South African teams competed this season, with the Cheetahs unable to compete due to the COVID-19 pandemic, and the Southern Kings having entered into voluntary liquidation due to heavy financial losses.

Due to the delays experienced during the 2019–20 season as a result of the COVID-19 pandemic, the 2020–21 season started later than usual on 2 October 2020. Leinster won their fourth consecutive Pro14 title and 8th overall defeating Munster in the grand final on 27 March.

=== Rainbow Cup ===
The 2020–21 Pro14 was reduced to twelve teams as the two South African teams – the Cheetahs and Southern Kings – were not allowed to travel internationally in 2020 due to the COVID-19 pandemic. In September 2020, the Southern Kings ceased operations and the South African Rugby Union council began exploring the possibility of the four South African former Super Rugby teams – the Bulls, Lions, Sharks and Stormers – joining an expanded Pro14. PRO14 Rugby announced in December 2020 that the 2020–21 Pro14 regular season would conclude after 16 rounds, and the top team from each conference would advance to a final in March 2021. The Pro14 Rainbow Cup then commenced in April and introduced the four new South African teams. The first-placed teams from each tournament, Benetton and Bulls, played in the final in Treviso. Benetton won 35–8 in front of their home crowd for a historic first win of an international competition for any Italian club.

=== United Rugby Championship ===
==== 2021–22 ====
The tournament consisted of 18 rounds of regular season play, and three rounds of play-offs. There were four regional pools: The Irish Shield pool (featuring the four Irish teams), the Welsh Shield pool (featuring the four Welsh teams), the South African Shield pool (featuring the four South African teams) and the Scottish/Italian 'Azzurri/Blue' Shield pool (featuring the two Italian and two Scottish sides). Teams play six matches against their regional pool rivals home and away. The remaining twelve matches are made up by a single round robin, consisting of an even number of six home and six away matches against all the sides from the other pools.

The first United Rugby Championship Final was an all-South African derby, ensuring the first ever South African winner of the tournament, the Bulls having narrowly missed out on winning the transitional Pro14 Rainbow Cup competition. It also marked the first time in the history of the competition that a Grand final play-off match has not included at least one Irish province, a run of 14 finals. The Stormers defeated the Bulls 18–13 in Cape Town.

==== 2022–23 ====
The tournament consisted of 21 rounds; 18 rounds of regular season play, followed by three rounds of play-offs. The final, held on 27 May 2023, saw Munster defeat defending champions the Stormers by a score of 19–14.

==== 2023–24 ====
The tournament again consisted of 21 rounds; 18 rounds of regular season play, followed by three rounds of play-offs. The final, saw Glasgow Warriors defeat Bulls 21-16 for their second title, and Scotland's first win in the new URC format. For the third successive year, the final was held in South Africa.

==== 2024-25 ====
With the now settled format, the final left South Africa as, for the first time in the URC era, the top two seeds both made the final. Top seeds Leinster won a record ninth title, but their first of the URC era, with a comprehensive win over the Bulls 32-7 in Croke Park, the third final defeat in four years for the South Africans. Leinster became the first team to both top the regular season table, and then win the Grand Final as number one seeds in the URC era.

== Results ==
Since its inception, the competition has been dominated by Irish teams; in 24 years of the competition, Ireland has provided 15 of the champions, and 13 runners-up. The dominant team in this era has been Leinster, who have appeared in eleven out of 15 playoff finals, been both a winner and runner up in the 'round-robin' era, and have won 9 league titles in total, including 'four in a row' between 2017 and 2021. The two closest rivals to this dominance have been domestic and European rivals Munster with four titles and five runners-up spots, and Welsh flagship Ospreys with two titles in the round-robin era and two in the play-offs era. Ulster, Connacht, Scarlets (twice, once as Llanelli Scarlets, once as Scarlets), Glasgow Warriors and Stormers have also taken home the title. The 2021–22 tournament marked the first title won by a South African team: the Stormers. That year's competition also featured the first grand final not to contain a single Irish team as the losing finalists, the Bulls, were also South African.

No Italian side has yet reached an ordinary league final. The best play-off performances from the nation have been two quarter-final appearances: in 2019 and 2024 for Benetton Rugby for Italy. Benetton did however emerge as champions of the Covid-affected transitional championship, the Pro14 Rainbow Cup, which was designed to introduce the former Super Rugby sides to European rugby competition. Although not treated as a championship in the ordinary lineal line, the 2021 Rainbow Cup is considered an official URC competition, along with the defunct Celtic Cup knockout tournament. As such, every country in the competition has at least once taken home league-wide silverware.

As of 2022, four Regional Shields will also be awarded annually. The inaugural winners of the Irish, Welsh, South African and Scottish-Italian URC Shields were Leinster, Ospreys, Stormers and Edinburgh respectively.

=== By year ===
==== League ====
Below are the list of champions, runners-up and table toppers each season.

Of the 20 seasons to 2026 that included play-offs, the same team both topped the table and won the play-offs on eight occasions; Leinster on five occasions, Munster two and Glasgow Warriors once. Leinster are the only team to have achieved the feat in the URC era, in 2025. Leinster have topped the table twelve times, including once in the 'league only' era when doing so automatically the title. No Italian or South African team has ever topped the table, while three Welsh teams topped the table in the 'league only' era when doing so won the title, but never in a season with play-offs – despite which, Welsh teams have gone on to win three play-off finals.

Season	Teams	Winner	Final	Runner-up	Table Toppers
Play-offs winner crowned champion
2001–02	15	(Ireland) Leinster (1)	24–20	(Ireland) Munster (1)	(Ireland) Leinster: 21 pts
2002–03	16	(Ireland) Munster (1)	37–17	(Wales) Neath (1)	(Ireland) Munster: 28 pts
Round-robin leader crowned champion
2003–04	12	(Wales) Llanelli Scarlets (1)		(Ireland) Ulster (1)	—N/a
2004–05	11	(Wales) Ospreys (1)		(Ireland) Munster (2)	—N/a
2005–06	11	(Ireland) Ulster (1)		(Ireland) Leinster (1)	—N/a
2006–07	11	(Wales) Ospreys (2)		(Wales) Cardiff Blues (1)	—N/a
2007–08	10	(Ireland) Leinster (2)		(Wales) Cardiff Blues (2)	—N/a
2008–09	10	(Ireland) Munster (2)		(Scotland) Edinburgh (1)	—N/a
Play-offs winner crowned champion
2009–10	10	(Wales) Ospreys (3)	17–12	(Ireland) Leinster (2)	(Ireland) Leinster: 55 pts
2010–11	12	(Ireland) Munster (3)	19–9	(Ireland) Leinster (3)	(Ireland) Munster: 83 pts
2011–12	12	(Wales) Ospreys (4)	31–30	(Ireland) Leinster (4)	(Ireland) Leinster: 81 pts
2012–13	12	(Ireland) Leinster (3)	24–18	(Ireland) Ulster (2)	(Ireland) Ulster: 81 pts
2013–14	12	(Ireland) Leinster (4)	34–12	(Scotland) Glasgow (1)	(Ireland) Leinster: 82 pts
2014–15	12	(Scotland) Glasgow Warriors (1)	31–13	(Ireland) Munster (3)	(Scotland) Glasgow: 75 pts
2015–16	12	(Ireland) Connacht (1)	20–10	(Ireland) Leinster (5)	(Ireland) Leinster: 73 pts
2016–17	12	(Wales) Scarlets (2)	46–22	(Ireland) Munster (4)	(Ireland) Munster: 86 pts
2017–18	14	(Ireland) Leinster (5)	40–32	(Wales) Scarlets (1)	(Scotland) Glasgow: 76 pts
2018–19	14	(Ireland) Leinster (6)	18–15	(Scotland) Glasgow Warriors (2)	(Scotland) Glasgow: 81 pts
2019–20	14	(Ireland) Leinster (7)	27–5	(Ireland) Ulster (3)	(Ireland) Leinster: 69 pts
2020–21	12	(Ireland) Leinster (8)	16–6	(Ireland) Munster (5)	(Ireland) Leinster: 71 pts
2021–22	16	(South Africa) Stormers (1)	18–13	(South Africa) Bulls (1)	(Ireland) Leinster: 67 pts
2022–23	16	(Ireland) Munster (4)	19–14	(South Africa) Stormers (1)	(Ireland) Leinster: 79 pts
2023–24	16	(Scotland) Glasgow Warriors (2)	21–16	(South Africa) Bulls (2)	(Ireland) Munster: 68 pts
2024–25	16	(Ireland) Leinster (9)	32–7	(South Africa) Bulls (3)	(Ireland) Leinster: 76 pts
2025–26	16	(Ireland) Leinster (10)	36–7	(South Africa) Bulls (4)	(Scotland) Glasgow: 65 pts

==== Regional Shields ====
From the 2021–2022 season, a trophy will be awarded to each team that finishes top of its regional 'pool' (with Scottish and Italian teams sharing a trophy). the Irish Shield, Welsh Shield, South African Shield and Scottish-Italian Shield respectively. Prior to 2023, all matches played counted, since then only matches with other shield rivals are counted.

Season	(Ireland) Irish Shield	(Wales) Welsh Shield	(South Africa) South African Shield	(Scotland) / (Italy) Scottish-Italian Shield
2021–22	Leinster	Ospreys	Stormers	Edinburgh
2022–23	Leinster (2)	Cardiff	Stormers (2)	Glasgow
2023–24	Leinster (3)	Ospreys (2)	Bulls	Glasgow (2)
2024–25	Leinster (4)	Cardiff (2)	Sharks	Glasgow (3)
2025–26	Leinster (5)	Ospreys (3)	Lions	Glasgow (4)

==== Celtic Cup ====
The Celtic Cup was a short-lived single elimination knock-out competition, held alongside the League. It was cancelled after the Welsh teams left to join the Anglo-Welsh Cup.

Season	Teams	Winner	Final	Runner-up
2003–04	12	(Ireland) Ulster	37–21	(Scotland) Edinburgh
2004–05	8	(Ireland) Munster	27–16	(Wales) Llanelli Scarlets

==== Rainbow Cup ====
The Pro14 Rainbow Cup was a one-off 'transitional' or 'Spring Season' tournament created to facilitate the integration of the four South African sides into the United Rugby Championship. ahead of the 2021–22 season. Heavily truncated from its already short format by coronavirus regulations, for the first time, an Italian team and a South African team reached the final of an official Celtic League/Pro Rugby competition, with Benetton Treviso beating Bulls for Italy's first-ever trophy at Pro Rugby level.

Season	Teams	Winner	Final	Runner-up
2021	16	(Italy) Benetton	35–8	(South Africa) Bulls

=== By championship wins ===
Titles won by club (%)
1. Leinster: 10 (40.0%)
2. Munster: 4 (16.0%)
3. Ospreys: 4 (16.0%)
4. Glasgow: 2 (8.00%)
5. Scarlets: 2 (8.00%)
6. Ulster: 1 (4.00%)
7. Stormers: 1 (4.00%)
8. Connacht: 1 (4.00%)
Titles won by country (%)
1. Ireland: 16 (64.0%)
2. Wales: 6 (24.0%)
3. Scotland: 2 (8.00%)
4. South Africa: 1 (4.00%)

Team	Championships				Secondary titles		Regional Shields	
Team	Titles	Years	RU	Years	Cups	Years	Shields	Years
(Ireland) Leinster ᗜᗜᗜᗜᗜ	10	2001–02, 2007–08, 2012–13, 2013–14, 2017–18, 2018–19, 2019–20, 2020–21, 2024–25, 2025–26	5	2005–06, 2009–10, 2010–11, 2011–12, 2015–16			5	(Ireland) : 2021–22, 2022–23, 2023–24, 2024–25, 2025–26
(Ireland) Munster ★	4	2002–03, 2008–09, 2010–11, 2022–23	5	2001–02, 2004–05, 2014–15, 2016–17, 2020–21	1	★ 2004–05 Celtic Cup		
(Wales) Ospreys ᗜᗜᗜ	4	2004–05, 2006–07, 2009–10, 2011–12					3	(Wales) : 2021–22, 2023–24, 2025–26
(Scotland) Glasgow Warriors ᗜᗜᗜᗜ	2	2014–15, 2023–24	2	2013–14, 2018–19			4	(Scotland) / (Italy) : 2022–23, 2023–24, 2024–25, 2025–26
(Wales) Scarlets	2	2003–04, 2016–17	1	2017–18				
(Ireland) Ulster ★	1	2005–06	3	2003–04, 2012–13, 2019–20	1	★ 2003–04 Celtic Cup		
(South Africa) Stormers ᗜᗜ	1	2021–22	1	2022–23			2	(South Africa) : 2021–22, 2022–23
(Ireland) Connacht	1	2015–16						
(South Africa) Bulls ᗜ			3	2021–22, 2023–24, 2024–25			1	(South Africa) : 2023–24
(Wales) Cardiff Rugby ᗜᗜ			2	2006–07, 2007–08			2	(Wales) : 2022–23, 2024–25
(Scotland) Edinburgh ᗜ			1	2008–09			1	(Scotland) / (Italy) : 2021–22
(Wales) Neath			1	2002–03				
(Italy) Benetton					1	2021 Pro14 Rainbow Cup		
(South Africa) Sharks ᗜ							1	(South Africa) : 2024–25
(South Africa) Lions ᗜ							1	(South Africa) : 2025–26

=== By country ===
Country	Titles	Teams	Runners-up	Teams	Secondary Titles	Teams
Ireland	16	Leinster (10), Munster (4), Ulster (1), Connacht (1)	13	Leinster (5), Munster (5), Ulster (3)	2	Celtic Cup – Ulster (1), Munster (1)
Wales	6	Ospreys (4), Scarlets (2)	4	Cardiff Rugby (2), Neath (1), Scarlets (1)	—N/a	—N/a
Scotland	2	Glasgow Warriors (2)	3	Edinburgh (1), Glasgow Warriors (2)	—N/a	—N/a
South Africa	1	Stormers (1)	5	Bulls (4), Stormers (1)	—N/a	—N/a
Italy	—N/a	—N/a	—N/a	—N/a	1	Pro14 Rainbow Cup – Benetton

=== By season and team : URC era ===
In five seasons of the United Rugby Championship, fourteen of the sixteen teams have reached the play-offs at least once, the exceptions being Zebre Parma and Dragons. In contrast, Bulls, Glasgow Warriors, Leinster, Munster and Stormers have yet to miss the knock-out rounds.

Club	2021–22	2022–23	2023–24	2024–25	2025–26	2026–27
(Italy) Benetton	13	11	QF	10	13	
(South Africa) Bulls	RU	QF	RU	RU	RU	
(Wales) Cardiff Rugby	14	10	12	9	QF	
(Ireland) Connacht	11	SF	11	13	QF	
(Wales) Dragons	15	15	15	16	15	
(Scotland) Edinburgh	QF	12	10	QF	12	
(Scotland) Glasgow Warriors	QF	QF	CH	SF	SF	
(Ireland) Leinster	SF	SF	SF	CH	CH	
(South Africa) Lions	12	9	9	11	QF	
(Ireland) Munster	QF	CH	SF	QF	QF	
(Wales) Ospreys	9	13	QF	12	11	
(Wales) Scarlets	10	14	13	QF	14	
(South Africa) Sharks	QF	QF	14	SF	10	
(South Africa) Stormers	CH	RU	QF	QF	SF	
(Ireland) Ulster	SF	QF	QF	14	9	
(Italy) Zebre Parma	16	16	16	15	16	

=== 'Perfect Seasons' and League-Europe 'doubles' ===
Only one team has achieved the feat of winning every match during a season of the competition, Leinster Rugby, who have achieved the 'perfect season' twice; 2001–02 (10–0) and 2019–20 (17–0) .

Leinster are also the only team from the competition to achieve a domestic and European double, winning a 'minor double' with the 2012–13 Pro12 title and the 2012–13 European Challenge Cup, before claiming the 'full double' of the 2017–18 Pro14 and the 2017–18 European Rugby Champions Cup.

URC clubs have won the Champions Cup on seven occasions, Leinster four times, Munster twice and Ulster once. The Challenge Cup has come back to the league four times, once with Leinster, twice with Cardiff Rugby and once with Sharks.

== Player of the year ==
Player of the Year
Year	Player	Team
2009–10	(Ireland) Tommy Bowe	Ospreys
2010–11	(South Africa) Ruan Pienaar	Ulster
2011–12	(Netherlands) * Tim Visser	Edinburgh
2012–13	(New Zealand) Nick Williams	Ulster
2013–14	(Wales) Dan Biggar	Ospreys
2014–15	(Wales) Rhys Webb	Ospreys
2015–16	(New Zealand) † Bundee Aki	Connacht
2016–17	(New Zealand) Charles Piutau	Ulster
2017–18	(Ireland) Tadhg Beirne	Scarlets
2018–19	(Fiji) Viliame Mata	Edinburgh
2019–20	(South Africa) ‡ Duhan van der Merwe	Edinburgh
2020–21	(South Africa) Marcell Coetzee	Ulster
2021–22	(South Africa) Evan Roos	Stormers
2022–23	(Ireland) Dan Sheehan	Leinster
2023–24	(Ireland) Jack Crowley	Munster
2024–25	(South Africa) RG Snyman	Leinster
2025–26	(South Africa) Sacha Feinberg-Mngomezulu	Stormers
^{*} During the 2011–12, Visser had not yet qualified to represent Scotland. He became Scottish-qualified in June 2012.
†During the 2015–16 season, Aki was not yet Irish-qualified. He debuted for Ireland in 2017.
‡During the 2019–20 season, Duhan van der Merwe was not yet Scottish-qualified. He qualified to play for Scotland in the summer of 2020.

== Player statistics ==
=== Career ===
Bold indicates active player in United Rugby Championship

Most tries
Rank	Player	Clubs	Tries
1	Tommy Bowe	Ulster; Ospreys	67
2	Craig Gilroy	Ulster	59
3	**Gareth Davies**	Scarlets	58
3	Tim Visser	Edinburgh	58
3	D. T. H. van der Merwe	Glasgow Warriors; Scarlets	58
6	Steff Evans	Scarlets	52
7	Andrew Trimble	Ulster	50
8	Dan Evans	Scarlets; Dragons; Ospreys	48
8	Dave Kearney	Leinster	48
10	Tom James	Cardiff Blues; Scarlets	45
10	Johnny McNicholl	Scarlets	45
10	Simon Zebo	Munster	45

Most points
Rank	Player	Clubs	Points
1	Dan Parks	Glasgow Warriors; Connacht; Cardiff Blues	1,582
2	Dan Biggar	Ospreys	1,573
3	Ian Keatley	Connacht; Munster; Benetton; Glasgow Warriors	1,534
4	Duncan Weir	Glasgow Warriors; Edinburgh	1,032
5	**Jack Carty**	Connacht	1,020
6	Sam Davies	Ospreys; Dragons	1,003
7	Jason Tovey	Dragons; Cardiff Blues; Edinburgh	998
8	Ronan O'Gara	Munster	940
9	John Conney	Leinster; Connacht; Ulster	924
10	Rhys Priestland	Scarlets; Cardiff Blues	887

Most appearances
Rank	Player	Clubs	Apps
1	John Muldoon	Connacht	254
2	Josh Turnbull	Scarlets; Cardiff Blues	239
3	Stephen Archer	Munster	237
4	**Denis Buckley**	Connacht	227
5	Ian Keatley	Connacht; Munster; Benetton; Glasgow Warriors	215
6	Dan Evans	Scarlets; Dragons; Ospreys	210
7	Ross Ford	Border Reivers; Edinburgh	206
7	Rob Harley	Glasgow Warriors	206
9	Matthew Rees	Pontypridd; Celtic Warriors; Scarlets; Cardiff Blues	202
10	John Barclay	Scarlets; Glasgow Warriors; Edinburgh	199

Updated as of 28 February 2026
Statistics do not include those from Celtic Cup or Rainbow Cup matches.

- Most successful kicks: 397 – Dan Parks, Glasgow, Cardiff Blues and Connacht

=== Season ===
Most tries
Rank	Player	Club	Year	Tries
1	Tom Stewart	Ulster	2022–23	16
2	Tim Visser	Edinburgh	2010–11	14
2	Rabz Maxwane	Cheetahs	2019–20	14
2	Johnny Matthews	Glasgow Warriors	2023–24	14
5	Tim Visser	Edinburgh	2011–12	13
5	Steff Evans	Scarlets	2016–17	13
7	Jamie Robinson	Cardiff Blues	2003–04	12
7	Kevin Morgan	Newport Gwent Dragons	2004–05	12
7	Aled Brew	Newport Gwent Dragons	2010–11	12
7	Rhys Webb	Ospreys	2014–15	12
7	Barry Daly	Leinster	2017–18	12
7	Darcy Graham	Edinburgh	2022–23	12
7	Akker van der Merwe	Bulls	2023–24	12
7	Embrose Papier	Bulls	2025–26	12
7	Evan Roos	Stormers	2025–26	12

Most points
Rank	Player	Club	Year	Points
1	Felipe Contepomi	Leinster	2005–06	287
2	Neil Jenkins	Celtic Warriors	2003–04	273
3	Gavin Henson	Neath-Swansea Ospreys	2003–04	265
4	Dan Biggar	Ospreys	2011–12	257
5	Dan Biggar	Ospreys	2010–11	248
6	Gareth Bowen	Llanelli Scarlets	2003–04	240
7	David Humphreys	Ulster	2005–06	229
8	Ian Keatley	Munster	2010–11	224
9	Dan Biggar	Ospreys	2013–14	219
10	Manie Libbok	Stormers	2022–23	217

Updated as 21 June 2026

- Most successful kicks: 99 – Neil Jenkins, Celtic Warriors, 2003–04
- Most appearances: 24 – Rob Harley, Glasgow, 2013–14; Finlay Bealham, Connacht, 2015–16; Hadleigh Parkes, Scarlets, 2016–17

== Attendance ==
Season	Total	Average	Highest
2001–02	252,213	4,504	30,000 (Leinster v Munster, Final, 15 December 2001) (Note: Figures for 2001–02 are incomplete.)
2002–03	308,374	4,895	30,076 (Munster v Neath, Final, 1 February 2003) (Note: Figures for 2002–03 are incomplete.)
2003–04	501,875	3,802	12,000 (Ulster v Leinster, Round 21, 7 May 2004) (Note: The 2003–04 season was the first that did not include a knockout stage so no showpiece final and hence a decline in average attendance.)
2004–05	470,446	4,277	10,500 (Dragons v Cardiff Blues, Round 13, 27 December 2004)
2005–06	571,331	5,194	15,327 (Cardiff Blues v Leinster, Round 16, 14 May 2006)
2006–07	661,163	6,011	48,000 (Leinster v Ulster, Round 12, 31 December 2006) (Note: This was the final rugby match at Lansdowne Road before it was redeveloped as the Aviva Stadium.)
2007–08	609,015	6,767	18,500 (Leinster v Munster, Round 15, 12 April 2008)
2008–09	731,328	8,126	26,043 (Munster v Leinster, Connacht and Ospreys in Rounds 15, 16 and 18)
2009–10	818,181	8,798	25,623 (Munster v Leinster, Round 15, 2 April 2010)
2010–11	1,019,634	7,553	50,645 (Leinster v Munster, Round 5, 2 October 2010) (Note: The first senior match to take place at the Aviva Stadium.) (Note: The decline in average attendance following the 2009–10 season coincided with the entry of two Italian teams into the Pro12.)
2011–12	1,042,374	7,721	48,365 (Leinster v Munster, Round 8, 4 November 2011)
2012–13	1,106,873	8,199	46,280 (Leinster v Munster, Round 6, 6 October 2012)
2013–14	1,107,707	8,205	51,700 (Leinster v Munster, Round 18, 29 March 2014)
2014–15	1,159,127	8,586	52,762 (Cardiff Blues v Ospreys / Dragons v Scarlets, Round 20, 25 April 2015) (Note: These matches comprised the annual Judgement Day double-header at the Millennium Stadium.)
2015–16	1,144,802	8,480	68,262 (Cardiff Blues v Ospreys / Dragons v Scarlets, Round 21, 30 April 2016)
2016–17	1,184,091	8,771	60,642 (Cardiff Blues v Ospreys / Dragons v Scarlets, Round 20, 15 April 2017)
2017–18	1,301,321	8,561	62,338 (Cardiff Blues v Ospreys / Dragons v Scarlets, Round 21, 28 April 2018)
2018–19	1,252,435	8,240	51,297 (Dragons v Scarlets / Cardiff Blues v Ospreys, Round 21, 27 April 2019)
2019–20	652,443	7,331	27,437 (Edinburgh v Glasgow, Round 9, 28 December 2019) (Note: The season was suspended in March 2020 due to the COVID-19 pandemic. The league restarted in August 2020 in a truncated format, without fans in attendance. The only exception to this was Edinburgh vs Glasgow on 28 August 2020 which allowed 700 fans to attend.)
2020–21	0	0	N/A (Note: The season was played behind closed doors due to the COVID-19 pandemic.)
2021–22	—N/a	—N/a	32,411 (Leinster v Munster (Round 18, 21 May 2022)
2022–23	1,632,114	10,809	56,344 (Stormers v Munster, Grand Final, 27 May 2023)
2023–24	1,690,000	11,200	50,388 (Bulls v Glasgow Warriors, Grand Final, 22 June 2024)
2024–25	1,832,138	12,133	80,468 (Leinster v Munster, Round 4, 12 October 2024) (Note: Record match attendance in league history.)
2025–26	1,692,734	11,210	53,862 (Stormers v Bulls, Round 9, 3 January 2026)

== List of final venues ==
From 2002 to 2003 and from 2010 to 2014, the higher ranked team in the final were the hosting team. Between 2003 and 2010, no play-off was held and final standings determined the champion. However, from the 2014–15 Pro12 season onward, a pre-determined stadium was chosen at the start of the season that would host the final. In 2021–22, the inaugural United Rugby Championship season, the competition reverted to the highest seeded team hosting the final.

With five finals, RDS Arena, the home stadium of Leinster Rugby, has hosted the final most often, followed by the Aviva Stadium/Lansdowne Road in the same city with four (three as the Aviva, once as Lansdowne in the inaugural season). As of 2025, Ireland have hosted twelve of the eighteen finals in all, across five stadia. Cape Town Stadium is the only other stadium to hold multiple finals, with back to back showpieces hosted by the Stormers in 2021-22 and 2022-23. South Africa have hosted three finals in total, all since 2021. Two finals have been held in Scotland, including in the home of Old Firm football giant, Celtic F.C., Celtic Park in 2019, the only occasion the final to date has been held in a venue not predominantly associated with rugby union. Wales has hosted the final once.

Of the five participating nations, only Italy have not yet hosted a linear final, although Benetton Rugby did host the transitional Pro14 Rainbow Cup final in their stadium, Stadio Comunale di Monigo.

The 2023 United Rugby Championship Grand Final between Stormers and Munster is the highest attended final (though not the highest attended match) in the competition's history, with 56,334 fans in the Cape Town Stadium. Two finals have been played in empty stadia due to the covid pandemic, in 2020 and 2021; otherwise, the lowest final attendance was the 2015 Pro12 Grand Final at Ravenhill, with 17,057 fans.

Season	Stadium	Attendance	City
2001–02	Lansdowne Road	30,000	(Ireland) Dublin
2002–03	Millennium Stadium	30,076	(Wales) Cardiff
2003–2009: no playoffs
2009–10	RDS Arena	19,500	(Ireland) Dublin
2010–11	Thomond Park	26,100	(Ireland) Limerick
2011–12	RDS Arena	18,500	(Ireland) Dublin
2012–13	RDS Arena	19,200	(Ireland) Dublin
2013–14	RDS Arena	19,200	(Ireland) Dublin
2014–15	Ravenhill Stadium	17,057	(Ireland) Belfast
2015–16	Murrayfield Stadium	34,550	(Scotland) Edinburgh
2016–17	Aviva Stadium	44,558	(Ireland) Dublin
2017–18	Aviva Stadium	46,092	(Ireland) Dublin
2018–19	Celtic Park	47,125	(Scotland) Glasgow
2019–20	Aviva Stadium	0 (Note: This final was played behind closed doors due to COVID-19 pandemic restrictions.)	(Ireland) Dublin
2020–21	RDS Arena	0	(Ireland) Dublin
2021–22	Cape Town Stadium	31,000	(South Africa) Cape Town
2022–23	Cape Town Stadium	56,334	(South Africa) Cape Town
2023–24	Loftus Versfeld Stadium	50,388	(South Africa) Pretoria
2024–25	Croke Park	46,127	(Ireland) Dublin
2025–26	Croke Park	39,184	(Ireland) Dublin

== See also ==
- 1872 Cup – Scottish derby
- Celtic Cup (2003), a short-lived knockout tournament for Celtic League teams
- Celtic Cup (2018), a tournament of the same name for Pro14 development teams from Ireland and Wales
- Anglo-Welsh Cup
- British and Irish Cup
- European Challenge Cup
- European Professional Club Rugby
- European Rugby Challenge Cup
- European Rugby Champions Cup
- Heineken Cup
- Judgement Day – Welsh derbies
- Sports league attendances
- Welsh Premier Division
- Major League Rugby
- Súper Liga Americana de Rugby
- List of professional sports teams in the United Kingdom
