= 2026 United Rugby Championship Grand Final =

Rugby union match

- Event: 2025–26 United Rugby Championship
Leinster	Bulls
(Ireland)	(South Africa)
36	7
- Date: 19 June 2026
- Venue: Croke Park, Dublin
- Man of the Match: Sam Prendergast (Leinster)
- Referee: Andrea Piardi (Italy)
- Attendance: 39,184
- Weather: Wet

The 2026 United Rugby Championship Grand Final was the final match of the 2025–26 United Rugby Championship (URC) season. It was contested at Croke Park, Dublin, by Ireland's Leinster, with home-field advantage, and the visiting Bulls from South Africa on 19 June 2026, making it the first Grand Final to be played on a Friday night. It was the fourth successive cross-continental final in the competition, and an exact repeat of the 2025 Grand Final.

The final was held in Ireland for the second time since the reconfiguration of the United Rugby Championship in 2021. It was the Bulls' fourth appearance following defeats in 2022, 2024 and 2025, and Leinster's second since the competition adopted its current format, but a record 13th final appearance in total (having won in 2002, 2013, 2014, 2018, 2019, 2020, 2021 and 2025, and lost in 2010, 2011, 2012 and 2016). Bulls had previously appeared in, and won, three finals (2007, 2009 and 2010) in the Super Rugby competition, and lost in the final of the transitional season Pro14 Rainbow Cup. Bulls had also won one Super Rugby Unlocked title, again without playing a final.

Leinster were attempting to win a record-extending tenth overall title in all formats of the competition, and to become the first back-to-back and multiple winners in the URC era; the Bulls were attempting to win their first title in this competition in their record fourth URC era final, to go with their three Super Rugby titles, and one Super Rugby Unlocked title they won prior to 2021.

Leinster won for a second successive year, beating the Bulls 36–7. It confirmed a record 10th domestic league win for the Irish province, and a fourth URC Grand Final defeat for the South Africans.

== Route to the Grand Final ==
For the second straight year, the United Rugby Championship culminates in a Grand Final at Dublin's Croke Park between Leinster and the Bulls, the first time a final pairing has been repeated since the URC era began in 2021. Unlike the previous year, however, this does not represent the meeting of the first and second seeded teams, as Bulls defeated the top seed, Glasgow Warriors, at Murrayfield Stadium in the semi-final, the first away win in the play-offs since Glasgow beat the Bulls at Loftus Versfeld Stadium, Pretoria in the 2024 United Rugby Championship Grand Final. For the fourth time in five seasons, the top-seeded team from the regular season failed to reach the Grand Final.

Second-seeded Leinster thus host their second final in a sixth successive home play-off tie, having won the previous five. This will also be Leinster's third successive home play-off tie against South African opposition in this year's competition, having defeated Lions in the quarter-final and Stormers in the semi-final. Meanwhile, Bulls dispatched Irish side Munster in a home quarter-final before the away win over Glasgow in the semi-final.

(Ireland) Leinster		vs	(South Africa) Bulls	
League season – top eight
Pos / Team / Pld / W / D / L / PF / PA / PD / TF / TA / TB / LB / Pts; 1 / Glasgow Warriors / 18 / 13 / 0 / 5 / 479 / 338 / +141 / 72 / 48 / 11 / 2 / 65; 2 / Leinster / 18 / 12 / 0 / 6 / 515 / 370 / +145 / 77 / 51 / 13 / 2 / 63; 3 / Stormers / 18 / 12 / 1 / 5 / 504 / 344 / +160 / 63 / 48 / 9 / 1 / 60; 4 / Bulls / 18 / 12 / 0 / 6 / 576 / 406 / +170 / 82 / 59 / 10 / 1 / 59; 5 / Munster / 18 / 11 / 0 / 7 / 396 / 376 / +20 / 59 / 51 / 8 / 3 / 55; 6 / Cardiff / 18 / 11 / 0 / 7 / 353 / 372 / −19 / 52 / 52 / 7 / 4 / 55; 7 / Lions / 18 / 10 / 1 / 7 / 532 / 473 / +59 / 73 / 70 / 9 / 3 / 54; 8 / Connacht / 18 / 10 / 0 / 8 / 442 / 395 / +47 / 62 / 56 / 10 / 4 / 54; Source: UnitedRugby.com
Play-offs
Opponent	Result	Play-offs	Opponent	Result
(South Africa) Lions (H)	59–10	Quarter-finals	(Ireland) Munster (H)	45–14
(South Africa) Stormers (H)	20–11	Semi-finals	(Scotland) Glasgow Warriors (A)	22–21

== Background ==
Leinster and Bulls have met eight times in the United Rugby Championship since Bulls joined the competition in 2021. Bulls lead the rivalry five games to three. Bulls had won both previous play-off matches between the sides, the semi-finals in 2022 and 2024, before Leinster triumphed in the 2025 Grand Final; the 2026 Grand final will be the two sides fourth play-off meeting in five seasons.

Bulls also won the solitary regular season match between the teams in the 2025–26 season by eight points. Bulls' semi-final victory in June 2022 at the RDS Arena remains, to date, the only away victory achieved in the fixture.

Leinster have appeared in twelve previous finals of the competition in its various incarnations, winning eight of them (in addition to one title won in the round-robin era where no final was held). Bulls have reached four finals in five seasons of the United Rugby Championship; they have failed to win any of the previous three finals. The South Africans also reached the final of the transitional URC/Pro14 Rainbow Cup in 2021, again falling to Benetton. Prior to their arrival in the URC, the Bulls reached three finals in the SANZAAR Super Rugby competition, winning the title on all three occasions (in addition to the round robin 2020 Super Rugby Unlocked competition, for South African and Argentinian teams, which did not feature a final match).

== Match ==
=== Venue ===
With the Bulls having beaten top-seeded Glasgow Warriors to reach the final, second-seeded Leinster go into the match as the highest remaining seeds, giving them home advantage. Due to stadium availability in the Leinster area, Dublin's Croke Park was selected for a Friday night fixture, making this the first United Rugby Championship grand final to be played on a Friday night. Leinster played one URC match at Croke Park in 2025–26, losing 31–14 to rivals Munster. Although this will be eleventh final played in a Dublin stadium in the entire history of the competition, it is only the second to be played at Croke Park, following the 2025 final.

=== Officials ===
Italian referee Andrea Piardi was named as the lead official for the match, taking charge of a fourth consecutive URC Grand Final. He is joined by a pair of Welsh assistant referees in Adam Jones and Ben Breakspear, and fellow Italian Matteo Liperini as television match official (TMO).

=== Team selection ===
Both teams announced their matchday squads on 17 June, two days in advance of the match. The Bulls' side was unchanged from their semi-final victory over Glasgow Warriors and included 11 South Africa internationals in the starting XV, while Leinster made three changes to their starting line-up: winger Jimmy O'Brien missed out on the matchday 23 entirely, replaced by his namesake Tommy O'Brien, who was returning to fitness after missing Leinster's last four United Rugby Championship games; loosehead prop Andrew Porter was ruled out of the final after suffering an injury in the first half of Leinster's semi-final against the Stormers, and was replaced by Jerry Cahir, who will be making his final Leinster appearance, while tighthead Tadhg Furlong returned to the starting line-up for the first time since April in place of Tom Clarkson. Number 8 Caelan Doris was named as captain despite being an injury doubt, but hooker Dan Sheehan's own injury meant he only managed a place on the bench. As well as Cahir, who agreed a move to Connacht for the 2026–27 season in May, wing James Lowe, centre Rieko Ioane and scrum-half Luke McGrath will be leaving Leinster after the final to Tokyo Sungoliath, Blues and Perpignan, respectively. Connacht-bound utility back Ciarán Frawley was a notable absentee from the final 23, despite a call-up by Andy Farrell for Ireland's opening fixtures in the 2026 Nations Championship.

=== Summary ===
The match started with an early yellow card for the Bulls' Canan Moodie for an intentional knock-on in the second minute. A man up, Leinster took the lead four minutes later, as Tommy O'Brien pounced on a misplaced pass by Bulls hooker Johan Grobbelaar about 20 yards into the Leinster half to hack through and score under the posts, Sam Prendergast adding the conversion. Leinster scored a second try 10 minutes later; Jamison Gibson-Park took a long, quick throw-in to Prendergast, who played an inside pass to full-back Hugo Keenan, who then slipped a tackle and fed Rieko Ioane to score in the corner. The conversion was missed, giving Leinster a 12–0 lead inside the first quarter. In the 26th minute, the Bulls suffered another sin-binning, as Willie le Roux was carded for the same offence as Moodie, intentionally knocking the ball down to prevent a Leinster line-break. The man advantage immediately paid dividends for Leinster, as Jack Conan scored their third try from short range; this time Prendergast was successful with the conversion, and he added a penalty in the 32nd minute to give Leinster a 22–0 half-time lead.

After the break, Prendergast himself scored Leinster's fourth try, diving over from the base of a ruck while referee Andrea Piardi was playing a penalty advantage, and adding his own conversion for 29–0. The Bulls thought they had scored shortly after, as Harold Vorster appeared to have grounded the ball, but Piardi ruled it out after a TMO review. As the game approached its final quarter, Leinster committed their own intentional knock-on, James Lowe going to the bin on his final appearance for the province. The Bulls took four minutes to make the extra man count, as Moodie made up for his earlier yellow card by barrelling over after being fed from the back of a maul; Handré Pollard added the extras to reduce the deficit to 29–7. Harry Byrne came on for Prendergast with just over 10 minutes to go and made an impact as the game drew to an end, forcing his way over from short range to score under the posts and then adding the conversion to give Leinster a 36–7 win and a second straight title.

=== Details ===
19 June 2026
19:30 BST/IST
20:30 SAST

Leinster (Ireland) (2)	36–7	(4) (South Africa) Bulls
Try: T. O'Brien 6' c Ioane 16' m Conan 27' c Prendergast 46' c Byrne 76' c Con: Prendergast (3/4) 6', 27', 46'; Byrne 77'; Pen: Prendergast 32'	Report; Scoreboard; Highlights	Try: Moodie 62' c Con: Pollard 63'

Croke Park, Dublin
Attendance: 39,184
Referee: Andrea Piardi (Italy)

FB	15	(Ireland) Hugo Keenan
RW	14	(Ireland) Tommy O'Brien		(substituted off) 40'
OC	13	(New Zealand) Rieko Ioane
IC	12	(Ireland) Jamie Osborne
LW	11	(Ireland) James Lowe	(yellow card) 58'
FH	10	(Ireland) Sam Prendergast		(substituted off) 68'
SH	9	(Ireland) Jamison Gibson-Park		(substituted off) 72'
N8	8	(Ireland) Caelan Doris (c)		(substituted off) 6'
OF	7	(Ireland) Josh van der Flier
BF	6	(Ireland) Max Deegan
RL	5	(Ireland) James Ryan
LL	4	(Ireland) Joe McCarthy		(substituted off) 69'
TP	3	(Ireland) Tadhg Furlong		(substituted off) 47'
HK	2	(Ireland) Rónan Kelleher		(substituted off) 47'
LP	1	(Ireland) Jerry Cahir		(substituted off) 47'
Substitutes:
HK	16	(Ireland) Dan Sheehan		(substituted on) 47'
PR	17	(Ireland) Alex Usanov		(substituted on) 47'
PR	18	(Ireland) Tom Clarkson		(substituted on) 47'
FL	19	(Ireland) Diarmuid Mangan		(substituted on) 69'
N8	20	(Ireland) Jack Conan		(substituted on) 6'
SH	21	(Ireland) Luke McGrath		(substituted on) 72'
FH	22	(Ireland) Harry Byrne		(substituted on) 68'
CE	23	(Ireland) Garry Ringrose		(substituted on) 40'
Coach:
(Ireland) Leo Cullen

FB	15	(South Africa) Willie le Roux	(yellow card) 25'
RW	14	(South Africa) Kurt-Lee Arendse
OC	13	(South Africa) Canan Moodie	(yellow card) 2'
IC	12	(South Africa) Harold Vorster
LW	11	(South Africa) Stravino Jacobs		(substituted off) 59'
FH	10	(South Africa) Handré Pollard
SH	9	(South Africa) Embrose Papier		(substituted off) 70'
N8	8	(South Africa) Cameron Hanekom		(substituted off) 54'
BF	7	(South Africa) Elrigh Louw		(substituted off) 54'
OF	6	(South Africa) Marcell Coetzee (c)
RL	5	(South Africa) Ruan Nortjé
LL	4	(South Africa) Ruan Vermaak		(substituted off) 56'
TP	3	(South Africa) Francois Klopper		(substituted off) 54'
HK	2	(South Africa) Johan Grobbelaar		(substituted off) 73'
LP	1	(South Africa) Gerhard Steenekamp		(substituted off) 54'
Substitutes:
HK	16	(South Africa) Marco van Staden		(substituted on) 54'
PR	17	(South Africa) Jan-Hendrik Wessels		(substituted on) 54'
PR	18	(South Africa) Wilco Louw		(substituted on) 54'
LK	19	(South Africa) Cobus Wiese		(substituted on) 56'
N8	20	(South Africa) Jeandré Rudolph		(substituted on) 54'
SH	21	(South Africa) Zak Burger		(substituted on) 70'
CE	22	(South Africa) Stedman Gans		(substituted on) 59'
N8	23	(South Africa) Nizaam Carr		(substituted on) 73'
Coach:
(South Africa) Johan Ackermann

Man of the Match:
Sam Prendergast (Leinster)

Assistant referees:
Adam Jones (Wales)
Ben Breakspear (Wales)
Television match official:
Matteo Liperini (Italy)

== Broadcasting ==
The match was shown live by SuperSport in South Africa, and by Premier Sports in the United Kingdom and Ireland. FloRugby and URC.tv carried coverage elsewhere.
