= CJ van der Linde =

South Africa international rugby union player

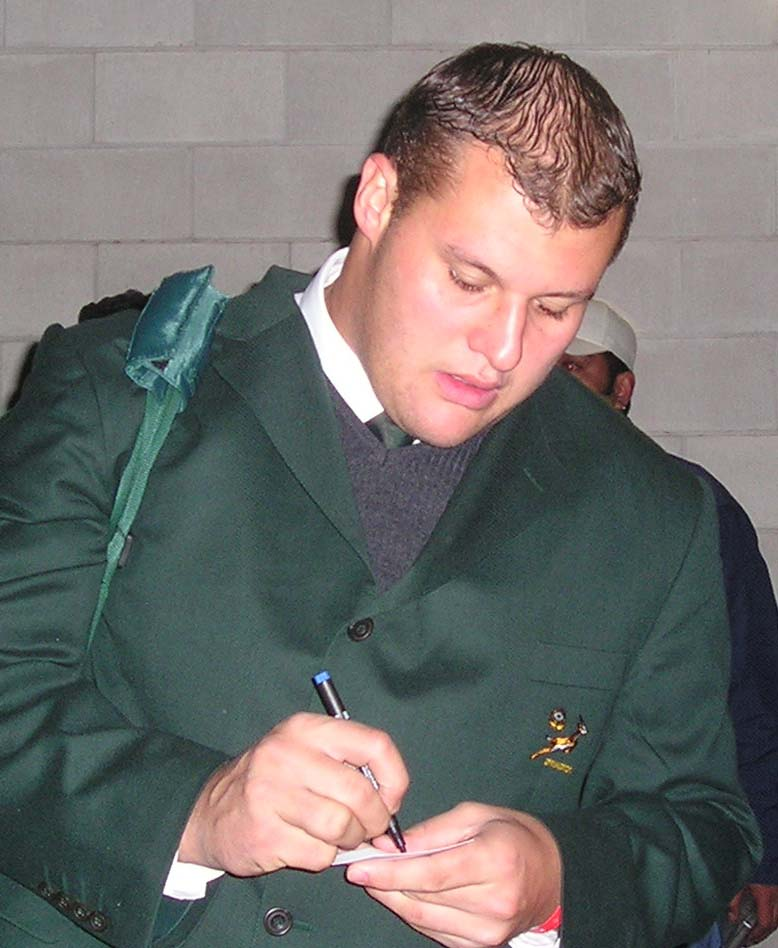
- Full name: Christoffel Johannes van der Linde
- Born: 27 August 1980 (age 46) Welkom, South Africa
- Height: 1.90 m (6 ft 3 in)
- Weight: 130 kg (20 st 7 lb; 287 lb)
- School: Grey College, Bloemfontein
- University: University of the Free State

Rugby union career
- Position: Prop
Youth career
- 2000: Free State Cheetahs
Senior career
Years	Team	Apps	(Points)
2002–2008	Free State Cheetahs	45	(30)
2004–2005	Cats	19	(5)
2006–2008	Cheetahs	19	(10)
2008–2010	Leinster	26	(0)
2010	Free State Cheetahs	4	(0)
2011	Stormers	11	(0)
2011–2013	Golden Lions	18	(0)
2012–2013	Lions	7	(0)
2014	London Irish	1	(0)
2014–2015	Eastern Province Kings	10	(0)
2015	Montpellier	4	(0)
2002–2015	Total	164	(45)
- Correct as of 8 May 2015
International career
Years	Team	Apps	(Points)
1998	S.A. Schools		
1999	South Africa Under-19		
2000–2001	South Africa Under-21		
2002–2012	South Africa	75	(20)
- Correct as of 14 May 2014
Coaching career
- Years: Team
- 2015–present: Montpellier (scrum coach)
Medal record
Men's Rugby union
Representing South Africa
Rugby World Cup
Gold medal – first place	2007 France	Squad

Christoffel Johannes van der Linde (born 27 August 1980) is a South African former professional rugby union player and currently the scrum coach at French Top 14 side Montpellier. He played first class rugby between 2002 and 2015 in South Africa, Ireland, England and France and also made 75 test matches for South Africa, which included winning the 2007 Rugby World Cup. His usual playing position was prop.

== Career ==
=== Youth ===
Van der Linde represented the Free State Cheetahs at the Under-18 Craven Week tournament in 1998, earning him a call-up to the South African Schools side in the same year. As he progressed through the youth ranks at the Cheetahs, he continued playing for national youth sides, representing the Under-19s in 1999 and the Under-21s in 2000 and 2001.

=== Free State Cheetahs ===
Van der Linde was involved in the senior setup at the Cheetahs from 2001, when he was named in their squad for the 2001 Currie Cup competition. His domestic first class debut came in 2002, when he played for the Free State Cheetahs in the 2002 Vodacom Cup competition. He remained with the Free State Cheetahs until 2008, making 45 domestic appearances in the Vodacom Cup and Currie Cup competitions during his spell there.

Van der Linde was a member of the Free State Cheetahs side that won the 2005 Currie Cup, also coming on as a substitute in the final, which the Cheetahs won 29–25 against the Blue Bulls at Loftus Versfeld.

Van der Linde also played in five Super Rugby seasons during his spell at the Cheetahs. In 2004 and 2005, the Free State Cheetahs were part of the Cats franchise in the Super 12 competition. Van der Linde played for them during both seasons, making 19 appearances. When the Super 12 expanded to become Super 14, the Cheetahs were one of the two new teams and Van der Linde played for them over the next three seasons, making another 19 appearances.

=== Leinster ===
Van der Linde signed a three-year contract with Leinster in late 2008. He represented them in the Celtic League and Heineken Cup competitions between 2008 and 2010, but his spell at Leinster was blighted by a recurrent foot problem. He got an early release from his contract, leaving the side in 2010.

Van der Linde did play for Leinster in the 2010 Celtic League Grand Final, a match they lost 17–12 to the Ospreys.

=== Return to Free State Cheetahs ===
Van der Linde returned to his former side the Free State Cheetahs following his release from Leinster and made four appearances for them during the 2010 Currie Cup Premier Division competition.

=== Stormers ===
Van der Linde joined the Cape Town-based Stormers for 2011, making 11 appearances for them during the 2011 Super Rugby season.

=== Lions ===
Van der Linde left the Stormers after the 2011 Super Rugby season to join the Golden Lions. He made his Lions debut in the 2011 Currie Cup Premier Division semi-final match against Western Province and also started the final, when the Lions beat the Sharks 42–16 to win the Currie Cup for the first time in 12 years. He also played for the Lions during the 2012 and 2013 seasons, as well as making seven appearances for the Lions in the 2013 Super Rugby season. He left the Lions after his contract expired at the end of 2013.

=== London Irish ===
On 12 December 2013, it was announced that he had signed with London Irish until the end of the 2013–14 season in the Aviva Premiership. However, Van der Linde only made a single appearance for London Irish, playing 20 minutes.

=== Eastern Province Kings ===
In May 2014, Van der Linde trained with the Eastern Province Kings in an attempt to get a contract for their 2014 Currie Cup Premier Division campaign. The Eastern Province Rugby Union later confirmed that he got a contract till the end of 2014. He made ten appearances for the Eastern Province Kings and was named their scrum coach prior to the 2015 Currie Cup Premier Division.

=== Montpellier ===
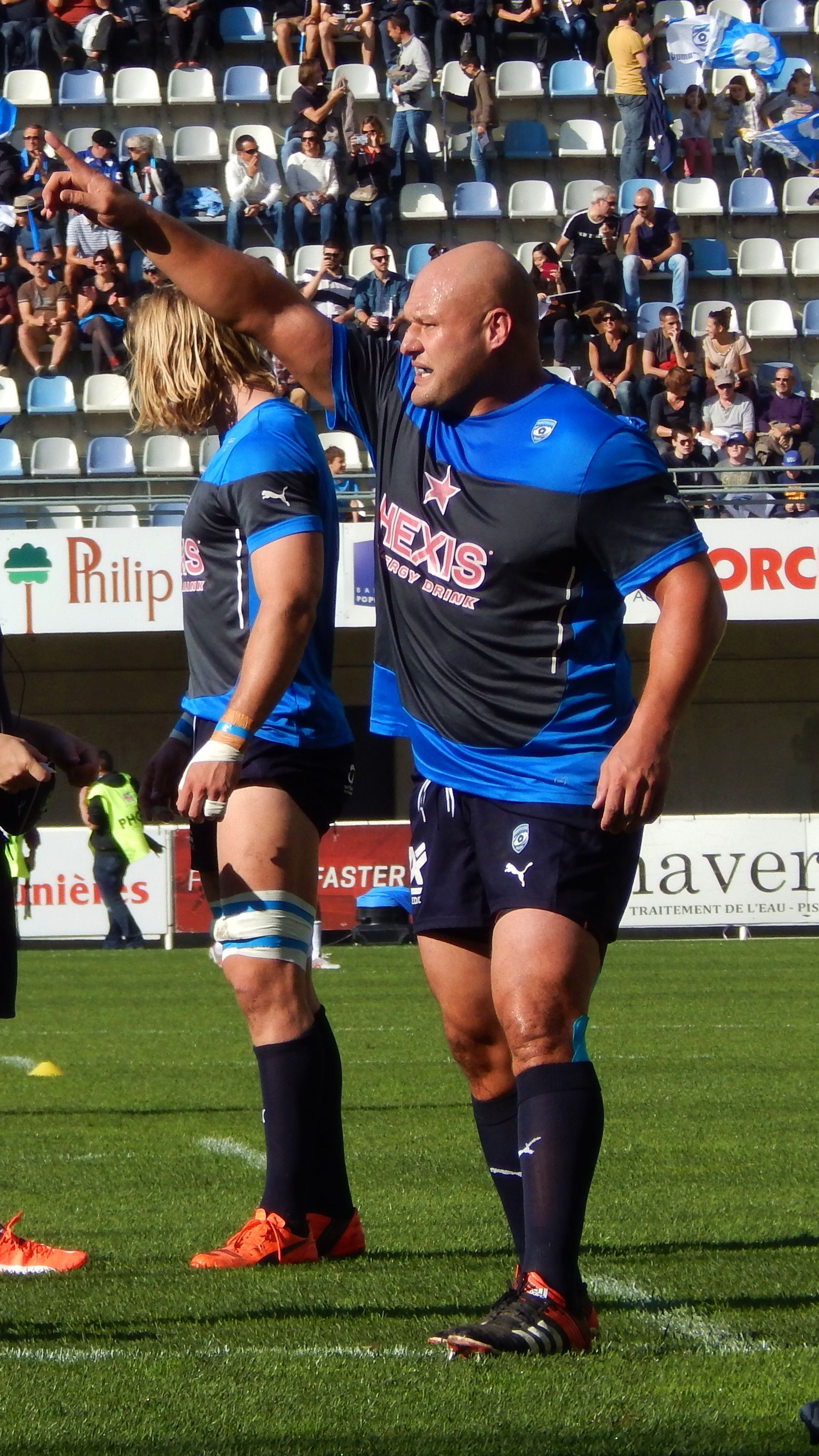
CJ van der Linde (Montpellier, 2015)

Van der Linde joined Montpellier prior to the 2015–16 Top 14 season on a two-year contract. He made just four appearances for Montpellier before tearing a bicep, which resulted in his decision to retire from playing rugby. However, he stayed on at Montpellier, where he joined the coaching staff by becoming the scrum coach.

=== International rugby ===
Van der Linde made his debut for the Springboks as a 20-year-old on 16 November 2002 in a match against Scotland at Murrayfield, which South Africa lost 21–6. He earned another cap for South Africa that year, playing England at Twickenham.

Van der Linde next played for the Springboks in 2004, against Ireland in a two test series in South Africa, and also played against the Pacific Islands team in Gosford. He was subsequently named in the Springboks' 2004 Tri Nations Series squad, and played in three matches during the series. He earned another five caps for South Africa during the end-of-year Northern Hemisphere tests.

Van der Linde played 17 times for the Springboks in 2005 including mid-year matches against France and in the 2005 Tri Nations Series. After playing for the Springboks in the 2006 mid-year rugby tests he was named in the 2006 Tri Nations Series squad. On 26 November 2006, he scored his first try in international play against England at Twickenham.

Van der Linde was part of the South African team which won the 2007 Rugby World Cup.
