= 2025 United Rugby Championship Grand Final =

Rugby union match

- Event: 2024–25 United Rugby Championship
Leinster	Bulls
(Ireland)	(South Africa)
32	7
- Date: 14 June 2025
- Venue: Croke Park, Dublin
- Man of the Match: Ryan Baird (Leinster)
- Referee: Andrea Piardi (Italy)
- Attendance: 46,127

The 2025 United Rugby Championship Grand Final was the final match of the 2024–25 United Rugby Championship (URC) season. It was contested at Croke Park, Dublin by Ireland's Leinster, with home field advantage, and the visiting Bulls from Pretoria, South Africa. It was the third successive cross-continental final in the competition.

The final was held in Ireland for the first time since 2021 and the reconfiguration of the United Rugby Championship, with a third appearance for the Bulls following their defeats in 2022 and 2024, and a first appearance for Leinster since the competition adopted its current format, but a record 11th final appearance in total (winning in 2002, 2013, 2014, 2018, 2019, 2020 and 2021, and losing in 2010, 2011, 2012 and 2016). Bulls have previously appeared in, and won, three finals (2007, 2009 and 2010) in the Super Rugby competition, and lost in the final of the transitional season Pro14 Rainbow Cup.

For the first time in this format, the top-seeded team at the start of the play-offs has reached the final. Neither side has yet won the United Rugby Championship in its current format, but Leinster attempted to win a record-extending ninth overall title in all formats of the competition; the Bulls attempted to win their first title in this competition in their third final, to go with their three Super Rugby titles, and one Super Rugby Unlocked title won prior to 2021.

== Route to the Grand Final ==
(Ireland) Leinster		vs	(South Africa) Bulls	
League season – top eight
Pos / Team / Pld / W / D / L / PF / PA / PD / TF / TA / TB / LB / Pts; 1 / Leinster / 18 / 16 / 0 / 2 / 542 / 256 / +286 / 79 / 35 / 11 / 1 / 76; 2 / Bulls / 18 / 14 / 0 / 4 / 542 / 361 / +181 / 71 / 44 / 9 / 3 / 68; 3 / Sharks / 18 / 13 / 0 / 5 / 436 / 402 / +34 / 55 / 59 / 7 / 3 / 62; 4 / Glasgow Warriors / 18 / 11 / 0 / 7 / 468 / 327 / +141 / 70 / 40 / 10 / 5 / 59; 5 / Stormers / 18 / 10 / 0 / 8 / 507 / 418 / +89 / 66 / 57 / 11 / 4 / 55; 6 / Munster / 18 / 9 / 0 / 9 / 444 / 429 / +15 / 67 / 59 / 11 / 4 / 51; 7 / Edinburgh / 18 / 8 / 1 / 9 / 471 / 407 / +64 / 66 / 57 / 9 / 6 / 49; 8 / Scarlets / 18 / 9 / 1 / 8 / 427 / 382 / +45 / 50 / 52 / 6 / 4 / 48; Source: UnitedRugby.com
Play-offs
Opponent	Result	Play-offs	Opponent	Result
(Wales) Scarlets (H)	33–21	Quarter-finals	(Scotland) Edinburgh (H)	42–33
(Scotland) Glasgow Warriors (H)	37–19	Semi-finals	(South Africa) Sharks (H)	25–13

== Previous meetings ==
Leinster and Bulls had met six times in the United Rugby Championship since the Bulls joined the league in 2021. Bulls led the rivalry 4–2, including winning both previous play-off matches between the sides: the semi-finals in 2022 and 2024. Bulls also won the regular season match between the teams in 2024–25 by a single point, 21–20.

== Match ==
=== Venue ===
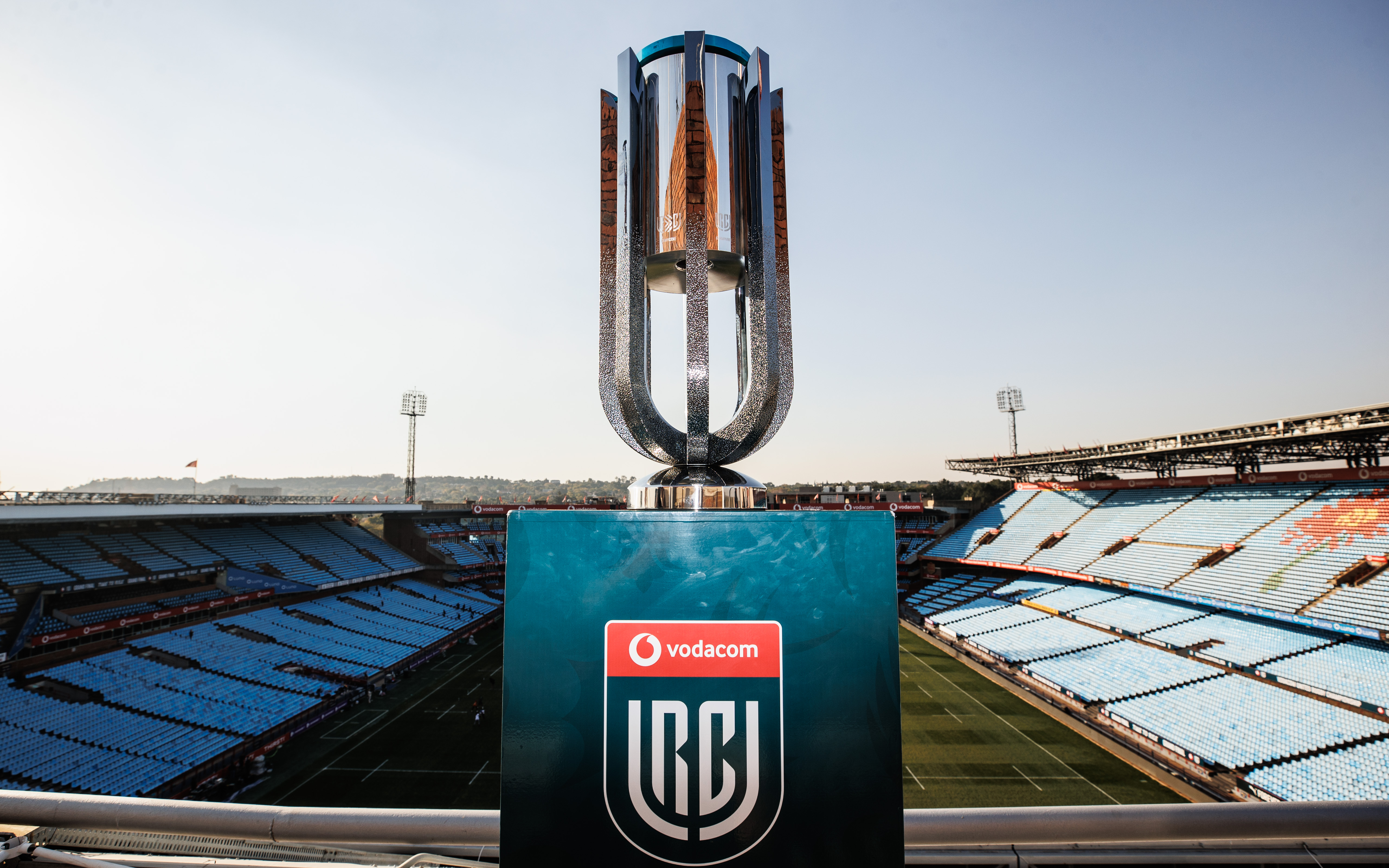
The URC trophy on display at Loftus Versfeld Stadium before the 2024 Grand Final

With Leinster reaching the final from the first seeding, they maintained home advantage throughout the playoffs and elected to play the final in Croke Park, Dublin, having already played one URC fixture (against Munster) and one European Champions Cup fixture there this season. Although this will be tenth final played in a Dublin stadium in the entire history of the competition, it was the first to be played at Croke Park.

Leinster have a perfect competitive record at the ground, winning four times in four visits. This will be the first visit of a South African club side to the venue; the Springboks lost to Ireland in the only previous rugby union match involving both nations at the stadium.

=== Team selection ===
Both teams were announced on the morning of 12 June 2025. Both teams opted for a 5–3 split on the bench (five forwards, three backs as replacements). Jake White made one change to the Bulls team to face Leinster, with Marco van Staden replacing the injured Cameron Hanekom. Josh van der Flier and Garry Ringrose return for Leinster, but Hugo Keenan and Tadgh Furlong fail to recover from previous injuries, while Leinster club captain Caelan Doris is a long-term injury absentee. Jack Conan deputised as captain. The final will also be All Black Jordie Barrett's final game for Leinster before returning to New Zealand.

On the morning of the final, Leinster's first choice scrum-half Jamison Gibson-Park was ruled out by late injury. Luke McGrath came into the starting XV, with Fintan Gunne coming onto the bench.

=== Details ===
14 June 2025

Leinster (Ireland)	32–7	(South Africa) Bulls
Try: Conan 6'; Barrett 14'; Van der Flier 23'; Gunne 73'; Con: Prendergast 7', 14'; Ross Byrne 74'; Pen: Prendergast 45', 68'		Try: Van der Merwe 51'; Con: Goosen 51'

Croke Park, Dublin
Attendance: 46,127
Referee: Andrea Piardi (Italy)

FB	15	(Ireland) Jimmy O’Brien
RW	14	(Ireland) Tommy O’Brien
OC	13	(Ireland) Garry Ringrose	(substituted off) 75'
IC	12	(New Zealand) Jordie Barrett
LW	11	(Ireland) James Lowe
FH	10	(Ireland) Sam Prendergast	(substituted off) 69'
SH	9	(Ireland) Luke McGrath	(substituted off) 69'
N8	8	(Ireland) Jack Conan (c)	(substituted off) 75'
OF	7	(Ireland) Josh van der Flier
BF	6	(Ireland) Ryan Baird
RL	5	(Ireland) James Ryan	(substituted off) 43'
LL	4	(Ireland) Joe McCarthy
TP	3	(Ireland) Thomas Clarkson	(substituted off) 56'
HK	2	(Ireland) Dan Sheehan	(substituted off) 56'
LP	1	(Ireland) Andrew Porter	(substituted off) 75'
Substitutions:
HK	16	(Ireland) Rónan Kelleher	(substituted on) 56'
PR	17	(Ireland) Jack Boyle	(substituted on) 75'
PR	18	(France) Rabah Slimani	(substituted on) 56'
LK	19	(South Africa) RG Snyman	(substituted on) 43'
N8	20	(Ireland) Max Deegan	(substituted on) 75'
SH	21	(Ireland) Fintan Gunne	(substituted on) 69'
FH	22	(Ireland) Ross Byrne	(substituted on) 69'
CE	23	(Ireland) Jamie Osborne	(substituted on) 75'
Coach:
(Ireland) Leo Cullen

FB	15	(South Africa) Willie le Roux
RW	14	(South Africa) Canan Moodie
OC	13	(South Africa) David Kriel
IC	12	(South Africa) Harold Vorster
LW	11	(South Africa) Sebastian de Klerk	(substituted off) 65'
FH	10	(South Africa) Johan Goosen	(substituted off) 69'
SH	9	(South Africa) Embrose Papier	(substituted off) 72'
N8	8	(South Africa) Marcell Coetzee	(substituted off) 65'
OF	7	(South Africa) Ruan Nortjé (c)
BF	6	(South Africa) Marco van Staden
RL	5	(South Africa) JF van Heerden
LL	4	(South Africa) Cobus Wiese	(substituted off) 37'
TP	3	(South Africa) Wilco Louw	(substituted off) 65'
HK	2	(South Africa) Johan Grobbelaar	(substituted off) 45'
LP	1	(South Africa) Jan-Hendrik Wessels	(substituted off) 52'
Substitutions:
HK	16	(South Africa) Akker van der Merwe	(substituted on) 45'
PR	17	(South Africa) Alulutho Tshakweni	(substituted on) 52'
PR	18	(South Africa) Mornay Smith	(substituted on) 65'
LK	19	(South Africa) Jannes Kirsten	(substituted on) 37'
N8	20	(South Africa) Nizaam Carr	(substituted on) 65'
SH	21	(South Africa) Zak Burger	(substituted on) 72'
FH	22	(South Africa) Keagan Johannes	(substituted on) 69'
WG	23	(South Africa) Devon Williams	(substituted on) 65'
Coach:
(South Africa) Jake White

Man of the Match:
Ryan Baird (Leinster)

Assistant referees:
Mike Adamson (Scotland)
Sam Grove-White (Scotland)
Television match official:
Matteo Liperini (Italy)

== Broadcasting ==
The match was shown live by SuperSport in South Africa, by Premier Sports in the United Kingdom and by TG4 in Ireland. Flo Rugby & URC.tv carried coverage elsewhere.
