= 2019 Pro14 Grand Final =

Rugby union match

- Event: 2018–19 Pro14
Glasgow Warriors	Leinster
(Scotland)	(Ireland)
15	18
- Date: 25 May 2019
- Venue: Celtic Park, Glasgow
- Man of the Match: Cian Healy (Leinster)
- Referee: Nigel Owens (WRU)
- Attendance: 47,128
- Weather: Rain

The 2019 Pro14 Grand Final was the final match of the 2018–19 Pro14 season. The 2018–19 season is the fifth with Guinness as the title sponsor, the tenth with a Grand Final and the second season with 14 teams, following the admission of two South African teams. The final was played between Glasgow Warriors and Leinster and was played at the 60,000 seater, Celtic Park in Glasgow. Leinster won the game 18–15 to retain the title.

== Route to the final ==
The top side from each of the two conferences are given a bye to the semi-finals and have home advantage. Teams placed second and third in opposite conferences meet in the two quarter-finals to determine the other two semi-finalists with the teams ranked second having home advantage.

The play-offs are scheduled in the four weeks after the regular season has been completed.

Quarter-finals
(Ireland) Ulster (B2)	21
(Ireland) Connacht (A3)	13
(Ireland) Munster (A2)	15
(Italy) Benetton (B3)	13

Semi-finals
(Scotland) Glasgow Warriors (A1)	50
(Ireland) Ulster (B2)	20
(Ireland) Leinster (B1)	24
(Ireland) Munster (A2)	9

Pro14 Final
(Scotland) Glasgow Warriors	15
(Ireland) Leinster	18

=== Quarter-finals ===
4 May 2019
15:00

Munster (Ireland)	15–13	(Italy) Benetton
Pen: Bleyendaal (2/2) 22', 43'; Hanrahan (3/3) 62', 65', 76'	Report	Try: Ratuva Tavuyara 39' c Con: Allan (1/1) 40'; Pen: Allan (2/2) 25', 59'

Thomond Park
Attendance: 10,042
Referee: Nigel Owens (WRU)

4 May 2019
17:35

Ulster (Ireland)	21–13	(Ireland) Connacht
Try: Timoney 14' m Coetzee 77' c Con: Burns (1/1) 78'; Pen: Cooney (3/3) 4', 40', 61'	Report	Try: Aki 54' c Con: J. Carty (1/1) 55'; Pen: J. Carty (2/3) 29', 67'

Kingspan Stadium
Attendance: 15,215
Referee: Andrew Brace (IRFU)

=== Semi-finals ===
17 May 2019
19:35

Glasgow Warriors (Scotland)	50–20	(Ireland) Ulster
Try: Seymour (2) 2' c, 54' m Price 16' c Harley 38' c Steyn 58' c P. Horne 67' c G. Horne 75' c Con: Hastings (6/7) 3', 18', 39', 58', 68', 76'; Pen: Hastings (1/1) 28'	Report	Try: Coetzee 60' m Herring 71' c Lowry 79' m Con: Burns (1/3) 71'; Pen: Cooney (1/1) 30'

Scotstoun Stadium
Attendance: 10,000
Referee: John Lacey (IRFU)

18 May 2019
14:30

Leinster (Ireland)	24–9	(Ireland) Munster
Try: Cronin 54' c Lowe 79' m Con: R. Byrne (1/1) 55'; Pen: R. Byrne (4/4) 2', 34', 40'+6, 45'	Report	Pen: Carbery (3/3) 5', 24', 50'

RDS Arena
Attendance: 18,977
Referee: Mike Adamson (SRU)

== Pre-match ==
Leinster head coach Leo Cullen caused a media stir ahead of the final when he commented that all the Glasgow Warriors players were Rangers fans, and that Leinster would get support from Celtic fans as they (Leinster) were an Irish team. Some quarters reacted angrily to Cullen's comments, as they were seen as being provocative and sectarian, given the Catholic–Protestant history between Rangers and Celtic. Cullen appeared to make the remarks jokingly, but nonetheless he apologised for any offence given in a press conference held the day before the final.

== Final ==
=== Details ===
25 May 2019
18:30 BST UTC+1

Glasgow Warriors	15–18	Leinster
Try: M. Fagerson 13' c Stewart 74' m Con: Hastings (1/2) 14'; Pen: Hastings (1/1) 22'	Report	Try: Ringrose 15' m Healy 27' c Con: Sexton (1/2) 29'; Pen: Sexton (2/3) 35', 51'

Celtic Park, Glasgow
Attendance: 47,128
Referee: Nigel Owens (WRU)

Glasgow Warriors	Leinster

FB	15	(Scotland) Stuart Hogg	(substituted off) 65'
RW	14	(Scotland) Tommy Seymour
OC	13	(Scotland) Kyle Steyn		(yellow card) 49' to 59'
IC	12	(Scotland) Sam Johnson	(substituted off) 55'
LW	11	(Canada) D. T. H. van der Merwe
FH	10	(Scotland) Adam Hastings
SH	9	(Scotland) Ali Price	(substituted off) 57'
N8	8	(Scotland) Matt Fagerson
OF	7	(New Zealand) Callum Gibbins (c)	(substituted off) 78'
BF	6	(Scotland) Rob Harley	(substituted off) 51'
RL	5	(Scotland) Jonny Gray
LL	4	(Scotland) Scott Cummings
TP	3	(Scotland) Zander Fagerson	(substituted off) 66'
HK	2	(Scotland) Fraser Brown	(substituted off) 25'
LP	1	(Scotland) Jamie Bhatti	(substituted off) 51'
Substitutions:
HK	16	(Scotland) Grant Stewart	(substituted in) 25'
PR	17	(Scotland) Oli Kebble	(substituted in) 51'
PR	18	(Tonga) Siua Halanukonuka	(substituted in) 66'
FL	19	(Scotland) Ryan Wilson	(substituted in) 51'
FL	20	(Scotland) Tom Gordon	(substituted in) 78'
SH	21	(Scotland) George Horne	(substituted in) 57'
CE	22	(Scotland) Peter Horne	(substituted in) 55'
CE	23	(Scotland) Huw Jones	(substituted in) 65'
Coach:
(New Zealand) Dave Rennie

FB	15	(Ireland) Rob Kearney		(yellow card) 65' to 75'
RW	14	(Ireland) Jordan Larmour
OC	13	(Ireland) Garry Ringrose
IC	12	(Ireland) Robbie Henshaw
LW	11	(Ireland) James Lowe
FH	10	(Ireland) Johnny Sexton (c)	(substituted off) 73'
SH	9	(Ireland) Luke McGrath	(substituted off) 76'
N8	8	(Ireland) Jack Conan
OF	7	(Ireland) Josh van der Flier	(substituted off) 73'
BF	6	(Ireland) Rhys Ruddock	(substituted off) 78'
RL	5	(Ireland) James Ryan
LL	4	(Australia) Scott Fardy
TP	3	(Ireland) Tadhg Furlong	(substituted off) 63'
HK	2	(Ireland) Seán Cronin	(substituted off) 63'
LP	1	(Ireland) Cian Healy	(substituted off) 62'
Substitutions:
HK	16	(Ireland) Bryan Byrne	(substituted in) 63'
PR	17	(Ireland) Ed Byrne	(substituted in) 62'
PR	18	(Ireland) Andrew Porter	(substituted in) 63'
LK	19	(Ireland) Ross Molony	(substituted in) 78'
FL	20	(Ireland) Max Deegan	(substituted in) 73'
SH	21	(Ireland) Nick McCarthy	(substituted in) 76'
CE	22	(Ireland) Ross Byrne	(substituted in) 73'
WG	23	(Ireland) Rory O'Loughlin
Coach:
(Ireland) Leo Cullen

Man of the Match:
(Ireland) Cian Healy

Touch judges:
Mike Adamson (SRU)
John Lacey (IRFU)
Television Match Official:
Ian Davies (WRU)
