= 2010 Celtic League Grand Final =

Rugby union match

2009-10 Celtic League Grand Final
- Event: 2009–10 Celtic League
Leinster	Ospreys
(Ireland)	(Wales)
12	17
- Date: 29 May 2010
- Venue: RDS Arena, Dublin
- Man of the Match: Lee Byrne
- Referee: Chris White (RFU)
- Attendance: 19,850
- Weather: Dry

The 2009–10 Celtic League Grand Final was the final match of the 2009–10 Celtic League season. The 2009–10 season was the fourth sponsored by Magners and was the first ever Celtic League Grand Final. The final was won by the Ospreys who defeated Leinster by 17–12 at the RDS Arena to win their third Celtic League title, the win ended Leinster's 20-month unbeaten home league record.

== Route to the final ==
=== 2009–10 Final Table ===
Key to colours
Top four teams advance to playoffs.

	Team	Pld	W	D	L	PF	PA	PD	TF	TA	Try bonus	Losing bonus	Pts
1	(Ireland) Leinster	18	13	0	5	359	295	+64	27	29	1	2	55
2	(Wales) Ospreys	18	11	1	6	384	298	+86	37	26	3	3	52
3	(Scotland) Glasgow Warriors	18	11	2	5	390	321	+69	31	24	2	1	51
4	(Ireland) Munster	18	9	0	9	319	282	+37	33	20	3	6	45
5	(Wales) Cardiff Blues	18	10	0	8	349	315	+34	33	28	2	2	44
6	(Scotland) Edinburgh	18	8	0	10	385	391	−6	40	40	4	5	41
7	(Wales) Newport Gwent Dragons	18	8	1	9	333	378	−45	32	37	3	2	39
8	(Ireland) Ulster	18	7	1	10	357	370	−13	39	35	4	2	36
9	(Wales) Scarlets	18	5	0	13	361	382	−21	35	35	1	8	29
10	(Ireland) Connacht	18	5	1	12	254	459	−205	20	53	0	4	26

=== Semi-finals ===
14 May 2010
19:05

Ospreys (Wales)	20 – 5	(Scotland) Glasgow Warriors
Try: Williams 9' c Hook 54' c Con: Biggar (2/2); Pen: Biggar (2) 51', 79'	Report	Try: Thomson 42' m

Liberty Stadium
Attendance: 7,079
Referee: George Clancy

15 May 2010
20:00

Leinster (Ireland)	16 – 6	(Ireland) Munster
Try: Kearney 44' c Con: Sexton; Pen: Sexton (3) 18', 50', 58'	Report	Pen: O'Gara 29'; Drop: O'Gara 41'

RDS Arena
Attendance: 19,750
Referee: Nigel Owens

== Match ==
=== Summary ===
First-half Ospreys tries from Tommy Bowe after 20 minutes and Lee Byrne after 35 minutes which were both converted put the Ospreys 14–3 up at half time, with the Leinster score coming from a Johnny Sexton penalty after 23 minutes. A further penalty from Sexton brought the score to 14–6 before Dan Biggar kicked over a penalty for the Ospreys after 48 minutes. Two more penalties from Sexton in the 62nd and 71st minutes made the score 17–12, but that was enough for the Ospreys to hold and become the first side to win the title for the third time.

=== Details ===
29 May 2010
18:30

Leinster (Ireland)	12–17	(Wales) Ospreys
Pen: Sexton (4) 23', 45', 62' ,71'	Report	Try: Bowe 20' c Byrne 35' c Con: Biggar (2/2); Pen: Biggar 48'

RDS Arena
Attendance: 19,850
Referee: Chris White

15	Rob Kearney
14	Shane Horgan
13	Brian O'Driscoll
12	Gordon D'Arcy
11	Isa Nacewa
10	Johnny Sexton
9	Eoin Reddan
8	Jamie Heaslip
7	Shane Jennings (c)
6	Kevin McLaughlin
5	Malcolm O'Kelly
4	Nathan Hines
3	CJ van der Linde
2	John Fogarty
1	Stan Wright
Replacements:
16	Richardt Strauss
17	Cian Healy
18	Trevor Hogan
19	Stephen Keogh
20	Paul O'Donohoe
21	Fergus McFadden
22	Girvan Dempsey
Coach:
Michael Ceika

15	Lee Byrne
14	Tommy Bowe
13	Andrew Bishop
12	James Hook
11	Shane Williams
10	Dan Biggar
9	Mike Phillips
8	Ryan Jones (c)
7	Marty Holah
6	Jerry Collins
5	Jonathan Thomas
4	Alun Wyn Jones
3	Adam Rhys Jones
2	Huw Bennett
1	Paul James
Replacements:
16	Ed Shervington
17	Ryan Bevington
18	Ian Gough
19	Filo Tiatia
20	Jamie Nutbrown
21	Gareth Owen
22	Nikki Walker
Coach:
Scott Johnson

== Reaction ==
Ospreys head coach Sean Holley reacted to the win saying "it's a special night, I wouldn't say it was our best performance, but certainly one of our most courageous and determined." "Leinster are pretty outstanding in defence, and it's the end of a long, hard season, I'm not that surprised (we cut through them), because we have some great talent." Departing Leinster coach Michael Cheika reacted to the loss by saying "Ospreys deserved the win but we're disappointed with ourselves. We didn't play well, we tried to fight our way back into the game, but we made too many mistakes. We probably just weren't accurate in the defensive section or where we needed to be in the team."
