= 2024 United Rugby Championship Grand Final =

Rugby union match

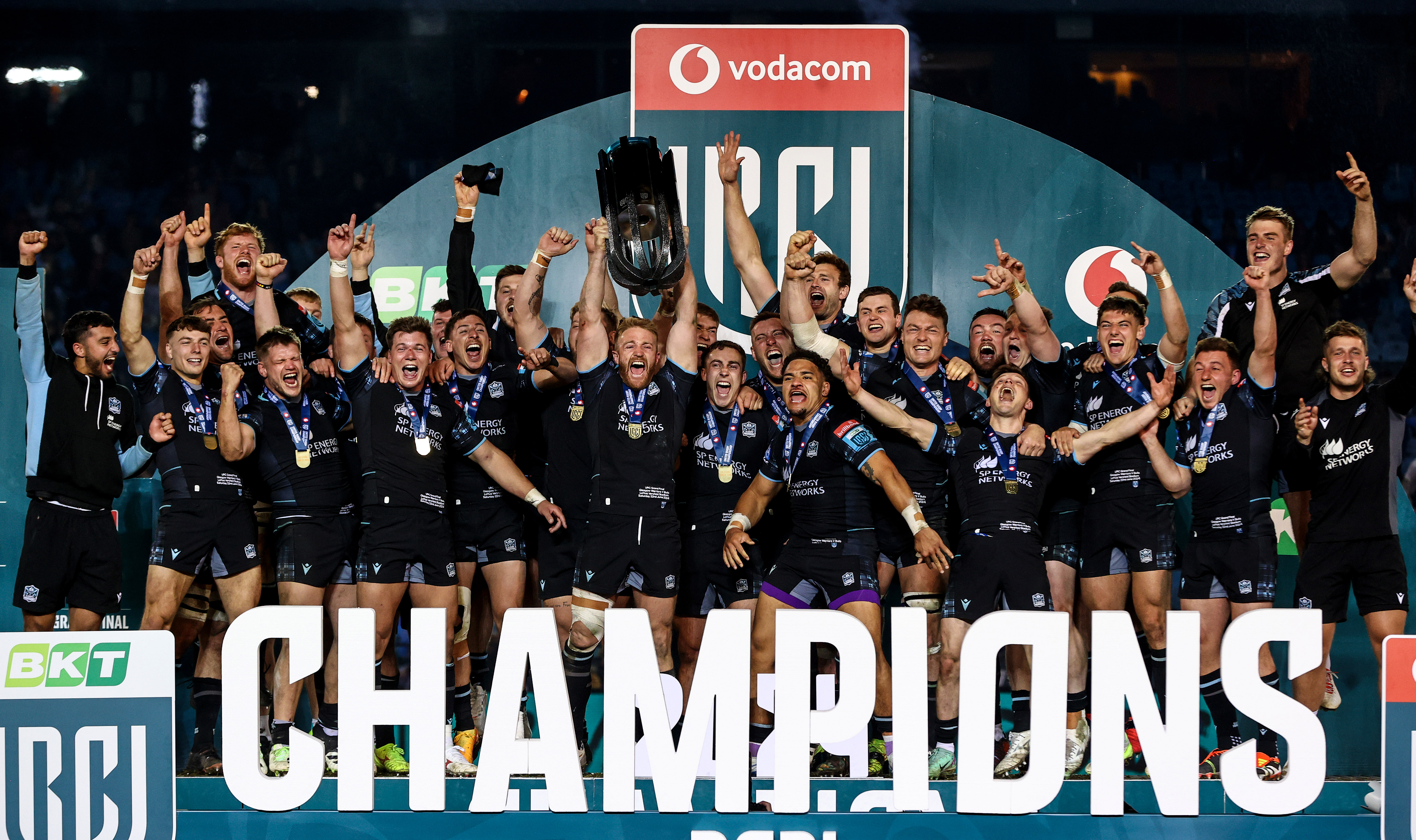
- Glasgow Warriors celebrate their second URC title
- Event: 2023–24 United Rugby Championship
Bulls	Glasgow Warriors
(South Africa)	(Scotland)
16	21
- Date: 22 June 2024
- Venue: Loftus Versfeld Stadium, Pretoria
- Man of the Match: Matt Fagerson (Glasgow Warriors)
- Referee: Andrea Piardi (Italy)
- Attendance: 50,388

The 2024 United Rugby Championship Grand Final was the final match of the 2023–24 United Rugby Championship (URC) season. It was contested by the Bulls from South Africa and Scotland's Glasgow Warriors. Glasgow won the match 21–16, coming back from 13–0 down just before half-time to claim their second URC title.

The final was held in South Africa for the third time in succession, with a second appearance for the Bulls following their defeat in 2022, and a first appearance for Glasgow Warriors who are the first Scottish team, and the first team outside of South Africa and Ireland, to reach the final since the competition adopted its current format. For the third year in succession, the top-seeded team at the start of the play-offs failed to reach the final.

== Route to the final ==
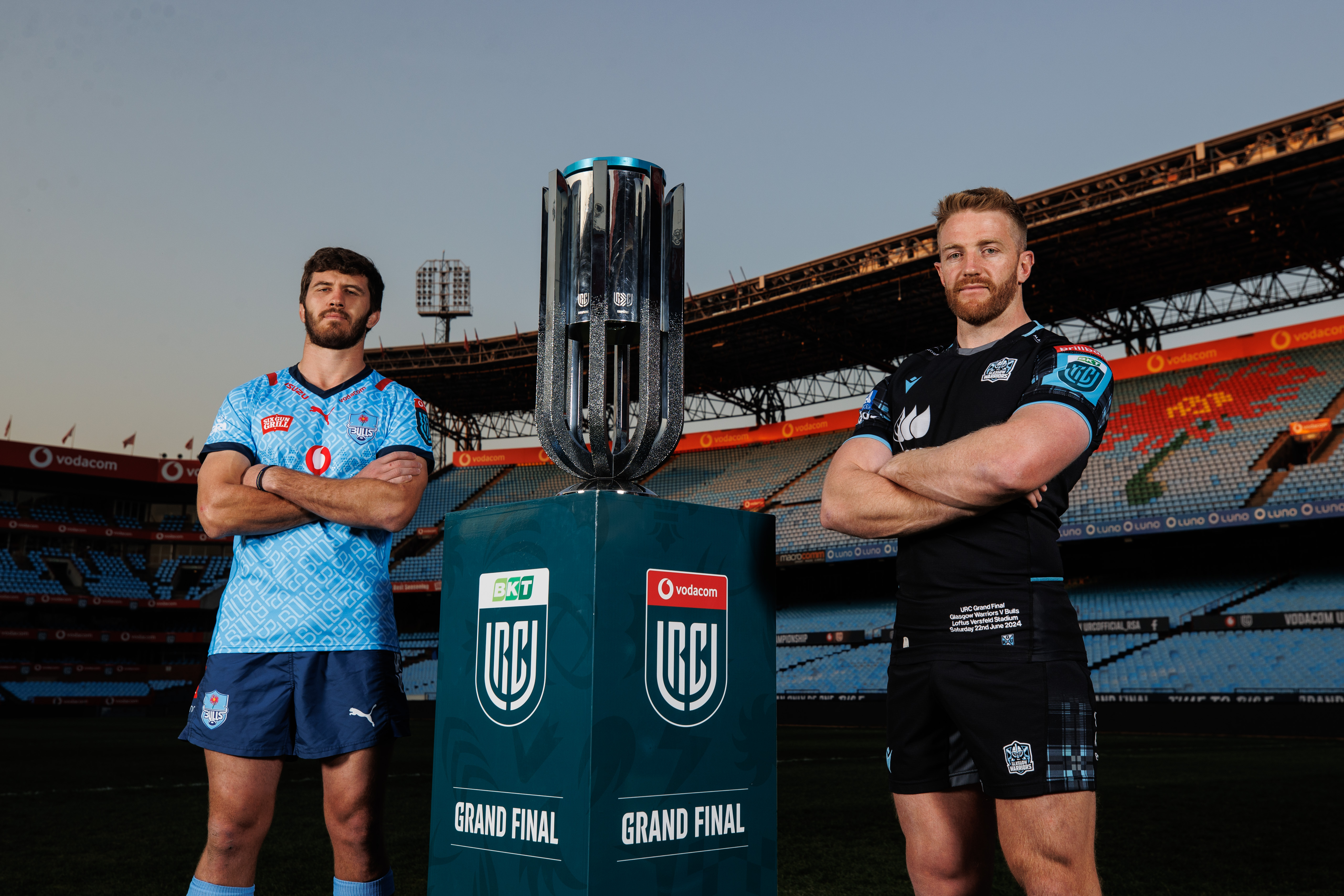
The captains of the Bulls and the Glasgow Warriors pose with the URC trophy at Loftus Versfeld Stadium.

Note: In all results below, the score of the finalist is given first (H: home; A: away).

(South Africa) Bulls		Round	(Scotland) Glasgow Warriors	
League
Pos / Team / P / W / D / L / PF / PA / PD / TF / TA / TB / LB / Pts; 1 / (Ireland) Munster / 18 / 13 / 1 / 4 / 483 / 318 / +165 / 65 / 38 / 11 / 3 / 68; 2 / (South Africa) Bulls / 18 / 13 / 0 / 5 / 639 / 433 / +206 / 85 / 54 / 11 / 3 / 66; 3 / (Ireland) Leinster / 18 / 13 / 0 / 5 / 554 / 350 / +204 / 81 / 43 / 11 / 2 / 65; 4 / (Scotland) Glasgow Warriors / 18 / 13 / 0 / 5 / 519 / 353 / +166 / 76 / 35 / 11 / 2 / 65; 5 / (South Africa) Stormers / 18 / 12 / 0 / 6 / 468 / 348 / +120 / 58 / 45 / 7 / 4 / 59; 6 / (Ireland) Ulster / 18 / 11 / 0 / 7 / 437 / 409 / +28 / 53 / 55 / 5 / 5 / 54; 7 / (Italy) Benetton / 18 / 11 / 1 / 6 / 411 / 400 / +11 / 51 / 56 / 6 / 2 / 54; 8 / (Wales) Ospreys / 18 / 10 / 0 / 8 / 414 / 449 / –35 / 53 / 53 / 8 / 2 / 50
Opponent	Result	Play-offs	Opponent	Result
(Italy) Benetton (H)	30–23	Quarter-finals	(South Africa) Stormers (H)	27–10
(Ireland) Leinster (H)	25–20	Semi-finals	(Ireland) Munster (A)	17–10

== Match ==
=== Venue ===
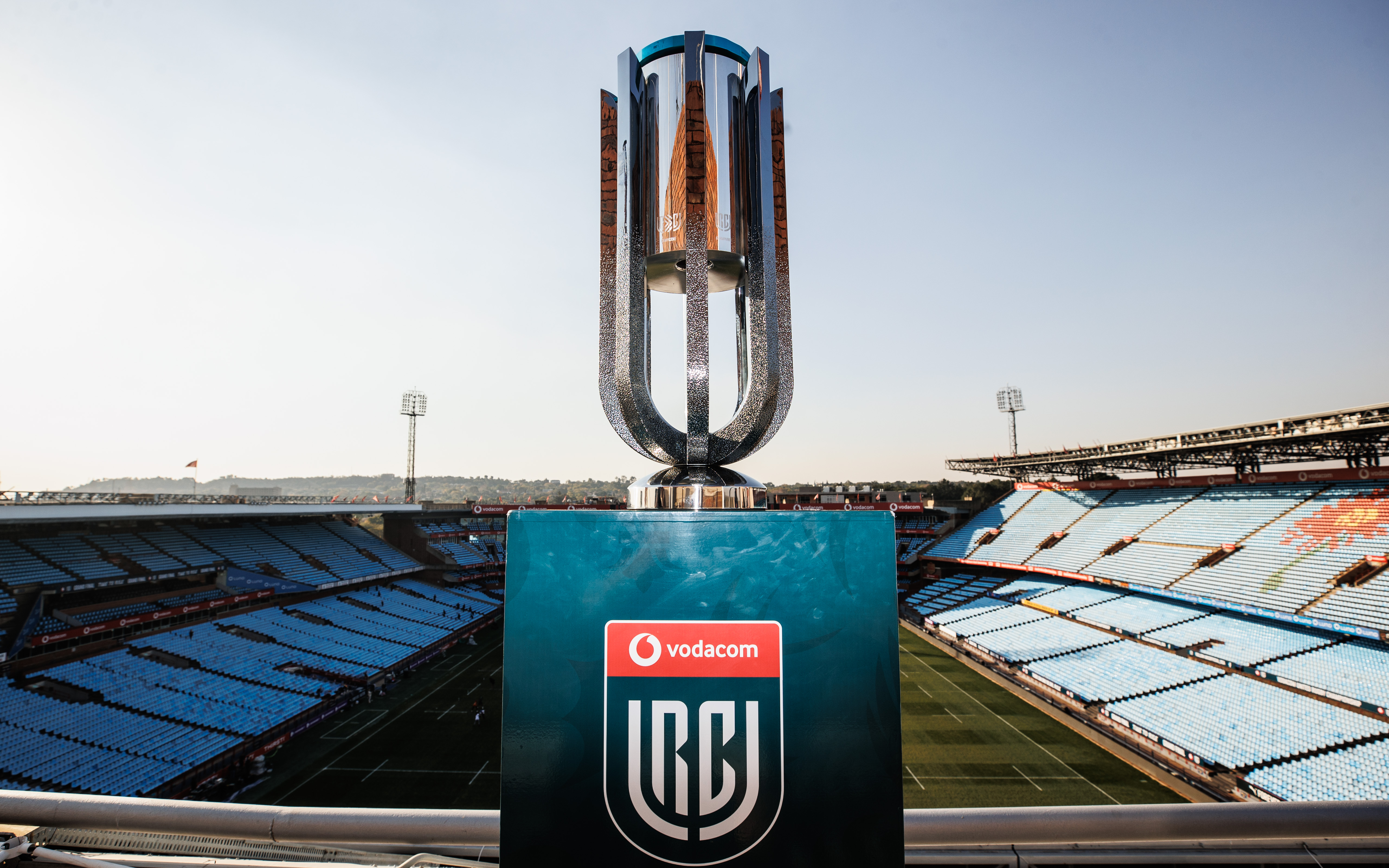
The URC trophy on display at Loftus Versfeld Stadium before the 2024 Grand Final

With Glasgow's elimination of top-ranked Munster in the semi-finals, the Bulls were the highest-ranked team to reach the final; they nominated their usual home of Loftus Versfeld Stadium in Pretoria, which has a listed capacity of 50,000, as the venue for the final. It was the third year in a row that the final had been played in South Africa, but the first time it had been played at Loftus Versfeld, although the stadium had previously hosted the 2009 Super 14 final, in which the Bulls beat the Chiefs 61–17.

=== Officials ===
Italian referee Andrea Piardi was named as the main official for the match, taking charge of his second United Rugby Championship final in succession. He made his Six Nations Championship debut in 2024, refereeing the game between Ireland and Wales, and was also part of the refereeing team for the 2023 Rugby World Cup in France. His assistants for the final were Ireland's Frank Murphy and Wales's Craig Evans, while fellow Italian Matteo Liperini served as the Television Match Official (TMO).

=== Team selection ===
The two teams named their squads for the final the day before the match. The Bulls made just one change to the team that beat Leinster in the semi-final, bringing in Kurt-Lee Arendse for Willie le Roux, who had failed a head injury assessment (HIA) after the Leinster match; Devon Williams moved across to full-back in place of Le Roux, while Arendse, who had undergone cheekbone surgery after the quarter-final against Benetton two weeks earlier, took Williams' place on the wing. On the bench, Zak Burger came in for Keagan Johannes as the replacement scrum-half. Glasgow named the same starting XV as in their semi-final, but made two changes on the bench as prop Nathan McBeth and fly-half Duncan Weir came in for Murphy Walker and Ross Thompson respectively. They were forced into one more change before kick-off as lock Max Williamson failed to recover from an illness and was replaced by Gregor Brown.

=== Summary ===
The Bulls took an early lead in the match when Johan Goosen kicked a second-minute penalty from near the right touchline between the halfway line and the Glasgow 10-metre line. Goosen added another penalty in the 15th minute, before the Bulls scored the game's opening try 10 minutes later; following a line-out, the Glasgow defence failed to tackle Marco van Staden as he peeled off the back of a maul and he powered over from 10 metres out; Goosen kicked the conversion. As the first half drew to a close, Glasgow managed to reduce the deficit to 13–7 as Scott Cummings burrowed over the line from short range following a nine-phase attack, before George Horne converted.

Six minutes after the break, Goosen extended the Bulls' lead to nine points with another penalty, but just two minutes later, Glasgow reduced it down to two points as replacement hooker George Turner finished off a driving maul, and Horne again kicked the conversion. Just after the hour mark, the Glasgow backs took over, going wing-to-wing to allow Kyle Steyn to put Huw Jones over on the left flank; Horne again converted to put Glasgow in front for the first time in the game. They thought they had extended their lead five minutes later, when Jack Dempsey thought he had scored a 60-metre interception try, only for the Television Match Official to bring it back for an early tackle by Turner. Inside the last five minutes, Glasgow were reduced to 14 men after Tom Jordan was yellow-carded for a high tackle, and as the clock turned red, the Bulls attempted to drive over from a five-metre line-out. However, despite their numerical disadvantage, the Warriors were able to prevent the score. This secured a 21–16 victory for the Warriors, giving them their second URC title having won the competition in 2015 when it still known as the Pro12.

=== Details ===
22 June 2024
18:00 SAST (UTC+2)

(2) Bulls (South Africa)	16–21	(Scotland) Glasgow Warriors (4)
Try: Van Staden 24'; Con: Goosen (1/1) 25'; Pen: Goosen (3) 1', 14', 51'		Try: Cummings 40'; Turner 53'; Jones 62'; Con: Horne (3/3) 40+2', 54', 64'

Loftus Versfeld Stadium, Pretoria
Attendance: 50,388
Referee: Andrea Piardi (Italy)

FB	15	(South Africa) Devon Williams
RW	14	(South Africa) Sergeal Petersen
OC	13	(South Africa) David Kriel
IC	12	(South Africa) Harold Vorster
LW	11	(South Africa) Kurt-Lee Arendse
FH	10	(South Africa) Johan Goosen
SH	9	(South Africa) Embrose Papier
N8	8	(South Africa) Cameron Hanekom	(substituted off) 47'
OF	7	(South Africa) Elrigh Louw
BF	6	(South Africa) Marco van Staden
RL	5	(South Africa) Ruan Nortjé
LL	4	(South Africa) Ruan Vermaak	(substituted off) 67'
TP	3	(South Africa) Wilco Louw	(substituted off) 73'
HK	2	(South Africa) Johan Grobbelaar	(substituted off) 50'
LP	1	(South Africa) Gerhard Steenekamp	(substituted off) 73'
Substitutions:
HK	16	(South Africa) Akker van der Merwe	(substituted in) 50'
PR	17	(South Africa) Simphiwe Matanzima	(substituted in) 73'
PR	18	(South Africa) Francois Klopper	(substituted in) 73'
LK	19	(South Africa) Reinhardt Ludwig	(substituted in) 67'
FL	20	(South Africa) Nizaam Carr	(substituted in) 47'
SH	21	(South Africa) Zak Burger
FH	22	(South Africa) Chris Smith
CE	23	(South Africa) Cornel Smit
Coach:
(South Africa) Jake White

FB	15	(New Zealand) Josh McKay
RW	14	(Argentina) Sebastián Cancelliere		(substituted off) 59'
OC	13	(Scotland) Huw Jones
IC	12	(Scotland) Sione Tuipulotu
LW	11	(Scotland) Kyle Steyn
FH	10	(New Zealand) Tom Jordan	(yellow card) 77'
SH	9	(Scotland) George Horne
N8	8	(Scotland) Jack Dempsey
OF	7	(Scotland) Rory Darge		(substituted off) 59'
BF	6	(Scotland) Matt Fagerson
RL	5	(Scotland) Richie Gray		(substituted off) 59'
LL	4	(Scotland) Scott Cummings
TP	3	(Scotland) Zander Fagerson
HK	2	(Scotland) Johnny Matthews		(substituted off) 45'
LP	1	(Scotland) Jamie Bhatti		(substituted off) 45'
Substitutions:
HK	16	(Scotland) George Turner		(substituted in) 45'
PR	17	(Scotland) Nathan McBeth		(substituted in) 45'
PR	18	(Scotland) Oli Kebble
LK	19	(Scotland) Gregor Brown		(substituted in) 59'
FL	20	(Scotland) Euan Ferrie
FL	21	(South Africa) Henco Venter		(substituted in) 59'
SH	22	(Scotland) Jamie Dobie		(substituted in) 59'
FH	23	(Scotland) Duncan Weir
Coach:
(South Africa) Franco Smith

Man of the Match:
Matt Fagerson (Glasgow Warriors)

Assistant referees:
Frank Murphy (Ireland)
Craig Evans (Wales)
Television match official:
Matteo Liperini (Italy)

=== Statistics ===
Statistic	Bulls	Glasgow Warriors
Tries	1	3
Possession	51%	49%
Clean breaks	3	8
Defenders beaten	14	41
Offloads	14	4
Territory	46%	54%
Tackles	176	180
Missed tackles	41	14
Tackle success	81%	93%
Turnovers won	8	8
Penalties conceded	10	17
Kicks retained	2	1
Source: URC

== Broadcasting ==
The match was shown live by SuperSport in South Africa, by Premier Sports in the United Kingdom and by RTÉ in Ireland.
