= 2022 United Rugby Championship Grand Final =

Rugby union match

2022 United Rugby Championship final
- Event: 2021–22 United Rugby Championship
Stormers	Bulls
(South Africa)	(South Africa)
18	13
- Date: 18 June 2022
- Venue: Cape Town Stadium, Cape Town
- Referee: Andrew Brace
- Attendance: 31,000
- Weather: Cold

The 2022 United Rugby Championship final was the final match of the 2021–22 United Rugby Championship season. The first United Rugby Championship final was an all-South African derby with the Stormers defeating the Bulls 18–13 in Cape Town.

== Pre-match ==
The match was televised free-to-air by RTÉ 2 in the Republic of Ireland. It was also shown on Premier Sports in the UK.

== Details ==
18 June 2022
19:35

Stormers (South Africa)	18–13	(South Africa) Bulls
Try: Roos 45' c Venter 57' m Con: Libbok 46'; Pen: Libbok 43'; Drop: Libbok 75'	Report	Try: Vorster 3' c Con: Smith 4'; Pen: Smith (2) 43', 65'

Cape Town Stadium
Attendance: 31 000
Referee: Andrew Brace
