= Ringer (surname) =

Ringer is a surname. Notable people with the surname include:

== Entrepreneurs ==
- Frederick Ringer (1838–1907), British merchant
- Robert Ringer (born 1938), American entrepreneur

== Performers ==
- Catherine Ringer (born 1957), French singer-songwriter
- Jenifer Ringer, American ballet dancer and teacher
- Noah Ringer (born 1996), American actor

== Sportspeople ==
- Antony Ringer (born 1966), British sport shooter
- Derek Ringer (born 1956), Scottish rally co-driver
- Jamie Ringer (born 1976), Welsh rugby player
- Javon Ringer (born 1987), Michigan State University running back
- Joel Bennett Ringer (born 1996), Welsh rugby player
- Paul Ringer (born 1948), Welsh rugby player
- Richard Ringer (born 1989), German runner
- Thomas Ringer (1883–1969), British boxer

== Writers ==
- Armand T. Ringer, a pseudonym used by American writer Martin Gardner
- Mark Ringer (born 1959), American writer and theatre director

== Others ==
- Barbara Ringer (1925–2009), American civil servant
- Carolyn Ringer Lepre, American academic administrator
- Herb Ringer (1913–1998), American photographer
- Sydney Ringer (1836–1910), British clinician and pharmacologist, best known for inventing Lactated Ringer's solution
