= Ringer =

Ringer(s) may refer to:

== Sports and games ==
- Ringer, in sports idiom, an impostor, especially one whose pretense is intended to gain an advantage in a competition
- Road course ringer, a non-NASCAR driver hired to race at a road course
- A game piece used for scoring in the 2007 FIRST Robotics Competition game Rack 'n Roll
- In horseshoes, a shoe that encircles the stake
- Ringer or ring taw, a marbles game played in British and World Marbles Championship

== Fiction ==
- Ringer (comics), a Marvel Comics villain
- A member of Tolkien fandom
  - Ringers: Lord of the Fans, a documentary on the subject

== Film and television ==
- Ringer (film), a 1996 film starring Timothy Bottoms
- Ringer (TV series), starring Sarah Michelle Gellar
- "Ringer" (The Bill), a 1986 TV episode
- "Ringer" (The Sweeney), a 1975 TV episode

== Music ==
- Ringer (EP), an EP by Four Tet
- "Ringer" (song), a song by Godflesh

== Other ==
- Ringer (surname)
- Ringer Edwards (1913–2000), Australian soldier
- Bell-ringer, one who plays bells, especially church bells
- Lactated Ringer's solution, also known as Ringer's, a fluid used in medical treatment
- Intravenous sugar solution, usually glucose
- A term for an Australian stockman, in the Top End of the Northern Territory
- An ornithologist trained in bird ringing
- Ringing (telephony) or telephone ringer, an electrical device to alert a telephone subscriber to an incoming call
- A style of T-shirt
- A cut and shut or cloned car

== See also ==
- The Ringer (disambiguation)
- Dead Ringer (disambiguation)
- Wringer (disambiguation)
