= Ringoes, New Jersey =

Place in Hunterdon County, New Jersey, US

- Census-designated place
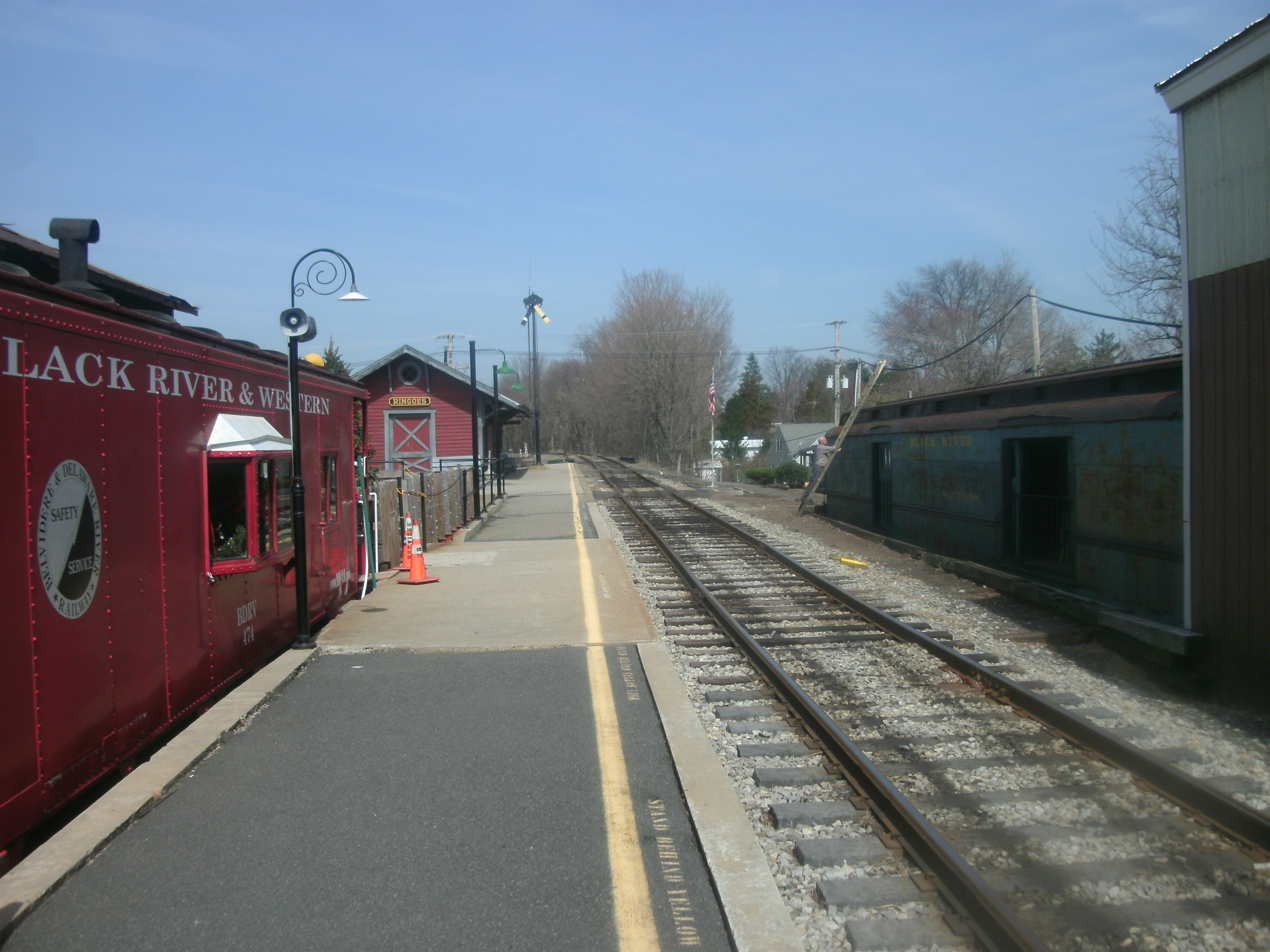
- A Black River and Western caboose, semaphore, and station depot at the station in Ringoes

- Location in Hunterdon County Location in New Jersey Location in the United States
- Coordinates: 40°25′44″N 74°52′04″W
- Country: United States
- State: New Jersey
- County: Hunterdon
- Township: East Amwell

Area
  - Total: 1.71 sq mi (4.44 km^{2})
  - Land: 1.71 sq mi (4.42 km^{2})
  - Water: 0.0077 sq mi (0.02 km^{2})
- Elevation: 220 ft (67 m)

Population (2020)
  - Total: 849
  - Density: 497.5/sq mi (192.07/km^{2})
- ZIP Code: 08551
- FIPS code: 34-63120
- GNIS feature ID: 0879697

Ringoes is an unincorporated community and census-designated place (CDP) located within East Amwell Township in Hunterdon County, in the U.S. state of New Jersey. The community is served by the United States Postal Service as ZIP Code 08551 and as of the 2020 United States census, the CDP's population was 849.

== History ==
- Ringoes Historic District
- U.S. National Register of Historic Places
- U.S. Historic district
- New Jersey Register of Historic Places
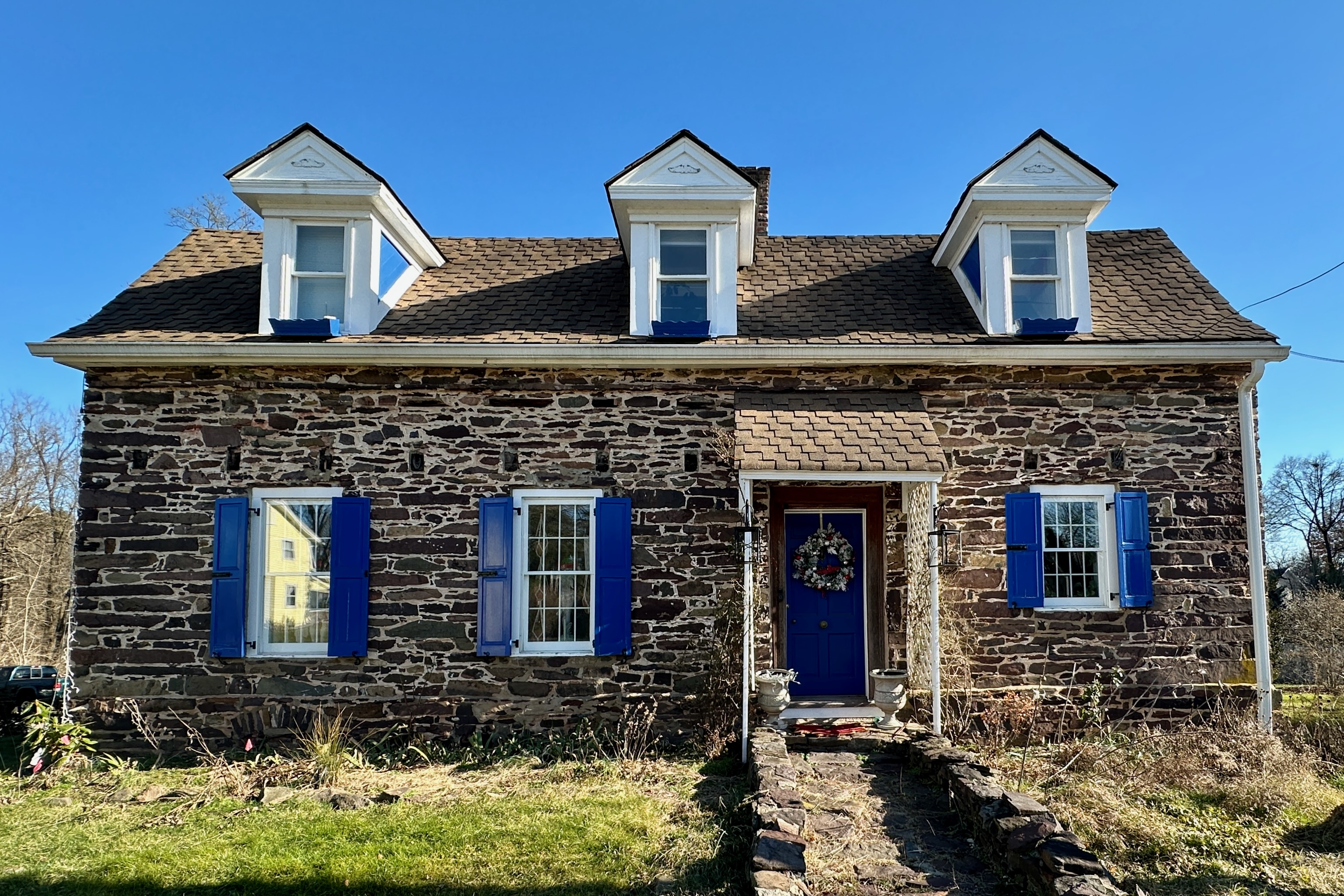
- Henry Landis House
- Location: Old York Road, John Ringo Road, Wertsville Road, Boss Road, and Larison Lane
- Area: 187 acres (76 ha)
- NRHP reference No.: 99001544
- NJRHP No.: 144

Significant dates
- Added to NRHP: December 20, 1999
- Designated NJRHP: October 12, 1999

Ringoes is the oldest known settlement in Hunterdon County, developing around John Ringo's Tavern on the Old York Road, now Route 179. The tavern was the site for many meetings of the Hunterdon Chapter of the Sons of Liberty formed in 1766, meetings especially war related were discussed in this tavern. Most of the community is part of the Ringoes Historic District. The 187-acre (76 ha) historic district was added to the National Register of Historic Places on December 20, 1999, for its significance in agriculture, architecture, education, industry, exploration, and transportation. The district includes 134 contributing buildings.

The Henry Landis House, the district's oldest extant building, was built in 1750 with Colonial Revival style. The Amwell Academy was built in 1811 with Federal style. The former Washington Hotel was built around 1838 with Colonial Revival style.

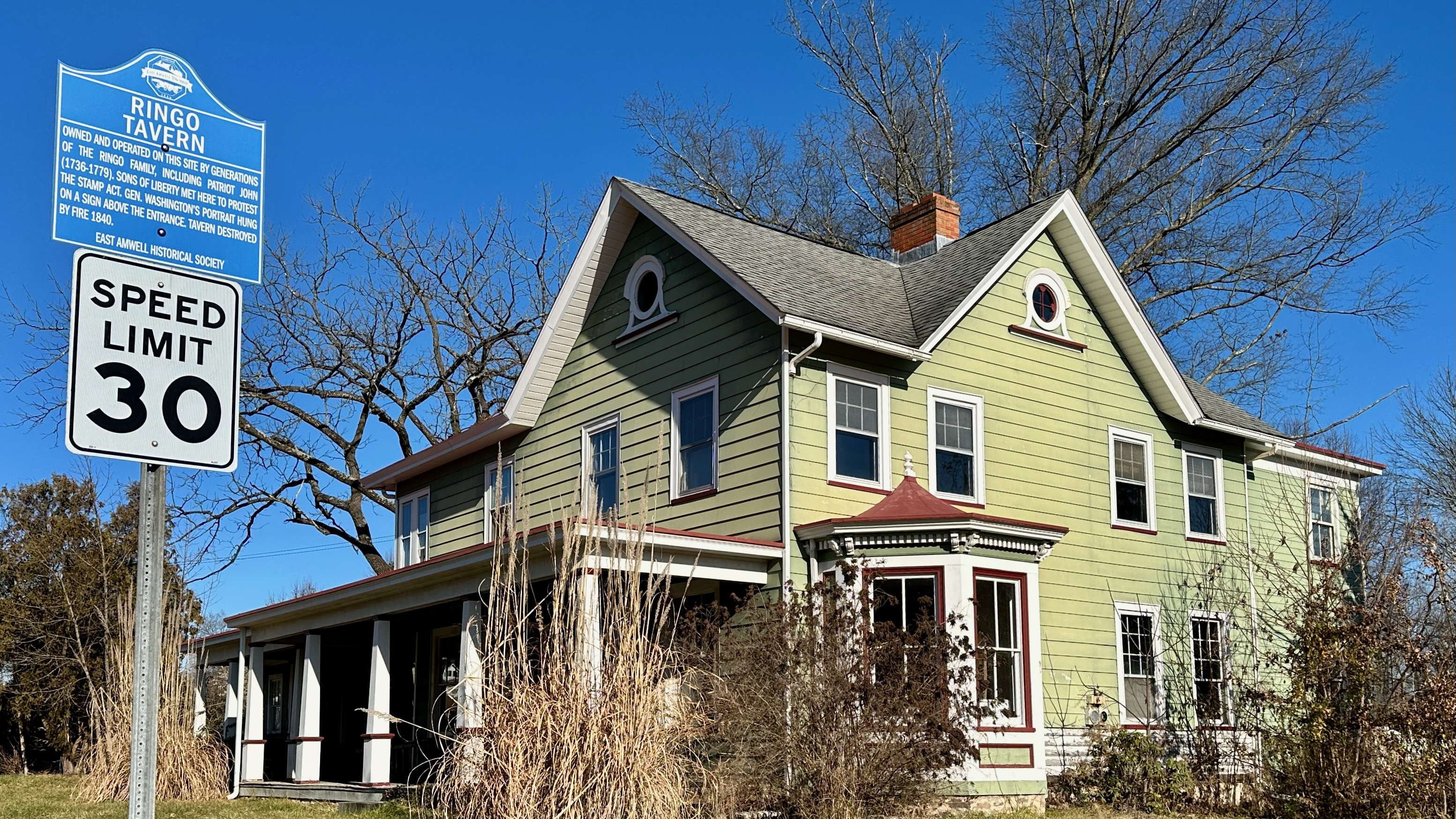
Site of John Ringo's Tavern on Old York Road

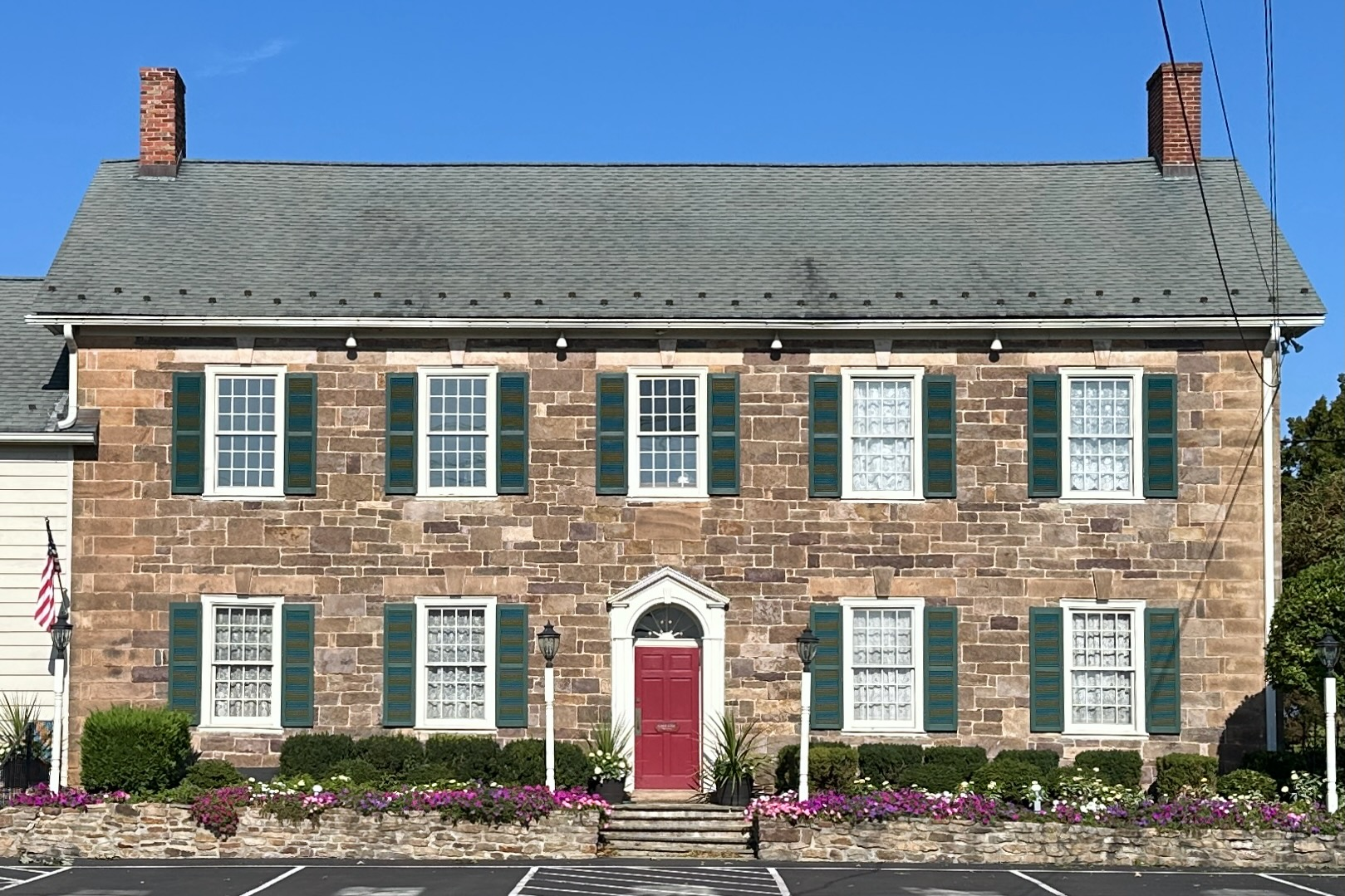
The former Amwell Academy, now the Harvest Moon Inn

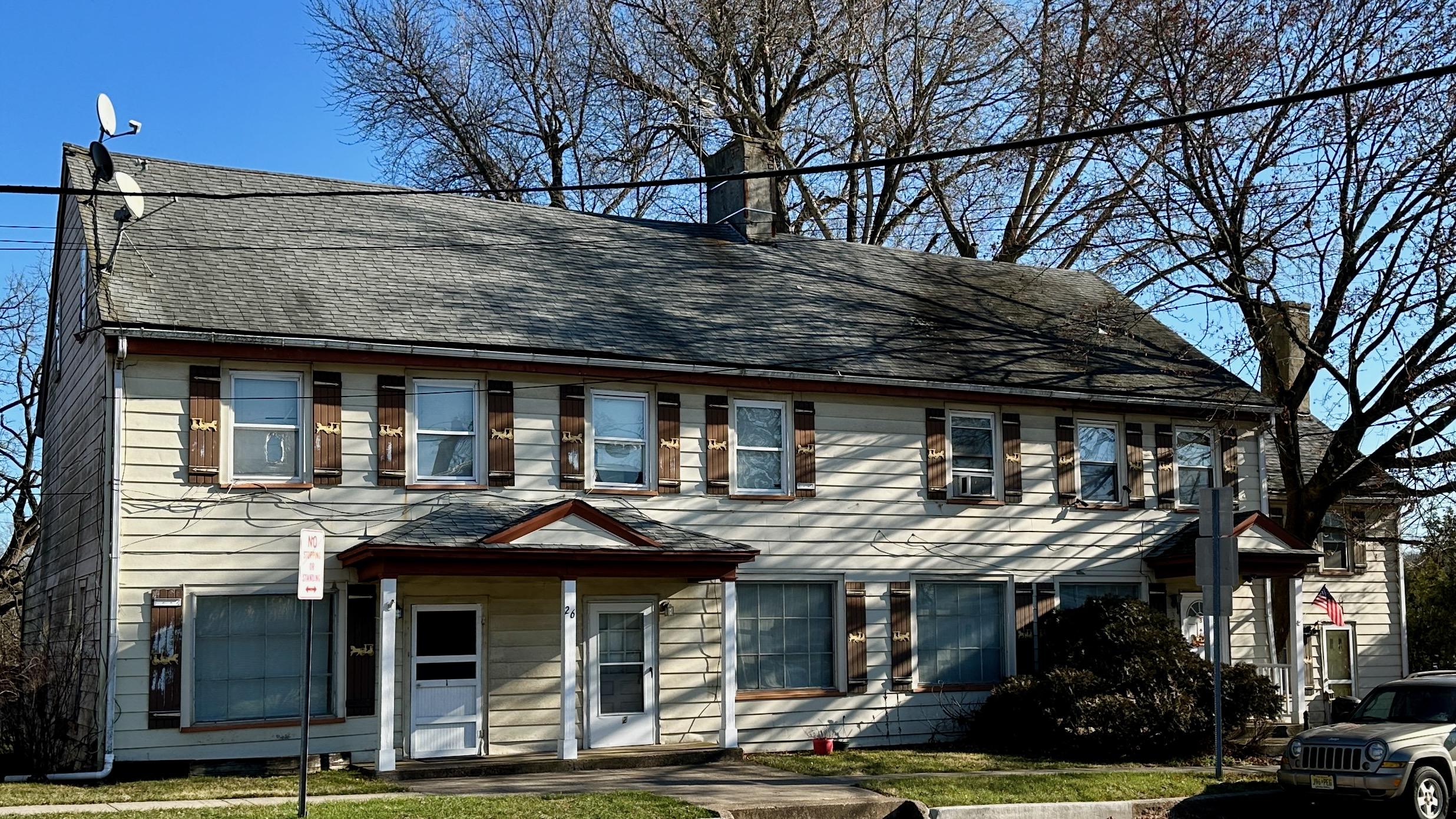
Former Washington Hotel

== Demographics ==
Historical population
| Census | Pop. | Note | %± |
|---|---|---|---|
| 2020 | 849 | | — |
U.S. Decennial Census

Ringoes was first listed as a census designated place in the 2020 U.S. census.

Ringoes CDP, New Jersey – Racial and ethnic composition Note: the US Census treats Hispanic/Latino as an ethnic category. This table excludes Latinos from the racial categories and assigns them to a separate category. Hispanics/Latinos may be of any race.
| Race / Ethnicity (NH = Non-Hispanic) | Pop 2020 | 2020 |
|---|---|---|
| White alone (NH) | 754 | 88.81% |
| Black or African American alone (NH) | 5 | 0.59% |
| Native American or Alaska Native alone (NH) | 2 | 0.24% |
| Asian alone (NH) | 15 | 1.77% |
| Native Hawaiian or Pacific Islander alone (NH) | 0 | 0.00% |
| Other race alone (NH) | 3 | 0.35% |
| Mixed race or Multiracial (NH) | 26 | 3.06% |
| Hispanic or Latino (any race) | 44 | 5.18% |
| Total | 849 | 100.00% |

== Notable people ==
People who were born in, residents of, or otherwise closely associated with Ringoes include:

- Hannah Altman (born 1995), photographer, whose artwork explores lineage, memory, ritual, and storytelling
- James Buchanan (1839–1900), represented New Jersey's 2nd congressional district from 1885 to 1893
- Matt Ioannidis (born 1994), defensive end for the Washington Redskins of the National Football League
- Andrew Maguire (born 1939), represented New Jersey's 7th congressional district from 1975 to 1981
- Tom Malinowski (born 1965), representative of New Jersey's 7th Congressional District in the United States House of Representatives from 2019 to 2023
- Stan Ploski Jr. (born 1944), retired dirt modified racing driver
- Horace Griggs Prall (1881–1951), acting Governor of New Jersey in 1935
- Jason Read (born 1977), rower who was a gold medalist in the Men's 8+ at the 2004 Summer Olympics
- Herb Ringer (1913–1998), amateur photographer

== Economy ==
- Tabby's Place, cat sanctuary
- Old York Cellars, winery
- Unionville Vineyards, winery
- Black River and Western Railroad, tourist and freight railroad

== Climate ==
The climate in this area is characterized by hot, humid summers and generally cold winters. According to the Köppen Climate Classification system, Ringoes has a hot-summer humid continental climate, abbreviated "Dfa" on climate maps.

== See also ==
- National Register of Historic Places listings in Hunterdon County, New Jersey
