= 2006 Wales rugby union tour of Argentina =

Series of rugby matches that took place in Argentina in 2006

- Coach: Gareth Jenkins
- Tour captain: Duncan Jones
Summary
P	W	D	L
Total
2	0	0	2
Test match
2	0	0	2
Opponent
P	W	D	L
Argentina
2	0	0	2

Tour chronology
- ← North America 2005 Australia 2007 →

In June 2006, the Wales national rugby union team travelled to Argentina for a two-test series against the Argentina national team. The first test was played on 11 June in Puerto Madryn, a city in the heart of the former Welsh colony in Patagonia, founded by Welsh settlers in 1865. The second test was played in Buenos Aires a week later. They were Wales' first matches under the management of new head coach Gareth Jenkins, who had been appointed to replace Mike Ruddock in April 2006. The test series was thrown into doubt earlier in the year after 60 Argentine players threatened to retire from international duty due to a dispute with the Argentine Rugby Union (UAR), but this was resolved at the end of May 2006. Argentina won both tests, claiming a 27–25 victory in Puerto Madryn before a more convincing 45–27 win in Buenos Aires.

== Background ==
This was Wales' fourth tour to Argentina, and the third for which they awarded caps. The first tour took place in 1968, when Argentina won the first match and drew the second. Wales won both matches in the first capped series in 1999, while the two sides won a test each in 2004.

== Squad ==
The first test was coach Gareth Jenkins' first in charge of Wales, having been appointed to the role six weeks earlier following the resignation of 2005 Grand Slam-winning coach Mike Ruddock. Jenkins named a 28-man squad for the tour on 10 May 2006. Several senior players were left out due to injury or to allow them a period of rest after the British & Irish Lions tour to New Zealand the previous summer and ahead of the 2007 Rugby World Cup the following year. Ospreys prop Duncan Jones was named as captain for the tour. Five uncapped players – Ian Evans, Richard Hibbard, James Hook, Alun Wyn Jones and Rhys M. Thomas – were included in the squad.

Ospreys centre Gavin Henson was the first to withdraw from the original squad due to fitness concerns. Although Jenkins initially said that a specialist inside centre would be called up to replace Henson, Nathan Brew of the Dragons was called up two weeks later to fill the vacant berth. Prop Gethin Jenkins and back row Dafydd Jones both withdrew with shoulder injuries before the end of May, replaced by Blues prop John Yapp and Dragons flanker Jamie Ringer respectively. Centre Hal Luscombe was the final withdrawal, having suffered a rib injury in the Dragons' Heineken Cup play-off against Overmach Parma, and replaced by Blues utility back Nick Macleod.

Name	Position	Club	Notes
Huw Bennett	Hooker	Ospreys	
Richard Hibbard	Hooker	Ospreys	
Matthew Rees	Hooker	Llanelli Scarlets	
Gethin Jenkins	Prop	Cardiff Blues	Withdrew due to injury
Adam Jones	Prop	Ospreys	
Duncan Jones (c)	Prop	Ospreys	
Rhys Thomas	Prop	Newport Gwent Dragons	
John Yapp	Prop	Cardiff Blues	Injury replacement for Gethin Jenkins
Luke Charteris	Lock	Newport Gwent Dragons	
Ian Evans	Lock	Ospreys	
Ian Gough	Lock	Newport Gwent Dragons	
Alun Wyn Jones	Lock	Ospreys	
Gareth Delve	Back row	Bath	
Dafydd Jones	Back row	Llanelli Scarlets	Withdrew due to injury
Alix Popham	Back row	Llanelli Scarlets	
Jamie Ringer	Back row	Newport Gwent Dragons	Injury replacement for Dafydd Jones
Robin Sowden-Taylor	Back row	Cardiff Blues	
Gavin Thomas	Back row	Llanelli Scarlets	
Mike Phillips	Scrum-half	Cardiff Blues	
Andy Williams	Scrum-half	Bath	
James Hook	Fly-half	Ospreys	
Nicky Robinson	Fly-half	Cardiff Blues	
Nathan Brew	Centre	Newport Gwent Dragons	Late addition
Gavin Henson	Centre	Ospreys	Withdrew due to fitness
Hal Luscombe	Centre	Newport Gwent Dragons	Withdrew due to injury
Jamie Robinson	Centre	Cardiff Blues	
Matthew Watkins	Centre	Llanelli Scarlets	
Chris Czekaj	Wing	Cardiff Blues	
Mark Jones	Wing	Llanelli Scarlets	
Shane Williams	Wing	Ospreys	
Lee Byrne	Full-back	Llanelli Scarlets	
Nick Macleod	Full-back	Cardiff Blues	Injury replacement for Hal Luscombe

== Results ==
=== First test ===
The first test was played in Puerto Madryn, a city founded by Welsh settlers in Patagonia in 1865. Despite the large Welsh-speaking population in the area, this was the Wales national team's first visit there. The game was originally scheduled for 10 June 2006, but was put back to 11 June to avoid a clash with Argentina's opening match at the 2006 FIFA World Cup against the Ivory Coast.

Ian Evans and Alun Wyn Jones started the match to earn their first caps for Wales, while Richard Hibbard and James Hook were named on the bench. Evans scored a 45-metre interception try to put Wales in front after Juan Manuel Leguizamón had controversially cancelled out Mark Jones' third-minute opening score; after Juan Martín Fernández Lobbe charged down a clearing kick from Mike Phillips, referee Alain Rolland deemed Leguizamón to have grounded the ball before it reached the dead ball line, although video replays gave evidence to the contrary. José María Núñez Piossek's try and a pair of penalties from Federico Todeschini meant the home side took a 20–12 lead into half-time, helped by the sin-binnings of Wales back-row forwards Gavin Thomas for dissent and Alix Popham for collapsing an Argentina maul. Two penalties from Nicky Robinson reduced the margin to two points, but Francisco Leonelli put Argentina 27–18 up with three minutes of the game to go. Hook scored a try in injury time, converted by Robinson, but it proved mere consolation.

11 June 2006
14:30

Argentina	27–25	Wales
Try: Leguizamón; Núñez Piossek; Leonelli; Con: Todeschini (3); Pen: Todeschini (2)	Report	Try: M. Jones; Evans; Hook; Con: N. Robinson (2); Pen: N. Robinson (2)

Estadio Raúl Conti, Puerto Madryn
Attendance: 15,000
Referee: Alain Rolland (Ireland)

FB	15	Juan Martín Hernández
RW	14	José María Núñez Piossek
OC	13	Gonzalo Tiesi		Substituted off
IC	12	Rafael Carballo
LW	11	Lucas Borges
FH	10	Federico Todeschini
SH	9	Agustín Pichot (c)
N8	8	Gonzalo Longo
OF	7	Juan Martín Fernández Lobbe
BF	6	Juan Manuel Leguizamón		Substituted off
RL	5	Rimas Álvarez Kairelis
LL	4	Ignacio Fernández Lobbe
TP	3	Martín Scelzo
HK	2	Mario Ledesma
LP	1	Rodrigo Roncero	Booked
Replacements:
HK	16	Pablo Gambarini
PR	17	Marcos Ayerza		Substituted in
LK	18	Santiago Sanz
FL	19	Martín Schusterman
SH	20	Nicolás Fernández Miranda
WG	21	Francisco Leonelli		Substituted in
FB	22	Federico Serra Miras
Coach:
Marcelo Loffreda

FB	15	Lee Byrne
RW	14	Mark Jones		Substituted off
OC	13	Jamie Robinson
IC	12	Matthew Watkins		Substituted off
LW	11	Shane Williams
FH	10	Nicky Robinson
SH	9	Mike Phillips
N8	8	Alix Popham	Booked
OF	7	Gavin Thomas	Booked
BF	6	Alun Wyn Jones		Substituted off
RL	5	Ian Evans
LL	4	Ian Gough
TP	3	Adam Jones
HK	2	Matthew Rees		Substituted off
LP	1	Duncan Jones (c)		Substituted off
Replacements:
HK	16	Richard Hibbard		Substituted in
PR	17	Rhys M. Thomas
PR	18	John Yapp		Substituted in
N8	19	Gareth Delve		Substituted in
SH	20	Andy Williams
FH	21	James Hook		Substituted in
WG	22	Chris Czekaj		Substituted in
Coach:
Gareth Jenkins

=== Second test ===
The second test was played in Buenos Aires six days later. Argentina fly-half Federico Todeschini opened the scoring with a penalty after Ian Evans was sin-binned for killing the ball. Inside centre Felipe Contepomi returned to the starting line-up after completing his medical exams in Ireland – one of three changes to the home side's starting line-up – and was involved in the first try, charging down a clearance kick from James Hook to present midfield partner Gonzalo Tiesi with a simple try. Todeschini converted the try and kicked two more penalties in the first half, while two from Hook meant Argentina led 16–6 at half-time. The home side added to their lead shortly after the break, when Juan Martín Fernández Lobbe burst through a tackle from Gavin Thomas to score a try, which Todeschini converted before kicking a further two penalties. Hook was sin-binned for a high tackle on Todeschini shortly before the hour mark, while Rhys Thomas came on for Adam Jones to make his international debut. The numbers were levelled soon after, when Martín Scelzo was yellow-carded for foul play, and Wales took advantage through Gareth Delve's first international try; however, two more Todeschini penalties sandwiched Tiesi's second try, which the fly-half also converted from out wide. Wales completed the scoring with tries from Shane Williams and Lee Byrne, while Hook and Nicky Robinson chipped in with the conversions, reducing the losing margin to 18 points. With five minutes to go, Argentina hooker Pablo Gambarini came on to make his international debut. Wales coach Gareth Jenkins blamed the loss on their inability to create a strong platform through the forwards. Despite losing the series 2–0, assistant coach Nigel Davies said the tour was a success in terms of having been able to expand the nation's player pool with five new caps. Shane Williams said the young players would have to adapt physically and improve their discipline in order to make a successful transition to the international level. Ian Evans was later cited for a late charge on Argentina captain Agustín Pichot that was not punished with a card during the game; he was banned for six weeks, beginning in August 2006, ruling him out of the Ospreys' pre-season programme and the start of the Celtic League season.

17 June 2006
15:40

Argentina	45–27	Wales
Try: Tiesi (2); J. M. Fernández Lobbe; Con: Todeschini (3); Pen: Todeschini (8)	Report	Try: Delve; S. Williams; Byrne; Con: Hook (2); N. Robinson; Pen: Hook (2)

José Amalfitani Stadium, Buenos Aires
Attendance: 18,102
Referee: Dave Pearson (England)

FB	15	Juan Martín Hernández
RW	14	Lucas Borges
OC	13	Gonzalo Tiesi
IC	12	Felipe Contepomi		(substituted off) 73'
LW	11	Francisco Leonelli		(substituted off) 75'
FH	10	Federico Todeschini
SH	9	Agustín Pichot (c)		(substituted off) 70'
N8	8	Gonzalo Longo
OF	7	Juan Martín Fernández Lobbe
BF	6	Martín Durand		(substituted off) 55'
RL	5	Rimas Álvarez Kairelis
LL	4	Ignacio Fernández Lobbe		(substituted off) 64'
TP	3	Martín Scelzo	(yellow card) 57'
HK	2	Mario Ledesma		(substituted off) 75'
LP	1	Rodrigo Roncero		(substituted off) 73'
Replacements:
HK	16	Pablo Gambarini		(substituted in) 75'
PR	17	Marcos Ayerza		(substituted in) 73'
LK	18	Manuel Carizza		(substituted in) 64'
FL	19	Martín Schusterman		(substituted in) 55'
SH	20	Nicolás Fernández Miranda		(substituted in) 70'
WG	21	José María Núñez Piossek		(substituted in) 75'
FB	22	Federico Serra Miras		(substituted in) 73'
Coach:
Marcelo Loffreda

FB	15	Lee Byrne
RW	14	Mark Jones
OC	13	Jamie Robinson		(substituted off) 34'
IC	12	James Hook	(yellow card) 55'
LW	11	Shane Williams
FH	10	Nicky Robinson
SH	9	Mike Phillips		(substituted off) 67'
N8	8	Alix Popham		(substituted off) 41'
OF	7	Gavin Thomas
BF	6	Alun Wyn Jones
RL	5	Ian Evans	(yellow card) 18'
LL	4	Ian Gough
TP	3	Adam Jones		(substituted off) 57'
HK	2	Huw Bennett		(substituted off) 67'
LP	1	Duncan Jones (c)
Replacements:
HK	16	Richard Hibbard		(substituted in) 67'
PR	17	Rhys M. Thomas		(substituted in) 57'
PR	18	John Yapp
N8	19	Gareth Delve		(substituted in) 41'
SH	20	Andy Williams		(substituted in) 67'
CE	21	Nathan Brew
CE	22	Matthew Watkins		(substituted in) 34'
Coach:
Gareth Jenkins
