= Old York =

Old York may refer to:

- York, England, United Kingdom
- York, Ontario, Canada, dissolved municipality now part of Toronto
- York, Upper Canada, the name of Old Toronto in Canada between 1793 and 1834
- Old York Cellars, a winery in New Jersey
- Old York Road, built in the 18th century to connect Philadelphia, Pennsylvania with New York City
