= Tabby's Place =

Cat sanctuary in New Jersey, United States

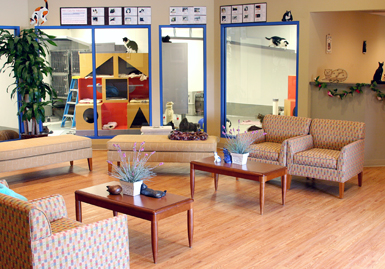
The Tabby's Place Lobby, showing the cageless sanctuary

Tabby's Place is a cat sanctuary located in Ringoes, New Jersey, United States. Opened in 2003, it can house over 100 cats at any given time. Residents primarily come from other animal shelters and in cooperation with local animal control.

== History ==
The inception of Tabby's Place began when a stray brown tabby cat, named Tabby, was adopted by Jonathan Rosenberg, then Chief Technology Officer at CNET, and his wife Sharon. Upon learning that Tabby was terminally ill, Jonathan resigned from his job and founded the 501(c)(3) non-profit corporation called Tabby's Place: A Cat Sanctuary. The sanctuary opened its doors in 2003, with the mission of saving cats from hopeless situations.

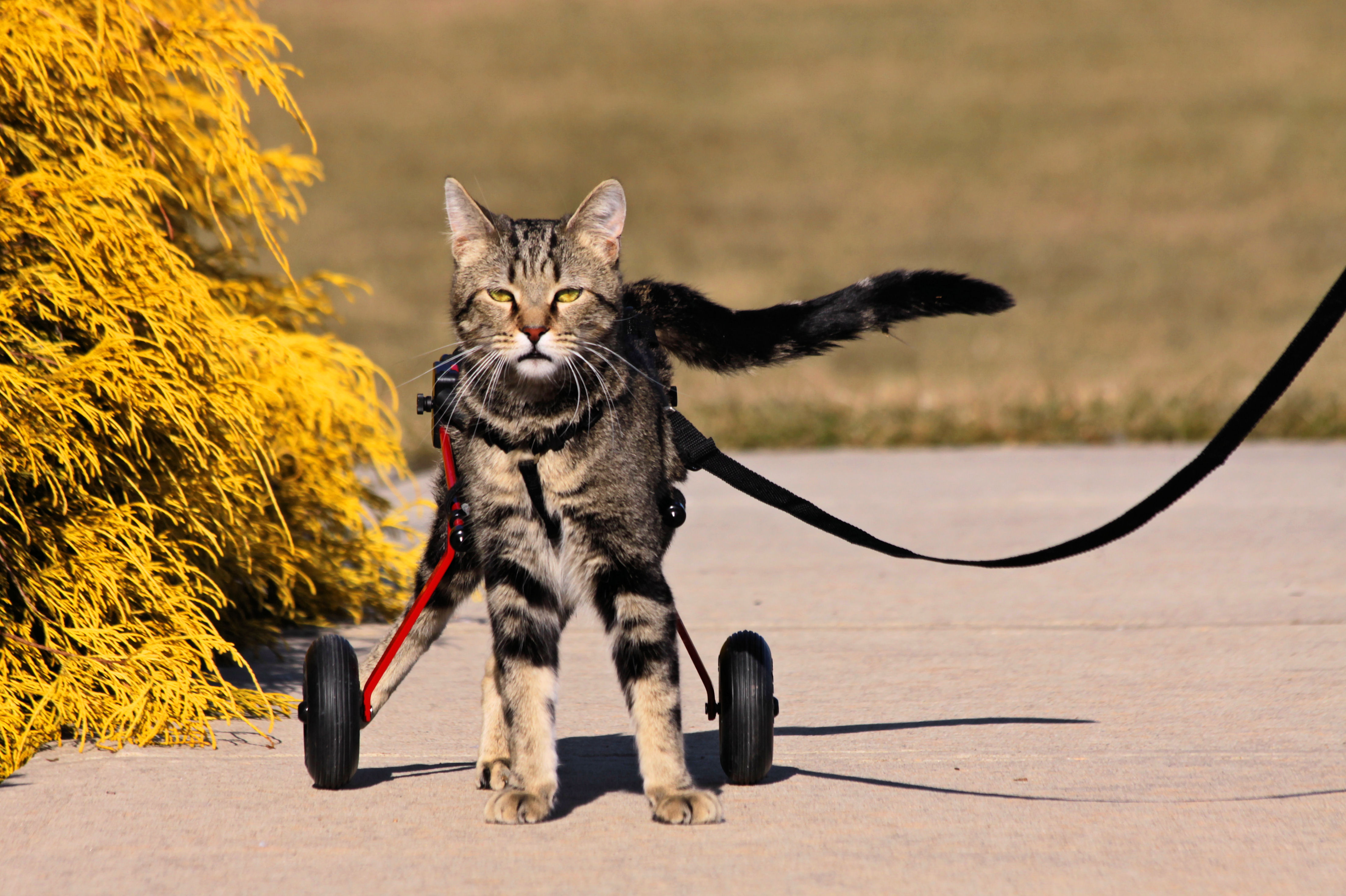
Tashi, a paraplegic resident of Tabby's Place

In June 2010, a USA Today article described a United States Marine stationed in Okinawa, Japan, who had been caring for three stray cats when his local animal shelter was being shut down. The cats were scheduled to be euthanized, but the Marine requested help from the Okinawan American Animal Rescue Society, which arranged for the cats' journey from Okinawa to Tabby's Place. The transfer, which occurred in April 2010, was Tabby's Place's first international rescue. While the vast majority of the sanctuary’s cats come from the United States, under five percent a year come through international rescue organizations representing countries that include Turkey, Lebanon, and Oman.

In 2023, Tabby's Place marked three significant milestones, celebrating their 20th anniversary, the arrival of their 4,000th resident, and the grand opening of Quinn's Corner, an expansion designed to accommodate cats infected with feline leukemia virus (FeLV).

Jonathan Rosenberg continues to serve as executive director, assisted by a small professional staff as well as over 350 active volunteers.

== Facility and services ==
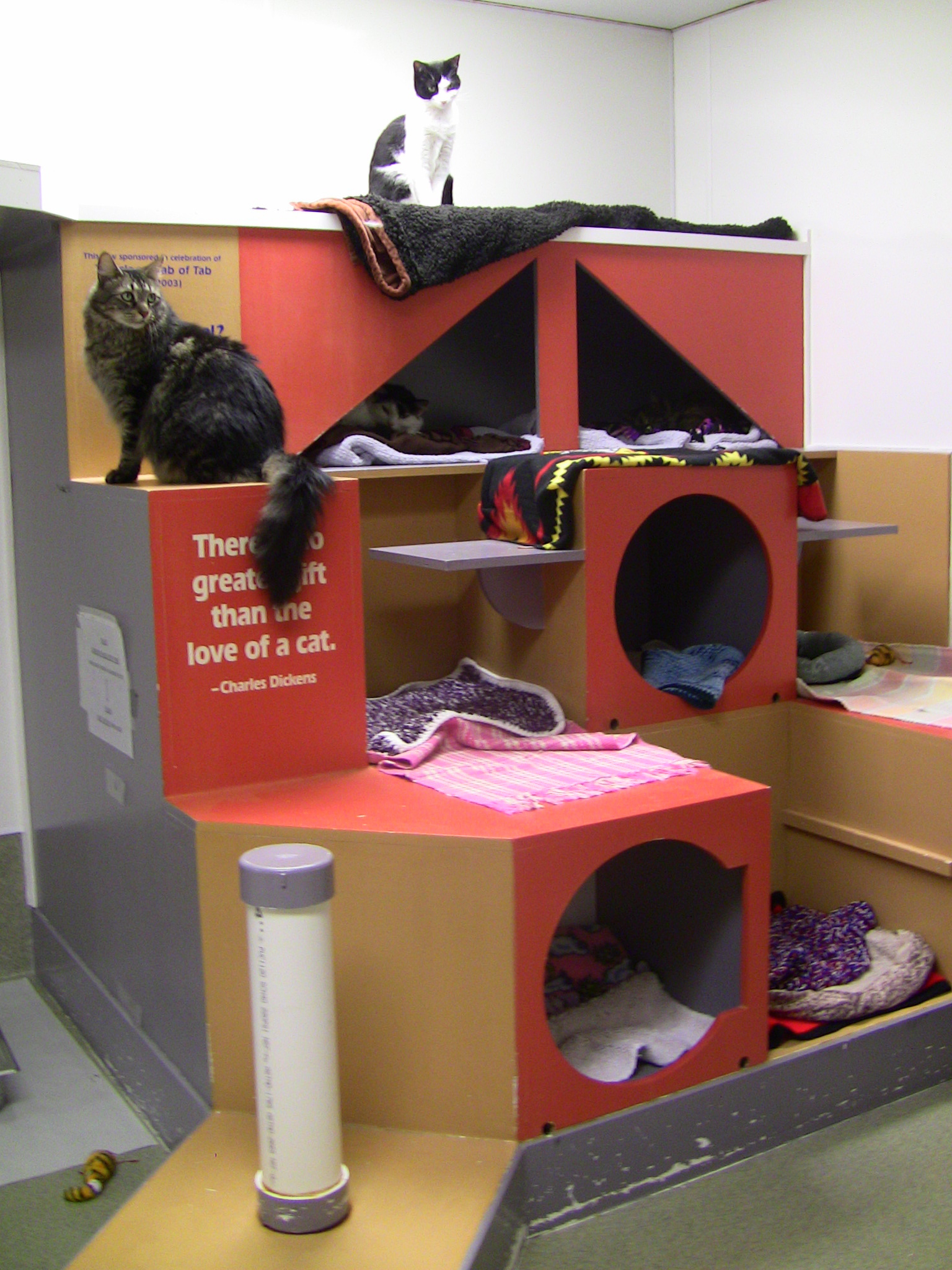
Three cats in Suite B

Tabby's Place is a cage free sanctuary with communal living areas, specialized suites for cats with specific medical needs, enclosed outdoor solariums, and an in-house medical facility. The building was designed to accommodate cats with a range of physical and medical needs and constructed of materials that allow for easy and frequent cleaning. The physical design of Tabby's Place and attention to detail has received considerable media coverage. New Jersey Monthly described the sanctuary as "palatial."

In October 2023, Tabby's Place opened Quinn's Corner, its first expansion. The wing provides dedicated housing for cats infected with the feline leukemia virus (FeLV), enabling the sanctuary to care for them separately from its general population.

The sanctuary operates as both a long-term home and an adoption center, with on-site medical and behavioral care for its resident cats. Its in-house medical team provides routine and ongoing veterinary care, while cases requiring specialized treatment are referred to outside veterinary providers. Cats with behavioral or neurological needs receive individualized enrichment plans to support their well-being, and adopters can receive ongoing support after placement.

Cats are accepted regardless of age or medical condition, including those that may be considered difficult to place in traditional shelters. The sanctuary cares for many cats with special needs such as diabetes, feline immunodeficiency virus (FIV), neurological disabilities, cancer, blindness and paraplegia. Its specialized facilities and care programs are intended to support these cats while they await adoption, and cats that are not adopted will remain at the sanctuary for life.

Tabby's Place also operates community outreach programs. Paws to Read is a bimonthly literacy program in which children read aloud to cats at the sanctuary. The program has also expanded to include reading events at local libraries. Through Aged to Purrfection, volunteers bring certified therapy cats to visit residents of senior living and rehabilitation facilities.

== Media coverage ==
Tabby's Place: a Cat Sanctuary has been featured on the Animal Planet's series Cats 101. In 2008, Tabby's Place garnered the attention of national and local media thanks to a paraplegic resident, Tashi who was rescued in partnership with, Best Friends Animal Society. Tashi's story was featured in the Courier News in 2009. Tabby's Place was featured on the CBS Evening News with Katie Couric and WWOR-TV.

== Recognition ==
The Rosenbergs' work has been recognized by the New Jersey Veterinary Medical Association, which awarded Jonathan the 2005 New Jersey Veterinary Foundation Award, and the Supreme Master Ching Hai International Association awarded Jonathan and Sharon the Shining World Hero Award in 2009.

The "SuperCats" of Tabby's Place were collectively nominated by the sanctuary's volunteers and won the New Jersey Veterinary Medical Association's 2011 Animal Hall of Fame Award.
