= Dead Ringer =

Dead Ringer or Dead Ringers may refer to:

- Dead ringer (idiom)

== Books ==
- The Dead Ringer, a 1948 mystery novel by Fredric Brown
- Dead Ringer, novel in the Rosato & Associates series

== Radio, film and television ==
=== Films ===
- Dead Ringer (film), a 1964 film starring Bette Davis, Peter Lawford, and Karl Malden
- Dead Ringer, a 1982 film directed by Allan F. Nicholls
- Dead Ringers (film), a 1988 film directed by David Cronenberg
- Dead Ringers: The Making of Touch of Grey, a 1987 music documentary film about the American rock group the Grateful Dead

=== Television episodes ===
- "A Dead Ringer", Studio One season 10, episode 23 (1958)
- "Dead Ringer", A Scare at Bedtime series 5, episode 19 (2002)
- "Dead Ringer", Alcoa Presents One Step Beyond season 2, episode 11 (1959)
- "Dead Ringer", Blue Heelers season 2, episode 15 (1995)
- "Dead Ringer", CSI: Crime Scene Investigation season 4, episode 20 (2004)
- "Dead Ringer", CSI: Miami season 10, episode 8 (2011)
- "Dead Ringer", Ghost Whisperer season 5, episode 21 (2010)
- "Dead Ringer", Guidance season 3, episode 6 (2017)
- "Dead Ringer", Hawaiian Eye season 1, episode 31 (1960)
- "Dead Ringer", Heartbeat season 3, episode 3 (1993)
- "Dead Ringer", Highlander: The Animated Series season 2, episode 7 (1995)
- "Dead Ringer", Magnum P.I. (2018) season 5, episode 6 (2023)
- "Dead Ringer", Night Heat season 2, episode 2 (1986)
- "Dead Ringer", Scarecrow and Mrs. King season 1, episode 14 (1984)
- "Dead Ringer", So Weird season 3, episode 24 (2001)
- "Dead Ringer", Taggart series 1, episode 1 (1985)
- "Dead Ringer", The Fall Guy season 5, episode 1 (1985)
- "Dead Ringer", The Six Million Dollar Man season 5 episode 19 (1978)
- "Dead Ringer", The Weekenders season 1, episode 8a (2000)
- "Dead Ringer", The Young Riders season 2, episode 3 (1990)
- "Dead Ringer", Vegas (1978) season 3, episode 20 (1981)
- "Dead Ringer", Victor and Valentino season 1, episode 2 (2019)
- "Dead Ringers", Martial Law season 1, episode 3 (1998)
- "Dead Ringers", Pacific Blue season 5, episode 7 (1999)
- "Dead Ringers", The New Adventures of Batman episode 11 (1977)
- "The Dead Ringer", The Restless Gun season 2, episode 20 (1959)
- "The Dead Ringers", Batman season 2, episode 16 (1966)

=== Television shows ===
- Dead Ringers (miniseries), a 2023 television miniseries based on the 1988 film
- Dead Ringers (series), a British radio and television show

== Music ==
- Dead Ringer (album), a 1981 album by Meat Loaf
- Deadringer (album), a 2002 album by RJD2
- "Dead Ringer", a song by The Stranglers off their album No More Heroes
- "Deadringer", a song by Knocked Loose, off their album Laughing Tracks
- "Dead Ringer", a 64k demo by Fairlight released at Assembly in 2006

== See also ==
- "Deadly Ringer", a 1977 episode of The Bionic Woman
- Dead bell, a hand bell used in conjunction with deaths
- Ringer (disambiguation)
