= Stanwell School =

Coordinates: 51°25′59.96″N 03°10′58.57″W

Stanwell School, Penarth

Location
- Archer Road; Penarth, Vale of Glamorgan, CF64 2XL; Wales

Information
- Type: Foundation status Comprehensive
- Motto: Goreu arf, arf dysg (Knowledge the best weapon)
- Established: 1897; 129 years ago
- Founder: Sir Robert Windsor-Clive, Earl of Plymouth
- Local authority: Vale of Glamorgan
- Specialist: Sixth Form College
- Department for Education URN: 401804 Tables
- Headteacher: James Mansfield
- Staff: 96
- Gender: Co-educational
- Age: 11 to 18
- Enrolment: 2,000
- Houses: Morgannwg, Dyfed, Gwent, Powys, Gwynedd
- Colours: Navy Blue, Gold
- Website: www.stanwell.org

Stanwell School is a co-educational foundation status comprehensive school and Sixth form college located in Penarth, Vale of Glamorgan, Wales, for children aged between eleven and eighteen. The school is in the town of Penarth, 5 mi (8.0 km) south-west from Cardiff.

The school has approximately 2,000 pupils on the roll in years seven to thirteen, including the sixth form.

Specialist teaching accommodation has been provided for science (eleven laboratories), drama, music, media studies, P.E. (including sports halls and playing fields), Information Technology, Art and Design Technology.

Stanwell School was previously Penarth County Grammar School prior to becoming a comprehensive school.

== History ==
=== A Victorian beginning ===
The school originally opened in 1897 as Penarth Grammar School and was founded by Joe Carolan during the rapid Victorian expansion of the Penarth, Cogan, Llandough and Dinas Powys areas following the building of Cardiff and Penarth docks to handle the burgeoning South Wales coal trade. Between 1891 and 1901 the population of the town expanded from 12,000 to over 15,000 people and the need for a new school was paramount.

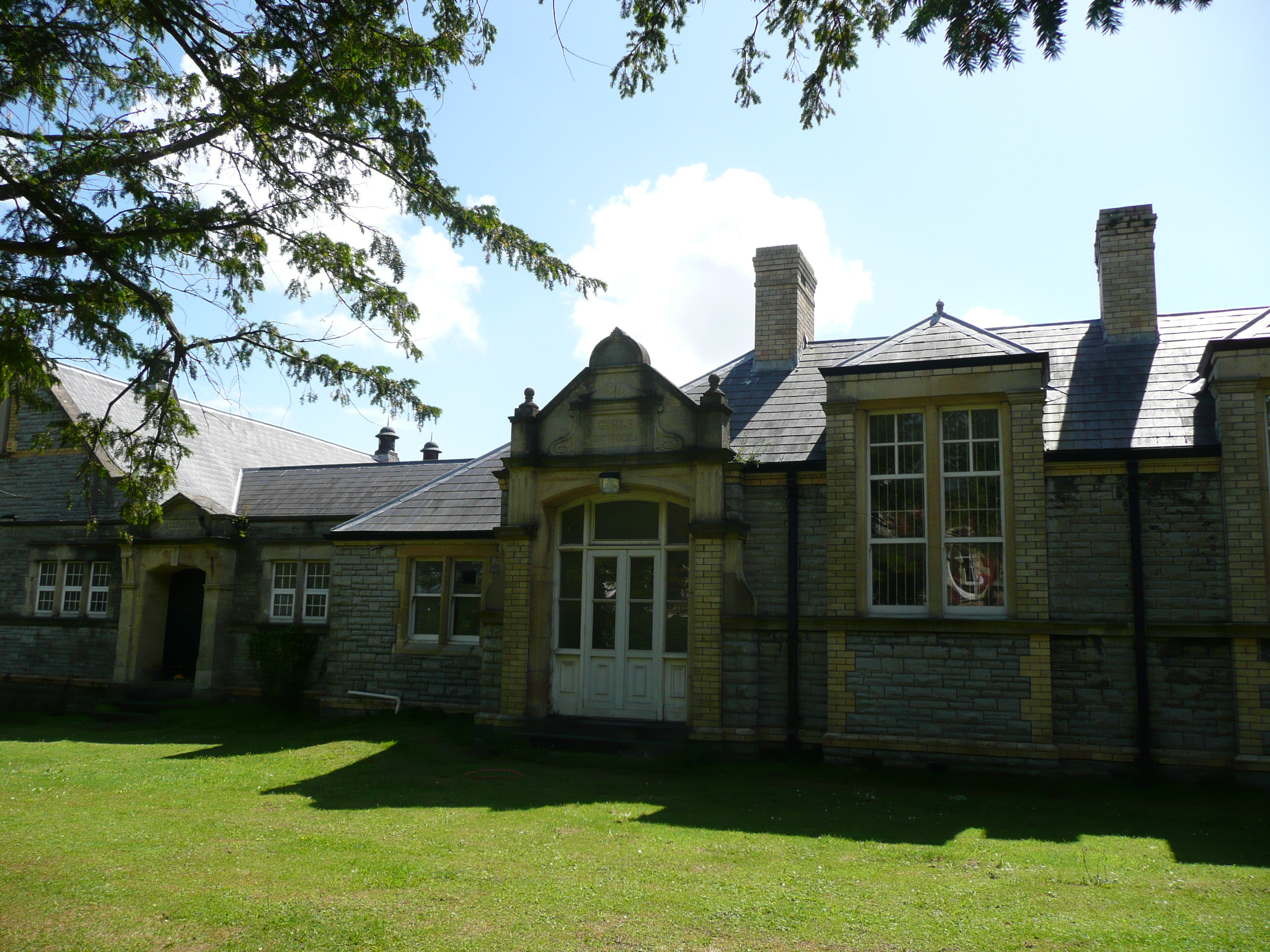
The now disused former girls entrance, to the original school building. The tall window to the right gave light to the school's main assembly hall

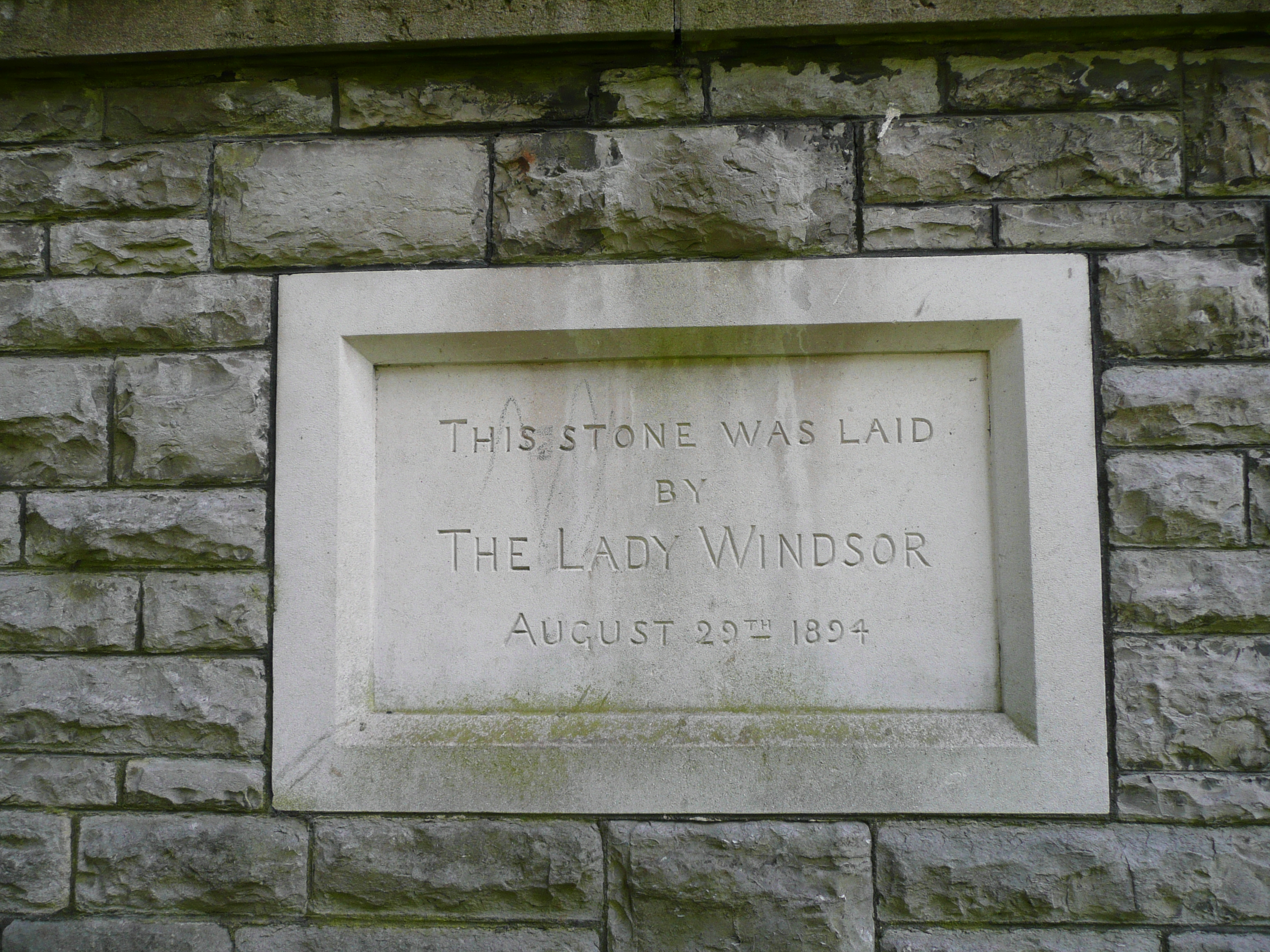
School foundation stone, laid in 1894 by the founder's wife, the Baroness Windsor

The school was established for both boys and girls at a time when most British grammar schools were single sex establishments and few girls were even expected to complete a grammar school education. However, within the school the sexes remained segregated during the working day with separate school entrances, classrooms, teaching staff and playground areas. The girls' curriculum included only reading, writing, arithmetic and sewing, but the boys instead studied the sciences, Latin and ancient Greek. All children left school at the age of fourteen until the educational reforms introduced by the Conservative government's Education Board President Rab Butler in his Education Act 1944.

Initially the only building on the site was the original school building that still stands, facing onto Archer Road, the headmaster's private residence on the corner of Archer and Stanwell roads (later used as a home by the resident caretaker) and a small chapel building that was later converted into a physics laboratory during the 1940s.

In the early years the school roll was bolstered by the children from Radyr, Morganstown, Whitchurch and Rhiwbina where there was no secondary school. The nine mile steam train journey to Penarth Grammar and St Cyres Secondary Modern was easier and quicker than the road journey to any closer Cardiff schools. Penarth served the County of Glamorgan, whereas Cardiff schools only served those within the city limits. The situation only changed in 1968 when Radyr's own secondary school was built and the direct rail link was removed by the Beeching Axe. With the introduction of comprehensive schools, there was no further need to travel outside Cardiff to the County Grammar School.

During the second world war, the school took in evacuees from other parts of the UK. Pupils from Whitchurch continued to travel from Cardiff despite air raids and bombing. There was also a barrage balloon unit posted on the playing field, and pupils were allocated local houses to run to in the event of an air raid.

=== 20th century ===
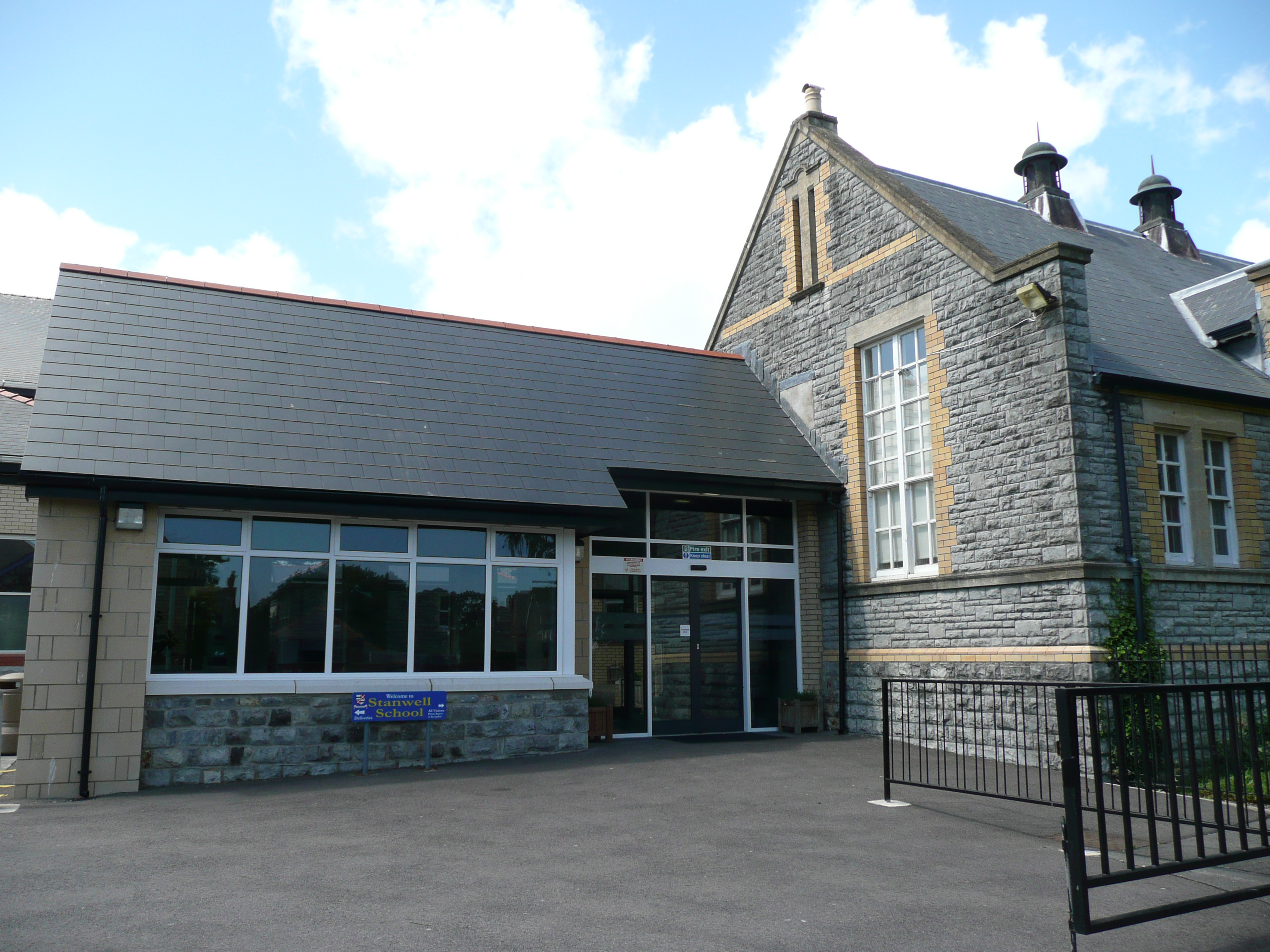
The main entrance

Penarth's town rugby pitch had been dug up and used for growing vegetables by local residents during First World War food shortages, so between 1919 and 1924 the traditional annual Good Friday rugby matches between Penarth RFC and the Barbarians were staged instead on the grammar school's playing field, when most of the town's population turned up to watch and cheer. In the autumn of 1924 the new Athletic Ground on Lavernock Road, a gift to the town by the Earl of Plymouth, was opened and the Good Friday matches were moved to their new home the following year.

In 1960 the previously segregated sexes were combined into a co-educational school that was renamed as Penarth County Grammar School but the increasing school population had far expanded beyond the available accommodation and a large number of temporary portakabin buildings were added and increasingly built across the original playgrounds and playing fields. These temporary buildings included a gymnasium (1955), chemistry and biology(1952) laboratories, domestic science (now food technology) kitchen, woodwork and metalwork shops, several ranges of classrooms and a toilet block. Originally planned to last no longer than ten years, many of the temporary buildings remained in use well into the 1980s and 1990s.

In 1971 the local authority funded the building of a new youth club on the school site, near the Stanwell Road side entrance, called Penarth Youth Wing and the facility was utilised by the school during the day as additional accommodation for music and drama classes.

=== Developments ===
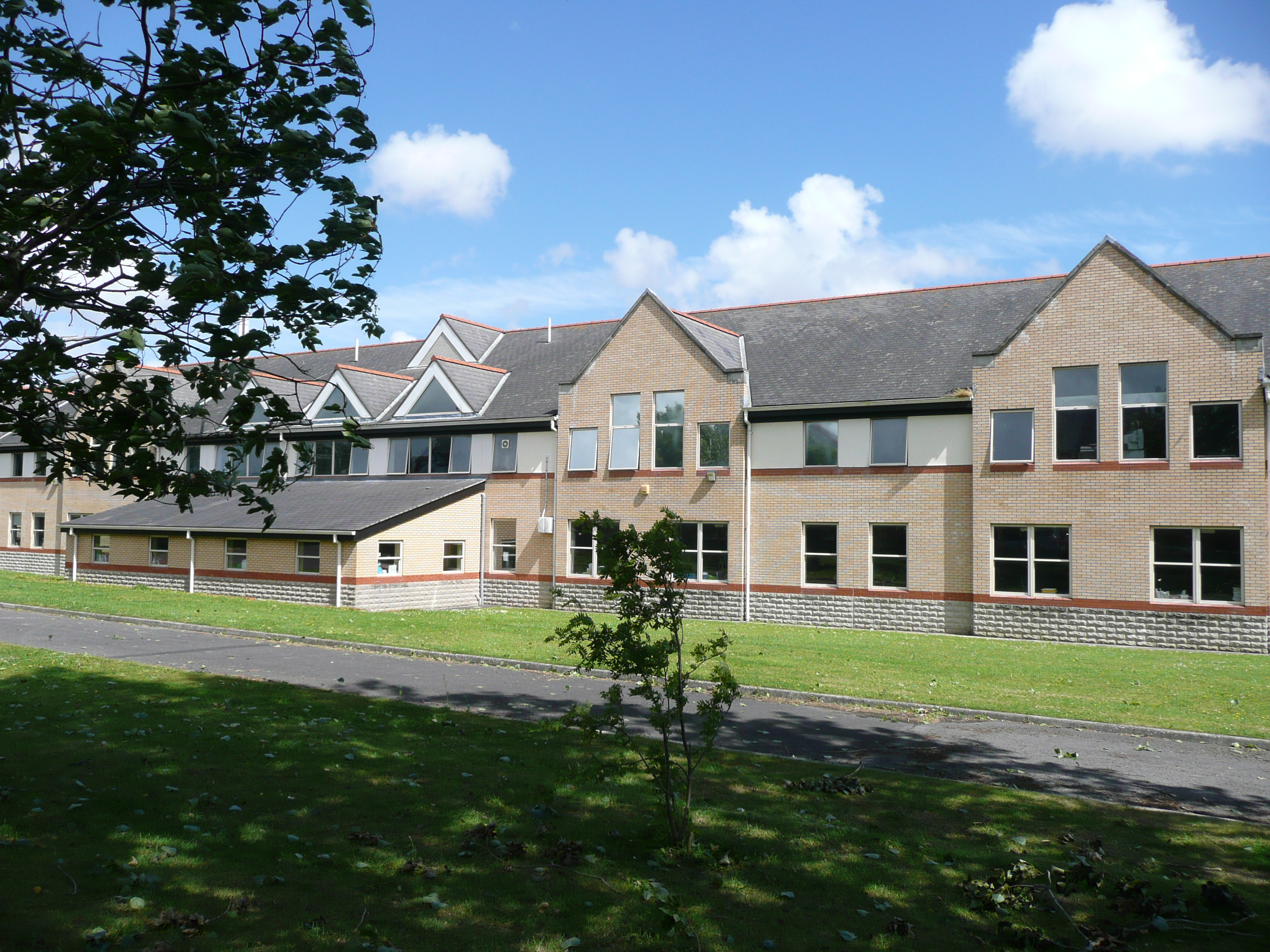
A small section of the 1990s additions

Entry to the school in the early years had been by 11-plus examination. However, in the late 1960s a Labour government led educational reform, through several ministerial directives and eventually the Education Reform Act 1968, that was accepted and implemented by the education authority, scrapped the Eleven-Plus examination and with it the segregated tripartite strata of grammar, technical grammar and secondary modern schools. In 1970 the school became a co-educational comprehensive and renamed as Stanwell Comprehensive School.

Between 1990 and 1998 Stanwell was a grant maintained school operating under direct government funding and effecting its own student selection process, outside the normal procedures of the local education authority. It was during this period of grant maintained status that investment was made into providing new school buildings.

The grant maintained system ceased in 1998 under the new Labour government and, renamed again as Stanwell School, it now has foundation status within the education authority but with autonomous school governors controlling admissions to the school, employing the school's staff and owning the school's estate.

==== Performing Arts ====
In recent years the school has hosted several dramatic and musical presentations including Jesus Christ Superstar, Alice in Wonderland and Cabaret. The school was the first in Europe to perform the School Edition of Les Misérables in 2002, and the first in the UK to perform The Phantom of the Opera in December 2011, in celebration of the musical's 25th anniversary.

The theatre and auditorium is equipped with a range of musical instruments. The latest lighting systems are installed in the auditorium and other performance areas. The Drama department also took part in the Royal National Theatre Youth Connection where pupils in years 10-13 performed a newly commissioned production entitled Success by playwright Nick Drake at the school, followed by a performance at the Wales Millennium Centre on 9 April 2009. Other schools also perform in Stanwell's auditorium.

== The school today ==
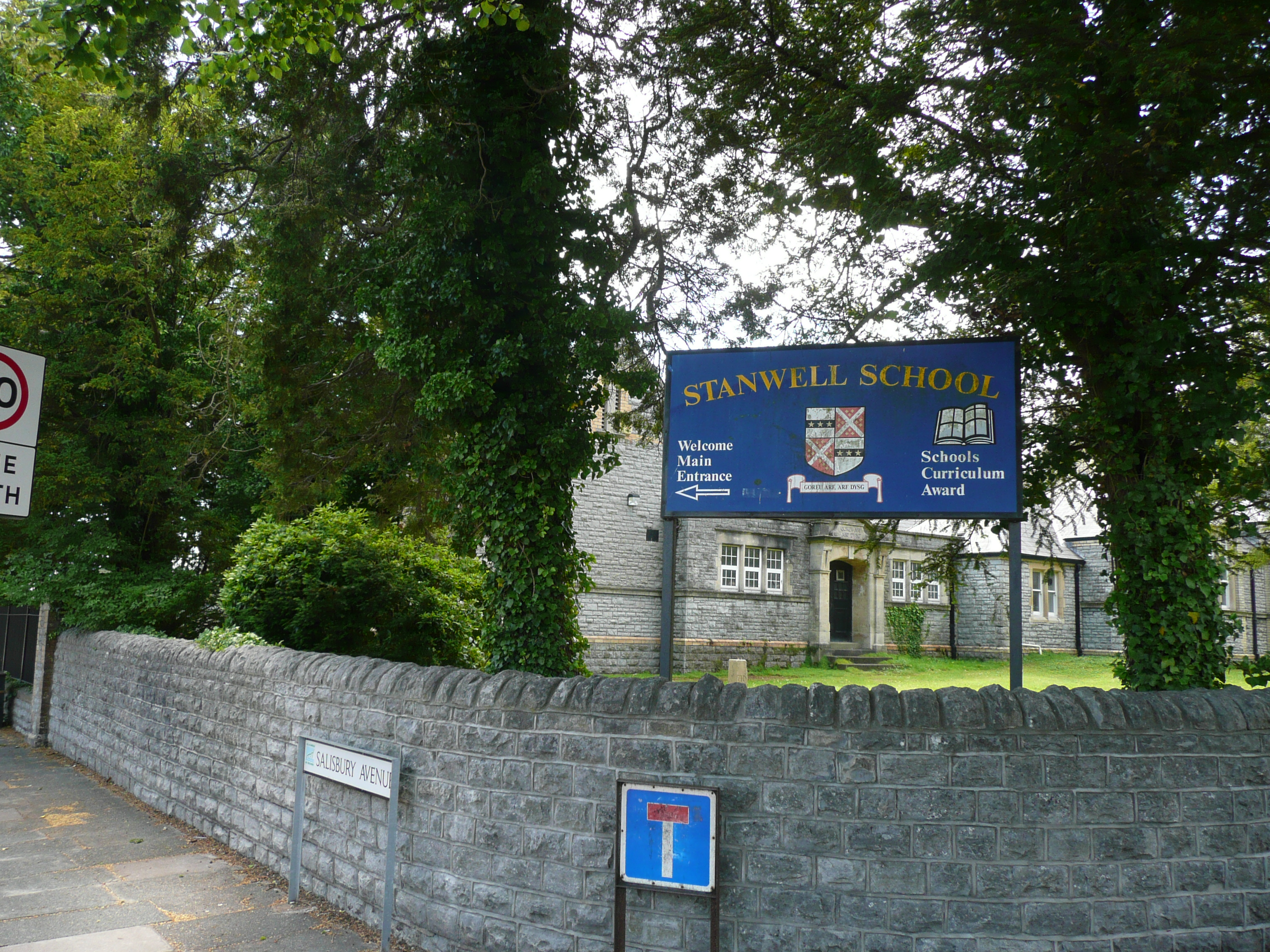
School sign on the corner of Archer Road

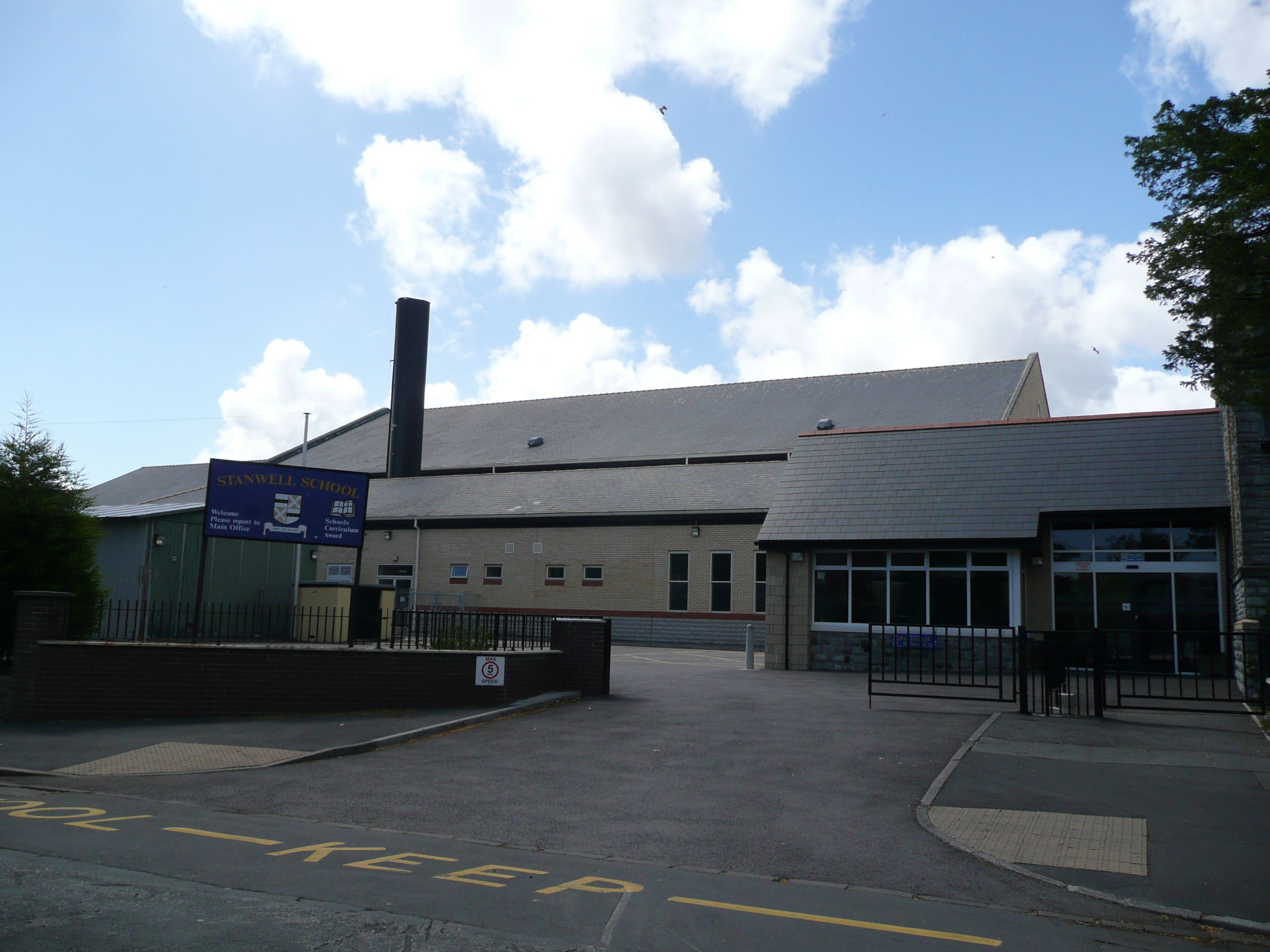
Salisbury Avenue entrance gates, the roof of the main hall and auditorium can be seen in the background

=== Catchment ===
Most pupils transfer at age eleven from one of the four main partner primary schools: Albert Road Primary, Evenlode Primary, Victoria Primary and Sully Primary. Buses transport pupils from Sully. Pupils are drawn from the full range of abilities.

=== Results ===
Stanwell's 2008 A level results broke previous school records with 22 students achieving four A grades or better, with the top nine students achieving five grade As or better. One quarter of Stanwell pupils achieved three A grades or better, with the average points score per pupil exceeding three A grades (81 points per student).

=== Inspections ===
As of 2021, the school was last inspected by Estyn in 2015, and judged Excellent.

=== Sixth Form ===
At sixteen years of age, most pupils choose to remain at the school to continue with their studies in the sixth form. Stanwell has over 400 6th form students, over 95% of whom also studied GCSEs at the school. To be eligible for 6th form, a student must have achieved at least 5 A*-C grades at GCSE. The school has undergone building work to create a (approximately) 15x20m 'study area' for the upper-sixth form.

== School badge ==
The school badge represents the coat of arms of Robert Windsor-Clive, 1st Earl of Plymouth.

== Notable former pupils ==
=== Penarth County Grammar School ===
- Sir Archibald Rowlands GCB MBE (26 December 1892 – 18 August 1953), British civil servant, Permanent Secretary to the Ministry of Air Production during the Second World War
- Denys Graham (born 1945), actor
- Richard William Leslie Wain VC (1896 – 1917) – Captain in the Tank Corps and recipient of the Victoria Cross
- Samuel George Pearse VC, MM, (1897 – 1919) – Sergeant in the Royal Fusiliers and recipient of the Victoria Cross
- Sir Henry Lewis Guy CBE, FRS, (1887 – 1956), a leading British mechanical engineer
- John Smith MP (born 1951) – Labour party politician and former Member of Parliament for the Vale of Glamorgan
- Colin McCormack (1941 – 2004), actor
- Peter Philp (1920 – 2006) – a Welsh dramatist and antiques expert, best known for his television series, Collectors' Club

=== Stanwell School ===
- Joel Bennett Ringer (born 1996), Welsh professional rugby union player
- Polly James (born 1986), Welsh television and radio presenter
- Jemma Griffiths (born 1975), Welsh singer-songwriter better known as Jem
- Lewis Vaughan Jones (born 1981), Welsh journalist and news television presenter
- Ieuan Lloyd (born 1993), Welsh swimmer
- Ronan Vibert (born 1964), English actor

== See also ==
- Stanwell School Website
