= Wringer (disambiguation) =

A wringer is a mechanical laundry aid (also known as a mangle).

Wringer may also refer to:

- Wringer (magic trick), a stage magic trick
- Wringer (novel), a Newbery Honor–winning 1998 novel
- Wringer bucket, a device for squeezing out a wet mop
- "Stuck in the Wringer", a SpongeBob SquarePants (season 7) episode

== See also ==
- Ringer (disambiguation)
