= The Ringer =

The Ringer may refer to:

== Film, theatre, and television ==
- The Ringer (novel) (originally titled The Gaunt Stranger), a 1925/1926 novel by Edgar Wallace
  - Adaptations of The Ringer:
  - The Ringer, a 1929 play by Edgar Wallace
  - The Ringer (1928 film), a British crime film directed by Arthur Maude
  - The Ringer (1931 film), a British crime film directed by Walter Forde
  - The Ringer (1932 film), an Austrian-German mystery film by Martin Frič and Karel Lamač
  - The Ringer (1952 film), a British mystery directed by Guy Hamilton
  - The Ringer aka Der Hexer (1964 film), a German crime film
- The Ringer, a 1972 short film by Jeff Lieberman
- The Ringer (2005 film), a 2005 comedy starring Johnny Knoxville
- The Ringer (2013 film), a drama written and directed by Chris Shepherd for Canal+ and CNC
- "The Ringer", an episode of the TV series The Legend of Zelda

== Music ==
- The Ringers, an American rock band
- The Ringer (album), a jazz music album by Charles Tolliver, or the title track
- "The Ringer" (song), by Eminem from Kamikaze

== Places ==
- The Ringer (Antarctica), a distinctive ring-shaped moraine at the mouth of Ringer Glacier

== Publications ==
- The Ringer (website), a sports and pop culture website

== See also ==
- Ringer (disambiguation)
- The Sorcerer (1932 film) (originally Der Hexer), 1932 Austrian-German film based on the Edgar Wallace novel The Ringer
