= Alix Popham =

Welsh rugby player (born 1979)

- Born: Alix Jon Popham; 17 October 1979 (age 47) Newport, Wales
- Height: 1.91 m (6 ft 3 in)
- Weight: 108 kg (17 st 0 lb)
- School: Bassaleg School

Rugby union career
- Position(s): Number eight, flanker
Senior career
Years	Team	Apps	(Points)
1998–2002	Newport	98	
2002–2005	Leeds Tykes	62	
2005–2008	Llanelli Scarlets	68	
2008–2011	Brive	78	
International career
Years	Team	Apps	(Points)
- Wales U21 22
- Wales A 6
2003–2008	Wales	33	(20)

Alix Jon Popham (born 17 October 1979) is a Welsh former rugby union player who played as a number eight or flanker. Born in Newport, he began his career with Newport RFC in 1998, before moving to Leeds Tykes in 2002. He spent three years in England before returning to Wales with the Llanelli Scarlets in 2005. In 2008, he moved to France to play for Brive and was made captain ahead of the 2009–10 season. He retired due to injury at the end of the 2010–11 season, having made over 360 appearances in 13 years as a professional. He also played internationally for the Wales national team, earning 33 caps.

== Career ==
=== Club career ===
Born in Newport, Popham began his career with Newport RFC. He played for them 89 times between 1998 and 2002, when he signed for Leeds Tykes. After an initial, six-week loan spell during the 2001–02 season, Popham joined Leeds permanently in October 2002 after activating a clause in his contract that allowed him to leave Newport if they signed an international back-row forward, which they did in the form of Steve Ojomoh. Although Newport could have held onto Popham until December 2002, they elected to let him leave early after not registering him to play in the Parker Pen Challenge Cup. At the end of the season, Leeds qualified for the wildcard playoffs for the final English place in the Heineken Cup; despite Popham scoring a try in the second leg to give Leeds a 27–13 win, they lost 70–48 on aggregate. In April 2004, Popham signed a new, two-year contract with Leeds amid interest from Welsh clubs about a return to Wales. The following season, he helped them win the 2004–05 Powergen Cup, starting in the 20–12 win over Bath in the final.

In the summer of 2005, Popham returned to Wales, signing for the Scarlets as a replacement for the retiring Scott Quinnell after being released from his Leeds contract early. He played in 24 of the Scarlets' first 26 games of the season before suffering an injury early in the 36–17 win over the Dragons on 22 April that saw him miss the next two matches. He scored his first try for the Scarlets in their 15–13 win over Edinburgh Gunners in the Heineken Cup. His second Scarlets try came in the return fixture against Edinburgh, but it was not enough to prevent a 33–32 defeat that eliminated the Scarlets from the competition. In February 2006, the Scarlets appealed to the Welsh Rugby Union (WRU) for the release of some of their key players, including Popham, from the Wales squad involved in the 2006 Six Nations for their Anglo-Welsh Cup semi-final tie with Bath on 4 March. The Scarlets won 27–26 at the Millennium Stadium, with Popham giving a man-of-the-match performance to reach his second straight Powergen Cup final. Less than a minute into the final, Popham collided with Wasps flanker Johnny O'Connor, who was knocked out and had to be stretchered off, having suffered a spinal concussion. Despite Wasps having to make an early change and also being temporarily reduced to 14 men during the first half, the Scarlets lost the match 26–10. On 9 May 2006, Popham scored both of the Scarlets' tries in an 18–6 win over Munster. The following weekend, he was sent off in the Scarlets' 17–10 loss to Glasgow Warriors; after initially being sin-binned for a high tackle in the first half, he received a second yellow card for his reaction to a decision by referee George Clancy, ruling him out of the Scarlets' final game of the season and putting his eligibility for Wales' tour to Argentina in doubt. Before the end of his first season there, Popham signed a contract extension with the Scarlets, keeping him at the region until the end of the 2008–09 season.

Popham began the 2006–07 season on the bench for the Scarlets, at the request of the WRU, but soon returned to the starting line-up despite competition from Nathan Thomas, signed in the summer from Popham's former club, Leeds. Popham's involvement in the Wales squad saw him miss the Scarlets' games during the Autumn internationals and the Six Nations, but he was their first-choice number 8 when available, though he was rested for the 29–10 loss against the Cardiff Blues on New Year's Day due to the congested fixture schedule. He played in all six of the Scarlets' Heineken Cup pool matches, scoring the first of their five tries in the penultimate game against Ulster on 13 January. They won all six pool matches to qualify for the quarter-finals, where they beat Munster 24–15, before losing 33–17 to Leicester Tigers in the semi-finals.

Due to his involvement with Wales at the 2007 Rugby World Cup, Popham missed the start of the 2007–08 season with the Scarlets. He made his first appearance of the season off the bench in an 18–11 loss to Bristol in the Anglo-Welsh Cup. He returned to the starting line-up in the next game at home to former club Leeds, scoring the Scarlets' fourth try in a 59–19 win before being substituted at half-time. He missed the league defeat to Edinburgh on 25 November as he was on Wales duty for their test against South Africa, but again returned to the bench for the 36–32 win over Saracens the following week, albeit as an unused substitute. He came on for Dafydd Jones in the second half of a 29–16 home defeat to Munster in the Heineken Cup on 8 December, before returning to the starting line-up for the return match on 16 December. He committed a pair of high tackles in the game and was sin-binned for the second as the Scarlets lost 22–13 and had their hopes of qualifying for the quarter-finals extinguished. He had to be substituted after half an hour of the next game, a 17–12 win over the Ospreys, and ended up missing the next three games. He returned for the final Heineken Cup pool match at home to Clermont on 15 January 2008, coming on for Dafydd Jones at half-time in the 41–0 loss. He missed the game against Glasgow due to his involvement in the 2008 Six Nations, but was granted leave from Wales duty for the Scarlets' away game against Ulster on 29 February. He again came off the bench for the second half, but could not prevent a 20–8 loss. He returned to the starting line-up for the next three games, picking up a yellow card in the last of them, a 35–26 away defeat to the Blues. He was dropped to the bench for the next game, a 25–23 away defeat to Glasgow, coming on for Nathan Thomas in the 57th minute. That proved to be Popham's last game for the Scarlets; having been linked with a move to Brive in March 2008, the French club agreed to pay the Scarlets a six-figure transfer fee to release him from his contract early, once the Scarlets had signed Popham's replacement in the form of former Australia international David Lyons.

The 2009–10 season, Popham played twice against his former club in the Heineken Cup, having been drawn in the same pool, although he went off with an elbow injury after half an hour of the first match on 10 October 2009. After the 2010–11 season, Popham had intended to return to Wales, but after shoulder reconstruction surgery, he received medical advice to retire from professional rugby.

=== International career ===
Before moving up to the full Welsh squad, Popham played for Wales Schoolboys, captained the Wales Under-21 team and played for Wales 'A'. His first taste of senior international rugby came in March 2000, when an injury to Scott Quinnell saw him called up to the bench for Wales' 26–18 win over Scotland in the Six Nations, though he did not come on. That summer, he was selected for a Wales development tour to Canada. After coming off the bench in the 19–0 win over Eastern Canada on 16 June, he captained the side for the next two matches – a 19–13 win over Ontario President's Select on 20 June and a 67–10 win over Canada A on 24 June. He did not play in the 32–17 win over Young Canada, before returning to captain the side for their final game, a 72–22 win over British Columbia President's Select on 1 July. The following year, with several senior players on the British & Irish Lions' tour to Australia, Popham was included in the Wales squad for their senior tour to Japan; he played in only two of the five matches, starting on the openside flank in a 33–22 win over a Japanese Select XV, and on the blindside flank in a 36–16 loss to the Pacific Barbarians.

In 2003, after playing in an uncapped match against the Barbarians on 31 May to mark Neil Jenkins' 100th Wales appearance, in which coach Steve Hansen said he was encouraged by his performance, Popham was then included in Wales' squad for their summer tour to Australia and New Zealand. He lost out to Jonathan Thomas for a place in the starting XV against Australia, but earned his first full cap off the bench as Wales lost 30–10. After being left out for the second match of the tour against New Zealand, he played in three of Wales' four warm-up matches ahead of the 2003 Rugby World Cup, scoring a try in the second, a 54–8 win over Romania in Wrexham that ended an 11-game losing run for Wales. He was named in the final 30-man squad for the tournament, starting the 27–20 win over Tonga and the 53–37 loss to New Zealand, only to be left out of the 28–17 loss to England in the quarter-finals.

After sitting out training in the week leading up to the match, Popham was left out for the 23–10 win over Scotland in the opening game of the 2004 Six Nations Championship, but was named on the bench for the game against Ireland the following week, coming on for the last 10 minutes of a 36–15 loss. He was released to play for Leeds in the down week between the Ireland and France games, but did not play against either France or England, returning to the bench for the final game against Italy. Popham came on for Michael Owen with two minutes left to play as Wales won 44–10. In the summer, Popham was named in the Wales squad for their tour to Argentina and South Africa; he did not play in the two tests in Argentina, but was named in the starting line-up for the test against South Africa after Owen pulled out with a back injury. Wales lost the match 53–18, and Popham had to be substituted shortly after half-time after being knocked out in a tackle with Jacques Cronjé; he was replaced by hooker Huw Bennett as a makeshift back-rower. Fly-half Ceri Sweeney put Popham in the recovery position and ensure he did not swallow his tongue. After being stretchered off, Popham was taken to a Pretoria hospital, where he was assessed with a concussion but no serious injuries. He flew home on schedule with the rest of the Wales squad and was expected to be fit to start the domestic season with Leeds.

Popham was named in the Wales squad for the 2004 Autumn internationals, but had to wait until the final match against Japan to play, missing out on a comfortable win over Romania and narrow defeats to South Africa and New Zealand. He came on in place of Ryan Jones for the last 10 minutes of the game against Japan, by which point Wales were already 84–0 up, on their way to a record 98–0 win. Popham was not included in Wales' squad for the 2005 Six Nations Championship, in which they went on to win their first Grand Slam since 1978. With 10 of that Grand Slam-winning team called up to the British & Irish Lions squad for their tour to New Zealand that summer, Popham was named as one of six back-row forwards for Wales' tour to North America. He did not play in Wales' 77–3 win over the United States in the opening match, but Ryan Jones' call-up to the Lions squad opened up a place for Popham to be promoted from the bench to the starting line-up for the game against Canada; he played the full 80 minutes and scored the last of Wales' nine tries in a 60–3 win.

Popham was again called up to the Wales squad for the 2005 Autumn internationals, and was named on the bench for the second match against Fiji on 11 November. He came on as a first-half replacement for the injured Dafydd Jones as Wales won 11–10 thanks to a last-minute drop goal. Popham retained his place in the Wales squad for the 2006 Six Nations, With Scarlets teammate Dafydd Jones suspended, Popham was named on the bench for the opening game against England, coming on for the last five minutes of the 47–13 defeat. He missed the next two matches, either side of head coach Mike Ruddock's resignation and replacement by Scott Johnson, but his performance for the Scarlets against Bath on 4 March – and the sub-standard performances of captain Michael Owen – saw him restored to the Wales bench for the home game against Italy on 11 March. He came on for Colin Charvis early in the second half, but Wales drew the match 18–18, giving Italy their first ever away point in the Six Nations. Charvis was dropped for the final game against France on 18 March, allowing Popham to make his first Six Nations start at number 8, with Owen replacing Charvis at blindside flanker; Popham credited his place in the line-up to his persistent badgering of coach Scott Johnson. Wales led the match going into the final five minutes, but a converted try by Florian Fritz gave France a 21–16 win and the Six Nations title.

A red card while playing for the Scarlets put Popham's eligibility for Wales' summer tour to Argentina in doubt, but the two-week ban he ultimately received meant he would be available for both tests. With Michael Owen rested for the tour and ultimately undergoing shoulder surgery, Popham and Gareth Delve were the only specialist number 8s included in the squad picked by his former Scarlets coach, Gareth Jenkins, who was leading Wales for the first time, and having filled the role in the final game of the Six Nations, Popham was expected to be the first-choice number 8 for the test series. Popham started the first test, but was one of two Wales players to be yellow-carded during the match as they lost 27–25 in the former Welsh colony of Puerto Madryn. In addition to his yellow card, Popham was accused of foul play for an off-the-ball tackle on Argentina hooker Mario Ledesma, putting a target on his back for the second test. He again started that match, but had to be substituted at half-time after suffering a knee injury.

Because of a shoulder injury to Delve and Owen's ongoing rehabilitation, Ryan Jones was Popham's only competition at number 8 in the initial squad announced for the 2006 Autumn internationals. Jones was preferred at the base of the scrum for the opening game against Australia, while Alun Wyn Jones was selected on the bench because of his ability to cover at both second row and flanker, leaving no room for Popham. He returned to the starting line-up as one of 14 changes for the match against a combined Pacific Islanders team, with a fit-again Owen named at lock. Popham almost scored a try in the opening minute, but was tackled just short of the line. He played the full match as Wales won 38–20, ending a run of six matches without a win. H dropped out of the matchday squad again for the game against Canada the following week, but he was named on the bench for the final game against New Zealand, coming on shortly after half-time as Wales lost 45–10. Despite his limited involvement for Wales in the autumn, Popham's performances for the Scarlets made him a leading contender to feature heavily in the 2007 Six Nations. He was picked as one of six specialist back-rowers, before being named as the starting blindside flanker for the opening game against Ireland. He was named in the same position for the remainder of the tournament, scoring a try in the third match, a 32–21 away defeat to France; however, Wales lost four of their five matches, including a first ever home defeat to Italy, but managed to avoid a whitewash and the wooden spoon with a final-day victory over England.

Ahead of the 2007 Rugby World Cup, which started in September 2007, Popham was one of 20 players rested for Wales' two-test tour to Australia that May and June, before being named in the extended training squad from which the World Cup squad would primarily be drawn. He was named on the bench for the first of Wales' three World Cup warm-up matches, coming on for Michael Owen for the last half-hour of a record 62–5 loss to England on 4 August, before being named in the final 30-man squad a week later. He then started at number 8 in the 27–20 win over Argentina on 18 August, and in the 34–7 loss to France on 26 August. His performance in that match led to him holding onto the number 8 jersey for Wales' opening match of the World Cup against Canada, which finished in a 42–17 win; however, he was dropped in favour of Colin Charvis for the second game against Australia, and was named on the bench instead. Popham's only involvement was as a temporary blood substitution early in the game as Wales lost 32–20. He returned to the starting line-up for the 72–18 win over Japan, before scoring Wales' opening try in their must-win final game against Fiji; however, they lost the game 38–34 and were knocked out of the World Cup.

After the World Cup, Popham was named in a 31-man squad for Wales' one-off test against South Africa in November 2007. He was named on the bench for the match, coming on for Charvis for the last 20 minutes of the 34–12 defeat. This was followed by a call-up to new coach Warren Gatland's first squad in charge for the 2008 Six Nations. He was named on the bench for the opening match against England as Gatland picked 13 Ospreys players in his starting XV, including Ryan Jones at number 8. Popham came on early in the game after Jonathan Thomas was knocked out in a tackle. England led 19–6 with just over 20 minutes to play, but Wales came back to win 26–19. Wales went on to win the Grand Slam, but the England game proved to be Popham's last for Wales, as he was dropped for the Scotland game the following week, for a perceived lack of on-field discipline. He was due to be part of the official Grand Slam team photograph after Wales' final-day win over France, but traffic meant he was unable to make it back to the Millennium Stadium; his absence sparked rumours that he had fallen out with the Wales coaching staff, but he was later invited to be part of the squad that toured South Africa in the summer, only to decline the opportunity due to his impending move from the Scarlets to Brive. Following an injury to Jonathan Thomas in October 2008, Popham was mooted as a potential replacement for the Autumn internationals, but he was not called up.

== Honours ==
Leeds

- Anglo-Welsh Cup: 2004–05

Wales

- Six Nations Championship: 2008

== Personal life ==
Popham has three children, two with his first wife, Jo, and one with his second wife, Melanie. Jo Popham worked for BBC Wales as part of their Scrum V radio show.

In March 2007, Popham was involved in a road collision with a pedestrian in Cardiff city centre, while travelling to a training session at the Millennium Stadium. The pedestrian received minor injuries and no one was arrested in connection with the incident.

In April 2020, Popham was diagnosed with early onset dementia; doctors estimated his brain had suffered up to 100,000 sub-concussions over the course of his 14-year professional career. Together with Steve Thompson and Michael Lipman, Popham filed legal claims against the Rugby Football Union, the Welsh Rugby Union and World Rugby for the injuries they sustained playing the game.
