= Nick Macleod =

Welsh rugby union footballer

- Born: Nick Macleod; 23 March 1983 (age 43) Cardiff, Wales
- Height: 1.85 m (6 ft 1 in)
- Weight: 87 kg (13 st 10 lb)
- School: Bishop of Llandaff

Rugby union career
- Position(s): Fly-half, Full-back
Senior career
| Years | Team | Apps | (Points) |
| 2001–2007 | Cardiff RFC | 26 | (176) |
| 2003–2008 | Cardiff Blues | 82 | (240) |
| 2008–2016 | Sale Sharks | 153 | (705) |
| 2016–2017 | Dragons | 6 | (32) |
- Correct as of 29 October 2016
International career
| Years | Team | Apps | (Points) |
| 2002 | Wales U19 | | |
| 2004 | Wales U21 | | |

Nick Macleod (born 23 March 1983 in Cardiff, Wales) is a former professional rugby union player who played for Cardiff Blues, Sale Sharks and Newport Gwent Dragons. Primarily a fly-half, Macleod also played at Fullback.

== Professional career ==
Macleod came through the Cardiff Blues system, playing for the U21 side, and made his debut for Cardiff RFC in November 2001 against Cambridge University. Macleod played for Wales U19 in 2002, and Wales U21 in 2004. Macleod made his debut for Cardiff Blues on 5 September 2003, against Glasgow, scoring a try.

Macleod was selected for Wales for the 2006 Wales rugby union tour of Argentina, in place of the injured Hal Luscombe. Macleod did not gain a cap during the tour, and ultimately never achieved a Wales cap.

In April 2008, it was announced that Macleod would leave Cardiff to sign for the Sale Sharks on a two-year deal. Macleod departed Cardiff with 82 appearances and scored 240 points.

Macleod began the 2010–11 season as Sale's fly-half in the absence of the team's first choice, Charlie Hodgson; when Hodgson returned in late September he took over the position. In a Challenge Cup match for Sale against Cetransa El Salvador on 8 October 2010, Macleod equalled the club's record for most points scored in a game by a single player. When fly-half Charlie Hodgson, who previously held the record, was rested at half-time Macleod took over goal kicking. With two tries and eight successful conversions, Macleod scored 26 points in the match. The following month, Macleod experienced what he described a "highlight of [his] career so far" when he stepped up to captain Sale in a 24–19 defeat to Exeter. Regular captain Neil Briggs was unavailable due to injury and Macleod filled the position. Hodgson suffered a broken foot in December, ruling him out for several months. In his absence, Macleod took the role of Sale's regular fly-half. Macleod's elevation to the captaincy was temporary and winger Mark Cueto was appointed captain in late December 2010 by new coach Pete Anglesea, who replaced Mike Brewer as Sale had won just three out of nine matches in the 2010–11 season.

Hodgson left at the end of the 2010–11 season and the club chose not to sign a new fly-half. This meant that Macleod would be given a regular chance in the position. He had a successful run, scoring 231 points by mid-February when he signed a two-year extension on his contract. Macleod signed a further extension in November 2013.

MacLeod joined Newport Gwent Dragons for the 2016–17 season and made six appearances before suffering a ligament injury which eventually forced him to retire from professional rugby; he now works as a baker in Cardiff.
