= Pablo Gambarini =

Argentine rugby union player (born 1980)

- Full name: Pablo Martin Gambarini
- Born: 5 May 1980 (age 46) Tucumán Province, Argentina
- Height: 5 ft 10 in (178 cm)
- Weight: 224 lb (102 kg)

Rugby union career
- Position: Hooker
Youth career
- Universitario Rugby Club de Tucumán
Senior career
Years	Team	Apps	(Points)
- Club Atlético San Isidro
International career
Years	Team	Apps	(Points)
2006–2008	Argentina	8	(5)

Pablo Martin Gambarini (born 5 May 1980) is an Argentine former professional rugby union player who played as a hooker. Born in Tucumán Province, he played for Universitario Rugby Club de Tucumán before joining Club Atlético San Isidro (CASI) at the age of 9. He came up through the age grades before breaking into the first team. He was named as the club's player of the year, taking all sports into account, in 2006.

He received his first call-up to the Argentina national team in April 2006 ahead of two tests against Wales and one against New Zealand that June. He made his debut in the second test against Wales, coming on for Mario Ledesma for the last five minutes. His next appearance came in a 2007 Rugby World Cup qualifying match against Chile on 1 July 2006; after coming off the bench, he scored one of Argentina's 10 tries in a 60–13 win. He made another substitute appearance in the 26–0 win over Uruguay the following week, which saw Argentina not only qualify for the 2007 Rugby World Cup, but also win the 2006 South American Rugby Championship "A". He made his first start for Argentina in the second test against Ireland on 2 June 2007, before retaining the number 2 jersey against Italy a week later. He missed out on selection for the 2007 Rugby World Cup, and only made two more starts for Argentina, both for a weakened side in the South American Rugby Championship, against Chile in 2007 and 2008. Those came either side of a substitute appearance in the second test against Scotland in Rosario in June 2008.
