= Rack 'n Roll =

2007 FIRST Robotics Competition game

- Year: 2007

Season Information
- Number of teams: 1305
- Number of regionals: 36; 1 pilot
- Championship location: Georgia Dome, Atlanta, Georgia, United States

FIRST Championship Awards
- Chairman's Award winner: Team 365 - "MOE"
- Woodie Flowers Award winner: Dan Green - Team 111
- Founder's Award winner: General Motors
- Champions: Team 190 - "Gompei and the Herd"; Team 987 - "High Rollers"; Team 177 - "BobCat Robotics"

Rack 'n Roll was the game for the 2007 FIRST Robotics Competition season, announced on January 6, 2007. In it, two alliances of three teams each competed to arrange ring-shaped game pieces on a central arena element known as 'The Rack'.

== Robots ==
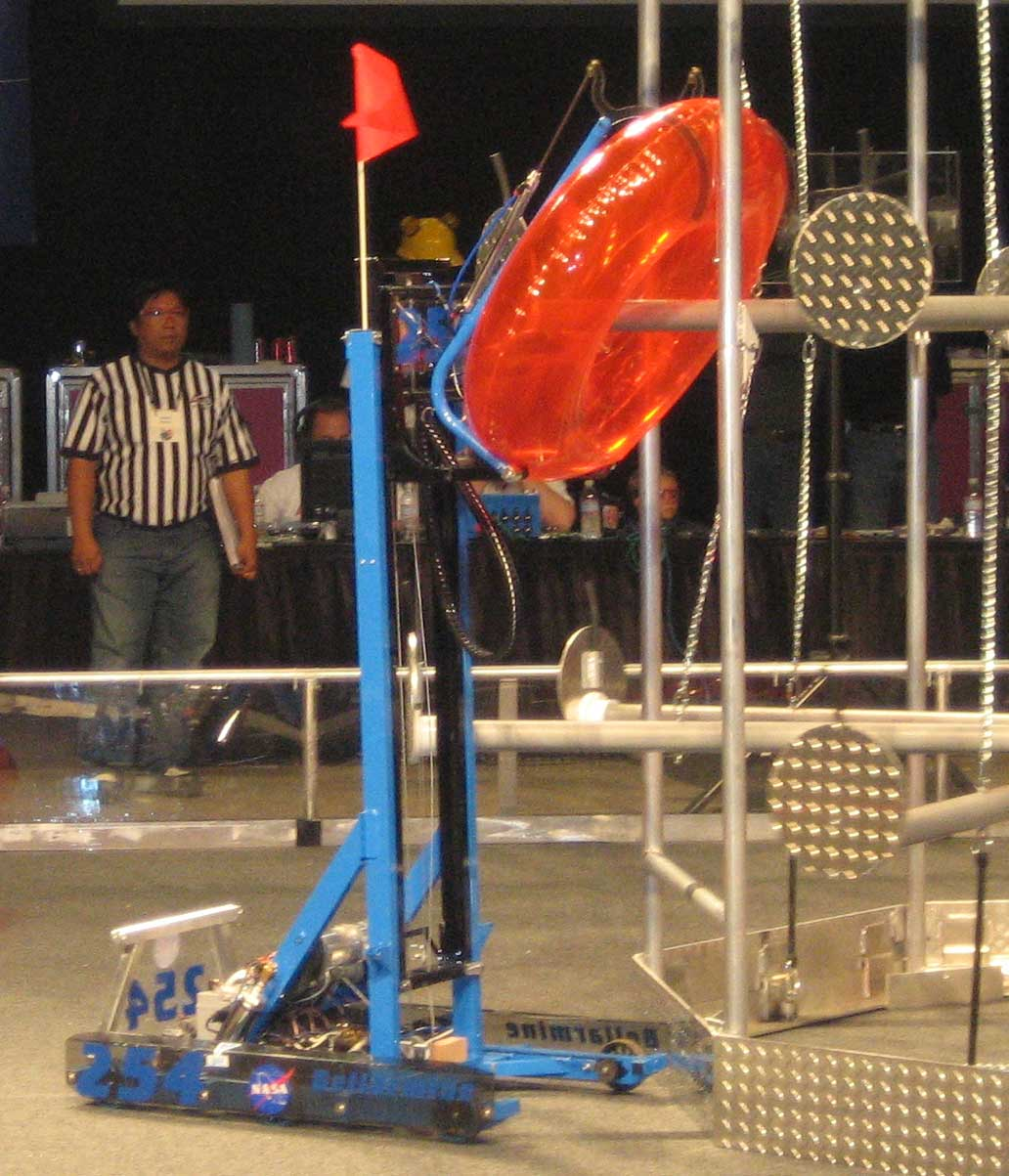
"Raptor", Team 254's 2007 robot.

=== Classes ===
Robots fall under three different classes restricting their maximum weight and height. These classes are:

Class	I	II	III
Height	48 in (1,219 mm)	60 in (1,524 mm)	72 in (1,829 mm)
Weight	120 lb (54 kg)	110 lb (50 kg)	100 lb (45 kg)

=== Other restrictions ===
Robots also must have a maximum starting footprint of 28" x 38" regardless of class. Robots may expand once the match has begun. The game manual includes other rules restricting various aspects of the construction of the robot that have been put in place for the purpose of safety and fairness.

== Field ==
The Rack, as shown in the 2007 game manual

The Rack 'n Roll field is dominated by 'The Rack', a large metal contraption with three levels of hanging metal bars, with each level having 8 arms evenly spaced in an octagonal manner. Each arm (known as a 'spider leg') has space for two game pieces. Any more pieces placed on a spider leg beyond the first two are ignored for scoring purposes. At the beginning of the match, the rack is arbitrarily translated or rotated within three feet of the center of the field in order to give some randomness and to encourage autonomous modes that do not depend on dead-reckoning. At the top of the Rack are four green-colored lights above the 1, 3, 5, and 7 legs to aid in autonomous-mode tracking.

== Game pieces ==
The game pieces in Rack 'n Roll are inflatable toroidal pool toys. There are 3 styles: Keepers, Ringers, and Spoilers. Keepers are tubes with lettering that are placed only during autonomous mode and, once placed, override any pieces placed later for scoring purposes. Ringers are undecorated tubes that are delivered onto the field either by human players via chutes, or are picked from the floor. Nine ringers of each color start on the field in the opposing team's start area (so the 9 blue ringers are in the red alliance's end zone, and vice versa). The other nine start behind the end wall, to be given out by human players. Spoilers are colored black, and cause the spider arm holding them to be ignored for scoring purposes. Spoilers can be removed or repositioned on the rack by robots multiple times. Each alliance starts with two spoilers, accessible by their human players.

== Game play ==
Each match of Rack 'n Roll is 2 minutes 15 seconds long, divided into three segments. The first segment is a 15 second autonomous period, where robots may attempt to place keepers onto the rack without human input. Once autonomous mode is complete, any keepers not already on the rack are no longer valid for scoring. The second segment, the teleoperated mode, is 2 minutes long, during which robots are operated by the drivers and may roam anywhere on the field. In the final 15 seconds, the end game, robots may not enter their opponent's end zone, but all other rules remain the same from the teleoperated period. Though the head referee may pause the game between the autonomous period and the teleoperated period, the end game follows directly after the teleoperated period.

== Scoring ==
=== Rack scoring ===
The primary method of scoring in Rack 'n Roll is by making rows and columns of tubes on the rack. A row or column of n tubes is worth 2^{n} points to a maximum of n=8. Note that this includes rows or columns of length 1, so a single tube on the rack that does not form a row or column is worth 2 points. Teams have access to 21 scorable keepers and ringers. This means that the maximum possible score from the rack should be 596. That is, two rows of 8 ringers, a row of 5 (2 ringers plus 3 keepers), 5 vertical columns of length 3, then 3 vertical columns of length 2.

=== Robot scoring ===
Team 573's 2007 FRC robot scoring

As is usual in a FIRST game, robot positions at the end of the match are worth bonus points. In Rack n' Roll, each robot in its alliance end zone that is not touching any field element and has its lowest part 4 or more inches off the ground will score 15 bonus points. A robot that is not touching any field element and has its lowest part 12 or more inches off the ground will score 30 bonus points. Since robots may not be touching any field element, this means that in order to score bonus points, teams will have to depend on their alliance partners to provide mechanisms to lift their robots or will have to have mechanisms to lift their alliance partner's robots. Since at least one robot must be touching the ground in order to lift the other two alliance robots off the ground, the maximum conceivable bonus points an alliance can score is 60 points.

== Kit of parts ==
The kit of parts included a few new items, including a new battery and the new EasyC Pro. One substantial rule change is that batteries from previous competitions are not legal, a change that can be easily enforced since the 2007 batteries are visually different from earlier batteries.

== Notable events ==
In the first week of regionals, a bug in the match scheduling system caused many teams to face one other team in all or almost all of their matches.

== Competition season ==
=== Regional events ===
The following regional events were held in 2007:

- Arizona Regional - Phoenix
- BAE Systems Granite State Regional - Manchester, NH
- Bayou Regional - New Orleans
- Boilermaker Regional - West Lafayette, IN
- Boston Regional - Boston
- Brazil Pilot - Porto Alegre, Brazil (pilot)
- Buckeye Regional - Cleveland, OH
- Chesapeake Regional - Annapolis, MD
- Colorado Regional - Denver
- Davis Sacramento Regional - Davis, CA
- Detroit Regional - Detroit
- Finger Lakes Regional - Rochester, NY
- Florida Regional - Orlando
- GM/Technion Israel Regional - Tel Aviv, Israel
- Great Lakes Regional - Ypsilanti, MI
- Greater Kansas City Regional - Kansas City, MO
- Greater Toronto Regional - Mississauga, ON
- Las Vegas Regional - Las Vegas
- Lone Star Regional - Houston
- Midwest Regional - Chicago
- NASA/VCU Regional - Richmond, VA
- New Jersey Regional - Trenton, NJ
- New York City Regional - New York City
- Pacific Northwest Regional - Portland
- Palmetto Regional - Columbia, SC
- Peachtree Regional - Duluth, GA
- Philadelphia Regional - Philadelphia
- Pittsburgh Regional - Pittsburgh
- St. Louis Regional - St. Charles, MO
- San Diego Regional - San Diego
- SBPLI Long Island Regional - Hempstead, NY
- Silicon Valley Regional - San Jose, CA
- Southern California Regional - Los Angeles
- UTC Connecticut Regional - Hartford, CT
- Waterloo Regional - Waterloo, ON
- West Michigan Regional - Allendale, MI
- Wisconsin Regional - Milwaukee

=== Final round on Einstein ===
The championship was held in the Georgia Dome, Atlanta.

Semifinals
(United States) 179 - 233 - 71	-	88	N/P	2W
(United States) 910 - 1270 - 330	DQ	74	N/P	0W
(United States) 1902 - 173 - 1319	54	34	32	1W
(United States) 190 - 987 - 177	32	48	44	2W

Finals
(United States) 179 - 233 - 71	50	58	54	1W
(United States) 190 - 987 - 177	34	72	59	2W
