= Old York Cellars =

American winery located in New Jersey

Coordinates: 40.449705°N 74.838132°W

- Location: 80 Old York Road, Ringoes, NJ, USA
- Coordinates: 40.449705 N, 74.838132 W
- Formerly: Amwell Valley Vineyard
- Other labels: What Exit Wines, Darryl Mack Cellars
- First vines planted: 1978
- Opened to the public: 2010
- Key people: David Wolin (owner); Scott Gares (winemaker); Chris O'Brien (Chief Financial Officer)
- Area cultivated: 12
- Cases/yr: 3,600 (estimated, 2012)
- Other attractions: wine tasting, winery tours, private events, pairing menu, picnicking permitted
- Distribution: On-site, NJ Wegmans, NJ liquor stores, NJ restaurants, home shipment
- Tasting: Daily tastings, wine pairing menu, winery tours, picnicking permitted
- Website: oldyorkcellars.com

Old York Cellars is a winery in the Ringoes section of East Amwell in Hunterdon County, New Jersey. Originally owned and established by the Fishers of Ringoes, the winery was purchased by David Wolin in 2008 and opened to the public in 2010. Old York Cellars has 12 acres of grapes under cultivation, and produces an estimated 3,600 cases of wine per year. The winery is named for the road where it is located.

== Wines ==
Old York Cellars produces wine from Barbera, Cabernet Sauvignon, Cayuga White, Chardonnay, Chenin blanc, Colobel, Landot noir, Malbec, Marechal Foch, Merlot, Pinot gris, Riesling, Seyval blanc, Syrah, Vidal blanc, and Vignoles (Ravat 51) grapes. Old York also makes fruit wines from blackberries and peaches. The winery has a separate brand of New Jersey-themed vintages (named "What Exit Wines") that are used to raise money for special events, including Hurricane Sandy relief in 2012. Old York is the only winery in New Jersey that produces wine from Colobel, a red hybrid grape developed in France in the early twentieth century that is often used for wine coloration. The winery is not located in one of New Jersey's three viticultural areas.

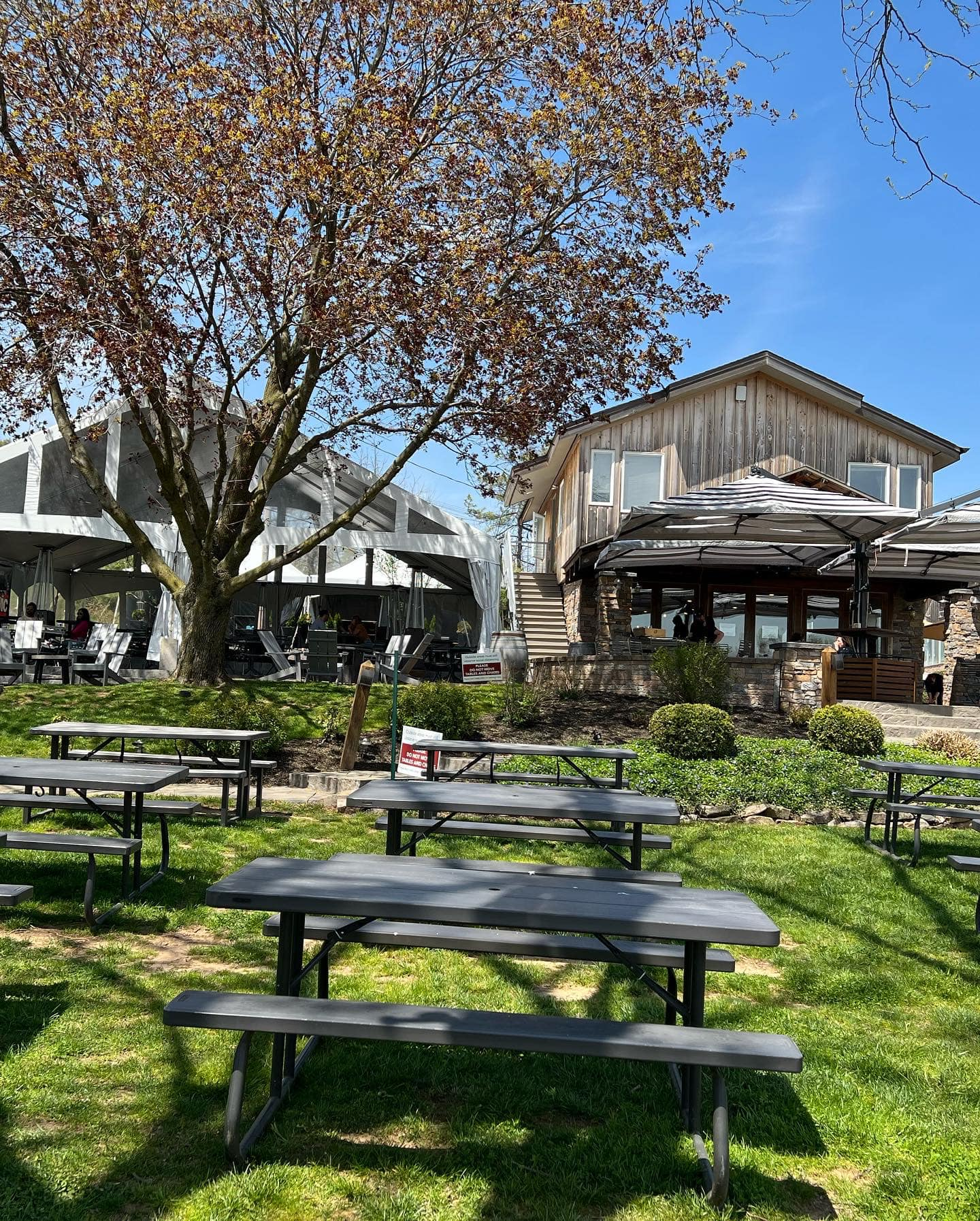
Old York Cellars offers a variety of event spaces to enjoy year-round.

== Licensing and Associations ==
Old York Cellars has a plenary winery license from the New Jersey Division of Alcoholic Beverage Control, which allows it to produce an unrestricted amount of wine, operate up to 15 off-premises sales rooms, and ship wine throughout NJ and to 20 states. The winery is a member of the Garden State Wine Growers Association and its subsidiary, Vintage North Jersey.

== See also ==
- Alcohol laws of New Jersey
- American wine
- Judgment of Princeton
- List of wineries, breweries, and distilleries in New Jersey
- New Jersey Farm Winery Act
- New Jersey wine
- New Jersey Wine Industry Advisory Council
