= Jamie Ringer =

Wales international rugby union footballer

- Born: James Edward Ringer; 18 January 1976 (age 50) Cardiff, Wales
- Height: 1.91 m (6 ft 3 in)
- Weight: 16 st 3 lb (103 kg)

Rugby union career
- Position: Flanker
Senior career
Years	Team	Apps	(Points)
1996–1999	Cardiff	95	(80)
1999–2002	Bridgend		
2002–2003	Neath		
2003–2009	Newport GD	140	(35)
2009–2013	Cardiff	57	(5)
International career
Years	Team	Apps	(Points)
2001	Wales	2	(0)

James Edward Ringer (born 18 January 1976) is a retired Wales international rugby union player. Ringer played for Cardiff RFC, Bridgend RFC, Neath RFC, and Newport Gwent Dragons, and earned two caps for Wales national rugby union team.

== Domestic career ==
A flanker, capable of playing both blind and open-side, he started playing in the Welsh premiership for Cardiff RFC at the age of 19. Ringer moved to Bridgend RFC in 1999 before joining Neath RFC in 2002. Ringer's time at Neath was short as he joined Newport Gwent Dragons in 2003. During his time with the region he gained over 100 caps and scored 7 tries. In 2008, he became the second Dragons player to reach 100 caps, after Adam Black. In May 2009 he rejoined Cardiff RFC as a player-coach. He continued playing semi professionally until retiring in 2014, aged 37.

== International career ==
Ringer earned youth caps for Wales U18s, U19s and U21s. He also won caps for Wales 'A' and Wales 7s. Full international caps were hard to come by due to the prevalence of Welsh flankers at the time, including captain Martyn Williams. Ringer's only chance came on the 2001 summer tour to Japan. The British & Irish Lions were on tour in Australia at the time and several key Wales players, including Martyn Williams, were unavailable. Ringer played twice against Japan. On debut Ringer won an assist by passing to Jamie Robinson before he scored. Wales won both tests of the tour.

After an injury to Dafydd Jones, Ringer was called up for the 2006 Wales rugby union tour of Argentina, but did not feature on any of the tests.

== Coaching career ==
After retiring, Ringer was defence coach for Merthyr RFC for two seasons.

== Family ==
Ringer is the son of Welsh international rugby union flanker Paul Ringer. And brother of rugby union prop, Joel Bennett Ringer.
