= Joel Bennett Ringer =

Welsh entrepreneur and former rugby union player

Joel Ringer
- Born: Joel Bennett Ringer; 2 November 1996 (age 30) Cardiff, Wales
- Height: 191 cm (6 ft 3 in)
- School: Stanwell School
- Notable relative(s): Paul Ringer; Jamie Ringer
- Occupation: Entrepreneur

Rugby union career
- Position: Tighthead prop
Youth career
- 2012–2015: Cardiff Blues
- 2015: RC Toulon
Senior career
| Years | Team | Apps | (Points) |
| 2016–2018 | Rugby Club Vannes | | |
| 2018 | RGC 1404 | | |
International career
| Years | Team | Apps | (Points) |
| 2013 | Wales U16 | | |
| 2014 | Wales U18 | | |

Joel Bennett Ringer (born 2 November 1996) is a Welsh entrepreneur and former professional rugby union player. A former tighthead prop, he developed through the Cardiff Blues youth system before joining the academy of French club RC Toulon, and later played for Rugby Club Vannes and RGC 1404.

Following his rugby career, Ringer moved into entrepreneurship and e-commerce. His ventures have generated more than £1 million in cumulative online sales. He founded the e-commerce brand Clomfy London and later sold the business to a private buyer in the United States. He also co-founded Founders Club Commerce and, in 2025, co-founded men's haircare brand Partenope with Italian model, actor and social-media personality Antonio Medugno.

== Early life and rugby career ==
Ringer was born in Cardiff, Wales, and attended Stanwell School. He is the son of former Wales dual-code international Paul Ringer and the younger brother of former Wales international Jamie Ringer.

Ringer played as a tighthead prop and developed through the Cardiff Blues youth system. He also represented Wales at age-grade level.

In 2015, aged 18, Ringer joined the academy of French club RC Toulon after impressing during a trial with the club.

He later played in France with Rugby Club Vannes before returning to Wales and joining RGC 1404 in 2018.

Following the end of his playing career, Ringer moved away from professional rugby and pursued a career in business.

== Business career ==
Following his rugby career, Ringer entered entrepreneurship, focusing primarily on e-commerce and direct-to-consumer businesses.

Ringer founded e-commerce brand Clomfy London. The Clomfy and Clomfy London names were registered as a UK trade mark under his name in 2025. He later sold the business to a private buyer in the United States.

In a 2026 appearance on the Theo Clarke Podcast, Ringer said that the idea for Clomfy emerged after he began testing a clog-style shoe and contacted early customers to understand why they had purchased it, discovering that many were healthcare workers; he subsequently repositioned the brand toward that market.

His e-commerce ventures have generated more than £1 million in cumulative online sales.

Ringer later co-founded Founders Club Commerce, an e-commerce consultancy focused on helping entrepreneurs build and scale online businesses. His professional profile publicly identifies him with Founders Club Commerce.

He has also worked with consumer brands on e-commerce growth strategy. Wellness company ELIXER has described Ringer as an e-commerce entrepreneur involved in the company's growth strategy.

In 2025, Ringer co-founded men's haircare and grooming company Partenope with Italian model, actor and social-media personality Antonio Medugno.

Italian newspaper la Repubblica subsequently reported on the partnership, identifying Ringer as Medugno's business partner in the creation of Partenope Hair.

Medugno has built a multi-million-person following on social media and has appeared on Italian television, including Grande Fratello VIP.

Ringer has continued to operate and develop e-commerce businesses alongside his work with Founders Club Commerce and Partenope.

== Charity work ==
While pursuing his rugby career, Ringer founded Save Our Sighthounds, an animal-welfare initiative established to support neglected and mistreated sighthounds in Wales.

== Public profile ==
Following his transition from professional sport into business, Ringer has increasingly focused his public and social-media content on entrepreneurship, fitness and personal development.

== Personal life ==
Ringer is the son of former Wales international Paul Ringer and the younger brother of former Wales international Jamie Ringer.
