= Paul Ringer =

Wales international dual-code rugby player

- Born: Paul Ringer; 28 January 1948 (age 78) Leeds, England

Rugby union career
- Position: Flanker
Senior career
Years	Team	Apps	(Points)
–	Ebbw Vale RFC		
–	Llanelli RFC		
–	Leicester		
International career
Years	Team	Apps	(Points)
1978-80	Wales	8	(8)
- Rugby league career

Playing information
- Position: Loose forward
Club
Years	Team	Pld	T	G	FG	P
1981–84	Blue Dragons	64				42
Representative
Years	Team	Pld	T	G	FG	P
1981–82	Wales	2				0

Paul Ringer (born 28 January 1948) is an English-born former Welsh dual-code international rugby union and professional rugby league footballer. He played representative level rugby union for Wales and at club level for Ebbw Vale RFC, Llanelli RFC and Leicester, as a flanker. Having turned professional, he played representative level rugby league for Wales and at club level for Cardiff City (Bridgend) Blue Dragons, as a loose forward.

== International honours ==
Paul Ringer was born in Leeds. He earned his first rugby union cap for Wales against New Zealand, at Cardiff, in 1978 and was capped on total of 8 occasions. His final game was two years later in 1980, again at Cardiff against New Zealand. An abrasive and uncompromising forward, in a notorious international match between Wales and England at Twickenham in 1980 he was sent off for a challenge on English outside half John Horton controversially deemed as late by the referee. This controversy proved costly for Ringer as he was not selected for that summer's British Lions tour to South Africa.

Paul Ringer won caps for Wales (RL) while at Cardiff City (Bridgend) Blue Dragons 1981...1982 2-caps.

== Note ==
Before the start of the 1984/85 season, Cardiff City Blue Dragons relocated from Ninian Park in Cardiff, to Coychurch Road Ground in Bridgend, and were renamed Bridgend Blue Dragons.

== Family history ==
Paul Ringer is the father of rugby union footballer of the 1990s, 2000s and 2010s; Jamie Ringer, and rugby union footballer; Joel Bennett Ringer.
