= Herb Ringer =

American photographer (1913–1998)

- Born: July 15, 1913; New York City, U.S.
- Died: December 11, 1998 (aged 85)
- Occupation: Photographer

Herb Ringer (July 15, 1913 – December 11, 1998) was an amateur photographer who chronicled the rural and wilderness areas of the Western United States and Western Canada.

== Early life; career ==
Ringer was born in Brooklyn, New York. Not long after, the Ringer family moved to the Mt. Auburn section of Cincinnati, Ohio.

Ringer moved to Reno, Nevada, in 1939, and began his lifelong practice of traveling to explore the west, making journal entries about his travels while taking what are now estimated to be almost 10,000 photographs. Ringer from the start used 35 mm cameras but later bought a camera taking 120 film; he was an early and consistent user of Kodachrome color film.

When in 1989 Jim Stiles began publishing the Canyon Country Zephyr (motto: "All the news that causes fits . . . since 1989") in Moab, Utah, among the regular features were Ringer's photos and his recollections of the west in the earlier 20th century.

Although Ringer died in 1998, his photos and memories continue to be a regular feature of the Zephyr and its website.

A section of the documentary Brave New West from High Plains Films includes footage of Ringer shot in the late 1980s and early 1990s. In the film, Stiles sums up the uniqueness of Ringer's photography: "While a tourist might take a picture of Grand Arch, Herb would take a photo of the tourist taking the photo of Grand Arch. He was a true archivist of the changing West."
