= 1988 Ireland rugby union tour of France =

- Manager: K.E. Reid
- Coach: Jimmy Davidson
- Tour captain: Willie Anderson
Summary
P	W	D	L
Total
4	1	0	3

Tour chronology
- ← Japan 1985 North America 1989 →

The Ireland national rugby union team toured France in May 1988, playing four matches, including two against a France XV team. None of the matches were considered tests as many of the Irish players were unavailable for the tour.

== Matches ==
Scores and results list Ireland's points tally first.

Opposing Team	For	Against	Date	Venue
Côté Basque XV	23	33	12 May	Biarritz
France XV	19	18	14 May	Auch
France XV	7	12	18 May	Lorient
French Barbarians	26	41	22 May	La Rochelle

== Touring party ==
- Manager: K.E. Reid
- Coach: Jim Davidson
- Captain: Willie Anderson

=== Players ===
- Fergus Aherne (Dolphin)
- Willie Anderson (Dungannon)
- Nicky Barry (Garryowen)
- Rab Brady (Ballymena)
- Tom Clancy (Lansdowne)
- Paul Clinch (Lansdowne)
- Vince Cunningham (St Mary's College)
- Phil Danaher (Lansdowne)
- Neil Francis (Blackrock College)
- Mick Galwey (Shannon)
- Michael Gibson (London Irish)
- Bill Harbinson (Malone)
- Denis McBride Malone)
- J. J. McCoy (Bangor)
- John McDonald (Malone)
- Peter Millar (Ballymena)
- Michael Moylett (Shannon)
- Pat O'Hara (Sunday's Well)
- Nick Popplewell (Greystones)
- Pete Purcell (Lansdowne)
- John Sexton (Dublin University)
- Steve Smith (Ballymena)
- Tony Ward (Greystones)
- Don Whittle (Bangor)
