= 1989 Ireland rugby union tour of North America =

Summary
P	W	D	L
Total
4	4	0	0
Test match
2	2	0	0
Opponent
P	W	D	L
Canada
1	1	0	0
United States
1	1	0	0

Tour chronology
- ← France 1988 Namibia 1991 →

== Matches ==
Scores and results list Ireland's points tally first.

Opposing Team	For	Against	Date	Venue
British Columbia	21	18	30 August 1989	Thunderbird Stadium, Vancouver
Canada	24	21	2 September 1989	Royal Athletic Park, Victoria
Mid-West XV	58	6	6 September 1989	Northfield
United States	32	7	9 September 1989	Downing Stadium, New York

== Touring party ==
- Tour Manager: K.E. Reid
- Team Manager: J. Davidson
- Captain: Willie Anderson

=== Backs ===
- Fergus Aherne (Lansdowne)
- Nicky Barry (Garryowen)
- Michael Bradley (Cork Constitution)
- Paul Clinch (Lansdowne)
- Keith Crossan (Instonians)
- Phil Danaher (Garryowen)
- Fergus Dunlea (Lansdowne)
- Paul Haycock (Terenure College)
- Michael Kiernan (Dolphin)
- Peter Purcell (Lansdowne)
- John Sexton (Lansdowne)/(Oxford University)

=== Forwards ===
- Willie Anderson (Dungannon)
- Tom Clancy (Lansdowne)
- Neil Francis (London Irish)
- Gary Halpin (Wanderers)
- P. Kenny (Wanderers)
- Terry Kingston (Dolphin)
- Noel Mannion (Corinthians)
- Phillip Matthews (Wanderers)
- Denis McBride (Malone)
- J.J. McCoy (Bangor)
- John MacDonald (Malone)
- Pat O'Hara (Sunday's Well)
- Nick Popplewell (Greystones)
- Brian Rigney (Greystones)
