= 1985 Ireland rugby union tour of Japan =

Summary
P	W	D	L
Total
5	5	0	0
Opponent
P	W	D	L
Japan
2	2	0	0

Tour chronology
- ← South Africa 1981 France 1988 →

The Ireland national rugby union team toured Japan in summer 1985, playing five matches, including two against the Japan national team. The IRFU did not initially award caps for these internationals. The Ciaran Fitzgerald-led side earned a 48–13 victory in the first clash in Osaka, with winger Trevor Ringland scoring three tries. In the second tie at Tokyo's Chichibu ground, Michael Kiernan scored two tries as the Irish came from being level-pegging at 12–12 at half-time, to leading 33–15 with a second half spurt by the final whistle .

== Matches ==
Scores and results list Ireland's points tally first.

Opposing Team	For	Against	Date	Venue
East Japan XV	42	15	19 May 1985	Morioka
Japan B	34	10	21 May 1985	Sendai
Japan	48	13	26 May 1985	Hanazono Field, Osaka
West Japan XV	44	13	29 May 1985	Nagoya
Japan	33	15	2 June 1985	Chichibunomiya Stadium, Tokyo

== Touring party ==
- Manager: Des McKibbin
- Assistant Manager: Mick Doyle
- Medical Officer: J. Gallagher
- Captain: Ciaran Fitzgerald (St Mary's College)

Backs

- Philip Rainey (Ballymena)
- Hugo MacNeill (Oxford U, London Irish)
- Trevor Ringland (Ballymena)
- Keith Crossan (Instonians)
- Mike Kiernan (Lansdowne, Dolphin)
- Brendan Mullin (Dublin U)
- Moss Finn (Cork Con)
- Terry McMaster (Bangor)
- J. Hewitt (NIFC) joined tour as replacement
- Paul Dean (St Mary’s Coll)
- Ralph Keyes (Cork Con)
- Michael Bradley (Cork Con)
- R. Brady (Ballymena)

Forwards

- Paul Kennedy (London Irish)
- Mick Fitzpatrick (Wanderers)
- J. J. McCoy (Dungannon)
- Philip Orr (Old Wesley)
- Ciaran Fitzgerald (St Mary’s Coll)
- Harry Harbison (Bective Rangers)
- Brian McCall (London Irish)
- Willie Anderson (Dungannon)
- Donal Lenihan (Cork Con)
- Nigel Carr (Ards)
- Phillip Matthews (Ards)
- Brian Spillane (Bohemians)
- Paddy Kenny (Wanderers)
- Paul Collins (Highfield)
