= J. J. McCoy (rugby union) =

Irish international rugby union player

J.J. McCoy
- Born: James Joseph McCoy; 28 June 1958 (age 68) Enniskillen, Northern Ireland
- Occupation: Royal Ulster Constabulary officer

Rugby union career
- Position: Prop Forward
Senior career
| Years | Team | Apps | (Points) |
| 197x–1985 | Dungannon | | |
| 1985–199x | Bangor | | |
Provincial / State sides
| Years | Team | Apps | (Points) |
| 1978–199x | Ulster | | |
International career
| Years | Team | Apps | (Points) |
| 1979 | Ireland U23 | 1 | (0) |
| 1979–1982 | Ireland B | 2 | (0) |
| 1984–1989 | Ireland | 16 | (0) |

James Joseph McCoy (born 28 June 1958), also referred to as J.J. McCoy or Jimmy McCoy, is a former Ireland rugby union international. A tighthead prop, he was a member of the Ireland team that won the 1985 Five Nations Championship and the Triple Crown. He also represented Ireland at the 1987 Rugby World Cup. While playing for Ireland, McCoy was a serving Royal Ulster Constabulary officer.

== Playing career ==
=== Clubs and province ===
McCoy played rugby union at senior club level for Dungannon and Bangor. He also played for Ulster in the IRFU Interprovincial Championship, making his debut against Munster at Ravenhill in 1978 aged 19. On 14 November 1984 McCoy was a member of an Ulster team that defeated a touring Australia 15–13 at Ravenhill.

=== Ireland ===
Between 1984 and 1989 McCoy made 16 full senior appearances for Ireland. He had previously represented Ireland at Under-23 and B levels. He made his senior debut on 4 February 1984 against Wales in an 18–9 defeat. He was a member of the Ireland team that won 1985 Five Nations Championship and the Triple Crown. He also represented Ireland at the 1987 Rugby World Cup. McCoy made his final appearance for Ireland on 18 November 1989 against New Zealand.

| | Appearances |
|---|---|
| 1984 Five Nations Championship | 1 |
| 1984 Australia | 1 |
| 1985 Five Nations Championship | 4 |
| 1985 Japan | (2) ^{(Note 1)} |
| 1985 Fiji | (1) ^{(Note 1)} |
| 1986 Five Nations Championship | 1 |
| 1987 Rugby World Cup | 1 |
| 1988 Millennium Trophy | 1 |
| 1988 France | (?) ^{(Note 1)} |
| 1988 Western Samoa | 1 |
| 1988 Italy | 1 |
| 1989 Five Nations Championship | 4 |
| 1989 North America | (2) ^{(Note 1)} |
| 1989 New Zealand | 1 |
| Total | 16 |

Notes

- ^1 The IRFU does not recognise matches played on these tours as full internationals. As a result, they are not included in final total of appearances.

== RUC officer ==
McCoy joined the Royal Ulster Constabulary on leaving school and was a serving officer during the Troubles. He initially served in Dungannon as a community officer. However he was subsequently transferred to Bangor. In a 2012 Irish Examiner interview with his former Ireland teammate, Donal Lenihan, McCoy says he was moved after the RUC received a warning of a threat to his life. McCoy denied receiving a bullet in the post from the IRA. When travelling to Dublin to play for Ireland, McCoy was escorted by Garda Síochána Special Branch officers.

== Honours ==
Ireland

- Five Nations Championship
  - Winners: 1985
- Triple Crown
  - Winners: 1985

Ulster

- IRFU Interprovincial Championship
  - Winners: ???
