= Rab Brady =

Ireland international rugby union player

Rugby union career
- Position: Scrum-half
International career
Years	Team	Apps	(Points)
1985	Ireland	1	(0)

Rab Brady is a former Irish international rugby union player from Northern Ireland

A scrum-half, Brady played his club rugby for Ballyclare, Ballymena and Queen's University, and provincial rugby for Ulster. He was the man-of-the-match in Ulster's 1984 win over the touring Wallabies at Ravenhill.

Brady earned several Ireland call ups, but as an understudy to Michael Bradley would only take the field once, on their 1985 tour of Japan, for which he was retrospectively awarded a cap in 2023.

== See also ==
- List of Ireland national rugby union players
