= Paddy Kenny (rugby union) =

Irish rugby union player

- Full name: Padraig Kenny
- Born: 28 April 1960 (age 66) Philippines
- School: Gonzaga College

Rugby union career
- Position: Flanker
International career
Years	Team	Apps	(Points)
1992	Ireland	1	(0)

Padraig Kenny (born 28 April 1960) is an Irish former international rugby union player.

A Gonzaga College product, Kenny was an open-side flanker and played his rugby with Wanderers.

Kenny played two uncapped internationals for Ireland on the 1985 tour of Japan. He replaced an injured Denis McBride during the 1992 tour of New Zealand and won a cap in the 2nd Test at Athletic Park, Wellington. His call up had been a surprise given he had been playing 2nd XV rugby at Wanderers in the months prior.

== See also ==
- List of Ireland national rugby union players
