= History of rugby union matches between Ireland and the United States =

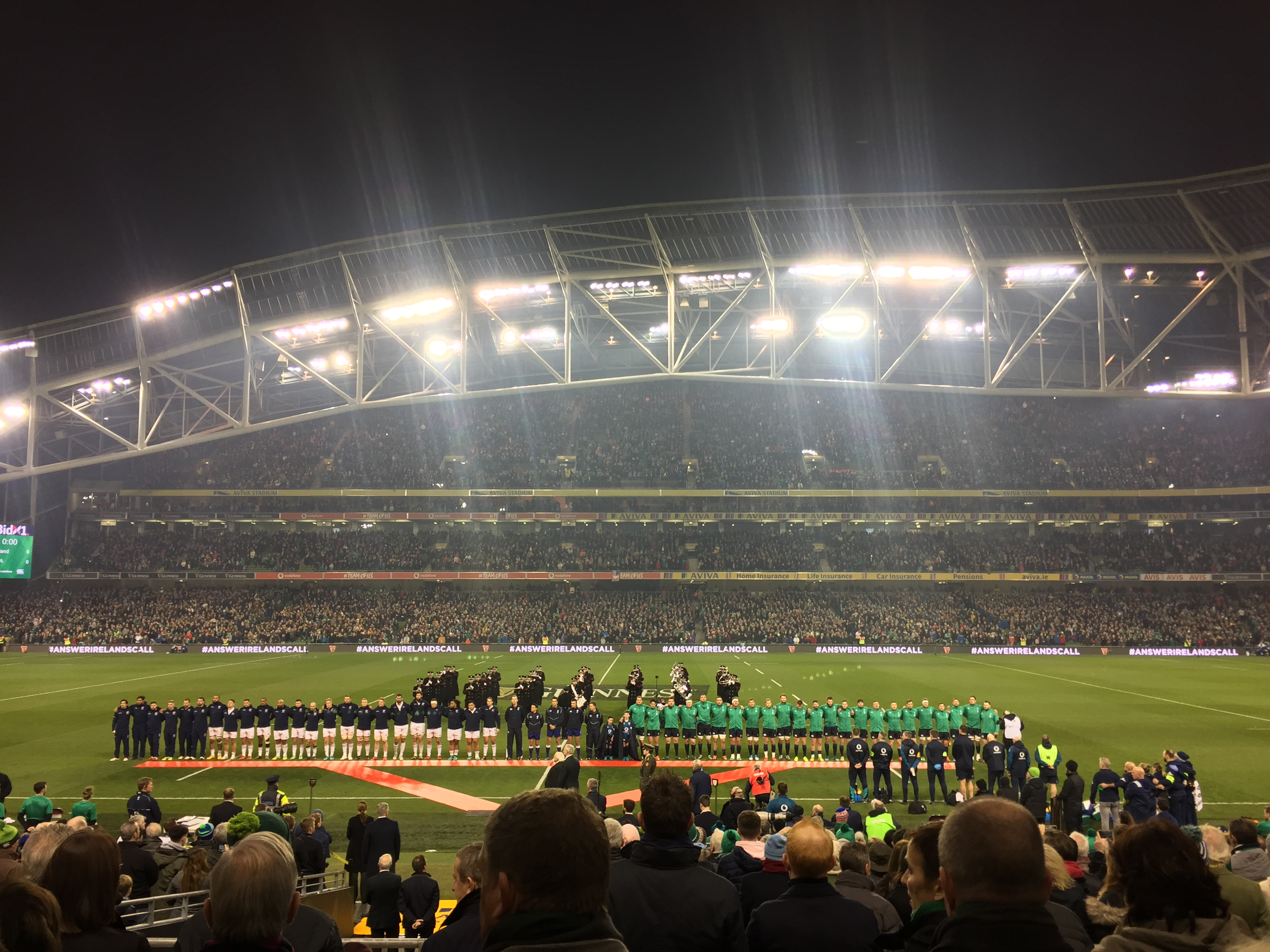
Ireland and the United States line up for the anthems prior to a test match at the Aviva Stadium in November 2018.

Ireland and United States first played each other at rugby union in 1994 with Ireland emerging victorious, 26–15 at their home ground, Lansdowne Road, in Dublin. They have played each other eleven times, five times in the United States, five times in Ireland and once at a neutral venue in New Zealand during the 2011 Rugby World Cup. Ireland and the US also played each other in the 1999 Rugby World Cup, but the fixture was played at Ireland's home ground. Ireland's 83–3 victory against the US in June 2000 was their highest score and largest winning margin against any international opponent until July 2025 when Ireland beat Portugal 7–106. Ireland have won all eleven matches played between the teams. In March 1990 an under-25 Ireland side beat at full USA side 12–10 at Thomond Park. Four days prior to competing in their first international test match, a full USA side beat an Ireland Development side 20–13 at The Sportsground on 1 November 1994.

== Summary ==
Note: Summary below reflects test results by both teams.

=== Overview ===
Details	Played	Won by Ireland	Won by United States	Drawn	Ireland points	United States points
In Ireland	5	5	0	0	262	53
In US	5	5	0	0	205	62
Neutral venue	1	1	0	0	22	10
Overall	11	11	0	0	489	125

=== Records ===
Note: Date shown in brackets indicates when the record was or last set.

Record	Ireland	United States
Longest winning streak	11 (5 November 1994–Present)	—
Largest points for
Home	71 (10 July 2021)	19 (10 June 2017)
Away	83 (10 June 2000)	15 (5 November 1994)
Neutral	22 (11 September 2011)	10 (11 September 2011)
Largest winning margin
Home	61 (10 July 2021)	—
Away	80 (10 June 2000)	—
Neutral	12 (11 September 2011)	—

=== Attendance ===
Up to date as of 16 November 2022

Total attendance*	198,750
Average attendance*†	24,844
Highest attendance	51,000; Ireland 57–14 United States; 24 November 2018
*Excludes three matches in which no attendance was reported
†Includes one match in which attendance was restricted to 6,000 due to COVID-19

== Results ==
No.	Date	Venue	Score	Winner	Competition	Attendance	Report
1	5 November 1994	Lansdowne Road, Dublin	26–15	Ireland			
2	6 January 1996	Life College, Marietta, Georgia	18–25	Ireland			
3	2 October 1999	Lansdowne Road, Dublin	53–8	Ireland	1999 Rugby World Cup	30,000	
4	10 June 2000	Singer Family Park, Manchester, New Hampshire	3–83	Ireland	2000 Ireland tour		
5	20 November 2004	Lansdowne Road, Dublin	55–6	Ireland	2004 November Tests	38,376	
6	31 May 2009	Buck Shaw Stadium, Santa Clara, California	10–27	Ireland	2009 Ireland tour	10,000	
7	11 September 2011	Stadium Taranaki, New Plymouth, New Zealand	22–10	Ireland	2011 Rugby World Cup	20,823	
8	7 June 2013	BBVA Compass Stadium, Houston	12–15	Ireland	2013 Ireland tour	20,181	
9	10 June 2017	Red Bull Arena, New Jersey	19–55	Ireland	2017 Ireland tour	22,370	
10	24 November 2018	Aviva Stadium, Dublin	57–14	Ireland	2018 November Tests	51,000	
11	10 July 2021	Aviva Stadium, Dublin	71–10	Ireland	2021 July Tests	6,000	

== XV Results ==
Below is a list of matches that the United States has awarded matches test match status by virtue of awarding caps, but Ireland did not award caps.

Date	Venue	Score	Winner	Comments	Attendance	Report
9 September 1989	Downing Stadium, Randalls and Wards Islands, New York City, United States	7–32	Ireland	Not classed as a full international by Ireland who fielded an Ireland XV		
