= John Sexton (rugby union) =

Irish rugby union player (born 1963)

John Francis Sexton (born Dublin, 27 June 1963) is a former rugby union player who played for Dublin University, Lansdowne, Leinster and Ireland as a wing.

== International career ==
Sexton made his debut for Ireland in a home match against England on 23 April 1988, which Ireland lost 10-21, and in which he was beaten for a try by Rory Underwood.

He was selected for the 1988 tour of France in May 1988, and played in all four matches: a defeat against Côte Basque in Biarritz on the 12th, a victory against France in Auch on the 14th, a defeat against France in Lorient on 18 May 1988, and a defeat against the French Barbarians on the 22nd.

He played at home against Western Samoa on 29 October 1988, scoring the last of Ireland's eight tries in a 49-22 victory, and in the home victory against Italy on 31 December 1988. His final test cap came in the opening match of the 1989 Five Nations Championship, a home defeat to eventual champions France on 21 January 1989.

He was selected for the 1989 tour of North America, playing in the victory over British Columbia in Vancouver on 30 August, scoring a last-minute winning try against Canada in Victoria on 2 September, and playing in the victory over the United States on 9 September.
