= List of international rugby union tries by Brian O'Driscoll =

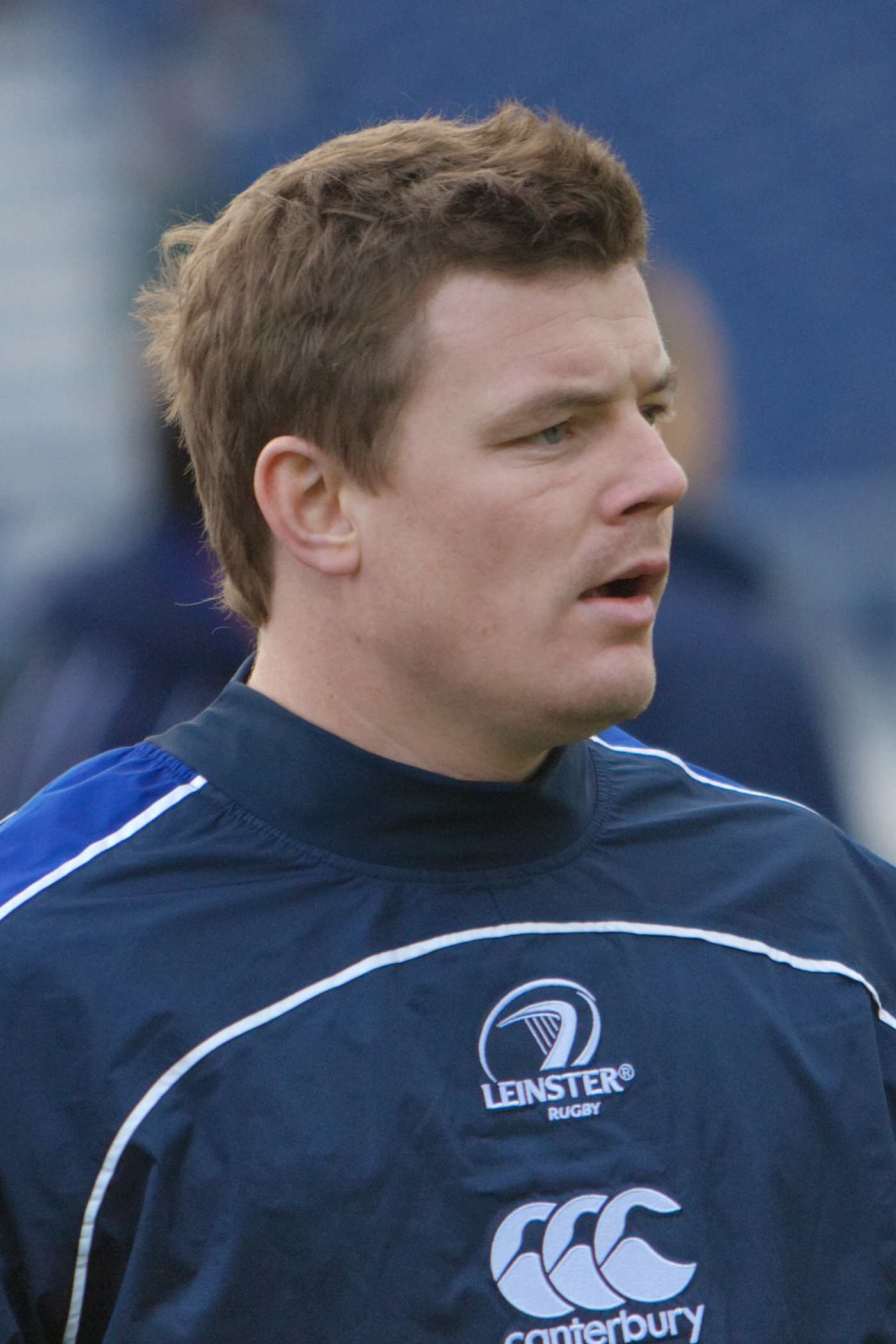
Brian O'Driscoll

Brian O'Driscoll is an Irish international rugby union player who retired at the end of the 2013–14 season. He is a former captain of Ireland and also captained the British & Irish Lions. O'Driscoll, who spent the majority of his career playing at centre, made 133 appearances for Ireland, scoring 46 tries—an Irish record. In addition to this he made eight appearances for the Lions and scored one try, which occurred during the Lions' victory over Australia on the 2001 tour. As of February 2018, and with a combined total of 47 international tries, O'Driscoll sits eighth on the all-time record list, and is also top of the all-time try-scoring list for the Six Nations with 26. In addition, he retired with 141 caps in all, which at that time was the most in the sport's history (this record has since been surpassed by Richie McCaw of New Zealand [148 caps], Sergio Parisse of Italy [142] and Alun Wyn Jones of Wales [also 142]).

O'Driscoll made his international debut on 12 June 1999 against Australia at the Ballymore Stadium in Brisbane. He scored his first try for Ireland during his fourth match, against the United States in the 1999 Rugby World Cup at Lansdowne Road. It was the first of 19 tries O'Driscoll scored there (including 2 after the venue was redeveloped as the Aviva Stadium) which, as of February 2018, is a record. O'Driscoll went on to score tries in the 2003, 2007 and 2011 Rugby World Cup tournaments. His 33rd international try earned him the IRPA Try of the Year award in 2008 for a team try scored during Ireland's 18–12 defeat against Australia. Starting from a lineout inside their own 22, Ireland caught their own kick as they moved up to the halfway line. An exchange of passes culminated with O'Driscoll receiving the ball 9 metres (10 yd) out before scoring.

O'Driscoll scored multiple tries in a single international on six occasions, included in these were two hat-tricks. The first of these was scored against France during the 2000 Six Nations and the second came against Scotland in the 2002 Six Nations. O'Driscoll, who scored tries against all of the "Tier 1" nations, was most prolific against France, scoring eight times.

== Key ==
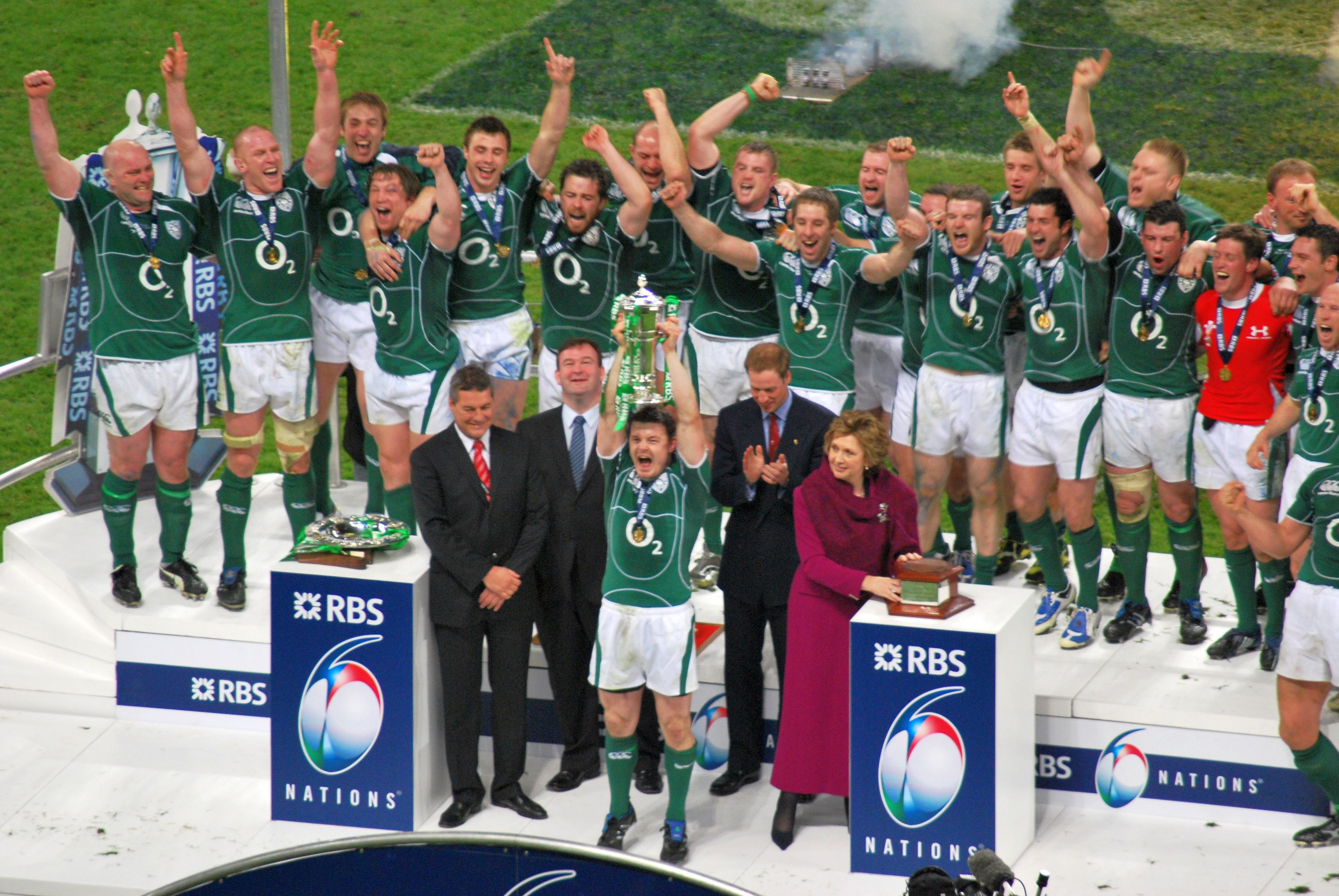
O'Driscoll lifting the Six Nations trophy in 2009 in which he scored four tries

- Won denotes that the match was won by the side O'Driscoll was playing for.
- Lost denotes that the match was lost by the side O'Driscoll was playing for.
- Drawn denotes that the match was drawn.
- * denotes the try was scored while playing for the British & Irish Lions.
- ‡ denotes the try was selected as the IRPA Try of the Year.

== International tries ==
International rugby union tries by Brian O'Driscoll
Try	Opposing team	Venue	Competition	Date	Result	Score	Ref.
1	United States	Lansdowne Road, Dublin	1999 Rugby World Cup	2 October 1999	Won	53–8	
2	Scotland	Lansdowne Road, Dublin	2000 Six Nations Championship	19 February 2000	Won	44–22	
3	Italy	Lansdowne Road, Dublin	2000 Six Nations Championship	4 March 2000	Won	60–13	
4	France	Stade de France, Saint-Denis	2000 Six Nations Championship	19 March 2000	Won	27–25	
5	France	Stade de France, Saint-Denis	2000 Six Nations Championship	19 March 2000	Won	27–25	
6	France	Stade de France, Saint-Denis	2000 Six Nations Championship	19 March 2000	Won	27–25	
7	Japan	Lansdowne Road, Dublin	Test match	11 November 2000	Won	78–9	
8	Japan	Lansdowne Road, Dublin	Test match	11 November 2000	Won	78–9	
9	France	Lansdowne Road, Dublin	2001 Six Nations Championship	17 February 2001	Won	22–15	
10*	Australia	Brisbane Cricket Ground, Brisbane	2001 British & Irish Lions tour to Australia	30 June 2001	Won	29–13	
11	Wales	Millennium Stadium, Cardiff	2001 Six Nations Championship	13 October 2001	Won	36–6	
12	Scotland	Lansdowne Road, Dublin	2002 Six Nations Championship	2 March 2002	Won	43–22	
13	Scotland	Lansdowne Road, Dublin	2002 Six Nations Championship	2 March 2002	Won	43–22	
14	Scotland	Lansdowne Road, Dublin	2002 Six Nations Championship	2 March 2002	Won	43–22	
15	Romania	Thomond Park, Limerick	Test match	7 September 2002	Won	39–8	
16	Georgia	Lansdowne Road, Dublin	2003 Rugby World Cup – European qualification	28 September 2002	Won	63–14	
17	Georgia	Lansdowne Road, Dublin	2003 Rugby World Cup – European qualification	28 September 2002	Won	63–14	
18	Fiji	Lansdowne Road, Dublin	Test match	17 November 2002	Won	64–17	
19	Italy	Stadio Flaminio, Rome	2003 Six Nations Championship	22 February 2003	Won	37–13	
20	Australia	Docklands Stadium, Melbourne	2003 Rugby World Cup	1 November 2003	Lost	16–17	
21	France	Docklands Stadium, Melbourne	2003 Rugby World Cup	9 November 2003	Lost	21–43	
22	France	Docklands Stadium, Melbourne	2003 Rugby World Cup	9 November 2003	Lost	21–43	
23	Wales	Lansdowne Road, Dublin	2004 Six Nations Championship	22 February 2004	Won	36–15	
24	Wales	Lansdowne Road, Dublin	2004 Six Nations Championship	22 February 2004	Won	36–15	
25	Italy	Lansdowne Road, Dublin	2004 Six Nations Championship	20 March 2004	Won	19–3	
26	South Africa	Newlands Stadium, Cape Town	Test match	19 June 2004	Lost	17–26	
27	England	Lansdowne Road, Dublin	2005 Six Nations Championship	27 February 2005	Won	19–13	
28	France	Lansdowne Road, Dublin	2005 Six Nations Championship	12 March 2005	Lost	19–26	
29	New Zealand	Waikato Stadium, Hamilton	Test match	10 June 2006	Lost	23–34	
30	Wales	Millennium Stadium, Cardiff	2007 Six Nations Championship	4 February 2007	Won	19–9	
31	Namibia	Stade Chaban-Delmas, Bordeaux	2007 Rugby World Cup	9 September 2007	Won	32–17	
32	Argentina	Parc des Princes, Paris	2007 Rugby World Cup	30 September 2007	Lost	15–30	
33‡	Australia	Docklands Stadium, Melbourne	Lansdowne Cup	14 June 2008	Lost	12–18	
34	France	Croke Park, Dublin	2009 Six Nations Championship	7 February 2009	Won	30–21	
35	Italy	Stadio Flaminio, Rome	2009 Six Nations Championship	15 February 2009	Won	38–9	
36	England	Croke Park, Dublin	2009 Six Nations Championship	28 February 2009	Won	14–13	
37	Wales	Millennium Stadium, Cardiff	2009 Six Nations Championship	21 March 2009	Won	17–15	
38	Australia	Croke Park, Dublin	Lansdowne Cup	15 November 2009	Drawn	20–20	
39	Fiji	RDS Arena, Dublin	Test match	21 November 2009	Won	41–6	
40	Scotland	Croke Park, Dublin	2010 Six Nations Championship	20 March 2010	Lost	20–23	
41	New Zealand	Yarrow Stadium, New Plymouth	Test match	12 June 2010	Lost	28–66	
42	New Zealand	Aviva Stadium, Dublin	Test match	20 November 2010	Lost	18–38	
43	Italy	Stadio Flaminio, Rome	2011 Six Nations Championship	5 February 2011	Won	13–11	
44	Wales	Millennium Stadium, Cardiff	2011 Six Nations Championship	12 March 2011	Lost	13–19	
45	England	Aviva Stadium, Dublin	2011 Six Nations Championship	19 March 2011	Won	24–8	
46	Italy	Otago Stadium, Dunedin	2011 Rugby World Cup	2 October 2011	Won	36–6	
47	Wales	Millennium Stadium, Cardiff	2013 Six Nations Championship	2 February 2013	Won	30–22	
