= RTÉ Sports Manager of the Year Award =

Irish sports award

- Awarded for: Most substantive contribution to Irish sport
- Country: Ireland
- Presented by: RTÉ Sport
- First award: 2011; 15 years ago
- Most recent winner: Willie Mullins (2024; horse racing)
- Website: Official website

The RTÉ Sports Manager of the Year Award is an award given annually as part of the RTÉ Sports Awards ceremony each December. The award is given to the manager who was considered to have made the most substantive contribution to Irish sport in that year. The award is decided by RTÉ Sport department editorial staff.

The award was introduced in 2011 in recognition of the huge effort made behind the scenes and on the sidelines. The first recipient of the award was association football manager Giovanni Trapattoni. The award has been presented to people representing a wide range of sports. The most recent award was presented in 2023 to Willie Mullins.

== Winners ==
=== By year ===
RTÉ Sports Manager of the Year Award winners
Year	Nationality	Winner	Sport	Manager of	Rationale	Note
2011	ITA	Giovanni Trapattoni	Football	Republic of Ireland men's national football team	for guiding the Republic of Ireland to Euro 2012 qualification, the team's first appearance at a major tournament in ten years.	
2012	IRL	Billy Walsh	Boxing	(Republic of Ireland) Olympic team	for guiding the Irish Olympic boxing team to four medals in total in London, including one gold.	
2013	IRL	Davy Fitzgerald	Hurling	Clare senior hurling team	for guiding the Clare senior hurling team to the All-Ireland title for the first time since 1997.	
2014	NZL	Joe Schmidt	Rugby union	(Republic of Ireland) Ireland men's national rugby union team	for guiding Ireland to RBS Six Nations glory and ending the year with a highest ever ranking of third in the world.	
2015	NIR	Michael O'Neill	Football	Northern Ireland men's national football team	for guiding Northern Ireland to win their group and qualify for Euro 2016.	
2016	IRL	Stephen Kenny	Football	(Republic of Ireland) Dundalk F.C.	for guiding his team to a third successive League of Ireland Premier Division and achieving a first-ever victory for an Irish side in the group stage of European football.	
2017	IRL	Aidan O'Brien	Horse racing	(Republic of Ireland) Ballydoyle	for setting a new world record by training 26 Group 1 winners in one calendar year.	
2018	IRL	Graham Shaw	Field hockey	(Republic of Ireland) Ireland women's national hockey team	for guiding his team to a runners-up spot at the 2018 Women's Hockey World Cup.	
2019	IRL	Jim Gavin	Gaelic football	(Republic of Ireland) Dublin men's gaelic football team	record-breaking five successive All-Ireland Championships.	
2020	IRL	John Kiely	Hurling	(Republic of Ireland) Limerick Hurling Team	for winning the 2020 Munster Senior Hurling Championship, the 2020 All-Ireland Senior Hurling Championship and the 2020 National Hurling League.	
2021	IRE	Dominic Casey	Rowing	(Republic of Ireland) Rowing Ireland	for coaching Ireland’s first ever Olympic gold medallists in rowing.	
2022	NED	Vera Pauw	Football	Republic of Ireland women's national football team	for guiding the Republic of Ireland to the 2023 FIFA Women's World Cup qualification, which was the team's first appearance at a major tournament.	
2023	ENG	Andy Farrell	Rugby Union	(Republic of Ireland) Ireland men's national rugby union team	for guiding Ireland to a Six Nations title and Grand Slam.	
2024	IRE	Willie Mullins	Horse Racing	(Republic of Ireland) Carlow	for training the Grand National winner and 9 winners at the Cheltenham Gold Cup.	
2025	IRL	Stephen Bradley	Football	(Republic of Ireland) Shamrock Rovers F.C.	for guiding his team to a first League of Ireland Premier Division and FAI Cup double since 1987 as well as qualifying for the UEFA Conference League league phase for the second time.	

=== Gallery ===
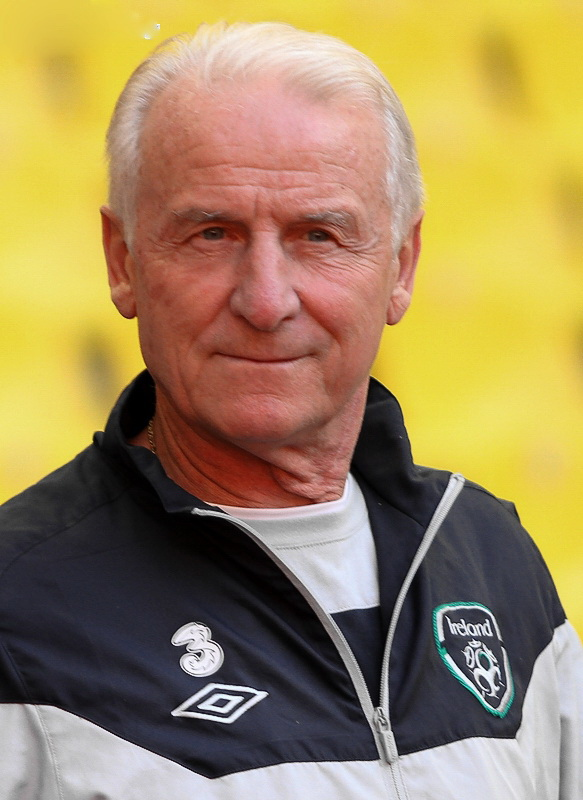
Giovanni Trapattoni, the inaugural winner in 2011

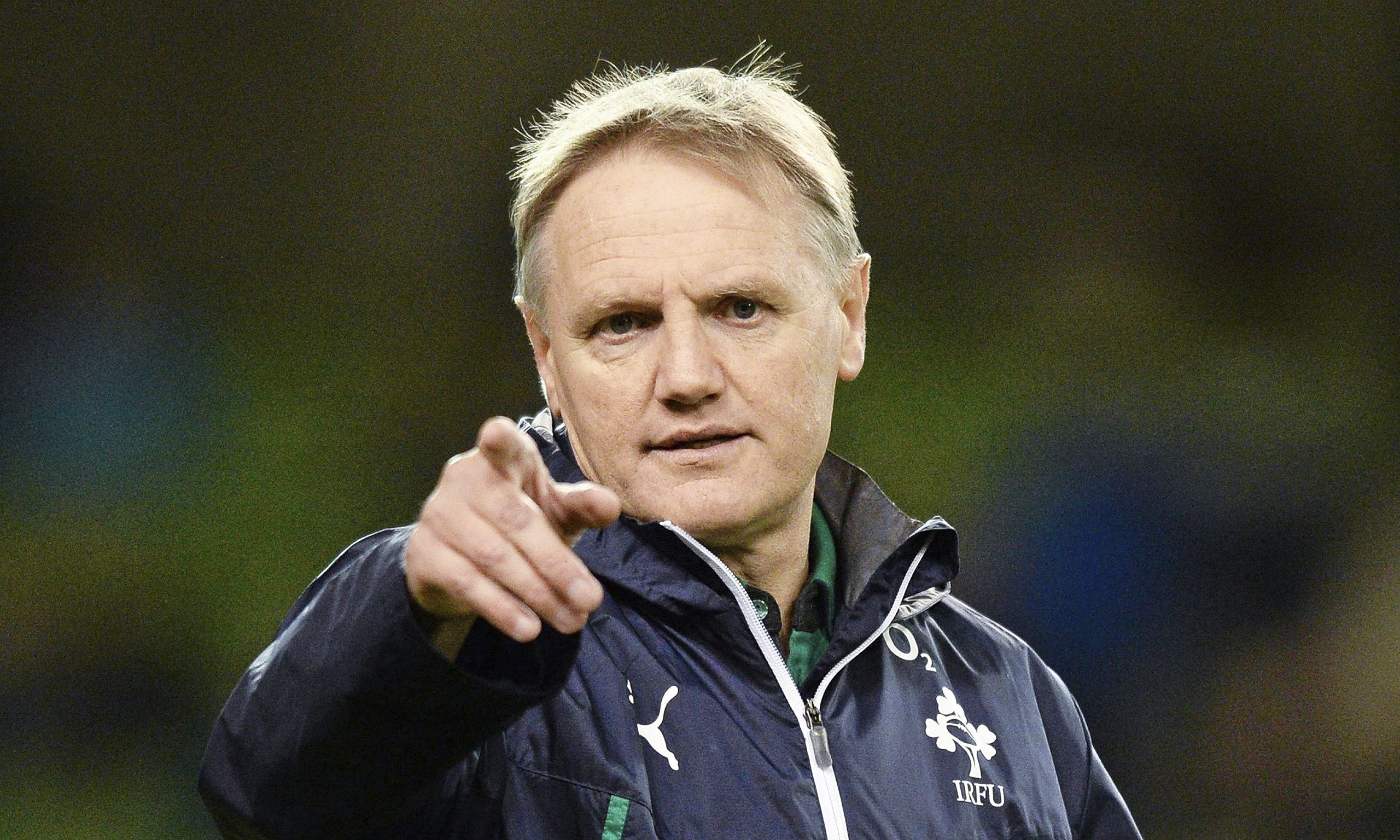
Joe Schmidt, winner in 2014

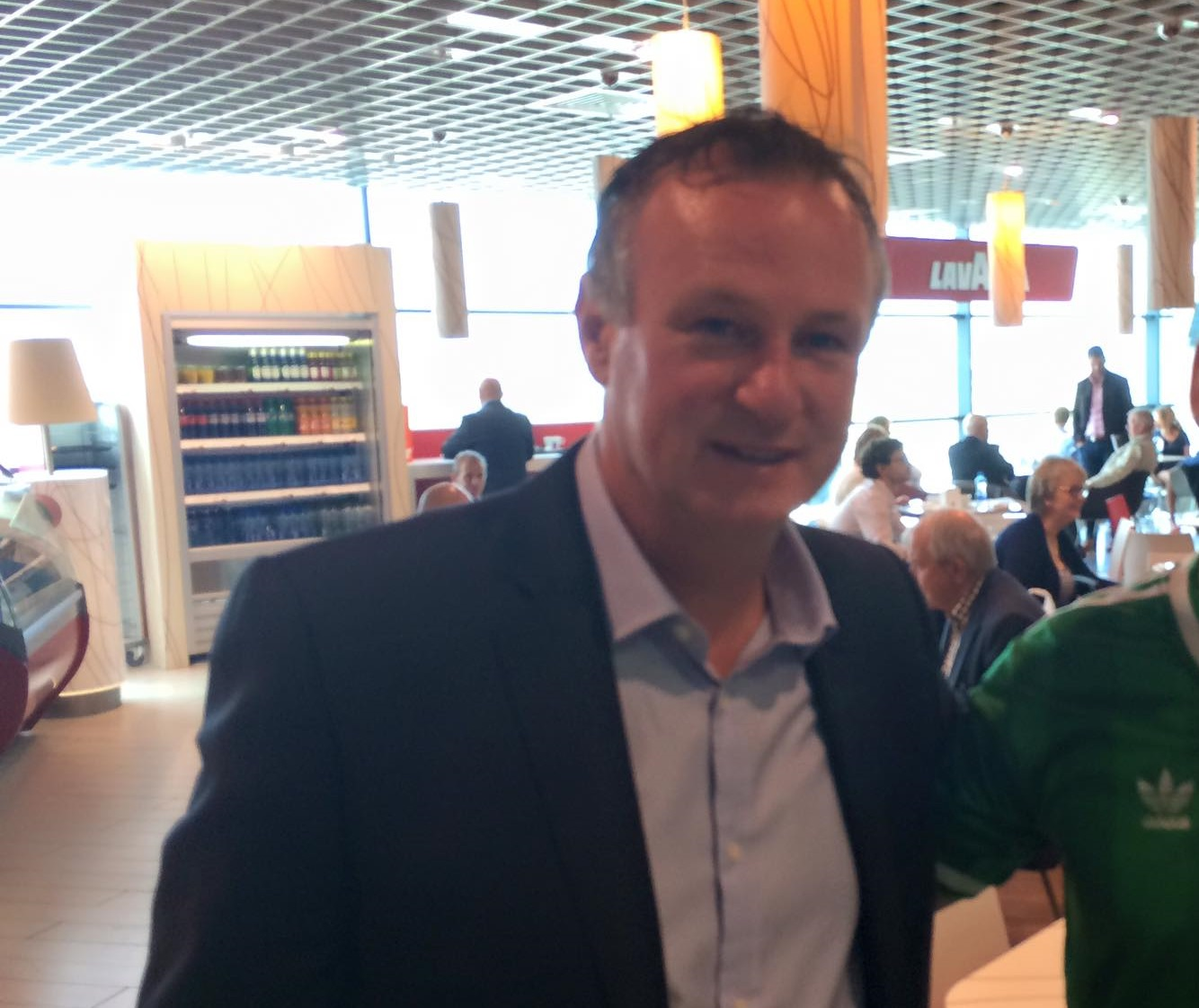
Michael O'Neill, winner in 2015

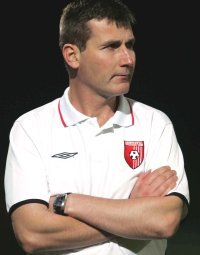
Stephen Kenny, winner in 2016

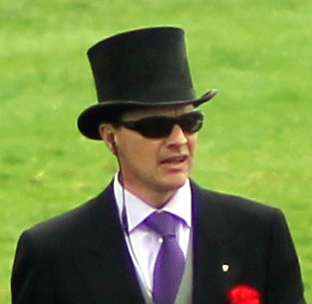
Aidan O'Brien, winner in 2017

=== By nationality ===
This table lists the total number of awards won by managers of each nationality based on the principle of jus soli.

Winners by nationality
Nationality	Number of wins
(Republic of Ireland) Ireland	10
England	1
Italy	1
Netherlands	1
New Zealand	1
Northern Ireland	1

=== By sport ===
This table lists the total number of awards won by managers' sporting profession.

Winners by sport
Sporting profession	Number of wins
Football	5
Hurling	2
Rugby union	2
Horse racing	2
Boxing	1
Gaelic football	1
Field hockey	1
Rowing	1
