= Paul Kennedy (rugby union) =

Rugby union player from Northern Ireland

- Full name: Anthony Paul Kennedy
- Born: 30 January 1957 (age 69)

Rugby union career
- Position: Prop
International career
Years	Team	Apps	(Points)
1986	Ireland	2	(0)

Anthony Paul Kennedy (born 30 January 1957) is a former Ireland rugby union international from Northern Ireland.

Kennedy attended Methodist College Belfast and captained the rugby team to success in the Ulster Schools' Cup. He went on to study at the University of Exeter and made a Combined England Universities side during this period.

While working as a marketing manager in London, Kennedy competed for the London Irish club, while also turning out for Ulster. He was capped twice for Ireland in the 1986 Five Nations, appearing against Wales and England.

== See also ==
- List of Ireland national rugby union players
