= Tom Clancy (rugby union) =

Irish rugby union player

- Full name: Thomas Patrick John Clancy
- Born: 15 March 1962 (age 64) Dublin, Ireland

Rugby union career
- Position: Prop
International career
Years	Team	Apps	(Points)
1988–89	Ireland	9	(0)

Thomas Patrick John Clancy (born 15 March 1962) is an Irish former rugby union international.

Born and raised in Dublin, Clancy was a loosehead prop who was capped in nine Test matches for Ireland across 1988 and 1989. He played club rugby for Lansdowne and represented and captained Connacht at provincial level, having earlier appeared with Leinster at u19 and u20 levels. He represented Ireland A and Ireland u25. At the time of his Ireland call up, Clancy was employed as a sales executive. During his career he toured France, New Zealand and North America with Ireland He now lives in Arklow in County Wicklow and is a published poet. Clancy is also an accomplished singer and musician.

== See also ==
- List of Ireland national rugby union players
