= John MacDonald (rugby union, born 1960) =

Irish rugby union player

John McDonald (born 9 April 1960) in Banbridge, County Down is a former Irish rugby union international player who played for the Irish national rugby union team. He played as a hooker. He played for the Ireland team from 1987 to 1990, winning 4 caps and was a member of the Ireland squad at 1987 Rugby World Cup. He made his debut in May 1987 against Canada in a 46-19 win.
