= Jim Davidson (rugby union, born 1942) =

Ireland international rugby union player and coach

Jimmy Davidson
- Born: 23 October 1942 Armagh, Northern Ireland
- Died: 27 April 2007 (aged 64)
- School: St Brendan's Sixth Form College
- Occupation(s): Rugby Union Player & Coach, PE teacher

Rugby union career
- Position: Flanker
Amateur team(s)
Years	Team	Apps	(Points)
- Bristol RFC
–	Dungannon RFC		
Provincial / State sides
Years	Team	Apps	(Points)
- Ulster
International career
Years	Team	Apps	(Points)
- England U17
- England U19
1969–1976	Ireland	6	(0)
- Correct as of 1 March 2021
Coaching career
- Years: Team
- 1983–1987: Ulster Rugby
- 1987–1990: Ireland

Jimmy Davidson (23 October 1942 – 28 April 2007) was an Irish rugby union player and coach.

Davidson managed the Irish national rugby union team from 1987 until 1990. Davidson made his Ireland debut against France at Lansdowne Road on 25 January 1969 and went on to win six caps for Ireland, his last in 1976. He took over as coach of Ulster in 1983 and guided them to three inter-provincial titles before succeeding Mick Doyle as Ireland coach in 1987. Davidson led Ireland to five victories during his three year stint with the national side. He died in 2007 of cancer.

Preceded by Mick Doyle	Irish national rugby coach 1987–1990	Succeeded by Ciaran Fitzgerald
