= Pat O'Hara (rugby union) =

Irish rugby union player

Pat O'Hara is a retired Irish rugby union wing-forward. Born in Hornchurch, Essex, on 4 August 1961, he played for Sundays Well, Cork Constitution Munster and Ireland, winning 15 caps between 1988 and 1994.

O'Hara won his first international rugby cap coming on late in the game against Western Samoa as a substitute for Ulster flanker Philip Mathews. His last was played against the US Eagles in 1994. He was known for his hard tackling and rugged style of play and was one of very few internationals of his time that came from a non-rugby playing school. He went to Bishop Ward secondary school in Dagenham where he excelled as a cross-country runner.

O'Hara moved to Ireland in 1973 and finished his schooling at Ashton Comprehensive School in Blackrock. His early years were spent with the Sundays Well rugby club where he joined the youth section as a 12-year-old. He started his rugby career as a tight head prop before moving to the open side of the scrum the following year. He was playing senior rugby with the club as a 17-year-old and won his first senior cap for Munster against Connacht in 1983 at 22. He played on many winning Munster sides but never managed to win an interprovincial medal. Some notable wins during his time with Munster included both Gloucester and Middlesex while they were current county champions and he also played against such touring sides as the All Blacks, Australia and Fiji. He played with such players as Donal Lenihan, Michael Bradley, Moss Keane, Ralph Keyes and Tony Ward, and was in the 1991 Irish world cup squad.

O'Hara had the distinction of winning the Irish rugby writers' "player of the year" award for the season 1989/1990 and won the Texaco rugby sportsperson of the year award for the same year.

He is now sales director of Architectural and Metal Systems based in Cork, a company that he helped establish in 1990.
