= Michael Bradley (rugby union, born 1962) =

Ireland international rugby union player

- Born: Michael Bradley; 17 November 1962 (age 63) Cork, Ireland

Rugby union career
- Position: Scrum-half
Amateur team(s)
Years	Team	Apps	(Points)
1980–1995	Cork Constitution		
Senior career
Years	Team	Apps	(Points)
1980–1995	Munster	40	(56)
International career
Years	Team	Apps	(Points)
1984–1995	Ireland	40	(21)
- Correct as of 8 February 2021
Coaching career
- Years: Team
- 2003–2010: Connacht
- 2008: Ireland (Interim)
- 2011–2013: Edinburgh
- 2013–2016: Georgia (Defence coach)
- 2017: CSM București
- 2017–2022: Zebre (Head coach)
- Correct as of 2 August 2017

Michael Bradley (born 17 November 1962) is a former Munster and Irish rugby union player. He is the current head coach of Italian United Rugby Championship side Zebre.

== Playing career ==
He played primarily at scrum half and was capped 40 times for Ireland, 15 times as captain, scoring 40 points in the process. He made his debut in 1984 against Australia and was a member of the 1985 Triple Crown team. His final game for Ireland was in 1995 against the New Zealand national rugby union team.

== Coaching career ==
Bradley was appointed Irish U-21 coach on a full-time capacity in 2002 by the Irish Rugby Football Union.

In 2003 Bradley was appointed head coach of Connacht Rugby as well as being appointed head coach of Ireland A, positions he held for seven years until leaving Connacht and Irish Rugby in 2010. Under Bradley Connacht Rugby secured qualification to the playoff stages of the Amlin Challenge Cup on six of his seven years in charge, reaching the semi-final on two occasions.

In early 2008, Bradley was appointed the Irish interim head coach and lead the senior international rugby team on their summer tour to New Zealand and Australia.

In 2010 to 2011, Bradley was part of the Georgian International Rugby Coaching team that completed an ENC1 Grand Slam in the 2011 ENC Championship.

In May 2011, Bradley was appointed head coach of Edinburgh on a two-year contract. Under Bradley, Edinburgh Rugby had their most successful season in their history. Edinburgh Rugby topped their ERC qualification pool (which included London Irish, Racing Metro 92 and Cardiff Blues) and reached the 2012 Heineken Cup semi final for the first time in their history after overcoming French giants Toulouse (who won the Top14 that year) in the quarter final in the Scottish capital. Edinburgh Rugby lost out to Ulster Rugby in a closely contested semi-final.

In February 2012, Bradley was appointed Scotland A coach and delivered a victory over the England Saxons in the Scottish Borders region with a winning margin of 35 points to nil. Bradley was the assistant head coach of the Georgia national rugby union team from June 2013 until 2016, working as the backs coach and team attack coach. In this period Georgia Rugby won three further ENC1 Grand Slams and achieved automatic pre qualification for the 2019 Rugby World Cup. In January 2017, he was appointed head coach of Romanian club CSM Bucuresti. Ahead of the 2017–18 Pro14 season, Bradley was appointed as the new head coach of Italian side Zebre Rugby. In only his first year in charge, Zebre Rugby achieved their best ever season results.

Zebre Rugby continued to be competitive for the proceeding 4 seasons under Bradley. In the season 2020/21 Zebre Rugby beat Benetton Treviso in both Pro-14 Christmas derby matches which gave a great lift to the Zebre Rugby club and its supporters. These victories among others were recognized by the Pro-14 when Bradley was awarded the Pro-14 Coaches Coach of the Year for the 2020/21 season. In January 2022, Bradley along with many of the top management, left Zebre Rugby after the Italian Rugby Federation announced that they were to take the club in a different direction.
