= Willie Anderson (rugby union, born 1955) =

Ireland international rugby union player (born 1955)

- Born: 3 April 1955 (age 71) Sixmilecross, County Tyrone, Northern Ireland
- Occupation: rugby union coach

Rugby union career
International career
Years	Team	Apps	(Points)
1984–1990	Ireland	27	(4)
- Correct as of 24 December 2024

Willie Anderson (born 3 April 1955) is a rugby union coach and former Ireland international player. A lock, Anderson was capped 27 times for the national side between 1984 and 1990, some of them as captain.

== Playing career ==
While on a 1980 tour in Buenos Aires, Anderson was imprisoned for three months by the Argentinian authorities after attempting to smuggle a flag from a government building. He was later cleared of "demeaning a patriotic symbol".

In one appearance as captain against New Zealand, Anderson led his side into a confrontation with their opponents while they were performing the haka.

Anderson along with his French opponent Jean Condom, unwittingly became the subject of an amusing banner spotted by TV cameras in the crowd during a 5 Nations rugby match at Lansdowne Road in Ireland's championship campaign of 1985. The banner read 'Our Willie's bigger than your Condom!'.

Anderson attended Omagh Academy. He is the father of fashion designer Jonathan Anderson (JW Anderson) who designed the Super Bowl performance outfit worn by the singer Rihanna in February 2023.

== Coaching ==
After retiring he became assistant coach of Leinster and later the Scotland national team, both under head coach Matt Williams. After a spell as a full-time physical education teacher and rugby coach at Grosvenor Grammar School and later at Sullivan Upper School, Anderson was appointed head coach of Rainey Old Boys in July 2007.

Anderson coaches Coolmine R.F.C.'s senior first XV. They play in Division 1 of the Leinster League. On 22 March 2011, Anderson led Sullivan Upper School to their second Medallion Shield Victory defeating Limavady Grammar School 17–0.
