= Ireland national rugby union team =

Ireland men's international rugby union team

Ireland
- Emblem: Shamrock with rugby ball
- Union: Irish Rugby Football Union
- Head coach: Andy Farrell
- Captain: Caelan Doris
- Most caps: Cian Healy (137)
- Top scorer: Johnny Sexton (1,108)
- Top try scorer: Brian O'Driscoll (46)
- Home stadium: Aviva Stadium
First colours	Second colours

World Rugby ranking
- Current: 3 (as of 22 February 2026)
- Highest: 1 (2019, 2022–2023, 2024)
- Lowest: 9 (2013)

First international
- England 7–0 Ireland (Kennington, England; 15 February 1875)

Biggest win
- Portugal 7–106 Ireland (Algés, Portugal; 12 July 2025)

Biggest defeat
- New Zealand 60–0 Ireland (Hamilton, New Zealand; 23 June 2012)

World Cup
- Appearances: 10 (first in 1987)
- Best result: Quarter-finals (1987, 1991, 1995, 2003, 2011, 2015, 2019, 2023)
- Website: www.irishrugby.ie/home.php

The Ireland men’s national rugby union team (Note: Irish: Foireann rugbaí náisiúnta na hÉireann) represents the island of Ireland — both the Republic of Ireland and Northern Ireland — in rugby union. Ireland competes in the annual Six Nations Championship and in the Rugby World Cup. Ireland is one of the four unions that make up the British & Irish Lions.

The Ireland national team dates to 1875, when they played their first international match against England. Ireland reached number 1 in the World Rugby Rankings for the first time in 2019; the team returned to number 1 for a second time on 18 July 2022 and did not relinquish the top spot until 2 October 2023. Twelve former Ireland players have been inducted into the World Rugby Hall of Fame.

== History ==
=== Early years: 1875–1900 ===
Dublin University was the first organised rugby football club in Ireland, having been founded in 1854. The club was organised by students who had learnt the game while at public schools in Great Britain. During the third quarter of the nineteenth century, and following the adoption of a set of official rules in 1868, rugby football began to spread quickly throughout Ireland, resulting in the formation of several other clubs that are still in existence, including NIFC (1868); Wanderers (1869); Queen's University (1869); Lansdowne (1873); Dungannon (1873); County Carlow (1873); UCC (1874); and Ballinasloe (1875) which amalgamated with Athlone to form Buccaneers.

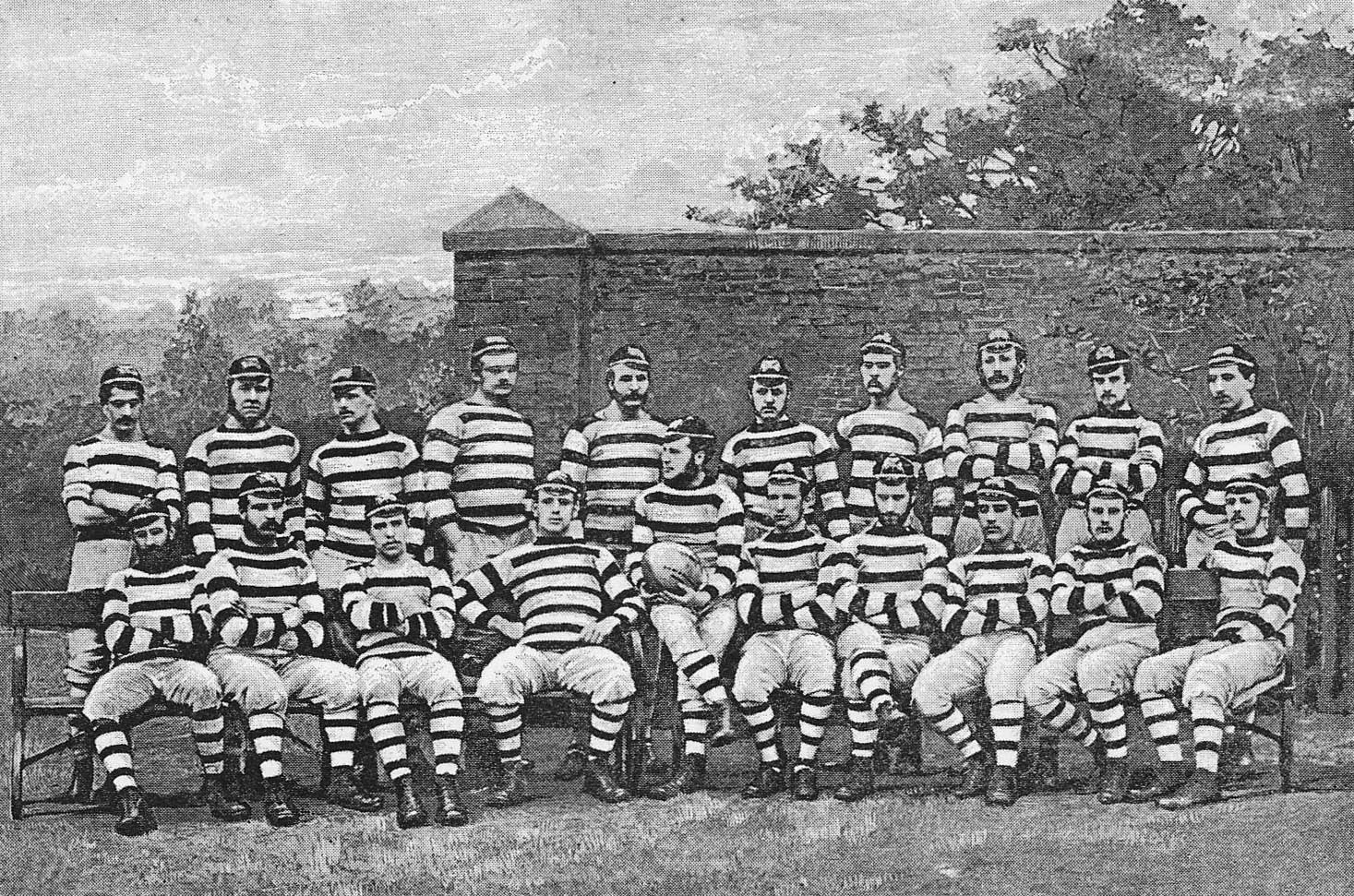
First Ireland rugby team: defeated by England on 15 February 1875 at The Oval, by two goals and a try to nil

In December 1874, the Irish Football Union was formed. Initially, there were two unions: the Irish Football Union, which had jurisdiction over clubs in Leinster, Munster and parts of Ulster and the Northern Football Union of Ireland which formed in January 1875 and controlled the Belfast area. The IRFU was formed in 1879 as an amalgamation of these two organisations, convening for the first time on 5 February 1880.

Ireland lost their first test match against England 0–7 at the Oval on 15 February 1875. Both teams fielded 20 players in this match, as was customary in the early years of rugby union; it was not until 1877 that the number of players was reduced from 20 to 15. That same year Ireland's first home match, also against England, was held at Leinster Cricket Club's Observatory Lane ground in Rathmines, as Lansdowne Road was deemed unsuitable. The first match at Lansdowne Road was held on 11 March 1878, with England beating Ireland by two goals and a try to nil.

Following a six-year period of defeats, in 1881 Ireland finally achieved their first test victory, beating Scotland at Ormeau in Belfast, following a late drop goal from John C Bagot. Ireland turned up two men short for their test in Cardiff in 1884 and had to borrow two Welsh players. Ireland's first test match victory at Lansdowne Road on 5 February 1887, was also their first win over England, with the final score of two goals to nil. On the third of March 1888, Ireland recorded their first win over Wales with a goal, a try and a drop goal to nil.

In 1894, Ireland followed the Welsh model of using seven backs instead of six for the first time. After victory over England at Blackheath, Ireland won back-to-back matches for the first time when recording their first win over Scotland on 24 February 1894. Ireland went on to beat Wales in Belfast and win the Triple Crown for the first time.

In the 1890s, Rugby was primarily a game for the Protestant middle class; the only Catholic in Edmund Forrest's 1894 team was Thomas Crean. Of the eighteen players used in the three games, thirteen were from three Dublin clubs – Wanderers, Dublin University and Bective Rangers – and the remaining five were from Ulster. They went on to win the Home international championship twice more before the century was out (1896 and 1899), so that by 1901 all four of the Home Unions had tasted success at a game that was growing in popularity with players and spectators.

=== Early 20th century: 1901–45 ===
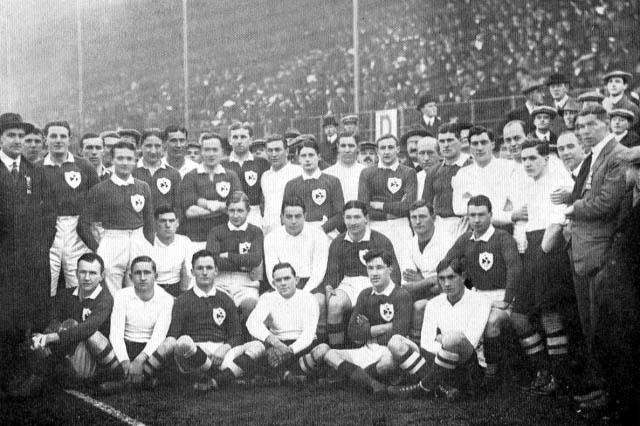
South Africa and Ireland teams posing together at their 1912 test at Lansdowne Road.

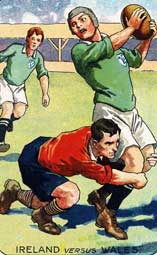
1920 illustration of the Ireland versus Wales match

Such was the level of interest in the visit of the first New Zealand team to Dublin in November 1905 that the IRFU made the match the first all-ticket rugby international in history. Ireland played only seven forwards, copying the then New Zealand method of playing a "rover". The game ended New Zealand 15 Ireland 0.

On 20 March 1909, Ireland played France for the first time, beating them 19–8. This was Ireland's biggest victory in international rugby at that time, their highest points tally and a record five tries. 30 November 1912 was the first time the Springboks met Ireland at Lansdowne Road, the 1906 tour game having been played at Ravenhill. Ireland with seven new caps were overwhelmed by a record margin of 38–0, still a record loss to South Africa who scored 10 tries. In 1926, Ireland went into their final Five Nations match unbeaten and with the Grand Slam at stake lost to Wales in Swansea. Ireland again came close to a grand slam in 1927 when their sole loss was an 8–6 defeat by England.

=== Post-war: 1945–70 ===
In 1948, Ireland clinched their first Grand Slam in the Five Nations. Ireland were champions and Triple Crown winners again in 1949. In 1951, Ireland were once more crowned Five Nations champions. 1952 saw only Ireland's second overseas tour, the first for over half a century – as they headed to Argentina for a nine-match trip. The tour included two test matches, their Test record being won one, drawn one. In total, out of the nine matches played, the Irish side was only defeated once by Club Pucará.

On 27 February 1954, Ireland played Scotland at Ravenhill in Belfast. The 11 Republic-based players protested against "God Save the Queen", and an abbreviated anthem known as "the Salute" was instead played. Ireland beat Scotland 6–0, and did not play in Northern Ireland again until 2007.

In 1958, Ireland beat Australia 9–6 in Dublin, the first time a major touring team had been defeated.

In the 1958–59 season Ireland came second in the Five Nations beating both Scotland and France who had already won the series.

Ireland managed just three victories in the Five Nations Championship during the early 1960s: against England in 1961, Wales in 1963 and England again in 1964. 1965 saw an improvement as Ireland beat England and Scotland.

On 10 April 1965 at Lansdowne Road Ireland recorded their first ever win over South Africa. In January 1967 Ireland again beat Australia in Dublin, 15–8. Ireland became the first of the home nations to win in the Southern Hemisphere and the first of the Five Nations sides to win in Australia, when they beat Australia 5–11, in Sydney in May 1967. On 26 October 1968, Ireland made it four successive wins over the Wallabies. In 1969, Ireland claimed a 17–9 victory over France in the Five Nations, a first victory over Les Bleus in 11 years. In the autumn of 1969, the Irish Rugby Football Union appointed a coach for the national team for the first time, the role went to Ronnie Dawson.

=== Later 20th century: 1970–94 ===
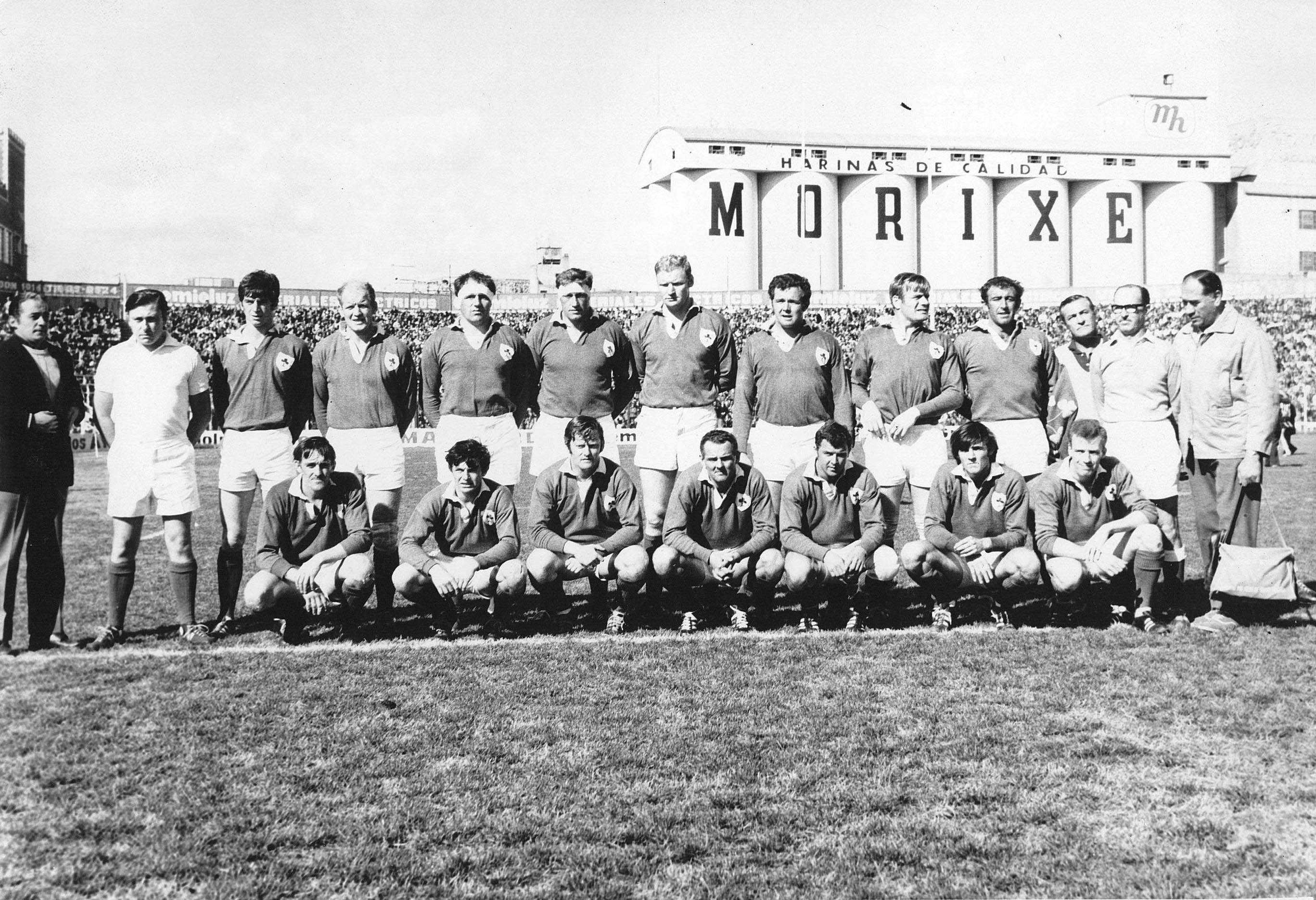
The Ireland team that played Argentina at Ferro Carril Oeste in 1970

The 1972 Five Nations Championship was not completed when Scotland and Wales refused to play in Ireland following threatening letters to players, purportedly from the IRA. The championship remained unresolved with Wales and Ireland unbeaten. In 1973, despite similar threats, England fulfilled their fixture and were given a five-minute standing ovation. Ireland won 18–9. Ireland came close to a first win over the All Blacks on 20 January 1973, but drew 10–10. In 1974, Ireland won their first Five Nations Championship since 1951.

Syd Millar succeeded Ronnie Dawson in July 1972 as Ireland coach. Roly Meates succeeded Millar in July 1975. Meates was sacked in 1977 after winning only one match in two seasons; Noel Murphy was appointed his successor. Tom Kiernan succeeded Murphy in 1980.

The decision to play two tests in apartheid-era South Africa in May 1981 led to boycotts of Irish athletes in other codes, and was not supported by the Irish government. Several prominent players refused to participate in the tour, while others were refused leave by their employers for the tour. In 1982, Ireland, led by out-half Ollie Campbell, won the Five Nations and their first Triple Crown in 33 years. Three years later in 1985, Ireland won the Five Nations and the Triple Crown again. It was Ireland's last silverware until 2004.

Kiernan retired as coach in 1983. Willie John McBride was appointed to succeed him, until he was dismissed in July 1984. He was succeeded by Mick Doyle, who led them a championship and Triple Crown in the 1985 Five Nations.

Ireland scored 10 tries against Romania in a 60–0 win on 1 November 1986, the biggest win by a Tier One country in international rugby at the time. At the inaugural 1987 Rugby World Cup, victories over Tonga and Canada saw Ireland through to the quarter-finals, where they were beaten 33–15 by joint hosts Australia.

Ireland failed to win the Five Nations in the whole of the 1990s, never finishing outside the bottom two. In 1991, they lost their test series against Namibia. At the second Rugby World Cup in 1991, after wins over Japan and Zimbabwe, Ireland lost 15–24 at Murrayfield. Ireland played the Wallabies at Lansdowne Road in the quarter-finals and appeared to be on the verge of a shock victory over Australia, when Michael Lynagh scored the winning try to clinch a 19–18 win for Australia. At the 1994 Five Nations Championship, Ireland beat England at Twickenham.

=== Professional era and new stadium: 1995–2013 ===
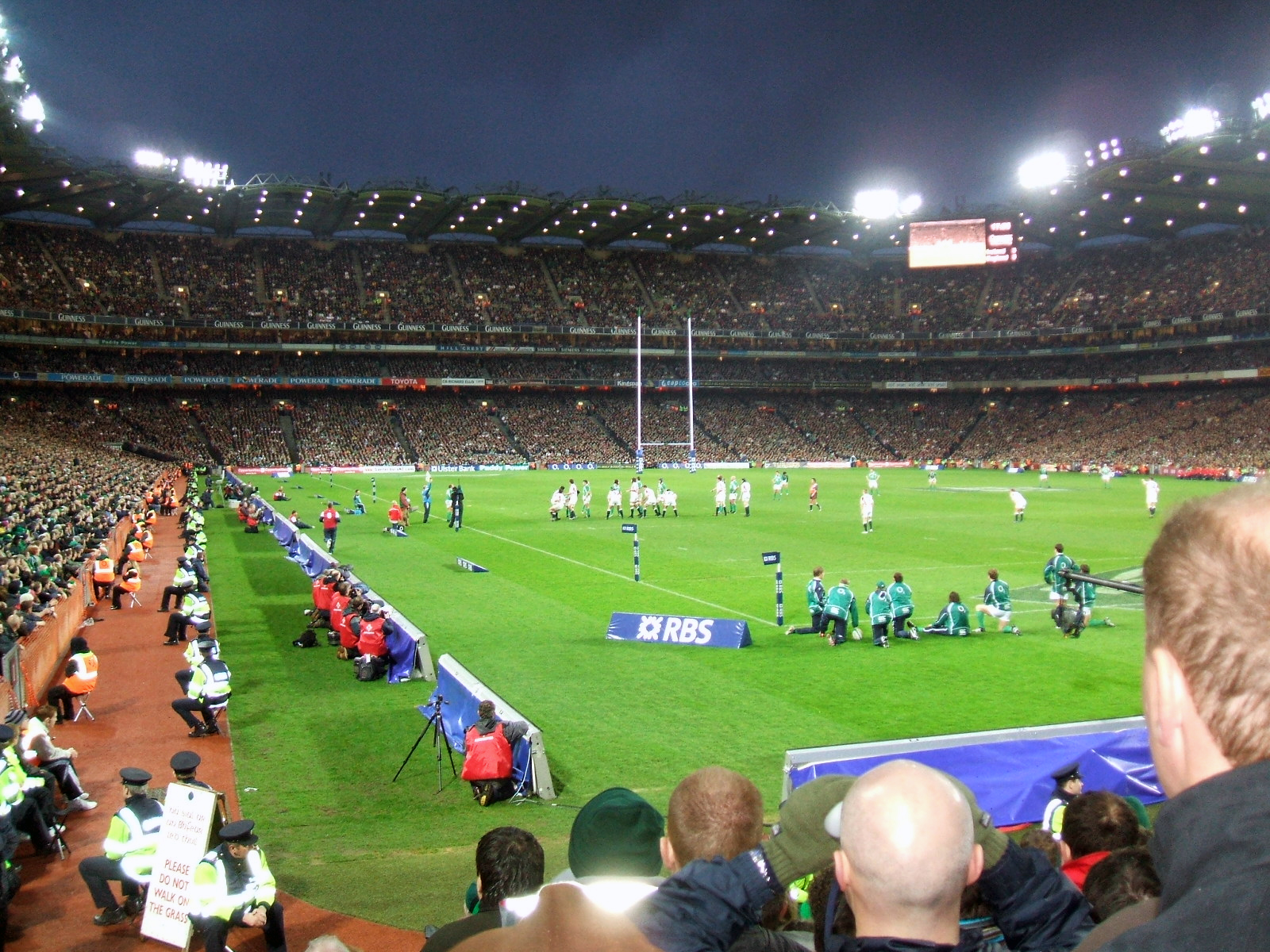
Ireland playing at Croke Park

At the 1995 World Cup, Ireland came through their group to make their third consecutive quarter-final appearance. France proved too strong, with Ireland going down 12–36 in the quarter-finals.

The start of the professional era was disappointing for Ireland, who finished bottom of the Five Nations Championship three years in succession (1996, 1997 and 1998) and lost to Italy three times, at home (29–37) and abroad (12–22 and 22–37). Warren Gatland took over as coach in 1998, but was unable to produce immediate success. The 1999 World Cup was staged primarily in Wales, though Ireland played all their pool games in Dublin. In a play-off, Ireland were beaten 28–24 by Argentina, marking the first time that Ireland failed to reach the quarter-finals.

From this nadir, however, Irish rugby improved. Following a surprise triumph for Ulster Rugby in the 1999 Heineken Cup, the first side from outside France and England to win the competition, the Irish Rugby Football Union converted the four representative provincial sides into de facto club sides, and the formation in 2001 of the Celtic League (now called the United Rugby Championship) provided Irish provincial sides with regular competitive rugby. The move to provincial professionalism was a significant success both on the field and commercially, relying on strong provincial identities long recognised in Irish sport both inside and outside rugby union, and leading to significant club success domestically and on the European stage.

The advent of the new Six Nations format coincided with this Irish resurgence. In 2000, Ireland defeated France in Paris for the first time in decades, inspired by a hat-trick from 'wunderkind' Brian O'Driscoll, and in 2001, Ireland finished second overall. Eddie O'Sullivan took over as coach in November 2001 after Warren Gatland was sacked. The 2003 Six Nations Championship saw Ireland lose to England in the Grand Slam decider at Lansdowne Road, ending a home unbeaten run that stretched to 10 tests since September 2002.

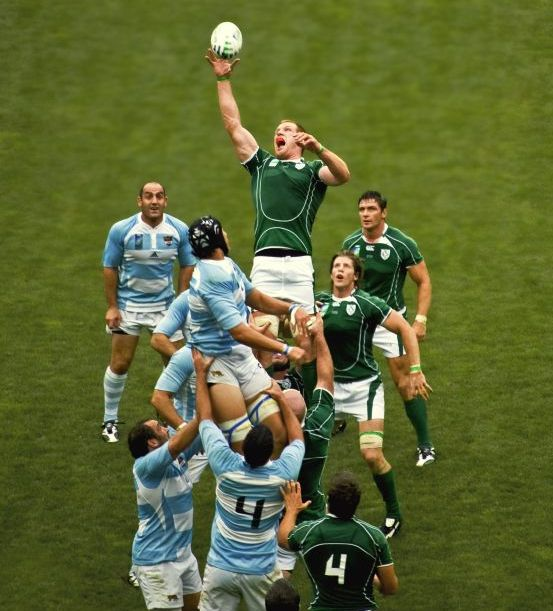
Paul O'Connell winning the line-out against Argentina in 2007

In the 2004 Six Nations, Ireland finished second overall and won the Triple Crown. In the 2005 Six Nations, Ireland finished in third place.

In the 2006 Six Nations, Ireland won the Triple Crown for the second time in three years. In the last autumn international at Lansdowne Road, Ireland beat Australia 21–6.

With the rebuilding of Lansdowne Road, a new venue was required. Croke Park, home of the Gaelic Athletic Association, hosted some games from 2007 to 2010. Ireland's 2008 Six Nations campaign included three losses. Eddie O'Sullivan resigned as Ireland coach and Declan Kidney was appointed.

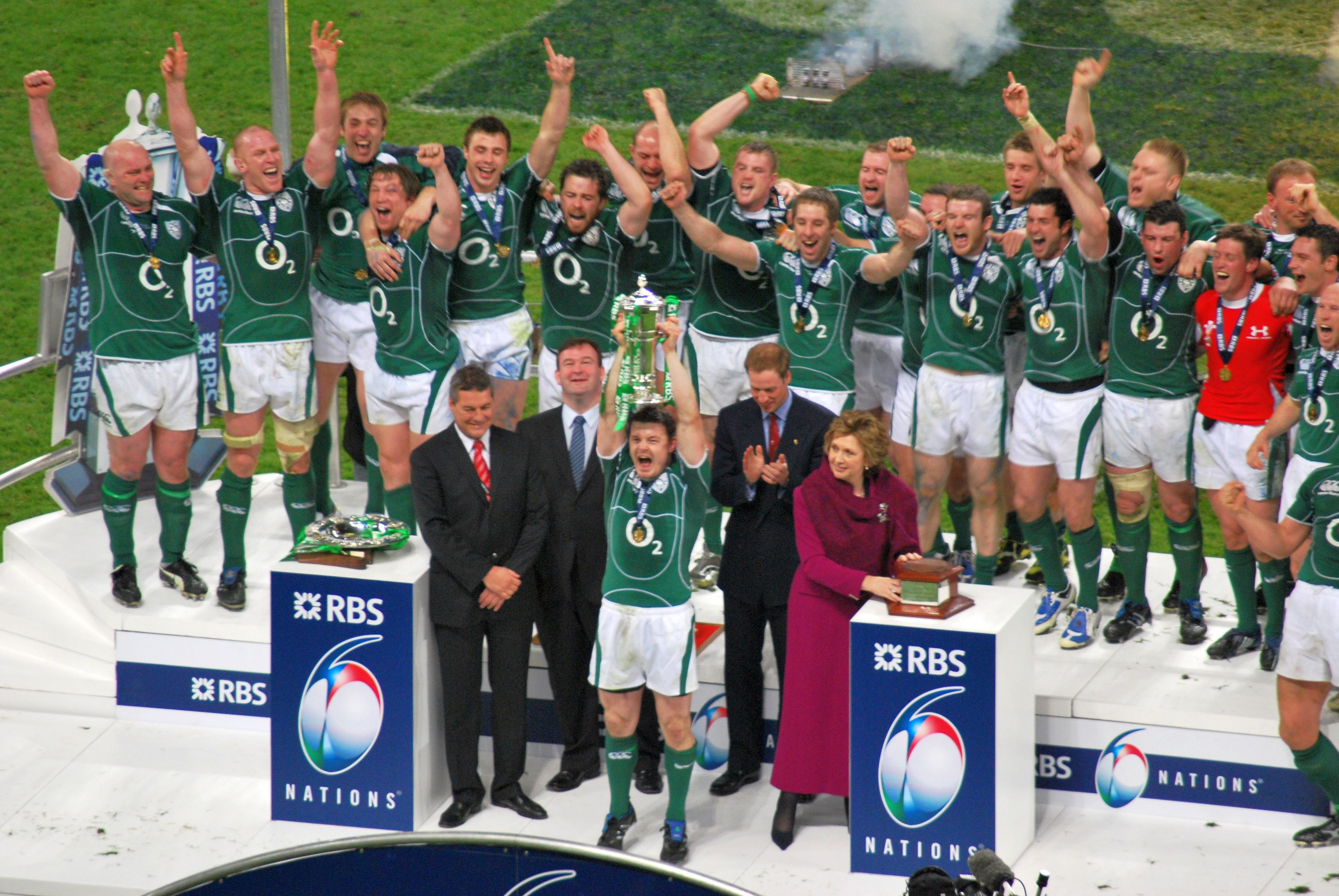
Brian O'Driscoll lifts the 2009 Six Nations Grand slam trophy.

Ireland won the 2009 Six Nations Championship and Grand Slam, their first Six Nations win since 1985 and their first Grand Slam since 1948. After a draw against Australia and victories against Fiji and South Africa, Ireland ended 2009 unbeaten.

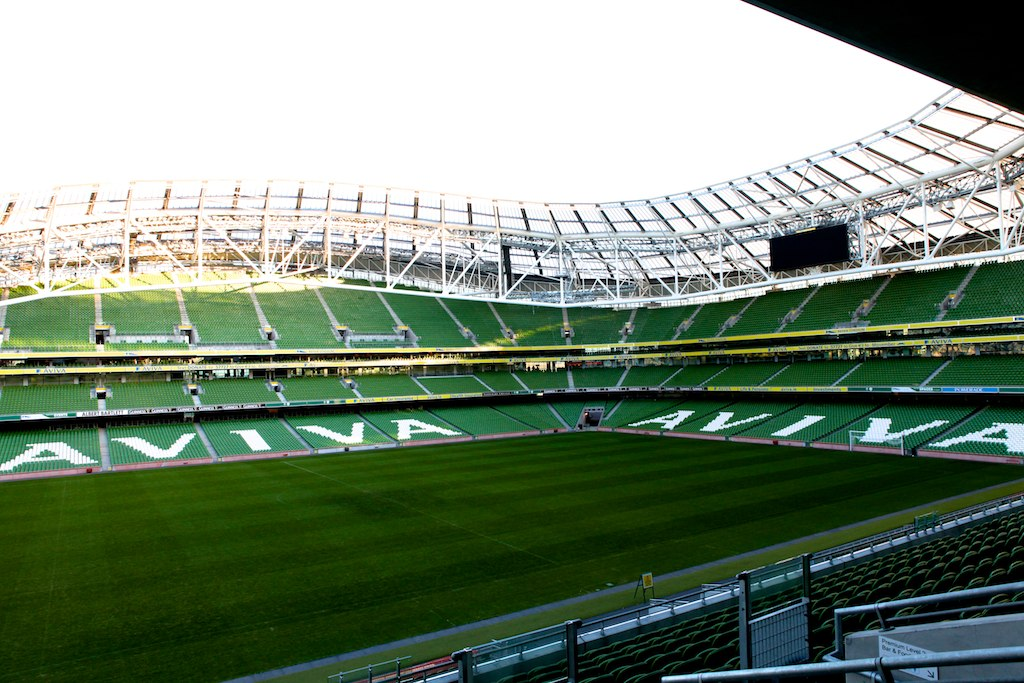
The Aviva Stadium

In Ireland's final game of the 2010 Six Nations, and the last-ever game at Croke Park, Ireland lost to Scotland 20–23 and failed to win the Triple Crown. Ireland began their 2010 Autumn Tests with a 21–23 loss to South Africa, the first international at the new Aviva Stadium.

In the 2011 Six Nations Championship, Ireland lost 22–25 to France in the first Six Nations match to be played at the Aviva Stadium. During a 13–19 loss against Wales, Ireland's Ronan O'Gara became the first Irishman, and only the fifth player, to score 1,000 points. In Ireland's 24–8 win against England, Brian O'Driscoll scored his 25th try to set a new Six Nations record for tries scored.

In their 2012 Six Nations Championship campaign Ireland finished third overall. Ireland's 2012 summer tour of New Zealand included a 22–19 loss, followed by a 60–0 thrashing, Ireland's heaviest ever defeat.

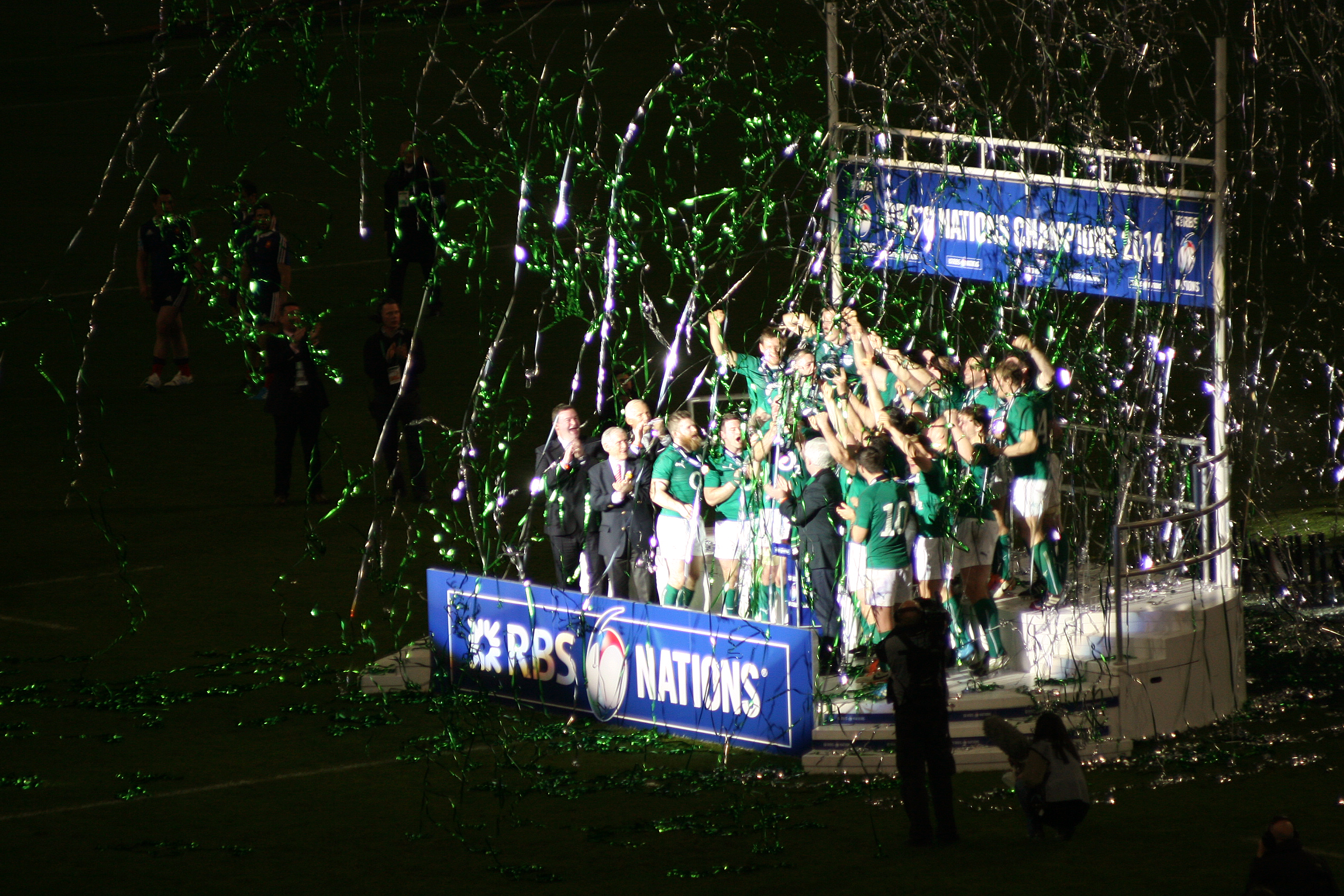
Ireland celebrate their 2014 Six Nations Championship.

The 2013 Six Nations Championship saw Ireland finish with one win, three losses, and one draw, including their first home loss to England in 10 years; and their first ever loss to Italy in the Six Nations.

=== Joe Schmidt & Andy Farrell era: 2013–present ===
The IRFU declined to extend Declan Kidney's contract, and Joe Schmidt was announced as the new Ireland coach. In their 2013 end-of-year rugby union tests, Ireland lost 22–24 to New Zealand, having led throughout the match.

Ireland opened their 2014 Six Nations Championship with wins over Scotland and Wales. Ireland lost 10–13 to England. Ireland won their next match against Italy 46–7. Ireland beat France 22–20 in the final round to claim the Six Nations title. In November they defeated South Africa 29–15 and Australia 26–23 at Dublin.

Ireland retained the 2015 Six Nations Championship, and became Six Nations Champions for the second year running on points difference. Following wins against Wales and Scotland during warm-up matches for the 2015 Rugby World Cup, Ireland briefly reached its highest-ever position of second in the World Rugby rankings. Ireland won its pool at the 2015 Rugby World Cup with a 24–9 victory over France, but lost in the quarter-finals to Argentina 20–43.

In January 2016, having been sacked by England a month earlier, Andy Farrell was appointed defence coach, replacing Les Kiss. Entering the 2016 Six Nations competition with a squad depleted by injury, Ireland won two matches in the tournament (58–15 against Italy in Round 4, and 35–25 against Scotland in Round 5), and achieved a 16–16 draw against Wales. The team went on to win the first of their three-match tour of South Africa 26–20, before losing the second and third tests 26–32 and 13–19. In autumn of 2016, Ireland defeated New Zealand for the first time ever on 5 November 2016 in Chicago, by 40–29. It had taken a wait of 111 years for Ireland to finally beat New Zealand with the first match being played in 1905. This was New Zealand's only loss all year, and ended their record-breaking win streak of 18 test matches. Despite New Zealand winning the return fixture in Dublin the following week 21–9, Ireland moved up to fourth in the world rankings.

Ireland finished second in the 2017 Six Nations Championship, behind defending champions England, who the Irish defeated in the final of round of the competition by 13–9, ending England's record-equalling run of 18 victories since 2015. They lost to Scotland 22–27 in Round 1 and Wales 9–22 in Round 4 during the same tournament. With many first-choice players selected to tour New Zealand with the British & Irish Lions, Ireland took a development squad into their summer games, which included a 55–19 win over the USA, and a 2–0 test series victory against Japan. In November 2017, Ireland moved to third in the world rankings following their biggest-ever win over South Africa, 38–3, and victories over Fiji and Argentina.

Ireland won the 2018 Six Nations Championship with a Grand Slam, and moved up to second in the world rankings. A 2–1 series win over Australia in summer that year was followed by a second victory in two years against the world number one New Zealand, by 16–9 which cemented Ireland's number two ranking and most accumulated rating points (91.17) in their history. Following their success in the Six Nations, the Australia tour and the autumn internationals, Ireland were named 2018 World Rugby Team of the Year with Joe Schmidt named World Rugby Coach of the Year.

The 2019 Six Nations started with a defeat to England, by 20–32. After this, they beat Scotland, Italy and France, but ended with a loss against Grand Slam winners Wales, by 7–25. Ireland achieved some redress when they defeated Wales back-to-back, home and away, in the 2019 Rugby World Cup warm-up matches and subsequently reached number 1 in the World Rugby Rankings for the first time, going in to the 2019 Rugby World Cup.

The 2019 Rugby World Cup ended in disappointment for Ireland, who opened their campaign with a rousing 27–3 win over Scotland, but lost their next game, a shock 12–19 defeat to tournament hosts Japan. Ireland overcame their other pool opponents Russia (35–0) and Samoa (47–5) to reach the quarter-finals, but were knocked out by New Zealand, 46–14. The loss to the All Blacks was Ireland's seventh exit at the quarter-finals of a World Cup, having never reached a semi-final, and saw their place in the world rankings fall from 1st going into the tournament to 5th by its end.

2020 was Ireland's first Six Nations campaign under former defense coach Andy Farrell, who replaced Joe Schmidt after the World Cup. The Six Nations was interrupted by the COVID-19 pandemic. Prior to the disruption, Ireland had wins against Scotland (19–12) and Wales (24–14) before losing against England 12–24. Ireland's fourth-round game against Italy was delayed until October that year, with the Irish recording a 50–17 win, going on to a 27–35 defeat against France to finish the tournament in third place. In the subsequent Autumn Nations Cup, Ireland defeated Wales (32–9) and Scotland (31–16) but were beaten by England, 7–18. Their performance in the game against Georgia, although a comfortable win on the scoreboard (23–10) was criticised for a perceived lack of spirit or tactical ingenuity. Ireland finished 2020 with their ranking unchanged, fifth in the world.

The 2021 Six Nations took place again amidst the ongoing pandemic, with spectators still excluded. In this changed environment Ireland had an indifferent campaign, once again finishing 3rd with wins over Italy (48–10), Scotland (27–24) and England (32–18), after losing their opening two matches to France (13–15) and eventual champions Wales (16–21). Ireland played most of the game against Wales down to 14 men after veteran flanker Peter O'Mahony became the first Irish player to be red carded in a Six Nations match. Ireland achieved two victories in the 2021 July tests against Japan (39–31) and the United States (71–10). Ireland finished the season with a clean sweep in the Autumn Nations series, defeating Japan (60–5), New Zealand (29–20) and Argentina (53–7).

Ireland opened their 2022 Six Nations campaign with an emphatic 29–7 victory over Wales, only to lose to France 30–24 the next week at the Stade De France. They then defeated an ill-disciplined Italy in Dublin 57–6 and got their biggest win over England at Twickenham since 1964 (15–32). On the final day of the tournament, Ireland had to win against Scotland and France had to lose against England in order for Ireland to win the Championship. Ireland won the Triple Crown on the final day of the tournament, beating Scotland 26–5 in Dublin, but failed to win the Championship after France beat England 25–13 in Saint-Denis.

After losing the opening test match of the 2022 New Zealand tour, Ireland scored their first victory against the All Blacks on New Zealand soil on 9 July 2022, their fourth win over New Zealand. Three days later, they followed up their historic win with their first victory over the Maori All Blacks in four attempts, beating the side 24–30 in Wellington. On 16 July 2022 Ireland became just the fifth touring side and first in the professional era to achieve a series win in New Zealand, beating the All Blacks 22–32 in Wellington for a 2–1 series victory. Following that victory Ireland officially became the world number one team for the second time in their history.

On 18 March 2023, Ireland won the Grand Slam for the fourth time in a 29–16 victory over England in Dublin.

In September 2023, Ireland opened their 2023 Rugby World Cup campaign with their biggest ever win at a Rugby World Cup beating Romania 82–8. Ireland subsequently won their matches against eventual champions South Africa and against Scotland 36–14 at the Stade de France. Despite their group stage success, Ireland still could not overcome the quarter-final hurdle, losing 24–28 to New Zealand. This loss also ended the side's 17 consecutive Test victories, an Irish record. Having gained 19 table points this was Ireland's most successful group stage of a World Cup campaign.

Ireland's 31–7 victory over Wales in the 2024 Six Nations tied England's record for the most consecutive Six Nations victories at 11 and also extended Ireland's longest run of home wins to 18. Ireland became back-to-back Six Nations outright champions for only the third time in their history, defeating Scotland 17–13 at home on 16 March 2024.

On 13 July 2024, Ireland defeated World Champions South Africa (24–25) with a last minute drop goal in Kings Park, Durban earning a series draw, 1-1. Following this victory Ireland regained the Raeburn Shield which they had surrendered to New Zealand after their 2023 World Cup quarter-final defeat.

On 30 November 2024, Ireland concluded their 2024 Autumn Nations Series with a 22–19 over Australia, coached by former Ireland head coach Joe Schmidt. Though Schmidt had previously coached against Ireland as an assistant with New Zealand at the 2023 Rugby World Cup, this was the first time they had faced a Schmidt-coached side in Ireland. This was also the first time Ireland had come back from an eight-point deficit at half time for eight years. Furthermore, this was recognised as the 150th anniversary game for the IRFU and marked by wearing an anniversary kit for the fixture. In addition, Cian Healy became Ireland's all-time leading appearance maker overtaking Brian O'Driscoll to make his 134th appearance. It was also the final game Andy Farrell would take charge of before his sabbatical to coach the British & Irish Lions for the 2025 tour of Australia. Assistant coach Simon Easterby would assume the head coach duties for the 2025 Six Nations and summer tour in his absence.

Ireland finished third in the 2025 Six Nations under Simon Easterby, despite winning four matches, only losing at home to France, 27–42. It was announced after the campaign that Paul O'Connell would take over as interim head coach from Simon Easterby who would be coaching with the British & Irish Lions. The first British and Irish Lions test against Australia featured a record eight Irish players in the starting 15 and 11 in the matchday 23. During Ireland's 2025 summer tour they beat Portugal 7–106, breaking Ireland's record for tries in a match and largest winning margin, which was previously their 3–83 win over the United States. They achieved this despite 17 of their players being on tour with the British and Irish Lions. During the match Jack Crowley also broke the Irish record for most conversions in a single match with twelve.

== Playing strip ==
Ireland's traditional strip consists of a green jersey, white shorts, and green socks. Their emblem consists of a shamrock and a rugby ball; a shamrock has been incorporated into the emblem since the side first played in 1874.

Between 1996 and the summer of 2002, Ireland's main shirt sponsor was Irish Permanent who became Permanent TSB after a merger, who continued to sponsor the shirt until the autumn of 2006. O2 were Ireland's main shirt sponsor from then until 2014. Three Ireland were the team sponsors up until the summer of 2016 where Vodafone then became the main sponsor.

Before 1992, Umbro supplied kit to Ireland. Nike were the suppliers between 1992 and the summer of 2000. Canterbury of New Zealand took over after the summer of 2000 and was the supplier until June 2009. In November 2009, Puma took on the supply of Ireland's playing and training kit. In January 2014, the IRFU signed a deal with Canterbury for the supply of Ireland's playing and training kit from November 2014 until 2020, which was then extended to 2024.

Period	Kit manufacturer	Shirt sponsor
1982–1985	O'Neills	No shirt sponsor
1985–1991	Adidas	No shirt sponsor
1991–1993	Umbro	No shirt sponsor
1994–1996	Nike	No shirt sponsor
1996–2000	Nike	Irish Permanent / Permanent TSB*
2000–2006	Canterbury	Irish Permanent / Permanent TSB*
2006–2009	Canterbury	O2
2009–2014	Puma	O2
2014–2016	Canterbury	3
2016–present	Canterbury	Vodafone
* Between 1996 and 2000 the company was known as Irish Permanent, before changing to Permanent TSB.

== Flags and anthems ==
Flag of the IRFU

The Irish rugby union team is one of many sporting teams that draws its players from both the Republic of Ireland and Northern Ireland, part of the United Kingdom, and as such players and supporters may identify as Irish, Northern Irish, British or some combination thereof. This has led to issues surrounding the flags and national anthems.

When Ireland international matches used to be played alternately in Belfast and Dublin, the British national anthem "God Save the King/Queen" was played before matches in Belfast and the national anthem of Ireland "Amhrán na bhFiann" was played for matches in Dublin. No anthem was played at away games. With the advent of the Rugby World Cup in 1987, anthems became more of a feature of matches. With the World Cup being hosted by Australia and New Zealand, Ireland's stance of having no away anthem began to stand out. Ireland used "The Rose of Tralee" for their match against Wales, but it was not well received and in the subsequent matches no anthem was played.

In early 1995, a new anthem, "Ireland's Call", was composed for the team, as the position of having no away anthem became unsustainable. It is played at games held anywhere in Ireland and overseas matches.

Home matches are now nearly exclusively played in Dublin, where "Amhrán na bhFiann" is played first, followed by "Ireland's Call". There has only been one match held in Belfast since 1953 - Ireland's test match against Italy in the run up to the World Cup in 2007. On this occasion, only "Ireland's Call" was played.

The debate over anthems continues to some degree, with some players and supporters arguing that "Amhrán na bhFiann" should be played overseas, while others arguing that the British National Anthem should be played before Belfast matches (when they occur). The position of the IRFU is that outside the Republic of Ireland only "Ireland's Call" is to be played.

At the 2011 Rugby World Cup, 2015 Rugby World Cup, 2019 Rugby World Cup and 2023 Rugby World Cup the Ireland team entered the field of play at the beginning of their matches with the Irish tricolour and the Flag of Ulster.

== Home grounds ==
The traditional home of Irish rugby is Lansdowne Road in Dublin, where most of Ireland's home matches were held. The stadium was rebuilt between 2007 and 2010. Naming rights were sold to an insurance company, and the venue is now referred to as the Aviva Stadium.

The original stadium, owned by the Irish Rugby Football Union, was built in 1872, and so the venue continues to hold the distinction as the oldest still in use for international rugby. In 1878 the ground hosted its first rugby Test, with Ireland playing host to the English (the first representative rugby match had taken place prior to the Test, a game between Ulster and Leinster). Lansdowne Road had a capacity of just over 49,000 before it was demolished in summer 2007. The redeveloped stadium seats 51,700 and was opened in May 2010. The final Irish Test prior to work commencing on the remodelled stadium was against the Pacific Islanders in late 2006.

With Lansdowne Road unavailable for use, Ireland was without a suitable home ground for the subsequent Six Nations. The Gaelic Athletic Association (GAA) owned Croke Park (an 82,500 capacity stadium), was made available for Ireland's two home games against France and England in 2007. It was the first time ever that rugby had been played at the venue. Croke Park remained in use for Ireland's Six Nations matches and other major Tests until the completion of the redevelopment at Lansdowne Road.

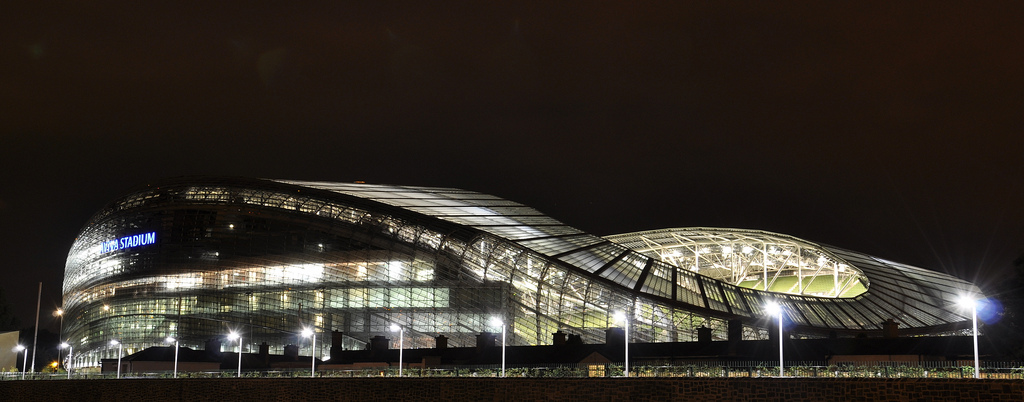
Aviva Stadium, on Lansdowne Road

The first Ireland match at the rebuilt stadium was against reigning World Cup champions South Africa on 6 November 2010. South Africa won the match 23–21. Because of the historic significance of this match, South Africa announced that they would wear their change strip to allow Ireland to wear their home green; normally, the home team change their colours in the event of a clash.

Although Ireland has never totally hosted the Rugby World Cup, select games from both the 1991 and 1999 World Cups were played throughout venues in Ireland. Pool B in 1991 was mainly played in Ireland and Scotland, with two games at Lansdowne Road (involving Ireland) and one (Zimbabwe v Japan) played at Ravenhill, Belfast. A quarter-final and a semi-final were also hosted by Dublin. A similar system was used in 1999, though in addition to Lansdowne and Ravenhill, Thomond Park was also a venue. Lansdowne Road was also the host of a quarter-final in 1999. Ireland were set to host matches at Lansdowne Road for the 2007 World Cup, but due to scheduling conflicts with the reconstruction of the stadium, they decided they were not in a position to host any.

== Performances ==
=== Overall ===
Men's World Rugby Rankings Top 20 as of 16 November 2026
Rank	Change (Note: Change from the previous week)	Team	Points
1	Steady	South Africa	91.53
2	Steady	New Zealand	90.65
3	▲1	France	89.05
4	▼1	Ireland	88.70
5	Steady	England	86.99
6	Steady	Scotland	85.28
7	Steady	Australia	82.24
8	Steady	Argentina	82.09
9	▲1	Wales	79.37
10	▼1	Fiji	77.79
11	Steady	Italy	75.84
12	Steady	Japan	75.25
13	Steady	Georgia	74.23
14	▲1	United States	68.39
15	▼1	Portugal	68.24
16	▲3	Samoa	67.60
17	▲1	Chile	67.00
18	▼2	Spain	66.53
19	▼2	Tonga	65.58
20	Steady	Uruguay	65.17

Ireland's historical rankings

Source: World Rugby
Graph updated to 16 November 2026

Below is a table of test matches played by Ireland up to 21 November 2026.

Opponent	Played	Won	Lost	Drawn	Win %	F	A	Diff
Argentina	21	15	6	0	71.43%	524	400	+124
Australia	40	17	22	1	42.5%	649	815	–166
Canada	8	7	0	1	87.5%	328	105	+223
England	144	55	81	8	38.19%	1,383	1,806	–423
Fiji	7	7	0	0	100%	302	100	+202
France	105	37	61	7	35.24%	1,352	1,757	–405
Georgia	6	6	0	0	100%	253	46	+207
Italy	39	35	4	0	89.74%	1,374	568	+806
Japan	12	11	1	0	91.67%	524	203	+321
Namibia	4	2	2	0	50%	117	65	+52
New Zealand	40	5	34	1	12.5%	563	1,130	–567
New Zealand Natives	1	0	1	0	0%	1G	4G	–3G
Pacific Islanders	1	1	0	0	100%	61	17	+44
Portugal	1	1	0	0	100%	106	7	+99
Presidents XV	1	0	0	1	0%	18	18	0
Romania	10	10	0	0	100%	472	110	+362
Russia	3	3	0	0	100%	132	15	+117
Samoa	8	7	1	0	87.5%	273	121	+152
Scotland	144	73	66	5	50.69%	1,827	1,561	+266
South Africa	32	11	20	1	34.38%	490	622	–132
Tonga	3	3	0	0	100%	131	44	+87
United States	11	11	0	0	100%	489	125	+364
Wales	137	60	70	7	43.8%	1,695	1,681	+14
Zimbabwe	1	1	0	0	100%	55	11	+44
Total	779	378	369	32	48.52%	13,118	11,327	+1,791

=== Rugby World Cup ===
Rugby World Cup record									Qualification						
Year	Round	Pld	W	D	L	PF	PA	Squad	Pos	Pld	W	D	L	PF	PA
(New Zealand) (Australia) 1987	Quarter-finals	4	2	0	2	99	74	Squad	Invited						
(England) (France) (Ireland) (Scotland) (Wales) 1991	Quarter-finals	4	2	0	2	120	70	Squad	Automatically qualified						
(South Africa) 1995	Quarter-finals	4	2	0	2	105	130	Squad	Automatically qualified						
(Wales) 1999	QF play-off	4	2	0	2	124	73	Squad	1st	2	2	0	0	123	35
(Australia) 2003	Quarter-finals	5	3	0	2	162	99	Squad	1st	2	2	0	0	98	17
(France) 2007	Pool stage	4	2	0	2	64	82	Squad	Automatically qualified						
(New Zealand) 2011	Quarter-finals	5	4	0	1	145	56	Squad	Automatically qualified						
(England) 2015	Quarter-finals	5	4	0	1	154	78	Squad	Automatically qualified						
(Japan) 2019	Quarter-finals	5	3	0	2	135	73	Squad	Automatically qualified						
(France) 2023	Quarter-finals	5	4	0	1	214	74	Squad	Automatically qualified						
(Australia) 2027	Qualified								Automatically qualified						
(United States) 2031	To be determined								To be determined						
Total	—	45	28	0	17	1322	809	—	—	4	4	0	0	221	52
Champions; Runners–up; Third place; Fourth place; Home venue

Ireland have competed at every Rugby World Cup tournament. The furthest they have progressed is the quarter-finals, which they have made eight times out of ten. They have finished top of their pool three times; in 2011, after beating pool favourite Australia, in 2015 leaving France in 2nd place, and in 2023 when they defeated the reigning world champions South Africa.

In the first tournament, held in Australia and New Zealand in 1987, Ireland finished second in their pool after a loss to Wales, before Ireland were knocked out by Australia in the quarter-final in Sydney.

In 1991 Ireland again lost one match in pool play, this time to Scotland. Ireland again met Australia in the quarter-finals, losing by one point.

In 1995 Ireland were runner-up in their pool to the New Zealand national rugby union team. Ireland were defeated by France in their quarter-final in Durban.

In 1999 Ireland finished second in their pool behind Australia, and went into the quarter-final play-offs (a system exclusive to the 1999 tournament). There they lost to Argentina, and thus, not being a quarter-finalists, Ireland were not given automatic entry into the 2003 tournament.

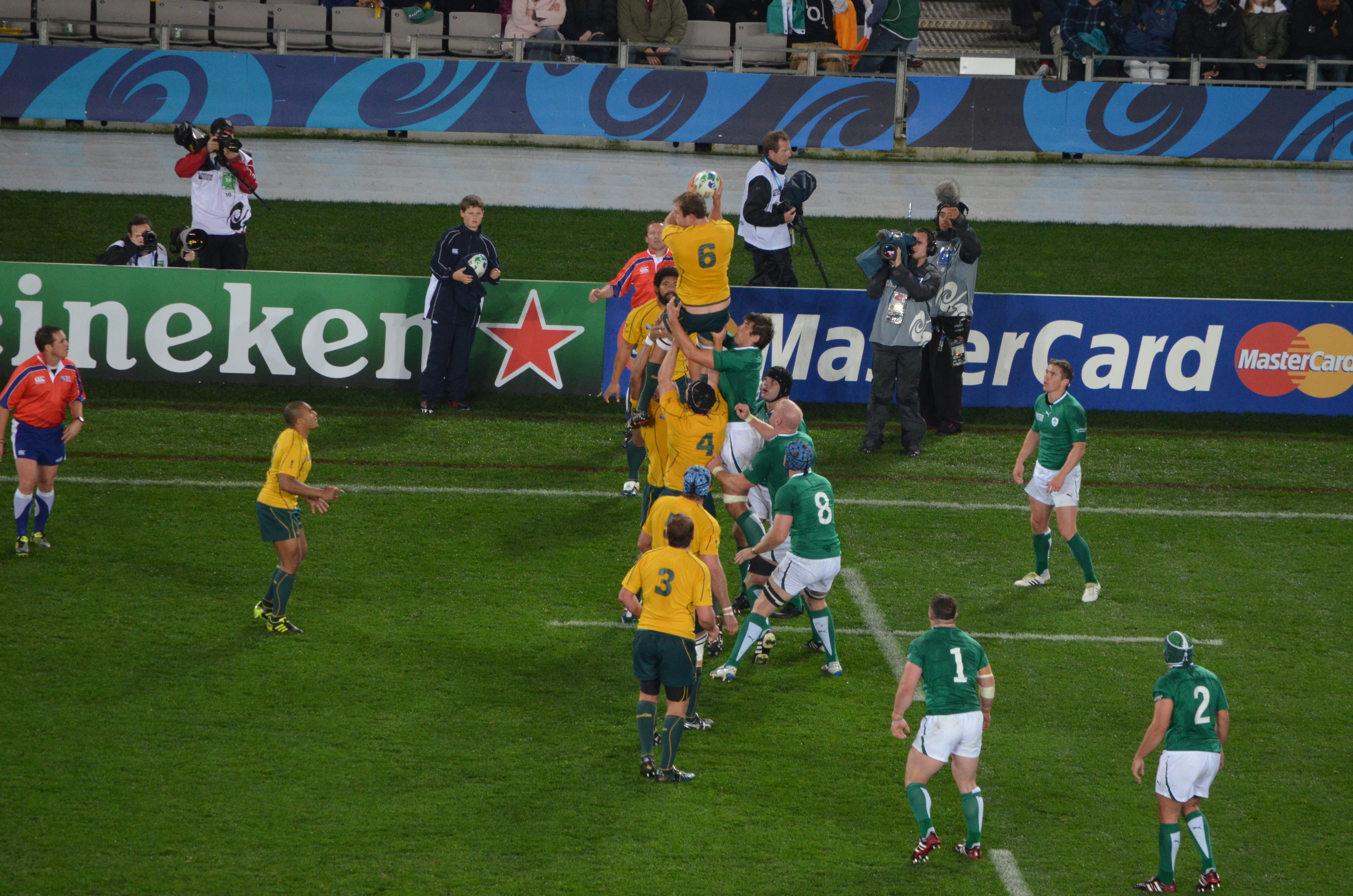
Ireland and Australia contesting a line-out in the 2011 Rugby World Cup

In qualifying matches, Ireland defeated Russia and Georgia to advance to the 2003 tournament. Ireland finished second to Australia in their pool, and were knocked out by France in the quarter-finals.

In the 2007 World Cup Ireland played in the so-called "Group of death" with hosts France, Argentina, Namibia and Georgia. Ireland defeated Namibia in their opening game 32–17. Their progress was then put into doubt when they beat Georgia 14–10, not obtaining a bonus point. Ireland lost to France 3–25. Entering their last group match against Argentina, needing four tries to secure a bonus point without allowing Argentina anything, Ireland were defeated 15–30 and crashed out at the pool stage for the first time.

Ireland were in Pool C for the 2011 Rugby World Cup with Australia, Russia, USA and Italy. Their first pool game, against the United States, ended in a 22–10 victory for Ireland. Ireland's second pool game was against Australia. Despite being underdogs, Ireland recorded their first victory over Australia at a World Cup with a 15–6 win. Ireland comfortably beat Russia 62–12 in their third pool game. Ireland secured first place in the pool with a 36–6 win over Italy, the first time that Ireland were group winners in their World Cup history. Ireland lost their quarter-final to Wales 10–22.

Ireland topped Pool D of the 2015 Rugby World Cup with four victories, two with bonus points. They kicked off their campaign with a 50–7 win over Canada. Another bonus point victory followed in front of a world record Rugby World Cup crowd of 89,267 at Wembley Stadium, when Ireland saw off Romania 44–10. Ireland then faced Italy, coming out on top 16–9, the only try coming from Keith Earls who surpassed Brian O'Driscoll as Ireland's leading Rugby World Cup try scorer with eight. The final pool game saw Ireland face France. Ireland came out 24–9 winners. The victory set up a game for Ireland against Pool C runners up Argentina. Ireland battled their opponents, but a series of mistakes spelt the end for Ireland's RWC of 2015.

Ireland qualified automatically for the 2019 Rugby World Cup in Japan. They played in pool A along with the hosts, Japan, Scotland, Russia and Samoa. They finished the pool with three wins and one loss to finish second behind Japan. They played New Zealand in the quarter-finals where they lost 46–14.

Ireland went into the 2023 Rugby World Cup as the top-ranked team and started their campaign with a bonus point 82–8 win over Romania. During their 2nd match against Tonga, Johnny Sexton became Ireland's all-time top points scorer with a try in the 1st half. Ireland beat reigning world champions South Africa and then Scotland to finish top of their group. They played New Zealand in the quarter-final for the second tournament in a row, which they lost 24–28.

=== Home Nations – Five Nations – Six Nations Championships ===
The Six Nations Championship, held every year in February and March, is Ireland's only annual tournament. It is contested against England, France, Italy, Scotland and Wales. Ireland was a member of the inaugural Home Nations in 1883, with France and Italy joining later to form the Five and Six Nations respectively. Ireland won their first championship in 1894, also winning the Triple Crown. Ireland's first Grand Slam occurred in the 1948 season and their second in the 2009 season. Ireland won their third ever Grand Slam in the 2018 Six Nations Championship with a 24–15 win over England at Twickenham on St Patrick's Day. Ireland won their fourth Grand slam and first in Dublin following their 29–16 victory over England in the 2023 Six Nations. Ireland beat Scotland on 16 March 2024, to become back-to-back Six Nations outright champions for only the third time in history, emulating the class of 1949 and 2015.

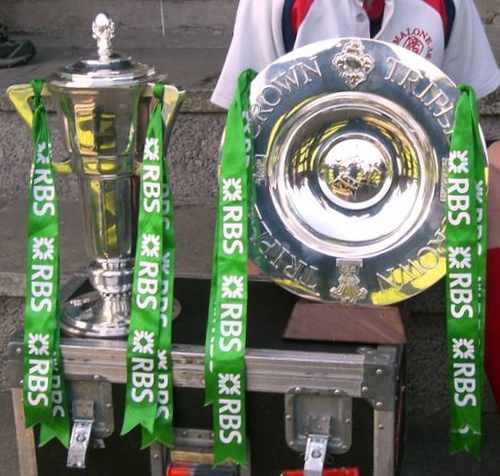
Ireland's Grand slam trophy haul in 2009

	England	France	Ireland	Italy	Scotland	Wales
Tournaments	130	97	132	27	132	132
Outright wins (shared wins)
Home Nations	5 (4)	—N/a	4 (3)	—N/a	9 (2)	7 (3)
Five Nations	17 (6)	12 (8)	6 (5)	—N/a	5 (6)	15 (8)
Six Nations	7	8	6	0	0	6
Overall	29 (10)	20 (8)	16 (8)	0 (0)	14 (8)	28 (11)
Grand Slams
Home Nations	—N/a	—N/a	—N/a	—N/a	—N/a	2
Five Nations	11	6	1	—N/a	3	6
Six Nations	2	4	3	0	0	4
Overall	13	10	4	0	3	12
Triple Crowns
Home Nations	5	—N/a	2	—N/a	7	6
Five Nations	16	—N/a	4	—N/a	3	11
Six Nations	5	—N/a	9	—N/a	0	5
Overall	26	—N/a	15	—N/a	10	22
Wooden Spoons
Home Nations	7	—N/a	10	—N/a	5	6
Five Nations	10	12	15	—N/a	15	10
Six Nations	0	1	0	18	4	4
Overall	17	13	25	18	24	20

Ireland's head-to-head record in the Home/Five/Six Nations Championship
Opponent	Played	Won	Lost	Drawn	Win %	F	A	Diff
England	130	54	69	7	41.54%	1,300	1,659	–359
France	97	34	56	7	35.05%	1,215	1,577	–362
Italy	27	26	1	0	96.3%	989	352	+637
Scotland	132	67	60	5	50.76%	1,634	1,431	+203
Wales	127	54	66	7	42.52%	1,502	1,538	–36
Total	513	235	252	26	45.81%	6,640	6,557	+83

Up to date as of 14 March 2026.

Grand Slams

- Grand Slams (4): 1948, 2009, 2018, 2023

Championships

- Six Nations Championship (16): 1894, 1896, 1899, 1935, 1948, 1949, 1951, 1974, 1982, 1985, 2009, 2014, 2015, 2018, 2023, 2024

Shared Championships

- Six Nations Championship (8): 1906, 1912, 1926, 1927, 1932, 1939, 1973, 1983

Triple Crowns

- Triple Crown (15): 1894, 1899, 1948, 1949, 1982, 1985, 2004, 2006, 2007, 2009, 2018, 2022, 2023, 2025, 2026

=== Tour record ===
Year	To	Captain	Head coach	Result	Score
1899	Canada	(Leinster) James Franks		N/A	N/A
1952	Chile & Argentina	(Leinster) Des O'Brien	GPS Hogan	Won	1–1–0
1961	South Africa	(Leinster) Ronnie Dawson	(Munster) Noel Murphy	Lost	0–1
1967	Australia	(Munster) Tom Kiernan	(Leinster) Eugene Davy	Won	1–0
1970	Argentina	(Munster) Tom Kiernan	E. Patterson	Lost	0–2
1976	New Zealand & Fiji	(Leinster) Tom Grace	K. Quilligan	Lost; Won	0–1 (New Zealand); 1–0 (Fiji)
1979	Australia	(Leinster) Fergus Slattery	J. Coffey	Won	2–0
1981	South Africa	(Leinster) Fergus Slattery	P. Madigan	Lost	0–2
1985	Japan	(Connacht) Ciaran Fitzgerald	(Ulster) Des McKibbin	Won	2–0
1988	France	(Ulster) Willie Anderson	(Ulster) Jimmy Davidson	N/A	N/A
1989	Canada & United States	(Ulster) Willie Anderson	(Ulster) Jimmy Davidson	Won; Won	1–0 (Canada); 1–0 (United States)
1991	Namibia	(Ulster) Phillip Matthews	(Connacht) Ciaran Fitzgerald	Lost	0–2
1992	New Zealand	(Munster) Phil Danaher	(Leinster) Gerry Murphy	Lost	0–2
1994	Australia	(Munster) Michael Bradley	(Leinster) Gerry Murphy	Lost	0–2
1998	South Africa	(Ulster) Paddy Johns	(New Zealand) Warren Gatland	Lost	0–2
1999	Australia	(Ulster) (Munster) Dion O'Cuinneagain	(New Zealand) Warren Gatland	Lost	0–2
2000	Argentina, United States & Canada	(Munster) Keith Wood	(New Zealand) Warren Gatland	Lost; Won; Drew	0–1 (Argentina); 1–0 (United States); 0–0 (Canada)
2002	New Zealand	(Munster) Keith Wood	(Munster) Eddie O'Sullivan	Lost	0–2
2003	Australia, Tonga & Samoa	(Ulster) David Humphreys (Leinster) Reggie Corrigan	(Munster) Eddie O'Sullivan	Lost; Won; Won	0–1 (Australia); 1–0 (Tonga); 1–0 (Samoa)
2004	South Africa	(Leinster) Brian O'Driscoll	(Munster) Eddie O'Sullivan	Lost	0–2
2005	Japan	(Ulster) David Humphreys	(Munster) Niall O'Donovan	Won	2–0
2006	New Zealand & Australia	(Leinster) Brian O'Driscoll	(Munster) Eddie O'Sullivan	Lost; Lost	0–2 (New Zealand); 0–1 (Australia)
2007	Argentina	(Ulster) Simon Best	(Munster) Eddie O'Sullivan	Lost	0–2
2008	New Zealand & Australia	(Leinster) Brian O'Driscoll	(Munster) Michael Bradley	Lost; Lost	0–1 (New Zealand); 0–1 (Australia)
2009	Canada & United States	(Ulster) Rory Best	(Munster) Declan Kidney	Won; Won	1–0 (Canada); 1–0 (United States)
2010	New Zealand & Australia	(Leinster) Brian O'Driscoll	(Munster) Declan Kidney	Lost	0–1 (New Zealand); 0–1 (Australia)
2012	New Zealand	(Leinster) Brian O'Driscoll	(Munster) Declan Kidney	Lost	0–3 (New Zealand)
2013	Canada & United States	(Munster) Peter O'Mahony	(Australia) Les Kiss	Won	1–0 (Canada); 1–0 (United States)
2014	Argentina	(Munster) Paul O'Connell	(New Zealand) Joe Schmidt	Won	2–0
2016	South Africa	(Ulster) Rory Best	(New Zealand) Joe Schmidt	Lost	1–2
2017	Japan	(Leinster) Rhys Ruddock	(New Zealand) Joe Schmidt	Won	2–0
2018	Australia	(Ulster) Rory Best	(New Zealand) Joe Schmidt	Won	2–1
2022	New Zealand	(Leinster) Johnny Sexton	(England) Andy Farrell	Won	2–1
2024	South Africa	(Munster) Peter O'Mahony	(England) Andy Farrell	Drew	1–1
2025	Georgia & Portugal	(Munster) Craig Casey	(Munster) Paul O'Connell	Won	1–0 (Georgia); 1–0 (Portugal)
2026	2026 Nations Championship	(Leinster) Dan Sheehan	(England) Andy Farrell	Won Won Lost	1-0 (Australia) 1-0 (Japan) 0–1 (New Zealand)

==== Tour victories ====
Argentina (2) - 1952, 2014

Australia (3) - 1967, 1979, 2018

Canada (3) - 1989, 2009, 2013

Chile (1) - 1952

Fiji (1) - 1976

Georgia (1) - 2025

Japan (3) - 1985, 2005, 2017

New Zealand (1) - 2022

Portugal (1) - 2025

Samoa (1) - 2003

Tonga (1) - 2003

United States (4) - 1989, 2000, 2009, 2013

==== Tour draws ====
Canada (1) - 2000

South Africa (1) - 2024

=== Rivalry trophies ===
Ireland vs Argentina: Holders - Ireland

- Admiral Brown Cup (7): 2012, 2014, 2017, 2018, 2021, 2024, 2026

Ireland vs Australia: Holders - Ireland

- Lansdowne Cup (9): 2002, 2006, 2014, 2016, 2018, 2022, 2024, 2025, 2026

Ireland vs England: Holders - Ireland

- Millennium Trophy (18): 1993, 1994, 2001, 2004, 2005, 2006, 2007, 2009, 2010, 2011, 2015, 2017, 2018, 2021, 2022, 2023, 2025, 2026

Ireland vs France: Holders - France

- Solidarity Trophy (0):

Ireland vs Scotland: Holders - Ireland

- Centenary Quaich (23): 2000, 2002, 2003, 2004, 2005, 2006, 2007, 2008, 2009, 2011, 2012, 2014, 2015, 2016, 2018, 2019, 2020, 2021, 2022, 2023, 2024, 2025, 2026

== Players ==
=== Current squad ===
On 21 October 2026, Ireland coach Andy Farrell named a 36-player squad for the Northern Hemisphere series of the 2026 Nations Championship.

On 9 November 2026, Sean Jansen withdrew from the squad due to a knee injury. David McCann and Gus McCarthy were called up in his place.

Head coach: (England) Andy Farrell

- Caps updated: 14 November 2026 (after test against Fiji)

Player	Position	Date of birth (age)	Caps	Club/province
Rónan Kelleher	Hooker	24 January 1998 (age 28)	54	(Ireland) Leinster
Gus McCarthy	Hooker	23 July 2003 (age 23)	7	(Ireland) Leinster
Dan Sheehan (c)	Hooker	17 September 1998 (age 28)	43	(Ireland) Leinster
Tom Stewart	Hooker	11 January 2001 (age 25)	8	(Ireland) Ulster
Billy Bohan	Prop	22 November 2005 (age 21)	1	(Ireland) Connacht
Tom Clarkson	Prop	22 February 2000 (age 26)	17	(Ireland) Leinster
Tadhg Furlong	Prop	14 November 1992 (age 34)	91	(Ireland) Leinster
Sam Illo	Prop	16 February 2001 (age 25)	3	(Ireland) Connacht
Tom O'Toole	Prop	23 September 1998 (age 28)	27	(Ireland) Ulster
Andrew Porter	Prop	16 January 1996 (age 30)	82	(Ireland) Leinster
Tadhg Beirne	Lock	8 January 1992 (age 34)	76	(Ireland) Munster
Joe McCarthy	Lock	26 March 2001 (age 25)	27	(Ireland) Leinster
Darragh Murray	Lock	7 April 2001 (age 25)	4	(Ireland) Connacht
James Ryan	Lock	24 July 1996 (age 30)	86	(Ireland) Leinster
Ryan Baird	Back row	26 July 1999 (age 27)	36	(Ireland) Leinster
David McCann	Back row	20 June 2000 (age 26)	0	(Ireland) Ulster
James McNabney	Back row	28 February 2003 (age 23)	1	(Ireland) Ulster
Cian Prendergast	Back row	23 February 2000 (age 26)	11	(Ireland) Connacht
Nick Timoney	Back row	1 August 1995 (age 31)	17	(Ireland) Ulster
Josh van der Flier	Back row	25 April 1993 (age 33)	84	(Ireland) Leinster
Craig Casey	Scrum-half	19 April 1999 (age 27)	32	(Ireland) Munster
Nathan Doak	Scrum-half	17 December 2001 (age 24)	2	(Ireland) Ulster
Jamison Gibson-Park	Scrum-half	23 February 1992 (age 34)	56	(Ireland) Leinster
Jamie Benson	Fly-half	23 September 2002 (age 24)	0	(Ireland) Ulster
Ciarán Frawley	Fly-half	4 December 1997 (age 28)	17	(Ireland) Connacht
Sam Prendergast	Fly-half	12 February 2003 (age 23)	20	(Ireland) Leinster
Bundee Aki	Centre	7 April 1990 (age 36)	74	(Ireland) Connacht
Robbie Henshaw	Centre	12 June 1993 (age 33)	87	(Ireland) Leinster
Stuart McCloskey	Centre	6 August 1992 (age 34)	34	(Ireland) Ulster
Garry Ringrose	Centre	26 January 1995 (age 31)	76	(Ireland) Leinster
Robert Baloucoune	Wing	19 August 1997 (age 29)	12	(Ireland) Ulster
Mack Hansen	Wing	27 March 1998 (age 28)	33	(Ireland) Connacht
Jimmy O'Brien	Wing	27 November 1996 (age 29)	14	(Ireland) Leinster
Tommy O'Brien	Wing	28 May 1998 (age 28)	10	(Ireland) Leinster
Jacob Stockdale	Wing	3 April 1996 (age 30)	43	(Ireland) Ulster
Hugo Keenan	Fullback	18 June 1996 (age 30)	50	(Ireland) Leinster
Jamie Osborne	Fullback	16 November 2001 (age 25)	19	(Ireland) Leinster

==== Recent call-ups ====
The following players were also named to a squad in the last 12 months.

Note: Flags indicate national union for the club/province as defined by World Rugby.

Player	Position	Date of birth (age)	Caps	Club/province	Last call-up
Sean Jansen	Back row	10 May 1999 (age 27)	3	(Ireland) Connacht	2026 Nations Championship – November^{INJ}
Zac Ward	Wing	11 December 1998 (age 27)	0	(Ireland) Ulster	2026 Nations Championship – July
Harry Byrne	Fly-half	22 April 1999 (age 27)	5	(Ireland) Leinster	2026 Nations Championship – July
Bryn Ward	Back row	17 July 2004 (age 22)	1	(Ireland) Ulster	2026 Nations Championship – July
Jack Conan	Back row	29 July 1992 (age 34)	62	(Ireland) Leinster	2026 Nations Championship – July
Cormac Izuchukwu	Lock	28 January 2000 (age 26)	5	(Ireland) Ulster	2026 Nations Championship – July
Jeremy Loughman	Prop	22 July 1995 (age 31)	10	(Ireland) Munster	2026 Nations Championship – July
Caelan Doris	Back row	2 April 1998 (age 28)	61	(Ireland) Leinster	2026 Nations Championship – July^{INJ}
James Lowe	Wing	8 July 1992 (age 34)	45	(Japan) Sungoliath	2026 Six Nations^{RET}
Jude Postlethwaite	Centre	3 April 2002 (age 24)	0	(Ireland) Ulster	2026 Six Nations
Tom Farrell	Centre	1 October 1993 (age 33)	3	(Ireland) Munster	2026 Six Nations
Jack Crowley	Fly-half	13 January 2000 (age 26)	35	(Ireland) Munster	2026 Six Nations
Edwin Edogbo	Lock	21 December 2002 (age 23)	1	(Ireland) Munster	2026 Six Nations
Michael Milne	Prop	5 February 1999 (age 27)	5	(Ireland) Munster	2026 Six Nations
Finlay Bealham	Prop	9 October 1991 (age 35)	57	(Ireland) Connacht	2026 Six Nations
Thomas Ahern	Lock	22 February 2000 (age 26)	2	(Ireland) Munster	2026 Six Nations^{INJ}
Jack Boyle	Prop	10 March 2002 (age 24)	4	(Ireland) Leinster	2026 Six Nations^{INJ}

^{EXT} Player was called up to extended squad only (e.g. Training Panel, Travelling Cover)
^{INJ} Player withdrew from the squad due to an injury.
^{OTH} Player withdrew from the squad for other reasons/reasons not stated.
^{RET} Player retired from the national team/professional rugby.
^{SUS} Player withdrew from the squad due to suspension.

== Individual records ==
Ten players have represented Ireland in 100 tests or more: Cian Healy (137), Brian O'Driscoll (133), Ronan O'Gara (128), Conor Murray (125), Rory Best (124), Johnny Sexton (118), Peter O'Mahony (114), Paul O'Connell (108), John Hayes (105), and Keith Earls (101). Including Lions caps, O'Driscoll has 141 caps (sixth highest in rugby), Murray (133), O'Gara (130), Sexton (124), O'Connell and O'Mahony (115), and Hayes (107) caps.

Sexton holds the Irish record for the most test points scored with 1,108, placing him fourth all-time in international rugby. He also holds the record for the highest points scored in Six Nations history (566), in front of his teammate Ronan O'Gara (557). Brian O'Driscoll holds the record for the most test tries scored for Ireland with 46 tries.

=== World Rugby Awards ===
The following Ireland players have been recognised at the World Rugby Awards since 2001:

World Rugby Player of the Year
Year	Nominees	Winners
2001	Brian O'Driscoll	Keith Wood
2001	Keith Wood	Keith Wood
2002	Brian O'Driscoll (2)	—
2004	Gordon D'Arcy	—
2006	Paul O'Connell	—
2009	Jamie Heaslip	—
2009	Brian O'Driscoll (3)	—
2014	Johnny Sexton	—
2016	Jamie Heaslip (2)	—
2018	Johnny Sexton (2)	Johnny Sexton
2022	Johnny Sexton (3)	Josh van der Flier
2022	Josh van der Flier	Josh van der Flier
2023	Bundee Aki	—
2024	Caelan Doris	—

World Rugby Breakthrough Player of the Year
Year	Nominees	Winners
2018	Jordan Larmour	—
2022	Mack Hansen	—
2022	Dan Sheehan	—
2024	Jamie Osborne	—

World Rugby Dream Team of the Year
Year	No.	Players
2021	3.	Tadhg Furlong
2022	3.	Tadhg Furlong (2)
2022	4.	Tadhg Beirne
2022	7.	Josh van der Flier
2022	10.	Johnny Sexton
2023	2.	Dan Sheehan
2023	3.	Tadhg Furlong (3)
2023	6.	Caelan Doris
2023	12.	Bundee Aki
2023	13.	Garry Ringrose
2024	5.	Tadhg Beirne (2)
2024	8.	Caelan Doris (2)
2024	9.	Jamison Gibson-Park
2024	11.	James Lowe
2025	5.	Tadhg Beirne (3)

World Rugby Try of the Year
Year	Date	Scorer	Match	Tournament
2008	14 June	Brian O'Driscoll	vs. Australia	Summer Internationals
2016	12 March	Jamie Heaslip	vs. Italy	Six Nations

=== Six Nations Player of the Championship ===
The following Ireland players have been shortlisted for the Six Nations Player of the Championship since 2004:

Six Nations Player of the Year (2004–10)
Year	Nominees	Winners
2004	Shane Byrne	Gordon D'Arcy
2004	Gordon D'Arcy	Gordon D'Arcy
2004	Simon Easterby	Gordon D'Arcy
2004	Paul O'Connell	Gordon D'Arcy
2005	Paul O'Connell (2)	—
2005	Brian O'Driscoll	—
2005	Ronan O'Gara	—
2005	Malcolm O'Kelly	—
2006	Simon Easterby (2)	Brian O'Driscoll
2006	Jerry Flannery	Brian O'Driscoll
2006	Shane Horgan	Brian O'Driscoll
2006	Denis Leamy	Brian O'Driscoll
2006	Brian O'Driscoll (2)	Brian O'Driscoll
2006	Ronan O'Gara (2)	Brian O'Driscoll
2006	David Wallace	Brian O'Driscoll
2007	Paul O'Connell (3)	Brian O'Driscoll (2)
2007	Brian O'Driscoll (3)	Brian O'Driscoll (2)
2007	Ronan O'Gara (3)	Brian O'Driscoll (2)
2007	David Wallace (2)	Brian O'Driscoll (2)
2009	Paul O'Connell (4)	Brian O'Driscoll (3)
2009	Brian O'Driscoll (4)	Brian O'Driscoll (3)
2009	Jamie Heaslip	Brian O'Driscoll (3)
2010	Tommy Bowe	Tommy Bowe

Six Nations Player of the Year (2011–19)
Year	Nominees	Winners
2011	Seán O'Brien	—
2011	Ronan O'Gara (4)	—
2012	Donnacha Ryan	—
2012	Johnny Sexton	—
2013	Conor Murray	—
2013	Brian O'Driscoll (5)	—
2014	Cian Healy	—
2014	Jamie Heaslip (2)	—
2014	Rob Kearney	—
2014	Brian O'Driscoll (6)	—
2014	Johnny Sexton (2)	—
2014	Andrew Trimble	—
2015	Robbie Henshaw	Paul O'Connell
2015	Paul O'Connell (5)	Paul O'Connell
2015	Conor Murray (2)	Paul O'Connell
2016	Conor Murray (3)	—
2016	Johnny Sexton (3)	—
2017	Conor Murray (4)	—
2017	CJ Stander	—
2018	Keith Earls	Jacob Stockdale
2018	Conor Murray (5)	Jacob Stockdale
2018	Johnny Sexton (4)	Jacob Stockdale
2018	Jacob Stockdale	Jacob Stockdale

Six Nations Player of the Year (2020–)
Year	Nominees	Winners
2020	CJ Stander (2)	—
2021	Tadhg Beirne	—
2021	Robbie Henshaw (2)	—
2022	Josh van der Flier	—
2023	Caelan Doris	—
2023	Mack Hansen	—
2023	Hugo Keenan	—
2024	Bundee Aki	—
2026	Stuart McCloskey	—

Six Nations Team of the Championship
Year	1st XV				2nd XV			
Year	Forwards		Backs		Forwards		Backs	
Year	No.	Players	No.	Players	No.	Players	No.	Players
2021	3.	Tadhg Furlong	10.	Johnny Sexton	Not awarded			
2021	4.	Tadhg Beirne	10.	Johnny Sexton	Not awarded			
2021	6.	CJ Stander	12.	Robbie Henshaw	Not awarded			
2022	3.	Tadhg Furlong (2)	15.	Hugo Keenan	Not awarded			
2022	7.	Josh van der Flier	15.	Hugo Keenan	Not awarded			
2023	1.	Andrew Porter	10.	Johnny Sexton (2)	3.	Tadhg Furlong	9.	Conor Murray
2023	2.	Dan Sheehan	10.	Johnny Sexton (2)	3.	Tadhg Furlong	12.	Bundee Aki
2023	3.	Finlay Bealham	10.	Johnny Sexton (2)	3.	Tadhg Furlong	12.	Bundee Aki
2023	5.	James Ryan	11.	James Lowe	3.	Tadhg Furlong	13.	Garry Ringrose
2023	6.	Peter O'Mahony	11.	James Lowe	4.	Tadhg Beirne	13.	Garry Ringrose
2023	7.	Josh van der Flier (2)	15.	Hugo Keenan (2)	4.	Tadhg Beirne	14.	Mack Hansen
2023	8.	Caelan Doris	15.	Hugo Keenan (2)	4.	Tadhg Beirne	14.	Mack Hansen
2024	1.	Andrew Porter (2)	9.	Jamison Gibson-Park	Not awarded			
2024	2.	Dan Sheehan (2)	9.	Jamison Gibson-Park	Not awarded			
2024	4.	Tadhg Beirne (2)	11.	James Lowe (2)	Not awarded			
2024	5.	Joe McCarthy	11.	James Lowe (2)	Not awarded			
2024	6.	Caelan Doris (2)	13.	Bundee Aki	Not awarded			
2025	1.	Andrew Porter (3)	—		Not awarded			
2025	2.	Dan Sheehan (3)	—		Not awarded			
2026	4.	Tadhg Beirne (3)	12.	Stuart McCloskey	Not awarded			
2026	6.	Jack Conan	12.	Stuart McCloskey	Not awarded			

Six Nations Try of the Championship
Year	Nominee	Match	Winner	Ref
2023	Hugo Keenan	vs. France	—	
2024	Calvin Nash	vs. Italy	—	

== Coaching and management ==
=== Current coaches ===
Updated as of 9 February 2025

Position	Name	Nationality
Head coach	Andy Farrell	England
Defence coach	Simon Easterby	Ireland
Backs coach	Andrew Goodman	New Zealand
Kicking & Attack coach	Johnny Sexton	Ireland
Forwards coach	Paul O'Connell	Ireland
Scrum coach	John Fogarty	Ireland
Head of athletic performance	Aled Walters	Wales
Strength & conditioning coach	Ciaran Ruddock	Ireland
High performance analyst	Vinny Hammond	Ireland
Team doctor	Jim McShane	Ireland
Head of communication	Peter Breen	Ireland
Team manager	Gerard Carmody	Ireland

World Rugby Coach of the Year
Year	Nominees	Winners	Nationality
2001	Eddie O'Sullivan	—	Ireland
2008	Declan Kidney	Declan Kidney	Ireland
2018	Joe Schmidt	Joe Schmidt	New Zealand
2022	Andy Farrell	—	England
2023	Andy Farrell	Andy Farrell	England

=== Past coaches ===
The IRFU first appointed a coach in 1968. The current head coach is Andy Farrell, who has been in the position since 2019.

- (Ireland) Ronnie Dawson: 1969–1972
- (Ireland) Syd Millar: 1973–1975
- (Ireland) Roly Meates: 1975–1977
- (Ireland) Noel Murphy: 1977–1980
- (Ireland) Tom Kiernan: 1980–1983
- (Ireland) Willie John McBride: 1983–1984
- (Ireland) Mick Doyle: 1984–1987
- (Ireland) Jim Davidson: 1987–1990
- (Ireland) Ciaran Fitzgerald: 1990–1992
- (Ireland) Gerry Murphy: 1993–1995
- (New Zealand) Murray Kidd: 1995–1997
- (England) Brian Ashton: 1997–1998
- (New Zealand) Warren Gatland: 1998–2001
- (Ireland) Eddie O'Sullivan: 2001–2008
- (Ireland) Michael Bradley: 2008 (interim coach)
- (Ireland) Declan Kidney: 2008–2013
- (Australia) Les Kiss: 2013 (interim coach)
- (New Zealand) Joe Schmidt: 2013–2019
- (England) Andy Farrell: 2019–
- (Ireland) Simon Easterby: 2025 (interim coach)
- (Ireland) Paul O'Connell: 2025 (interim coach)

=== Head coaches and statistics (professional era) ===
Correct as of 21 November 2026

Coach	Season(s)	GP	W	D	L	Win %	Loss %	Championships / notes
(New Zealand) Murray Kidd	1995–1997	9	3	0	6	33.3%	66.7%	—
(England) Brian Ashton	1997–1998	8	2	0	6	25%	75%	—
(New Zealand) Warren Gatland	1998–2001	38	18	1	19	47.37%	50%	—
(Ireland) Eddie O'Sullivan	2001–2008	78	50	0	28	64.1%	35.9%	Triple Crown (2004, 2006, 2007)
(Ireland) Michael Bradley	2008	2	0	0	2	0%	100%	Interim coach
(Ireland) Declan Kidney	2008–2013	53	28	3	22	52.83%	41.51%	2009 Six Nations Championship (& Grand Slam 2009); Triple Crown (2009); World Rugby Coach of the Year (2009)
(Australia) Les Kiss	2013	2	2	0	0	100%	0%	Interim coach
(New Zealand) Joe Schmidt	2013–2019	76	55	1	20	72.37%	26.32%	Six Nations Championship (2014, 2015, 2018) (& Grand Slam 2018); Triple Crown (2018); World Rugby Team of the Year (2018); World Rugby Coach of the Year (2018); RTÉ Coach of the Year (2014); 1st in world rankings (September 2019)
(England) Andy Farrell	2019–	70	54	0	16	77.14%	22.86%	Six Nations Championship (2023, 2024) (& Grand Slam 2023); Triple Crown (2022, 2023, 2026); 1st in world rankings (July 2022–October 2023, September–November 2024); World Rugby Coach of the Year (2023) RTÉ Coach of the Year (2023)
(Ireland) Simon Easterby	2025	5	4	0	1	80%	20%	Interim coach; Triple Crown (2025)
(Ireland) Paul O'Connell	2025	2	2	0	0	100%	0%	Interim coach
Total	1995–present	343	218	5	120	63.56%	34.99%	—N/a

== Media coverage ==
Ireland's end-of-year tests were broadcast by the BBC until 2013 when Sky Sports secured the rights. From November 2018, the TV rights to the end-of-year matches were held by Channel 4 in the UK and RTÉ in Ireland, while Virgin Media Television/RTÉ and BBC/ITV retained the Six Nations rights, and ITV and Virgin Media Television with Eir Sports have the rights to the Rugby World Cup. From 2022, Prime Video holds the rights for Ireland's end-of-year internationals. As of 2024, TNT Sports hold the rights to Ireland's end-of-year internationals.

== See also ==
- Ireland Wolfhounds
- Emerging Ireland
- Ireland national under-20 rugby union team
- Ireland national under-18 rugby union team
- Ireland national rugby sevens team
- Millennium Trophy
