= 1999–2000 Connacht Rugby season =

- Ground(s): The Sportsground, Galway
- Coach: Glen Ross
- Top scorer: Eric Elwood (106)
- Most tries: Martyn Steffert (4)
- League(s): Challenge Cup (3rd in pool); IRFU Interprovincial Championship (4th)

The 1999–2000 season was Connacht's fifth season under professionalism, and their second under head coach Clive Ross. They competed in the IRFU Interprovincial Championship, finishing fourth with no wins, and the European Challenge Cup, finishing third in their pool. Ross resigned at the end of the season.

== Player transfers ==
=== Players in ===
- (Ireland) Mel Deane from (England) Richmond
- (Ireland) Conor Kilroy from (Ireland) Munster
- (New Zealand) Mark McConnell
- (New Zealand) Shane McDonald
- (Ireland) Stephen McIvor from (Ireland) Munster
- (Ireland) Matt Mostyn from (France) Bègles-Bordeaux
- (England) Gavin Webster from (England) Rotherham

=== Players out ===
- (Ireland) Owen Cobbe
- (Ireland) Mick Finlay
- (Ireland) Graham Heaslip
- (Ireland) Willie Ruane
- (Ireland) Russell Southam

== Squad ==
Connacht Rugby squad
**Props**: (Ireland) Martin Cahill; (Ireland) John Maher; (Ireland) Jimmy Screene; **Hookers**: (Ireland) Bernard Jackman; (New Zealand) Shane McDonald; (Ireland) Joe McVeigh; **Locks**: (New Zealand) Mark McConnell; (Ireland) Colm Rigney; (England) Gavin Webster	**Back row**: (Ireland) Eoin Brennan; (Ireland) John Casserly; (New Zealand) Junior Charlie; (Ireland) Ian Dillon; (Ireland) Barry Gavin; (Ireland) Shane McEntee; (Ireland) Ultan O'Callaghan; (New Zealand) Martyn Steffert; **Scrum-halves**: (Ireland) James Ferris; (Ireland) **Conor McGuinness**; (Ireland) **Stephen McIvor**; (Ireland) David Mescal; **Fly-halves**: (Ireland) **Eric Elwood**	**Centres**: (Ireland) Mel Deane; (Ireland) Matt Mostyn; (Ireland) Mervyn Murphy; **Wings**: (Ireland) Nigel Carolan; (Ireland) **Pat Duignan**; **Fullbacks**: (New Zealand) Simon Allnutt; (Ireland) Conor Kilroy
(c) denotes the team captain, **Bold** denotes internationally capped players.^{*} denotes players qualified to play for Ireland on residency or dual nationality.

== IRFU Interprovincial Championship ==
Team	P	W	D	L	F	A	BP	Pts	Status
Munster	6	6	0	0	242	103	5	29	Champions; qualified for 2000–01 Heineken Cup
Ulster	6	3	0	3	186	129	3	15	Qualified for next season's Heineken Cup
Leinster	6	2	0	4	145	137	2	10	Qualified for 2000–01 Heineken Cup
Connacht	6	0	0	6	85	289	1	1	Qualified 2000–01 European Challenge Cup

7 August 1999	**Connacht**	**9-50**	**Ulster**	Galway Sportsgrounds
	Pen: Elwood (3)	Report	Try: J. Topping; McWhirter; Cunningham; O'Cuinneagain; Howe; Clarke; Con: Mason (3); Pen: Mason (3)	Referee: M. White
Connacht lineup: 1. John Maher, 2. Joe McVeigh, 3. Jimmy Screene, 4. Gavin Webster, 5. Mark McConnell, 6. Martyn Steffert, 7. Barry Gavin, 8. Bernard Jackman, 9. Conor McGuinness, 10. Eric Elwood, 11. Pat Duignan, 12. Mervyn Murphy, 13. Mel Deane, 14. Matt Mostyn, 15. Simon Allnutt.; Replacements: Martin Cahill (for Screene 42'), Colm Rigney (for Webster 27-32, for Steffert 56'), Nigel Carolan (for Duignan 57'), Eoin Brennan (for McVeigh 67').				Referee: M. White

14 August 1999	**Connacht**	**17–67**	**Munster**	Galway Sportsgrounds
	Try: Duignan; Murphy; Con: Elwood (2); Pen: Elwood	Report	Try: O'Gara; Crotty (3); Kelly (2); Lynch; Wallace; Corkery; Sheehan; Con: O'Gara (7); Pen: O'Gara
Connacht lineup: 1. Jimmy Screene, 2. Shane McDonald, 3. Martin Cahill, 4. Colm Rigney, 5. Mark McConnell, 6. John Casserly, 7. Barry Gavin, 8. Bernard Jackman, 9. Conor McGuinness, 10. Eric Elwood, 11. Pat Duignan, 12. Mervyn Murphy, 13. Mel Deane, 14. Matt Mostyn, 15. Simon Allnutt.; Replacements: Conor Kilroy (for Allnutt 29'), Nigel Carolan (for Kilroy 63'), John Maher (for Cahill 67'), Eoin Brennan (for Jackman 75').

3 September 1999	**Leinster**	**22-19**	**Connacht**	Donnybrook Stadium
	Try: S. Byrne; O'Driscoll; Pen: Dempsey; Everitt (3)	Report	Try: Deane; Con: Elwood; Pen: Elwood (4)
Connacht lineup: 1. John Maher, 2. Shane McDonald, 3. Martin Cahill, 5. Gavin Webster, 6. Mark McConnell, 6. Martyn Steffert, 7. Barry Gavin, 8. Eoin Brennan, 9. Conor McGuinness, 10. Eric Elwood, 11. Pat Duignan. 12. Mel Deane, 13. Marvyn Murphy, 14. Matt Mostyn, 15. Simon Allnutt.; Replacements: Stephen McIvor (for McGuinness 42'), Joe McVeigh (for McDonald 66'), Shane McEntee (for Brennan 80')

30 October 1999	**Connacht**	**8-53**	**Leinster**	Musgrave Park
	Try: Deane; Pen: Elwood	Report	Try: Costello (2); McWeeney (2); D'Arcy (2); Hickie; Horgan; Farrell; Con: Everitt (2); Farrell
Connacht lineup: 1. John Maher, 2. Shane McDonald, 3. Martin Cahill, 5. Gavin Webster, 6. Mark McConnell, 6. Colm Rigney, 7. Eoin Brennan, 8. Martyn Steffert, 9. Stephen McIvor, 10. Eric Elwood, 11. Pat Duignan. 12. Mel Deane, 13. Marvyn Murphy, 14. Matt Mostyn, 15. Simon Allnutt.; Replacements: Barry Gavin (for Brennan 15'), Bernard Jackman (for Steffert 51'), Jimmy Screene (for Cahill 51'), Nigel Carolan (for Mostyn 55').

5 November 1999	**Ulster**	**44-22**	**Connacht**	Ravenhill
	Try: Bromley (2); Blair; McWhirter; Cunningham; Ward; Con: Mason (4); Pen: Mason (2)	Report	Try: Steffert; Mostyn; Penalty try Con: Elwood (2); Pen: Elwood
Connacht lineup: 1. John Maher, 2. Shane McDonald, 3. Martin Cahill, 5. Gavin Webster, 6. Mark McConnell, 6. Colm Rigney, 7. Eoin Brennan, 8. Martyn Steffert, 9. Stephen McIvor, 10. Eric Elwood, 11. Nigel Carolan, 12. Mel Deane, 13. Matt Mostyn, 14. Pat Duignan, 15. Simon Allnutt.; Replacements: Barry Gavin (for Rigney 54'), David Mescal (for McIvor 79').

12 November 1999	**Munster**	**53–10**	**Connacht**	Thomond Park
	Try: Mullins; Horan; Horgan; Foley; Staunton (2); Kelly; Con: Keane (6); Pen: Keane (2)	Report	Try: Allnutt; Con: Elwood; Pen: Elwood
Connacht lineup: 1. John Maher, 2. Shane McDonald, 3. Martin Cahill, 5. Gavin Webster, 6. Mark McConnell, 6. Barry Gavin, 7. Eoin Brennan, 8. Martyn Steffert, 9. David Mescal, 10. Eric Elwood, 11. Nigel Carolan, 12. Mel Deane, 13. Matt Mostyn, 14. Pat Duignan, 15. Simon Allnutt.; Replacements: Bernard Jackman (for Brennan 53'), Conor Kilroy (for Deane 68').

== European Challenge Cup ==
=== Pool 4 ===
Team	P	W	D	L	Tries for	Tries against	Try diff	Points for	Points against	Points diff	Pts
(Wales) **Ebbw Vale**	6	6	0	0	31	13	18	252	127	125	**12**
(France) Toulon	6	3	0	3	17	8	9	178	148	30	**6**
(Ireland) Connacht	6	2	0	4	15	18	−3	131	165	−34	**4**
(Romania) Steaua București	6	1	0	5	13	37	−24	120	241	−121	**2**

19 November 1999	**Ebbw Vale (Wales)**	**32 – 9**	**(Ireland) Connacht**	Eugene Cross Park
19:30	Try: Easterby; Williams; Con: Connor (2); Pen: Connor (6)	Report	Pen: Elwood (3)	Attendance: 2,500
Connacht lineup: 1. John Maher, 2. Shane McDonald, 3. Martin Cahill, 4. Gavin Webster, 5. Mark McConnell, 6. Junior Charlie, 7. Barry Gavin, 8. Ian Dillon, 9. David Mescal, 10. Eric Elwood, 11. Nigel Carolan, 12. Mel Deane, 13. Matt Mostyn, 14. Pat Duignan, 15. Simon Allnutt.; Replacements: Mervyn Murphy, James Ferris, Bernard Jackman, Ultan O'Callaghan.				Attendance: 2,500

27 November 1999	**Steaua Bucharest (Romania)**	**30 – 20**	**(Ireland) Connacht**	Club of Army
14:30	Try: Mocanu; Boldor; Balmos; Con: Popisteanu (3); Pen: Popisteanu; Drop: Popisteanu (2)	Report	Try: Jackman; O'Callaghan; Elwood; Con: Elwood; Pen: Elwood	Attendance: 1,500
Connacht lineup: 1. John Maher, 2. Bernard Jackman, 3. Martin Cahill, 4. Mark McConnell, 5. Gavin Webster, 6. Barry Gavin, 7. Ian Dillon, 8. Ultan O'Callaghan, 9. James Ferris, 10. Eric Elwood, 11. Nigel Carolan, 12. Mel Deane, 13. Matt Mostyn, 14. Pat Duignan, 15. Simon Allnutt.; Replacements: Conor Kilroy, Eoin Brennan.				Attendance: 1,500

11 December 1999	**Connacht (Ireland)**	**27 – 13**	**(France) Toulon**	Sportsground
14:30	Try: O'Callaghan; Screene; Con: Elwood; Pen: Elwood (5)	Report	Try: Mignoni; Con: Burton; Pen: Burton (2)	Attendance: 1,000
Connacht lineup: 1. Jimmy Screene, 2. Bernard Jackman, 3. Martin Cahill, 4. Gavin Webster, 5. Mark McConnell, 6. Junior Charlie, 7. Ian Dillon, 8. Ultan O'Callaghan, 9. Stephen McIvor, 10. Eric Elwood, 11. Pat Duignan, 12. Mervyn Murphy, 13. Mel Deane, 14. Matt Mostyn, 15. Simon Allnutt.; Replacements: John Maher, Colm Rigney.				Attendance: 1,000

18 December 1999	**Toulon (France)**	**41 – 15**	**(Ireland) Connacht**	Stade Félix Mayol
20:00	Try: Mignoni; Delmotte; Salacroux; Macurdy; Con: Burton (3); Pen: Burton (5)	Report	Pen: Elwood (5)	Attendance: 1,500
Connacht lineup: 1. Jimmy Screene, 2. Bernard Jackman, 3. Martin Cahill, 4. Gavin Webster, 5. Mark McConnell, 6. Ultan O'Callaghan, 7. Ian Dillon, 8. Martyn Steffert, 9. Stephen McIvor, 10. Eric Elwood, 11. Pat Duignan, 12. Mervyn Murphy, 13. Mel Deane, 14. Matt Mostyn, 15. Simon Allnutt.; Replacements: Conor Kilroy, John Maher, Colm Rigney, Eoin Brennan.				Attendance: 1,500

8 January 2000	**Connacht (Ireland)**	**41 – 7**	**(Romania) Steaua Bucharest**	Sportsground
14:30	Try: McConnell; Duignan; Allnutt; Steffert (3); Mostyn; Screene; Con: Elwood (3)	Report	Try: Boldor; Con: Popisteanu	Attendance: 1,000
Connacht lineup: 1. Jimmy Screene, 2. Bernard Jackman, 3. Martin Cahill, 4. Gavin Webster, 5. Mark McConnell, 6. Barry Gavin, 7. Ian Dillon, 8. Martyn Steffert, 9. Stephen McIvor, 10. Eric Elwood, 11. Pat Duignan, 12. Mervyn Murphy, 13. Mel Deane, 14. Matt Mostyn, 15. Simon Allnutt.; Replacements: John Maher.				Attendance: 1,000

15 January 2000	**Connacht (Ireland)**	**19 – 42**	**(Wales) Ebbw Vale**	Sportsground
14:30	Try: Mostyn; Deane; Kilroy; Con: Elwood (2)	Report	Try: Wagstaff; Easterby; Shorney; Green; Banks; Con: Connor (4); Pen: Connor (3)	Attendance: 1,500
Connacht lineup: 1. Jimmy Screene, 2. Bernard Jackman, 3. Martin Cahill, 4. Colm Rigney, 5. Mark McConnell, 6. Barry Gavin, 7. Ian Dillon, 8. Martyn Steffert, 9. Stephen McIvor, 10. Eric Elwood, 11. Pat Duignan, 12. Mervyn Murphy, 13. Mel Deane, 14. Matt Mostyn, 15. Simon Allnutt.; Replacements: Conor Kilroy.				Attendance: 1,500

== Representative ==
21 August 1999	**Connacht (Ireland)**	**26-43**	**Ireland Select XV**	Sportsground
	Try: Quinlan (2); Deane; Con: Elwood; Pen: Elwood (3)	Report	Try: Maggs; Miller; Topping; O'Meara; Mullins; Con: Humphreys (4); Pen: Humphreys
Connacht lineup: 1.John Maher, 2. Shane McDonald, 3. Martin Cahill, 4. Colm Rogney, 5. Mark McConnell, 6. Alan Quinlan, 7. Barry Gavin, 8. David Wallace, 9. Conor McGuinness, 10. Eric Elwood, 11. Nigel Carolan, 12. Mel Deane, 13. Mervyn Murphy, 14. Pat Duignan, 15. Simon Allnut.; Replacements: A. Kearney (for Rigney 58'), Stephen McIvor (for McGuinness 62'), Eoin Brennan (for Wallace 63'), D. Brady (for Deane 75').
Ireland Select XV lineup: 1. Justin Fitzpatrick, 2. R. Nesdale, 3. Angus McKeen, 4. Jeremy Davidson, 5. Malcolm O'Kelly, 6. Trevor Brennan, 7. Dion O'Cuinneagain, 8. Andy Ward, 9. Brian O'Meara, 10. David Humphreys, 11. Matt Mostyn, 12. Kevin Maggs, 13. Brian O'Driscoll, 14. James Topping, 15 Conor O'Shea. Replacements: Paddy Johns (for O'Kelly 51'), Paul Wallace (for McKeen 51'), Eric Miller (for Brennan 51'), Ronan O'Gara (for Humphreys 73'), Mike Mullins (for Maggs 73').
