= 1999–2000 Leinster Rugby season =

- Ground(s): Donnybrook, Dublin
- Coach(es): Mike Ruddock
- Top scorer: Emmett Farrell (62)
- Most tries: Denis Hickie (5); John McWeeney (5)
- League(s): Heineken Cup (2nd in pool); IRFU Interprovincial Championship (3rd)

The 1999-2000 season was Leinster's fifth season under professionalism, and their third under head coach Mike Ruddock. They competed in the Heineken Cup, finishing second in their pool, and the IRFU Interprovincial Championship, finishing third. They hosted Argentina, losing 22-51, featuring guest players Rob Henderson and Kieron Dawson.

== Player transfers ==
=== Players in ===
- (Ireland) Bob Casey
- (Ireland) Leo Cullen
- (Ireland) Brian Cusack
- (Ireland) Barry Everitt from (Ireland) Munster
- (New Zealand) Stu Forster
- (Ireland) Gary Halpin from (England) Harlequins
- (Ireland) Brian O'Driscoll
- (Ireland) Malcolm O'Kelly from (England) London Irish
- (Ireland) Liam Toland from (Ireland) Munster

=== Players out ===
- (Ireland) Fergal Campion
- (Ireland) Brian Carey
- (Ireland) Ciaran Clarke (retired)
- (Ireland) Pat Holden
- (Ireland) Tim Mannix
- (Ireland) Alan McGowan
- (Ireland) Kevin Nowlan
- (Ireland) Rory Sherriff
- (Ireland) Pat Ward

== Squad ==
Leinster Rugby squad
**Props**: (Ireland) Emmet Byrne; (Ireland) **Reggie Corrigan**; (Ireland) Peter Coyle; (Ireland) **Gary Halpin**; (Ireland) **Angus McKeen**; **Hookers**: (Ireland) James Blaney; (Ireland) Shane Byrne; (Ireland) Peter Smyth; **Locks**: (Ireland) Bob Casey; (Ireland) Leo Cullen; (Ireland) Brian Cusack; (Ireland) **Gabriel Fulcher**; (Ireland) **Malcolm O'Kelly**	**Back row**: (Ireland) **Trevor Brennan**; (Ireland) **Victor Costello**; (Ireland) Colin McEntee; (Ireland) Declan O'Brien; (Ireland) Liam Toland; **Scrum-halves**: (New Zealand) Stu Forster; (Ireland) Derek Hegarty; (Ireland) **Ciaran Scally**; **Fly-halves**: (Ireland) Barry Everitt; (Ireland) Emmett Farrell; (Ireland) Mark McHugh	**Centres**: (Ireland) Gareth Gannon; (Ireland) Shane Horgan; (Ireland) **Brian O'Driscoll**; (South Africa) Daniel Whiston; **Wings**: (Ireland) Gordon D'Arcy; (Ireland) **Denis Hickie** (c); (Ireland) Peter McKenna; (Ireland) **John McWeeney**; **Fullbacks**: (Ireland) **Girvan Dempsey**; (Ireland) G. Dunphy
(c) denotes the team captain, **Bold** denotes internationally capped players.^{*} denotes players qualified to play for Ireland on residency or dual nationality.

== IRFU Interprovincial Championship ==
Team	P	W	D	L	F	A	BP	Pts	Status
Munster	6	6	0	0	242	103	5	29	Champions; qualified for 2000–01 Heineken Cup
Ulster	6	3	0	3	186	129	3	15	Qualified for next season's Heineken Cup
Leinster	6	2	0	4	145	137	2	10	Qualified for 2000–01 Heineken Cup
Connacht	6	0	0	6	85	289	1	1	Qualified 2000–01 European Challenge Cup

7 August 1999	**Munster**	**31–20**	**Leinster**	Temple Hill
	Try: Langford; Foley; Kelly; O'Neill; Con: O'Gara (4); Pen: O'Gara	Report	Try: Hickie (2); Con: Everitt; Pen: Everitt (2)
Leinster lineup: 1. Reggie Corigan, 2. Shane Byrne, 3. Angus McKeen, 4. Bob Casey, 5. Malcolm O'Kelly, 6. Trevor Brennan, 7. Victor Costello, 8. Liam Toland, 9. Ciaran Scally, 10. Barry Everitt, 11. Denis Hickie (c), 12. Gareth Gannon, 13. Brian O'Driscoll, 14. John McWeeney, 15. Girvan Dempsey.; Replacements: Peter Smyth (for Byrne 60'), Declan O'Brien (for Brennan 60'), Gary Halpin (for McKeen 74'), Derek Hegarty (for Scally 77'), Peter McKenna (for Hickie 74-76').

13 August 1999	**Leinster**	**15-26**	**Ulster**	Donnybrook
	Pen: Everitt (5)	Report	Try: Howe; Mason; Con: Mason (2); Pen: Mason (3); Drop: Humphreys
Leinster lineup: 1. Reggie Corrigan, 2. Shane Byrne, 3. Angus McKeen, 4. Bob Casey, 5. Malcolm O'Kelly, 6. Trevor Brennan, 7. Liam Toland, 8. Victor Costello, 9. Ciaran Scally, 10. Barry Everitt, 11. Denis Hickie (c), 12. Brian O'Driscoll, 13. Gareth Gannon, 14. John McWeeney, 15. Girvan Dempsey.; Replacements: Gary Halpin (for McKeen 79')

3 September 1999	**Leinster**	**22-19**	**Connacht**	Donnybrook Stadium
	Try: S. Byrne; O'Driscoll; Pen: Dempsey; Everitt (3)	Report	Try: Deane; Con: Elwood; Pen: Elwood (4)
Leinster lineup: 1. Reggie Corrigan, 2. Shane Byrne (c), 3. Angus McKeen, 4. Bob Casey, 5. Malcolm O'Kelly, 6. Trevor Brennan, 7. Victor Costello, 8. Liam Toland, 9. Derek Hegarty, 10. Barry Everitt, 11. John McWeeney, 12. Brian O'Driscoll, 13. Peter McKenna, 14. Gordon D'Arcy, 15. Girvan Dempsey.; Replacements: Gareth Gannon (for Dempsey 8'), Declan O'Brien (for Brennan 46'), Mark McHugh (for Gannon 79').

30 October 1999	**Connacht**	**8-53**	**Leinster**	Musgrave Park
	Try: Deane; Pen: Elwood	Report	Try: Costello (2); McWeeney (2); D'Arcy (2); Hickie; Horgan; Farrell; Con: Everitt (2); Farrell
Leinster lineup: 1. Reggie Corrigan, 2. Shane Byrne, 3. Angus McKeen, 4. Bob Casey, 5. Malcolm O'Kelly, 6. Declan O'Brien, 7. Victor Costello, 8. Liam Toland (c); 9. Derek Hegarty, 10. Barry Everitt, 11. John McWeeney, 12. Shane Horgan, 13, Peter McKenna, 14. Denis Hickie, 15. Gordon D'Arcy, Replacements: Peter Coyle (for McKeen 65'), Emmett Farrell (for Everitt 69'), Stuart Forster (for Hegarty 69'), Peter Smyth (for Byrne 69'), Colin McEntee (for Costello 69').

5 November 1999	**Leinster**	**13–30**	**Munster**	Donnybrook
	Try: Horgan; Con: Everitt; Pen: Everitt; Drop: Everitt	Report	Try: O'Neill (2); Wood; Foley; Con: O'Gara (2); Pen: O'Gara (2)
Leinster lineup: 1. Reggie Corrigan, 2. Shane Byrne, 3. Angus McKeen, 4. Bob Casey, 5. Malcolm O'Kelly, 6. Declan O'Brien, 7. Victor Costello, 8. Liam Toland (c); 9. Derek Hegarty, 10. Barry Everitt, 11. John McWeeney, 12. Shane Horgan, 13, Peter McKenna, 14. Denis Hickie, 15. Gordon D'Arcy, Replacements: Mark McHugh (for D'Arcy 54'), Emmett Farrell (for Everitt 74'), Peter Smyth (for Byrne 74')

12 November 1999	**Ulster**	**22-23**	**Leinster**	Ravenhill
	Try: Bromley; Con: Mason; Pen: Mason (5)	Report	Try: Hickie; Pen: McHugh (6)
Leinster lineup: 1. Emmet Byrne, 2. J. Blaney, 3. Gary Halpin, 4. Bob Casey, 5. Malcolm O'Kelly, 6. Declan O'Brien, 7. Liam Toland, 8. Victor Costello; 9. Stuart Forster, 10. Mark McHugh, 11. Denis Hickie, 12. Daniel Whiston, 13, Peter McKenna, 14. Gordon D'Arcy, 15. G. Dunphy, Replacements: Leo Cullen (for Costello 46'), Reggie Corrigan (E. Byrne 64'), Shane Byrne (for Blaney 60', Angus McKeen (for Halpin 60').

== Heineken Cup ==
=== Pool 1 ===
Team	P	W	D	L	Tries for	Tries against	Try diff	Points for	Points against	Points diff	Pts
(France) **Stade Français**	6	4	0	2	22	9	13	192	109	83	**8**
(Ireland) Leinster	6	4	0	2	12	17	−5	150	138	12	**8**
(Scotland) Glasgow Rugby	6	2	0	4	14	23	−9	130	179	−49	**4**
(England) Leicester Tigers	6	2	0	4	12	11	1	127	173	−46	**4**

19 November 1999	**Leinster (Ireland)**	**27–20**	**(England) Leicester Tigers**	Donnybrook
19:30	Pen: McHugh (7); Drop: McHugh (2)	Report	Try: Howard; Pen: Stimpson (5)	Attendance: 6,500
Leinster lineup: 1. Emmet Byrne, 2. Shane Byrne, 3. Angus McKeen, 4. Malcolm O'Kelly, 5. Bob Casey, 6. Liam Toland, 7. Declan O'Brien, 8. Victor Costello, 9. Derek Hegarty, 10 Mark McHugh, 11. Peter McKenna, 12. Brian O'Driscoll, 13. Shane Horgan, 14. Denis Hickie, 15. Girvan Dempsey.; Replacements: Reggie Corrigan, Leo Cullen.				Attendance: 6,500

26 November 1999	**Glasgow (Scotland)**	**29–17**	**(Ireland) Leinster**	Hughenden, Glasgow
19:30	Try: Longstaff (2); Bulloch; Hayes; Con: Hayes (3); Pen: Hayes	Report	Try: S. Byrne; Penalty try Con: McHugh (2); Pen: McHugh	Attendance: 1,800
Leinster lineup: 1. Emmet Byrne, 2. Shane Byrne, 3. Gary Halpin, 4. Bob Casey, 5. Leo Cullen, 6. Declan O'Brien, 7. Liam Toland, 8. Victor Costello, 9. Derek Hegarty, 10 Mark McHugh, 11. Peter McKenna, 12. Shane Horgan, 13. Brian O'Driscoll, 14. Denis Hickie, 15. Girvan Dempsey.; Replacements: Gordon D'Arcy, Reggie Corrigan, Peter Smyth, Gabriel Fulcher.				Attendance: 1,800

12 December 1999	**Stade Français (France)**	**39–6**	**(Ireland) Leinster**	Stade Jean-Bouin
15:00	Try: Moni; Dominici (2); Stolz; Lombard (2); Con: Domínguez (3); Pen: Domínguez	Report	Pen: McHugh (2)	Attendance: 3,424
Leinster lineup: 1. Reggie Corrigan, 2. Shane Byrne, 3. Gary Halpin, 4. Bob Casey, 5. Malcolm O'Kelly, 6. Declan O'Brien, 7. Liam Toland, 8. Victor Costello, 9. Derek Hegarty, 10 Mark McHugh, 11. Gordon D'Arcy, 12. Shane Horgan, 13. Brian O'Driscoll, 14. Denis Hickie, 15. Girvan Dempsey.; Replacements: Peter Coyle, Peter Smyth, Emmett Farrell, Leo Cullen.				Attendance: 3,424

17 December 1999	**Leinster (Ireland)**	**24–23**	**(France) Stade Français**	Donnybrook
17:30	Try: O'Driscoll; McWeeney; Con: Farrell; Pen: Farrell (3); Drop: Farrell	Report	Try: Domínguez; Pool-Jones; Con: Domínguez (2); Pen: Domínguez (3)	Attendance: 3,000
Leinster lineup: 1. Reggie Corrigan, 2. Shane Byrne, 3. Gary Halpin, 4. Bob Casey, 5. Malcolm O'Kelly, 6. Declan O'Brien, 7. Liam Toland, 8. Victor Costello, 9. Stuart Forster, 10. Emmett Farrell, 11. John McWeeney, 12. Shane Horgan, 13. Brian O'Driscoll, 14. Denis Hickie, 15. Peter McKenna.				Attendance: 3,000

7 January 2000	**Leinster (Ireland)**	**44–17**	**(Scotland) Glasgow**	Donnybrook
18:30	Try: Halpin; McKenna; McWeeney; Farrell; O'Driscoll; Hickie; Con: Farrell (4); Pen: Farrell (2)	Report	Try: Metcalfe; Simpson; Con: Hayes (2); Pen: Hayes	Attendance: 5,000
Leinster lineup: 1. Reggie Corrigan, 2. Shane Byrne, 3. Gary Halpin, 4. Bob Casey, 5. Malcolm O'Kelly, 6. Declan O'Brien, 7. Liam Toland, 8. Victor Costello, 9. Stuart Forster, 10. Emmett Farrell, 11. John McWeeney, 12. Shane Horgan, 13. Brian O'Driscoll, 14. Denis Hickie, 15. Peter McKenna.; Replacements: Mark McHugh, Peter Coyle, Trevor Brennan.				Attendance: 5,000

15 January 2000	**Leicester Tigers (England)**	**10–32**	**(Ireland) Leinster**	Welford Road
15:00	Try: Ezuliki; Lloyd	Report	Try: McWeeney; Casey; Con: Farrell (2); Pen: Farrell (5); Drop: Farrell	Attendance: 12,458
Leinster lineup: 1. Reggie Corrigan, 2. Shane Byrne, 3. Gary Halpin, 4. Bob Casey, 5. Malcolm O'Kelly, 6. Declan O'Brien, 7. Liam Toland, 8. Victor Costello, 9. Stuart Forster, 10. Emmett Farrell, 11. John McWeeney, 12. Shane Horgan, 13. Brian O'Driscoll, 14. Denis Hickie, 15. Peter McKenna.; Replacements: Peter Smyth, Peter Coyle, Leo Cullen, Trevor Brennan.				Attendance: 12,458

== Representative ==
24 August 1999	**Leinster (Ireland)**	**22-51**	**Argentina**	Donnybrook
	Try: Coyle; McKenna; Con: Everitt (2); Pen: Everitt	Report	Try: Contepomi (2); Jurado; Camardón; Orengo; Corleto; Con: Contepomi (5); Pen: Contepomi; Drop: Fernández Miranda
Leinster lineup: 1. Reggie Corrigan, 2. Shane Byrne, 3. Gary Halpin, 4. Bob Casey, 5. Brian Cusack, 6. Declan O'Brien, 7. Kieron Dawson, 8. Victor Costello, 9. Stuart Forster, 10. Barry Everitt, 11. John McWeeney, 12. Shane Horgan, 13. Rob Henderson, 14. Denis Hickie (c), 15. Emmett Farrell.; Replacements: Peter McKenna (for Hickie 31'), Gabriel Fulcher (for Cusack 50'), Liam Toland (for Dawson 60'), Peter Coyle (for Halpin).
