= 2006 Ireland rugby union tour of New Zealand and Australia =

- Manager: Eddie O'Sullivan
- Tour captain: Brian O'Driscoll
- Top test point scorer: Luke McAlister (36)
- Top test try scorer: 17 players tied with 1
Summary
P	W	D	L
Total
3	0	0	3
Test match
3	0	0	3
Opponent
P	W	D	L
New Zealand
2	0	0	2
Australia
1	0	0	1

Tour chronology
- ← Japan 2005 Argentina 2007 →

The 2006 Ireland rugby union tour of New Zealand and Australia was a series of matches played in June 2006 in New Zealand and Australia by Ireland national rugby union team.

== Touring party ==
Ireland sent a squad of 31 players on the tour.

- Manager: Eddie O'Sullivan
- Captain: Brian O'Driscoll

=== Backs ===
- Isaac Boss (Ballymena RFC/Ulster)
- Tommy Bowe (Belfast Harlequins/Ulster)
- Gordon D'Arcy (Lansdowne FC/Leinster)
- Gavin Duffy (NEC Harlequins)
- Denis Hickie (St. Mary's College RFC/Leinster)
- Shane Horgan (Lansdowne FC/Leinster)
- John Kelly (Cork Constitution/Munster)
- Geordan Murphy (Leicester Tigers)
- Brian O'Driscoll (Blackrock College RFC/Leinster)
- Ronan O'Gara (Cork Constitution/Munster)
- Jeremy Staunton (London Wasps)
- Peter Stringer (Shannon RFC/Munster)
- Andrew Trimble (Ballymena RFC/Ulster)

=== Forwards ===
- Neil Best (Belfast Harlequins/Ulster)
- Rory Best (Belfast Harlequins/Ulster)
- Peter Bracken (London Wasps)
- Leo Cullen (Leicester Tigers)
- Jerry Flannery (Shannon RFC/Munster)
- Anthony Foley (Shannon RFC/Munster)
- Keith Gleeson (St. Mary's College RFC/Leinster)
- John Hayes (Bruff RFC/Munster)
- Marcus Horan (Shannon RFC/Munster)
- Denis Leamy (Cork Constitution/Munster)
- Donncha O'Callaghan (Cork Constitution/Munster)
- Paul O'Connell (Young Munster/Munster)
- Mick O'Driscoll (Cork Constitution/Munster)
- Alan Quinlan (Shannon RFC/Munster)
- David Wallace (Garryowen/Munster)
- Bryan Young (Ballymena RFC/Ulster)

== First Test with All Blacks ==
10 June 2006
19:35

New Zealand	34–23	Ireland
Tries: Doug Howlett, Mils Muliaina, Troy Flavell; Con: Luke McAlister (2); Pen: Luke McAlister (5)	Report	Tries: Brian O'Driscoll, Andrew Trimble; Con: Ronan O'Gara (2); Pen: Ronan O'Gara (3)

Waikato Stadium, Hamilton
Attendance: 29,850
Referee: Stuart Dickinson (Australia)

New Zealand: 15.Mils Muliaina, 14.Doug Howlett, 13.Ma'a Nonu, 12.Aaron Mauger, 11.Joe Rokocoko, 10.Luke McAlister, 9.Byron Kelleher, 8.Rodney So'oialo, 7.Richie McCaw (capt.), 6.Marty Holah, 5.Greg Rawlinson, 4.Chris Jack, 3.Carl Hayman, 2.Keven Mealamu, 1.Clarke Dermody, – replacements: 17.Neemia Tialata, 18.Troy Flavell, 19.Jerome Kaino, 20.Jimmy Cowan – No entry : 16.Anton Oliver, 21.David Hill, 22.Scott Hamilton
Ireland: 15.Geordan Murphy, 14.Shane Horgan, 13.Brian O'Driscoll (capt.), 12.Gordon D'Arcy, 11.Andrew Trimble, 10.Ronan O'Gara, 9.Peter Stringer, 8.Denis Leamy, 7.David Wallace, 6.Neil Best, 5.Paul O'Connell, 4.Donncha O'Callaghan, 3.John Hayes, 2.Jerry Flannery, 1.Marcus Horan, – replacements: 16.Rory Best, 17.Bryan Young, 18.Mick O'Driscoll, 19.Keith Gleeson, 20.Isaac Boss, 21.Denis Hickie, 22.Girvan Dempsey

== Second Test with All Blacks ==
17 June 2006

New Zealand	27–17	Ireland
Tries: Clarke Dermody, Byron Kelleher, Luke McAlister; Con: Luke McAlister (3); Pen: Luke McAlister (2)	Report	Tries: Jerry Flannery, Paul O'Connell; Con: Ronan O'Gara (2); Pen: Ronan O'Gara

Eden Park, Auckland
Attendance: 45,000
Referee: Jonathan Kaplan (South Africa)

New Zealand: 15.Mils Muliaina, 14.Doug Howlett, 13.Casey Laulala, 12.Aaron Mauger, 11.Joe Rokocoko, 10.Luke McAlister, 9.Byron Kelleher, 8.Rodney So'oialo, 7.Richie McCaw (capt.), 6.Jerome Kaino, 5.Troy Flavell, 4.Chris Jack, 3.Carl Hayman, 2.Keven Mealamu, 1.Clarke Dermody, – replacements: 16.Andrew Hore, 17.Neemia Tialata, 18.Greg Rawlinson, 19.Craig Newby, 20.Jimmy Cowan, 21.David Hill, 22.Ma'a Nonu
Ireland: 15.Geordan Murphy, 14.Shane Horgan, 13.Brian O'Driscoll (capt.), 12.Gordon D'Arcy, 11.Andrew Trimble, 10.Ronan O'Gara, 9.Peter Stringer, 8.Denis Leamy, 7.David Wallace, 6.Neil Best, 5.Paul O'Connell, 4.Donncha O'Callaghan, 3.John Hayes, 2.Jerry Flannery, 1.Marcus Horan, – replacements: 16.Rory Best, 17.Bryan Young, 18.Mick O'Driscoll, 19.Keith Gleeson, 20.Isaac Boss, 21.Denis Hickie, 22.Girvan Dempsey

== Test against Wallabies ==
24 June 2006
18:00

Australia	37–15	Ireland
Tries: Chris Latham, Mark Gerrard, Greg Holmes, George Gregan, Cameron Shepherd; Con: Stirling Mortlock (3); Pen: Stirling Mortlock (2)	Report	Tries: Ronan O'Gara, Neil Best; Con: Ronan O'Gara; Pen: Ronan O'Gara

Subiaco Oval, Perth
Attendance: 38,200
Referee: Kelvin Deaker (New Zealand)

Australia: 15.Chris Latham, 14.Mark Gerrard, 13.Stirling Mortlock, 12.Mat Rogers, 11.Lote Tuqiri, 10.Stephen Larkham, 9.George Gregan (capt), 8.Rocky Elsom, 7.George Smith, 6.Mark Chisholm, 5.Dan Vickerman, 4.Nathan Sharpe, 3.Guy Shepherdson, 2.Tai McIsaac, 1.Greg Holmes, – replacements: 16.Jeremy Paul, 17.Al Baxter, 18.Wycliff Palu, 19.Phil Waugh, 20.Sam Cordingley, 21.Clyde Rathbone, 22.Cameron Shepherd
Ireland: 15.Girvan Dempsey, 14.Shane Horgan, 13.Brian O'Driscoll (capt.), 12.Gordon D'Arcy, 11.Andrew Trimble, 10.Ronan O'Gara, 9.Peter Stringer, 8.Denis Leamy, 7.David Wallace, 6.Neil Best, 5.Paul O'Connell, 4.Donncha O'Callaghan, 3.John Hayes, 2.Jerry Flannery, 1.Marcus Horan, – replacements: 16.Rory Best, 17.Bryan Young, 18.Mick O'Driscoll, 19.Keith Gleeson, 20.Isaac Boss, 21.Jeremy Staunton, 22.Geordan Murphy

== See also ==
- History of rugby union matches between All Blacks and Ireland
- History of rugby union matches between Australia and Ireland
