= List of international rugby union caps for Brian O'Driscoll =

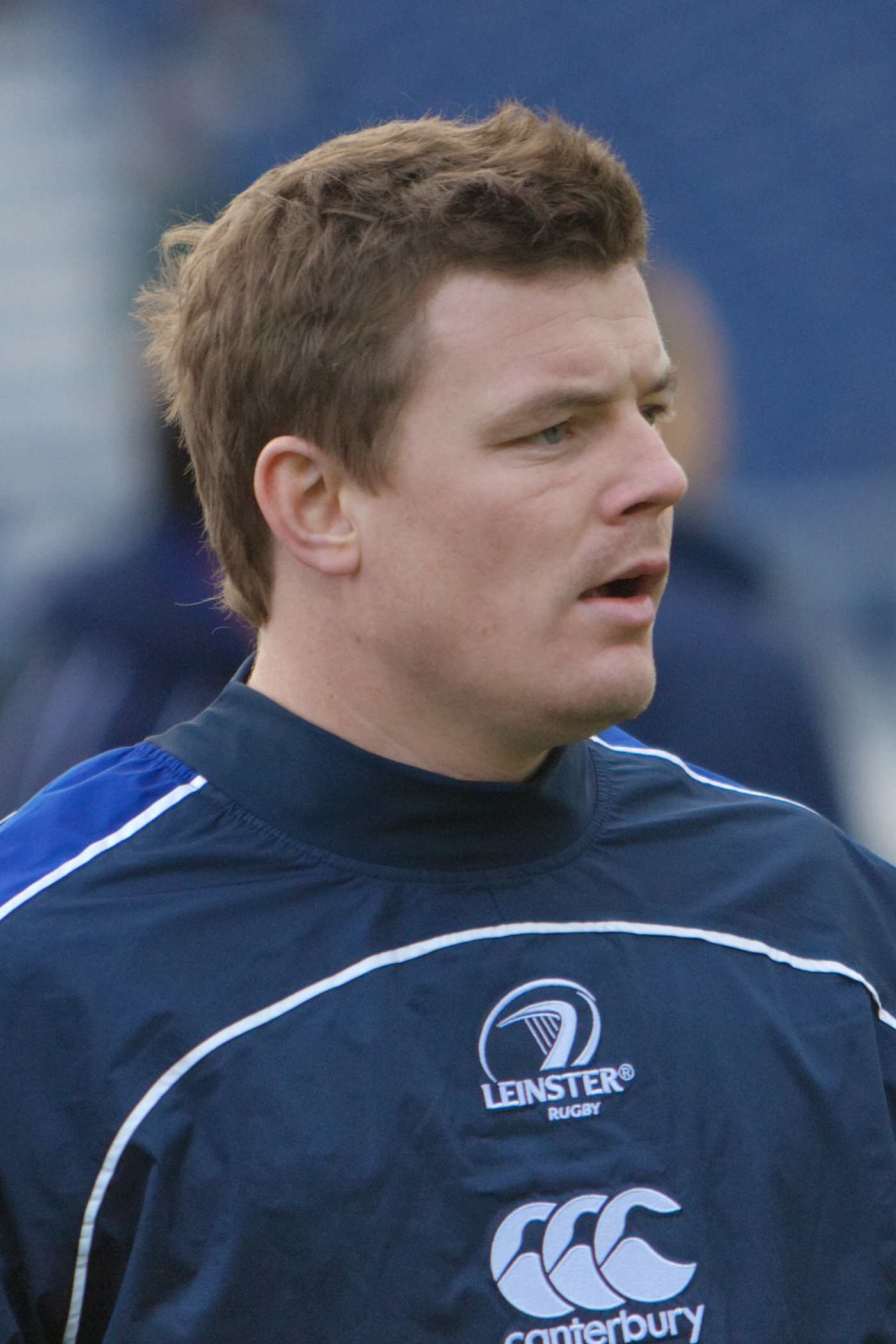
Brian O'Driscoll, the former world record holder for the most international rugby union caps

Brian O'Driscoll is an Irish rugby union player who has 141 caps to his name; 133 for Ireland and 8 for the British & Irish Lions. He is currently the fourth most capped player in the world behind Richie McCaw, Sergio Parisse and Alun Wyn Jones. He earned his first Irish cap playing against Australia on the 12 June 1999 at Ballymore Stadium in Brisbane, before ending his international career on the 15 March 2014 against France at the Stade de France. In his 133 caps for Ireland, he has only played once of the bench; against Romania on 15 October 1999. In total, he has represented Ireland on 65 occasions in either the Five or Six Nations Championship, and have played in 4 Rugby World Cup tournaments, playing in 17 matches. He has scored 46 tries for his national side, a current record for the Irish team, and with his 5 drop goals, he has scored 245 points for Ireland.

In addition to Ireland, he also represented the British & Irish Lions on four tours. He earned his first Lions cap against Australia as part of the 2001 British & Irish Lions tour to Australia, where he played in every test match. He was named captain for the 2005 British & Irish Lions tour to New Zealand, but was injured just minutes into the opening test against the All Blacks. He made a formidable partnership with Welsh Centre Jamie Roberts on the 2009 British & Irish Lions tour to South Africa, playing in the opening two tests of the test series. Despite the expected retirement of O'Driscoll at the end of the 2012–13 season, O'Driscoll was selected for his fourth British and Irish Lion for the 2013 British & Irish Lions tour to Australia. On this tour, he played in the opening two tests against the Wallabies, but was dropped for the final test, which led to much criticism for head coach Warren Gatland.

== Key ==
- Comp denotes competition/tournament.
- Pts denotes points.
- Conv denotes conversions.
- Pen denotes penalties.
- Drop denotes drop goal.
- Repl. denotes matches that O'Driscoll was replaced in a match.
- Won denotes that the match was won by the side O'Driscoll was playing for.
- Lost denotes that the match was lost by the side O'Driscoll was playing for.
- Draw denotes that the match was drawn.
- Yellow denotes matches in which O'Driscoll was captain.

== International caps ==
Cap	Date	Venue	Comp	Team	Opposition	Pts	Tries	Conv	Pen	Drop	Result	Repl	Temporarily suspended
1	12 June 1999	Ballymore Stadium, Brisbane	1999 summer tour	Ireland	Australia	0	0	0	0	0	Lost	–	0
2	19 June 1999	Subiaco Oval, Perth	1999 summer tour	Ireland	Australia	0	0	0	0	0	Lost	–	0
3	28 August 1999	Lansdowne Road, Dublin	1999 RWC warm-up	Ireland	Argentina	0	0	0	0	0	Won	–	0
4	2 October 1999	Lansdowne Road, Dublin	1999 Rugby World Cup	Ireland	United States	5	1	0	0	0	Won	–	0
5	10 October 1999	Lansdowne Road, Dublin	1999 Rugby World Cup	Ireland	Australia	0	0	0	0	0	Lost	–	0
6	15 October 1999	Lansdowne Road, Dublin	1999 Rugby World Cup	Ireland	Romania	3	0	0	0	1	Won	Substituted on	0
7	20 October 1999	Stade Félix-Bollaert, Lens	1999 Rugby World Cup	Ireland	Argentina	0	0	0	0	0	Lost	–	0
8	5 February 2000	Twickenham, London	2000 Six Nations	Ireland	England	0	0	0	0	0	Lost	–	0
9	19 February 2000	Lansdowne Road, Dublin	2000 Six Nations	Ireland	Scotland	5	1	0	0	0	Won	–	0
10	4 March 2000	Lansdowne Road, Dublin	2000 Six Nations	Ireland	Italy	5	1	0	0	0	Won	–	0
11	19 March 2000	Stade de France, Saint-Denis	2000 Six Nations	Ireland	France	15	3	0	0	0	Won	–	0
12	1 April 2000	Lansdowne Road, Dublin	2000 Six Nations	Ireland	Wales	0	0	0	0	0	Lost	–	0
13	11 November 2000	Lansdowne Road, Dublin	2000 end-of-year tests	Ireland	Japan	10	2	0	0	0	Won	–	0
14	1 April 2000	Lansdowne Road, Dublin	2000 end-of-year tests	Ireland	South Africa	0	0	0	0	0	Lost	–	0
15	17 February 2001	Lansdowne Road, Dublin	2001 Six Nations	Ireland	France	5	1	0	0	0	Won	–	0
16	30 June 2001	The Gabba, Brisbane	2001 B & I Lions tour	Lions	Australia	5	1	0	0	0	Won	Substituted off	0
17	7 July 2001	Colonial Stadium, Melbourne	2001 B & I Lions tour	Lions	Australia	0	0	0	0	0	Lost	–	0
18	14 July 2001	Stadium Australia, Sydney	2001 B & I Lions tour	Lions	Australia	0	0	0	0	0	Lost	–	0
19	22 September 2001	Murrayfield, Edinburgh	2001 Six Nations	Ireland	Scotland	0	0	0	0	0	Lost	–	0
20	13 October 2001	Millennium Stadium, Cardiff	2001 Six Nations	Ireland	Wales	5	1	0	0	0	Won	–	0
21	20 October 2001	Lansdowne Road, Dublin	2001 Six Nations	Ireland	England	0	0	0	0	0	Won	Substituted off	0
22	11 November 2001	Lansdowne Road, Dublin	2001 end-of-year tests	Ireland	Samoa	0	0	0	0	0	Won	–	0
23	17 November 2001	Lansdowne Road, Dublin	2001 end-of-year tests	Ireland	New Zealand	0	0	0	0	0	Lost	–	0
24	3 February 2002	Lansdowne Road, Dublin	2002 Six Nations	Ireland	Wales	0	0	0	0	0	Won	–	0
25	16 February 2002	Twickenham, London	2002 Six Nations	Ireland	England	0	0	0	0	0	Lost	–	0
26	2 March 2002	Lansdowne Road, Dublin	2002 Six Nations	Ireland	Scotland	15	3	0	0	0	Won	–	0
27	23 March 2002	Lansdowne Road, Dublin	2002 Six Nations	Ireland	Italy	0	0	0	0	0	Won	–	0
28	6 April 2002	Stade de France, Saint-Denis	2002 Six Nations	Ireland	France	0	0	0	0	0	Lost	–	0
29	15 June 2002	Carisbrook, Dunedin	2002 summer tour	Ireland	New Zealand	3	0	0	0	1	Lost	–	0
30	22 June 2002	Eden Park, Auckland	2002 summer tour	Ireland	New Zealand	3	0	0	0	1	Lost	–	0
31	7 September 2002	Thomond Park, Limerick	Test match	Ireland	Romania	5	1	0	0	0	Won	Substituted off	0
32	21 September 2002	Central Stadium, Krasnoyarsk	2003 RWC Qualification	Ireland	Russia	0	0	0	0	0	Won	–	0
33	28 September 2002	Lansdowne Road, Dublin	2003 RWC Qualification	Ireland	Georgia	10	2	0	0	0	Won	–	0
34	9 November 2002	Lansdowne Road, Dublin	2002 end-of-year tests	Ireland	Australia	0	0	0	0	0	Won	–	0
35	17 November 2002	Lansdowne Road, Dublin	2002 end-of-year tests	Ireland	Fiji	5	1	0	0	0	Won	Substituted off	0
36	23 November 2002	Lansdowne Road, Dublin	2002 end-of-year tests	Ireland	Argentina	0	0	0	0	0	Won	–	0
37	16 February 2003	Murrayfield, Edinburgh	2003 Six Nations	Ireland	Scotland	0	0	0	0	0	Won	Substituted off	0
38	22 February 2003	Stadio Flaminio, Rome	2003 Six Nations	Ireland	Italy	5	1	0	0	0	Won	–	0
39	8 March 2003	Lansdowne Road, Dublin	2003 Six Nations	Ireland	France	0	0	0	0	0	Won	–	0
40	22 March 2003	Millennium Stadium, Cardiff	2003 Six Nations	Ireland	Wales	0	0	0	0	0	Won	–	0
41	30 March 2003	Lansdowne Road, Dublin	2003 Six Nations	Ireland	England	0	0	0	0	0	Lost	Substituted off	0
42	16 August 2003	Lansdowne Road, Dublin	2003 RWC warm-ups	Ireland	Wales	0	0	0	0	0	Won	–	0
43	30 August 2003	Thomond Park, Limerick	2003 RWC warm-ups	Ireland	Italy	0	0	0	0	0	Won	Substituted off	0
44	6 September 2003	Murrayfield, Edinburgh	2003 RWC warm-ups	Ireland	Scotland	0	0	0	0	0	Won	Substituted off	0
45	11 October 2003	Central Coast Stadium, Gosford	2003 Rugby World Cup	Ireland	Romania	0	0	0	0	0	Won	Substituted off	0
46	19 October 2003	Aussie Stadium, Sydney	2003 Rugby World Cup	Ireland	Namibia	0	0	0	0	0	Won	–	0
47	26 October 2003	Adelaide Oval, Adelaide	2003 Rugby World Cup	Ireland	Argentina	0	0	0	0	0	Won	–	0
48	1 November 2003	Telstra Dome, Melbourne	2003 Rugby World Cup	Ireland	Australia	8	1	0	0	1	Lost	–	0
49	9 November 2003	Telstra Dome, Melbourne	2003 Rugby World Cup	Ireland	France	10	2	0	0	0	Lost	–	0
50	22 February 2004	Lansdowne Road, Dublin	2004 Six Nations	Ireland	Wales	10	2	0	0	0	Won	Substituted off	0
51	6 March 2004	Twickenham, London	2004 Six Nations	Ireland	England	0	0	0	0	0	Won	–	0
52	20 March 2004	Lansdowne Road, Dublin	2004 Six Nations	Ireland	Italy	5	1	0	0	0	Won	–	1
53 (50th IRE Cap)	27 March 2004	Lansdowne Road, Dublin	2004 Six Nations	Ireland	Scotland	0	0	0	0	0	Won	–	0
54	12 June 2004	Vodacom Park, Blomfontein	2004 summer tour	Ireland	South Africa	0	0	0	0	0	Lost	–	0
55	19 June 2004	Newlands, Cape Town	2004 summer tour	Ireland	South Africa	5	1	0	0	0	Lost	–	0
56	13 November 2004	Lansdowne Road, Dublin	2004 end-of-year tests	Ireland	South Africa	0	0	0	0	0	Won	–	0
57	20 November 2004	Lansdowne Road, Dublin	2004 end-of-year tests	Ireland	United States	0	0	0	0	0	Won	Substituted off	0
58	27 November 2004	Lansdowne Road, Dublin	2004 end-of-year tests	Ireland	Argentina	0	0	0	0	0	Won	–	0
59	6 February 2005	Stadio Flaminio, Rome	2005 Six Nations	Ireland	Italy	0	0	0	0	0	Won	–	0
60	27 February 2005	Lansdowne Road, Dublin	2005 Six Nations	Ireland	England	5	1	0	0	0	Won	–	0
61	12 March 2005	Lansdowne Road, Dublin	2005 Six Nations	Ireland	France	5	1	0	0	0	Lost	–	0
62	19 March 2005	Millennium Stadium, Cardiff	2005 Six Nations	Ireland	Wales	0	0	0	0	0	Lost	–	0
63	25 June 2005	Lancaster Park, Christchurch	2005 B & I Lions tour	Lions	New Zealand	0	0	0	0	0	Lost	Substituted off	0
64	4 February 2006	Lansdowne Road, Dublin	2006 Six Nations	Ireland	Italy	0	0	0	0	0	Won	–	0
65	11 February 2006	Stade de France, Saint-Denis	2006 Six Nations	Ireland	France	0	0	0	0	0	Lost	Substituted off	0
66	26 February 2006	Lansdowne Road, Dublin	2006 Six Nations	Ireland	Wales	0	0	0	0	0	Won	–	0
67	11 March 2006	Lansdowne Road, Dublin	2006 Six Nations	Ireland	Scotland	0	0	0	0	0	Won	–	0
68	18 March 2006	Twickenham, London	2006 Six Nations	Ireland	England	0	0	0	0	0	Won	–	0
69	10 June 2006	Waikato Stadium, Hamilton	2006 summer tour	Ireland	New Zealand	5	1	0	0	0	Lost	–	0
70	17 June 2006	Eden Park, Auckland	2006 summer tour	Ireland	New Zealand	0	0	0	0	0	Lost	–	0
71	24 June 2006	Subiaco Oval, Perth	2006 summer tour	Ireland	Australia	0	0	0	0	0	Lost	–	0
72	11 November 2006	Lansdowne Road, Dublin	2006 end-of-year tests	Ireland	South Africa	0	0	0	0	0	Won	–	0
73	19 November 2006	Lansdowne Road, Dublin	2006 end-of-year tests	Ireland	Australia	0	0	0	0	0	Won	–	0
74	26 November 2006	Lansdowne Road, Dublin	2006 end-of-year tests	Ireland	Pacific Islanders	0	0	0	0	0	Won	Substituted off	0
75	4 February 2007	Millennium Stadium, Cardiff	2007 Six Nations	Ireland	Wales	5	1	0	0	0	Won	Substituted off	0
76	24 February 2007	Croke Park, Dublin	2007 Six Nations	Ireland	England	0	0	0	0	0	Won	Substituted off	0
77	24 February 2007	Murrayfield, Edinburgh	2007 Six Nations	Ireland	Scotland	0	0	0	0	0	Won	–	0
78	17 March 2007	Stadio Flaminio, Rome	2007 Six Nations	Ireland	Italy	0	0	0	0	0	Won	Substituted off	0
79	11 August 2007	Murrayfield, Edinburgh	2007 RWC warm-ups	Ireland	Scotland	0	0	0	0	0	Lost	Substituted off	0
80	9 September 2007	Stade Chaban-Delmas, Bordeaux	2007 Rugby World Cup	Ireland	Namibia	5	1	0	0	0	Won	Substituted off	0
81	15 September 2007	Stade Chaban-Delmas, Bordeaux	2007 Rugby World Cup	Ireland	Georgia	0	0	0	0	0	Won	–	0
82	21 September 2007	Stade de France, Saint-Denis	2007 Rugby World Cup	Ireland	France	0	0	0	0	0	Lost	–	0
83	30 September 2007	Parc des Princes, Paris	2007 Rugby World Cup	Ireland	Argentina	5	1	0	0	0	Lost	–	0
84	2 February 2008	Croke Park, Dublin	2008 Six Nations	Ireland	Italy	0	0	0	0	0	Won	–	0
85	9 February 2008	Stade de France, Saint-Denis	2008 Six Nations	Ireland	France	0	0	0	0	0	Lost	–	0
86	23 February 2008	Croke Park, Dublin	2008 Six Nations	Ireland	Scotland	0	0	0	0	0	Won	Substituted off	0
87	8 March 2008	Croke Park, Dublin	2008 Six Nations	Ireland	Wales	0	0	0	0	0	Lost	Substituted off	0
88	7 June 2008	Westpac Stadium, Wellington	2008 summer tour	Ireland	New Zealand	0	0	0	0	0	Lost	–	0
89	14 June 2008	Telstra Dome, Melbourne	2008 summer tour	Ireland	Australia	0	0	0	0	0	Lost	Substituted off	0
90	8 November 2008	Thomond Park, Limerick	2008 end-of-year tests	Ireland	Canada	0	0	0	0	0	Won	Substituted off	0
91	15 November 2008	Croke Park, Dublin	2008 end-of-year tests	Ireland	New Zealand	0	0	0	0	0	Lost	–	0
92	22 November 2008	Croke Park, Dublin	2008 end-of-year tests	Ireland	Argentina	0	0	0	0	0	Won	–	0
93	7 February 2009	Croke Park, Dublin	2009 Six Nations	Ireland	France	5	1	0	0	0	Won	–	0
94	15 February 2009	Stadio Flaminio, Rome	2009 Six Nations	Ireland	Italy	5	1	0	0	0	Won	–	0
95	28 February 2009	Croke Park, Dublin	2009 Six Nations	Ireland	England	8	1	0	0	1	Won	–	0
96	28 February 2009	Murrayfield, Edinburgh	2009 Six Nations	Ireland	Scotland	0	0	0	0	0	Won	–	0
97	28 February 2009	Millennium Stadium, Cardiff	2009 Six Nations	Ireland	Wales	5	1	0	0	0	Won	–	0
98	20 June 2009	ABSA Stadium, Durban	2009 B & I Lions tour	Lions	South Africa	0	0	0	0	0	Lost	–	0
99	20 June 2009	Loftus Versfeld, Pretoria	2009 B & I Lions tour	Lions	South Africa	0	0	0	0	0	Lost	–	0
100	15 November 2009	Croke Park, Dublin	2009 end-of-year tests	Ireland	Australia	5	1	0	0	0	Draw	–	0
101	21 November 2009	RDS Arena, Dublin	2009 end-of-year tests	Ireland	Fiji	5	1	0	0	0	Won	Substituted off	0
102	28 November 2009	Croke Park, Dublin	2009 end-of-year tests	Ireland	South Africa	0	0	0	0	0	Won	Substituted off	0
103	6 February 2010	Croke Park, Dublin	2010 Six Nations	Ireland	Italy	0	0	0	0	0	Won	–	0
104	13 February 2010	Stade de France, Saint-Denis	2010 Six Nations	Ireland	France	0	0	0	0	0	Lost	–	0
105	27 February 2010	Twickenham, London	2010 Six Nations	Ireland	England	0	0	0	0	0	Won	Substituted off	0
106 (100th IRE Cap)	13 March 2010	Croke Park, Dublin	2010 Six Nations	Ireland	Wales	0	0	0	0	0	Won	–	0
107	20 March 2010	Croke Park, Dublin	2010 Six Nations	Ireland	Scotland	5	1	0	0	0	Lost	–	0
108	12 June 2010	Yarrow Stadium, New Plymouth	2010 summer tour	Ireland	New Zealand	5	1	0	0	0	Lost	–	0
109	26 June 2010	Suncorp Stadium, Brisbane	2010 summer tour	Ireland	Australia	0	0	0	0	0	Lost	–	0
110	6 November 2010	Aviva Stadium, Dublin	2010 end-of-year tests	Ireland	South Africa	0	0	0	0	0	Lost	–	0
111	13 November 2010	Aviva Stadium, Dublin	2010 end-of-year tests	Ireland	Samoa	0	0	0	0	0	Won	–	0
112	20 November 2010	Aviva Stadium, Dublin	2010 end-of-year tests	Ireland	New Zealand	5	1	0	0	0	Lost	–	0
113	28 November 2010	Aviva Stadium, Dublin	2010 end-of-year tests	Ireland	Argentina	0	0	0	0	0	Won	Substituted off	0
114	5 February 2011	Stadio Flaminio, Rome	2011 Six Nations	Ireland	Italy	5	1	0	0	0	Won	–	0
115	13 February 2011	Aviva Stadium, Dublin	2011 Six Nations	Ireland	France	0	0	0	0	0	Lost	–	0
116	27 February 2011	Murrayfield, Edinburgh	2011 Six Nations	Ireland	Scotland	0	0	0	0	0	Won	–	0
117	12 March 2011	Millennium Stadium, Cardiff	2011 Six Nations	Ireland	Wales	5	1	0	0	0	Lost	–	0
118	19 March 2011	Aviva Stadium, Dublin	2011 Six Nations	Ireland	England	5	1	0	0	0	Won	–	0
119	20 August 2011	Aviva Stadium, Dublin	2011 RWC warm-ups	Ireland	France	0	0	0	0	0	Lost	–	0
120	11 September 2011	Stadium Taranaki, New Plymouth	2011 Rugby World Cup	Ireland	United States	0	0	0	0	0	Won	–	0
121	17 September 2011	Eden Park, Auckland	2011 Rugby World Cup	Ireland	Australia	0	0	0	0	0	Won	–	0
122	2 October 2011	Forsyth Barr Stadium, Dunedin	2011 Rugby World Cup	Ireland	Italy	5	1	0	0	0	Won	Substituted off	0
123	8 October 2011	Westpac Stadium, Wellington	2011 Rugby World Cup	Ireland	Wales	0	0	0	0	0	Lost	–	0
124	9 June 2012	Eden Park, Auckland	2012 summer tour	Ireland	New Zealand	0	0	0	0	0	Lost	–	0
125	16 June 2012	Rugby League Park, Christchurch	2012 summer tour	Ireland	New Zealand	0	0	0	0	0	Lost	–	0
126	23 June 2012	Waikato Stadium, Hamilton	2012 summer tour	Ireland	New Zealand	0	0	0	0	0	Lost	–	0
127	2 February 2013	Millennium Stadium, Cardiff	2013 Six Nations	Ireland	Wales	5	1	0	0	0	Won	–	0
128	10 February 2013	Aviva Stadium, Dublin	2013 Six Nations	Ireland	England	0	0	0	0	0	Lost	–	0
129	24 February 2013	Murrayfield, Edinburgh	2013 Six Nations	Ireland	Scotland	0	0	0	0	0	Lost	–	0
130	9 March 2013	Aviva Stadium, Dublin	2013 Six Nations	Ireland	France	0	0	0	0	0	Draw	–	0
131	16 March 2013	Stadio Olimpico, Rome	2013 Six Nations	Ireland	Italy	0	0	0	0	0	Lost	–	1
132	22 June 2013	Suncorp Stadium, Brisbane	2013 B & I Lions tour	Lions	Australia	0	0	0	0	0	Won	–	0
133	29 June 2013	Etihad Stadium, Melbourne	2013 B & I Lions tour	Lions	Australia	0	0	0	0	0	Lost	–	0
134	9 November 2013	Aviva Stadium, Dublin	2013 end-of-year tests	Ireland	Samoa	0	0	0	0	0	Won	Substituted off	0
135	16 November 2013	Aviva Stadium, Dublin	2013 end-of-year tests	Ireland	Australia	0	0	0	0	0	Lost	–	0
136	24 November 2013	Aviva Stadium, Dublin	2013 end-of-year tests	Ireland	New Zealand	0	0	0	0	0	Lost	Substituted off	0
137	2 February 2014	Aviva Stadium, Dublin	2014 Six Nations	Ireland	Scotland	0	0	0	0	0	Won	Substituted off	0
138	8 February 2014	Aviva Stadium, Dublin	2014 Six Nations	Ireland	Wales	0	0	0	0	0	Won	–	0
139	22 February 2014	Twickenham, London	2014 Six Nations	Ireland	England	0	0	0	0	0	Lost	Substituted off	0
140	8 March 2014	Aviva Stadium, Dublin	2014 Six Nations	Ireland	Italy	0	0	0	0	0	Won	Substituted off	0
141	15 March 2014	Stade de France, Saint-Denis	2014 Six Nations	Ireland	France	0	0	0	0	0	Won	–	0

== Overall ==
=== By country ===
Opponent	Played	Won	Drawn	Lost	Win %	Pts	Tries	Conv	Pen	Drop
Argentina	8	6	0	2	75.00	5	1	0	0	0
Australia	17	5	1	11	29.41	23	4	0	0	1
Canada	1	1	0	0	100.00	0	0	0	0	0
England	13	8	0	5	61.54	18	3	0	0	1
Fiji	2	2	0	0	100.00	10	2	0	0	0
France	15	5	1	9	33.33	40	8	0	0	0
Georgia	2	2	0	0	100.00	10	2	0	0	0
Italy	15	14	0	1	93.33	30	6	0	0	0
Japan	1	1	0	0	100.00	10	2	0	0	0
Namibia	2	2	0	0	100.00	10	2	0	0	0
New Zealand	14	0	0	14	0.00	21	3	0	0	2
Pacific Islanders	1	1	0	0	100.00	0	0	0	0	0
Romania	3	3	0	0	100.00	8	1	0	0	1
South Africa	9	3	0	6	33.33	5	1	0	0	0
Russia	1	1	0	0	100.00	0	0	0	0	0
Samoa	3	3	0	0	100.00	0	0	0	0	0
Scotland	15	11	0	4	73.33	25	5	0	0	0
United States	3	3	0	0	100.00	5	1	0	0	0
Wales	16	11	0	5	68.75	35	7	0	0	0
Total	141	82	2	57	58.16	250	47	0	0	5

=== By stadium ===
Stadium	Played	Won	Drawn	Lost	Win %
(South Africa) ABSA Stadium, Durban	1	0	0	1	0.00
(Australia) Adelaide Oval, Adelaide	1	1	0	0	100.00
(Australia) Aussie Stadium, Sydney	1	1	0	0	100.00
(Ireland) Aviva Stadium, Dublin	15	7	1	7	46.67
(Australia) Ballymore Stadium, Brisbane	1	0	0	1	0.00
(New Zealand) Carisbrook, Dunedin	1	0	0	1	0.00
(Australia) Central Coast Stadium, Gosford	1	1	0	0	100.00
(Russia) Central Stadium, Krasnoyarsk	1	1	0	0	100.00
(Ireland) Croke Park, Dublin	13	9	1	3	69.23
(New Zealand) Eden Park, Auckland	4	1	0	3	25.00
Etihad Stadium (Australia) Colonial Stadium, Melbourne; Telstra Dome	5	0	0	5	0.00
(New Zealand) Forsyth Barr Stadium, Dunedin	1	1	0	0	100.00
(New Zealand) Lancaster Park, Christchurch	1	1	0	0	100.00
(Ireland) Lansdowne Road, Dublin	37	31	0	6	83.78
(South Africa) Loftus Versfeld, Pretoria	1	0	0	1	0.00
(Wales) Millennium Stadium, Cardiff	7	5	0	2	71.43
(Scotland) Murrayfield, Edinburgh	8	5	0	3	62.50
(South Africa) Newlands, Cape Town	1	0	0	1	0.00
(France) Parc des Princes, Paris	1	0	0	1	0.00
(Ireland) RDS Arena, Dublin	1	1	0	0	100.00
(New Zealand) Rugby League Park, Christchurch	1	0	0	1	0.00
(France) Stade Chaban-Delmas, Bordeaux	2	2	0	0	100.00
Stade de France, Saint-Denis	7	2	0	5	28.86
(France) Stade Felix Bollaert, Lens	1	0	0	1	0.00
(Italy) Stadio Flaminio, Rome	5	5	0	0	100.00
(Italy) Stadio Olimpico, Rome	1	0	0	1	0.00
Stadium Australia, Sydney	1	0	0	1	0.00
(Australia) Subiaco Oval, Perth	2	0	0	2	0.00
(Australia) Suncorp Stadium, Brisbane	2	1	0	1	50.00
(Australia) The Gabba, Brisbane	1	1	0	0	100.00
(Ireland) Thomond Park, Limerick	3	3	0	0	100.00
(England) Twickenham, London	6	3	0	3	50.00
(South Africa) Vodacom Park, Blomfontein	1	0	0	1	0.00
(New Zealand) Waikato Stadium, Hamilton	2	0	0	2	0.00
(New Zealand) Westpac Stadium, Wellington	2	0	0	2	0.00
Yarrow Stadium (New Zealand) Stadium Taranaki, New Plymouth	2	1	0	1	50.00

== See also ==
- List of rugby union test caps leaders
- List of leading rugby union test try scorers
- List of leading international rugby union drop goal scorers
