= 2002 Ireland rugby union tour of New Zealand =

- Coach: Eddie O'Sullivan
- Tour captain: Keith Wood
- Top point scorer: Brian O'Driscoll (21)
- Top try scorer: Two players tied with 3
- Top test point scorer: Andrew Mehrtens (20)
- Top test try scorer: Leon MacDonald (3)
Summary
P	W	D	L
Total
3	1	0	2
Test match
2	0	0	2
Opponent
P	W	D	L
New Zealand
2	0	0	2

Tour chronology
- ← Americas 2000 Southern Hemisphere 2003 →

== Touring party ==
- Manager: Brian O'Brien
- Coach: Eddie O'Sullivan
- Assistant coach: Declan Kidney
- Captain: Keith Wood

=== Backs ===
- Justin Bishop (London Irish)
- Girvan Dempsey (Terenure College/Leinster)
- Mel Deane (Sale Sharks)
- Guy Easterby (Llanelli Scarlets)
- Tyrone Howe (Dungannon/Ulster)
- David Humphreys (Dungannon/Ulster)
- John Kelly (Cork Constitution/Munster)
- Geordan Murphy (Leicester Tigers)
- Brian O'Driscoll (Blackrock College/Leinster)
- Ronan O'Gara (Cork Constitution/Munster)
- John O'Neill (Munster)
- Peter Stringer (Shannon/Munster)

=== Forwards ===
- Shane Byrne (Blackrock College/Leinster)
- Reggie Corrigan (Lansdowne/Leinster)
- Leo Cullen (Blackrock College/Leinster)
- Simon Easterby (Llanelli Scarlets)
- Anthony Foley (Shannon/Munster)
- Keith Gleeson (St. Mary's College/Leinster)
- John Hayes (Shannon/Munster)
- Marcus Horan (Shannon/Munster)
- Gary Longwell (Ballymena/Ulster)
- Eric Miller (Terenure College/Leinster)
- Paul O'Connell (Young Munster/Munster)
- Malcolm O'Kelly (St. Mary's College/Leinster)
- Alan Quinlan (Shannon/Munster)
- Paul Wallace (Blackrock College/Leinster)
- Keith Wood (NEC Harlequins)

== Matches ==
8 June 2002

Divisional XV (New Zealand)	3–56	Ireland XV
Pen: Flutey	Report	Try: O'Driscoll (3); Humphreys; Bishop; Dempsey; Foley; Deane; Murphy; Con: Humphreys (4); Pen: Humphreys

Fraser Park, Timaru
Referee: Steve Walsh (New Zealand)

15 June 2002

New Zealand	15–6	Ireland
Try: Howlett; MacDonald; Con: Mehrtens; Pen: Mehrtens	Report	Pen: O'Gara; Drop: O'Driscoll

Carisbrook, Dunedin
Attendance: 30,000
Referee: Joel Jutge (France)

New Zealand: 15. Leon MacDonald, 14. Doug Howlett, 13. Tana Umaga, 12. Aaron Mauger, 11. Caleb Ralph, 10. Andrew Mehrtens, 9. Justin Marshall, 8. Scott Robertson, 7. Richie McCaw, 6. Reuben Thorne (c), 5. Norm Maxwell, 4. Chris Jack, 3. Greg Somerville, 2. Mark Hammett, 1. Dave Hewett – Replacements: Daryl Gibson, Joe McDonnell, Jonah Lomu – Unused: Tom Willis, Taine Randell, Marty Holah, Byron Kelleher

Ireland: 15. Girvan Dempsey, 14. Geordan Murphy, 13. Brian O'Driscoll, 12. John Kelly, 11. Justin Bishop, 10. Ronan O'Gara, 9. Peter Stringer, 8. Anthony Foley, 7. Keith Gleeson, 6. Simon Easterby, 5. Paul O'Connell, 4. Gary Longwell, 3. John Hayes, 2. Keith Wood (c), 1. Reggie Corrigan – Replacements: Malcolm O'Kelly, David Humphreys – Unused: Shane Byrne, Paul Wallace, Alan Quinlan, Guy Easterby, Mel Deane

22 June 2002

New Zealand	40–8	Ireland
Try: MacDonald (2); Ralph; Kelleher; Holah; Con: Mehrtens (3); Pen: Mehrtens (3)	Report	Try: Longwell; Drop: O'Driscoll

Eden Park, Auckland
Referee: Tappe Henning (South Africa)

New Zealand: 15. Leon MacDonald, 14. Jonah Lomu, 13. Mark Robinson, 12. Aaron Mauger, 11. Caleb Ralph, 10. Andrew Mehrtens, 9. Justin Marshall, 8. Scott Robertson, 7. Richie McCaw, 6. Reuben Thorne (c), 5. Norm Maxwell, 4. Chris Jack, 3. Greg Somerville, 2. Mark Hammett, 1. Dave Hewett – Replacements: 17. Joe McDonnell, 18. Simon Maling, 19. Marty Holah, 20. Byron Kelleher, 21. Daryl Gibson, 22. Doug Howlett – Unused: Tom Willis

Ireland: 15. Girvan Dempsey, 14. Geordan Murphy, 13. Brian O'Driscoll, 12. John Kelly, 11. Justin Bishop, 10. Ronan O'Gara, 9. Peter Stringer, 8. Anthony Foley, 7. Keith Gleeson, 6. Simon Easterby, 5. Malcolm O'Kelly, 4. Gary Longwell, 3. John Hayes, 2. Keith Wood (c), 1. Reggie Corrigan – Replacements: 16. Shane Byrne, 17. Paul Wallace, 18. Leo Cullen, 19. Alan Quinlan (yellow card) , 21. David Humphreys – Unused: 20. Guy Easterby, 22. Mel Deane

== See also ==
- History of rugby union matches between Ireland and New Zealand
