= 2010 Ireland rugby union tour of New Zealand and Australia =

- Coach: Declan Kidney
- Tour captain: Brian O'Driscoll
- Top point scorer: Johnny Sexton (40)
- Top try scorer: 5 players with 1 try
- Top test point scorer: Johnny Sexton (17)
- Top test try scorer: 4 players with 1 try
Summary
P	W	D	L
Total
3	0	0	3
Test match
2	0	0	2
Opponent
P	W	D	L
Australia
1	0	0	1
New Zealand
1	0	0	1

Tour chronology
- ← Canada and USA 2009 New Zealand 2012 →

Ireland toured New Zealand and Australia in June 2010, playing a Test match against the All Blacks and the Wallabies. They also played the New Zealand Māori in Rotorua.

== Touring squad ==
Ireland named a 34-man squad for their tour to New Zealand and Australia in June 2010. Rory Best and Paul O'Connell were both ruled out due to injury and replaced by John Fogarty and Ed O'Donoghue. Kevin McLaughlin was also ruled out and was replaced by Niall Ronan. Keith Earls had to pull out of the squad and was replaced by Gavin Duffy. Fergus McFadden was ruled out of the tour and was replaced by Johne Murphy. Damien Varley was called up to the squad as cover for Jerry Flannery.

- Caps updated before tour.

Note: Flags indicate national union for the club/province as defined by World Rugby.

Player	Position	Date of birth (age)	Caps	Club/province
Seán Cronin	Hooker	6 May 1986 (aged 24)	2	(Ireland) Connacht
Jerry Flannery	Hooker	17 October 1978 (aged 31)	36	(Ireland) Munster
John Fogarty	Hooker	18 October 1977 (aged 32)	0	(Ireland) Leinster
Damien Varley	Hooker	29 October 1983 (aged 26)	0	(Ireland) Munster
Tony Buckley	Prop	8 August 1980 (aged 29)	17	(Ireland) Munster
Tom Court	Prop	6 November 1980 (aged 29)	7	(Ireland) Ulster
John Hayes	Prop	2 November 1973 (aged 36)	102	(Ireland) Munster
Cian Healy	Prop	7 October 1987 (aged 22)	7	(Ireland) Leinster
Marcus Horan	Prop	9 September 1977 (aged 32)	66	(Ireland) Munster
Donncha O'Callaghan	Lock	24 March 1979 (aged 31)	61	(Ireland) Munster
Ed O'Donoghue	Lock	24 June 1982 (aged 27)	0	(Ireland) Ulster
Mick O'Driscoll	Lock	8 October 1978 (aged 31)	17	(Ireland) Munster
Dan Tuohy	Lock	18 June 1985 (aged 24)	0	(Ireland) Ulster
Shane Jennings	Flanker	8 July 1981 (aged 28)	7	(Ireland) Leinster
John Muldoon	Flanker	30 November 1982 (aged 27)	2	(Ireland) Connacht
Niall Ronan	Flanker	14 September 1982 (aged 27)	2	(Ireland) Munster
David Wallace	Flanker	8 July 1976 (aged 33)	62	(Ireland) Munster
Jamie Heaslip	Number 8	15 December 1983 (aged 26)	26	(Ireland) Leinster
Chris Henry	Number 8	17 October 1984 (aged 25)	0	(Ireland) Ulster
Tomás O'Leary	Scrum-half	20 October 1983 (aged 26)	16	(Ireland) Munster
Eoin Reddan	Scrum-half	20 November 1980 (aged 29)	20	(Ireland) Leinster
Peter Stringer	Scrum-half	13 December 1977 (aged 32)	91	(Ireland) Munster
Ronan O'Gara	Fly-half	7 March 1977 (aged 33)	98	(Ireland) Munster
Johnny Sexton	Fly-half	11 July 1985 (aged 24)	6	(Ireland) Leinster
Gordon D'Arcy	Centre	10 February 1980 (aged 30)	48	(Ireland) Leinster
Gavin Duffy	Centre	18 September 1981 (aged 28)	10	(Ireland) Connacht
Brian O'Driscoll (c)	Centre	21 January 1979 (aged 31)	101	(Ireland) Leinster
Paddy Wallace	Centre	27 August 1979 (aged 30)	21	(Ireland) Ulster
Tommy Bowe	Wing	22 February 1984 (aged 26)	30	(Wales) Ospreys
Shane Horgan	Wing	18 July 1978 (aged 31)	65	(Ireland) Leinster
Johne Murphy	Wing	10 November 1984 (aged 25)	0	(Ireland) Munster
Andrew Trimble	Wing	20 October 1984 (aged 25)	27	(Ireland) Ulster
Rob Kearney	Fullback	26 March 1986 (aged 24)	23	(Ireland) Leinster
Geordan Murphy	Fullback	19 April 1978 (aged 32)	66	(England) Leicester

== Coaching and management ==
Position	Name
Head coach	Declan Kidney
Team Manager	Paul McNaughton

== Matches ==
12 June 2010

New Zealand	66–28	Ireland
Try: Smith (2) 10', 47'; Read 21'; Franks 27'; Cowan (2) 30', 33'; Whitelock (2) 50', 78'; Tialata 65'; Con: Carter (7/7); Weepu (2/2); Pen: Carter (1/1)	Report	Try: Dan Tuohy 36'; O'Driscoll 54'; Bowe 60'; D'Arcy 75'; Con: O'Gara (3/3); Sexton (1/1)

Yarrow Stadium, New Plymouth
Attendance: 25,000
Referee: Wayne Barnes (England)

18 June 2010

New Zealand Māori	31–28	Ireland XV
Try: Gear; Sweeney; Lowe; Con: McAlister (1/3); Ripia (1/1); Pen: McAlister (3/3); Ripia (1/1)	Report	Try: Wallace; Con: Sexton (1/1); Pen:Sexton (7/8)

Rotorua International Stadium, Rotorua
Attendance: 13,500
Referee: Mark Lawrence (South Africa)

26 June 2010

Australia	22–15	Ireland
Try: Burgess 17'; Cooper 39'; Pen: Quade Cooper (2) 12', 33'; Matt Giteau (2) 52', 61'	Report	Pen: Sexton (5) 2', 9', 22', 29', 35'

Suncorp Stadium, Brisbane
Attendance: 45,498
Referee: Bryce Lawrence (New Zealand)

== See also ==
- History of rugby union matches between Ireland and Australia
- History of rugby union matches between Ireland and New Zealand
