= 2012 Ireland rugby union tour of New Zealand =

- Coach: Declan Kidney
- Tour captain: Brian O'Driscoll
- Top test point scorer: Johnny Sexton (19)
- Top test try scorer(s): Fergus McFadden (1); Conor Murray (1)
Summary
P	W	D	L
Total
3	0	0	3
Test match
3	0	0	3
Opponent
P	W	D	L
New Zealand
3	0	0	3

Tour chronology
- ← Australia & New Zealand 2010 Canada & USA 2013 →

In June 2012, Ireland toured New Zealand playing three Tests against the All Blacks. The Irish tour was one in a series of tours by northern teams to be hosted by southern hemisphere nations. It was marketed as the 'Steinlager Series'.

In planning the series, it was anticipated that Ireland would also face provincial and Māori opposition, however, to allow Ireland to focus on the Tests, the IRFU decided that there would be no mid-week fixtures.

New Zealand won the series 3–0. In the third and final Test in Hamilton on 23 June, the All Blacks won 60–0, inflicting upon Ireland their largest-ever defeat.

== Test matches ==
=== First Test ===
9 June 2012
19:35 NZST (UTC+12)

New Zealand	42–10	Ireland
Try: Savea (3) 25' c, 37' c, 43' c Thomson 54' m C. Smith 77' c Con: Carter (4/5) 26', 38', 45, 78; Pen: Carter (3/3) 5', 14', 17'	Report	Try: McFadden 48' c Con: Sexton (1/1) 49'; Pen: Sexton (1/1) 7'

Eden Park, Auckland
Attendance: 47,300
Referee: Nigel Owens (Wales)

FB	15	Israel Dagg
RW	14	Zac Guildford	(substituted off) 52'
OC	13	Conrad Smith
IC	12	Sonny Bill Williams
LW	11	Julian Savea	(substituted off) 64'
FH	10	Dan Carter
SH	9	Aaron Smith	(substituted off) 56'
N8	8	Kieran Read
OF	7	Richie McCaw (c)
BF	6	Victor Vito	(substituted off) 46'
RL	5	Sam Whitelock
LL	4	Brodie Retallick	(substituted off) 52'
TP	3	Owen Franks	(substituted off) 61'
HK	2	Andrew Hore	(substituted off) 61'
LP	1	Tony Woodcock
Replacements:
HK	16	Hika Elliot	(substituted on) 61'
PR	17	Ben Franks	(substituted on) 61'
LK	18	Ali Williams	(substituted on) 52'
FL	19	Adam Thomson	(substituted on) 46'
SH	20	Piri Weepu	(substituted on) 56'
FH	21	Aaron Cruden	(substituted on) 64'
WG	22	Ben Smith	(substituted on) 52'
Coach:
(New Zealand) Steve Hansen

FB	15	Rob Kearney
RW	14	Fergus McFadden
OC	13	Brian O'Driscoll (c)
IC	12	Keith Earls	(substituted off) 72'
LW	11	Simon Zebo
FH	10	Johnny Sexton	(substituted off) 57'
SH	9	Conor Murray	(substituted off) 61'
N8	8	Jamie Heaslip
OF	7	Seán O'Brien
BF	6	Peter O'Mahony	(substituted off) 61'
RL	5	Donnacha Ryan
LL	4	Dan Tuohy	(substituted off) 61'
TP	3	Declan Fitzpatrick	(substituted off) 55'
HK	2	Rory Best
LP	1	Cian Healy	(substituted off) 71'
Replacements:
HK	16	Seán Cronin	(substituted on) 71'
PR	17	Ronan Loughney	(substituted on) 55'
LK	18	Donncha O'Callaghan	(substituted on) 61'
N8	19	Kevin McLaughlin	(substituted on) 61'
SH	20	Eoin Reddan	(substituted on) 61'
FH	21	Ronan O'Gara	(substituted on) 57'
OC	22	Darren Cave	(substituted on) 72'
Coach:
(Ireland) Declan Kidney

Touch judges:
(South Africa) Jaco Peyper
(Australia) James Leckie
Television match official:
(Australia) Matt Goddard

- Three players made their full international debut for New Zealand: Brodie Retallick, Julian Savea and Aaron Smith.
- Three players made their full international debut for Ireland: Simon Zebo, Declan Fitzpatrick and Ronan Loughney.

=== Second Test ===
16 June 2012
19:35 NZST (UTC+12)

New Zealand	22–19	Ireland
Try: A. Smith 42' c Con: Carter (1/1); Pen: Carter (4/5) 22', 30', 35', 64'; Drop: Carter (1/1) 81'	Report	Try: Murray 11' c Con: Sexton (1/1); Pen: Sexton (4/5) 20', 47', 65', 69'

Rugby League Park, Christchurch
Attendance: 21,000
Referee: Nigel Owens (Wales)

FB	15	Israel Dagg	(yellow card) 71' to 80'
RW	14	Zac Guildford
OC	13	Conrad Smith
IC	12	Sonny Bill Williams
LW	11	Julian Savea		(substituted off) 73'
FH	10	Dan Carter
SH	9	Aaron Smith		(substituted off) 64'
N8	8	Kieran Read		(substituted off) 40'
OF	7	Richie McCaw (c)
BF	6	Adam Thomson		(substituted off) 65'	(substituted on) 69'
RL	5	Sam Whitelock
LL	4	Brodie Retallick		(substituted off) 64'	(substituted on) 65'	(substituted off) 69'
TP	3	Owen Franks		(substituted off) 57'
HK	2	Andrew Hore
LP	1	Tony Woodcock
Replacements:
HK	16	Hika Elliot
PR	17	Ben Franks		(substituted on) 57'
LK	18	Ali Williams		(substituted on) 64'
LK	19	Sam Cane		(substituted on) 40'
SH	20	Piri Weepu		(substituted on) 64'
FH	21	Aaron Cruden
WG	22	Ben Smith		(substituted on) 73'
Coach:
(New Zealand) Steve Hansen

FB	15	Rob Kearney
RW	14	Fergus McFadden
OC	13	Brian O'Driscoll (c)
IC	12	Gordon D'Arcy	(substituted off) 51'
LW	11	Andrew Trimble
FH	10	Johnny Sexton
SH	9	Conor Murray	(substituted off) 64'
N8	8	Jamie Heaslip
OF	7	Seán O'Brien
BF	6	Kevin McLaughlin	(substituted off) 61'
RL	5	Donnacha Ryan
LL	4	Dan Tuohy	(substituted off) 58'
TP	3	Mike Ross
HK	2	Rory Best
LP	1	Cian Healy
Replacements:
HK	16	Seán Cronin
PR	17	Declan Fitzpatrick
LK	18	Donncha O'Callaghan	(substituted on) 58'
N8	19	Peter O'Mahony	(substituted on) 61'
SH	20	Eoin Reddan	(substituted on) 64'
FH	21	Ronan O'Gara	(substituted on) 51'
WG	22	Simon Zebo
Coach:
(Ireland) Declan Kidney

Touch judges:
(France) Romain Poite
(France) Pascal Gauzere
Television match official:
(Australia) Matt Goddard

- This was Ireland's first Test match in Christchurch.
- Sam Cane made his international debut for New Zealand.

=== Third Test ===
23 June 2012
19:35 NZST (UTC+12)

New Zealand	60–0	Ireland
Try: Cane (2) 6' c, 43' c Williams (2) 11' c, 18' c B. Smith 22' m Gear 49' m Messam 57' m Dagg 62' c Thomson 72' c Con: Cruden (2/2) 7', 12'; Dagg (1/2) 19'; Barrett (3/5) 44', 63', 73'; Pen: Cruden (0/1); Barrett (1/1) 40'	Report

Waikato Stadium, Hamilton
Attendance: 25,100
Referee: Romain Poite (France)

FB	15	Israel Dagg
RW	14	Ben Smith
OC	13	Conrad Smith	(substituted off) 60'
IC	12	Sonny Bill Williams
LW	11	Hosea Gear
FH	10	Aaron Cruden	(substituted off) 23'
SH	9	Aaron Smith	(substituted off) 60'
N8	8	Richie McCaw (c)
OF	7	Sam Cane	(substituted off) 69'
BF	6	Liam Messam
RL	5	Sam Whitelock	(substituted off) 57'
LL	4	Luke Romano
TP	3	Owen Franks
HK	2	Andrew Hore	(substituted off) 43'
LP	1	Tony Woodcock	(substituted off) 76'
Replacements:
HK	16	Keven Mealamu	(substituted on) 43'
PR	17	Ben Franks	(substituted on) 76'
LK	18	Brodie Retallick	(substituted on) 57'
FL	19	Adam Thomson	(substituted on) 69'
SH	20	Piri Weepu	(substituted on) 60'
FH	21	Beauden Barrett	(substituted on) 23'
IC	22	Tamati Ellison	(substituted on) 60'
Coach:
(New Zealand) Steve Hansen

FB	15	Rob Kearney	(yellow card) 40' to 50'
RW	14	Fergus McFadden
OC	13	Brian O'Driscoll (c)
IC	12	Paddy Wallace		(substituted off) 54'
LW	11	Keith Earls		(substituted off) 50'	(substituted on) 54'	(substituted off) 73'
FH	10	Johnny Sexton
SH	9	Conor Murray		(substituted off) 59'
N8	8	Peter O'Mahony
OF	7	Seán O'Brien
BF	6	Kevin McLaughlin		(substituted off) 54'
RL	5	Donnacha Ryan
LL	4	Dan Tuohy		(substituted off) 55'
TP	3	Mike Ross		(substituted off) 59'
HK	2	Rory Best		(substituted off) 68'
LP	1	Cian Healy
Replacements:
HK	16	Seán Cronin		(substituted on) 68'
PR	17	Declan Fitzpatrick		(substituted on) 59'
LK	18	Donncha O'Callaghan		(substituted on) 55'
FL	19	Chris Henry		(substituted on) 54'
SH	20	Eoin Reddan		(substituted on) 59'
FH	21	Ronan O'Gara		(substituted on) 54'
WG	22	Andrew Trimble		(substituted on) 50'	(substituted off) 54'	(substituted on) 73'
Coach:
(Ireland) Declan Kidney

Touch judges:
(France) Pascal Gauzere
(Australia) James Leckie
Television match official:
(Australia) Matt Goddard

- New Zealand's 60–0 victory was their largest-ever winning margin against Ireland.
- This remains Ireland's largest ever defeat.
- Beauden Barrett made his international debut for New Zealand.

== Touring squad ==
Ireland's 30-man squad for the three-Test tour of New Zealand. Ireland's initial squad for the clash against the Barbarians was announced on 15 May, no Leinster players were selected due to the RaboDirect PRO12 final. Ireland's 29-man squad for the three-Test tour of New Zealand was named on 21 May. Four additional players were added to the squad. Tommy Bowe was ruled out of the tour in early April after undergoing surgery to remove a haematoma. Stephen Ferris was ruled out of the tour due to a calf injury, he was replaced by McLaughlin. Isaac Boss was ruled out of the tour owing to an ongoing thigh problem, he was replaced by Marshall. Paul O'Connell was ruled out of the tour after failing to recover sufficiently from a knee injury, he was replaced by McCarthy. The additional players were Wilkinson and Henry. Loughney was also included to provide cover for Ross.

Head coach: Declan Kidney

- Caps updated before tour. Ages are as of the first Test on 9 June.

Note: Flags indicate national union for the club/province as defined by World Rugby.

Player	Position	Date of birth (age)	Caps	Club/province
Rory Best	Hooker	15 August 1982 (aged 29)	59	Ulster
Seán Cronin	Hooker	6 May 1986 (aged 26)	19	Leinster
Mike Sherry	Hooker	18 June 1988 (aged 23)	0	Munster
Declan Fitzpatrick	Prop	12 July 1983 (aged 28)	0	Ulster
Cian Healy	Prop	7 October 1987 (aged 24)	30	Leinster
Ronan Loughney	Prop	1 November 1984 (aged 27)	0	Connacht
Mike Ross	Prop	21 December 1979 (aged 32)	20	Leinster
Brett Wilkinson	Prop	29 November 1983 (aged 28)	0	Connacht
Mike McCarthy	Lock	27 November 1981 (aged 30)	4	Connacht
Donncha O'Callaghan	Lock	24 March 1979 (aged 33)	85	Munster
Donnacha Ryan	Lock	11 December 1983 (aged 28)	18	Munster
Dan Tuohy	Lock	18 June 1985 (aged 26)	2	Ulster
Chris Henry	Flanker	17 October 1984 (aged 27)	1	Ulster
Kevin McLaughlin	Flanker	20 September 1984 (aged 27)	2	Leinster
Seán O'Brien	Flanker	14 February 1987 (aged 25)	19	Leinster
Jamie Heaslip	Number 8	15 December 1983 (aged 28)	48	Leinster
Peter O'Mahony	Number 8	17 September 1989 (aged 22)	4	Munster
Paul Marshall	Scrum-half	26 July 1985 (aged 26)	0	Ulster
Conor Murray	Scrum-half	20 April 1989 (aged 23)	9	Munster
Eoin Reddan	Scrum-half	20 November 1980 (aged 31)	42	Leinster
Ronan O'Gara	Fly-half	7 March 1977 (aged 35)	121	Munster
Johnny Sexton	Fly-half	11 July 1985 (aged 26)	29	Leinster
Darren Cave	Centre	5 April 1987 (aged 25)	2	Ulster
Gordon D'Arcy	Centre	10 February 1980 (aged 32)	68	Leinster
Keith Earls	Centre	2 October 1987 (aged 24)	30	Munster
Brian O'Driscoll	Centre	21 January 1979 (aged 33)	117	Leinster
Fergus McFadden	Wing	17 June 1986 (aged 25)	11	Leinster
Andrew Trimble	Wing	20 October 1984 (aged 27)	46	Ulster
Simon Zebo	Wing	16 March 1990 (aged 22)	0	Munster
Rob Kearney	Fullback	26 March 1986 (aged 26)	38	Leinster

=== Coaching and management team ===
Position	Name
Head coach	Declan Kidney
Team Manager	Michael Kearney

== Home squad ==
New Zealand 30-man squad named for the three-Test series against Ireland. Hika Elliot will train with the squad to provide cover for Keven Mealamu.

Head coach: Steve Hansen

- Caps updated before tour. Ages are as of the first Test on 9 June.

Note: Flags indicate national union for the club/province as defined by World Rugby.

Player	Position	Date of birth (age)	Caps	Club/province
Hika Elliot	Hooker	22 January 1986 (aged 26)	3	Chiefs
Andrew Hore	Hooker	13 September 1978 (aged 33)	62	Highlanders
Keven Mealamu	Hooker	20 March 1979 (aged 33)	92	Blues
Wyatt Crockett	Prop	24 January 1983 (aged 29)	6	Crusaders
Ben Franks	Prop	27 March 1984 (aged 28)	15	Crusaders
Owen Franks	Prop	23 December 1987 (aged 24)	31	Crusaders
Ben Tameifuna	Prop	30 August 1991 (aged 20)	0	Chiefs
Tony Woodcock	Prop	27 January 1981 (aged 31)	83	Blues
Brodie Retallick	Lock	31 May 1991 (aged 21)	0	Chiefs
Luke Romano	Lock	16 February 1986 (aged 26)	0	Crusaders
Sam Whitelock	Lock	12 October 1988 (aged 23)	25	Crusaders
Ali Williams	Lock	30 April 1981 (aged 30)	73	Blues
Sam Cane	Flanker	13 January 1992 (aged 20)	0	Chiefs
Richie McCaw (c)	Flanker	31 December 1980 (aged 31)	103	Crusaders
Adam Thomson	Flanker	13 March 1982 (aged 30)	24	Highlanders
Kieran Read	Number 8	26 October 1985 (aged 26)	36	Crusaders
Victor Vito	Number 8	27 March 1987 (aged 25)	13	Hurricanes
Aaron Smith	Scrum-half	21 November 1988 (aged 23)	0	Highlanders
Piri Weepu	Scrum-half	7 September 1983 (aged 28)	56	Blues
Beauden Barrett	Fly-half	27 May 1991 (aged 21)	0	Hurricanes
Dan Carter(vc)	Fly-half	5 March 1982 (aged 30)	85	Crusaders
Aaron Cruden	Fly-half	8 January 1989 (aged 23)	9	Chiefs
Tamati Ellison	Centre	1 April 1983 (aged 29)	1	Highlanders
Ma'a Nonu	Centre	21 May 1982 (aged 30)	66	Blues
Conrad Smith	Centre	12 October 1981 (aged 30)	55	Hurricanes
Sonny Bill Williams	Centre	3 August 1985 (aged 26)	14	Chiefs
Hosea Gear	Wing	16 March 1984 (aged 28)	8	Highlanders
Zac Guildford	Wing	2 August 1989 (aged 22)	8	Crusaders
Julian Savea	Wing	7 August 1990 (aged 21)	0	Hurricanes
Israel Dagg	Fullback	6 June 1988 (aged 24)	12	Crusaders
Ben Smith	Fullback	1 June 1986 (aged 26)	2	Highlanders

=== Coaching and management team ===
Position	Name
Head coach	Steve Hansen
Team Manager	Darren Shand

== See also ==
- 2012 mid-year rugby test series
- 2012 Rugby Championship
- History of rugby union matches between Ireland and New Zealand
- Ireland national rugby union team
- New Zealand national rugby union team
