= History of rugby union matches between Ireland and New Zealand =

New Zealand (the All Blacks) first played against Ireland in 1905, during the 1905–1906 All Blacks tour of Europe and North America, beating Ireland 15–0 at Lansdowne Road, Dublin. The two teams have played 40 test matches, with New Zealand winning 34, Ireland winning 5, and 1 match drawn.

During the 2012 Irish Tour of New Zealand, New Zealand won all three tests, scoring 124 points to Ireland's 29. This tour also saw New Zealand post the biggest winning margin against Ireland in their history, with a score of 60–0 on 23 June 2012. On 24 November 2013, New Zealand were trailing 17–22 against Ireland in the final minute of the match, and on the verge of their first ever loss to Ireland, the Irish gave up a penalty with under 30 seconds remaining, which ultimately led to New Zealand working their way up the field, ending in a try to tie the scoring. The try was converted after the second attempt, giving New Zealand a 24–22 victory and a complete perfect 2013 season.

Despite New Zealand's dominance until 2016, the ten matches between 2016 and 2024 were shared five each in tightly contested matches between teams at the top of the world rankings. Ireland ended a 111–year wait for a victory at Soldier Field in Chicago with a 40–29 win on 5 November 2016. On 17 November 2018, Ireland won 16–9 at the Aviva Stadium, Dublin, their first home win against the New Zealand. In the 2022 Irish Tour of New Zealand, Ireland scored their first victory against the All Blacks in New Zealand on 9 July 2022. The following week Ireland became just the fifth touring side to achieve a series win in New Zealand, winning 32–22 in Wellington for a 2–1 series victory, and consecutive victories against New Zealand for the first time. The two teams have met each other in the knockout stages of the Rugby World Cup twice with New Zealand winning on both occasions, 46–14 in 2019 and 28–24 in 2023. The most recent test match between the two teams was on 18 July 2026, which saw the All Blacks beat Ireland 40–21 at Eden Park.

== Summary ==
=== Overall ===
Details	Played	Won by Ireland	Won by New Zealand	Drawn	Ireland points	New Zealand points
In Ireland	19	2	16	1	206	421
In New Zealand	16	2	14	0	247	537
Neutral venue	5	1	4	0	110	172
Overall	40	5	34	1	563	1,130

=== Records ===
Note: Date shown in brackets indicates when the record was or last set.

Record	Ireland	New Zealand
Longest winning streak	2 (9 July 2022 – 16 July 2022)	22 (23 November 1974 – 5 November 2016)
Largest points for
Home	29 (17 November 2001; 13 November 2021)	66 (12 June 2010)
Away	32 (16 July 2022)	63 (15 November 1997)
Neutral	40 (5 November 2016)	46 (19 October 2019)
Largest winning margin
Home	9 (13 November 2021)	60 (23 June 2012)
Away	11 (9 July 2022)	48 (15 November 1997)
Neutral	11 (5 November 2016)	32 (19 October 2019)

=== Attendance ===
Up to date as of 6 November 2026.

Total attendance	1,636,288
Average attendance	40,907
Highest attendance	78,845; Ireland 24–28 New Zealand; 14 Oct 2023

== Results ==
No.	Date	Venue	Score	Winner	Competition	Attendance	Ref.
1	25 November 1905	Lansdowne Road, Dublin	0–15	New Zealand	The Original All Blacks	12,000	
2	1 November 1924	Lansdowne Road, Dublin	0–6	New Zealand	1924–25 New Zealand rugby union tour of Britain, Ireland and France	25,000	
3	7 December 1935	Lansdowne Road, Dublin	9–17	New Zealand	1935–36 New Zealand rugby union tour of Britain, Ireland and Canada	30,000	
4	9 January 1954	Lansdowne Road, Dublin	3–14	New Zealand	1953–54 New Zealand rugby union tour of Britain, Ireland, France and North America	45,000	
5	7 December 1963	Lansdowne Road, Dublin	5–6	New Zealand	1963–64 New Zealand rugby union tour of Britain, Ireland, France and North America	32,000	
6	20 January 1973	Lansdowne Road, Dublin	10–10	draw	1972–73 New Zealand rugby union tour of Britain, Ireland, France and North America	50,000	
7	23 November 1974	Lansdowne Road, Dublin	6–15	New Zealand	1974 New Zealand rugby union tour of Ireland, Wales and England	35,000	
8	5 June 1976	Athletic Park, Wellington	11–3	New Zealand	1976 Ireland rugby union tour of New Zealand and Fiji	37,000	
9	4 November 1978	Lansdowne Road, Dublin	6–10	New Zealand	1978 New Zealand rugby union tour of Britain and Ireland	50,000	
10	18 November 1989	Lansdowne Road, Dublin	6–23	New Zealand	1989 New Zealand rugby union tour of Canada and the British Isles	55,000	
11	30 May 1992	Carisbrook, Dunedin	24–21	New Zealand	1992 Ireland rugby union tour of New Zealand	28,000	
12	6 June 1992	Athletic Park, Wellington	59–6	New Zealand	1992 Ireland rugby union tour of New Zealand	25,000	
13	27 May 1995	Ellis Park Stadium, Johannesburg (South Africa)	19–43	New Zealand	1995 Rugby World Cup	38,000	
14	15 November 1997	Lansdowne Road, Dublin	15–63	New Zealand	1997 New Zealand rugby union tour of Britain and Ireland	52,000	
15	17 November 2001	Lansdowne Road, Dublin	29–40	New Zealand	2001 New Zealand rugby union tour	49,000	
16	15 June 2002	Carisbrook, Dunedin	15–6	New Zealand	2002 Ireland rugby union tour of New Zealand	30,200	
17	22 June 2002	Eden Park, Auckland	40–8	New Zealand	2002 Ireland rugby union tour of New Zealand	45,000	
18	12 November 2005	Lansdowne Road, Dublin	7–45	New Zealand	2005 New Zealand rugby union tour of Britain and Ireland	42,000	
19	10 June 2006	Waikato Stadium, Hamilton	34–23	New Zealand	2006 Ireland rugby union tour of New Zealand and Australia	29,850	
20	17 June 2006	Eden Park, Auckland	27–17	New Zealand	2006 Ireland rugby union tour of New Zealand and Australia	45,000	
21	7 June 2008	Wellington Regional Stadium, Wellington	21–11	New Zealand	2008 Ireland rugby union tour of New Zealand and Australia	32,127	
22	15 November 2008	Croke Park, Dublin	3–22	New Zealand	2008 end of year rugby union tests	77,500	
23	12 June 2010	Yarrow Stadium, New Plymouth	66–28	New Zealand	2010 Ireland tour of Australia and New Zealand	25,064	
24	20 November 2010	Aviva Stadium, Dublin	18–38	New Zealand	2010 end of year rugby union tests	49,302	
25	9 June 2012	Eden Park, Auckland	42–10	New Zealand	2012 Ireland rugby union tour of New Zealand	43,300	
26	16 June 2012	Rugby League Park, Christchurch	22–19	New Zealand	2012 Ireland rugby union tour of New Zealand	20,666	
27	23 June 2012	Waikato Stadium, Hamilton	60–0	New Zealand	2012 Ireland rugby union tour of New Zealand	25,109	
28	24 November 2013	Aviva Stadium, Dublin	22–24	New Zealand	2013 Autumn International	51,000	
29	5 November 2016	Soldier Field, Chicago (United States)	40–29	Ireland	2016 Autumn International	62,300	
30	19 November 2016	Aviva Stadium, Dublin	9–21	New Zealand	2016 Autumn International	51,700	
31	17 November 2018	Aviva Stadium, Dublin	16–9	Ireland	2018 end-of-year rugby union internationals	51,700	
32	19 October 2019	Tokyo Stadium, Chōfu (Japan)	46–14	New Zealand	2019 Rugby World Cup	46,686	
33	13 November 2021	Aviva Stadium, Dublin	29–20	Ireland	2021 end-of-year rugby union internationals	51,700	
34	2 July 2022	Eden Park, Auckland	42–19	New Zealand	2022 Ireland rugby union tour of New Zealand	48,195	
35	9 July 2022	Forsyth Barr Stadium, Dunedin	12–23	Ireland	2022 Ireland rugby union tour of New Zealand	28,191	
36	16 July 2022	Wellington Regional Stadium, Wellington	22–32	Ireland	2022 Ireland rugby union tour of New Zealand	38,000	
37	14 October 2023	Stade de France, Saint-Denis (France)	24–28	New Zealand	2023 Rugby World Cup	78,845	
38	8 November 2024	Aviva Stadium, Dublin	13–23	New Zealand	2024 end-of-year rugby union internationals	51,700	
39	1 November 2025	Soldier Field, Chicago (United States)	13–26	New Zealand	2025 end-of-year rugby union internationals	61,841	
40	18 July 2026	Eden Park, Auckland	40–21	New Zealand	2026 Nations Championship	48,153	

== List of series ==
Played	Won by Ireland	Won by New Zealand	Drawn
6	1	4	1

Year	New Zealand	Ireland	Series winner
1992	2	0	New Zealand
2002	2	0	New Zealand
2006	2	0	New Zealand
2012	3	0	New Zealand
2016	1	1	draw
2022	1	2	Ireland

== See also ==
- History of rugby union matches between Munster and New Zealand
- The Original All Blacks
- The Invincibles (rugby union)
