= 2000–01 European Challenge Cup =

Tournament details
- Countries: England; France; Ireland; Italy; Wales
- Tournament format(s): Round-robin and Knockout
- Date: 6 October 1999 - 20 May 2001

Tournament statistics
- Top point scorer(s): Barry Everitt (London Irish) (119 points)
- Top try scorer(s): Pépito Elhorga (Agen) (8 tries)

Final
- Champions: (England) NEC Harlequins (1st title)
- Runners-up: (France) Narbonne

The 2000–01 European Challenge Cup was the fifth year of the European Challenge Cup, the second tier rugby union cup competition below the Heineken Cup. The tournament was held between October 2000 and May 2001.

== Pool stage ==
=== Pool 1 ===
Team	P	W	D	L	Tries for	Tries against	Try diff	Points for	Points against	Points diff	Pts
(England) Newcastle Falcons	6	5	0	1	27	10	17	234	99	135	10
(Italy) Benetton Treviso	6	5	0	1	17	11	6	157	97	60	10
(France) Bordeaux-Begles	6	2	0	4	17	14	3	136	152	−16	4
(Wales) Cross Keys	6	0	0	6	7	33	−26	60	239	−179	0

=== Pool 2 ===
Team	P	W	D	L	Tries for	Tries against	Try diff	Points for	Points against	Points diff	Pts
(France) Béziers	6	5	0	1	14	10	4	151	112	39	10
(France) Montferrand	6	4	0	2	23	9	14	201	107	94	8
(Wales) Neath	6	2	0	4	16	23	−7	151	192	−41	4
(Ireland) Connacht	6	1	0	5	4	15	−11	60	152	−92	2

=== Pool 3 ===
Team	P	W	D	L	Tries for	Tries against	Try diff	Points for	Points against	Points diff	Pts
(France) Perpignan	6	4	0	2	20	9	11	187	105	82	8
(England) Rotherham Titans	6	4	0	2	13	19	−6	122	136	−14	8
(Wales) Bridgend RFC	6	2	0	4	15	16	−1	144	166	−22	4
(France) Grenoble	6	2	0	4	12	16	−4	120	166	−46	4

=== Pool 4 ===
Team	P	W	D	L	Tries for	Tries against	Try diff	Points for	Points against	Points diff	Pts
(France) Agen	6	5	0	1	37	5	32	259	91	168	10
(England) Sale Sharks	6	4	0	2	16	18	−2	178	155	23	8
(France) Auch	6	2	1	3	16	21	−5	134	185	−51	5
(Wales) Caerphilly	6	0	1	5	11	36	−25	128	268	−140	1

=== Pool 5 ===
Team	P	W	D	L	Tries for	Tries against	Try diff	Points for	Points against	Points diff	Pts
(England) NEC Harlequins	6	5	0	1	22	8	14	188	80	108	10
(France) Dax	6	5	0	1	17	10	7	152	103	49	10
(Wales) Ebbw Vale	6	1	0	5	13	18	−5	120	151	−31	2
(France) Périgueux	6	1	0	5	9	25	−16	94	220	−126	2

=== Pool 6 ===
Team	P	W	D	L	Tries for	Tries against	Try diff	Points for	Points against	Points diff	Pts
(England) London Irish	6	5	0	1	25	13	12	254	106	148	10
(France) Brive	6	5	0	1	23	11	12	184	143	41	10
(France) Aurillac	6	2	0	4	20	17	3	155	179	−24	4
(Italy) Piacenza	6	0	0	6	10	37	−27	90	255	−165	0

=== Pool 7 ===
Team	P	W	D	L	Tries for	Tries against	Try diff	Points for	Points against	Points diff	Pts
(France) Mont de Marsan	6	5	0	1	22	8	14	177	113	64	10
(France) La Rochelle	6	3	1	2	21	11	10	167	113	54	7
(England) Bristol Shoguns	6	3	1	2	17	16	1	199	147	52	7
(Italy) Rugby Parma	6	0	0	6	12	37	−25	92	262	−170	0

=== Pool 8 ===
Team	P	W	D	L	Tries for	Tries against	Try diff	Points for	Points against	Points diff	Pts
(France) Narbonne	4	3	1	0	13	9	4	124	76	48	7
(France) Bourgoin	4	2	1	1	13	6	7	104	83	21	5
(Italy) Rugby Viadana	4	0	0	4	8	19	−11	78	147	−69	0

== Knockout stage ==
=== Quarter-finals ===
27 January 2001

Narbonne (France)	34–24	(France) Perpignan

Parc des Sports et de l'Amitie

27 January 2001

Agen (France)	31–0	(France) Béziers

Stade Armandie

28 January 2001

London Irish (England)	13–20	(England) Harlequins

Parc Municipal des Sports

28 January 2001

Newcastle Falcons (England)	61–23	(France) Mont-de-Marsan

Kingston Park
Attendance: 2,500

=== Semi-finals ===
21 April 2001

Narbonne (France)	22–15	(France) Agen

Stade Ernest-Wallon
Attendance: 12,000

22 April 2001

Harlequins (England)	17–12	(England) Newcastle Falcons

Headingley Stadium
Attendance: 6,000

=== Final ===
20 May 2001

Harlequins (England)	42–33	(France) Narbonne

Madejski Stadium
Attendance: 11,211

Harlequins: J. Williams, Gollings, Greenwood, Greenstock, O'Leary, Burke, M. Powell, Leonard, Wood, Dawson, Morgan, White-Cooper, Sanderson, Wilson, Winters.

Replacements: Friday, Chalmers, Jennings, Starr, Fuga, Codling, Jenkins.

Narbonne: Corletto, Joubert, Douy, A. Stoica, Rouch, Quesada, Sudre, Martinez, Ledesma, Pucciarello, Gaston, Merle, Furet, Raynaud, Reid.

Replacements: Racine, Poux, Plateret, Mathieu, Azema, Rosalen, Buada.

Referee: Nigel Whitehouse (Wales)

== See also ==
- European Challenge Cup
- 2000-01 Heineken Cup
