= Colm Rigney =

- Born: Colm Rigney; 25 April 1978 Portlaoise
- Height: 6 ft 4 in (193 cm)
- Weight: 113 kg (249 lb; 17 st 11 lb)
- School: CBS Portlaoise

Rugby union career
- Position: Lock
Amateur team(s)
Years	Team	Apps	(Points)
2001–2003	Portlaoise RFC	9	(0)
Senior career
Years	Team	Apps	(Points)
2003–2005	Leeds Carnegie	45	(20)
Provincial / State sides
Years	Team	Apps	(Points)
2005–2009	Connacht	116	(50)

Colm Rigney (born 25 April 1978) is an Irish rugby union player and coach.
