= Ultan O'Callaghan =

- Born: 24 March 1971 (age 55) Cork, Ireland
- Height: 1.91 m (6 ft 3 in)
- Weight: 114 kg (18.0 st; 251 lb)
- Notable relative: Donncha O'Callaghan (brother)

Rugby union career
- Position: Lock
Amateur team(s)
Years	Team	Apps	(Points)
- Cork Constitution
Senior career
Years	Team	Apps	(Points)
1996–1998	Munster	5	(0)
1999	Connacht	4	(10)

Ultan O'Callaghan (born 24 March 1971) is an Irish former rugby union player.

== Career ==
Born in Cork, O'Callaghan represented local club Cork Constitution throughout the 1990s in the All-Ireland League. He missed Con's victorious final against Garryowen in 1999 due to injury, and was captain of the team that ended up losing to Dungannon during the 2000–01 season, though O'Callaghan himself again missed the final due to injury. He also won representation with the Ireland under-21 team and five caps for Munster between 1996 and 1998, before playing for Connacht in 1999.

After the end of his brief professional playing career, O'Callaghan returned to Munster as a development officer in 2000, going on to become coach development manager, before being domestic rugby manager in 2008.
