= John McWeeney =

Irish former professional rugby union player born 1976

- Full name: John Paul James McWeeney
- Born: 26 May 1976 (age 50) Dublin, Ireland
- Height: 6 ft 3 in (191 cm)
- Weight: 224 lb (102 kg)

Rugby union career
- Position: Wing
International career
Years	Team	Apps	(Points)
1997	Ireland	1	(0)

John Paul James McWeeney (born 26 May 1976) is an Irish former professional rugby union player who competed for Leinster from 1997 to 2005 and was capped once for Ireland.

McWeeney, born in Dublin, attended St Mary's College. He was a winger and had a quick rise up the ranks of Irish rugby in 1997, going from a St Mary's College RFC rookie to earning an international call-up, with six games for Leinster in between. Debuting on the left wing for Ireland against the 1997 All Blacks at Lansdowne Road, the 21-year old played opposite Jeff Wilson and was substituted off during the second half, as the visitors won by 48 points. He continued to play for Leinster until 2005, retiring to begin a career in financial services.

== See also ==
- List of Ireland national rugby union players
