= Mel Deane =

Irish rugby union player

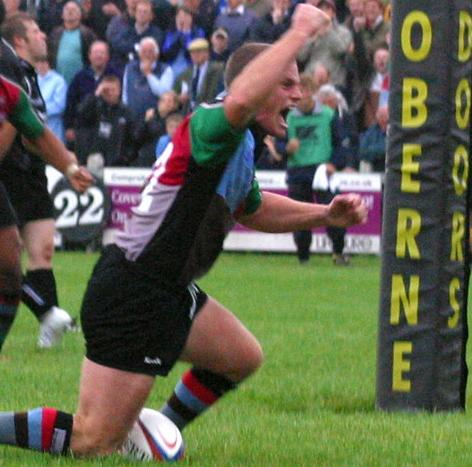
Deane celebrating with Harlequins

Mel Deane (born 16 January 1975) is a former rugby union footballer who played centre for Connacht, Harlequins and Sale Sharks and Richmond.

Mel Deane has represented Ireland A and was also part of the Ireland squad that toured New Zealand in 2002, but was ultimately never capped at senior level.

Mel retired after the 2007/2008 season finishing his career at Connacht.

Mel is now a professional fitness consultant in South West London.
