= Keith Gleeson =

Irish rugby union player

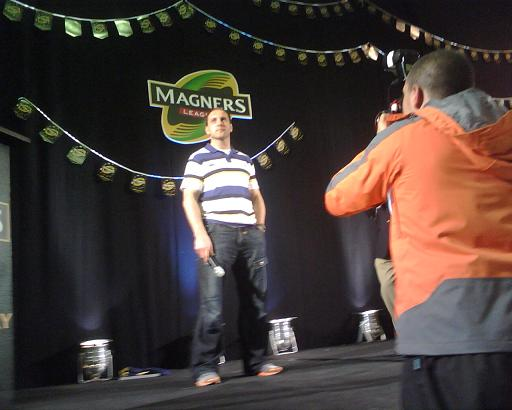
- Born: Keith Gleeson; 17 June 1976 (age 50) Dublin, Ireland
- Height: 1.86 m (6 ft 1 in)
- Weight: 98 kg (15 st 6 lb; 216 lb)
- School: St Aloysius' College

Rugby union career
- Position: Flanker
Amateur team(s)
Years	Team	Apps	(Points)
- Northern Suburbs
–	St Mary's College		
Senior career
Years	Team	Apps	(Points)
2001–2008	Leinster	120	(70)
- Correct as of 3 May 2008
Super Rugby
Years	Team	Apps	(Points)
1997–2001	Waratahs		
International career
Years	Team	Apps	(Points)
1995	Australia U19		
1996–1997	Australia U21		
2001–2007	Ireland A	6	(5)
2002–2007	Ireland	27	(20)

Keith Gleeson (born 21 June 1976) is a retired Irish Australian rugby union football player.

== Early life ==
Gleeson was born in Dublin, Ireland, before moving to Australia with his family as a child. Raised in Sydney, Australia, Gleeson attended Catholic Jesuit school St Aloysius' College representing the schools 1st XV rugby union team over 2 years and as captain in the latter and playing for the CAS 1st XV and the New South Wales 2nd XV. He went on to represent Australia at u/19 and u/21 (Captain).

== Professional rugby career ==
Gleeson has enjoyed a distinct career, representing Northern Suburbs in the Sydney competition, the NSW Waratahs in the Super 12, Leinster in Ireland and finally most notably Ireland. His preferred position is as an openside flanker. Perhaps the highlight of his career was representing Ireland in the 2003 Rugby World Cup. He stands 1.86 m and his playing weight is 98 kg. On numerous occasions George Hook has stated that Gleeson should start for Ireland as he feels he is their best openside flanker. Gleeson retired from professional rugby at the end of the 07/08 season with a Magners League winners medal.
