= Shane Horgan =

Irish rugby union player

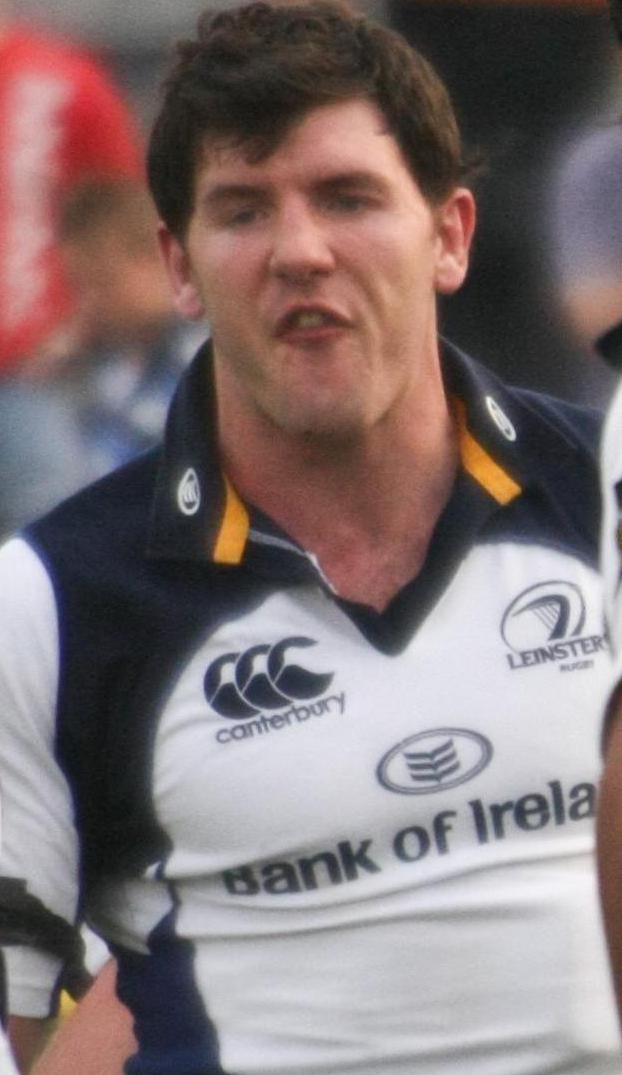
- Born: Shane Patrick Horgan; 18 July 1978 (age 48) Bellewstown, County Meath, Ireland
- Height: 6 ft 4 in (1.93 m)
- Weight: 16 st 5 lb (229 lb; 104 kg)
- School: St Mary's Diocesan
- Notable relative: Sharon Horgan (sister)

Rugby union career
- Position(s): Wing, centre
Senior career
Years	Team	Apps	(Points)
- Boyne RFC
–	Lansdowne		
Provincial / State sides
Years	Team	Apps	(Points)
1998–2011	Leinster	203	(348)
International career
Years	Team	Apps	(Points)
1996–1998	Ireland U18 Clubs	5	
1998–2000	IRL U-21	7	
1999–2009	Ireland A	7	(5)
2000–2009	Ireland	65	(105)
2005	British & Irish Lions	3	(0)
- Correct as of 26 June 2010

Shane Patrick Horgan (born 18 July 1978) is an Irish former rugby union player who played wing or centre for Leinster and Ireland.

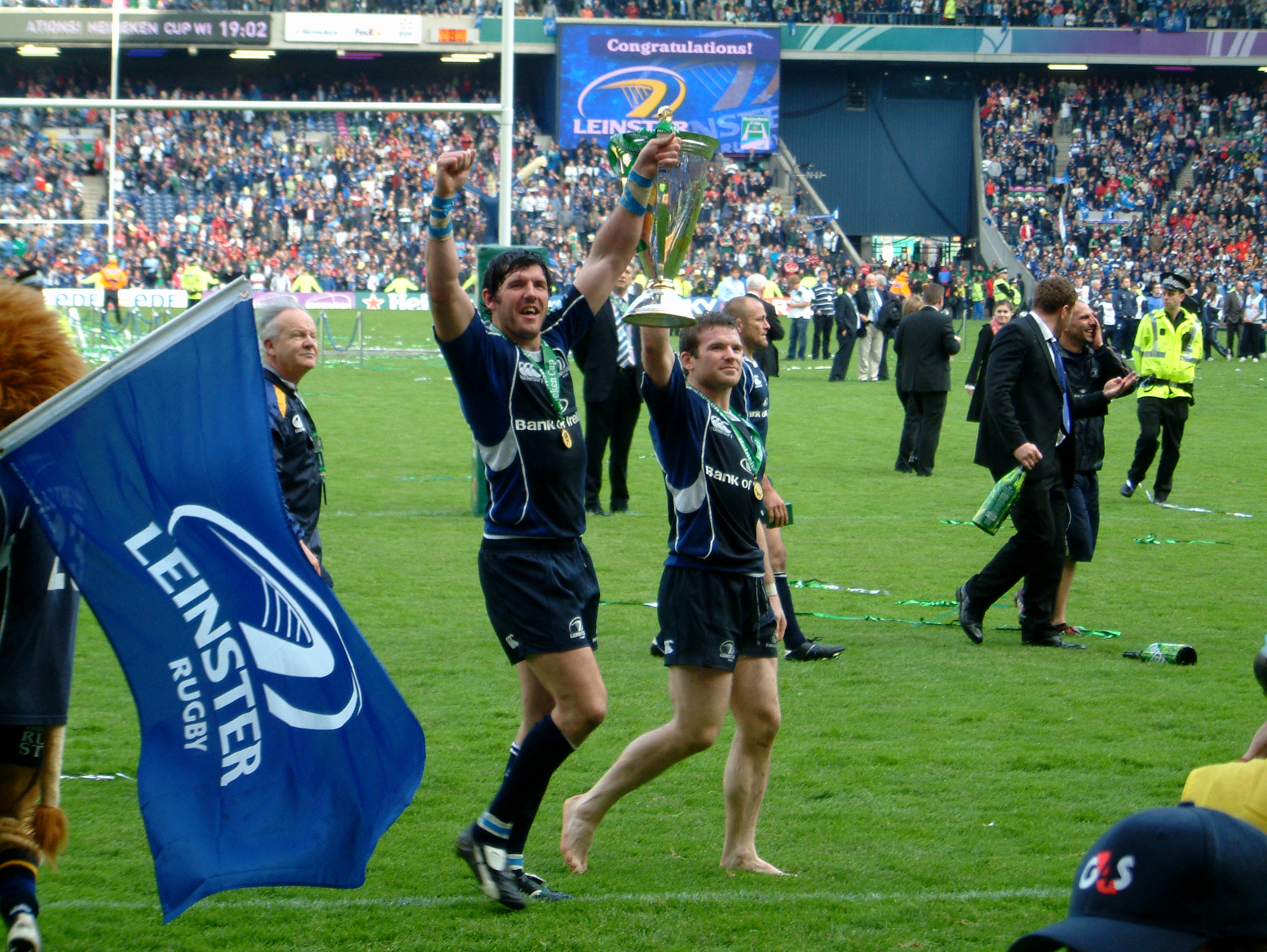
Horgan and Gordon D'Arcy parading the Heineken Cup trophy in 2009

== Early life ==
Horgan was born on 18 July 1978 in Bellewstown, County Meath, to an Irish mother, Ursula (née Campbell) from County Kildare and a New Zealand father, John. His maternal grandparents were from Midfield, County Mayo. He has three older sisters, Maria, Sharon, and Lorraine, and one younger brother, Mark.

In his youth, he played for Boyne RFC. He also played Gaelic football at minor (U18) level with the Meath county team. He was educated at a boys' Catholic school, St Mary's Diocesan School in Drogheda, and was a member of their rugby team. He joined Lansdowne on leaving school in 1997.

== Club career ==
Horgan made his debut for Leinster in 1998. He played for Leinster 87 times in the Heineken Cup, ranking fifth in career Heineken Cup appearances. He scored 27 tries during his Heineken Cup career, ranking him eighth (as of 22 February 2023) on the list of most career tries scored in Heineken Cup competition. His most prolific Heineken Cup season was 2004–05, when Horgan was the leading try scorer with eight tries. He was a member of a Leinster backline which included Brian O'Driscoll, Gordon D'Arcy, Denis Hickie, Felipe Contepomi, Isa Nacewa, Rob Kearney and Johnny Sexton.

== International career ==
Horgan made his debut for the Ireland senior side against Scotland in the 2000 Six Nations Championship, scoring a try in the process. In the following game against Italy he scored two tries and added another one against Wales during the tournament. He was selected for the 2005 British & Irish Lions tour to New Zealand. He was used as a substitute during all three tests. After scoring the winning try against England at Twickenham in the 2006 Six Nations Championship to secure the Triple Crown for the second time in three years, he became a new national hero. Horgan added to his following in 2007 when he scored a try against England in Croke Park by executing a Gaelic football style catch from a Ronan O'Gara crossfield kick. Horgan is known by the Irish media and rugby fans as "Shaggy".

Horgan showed a return to something near the levels of performance of his earlier career in early 2011, but injury towards the end of the club season forced him to miss out on the 2011 Rugby World Cup.

On 28 March 2012, Horgan announced his retirement with immediate effect having failed to regain full fitness following surgery on a long-term knee injury.

== Honours ==
Individual

- Leinster all-time leading try scorer: (69)
- Leinster Supporter's Player Player of the Year (1): 2010–11

Leinster

- Celtic League (2): 2001–02, 2007–08
- Heineken Cup (2): 2008–09, 2010–11

Ireland

- Six Nations (1): 2009

== Personal life ==
Horgan studied law at Portobello College.

He is completing a master's degree at Trinity College Dublin.

As of 2016, he was working as a trainee solicitor at Lee & Thompson in London, while appearing on RTÉ Sport as an analyst in their rugby coverage. After leaving RTÉ Sport, he joined TV3 for the station's Six Nations coverage.
