= Barry Everitt (rugby union) =

Irish rugby union footballer and teacher

Barry Everitt (born 9 March 1976) is an Irish teacher and former rugby union player who played at fly-half for Garryowen FC, Munster, Leinster, London Irish and Northampton Saints. He started in the 2002 Powergen Cup Final at Twickenham, scoring five conversions and a penalty as London Irish defeated the Northampton Saints.

Everitt was called up to the senior Ireland squad for a Test against Samoa in November 2001. He won three trophies in his time at Northampton; the RFU Championship in 2008, the European Rugby Challenge Cup in 2009 and the Anglo-Welsh Cup in 2010. Everitt holds the record for the most individual points scored in a Premiership Season, having scored 343 points for London Irish in the 2001/02 season.

Everitt played for the Barbarians in June 2002 against Scotland in Murrayfield.

Retiring from rugby in July 2010, Everitt was appointed Director of Sport at Cranmore, an independent day school for boys and girls in West Horsley, Surrey. As of September 2020, he is now Headmaster.
