= John Kelly (rugby union, born 1974) =

Irish rugby union player

- Born: John P. Kelly; 18 April 1974 (age 52) Dublin, Republic of Ireland
- Height: 1.78 m (5 ft 10 in)
- Weight: 89 kg (196 lb)
- School: St. Francis College Rochestown
- University: University College Cork

Rugby union career
- Position(s): Wing, Centre
Amateur team(s)
Years	Team	Apps	(Points)
- Cork Con
Senior career
Years	Team	Apps	(Points)
1997–2007	Munster	154	(170)
- Correct as of 4 Dec 2011
International career
Years	Team	Apps	(Points)
2000-06	Ireland A	11	(15)
2002-03	Ireland	17	(40)
- Correct as of 4 Dec 2011

John Kelly (born 18 April 1974) is a retired Irish rugby union footballer. He played for Munster in the Celtic League and the Heineken Cup, and played for Cork Constitution in the All Ireland League (AIL).

== Munster ==
Kelly made his Munster debut against Cardiff Blues in September 1997. He scored his first try for Munster in this game.

He was part of the Munster team that lost to Northampton Saints in the 2000 Heineken Cup Final, and he was again on the losing side when Munster lost to Leicester Tigers in the 2002 Heineken Cup Final.

Kelly was part of the famous Munster team that beat Gloucester in the 'Miracle Match'. Munster required a try bonus-point, as well as a victory margin of 27 points, to advance to the quarter-finals of the 2002–03 Heineken Cup, and Kelly scored two tries as Munster won 33–6.

He won the 2002–03 Celtic League with Munster, when they beat Neath to secure the title.

He missed the 2005 Celtic Cup Final against Llanelli Scarlets through injury, a game which Munster won.

In May 2006, Kelly was part of the Munster team that won the province's first Heineken Cup, defeating Biarritz Olympique 19–23 in the 2006 Heineken Cup Final.

In December 2007, Kelly announced that he would retire from rugby when his contract expired at the end of that month. He captained Munster in his final game for the province against Connacht, a game that was won by Munster. He was replaced with a minute to go in the 17–0 victory, to a tremendous reaction from the crowd, and was later chaired off the pitch by his peers. After the game, Kelly officially retired from club and international rugby.

== Ireland ==
Kelly made his debut for Ireland against Italy in March 2002, in a 2002 Six Nations Championship game at Lansdowne Road. He scored two tries on his debut.

He was selected in Ireland's squad for the 2003 Rugby World Cup in Australia, and featured in the pool games against Romania, Namibia and Australia. He also played in the quarter-final against France.

The World Cup quarter-final against France turned out to be Kelly's final appearance for Ireland. Despite being named in squads over the coming seasons, injury always struck before Kelly could add to his caps.
