= Girvan Dempsey =

Irish former rugby union footballer

- Born: 2 October 1975 (age 51) Dublin, Ireland
- Height: 6 ft 0 in (1.83 m)
- Weight: 14 st 5 lb (91 kg)
- School: Terenure College
- University: National University of Ireland

Rugby union career
- Position: Fullback
Senior career
Years	Team	Apps	(Points)
1993–2010	Terenure College		
- Correct as of 2007-03-06
Provincial / State sides
Years	Team	Apps	(Points)
1996–2010	Leinster Rugby	173	(194)
- Correct as of 20 December 2020
International career
Years	Team	Apps	(Points)
1998–2008	Ireland	82	(95)
- Correct as of 2007-03-06

Girvan Dempsey (born 2 October 1975 in Dublin) is an Irish former rugby union footballer who played at full back for Leinster and Ireland.

== Rugby career ==
Educated at Terenure College and the National University of Ireland, Dempsey played rugby for Ireland Under-21 and 'A' teams before debuting for the senior team as a replacement against Georgia in November 1998 in which he scored two tries. He became a first choice player in 2000 and played in all five of Ireland's matches at the 2003 Rugby World Cup.

He reached a milestone when winning his 50th cap in the 2004 summer tour's second Test against South Africa, and is currently the joint-fourth most-capped Irish player in history, with nine of his appearances as a winger between 1998 and 2005.

Dempsey's senior career will probably be most remembered for his try in the left corner at Twickenham in 2004 which helped Ireland on their way to securing their first Triple Crown since 1985.

He helped Ireland to a 2006 Triple Crown victory in Ireland's 28–24 victory over England and Leinster to their first ever Heineken Cup win. He also won the Celtic League with Leinster.

Dempsey announced that he would retire from rugby union at the end of the 2009–10 season, a week after Leinster were knocked out of the 2009–10 Heineken Cup. He finished his career with 82 caps for Ireland, scoring 95 points (19 tries), putting him 4th on the Irish all-time international try scorer list. He was capped 198 times for Leinster, scoring 184 points.

== Honours ==
=== Ireland ===
- Triple Crown: 2004, 2006, 2007

=== Leinster ===
- Heineken Cup: 2008–09
- Celtic League: 2007–08
- Celtic League: 2001–02
