= Gordon D'Arcy =

Irish rugby union player

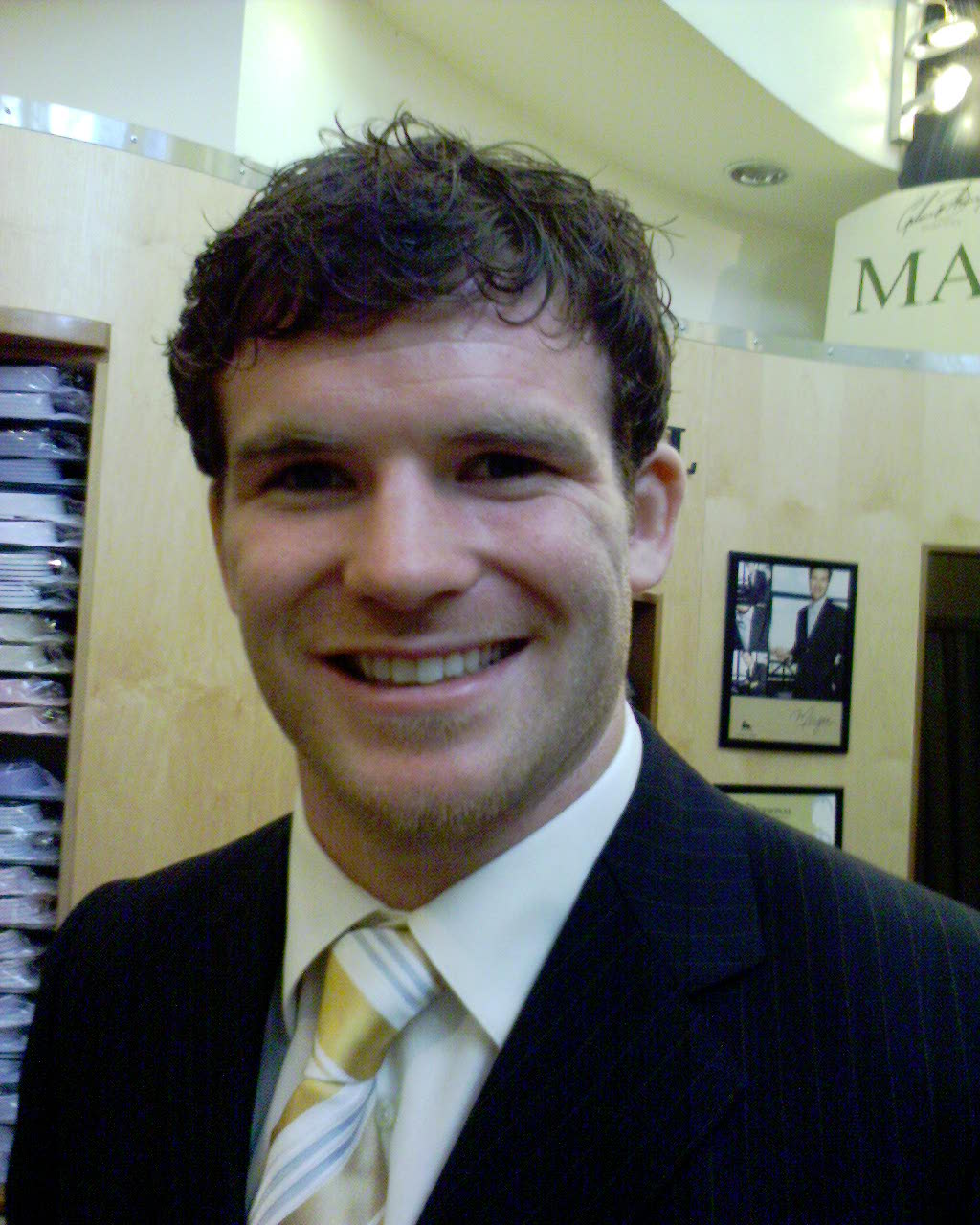
- Born: 10 February 1980 (age 46) Ferns, County Wexford, Ireland
- Height: 5 ft 11 in (1.80 m)
- Weight: 14 st 4 lb (91 kg)
- School: Clongowes Wood College
- University: University College Dublin

Rugby union career
- Position: Inside Centre
Amateur team(s)
Years	Team	Apps	(Points)
- Lansdowne FC
–	Wexford Wanderers RFC		
Senior career
Years	Team	Apps	(Points)
1998–2015	Leinster	257	(334)
- Correct as of 15 August 2015
International career
Years	Team	Apps	(Points)
1997	Ireland Schools	3	
1998	Ireland U-19s	1	
1999–2000	Ireland U-21s	7	
1999–2015	Ireland Wolfhounds	11	(10)
1999–2015	Ireland	82	(35)
2005, 2009	British & Irish Lions	1	(0)
- Correct as of 15 August 2015

Gordon William D'Arcy (born 10 February 1980, in Ferns, County Wexford) is a retired Irish rugby player who was selected for two British & Irish Lions tours. He played most of his career at inside centre for Irish provincial side Leinster. He is second on the record list for most Leinster appearances at 257 and third on the all-time Leinster try list with 60. He was registered to club side Lansdowne.

D'Arcy retired from rugby in 2015, having won three Heineken Cups, a Challenge Cup and four league titles with Leinster, two Six Nations titles with Ireland, including a Grand Slam in 2009.

== Early life and education ==
D'Arcy graduated from Clongowes Wood in 1998. He enrolled in UCD 1st year arts for the academic year 2007/08.

== Rugby playing career ==
D'Arcy was a promising fullback for schools side Clongowes Wood in the late 1990s, and on the eve of his Leaving Cert was called into the Irish squad for the tour of South Africa by coach Warren Gatland. However, because of his studies he declined the opportunity. On leaving school he joined the Lansdowne Football Club and made his Ireland debut on 15 October 1999 as a substitute against Romania during the World Cup.

Following a falling out with his provincial coaches regarding his attitude – which almost drove him to retire from the game – D'Arcy was left out of the international setup for three years. His second game for his country came on 17 November 2002 as a late substitute in Ireland's 64–17 win over Fiji. He made a further three appearances as a substitute during 2003. He was not selected for the Irish squad for the 2003 Rugby World Cup in Australia, but was picked for the Leinster team during the absence of its World Cup players. It was then that he came into his own, playing some of the best rugby of his career at fullback/wing, where he displayed delightful skill in running from deep and finishing off the moves that he had started. After the World Cup, an injury to Brian O'Driscoll, his Leinster teammate, saw D'Arcy move to outside centre, where he made a great impression.

Owing to the further absence of O'Driscoll from the Irish squad for the first match of the Six Nations in that season against France, D'Arcy found himself in the number 13 jersey at international level. Such was his form that, on O'Driscoll's return, he kept his place, allowing the selectors to experiment with O'Driscoll at inside centre.

He was voted player of the Six Nations tournament in 2004 as he helped inspire his country to the Triple Crown for the first time since 1985. What most impressed supporters was his ability to wrong-foot the flat-defence off passes from O'Driscoll and to create space out of nothing; this was particularly appreciated in his performance against England at Twickenham. It seemed that a new type of centre partnership had been created, which superseded the grinding format preferred by international coaches, of using a crash centre at no.12 and ignoring the possibilities of quick offloads in the centre of the field. The new centre combination was also impressive in its hard and intelligent defence, which often converted into successful counter-attack. D'Arcy was nominated for IRB Player of the Year in 2004

Despite an injury plagued 2004–05 season, D'Arcy was named in the British & Irish Lions squad for their 2005 tour to New Zealand. But his performances during the tour were generally poor, and he reputedly refused to play in the final test against New Zealand, though he vehemently denies this. There were fears at that stage that his form during the 2003–04 season would prove to have been a flash in the pan. However, he has been back fully fit for Leinster and Ireland in the 2005/06 season and has impressed in a new-look, much more attack minded Leinster team.

D'Arcy played in all of Ireland's 2006 Six Nations matches, he beat more defenders than any other player, and showed his talent. His return to top form continued during the autumn international series where his performances against Australia and South Africa contributed to back – to – back victories for the Irish team. D'Arcy usually played at inside centre for Leinster and Ireland with O'Driscoll outside him. He played in all of Ireland's 2007 Six Nations matches, he was nominated for RBS Six Nations Player of the Tournament in 2007. After sustaining a multiple fracture in his arm in the opening match of the 2008 Six Nations, versus Italy, D'Arcy missed the remainder of the season and only returned to Leinster in December 2008. He was a member of the victorious Ireland team that won the 2009 Six Nations Championship and Grand Slam.

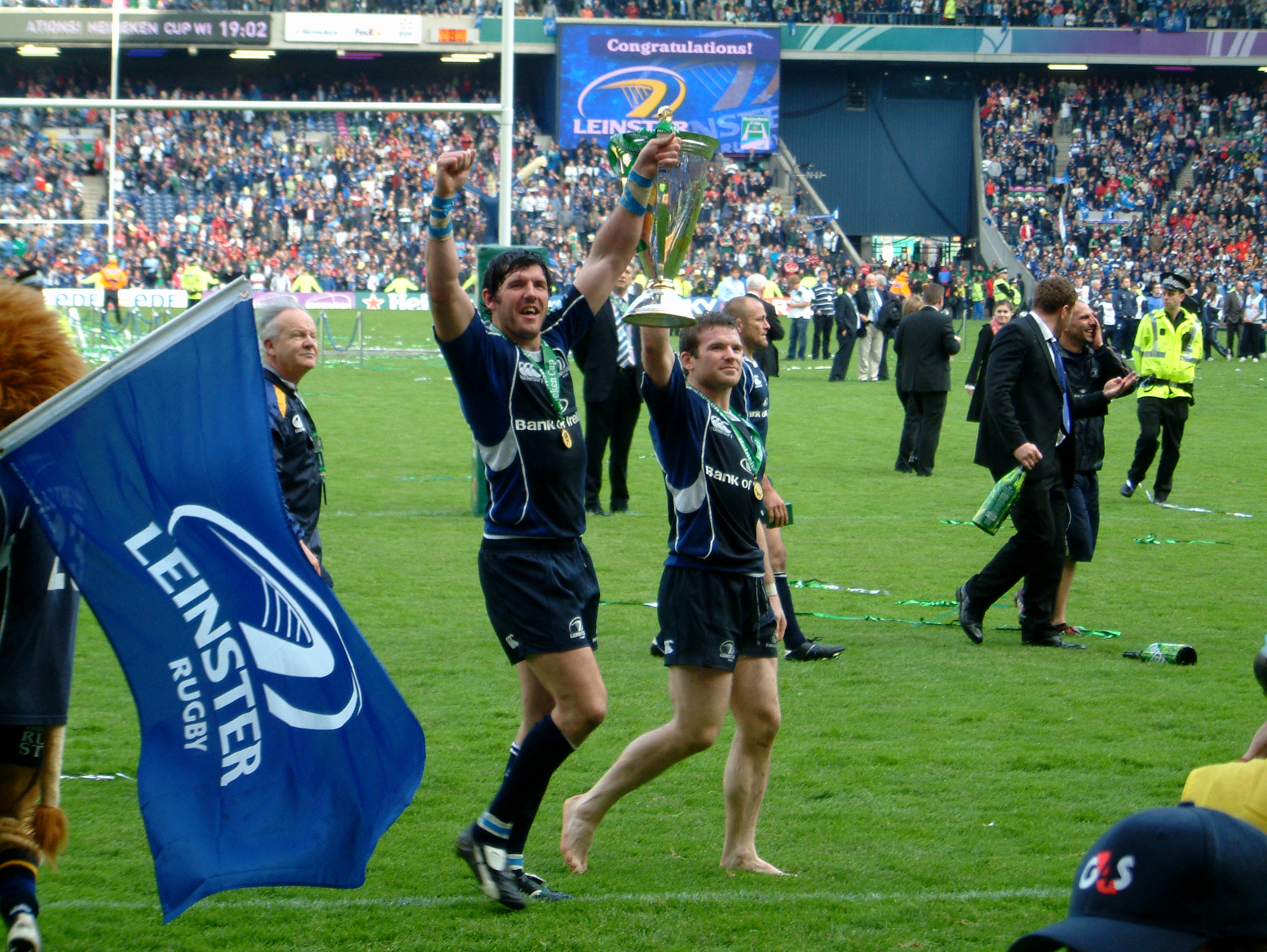
D'Arcy and Shane Horgan celebrate their 2009 Heineken Cup Final win

In May 2009, D'Arcy was named in the Barbarians squad to play England and Australia along with Ireland teammate Geordan Murphy and Leinster colleague Rocky Elsom., the Barbarians ended up beating England by 33 points to 26, with D'Arcy scoring one of the tries. On 3 June 2009, D'Arcy was called up for the British & Irish Lions squad for the tour in South Africa due to injuries in the squad. He featured for Ireland against Fiji and South Africa during the 2009 November Tests, and started every game in the 2010 Six Nations. He started against New Zealand in the 2010 Summer Tests and scored 1 try, but a groin problem kept him out of Ireland's remaining test against Australia. He earned his 50th cap against South Africa on 6 November 2010.

D'Arcy was named in the Ireland Rugby World Cup 2011 squad. In the Australia v Ireland match at the 2011 World Cup, D'Arcy and O'Driscoll set the world record for most appearances as a centre partnership together in international rugby, at 45 appearances. This broke the previous record set by Will Carling and Jeremy Guscott.

== Career after rugby ==
D'Arcy combined writing opinion pieces for the Irish Times focused on rugby.

== Personal life ==
In July 2012, D'Arcy married model Aoife Cogan at St. Macartan's Cathedral, Monaghan. The couple are also business partners in Form School, a reformer pilates studio on Grattan Street, in Dublin. In February 2015 it was announced that D'Arcy and Cogan were expecting their first child and a baby girl, named Soleil, was born in May 2015.

D'Arcy grew a beard which attracted much attention and was shaved off by Jonathan Sexton after Ireland won the 2014 Six Nations Championship.

Gordon D'Arcy is a patron for Barretstown charity.

== Honours ==
Individual

- Six Nations Player of the Tournament: (1) 2004

Leinster

- Celtic League: (4) 2001–2002, 2007–2008, 2012–2013, 2013–2014
- Heineken European Cup: (3) 2008–2009, 2010–2011, 2011–2012
- Amlin European Challenge Cup: 2012–2013

Ireland

- Six Nations Championship: 2009, 2014
- Grand Slam: 2009
- Triple Crown: 2004, 2006, 2007, 2009
