= Ireland national rugby union team tours =

This article is a list of statistics from the Ireland rugby union team's 35 international tours. The article also includes details of the Ireland Wolfhounds' and Developmental sides' three international tours.

== Ireland Rugby Tours ==
Year	To	Captain	Head coach	Result	Score
1899	Canada	(Leinster) James Franks		N/A	N/A
1952	Chile & Argentina	(Leinster) Des O'Brien	GPS Hogan	Won	1–1–0
1961	South Africa	(Leinster) Ronnie Dawson	(Munster) Noel Murphy	Lost	0–1
1967	Australia	(Munster) Tom Kiernan	(Leinster) Eugene Davy	Won	1–0
1970	Argentina	(Munster) Tom Kiernan	E. Patterson	Lost	0–2
1976	New Zealand & Fiji	(Leinster) Tom Grace	K. Quilligan	Lost; Won	0–1 (New Zealand); 1–0 (Fiji)
1979	Australia	(Leinster) Fergus Slattery	J. Coffey	Won	2–0
1981	South Africa	(Leinster) Fergus Slattery	P. Madigan	Lost	0–2
1985	Japan	(Connacht) Ciaran Fitzgerald	(Ulster) Des McKibbin	Won	2–0
1988	France	(Ulster) Willie Anderson	(Ulster) Jimmy Davidson	N/A	N/A
1989	Canada & United States	(Ulster) Willie Anderson	(Ulster) Jimmy Davidson	Won; Won	1–0 (Canada); 1–0 (United States)
1991	Namibia	(Ulster) Phillip Matthews	(Connacht) Ciaran Fitzgerald	Lost	0–2
1992	New Zealand	(Munster) Phil Danaher	(Leinster) Gerry Murphy	Lost	0–2
1994	Australia	(Munster) Michael Bradley	(Leinster) Gerry Murphy	Lost	0–2
1998	South Africa	(Ulster) Paddy Johns	(New Zealand) Warren Gatland	Lost	0–2
1999	Australia	(Ulster) (Munster) Dion O'Cuinneagain	(New Zealand) Warren Gatland	Lost	0–2
2000	Argentina, United States & Canada	(Munster) Keith Wood	(New Zealand) Warren Gatland	Lost; Won; Drew	0–1 (Argentina); 1–0 (United States); 0–0 (Canada)
2002	New Zealand	(Munster) Keith Wood	(Munster) Eddie O'Sullivan	Lost	0–2
2003	Australia, Tonga & Samoa	(Ulster) David Humphreys (Leinster) Reggie Corrigan	(Munster) Eddie O'Sullivan	Lost; Won; Won	0–1 (Australia); 1–0 (Tonga); 1–0 (Samoa)
2004	South Africa	(Leinster) Brian O'Driscoll	(Munster) Eddie O'Sullivan	Lost	0–2
2005	Japan	(Ulster) David Humphreys	(Munster) Niall O'Donovan	Won	2–0
2006	New Zealand & Australia	(Leinster) Brian O'Driscoll	(Munster) Eddie O'Sullivan	Lost; Lost	0–2 (New Zealand); 0–1 (Australia)
2007	Argentina	(Ulster) Simon Best	(Munster) Eddie O'Sullivan	Lost	0–2
2008	New Zealand & Australia	(Leinster) Brian O'Driscoll	(Munster) Michael Bradley	Lost; Lost	0–1 (New Zealand); 0–1 (Australia)
2009	Canada & United States	(Ulster) Rory Best	(Munster) Declan Kidney	Won; Won	1–0 (Canada); 1–0 (United States)
2010	New Zealand & Australia	(Leinster) Brian O'Driscoll	(Munster) Declan Kidney	Lost	0–1 (New Zealand); 0–1 (Australia)
2012	New Zealand	(Leinster) Brian O'Driscoll	(Munster) Declan Kidney	Lost	0–3 (New Zealand)
2013	Canada & United States	(Munster) Peter O'Mahony	(Australia) Les Kiss	Won	1–0 (Canada); 1–0 (United States)
2014	Argentina	(Munster) Paul O'Connell	(New Zealand) Joe Schmidt	Won	2–0
2016	South Africa	(Ulster) Rory Best	(New Zealand) Joe Schmidt	Lost	1–2
2017	Japan	(Leinster) Rhys Ruddock	(New Zealand) Joe Schmidt	Won	2–0
2018	Australia	(Ulster) Rory Best	(New Zealand) Joe Schmidt	Won	2–1
2022	New Zealand	(Leinster) Johnny Sexton	(England) Andy Farrell	Won	2–1
2024	South Africa	(Munster) Peter O'Mahony/ (Leinster) Caelan Doris	(England) Andy Farrell	Drew	1–1
2025	Georgia & Portugal	(Munster) Craig Casey	(Munster) Paul O'Connell	Won	1–0 (Georgia); 1–0 (Portugal)

=== Tour Statistics ===
Flag	Nation or Nations	From	To	Test Matches				Tour Matches				Total Record							
Flag	Nation or Nations	From	To	P	W	D	L	P	W	D	L	P	W	D	L	%	PF	PA	PD
(Canada)	1889 tour of Canada	12 October	6 November	-	-	-	-	11	10	-	1	11	10	-	1	90.91%	150	50	+100
(Chile) (Argentina)	1952 tour of South America; Test Series; Ireland 1–1–0 Argentina	1 August	3 September	-	-	-	-	9	6	2	1	9	6	2	1	66.67%	126	43	+83
(South Africa)	1961 tour of South Africa; Test Series; Ireland 0–1 South Africa	13 May	24 May	1	-	-	1	3	3	-	-	4	3	-	1	75%	59	36	+23
(Australia)	1967 tour of Australia; Test Series; Ireland 1–0 Australia	1 May	20 May	1	1	-	-	5	3	-	2	6	4	-	2	66.67%	119	80	+39
(Argentina)	1970 tour of Argentina; Test Series; Ireland 0–2 Argentina	30 August	20 September	-	-	-	-	7	4	-	3	7	4	-	3	85.71%	73	57	+16
(New Zealand) (Fiji)	1976 tour of New Zealand & Fiji; Test Series; Ireland 0–1 New Zealand; Ireland 1–0 Fiji (Tour Match)	15 May	9 June	1	-	-	1	7	5	-	2	8	5	-	3	57.14%	88	68	+20
(Australia)	1979 tour of Australia; Test Series; Ireland 2–0 Australia	20 May	16 June	2	2	-	-	6	5	-	1	8	7	-	1	87.5%	184	75	+109
(South Africa)	1981 tour of South Africa; Test Series; Ireland 0–2 South Africa	16 May	6 June	2	-	-	2	5	3	-	2	7	3	-	4	42.86%	207	90	+117
(Japan)	1985 tour of Japan; Test Series; Ireland 2–0 Japan	19 May	2 June	-	-	-	-	5	5	-	-	5	5	-	-	100%	201	66	+135
(France)	1988 tour of France; Test Series	May	22 May	-	-	-	-	4	1	-	3	4	1	-	3	25%	75	104	-29
(Canada) (United States)	1989 tour of North America; Test Series; Ireland 1–0 Canada; Ireland 1–0 United States	30 August	9 September	-	-	-	-	4	4	-	-	4	4	-	-	100%	135	52	+83
(Namibia)	1991 tour of Namibia; Test Series; Ireland 0–2 Namibia	17 June	27 June	2	-	-	2	2	2	-	-	4	2	-	2	50%	101	61	+40
(New Zealand)	1992 tour of New Zealand; Test Series; Ireland 0–2 New Zealand	16 May	6 June	2	-	-	2	6	3	-	3	8	3	-	5	37.5%	153	287	-134
(Australia)	1994 tour of Australia; Test Series; Ireland 0–2 Australia	18 May	11 June	2	-	-	2	6	2	-	4	8	2	-	6	25%	177	254	-77
(South Africa)	1998 tour of South Africa; Test Series; Ireland 0–2 South Africa	30 May	20 June	2	-	-	2	5	2	-	3	7	2	-	5	28.57%	113	144	-31
(Australia)	1999 tour of Australia; Test Series; Ireland 0–2 Australia	31 May	19 June	2	-	-	2	2	1	-	1	4	1	-	3	25%	103	123	-20
(Argentina) (Canada) (United States)	2000 Ireland rugby union tour of the Americas; Test Series; Ireland 0–1 Argentina; Ireland 0–1–0 Canada; Ireland 1–0 United States	3 June	17 June	3	1	1	1	-	-	-	-	3	1	1	1	33.33%	133	64	+69
(New Zealand)	2002 tour of New Zealand; Test Series; Ireland 0–2 New Zealand	8 June	22 June	2	-	-	2	1	1	-	-	3	1	-	2	33.33%	70	58	+12
(Australia) (Tonga) (Samoa)	2003 Ireland rugby union tour of the Southern Hemisphere; Test Series; Ireland 0–1 Australia; Ireland 1–0 Tonga; Ireland 1–0 Western Samoa	7 June	20 June	3	2	-	1	-	-	-	-	3	1	-	2	66.67%	96	78	+18
(South Africa)	2004 tour of South Africa; Test Series; Ireland 0–2 South Africa	12 June	19 June	2	-	-	2	-	-	-	-	2	-	-	2	0%	34	57	-23
(Japan)	2005 tour of Japan; Test Series; Ireland 2–0 Japan	12 June	19 June	2	2	-	-	-	-	-	-	2	2	-	-	100%	91	30	+61
(Australia) (New Zealand)	2006 tour of New Zealand and Australia; Test Series; Ireland 0–1 Australia; Ireland 0–2 All Blacks	10 June	24 June	3	-	-	3	-	-	-	-	3	-	-	3	0%	55	98	-43
(Argentina)	2007 tour of Argentina; Test Series; Ireland 0–2 Argentina	26 May	2 June	2	-	-	2	-	-	-	-	2	-	-	2	0%	20	38	-18
(Australia) (New Zealand)	2008 tour of New Zealand and Australia; Test Series; Ireland 0–1 Australia; Ireland 0–1 All Blacks	7 June	14 June	2	-	-	2	-	-	-	-	2	-	-	2	0%	23	39	-16
(Canada) (United States)	2009 tour of North America; Test Series; Ireland 1–0 Canada; Ireland 1–0 United States	23 May	24 June	2	2	-	-	-	-	-	-	2	2	-	-	100%	52	16	+36
(Australia) (New Zealand)	2010 tour of New Zealand and Australia; Test Series; Ireland 0–1 Australia; Ireland 0–1 All Blacks	12 June	26 June	2	-	-	2	1	-	-	1	3	-	-	3	0%	71	118	-47
(New Zealand)	2012 tour of New Zealand; Test Series; Ireland 0–3 All Blacks	9 June	23 June	3	-	-	3	-	-	-	-	3	-	-	3	0%	29	124	-47
(Canada) (United States)	2013 tour of North America; Test Series; Ireland 1–0 Canada; Ireland 1–0 United States	8 June	15 June	2	2	-	-	-	-	-	-	2	2	-	-	100%	55	26	+29
(Argentina)	2014 tour of Argentina; Test Series; Ireland 2–0 Argentina	7 June	14 June	2	2	-	-	-	-	-	-	2	2	-	-	100%	52	34	+18
(South Africa)	2016 tour of South Africa; Test Series; Ireland 1–2 South Africa	11 June	25 June	2	1	-	2	-	-	-	-	3	1	-	2	33.33%	65	71	-6
(Japan)	2017 tour of Japan; Test Series; Ireland 2–0 Japan	17 June	24 June	2	2	-	-	-	-	-	-	2	2	-	-	100%	85	35	+50
(Australia)	2018 tour of Australia; Test Series; Ireland 2–1 Australia	9 June	23 June	3	2	-	1	-	-	-	-	3	2	-	1	66.67%	55	55	0
(New Zealand)	2022 tour of New Zealand; Test Series; Ireland 2–1 New Zealand	29 June	16 July	3	2	-	1	2	1	-	1	5	3	-	2	60%	121	132	-11
(South Africa)	2024 tour of South Africa; Test Series; Ireland 1–1 South Africa	6 July	13 July	2	1	-	1	-	-	-	-	2	1	-	1	50%	45	51	-6
(Georgia (country)) (Portugal)	2025 Georgia & Portugal; Test Series; Ireland 1–0 Georgia; Ireland 1–0 Portugal	5 July	12 July	2	2	-	-	-	-	-	-	2	2	-	-	100%	140	12	+128
Total	35 Tours	—	—	60	24	1	37	91	61	2	28	153	84	3	66	54.9%	3,356	2,726	+630

== Ireland A, Emerging Ireland & Development Rugby Tours ==
Year	To	Captain	Head coach	Result	Score
1993	South Africa, Namibia, Zimbabwe	(Leinster) Kevin Potts	(Leinster) Gerry Murphy	Won	1–0 (Zimbabwe)
1997	Oceania	(Leinster) Gabriel Fulcher (Leinster) Gary Halpin	(England) Brian Ashton	Lost	0–1 (Western Samoa XV)
2022	South Africa	(Leinster) Max Deegan (Connacht) Cian Prendergast	(Ireland) Simon Easterby	Won	3–0 (All tour matches)

=== Tour Statistics ===
Flag	Nation or Nations	From	To	Test Matches				Tour Matches				Total Record							
Flag	Nation or Nations	From	To	P	W	D	L	P	W	D	L	P	W	D	L	%	PF	PA	PD
(South Africa) (Namibia) (Zimbabwe)	1993 South Africa, Namibia, Zimbabwe tour	21 July	11 August	1	1	-	-	6	5	-	1	7	6	-	1	85.71%	219	103	+116
(New Zealand) (Samoa)	1997 Oceania tour	22 May	14 June	1	-	-	1	6	1	-	5	7	1	-	6	14.29%	169	337	-168
(South Africa)	2022 South Africa tour	30 September	9 October	-	-	-	-	3	3	-	-	3	3	-	-	100%	103	45	+58
Total	3 Tours	—	—	2	1	0	1	15	9	0	6	17	10	0	7	58.82%	491	485	+6
