= 1992 Ireland rugby union tour of New Zealand =

- Top test point scorer: Greg Cooper (31)
- Top test try scorer: Frank Bunce (4)
Summary
P	W	D	L
Total
8	3	0	5
Test match
2	0	0	2
Opponent
P	W	D	L
New Zealand
2	0	0	2

Tour chronology
- ← Namibia 1991 Australia 1994 →

1992 Ireland rugby union tour of New Zealand. The Ireland national rugby union team embarked on their second tour of New Zealand, having previously visited in 1976. The tour party included father and son – tour manager Noel Murphy and his son Kenny Murphy. In 1993 Mick Galwey, Vince Cunningham, Richard Wallace and Nick Popplewell all returned to New Zealand with the British and Irish Lions.

== Non-international matches ==
13 May 1992

South Canterbury	16–21	Ireland
Try: Barry Matthews; Con: Barry Fairbrother (0/1); Pen: Barry Fairbrother (3/3); Drop: Barry Fairbrother (1/1)		Try: Richard Wallace; Michael Bradley; Nick Popplewell; Con: Peter Russell (3/3); Pen: Peter Russell (1/1)

Fraser Park, Timaru
Attendance: 8,000
Referee: Lindsay McLauchlan (Otago)

16 May 1992

Canterbury	38–13	Ireland
Try: Andrew McCormick; Kose Seinafo; Paula Bale; Dion Kerr (2); Graeme Bachop; Dallas Seymour; Penalty try Con: Greg Coffey (3/8)		Try: Richard Wallace; Noel Mannion; Con: Derek McAleese (1/2); Pen: Derek McAleese (1/1)

Lancaster Park, Christchurch
Attendance: 9,500
Referee: David Bishop (Southland)

20 May 1992

Bay of Plenty	23–39	Ireland
Try: Troy Jennings; Milton Haig; Martin Jones; Rex George; Con: Erin Cossey (2/4); Pen: Erin Cossey (1/1)		Try: Kenny Murphy; Ronald Carey; Mick Galwey (2); Con: Peter Russell (3/3); Derek McAleese (1/1); Pen: Peter Russell (3/3); Derek McAleese (1/1); Drop: Peter Russell (1/1)

Rotorua Stadium, Rotorua
Attendance: 7,000
Referee: Colin Hawke (South Canterbury)

23 May 1992

Auckland	62–7	Ireland
Try: Shane Howarth (3); John Kirwan (2); Eroni Clarke; Grant Fox; Mark Carter; Robin Brooke; Sean Fitzpatrick; Olo Brown; Con: Grant Fox (9/11)		Try: Neville Furlong; Con: Mark McCall (0/1); Pen: Mark McCall (1/1)

Eden Park, Auckland
Attendance: 17,000
Referee: Keith Lawrence (Bay of Plenty)

26 May 1992

Poverty Bay – East Coast	7–22	Ireland
Try: Johnny Martin; Con: Eli Manuel (0/1); Pen: Eli Manuel (1/1)		Try: Martin Ridge; Noel Mannion; Brian Rigney; Con: Derek McAleese (2/3); Pen: Derek McAleese (2/2)

Rugby Park, Gisborne
Attendance: 3,000
Referee: Rod Hill (Wellington)

2 June 1992

Manawatu	58–24	Ireland
Try: Sam Doyle (3); Jody Smith; Lee Stensness (2); Steven Hall; Mana Otai; Stu Cruden; Robbie McLean; Con: Jody Smith (6/10); Pen: Jody Smith (2/2)		Try: Kenny Murphy; Jack Clarke; Fergus Aherne (2); Con: Derek McAleese (0/3); Kenny Murphy (1/1); Pen: Derek McAleese (2/2)

The Showgrounds Oval, Palmerston North
Attendance: 6,000
Referee: Glenn Wahlstrom (Auckland)

== Test matches ==
30 May 1992

New Zealand	24–21	Ireland
Try: Frank Bunce (2); Eroni Clarke; Paul Henderson; Con: Greg Cooper (4)	Report	Try: Jim Staples; Vince Cunningham (2); Con: Peter Russell (3/3); Pen: Peter Russell (1/1)

Carisbrook, Dunedin
Attendance: 28,000
Referee: Sandy MacNeill (Australia)

6 June 1992

New Zealand	59–6	Ireland
Try: Frank Bunce (2); Eroni Clarke; Greg Cooper (2); Ian Jones; John Kirwan; Arran Pene (2); Ant Strachan; John Timu; Con: Greg Cooper (6/11); Pen: Greg Cooper (1/1)	Report	Try: Neville Furlong; Con: Peter Russell (1/1)

Athletic Park, Wellington
Attendance: 25,000
Referee: Sandy MacNeill (Australia)

== Touring party ==
- Tour Manager: Noel Murphy
- Team Manager: Ciaran Fitzgerald
- Assistant Manager: Gerry Murphy
- Captain: Phil Danaher

=== Backs ===
- Fergus Aherne (Lansdowne)
- Michael Bradley (Cork Constitution)
- Ronald Carey (Dungannon)
- Jack Clarke (Dolphin)
- Vince Cunningham (St. Mary's College RFC)
- Phil Danaher (Garryowen)
- Neville Furlong (UCG)
- Derek McAleese (Ballymena)
- Mark McCall (Bangor)
- Kenny Murphy (Cork Constitution)
- Damian O'Brien (Clontarf)
- Martin Ridge (Blackrock College RFC)
- Peter Russell (Instonians)
- Jim Staples (London Irish)
- Richard Wallace (Garryowen)

=== Forwards ===
- Tom Clancy (Lansdowne)
- Richard Costello (Garryowen)
- J. Etheridge (Northampton)
- Mick Fitzgibbon (Shannon)
- Mick Galwey (Shannon)
- Gary Halpin (London Irish)
- Paddy Johns (Dungannon)
- Paddy Kenny (Wanderers)
- Terry Kingston (Dolphin)
- Kelvin Leahy (Wanderers)
- Noel Mannion (Lansdowne)
- Denis McBride (Malone)
- Paul McCarthy (Cork Constitution)
- Nick Popplewell (Greystones)
- Brian Rigney (Greystones)
- Brian Robinson (Ballymena)
- Steve Smith (Ballymena)

== See also ==
- History of rugby union matches between All Blacks and Ireland
