= 1998 Ireland rugby union tour of South Africa =

Series of rugby matches played by the Irish national team

- Manager: Donal Lenihan
- Coach: Warren Gatland
- Tour captain: Paddy Johns
- Top test point scorer: Stefan Terblanche (20)
- Top test try scorer: Stefan Terblanche (4)
Summary
P	W	D	L
Total
7	2	0	5
Test match
2	0	0	2
Opponent
P	W	D	L
South Africa
2	0	0	2

Tour chronology
- ← Australia 1994 Australia 1999 →

[[Category:1998 rugby union tours|Ireland]]

The 1998 Ireland rugby union tour of South Africa was the team's third tour to the country, having previously visited in 1961 and 1981. Both Paul Wallace and Keith Wood had previously been on a tour to South Africa with the British and Irish Lions in 1997. Cape Town-born Dion O'Cuinneagain, had captained South Africa at both schoolboy and sevens level, before he switched allegiances. He made his senior international debut for Ireland in the 37–13 defeat against South Africa on 13 June 1998. Justin Fitzpatrick and Trevor Brennan also made their senior international debuts in the same game. A fourth debutant, Justin Bishop, scored a try while Eric Elwood added a conversion and two penalties. South Africa won the series 2–0, but the series was marred by violence and ill-will between the two teams.

== Non-international matches ==
Scores and results list Ireland's points tally first.

Opposing Team	For	Against	Date	Venue
Boland Cavaliers	48	35	30 May 1998	Boland Stadium, Wellington, Western Cape
SWD Eagles	20	27	3 June 1998	Outeniqua Park, George, Western Cape
Western Province	6	12	6 June 1998	Newlands, Cape Town
Griquas	13	52	9 June 1998	Eclectic CG
Leopards	26	18	16 June 1998	Olën Park, Potchefstroom, North West

== Test matches ==
=== First Test ===
Many predicted South Africa, who were wearing white jerseys due to the colour clash with Ireland's green jumper, to win their first test match of the season comfortably. While they eventually did so, the visitors competed admirably in the first half, trailing by only three points at half time, 13−10. The Springboks, who looked rusty in the first half, finally clicked in the second half and debutant winger Stefan Terblanche scored four tries.

13 June 1998
17:00 SAST (UTC+02)

South Africa	37–13	Ireland
Try: Terblanche 3' c, 51', 56' c, 66'; Andrews 78' c Con: du Toit (3/5) 3', 56', 78'; Pen: du Toit 29', 40'	Report	Try: Bishop 20' c Con: Elwood (1/1) 20'; Pen: Elwood 7', 54'

Free State Stadium, Bloemfontein
Attendance: 26,000
Referee: Ed Morrison (England)

FB	15	Percy Montgomery
RW	14	Stefan Terblanche
OC	13	Andre Snyman
IC	12	Pieter Muller
LW	11	Pieter Rossouw
FH	10	Gaffie du Toit	Substituted off
SH	9	Joost van der Westhuizen
N8	8	Gary Teichmann (c)
BF	7	Andre Venter
OF	6	Rassie Erasmus
RL	5	Mark Andrews
LL	4	Krynauw Otto
TP	3	Adrian Garvey
HK	2	James Dalton
LP	1	Ollie le Roux
Replacements:
FH	16	Franco Smith	Substituted on
WG	17	McNeil Hendricks
HK	18	Werner Swanepoel
LK	19	Andrew Aitken
N8	20	Bobby Skinstad
PR	21	Robbie Kempson
HK	22	Naka Drotské
Coach:
(South Africa) Nick Mallett

FB	15	Conor O'Shea
RW	14	Justin Bishop
OC	13	Kevin Maggs
IC	12	Mark McCall
LW	11	Denis Hickie
FH	10	Eric Elwood
SH	9	Conor McGuinness
N8	8	Victor Costello
OF	7	Andy Ward
BF	6	Dion O'Cuinneagain
RL	5	Paddy Johns (c)
LL	4	Malcolm O'Kelly
TP	3	Paul Wallace
HK	2	Keith Wood
LP	1	Justin Fitzpatrick
Replacements:
CT	16	Rob Henderson	Substituted on
FL	17	Trevor Brennan	Substituted on
LK	18	Gabriel Fulcher	Substituted on
LK	19	David Humphreys
FL	20	Brian O'Meara
SH	21	Allen Clarke
FH	22	Peter Clohessy
Coach:
(New Zealand) Warren Gatland

=== Second Test ===
The Springboks had to make one change to their line-up for the second test in Pretoria, with Gaffie du Toit unavailable due to a rib injury and replaced by Franco Smith. The Springboks completed a shut-out to seal the series and scored five tries in the process, but the match was a very spiteful one marred by numerous cynical incidents and brawls which eventually resulted in Springbok lock Krynauw Otto getting time in the sin bin.

20 June 1998
17:00 SAST (UTC+02)

South Africa	33–0	Ireland
Try: van der Westhuizen 17'; Erasmus 35' c Dalton 40' c Teichmann 66' c Rossouw 77' c Con: Montgomery (4/5) 35', 40', 66', 77'	Report

Loftus Versfeld Stadium, Pretoria
Attendance: 34,850
Referee: Joël Dumé (France)

FB	15	Percy Montgomery
RW	14	Stefan Terblanche	(substituted off) 45'
OC	13	Andre Snyman
IC	12	Pieter Muller
LW	11	Pieter Rossouw
FH	10	Franco Smith
SH	9	Joost van der Westhuizen	(substituted off) 75'
N8	8	Gary Teichmann (c)
BF	7	Andre Venter
OF	6	Rassie Erasmus	(substituted off) 75'
RL	5	Mark Andrews
LL	4	Krynauw Otto (yellow card) 58' to 68'
TP	3	Adrian Garvey
HK	2	James Dalton	(substituted off) 64'
LP	1	Ollie le Roux	(substituted off) 56'
Replacements:
WG	16	McNeil Hendricks	(substituted on) 45'
PR	17	Robbie Kempson	(substituted on) 56'
HK	18	Naka Drotské	(substituted on) 64'
FL	19	Andrew Aitken	(substituted on) 75'
SH	20	Werner Swanepoel	(substituted on) 75'
FH	21	Henry Honiball
N8	22	Bobby Skinstad
Coach:
(South Africa) Nick Mallett

FB	15	Conor O'Shea
RW	14	Justin Bishop
OC	13	Kevin Maggs
IC	12	Mark McCall
LW	11	Denis Hickie	(substituted off) 38'
FH	10	Eric Elwood	(substituted off) 55'
SH	9	Conor McGuinness
N8	8	Victor Costello	(substituted off) 55'
OF	7	Andy Ward
BF	6	Dion O'Cuinneagain
RL	5	Paddy Johns (c)
LL	4	Malcolm O'Kelly
TP	3	Paul Wallace
HK	2	Keith Wood
LP	1	Justin Fitzpatrick	(substituted off) 63'
Replacements:
FH	16	David Humphreys	(substituted on) 55'
CT	17	Rob Henderson	(substituted on) 38'
FL	18	Trevor Brennan	(substituted on) 55'
PR	19	Peter Clohessy	(substituted on) 63'
FL	20	Brian O'Meara
LK	21	Gabriel Fulcher
FH	22	Allen Clarke
Coach:
(New Zealand) Warren Gatland

== Touring party ==
- Manager: Donal Lenihan
- Assistant Manager: Phil Danaher
- Coach: Warren Gatland
- Captain: Paddy Johns

=== Backs ===
- Jonny Bell (Northampton)
- Justin Bishop (London Irish)
- Ciaran Clarke (Terenure College RFC)
- Eric Elwood (Galwegians RFC)
- D. Hegarty (Terenure College RFC)
- Rob Henderson (London Wasps)
- Denis Hickie (St. Mary's College RFC)
- David Humphreys (London Irish)
- Killian Keane (Garryowen)
- Kevin Maggs (Bristol)
- Mark McCall (London Irish)
- Conor McGuinness (St. Mary's College RFC)
- Brian O'Meara (Cork Constitution)
- Conor O'Shea (London Irish)
- James Topping (Ballymena RFC)
- Richard Wallace (Saracens)

=== Forwards ===
- Trevor Brennan (Bective Rangers)
- Allen Clarke (Northampton)
- D. Clohessy (Young Munster)
- Peter Clohessy (Young Munster)
- David Corkery (Bristol)
- Reggie Corrigan (Greystones RFC)
- Victor Costello (St. Mary's College RFC)
- Justin Fitzpatrick (London Irish)
- Anthony Foley (Shannon)
- Gabriel Fulcher (London Irish)
- Mick Galwey (Shannon)
- John Hayes (Shannon)
- Bernard Jackman (Clontarf)
- Paddy Johns (Saracens)
- Malcolm O'Kelly (London Irish)
- Dion O'Cuinneagain (Sale Sharks)
- David Wallace (Garryowen)
- Paul Wallace (Saracens)
- Andy Ward (Ballynahinch RFC)
- Keith Wood (NEC Harlequins)
