= 1991 Ireland rugby union tour of Namibia =

Summary
P	W	D	L
Total
4	2	0	2
Test match
2	0	0	2
Opponent
P	W	D	L
Namibia
2	0	0	2

Tour chronology
- ← North America 1989 New Zealand 1992 →

The 1991 Ireland rugby union tour of Namibia. The Ireland national rugby union team made their first and, to date, only visit to Namibia in 1991. Richard Wallace made his full international debut in the first test game. Ireland played four matches, winning twice against Namibia B but losing both capped matches with the Namibia national rugby union team. The tour has been dubbed one of the most embarrassing episodes in Irish rugby history.

== Matches ==
Scores and results list Ireland's points tally first.

Opposing Team	For	Against	Date	Venue
Namibia B	45	16	July 17, 1991	S.W. Stadium, Windhoek
Namibia	6	15	July 20, 1991	S.W. Stadium, Windhoek
Namibia XV	35	4	July 23, 1991	Keetmanshoop
Namibia	15	26	July 27, 1991	S.W. Stadium, Windhoek

== Touring party ==
- Tour Manager: K.E. Reid
- Team Manager: Ciaran Fitzgerald
- Assistant Manager: John Moloney
- Fitness Adviser: Eddie O'Sullivan
- Captain: Phillip Matthews

=== Backs ===
- Fergus Aherne (Lansdowne)
- Nicky Barry (Garryowen)
- Jack Clarke (Dolphin)
- Keith Crossan (Instonians)
- Vince Cunningham (St. Mary's College)
- Simon Geoghegan (London Irish)
- Kenny Murphy (Cork Constitution)
- Brendan Mullin (Blackrock College)
- Rob Saunders (London Irish)
- Jim Staples (London Irish)
- Richard Wallace (Garryowen)

=== Forwards ===
- John Fitzgerald (Young Munster)
- Des Fitzgerald (Lansdowne)
- Neil Francis (Blackrock College)
- Mick Galwey (Shannon)
- Gary Halpin (Wanderers)
- Gordon Hamilton (North of Ireland FC)
- Terry Kingston (Dolphin)
- Donal Lenihan (Cork Constitution)
- Noel Mannion (Lansdowne)
- Phillip Matthews (Wanderers)
- Pat O'Hara (Sunday's Well)
- Nick Popplewell (Greystones)
- Brian Rigney (Greystones)
- Brian Robinson (Ballymena)
- Steve Smith (Ballymena)
