= 2000 Ireland rugby union tour of the Americas =

- Coach: Warren Gatland
- Tour captain: Keith Wood
- Top test point scorer: Ronan O'Gara (25)
- Top test try scorer: Mike Mullins (3)
Summary
| P | W | D | L |
Total
| 3 | 1 | 1 | 1 |
Test match
| 3 | 1 | 1 | 1 |
Opponent
| P | W | D | L |
Argentina
| 1 | 0 | 0 | 1 |
United States
| 1 | 1 | 0 | 0 |
Canada
| 1 | 0 | 1 | 0 |

Tour chronology
- ← Australia 1999 New Zealand 2002 →

2000 Ireland rugby union tour of the Americas. The 2000 Ireland national rugby union team summer tour saw them play three Test matches against Argentina, the United States and Canada. The touring party included two sets of brothers – Simon and Guy Easterby and David and Paul Wallace. The second Test against the United States remains Ireland's biggest win to date. It also saw Ireland score their most points (83) and their most tries (13) in a single match. In the same game Mike Mullins scored a hat-trick of tries. The tour saw several Ireland players making their senior debuts. David Wallace and Peter McKenna both featured against Argentina. However, while Wallace would on go to become an established international and a British Lion, it proved to be the first and last senior cap for McKenna. Geordan Murphy, Guy Easterby, Tyrone Howe and Frankie Sheahan all made their senior Ireland debuts against the United States. Murphy and Easterby celebrated the occasion by scoring two tries each.

== Touring party ==
- Manager: Warren Gatland
- Assistant Manager: Eddie O'Sullivan
- Captain: Keith Wood

=== Backs ===
- Dominic Crotty (Garryowen)
- Justin Bishop (London Irish)
- Girvan Dempsey (Terenure College)
- Guy Easterby (Ebbw Vale)
- Denis Hickie (St. Mary's College)
- Shane Horgan (Lansdowne)
- Tyrone Howe (Dungannon)
- Rob Henderson (London Wasps)
- David Humphreys (Dungannon)
- Kevin Maggs (Bath)
- Peter McKenna (St. Mary's College)
- Mike Mullins (Young Munster)
- Geordan Murphy (Leicester Tigers)
- Brian O'Driscoll (Blackrock College)
- Ronan O'Gara (Cork Constitution)
- Peter Stringer (Shannon)
- James Topping (Ballymena)

=== Forwards ===
- Bob Casey (Blackrock College)
- Peter Clohessy (Young Munster)
- Jeremy Davidson (Castres Olympique)
- Simon Easterby (Llanelli Scarlets)
- Justin Fitzpatrick (Dungannon)
- Anthony Foley (Shannon)
- Mick Galwey (Shannon)
- John Hayes (Shannon)
- Marcus Horan (Shannon)
- Eric Miller (Terenure College)
- Malcolm O'Kelly (St. Mary's College)
- Frankie Sheahan (Cork Constitution)
- David Wallace (Garryowen)
- Paul Wallace (Saracens)
- Andy Ward (Ballynahinch)
- Keith Wood (Garryowen)

== Match details ==
Complete list of matches played by Ireland in the Americas:

=== Argentina ===
3 June 2000

| Argentina | 34–23 | Ireland |
| Tries: Ignacio Corleto; Martín Scelzo; Con: Quesada (2); Pen: Quesada (5) | Report | Tries: Malcolm O'Kelly; Justin Bishop; Rob Henderson; Con: David Humphreys; Pen: David Humphreys (2) |

Ferro Carril Oeste, Buenos Aires
Referee: Andre Watson (South Africa)

| Argentina | Ireland |

Argentina: Ignacio Corleto; Octavio Bartolucci, Eduardo Simone (Felipe Contepomi), Juan Fernández Miranda, Diego Albanese; Gonzalo Quesada, Agustín Pichot (capt); Gonzalo Longo, Rolando Martín, Santiago Phelan, Ignacio Fernández Lobbe, Alejandro Allub, Martín Scelzo, Federico Méndez, Mauricio Reggiardo. Coach: Marcelo Loffreda
Ireland: P. McKenna (36' M. Mullins); S. Horgan, R. Henderson, K. Maggs, J. Bishop; D. Humphreys, (R. O'Gara), P. Stringer; A. Foley (A. Ward), D. Wallace, S. Easterby; M. O'Kelly, M. Galwey; J. Hayes, K. Wood (capt), P. Clohessy. Coach: W. Gatland

=== United States ===
10 June 2000

| United States | 3–83 | Ireland |
| Pen: Wells | Report | Tries: Mike Mullins (3); Geordan Murphy (2); Guy Easterby (2); Simon Easterby (2); Malcolm O'Kelly; Paul Wallace; David Humphreys; James Topping; Con: O'Gara (8) David Humphreys |

Singer Family Park, Manchester, New Hampshire
Attendance: 5,200
Referee: Clayton Thomas (Wales)

=== Canada ===
17 June 2000

| Canada | 27–27 | Ireland |
| Tries: Winston Stanley; Phil Murphy; Scott Stewart; Con: Scott Stewart (3); Pen: Scott Stewart (2) | Report | Tries: Shane Horgan; Justin Bishop; Paul Wallace; Pen: David Humphreys; Ronan O'Gara (3) |

Fletcher's Fields, Markham, Ontario
Referee: Joel Dume (France)

| Canada | Ireland |

Canada: W. Stanley; M. Irvine, N. Witkowski, K. Nichols, S. Fauth; S. Stewart, M. Williams; P. Murphy, R. Banks, G. Dixon; J. Tait, E. Knaggs; J. Thiel, P. Dunkley, R. Snow. Coach:
Ireland: D. Crotty; S. Horgan, M. Mullins, K. Maggs, J. Bishop; D. Humphreys, P. Stringer; A. Foley, A. Ward, S. Easterby; J. Davidson, M. Galwey; J. Hayes, K. Wood (capt), J. Fitzpatrick. Coach: W. Gatland
