= 1999 Ireland rugby union tour of Australia =

- Coach: Warren Gatland
- Tour captain: Dion O'Cuinnegain
- Top test point scorer: Nathan Spooner (19)
- Top test try scorer: Tiaan Strauss (3)
Summary
| P | W | D | L |
Total
| 4 | 1 | 0 | 3 |
Test match
| 2 | 0 | 0 | 2 |
Opponent
| P | W | D | L |
Australia
| 2 | 0 | 0 | 2 |

Tour chronology
- ← South Africa 1998 Americas 2000 →

1999 Ireland rugby union tour of Australia. The Ireland national rugby union team embarked on their third tour of Australia having also visited in 1979 and 1994. The tour saw Brian O'Driscoll make his full international in the first test against Australia. In 2001, O'Driscoll, together with Jeremy Davidson and Malcolm O'Kelly would return to Australia with the British and Irish Lions.

== Non-International Games ==
Scores and results list Ireland's points tally first.

| Opposing Team | For | Against | Date | Venue |
|---|---|---|---|---|
| New South Wales Country XV | 43 | 6 | 31 May 1999 | Woy Woy, Gosford |
| New South Wales | 24 | 39 | 6 June 1999 | Sydney Football Stadium, Sydney |

== Test matches ==
12 June 1999

| Australia | 46–10 | Ireland |
| Try: Herbert; Strauss (3); Tune; Wilson; Con: Spooner (5); Pen: Spooner (2) | Report | Try: Maggs; Con: Humphreys; Pen: Humphreys |

Ballymore Stadium, Brisbane
Attendance: 24,177
Referee: André Watson (South Africa)

19 June 1999

| Australia | 32–26 | Ireland |
| Try: Horan; Latham; Con: Roff (2); Pen: Roff (3); Spooner | Report | Try: Maggs; Clohessy; Bishop; Con: Humphreys; Pen: Humphreys (3) |

Subiaco Oval, Perth
Attendance: 26,267
Referee: André Watson (South Africa)

== Touring party ==
- Manager: Donal Lenihan
- Assistant manager: Phil Danaher
- Coach: Warren Gatland
- Captain: Dion O'Cuinnegain

=== Backs ===
- Jonny Bell (Dungannon)
- Justin Bishop (London Irish)
- Girvan Dempsey (Terenure College)
- Eric Elwood (Galwegians)
- David Humphreys (Dungannon)
- Kevin Maggs (Bath)
- Matt Mostyn (Beglea-Bordeaux)
- Mike Mullins (West Hartlepool)
- Brian O'Driscoll (UCD)
- Conor O'Shea (London Irish)
- Ciaran Scally (UCD)
- Jeremy Staunton (Garryowen)
- Tom Tierney (Garryowen)

=== Forwards ===
- Trevor Brennan (St. Mary's College)
- Bob Casey (Blackrock College)
- Peter Clohessy (Young Munster)
- David Corkery (Cork Constitution)
- Reggie Corrigan (Lansdowne)
- Victor Costello (St. Mary's College)
- Jeremy Davidson (Castres Olympique)
- Justin Fitzpatrick (Dungannon)
- Paddy Johns (Saracens)
- Ross Nesdale (Newcastle Falcons)
- Malcolm O'Kelly (London Irish)
- Dion O'Cuinnegain (Sale Sharks)
- Paul Wallace (Saracens)
- Andy Ward (Ballynahinch)
- Keith Wood (Harlequins)
