= Conan Doyle (rugby union) =

Irish rugby union player

Rugby union career
- Position: Centre
Senior career
| Years | Team | Apps | (Points) |
- Munster
| – | Garryowen | | |
National sevens team
| Years | Team | | Comps |
| 2009 | Ireland 7s | | |

Conan Doyle is an Irish rugby union footballer for Garryowen F.C. His usual position is inside centre, but he also plays out-half. He has made two appearances for Munster Rugby in the Celtic League, but was released by Munster at the end of the 2008/2009 season.

While at Munster he was selected for the Ireland national team for the 2009 Rugby World Cup Sevens. As of the 2011 season Doyle is the club captain of Garryowen.
