= Paul Hogan (rugby union) =

Irish rugby union player

- Full name: Paul John Hogan
- Born: 29 June 1968 (age 58) Limerick, Ireland

Rugby union career
- Position: Flanker
International career
Years	Team	Apps	(Points)
1992	Ireland	1	(0)

Paul John Hogan (born 29 June 1968) is an Irish former rugby union international.

Born in Limerick, Hogan was a back-rower who played for Garryowen and Munster. He gained one Ireland cap, as a flanker against France in Paris during the 1992 Five Nations Championship. In 1994, he captained Garryowen to the All-Ireland League title, then got recalled by Ireland for that year's tour of Australia, only to have his trip end early when he seriously injured his knee in a tour match against the ACT at Manuka Oval.

== See also ==
- List of Ireland national rugby union players
