= Hannah Clarke =

Hannah Clarke may refer to:

- Hannah Clarke, victim in the Clarke family murders
- Hannah Clarke (rugby union), Irish rugby union player
