= 1994 Ireland rugby union tour of Australia =

- Top test point scorer: Michael Lynagh (30)
- Top test try scorer: Ilie Tabua Tamanivalu(2)
Summary
P	W	D	L
Total
8	2	0	6
Test match
2	0	0	2
Opponent
P	W	D	L
Australia
2	0	0	2

Tour chronology
- ← New Zealand 1992 South Africa 1998 →

The Ireland national rugby union team toured of Australia in May and June 1994. It was their second tour of Australia, having previously visited in 1979. Both Jonny Bell and Keith Wood made their senior international debuts in the first test.

== Non-international games ==
Scores and results list Ireland's points tally first.

Opponent	For	Against	Date	Venue
Western Australia	64	8	18 May 1994	WACA Ground, Perth
New South Wales	18	55	22 May 1994	Concord Oval, Sydney
Australian Capital Territory	9	22	25 May 1994	Manuka Oval, Canberra
Queensland	26	29	29 May 1994	Ballymore, Brisbane
Australian XV	9	57	1 June 1994	Kruttschnitt Oval, Mount Isa
New South Wales Country	20	18	8 June 1994	Oakes Oval, Lismore

== Test matches ==
5 June 1994

Australia	33–13	Ireland
Try: Burke; Campese; Lynagh; Smith; Tabua; Con: Lynagh; Pen: Lynagh (2)	Report	Try: Johns; Con: Elwood; Pen: Elwood; O'Shea

Ballymore Stadium, Brisbane
Attendance: 26,545
Referee: Joël Dumé (France)

11 June 1994

Australia	32–18	Ireland
Try: Herbert; Tabua; Wilson; Con: Lynagh; Pen: Lynagh (5)	Report	Try: Clohessy; Francis; Con: O'Shea; Pen: O'Shea; Drop: O'Shea

Sydney Football Stadium, Sydney
Attendance: 37,239
Referee: Joël Dumé (France)

== Touring party ==
- Tour manager: F. Sowman
- Team manager: Gerry Murphy
- Assistant manager: L. Butler
- Technical adviser: Willie Anderson
- Captain: Michael Bradley

=== Backs ===
- Jonny Bell (Ballymena/Loughborough College)
- Michael Bradley (Cork Constitution)
- Phil Danaher (Garryowen)
- Eric Elwood (Lansdowne)
- Maurice Field (Malone)
- Simon Geoghegan (London Irish)
- Niall Hogan (Terenure College)
- Conor O'Shea (Lansdowne)
- Martin Ridge (Blackrock College)
- Alain Rolland (Blackrock College)
- Jim Staples (London Irish)
- Brian Walsh (Cork Constitution)
- Niall Woods (Blackrock College)

=== Forwards ===
- Shane Byrne (Blackrock College)
- Peter Clohessy (Young Munster)
- David Corkery (Cork Constitution)
- Victor Costello (St Mary's College)
- W. M. Cronin (Garryowen)
- Jeremy Davidson (Dungannon)
- John Fitzgerald (Young Munster)
- Neil Francis (Old Belvedere)
- Gabriel Fulcher (Cork Constitution)
- Mick Galwey (Shannon)
- Gary Halpin (London Irish)
- Paul Hogan (Garryowen)
- Paddy Johns (Dungannon)
- Terry Kingston (Dolphin)
- Denis McBride (Malone)
- Brian Robinson (Ballymena)
- Paul Soden (Cork Constitution)
- R. K. Wilson (Instonians)
- Keith Wood (Garryowen)
