= 2001–02 Powergen Cup =

Rugby union club competition in England

Tournament statistics

The 2001–02 Powergen Cup was the 31st edition of England's rugby union club competition. London Irish won the competition defeating Northampton Saints in the final. The event was sponsored by Powergen and the final was held at Twickenham Stadium.

== Draw and results ==
=== First round (Sep 15) ===
| Team one | Team two | Score |
|---|---|---|
| Bromsgrove | Darlington Mowden Park | 6-48 |
| Doncaster | Sandal | 41-8 |
| Dudley Kingswinford | West Hartlepool | 59-3 |
| Hull Ionians | Westoe | 13-12 |
| Morley | Liverpool St Helens | 23-28 |
| Morpeth | Bedford Athletic | 17-32 |
| New Brighton | Whitchurch | 35-21 |
| Nuneaton | Tynedale | 17-9 |
| Scunthorpe | Winnington Park | 20-18 |
| Walsall | Blaydon | 17-21 |
| Barking | Old Patesians | 26-16 |
| Barnstaple | Launceston | 7-35 |
| Blackheath | Haywards Heath | 26-11 |
| Kettering | Lydney | 16-29 |
| Marlow | Clifton | 24-14 |
| Norwich | Redruth | 22-13 |
| Penzance & Newlyn | Cinderford | 80-12 |
| Staines | North Walsham | 15-28 |
| Stroud | Camberley | 32-12 |
| Swanage & Wareham | Old Colleians | 10-32 |
| Tabard | London Nigerians | 23-38 |
| Westcombe Park | Reading | 16-18 |

=== Second round (Sep 29) ===
| Team one | Team two | Score |
|---|---|---|
| Bedford Athletic | Preston Grasshoppers | 16-44 |
| Blaydon | Fylde | 22-28 |
| Dudley Kingswinford | Nottingham | 36-3 |
| Kendal | Doncaster | 30-17 |
| Liverpool St Helens | Hull Ionians | 37-15 |
| New Brighton | Harrogate | 13-5 |
| Nuneaton | Wharfedale | 31-29 |
| Orrell | Scunthorpe | 83-8 |
| Sedgley Park | Stourbridge | 33-13 |
| Waterloo | Darlington Mowden Park | 20-32 |
| Barking | Old Colleians | 27-18 |
| Blackheath | Newbury | 18-37 aet |
| Launceston | Esher | 19-10 |
| London Nigerians | Marlow | 18-15 |
| Lydney | Reading | 21-10 |
| North Walsham | Penzance & Newlyn | 20-10 |
| Norwich | Stroud | 21-16 |
| Rosslyn Park | Plymouth | 15-6 |

=== Third round (Oct 13) ===
| Team one | Team two | Score |
|---|---|---|
| Bedford | Wakefield | 19-22 |
| Darlington Mowden Park | Dudley Kingswinford | 31-25 |
| Henley Hawks | Liverpool St Helens | 54-14 |
| Kendal | Manchester | 6-16 |
| Launceston | Exeter | 26-40 |
| London Nigerians | London Welsh | 8-43 |
| Lydney | Worcester | 0-45 |
| Moseley | North Walsham | 25-17 |
| Newbury | Barking | 36-23 |
| Norwich | Fylde | 20-32 |
| Nuneaton | New Brighton | 31-7 |
| Otley | Bracknell | 23-19 |
| Preston Grasshoppers | Birmingham & Solihull | 15-59 |
| Rosslyn Park | Orrell | 32-40 |
| Rotherham | Rugby | 48-3 |
| Sedgley Park | Coventry | 22-40 |

=== Fourth round (Nov 3) ===
| Team one | Team two | Score |
|---|---|---|
| Birmingham & Solihull | Wakefield | 35-6 |
| Darlington Mowden Park | Manchester | 27-39 |
| Exeter | London Welsh | 30-3 |
| Henley Hawks | Otley | 48-30 |
| Moseley | Worcester | 3-50 |
| Newbury | Nuneaton | 29-8 |
| Orrell | Fylde | 37-9 |
| Rotherham | Coventry | 51-27 |

=== Fifth round (Nov 26) ===
| Team one | Team two | Score |
|---|---|---|
| Birmingham & Solihull | Henley Hawks | 35-22 |
| Manchester | Exeter | 20-30 |
| Newbury | Orrell | 25-30 |
| Worcester | Rotherham | 19-26 |

=== Sixth round (Dec 15 & 16) ===
| Team one | Team two | Score |
|---|---|---|
| Bath | London Irish | 12-20 |
| Bristol Shoguns | Gloucester | 23-37 |
| Leicester Tigers | Exeter | 27-0 |
| Newcastle Falcons | London Wasps | 24-22 |
| Northampton Saints | Birmingham & Solihull | 32-19 |
| Orrell | Leeds Tykes | 22-31 |
| Sale Sharks | Harlequins | 25-32 |
| Saracens | Rotherham | 43-17 |

=== Quarter-finals (Jan 19) ===
| Team one | Team two | Score |
|---|---|---|
| Harlequins | Leicester Tigers | 22-20 |
| Leeds Tykes | Newcastle Falcons | 24-41 |
| London Irish | Gloucester | 25-10 |
| Saracens | Northampton Saints | 28-30 |

=== Semi-finals (Mar 9) ===
| Team one | Team two | Score |
|---|---|---|
| Northampton Saints | Newcastle Falcons | 38-7 |
| Harlequins | London Irish | 27-32 |

=== Final ===
20 April 2002

| London Irish | 38–7 | Northampton Saints |
| Try: Geoff Appleford 2 Justin Bishop 2 Michael Horak; Con: Barry Everitt 5 Pen: Barry Everitt | | Try: Ben Cohen; Con: Paul Grayson |

Twickenham Stadium, London
Attendance: 75,000
Referee: Steve Lander (Liverpool)

London
Northampton

| 15 | (England) Michael Horak |
| 14 | (England) Paul Sackey |
| 13 | (England) Geoff Appleford |
| 12 | (South Africa) Brendan Venter (player/coach) |
| 11 | (Ireland) Justin Bishop |
| 10 | (Ireland) Barry Everitt |
| 9 | (South Africa) Hentie Martens |
| 8 | (England) Chris Sheasby |
| 7 | (England) Declan Danaher |
| 6 | (Ireland) Eddie Halvey |
| 5 | (Wales) Steve Williams |
| 4 | (South Africa) Ryan Strudwick (c) |
| 3 | (England) Rob Hardwick |
| 2 | (South Africa) Naka Drotské |
| 1 | (England) Mike Worsley |
Replacements:
| 16 | (New Zealand) Richard Kirke |
| 17 | (New Zealand) Simon Halford |
| 18 | (New Zealand) Glenn Delaney |
| 19 | (England) James Cockle |
| 20 | (Wales) Darren Edwards |
| 21 | (England) James Brown |
| 22 | (England) Rob Hoadley |
Coach:
(South Africa) Brendan Venter

| 15 | (England) Nick Beal |
| 14 | (Scotland) Craig Moir |
| 13 | (Australia) Peter Jorgensen |
| 12 | (Scotland) John Leslie |
| 11 | (England) Ben Cohen |
| 10 | (England) Paul Grayson |
| 9 | (England) Matt Dawson |
| 8 | (England) Grant Seeley |
| 7 | (Scotland) Budge Pountney (c) |
| 6 | (New Zealand) Andrew Blowers |
| 5 | (France) Olivier Brouzet |
| 4 | (South Africa) Johan Ackermann |
| 3 | (Scotland) Mattie Stewart |
| 2 | (England) Steve Thompson |
| 1 | (Scotland) Tom Smith |
Replacements:
| 16 | (England) Dan Richmond |
| 17 | (England) Robbie Morris |
| 18 | (England) Jon Phillips |
| 19 | (Scotland) Andrew Rennick |
| 20 | (England) Dominic Malone |
| 21 | (South Africa) Mark Tucker |
| 22 | (England) James Brooks |
Coach:
Wayne Smith
