= Neville Furlong =

Irish rugby union player and Gaelic footballer

- Born: July 18, 1968 Waterford, Ireland
- Died: September 26, 2017 (aged 49)
- University: University of Galway

Rugby union career
- Position: Wing
International career
Years	Team	Apps	(Points)
1992-1992	Ireland	2	(4)

Neville Furlong (10 July 1968 – 26 September 2017) was an Irish rugby union international player who played as a winger.

Furlong initially played Gaelic football, and was selected at minor and under-21 levels. He attended University College Galway, where he developed an interest in hurling and played for the university team as well as for Connacht. He was an Irish Army captain.

Furlong played for the Ireland team in 1992, winning 2 caps during the 1992 Ireland tour of New Zealand. He scored one try for Ireland in his second test match against New Zealand on 6 June 1992, which happened to be the last four-point try scored in international rugby as the sport changed its scoring system later in 1992.

Furlong died on 26 September 2017 following a long battle against cancer.
