= Mick Fitzgibbon =

Irish rugby union player

- Full name: Michael Joseph Fitzgibbon
- Born: 2 April 1965 (age 61) Askeaton, County Limerick, Ireland
- School: Rockwell College
- University: Trinity College Dublin

Rugby union career
- Position: Flanker
International career
Years	Team	Apps	(Points)
1992	Ireland	6	(0)

Michael Joseph Fitzgibbon (born 2 April 1965) is an Irish former rugby union international.

Fitzgibbon, who attended Rockwell College, is a native of County Limerick, but played his provincial rugby for Connacht. A flanker, he captained Trinity College in the late 1980s and won All-Ireland trophies with his club Shannon during the 1990s.

Capped six times for Ireland, Fitzgibbon appeared in all four matches of the 1992 Five Nations Championship and both Tests against the All Blacks on that year's tour of New Zealand. Described as "one of Ireland's [..] best 'pound-for-pound' tacklers", he performed well in Ireland's narrow loss to the New Zealanders at Carisbrook. All six of his Ireland caps ended in defeat.

Fitzgibbon was also a Gaelic footballer who played some senior games for Limerick. On his return from the 1992 New Zealand tour, he featured in Ballysteen GAA's West Limerick Junior "A" title win.

== See also ==
- List of Ireland national rugby union players
