= 1992 Five Nations Championship =

Rugby tournament

- Date: 18 January - 21 March 1992
- Countries: England; Ireland; France; Scotland; Wales

Tournament statistics
- Champions: England (20th title)
- Grand Slam: England (10th title)
- Triple Crown: England (17th title)
- Matches played: 10
- Tries scored: 36 (3.6 per match)
- Top point scorer: (England) Jon Webb (67 points)
- Top try scorers: (England) Dewi Morris (England) Rory Underwood (England) Jon Webb (France) Alain Penaud (France) Sébastien Viars (3 tries)

The 1992 Five Nations Championship was the 63rd series of the Five Nations Championship, an annual rugby union competition between the major Northern Hemisphere rugby union national teams. The tournament consisted of ten matches held between 18 January and 21 March 1992.

The tournament was the 63rd in its then format as the Five Nations. Including the competition's former incarnation as the Home Nations Championship, the 1991 Five Nations Championship was the 98th Northern Hemisphere rugby union championship.

The championship was contested by England, France, Ireland, Scotland and Wales. England won the tournament, achieving the Grand Slam for the second tournament in a row, their tenth overall in the Five Nations. This was also their 20th outright victory, including five victories in the Home Nations, excluding ten titles shared with other countries. England also won the Triple Crown and Calcutta Cup as a result of their victories over the other Home Nations, in the process setting a new record for most tries scored in the Championship (15) while conceding only four. France, Scotland and Wales placed second, third and fourth respectively with two wins each, while Ireland came last with no victories.

== Participants ==
Nation	Venue	City	Head coach	Captain
England	Twickenham Stadium	London	Geoff Cooke	Will Carling
France	Parc des Princes	Paris	Pierre Berbizier	Philippe Sella
Ireland	Lansdowne Road	Dublin	Ciaran Fitzgerald	Phillip Matthews/Phil Danaher
Scotland	Murrayfield Stadium	Edinburgh	Jim Telfer	David Sole
Wales	National Stadium	Cardiff	Alan Davies	Ieuan Evans

== Table ==
Pos	Team	Pld	W	D	L	PF	PA	PD	Pts
1	England	4	4	0	0	118	29	+89	8
2	France	4	2	0	2	75	62	+13	4
3	Scotland	4	2	0	2	47	56	−9	4
4	Wales	4	2	0	2	40	63	−23	4
5	Ireland	4	0	0	4	46	116	−70	0

== Results ==
18 January 1992
15:05

Ireland	15–16	Wales
Try: Wallace; Con: Keyes; Pen: Keyes (3)		Try: S. Davies; Pen: N. Jenkins (3); Drop: Stephens

Lansdowne Road, Dublin
Referee: F. A. Howard (England)

18 January 1992
15:05

Scotland	7–25	England
Try: White; Pen: G. Hastings		Try: Morris; R. Underwood; Con: Webb; Pen: Webb (4); Drop: Guscott

Murrayfield Stadium, Edinburgh
Referee: W. D. Bevan (Wales)

1 February 1992
15:05

England	38–9	Ireland
Try: Guscott; Halliday; Morris; R. Underwood; Webb (2); Con: Webb(4); Pen: Webb (2)		Try: Keyes; Con: Keyes; Pen: Keyes

Twickenham Stadium, London
Referee: W. D. Bevan (Wales)

1 February 1992
15:05

Wales	9–12	France
Pen: N. Jenkins (3)		Try: Saint-André; Con: Lafond; Pen: Viars; Drop: Penaud

National Stadium, Cardiff
Attendance: 60,000
Referee: O. E. Doyle (Ireland)

15 February 1992
15:05

France	13–31	England
Try: Penaud; Viars; Con: Viars; Pen: Viars		Try: Morris; R. Underwood; Webb; Penalty try Con: Webb (3); Pen: Webb (3)

Parc des Princes, Paris
Attendance: 45,150
Referee: S. R. Hilditch (Ireland)

15 February 1992
15:05

Ireland	10–18	Scotland
Try: Wallace; Pen: Keyes (2)		Try: Nicol; Stanger; Con: G. Hastings (2); Pen: G. Hastings (2)

Lansdowne Road, Dublin
Referee: A. J. Spreadbury (England)

7 March 1992
15:05

England	24–0	Wales
Try: Carling; Dooley; Skinner; Con: Webb (3); Pen: Webb (2)

Twickenham Stadium, London
Referee: R. J. Megson (Scotland)

7 March 1992
15:05

Scotland	10–6	France
Try: Edwards; Pen: G. Hastings (2)		Pen: Lafond (2)

Murrayfield Stadium, Edinburgh
Attendance: 54,000
Referee: F. Burger (South Africa)

21 March 1992
15:05

France	44–12	Ireland
Try: Cabannes; Cécillon; Penaud (2); Sadourny; Viars (2); Con: Viars (5); Pen: Viars (2)		Pen: McAleese (4)

Parc des Princes, Paris
Attendance: 49,317
Referee: F. Burger (South Africa)

21 March 1992
15:05

Wales	15–12	Scotland
Try: Webster; Con: N. Jenkins; Pen: N. Jenkins (3)		Pen: Chalmers (2); G. Hastings; Drop: G. Hastings

National Stadium, Cardiff
Referee: M. Desclaux (France)
