= Danaher Sheehan =

Irish rugby union player

- Full name: Michael Danaher Sheehan
- Born: Limerick, Ireland
- Died: 3 November 1974

Rugby union career
- Position: Scrum-half
International career
Years	Team	Apps	(Points)
1932	Ireland	1	(0)

Michael Danaher Sheehan was an Irish international rugby union player. Sheehan, who was from Hyde Road in Limerick and was a railway worker, used his mother's maiden name "Danaher" as his given name.

A scrum-half, Sheehan was a nippy player and appeared in the Young Munster team which won the 1927-28 Bateman Cup title. His solitary Ireland cap came against England at Lansdowne Road in the 1932 Home Nations. He could also play soccer and appeared for Limerick F.C. in the 1937–38 League of Ireland season.

== See also ==
- List of Ireland national rugby union players
