= Richard Kirke =

- Full name: Richard Paul Charles Kirke
- Born: 16 April 1971 (age 55) Hamilton, New Zealand
- Height: 6 ft 0 in (183 cm)
- Weight: 232 lb (105 kg)

Rugby union career
- Position: Hooker
Senior career
| Years | Team | Apps | (Points) |
| 1997–98 | Bedford Blues | | |
| 1998–03 | London Irish | | |
Provincial / State sides
| Years | Team | Apps | (Points) |
| 1993–96 | Waikato | 30 | (20) |
| 2003 | Auckland | 2 | (0) |
Super Rugby
| Years | Team | Apps | (Points) |
| 1996 | Crusaders | 3 | (0) |
International career
| Years | Team | Apps | (Points) |
| 1999 | England "A" | | |

Richard Paul Charles Kirke (born 16 April 1971) is a New Zealand former professional rugby union player.

Born in Hamilton, Kirke grew up in the town of Fairlie, a small settlement between Christchurch and Queenstown.

Kirke, a hooker, began playing for Waikato in 1993 as an understudy to Warren Gatland. After Gatland retired, Kirke had a season as Canterbury's first choice hooker in 1995 and the following year made three appearances with the Crusaders during the inaugural Super 12 season. He joined English club Bedford in 1997 and was part of their title-winning 1997–98 Premiership Two campaign, which earned them promotion to the top division. Due to the club's financial difficulties, Kirk left the following season and signed with London Irish, where he spend five years and won a Powergen Cup.

Qualifying through his Cornish mother, Kirke gained an England "A" call up in 1999, then made Clive Woodward's 26-man England training squad in 2000 from which they would select players for an international against Australia.

Kirke's time at London Irish ended in 2003 after he badly injured his shoulder in a collision with Trevor Leota. He linked up with his brother Matt at the Ponsonby club on his return to New Zealand and had a season with Auckland in 2003.
