= 2000 United States rugby union tour of Scotland and Wales =

Summary
P	W	D	L
Total
5	1	0	4
Test match
2	0	0	2
Opponent
P	W	D	L
Scotland
1	0	0	1
Wales
1	0	0	1

Tour chronology
- ← Australia and Great Britain 1999 Ireland and Italy 2004 →

The 2000 United States rugby union tour was a series of matches played in November 2000 in Wales and Scotland by United States national rugby union team.

== Results ==
Scores and results list United States's points tally first.

Opposing Team	For	Against	Date	Venue	Status	Attendance	Ref.
Scotland	6	53	November 4, 2000	Murrayfield, Edinburgh	Test Match	35,638	
Scotland Devel. XV	17	49	November 8, 2000	Aberdeen	Tour match		
Cross Keys	22	7	November 11, 2000	Crosskeys	Tour match		
Wales Develop. XV	20	46	November 14, 2000	Neath	Tour match		
Wales	11	42	November 18, 2000	Millennium, Cardiff	Test Match	33,000	

== Test matches ==
Saturday 4 November 2000
18:45 GMT

Scotland	53–6	United States
Try: Leslie (2); Paterson; Pountney; Townsend (2); Con: Townsend (4); Pen: Townsend (5)	Report	Pen: Wells (2)

Murrayfield Stadium, Edinburgh
Attendance: 35,638
Referee: Pablo Deluca (Argentina)

Saturday 18 November 2000

Wales	42–11	United States
Try: James (2); Taylor; Thomas; Williams; Jenkins; Con: Thomas (2); Jenkins; Pen: Thomas (2)	Report	Try: Delai; Pen: Wells (2)

Millennium Stadium
Attendance: 33,000
Referee: Ian Ramage (Scotland)
