= Ter Casey =

Irish rugby union player

- Full name: James Christopher Casey
- Born: July 1902 Limerick, Ireland
- Died: 4 August 1992 (aged 90) Limerick, Ireland

Rugby union career
- Position: Hooker
International career
Years	Team	Apps	(Points)
1930–32	Ireland	2	(0)

James Christopher "Ter" Casey (July 1902 — 4 August 1992) was an Irish international rugby union player.

A native of Limerick, Casey was a member of the Young Munster team which won the Bateman Cup for the first time in 1928, then during the early 1930s gained two Ireland caps playing as a hooker.

Casey is a relation of Ireland scrum-half Craig Casey.

== See also ==
- List of Ireland national rugby union players
