= Derek McAleese =

Rugby union player from Northern Ireland

- Full name: Derek Raymond McAleese
- Born: 14 September 1964 (age 62) Limavady, Northern Ireland

Rugby union career
- Position: Fly-half
International career
Years	Team	Apps	(Points)
1992	Ireland	1	(12)

Derek Raymond McAleese (born 14 September 1964) is an Irish former rugby union international.

McAleese, raised in the Northern Ireland town of Limavady, played his senior rugby for Ballymena and Ulster.

A fly-half, McAleese made his only international Test appearance in a 1992 Five Nations match against France at Parc des Princes, where he had the team's goal-kicking duties and scored all of Ireland's points, not missing any of his four attempts at goal, in what was a heavy loss. He took part in Ireland's 1992 tour of New Zealand which followed.

== See also ==
- List of Ireland national rugby union players
