= Ronald Carey (rugby union) =

Rugby union player from Northern Ireland

- Full name: Ronald William Carey
- Born: 6 August 1965 (age 61) Dungannon, Northern Ireland

Rugby union career
- Position: Wing
International career
Years	Team	Apps	(Points)
1992	Ireland	2	(0)

Ronald William Carey (born 6 August 1965) is a former Ireland rugby union international from Northern Ireland.

A winger, Carey played for home town club Dungannon and was a police officer with the Royal Ulster Constabulary.

Carey made his Ulster debut in 1991 and by 1992 was in the Ireland team for a tour of New Zealand, featuring in both Tests against the All Blacks. In the 1st Test at Carisbrook, Ireland were three points down with a minute remaining, when Carey intercepted a pass and may have scored the match winning try, only to be called back by the referee who deemed he had knocked on. He earned no further Ireland caps, with an ankle ligament injury early in 1993 not helping the cause.

== See also ==
- List of Ireland national rugby union players
