= Peter Russell (rugby union) =

Irish rugby union player (born 1962)

- Born: 22 February 1962 (age 64) Belfast, Northern Ireland

Rugby union career
- Position: Fly-half
International career
Years	Team	Apps	(Points)
1990–92	Ireland	4	(23)

Peter Russell (born 22 February 1962) is a former Ireland rugby union international from Northern Ireland.

Russell, born in Belfast, was a fly-half for Instonians and Ulster.

Capped four times for Ireland, Russell's debut against England at Twickenham in the 1990 Five Nations was in a bad defeat and he didn't get another opportunity until his recall for the 1992 tour of New Zealand. In the first Test at Carisbrook, he kicked three conversions and a penalty, as Ireland came close to upsetting the All Blacks.

Russell is now an IT executive.

== See also ==
- List of Ireland national rugby union players
