= 1899 Ireland rugby union tour of Canada =

Irish rugby union tour

Summary
P	W	D	L
Total
11	10	0	1

Tour chronology
- Chile & Argentina 1952 →

The 1899 Ireland rugby union tour of Canada occurred in October 1899, twenty four years after Ireland's first international. It was Ireland's first ever international tour. It was also the first overseas tour undertaken by any of the home countries as a single entity. Seventeen players were selected to make the journey to Canada but no caps were awarded. Three clubs – Dublin University, Lansdowne and North of Ireland FC – provided fifteen of these players. Many of those who went on the tour had not played, nor did they subsequently play, for Ireland. Many of those who were part of the 1899 Triple Crown side were not able to afford the time or cost of the trip. Ireland often had to field just fourteen players due to injuries. Among those to be injured was James Myles who broke his leg. Myles, who was later elected as an independent TD of East Donegal, had to remain in Canada until December. The rest of the touring party had returned home in November. Ireland won 10 of the 11 matches they played. Their only defeat came against a Halifax XV in the third game of the tour. They scored 150 points and conceded 51. The trip was financed by Duke Collins, an Irish Canadian who originally came from County Dublin but had settled in Toronto.

== Matches ==
Scores and results list Ireland's points tally first.

Opposing Team	For	Against	Date	Venue	Status
United Services	10	0	12 October 1899	Wanderers Grounds, Halifax	Tour Match
Wanderers	16	3	14 October 1899	Wanderers Grounds, Halifax	Tour Match
Halifax	0	5	16 October 1899	Wanderers Grounds, Halifax	Tour Match
Montreal	20	12	19 October 1899	MAA Ground, Montreal	Tour Match
Quebec City	8	0	24 October 1899	Quebec City	Tour Match
Ottawa	9	3	28 October 1899	Metropolitan Ground, Ottawa	Tour Match
Brookville	28	0	30 October 1899	Brookville	Tour Match
Peterborough	16	3	2 November 1899	Nicholls Park, Peterborough	Tour Match
Hamilton	8	0	3 November 1899	Hamilton	Tour Match
Argonauts	23	19	4 November 1899	Varsity Stadium, Toronto	Tour Match
University of Toronto	12	6	6 November 1899	Varsity Stadium, Toronto	Tour Match

== Touring party ==
- Manager:
- Secretary:
- Referee:
- Captain: James G. Franks

=== Squad ===
- James Franks (Dublin University)
- Cecil Boyd (Dublin University)
- R.R. Boyd (Lansdowne)
- J. Byers (North of Ireland)
- Ian Davidson (North of Ireland)
- F. Dinsmore (North of Ireland)
- Bertie Doran (Lansdowne)
- I. Grove-White (Dublin University)
- Thomas Harvey (Dublin University)
- J.C. Lepper (North of Ireland)
- H.A. Macready (Dublin University)
- James Myles (City of Derry)
- Percy Nicholson (Dublin University)
- B.W. Rowan (Lansdowne)
- A.C. Rowan (Lansdowne)
- H. Stevenson (Dungannon)
- J. Stokes (Lansdowne)

== See also ==
- Ireland national rugby union team tours
