= Nicky Barry =

Irish rugby union player

- Full name: Nicholas Michael Peter Barry
- Born: 5 January 1969 (age 57) Limerick, Ireland

Rugby union career
- Position: Fly-half
International career
Years	Team	Apps	(Points)
1991	Ireland	1	(0)

Nicholas Michael Peter Barry (born 5 January 1969) is an Irish former rugby union international.

Born in Limerick, Barry was a highly rated schoolboy player who won a Munster Schools Rugby Senior Cup with Crescent College in 1986. He started his senior career with Garryowen.

Barry, usually a fly-half, toured France with Ireland as a 19 year old in 1988. He gained his only Irish cap in 1991, coming on as a substitute against Namibia in Windhoek.

At provincial level, Barry started out with Munster, then played for Leinster after he joined St Mary's College, before declaring for Connacht in 1996, having linked up with Clontarf.

== See also ==
- List of Ireland national rugby union players
