= Noel Murphy (rugby union, born 1937) =

Irish rugby union footballer and coach

- Born: Noel Arthur Augustine Murphy; February 22, 1937 (age 89) County Cork; Ireland
- Height: 1.84 m (6 ft 1/2 in)
- Weight: 92 kg (14 st 7 lb; 203 lb)
- Notable relative(s): Noel Murphy Sr (father); Kenny Murphy (son)

Rugby union career
- Position: Flanker
Senior career
Years	Team	Apps	(Points)
- Cork Constitution
- Garryowen
1959-1967	Barbarians	9	(3)
Provincial / State sides
Years	Team	Apps	(Points)
- Munster
International career
Years	Team	Apps	(Points)
1958–1969	Ireland	41	(15)
1959-1966	British and Irish Lions	8	(3)

Noel Arthur Augustine Murphy (born 22 February 1937) is a former Irish rugby union player who represented Munster, Ireland, the British and Irish Lions and the Barbarians as a flanker. He also played club rugby for both Cork Constitution and Garryowen. Since retiring as a player, Murphy has remained involved in rugby union, both as a coach and administrator.

== Family ==
Murphy is a member of one Ireland's most renowned rugby families. Both his father, Noel Sr, and his son Kenny Murphy have also represented Ireland at rugby. They are the first, and to date, only family to have a father, son and grandson capped at senior level.

== Rugby international ==
=== Ireland ===
Between 1958 and 1969, Murphy won 41 caps for Ireland. He also scored 5 tries (15 points) and was Ireland captain on five occasions. He made his international debut on 18 January 1958 in a 9–6 win against Australia at Lansdowne Road. He then went on to play for Ireland in all four games during the 1958, 1959 and 1960 Five Nations Championships. He scored his first Ireland try against Wales on 12 March 1960 in a 10–9 defeat at Lansdowne. Murphy also played in all four games in the 1964, 1965, 1966, 1967 and 1969 Five Nations Championships and scored further tries against England in 1964, and against Scotland in 1965 and 1967.

Murphy captained Ireland for the first time on 21 January 1967 in a 15–8 win at Lansdowne against Australia and was subsequently captain during the 1967 Five Nations Championship. He scored his final Ireland try against England in a 17–15 win at Lansdowne on 8 February 1969. He then made his final appearance for Ireland on 8 March 1969 against Wales. His Ireland career ended in controversial circumstances when he was involved in a punch up with Welsh lock Brian Price

=== British and Irish Lions ===
Murphy also toured twice with the British and Irish Lions and was a member of their squad for both the 1959 and 1966 tours of Australia and New Zealand. He made his Lions debut on 30 May 1959 against New South Wales and marked the occasion with a try. He played in 18 games during the 1959 tour and a scored further four tries, one each against Canterbury and Bay of Plenty/Thames Valley and two against North Auckland. He made his Test debut for the Lions against Australia on 13 June 1959. During the same tour he also played in three further Tests against New Zealand. Murphy also played 17 games and scored 3 tries on the 1966 tour. Two of his tries came in the opening game against Western Australia on 7 May. He played in four Test games, two against Australia and two against New Zealand. He scored his third try of the tour in the second test against Australia on 4 June 1966.

== Coach and administrator ==
After retiring as a player, Murphy coached Cork Constitution, Munster and then Ireland between 1977 and 1980. He also coached the British and Irish Lions on their 1980 South Africa tour. He has also served as president of Cork Constitution, the Munster Branch and the IRFU. He is currently one of Ireland's representatives on the International Rugby Board and is on the organising committee of the Heineken Cup.

Preceded by Roly Meates	Irish national rugby coach 1977–1980	Succeeded by Tom Kiernan
