= Hannah Clarke (rugby union) =

Irish rugby union player (born 2005)

- Born: 28 June 2005 (age 21)
- Notable relative: Jack Clarke (father)

Rugby union career
- Position: Wing
Youth career
- Oughterard RFC
Provincial / State sides
Years	Team	Apps	(Points)
2024-	Connacht Rugby		
International career
Years	Team	Apps	(Points)
2024-	Ireland U20		
National sevens team
Years	Team		Comps
2024-	Ireland 7s		

Hannah Clarke (born 28 June 2005) is an Irish rugby union player.

== Early and personal life ==
She is the daughter of Irish rugby union international Jack Clarke who featured for Ireland at the 1991 Rugby World Cup. Her brother Ben also played rugby, and all three of them played for Oughterard RFC.

== Club career ==
She was named Connacht Rugby U18 Women's Club Players of the Year for the 2023–24 season. She also played for Clovers in the Celtic Challenge in December 2024.

== International career ==
In 2024, she played for Ireland U20. In August 2024, she was awarded a central contract by The Irish Rugby Football Union. She was named as a training panelist for the Ireland women's national rugby union team ahead of the 2024 WXV, held in Canada in the autumn of 2024.

She made her debut for Ireland Sevens at the Dubai Sevens in the 2024–25 SVNS series, her efforts including a try against Fiji.
