= Geoff Appleford =

England international rugby union footballer

- Born: Geoff Appleford; 26 September 1977 (age 49) Dundee, South Africa
- Height: 1.91 m (6.3 ft)
- Weight: 95 kg (14 st 13 lb)
- School: Maritzburg College

Rugby union career
- Position: Centre
Senior career
Years	Team	Apps	(Points)
- Natal Sharks
- Mpumalanga Pumas
2000 - 2005	London Irish	75	(45)
2005 - 2007	Northampton Saints		
International career
Years	Team	Apps	(Points)
2002	England	1	(0)
National sevens team
Years	Team		Comps
- England

Geoff Appleford (born 26 September 1977 in Dundee, South Africa) is a retired rugby union footballer who played for London Irish at centre, then ended his career with Northampton Saints, although because of injury he never played a competitive game for the club. Geoff also played for England. He was educated at Maritzburg College.

A former Natal Shark and Mpumalanga Puma, Appleford joined London Irish in 2000. He made his England Sevens debut in 2001 and won his full England cap in 2002; qualifying through his grandparents. He was a member of London Irish's Powergen Cup winning team of 2002, starting in the final and scoring two tries.

In the summer of 2005 Appleford joined Northampton Saints.

In January 2007 Appleford was forced to take early retirement after failing to recover fully from a shoulder injury.

Also, Appleford is possibly the only player to be signed whilst injured and retire having not played a game for them.
