= Conor O'Shea =

Irish rugby union coach and player

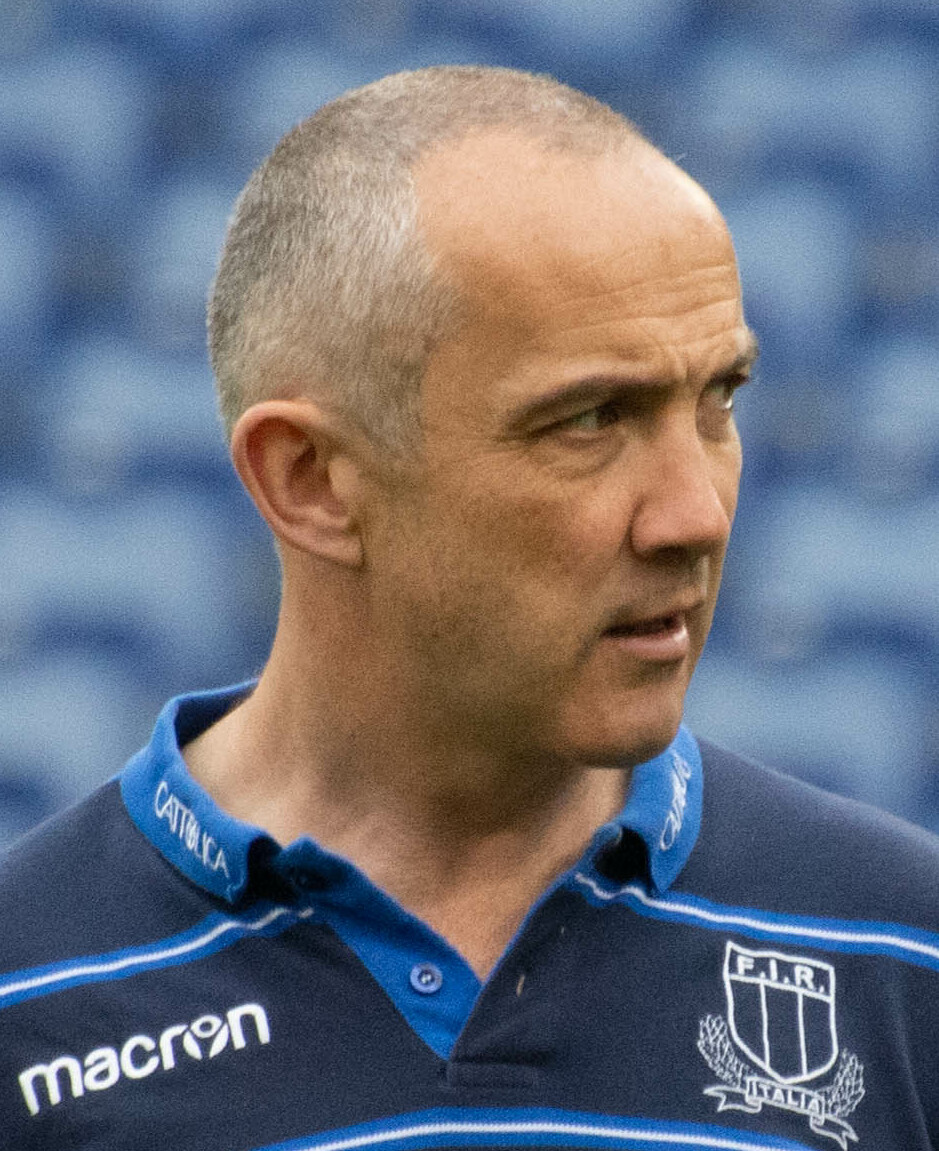
- Born: Conor Michael Patrick O'Shea; 21 October 1970 (age 56) Limerick, Ireland
- Height: 1.88 m (6 ft 2 in)
- Weight: 100 kg (16 st; 220 lb)
- School: Terenure College
- University: University College Dublin; Dublin Institute of Technology; United States Sports Academy

Rugby union career
- Position: Fullback
Amateur team(s)
| Years | Team | Apps | (Points) |
| 1992–1995 | Lansdowne | | |
Senior career
| Years | Team | Apps | (Points) |
| 1993–1996 | Leinster | | |
| 1995–2000 | London Irish | 127 | (412) |
International career
| Years | Team | Apps | (Points) |
| 1993–2000 | Ireland | 35 | (44) |
Coaching career
- Years: Team
- 2001–2005: London Irish
- 2010–2016: Harlequins
- 2016–2019: Italy

Conor O'Shea (Irish: Conchúir Ó Sé) (born 21 October 1970) is an Irish rugby union coach and former player. He was the head coach of the Italy national team from 2016 to 2019. He played as a full back and occasionally at out-half and centre for Ireland, Lansdowne and London Irish. He has also coached London Irish and Harlequins, and held management positions with the English Rugby Football Union and the English Institute of Sport.

== Early life and education ==
O'Shea was born in County Limerick. He went to Terenure College in Dublin, which is one of the main rugby nurseries in Ireland. He attended University College Dublin where he completed a Bachelor of Commerce Degree and began his representative career. O'Shea then completed a Diploma in Legal Studies at the Dublin Institute of Technology and a Master's of Sports Science degree in Sports Management in 1996 from the United States Sports Academy.

His father, Jerome, was a famous Gaelic football player in the 1950s and won All-Ireland Championship medals with Kerry in 1953, 1955 and 1959.

== Playing career ==
=== Club ===
O'Shea started his rugby playing career at Terenure College, where he won the Leinster Schools Rugby Senior Cup in 1991. He briefly represented his university UCD before leaving in 1992. Upon leaving, he joined Lansdowne, and soon became a regular starter at fullback in the 1st XV. He was selected for provincial side Leinster in 1993, where in 1994 he helped Leinster secure their first Irish Interprovincial Rugby Championship title since 1984, despite the title being shared. He scored Leinster's first ever try in a professional European tournament, scoring against Italian side Milan in the inaugural Heineken Cup. Leinster topped their pool with a win over Pontypridd, but failed to progress past the semi-finals where they were defeated by Cardiff 23–14.

In 1995, O'Shea moved to England so that he could play in a top division tournament, where he represented London Irish. He helped London Irish to promotion to the top division in England in his first season at the club, and helped his side to the semi-finals of the 1995–96 Pilkington Cup, losing to Leicester 46–21. In London Irish first season in the top flight division, they finished 10th, which meant they had to play in the Relegation/Promotion play–offs against Coventry - London Irish won on aggregate 42–23. In the inaugural European Challenge Cup, London Irish finished bottom of their pool, losing all 5 games. Though in the 1997–98 European Challenge Cup, Irish improved greatly to finish second in their group behind Stade Français. In 1998/99, London Irish recorded their best positioning on the English Premiership table finishing 7th on the overall table. In 1999 he was awarded the Zurich Players’ Player of the Season Award in a season where he captained the side to the top of their European Challenge Cup table, and the semi-finals of the Tetley's Bitter Cup. However, in both competition, London Irish were defeated by Northampton and Castres Olympique respectively.

In November 2000, O'Shea sustained an ankle injury playing against Gloucester, ending his playing career.

==== Honours ====
- Leinster Schools Rugby Senior Cup
  - Winner: 1991 (Terenure College)

=== International ===
On 13 November 1993, Conor O'Shea earned his first international cap, playing at fullback against Romania at Lansdowne Road in a 25–3 victory. He played in all of Ireland's 1994 Five Nations Championship matches, where he helped Ireland to their first win over England at Twickenham Stadium since 1982. He was later named in the squad that toured Australia in their 1994 tour. In 1995 he was selected for the 1995 Rugby World Cup in South Africa, where he played in two of Ireland's group matches (vs Japan and Wales) and started at fullback against France in the quarter-finals, losing 36–12. O'Shea wasn't selected in 1996 following his move to London Irish, but returned to the squad in 1997 ahead of the 1997 Five Nations Championship.

On 14 November 1998, O'Shea scored his first try for his country, scoring in Ireland's 70–0 victory over Georgia. In 1999, he was selected for the 1999 Rugby World Cup, which was part hosted by Ireland. He started in all 4 games of the World Cup, which saw Ireland get knocked out by Argentina in the quarter-final play-offs 28–24.

==== Honours ====
- Six Nations Championship
  - Third: 2000
- Millennium Trophy
  - Winners: 1994

== Coaching ==
=== London Irish ===
In 2001, O'Shea took up a coaching position with London Irish following his career ending injury. Initially helping out as a skills coach, before becoming director of rugby for the exiles. In his first season, he brought in South African Brendan Venter as a player-coach. He and Venter guided London Irish to fourth in the 2001–02 Aviva Premiership season but the team was knocked out in the quarter-finals by Northampton Saints 38–14. London Irish did however go on to win the first Anglo-Welsh Cup after winning the 2001–02 Powergen Cup, this time defeating Northampton Saints 38–7. With this win, he won the Zurich Rugby Director of the Season Award, jointly with Brendan Venter. In the 2002–03 season the Exiles dropped back down the table, finishing in 9th place, while also failing to progress out of the pool stages of their first Heineken Cup.

=== RFU ===
In 2005 O'Shea left London Irish to take up an appointment with the Rugby Football Union as Director of Regional Academies. His job was to oversee the network of 14 England regional academies and lead the selection and monitoring of players capable of developing into future England internationals. In 2008 he left his position with the RFU to take up a role with the English Institute of Sport as National Director, with a view on the 2012 Summer Olympics. In 2007 O'Shea was called upon by the RFU to give a talk to the England squad before playing Ireland for the first time at Croke Park to acquaint the players with the sporting and political history of the ground.

=== Harlequins ===
On 16 December 2009, Harlequins announced that O'Shea would become their new Director of Rugby replacing Dean Richards. He started his new position on 15 March 2010, midway through the 2009/10 season.

In his first full season in charge, he restored Harlequins to the Heineken Cup for the 2011–12 season following a 7th-place finish in the 2010–11 Aviva Premiership. He guided Quins to the semi-finals of the 2010–11 LV Cup and to the final of the 2010–11 European Challenge Cup, defeating Stade Français 19–18. In 2012, Quins topped the 2011–12 Aviva Premiership table at the end of the regular season with 75 points (17 wins, 1 draw, 4 losses). They defeated Northampton Saints 25–23 in the semi-finals to progress to the final against Leicester Tigers. On 26 May 2012, Harlequins won their first ever Premiership title defeating the Tigers 30–23. However, they were unable to defend their title after being knocked out by the Tigers 33–16 at the semi-finals of the 2012–13 Aviva Premiership. They did however clinch the 2012–13 LV Cup title and made it to the quarter-finals of the 2012–13 Heineken Cup.

During 2013–14 Heineken Cup, O'Shea led Quins to second in their pool, 9th overall dropping them down to the quarter-finals of the 2013–14 European Challenge Cup. After beating Stade Français 29–6, they failed to progress past the semi-finals after being defeated by Northampton Saints 10–18 in what was an all-England semi-finals. In the Premiership, Saracens beat Quins 31–17 in the semi-finals, while they also failed to get out of their group in the 2013–14 LV Cup. Harlequins dropped even further down the table during the 2014–15 Aviva Premiership, finishing 8th overall, which also meant they dropped out of the top flight European tournament. Quins did, however, make it all the way to the final of the 2015–16 European Rugby Challenge Cup, but were defeated by Montpellier 26–19, which was O'Shea's last match in charge of the team. On 20 January 2016, Harlequins announced that he would be leaving the club at the end of the season, after 6 years in the Director of Rugby role.

==== Honours ====
Harlequins

- English Premiership
  - Winners: 2012
- European Rugby Challenge Cup
  - Winners: 2011
  - Runners-up: 2016
- Anglo-Welsh Cup
  - Winners: 2013

London Irish

- Anglo-Welsh Cup
  - Winners: 2002

=== Head coach of Italy ===
On 25 March 2016, after months of speculation, O'Shea was named the new head coach of the Italian national team, bringing with him Englishman Mike Catt. O'Shea's first match in charge was during the 2016 June internationals, where Italy toured the Americas. The tour began with a closely fought defeat to Argentina 30–24, before going onto beat the United States, 24–20, and Canada, 20–18. During the 2016 end of year tests, having heavily lost to New Zealand 68–10, O'Shea on 19 November, helped Italy to their first-ever victory against South Africa winning 20–18. However, the following week saw Italy lose to Tonga for the first time since 1999, 19–17.

In O'Shea's first Six Nations Championship, Italy lost all five games and failed to pick up a single point for the table. Despite leading Wales 7–3 in the opening round, they conceded 30 points in the second half to lose 33–7. This was followed by a loss to Ireland 63–10 and a loss to England despite also leading England at Twickenham 10–5 at half time and still within a score to win at the 60th minute. A loss to France 40–18 meant it was guaranteed Italy would finish bottom. The last week saw Italy fail to score any points against Scotland, losing 29–0. During Italy's June tests, Italy failed to win a game, losing to Scotland 34–13 in Singapore, Fiji 22–19 with a last minute drop goal by Ben Volavola to seal the victory for Fiji, before going onto lose to Australia 40–27. However the score was 28–27 with less than five minutes to go in the game, but two quick tries by the Wallabies saw them comfortably win the game. The 2017 end-of-year tests saw Italy gain a single victory in three tests, defeating Fiji 19–10, but losing to Argentina 15–31 and South Africa 6–35.

The 2018 Six Nations Championship saw Italy gain their first table point since 2015, with a losers bonus point being earned in the final round when Italy lost to Scotland 29–27. The other matches, saw Italy not only fail to gain a victory, but were also denied a losers and try bonus point, losing 46–15 to England, 56–19 to Ireland, 34–17 to France and 38–14 to Wales. In June 2018, O'Shea took Italy on a two-test series against Japan. The series ended in a 1–1 draw, after losing the first test 34–17, but brought the series level in the second test with a 25–22 victory.

During the 2018/19 international season for Italy, they won just one in nine games; defeating Georgia 28–17 during the November test window. They lost all games during the 2019 Six Nations Championship, finishing bottom of the table for the fourth year in a row, three times under O'Shea. At the 2019 Rugby World Cup, Italy were eliminated in the pool stage, finishing in third place in Pool B behind New Zealand and South Africa; although this granted them automatic qualification for the 2023 Rugby World Cup, O'Shea resigned in November 2019, six months before the end of his contract with the Italian Rugby Federation, to take a position as the Rugby Football Union's (England) director of performance.

Sporting positions
| Preceded by (France) Jacques Brunel | Head coach of Italy national rugby union team 2016–2019 | Succeeded by (South Africa) Franco Smith |
