= Grant Charles Wells =

US international rugby union player

- Born: August 23, 1971 (age 55) Christchurch, New Zealand
- Height: 5 ft 8 in (1.73 m)
- Weight: 175 lb (79 kg)

Rugby union career
- Position: Fly-half
Senior career
Years	Team	Apps	(Points)
- SF Golden Gate
International career
Years	Team	Apps	(Points)
2000–2001	United States	12	(100)
- Correct as of August 31, 2020

Grant Charles Wells (born August 23, 1971) is a retired international rugby union player for the United States national team. He made 12 official appearances for the USA Eagles following his test match debut on May 27, 2000.

== Career ==
Wells was born in Christchurch, New Zealand. He made San Francisco his permanent home in the 1990s soon after joining the Golden Gate Rugby Club, which later merged to become San Francisco Golden Gate RFC.

Following his selection for the USA Eagles in 2000, he played as the starting fly-half in the Pacific Rim Rugby Championship and on the team's autumn tour of Scotland and Wales. In 2001, Wells played in the Pan American Championship before making his final test match appearance at home in San Francisco against England.

== Post-retirement ==
After his retirement from professional rugby, Wells became an assistant coach for the San Francisco Golden Gate team.

His children Jeremy, Ashley, Kayla, Benjamin, Haley
