= Dion O'Cuinneagain =

South African-Irish rugby union footballer and coach

- Born: 24 May 1972 (age 54) Cape Town, South Africa
- Height: 1.93 m (6 ft 4 in)
- Weight: 102 kg (225 lb; 16 st 1 lb)
- School: Rondebosch Boys' School
- University: Stellenbosch University

Rugby union career
- Position(s): Number 8, Flanker
Senior career
Years	Team	Apps	(Points)
1997–1999	Sale Sharks		
1999–2000	Ballymena RFC		
Provincial / State sides
Years	Team	Apps	(Points)
19xx-1997	Western Province		
1999–2000	Ulster		
2001	Munster		
International career
Years	Team	Apps	(Points)
1998–2000	Ireland A		((?)
1998–2000	Ireland	19	((5)
National sevens team
Years	Team		Comps
1995	South Africa		

Dion O'Cuinneagain (born 24 May 1972 in Cape Town, South Africa) is a former rugby union player who represented both South Africa and Ireland. Since retiring as a rugby player, O'Cuinneagain has worked as a doctor and as a rugby coach.

== Early years ==
O'Cuinneagain was born and raised in Cape Town. His father, Connell, was a dentist who came from County Dublin, Ireland. The O'Cuinneagain family originally came from Enniscorthy in County Wexford. His mother was an English nurse who came from Lancashire. O'Cuinneagain was educated at Rondebosch Boys' School before going on to study medicine at Stellenbosch University. As a youth he showed potential in several sports. He also represented Western Cape at schoolboy cricket and was a notable hurdler.

== Clubs and Provinces ==
O'Cuinneagain played rugby at various levels with University of Cape Town and then Western Province where his teammates included, among others, Tiaan Strauss, Corné Krige and Bobby Skinstad. However his career was initially hindered by a serious hip injury and in 1997 he left South Africa and moved to England where he joined Sale Sharks. Then in 1999 he switched to playing for Ballymena RFC and Ulster. He made five appearances for the latter in the Heineken Cup . Injuries continued to hinder O'Cuinneagain's career and in 1999 he suffered two shoulder injuries and a broken wrist. In 2000 he decided to return to South Africa to complete his medical studies. However, in 2001 he made a brief comeback when he agreed to help out an injury depleted Munster. On 13 April 2001 he played in a 24–22 win against a Rest of Ireland XV at Thomond Park before making a late appearance as a replacement against Stade Français in the Heineken Cup semi-final defeat on 22 April.

== Rugby international ==
=== South Africa ===
O'Cuinneagain captained South Africa at sevens level. He was a schoolboy international in 1989 and 1990 and in 1995 played for the sevens team at the Hong Kong Sevens.

=== Ireland ===
O'Cuinneagain first played for Ireland at A level and on 3 April 1998 played against England A in a 40–30 away defeat. Between 1998 and 2000 he made 19 full appearances and scored one try for the senior Ireland team. He made his senior international debut in a 37–13 defeat against South Africa on 13 June 1998. He played in all four games during the 1999 Five Nations Championship and then captained Ireland on both a tour of Australia and during the 1999 Rugby World Cup. He scored his one and only try for Ireland on 15 October 1999 in a World Cup game against Romania. He made his final appearance for Ireland in a 60–13 win against Italy at Lansdowne Road on 2 March 2000.

== Later career ==
After retiring as a rugby player, O'Cuinneagain returned to Cape Town to work as a doctor. He has since worked for several institutes, including the Sports Science Orthopaedic Clinic at the Sport Science Institute of South Africa. He has also worked as a general practitioner in Tokai, Cape Town. He remains actively involved in rugby and has coached and/or managed the South Africa Sevens and rugby teams at the University of Cape Town .
