= Noel Murphy (rugby union, born 1904) =

Irish rugby union player and coach

Noel Francis Murphy (27 December 1904 – 6 November 1987) was an Ireland rugby union international. His son Noel Jr and his grandson Kenny were also Ireland internationals. Murphy also played club rugby for Cork Constitution. Between 1930 and 1933 he won 11 caps playing as a flanker. Murphy made his international debut on 8 February 1930 in a 4–3 win against England at Lansdowne Road. He made his last appearance for Ireland on 11 February 1933, again against England, in a 17–6 defeat at Twickenham. Murphy coached the Ireland squad on their 1961 tour of South Africa when the touring party also included his son Noel Jr. He was born and died in County Cork, Ireland.
