= Phil Danaher (rugby union) =

Irish rugby union player

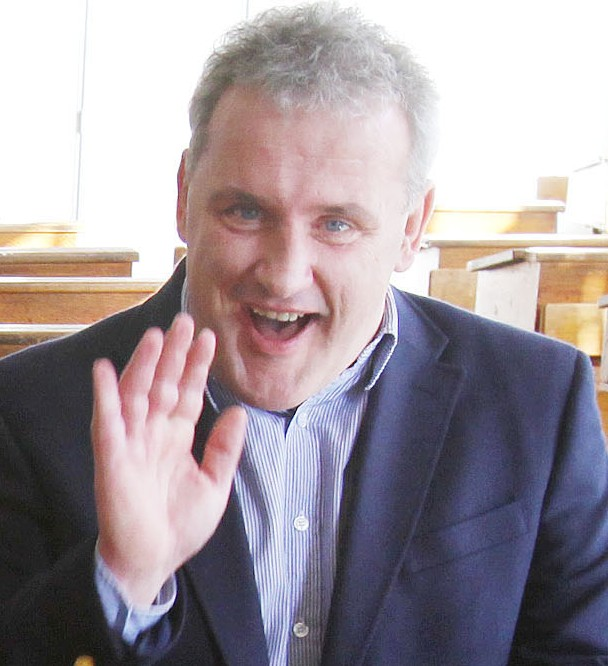
- Danaher in 2012
- Born: Philip Danaher; 5 October 1965 (age 61) Abbeyfeale
- School: St Munchin's College, Limerick

Rugby union career
- Position: Fullback/Centre
Senior career
Years	Team	Apps	(Points)
1987-1995	Munster		
International career
Years	Team	Apps	(Points)
1988-1995	Ireland	28	(6)

Philip Danaher (born 5 October 1965) is a retired Irish rugby union Fullback and Centre. He played for St Munchin's College, Garryowen (as captain), Lansdowne, Munster and won 28 caps between 1988 and 1995 for Ireland. He made his international debut against Scotland on 16 January 1988 and captained the team 3 times, including the 1992 Ireland rugby union tour of New Zealand. .

Danaher was a squad member in the Five Nations Championship from 1988 to 1990 and 1992 to 1995 and in tours to France 1988, North America 1989, New Zealand 1992 and Australia 1994. He was not a member of the squads for the 1991 or 1995 Rugby World Cups.

He retired in 1996 following a serious thumb injury. He was later assistant coach on tours to South Africa 1998 and Australia 1999.

Danaher also played Gaelic Football with Limerick GAA and Kerry GAA and badminton to national level.
