= Richard Costello (rugby union) =

Irish rugby union player

- Full name: Richard Anthony Costello
- Born: 8 March 1964 (age 62) Limerick, Ireland
- Height: 6 ft 7 in (201 cm)

Rugby union career
- Position: Lock
International career
Years	Team	Apps	(Points)
1993	Ireland	1	(0)

Richard Anthony Costello (born 8 March 1964) is an Irish former rugby union international.

Costello, born in Limerick, was a 6 ft 7 in lock who was capped once for Ireland, against Scotland at Murrayfield in the 1993 Five Nations Championship. He played his rugby for Garryowen and Munster.

A publican by profession, Costello and his family have been running The Locke Bar in Limerick since 1989.

Costello received a kidney from his wife Anna in 2013 following three years of declining health. In 2010, he had been told both his kidneys were failing and had been going through dialysis, before the successful kidney transplant operation.

== See also ==
- List of Ireland national rugby union players
