= Mick Sherry =

Irish rugby union player

- Full name: Michael James Alexander Sherry
- Born: 21 June 1951 (age 75) Foxford, Co. Mayo, Ireland
- Notable relative: Mike Sherry (son)

Rugby union career
- Position: Flanker
International career
Years	Team	Apps	(Points)
1975	Ireland	2	(0)

Michael James Alexander Sherry (born 21 June 1951) is an Irish former rugby union international.

Born in Foxford, County Mayo, Sherry was educated at Cistercian College, Roscrea.

A flanker, Sherry was capped twice for Ireland in the 1975 Five Nations Championship, for the team's final two fixtures, against France at Lansdowne Road and Wales at the National Stadium, Cardiff. He then dislocated his shoulder playing in the Leinster Cup with Lansdowne, which ruled him out of the remainder of the season.

Sherry, who is a solicitor by profession, is the father of Ireland and Munster hooker Mike Sherry.

== See also ==
- List of Ireland national rugby union players
