= Brian Rigney =

Ireland international rugby union player

- Born: Brian Joseph Rigney; 22 September 1963 Portlaoise, County Laois, Ireland
- Height: 6 ft 5 in (196 cm)
- Occupation(s): Food and Beverages Industry professional.

Rugby union career
- Position: Lock
International career
Years	Team	Apps	(Points)
1991-1992	Ireland	8	(0)

Brian Joseph Rigney (born 22 September 1963 in Portlaoise) is an Irish former rugby union player who won 8 caps for his country between 1991 and 1992. He had to retire because of injury.

He played club rugby for Greystones RFC. He played for Leinster between 1988 and 1996. He is now a food and beverages industry professional. His nickname is Riggers. His brother Colm played professional rugby for Connacht.
