= David Wallace (rugby union) =

Irish rugby union player (born 1976)

- Born: David Peter Wallace; 8 July 1976 (age 50) Limerick, Ireland
- Height: 1.88 m (6 ft 2 in)
- Weight: 105 kg (16.5 st; 231 lb)
- School: Crescent College
- Notable relatives: Richard Wallace (brother); Paul Wallace (brother)

Rugby union career
- Position: Flanker
Amateur team(s)
Years	Team	Apps	(Points)
- Garryowen
Senior career
Years	Team	Apps	(Points)
1997–2012	Munster	203	(205)
- Correct as of 9 April 2012
International career
Years	Team	Apps	(Points)
2000–2011	Ireland	72	(60)
2001, 2009	British & Irish Lions	3	(0)
- Correct as of 28 August 2011

David Peter Wallace (born 8 July 1976) is an Irish retired rugby union player, who played for Munster, Ireland and the British & Irish Lions. He normally played as an openside flanker, but could also play blindside flanker and number 8.

== Early life ==
Wallace grew up in Limerick on Ennis Road, and later lived in Cork. He was educated at Crescent College

== Munster ==
Wallace made his Munster debut against Connacht in August 1997. He made his European debut against Harlequins in September 1997 in the 1997–98 Heineken Cup.

Wallace started for Munster in the 2000 Heineken Cup Final. He scored his side's only try but opponents Northampton Saints eventually won 9–8. Wallace again started for Munster during the 2002 Heineken Cup Final against Leicester Tigers. Once again, Munster lost narrowly, being defeated 15–9.

Injury ruled Wallace out of much of the 2002–03 Celtic League, meaning he missed Munster's victory against Neath that won the league.

His first taste of silverware with Munster came against Scarlets in the Celtic Cup Final in May 2005.

Wallace scored the fourth try in Munster's win over Sale in the 2005–06 Heineken Cup to take the Irish province into a home quarter-final against USA Perpignan. After defeating Perpignan in the quarter final, Munster beat arch-rivals Leinster 30–6 in the semi-final to reach their third Heineken Cup final. At the Millennium Stadium, Munster beat Biarritz Olympique 23–19 to win the 2006 Heineken Cup Final. This was Munster's, and Wallace's, first Heineken Cup Final victory.

Munster, and Wallace, again secured Heineken Cup success when they beat Toulouse 16–13 in the 2008 Heineken Cup Final.

Wallace was part of the Munster team that won the 2008–09 Magners League.

In February 2011, Wallace extended his contract with Munster until the end of the 2011–12 season.

Wallace became the sixth player to reach 200 caps for Munster against Leinster during the 2011 Magners League Grand Final, a game in which he won the Man of the Match award.

Having returned to full training after the knee injury that ruled him out of the 2011 World Cup and 2012 Six Nations, Wallace was named in the Munster squad to travel to Aironi on 7 March 2012. He made his comeback during the game, playing the last 20 minutes. Wallace continued his comeback by playing the first 40 minutes of Munster A's friendly against a Munster Development team on 16 March. He was added to Munster's 2011–12 Heineken Cup squad in March 2012. Wallace made his first appearance in the 2011–12 Heineken Cup season in the quarter-final against Ulster on 8 April 2012. This turned out to be Wallace's last game for Munster, as a recurrence of the knee injury suffered in August 2011 forced him to retire in May 2012.

== Ireland ==
Wallace made his Ireland debut against Argentina on 3 June 2000.

On 10 June 2000, Wallace was part of the Ireland team that recorded their largest win by beating the United States 83–3.

Three lengthy injury-enforced absences hindered Wallace's international development. He only played in five games for Ireland until returning to start in the Triple Crown victory over Scotland in the 2004 Six Nations Championship — scoring a vital try in the process. He started again in both Tests in 2004 against South Africa. He did not return again to the Irish side until the second Test against Japan in June 2005, where he scored his fourth international try.

His form for Munster saw him earn a recall to the Irish set-up in 2006. He was present during the 2006 Six Nations Championship and the Summer Tour in June.

Wallace scored a try for Ireland in their 43–13 demolition of England in the 2007 Six Nations Championship, and his form saw him selected in Ireland's squad for the 2007 Rugby World Cup in France. He started all four of Ireland's pool games at the tournament.

Wallace was a member of the Irish Grand Slam winning side in 2009.

Wallace kept his place in the Ireland team for the November Tests in 2009, and played a crucial role in the win over South Africa. He played in all 5 of Ireland's 2010 Six Nations Championship games and won the Man-of-the-Match award against Italy. Wallace was in outstanding form for Munster throughout the 2009/10 season, and was selected in Ireland's squad for the summer tour to New Zealand and Australia. He played against New Zealand and came on as a substitute against the New Zealand Maori before returning home for the birth of his second child. He played against South Africa, New Zealand and Argentina during Ireland's 2010 Autumn Tests, and became Ireland's most capped back-row player. Wallace played in all five of Ireland's 2011 Six Nations Championship games, including the 24–8 victory over England at Aviva Stadium that ended England's hopes of a Grand Slam.

Wallace was selected in Ireland's training squad for the 2011 World Cup warm-ups in August, and was also selected in the final 30-man squad. However, a knee injury sustained during Ireland's final warm-up game against England ruled Wallace out of the tournament in New Zealand.

Following the injury, he was ruled out of action for six months, which also ruled Wallace out of the 2012 Six Nations Championship.

== British & Irish Lions ==
Wallace toured Australia with the 2001 British & Irish Lions following in the footsteps of his brothers Richard and Paul. He played against NSW Country Districts, and scored a try against ACT Brumbies.

On 21 April 2009, Wallace was named in the Lions' squad for the tour to South Africa. He started the first and second tests, and came on as a substitute for the third.

== Retirement ==
Wallace announced his retirement from rugby on 3 May 2012, due to the knee injury he suffered in August 2011. Wallace had made a comeback from the injury, but a re-occurrence of the injury forced him to quit the game.

Speaking at the announcement,

As a result of being injured, he retired from professional rugby after fifteen years of playing because he realized that there had been an increase in competitiveness in Munster and Ireland, as well as the sport’s popularity in general. After retiring from professional athletics, he entered the world of private business and concentrated on his family responsibilities.

Since his retirement from rugby, Wallace has opened a sweet shop in Limerick. In 2017 he joined Bank of Ireland as a Business Development Manager for the Munster region.

== Statistics ==
=== International tries ===
Try	Opposing team	Location	Venue	Competition	Date	Result
1	Wales	Dublin	Lansdowne Road	2003 RWC warm-up	16 August 2003	Won
2	Scotland	Edinburgh	Murrayfield Stadium	2003 RWC warm-up	6 September 2003	Won
3	Scotland	Dublin	Lansdowne Road	2004 Six Nations	27 March 2005	Won
4	Japan	Tokyo	Chichibunomiya Stadium	2005 Ireland Tour	19 June 2005	Won
5	Wales	Dublin	Lansdowne Road	2006 Six Nations	26 February 2006	Won
6	South Africa	Dublin	Lansdowne Road	2006 November Tests	11 November 2006	Won
7	England	Dublin	Croke Park	2007 Six Nations	24 February 2007	Won
8	France	Paris	Stade de France	2008 Six Nations	9 February 2008	Lost
9	Scotland	Dublin	Croke Park	2008 Six Nations	23 February 2008	Won
10	Canada	Limerick	Thomond Park	2008 November Tests	8 November 2008	Won
11	Italy	Rome	Stadio Flaminio	2009 Six Nations	15 February 2009	Won
12	France	Paris	Stade de France	2010 Six Nations	13 February 2010	Lost

=== International analysis by opposition ===
Against	Played	Won	Lost	Drawn	Tries	Points	% Won
Argentina	4	2	2	0	0	0	50
Australia	3	1	1	1	0	0	33.33
Canada	1	1	0	0	1	5	100
England	9	6	3	0	1	5	66.67
France	9	2	7	0	2	10	22.22
Georgia	1	1	0	0	0	0	100
Italy	8	8	0	0	1	5	100
Japan	1	1	0	0	1	5	100
Namibia	1	1	0	0	0	0	100
New Zealand	7	0	7	0	0	0	0
Romania	1	1	0	0	0	0	100
Samoa	1	1	0	0	0	0	100
Scotland	10	8	2	0	3	15	80
South Africa*	8	3	5	0	1	5	37.5
Tonga	1	1	0	0	0	0	100
United States	1	1	0	0	0	0	100
Wales	9	7	2	0	2	10	77.78
Total	75	45	29	1	12	60	60

Correct as of 5 July 2017 * indicates inclusion of caps for British & Irish Lions

== Honours ==
=== Munster ===
- European Rugby Champions Cup:
  - Winner (2): 2005–06, 2007–08
- United Rugby Championship:
  - Winner (3): 2002–03, 2008–09, 2010–11
- Celtic Cup:
  - Winner (1): 2004–05
- Irish Interprovincial Rugby Championship:
  - Winner (3): 1998–99, 1999–2000, 2000–01

=== Ireland ===
- Six Nations Championship:
  - Winner (1): 2009
- Grand Slam:
  - Winner (1): 2009
- Triple Crown:
  - Winner (4): 2004, 2006, 2007, 2009

=== British & Irish Lions ===
- British & Irish Lions tours:
  - Tourist (2): 2001, 2009
