= Fergus Aherne =

Ireland international rugby union player

- Born: Leslie Fergus Patrick Aherne; 16 March 1963 (age 63) County Cork, Ireland

Rugby union career
- Position: Scrum-half
International career
Years	Team	Apps	(Points)
1988-92	Ireland	16	(5)

Leslie Fergus Patrick Aherne (born 16 March 1963) in Cork is a former Irish rugby union international player who played as a scrum-half. He played for the Ireland team from 1988 to 1992, winning 16 caps and scoring one try. He was a member of the Ireland squad at the 1991 Rugby World Cup.
