= Kenny Murphy (rugby union) =

Irish rugby union player (born 1966)

Kenny Murphy (born 21 July 1966) is a former Irish rugby union international player who played as a full-back. He played for the Ireland team from 1990 to 1992, winning 11 caps. He was a member of the Ireland squad at the 1991 Rugby World Cup.

He played club rugby for Cork Constitution and provincial rugby for Munster. Both his father and grandfather, Noel Murphy Sr. and Noel Murphy Jr. also played internationally for Ireland.
