= Vince Cunningham =

Irish rugby union player

- Born: Vincent (Vinnie); March 14, 1967 (age 59) Dublin

Rugby union career
- Position: Centre
International career
Years	Team	Apps	(Points)
1988-1994	Ireland	16	(14)
National sevens team
Years	Team		Comps
1993	Ireland		

Vincent John Gerald Cunningham (born 14 March 1967, in Dublin) is a former Ireland international rugby union player. He played as a centre.

He had 16 caps for Ireland, from 1988 to 1994, scoring three tries and one conversion, 14 points in aggregate. The Irish centre played two matches at the 1991 Rugby World Cup finals. He played twice at the Five Nations, in 1993 and 1994.

He toured New Zealand in 1993 with the British and Irish Lions and at the time played club rugby for St. Mary's College R.F.C.
