= Jack Clarke (rugby union) =

Irish rugby union player

Jack Clarke (born Kisumu, 2 September 1968) is a former Irish rugby union international player who played as a winger. He played for Dolphin RFC and for Munster. He played for the Ireland team from 1991 to 1992, winning 6 caps and scoring one try. He was a member of the Ireland squad at the 1991 Rugby World Cup. He came out of retirement at the age of 50 years-old to play for Oughterard RFC, for whom his children Ben and Hannah also played.
