= Gabriel Fulcher =

Irish rugby union player

Gabriel Fulcher (born 27 November 1969) is a former Irish rugby union international player who played as a lock. He played for the Ireland team from 1994 to 1998, winning 20 caps. He was a member of the Ireland squad at the 1995 Rugby World Cup.
