= Noel Mannion =

Irish rugby union player

- Born: Noel Mannion; 12 January 1963 (age 63) Ballinasloe, Ireland

Rugby union career
- Position: Number 8
Amateur team(s)
| Years | Team | Apps | (Points) |
- Corinthians
Provincial / State sides
| Years | Team | Apps | (Points) |
- Connacht
International career
| Years | Team | Apps | (Points) |
| 1988-1993 | Ireland | 16 | (15) |

Noel Mannion (born 12 January 1963 in Ballinasloe, Ireland) is a former Irish rugby union international player who played for the Irish national rugby union team. He played as a number eight. He played for the Ireland team from 1988 to 1993, winning 16 caps and scoring 3 tries, after making his debut in October 1988 against Samoa in a 49–22 win at Lansdowne Road. He was part of the Ireland team at the 1991 Rugby World Cup.

In January 2024, Mannion was inducted into the Medtronic Galway Sports Stars Hall of Fame.
