= Rob Henderson =

British Lions & Ireland international rugby union player

- Born: Robert Alexander James Henderson; 27 October 1972 (age 54) Dover, England
- Height: 1.85 m (6 ft 1 in)
- Weight: 93 kg (14.6 st)
- School: Tiffin School

Rugby union career
- Position: Centre
Amateur team(s)
Years	Team	Apps	(Points)
- Young Munster
Senior career
Years	Team	Apps	(Points)
- London Irish
1997–2001	Wasps	52	(90)
1999	Leinster	1	(0)
2001–06	Munster	66	(70)
2006–07	Toulon	24	(30)
–	Esher		
International career
Years	Team	Apps	(Points)
1999–2003	Ireland	29	(30)
2001	British & Irish Lions	3	(0)

Robert Alexander James Henderson (born 27 October 1972) is an Irish former rugby union player. He played mostly as a centre, for clubs including London Irish, Wasps, Leinster, Munster, Toulon and Esher.

He represented Ireland internationally, winning 29 caps, and toured with the British & Irish Lions in 2001, winning three caps.

== Early life ==
Born in Dover, England, raised in a single-parent household by his Irish mother, and educated at the Tiffin School, Kingston upon Thames, Henderson's natural athletic ability and aggression were effectively harnessed by rugby coach Dave Morris.

== Playing career ==
Henderson played for London Irish, Wasps, Leinster and joined Munster in late 2001. Whilst at Wasps he helped them win the Anglo-Welsh Cup in 1999 and 2000; he was a replacement in the 1999 final but started in 2000.

Henderson joined the French side Toulon, then of Pro D2, in 2006 and played for one season, before returning to the UK to sign for Esher RFC.

In 2016 he joined Thames Ditton cricket club as a middle order batsman.

== International career ==
Henderson represented Ireland internationally, qualifying through his Wexford-born Mother. On an episode of Stick to Rugby Henderson said that Clive Woodward approached him about playing for England, but he declared his interest in playing for Ireland, and Woodward then accommodated this by contacting the IRFU.
