= Richard Wallace (rugby union) =

Irish rugby union player

- Born: Richard Michael Wallace; 16 January 1968 (age 58) Cork, Ireland
- Height: 5 ft 11 in (1.80 m)
- Weight: 14 st 0 lb (89 kg)
- Notable relative(s): Paul Wallace; David Wallace

Rugby union career
- Position: Wing
Senior career
| Years | Team | Apps | (Points) |
| 1995–97 | Munster | 11 | (20) |
| 1997–99 | Saracens | 25 | (55) |
International career
| Years | Team | Apps | (Points) |
| 1991–98 | Ireland | 29 | (23) |
| 1993 | Lions | 0 | (0) |

Richard Michael Wallace (born 16 January 1968) is a former Garryowen, Munster, Saracens, Ireland and Lions rugby union player. He was a winger and gained 29 caps with the Ireland national rugby union team. He was a member of the first Munster team to compete in the Heineken Cup. He made his full international debut in 1991 against Namibia. He is the all-time top try scorer for the Ireland national rugby sevens team in Rugby World Cup Sevens with 10 tries.

His younger brothers Paul Wallace and David Wallace also played rugby for Ireland. He later became an airline pilot for CityJet.
