= Kevin Maggs =

Ireland international rugby union player

- Born: Kevin Michael Maggs; 3 June 1974 (age 52) Bristol, England
- Height: 6 ft 0 in (1.83 m)
- Weight: 14 st 9 lb (93 kg)
- School: Lockleaze Comprehensive Bristol
- University: South Bristol College

Rugby union career
- Position: Centre
- Current team: Moseley
Senior career
Years	Team	Apps	(Points)
1993–1998	Bristol	95	(25)
1998–2004	Bath	152	(125)
2007–2009	Bristol	22	(130)
2009–2010	Rotherham	24	(25)
2010–2011	Moseley		
Provincial / State sides
Years	Team	Apps	(Points)
2004–2007	Ulster	41	(15)
International career
Years	Team	Apps	(Points)
1997–2005	Ireland	70	(75)
2001–2010	Barbarians	8	(5)

Kevin Michael Maggs (born 3 June 1974) is a former professional rugby union player who played as a centre. He is currently a scout for the IRFU Ireland national rugby union team. He previously played for Bristol, Bath, Ulster and Rotherham Titans. Started his adult rugby career in Bristol with local side Imperial RFC.

Maggs played for Ireland because Brian Ashton, who was Ireland coach at time, came to Bristol to watch flanker David Corkery and was told by Ralph Knibbs (Bristol's player–manager), that Maggs had a grandfather from Limerick. He was then called up to the Irish development tour to New Zealand in 1997. He made his international debut for Ireland against New Zealand at Lansdowne Road in November 1997 and played at the 1999 and 2003 Rugby World Cups.

== Honours ==
- 2005–06 Celtic League
