= Paul Wallace (rugby union) =

Irish rugby union player

- Born: Paul Stephen Wallace; 30 December 1971 (age 54) Cork, Ireland
- Height: 1.83 m (6 ft 0 in)
- Weight: 110 kg (17 st 5 lb; 240 lb)
- School: Crescent College
- University: University College Cork
- Notable relative(s): Richard Wallace (brother); David Wallace (brother)

Rugby union career
- Position: Prop
Amateur team(s)
Years	Team	Apps	(Points)
1991–1994	UCC		
1994–1996	Blackrock College		
Senior career
Years	Team	Apps	(Points)
1996–2001	Saracens	67	(45)
2001–2003	Leinster	24	(5)
International career
Years	Team	Apps	(Points)
1995–2002	Ireland	46	(25)
1997	British & Irish Lions	3	(0)

Paul Stephen Wallace (born 30 December 1971) is a former Irish rugby union player who played tight head prop for Ireland and the British & Irish Lions. Wallace was once regarded as the world's best tight-head prop, and was known as a very effective scrummager, and a player with good ball skills.

Wallace currently works for Sky Sports as a rugby pundit and is also a contributor to the Daily Mail and Rugby World magazine as well as Today FM's The Last Word.

== Rugby career ==
During his rugby playing career Wallace played with UCC, Munster, Blackrock College RFC, Leinster before moving to professional club, Saracens whom he played with from 1996 to 2001 before returning to Leinster in 2001. He played at international level with Ireland and the British Lions, representing Ireland at junior levels before making his full international debut against Japan in the 1995 Rugby World Cup in Bloemfontein to play alongside his brother Richard. He went on to win 46 caps for Ireland between 1995 and 2002. His final match for Ireland was against Georgia in a world cup qualifier at Lansdowne Road in September 2002.

Wallace was selected to tour South Africa with the 1997 British Lions. He became one of only five members of the tour who played the full duration of all three tests. He was a very influential player in the winning of the series, facing Os du Randt in the scrum and was subsequently described by captain, Martin Johnson, as his "player of the series", with tour manager Fran Cotton regarding him as the cornerstone of the Lions scrum.

=== Retirement from rugby ===
In January 2001 he suffered a seriously broken ankle playing for Saracens against Ulster, which he recovered from. But further complications saw him retire in December 2003 after winning the Celtic League with Leinster.

=== Representative honours ===
- Ireland Schools
- Ireland U21, Captain
- Ireland Students
- Ireland Development,
- Ireland A
- Ireland
- British & Irish Lions

== Post rugby career ==
Wallace is currently a pundit for Sky Sports, giving expert opinion and analysis during their rugby union broadcasts. He also writes a Saturday column for the Irish Daily Mail and is a rugby panellist for the Last Word show on Today FM. Wallace is a judging panel member for the International Rugby Board Player of the Year Award.

As well his media work, Paul is also a director of Bircroft Property Finance (Ireland), an international debt structuring firm for commercial property. He previously worked for International property company, Jones Lang La Salle, dealing in international commercial property sales and acquisitions.

== Family ==
Wallace's younger brother David, previously played for Munster, won 72 caps playing for Ireland and toured on the 2009 British & Irish Lions tour to South Africa but retired in 2012 due to a recurring knee injury. His older brother Richard played wing for Ireland, and retired from international rugby in 1999 after earning 29 caps for Ireland and touring New Zealand with the 1993 Lions. All three Wallace brothers have made the Guinness Book of Records as the only three members of one family to play for the Lions.

Wallace is married to Barbara Loftus. Loftus is senior producer to Matt Cooper on Today FM's drivetime programme, The Last Word.
