= Keith Wood =

Irish rugby union player

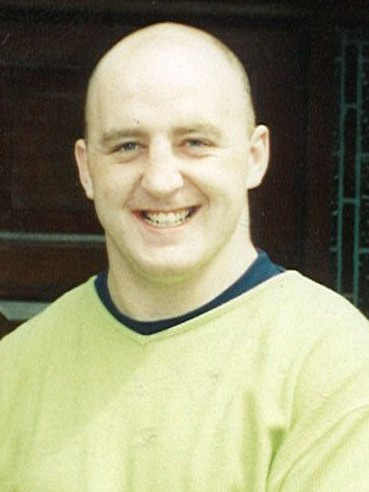
- Wood being awarded the Sportsman Shield in 2012
- Born: Keith Gerard Mallinson Wood; 27 January 1972 (age 54) Killaloe, County Clare, Ireland
- Height: 1.83 m (6 ft 0 in)
- Weight: 106 kg (16 st 10 lb; 234 lb)
- School: St Munchin's College
- Notable relative: Gordon Wood (father)

Rugby union career
- Position: Hooker
Amateur team(s)
Years	Team	Apps	(Points)
1991–1994	Garryowen		
Senior career
Years	Team	Apps	(Points)
1995–1999	Harlequins		
1999–2000	Munster	23	(30)
2000–2003	Harlequins	65	(48)
International career
Years	Team	Apps	(Points)
1994–2003	Ireland	58	(75)
1997, 2001	British & Irish Lions	5	(0)

Keith Wood (born 27 January 1972) is an Irish former rugby union player who played as a hooker at international level for Ireland, and the British & Irish Lions. He also played at club level for Garryowen, Harlequins and Munster. He was nicknamed 'The Raging Potato' because of his bald head, and as 'Uncle Fester' due to his resemblance to the character in The Addams Family. Wood is considered by many to have been the best hooker in rugby union during his era, winning the inaugural World Rugby Player of the Year award, and to be among the best hookers in the history of the game.

== Early life ==
Wood was born in Killaloe, County Clare, and educated at St Munchin's College, Limerick. His father, Gordon Wood, played prop 29 times for Ireland & won 2 caps for the Lions.

== Club career ==
Wood started his career with Garryowen who he helped to All Ireland titles in 1992 and 1994 before moving to Harlequins. He returned to play with Munster in the 1999–2000 season and played in the European Rugby Cup final that Munster lost to Northampton Saints 9–8 in Twickenham Stadium before returning to Harlequins.

Having returned to Harlequins in 2000 he started the 2000–01 Challenge Cup final beating Narbonne 42–33 in the final helping the club to become the first English club ever to win the tournament.

== International career ==
Wood made his international debut in 1994 against Australia. He was capped 58 times for Ireland and five times for the Lions. Wood captained Ireland.

He played on the 1997 and 2001 Lions tours, and was the inaugural winner of the IRB International Player of the Year award in 2001. He played a part in the Lions' 2–1 series victory over the Springboks in 1997.

He scored four tries in one game in the 1999 World Cup, in the pool stage against the USA. Ireland were later eliminated from the tournament when they lost to Argentina in the quarter-final play-off.

Wood retired from playing after the 2003 World Cup. He was succeeded as Ireland captain by Brian O'Driscoll.

== Honours ==
=== Individual ===
IRB player of the Year - 2001

=== Club ===
==== Harlequins ====
European Challenge Cup - 2001

== Legacy ==
Wood was inducted into the International Rugby Hall of Fame in 2005, and to the IRB Hall of Fame in 2014.

Wood's total of 15 full international test tries was, at his international retirement, the record for a hooker, or indeed any player in the tight five. The previous record for international tries by hookers (or players at any position in the tight five) was 12, set by Sean Fitzpatrick of the New Zealand All Blacks. Wood's record has since been beaten for tight-five players by current USA front-rower Joe Taufete'e. Taufete'e to date has scored 22 tries as a hooker and one as a prop.

== Media work ==
Wood has appearances on the BBC as a regular pundit and in The Daily Telegraph as a freelance journalist.

== Personal life ==
Wood used to play hurling, and was a member of the Clare GAA side that played in the inaugural Nenagh Co-op hurling tournament in 1988. In 2018, Wood opened a café and restaurant on the main street in his native Killaloe with business partner Malcolm Bell, called Wood & Bell.

Sporting positions
Preceded by Jim Staples	Ireland Rugby Union Captain; 1997 - 2003	Succeeded by Brian O'Driscoll
