= Justin Bishop (rugby union) =

Ireland international rugby union player

- Born: Justin Patrick Bishop; 8 November 1974 (age 52) Crawley, West Sussex, England
- Height: 6 ft 1 in (1.85 m)
- Weight: 192 lb (87 kg)
- School: Sackville College
- University: West of England University

Rugby union career
- Position(s): Wing, Fullback
- Current team: retired
Amateur team(s)
| Years | Team | Apps | (Points) |
- East Grinstead
Senior career
| Years | Team | Apps | (Points) |
| 1994–2007 | London Irish | 280 | (290) |
- Correct as of 22 June 2024
International career
| Years | Team | Apps | (Points) |
| 1998–2006 | Ireland | 25 | (40) |
- Correct as of 22 June 2024
Coaching career
- Years: Team
- 2011–2012: London Irish (Defence coach)

Justin Patrick Bishop (born 8 November 1974 in Crawley, West Sussex) is a rugby union footballer who played at wing and full-back for London Irish until the end of the 2006/2007 season. He made 279 appearances for the London Irish first XV scoring 58 tries, registering 290 points in the process. He also made 25 appearances for Ireland scoring eight tries. His grandfather Thomas Dunn of North of Ireland FC played for Ulster (3–3) and Ireland (9–17) versus the New Zealand All Blacks in 1935. He was a member of London Irish's Powergen Cup winning team of 2002, starting in the final and scoring two tries.

Justin Bishop played rugby from a young age. At six years old he joined the Mini junior section of East Grinstead. Rugby and Squash were Bishops's main interests, but chose rugby even though he was ranked at U19 level in Squash.

Bishop was previously Assistant Academy Manager at London Irish following his brief 2-year stint at Doncaster Knights as player/coach. In May 2011 he took on the role of Head of Defence for the London Irish 1st XV.

After Rugby Justin tried to enter into the entertainment industry. One song, a cover of Chris de Burgh’s song "The Lady in Red" did not get him many appearances. He now works in Marketing.
