= Jim Staples =

Ireland international rugby union player

- Born: James Edward Staples; 20 October 1965 (age 61) Bermondsey, Southwark, United Kingdom
- Height: 188 cm (6 ft 2 in)
- Weight: 87 kg (192 lb)

Rugby union career
- Position: Fullback
Senior career
Years	Team	Apps	(Points)
1991–1994	London Irish		
1994–1998	Harlequins		
Provincial / State sides
Years	Team	Apps	(Points)
1984–1990	Connacht		
International career
Years	Team	Apps	(Points)
1991–1997	Ireland	26	(25)

James Edward Staples (born 20 October 1965 in Bermondsey) is a former rugby union footballer. He played as a fullback.

He had 26 caps for Ireland, scoring 5 tries and 2 conversions, 25 points in aggregate. He played club rugby for London Irish and Harlequins. Staples alongside club colleague Simon Geoghegan also represented Connacht in the Irish Provincial Championship, which at the time served as trial games for selection to the national team.

Staples played at the 1991 Rugby World Cup and at the 1995 Rugby World Cup. He played 5 times at the Five Nations, in 1991, 1992, 1995, 1996 and 1997.

During his playing career Staples weighed 82 kg and was 1.88m in height.
