= Young Munster =

Irish rugby union club based in Limerick, Co.Limerick

(Republic of Ireland) Young Munster
- Full name: Young Munster Rugby Football Club
- Union: (Ireland) IRFU
- Branch: Munster
- Nickname: The Cookies
- Founded: 1895; 131 years ago
- Ground(s): Tom Clifford Park, Limerick
- President: John Fitzgerald
- Coach: Ger Slattery
- Captain: Alan Kennedy
- League: All-Ireland Div. 1A
- 2024–25: 7th.
Team kit

Official website
- www.youngmunster.com

Young Munster is a rugby union club based in Limerick, Ireland, playing in Division 1A of the All-Ireland League. Also known by its nickname "The Cookies", the club was founded in 1895 and are ten-time Munster Senior Cup winners and nine-time Munster Junior Cup winners.

Young Munster plays home matches at Tom Clifford Park in Rosbrien, named for a former player who was capped for Ireland and toured with the Lions.

== History ==
Young Munster was founded in 1895 and joined the Munster branch of the Irish Rugby Football Union in 1910 as a junior club,, and was promoted to senior status in the 1920s. In 1928, a Young Munster team featuring future Ireland internationals Ter Casey and Danaher Sheahan won the club's first Munster Senior Cup and became the first Limerick rugby club to win the Bateman Cup. The club song, "Beautiful Munsters", remembers this victory.

After two more Senior Cup wins in 1930 and 1938, the club would not win the trophy again until 1980, beating city rivals Bohemians RFC in the final. The next cup victory took only four years, as the club won both the junior and senior cups in 1984. In 1985, the club was one of the first Irish teams to tour North America, when they played five games in New York City, Vancouver, Langley, Los Angeles and San Diego.

The club's 1990 Munster Senior Cup win preceded a streak of ten losing final appearances until 2010, including five in a row between 1991 and 1996. The All-Ireland League began in the 1990–91 season and Young Munster were initially placed in the second division, winning promotion to the top flight that season.

In 1993, the club won the league - its first national title since 1928 - beating St Mary's College 17–14 at Lansdowne Road in front of a record attendance for a club game of 17,000.

After a decade in the All-Ireland League Division 1, the club was relegated to Division 2 in 2002. They returned to Division 1 in 2008–2009. In 2009–2010, due to the League's new format, they played in Division 1B; they won promotion to Division 1A by finishing in second place behind Old Belvedere R.F.C. Young Munster finished the 2010–2011 regular season in third place in Division 1A, thereby earning a place in the All-Ireland League semi-finals, away to Cork Constitution F.C.

== Honours ==
- All-Ireland League (1): 1992–93
- All-Ireland Cup (1): 1927–28
- Munster Senior Cup (10): 1927–28, 1929–30, 1937–38, 1979–80, 1983–84, 1989–90, 2009–10, 2020–21, 2021–22, 2022–23
- Munster Senior League (5): 1929–30, 1931–32, 1943–44, 1951–52, 1995–96
- Munster Junior Cup (9): 1911, 1922, 1927, 1959, 1960, 1984, 1999, 2016, 2022

== Notable players ==
Four players represented the British and Irish Lions played at Young Munster, Tom Clifford, Keith Earls, Rob Henderson and Paul O'Connell.

- Ter Casey
- Tom Clifford
- Peter Clohessy
- Keith Earls
- Chris Farrell
- Dan Goggin
- Rob Henderson
- Calvin Nash
- Mike Mullins
- Paul O'Connell
- Danaher Sheehan
- Fineen Wycherley
