= Garryowen Football Club =

Rugby union club in Limerick, Ireland

(Republic of Ireland) Garryowen
- Full name: Garryowen Football Club
- Union: (Ireland) IRFU
- Branch: Munster
- Nickname(s): Boys in Blue; The Light Blues
- Founded: 1884; 142 years ago
- Ground(s): Dooradoyle, Limerick V94 FW62 (Capacity: 1,500)
- Chairman: Colin Varley
- President: David Geoghegan
- Coach(es): Michael Sherry; Shane O'Brien; Willie Staunton
- Captain: Bryan Fitzgerald / Des Fitzgerald
- League: All-Ireland League Div. 1B
Team kit

Official website
- garryowenrugby.com

Garryowen Football Club (Irish: Cumann Rugbaí Gharraí Eoin), usually referred to as Garryowen, is a rugby union club from Limerick, Ireland. As at the 2024–25 season, it plays in Division 1A of the All-Ireland League (AIL). Historically, Garryowen has been one of the most successful clubs in Irish rugby union.

== History ==
The club was formed in 1884 when two previous clubs, Rangers and Catholic Institute, merged. The founding members of the club were:

- President W.L. Stokes
- Secretary J. Gogarty
- Treasurer Michael Joyce
- Captain J. O'Sullivan
- Messrs. Patrick Stapleton, Tom Prendergast, John O'Connor, J.G. O'Brien, Roche, Riordan, Pender, Gilligan and Dick

Founding club president Stokes helped form the Munster Senior Cup, although the club lost the inaugural final to Bandon. Garryowen were at the forefront of Munster rugby before the First World War, winning ten Munster Senior League titles, and 15 Munster Senior Cups in their first three decades of existence.

The club has had two fixed homes: the Markets Field until 1957, then Dooradoyle ever since. After the club moved, Garryowen (which had won the Senior Cup in 1954) did not achieve success again for 15 years – the longest period in the club's history without a cup win. After victory in 1969, four further Senior Cups came in the next 10 years, complemented by success on the international scene, with six players winning Ireland caps in this period.

After winning the Cup in 1979, the club did not achieve Cup success again until 1993. Although this was not the largest gap between wins, this was the first time that they had failed to win at least one cup in each decade. Back-to-back Munster Senior League successes in 1982 and 1983 were the highlights of the 80's. The foundations were laid for the great success that was achieved in the 90's. The advent of the All-Ireland League would give the club game in Limerick a platform.

Having won the league title in its second and fourth year (1992, 1994), Garryowen reached two finals and a number of semi-finals without winning the Cup. However, in 2007 Limerick retook the AIL crown as well as the Munster Senior and AIL cups in an unprecedented clean sweep of all domestic competitions in Irish club rugby.

In total Garryowen have won the Munster Senior Cup 38 times, more times than any other club. Garryowen won the trophy nine times in a row between 1889 and 1898 and have the distinction of having played in the first final in 1886 and the 100th final in 1986.

== The garryowen kick ==
In playing terms a garryowen is a very high kick with a deliberately long time in flight rather than pure distance, named after the rugby club designed to put the opposing team under pressure by allowing the kicking team time to arrive under and compete for the high ball. It is thought to have come part of the modern lexicon in the early 1920s as one of the Garryowen teams that won three Senior cups from 1924 to 1926 used this tactic to the utmost. The 'garryowen' was immortalised as a 'descriptive' to the British sporting public by the doyen of BBC Rugby Union commentators Bill McLaren who frequently used it in his decades on air between 1953 and 2002. He often used the phrase "hoists the garryowen" rather than "kicks" adding additional colour to his commentary. In rugby league a similar kick is usually referred to as an up and under, while a similar kick in American football can occur in fourth down situations, when the team in possession 'punts' although the kicking team cannot retain possession as in the rugby codes.

== Honours ==
- All-Ireland League (3):

1992, 1994, 2007

- All-Ireland Cup (3)
  - 2006–07, 2011–12, 2018–19
- Munster Senior Cup (40):

1889, 1890, 1891, 1892, 1893, 1894, 1895, 1896, 1898, 1899, 1902, 1903, 1904, 1908, 1909, 1911, 1914, 1920, 1924, 1925, 1926, 1932, 1934, 1940, 1947, 1952, 1954, 1969, 1971, 1974, 1975, 1979, 1993, 1995, 1997, 1999, 2007, 2012, 2018, 2024

- Munster Senior League (17):

1903, 1904, 1905, 1906, 1907, 1908, 1909, 1910, 1911, 1912, 1925, 1936, 1946, 1954, 1982, 1983, 2001

- Munster Junior Cup (9):

1910, 1955, 1970, 1976, 1978, 1993, 2007, 2013, 2023

== Notable players ==
See also Category:Garryowen Football Club players

Founding member of the club, W.L. Stokes, had a huge influence on the game in Limerick during the 1880s, ensuring that the club joined the IRFU upon formation and was one of the founders of the Munster Senior Cup.

John O'Connor was a founder member of the club and his seven sons were prominent rugby players, runners and oarsmen of national and international renown. Born in Athlunkard Street, Limerick, the seven brothers - Mick, Charlie, Jack, Thade, Joe, Bryan and Jim won 37 Munster Senior Cup (rugby union) medals between them beginning in the early 1890s. Jack with 10 had the most, and his son, Mick, won four further Munster Senior Cup medals between 1925 and 1934.

=== Ireland ===
The following Garryowen players have represented Ireland at full international level, 56 players in total. The club has had players represent Ireland at every position.

- Mike Sherry, 1 Cap, 2014 (USA) to present
- Conor Murray, 100 Caps, 2011 (Fra) to present
- Damien Varley, 3 Caps, 2010 (Aus) to present
- Rob Henderson 32 Caps, 1996 (Samoa) to 2003 (Italy)
- Paul Burke, 13 Caps, 1995 (Eng) to 2003 (Samoa)
- Jeremy Staunton, 5 Caps, 2001 (Samoa) to present
- David Wallace 72 Caps, 2000 (Arg) to 2011 (Eng), Member of the 2009 Grand Slam winning team
- Tom Tierney, 8 Caps, 1999 (Aus) to 2000 (Eng)
- Killian Keane, 1 Cap, 1998 (E)
- Dominic Crotty, 5 Caps, 1996 (A) to 2000 (Canada)
- Stephen McIvor, 3 caps, 1996 (A), 1997 (It,S)
- Ben Cronin, 2 Caps, 1995 (S), 1997 (S)
- Keith Wood, 58 Caps, 1994 (Aus)-2003 (France)
- Richard Costello, 1 Cap, 1993 (S)
- Paul Hogan, 1 Cap, 1992 (F)
- Neville Furlong, 2 Caps, 1992 (NZ)
- Nicky Barry, 1 Cap, 1991 (Namibia)
- Richard Wallace, 29 Caps 1991 (Nm), 1998 (E)
- Philip Danaher, 28 Caps (also played with Lansdowne) 1988 (Scot) to 1995 (Wales)
- Willie Sexton, 4 Caps, 1984 (A), 1988 (S,E,E)
- Tony Ward 19 Caps (also played with St Marys), 1978 (S,F,W,E,NZ), 1979 (F,W,E,S), 1981 (W,E,S,A), 1983 (E), 1984 (E,S), 1986 (S), 1987 (C,Tg)
- Pat Whelan, 19 Caps
- Larry A.Moloney, 4 Caps, 1976 (W,S), 1978 (S,NZ)
- Mick Sherry, 2 Caps (also played with UCD) 1975 (F,W)
- Seamus Dennison, 3 Caps, 1975 (F), 1975 (E,S)
- Shay Deering (Jr.) 8 Caps (also played with St Marys) 1974 (W), 1976 (F,W,E,S), 1977 (W,E), 1978 (NZ)
- Johnny C.Moroney], 6 Caps, 1968 (W,A), 1969 (F,E,S,W)
- Mick Doyle, 20 Caps (also played for Blackrock & UCD), 1965 (F,E,S,W,SA), 1966 (F,E,S,W), 1967 (A1,E,S,W,F,A2), 1968 (F,E,S,W,A)
- J.C.Kelly, 11 Caps (also played with UCD), 1962 (F,W), 1963 (F,E,S,W,NZ), 1964 (E,S,W,F)
- Tom J.Nesdale, 1 Cap, 1961 (F)
- Noel Murphy 49 Caps, 1958 (Aus)-69 (Wales)
- Tim McGrath, 7 Caps, 1956 (W), 1958 (F), 1960 (E,S,W,F), 1961 (SA)
- Gordon Wood 29 Caps, 1954 (E,S), 1956 (F,E,S,W), 1957 (F,E,S,W), 1958 (A,E,S,W,F), 1959 (E,S,W,F), 1960 (E,S,W,F,SA), 1961 (E,S,W,F,SA)
- Tom E. Reid, 13 Caps, 1953 (E,S,W), 1954 (NZ,F), 1955 (E,S), 1956 (F,E), 1957 (F,E,S,W)
- Aengus D. McMorrow, 1 Cap, 1951 (W)
- Hugh Delacy, 2 Caps, 1948 (E,S)
- Paddy Reid, 4 Caps, 1947 (A), 1948 (F,E,W), Member of Ireland's first Grand Slam winning team
- Dave B. O'Loughlin, 6 Caps (also played with UCC), 1938 (E,S,W), 1939 (E,S,W)
- Shay M. Deering, 9 Caps (also played with Bective Rangers), 1935 (E,S,W,NZ), 1936 (E,S,W), 1937 (E,S)
- D.G.Langan, 1 Cap (also played with Clontarf), 1934 (W)
- Anthony Sheehan, 1 Cap (also played with Munster), 1927 (S)
- Dr. A.W. Courtenay, 7 Caps, 1920 (S,W,F), 1921 (E,S,W,F)
- Noel Butler, 1 Cap (also played with Bective Rangers & Young Munster), 1920 (E)
- Dr.P.J. Stokes, 12 Caps, 1913 (E,S), 1914 (F), 1920 (E,S,W,F), 1921 (E,S,F), 1922 (W,F)
- J.J. Clune, 6 Caps (also played with Blackrock Coll), 1912 (SA), 1913 (W,F), 1914 (F,E,W)
- G.V. Killeen, 10 Caps, 1912 (E,S,W), 1913 (E,S,W,F), 1914 (E,S,W)
- R.V. Jackson, 10 Caps (also played with Wanderers), 1911 (E,S,W,F), 1913 (W,F), 1914 (F,E,S,W)
- Joe J. O'Connor, 1 Cap, 1909 (F)
- T. Halpin, 13 Caps, 1909 (S,W,F), 1910 (E,S,W), 1911 (E,S,W,F), 1912 (F,E,S)
- G.J. Henebry, 6 Caps, 1906 (E,S,W,SA), 1909 (W,F)
- Pa Healy, 11 Caps, 1901 (E,S,W), 1902 (E,S,W), 1903 (E,S,W), 1904 (S)
- Jack O'Connor, 1 Cap, 1895 (S)
- Michael S.Egan, 2 Caps, 1893 (E), 1895 (S)
- T.F. Peel, 3 Caps, 1892 (E,S,W)
- George Collopy, 2 Caps (also played for Bective Rangers), 1891 (S), 1892 (S)
- T. Fogarty, 1 Cap, 1891 (W)
- Jack Macauley, 2 Caps, 1887 (E,S)
- J.M. O'Sullivan, 2 Caps, 1884 (S), 1887 (S)

=== British & Irish Lions ===
The following Garryowen players have also represented the British & Irish Lions.

- Conor Murray: 2013, 2017 played in 5 tests.
- David Wallace: 2001, 2009, played in 3 tests.
- Rob Henderson, 2001, played in 3 tests.
- Keith Wood: 1997, 2001, played in 5 tests.
- Richard Wallace, 1993, played in 0 tests.
- Tony Ward: 1980, played in 1 test.
- Mick Doyle, 1968, played in 1 test.
- Noel Murphy: 1959, 1966, played in 8 tests.
- Gordon Wood: 1959, played in 2 tests.
- Tom Reid, 1955, played in 2 tests.

=== Captains of Ireland ===
- Keith Wood,
- Philip Danaher

=== Former presidents of the IRFU ===
- J.Macauley,
- J.M.O'Sullivan,
- D.G.O'Donovan,
- K.J.Quilligan,
- J.Quilligan
- Declan Maddan

=== Other notables ===
- Eddie O'Sullivan, Coach of Ireland 2001-2008
- Ben Healy Outhalf for Scotland and Ireland u20s

== 2018/19 Squad ==
- Full-backs: Andrew O'Byrne, Jamie Heuston
- Wings: Alex Wootton, Liam Coombes, Cian O'Shea, Ronan O'Mahony, Dan Hurley, John Hurley
- Centres: Peadar Collins, Dave McCarthy, Bryan Fitzgerald, Matt More, Sammy Arnold
- Out-halves: Jamie Gavin, Bill Johnston, Ben Healy, Ben Swindlehurst
- Scrum-halves: Neil Cronin, Rob Guerin, Ed Barry, Evan Maher, Steven Atkinson
- Front-rows: Niall Horan, Mike O'Donnell, Andrew Keating, Ben Rowley, Jack Mullany, Jeremy Loughman
- Hookers: Liam Cronin, Diarmuid Barron, David Canny
- Second-rows: Scott Leahy, Dean Moore, Kevin Seymour, Roy Whelan, Seán O'Connor
- Back Rows: Tim Ferguson, Conor Oliver, Jack Daly, Darren Ryan, Alan Fitzgerald, Sean Rennison, Mikey Wilson
