= 2001–02 Leinster Rugby season =

- Ground(s): Donnybrook, Dublin
- Coach: Matt Williams
- League(s): Celtic League (champions); Heineken Cup (quarter-final); IRFU Interprovincial Championship (champions)

2001-02 was Leinster's seventh season under professionalism, and their second under head coach Matt Williams.

The Irish, Scottish and Welsh unions agreed a format for the inaugural Celtic League in May 2001. It would involve all four Irish provinces, two teams from Scotland and nine from Wales, organised in two conferences. It would kick off on 18 August, with the final scheduled for 15 December. Celtic league fixtures between Ulster and Leinster, and between Munster and Connacht, would count towards this year's IRFU Interprovincial Championship. The remaining Interprovincial fixtures would take place in April 2002.

The "Leinster Lions" name came into existence during the 2001–02 season as the result of a joint marketing initiative between Leinster Rugby and its kit sponsors, the Canterbury Clothing Company.

Leinster's first season in the newly formed Celtic League ended in success as the Lions were crowned the inaugural champions, beating rivals Munster Rugby in the 2001–02 final.

== Player transfers ==
=== Players in ===
- (England) Steve Barretto
- (Ireland) David Blaney
- (Ireland) Niall Breslin
- (Ireland) Keith Gleeson from (Australia) Waratahs
- (Ireland) Gavin Hickie
- (Ireland) Shane Jennings
- (Australia) Adam Magro from (Australia) Waratahs
- (Ireland) Aidan McCullen
- (New Zealand) Nathan Spooner from (Australia) Queensland Reds
- (Ireland) Niall Treston
- (Ireland) Paul Wallace from (England) Saracens
- (New Zealand) Ben Willis from (France) Grenoble

=== Players out ===
- (Ireland) G. Dunphy
- (Ireland) Gabriel Fulcher
- (Ireland) Gary Halpin
- (Ireland) Derek Hegarty
- (New Zealand) Eddie Hekenui
- (Ireland) Colin McEntee
- (Ireland) Mark McHugh to (Ireland) Connacht
- (Ireland) Declan O'Brien
- (New Zealand) Kevin Putt
- (Ireland) Rory Sheriff
- (Australia) Nathan Turner

== Squad ==
Leinster Rugby squad
**Props**: (England) Steve Barretto; (Ireland) **Emmet Byrne**; (Ireland) **Reggie Corrigan**; (Ireland) Peter Coyle; (Ireland) Niall Treston; (Ireland) **Paul Wallace**; **Hookers**: (Ireland) David Blaney; (Ireland) James Blaney; (Ireland) **Shane Byrne**; (Ireland) Gavin Hickie; (Ireland) Peter Smyth; **Locks**: (Ireland) Niall Breslin; (Ireland) **Bob Casey**; (Ireland) Leo Cullen; (Ireland) **Malcolm O'Kelly**	**Back row**: (Ireland) **Trevor Brennan**; (Ireland) **Victor Costello**; (Ireland) Keith Gleeson; (Ireland) Shane Jennings; (Ireland) Aidan McCullen; (Ireland) **Eric Miller**; (Ireland) Liam Toland; **Scrum-halves**: (Ireland) **Brian O'Meara**; (New Zealand) Ben Willis; **Fly-halves**: (Ireland) Andy Dunne; (Ireland) Emmett Farrell; (New Zealand) **Nathan Spooner**	**Centres**: (Ireland) **Shane Horgan**; (Australia) **Adam Magro**; (Ireland) **Brian O'Driscoll**; (Ireland) David Quinlan; **Wings**: (Ireland) **Gordon D'Arcy**; (Ireland) **Denis Hickie** (c); (Ireland) Simon Keogh; (Ireland) **John McWeeney**; (Ireland) James Norton; **Fullbacks**: (Ireland) **Girvan Dempsey**; (Ireland) **Peter McKenna**
(c) denotes the team captain, **Bold** denotes internationally capped players.^{*} denotes players qualified to play for Ireland on residency or dual nationality.

== Celtic League ==
=== Pool A ===
==== Pool A standings ====
Pos	Team	Pld	W	D	L	PF	PA	PD	Pts	Qualification
1	Leinster (C)	7	7	0	0	281	114	+167	21	Advance to knockout stage
2	Ulster	7	4	1	2	194	157	+37	13	Advance to knockout stage
3	Glasgow	7	4	1	2	204	172	+32	13	Advance to knockout stage
4	Llanelli	7	4	0	3	175	123	+52	12	Advance to knockout stage
5	Swansea	7	3	0	4	124	158	−34	9	
6	Bridgend	7	3	0	4	161	208	−47	9	
7	Pontypridd	7	1	0	6	111	207	−96	3	
8	Ebbw Vale	7	1	0	6	134	245	−111	3	

Source: globalrugbyresults.com
(C) Champion

==== Pool A results ====
17 August	**Leinster**	**39–11**	**Glasgow**	Donnybrook Stadium
19:35		Report		Attendance: 4,500; Referee: Paul Adams (Wales)

24 August	**Llanelli**	**17–19**	**Leinster**	Stradey Park
19:05		Report		Attendance: 4,000; Referee: Nigel Whitehouse (Wales)

28 August	**Leinster**	**55–13**	**Ebbw Vale**	Donnybrook Stadium
19:00		Report		Attendance: 3,200; Referee: John Barnard (England)

31 August	**Leinster**	**31–9**	**Ulster**	{{{stadium}}}
19:35		Report		Referee: Nigel Williams (Wales)

8 September	**Bridgend**	**32–51**	**Leinster**	Brewery Field
19:30		Report		Attendance: 2,650; Referee: Steve Lander (England)

11 September	**Leinster**	**52–14**	**Pontypridd**	Donnybrook Stadium
19:00		Report		Attendance: 3,056; Referee: Rob Dixon (England)

15 September	**Swansea**	**18–34**	**Leinster**	St Helen's
14:30		Report		Attendance: 4,000; Referee: Iain Ramage (Scotland)

=== Quarter-final ===
30 November	**Leinster**	**34–22**	**Newport**	Donnybrook Stadium
19:35		Report		Attendance: 7,300

=== Semi-final ===
7 December	**Leinster**	**35–13**	**Glasgow**	Lansdowne Road
19:30		Report		Attendance: 5,500

=== Final ===
15 December	**Leinster**	**24–20**	**Munster**	Lansdowne Road
15:00		Report		Attendance: 30,000; Referee: Nigel Whitehouse (Wales)
Leinster lineup: 1. Reggie Corrigan, 2. Shane Byrne, 3. Paul Wallace, 4. Leo Cullen, 5. Malcolm O'Kelly, 6. Eric Miller, 7. Keith Gleeson, 8. Victor Costello, 9. Brian O'Meara, 10. Nathan Spooner, 11. Gordon D'Arcy, 12. Shane Horgan, 13. Brian O'Driscoll, 14. Denis Hickie, 15. Girvan Dempsey.; Replacements: 16. Peter Coyle, 17. Gavin Hickie, 18. Bob Casey, 19. Trevor Brennan, 20 Ben Willis, 21. Peter McKenna.				Attendance: 30,000; Referee: Nigel Whitehouse (Wales)

== Heineken Cup ==
=== Pool 6 ===
Team	P	W	D	L	Tries for	Tries against	Try diff	Points for	Points against	Points diff	Pts
(Ireland) **Leinster**	6	5	0	1	15	11	4	139	104	35	**10**
(Wales) Newport	6	3	0	3	17	13	4	151	146	5	**6**
(France) Toulouse	6	3	0	3	16	11	5	158	141	17	**6**
(England) Newcastle	6	1	0	5	8	21	−13	117	174	−57	**2**

28 September 2001; 19:00	**Leinster (Ireland)**	**40–10**	**(France) Toulouse**	Donnybrook
				Attendance: 7,500
Leinster lineup: 1. Reggie Corrigan, 2. Shane Byrne, 3. Emmet Byrne, 4. Leo Cullen, 5. Malcolm O'Kelly, 6. Eric Miller, 7. Keith Gleeson, 8. Victor Costello, 9. Brian O'Meara, 10. Nathan Spooner, 11. Gordon D'Arcy, 12. Shane Horgan, 13. Brian O'Driscoll, 14. Denis Hickie, 15. Girvan Dempsey.; Replacements: Peter Coyle, Gavin Hickie, Bob Casey, Trevor Brennan.				Attendance: 7,500

5 October 2001; 19:00	**Leinster (Ireland)**	**28–9**	**(England) Newcastle Falcons**	Donnybrook
				Attendance: 7,500
Leinster lineup: 1. Reggie Corrigan, 2. Shane Byrne, 3. Emmet Byrne, 4. Leo Cullen, 5. Malcolm O'Kelly, 6. Eric Miller, 7. Keith Gleeson, 8. Victor Costello, 9. Brian O'Meara, 10. Nathan Spooner, 11. Gordon D'Arcy, 12. Shane Horgan, 13. Brian O'Driscoll, 14. Denis Hickie, 15. Girvan Dempsey.; Replacements: Adam Magro (for D'Arcy), Andy Dunne (for Spooner), Ben Willis (for O'Meara), Gavin Hickie (for S. Byrne), Peter Coyle (for E. Byrne), Bob Casey (for Cullen), Trevor Brennan (for Costello).				Attendance: 7,500

26 October 2001; 19:00	**Leinster (Ireland)**	**21–6**	**(Wales) Newport**	Donnybrook
				Attendance: 7,500
Leinster lineup: 1. Reggie Corrigan, 2. Shane Byrne, 3. Emmet Byrne, 4. Leo Cullen, 5. Malcolm O'Kelly, 6. Eric Miller, 7. Keith Gleeson, 8. Victor Costello, 9. Brian O'Meara, 10. Nathan Spooner, 11. Gordon D'Arcy, 12. Shane Horgan, 13. Adam Magro, 14. Denis Hickie, 15. Girvan Dempsey.; Replacements: Peter McKenna, Trevor Brennan, Bob Casey. referee =				Attendance: 7,500

2 November 2001; 19:05	**Newport (Wales)**	**21–26**	**(Ireland) Leinster**	Rodney Parade
				Attendance: 10,285
Leinster lineup: 1. Reggie Corrigan, 2. Shane Byrne, 3. Emmet Byrne, 4. Leo Cullen, 5. Malcolm O'Kelly, 6. Eric Miller, 7. Keith Gleeson, 8. Victor Costello, 9. Brian O'Meara, 10. Nathan Spooner, 11. Gordon D'Arcy, 12. Shane Horgan, 13. Brian O'Driscoll, 14. Simon Keogh, 15. Peter McKenna.; Replacements: Adam Magro, Bob Casey, Trevor Brennan.				Attendance: 10,285

8 January 2002; 19:30	**Newcastle Falcons (England)**	**15–17**	**(Ireland) Leinster**	Headingley Stadium
				Attendance: 1,146
Leinster lineup: 1. Reggie Corrigan, 2. Shane Byrne, 3. Paul Wallace, 4. Leo Cullen, 5. Malcolm O'Kelly, 6. Trevor Brennan, 7. Keith Gleeson, 8. Victor Costello, 9. Brian O'Meara, 10. Nathan Spooner, 11. Gordon D'Arcy, 12. Shane Horgan, 13. Brian O'Driscoll, 14. Denis Hickie, 15. Girvan Dempsey.; Replacements: Ben Willis.				Attendance: 1,146

13 January 2002; 14:30	**Toulouse (France)**	**43–7**	**(Ireland) Leinster**	Stadium Municipal
				Attendance: 6,746
Leinster lineup: 1. Reggie Corrigan, 2. Shane Byrne, 3. Paul Wallace, 4. Leo Cullen, 5. Bob Casey, 6. Trevor Brennan, 7. Victor Costello, 8. Keith Gleeson, 9. Brian O'Meara, 10. Brian O'Driscoll, 11. Gordon D'Arcy, 12. Shane Horgan, 13. Adam Magro, 14. Denis Hickie, 15. Girvan Dempsey.; Replacements: Simon Keogh, Ben Willis, Peter McKenna, Peter Coyle, Gavin Hickie, Aidan McCullen.				Attendance: 6,746

=== Quarter-final ===
27 January 2002; 15:00	**Leicester Tigers (England)**	**29–18**	**(Ireland) Leinster**	Welford Road
		Report		Attendance: 16,249
Leinster lineup: 1. Reggie Corrigan, 2. Shane Byrne, 3. Paul Wallace, 4. Leo Cullen, 5. Bob Casey, 6. Eric Miller, 7. Keith Gleeson, 8. Victor Costello, 9. Brian O'Meara, 10. Nathan Spooner, 11. Gordon D'Arcy, 12. Shane Horgan, 13. Brian O'Driscoll, 14. Denis Hickie, 15. Girvan Dempsey.; Replacements: Adam Magro, Simon Keogh, Gavin Hickie, Peter Coyle, Aidan McCullen, Trevor Brennan.				Attendance: 16,249

== IRFU Interprovincial Championship ==
The 2001–02 IRFU Interprovincial Championship was a transitional season before the competition was superseded by the Celtic League. Pool matches between Irish provinces in the 2001–02 Celtic League counted towards the championship. The remaining Interprovincial fixtures were originally scheduled to take place in December 2001, but were postponed because IRFU director of fitness Dr. Liam Hennessy felt that the schedule, between the Celtic League, the Heineken Cup and the Autumn internationals, was too onerous and players needed a period of rest and recovery to prepare for the Six Nations. They took place in April and May 2002.

Team	P	W	D	L	F	A	BP	Pts	Status
Leinster	3	2	0	1	86	35	2	12	Champions; qualified for 2002–03 Heineken Cup
Ulster	3	2	0	1	50	66	0	8	Qualified for 2002–03 Heineken Cup
Munster	3	1	1	1	64	48	1	7	Qualified for 2002–03 Heineken Cup
Connacht	3	0	0	3	56	107	1	1	Qualified 2002–03 European Challenge Cup

19 April 2002	**Munster**	**6–6**	**Leinster**	Musgrave Park
	Pen: O'Gara; Holland	Report	Pen: Spooner (2)

8 May 2002	**Connacht**	**20-49**	**Leinster**	Galway Sportsgrounds
	Try: Keane; McHugh; Con: Elwood (2); Pen: Elwood (2)	Report	Try: Corrigan; Keogh; McKenna; O'Driscoll (2); McCullen; Con: O'Meara (5); Pen: O'Meara (3)
