= 2000–01 Leinster Rugby season =

- Ground(s): Donnybrook, Dublin
- Coach: Matt Williams
- League(s): Heineken Cup (3rd in pool); IRFU Interprovincial Championship (3rd)

The 2000-01 season was Leinster's sixth season under professionalism, and their first under head coach Matt Williams, their former backs coach, replacing Mike Ruddock, who had returned to Wales to coach Ebbw Vale.

== Player transfers ==
=== Players in ===
- (Ireland) Andy Dunne from (Ireland) Old Belvedere
- (New Zealand) Eddie Hekenui
- (Ireland) Simon Keogh from (Ireland) Old Belvedere
- (Ireland) Eric Miller from (Ireland) Ulster
- (Ireland) James Norton from (Ireland) Dublin University
- (Ireland) Brian O'Meara from (Ireland) Munster
- (New Zealand) Kevin Putt from (England) London Irish
- (Ireland) Rory Sheriff from (Ireland) Terenure
- (Australia) Nathan Turner from (England) Oldham Bears

=== Players out ===
- (Ireland) Brian Cusack to (Ireland) Lansdowne
- (Ireland) Barry Everitt to (England) London Irish
- (New Zealand) Stu Forster
- (Ireland) Gareth Gannon to (Ireland) St Mary's
- (Ireland) Angus McKeen to (Ireland) Lansdowne
- (Ireland) Ciaran Scally (retired)
- (South Africa) Dan Whiston

== Squad ==
Leinster Rugby squad
**Props**: (Ireland) Emmet Byrne; (Ireland) **Reggie Corrigan**; (Ireland) Peter Coyle; (Ireland) **Gary Halpin**; **Hookers**: (Ireland) James Blaney; (Ireland) Shane Byrne; (Ireland) Peter Smyth; **Locks**: (Ireland) Bob Casey; (Ireland) Leo Cullen; (Ireland) **Gabriel Fulcher**; (Ireland) **Malcolm O'Kelly**	**Back row**: (Ireland) **Trevor Brennan**; (Ireland) **Victor Costello**; (Ireland) Colin McEntee; (Ireland) Eric Miller; (Ireland) Declan O'Brien; (Ireland) Liam Toland; **Scrum-halves**: (Ireland) Derek Hegarty; (Ireland) Brian O'Meara; (New Zealand) Kevin Putt; **Fly-halves**: (Ireland) Andy Dunne; (Ireland) Emmett Farrell; (New Zealand) Eddie Hekenui; (Ireland) Mark McHugh; (Australia) Nathan Turner	**Centres**: (Ireland) Shane Horgan; (Ireland) **Brian O'Driscoll**; (Ireland) Rory Sheriff; (Australia) Nathan Turner; **Wings**: (Ireland) Gordon D'Arcy; (Ireland) **Denis Hickie** (c); (Ireland) Simon Keogh; (Ireland) Peter McKenna; (Ireland) **John McWeeney**; (Ireland) James Norton; **Fullbacks**: (Ireland) **Girvan Dempsey**; (Ireland) G. Dunphy
(c) denotes the team captain, **Bold** denotes internationally capped players.^{*} denotes players qualified to play for Ireland on residency or dual nationality.

== IRFU Interprovincial Championship ==
Team	P	W	D	L	F	A	BP	Pts	Status
Munster	6	5	1	0	151	99	1	23	Champions; qualified for 2001–02 Heineken Cup
Ulster	6	3	0	3	144	119	3	15	Qualified for 2001–02 Heineken Cup
Leinster	6	2	1	3	109	111	2	12	Qualified for 2001–02 Heineken Cup
Connacht	6	1	0	5	100	175	1	5	Qualified for 2001–02 European Challenge Cup

2 September 2000	**Leinster**	**21-15**	**Connacht**	Donnybrook Stadium
	Try: Costello; Smyth; Hickie; Pen: Dempsey (2); Cards: Miller (yellow card); Casey	Report	Pen: Elwod (5); Cards: Uijs (yellow card); McConnell (red card)
**Leinster lineup**: 1. Reggie Corrigan, 2. Shane Byrne, 3. Emmet Burne, 4. Bob Casey, 5. Malcolm O'Kelly, 6. Eric Miller, 7. Victor Costello, 8. Liam Toland, 9. Brian O'Meara, 10. Nathan Turner, 11. Gordon D'Arcy, 12. Shane Horgan, 13. Peter McKenna, 14. Denis Hickie, 15. Girvan Dempsey.; Replacements: Trevor Brennan (for Miller 40'), Leo Cullen (for Casey 65'), Peter Smyth (for S. Byrne 67'), Mark McHugh (for Turner 67').

8 September 2000	**Munster**	**26–20**	**Leinster**	Musgrave Park
		Report

15 September 2000	**Leinster**	**19-6**	**Ulster**	Donnybrook
	Try: Hickie; Con: McHugh; Pen: McHugh (2); Dempsey	Report	Pen: Humphreys (2)

22 September 2000	**Ulster**	**26-13**	**Leinster**	Ravenhill
	Try: J. Bell; Ward; Con: Humphreys (2); Pen: Humphreys (4)	Report	Try: McHugh; Con: McHugh; Drop: O'Driscoll

29 September 2000	**Connacht**	**22-20**	**Leinster**	Galway Sportsgrounds
		Report

3 November 2000	**Leinster**	**16–16**	**Munster**	Donnybrook
		Report

== Heineken Cup ==
=== Pool 1 ===
Team	P	W	D	L	Tries for	Tries against	Try diff	Points for	Points against	Points diff	Pts
(France) Biarritz Olympique	6	4	0	2	13	20	−7	164	152	12	**8**
(Scotland) Edinburgh Reivers	6	3	1	2	17	12	5	154	141	13	**7**
(Ireland) Leinster	6	3	1	2	13	14	−1	149	156	−7	**7**
(England) Northampton	6	1	0	5	17	14	3	138	156	−18	**2**

Edinburgh finished above Leinster despite having a lower points difference, as the first tie-breaker was the results in the two matches between the teams.

6 October 2000; 19:00	**Edinburgh (Scotland)**	**29–21**	**(Ireland) Leinster**	Myreside
				Attendance: 3,700
Leinster lineup: 1. Reggie Corrigan, 2. Shane Byrne, 3. Emmett Byrne, 4. Leo Cullen, 5. Malcolm O'Kelly, 6. Eric Miller, 7. Liam Toland, 8. Victor Costello, 9. Kevin Putt, 10. Eddie Hekenui, 11. Gordon D'Arcy, 12. Shane Horgan, 13. Brian O'Driscoll, 14. Denis Hickie, 15. Girvan Dempsey.; Replacements: Peter McKenna, Mark McHugh, Peter Smyth, Gary Halpin, Bob Casey.				Attendance: 3,700

13 October 2000; 19:00	**Leinster (Ireland)**	**35–9**	**(France) Biarritz**	Donnybrook
				Attendance: 4,000
Leinster lineup: 1. Reggie Corrigan, 2. Shane Byrne, 3. Emmett Byrne, 4. Bob Casey, 5. Malcolm O'Kelly, 6. Trevor Brennan, 7. Liam Toland, 8. Victor Costello, 9. Kevin Putt, 10. Eddie Hekenui, 11. Gordon D'Arcy, 12. Shane Horgan, 13. Brian O'Driscoll, 14. Denis Hickie, 15. Girvan Dempsey.; Replacements: Peter McKenna, Mark McHugh, Brian O'Meara, Peter Smyth, Gary Halpin, Leo Cullen, Eric Miller.				Attendance: 4,000

21 October 2000; 15:00	**Northampton Saints (England)**	**8–14**	**(Ireland) Leinster**	Franklin's Gardens
				Attendance: 7,183
Leinster lineup: 1. Reggie Corrigan, 2. Shane Byrne, 3. Emmett Byrne, 4. Bob Casey, 5. Malcolm O'Kelly, 6. Trevor Brennan, 7. Liam Toland, 8. Victor Costello, 9. Brian O'Meara, 10. Eddie Hekenui, 11. Gordon D'Arcy, 12. Shane Horgan, 13. Brian O'Driscoll, 14. Denis Hickie, 15. Girvan Dempsey.; Replacements: Peter Smyth, Gary Halpin, Leo Cullen, Eric Miller.				Attendance: 7,183

27 October 2000; 19:00	**Leinster (Ireland)**	**40–31**	**(England) Northampton Saints**	Donnybrook
				Attendance: 8,500
Leinster lineup: 1. Reggie Corrigan, 2. Shane Byrne, 3. Emmett Byrne, 4. Bob Casey, 5. Malcolm O'Kelly, 6. Eric Miller, 7. Liam Toland, 8. Victor Costello, 9. Brian O'Meara, 10. Eddie Hekenui, 11. Gordon D'Arcy, 12. Shane Horgan, 13. Brian O'Driscoll, 14. Denis Hickie, 15. Girvan Dempsey.; Replacements: Gary Halpin, Peter Smyth, Leo Cullen.				Attendance: 8,500

12 January 2001; 19:00	**Leinster (Ireland)**	**34–34**	**(Scotland) Edinburgh**	Donnybrook
				Attendance: 8,000
Leinster lineup: 1. Reggie Corrigan, 2. Peter Smyth, 3. Emmett Byrne, 4. Bob Casey, 5. Malcolm O'Kelly, 6. Trevor Brennan, 7. Liam Toland, 8. Victor Costello, 9. Brian O'Meara, 10. Eddie Hekenui, 11. Gordon D'Arcy, 12. Shane Horgan, 13. Brian O'Driscoll, 14. Denis Hickie, 15. Girvan Dempsey.; Replacements: Gary Halpin, Shane Byrne, Leo Cullen, Declan O'Brien.				Attendance: 8,000

20 January 2000; 18:30	**Biarritz (France)**	**30–10**	**(Ireland) Leinster**	Parc des Sports Aquil
				Attendance: 10,000
Leinster lineup: 1. Reggie Corrigan, 2. Shane Byrne, 3. Emmett Byrne, 4. Bob Casey, 5. Malcolm O'Kelly, 6. Trevor Brennan, 7. Liam Toland, 8. Victor Costello, 9. Brian O'Meara, 10. Eddie Hekenui, 11. Gordon D'Arcy, 12. Shane Horgan, 13. Brian O'Driscoll, 14. Peter McKenna, 15. Girvan Dempsey.; Replacements: Simon Keogh, Mark McHugh, Kevin Putt, Peter Smyth, Gary Halpin, Leo Cullen, Declan O'Brien.				Attendance: 10,000
