= 2001–02 Celtic League =

1st edition of the Celtic League

- Countries: Ireland (4 teams); Scotland (2 teams); Wales (9 teams)
- Number of teams: 15
- Champions: Leinster (1st title)
- Runners-up: Munster
- Matches played: 56
- Attendance: 252,213 (average 4,504 per match)
- Tries scored: 271 (average 4.8 per match)
- Top point scorer: David Humphreys (Ulster), 122 points
- Top try scorer: Girvan Dempsey (Leinster), 7; Denis Hickie (Leinster), 7

Official website
- www.rabodirectpro12.com

The 2001–02 Celtic League was the inaugural season of the Celtic League. The first season would see fifteen teams compete: the four Irish provinces: Connacht, Leinster, Munster and Ulster; two Scottish teams: Edinburgh Reivers and Glasgow; and all nine Welsh Premier Division teams: Bridgend, Caerphilly, Cardiff, Ebbw Vale, Llanelli, Neath, Newport, Pontypridd and Swansea.

Played alongside each country's own national competitions, the teams were split into two groups (of 8 and 7) and played a series of round-robin matches with each team playing the other only once. The top four teams from each group proceeded into the knock-out phase until a champion was found. Clashes between teams in the 2001–02 Welsh-Scottish League also counted towards the new competition.

The 2001–02 competition was dominated by the Irish teams with all four sides reaching the last eight, three progressing to the semi-finals, and the final played at Lansdowne Road contested between Leinster and Munster with Leinster running out 24–20 winners. Leinster's 10–0 debut 'perfect season' is one of only two in the history of the competition in its various forms. The other, a 17–0 record, was also achieved by Leinster was in 2020.

== Background ==
Wales and Scotland had joined forces for the 1999 and 2000 seasons, with the expansion of the Welsh Premier Division to include Edinburgh and Glasgow to form the Welsh-Scottish League.

In 2001, an agreement was made between the Irish Rugby Football Union (IRFU), Scottish Rugby Union (SRU) and Welsh Rugby Union (WRU) to create a new competition which would bring in the four Irish provinces. 2001 would see the very first incarnation of the Celtic League.

== Teams and personnel ==
=== Overview ===
Country	Team	Stadia information			Coach
Country	Team	Stadia	Capacity	Location	Coach
Ireland	Connacht	The Sportsground	6,129	Galway, County Galway	Steph Nel
Ireland	Leinster	Donnybrook Stadium	6,000	Donnybrook, County Dublin	Matt Williams
Ireland	Munster	Thomond Park	25,600	Limerick, County Limerick	Declan Kidney
Ireland	Munster	Musgrave Park	8,008	Ballyphehane, County Cork	Declan Kidney
Ireland	Ulster	Ravenhill Stadium	18,196	Belfast, Northern Ireland	Alan Solomons
Scotland	Edinburgh	Myreside Stadium	13,799	Edinburgh, Lothian	Frank Hadden
Scotland	Glasgow	Hughenden	6,000	Hyndland, Strathclyde	Richie Dixon
Wales	Bridgend	Brewery Field	8,000	Bridgend, Bridgend County Borough	Dennis John
Wales	Caerphilly	Virginia Park	6,000	Caerphilly, Caerphilly County Borough	Gareth Nicholas
Wales	Cardiff	Cardiff Arms Park	12,125	Cardiff	Rudy Joubert
Wales	Ebbw Vale	Eugene Cross Park	8,000	Blaenau Gwent	Mike Ruddock
Wales	Llanelli	Stradey Park	10,800	Llanelli, Carmarthenshire	Gareth Jenkins
Wales	Neath	The Gnoll	6,000	Neath, Neath Port Talbot	Lyn Jones
Wales	Newport	Rodney Parade	8,700	Newport	Ian McIntosh
Wales	Pontypridd	Sardis Road	7,861	Pontypridd, Rhondda Cynon Taf	Lynn Howells
Wales	Swansea	St Helen's	4,500	Brynmill, Swansea	John Plumtree

=== Locations ===
Location of Irish, Scottish and Welsh teams: 2001–02 Celtic League (the United Kingdom and Ireland)	Location of Welsh teams: 2001–02 Celtic League (Wales)

== Pool stage ==
The teams were split into two pools and the pool stage consisted of a single round-robin; each team played the other teams in its pool once only.

=== Pool A ===
==== Pool A standings ====
Pos	Team	Pld	W	D	L	PF	PA	PD	Pts	Qualification
1	Leinster (C)	7	7	0	0	281	114	+167	21	Advance to knockout stage
2	Ulster	7	4	1	2	194	157	+37	13	Advance to knockout stage
3	Glasgow	7	4	1	2	204	172	+32	13	Advance to knockout stage
4	Llanelli	7	4	0	3	175	123	+52	12	Advance to knockout stage
5	Swansea	7	3	0	4	124	158	−34	9	
6	Bridgend	7	3	0	4	161	208	−47	9	
7	Pontypridd	7	1	0	6	111	207	−96	3	
8	Ebbw Vale	7	1	0	6	134	245	−111	3	

Source: globalrugbyresults.com
(C) Champion

==== Pool A results ====
17 August
19:15

Bridgend	19–27	Pontypridd
	Report

Brewery Field
Attendance: 3,500
Referee: David McHugh (Ireland)

17 August
19:30

Ulster	30–13	Swansea
	Report

Ravenhill Stadium
Attendance: 6,000
Referee: Chris White (England)

17 August
19:35

Leinster	39–11	Glasgow
	Report

Donnybrook Stadium
Attendance: 4,500
Referee: Paul Adams (Wales)

18 August
18:00

Llanelli	46–16	Ebbw Vale
	Report

Stradey Park
Attendance: 3,000
Referee: Alain Rolland (Ireland)

24 August
19:05

Llanelli	17–19	Leinster
	Report

Stradey Park
Attendance: 4,000
Referee: Nigel Whitehouse (Wales)

24 August
19:30

Ebbw Vale	18–13	Pontypridd
	Report

Eugene Cross Park
Attendance: 3,000

24 August
19:30

Glasgow	25–25	Ulster
	Report

Hughenden Stadium
Attendance: 6,095
Referee: Nigel Whitehouse (Wales)

25 August
18:00

Swansea	16–25	Bridgend
	Report

St Helen's
Attendance: 3,250

28 August
19:00

Leinster	55–13	Ebbw Vale
	Report

Donnybrook Stadium
Attendance: 3,200
Referee: John Barnard (England)

28 August
19:00

Ulster	26–27	Llanelli
	Report

Ravenhill Stadium
Attendance: 8,000
Referee: Rob Dickson (Scotland)

28 August
19:15

Pontypridd	6–11	Swansea
	Report

Sardis Road
Attendance: 4,000
Referee: Alan Lewis (Ireland)

29 August
19:00

Bridgend	50–15	Glasgow
	Report

Brewery Field
Attendance: 4,300

31 August
19:30

Glasgow	59–14	Pontypridd
	Report

Hughenden Stadium
Attendance: 4,110
Referee: Alain Rolland (Ireland)

31 August
19:35

Leinster	31–9	Ulster
	Report

Referee: Nigel Williams (Wales)

1 September
14:30

Ebbw Vale	21–26	Swansea
	Report

Eugene Cross Park
Attendance: 3,500
Referee: David Davies (Wales)

1 September
14:30

Llanelli	36–3	Bridgend
	Report

Stradey Park
Attendance: 3,000

7 September
19:05

Ebbw Vale	27–29	Ulster
	Report

Eugene Cross Park
Attendance: 2,000
Referee: Tony Spreadbury (England)

8 September
14:30

Pontypridd	17–19	Llanelli
	Report

Sardis Road
Attendance: 5,000
Referee: Nigel Whitehouse (Wales)

8 September
14:30

Swansea	13–21	Glasgow
	Report

St Helen's
Attendance: 2,500
Referee: Donal Courtney (Ireland)

8 September
19:30

Bridgend	32–51	Leinster
	Report

Brewery Field
Attendance: 2,650
Referee: Steve Lander (England)

11 September
19:00

Leinster	52–14	Pontypridd
	Report

Donnybrook Stadium
Attendance: 3,056
Referee: Rob Dixon (England)

11 September
19:05

Llanelli	21–27	Swansea
	Report

Stradey Park
Attendance: 4,500
Referee: David McHugh (Ireland)

11 September
19:30

Glasgow	58–22	Ebbw Vale
	Report

Hughenden Stadium
Attendance: 2,179
Referee: Olan Trevor (Ireland)

12 September
19:30

Ulster	46–14	Bridgend
	Report

Ravenhill Stadium
Attendance: 8,000
Referee: Alain Rolland (Ireland)

14 September
19:30

Glasgow	15–9	Llanelli
	Report

Hughenden Stadium
Attendance: 5,375
Referee: David Tyndall (Ireland)

15 September
14:30

Ebbw Vale	17–18	Bridgend
	Report

Eugene Cross Park
Attendance: 2,800
Referee: Nigel Williams (Wales)

15 September
14:30

Pontypridd	20–29	Ulster
	Report

Sardis Road
Attendance: 3,200
Referee: Chris White (England)

15 September
14:30

Swansea	18–34	Leinster
	Report

St Helen's
Attendance: 4,000
Referee: Iain Ramage (Scotland)

=== Pool B ===
==== Pool B standings ====
Pos	Team	Pld	W	D	L	PF	PA	PD	Pts	Qualification
1	Munster	6	5	0	1	228	120	+108	15	Advance to knockout stage
2	Connacht	6	4	0	2	152	97	+55	12	Advance to knockout stage
3	Neath	6	4	0	2	151	116	+35	12	Advance to knockout stage
4	Newport	6	3	0	3	147	109	+38	9	Advance to knockout stage
5	Cardiff	6	3	0	3	128	135	−7	9	
6	Edinburgh	6	2	0	4	134	159	−25	6	
7	Caerphilly	6	0	0	6	88	292	−204	0	

Source: globalrugbyresults.com

==== Pool B results ====
17 August
19:30

Edinburgh	22–25	Munster
	Report

Myreside
Attendance: 5,410
Referee: Nigel Williams (Wales)

18 August
14:30

Caerphilly	13–43	Neath
	Report

Virginia Park
Attendance: 3,500
Referee: Tony Spreadbury (England)

18 August
14:30

Cardiff	3–6	Connacht
	Report

Cardiff Arms Park
Attendance: 4,000
Referee: Rob Dickson (Scotland)

24 August
18:15

Connacht	21–30	Edinburgh
	Report

The Sportsground
Attendance: 1,800

24 August
19:00

Neath	25–14	Cardiff
	Report

The Gnoll
Attendance: 5,000

25 August
14:30

Newport	50–22	Caerphilly
	Report

Rodney Parade
Attendance: 6,260

28 August
19:30

Edinburgh	20–32	Neath
	Report

Myreside
Attendance: 3,075
Referee: Donal Courtney (Ireland)

28 August
19:35

Munster	40–19	Connacht
	Report

Thomond Park
Attendance: 6,000
Referee: Paul Adams (Wales)

29 August
19:00

Cardiff	20–14	Newport
	Report

Cardiff Arms Park
Attendance: 7,500
Referee: Steve Lander (England)

31 August
19:05

Neath	30–22	Munster
	Report

The Gnoll
Attendance: 2,250

1 September
14:30

Caerphilly	15–49	Cardiff
	Report

Virginia Park
Attendance: 1,900
Referee: Paul Adams (Wales)

1 September
14:30

Newport	29–11	Edinburgh
	Report

Rodney Parade
Attendance: 6,164
Referee: Olan Trevor (Ireland)

7 September
18:15

Connacht	28–10	Neath
	Report

The Sportsground
Attendance: 550
Referee: Jim Yuille (Scotland)

7 September
19:30

Edinburgh	27–20	Caerphilly
	Report

Myreside
Attendance: 2,648

7 September
19:35

Munster	29–21	Newport
	Report

Musgrave Park
Attendance: 4,560
Referee: Iain Ramage (Scotland)

11 September
19:15

Caerphilly	18–61	Munster
	Report

Virginia Park
Attendance: 1,500

11 September
19:15

Cardiff	32–24	Edinburgh
	Report

Cardiff Arms Park
Attendance: 5,000
Referee: Tony Spreadbury (England)

11 September
19:30

Newport	14–16	Connacht
	Report

Rodney Parade
Attendance: 5,821

15 September
13:30

Munster	51–10	Cardiff
	Report

Musgrave Park
Attendance: 6,055
Referee: Rob Dickson (Scotland)

15 September
17:30

Neath	11–19	Newport
	Report

The Gnoll
Attendance: 3,625
Referee: Gareth Simmons (Wales)

16 September
15:00

Connacht	62–0	Caerphilly
	Report

The Sportsground
Attendance: 455
Referee: Steve Leyshon (England)

== Knockout stage ==
=== Bracket ===
Quarter-finals
30 November – Dublin
Leinster	34
Newport	22
1 December – Galway
Connacht	29
Glasgow	34
1 December – Limerick
Munster	13
Llanelli	6
30 November – Belfast
Ulster	38
Neath	29

Semi-finals
7 December – Dublin
Leinster	35
Glasgow	13
8 December – Dublin
Munster	15
Ulster	9

Final
15 December – Dublin
Leinster	24
Munster	20

=== Quarter-finals ===
30 November
19:05

Ulster	38–29	Neath
	Report

Ravenhill Stadium
Attendance: 12,000

30 November
19:35

Leinster	34–22	Newport
	Report

Donnybrook Stadium
Attendance: 7,300

1 December
14:00

Connacht	29–34	Glasgow
	Report

The Sportsground

1 December
17:30

Munster	13–6	Llanelli
	Report

Thomond Park

=== Semi-finals ===
7 December
19:30

Leinster	35–13	Glasgow
	Report

Lansdowne Road
Attendance: 5,500

8 December
15:00

Munster	15–9	Ulster
	Report

Lansdowne Road
Attendance: 12,500

=== Final ===
15 December
15:00

Leinster	24–20	Munster
	Report

Lansdowne Road
Attendance: 30,000
Referee: Nigel Whitehouse (Wales)

15	Girvan Dempsey
14	Denis Hickie
13	Brian O'Driscoll
12	Shane Horgan
11	Gordon D'Arcy
10	Nathan Spooner
9	Brian O'Meara
8	Victor Costello
7	Keith Gleeson
6	Eric Miller
5	Malcolm O'Kelly
4	Leo Cullen
3	Paul Wallace
2	Shane Byrne
1	Reggie Corrigan (c)
Substitutes:
16	Peter Coyle
17	Gavin Hickie
18	Bob Casey
19	Trevor Brennan
20	Ben Willis
21	Peter McKenna
Coach:
Matt Williams

15	Dominic Crotty
14	Anthony Horgan
13	John Kelly
12	Rob Henderson
11	John O'Neill
10	Ronan O'Gara
9	Mike Prendergast
8	Anthony Foley
7	Alan Quinlan
6	Jim Williams
5	Paul O'Connell
4	Mick Galwey (c)
3	Peter Clohessy
2	Frankie Sheahan
1	Marcus Horan
Substitutes:
16	Martin Cahill
18	Mick O'Driscoll
19	Colm McMahon
21	Jason Holland
22	Mike Mullins
Coach:
Declan Kidney

== Leading scorers ==
Note: Flags to the left of player names indicate national team as has been defined under IRB eligibility rules, or primary nationality for players who have not yet earned international senior caps. Players may hold one or more non-IRB nationalities.

=== Top points scorers ===
Rank	Player	Club	Points
1	(Ireland) David Humphreys	(Ireland) Ulster	122
2	(Cook Islands) Tommy Hayes	(Scotland) Glasgow	111
3	(Wales) Lee Jarvis	(Wales) Neath	100
4	(Australia) Nathan Spooner	(Ireland) Leinster	97
5	(Wales) Stephen Jones	(Wales) Llanelli	89

=== Top try scorers ===
Rank	Player	Club	Tries
1	(Ireland) Girvan Dempsey	(Ireland) Leinster	7
1	(Ireland) Denis Hickie	(Ireland) Leinster	7
3	(New Zealand) Craig Hudson	(Wales) Cardiff	6
3	(Ireland) Wayne Munn	(Ireland) Connacht	6
5	(Ireland) Mike Mullins	(Ireland) Munster	5
