= 2000–01 Connacht Rugby season =

- Ground(s): The Sportsground, Galway
- Coach: Steph Nel
- Top scorer: Eric Elwood (92)
- Most tries: Eric Elwood (2); Darren Yapp (2)
- League(s): Challenge Cup (4th in pool); IRFU Interprovincial Championship (4th)

2001-02 was Connacht's sixth season under professionalism, and their first under head coach Steph Nel, a 33-year-old South African who had previously coached wih the South Western Districts Eagles, the Northern Free State Griffons and Western Province, appointed director of coaching in place of the departing Glenn Ross. They finished bottom of the IRFU Interprovincial Championship, and bottom of their pool in the European Challenge Cup.

== Player transfers ==
=== Players in ===
- (Ireland) Damian Browne from (Ireland) Galwegians
- (New Zealand) Rowan Frost
- (Ireland) Robbie Lee from (Ireland) Buccaneers
- (England) Dan McFarland from (France) Stade Français Paris
- (Ireland) Johnny O'Connor
- (Ireland) Willie Ruane (re-contracted)
- (Ireland) Denver Rumney
- (South Africa) Gavin Schoeman
- (Ireland) Bryan Shelbourne
- (Ireland) Mick Smyth (from Terenure)
- (England) Michael Swift from (England) Leeds Tykes
- (South Africa) Marnus Uijs

=== Players out ===
- (Ireland) Mel Deane to (England) Sale Sharks
- (Ireland) Bernard Jackman to (England) Sale Sharks
- (Ireland) Matt Mostyn to (Wales) Newport
- (Ireland) Ultan O'Callaghan
- (Ireland) Gavin Webster to (England) Worcester Warriors

== Squad ==
Connacht Rugby squad
**Props**: (Ireland) Martin Cahill; (England) Dan McFarland*; (Ireland) Jimmy Screene; **Hookers**: (Ireland) Paul Cleary; (Ireland) Joe McVeigh; (South Africa) Marnus Uijs; **Locks**: (Ireland) Damian Browne; (New Zealand) Rowan Frost; (New Zealand) Mark McConnell	**Back row**: (New Zealand) Junior Charlie; (Ireland) Ian Dillon; (Ireland) Johnny O'Connor; (Ireland) Colm Rigney; (South Africa) Gavin Schoeman; (Ireland) Michael Swift; **Scrum-halves**: (Ireland) James Ferris; (Ireland) **Stephen McIvor**; (Ireland) Bryan Shelbourne; **Fly-halves**: (Ireland) **Eric Elwood**	**Centres**: (New Zealand) Tim Allnutt; (Ireland) Mervyn Murphy; (Ireland) Mick Smyth; (Ireland) Shane Stephens; **Wings**: (Ireland) Nigel Carolan; (Ireland) **Pat Duignan**; (Ireland) Denver Rumney; (Ireland) Darren Yapp; **Fullbacks**: (Ireland) Robbie Lee; (Ireland) Wayne Munn; (Ireland) Willie Ruane
(c) denotes the team captain, **Bold** denotes internationally capped players.^{*} denotes players qualified to play for Ireland on residency or dual nationality.

== IRFU Interprovincial Championship ==
Team	P	W	D	L	F	A	BP	Pts	Status
Munster	6	5	1	0	151	99	1	23	Champions; qualified for 2001–02 Heineken Cup
Ulster	6	3	0	3	144	119	3	15	Qualified for 2001–02 Heineken Cup
Leinster	6	2	1	3	109	111	2	12	Qualified for 2001–02 Heineken Cup
Connacht	6	1	0	5	100	175	1	5	Qualified for 2001–02 European Challenge Cup

2 September 2000	**Leinster**	**21-15**	**Connacht**	Donnybrook Stadium
	Try: Costello; Smyth; Hickie; Pen: Dempsey (2); Cards: Miller (yellow card); Casey	Report	Pen: Elwood (5); Cards: Uijs (yellow card); McConnell (red card)
Connacht lineup: 1. Jimmy Screene, 2. Marnus Uijs, 3. Martin Cahill, 4. Mark McConnell (c), 5. Damian Browne, 6. Ian Dillon, 7. Junior Charlie, Johnny O'Connor, 9. James Ferris, 10. Eric Elwood, 11. Denver Rumney, 12. Mervyn Murphy, 13. Michael Smyth, 14. Pat Duignan, 15. Willie Ruane.; Replacements: Colm Rigney (for Rumney 59'), Michael Swift (for Dillon 65'), Stephen McIvor (for Ferris 69').

8 September 2000	**Connacht**	**15-39**	**Ulster**	Galway Sportsgrounds
	Try: Lee; Elwood; Con: Elwood; Pen: Elwood	Report	Try: Nelson; Johns; J. Bell; J. Topping; Stewart; Con: Humphreys (4); Pen: Humphreys (3)
Connacht lineup: 1. Jimmy Screene, 2. Marnus Uijs, 3. Martin Cahill, 4. Colm Rigney, 5. Damian Browne, 6. Ian Dillon, 7. Junior Charlie, 8. Johnny O'Connor, 9. Stephen McIvor, 10. Eric Elwood, 11. Denver Rumney, 12. Mervyn Murphy (c), 13. Mick Smyth, 14. Pat Duignan, 15. Willie Ruane.; Replacements: Dan McFarland (for Screene 43'), Robbie Lee (for Rumney 49'), Bryan Shelbourne (for McIvor 49'), Tim Allnutt (for Mervyn Murphy 55'), Michael Swift (for Dillon 56'), Joe McVeigh (for Uijs 56').

15 September 2000	**Munster (Ireland)**	**36–13**	**(Ireland) Connacht**	Thomond Park
	Try: Crotty; Wallace; McMahon; Mullins; Foley; Con: O'Gara (2); Staunton (2); Pen: Staunton	Report	Try: Charlie; Con: Elwood; Pen: Elwood (2)
Connacht lineup: 1. Dan McFarland, 2. Marnus Uijs, 3. Jimmy Screene, 4. Colm Rigney, 5. Damian Browne, 6. Ian Dillon, 7. Junior Charlie (c), 8. Johnny O'Connor, 9. Bryan Shelbourne, 10. Eric Elwood, 11. Nigel Carolan, 12. Tim Allnutt, 13. Mick Smyth, 14. Pat Duignan, 15. Willie Ruane.; Replacements: Rowan Frost (for Rigney 27'), Robbie Lee (for Ruane 47'), Martin Cahill (for Screene 47'), Joe McVeigh (for Uijs 63'), Michael Swift (for O'Connor 63').

23 September 2000	**Connacht**	**13–23**	**Munster**	Galway Sportsgrounds
	Try: Elwood; Con: Elwood; Pen: Elwood (2)	Report	Try: Holland; Pen: Staunton (6)
Connacht lineup: 1. Dan McFarland, 2. Marnus Uijs, 3. Jimmy Screene, 4. Rowan Frost, 5. Damian Browne, 6. Junior Charlie (c), 7. Colm Rigney, 8. Johnny O'Connor, 9. Bryan Shelbourne, 10. Eric Elwood, 11. Nigel Carolan, 12. Tim Allnutt, 13. Shane Stephens, 14. Pat Duignan, 15. Robbie Lee.; Replacements: Willie Ruane (for Lee 40'), James Ferris (for Shelbourne 68'), Joe McVeigh (for Uijs 48'), Martin Cahill (for Screene 68'), Gavin Schoeman (for Charlie 48').

29 September 2000	**Connacht**	**22-20**	**Leinster**	Galway Sportsgrounds
	Try: Browne; Duignan; Pen: Elwood (4)	Report	Try: Cullen; Pen: McHugh (4); Drop: McKenna
Connacht lineup: 1. Dan McFarland, 2. Marnus Uijs, 3. Jimmy Screene, 4. Rowan Frost, 5. Damian Browne, 6. Junior Charlie (c), 7. Colm Rigney, 8. Johnny O'Connor, 9. Bryan Shelbourne, 10. Eric Elwood, 11. Nigel Carolan, 12. Tim Allnutt, 13. Shane Stephens, 14. Pat Duignan, 15. Wayne Munn.; Replacements: Mick Smyth (for Stephens 65'), Joe McVeigh (for Uijs 71'), Martin Cahill (for Screene 60'), Michael Swift (for Charlie 77'), Gavin Schoeman (for Rigney 63').

3 November 2000	**Ulster**	**36-22**	**Connacht**	Ravenhill
	Try: J. Topping; Blair (2); Humphreys; Ward; Con: Humphreys (4); Pen: Humphreys	Report	Try: O'Connor; Munn; Schoemann; Con: Munn (2); Pen: Munn
Connacht lineup: 1. Jimmy Screene, 2. Marnus Uijs, 3. Martin Cahill, 4. Rowan Frost, 5. Damian Browne, 6. Ian Dillon, 7. Junior Charlie, 8. Johnny O'Connor, 9. James Ferris, 10. Tim Allnutt, 11. Darren Yapp, 12. Mervyn Murphy, 13. Shane Stephens, 14. Pat Duignan, 15. Wayne Munn.; Replacements: Mick Smyth (for Murphy 72'), Gavin Schoeman (for for Dillon 10-34', for Allnutt 67'), Bryan Shelbourne (for Ferris 66'), Dan McFarland (for Screene 58'), Joe McVeigh (for Uijs 70')

== European Challenge Cup ==
=== Pool 2 ===
Team	P	W	D	L	Tries for	Tries against	Try diff	Points for	Points against	Points diff	Pts
(France) **Béziers**	6	5	0	1	14	10	4	151	112	39	**10**
(France) Montferrand	6	4	0	2	23	9	14	201	107	94	**8**
(Wales) Neath	6	2	0	4	16	23	−7	151	192	−41	**4**
(Ireland) Connacht	6	1	0	5	4	15	−11	60	152	−92	**2**

7 October 2000	**Connacht (Ireland)**	**14 – 16**	**(France) Béziers**	The Sports Ground
13:00	Try: Uijs; Pen: Elwood (3)	Report	Try: Hill; Con: Dourthe; Pen: Dourthe (3)	Attendance: 500
Connacht lineup: 1. Dan McFarland, 2. Marnus Uijs, 3. Jimmy Screene, 4. Rowan Frost, 5. Damian Browne, 6. Junior Charlie, 7. Johnny O'Connor, 8. Colm Rigney, 9. Bryan Shelbourne, 10. Eric Elwood, 11. Nigel Carolan, 12. Tim Allnutt, 13. Mick Smyth, 14. Pat Duignan, 15. Wayne Munn.; Replacements: James Ferris, Joe McVeigh, Martin Cahill, Michael Swift, Gavin Schoeman.				Attendance: 500

14 October 2000	**Neath (Wales)**	**45 – 0**	**(Ireland) Connacht**	The Gnoll
14:30		Report		Attendance: 1,500
Connacht lineup: 1. Jimmy Screene, 2. Marnus Uijs, 3. Martin Cahill, 4. Rowan Frost, 5. Damian Browne, 6. Junior Charlie, 7. Ian Dillon, 8. Gavin Schoeman, 9. Bryan Shelbourne, 10. Eric Elwood, 11. Darren Yapp, 12. Tim Allnutt, 13. Mick Smyth, 14. Pat Duignan, 15. Wayne Munn.; Replacements: Robert Lee, James Ferris, Dan McFarland, Joe McVeigh, Colm Rigney, Johnny O'Connor.				Attendance: 1,500

22 October 2000	**Montferrand (France)**	**58 – 21**	**(Ireland) Connacht**	Stade Marcel Michelin
15:00	Try: Audebert (2); Rougerie; Bory (2); Macháček; Dalzell; Con: Nicol (3); Merceron (4); Pen: Nicol (2)	Report	Try: Frost; Yapp; Con: Elwood; Pen: Elwood (3)
Connacht lineup: 1. Jimmy Screene, 2. Joe McVeigh, 3. Martin Cahill, 4. Rowan Frost, 5. Mark McConnell, 6. Ian Dillon, 7. Colm Rigney, 8. Johnny O'Connor, 9. Bryan Shelbourne, 10. Eric Elwood, 11. Darren Yapp, 12. Tim Allnutt, 13. Shane Stephens, 14. Pat Duignan, 15. Robert Lee.; Replacements: Mick Smyth (for Yapp 49'), Damian Browne (for McConnell 65'), Gavin Schoeman (for O'Connor 66')

28 October 2000	**Connacht (Ireland)**	**3 – 12**	**(France) Montferrand**	Ericsson Park, Athlone
15:00	Pen: Elwood	Report	Pen: Merceron (4)	Attendance: 1,000
Connacht lineup: 1. Jimmy Screene, 2. Joe McVeigh, 3. Martin Cahill, 4. Rowan Frost, 5. Mark McConnell, 6. Ian Dillon, 7. Johnny O'Connor, 8. Junior Charlie, 9. James Ferris, 10. Eric Elwood, 11. Darren Yapp, 12. Tim Allnutt, 13. Shane Stephens, 14. Pat Duignan, 15. Robert Lee.; Replacements: Wayne Munn, Dan McFarland, Paul Cleary.				Attendance: 1,000

13 January 2001	**Béziers (France)**	**10 – 9**	**(Ireland) Connacht**	Stade de la Méditerranée
17:00	Try: Noel; Con: Labit; Pen: Labit	Report	Pen: Elwood
Connacht lineup: 1. Dan McFarland, 2. Joe McVeigh, 3. Martin Cahill, 4. Rowan Frost, 5. Mark McConnell, 6. Junior Charlie, 7. Johnny O'Connor, 8. Michael Swift, 9. James Ferris, 10. Eric Elwood, 11. Darren Yapp, 12. Tim Allnutt, 13. Pat Duignan, 14. Denver Rumney, 15. Shane Stephens.; Replacements: Mervyn Murphy, Bryan Shelbourne, Jimmy Screene, Damian Browne, Ian Dillon, Colm Rigney.

20 January 2001	**Connacht (Ireland)**	**13 – 11**	**(Wales) Neath**	The Sports Ground
15:00	Try: Yapp; Con: Elwood; Pen: Elwood (2)	Report	Try: Millward; Pen: Williams; Horgan	Attendance: 700
Connacht lineup: 1. Dan McFarland, 2. Joe McVeigh, 3. Martin Cahill, 4. Rowan Frost, 5. Mark McConnell, 6. Junior Charlie, 7. Johnny O'Connor, 8. Michael Swift, 9. James Ferris, 10. Eric Elwood, 11. Darren Yapp, 12. Tim Allnutt, 13. Pat Duignan, 14. Denver Rumney, 15. Wayne Munn.; Replacements: Bryan Shelbourne (for Ferris 52'), Ian Dillon (for Charlie 52'), Colm Rigney (for Swift 67'), Mervyn Murphy (for Yapp 75').				Attendance: 700
