= 2001–02 Munster Rugby season =

- Ground(s): Thomond Park (Capacity: 13,200); Musgrave Park (Capacity: 8,300)
- CEO: Garrett Fitzgerald
- Coach: Declan Kidney
- Captain: Mick Galwey
- League: Celtic League
- 2001–02: 1st (Pool B), Runners-up

The 2001–02 Munster Rugby season was Munster's first season competing in the Celtic League, alongside which they also competed in the Heineken Cup. It was Declan Kidney's fourth season in his first spell as head coach of the province.

== 2001–02 squad ==
Note: Flags indicate national union under World Rugby eligibility rules. Players may hold more than one non-World Rugby nationality.

Player	Position	Union
James Blaney	Hooker	Ireland
John Fogarty	Hooker	Ireland
Frankie Sheahan	Hooker	Ireland
Martin Cahill	Prop	Ireland
Peter Clohessy	Prop	Ireland
John Hayes	Prop	Ireland
Marcus Horan	Prop	Ireland
Mick Galwey (c)	Lock	Ireland
Donncha O'Callaghan	Lock	Ireland
Paul O'Connell	Lock	Ireland
Mick O'Driscoll	Lock	Ireland
David Bowles	Back row	Ireland
Anthony Foley	Back row	Ireland
Eddie Halvey	Back row	Ireland
Colm McMahon	Back row	Ireland
Alan Quinlan	Back row	Ireland
David Wallace	Back row	Ireland
Jim Williams	Back row	Australia

Player	Position	Union
Derek Hegarty	Scrum-half	Ireland
Frank Murphy	Scrum-half	Ireland
Mike Prendergast	Scrum-half	Ireland
Peter Stringer	Scrum-half	Ireland
Ronan O'Gara	Fly-half	Ireland
Jeremy Staunton	Fly-half	Ireland
Rob Henderson	Centre	Ireland
Jason Holland	Centre	Ireland
Killian Keane	Centre	Ireland
Mike Mullins	Centre	Ireland
Anthony Horgan	Wing	Ireland
John Kelly	Wing	Ireland
Mossy Lawler	Wing	Ireland
John O'Neill	Wing	Ireland
Dominic Crotty	Fullback	Ireland

== 2001–02 Celtic League ==
=== Pool B Table ===
	Team	Pld	W	D	L	PF	PA	PD	TF	TA	Pts
1	(Ireland) Munster	6	5	0	1	228	120	+108	23	9	15
2	(Ireland) Connacht	6	4	0	2	152	97	+55	16	8	12
3	(Wales) Neath	6	4	0	2	151	116	+35	14	10	12
4	(Wales) Newport	6	3	0	3	147	109	+38	15	10	9
5	(Wales) Cardiff	6	3	0	3	128	135	−7	15	15	9
6	(Scotland) Edinburgh	6	2	0	4	134	159	−25	11	16	6
7	(Wales) Caerphilly	6	0	0	6	88	292	−204	11	37	0
Match points were awarded as follows: 3 points for a win; 1 point for a draw
Green background (rows 1 to 4) qualify for the knock-out stage. Source: RaboDirect PRO12

17 August 2001
19:30

Edinburgh (Scotland)	22–25	(Ireland) Munster
	Report

Myreside
Attendance: 5,410

28 August 2001
19:35

Munster (Ireland)	40–19	(Ireland) Connacht
Try: Staunton; O'Neill; Horan; Con: Staunton (2); Pen: Staunton (7)	Report	Try: E. Reddan; Con: Elwood; Pen: Elwood (4)

Thomond Park
Attendance: 6,000

31 August 2001
19:05

Neath (Wales)	30–22	(Ireland) Munster
	Report

The Gnoll
Attendance: 2,250

7 September 2001
19:35

Munster (Ireland)	29–21	(Wales) Newport
	Report

Musgrave Park
Attendance: 4,560

11 September 2001
19:15

Caerphilly (Wales)	18–61	(Ireland) Munster
	Report

Virginia Park
Attendance: 1,500

15 September 2001
13:30

Munster (Ireland)	51–10	(Wales) Cardiff
	Report

Musgrave Park
Attendance: 6,055

=== Quarter-final ===
1 December 2001
17:30

Munster (Ireland)	13–6	(Wales) Llanelli
	Report

Musgrave Park

=== Semi-final ===
8 December 2001
15:00

Munster (Ireland)	15–9	(Ireland) Ulster
Pen: O'Gara (5)	Report	Pen: Humphreys (3)

Lansdowne Road
Attendance: 12,500
Referee: I. Ramage

=== Final ===
15 December 2001
15:00

Leinster (Ireland)	24–20	(Ireland) Munster
	Report

Lansdowne Road
Attendance: 30,000
Referee: Nigel Whitehouse

== 2001–02 IRFU Interprovincial Championship ==
Team	P	W	D	L	F	A	BP	Pts	Status
Leinster	3	2	0	1	86	35	2	12	Champions; qualified for next season's Heineken Cup
Ulster	3	2	0	1	50	66	0	8	Qualified for next season's Heineken Cup
Munster	3	1	1	1	64	48	1	7	Qualified for next season's Heineken Cup
Connacht	3	0	0	3	56	107	1	1	

Celtic League pool matches between Irish provinces count towards the Interprovincial Championship.

19 April 2002

Munster (Ireland)	6–6	(Ireland) Leinster
Pen: O'Gara; Holland	Report	Pen: Spooner (2)

Musgrave Park

12 May 2002

Ulster (Ireland)	23–18	(Ireland) Munster
Try: Wallace; Doak; Con: Wallace (2); Pen: Wallace (2); Drop: Wallace	Report	Try: O'Connell; Stringer; Con: O'Gara; Pen: O'Gara (2)

Ravenhill
Referee: Alan Lewis

== 2001–02 Heineken Cup ==
=== Pool 4 ===
Team	P	W	D	L	Tries for	Tries against	Try diff	Points for	Points against	Points diff	Pts
(France) Castres Olympique	6	5	0	1	19	12	7	179	125	54	10
(Ireland) Munster	6	5	0	1	17	6	11	172	87	85	10
(England) Harlequins	6	2	0	4	14	20	−6	119	187	−68	4
(Wales) Bridgend	6	0	0	6	11	23	−12	116	187	−71	0

29 September 2001
15:00

Munster (Ireland)	28–23	(France) Castres
	Report

Thomond Park
Attendance: 10,500
Referee: Chris White

6 October 2001
17:00

Harlequins (England)	8–24	(Ireland) Munster
	Report

Twickenham Stoop
Attendance: 9,000
Referee: Nigel Whitehouse

26 October 2001
19:05

Bridgend (Wales)	12–16	(Ireland) Munster
	Report

Brewery Field
Attendance: 4,500
Referee: Antonio Lombardi

3 November 2001
15:00

Munster (Ireland)	40–6	(Wales) Bridgend
	Report

Musgrave Park
Attendance: 8,500
Referee: Didier Mene

5 January 2002
15:00

Munster (Ireland)	51–17	(England) Harlequins
	Report

Thomond Park
Attendance: 14,000
Referee: Stefano Mancini

12 January 2002
15:00

Castres (France)	21–13	(Ireland) Munster
	Report

Stade Pierre-Antoine
Attendance: 9,500

=== Quarter-final ===
26 January 2002
16:15

Stade Français (France)	14–16	(Ireland) Munster
	Report

Stade Jean-Bouin
Attendance: 12,000

=== Semi-final ===
27 April 2002
15:00

Castres (France)	17–25	(Ireland) Munster
	Report

Stade de la Méditerranée
Attendance: 20,400

=== Final ===
25 May 2002
15:00

Leicester Tigers (England)	15–9	(Ireland) Munster
	Report

Millennium Stadium
Attendance: 74,600
Referee: Joël Jutge

== Friendlies ==
8 August 2001

Ulster (Ireland)	51-24	(Ireland) Munster
Try: Humphreys; Constable (2); Doak; Larkin; Howe; Con: Humphreys (6); Pen: Humphreys (3)		Try: Horan; Staunton; Con: Staunton; Pen: Staunton (3); Holland

Ravenhill
