= Rugby Players Ireland =

Rugby Players Ireland representative body

- Rugby Players Ireland
- Rugby Players Ireland logo
- Founded: 2001; 25 years ago
- Headquarters: Clonskeagh, Dublin
- Location: Ireland
- Key people: Peter O'Mahony (President/Chairman)
- Website: www.rugbyplayersireland.ie

The Rugby Players Ireland is the representative body for professional rugby players in Ireland. Founded in October 2001, its aims are to promote and protect the welfare of professional rugby players in Ireland. The Chief Executive Officer is Simon Keogh and Peter O'Mahony is its current President. Its headquarters are in Clonskeagh in Dublin.

== Objectives ==
The associations objectives are:-

- To promote and protect the welfare of its members, both during and after their careers.
- To cater for the educational and welfare needs of its members, to ensure that they have sufficient preparation for the life after rugby.
- To work in partnership with the IRFU to further the cause of Rugby Union in Ireland.
- To be the representative mouthpiece for professional rugby players on issues of importance to the game.

== Services ==
Rugby Players Ireland provides a Player Development Manager (PDM). The five pillars of Rugby Players Ireland's Player Development Programme are

- 1) Education, Training & Skills.
- 2) Social Engagement.
- 3) Financial Management & Planning.
- 4) Player Wellbeing and
- 5) Career Advice & Guidance.

Each PDM works closely with the players on an individual level to prepare them for the transition to life after professional rugby.

The association also acts as a negotiator between players and their employer. They are involved with negotiating group contracts in areas such as match and win bonuses and act as a go-between in the event of disputes. In 2018, the remit of Rugby Players Ireland was extended to include the Irish 7s programme in addition to international women's players. This includes bringing industrial action if necessary.

== History ==
In October 2001 Ireland's professional rugby players set up the Irish Rugby Union Players' Association. Over 95% of all players with a contract with the IRFU joined the new body. Liam Toland and Peter McKenna were appointed Chairman and Secretary.

In 2003, the members of the association realised the need for a full-time employee and former Ireland International Niall Woods was appointed the first full-time Chief Executive Officer.

In 2013, Rob Kearney would be elected as Chairman. Kearney would remain in the position until 2021 when he stepped down as Chairman.

On 12 April 2017, the organization changed its name from the Irish Rugby Union Players Association (IRUPA) to Rugby Players Ireland.

== Executive Board ==
- President/Chairman: Peter O'Mahony
- Chief Executive Officer: Simon Keogh
- Women's Rugby Rep: Enya Breen
- Men's 7s Rep: Billy Dardis
- Women's 7s Rep: Amee-Leigh Costigan
- Connacht Rugby Rep: Dave Heffernan
- Leinster Rugby Rep: Garry Ringrose
- Ulster Rugby Rep: Iain Henderson
- Non-Executive Director: Maura Quinn
- Non-Executive Director: Peter McKenna
- Non-Executive Director: Ciarán Medlar

== Awards ==
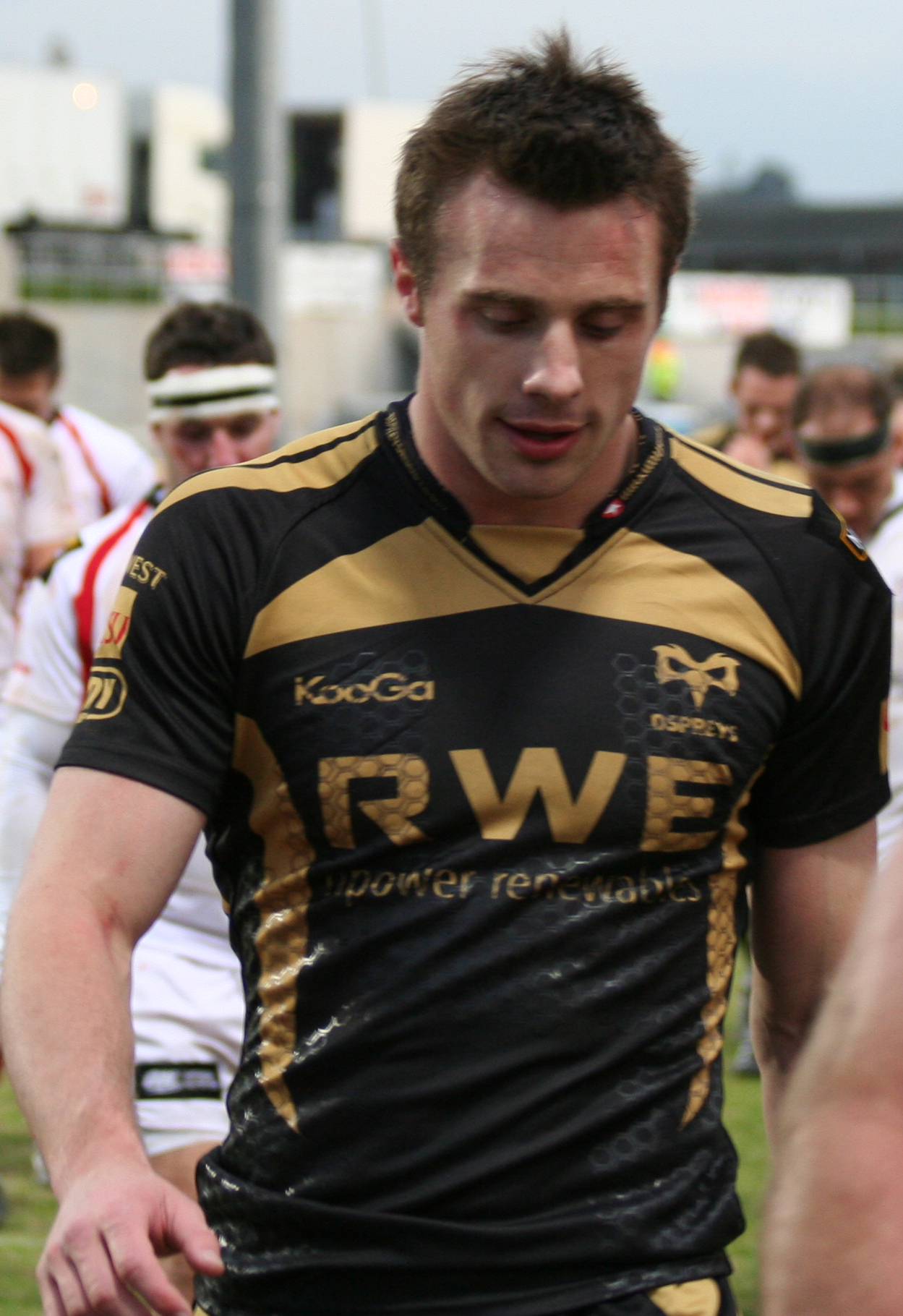
2008 and 2010 IRUPA Players player of the year; Tommy Bowe

Rugby Players Ireland has run the annual Rugby Players Ireland Awards dinner from 2002 which gives recognition to rugby players in a number of categories. The awards dinner is run to support the Rugby Players Ireland Foundation. The most prestigious award is the Players' Player of the Year award which is voted for by playing members of Rugby Players Ireland.

=== Men's Players' Player of the Year ===
Year	Player	Team
2003	Malcolm O'Kelly	Leinster
2004	Gordon D'Arcy	Leinster
2005	Johnny O'Connor	London Wasps
2006	Paul O'Connell	Munster
2007	Gordon D'Arcy	Leinster
2008	Tommy Bowe	Ulster
2009	Brian O'Driscoll	Leinster
2010	Tommy Bowe^{*}	Ospreys
2011	Isa Nacewa	Leinster
2012	Rob Kearney	Leinster
2013	Nick Williams	Ulster
2014	Andrew Trimble	Ulster
2015	Paul O'Connell	Munster
2016	CJ Stander	Munster
2017	Conor Murray	Munster
2018	Keith Earls	Munster
2019	James Ryan	Leinster
2020	Garry Ringrose	Leinster
2021	Robbie Henshaw	Leinster
2022	Josh van der Flier	Leinster
2023	Caelan Doris	Leinster
2024	Bundee Aki	Connacht
2025	Tadhg Beirne	Munster
2026	Stuart McCloskey	Ulster

* Tommy Bowe was also awarded the 2010 WRPA Players' Player of the Year Award.

=== Men's Young Player of the Year ===
Year	Player	Team
2003	Neil McMillan	Ulster
2004	Tommy Bowe	Ulster
2005	David Holwell	Leinster
2006	Andrew Trimble	Ulster
2007	Luke Fitzgerald	Leinster
2008	Cian Healy	Leinster
2009	Keith Earls	Munster
2010	Fionn Carr	Connacht
2011	Nevin Spence	Ulster
2012	Peter O'Mahony	Munster
2013	Robbie Henshaw	Connacht
2014	Robbie Henshaw	Connacht
2015	Robbie Henshaw	Connacht
2016	Josh van der Flier	Leinster
2017	Garry Ringrose	Leinster
2018	Jacob Stockdale	Ulster
2019	James Ryan	Leinster
2020	Caelan Doris	Leinster
2021	Gavin Coombes	Munster
2022	Cian Prendergast	Connacht
2023	Jack Crowley	Munster
2024	Joe McCarthy	Leinster
2025	Sam Prendergast	Leinster
2026	Bryn Ward	Ulster

=== Unsung hero ===
Year	Player	Team
2003	Jason Holland	Munster
2004	Mike Mullins	Munster
2005	Shane Jennings	Leinster
2006	Neil Best	Ulster
2007	Stephen Keogh	Leinster
2008	Andrew Dunne	Connacht
2009	Stan Wright	Leinster
2010	John Fogarty	Leinster
2011	Richardt Strauss	Leinster
2012	Kevin McLaughlin	Leinster
2013	Billy Holland	Munster
2014	James Coughlan	Munster
2015	Darragh Fanning	Leinster

=== Men's Try of the Year ===
Year	Player	Team
2003	Gordon D'Arcy	Leinster v. Swansea
2004	Girvan Dempsey	Ireland v. England
2005	Kieran Campbell	Ulster
2006	Shane Horgan	Leinster
2007	Shane Horgan	Ireland v. England
2008	Rob Kearney	Ireland v. Scotland
2009	Jamie Heaslip	Ireland v. France
2010	Andrew Trimble	Ulster v Bath
2011	Fionn Carr	Connacht v. Scarlets
2012	Craig Gilroy	Ulster v. Munster
2013	Craig Gilroy	Ireland v Argentina
2014	Rob Kearney	Ireland v. New Zealand
2015	Robbie Henshaw	Ireland v. England
2016	Jamie Heaslip	Ireland v. Italy
2017	Robbie Henshaw	Ireland v. New Zealand
2018	C. J. Stander	Ireland v England
2019	Jacob Stockdale	Ireland v. New Zealand
2020	Andrew Conway	Munster v. Ospreys
2021	JJ Hanrahan	Munster v. Cardiff
2022	Caelan Doris	Ireland v. New Zealand
2023	Mack Hansen	Ireland v. South Africa
2024	Craig Casey	Munster v. Leinster
2025	Dan Sheehan	Ireland v. England
2026	Robert Baloucoune	Ireland v. Italy

=== Men's Sevens Player of the Year ===
Year	Player
2019	Jordan Conroy
2020	Jordan Conroy
2021	Terry Kennedy
2022	Terry Kennedy
2023	Andrew Smith
2024	Zac Ward
2025	Dylan O'Grady

=== Womens Players' Player of the Year ===
Year	Player	Team
2016	Sene Naoupu	Harlequins Ladies
2017	Lindsay Peat	Leinster
2018	Claire Molloy	Bristol
2019	Ciara Griffin	Munster
2020	Cliodhna Moloney	Wasps
2021	Dorothy Wall	Blackrock College RFC
2022	Sam Monaghan	Gloucester-Hartpury
2023	Nichola Fryday	Exeter Chiefs
2024	Aoife Wafer	Leinster
2025	Aoife Dalton	Leinster
2026	Cliodhna Moloney-McDonald	Exeter Chiefs

=== Women's Young Player of the Year ===
Year	Player	Team
2021	Dorothy Wall	Blackrock College RFC
2022	Eve Higgins	Leinster
2023	Aoife Dalton	Old Belvedere R.F.C.
2024	Aoife Wafer	Leinster
2025	Erin King	Leinster
2026	Robyn O'Connor	Leinster

=== Women's Try of the Year ===
Year	Player	Team
2022	Eve Higgins	Ireland v. France
2023	Nichola Fryday	Ireland v. Scotland
2024	Katie Corrigan	Ireland v. Italy
2025	Anna McGann	Ireland v. Italy
2026	Eve Higgins	Ireland v. Japan

=== Women's Sevens Player of the Year ===
Year	Player
2014	Nicole Cronin
2015	Lucy Mulhall
2016	Amee-Leigh Murphy Crowe
2017	Amee-Leigh Murphy Crowe
2018	Lucy Mulhall
2019	Louise Galvin
2020	Louise Galvin
2021	Lucy Mulhall
2022	Amee-Leigh Murphy Crowe
2023	Lucy Mulhall
2024	Megan Burns
2025	Lucinda Kinghan
2026	Megan Burns

=== List of Hall of Fame inductees ===
The Rugby Players Ireland Hall of Fame includes the following members:

Year	Inductee(s)
2003	Mick Galwey & Peter Clohessy
2004	Keith Wood & Paddy Johns
2005	Eric Elwood
2006	Jeremy Davidson
2007	Victor Costello
2008	David Humphreys
2009	Anthony Foley
2010	Girvan Dempsey
2011	Malcolm O'Kelly
2012	John Hayes
2013	Denis Hickie
2014	Simon Best
2015	David Wallace
2016	Ronan O'Gara
2017	Geordan Murphy
2018	Brian O'Driscoll
2019	Conor O'Shea
2020	Gordon D'Arcy
2021	Not Awarded
2022	Tommy Bowe & Fiona Coghlan
2023	Shane Horgan & Alison Miller
2024	Donnacha O'Callaghan & Marcus Horan & Lynne Cantwell
2025	Jamie Heaslip & Stephen Ferris & Claire Molloy
2026	Rory Best, Niamh Briggs, John Muldoon

== Rugby Players Ireland Foundation ==
Rugby Players Ireland administers the injured players fund which provides support to players who are forced to retire from rugby due to illness or injury. The fund is reliant on individual and corporate donations. The Rugby Players Ireland annual awards dinner is also a major part of its fundraising activity. Following the 2010 Haiti earthquake, Rugby Players Ireland made a donation of €20,000 from the injured players fund to assist with relief efforts through aid agency Concern.

== See also ==
- Rugby Players' Association (England)
- Rugby Union Players' Association (Australia)
- Welsh Rugby Players Association
