= 2000–01 Premiership Rugby =

Rugby union competition in England

2000–01 Zurich Premiership
- Countries: England
- Date: 19 August 2000 – 13 May 2001
- Champions: Leicester Tigers (5th title)
- Runners-up: London Wasps
- Relegated: Rotherham Titans
- Matches played: 139
- Attendance: 898,438 (average 6,464 per match)
- Highest attendance: 33,500 – Leicester v Bath (13 May 2001)
- Lowest attendance: 1,800 – Rotherham v Newcastle (10 April 2001)
- Top point scorer: 282 – Kenny Logan (Wasps)
- Top try scorer: 12 – Paul Sampson (Wasps)

The 2000–01 English Premiership was the fourteenth season of the top flight of the English domestic rugby union competitions, and first to be sponsored by Zurich Insurance having been sponsored for the last three seasons by Allied Dunbar. It also heralded a restructuring the English league system, with the first tier Premiership 1 being renamed as the Premiership and second tier Premiership 2 becoming National Division 1.

Leicester Tigers finished top of the league for the third year in a row giving them their fifth English champions title.

This season saw the introduction of the bonus points scoring system.

Additionally, an 8 team end of season knock-out competition, the Zurich Championship was introduced, although this was not used to determine the English Champions, that being the preserve of the Zurich Premiership winners. Leicester also won the Zurich Championship in this season.

Rotherham were relegated, to be replaced by Leeds Tykes for the 2001–02 season.

== Participating teams ==
Locations of the 2000-01 Zurich Premiership teams

Team	Stadium	Capacity	City/Area	Previous season
Bath	Recreation Ground	8,500	Bath, Somerset	2nd
Bristol	Memorial Stadium	8,500 (1,200 seats)	Bristol	6th
Gloucester	Kingsholm	12,000	Gloucester, Gloucestershire	3rd
Harlequins	The Stoop	9,000 (2,000 seats)	Twickenham, London	10th
Leicester Tigers	Welford Road	17,000	Leicester, Leicestershire	Champions
London Irish	Madejski Stadium (Note: London Irish would groundshare with football side Reading for the 2000–01 season having spent the previous season at Harlequins home ground The Stoop.)	24,161	Reading, Berkshire	8th
London Wasps	Loftus Road	18,439	Shepherd's Bush, London	7th
Newcastle Falcons	Kingston Park	8,000	Newcastle upon Tyne, Tyne and Wear	9th
Northampton Saints	Franklin's Gardens	10,000	Northampton, Northamptonshire	5th
Rotherham Titans	Clifton Lane	4,000 (Note: Clifton Lane capacity up to 4,000 for the 2000–01 season with temporary stands added. A capacity attendance was achieved against Leicester Tigers on 23 December 2000.)	Rotherham, South Yorkshire	Promoted from Premiership 2
Sale Sharks	Heywood Road	4,800	Sale, Greater Manchester	11th
Saracens	Vicarage Road	22,000	Watford, Hertfordshire	4th

== Table ==
Pos	Team	Pld	W	D	L	PF	PA	PD	TF	TA	TB	LB	Pts	Qualification
1	Leicester Tigers (C)	22	18	1	3	571	346	+225	60	25	7	1	82	Champion; 2001–02 Heineken Cup
2	London Wasps	22	16	0	6	663	428	+235	77	37	7	3	74	2001–02 Heineken Cup
3	Bath	22	14	0	8	680	430	+250	72	37	9	5	70	2001–02 Heineken Cup
4	Northampton Saints	22	13	0	9	518	463	+55	45	45	3	4	59	2001–02 Heineken Cup
5	Saracens	22	12	0	10	589	501	+88	63	48	6	4	58	
6	Newcastle Falcons (Note: Newcastle gained a spot by virtue of winning the Powergen Cup.)	22	11	0	11	554	568	−14	57	65	7	6	57	2001–02 Heineken Cup
7	Gloucester	22	10	0	12	473	526	−53	43	45	3	5	48	
8	London Irish	22	10	1	11	476	576	−100	36	60	1	2	45	
9	Bristol	22	9	1	12	443	492	−49	34	36	1	5	44	
10	Sale Sharks	22	8	1	13	561	622	−61	56	67	6	3	43	
11	Harlequins (Note: Harlequins gained a spot in the Heineken Cup by winning the 2000–01 European Challenge Cup.)	22	7	0	15	440	538	−98	44	48	3	7	38	2001–02 Heineken Cup
12	Rotherham Titans (R)	22	2	0	20	335	813	−478	29	103	1	3	12	Relegation place

== Results ==
=== Week 1 ===
19 August 2000
14:00

London Wasps	22 – 24	Leicester Tigers

Loftus Road
Attendance: 6,328

19 August 2000
15:00

NEC Harlequins	16 – 22	London Irish

Twickenham Stoop
Attendance: 5,093

19 August 2000
15:00

Sale Sharks	33 – 32	Bath Rugby

Heywood Road
Attendance: 2,980

20 August 2000
14:30

Newcastle Falcons	27 – 21	Northampton Saints

Kingston Park
Attendance: 3,245

20 August 2000
15:00

Rotherham Titans	20 – 23	Bristol Shoguns

Clifton Lane
Attendance: 2,700

20 August 2000
15:00

Saracens	50 – 20	Gloucester

Vicarage Road
Attendance: 7,682

=== Week 2 ===
26 August 2000
14:00

Bristol Shoguns	23 – 34	Saracens

Memorial Stadium
Attendance: 4,280

26 August 2000
15:00

Gloucester	18 – 19	Sale Sharks

Kingsholm
Attendance: 5,500

26 August 2000
15:00

NEC Harlequins	26 – 13	Rotherham Titans

Twickenham Stoop
Attendance: 3,217

26 August 2000
15:00

Northampton Saints	27 – 10	London Irish

Franklin’s Gardens
Attendance: 6,713

27 August 2000
14:30

Newcastle Falcons	22 – 25	Leicester Tigers

Kingston Park
Attendance: 4,298

27 August 2000
15:00

London Wasps	12 – 36	Bath Rugby

Loftus Road
Attendance: 4,037

=== Week 3 ===
2 September 2000
14:00

Leicester Tigers	33 – 19	Northampton Saints

Welford Road
Attendance: 14,088

2 September 2000
14:15

Bath Rugby	38 – 22	NEC Harlequins

Recreation Ground
Attendance: 6,958

2 September 2000
15:00

London Irish	27 – 22	Saracens

Madejski Stadium
Attendance: 7,312

2 September 2000
15:00

Rotherham Titans	23 – 29	Gloucester

Clifton Lane
Attendance: 2,500

2 September 2000
15:00

Sale Sharks	13 – 27	Newcastle Falcons

Heywood Road
Attendance: 2,885

3 September 2000
15:00

London Wasps	23 – 17	Bristol Shoguns

Loftus Road
Attendance: 3,525

=== Week 4 ===
6 September 2000
19:30

Bristol Shoguns	13 – 36	Sale Sharks

Memorial Stadium
Attendance: 3,100

6 September 2000
19:30

Newcastle Falcons	18 – 19	Gloucester

Kingston Park
Attendance: 2,623

6 September 2000
19:30

Northampton Saints	27 – 20	NEC Harlequins

Franklin’s Gardens
Attendance: 6,645

6 September 2000
19:45

Leicester Tigers	26 – 18	Rotherham Titans

Welford Road
Attendance: 9,801

6 September 2000
19:45

Saracens	24 – 30	London Wasps

Vicarage Road
Attendance: 7,312

9 September 2000
14:00

Gloucester	21 – 22	Bath Rugby

Kingsholm
Attendance: 6,754

9 September 2000
15:00

NEC Harlequins	18 – 31	London Wasps

Twickenham Stoop
Attendance: 4,880

9 September 2000
15:00

Sale Sharks	34 – 23	Northampton Saints

Heywood Road
Attendance: 1,844

10 September 2000
14:30

Newcastle Falcons	34 – 19	Rotherham Titans

Kingston Park
Attendance: 2,735

10 September 2000
15:00

Bristol Shoguns	26 – 30	London Irish

Memorial Stadium
Attendance: 2,902

10 September 2000
15:00

Saracens	17 – 9	Leicester Tigers

Vicarage Road
Attendance: 13,021

=== Week 5 ===
16 September 2000
14:15

Bath Rugby	19 – 12	Newcastle Falcons

Recreation Ground
Attendance: 7,503

16 September 2000
14:15

NEC Harlequins	31 – 25	Bristol Shoguns

Twickenham Stoop
Attendance: 3,089

16 September 2000
15:00

Leicester Tigers	33 – 20	London Irish

Welford Road
Attendance: 12,168

16 September 2000
15:00

Rotherham Titans	19 – 32	Northampton Saints

Clifton Lane
Attendance: 2,363

16 September 2000
15:00

Sale Sharks	6 – 51	Saracens

Heywood Road
Attendance: 3,130

17 September 2000
15:00

London Wasps	43 – 23	Gloucester

Loftus Road
Attendance: 4,277

=== Week 6 ===
23 September 2000
14:15

Newcastle Falcons	59 – 21	London Wasps

Kingston Park
Attendance: 4,233

23 September 2000
15:00

Bristol Shoguns	24 – 20	Leicester Tigers

Memorial Stadium
Attendance: 6,200

23 September 2000
15:00

Gloucester	27 – 23	NEC Harlequins

Kingsholm
Attendance: 5,428

23 September 2000
15:00

Northampton Saints	24 – 13	Bath Rugby

Franklin’s Gardens
Attendance: 7,465

24 September 2000
15:00

London Irish	28 – 13	Sale Sharks

Madejski Stadium
Attendance: 4,198

24 September 2000
15:00

Saracens	59 – 5	Rotherham Titans

Vicarage Road
Attendance: 6,092

=== Week 7 ===
30 September 2000
14:15

Bath Rugby	21 – 33	Saracens

Recreation Ground
Attendance: 8,000

30 September 2000
15:00

Gloucester	38 – 16	Bristol Shoguns

Kingsholm
Attendance: 6,503

30 September 2000
15:00

NEC Harlequins	18 – 20	Newcastle Falcons

Twickenham Stoop
Attendance: 4,445

30 September 2000
15:00

Rotherham Titans	19 – 18	London Irish

Clifton Lane
Attendance: 2,000

30 September 2000
15:00

Sale Sharks	17 – 17	Leicester Tigers

Heywood Road
Attendance: 3,407

1 October 2000
15:00

London Wasps	53 – 17	Northampton Saints

Loftus Road
Attendance: 4,612

=== Week 8 ===
18 November 2000
12:30

Bristol Shoguns	32 – 21	Rotherham Titans

Memorial Stadium
Attendance: 2,380

18 November 2000
12:30

Gloucester	16 – 15	Saracens

Kingsholm
Attendance: 5,909

18 November 2000
13:00

Leicester Tigers	28 – 13	London Wasps

Welford Road
Attendance: 9,300

18 November 2000
13:00

Northampton Saints	26 – 18	Newcastle Falcons

Franklin’s Gardens
Attendance: 6,734

19 November 2000
14:15

Bath Rugby	34 – 32	Sale Sharks

Recreation Ground
Attendance: 7,348

19 November 2000
15:00

London Irish	21 – 16	NEC Harlequins

Madejski Stadium
Attendance: 5,918

=== Week 9 ===
24 November 2000
20:00

NEC Harlequins	13 – 16	Leicester Tigers

Twickenham Stoop
Attendance: 4,613

25 November 2000
12:30

Gloucester	26 – 6	London Irish

Kingsholm
Attendance: 5,618

25 November 2000
13:00

Northampton Saints	24 – 6	Bristol Shoguns

Franklin’s Gardens
Attendance: 6,093

26 November 2000
14:15

Bath Rugby	42 – 19	Rotherham Titans

Recreation Ground
Attendance: 7,100

26 November 2000
14:30

Newcastle Falcons	32 – 27	Saracens

Kingston Park
Attendance: 5,473

26 November 2000
15:00

London Wasps	33 – 24	Sale Sharks

Loftus Road
Attendance: 3,087

=== Week 10 ===
2 December 2000
12:30

Bristol Shoguns	16 – 9	Bath Rugby

Memorial Stadium
Attendance: 6,335

2 December 2000
13:00

Leicester Tigers	31 – 28	Gloucester

Welford Road
Attendance: 11,800

2 December 2000
13:00

Rotherham Titans	15 – 30	London Wasps

Clifton Lane
Attendance: 2,100

2 December 2000
13:00

Sale Sharks	35 – 10	NEC Harlequins

Heywood Road
Attendance: 2,002

3 December 2000
15:00

Saracens	10 – 30	Northampton Saints

Vicarage Road
Attendance: 10,483

5 December 2000
20:00

London Irish	19 – 17	Newcastle Falcons

Madejski Stadium
Attendance: 4,612

=== Week 11 ===
16 December 2000
14:00

Northampton Saints	34 – 15	Gloucester

Franklin’s Gardens
Attendance: 7,225

16 December 2000
15:00

Leicester Tigers	27 – 19	Bath Rugby

Welford Road
Attendance: 14,552

16 December 2000
15:00

London Irish	14 – 13	London Wasps

Madejski Stadium
Attendance: 5,220

16 December 2000
15:00

Sale Sharks	45 – 12	Rotherham Titans

Heywood Road
Attendance: 2,200

17 December 2000
15:00

Bristol Shoguns	27 – 14	Newcastle Falcons

Memorial Stadium
Attendance: 3,687

17 December 2000
15:00

Saracens	26 – 18	NEC Harlequins

Vicarage Road
Attendance: 7,681

=== Week 12 ===
23 December 2000
14:00

Sale Sharks	25 – 26	Bristol Shoguns

Heywood Road
Attendance: 2,631

23 December 2000
14:15

Bath Rugby	56 – 20	London Irish

Recreation Ground
Attendance: 7,317

23 December 2000
14:15

Rotherham Titans	9 – 27	Leicester Tigers

Clifton Lane
Attendance: 4,000

23 December 2000
15:00

Gloucester	28 – 13	Newcastle Falcons

Kingsholm
Attendance: 7,455

23 December 2000
15:00

London Wasps	25 – 6	Saracens

Loftus Road
Attendance: 7,835

23 December 2000
15:00

NEC Harlequins	25 – 34	Northampton Saints

Twickenham Stoop
Attendance: 4,128

=== Week 13 ===
26 December 2000
14:15

Bath Rugby	16 – 17	Leicester Tigers

Recreation Ground
Attendance: 8,500

27 December 2000
14:30

Newcastle Falcons	23 – 15	Bristol Shoguns

Kingston Park
Attendance: 3,738

27 December 2000
15:00

NEC Harlequins	14 – 30	Saracens

Twickenham Stoop
Attendance: 5,089

27 December 2000
19:30

Gloucester	12 – 15	Northampton Saints

Kingsholm
Attendance: 9,859

27 December 2000
19:45

London Wasps	29 – 16	London Irish

Loftus Road
Attendance: 5,084

30 December 2000
15:00

Northampton Saints	18 – 21	London Wasps

Franklin’s Gardens
Attendance: 9,437

30 December 2000
15:00

Saracens	11 – 31	Bath Rugby

Vicarage Road
Attendance: 11,192

=== Week 14 ===
6 January 2001
14:15

Bath Rugby	36 – 13	Northampton Saints

Recreation Ground
Attendance: 7,802

6 January 2001
14:15

Rotherham Titans	19 – 8	Saracens

Clifton Lane
Attendance: 3,500

6 January 2001
15:00

Bristol Shoguns	18 – 9	Gloucester

Memorial Stadium
Attendance: 6,781

=== Week 15 ===
6 February 2001
19:45

Leicester Tigers	17 – 10	Bristol Shoguns

Welford Road
Attendance: 12,332

6 February 2001
20:00

NEC Harlequins	21 – 19	Gloucester

Twickenham Stoop
Attendance: 4,800

10 February 2001
14:00

Northampton Saints	42 – 0	Rotherham Titans

Franklin’s Gardens
Attendance: 8,062

10 February 2001
15:00

Gloucester	3 – 28	London Wasps

Kingsholm
Attendance: 6,940

10 February 2001
15:00

London Irish	9 – 28	Leicester Tigers

Madejski Stadium
Attendance: 7,531

11 February 2001
14:30

Newcastle Falcons	24 – 23	Bath Rugby

Kingston Park
Attendance: 7,319

11 February 2001
15:00

Bristol Shoguns	13 – 9	NEC Harlequins

Memorial Stadium
Attendance: 4,600

11 February 2001
15:00

Saracens	44 – 30	Sale Sharks

Vicarage Road
Attendance: 7,115

=== Week 16 ===
20 February 2001
20:00

London Irish	54 – 11	Rotherham Titans

Madejski Stadium
Attendance: 2,504

24 February 2001
14:15

Bath Rugby	50 – 16	Gloucester

Recreation Ground
Attendance: 8,200

24 February 2001
15:00

Leicester Tigers	56 – 15	Saracens

Welford Road
Attendance: 14,212

24 February 2001
15:00

London Irish	26 – 26	Bristol Shoguns

Madejski Stadium
Attendance: 3,349

24 February 2001
15:00

Northampton Saints	32 – 26	Sale Sharks

Franklin’s Gardens
Attendance: 7,849

=== Week 17 ===
6 March 2001
19:15

Newcastle Falcons	22 – 24	NEC Harlequins

Kingston Park
Attendance: 3,620

6 March 2001
19:45

Leicester Tigers	24 – 12	Sale Sharks

Welford Road
Attendance: 9,000

10 March 2001
14:15

Northampton Saints	9 – 12	Leicester Tigers

Franklin’s Gardens
Attendance: 10,000

10 March 2001
15:00

Gloucester	50 – 17	Rotherham Titans

Kingsholm
Attendance: 5,850

10 March 2001
15:00

NEC Harlequins	24 – 22	Bath Rugby

Twickenham Stoop
Attendance: 7,067

11 March 2001
14:30

Newcastle Falcons	48 – 24	Sale Sharks

Kingston Park
Attendance: 3,318

11 March 2001
15:00

Bristol Shoguns	12 – 24	London Wasps

Memorial Stadium
Attendance: 5,444

11 March 2001
15:00

Saracens	35 – 22	London Irish

Vicarage Road
Attendance: 7,913

=== Week 18 ===
14 March 2001
20:00

London Irish	13 – 58	Bath Rugby

Madejski Stadium
Attendance: 5,303

17 March 2001
12:15

Leicester Tigers	51 – 7	Newcastle Falcons

Welford Road
Attendance: 15,009

17 March 2001
14:15

Bath Rugby	16 – 13	London Wasps

Recreation Ground
Attendance: 8,200

17 March 2001
14:15

Rotherham Titans	12 – 32	NEC Harlequins

Clifton Lane
Attendance: 2,000

17 March 2001
15:00

London Irish	13 – 10	Northampton Saints

Madejski Stadium
Attendance: 12,037

17 March 2001
15:00

Sale Sharks	16 – 24	Gloucester

Heywood Road
Attendance: 3,514

18 March 2001
15:00

Saracens	24 – 13	Bristol Shoguns

Vicarage Road
Attendance: 12,843

=== Week 19 ===
24 March 2001
14:15

Rotherham Titans	13 – 39	Sale Sharks

Clifton Lane
Attendance: 2,000

28 March 2001
19:45

London Wasps	44 – 7	Newcastle Falcons

Loftus Road
Attendance: 3,444

31 March 2001
14:15

Bath Rugby	19 – 16	Bristol Shoguns

Recreation Ground
Attendance: 8,200

31 March 2001
15:00

Gloucester	22 – 13	Leicester Tigers

Kingsholm
Attendance: 7,614

31 March 2001
15:00

NEC Harlequins	36 – 10	Sale Sharks

Twickenham Stoop
Attendance: 5,039

31 March 2001
15:00

Northampton Saints	25 – 14	Saracens

Franklin’s Gardens
Attendance: 9,424

1 April 2001
14:30

Newcastle Falcons	42 – 35	London Irish

Kingston Park
Attendance: 5,963

1 April 2001
15:00

London Wasps	58 – 3	Rotherham Titans

Loftus Road
Attendance: 4,276

=== Week 20 ===
10 April 2001
18:00

Rotherham Titans	36 – 39	Newcastle Falcons

Clifton Lane
Attendance: 1,800

10 April 2001
19:30

Sale Sharks	43 – 18	London Irish

Heywood Road
Attendance: 2,469

10 April 2001
19:45

London Wasps	38 – 19	NEC Harlequins

Loftus Road
Attendance: 12,137

14 April 2001
14:15

Sale Sharks	29 – 59	London Wasps

Heywood Road
Attendance: 3,877

14 April 2001
15:00

Leicester Tigers	37 – 5	NEC Harlequins

Welford Road
Attendance: 16,006

14 April 2001
15:00

Rotherham Titans	12 – 68	Bath Rugby

Clifton Lane
Attendance: 3,000

15 April 2001
15:00

Saracens	34 – 29	Newcastle Falcons

Vicarage Road
Attendance: 10,107

=== Week 21 ===
16 April 2001
15:00

Bristol Shoguns	46 – 16	Northampton Saints

Memorial Stadium
Attendance: 5,315

16 April 2001
15:00

London Irish	35 – 10	Gloucester

Madejski Stadium
Attendance: 7,131

== Zurich Championship ==
The top eight teams qualified for the knock-out Zurich Championship, seeded on the basis of their league finish.

=== Seeding ===
Seed	Team	Table points	Wins	Points diff
1	Leicester Tigers	82	18	+225
2	London Wasps	74	16	+235
3	Bath Rugby	70	14	+250
4	Northampton Saints	59	13	+55
5	Saracens	58	12	+88
6	Newcastle Falcons	57	11	−14
7	Gloucester	48	10	−53
8	London Irish	45	10	−100

=== Quarter–finals ===
28 April 2001

Leicester Tigers	24 – 11	London Irish
	Report

Welford Road
Attendance: 8,112
Referee: Tony Spreadbury

28 April 2001

Northampton Saints	45 – 17	Saracens
	Report

Franklin's Gardens
Attendance: 8,500
Referee: Chris White

28 April 2001

Bath	18 – 9	Newcastle Falcons
	Report

Recreation Ground
Attendance: 6,840
Referee: Rob Goodliffe

29 April 2001

London Wasps	18 – 6	Gloucester
	Report

Loftus Road
Attendance: 4,986
Referee: Steve Lander

=== Semi–finals ===
5 May 2001

Leicester Tigers	17 – 13	Northampton Saints
	Report

Welford Road
Attendance: 10,787

6 May 2001

London Wasps	31 – 36	Bath
	Report

Loftus Road
Attendance: 8,094
Referee: Brian Campsall

=== Final ===
13 May 2001

Leicester Tigers	22–10	Bath
T-Johnson, Healey, Stanley; C-Stimpson (2); P-Stimpson	Report	T-Thirlby; C-Perry; P-Perry

Twickenham Stadium
Attendance: 33,500
Referee: Steve Lander

Team details

Leicester Tigers
Bath

15	(England) Tim Stimpson
14	(Ireland) Geordan Murphy
13	(England) Leon Lloyd
12	(Australia) Pat Howard
11	(Canada) Winston Stanley
10	(England) Andy Goode
9	(England) Austin Healey
1	(England) Graham Rowntree
2	(England) Dorian West
3	(England) Darren Garforth
4	(England) Martin Johnson (Capt)
5	(England) Ben Kay
6	(England) Martin Corry
7	(England) Neil Back
8	(England) Will Johnson
Replacements:
16	(South Africa) Glenn Gelderbloom
17	(England) Jamie Hamilton
18	(New Zealand) Perry Freshwater
19	(England) Richard Cockerill
20	(England) Ricky Nebbett
21	(England) Paul Gustard
22	(England) Lewis Moody
Coach: (England) Dean Richards

15	(England) Matt Perry
14	(England) Iain Balshaw
13	(Ireland) Kevin Maggs
12	(Australia) Shaun Berne
11	(England) Tom Voyce
10	(England) Mike Catt
9	(Wales) Gareth Cooper
1	(England) Simon Emms
2	(England) Andrew Long
3	(England) John Mallett
4	(England) Mark Gabey
5	(England) Steve Borthwick
6	(England) Angus Gardiner
7	(England) Ben Clarke (Capt)
8	(United States) Dan Lyle
Replacements:
16	(England) Rob Thirlby
17	(England) Sam Cox
18	(England) David Barnes
19	(England) Mark Regan
20	(Wales) Gavin Thomas
21	(Wales) Andy Lloyd
Coach:

== Attendances ==
Club	Home Games	Total	Average	Highest	Lowest	% Capacity
Bath	12	91,968	7,664	8,500	6,840	90%
Bristol	11	51,024	4,639	6,781	2,380	55%
Gloucester	11	73,430	6,675	9,859	5,428	56%
Harlequins	11	51,460	4,678	7,067	3,089	55%
Leicester Tigers	13	157,167	12,090	16,006	8,112	71%
London Irish	11	65,115	5,920	12,037	2,504	25%
London Wasps	13	73,719	5,671	12,137	3,444	31%
Newcastle Falcons	11	46,565	4,233	7,319	2,623	53%
Northampton Saints	12	94,147	7,846	10,000	6,093	78%
Rotherham Titans	11	27,963	2,542	4,000	1,800	64%
Sale Sharks	11	30,939	2,813	3,877	1,844	59%
Saracens	11	101,441	9,222	13,021	6,092	42%

== Leading scorers ==
Note: Flags to the left of player names indicate national team as has been defined under World Rugby eligibility rules, or primary nationality for players who have not earned international senior caps. Players may hold one or more non-WR nationalities.

=== Most points ===
Rank	Player	Club	Points
1	(Scotland) Kenny Logan	Wasps	282
2	(England) Tim Stimpson	Leicester Tigers	260
3	(England) Paul Grayson	Northampton Saints	219
4	(England) Jonny Wilkinson	Newcastle Falcons	203
5	(Ireland) Barry Everitt	London Irish	180
6	(New Zealand) Jon Preston	Bath	172
7	(Argentina) Felipe Contepomi	Bristol	168
8	(Fiji) Nicky Little	Sale Sharks	162
9	(New Zealand) Simon Mannix	Gloucester	157
10	(England) Charlie Hodgson	Sale Sharks	144

=== Most tries ===
Rank	Player	Club	Tries
1	(England) Paul Sampson	Wasps	12
2	(England) Steve Hanley	Sale Sharks	10
2	(Scotland) Kenny Logan	Wasps	10
2	(England) Tom Voyce	Bath	10
5	(England) Ben Cohen	Northampton Saints	9
6	(England) Neil Back	Leicester Tigers	8
6	(Ireland) Geordan Murphy	Leicester Tigers	8
6	(England) Paul Sackey	London Irish	8
6	(England) Rob Thirlby	Bath	8
10	8 players		7

== See also ==
- 2000–01 National Division One
- 2000–01 National Division Two
- 2000–01 National Division Three North
- 2000–01 National Division Three South
