= Ben Willis =

Ben Willis may refer to:

- Ben Willis (character), character in the horror film series I Know What You Did Last Summer
- Ben Willis (rugby union) (born 1976), New Zealand rugby union player
- Ben Willis (soccer) (born 1996), American soccer player

== See also ==
- Benjamin Willis (disambiguation)
