= Benjamin Willis =

Benjamin Willis may refer to:

- Benjamin A. Willis (1840–1886), American politician
- Benjamin Willis (educator) (1901–1988), American educator and school administrator

== See also ==
- Ben Willis (disambiguation)
