= Paddy Costello =

Irish rugby union player

- Born: 18 August 1931 Dublin, Ireland
- Died: 6 October 1997 (aged 66) Dublin, Ireland
- Notable relative: Victor Costello (son)

Rugby union career
- Position: Lock
International career
Years	Team	Apps	(Points)
1960	Ireland	1	(0)

Paddy Costello (18 August 1931 — 6 October 1997) was an Irish international rugby union player.

Born in Dublin, Costello was a second-rower, capped for Ireland in a 1960 Five Nations match against France at Colombes, lost by 17-points. He won two Leinster Senior Cups playing with Bective Rangers. In addition to rugby, Costello was also a four-time Irish NACAI champion for shot put and played soccer as a centre-half with Longford Town.

Costello's son Victor was an Olympic shot putter and Ireland international loose forward.

== See also ==
- List of Ireland national rugby union players
