= Denis J. Hickie =

Irish rugby union player (1943–2021)

- Born: Denis Joseph Hickie; 12 April 1943 Dublin, Ireland
- Died: 26 December 2021 (aged 78) Dublin, Ireland
- Height: 6 ft 3 in (1.91 m)
- School: St. Mary's College, Dublin

Rugby union career
- Position: Number 8
Amateur team(s)
Years	Team	Apps	(Points)
- St. Mary’s College
Provincial / State sides
Years	Team	Apps	(Points)
	Leinster	23	
International career
Years	Team	Apps	(Points)
1970–1972	Ireland	6	
1972	Barbarian F.C.	1	

Denis Joseph Hickie (12 April 1943 – 26 December 2021) was an Irish rugby union player. He played as a number 8 for St. Mary's College, Leinster and Ireland.

== Career ==
Hickie, along with his brother Tony, played on the first team from St Mary's College to win the Leinster Schools Rugby Senior Cup in 1961 and they were also part of a successful era for the St. Mary's R.F.C. teams during the 1970s. Hickie captained St Mary's for three seasons and played on three Leinster Senior Cup-winning teams. He was also part of the 1975 team that won the Club Championship of Ireland, to celebrate the IRFU’s 100th anniversary. A career which featured 23 caps for Leinster and one cap for the Barbarians (1972), Hickie became one of the first St Mary's RFC players to be capped for Ireland. He won six caps throughout 1971 and 1972.

== Personal life and death ==
His son, Gavin Hickie, played with St Mary's and for Leinster during the Matt Williams era. His nephew, also Denis, played with Leinster for 12 seasons, Ireland and the British and Irish Lions.

Hickie died after a long period of ill health and dementia on 26 December 2021.

== Honours ==
St Mary's College

- Leinster Schools Rugby Senior Cup: 1961

St Mary's College RFC

- Leinster Senior Cup: 1969, 1971, 1974
