= Welsh Rugby Players Association =

WRPA
- Welsh Rugby Players Association
- Founded: 2003
- Location: Wales
- Executive Chairman: Josh Macleod
- Key people: Barry Cawte (CEO)
- Website: wrpa.co.uk

The Welsh Rugby Players Association (WRPA) is a trade union representing athletes who currently play or who have played rugby union in Wales at a professional level. Founded in 2003, the WRPA aims to Represent, Develop, Promote and Protect all members in its association.

The association acts as a negotiator between players and their employer. They are involved with negotiating group contracts in areas such as match and win bonuses and act as a go-between in the event of disputes. This includes bringing industrial action if necessary. Recently, the WRPA has welcomed the Welsh 7's as members of the association.

The WRPA provides its members with a Personal Development Programme (PDP), which allows Personal Development Managers (PDM's) to undertake the personal development of players, whilst they continue to train as full-time professionals. The PDM's role is to support players in an array of areas including: Vulnerabilities, Careers & Education, Life Skills and "Mental Wellbeing".

The Welsh Rugby Players Association also provides it members support through its official charity, Second Half Rugby. The charity provides support to players who are facing hardship and are in times of need. Support is given to members over a range of areas whether it be financial, medical, integral or mental health related.

The WRPA headquarters are in Cardiff, Wales

== Executive committee ==
Barry Cawte became the Chief Executive of the Welsh Rugby Players Association in September 2019, coming across from the UK's largest leisure operator, GLL (Greenwich Leisure Limited). Cawte is also the independent chairman of Tennis Wales. Barry Cawte succeeds former Wales international back-row forward and Cardiff Blues captain, Andries Pretorius, who led the organisation for two years.

The current Head of Business of the WRPA is Philippa Hearnden. Philippa has been with the Welsh Rugby Players Association since June 2015.

James King, Ospreys and Wales backrow replaced Ken Owens as Chairman of the WRPA after 5 years in term. King announced he was stepping down from the role due to injury in February 2021.

As of February 2023, winger Ashton Hewitt is executive chairman of the WRPA.

== See also ==
- Rugby Players Ireland Irish national association for players' interests formed in October 2001
- Rugby Players' Association England national association for players' interests formed in 1998
- Rugby Union Players Association Australian national association for players' interests formed in October 1995
