= Shamrock Warriors RFC =

(Ireland) Shamrock Warriors RFC
- Union: IRFU
- Nickname: Warriors
- Founded: 2009
- Location: Dublin, Ireland

Official website
- www.shamrockwarriors.com

Shamrock Warriors RFC was a Rugby sevens club founded in 2009 by former Leinster out-half Fergal Campion. They were the only 7's club in Ireland endorsed by the Irish Rugby Football Union and were established to represent Ireland as the only official Irish 7's team competing at the top level tournaments in Europe.

== Aims ==
The clubs aim was to develop a pool of experienced 7's players for the IRFU to be in position to select to develop into a future international 7's squad to compete in tournaments by giving them experience playing in the top level competition should the IRFU become involved in professional international sevens or in the Olympic Sevens. The intention was to develop the game in Ireland and use the IRFU approved Warriors as the foundation for a national side. Ireland does not participate in the official HSBC Sevens World Series. The Shamrock Warriors was the beginning of the process of getting sevens into the IRFU and into the national circuit. The team was self-funded.

== Players ==
The player pool consisted of players who are playing club rugby in Ireland, those coming from provincial contracts and development players that may not win full professional contracts.

=== Women's team ===
There is also a women's team that consists of club players around the country led by former Irish captain Sarah Jane Belton and is managed by Kazakhstan international Luke O'Callaghan. The team also hopes to recruit female Gaelic football players.

== Key staff ==
Former Leinster and Scotland coach Matt Williams has been secured as a technical advisor for the venture while a committee including former internationals Denis Hickie and Malcolm O'Kelly has also come on board to assist the project.

The club aims to recruit players on playing at club level or those who may be coming off a professional contract, those falling off academy contracts as well as potential players coming up from school level. The team is managed by Derek Thornton.

=== Committee ===
- Fergal Campion
- Derek Thornton
- Matt Williams
- David McHugh
- Denis Hickie
- Victor Costello
- Malcolm O'Kelly

== Competitions ==
The club is planning to compete in a number of outings for 2011 including:

- Kinsale Sevens
- Omagh
- Manchester
- London Rocks
- West Country
- Newquay
- Roma seven
