= Darren Yapp =

English rugby union footballer

- Born: Darren Peter Yapp; 19 February 1975 (age 51) Wolverhampton, United Kingdom
- Height: 1.88 m (6 ft 2 in)
- School: The Castle School, Thornbury
- University: Swansea Institute of Higher Education

Rugby union career
- Position(s): Centre, Wing
Amateur team(s)
Years	Team	Apps	(Points)
–1996	Thornbury		
Senior career
Years	Team	Apps	(Points)
1996–2000	Bristol	35	(30)
2000–2008	Connacht	162	(135)
- Correct as of 6 June 2021

Darren Yapp (born 19 February 1975) is an English former rugby union footballer. He primarily played as a centre and on the wing. Yapp came through the amateur club Thornbury, before joining Bristol in 1996 after the game went professional. He moved from Bristol to Connacht in 2000 and spent the remainder of his career there.

Yapp featured 35 times for Bristol in the 1997–98 Premiership, as the team were relegated. He also played three games in the 1997–98 European Challenge Cup. The team spent the 1998–99 season in the Premiership Two but were promoted as champions, returning to the top flight for the 1999–2000 season.

In 2000, Yapp joined Irish provincial side Connacht. He played in the Irish Interprovincial Championship and the Challenge Cup in his first season. The 2001–02 season saw the foundation of the Celtic League, which replaced the Interprovincial series as the domestic competition for the Irish sides. For the remainder of his professional career, Yapp played in the Celtic League and the Challenge Cup. His performances for Connacht earned him a call up to the Ireland training squad in 2004. Yapp made his 100th appearance for Connacht on 12 May 2006 against the Neath–Swansea Ospreys.

In April 2008, having played 162 times for Connacht, Yapp announced that he would retire at the end of the season. He played two more games for the side, with his final appearance coming at home to Ospreys on the final day of the season.

2009 he stepped into help coach Bristol Aerospace company RFC work on attack and backs alongside the gift forward coach Mike Casper Underwood .

Darren is now a 2023 GEM award winner and is known professionally as D UNIT and IRISH JESUS.
