= Sam Cox (rugby union) =

English rugby union player

Sam Cox (born 11 December 1980 (age 44)) is an English rugby union player for Viadana

Sam Cox's position of choice is as a centre. He started out at North Dorset RFC as a mini. He moved on to play for Bath and Bristol in the Guinness Premiership. Before moving to Viadana in the Italian league. The 2010/2011 Season has seen Sam return to England to make a handful of appearances for Dings Crusaders in the National 2 South League before moving up to the Championship with Birmingham and Solihull Bees.

He has caps for England U18s and U21s.
