= Mark Gabey =

Australian rugby player (born 1973)

- Full name: Mark Laurence Gabey
- Born: 27 July 1973 (age 53) Proserpine, QLD, Australia
- Height: 6 ft 4 in (193 cm)
- Weight: 261 lb (118 kg)

Rugby union career
- Position: Lock / Back-row
Senior career
Years	Team	Apps	(Points)
1998–99	Bristol		
1999–00	London Irish		
2000–02	Bath Rugby		
2002–04	Worcester Warriors		
2005–06	Exeter Chiefs		
Super Rugby
Years	Team	Apps	(Points)
1997	Reds	1	(0)

Mark Laurence Gabey (born 27 July 1973) is an Australian former professional rugby union player.

== Rugby career ==
Born in Proserpine in north Queensland, Gabey could play both as a lock and in the back-row.

Gabey played once for the Reds during the 1997 Super 12 season, then continued his professional career in England.

=== England ===
Gabey made his Premiership Rugby debut in 1999–00 with London Irish and won their "player of the year" award that season. From 2000 to 2002, Gabey played in the premiership for Bath, before the recruitment of England lock Danny Grewcock forced him to look elsewhere and he signed with second-tier team Worcester. He returned to the premiership with Worcester in 2004, then finished his career with stints at the Exeter Chiefs and Birmingham & Solihull.
