= Nathan Spooner =

Australia international rugby union player

- Born: Nathan Raymond Spooner; 7 November 1975 (age 51)
- Height: 1.88 m (6 ft 2 in)
- Weight: 88 kg (13 st 12 lb)
- Occupation: Rugby union player

Rugby union career
Senior career
Years	Team	Apps	(Points)
2001–2003	Leinster	10	(68)
Super Rugby
Years	Team	Apps	(Points)
1997	NSW Waratahs	3	(0)
1998–2001	Queensland Reds	12	(208)
2004	Natal Sharks		
International career
Years	Team	Apps	(Points)
1999	Australia	4	(50)

Nathan Raymond Spooner (born 1975) is a retired rugby union player, who represented Australia. He typically played in the out-half (or fly-half) position.

== Career ==
=== Clubs and provinces ===
- 1997 : NSW Waratahs, Australia
- 1999-2001 : Queensland Reds, Australia
- 2001-2003 : Leinster, Ireland
- 2003 : Sharks, South Africa
- 2004-2007 Mie Honda Heat, Japan

=== Australian International Career ===
He played under-age representative rugby, before making his debut for Australia on 12 June 1999 against Ireland in Brisbane, scoring 17 points. His final test match was against the same team on 19 June 1999.

=== Club Rugby ===
He played for Queensland Reds. In 1998, he was largely sidelined by a shoulder injury, but in 1999 he was out-half for a side that reached the Super12 semi-finals, scoring 131 points. The following year, he was again largely unable to play, due to surgery, playing only 4 games early in 2001.

He was then signed for Leinster Rugby for the 2001-2002 season, playing in Leinster's victory in the 2001–02 Celtic League final (in which he scored 14 points) and in Leinster's Heineken Cup quarter-final defeat at the hands of Leicester Tigers. He remained with Leinster for the following season, in spite of sustaining a further severe shoulder injury in April 2002. After the signing of Felipe Contepomi was announced towards the end of the 2002-3 season, Spooner was not offered a new contract. After leaving Leinster, Spooner went to the Natal Sharks in September 2003. Following a season with the Sharks, Spooner went to play in Japan with Mie Honda Heat until 2007 when he retired, going on to work in sales.
