= Nathan Turner =

Australian rugby player

Personal information
- Born: Australia

Playing information
- Position: Wing, Centre
Club
Years	Team	Pld	T	G	FG	P
1995–96	South Queensland Crushers	6	0	4	0	8
1997	Oldham Bears	3	0	0	0	0
	Total	9	0	4	0	8
- Source: RLP

Nathan Turner is an Australian rugby player who played rugby league professionally for the South Queensland Crushers and Oldham Bears and rugby union professionally for Leinster.

He is now a criminal defence lawyer and partner in the law firm Anderson Fredericks Turner.

== Playing career ==
Turner originally played rugby union as a fullback for the Sunnybank club in Brisbane. In 1994 he was selected for the Australian under-21 tour of Africa but withdrew due to his planned switch of codes the next year.

Turner signed with the new South Queensland Crushers rugby league franchise in 1995 and played in their inaugural team on 11 March. However Turner did not establish himself and went on to play in only six matches over the next two seasons. In 1997 Turner joined the Oldham Bears in 1997's Super League II. However Turner returned to Queensland without playing a match after suffering a foot injury.

In the late 1990s Turner coached London Skolars rugby league club in the National Conference League. He later managed a playing comeback in rugby union with Leinster and Blackrock College in Ireland.

He currently works as a Barrister-at-Law on the Sunshine Coast, Queensland, Australia.
