= Gavin Hickie =

- Born: Gavin Denis Hickie; 24 April 1980 (age 46) Dublin, Ireland
- Height: 5 ft 10 in (1.78 m)
- Weight: 15 st 7 lb (100 kg)
- School: St. Mary's College, Dublin
- University: University College Dublin
- Notable relative: Denis J. Hickie Father Denis Hickie Cousin
- Occupation: Rugby union coach

Rugby union career
- Position: Hooker
Amateur team(s)
Years	Team	Apps	(Points)
1998-2005	St. Mary's College RFC		
Provincial / State sides
Years	Team	Apps	(Points)
2001—2005	Leinster	43	(0)
2005	London Irish	1	(0)
2005–2006	Worcester Warriors	11	(0)
2006–2008	Leicester Tigers	11	(0)
2008	Belmont Shore		
International career
Years	Team	Apps	(Points)
2002	Ireland A	3	(0)
–	Ireland 7s		
- Correct as of 10 Feb 2015

Gavin Hickie is an Irish rugby union coach, currently the head coach and director of rugby for the United States Naval Academy. Hickie led the Midshipmen to their first ever National Championship win in 2023. The Navy rugby team went undefeated throughout the season, culminating in an 18-0 record.

Hickie was the head coach of the Dartmouth College rugby team 2012 to 2017. Hickie was previously the forwards coach of Belmont Shore Rugby Club, and the head coach of Wilson High School, Long Beach, California. He was the assistant coach for USA U20s in when they won the World Rugby Junior World Trophy title in 2012 and again in the World Rugby Junior World Championship 2013, before going on to be the head coach of the USA Rugby Collegiate All-Americans from 2015 to 2017.

== Rugby career ==
Hickie was educated in St Marys College and University College Dublin and played for Ireland at Schools, U19, U21 and A levels and sevens. He made his debut for Ireland A in the 70th minute of 55–22 victory over Wales A on 2 February 2002.

Hickie played as a hooker and played professional rugby for Leinster, helping them win the inaugural Celtic League in 2001. Hickie went on to play for the London Irish RFC and Worcester Warriors. Hickie played with the Leicester Tigers helping the team win the Guinness Premiership in 2007. He suffered a number of injuries and after a tackle on Jason Robinson resulted in ruptures to his infraspinatus and supraspinatus shoulder muscles his professional playing career was effectively over.

Hickie also played rugby in the United States with Belmont Shore RFC in the Rugby Super League (US).

Hickie is a rugby analyst, including appearances on CNN, and NPR's All Things Considered show and writing for The Rugby Site

In September 2015 Bloomsbury Publishing published his book Rugby Revealed, written with co-author Eilidh Donaldson, and featuring advice from professional players.

== Personal ==
Hickie is the son of former Irish international rugby player Denis J. Hickie and first cousin to former professional rugby player Denis Hickie.
