= Nigel Whitehouse =

- Notable relative: Ben Whitehouse (son)

Rugby union career
Refereeing career
Years	Competition	Apps
1996–2006	Test Matches	
–	Heineken Cup	26
–	European Challenge Cup	13

Nigel Whitehouse is a Welsh rugby union referee. He has refereed 26 Heineken Cup matches and 13 Amlin Challenge Cup matches between 1996 and 2006, as well as international matches.
