= Simon Keogh =

Simon Richard Keogh
- Born: Simon Keogh Dublin, Ireland
- Height: 5'8
- Weight: 88 kg (194 lb)
- School: St Michaels
- University: UCD

Rugby union career
- Position: Back
- Current team: Old Belvedere RFC
Senior career
Years	Team	Apps	(Points)
2000-03	Leinster Rugby	11	(15)
2003-08	Harlequins F.C.	133	(245)
2008-10	Leinster Rugby	21	(15)
International career
Years	Team	Apps	(Points)
2006-09	Ireland A	5	(0)

Simon Keogh (born 1979) is a retired rugby union player who played on the wing and scrum half for Leinster Rugby and for Harlequins F.C.

In 2000, Simon was named Leinster Rugby Young Player of the Year.

In 2004, whilst playing with Harlequins F.C. he won the Challenge Cup scoring the winning try in injury-time against Clermont-Ferrand (now ASM Clermont Auvergne). He was named Supporters' Player of the Year for Harlequins in the 2005/06 season. After returning to Leinster Rugby, he has won the Heineken Cup with them in 2009.

He also represented Ireland A's travelling to the 2006 Churchill Cup in San Hose and to the 2009 Churchill Cup in Colorado.

Upon retirement, Simon qualified as a solicitor and is now CEO of Rugby Players Ireland the representative body for professional rugby players in Ireland.
