= Ben Willis (rugby union) =

New Zealand rugby player (born 1976)

- Full name: Benjamin John Willis
- Born: 8 October 1976 (age 50) Auckland, New Zealand
- Height: 5 ft 9 in (175 cm)
- Weight: 187 lb (85 kg)
- School: King's College

Rugby union career
- Position: Halfback
Senior career
Years	Team	Apps	(Points)
2000–01	Grenoble		
2001–03	Leinster Rugby		
2003–04	Harlequins		
2004–05	AS Beziers		
2005–07	London Irish		
2007	Saracens		
Provincial / State sides
Years	Team	Apps	(Points)
1995–98	Auckland	7	(10)
1999–00	Waikato	22	(30)
Super Rugby
Years	Team	Apps	(Points)
1999	Chiefs	1	(0)
International career
Years	Team	Apps	(Points)
2002	Ireland "A"		

Benjamin John Willis (born 8 October 1976) is a New Zealand former professional rugby union player.

== Biography ==
Born in Auckland, Willis is a descendant of novelist Jane Austen and was educated at King's College.

=== Rugby career ===
Willis, an NZ Colts halfback, appeared once for the Chiefs in the 1999 Super 12 season. He left New Zealand rugby after the 2000 season to continue his career in Europe, starting with a stint at Grenoble, then signing with Leinster. Qualifying through an Irish grandfather, Willis was an Ireland "A" representative player during his time at Leinster, before moving on to Harlequins in 2003. He was in the New Zealand Barbarians team that played England at Twickenham in 2003 and had a season with AS Beziers in 2004–05. Following his time in France, Willis competed for London Irish from 2005 to 2007, at the end of which he linked up with Saracens as Heineken Cup injury cover.
