= Colm McMahon =

Irish rugby union coach

- Born: 10 December 1976 (age 49) County Clare, Ireland
- Height: 1.83 m (6 ft 0 in)
- Weight: 90 kg (14 st; 200 lb)

Rugby union career
- Position: Flanker
Amateur team(s)
Years	Team	Apps	(Points)
- Shannon
Senior career
Years	Team	Apps	(Points)
1999–2004	Munster	23	(5)
- Correct as of 11 February 2020

Colm McMahon (born 10 December 1976) is an Irish former rugby union player for Munster, where he is currently head of rugby development. He played as a flanker.

== Munster ==
McMahon represented Shannon and Munster during his playing career, before joining Munster as a coach development officer in 2009, as well as coaching roles at various age grades for Ireland. In 2011, he became an elite development officer for Munster's academy, a role he held until 2020, when he replaced the outgoing Ultan O'Callaghan as Munster's head of rugby development. McMahon was also an interim forwards coach for Munster during the early games of the 2019–20 season, as Graham Rowntree, newly appointed to the role, was away at the 2019 Rugby World Cup with Georgia.
