= 2001–02 Heineken Cup =

International rugby union competition

Tournament details
- Countries: England; France; Ireland; Italy; Scotland; Wales
- Tournament format(s): Round-robin and Knockout
- Date: 22 October 2001 – 25 May 2002

Tournament statistics
- Teams: 24
- Matches played: 79
- Attendance: 656,382 (8,309 per match)
- Top point scorer(s): Ronan O'Gara (Munster) (129 points)
- Top try scorer(s): Ugo Mola (Castres) (7 tries)

Final
- Venue: Millennium Stadium, Cardiff
- Attendance: 74,600
- Champions: (England) Leicester Tigers (2nd title)
- Runners-up: (Ireland) Munster

The 2001–02 Heineken Cup was the seventh edition of the Heineken Cup. Competing teams from France, Ireland, Italy, Wales, England and Scotland, were divided into six pools of four, in which teams played home and away matches against each other. The pool winners and two best runners-up qualified for the knock-out stages. Leicester Tigers won the cup, securing back-to-back titles.

== Teams ==
France	England	Wales	Scotland	Ireland	Italy
Perpignan; Stade Français; Biarritz; Castres; Montferrand; Toulouse	Leicester Tigers; London Wasps; Bath; Harlequins; Northampton; Newcastle Falcons	Llanelli; Swansea; Bridgend; Cardiff; Newport	Edinburgh; Glasgow	Ulster; Munster; Leinster	Calvisano; Treviso

== Pool stage ==
In the pool matches teams received

- 2 points for a win
- 1 points for a draw

=== Pool 1 ===
Team	P	W	D	L	Tries for	Tries against	Try diff	Points for	Points against	Points diff	Pts
(England) Leicester Tigers	6	5	0	1	17	3	14	175	88	87	10
(Wales) Llanelli	6	4	0	2	22	8	14	187	99	88	8
(France) Perpignan	6	3	0	3	19	11	8	182	136	46	6
(Italy) L'Amatori & Calvisano	6	0	0	6	6	42	−36	58	279	−221	0

=== Pool 2 ===
Team	P	W	D	L	Tries for	Tries against	Try diff	Points for	Points against	Points diff	Pts
(France) Stade Français Paris	6	5	0	1	23	4	19	213	64	149	10
(Ireland) Ulster	6	4	0	2	17	11	6	196	142	54	8
(England) Wasps	6	2	0	4	9	9	0	120	186	−66	4
(Italy) Benetton Treviso	6	1	0	5	2	27	−25	102	239	−137	2

=== Pool 3 ===
Team	P	W	D	L	Tries for	Tries against	Try diff	Points for	Points against	Points diff	Pts
(England) Bath	6	6	0	0	16	2	14	161	56	105	12
(France) Biarritz Olympique	6	2	1	3	11	7	4	104	95	9	5
(Wales) Swansea	6	2	0	4	2	12	−10	92	142	−50	4
(Scotland) Edinburgh Reivers	6	1	1	4	6	14	−8	82	146	−64	3

=== Pool 4 ===
Team	P	W	D	L	Tries for	Tries against	Try diff	Points for	Points against	Points diff	Pts
(France) Castres Olympique	6	5	0	1	19	12	7	179	125	54	10
(Ireland) Munster	6	5	0	1	17	6	11	172	87	85	10
(England) Harlequins	6	2	0	4	14	20	−6	119	187	−68	4
(Wales) Bridgend	6	0	0	6	11	23	−12	116	187	−71	0

=== Pool 5 ===
Team	P	W	D	L	Tries for	Tries against	Try diff	Points for	Points against	Points diff	Pts
(France) Montferrand	6	4	1	1	23	7	16	191	100	91	9
(Wales) Cardiff	6	3	0	3	16	15	1	154	154	0	6
(Scotland) Glasgow Caledonians	6	2	1	3	10	23	−13	126	198	−72	5
(England) Northampton	6	2	0	4	12	16	−4	132	151	−19	4

=== Pool 6 ===
Team	P	W	D	L	Tries for	Tries against	Try diff	Points for	Points against	Points diff	Pts
(Ireland) Leinster	6	5	0	1	15	11	4	139	104	35	10
(Wales) Newport	6	3	0	3	17	13	4	151	146	5	6
(France) Toulouse	6	3	0	3	16	11	5	158	141	17	6
(England) Newcastle	6	1	0	5	8	21	−13	117	174	−57	2

== Seeding ==
Seed	Pool Winners	Pts	TF	+/−
1	(England) Bath	12	16	+105
2	(France) Stade Français Paris	10	23	+149
3	(France) Castres	10	19	+54
4	(England) Leicester Tigers	10	17	+87
5	(Ireland) Leinster	10	15	+35
6	(France) Montferrand	9	23	+91
Seed	Pool Runners-up	Pts	TF	+/−
7	(Ireland) Munster	10	17	+85
8	(Wales) Llanelli	8	22	+88
–	(Ireland) Ulster	8	17	+54
–	(Wales) Newport	6	17	+5
–	(Wales) Cardiff	6	16	0
–	(France) Biarritz Olympique	5	11	+9

== Knockout stage ==
=== Quarter-finals ===
26 January 2002
14:45

Castres (France)	22–21	(France) Montferrand
	Report

Stade Pierre-Antoine
Attendance: 9,500

26 January 2002
15:00

Bath (England)	10–27	(Wales) Llanelli
	Report

Recreation Ground
Attendance: 8,200

26 January 2002
16:15

Stade Francais (France)	14–16	(Ireland) Munster
	Report

Stade Jean-Bouin
Attendance: 12,000

27 January 2002
15:00

Leicester Tigers (England)	29–18	(Ireland) Leinster
	Report

Welford Road
Attendance: 16,249

=== Semi-finals ===
27 April 2002
15:00

Castres (France)	17–25	(Ireland) Munster
	Report

Stade de la Méditerranée
Attendance: 20,400

28 April 2002
15:00

Leicester Tigers (England)	13–12	(Wales) Llanelli
	Report

City Ground
Attendance: 29,849

=== Final ===
25 May 2002
15:00

Leicester Tigers (England)	15–9	(Ireland) Munster
Tries: Murphy 26' m Healey 59' c Con: Stimpson; Pen: Stimpson 70'	Report	Pen: O'Gara (3) 7', 20', 49'

Millennium Stadium, Cardiff
Attendance: 74,600
Referee: Joël Jutge (France)

The Leicester Tigers became the first team to win the competition more than once.
