= Peter McKenna (rugby union) =

Irish author, broadcaster and solicitor (born 1974)

Peter McKenna (born 24 November 1974) is a former Irish Rugby International, author, broadcaster and solicitor.

== Early life ==
McKenna was educated at C.B.C. Monkstown where he played rugby for the school, representing Leinster Schools in 1991 and 1992. He went on to study law in University College Dublin and began playing club rugby in the AIL for Old Belvedere rugby club. In between his time studying and playing in Ireland, McKenna played for North Canterbury in New Zealand in 1994. Upon completion his college work, McKenna qualified as a solicitor.

== Rugby career ==
In 1999, McKenna put his legal career on hold and resumed top level rugby in the now professional game for Leinster Rugby. McKenna played at both wing, full back during his spell with Leinster. Highlights during this period for the province included winning the inaugural Celtic League (then Celtic League) in 2001 and reaching the semi-finals of the Heineken Cup in 2003. McKenna also earned international honours in 2000, playing for Ireland against Argentina in Buenos Aires. He was also a founding member of the Irish Rugby Union Players Union (IRUPA) in 2001, serving as secretary in the union's early days. In 2003, McKenna retired from professional rugby in order to continue his legal career.

== Professional career ==
Since retiring from rugby, McKenna has been a practicing solicitor through his firm McKenna Durcan Solicitors. He continues his association with the professional game by providing legal advice for members of IRUPA.

== Media work ==
He also works as a pundit and commentator for Setanta Sports with their Magners League and Rugby World Cup coverage. In addition to his work as a broadcaster and solicitor, McKenna also wrote a book prior to the 2007 RWC entitled Rugby Explained, which aimed to inform amateurs and rugby novices about the intrinsics of the game.
