= Malcolm O'Kelly =

Irish rugby union player

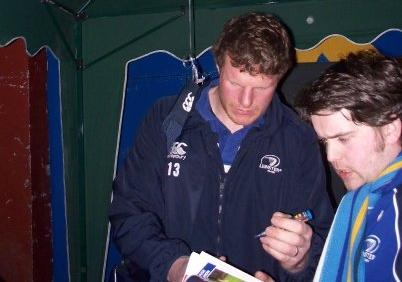
- O'Kelly signing autographs at the RDS, November 2009
- Born: Malcolm O'Kelly; 19 July 1974 (age 52) Chelmsford, Essex, England
- Height: 2.03 m (6 ft 8 in)
- Weight: 119 kg (18 st 10 lb; 262 lb)
- School: Templeogue College
- University: Trinity College

Rugby union career
- Position: Lock
Amateur team(s)
Years	Team	Apps	(Points)
- St Mary's College
Senior career
Years	Team	Apps	(Points)
1995–1997	Leinster	5	(0)
1996–2000	London Irish	56	(25)
1999–2010	Leinster	178	(55)
- Correct as of 29 May 2010
International career
Years	Team	Apps	(Points)
1997–2009	Ireland	92	(40)
2000–2010	Barbarians	4	(5)
2001, 2005	British & Irish Lions	0	(0)
- Correct as of 4 June 2010

Malcolm O'Kelly (born 19 July 1974) is an Irish former rugby union player who played as a lock for Ireland and Leinster.

O'Kelly was born in Chelmsford, England, and attended Templeogue College secondary school in Dublin, Ireland. He has played for the Barbarians FC three times, wearing his old school socks. O'Kelly completed a B.A. in Engineering at Trinity College, Dublin between 1992 and 1996.

The 6-foot-8-inch (2.03 m) O'Kelly, who made his international début in 1997 against New Zealand, became a talisman of the Irish side and became Ireland's most capped player, surpassing Mike Gibson, when he started the 2005 Six Nations fixture against Scotland. He not only earned his 70th cap, but scored Ireland's first try in the match, giving them a lead they never relinquished. O'Kelly's final total of 92 caps was surpassed in 2009 by John Hayes.

O'Kelly also played with the British & Irish Lions on their tour to Australia, and had been named in the Lions squad for their 2005 tour of New Zealand, but aggravated a groin injury in training and was replaced by Simon Shaw. He has five Lions caps.

At the end of the 09/10 season, O'Kelly announced his retirement from professional rugby. He is the only player in the Heineken cup to have played since the start of the competition – 15 years. He has won a grand slam, the Heineken cup, the Magners League(3) and 4 Triple Crowns: he is also Ireland's third most capped second row. As well as that, he is a two time British and Irish Lion.

O'Kelly is a supporter of the children's charity Plan Ireland and is a committee member of the rugby sevens club, Shamrock Warriors RFC.
