= Victor Costello =

Irish rugby union player

- Born: Victor Costello; 23 October 1970 (age 56)
- Height: 1.96 m (6 ft 5 in)
- Weight: 122 kg (19 st 3 lb)
- School: Blackrock College

Rugby union career
- Position(s): Number 8, Blindside flanker
- Current team: retired
Amateur team(s)
Years	Team	Apps	(Points)
1992–1994	Blackrock College		
1994-1996/1997-2005	St. Mary's College		
- Correct as of 11 July 2014
Senior career
Years	Team	Apps	(Points)
1996–1997	London Irish	8	(5)
- Correct as of 11 July 2014
Provincial / State sides
Years	Team	Apps	(Points)
1993–1995	Connacht		
1995-1996/1997-2005	Leinster	121	(80)
- Correct as of 11 July 2014
International career
Years	Team	Apps	(Points)
1996–2004	Ireland	39	(20)
- Correct as of 11 July 2014

Victor Carton Patrick Costello (born 23 October 1970) is a retired Irish rugby union player and Olympic shot-putter.

== Athletics career ==
Costello is a former five-time Irish shot put champion; he finished in 22nd place at the 1992 Summer Olympics in Barcelona.

== Rugby career ==
Playing senior rugby throughout the 1990s until his retirement in 2005, Costello's rugby career with Leinster and Ireland straddled the amateur and professional eras. He was part of the Irish team at the 2003 Rugby World Cup and also had spells with Connacht and London Irish.

=== Irish Rugby player file ===
- Official Leinster caps: 126
- Points scored: 80 (16 tries)
- Celtic League/Cup caps: 38 (5 tries)
- Heineken Cup caps: 57 (5 tries)
- Senior debut: Friendly, 46–11 win v Natal XV at Anglesea Road, 25 October 1995
- Heineken Cup debut: 24–21 win v Milan in Italy, 1 November 1995
- Ireland caps: 39 (January 1996 – 2004)
- Ireland points: 20 (4 tries)
- Ireland "A" caps: 9
- Ireland Under-21 caps: 2
- Ireland Schools caps: 4
- Leinster Under-20/21 caps: 1

== Other work and family ==
Costello provides TV and radio analysis for RTÉ Sport on-field events in major athletics championships, including the 2012 London Olympics. He also works as a pilot for Ryan Air, and is a committee member of the rugby sevens club, Shamrock Warriors. His sister Suzanne is an Irish international hockey player, sprinter and director of the Samaritans (Charity). His father Paddy was also a shot putter and Irish International rugby player, playing second row.
