= Denis Hickie =

Irish rugby union player

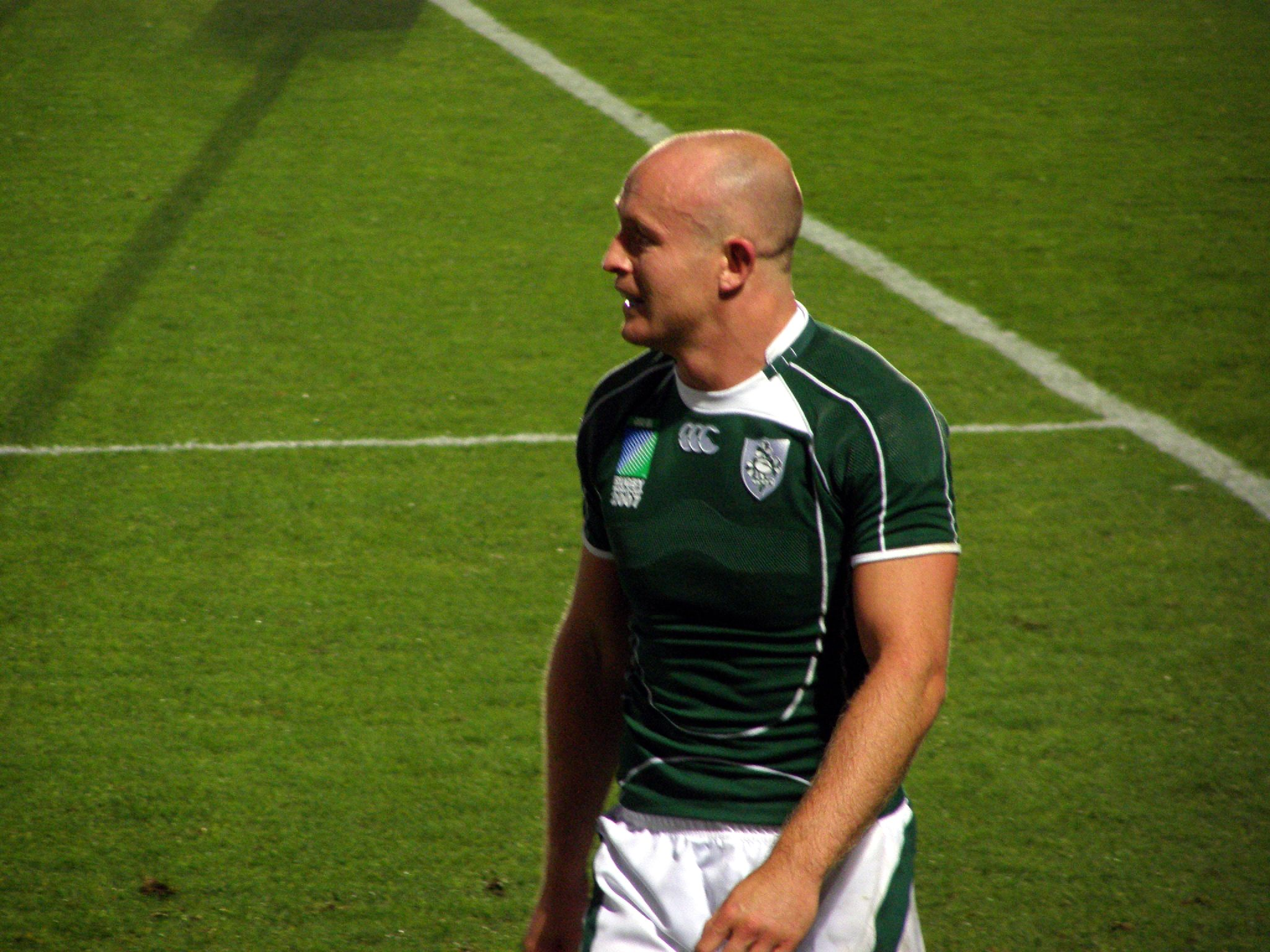
- Born: Denis Hickie; 13 February 1976 (age 50) Dublin, Ireland
- Height: 6 ft 2 in (1.88 m)
- Weight: 14 st 9 lb (93 kg)
- School: St. Mary's College, Dublin
- University: University College Dublin

Rugby union career
- Position: Wing
Amateur team(s)
Years	Team	Apps	(Points)
- UCD RFC,
–	St. Mary’s College		
Provincial / State sides
Years	Team	Apps	(Points)
1996–2007	Leinster Rugby	129	(303)
- Correct as of 2007-03-06
International career
Years	Team	Apps	(Points)
1997–2007	Ireland	62	(145)
2005	British & Irish Lions	1	
- Correct as of 2007-03-06

Denis Anthony Hickie (Irish name: Donnacadh Antoin Ó hIceadh; born 13 February 1976), is a retired professional rugby union player formerly employed by the Irish Rugby Football Union. He played his club rugby for Leinster. His primary position was on the wing. He earned 51 caps for Ireland, scoring 29 tries for Ireland and held the Irish try-scoring record until his Leinster colleague Brian O'Driscoll broke it in 2008.

He is also known as Disco Denis as a result of his quick feet. Other names include Le Hique, Tickets, and DenDen.

== Youth ==
Hickie was educated at St Marys College in Rathmines and led them to the Leinster Schools Senior Cup title in 1994. He went on to university in UCD, where he completed a commerce degree. At UCD Denis was on a dual scholarship for rugby union and athletics.

== Career ==
Hickie made his senior debut for Leinster on 6 September 1996 in a friendly match away to a Genoa President's XV and his senior Irish debut on 1 February 1997 against Wales. He earned 51 caps for Ireland, scoring 29 tries for Ireland and held the Irish try-scoring record until his friend and Leinster colleague Brian O'Driscoll broke it in 2008.

He missed out on selection to the 2001 British & Irish Lions tour to Australia. He overcame a ruptured Achilles tendon sustained during the 2003 World Cup and forced his way back into the Irish line-up, apparently losing nothing of his pace. His solid form in the 2005 Six Nations earned Hickie a call-up for the 2005 British & Irish Lions tour to New Zealand and the Leinster back became a key member of the successful midweek team.

Hickie suffered many injuries throughout his career. In October 2005, in the week coming up to the European Cup, he dislocated his right fibula following a training ground accident and missed the autumn tests. This injury kept him out of the 2005 autumn international series and he subsequently lost his place on the Irish team to Ulster's Andrew Trimble for the duration of 2006, despite his excellent form for Leinster. This was best captured in his try in Leinster's Heineken Cup quarter-final match against Toulouse in France which saw him run the length of the pitch partnered by Gordon D'Arcy to score in the corner. An injury to Trimble saw Hickie retake the number 11 shirt for Ireland against Australia in the 2006 Autumn tests where he scored a notable try, beating four Australian defenders with his trademark 'dancing' footwork. Making the number 11 jersey his own, and scoring two further tries in the 2007 Six Nations, Hickie was first choice left wing for the 2007 World Cup, after which he retired.

Brian O'Driscoll respectfully mentioned Denis & his contribution to Leinster Rugby in his after match interview after the final whistle in the 2009 Heineken Cup Final which Leinster won.

Hickie is a committee member of the rugby sevens club, Shamrock Warriors RFC.

== Miscellaneous ==
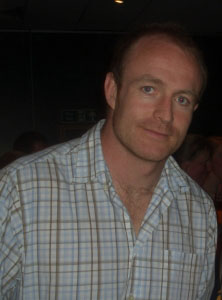
Denis Hickie in 2006

A box in Dublin's popular concert venue, the Olympia Theatre, carries a nameplate "The Denis Hickie Box" as it is where he tends to watch gigs from.

Hickie proved to be a hit when he stood in for Jenny Huston on her Waiting Room show on 2fm on Friday 20 October 2006 from 8pm until 10pm for one night only. He had previously filled in for her when she was on holiday before the summer. An avid music fan, Hickie said, when interviewed by Ireland's Hot Press magazine: "Unfortunately a lot of the people I seem to like are dead now. I’m a huge Elliott Smith fan and I really love Nick Drake’s stuff. Obviously, though, I won’t be seeing them in concert anytime soon."

== Quotes ==
"I’ve always been a Leinster player. My dad played for Leinster, my uncle played for Leinster, my cousin played for Leinster. I’m a Leinster lad. I don’t make any apologies for it. That’s my team."
