= IRFU Interprovincial Championship =

Former Rugby Union competition in Ireland

The IRFU Interprovincial Championship was a rugby union competition between the four provinces of Ireland – Ulster, Leinster, Munster and Connacht – and, for a brief period the Irish Exiles, run by the Irish Rugby Football Union.

== History ==
=== Original competition ===
The Interprovincial Championship, often shortened to the Interpros, was run as a distinct competition from 1946–47 to 2000–01, with the 2001–02 fixtures being fulfilled by the match-ups in the newly formed Celtic League. For a time in the 1980s, the IRFU ruled that Irish diaspora players should play for Connacht, in an attempt to strengthen the weakest of the four provinces. The Irish Exiles took part for four years (1992–93 – 1995–96). Fixture pressure meant the competition ceased after the 2001 edition.

=== URC Irish Shield ===
In 2021, the United Rugby Championship introduced regional shields with the Irish provinces competing for the URC Irish Shield. Initially the pool included results against other non-Irish sides but from 2023 onwards, the URC announced that the regional pool shields of the competition would be decided only by results between the teams within each pool. With this change, the URC effectively reintroduced a form of the Interprovincial Championship for the first time since 2002 (albeit with professional, not representative, teams).

== Championship wins ==
Team	Wins	Years
Ulster	26	1947, 1951, 1952, 1954, 1956*, 1957*, 1967*, 1968, 1970, 1971, 1973, 1975, 1976*, 1977, 1978*, 1983*, 1985, 1986, 1987, 1988*, 1989, 1990, 1991, 1992, 1993, 1994*
Leinster	22	1949, 1950, 1955*, 1957*, 1959, 1961, 1962, 1964, 1965*, 1972, 1973*, 1976*, 1978*, 1980, 1981, 1982, 1983*, 1984, 1994*, 1996, 1998, 2002
Munster	22	1948, 1953, 1955, 1958, 1960, 1963, 1966, 1967*, 1969, 1973*, 1974, 1976*, 1978*, 1979, 1983*, 1988*, 1994*, 1995, 1997, 1999, 2000, 2001
Connacht	3	1955*, 1956*, 1964*
(Ireland) Irish Exiles	0	(best result, runner-up, 1992)
* Denotes that the title was shared. Points difference as tiebreaker was never used in the tournament.

- There was not a full set of matches to complete the competition in 2001–02. The rules for deciding placing used for the Celtic League/Magners League/Pro12 for that season were used to decide the placings in the interpro table.

== Won-lost record ==
Team	P	W	D	L	F	A
Ulster	181	111	14	56	2,687	1,963
Leinster	181	106	12	63	2,691	2,038
Munster	181	100	15	66	2,533	1,928
Connacht	181	23	9	149	1,585	3,350
(Ireland) Exiles	16	5	0	11	282	367

== League placings ==
Team	1st	2nd	3rd	4th	5th
Leinster	20	20	15	1	0
Ulster	20	20	12	4	0
Munster	16	11	23	6	0
Connacht	0	4	6	42	4
(Ireland) Exiles	0	1	0	3	0

== Results ==
=== 1946 ===
Team	P	W	D	L	F	A	Pts
Ulster	3	3	0	0	48	14	6
Leinster	3	1	1	1	28	32	3
Munster	3	1	0	2	27	31	2
Connacht	3	0	1	2	18	44	1

30 October 1946	Ulster	26-3	Connacht	Ravenhill, Belfast
	Try: Todd (2); McCourt (3); Martin; Con: Martin (4)	Report	Pen: Egan	Referee: B V Fox (Leinster)
Ulster: 1. Matthew Neely (Collegians), 2. T Cromey (Collegians), 3. A Thompson (Instonians), 4. ED Bunting (NIFC), 5. Bob Agar (Malone), 6. Herbie Martin (Instonians), 7. Gordon Dudgeon (Collegians), 8. Desmond McCourt (QUB), 9. ND Beattie (Collegians), 10. Jack Kyle (QUB), 11. JA Todd (Instonians), 12. John Harper (Instonians), 13. Deryck Monteith (QUB, c), 14. Des McKee (NIFC), 15. HRH Morrison (QUB).				Referee: B V Fox (Leinster)
Connacht: 1. R Blackwood (TCD), 2. R C Scott (TCD), 3. J Naughton (Corinthians), 4. M Lally (Rovers), 5. P Joyce (Galwegians), 6. M Holland (Corinthians), 7. J Begley (Corinthians), 8. O Goodbody (Corinthians), 9. C Anderson (Corinthians), 10. F Flattery (Corinthians) 11. D McNally (Galwegians), 12. C MacMorrow (Bective Rangers), 13. L O'Brien (Ballinasloe, c), 14. M O'Rourke (Galwegians), 15. B Egan (Galwegians).

9 November 1946	Munster	13-10	Connacht	Thomond Park, Limerick
	Try: Laffan; Riordan; Donovan; Con: Reid (2)	Report	Try: F Joyce; Pen: Egan; Drop: O'Brien
Munster: Munster: 1. A Hoare (UCC), 2. J Donnelly (Sunday's Well), 3. D Donovan (Bohemians), 4. Ernie Keeffe (Sunday's Well), 5. B Laffan (Garryowen), 6. C Roche (Garryowen), 7. Jim McCarthy (Dolphin), 8. C Kirkland (Young Munster), 9. E Murphy (Cork Constitution), 10. Paddy Reid (Garryowen), 11. Bertie O'Hanlon (Dolphin), 12. Mick Lane (UCC), 13. Angus McMorrow (Garryowen), 14. T Riordan (Cork Constitution), 15. J Staunton (Garryowen).
Connacht: 1. J Naughton (Corinthians), 2. R C Scott (TCD), 3. M Lally (Rovers), 4. P Joyce (Galwegians), 5. J. Joyce (Galwegians), 6. M Holland (Corinthians), 7. DB O'Malley (Corinthians), 8. K O'Shaughnessy (UCG), 9. B Egan (Galwegians), 10. L. O'Brien (Ballinasloe), 11. M Quaid (UCG), 12. C McMorrow (Bective Rangers), 13. B Collins (Galwegians), 14. M O'Rourke (Galwegians), 15. J Ward (Corinthians).

23 November 1946	Munster	3-6	Ulster	Musgrave Park, Cork
	Try: Riordan	Report	Try: Harper; McKee
Munster: 1. Jimmy Corcoran (UCC), 2. J Donnelly (Sunday's Well), 3. B Hayes (Cork Constitution), 4. Ernie Keeffe (Sunday's Well), 5. J Twomey (Cork Constitution), 6. C Roche (Garryowen), 7. Chris Daly (London Irish), 8. Jim McCarthy (Dolphin), 9. E Murphy (Cork Constitution), 10. Paddy Reid (Garryowen), 11. Bertie O'Hanlon (Dolphin), 12. Mick Lane (UCC), 13. JJ Staunton (Garryowen), 14. T Riordan (Cork Constitution), 15. G Aherne (Dolphin).
Ulster: 1. Albert McConnell (Collegians), 2. EW Davis (CIYMS), 3. Matthew Neely (Collegians), 4. Bob Agar (Malone), 5. Gordon Dudgeon (Collegians), 6. Desmond McCourt (QUB), 7. Herbie Martin (Instonians), 8. Jimmy Nelson (Malone), 9. Ernie Strathdee (QUB), 10. Jack Kyle (QUB), 11. DS Hyndman (QUB), 12. John Harper (Instonians), 13. Deryck Monteith (QUB, c), 14. Des McKee (NIFC), 15. Dudley Higgins (Civil Service).

23 November 1946	Connacht	5-5	Leinster	The Sports Field, Galway
	Try: McNally; Con: Egan	Report	Try: Walsh; Con: Mullan
Connacht: 1. J Naughton (Corinthians), 2. B Scott (Corinthians), 3. N Lally (Rovers), 4. K Shaughnessy (Galwegians), 5. P Joyce (UCG), 6. O Goodbody (Corinthians), 7. J Joyce (Galwegians), 8. M Holland (Corinthians), 9. J Dillon (Ballinasloe), 10. L O'Brien (Ballinasloe), 11. M Quaid (UCG), 12. D McNally (Galwegians), 13. C McMorrow (Bective Rangers), 14. M O'Rorke (Galwegians), 15. B Egan (Galwegians).
Leinster: 1. M O'Neill (Old Belevdere), 2. Karl Mullen (Old Belvedere), 3. Leslie Griffin (Wanderers), 4. C Walsh (Monkstown), 5. Dick Wilkinson (Wanderers), 6. RE Coolican (Dublin University), 7. J Kehoe (Old Belevdere), 8. D. Kingerty (UCD), 9. B Nolan (Blackrock College), 10. EA Carry (Old Belvedere), 11. Barney Mullan (Clontarf), 12. Kevin Quinn (Old Belevdere), 13. A Creedon (BLackrock College), 14. Brendan Quinn (Old Belvedere), 15. C Murphy (Lansdowne).

30 November 1946	Ulster	16-8	Leinster	Ravenhill, Belfast
	Try: Martin; Dudgeon; Cromey; McKee; Con: Martin (2)	Report	Try: Coolican; Con: Mullan; Pen: Mullan	Referee: MJ Dowlin (Munster)
Ulster: 1. Albert McConnell (Collegians), 2. T Cromey (Collegians), 3. Matthew Neely (Collegians), 4. Bob Agar (Malone), 5. Jimmy Nelson (Malone), 6. Desmond McCourt (QUB), 7. Gordon Dudgeon (Collegians), 8. Herbie Martin (Instonians), 9. Ernie Strathdee (QUB), 10. Jack Kyle (QUB), 11. FA Olver (Instonians), 12. John Harper (Instonians), 13. Deryck Monteith (QUB, c), 14. Des McKee (NIFC), 15. Dudley Higgins (Civil Service).				Referee: MJ Dowlin (Munster)
Leinster: 1. M O'Neill (Old Belevdere), 2. Karl Mullen (Old Belvedere), 3. Leslie Griffin (Wanderers), 4. C Walsh (Monkstown), 5. D Wilkinson (Wanderers), 6. RE Coolican (Dublin University), 7. J Kehoe (Old Belevdere), 8. T Kennedy (Old Belvedere), 9. B Nolan (Blackrock College), 10. EA Carry (Old Belevdere), 11. Barney Mullan (Clontarf), 12. Kevin Quinn (Old Belvedere, 13. A Creedon (BLackrock College), 14. Brendan Quinn (Old Belvedere), 15. C Murphy (Lansdowne, c).

7 December 1946	Leinster	14-11	Munster	Lansdowne Road, Dublin
	Try: Headon; B Quinn; Con: Mullen; Pen: Headon (2)	Report	Try: Lane; O'Hanlon; Con: Reid; Pen: Reid
Leinster: 1. Leslie Griffin (Wanderers), 2. Karl Mullen (Old Belvedere), 3. E Craven (Old Wesley), 4. Dick Wilkinson (Wanderers), 5. C. Callan (Lansdowne), 6. RE Coolican (Dublin University), 7. T Headon (Clontarf), 8. JJ Guiney (Clontarf), 9. B Nolan (Blackrock College), 10. Jack Notley (Wanderers), 11. Barney Mullan (Clontarf), 12. HB McDwyer (Monkstown), 13. Kevin Quinn (Old Belevdere), 14. Brendan Quinn (Old Belvedere), 15. C Murphy (Lansdowne).
Munster: 1. Jimmy Corcoran (UCC), 2. P O'Doherty (Young Munster), 3. B Hayes (Cork Constitution), 4. Ernie Keeffe (Sunday's Well), 5. P Madden (Sunday's Well), 6. C Roche (Garryowen), 7. Chris Daly (London Irish), 8. Jim McCarthy (Dolphin), 9. H de Lacy (Garryowen/Harlequins), 10. Paddy Reid (Garryowen), 11. Bertie O'Hanlon (Dolphin), 12. Mick Lane (UCC), 13. J O'Sullivan (UCC), 14. T Riordan (Cork Constitution), 15. J Harvey (UCC). Replacement: M O'Dea (Garryowen).

=== 1947 ===
Team	P	W	D	L	F	A	Pts
Munster	3	2	1	0	44	20	5
Ulster	3	1	2	0	25	6	4
Leinster	3	1	1	1	26	14	3
Connacht	3	0	0	3	3	58	0

1 November 1947	Leinster	15-0	Connacht	Lansdowne Road, Dublin
	Try: Notley; Ball; Quinn (2); Pen: Quinn	Report
Leinster: 1. Leslie Griffin (Wanderers), 2. J Aherne (Monkstown), 3. Hugh Dolan (Blackrock College), 4. C Walsh (Monkstown), 5. W Linehan (UCD); 6. J Joy (Blackrock College), 7. J McAuliffe (UCD), 8. R Ball (UCD), 9. Tom Cullen (UCD), 10. Jack Notley (Wanderers), 11. B Mullan (Clontarf), 12. Kevin Quinn (Old Belvedere), 13. A Creedon (Blackrock College), 14. L Hoffman (Blackrock College), 15. George Norton (Bective Rangers).
Connacht: 1. R Blackburn (TCD), 2. R C Scott (Ballina), 3. J Naughton (Corinthians), 4. P Joyce (UCG) 5. J Joyce (Galwegians), 6. M Holland (Galwegians), 7. J Begley (Roscommon), 8. G Mitchell (Corinthians), 9. J Geoghegan (Galwegians) 10. J Horan (UCG), 11. B Devlin (Corinthians), 12. HO Anderson (Galwegians), 13. P Collins (Galwegians), 14. M Brennan (Corinthians), 15. A Foley (UCG).

1 November 1947	Ulster	8-8	Munster	Ravenhill, Belfast
	Try: Monteith; Des McKee; Con: McKibbin	Report	Try: Lane; Con: Reid; Pen: Clifford
Ulster: 1. Des McKibbin (QUB), 2. TA Cromey (Collegians), 3. Albert McConnell (Collegians), 4. Jimmy Nelson (Malone), 5. R StG Gallaher (London Irish), 6. WDO Rollins (NIFC), 7. Herbie Martin (Instonians), 8. Desmond McCourt (QUB), 9. Ernie Strathdee (QUB), 10. Jack Kyle (QUB), 11. J Pigott (QUB), 12. HR Morrison (QUB), 13. Deryck Monteith (QUB, c), 14. Des McKee (NIFC), 15. Dudley Higgins (Civil Service).
Munster: 1. Tom Clifford (Young Munster), 2. J Donnelly (Sunday's Well), 3. B Hayes (Cork Constitution), 4. P Keane (Young Munster), 5. P Madden (Sunday's Well), 6. C Roche (Garryowen), 7. Ernie Keeffe (Sunday's Well, c), 8. Jim McCarthy (Dolphin), 9. R O'Dea (Garryowen), 10. Paddy Reid (Garryowen), 11. Mick Lane (UCC), 12. J O'Sullivan (UCC), 13. G Ahern (Dublin), 14. Bertie O'Hanlon (Dolphin), 15. J Staunton (Garryowen).

6 November 1947	Connacht	0-19	Ulster	The Sports Field, Galway
		Report	Try: McKee; Strathdee; Hill (2); Nelson; Con: McKibbin (2)
Connacht: 1. R Blackburn (TCD), 2. R C Scott (Ballina), 3. J Naughton (Corinthians), 4. P Joyce (UCG) 5. J Joyce (Galwegians), 6. P Sweeney (Corinthians), 7. M Nolan (Galwegians), 8. M Holland (Galwegians), 9. B Egan (Galwegians), 10. J Horan (UCG), 11. B Devlin (Corinthians), 12. HO Anderson (Galwegians), 13. P Collins (Galwegians), 14. M Brennan (corinthians), 15. A Foley (UCG).
Ulster: 1. Des McKibbin (QUB), 2. EW Davis (CIYMS), 3. Albert McConnell (Collegians), 4. Jimmy Nelson (Malone), 5. Bob Agar (Malone), 6. Herbie Martin (Instonians), 7. Gordon Dudgeon (Collegians), 8. Desmond McCourt (QUB), 9. Ernie Strathdee (QUB), 10. WD Evans (Collegians, 11. J Pigott (QUB), 12. FA Olver (Instonians), 13. Des McKee (NIFC), 14. WA Hill (Collegians), 15. Dudley Higgins (Civil Service).

15 November 1947	Leinster	0-0	Ulster	Lansdowne Road, Dublin
		Report
Leinster: 1. Leslie Griffin (Wanderers), 2. Karl Mullen (Old Belvedere), 3. Hugh Dolan (Blackrock College), 4. Dick Wilkinson (Wanderers), 5. Des O'Brien (London Irish), 6. T Halpenny (Lansdowne), 7. K Keenan (Blackrock College), 8. R Ball (UCD), 9. Tom Cullen (UCD), 10. Jack Notley (Wanderers), 11. L Hoffman (Blackrock College), 12. Kevin Quinn (Old Belvedere), 13. A Creedon (Blackrock College), 14. Kevin O'Flanaghan (London Irish), 15. Jack Mattson (Wanderers).
Ulster: 1. H StG Gallaher (London Irish), 2. TA Cromey (Collegians), 3. Albert McConnell (Collegians), 4. Jimmy Nelson (Malone), 5. Bob Agar (Malone), 6. Herbie Martin (Instonians), 7. Gordon Dudgeon (Collegians), 8. Desmond McCourt (QUB), 9. Ernie Strathdee (QUB), 10. Jack Kyle (QUB), 11. WA Hill (Collegians), 12. John Harper (Instonians) 13. FA Olver (Instonians), 14. Des McKee (NIFC), 15. Dudley Higgins (Civil Service).

15 November 1947	Connacht	3-24	Munster	The Sports Field, Galway
	Try: Murphy	Report	Try: Lane; McCarthy (3); McElhinney; Con: Reid (3); Pen: Reid
Connacht: 1. R Blackburn (TCD), 2. RC Scott (Ballina), 3. J Naughton (Corinthians), 4. N Lally (Rovers), 5. J Langan (Corinthians), 6. M Holland (Galwegians), 7. M Nolan (Galwegians), 8. P O'Flaherty (Corinthians), 9. J Geoghegan (Galwegians), 10. J Horan (UCG), 11. P Murphy (UCG), 12. HO Anderson (Galwegians, c), 13. P Collins (Galwegians), 14. M Brennan (Corinthians), 15. A Foley (UCG).
Munster: 1. B Hayes (Cork Constitution), 2. J Donnelly (Sunday's Well), 3. Tom Clifford (Young Munster), 4. P Keane (Young Munster), 5. P Madden (Sunday's Well), 6. F Dineen (Bohemians), 7. Ernie Keeffe (Sunday's Well, c), 8. Jim McCarthy (Dolphin), 9. R O'Dea (Garryowen), 10. A McElhinney (Dolphin), 11. Mick Lane (UCC), 12. Paddy Reid (Garryowen), 13. J Mackessy (Cork Constitution), 14. JJ O'Sullivan (UCC), 15. J Staunton (Garryowen).

22 November 1947	Munster	14-11	Leinster	Thomond Park, Limerick
	Try: O'Sullivan (2); O'Hanlon; Con: Reid; Pen: Reid	Report	Try: Halpenny; Cullen; Con: Mattson; Pen: Mattson
Munster: 1. B Hayes (Cork Constitution), 2. J Donnelly (Sunday's Well), 3. J Corcoran (UCC), 4. P O'Kane (Young Munster), 5. Ernie Keeffe (Sunday's Well, c), 6. Jim McCarthy (Dolphin), 7. P Madden (Sunday's Well), 8. T Reid (Garryowen), 9. H de Lacy (Harlequins/Garryowen), 10. A McElhinney (Dolphin), 11. JJ O'Sullivan (UCC), 12. J Mackessy (Cork Constitution), 13. Paddy Reid (Garryowen), 14. Bertie O'Hanlon (Dolphin), 15. J Staunton (Garryowen).
Leinster: 1. Leslie Griffin (Wanderers), 2. Karl Mullen (Old Belvedere), 3. Hugh Dolan (Blackrock College), 4. Dick Wilkinson (Wanderers), 5. C Walsh (Monkstown), 6. T Halpenny (Lansdowne), 7. KJ Keenan (Blackrock College), 8. C O'Doherty (Blackrock College), 9. Tom Cullen (UCD), 10. Jack Notley (Wanderers), 11. L Hoffman (Blackrock College), 12. T Burke (Blackrock College), 13. D Orr (TCD), 14. A Gill (Wanderers), 15. Jack Mattson (Wanderers).

=== 1948-49 ===
Team	P	W	D	L	F	A	Pts
Leinster	3	3	0	0	17	0	6
Ulster	3	2	0	1	43	20	4
Munster	3	1	0	2	26	25	2
Connacht	3	0	0	3	12	53	0

10 November 1948	Ulster	30-6	Connacht	Ravenhill, Belfast
	Try: McKee (4); Harper; Martin; J. Kyle; Henderson; Con: Martin; Murphy (2)	Report	Pen: Foley (2)	Referee: JD O'Connor (Leinster)
Ulster: 1. Albert McConnell (Collegians), 2. TA Cromey (Collegians), 3. Gordon Dudgeon (Collegians), 4. J. B. Stevenson (Instonians), 5. Jimmy Nelson (c, Malone), 6. Ewart Bell (Collegians), 7. D Ingram (Instonians), 8. Herbie Martin (Instonians), 9. Eric Kyle (NIFC), 10. Jack Kyle (QUB), 11. B Warke (Instonians), 12. Noel Henderson (QUB), 13. John Harper (Instonians), 14. Des McKee (NIFC), 15. Gerry Murphy (Dublin University).				Referee: JD O'Connor (Leinster)
Connacht: 1. M Kennedy (Corinthians), 2. R Scott (Ballina), 3. R Blackburn (c, Dublin University), 4. D Flynn (Galwegians), 5. G Langan (Corinthians), 6. M O'Flaherty (Corinthians), 7. C Clancy (St Mary's), 8. J Heffernan (Ballina), 9. M Cox (Bective Rangers), 10. B Collins (Galwegians), 11. S Sweeney (Ballinasloe), 12. V Lane (Corinthians), 13. P Ryan (Westport), 14. M Brennan (Corinthians), 15. A Foley (UCG).

20 November 1948	Munster	6-13	Ulster	Thomond Park, Limerick
	Try: McCarthy; Pen: Dennehy	Report	Try: Harper; J. Kyle; Con: Higgins (2); Pen: Higgins	Referee: N. H. Lambert (Leinster)
Munster: 1. P. O'Kane (Young Munster), 2. D. Healy (Dolphin), 3. Tom Clifford (Young Munster), 4. P. Madden (Sunday's Well), 5. Archie O'Leary (Cork Constitution), 6. C. Roche (Garryowen), 7. Tom Reid (Lansdowne/Garryowen), 8. Jim McCarthy (Dolphin), 9. Hugh de Lacy (Harlequins, c), 10. W. O'Regan (UCC), 11. A. Nicholson (Dolphin), 12. Bertie O'Hanlon (Dolphin), 13. R. Dennehy (Dolphin), 14. Mick Lane (UCC), 15. G. Aherne (Dolphin).				Referee: N. H. Lambert (Leinster)
Ulster: 1. Gordon Dudgeon (Collegians), 2. TA Cromey (Collegians), 3. Albert McConnell (Collegians), 4. Jimmy Nelson (Malone), 5. Bob Agar (Malone), 6. Bill McKay (QUB), 7. Ewart Bell (Collegians), 8. Desmond McCourt (QUB), 9. Eric Kyle (NIFC), 10. Jack Kyle (QUB), 11. JSY Matthewson (QUB), 12. Deryck Monteith (Malone), 13. John Harper (Instonians), 14. WA Hill (Collegians), 15. Dudley Higgins (Civil Service).

20 November 1948	Connacht	0-3	Leinster	The Sports Field, Galway
		Report	Pen: B. Mullan	Referee: M. Dowling (Munster)
Connacht: 1. D Flynn (Galwegians), 2. R Scott (Ballina), 3. R Blackburn (c, Dublin University), 4. G Langan (Corinthians), 5. J Holland (Galwegians), 6. M O'Flaherty (Corinthians), 7. C Clancy (St Mary's), 8. M Kennedy (Corinthians), 9. S Dillon (Ballinasloe), 10. B Collins (Galwegians), 11. S Sweeney (Ballinasloe), 12. M Cog (Bective Rangers), 13. V Lane (Corinthians), 14. M Brennan (Corinthians), 15. A Foley (UCG).				Referee: M. Dowling (Munster)

27 November 1948	Leinster	6-0	Munster	Lansdowne Road, Dublin
		Report

4 December 1948	Ulster	0-5	Leinster	Ravenhill, Belfast
		Report	Try: Hackett; Con: Mullan
Ulster: 1. Des McKibbin (QUB), 2. TA Cromey (Collegians), 3. Albert McConnell (Collegians), 4. Jimmy Nelson (Malone), 5. Bob Agar (Malone), 6. Herbie Martin (Instonians), 7. Ewart Bell (Collegians), 8. Desmond McCourt (QUB), 9. Ernie Strathdee (QUB), 10. Jack Kyle (QUB), 11. JS Mathewson (QUB), 12. Deryck Monteith (Malone), 13. John Harper (Instonians), 14. Harry Millar (QUB), 15. Dudley Higgins (Civil Service).
Leinster: 1. L Griffen (Wanderers), 2. K Mullen (Old Belvedere), 3. L Warke (Dublin University), 4. MP Corrigan (St. Mary's), 5. R Fitzgerald (Palmerston), 6. T O'Brien (Bective Rangers), 7. D O'Brien (London Irish), 8. TG Davis (Dublin University), 9. T. Cullen (UCD), 10. JD Jackett (UCD), 11. B. Mullan (Clontarf), 12. K. Quinn (London Irish), 13. M. O'Flanagan (Lansdowne), 14. A. Gill (Wanderers), 15. G Norton (Bective Rangers).

9 January 1949	Munster	20-6	Connacht	Mardyke, Cork
		Report

=== 1949 ===
Team	P	W	D	L	F	A	Pts
Leinster	3	2	1	0	42	16	5
Ulster	3	2	0	1	23	11	4
Munster	3	1	1	1	9	19	3
Connacht	3	0	0	3	11	49	0

29 October 1949	Connacht	5-6	Munster	The Sports Field, Galway
		Report

12 November 1949	Ulster	11-0	Munster	Ravenhill, Belfast
	Try: Henderson; Bell; Con: McKibbin; Pen: McKibbin	Report
Ulster lineup: 1. Des McKibbin (Instonians, 2. Fuzzy Anderson (QUB), 3. Gordon Dudgeon (Collegians), 4. Jimmy Nelson (Malone), 5. Bob Agar (Malone), 6. Bill McKay (QUB), 7. George Ross (CIYMS), 8. Ewart Bell (Collegians), 9. Ernie Strathdee (QUB), 10. Jack Kyle (QUB), 11. JSY Matthewson (QUB), 12. FA Olver (Instonians), 13, Noel Henderson (QUB), 14. Des McKee (NIFC), 15. Dudley Higgins (Civil Service).
Munster lineup: 1. T Clifford (Young Munster), 2. J Corcoran (Sunday's Well), 3. P O'Kane (Young Munster), 4. A O'Leary (Cork Constitution), 5. J Keyes (Garryowen), 6. M Madden (Sunday's Well), 7. E Keeffe (Sunday's Well), 8. JS McCarthy (Dolphin, c), 9. D Barry (Cork Constitution), 10. W O'Regan (UCC), 11. B O'Hanlon (Dolphin), 12. G Aherne (Lansdowne/Dolphin), 13. J O'Sullivan (Cork Constitution), 14. MF Lane (UCC), 15. D. Daly (Sunday's Well).

10 November 1949	Leinster	31-3	Connacht	Lansdowne Road, Dublin
		Report

25 November 1949	Connacht	3-12	Ulster	Lansdowne Road, Dublin
	Try: McNally	Report	Try: Strathdee; Pen: McKibbin (3)
Connacht: 1. P Callan (UCD), 2. R Flynn (Galwegians), JD Clancy (London Irish), 4. J Joyce (Galwegians), C Langan (Corinthians), 6. M Kennedy (Corinthians), M Crosby (Ballinasloe), M O'Flaherty (UCG).; 9. S Dillon (Ballinasloe), 10. C McMorrow (Terenure), 11. J Costello (Galwegians), 12. M Cox (Bective Rangers), 13. V Lane (Bohemians), 14. D McNally (Galwegians), 15. A McMorrow (Garryowen).
Ulster: 1. Des McKibbin (Instonians), 2. Fuzzy Anderson (QUB), 3. Gordon Dudgeon (Collegians), 4. Jimmy Nelson (Malone), 5. Bob Agar (Malone), 6. Bill McKay (QUB), 7. Herbie Martin (Instonians), 8. Ewart Bell (Collegians), 9. Ernie Strathdee (QUB), 10. Jack Kyle (QUB), 11. JSY Matthewson (QUB), 12. FA Olver (Instonians), 13. Noel Henderson (QUB), 14. Harry Millar (QUB), 15. Gerry Murphy (Dublin University).

26 November 1949	Munster	3-3	Leinster	Mardyke, Cork
		Report

3 December 1949	Leinster	6-3	Ulster	Lansdowne Road, Dublin
	Pen: Quinn; Norton	Report	Try: Millar
Leinster: 1. L Warke (Dublin University), 2. R Roe (Dublin University), 3. W O'Neill (Lansdowne), 4. R Fitzgerald (Palmerston), 5. J Molony (UCD), 6. TG Davis (Dublin University), DJ O'Brien (London Irish), 8. DPW Kelly (London Irish/Royal Navy), 9. R Carroll (Lansdowne), KP Quinn (Old Belvedere), 11. LC Crowe (Old Belvedere), 12. B Mullen (UCD), 13. JD Blayney (Wanderers), 14. M Hillary (UCD), 15. G Norton (Bective Rangers, c).
Ulster: 1. Des McKibbin (Instonians), 2. TA Cromey (Collegians), 3. Fuzzy Anderson (QUB), 4. Jimmy Nelson (Malone), 5. James Stevenson, 6. Bill McKay (QUB), 7. Gordon Dudgeon (Collegians), 8. George Ross (CIYMS), 9. Ernie Strathdee (QUB, c), 10. Jack Kyle (QUB), 11. JSY Matthewson (QUB), 12. RR Chambers (QUB), 13. Noel Henderson (QUB), 14. Harry Millar (QUB), 15. Gerry Murphy (Dublin University).

=== 1950 ===
Team	P	W	D	L	F	A	Pts
Ulster	3	3	0	0	42	9	6
Munster	3	1	0	2	21	22	2
Leinster	3	1	0	2	17	26	2
Connacht	3	1	0	2	21	44	2

28 October 1950	Munster	12-8	Connacht	Thomond Park, Limerick
		Report

9 November 1950	Connacht	10-6	Leinster	The Sports Field, Galway
		Report

11 November 1950	Munster	3-6	Ulster	Mardyke, Cork
		Report

22 November 1950	Ulster	26-3	Connacht	Ravenhill, Belfast
		Report

25 November 1950	Leinster	8-6	Munster	Lansdowne Road, Dublin
		Report

2 December 1950	Ulster	10-3	Leinster	Ravenhill, Belfast
		Report

=== 1951 ===
Team	P	W	D	L	F	A	Pts
Ulster	3	3	0	0	46	17	6
Leinster	3	2	0	1	65	29	4
Munster	3	1	0	2	40	31	2
Connacht	3	0	0	3	6	80	0

25 October 1951	Connacht	3-28	Munster	The Sports Field, Galway
		Report

1 November 1951	Leinster	39-3	Connacht	Lansdowne Road, Dublin
		Report

3 November 1951	Ulster	16-3	Munster	Ravenhill, Belfast
		Report

8 November 1951	Connacht	0-13	Ulster	The Sports Field, Galway
		Report

10 November 1951	Munster	9-12	Leinster	Mardyke, Cork
		Report

17 November 1951	Leinster	14-17	Ulster	Lansdowne Road, Dublin
		Report

=== 1952 ===
Team	P	W	D	L	F	A	Pts
Munster	3	2	1	0	11	0	5
Ulster	3	2	1	0	45	14	5
Leinster	3	1	0	2	11	28	2
Connacht	3	0	0	3	11	36	0

25 October 1952	Munster	8-0	Connacht	Thomond Park, Limerick
		Report

6 November 1952	Connacht	8-0	Leinster	The Sports Field, Galway
		Report

8 November 1952	Munster	0-0	Ulster	Thomond Park, Limerick
		Report

19 November 1952	Ulster	28-3	Connacht	Ravenhill, Belfast
		Report

22 November 1952	Leinster	0-3	Munster	Lansdowne Road, Dublin
		Report

20 December 1952	Ulster	17-11	Leinster	Ravenhill, Belfast
		Report

=== 1953 ===
Team	P	W	D	L	F	A	Pts
Ulster	3	2	0	1	20	14	4
Leinster	3	1	1	1	34	17	3
Munster	3	1	1	1	11	9	3
Connacht	3	1	0	2	20	45	2

29 October 1953	Connacht	3-11	Ulster	The Sports Field, Galway
		Report

5 November 1953	Leinster	34-14	Connacht	Lansdowne Road, Dublin
		Report

7 November 1953	Ulster	6-11	Munster	Ravenhill, Belfast
		Report

14 November 1953	Leinster	0-3	Ulster	Lansdowne Road, Dublin
		Report

21 November 1953	Munster	0-0	Leinster	Thomond Park, Limerick
		Report

3 December 1953	Connacht	3-0	Munster	The Sports Field, Galway
		Report

=== 1954 ===
Team	P	W	D	L	F	A	Pts
Leinster	3	2	0	1	19	15	4
Munster	3	2	0	1	17	14	4
Connacht	3	1	0	2	20	20	2
Ulster	3	1	0	2	12	19	2

29 October 1954	Munster	8-3	Connacht	Musgrave Park, Cork
		Report

11 November 1954	Connacht	3-6	Leinster	The Sports Field, Galway
		Report

13 November 1954	Munster	0-3	Ulster	Musgrave Park, Cork
		Report

24 November 1954	Ulster	6-14	Connacht	Ravenhill, Belfast
		Report

27 November 1954	Leinster	8-9	Munster	Lansdowne Road, Dublin
		Report

11 December 1954	Ulster	3-5	Leinster	Ravenhill, Belfast
		Report

=== 1955 ===
Team	P	W	D	L	F	A	Pts
Ulster	3	2	0	1	36	21	4
Connacht	3	2	0	1	23	23	4
Munster	3	1	0	2	20	21	2
Leinster	3	1	0	2	24	38	2

27 October 1955	Connacht	3-8	Munster	The Sportsground, Galway
		Report

9 November 1955	Leinster	6-8	Connacht	Dublin
		Report

12 November 1955	Ulster	6-3	Munster	Ravenhill, Belfast
		Report

24 November 1955	Connacht	12-9	Ulster	The Sportsground, Galway
		Report

26 November 1955	Munster	9-12	Leinster	Musgrave Park, Cork
		Report

10 December 1955	Leinster	9-21	Ulster	Lansdowne Road, Dublin
		Report

=== 1956 ===
Team	P	W	D	L	F	A	Pts
Leinster	3	2	0	1	44	29	4
Ulster	3	2	0	1	25	15	4
Connacht	3	2	0	1	19	25	4
Munster	3	0	0	3	15	34	0

3 November 1956	Connacht	10-3	Munster	Musgrave Park, Cork
		Report

10 November 1956	Munster	3-5	Ulster	Thomond Park, Limerick
		Report

10 November 1956	Connacht	3-19	Leinster	The Sportsground, Galway
		Report

21 November 1956	Ulster	3-6	Connacht	Ravenhill, Belfast
		Report

24 November 1956	Leinster	19-9	Munster	Lansdowne Road, Dublin
		Report

8 December 1956	Ulster	17-6	Leinster	Ravenhill, Belfast
		Report

=== 1957 ===
Team	P	W	D	L	F	A	Pts
Munster	3	3	0	0	33	18	6
Ulster	3	2	0	1	53	36	4
Leinster	3	1	0	2	34	46	2
Connacht	3	0	0	3	15	35	0

26 October 1957	Connacht	0-3	Munster	The Sportaground, Galway
		Report

30 October 1957	Leinster	9-3	Connacht	Lansdowne Road, Dublin
		Report

2 November 1957	Ulster	8-11	Munster	Ravenhill, Belfast
		Report

9 November 1957	Munster	19-12	Leinster	Musgrave Park, Cork
		Report

16 November 1957	Leinster	13-24	Ulster	Lansdowne Road, Dublin
		Report

14 December 1957	Connacht	12-23	Ulster	The Sportsground, Galway
		Report

=== 1958 ===
Team	P	W	D	L	F	A	Pts
Leinster	3	3	0	0	57	15	6
Connacht	3	1	0	2	17	23	2
Ulster	3	1	0	2	25	36	2
Munster	3	1	0	2	15	40	2

25 October 1958	Munster	9-0	Connacht	Thomond Park, Limerick
		Report

6 November 1958	Connacht	3-9	Leinster	The Sportaground, Galway
		Report

19 November 1958	Ulster	5-14	Connacht	Ravenhill, Belfast
		Report

22 November 1958	Leinster	32-0	Munster	Lansdowne Road, Dublin
		Report

30 November 1958	Munster	6-8	Ulster	Musgrave Park, Cork
		Report

13 December 1958	Ulster	12-16	Leinster	Ravenhill, Belfast
		Report

=== 1959 ===
Team	P	W	D	L	F	A	Pts
Munster	3	3	0	0	42	14	6
Leinster	3	1	1	1	33	27	3
Ulster	3	1	0	2	15	37	2
Connacht	3	0	1	2	6	18	1

21 October 1959	Leinster	3-3	Connacht	Lansdowne Road, Belfast
		Report

29 October 1959	Connacht	0-6	Munster	The Sportsground, Galway
		Report

14 November 1959	Ulster	0-18	Munster	Ravenhill, Belfast
		Report

28 November 1959	Connacht	3-9	Ulster	The Sportsground, Galway
		Report

28 November 1959	Munster	18-14	Leinster	Thomond Park, Limerick
		Report

12 December 1959	Leinster	16-6	Ulster	Landowne Road, Dublin
		Report

=== 1960 ===
Team	P	W	D	L	F	A	Pts
Leinster	3	1	2	0	23	18	4
Ulster	3	1	1	1	23	18	3
Connacht	3	1	1	1	6	8	3
Munster	3	1	0	2	17	25	2

3 November 1960	Connacht	0-0	Leinster	The Sportaground, Galway
		Report

5 November 1960	Munster	3-11	Ulster	Thomond Park, Limerick
	Try: McNamee (2); D. Hewitt; Con: Glass	Report	Try: McGrath

16 November 1960	Ulster	3-6	Connacht	Ravenhill, Belfast
	Try: J. Hewitt	Report	Pen: Dooley (2)

19 November 1960	Leinster	14-9	Munster	Lansdowne Road, Dublin
		Report

3 December 1960	Munster	5-0	Connacht	Musgrave Park, Cork
		Report

10 December 1960	Ulster	9-9	Leinster	Ravenhill, Belfast
	Try: J. Hewitt; Pen: Moffett; Drop: Armstrong	Report	Try: Brophy; Drop: R. Kanavagh; S. Cooke

=== 1961 ===
Team	P	W	D	L	F	A	Pts
Leinster	3	3	0	0	27	15	6
Ulster	3	2	0	1	40	11	4
Munster	3	1	0	2	17	35	2
Connacht	3	0	0	3	12	35	0

1 November 1961	Leinster	13-9	Connacht	Lansdowne Road, Dublin
		Report

4 November 1961	Ulster	26-3	Munster	Ravenhill, Belfast
	Try: Gilpin; Lappin; J. Dick; D. Hewitt; Pedlow; Con: J. Hewitt (3); D. Hewitt	Report	Drop: Hennessy

16 November 1961	Connacht	0-11	Ulster	The Sportsground, Galway
		Report	Try: J. Dick; D. Hewitt; Con: D. Hewitt; Pen: D. Hewitt

18 November 1961	Munster	3-6	Leinster	Cork
		Report

7 December 1961	Connacht	3-11	Munster	The Sportsground, Galway
		Report

9 December 1961	Leinster	8-3	Ulster	Lansdowne Road, Dublin
	Try: L'Estrange; Mulcahy; Con: Cross	Report	Try: Gilpin

=== 1962 ===
Team	P	W	D	L	F	A	Pts
Munster	3	3	0	0	31	6	6
Ulster	3	2	0	1	30	25	4
Leinster	3	1	0	2	32	42	2
Connacht	3	0	0	3	23	43	0

25 October 1962	Connacht	17-18	Leinster	The Sportsground, Galway
		Report

3 November 1962	Leinster	6-14	Munster	Lansdowne Road, Dublin
		Report

7 November 1962	Ulster	19-6	Connacht	Ravenhill, Belfast
		Report

24 November 1962	Munster	11-0	Ulster	Musgrave Park, Cork
		Report

1 December 1962	Munster	6-0	Connacht	Thomond Park, Limerick
		Report

8 December 1962	Ulster	11-8	Leinster	Ravenhill, Belfast
		Report

=== 1963 ===
Team	P	W	D	L	F	A	Pts
Leinster	3	3	0	0	33	20	6
Munster	3	1	1	1	18	18	3
Connacht	3	1	0	2	27	26	2
Ulster	3	0	1	2	11	25	1

24 October 1963	Connacht	8-12	Munster	The Sportsground, Galway
		Report

2 November 1963	Leinster	11-6	Connacht	Lansdowne Road, Dublin
		Report

9 November 1963	Ulster	0-0	Munster	Ravenhill, Belfast
		Report

21 November 1963	Connacht	13-3	Ulster	The Sportsfield, Galway
		Report

23 November 1963	Munster	6-10	Leinster	Musgrave Park, Cork
		Report

4 January 1964	Leinster	12-8	Ulster	Lansdowne Road, Dublin
		Report

=== 1964 ===
Team	P	W	D	L	F	A	Pts
Leinster	3	1	2	0	28	17	4
Ulster	3	1	1	1	21	17	3
Munster	3	1	1	1	17	27	3
Connacht	3	0	2	1	11	16	2

29 October 194	Connacht	6-6	Leinster	The Sportsground, Galway
		Report

7 November 1964	Munster	9-8	Ulster	Thomond Park, Limerick
		Report

18 November 1964	Ulster	5-0	Connacht	Ravenhill, Belfast
		Report

21 November 1964	Leinster	14-3	Munster	Lansdowne Road, Dublin
		Report

5 December 1964	Munster	5-5	Connacht	Musgrave Park, Cork
		Report

12 December 1964	Ulster	8-8	Leinster	Ravenhill, Belfast
		Report

=== 1965 ===
Team	P	W	D	L	F	A	Pts
Munster	3	3	0	0	28	12	6
Leinster	3	2	0	1	24	18	4
Ulster	3	0	1	2	15	24	1
Connacht	3	0	1	2	12	25	1

Leinster	13-6	Connacht

Munster	9-3	Connacht

Munster	6-3	Leinster

Munster	13-6	Ulster

Leinster	8-6	Ulster

Connacht	3-3	Ulster

=== 1966 ===
Team	P	W	D	L	F	A	Pts
Munster	3	2	1	0	24	14	5
Ulster	3	2	1	0	20	17	5
Leinster	3	1	0	2	37	20	2
Connacht	3	0	0	3	17	47	0

Connacht	8-9	Ulster

Ulster	8-6	Leinster

Ulster	3-3	Munster

Leinster	5-9	Munster

Connacht	6-12	Munster

Leinster	26-3	Connacht

=== 1967 ===
Team	P	W	D	L	F	A	Pts
Ulster	3	3	0	0	36	23	6
Leinster	3	2	0	1	37	25	4
Munster	3	1	0	2	22	30	2
Connacht	3	0	0	3	32	49	0

Leinster	24-11	Connacht

Munster	11-9	Connacht

Munster	5-8	Leinster

Munster	6-13	Ulster

Leinster	5-9	Ulster

Ulster	14-12	Connacht

=== 1968 ===
Team	P	W	D	L	F	A	Pts
Munster	3	3	0	0	43	20	6
Ulster	3	2	0	1	34	34	4
Leinster	3	1	0	2	31	34	2
Connacht	3	0	0	3	18	38	0

2 November 1968	Connacht	6-15	Leinster	The Sportsground, Galway

9 November 1968	Munster	17-9	Ulster	Musgrave Park, Cork
	Try: Murphy; Tydings; Con: Moroney; Pen: Moroney (3)		Pen: Marshall (3)

23 November 1968	Ulster	11-9	Connacht	Ravenhill, Belfast
	Try: Kennedy; Williamson; Con: Marshall; Pen: Marshall	Report	Try: Flannery; Pen: O'Driscoll (2)

31 November 1968	Leinster	8-14	Munster	Lansdowne Road, Dublin

7 December 1968	Munster	12-3	Connacht	Thomond Park, Limerick

14 December 1968	Ulster	14-8	Leinster	Ravenhill, Belfast
	Try: Goodall; Con: Marshall; Pen: Marshall (2); Drop: Marshall		Try: Moloney; Con: Macken; Pen: Macken

=== 1969 ===
Team	P	W	D	L	F	A	Pts
Ulster	3	2	1	0	29	6	5
Leinster	3	2	0	1	41	18	4
Munster	3	1	1	1	31	15	3
Connacht	3	0	0	3	6	68	0

2 November 1968	Leinster	26-6	Connacht	Lansdowne Road, Dublin

8 November 1969	Ulster	3-3	Munster	Ravenhill, Belfast
	Pen: McCombe	Report	Try: Buckey

22 November 1969	Connacht	0-20	Ulster	The Sportsground, Galway
		Report	Try: Rea; Brown; Gibson; Young; Con: Jackson; Pen: Young (2)

6 December 1969	Munster	6-12	Leinster	Musgrave Park, Cork

13 December 1969	Connacht	0-22	Munster	The Sportsground, Galway

20 December 1969	Leinster	3-6	Ulster	Lansdowne Road, Dublin
	Try: Rowell	Report	Try: Brown; Drop: Gibson

=== 1970 ===
Team	P	W	D	L	F	A	Pts
Ulster	3	3	0	0	56	6	6
Leinster	3	2	0	1	24	9	4
Munster	3	1	0	2	12	18	2
Connacht	3	0	0	3	3	62	0

Ulster	42-0	Connacht

Ulster	6-3	Leinster

Ulster	8-3	Munster

Leinster	10-0	Munster

Connacht	0-9	Munster

Leinster	11-3	Connacht

=== 1971 ===
Team	P	W	D	L	F	A	Pts
Leinster	3	3	0	0	33	16	6
Ulster	3	2	0	1	36	18	4
Munster	3	1	0	2	16	22	2
Connacht	3	0	0	3	6	35	0

Leinster	12-6	Connacht

Munster	10-0	Connacht

Munster	0-9	Leinster

Munster	6-13	Ulster

Leinster	12-10	Ulster

Ulster	13-0	Connacht

=== 1972 ===
Team	P	W	D	L	F	A	Pts
Ulster	3	2	0	1	47	20	4
Munster	3	2	0	1	32	16	4
Leinster	3	2	0	1	33	23	4
Connacht	3	0	0	3	9	62	0

Ulster	37-6	Connacht

Ulster	6-11	Leinster

Ulster	4-3	Munster

Leinster	9-17	Munster

Connacht	3-12	Munster

Leinster	13-0	Connacht

=== 1973 ===
Team	P	W	D	L	F	A	Pts
Munster	3	2	1	0	48	16	5
Leinster	3	2	0	1	43	39	4
Ulster	3	1	1	1	36	40	3
Connacht	3	0	0	3	34	66	0

Leinster	20-13	Connacht

Munster	29-7	Connacht

Munster	13-3	Leinster

Munster	6-6	Ulster

Leinster	20-13	Ulster

Ulster	17-14	Connacht

=== 1974 ===
Team	P	W	D	L	F	A	Pts
Ulster	3	2	1	0	57	21	5
Leinster	3	2	0	1	30	31	4
Munster	3	0	2	1	18	21	2
Connacht	3	0	1	2	15	47	1

Ulster	29-6	Connacht

Ulster	22-9	Leinster

Ulster	6-6	Munster

Leinster	9-6	Munster

Connacht	6-6	Munster

Leinster	12-3	Connacht

=== 1975 ===
Team	P	W	D	L	F	A	Pts
Munster	3	2	0	1	32	15	4
Leinster	3	2	0	1	23	18	4
Ulster	3	2	0	1	24	26	4
Connacht	3	0	0	3	9	29	0

Leinster	7-0	Connacht

Munster	16-6	Connacht

Munster	9-0	Leinster

Munster	7-9	Ulster

Leinster	16-9	Ulster

Ulster	6-3	Connacht

=== 1976 ===
Team	P	W	D	L	F	A	Pts
Ulster	3	3	0	0	76	48	6
Leinster	3	2	0	1	54	45	4
Munster	3	1	0	2	43	45	2
Connacht	3	0	0	3	16	47	0

30 October 1976	Leinster	12-6	Munster	Lansdowne Road, Dublin
		Report

12 November 1976	Ulster	13-3	Connacht	Ravenhill, Belfast
		Report

20 November 1976	Munster	13-6	Connacht	Musgrave Park, Cork
		Report

27 November 1976	Ulster	6-12	Leinster	Ravenhill, Belfast
		Report

11 December 1976	Munster	24-27	Ulster	Thomond Park, Limerick
		Report

20 December 1976	Connacht	7-21	Leinster	The Sportsground, Galway
		Report

=== 1977 ===
Team	P	W	D	L	F	A	Pts
Leinster	3	2	0	1	69	42	4
Ulster	3	2	0	1	45	38	4
Munster	3	2	0	1	31	25	4
Connacht	3	0	0	3	18	58	0

29 October 1977	Munster	15-10	Leinster

5 November 1977	Connacht	3-18	Ulster

18 November 1977	Munster	6-10	Ulster

19 November 1977	Connacht	6-10	Munster

26 November 1977	Leinster	29-18	Ulster

10 December 1977	Leinster	30-9	Connacht

=== 1978 ===
Team	P	W	D	L	F	A	Pts
Munster	3	3	0	0	42	12	6
Leinster	3	2	0	1	25	21	4
Ulster	3	1	0	2	20	24	2
Connacht	3	0	0	3	13	43	0

28 October 1978	Ulster	11-4	Connacht

18 November 1978	Munster	19-3	Connacht

25 November 1978	Ulster	3-9	Leinster

9 December 1978	Munster	11-6	Ulster

8 December 1978	Connacht	6-13	Leinster

17 December 1978	Leinster	3-12	Munster

=== 1979 ===
Team	P	W	D	L	F	A	Pts
Leinster	3	3	0	0	47	25	6
Connacht	3	1	1	1	36	47	3
Munster	3	1	0	2	34	35	2
Ulster	3	0	1	2	29	39	1

27 October 1979	Connacht	20-16	Munster

27 October 1979	Leinster	18-12	Ulster

17 November 1979	Ulster	11-15	Munster

24 November 1979	Leinster	25-10	Connacht

8 December 1979	Munster	3-4	Leinster

15 December 1979	Connacht	6-6	Ulster

=== 1980 ===
Team	P	W	D	L	F	A	Pts
Leinster	3	3	0	0	75	27	6
Munster	3	2	0	1	46	28	4
Ulster	3	1	0	2	32	72	2
Connacht	3	0	0	3	21	47	0

1 November 1980	Connacht	9-18	Leinster

8 November 19080	Munster	21-10	Ulster
		Report

15 November 1980	Ulster	13-12	Connacht
		Report

22 November 1980	Leinster	18-9	Munster

13 December 1980	Ulster	9-39	Leinster
		Report

13 December 1980	Munster	16-0	Connacht

=== 1981 ===
Team	P	W	D	L	F	A	Pts
Leinster	3	2	1	0	54	31	5
Ulster	3	2	0	1	30	38	4
Munster	3	1	1	1	52	51	3
Connacht	3	0	0	3	31	47	0

24 October 1981	Ulster	18-16	Munster

24 October 1981	Leinster	20-10	Connacht

28 November 1981	Connacht	18-21	Munster

28 November 1981	Leinster	19-6	Ulster

5 December 1981	Munster	15-15	Leinster

5 December 1981	Connacht	3-6	Ulster	The Sportsground, Galway

=== 1982 ===
Team	P	W	D	L	F	A	Pts
Leinster	3	2	0	1	34	25	4
Ulster	3	2	0	1	50	46	4
Munster	3	2	0	1	28	32	4
Connacht	3	0	0	3	35	44	0

23 October 1982	Ulster	22-21	Connacht	Ravenhill
	Try: Matthews; Carr; Brady; Con: Goodrich (2); Pen: O'Donnell	Report	Try: Eoin Lysaght; Con: Brendan Moran; Pen: Brendan Moran (5)
Ulster: 1. I. Johnston (Collegians), 2. Steve Smith (Ballymena), 3. D. Wallace (Ballymena), 4. John Rogers (Bangor) 5. C. Morrison (CIYMS), 6. Phillip Matthews (QUB), 7. Nigel Carr (QUB), 8. Willie Anderson (Dungannon), 9. Rab Brady (QUB), 10. Adrian Goodrich (Ballymena), 11. Kenny Hooks (QUB), 12. Roy Palmer (Collegians), 13. David Irwin (Instonians), 14. Trevor Ringland (Ballymena), 15. Paul O'Donnell (London Irish).
Connacht: 1. T. Healy (Shannon), 2. C. Fitzgerald (St Mary's), 3. H. McGuire (St. Mary's), 4. Mick Moylett (Manchester), 5. D. Grennan (Clontarf), 6. N. Hogan (Ballinasloe), 7. M. Smyth (London Irish), 8. P. Finn (Ballinasloe), 9. R. McGrath (Wanderers), 10. H. Condon (London Irish), 11. C. Hitchcock (UCG), 12. J. O'Connell (Corinthians), 13. D. Howard (St Mary's), 14. Eoin Lysaght (Blackrock), 15. Brendan Moran (Waterpark). Replacement: E. O'Flynn (Corinthians, for O'Connell 60')

23 October 1982	Leinster	6-9	Munster	Lansdowne Road
		Report

13 November 1982	Ulster	9-15	Leinster	Ravenhill
	Pen: Palmer (2); Goodrich	Report	Try: Campbell; Con: Campbell; Pen: Campbell (2); Drop: Campbell
Ulster: 1. D. Wallace (Ballymena), 2. Steve Smith (Ballymena), 3. I. Johnston (Collegians), 4. Brian McCall (London Irish), 5. John Rogers (Bangor), 6. Phillip Matthews (QUB), 7. Nigel Carr (QUB), 8. Willie Anderson (Dungannon), 9. R. Stewart (Collegians), 10. Adrian Goodrich (Ballymena, c), 11. Kenny Hooks (QUB), 12. Roy Palmer (Collegians), 13. David Irwin (Instonians), 14. Trevor Ringland (Ballymena), 15. Paul O'Donnell (London Irish). Replacement: John Hewitt (NIFC, for O'Donnell 22')
Leinster: 1. Philip Orr (Old Wesley), 2. J. Cantrell (Blackrock), 3. M. Fitzpatrick (Wanderers), 4. George Wallace (Old Wesley), 5. Jim Glennon (Skerries), 6. Fergus Slattery (Blackrock), 7. Ronan Kearney (Wanderers), 8. Declan Fanning (St Mary's), 9. Sammy Lyons (Old Belvedere), 10. Ollie Campbell (Old Belvedere), 11. S. Doyle (Greystones), 12. Paul Dean (St Mary's), 13. I. Finnegan (Bective Rangers), 14. Paul Haycock (Terenure), 15. Hugo MacNeill (Oxford University).

13 November 1982	Munster	9-7	Connacht	Thomond Park
		Report

27 November 1982	Munster	10-19	Ulster	Musgrave Park, Cork
	Try: Tucker; Pen: Barry (2)	Report	Try: Crossan; Irwin; Goodrich; Con: Goodrich (2); Pen: Goodrich
Munster: 1. N. Ryan (Shannon), 2. P. Derham (Cork Constitution), 3. G. McLoughlin (Shannon), 4. Donal Lenihan (Cork Constitution), 5. Moss Keane (Lansdowne), 6. C. Cantillon (Cork Constitution), 7. Colm Tucker (Shannon), 8. Tony O'Leary (Cork Constitution, c), 9. Alex O'Regan (St Mary's), 10. Tony Ward (St Mary's), 11. Declan Aherne (Dolphin), 12. P. Cross (Young Munster), 13. Mike Kiernan (Dolphin), 14. Moss Finn (Cork Constitution), 15. John Barry (Bohemians).
Ulster: 1. D. Wallace (Ballymena), 2. Steve Smith (Ballymena), 3. J.J. McCoy (Dungannon), 4. Brian McCall (London Irish), 5. John Rogers (Bangor), 6. Phillip Matthews (QUB), 7. Nigel Carr (QUB), 8. Willie Anderson (Dungannon), 9. Willie Oakes (Instonians), 10. Adrian Goodrich (Ballymena, c), 11. Keith Crossan (Instonians), 12. John Hewitt (NIFC), 13. David Irwin (Instonians), 14. Trevor Ringland (Ballymena), 15. Roy Palmer (Collegians).

27 November 1982	Connacht	7-13	Leinster	Galway Sportsgrounds
		Report

=== 1983 ===
Team	P	W	D	L	F	A	Pts
Leinster	3	3	0	0	71	35	6
Munster	3	1	0	2	54	32	2
Ulster	3	1	0	2	33	41	2
Connacht	3	1	0	2	22	62	2

12 November 1983	Connacht	7-29	Munster	Galway Sportsgrounds
	Try: O'Flynn; Pen: Moran	Report	Try: Bradley; O'Sullivan; Kiernan; Barry; Ward; Con: Ward (3); Pen: Ward

12 November 1983	Ulster	16-20	Leinster	Donnybrook, Dublin
	Try: Crowe; Ringland; Con: O'Donnell; Pen: O'Donnell (2)	Report	Try: Kearney; McGeady (2); Con: Murphy; Pen: Murphy (2)
Leinster: 1. P. Orr (Old Wesley), 2. Harry Harbison (Bective Rangers), 3. Des Fitzgerald, 4. J. George Wallace (Old Wesley), 5. J. Glennon (Skerries), 6. Ronan Kearney (Wanderers), 7. D. Fanning (St Mary's), 8. D. McGrath (UCD), 9. T. Doyle (Greystones), 10. B. Murphy (Bective Rangers), 11. John McGeady (Lansdowne), 12. Brendan Mullin (Dublin University), 13. R. Moroney (Lansdowne), 14. Paul Haycock (Terenure, c), 15. John Murphy (Greystones).
Ulster: 1. D. Wallace (Ballymena), Steve Smith (Ballymena), 3. J. J. McCoy (Dungannon), 4. John Rogers (Bangor), 5. Brian McCall (London Irish), 6. Davy Morrow (Bangor), 7. Ian Crowe (City of Derry), 8. Willie Anderson (Dungannon), 9. Willie Oakes (Instonians), 10. Alan Irwin (Instonians), 11. Keith Crossan (Instonians), 12. David Irwin (Instonians, c), 13. Roy Palmer (Collegians), 14. Trevor Ringland (Ballymena), 15. Paul O'Donnell (London Irish).

26 November 1983	Leinster	29-6	Connacht	Donnybrook, Dublin
	Try: McGeady; Harbison; Mullin (2); Con: Murphy (2); Pen: Murphy (3)	Report	Pen: Moran (2)

26 November 1983	Ulster	13-12	Munster	Ravenhill, Belfast
	Try: Crossan; Pen: Brown; Palmer (2)	Report	Try: Sexton; Con: Ward; Pen: Barry; Finn
Ulster: 1. D. Wallace (Ballymena), Steve Smith (Ballymena), 3. J. J. McCoy (Dungannon), 4. John Rogers (Bangor), 5. Brian McCall (London Irish), 6. Davy Morrow (Bangor), 7. Ian Crowe (City of Derry), 8. Willie Anderson (Dungannon), 9. Rab Brady (Queen's University), 10. Ian Brown (Malone), 11. Keith Crossan (Instonians), 12. Alan Irwin (Instonians), 13. David Irwin (Instonians, c), 14. Trevor Ringland (Ballymena), 15. Roy Palmer (Collegians).
Munster: 1. T. Mulcahy (Bohemians), 2. P. Derham (Cork Constitution), 3. B. O'Brien (Highfield), 4. B. Foley (Shannon), 5. Donal Lenihan (Cork Constitution), 6. Willie Sexton (Garryowen), 7. P. O'Hara (Sundays Well), 8. A. O'Leary (Cork Constitution), 9. Michael Bradley, 10. Tony Ward (St Mary's), 11. Moss Finn (Cork Constitutions), 12. P. Cross (Young Munster), 13. Mike Kiernan (Dolphin), 14. Eddie O'Sullivan (Garryowen), 15. John Barry (Cork Constitution).

22 October 1983	Connacht	9-4	Ulster	Galway Sportsgrounds
	Pen: Moran (2); Drop: Smith	Report	Try: A. Irwin
Connacht: 1. Tom Clancy, B. Deegan (Wanderers), 3. H. McGuire (St Mary's), 4. J. Healy (Galwegians), 5. Mick Moylett (Shannon), 6. J. Noone (Corinthians), 7. J. Mannion (St Mary's), 8. H. O'Donoghue (London Irish), 9. R. McGrath (Wanderers), 10. Ciaran Smyth (Corinthians, c), 11. F. O'Flynn (Corinthians), 12. D. Howard (St Mary's), 13. H. Condon (London Irish), 14. E. Lysaght (Blackrock), 15. Brendan Moran (Waterpark).
Ulster: 1. A. Campbell (Collegians), Steve Smith (Ballymena), 3. J. J. McCoy (Dungannon), 4. John Rogers (Bangor), 5. Brian McCall (London Irish), 6. Davy Morrow (Bangor), 7. Phillip Matthews (Queen's University), 8. Willie Anderson (Dungannon), 9. Willie Oakes (Instonians), 10. Alan Irwin (Instonians), 11. Keith Crossan (Instonians), 12. David Irwin (Instonians, c), 13. Roy Palmer (Collegians), 14. Trevor Ringland (Ballymena), 15. Paul O'Donnell (London Irish).

22 October 1983	Munster	13-22	Leinster	Thomond Park, Limerick
	Try: O'Leary; Pen: Ward (3)	Report	Try: Haycock; Kearney; Con: Murphy; Pen: Murphy (3); Drop: Murphy

=== 1984 ===
Team	P	W	D	L	F	A	Pts
Ulster	3	3	0	0	58	15	6
Leinster	3	2	0	1	32	28	4
Munster	3	1	0	2	30	38	2
Connacht	3	0	0	3	18	57	0

27 October 1984	Ulster	16-3	Leinster	Ravenhill, Belfast
	Try: Matthews; Pen: Brown (2); Drop: Brown (2)	Report	Pen: Murphy
Ulster: 1. P. Kennedy (London Irish), John MacDonald (Malone), 3. J. J. McCoy (Dungannon), 4. John Whitten (Instonians), 5. Willie Anderson (Dungannon), 6. Phillip Matthews (Ards), 7. Willie Duncan (Malone), 8. Davy Morrow (Bangor), 9. Rab Brady (Queen's University), 10. Ian Brown (Malone), 11. Keith Crossan (Instonians), 12. Ian Moles (Ards), 13. David Irwin (Instonians, c), 14. Terry McMaster (Bangor), 15. Philip Rainey (Landowne).
Leinster: 1. Philip Orr (Old Wesley), 2. Harry Harbison (Bective Rangers), 3. Des Fitzgerald, 4. J. George Wallace (Old Wesley), 5. Jim Glennon (Skerries), 6. R. Kearney (Wanderers), 7. Dick Spring (Lansdowne), 8. D. McGrath (UCD), 9. A. O'Regan (St Mary's), 10. Mick Quinn (Lansdowne), 11. J. McGeady (Lansdowne), 12. Paul Dean (St. Mary's), 13. Brendan Mullin (Dublin University), 14. Paul Haycock (Terenure), 15. John Murphy (Greystones).

27 October 1984	Connacht	3-23	Munster	Galway Sportsgrounds
	Pen: Hernon	Report	Try: Quilligan (3); Hyland; Con: Danaher (2); Pen: Danaher

24 November 1984	Ulster	28-6	Connacht	Ravenhill, Belfast
	Try: McCall; Matthews; Ringland; Rainey; Con: Brown (3); Pen: Brown (2)	Report	Pen: Quaid (2)
Ulster: 1. P. Kennedy (London Irish), John MacDonald (Malone), 3. J. J. McCoy (Dungannon), 4. Brian McCall (London Irish) 5. Willie Anderson (Dungannon), 6. Willie Duncan (Malone), 7. Phillip Matthews (Ards), 8. Nigel Carr (Ards), 9. Rab Brady (Queen's University), 10. Ian Brown (Malone), 11. Keith Crossan (Instonians), 12. Ian Moles (Ards), 13. David Irwin (Instonians), 14. Trevor Ringland (Ballymena), 15. Philip Rainey (Landowne). Replacement: Steve Smith (Ballymena, for MacDonald).
Connacht: 1. Tom Clancy, B. Deegan (Wanderers), 3. M. MacClancy (Old Belvedere), 4. Michael Tarpey (St Mary's), 5. J. Healy (Galwegians), 6. J. McShane (St Mary's), 7. Declan Greaney (Corinthians), 8. P. Finn (Galwegians), 9. Conor McCarthy (UCG, c), 10. C. Smyth (Corinthians, c), 11. F. O'Flynn (Corinthians), 12. Colin Hitchcock (Galwegians), 13. M. Feeley (Old Belvedere), 14. Brendan Moran (Wanderers), 15. Mick Quaid (Galwegians). Replacement: V. Ryan (Lansdowne, for Finn).

24 November 1984	Leinster	15-9	Munster	Lansdowne Road, Dublin
	Try: Wallace; Moroney; Con: Murphy; Quinn; Pen: Quinn	Report	Try: Sexton; Con: Ward; Pen: Ward

8 December 1984	Munster	6-14	Ulster	Thomond Park, Limerick
	Try: O'Kelly; Con: Ward	Report	Try: Ringland (2); Pen: Brown; Drop: Brown
Munster: 1. T. Hennessy (London Irish), 2. P. Derham (Cork Constitution), 3. G. McLoughlin (Shannon), 4. Donal Lenihan (Cork Constitution), 5. F. Kearney (Sundays Well), 6. P. Collins (Highfied), 7. W. Sexton (Garryowen), 8. B. Spillane (Bohemians), 9. Michael Bradley, 10. Tony Ward (St Mary's), 11. D. Aherne (Young Munster), 12. Mike Kiernan (Dolphin), 13. O'Neill (Waterpark), 14. Ger O'Kelly (Dolphin), 15. John Barry (Cork Constitution).
Ulster: 1. P. Kennedy (London Irish), John MacDonald (Malone), 3. J. J. McCoy (Dungannon), 4. Brian McCall (London Irish), 5. Willie Anderson (Dungannon), 6. Nigel Carr (Ards), 7. Willie Duncan (Malone), 8. Davy Morrow (Bangor), 9. Rab Brady (Queen's University), 10. Ian Brown (Malone), 11. Keith Crossan (Instonians), 12. Ian Moles (Ards), 13. David Irwin (Instonians), 14. Trevor Ringland (Ballymena), 15. Philip Rainey (Landowne).

8 December 1984	Connacht	3-14	Leinster	Galway Sportsgrounds
	Try: Kearney; McGrath; Dean; Con: Murphy	Report	Pen: Quaid

=== 1985 ===
Team	P	W	D	L	F	A	Pts
Ulster	3	3	0	0	54	22	6
Leinster	3	1	0	2	34	34	2
Munster	3	1	0	2	24	34	2
Connacht	3	1	0	2	25	47	2

9 November 1985	Ulster	23-3	Munster	Ravenhill, Belfast
	Try: Cowan; Matthews; Crossan (2); Con: Brown (2); Pen: Brown	Report	Drop: Keyes
Ulster: 1. P. Kennedy (London Irish), John MacDonald (Malone), 3. J. J. McCoy (Bangor), 4. Willie Anderson (Dungannon), 5. John Whitten (Instonians), 6. Phillip Matthews (Ards), 7. Willie Duncan (Malone), 8. Davy Morrow (Bangor), 9. Stephen Cowan (Malone), 10. Ian Brown (Malone), 11. Keith Crossan (Instonians), 12. John Hewitt (NIFC), 13. David Irwin (Instonians), 14. Trevor Ringland (Ballymena), 15. Philip Rainey (Ballymena).
Munster: 1. T. Hennessy (London Irish), 2. P. Derham (Cork Constitution), 3. T. Mulcahy (Bohemians), 4. Donal Lenihan (Cork Constitution), 5. F. Kearney (Sundays Well), 6. P. Collins (Highfied), 7. W. Sexton (Garryowen), 8. B. Spillane (Bohemians), 9. Michael Bradley, 10. Ralph Keyes (Cork Constitution), 11. D. Aherne (Young Munster), 12. F. Brosnahan (Young Munster) 13. Mike Kiernan (Dolphin), 14. J. Crotty (UCC), 15. John Barry (Cork Constitution).

9 November 1985	Leinster	6-9	Connacht	Lansdowne Road, Dublin
	Try: MacNeill; Con: Murphy	Report	Pen: O'Toole (3)

23 November 1985	Munster	6-15	Leinster	Musgrave Park, Cork
	Pen: Kiernan (2)	Report	Try: Clinch; Con: Murphy; Pen: Murphy (3)

23 November 1985	Connacht (Leinster)	6-16	Ulster	Galway Sportsgrounds
	Pen: O'Donnell (2)	Report	Try: Crossan (2); Morrow; Con: Brown (2)
Connacht: 1. Tom Clancy, B. Deegan (Wanderers), 3. M. MacClancy (Old Belvedere), 4. Michael Tarpey (St Mary's), 5. Mick Moylett (Shannon), 6. Declan Greaney (Corinthians), 7. John O'Driscoll (London Irish), 8. Noel Mannion (Corinthians), 9. Conor McCarthy (UCG, c), 10. Hugh Condon (London Irish), 11. Colin Hitchcock (Galwegians), 12. J. Daly (Lansdowne), 13. Ray Hernon (UCD), 14. F. O'Flynn (Corinthians), 15. Brian O'Donnell (Galwegians). Replacements: Joe Healy (Galwegians, for Mannion), Ciaran Smyth (Corinthians, for Hernon).
Ulster: 1. P. Kennedy (London Irish), John MacDonald (Malone), 3. J. J. McCoy (Bangor), 4. Colin Morrison (CIYMS), 5. Willie Anderson (Dungannon, c), 6. John Whitten (Instonians), 7. Willie Duncan (Malone), 8. Davy Morrow (Bangor), 9. Stephen Cowan (Malone), 10. Ian Brown (Malone), 11. Keith Crossan (Instonians), 12. John Hewitt (NIFC), 13. David Irwin, 14. Trevor Ringland (Ballymena), 15. Paul O'Donnell (London Irish). Replacement: Roger Anderson (London Irish, for Irwin).

7 December 1985	Leinster	13-19	Ulster	Lansdowne Road, Dublin
	Try: Hopkins; Mullin; Con: Hopkins; Pen: Hopkins	Report	Try: Morrow; Moles; Con: Brown; Pen: Rainey (2); Brown
Leinster: 1. Philip Orr (Old Wesley), 2. Harry Harbison (Bective Rangers), 3. Des Fitzgerald, 4. J. Holland (Wanderers), 5. A. Blair (Old Wesley), 6. R. Kearney (Wanderers), 7. D. McGrath (Old Belvedere), 8. D. Fanning (St. Mary's, c), 9. Tony Doyle (Greystones), 10. Paul Dean (St. Mary's), 11. Paul Haycock (Terenure), 12. Paul Clinch (Dublin University), 13. Brendan Mullin (Oxford University), 14. John Sexton, 15. Ray Hopkins (Terenure).
Ulster: 1. J. Kennedy (London Irish), John MacDonald (Malone), 3. J. J. McCoy (Bangor), 4. Willie Anderson (Dungannon, c), 5. Brian McCall (London Irish), 6. Phillip Matthews (Ards), 7. Willie Duncan (Malone), 8. Davy Morrow (Bangor), 9. Rab Brady (Ballymena), 10. Ian Brown (Malone), 11. Keith Crossan (Instonians), 12. John Hewitt (NIFC), 13. Ian Moles (Ards), 14. Trevor Ringland (Ballymena), 15. Philip Rainey (Ballymena). Replacement: Stephen Cowan (Malone, for Crossan).

7 December 1985	Connacht	9-16	Munster	Galway Sportsgrounds
	Try: Noel McCarthy; Con: O'Toole; Pen: O'Toole	Report	Try: Brosnihan; Pen: Keyes (4)

=== 1986 ===
Team	P	W	D	L	F	A	Pts
Ulster	3	3	0	0	68	24	6
Leinster	3	2	0	1	68	23	4
Connacht	3	1	0	2	23	87	2
Munster	3	0	0	3	18	43	0

25 October 1986	Munster	6-17	Ulster	Musgrave Park, Cork
	Pen: Barry (2)	Report	Try: MacDonald; Crossan; Pen: Brown; Drop: Brown (2)
Munster: 1. P. McCarthy (Dolphin), 2. Terry Kingston (Dolphin), 3. J, Fitzgerald (Young Munster), 4. Donal Lenihan (Cork Constitution), 5. Richard Costello (Old Crescent), 6. Pat O'Hara (Sundays Well), 7. W. Sexton (Garryowen), 8. M. Gibson (London Irish), 9. Michael Bradley, 10. Ralph Keyes (Cork Constitution), 11. J. Crotty (Dolphin), 12. Mike Kiernan (Dolphin), 13. Moss Finn (Cork Constitution), 14. G. O'Kelly (Dolphin), 15. John Barry (Cork Constitution).
Ulster: 1. P. Millar (Ballymena), John MacDonald (Malone), 3. J. J. McCoy (Bangor), 4. Willie Anderson (Dungannon), 5. Colin Morrison (Malone), 6. Nigel Carr (Ards), 7. Willie Duncan (Malone), 8. Davy Morrow (Bangor), 9. Rab Brady (Ballymena), 10. Ian Brown (Malone), 11. Keith Crossan (Instonians), 12. John Hewitt (NIFC), 13. David Irwin (Instonians), 14. Trevor Ringland (Ballymena), 15. Philip Rainey (Ballymena).

25 October 1986	Connacht	6-41	Leinster	Galway Sportsgrounds
	Pen: Moran (2)	Report	Try: Ryan; Dean; Fanning; MacNeill; Ward; Mullin; Con: Ward (4); Pen: Ward (2); Drop: Mullin

8 November 1986	Ulster	37-6	Connacht	Ravenhill, Belfast
	Try: Irwin (3); Ringland; Duncan; Morrison; Rainey (2); Con: Brown; Pen: Brown	Report	Pen: Moran; Drop: Dunne
Ulster: 1. A. Millar (Ballymena), John MacDonald (Malone), 3. J. J. McCoy (Bangor), 4. Willie Anderson (Dungannon), 5. Colin Morrison (Malone), 6. Willie Duncan (Malone), 7. Nigel Carr (Ards), 8. Phillip Matthews (Wanderers), 9. Rab Brady (Ballymena), 10. Ian Brown (Malone), 11. Keith Crossan (Instonians), 12. Bill Harbinson (Malone), 13. David Irwin (Instonians), 14. Trevor Ringland (Ballymena), 15. Philip Rainey (Ballymena). Replacement: Davy Morrow (Bangor, for Duncan).
Connacht: 1. Tom Clancy, B. Deegan (Wanderers), 3. M. MacClancy (Old Belvedere), 4. Mick Moylett (Shannon), 5. Michael Tarpey (St Mary's), 6. Mick Fitzgibbon (Dublin University), 7. Noel Mannion (Corinthians), 8. John O'Driscoll (London Irish). 9. C. McCarthy (UCG, c), 10. Collie Dunne (Wanderers), 11. Colin Hitchcock (Galwegians), 12. Michael Cosgrave (Wanderers), 13. L. Mulcahy (Terenure), 14. Brendan Moran (Waterpark), 15. H. O'Toole (Corinthians). Replacements: G. Mullen (Corinthians, for Cosgrave), P. Kiely (Athlone, for Hitchcock).

8 November 1986	Leinster	15-3	Munster	Lansdowne Road, Dublin
	Pen: Ward (3); Murphy; Drop: Murphy	Report	Pen: Kiernan

22 November 1986	Ulster	14-12	Leinster	Ravenhill, Belfast
	Try: Duncan; Crossan; Pen: Brown; Drop: Brown	Report	Pen: Ward (3); Drop: Ward
Ulster: 1. P. Millar (Ballymena), John MacDonald (Malone), 3. J. J. McCoy (Bangor), 4. Willie Anderson (Dungannon), 5. Colin Morrison (Malone), 6. Willie Duncan (Malone), 7. Nigel Carr (Ards), 8. Phillip Matthews (Wanderers), 9. Rab Brady (Ballymena), 10. Ian Brown (Malone), 11. Keith Crossan (Instonians), 12. Bill Harbinson (Malone), 13. David Irwin (Instonians), 14. Trevor Ringland (Ballymena), 15. Philip Rainey (Ballymena). Replacement: Colin Wilkinson (Malone, for Rainey).
Leinster: 1. P. Orr (Old Wesley), 2. Harry Harbison (Bective Rangers), 3. Des Fitzgerald, 4. Neil Francis (Blackrock), 5. J. Glennon (Skerries), 6. P. Collins (Lansdowne), 7. R. Kearney (Wanderers), 8. D. Fanning (St. Mary's), 9. T. Doyle (Greystones), 10. Paul Dean (St. Mary's), 11. Paul Haycock (Terenure), 12. Tony Ward (Greystones), 13. Brendan Mullin (Oxford University), 14. T. Kennedy (St. Mary's), 15. Hugo MacNeill (London Irish). Replacements: John Murphy (Greystones, for Dean), S. O'Beirne (UCD, for Haycock).

22 November 1986	Munster	9-11	Connacht	Thomond Park, Limerick
	Try: Murray; Con: Kiernan; Pen: Kiernan	Report	Try: Fitzgibbon; Mulcahy; Pen: Moran

=== 1987 ===
Team	P	W	D	L	F	A	Pts
Ulster	3	2	1	0	52	22	5
Munster	3	2	1	0	37	25	5
Leinster	3	1	0	2	32	51	2
Connacht	3	0	0	3	34	57	0

24 October 1987	Ulster	10-10	Munster	Ravenhill, Belfast
	Try: Irwin; Pen: Russell; Drop: Russell	Report	Try: Kearney; Pen: Kiernan (2)
Ulster: 1. Brian McKibbin (Instonians), John MacDonald (Malone), 3. J. J. McCoy (Bangor), 4. Willie Anderson (Dungannon), 5. J. Rogers (Bangor), 6. Willie Duncan (Malone), 7. Don Whittle (Bangor), 8. Davy Morrow (Bangor), 9. Rab Brady (Ballymena), 10. Peter Russell (Instonians), 11. Keith Crossan (Instonians), 12. Bill Harbinson (London Irish), 13. David Irwin (Instonians), 14. Trevor Ringland (Ballymena), 15. Philip Rainey (Ballymena).
Munster: 1. J. Fitzgerald (Young Munster), 2. Terry Kingston (Dolphin), 3. Peter Clohessy (Young Munster), 4. Donal Lenihan (Cork Constitution), 5. Finbarr Kearney (Sundays Well), 6. Colm Tucker (Shannon), 7. N. O'Donovan (Shannon), 8. W. Sexton (Garryowen), 9. Michael Bradley, 10. Ralph Keyes (Cork Constitution), 11. D. McCarthy (Young Munster), 12. Mike Kiernan (Dolphin), 13. M. Finn (Cork Constitution), 14. Kenny Murphy (Cork Constitution), 15. Pat Murray (Shannon).

24 October 1987	Leinster	20-19	Connacht	Lansdowne Road, Dublin
	Try: MacNeill; Ward; Haycock; Con: Ward; Pen: Ward; Drop: Mullin	Report	Try: Cosgrave; Clancy; Con: Moran; Pen: Moran (3)

14 November 1987	Connacht	3-20	Ulster	Galway Sportsgrounds
	Pen: Moran	Report	Try: Ringland; McCoy; Russell; Con: Russell; Pen: Rainey	Referee: J. Cole
Connacht: 1. Tom Clancy (Lansdowne), 2. Ciaran Fitzgerald (St Mary's), 3. Davie Henshaw (Athlone), 4. V. Ryan (Lansdowne), 5. Mick Moylett (Shannon), 6. N. McCarthy (St Mary's, c), 7. Mick Fitzgibbon (Dublin University), 8. John O'Driscoll (London Irish), 9. C. McCarthy (Wanderers), 10. Collie Dunne (Blackrock), 11. L. Mulcahy (Terenure), 12. R. Hernan (St Mary's), 13. Michael Cosgrave (Wanderers), 14. Brendan Moran (Waterpark), 15. F. O'Beirne (UCG).				Referee: J. Cole
Ulster: 1. Brian McKibbin (Instonians), John MacDonald (Malone), 3. J. J. McCoy (Bangor), 4. Willie Anderson (Dungannon), 5. J. Rogers (Bangor), 6. Phillip Matthews (Wanderers), 7. Denis McBride (Malone), 8. Davy Morrow (Bangor), 9. Rab Brady (Ballymena), 10. Peter Russell (Instonians), 11. Keith Crossan (Instonians), 12. Bill Harbinson (London Irish), 13. David Irwin (Instonians), 14. Trevor Ringland (Ballymena), 15. Philip Rainey (Ballymena).

14 November 1987	Munster	10-3	Leinster	Thomond Park, Limerick
	Try: Murphy; Pen: Kiernan (2)	Report	Pen: Ward	Referee: B. Stirling

28 November 1987	Leinster	9-22	Ulster	Lansdowne Road, Dublin
	Pen: Ward (2); Drop: Ward	Report	Try: Penalty try Ringland; MacDonald; Con: Russell (2); Pen: Russell (2)
Leinster: 1. Job Langbroek (Blackrock), 2. N. Kearney (Old Wesley), 3. Des Fitzgerald, 4. Kevin Potts (St. Mary's), 5. J. Collins (Dublin University), 6. C. Quinn (Lansdowne), 7. K. Egan (St. Mary's), 8. D. Fanning (St. Mary's), 9. Alain Rolland (Blackrock), 10. Tony Ward (Greystones), 11. P. Purcell (Lansdowne), 12. Vince Cunningham (St. Mary's), 13. Paul Clinch (Lansdowne), 14. Paul Haycock (Terenure), 15. Fergus Dunlea (Lansdowne). Replacements: Willie Dawson (Lansdowne, for Ward), Hugo MacNeill (London Irish, for Clinch).
Ulster: 1. Brian McKibbin (Instonians), John MacDonald (Malone), 3. J. J. McCoy (Bangor), 4. Willie Anderson (Dungannon), 5. Colin Morrison (Malone), 6. Phillip Matthews (Wanderers), 7. Denis McBride (Malone), 8. Davy Morrow (Bangor), 9. Rab Brady (Ballymena), 10. Peter Russell (Instonians), 11. Keith Crossan (Instonians), 12. Bill Harbinson (London Irish), 13. David Irwin (Instonians, c), 14. Trevor Ringland (Ballymena), 15. Philip Rainey (Ballymena).

29 November 1987	Connacht	12-17	Munster	Galway Sportsgrounds
	Try: Fitzgibbon; McCarthy; Con: Moran (2)	Report	Try: Bradley; Galway; Pen: Murray (3)

=== 1988 ===
Team	P	W	D	L	F	A	Pts
Ulster	3	3	0	0	46	29	6
Leinster	3	1	0	2	50	41	2
Munster	3	1	0	2	46	45	2
Connacht	3	1	0	2	24	51	2

22 October 1988	Ulster	16-3	Connacht	Ravenhill, Belfast
	Try: Irwin; Russell; Con: Rainey (2); Pen: Rainey	Report	Pen: Cruess-Callaghan	Referee: Owen Doyle
Ulster: 1. M. Reynolds (Malone), John MacDonald (Malone), 3. J. J. McCoy (Bangor), 4. Willie Anderson (Dungannon), 5. Paddy Johns (Dublin University), 6. Don Whittle (London Irish), 7. Denis McBride (Malone), 8. Phillip Matthews (Wanderers), 9. Rab Brady (Ballymena), 10. Peter Russell (Instonians), 11. Keith Crossan (Instonians), 12. David Irwin (Instonians), 13. John Hewitt (London Irish), 14. Kenny Hooks (Bangor), 15. Philip Rainey (Ballymena).				Referee: Owen Doyle
Connacht: 1. Tom Clancy (Lansdowne), 2. Jamesie O'Riordan (Cork Constitution), 3. Davie Henshaw (Athlone), 4. Mick Moylett (Shannon), 5. Aidan Higgins (London Irish), 6. P. Culhane (Corinthians), 7. Noel Mannion (Corinthians), 8. S. Craven (Terenure), 9. Tommy Conneally (Corinthians), 10. Cedric Cruess-Callaghan (Old Belvedere), 11. Jim Staples (London Irish), 12. J. Daly (Corinthians), 13. Michael Cosgrave (Wanderers), 14. F. O'Flynn (Corinthians), 15. Henry O'Toole (Corinthians). Replacement: C. Dunne (Blackrock, for O'Toole)

22 October 1988	Leinster	23-12	Munster	Lansdowne Road, Dublin
	Try: Sexton; Mullin; Pen: Cunningham (5)	Report	Pen: Kiernan (4)	Referee: S. Hilditch
Leinster: 1. Nick Popplewell (Greystones), 2. N. Kearney (Old Wesley), 3. Des Fitzgerald, 4. Neil Francis (Blackrock), 5. Brian Rigney (Greystones), 6. Chris Pim (Old Wesley), 7. Paddy Kenny (Wanderers), 8. D. Fanning (St Mary's College), 9. Fergus Aherne (Lansdowne), 10. P. Dean (St Mary's College), 11. Paul Haycock (Terenure), 12. Vince Cunningham (St Mary's College), 13. Brendan Mullin (London Irish), 14. John Sexton (Lansdowne), 15. Fergus Dunlea (Lansdowne). Replacement: N. Farren (Old Wesley, for Haycock).				Referee: S. Hilditch
Munster: 1. R. Bevan (Highfield), 2. Terry Kingston (Dolphin), 3. Peter Clohessy (Young Munster), 4. F. Kearney (Sundays Well), 5. Donal Lenihan (Cork Constitution), 6. P. Hogan (Garryowen), 7. Pat O'Hara (Sundays Well), 8. B. Spillane (Bohemians), 9. Michael Bradley (Cork Constitution), 10. Ralph Keyes (Cork Constitution), 11. N. Barry (Garryowen), 12. Mike Kiernan (Dolphin), 13. M. Finn (Cork Constitution), 14. Kenny Murphy (Cork Constitution), 15. Phil Danaher (Garryowen). Replacement: P. Cross (Young Munster, for Finn).

12 November 1988	Ulster	18-17	Leinster	Ravenhill, Belfast
	Try: Crossan; Con: Russell; Pen: Russell (3); Drop: Russell	Report	Try: Sexton (2); Popplewell; Con: Cunningham; Pen: Cunningham
Ulster: 1. M. Reynolds (Malone), John MacDonald (Malone), 3. J. J. McCoy (Bangor), 4. Colin Morrison (Malone), 5. J. Rogers (Bangor), 6. Don Whittle (London Irish), 7. Denis McBride (Malone), 8. Willie Anderson (Dungannon), 9. Rab Brady (Ballymena), 10. Peter Russell (Instonians), 11. Keith Crossan (Instonians), 12. David Irwin (Instonians), 13. John Hewitt (London Irish), 14. Trevor Ringland (Ballymena), 15. Colin Wilkinson (Malone).
Leinster: 1. Nick Popplewell (Greystones), 2. N. Kearney (Old Wesley), 3. Des Fitzgerald, 4. Brian Rigney (Greystones), 5. M. Gibson (London Irish), 6. Chris Pim (Old Wesley), 7. Paddy Kenny (Wanderers), 8. D. Fanning (St Mary's College), 9. Fergus Aherne (Lansdowne), 10. Paul Dean (St Mary's College(, 11. Paul Haycock (Terenure), 12. Vince Cunningham (St Mary's College), 13. Brendan Mullin (London Irish), 14. John Sexton (Lansdowne), 15. Fergus Dunlea (Lansdowne).

12 November 1988	Munster	25-10	Connacht	Musgrave Park, Cork
	Try: Murray; Danaher; Cross; Spillane; Con: Barry; Kiernan (2); Pen: Kiernan	Report	Try: O'Driscoll; Pen: O'Beirne (2)

3 December 1988	Munster	9-12	Ulster	Thomond Park, Limerick
	Pen: Kiernan (3)	Report	Try: Crossan; Matthews; Hooks
Munster: 1. R. Bevan (Highfield), 2. P. Derham (Cork Constitution), 3. Peter Clohessy (Young Munster), 4. Mick Galwey (Shannon), 5. Donal Lenihan (Cork Constitution), 6. Brian Spillane (Bohemians), 7. N. O'Donovan (Shannon), 8. P. O'Hara (Sundays Well), 9. Michael Bradley (Cork Constitution), 10. Ralph Keyes (Cork Constitution), 11. Pat Murray (Shannon), 12. Mike Kiernan (Dolphin), 13. M. Finn (Cork Constitution), 14. Kenny Murphy (Cork Constitution), 15. Phil Danaher (Garryowen). Replacement: M. O'Donoghue (Garryowen, for Galwey).
Ulster: 1. M. Reynolds (Malone), John MacDonald (Malone), 3. J. J. McCoy (Bangor), 4. J. Rogers (Bangor), 5. Paddy Johns (Gosforth), 6. Phillip Matthews (Wanderers), 7. Denis McBride (Malone), 8. Willie Anderson (Dungannon), 9. Rab Brady (Ballymena), 10. Peter Russell (Instonians), 11. Keith Crossan (Instonians), 12. David Irwin (Instonians), 13. John Hewitt (London Irish), 14. Kenny Hooks (Bangor), 15. Philip Rainey (Ballymena).

3 December 1988	Connacht	11-10	Leinster	Galway Sportsgrounds
	Try: O'Riordan; Mannion; Pen: O'Beirne	Report	Try: Aherne; Fanning; Con: Farrenn

=== 1989 ===
Team	P	W	D	L	F	A	Pts
Ulster	3	3	0	0	65	19	6
Munster	3	2	0	1	34	26	4
Leinster	3	2	0	1	25	36	2
Connacht	3	0	0	3	25	68	0

14 October 1989	Connacht	3-38	Ulster	Galway Sportsgrounds
	Pen: O'Beirne	Report	Try: Hewitt (2); Crossan (2); Robinson (2); Hooks; Matthews; Con: Russell (3)
Connacht: 1. Tom Clancy (Lansdowne), 2. J. O'Riordan (Cork Constitution), 3. Davie Henshaw (Athlone), 4. M. Moylett (Shannon), 5. Aidan Higgins (London Irish), 6. S. Guerin (Galwegians), 7. Noel Mannion (Corinthians), 8. Mick Fitzgibbon (Shannon), 9. Sean O'Beirne (St Mary's College), 10. Eric Elwood (Galwegians), 11. Enda Guerin (Galwegians), 12. R Hernan (UCD), 13. Michael Cosgrave (Wanderers), 14. A. Gillen (St Mary's College), 15. Jim Staples (London Irish).
Ulster: 1. M. Reynolds (Malone), John MacDonald (Malone), 3. J. J. McCoy (Bangor), 4. Willie Anderson (Dungannon), 5. Paddy Johns (Dublin University), 6. Phillip Matthews (Wanderers), 7. Denis McBride (Malone), 8. Brian Robinson (Malone), 9. Rab Brady (Ballymena), 10. Peter Russell (Instonians), 11. Keith Crossan (Instonians), 12. David Irwin (Instonians), 13. John Hewitt (London Irish), 14. Kenny Hooks (Bangor), 15. Philip Rainey (Ballymena).

14 October 1989	Munster	10-3	Leinster	Musgrave Park, Cork
		Report

21 October 1989	Leinster	6-14	Ulster	Lansdowne Road, Dublin
	Pen: B. Smith (2)	Report	Try: S. Smith; Crossan; Pen: Russell; Drop: Russell
Leinster: 1. Nick Popplewell (Greystones), 2. N. Kearney (Old Wesley), 3. Des Fitzgerald, 4. Neil Francis (Blackrock), 5. Brian Rigney (Greystones), 6. Paddy Kenny (Wanderers), 7. Chris Pim (Old Wesley), 8. Andy Blair (Old Wesley), 9. Fergus Aherne (Lansdowne, c), 10. Brian Smith (Oxford University), 11. P. Purcell (Lansdowne), 12. Vince Cunningham (St Mary's College), 13. Brendan Mullin (London Irish), 14. Paul Haycock (Terenure), 15. Fergus Dunlea (Lansdowne).
Ulster: 1. M Reynolds (Malone), Steve Smith (Ballymena), 3. J. J. McCoy (Bangor), 4. Willie Anderson (Dungannon), 5. Paddy Johns (Dublin University), 6. Phillip Matthews (Wanderers), 7. Denis McBride (Malone), 8. Brian Robinson (Malone), 9. Rab Brady (Ballymena), 10. Peter Russell (Instonians), 11. Keith Crossan (Instonians), 12. David Irwin (Instonians, c), 13. John Hewitt (London Irish), 14. Kenny Hooks (Bangor), 15. Colin Wilkinson (Malone).

21 October 1989	Connacht	10-14	Munster	Galway Sportsgrounds
		Report

28 October 1989	Ulster	13-10	Munster	Ravenhill, Belfast
	Try: Crossan (2); Con: Russell; Pen: Russell	Report	Try: Lenihan; Kiernan; Con: Kiernan
Ulster: 1. M. Reynolds (Malone), 2. Steve Smith (Ballymena), 3. J. J. McCoy (Bangor), 4. Willie Anderson (Dungannon), 5. Paddy Johns (Dublin University), 6. Phillip Matthews (Wanderers), 7. Denis McBride (Malone), 8. Brian Robinson (Ballymena), 9. Rab Brady (Ballymena), 10. Peter Russell (Instonians), 11. Keith Crossan (Instonians), 12. John Hewitt (London Irish), 13. David Irwin (Instonians), 14. Kenny Hooks (Ards), 15. Philip Rainey (Ballymena).
Munster: 1. John Fitzgerald (Young Munster), 2. Terry Kingston (Dolphin), 3. Peter Clohessy (Young Munster), 4. Donal Lenihan (Cork Constitution), 5. Mick Galwey (Shannon), 6. Ken O'Connell (Sundays Well), 7. Pat O'Hara (Sundays Well), 8. Paul Collins (London Irish, c). 9. O. Kiely (Shannon), 10. Ralph Keyes (Cork Constitution), 11. C. Daly (UCC), 12. Phil Danaher (Garryowen), 13. Mike Kiernan (Dolphin), 14. Jim Galvin (Old Crescent), 15. Kenny Murphy (Cork Constitution). Replacement: Charlie Murphy (Cork Constitution, for Danaher).

28 October 1989	Leinster	16-12	Connacht	Lansdowne Road, Dublin
	Try: Francis; Mullin; Con: Farren; Pen: Farren (2)	Report	Con: O'Beirne (4)
Leinster: 1. Nick Popplewell, 2. Kearney, 3. Des Fitzgerald, 4. Brian Rigney, 5. Neil Francis, 6. Kelvin Leahy, 7. Andy Blair, 8. R. Love, 9. Fergus Aherne, 10. Vince Cunningham, 11. Paul Haycock, 12. Paul Clinch, 13. Brendan Mullin, 14. Niall Farren, 15. Fergus Dunlea.
Connacht: 1. Tom Clancy, 2. O'Riordan, 3. Davie Henshaw, 4. Aidan Higgins, 5. Mark Feely, 6. Noel McCarthy, 7. Noel Mannion, 8. Mick Fitzgibbon, 9. Sean O'Beirne, 10. Cedric Cruess Callaghan, 11. Enda Guerin, 12. Mervyn Feely, 13. Michael Cosgrave, 14. Derek Holland, 15. Jim Staples. Replacement: Aidan Whyte (for Staples).

=== 1990 ===
Team	P	W	D	L	F	A	Pts
Ulster	3	3	0	0	48	30	6
Munster	3	2	0	1	61	49	4
Leinster	3	2	0	1	38	58	2
Connacht	3	0	0	3	45	55	0

1 December 1990	Munster	19-18	Connacht

1 December 1990	Ulster	13-6	Leinster	Ravenhill
	Try: Steve Smith; Pen: Russell; McAleese; Drop: Russell	Report	Pen: Farren (2)	Referee: R. McDowell
Ulster: 1. David Elliott (Bangor), 2. Steve Smith (Ballymena), 3. J. J. McCoy (Bangor), 4. Paddy Johns (Trinity), 5. Davy Tweed (Ballymena) 6. Phillip Matthews (Wanderers), 7. Gordon Hamilton (North), 8. Brian Robinson (Ballymena), 9. Andrew Matchett (Portadown), 10. Peter Russell (Instonians), 11. Terry McMaster (Bangor), 12. David Irwin (Instonians), 13. John Hewitt (London Irish), 14. Kenny Hooks (Bangor), 15. Colin Wilkinson (Malone). Replacements: Willie Anderson (Dungannon, for Tweed), Derek McAleese (Ballymena, for Russell).				Referee: R. McDowell
Leinster: 1. Nick Popplewell (Greystones), 2. P. Kenny (Blackrock), 3. Gary Halpin (Wanderers), 4. Kevin Potts (St. Mary's), 5. Neil Francis (Blackrock), 6. G. Pim (Old Wesley), 7. Kelvin Leahy (c, Wanderers), 8. Philip Lawlor (Bective), 9. Alain Rolland (Blackrock), 10. Brian Smith (Leicester), 11. R. Hennessy (Lansdowne), 12. Paul Clinch (Lansdowne), 13. Vince Cunningham (St. Mary's), 14. Brian Glennon (Lansdowne), 15. Niall Farren (Old Wesley).

8 December 1990	Munster	15-19	Ulster	Musgrave Park, Cork
	Pen: Kiernan (4); Drop: Keyes	Report	Try: Robinson; Matthews; Con: McAleese; Pen: McAleese (3)	Referee: G. Black
Munster: 1. John Fitzgerald (Young Munster), 2. Terry Kingston (Dolphin), 3. Peter Clohessy (Young Munster), 4. Mick Galwey (Shannon), 5. P. O'Grady (Shannon), 6. P. Collins (London Irish), 7. P. Hogan (Garryowen), 8. K. O'Connell (Sundays Well) 9. Michael Bradley (Constitution), 10. Ralph Keyes (Constitution), 11. Jack Clarke (Dolphin), 12. Mike Kiernan (Dolphin), 13. Phil Danaher (Garryowen), 14. Richard Wallace (Garryowen), 15. Kenny Murphy (Constitution). Replacement: Pat Murray (Shannon, for Danaher).				Referee: G. Black
Ulster: 1. Brian McKibbin (Instonians), 2. Steve Smith (Ballymena), 3. J. J. McCoy (Bangor), 4. Paddy Johns (Trinity), 5. Willie Anderson (Dungannon), 6. Phillip Matthews (Wanderers), 7. Gordon Hamilton (North), 8. Brian Robinson (Ballymena), 9. Andrew Matchett (Portadown), 10. Derek McAleese (Ballymena), 11. Terry McMaster (Bangor), 12. David Irwin (Instonians), 13. John Hewitt (London Irish), 14. Kenny Hooks (Bangor), 15. Colin Wilkinson (Malone). Replacement: John Rogers (Bangor, for Johns).

8 December 1990	Connacht	18-20	Leinster

15 December 1990	Leinster	13-27	Munster

15 December 1990	Ulster	16-9	Connacht	Ravenhill
	Try: Matchett; Robinson; Con: McAleese; Pen: McAleese (2)	Report	Try: Geoghegan; Con: Elwood; Pen: White	Referee: B. Smith
Ulster: 1. Brian McKibbin (Instonians), 2. Steve Smith (Ballymena), 3. J. J. McCoy (Bangor), 4. Colin Morrison (Malone), 5. Willie Anderson (Dungannon), 6. Phillip Matthews (Wanderers), 7. Gordon Hamilton (North), 8. Brian Robinson (Ballymena), 9. Andrew Matchett (Portadown), 10. Derek McAleese (Ballymena), 11. Terry McMaster (Bangor), 12. David Irwin (Instonians), 13. John Hewitt (London Irish), 14. Kenny Hooks (Bangor), 15. Colin Wilkinson (Malone). Replacements: Maurice Field (Malone, for Hewitt).				Referee: B. Smith
Connacht: Coach: George Hook. 1. Tom Clancy (Lansdowne), 2. J. O'Riordan (Cork Constitution), 3. C. Shanley (DLSP), 4. Aidan Higgins (London Irish), 5. Steve Jameson (St Marys), 6. N. McCarthy (St. Mary's), 7. M. Fitzgibbon (Shannon) 8. Noel Mannion (Lansdowne), 9. Ken Lawless (Clontarf), 10. Eric Elwood (Galwegians), 11. Simon Geoghegan (London Irish), 12. Derek Holland (Galwegians), 13. Michael Cosgrave (St Marys), 14. Aidan White (St Marys), 15. Jim Staples (London Irish). Replacement: Enda Guerin (Galwegians, for Staples)

=== 1991 ===
Team	P	W	D	L	F	A	Pts
Ulster	3	2	1	0	69	53	5
Munster	3	2	0	1	57	49	4
Leinster	3	1	0	2	48	51	2
Connacht	3	0	1	2	28	49	1

7 December 1991	Leinster	21-22	Ulster	Ravenhill
	Try: Beggy; Ciaran Clarke; Con: Woods (2); Pen: Woods (2); Drop: Ridge	Report	Try: Smyth; Robinson; Con: McAleese; Pen: McAleese (4)
Leinster: 1. N. O'Donoghue (Terenure), 2. J. Murphy (Greystones), 3. D. Dowling (St Mary's), 4. K. Potts (St Mary's), 5. R. Boyd (Greystones), 6. Kelvin Leahy (Wanderers), 7. Philip Lawlor (Bective), 8. K. Devlin (Old Belvedere), 9. Alain Rolland (Blackrock), 10. Paul Hennebry (Terenure), 11. Niall Woods (Blackrock), 12. Martin Ridge (Blackrock), 13. Vince Cunningham (St Mary's), 14. David Beggy (Currie), 15. Ciaran Clarke (Terenure). Replacements: M. Wyse (for Hennebry)
Ulster: 1. David Elliott (Bangor), 2. John MacDonald (c, Malone), 3. Gary Bell (Instonians), 4. Colin Morrison (Malone), 5. Gary Longwell (QUB), 6. Paddy Johns (Dungannon), 7. Gordon Hamilton (c, Ballymena), 8. Robinson, 9. Andrew Matchett (Portadown), 10. Derek McAleese (Ballymena), 11. Davy Smyth (Ballymena), 12. Mark McCall (Bangor), 13. Maurice Field (Malone), 14. Ronnie Carey (Dungannon), 15. Colin Wilkinson (Malone). Replacements: Terry McMaster (for Smyth).

7 December 1991	Connacht	9-15	Munster

14 December 1991	Ulster	37-22	Munster	Ravenhill
	Try: Macartney; Carey (2); Wilkinson; Con: McAleese (3); Pen: McAleese (5)	Report	Try: Wallace (2); Danaher; Con: Keyes (2); Pen: Keyes (2)	Referee: D. Lamont
Ulster: 1. David Elliott (Bangor), 2. John MacDonald (c, Malone), 3. Peter Millar (Ballymena), 4. Colin Morrison (Malone), 5. Gary Longwell (QUB), 6. Dean Macartney (Ballymena), 7. Gordon Hamilton (c, Ballymena), 8. Robinson (Ballymena), 9. Ashley Blair (Dungannon) 10. Derek McAleese (Ballymena), 11. Davy Smyth (Ballymena), 12. Mark McCall (Bangor), 13. Maurice Field (Malone), 14. Ronnie Carey (Dungannon), 15. Colin Wilkinson (Malone).				Referee: D. Lamont
Munster: 1. P. Soden, 2. T. Kingston, 3. P. McCarthy, 4. P. O'Grady, 5. T. Keogh, 6. K. Maher, 7. P. Hogan, 8. M. O'Donaoghue, 9. O. Kiely, 10. Ralph Keyes, 11. B. Walsh, 12. J. Clarke, 13. Phil Danaher, 14. Richard Wallace, 15. D. Larkin.

14 December 1991	Leinster	24-9	Connacht

21 December 1991	Connacht	10-10	Ulster	Galway Sportsgrounds
	Try: Lawless; Pen: White (2)	Report	Try: Carey; Pen: McAleese (2)	Referee: R. McDowell
Connacht: 1. P. McGrath (Galwegians), 2. W. Mulcahy (Skerries), 3. Davey Henshaw (Athlone), 4. Steve Jameson (St Mary's), 5. T. Coughlan (Old Belvedere), 6. S. Moran (Blackrock), 7. Mick Fitzgibbon (Shannon), 8. Noel Mannion (Lansdowne), 9. Kenny Lawless, 10. Eric Elwood (Galwegians), 11. Gordie Curley (Athlone), 12. Michael Cosgrave (c, Wanderers), 13. S. Tormey (Galwegians), 14. Neville Furlong (UCG), 15. Aidan White (St Mary's).				Referee: R. McDowell
Ulster: 1. David Elliott (Bangor), 2. John MacDonald (c, Malone), 3. Peter Millar (Ballymena), 4. Colin Morrison (Malone), 5. Gary Longwell (QUB), 6. Dean Macartney (Ballymena), 7. Denis McBride (c, Ballymena), 8. Robinson (Ballymena), 9. Ashley Blair (Dungannon) 10. Derek McAleese (Ballymena), 11. Davy Smyth (Ballymena), 12. Mark McCall (Bangor), 13. Maurice Field (Malone), 14. Ronnie Carey (Dungannon), 15. Colin Wilkinson (Malone).

21 December 1991	Munster	20-3	Leinster

=== 1992 ===
This season, the IRFU Interprovincial Championship was sponsored by Cara Computers, and for the first time included the Irish Exiles.

Team	P	W	D	L	F	A	Pts	Status
Ulster	4	4	0	0	59	38	8	
(Ireland) Exiles	4	2	0	2	63	57	4	
Leinster	4	2	0	2	54	74	4	
Munster	4	1	0	3	64	62	2	
Connacht	4	1	0	3	56	65	2	

13 September 1992	Exiles (Ireland)	19-13	Munster	Sunbury
	Try: Keenan; Con: Corcoran; Pen: Corcoran (4)	Report	Try: Costelloe; Con: O'Sullivan; Pen: O'Sullivan (2)	Referee: B. Stirling
Exiles: 1. N. Donovan (London Irish), 2. J. McFarland (London Irish), 3. Gary Halpin (London Irish), 4. John Etheridge (Northampton), 5. Mat Keenan (London Irish), 6. D. Cleary (Orrell), 7. Paul Collins (London Irish), 8. Dennis Kelly (Manchester) 9. Rob Saunders (Orrell), 10. B. Wellens (Orrell), 11. Michael Corcoran (London Irish), 12. David Curtis (London Irish), 13. D. Dooley (Saracens), 14. Simon Geoghegan (London Irish), 15. Jim Staples (London Irish). Replacements: D. Lynagh (Paris University, for Wellens, 43').				Referee: B. Stirling
Munster: Coach: Garrett Fitzgerald. 1. John Fitzgerald (Young Munster), 2. Terry Kingston (Dolphin, c), 3. P. McCarthy (Cork Constitution), 4. Mick Galwey (Shannon), 5. Richard Costelloe (Garryowen), 6. Pat O'Hara (Cork Constitution), 7. Barry O'Mahony (UCC), 8. G. Earls (Young Munster). 9. O' Kiely (Shannon), 10. Dan Larkin (Garryowen), 11. Billy O'Shea (Shannon), 12. J. Clarke (Dolphin), 13. Brian Walsh (Cork Constitution), 14. Richard Wallace (Garryowen), 15. Charlie Haley (Cork Constitution). Replacements: George O'Sullivan (Highfield, for Larkin, 16'), Paul Wallace (UCC, for Fitzgerald, 60'), D. O'Mahoney (UCC, for Kiely, 79')

22 September 1992	Leinster	16-14	(Ireland) Exiles	Donnybrook Stadium
	Try: Popplewell; Woods; Pen: Woods (2)	Report	Try: Corcoran; Pen: Corcoran (3)	Referee: S. Hilditch
Leinster: Coach: Jim Glennon. 1. Nick Popplewell (Greystones, c), 2. John Murphy (Greystones), 3. D. Dowling (St Mary's), 4. Brian Rigney (Greystones), 5. Jim O'Callaghan (Wanderers), 6. Kelvin Leahy (Wanderers), 7. Robbie Love (Old Wesley), 8. Philip Lawlor (Bective), 9. Fergus Aherne (Lansdowne) 10. Paul Hennebry (Terenure), 11. Niall Woods, 12. Vince Cunningham (St Mary's), 13. M. Ridge (Blackrock), 14. Damian O'Brien (Clontarf), 15. C. Clarke (Terenure). Replacements: R. Finnegan (Lansdowne, for Leahy, 55'), S. Byrne (Blackrock, for Finnegan, 70').				Referee: S. Hilditch
Exiles: 1. N. Donovan (London Irish), 2. J. McFarland (London Irish), 3. Gary Halpin (London Irish), 4. John Etheridge (Northampton), 5. Mat Keenan (London Irish), 6. D. Cleary (Orrell), 7. Dennis Kelly (Manchester), 8. K. Hickey (Coventry), 9. Rob Saunders (Orrell), 10. D. Lynagh (Paris University), 11. Michael Corcoran (London Irish), 12. David Curtis (London Irish), 13. D. Dooley (Saracens), 14. Simon Geoghegan (London Irish), 15. Jim Staples (London Irish, c).

28 November 1992	Munster	11-12	Ulster
	Try: Cronin; Pen: Haly (2)	Report	Pen: Russell; Humphreys (2); Drop: Humphreys	Referee: O. Doyle
Munster: Coach: Garrett Fitzgerald. 1. P. McCarthy (Cork Constitution), 2. Paddy Kenny (Shannon), 3. Peter Clohessy, (Young Munster), 4. Mick Galwey (Shannon), 5. Richard Costelloe (Garryowen), 6. G. Clohessy (Young Munster), 7. Eddie Halvey (Shannon), 8. Ben Cronin (Garryowen), 9. D. Tobin (Young Munster), 10. Jim Galvin (Shannon), 11. P. Murray (Shannon), 12. Philip Danaher (Garryowen), 13. Brian Walsh (Cork Constitution), 14. Richard Wallace (Garryowen), 15. Charlie Haley (Cork Constitution). Replacements: L. Dineen (Cork Constitution, for Cronin.				Referee: O. Doyle
Ulster: Coach: Davy McMaster. 1. Davy Elliott (Bangor), 2. Steve Smith (Ballymena), 3. Gary Bell (Instonians), 4. Gary Longwell (QUB), 5. Davy Tweed (Ballymena), 6. Stephen McKinty (Bangor) 7. Denis McBride (Malone, c), 8. Brian Robinson (Ballymena), 9. Andrew Matchett (Ballymena), 10. Peter Russell (Instonians) 11. Tyrone Howe (Dungannon), 12. Bill Harbinson (Malone), 13. Maurice Field (Malone), 14. Ronnie Carey (Dungannon), 15. Colin Wilkinson (Malone). Replacements: Andy Adair (for Smith), David Humphreys (QUB, for Russell).

28 November 1992	Connacht	28-9	Leinster	Galway Sportsgrounds
	Try: Mulcahy (2); Curley; Con: White (2); Pen: White (3)	Report	Pen: McGowan (3)	Referee: R. McDowell
Connacht: 1. Tom Clancy (Lansdowne), 2. Billy Mulcahy (Skerries), 3. D. Henshaw (Athlone), 4. T. Coughlin (St Mary's), 5. Steve Jameson (St Mary's), 6. S. Moran (Blackrock), 7. K. Devlin (St Mary's), 8. Noel Mannion (Lansdowne), 9. Ken Lawless (Clontarf), 10. Eric Elwood (Lansdowne), 11. Gordon Curley (Athlone), 12. Stephen Carty (Galwegians), 13. Michael Cosgrave (Wanderers, c), 14. C. Leahy (Wanderers), 15. Aidan White (St Mary's).				Referee: R. McDowell
Leinster: Coach: Jim Glennon. 1. H. Hurley (Old Wesley), 2. John Murphy (Greystones), 3. D. Dowling (St Mary's), 4. M. O'Neill (Blackrock), 5. Jim O'Callaghan (Wanderers), 6. Kelvin Leahy (Wanderers), 7. Robbie Love (Old Wesley), 8. Philip Lawlor (Bective), 9. Fergus Aherne (Lansdowne) 10. Alan McGowan, 11. Niall Woods, 12. Vince Cunningham (St Mary's), 13. M. Ridge (Blackrock), 14. J. Sexton (Lansdowne), 15. Conor O'Shea (Lansdowne). Replacements: Michael Corcoran (St Mary's, for Murphy, 7'), Paul Hennberry (Terenure, for McGowan, 64')

6 December 1992	Leinster	21-20	Munster	Donnybrook Stadium
	Try: Pim; Cunningham; Con: Woods; Pen: C. O'Shea (2); Woods	Report	Try: Galvin; Walsh; Con: B. O'Shea (2); Drop: Galvin; Larkin	Referee: Alan Watson
Leinster: Coach: Jim Glennon. 1. Nick Popplewell (Greystones, c), 2. John Murphy (Greystones), 3. D. Dowling (St Mary's), 4. David Dorsey (Old Wesley), 5. Jim O'Callaghan (Wanderers), 6. Chris Pim (Old Wesley), 7. Robbie Love (Old Wesley), 8. Philip Lawlor (Bective), 9. Alain Rolland (Blackrock), 10. Paul Hennebry (Terenure), 11. Niall Woods, 12. Vince Cunningham (St Mary's), 13. Colin Younger (Terenure), 14. J. Sexton (Lansdowne), 15. Conor O'Shea (Lansdowne). Replacements: A. McKeen (for Dowling, 52'), Fergus Aherne (for Rolland, 74').				Referee: Alan Watson
Munster: Coach: Garrett Fitzgerald. 1. P. McCarthy (Cork Constitution), 2. Paddy Kenny (Shannon), 3. Peter Clohessy, (Young Munster), 4. Eoin O'Sullivan (Old Crescent), 5. Richard Costelloe (Garryowen), 6. L. Dineen (Cork Constitution), 7. Eddie Halvey (Shannon), 8. Mick Galwey (Shannon), 9. Michael Bradley, 10. Jim Galvin (Shannon), 11. Richard Wallace (Garryowen), 12. Philip Danaher (Garryowen), 13. Brian Walsh (Cork Constitution), 14. Billy O'Shea (Shannon), 15. Pat Murray (Shannon, c). Replacements: Dan Larkin (Garryowen, for Galvin, 53').

6 December 1992	Ulster	19-6	Connacht	Ravenhill
	Try: Field; Tweed; Howe; Con: Russell (2)	Report	Pen: White (2)	Referee: B. Smith
Ulster: Coach:Davy McMaster. 1. Davy Elliott (Bangor), 2. John MacDonald, 3. Gary Bell (Instonians), 4. Davy Tweed (Ballymena), 5. Paddy Johns, 6. Stephen McKinty (Bangor) 7. Denis McBride (Malone, c), 8. Brian Robinson (Ballymena), 9. Andrew Matchett (Ballymena), 10. Peter Russell (Instonians) 11. Tyrone Howe (Dungannon), 12. Bill Harbinson (Malone), 13. Maurice Field (Malone), 14. Ronnie Carey (Dungannon), 15. Colin Wilkinson (Malone).				Referee: B. Smith
Connacht: 1. Tom Clancy (Lansdowne), 2. Billy Mulcahy (Skerries), 3. D. Henshaw (Athlone), 4. Tim Coughlin (St Mary's), 5. Steve Jameson (St Mary's), 6. S. Moran (Blackrock), 7. K. Devlin (St Mary's), 8. Noel Mannion (Lansdowne), 9. Ken Lawless (Clontarf), 10. Eric Elwood (Lansdowne), 11. Gordon Curley (Athlone), 12. Stephen Carty (Galwegians), 13. Michael Cosgrave (Wanderers, c), 14. C. Leahy (Wanderers), 15. Aidan White (St Mary's).

11 December 1992	Munster	20-10	Connacht

11 December 1992	Exiles (Ireland)	13-16	Ulster
	Try: Verling; Con: Corcoran; Pen: Corcoran (2)	Report	Try: Harbinson; Con: Russell; Pen: Russell (2); Drop: Russell
Exiles: 1. N. Donovan (London Irish), 2. John McFarland (London Irish), 3. Gary Halpin (London Irish), 4. John Etheridge (Northampton), 5. Mat Keenan (London Irish), 6. D. Cleary (Orrell), 7. Aaron Verling (London Irish), 8. Dennis Kelly (Manchester), 9. Rob Saunders (Orrell), 10. B. Wellens (Orrell), 11. Michael Corcoran (London Irish), 12. David Curtis (London Irish), 13. D. Dooley (Saracens), 14. Simon Geoghegan (London Irish), 15. Jim Staples (London Irish).
Ulster: Coach: Davy McMaster. 1. Davy Elliott (Bangor), 2. Steve Smith (Ballymena), 3. Gary Bell (Instonians), 4. Paddy Johns (Dungannon), 5. Davy Tweed (Ballymena), 6. Stephen McKinty (Bangor) 7. Denis McBride (Malone, c), 8. Brian Robinson (Ballymena), 9. Andrew Matchett (Ballymena), 10. Peter Russell (Instonians) 11. Tyrone Howe (Dungannon), 12. Bill Harbinson (Malone), 13. Maurice Field (Malone), 14. Ronnie Carey (Dungannon), 15. Colin Wilkinson (Malone). Replacements: Gary Longwell (QUB, for Robinson)

19 December 1992	Ulster	12-8	Leinster	Ravenhill
	Pen: Russell (3); Drop: Russell	Report	Try: O'Shea; Pen: O'Shea	Attendance: 5,000; Referee: D. McHugh
Ulster: Coach: Davy McMaster. 1. Davy Elliott (Bangor), 2. Steve Smith (Ballymena), 3. Gary Bell (Instonians), 4. Davy Tweed (Ballymena), 5. Paddy Johns (Dungannon), 6. Colin Darrah (NIFC), 7. Denis McBride (c, Malone), 8. Stephen McKinty (Bangor), 9. Andrew Matchett (Ballymena), 10. Peter Russell (Instonians), 11. Tyrone Howe (Dungannon), 12. Bill Harbinson (Malone), 13. Maurice Field (Malone), 14. Ronnie Carey (Dungannon), 15. Colin Wilkinson (Malone). Replacements: Brian McKibbin (for Elliott).				Attendance: 5,000; Referee: D. McHugh
Leinster: Coach: Jim Glennon. 1. H. Hurley (Old Wesley), 2. John Murphy (Greystones), 3. A. McKeen (Lansdowne), 4. Jim O'Callaghan (Wanderers), 5. David Bursey (Old Wesley), 6. Chris Pim (Old Wesley), 7. Robbie Love (Old Wesley), 8. Philip Lawlor (Bective), 9. Alain Rolland (Blackrock), 10. Paul Hennebry (Terenure), 11. Niall Woods (Blackrock), 12. Colin Younger (Terenure), 13. Vince Cunningham (St Marys), 14. Brian Glennon (Lansdowne), 15. Conor O'Shea (Lansdowne). Replacements: Malcolm Mahon (for Love)

19 December 1992	Connacht	12-17	(Ireland) Exiles

=== 1993 ===
Team	P	W	D	L	F	A	Pts	Status
Leinster	4	3	0	1	72	40	6	
Ulster	4	3	0	1	84	59	6	
Munster	4	3	0	1	91	71	6	
(Ireland) Exiles	4	1	0	3	71	80	2	
Connacht	4	0	0	4	42	110	0	

17 October 1993	Ulster	21-3	(Ireland) Exiles	Ravenhill
	Try: Tweed; Millar; Con: Humphreys; Pen: Humphreys (3)	Report	Pen: Burke	Referee: B. Smith
Ulster: 1. Davy Millar (Dungannon), 2. John MacDonald (Malone), 3. Gary Bell (Instonians), 4. Paddy Johns (Dungannon), 5. Davy Tweed (Ballymena), 6. Stephen McKinty (Bangor), 7. Denis McBride (Malone, c), 8. Brian Robinson (Ballymena), 9. Ashley Blair (Dungannon), 10. David Humphreys (QUB), 11. Tyrone Howe (Dungannon), 12. Mark McCall (Bangor), 13. Maurice Field (Malone), 14. Innes Gray (QUB), 15. Ian Orr (City of Derry). Replacements: Stephen Smyth (City of Derry, for Orr).				Referee: B. Smith
Exiles: 1. N. Donovan (London Irish), 2. M. Kernohan (Glasgow High/Kelvinside), 3. Gary Halpin (London Irish), 4. John Etheridge (Blackrock), 5. Mat Keenan (London Irish), 6. D. Cleary (Orrell), 7. A. Verling (London Irish), 8. Denis Kelly (Manchester), 9. Rob Saunders (London Irish), 10. Paul Burke (London Irish), 11. P. Hopley (Wasps), 12. K. Orrell (Treorchy), 13. D. Dooley (Saracens), 14. Simon Geoghegan (London Irish), 15. Jim Staples (Harlequins, c). Replacements: M. Dobson (Sale, for Kelly), Ray Hennessy (London Irish, for Staples), K. Rabitte (West Park, for Kernohan).

17 October 1993	Connacht	9-15	Munster

23 October 1993	Connacht	10-39	Ulster	Galway Sportsgrounds
	Try: Curley; Con: Elwood; Pen: Elwood	Report	Try: Blair; Wilkinson; Humphreys; McKinty; McBride; Con: McCall (4); Pen: McCall (2)	Referee: A. Lewis
Connacht: 1. T. Clancy (DLSP), 2. James O'Riordan, 3. Ciaran Shanley (DLSP), 4. T. Coughlan (St. Mary's), 5. S. James (St. Mary's), 6. Victor Costello (St. Mary's), 7. Kevin Devlin (St. Mary's), 8. Noel Mannion (Lansdowne), 9. Brian Comerford, 10. Eric Elwood (Lansdowne), 11. Gordon Curley, 12. S. Carty, 13. M. Cosgrave (Wanderers), 14. Colin Leahy, 15. Aidan White (St. Mary's). Replacement: Ronan Garvey (for White)				Referee: A. Lewis
Ulster: 1. Davy Millar (Dungannon), 2. John MacDonald (Malone), 3. Gary Bell (Instonians), 4. Paddy Johns (Dungannon), 5. Davy Tweed (Ballymena), 6. Stephen McKinty (Bangor), 7. Denis McBride (Malone, c), 8. Brian Robinson (Ballymena), 9. Ashley Blair, 10. David Humphreys (QUB), 11. Tyrone Howe (Dungannon), 12. Mark McCall (Bangor), 13. Maurice Field (Malone), 14. Innes Gray (QUB), 15. Colin Wilkinson (Malone).

23 October 1993	Exiles (Ireland)	8-13	Leinster

30 October 1993	Munster	21-19	Leinster

30 October 1993	Exiles (Ireland)	42-12	Connacht

12 November 1993	Leinster	25-0	Ulster	Donnybrook
	Try: Woods; O'Shea; Gavin; Con: O'Shea (2); Pen: O'Shea (2)	Report		Referee: S. Lander
Leinster: 1. H. Hurley (Old Wesley), 2. Shane Byrne (Blackrock), 3. Angus McKeen (Lansdowne), 4. Brian Rigney (Greystones), 5. Neil Francis (Old Belvedere), 6. Chris Pim (Old Wesley), 7. Robert Love (Old Wesley), 8. Philip Lawlor (Bective), 9. Niall Hogan (Terenure, c), 10. Alan McGowan (Blackrock), 11. Niall Woods (Blackrock), 12. Martin Ridge (Blackrock), 13. Vince Cunningham (St. Mary's), 14. Paddy Gavin (Old Belevedere), 15. Conor O'Shea (Lansdowne).				Referee: S. Lander
Ulster: 1. Davy Millar (Dungannon), 2. John MacDonald (Malone), 3. Gary Bell (Instonians), 4. Paddy Johns (Dungannon), 5. Davy Tweed (Ballymena), 6. Stephen McKinty (Bangor), 7. Denis McBride (Malone, c), 8. Brian Robinson (Ballymena), 9. Ashley Blair, 10. David Humphreys (QUB), 11. Tyrone Howe (Dungannon), 12. Mark McCall (Bangor), 13. Maurice Field (Malone), 14. Innes Gray (QUB), 15. Colin Wilkinson (Malone). Replacements: Gary Longwell (QUB, for Tweed, 40)

26 November 1993	Munster	34-19	(Ireland) Exiles

18 December 1993	Ulster	24-21	Munster	Ravenhill
	Try: Wilkinson; Howe; Con: McCall; Pen: McCall (3); Drop: Humphreys	Report	Pen: O'Sullivan (7)	Referee: G. Black
Ulster: 1. David Elliott (Bangor), 2. John MacDonald (Malone), 3. Peter Millar (Ballymena), 4. Paddy Johns (Dungannon), 5. Davy Tweed (Ballymena), 6. Stephen McKinty (Bangor), 7. Denis McBride (Malone, c), 8. Brian Robinson (Ballymena), 9. Andrew Matchett (Ballymena), 10. David Humphreys (QUB), 11. Tyrone Howe (Dungannon), 12. Mark McCall (Bangor), 13. Maurice Field (Malone), 14. Ronnie Carey (Dungannon), 15. Colin Wilkinson (Malone). Replacements: Jeremy Hastings (Dungannon, for McBride, 31).				Referee: G. Black
Munster: 1. P. Soden (Cork Constitution), 2. Terry Kingston (Dolphin, c), 3. Paul Wallace (Blackrock), 4. Gabriel Fulcher (Cork Constitution), 5. Mick Galwey (Shannon), 6. Ken O'Connell (Sunday's Well), 7. Eddie Halvey (, Shannon) 8. Len Dineen (Cork Constitution), 9. Michael Bradley (Cork Constitution), 10. George O'Sullivan (Cork Constitution), 11. Kenny Murphy (Cork Constitution), 12. Brian Walsh (Cork Constitution), 13. Phil Danaher (Garryowen), 14. Richard Wallace (Garryowen), 15. Pat Murray (Shannon).

18 December 1993	Leinster	15-11	Connacht	Donnybrook
	Pen: McGowan (5)	Report	Try: Leahy; Pen: White (2)	Referee: R. McDowell
Leinster: 1. H. Hurley (Old Wesley), 2. Shane Byrne (Blackrock), 3. Angus McKeen (Lansdowne), 4. Brian Rigney (Greystones), 5. Neil Francis (Old Belvedere), 6. K. Potts (St. Mary's), 7. R. Love (Old Wesley), 8. Philip Lawlor (Bective), 9. Niall Hogan (Terenure, c), 10. Alan McGowan (Blackrock), 11. Niall Woods (Blackrock), 12. Martin Ridge (Blackrock), 13. Vince Cunningham (St. Mary's), 14. Paddy Gavin (Old Belevedere), 15. Conor O'Shea (Lansdowne). Replacements: B. Keane (St. Mary's, for McKeen, 37)				Referee: R. McDowell
Connacht: 1. T. Clancy (DLSP), 2. B. Mulcahy (Skerries), 3. C. Shanley (DLSP), 4. T. Coughlan (St. Mary's), 5. S. James (St. Mary's), 6. Victor Costello (St. Mary's), 7. Noel Mannion (Lansdowne), 8. K. Devlin (St. Mary's), 9. Diarmuid Reddan (Old Crescent), 10. Eric Elwood (Lansdowne), 11. Colin Leahy (Wanderers), 12. S. Tormey (Old Belvedere), 13. M. Cosgrave (Wanderers), 14. Neville Furlong (Garryowen), 15. Aidan White (St. Mary's).

=== 1994 ===
Team	P	W	D	L	F	A	Pts	Status
Munster	4	4	0	0	159	58	8	Champions; qualified for 1995–96 Heineken Cup
Ulster	4	2	0	2	84	51	4	Qualified for 1995–96 Heineken Cup
Leinster	4	2	0	2	65	80	4	Qualified for 1995–96 Heineken Cup
(Ireland) Exiles	4	1	0	3	77	117	2	
Connacht	4	1	0	3	55	134	2	

Munster beat Ulster in an Interpro for the first time since 1980.

12 November 1994	Munster	17-16	Ulster	Musgrave Park
	Try: Smith; Pen: Smith (3); Drop: Burke	Report	Try: Matchett; Con: McCall; Pen: McCall; Humphreys; Drop: Humphreys	Referee: Alan Lewis
Munster: 1. John Fitzgerald, 2. Keith Wood, 3. Peter Clohessy, 4. Mick Galwey, 5. Gabriel Fulcher, 6. Eddie Halvey, 7. Anthony Foley, 8. David Corkery, 9. David O'Mahony, 10. Paul Burke, 11. Brian Roche, 12. Phil Danaher, 13. Sean McCahill, 14. Kenny Smith, 15. Pat Murray (c)				Referee: Alan Lewis
Ulster: 1. Gary Bell, 2. John MacDonald (c), 3. Simon Booth, 4. Gary Longwell, 5. Davy Tweed, 6. David Erskine, 7. Denis McBride, 8. Stephen McKinty, 9. Andrew Matchett, 10. David Humphreys, 11. Davy Smyth, 12. Maurice Field, 13. Mark McCall, 14. Ronnie Carey, 15. Jonnny Bell.

12 November 1994	Connacht	9-35	(Ireland) Exiles	Galway Sportsgrounds
	Pen: Carolan (2); Drop: Carolan	Report	Try: Staples (2); Corcoran (2); Geoghegan; Boyle; Con: Staples; Pen: Corcoran
Connacht: 1. Tom Clancy, 2. Billy Mulcahy, 3. Paul Flavin, 4. John Etheridge, 5. Steve Jameson, 6. Victor Costello, 7. K. Devlin (c), 8. Noel Mannion, 9. Diarmuid Reddan, 10. Hugh Carolan, 11. Gordon Curley, 12. Steve Tormey, 13. G. Lavin, 14. Colin Leahy, 15. Aidan White. Replacements: M. Murphy (for Leahy, 40').
Exiles: Coach: John O'Driscoll. 1. N. Donovan, 2. David Addleton, 3. Gary Halpin, 4. K. Gallagher, 5. A. Verling, 6. Darryl O'Grady, 7. M. Dobson, 8. Dean Macartney, 9. Guy Easterby, 10. Niall Malone, 11. Simon Geoghegan, 12. Laurence Boyle, 13. Dan Dooley, 14. Michael Corcoran, 15. Jim Staples (c). Replacements: Brian Wellens (for Malone, 75'), A. Higgins (for O'Grady, 80').

19 November 1994	Ulster	20–6	Connacht	Ravenhill
	Try: Tweed (2); Con: McCall (2); Pen: McCall; Drop: Humphreys	Report	Pen: Carolan; Drop: White
Ulster: 1. Simon Booth, 2. John MacDonald (c), 3. Gary Bell 4. Davy Tweed, 5. Gary Longwell, 6. David Erskine, 7. Denis McBride, 8. Stephen McKinty, 9. Andrew Matchett, 10. David Humphreys, 11. Graeme McCluskey, 12. Maurice Field, 13. Mark McCall, 14. Ronnie Carey, 15. Jonny Bell. Replacements: Andy Adair (for McDonald, 72), Jeremy Hastings (for Erskine, 73).
Connacht: 1. Tom Clancy, 2. Billy Mulcahy, 3. Paul Flavin, 4. John Etheridge, 5. Steve Jameson, 6. Victor Costello, 7. K. Devlin (c), 8. Noel Mannion, 9. Diarmuid Reddan, 10. Aidan White, 11. Myles O'Reilly, 12. Michael Cosgrave, 13. Steve Tormey, 14. Michael Devine, 15. Hugh Carolan). Replacements: Barry Gavin (for Costello, 33).

20 November 1994	Leinster	20-18	(Ireland) Exiles	Donnybrook
	Try: Rolland; Francis; Con: McGowan (2); Pen: McGowan; Drop: Moloney	Report	Try: Staples; Halpin; Con: Corcoran; Pen: Corcoran (2)
Leinster: 1. Henry Hurley, 2. Shane Byrne, 3. B. Keane, 4. B. Cusack, 5. Neil Francis, 6. Chris Pim, 7. K. Potts, 8. Robbie Love, 9. Alain Rolland (c), 10. Alan McGowan, 11. D. Wall, 12. Rory Moloney, 13. B. Glennon, 14. Paddy Gavin, 15. Ciaran Clarke. Replacement: Michael Kearney (for Clarke, 46)
Exiles: 1. N. Donovan, 2. David Addleton, 3. Gary Halpin, 4. K. Gallagher, 5. A. Verling, 6. J. Green, 7. M. Dobson, 8. Darryl O'Grady, 9. Guy Easterby, 10. Niall Malone, 11. Simon Geoghegan, 12. Laurence Boyle, 13. Dan Dooley, 14. Michael Corcoran, 15. Jim Staples (c).

26 November 1994	Connacht	20-19	Leinster	Galway Sportsgrounds
	Try: Etheridge; Mannion; Con: Carolan (2); Pen: Carolan (2)	Report	Try: Carney; Con: Campion; Pen: McGowan (2); Campion (2)
Connacht: Coach: George Hook. 1. Tom Clancy, 2. Billy Mulcahy, 3. Paul Flavin, 4. John Etheridge, 5. Steve Jameson, 6. Barry Gavin, 7. K. Devlin (c), 8. Noel Mannion, 9. Diarmuid Reddan, 10. Aidan White, 11. Myles O'Reilly, 12. Michael Cosgrave, 13. M. Murphy, 14. Michael Devine, 15. Hugh Carolan, Replacements: Tim Coughlin (for Devlin, 33'), D. Henshaw (for Flavin, 40')
Leinster: 1. Henry Hurley, 2. Shane Byrne, 3. J. Feehan, 4. Brian Rigney, 5. Neil Francis, 6. Chris Pim, 7. Robbie Love, 8. Philip Lawlor, 9. Alain Rolland (c), 10. Alan McGowan, 11. D. Finnegan, 12. Rory Moloney, 13. B. Glennon, 14. Paddy Gavin, 15. Michael Kearney. Replacements: F. Campion (for McGowan, 25').

26 November 1994	Exiles (Ireland)	8-46	Munster	The Avenue
	Try: Henderson; Pen: Malone	Report	Try: Burke; Foley; Halvey; Smith; Con: Smith (4); Pen: Smith (6)
Exiles: 1. N. Donovan, 2. T. Garnett, 3. Gary Halpin, 4. S. Smith, 5. A. Verling, 6. J. Green, 7. Darryl O'Grady, 8. M. Dobson, 9. Guy Easterby, 10. Niall Malone. 11. Simon Geoghegan, 12. Laurence Boyle, 13. Rob Henderson, 14. P. Hopley, 15. Jim Staples (c).
Munster: 1. John Fitzgerald, 2. Keith Wood, 3. Peter Clohessy, 4. Mick Galwey, 5. Gabriel Fulcher, 6. Eddie Halvey, 7. Anthony Foley, 8. David Corkery, 9. David O'Mahony, 10. Paul Burke, 11. Kenny Smith, 12. Phil Danaher, 13. Sean McCahill, 14. Billy O'Shea, 15. Pat Murray (c). Replacements: Richard Costelloe (for Fulcher, 67'), Dan Larkin (for Murray, 72')

10 December 1994	Exiles (Ireland)	16-42	Ulster	Heywood Road
	Try: Smith; Con: Malone; Pen: Malone (3)	Report	Try: J. Bell (2); Howe (2); Wilson; Con: McCall; Pen: McCall (4); Humphreys	Referee: B. Smith
Exiles: 1. N. Donovan, 2. David Addleton, 3. Gary Halpin, 4. S. Smith, 5. A. Verling, 6. Dean Macartney, 7. Darren Adams, 8. Darryl O'Grady, 9. Guy Easterby, 10. Niall Malone, 11. J. Reynolds, 12. Laurence Boyle, 13. Brian Wellens, 14. D. Casado, 15. Jim Staples). Replacements: O. Cobbe (for Reynolds)				Referee: B. Smith
Ulster: 1. Simon Booth, 2. John MacDonald (c), 3. Gary Bell, 4. Gary Longwell, 5. Davy Tweed, 6. Stephen McKinty, 7. Denis McBride, 8. Roger Wilson, 9. Andrew Matchett, 10. David Humphreys, 11. Tyrone Howe, 12. Maurice Field, 13. Mark McCall, 14. Innes Gray, 15. Jonny Bell.

10 December 1994	Leinster	14-36	Munster	Donnybrook
	Try: Rigney; Pen: McGowan (3)	Report	Try: O'Shea; Corkery; O'Mahony; Danaher; Foley; Con: Smith (4); Pen: Smith
Leinster: 1. B. Keane, 2. Shane Byrne, 3. Angus McKeen, 4. Brian Rigney, 5. Neil Francis, 6. Chris Pim, 7. S. Rooney, 8. Philip Lawlor, 9. Niall Hogan (c), 10. Alan McGowan, 11. Niall Woods, 12. M. Ridge, 13. Rory Moloney, 14. Paddy Gavin, 15. Conor O'Shea. Replacements: K. Potts (for Lawlor 40).
Munster: 1. John Fitzgerald, 2. Terry Kingston, 3. Peter Clohessy, 4. Mick Galwey, 5. Richard Costelloe, 6. Eddie Halvey, 7. Anthony Foley, 8. David Corkery, 9. David O'Mahony, 10. Paul Burke, 11. Kenny Smith, 12. Phil Danaher, 13. Sean McCahill, 14. Billy O'Shea, 15. Pat Murray (c).

17 December 1994	Ulster	6-12	Leinster	Ravenhill
	Pen: Humphreys; McCall	Report	Pen: McGowan (4)	Referee: T. Spreadbury
Ulster: 1. Gary Bell, 2. John MacDonald (c), 3. Simon Booth, 4. Jeremy Davidson, 5. Davy Tweed, 6. Stephen McKinty, 7. Denis McBride, 8. Roger Wilson, 9. Andrew Matchett, 10. David Humphreys, 11. Tyrone Howe, 12. Maurice Field, 13. Mark McCall, 14. Innes Gray, 15. Jonny Bell. Replacements: Gary Longwell (for Davidson 63), Stan McDowell (for J. Bell, 75).				Referee: T. Spreadbury
Leinster: 1. B. Keane, 2. Shane Byrne, 3. Angus McKeen, 4. Brian Rigney, 5. Neil Francis, 6. Chris Pim, 7. S. Rooney, 8. Philip Lawlor, 9. Niall Hogan (c), 10. Alan McGowan, 11. Niall Woods, 12. M. Ridge, 13. Rory Moloney, 14. Paddy Gavin, 15. Conor O'Shea. Replacements: K. Potts (for Lawlor 40).

17 December 1994	Munster	60-20	Connacht	Thomond Park
	Try: Murray; O'Shea; Penalty try Foley (3); Corkery; Danaher; Burke; Con: Smith (3); Pen: Smith (2); Drop: Smith	Report	Try: Devine (3); Con: Carolan; Pen: Carolan
Connacht: 1. Tom Clancy, 2. Billy Mulcahy, 3. Paul Flavin, 4. John Etheridge, 5. Steve Jameson, 6. Barry Gavin, 7. R. Rogers, 8. Noel Mannion, 9. Diarmuid Reddan, 10. Eric Elwood, 11. Myles O'Reilly, 12. Michael Cosgrave, 13. Steve Tormey, 14. Michael Devine, 15. Hugh Carolan. Replacements: Barry Gavin (for Costello, 33).

=== 1995 ===
The 1995 IRFU Interprovincial Championship was the first to be held since rugby union was declared open to professionalism. At this stage the Irish provinces were still representative teams, not professional clubs. Many involved in the game were concerned that domestic clubs could not afford to pay players, who could be lost to professional teams in England. In September, the IRFU confirmed that, for this season, only senior international players would be paid, with a one-year moratorium on payment for club and provincial players. As the situation developed, match fees became available for Heineken Cup and Interprovincial matches. Leinster won the Interprovincial title for the first time in twelve years.

Team	P	W	D	L	F	A	Pts	Status
Leinster	4	4	0	0	133	53	8	Champions; qualified for 1996–97 Heineken Cup
Ulster	4	3	0	1	73	53	6	Qualified for 1996–97 Heineken Cup
Munster	4	2	0	2	91	58	4	Qualified for 1996–97 Heineken Cup
(Ireland) Exiles	4	1	0	3	71	113	2	
Connacht	4	0	0	4	51	142	0	Qualified for 1996–97 European Challenge Cup

25 November 1995	Ulster	14–10	Munster	Ravenhill
	Try: Mackey; Pen: McCall (3)	Report	Try: Walsh; Con: Smith; Pen: Smith	Referee: A. Lewis
Ulster: 1. Richard Mackey (Malone), 2. Allen Clarke (Northampton), 3. Gary Leslie (Dungannon), 4. Jeremy Davidson (Dungannon), 5. Davy Tweed (Ballymena), 6. Stuart Duncan (Malone), 7. Denis McBride (Malone), 8. Paddy Johns (Dungannon), 9. Neil Doak (NIFC), 10. Mark McCall (Bangor), 11. Jan Cunningham (TCD), 12. Bill Harbinson (c) (Malone), 13. Maurice Field (Malone), 14. James Topping (Ballymena), 15. Jonny Bell (Northampton).				Referee: A. Lewis
Munster: 1. John Fitzgerald (Young Munster), 2. Paul Cunningham (Garryowen), 3. Peter Clohessy (Young Munster), 4. Gabriel Fulcher (Cork Constitution), 5. Paul O'Connor (Lansdowne), 6. Mick Galwey (Shannon), 7. Anthony Foley (Shannon), 8. David Corkery (Terenure), 9. David O'Mahony (Cork Constitution), 10. Paul Burke (Cork Constitution), 11. Kenny Smith (Garryowen), 12. Sean McCahill (Sunday's Well), 13. Brian Walsh (Cork Constitution), 14. Richard Wallace (Garryowen), 15. Pat Murray (c) (Shannon).

25 November 1995	Irish Exiles (Ireland)	28–22	Connacht	The Avenue
	Try: Henderson; Staples (2); Halpin; Con: Corcoran; Pen: Corcoran (2)	Report	Try: Mannion; Con: Elwood; Pen: Elwood (4)	Referee: L. Mayne
Irish Exiles: 1. N. Donovan (Clontarf), 2. David Addleton (Coventry), 3. Gary Halpin (London Irish), 4. John Etheridge (Northampton), 5. S. Smith (Rugby), 6. John Green (Saracens), 7. Darryl O'Grady (Sale), 8. Darren Adams (Racing Club), 9. Chris Saverimutto (Sale), 10. Niall Malone (Leicester), 11. Simon Geoghegan (Bath), 12. Paul Flood (London Irish), 13. Rob Henderson (London Irish), 14. Michael Corcoran (London Irish), 15. Jim Staples (c) (Harlequins).				Referee: L. Mayne
Connacht: 1. Dave Kavanagh (Blackrock), 2. Billy Mulcahy (Skerries), 3. Ciaran Shanley (DLSP), 4. Graham Heaslip (Galwegians), 5. J. O'Callaghan (Wanderers), 6. Rory Rogers (Blackrock), 7. Kevin Devlin (c) (St. Mary's), 8. Noel Mannion (Buccaneers), 9. Diarmuid Reddan (Old Crescent), 10. Eric Elwood (Lansdowne), 11. Marcus O'Reilly (Old Belvedere), 12. Brian Carey (UCD), 13. R. Corrigan (Lansdowne), 14. Michael Devine (Buccaneers), 15. Aidan White (Corinthians).

2 December 1995	Connacht	9–27	Ulster	Galway Sportsgrounds
	Pen: Elwood (3)	Report	Try: Topping; Field; Con: McCall; Pen: McCall (5)	Referee: D. McHugh
Connacht: 1. Dave Kavanagh (Blackrock), 2. Billy Mulcahy (Skerries), 3. Ciaran Shanley (DLSP), 4. Graham Heaslip (Galwegians), 5. J. O'Callaghan (Wanderers), 6. Rory Rogers (Blackrock), 7. Kevin Devlin (c) (St. Mary's), 8. Noel Mannion (Buccaneers), 9. Diarmuid Reddan (Old Crescent), 10. Eric Elwood (Lansdowne), 11. Marcus O'Reilly (Old Belvedere), 12. Brian Carey (UCD), 13. R. Corrigan (Lansdowne), 14. Michael Devine (Buccaneers), 15. Peter Boland (Young Munster).				Referee: D. McHugh
Ulster: 1. Richard Mackey (Malone), 2. Allen Clarke (Northampton), 3. Gary Leslie (Dungannon), 4. Jeremy Davidson (Dungannon), 5. Davy Tweed (Ballymena), 6. Stuart Duncan (Malone), 7. Denis McBride (Malone), 8. Paddy Johns (Dungannon), 9. Neil Doak (NIFC), 10. Mark McCall (Bangor), 11. Jan Cunningham (TCD), 12. Bill Harbinson (c) (Malone), 13. Maurice Field (Malone), 14. James Topping (Ballymena), 15. Jonny Bell (Northampton).

2 December 1995	Irish Exiles (Ireland)	26–42	Leinster	Heywood Road
	Try: Henderson; Saverimutto; Corcoran; Malone; Con: Corcoran (3)	Report	Try: Costello; Gavin; McQuilkin (3); Cunningham; Con: McGowan (3); Pen: McGowan; O'Shea	Referee: J. Cole
Irish Exiles: 1. N. Donovan (Clontarf), 2. David Addleton (Coventry), 3. Gary Halpin (London Irish), 4. John Etheridge (Northampton), 5. S. Smith (Rugby), 6. John Green (Saracens), 7. Darryl O'Grady (Sale), 8. Darren Adams (Racing Club), 9. Chris Saverimutto (Sale), 10. Niall Malone (Leicester), 11. Jim Staples (Harlequins), 12. Paul Flood (London Irish), 13. Rob Henderson (London Irish), 14. Michael Corcoran (London Irish), 15. Simon Mason (Orrell).; Replacements: Barry Walsh (London Irish, for O'Grady)				Referee: J. Cole
Leinster: 1. Henry Hurley (Old Wesley), 2. Shane Byrne (Blackrock College), 3. Paul Wallace (Blackrock College), 4. Brian Rigney (Shannon), 5. Neil Francis (Old Belvedere), 6. Chris Pim (Old Wesley), 7. Victor Costello (St. Mary's College), 8. Stephen Rooney (Lansdowne), 9. Alain Rolland (Blackrock College), 10. Alan McGowan (Blackrock College), 11. Niall Woods (Blackrock College), 12. Kurt McQuilkin (Bective Rangers), 13. Vince Cunningham (St. Mary's College), 14. Paddy Gavin (Old Belvedere), 15. Conor O'Shea (London Irish).; Replacements: Ciaran Clarke (Terenure, for McQuilkin), Niall Hogan (Terenure, for Rolland).

2 December 1995	Munster	20–14	(Ireland) Irish Exiles	Musgrave Park, Cork
	Try: L. Toland (2); Con: Burke (2); Pen: Burke; Drop: Tuohy	Report	Try: Henderson; Malone; Con: Corcoran (2)	Referee: B. Stirling
Munster: 1. P. Spain (Garryowen), 2. Paul Cunningham (Garryowen), 3. Peter Clohessy (Young Munster), 4. Gabriel Fulcher (Cork Constitution), 5. Mick Galwey (Shannon), 6. David Corkery (Terenure), 7. Brian Toland (Old Crescent), 8. Liam Toland (Old Crescent), 9. Stephen McIvor (Garryowen), 10. Paul Burke (Cork Constitution), 11. John Lacey (Sunday's Well), 12. Pat Murray (Shannon, c), 13. Brian Walsh (Cork Constitution), 14. Richard Wallace (Garryowen), 15. Sean McCahill (Sunday's Well).; Replacements: Dominic Crotty (UCC, for Lacey, 77), Stephen Tuohy (Old Crescent, for Burke, 80).				Referee: B. Stirling
Irish Exiles: 1. N. Donovan (Clontarf), 2. David Addleton (Coventry), 3. Clem Boyd (Currie), 4. John Etheridge (Northampton), 5. S. Smith (Rugby), 6. John Green (Saracens), 7. Barry Walsh (London Irish), 8. Darren Adams (Racing Club), 9. Chris Saverimutto (Sale), 10. Niall Malone (Leicester), 11. Simon Geoghegan (Bath), 12. Paul Flood (London Irish), 13. Rob Henderson (London Irish), 14. Michael Corcoran (London Irish), 15. Jim Staples (Harlequins).

2 December 1995	Leinster	41–9	Connacht	Donnybrook Stadium
	Try: O'Shea (2); Hogan; Gavin; McGowan; Con: McGowan (2); Pen: McGowan (3); O'Shea	Report	Pen: Elwood (3)	Referee: B. Smith
Leinster: 1. Paul Flavin (Blackrock College), 2. Shane Byrne (Blackrock College), 3. Paul Wallace (Blackrock College), 4. Malcolm O'Kelly (St. Mary's College), 5. Neil Francis (Old Belvedere), 6. Chris Pim (Old Wesley), 7. Victor Costello (St. Mary's College), 8. Stephen Rooney (Lansdowne), 9. Niall Hogan (Terenure), 10. Alan McGowan (Blackrock College), 11. Niall Woods (Blackrock College), 12. Kurt McQuilkin (Bective Rangers), 13. Vince Cunningham (St. Mary's College), 14. Paddy Gavin (Old Belvedere), 15. Conor O'Shea (London Irish).				Referee: B. Smith
Connacht: 1. Dave Kavanagh (Blackrock), 2. Billy Mulcahy (Skerries), 3. Ciaran Shanley (DLSP), 4. Graham Heaslip (Galwegians), 5. J. O'Callaghan (Wanderers), 6. Rory Rogers (Blackrock), 7. Kevin Devlin (c) (St. Mary's), 8. Noel Mannion (Buccaneers), 9. Diarmuid Reddan (Old Crescent), 10. Eric Elwood (Lansdowne), 11. Marcus O'Reilly (Old Belvedere), 12. Brian Carey (UCD), 13. R. Corrigan (Lansdowne), 14. Michael Devine (Buccaneers), 15. Peter Boland (Young Munster).; Replacements: Mervyn Murphy (Galwegians, for Carey, 62), Davie Henshaw (Buccaneers, for Kavanagh, 66)

16 December 1995	Ulster	29–3	(Ireland) Irish Exiles	Ravenhill
	Try: Cunningham; Tweed; Harbinson; Con: McCall; Pen: McCall (4)	Report	Pen: Corcoran	Referee: R. McDowell
Ulster: 1. Richard Mackey (Malone), 2. Allen Clarke (Northampton), 3. Gary Leslie (Dungannon), 4. Jeremy Davidson (Dungannon), 5. Davy Tweed (Ballymena), 6. Stuart Duncan (Malone), 7. Denis McBride (Malone), 8. Paddy Johns (Dungannon), 9. Andrew Matchett (Ballymena), 10. Mark McCall (Bangor), 11. Jan Cunningham (TCD), 12. Bill Harbinson (c, Malone), 13. Maurice Field (Malone), 14. James Topping (Ballymena), 15. Jonny Bell (Northampton).; Replacements: Simon Booth (Ballymena, for Mackey, 59)				Referee: R. McDowell
Irish Exiles: 1. G. Harper (London Irish), 2. David Addleton (Coventry), 3. Clem Boyd (Currie), 4. John Etheridge (Northampton), 5. S. Smith (Rugby), 6. John Green (Saracens), 7. Barry Walsh (London Irish), 8. Darren Adams (Racing Club), 9. Chris Saverimutto (Sale), 10. Niall Malone (Leicester), 11. John Gallagher (Harlequins), 12. Paul Flood (London Irish), 13. Rob Henderson (London Irish), 14. Michael Corcoran (London Irish), 15. Jim Staples (c, Harlequins).; Replacements: Brian Wellens (Liverpool St. Helens, for Flood), Simon Mason (Orrell, for Staples), Robin Saverimutto (Coventry, for C. Saverimutto), Darryl O'Grady (Sale, for Green)

16 December 1995	Munster	15–19	Leinster	Thomond Park
	Try: R. Wallace (2); Con: Murray; Pen: Murray	Report	Try: Rolland; Con: McGowan; Pen: McGowan (4)	Referee: A. Watson
Munster: 1. Paul McCarthy (Constitution), 2. Paul Cunningham (Garryowen), 3. Peter Clohessy (Young Munster), 4. Gabriel Fulcher (Cork Constitution), 5. Mick Galwey (Shannon), 6. David Corkery (Terenure), 7. Brian Toland (Old Crescent), 8. Liam Toland (Old Crescent), 9. Stephen McIvor (Garryowen), 10. Paul Burke (Cork Constitution), 11. Dominic Crotty (UCC), 12. Sean McCahill (Sunday's Well), 13. Brian Walsh (Cork Constitution), 14. Richard Wallace (Garryowen), 15. Pat Murray (Shannon, c).				Referee: A. Watson
Leinster: 1. Henry Hurley (Old Wesley), 2. Shane Byrne (Blackrock College), 3. Paul Wallace (Blackrock College), 4. Steve Jameson (St. Mary's College), 5. Neil Francis (Old Belvedere), 6. Chris Pim (Old Wesley, c), 7. Victor Costello (St. Mary's College), 8. Stephen Rooney (Lansdowne), 9. Alain Rolland (Blackrock College), 10. Alan McGowan (Blackrock College), 11. Niall Woods (Blackrock College), 12. Kurt McQuilkin (Bective Rangers), 13. Vince Cunningham (St. Mary's College), 14. Paddy Gavin (Old Belvedere), 15. Conor O'Shea (London Irish).

23 December 1995	Leinster	31–3	Ulster	Donnybrook
	Try: Wallace; Jameson; Gavin; Con: McGowan (2); Pen: McGowan (4)	Report	Pen: McCall	Referee: C. White
Leinster: 1. Henry Hurley (Old Wesley), 2. Shane Byrne (Blackrock College), 3. Paul Wallace (Blackrock College), 4. Steve Jameson (St. Mary's College), 5. Neil Francis (Old Belvedere), 6. Chris Pim (Old Wesley, c), 7. Victor Costello (St. Mary's College), 8. Stephen Rooney (Lansdowne), 9. Alain Rolland (Blackrock College), 10. Alan McGowan (Blackrock College), 11. Niall Woods (Blackrock College), 12. Kurt McQuilkin (Bective Rangers), 13. Vince Cunningham (St. Mary's College), 14. Paddy Gavin (Old Belvedere), 15. Conor O'Shea (London Irish).; Replacement: Ciaran Clarke (Terenure, for Woods).				Referee: C. White
Ulster: 1. Richard Mackey (Malone), 2. Allen Clarke (Northampton), 3. Gary Leslie (Dungannon), 4. Jeremy Davidson (Dungannon), 5. Davy Tweed (Ballymena), 6. Stuart Duncan (Malone), 7. Denis McBride (Malone), 8. Paddy Johns (Dungannon), 9. Andrew Matchett (Ballymena), 10. Mark McCall (Bangor), 11. Jan Cunningham (TCD), 12. Bill Harbinson (c, Malone), 13. Maurice Field (Malone), 14. James Topping (Ballymena), 15. Jonny Bell (Northampton).

23 December 1995	Connacht	11–46	Munster	Galway Sportsgrounds
	Try: Heaslip; Pen: Elwood (2)	Report	Try: McIvor; P. Clohessy; Crotty; D. Clohessy; Walsh; L. Toland; Con: Smith (5); Pen: Smith (2)	Referee: A. Lewis
Connacht: 1. Dave Kavanagh (Blackrock), 2. Billy Mulcahy (Skerries), 3. Ciaran Shanley (DLSP), 4. Graham Heaslip (Galwegians), 5. J. O'Callaghan (Wanderers), 6. Rory Rogers (Blackrock), 7. Kevin Devlin (c) (St. Mary's), 8. Noel Mannion (Buccaneers), 9. Diarmuid Reddan (Old Crescent), 10. Eric Elwood (Lansdowne), 11. Marcus O'Reilly (Old Belvedere), 12. Brian Carey (UCD), 13. R. Corrigan (Lansdowne), 14. Nigel Carolan (Galwegians), 15. Aidan White.; Replacement: Mervyn Murphy (Galwegians, for Carey, 58)				Referee: A. Lewis
Munster: 1. P. Spain (Garryowen), 2. Paul Cunningham (Garryowen), 3. Peter Clohessy (Young Munster), 4. Gabriel Fulcher (Cork Constitution), 5. Mick Galwey (Shannon), 6. Des Clohessy, (Young Munster), 7. Brian Toland (Old Crescent), 8. Liam Toland (Old Crescent), 9. Stephen McIvor (Garryowen), 10. Paul Burke (Cork Constitution), 11. Kenny Smith (Garryowen), 12. Sean McCahill (Sunday's Well), 13. Brian Walsh (Cork Constitution), 14. Richard Wallace (Garryowen), 15. Dominic Crotty (UCC).; Replacements: G. Aherne (Lansdowne, for McIvor, 61), C. Twomey (Cork Constitution, for Cunningham, 62), Stephen Tuohy (Old Crescent, for Burke, 68).

=== 1996 ===
The 1996 Interprovincial Championship was sponsored by Guinness in a three-year deal worth £115,000, taking over from the previous sponsors, Smithwicks. The Irish Exiles were no longer able to compete as matches clashed with club games in England.

At this stage the Irish provinces were still representative teams, not professional clubs. However, the provinces were now offering contracts and match fees for Heineken Cup and Interprovincial matches, although these contracts sometimes conflicted with players contracted to clubs in England.

Team	P	W	D	L	F	A	BP	Pts	Status
Munster	3	3	0	0	117	92	-	6	Champions; qualified for 1997–98 Heineken Cup
Leinster	3	1	0	2	88	92	-	2	Qualified for 1997–98 Heineken Cup
Ulster	3	1	0	2	81	89	-	2	Qualified for 1997–98 Heineken Cup
Connacht	3	1	0	2	77	90	-	2	Qualified for 1997–98 European Challenge Cup

21 September 1996	Munster	45–28	Connacht	Temple Hill
	Try: Lacey (2); Foley; McCahill; Walsh; Con: O'Halloran (4); Pen: O'Halloran (3); Drop: O'Halloran	Report	Try: A. Reddan; Devine (2); Con: Elwood (2); Pen: Elwood (3)	Referee: A. Watson
Munster lineup: 1. Ian Murray (Cork Constitution), 2. Paul Cunningham (Garryowen), 3. Noel Healy (Shannon), 4. Mick Galwey (c, Shannon), 5. Len Dineen (Old Crescent); 6. Anthony Foley (Shannon), 7. Ben Cronin (Garryowen), 8. Eddie Halvey (Shannon), 9. Stephen McIvor (Garryowen), 10. Aidan O'Halloran (Young Munster), 11. Andrew Thompson (Shannon), 12. Mike Lynch (Young Munster), 13. Brian Walsh (Cork Constitution), 14. John Lacey (Sunday's Well), 15. Sean McCahill (Sunday's Well).; Replacement: Pat Murray (Shannon, for Lacey).				Referee: A. Watson
Connacht lineup: 1. John Maher (Old Belvedere), 2. Billy Mulcahy (Skerries), 3. R. Ward (Old Belvedere), 4. Graham Heaslip (Galwegians), 5. Mick O'Neill (Blackrock), 6. Rory Rogers (Blackrock), 7. Barry Gavin (Galwegians), 8. Kevin Devlin (St. Mary's, c), 9. Conor McGuinness (St. Mary's), 10. Eric Elwood (Lansdowne), 11. Dermot Finnegan (Wanderers), 12. Nicky Barry (Clontarf), 13. Alan Reddan (Lansdowne), 14. Michael Devine (Buccaneers), 15. Brian Carey (Blackrock).; Replacements: Nigel Carolan (Corinthians, for Barry), Diarmuid Reddan (Galwegians, for Carey).

21 September 1996	Ulster	25-35	Leinster	Ravenhill
	Try: Ritchie; Duncan; Topping; Con: Laing (2); Pen: Laing (2)	Preview; Report	Try: McKenna (2); Jameson; Spicer; Con: Governey (3); Pen: Governey (3)	Referee: L. Mayne
Ulster lineup: 1. Richard Mackey (Malone), 2. Stephen Ritchie (Ballymena), 3. Clem Boyd (Currie), 4. Gary Longwell (Ballymena), 5. Charlie Simpson (Dungannon), 6. Stuart Duncan (Malone), 7. Denis McBride (c, Malone), 8. Stephen McKinty (Bangor), 9. Stephen Bell (Dungannon), 10. Stuart Laing (Portadown), 11. Jan Cunningham (TCD), 12. Mark McCall (Dungannon), 13. Maurice Field (Malone), 14. James Topping (Ballymena), 15. Robin Morrow (QUB).				Referee: L. Mayne
Leinster lineup: 1. Henry Hurley (Old Wesley), 2. Mark McDermott (Lansdowne), 3. Angus McKeen (Lansdowne), 4. Steve Jameson (St. Mary's College), 5. Greg Duffy, 6. Chris Pim (Old Wesley, c), 7. Dean Oswald (Blackrock), 8. Kevin Spicer (Oxford), 9. Niall Hogan (Oxford), 10. Richard Governey (Lansdowne), 11. Denis Hickie (St. Mary's), 12. Kurt McQuilkin (Lansdowne), 13. Martin Ridge (Old Belvedere), 14. David Coleman (Terenure), 15. Peter McKenna (Old Belvedere).

28 September 1996	Ulster	32-27	Connacht	Ravenhill
	Try: Duncan; Laing; Topping; Con: Laing; Pen: Laing (5)	Report	Try: Carey; Elwood; Con: Elwood; Pen: Elwood (5); Drop: Elwood	Referee: B. Smith
Ulster lineup: 1. Richard Mackey (Malone), 2. Stephen Ritchie (Ballymena), 3. Clem Boyd (Currie), 4. Gary Longwell (Ballymena), 5. Alan Robinson (Ballymena), 6. Stuart Duncan (Malone), 7. Denis McBride (c, Malone), 8. Stephen McKinty (Bangor), 9. Stephen Bell (Dungannon), 10. Stuart Laing (Portadown), 11. Jan Cunningham (TCD), 12. Mark McCall (Dungannon), 13. Maurice Field (Malone), 14. James Topping (Ballymena), 15. Robin Morrow (QUB).				Referee: B. Smith
Connacht lineup: 1. John Maher (Old Belvedere), 2. Billy Mulcahy (Skerries, 3. R. Ward (Old Belevdere), 4. Graham Heaslip (Galwegians), 5. Shane Leahy (Lansdowne), 6. Rory Rogers (Blackrock), 7. Barry Gavin (Galwegians), 8. Kevin Devlin (St. Mary's, c), 9. Conor McGuinness (St. Mary's), 10. Eric Elwood (Lansdowne), 11. Dermot Finnegan (Wanderers), 12. Nigel Carolan (Corinthians), 13. Alan Reddan (Lansdowne), 14. Michael Devine (Buccaneers), 15. Brian Carey (Blackrock).

28 September 1996	Leinster	40–45	Munster	Donnybrook
	Try: Coleman; Ridge; McQuilkin; Francis; Hickie; Con: Governey (3); Pen: Governey (3)	Report	Try: Galwey (2); Halvey; Con: Begley; Lynch (2); Pen: Begley (8); Lynch (2); Drop: Keane	Referee: Graham Hughes
Leinster lineup: 1. Henry Hurley (Moseley), 2. Mark McDermott (Lansdowne), 3. Angus McKeen (Lansdowne), 4. Steve Jameson (St Mary's), 5. Neil Francis (Old Belvedere), 6. Chris Pim (Old Wesley, c), 7. Stephen Rooney (Lansdowne), 8. Kevin Spicer (Oxford), 9. Alain Rolland (Blackrock), 10. Richard Governey, 11. Denis Hickie (St Mary's), 12. Kurt McQuilkin (Lansdowne), 13. Martin Ridge (Old Belvedere), 14. David Coleman (Terenure), 15. Peter McKenna (Old Belvedere).; Replacements: Girvan Dempsey (Terenure, for Coleman), Paul Flavin (Blackrock, for McKeen).				Referee: Graham Hughes
Munster lineup: 1. Ian Murray (Cork Constitution), 2. Terry Kingston (Dolphin), 3. Noel Healy (Shannon), 4. Len Dineen (Old Crescent), 5. Mick Galwey (Shannon), 6. Anthony Foley (Shannon), 7. Ben Cronin (Garryowen), 8. Eddie Halvey (Shannon), 9. Stephen McIvor (Garryowen), 10. Killian Keane (Garryowen), 11. Brian Begley (Old Crescent), 12. Brian Walsh (Cork Constitution), 13. Mike Lynch (Young Munster), 14. Sean McCahill (Sunday's Well), 15. Dominic Crotty (Garryowen).; Replacements: Andrew Thompson (Shannon, for Begley 39')

5 October 1996	Munster	27-24	Ulster	Thomond Park
	Try: Dineen; Galwey; Con: Begley; Pen: Begley (3); Drop: McIvor; Keane	Report	Try: Duncan; Coulter; Con: Laing; Pen: Laing (4)	Referee: A. Lewis
Munster lineup: 1. Ian Murray (Cork Constitution), 2. Terry Kingston (Dolphin), 3. Noel Healy (Shannon), 4. Len Dineen (Old Crescent), 5. Mick Galwey (Shannon), 6. Anthony Foley (Shannon), 7. Ben Cronin (Garryowen), 8. Eddie Halvey (Shannon), 9. Stephen McIvor (Garryowen), 10. Killian Keane (Garryowen), 11. Brian Begley (Old Crescent), 12. Mike Lynch (Young Munster), 13. Brian Walsh (Cork Constitution), 14. Sean McCahill (Sunday's Well), 15. Dominic Crotty (Garryowen).; Replacements: Paul McCarthy (Cork Constitution, for Healy 69')				Referee: A. Lewis
Ulster lineup: 1. Richard Mackey (Malone), 2. Stephen Ritchie (Ballymena), 3. Clem Boyd (Currie), 4. Gary Longwell (Ballymena), 5. Alan Robinson (Ballymena), 6. Stuart Duncan, 7. Denis McBride (c, Malone), 8. Stephen McKinty (Bangor), 9. Stephen Bell (Dungannon), 10. Stuart Laing (Portadown), 11. Jan Cunningham (TCD), 12. Sheldon Coulter (Ballymena), 13. Mark McCall (Dungannon), 14. James Topping (Ballymena), 15. Robin Morrow (QUB).

5 October 1996	Connacht	22-13	Leinster	Galway Sportsgrounds
	Try: Leahy; Elwood; Pen: Elwood (3)	Report	Try: Francis; Con: Governey; Pen: Governey (2)
Connacht lineup: 1. John Maher (Old Belevdere), 2. Billy Mulcahy (Skerries), 3. R. Ward (Old Belvedere), 4. Graham Heaslip (Galwegians), 5. Shane Leahy (Lansdowne), 6. Rory Rogers (Blackrock), 7. Barry Gavin (Galwegians), 8. Kevin Devlin (St. Mary's, c), 9. Conor McGuinness (St. May's), 10. Eric Elwood (Lansdowne), 11. Mick Kearin (Lansdowne), 12. Nigel Carolan (Corinthians), 13. Alan Reddan (Lansdown), 14. Michael Devine (Buccaneers), 15. Brian Carey (Blackrock).
Leinster lineup: 1. Paul Flavin (Blackrock), 2. Mark McDermott (Lansdowne), 3. Angus McKeen (Lansdowne), 4. Steve Jameson (St Mary's), 5. Neil Francis (Old Belvedere), 6. Kelvin Leahy (Wanderers), 7. Kevin Spicer (Oxford), 8. Stephen Rooney (Lansdowne), 9. Alain Rolland (Blackrock) (c), 10. Richard Governey (Lansdowne), 11. Darragh O'Mahony (Lansdowne), 12. Kurt McQuilkin (Lansdowne), 13. Martin Ridge (Old Belvedere), 14. Paddy Gavin (Old Belvedere), 15. Peter McKenna (Old Belvedere).; Replacements: Shane Byrne (Blackrock, for McDermott 30'), Vince Cunningham (St Mary's, for Ridge 35'), Greg Duffy (Old Wesley, for Francis 38').

=== 1997 ===
The IRFU offered new contracts for provincial players for this season. Full-time players would receive a retainer of £25,000, plus a win bonus of £500 for Heineken Cup matches. Part-time players would be paid a retainer of £7,500, plus a match fee of £400 for Interprovincial matches and £800 for the Heineken Cup, and a win bonus of £450 for both competitions. Each province could have a maximum of 30 contracted players.

Team	P	W	D	L	F	A	BP	Pts	Status
Leinster	3	2	0	1	61	46	-	4	Champions; qualified for 1998–99 Heineken Cup
Munster	3	2	0	1	56	43	-	4	Qualified for 1998–99 Heineken Cup
Ulster	3	1	0	2	59	65	-	2	Qualified for 1998–99 Heineken Cup
Connacht	3	1	0	2	42	64	-	2	Qualified for 1998–99 European Challenge Cup

16 August 1997	Leinster	26-25	Ulster	Donnybrook
	Try: Rolland; Hickie; O'Mahony; Con: Rolland; Pen: Governey (3)	Report	Try: Laing; Con: Laing; Pen: Laing (6)	Referee: David McHugh
Leinster lineup: 1. Henry Hurley, 2. Shane Byrne, 3. Angus McKeen, 4. Declan O'Brien, 5. Aaron Freeman, 6. Trevor Brennan, 7. Victor Costello, 8. Stephen Rooney, 9. Alain Rolland, 10. Richard McGoverney, 11. Darragh O'Mahony, 12. Kurt McQuilkin, 13. Martin Ridge, 14. Denis Hickie, 15. Ciran Clarke.; Replacements: Reggie Corrigan (for McKeen 45'), Steve Jameson for O'Brien 72'), C. McEntee (for Brennan 72').				Referee: David McHugh
Ulster lineup: 1. Richard Mackey, 2. Stephen Ritchie, 3. Gary Leslie, 4. Tony McWhirter, 5. Gary Longwell, 6. Roger Wilson, 7. Stephen McKinty, 8. Andy Ward, 9. Kenton Hillman, 10. Stuart Laing, 11. Graeme McCluskey, 12. Stan McDowell, 13. Sheldon Coulter, 14. Jan Cunningham, 15. Robin Morrow.; Replacements: Rab Irwin (for Leslie).

16 August 1997	Connacht	9–29	Munster	Galway Sportsgrounds
	Pen: Elwood (3)	Report	Try: Halvey; O'Gara; Galwey; Con: O'Gara; Pen: O'Gara; Drop: O'Gara
Connacht lineup: 1. John Maher, 2. Billy Mulcahy, 3. Martin Cahill, 4. Graham Heaslip, 5. Mark McConnell, 6. Rory Rogers, 7. Barry Gavin, 8. Junior Charlie, 9. Conor McGuinness, 10. Eric Elwood, 11. Nigel Carolan, 12. S. Allnutt, 13. Pat Duignan, 14. Nicky Barry, 15. Willie Ruane.; Replacements: Bernard Jackman (for Mulcahy), Mick O'Neill (for Rogers), R, Ward (for Cahel).

23 August 1997	Connacht	27-17	Ulster	Galway Sportsgrounds
	Try: McEntee; Murphy; Charlie; Con: Elwood (3); Pen: Elwood (2)	Report	Try: McDowell (2); Con: Laing (2); Pen: Laing	Referee: L. Mayne
Connacht lineup: 1. John Maher, 2. Billy Mulcahy, 3. Michael Finlay, 4. Graham Heaslip, 5. Mark McConnell, 6. Shane McEntee, 7. Junior Charlie, 8. Barry Gavin, 9. Conor McGuinness, 10. Eric Elwood, 11. Nigel Carolan, 12. Pat Duignan, 13. S. Allnutt, 14. Nicky Barry, 15. Willie Ruane.; Replacement: Mervyn Murphy (for Allnutt).				Referee: L. Mayne
Ulster lineup: 1. Richard Mackey, 2. Stephen Ritchie, 3. Gary Leslie, 4. Tony McWhirter, 5. Gary Longwell, 6. Stephen McKinty, 7. Roger Wilson, 8. Andy Ward, 9. Stephen Bell, 10. Stuart Laing, 11. Jan Cunningham, 12. Stan McDowell, 13. Sheldon Coulter, 14. Andy Park, 15. Robin Morrow.

23 August 1997	Munster	15–12	Leinster	Mardyke
	Pen: O'Gara; Mahoney (3); Drop: O'Gara	Report	Pen: McGowan (4)
Leinster lineup: 1. Henry Hurley, 2. Shane Byrne, 3. Angus McKeen, 4. Steve Jameson, 5. Aaron Freeman, 6. Colin McEntee, 7. Trevor Brennan, 8. Victor Costello, 9. David O'Mahony, 10. Alan McGowan, 11. Darragh O'Mahony, 12. Kurt McQuilkin, 13. Martin Ridge, 14. Denis Hickie, 15. Ciran Clarke.; Replacements: Declan O'Brien (for Freeman 66')

30 August 1997	Ulster	22-12	Munster	Ravenhill
	Try: Park; Con: Laing; Pen: Laing (4); Drop: Laing	Report	Pen: O'Gara (4)	Referee: M. White
Ulster lineup: 1. Richard Mackey, 2. Stephen Ritchie, 3. Gary Leslie, 4. Tony McWhirter, 5. Gary Longwell, 6. Stephen McKinty, 7. Keith Gallick, 8. Andy Ward, 9. Stephen Bell, 10. Stuart Laing, 11. Sheldon Coulter, 12. Maurice Field, 13. Jan Cunningham, 14. Andy Park, 15. Robin Morrow.				Referee: M. White

30 August 1997	Leinster	23-6	Connacht	Donnybrook Stadium
	Try: Ridge; Con: McGowan; Pen: McGowan (3)	Report	Pen: Elwood (2)	Referee: D. McHugh
Leinster lineup: 1. Reggie Corrigan, 2. Shane Byrne, 3. Angus McKeen, 4. Steve Jameson, 5. Aaron Freeman, 6. Trevor Brennan, 7. Tony Goldfinch, 8. Victor Costello, 9. David O'Mahony, 10. Alan McGowan, 11. John McWeeney, 12. Kurt McQuilkin (c), 13. Martin Ridge, 14. Denis Hickie, 15. Kevin Nowlan.; Replacements: Declan O'Brien (for Jameson 70')				Referee: D. McHugh
Connacht lineup: 1. John Maher, 2. Billy Mulcahy, 3. Michael Finlay, 4. Graham Heaslip, 5. Mark McConnell, 6. Rory Rogers, 7. Shane McEntee, 8. Barry Gavin, 9. Conor McGuinness, 10. Eric Elwood, 11. Nigel Carolan, 12. Pat Duignan, 13. S. Allnutt, 14. Nicky Barry, 15. Willie Ruane.; Replacements: Russell Southam (for Ruane 53'), Bernard Jackman (for Mulcahy 68'), R. Ward (for Maher 79').

=== 1998 ===
This season, the tournament adopted a new format, with each team playing each other home and away. The tournament points system was adopted from Super 12 and the Tri Nations, with four points for a win and two for a draw, a bonus point for scoring four or more tries in a match, and a bonus point for losing by seven points or less. This led to an average of over four tries scored per match.

The tournament was strengthened by a drive by Ireland coach Warren Gatland to bring Irish players who had signed contracts with English clubs back to Ireland to play in the Interprovincial Championship and Heineken Cup. The provinces would have squads of 30 players, most of whom would be full-time professionals.

The title came down to a decider between Leinster and Munster at Donnybrook, with both teams level on points going into the final weekend. Munster took the title with a win, thanks to a man-of-the-match performance by Alan Quinlan.

Tony Ward, writing in the Irish Independent, selected the following as Team of the Championship:

1. Peter Clohessy (Munster), 2. Mark McDermott (Munster), 3. Angus McKeen (Leinster), 4. Mick Galwey (Munster), 5. Eddie Halvey (Munster), 6. Ian Dillon (Connacht), 7. Andy Ward (Ulster), 8. Alan Quinlan (Munster), 9. Conor McGuinness (Connacht), 10. David Humphreys (Ulster), 11. Girvan Dempsey (Leinster), 12. Pat Duignan (Connacht), 13. Jonathan Bell (Ulster), 14. John Lacey (Munster), 15. Brian Roche (Munster).

Team	P	W	D	L	F	A	BP	Pts	Status
Munster	6	4	0	2	125	92	2	18	Champions; qualified for 1999–2000 Heineken Cup
Ulster	6	3	0	3	137	119	3	15	Qualified for 1999–2000 Heineken Cup
Leinster	6	3	0	3	135	136	2	14	Qualified for 1999–2000 Heineken Cup
Connacht	6	2	0	4	95	145	3	11	Qualified for 1999–2000 European Challenge Cup

14 August 1998	Leinster	14-34	Ulster	Donnybrook
	Try: Horgan; Nowlan; Pen: McGowan (2)	Report	Try: Ward (2); McWhirter; McDowell; Con: Mason (4); Pen: Mason (2)
Ulster: 1. Justin Fitzpatrick, 2. Allen Clarke, 3. Gary Leslie, 4. Murtagh Rea, 5. Gary Longwell, 6. Stephen McKinty, 7. Andy Ward 8. Tony McWhirter, 9. Stephen Bell, 10. David Humphreys, 11. Andy Park, 12. Mark McCall (c), 13. Stan McDowell, 14. Jan Cunningham, 15. Simon Mason.

15 August 1998	Connacht	13–18	Munster	Galway Sportsgrounds
		Report

21 August 1998	Munster	18–24	Leinster	Dooradoyle
		Report

22 August 1998	Connacht	21-18	Ulster	Galway Sportsgrounds
	Try: Duignan (2); Murphy; Con: Elwood (3)	Report	Try: Cunningham; Ward; Con: Mason; Pen: Mason (2)
Ulster: 1. Justin Fitzpatrick, 2. Allen Clarke, 3. Gary Leslie, 4. Murtagh Rea, 5. Gary Longwell, 6. Stephen McKinty, 7. Andy Ward 8. Tony McWhirter, 9. Stephen Bell, 10. David Humphreys, 11. Andy Park, 12. Mark McCall (c), 13. Stan McDowell, 14. Jan Cunningham, 15. Simon Mason.

28 August 1998	Leinster	29-24	Connacht	Donnybrook Stadium
		Report

4 September 1998	Ulster	29-12	Munster	Ravenhill
	Try: J. Cunningham; Rea; Con: Mason (2); Pen: Mason (5)	Report	Pen: Keane (4)
Ulster: 1. Justin Fitzpatrick, 2. Allen Clarke, 3. Gary Leslie, 4. Murtagh Rea, 5. Gary Longwell, 6. Dean Macartney (c), 7. Andy Ward, 8. Tony McWhirter, 9. Andrew Matchett, 10. David Humphreys, 11. Andy Park, 12. Jan Cunningham, 13. Jonny Bell, 14. Jonathan Davis, 15. Simon Mason. Replacements: Stuart Duncan (for Macartney, 63), Rab Irwin (for Fitzpatrick, 79)

11 September 1998	Ulster	11-35	Leinster	Ravenhill
	Try: Rea; Pen: Mason (2)	Report	Try: Nowlan (2); Hegarty; Holden; Hickie; Con: McGowan (2); Pen: McGowan (2)
Ulster: 1. Justin Fitzpatrick, 2. Allen Clarke, 3. Gary Leslie, 4. Murtagh Rea, 5. Gary Longwell, 6. Dean Macartney (c), 7. Andy Ward, 8. Tony McWhirter, 9. Andrew Matchett, 10. David Humphreys, 11. Andy Park, 12. Jan Cunningham, 13. Jonny Bell, 14. Jonathan Davis, 15. Simon Mason. Replacements: Bryn Cunningham (for Humphreys, 20), Stephen McKinty (for Macartney, 46), Sheldon Coulter (for Davis 52), Rab Irwin (for Fitzpatrick, 63), Stuart Duncan (for McWhirter, 73), Stephen Bell (for Matchett, 74)

12 September 1998	Munster	21–7	Connacht	Dooradoyle
		Report

3 October 1998	Munster	31-9	Ulster	Musgrave Park
	Try: Lacey; Horgan; Foley; Galwey; Con: Lynch; Pen: Lynch (3)	Report	Pen: Mason (2); Drop: Humphreys
Ulster: 1. Justin Fitzpatrick, 2. Allen Clarke, 3. Gary Leslie, 4. Murtagh Rea, 5. Gary Longwell, 6. Dean Macartney (c), 7. Andy Ward 8. Stephen McKinty, 9. Andrew Matchett, 10. David Humphreys, 11. Stan McDowell, 12. Clinton van Rensburg, 13. Jonny Bell, 14. Sheldon Coulter, 15. Simon Mason.

3 October 1998	Connacht	24-23	Leinster	Galway Sportsgrounds
		Report

23 October 1998	Ulster	36-6	Connacht	Ravenhill
	Try: Ward; McKinty; Topping; Clarke; Mason; Con: Mason (4); Pen: Mason	Report	Pen: Allnutt (2)	Referee: David McHugh
Ulster: 1. Justin Fitzpatrick, 2. Allen Clarke, 3. Rab Irwin, 4. Mark Blair, 5. Gary Longwell, 6. Stephen McKinty, 7. Andy Ward, 8. Eric Miller, 9. Stephen Bell, 10. David Humphreys (c), 11. Jan Cunningham, 12. Clinton van Rensburg, 13. Jonny Bell, 14. James Topping, 15. Simon Mason. Replacements: Gary Leslie (for Irwin, 53), Tony McWhirter (for McKinty, 61), Richard Weir (for Clarke, 71) Sheldon Coulter (for J. Cunningham, 80).				Referee: David McHugh

23 October 1998	Leinster	10–25	Munster	Donnybrook
		Report

=== 1999 ===
Team	P	W	D	L	F	A	BP	Pts	Status
Munster	6	6	0	0	242	103	5	29	Champions; qualified for 2000–01 Heineken Cup
Ulster	6	3	0	3	186	129	3	15	Qualified for next season's Heineken Cup
Leinster	6	2	0	4	145	137	2	10	Qualified for 2000–01 Heineken Cup
Connacht	6	0	0	6	85	289	1	1	Qualified 2000–01 European Challenge Cup

7 August 1999	Connacht	9-50	Ulster	Galway Sportsgrounds
	Pen: Elwood (3)	Report	Try: J. Topping; McWhirter; Cunningham; O'Cuinneagain; Howe; Clarke; Con: Mason (3); Pen: Mason (3)	Referee: M. White
Ulster: 1. Justin Fitzpatrick, 2. Allen Clarke, 3. Gary Leslie, 4. Paddy Johns, 5. Gary Longwell, 6. Dion O'Cuinneagain, 7. Andy Ward, 8. Tony McWhirter, 9. Stephen Bell, 10. David Humphreys (c), 11. Tyrone Howe, 12. Jonny Bell, 13. Jan Cunningham, 14. James Topping, 15. Simon Mason. Replacements: Mark Blair (for Longwell, 59), Eric Miller (for McWhirter, 59), Riaz Fredericks (for Howe, 66), Niall Malone (for Humphreys, 66), Simon Best (for Leslie, 71).				Referee: M. White

7 August 1999	Munster	31–20	Leinster	Temple Hill
		Report

13 August 1999	Leinster	15-26	Ulster	Donnybrook
	Pen: Everitt (5)	Report	Try: Howe; Mason; Con: Mason (2); Pen: Mason (3); Drop: Humphreys
Ulster: 1. Justin Fitzpatrick, 2. Allen Clarke, 3. Gary Leslie, 4. Paddy Johns, 5. Gary Longwell, 6. Dion O'Cuinneagain, 7. Andy Ward, 8. Eric Miller, 9. Stephen Bell, 10. David Humphreys (c), 11. Tyrone Howe, 12. Jonny Bell, 13. Jan Cunningham, 14. James Topping, 15. Simon Mason. Replacements: Tony McWhirter (for Miller, 48), Riaz Fredericks (for Cunningham, 58), Mark Blair (for Longwell, 60), Richard Weir (for Clarke, 83).

14 August 1999	Connacht	17–67	Munster	Galway Sportsgrounds
		Report

3 September 1999	Leinster	22-19	Connacht	Donnybrook Stadium
		Report

5 September 1999	Ulster	24-25	Munster	Upper Malone
	Try: Bromley; Fredericks; Con: Mason; Pen: Mason (3); Drop: Humphreys	Report	Try: Mullins (2); Corkery; Con: O'Gara (2); Pen: O'Gara (2)
Ulster: 1. Justin Fitzpatrick, 2. Allen Clarke, 3. Gary Leslie, 4. Paddy Johns, 5. Gary Longwell, 6. Dion O'Cuinneagain, 7. Andy Ward, 8. Eric Miller, 9. Andrew Matchett, 10. David Humphreys (c), 11. Spencer Bromley, 12. Jonny Bell, 13. Jan Cunningham, 14. James Topping, 15. Simon Mason. Replacements: Richard Weir (for Clarke, 23), Tony McWhirter (for Miller, 55), Mark Blair (for Longwell, 50), Simon Best (for Leslie, 66) Riaz Fredericks (for Cunningham, 71).

29 October 1999	Munster	36-19	Ulster	Musgrave Park
	Try: O'Neill; Mullins; Con: O'Gara; Pen: O'Gara (8)	Report	Try: Topping; Con: Mason; Pen: Mason (4)
Ulster: 1. Justin Fitzpatrick, 2. Allen Clarke, 3. Simon Best, 4. Mark Blair, 5. Gary Longwell, 6. Dion O'Cuinneagain, 7. Andy Ward, 8. Tony McWhirter, 9. Stephen Bell, 10. David Humphreys (c), 11. Spencer Bromley, 12. Riaz Fredericks, 13. Jonny Bell, 14. James Topping, 15. Simon Mason. Replacements: Paddy Johns (for Blair, 46), Eric Miller (for O'Cuinneagain, 52), L. Johnston (for Best, 63) Jan Cunningham (for Topping, 72)

30 October 1999	Connacht	8-53	Leinster	Musgrave Park
		Report

5 November 1999	Ulster	44-22	Connacht	Ravenhill
	Try: Bromley (2); Blair; McWhirter; Cunningham; Ward; Con: Mason (4); Pen: Mason (2)	Report	Try: Steffert; Mostyn; Con: Elwood; Pen: Elwood
Ulster: 1. Justin Fitzpatrick, 2. Allen Clarke, 3. Simon Best, 4. Paddy Johns, 5. Mark Blair, 6. Mark Blair, 7. Andy Ward, 8. Tony McWhirter, 9. Stephen Bell, 10. David Humphreys (c), 11. Spencer Bromley, 12. Jonny Bell, 13. Jan Cunningham, 14. James Topping, 15. Simon Mason. Replacements: Stephen McKinty (for Miller, 40), Gary Longwell (for Blair, 60), Niall Malone (for Humphreys, 67).

5 November 1999	Leinster	13–30	Munster	Donnybrook
		Report

12 November 1999	Ulster	22-23	Leinster	Ravenhill
	Try: Bromley; Con: Mason; Pen: Mason (5)	Report	Try: Hickie; Pen: McHugh (6)
Ulster: 1. Rab Irwin, 2. Richard Weir, 3. Simon Best, 4. Mark Blair, 5. Gary Longwell, 6. Eric Miller, 7. Andy Ward, 8. Tony McWhirter, 9. Mark Edwards, 10. David Humphreys (c), 11. Spencer Bromley, 12. Niall Malone, 13. Jan Cunningham, 14. Sheldon Coulter, 15. Simon Mason. Replacements: Gary Leslie (for Irwin, 52), Allen Clarke (for Humphreys, 55), Stephen Bell (for Edwards, 63)

12 November 1999	Munster	53–10	Connacht	Thomond Park
		Report

=== 2000 ===
Team	P	W	D	L	F	A	BP	Pts	Status
Munster	6	5	1	0	151	99	1	23	Champions; qualified for 2001–02 Heineken Cup
Ulster	6	3	0	3	144	119	3	15	Qualified for 2001–02 Heineken Cup
Leinster	6	2	1	3	109	111	2	12	Qualified for 2001–02 Heineken Cup
Connacht	6	1	0	5	100	175	1	5	Qualified for 2001–02 European Challenge Cup

1 September 2000	Ulster	16-21	Munster	Ravenhill
	Try: Ward; Con: Humphreys; Pen: Humphreys (3)	Report	Pen: O'Gara (5); Drop: O'Gara (2)
Ulster: 1. Justin Fitzpatrick, 2. Richard Weir, 3. Simon Best, 4. Gary Longwell, 5. Paddy Johns, 6. Russell Nelson, 7. Andy Ward, 8. Tony McWhirter, 9. Brad Free, 10. David Humphreys (c), 11. Tyrone Howe, 12. Jonathan Bell, 13. Ryan Constable, 14. James Topping, 15. Grant Henderson.

2 September 2000	Leinster	21-15	Connacht	Donnybrook Stadium
		Report

8 September 2000	Munster	26–20	Leinster	Musgrave Park
		Report

9 September 2000	Connacht	15-39	Ulster	Galway Sportsgrounds
	Try: Lee; Elwood; Con: Elwood; Pen: Elwood	Report	Try: Nelson; Johns; J. Bell; J. Topping; Stewart; Con: Humphreys (4); Pen: Humphreys (3)
Ulster: 1. Justin Fitzpatrick, 2. Richard Weir, 3. Simon Best, 4. Paddy Johns, 5. Gary Longwell, 6. Russell Nelson, 7. Andy Ward, 8. Tony McWhirter, 9. Brad Free, 10. David Humphreys (c), 11. Tyrone Howe, 12. Jonathan Bell, 13. Ryan Constable, 14. James Topping, 15. Grant Henderson. Replacements: Mark Blair (for Longwell, 60), Shane Stewart (for Henderson, 63), Stephen Bell (for Free, 71), Derek Topping (for Ward, 74)

15 September 2000	Leinster	19-6	Ulster	Donnybrook
	Try: Hickie; Con: McHugh; Pen: McHugh (2); Dempsey	Report	Pen: Humphreys (2)
Ulster: 1. Justin Fitzpatrick, 2. Richard Weir, 3. Simon Best, 4. Paddy Johns, 5. Gary Longwell, 6. Russell Nelson, 7. Andy Ward, 8. Tony McWhirter, 9. Brad Free, 10. David Humphreys (c), 11. Tyrone Howe, 12. Jonathan Bell, 13. Ryan Constable, 14. James Topping, 15. Grant Henderson. Replacements: Derek Topping (for McWhirter, 40), Shane Stewart (for Henderson, 67), Stephen Bell (for Free, 75).

15 September 2000	Munster (Ireland)	36–13	(Ireland) Connacht	Thomond Park
		Report

22 September 2000	Ulster	26-13	Leinster	Ravenhill
	Try: J. Bell; Ward; Con: Humphreys (2); Pen: Humphreys (4)	Report	Try: McHugh; Con: McHugh; Drop: O'Driscoll
Ulster: 1. Justin Fitzpatrick, 2. Richard Weir, 3. Simon Best, 4. Mark Blair, 5. Gary Longwell, 6. Russell Nelson, 7. Andy Ward, 8. Tony McWhirter, 9. Brad Free, 10. David Humphreys (c), 11. Tyrone Howe, 12. Jonathan Bell, 13. Ryan Constable, 14. James Topping, 15. Grant Henderson. Replacements: Derek Topping (for Nelson, 59), Stephen Bell (for Free, 63), Shane Stewart (for J. Topping, 77).

23 September 2000	Connacht	13–23	Munster	Galway Sportsgrounds
		Report

29 September 2000	Munster	29-21	Ulster	Thomond Park
	Try: Crotty; Horgan; Con: O'Gara (2); Pen: O'Gara (5)	Report	Try: Free; J. Topping; Con: Humphreys; Pen: Humphreys (3)
Ulster: 1. Justin Fitzpatrick, 2. Richard Weir, 3. Simon Best, 4. Paddy Johns, 5. Gary Longwell, 6. Russell Nelson, 7. Andy Ward, 8. Tony McWhirter, 9. Brad Free, 10. David Humphreys (c), 11. Shane Stewart, 12. Jonathan Bell, 13. Ryan Constable, 14. James Topping, 15. Grant Henderson. Replacements: Derek Topping (for McWhirter, 64), Mark Blair (for Johns, 71), Clem Boyd (for Best, 71), Stephen Bell (for Free, 76).

29 September 2000	Connacht	22-20	Leinster	Galway Sportsgrounds
		Report

3 November 2000	Ulster	36-22	Connacht	Ravenhill
	Try: J. Topping; Blair (2); Humphreys; Ward; Con: Humphreys (4); Pen: Humphreys	Report	Try: O'Connor; Munn; Schoemann; Con: Munn (2); Pen: Munn
Ulster: 1. Justin Fitzpatrick, 2. Richard Weir, 3. Clem Boyd, 4. Gary Longwell, 5. Mark Blair, 6. Russell Nelson, 7. Andy Ward, 8. Tony McWhirter, 9. Brad Free, 10. David Humphreys (c), 11. Sheldon Coulter, 12. Shane Stewart, 13. Ryan Constable, 14. James Topping, 15. Grant Henderson. Replacements: Simon Best (for Boyd, 32), Paddy Johns (for Longwell, 40), Paul Shields (for Weir, 50), Derek Topping (for McWhirter, 62), Neil Doak (for Free, 67).

3 November 2000	Leinster	16–16	Munster	Donnybrook
		Report

=== 2001–02 ===
The 2001–02 IRFU Interprovincial Championship was a transitional season before the competition was superseded by the Celtic League. Pool matches between Irish provinces in the 2001–02 Celtic League counted towards the championship. The remaining Interprovincial fixtures were originally scheduled to take place in December 2001, but were postponed because IRFU director of fitness Dr. Liam Hennessy felt that the schedule, between the Celtic League, the Heineken Cup and the Autumn internationals, was too onerous and players needed a period of rest and recovery to prepare for the Six Nations. They took place in April and May 2002.

Team	P	W	D	L	F	A	BP	Pts	Status
Leinster	3	2	0	1	86	35	2	12	Champions; qualified for 2002–03 Heineken Cup
Ulster	3	2	0	1	50	66	0	8	Qualified for 2002–03 Heineken Cup
Munster	3	1	1	1	64	48	1	7	Qualified for 2002–03 Heineken Cup
Connacht	3	0	0	3	56	107	1	1	Qualified 2002–03 European Challenge Cup

=== Celtic league Interprovincial matches ===
28 August 2001	Munster	40–19	Connacht	Thomond Park
19:35	Try: Staunton; O'Neill; Horan; Con: Staunton (2); Pen: Staunton (7)	Match Centre	Try: E. Reddan; Con: Elwood; Pen: Elwood (4)	Attendance: 6,000
‘’’Munster’’’: 1. Marcus Horan, 2. James Blaney, 3. John Hayes, 4. Mick Galwey, 5. Mick O'Driscoll, 6. Alan Quinlan, 7. David Wallace, 8. Anthony Foley, 9. Peter Stringer, 10. Jason Holland, 11. Anthony Horgan, 12. John Kelly, 13. Mike Mullins, 14. John O'Neill, 15. Jeremy Staunton.; Replacements: Ronan O’Gara, Frankie Sheahan, Paul O'Connell, Jim Williams. Unused: Peter Clohessy, Mike Prendergast, Killian Keane.				Attendance: 6,000
‘’’Connacht’’’: 1. Dan McFarland, 2. Marnus Uijs, 3. Peter Bracken, 4. Rowan Frost, 5. Mark McConnell, 6. Michael Swift, 7. Colm Rigney, 8. Des Dillon, 9. James Ferris, 10. Eric Elwood, 11. Oisin Grennan, 12. Tim Allnutt, 13. Darren Yapp, 14. Pat Duignan, 15. Gavin Duffy.; Replacements: Eoin Reddan, Johnny O'Connor. Unused: Ronan McCormack, Tom Kearns, Damian Browne, Paul Neville, Mark McHugh.

31 August 2001	Leinster	31 – 9	Ulster	Donnybrook
19:35	Try: O'Kelly; D'Arcy (2); Hickie; Con: Spooner; Pen: Spooner (2); Drop: Dempsey	Report; Match centre	Pen: Humphreys (2); Wallace	Referee: Nigel Williams
Leinster: 1. Reggie Corrigan, 2. Shane Byrne, 3. Emmet Byrne, 4. Leo Cullen, 5. Malcolm O'Kelly, 6. Eric Miller, 7. Keith Gleeson, 8. Victor Costello, 9. Brian O'Meara, 10. Nathan Spooner, 11. Gordon D'Arcy, 12. Shane Horgan, 13. Brian O'Driscoll, 14. Denis Hickie, 15. Girvan Dempsey.; Replacements: Adam Magro (for Darcy 77), Trevor Brennan (for Miller 77); Unused: Gavin Hickie, Peter Coyle, Liam Toland, Ben Willis, Andrew Dunne.				Referee: Nigel Williams
Ulster: 1. Justin Fitzpatrick, 2. Paul Shields, 3. Simon Best, 4. Paddy Johns, 5. Jeremy Davidson, 6. Andy Ward (c), 7. Russell Nelson, 8. Neil McMillan, 9. Neil Doak, 10. David Humphreys, 11. Tyrone Howe, 12. Adam Larkin, 13. Jonathan Bell, 14. Sheldon Coulter, 15. Paddy Wallace.; Replacements: Mark Blair (for Johns, 44), Ryan Constable (for Bell, 56), Clem Boyd (for Best, 71), Tony McWhirter (for Ward, 71), Niall Malone (for Humphreys, 72), Kieran Campbell (for Doak, 78).

=== Additional matches ===
19 April 2002	Munster	6–6	Leinster	Musgrave Park
	Pen: O'Gara; Holland	Report	Pen: Spooner (2)

22 April 2002	Connacht	17-18	Ulster	Galway Sportsgrounds
	Try: Uijs; Pen: McHugh (4)	Report	Try: Constable; B. Cunningham; Con: Wallace; Pen: Wallace (2)	Referee: D. McHugh
Ulster lineup: 1. Justin Fitzpatrick, 2. Nigel Brady, 3. Simon Best, 4. Paddy Johns, 5. Aidan McKearney, 6. Tony McWhirter, 7. Andy Ward (c), 8. Warren Brosnihan, 9. Neil Doak, 10. Paddy Wallace, 11. Tyrone Howe, 12. Adam Larkin, 13. Ryan Constable, 14. James Topping, 15. Bryn Cunningham.; Replacements: Sheldon Coulter (for Topping, 59), Matt McCullough (for McKearney, 59), Bryan Young (for McCullough, 78).				Referee: D. McHugh

8 May 2002	Connacht	20-49	Leinster	Galway Sportsgrounds
	Try: Keane; McHugh; Con: Elwood (2); Pen: Elwood (2)	Report	Try: Corrigan; Keogh; McKenna; O'Driscoll (2); McCullen; Con: O'Meara (5); Pen: O'Meara (3)

12 May 2002	Ulster	23-18	Munster	Ravenhill
	Try: Wallace; Doak; Con: Wallace (2); Pen: Wallace (2); Drop: Wallace	Report	Try: O'Connell; Stringer; Con: O'Gara; Pen: O'Gara (2)	Referee: Alan Lewis
Ulster lineup: 1. Justin Fitzpatrick, 2. Matt Sexton, 3. Simon Best, 4. Paddy Johns, 5. Gary Longwell, 6. Warren Brosnihan, 7. Andy Ward (c), 8. Tony McWhirter, 9. Neil Doak, 10. Paddy Wallace, 11. Tyrone Howe, 12. Stan McDowell, 13. Ryan Constable, 14. Sheldon Coulter, 15. Bryn Cunningham.; Replacements: Russell Nelson (for Brosnihan, 69), Bryan Young (for Fitzpatrick, 79).				Referee: Alan Lewis

== See also ==
- 1872 Cup — Scottish club rivalry
