= 1996–97 Munster Rugby season =

- Ground(s): Thomond Park (Capacity: 13,200); Musgrave Park (Capacity: 8,300)
- Coach: Jerry Holland
- Captain: Mick Galwey

The 1996–97 Munster Rugby season was Munster's second season as a professional team, during which they competed in the IRFU Interprovincial Championship and Heineken Cup.

== 1996–97 squad ==
Note: Flags indicate national union under World Rugby eligibility rules. Players may hold more than one non-World Rugby nationality.

Player	Position	Union
Paul Cunningham	Hooker	Ireland
Terry Kingston	Hooker	Ireland
Frankie Sheahan	Hooker	Ireland
Peter Clohessy	Prop	Ireland
John Fitzgerald	Prop	Ireland
Noel Healy	Prop	Ireland
James Hickey	Prop	Ireland
Paul McCarthy	Prop	Ireland
Ian Murray	Prop	Ireland
Len Dineen	Lock	Ireland
Mick Galwey (c)	Lock	Ireland
Gabriel Fulcher	Lock	Ireland
Michael Coughlin	Lock	Ireland
David Corkery	Back row	Ireland
Ben Cronin	Back row	Ireland
Declan Edwards	Back row	Ireland
Anthony Foley	Back row	Ireland
Eddie Halvey	Back row	Ireland
Ultan O'Callaghan	Back row	Ireland
Alan Quinlan	Back row	Ireland
Liam Toland	Back row	Ireland

Player	Position	Union
Stephen McIvor	Scrum-half	Ireland
David O'Mahony	Scrum-half	Ireland
Brian O'Meara	Scrum-half	Ireland
Aidan O'Halloran	Fly-half	Ireland
Killian Keane	Centre	Ireland
Sean McCahill	Centre	Ireland
Mike Lynch	Centre	Ireland
Brian Walsh	Centre	Ireland
Brian Begley	Wing	Ireland
John Lacey	Wing	Ireland
Andrew Thompson	Wing	Ireland
Richard Wallace	Wing	Ireland
Dominic Crotty	Fullback	Ireland
Pat Murray	Fullback	Ireland

== 1996–97 IRFU Interprovincial Championship ==
Team	P	W	D	L	F	A	BP	Pts	Status
Munster	3	3	0	0	117	92	-	12	Champions; qualified for next season's Heineken Cup
Leinster	3	1	0	2	88	92	-	4	Qualified for next season's Heineken Cup
Ulster	3	1	0	2	81	89	-	4	Qualified for next season's Heineken Cup
Connacht	3	1	0	2	77	90	-	4	

21 September 1996	Munster (Ireland)	45–28	(Ireland) Connacht	Temple Hill
	Try: Lacey (2); Foley; McCahill; Walsh; Con: O'Halloran (4); Pen: O'Halloran (3); Drop: O'Halloran	Report	Try: A. Reddan; Devine (2); Con: Elwood (2); Pen: Elwood (3)	Referee: A. Watson
Munster lineup: 1. Ian Murray, 2. Paul Cunningham, 3. Noel Healy, 4. Len Dineen, 5. Mick Galwey, 6. Anthony Foley, 7. Ben Cronin, 8. Eddie Halvey, 9. Stephen McIvor, 10. Aidan O'Halloran, 11. Andrew Thompson, 12. Michael Lynch, 13. Brian Walsh, 14. John Lacey, 15. Sean McCahill.; Replacements: Pat Murray (for Lacey, for McCahill).				Referee: A. Watson

28 September 1996	Leinster (Ireland)	40–45	(Ireland) Munster	Donnybrook
	Try: Coleman; Ridge; McQuilkin; Francis; Hickie; Con: Governey (3); Pen: Governey (3)	Report	Try: Galwey (2); Halvey; Con: Begley; Lynch (2); Pen: Begley (8); Lynch (2); Drop: Keane	Referee: Graham Hughes
Munster lineup: 1. Ian Murray, 2. Terry Kingston, 3. Noel Healy, 4. Len Dineen, 5. Mick Galwey, 6. Anthony Foley, 7. Ben Cronin, 8. Eddie Halvey, 9. Stephen McIvor, 10. Killian Keane, 11. Brian Begley, 12. Brian Walsh, 13. Mike Lynch, 14. Sean McCahill, 15. Dominic Crotty.; Replacements: Andrew Thompson.				Referee: Graham Hughes

5 October 1996	Munster (Ireland)	27–24	(Ireland) Ulster	Thomond Park
	Try: Dineen, Galwey; Con: Begley; Pen: Begley (3); Drop: McIvor, Keene	Report	Try: Duncan; Coulter; Con: Laing; Pen: Laing (4)	Referee: A. Lewis
Munster lineup: 1. Ian Murray, 2. Terry Kingston, 3. Noel Healy, 4. Len Dineen, 5. Mick Galwey, 6. Anthony Foley, 7. Ben Cronin, 8. Eddie Halvey, 9. Stephen McIvor, 10. Killian Keane, 11. Brian Begley, 12. Mike Lynch, 13. Brian Walsh, 14. Sean McCahill, 15. Dominic Crotty.; Replacements: Paul McCarthy (for Healy 69').				Referee: A. Lewis

== 1996–97 Heineken Cup ==
=== Pool 4 ===
Team	P	W	D	L	Tries for	Tries against	Try diff	Points for	Points against	Points diff	Pts
(France) Toulouse	4	3	0	1	21	13	8	157	142	15	6
(Wales) Cardiff	4	3	0	1	16	7	9	135	97	38	6
(England) London Wasps	4	2	0	2	17	14	3	156	115	41	4
(Ireland) Munster	4	2	0	2	11	22	–11	109	135	–26	4
(Italy) Milan	4	0	0	4	6	15	–9	73	141	–68	0

12 October 1996	Munster (Ireland)	23–5	(Italy) Milan	Musgrave Park
15:00		Report		Attendance: 1,500; Referee: David Davies
Munster lineup: 1. John Fitzgerald, 2. Terry Kingston, 3. Paul McCarthy, 4. Gabriel Fulcher, 5. Mick Galwey, 6. Anthony Foley, 7. Ben Cronin, 8. Liam Toland, 9. Stephen McIvor, 10. Killian Keane, 11. Brian Begley, 12. Sean McCahill, 13. Brian Walsh, 14. Richard Wallace, 15. Dominic Crotty.; Replacements: Pat Murray (for Crotty 42'), Brian O'Meara (for McIvor 70').				Attendance: 1,500; Referee: David Davies

16 October 1996	Cardiff (Wales)	43–18	(Ireland) Munster	Cardiff Arms Park
19:15		Report		Attendance: 4,000; Referee: John Bacigalupo
Munster lineup: 1. Ian Murray, 2. Terry Kingston, 3. Paul McCarthy, 4. Mick Galwey, 5. Gabriel Fulcher, 6. Anthony Foley, 7. Ben Cronin, 8. Liam Toland, 9. Stephen McIvor, 10. Killian Keane, 11. Brian Begley, 12. Brian Walsh, 13. Sean McCahill, 14. Richard Wallace, 15. Dominic Crotty.; Replacements: Len Dineen (for Foley 47'), Pat Murray (for Begley 70').				Attendance: 4,000; Referee: John Bacigalupo

19 October 1996	Munster (Ireland)	49–22	(England) London Wasps	Thomond Park
15:00		Report		Attendance: 6,000; Referee: Didier Mene
Munster lineup: 1. John Fitzgerald, 2. Terry Kingston, 3. Noel Healy, 4. Gabriel Fulcher, 5. Mick Galwey, 6. David Corkery, 7. Anthony Foley, 8. Ben Cronin, 9. Stephen McIvor, 10. Killian Keane, 11. Dominic Crotty, 12. Sean McCahill, 13. Brian Walsh, 14. Richard Wallace, 15. Pat Murray.				Attendance: 6,000; Referee: Didier Mene

2 November 1996	Toulouse (France)	60–19	(Ireland) Munster	Les Sept Deniers
19:00		Report		Attendance: 14,000; Referee: Tony Spreadbury
Munster lineup: 1. John Fitzgerald, 2. Terry Kingston, 3. Noel Healy, 4. Mick Galwey, 5. Gabriel Fulcher, 6. Anthony Foley, 7. David Corkery, 8. Ben Cronin, 9. Stephen McIvor, 10. Killian Keane, 11. Dominic Crotty, 12. Sean McCahill, 13. Brian Walsh, 14. Richard Wallace, 15. Pat Murray.; Replacements: Paul McCarthy (for Healy 8'), Len Dineen (for Cronin 68'), Ian Murray (for McCarthy 68').				Attendance: 14,000; Referee: Tony Spreadbury

== Friendlies ==
9 November 1996	Munster (Ireland)	25–35	Samoa XV	Musgrave Park
		Report		Referee: Chris White
Munster lineup: 1.Paul McCarthy, 2. Frank Sheehan, 3. Ian Murray, 4. Len Dineen, 5. Dara Kirby, 6. Alan Quinlan, 7. Ultan O'Callaghan, 8. Liam Toland, 9. David O'Mahony, 10. Aidan O'Halloran, 11. Brian Begley, 12. Sean McCahill, 13. Mike Lynch, 14. Andrew Thompson, 15. Pat Murray (c).; Replacements: James Hickey (for McCarthy 50'), John Fitzgerald (for Murray 54'), Declan Edwards (for O'Callaghan).				Referee: Chris White

26 November 1996	Munster (Ireland)	19–55	Australia XV	Thomond Park
		Report		Referee: Robert Davies
Munster lineup: 1. John Fitzgerald, 2. Terry Kingston, 3. Noel Healy, 4. Mick Galwey, 5. Dara Kirby, 6. Anthony Foley, 7. Ben Cronin, 8. David Corkery, 9. Stephen McIvor, 10. Killian Keane, 11. Dominic Crotty, 12. Sean McCahill, 13. Brian Walsh, 14. Richard Wallace, 15. Pat Murray.; Replacements: Peter Clohessy (for Healy 40'), Len Dineen (for Kirby 40'), Mike Lynch (for Walsh 65).				Referee: Robert Davies
