= 1995–96 Munster Rugby season =

- Ground(s): Thomond Park (Capacity: 13,200); Musgrave Park (Capacity: 8,300)
- Coach: Jerry Holland
- Captain: Pat Murray

The 1995–96 season was Munster Rugby's first season under professionalism. Jerry Holland was head coach. They finished third in the IRFU Interprovincial Championship, winning two and losing two, and second in their pool in the inaugural Heineken Cup, winning one and losing one.

== Background ==
On 26 August, rugby union was declared open to professionalism. At this stage the Irish provinces were still representative teams, not professional clubs. Many involved in the game were concerned that domestic clubs could not afford to pay players, who could be lost to professional teams in England. In September, the IRFU confirmed that, for this season, only senior international players would be paid, with a one-year moratorium on payment for club and provincial players. Up to 35 Ireland players would be offered £26,000 contracts for the 1996 Five Nations Championship. As the situation developed, match fees became available for Heineken Cup and Interprovincial matches, with players who appeared in all six matches in line to receive almost £3,000.

The inaugural Heineken Cup was launched in the summer of 1995 on the initiative of the Five Nations Committee to provide a new level of cross border competition. Twelve sides representing Ireland, Wales, Italy, Romania and France competed in four pools of three with the group winners going directly into the semi-finals. English and Scottish teams did not take part in the inaugural competition. The IRFU confirmed that Ireland would enter provincial teams, as their clubs were unlikely to be strong enough for the competition. They were initially offered two places, but Tom Kiernan, Ireland's representative on the organising committee, was able to secure a third. The three places would go to the top three teams in the 1994 IRFU Interprovincial Championship, Munster, Ulster and Leinster.

== 1995–96 squad ==
Note: Flags indicate national union under World Rugby eligibility rules. Players may hold more than one non-World Rugby nationality.

Player	Position	Union
Paul Cunningham	Hooker	Ireland
Terry Kingston	Hooker	Ireland
Conor Twomey	Hooker	Ireland
Des Clohessy	Prop	Ireland
Peter Clohessy	Prop	Ireland
John Fitzgerald	Prop	Ireland
Michael Fitzgerald	Prop	Ireland
Paul McCarthy	Prop	Ireland
Paul Spain	Prop	Ireland
Gabriel Fulcher	Lock	Ireland
Mick Galwey	Lock	Ireland
Michael Coughlan	Lock	Ireland
David Corkery	Back row	Ireland
Anthony Foley	Back row	Ireland
Eddie Halvey	Back row	Ireland
Ultan O'Callaghan	Back row	Ireland
Brian Toland	Back row	Ireland
Liam Toland	Back row	Ireland

Player	Position	Union
Fergus Aherne	Scrum-half	Ireland
Michael Bradley	Scrum-half	Ireland
Stephen McIvor	Scrum-half	Ireland
David O'Mahony	Scrum-half	Ireland
Paul Burke	Fly-half	Ireland
Stephen Tuohy	Fly-half	Ireland
Sean McCahill	Centre	Ireland
Dan Larkin	Centre	Ireland
Brian Walsh	Centre	Ireland
John Lacey	Wing	Ireland
Kenny Smith	Wing	Ireland
Richard Wallace	Wing	Ireland
Dominic Crotty	Fullback	Ireland
Pat Murray (c)	Fullback	Ireland

== 1995–96 Heineken Cup ==
=== Pool 4 ===
Team	P	W	D	L	Tries for	Tries against	Try diff	Points for	Points against	Points diff	Pts	Status
(Wales) Swansea	2	1	0	1	3	3	0	35	27	8	2	Advanced to the semi-finals
(Ireland) Munster	2	1	0	1	2	2	0	29	32	−3	2	Eliminated
(France) Castres	2	1	0	1	2	2	0	29	34	−5	2	Eliminated

1 November 1995	Munster (Ireland)	17–13	(Wales) Swansea	Thomond Park
15:00	Try: Wallace, Murray; Con: Smith (2); Pen: Smith	Report	Try: Harris; Con: Smith; Pen: Smith (2)	Attendance: 6,000; Referee: Ed Morrison
Munster lineup: 1. John Fitzgerald, 2. Terry Kingston, 3. Peter Clohessy, 4. Mick Galwey, 5. Gabriel Fulcher, 6. Eddie Halvey, 7. Anthony Foley, 8. David Corkery, 9. David O'Mahony, 10. Paul Burke, 11. Kenny Smith, 12. Dan Larkin, 13. Sean McCahill, 14. Richard Wallace, 15. Pat Murray.; Replacements: Michael Fitzgerald (for J. Fitzgerald), Brian Toland (for Halvey).				Attendance: 6,000; Referee: Ed Morrison

8 November 1995	Castres (France)	19–12	(Ireland) Munster	Stade Antoine Beguere
20:00	Try: Combes; Con: Labit; Pen: Labit (4)	Report	Pen: Smith (4)	Attendance: 6,500
Munster lineup: 1. John Fitzgerald, 2. Terry Kingston, 3. Peter Clohessy, 4. Paul O'Connor, 5. Gabriel Fulcher, 6. Mick Galwey, 7. Anthony Foley, 8. David Corkery, 9. David O'Mahony, 10. Paul Burke, 11. Kenny Smith, 12. Dan Larkin, 13. Sean McCahill, 14. Richard Wallace, 15. Pat Murray.; Replacements: Brian Walsh (for Burke 57'), Brian Toland (for Corkery 22', for Galwey 52')				Attendance: 6,500

== 1995–96 IRFU Interprovincial Championship ==
Team	P	W	D	L	F	A	Pts	Status
Leinster	4	4	0	0	133	53	16	Champions; qualified for next season's Heineken Cup
Ulster	4	3	0	1	73	53	12	Qualified for next season's Heineken Cup
Munster	4	2	0	2	91	58	8	Qualified for next season's Heineken Cup
Exiles	4	1	0	3	71	113	4	
Connacht	4	0	0	4	51	142	0	

25 November 1995	Ulster	14–10	Munster	Ravenhill
	Try: Mackey; Pen: McCall (3)	Report	Try: Walsh; Con: Smith; Pen: Smith	Referee: A. Lewis
Munster: 1. John Fitzgerald, 2. Paul Cunningham, 3. Peter Clohessy, 4. Gabriel Fulcher, 5. Paul O'Connor, 6. Mick Galwey, 7. Anthony Foley, 8. David Corkery, 9. David O'Mahony, 10. Paul Burke, 11. Kenny Smith, 12. Sean McCahill, 13. Brian Walsh, 14. Richard Wallace, 15. Pat Murray (c).				Referee: A. Lewis

2 December 1995	Munster	20–14	(Ireland) Irish Exiles	Musgrave Park, Cork
	Try: L. Toland (2); Con: Burke (2); Pen: Burke; Drop: Tuohy	Report	Try: Henderson; Malone; Con: Corcoran (2)	Referee: B. Stirling
Munster: 1. Paul Spain, 2. Paul Cunningham, 3. Peter Clohessy, 4. Gabriel Fulcher, 5. Mick Galwey, 6. David Corkery, 7. Brian Toland, 8. Liam Toland, 9. Stephen McIvor, 10. Paul Burke, 11. John Lacey, 12. Pat Murray (c), 13. Brian Walsh, 14. Richard Wallace, 15. Sean McCahill.; Replacements: Dominic Crotty (for Lacey, 77), Stephen Tuohy (for Burke, 80).				Referee: B. Stirling

16 December 1995	Munster	15–19	Leinster	Thomond Park
	Try: R. Wallace (2); Con: Murray; Pen: Murray	Report	Try: Rolland; Con: McGowan; Pen: McGowan (4)	Referee: A. Watson
Munster: 1. Paul McCarthy, 2. Paul Cunningham, 3. Peter Clohessy, 4. Gabriel Fulcher, 5. Mick Galwey, 6. David Corkery, 7. Brian Toland, 8. Liam Toland, 9. Stephen McIvor, 10. Paul Burke, 11. Dominic Crotty, 12. Sean McCahill, 13. Brian Walsh, 14. Richard Wallace, 15. Pat Murray (c).				Referee: A. Watson

23 December 1995	Connacht	11–46	Munster	Galway Sportsgrounds
	Try: Heaslip; Pen: Elwood (2)	Report	Try: McIvor; P. Clohessy; Crotty; D. Clohessy; Walsh; L. Toland; Con: Smith (5); Pen: Smith (2)	Referee: A. Lewis
Munster: 1. Paul Spain, 2. Paul Cunningham, 3. Peter Clohessy, 4. Gabriel Fulcher, 5. Mick Galwey, 6. Des Clohessy, 7. Brian Toland, 8. Liam Toland, 9. Stephen McIvor, 10. Paul Burke, 11. Kenny Smith, 12. Sean McCahill, 13. Brian Walsh, 14. Richard Wallace, 15. Dominic Crotty.; Replacements: Fergus Aherne (for McIvor, 61), Conor Twomey (for Cunningham, 62), Stephen Tuohy (for Burke, 68).				Referee: A. Lewis
