= 1996–97 Leinster Rugby season =

- Ground(s): Donnybrook, Dublin
- Coach(es): Jim Glennon; Ciaran Callan; Paul Dean
- Captain: Chris Pim
- League(s): Heineken Cup (3rd in pool); IRFU Interprovincial Championship (2nd of 4)

The 1996-97 season was Leinster's second season under professionalism. Ciaran Callan was officially head coach, but team manager Jim Glennon was in overall charge, with Callan coaching the forwards and Paul Dean coaching the backs. Chris Pim was captain. They finished third in their pool in the Heineken Cup, and second in the IRFU Interprovincial Championship.

At this stage the Irish provinces were still representative teams, not professional clubs. However, the provinces were now offering contracts and match fees for Heineken Cup and Interprovincial matches, although these contracts sometimes conflicted with players contracted to clubs in England.

== Players selected ==
Leinster Rugby squad
**Props**: (Ireland) Paul Flavin (Blackrock); (Ireland) **Henry Hurley** (Moseley); (Ireland) Angus McKeen (Lansdowne); (Ireland) **Paul Wallace** (Saracens); **Hookers**: (Ireland) James Blaney (Terenure); (Ireland) Shane Byrne (Blackrock); (Ireland) Mark McDermott (Lansdowne); **Locks**: (Ireland) Greg Duffy (Old Wesley); (Ireland) **Neil Francis** (Old Belvedere); (Ireland) Steve Jameson (St Mary's College); (Ireland) Malcolm O'Kelly (London Irish)	**Back row**: (Ireland) **Victor Costello** (London Irish); (Ireland) **Kelvin Leahy** (Wanderers); (New Zealand) Dean Oswald (Blackrock); (Ireland) Chris Pim (Old Wesley) (c); (Ireland) Stephen Rooney (Landsowne); (Ireland) Kevin Spicer (Oxford); **Scrum-halves**: (Ireland) **Niall Hogan** (Oxford/Terenure); (Ireland) **Alain Rolland** (Blackrock); **Fly-halves**: (Ireland) Richard Governey (Landsdowne); (Ireland) **Alan McGowan** (Blackrock)	**Centres**: (Ireland) **Vince Cunningham** (St Mary's); (Ireland) Ray McIlreavy (St Mary's); (Ireland) **Kurt McQuilkin** (Lansdowne); (Ireland) Martin Ridge (Old Belvedere); **Wings**: (Ireland) Paddy Gavin (Old Belvedere); (Ireland) **Darragh O'Mahony** (Lansdowne); (Ireland) Denis Hickie (St Mary's College); (Ireland) David Coleman (Terenure); (Ireland) Girvan Dempsey (Terenure); **Fullbacks**: (Ireland) Peter McKenna (Old Belvedere); (Ireland) **Ciaran Clarke** (Terenure)
(c) denotes the team captain, **Bold** denotes internationally capped players.^{*} denotes players qualified to play for Ireland on residency or dual nationality.

== Heineken Cup ==
Team	P	W	D	L	Tries for	Tries against	Try diff	Points for	Points against	Points diff	Pts
(England) Leicester	4	4	0	0	14	3	11	114	43	71	8
(Wales) Llanelli	4	2	0	2	9	9	0	97	81	16	4
(Ireland) Leinster	4	2	0	2	9	12	−3	86	109	−23	4
(France) Pau	4	1	0	3	19	10	9	137	103	34	2
(Scotland) Scottish Borders	4	1	0	3	7	24	−17	80	178	−98	2

12 October 1996; 14:30	Llanelli (Wales)	34–17	(Ireland) Leinster	Stradey Park
	Try: Wyatt; Moon; Boobyer; Con: Botica (2); Pen: Botica (5)	Report	Try: Gavin; McKenna; O'Mahony; Con: Governey	Attendance: 2,800
Leinster lineup: 1. Henry Hurley, 2. Mark McDermott, 3. Paul Wallace, 4. Neil Francis, 5. Malcolm O'Kelly, 6. Chris Pim, 7. Stephen Rooney, 8. Victor Costello, 9. Alain Rolland, 10. Richard Governey, 11. Darragh O'Mahony, 12. Kurt McQuilkin, 13. Ray McIlreavy, 14. Paddy Gavin.; 15. Peter McKenna.; Replacement: Niall Hogan.				Attendance: 2,800

16 October 1996; 18:45	Leinster (Ireland)	10–27	(England) Leicester Tigers	Lansdowne Road
	Try: Penalty try Con: McGowan; Pen: McGowan	Report	Try: Rowntree; Kardooni; Wells; Con: Liley (3); Pen: Liley (2)	Attendance: 3,500
Leinster lineup: 1. Henry Hurley, 2. Mark McDermott, 3. Paul Wallace, 4. Neil Francis, 5. Malcolm O'Kelly, 6. Chris Pim, 7. Victor Costello, 8. Stephen Rooney, 9. Alain Rolland, 10. Alan McGowan, 11. Darragh O'Mahony, 12. Martin Ridge, 13. Kurt McQuilkin, 14. Patrick Gavin.; 15. Peter McKenna.; Replacement: Ciaran Clarke, Richard Governey.				Attendance: 3,500

26 October 1996; 14:30	Borders (Scotland)	25–34	(Ireland) Leinster	The Greenyards
	Try: Aitken; Changleng; Parker; Con: Parker (2); Pen: Parker (2)	Report	Try: Oswald; Clarke; McGowan; Hickie; Con: McGowan; Pen: McGowan (4)	Attendance: 3,500
Leinster lineup: 1. Henry Hurley, 2. Mark McDermott, 3. Angus McKeen, 4. Neil Francis, 5. Malcolm O'Kelly, 6. Chris Pim, 7. Dean Oswald, 8. Victor Costello, 9. Niall Hogan, 10. Alan McGowan, 11. Darragh O'Mahony, 12. Kurt McQuilkin, 13. Martin Ridge, 14. Denis Hickie.; 15. Ciaran Clarke.; Replacements: Girvan Dempsey, Stephen Rooney.				Attendance: 3,500

2 November 1996; 14:30	Leinster (Ireland)	25–23	(France) Pau	Donnybrook
	Try: McQuilkin; Con: McGowan; Pen: McGowan (6)	Report	Try: Claverie; Paille; Aucagne; Con: Aucagne	Attendance: 4,000
Leinster lineup: 1. Henry Hurley, 2. Mark McDermott, 3. Paul Wallace, 4. Malcolm O'Kelly, 5. Neil Francis, 6. Chris Pim, 7. Victor Costello, 8. Dean Oswald, 9. Niall Hogan, 10. Alan McGowan, 11. Darragh O'Mahony, 12. Kurt McQuilkin, 13. Martin Ridge, 14. Denis Hickie.; 15. Ciaran Clarke.; Replacements: James Blaney, Stephen Rooney.				Attendance: 4,000

== IRFU Interprovincial Championship ==
Team	P	W	D	L	F	A	BP	Pts	Status
Munster	3	3	0	0	117	92	-	6	Champions; qualified for 1997–98 Heineken Cup
Leinster	3	1	0	2	88	92	-	2	Qualified for 1997–98 Heineken Cup
Ulster	3	1	0	2	81	89	-	2	Qualified for 1997–98 Heineken Cup
Connacht	3	1	0	2	77	90	-	2	Qualified for 1997–98 European Challenge Cup

21 September 1996	Ulster	25-35	Leinster	Ravenhill
	Try: Ritchie; Duncan; Topping; Con: Laing (2); Pen: Laing (2)	Preview; Report	Try: McKenna (2); Jameson; Spicer; Con: Governey (3); Pen: Governey (3)	Referee: L. Mayne
Leinster lieup: 1. Henry Hurley, 2. Mark McDermott, 3. Angus McKeen (Lansdowne), 4. Steve Jameson, 5. Greg Duffy, 6. Chris Pim (c), 7. Dean Oswald, 8. Kevin Spicer, 9. Niall Hogan, 10. Richard Governey, 11. Denis Hickie (St. Mary's), 12. Kurt McQuilkin (Lansdowne), 13. Martin Ridge (Old Belvedere), 14. David Coleman (Terenure), 15. Peter McKenna (Old Belvedere).				Referee: L. Mayne

28 September 1996	Leinster	40–45	Munster	Donnybrook
	Try: Coleman; Ridge; McQuilkin; Francis; Hickie; Con: Governey (3); Pen: Governey (3)	Report	Try: Galwey (2); Halvey; Con: Begley; Lynch (2); Pen: Begley (8); Lynch (2); Drop: Keane	Referee: Graham Hughes
Leinster lineup: 1. Henry Hurley, 2. Mark McDermott, 3. Angus McKeen, 4. Steve Jameson, 5. Neil Francis, 6. Chris Pim (c), 7. Stephen Rooney, 8. Kevin Spicer, 9. Alain Rolland, 10. Richard Governey, 11. Denis Hickie, 12. Kurt McQuilkin, 13. Martin Ridge, 14. David Coleman, 15. Peter McKenna.; Replacements: Girvan Dempsey (for Coleman), Paul Flavin (for McKeen).				Referee: Graham Hughes

5 October 1996	Connacht	22-13	Leinster	Galway Sportsgrounds
	Try: Leahy; Elwood; Pen: Elwood (3)	Report	Try: Francis; Con: Governey; Pen: Governey (2)
Leinster lineup: 1. Paul Flavin, 2. Mark McDermott, 3. Angus McKeen, 4. Steve Jameson, 5. Neil Francis, 6. Kelvin Leahy, 7. Kevin Spicer, 8. Stephen Rooney, 9. Alain Rolland (c), 10. Richard Governey, 11. Darragh O'Mahony, 12. Kurt McQuilkin, 13. Martin Ridge, 14. Paddy Gavin, 15. Peter McKenna.; Replacements: Shane Byrne (for McDermott 30'), Vince Cunningham (for Ridge 35'), Greg Duffy (for Francis 38').
