= 1995–96 Connacht Rugby season =

- Ground(s): The Sportsground, Galway
- Coach: Eddie O'Sullivan
- Captain: Kevin Devlin
- Top scorer: Eric Elwood (92)
- Most tries: Noel Mannion (2)
- League: IRFU Interprovincial Championship (5th of 5)

The 1995–96 season was Connacht's first season under professionalism. Eddie O'Sullivan was head coach, assisted by Mick Cosgrave, and Kevin Devlin was captain. They competed in the IRFU Interprovincial Championship, finishing bottom with four defeats out of four, and hosted Fiji and South African provincial side Griqualand West, winning both matches.

== Background ==
On 26 August, rugby union was declared open to professionalism. At this stage the Irish provinces were still representative teams, not professional clubs. Many involved in the game were concerned that domestic clubs could not afford to pay players, who could be lost to professional teams in England. In September, the IRFU confirmed that, for this season, only senior international players would be paid, with a one-year moratorium on payment for club and provincial players. Up to 35 Ireland players would be offered £26,000 contracts for the 1996 Five Nations Championship. That squad included Connacht player Eric Elwood. As the situation developed, match fees became available for Interprovincial matches.

== Players selected ==
Connacht Rugby squad
| **Props**: (Ireland) Davie Henshaw (Buccaneers); (Ireland) Declan Kavanagh (Blackrock); (Ireland) John Maher (Buccaneers); (Ireland) Ciaran Shanley (DLSP); **Hookers**: (Ireland) Billy Mulcahy (Skerries); (Ireland) Kevin Tierney (Galwegians); **Locks**: (Ireland) Graham Heaslip (Galwegians); (Ireland) Robert McCarthy (Sunday's Well); (Ireland) J. O'Callaghan (Wanderers); (South Africa) Chas O'Riordan* (Blackrock) | **Back row**: (Ireland) Neil Culliton (Wanderers); (Ireland) Kevin Devlin (St. Marys) (c); (Ireland) **Noel Mannion** (Buccaneers); (Ireland) Rory Rogers (Blackrock); (Ireland) P. Tarpey (Bective Rangers); **Scrum-halves**: (Ireland) Kenny Lawless (Clontarf); (Ireland) Diarmuid Reddan (Old Crescent); **Fly-halves**: (Ireland) **Eric Elwood** (Lansdowne) | **Centres**: (Ireland) Brian Carey (UCD); (Ireland) R. Corrigan (Lansdowne); (Ireland) Mervyn Murphy (Galwegians); **Wings**: (Ireland) Nigel Carolan (Galwegians); (Ireland) Michael Devine (Buccaneers); (Ireland) Marcus O'Reilly (Old Belvedere); **Fullbacks**: (Ireland) Peter Boland (Young Munster); (Ireland) Aidan White (Corinthans) |
(c) denotes the team captain, **Bold** denotes internationally capped players.^{*} denotes players qualified to play for Ireland on residency or dual nationality.

== IRFU Interprovincial Championship ==
| Team | P | W | D | L | F | A | Pts | Status |
|---|---|---|---|---|---|---|---|---|
| Leinster | 4 | 4 | 0 | 0 | 133 | 53 | 16 | Champions; qualified for next season's Heineken Cup |
| Ulster | 4 | 3 | 0 | 1 | 73 | 53 | 12 | Qualified for next season's Heineken Cup |
| Munster | 4 | 2 | 0 | 2 | 91 | 58 | 8 | Qualified for next season's Heineken Cup |
| Exiles | 4 | 1 | 0 | 3 | 71 | 113 | 4 | |
| Connacht | 4 | 0 | 0 | 4 | 51 | 142 | 0 | |

| 25 November 1995 | Irish Exiles (Ireland) | 28–22 | Connacht | The Avenue |
| | Try: Henderson; Staples (2); Halpin; Con: Corcoran; Pen: Corcoran (2) | Report | Try: Mannion; Con: Elwood; Pen: Elwood (4) | Referee: L. Mayne |
| Connacht lineup: 1. Declan Kavanagh, 2. Billy Mulcahy, 3. Ciaran Shanley, 4. Graham Heaslip, 5. J. O'Callaghan, 6. Rory Rogers, 7. Kevin Devlin (c), 8. Noel Mannion, 9. Diarmuid Reddan, 10. Eric Elwood, 11. Marcus O'Reilly, 12. Brian Carey, 13. R. Corrigan, 14. Michael Devine, 15. Aidan White. | | | | Referee: L. Mayne |

| 2 December 1995 | Connacht | 9–27 | Ulster | Galway Sportsgrounds |
| | Pen: Elwood (3) | Report | Try: Topping; Field; Con: McCall; Pen: McCall (5) | Referee: D. McHugh |
| Connacht lineup: 1. Declan Kavanagh, 2. Billy Mulcahy, 3. Ciaran Shanley, 4. Graham Heaslip, 5. J. O'Callaghan, 6. Rory Rogers, 7. Kevin Devlin (c), 8. Noel Mannion, 9. Diarmuid Reddan, 10. Eric Elwood, 11. Marcus O'Reilly, 12. Brian Carey, 13. R. Corrigan, 14. Michael Devine, 15. Peter Boland. | | | | Referee: D. McHugh |

| 2 December 1995 | Leinster | 41–9 | Connacht | Donnybrook Stadium |
| | Try: O'Shea (2); Hogan; Gavin; McGowan; Con: McGowan (2); Pen: McGowan (3); O'Shea | Report | Pen: Elwood (3) | Referee: B. Smith |
| Connacht lineup: 1. Declan Kavanagh, 2. Billy Mulcahy, 3. Ciaran Shanley, 4. Graham Heaslip, 5. J. O'Callaghan, 6. Rory Rogers, 7. Kevin Devlin (c), 8. Noel Mannion, 9. Diarmuid Reddan, 10. Eric Elwood, 11. Marcus O'Reilly, 12. Brian Carey, 13. R. Corrigan, 14. Michael Devine, 15. Peter Boland.; Replacements: Mervyn Murphy (for Carey, 62), Davie Henshaw (for Kavanagh, 66) | | | | Referee: B. Smith |

| 23 December 1995 | Connacht | 11–46 | Munster | Galway Sportsgrounds |
| | Try: Heaslip; Pen: Elwood (2) | Report | Try: McIvor; P. Clohessy; Crotty; D. Clohessy; Walsh; L. Toland; Con: Smith (5); Pen: Smith (2) | Referee: A. Lewis |
| Connacht lineup: 1. Declan Kavanagh, 2. Billy Mulcahy, 3. Ciaran Shanley, 4. Graham Heaslip, 5. J. O'Callaghan, 6. Rory Rogers, 7. Kevin Devlin (c), 8. Noel Mannion, 9. Diarmuid Reddan, 10. Eric Elwood, 11. Marcus O'Reilly, 12. Brian Carey, 13. R. Corrigan, 14. Nigel Carolan, 15. Aidan White.; Replacement: Mervyn Murphy (for Carey, 58) | | | | Referee: A. Lewis |

== Representative ==
| 4 November 1995 | Connacht | 21-20 | (South Africa) Griqualand West | Galway Sportsgrounds |
| | Try: Reddan; Murphy; Con: Carey; Pen: Carey (2); Drop: Carey | Report | Try: Ross; Horn; Con: Marthinus (2); Pen: Marthinus (2) |
Connacht lineup: 1. Declan Kavanagh, 2. Billy Mulcahy, 3. Ciaran Shanley, 4. Graham Heaslip, 5. Noel Mannion, 6. P Tarpey, 7. Rory Rogers, 8. Kevin Devlin, 9. Diarmuid Reddan, 10. Brian Carey, 11. Marcus O'Reilly, 12. R. Corrigan, 13. Mervyn Murphy, 14. Michael Devine, 15. Peter Boland.

| 17 November 1995 | Connacht | 27-5 | Fiji | Galway Sportsgrounds |
| | Try: Devlin; Rogers; Devine; Con: Elwood (3); Pen: Elwood (2) | | Try: Sadria |
Connacht lineup: 1. Declan Kavanagh, 2. Billy Mulcahy, 3. Ciaran Shanley, 4. Grahan Heaslip, 5. Robert McCarthy, 6. Rory Rogers, 7. Noel Mannion, 8. Kevin Devlin, 9. Diarmuid Reddan, 10. Eric Elwood, 11. Marcus O'Reilly, 12. R. Corrigan, 13. Mervyn Murphy, 14. Michael Devine, 15. Aidan White.; Replacements: Kenny Lawless (for Reddan), Neil Culliton (for McCarthy).

| 16 December 1995 | Connacht | 16-22 | (Scotland) Glasgow District | Galway Sportsgrounds |
| | Try: Culliton; Mannion; Pen: Elwood (2) | | Try: Little; Wallace; Breckenridge; Con: MacGregor (2); Pen: MacGregor |
Connacht lineup: 1. John Maher, 2. Kevin Tierney, 3. Davie Henshaw, 4. Robert McCarthy, 5. Chad O'Riordan, 6. Neil Culliton, 7. Noel Mannion (c), 8. Rory Rogers, 9. Kenny Lawless, 10. Brian Carey, 11. Aidan White, 12. Eric Elwood, 13. Mervyn Murphy, 14. Michael Devine, 15. Peter Boland.; Replacements: Nigel Carolan (for Devine), Billy Mulcahy (for Tierney)
