= 1995–96 Leinster Rugby season =

- Ground(s): Donnybrook, Dublin
- Coach(es): Jim Glennon; Ciaran Callan; Paul Dean
- Captain: Chris Pim
- Top scorer: Alan McGowan (92)
- Most tries: Conor O'Shea (4)
- League(s): Heineken Cup (semi-final); IRFU Interprovincial Championship (champions)

The 1995–96 season was Leinster Rugby's first season under professionalism. Ciaran Callan was officially head coach, but team manager Jim Glennon was in overally charge, with Callan coaching the forwards and Paul Dean coaching the backs. In the inaugural Heineken Cup, they won both their pool matches and qualified for the semi-final, which they lost to Cardiff. They won the IRFU Interprovincial Championship, winning all four of their matches.

== Background ==
On 26 August, rugby union was declared open to professionalism. At this stage the Irish provinces were still representative teams, not professional clubs. Many involved in the game were concerned that domestic clubs could not afford to pay players, who could be lost to professional teams in England. In September, the IRFU confirmed that, for this season, only senior international players would be paid, with a one-year moratorium on payment for club and provincial players. Up to 35 Ireland players would be offered £26,000 contracts for the 1996 Five Nations Championship. That squad included Leinster players [TBC]. As the situation developed, match fees became available for Heineken Cup and Interprovincial matches, with players who appeared in all six matches in line to receive almost £3,000.

The inaugural Heineken Cup was launched in the summer of 1995 on the initiative of the Five Nations Committee to provide a new level of cross border competition. Twelve sides representing Ireland, Wales, Italy, Romania and France competed in four pools of three with the group winners going directly into the semi-finals. English and Scottish teams did not take part in the inaugural competition. The IRFU confirmed that Ireland would enter provincial teams, as their clubs were unlikely to be strong enough for the competition. They were initially offered two places, but Tom Kiernan, Ireland's representative on the organising committee, was able to secure a third. The three places would go to the top three teams in the 1994 IRFU Interprovincial Championship, Munster, Ulster and Leinster.

== Players selected ==
Leinster Rugby squad
**Props**: (Ireland) Paul Flavin (Blackrock College); (Ireland) Henry Hurley (Old Wesley); (Ireland) Angus McKeen (Lansdowne); (Ireland) Dean Oswald (Blackrock College); (Ireland) **Paul Wallace** (Blackrock College); **Hookers**: (Ireland) **Shane Byrne** (Blackrock College); **Locks**: (Ireland) **Neil Francis** (Old Belevdere); (Ireland) Steve Jameson (St Mary's College); (Ireland) Malcolm O'Kelly (St Mary's College); (Ireland) **Brian Rigney** (Shannon)	**Back row**: (Ireland) Victor Costello (St Mary's College); (Ireland) Eric Miller (Leicester); (New Zealand) Dean Oswald (Blackrock); (Ireland) Chris Pim (Old Wesley) (c); (Ireland) Stephen Rooney (Lansdowne); **Scrum-halves**: (Ireland) **Niall Hogan** (Terenure); (Ireland) **Alain Rolland** (Blackrock College); **Fly-halves**: (Ireland) **Alan McGowan** (Blackrock College)	**Centres**: (Ireland) **Vince Cunningham** (St Mary's College); (Ireland) Kurt McQuilkin (Bective Rangers); **Wings**: (Ireland) Paddy Gavin (Old Belvedere); (Ireland) **Niall Woods** (Blackrock College); **Fullbacks**: (Ireland) **Ciaran Clarke** (Terenure); (Ireland) Ray Hennessy (Lansdowne); (Ireland) **Conor O'Shea** (London Irish)
(c) denotes the team captain, **Bold** denotes internationally capped players.^{*} denotes players qualified to play for Ireland on residency or dual nationality.

== Heineken Cup ==
=== Pool 3 ===
Team	P	W	D	L	Tries for	Tries against	Try diff	Points for	Points against	Points diff	Pts	Status
(Ireland) Leinster	2	2	0	0	4	3	1	47	43	4	4	Advanced to the semi-finals
(Wales) Pontypridd	2	1	0	1	2	2	0	53	35	18	2	Eliminated
(Italy) Milan	2	0	0	2	2	3	−1	33	55	−22	0	Eliminated

1 November 1995	Milan (Italy)	21–24	(Ireland) Leinster	Stadio Comunale Giuriati
14:30	Try: Crotti; Platania; Con: Bonomi; Pen: Dominguez	Report	Try: O'Shea; Woods; Con: McGowan; Pen: McGowan (4)	Attendance: 1,200; Referee: Franck Maciello
Leinster lineup: 1. Henry Hurley, 2. Shane Byrne, 3. Paul Wallace, 4. Brian Rigney, 5. Malcolm O'Kelly, 6. Chris Pim (c), 7. Victor Costello, 8. Dean Oswald, 9. Alain Rolland, 10. Alan McGowan, 11. Niall Woods, 12. Kurt McQuilkin, 13. Vince Cunningham, 14. Paddy Gavin, 15. Conor O'Shea.				Attendance: 1,200; Referee: Franck Maciello

6 December 1995	Leinster (Ireland)	23–22	(Wales) Pontypridd	Lansdowne Road
19:00	Try: Conor O'Shea; Alan McGowan; Con: Alan McGowan (2); Pen: Alan McGowan	Report	Try: Crispin Cormack; Con: Lee Jarvis; Pen: Lee Jarvis	Attendance: 4,000; Referee: Daniel Gillet
Leinster lineup: 1. Henry Hurley, 2. Shane Byrne, 3. Paul Wallace, 4. Brian Rigney, 5. Neil Francis, 6. Chris Pim (c), 7. Victor Costello, 8. Stephen Rooney, 9. Alain Rolland, 10. Alan McGowan, 11. Niall Woods, 12. Kurt McQuilkin, 13. Vince Cunningham, 14. Paddy Gavin, 15. Conor O'Shea.; Replacements: Angus McKeen (for Wallace), Eric Miller (for Costello), Niall Hogan.				Attendance: 4,000; Referee: Daniel Gillet

=== Semi-finals ===
30 December 1995	Leinster (Ireland)	14–23	(Wales) Cardiff	Lansdowne Road, Dublin
13:30	Try: Pim m Pen: McGowan (3)		Try: Hall c Taylor 50' c Con: Davies (2); Pen: Davies; Drop: Davies; Moore	Attendance: 7,350; Referee: Brian Campsall (England)
Leinster lineup: 1. Henry Hurley, 2. Shane Byrne, 3. Paul Wallace, 4. Steve Jameson, 5. Neil Francis, 6. Chris Pim (c), 7. Victor Costello, 8. Stephen Rooney, 9. Alain Rolland, 10. Alan McGowan, 11. Conor O'Shea, 12. Kurt McQuilkin, 13. Vince Cunningham, 14. Paddy Gavin, 15. Ciaran Clarke.; Replacements: Ray Hennessy (for Clarke)				Attendance: 7,350; Referee: Brian Campsall (England)

== IRFU Interprovincial Championship ==
Team	P	W	D	L	F	A	Pts	Status
Leinster	4	4	0	0	133	53	16	Champions; qualified for next season's Heineken Cup
Ulster	4	3	0	1	73	53	12	Qualified for next season's Heineken Cup
Munster	4	2	0	2	91	58	8	Qualified for next season's Heineken Cup
Exiles	4	1	0	3	71	113	4	
Connacht	4	0	0	4	51	142	0	

2 December 1995	Irish Exiles (Ireland)	26–42	Leinster	Heywood Road
	Try: Henderson; Saverimutto; Corcoran; Malone; Con: Corcoran (3)	Report	Try: Costello; Gavin; McQuilkin (3); Cunningham; Con: McGowan (3); Pen: McGowan; O'Shea	Referee: J. Cole
Leinster lineup: 1. Henry Hurley, 2. Shane Byrne, 3. Paul Wallace, 4. Brian Rigney, 5. Neil Francis, 6. Chris Pim (c), 7. Victor Costello, 8. Stephen Rooney, 9. Alain Rolland, 10. Alan McGowan, 11. Niall Woods, 12. Kurt McQuilkin, 13. Vince Cunningham, 14. Paddy Gavin, 15. Conor O'Shea.; Replacements: Ciaran Clarke (for McQuilkin), Niall Hogan (for Rolland).				Referee: J. Cole

2 December 1995	Leinster	41–9	Connacht	Donnybrook Stadium
	Try: O'Shea (2); Hogan; Gavin; McGowan; Con: McGowan (2); Pen: McGowan (3); O'Shea	Report	Pen: Elwood (3)	Referee: B. Smith
Leinster: 1. Paul Flavin, 2. Shane Byrne, 3. Paul Wallace, 4. Malcolm O'Kelly, 5. Neil Francis, 6. Chris Pim (c), 7. Victor Costello, 8. Stephen Rooney, 9. Niall Hogan, 10. Alan McGowan, 11. Niall Woods, 12. Kurt McQuilkin, 13. Vince Cunningham, 14. Paddy Gavin, 15. Conor O'Shea.				Referee: B. Smith

16 December 1995	Munster	15–19	Leinster	Thomond Park
	Try: R. Wallace (2); Con: Murray; Pen: Murray	Report	Try: Rolland; Con: McGowan; Pen: McGowan (4)	Referee: A. Watson
Leinster lineup: 1. Henry Hurley, 2. Shane Byrne, 3. Paul Wallace, 4. Steve Jameson, 5. Neil Francis, 6. Chris Pim (c), 7. Victor Costello, 8. Stephen Rooney, 9. Alain Rolland, 10. Alan McGowan, 11. Niall Woods, 12. Kurt McQuilkin, 13. Vince Cunningham, 14. Paddy Gavin, 15. Conor O'Shea.				Referee: A. Watson

23 December 1995	Leinster	31–3	Ulster	Donnybrook
	Try: Wallace; Jameson; Gavin; Con: McGowan (2); Pen: McGowan (4)	Report	Pen: McCall	Referee: C. White
Leinster: 1. Henry Hurley, 2. Shane Byrne, 3. Paul Wallace, 4. Steve Jameson, 5. Neil Francis, 6. Chris Pim (c), 7. Victor Costello, 8. Stephen Rooney, 9. Alain Rolland, 10. Alan McGowan, 11. Niall Woods, 12. Kurt McQuilkin, 13. Vince Cunningham, 14. Paddy Gavin, 15. Conor O'Shea.; Replacement: Ciaran Clarke (for Woods).				Referee: C. White

== Representative ==
26 November 1995	Leinster	15-6	(South Africa) Transvaal	Donnybrook
	Pen: McGowan (5)	Report	Pen: Gillingham (2)
Leinster lineup: 1. Henry Hurley, 2. Shane Byrne, 3. Paul Wallace, 4. Steve Jameson, 5. Neil Francis, 6. Chris Pim (c), 7. Victor Costello, 8. Stephen Rooney, 9. Alain Rolland, 10. Alan McGowan, 11. Niall Woods, 12. Kurt McQuilkin, 13. Vince Cunningham, 14. Paddy Gavin, 15. Ciaran Clarke.
