= 1998–99 Leinster Rugby season =

- Ground(s): Donnybrook, Dublin
- Coach: Mike Ruddock
- Top scorer: Alan McGowan (121)
- Most tries: Kevin Nowlan (5)
- League(s): Heineken Cup (3rd in pool); IRFU Interprovincial Championship (3rd)

The 1998–99 season was Leinster's fourth season under professionalism. Mike Ruddock was head coach. They competed in the Heineken Cup, finishing third in their pool, and the IRFU Interprovincial Championship, finishing third.

== Players selected ==
Leinster Rugby squad
**Props**: (Ireland) Emmet Byrne (St Mary's); (Ireland) **Reggie Corrigan** (Lansdowne); (Ireland) **Henry Hurley** (Clontarf); (Ireland) Angus McKeen (Lansdowne); **Hookers**: (Ireland) Shane Byrne (Blackrock); (Ireland) Peter Smyth (St Mary's); **Locks**: (Ireland) Leo Cullen (Blackrock); (Ireland) **Gabriel Fulcher** (Lansdowne) (c); (Ireland) Pat Holden (Terenure); (Ireland) Hubi Kos (Blackrock)	**Back row**: (Ireland) **Trevor Brennan** (St Mary's); (Ireland) Craig Brownlie (Clontarf); (Ireland) **Victor Costello** (St Mary's); (Ireland) B. Gibney (Blackrock); (Ireland) Colin McEntee (Lansdowne); (Ireland) Declan O'Brien (Clontarf); (Ireland) Patrick Ward (Clontarf); **Scrum-halves**: (Ireland) Derek Hegarty (Terenure); (Ireland) **David O'Mahony** (Lansdowne); (Ireland) Ciaran Scally (UCD); **Fly-halves**: (Ireland) **Alan McGowan** (Blackrock); (Ireland) Richie Murphy (Clontarf)	**Centres**: (Ireland) Brian Carey (Blackrock); (Ireland) Shane Horgan (Lansdowne); (Ireland) **Kurt McQuilkin** (Lansdowne); (Ireland) Martin Ridge (Lansdowne); **Wings**: (Ireland) Gordon D'Arcy (Lansdowne); (Ireland) Girvan Dempsey (Terenure); (Ireland) **Denis Hickie** (St Mary's); (Ireland) **John McWeeney** (St Mary's); **Fullbacks**: (Ireland) **Ciaran Clarke** (Terenure); (Ireland) **Kevin Nowlan** (St Mary's)
(c) denotes the team captain, **Bold** denotes internationally capped players.^{*} denotes players qualified to play for Ireland on residency or dual nationality.

== IRFU Interprovincial Championship ==
Team	P	W	D	L	F	A	BP	Pts	Status
Munster	6	4	0	2	125	92	2	18	Champions; qualified for 1999–2000 Heineken Cup
Ulster	6	3	0	3	137	119	3	15	Qualified for 1999–2000 Heineken Cup
Leinster	6	3	0	3	135	136	2	14	Qualified for 1999–2000 Heineken Cup
Connacht	6	2	0	4	95	145	3	11	Qualified for 1999–2000 European Challenge Cup

14 August 1998	Leinster	14-34	Ulster	Donnybrook
	Try: Horgan; Nowlan; Pen: McGowan (2)	Report	Try: Ward (2); McWhirter; McDowell; Con: Mason (4); Pen: Mason (2)
Leinster lineup: 1. Emmet Byrne, 2. Shane Byrne, 3. Angus McKeen, 4. Pat Holden, 5. Gabriel Fulcher, 6. Declan O'Brien, 7. B. Gibney, 8. Victor Costello, 9. David O'Mahony, 10. Alan McGowan, 11. Girvan Dempsey, 12. Brian Carey, 13. Shane Horgan, 14. John McWeeney, 15. Kevin Nowlan.; Replacements: Derek Hegarty (for O'Mahony 50'), Craig Brownlie (for Gibney 55'), Henry Hurley (for E. Byrne 70'), Martin Ridge (for Carey 72')

21 August 1998	Munster	18–24	Leinster	Dooradoyle
	Try: Horgan; Walsh; Con: Keane; Pen: Keane (2)	Report	Try: Dempsey; Nowlan; Con: McGowan; Pen: McGowan (4)
Leinster lineup: 1. Emmet Byrne, 2. Shane Byrne, 3. Angus McKeen, 4. Pat Holden, 5. Gabriel Fulcher, 6. Trevor Brennan, 7. Craig Brownlie, 8. Victor Costello, 9. David O'Mahony, 10. Alan McGowan, 11. Girvan Dempsey, 12. Martin Ridge, 13. Shane Horgan, 14. John McWeeney, 15. Kevin Nowlan.; Replacements: Brian Carey (for Horgan 40'), Henry Hurley (for E. Byrne 71').

28 August 1998	Leinster	29-24	Connacht	Donnybrook Stadium
	Try: Dempsey; Costello; Con: McGowan (2); Pen: McGowan (5)	Report	Try: Gavin; Murphy; Duignan; Screene; Con: Allnutt (2)
Leinster lineup: 1. Emmet Byrne, 2. Shane Byrne, 3. Angus McKeen, 4. Pat Holden, 5. Gabriel Fulcher, 6. Declan O'Brien, 7. Craig Brownlie, 8. Victor Costello, 9. David O'Mahony, 10. Alan McGowan, 11. Girvan Dempsey, 12. Martin Ridge, 13. Shane Horgan, 14. John McWeeney, 15. Kevin Nowlan.; Replacements: Brian Carey (for Ridge).

11 September 1998	Ulster	11-35	Leinster	Ravenhill
	Try: Rea; Pen: Mason (2)	Report	Try: Nowlan (2); Hegarty; Holden; Hickie; Con: McGowan (2); Pen: McGowan (2)
Leinster lineup: 1. Emmet Byrne, 2. Shane Byrne, 3. Henry Hurley, 4. Pat Holden, 5. Gabriel Fulcher, 6. Trevor Brennan, 7. Craig Brownlie, 8. Victor Costello, 9. Derek Hegarty, 10. Alan McGowan, 11. Girvan Dempsey, 12. Martin Ridge, 13. Shane Horgan, 14. Denis Hickie, 15. Kevin Nowlan.; Replacement: Declan O'Brien (for Brennan 55').

3 October 1998	Connacht	24-23	Leinster	Galway Sportsgrounds
	Try: Mulcahy; A. Reddan; Allnutt; Con: Allnut (3); Pen: Allnut	Report	Try: Nowlan; Dempsey; Con: McGowan (2); Pen: McGowan (2)
Leinster lineup: 1. Emmet Byrne, 2. Shane Byrne, 3. Angus McKeen, 4. Pat Holden, 5. Gabriel Fulcher, 6. Trevor Brennan, 7. Craig Brownlie, 8. Victor Costello, 9. Derek Hegarty, 10. Alan McGowan, 11. Girvan Dempsey, 12. Shane Horgan, 13. Brian Carey, 14. Gordon D'Arcy, 15. Kevin Nowlan.; Replacement: Declan O'Brien (for Brennan 52'), Ciaran Scally (for Hegarty 66'), Peter Smyth (for S. Byrne 72'), Henry Hurley (for E. Byrne 72'), Leo Cullen (for Costello 78').

23 October 1998	Leinster	10–25	Munster	Donnybrook
	Try: Scally; Con: McGowan; Pen: McGowan	Report	Try: Kelly; Con: Keane; Pen: Keane (4); Drop: Everitt (2)
Leinster lineup: 1. Emmet Byrne, 2. Shane Byrne, 3. Angus McKeen, 4. Pat Holden, 5. Gabriel Fulcher, 6. Trevor Brennan, 7. Craig Brownlie, 8. Victor Costello, 9. Derek Hegarty, 10. Alan McGowan, 11. Girvan Dempsey, 12. Brian Carey, 13. Shane Horgan, 14. John McWeeney, 15. Kevin Nowlan.; Replacements: Denis Hickie (for Carey 7'), Ciaran Scally (for McWeeney 16'), Declan O'Brien (for Brennan 51'), Reggie Corrigan (for McKeen 51'), Leo Cullen (for Costello 73'), Peter Smyth (for S. Byrne 74'), Richie Murphy (for Hegarty 81').

== Heineken Cup ==
=== Pool 1 ===
Team	P	W	D	L	Tries for	Tries against	Try diff	Points for	Points against	Points diff	Pts
(France) Stade Français	6	5	0	1	27	10	17	219	117	102	10
(Wales) Llanelli	6	3	0	3	12	22	−10	113	180	−67	6
(Ireland) Leinster	6	2	0	4	17	12	5	141	124	17	4
(France) Bègles-Bordeaux	6	2	0	4	11	23	−12	127	179	−52	4

19 September 1998	Llanelli Scarlets (Wales)	27–33	(Ireland) Leinster	Stradey Park
19:30	Try: Hodges; Evans; Con: Warlow; Pen: Jones (3); Warlow (2)	Report	Try: S. Byrne; D'Arcy; Penalty try Con: McGowan (2); Pen: McGowan (4)	Attendance: 9,000
Leinster lineup: 1. Henry Hurley, 2. Shane Byrne, 3. Emmet Byrne, 4. Pat Holden, 5. Gabriel Fulcher, 6. Trevor Brennan, 7. Victor Costello, 8. Craig Brownlie, 9. Derek Hegarty, 10. Alan McGowan, 11. Denis Hickie, 12. Shane Horgan, 13. Martin Ridge, 14. Gordon D'Arcy, 15. Kevin Nowlan.; Replacements: Brian Carey, Hubi Kos, Peter Smyth, Declan O'Brien.				Attendance: 9,000

25 September 1998	Leinster (Ireland)	17–28	(France) Stade Français	Donnybrook
18:30	Try: Ridge; Pen: McGowan (4)	Report	Try: Dourthe; Moni; Lombard; Con: Domínguez (2); Pen: Domínguez (3)	Attendance: 8,000
Leinster lineup: 1. Emmet Byrne, 2. Shane Byrne, 3. Angus McKeen, 4. Pat Holden, 5. Gabriel Fulcher, 6. Trevor Brennan, 7. Craig Brownlie, 8. Victor Costello, 9. Derek Hegarty, 10. Alan McGowan, 11. Girvan Dempsey, 12. Martin Ridge, 13. Shane Horgan, 14. Denis Hickie, 15. Kevin Nowlan.; Replacements: Gordon D'Arcy, Brian Carey, Peter Smyth, Declan O'Brien.				Attendance: 8,000

9 October 1998	Leinster (Ireland)	9–3	(France) Bordeaux-Begles	Donnybrook
18:30	Pen: Murphy (3)	Report	Pen: Fauthoux	Attendance: 4,000
Leinster lineup: 1. Emmet Byrne, 2. Shane Byrne, 3. Angus McKeen, 4. Pat Holden, 5. Gabriel Fulcher, 6. Trevor Brennan, 7. Victor Costello, 8. Patrick Ward, 9. Derek Hegarty, 10. Richie Murphy, 11. Girvan Dempsey, 12. Brian Carey, 13. Shane Horgan, 14. John McWeeney, 15. Kevin Nowlan.; Replacement: Craig Brownlie.				Attendance: 4,000

17 October 1998	Stade Français (France)	56–31	(Ireland) Leinster	Stade Jean-Bouin
16:00	Try: Lombard (2); Comba (2); Chaffardon; Gomes; Dourthe; Dominici; Con: Domínguez (8)	Report	Try: McWeeney; Dempsey; Penalty try Con: McGowan (2); Pen: McGowan	Attendance: 8,000
Leinster lineup: 1. Reggie Corrigan, 2. Shane Byrne, 3. Angus McKeen, 4. Pat Holden, 5. Gabriel Fulcher, 6. Trevor Brennan, 7. Patrick Ward, 8. Victor Costello, 9. Derek Hegarty, 10. Richie Murphy, 11. John McWeeney, 12. Brian Carey, 13. Shane Horgan, 14. Girvan Dempsey, 15. Ciaran Clarke.; Replacements: Alan McGowan, Ciaran Scally, Emmet Byrne, Leo Cullen, Craig Brownlie.				Attendance: 8,000

31 October 1998	Bordeaux-Begles (France)	31–10	(Ireland) Leinster	Stade Andre Moga
20:00	Try: Garcia; De Rougement; Souverbie; Schuwer; Con: Fauthoux (2); Pen: Fauthoux (3); Souverbie	Report	Try: McEntee; Con: McGowan; Pen: McGowan	Attendance: 3,000
Leinster lineup: 1. Reggie Corrigan, 2. Shane Byrne, 3. Angus McKeen, 4. Hubi Kos, 5. Gabriel Fulcher, 6. Declan O'Brien, 7. Patrick Ward, 8. Colin McEntee, 9. David O'Mahony, 10. Alan McGowan, 11. Denis Hickie, 12. Kurt McQuilkin, 13. Shane Horgan, 14. Girvan Dempsey, 15. Kevin Nowlan.; Replacements: Ciaran Clarke, Ciaran Scally, Leo Cullen, Craig Brownlie.				Attendance: 3,000

6 November 1998	Leinster (Ireland)	27–34	(Wales) Llanelli Scarlets	Donnybrook
18:30	Try: O'Brien (2); McGowan; Con: McGowan (3); Pen: McGowan (2)	Report	Try: Proctor (2); I. Boobyer; Neil Boobyer; Wyatt; Evans; Con: Jones (2)	Attendance: 4,500
Leinster lineup: 1. Reggie Corrigan, 2. Shane Byrne, 3. Emmet Byrne, 4. Hubi Kos, 5. Gabriel Fulcher, 6. Declan O'Brien, 7. Patrick Ward, 8. Colin McEntee, 9. Ciaran Scally, 10. Alan McGowan, 11. Girvan Dempsey, 12. Kurt McQuilkin, 13. Shane Horgan, 14. Kevin Nowlan, 15. Ciaran Clarke.; Replacements: Brian Carey, Peter Smyth, Henry Hurley, Pat Holden.				Attendance: 4,500
