= 1997–98 Munster Rugby season =

- Ground(s): Thomond Park (Capacity: 13,200); Musgrave Park (Capacity: 8,300)
- Coach: John Bevan
- Captain: Mick Galwey

The 1997–98 Munster Rugby season was Munster's third season as a professional team, during which they competed in the IRFU Interprovincial Championship and Heineken Cup.

== 1997–98 squad ==
Note: Flags indicate national union under World Rugby eligibility rules. Players may hold more than one non-World Rugby nationality.

Player	Position	Union
Mark McDermott	Hooker	Ireland
Frankie Sheahan	Hooker	Ireland
Des Clohessy	Prop	Ireland
Peter Clohessy	Prop	Ireland
John Hayes	Prop	Ireland
Aidan McSweeney	Prop	Ireland
Ian Murray	Prop	Ireland
Mick Galwey (c)	Lock	Ireland
Shane Leahy	Lock	Ireland
Donncha O'Callaghan	Lock	Ireland
Mick O'Driscoll	Lock	Ireland
Dara Kirby	Lock	Ireland
David Corkery	Back row	Ireland
Anthony Foley	Back row	Ireland
Eddie Halvey	Back row	Ireland
Jerry Murray	Back row	Ireland
Ultan O'Callaghan	Back row	Ireland
Alan Quinlan	Back row	Ireland
Greg Tuohy	Back row	Ireland
David Wallace	Back row	Ireland

Player	Position	Union
Stephen McIvor	Scrum-half	Ireland
Brian O'Meara	Scrum-half	Ireland
Peter Stringer	Scrum-half	Ireland
Barry Everitt	Fly-half	Ireland
Ronan O'Gara	Fly-half	Ireland
Conor Burke	Centre	Ireland
Killian Keane	Centre	Ireland
Cian Mahony	Centre	Ireland
Conor Mahony	Centre	Ireland
Mike Lynch	Centre	Ireland
Rhys Ellison	Wing	New Zealand
Anthony Horgan	Wing	Ireland
John Kelly	Wing	Ireland
John Lacey	Wing	Ireland
Andrew Thompson	Wing	Ireland
Dominic Crotty	Fullback	Ireland

== 1997–98 IRFU Interprovincial Championship ==
Team	P	W	D	L	F	A	BP	Pts	Status
Leinster	3	2	0	1	61	46	-	8	Champions; qualified for next season's Heineken Cup
Munster	3	2	0	1	56	43	-	8	Qualified for next season's Heineken Cup
Ulster	3	1	0	2	59	65	-	4	Qualified for next season's Heineken Cup
Connacht	3	1	0	2	42	64	-	4	

16 August 1997

Connacht (Ireland)	9–29	(Ireland) Munster
	Report

Galway Sportsgrounds

23 August 1997

Munster (Ireland)	15–12	(Ireland) Leinster
	Report

Mardyke

30 August 1997

Ulster (Ireland)	22–12	(Ireland) Munster
Try: Park; Con: Laing; Pen: Laing (4); Drop: Laing	Report	Pen: O'Gara (4)

Ravenhill
Referee: M. White

== 1997–98 Heineken Cup ==
=== Pool 4 ===
Team	P	W	D	L	Tries for	Tries against	Try diff	Points for	Points against	Points diff	Pts
(England) Harlequins	6	4	0	2	21	12	9	198	141	57	8
(Wales) Cardiff	6	4	0	2	17	15	2	184	146	38	8
(France) Bourgoin	6	2	0	4	14	21	−7	141	180	−39	4
(Ireland) Munster	6	2	0	4	7	11	−4	93	149	−56	4

7 September 1997
14:00

Harlequins (England)	48–40	(Ireland) Munster
	Report

Twickenham Stoop
Attendance: 3,682
Referee: Patrick Thomas

13 September 1997
14:30

Cardiff (Wales)	43–23	(Ireland) Munster
	Report

Cardiff Arms Park
Attendance: 4,500
Referee: Brian Campsall

20 September 1997
15:00

Munster (Ireland)	17–15	(France) Bourgoin
	Report

Thomond Park
Attendance: 6,000
Referee: Huw Lewis

27 September 1997
15:00

Munster (Ireland)	32–37	(Wales) Cardiff
	Report

Musgrave Park
Attendance: 5,000
Referee: Tony Spreadbury

4 October 1997
15:00

Bourgoin (France)	21–6	(Ireland) Munster
	Report

Stade Pierre Rajon
Attendance: 6,000
Referee: Chris White

12 October 1997
16:30

Munster (Ireland)	23–16	(England) Harequins
	Report

Thomond Park
Attendance: 10,000
Referee: Nigel Whitehouse
