= 1996–97 Connacht Rugby season =

- Ground(s): The Sportsground, Galway
- Coach: Warren Gatland
- Captain: Kevin Devlin
- Top scorer: Eric Elwood (128)
- Most tries: Brian Carey (4)
- League(s): Challenge Cup (4th in pool); IRFU Interprovincial Championship (4th of 4)

The 1996-97 season was Connacht's second season under professionalism. Warren Gatland was in his first season as head coach, appointed in August 1996 following the resignation of Eddie O'Sullivan. They competed in the inaugural European Challenge Cup (then known as the European Conference) and the IRFU Interprovincial Championship, embarked on a two-match tour of Sweden, and hosted Australia.

At this stage the Irish provinces were still representative teams, not professional clubs. However, the provinces were now offering contracts and match fees for Heineken Cup and Interprovincial matches, although these contracts sometimes conflicted with players contracted to clubs in England.

== Players selected ==
Connacht Rugby squad
**Props**: (Ireland) **Tom Clancy** (St Mary's); (Ireland) D. Coon (Wanderers); (Ireland) D. Ennis (Skerries); (Ireland) Michael Finlay (Wanderers); (Ireland) Gareth Halpin (St Mary's); (Ireland) John Maher (Buccaneers); (Ireland) R. Ward (Old Belvedere); **Hookers**: (Ireland) Barry Browne (St Mary's); (Ireland) Billy Mulcahy (Skerries); **Locks**: (Ireland) Graham Heaslip (Galwegians); (Ireland) Shane Leahy (Lansdowne); (Ireland) Mick O'Neill (Blackrock)	**Back row**: (Ireland) Ronnie Culliton (Wanderers); (Ireland) Kevin Devlin (St. Marys) (c); (Ireland) Barry Gavin (Galwegians); (Ireland) Mark Reilly (Oxford University); (Ireland) Rory Rogers (Blackrock); (Ireland) Neil Taylor (Galwegians); **Scrum-halves**: (Ireland) Conor McGuinness (St Mary's); (Ireland) Diarmuid Reddan (Galwegians); **Fly-halves**: (Ireland) **Eric Elwood** (Lansdowne)	**Centres**: (Ireland) **Nicky Barry** (Clontarf); (Ireland) Mervyn Murphy (Galwegians); (Ireland) Alan Reddan (Lansdowne); **Wings**: (Ireland) David Beggy (Blackrock); (Ireland) Nigel Carolan (Corinthians); (Ireland) Michael Devine (Buccaneers); (Ireland) Dermot Finnegan (Wanderers); (Ireland) Mick Kearin (Lansdowne); **Fullbacks**: (Ireland) Brian Carey (Blackrock); (Ireland) Owen Cobbe (Wanderers)
(c) denotes the team captain, **Bold** denotes internationally capped players.^{*} denotes players qualified to play for Ireland on residency or dual nationality.

== Tour ==
3 September 1996	Sweden	7-47	Connacht	Stockholm
	Try: Alexsson; Con: Njuru	Report	Try: Cobbe; Elwood; Mulcahy; Devine; Heaslip; Finnegan; Con: Elwood (2); Pen: Elwood (3)
Connacht lineup: 1. Tom Clancy, 2. Billy Mulcahy, 3. R. Ward, 4. Mick O'Neill, 5. Graham Heaslip, 6. Rory Rogers, 7. Mark Reilly, 8. Kevin Devlin (c), 9. Diarmuid Reddan, 10. Eric Elwood, 11. Dermot Finnegan, 12. Nicky Barry, 13. Alan Reddan, 14. Michael Devine, 15. Owen Cobbe.; Replacements: B. Gavin (for Reilly 36'), Nigel Carolan (for Barry 68'), D. Ennis (for Clancy 72').

6 September 1996	Stockholm Exiles (Sweden)	12-65	Connacht	Stockholm
		Report	Try: Carey (2); Kearin (2); A. Reddan; Gavin; Beggy; Taylor; Finnegan; Heaslip; Con: Cobbe (6); Pen: Cobbe
Connacht lineup: 1. John Maher, 2. Barry Browne, 3. D. Coon, 4. Mick O'Neill, 5. Shane Leahy, 6. Neil Taylor, 7. Barry Gavin, 8. Kevin Devlin (c), 9. Coor McGuinness, 10. Owen Cobbe, 11. David Beggy, 12. Alan Reddan, 13. Nigel Carolan, 14. Mick Kearin, 15. Brian Carey.; Replacements: Gareth Heaslip (for O'Neill), D. Ennis (for Maher), Dermot Finnegan (for Beggy).

== IRFU Interprovincial Championship ==
Team	P	W	D	L	F	A	BP	Pts	Status
Munster	3	3	0	0	117	92	-	6	Champions; qualified for 1997–98 Heineken Cup
Leinster	3	1	0	2	88	92	-	2	Qualified for 1997–98 Heineken Cup
Ulster	3	1	0	2	81	89	-	2	Qualified for 1997–98 Heineken Cup
Connacht	3	1	0	2	77	90	-	2	Qualified for 1997–98 European Challenge Cup

21 September 1996	Munster	45–28	Connacht	Temple Hill
	Try: Lacey (2); Foley; McCahill; Walsh; Con: O'Halloran (4); Pen: O'Halloran (3); Drop: O'Halloran	Report	Try: A. Reddan; Devine (2); Con: Elwood (2); Pen: Elwood (3)	Referee: A. Watson
Connacht: 1. John Maher (Old Belvedere), 2. Billy Mulcahy (Skerries), 3. R. Ward (Old Belvedere), 4. Graham Heaslip (Galwegians), 5. Mick O'Neill (Blackrock), 6. Rory Rogers (Blackrock), 7. Barry Gavin (Galwegians), 8. Kevin Devlin (St. Mary's, c), 9. Conor McGuinness (St. Mary's), 10. Eric Elwood (Lansdowne), 11. Dermot Finnegan (Wanderers), 12. Nicky Barry (Clontarf), 13. Alan Reddan (Lansdowne), 14. Michael Devine (Buccaneers), 15. Brian Carey (Blackrock).; Replacements: Nigel Carolan (Corinthians, for Barry), Diarmuid Reddan (Galwegians, for Carey).				Referee: A. Watson

28 September 1996	Ulster	32-27	Connacht	Ravenhill
	Try: Duncan; Laing; Topping; Con: Laing; Pen: Laing (5)	Report	Try: Carey; Elwood; Con: Elwood; Pen: Elwood (5); Drop: Elwood	Referee: B. Smith
Connacht lineup: 1. John Maher, 2. Billy Mulcahy, 3. R. Ward, 4. Graham Heaslip, 5. Shane Leahy, 6. Rory Rogers, 7. Barry Gavin, 8. Kevin Devlin (c), 9. Conor McGuinness, 10. Eric Elwood, 11. Dermot Finnegan, 12. Nigel Carolan, 13. Alan Reddan, 14. Michael Devine, 15. Brian Carey.				Referee: B. Smith

5 October 1996	Connacht	22-13	Leinster	Galway Sportsgrounds
	Try: Leahy; Elwood; Pen: Elwood (3)	Report	Try: Francis; Con: Governey; Pen: Governey (2)
Connacht lineup: 1. John Maher, 2. Billy Mulcahy, 3. R. Ward, 4. Graham Heaslip, 5. Shane Leahy, 6. Rory Rogers, 7. Barry Gavin, 8. Kevin Devlin (c), 9. Conor McGuinness, 10. Eric Elwood, 11. Mick Kearin, 12. Nigel Carolan, 13. Alan Reddan, 14. Michael Devine, 15. Brian Carey.

== European Challenge Cup ==
=== Pool 3 ===
Team	P	W	D	L	Tries for	Tries against	Try diff	Points for	Points against	Points diff	Pts
(England) Northampton Saints	5	5	0	0	28	12	+16	207	88	+119	10
(France) Toulon	5	4	0	1	22	10	+12	164	102	+62	8
(England) Orrell	5	2	0	3	18	22	−4	122	173	−51	4
(Ireland) Connacht	5	2	0	3	9	17	−8	94	131	−37	4
(Wales) Dunvant	5	1	0	4	15	22	−7	106	169	−63	2
(Italy) Petrarca	5	1	0	4	10	19	−9	118	148	−30	2
Source : www.ercrugby.com Points breakdown: *2 points for a win *1 point for a draw

12 October 1996	Connacht (Ireland)	34–12	(Italy) Petrarca	The Sportsground
	Try: Leahy; Mulcahy; Barry; Con: Elwood (2); Pen: Elwood (5)		Pen: De Marco (4)
Connacht lineup: 1. John Maher, 2. Billy Mulcahy, 3. Michael Finlay, 4. Graham Heaslip, 5. Shane Leahy, 6. Rory Rogers, 7. Kevin Devlin (c), 8. Barry Gavin, 9. Conor McGuinness, 10 Eric Elwood, 11. Mick Kearin, 12. Nicky Barry, 13. Alan Reddan, 14. Michael Devine, 15. Brian Carey.; Replacement: Diarmuid Reddan.

16 October 1996	Dunvant (Wales)	26–9	(Ireland) Connacht	Broadacre, Dunvant
	Try: Spender; Evans; Con: Thomas (2); Pen: Thomas (4); Cards: Spender (yellow card)	Report	Pen: Elwood (3); Cards: Shane Leahy (yellow card)
Connacht lineup: 1. John Maher, 2. Billy Mulcahy, 3. Michael Finlay, 4. Graham Heaslip, 5. Shane Leahy, 6. Rory Rogers, 7. Barry Gavin, 8. Kevin Devlin (c), 9. Diarmuid Reddan, 10. Eric Elwood, 11. Mick Kearin, 12. Nicky Barry, 13. Alan Reddan, 14. Michael Devine, 15. Brian Carey.; Replacements: Mick O'Neill (for Leahy 43')

19 October 1996	Connacht (Ireland)	11–31	(England) Northampton Saints	The Sportsground
	Try: Carey; Pen: Elwood; Carey	Report	Try: Beal (2); Grayson; Dawson; Townsend; Con: Grayson (3)
Connacht lineup: 1. Tom Clancy, 2. Barry Browne, 3. Michael Finlay, 4. Graham Heaslip, 5. Shane Leahy, 6. Mark Reilly, 7. Rory Rogers (c), 8. Barry Gavin, 9. Conor McGuinness, 10. Eric Elwood, 11. Mick Kearin, 12. Alan Reddan, 13. Nicky Barry, 14. Michael Devine, 15. Brian Carey.; Replacement: Kevin Devlin (for Rogers 23'), Ronnie Culliton (for Gavin 3')

27 October 1996	Toulon (France)	44–10	(Ireland) Connacht	Stade Mayol
	Try: Teisseire (2); Durand (4); Mignoni; Con: Teisseire (3); Pen: Teisseire	Report	Try: A. Reddan; Con: Cobbe; Pen: Cobbe
Connacht lineup: 1. Tom Clancy, 2. Billy Mulcahy, Michael Finlay, 4. Graham Heaslip, 5. Shane Leahy, 6. Neil Taylor, 7. Kevin Devlin (c), 8. Mark Reilly, 9. Conor McGuinness, 10. Owen Cobbe, 11. Mick Kearin, 12. Nicky Barry, 13. Alan Reddan, 14. Michael Devine, 15. Brian Carey.; Replacements: Gareth Halpin, Nigel Carolan, Barry Browne, Mick O'Neill

2 November 1996	Connacht (Ireland)	30–18	(England) Orrell	The Sportsground
	Try: Kearin; Heaslip; Penalty try Con: Elwood (3); Pen: Elwood (3)		Try: Smith (2); Turner; Pen: Hitchmough
Connacht lineup: 1. John Maher, 2. Barry Browne, 3. Michael Finlay, 4. Graham Heaslip, 5. Ronnie Culliton, 6. Shane Leahy, 7. Rory Rogers, 8. Barry Gavin, 9. Conor McGuinness, 10. Eric Elwood, 11. Nigel Carolan, 12. Nicky Barry, 13. Alan Reddan, 14. Mick Kearin, 15. Owen Cobbe.

== Representative ==
13 November 1996	Connacht	20-37	Australia	Galway Sportsgrounds
	Try: Leahy; Pen: Elwood (5)	Report	Try: Gavin; Gregan (2); Finegan; Murdoch; Con: Wallace (3); Pen: Wallace (2)
Connacht lineup: 1. John Maher, 2. Billy Mulcahy, 3. Michael Finlay, 2. Graham Heaslip, 5. Shane Leahy, 6. Neil Taylor, 7. Barry Gavin, Rory Rogers (c) 9. Conor McGuinness, 10. Eric Elwood, 11. Nigel Carolan, 12. Nicky Barry, 13. Alan Reddan, 14. Mick Kearin, 15. Brian Carey.; Replacements: Mark Reilly (for Taylor 53'), R. Ward (for Maher 62'), Mervyn Murphy (for Barry 76')
