= Alan McGowan =

Alan McGowan may refer to:

- Alan McGowan (Australian footballer) (1926−2019), Australian rules footballer
- Alan McGowan (rugby union) (born 1972), Irish rugby union player
