= Brian Begley =

Brian Begley may refer to:

- Brian Begley (dual player) (born 1979), Irish hurler and Gaelic footballer
- Brian Begley (rugby union) (born 1973), Irish rugby union player
