= Noel Healy =

- Born: 20 November 1959 (age 66) Limerick, Ireland
- Height: 1.80 m (5 ft 11 in)
- Weight: 108 kg (17.0 st; 238 lb)

Rugby union career
- Position: Prop
Amateur team(s)
Years	Team	Apps	(Points)
- Shannon
Senior career
Years	Team	Apps	(Points)
1995–1998	Munster	6	(0)

Noel Healy (born 20 November 1959) is an Irish former rugby union player, who played for Shannon and Munster.

== Career ==
Healy was a proud Shannon player throughout his rugby career, and had been retired for five years by the time the 1995–96 season, but Niall O'Donovan persuaded Healy to come out of retirement to provide competition to the younger props, and Healy ended up winning his first Munster cap at the age of 36 in 1996. He played against Australia and won his last cap aged 39. His final game for Shannon, against Clontarf in the All-Ireland League, came shortly before his 40th birthday.

He became Shannon president in 2016, at the time of Anthony Foley's sudden death, and lead Shannon remembrance of another of their famous players. As well as his duties with Shannon, Healy also runs a courier business; Healy Couriers Ltd.
