= Mick Leahy (rugby union) =

Irish rugby union player (1935–2023)

- Full name: Michael William Leahy
- Born: 6 June 1935 Woodford, Co. Galway, Ireland
- Died: 16 November 2023 (aged 88)
- Height: 6 ft 2 in (188 cm)
- University: University College Cork
- Occupation: Policeman

Rugby union career
- Position: Lock
International career
Years	Team	Apps	(Points)
1964	Ireland	1	(0)

Michael William Leahy (6 June 1935 – 16 November 2023) was an Irish international rugby union player.

Leahy hailed from Woodford in County Galway and was taught his rugby by the village's only previous international, winger Dickie Roche. He gained an Ireland cap against Wales during the 1964 Five Nations and was a Munster Senior Cup-winner with Highfield. A second-rower, Leahy also competed for University College Cork and Connacht.

A Gardaí superintendent, Leahy had four sons who won Munster Schools titles passing through Crescent College. One of his sons, Kelvin, was capped by Ireland on their 1992 tour of New Zealand and another, Shane, played for Ireland A.

== See also ==
- List of Ireland national rugby union players
