= 1996–97 Heineken Cup pool stage =

- Season: 1996–97 Heineken Cup
- Date: 12 October 1996 – 2 November 1996

Qualifiers
- Seed 1: (England) Leicester
- Seed 2: (France) Brive
- Seed 3: (France) Toulouse
- Seed 4: (France) Dax
- Seed 5: (England) Harlequins
- Seed 6: (Wales) Cardiff RFC
- Seed 7: (England) Bath
- Seed 8: (Wales) Llanelli RFC

The 1996–97 Heineken Cup pool stage was played during October and November 1996. The top two teams in each group qualified for the quarter-finals.

All times are local to the game site.

Key to colours
Top two teams in each group advance to quarter-finals

== Pool 1 ==
Team	P	W	D	L	Tries for	Tries against	Try diff	Points for	Points against	Points diff	Pts
(France) Dax	4	3	0	1	16	2	14	141	69	72	6
(England) Bath	4	3	0	1	15	8	7	136	88	48	6
(Wales) Pontypridd	4	3	0	1	7	3	4	97	60	37	6
(Italy) Benetton Treviso	4	1	0	3	13	15	−2	106	135	−29	2
(Scotland) Edinburgh	4	0	0	4	6	29	−23	71	199	−128	0

12 October 1996
14:30

Pontypridd (Wales)	28–22	(Italy) Benetton Treviso

Sardis Road
Attendance: 3,500

12 October 1996
15:00

Bath (England)	55–26	(Scotland) Edinburgh

Recreation Ground
Attendance: 6,500

16 October 1996
19:00

Edinburgh (Scotland)	10–32	(Wales) Pontypridd

Myreside
Attendance: 3,000

16 October 1996
20:00

Benetton Treviso (Italy)	14–34	(France) Dax

Stadio Comunale di Monigo
Attendance: 1,000

19 October 1996
14:30

Pontypridd (Wales)	19–6	(England) Bath

Sardis Road
Attendance: 7,000

20 October 1996
14:30

Dax (France)	69–12	(Scotland) Edinburgh

Parc Municipal des Sports
Attendance: 8,000

26 October 1996
15:00

Bath (England)	25–16	(France) Dax

Recreation Ground
Attendance: 8,000

27 October 1996
14:30

Edinburgh (Scotland)	23–43	(Italy) Benetton Treviso

Myreside
Attendance: 1,500

2 November 1996
14:30

Benetton Treviso (Italy)	27–50	(England) Bath

Stadio Comunale di Monigo
Attendance: 2,500

2 November 1996
19:30

Dax (France)	22–18	(Wales) Pontypridd

Parc Municipal des Sports
Attendance: 9,000

== Pool 2 ==
Team	P	W	D	L	Tries for	Tries against	Try diff	Points for	Points against	Points diff	Pts
(England) Leicester	4	4	0	0	14	3	11	114	43	71	8
(Wales) Llanelli	4	2	0	2	9	9	0	97	81	16	4
(Ireland) Leinster	4	2	0	2	9	12	−3	86	109	−23	4
(France) Pau	4	1	0	3	19	10	9	137	103	34	2
(Scotland) Scottish Borders	4	1	0	3	7	24	−17	80	178	−98	2

12 October 1996
14:30

Llanelli (Wales)	34–17	(Ireland) Leinster

Stradey Park
Attendance: 2,800

12 October 1996
17:00

Pau (France)	85–28	(Scotland) Borders

Stade Municipal du Hameau
Attendance: 3,000

16 October 1996
18:45

Leinster (Ireland)	10–27	(England) Leicester Tigers

Lansdowne Road
Attendance: 3,500

16 October 1996
19:00

Borders (Scotland)	24–16	(Wales) Llanelli

Mansfield Park
Attendance: 2,000

19 October 1996
14:30

Llanelli (Wales)	31–15	(France) Pau

Stradey Park
Attendance: 3,000

19 October 1996
14:30

Leicester Tigers (England)	43–3	(Scotland) Borders

Welford Road
Attendance: 4,609

26 October 1996
14:30

Borders (Scotland)	25–34	(Ireland) Leinster

The Greenyards
Attendance: 3,500

26 October 1996
16:45

Pau (France)	14–19	(England) Leicester

Stade Municipal du Hameau
Attendance: 9,000

2 November 1996
14:30

Leinster (Ireland)	25–23	(France) Pau

Donnybrook
Attendance: 4,000

2 November 1996
15:00

Leicester Tigers (England)	25–16	(Wales) Llanelli

Welford Road
Attendance: 11,000

== Pool 3 ==
Team	P	W	D	L	Tries for	Tries against	Try diff	Points for	Points against	Points diff	Pts
(France) Brive	4	4	0	0	13	8	5	106	65	41	8
(England) Harlequins	4	3	0	1	20	8	12	131	95	36	6
(Wales) Neath	4	2	0	2	10	16	−6	83	109	−26	4
(Ireland) Ulster	4	1	0	3	6	10	−4	75	87	−12	2
(Scotland) Caledonia	4	0	0	4	13	20	−7	117	156	−39	0

12 October 1996
17:15

Brive (France)	34–19	(Wales) Neath

Parc Municipal des Sports
Attendance: 5,000

13 October 1996
14:30

Caledonia (Scotland)	34–41	(Ireland) Ulster
Try: Rowen Shepherd; Paul Rouse; Stuart Grimes; Con: Rowen Shepherd (2); Pen: Rowen Shepherd (4); Drop: Jonathan Newton	Report	Try: David Humphreys (2); Jan Cunningham (2); Stephen McKinty; Con: David Humphreys (2); Pen: David Humphreys (2); Stuart Laing; Drop: David Humphreys

McDiarmid Park
Attendance: 2,400
Referee: J. C. Gastou

16 October 1996
19:00

Ulster (Ireland)	15–21	(England) Harlequins
Pen: David Humphreys (4); Drop: David Humphreys	Report	Try: Mick Watson; Daren O'Leary; Con: Will Carling; Pen: Will Carling (2)

Ravenhill
Attendance: 8,000
Referee: I. Ramage

16 October 1996
19:15

Neath (Wales)	27–18	(Scotland) Caledonia

The Gnoll
Attendance: 2,000

19 October 1996
15:00

Harlequins (England)	44–22	(Wales) Neath

Twickenham Stoop
Attendance: 3,500

20 October 1996
15:00

Caledonia (Scotland)	30–32	(France) Brive

McDiarmid Park
Attendance: 2,000

26 October 1996
14:30

Neath (Wales)	15–13	(Ireland) Ulster
Try: Steve Williams; Leighton Gerrard; Con: Geraint Davies; Pen: Geraint Davies	Report	Try: Andrew Matchett; Con: David Humphreys; Pen: David Humphreys (2)

The Gnoll
Attendance: 2,000

27 October 1996
16:15

Brive (France)	23–10	(England) Harlequins

Parc Municipal des Sports
Attendance: 13,000

2 November 1996
14:30

Ulster (Ireland)	6–17	(France) Brive
Pen: David Humphreys; Drop: David Humphreys	Report	Try: Francois Duboisset; Sebastian Carrat; Sébastien Viars; Con: David Venditti

Ravenhill
Attendance: 3,500
Referee: H. Lewis

2 November 1996
14:30

Harlequins (England)	56–35	(Scotland) Caledonia

Twickenham Stoop
Attendance: 3,751

== Pool 4 ==
Team	P	W	D	L	Tries for	Tries against	Try diff	Points for	Points against	Points diff	Pts
(France) Toulouse	4	3	0	1	21	13	8	157	142	15	6
(Wales) Cardiff	4	3	0	1	16	7	9	135	97	38	6
(England) London Wasps	4	2	0	2	17	14	3	156	115	41	4
(Ireland) Munster	4	2	0	2	11	22	−11	109	135	−26	4
(Italy) Milan	4	0	0	4	6	15	−9	73	141	−68	0

12 October 1996
15:00

Munster (Ireland)	23–5	(Italy) Milan
	Report

Musgrave Park
Attendance: 1,500

13 October 1996
15:00

London Wasps (England)	24–26	(Wales) Cardiff

Loftus Road
Attendance: 6,000

16 October 1996
19:15

Cardiff (Wales)	48–18	(Ireland) Munster
	Report

Cardiff Arms Park
Attendance: 4,000

16 October 1996
20:30

Milan (Italy)	26–44	(France) Toulouse

Stadio Comunale Giuriati
Attendance: 500

19 October 1996
15:30

Munster (Ireland)	49–22	(England) London Wasps
	Report

Thomond Park
Attendance: 6,000

19 October 1996
15:30

Toulouse (France)	36–20	(Wales) Cardiff

Les Sept Deniers
Attendance: 10,000

26 October 1996
15:00

London Wasps (England)	77–17	(France) Toulouse

Loftus Road
Attendance: 8,000

27 October 1996
15:00

Cardiff (Wales)	41–19	(Italy) Milan

Arms Park
Attendance: 3,000

2 November 1996
14:30

Milan (Italy)	23–33	(England) London Wasps

Stadio Comunale Giuriati
Attendance: 1,200

2 November 1996
16:00

Toulouse (France)	60–19	(Ireland) Munster
	Report

Les Sept Deniers
Attendance: 14,000

== Seeding ==
Seed	Pool Winners	Pts	TF	+/−
1	(England) Leicester	8	14	+71
2	(France) Brive	8	13	+41
3	(France) Toulouse	6	21	+15
4	(France) Dax	6	16	+72
Seed	Pool Runners-up	Pts	TF	+/−
5	(England) Harlequins	6	20	+36
6	(Wales) Cardiff RFC	6	16	+38
7	(England) Bath	6	15	+48
8	(Wales) Llanelli RFC	4	9	+16

== See also ==
- 1996–97 Heineken Cup
