= Hibernia Real Estate Group =

Hibernia Real Estate Group Ltd
- ISIN: IE00BGHQ1986
- Founded: 2013; 13 years ago
- Headquarters: Dublin, Ireland
- Key people: Tom Edwards-Moss, CEO; Kevin Nowlan, Co-founder and former CEO; Frank O'Neil, Chief operating officer Daniel Kitchen, Chairman
- Products: Real estate portfolios
- Owner: Brookfield Asset Management (2022–present)
- Website: www.hiberniareg.com

Hibernia Real Estate Group Ltd, formerly called Hibernia REIT plc when it was a public real estate investment trust, is a real estate development firm headquartered in Dublin, Ireland. As of 2018, the company said that it owned 32 properties in Dublin and had a portfolio valued at €1.309 billion.

On 17 June 2022, the Hibernia REIT was acquired by Brookfield Asset Management. The company had previously been listed on Euronext Dublin's ISEQ 20 index, as well as the London Stock Exchange.

== History ==
Hibernia was founded by Kevin Nowlan and his father Bill. It was floated on the stock markets in December 2013. It raised €385 million in its IPO, €220 million of which it had invested by September 2014.

The company met criticism when, in April 2015, it demolished the Windmill Lane studio where U2 had recorded their debut album, Boy. The iconic graffiti wall was preserved and auctioned to raise funds for Movember.

Kevin Nowlan, previously of WK Nowlan Real Estate Advisors, served as chief executive from November 2015 until the Brookfield takeover in 2022.

In 2017, Hibernia worked with Twitter to repurpose the offices at Cumberland Place, Dublin 2. The finished space was awarded a LEED Platinum award.

=== Takeover ===
In June 2022, Hibernia was taken over by Brookfield Asset Management, a Canadian investment management firm. Brookfield had offered investors €1.60 per share as well as a 3.4c dividend in March; this valued Hibernia at around €1.1 billion, 36% above the share price at the time. Hibernia's board, accounting for 1.37% of the company's shares, recommended the offer unanimously. One of the firms largest shareholders, Hazelview Investments, sold its 4.55% stake in April. After the takeover, Tom Edwards-Moss, the company's CFO since June 2014, was appointed the new chief executive and outgoing CEO Kevin Nowlan was made an executive director. The company changed its name to Hibernia Real Estate Group in August 2022, reflecting the fact it was no longer a real estate investment trust.

== Awards ==
Hibernia won a Silver EPRA Best Practices Recommendations Award for financial reporting in 2015 and a Gold in 2016, 2017 and 2018.

It also won a Bronze EPRA Best Practices Recommendations for sustainability in 2016, a Silver in 2017 and a Gold in 2018.

== See also ==
- List of companies of Ireland
