= Mata'afa Keenan =

- Born: 26 October 1960 (age 66) Rarotonga, Cook Islands

Rugby union career
- Position: Lock
Amateur team(s)
Years	Team	Apps	(Points)
1981-1991	University of Auckland		
Senior career
Years	Team	Apps	(Points)
1981-1991	Auckland		
1984, 1990	Auckland B		
1991-1994	Marist St. Joseph		
1992	Irish Exiles		
International career
Years	Team	Apps	(Points)
1991-1994	Samoa	10	(0)

Mata'afa George Keenan (born Rarotonga, 26 October 1960) is a Cook Islands-born Samoan former rugby union player. He played as a lock.

== Career ==
Keenan debuted in the 1991 Rugby World Cup roster in the match against Wales, at Cardiff on 6 October 1991. His last international match was against Australia at Sydney, on 6 August 1994.
