= Wilson's Hospital School =

Schoolhouse in County Westmeath, Ireland

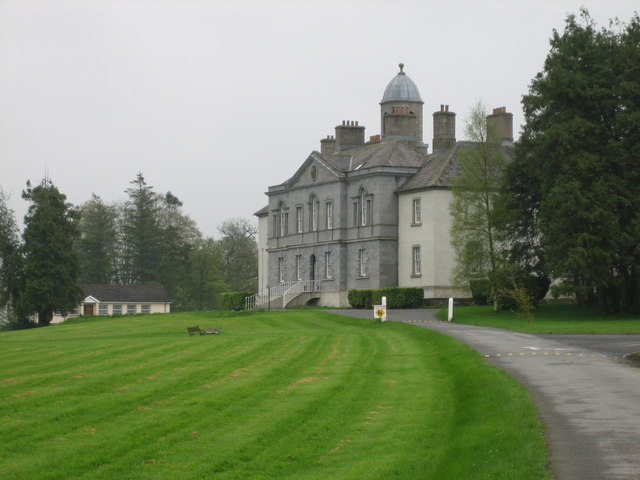
- Main school building in 2006

Location
- Multyfarnham, County Westmeath; Ireland; 53.612°N 7.417°W

Information
- School type: Boarding school
- Motto: Res Non Verba (Deeds, not words)
- Founded: 1761
- Founder: Andrew Wilson
- Enrollment: 410 (2019)

Wilson's Hospital School is a Church of Ireland co-educational boarding school in County Westmeath, Ireland. Founded in 1761, it is Westmeath's oldest school, and is housed in a protected Georgian building near the village of Multyfarnham, 11 km north-west of Mullingar. A private fee paying school for most of its history, in 2011 it transferred to the voluntary aided sector and does not charge fees for schooling but retains fees for boarding and extra curricular activities.

== History ==
Wilson's Hospital School was founded in 1761 by Andrew Wilson as a school for young Protestant boys and also as a hospital for old men. The school's main Georgian building, including its 220-seater chapel, was designed by architect John Pentland and completed between 1759 and 1761. It is listed, together with other structures on the grounds, on the Record of Protected Structures for County Westmeath.

The school grounds were the site of a battle preceding the Battle of Ballinamuck during the 1798 rebellion in which 150–300 rebels were killed.

Over time the school ceased functioning as a hospital but still retained this title within its name. Operating as an all-boys school for 200 years, it became co-educational in 1969 when it was amalgamated with the Preston School from Navan which was established by John Preston in 1686. This connection is reflected in the name of a newer classroom block, The Preston Building.

In September 2022, the High Court ordered the jailing of a suspended teacher, Enoch Burke, for refusing to comply with a court order preventing him from attending the school. This followed his rejection of disciplinary procedures after reputedly interrupting school business to object to its guidelines on addressing transgender students. After a disciplinary hearing in January 2023, Burke was dismissed from his role at the school.

== Teaching ==
The school caters for approximately 400 students. While many of the school's students are boarders, a number of day pupils also attend the school. As the diocesan secondary school of the Diocese of Meath and Kildare, Wilson's Hospital School operates under a Church of Ireland ethos.

The school operates a five-day boarding week and teaching schedule. Before the COVID-19 pandemic, there was a seven-day boarding week which allowed boarders the option of returning home at weekends or remaining at the school to avail of the weekend activity programmes. Academically, the school offers a range of subjects up to higher Leaving Certificate standard.

== Sport ==
Wilson's Hospital fields schoolboy rugby teams in "Section A" of the Leinster Branch's schools competitions. Former sportspeople, associated with the school, include Andrew Thompson and Joe Schmidt (who coached at the school in the 1990s).

The school also fields hockey teams, and has a "partnership" with Mullingar Hockey Club.

== Notable people ==
- Enoch Burke, former teacher
- James Kavanagh, media personality
- Homan Potterton, attended the Preston School in Navan which was later to become Wilson's Hospital
- Joe Schmidt, former rugby coach at the school
- Andrew Thompson, rugby player and former student
