= Homan Potterton =

Irish art historian and writer (1946–2020)

Homan Franklyn Potterton (9 May 1946 – 8 December 2020) was an art historian and writer who was director of the National Gallery of Ireland, 1980-88. At 33, he was the youngest ever director of the gallery.

Potterton was from Rathcormick, near Trim, County Meath, Ireland, where the Potterton family had lived since the 17th century. He was educated at Preston School, Navan and at Trinity College Dublin, followed by post-graduate studies in art history at the University of Edinburgh.

Potterton was from 1974–80 an assistant keeper, curator, at the National Gallery, London. He was editor of Irish Arts Review, 1993-2002. Potterton wrote several art books and catalogues: Andrew O'Connor, Sculptor (1974); Irish Church Monuments, 1570-1880 (1975); A Guide to the National Gallery (1976); The National Gallery, London (1976); Reynolds & Gainsborough: Themes & Painters in the National Gallery (1976); Pageant and Panorama: the Elegant World of Canaletto (1978); (jointly) Irish Art and Architecture (1978);Venetian Seventeenth Century Painting (1979); Dutch 17th and 18th Century Paintings in the National Gallery of Ireland: a Complete Catalogue (1986).

Potterton's memoir of growing up in Ireland in the 1950s is Rathcormick: a Childhood Recalled (2001). A second, Who Do I Think I Am? A Memoir (2017), brings the story up to his retirement at the age of 42. The title derives from a poem, The National Gallery Restaurant by Paul Durcan the last line of which is "Who does Homan Potterton think he is-Homan Potterton?" His novel, Knockfane, was published in 2019.

In his time in the National Gallery of Ireland Potterton oversaw the production of the first ever catalogues of the Gallery's collections. He was also responsible for persuading Sir Alfred and Lady Beit to leave seventeen paintings, the cream of the Beit Collection, to the Gallery.

Potterton was an honorary member of the Royal Hibernian Academy.

Potterton died in London of cancer at the age of 74.

== References and sources ==
Notes

Sources

- Who's Who (A & C Black, London); Peter Somerville Large, 1854-2004: the Story of the National Gallery of Ireland (2004), pp. 398–421; Vera Ryan, Movers and Shapers: Irish Visual Art, 1940-2006 (2006), pp. 173–201.
