= IQ Rugby =

Rugby union player pathway

Irish Exiles
- Union: Irish Rugby Football Union
- Founded: 1989
- League: IRFU Interprovincial Championship

Official website
- iqrugby.com

IQ Rugby is a programme within the Irish Rugby Football Union (IRFU) to support rugby union players within the Irish diaspora, especially in Great Britain. It was established in 2017 within the high performance pathway for identifying promising young players, as a successor to the Irish Exiles programme begun in 1989. The name IQ stands for "Irish Qualified", meaning qualified under international rugby union eligibility rules to play for Ireland teams, including the men's, women's, men's sevens, and women's sevens.

In the 1990s, an Irish Exiles representative team played in the IRFU Interprovincial Championship against the four domestic provincial selections (Ulster, Leinster, Munster and Connacht). This ended after professionalisation, when the four domestic provinces became full-time professional teams rather than selections from amateur club sides. Exiles teams at underage level continued to play against the provinces and others into the 2010s; an under-19 IQ Rugby Team tours Ireland annually playing under-19 provincial teams.

== History ==
=== Early years ===
The Irish Exiles organisation was originally established as an IRFU subcommittee by Tom Kiernan in 1989 following a meeting in London. The aim of the Irish Exiles was to give Irish diaspora players wishing to represent the Ireland national rugby union team the opportunity to play for a representative team. The Irish Exiles subsequently became a formal sub-committee of the Irish Rugby Football Union. Kiernan became the first chairman of the Exiles organisation. His successors included Barry O'Driscoll. The Exiles would eventually become a full branch of the IRFU.

In addition to establishing a senior representative team, the Exiles also established under 21 and student teams. During their first two seasons the Exiles played friendlies against Ulster at Ravenhill and a Welsh Exiles XV. The first senior XV coach was Ken Kennedy. An under 21/student team also played the Ireland U21s at the London Irish ground in Sunbury-on-Thames. During the 1992–93 season an Irish Exiles XV also played an away friendly against the Basque Country national rugby union team.

=== IRFU Interprovincial Championship ===
Between 1992 and 1993 and 1995–96 the Irish Exiles entered the IRFU Interprovincial Championship. Before this Irish diaspora players, including Jim Staples, Simon Geoghegan and John O'Driscoll were usually invited to represent Connacht in the championship. Staples and Geoghegan subsequently represented the Exiles and O'Driscoll coached the team. Other Ireland internationals to represent the Exiles in the championship included David Curtis, Gary Halpin and Rob Saunders. Mat Keenan, a Western Samoa international also played for the Exiles in the competition.

== Current Squad ==
IQ Rugby Squad - Ireland Provincial Tour 2026
Name	Club
Albie Robinson	(United Arab Emirates) JESS Dubai
Alexander Evans	(Ireland) Clongowes Wood College
Ben Georgiou	(England) Wellington College
Ben Morrissy	(England) Solihull School
Ben McMahon	(England) Trent College
Benjamin Patterson	(England) St Joseph's College
Callum McGee	(Scotland) Glenalmond College
Charles Shortall	(France) Rugby Club Massey
Conor Mead	(England) Abingdon School
Daniel Zimmern	(England) Whitgift School
Elliot Young	(Wales) Haberdashers Monmouth School
Eoghan Duncan	(Scotland) Marr RFC
Fergus Millar	(England) Ipswich School
Freddie Galitzine-Scott	(England) Sedbergh School
George Ravenscroft	(England) Henley College
Henry Tanner	(England) Exeter College
Heryck Gallimore	(England) Taunton School
Jack Moore	(Ireland) Belvedere College
Jack Saxton	(England) Taunton School
Michael Keenan	(England) St Albans School
Ronan Perkins	(England) Bedford Modern School
Rory Stacey	(England) St Bede's Bristol
Seán Smyth	(England) Dulwich College
Tom Ravenscroft	(England) Berkhamsted School
Will Kenny	(Scotland) Glenalmond College

=== Current management ===
Ross Finlay (Team Manager), Frank Taggart (Head Coach), John Clarke (Assistant Coach), Jordan Annett (Assistant Coach), Nathan Briganti (Team Physio), Darragh Williams (Athletic Development Coach), Patrick Hennessy (Team Logistics), Kevin Maggs (IQ Rugby Talent Coach), Steve McGinnis (IQ Rugby Talent Coach) and Lindsey Wordley (IQ Rugby Administrator).

== Interprovincial Championship Record (1992–1996) ==
Against	Played†	Won	Drawn	Lost	% Won	For	Aga	Diff
Connacht	4	4	0	0	100%	121	55	+66
Leinster	4	0	0	4	0%	66	91	–25
Munster	4	1	0	3	25%	60	113	–53
Ulster	4	0	0	4	0%	35	108	–73
Total	16	5	0	11	31.25%	282	367	–85

†Matches were played as part of the Irish Interprovincial Rugby Championship. (Note: Table based results in the Irish rugby team history archive https://www.irishrugby.ie/irfu/history/archived-team-history/)
Correct as of 9 February 2021.

== Academy ==
The Irish Exiles operates as a scouting and recruitment programme for Irish diaspora players interested in playing for the Ireland national rugby union team, the Ireland women's national rugby union team, the Ireland national rugby sevens team and the Ireland women's national rugby sevens team. In addition to producing nearly thirty Ireland men's internationals, the Exiles programme has also produced three British and Irish Lions – Simon Easterby, Rob Henderson and Nick Popplewell. A number of Irish Exiles players have "slipped through the net" and have subsequently gone on to play for the England national rugby union team. These include Kieran Brookes, Paul Doran-Jones and Shane Geraghty. Recent graduates of the programme include Rhys Ruddock and Kieran Marmion.

== Women's team ==
The Irish Exiles also field a women's rugby union team. A number of prominent members of the Ireland women's national rugby union team have progressed through the Exiles programme. These include Sophie Spence and Claire Molloy, Kerrie-Ann Craddock, Leigh Dargan

== Notable Current & former players ==
(British & Irish Lions) British and Irish Lions

- Finlay Bealham
- Tom Court
- Simon Easterby
- Mack Hansen
- Rob Henderson
- Andy Mulligan
- Nick Popplewell

Ireland internationals

- Finlay Bealham
- Michael Bent
- Justin Bishop
- Shayne Bolton
- Isaac Boss
- Paul Burke
- Billy Burns
- Kieran Campbell
- Tom Court
- David Curtis
- Guy Easterby
- Simon Easterby
- David Erskine
- Declan Fitzpatrick
- Justin Fitzpatrick
- Simon Geoghegan
- Mike Haley
- Gary Halpin
- Mack Hansen
- Rob Henderson
- Rob Herring
- Kevin Maggs
- Kieran Marmion
- Simon Mason
- Sean McCahill
- Mike McCarthy
- Matt Mostyn
- Andy Mulligan
- Mike Mullins
- Ross Nesdale
- Dion O'Cuinneagain
- Dylan O'Grady
- Nick Popplewell
- Sean Reidy
- Rhys Ruddock
- Rob Saunders
- Chris Saverimutto
- Jim Staples
- Kieran Treadwell
- Dan Tuohy

Ireland A / XV / Wolfhounds internationals

- Sam Crean
- Adrian Flavin
- Antoine Frisch
- Sean Jansen
- Dan Kelly
- Andi Kyriacou
- Liam Mooney
- Ed O'Donoghue
- Byron Ralston

Emerging Ireland internationals

- Chay Mullins

Ireland U20s Internationals

- Rynard Gordon
- Wilhelm de Klerk
- Lorcan McLoughlin
- Josh Neill
- Paddy Woods

Ireland sevens internationals

- Richard Briggs
- Mark Bruce
- Kieran Campbell
- Harry McNulty
- Bryan Mollen
- Chay Mullins
- Aaron O'Sullivan
- Jon Skurr

Ireland women internationals

- Lynne Cantwell
- Hannah Casey
- Kerrie-Ann Craddock
- Leigh Dargan
- Lauren Day
- Sarah Mimnagh
- Claire Molloy
- Larissa Muldoon
- Jackie Shiels
- Sophie Spence
- Megan Williams

Ireland women sevens internationals

- Sophie Spence

England internationals

- Kieran Brookes
- Paul Doran-Jones
- Shane Geraghty

England Saxons

- Declan Danaher
- George McGuigan

France international

- Antoine Frisch

Western Samoa international

- Mat Keenan

== Notable former coaches ==
- Ken Kennedy
- John O'Driscoll

== Similar teams ==
- London Irish: rugby union club founded by members of the Irish diaspora. This club is sometimes referred to as The Exiles or The Irish Exiles.
- Scottish Exiles (rugby union): a rugby union representative team featuring Scottish diaspora players.
