= Ciaran Scally =

Irish rugby union player

Ciaran Scally is a retired Irish rugby union scrum-half. He played for Blackrock College, UCD, Leinster and also won four caps for Ireland from 1998 to 1999. A knee injury ended his career in 1999 at the age of just 21.
