= Kenny Smith (rugby union) =

Irish rugby union player

- Born: Ireland

Rugby union career
- Position: Wing
Amateur team(s)
Years	Team	Apps	(Points)
- Garryowen
Senior career
Years	Team	Apps	(Points)
c.1992–1998	Munster	4+	((40+))

Kenny Smith is an Irish former rugby union player.

== Career ==
Smith was peculiar for his time in that his was a goal-kicking winger. He was a key member of the Garryowen team, coached by Murray Kidd, that won the All-Ireland League in 1992 and 1994, and he started both of Munster's fixtures in the first Heineken Cup in 1995, though by 1996 he had been replaced in the team by Dominic Crotty.
