= Brian Toland =

- Born: 24 March 1971 (age 55) Cork, Ireland
- Height: 1.91 m (6 ft 3 in)
- Weight: 114 kg (18.0 st; 251 lb)
- Notable relative: Liam Toland (brother)

Rugby union career
- Position(s): Number 8, Flanker
Amateur team(s)
Years	Team	Apps	(Points)
- Old Crescent
Senior career
Years	Team	Apps	(Points)
1995	Munster	5	(0)

Brian Toland is an Irish former rugby union player.

== Career ==
Toland's played senior rugby for amateur side Old Crescent in the All-Ireland League, and he enjoyed a brief spell at provincial level with Munster in 1995, featuring in both of the provinces first ever fixtures in the Heineken Cup.
