= Gary Halpin =

Irish rugby union player (1966–2021)

- Born: Garett Francis Halpin; 14 February 1966 Dublin, Ireland
- Died: 23 February 2021 (aged 55)
- Height: 183 cm (6 ft 0 in)
- Weight: 111 kg (245 lb)
- School: Rockwell College
- University: Manhattan College

Rugby union career
- Position: Prop
Senior career
Years	Team	Apps	(Points)
1991–1998	London Irish	122	
1998–1999	Harlequins	23	(10)
Provincial / State sides
Years	Team	Apps	(Points)
1998–2001	Leinster		
International career
Years	Team	Apps	(Points)
1990–1995	Ireland	11	(5)

Gary Halpin (14 February 1966 – 23 February 2021) was an Irish rugby union international player and champion hammer thrower. He played as a prop for Wanderers F.C., Leinster, London Irish, Harlequins and Ireland. He scored a try against New Zealand at the 1995 Rugby World Cup and subsequently celebrated with an obscene gesture directed at the All Blacks.

== Early life ==
Halpin was born in Dublin on 14 February 1966. He attended Rockwell College, where he played schools rugby. In 1984 Halpin was part of the Irish Schools XV being part of the team that beat Scotland 13-26 and two weeks later defeated England 15–7 at Ravenhill in Belfast, only the second time that Ireland had beaten the English U18 Schools team. Will Carling led the team out that day. He was subsequently awarded a scholarship to Manhattan College. There, he threw the hammer on the Jasper's track team, and set college and meet records at the Intercollegiate Association of Amateur Athletes of America. He won the 35lb weight hammer throw at the 1988 NCAA Division I Indoor Track and Field Championships and received All-American honors four times for throwing. He also represented Ireland in the hammer throw at the 1987 World Championships in Athletics in Rome.

== Career ==
After graduating from Manhattan College in 1988, Halpin went back to Ireland the following year and began his club rugby career at Wanderers F.C. He was part of the team that won the Leinster Senior Cup in 1990. He signed for London Irish in 1991, and made 122 first team appearances for them over the next seven years. During his final season with the team, Halpin appeared in 18 matches but did not score any points. He also played provincial rugby for the Irish Exiles during this time. He proceeded to play for Harlequins from 1998 to 1999; in his only season with them, he scored 10 points in 23 games. He moved back to Ireland and played for Leinster from 1998 until 2001.

Halpin played for the Ireland team from 1990 to 1995, winning 11 caps. He made his debut in January 1990 against England in a 23–0 defeat at Twickenham. He was part of the Ireland squad at the 1991 Rugby World Cup and the 1995 Rugby World Cup. He notably scored one try against New Zealand during the pool stage of the latter tournament and celebrated by jogging backwards and flashing both middle fingers at the All Blacks. He later expressed regret for doing this in 2019, adding how he did this in retaliation to Sean Fitzpatrick – who set the All Blacks appearance record that same game – provoking the Irish side by calling them Paddies. Halpin played his final game with the national team on 10 June 1995, when Ireland lost to France in the quarter-finals of the World Cup.

== Later life ==
After retiring from rugby, Halpin became a teacher and taught for two decades at St George's College, Weybridge, Christ College, Brecon, and The Oratory School near Reading. He also worked at Newlands prep school teaching rugby and house master at Newlands manor school. He was enshrined into the London Irish Hall of Fame in 2012. He later returned to Ireland in 2015 and coached Kilkenny RFC (who were previously coached by his father Tom). He served as head of boarding at Cistercian College, Roscrea. He resided at the school with his wife, Carol, who was also employed there. Together, they had three children. Halpin died suddenly on 23 February 2021, at the age of 55.
