= Niall O'Donovan =

Irish rugby union coach

- Born: Limerick, Ireland
- Notable relative: Maeve O'Donovan (daughter)

Rugby union career
- Position: Number 8
Amateur team(s)
| Years | Team | Apps | (Points) |
- Shannon
Senior career
| Years | Team | Apps | (Points) |
- Munster
Coaching career
- Years: Team
- 19??–1996: Shannon (Head coach)
- 1996–1997: Shannon (Director of rugby)
- 1997–2001: Munster (Assistant coach)
- 2001–2008: Ireland (Forwards coach)
- 2008–2012: Ireland A (Assistant coach)
- 2012: Munster A (Forwards coach/manager)
- 2012–present: Munster (Team manager)

Niall O'Donovan is an Irish rugby union coach who is currently manager of Munster, having previously coached Shannon, Ireland A and Ireland.

== Career ==
O'Donovan spent his entire playing career with Shannon, representing the Limerick club for fifteen seasons and earning caps for Munster during eight of those seasons. After retiring from playing, he entered coaching and was head coach of the famous Shannon team that won the All-Ireland League in 1994, 1995 and 1996, and was director of rugby when the club completed their four-in-a-row in 1997. The team included the likes of Mick Galwey and Anthony Foley, who would go on to become Munster legends.

Ahead of the 1997–98 season, O'Donovan joined the Munster coaching setup as an assistant coach alongside former head coach Jerry Holland and new head coach John Bevan. When Bevan left his role after just one season and Declan Kidney joined the province as head coach, O'Donovan was retained as an assistant coach, staying with the province until he was appointed as full-time forwards coach for the Irish national team under Eddie O'Sullivan in December 2001.

After O'Sullivan was sacked following the 2008 Six Nations Championship and Declan Kidney took over as Ireland head coach, O'Donovan was appointed as an assistant coach to Michael Bradley with Ireland A, who compete a level below the senior national team.

He was team manager and forwards coach for the Munster A team that won the 2011–12 British and Irish Cup and, in June 2012, was appointed as team manager for Munster, replacing Shaun Payne, who had returned to South Africa. O'Donovan signed a three-year contract extension in June 2017, ensuring he will continue his long association with the province until at least June 2020.

== Honours (as coach) ==
=== Shannon ===
- All-Ireland League:
  - Winner (4): 1994–95, 1995–96, 1996–97, 1997–98

=== Munster ===
- IRFU Interprovincial Championship:
  - Winner (3): 1998–99, 1999–2000, 2000–01

=== Ireland ===
- Triple Crown:
  - Winner (3): 2004, 2006, 2007

=== Ireland A ===
- Churchill Cup:
  - Winner (1): 2009

=== Munster A ===
- British and Irish Cup:
  - Winner (1): 2011–12
