= Kelvin Leahy =

Irish rugby union player

- Full name: Kelvin Tremaine Leahy
- Born: 1 September 1965 (age 61) Cork, Ireland
- Notable relative: Mick Leahy (father)

Rugby union career
- Position: Flanker
International career
Years	Team	Apps	(Points)
1992	Ireland	1	(0)

Kelvin Tremaine Leahy (born 1 September 1965) is an Irish former rugby union international.

Born in Cork, Leahy attended Crescent College and captained them to the Munster Schools Senior Cup title in 1983. His brothers, Colin, Ross and Shane were also cup winners with the school. Their father Mick earned one Ireland cap.

Leahy, a flanker, was captain of Combined Provinces U20s and in 1989 made his provincial debut for Leinster. He played his club rugby in Dublin for Wanderers, which he captained to the Leinster Cup and League double in 1990.

In 1992, Leahy was a member of the Ireland squad for the tour of New Zealand. He gained his solitary Ireland cap in the 1st Test at Carisbrook in Dunedin and had to be replaced at half-time after breaking his fibula.

== See also ==
- List of Ireland national rugby union players
