= Len Dineen =

Irish former rugby union player

Len Dinneen
- Born: 14 December 1966 (age 59) Cork, Ireland
- Height: 1.91 m (6 ft 3 in)
- Weight: 108 kg (17.0 st; 238 lb)

Rugby union career
- Position(s): Lock, Flanker
Amateur team(s)
Years	Team	Apps	(Points)
- Cork Constitution
Senior career
Years	Team	Apps	(Points)
c.1990s–1996	Munster	7	(0)
International career
Years	Team	Apps	(Points)
1984–1985	Ireland Schools		
–	Ireland A		

Len Dineen (born 14 December 1966) is an Irish former rugby union player.

== Career ==
The son of famous rugby commentator Len Dinneen Sr, known as the "Voice of Rugby" in Ireland, Dinneen Jr played lock for Ireland Schools between 1984 and 1985, before joining Cork Constitution and winning the inaugural All-Ireland League with the club in 1991, and regularly representing Munster during the 1990s. He also represented Ireland A, the team just below the senior national team, and joined Old Crescent in 1996.

Dinneen Jr's brothers also played rugby; Gareth won two Munster Schools Rugby Senior Cup medals with Crescent College; David won the tournament with St Munchin's College and Kevin won a Connacht Senior Cup with UCG. His son, Jack, joined the Connacht academy ahead of the 2012–13 season, and made his debut against Munster in April 2014.
