= Jean-Marc Souverbie =

French rugby union player (born 1975)

- Born: Jean-Marc Souverbie; 9 April 1975 (age 51) Pau, France
- Height: 1.75 m (5 ft 9 in)
- Weight: 78 kg (12 st 4 lb)

Rugby union career
- Position: Fullback
Senior career
Years	Team	Apps	(Points)
-1997	Section Paloise		
1997-2001	Bègles		
2001-2003	USAP		
2003-2007	Section Paloise		
2007-	US Morlaàs		
International career
Years	Team	Apps	(Points)
2000	France	1	(5)

Jean-Marc Souverbie (born 9 April 1975 in Pau, France) is a French rugby union footballer who plays for US Morlaàs in the Fédérale 1. His usual position is at a Fullback. Prior to joining US Morlaàs he played for Section Paloise, Bègles and USA Perpignan. He made his debut for France on 28 May 2000 against Romania.

== Honours ==
- Finalist of Heineken Cup with USA Perpignan in 2003
- Finalist of European Challenge Cup, 2005 with Section Paloise against Sale Sharks
