= Niall Woods =

Irish rugby union player

- Born: 21 June 1971 (age 55)
- Height: 6 ft 0 in (1.83 m)
- Weight: 181 lb (82 kg; 12.9 st)

Rugby union career
- Position: Wing
International career
Years	Team	Apps	(Points)
1994-1999	Ireland	8	(5)
National sevens team
Years	Team		Comps
	Ireland		1993 RWC7's

Niall Woods is a retired Irish rugby footballer. He retired in 2001 having earned 8 caps on the wing for the Irish national team between 1994 and 1999 as well as playing for Blackrock Coll, Dublin University, Leinster, London Irish, Harlequins and Northern Suburbs.
