= Alan McGowan (Australian footballer) =

Australian rules footballer (1926–2019)

Allan McGowan
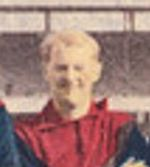

Personal information
- Full name: Allan James McGowan
- Born: 7 August 1926
- Died: 4 October 2019 (aged 93); Hornsby, New South Wales
- Original team: Glenelg
- Height: 183 cm (6 ft 0 in)
- Weight: 85 kg (187 lb)

Playing career^{1}
Years	Club	Games (Goals)
1948–1950	Melbourne	22 (7)
1951	Collingwood	1 (0)
Total		23 (7)
- ^{1} Playing statistics correct to the end of 1951.

Allan James McGowan (7 August 1926 − 4 October 2019) was an Australian rules footballer who played for the Melbourne Football Club and Collingwood Football Club in the Victorian Football League (VFL).
