= Kevin Nowlan (rugby union) =

Irish rugby union player

- Full name: Kevin William Nowlan
- Born: 26 June 1971 (age 55) Dublin, Ireland
- Height: 6 ft 2 in (188 cm)
- Weight: 182 lb (83 kg)

Rugby union career
- Position: Fullback
International career
Years	Team	Apps	(Points)
1997	Ireland	3	(10)

Kevin William Nowlan (born 26 June 1971) is an Irish businessman and former rugby union international.

Nowlan, a Dublin native, attended St Mary's College and played his provincial rugby for Leinster.

In 1997, Nowlan was capped three times for Ireland as a fullback and made his debut against New Zealand at Lansdowne Road. He scored two tries against Canada in his second Test match.

Nowlan co-founded Hibernia Real Estate Group with his father.

== See also ==
- List of Ireland national rugby union players
