= Ken Kennedy (rugby union) =

Irish rugby union player (1941–2022)

- Born: 10 May 1941 Rochester, Kent, England
- Died: 14 July 2022 (aged 81)

Rugby union career
- Position: Hooker
International career
Years	Team	Apps	(Points)
1965–1975	Ireland	45	(0)
1966	British and Irish Lions	4	(3)

Kenneth William Kennedy (10 May 1941 ‐ 14 July 2022) was an Irish rugby union player who played hooker for Ireland and the British and Irish Lions.

He was born in Rochester, Kent, England, the son of a Royal Navy doctor, Ken Senior, from Holywood, County Down, and his wife Connie. After his parents brought the family to their native Northern Ireland, Kennedy was brought up in Holywood with his two siblings and attended Campbell College in Belfast, where he started playing rugby. He studied medicine at Queen's University Belfast and played for Queen's University RFC and Belfast club CIYMS.

Kennedy won his first cap for Ireland in 1965 and went on to win 45 caps over the next decade, a world record at the time. He was selected for the 1966 British Lions tour to Australia and New Zealand where he played in four Tests and in an international victory in Canada. Injured for the 1968 British Lions tour to South Africa, he was a member of the 1974 British Lions tour to South Africa, acting as the squad's unofficial medical officer. He undertook postgraduate study in geriatric medicine at Guy's Hospital, which led to him joining London Irish in 1968. Kennedy played his club rugby with London Irish until 1980, captaining the side from 1976 to 1979.

Kennedy was a fitness fanatic and a technical innovator known for his powerful scrummaging. Irish and Lions colleague Stewart McKinney considered him "a wonderful hooker, the best of our day". He was equally adept in the loose and very mobile and good with ball in hand.

On account of being his country's first-choice hooker for over a decade, he was inducted into the Irish Rugby Hall of Fame in 2007.

Outside rugby, Kennedy worked as an orthopaedic physician at St. Stephen's Hospital and St Mary Abbots Hospital and was Medical Director of Rehabilitation at the Royal Star and Garter Hospital until 2003, after which he set up a sports injury clinic.

Ken Kennedy died peacefully during a holiday in Connemara, County Galway. He had a wife, Farida, and two children, Patrick and Alexander.
