= Dan Larkin =

- Born: Ireland
- School: St. Munchins College

Rugby union career
- Position(s): Centre, Fly-half
Amateur team(s)
Years	Team	Apps	(Points)
- Garryowen
–	Bective Rangers		
Senior career
Years	Team	Apps	(Points)
c.1980s–1995	Munster	2	(0)

Dan Larkin is an Irish former rugby union player.

== Career ==
Larkin played in the Munster team that lost 31–9 to New Zealand in 1989, but was on the winning side when Munster beat the then-world champions Australia in 1992. Larkin was a veteran of the team by the time the Heineken Cup was formed in 1995, featuring in both of the provinces first fixtures in the competition.

He represented Limerick club Garryowen, winning All-Ireland League titles in 1992 and 1994. He also represented Dublin club Bective Rangers.
