= Chris Saverimutto =

Irish rugby union player

- Full name: Christian Lingard Saverimutto
- Born: 8 August 1971 (age 55) Wallasey, England
- Height: 5 ft 8 in (173 cm)

Rugby union career
- Position: Scrum-half
International career
Years	Team	Apps	(Points)
1995–96	Ireland	3	(0)

Christian Lingard Saverimutto (born 8 August 1971) is an English-born former rugby union international for Ireland.

Saverimutto was born and raised in Merseyside, England. His father is Sri Lankan and his maternal grandparents were from Dublin, Ireland. He attended St Anselm's College, Birkenhead. At colts level, Saverimutto had featured in an England side, but ended up switching allegiances to Ireland on the basis on his ancestry.

A Sale player, Saverimutto made his Test debut for Ireland in 1995 as a scrum-half against Fiji at Lansdowne Road, which was Ireland's first match in the fully-professional era. In 1996, he played a Test against the United States in Atlanta, followed by the Five Nations fixture against Scotland, with a knee injury then curtailing his progress.

Saverimutto is now a chartered surveyor.

== See also ==
- List of Ireland national rugby union players
