= Andrew Thompson (rugby union) =

- Born: 9 March 1974 (age 52) Borris-in-Ossory, Ireland
- Height: 1.85 m (6 ft 1 in)
- Weight: 89 kg (14.0 st; 196 lb)

Rugby union career
- Position(s): Wing, Centre, Fly-half, Fullback
Amateur team(s)
Years	Team	Apps	(Points)
- Shannon
Senior career
Years	Team	Apps	(Points)
1995–1999	Munster	8	(12)
–	Stade Montchaninois		
–	Bedford		

Andrew Thompson (born 9 March 1974) is an Irish former rugby union player.

== Career ==
Born in Borris-in-Ossory, County Laois, Thompson attended Wilson's Hospital School and caught the attention of Limerick club Shannon, who invited him to join their under-18s on a tour of Wales in 1991. Promotion to Shannon's senior team quickly followed, and he was one of only three players who played in all 48 games of Shannon's famous four-in-a-row of All-Ireland League titles between 1994 and 1998.

He featured for Munster during the early years of professionalism, at a time when Irish rugby was slow on the uptake, and Thompson joined French club Stade Montchaninois and English club Bedford briefly after leaving Munster in 1999, before returning to Shannon and being appointed captain ahead of the 2000–01 season. Four more All-Ireland League titles followed for Thompson and Shannon, before he finally retired from rugby in 2011. Since 1998, Thompson has also been a director at engineering firm AECOM.

== Honours ==
=== Shannon ===
- All-Ireland League Division 1A:
  - Winner (9): 1994–95, 1995–96, 1996–97, 1997–98, 2001–02, 2003–04, 2004–05, 2005–06, 2008–09
- Munster Senior League:
  - Winner (3): 2001–02, 2002–03, 2004–05
- Munster Senior Cup:
  - Winner (12): 1991, 1992, 1996, 1998, 2000, 2001, 2002, 2003, 2004, 2005, 2006, 2008
