= Pat Murray (rugby union) =

- Born: Patrick Vincent Murray; 12 October 1963 (age 63) Limerick, Ireland
- Height: 1.85 m (6 ft 1 in)
- Weight: 87 kg (13.7 st; 192 lb)

Rugby union career
- Position: Fullback
Amateur team(s)
| Years | Team | Apps | (Points) |
- Shannon
Senior career
| Years | Team | Apps | (Points) |
| 1984–1996 | Munster | 11+ | (5+) |

Patrick Vincent Murray (born 12 October 1963) is an Irish former rugby union player and coach.

== Career ==
Born just ten minutes from Thomond Park, Murray played for Munster between 1984 and 1996, and was captain of the province when they made their European debut during the 1995–96 Heineken Cup, scoring a late try to secure a 17–13 win against Swansea and Munster's first ever win in the competition. His last appearance for Munster was against London Wasps.

Murray was also a Shannon stalwart, captaining the side that won a hat-trick of All-Ireland League between 1994 and 1997, and then coaching the parishmen as they completed their famous four-in-a-row in 1998, a side that was also coached by another Shannon legend, Niall O'Donovan, and featured future legends Mick Galwey and Anthony Foley. Despite his performances for Shannon and Munster, Murray never won any caps for Ireland, despite many feeling that he was the best fullback in the country.
