= Shane Leahy =

Irish rugby union player

- Born: 27 November 1971 (age 54) Ireland
- Height: 1.96 m (6 ft 5 in)
- Weight: 106 kg (16.7 st; 234 lb)

Rugby union career
- Position: Lock
Amateur team(s)
Years	Team	Apps	(Points)
- Lansdowne
–	Garryowen		
Senior career
Years	Team	Apps	(Points)
1996	Connacht	5	(5)
1997–1999	Munster	17	(0)
International career
Years	Team	Apps	(Points)
1996	Ireland A	1	(0)

Shane Leahy (born 27 November 1971) is an Irish former rugby union player.

== Career ==
Leahy attended Crescent College in Limerick and won Munster Schools Rugby Senior Cup titles in 1989 and 1990. His father, Mick, earned one cap for Ireland against Wales during the 1964 Five Nations Championship, whilst older brother Kelvin also earned a single cap for Ireland against New Zealand in 1992, and brothers Shane and Ross also won Munster Schools Rugby Senior Cup titles with Crescent College.

He played for Dublin club Lansdowne in the All-Ireland League, but work took Leahy back to Limerick, where he joined Garryowen. He played for Ireland A against South Africa A in November 1996, and made five appearances for Connacht during the 1996–97 Challenge Cup, before joining Munster ahead of the 1997–98 season and making 17 appearances for the province between 1997 and 1999. After rugby, Leahy became CEO of Oxygen8.
