= Aidan O'Halloran =

- Born: Limerick, Ireland

Rugby union career
- Position: Fly-half
Amateur team(s)
Years	Team	Apps	(Points)
- Young Munster
Senior career
Years	Team	Apps	(Points)
1996	Munster	2	(27)

Aidan O'Halloran is an Irish former rugby union player.

== Career ==
In his first season of senior rugby, O'Halloran played fly-half for Young Munster as they won the 1992–93 All-Ireland League. He would go on to win two caps for Munster in 1996, against Samoa and Connacht.
