= Paul Cunningham (rugby union) =

Irish rugby union player

- Born: 1966/1967 Limerick, Ireland
- School: St Michael's College
- University: Trinity College Dublin

Rugby union career
- Position: Hooker
Amateur team(s)
Years	Team	Apps	(Points)
- Garryowen
Senior career
Years	Team	Apps	(Points)
1995–1997	Munster	8	(0)

Paul Cunningham is an Irish former rugby union player and coach.

== Early life ==
Cunningham was born in Limerick before his family moved to Deansgrange, Dublin, though the family originally hailed from Cork and had connections with amateur club Cork Constitution. He first began playing rugby with St Michael's College.

== Career ==
He joined Old Belvedere, who were coached by Ireland legend Ollie Campbell at the time, before joining Dublin University, the rugby club of Trinity College, which Cunningham attended at the time.

In 1992, Cunningham's work took him to Dooradoyle, Limerick, and he joined Garryowen, for whom his father had also played for, and was pressed into the first XV after Keith Wood suffered a shoulder injury. He remained in the team throughout the 1992–93 season and won the Munster Senior Cup against Limerick rivals and newly crowned All-Ireland League champions Young Munster. With Wood focusing on his Ireland commitments for the 1995 Rugby World Cup, Cunningham won a second Munster Senior Cup in 1994–95, and an injury to Terry Kingston saw him earn the first of eight caps for Munster in 1995.

His performances for Munster saw Cunningham earn selection for the Ireland A squad and a contract offer from the IRFU, but three months into the contract he suffered a popped disc which hampered his career. Despite playing in Munster's interprovincial games in 1996–97, he was then dropped, though continued to play for Garryowen.

As well as rugby, Cunningham is also a qualified chartered accountant and financial analyst. He is also a rugby union coach, having been in charge of the Ireland Clubs team, which selects from the amateur All-Ireland League, and, from 2013 to 2017, was head coach of Old Belvedere.
