= Paul Flavin =

Irish rugby union player

- Born: 4 April 1972 (age 54) Dublin, Ireland
- Height: 6 ft 0 in (183 cm)
- Weight: 224 lb (102 kg)

Rugby union career
- Position: Prop
International career
Years	Team	Apps	(Points)
1997	Ireland	2	(0)

Paul Flavin (born 4 April 1972) is an Irish former rugby union international.

Flavin was born in Dublin and attended Blackrock College.

A prop, Flavin was capped twice for Ireland during the 1997 Five Nations Championship. He made his debut as a substitute against France at Lansdowne Road with only 11 seconds remaining. For his next match however, against Scotland at Murrayfield, he had a place in the starting side, replacing an injured Nick Popplewell.

Flavin played provincial rugby for Connacht and Leinster.

== See also ==
- List of Ireland national rugby union players
