= Henry Hurley =

Irish rugby union player

Henry Hurley is a retired Irish rugby union loose-head prop-forward. Born in Doncaster, he played for Old Wesley RFC, Moseley RFC, Leinster and Ireland. He won 2 caps between 1995 and 1996.

He taught in East Glendalough School, until he moved to Temple Carrig secondary school, then moved to Woodbrook College. He became head coach at the East Glendalough School Rugby Team and led the 2010 Junior Team (JCT) to a victory in a league two divisions ahead of the school standard. Led by captain Fergal Marshall, they went flawlessly to the Junior Developmental Cup and to the Duff Cup, where they ended their streak in the final narrowly losing to Skerries. Having qualified for the Fr. Godfrey Cup, this bullish East Glendalough side faced stern opposition in the form of Roscrea, who were seasoned at this level. The journey ended here as they lost 13–6 in the first round. Henry now coaches Temple Carrig's JCT alongside Mark Crean guiding them to the Fr Godfrey Cup Final and Junior Cup First Round.
