= Liam Toland =

Irish rugby union player

- Born: 18 June 1972 (age 54) Limerick, Ireland
- Height: 1.88 m (6 ft 2 in)
- Weight: 100 kg (16 st; 220 lb)
- Notable relative: Brian Toland (brother)

Rugby union career
- Position(s): Flanker, Number 8
Amateur team(s)
| Years | Team | Apps | (Points) |
- Old Crescent
Senior career
| Years | Team | Apps | (Points) |
| 1995–1996 | Munster | 6 | (15) |
| 1999–2003 | Leinster | 34 | (5) |
- Correct as of 21 December 2020

Liam Toland (born 18 June 1972) is an Irish former rugby union player and current analyst.

== Career ==
Toland's Munster career began in the mid-1990s, but a career threatening injury sustained whilst playing in the All-Ireland League with Old Crescent in 1997 forced him to take time out of the game, until Mike Ruddock brought him to Leinster in 1999, for whom Toland continued to represent until 2003.

Aside from rugby, Toland was also a captain in the Irish Defence Forces between 1991 and 2009, a rugby analyst with Setanta Sports, a rugby analyst for the Irish Times, founder and CEO of Tap and Test, and owner of Home Instead Senior Care. In 2001, Toland and Peter McKenna set up the Irish Rugby Union Players Association, with Toland being appointed the organisations inaugural chairman. He left the role in 2003 to make way for a full-time appointment.
