= Brian Begley (rugby union) =

Irish former rugby union player

- Born: 24 September 1973 (age 53) Ireland
- Height: 1.80 m (5 ft 11 in)
- Weight: 86 kg (13.5 st; 190 lb)

Rugby union career
- Position(s): Wing, Fullback
Amateur team(s)
Years	Team	Apps	(Points)
- Old Crescent
Senior career
Years	Team	Apps	(Points)
1996–1998	Munster	6	(58)

Brian Begley (born 24 September 1973) is an Irish former rugby union player.

== Career ==
Begley played for the Ireland Schools team, coached by future Munster and Ireland head coach Declan Kidney, that toured New Zealand in 1992. He joined the Munster setup in the late 1990s, by which time Kidney had become the provinces coach, but, despite scoring 58 points in 6 appearances between 1996 and 1998, professionalism did not seem to suit Begley, and returned to the amateur All-Ireland League with Old Crescent, for whom he played for well into the 2000s.

Begley was also one of Ireland's leading amateur golfers during the 1980s, and he was appointed chief executive of St Margaret's Club in Dublin in 2001.
