= Mike Lynch (rugby union) =

- Born: 22 July 1970 (age 56) Limerick, Ireland
- Height: 1.80 m (5 ft 11 in)
- Weight: 91 kg (14.3 st; 201 lb)

Rugby union career
- Position: Centre
Amateur team(s)
Years	Team	Apps	(Points)
- Young Munster
Senior career
Years	Team	Apps	(Points)
1996–1999	Munster	21	(53)

Mike Lynch is an Irish former rugby union player.

== Career ==
Lynch played club rugby for Young Munster in the All-Ireland League, and was part of the team that lost finals of the Munster Senior Cup to Shannon in 2001 and 2002. He went on the win 21 caps for Munster between 1996 and 1999, scoring 53 points for the province. He was also called up to the senior Ireland squad for the 1998 Five Nations Championship, and despite being on the bench for the game against France he was ultimately never capped by Ireland at senior level. After his playing career, Lynch was a PE teacher at St Clement's Redemptorist College in Limerick, and he was also an assistant coach at Young Munster.
