= Des Clohessy =

Irish former rugby union player

- Born: 4 October 1973 (age 53) Limerick, Ireland
- Height: 1.83 m (6 ft 0 in)
- Weight: 111 kg (17.5 st; 245 lb)
- Notable relative: Peter Clohessy (brother)

Rugby union career
- Position(s): Prop, Number 8, Flanker
Amateur team(s)
Years	Team	Apps	(Points)
- Young Munster
Senior career
Years	Team	Apps	(Points)
1995–1998	Munster	8	(10)

Des Clohessy (born 4 October 1973) is an Irish former rugby union player.

== Career ==
Clohessy played for Young Munster in the All-Ireland League, where he made his name as a blindside flanker and number 8 and was a crucial player in the team that won the inaugural Munster Player Development League in 1996, before being encouraged to switch positions to prop and playing for Munster during their first ever season in the Heineken Cup. He was selected in the Ireland squad that toured South Africa in 1998, alongside older brother Peter, but did not win any international caps.
