= Killian Keane =

Irish rugby union player

Killian Keane is a retired Irish rugby union player. He was born in Skerries, County Dublin, Ireland in August 1971.

== Rugby career ==
As a schoolboy, he was a member of the Skerries Community Games Rugby team which reached the All Ireland Final, losing to Regional (Limerick). He developed to the Skerries first team before being spotted by Frank Hogan who convinced Keane to join Garryowen RFC.

He played at centre for Garryowen and Munster, and also won one cap for Ireland in 1998 as a replacement in a Five Nations match against England at Twickenham.

He is now a managing director at Goldman Sachs.

== Media work ==
Keane has provided co-commentary on United Rugby Championship matches for Setanta Ireland.
