= Kurt McQuilkin =

Ireland international rugby union player

Kurt McQuilkin, originally from New Zealand, is a rugby player who settled in Ireland where he first joined and played for Bective Rangers FC. Playing as an inside center, he later played for and captained Leinster and earned five international caps for Ireland.

== Career ==
When McQuilkin captained Lansdowne two seasons in a row in 1997-98 and 1998–99, he was the first player to captain Lansdowne in successive years since Billy Sutherland, in seasons 1940-41 and 1941–42.

McQuilkin also played professionally for Leinster, where he made 32 appearances, captaining the side to an Irish interprovincial championship in the 1997/98 season, as well as making 5 appearances for the Irish national team.

He went on to be appointed as defence coach for Leinster and was a member of the coaching team under Michael Cheika that guided Leinster to their first European Cup in 2009, with the performance away to Harlequins being considered one of the best defensive displays by a Leinster team in recent history.

McQuilkin left Leinster after the 2009/2010 season, however he returned to the club again as defence coach for the beginning of the 2015/16 season.
