= Sean McCahill =

New Zealand-Irish rugby union player

Sean McCahill (born 1968 in Auckland, New Zealand) is a retired Irish rugby union centre.

McCahill grew up in Auckland and attended St Peter's College where he played rugby. His father was an Irish immigrant who established a profitable road-making and infrastructure business in Auckland, Green and McCahill. Sean McCahill is the younger brother of Bernie McCahill, a former All Black.

== Rugby career ==
McCahill played for Sundays Well, Munster and won one cap for Ireland in 1995.
