= Stephen McIvor =

Irish rugby union player

Stephen McIvor (born 5 February 1969 in Dublin) is a retired Irish rugby union player. He played at scrum-half, primarily for Garryowen and Munster, and also won three caps for Ireland from 1996 to 1997.
