= Neil Francis (rugby union) =

Irish rugby union player

- Full name: Neil Patrick (John) Francis
- Born: 17 March 1964 (age 62) Dublin, Ireland
- Height: 6 ft 6 in (1.98 m)
- Weight: 262 lb (119 kg)

Rugby union career
- Position: lock forward
Amateur team(s)
Years	Team	Apps	(Points)
-1988	Blackrock College		
1988-1989	London Irish		
1989-1993	Blackrock College		
1993-	Old Belvedere		
Provincial / State sides
Years	Team	Apps	(Points)
- Leinster
International career
Years	Team	Apps	(Points)
1987-1996	Ireland	36	(20)
1990	Barbarians	1	(4)

Neil Francis is a retired Irish rugby union lock forward and number eight. He played club rugby for Blackrock College, London Irish, Old Belvedere and provincially for Leinster. Francis also earned 36 caps for Ireland between 1987 and 1996 and competed in three rugby world cups in 1987, 1991 and 1995 respectively.

== Controversy ==
On 16 February 2014, Francis sparked controversy when he said that "gay people do not have any interest in sport" and that "only a tiny percentage are actively involved in professional sports of any kind". The player-turned-pundit was speaking on Newstalk's Off the Ball and when asked by presenter Joe Molloy if he "believed the percentage of gay people involved in sport was lower than the 10 per cent which is the estimate of the general population who are gay", he said he suspected that the percentage was "nowhere near 10 per cent. I would say in the smaller margin of 1 per cent".

In November 2019, he suggested South Africa's win in the Rugby World Cup was "tainted by steroids".

On 23 July 2021, the Irish Independent newspaper terminated his contract, where he had been a columnist, following his remarks on one of their podcasts about British and Irish Lions player Marcus Smith. Francis described Smith, a half-Filipino, as having a "David Beckham haircut and an Oompa Loompa tan". Smith's club, Harlequin F.C., criticised the remarks as "offensive" and "racist". The Lions also criticised the remarks as "offensive". Francis apologised for any offence taken and for the fact that the comments were interpreted differently from what he intended.
