= Peter Clohessy =

Irish rugby union player (born 1966)

- Born: Peter Martin Noel Clohessy; 22 March 1966 (age 60) Limerick, Ireland
- Height: 1.80 m (5 ft 11 in)
- Weight: 106 kg (16.7 st; 234 lb)
- Notable relative: Des Clohessy (brother)

Rugby union career
- Position: Prop
Amateur team(s)
Years	Team	Apps	(Points)
1987–1999	Young Munster		
Senior career
Years	Team	Apps	(Points)
1987–1996	Munster		
1997	Queensland Reds		(0)
1998–2002	Munster	73	(10)
International career
Years	Team	Apps	(Points)
1993–2002	Ireland	54	(20)

Peter Clohessy (born 22 March 1966) is an Irish former rugby union player, who played for Munster, Queensland Reds and Ireland. He played as a prop and was known by his fans as "The Claw". He played most of his career at tighthead prop but later switched to loosehead.

== Munster ==
Clohessy made his Munster debut against Ulster in 1987. He was part of the Munster team that lost 9-8 to Northampton Saints in the 2000 Heineken Cup Final, and he was again on the losing side when Munster lost 15-9 to Leicester Tigers in the 2002 Final. This was also Clohessy's last game for Munster, as he retired at the end of the 2001–02 season.

== Ireland ==
Clohessy made his Ireland debut against France in February 1993, during the 1993 Five Nations Championship. His first try for Ireland came against Australia in June 1994. Clohessy missed the 1995 World Cup, but was selected in Ireland's squad for the 1999 Tournament. He was desperately unlucky not to be selected for the 1993 British Lions tour to New Zealand and had to withdraw from the 1997 tour to South Africa due to injury . His last appearance for Ireland was against France in the 2002 Six Nations Championship.

He gained notoriety for a 26-week ban he was given in 1996 for a stamp to the head of Olivier Roumat during a 1996 Five Nations Championship match in Paris. He had previously served a 10 week ban for stamping at club level.

== Personal life ==
Clohessy formerly owned a pub in Limerick called 'Clohessy's' and an adjoining night club called 'The Sin Bin'. He opened a pub and restaurant Crokers Bar & Restaurant in Murroe, east Limerick. Both of which were closed by the end of 2018.

On 12 February 2025, Clohessy's daughter, Jane Clohessy, was named as part of a 40 woman Ireland squad for the 2025 Women's 6 Nations.
