= Brian Walsh (rugby union) =

- Born: 21 October 1969 (age 57) Cork, Ireland
- Height: 1.85 m (6 ft 1 in)
- Weight: 90 kg (14 st; 200 lb)

Rugby union career
- Position: Centre
Amateur team(s)
| Years | Team | Apps | (Points) |
- Cork Constitution
Senior career
| Years | Team | Apps | (Points) |
| c.1992–1998 | Munster | 22+ | ((25+)) |
Coaching career
- Years: Team
- 1998–2008: Cork Constitution (head coach)
- 2005: Ireland U21 (assistant coach)
- 2008–2009: Ireland Clubs (head coach)
- 2014: Pres, Cork (coach)
- 2014: Cork Con U20
- 2014–2016: Munster (assistant coach)

Brian Walsh (born 21 October 1969) is an Irish former rugby union player and current coach.

== Career ==
Walsh was part of the famous Munster team that beat Australia in 1992. Australia were world champions at the time, having won the 1991 Rugby World Cup. He was also part of the Munster team that began the provinces history in the Heineken Cup, participating in the opening 1995–96 season, before ending his playing career with Munster in 1998. Internationally, Walsh was selected in the Ireland squad that toured Australia in 1994, but he never won any caps.

A proud Corkman, Walsh played for local club Cork Constitution and transitioned into coaching after his playing career, being appointed Con's head coach and leading them to All-Ireland League titles in 1998–98 and 2007–08, and one All-Ireland Cup in 2005–06. In 2005, Walsh also assisted with coaching the Ireland under-21s team, and in 2008 and 2009 he was head coach of the Ireland Clubs team.

He joined the Munster Academy Board in 2013, and coached Presentation Brothers College's team during the 2014 Munster Schools Rugby Senior Cup, as well as Cork Con's under-20s team. When Anthony Foley was appointed the new Munster head coach in 2014, Walsh returned to the province as their backs coach, forming an all-Munster coaching team with Foley, Ian Costello, Jerry Flannery and Mick O'Driscoll.

After two seasons under Foley's leadership, Munster decided to appoint a director of rugby, Rassie Erasmus, and Walsh left the provinces coaching team, with his role largely being covered by former Munster player Felix Jones.
