= Dominic Crotty =

Irish rugby union player

- Born: Dominic Crotty; 26 July 1974 (age 52) Cork, Ireland
- Height: 6.1 ft (1.9 m)
- Weight: 14.2 st (90 kg)
- School: CBC, Cork
- University: University College Cork

Rugby union career
- Position(s): Fullback, Wing
Senior career
Years	Team	Apps	(Points)
- University College Cork RFC
–	Garryowen		
- Correct as of 11 July 2014
Provincial / State sides
Years	Team	Apps	(Points)
1995–2005	Munster	87	(80)
- Correct as of 11 July 2014
International career
Years	Team	Apps	(Points)
1996-2000	Ireland	5	(0)
- Correct as of 11 July 2014

Dominic Crotty (born 28 July 1974, Cork) is a retired Irish rugby union player.

== Playing career ==
During the munster schools cup quarter final against Crescent in February 1991, Crotty announced his arrival as a talent by kicking a match-equalising conversion, thus forcing a replay in Cork which his team won. He was 16 at the time. Years later, in UCC, he scored against UCD at the Mardyke. Crotty played at Fullback and also on the Wing for Garryowen, Munster and the Irish national team, earning five caps between 1996 and 2000.
