= Alan McGowan (rugby union) =

Irish rugby union player

- Born: 2 January 1972 (age 54) Dublin, Ireland
- Height: 1.78 m (5 ft 10 in)
- Weight: 82.73 kg (13.028 st; 182.4 lb)

Rugby union career
- Position: Fly-half
Amateur team(s)
Years	Team	Apps	(Points)
- Blackrock College RFC
Senior career
Years	Team	Apps	(Points)
1995–1998	Leinster	29	(372)
- Correct as of 25 December 2020
International career
Years	Team	Apps	(Points)
1994	Ireland	1	(13)
- Correct as of 25 December 2020

Alan McGowan is a former Irish rugby union player who played fly-half for Leinster Rugby and Blackrock College RFC.

On 5 November 1994, McGowan gained his only cap for Ireland, kicking 13 points in a win over the United States at Lansdowne Road.
