= Mattson =

Origin
- Meaning: "Son of Matt"
- Region of origin: Sweden

Other names
- Variant forms: Matson, Mattsson, Matheson, Mathewson, Mattsen

Mattson is a Swedish patronymic surname, meaning "son of Matt (shortened form of Matthew)". It is rare as a given name.

== People ==
- Brad Mattson, Silicon Valley entrepreneur
- Eli Mattson, pianist, singer, and runner-up on America's Got Talent
- Ellen Mattson, Swedish writer
- Hållbus Totte Mattson, Swedish musician
- Henry Mattson, Swedish painter
- Howard W. Mattson (1927–1998), American magazine editor
- Ingrid Mattson, Canadian Islamic scholar
- Jesper Mattson Cruus af Edeby (1576–1622), Swedish soldier and politician
- John Mattson, American screenwriter
- Mark Mattson, American neuroscientist
- Per Mattson (1895–1973), Swedish, Olympics rower
- Ragnar Mattson (1892–1965), Swedish, Olympics high jumper
- Richard Mattson (born 1935), American computer scientist
- Riley Mattson (born 1937), American football player
- Rita Mattson, American politician
- Robert Mattson (businessman), (1851–1935), Finnish shipowner and businessman
- Robert W. Mattson, Sr., American politician
- Robin Mattson, American actress
- Mattson Tomlin (born 1990), Romanian screenwriter and producer
- Peter Mattson, American filmmaker and owner of Taquet Film

== Companies ==
- Mattson Technology, California-based semiconductor company

== Fiction ==
- Mattson, a character in the film Child's Play 2

== Places ==
- Mattson, Edmonton, a neighbourhood in Edmonton, Canada

== See also ==
- Mattson Lake
