= Morten Wierod =

Norwegian business executive (born 1972)

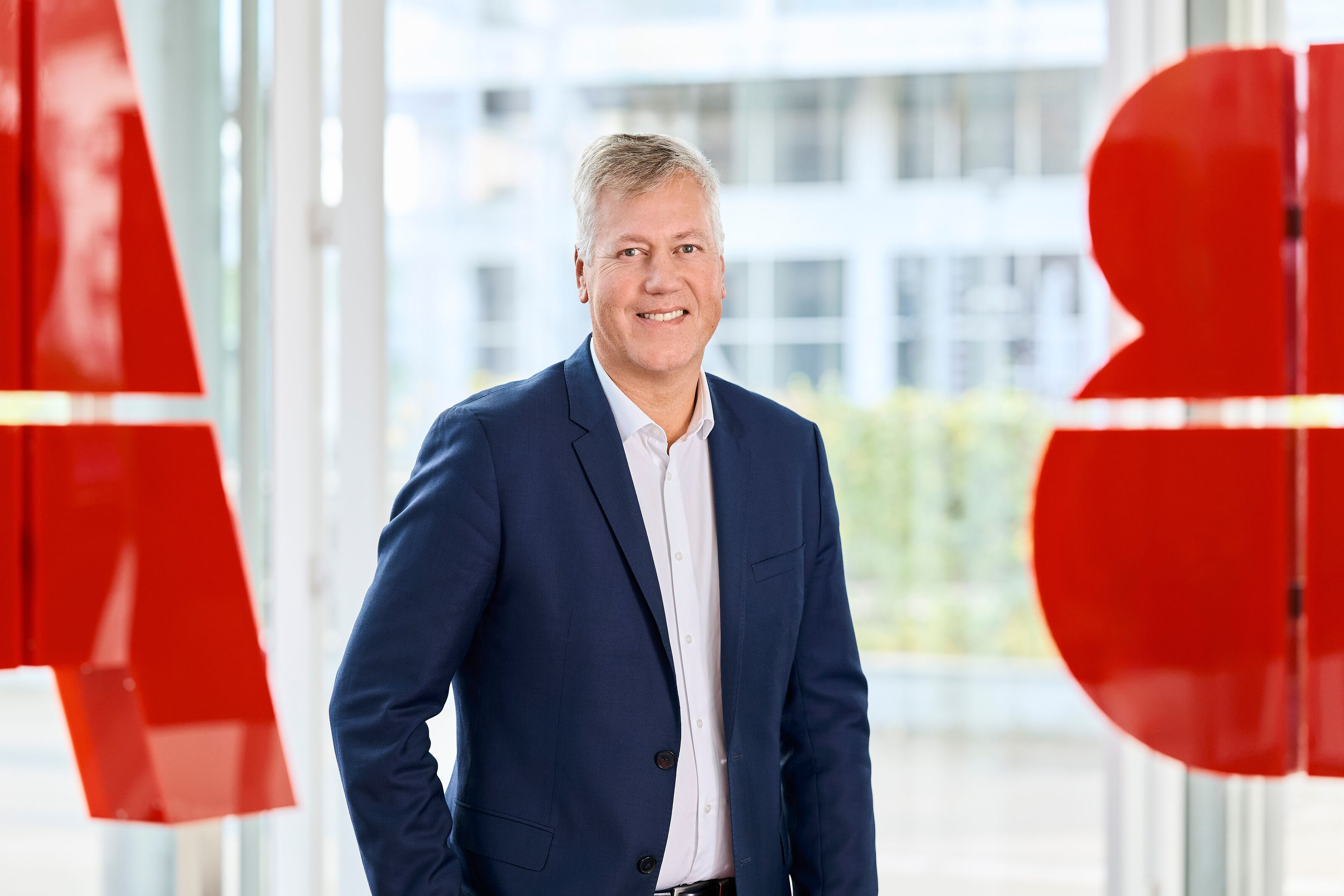
- Born: 1972 (age 53–54); Skien, Norway
- Education: Norwegian University of Science and Technology
- Occupation: business executive
- Years active: 1998–present
- Title: President and CEO of ABB
- Term: August 2024–present
- Predecessor: Björn Rosengren
- Children: 2

Morten Wierod (born 1972) is a Norwegian business executive, who is president and chief executive officer of the Swedish-Swiss industrial group ABB. He succeeded Björn Rosengren as ABB CEO in August 2024. He has been a member of ABB's Executive Committee (EC) since 2019, and has run two of its business areas, Electrification and Motion.

== Early life and education ==
Wierod graduated from the Norwegian University of Science and Technology (NTNU) in 1997 with a master's degree in electrical engineering.

== Career ==
Wierod joined ABB as a graduate engineer in 1998, ten years after BBC (Brown, Boveri & Cie) of Switzerland and ASEA of Sweden merged to form ABB. His first job was as an area sales manager at ABB in Norway. Within five years, he was put in charge of an ABB factory near Oslo and prevented its potential closure. In 2008, he moved to ABB's subsidiary in China, where he served as Local Business Unit Manager for the Low Voltage Products Division.

In 2011, he moved to Switzerland, where he took on the role of Managing Director for the Control Products business unit within the Low Voltage Products Division. He advanced to managing director of the Drives business unit in the Robotics and Motion division in 2015, and in 2019, he was appointed president of the Motion business area, simultaneously joining ABB's Group Executive Committee. In 2022, Wierod became President of the Electrification business area.

In the two years that he was in charge of ABB's Electrification business, Wierod increased revenues by 15 percent and the operational EBITA margin from 16 to 20 percent.

Since August 2024, Wierod has been CEO of ABB Ltd in Switzerland, having succeeded Björn Rosengren. As CEO, he announced that he would maintain the decentralized operating model introduced by Rosengren and advance the company's growth through investments and acquisitions.

== Personal life ==
Wierod is married to a biophysicist, and the couple have two sons.
