= Björn Rosengren =

Björn Rosengren may refer to:

- Björn Rosengren (politician)
- Björn Rosengren (businessman)
