= Carl Maier & Cie =

Swiss electrical engineering company

Carl Maier & Cie (CMC)

- Former CMC industrial site (now ABB) on Fulachstrasse in Schaffhausen (2011)
- Type: Public limited company
- Industry: Electrical equipment
- Founded: November 1, 1909
- Headquarters: Schaffhausen, Switzerland
- Website: go.abb/schaffhausen

Carl Maier & Cie (abbreviated CMC), founded on 1 November 1909 in Schaffhausen, was a Swiss manufacturer of electrical engineering equipment. The company developed the world's first plug-in socket system that allows components to be added or removed under live voltage (SMISSLINE), as well as circuit breaker technologies that continue to be used internationally.

Following its acquisition by ABB in 1992 and full corporate integration in 2001, the Schaffhausen facility operates as ABB Critical Power Schaffhausen within ABB's Smart Buildings division. It is one of eight ABB production and engineering sites in Switzerland and is responsible for the global development and manufacturing of the S800 high-performance circuit breaker series, the SMISSLINE TP (touch-proof) plug-in system, and magnetic trip components for residual-current devices.

The Schaffhausen site also operates an accredited high- and low-current testing laboratory for circuit breakers and electromagnetic compatibility (EMC), which ranks among Switzerland's most powerful testing installations.

== Founder Carl Maier ==
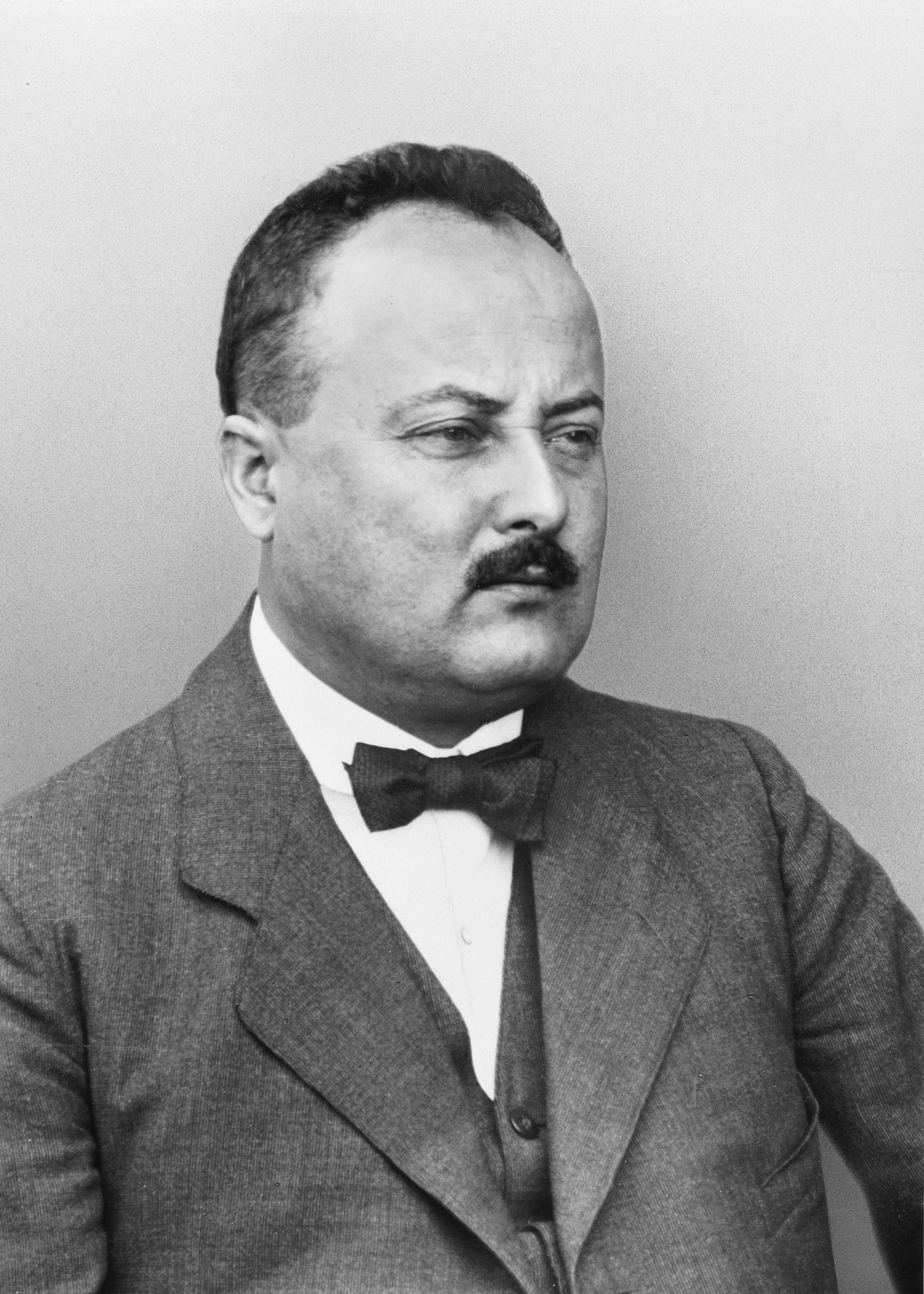
Carl Maier, Founder CMC

Carl Maier, then 32 years old, founded the Fabrik elektrischer Apparate (Factory for Electrical Apparatus) in Schaffhausen in 1909. In 1937 he handed over management to his son, but remained connected to the company until his death in 1952.

Carl Maier served for several years on the Schaffhausen cantonal council and on the board of the Schaffhausen Industry Association, which he co-founded.

== History ==
Catalog No. 1 for oil switches and accessories, August 1910

The production range covered electrical switching and protection devices for high- and low-voltage applications. The first brochures from 1910 offered oil switches for voltages up to 15,000 volts and currents up to 500 amperes, as well as motor switch boxes. The earliest surviving product list, from 1910, listed “oil switches and accessories.”

The factory also supplied switchgears for the control room and machine hall during the construction of the Elektrizitätswerk Schaffhausen (Schaffhausen power plant). In November 1910, a new factory building was occupied in the Schaffhausen industrial area of Ebnat, and production was expanded.

CMC was involved in numerous projects to electrify the Swiss Federal Railways:

- around 1915: control room at the Eglisau power plant
- around 1916: switchgear at the Massaboden power plant
- around 1920: switchgear at the Ritom power plant
- around 1922: switchgear at the Amsteg power plant

Following a capital investment by the engineer Ernst Hauser, the company was renamed Carl Maier & Cie (CMC for short) in 1923.

LOGA slide rule by Carl Maier & Cie (CMC) Schaffhausen (circa 1960)

In addition to manufacturing and distributing electrotechnical products, around 1960 the company produced the LOGA circular slide rule (also called a motor slide calculator) for three-phase asynchronous motors. Using sliding windows, the power output could be set for a given speed, and the rated current for a given voltage, as well as the apparent power, could be read off a double scale.

Since 1962, CMC has developed and produced electromagnetic relays, so-called magnetic trip units, which interrupt the circuit in the event of irregularities in current flow. In 1980, CMC introduced a high-performance miniature circuit breaker for protection against overcurrent.

In 1988, CMC introduced a plug-in socket system that allowed devices and components to be plugged in and removed under live voltage without additional protective equipment.

In 1992, the then-CMC was integrated into ABB Schweiz AG. In 1997, production of DIN rail components that ABB had acquired from Busch-Jaeger was integrated into CMC. In 2004, the Basel-based switches and sockets manufacturer Levy Fils AG was acquired.

== Innovation and legacy ==
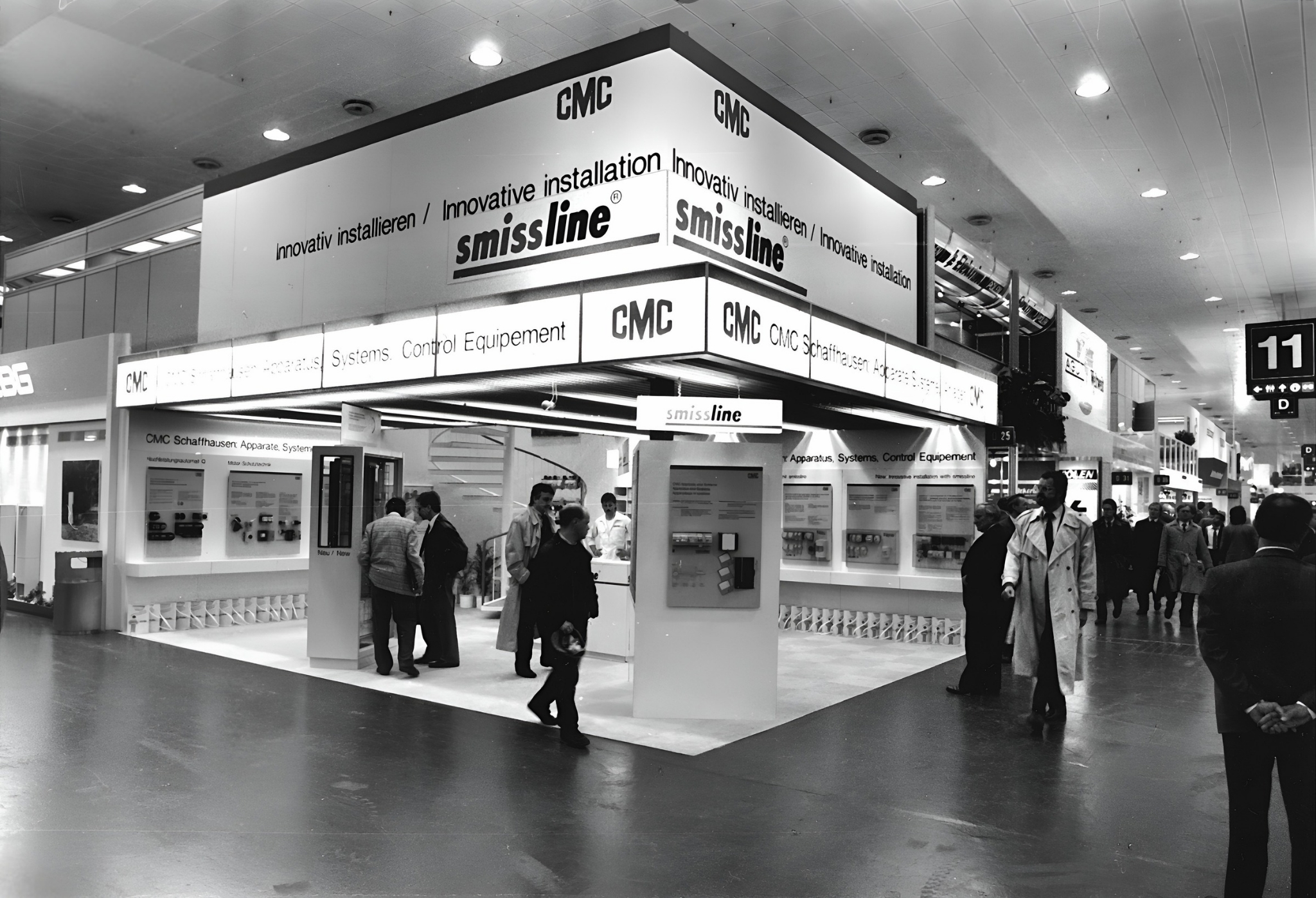
CMC trade fair booth presenting the SMISSLINE plug-in system at Ineltec 1989

Carl Maier & Cie developed technologies for protecting the power supply of critical infrastructure, which are still used in ABB products today:

- 1980: S500 circuit breaker – the basis for ABB’s current S800 series (0.5–125 A; short-circuit breaking capacity up to 50 kA)
- 1988: SMISSLINE – a plug-in socket system that remains live during insertion, further developed as SMISSLINE TP and SMISSLINE TP HP
- 1998: MA7 magnetic trip unit – a component used in ABB’s residual-current devices.

== High- and low-current laboratory ==
The Schaffhausen site operates its own high- and low-current testing laboratory, which was accredited in 1997 by the Swiss Federal Office of Metrology (today METAS). Approved for high-current and electromagnetic compatibility (EMC) testing, the facility is authorized to award tested protection and switching devices the safety mark of the Swiss Electrotechnical Association (SEV).

A core component of the facility is a 5-megavolt-ampere (MVA) high-current transformer, which was the largest of its kind in Switzerland upon commissioning and ranks among the country's most powerful testing installations. It enables alternating current tests of up to 50,000 amperes at voltages of up to 900 volts, while the direct current (DC) installation allows short-circuit, switching, and endurance tests up to 15,000 amperes and 1,000 volts.

== Awards (selection) ==
CMC Carl Maier + Cie. AG received the iF product design award in 1988 for the SMISSLINE protection and switching device system and in 1992 for the SIDOS safety adapter plug.

In 2010, ABB Schweiz AG (CMC) received the Intersolar AWARD in the photovoltaics category for its innovative remote-controlled switching unit, the S800-RSU.
