= Mattsson =

Mattsson is a Swedish surname.

- André Mattsson (born 1980), Swedish ice hockey player
- Arne Mattsson (1919–1995), Swedish film director
- Frank Mattsson (1868–1924), Finnish composer Oskar Merikanto
- Helena Mattsson (born 1984), Swedish actress
- Lars Eric Mattsson, Finnish musician
- Magnus Mattsson (born 1999), Danish footballer
- Markus Mattsson (born 1957), Finnish ice hockey player
- Per Mattsson (1948–2025), Swedish actor
- Stein-Erik Mattsson (born 1959), Norwegian lawyer, journalist, and comedian

== See also ==
- Matson
