= Resol =

Resol may refer to:

- RESOL, a German solar thermal technology company based in Hattingen
- a type of phenol formaldehyde resin
- See Novolacks
