= Novellus Systems =

Company

Novellus Systems, Inc.
- Novellus Systems logo
- Company type: Subsidiary of Lam Research
- Industry: Semiconductor
- Founded: 1984
- Founders: Brad Mattson
- Headquarters: San Jose, California
- Key people: Richard S. Hill, CEO; Timothy Archer, Chief Operating Officer] John Hertz, Chief Financial Officer
- Revenue: ▼$1.570 Billion USD (2006)
- Operating income: ▼$270 Million USD (2007)
- Net income: ▲$213 Million USD (2007)
- Number of employees: 2,400 (2010)
- Parent: Lam Research
- Website: www.lamresearch.com

Novellus Systems Inc. was a company founded by Brad Mattson that developed, manufactured, sold, and serviced semiconductor equipment used in the fabrication of integrated circuits. It was a supplier of chemical vapor deposition (CVD), plasma-enhanced chemical vapor deposition (PECVD), physical vapor deposition (PVD), electrochemical deposition (ECD), ultraviolet thermal processing (UVTP), and surface preparation equipment used in the manufacturing of semiconductors.

Novellus Systems was founded in 1984 and is headquartered in San Jose, California. The company maintains engineering & manufacturing facilities in Tualatin, Oregon and San Jose, California. Also, Novellus has a component design and software development facility in Bangalore, India.

In December 2011, Novellus agreed to be acquired by Lam Research for $3.3 billion. The acquisition was completed in June 2012.

== Product lines ==
Novellus' product lines were called ALTUS, ATHENA, GAMMA, INOVA, SABRE, SOLA, SPEED, and VECTOR, SEQUEL and assisted semiconductor companies with manufacturing.
