= Matson =

Matson may refer to:

- Matson (surname)
- Matson, Gloucester, England, a suburb of Gloucester
- Matson, Missouri, an unincorporated community
- 2586 Matson, an asteroid
- Matson, Inc., a shipping company, formerly Matson Navigation Company
- Matson Films, American film distributor

== See also ==
- Mattson
