= Pressure reactor =

A pressure reactor, sometimes referred to as a pressure tube, or a sealed tube, is a chemical reaction vessel which can conduct a reaction under pressure. A pressure reactor is a special application of a pressure vessel. The pressure can be caused by the reaction itself or created by an external source, like hydrogen in catalytic transfer hydrogenation.

== Advantages ==
A pressure reactor can offer several advantages over the conventional round-bottom flask. Firstly, it can conduct a reaction above the boiling point of a solvent. Secondly, the pressure can reduce the reaction volume, including the liquid phase, and in turn increase concentration and collision frequency, and accelerate a reaction.

Increase in temperature can speed up the desired reaction, but also speed up the decomposition of reagents and starting materials. However, pressure can speed up the desired reaction and only impacts decomposition when it involves the release of a gas or a reaction with a gas in the vessel. When the desired reaction is accelerated, competing reactions are minimized. Pressure generally enables faster reactions with cleaner reaction profiles.

The above benefits from a pressure reactor has been shown in microwave chemistry. E.g., if a Suzuki Coupling takes 8 hours at 80°C, it only takes 8 minutes at 140°C in a microwave synthesizer. The microwave effect is a controversial topic. Later experiments show some of these early reports to be artifacts and rate enhancement is strictly due to thermal effects.

If a pressure reactor is engineered properly, it can meet 4 out of 12 green chemistry principles

- 1, less solvent and cleaner reaction profile result in less waste
- 5, less solvent is needed
- 6, short reaction time can save up to 92 percent electricity and 200 gallons of cooling water per refluxed reaction
- 12, closed vessel can prevent releasing toxic gas and explosions.

== Types of Pressure Reactors ==
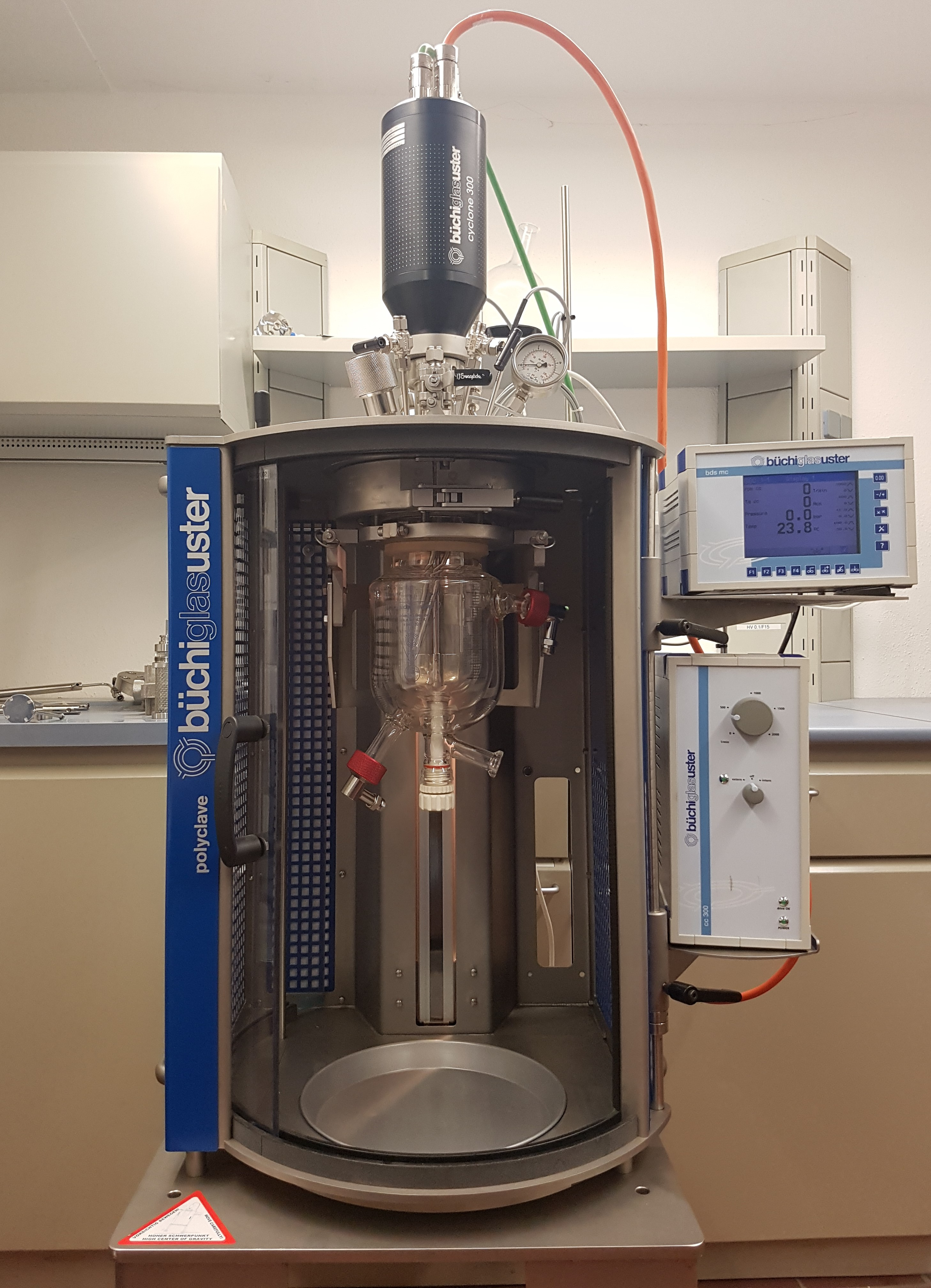
Standard glass Pressure Reactor

=== Standard glass pressure reactor ===
Glass Pressure reactors are typically used when an operator needs to observe how a reaction takes place. Although the pressure ratings on these systems are lower than most metal pressure reactors, they are still an efficient set up for reaching responsible pressure limits. The ratings on glass vessels are directly related to the diameter of the vessel. The larger the diameter, the lower the allowable pressure. Integrated bottom valves can also impact the pressure ratings. A bottom valve on a glass vessel typically relates to a lower allowable working pressure. These are all variables determined by the process and parameters of each individual reaction. Glass pressure vessels can also be used in inert applications. These vessels are used in reactions included but are not limited to Hydrogenations, Polymerizations, Synthesis, Catalytic, petrochemical, crystallization, and so on.

One of the drawbacks of a standard glass pressure reactor is the potential explosions due to hard-to-predict excessive internal pressure and lack of relief mechanism. However, with proper safety implementation provided by the manufacturer, the operator can perform most reactions in a safe manner.

=== Fisher-Porter tube ===
A Fisher-Porter tube or Fisher-Porter vessel is a glass pressure reactor used in the chemical laboratory. Manufactured by Andrews Glass Co. of Vineland NJ

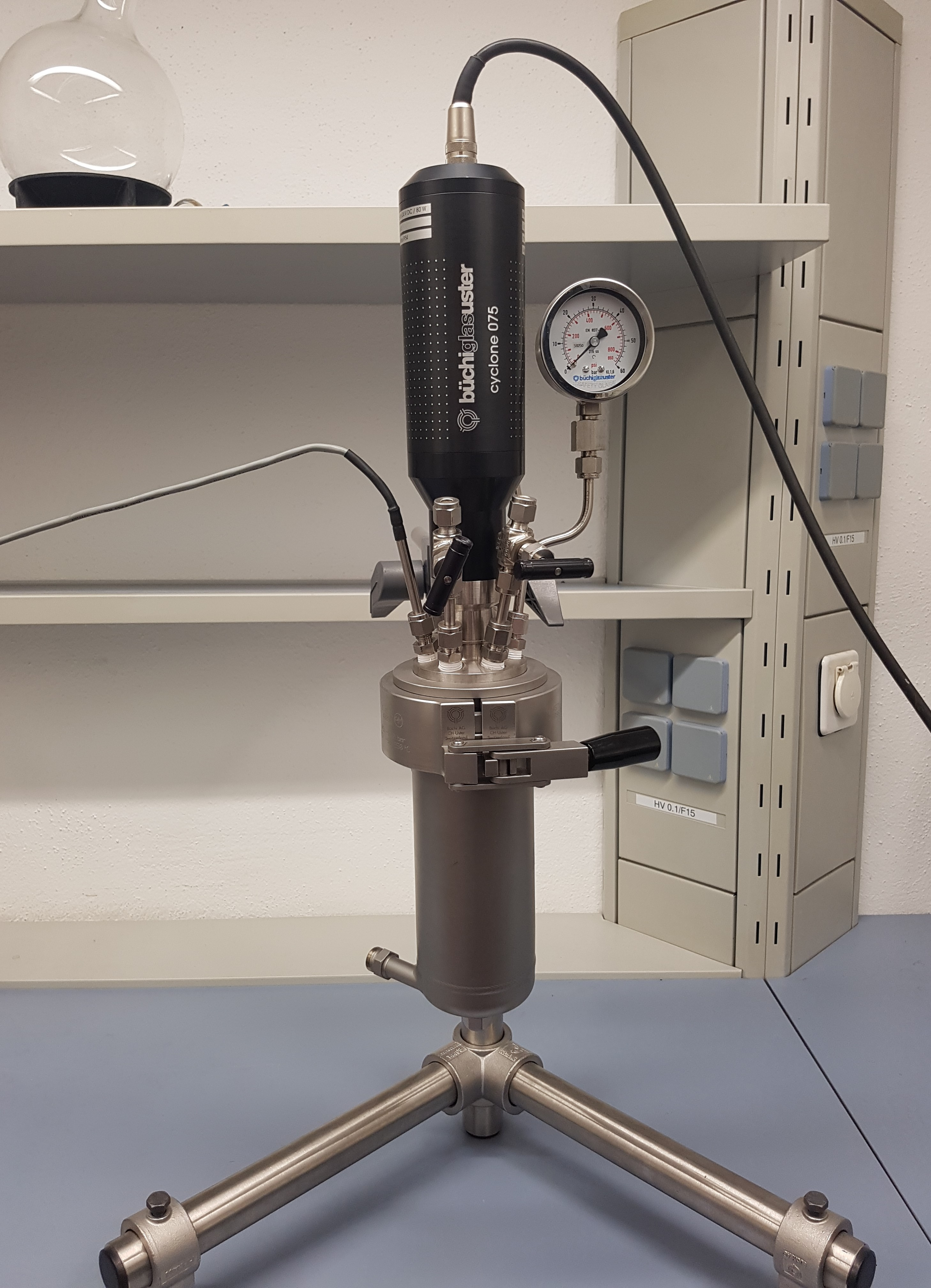
High Pressure Reactor

=== Metal pressure reactor ===
Metal Pressure reactors are typically used for high pressure reactions. They have a much higher pressure rating than glass reactors. Although they have a higher pressure rating, they still have their own distinct flaws. One of which would be that metal vessels are more susceptible to corrosion. The material of construction (MOC) is particularly important during the design phase of a metal pressure reactor. The correct MOC can reduce or even eliminate the corrosion seen in the vessel but, depending on the material chosen, could increase the price of a system. Metal vessels are also much heavier and should be handled carefully when performing maintenance.

Metal high pressure reactors are used in reactions included but are not limited to Hydrogenation, Polymerization, Synthesis, Catalytic, Petrochemical and so on. They are also used to perform research such as Upstream, Biomass, Biopolymer, Zeolite, etc.

The drawbacks of a metal pressure reactor (bomb) are set-up, maintenance, and corrosiveness.

=== Microwave synthesizer ===
The drawbacks of a microwave synthesizer are solvent limitation

== See also ==
Pressure cooking
Pressure vessel
