= ABB =

Swedish–Swiss multinational company private ltd

ABB Ltd
- Trade name: ABB
- Type: Public
- Traded as: SIX: ABBN; Nasdaq Stockholm: ABB; SMI component; OMX Stockholm 30 component
- ISIN: CH0012221716
- Industry: Electrical equipment
- Predecessors: Allmänna Svenska Elektriska Aktiebolaget (ASEA); Brown, Boveri & Cie
- Founded: 1988; 38 years ago
- Headquarters: Zurich, Switzerland
- Area served: Worldwide
- Key people: Peter Voser (Chairperson); Björn Rosengren (CEO)
- Revenue: ▲US$33.2 billion (2026)
- Operating income: ▲US$5.07 billion (2024)
- Net income: ▲US$3.93 billion (2024)
- Total assets: ▼US$40.36 billion (2024)
- Total equity: ▲US$15.06 billion (2024)
- Owners: Investor AB (14.3%); BlackRock (4.17%); UBS Fund Management (5%)
- Number of employees: c. 112,000 (2026)
- Website: global.abb
- Footnotes: Financials as of as of 31 December 2024; Countries where ABB is present, 2022

ABB Group is a Swedish-Swiss technology company, that operates in the fields of electrification and automation. The company was formed in 1988 from the merger of two electrical engineering companies, ASEA of Sweden and Brown, Boveri & Cie (BBC) of Switzerland.

Incorporated in Switzerland as ABB Ltd, and headquartered in Zurich, it is dual-listed on the Nasdaq Nordic exchange in Stockholm, Sweden, and the SIX Swiss Exchange in Zurich, in addition to OTC Markets Group's pink sheets in the United States. For 30 years, it has been a part of the Fortune Global 500.

Employees of ABB and its predecessor companies developed several technologies for generating, transmitting, and distributing electricity, as well as for enabling industrial automation. One is the miniature circuit breaker, invented by Hugo Stotz, which protects against fires and is found in almost every home. Predecessor ASEA was the first company to introduce a microprocessor into an industrial robot and it helped to develop the electric propulsion system "Azipod", which improved manoeuvrability by locating the propulsion system outside the hull.

ABB is made up of around 20 divisions structured into four business areas: Electrification, Motion, Process Automation and Robotics & Discrete Automation. Previously, it had a large power grids business, which was sold to Hitachi in 2020, as well as a turbocharging business, that was spun off in 2022. Over the years, ABB made different acquisitions, with major ones in the 21st century including Baldor Electric, Thomas & Betts, and the GE Industrial Solutions division of General Electric.

The company's activities have been the subject of controversy on multiple occasions. US-based Combustion Engineering, acquired by ABB in 1990, exposed the company to asbestos-related litigation, which led to ABB’s first-ever loss in 2001. A final claims settlement was reached in 2006. ABB has also been subject to three US Foreign Corrupt Practices Act bribery settlements in 2004, 2010, and 2022. Additionally, in 2001, an ABB entity pleaded guilty to bid rigging.

During the 2010s, ABB largely focused its growth strategy on the robotics and industrial automation sectors. Before the sale of its Power Grids division to Hitachi in 2020, ABB was Switzerland's largest industrial employer.

== History ==
=== Predecessor companies and formation ===
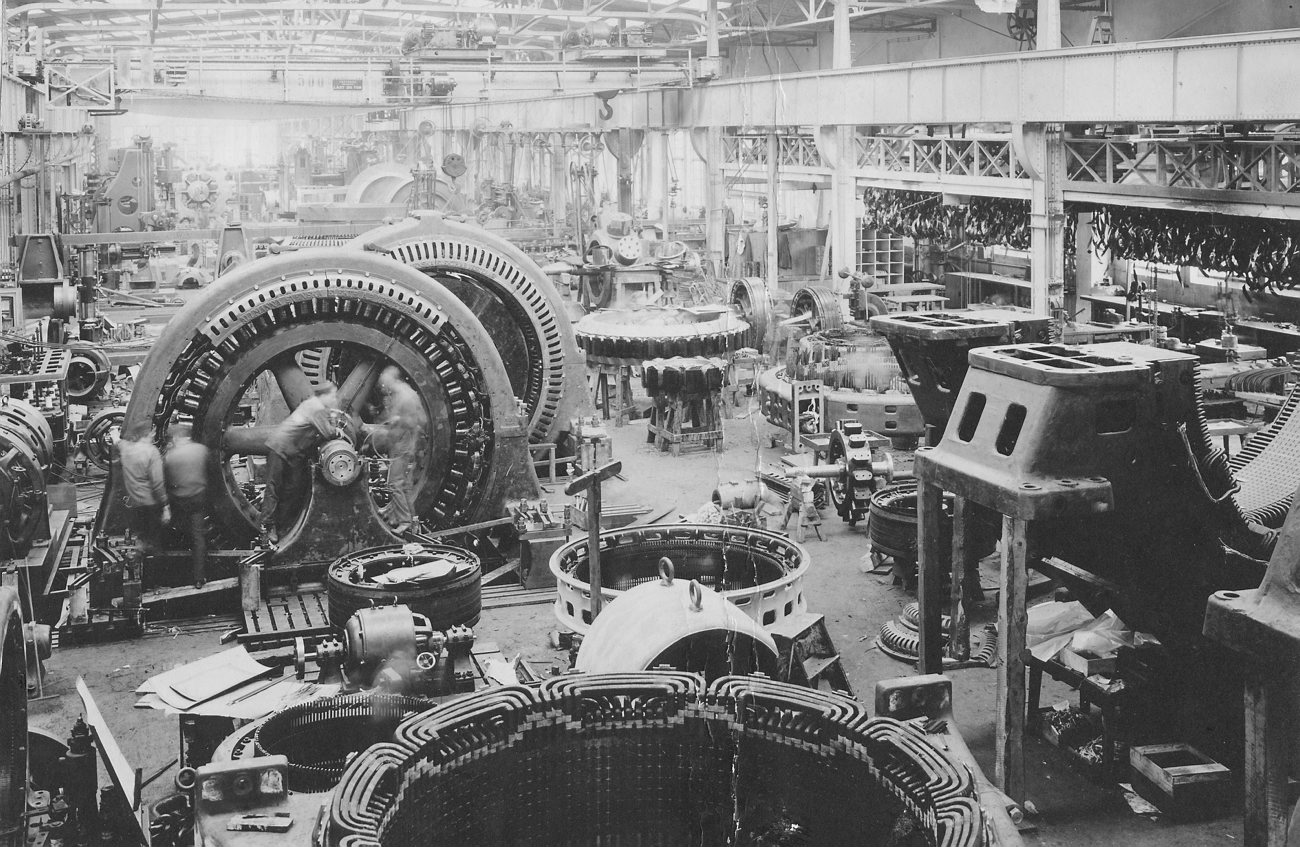
Interior of the assembly hall at ASEA in Västerås, Sweden, 1947

Allmänna Svenska Elektriska Aktiebolaget (ASEA, English translation: General Swedish Electrical Company Limited) was founded in 1883 in Västerås, Sweden by Ludvig Fredholm as manufacturer of electrical light and generators.

Brown, Boveri & Cie (BBC) was formed in 1891 in Baden near Zurich, Switzerland by Charles Eugene Lancelot Brown and Walter Boveri as a Swiss group of electrical engineering companies producing AC and DC motors, generators, steam turbines and transformers.

On 10 August 1987, ASEA and BBC announced they would merge to form ASEA Brown Boveri (ABB). The new corporation would remain headquartered in both Zurich, Switzerland and Västerås, Sweden, with each parent company holding 50 percent. The merger created a global industrial group with revenue of approximately $15 billion and 160,000 employees. The merger also included the Finnish company Strömberg that had been purchased by ASEA the same year.

When ABB began operations on 5 January 1988, its core businesses included power generation, transmission and distribution; electric transportation; and industrial automation and robotics.

In its first year, ABB undertook some 15 acquisitions, including the environmental control group Fläkt AB of Sweden, the contracting group Sadelmi/Cogepi of Italy, and the railway manufacturer Scandia-Randers A/S of Denmark. In 1989, ABB purchased an additional 40 companies, including Westinghouse Electric's transmission and distribution assets, and announced an agreement to purchase the Stamford, Connecticut-based Combustion Engineering (C-E).

=== 1990s ===
In 1990, ABB bought the robotics business of Cincinnati Milacron in the US. The acquisition expanded ABB's automated spot-welding operations in the American automotive industry. ABB's 1991 introduction of the IRB 6000 robot, demonstrated its increased capacity in this field. The first modular robot, the IRB 6000, can be reconfigured to perform a variety of specific tasks. The IRB 6000 was designed for spot-welding applications.

In 1990, ABB also expanded into Australia when it acquired Commonwealth Engineering's plant in Dandenong, Melbourne. ABB continued to manufacture Comeng's B-class Melbourne tram at the plant. However, it did not continue manufacturing Comeng's Adelaide 3000 class railcar, which was manufactured by Clyde Engineering instead.

In the early 1990s, ABB started expanding in Central and Eastern Europe. By the end of 1991, the company employed 10,000 people in the region. The following year, that number doubled. A similar pattern played out in Asia, where the reform and opening up in China and the lifting of some economic sanctions, helped open the region to a new wave of outside investment and industrial growth.

In March 1992, ABB bought out the other shareholders of the formerly state owned BREL, making BREL a wholly owned subsidiary. It was subsumed into ABB Transportation in September 1992. Amid the wider privatisation of British Rail during the 1990s, BREL was sold via a management buyout, with management and employees owning 20% and ABB and Trafalgar House 40% each. At the time of the management buyout, BREL's locations comprised Crewe, York, and two separate works in Derby; Derby Locomotive Works was closed by 1991.

In 1992, ABB also expanded its Swiss low- and high-voltage switchgear operations by acquiring the Schaffhausen-based electrical equipment manufacturer Carl Maier & Cie (CMC), integrating the site into its electrification business.

By 1994, ABB had 30,000 employees across Asia as well as 100 plants, engineering, service and marketing centers; numbers that would continue to grow. Through the 1990s, ABB continued its strategy of targeted expansion in Eastern Europe, the Asia–Pacific region and the Americas. In 1995, ABB agreed to merge its rail engineering unit with that of Daimler-Benz of Germany; the goal of this arrangement was to create the world's largest maker of locomotives and railway cars. The new company, ABB Daimler-Benz Transportation (Adtranz), had an initial global market share of nearly 12 percent. The merge took effect on 1 January 1996.

A few months following the start of the 1997 Asian financial crisis, ABB announced plans to accelerate its expansion in Asia as well as to improve the productivity and profitability of its Western operations. The company took an $850 million restructuring charge and shed 10,000 jobs as it scaled back some of its facilities in higher-cost countries and shifted resources towards emerging markets.

In June 1998, ABB announced that it would acquire Sweden-based Alfa Laval's automation unit, which at the time was one of Europe's top suppliers of process control systems and automation equipment.

In 1999, as a final step in the integration of the companies formerly known as ASEA and BBC, the directors unanimously approved a plan to create a unified, single class of shares in the group.

That same year, ABB completed its purchase of Elsag Bailey Process Automation, a Netherlands-based maker of industrial control systems, for $2.1 billion. The acquisition increased ABB's presence in the high-tech industrial robotics and factory control system sectors, reducing its reliance on traditional heavy engineering sectors such as power generation and transmission.

In 1999, the company sold its stake in the Adtranz train-building business to DaimlerChrysler. Instead of building complete locomotives, ABB's transportation activities shifted increasingly toward traction motors and electric components. That same year, ABB and France-based Alstom announced the merger of their power generation businesses in a 50-50 joint company, ABB Alstom Power. Separately, in December 1999, ABB agreed to sell its nuclear power business to British Nuclear Fuels of the United Kingdom.

=== 2000s ===
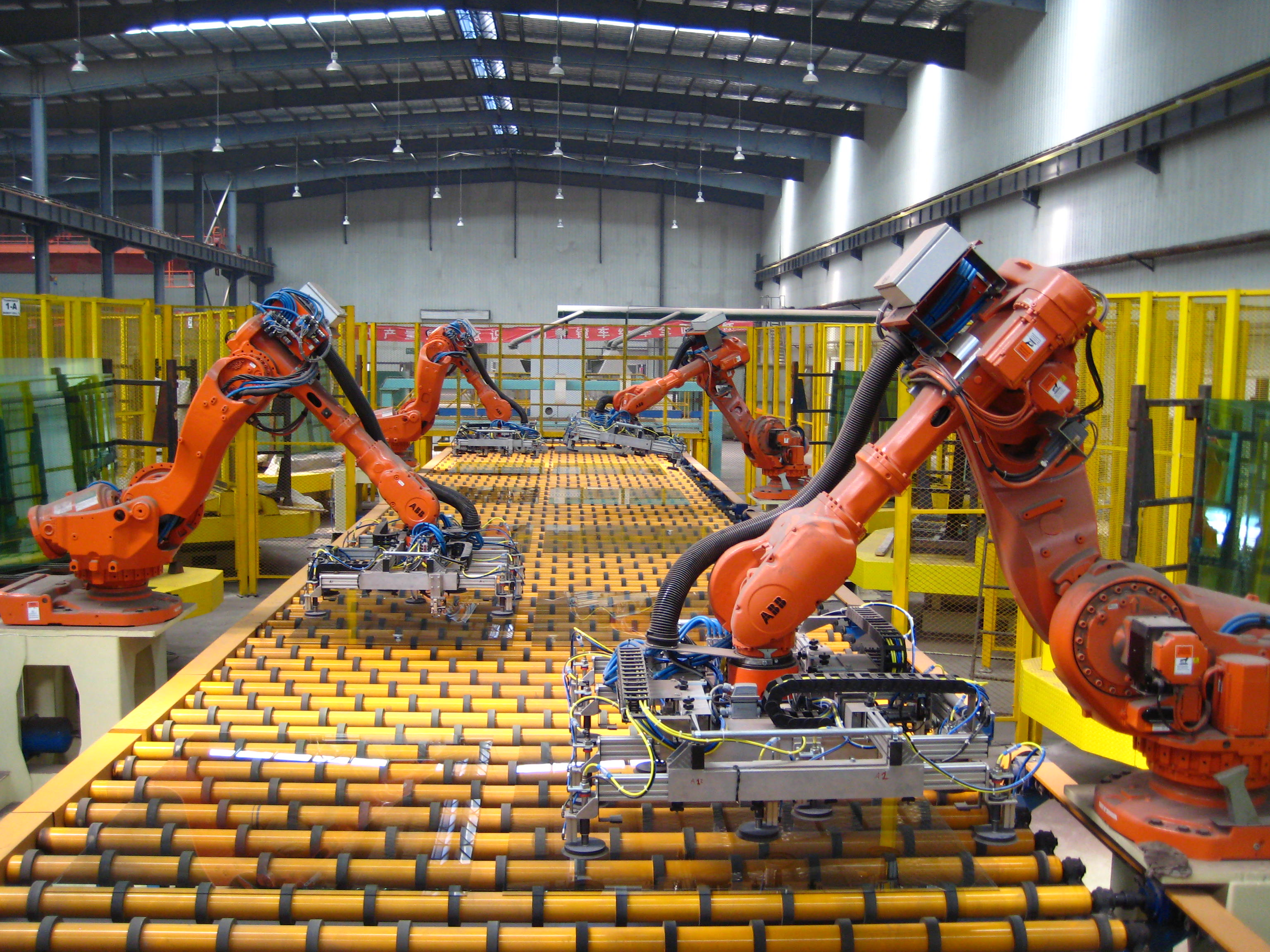
ABB robots handling float glass on a production line, 2008

In 2000, ABB divested its interests in ABB Alstom Power and sold its boiler and fossil-fuel operations (including Gas turbines) to Alstom.

In early 2002, ABB announced its first-ever annual loss, a $691 million net loss for 2001. The loss was caused by ABB's decision to double its provisions for settlement costs from $470 million to $940 million in asbestos-related litigation against its American subsidiary Combustion Engineering. The provisions were to cover claims linked to asbestos products sold by Combustion Engineering prior to its acquisition by ABB. At the same time, ABB's board announced it would seek the partial return of retirement pay from Goran Lindahl and Percy Barnevik, two former chief executive officers of the group. Barnevik received some $89 million in pension benefits when he left ABB in 2001; Lindahl, who succeeded Barnevik as CEO, had received $50 million in pension benefits, which ABB's board called "excessive".

In 2004, ABB sold its upstream oil and gas business, ABB Vetco Gray, to a consortium of private equity investors for an initial sum of $925 million. ABB continued to play an active role in the oil and gas industry via its core automation and power technology businesses.

In 2005, ABB delisted its shares from the London Stock Exchange and Frankfurt Stock Exchange. The following year, the company resolved its asbestos liabilities against its US subsidiaries, Combustion Engineering and ABB Lummus Global, Inc, for $1.43 billion. A three-part capital strengthening plan also aided in ABB's recovery.

In August 2007, ABB Lummus Global, ABB's downstream oil and gas business, was sold to CB&I for $950 million. The sale led to ABB making an accelerated $204 million payment to the CE Asbestos PI Trust, a trust fund covering the asbestos liabilities of Combustion Engineering.

In 2008, ABB agreed to acquire Kuhlman Electric Corporation, a US-based maker of transformers for the industrial and electric utility sectors. In November 2008, ABB acquired Ber-Mac Electrical and Instrumentation to expand its presence in Western Canada's oil and gas industries.

=== 2010s ===
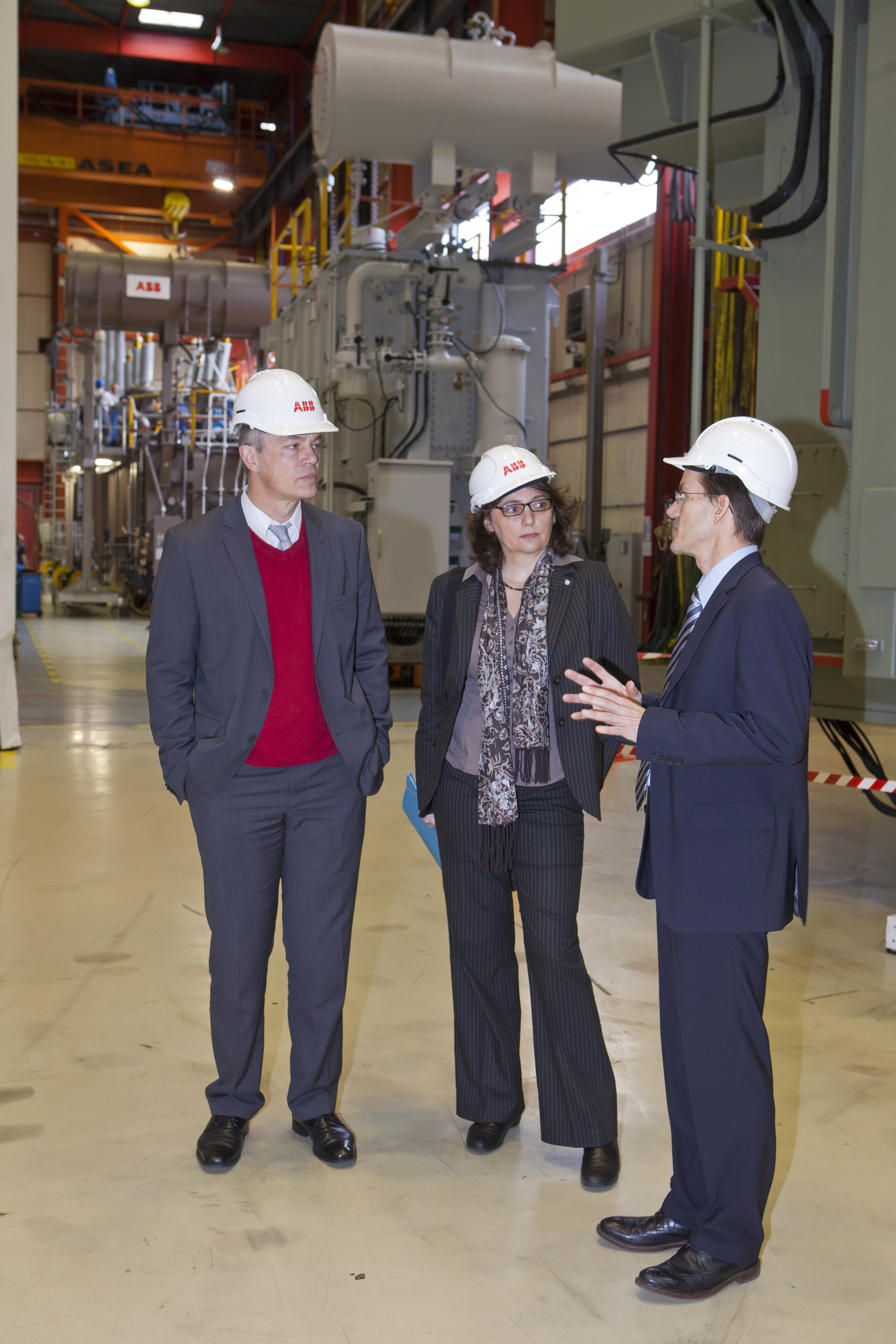
Tour of a ABB transformer station in Germany which gathers energy from offshore wind farms, 2013

In September 2010, the company bought K-TEK, a manufacturer of level measurement instruments, for $50 million; it was incorporated into ABB's Measurement Products business unit within ABB's Process Automation division.

In July 2010, ABB in Cary, North Carolina received a $4.2 million grant from the US federal government to develop energy storing magnets.

On 10 January 2011, ABB invested $10 million in ECOtality, a San Francisco-based developer of charging stations and power storage technologies, to enter North America's electric vehicle charging market. On 1 July of that year, the company announced its acquisition of Epyon B.V. of the Netherlands, a manufacturer of EV-charging infrastructure.

In early 2011, ABB acquired Baldor Electric for $4.2 billion in an all-cash transaction as part of ABB's strategy to increase its market share in the North American industrial motors segment. On 30 January 2012, the company announced the acquisition of Thomas & Betts, a North American specialist in low voltage products for industrial, construction and utility applications, in a $3.9 billion cash transaction. On 15 June 2012, ABB completed its acquisition of commercial and industrial wireless technology specialists Tropos.

In July 2013, ABB acquired Power-One in a $1 billion all-cash transaction to become the leading global manufacturer of solar inverters. That same year, Fastned selected ABB to supply more than 200 Terra fast-charging stations along highways in the Netherlands.

On 6 July 2017, ABB announced it had completed its acquisition of Bernecker + Rainer Industrie-Elektronik (B&R), the largest independent provider of product and software-based open-architecture for industrial automation.

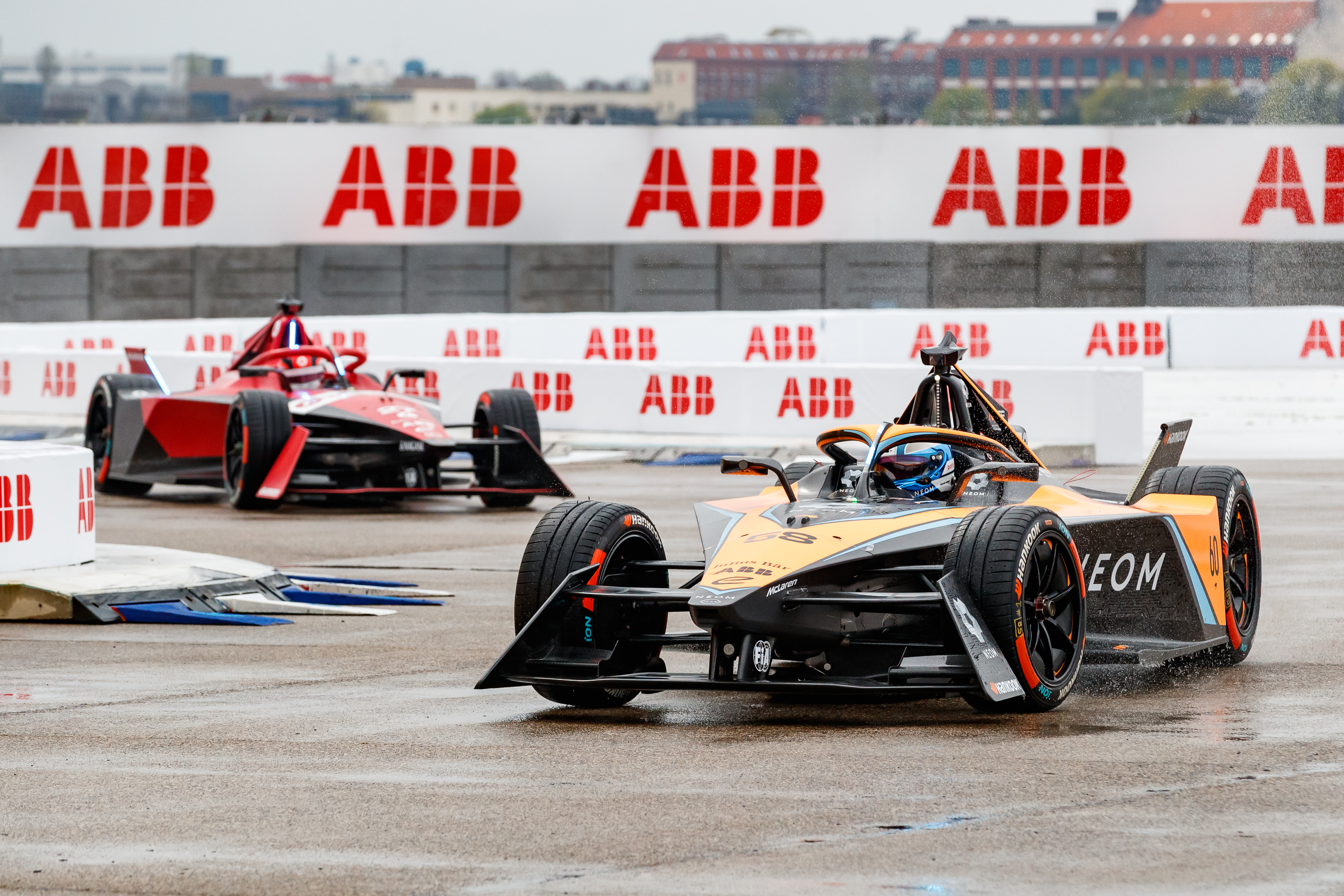
Since 2018, ABB has been the title sponsor for the Formula E electric racing series

During January 2018, ABB became the title partner of the ABB FIA Formula E Championship, the world's first fully electric international FIA motorsport series. On 30 June 2018, the company completed its acquisition of GE Industrial Solutions, General Electric's global electrification business.

On 17 December 2018, ABB announced it had agreed to sell 80.1% of its Power Grids business to Hitachi; the former Power Grids division thus became a part of the Hitachi Group and was rebranded to Hitachi Energy. During December 2022, it was confirmed that Hitachi had acquired the remaining 19.9% of the business.

=== 2020s ===
In March 2020, ABB announced the intent to purchase Cylon Controls Ltd. (Cylon). The acquisition enhanced ABB Electrification business' position in the commercial buildings segment.

Also in March 2020, ABB announced that it had agreed to sell its solar inverter business to Italian solar inverter manufacturer Fimer; the transaction includes all of ABB's manufacturing and R&D sites in Finland, Italy and India, along with 800 employees across 26 countries.

In November 2021, ABB completed the sale of its Mechanical Power Transmission business to RBC Bearings Inc. for $2.9 billion in cash. The sale was part of ABB's broader strategy to streamline its business and reduce its range of activities.

In July 2022, the company announced the spinoff of its turbocharging business to shareholders. The spinoff was completed in October 2022 when the business was listed on the SIX Swiss Exchange under the new name of Accelleron.

During December 2022, ABB opened a new 67,000 square metre robotics factory in Shanghai following a $150 million investment.

In May 2023, ABB announced that it had completed the acquisition of Siemens' low-voltage NEMA motors business, with manufacturing operations in Guadalajara, Mexico. At the time, the business employed around 600 people and generated revenues of approximately $63 million in 2021.

In June 2023, ABB agreed to acquire smart home automation provider Eve Systems.

In September 2023, ABB announced it would partner with the Well Done Foundation to monitor methane and greenhouse gas emissions from orphaned wells in the United States.

In January 2024, ABB acquired Real Tech, a prominent Canadian company specializing in innovative optical sensor technology for real-time water monitoring and testing. It also acquired two start-ups, Sevensense and the R&D engineering firm Meshmind, to expand its activities in AI and software.

In 2024, ABB increased its acquisition activity and announced several smaller transactions, including the acquisition of Siemens' wiring accessories business in China, which included a distribution network across 230 cities, and the power electronics business of Gamesa Electric in Spain from Siemens Gamesa.

As of 2025, ABB planned to rebrand all of its residential electrical product lines acquired from GE with the ABB ReliaHome brand.

In October 2025, ABB agreed to sell its industrial robotics business to SoftBank Group in a $5.4 billion deal—preempting plans to spin the division off as its own company in 2026. The business has approximately 7,000 employees and with revenues in 2024 of $2.3 billion, it represented about 7 percent of ABB Group revenues. In November 2026, SoftBank's acquisition was blocked by China's National Development and Reform Commission.

In December 2025, it was announced ABB had completed its acquisition of Gamesa Electric's power electronics business in Spain from Siemens Gamesa, originally revealed in December 2024. The acquired portfolio includes power conversion products such as wind converters for doubly-fed induction generators (DFIG), industrial battery energy storage systems (BESS), and utility-scale solar inverters. Financial terms were not disclosed.

== Products and services ==
=== Major product launches and innovations ===
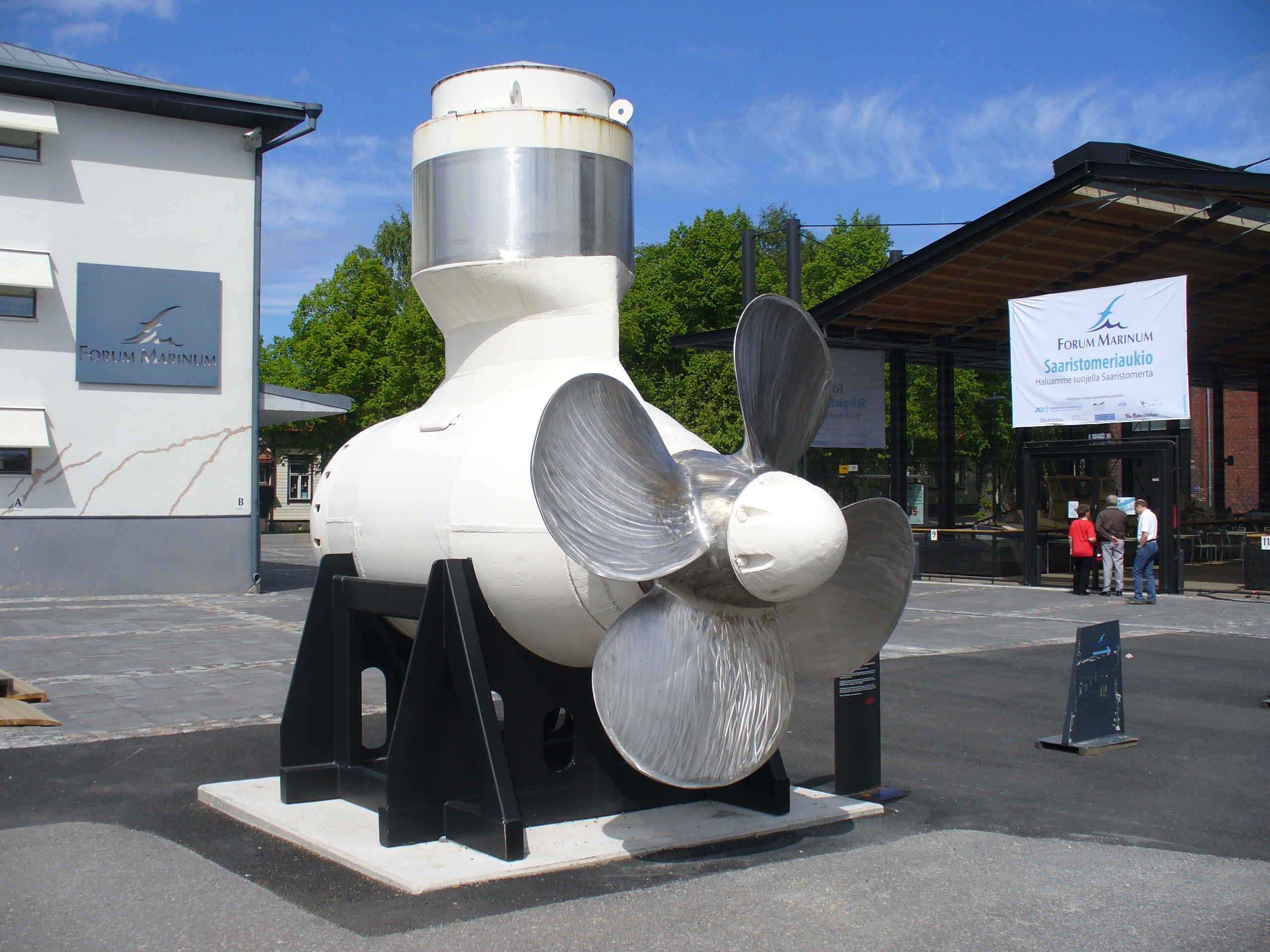
First-ever Azipod built

In 1990, ABB launched Azipod, a family of electric propulsion systems that extends below the hulls of large ships, providing both thrust and steering functions. Developed in cooperation with the Finnish shipbuilder Masa-Yards, Azipod has demonstrated the viability of hybrid-electric power in seagoing vessels, while also increasing maneuverability, fuel efficiency and space efficiency.

In 1998, ABB launched the FlexPicker, a robot using a three-armed delta design uniquely suited to the picking and packing industry.

In 2000, ABB brought to market the world's first commercial high-voltage shore-to-ship electric power, at the Swedish port of Gothenburg. Supplying electricity to berthed ships from the shore enables vessels to shut down their engines while in port, significantly reducing noise, vibrations and carbon emissions.

In 2004, ABB launched its Extended Automation System 800xA, an industrial system for the process industries. As of 2021, ABB had a leading share of 20% in the market for distributed control systems.

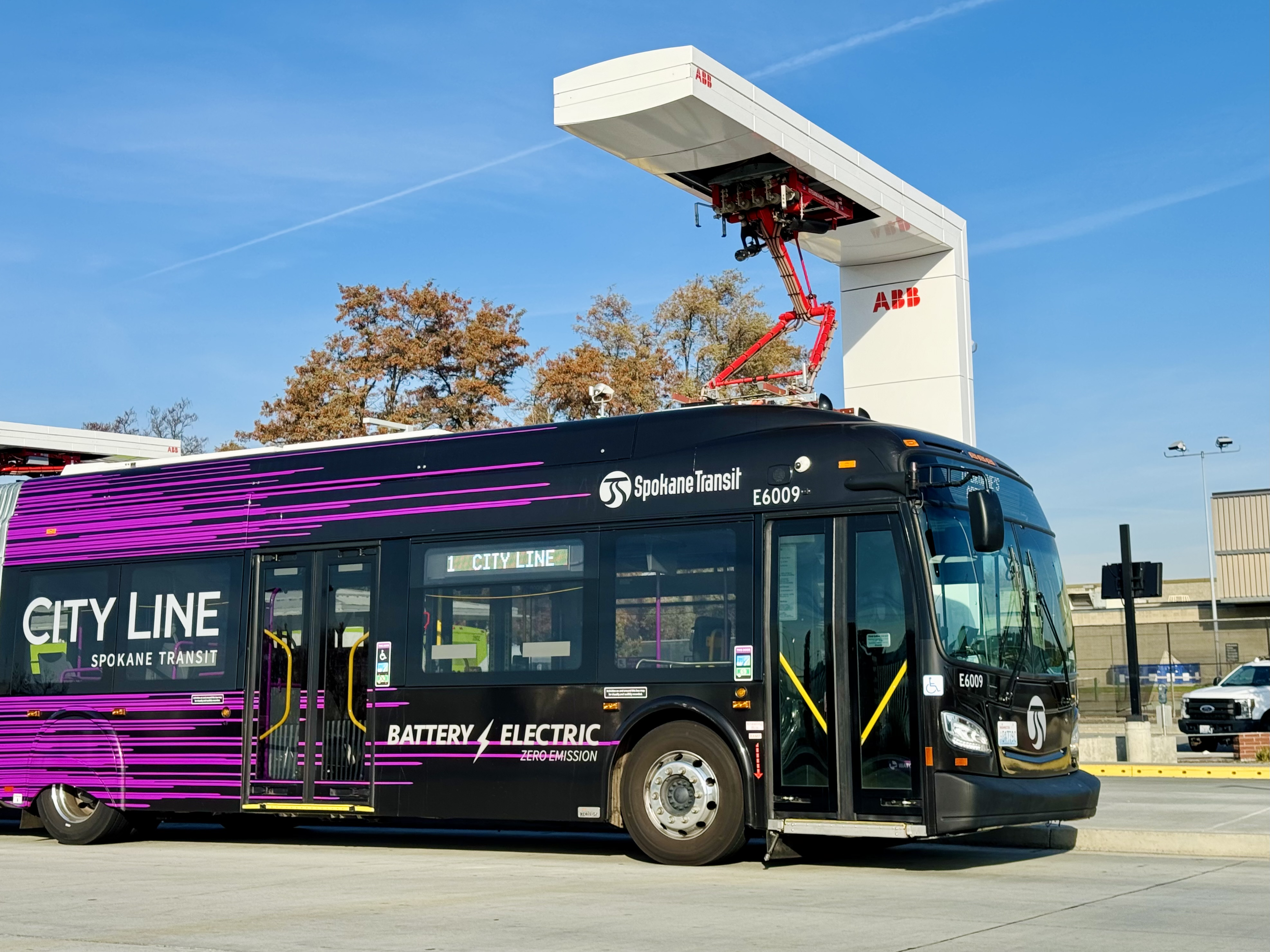
ABB SAE J3105 overhead pantograph charging Spokane Transit Authority City Line bus

In May 2013, ABB Sécheron SA joined with several groups in Geneva TOSA (Trolleybus Optimisation Système Alimentation, or in English, Trolleybus Power System Optimization) in a one-year demonstration of a trolleybus route using a novel charging system. Rather than overhead wires, charging is accomplished by fixed overhead devices located at stops along the route and at the terminus. Jean-Luc Favre, head of Rail ISI, discussed the promising role of improved electric transport technology in ABB.

In 2014, ABB unveiled YuMi, a collaborative industrial dual-arm assembly robot that permits people and machines to work side by side, unlocking new potential for automation in a range of industries.

In 2018, ABB unveiled the Terra High Power charger for electric vehicles, capable of delivering enough to charge in eight minutes to enable an electric car to travel 200 km (120 mi).

In 2025, ABB Building Automation and Controls, a division of Electrification Smart Buildings, introduced ABB Ability BuildingPro, for smart building automation and management. It is designed as a fully integrated cloud-connected platform, and unifies HVAC, lighting, energy, and asset control under one interface. It is also said to have real-time visibility with AI and IoT-driven optimization, offering remote management across entire building portfolios. It has an open architecture and scalable edge-to-cloud design for interoperability and sustainability, enabling commercial buildings to achieve higher efficiency, lower operational costs, and improved occupant comfort.

=== Electrification ===
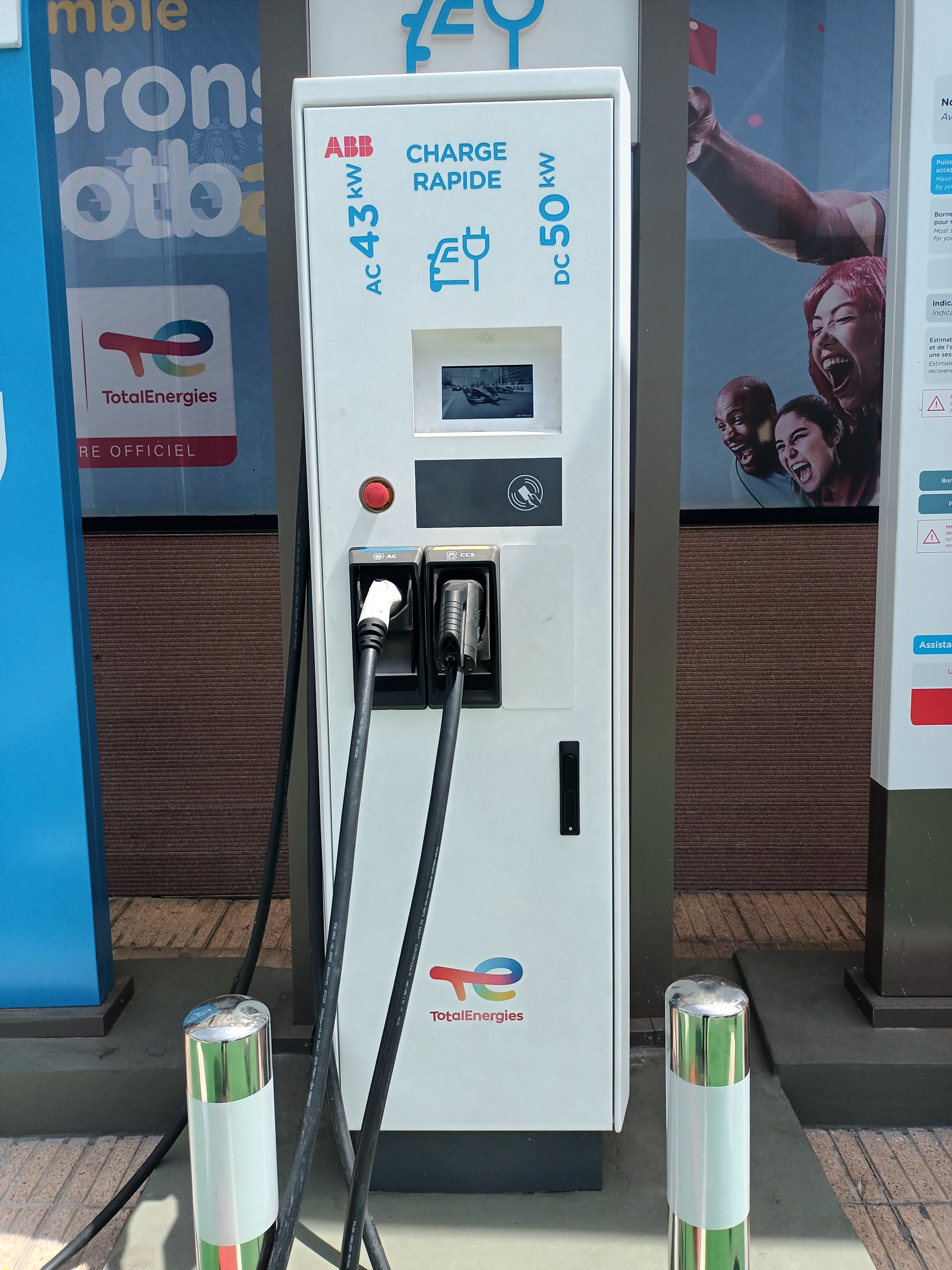
ABB rapid charging station

ABB's Electrification business area offers products and services from substation to socket. Customers include a wide range of industry and utility operations, plus commercial and residential buildings. The business has strong exposure to rapidly growing segments, including renewables, data centers and smart buildings.

ABB Electrification offers technologies for low- and medium-voltage, including electric vehicle (EV) infrastructure, modular substations, distribution automation, power protection, wiring accessories, switchgear, enclosures, cabling, sensing and control.

The acquisition of GE Industrial Solutions, which was completed in June 2018, further strengthened ABB's #2 global position in electrification.

=== Motion ===
ABB's Motion business area provides a range of electrical motors, generators, drives and services, as well as integrated digital powertrain solutions. Motion is the #1 player in the market globally. In September 2023, it was announced ABB Motion had acquired a minority stake in the Burlington-headquartered wind turbine analytics software company, WindESCo.

=== Robotics and discrete automation ===
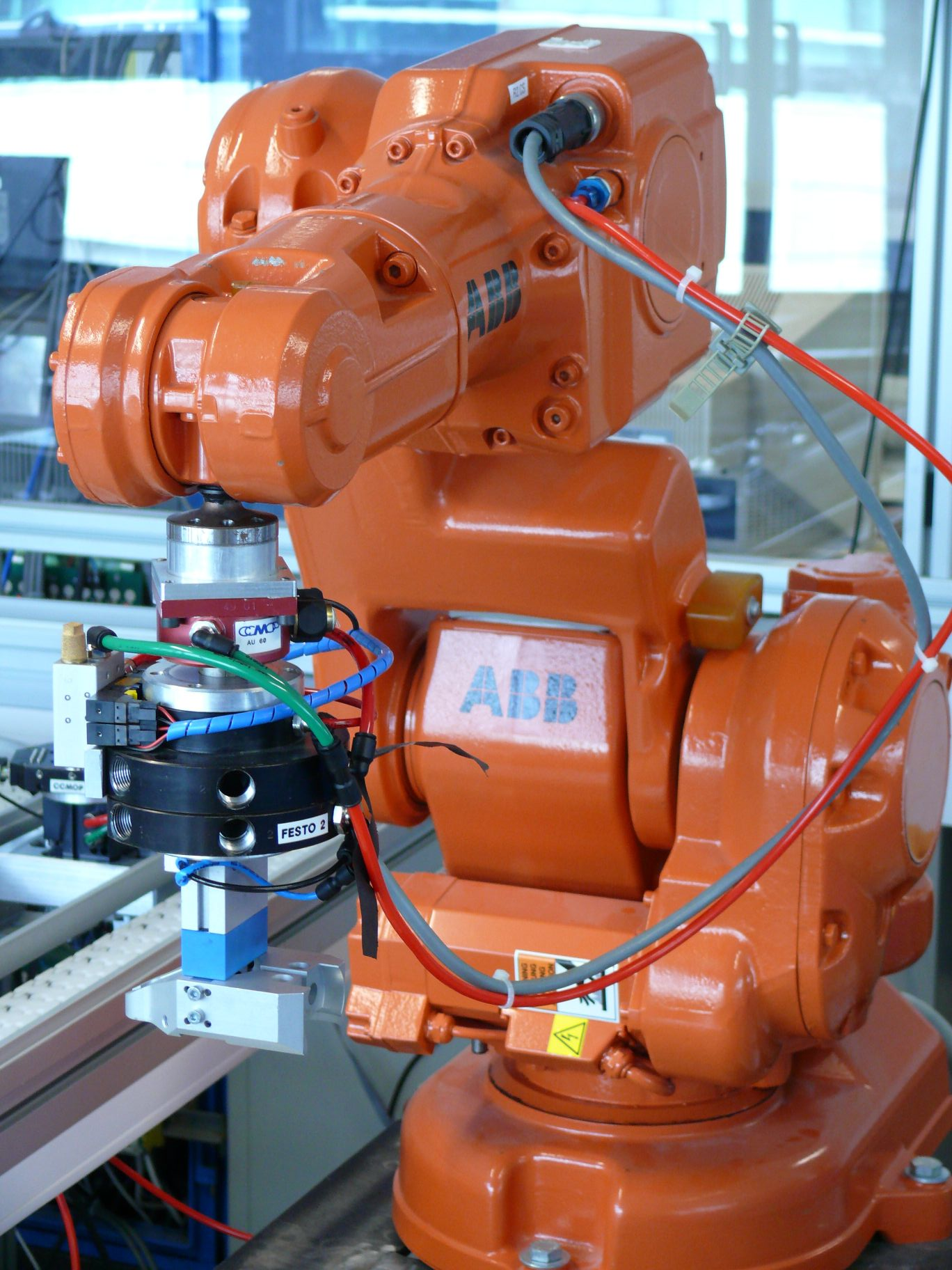
An ABB industrial robot

ABB's Robotics & Discrete Automation business area combines machine and factory automation systems, mainly from B&R, which ABB acquired in 2017, with a comprehensive robotics concepts and applications suite. ABB has installed over 300,000 robots globally. The Robotics & Discrete Automation business has been positioned to capture the opportunities associated with the "factory of the future" by providing services for flexible manufacturing and smart machinery.

According to a 2019 ABB press release, their automation business is #2 globally. In China, they hold a #1 position. ABB is planning on expanding its innovation and production capacity by investing in a new robotics factory in Shanghai.

=== Process automation ===
The Process Automation business area provides a range of automation, electrification and digital offerings for process, hybrid and maritime industries, including industry-specific integrated control and software, as well as measurement and analytics services.

== Former divisions ==
=== Power Grids ===
The Power Grids business area offered components for the transmission and distribution of electricity, and incorporated ABB's manufacturing network for transformers, switchgear, circuit breakers, and associated high voltage equipment such as digital protective relays. It also offered maintenance services.

A key part of Power Grids' offering were turnkey systems and service for power transmission and distribution grids and for power plants; this included electrical substations and substation automation systems, flexible AC transmission systems (FACTS), high-voltage direct current (HVDC) systems, and network management systems. The division was subdivided into the four business units High Voltage Products, Transformers, Grid Automation and Grid Integration.

In 2010, ABB's North American headquarters in Cary, North Carolina, announced a new partnership with Sensus of Raleigh, North Carolina, to develop technologies to work together on smart grids.

During 2014, ABB formed a joint venture with Hitachi to provide HVDC system solutions in Japan.

In December 2018, ABB and Hitachi announced that the latter would buy ABB's Power Grids division for roughly $6.4 billion. Hitachi officially acquired 80.1% of the business in July 2020. Initially known as Hitachi ABB Power Grids, the new Hitachi subsidiary was rebranded as Hitachi Energy in October 2021. The transaction was one of Hitachi's biggest-ever deals, as it shifted focus to a higher-growth market for electricity networks. Hitachi acquired the remainder of the company from ABB in 2022.

In July 2021, ABB confirmed the sale of its mechanical power transmission business, Dodge, to American company RBC Bearings Incorporated for $2.9 billion.

=== Rolling stock manufacturing ===
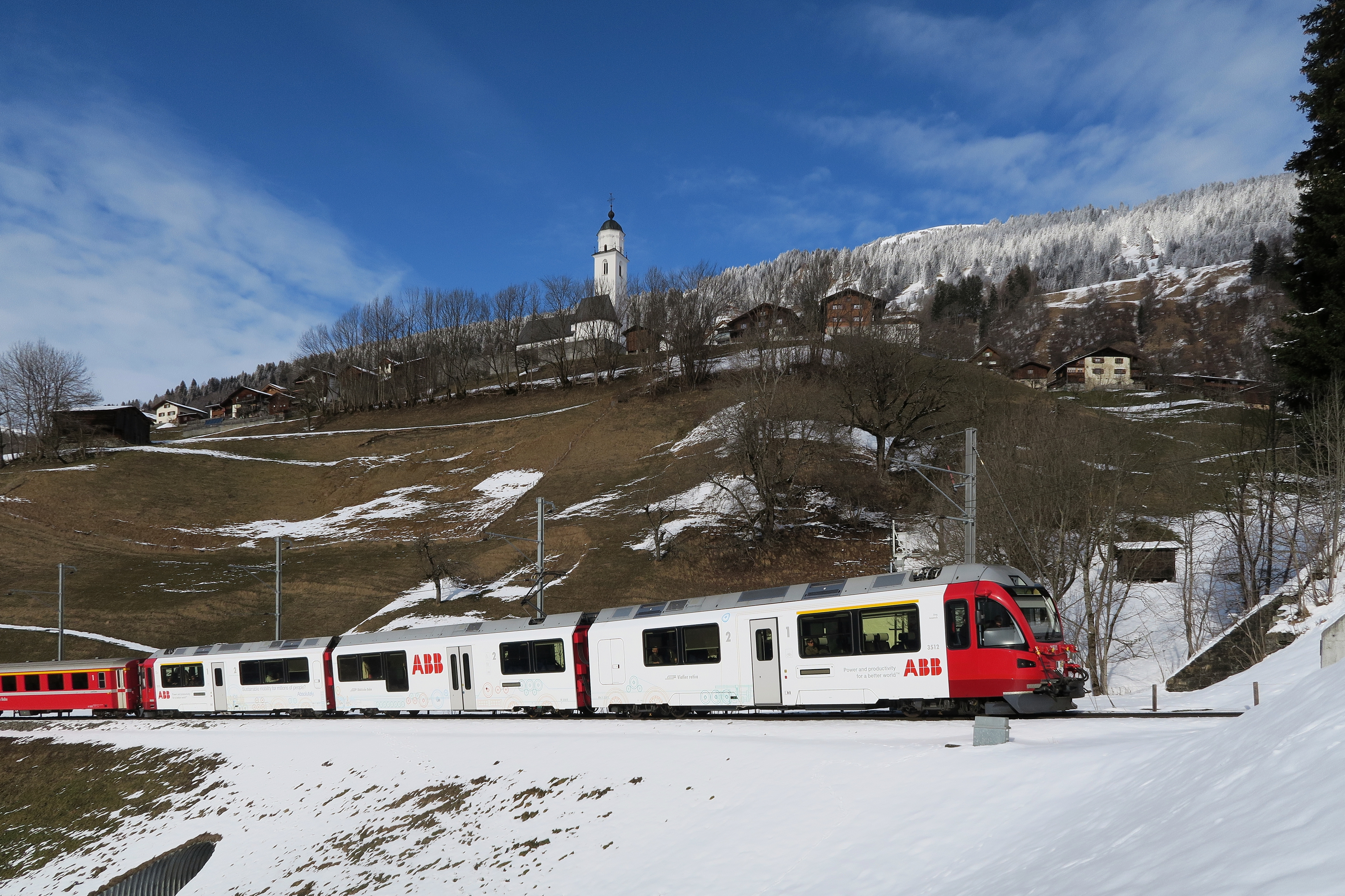
Train in Swiss Alps equipped with ABB technology

ABB Group entered the heavy rail rolling stock manufacturing market in 1989 through a 40% shareholding in a consortium, headed with Trafalgar House and some former British Rail employees, that purchased British Rail Engineering Limited (BREL), the formerly state-owned manufacturing arm of British Rail. BREL was the first division of British Rail to be privatised as part of a phased plan initiated by the third Thatcher ministry. ABB took over two rolling stock manufacturing facilities from BREL; the Derby Litchurch Lane Works and York Carriage Works. Additionally, ABB took over Crewe Works in a purely maintenance capacity. During September 1992, ABB Group purchased the stakes of the other members of the consortium to become the sole owner with the business rebranded ABB Transportation.

The first trains produced at either facility under ABB ownership were for an order for 22 three-carriage Class 320 electric multiple units, built at ABB York for Glasgow's suburban railways in 1990. That same year, ABB York finished an order for five similar four-car Class 322 units for the new Stansted Express service. Between 1990 and 1991, ABB York built 24 two-car Class 456 third rail trains for Network SouthEast services out of London Waterloo. A further order for 97 four-car Class 465 units was completed at ABB York for Network SouthEast services in and around Kent between 1991 and 1994. Numerous diesel multiple units were also built at ABB York, including 76 Class 165 suburban units for Chiltern Main Line and Great Western Main Line commuter services between 1990 and 1992, followed by 21 Class 166 three-car express units for longer-distance services out of London Paddington.

After initially focusing its resources on rolling stock refurbishment, the first new trains to roll off the production line at ABB Derby were the ten two-car Class 482 trains, built for the Waterloo & City line while it was still under the control of Network SouthEast (since transferred to the London Underground). In 1995, ABB Derby built 16 four-car Class 325 electric freight multiple units for the Royal Mail to replace their ageing fleet of parcels carriages. During the mid-1990s, in a bid to expand their international portfolio, both the Derby and York plants completed a number of ABB Eurotram light rail vehicles for the Strasbourg tramway in France. Around the same time, in a further diversification, ABB partnered with Brush Traction to construct the fleet of 46 Class 92 electric locomotives for hauling freight trains through the Channel Tunnel; ABB were involved in the design and construction of many components including the traction motors, while final assembly took place at Brush Works in Loughborough.

Concurrently, ABB expanded its international footprint into South Asia during July 1993 by signing a landmark contract with the Indian Railways to supply three-phase electric locomotives, leading to the development and delivery of the passenger-oriented WAP-5 and heavy-freight WAG-9 classes alongside a comprehensive transfer of technology agreement for indigenous production at the Chittaranjan Locomotive Works (CLW).

The last trains to roll off the production line at ABB York were an order for 41 four-carriage Class 365 electric multiple units for Connex South Eastern and West Anglia Great Northern services between 1994 and 1995. Following the privatisation of British Rail, ABB encountered a decline in train orders, largely due to increased competition from competing manufacturers and no longer having a monopoly on rolling stock production in the British market. Thus the business was rationalised; ABB York was closed in 1996 (it would later be reopened as a rail wagon manufacturing centre by the Thrall Car Manufacturing Company) and all manufacturing activity was relocated to ABB Derby, the operation of which was transferred to the Adtranz joint venture between ABB and DaimlerChrysler in 1996.

During 1997, Adtranz unveiled the Class 168 train for Chiltern Railways. The design of the Class 168 would subsequently be further developed into the Turbostar and Electrostar families of trains, which in turn became the most successful rolling stock design on post-privatisation British railways by number of units sold. During 1999, ABB sold its 50% stake in Adtranz to Daimler for $472 million, thus exiting the rolling stock manufacturing sector. Shortly thereafter, Daimler sold the Adtranz unit to Bombardier Transportation.

== Legacy brands ==
=== Bailey Controls ===
Founded in 1916 by Ervin G. Bailey, Bailey Controls developed the world's first steam boiler meter before becoming an industry leader in control and instrumentation of automated processes. In 1989, the company merged with the Italian Elsag Group which also produced automation control and instrumentation devices. Elsag Bailey Process Automation would be acquired by ABB in 1999.

=== Fischer & Porter ===
The Fischer & Porter Company was founded in 1937 being an industry leader in process instrumentation producing an industry-leading range of flow measurement products, along with devices to measure, indicate, and control other process variables including pressure (most famously the Fisher-Porter tube), temperature, level, and more. In 1994, Fischer & Porter was acquired by Elsag Bailey Process Automation, which in turn was acquired by ABB in 1999.

== Management ==
Since August 2024, Morten Wierod has been ABB's CEO. During September 2013, Ulrich Spiesshofer was named ABB's CEO, succeeding Joe Hogan.

In August 2019, ABB announced industrial veteran Björn Rosengren would take over as CEO starting March 2020. Rosengren was then CEO of Swedish mining-equipment giant Sandvik. In the meantime, ABB chairman Peter Voser was appointed interim CEO in April 2019, succeeding Ulrich Spiesshofer, who stepped down after five-and-a-half years. Voser was elected chairman in April 2015 and succeeded Hubertus von Grünberg, who had been chairman since May 2007. Jürgen Dormann was chairman from 2002 to 2007, and Percy Barnevik from 1999 to 2002.

== Ownership ==
As of 2026, the largest single stake in ABB is owned by the Swedish investment company Investor AB, controlled by the Wallenberg family, which holds 14.6%. This is followed by UBS Fund Management at 5.001%, BlackRock, Inc. at 4.17%, and activist investor Cevian at 3%.

== Controversy and litigation ==
In December 2022, ABB was charged by the U.S. Securities and Exchange Commission for violations of the Foreign Corrupt Practices Act in a bribery scheme in South Africa. It was ordered to pay a total of $460 million to U.S. authorities to settle criminal and civil charges. ABB paid more than $37 million in bribes to a high-ranking Eskom official to influence contracts awarded by the state-owned electric utility company for work on the Kusile Power Station project between 2014 and 2017. The official had influence over the awarding of contracts for power projects in the country. In exchange for the bribes, ABB secured a $160 million contract to provide services related to cabling and installation work at Eskom's Kusile Power Station, one of the largest coal-fired power plants in the world.

In a parallel case, the United States Department of Justice fined ABB $315 million to settle criminal charges. ABB had to pay $75 million in civil penalties to settle the SEC's charges. It was fined 4 million Francs by Swiss authorities. ABB also agreed to repay $104 million to Eskom it was paid in connection with Kusile.

In January 2024, the United States House Committee on Homeland Security and the United States House Select Committee on Strategic Competition between the United States and the Chinese Communist Party announced an investigation into ABB regarding equipment sold to Chinese state-owned crane manufacturer ZPMC. In their joint investigation, the committees concluded that ZPMC-manufactured cargo cranes presented a significant cybersecurity and national security threat to the USA and its allies.

== See also ==
- GREEN Cell Shipping
- Legrand
- Strömberg
