= GREEN Cell Shipping =

The GREEN cell shipping concept is a new concept for powering merchant shipping vessels using containerized power units and a global logistics chain to manage these containers. GREEN cell stands for Global Renewable Electrical Energy Network cell. The concept resulted from a thought experiment process involving engineers working for the ABB Group that took place on March 13, 2009, in Oslo, Norway. The concept was subsequently introduced in an ABB magazine, and remains under development, as part of an open innovation process.

== Background ==
The propulsion of merchant ships is responsible for approximately 4% of global carbon-dioxide emissions. The industry itself estimated its carbon footprint at 3.3% in 2007. The industry responded officially as early as 2003 by calling for measures to limit or reduce the emissions from international shipping. In order to envision solutions to this challenge, a team of engineers and consultants associated with ABB set up a thought experiment that would pose the question: "How could you power the commercial fleet without fossil fuels?" The core team consisted of three electrical engineers: Jaakko Aho, Jukka Varis and Klaus Vänskä, all of Finland. This group laid down a core set of design principles around fossil-free marine propulsion, and described a hypothetical system that was later called the GREEN Cell shipping concept.

== The GREEN Cell ==
The GREEN Cell is at the core of the shipping concept. Each GREEN cell is envisaged as a container-sized source of electricity, based on inherent chemical energy (battery), in addition to solar energy and wind energy. Each cell provides electricity to the ship's network. The electrical power potential of each GREEN cell depends on the sum of the power in the battery, the size of solar panel area obtained, the efficiency of the solar panel and the efficiency of the wind power system.

=== Solar power ===
Initial designs for a GREEN cell proposed that each GREEN Cell opens two doors length-wise, thus covering neighboring containers as well. The inside of the doors, and much of the exposed surface of the container are mounted with solar panels. Thus, a typical container ship could cover its entire surface with solar energy panels. One GREEN Cell produces as much as 1,000 sq ft (93 m^{2}) of solar panel surface area. This equates to roughly 12 kW. 100 such containers could thus conceivably produce 1.2 MW. Alternate calculations show that such a system would retrieve 500 Watts per m^{2}. Multiplied by the approximately 20,000 m^{2} of surface area on a large container ship like Emma Maersk would give 10 MW of solar energy.

=== Wind power ===
An extendable vertical-axis windmill emerges from one side of the container. A vertical-axis windmill is preferred as it introduces less resistance to the forward motion of the ship and disturbs ship stability less than horizontal-axis windmills.

=== Stored chemical power ===
The battery of the GREEN cell takes up the remainder of the space in the container. Designers describe the potential battery as either an optimised lithium-ion battery, or a sodium-sulfur one.

== The GREEN Cell network ==
=== GREEN Cell ships ===
Like a ship that takes refrigerated containers, a GREEN Cell-equipped ship would have an electrical connection to a number of containers. In this case, instead of feeding electricity to the refrigerated units, the ship would pull power from the containers. The GREEN Cell ship carries as many as several hundred GREEN Cells, adding weight to the ship and subtracting from available cargo space. Conversely, the GREEN Cell ship forgoes a typical diesel engine (weighing roughly 75 tons), a frequency converter (weighing roughly 25 tons) and petroleum fuel tanks (as much as 3000 tons).

=== GREEN Cell hubs ===
A network of floating power stations placed along major trade routes either recharge a ship's GREEN Cells, or simply switch them out (like a traditional container port). These create electricity from green sources like wave power generators, wind turbines, a flywheel-driving water density column, solar panels and current-driven turbines.

=== Shoreside GREEN Cell centres ===
Container terminals carry a large supply of ready-to-go GREEN Cells. These switch out GREEN Cells on ships just like a container port unloads and reloads a container ship. Thus the GREEN Cell system serves both deepsea merchant marine traffic and coastal cabotage.
