= Matson (surname) =

Matson is an English-language surname of multiple possible origins. Notable people with the surname include:

- Aaron Matson (1770–1855), U.S. Representative from New Hampshire
- April Matson (born 1981), American actress
- Boyd Matson (born 1947), American TV anchor
- Canute R. Matson (1843–1903), Norwegian-born American politician
- Chelsey Matson (born 1982), Canadian curler
- Courtland C. Matson (1841–1915), U.S. Representative from Indiana
- Frank Matson (1905–1985), Welsh footballer
- Harold Matson (1898–1988), American literary agent
- Johnny Matson (born 1951), professor of psychology at Louisiana State University
- Leroy E. Matson (1896–1950), American jurist
- Lurline Matson Roth, American heiress, equestrian, philanthropist from San Francisco.
- Margaret Matson, alleged witch in 17th-century Pennsylvania
- Michael Matson (born 1984), American adventurer
- Ollie Matson (1930–2011), American football player and sprinter
- Pamela Matson (born 1953), dean of the School of Earth Sciences at Stanford University
- Pat Matson (born 1944), American Football League and National Football League offensive lineman
- Phil Matson (1884–1928), Australian rules football player and coach
- Randy Matson (born 1945), American shot putter and Olympic gold medalist
- Taylor Matson (born 1988), American professional ice hockey player
- Victor Matson (1895–1972), American painter
- William Matson (1849–1917), founder of the Matson Navigation Company
