= Brad Mattson =

American engineer and entrepreneur

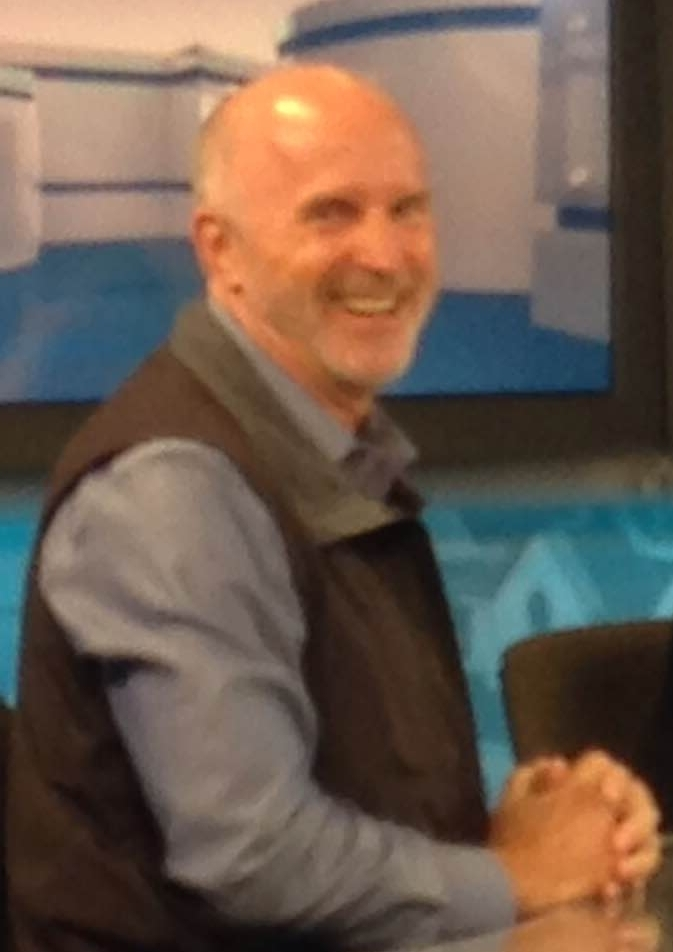
- Brad Mattson, in 2015.
- Born: October 29, 1954 (age 71); Norwood, Massachusetts, United States
- Education: Mt. Pleasant High School
- Alma mater: San Jose State University; Santa Clara University
- Occupations: Entrepreneur, engineer, inventor
- Known for: Siva Power, Mattson Technology, Novellus Systems, Husk Power Systems, SEMI, Santa Clara University
- Title: Board Director of Siva Power, Chairman of Husk Power Systems

Brad Mattson (born October 29, 1954) is an American engineer and entrepreneur. He started two publicly traded semiconductor companies, Novellus Systems and Mattson Technology, and has also worked in the solar power industry. He currently serves as Chairman of Husk Power and is a board director at Siva Power, a thin film solar cell company based in Silicon Valley, and is involved with several other private companies and non-profits. Mattson holds 12 patents.

== Early life and education ==
Mattson was born in Norwood, Massachusetts on October 29, 1954, and grew up in California. He graduated from San Jose State University with a BSc in aeronautical engineering. Mattson also holds an MBA in Finance from Santa Clara University.

== Semiconductor career ==
=== Applied materials ===
After graduating San Jose State University, Mattson took a job with Applied Materials as a field service engineer. Mattson repositioned his career into product management and marketing, eventually becoming a product manager and then director of marketing for Applied Materials' etch division.

In the late 1970s there was no commonly accepted method that would forecast the total cost of ownership that spanned the equipment's lifetime once all costs were considered. To help solve this problem Mattson developed a cost of ownership (COO) model for Applied.

Mattson left Applied after about five years to become VP for the plasma systems group of Laboratory for Electronics (LFE) in Massachusetts.

=== Novellus Systems ===
Mattson resigned his position at LFE in the early 1980s and started his own company, Novellus Systems to make chemical vapor deposition (CVD) systems. Novellus would eventually achieve a market capitalization over $3B, becoming one of the largest semiconductor equipment companies in the world.

Mattson incorporated Novellus in 1984. In the early 1980s the semiconductor industry was in a downturn and there were many layoffs, so Mattson had difficulty raising outside funding, instead funding it with his own money. At Novellus, Mattson designed and built the company's first two prototype CVD systems. At the time, CVD equipment was achieving about ±5 percent uniformity on 6-inch wafers, but Novellus prototypes were achieving one percent uniformity on 8-inch wafers that were processed ten-times faster. Eventually Mattson secured an investment from Monsanto, who sold wafers to the semiconductor industry.

With new financing to expand operations, Mattson grew Novellus into one of the top three CVD equipment companies in the late 1980s. Novellus supplied CVD systems to semiconductor producers like Motorola, Advanced Micro Devices, NEC, and LSI Logic. Four years after its founding, Novellus had its IPO on NASDAQ in August 1988. Novellus Systems was acquired by Lam Research in 2011 for $3.3 billion

=== Mattson Technology ===
While taking a break from work in the late 1980s, Mattson began investing in companies on the side. Mattson was working with one company to develop stripping hardware designs for wafers. Mattson become more directly involved with the company, and the firm was incorporated as Mattson Technology with Mattson as CEO in 1988. Mattson Technology became a publicly traded company in 1994. In 2001, Mattson stepped aside as CEO of Mattson Technology but remained as Vice Chairman until 2002.

While at the company, Mattson was a finalist for the Ernst & Young Entrepreneur of the Year Award of Northern California in the "High Technology-Electronics" category.

== Renewable energy career ==
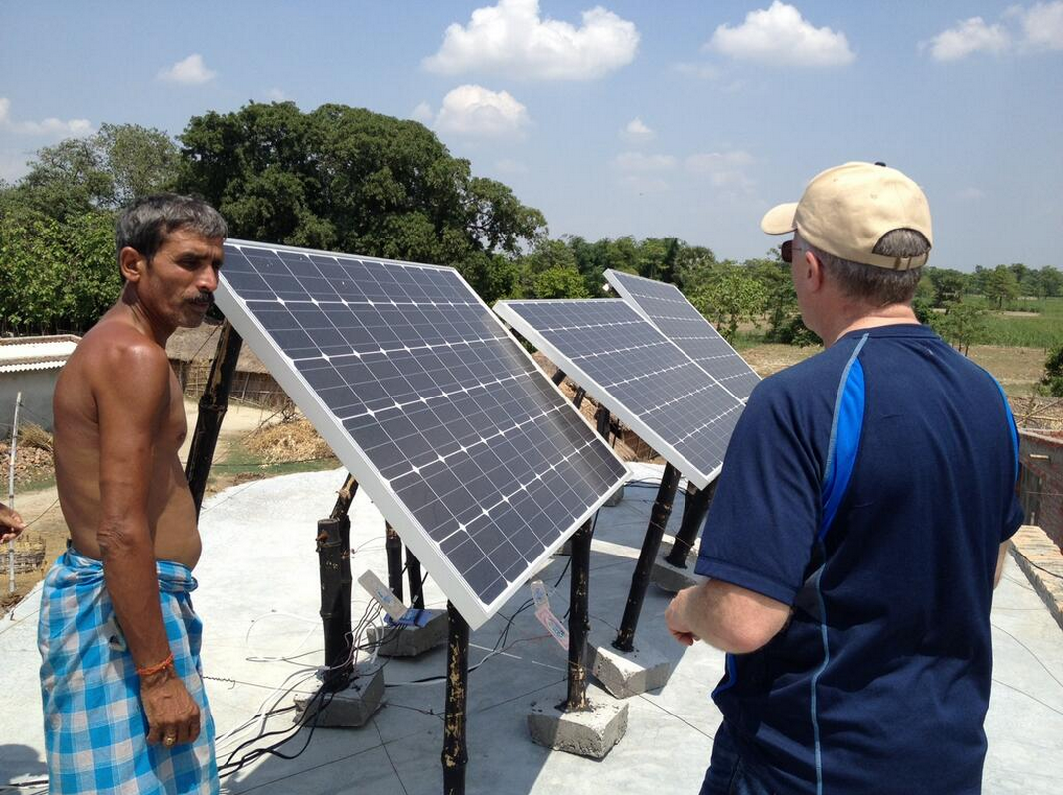
Mattson working with Husk Power Systems installing solar panels in off-grid locations in India.

According to Mattson, the September 11 attacks strongly influenced his thinking about whether or not his work was actually helping people and making the world a better place, or if he was only working with already "really successful countries and successful companies" despite his wanting "to see technology benefit humanity in a more direct way." That same year, Mattson served as a judge for The Tech Awards's Environment category and the theme of "technology benefiting humanity".

In 2009 Mattson became a partner at VantagePoint Capital Partners, a venture capital firm that focuses on renewable energy and cleantech.

In 2011 Mattson became CEO of Siva Power, but what was then Solexant, a solar startup developing cadmium telluride solar panels. Mattson halted the company's plans to build a factory in Oregon, and instead ramped-up R&D to develop copper indium gallium selenide (CIGS) solar technology. After two years Mattson unveiled the new company as Siva Power in 2013. In 2017, Bruce Sohn, the former President of First Solar became CEO of Siva Power, with Mattson serving as Executive Chairman of the Board.

In 2014, Mattson self published a book, The Solar Phoenix: How America Can Rise from the Ashes of Solyndra to World Leadership in Solar 2.0, in which he explains why he believes solar is fundamental to the world's energy future and the industry's place in the United States.

== Public speaking and mentoring ==
Mattson speaks and presents at organizations devoted to energy and humanitarianism, such as Intersolar, Greentech Media Solar Summits, the Rotary Club, IEEE, U. S. Department of Energy conferences, and the Commonwealth Club of California, where he spoke alongside Jigar Shah. Mattson has also given guest lectures at Santa Clara University and UC Berkeley on sustainability, business, and engineering.

A graduate of Santa Clara University, Mattson served as a member on the Board of Regents and also served as an Advisory Board Member for the university's Center for Science, Technology, and Society (CSTS). Mattson has also worked with the CSTS Global Social Benefit Incubator. Most of the companies Mattson advised were involved in renewable energy, such as Husk Power Systems, blueEnergy, and ToughStuff. Mattson has served as chairman of the Board of Husk Power since 2013.

== Patents ==
- Plasma Contamination Removal Process, United States 5,198,634
- Inductive Plasma Reactor, United States 5,811,022
- System & Method for Thermal Processing, United States 6,002,109
- System & Method for Thermal Processing, United States 6,043,460
- System & Method for Thermal Processing, United States 6,046,439
- Method & Apparatus for Thermal Processing, United States 6,133,550
- Inductive Plasma Reactor, United States 6,143,129
- System & Method for Thermal Processing, United States 6,172,337
- Apparatus & Method for Thermal Processing, United States 6,342,691
- Method & Apparatus for Thermal Processing, United States 6,355,909
- Method & Apparatus for Thermal Processing, United States 6,399,921
- System & Method for Thermal Processing, United States 6,403,925
