= RESOL =

RESOL – Elektronische Regelungen GmbH
- Company type: GmbH (~ Ltd. Liability Company)
- Industry: Solar thermal control technology
- Founded: 1977
- Founder: Rudolf Pfeil
- Headquarters: Hattingen, NRW, Germany
- Area served: International
- Key people: owner / General Manager = Rudolf Pfeil
- Products: Solar controllers, pump stations, additional modules and related accessories
- Number of employees: 160 (2009)
- Website: resol.com

RESOL (Elektronische Regelungen GmbH) is a German solar thermal technology company based in Hattingen, Germany. Their product lines include solar thermal controllers, pump stations, and a range of additional modules and accessories. 100% of the company is owned by its founder and General Manager, Rudolf Pfeil.

== History ==
RESOL was founded in Hattingen in 1977, where the founder produced the first solar controllers in his own private flat. A few years later, the enterprise moved to the neighboring town of Sprockhövel, but moved back to Hattingen into a new building in 1998. In 2007, another new building was added, and currently (April 2009) an annexe to the first plant is being built. It will be inaugurated in summer, increasing the total plant and office space to 6,600 m².

In 2009, RESOL employed 160 people, and in 2008, turnover of 29 million euros was generated.

== Growth through process management ==
In the 32 years since its founding, RESOL has grown from a one-man-company into an enterprise with several global subsidiaries. Especially in the 2000s, the growth rate increased, leading to a record growth rate of nearly 80% in 2008.

Crucial for this development was the implementation of intensive process management, which started in 2005. With the help of a consultancy firm that specializes in the implementation of synchronous production systems on the basis of the Toyota Production System, the assembly lines were turned from a manufactory into a flexible, efficient industrial production facility. Process chains have been streamlined, workplace layouts have changed radically and cycle times have been shortened considerably.

Due to the implementation of the synchronous production, the turnover generated by RESOL increased by more than 400%.

== Locations ==
Research and development, production as well as administration take place at the RESOL headquarters in Hattingen, Germany.

RESOL has subsidiaries in France and Spain as well as agencies in the UK, Sweden and Bulgaria. Authorized distributors sell RESOL products in Italy, Poland, the Czech Republic, Russia, the Netherlands, Portugal, Jordan, Iran, the United Arab Emirates, the US, Canada and Japan.

Due to several strategic partnerships with companies that distribute RESOL products under their own brands as OEM clients, controllers made by RESOL can be found in more than 50 countries worldwide.

== Awards ==
For outstanding commitment to the generation and usage of solar energy, RESOL was awarded the title „Solar-Unternehmen 2000” (solar company 2000) by the „Solar-Unternehmen 2001+” initiative.

In 2001, the FlowCon Pro pump station was presented with the IF Design Award, awarded by the iF International Forum Design GmbH. In 2008, the award again came to Hattingen, this time for the FlowCon D pump station.

The FlowCon Pro pump station also won the ISH Design Plus Award.

Several RESOL products have been presented with the Red dot design award of the Design Zentrum Nordrhein Westfalen, for example, the solar controllers RS600 MIDI and DeltaSol A as well as the FlowCon S pump station.

At the Intersolar trade fair in Munich, May 2009, the newly developed RESOL FlowCon Sensor pump station was presented with the Intersolar Award in the solar thermal category.
