= Husk Power Systems =

Electrical energy producer

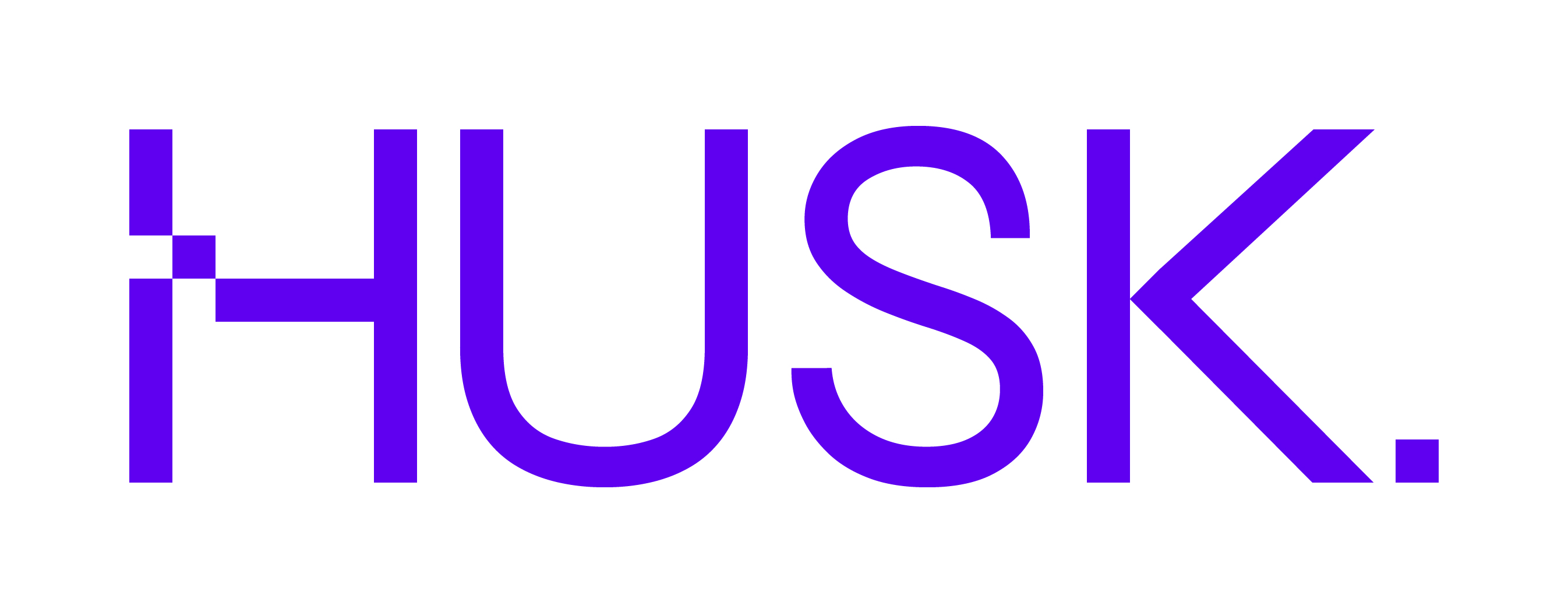
- Industry: Energy industry
- Headquarters: Fort Collins, Colorado, United States; Patna, Bihar, India
- Products: Solar and biomass rural microgrids / mini-grids
- Revenue: US$ 10 million
- Website: https://huskpowersystems.com/

Husk Power, founded in 2008, is a company based in Fort Collins, Colorado, US, that provides clean energy to unserved and underserved (off-grid or weak grid) communities in sub-Saharan Africa and South Asia. It has three customers: 1) communities that access power through solar mini-grids/micro-grids, 2) businesses using commercial and industrial (C&I) solar, and 3) households adopting residential rooftop solar.

Husk's original technology generated electricity using a biomass gasifier that created fuel from rice husks (hence the company's name), a waste product of rice hullers that separate the husks as chaff from the rice, a staple food in both Asia and Africa. In the mid-2010s, with the rapid decline in the price of solar PV and batteries, Husk pivoted its business model to focus more on solar-plus-storage mini-grids (what at the time Husk coined "mini power plants"), while continuing to use biomass in combination with solar to serve communities with larger electricity demand. In 2025, Husk announced an evolution of its business to become a distributed energy resources (DER) platform, setting a target of deploying 2GW of assets by 2030.

Husk was named one of the World's 50 Most Innovative Companies by Fast Company, ranking #1 among energy companies on the list. It was recognized in the REN21 Renewables Global Status Report as the first mini-grid company to achieve significant scale, by surpassing 100 solar hybrid community mini-grids, and 5,000 small business customers. In 2022, Husk signed an Energy Compact with the United Nations, in which it set a target of building 5,000 mini-grids and connecting at least 1 million customers by 2030.

The company was co-founded by Manoj Sinha (currently CEO), Gyanesh Pandey, Ratnesh Yadav, and Chip Ransler. Chairman of the Board is Brad Mattson.

== Need ==
According to the World Bank, about 800 million people worldwide have no access to electricity, with the majority of those people located in Sub-Saharan Africa. Millions of people die each year as a result of indoor air pollution caused by the combustion of traditional fuels used for cooking, heating and lighting. The largest population without electricity in Sub-Saharan Africa, about 90 million people, is in Nigeria, where both businesses and households are not connected to the electric grid, and even those who are connected often receive erratic service due to the lack of generating capacity. For off-grid and weak grid areas, this absence of the grid has resulted in a massive diesel generation economy. This scenario is repeated across Sub-Saharan Africa, parts of Southeast and South Asia and island states. The World Bank adds that mini-grids have the potential to serve 490 million people globally, and that achieving such scale would require 210,000 mini-grids and $220 billion. Currently, the industry has attracted $5 billion, with 19,000 mini-grids built.

== Concept ==
Current CEO and co-founder Manoj Sinha, named one of the 2022 Global Energy Elites and Meaningful Business 100 for his pioneering work, was responsible for evolving Husk's approach to take advantage of the steep decline in solar prices. By adding solar to biomass, Husk was able to provide 24/7 100% renewable energy to its customers, using solar during daytime, biomass in the evening and batteries at night. According to a Harvard Business School Case Study: "From 2007 through 2013, Husk built 80 biomass waste (primarily rice husk from rice mills) plants that provided electricity to 250,000 villagers and shop owners spread across 350 villages in India and Africa. By 2015, Husk underwent a major pivot. Rather than a rural electrification vision aimed at providing power to rural households through biomass gasification alone, Sinha envisioned plants organized around village commercial customers that used biomass gasification, solar energy, and battery power in tandem, allowing for power generation nearly 24-7. To bring this vision to reality, Sinha ceased operations of nearly all of the existing plant locations and began the conversion to new locations built around the 'new' hybrid plant. Thus in 2015, Husk was operating a mere 10 power plants and serving roughly 2,000 customers, down from the 80 plants and roughly 250,000 customers they had prior to this shift." In 2022, it had more 150 power plants in operation.

Founding CEO Gyanesh Pandey, an electrical engineer who graduated from Indian Institute of Technology (BHU) Varanasi and then earned a master's at Rensselaer Polytechnic Institute, left a job in the United States and returned to India. There he worked with Ratnesh Yadav on business ideas to serve the needs of the poor in India, with their initial unsuccessful ideas including the development of solar-powered lights and the use of jatropha seeds to create biodiesel fuel. After a chance meeting with a gasifier salesman, the two conceived of using rice husks, the unused detritus of the rice hulling process, as an input source. Estimates are that 1.8 billion kilograms (4 billion pounds) of rice husks are left over from rice processing in Bihar each year and almost all of it had previously been used unproductively as there had been no uses identified for it. Pandey focused on the development of the circuitry that would allow the systems to most efficiently generate power, working with the Ministry of New and Renewable Energy to optimize the gasifier to use rice husks alone, then using the output of the gasifier to fuel a generator and assembling a crude local power distribution network that they built for the village of Tamkuha, which went live in August 2007.

== Application ==
Unlike solar home systems that provide basic services like lighting and phone charging, Husk Power serves the entire rural economy, with mini-grids at the center of the company's business model. It serves both completely rural off-grid areas, which have in the past only been able to use diesel generation to power their businesses and livelihoods, and it serves weak grid areas where the main grid (distribution companies or power utilities often referred to as "Discoms" in India, and "Discos" in Africa) provide unreliable and/or poor quality connections. Aside from building, owning and operating the power plant, Husk also builds and operates the transmission and distribution (T&D) network, which includes smart meters. The company has integrated internet of things (IoT) and machine learning into its infrastructure, which allows for largely automated operations as well as demand forecasting.

The solar hybrid microgrids developed by the company have an average generation capacity of 50 kW. Designed in a modular fashion, generation capacity can easily grow as demand grows. The electricity generated is able to power the needs of an entire community, including commercial and household demand, as well as "productive use" applications such as drinking water filtration and bottling, grain milling, welding, cold chain, etc. If the system adds gasification, the rice husks used to fuel the process are purchased from local rice mills. Based on experience in India and Nigeria, customers that switch from diesel generation to solar power from the mini-grids save about 30% on the monthly energy bill.

The revenue model for customers is pay-as-you-go. Payment is made digitally, thought the company's app, called Huskify, which also allows customers to see their energy usage in real time.

Besides providing electricity, Husk Power also provides financing to customers to purchase energy efficient appliances, either for household or commercial use. During its 15 years building mini-grids, Husk developed an engineering, procurement and construction (EPC) capacity, and uses that to install turnkey rooftop solar systems for rural commercial and industrial customers (C&I) who want a captive system that is separate from the mini-grid.

== Impact ==
Each microgrid connects hundreds of customers, including micro, small and medium-sized enterprises (MSMEs), households and institutions such as schools and health clinics, and benefits thousands more, through street lighting and other community-based services. Village life can go beyond daylime as shops can now stay open later, which promotes increased revenue. Students can also use the electricity generated to study into the night. Each plant provides local jobs, which creates opportunities for farmers and entrepreneurs. Local residents are employed as technicians, salespeople and for plant security.

== Finance ==
Husk Power has raised three rounds of equity to date, totalling about $30 million. In 2018, it raised a Series C equity totaling $20 million from Shell Ventures, Swedfund International and Engie Rassembleurs d'Energies, with FMO coming in later with an additional $5 million. Other investors have included The Rockefeller Foundation, Acumen, US International Development Finance Corp. and First Solar. In 2022, Husk also raised more than $10 million in debt for project financing in India, from EU-funded EDFI-ElectriFI and the India Renewable Energy Development Agency (IREDA).

Early on, Charles "Chip" Ransler and Manoj Sinha, then students at the Darden Graduate School of Business Administration at the University of Virginia, developed a business plan that earned $60,000 from social innovation competitions sponsored by Darden and by the University of Texas. In 2009, the company won an inaugural global business plan competition sponsored by venture capital firm Draper Fisher Jurvetson and Cisco Systems and will receive a $250,000 investment from the two firms to help improve the basic technology that the firm has already developed. The company has since received two rounds of financing from the Shell Foundation.

== Service area ==
As of 2022, Husk Power Systems had nearly 150 operational renewable energy mini-grids in India, located in the states of Bihar and Uttar Pradesh. Solar PV serves customers during the day, with biomass providing up to eight hours of power, primarily during the evening hours. Battery power is available for nighttime use. The company is also planning further expansion to additional states in India, as well as other countries in Southeast Asia and Africa, where the combination of power shortages in rural areas and availability of ample sunshine and/or waste rice husks make the generating systems an effective solution. In September 2023, at the Africa Climate Summit, Husk launched an initiative called 'Africa Sunshot,' aiming to install 2,500 solar minigrids over 5 years to supercharge low-carbon economic growth in rural Sub-Saharan Africa.

== See also ==
- Electricity sector in India
- Renewable energy in India
- Biofuels by region
