= Michael Matson =

American Ocean rower and author

Michael "Mike" Matson (born November 5, 1984) is an American ocean rower and author who holds 2 Guinness World Records.

== 2016 Talisker Whisky Atlantic Challenge – American Oarsmen ==
Michael and fellow Rice University Rowing club coach, David Alviar, entered the 2015 Atlantic Rowing Race (Talisker Whiskey Atlantic Challenge) as an awareness campaign to fund the first rowing boathouse within the City of Houston. The duo worked in conjunction with the Buffalo Bayou Partnership and Texas Dragon Boat Association to successfully construct Houston's first boathouse. Their boat was named Anne, in honor of Anne McCormick Sullivan, a firefighter friend of Michael who gave her life in the tragic Southwest Inn fire. Unfortunately, Michael tore his Patellar tendon, and the team delayed to the 2016 race. With the Rice boathouse funded, the team added a third member, Brian Krauskopf, and changed names to the American Oarsmen. The team's crossing was listed as one of the "16 things to look forward to in 2016" according to the Houston Chronicle. The team left La Gomera on December 14, 2016, and arrived at Nelson's Dockyard in Antigua after 49 days, 14 hours, 4 minutes, and 20 seconds at sea. The team interacted with students via satellite phone before and during the crossing. This crossing earned the crew 2 Guinness World Records for being both the (1) First and the (2) Fastest trio (or three-manned rowboat) to cross the Atlantic.

== Other information ==
Michael holds a PhD in Chemistry from Rice University and is the author of Inorganic chemistry for Dummies.
