= Fisher-Porter tube =

Glass pressure vessel

Catalytic hydrogenation in a Fisher-Porter tube

A Fisher-Porter tube or Fisher-Porter vessel is a glass pressure vessel used in the chemical laboratory. The reaction vessel consists of a lipped heavy-wall borosilicate glass tube and a lid made from stainless steel. The lid is sealed with an o-ring and held in place with a coupling.

The advantage over steel autoclaves is that the progress of a reaction can be followed by eye. The maximum pressure that can be achieved is much lower than that in a metal bomb. For example, typical pressure ratings are 7 bar for a large 335 mL Fisher-Porter vessel and 15 bar for a small 90 mL one, whereas the usual kind of bomb is safe to use with 200 bar. Illustrative applications involve reactions at elevated temperatures using volatile reagents.

== Name ==
The name has become something of a genericised trademark. For decades these flasks used to be made by the Fisher & Porter Company until it became a part of ABB. Nowadays they are sold by Andrews Glass under the Lab-Crest label.

== Alternatives ==
Ace Glass offers thick-walled glass tubes with their proprietary Ace-Thred screw caps. Caps are available to fit gas plunger valves to admit gases under pressure. Similar arrangements are available from Q Labtech and sold through Sigma-Aldrich.
