= Mattson Lake =

Lake in the state of Minnesota, United States

- Location within Minnesota
- Location: Douglas County, Minnesota
- Coordinates: 45°46′27″N 95°35′2″W
- Type: lake

Mattson Lake is a lake in Douglas County, in the U.S. state of Minnesota.

Mattson Lake was named for John Mattson, a pioneer who settled in the area in 1868.

== See also ==
- List of lakes in Minnesota
