= Ultraviolet thermal processing =

In electronics manufacturing, ultraviolet thermal processing (UVTP) is the process of using ultraviolet light to stabilize dielectric films used to insulate semiconductors.

== Description ==
Semiconductor films need low dielectric constants (k-values) for optimal thermal conductivity, to ensure semiconductor scaling. Newer dielectric films used to insulate modern chips can be easily damaged, causing them to lose their insulating capacity. Specialized treatments applied with ultraviolet light improve chip performance. Tungsten halogen lamps are the sources used for traditional rapid thermal processing.
