= World Childhood Foundation =

Swedish organization

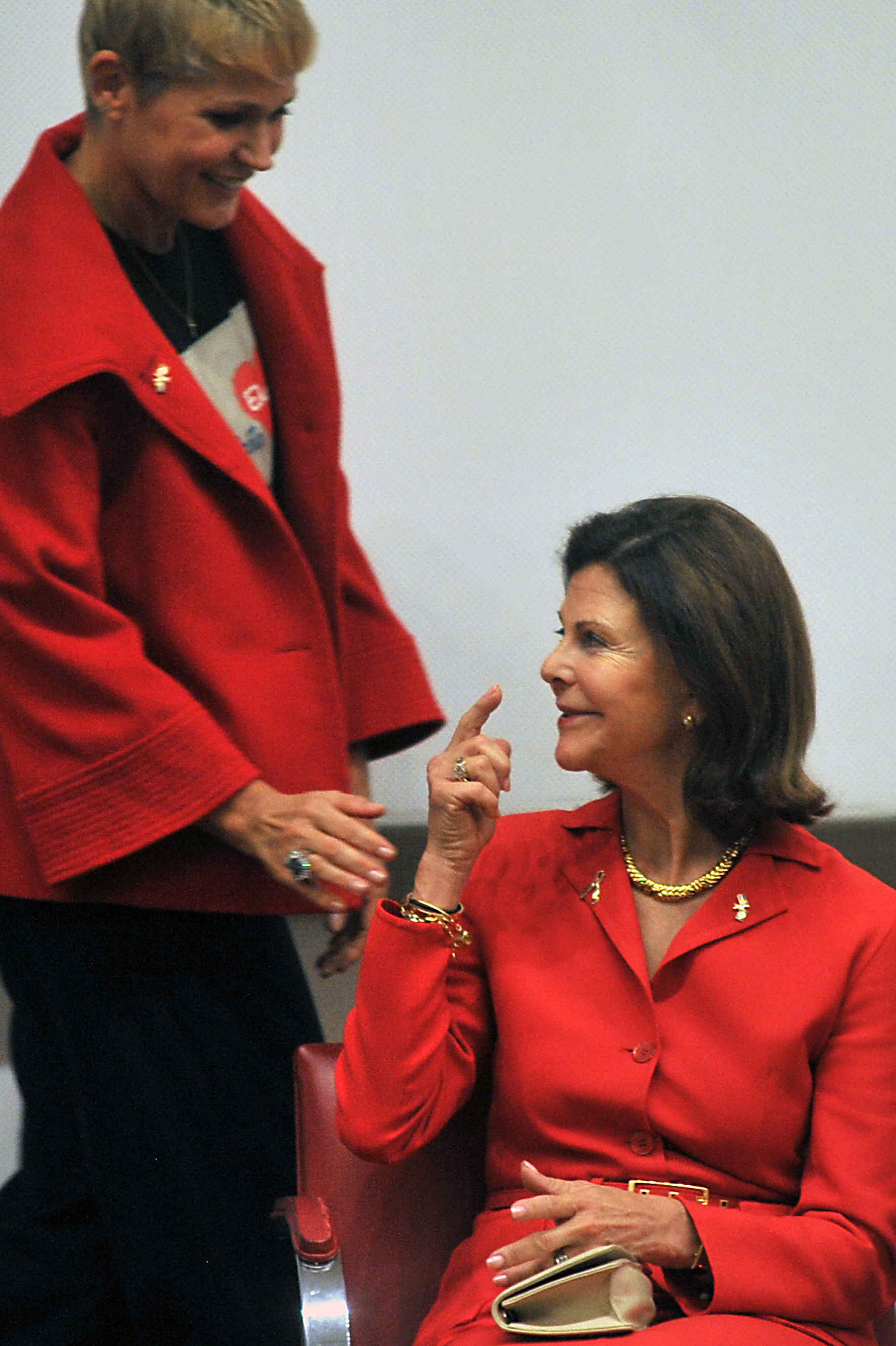
Queen Silvia of Sweden and Xuxa, in the Chamber of Deputies of Brazil in Brasília

The World Childhood Foundation, often referred to as simply Childhood, was founded by Queen Silvia of Sweden in 1999 in an effort to reach and support children at risk around the world. The foundation's focus is on protecting children from sexual abuse as well as helping those who have already fallen victim, with a concentration on girls and young mothers.

Childhood currently supports over 115 programs in 17 countries, including Belarus, Brazil, Estonia, Germany, Latvia, Lithuania, Moldova, Nepal, Poland, Russia, South Africa, Sweden, Thailand, Ukraine and the United States. The foundation also works actively to raise awareness about children's rights and to spread information about the exploitation of children taking place around the world. Childhood has offices in São Paulo, Brazil, New York City, USA and Munich/Berlin, Germany. The foundation's headquarters are in Stockholm, Sweden. The Secretary General of the foundation is Anna De Geer.

Childhood was started by a group called Co-Founders, each of whom contributed $1 million. These are ABB, The Axel Johnson Group, The Barbro E. Heinz Family, The Charles B. Wang Foundation, The Curtis L. Carlson Family Foundation, The DaimlerChrysler Corporation Fund, Heimbold Foundation, The Jan H. Stenbeck Family, The Jane and Dan Olsson Family, The Oriflame - af Jochnick Foundation, SAP AG, Skandia, Sven-Philip Sörensen Family, and The TeliaSonera AB.

Childhood has a focus on corporate responsibility and has, since 1999, engaged a long list of corporate sponsors who have contributed not only through direct monetary donations but also through integrating Childhood into their advertising and branding strategies. So-called Major Partner companies have each signed a three-year co-operation contract with the foundation, working with Childhood on its cause-related issues. The Major Partners include Volvo Cars Sweden, Handelsbanken and ICA. The sister foundations in Brazil, Germany, and the United States work in similar ways with companies of different kinds to raise awareness and funds.

Childhood celebrated its 10th anniversary in 2009, and has, since its inception, distributed over US$60 million to more than 600 projects.
