= Björn Rosengren (businessman) =

Swedish manager (born 1959)

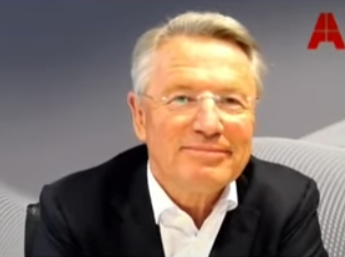
- Speaking at the 2021 World Economic Forum
- Born: April 4, 1959 (age 67)
- Education: Chalmers University of Technology
- Occupation: Businessman
- Title: CEO of ABB
- Board member of: World Childhood Foundation

Björn Rosengren (born 1959) is a Swedish business executive. He has been chief executive officer (CEO) of ABB since March 2020.

== Life ==
=== Education ===
Rosengren holds a master's degree in mechanical engineering from Chalmers University of Technology, Gothenburg, Sweden.

=== Career ===
From 1985 to 1995, he held various positions at ESAB in the US, the Netherlands, Switzerland and Sweden. In 1995 he became the general manager of NordHydraulik.

Rosengren was the business area manager for Atlas Copco's construction and mining equipment division and Senior Executive Vice President for nine years from 2003 to 2011 before he left the company 2011 to serve as CEO for Wärtsilä. He had been mentioned as a strong candidate for the CEO position at Atlas Copco in 2009. In 2015, he left Wärtsilä to become the CEO and president of Sandvik, where his decentralisation strategy proved profitable. Decentralisation was a core part of his strategy both at Wärtsilä and Sandvik. At Sandvik he was also a member of the board of directors from 2016 until 2020. Since March 2020 he is CEO of the Swedish-Swiss company ABB.

=== Memberships ===
Rosengren is a member of the International Business Council (IBC) of the World Economic Forum and of the European Round Table for Industry. He is also a member of the board of directors of the World Childhood Foundation.
