= Mattson Technology =

Semiconductor company

Mattson Technology Inc.
- Company type: Private (1988–1994, since 2016); partly state-owned
- Traded as: Nasdaq: MTSN
- Industry: Semiconductor equipment and materials
- Founded: 1988; 38 years ago
- Founders: Brad Mattson
- Headquarters: Fremont, California, United States
- Key people: Allen Lu (CEO and president)
- Products: Dry Strip, Rapid Thermal Processing, Etch
- Parent: Beijing E-Town
- Website: www.mattson.com

Mattson Technology Inc. is an American technology company which was founded in 1988 by Brad Mattson and is based in Fremont, California. The company is partly state-owned by the municipal government of Beijing. The company is both a manufacturer and supplier in the market of semiconductor equipment globally. Its main products are dry strip system, rapid thermal processing, as well as etching. The company provides products for customers and manufacturers such as foundries, memory and logic devices.

In December 2013, Mattson Technology announced its paradigmE XP, next-generation etch system, extending the company's etch technology and enabling chipmakers to address processing challenges for leading-edge, three-dimensional semiconductor manufacturing. This new system has been qualified in November by advanced DRAM device technologies.

In May 2016, Mattson Technology and Beijing E-Town ("E-Town Dragon") jointly announced that the previously announced acquisition of Mattson by E-Town had been completed. Allen Lu has served as the company's CEO and President since October 2016.

In 2022, Applied Materials sued Mattson Technology, alleging theft of trade secrets. In November 2023, Mattson Technology countersued Applied Materials.
