= Intersolar =

Intersolar is a trade fair in the solar energy industry.

The exhibition and conference series focuses on the areas of photovoltaics, PV production technology, energy storage and solar thermal energy. It launched in 1991. The trade fairs and conferences take place in Munich, San Francisco, Mumbai, Beijing and São Paulo.
