= 1998–99 Connacht Rugby season =

- Ground(s): The Sportsground, Galway
- Coach: Glen Ross
- Top scorer: Simon Allnutt (88)
- Most tries: Simon Allnutt (4); Russell Southam (4)
- League(s): Challenge Cup (5th of 7); IRFU Interprovincial Championship (4th)

The 1998–99 season was Connacht's fourth season under professionalism. New Zealander Glenn Ross was head coach, appointed to replace Warren Gatland, who had been appointed head coach of the Ireland national team. They competed in the Challenge Cup, finishing fifth in their pool, and the IRFU Interprovincial Championship, finishing fourth. They hosted Morocco, defeating them 30–5.

== Players selected ==
Connacht Rugby squad
**Props**: (Ireland) Martin Cahill (Buccaneers); (Ireland) Michael Finlay (Galwegians); (Ireland) John Maher (St Mary's); (Ireland) Jimmy Screene (Buccaneers); **Hookers**: (Ireland) Bernard Jackman (Clontarf); (Ireland) Billy Mulcahy (Skerries); (Ireland) Joe McVeigh (Buccaneers); **Locks**: (Ireland) Jimmy Duffy (Galwegians); (Ireland) Graham Heaslip (Galwegians); (Ireland) Justin Cullen (unattached)	**Back row**: (Ireland) John Casserly (Galwegians); (New Zealand) Junior Charlie (Galwegians); (Ireland) Neil Culliton (Buccaneers); (Ireland) Ronnie Culliton (Wanderers); (Ireland) Ian Dillon (Bohemians); (Ireland) Barry Gavin (Galwegians); (Ireland) Shane McEntee (Lansdowne); (New Zealand) Martyn Steffert (Buccaneers); **Scrum-halves**: (Ireland) **Conor McGuinness** (St Mary's); (Ireland) Diarmuid Reddan (Galwegians); (Ireland) David Mescal (Ballina); **Fly-halves**: (New Zealand) Simon Allnutt (Buccaneers); (Ireland) **Eric Elwood** (Galwegians)	**Centres**: (Ireland) Pat Duignan (Galwegians); (Ireland) Mervyn Murphy (Galwegians); **Wings**: (Ireland) Nigel Carolan (Galwegians); (Ireland) Alan Reddan (Galwegians); (Ireland) Russell Southam (Buccaneers); **Fullbacks**: (Ireland) Owen Cobbe (Wanderers); (Ireland) Willie Ruane (Galwegians)
(c) denotes the team captain, **Bold** denotes internationally capped players.^{*} denotes players qualified to play for Ireland on residency or dual nationality.

== IRFU Interprovincial Championship ==
Team	P	W	D	L	F	A	BP	Pts	Status
Munster	6	4	0	2	125	92	2	18	Champions; qualified for 1999–2000 Heineken Cup
Ulster	6	3	0	3	137	119	3	15	Qualified for 1999–2000 Heineken Cup
Leinster	6	3	0	3	135	136	2	14	Qualified for 1999–2000 Heineken Cup
Connacht	6	2	0	4	95	145	3	11	Qualified for 1999–2000 European Challenge Cup

15 August 1998	Connacht	13–18	Munster	Galway Sportsgrounds
	Try: Ruane; Con: Elwood; Pen: Elwood (2)	Report	Try: Lacey; Keane; Con: Keane; Pen: Keane (2)
Connacht lineup: 1. Jimmy Screene, 2. Billy Mulcahy, 3. Martin Cahill, 4. Justin Cullen, 5. Jimmy Duffy, 6. Junior Charlie, 7. Shane McEntee, 8. Barry Gavin, 9. Diarmuid Reddan, 10. Eric Elwood, 11. Nigel Carolan, 12. Alan Reddan, 13. Mervyn Murphy, 14. Nigel Carolan, 15. Willie Ruane.; Replacements: Bernard Jackman (for Mulcahy 46'), John Maher (for Screene 68').

22 August 1998	Connacht	21-18	Ulster	Galway Sportsgrounds
	Try: Duignan (2); Murphy; Con: Elwood (3)	Report	Try: Cunningham; Ward; Con: Mason; Pen: Mason (2)
Connacht lineup: 1. Jimmy Screene, 2. Billy Mulcahy, 3. Martin Cahill, 4. Justin Cullen, 5. Jimmy Duffy, 6. John Casserly, 7. Shane McEntee, 8. Barry Gavin, 9. Diarmuid Reddan, 10. Eric Elwood, 11. Alan Reddan, 12. Mervyn Murphy, 13. Pat Duignan, 14. Nigel Carolan, 15. Willie Ruane.; Replacement: Ian Dillon (for Casserly 40')

28 August 1998	Leinster	29-24	Connacht	Donnybrook Stadium
	Try: Dempsey; Costello; Con: McGowan (2); Pen: McGowan (5)	Report	Try: Gavin; Murphy; Duignan; Screene; Con: Allnutt (2)
Connacht lineup: 1. Jimmy Screene, 2. Billy Mulcahy, 3. Martin Cahill, 4. Justin Cullen, 5. Jimmy Duffy, 6. Shane McEntee, 7. Ian Dillon, 8. Barry Gavin, 9. Diarmuid Reddan, 10. Eric Elwood, 11. Alan Reddan, 12. Mervyn Murphy, 13. Pat Duignan, 14. Russell Southam, 15. Willie Ruane.; Replacements: Bernard Jackman (for Mulcahy 5'), Simon Allnutt (for Elwood 39'), John Maher (for Cahill 47'), Graham Heaslip (for Duffy 57'), David Mescal (for D. Reddan 62'), Nigel Carolan (for A. Reddan 79').

12 September 1998	Munster	21–7	Connacht	Dooradoyle
	Try: Quinlan; Lacey; Con: Keane; Pen: Keane (3)	Report	Try: Heaslip; Con: Allnutt
Connacht lineup: 1. John Maher, 2. Joe McVeigh, 3. Jimmy Screene, 4. Graham Heaslip, 5. Jimmy Duffy, 6. Ian Dillon, 7. Junior Charlie, 8. Shane MCEntee, 9. Conor McGuinness, 10. Simon Allnutt, 11. Nigel Carolan, 12. Mervyn Murphy, 13. Pat Duignan, 14. Alan Reddan, 15. Willie Ruane.; Replacements: Bernard Jackman (for McVeigh 42'), Neil Culliton (for McEntee 79'), Diarmuid Reddan (for McGuinness 11-21)

3 October 1998	Connacht	24-23	Leinster	Galway Sportsgrounds
	Try: Mulcahy; A. Reddan; Allnutt; Con: Allnut (3); Pen: Allnut	Report	Try: Nowlan; Dempsey; Con: McGowan (2); Pen: McGowan (2)
Connacht lineup: 1. Jimmy Screene, 2. Billy Mulcahy, 3. Martin Cahill, 4. Graham Heaslip, 5. Jimmy Duffy, 6. Junior Charlie, 7. Shane McEntee, 8. Barry Gavin, 9. Conor McGuinness, 10. Simon Allnutt, 11. Alan Reddan, 12. Mervyn Murphy, 13. Pat Duignan, 14. Russell Southam, 15. Willie Ruane.; Replacements: Michael Finlay (for Screene 5-8', 10-14'), Ian Dillon (for McEntee 43'), Nigel Carolan (for Southam 50')

23 October 1998	Ulster	36-6	Connacht	Ravenhill
	Try: Ward; McKinty; Topping; Clarke; Mason; Con: Mason (4); Pen: Mason	Report	Pen: Allnutt (2)	Referee: David McHugh
Connacht lineup: 1. Jimmy Screene, 2. Billy Mulcahy, 3. Martin Cahill, 4. Graham Heaslip, 5. Jimmy Duffy, 6. Junior Charlie, 7. Ian Dillon, 8. Barry Gavin, 9. Conor McGuinness, 10. Simon Allnutt, 11. Alan Reddan, 12. Mervyn Murphy, 13. Pat Duignan, 14. Nigel Carolan, 15. Willie Ruane.; Replacements: John Maher (for Cahill 45'), John Casserly (for Charlie 67'), Neil Culliton (for Dillon 77').				Referee: David McHugh

== European Challenge Cup ==
=== Pool 1 ===
Team	P	W	D	L	Tries for	Tries against	Try diff	Points for	Points against	Points diff	Pts
(France) Narbonne	6	6	0	0	32	13	+19	228	98	+130	12
(Wales) Caerphilly	6	4	0	2	16	19	−3	167	154	+13	8
(France) Périgueux	6	3	0	3	23	13	+10	168	119	+49	6
Racing Club de France	6	3	0	3	17	23	−6	127	184	−57	6
(Ireland) Connacht	6	3	0	3	16	19	−3	129	156	−27	6
(Wales) Newport	6	1	0	5	14	23	−9	123	183	−60	2
(Italy) Rugby Rovigo	6	1	0	5	12	20	−8	108	156	−48	2

26 September 1998	Newport (Wales)	12–31	(Ireland) Connacht	Rodney Parade
14:30	Pen: Connor (4)	Report	Try: Dillon; Mulcahy; Allnutt; Heaslip; Southam; Con: Allnutt (3)	Attendance: 655
Connacht lineup: 1. Jimmy Screene, 2. Billy Mulcahy, 3. Michael Finlay, 4. Graham Heaslip, 5. Jimmy Duffy, 6. Junior Charlie, 7. Ian Dillon, 8. Barry Gavin, 9. Conor McGuinness, 10. Simon Allnutt, 11. Alan Reddan, 12. Mervyn Murphy, 13. Pat Duignan, 14. Russell Southam, 15. Willie Ruane.; Replacements: Owen Cobbe, Joe McVeigh, Martin Cahill.				Attendance: 655

7 October 1998	Connacht (Ireland)	29–28	(France) Périgueux	The Sports Ground
14:30	Try: Duffy; Carolan; Ruane; Con: Allnutt; Pen: Allnutt (4)	Report	Try: Cheyrou; Blondy; Nelson; Miquel; Con: Doussy (3); Miquel	Attendance: 1,000
Connacht lineup: 1. Jimmy Screene, 2. Billy Mulcahy, 3. Martin Cahill, 4. Graham Heaslip, 5. Jimmy Duffy, 6. Junior Charlie, 7. Ian Dillon, 8. Barry Gavin, 9. Conor McGuinness, 10. Simon Allnutt, 11. Nigel Carolan, 12. Mervyn Murphy, 13. Pat Duignan, 14. Alan Reddan, 15. Willie Ruane.; Replacements: Shane McEntee, Joe McVeigh, John Maher.				Attendance: 1,000

11 October 1998	Rugby Rovigo (Italy)	20–21	(Ireland) Connacht	Stadio Mario Battaglini
15:30	Try: Golfetti; Gross; Con: Scanavacca (2); Pen: Scanavacca (2)	Report	Try: Allnutt (2); Con: Allnutt; Pen: Allnutt (3)	Attendance: 1,200
Connacht lineup: 1. Jimmy Screene, 2. Billy Mulcahy, 3. Martin Cahill, 4. Graham Heaslip, 5. Jimmy Duffy, 6. Junior Charlie, 7. Shane McEntee, 8. Barry Gavin, 9. Conor McGuinness, 10. Simon Allnutt, 11. Nigel Carolan, 12. Mervyn Murphy, 13. Pat Duignan, 14. Alan Reddan, 15. Willie Ruane.; Replacements: Joe McVeigh, John Maher.				Attendance: 1,200

17 October 1998	Connacht (Ireland)	26–38	(France) Narbonne	The Sports Ground
14:30	Try: McEntee; Maher; Screene; Con: Cobbe; Pen: Allnutt (2); Cobbe	Report	Try: Schisano; Plataret; Calvel; Raynaud; Tanir; Stoica; Con: Valls (4)	Attendance: 2,500
Connacht lineup: 1. Jimmy Screene, 2. Billy Mulcahy, 3. Martin Cahill, 4. Graham Heaslip, 5. Jimmy Duffy, 6. Junior Charlie, 7. Shane McEntee, 8. Barry Gavin, 9. Conor McGuinness, 10. Simon Allnutt, 11. Alan Reddan, 12. Mervyn Murphy, 13. Pat Duignan, 14. Russell Southam, 15. Willie Ruane.; Replacements: Owen Cobbe, John Maher.				Attendance: 2,500

31 October 1998	Caerphilly (Wales)	39–8	(Ireland) Connacht	Virginia Park
14:30	Try: Marshall; Bidgood; Davey; John; Con: Davey (4); Pen: Davey (2)	Report	Try: Carolan; Pen: Elwood	Attendance: 600
Connacht lineup: 1. John Maher, 2. Billy Mulcahy, 3. Jimmy Screene, 4. Graham Heaslip, 5. Jimmy Duffy, 6. Junior Charlie, 7. Shane McEntee, 8. Barry Gavin, 9. Conor McGuinness, 10. Eric Elwood, 11. Nigel Carolan, 12. Mervyn Murphy, 13. Pat Duignan, 14. Alan Reddan, 15. Willie Ruane.; Replacements: John Casserly, Joe McVeigh, Ian Dillon, Martin Cahill.				Attendance: 600

7 November 1998	Connacht (Ireland)	14–19	Racing Club de France	The Sports Ground
14:30	Try: A. Reddan; Screene; Con: Elwood (2)	Report	Try: Chevallier; Goirand; Terryn; Con: Bentayou (2)	Attendance: 500
Connacht lineup: 1. John Maher, 2. Billy Mulcahy, 3. Jimmy Screene, 4. Graham Heaslip, 5. Jimmy Duffy, 6. John Casserly, 7. Shane McEntee, 8. Martyn Steffert, 9. Conor McGuinness, 10. Eric Elwood, 11. Nigel Carolan, 12. Mervyn Murphy, 13. Pat Duignan, 14. Alan Reddan, 15. Willie Ruane.; Replacements: Bernard Jackman, Martin Cahill, Ronnie Culliton.				Attendance: 500

== Representative ==
7 August 1998	Connacht (Ireland)	30-5	Morocco	The Sportsground, Galway
18:30	Try: Southam (3); Mescal; Con: Cobbe (2); Pen: Cobbe (2)	Report	Try: El Oula
Connacht lineup: 1. Jimmy Screene, 2. Bernard Jackman, 3. Martin Cahill, 4. Jimmy Duffy, 5. Graham Heaslip, 6. Junior Charlie, 7. Barry Gavin, 8. Shane McEntee, 9. Diarmuid Reddan, 10. Owen Cobbe, 11. Alan Reddan, 12. Mervyn Murphy (c), 13. Pat Duignan, 14. Nigel Carolan, 15. Russell Southam.; Replacements: Billy Mulcahy (for Jackman 44'), John Maher (for Cahill 47'), David Mescal (for D. Reddan 49'), Willie Ruane (for Carolan 63'), John Casserly (for Duffy 65'), Allnutt (for Cobbe 52-58').

== Friendly ==
4 September 1998	Gasgow Caledonians (Scotland)	28-13	(Ireland) Connacht	Stirling
	Try: Craig; Stark; Simpson; Con: Hayes (2); Pen: Hayes (3)	Report	Try: Carolan; Con: Cobbe; Pen: Cobbe (2)
Connacht lineup: 1. John Maher, 2. Joe McVeigh, 3. Michael Finlay, 4. Graham Heaslip, 5. Jimmy Duffy, 6. John Casserly, 7. Shane McEntee, 8. Ian Dillon, 9. Conor McGuinness, 10. Owen Cobbe, 11. Nigel Carolan, 12. Mervyn Murphy, 13. Pat Duignan, 14. Russell Southam, 15. Willie Ruane.; Replacements: Diarmuid Reddan (for McGuinness 34'), Simon Allnutt (for Cobbe 40'), Neil Culliton (for McEntee 48'), Alan Reddan (for Southam 54'), Jimmy Screene (for Finlay 60')
