= 1997–98 Connacht Rugby season =

- Ground(s): The Sportsground, Galway
- Coach: Warren Gatland
- Top scorer: Eric Elwood (112)
- Most tries: Nigel Carolan (3)
- League(s): Challenge Cup (quarter-finals); IRFU Interprovincial Championship (4th of 4)

The 1997-98 season was Connacht's third season under professionalism. Warren Gatland was in his second season as head coach. They competed in the European Challenge Cup, making the quarter-finals, and the IRFU Interprovincial Championship, finishing fourth.

The win in Northampton and victory over Bordeaux-Bègles in Stade André Moga made Connacht the first professional Irish team to beat an English team in England and a French team in France respectively.

The IRFU offered new contracts for provincial players for this season. Full-time players would receive a retainer of £25,000, plus a win bonus of £500 for Heineken Cup matches. Part-time players would be paid a retainer of £7,500, plus a match fee of £400 for Interprovincial matches and £800 for the Heineken Cup, and a win bonus of £450 for both competitions. Each province could have a maximum of 30 contracted players.

== Players selected ==
Connacht Rugby squad
**Props**: (Ireland) Martin Cahill (Bohemians); (Ireland) Michael Finlay (Galwegians); (Ireland) John Maher (Bective Rangers); (Ireland) Ray Ward (Old Belevedere); **Hookers**: (Ireland) Bernard Jackman (Clontarf); (Ireland) Billy Mulcahy (Skerries); **Locks**: (Ireland) Graham Heaslip (Galwegians) (c); (Ireland) Mark McConnell (Buccaneers)	**Back row**: (New Zealand) Junior Charlie (Galwegians); (Ireland) Barry Gavin (Galwegians); (Ireland) Shane McEntee (Wanderers); (Ireland) Mick O'Neill (Blackrock); (Ireland) Mark Reilly (St Mary's); (Ireland) Rory Rogers (Blackrock); **Scrum-halves**: (Ireland) Conor McGuinness (St Mary's); **Fly-halves**: (Ireland) **Eric Elwood** (Galwegians)	**Centres**: (New Zealand) Simon Allnutt (Corinthians); (Ireland) Pat Duignan (Galwegians); (Ireland) Mervyn Murphy (Galwegians); (Ireland) Alan Reddan (Lansdowne); **Wings**: (Ireland) **Nicky Barry** (Clontarf); (Ireland) Nigel Carolan (Galwegians); **Fullbacks**: (Ireland) Willie Ruane (Ballina); (Ireland) Russell Southam (Suttonians)
(c) denotes the team captain, **Bold** denotes internationally capped players.^{*} denotes players qualified to play for Ireland on residency or dual nationality.

== IRFU Interprovincial Championship ==
Team	P	W	D	L	F	A	BP	Pts	Status
Leinster	3	2	0	1	61	46	-	4	Champions; qualified for 1998–99 Heineken Cup
Munster	3	2	0	1	56	43	-	4	Qualified for 1998–99 Heineken Cup
Ulster	3	1	0	2	59	65	-	2	Qualified for 1998–99 Heineken Cup
Connacht	3	1	0	2	42	64	-	2	Qualified for 1998–99 European Challenge Cup

16 August 1997	Connacht	9–29	Munster	Galway Sportsgrounds
	Pen: Elwood (3)	Report	Try: Halvey; O'Gara; Galwey; Con: O'Gara; Pen: O'Gara; Drop: O'Gara
Connacht lineup: 1. John Maher, 2. Billy Mulcahy, 3. Martin Cahill, 4. Graham Heaslip, 5. Mark McConnell, 6. Rory Rogers, 7. Barry Gavin, 8. Junior Charlie, 9. Conor McGuinness, 10. Eric Elwood, 11. Nigel Carolan, 12. S. Allnutt, 13. Pat Duignan, 14. Nicky Barry, 15. Willie Ruane.; Replacements: Bernard Jackman (for Mulcahy), Mick O'Neill (for Rogers), R, Ward (for Cahel).

23 August 1997	Connacht	27-17	Ulster	Galway Sportsgrounds
	Try: McEntee; Murphy; Charlie; Con: Elwood (3); Pen: Elwood (2)	Report	Try: McDowell (2); Con: Laing (2); Pen: Laing	Referee: L. Mayne
Connacht lineup: 1. John Maher, 2. Billy Mulcahy, 3. Michael Finlay, 4. Graham Heaslip, 5. Mark McConnell, 6. Shane McEntee, 7. Junior Charlie, 8. Barry Gavin, 9. Conor McGuinness, 10. Eric Elwood, 11. Nigel Carolan, 12. Pat Duignan, 13. S. Allnutt, 14. Nicky Barry, 15. Willie Ruane.; Replacement: Mervyn Murphy (for Allnutt).				Referee: L. Mayne

30 August 1997	Leinster	23-6	Connacht	Donnybrook Stadium
	Try: Ridge; Con: McGowan; Pen: McGowan (3)	Report	Pen: Elwood (2)	Referee: D. McHugh
Connacht lineup: 1. John Maher, 2. Billy Mulcahy, 3. Michael Finlay, 4. Graham Heaslip, 5. Mark McConnell, 6. Rory Rogers, 7. Shane McEntee, 8. Barry Gavin, 9. Conor McGuinness, 10. Eric Elwood, 11. Nigel Carolan, 12. Pat Duignan, 13. S. Allnutt, 14. Nicky Barry, 15. Willie Ruane.; Replacements: Russell Southam (for Ruane 53'), Bernard Jackman (for Mulcahy 68'), R. Ward (for Maher 79').				Referee: D. McHugh

== European Challenge Cup ==
=== Pool 4 ===
Team	P	W	D	L	Tries for	Tries against	Try diff	Points for	Points against	Points diff	Pts
(Ireland) Connacht	6	5	0	1	11	13	−2	144	97	+47	10
(England) Northampton Saints	6	3	0	3	17	13	+4	161	116	+45	6
(France) Bordeaux-Begles	6	3	0	3	10	6	+4	112	110	+2	6
(France) Nice	6	1	0	5	14	20	−6	94	188	−94	2

9 September 1997	Connacht (Ireland)	43 – 13	Northampton Saints	The Sports Ground
15:00	Try: Duignan; McEntee; Ruane; Carolan; Con: Elwood (3); Allnutt; Pen: Elwood (4); Murphy	Report	Try: Beal; Con: Hepher; Pen: Hepher (2)
Connacht lineup: 1. John Maher, 2. Billy Mulcahy, 3. Michael Finlay, 4. Mark McConnell, 5. Graham Heaslip, 6. Rory Rogers (c), 7. Shane McEntee, 8. Barry Gavin, 9. Conor McGuinness, 10. Eric Elwood, 11. Nigel Carolan, 12. Mervyn Murphy, 13. Pat Duignan, 14. Nicky Barry, 15. Willie Ruane.; Replacements: Russell Southam, Simon Allnutt, Martin Cahill, Mark Reilly.

14 September 1997	Nice (France)	20 – 16	(Ireland) Connacht	Stade du Ray
15:00	Try: Dasalmartini; Martin; Penalty try Con: Fausto; Pen: Fausto	Report	Try: Duignan; Con: Elwood; Pen: Elwood (3)
Connacht lineup: 1. John Maher, 2. Billy Mulcahy, 3. Michael Finlay, 4. Graham Heaslip, 5. Mark McConnell, 6. Mark Reilly, 7. Shane McEntee, 8. Barry Gavin, 9. Conor McGuinness, 10. Eric Elwood, 11. Nigel Carolan, 12. Mervyn Murphy, 13. Pat Duignan, 14. Nicky Barry, 15. Willie Ruane.; Replacements: Ray Ward, Martin Cahill, Mick O'Neill.

20 September 1997	Bordeaux-Begles (France)	9 – 15	(Ireland) Connacht	Stade Andre Moga
20:00	Pen: Etchelo (3)	Report	Pen: Elwood (5)
Connacht lineup: 1. John Maher, 2. Billy Mulcahy, 3. Michael Finlay, 4. Graham Heaslip, 5. Mark McConnell, 6. Junior Charlie, 7. Shane McEntee, 8. Barry Gavin, 9. Conor McGuinness, 10. Eric Elwood, 11. Nigel Carolan, 12. Mervyn Murphy, 13. Pat Duignan, 14. Nicky Barry, 15. Willie Ruane.; Replacements: Ray Ward (for Maher 48'), Martin Cahill (for Finlay 60'), Alan Reddan (for Murphy 72')

27 September 1997	Connacht (Ireland)	28 – 25	(France) Nice	The Sports Ground
15:00	Try: Heaslip; Murphy; Pen: Elwood (6)	Report	Try: Gioletti (2); Bekkal; Berdeu; Con: Deauze; Drop: Deauze
Connacht lineup: 1. John Maher, 2. Billy Mulcahy, 3. Michael Finlay, 4. Graham Heaslip, 5. Mark McConnell, 6. Junior Charlie, 7. Shane McEntee, 8. Barry Gavin, 9. Conor McGuinness, 10. Eric Elwood, 11. Nigel Carolan, 12. Mervyn Murphy, 13. Pat Duignan, 14. Nicky Barry, 15. Willie Ruane.

4 October 1997	Connacht (Ireland)	22 – 15	(France) Bordeaux-Begles	The Sports Ground
15:00	Try: Carolan; Con: Elwood; Pen: Elwood (5)	Report	Try: Lemeur; Ossard; Con: Berthe; Pen: Berthe
Connacht lineup: 1. John Maher, 2. Billy Mulcahy, 3. Michael Finlay, 4. Graham Heaslip, 5. Mark McConnell, 6. Junior Charlie, 7. Shane McEntee, 8. Barry Gavin, 9. Conor McGuinness, 10. Eric Elwood, 11. Nigel Carolan, 12. Mervyn Murphy, 13. Pat Duignan, 14. Nicky Barry, 15. Willie Ruane.; Replacements: Martin Cahill.

11 October 1997	Northampton Saints (England)	15 – 20	(Ireland) Connacht	Franklin's Gardens
15:00	Try: Townsend; Bell; Con: Townsend; Pen: Townsend	Report	Try: Maher; Charlie; Carolan; Con: Elwood; Pen: Elwood
Connacht lineup: 1. John Maher, 2. Billy Mulcahy, 3. Michael Finlay, 4. Graham Heaslip, 5. Mark McConnell, 6. Junior Charlie, 7. Barry Gavin, 8. Shane McEntee, 9. Conor McGuinness, 10. Eric Elwood, 11. Nigel Carolan, 12. Mervyn Murphy, 13. Pat Duignan, 14. Nicky Barry, 15. Willie Ruane.; Replacements: Mark Reilly, Bernard Jackman.

=== Quarter-final ===
8 November 1997	Agen (France)	40–27	(Ireland) Connacht	Stade Armandie
20:00	Try: Dal Maso; Loubere(2); Benazzi (2); Con: Bouic (3); Pen: Bouic (3)	Report	Try: Maher; Southam; McGuinness; Con: Elwood (3); Pen: Elwood (2)
Connacht lineup: 1. John Maher, 2. Billy Mulcahy, 3. Michael Finlay, 4. Graham Heaslip, 5. Mark McConnell, 6. Shane McEntee, 7. Junior Charlie, 8. Barry Gavin, 9. Conor McGuinness, 10. Eric Elwood, 11. Nigel Carolan, 12. Mervyn Murphy, 13. Pat Duignan, 14. Nicky Barry, 15. Willie Ruane.; Replacements: Russell Southam, Bernard Jackman, Martin Cahill, Rory Rogers.
