= Gatland =

Gatland is a surname. Notable people with the surname include:

- Bryn Gatland (born 1995), New Zealand rugby union player, son of Warren
- Maria Gatland (born 1948), former Conservative councillor in London, former IRA member
- Warren Gatland (born 1963), New Zealand rugby union coach
