= 1998 European Challenge Cup final =

1998 European Challenge Cup Final
- Event: 1997–98 European Challenge Cup
Colomiers	SU Agen
(France)	(France)
43	5
- Date: 2 February 1998
- Venue: Les Sept Deniers, Toulouse
- Referee: Ed Morrison (England)
- Attendance: 12,500

The 1998 European Challenge Cup Final was the final match of the 1997–98 European Challenge Cup, the second season of Europe's second-tier club rugby union competition. The match was played on 2 February 1998 at Les Sept Deniers in Toulouse.

The match was contested by Colomiers and SU Agen, who are both from France. Colomiers won the match 43–5; scoring 7 tries including a double from flanker Bernard de Giusti. They did concede 1 try, scored by second rower Christophe Porcu.

== Match details ==
2 February 1998

Colomiers (France)	43 – 5	(France) SU Agen
Try: Biboulet; Roque; Sieurac; Galthié; De Giusti (2); Bru; Con: Carre (4)	Report	Try: Porcu

Les Sept Deniers
Attendance: 12,500
Referee: Ed Morrison (England)

== See also ==
- 1997–98 European Challenge Cup
