= 1997–98 European Challenge Cup pool stage =

- Season: 1997–98 European Challenge Cup
- Date: 7 September 1997 - 12 October 1997

Qualifiers
- Seed 1: (France) Colomiers
- Seed 2: (France) Agen
- Seed 3: (France) Stade Français
- Seed 4: (England) Newcastle Falcons
- Seed 5: (France) Montferrand
- Seed 6: (France) Castres Olympique
- Seed 7: (England) Gloucester
- Seed 8: (Ireland) Connacht

The pool stage of the 1997–98 European Challenge Cup.

== Pool 1 ==
Team	P	W	D	L	Tries for	Tries against	Try diff	Points for	Points against	Points diff	Pts
(France) Agen	6	6	0	0	27	12	+15	219	105	+114	12
(England) Bristol	6	2	0	4	16	22	−6	115	180	−65	4
(Wales) Ebbw Vale	6	2	0	4	12	17	−5	117	155	−38	4
(France) La Rochelle	6	2	0	4	11	15	−4	128	139	−11	4

7 September 1997
15:00

Bristol Shoguns (England)	33 – 14	(France) La Rochelle

Memorial Ground

7 September 1997
18:00

Ebbw Vale (Wales)	16 – 27	(France) Agen

Eugene Cross Park

13 September 1997
14:30

Ebbw Vale (Wales)	28 – 15	(England) Bristol Shoguns

Eugene Cross Park

14 September 1997
17:00

La Rochelle (France)	20 – 33	(France) Agen

Stade Marcel Deflandre

20 September 1997
14:15

Agen (France)	45 – 18	(England) Bristol Shoguns

Stade Armandie

20 September 1997
17:00

La Rochelle (France)	25 – 24	(Wales) Ebbw Vale

Stade Marcel Deflandre

27 September 1997
14:00

Agen (France)	21 – 15	(France) La Rochelle

Stade Armandie

27 September 1997
14:00

Bristol Shoguns (England)	18 – 16	(Wales) Ebbw Vale

Memorial Ground

3 October 1997
19:30

Bristol Shoguns (England)	24 – 42	(France) Agen

Memorial Ground

4 October 1997
14:00

Ebbw Vale (Wales)	21 – 19	(France) La Rochelle

Eugene Cross Park

11 October 1997
20:00

Agen (France)	51 – 12	(Wales) Ebbw Vale

Stade Armandie

12 October 1997
15:00

La Rochelle (France)	35 – 7	(England) Bristol Shoguns

Stade Marcel Deflandre

== Pool 2 ==
Team	P	W	D	L	Tries for	Tries against	Try diff	Points for	Points against	Points diff	Pts
(France) Montferrand	6	5	0	1	28	11	+17	203	120	+83	10
(Wales) Newport	6	3	0	3	20	27	−7	172	192	−20	6
(England) Sale Sharks	6	3	0	3	18	13	5	163	117	+46	6
(France) Montpellier	6	1	0	5	12	27	−15	90	199	−109	2

7 September 1997
14:00

Newport (Wales)	42 – 17	(France) Montpellier

Rodney Parade

7 September 1997
15:00

Montferrand (France)	25 – 16	(England) Sale Sharks

Stade Marcel Michelin

13 September 1997
14:05

Montferrand (France)	58 – 32	(Wales) Newport

Stade Marcel Michelin

14 September 1997
15:00

Montpellier (France)	30 – 12	(England) Sale Sharks

Stade Sabathe

21 September 1997
15:00

Montpellier (France)	16 – 18	(France) Montferrand

Stade Sabathe

21 September 1997
15:00

Sale Sharks (England)	61 – 27	(Wales) Newport

Heywood Road

27 September 1997
14:00

Newport (Wales)	26 – 31	(France) Montferrand

Rodney Parade

28 September 1997
15:00

Sale Sharks (England)	43 – 3	(France) Montpellier

Heywood Road

4 October 1997
14:00

Newport (Wales)	17 – 11	(England) Sale Sharks

Rodney Parade

4 October 1997
19:00

Montferrand (France)	56 – 10	(France) Montpellier

Stade Marcel Michelin

12 October 1997
15:00

Montpellier (France)	14 – 28	(Wales) Newport

Stade Sabathe

12 October 1997
15:00

Sale Sharks (England)	20 – 15	(France) Montferrand

Heywood Road

== Pool 3 ==
Team	P	W	D	L	Tries for	Tries against	Try diff	Points for	Points against	Points diff	Pts
(France) Stade Français	6	5	0	1	48	18	+30	337	131	+206	10
(England) London Irish	6	4	0	2	18	14	4	169	133	+36	8
(France) Dax	6	3	0	3	14	20	−6	139	180	−41	6
(Romania) Farul Constanţa	6	0	0	6	10	38	−28	94	295	−201	0

6 September 1997
20:00

Dax (France)	32 – 20	(Romania) Farul Constanţa

Stade Maurice Boyau

7 September 1997
14:30

London Irish (England)	25 – 41	(France) Stade Français

The Avenue

12 September 1997
20:00

Dax (France)	34 – 19	(England) London Irish

Stade Maurice Boyau

13 September 1997
17:00

Stade Français (France)	83 – 10	(Romania) Farul Constanţa

Stade Jean Bouin

20 September 1997
16:00

Stade Français (France)	65 – 19	(France) Dax

Stade Jean Bouin

20 September 1997
16:30

Farul Constanţa (Romania)	9 – 26	(England) London Irish

Stadionul de Rugby Farul

27 September 1997
15:00

London Irish (England)	24 – 11	(France) Dax

The Avenue

27 September 1997
16:30

Farul Constanţa (Romania)	28 – 85	(France) Stade Français

Stadionul de Rugby Farul

4 October 1997
15:00

London Irish (England)	46 – 10	(Romania) Farul Constanţa

The Avenue

4 October 1997
20:00

Dax (France)	20 – 35	(France) Stade Français

Stade Maurice Boyau

11 October 1997
15:00

Stade Français (France)	28 – 29	(England) London Irish

Stade Jean Bouin

11 October 1997
16:30

Farul Constanţa (Romania)	17 – 23	(France) Dax

Stadionul de Rugby Farul

== Pool 4 ==
Team	P	W	D	L	Tries for	Tries against	Try diff	Points for	Points against	Points diff	Pts
(Ireland) Connacht	6	5	0	1	11	13	−2	144	97	+47	10
(England) Northampton Saints	6	3	0	3	17	13	+4	161	116	+45	6
(France) Bordeaux-Begles	6	3	0	3	10	6	+4	112	110	+2	6
(France) Nice	6	1	0	5	14	20	−6	94	188	−94	2

6 September 1997
20:00

Nice (France)	24 – 25	(France) Bordeaux-Begles

Stade du Ray

9 September 1997
15:00

Connacht (Ireland)	43 – 13	Northampton Saints

The Sports Ground

13 September 1997
15:00

Northampton Saints (England)	25 – 13	(France) Bordeaux-Begles

Franklin's Gardens

14 September 1997
15:00

Nice (France)	20 – 16	(Ireland) Connacht

Stade du Ray

20 September 1997
17:00

Northampton Saints (England)	66 – 7	(France) Nice

Franklin's Gardens

20 September 1997
20:00

Bordeaux-Begles (France)	9 – 15	(Ireland) Connacht

Stade Andre Moga

27 September 1997
15:00

Connacht (Ireland)	28 – 25	(France) Nice

The Sports Ground

27 September 1997
20:00

Bordeaux-Begles (France)	23 – 16	(England) Northampton Saints

Stade Andre Moga

4 October 1997
15:00

Connacht (Ireland)	22 – 15	(France) Bordeaux-Begles

The Sports Ground

4 October 1997
20:00

Nice (France)	10 – 26	(England) Northampton Saints

Stade du Ray

11 October 1997
15:00

Northampton Saints (England)	15 – 20	(Ireland) Connacht

Franklin's Gardens

11 October 1997
20:00

Bordeaux-Begles (France)	27 – 8	(France) Nice

Stade Andre Moga

== Pool 5 ==
Team	P	W	D	L	Tries for	Tries against	Try diff	Points for	Points against	Points diff	Pts
(France) Colomiers	6	6	0	0	40	13	+27	290	121	+169	12
(England) Richmond	6	4	0	2	28	15	+13	196	133	+63	8
(Wales) Bridgend RFC	6	2	0	4	12	37	−25	130	259	−129	4
(France) Grenoble	6	0	0	6	9	24	−15	112	215	−103	0

7 September 1997
14:30

Grenoble (France)	33 – 35	(Wales) Bridgend

Stade Lesdiguieres

7 September 1997
15:00

Colomiers (France)	34 – 18	(England) Richmond

Stade Selery

13 September 1997
15:00

Richmond (England)	43 – 14	(Wales) Bridgend

The Athletic Ground

14 September 1997
15:00

Colomiers (France)	60 – 10	(France) Grenoble

Stade Selery

20 September 1997
14:00

Bridgend (Wales)	24 – 49	(France) Colomiers

Brewery Field

20 September 1997
15:00

Richmond (England)	37 – 8	(France) Grenoble

The Athletic Ground

27 September 1997
18:00

Bridgend (Wales)	12 – 44	(England) Richmond

Brewery Field

27 September 1997
20:00

Grenoble (France)	24 – 29	(France) Colomiers

Stade Lesdiguieres

4 October 1997
16:00

Colomiers (France)	69 – 20	(Wales) Bridgend

Stade Selery

4 October 1997
20:00

Grenoble (France)	16 – 29	(England) Richmond

Stade Lesdiguieres

11 October 1997
14:30

Bridgend (Wales)	25 – 21	(France) Grenoble

Brewery Field

12 October 1997
14:15

Richmond (England)	25 – 49	(France) Colomiers

The Athletic Ground

== Pool 6 ==
Team	P	W	D	L	Tries for	Tries against	Try diff	Points for	Points against	Points diff	Pts
(England) Gloucester	6	5	0	1	19	12	+7	170	101	+69	10
(France) Toulon	6	3	1	2	12	7	+5	136	104	+32	7
(France) Béziers	6	2	1	3	18	14	+4	150	147	+3	5
(Italy) Petrarca Rugby	6	0	2	4	13	29	−16	108	212	−104	2

6 September 1997
20:00

Toulon (France)	19 – 14	(France) Béziers

Stade Félix Mayol

7 September 1997
15:00

Gloucester (England)	43 – 10	(Italy) Petrarca Rugby

Kingsholm

13 September 1997
15:00

Gloucester (England)	18 – 15	(France) Toulon

Kingsholm

13 September 1997
20:30

Béziers (France)	40 – 23	(Italy) Petrarca Rugby

Stade de la Méditerranée

20 September 1997
14:15

Béziers (France)	27 – 29	(England) Gloucester

Stade de la Méditerranée

21 September 1997
15:30

Petrarca Rugby (Italy)	13 – 54	(France) Toulon

Stadio Plebiscito

27 September 1997
20:30

Petrarca Rugby (Italy)	26 – 26	(France) Béziers

Stadio Plebiscito

28 September 1997
19:00

Toulon (France)	16 – 13	(England) Gloucester

Stade Félix Mayol

4 October 1997
15:00

Gloucester (England)	38 – 17	(France) Béziers

Kingsholm

4 October 1997
20:00

Toulon (France)	20 – 20	(Italy) Petrarca Rugby

Stade Félix Mayol

11 October 1997
20:30

Béziers (France)	26 – 12	(France) Toulon

Stade de la Méditerranée

12 October 1997
15:30

Petrarca Rugby (Italy)	16 – 29	(England) Gloucester

Stadio Plebiscito

== Pool 7 ==
Team	P	W	D	L	Tries for	Tries against	Try diff	Points for	Points against	Points diff	Pts
(England) Newcastle Falcons	6	5	0	1	36	8	+28	264	98	+166	10
(France) Biarritz	6	3	0	3	10	17	−7	123	153	−30	6
(France) Perpignan	6	2	0	4	12	13	−1	98	138	−40	4
(Scotland) Edinburgh	6	2	0	4	9	29	−20	109	205	−96	4

7 September 1997
16:00

Newcastle Falcons (England)	37 – 10	(France) Biarritz

Kingston Park Stadium

7 September 1997
19:00

Perpignan (France)	21 – 9	(Scotland) Edinburgh

Stade Aimé Giral

14 September 1997
15:00

Edinburgh (Scotland)	15 – 32	(France) Biarritz

Goldenacre

14 September 1997
15:00

Newcastle Falcons (England)	60 – 3	(France) Perpignan

Kingston Park Stadium

20 September 1997
20:00

Biarritz (France)	18 – 6	(France) Perpignan

Parc des Sports Aguilera

21 September 1997
15:00

Edinburgh (Scotland)	16 – 40	(England) Newcastle Falcons

Goldenacre

27 September 1997
20:00

Biarritz (France)	25 – 27	(Scotland) Edinburgh

Parc des Sports Aguilera

27 September 1997
20:30

Perpignan (France)	13 – 27	(England) Newcastle Falcons

Stade Aimé Giral

4 October 1997
20:30

Perpignan (France)	40 – 6	(France) Biarritz

Stade Aimé Giral

5 October 1997
15:00

Newcastle Falcons (England)	72 – 24	(Scotland) Edinburgh

Kingston Park Stadium

11 October 1997
14:15

Biarritz (France)	32 – 28	(England) Newcastle Falcons

Parc des Sports Aguilera

12 October 1997
15:00

Edinburgh (Scotland)	18 – 15	(France) Perpignan

Goldenacre

== Pool 8 ==
Team	P	W	D	L	Tries for	Tries against	Try diff	Points for	Points against	Points diff	Pts
(France) Castres	6	5	0	1	26	10	+16	206	97	+109	10
(England) Saracens	6	5	0	1	23	13	10	197	128	+69	10
(France) Narbonne	6	2	0	4	19	14	+5	168	138	+30	4
(Wales) Neath	6	0	0	6	10	41	−31	93	301	−208	0

7 September 1997
15:00

Neath (Wales)	12 – 36	(France) Castres

The Gnoll

7 September 1997
18:00

Narbonne (France)	16 – 18	(England) Saracens

Parc des Sports et de l'Amitié

13 September 1997
18:00

Neath (Wales)	10 – 50	(France) Narbonne

The Gnoll

14 September 1997
15:00

Saracens (England)	26 – 21	(France) Castres

Vicarage Road

20 September 1997
20:00

Castres (France)	24 – 19	(France) Narbonne

Stade Pierre Antoine

21 September 1997
15:00

Saracens (England)	69 – 30	(Wales) Neath

Vicarage Road

27 September 1997
14:15

Castres (France)	32 – 18	(England) Saracens

Stade Pierre Antoine

27 September 1997
19:30

Narbonne (France)	52 – 21	(Wales) Neath

Parc des Sports et de l'Amitié

4 October 1997
18:00

Neath (Wales)	12 – 26	(England) Saracens

The Gnoll

4 October 1997
19:30

Narbonne (France)	14 – 25	(France) Castres

Parc des Sports et de l'Amitié

11 October 1997
20:00

Castres (France)	68 – 8	(Wales) Neath

Stade Pierre Antoine

12 October 1997
15:00

Saracens (England)	40 – 17	(France) Narbonne

Vicarage Road

== Qualifiers ==
Seed	Pool Winners	Pts	TF	+/−
1	(France) Colomiers	12	40	+169
2	(France) Agen	12	27	+114
3	(France) Stade Français	10	48	+206
4	(England) Newcastle Falcons	10	36	+166
5	(France) Montferrand	10	28	+83
6	(France) Castres Olympique	10	26	+109
7	(England) Gloucester	10	19	+69
8	(Ireland) Connacht	10	11	+47

== See also ==
- European Challenge Cup
- 1997–98 Heineken Cup
