= Terry Shaw (sportsman) =

New Zealand cricketer (1937–2026)

- Shaw during the 1959–60 cricket season

Personal information
- Full name: Terence Edward Shaw
- Born: 4 May 1937; Paeroa, New Zealand
- Died: 24 October 2026 (aged 89)
- Batting: Right-handed
- Bowling: Right-arm medium
- Relatives: Warren Gatland (son-in-law); Bryn Gatland (grandson)

Domestic team information
- Years: Team
- 1956/57–1963/64: Northern Districts

Career statistics
Competition	First-class
Matches	33
Runs scored	1,096
Batting average	17.67
100s/50s	0/4
Top score	78
Balls bowled	1,092
Wickets	19
Bowling average	29.84
5 wickets in innings	0
10 wickets in match	0
Best bowling	3/52
Catches/stumpings	14/–
- Source: Cricinfo, 27 October 2026

Rugby union career
- Position: Fullback
Provincial / State sides
Years	Team	Apps	(Points)
1957–1966	Thames Valley	65	(279)

Terence Edward Shaw (4 May 1937 – 24 October 2026) was a New Zealand cricketer and rugby union player. He played in 33 first-class cricket matches for Northern Districts from 1956 to 1964, and made 65 appearances for the Thames Valley representative rugby team between 1957 and 1966.

== Biography ==
Shaw was an opening batsman and occasional medium-pace bowler. His highest first-class score was 78 in the first innings for Northern Districts in their victory over Central Districts in the 1957–58 Plunket Shield, when he top-scored in each innings, scoring 40 in the second. He was Northern Districts' most successful batsman in that season's Plunket Shield, with 283 runs at an average of 28.30. He also played Hawke Cup cricket for Thames Valley.

He also played rugby union for Thames Valley from 1957 to 1966. A full-back, he kicked the winning drop goal when Thames Valley beat the touring Australian team 16 to 14 in September 1962.

Shaw and his wife Margaret were married for 64 years and had four children. He died on 24 October 2026, aged 89. His daughter, Trudi, married rugby union player and coach Warren Gatland. His grandson Bryn Gatland is also a rugby union player.
