= Chris John (rugby union) =

New Zealand rugby union player (born 1960)

- Born: 25 August 1960 (age 66) Wellington, New Zealand
- Height: 1.76 m (5 ft 9 in)
- Weight: 65 kg (143 lb)

Rugby union career
International career
Years	Team	Apps	(Points)
1990	New Zealand	2	(0)

Chris John (born 25 August 1960) is a former New Zealand rugby union player. She made her debut off the bench for the Black Ferns at RugbyFest 1990 against the Netherlands and started in the match against the Soviet Union.
