= Jimmy Duffy (rugby union) =

- School: St Joseph's Patrician College

Rugby union career
- Position(s): Lock, number eight
Provincial / State sides
Years	Team	Apps	(Points)
1998-	Connacht		
Coaching career
- Years: Team
- 2015-2021: Connacht (forwards)
- 2022: Ireland under-20 (forwards)
- 2022-24: Western Force (forwards)
- 2024-2026: Ulster (forwards)
- 2026-: Munster (forwards)

Jimmy Duffy is an Irish rugby union coach. As of 2026 he is forwards coach for Munster. He was previously forwards coach for Connacht, Ireland under-20s, Western Force and Ulster.

Born in Galway, he played association football at underage level, and had trials with Everton, Nottingham Forest and Manchester City. He also played Gaelic football for St James'. He attended St Joseph's Patrician College, where he started playing rugby at the age of 15, playing at lock or number eight, and won the Connacht Schools' Cup in 1994. He represented Ireland at under-21 and 'A' level, and played provincial rugby for Connacht, making more than 20 appearances, but had to retire from playing at 20 after being diagnosed with a heart condition.

After three years away from rugby, he started coaching at Our Lady's Boys Club. He worked as an elite player development officer for the Connacht academy and as a coach development officer at grassroots level, before being appointed Connacht's forwards coach under Pat Lam in 2015. He was part of the Connacht coaching team that led the province to the 2015-16 Pro12 title. He worked under Lam's successor Andy Friend from 2018, but turned down a contract extension in 2021. He became forwards coach for the Ireland under-20s, under head coach Richie Murphy, for the grand-slam winning 2022 under-20 Six Nations campaign, then joined Australian franchise Western Force as forwards coach. After two seasons in Super Rugby, he left in 2024 to join Ulster as forwards coach, reuniting with head coach Richie Murphy. He moved to Munster as forwards coach ahead of the 2026-27 season.
