= Bryn Gatland =

New Zealand rugby union footballer and coach (1995-)

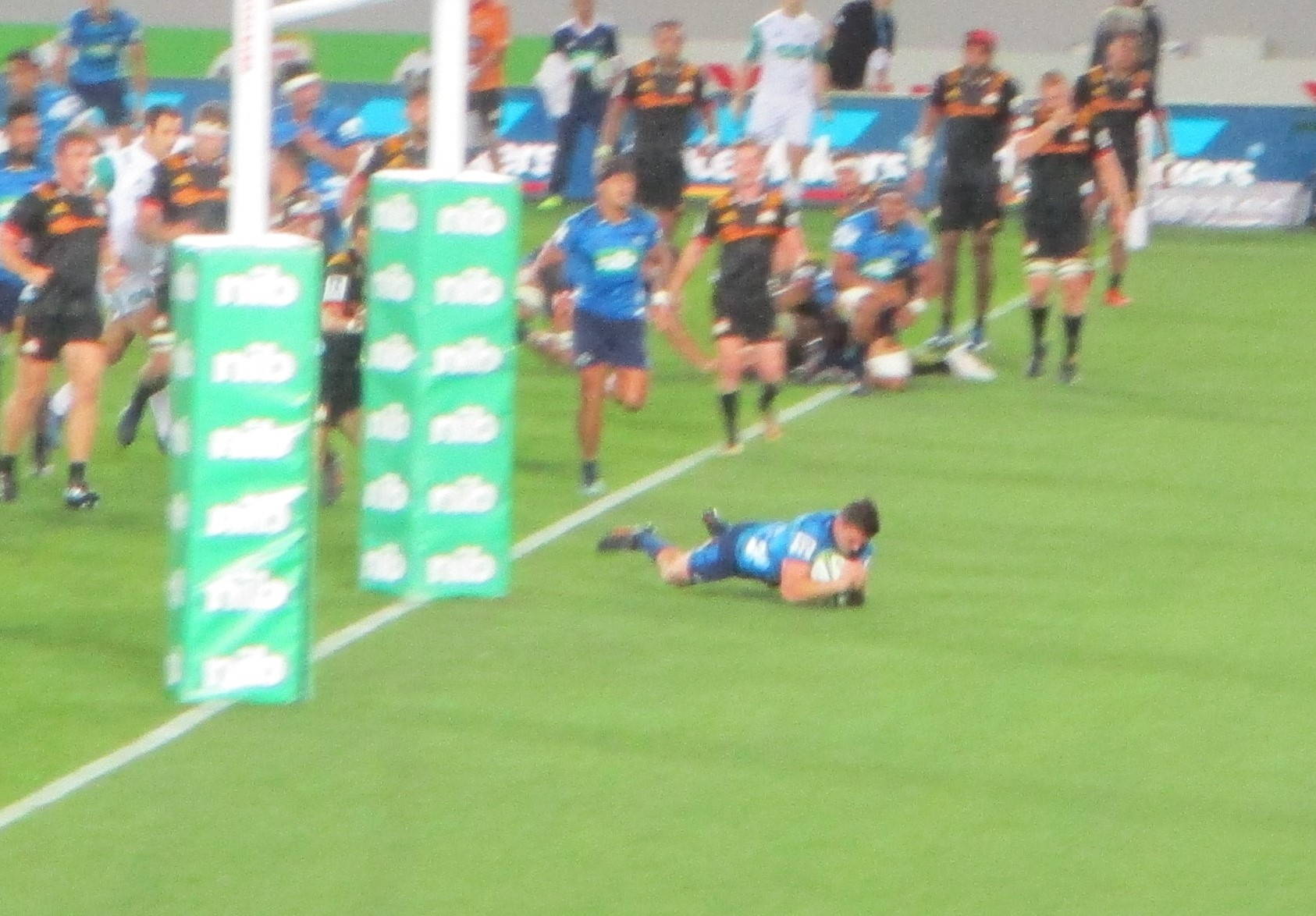
- Gatland playing at Eden Park against the Chiefs, March 2018
- Born: 10 May 1995 (age 31) Huntly, New Zealand
- Height: 178 cm (5 ft 10 in)
- Weight: 88 kg (194 lb; 13 st 12 lb)
- School: Hamilton Boys' High School
- Notable relatives: Warren Gatland (father); Terry Shaw (grandfather)

Rugby union career
- Position(s): First five-eighth, Centre
- Current team: Kobelco Steelers
Senior career
Years	Team	Apps	(Points)
2015	Waikato	1	(0)
2016–2023	North Harbour	59	(647)
2017–2018	Blues	15	(60)
2019–2020	Highlanders	8	(9)
2021–2023	Chiefs	32	(176)
2023–	Kobelco Steelers	51	(513)
- Correct as of 15 September 2024
International career
Years	Team	Apps	(Points)
2017	New Zealand Barbarians	1	(2)
- Correct as of 1 November 2023

Bryn Gatland (born 10 May 1995) is a New Zealand rugby union player who currently plays as a fly-half for Kobelco Kobe Steelers in Japan's Rugby League One. Gatland is the son of international coach and former player Warren Gatland.

== Early career ==
Born and raised in Waikato, Gatland attended Southwell School where he played first XI cricket team and first XV rugby team. Later while at Hamilton Boys' High School, his late drop goal in the final helped Boys High lift the 2013 Top 4 first XV title against Saint Kentigern College.

== Senior career ==
Gatland made the Waikato squad for the 2015 ITM Cup, but due to the emergence of future All Black Damian McKenzie in the number 10 jersey, his game time was limited to just a solitary substitute appearance against the Bay of Plenty. The signings of the new Fly Halves, Sam Christie and Stephen Donald for 2016 prompted Gatland to head north to Auckland and try his luck with North Harbour.

His decision to move to Harbour proved to be an enlightened one as his form at Fly Half saw the more experienced Matt McGahan shifted to fullback to accommodate him. Gatland played all 12 games during the 2016 season and scored 123 points as North Harbour won the Mitre 10 Cup Championship with an upset victory away to Otago and secured a place in the 2017 Premiership.

On 8 April 2017, Gatland was named on the Blues bench for the match against the Highlanders to cover for the injured Ihaia West. However he was not used and did not make his Super Rugby debut.

A week later, on 15 April 2017, he made his debut from the bench against the Hurricanes. He converted a try and a penalty kick, scoring his first Super Rugby points.

Gatland became a regular starter for the Blues in the 2018 Super Rugby season, with injuries to Stephen Perofeta and Otere Black.
