= Christophe Porcu =

French rugby union player (born 1971)

- Born: 5 May 1971 (age 55) Mauvezin, Gers, France
- Height: 1.93 m (6 ft 4 in)
- Weight: 123 kg (19 st 5 lb)
- Occupation: Rugby union coach

Rugby union career
- Position: Lock
Senior career
Years	Team	Apps	(Points)
1985-1994	Auch		
1994-2002	Agen		
2002-2006	USA Perpignan		
2006-2007	Torreilles		
2008-2008	USA Perpignan		
- Correct as of 7 August 2006
International career
Years	Team	Apps	(Points)
2002-2002	France	10	(00)

Christophe Porcu (born 5 May 1971 in Mauvezin, Gers, France) is a French international rugby union player. He played as a Lock for Agen and USA Perpignan. He started his career at SU Agen but he moved in 2002 to USA Perpignan where he was finalist of the Heineken Cup in 2003. He left Perpignan for playing Fédérale 3 with Torreilles but after one season he returned to USA Perpignan.
