= Warren Gatland =

New Zealand rugby union coach

Warren Gatland CBE
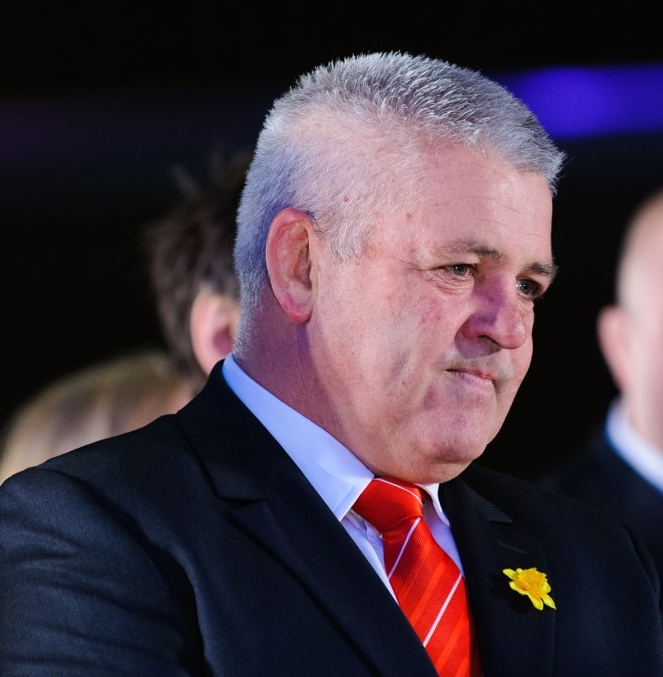
- Gatland in March 2012
- Born: Warren David Gatland; 17 September 1963 (age 63) Hamilton, New Zealand
- Height: 1.88 m (6 ft 2 in)
- Weight: 95 kg (209 lb)
- School: Hamilton Boys' High School
- University: University of Waikato
- Notable relatives: Bryn Gatland (son); Terry Shaw (father-in-law)

Rugby union career
- Position: Hooker
Provincial / State sides
Years	Team	Apps	(Points)
1986–1994	Waikato	140	
International career
Years	Team	Apps	(Points)
1988–1991	New Zealand	17	(0)
Coaching career
- Years: Team
- 1989–1994: Galwegians RFC
- 1994–1996: Thames Valley (assistant)
- 1996–1998: Connacht
- 1998–2001: Ireland
- 2002–2005: London Wasps
- 2005–2007: Waikato
- 2006–2007: Chiefs (technical advisor)
- 2007–2019: Wales
- 2009: British & Irish Lions (assistant)
- 2013–2021: British & Irish Lions
- 2020–2021: Chiefs
- 2021–2022: Chiefs (director of rugby)
- 2022–2025: Wales

Warren David Gatland CBE (born 17 September 1963) is a New Zealand former rugby union player and the former head coach of the Ireland national team and then the Wales national team.

As a player, he was a hooker and was one of Waikato's longest-serving players, playing 140 games for the province – a record at the time. Gatland launched his coaching career as a player/coach for Taupiri in 1989, and after the All Blacks' 1989 tour, he remained in Ireland to act as a player/coach for Galwegians RFC leading them to promotion into the All-Ireland League Division 2. In 1994, he became assistant coach to Thames Valley in New Zealand. In 1996, he returned to Ireland and became the director of rugby at Connacht, leading them to the quarter-finals of the 1997–98 European Challenge Cup. From 1998 he coached Ireland; London Wasps; where he won three Premierships and the Heineken Cup; and Waikato, with whom he won the Air New Zealand Cup.

As head coach of Wales from 2007 to 2019, he won three Six Nations titles, which were all Grand Slams, and reached the semi-finals of the 2011 and 2019 Rugby World Cups. Gatland was head coach of the British & Irish Lions on three tours: the 2013 British & Irish Lions tour to Australia, when they won the test series 2–1; the 2017 New Zealand tour, when the series was drawn; and the 2021 tour to South Africa, losing the series 2–1.

He coached Chiefs between 2020 and 2022, before returning to Wales in December 2022. He departed the head coach role mid-way through the 2025 Six Nations, after consistent losses in the Six Nations tournament for three years running.

== Early life and family ==
Gatland was born in Hamilton, New Zealand, on 17 September 19634, and educated at Hamilton Boys' High School and the University of Waikato. In about 1994, he married Trudi Shaw, the daughter of cricketer and rugby union player Terry Shaw, and the couple had three children, including Bryn Gatland. Their first child was born with spina bifida, and died aged four months.

== Playing career ==
Gatland played 17 non-international matches for New Zealand, but never won an international cap. His first game as an All Black was in 1988, when he is said to have introduced a Australian rules based game to the training sessions, which was well received by the other players.

Gatland became the record-holder of the most games for Waikato near the end of the 1994 season. He finished the season with 140 games in total and announced his retirement before the start of the 1995 season.

== Coaching career ==
Gatland launched his coaching career as a player/coach for Taupiri in 1989, and after the All Blacks' 1989 tour, he remained in Ireland to act as a player/coach for Galwegians RFC leading them to promotion into the All-Ireland League Division 2.

After retiring from the club in 1994, he became assistant coach to Thames Valley in New Zealand. He coached the team to promotion from the third division to the second in the National Provincial Championship. In 1996, he returned to Ireland and became the director of rugby at Connacht, leading them to the quarter-finals of the 1997–98 European Challenge Cup after twice beating Northampton Saints in the pool stages.

=== Ireland ===
On 24 February 1998, after Brian Ashton resigned after round one of the 1998 Five Nations Championship, Gatland was appointed coach of Ireland. His first match in charge was against a rampant French side who had already scored over 70 points in their opening two fixtures. However, Gatland led Ireland to a close 18–16 defeat at the Stade de France in Paris. Ireland finished in last place with zero points. Gatland quickly improved Ireland's performances. This included a 29–23 victory over the Welsh in the 1999 Five Nations Championship and a 32–24 win over Argentina. Ireland had a disappointing 1999 Rugby World Cup campaign and failed to make it to the quarter-finals after losing narrowly to Argentina in a play-off game 28–24.

On 19 March 2000, Ireland beat France in Paris for the first time since 1972, when a hat-trick of tries from Brian O'Driscoll led them to a 27–25 win. Ireland also beat France at Lansdowne Road in the return fixture in the 2001 Six Nations Championship. Ireland also beat Italy in a six-try romp, 60–13 in Dublin. In 2001, Gatland's last year as coach, Ireland finished the championship with the same points as winners England, losing on points difference. In the same year, Gatland's Irish team played against the touring All Blacks, losing 29–40 in Gatland's last match in charge of Ireland. He was sacked and was replaced by his assistant coach Eddie O'Sullivan. Overall, Gatland moved Ireland from eighth to sixth in the IRB World Rankings, with a 47% win rate.

=== London Wasps ===
After losing his job with Ireland, he joined the coaching staff at London Wasps under director of rugby Nigel Melville. The team was bottom of the Premiership at this time, but Gatland helped steer them away from the relegation zone and develop one of the meanest defences in Europe. He took over as director of rugby when Melville left for Gloucester at the end of the 2001–02 season. Under Gatland's guidance, Wasps won three Premiership titles; in 2003, 2004 and 2005.

In Europe, Wasps won the 2002–03 European Challenge Cup, winning eight from eight matches, and beating Bath 48–30 away in the final. After qualifying for the Heineken Cup in the 2003–04 season, Wasps won the title, beating Toulouse 27–20 in the final. At the end of the 2004/2005 season, Gatland returned to New Zealand, where he was installed as coach at Waikato.

=== Return to New Zealand (Waikato) ===
On his return to New Zealand to coach Waikato in the National Provincial Championship (NPC), he led the side to seventh in the Division 1 table. However, under the new competition format, the Air New Zealand Cup in 2006, Gatland took Waikato to the final of the 2006 Air New Zealand Cup, beating Wellington in the final 37–31, losing only one match in the run up to the knock out stages. However, in the 2007 Air New Zealand Cup, Gatland was only able to lead Waikato to the quarter-finals, losing to 38–35 to Hawke's Bay. In addition to his role as head coach of Waikato, during the off-season, he acted as technical advisor for the Chiefs Super 14 team in 2006.

=== Wales ===
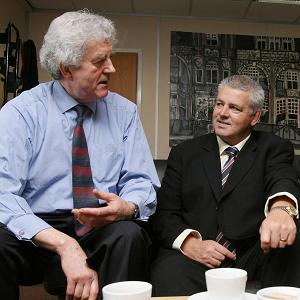
Gatland (right) meets First Minister of Wales Rhodri Morgan (left) in 2008

On 9 November 2007, Gatland was named head coach of Wales, and took up his position on 1 December 2007.

Gatland's first game as coach of Wales was in the opening week of the 2008 Six Nations Championship, which was a major upset as Wales beat England 26–19 after trailing 19–6 with nearly sixty minutes played. It was Wales' first win at Twickenham since 1988. After victories over Scotland and Italy, Wales went on to defeat the Triple Crown holders Ireland at Croke Park 16–12, thus winning the Triple Crown themselves. This was the first time Wales has held this trophy since 2005. In the final round of fixtures, Wales beat France at the Millennium Stadium 29–12, to clinch their 10th Grand Slam, 100 years after they won their first. Despite being Six Nations Champions, Gatland led Wales to a 2–0 test series defeat to South Africa during the 2008 mid-year rugby union tests, losing 43–17 and 37–21. Wales then went on to lose to South Africa at home during the 2008 Autumn internationals. Their Autumn campaign saw Wales win two, lose two – the two wins being a 34–13 win over Canada and a 21–18 win over Australia. This was Wales' first win over the Wallabies since 2005.

Wales were unable to retain their Six Nations title in 2009, finishing fourth with just three wins; England, Italy and Scotland. Due to his commitments to the British & Irish Lions, he was unable to coach Wales to their Summer tour of North America against Canada and the United States. However, he led the team in their 2009 Autumn internationals campaign, which consisted of wins against Samoa, and Argentina, but losses to New Zealand and Australia. Wales remained fourth in the 2010 Six Nations Championship, with victories over Italy and Scotland.

Their Summer tour consisted of a 2–0 test series defeat to the All Blacks (42–9 and 29–10), and their 2010 Autumn campaign saw Wales at best get a 16–16 draw with Fiji – losses to Australia, South Africa and New Zealand. For the third consecutive year, Wales finished fourth in the Six Nations table, but on top of their wins over Scotland and Italy, Gatland led Wales to their first victory over Ireland since 2008.

Gatland led Wales to fourth in the 2011 Rugby World Cup, winning three of their four Pool D matches; 17–10 win over Samoa, 81–7 win over Namibia and a record breaking 66–0 win over Fiji, their loss was a 17–16 defeat to the Springboks. Wales beat Ireland 22–10 in the quarter-final, but lost to France 9–8 in the semi-final. They lost the Bronze final to Australia 21–18 to finish fourth. This meant that Wales were ranked fourth in the world, their highest ever ranking again under Gatland, previously fourth in 2009.

In the 2012 Six Nations Championship, Gatland won a second Grand Slam in four years. However, Gatland was unable to see Wales' great form in their Summer tour of Australia, as in April 2012 Gatland broke both his heels while on holiday in New Zealand, and needed reconstructive surgery on his right heel. Initial hopes were that he would recover in time to lead Wales for their three-test tour, but on 19 April 2012 it was announced that he would not recover before the tour, and assistant coach Robert Howley was appointed as caretaker. Due to his success with Wales, Gatland was named head coach for the 2013 British & Irish Lions tour to Australia. This meant that Gatland was unable to coach Wales in their 2012 Autumn campaign, but was allowed to coach the side against Australia and New Zealand. With Wales suffering three defeats on their summer tour, and their winless Autumn campaign, Wales dropped to ninth in the IRB World Rankings, their second-lowest ever ranking and a position they had not been in since 2007, before Gatland's appointment.

Gatland returned to his post with Wales ahead of the 2013 Autumn internationals, where Wales claimed their first Autumn international win since 2009, when they beat Argentina 40–6, a record winning margin, in their second test of their campaign. Despite there being mostly Welsh players on the British & Irish Lions tour earlier that year, Wales failed to defeat Australia at home, going down 30–26 in their final match of the series. Gatland led Wales to third in the 2014 Six Nations Championship, defeating Italy 23–15 in their opening match, before they were convincingly beaten by Ireland a week later 26–3. They returned to winning ways when they beat France 27–6, however they lost to England at Twickenham to end any hopes of retaining their Championship. In their match of the Championship, Wales defeated a 14-man Scotland side, 51–3, a record winning margin. Ahead of Wales' 2014 South African tour, Wales were without key players, like Richard Hibbard, captain Sam Warburton and fullback Leigh Halfpenny. Despite this, and despite Wales' defeat in the first test 38–16, Wales were within seconds of beating South Africa in the second test, having led 17–14 at half time, with those 17 points being scored in the opening 22 minutes to lead 17–0. By the 65th minute, Wales led 30–17, but a Willie le Roux try brought South Africa within 6 points of a draw. With 2 minutes left on the clock, Wales conceded a penalty try to lose the match 31–30. Wales earned two victories during the 2014 autumn internationals, one of which came against the Springboks, 12–6. This was Wales' first victory over South Africa since 1999, and Wales' first victory over a Southern Hemisphere giant since 2008, ending a 22 match losing streak.

He was appointed an Officer of the Order of the British Empire (OBE) in the 2014 Birthday Honours for services to rugby.

Wales were within a chance of claiming the 2015 Six Nations Championship title heading into the final week. Having beaten Scotland, France, Ireland before the closing week, Ireland, England and Wales were all even on 6 points, while France were also still in contention on 4 points. For Wales to claim the title, they needed to beat Italy by 26 points or more to get ahead of England and Ireland. They defeated Italy by 41 points, winning 61–20 scoring 8 tries. However, Ireland overtook Wales when they beat Scotland 40–10, which meant when England won 55–35, Ireland retained their 2014 title. Gatland was heavily criticised ahead of the 2015 Rugby World Cup, having played some key players in Wales' final RWC warm-up, Wales lost Leigh Halfpenny and Rhys Webb to injury. Despite many injuries before and during the World Cup, Gatland guided the team out of the "pool of death", with victories over Uruguay 54–9, England 28–25 and Fiji 23–13. They played South Africa in the quarter-final, and with 5 minutes to go, Wales were leading 19–18, but a try to Springbok captain and scrum half Fourie du Preez, saw South Africa claim a 23–19 win.

During the 2016 Six Nations Championship, Gatland led Wales to second with 7 points, 3 points behind victors England. The Championship started with a 16–all draw against Ireland in Dublin, before Wales went on to secure a 27–23 victory over Scotland in Cardiff. They backed up the Scottish victory with a 19–10 win over the French, before going down to England 25–21. At one point in that match, Wales were down 19–0, but scored three tries in the second half to come with in 4 points of the victory. In the final match, Wales earned their biggest winning margin in a six nations match, winning by 53 points in a 67–14 victory over Italy. In June 2016, Gatland took Wales on a three-test series against the world champions New Zealand. The All Blacks were without many of their World Cup winning side, with Dan Carter, Richie McCaw, Keven Mealamu, Ma'a Nonu and Conrad Smith all retiring. The first test saw Wales put up a convincing display, leading the World Champions 18–15 at half time. However, Wales dropped off after the 60th minute, conceding three tries to lose the game 39–21. Wales then went down to Super Rugby side the Chiefs, 40–7 in a mid-week match. In the second test, the teams were level after 40 minutes 10–all, but 26 unanswered points in the second half, including 4 tries with in 15 minutes saw the All Blacks secure the series after winning 36–22. The final test saw New Zealand clinch the series 3–0, winning 46–6.

Following a sabbatical from Wales due to his 2017 British and Lions commitments, Gatland led Wales to 2 victories in four matches during the 2017 Autumn Internationals, defeating Georgia in the countries first ever meeting, 13–6, and South Africa 24–22. Their defeats came at the hand of Australia 29–21 and New Zealand 33–18. In the buildup to the 2018 Six Nations Championship, Gatland stated that Wales "will win the Six Nations". His statement was backed up after Wales convincingly beat Scotland 34–7 in the opening round, earning themselves their first ever try bonus point. The following week, despite keeping England scoreless for 60 minutes, Wales lost 12–6. In round three, Wales came within moments of stealing the game from Ireland, only losing by 3 points in over time. However, an intercept from Jacob Stockdale, saw Wales go down to Ireland 37–27, ending their chance of winning the Six Nations. In rounds 4 and 5, Wales returned to winning ways, defeating Italy 38–14 and France 14–13 to finish the Championship in second behind victors Ireland.

In June 2018, Gatland led his side to three from three victories, defeating South Africa in Washington, D.C. in a one-off test match 22–20, before securing a 2–0 series win over Argentina. The first test victory (23–10) was Wales' first win in Argentina since 2004, and with the second test victory, meant Wales won a first series over Argentina since 1999.

In the buildup to the 2019 Six Nations Championship, Gatland said that should Wales start off the campaign with a victory over France, "we can win it given we have home games against England and Ireland." Down 0–16 after the first half in Paris, Wales rallied to win 24–19, and subsequent wins over Italy (26–15), England (21–13), Scotland (18–11) and Ireland (25–7) saw them win the Grand Slam, stretching their winning run to 14, breaking their previous record of 11 set in 1910, and making Gatland the first-ever coach to win three Grand Slams in the Five or Six Nations era.

At the 2019 Rugby World Cup, Gatland repeated the success of the 2011 tournament by taking Wales to a World Cup semi-final after they finished top of Pool D with four wins from four. Wales then faced France in a thrilling come-from-behind 20–19 victory, after France's Sébastien Vahaamahina was shown a red card for an elbow to Aaron Wainwright's face. Gatland admitted after the match that he believed that France were "the better team", and had deserved to win. After Wales' subsequent 16–19 loss to South Africa in the semi-final, as well as England's win over New Zealand beforehand, Gatland stated that it would have been "his dream" to face England in his final game in charge of Wales. As it was, Wales played their final game of the tournament, and Gatland's final game as Head Coach (prior to his reappointment in 2022) against New Zealand in the bronze medal match - a convincing 40–17 win for the All Blacks.

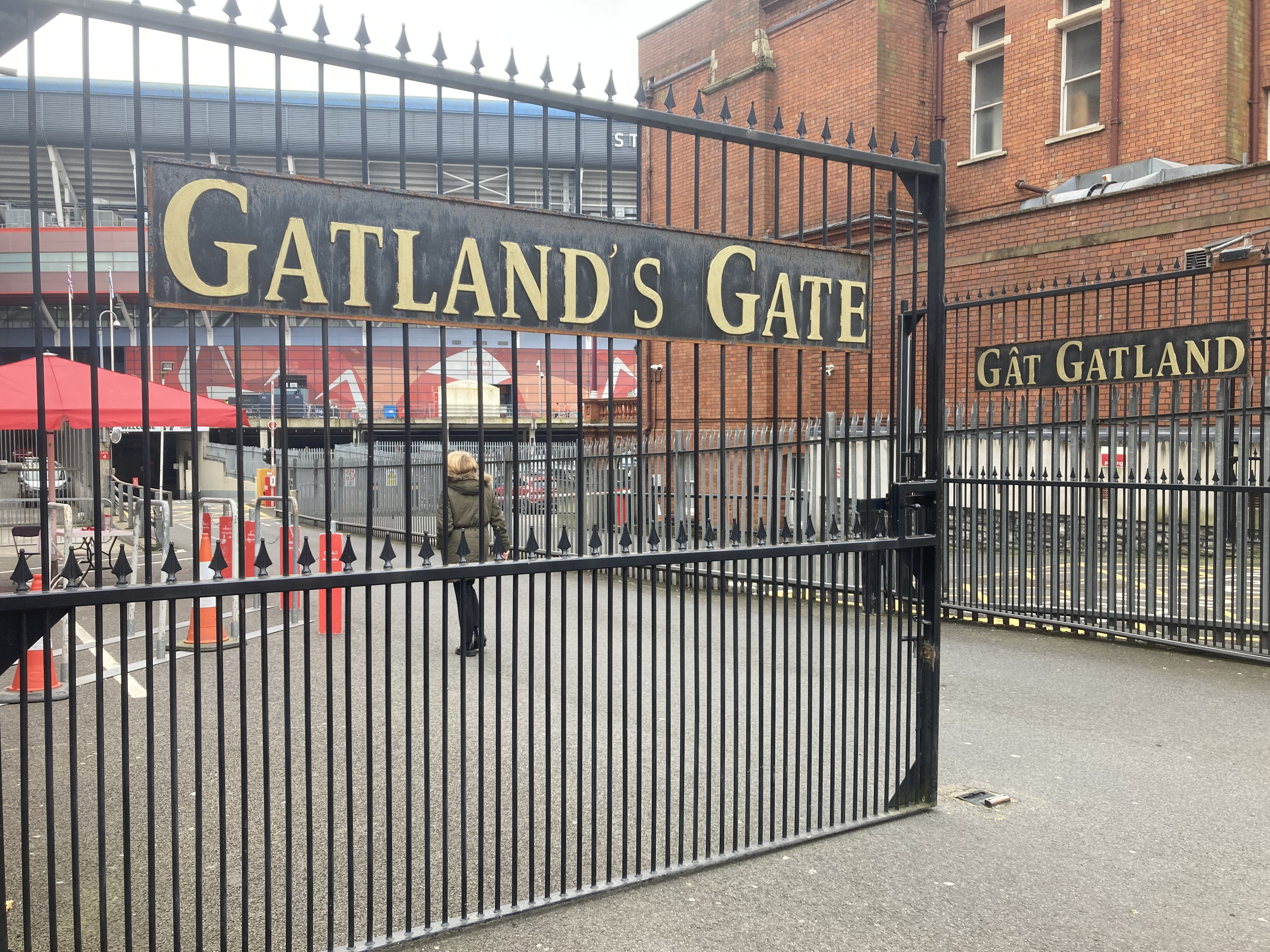
"Gatland's Gate" at the Principality Stadium in Cardiff.

Following the conclusion of the World Cup in 2019, the WRU announced that they would honour the departing coach by naming Gate 4 of the Millenium Stadium "Gatland's Gate" (Welsh: Gât Gatland) an honour previously only given to the legendary Welsh player, Gwyn Nicholls.

=== British & Irish Lions ===
For the 2009 tour of South Africa, Gatland was named as an assistant coach, specialising as the forwards coach under Ian McGeechan.

In March 2012, in the wake of his second Six Nations Grand Slam with Wales, he was interviewed for the position of head coach for the Lions' 2013 tour of Australia, before being appointed in September that year. The Lions won the test series against Australia 2–1. He was given a 10-month contract with the Lions, taking a sabbatical from coaching Wales, although he did coach Wales against Australia and New Zealand in the 2012 Autumn internationals. Gatland promised impartial selection and said he believed that Graham Henry in 2001 picked too many Welsh players who were insufficiently good for the tour. He named Rob Howley, Graham Rowntree, Andy Farrell and Neil Jenkins as his assistants for the tour.

During the tour, Gatland led the Lions to a 2–1 series victory over the Wallabies, the first series win since the 1997 tour of South Africa. Including the non-test matches, Gatland coached the Lions to win eight out of the ten matches played, the losses coming against Australia in the second test, and the Brumbies in a mid week match. In the first test, he named ten Welsh players in the match day-23, four Irish, eight English and one Scot. This team won the first test 23–21, following a missed penalty by Kurtley Beale post 80 minutes. His team in the second test, consisting of nine Welsh, six Irish, seven English and one Scot, lost the test in Melbourne 16–15. In the third test, Gatland was heavily criticised for naming 11 Welsh players in the matchday squad, as well as for the dropping of Brian O'Driscoll. Despite this, the Lions won the final test 41–16, which was a record winning margin for the Lions against Australia.

Since the 2013 tour, Warren Gatland has been very vocal over his desire to lead the Lions in 2017 against his home nation New Zealand. In December 2013 Gatland was named UK coach of the year at the 2013 UK Coaching Awards.

In March 2015, he was criticised, by former Irish international Neil Francis, who described him as having "the intellectual capacity of a tub of Flora."

On 7 September 2016, Gatland was announced as head coach for the 2017 Lions Team.

Gatland this time took a full 10-month sabbatical from Wales, handing his coaching reins to Rob Howley. Gatland wanted continuity in his coaching staff, with the only change being Steve Borthwick coming in as forwards coach, while retaining Rob Howley as attack coach and Andy Farrell as defence coach. Graham Rowntree and Neil Jenkins remained, however specialising in scrummaging and kicking. On 19 April, Gatland and his team named a 41-man squad, consisting of 16 English, 12 Welsh, 11 Irish and 2 Scottish players. His Welsh captain Sam Warburton remained as captain. Gatland was heavily criticised for the lack of Scottish players in squad, considering Scotland had beaten both Ireland and Wales during the 2017 Six Nations Championship. The criticism continued into the tour, especially after he called up 6 players to the squad on 17 June (a further 4 Welsh players) that was based purely on geography rather than skill. He was depicted as a clown in the New Zealand media after he continued to complain about "foul" tactics of the All Blacks.

Despite all the criticism from both British and New Zealand press and fans, Gatland persisted with his style and selections and gained 4 wins in the non-test games; New Zealand Provincial Barbarians (13–7), Crusaders (12–3), Māori All Blacks (32–10) and Chiefs (34–6). In the test series, Gatland led the Lions to a single victory, winning the second test 24–21, to become the first team to beat New Zealand at home since South Africa in 2009. It was the Lions first win over the All Blacks in the professional era, with the last victory coming in 1993, coached by Ian McGeechan, 20–7. With the first test being won by the All Blacks 30–15 and the third and final test being drawn 15–15, the test series was drawn, with the draw being the first time since 1994 that the All Blacks has failed to win at Eden Park. The series was the first drawn series since their 1955 tour to South Africa.

Following the tour, Gatland was in the running to be the next All Blacks head coach.

Gatland was promoted to Commander of the Order of the British Empire (CBE) in the 2020 Birthday Honours for services to rugby in Wales.

In 2019 Gatland was once again named head coach of the British and Irish Lions ahead of their 2021 tour of South Africa. South Africa won the series by two games to one.

=== Chiefs ===
On 28 June 2019, it was announced Gatland would return home to Hamilton to coach the Chiefs on a four-year deal which would include a sabbatical in 2021 to coach the British & Irish Lions. His first season in charge was a disaster, with his side losing all eight games in the Super Rugby Aotearoa competition. This led to him being voted as the worst coach in the competition. In December 2022, Gatland left his role at the Chiefs and returned to coach the Welsh national team.

=== Return to Wales ===
In December 2022, Wales head coach Wayne Pivac, who had replaced Gatland, was sacked by the Welsh Rugby Union after a poor period of results. Gatland returned to Wales on a contract to take him through to the 2023 Rugby World Cup. The contract also contains the potential to extend another four years, through the 2027 Rugby World Cup.

The 2023 Six Nations Championship saw Gatland's Wales fall to a second consecutive finish in fifth place, after only winning one match away against Italy in the fourth round of the competition. During this tournament, player disputes with the WRU nearly caused the Welsh players to go on strike before the match against England on 25 February 2023 - on which Gatland commented of his players that there had been "quite a significant split in the group" over the option to strike - the match, a 10–20 loss for Wales, eventually went ahead.

Gatland's Wales went on to show signs of improvement during the warm-up matches played in the summer of 2023, despite only winning one of their three tests. This form continued during the pool stages of the 2023 Rugby World Cup in France, where Wales won all of their matches in Pool C: a narrow 32–26 victory against Fiji, a 28–8 win over Portugal, a record-breaking 40–6 win over Australia, and a 43–19 victory against Georgia. Wales finished top of their pool with 19 out of a possible 20 points, taking Wales to a fourth consecutive Rugby World Cup quarter-final under Gatland. Wales would lose to Argentina in the quarterfinals.

Gatland offered his resignation following Wales' sixth-place finish in the 2024 Six Nations Championship. Wales finished the tournament with no wins including a loss to Italy at the Millennium Stadium. This was Wales' first wooden spoon finish in 21 years. His resignation offer was rejected by the WRU. In November 2024, Gatland's Wales lost 24–19 to Fiji in the Autumn Nations Series. This was their tenth loss in a row, equalling a record set by head coach Steve Hansen from 2002 to 2003. It was also the first time Wales had ever lost to Fiji at the Millenium Stadium. A week later Wales went on to lose against Australia extending their losing run to eleven, breaking Hansen's record.

In February 2025, following 22–15 defeat to Italy, after a 14th consecutive defeat in all competitions, and with Wales dropping to 12th in the world rankings, he departed the head coach role with immediate effect mid-way through the 2025 Six Nations.

== Statistics ==
Team	Years	Pld	W	D	L	Win%	PF	PA
Ireland	1998–2001	38	18	1	19	47.37%	1,127	884
Wales	2008–2019	125	70	2	53	56.00%	2,995	2,565
British & Irish Lions	2013–2021	10	5	1	4	50.00%	165	167
Wales	2022–2025	26	6	0	20	23.08%	323	342
Total		199	99	4	96	49.75%	4,567	3,902

== Honours ==
=== Ireland ===
- Six Nations Championship
  - Runner-up: 2001
- Millennium Trophy
  - Winner: 2001
- Centenary Quaich
  - Winner: 2000

=== London Wasps ===
- English Premiership
  - Winner: 2002–03, 2003–04, 2004–05
- Heineken Cup
  - Winner: 2003–04
- European Challenge Cup
  - Winner: 2002–03

=== Waikato ===
- Air New Zealand Cup
  - Winner: 2006

=== Wales ===
- Six Nations Championship (* = Grand Slam)
  - Winner: 2008*, 2012*,2013, 2019*
  - Runner-up: 2016, 2018

=== British & Irish Lions ===
- Tom Richards Cup
  - Winner: 2013
- Lions–New Zealand test series
  - Winner: 2017 (shared)
- BBC Sports Personality of the Year Coach Award
  - Winner: 2013
- BBC Sports Personality Team of the Year Award
  - Winner: 2013

== Outside rugby ==
In 2012, Gatland made a cameo appearance as himself in an episode of the UK TV comedy drama Stella. The same year, he was honoured by the University of Waikato as one of the year's three distinguished alumni. In 2022, Gatland received an honorary fellowship from Cardiff University.

Gatland published his autobiography, Pride and Passion, in November 2019.

Preceded by (England) Brian Ashton	Ireland National Rugby Union Coach; 1998–2001	Succeeded by (Ireland) Eddie O'Sullivan
Preceded by (Wales) Nigel Davies (Interim)	Wales National Rugby Union Coach; 2007–2019	Succeeded by (New Zealand) Wayne Pivac
Preceded by (Scotland) Ian McGeechan (2007)	British & Irish Lions Head Coach; 2013, 2017, 2021	Succeeded by (England) Andy Farrell (2025)
Preceded by (New Zealand) Wayne Pivac	Wales National Rugby Union Coach; 2022–2025	Succeeded by (England) Matt Sherratt (caretaker coach)
