= Conor McGuinness =

Irish rugby union player (born 1975)

- Full name: Conor Dermot McGuinness
- Born: 29 March 1975 (age 51) Dublin, Ireland
- Height: 5 ft 10 in (178 cm)
- School: St Mary's College

Rugby union career
- Position: Scrum-half
Provincial / State sides
Years	Team	Apps	(Points)
- Connacht
International career
Years	Team	Apps	(Points)
1997–99	Ireland	14	(5)

Conor Dermot McGuinness (born 29 March 1975) is an Irish former rugby union international.

McGuinness, a scrum-half from Dublin, played for St Mary's College and Connacht.

In the late 1990s, McGuinness represented Ireland as a scrum-half in 14 Test matches, debuting against the All Blacks at Lansdowne Road in 1997. He was widely regarded as the best player on field in Ireland's two-point loss to France in Paris during the 1998 Five Nations Championship. His run as Ireland's scrum-half ended in 1999 when he lost his place in the side to Tom Tierney, only a few months before that year's Rugby World Cup.

McGuinness's career was hampered by a serious foot injury which required multiple operations.

== See also ==
- List of Ireland national rugby union players
