= Pat Duignan =

Ireland international rugby union player

Patrick Duignan (born 1 May 1972 in Canada) is a former rugby footballer, an Irish representative three-quarter who played in two qualifying matches of the 1999 Rugby World Cup.

Born in Canada and raised in Australia, Duignan has twice played internationally for Ireland. He made 88 appearances in the Celtic League in 2001-2002 for Connacht.

Patrick attended Hawkesbury Agricultural College and was a member of their 1st XV in the period 1993–1995.

In 2003 and 2004 in Australia he coached 1st Grade at NSW suburban 2nd division club Petersham. He also made some appearances as a player-coach in his time at the club. Pat was known as "Two Caps" at Petersham for his two Irish internationals.

Following his involvement with Petersham he was General Manager at Randwick Rugby Club in 2005–06.
