= 1997–98 European Challenge Cup =

1997–1998 European Challenge Cup

Tournament details
- Countries: England; France; Ireland; Italy; Romania; Scotland; Wales
- Tournament format(s): Round-robin and Knockout
- Date: 6 September 1997 to 2 February 1998

Tournament statistics
- Teams: 32
- Top point scorer(s): Laurent Labit (Colomiers); Christophe Reigt (Stade Français) (108 points)
- Top try scorer(s): Marc Biboulet (Colomiers); Emori Bolobolo (Stade Français); David Bory (Montferrand) (8 tries)

Final
- Champions: (France) Colomiers (1st title)
- Runners-up: (France) Agen

The 1997–98 European Challenge Cup was the second year of the European Challenge Cup, the second tier rugby union cup competition below the Heineken Cup. The tournament was held between September 1997 and February 1998

== Pool stage ==
=== Pool 1 ===
Team	P	W	D	L	Tries for	Tries against	Try diff	Points for	Points against	Points diff	Pts
(France) Agen	6	6	0	0	27	12	+15	219	105	+114	12
(England) Bristol	6	2	0	4	16	22	−6	115	180	−65	4
(Wales) Ebbw Vale	6	2	0	4	12	17	−5	117	155	−38	4
(France) La Rochelle	6	2	0	4	11	15	−4	128	139	−11	4

=== Pool 2 ===
Team	P	W	D	L	Tries for	Tries against	Try diff	Points for	Points against	Points diff	Pts
(France) AS Montferrand	6	5	0	1	28	11	+17	203	120	+83	10
(Wales) Newport	6	3	0	3	20	27	−7	172	192	−20	6
(England) Sale Sharks	6	3	0	3	18	13	5	163	117	+46	6
(France) Montpellier	6	1	0	5	12	27	−15	90	199	−109	2

=== Pool 3 ===
Team	P	W	D	L	Tries for	Tries against	Try diff	Points for	Points against	Points diff	Pts
(France) Stade Français	6	5	0	1	48	18	+30	337	131	+206	10
(England) London Irish	6	4	0	2	18	14	4	169	133	+36	8
(France) Dax	6	3	0	3	14	20	−6	139	180	−41	6
(Romania) Farul Constanţa	6	0	0	6	10	38	−28	94	295	−201	0

=== Pool 4 ===
Team	P	W	D	L	Tries for	Tries against	Try diff	Points for	Points against	Points diff	Pts
(Ireland) Connacht	6	5	0	1	11	13	−2	144	97	+47	10
(England) Northampton Saints	6	3	0	3	17	13	+4	161	116	+45	6
(France) Bordeaux-Begles	6	3	0	3	10	6	+4	112	110	+2	6
(France) Nice	6	1	0	5	14	20	−6	94	188	−94	2

=== Pool 5 ===
Team	P	W	D	L	Tries for	Tries against	Try diff	Points for	Points against	Points diff	Pts
(France) Colomiers	6	6	0	0	40	13	+27	290	121	+169	12
(England) Richmond	6	4	0	2	28	15	+13	196	133	+63	8
(Wales) Bridgend RFC	6	2	0	4	12	37	−25	130	259	−129	4
(France) Grenoble	6	0	0	6	9	24	−15	112	215	−103	0

=== Pool 6 ===
Team	P	W	D	L	Tries for	Tries against	Try diff	Points for	Points against	Points diff	Pts
(England) Gloucester	6	5	0	1	19	12	+7	170	101	+69	10
(France) Toulon	6	3	1	2	12	7	+5	136	104	+32	7
(France) Béziers	6	2	1	3	18	14	+4	150	147	+3	5
(Italy) Petrarca Rugby	6	0	2	4	13	29	−16	108	212	−104	2

=== Pool 7 ===
Team	P	W	D	L	Tries for	Tries against	Try diff	Points for	Points against	Points diff	Pts
(England) Newcastle Falcons	6	5	0	1	36	8	+28	264	98	+166	10
(France) Biarritz Olympique	6	3	0	3	10	17	−7	123	153	−30	6
(France) Perpignan	6	2	0	4	12	13	−1	98	138	−40	4
(Scotland) Edinburgh	6	2	0	4	9	29	−20	109	205	−96	4

=== Pool 8 ===
Team	P	W	D	L	Tries for	Tries against	Try diff	Points for	Points against	Points diff	Pts
(France) Castres Olympique	6	5	0	1	26	10	+16	206	97	+109	10
(England) Saracens	6	5	0	1	23	13	10	197	128	+69	10
(France) Narbonne	6	2	0	4	19	14	+5	168	138	+30	4
(Wales) Neath	6	0	0	6	10	41	−31	93	301	−208	0

== Qualifiers ==
Seed	Pool Winners	Pts	TF	+/−
1	(France) Colomiers	12	40	+169
2	(France) Agen	12	27	+114
3	(France) Stade Français	10	48	+206
4	(England) Newcastle Falcons	10	36	+166
5	(France) Montferrand	10	28	+83
6	(France) Castres Olympique	10	26	+109
7	(England) Gloucester	10	19	+69
8	(Ireland) Connacht	10	11	+47

== Knockout stage ==
=== Quarter-finals ===
8 November 1997
14:15

Stade Français (France)	53–22	(England) Gloucester

Stade Jean-Bouin

8 November 1997
20:00

Agen (France)	40–27	(Ireland) Connacht

Stade Armandie

9 November 1997
15:00

Colomiers (France)	23–13	(France) AS Montferrand

Stade Selery

9 November 1997
15:00

Newcastle Falcons (England)	44–0	(France) Castres Olympique

Kingston Park Stadium

=== Semi-finals ===
20 December 1997
14:15

Agen (France)	12–9	(England) Newcastle Falcons

Stade Armandie
Attendance: 6,000

20 December 1997
15:00

Colomiers (France)	19–13	(France) Stade Français

Stade Selery
Attendance: 4,500

=== Final ===
2 February 1998
15:15

Colomiers (France)	43–5	(France) Agen

Les Sept Deniers
Attendance: 12,500

== See also ==
- European Challenge Cup
- 1997-98 Heineken Cup
