= 2003–04 Munster Rugby season =

- Ground(s): Thomond Park (Capacity: 13,200); Musgrave Park (Capacity: 8,300)
- CEO: Garrett Fitzgerald
- Coach: Alan Gaffney
- Captain: Jim Williams
- League: Celtic League
- 2003–04: 7th

The 2003–04 Munster Rugby season was Munster's third season competing in the Celtic League, alongside which they also competed in the Heineken Cup. It was Alan Gaffney's first season as head coach.

== 2003–04 squad ==
Note: Flags indicate national union under World Rugby eligibility rules. Players may hold more than one non-World Rugby nationality.

Player	Position	Union
James Blaney	Hooker	Ireland
Jerry Flannery	Hooker	Ireland
Andy Long	Hooker	England
Frankie Sheahan	Hooker	Ireland
John Hayes	Prop	Ireland
Marcus Horan	Prop	Ireland
Simon Kerr	Prop	Australia
Eugene McGovern	Prop	Ireland
Gordon McIlwham	Prop	Ireland
Frank Roche	Prop	Ireland
Tommy Hayes	Lock	Ireland
Trevor Hogan	Lock	Ireland
Donncha O'Callaghan	Lock	Ireland
Paul O'Connell	Lock	Ireland
Shane O'Connor	Lock	Ireland
Donal Sheehan	Lock	Ireland
Anthony Foley	Back row	Ireland
Stephen Keogh	Back row	Ireland
Denis Leamy	Back row	Ireland
Colm McMahon	Back row	Ireland
David Pusey	Back row	Australia
Alan Quinlan	Back row	Ireland
David Wallace	Back row	Ireland
Jim Williams (c)	Back row	Australia

Player	Position	Union
Frank Murphy	Scrum-half	Ireland
Mike Prendergast	Scrum-half	Ireland
Eoin Reddan	Scrum-half	Ireland
Peter Stringer	Scrum-half	Ireland
Ronan O'Gara	Fly-half	Ireland
Jeremy Staunton	Fly-half	Ireland
Clem Casey	Centre	Ireland
Rob Henderson	Centre	Ireland
Jason Holland	Centre	Ireland
Jason Jones-Hughes	Centre	Wales
Killian Keane	Centre	Ireland
Mike Mullins	Centre	Ireland
Conrad O'Sullivan	Centre	Ireland
Anthony Horgan	Wing	Ireland
John Kelly	Wing	Ireland
Mossy Lawler	Wing	Ireland
Martin McPhail	Wing	Ireland
Dominic Crotty	Fullback	Ireland
Christian Cullen	Fullback	New Zealand
Shaun Payne	Fullback	South Africa

== Pre-season ==
22 August 2003

Munster (Ireland)	38–19	(England) Rotherham
	Report

Thomond Park

29 August 2003

Connacht (Ireland)	12–38	(Ireland) Munster
	Report

Galway Sportsgrounds

== 2003–04 Celtic League ==
	Team	Pld	W	D	L	PF	PA	PD	TF	TA	Try bonus	Losing bonus	Pts
1	(Wales) Llanelli Scarlets	22	16	1	5	597	385	+212	57	39	7	3	76
2	(Ireland) Ulster	22	15	0	7	617	363	+254	67	29	8	4	72
3	(Wales) Newport Gwent Dragons	22	16	0	6	590	449	+141	59	41	7	1	72
4	(Wales) Celtic Warriors	22	14	0	8	560	451	+109	48	37	5	4	65
5	(Wales) Neath-Swansea Ospreys	22	11	1	10	582	512	+70	55	60	5	4	55
6	(Wales) Cardiff Blues	22	11	0	11	570	467	+103	73	54	7	3	54
7	(Ireland) Munster	22	10	0	12	422	456	−34	45	49	6	5	51
8	(Ireland) Leinster	22	9	1	12	523	580	−57	51	65	4	5	47
9	(Ireland) Connacht	22	8	2	12	479	550	−71	50	59	5	3	44
10	(Scotland) Edinburgh	22	9	0	13	454	622	−168	52	69	6	2	44
11	(Scotland) Glasgow	22	6	1	15	442	614	−172	52	61	3	3	32
12	(Scotland) Borders	22	4	0	18	363	750	−387	42	88	1	5	22
Under the standard bonus point system, points are awarded as follows: 4 points for a win; 2 points for a draw; 1 bonus point for scoring 4 tries (or more) (Try bonus); 1 bonus point for losing by 7 points (or fewer) (Losing bonus)
Source: RaboDirect PRO12

5 September 2003
19:35

Leinster (Ireland)	8–15	(Ireland) Munster
	Report

Donnybrook
Attendance: 6,000
Referee: Paul Adams

12 September 2003
19:30

Munster (Ireland)	12–19	(Wales) Llanelli Scarlets
	Report

Thomond Park
Attendance: 5,500

27 September 2003
17:30

Neath-Swansea Ospreys (Wales)	33–26	(Ireland) Munster
	Report

St. Helen's
Attendance: 5,200

10 October 2003
19:30

Munster (Ireland)	15–16	(Ireland) Ulster
	Report

Musgrave Park
Attendance: 4,000

17 October 2003
19:05

Newport Gwent Dragons (Wales)	29–6	(Ireland) Munster
	Report

Rodney Parade
Attendance: 3,571

24 October 2003
19:30

Munster (Ireland)	26–10	(Scotland) Glasgow
	Report

Musgrave Park
Attendance: 2,000

31 October 2003
19:30

Munster (Ireland)	22–21	(Wales) Celtic Warriors
	Report

Thomond Park
Attendance: 3,500

7 November 2003
19:30

Edinburgh (Scotland)	20–9	(Ireland) Munster
	Report

Meadowbank
Attendance: 2,300

28 November 2003
19:35

Munster (Ireland)	31–10	(Wales) Cardiff Blues
	Report

Musgrave Park
Attendance: 5,500
Referee: Iain Ramage

2 January 2004
19:00

Connacht (Ireland)	0–3	(Ireland) Munster
	Report

Dubarry Park
Attendance: 3,500

6 February 2004
19:30

Munster (Ireland)	29–21	(Scotland) Borders
	Report

Musgrave Park
Attendance: 3,800

13 February 2004
19:35

Munster (Ireland)	24–13	(Ireland) Leinster
	Report

Musgrave Park
Attendance: 5,400
Referee: Hugh Watkins

20 February 2004
19:30

Llanelli Scarlets (Wales)	37–20	(Ireland) Munster
	Report

Stradey Park
Attendance: 6,169

27 February 2004
19:35

Munster (Ireland)	15–18	(Wales) Neath-Swansea Ospreys
	Report

Musgrave Park
Attendance: 8,000

5 March 2004
19:35

Ulster (Ireland)	36–13	(Ireland) Munster
	Report

Ravenhill
Attendance: 8,820

12 March 2004
19:30

Munster (Ireland)	6–16	(Wales) Newport Gwent Dragons
	Report

Thomond Park
Attendance: 4,470

26 March 2004
19:55

Glasgow (Scotland)	12–37	(Ireland) Munster
	Report

Hughenden
Attendance: 2,645

2 April 2004
19:05

Celtic Warriors (Wales)	29–25	(Ireland) Munster
	Report

Sardis Road
Attendance: 4,157

16 April 2004
19:30

Munster (Ireland)	17–28	(Scotland) Edinburgh
	Report

Musgrave Park
Attendance: 4,935

30 April 2004
19:05

Cardiff Blues (Wales)	60–14	(Ireland) Munster
	Report

Cardiff Arms Park
Attendance: 4,110
Referee: Iain Ramage

7 May 2004
19:35

Munster (Ireland)	39–10	(Ireland) Connacht
	Report

Thomond Park
Attendance: 3,233

14 May 2004
19:30

Borders (Scotland)	10–18	(Ireland) Munster
	Report

Netherdale
Attendance: 2,000

== 2003–04 Celtic Cup ==
=== Quarter-final ===
3 October 2003
19:30

Glasgow (Scotland)	18–14	(Ireland) Munster
	Report

Hughenden
Attendance: 2,942

== 2003–04 Heineken Cup ==
=== Pool 5 ===
Team	P	W	D	L	Tries for	Tries against	Try diff	Points for	Points against	Points diff	TB	LB	Pts
(Ireland) Munster	6	5	0	1	22	5	17	172	76	96	4	0	24
(England) Gloucester	6	5	0	1	22	11	11	197	100	97	4	0	24
(France) Bourgoin	6	1	0	5	13	22	−9	119	191	−72	2	1	7
(Italy) Benetton Treviso	6	1	0	5	13	32	−19	104	225	−121	1	0	5

6 December 2003
18:00

Bourgoin (France)	17–18	(Ireland) Munster
	Report

Stade Pierre Rajon
Attendance: 9,200
Referee: Nigel Whitehouse

13 December 2003
17:00

Munster (Ireland)	51–0	(Italy) Benetton Treviso
	Report

Thomond Park
Attendance: 13,000
Referee: Rob Dickson

10 January 2004
27:00

Gloucester (England)	22–11	(Ireland) Munster
	Report

Kingsholm
Attendance: 11,000
Referee: Nigel Williams

17 January 2004
17:00

Munster (Ireland)	36–8	(England) Gloucester
	Report

Thomond Park
Attendance: 12,000

24 January 2004
14:30

Benetton Treviso (Italy)	20–31	(Ireland) Munster
	Report

Stadio Comunale di Monigo
Attendance: 5,500
Referee: Joel Dume

31 January 2004
17:00

Munster (Ireland)	26–3	(France) Bourgoin
	Report

Thomond Park
Attendance: 12,000
Referee: Tony Spreadbury

=== Quarter-final ===
10 April 2004
17:00

Munster (Ireland)	37–32	(France) Stade Français
	Report

Thomond Park
Attendance: 13,100
Referee: Nigel Williams

=== Semi-final ===
25 April 2004
15:00

Munster (Ireland)	32–37	(England) London Wasps
	Report

Lansdowne Road
Attendance: 45,000
Referee: Nigel Williams
