= 2002–03 Munster Rugby season =

- Ground(s): Thomond Park (Capacity: 13,200); Musgrave Park (Capacity: 8,300)
- CEO: Garrett Fitzgerald
- Coach: Declan Kidney
- Captain: Jim Williams
- League: Celtic League
- 2002–03: 1st (Pool A), Champions

The 2002–03 Munster Rugby season was Munster's second season competing in the Celtic League, alongside which they also competed in the Heineken Cup. It was Declan Kidney's fifth and final season in his first spell as head coach of the province.

== 2002–03 squad ==
Note: Flags indicate national union under World Rugby eligibility rules. Players may hold more than one non-World Rugby nationality.

Player	Position	Union
James Blaney	Hooker	Ireland
John Fogarty	Hooker	Ireland
Frankie Sheahan	Hooker	Ireland
Martin Cahill	Prop	Ireland
John Hayes	Prop	Ireland
Marcus Horan	Prop	Ireland
Simon Kerr	Prop	Australia
Rob Laffan	Prop	Ireland
Warren O'Kelly	Prop	Ireland
Mick Galwey	Lock	Ireland
Trevor Hogan	Lock	Ireland
Donncha O'Callaghan	Lock	Ireland
Paul O'Connell	Lock	Ireland
Mick O'Driscoll	Lock	Ireland
Anthony Foley	Back row	Ireland
Eddie Halvey	Back row	Ireland
Denis Leamy	Back row	Ireland
Peter Malone	Back row	Ireland
Colm McMahon	Back row	Ireland
Alan Quinlan	Back row	Ireland
David Wallace	Back row	Ireland
Jim Williams (c)	Back row	Australia

Player	Position	Union
Dominic Malone	Scrum-half	England
Frank Murphy	Scrum-half	Ireland
Mike Prendergast	Scrum-half	Ireland
Peter Stringer	Scrum-half	Ireland
Ronan O'Gara	Fly-half	Ireland
Jeremy Staunton	Fly-half	Ireland
Rob Henderson	Centre	Ireland
Jason Holland	Centre	Ireland
Killian Keane	Centre	Ireland
Conor Mahony	Centre	Ireland
Mike Mullins	Centre	Ireland
Anthony Horgan	Wing	Ireland
Clinton Huppert	Wing	New Zealand
John Kelly	Wing	Ireland
Mossy Lawler	Wing	Ireland
John O'Neill	Wing	Ireland
Dominic Crotty	Fullback	Ireland
Christian Cullen	Fullback	New Zealand

== Friendlies ==
13 August 2002

Munster (Ireland)	31–10	(England) Bristol Shoguns
	Report

Thomond Park

23 August 2002

Connacht (Ireland)	40–33	(Ireland) Munster
	Report

Galway Sportsgrounds

19 March 2003

Munster (Ireland)	36–19	(Scotland) Borders
	Report

Thomond Park

4 April 2003

Munster (Ireland)	43–5	(Ireland) Connacht
	Report

Thomond Park

== 2002–03 Celtic League ==
=== Pool A Table ===
	Team	Pld	W	D	L	PF	PA	PD	TF	TA	Try bonus	Losing bonus	Pts
1	(Ireland) Munster	7	6	0	1	227	129	+98	25	12	4	0	28
2	(Scotland) Edinburgh	7	6	0	1	231	145	+86	24	13	2	1	27
3	(Ireland) Ulster	7	5	0	2	173	111	+62	15	9	1	1	22
4	(Wales) Neath	7	4	0	3	153	121	+32	15	12	1	1	18
5	(Wales) Llanelli	7	3	0	4	191	168	+23	23	16	3	2	17
6	(Wales) Swansea	7	3	0	4	177	212	−35	18	22	3	1	16
7	(Wales) Ebbw Vale	7	1	0	6	140	226	−86	16	27	1	0	5
8	(Wales) Caerphilly	7	0	0	7	144	324	−180	17	42	2	1	3
Under the standard bonus point system, points are awarded as follows: 4 points for a win; 2 points for a draw; 1 bonus point for scoring 4 tries (or more) (Try bonus); 1 bonus point for losing by 7 points (or fewer) (Losing bonus)
Green background (rows 1 to 4) qualify for the knock-out stage. Source: RaboDirect PRO12

31 August 2002
19:05

Llanelli (Wales)	13–20	(Ireland) Munster
	Report

Stradey Park

6 September 2002
19:35

Munster (Ireland)	48–23	(Wales) Ebbw Vale
	Report

Musgrave Park
Attendance: 3,500

13 September 2002
17:30

Edinburgh (Scotland)	21–28	(Ireland) Munster
	Report

Meadowbank
Attendance: 4,500

20 September 2002
19:35

Munster (Ireland)	38–27	(Wales) Swansea
	Report

Musgrave Park
Attendance: 8,000

27 September 2002
19:35

Ulster (Ireland)	26–17	(Ireland) Munster
Try: Doak (2); Con: Doak (2); Pen: Doak (2)	Report	Try: Lawler; Pen: Staunton (2); Drop: Staunton, Holland

Ravenhill
Attendance: 6,000
Referee: P. Adams

5 October 2002
17:30

Neath (Wales)	19–35	(Ireland) Munster
	Report

The Gnoll
Attendance: 4,000

25 October 2002
19:30

Munster (Ireland)	41–0	(Wales) Caerphilly
	Report

Thomond Park
Attendance: 2,532

=== Quarter-final ===
29 November 2002
19:35

Munster (Ireland)	33–3	(Ireland) Connacht
	Report

Musgrave Park
Attendance: 8,000

=== Semi-final ===
3 January 2003
19:35

Munster (Ireland)	42–10	(Ireland) Ulster
Try: Hayes, Quinlan, Kelly, Mullins, Galwey; Con: O'Gara (3), Keane; Pen: O'Gara (3)	Report	Try: Humphreys; Con: Humphreys; Pen: Humphreys

Thomond Park
Attendance: 12,000
Referee: H. Watkins

=== Final ===
1 February 2003
14:45

Munster (Ireland)	37–17	(Wales) Neath
	Report

Millennium Stadium
Attendance: 30,076
Referee: Chris White

== 2002–03 Heineken Cup ==
=== Pool 2 ===
Team	P	W	D	L	Tries for	Tries against	Try diff	Points for	Points against	Points diff	Pts
(France) Perpignan	6	4	0	2	23	16	7	176	156	20	8
(Ireland) Munster	6	4	0	2	27	14	13	206	107	99	8
(England) Gloucester	6	4	0	2	31	14	17	241	140	101	8
(Italy) Arix Viadana	6	0	0	6	15	52	−37	128	348	−220	0

12 October 2002
15:00

Gloucester (England)	35–16	(Ireland) Munster
	Report

Kingsholm
Attendance: 11,200
Referee: Joel Dume

19 October 2002
15:00

Munster (Ireland)	30–21	(France) Perpignan
	Report

Thomond Park
Attendance: 9,000

6 December 2002
27:00

Munster (Ireland)	64–0	(Italy) Viadana
	Report

Musgrave Park
Attendance: 6,500

14 December 2002
18:00

Viadana (Italy)	36–8	(Ireland) Munster
	Report

Stadio Luigi Zaffanella
Attendance: 2,000

11 January 2003
14:30

Perpignan (France)	23–8	(Ireland) Munster
	Report

Stade Aimé Giral
Attendance: 8,000

18 January 2003
14:45

Munster (Ireland)	33–6	(England) Gloucester
	Report

Thomond Park
Attendance: 14,000

=== Quarter-final ===
13 April 2003
16:00

Leicester Tigers (England)	7–20	(Ireland) Munster
	Report

Welford Road
Attendance: 17,500
Referee: Nigel Williams

=== Semi-final ===
26 April 2003
14:00

Toulouse (France)	13–12	(Ireland) Munster
	Report

Stadium de Toulouse
Attendance: 36,400
