= 1999–2000 Munster Rugby season =

- Ground(s): Thomond Park (Capacity: 13,200); Musgrave Park (Capacity: 8,300)
- CEO: Garrett Fitzgerald
- Coach: Declan Kidney
- Captain: Mick Galwey

The 1999–2000 Munster Rugby season was Munster's fifth season as a professional team, during which they competed in the IRFU Interprovincial Championship and Heineken Cup. It was Declan Kidney's second season in his first spell as head coach of the province.

== 1999–2000 squad ==
Note: Flags indicate national union under World Rugby eligibility rules. Players may hold more than one non-World Rugby nationality.

Player	Position	Union
Frankie Sheahan	Hooker	Ireland
Keith Wood	Hooker	Ireland
Peter Clohessy	Prop	Ireland
John Hayes	Prop	Ireland
Marcus Horan	Prop	Ireland
Ian Murray	Prop	Ireland
Mick Galwey (c)	Lock	Ireland
John Langford	Lock	Australia
Donncha O'Callaghan	Lock	Ireland
Mick O'Driscoll	Lock	Ireland
Anthony Foley	Back row	Ireland
Eddie Halvey	Back row	Ireland
Alan Quinlan	Back row	Ireland
David Wallace	Back row	Ireland

Player	Position	Union
Peter Stringer	Scrum-half	Ireland
Tom Tierney	Scrum-half	Ireland
Ronan O'Gara	Fly-half	Ireland
Jeremy Staunton	Fly-half	Ireland
Jason Holland	Centre	Ireland
Killian Keane	Centre	Ireland
Conor Mahony	Centre	Ireland
Mike Mullins	Centre	Ireland
Anthony Horgan	Wing	Ireland
John Kelly	Wing	Ireland
John O'Neill	Wing	Ireland
Dominic Crotty	Fullback	Ireland

== Friendlies ==
10 September 1999

Munster (Ireland)	26–19	Ireland XV
	Report

Musgrave Park
Referee: Alan Lewis

7 April 2000
19:45

Leicester Tigers (England)	25–17	(Ireland) Munster
	Report

Welford Road
Attendance: 3,308
Referee: Chuck Muir

== 1999–2000 IRFU Interprovincial Championship ==
1999–00 Munster (21)
Team	P	W	D	L	F	A	BP	Pts	Status
Munster	6	6	0	0	242	103	5	29	Champions; qualified for next season's Heineken Cup
Ulster	6	3	0	3	186	129	3	15	Qualified for next season's Heineken Cup
Leinster	6	2	0	4	145	137	2	10	Qualified for next season's Heineken Cup
Connacht	6	0	0	6	85	289	1	1	

7 August 1999

Munster (Ireland)	31–20	(Ireland) Leinster
	Report

Temple Hill

14 August 1999

Connacht (Ireland)	17–67	(Ireland) Munster
	Report

Galway Sportsgrounds

5 September 1999

Ulster (Ireland)	24–25	(Ireland) Munster
Try: Bromley, Fredericks; Con: Mason; Pen: Mason (3); Drop: Humphreys	Report	Try: Mullins (2), Corkery; Con: O'Gara (2); Pen: O'Gara (2)

Upper Malone

29 October 1999

Munster (Ireland)	36–19	(Ireland) Ulster
Try: O'Neill, Mullins; Con: O'Gara; Pen: O'Gara (8)	Report	Try: Topping; Con: Mason; Pen: Mason (4)

Musgrave Park

5 November 1999

Leinster (Ireland)	13–30	(Ireland) Munster
	Report

Donnybrook

12 November 1999

Munster (Ireland)	53–10	(Ireland) Connacht
	Report

Thomond Park

== 1999–2000 Heineken Cup ==
=== Pool 4 ===
Team	P	W	D	L	Tries for	Tries against	Try diff	Points for	Points against	Points diff	Pts
(Ireland) Munster	6	5	0	1	19	14	5	188	132	56	10
(England) Saracens	6	3	0	3	24	15	9	206	153	53	6
(France) Colomiers	6	2	0	4	13	20	−7	144	194	−50	4
(Wales) Pontypridd	6	2	0	4	13	20	−7	106	165	−59	4

20 November 1999
14:30

Munster (Ireland)	32–10	(Wales) Pontypridd
	Report

Thomond Park
Attendance: 6,500
Referee: Brian Campsall

28 November 1999
15:00

Saracens (England)	34–35	(Ireland) Munster
	Report

Vicarage Road
Attendance: 6,528
Referee: Jim Fleming

11 December 1999
15:00

Colomiers (France)	15–31	(Ireland) Munster
	Report

Stade Selery
Attendance: 4,000
Referee: Chris Rees

18 December 1999
14:30

Munster (Ireland)	23–5	(France) Colomiers
	Report

Musgrave Park
Attendance: 8,500
Referee: Antonio Lombardi

8 January 2000
15:30

Munster (Ireland)	31–30	(England) Saracens
	Report

Thomond Park
Attendance: 14,000
Referee: Chris White

15 January 2000
14:30

Pontypridd (Wales)	38–36	(Ireland) Munster
	Report

Sardis Road
Attendance: 5,000
Referee: Claudio Giacomel

=== Quarter-final ===
15 April 2000
13:15

Munster (Ireland)	27–10	(France) Stade Français
	Report

Thomond Park
Attendance: 14,000
Referee: Steve Lander

=== Semi-final ===
6 May 2000
15:45

Toulouse (France)	25–31	(Ireland) Munster
	Report

Stade Chaban-Delmas
Attendance: 28,000
Referee: Jim Fleming

=== Final ===
27 May 2000
15:00

Munster (Ireland)	8–9	(England) Northampton Saints
	Report

Twickenham
Attendance: 66,441
Referee: Joël Dumé
