= 2004–05 Munster Rugby season =

- Ground(s): Thomond Park (Capacity: 13,200); Musgrave Park (Capacity: 8,300)
- CEO: Garrett Fitzgerald
- Coach: Alan Gaffney
- Captain: Jim Williams
- League: Celtic League
- 2004–05: 2nd

The 2004–05 Munster Rugby season was Munster's fourth season competing in the Celtic League, alongside which they also competed in the Heineken Cup. It was Alan Gaffney's second and final season as head coach.

== 2004–05 squad ==
Note: Flags indicate national union under World Rugby eligibility rules. Players may hold more than one non-World Rugby nationality.

Player	Position	Union
James Blaney	Hooker	Ireland
Denis Fogarty	Hooker	Ireland
Jerry Flannery	Hooker	Ireland
Frankie Sheahan	Hooker	Ireland
Ross Callaghan	Prop	Ireland
John Hayes	Prop	Ireland
Marcus Horan	Prop	Ireland
Eugene McGovern	Prop	Ireland
Gordon McIlwham	Prop	Ireland
Frank Roche	Prop	Ireland
Tom Bowman	Lock	Australia
Tommy Hayes	Lock	Ireland
Trevor Hogan	Lock	Ireland
Donncha O'Callaghan	Lock	Ireland
Paul O'Connell	Lock	Ireland
Anthony Foley	Back row	Ireland
Stephen Keogh	Back row	Ireland
Denis Leamy	Back row	Ireland
Johnny O'Connor	Back row	Ireland
David Pusey	Back row	Australia
Alan Quinlan	Back row	Ireland
David Wallace	Back row	Ireland
Jim Williams (c)	Back row	Australia

Player	Position	Union
Frank Murphy	Scrum-half	Ireland
Mike Prendergast	Scrum-half	Ireland
Eoin Reddan	Scrum-half	Ireland
Peter Stringer	Scrum-half	Ireland
Paul Burke	Fly-half	Ireland
Jeremy Manning	Fly-half	Ireland
Ronan O'Gara	Fly-half	Ireland
Paul Devlin	Centre	Ireland
Rob Henderson	Centre	Ireland
Jason Holland	Centre	Ireland
Keith Matthews	Centre	Ireland
Mike Mullins	Centre	Ireland
Barry Murphy	Centre	Ireland
Anthony Horgan	Wing	Ireland
John Kelly	Wing	Ireland
Mossy Lawler	Wing	Ireland
Martin McPhail	Wing	Ireland
James Storey	Wing	Ireland
Brian Tuohy	Wing	Ireland
Christian Cullen	Fullback	New Zealand
Shaun Payne*	Fullback	South Africa

== Pre-season ==
17 August 2004

Munster (Ireland)	5–12	(England) London Irish
	Report

Thomond Park
Attendance: 5,000

23 August 2004

Munster (Ireland)	11–10	(England) Newcastle Falcons
	Report

Thomond Park

== 2004–05 Celtic League ==
	Team	Pld	W	D	L	PF	PA	PD	TF	TA	Try bonus	Losing bonus	Pts
1	(Wales) Neath-Swansea Ospreys	20	16	1	3	508	267	+241	53	27	7	3	76
2	(Ireland) Munster	20	15	1	4	470	331	+139	54	33	6	1	69
3	(Ireland) Leinster	20	12	1	7	455	350	+105	46	32	4	3	57
4	(Wales) Newport Gwent Dragons	20	11	0	9	381	436	−55	39	43	4	2	50
5	(Wales) Llanelli Scarlets	20	9	0	11	402	446	−44	48	42	7	3	46
6	(Scotland) Glasgow Warriors	20	8	1	11	465	466	−1	40	58	4	7	45
7	(Scotland) Edinburgh	20	9	0	11	409	407	+2	47	40	4	4	44
8	(Ireland) Ulster	20	9	0	11	363	387	−24	37	34	2	5	43
9	(Wales) Cardiff Blues	20	8	1	11	350	404	−54	35	41	2	4	40
10	(Ireland) Connacht	20	7	1	12	317	407	−90	32	46	2	5	37
11	(Scotland) Borders	20	3	0	17	337	556	−219	31	66	2	4	18
Under the standard bonus point system, points are awarded as follows: 4 points for a win; 2 points for a draw; 1 bonus point for scoring 4 tries (or more) (Try bonus); 1 bonus point for losing by 7 points (or fewer) (Losing bonus)
Source: RaboDirect PRO12

3 September 2004
19:05

Neath-Swansea Ospreys (Wales)	34–17	(Ireland) Munster
	Report

St. Helen's
Attendance: 4,052

11 September 2004
20:05

Munster (Ireland)	27–27	(Ireland) Connacht
	Report

Musgrave Park
Attendance: 4,200

18 September 2004
17:15

Leinster (Ireland)	17–15	(Ireland) Munster
	Report

Donnybrook
Attendance: 6,500
Referee: Hugh Watkins

3 October 2004
17:15

Munster (Ireland)	19–13	(Wales) Llanelli Scarlets
	Report

Thomond Park
Attendance: 9,000

9 October 2004
19:30

Glasgow (Scotland)	26–28	(Ireland) Munster
	Report

Hughenden
Attendance: 2,625

16 October 2004
17:15

Munster (Ireland)	49–18	(Wales) Cardiff Blues
	Report

Thomond Park
Attendance: 7,500
Referee: David Changleng

6 November 2004

Ulster (Ireland)	3–24	(Ireland) Munster
	Report

Ravenhill
Attendance: 6,402

13 November 2004
20:05

Munster (Ireland)	25–16	(Wales) Newport Gwent Dragons
	Report

Musgrave Park
Attendance: 3,850

19 November 2004
18:45

Munster (Ireland)	45–8	(Scotland) The Borders
	Report

Musgrave Park
Attendance: 4,250

26 November 2004
19:30

Edinburgh (Scotland)	0–11	(Ireland) Munster
	Report

Murrayfield
Attendance: 2,496

18 December 2004
20:05

Munster (Ireland)	13–9	(Wales) Neath-Swansea Ospreys
	Report

Musgrave Park
Attendance: 3,500

27 December 2004
19:35

Connacht (Ireland)	0–3	(Ireland) Munster
	Report

Galway Sportsgrounds
Attendance: 4,500

1 January 2005
17:30

Munster (Ireland)	19–13	(Ireland) Leinster
	Report

Musgrave Park
Attendance: 8,000
Referee: Alan Lewis

29 January 2005
17:30

Llanelli Scarlets (Wales)	32–17	(Ireland) Munster
	Report

Stradey Park
Attendance: 7,530
Referee: Andy Ireland

20 February 2005
17:00

Munster (Ireland)	25–19	(Scotland) Glasgow
	Report

Thomond Park
Attendance: 5,000
Referee: Jonathan Kaplan

5 March 2005
19:30

Cardiff Blues (Wales)	30–20	(Ireland) Munster
	Report

Cardiff Arms Park
Attendance: 3,350
Referee: Mike Hall

18 March 2005
19:00

Munster (Ireland)	21–15	(Ireland) Ulster
	Report

Musgrave Park
Attendance: 5,870
Referee: Andy Ireland

25 March 2005
19:05

Newport Gwent Dragons (Wales)	8–24	(Ireland) Munster
	Report

Rodney Parade
Attendance: 5,902
Referee: Rob Dickson

10 April 2005
16:45

Borders (Scotland)	23–38	(Ireland) Munster
	Report

Netherdale
Attendance: 1,646
Referee: Phil Fear

16 April 2005
19:30

Munster (Ireland)	30–20	(Scotland) Edinburgh
	Report

Thomond Park
Attendance: 5,000
Referee: Nigel Williams

== 2004–05 Celtic Cup ==
=== Quarter-final ===
30 April 2005
19:30

Munster (Ireland)	24–14	(Scotland) Edinburgh
	Report

Thomond Park
Attendance: 6,000
Referee: Nigel Owens

=== Semi-final ===
8 May 2005
17:30

Leinster (Ireland)	17–23	(Ireland) Munster
	Report

Lansdowne Road
Attendance: 13,500
Referee: Nigel Whitehouse

=== Final ===
14 May 2005
17:30

Munster (Ireland)	27–16	(Wales) Llanelli Scarlets
	Report

Lansdowne Road
Attendance: 11,500
Referee: Joël Jutge

== 2004–05 Heineken Cup ==
=== Pool 4 ===
Team	P	W	D	L	Tries for	Tries against	Try diff	Points for	Points against	Points diff	TB	LB	Pts
(Ireland) Munster (5)	6	5	0	1	12	4	8	121	74	47	1	1	22
(France) Castres	6	3	1	2	16	13	3	157	121	36	2	0	16
(Wales) Neath-Swansea Ospreys	6	3	0	3	11	10	1	135	115	20	1	1	14
(England) NEC Harlequins	6	0	1	5	7	19	−12	81	184	−103	0	1	3

23 October 2004
17:15

Munster (Ireland)	15–9	(England) NEC Harlequins
	Report

Thomond Park
Attendance: 13,485
Referee: Hugh Watkins

31 October 2004
15:00

Neath-Swansea Ospreys (Wales)	18–20	(Ireland) Munster
	Report

The Gnoll
Attendance: 10,280
Referee: Joël Jutge

3 December 2004
20:30

Castres (France)	19–12	(Ireland) Munster
	Report

Stade Pierre-Antoine
Attendance: 9,500
Referee: Nigel Whitehouse

11 December 2004
17:15

Munster (Ireland)	36–8	(France) Castres
	Report

Thomond Park
Attendance: 13,200
Referee: Roy Maybank

8 January 2005
17:15

Munster (Ireland)	20–10	(Wales) Neath-Swansea Ospreys
	Report

Thomond Park
Attendance: 13,200
Referee: Chris White

15 January 2005
13:00

NEC Harlequins (England)	10–18	(Ireland) Munster
	Report

Twickenham
Attendance: 33,383
Referee: Joël Jutge

=== Quarter-final ===
3 April 2005
16:00

Biarritz (France)	19–10	(Ireland) Munster
	Report

Anoeta Stadium
Attendance: 32,000
Referee: Chris White
