= 1998–99 Munster Rugby season =

- Ground(s): Thomond Park (Capacity: 13,200); Musgrave Park (Capacity: 8,300)
- Coach: Declan Kidney
- Captain: Mick Galwey

The 1998–99 Munster Rugby season was Munster's fourth season as a professional team, during which they competed in the IRFU Interprovincial Championship and Heineken Cup. It was Declan Kidney's first season in his first spell as head coach of the province.

== 1998–99 squad ==
Note: Flags indicate national union under World Rugby eligibility rules. Players may hold more than one non-World Rugby nationality.

Player	Position	Union
Mark McDermott	Hooker	Ireland
Frankie Sheahan	Hooker	Ireland
Des Clohessy	Prop	Ireland
Peter Clohessy	Prop	Ireland
John Hayes	Prop	Ireland
Ian Murray	Prop	Ireland
Mick Galwey (c)	Lock	Ireland
Shane Leahy	Lock	Ireland
Donncha O'Callaghan	Lock	Ireland
Mick O'Driscoll	Lock	Ireland
David Corkery	Back row	Ireland
Anthony Foley	Back row	Ireland
Eddie Halvey	Back row	Ireland
Jerry Murray	Back row	Ireland
Alan Quinlan	Back row	Ireland
David Wallace	Back row	Ireland

Player	Position	Union
Peter Stringer	Scrum-half	Ireland
Tom Tierney	Scrum-half	Ireland
Barry Everitt	Fly-half	Ireland
Ronan O'Gara	Fly-half	Ireland
Killian Keane	Centre	Ireland
Cian Mahony	Centre	Ireland
Conor Mahony	Centre	Ireland
Mike Lynch	Centre	Ireland
Mike Mullins	Centre	Ireland
Rhys Ellison	Wing	New Zealand
Anthony Horgan	Wing	Ireland
John Kelly	Wing	Ireland
John O'Neill	Wing	Ireland
Brian Roche	Wing	Ireland
Dominic Crotty	Fullback	Ireland

== Friendlies ==
18 August 1998

Munster (Ireland)	49–17	Morocco
	Report

Thomond Park

== 1998–99 IRFU Interprovincial Championship ==
Team	P	W	D	L	F	A	BP	Pts	Status
Munster	6	4	0	2	125	92	2	18	Champions; qualified for next season's Heineken Cup
Ulster	6	3	0	3	137	119	3	15	Qualified for next season's Heineken Cup
Leinster	6	3	0	3	135	136	2	14	Qualified for next season's Heineken Cup
Connacht	6	2	0	4	95	145	3	11	

15 August 1998

Connacht (Ireland)	13–18	(Ireland) Munster
	Report

Galway Sportsgrounds

21 August 1998

Munster (Ireland)	18–24	(Ireland) Leinster
	Report

Dooradoyle

4 September 1998

Ulster (Ireland)	29–12	(Ireland) Munster
Try: J. Cunningham, Rea; Con: Mason (2); Pen: Mason (5)	Report	Pen: Keane (4)

Ravenhill

12 September 1998

Munster (Ireland)	21–7	(Ireland) Connacht
	Report

Dooradoyle

3 October 1998

Munster (Ireland)	31–9	(Ireland) Ulster
Try: Lacey, Horgan, Foley, Galwey; Con: Lynch; Pen: Lynch (3)	Report	Pen: Mason (2); Drop: Humphreys

Musgrave Park

23 October 1998

Leinster (Ireland)	10–25	(Ireland) Munster
	Report

Donnybrook

== 1998–99 Heineken Cup ==
=== Pool 2 ===
Team	P	W	D	L	Tries for	Tries against	Try diff	Points for	Points against	Points diff	Pts
(France) Perpignan	6	5	0	1	35	13	22	238	108	130	10
(Ireland) Munster	6	4	1	1	17	13	4	144	108	36	9
(Wales) Neath	6	1	1	4	14	27	−13	118	194	−76	3
(Italy) Safilo Petraca Rugby Padova	6	1	0	5	8	21	−13	79	169	−90	2

19 September 1998
14:30

Munster (Ireland)	20–13	(Italy) Petrarca
	Report

Musgrave Park
Attendance: 2,000
Referee: David Davies

26 September 1998
15:00

Munster (Ireland)	34–10	(Wales) Neath
	Report

Musgrave Park
Attendance: 1,500
Referee: Joël Jutge

10 October 1998
15:15

Perpignan (France)	41–24	(Ireland) Munster
	Report

Stade Gilbert Brutus
Attendance: 5,000
Referee: Robert Davies

17 October 1998
14:30

Neath (Wales)	18–18	(Ireland) Munster
	Report

The Gnoll
Attendance: 1,200
Referee: Chuck Muir

31 October 1998
14:30

Munster (Ireland)	13–5	(France) Perpignan
	Report

Musgrave Park
Attendance: 4,000
Referee: Steve Lander

8 November 1998
16:00

Petrarca (Italy)	21–35	(Ireland) Munster
	Report

Stadio Plebiscito
Attendance: 500
Referee: Didier Mene

=== Quarter-final ===
13 December 1998
15:00

Colomiers (France)	23–9	(Ireland) Munster
	Report

Stade Selery
Attendance: 8,000
Referee: Nigel Whitehouse
