= 2002–03 Celtic League =

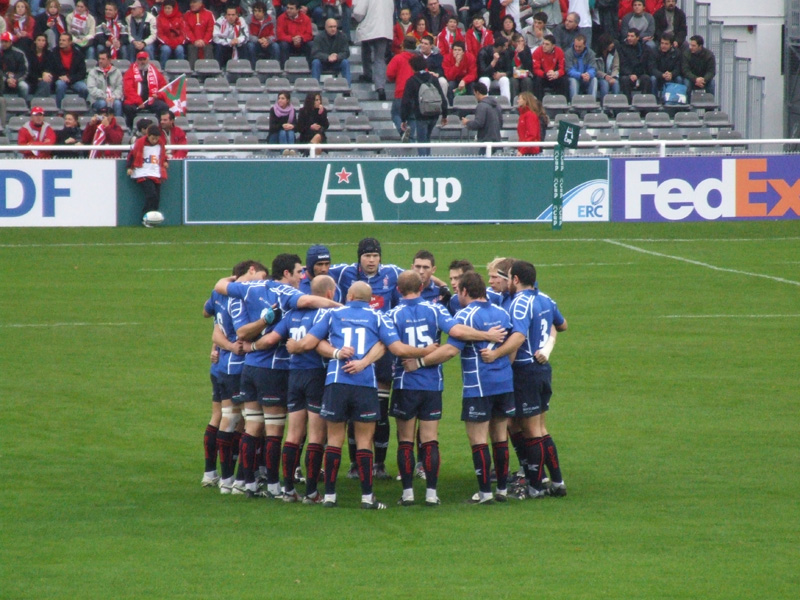
- Countries: Ireland; Scotland; Wales
- Champions: (Ireland) Munster (1st title)
- Runners-up: (Wales) Neath
- Matches played: 63
- Attendance: 308,374 (average 4,895 per match)
- Tries scored: 302 (average 4.8 per match)
- Top point scorer: Brendan Laney (Edinburgh); 137 points
- Top try scorer: Mossie Lawlor (Munster); Craig Morgan (Cardiff); Mike Mullins (Munster); 6 tries

Official website
- www.rabodirectpro12.com

The 2002–03 Celtic League was the second season of the Celtic League, a rugby union tournament involving teams from Ireland, Scotland and Wales.

== Teams ==
Location of 2002–03 Celtic League teams in Scotland and Ireland.	Location of 2002–03 Celtic League teams in Wales.
Pool A; Pool B.

Team	Stadium	Capacity	City, Area
(Scotland) Borders	Netherdale (Note: Borders also played matches at Philiphaugh Stadium, Selkirk and Mansfield Park, Hawick.)	6,000	Galashiels, Scotland
(Wales) Bridgend	Brewery Field	6,000	Bridgend, Wales
(Wales) Caerphilly	Virginia Park	5,000	Caerphilly, Wales
(Wales) Cardiff	Cardiff Arms Park	12,500	Cardiff, Wales
(Ireland) Connacht	Galway Sportsgrounds	6,000	Galway, Republic of Ireland
(Wales) Ebbw Vale	Eugene Cross Park	8,000	Ebbw Vale, Wales
(Scotland) Edinburgh	Meadowbank Stadium	16,500	Edinburgh, Scotland
(Scotland) Glasgow	Hughenden Stadium	6,000	Glasgow, Scotland
(Ireland) Leinster	Donnybrook Stadium	6,000	Dublin, Republic of Ireland
(Wales) Llanelli	Stradey Park	10,800	Llanelli, Wales
(Ireland) Munster	Thomond Park; Musgrave Park	13,200; 8,500	Limerick, Republic of Ireland; Cork, Republic of Ireland
(Wales) Neath	The Gnoll	6,000	Neath, Wales
(Wales) Newport	Rodney Parade	11,676	Newport, Wales
(Wales) Pontypridd	Sardis Road	7,861	Pontypridd, Wales
(Wales) Swansea	St Helen's	4,500	Swansea, Wales
(Ireland) Ulster	Ravenhill	12,300	Belfast, Northern Ireland

== Pool stage ==
The teams were split into two pools and the pool stage consisted of a single round-robin; each team played the others in its pool once only.

=== Pool A Table ===
	Team	Pld	W	D	L	PF	PA	PD	TF	TA	Try bonus	Losing bonus	Pts
1	(Ireland) Munster	7	6	0	1	227	129	+98	25	12	4	0	28
2	(Scotland) Edinburgh	7	6	0	1	231	145	+86	24	13	2	1	27
3	(Ireland) Ulster	7	5	0	2	173	111	+62	15	9	1	1	22
4	(Wales) Neath	7	4	0	3	153	121	+32	15	12	1	1	18
5	(Wales) Llanelli	7	3	0	4	191	168	+23	23	16	3	2	17
6	(Wales) Swansea	7	3	0	4	177	212	−35	18	22	3	1	16
7	(Wales) Ebbw Vale	7	1	0	6	140	226	−86	16	27	1	0	5
8	(Wales) Caerphilly	7	0	0	7	144	324	−180	17	42	2	1	3
Under the standard bonus point system, points are awarded as follows: 4 points for a win; 2 points for a draw; 1 bonus point for scoring 4 tries (or more) (Try bonus); 1 bonus point for losing by 7 points (or fewer) (Losing bonus)
Green background (rows 1 to 4) qualify for the knock-out stage. Source: RaboDirect PRO12

=== Pool A Fixtures ===
30 August 2002
19:00

Neath (Wales)	25–6	(Wales) Caerphilly
	Report

The Gnoll
Attendance: 3,000

30 August 2002
19:15

Ebbw Vale (Wales)	0–19	(Ireland) Ulster
	Report	Try: Wallace; Con: Humphreys; Pen: Humphreys (4)

Eugene Cross Park
Referee: Dave Pearson

30 August 2002
19:30

Edinburgh (Scotland)	30–20	(Wales) Swansea
	Report

Meadowbank
Attendance: 3,141

31 August 2002
19:05

Llanelli (Wales)	13–20	(Ireland) Munster
	Report

Stradey Park

6 September 2002
19:05

Swansea (Wales)	16–20	(Wales) Neath
	Report

St Helen's
Attendance: 4,000

6 September 2002
19:30

Ulster (Ireland)	18–19	(Scotland) Edinburgh
Pen: Wallace (6)	Report	Try: Laney; Con: Laney; Pen: Laney (3); Drop: Hodge

Ravenhill
Attendance: 7,500

6 September 2002
19:35

Munster (Ireland)	48–23	(Wales) Ebbw Vale
	Report

Musgrave Park
Attendance: 3,500

7 September 2002
14:30

Caerphilly (Wales)	34–43	(Wales) Llanelli
	Report

Virginia Park
Attendance: 1,300

13 September 2002
19:30

Edinburgh (Scotland)	21–28	(Ireland) Munster
	Report

Meadowbank
Attendance: 4,500

14 September 2002
14:30

Ebbw Vale (Wales)	45–25	(Wales) Caerphilly
	Report

Eugene Cross Park
Attendance: 1,000

14 September 2002
14:30

Swansea (Wales)	38–10	(Ireland) Ulster
Try: K. Morgan; Robinson; Gibbs; Payne; Con: A. Thomas (3); Pen: A. Thomas (4)	Report	Try: Howe; Con: Humphreys; Pen: Humphreys

St Helen's
Attendance: 2,500

14 September 2002
17:30

Neath (Wales)	29–13	(Wales) Llanelli
	Report

The Gnoll
Attendance: 6,000

20 September 2002
19:30

Ulster (Ireland)	17–13	(Wales) Neath
Try: B. Cunningham; Howe; Con: Doak (2); Pen: Doak	Report	Try: S. Williams; Con: Jarvis; Pen: Jarvis (2)

Ravenhill
Attendance: 9,500

20 September 2002
19:35

Munster (Ireland)	38–27	(Wales) Swansea
	Report

Musgrave Park
Attendance: 8,000

21 September 2002
14:30

Caerphilly (Wales)	32–66	(Scotland) Edinburgh
	Report

Virginia Park
Attendance: 800

21 September 2002
14:30

Llanelli (Wales)	37–25	(Wales) Ebbw Vale
	Report

Stradey Park
Attendance: 3,000

27 September 2002
19:05

Neath (Wales)	34–7	(Wales) Ebbw Vale
	Report

The Gnoll
Attendance: 3,500

27 September 2002
19:30

Edinburgh (Scotland)	38–14	(Wales) Llanelli
	Report

Meadowbank
Attendance: 3,890

27 September 2002
19:35

Ulster (Ireland)	26–17	(Ireland) Munster
Try: Doak (2); Con: Doak (2); Pen: Doak (2)	Report	Try: Lawler; Pen: Staunton (2); Drop: Staunton; Holland

Ravenhill
Attendance: 6,000
Referee: P. Adams

28 September 2002
14:30

Swansea (Wales)	37–32	(Wales) Caerphilly
	Report

St Helen's
Attendance: 2,500

4 October 2002
19:05

Llanelli (Wales)	62–6	(Wales) Swansea
	Report

Stradey Park
Attendance: 6,883
Referee: David McHugh (Ireland)

5 October 2002
14:30

Caerphilly (Wales)	15–67	(Ireland) Ulster
Try: Chiltern (2); Con: McLaughlin; Pen: McLaughlin	Report	Try: Neil Best (2); Howe; Brosnihan; McWhirter; Stewart; Bell; Sexton; Con: Humphreys (6); Pen: Humphreys (5)

Virginia Park
Attendance: 750

5 October 2002
14:30

Ebbw Vale (Wales)	20–30	(Scotland) Edinburgh
	Report

Eugene Cross Park

5 October 2002
17:30

Neath (Wales)	19–35	(Ireland) Munster
	Report

The Gnoll
Attendance: 4,000

25 October 2002
19:30

Edinburgh (Scotland)	27–13	(Wales) Neath
	Report

Meadowbank
Attendance: 3,171

25 October 2002
19:30

Munster (Ireland)	41–0	(Wales) Caerphilly
	Report

Thomond Park
Attendance: 2,532

25 October 2002
19:35

Ulster (Ireland)	16–9	(Wales) Llanelli
Try: Doak; Con: Humphreys; Pen: Humphreys; Drop: Humphreys	Report	Pen: Jones (3)

Ravenhill
Attendance: 10,500
Referee: John Hogg

26 October 2002
14:30

Swansea (Wales)	33–20	(Wales) Ebbw Vale
	Report

St Helen's
Attendance: 2,000

=== Pool B Table ===
	Team	Pld	W	D	L	PF	PA	PD	TF	TA	Try bonus	Losing bonus	Pts
1	(Wales) Pontypridd	7	6	0	1	182	120	+62	15	12	2	0	26
2	(Scotland) Glasgow	7	5	0	2	216	166	+50	22	20	2	1	23
3	(Wales) Cardiff	7	4	0	3	178	151	+27	17	12	2	2	20
4	(Ireland) Connacht	7	5	0	2	126	176	−50	11	17	0	0	20
5	(Ireland) Leinster	7	3	0	4	191	154	+37	22	14	3	3	18
6	(Scotland) Borders	7	2	0	5	142	169	−27	15	11	1	3	12
7	(Wales) Bridgend	7	2	0	5	127	187	−60	11	20	1	1	10
8	(Wales) Newport	7	1	0	6	121	160	−39	9	16	0	4	8
Under the standard bonus point system, points are awarded as follows: 4 points for a win; 2 points for a draw; 1 bonus point for scoring 4 tries (or more) (Try bonus); 1 bonus point for losing by 7 points (or fewer) (Losing bonus)
Green background (rows 1 to 4) qualify for the knock-out stage. Source: RaboDirect PRO12

=== Pool B Fixtures ===
30 August 2002
19:05

Newport (Wales)	5–13	(Wales) Bridgend
	Report

Rodney Parade
Attendance: 6,165

30 August 2002
19:30

Borders (Scotland)	27–28	(Ireland) Connacht
	Report

Philiphaugh
Attendance: 3,000

30 August 2002
19:35

Leinster (Ireland)	31–18	(Wales) Pontypridd
	Report

Donnybrook
Attendance: 4,500

31 August 2002
14:30

Cardiff (Wales)	35–44	(Scotland) Glasgow
	Report

Cardiff Arms Park
Attendance: 7,000

6 September 2002
18:00

Connacht (Ireland)	23–22	(Wales) Cardiff
	Report

Sportsground
Attendance: 2,500

6 September 2002
19:30

Glasgow (Scotland)	25–21	(Ireland) Leinster
	Report

Hughenden
Attendance: 4,250

7 September 2002
14:30

Bridgend (Wales)	41–9	(Scotland) Borders
	Report

Brewery Field
Attendance: 3,000

7 September 2002
19:05

Pontypridd (Wales)	21–16	(Wales) Newport
	Report

Sardis Road
Attendance: 5,800

13 September 2002
19:05

Bridgend (Wales)	9–26	(Wales) Pontypridd
	Report

Brewery Field
Attendance: 4,500

13 September 2002
19:30

Borders (Scotland)	15–18	(Wales) Cardiff
	Report

Mansfield Park
Attendance: 4,213

13 September 2002
19:35

Leinster (Ireland)	23–26	(Ireland) Connacht
	Report

Donnybrook
Attendance: 6,000

14 September 2002
14:30

Newport (Wales)	25–31	(Scotland) Glasgow
	Report

Rodney Parade
Attendance: 4,500

20 September 2002
17:45

Connacht (Ireland)	18–12	(Wales) Newport
	Report

Sportsground
Attendance: 3,000

20 September 2002
19:05

Pontypridd (Wales)	28–27	(Scotland) Borders
	Report

Sardis Road
Attendance: 4,600

20 September 2002
19:30

Glasgow (Scotland)	47–11	(Wales) Bridgend
	Report

Hughenden
Attendance: 4,500

21 September 2002
17:30

Cardiff (Wales)	30–17	(Ireland) Leinster
	Report

Cardiff Arms Park
Attendance: 6,500

27 September 2002
19:30

Borders (Scotland)	23–18	(Ireland) Leinster
	Report

Netherdale
Attendance: 4,000

28 September 2002
14:30

Bridgend (Wales)	23–24	(Ireland) Connacht
	Report

Brewery Field
Attendance: 2,000

28 September 2002
14:30

Pontypridd (Wales)	34–28	(Scotland) Glasgow
	Report

Sardis Road
Attendance: 5,500

28 September 2002
17:30

Newport (Wales)	25–27	(Wales) Cardiff
	Report

Rodney Parade
Attendance: 8,118

4 October 2002
19:30

Borders (Scotland)	33–12	(Scotland) Glasgow
	Report

Netherdale
Attendance: 5,500

4 October 2002
19:35

Leinster (Ireland)	42–14	(Wales) Newport
	Report

Donnybrook
Attendance: 6,000

5 October 2002
14:30

Cardiff (Wales)	37–12	(Wales) Bridgend
	Report

Cardiff Arms Park
Attendance: 7,500

5 October 2002
15:00

Connacht (Ireland)	0–40	(Wales) Pontypridd
	Report

Sportsground
Attendance: 3,000

25 October 2002
19:30

Glasgow (Scotland)	29–7	(Ireland) Connacht
	Report

Hughenden
Attendance: 3,250

26 October 2002
14:30

Bridgend (Wales)	18–39	(Ireland) Leinster
	Report

Brewery Field
Attendance: 1,000

26 October 2002
14:30

Newport (Wales)	24–8	(Scotland) Borders
	Report

Rodney Parade
Attendance: 5,700

26 October 2002
17:30

Pontypridd (Wales)	15–9	(Wales) Cardiff
	Report

Sardis Road
Attendance: 7,500

== Knockout stages ==
Quarter-finals
29 November 2002 – Musgrave Park
(Ireland) Munster	33
(Ireland) Connacht	3
30 November 2002 – Hughenden
(Scotland) Glasgow	17
(Ireland) Ulster	20
29 November 2002 – Sardis Road
(Wales) Pontypridd	12
(Wales) Neath	13
30 November 2002 – Meadowbank
(Scotland) Edinburgh	22
(Wales) Cardiff	26

Semi-finals
3 January 2003 – Thomond Park
(Ireland) Munster	42
(Ireland) Ulster	10
4 January 2003 – The Gnoll
(Wales) Neath	32
(Wales) Cardiff	10

Final
1 February 2003 – Millennium Stadium
(Ireland) Munster	37
(Wales) Neath	17

=== Quarter finals ===
29 November 2002
19:05

Pontypridd (Wales)	12–13	(Wales) Neath
	Report

Sardis Road
Attendance: 6,000

29 November 2002
19:35

Munster (Ireland)	33–3	(Ireland) Connacht
	Report

Musgrave Park
Attendance: 8,000

30 November 2002
14:45

Glasgow (Scotland)	17–20	(Ireland) Ulster
Try: Steel; Pen: Hayes (4)	Report	Try: Shields; Ward; Con: Humphreys (2); Pen: Humphreys (2)

Hughenden
Attendance: 5,346

30 November 2002
17:30

Edinburgh (Scotland)	22–26	(Wales) Cardiff
	Report

Meadowbank
Attendance: 3,918

=== Semi finals ===
3 January 2003
19:35

Munster (Ireland)	42–10	(Ireland) Ulster
Try: Hayes; Quinlan; Kelly; Mullins; Galwey; Con: O'Gara (3); Keane; Pen: O'Gara (3)	Report	Try: Humphreys; Con: Humphreys; Pen: Humphreys

Thomond Park
Attendance: 12,000

4 January 2003
17:30

Neath (Wales)	32–10	(Wales) Cardiff
	Report

The Gnoll
Attendance: 6,471

== Final ==
1 February 2003
14:45

Munster (Ireland)	37–17	(Wales) Neath
Try: Alan Quinlan; Marcus Horan; Rob Henderson; Con: Jeremy Staunton (2); Pen: Jeremy Staunton (2); Ronan O'Gara (4)	Report	Try: Adam Jones; Pen: Lee Jarvis (3); Drop: Lee Jarvis

Millennium Stadium, Cardiff
Attendance: 30,076
Referee: Chris White (England)

15	Jeremy Staunton
14	John Kelly
13	Mike Mullins
12	Jason Holland
11	Mossie Lawlor
10	Ronan O'Gara
9	Peter Stringer
8	Anthony Foley
7	Alan Quinlan
6	Jim Williams (c)
5	Mick O'Driscoll
4	Donncha O'Callaghan
3	John Hayes
2	Frankie Sheahan
1	Marcus Horan
Replacements:
16	James Blaney
17	Martin Cahill
18	Mick Galwey
19	Denis Leamy
20	Mike Prendergast
21	Rob Henderson
22	Killian Keane
Coach:
Alan Gaffney

15	Adrian Durston
14	Gareth Morris
13	James Storey
12	Tevita Tiueti
11	Shane Williams
10	Lee Jarvis
9	Andy Moore
8	Nathan Bonner-Evans
7	Brett Sinkinson
6	Alivereti 'Alfi' Mocelutu
5	Gareth Llewellyn (c)
4	Andy Newman
3	Adam Jones
2	Barry Williams
1	Duncan Jones
Replacements:
16	Allan Bateman
17	Shaun Connor
18	Steve Tandy
19	Adam Matthews
20	Rowland Phillips
21	Lyndon Bateman
22	Andrew Millward
Coach:
Lyn Jones

== Leading scorers ==
Note: Flags to the left of player names indicate national team as has been defined under IRB eligibility rules, or primary nationality for players who have not yet earned international senior caps. Players may hold one or more non-IRB nationalities.

=== Top points scorers ===
Rank	Player	Club	Points
1	(Scotland) Brendan Laney	(Scotland) Edinburgh	137
2	(Cook Islands) Tommy Hayes	(Scotland) Glasgow	105
3	(Wales) Iestyn Harris	(Wales) Cardiff	95
3	(Wales) Lee Jarvis	(Wales) Neath	95
5	(Wales) Arwel Thomas	(Wales) Swansea	86

=== Top try scorers ===
Rank	Player	Club	Tries
1	(Ireland) Mossie Lawlor	(Ireland) Munster	6
1	(Wales) Craig Morgan	(Wales) Cardiff	6
1	(Ireland) Mike Mullins	(Ireland) Munster	6
4	(Ireland) Denis Hickie	(Ireland) Leinster	5
4	(Scotland) Derrick Lee	(Scotland) Edinburgh	5
