= 2000 Heineken Cup final =

Rugby union competition

2000 Heineken Cup Final
- Event: 1999–2000 Heineken Cup
Northampton Saints	Munster
(England)	(Ireland)
9	8
- Date: 27 May 2000
- Venue: Twickenham Stadium, London
- Referee: Joël Dumé (France)
- Attendance: 68,441

The 2000 Heineken Cup Final was the final match of the 1999–2000 Heineken Cup, the fifth season of Europe's top club rugby union competition. The match was played on 27 May 2000 at Twickenham Stadium in London. The match was contested by Northampton Saints of England and Munster of Ireland. Northampton Saints won the match 9–8.

== Match details ==
27 May 2000
15:00 BST

Northampton Saints (England)	9–8	(Ireland) Munster
Pen: Grayson (3)	Report	Try: Wallace; Drop: Holland

Twickenham Stadium, London
Attendance: 68,441
Referee: Joël Dumé (France)

Northampton	Munster

FB	15	(England) Paul Grayson
RW	14	(Scotland) Craig Moir
OC	13	(Wales) Allan Bateman
IC	12	(England) Matt Allen
LW	11	(England) Ben Cohen
FH	10	(England) Ali Hepher
SH	9	(England) Dominic Malone
N8	8	(Samoa) Pat Lam (c)
OF	7	(Scotland) Budge Pountney
BF	6	(Australia) Don Mackinnion
RL	5	(England) Tim Rodber
LL	4	(Wales) Andy Newman
TP	3	(England) Matt Stewart
HK	2	(Argentina) Federico Mendez
LP	1	(South Africa) Garry Pagel
Substitutions:
HK	16	(England) Steve Walter
PR	17	(Argentina) Martín Scelzo
LK	18	(Scotland) Richard Metcalfe
LK	19	(England) Jon Phillips
SH	20	(England) James Bramhall
CE	21	(England) Andrew Northey
CE	22	(South Africa) Mark Tucker
Coach:
(England) John Steele

FB	15	(Ireland) Dominic Crotty
RW	14	(Ireland) John Kelly
OC	13	(Ireland) Mike Mullins
IC	12	(Ireland) Jason Holland
LW	11	(Ireland) Anthony Horgan
FH	10	(Ireland) Ronan O'Gara
SH	9	(Ireland) Peter Stringer
N8	8	(Ireland) Anthony Foley
OF	7	(Ireland) David Wallace
BF	6	(Ireland) Eddie Halvey
RL	5	(Australia) John Langford
LL	4	(Ireland) Mick Galwey(c)
TP	3	(Ireland) John Hayes
HK	2	(Ireland) Keith Wood
LP	1	(Ireland) Peter Clohessy
Substitutions:
HK	16	(Ireland) Frankie Sheahan
PR	17	(Ireland) Marcus Horan
LK	18	(Ireland) Donncha O'Callaghan
FL	19	(Ireland) Alan Quinlan
SH	20	(Ireland) Tom Tierney
CE	21	(Ireland) Killian Keane
WG	22	(Ireland) John O'Neill
Coach:
(Ireland) Declan Kidney

== See also ==
- 1999–2000 Heineken Cup
