= 1999–2000 European Challenge Cup pool stage =

- Season: 1999–2000 European Challenge Cup
- Date: 19 November 1999 - 16 January 2000

Qualifiers

The pool stage of the 1999–2000 European Challenge Cup.

== Pool 1 ==
| Team | P | W | D | L | Tries for | Tries against | Try diff | Points for | Points against | Points diff | Pts |
|---|---|---|---|---|---|---|---|---|---|---|---|
| (England) Bristol Shoguns | 6 | 5 | 0 | 1 | 18 | 8 | 10 | 165 | 96 | 69 | 10 |
| (France) Bordeaux-Begles | 6 | 4 | 0 | 2 | 18 | 11 | 7 | 158 | 124 | 34 | 8 |
| (France) Dax | 6 | 3 | 0 | 3 | 12 | 14 | −2 | 129 | 146 | −17 | 6 |
| (Italy) Calvisano | 6 | 0 | 0 | 6 | 3 | 18 | −15 | 69 | 155 | −86 | 0 |

20 November 1999
14:30

| Calvisano (Italy) | 16 – 25 | (France) Bordeaux-Begles |

Centro Sportivo San Michele
Attendance: 1,200

20 November 1999
19:30

| Dax (France) | 21 – 28 | (England) Bristol Shoguns |

Stade Maurice Boyau
Attendance: 5,000

26 November 1999
20:00

| Bordeaux-Begles (France) | 33 – 19 | (France) Dax |

Stade Andre Moga
Attendance: 6,000

28 November 1999
15:00

| Bristol Shoguns (England) | 20 – 6 | (Italy) Calvisano |

Memorial Ground
Attendance: 2,334

10 December 1999
19:30

| Bristol Shoguns (England) | 27 – 19 | (France) Bordeaux-Begles |

Memorial Ground
Attendance: 1,700

11 December 1999
19:30

| Dax (France) | 33 – 6 | (Italy) Calvisano |

Stade Maurice Boyau
Attendance: 3,000

17 December 1999
20:00

| Bordeaux-Begles (France) | 28 – 14 | (England) Bristol Shoguns |

Stade Andre Moga
Attendance: 3,000

18 December 1999
14:30

| Calvisano (Italy) | 9 – 18 | (France) Dax |

Centro Sportivo San Michele
Attendance: 600

8 January 2000
14:30

| Calvisano (Italy) | 9 – 26 | (England) Bristol Shoguns |

Centro Sportivo San Michele
Attendance: 1,000

8 January 2000
19:30

| Dax (France) | 25 – 20 | (France) Bordeaux-Begles |

Stade Maurice Boyau
Attendance: 5,000

14 January 2000
20:00

| Bordeaux-Begles (France) | 33 – 23 | (Italy) Calvisano |

Stade Andre Moga
Attendance: 2,000

16 January 2000
15:00

| Bristol Shoguns (England) | 50 – 13 | (France) Dax |

Memorial Ground
Attendance: 3,206

== Pool 2 ==
| Team | P | W | D | L | Tries for | Tries against | Try diff | Points for | Points against | Points diff | Pts |
|---|---|---|---|---|---|---|---|---|---|---|---|
| (France) Castres Olympique | 6 | 6 | 0 | 0 | 39 | 12 | 27 | 249 | 94 | 155 | 12 |
| (Wales) Newport | 6 | 3 | 0 | 3 | 15 | 14 | 1 | 137 | 119 | 18 | 6 |
| (England) Bedford Blues | 6 | 2 | 0 | 4 | 15 | 31 | −16 | 121 | 223 | −102 | 4 |
| (Italy) Rugby Rovigo | 6 | 1 | 0 | 5 | 13 | 25 | −12 | 107 | 178 | −71 | 2 |

20 November 1999
19:30

| Castres (France) | 27 – 12 | (Italy) Rugby Rovigo |

Stade Pierre Antoine
Attendance: 1,000

20 November 1999
15:00

| Bedford Blues (England) | 28 – 18 | (Wales) Newport |

Goldington Road
Attendance: 1,875

27 November 1999
17:30

| Newport (Wales) | 22 – 26 | (France) Castres |

Rodney Parade
Attendance: 6,000

28 November 1999
14:30

| Rugby Rovigo (Italy) | 24 – 33 | (England) Bedford Blues |

Stadio Mario Battaglini
Attendance: 1,500

11 December 1999
14:00

| Bedford Blues (England) | 25 – 60 | (France) Castres |

Goldington Road
Attendance: 1,438

11 December 1999
14:30

| Newport (Wales) | 26 – 10 | (Italy) Rugby Rovigo |

Rodney Parade
Attendance: 3,000

18 December 1999
14:30

| Castres (France) | 56 – 6 | (England) Bedford Blues |

Stade Pierre Antoine
Attendance: 3,000

19 December 1999
14:00

| Rugby Rovigo (Italy) | 15 – 23 | (Wales) Newport |

Stadio Mario Battaglini
Attendance: 800

8 January 2000
15:00

| Castres (France) | 21 – 3 | (Wales) Newport |

Stade Pierre Antoine
Attendance: 4,586

9 January 2000
14:00

| Bedford Blues (England) | 10 – 20 | (Italy) Rugby Rovigo |

Goldington Road
Attendance: 1,313

15 January 2000
17:30

| Newport (Wales) | 45 – 19 | (England) Bedford Blues |

Rodney Parade
Attendance: 3,000

16 January 2000
15:00

| Rugby Rovigo (Italy) | 26 – 59 | (France) Castres |

Stadio Mario Battaglini
Attendance: 1,450

== Pool 3 ==
| Team | P | W | D | L | Tries for | Tries against | Try diff | Points for | Points against | Points diff | Pts |
|---|---|---|---|---|---|---|---|---|---|---|---|
| (France) Pau | 6 | 5 | 0 | 1 | 32 | 9 | 23 | 229 | 114 | 115 | 10 |
| (France) Perpignan | 6 | 5 | 0 | 1 | 24 | 9 | 15 | 200 | 104 | 96 | 10 |
| (England) Sale Sharks | 6 | 2 | 0 | 4 | 17 | 24 | −7 | 168 | 181 | −13 | 4 |
| (Wales) Caerphilly | 6 | 0 | 0 | 6 | 8 | 39 | −31 | 81 | 279 | −198 | 0 |

20 November 1999
14:00

| Caerphilly (Wales) | 21 – 33 | (France) Pau |

Virginia Park
Attendance: 1,000

20 November 1999
15:00

| Sale Sharks (England) | 16 – 28 | (France) Perpignan |

Heywood Road
Attendance: 2,076

27 November 1999
19:30

| Perpignan (France) | 53 – 7 | (Wales) Caerphilly |

Stade Aimé Giral
Attendance: 3,000

27 November 1999
19:00

| Pau (France) | 30 – 12 | (England) Sale Sharks |

Stade Municipal du Hameau
Attendance: 5,500

11 December 1999
15:00

| Sale Sharks (England) | 51 – 14 | (Wales) Caerphilly |

Heywood Road
Attendance: 1,086

12 December 1999
15:30

| Perpignan (France) | 18 – 13 | (France) Pau |

Stade Aimé Giral
Attendance: 2,000

18 December 1999
14:30

| Caerphilly (Wales) | 10 – 31 | (England) Sale Sharks |

Virginia Park
Attendance: 500

18 December 1999
19:30

| Pau (France) | 28 – 16 | (France) Perpignan |

Stade Municipal du Hameau
Attendance: 7,000

8 January 2000
14:30

| Caerphilly (Wales) | 17 – 39 | (France) Perpignan |

Virginia Park
Attendance: 600

8 January 2000
15:00

| Sale Sharks (England) | 35 – 53 | (France) Pau |

Heywood Road
Attendance: 1,575

14 January 2000
19:30

| Pau (France) | 72 – 12 | (Wales) Caerphilly |

Stade Municipal du Hameau
Attendance: 6,000

15 January 2000
15:00

| Perpignan (France) | 46 – 23 | (England) Sale Sharks |

Stade Aimé Giral
Attendance: 3,120

== Pool 4 ==
| Team | P | W | D | L | Tries for | Tries against | Try diff | Points for | Points against | Points diff | Pts |
|---|---|---|---|---|---|---|---|---|---|---|---|
| (Wales) Ebbw Vale | 6 | 6 | 0 | 0 | 31 | 13 | 18 | 252 | 127 | 125 | 12 |
| (France) Toulon | 6 | 3 | 0 | 3 | 17 | 8 | 9 | 178 | 148 | 30 | 6 |
| (Ireland) Connacht | 6 | 2 | 0 | 4 | 15 | 18 | −3 | 131 | 165 | −34 | 4 |
| (Romania) Steaua București | 6 | 1 | 0 | 5 | 13 | 37 | −24 | 120 | 241 | −121 | 2 |

19 November 1999
19:30

| Ebbw Vale (Wales) | 32 – 9 | (Ireland) Connacht |

Eugene Cross Park
Attendance: 2,500

20 November 1999
14:30

| Steaua Bucharest (Romania) | 19 – 30 | (France) Toulon |

Club of Army
Attendance: 2,500

27 November 1999
14:30

| Steaua Bucharest (Romania) | 30 – 20 | (Ireland) Connacht |

Club of Army
Attendance: 1,500

27 November 1999
20:00

| Toulon (France) | 19 – 21 | (Wales) Ebbw Vale |

Stade Félix Mayol
Attendance: 3,000

10 December 1999
19:30

| Ebbw Vale (Wales) | 58 – 27 | (Romania) Steaua Bucharest |

Eugene Cross Park
Attendance: 2,000

11 December 1999
14:30

| Connacht (Ireland) | 27 – 13 | (France) Toulon |

Sportsground
Attendance: 1,000

18 December 1999
14:30

| Steaua Bucharest (Romania) | 27 – 43 | (Wales) Ebbw Vale |

Club of Army
Attendance: 1,500

18 December 1999
20:00

| Toulon (France) | 41 – 15 | (Ireland) Connacht |

Stade Félix Mayol
Attendance: 1,500

8 January 2000
14:30

| Connacht (Ireland) | 41 – 7 | (Romania) Steaua Bucharest |

Sportsground
Attendance: 1,000

8 January 2000
17:30

| Ebbw Vale (Wales) | 56 – 26 | (France) Toulon |

Eugene Cross Park
Attendance: 3,000

15 January 2000
14:30

| Connacht (Ireland) | 19 – 42 | (Wales) Ebbw Vale |

Sportsground
Attendance: 1,500

15 January 2000
18:00

| Toulon (France) | 49 – 10 | (Romania) Steaua Bucharest |

Stade Félix Mayol
Attendance: 2,000

== Pool 5 ==
| Team | P | W | D | L | Tries for | Tries against | Try diff | Points for | Points against | Points diff | Pts |
|---|---|---|---|---|---|---|---|---|---|---|---|
| (France) Biarritz | 6 | 5 | 0 | 1 | 34 | 8 | 26 | 227 | 77 | 150 | 10 |
| (England) Gloucester | 6 | 4 | 1 | 1 | 25 | 12 | 13 | 188 | 113 | 75 | 9 |
| (Wales) Bridgend RFC | 6 | 2 | 1 | 3 | 13 | 20 | −7 | 113 | 151 | −38 | 5 |
| Spain XV | 6 | 0 | 0 | 6 | 7 | 39 | −32 | 79 | 266 | −187 | 0 |

20 November 1999
14:30

| Bridgend (Wales) | 37 – 21 | Spain XV |

Brewery Field
Attendance: 1,200

20 November 1999
15:00

| Gloucester (England) | 22 – 13 | (France) Biarritz |

Kingsholm
Attendance: 3,218

27 November 1999
18:30

| Biarritz (France) | 29 – 6 | (Wales) Bridgend |

Parc des Sports Aguilera
Attendance: 3,000

28 November 1999
12:30

| Spain XV | 19 – 42 | (England) Gloucester |

Kenmare
Attendance: 2,000

8 December 1999
16:00

| Spain XV | 3 – 59 | (France) Biarritz |

Kenmare
Attendance: 1,200

11 December 1999
17:30

| Bridgend (Wales) | 29 – 29 | (England) Gloucester |

Brewery Field
Attendance: 1,500

15 December 1999
19:30

| Biarritz (France) | 57 – 10 | Spain XV |

Parc des Sports Aguilera
Attendance: 1,000

18 December 1999
15:00

| Gloucester (England) | 23 – 6 | (Wales) Bridgend |

Kingsholm
Attendance: 3,000

8 January 2000
14:30

| Bridgend (Wales) | 11 – 30 | (France) Biarritz |

Brewery Field
Attendance: 1,300

8 January 2000
15:00

| Gloucester (England) | 47 – 7 | Spain XV |

Kingsholm
Attendance: 3,361

15 January 2000
18:30

| Biarritz (France) | 39 – 25 | (England) Gloucester |

Parc des Sports Aguilera
Attendance: 5,000

16 January 2000
12:30

| Spain XV | 19 – 24 | (Wales) Bridgend |

Pepe Rojo

== Pool 6 ==
| Team | P | W | D | L | Tries for | Tries against | Try diff | Points for | Points against | Points diff | Pts |
|---|---|---|---|---|---|---|---|---|---|---|---|
| (England) Newcastle Falcons | 6 | 5 | 0 | 1 | 24 | 8 | 16 | 200 | 90 | 110 | 10 |
| (France) Narbonne | 6 | 3 | 0 | 3 | 19 | 7 | 12 | 153 | 96 | 57 | 6 |
| (France) Aurillac | 6 | 3 | 0 | 3 | 13 | 20 | −7 | 125 | 153 | −28 | 6 |
| (Wales) Dunvant | 6 | 1 | 0 | 5 | 11 | 32 | −21 | 92 | 231 | −139 | 2 |

21 November 1999
15:00

| Aurillac (France) | 53 – 22 | (Wales) Dunvant |

Stade Jean Alric
Attendance: 2,508

21 November 1999
19:30

| Narbonne (France) | 19 – 20 | (England) Newcastle Falcons |

Parc des Sports et de l'Amitié
Attendance: 2,000

27 November 1999
14:30

| Dunvant (Wales) | 16 – 42 | (France) Narbonne |

Broadacre
Attendance: 300

28 November 1999
15:00

| Newcastle Falcons (England) | 55 – 7 | (France) Aurillac |

Kingston Park Stadium
Attendance: 1,975

11 December 1999
14:30

| Dunvant (Wales) | 26 – 45 | (England) Newcastle Falcons |

Broadacre
Attendance: 400

12 December 1999
15:00

| Aurillac (France) | 18 – 15 | (France) Narbonne |

Stade Jean Alric
Attendance: 2,000

18 December 1999
19:30

| Narbonne (France) | 36 – 20 | (France) Aurillac |

Parc des Sports et de l'Amitié
Attendance: 1,000

19 December 1999
14:30

| Newcastle Falcons (England) | 51 – 10 | (Wales) Dunvant |

Kingston Park Stadium
Attendance: 1,349

8 January 2000
19:30

| Narbonne (France) | 30 – 3 | (Wales) Dunvant |

Parc des Sports et de l'Amitié
Attendance: 1,500

9 January 2000
15:00

| Aurillac (France) | 17 – 10 | (England) Newcastle Falcons |

Stade Jean Alric
Attendance: 3,500

14 January 2000
19:30

| Newcastle Falcons (England) | 19 – 11 | (France) Narbonne |

Kingston Park Stadium
Attendance: 1,599

15 January 2000
14:30

| Dunvant (Wales) | 15 – 10 | (France) Aurillac |

Broadacre
Attendance: 200

== Pool 7 ==
| Team | P | W | D | L | Tries for | Tries against | Try diff | Points for | Points against | Points diff | Pts |
|---|---|---|---|---|---|---|---|---|---|---|---|
| (England) London Irish | 6 | 4 | 0 | 2 | 24 | 19 | 5 | 192 | 140 | 52 | 8 |
| (France) Agen | 6 | 5 | 0 | 1 | 30 | 7 | 23 | 211 | 100 | 111 | 8* |
| (France) Brive | 6 | 3 | 0 | 3 | 25 | 18 | 7 | 199 | 162 | 37 | 6 |
| (Italy) Rugby Roma | 6 | 0 | 0 | 6 | 9 | 44 | −35 | 94 | 294 | −200 | 0 |

* Agen deducted two points for fielding non-registered players in two matches.

20 November 1999
14:30

| Rugby Roma (Italy) | 26 – 29 | (France) Agen |

Stadio Tre Fontane
Attendance: 1,000

20 November 1999
15:00

| London Irish (England) | 37 – 21 | (France) Brive |

The Twickenham Stoop
Attendance: 3,131

27 November 1999
19:30

| Agen (France) | 28 – 16 | (England) London Irish |

Stade Armandie
Attendance: 3,000

28 November 1999
15:00

| Brive (France) | 64 – 17 | (Italy) Rugby Roma |

Stadium Municipal, Brive
Attendance: 5,500

11 December 1999
19:30

| Agen (France) | 31 – 9 | (France) Brive |

Stade Armandie
Attendance: 4,000

12 December 1999
14:30

| Rugby Roma (Italy) | 7 – 46 | (England) London Irish |

Stadio Tre Fontane
Attendance: 800

18 December 1999
14:30

| Brive (France) | 13 – 28 | (France) Agen |

Stadium Municipal, Brive
Attendance: 2,500

18 December 1999
15:00

| London Irish (England) | 39 – 13 | (Italy) Rugby Roma |

The Twickenham Stoop
Attendance: 2,883

8 January 2000
15:00

| London Irish (England) | 23 – 22 | (France) Agen |

The Twickenham Stoop
Attendance: 3,088

9 January 2000
14:30

| Rugby Roma (Italy) | 18 – 43 | (France) Brive |

Stadio Tre Fontane
Attendance: 800

15 January 2000
19:30

| Agen (France) | 73 – 13 | (Italy) Rugby Roma |

Stade Armandie
Attendance: 3,000

16 January 2000
15:00

| Brive (France) | 49 – 31 | (England) London Irish |

Stadium Municipal, Brive
Attendance: 5,000

== See also ==
- European Challenge Cup
- 1999–2000 Heineken Cup
