= Cork Constitution =

Irish rugby union club, based in Cork

- Full name: Cork Constitution Football Club
- Union: (Ireland) IRFU
- Branch: Munster
- Nickname: Con
- Founded: 1892; 134 years ago
- Ground(s): Temple Hill, Ballintemple, Cork (Capacity: ~5,000)
- League: All-Ireland League Div. 1A
- 2024–25: 3rd. (Runner-up)
Team kit

Official website
- corkcon.ie

The Cork Constitution (CC) is a rugby union club based in Cork in Ireland that plays in Division 1A of the All-Ireland League. Also known as "Cork Con" or simply "Con", the club is based at Temple Hill, Ballintemple.

The club was founded in 1892 by staff of the Cork Constitution newspaper. Since the paper did not publish on Sundays, the staff were looking for activities to pursue on Saturday afternoons. In the summer, cricket was played, while in the winter, rugby was the designated activity. The rugby club developed from the newspaper staff's cricket club, with H.L. Tivy serving as its first president. By 1898, four players from Cork Constitution had represented Munster, including Edward McCarthy, who also represented Ireland.

Con were the inaugural All-Ireland League champions in 1990–91, and reached the league final on six occasions since 2001 inclusive; losing in 2001 to Dungannon RFC, losing in 2002 to Shannon RFC, again losing in 2004 to Shannon and losing in 2007 to Garryowen FC, winning an elusive third title in 2008 on beating Garryowen in Musgrave Park and capturing a fourth title when beating St. Mary's by 17 points to 10 after extra time in Dubarry Park in May 2010. This 2010 league victory completed an AIL double as Con had already won the AIL Cup earlier in the season. Their most recent AIL victory was in 2023-24, their seventh title.

The All-Ireland Bateman Cup, played between the Provincial Cup winners, was re-inaugurated in 2005-06, and Cork Constitution have now won it on seven times.

== Honours ==
- All-Ireland League: 7
  - 1990–91, 1998–99, 2007-08, 2009–10, 2016–17, 2018–19, 2023-24
- All-Ireland Cup: 7
  - 2005–06, 2009–10, 2012–13, 2013–14, 2014–15, 2015–16, 2016–17
- Munster Senior Cup: 30
  - 1905–07, 1910, 1922–23, 1928–29, 1932–33, 1942–43, 1945–46, 1956–57, 1960–61, 1964–65, 1966–67, 1969–70, 1972–73, 1982–83, 1984–85, 1988–89, 2008–09, 2012–13, 2013–14, 2014–15, 2015–16, 2016–17 2018–19 2019–20
- Munster Senior League
  - 1912 (shared), 1914 (shared), 1922, 1923, 1927, 1939, 1953, 1957, 1964, 1965, 1966, 1967, 1968, 1969, 1970, 1971, 1972, 1975, 1976, 1977, 1979, 1984, 1987, 1988, 1998

== Notable players ==
- Stephen Archer
- Michael Bradley
- Paul Burke
- Rory Burke
- David Corkery
- Jack Crowley
- John Daly
- Shane Daly
- Jody Danaher
- Scott Deasy
- Ivan Dineen
- Len Dineen
- Garrett Fitzgerald
- Denis Fogarty
- John Fogarty
- Seán French
- Tom Gleeson
- Brian Hayes
- Billy Holland
- Jonathan Holland
- Anthony Horgan
- Darragh Hurley
- Gerry Hurley
- John Kelly
- Alex Kendellen
- Ralph Keyes
- Tom Kiernan
- Denis Leamy
- Donal Lenihan
- Cian Mahony
- Conor Mahony
- Jeremy Manning
- Paul McCarthy
- Alex McHenry
- Tommy Moroney
- Frank Murphy
- Kenny Murphy
- Noel F. Murphy
- Noel A. A. Murphy
- Ian Murray
- Ian Nagle
- Ross Noonan
- Kevin O'Byrne
- Donncha O'Callaghan
- Ultan O'Callaghan
- Liam O'Connor
- Mick O'Driscoll
- Ronan O'Gara
- Pat O'Hara
- David O'Mahony
- Peter O'Mahony
- Brian O'Meara
- John O'Neill
- Conrad O'Sullivan
- John Poland
- Brian Roche
- Mike Ross
- John Ryan
- Tim Ryan
- Frankie Sheahan
- Bodo Sieber
- Brian Toland
- Brian Walsh
- Duncan Williams
- Simon Zebo
