= Paul McCarthy (disambiguation) =

Paul McCarthy (born 1945) is an American contemporary artist.

Paul McCarthy may also refer to:

- Paul McCarthy (footballer) (1971–2017), Irish footballer
- Paul McCarthy (actor) (born 1967), Australian comedy actor
- Paul McCarthy (rugby union), Irish rugby union player and coach

== See also ==
- Paul McCartney (born 1942), English singer-songwriter, musician and composer
