= Brendan Foley =

Brendan Foley may refer to:

- Brendan Foley (filmmaker)
- Brendan Foley (rugby union)
