= James Storey =

James Storey may refer to:

- Jim Storey (1929–2025), English footballer
- James Storey (rugby union) (born 1976), rugby union player, see 2004–05 Munster Rugby season
- James Storey (sailor), see International 14 World Championships
