= Brian Roche =

Brian Roche may refer to:

- Brian Roche (American football) (born 1973), American football tight end
- Brian Roche (business executive), New Zealand business executive
- Brian Roche (hurler), Irish hurler
- Brian Roche (rugby union), Irish rugby union player and coach

== See also ==
- Bryan Róchez, Honduran footballer
