= Brian Roche (rugby union) =

Irish rugby union player and coach

- Born: Brian Patrick Roche; 1 July 1974 (age 52) Togher, Cork, Ireland
- Weight: 80 kg (13 st; 180 lb)

Rugby union career
- Position(s): Fullback, Wing
Amateur team(s)
Years	Team	Apps	(Points)
- Highfield
–	Sundays Well		
–	Cork Constitution		
–	Shannon		
Senior career
Years	Team	Apps	(Points)
1997	Bath	7	(10)
1998–1999	Munster	8	(0)

Brian Patrick Roche (born 1 July 1974) is an Irish former rugby union player and coach.

== Career ==
From Togher, Cork, Roche grew up playing hurling for St Finbarr's, before a clubman from Highfield suggested that he try rugby union. A promising start to his rugby career, combined with his hurling career, in which he had won selection for the Cork minors panel, meant Roche had to choose between the two sports, and he chose rugby, joining Sundays Well in his early 20s. After one season with the club, at a time when rugby union was turning professional, Roche was approached to join English side Bath on trial, but he initially rejected the offer. When Bath returned with an offer of a professional contract, Roche then accepted, and moved across the Irish Sea to join the club, which included famous players such as Jeremy Guscott, Ieuan Evans and Mike Catt.

As Welsh winger Evans was away on his honeymoon, Roche got a run in the Bath starting XV, and featured prominently during the 1997–98 Heineken Cup pool stage, though he wasn't involved in the 1998 Heineken Cup Final, in which Bath defeated French club Brive 19–18. Despite this, Roche was still presented with a winners medal by Bath, making him the first Irishman to win a Heineken Cup medal. He then returned to Ireland and won selection for Munster, moving to Limerick and joining Shannon in the All-Ireland League. He remained with the province for the remainder of the 1998–99 season, but was then dropped.

After being dropped, Roche returned to his roots, playing intermediate football for St Finbarr's, before returning to Highfield and captaining the side to a league championship in 2004. He also went into coaching, earning a level two badge with the IRFU and a fitness qualification, going on to work with St Finbarr's, Highfield, University College Cork A.F.C. in the Munster Senior League, and the Cork senior hurling team.
