= Brendan Foley (rugby union) =

Irish former rugby union player

- Born: Brendan Oliver Foley; 6 August 1950 (age 76) Limerick, Ireland
- School: St. Mary's CBS
- Notable relative(s): Anthony Foley (son); Rosie Foley (daughter)

Rugby union career
- Position: Lock
Amateur team(s)
Years	Team	Apps	(Points)
- St. Mary's
–	Shannon		
Provincial / State sides
Years	Team	Apps	(Points)
- Munster
International career
Years	Team	Apps	(Points)
1976–1981	Ireland	11	(0)
- Correct as of 19 October 2016

Brendan Oliver Foley (born 6 August 1950) is an Irish former rugby union player, who played in the amateur era of the sport. He played primarily as a lock. Foley spent most of his club career with Shannon in Limerick and played at provincial level for Munster, starting in the team's famous victory over New Zealand in 1978. Foley also played internationally for Ireland, winning 11 caps between 1976 and 1981. Foley is the father of two Ireland rugby internationals Anthony Foley (1973–2016) and Rosie Foley.

== Early life ==
Foley was born in Limerick and was a student at St. Mary's CBS in the city. He initially played for the Saints' team at club level for a short time, but switched to Shannon where he spent the rest of his senior club career.

== Rugby career ==
=== Shannon ===
Foley played for Shannon throughout the 1970s and into the 1980s during which time Shannon became a force in Munster rugby and aimed to challenge Garryowen, the most successful club in Munster club history and create a classic rivalry that continues to this day. Shannon won the Munster Senior Cup in the 1976–77, 1977–78 and 1981–82 seasons.

=== Munster ===
Foley played for Munster in many famous games. An "outstanding performance" in a narrow defeat against a touring Australia in 1976 earned him his first ever cap for Ireland two weeks later. By coincidence, he also played in the Munster side that beat Australia in 1981 just a week before his final appearance for Ireland. His best known appearance for Munster however, came when they famously beat New Zealand on 31 October 1978, with Foley playing alongside his Shannon club mates Colm Tucker and Gerry McLoughlin in the side.

=== Ireland ===
Foley made his debut for Ireland against France in Parc des Princes on 7 February 1976, on the back of a strong performance for Munster against Australia two weeks previously. He went on to play 11 times for Ireland, with eight of these appearances coming in the Five Nations Championship. Foley made his last international appearance on 21 November 1981 against Australia in Lansdowne Road.
