= Mick Moylett =

Irish rugby union player

- Full name: Michael Martin Francis Moylett
- Born: 29 August 1960 (age 66) Dublin, Ireland
- Height: 6 ft 4 in (193 cm)

Rugby union career
- Position: Lock
International career
Years	Team	Apps	(Points)
1988	Ireland	1	(0)

Michael Martin Francis Moylett (born 29 August 1960) is an Irish former rugby union international.

Moylett comes from Ballina, County Mayo and attended Castleknock College.

A lock, Moylett was a strong scrummager who was a member of a successful Shannon side which was built around its strong pack. He also played for Connacht and while studying in England during the early 1980s linked up with provincial teammate John O'Driscoll at Manchester. In the 1988 Five Nations, Moylett gained an Ireland cap, playing at Twickenham against England. He was working at the time at his family's hotel in Ballina.

== See also ==
- List of Ireland national rugby union players
