= Josh Costello =

Irish rugby player

- School: St Munchin's College

Rugby union career
- Position: Winger
- Current team: Shannon RFC; Munster
Senior career
Years	Team	Apps	(Points)
2022-	Shannon RFC		
2023-	Munster		
International career
Years	Team	Apps	(Points)
2022-2023	Irelamd U20		
National sevens team
Years	Team		Comps
2024-	Ireland 7s		

Josh Costello is an Irish rugby union footballer who plays as a winger for Shannon RFC, Munster Rugby and the Ireland national rugby sevens team.

== Early life ==
He attended St Munchin's College in Limerick, Ireland. In 2022, he was playing for the Munster Rugby academy.

== Club career ==
In May 2023 he scored a brace of tries in the All Ireland League play-off for Shannon RFC. Later that year he played for the development side of Munster Rugby and featured as a replacement in first-team matches for the club, making his senior debut against Connacht Rugby in September 2023.

== International career ==
In 2022 he featured for Ireland U19. In the 2022-2023 season, he played for Ireland national under-20 rugby union team.

He made his starting debut for Ireland national rugby sevens team against the United States in the 2023-24 SVNS series. He played for Ireland against France in the final of the 2024 Rugby Europe Sevens Championship Series in Croatia in June 2024.

He was then also selected for the Irish Sevens squad that started the 2024-25 SVNS series, scoring a brace of tries at the Dubai Sevens against Uruguay on 30 November 2024.
