= Paul McCarthy (rugby union) =

Irish rugby union player

- Born: Paul David McCarthy; 27 August 1963 (age 63) Cork, Ireland
- Height: 1.83 m (6 ft 0 in)
- Weight: 114 kg (18.0 st; 251 lb)

Rugby union career
- Position: Prop
Amateur team(s)
Years	Team	Apps	(Points)
- Cork Constitution
Senior career
Years	Team	Apps	(Points)
c.1992–1996	Munster	6+	(0)
International career
Years	Team	Apps	(Points)
1992–1993	Ireland	5	(0)

Paul McCarthy (born 27 August 1963) is an Irish former rugby union player and coach.

== Career ==
From Cork, McCarthy represented local amateur club Cork Constitution during his career, playing in the newly formed All-Ireland League in the 1990s, and also played for Munster, featuring in the side that famously beat 1991 Rugby World Cup winners Australia in 1992. McCarthy also won five caps for Ireland between 1992 and 1993, and represented the Barbarians.

Outside of rugby, McCarthy was a business development manager for ABB Ireland, which he combined with a part-time scrum coach role with Munster from the 2002–03 season. From the 2010–11 season, McCarthy was appointed Munster's full-time scrum coach, and spent a week with New Zealand's scrum coach Mike Cron, but due to cost cutting by the province, McCarthy's contract with Munster was not renewed at the end of the 2012–13 season, despite McCarthy having earned widespread praise for his work.
