= Brian Hayes (rugby union) =

- Born: 25 September 1990 (age 36) Cork, Ireland
- Height: 1.96 m (6 ft 5 in)
- Weight: 114 kg (18.0 st; 251 lb)
- School: Christian Brothers College

Rugby union career
- Position: Lock
- Current team: Aurillac
Amateur team(s)
Years	Team	Apps	(Points)
- Cork Constitution
Senior career
Years	Team	Apps	(Points)
2010–2013	Munster	2	(0)
2013–2015	Aurillac	39	(10)
- Correct as of 11 February 2015
International career
Years	Team	Apps	(Points)
2009–2010	Ireland U20	10	(0)
- Correct as of 11 February 2015

Brian Hayes (born 25 September 1990) is an Irish rugby union player. He captained Christian Brothers College to the Munster Schools Senior Cup title in 2009.

== Munster ==
He moved from the Munster Sub-Academy to the Munster Rugby Academy at the start of the 2010–11 season. Hayes made his full Munster debut against a touring Australia side in November 2010. His second cap for Munster came against Newport Gwent Dragons, also in November 2010. He started for Munster A when they won the 2011–12 British and Irish Cup on 27 April 2012.

== Aurillac ==
Hayes joined French Rugby Pro D2 side Stade Aurillacois Cantal Auvergne, better known as Aurillac, for the 2013–14 season, in an attempt to gain more gametime.
