= Shane O'Connor (rugby union) =

Irish rugby union and rugby league footballer

- Born: March 29, 1983 (age 43) Cork, Ireland

Rugby union career
- Position: Lock
Amateur team(s)
Years	Team	Apps	(Points)
–	Cork Constitution		
Senior career
Years	Team	Apps	(Points)
2006–2008	Munster	3	
2008–2009	Harlequins	3	
2009-2011	Union Bordeaux Bègles	8	
2011-2012	Montluçon	37	
2012-2013	Saint-Étienne	12	

Shane O'Connor (born 29 March 1983) is a former rugby union player from Ireland. Originally playing for Cork Constitution, he was a member of the Ireland under-21 team that reached the Under 21 Rugby World Championship final in 2004. He joined the Munster squad in 2006 as a second-row (lock), before moving to Harlequins in the Guinness Premiership in England during 2008. Released by Harlequins in 2009, he played several seasons in the National Rugby League and Fédérale 1 League in France.
