= Jody Danaher =

Irish rugby union player

Jody Danagher is a retired Irish rugby player. He played as a tighthead prop-forward for UL Bohemian, Cork Constitution and Munster. He retired in 2006.
