= Cian Mahony =

Irish rugby union player

- Born: 31 December 1976 (age 49) Cork, Ireland
- Height: 1.83 m (6 ft 0 in)
- Weight: 90 kg (14 st; 200 lb)

Rugby union career
- Position: Centre
Amateur team(s)
Years	Team	Apps	(Points)
- Cork Constitution
Senior career
Years	Team	Apps	(Points)
1997–1999	Munster	7	(5)

Cian Mahony (born 31 December 1974) is a former Irish rugby union player.

== Career ==
Mahony played for Cork Constitution in the amateur All-Ireland League, and made seven appearances for Munster between 1997 and 1999, including in the 1998–99 and 1999–2000 Heineken Cup's, but having found first-team opportunities limited with the province, Mahony turned away from professional rugby, though he still played for Con.
