= Simon Kerr =

Australian rugby union player

- Born: 4 January 1970 (age 56) Berrigan, New South Wales, Australia
- Height: 1.78 m (5 ft 10 in)
- Weight: 117 kg (18.4 st; 258 lb)
- University: Wagga Agricultural College

Rugby union career
- Position: Prop
Senior career
Years	Team	Apps	(Points)
- Gold Coast Breakers
- Southland
2002–2004	Munster	22	(5)
Super Rugby
Years	Team	Apps	(Points)
1996–1997	Waratahs		
2001–2002	Reds		

Simon Kerr (born 4 January 1970) is a retired Australian rugby union footballer who played for the Waratahs and Reds in Super Rugby, Southland in New Zealand's National Provincial Championship and Irish province Munster in the Celtic League and Heineken Cup.

Having previously represented Australian sides New South Wales Waratahs and Queensland Reds in Super Rugby, and also Gold Coast Breakers and New Zealand side Southland in the National Provincial Championship, Kerr joined Irish province Munster in August 2002, ahead of the 2002–03 season. He went on to earn 22 caps for the province, as well as scoring 1 try, in his two seasons in Ireland.
