= Dominic Malone =

English rugby union player

- Born: Dominic James Malone; 12 December 1974 (age 51) Bedford, England
- Height: 1.83 m (6 ft 0 in)
- Weight: 95 kg (14 st 13 lb)

Rugby union career
- Position: Scrum-half
Amateur team(s)
| Years | Team | Apps | (Points) |
- UL Bohemians
Senior career
| Years | Team | Apps | (Points) |
- Bedford Blues
| 1997–2002 | Northampton Saints | 75+ | |
| 2002 | Munster | 5 | |
- Correct as of 12 February 2020

Dominic James Malone (born 12 December 1974) is a former professional rugby union player from England who represented Bedford Blues, Northampton Saints and Irish provincial side Munster during his career.

== Career ==
Having previously represented hometown club Bedford Blues, Malone spent five seasons playing for Northampton Saints, with whom he won the 1999–2000 Heineken Cup. Saints defeated Irish province Munster 9–8 in the final, who Malone went on to join in 2002. Whilst at Munster, Malone was registered with Limerick club UL Bohemians.
