= Colm Tucker =

Irish rugby union player

- Born: Colm Christopher Tucker; 22 September 1952 Limerick, Ireland
- Died: 11 January 2012 (aged 59)
- Height: 186 cm (6 ft 1 in)
- Weight: 99 kg (15 st 8 lb; 218 lb)
- School: St. Munchin's College

Rugby union career
- Position: Flanker
International career
Years	Team	Apps	(Points)
1979–1980	Ireland	3	(0)
1980	British & Irish Lions	2	(0)

Colm Tucker (22 September 1952 – 11 January 2012) was an Ireland international rugby union player. He toured South Africa in 1980 with the British and Irish Lions during a period when at club level he was representing Shannon RFC. Tucker was educated at St. Munchin's College in Limerick.

Tucker's death was announced in January 2012. He was 59.
