= Hurling in County Cork =

Hurling in County Cork is administered by the Cork County Board of the Gaelic Athletic Association.

== Clubs ==
Senior Clubs 2013.

- Blackrock National Hurling Club
- Ballymartle
- Sarsfields
- Carrigtwohill
- Bishopstown
- Douglas
- Bride Rovers
- Glen Rovers
- Ballinhassig
- Midleton
- Erins Own
- Newtownshandrum
- Killeagh
- St Finbarrs
- Na Piarsaigh

== County teams ==
The Cork senior hurling team represents Cork in the National Hurling League and the All-Ireland Senior Hurling Championship. There are also Cork intermediate hurling team|intermediate, Cork junior hurling team|junior, Cork under-21 hurling team|under-21 and Cork minor hurling team|minor teams.
