= Conrad O'Sullivan =

- Born: 13 February 1981 Cork, Ireland
- Died: 22 March 2006 (aged 25)
- School: Presentation Brothers College
- University: University College Cork
- Notable relative: Mick O'Driscoll (cousin)

Rugby union career
- Position(s): Centre, Fly-half
Amateur team(s)
Years	Team	Apps	(Points)
- Dolphin
–	Cork Constitution		
Senior career
Years	Team	Apps	(Points)
2003–2004	Munster	7	(9)
International career
Years	Team	Apps	(Points)
- Ireland Schools
–	Ireland U21		

Conrad O'Sullivan (13 February 1981 – 23 March 2006) was an Irish rugby union player.

== Life ==
Born in Cork, O'Sullivan first began playing rugby for local club Dolphin's under-10 side. He attended Presentation Brothers College, representing the school in the Munster Schools Senior Cup, before progressing to University College Cork and then joining Cork Constitution in the amateur All-Ireland League, whom he would go on to captain.

Having previously played for Munster at under-20 level, O'Sullivan was drafted in to play fly-half in Munster's pre-season friendly against Connacht on 29 August 2003, despite having previously played as a centre. Munster won 38–12, though O'Sullivan was injured in the game, which prevented him from making his senior competitive debut for the province until their game Neath-Swansea Ospreys on 27 September 2003.

Internationally, O'Sullivan represented Ireland Schools and Ireland under-21s. He died by suicide in March 2006.
