= David Pusey =

- Born: David Pusey; 28 January 1979 (age 47) Sydney, Australia
- Height: 6 ft 5 in (196 cm)
- Weight: 242 lb (110 kg)
- School: Newington College

Rugby union career
- Position(s): Flanker, Number Eight
Senior career
Years	Team	Apps	(Points)
- Munster Rugby
Super Rugby
Years	Team	Apps	(Points)
- Brumbies
–	Western Force		
International career
Years	Team	Apps	(Points)
- Australian Schools and Under 21

David Pusey (born 28 January 1979 in Sydney, New South Wales) is a retired Australian rugby union footballer who played for the Brumbies and Western Force in the Super 14 competition and for Munster Rugby. He was educated at Newington College (1987–1996), is an Australian Schools and Under 21 international and is now a commercial helicopter pilot.
