= Ian Murray (rugby union) =

- Born: 17 January 1970 (age 56) Cork, Ireland
- Height: 1.80 m (5 ft 11 in)
- Weight: 105 kg (16.5 st; 231 lb)

Rugby union career
- Position: Prop
Amateur team(s)
Years	Team	Apps	(Points)
- Cork Constitution
Senior career
Years	Team	Apps	(Points)
1996–1999	Munster	32	(15)

Ian Murray (born 17 January 1970) is an Irish former rugby union player and coach.

== Career ==
From Cork, McCarthy represented local amateur club Cork Constitution during his career, playing in the newly formed All-Ireland League in the 1990s, and also played for Munster between 1996 and 1999, featuring for the province in the IRFU Interprovincial Championship and Heineken Cup. After retiring from playing rugby, the former prop entered coaching, becoming scrum coach to Munster's underage teams.
