= Eugene McGovern =

- Born: Eugene McGovern; 25 May 1982 (age 44) Limerick, Ireland, raised in Limerick
- Height: 1.85 m (6 ft 1 in)
- Weight: 17 st 7 lb (245 lb; 111 kg)
- School: Crescent College
- University: Setanta College

Rugby union career
- Position: Prop
- Current team: none
Provincial / State sides
Years	Team	Apps	(Points)
2002-2008	Munster	13	
International career
Years	Team	Apps	(Points)
2002	Ireland Schools, Ireland U19’s, Ireland U21		

Eugene McGovern (born 25 May 1982) is an Irish rugby union player, playing in the prop position. He played for Munster from 2002 until 2007, making his debut for Munster against Newport Gwent Dragons in October 2003. From Limerick, McGovern was educated at Crescent College.
