= Mossy Lawler =

Irish rugby union coach

- Born: 5 April 1980 (age 46) Limerick, Ireland
- Height: 1.75 m (5 ft 9 in)
- School: Ardscoil Rís
- University: Limerick IT; Setanta College
- Notable relative: Craig Casey

Rugby union career
- Position(s): Wing, Fullback, Fly-half, Centre
Amateur team(s)
Years	Team	Apps	(Points)
1998–2008	Shannon		
2009–2012	Shannon		
2012–2015	UL Bohemians		
Senior career
Years	Team	Apps	(Points)
2001–2008	Munster	67	(94)
2008	London Wasps	3	(0)
- Correct as of 14 October 2016
Coaching career
- Years: Team
- 2012–2015: UL Bohemians
- 2015–2021: Connacht Academy
- 2021–2023: Connacht (Attack & skills coach)
- 2023–: Munster (Skills coach)

Mossy Lawler (born 5 April 1980) is an Irish former rugby union player who currently works as a coach. He primarily played as a wing or fullback, but also covered fly-half and centre. Lawler spent most of his playing career with Munster, playing in the Celtic League and Heineken Cup, and also played three games on a trial period for English Premiership side London Wasps in 2008. After leaving the professional game, he continued to play at amateur level in Ireland for Shannon and UL Bohemians, before retiring fully in 2015.

== Early life ==
Lawler grew up in Limerick. His father Pat died while playing rugby when Lawler was just three years old. His father had played for UL Bohemians from the mid-1960s to the mid-1970s, and Lawler started out in rugby with the same club. Lawler went to secondary school in Ardscoil Rís in the city, and played rugby for the school team. He was part of the first team from the school to reach the final of the Munster Schools Senior Cup, where they were beaten by PBC Cork. After leaving secondary school, Lawler went on to study at Limerick IT, completing a construction studies course.

== Playing career ==
=== Early career with Shannon ===
Having played at youth level with UL Bohemians, Lawler moved to cross-city rivals Shannon at the age of 18, having been convinced to move by his cousin, Colm Tucker. He made his debut in the All-Ireland League for the club at that age, and played for them while studying in Limerick IT. Lawler was given a professional contract with Munster the summer after he finished his college course. Lawler remained associated with Shannon throughout his time with the province, playing for the side occasionally when available.

=== Munster ===
Lawler made his competitive debut for Munster on 11 September 2001, in a game against Welsh side Caerphilly. Munster reached the Heineken Cup final in his first season with the side, but he didn't feature in the competition. Lawler did however play the following season, featuring in the "Miracle Match" against Gloucester. Munster needed to win by 27 points, with four clear tries between the sides, to qualify from the pool stages of the 2002–03 Heineken Cup. Lawler started on the wing and scored a try as Munster won 33–6 in front of a delirious Thomond Park.

Lawler was part of the squad that won the province's first Heineken Cup in 2006. He had played for the team in the pool stages, but missed the quarter-final through injury and never regained his place in the team. In the 2006–07 season Lawler's playing time was limited, as he made ten Celtic League appearances, six of them coming as a replacement, and didn't feature in Europe. He then missed the entirety of the 2007–08 season through injury, as Munster won their second Heineken Cup. Lawler's contract wasn't renewed at the end of the season.

=== Wasps ===
Having left Munster at the end of the 2007–08 season, Lawler was without a club. In October 2008, English Premiership team London Wasps invited him to join the club on a three-month contract. His fellow Munster natives Jeremy Staunton, Eoin Reddan and Damien Varley were playing with the team at the time. After making two appearances in the Premiership for the side, Lawler tore his groin in a game against Sale Sharks, which brought his time with Wasps to an end.

=== Return to amateur rugby ===
After his disappointment with Wasps, Lawler gave up on a professional career, instead rejoining Shannon for the 2009–10 season, and he played for the side for three seasons. At the end of the 2011–12 season, he opted to rejoin UL Bohemians, the club where he had first played in his youth. Again Lawler's cousin Colm Tucker, who had first persuaded him to join Shannon in the 1990s, was key to the switch. Lawler joined Bohemians as a player, but also served as the club's director of rugby, with a focus on developing the club's academy. This added coaching role was key in his decision to move. Lawler retired from playing at the end of the 2014–15 campaign, having played at senior level for 17 seasons.

== Coaching ==
After retiring from playing rugby, Lawler joined the Connacht Academy staff as an elite player development officer, with a focus on developing the backs. He also served as head coach of the province's under-20 side and the second tier team, the Connacht Eagles. Ahead of the 2021–22 season, Lawlor joined Connacht's senior staff as their attack and skills coach. Lawlor will return to Munster as their skills coach from the 2023–24 season.
