= Conor Mahony =

Irish rugby union player

- Born: 1974 (age 51–52) Cork, Ireland
- Notable relative: Cian Mahony (brother)

Rugby union career
- Position: Centre
Amateur team(s)
Years	Team	Apps	(Points)
- Cork Constitution
–	Clontarf		
Senior career
Years	Team	Apps	(Points)
c.1997–2001	Munster	25	(125)

Conor Mahony is an Irish former rugby union player.

== Career ==
Mahony played for amateur side Cork Constitution in the All-Ireland League, and was a Munster squad member alongside brother Cian, making at least twenty five appearances for the province during his career their. In 2002, work commitments took Mahony to Dublin, where he joined Clontarf.
