= John O'Neill (rugby union, born 1973) =

- Born: 18 September 1973 (age 53) Ballina, County Mayo, Ireland
- Height: 1.88 m (6 ft 2 in)
- Weight: 104 kg (16.4 st; 229 lb)

Rugby union career
- Position: Wing
Amateur team(s)
Years	Team	Apps	(Points)
- Highfield
–	Sundays Well		
–	Shannon		
–	Midleton		
Senior career
Years	Team	Apps	(Points)
1998–2005	Munster	73	(60)

John O'Neill (born 18 September 1973) is an Irish former rugby union player.

== Career ==
Born in Ballina, O'Neill first began playing rugby for Highfield's underage teams, before joining their senior team at the age of 17. He then joined another Cork club, Sundays Well, where his performances saw him join the Munster squad ahead of the 1998–99 season, going on to play in the 2000 Heineken Cup Final defeat against English side Northampton Saints and again in the inaugural final of the [Celtic league final]in 2001 defeat against Leinster. In 2002 he went on to play against Leicester in the Heineken cup final in the millennium stadium where Munster were defeated again .

He is perhaps best known for scoring the infamous "try that wasn't" in Munster's 16–15 Heineken Cup semi-final defeat against Stade Français in 2001. O'Neill scored a try in the corner to win the game but it was disallowed by the referee, who had judged that the ball had gone into touch before O'Neill grounded it. Despite television replays proving that O'Neill had in fact scored a legitimate try, the video evidence could not be used, as it was only available in the Six Nations at the time. The try would have given Munster the win, but instead Stade hung on for the victory.

O'Neill was called up to the Ireland squad that toured new Zealand in 2002 but he never won any international caps. He retired from rugby due to an ankle injury in July 2004 and has since gone on to become a community rugby officer for the province.
