= Alan Gaffney =

Australian-born rugby coach

Alan Gaffney is an Australian-born rugby coach, currently The National Elite Programmes Coach for Australia

He is a former player who played over 200 games with the Randwick Rugby Club Sydney, of which he was elected a life member in 1993.

Gaffney began his coaching career at Randwick DRUFC in 1984 and remained there until 1996. During his time at the Club he coached the likes of David Campese, the Ella brothers, Phil Kearns and George Gregan. He left to coach at the NSW Waratahs; he remains closely linked with the Randwick Club.

On 1 January 2018 Gaffney joined Northampton Saints as technical coaching consultant. He acted as director of rugby until the end of that season.

Notable coaching successes during his time in Ireland were the winning of the

- Grand Slam of the 2009 Six Nations Championship
- Heineken Cup victory with Leinster Rugby 2009 .
- The great game in the 2011 World Cup when Ireland defeated Australia in the pool rounds
- The Miracle Match, Munster vs Gloucester 2003
