= Garrett Fitzgerald (rugby union) =

Irish rugby union player (1954–2020)

- Born: 14 June 1954 Knockraha, County Cork, Ireland
- Died: 14 February 2020 (aged 65) Cork, Ireland
- School: Christian Brothers College

Rugby union career
- Position: Front-row
Amateur team(s)
Years	Team	Apps	(Points)
- UCC
–	Cork Constitution		

Garrett Fitzgerald (14 June 1954 – 14 February 2020) was an Irish rugby union player and coach, who was CEO of Munster Rugby between 1999 and 2019.

== Life ==
Born in Knockraha, County Cork, Fitzgerald attended Christian Brothers College, Cork and won a Munster Schools Rugby Senior Cup during the 1970s. During an 18-year playing career in rugby union, Fitzgerald played in the front-row for University College Cork R.F.C. and Cork Constitution. In a 19-year coaching career, Fitzgerald coached Christian Brothers College to five Munster Schools Senior Cups, as well as working with Irish Universities, Munster under-20s and UCC. Perhaps his most famous achievement as a coach came in 1992, when he coached Munster to a 22–19 victory against then-world champions Australia in Musgrave Park.

Fitzgerald became Munster's CEO in 1999 and was a driving force behind the province becoming a European powerhouse. He was at the helm for some of the greatest days in the province's history, including their coveted first Heineken Cup success in 2006, followed by a second triumph in 2008, as well as three league triumphs in 2002–03, 2008–09 and 2010–11. He also oversaw the redevelopment of both Thomond Park and Musgrave Park, and the consolidation of Munster's training bases in Cork and Limerick into one base at the University of Limerick.

In June 2019, upon reaching retirement age, Fitzgerald duly retired from his role at Munster. He was, at the time, the longest serving provincial chief executive in Irish rugby. Post-retirement, Fitzgerald was honoured with the Richard Harris Patron's Award at Munster's annual London dinner in September 2019. The award recognises an individual who encapsulates Munster's values, and Fitzgerald was similarly recognised by the Federation of Irish Sport for his contributions. In December 2019, the University of Limerick awarded Fitzgerald an honorary doctorate.

Following a battle with illness, Fitzgerald died on 14 February 2020 at Marymount University Hospital and Hospice, Cork. He is survived by his wife, Áine, and their children Megan, Jamie and Michael. Many ex-colleagues of Fitzgerald's, including former Munster coaches and players, were quick to pay tribute to him. Fitzgerald was posthumously inducted into the Munster Rugby Hall of Fame in November 2020, and, in 2021, the trophy awarded to the winners of the Munster Schools Rugby Senior Cup was renamed the Garrett Fitzgerald Cup in tribute to him.
