= Shaun Payne =

South African rugby union player

- Born: 22 February 1972 (age 54) Cape Town, South Africa
- Height: 1.83 m (6 ft 0 in)
- Weight: 96 kg (212 lb)
- School: Westville Boys High School

Rugby union career
- Position(s): Centre, Wing, Fullback
Senior career
Years	Team	Apps	(Points)
1994–1999	Sharks (Currie Cup)	58	(150)
1998–1999	Sharks	19	(15)
1999–2003	Swansea	22	(10)
2003–2008	Munster	109	(90)
- Correct as of 29 November 2011
National sevens team
Years	Team		Comps
1995–1998	South Africa 7s		4

Shaun Payne (born 2 February 1972 in Cape Town, South Africa) is a South African-born, Irish-qualified retired rugby union player. He qualified to play for Ireland because his grandmother is from Easkey, County Sligo.

== Munster ==
Payne made his debut for Munster in September 2003, against Leinster in a Celtic League game. He scored the first of his 18 tries for Munster against Cardiff Blues in November 2003.

His first silverware with Munster came in May 2005, when Munster beat Llanelli Scarlets 27–16 to win the 2004–2005 Celtic Cup.

He was Munster's fullback when they won their first Heineken Cup, beating Biarritz Olympique 19–23 in the 2006 Heineken Cup Final.

He retired at the end of the 2007–08 season, having been dropped from the Munster team during the knockout-stage of the 2007–08 Heineken Cup. His last appearance for Munster was against Ulster in a Celtic League game in April 2008.

== International ==
Payne was called up to the senior Ireland squad for the 2005 Six Nations Championship.

== Management ==
Payne became Munster Manager in the summer of 2007. He left this post in the summer of 2012 and returned to South Africa.
