= Shannon RFC =

Irish rugby union club, based in Limerick

Shannon
- Full name: Shannon Rugby Football Club
- Union: (Ireland) IRFU
- Branch: Munster
- Nickname(s): The Parish; The Parishmen
- Founded: 1884; 142 years ago
- Region: Limerick
- Ground: Thomond Park (Capacity: 25,100)
- Chairman: Denis O'Driscoll
- President: Frank Sargent
- Coach: Neil Cronin
- Captain: Harry Long
- League: All-Ireland Div. 2A
Team kit

Official website
- shannonrfc.com

Shannon Rugby Football Club is an Irish rugby union club in Limerick, Ireland, named after the city's Shannon river. The club has won the national league a record nine times, and has seen many players progress to prossional rugby, including a number Irish internationals and British and Irish Lions tourists.

The first XV plays in Division 2A of the All-Ireland League, while the women's side compete in Division 1 of the Munster League. Shannon fields underage teams for boys and girls from U6s to U20s. In 2017, the club became the first in the country to field a women's U20 club side.

== History ==
Shannon RFC was founded on 18 February 1884, in the Shamrock Bar on Corbally Road in Limerick. The founding members were Dan Duggan, Richie Gleeson, Pierce Hartney, Joe Hegarty and Paddy Lynch, who was the team's first captain. Stephan Hanrahan was president of the club for the first two years. In 1910, the club affiliated to the Munster branch of the IRFU and competed in the second edition of the Munster Junior Cup.

Shannon remained a junior club for close to 70 years, during which time Shannon supplied numerous players to Garryowen. Shannon won the Munster Junior Cup for the first time in 1914, and won their first Transfield Cup in 1938. In 1940, Shannon won their first Charity Cup, as well as both the Munster Junior Cup and Transfield Cup.

Shannon attained senior status in 1953, becoming Limerick's fifth senior club. In 1960 Shannon won their first Munster Senior Cup, defeating University College Cork in a replay at Thomond Park, having drawn 8-8 the previous week at Musgrave Park, Cork.

In 1990, the IRFU formed the All-Ireland League, with Shannon entering from the Munster Senior League to begin the most successful decades in club history. The club would win four AIL titles in succession between 1994 and 1998, then a further five on the 2000s, as well as ten Munster Senior Cups between 1996 and 2008.

== Grounds ==
Over the years, Shannon have had numerous temporary grounds, including the field at the Island Bank, Gilligan's field, Johnny Cusack's field and Egan's Field in Corbally. The first purchased grounds were 14 acres (57,000 m^{2}) of land at Fir Hill, Gortatogher, (also known as Athlunkard), and were later sold to Corbally United soccer club. Today, Shannon's home grounds are at both Coonagh and Thomond Park.

While still a junior club, Shannon became co-tenants with Bohemians RFC at the Munster branch-owned grounds at famed Thomond Park. In 1967, they completed their own Club Pavilion there, which was extended in 1978 to the size it is today.

== Honours ==
- All-Ireland League
  - 1994–95, 1995–96, 1996–97, 1997–98, 2001–02, 2003–04, 2004–05, 2005–06, 2008-09: 9
  - Division 1B 2017–18, 2021–22
- All-Ireland Cup
  - 2007-08
- Munster Senior Cup
  - 1960, 1977, 1978, 1982, 1986, 1987, 1988, 1991, 1992, 1996, 1998, 1999–00, 2000–01, 2002, 2003, 2004, 2005, 2006, 2007-08: 19
- Munster Junior Cup
  - 1914, 1920, 1924–25, 1939–40, 1954, 1961–62, 1996, 2015: 8
- Munster Senior League
  - 1981, 1986, 1989, 2001–02, 2002–03, 2003–04, 2004-05: 7

== Notable players ==
See also Category:Shannon RFC players

=== Munster ===
Three Shannon players, Brendan Foley, Colm Tucker and Gerry McLoughlin, played for the Munster side that defeated the touring All Blacks 12–0 on 31 October 1978 at Thomond Park. Mick Galwey captained the Munster side when they finished as runners up in the Heineken Cup finals of 2000 and 2002. In the 2005-06 season seven Shannon players, including the captain, Anthony Foley, helped Munster win the Heineken Cup for the first time.

=== Ireland 7s ===
The following Shannon players have played for the Ireland national rugby sevens team:

- Greg O’Shea
- Josh Costello
- Aoife Doyle

=== Ireland ===
The following Shannon players have represented Ireland at full international level.

- Tony Buckley
- Craig Casey
- Sean Cronin
- Ian Dowling
- Mick Fitzgibbon
- Jerry Flannery
- Anthony Foley
- Brendan Foley
- Mick Galwey
- Eddie Halvey
- John Hayes
- Trevor Hogan
- Marcus Horan
- Felix Jones
- Gerry McLoughlin
- Mick Moylett
- Brian O'Brien
- Alan Quinlan
- Niall Ronan
- Donnacha Ryan
- CJ Stander
- Peter Stringer
- Colm Tucker
- Aoife Doyle
- Joy Neville
- Joss Hanrahan
- Olivia Brown
- Jean Lonergan
- Rosie Foley
- Fiona Steed
- Rachel Tucker
- Anmarie McAllister
- Amanda Greensmith
- Denise Tracey

=== British & Irish Lions ===
The following Shannon players have also represented the British & Irish Lions.

- Colm Tucker: 1980
- Gerry McLoughlin: 1983
- Mick Galwey: 1993
- John Hayes: 2005, 2009 (both while registered as a Bruff RFC player).

=== International referees ===
- John Lacey
- Joy Neville
