= 1999–2000 Heineken Cup =

Rugby competition

Tournament details
- Countries: England; France; Ireland; Italy; Scotland; Wales
- Tournament format(s): Round-robin and Knockout
- Date: 19 November 1999 – 27 May 2000

Tournament statistics
- Teams: 24
- Matches played: 79
- Attendance: 626,065 (7,925 per match)
- Top point scorer(s): Ronan O'Gara (Munster) (131 points)
- Top try scorer(s): Christophe Dominici (Stade Français); Conan Sharman (Edinburgh); Chris Wyatt (Llanelli) (5 tries)

Final
- Venue: Twickenham Stadium, London
- Attendance: 68,441
- Champions: (England) Northampton Saints (1st title)
- Runners-up: (Ireland) Munster

The 1999–2000 Heineken Cup was the fifth edition of the Heineken Cup of rugby. Teams from France, Ireland, Italy, Wales, England and Scotland were divided into six pools of four and played home and away matches against each other. The pool winners and two best runners-up qualified for the knockout stages.

== Teams ==
France	England	Wales	Scotland	Ireland	Italy
Stade Français Paris; Toulouse; Bourgoin; Colomiers; Montferrand; Grenoble	Leicester Tigers; Bath; London Wasps; Saracens; Harlequins; Northampton Saints	Swansea; Llanelli; Pontypridd; Cardiff; Neath	Glasgow Caledonians; Edinburgh Reivers	Leinster; Munster; Ulster	Petrarca; Benetton Treviso

== Pool stage ==
In the pool matches teams received

- 2 points for a win
- 1 points for a draw

=== Pool 1 ===
Team	P	W	D	L	Tries for	Tries against	Try diff	Points for	Points against	Points diff	Pts
(France) Stade Français Paris	6	4	0	2	22	9	13	192	109	83	8
(Ireland) Leinster	6	4	0	2	12	17	−5	150	138	12	8
(Scotland) Glasgow Caledonians	6	2	0	4	14	23	−9	130	179	−49	4
(England) Leicester Tigers	6	2	0	4	12	11	1	127	173	−46	4

=== Pool 2 ===
Team	P	W	D	L	Tries for	Tries against	Try diff	Points for	Points against	Points diff	Pts
(France) Toulouse	6	5	0	1	24	5	19	200	73	127	10
(England) Bath	6	4	0	2	15	8	7	170	80	90	8
(Wales) Swansea	6	3	0	3	14	13	1	126	137	−11	6
(Italy) Petrarca	6	0	0	6	11	38	−27	76	282	−206	0

=== Pool 3 ===
Team	P	W	D	L	Tries for	Tries against	Try diff	Points for	Points against	Points diff	Pts
(Wales) Llanelli	6	5	0	1	17	8	9	152	86	66	10
(England) London Wasps	6	5	0	1	16	9	7	163	99	64	10
(France) Bourgoin	6	2	0	4	14	14	0	140	162	−22	4
(Ireland) Ulster	6	0	0	6	4	20	−16	71	179	−108	0

=== Pool 4 ===
Team	P	W	D	L	Tries for	Tries against	Try diff	Points for	Points against	Points diff	Pts
(Ireland) Munster	6	5	0	1	19	14	5	188	132	56	10
(England) Saracens	6	3	0	3	24	15	9	206	153	53	6
(France) Colomiers	6	2	0	4	13	20	−7	144	194	−50	4
(Wales) Pontypridd	6	2	0	4	13	20	−7	106	165	−59	4

=== Pool 5 ===
Team	P	W	D	L	Tries for	Tries against	Try diff	Points for	Points against	Points diff	Pts
(Wales) Cardiff	6	4	1	1	14	13	1	168	141	27	9
(France) Montferrand	6	4	0	2	19	6	13	154	85	69	8
(Italy) Benetton Treviso	6	2	0	4	6	16	−10	100	167	−67	4
(England) Harlequins	6	1	1	4	8	12	−4	120	149	−29	3

=== Pool 6 ===
Team	P	W	D	L	Tries for	Tries against	Try diff	Points for	Points against	Points diff	Pts
(England) Northampton Saints	6	5	0	1	19	7	12	184	87	97	10
(France) Grenoble	6	3	0	3	13	15	−2	110	140	−30	6
(Scotland) Edinburgh Reivers	6	3	0	3	13	19	−6	112	158	−46	6
(Wales) Neath	6	1	0	5	13	17	−4	128	149	−21	2

== Seeding ==
Seed	Pool winners	Pts	TF	+/−
1	(France) Toulouse	10	24	+127
2	(England) Northampton Saints	10	19	+97
3	(Ireland) Munster	10	19	+56
4	(Wales) Llanelli	10	17	+66
5	(Wales) Cardiff	9	14	+27
6	(France) Stade Français Paris	8	22	+83
Seed	Pool runners-up	Pts	TF	+/−
7	(England) London Wasps	10	16	+64
8	(France) Montferrand	8	19	+69
—	(England) Bath	8	15	+90
—	(Ireland) Leinster	8	12	+12
—	(England) Saracens	6	24	+53
—	(France) Grenoble	6	13	−30

== Knockout stage ==
=== Quarter-finals ===
15 April 2000
13:00

Munster (Ireland)	27–10	(France) Stade Français Paris
	Report

Thomond Park, Limerick
Attendance: 13,400
Referee: Steve Lander (England)

15 April 2000
15:00

Llanelli (Wales)	22–3	(Wales) Cardiff
	Report

Stradey Park, Llanelli
Attendance: 11,000
Referee: Didier Mené (France)

15 April 2000
16:15

Toulouse (France)	31–18	(France) Montferrand
	Report

Stade Municipal, Toulouse
Attendance: 37,000
Referee: Ian Ramage (Scotland)

16 April 2000
15:00

Northampton Saints (England)	25–22	(England) London Wasps
	Report

Franklin's Gardens, Northampton
Attendance: 9,685
Referee: Clayton Thomas (Wales)

=== Semi-finals ===
6 May 2000
15:45

Toulouse (France)	25–31	(Ireland) Munster
	Report

Stade Chaban-Delmas, Bordeaux
Attendance: 28,000
Referee: Jim Fleming (Scotland)

7 May 2000
15:00

Northampton Saints (England)	31–28	(Wales) Llanelli
	Report

Madejski Stadium, Reading
Attendance: 15,118
Referee: Alan Lewis (Ireland)

=== Final ===
27 May 2000
15:00

Northampton Saints (England)	9–8	(Ireland) Munster
Pen: Grayson (3)	Report	Try: Wallace; Drop: Holland

Twickenham Stadium, London
Attendance: 68,441
Referee: Joël Dumé (France)
