= Mick O'Driscoll =

Irish rugby union player

- Born: Michael Rowan O'Driscoll; 8 October 1978 (age 48) Cork, Ireland
- Height: 1.96 m (6 ft 5 in)
- Weight: 113 kg (17.8 st; 249 lb)
- School: Presentation Brothers College
- University: University College Cork
- Notable relative(s): Audrey O'Flynn (cousin); Conrad O'Sullivan (cousin)

Rugby union career
- Position: Lock
Amateur team(s)
| Years | Team | Apps | (Points) |
- UCC
| – | Cork Constitution | | |
Senior career
| Years | Team | Apps | (Points) |
| 1998–2003 | Munster | 50 | (10) |
| 2003–2005 | Perpignan | 35 | |
| 2005–2012 | Munster | 157 | (20) |
- Correct as of 12 May 2012
International career
| Years | Team | Apps | (Points) |
| 2000–2011 | Ireland A | 16 | (5) |
| 2001–2011 | Ireland | 23 | (0) |
| 2012 | Barbarians | 2 | (0) |
- Correct as of 2 June 2012

Michael Rowan O'Driscoll (born 8 October 1978) is an Irish former rugby union player. He played for Munster in the Pro12 and Heineken Cup, and played internationally for Ireland. He was an integral senior player for Munster and captained the province numerous times, particularly during the 2008–09 season.

== Early life ==
O'Driscoll attended Presentation Brothers College, Cork and was in the same class as Peter Stringer. He also won a schools rugby medal in 1996. He also played GAA at underage level with Éire Óg in Cork. His compatriot and former Leinster centre, Brian O'Driscoll, is no relation.

== Munster ==
He made his Munster debut in 1998 against Neath. During his professional career, O'Driscoll has also played for USA Perpignan in France. Mostly a second-row in his time in Ireland, he often played in the back-row in France. He returned to Munster in 2005 and became an important member of the Munster squad. He won the Munster Player of the Year award for the 2009/10 season. O'Driscoll became the eighth Munster player to win 200 caps for the province on 3 March 2012, during a league game against Newport Gwent Dragons.

It was announced on 17 April 2012 that O'Driscoll would be retiring from international and national rugby at the end of the 2011–12 season. His last game for the province was the away league play-off semi-final against Ospreys on 11 May 2012, which Munster lost 45-10.

It was announced on 10 April 2014 that O'Driscoll would be joining Munster's coaching staff from 1 July 2014 as a Technical Advisor. O'Driscoll will also be responsible for Munster A team.

== Ireland ==
His international debut came as a replacement against Romania in 2001. O'Driscoll won 23 caps for Ireland, the last of which came against Scotland in the 2011 Rugby World Cup warm-ups. He was a member of Ireland's 2009 Grand Slam winning team. He was selected in Ireland's 2011 World Cup training squad for the warm-up tests in August, but was not selected in the final 30-man squad for the World Cup and never played for his country again.

== Statistics ==
=== International analysis by opposition ===
| Against | Played | Won | Lost | Drawn | Tries | Points | % Won |
|---|---|---|---|---|---|---|---|
| Argentina | 3 | 1 | 2 | 0 | 0 | 0 | 33.33 |
| Australia | 2 | 0 | 2 | 0 | 0 | 0 | 0 |
| Canada | 1 | 1 | 0 | 0 | 0 | 0 | 100 |
| England | 2 | 1 | 1 | 0 | 0 | 0 | 50 |
| Fiji | 1 | 1 | 0 | 0 | 0 | 0 | 100 |
| France | 1 | 0 | 1 | 0 | 0 | 0 | 0 |
| Italy | 2 | 2 | 0 | 0 | 0 | 0 | 100 |
| New Zealand | 4 | 0 | 4 | 0 | 0 | 0 | 0 |
| Romania | 2 | 2 | 0 | 0 | 0 | 0 | 100 |
| Scotland | 2 | 1 | 1 | 0 | 0 | 0 | 50 |
| South Africa | 1 | 0 | 1 | 0 | 0 | 0 | 0 |
| United States | 1 | 1 | 0 | 0 | 0 | 0 | 100 |
| Wales | 1 | 1 | 0 | 0 | 0 | 0 | 100 |
| Total | 23 | 11 | 12 | 0 | 0 | 0 | 47.83 |

Correct as of 5 July 2017
