= Jeremy Staunton =

Irish rugby union player

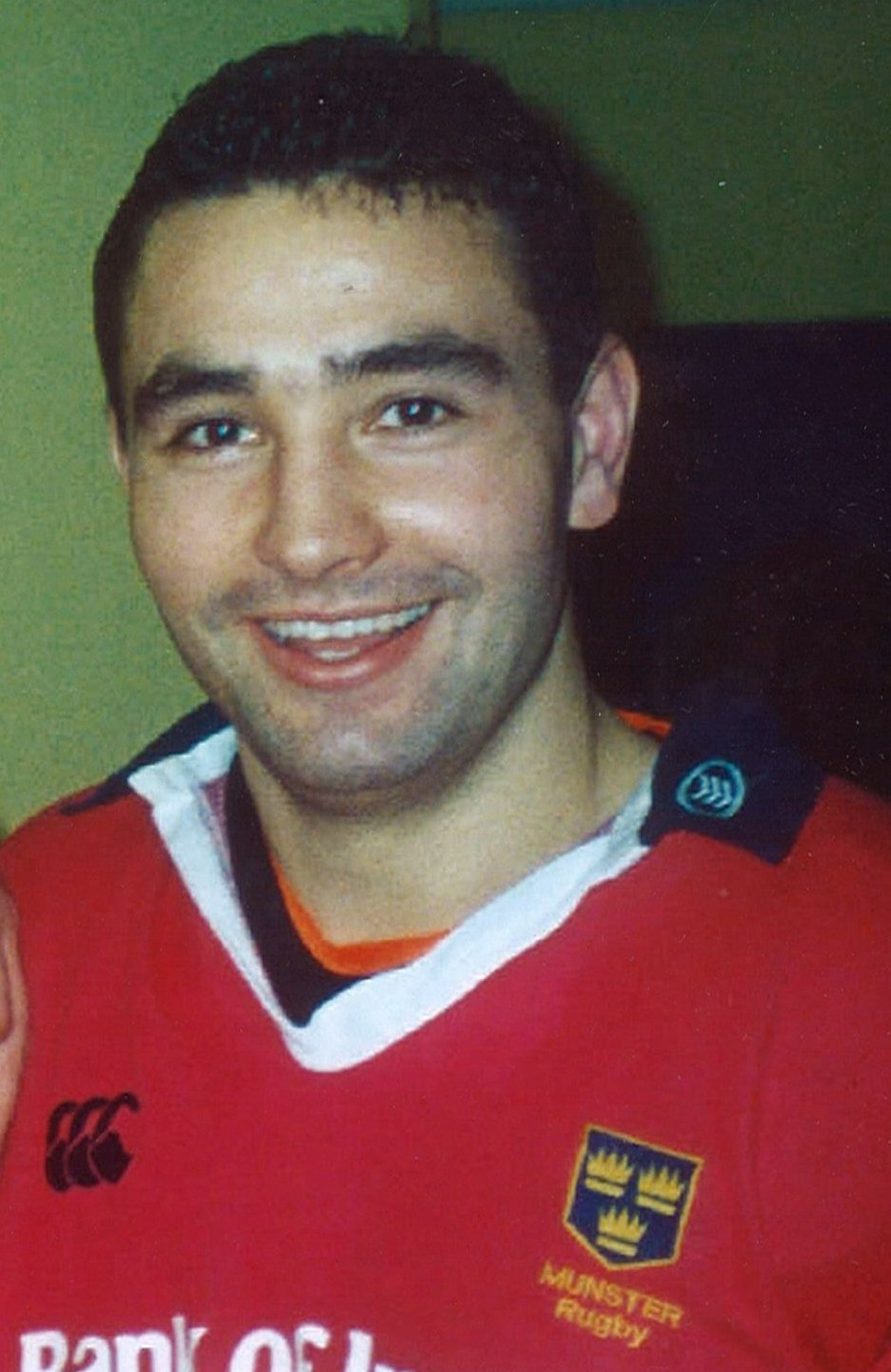
- Staunton in 2012
- Born: Jeremy Staunton; 7 May 1980 (age 46) Limerick, Ireland
- Height: 1.85 m (6 ft 1 in)
- Weight: 95 kg (14 st 13 lb)
- School: St Munchin's College
- University: University of Limerick

Rugby union career
- Position: Fly-half Fullback
Amateur team(s)
Years	Team	Apps	(Points)
- Garryowen
Senior career
Years	Team	Apps	(Points)
1999–2004	Munster	58	(354)
2004-2005	Harlequins	25	(212)
2005-2009	Wasps	53	(184)
2007	→ London Irish (loan)	6	(21)
2009-2012	Leicester Tigers	55	(328)
1999–2012	Total	197	(1,099)
International career
Years	Team	Apps	(Points)
1999–2007	Ireland A	14	(109)
2001–2007	Ireland	5	(21)

Jeremy Staunton (born 7 May 1980) is an Irish rugby union fly-half and Fullback, having retired in 2012 while playing for English club Leicester Tigers in the top level of English rugby, the English Premiership. He has also played at every level for Ireland.

He was educated at St Munchin's College Limerick and University of Limerick.

Staunton began his rugby career with his local team Galbally RFC in County Limerick, Ireland. Later, he played for Garryowen Football Club in the All-Ireland League before earning a contract with Munster in 1999, at the age of 19. He enjoyed five successful seasons with Munster, playing in both the fly-half and full back positions, helping Munster to win the Celtic League in February 2002. Seeing his opportunities limited behind Ronan O'Gara he joined Harlequins in the summer of 2004 before moving on to London Wasps in the summer of 2005. He was part of the Wasps side that won the Powergen Anglo-Welsh cup in 2006, the Heineken Cup in 2007 and the English Premiership in 2008, beating Leicester. He then joined Leicester in the summer of 2009 where he proved a very successful signing and helped to win two further Aviva Premiership titles for the club, playing in the 2010 final, as well as the LV Cup in March 2012 shortly before his retirement.

Staunton earned his first Irish cap on 11 November 2001 against Samoa, scoring a try on his debut international appearance. He earned a further two caps on the Irish tour to Japan in 2005 and also toured New Zealand and Australia with Ireland in June 2006, earning another cap. In June 2007, prior to the Rugby World Cup, he started at Fly-half for Ireland on their tour of Argentina.

Staunton taught at Denstone College in 2015 but is now a teacher of Mathematics and Technical Graphics in Castleknock College County Dublin.
