= Anthony Foley =

Irish rugby union player (1973–2016)

Anthony Gerard Foley
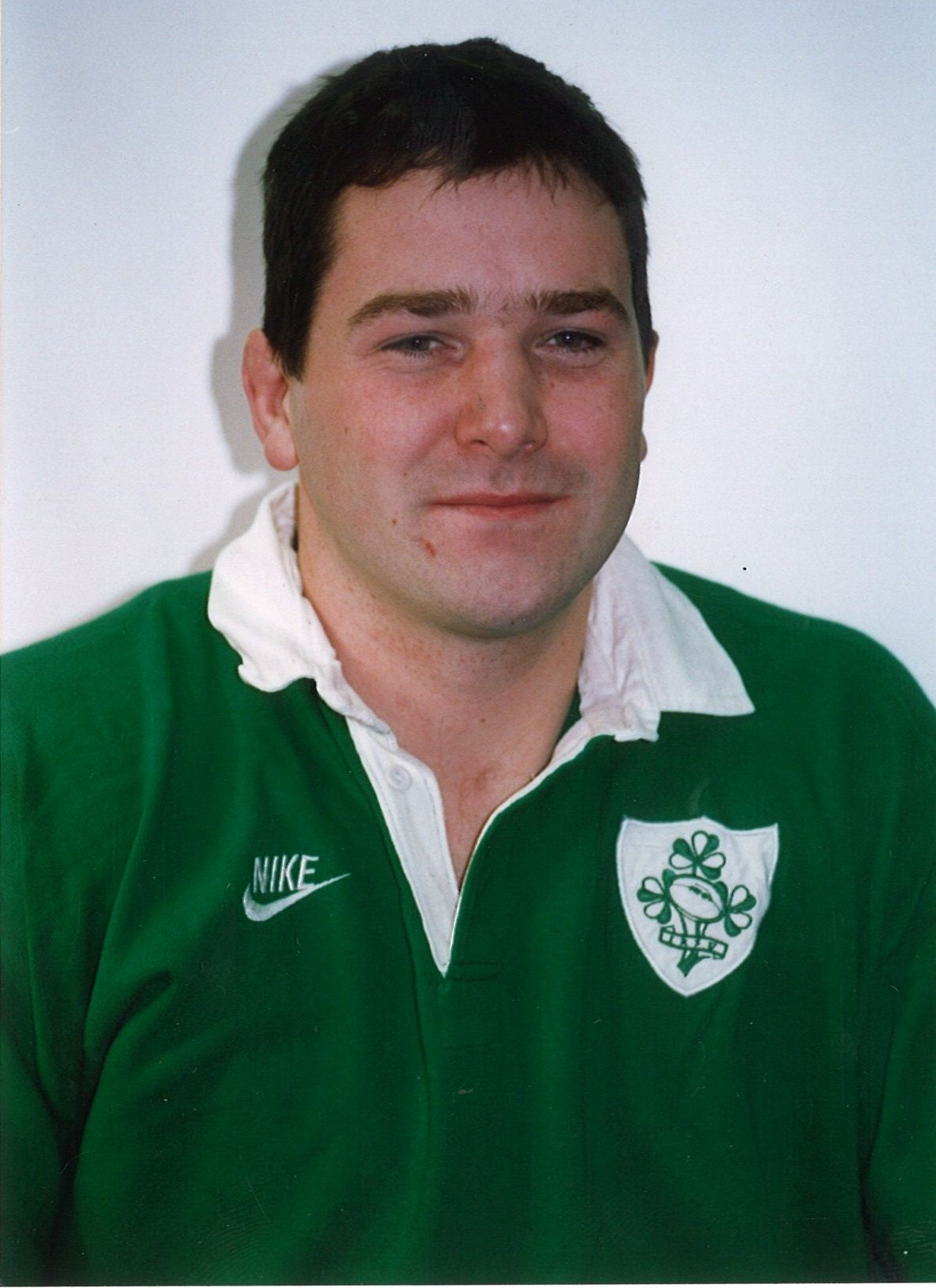
- Foley in his early Ireland days
- Born: Anthony Gerard Foley; 30 October 1973 Limerick, Ireland
- Died: 16 October 2016 (aged 42) Suresnes, France
- Height: 1.91 m (6 ft 3 in)
- Weight: 111 kg (17.5 st; 245 lb)
- School: St Munchin's College
- Notable relative: Brendan Foley (father)

Rugby union career
- Position(s): Number 8, Flanker
Amateur team(s)
Years	Team	Apps	(Points)
1992–2007	Shannon	88	(95)
Senior career
Years	Team	Apps	(Points)
1995–2008	Munster	201	(195)
International career
Years	Team	Apps	(Points)
1995–2005	Ireland	62	(25)
Coaching career
- Years: Team
- 2011–2014: Munster (Forwards Coach)
- 2014–2016: Munster (Head Coach)

Anthony Gerard Foley (30 October 1973 – 16 October 2016) was an Irish rugby union player and head coach of Munster. He was attached to the same squad during his professional playing career. He was a member of the Munster team that won the 2002–03 Celtic League and was the winning captain during their 2005–06 Heineken Cup success. Foley played for Ireland from 1995 until 2005 and captained the squad on three occasions.

== Schools rugby ==
In March 1989, Foley led St. Munchin's College to victory in the Munster Schools Junior Cup. He later represented Munster and Ireland Schools on several occasions over two seasons, notably during the 1992 Irish Schools tour of New Zealand. Winning six games out of eight, Ireland narrowly lost the final game to a New Zealand side featuring Jonah Lomu at number 8. A controversial Jeff Wilson penalty-goal won the game in the final minutes.

== Club career ==
Foley made his professional debut for Munster against Swansea in November 1995, a game that was also Munster's first ever Heineken Cup fixture. He was in the Munster team that lost 8–9 to Northampton Saints in the 2000 Heineken Cup Final, and was again the runner-up when Munster lost 15–9 to Leicester Tigers in the 2002 Heineken Cup Final. Foley was finally on the winning side when Munster won the 2002–03 Celtic League.

When Mick Galwey resigned as Munster captain, Foley narrowly lost to Jim Williams in a vote to decide the next captain. When Williams left Munster in 2005, Foley became the new captain, and in his first season in the position, he led Munster to victory over Biarritz Olympique in the 2006 Heineken Cup Final. Foley had played in all but one of Munster's first 78 Heineken Cup games until a shoulder injury sustained during Munster's 21–19 victory over Leicester Tigers at Welford Road in their first game of the 2006–07 Heineken Cup caused him to miss his side's subsequent victory over Bourgoin, as well as back-to-back games against Cardiff in December 2006.

He stood down as captain at the beginning of the 2007–08 season, making way for Paul O'Connell. He was dropped for Munster's final fixtures of the 2007–08 Heineken Cup, and announced his retirement for the end of the season.

== International career ==
Foley made his debut for Ireland against England in the 1995 Five Nations Championship on 21 January 1995. He scored a try on his debut in an 8-20 defeat. He went to the 1995 Rugby World Cup in South Africa, and played as a replacement in one pool game against Japan which Ireland won 50-28. He missed the 1999 Rugby World Cup, but was selected for the 2003 Rugby World Cup, featuring in two of the pool games against Romania and Australia.

Foley captained Ireland three times: in 2001 against Samoa, and in 2002 against Romania and Georgia. His last international was against Wales in the 2005 Six Nations. In total Foley played in 62 matches for Ireland and scored 5 tries against England in 1995, Romania in 2001, Fiji in 2002, France in 2004, and Wales in 2004.

== Coaching career ==
In March 2011, it was announced that Foley would take over as Munster forwards coach at the end of the 2011 season. He temporarily replaced Gert Smal as Ireland's forwards coach during the 2012 Six Nations Championship, after Smal was forced to miss the remainder of the tournament with an eye condition. Foley signed a contract extension with Munster in May 2013. The following year it was announced that Foley would succeed Rob Penney as Munster's head coach, signing a two-year contract that began on 1 July 2014.

== Personal life and death ==
He was married to Olive; the couple had two children. His father Brendan Foley and sister Rosie Foley also played rugby for Ireland. Foley played Gaelic football for his local GAA club Smith O'Briens in the parish of Killaloe, County Clare. He lined out for Smith O'Briens GAA club in a Munster junior club football semi-final in 2010. He played inter-county hurling for Clare at underage level alongside former Munster rugby player Keith Wood.

Foley was nicknamed 'Axel', after the Beverly Hills Cop character.

Foley died in his sleep on 16 October 2016, while staying at a hotel in the Paris suburb of Suresnes with the Munster squad; heart disease had caused an acute pulmonary edema. The team was preparing to face Racing 92 in its opening game of the 2016–17 European Rugby Champions Cup. The match was postponed as a result of Foley's death. President Michael D. Higgins and then-Taoiseach Enda Kenny made tributes to Foley, and the Irish flag flew at half mast at government buildings in Munster.

Foley was brought home to Ireland on Wednesday 19 October 2016. His funeral took place on Friday 21 October 2016 at St Flannan's Church in Killaloe, County Clare.

On 22 October 2016, in the first game after Foley's death, Munster beat Glasgow 38–17 at a sold-out Thomond Park. Tributes were paid to Foley before, during and after the game and the number 8 jersey was retired for the game, with CJ Stander wearing the number 24 for the occasion. Before their historic first ever win against New Zealand in Soldier Field, Chicago on 5 November 2016, the senior Irish men's team paid tribute to Foley by forming a figure of 8, led by Munster's CJ Stander, Simon Zebo, Conor Murray and Donnacha Ryan, to face the All Blacks' haka. Ahead of a game against Munster on 11 November 2016, the Māori All Blacks team paid tribute to Foley by placing a jersey with his initials on the halfway line before performing a haka. Māori captain Ash Dixon then presented the jersey to Foley's sons. Munster went on to win the historic game 27–14. On 7 January 2017, further tributes were paid to Foley when the rescheduled Round 1 fixture between Racing 92 and Munster took place. At Ireland's World Cup Quarter Final match against the All Blacks on 14 October 2023 the team again formed a figure of eight when they faced the haka in tribute to Foley.

== Legacy ==
To honour Foley's memory and contribution to European rugby, the EPCR announced that the 2016–17 European Player of the Year would receive the Anthony Foley Memorial Trophy. The trophy was commissioned with the agreement of the Foley family and Munster Rugby and it is envisaged that it will be presented to all future European Player of the Year winners. In June 2017, a monument to Foley was unveiled in Limerick. In September 2017, Foley was posthumously awarded the Richard Harris Patrons' Award at the annual Munster Rugby London Dinner. The award recognises an individual who encapsulated the values of Munster and was presented to Foley's parents. Over €39,000 in proceeds from the special commemorative programme sold for Munster's match against Glasgow Warriors on 22 October 2016 was raised and donated to various good causes. He was posthumously inducted into the Munster hall of fame during the 2018 Munster Rugby Awards. Tributes were made to Foley on the fifth anniversary of his passing in October 2021. Munster played hosts to provincial rivals Connacht on the day itself, with Connacht's captain Jack Carty presenting a special "Axel 8" jersey to Munster captain Peter O'Mahony before kick-off.

== Statistics ==
=== International analysis by opposition ===
Against	Played	Won	Lost	Drawn	Tries	Points	% Won
Argentina	3	2	1	0	0	0	66.67
Australia	3	1	2	0	0	0	33.33
Canada	1	0	0	1	0	0	0
England	8	3	5	0	1	5	37.5
Fiji	1	1	0	0	1	5	100
France	7	3	4	0	1	5	42.86
Georgia	1	1	0	0	0	0	100
Italy	8	6	2	0	0	0	75
Japan	2	2	0	0	0	0	100
New Zealand	3	0	3	0	0	0	0
Romania	3	3	0	0	1	5	100
Russia	1	1	0	0	0	0	100
Samoa	1	1	0	0	0	0	100
Scotland	7	5	2	0	0	0	71.43
South Africa	4	1	3	0	0	0	25
United States	1	1	0	0	0	0	100
Wales	8	6	2	0	1	5	75
Total	62	37	24	1	5	25	59.68

Correct as of 5 July 2017

== Honours ==
=== Shannon ===
- All-Ireland League:
  - Winner (5):1994–95, 1995–96, 1996–97, 1997–98, 2001–02

=== Munster ===
- Heineken Cup:
  - Winner (2): 2005–06, 2007–08
- Celtic League:
  - Winner (1): 2002–03
- Celtic Cup:
  - Winner (1): 2005

=== Ireland ===
- Triple Crown:
  - Winner (1): 2004

=== Individual ===
Awards

- RTÉ Sports Hall of Fame Award: 2016
- Munster Rugby Hall of Fame: 2018
