= Jason Holland (rugby union) =

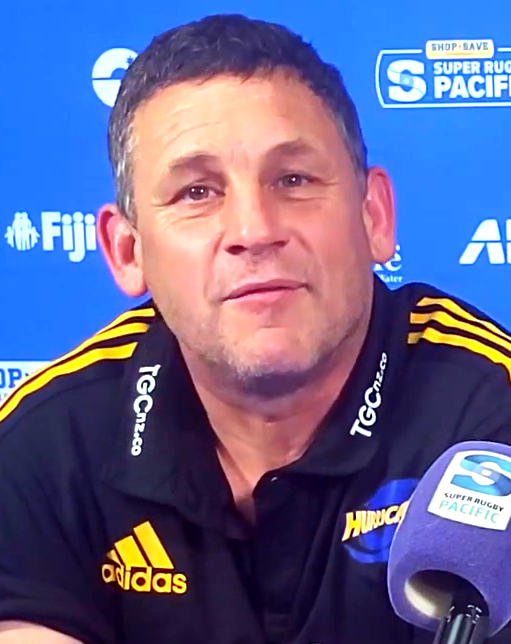
- Full name: Jason John Holland
- Born: 12 August 1972 (age 54) New Plymouth, New Zealand
- Height: 175 cm (5 ft 9 in)
- Weight: 93 kg (205 lb; 14 st 9 lb)
- School: New Plymouth Boys' High School
- University: Massey University

Rugby union career
- Position(s): First five-eighth, Centre
- Current team: Hurricanes
Senior career
Years	Team	Apps	(Points)
1991–1996	Manawatu	65	(641)
1997–1998	Taranaki	23	(259)
1999–2008	Munster	102	(169)
- Correct as of 18 June 2024
International career
Years	Team	Apps	(Points)
2001	Ireland A	1	(0)
- Correct as of 18 June 2024
Coaching career
- Years: Team
- 2008–2012: Munster (assistant)
- 2012–2015: Canterbury (assistant)
- 2015–2019: Hurricanes (assistant)
- 2020–2024: Hurricanes
- 2024–: New Zealand (assistant)
- Correct as of 18 June 2024

Jason John Holland (born 12 August 1972) is a New Zealand rugby union coach and former player, who played for Munster from 1999 until 2008, usually as a centre. Holland played in two Heineken Cup finals in 2000 where he scored from a drop-goal, and 2002, and won 102 Munster caps in total. He also worked as Munster backs coach in 2008. Holland also represented the Ireland A team.

Holland returned to his native New Zealand in 2012 to become assistant coach to Canterbury in the ITM Cup before moving to the assistant coach post at the Hurricanes in Super Rugby. He became the Hurricanes' head coach in December 2019. Holland joined the All Blacks' coaching staff in 2024, assisting new head coach Scott Robertson.
