= 2009–10 Munster Rugby season =

- Ground(s): Thomond Park (Capacity: 26,500); Musgrave Park (Capacity: 8,500)
- CEO: Garrett Fitzgerald
- Coach: Tony McGahan
- Captain: Paul O'Connell
- League: Celtic League
- 2009–10: 4th, semi-finals

The 2009–10 Munster Rugby season was Munster's ninth season competing in the Celtic League, alongside which they also competed in the Heineken Cup. It was Tony McGahan's second season as Director of Rugby.

== 2009–10 squad ==
Note: Flags indicate national union under World Rugby eligibility rules. Players may hold more than one non-World Rugby nationality.

Player	Position	Union
Denis Fogarty	Hooker	Ireland
Jerry Flannery	Hooker	Ireland
Damien Varley	Hooker	Ireland
Julien Brugnaut	Prop	France
Tony Buckley	Prop	Ireland
John Hayes	Prop	Ireland
Marcus Horan	Prop	Ireland
Darragh Hurley	Prop	Ireland
Wian du Preez	Prop	South Africa
Dave Ryan	Prop	Ireland
Billy Holland	Lock	Ireland
Donncha O'Callaghan	Lock	Ireland
Paul O'Connell (c)	Lock	Ireland
Mick O'Driscoll	Lock	Ireland
Donnacha Ryan	Lock	Ireland
Tommy O'Donnell	Back row	Ireland
Alan Quinlan	Back row	Ireland
Niall Ronan	Back row	Ireland
David Wallace	Back row	Ireland
James Coughlan	Back row	Ireland
Denis Leamy	Back row	Ireland
Nick Williams	Back row	New Zealand

Player	Position	Union
Toby Morland	Scrum-half	New Zealand
Tomás O'Leary	Scrum-half	Ireland
Peter Stringer	Scrum-half	Ireland
Duncan Williams	Scrum-half	Ireland
Declan Cusack	Fly-half	Ireland
Jeremy Manning	Fly-half	Ireland
Ronan O'Gara	Fly-half	Ireland
Jean de Villiers	Centre	South Africa
Tom Gleeson	Centre	Ireland
Lifeimi Mafi	Centre	New Zealand
Barry Murphy	Centre	Ireland
Ian Dowling	Wing	Ireland
Keith Earls	Wing	Ireland
Doug Howlett	Wing	New Zealand
Ciarán O'Boyle	Wing	Ireland
Denis Hurley	Fullback	Ireland
Felix Jones	Fullback	Ireland
Danny Riordan	Fullback	Ireland

== Pre-season ==
14 August 2009

Munster (Ireland)	19–17	(England) Sale Sharks
	Report

Musgrave Park
Attendance: 6,100

21 August 2009

Munster (Ireland)	31–23	(England) London Irish
	Report

Musgrave Park
Attendance: 8,000

28 August 2009

Leicester Tigers (England)	34–28	(Ireland) Munster
	Report

Welford Road

== 2009–10 Celtic League ==
	Team	Pld	W	D	L	PF	PA	PD	TF	TA	Try bonus	Losing bonus	Pts
1	(Ireland) Leinster	18	13	0	5	359	295	+64	27	29	1	2	55
2	(Wales) Ospreys	18	11	1	6	384	298	+86	37	26	3	3	52
3	(Scotland) Glasgow Warriors	18	11	2	5	390	321	+69	31	24	2	1	51
4	(Ireland) Munster	18	9	0	9	319	282	+37	33	20	3	6	45
5	(Wales) Cardiff Blues	18	10	0	8	349	315	+34	33	28	2	2	44
6	(Scotland) Edinburgh	18	8	0	10	385	391	−6	40	40	4	5	41
7	(Wales) Newport Gwent Dragons	18	8	1	9	333	378	−45	32	37	3	2	39
8	(Ireland) Ulster	18	7	1	10	357	370	−13	39	35	4	2	36
9	(Wales) Scarlets	18	5	0	13	361	382	−21	35	35	1	8	29
10	(Ireland) Connacht	18	5	1	12	254	459	−205	20	53	0	4	26
Under the standard bonus point system, points are awarded as follows: 4 points for a win; 2 points for a draw; 1 bonus point for scoring 4 tries (or more) (Try bonus); 1 bonus point for losing by 7 points (or fewer) (Losing bonus)
Green background (rows 1 to 4) are play-off places. Source: RaboDirect PRO12

4 September 2009
20:00

Glasgow Warriors (Scotland)	22–9	(Ireland) Munster
	Report

Firhill Stadium
Attendance: 3,694
Referee: James Jones

11 September 2009
19:05

Munster (Ireland)	24–13	(Wales) Cardiff Blues
	Report

Thomond Park
Attendance: 19,747
Referee: Peter Allan

19 September 2009
18:30

Scarlets (Wales)	20–22	(Ireland) Munster
	Report

Parc y Scarlets
Attendance: 6,313
Referee: Alain Rolland

27 September 2009
17:05

Munsters (Ireland)	27–3	(Wales) Newport Gwent Dragons
	Report

Musgrave Park
Attendance: 8,685

3 October 2009
18:30

Leinster (Ireland)	30–0	(Ireland) Munster
	Report

RDS Arena
Attendance: 18,500
Referee: Simon McDowell

23 October 2009
20:00

Edinburgh (Scotland)	12–7	(Ireland) Munster
	Report

Murrayfield
Attendance: 5,426

31 October 2009
17:00

Munster (Ireland)	24–10	(Ireland) Ulster
	Report

Thomond Park
Attendance: 23,298
Referee: Alain Rolland

5 December 2009
18:30

Ospreys (Wales)	19–14	Munster
	Report

Thomond Park
Attendance: 8,077

26 December 2009
19:30

Munster (Ireland)	35–3	(Ireland) Connacht
	Report

Thomond Park
Attendance: 25,291
Referee: Alain Rolland

2 January 2010
18:00

Ulster (Ireland)	15–10	(Ireland) Munster
	Report

Ravenhill
Attendance: 11,800

19 February 2010
20:00

Munster (Ireland)	19–12	(Scotland) Edinburgh
	Report

Musgrave Park
Attendance: 8,685
Referee: Tim Hayes

6 March 2010
18:30

Newport Gwent Dragons (Wales)	31–22	(Ireland) Munster
	Report

Rodney Parade
Attendance: 6,137

18 March 2010
19:35

Munster (Ireland)	23–17	(Wales) Scarlets
	Report

Musgrave Park
Attendance: 8,685

26 March 2010
20:00

Munster (Ireland)	27–19	(Scotland) Glasgow Warriors
	Report

Thomond Park
Attendance: 23,814
Referee: James Jones

2 April 2010
20:05

Munster (Ireland)	15–16	(Ireland) Leinster
	Report

Thomond Park
Attendance: 26,263
Referee: Romain Poite

18 April 2010
19:05

Connacht (Ireland)	12–18	(Ireland) Munster
	Report

Galway Sportsgrounds
Attendance: 4,125
Referee: Alain Rolland

24 April 2010
18:30

Munster (Ireland)	11–15	(Wales) Ospreys
	Report

Thomond Park
Attendance: 23,754

9 May 2010
18:15

Cardiff Blues (Wales)	13–12	(Ireland) Munster
	Report

Cardiff City Stadium
Attendance: 12,602
Referee: Peter Allan

== Play-offs ==
=== Semi-final ===
15 May 2010
19:35

Leinster (Ireland)	16–6	(Ireland) Munster
	Report

RDS Arena
Attendance: 19,750
Referee: Nigel Owens

== 2009–10 Heineken Cup ==
=== Pool 1 ===
Team	P	W	D	L	Tries for	Tries against	Try diff	Points for	Points against	Points diff	TB	LB	Pts
(Ireland) Munster (1)	6	5	0	1	19	10	9	185	94	91	3	1	24
(England) Northampton Saints (8)	6	4	0	2	16	8	8	138	104	34	2	1	19
(France) Perpignan	6	2	0	4	12	10	2	108	123	−15	1	2	11
(Italy) Benetton Treviso	6	1	0	5	7	26	−19	68	178	−110	0	1	5

10 October 2009
18:00

Northampton Saints (England)	31–27	(Ireland) Munster
	Report

Franklin's Gardens
Attendance: 13,550
Referee: Christophe Berdos

17 October 2009
13:35

Munster (Ireland)	41–10	(Italy) Benetton Treviso
	Report

Thomond Park
Attendance: 26,043

11 December 2009
20:00

Munster (Ireland)	24–23	(France) Perpignan
	Report

Thomond Park
Attendance: 26,043
Referee: Wayne Barnes

20 December 2009
16:00

(France) Perpignan	14–37	(Ireland) Munster
	Report

Stade Aimé Giral
Attendance: 14,282
Referee: Dave Pearson

16 January 2010
14:35

Benetton Treviso (Italy)	7–44	(Ireland) Munster
	Report

Stadio Comunale di Monigo
Attendance: 6,000
Referee: Chris White

22 January 2010
20:00

Munster (Ireland)	12–9	(England) Northampton Saints
	Report

Thomond Park
Attendance: 26,043
Referee: Romain Poite

=== Quarter-final ===
10 April 2010
17:30

Munster (Ireland)	33–19	(England) Northampton Saints
	Report

Thomond Park
Attendance: 26,043
Referee: Nigel Owens

=== Semi-final ===
2 May 2010
16:15

Biarritz (France)	18–7	(Ireland) Munster
	Report

Anoeta Stadium
Attendance: 30,900
Referee: Dave Pearson
