= 2008 Heineken Cup final =

2008 Heineken Cup Final
- Event: 2007–08 Heineken Cup
Munster	Toulouse
(Ireland)	(France)
16	13
- Date: 24 May 2008
- Venue: Millennium Stadium, Cardiff
- Man of the Match: Alan Quinlan (Munster)
- Referee: Nigel Owens (Wales)
- Attendance: 74,417

The 2008 Heineken Cup Final was the final match of the 2007–08 Heineken Cup, the 13th season of Europe's top club rugby union competition. The match was played on 24 May 2008 at the Millennium Stadium in Cardiff. The match was contested by Munster of Ireland and Toulouse of France. Munster won their second Heineken Cup title with a 16–13 win.

Munster did not play in their traditional red strip as they lost the toss - they wore blue - although they were in the same away dressing room as they were in 2006.

Fans gathered in Place du Capitole in Toulouse, and on O'Connell Street in Limerick, where they watched the match on a large screen.

Munster coach Declan Kidney, who guided the province to all their previous Heineken Cup final named an unchanged team for his final game in charge before he took over the Ireland national team. Toulouse the Heineken Cup winners in 1996, 2003 and 2005 had two changes from their semi-final victory over London Irish at Twickenham, with Maleli Kunavore partnering Yannick Jauzion in the centre and the French international flanker Thierry Dusautoir replaced Yannick Nyanga. Byron Kelleher was declared match fit just in time for the kickoff.

== Match ==
=== Summary ===
The final was hosted at the neutral Millennium Stadium, Cardiff, and refereed by Welsh referee Nigel Owens. Toulouse kicked off and managed to regain possession. Toulouse dominated the early parts of the game, and although they missed a penalty goal five minutes into the game, scrum-half Jean-Baptiste Élissalde successfully kicked a drop goal after eight minutes to give them a 3–0 lead. Toulouse continued to dominate territory but Munster winger Doug Howlett made a break in the 29th minute setting up a ruck close to the Toulouse try-line. Munster number eight Denis Leamy then broke from a ruck and attempted to place the ball over the try-line, but lost it forward in the process. From the resulting scrum, Toulouse were pushed off their own ball and Munster gained possession from which Leamy scored. The try was converted by Ronan O'Gara to give Munster a 7–3 lead after 33 minutes. Three minutes later, Munster were awarded a penalty after Toulouse captain Fabien Pelous was caught not rolling away in the ruck. O'Gara kicked the penalty to extend Munster's lead to 10–3. On the 40-minute mark, Leamy was penalised for going into a ruck off his feet and Élissalde kicked the penalty to reduce Munster's lead to four points at half-time.

Ten minutes into the second half, Munster centre Rua Tipoki threw a pass that would have given a try to Howlett, but the pass was deemed forward. One minute later Toulouse's Pelous kicked Munster flanker Alan Quinlan after Quinlan had stood on Pelous' hand. After the intervention of touch judge Nigel Whitehouse, Pelous was shown a yellow card for his part in the incident and sent to the sin bin for 10 minutes. O'Gara kicked Munster's resulting penalty to give his team a 13–6 lead after 51 minutes. Three minutes later, Toulouse fullback Cédric Heymans threw the ball into himself, then kicked ahead before collecting his own kick. He then chipped ahead which Toulouse's Yannick Jauzion kicked once more before wing Yves Donguy grounded the ball to give Toulouse a try. Elissalde converted the try to tie the scores at 13–13 after 54 minutes. Pelous returned from the sin-bin in the 61st minute, and four minutes later was penalised yet again for not rolling away in the ruck. O'Gara kicked the penalty which gave Munster a 16–13 lead. For most of the remaining time, Munster employed the pick-and-go technique, where the forwards would drive the ball from ruck to ruck in an effort to retain possession and use up time. Munster were penalised in the 78th minute after 17 phases of play; the ball was kicked downfield by Toulouse who counter-attacked. Munster turned the ball over, however, and won a kickable penalty with ten seconds left on the clock. Referee Nigel Owens stopped the clock until the penalty was taken; because of the risk of Toulouse recovering possession, the options of kicking for goal and kicking for touch were ruled out. Instead, Ronan O'Gara tapped the penalty and went into contact. With the ten seconds used up, the ball became unplayable in the collapsed maul, Owens blew the final whistle, and Munster had won 16–13.

=== Details ===
24 May 2008
17:00 BST

Munster (Ireland)	16 – 13	(France) Toulouse
Try: Leamy 33' c Con: O'Gara; Pen: O'Gara (3/3) 36', 51', 65'	Report	Try: Donguy 54' c Con: Élissalde; Pen: Élissalde (1/2) 40+1'; Drop: Élissalde 9'

Millennium Stadium, Cardiff
Attendance: 74,417
Referee: Nigel Owens (Wales)

FB	15	(Ireland) Denis Hurley
RW	14	(New Zealand) Doug Howlett
OC	13	(New Zealand) Rua Tipoki
IC	12	(Tonga) Lifeimi Mafi
LW	11	(Ireland) Ian Dowling
FH	10	(Ireland) Ronan O'Gara
SH	9	(Ireland) Tomás O'Leary
N8	8	(Ireland) Denis Leamy
OF	7	(Ireland) David Wallace
BF	6	(Ireland) Alan Quinlan
RL	5	(Ireland) Paul O'Connell (c)	Substituted off Substituted on
LL	4	(Ireland) Donncha O'Callaghan
TP	3	(Ireland) John Hayes
HK	2	(Ireland) Jerry Flannery
LP	1	(Ireland) Marcus Horan	Substituted off Substituted on
Replacements:
HK	16	(Ireland) Frankie Sheahan
PR	17	(Ireland) Tony Buckley	Substituted on Substituted off
LK	18	(Ireland) Mick O'Driscoll	Substituted on Substituted off
FL	19	(Ireland) Donnacha Ryan
SH	20	(Ireland) Peter Stringer
FH	21	(Australia) Paul Warwick
CE	22	(Ireland) Keith Earls
Coach:
(Ireland) Declan Kidney

FB	15	(France) Cédric Heymans
RW	14	(France) Maxime Médard
OC	13	(Fiji) Maleli Kunavore
IC	12	(France) Yannick Jauzion
LW	11	(France) Yves Donguy		Substituted off
FH	10	(France) Jean-Baptiste Élissalde
SH	9	(New Zealand) Byron Kelleher
N8	8	(South Africa) Shaun Sowerby
OF	7	(France) Thierry Dusautoir		Substituted off
BF	6	(France) Jean Bouilhou		Substituted off
RL	5	(Argentina) Patricio Albacete		Substituted off
LL	4	(France) Fabien Pelous (c)	Temporarily suspended
TP	3	(Italy) Salvatore Perugini		Substituted off
HK	2	(France) William Servat
LP	1	(South Africa) Daan Human
Replacements:
HK	16	(Argentina) Alberto Vernet Basualdo
PR	17	(France) Jean-Baptiste Poux		Substituted on
LK	18	(France) Romain Millo-Chluski		Substituted on
FL	19	(France) Yannick Nyanga		Substituted on
CE	20	(France) Florian Fritz
CE	21	(Tonga) Manu Ahotaeiloa		Substituted on
FL	22	(France) Grégory Lamboley		Substituted on
Coach:
(France) Guy Novès

Man of the Match:
(Ireland) Alan Quinlan (Munster)

Touch judges:
Nigel Whitehouse (Wales)
Hugh Watkins (Wales)
Television match official:
Derek Bevan (Wales)
Fourth official:
Wayne Barnes (England)

== Post-match ==
Munster received their medals, and performed a lap of honour to the song "Stand' Up and Fight".

== See also ==
- 2007–08 Heineken Cup
