= Munster in European rugby =

Munster Rugby is one of the four professional provincial rugby teams from the island of Ireland. They compete in the United Rugby Championship and the European Rugby Champions Cup. Munster competed in its first European rugby competition in the first ever Heineken Cup in 1995-96. They have won the competition on two occasions in 2006 and 2008.

== Heineken Cup / European Rugby Champions Cup ==
Season	Pool/Round	Pos	Played	Won	Drawn	Lost	Bonus	Points
1995–96	Pool 4	2	2	1	0	1	–	2
1996–97	Pool 4	4	4	2	0	2	–	4
1997–98	Pool 4	4	6	2	0	4	–	4
1998–99	Pool 2	2	6	4	1	1	–	9
1998–99	Quarter-final	Colomiers 23 – 9 Munster						
1999–00	Pool 4	1	6	5	0	1	–	10
1999–00	Quarter-final	Munster 27 – 10 Stade Français						
1999–00	Semi-final	Toulouse 25 – 31 Munster						
1999–00	Final	Northampton 9 – 8 Munster						
2000–01	Pool 4	1	6	5	0	1	–	10
2000–01	Quarter-final	Munster 38 – 29 Biarritz						
2000–01	Semi-final	Stade Français 16 – 15 Munster						
2001–02	Pool 4	2	6	5	0	1	–	10
2001–02	Quarter-final	Stade Français 14 – 16 Munster						
2001–02	Semi-final	Castres 17 – 25 Munster						
2001–02	Final	Leicester 15 – 9 Munster						
2002–03	Pool 2	2	6	4	0	2	–	8
2002–03	Quarter-final	Leicester 7 – 20 Munster						
2002–03	Semi-final	Toulouse 13 – 12 Munster						
2003–04	Pool 5	1	6	5	0	1	4	24
2003–04	Quarter-final	Munster 37 – 32 Stade Français						
2003–04	Semi-final	Munster 32 – 37 Wasps						
2004–05	Pool 4	1	6	5	0	1	2	22
2004–05	Quarter-final	Biarritz 19 – 10 Munster						
2005–06	Pool 1	1	6	5	0	1	3	23
2005–06	Quarter-final	Munster 19 – 10 Perpignan						
2005–06	Semi-final	Leinster 6 – 30 Munster						
2005–06	Final	Biarritz 19 – 23 Munster						
2006–07	Pool 4	2	6	5	0	1	3	23
2006–07	Quarter-final	Scarlets 24 – 15 Munster						
2007–08	Pool 5	1	6	4	0	2	3	19
2007–08	Quarter-final	Gloucester 3 – 16 Munster						
2007–08	Semi-final	Saracens 16 – 18 Munster						
2007–08	Final	Toulouse 13 – 16 Munster						
2008–09	Pool 1	1	6	5	0	1	3	23
2008–09	Quarter-final	Munster 43 – 9 Ospreys						
2008–09	Semi-final	Munster 6 – 25 Leinster						
2009–10	Pool 1	1	6	5	0	1	4	24
2009–10	Quarter-final	Munster 33 – 19 Northampton						
2009–10	Semi-final	Biarritz 18 – 7 Munster						
2010–11	Pool 3	2	6	3	0	3	4	16
2011–12	Pool 1	1	6	6	0	0	1	25
2011–12	Quarter-final	Munster 16 – 22 Ulster						
2012–13	Pool 1	2	6	4	0	2	4	20
2012–13	Quarter-final	Harlequins 12 – 18 Munster						
2012–13	Semi-final	Clermont 16 – 10 Munster						
2013–14	Pool 6	1	6	5	0	1	3	23
2013–14	Quarter-final	Munster 47 – 23 Toulouse						
2013–14	Semi-final	Toulon 24 – 16 Munster						
2014–15	Pool 1	3	6	3	0	3	3	15
2015–16	Pool 4	3	6	3	0	3	3	15
2016–17	Pool 1	1	6	5	0	1	4	24
2016–17	Quarter-final	Munster 41 – 16 Toulouse						
2016–17	Semi-final	Munster 10 – 26 Saracens						
2017–18	Pool 4	1	6	4	1	1	3	21
2017–18	Quarter-final	Munster 20 – 19 Toulon						
2017–18	Semi-final	Racing 92 27 – 22 Munster						
2018–19	Pool 2	1	6	4	1	1	3	21
2018–19	Quarter-final	Edinburgh 13 – 17 Munster						
2018–19	Semi-final	Saracens 32 – 16 Munster						
2019–20	Pool 4	3	6	3	1	2	2	16
2020–21	Pool B	4	2	2	0	0	0	8 (Note: Final two pools games of revised 2020–21 tournament cancelled due to French government decision to prevent their teams from travelling abroad for fixtures due to COVID-19.)
2020–21	Last 16	Munster 33 – 40 Toulouse						
2021–22	Pool B	3	4	4	0	0	2	18
2021–22	Last 16 (1st leg)	Exeter Chiefs 13 – 8 Munster						
2021–22	Last 16 (2nd leg)	Munster 26 – 10 Exeter Chiefs (Note: Munster won 34–23 on aggregate.)						
2021–22	Quarter-final	Munster 24 – 24 Toulouse (A.E.T.) (Note: Toulouse won 4–2 on penalties.)						
2022–23	Pool B	6	4	2	0	2	2	10
2022–23	Last 16	Sharks 50 – 35 Munster						
2023–24	Pool C	4	6	1	1	2	3	9
2023–24	Last 16	Northampton Saints 24 – 14 Munster						

== European Rugby Challenge Cup ==
Season	Round	Result
2010–11	Quarter-final	Brive 37 – 42 Munster
2010–11	Semi-final	Munster 12 – 20 Harlequins

== Heineken Cup Record ==
Team	P	W	D	L	Tries for	Tries against	Try diff	Points for	Points against	Points diff	Pts	Status
(Wales) Swansea	2	1	0	1	3	3	0	35	27	8	2	Advanced to the semi-finals
(Ireland) Munster	2	1	0	1	2	2	0	29	32	−3	2	Eliminates
(France) Castres	2	1	0	1	2	2	0	29	34	−5	2	Eliminates

1 November 1995
14:30

Munster (Ireland)	17–13	(Wales) Swansea
Try: Pat Murray; Richard Wallace; Con: Ken Smith; Pen: Ken Smith	Report	Try: Alan Harris; Con: Aled Williams; Pen: Aled Williams

Thomond Park
Attendance: 6,000
Referee: Ed Morrison

8 November 1995
20:00

Castres (France)	19–12	(Ireland) Munster
Try: Nicolas Combes; Con: Laurent Labit; Pen: Laurent Labit (4)	Report	Pen: Ken Smith (4)

Stade Antoine Beguere
Attendance: 6,500
Referee: David Davies

Team	P	W	D	L	Tries for	Tries against	Try diff	Points for	Points against	Points diff	Pts
(France) Toulouse	4	3	0	1	21	13	8	157	142	15	6
(Wales) Cardiff	4	3	0	1	16	7	9	135	97	38	6
(England) London Wasps	4	2	0	2	17	14	3	156	115	41	4
(Ireland) Munster	4	2	0	2	11	22	–11	109	135	–26	4
(Italy) Milan	4	0	0	4	6	15	–9	73	141	–68	0

12 October 1996
15:00

Munster (Ireland)	23–5	(Italy) Milan
	Report

Musgrave Park
Attendance: 1,500

16 October 1996
19:15

Cardiff (Wales)	48–18	(Ireland) Munster
	Report

Cardiff Arms Park
Attendance: 4,000

19 October 1996
15:30

Munster (Ireland)	49–22	(England) London Wasps
	Report

Thomond Park
Attendance: 6,000

2 November 1996
16:00

Toulouse (France)	60–19	(Ireland) Munster
	Report

Les Sept Deniers
Attendance: 14,000

Team	P	W	D	L	Tries for	Tries against	Try diff	Points for	Points against	Points diff	Pts
(England) Harlequins	6	4	0	2	21	12	9	198	141	57	8
(Wales) Cardiff	6	4	0	2	17	15	2	184	146	38	8
(Ireland) Munster	6	2	0	4	14	21	−7	141	180	−39	4
(France) Bourgoin	6	2	0	4	7	11	−4	93	149	−56	4

7 September 1997
14:00

Harlequins (England)	48 – 40	(Ireland) Munster

Twickenham Stoop
Attendance: 3,682

13 September 1997
14:30

Cardiff (Wales)	43 – 23	(Ireland) Munster

Cardiff Arms Park
Attendance: 4,500

20 September 1997
15:00

Munster (Ireland)	17 – 15	(France) Bourgoin

Thomond Park
Attendance: 6,000

27 September 1997
15:00

Munster (Ireland)	32 – 37	(Wales) Cardiff

Musgrave Park
Attendance: 5,000

4 October 1997
15:00

Bourgoin (France)	21 – 6	(Ireland) Munster

Stade Pierre Rajon
Attendance: 6,000

12 October 1997
14:30

Munster (Ireland)	23 – 16	(England) Harlequins

Thomond Park
Attendance: 10,000

Team	P	W	D	L	Tries for	Tries against	Try diff	Points for	Points against	Points diff	Pts
(France) Perpignan	6	5	0	1	35	13	22	238	108	130	10
(Ireland) Munster	6	4	1	1	17	13	4	144	108	36	9
(Wales) Neath	6	1	1	4	14	27	−13	118	194	−76	3
(Italy) Safilo Petraca Rugby Padova	6	1	0	5	8	21	−13	79	169	−90	2

19 September 1998
14:30

Munster (Ireland)	20 – 13	(Italy) Petrarca

Musgrave Park
Attendance: 2,000

26 September 1998
14:30

Munster (Ireland)	34 – 10	(Wales) Neath

Musgrave Park
Attendance: 1,500

10 October 1998
15:15

Perpignan (France)	41 – 24	(Ireland) Munster

Stade Gilbert Brutus
Attendance: 5,000

17 October 1998
14:30

Neath (Wales)	18 – 18	(Ireland) Munster

The Gnoll
Attendance: 1,200

31 October 1998
14:30

Munster (Ireland)	13 – 5	(France) Perpignan

Musgrave Park
Attendance: 4,000

8 November 1998
16:00

Petrarca (Italy)	21 – 35	(Ireland) Munster

Stadio Plebiscito
Attendance: 500

=== Quarter-final ===
13 December 1998
15:00

Colomiers (France)	23 – 9	(Ireland) Munster

Stade Selery
Attendance: 8,000

== European Challenge Cup Record ==
Munster entered the competition as one of the top 3 2010-11 Heineken Cup pool runners-up who failed to qualify for the Heineken Cup quarter-finals.

9 April 2011, Quarter-final
14.00

Brive (France)	37 - 42	(Ireland) Munster
Try: Uys 17' c Estebanez 20' c Palisson 70' c Perry 80' c Con: Belie (4/4) 17',20',80',70'; Pen: Belie 10',36',45'	Report	Try: Howlett (2) 1' c, 22' c Earls (2) 4' c, 46' c Stringer 50' c Con: O'Gara (4/5); Pen: O'Gara (3/3) 53', 66', 68'

Stade Amédée-Domenech, Brive-la-Gaillarde
Attendance: 8,500
Referee: Dave Pearson (England)

30 April 2011, Semi-final
13:00

Munster (Ireland)	12 – 20	(England) Harlequins
Try: Jones 40' c Howlett 78' m Con: O'Gara (1/2)	Report	Try: Robson 9' c Care 34' c Con: Evans (1/1); Care (1/1); Pen: Clegg (2/2) 49', 59'

Thomond Park, Limerick
Attendance: 24,907
Referee: Romain Poite (France)
