= Donnacha Ryan =

Irish rugby union player (born 1983)

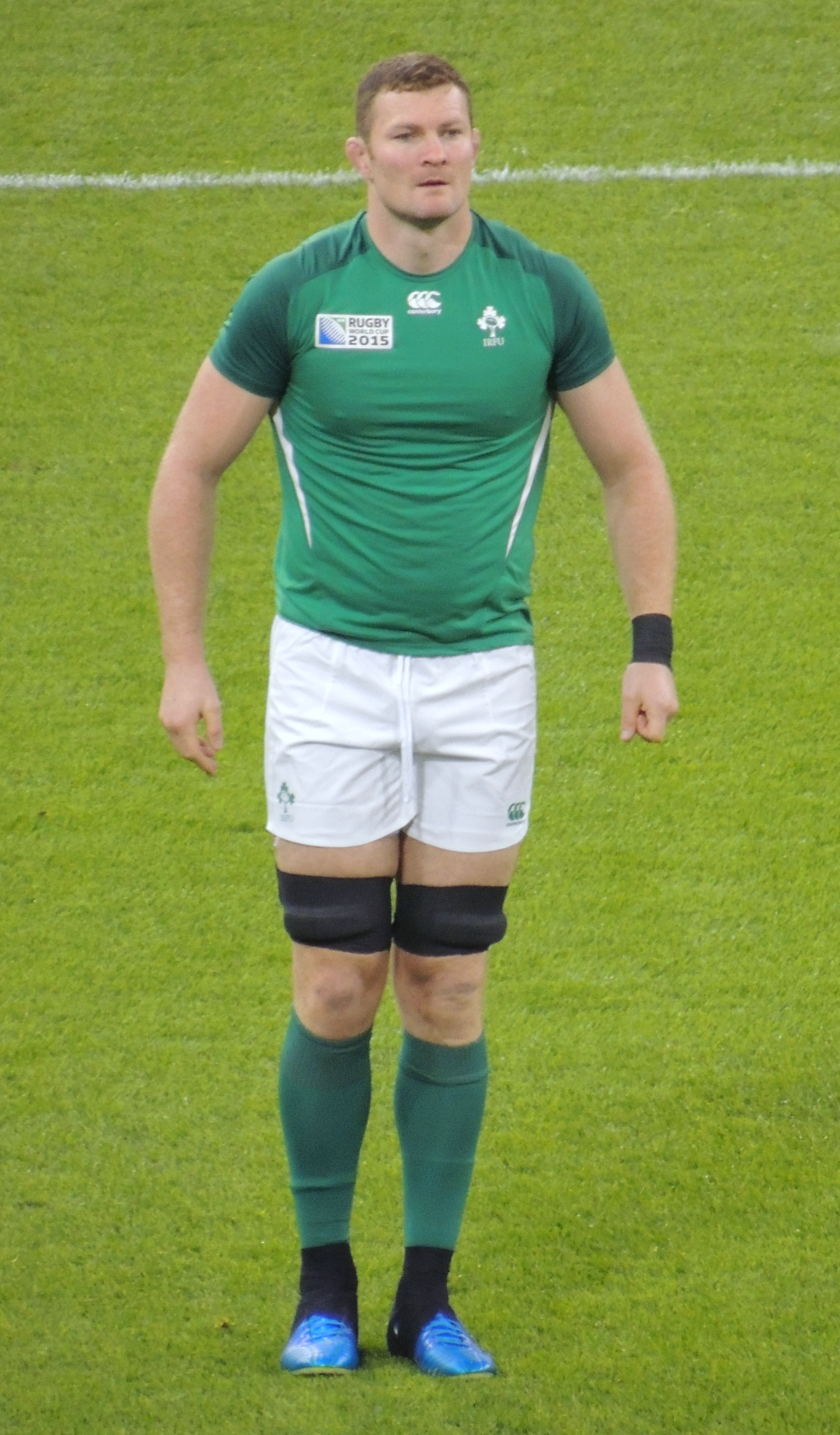
- Ryan warming up for Ireland during the 2015 Rugby World Cup
- Born: 11 December 1983 (age 42) Nenagh, County Tipperary, Ireland
- Height: 2.01 m (6 ft 7 in)
- Weight: 115 kg (18.1 st; 254 lb)
- School: St Joseph’s CBS Nenagh
- University: University College Cork

Rugby union career
- Position(s): Lock, Flanker
Amateur team(s)
Years	Team	Apps	(Points)
- Nenagh Ormond
20??–2017	Shannon		
Senior career
Years	Team	Apps	(Points)
2004–2017	Munster	167	(35)
2017–2021	Racing 92	84	(15)
- Correct as of 18 June 2021
International career
Years	Team	Apps	(Points)
2008–2011	Ireland Wolfhounds	12	(0)
2008–2017	Ireland	47	(0)
- Correct as of 18 March 2017
Coaching career
- Years: Team
- 2021–: La Rochelle (Assistant coach)

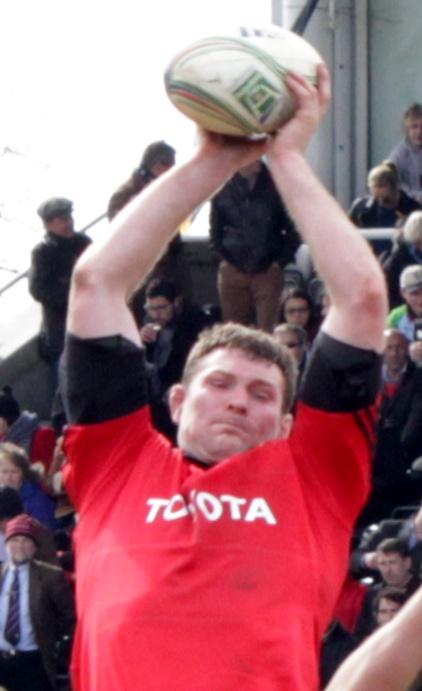
Ryan contesting a line-out in the Heineken Cup

Donnacha Ryan (born 11 December 1983) is an Irish former rugby union player and current coach. Ryan spent most of his career representing his native province Munster, spending 13 seasons at the club, before moving to French club Racing 92 in 2017, where he spent the final four seasons of his playing career before retiring and joining the coaching team at La Rochelle ahead of the 2021–22 season. He played primarily as a lock, but could also play as a flanker.

== Early career ==
Ryan went to school at CBS Nenagh and played all his underage rugby with Nenagh Ormond, representing Munster and Irish Youths, before moving to St Munchin's College in Limerick, where he was a key member of the side that won the Munster Schools Rugby Senior Cup in 2002. Ryan originally began playing rugby at the age of 17 in order to bulk up and earn selection for the Tipperary Minor Hurling team, but instead ended up pursuing rugby. He joined Limerick amateur club Shannon, who play in the All-Ireland League, and won an AIL League medal with the club in the 2005–06 season.

== Professional career ==
=== Munster ===
At the age of 20, Ryan made his debut for Munster against Ospreys on 3 September 2004 during a Celtic League fixture. He made his Heineken Cup debut against Scarlets on 16 December 2007. He played for Munster in their 2007–08 Heineken Cup semi-final against Saracens, and was on the bench for the 2008 Heineken Cup Final against Toulouse, which Munster won 16–13.

Ryan was part of the Munster squad that won the 2008–09 Celtic League, and he added a second Celtic League winners medal to his collection when Munster beat arch-rivals, and newly crowned Heineken Cup champions, Leinster 19–9 in the 2011 Celtic League Grand Final. After the 2011 Rugby World Cup, he began to regularly partner Paul O'Connell in the Munster pack, particularly during the 2011–12 Heineken Cup, keeping Donncha O'Callaghan on the bench. It was announced on 13 March 2012 that Ryan had signed a contract extension with the IRFU. On 8 April 2012, Ryan won his 100th cap for Munster in the 2011–12 Heineken Cup quarter-final against Ulster. He also won the Munster Player of the Year award for the 2011–12 season.

Ryan started all of Munster's 2012–13 Heineken Cup pool games and was a crucial player in getting them through to the semi-finals. In December 2013, Ryan signed a new three-year contract with Munster. On 1 October 2016, Ryan earned his 150th cap for Munster during the 2016–17 Pro12 fixture against Zebre. On 27 May, Ryan made his final appearance for Munster when he started against Scarlets in the 2017 Pro12 Grand Final in the Aviva Stadium, Dublin.

=== Racing 92 ===
On 19 May 2017, it was announced that Ryan would be leaving Munster upon the conclusion on the 2016–17 season to join French Top 14 side Racing 92. A neck hernia ruled Ryan out until the end of November 2017, though he made his Racing debut on 3 December 2017 and started against his former club Munster on 14 January 2018. Ryan featured as a replacement for Racing 92 in the 2020 European Rugby Champions Cup Final against English club Exeter Chiefs on 17 October, which the Parisian side narrowly lost 31–27. Ryan's final game for Racing 92 was their 19–6 defeat against Ronan O'Gara's La Rochelle in the semi-finals of the 2020–21 Top 14 season on 18 June 2021.

== Ireland ==
Ryan represented Ireland at Youth U18 level and at U21. He made his debut for the Irish national team on 22 November 2008 in a test against Argentina in Croke Park, Dublin. Ryan missed out on selection for the Ireland senior squad for the 2009 Six Nations Championship, and had to wait until the 2009 Summer Tests to play for Ireland again, earning caps against Canada and the USA. He was named in the squad for the 2009 November Tests, but did not earn any caps during the series.

Named in Ireland's squad for the 2010 Six Nations Championship, Ryan made his Six Nations debut against Italy on 6 February 2010 as a replacement. He made another replacement appearance against France on 13 February, but did not feature in the rest of the tournament. He missed out on selection for Ireland's 2010 Summer Tour, but was back for Ireland during the 2010 November Tests and made appearances off the bench against South Africa and Samoa.

Ryan missed out on selection for Ireland's squad for the 2011 Six Nations Championship, but was named in the training squad for the 2011 Rugby World Cup. He made his first start for Ireland in the World Cup warm-up against Scotland on 6 August 2011, as well as playing against France and England. He won selection in the final 30-man squad for the tournament in New Zealand, and made three appearances at the tournament, including a start against Russia and bench appearances against Italy and Wales. He was selected in Ireland's 24-man squad for the 2012 Six Nations Championship. He came off the bench against Wales, Italy and France, and made his first Six Nations start in the Round 4 game against Scotland, in which he was named man of the match. Ryan started in all of Ireland's tests against New Zealand in June 2012, as part the 2012 Tour of New Zealand, and the tests against South Africa and Argentina in November 2012.

Ryan continued to hold down the Ireland number 5 jersey going into the 2013 Six Nations Championship, starting against Wales, England Scotland, France, and Italy. Ryan was added to Ireland's squad for the 2014 Six Nations Championship on 17 February 2014. Ryan was named in the 45-man training squad for the 2015 Rugby World Cup on 24 June 2015. He started in the first World Cup warm-up against Wales on 8 August 2015. Ryan came off the bench in the third warm-up game against Wales on 29 August 2015. He was selected in the final 31-man squad for the World Cup when it was announced on 1 September 2015. Ryan came off the bench in the final warm-up game against England on 5 September 2015. He came off the bench in the pool opener against Canada on 19 September 2015. Ryan started the second pool game against Romania on 27 September 2015. He came off the bench for Ireland in the 43-20 quarter-final defeat against Argentina on 18 October 2015.

On 20 January 2016, Ryan was named in Ireland's 35-man squad for the 2016 Six Nations. On 7 February 2016, he came off the bench against Wales in Ireland's opening match of the Six Nations. On 13 February 2016, he came off the bench against France in Ireland's second game of the Six Nations. On 12 March 2016, Ryan won the Man-of-the-Match award in Ireland's 58-15 win against Italy.

On 25 May 2016, Ryan was named in the 32-man Ireland squad to tour South Africa in a 3-test series. On 18 June 2016, Ryan came on as a replacement in the second test against South Africa. On 26 October 2016, Ryan was named in Ireland's squad for the 2016 end-of-year rugby union internationals. On 5 November 2016, Ryan started in Ireland's test against New Zealand at Soldier Field, Chicago. Ireland's 40-29 win was their first ever against New Zealand. On 23 January 2017, Ryan was named in the Ireland squad for the opening two rounds of the 2017 Six Nations Championship. Having been dropped for the opening fixture against Scotland, Ryan was restored to Ireland's starting XV for the four remaining fixtures against Italy, France, Wales and England.

== Coaching career ==
Upon the conclusion of the 2020–21 season, Ryan, who hadn't been offered a contract extension by Racing 92, rejected offers from Pro D2 clubs to continue his playing career and retired, joining the coaching team at La Rochelle, where Ryan's former Munster teammate and Racing 92 coach Ronan O'Gara was director of rugby.

Ryan was part of the coaching setup at La Rochelle that won the 2021–22 European Rugby Champions Cup beating Leinster in the final 24-21.

The following year, La Rochelle repeated the achievement by winning 2022–23 European Rugby Champions Cup, this time beating Leinster 27-26 at the Aviva Stadium. In a post-match interview, La Rochelle's Director of Rugby, Ronan O'Gara, commented on Ryan's involvement, saying, 'he's coaching for two years, he has two European Cup medals so he's probably the most performing coach in the world'. Despite only coaching for two years, winning back to back European Champions Cup medals makes Ryan one of the most successful coaches in World Rugby.

== Statistics ==
=== International analysis by opposition ===
Against	Played	Won	Lost	Drawn	Tries	Points	% Won
Argentina	3	2	1	0	0	0	66.67
Canada	3	3	0	0	0	0	100
England	6	1	5	0	0	0	20
France	6	1	3	2	0	0	16.67
Italy	6	5	1	0	0	0	83.33
New Zealand	5	1	4	0	0	0	20
Romania	1	1	0	0	0	0	100
Russia	1	1	0	0	0	0	100
Samoa	1	1	0	0	0	0	100
Scotland	4	2	2	0	0	0	50
South Africa	3	0	3	0	0	0	0
United States	1	1	0	0	0	0	100
Wales	7	2	4	1	0	0	28.57
Total	47	21	23	3	0	0	44.68

Correct as of 5 July 2017

== Honours ==
=== Munster ===
- United Rugby Championship
  - Winner (2): 2008–09, 2010–11
  - Runner Up (2): 2014–15, 2016–17
- European Rugby Champions Cup
  - Winner (1): 2007–08

=== Racing 92 ===
- European Rugby Champions Cup
  - Runner Up (1): 2017–18

=== Ireland A ===
- Churchill Cup:
  - Winner (1): 2009
