= 2007–08 Heineken Cup =

International rugby union competition

- Official logo

Tournament details
- Countries: England; France; Ireland; Italy; Scotland; Wales
- Tournament format(s): Round-robin and Knockout
- Date: 9 November 2007 to 24 May 2008

Tournament statistics
- Teams: 24
- Matches played: 79
- Attendance: 942,373 (11,929 per match)
- Top point scorer(s): Ronan O Gara Munster 113 points
- Top try scorer(s): Vincent Clerc (Toulouse); Richard Haughton (Saracens); Kameli Ratuvou (Saracens); Aurélien Rougerie (Clermont) (5 tries)

Final
- Venue: Millennium Stadium, Cardiff
- Attendance: 74,417
- Champions: (Ireland) Munster (2nd title)
- Runners-up: (France) Toulouse

The 2007–08 Heineken Cup was the 13th edition of the Heineken Cup, the annual rugby union European club competition for clubs from the top six nations in European rugby.

The start of the tournament was delayed because of the 2007 Rugby World Cup. After much doubt over the competition's future, caused by the threat of English and French clubs not participating, showdown talks ensured that teams from both countries would be competing in the 2007–08 tournament. The cup was won by Munster, who succeeded London Wasps as European champions after a 16–13 win over Toulouse in the final at Cardiff's Millennium Stadium.

== Italo-Celtic Playoff ==
The Italo-Celtic Playoff was a match played between the highest-placed Celtic League team not automatically qualified for the Heineken Cup and the third-placed Italian team to decide the 24th qualifying team. This year, the match was between Newport Gwent Dragons of Wales and Calvisano.

18 May 2007

Newport Gwent Dragons (Wales)	22–15	(Italy) Ghial Rugby Calvisano
Try: A. Thomas 56' c Charteris 71' m Emerick 79' c Con: Sweeney (2/3); Pen: Sweeney 30'		Try: Spragg 36' m Bernabò 46' c Con: De Marigny (1/2); Pen: De Marigny 3'

Rodney Parade, Newport
Attendance: 5,326
Referee: Paul Debney (England)

== Teams ==
Seven English teams participated, as an English team, London Wasps, progressed further in the previous year's tournament than any French or Italian team.

Four Welsh teams competed, as a Welsh team won the Italo-Celtic playoff.

Other nations had their usual number of participants: France six, Ireland three, Italy two and Scotland two.

England	France	Wales	Ireland	Scotland	Italy
(England) London Irish; (England) Gloucester; (England) Bristol; (England) Harlequins; (England) Saracens; (England) London Wasps; (England) Leicester Tigers	(France) Perpignan; (France) Bourgoin; (France) Stade Français; (France) Biarritz; (France) Clermont; (France) Toulouse	(Wales) Newport Gwent Dragons; (Wales) Ospreys; (Wales) Cardiff Blues; (Wales) Llanelli Scarlets	(Ireland) Ulster; (Ireland) Munster; (Ireland) Leinster	(Scotland) Glasgow Warriors; (Scotland) Edinburgh	(Italy) Benetton Treviso; (Italy) Viadana

== Seeding and pool draw ==
Each of the six participating nations nominated a top seed:

- (England) London Wasps
- (France) Stade Français
- (Ireland) Leinster
- (Italy) Benetton Treviso
- (Scotland) Glasgow Warriors
- (Wales) Ospreys

The draw then progressed as follows, with at no stage except the last a team being drawn into a pool containing a team from the same nation:

- The seeded teams were drawn separately into each of the six pools.
- Five of the six remaining English teams were drawn into five separate pools.
- The five remaining French teams were drawn into five separate pools.
- The three remaining Welsh teams were drawn into three separate pools.
- The two remaining Irish teams were drawn into two separate pools.
- The remaining Italian and Scottish teams were drawn into two separate pools.
- The seventh English team was drawn into the final remaining pool spot.

The pools are shown below.

== Competition format ==
In the pool matches, teams receive:

- four points for a win
- two points for a draw
- a bonus point for scoring four or more tries, regardless of the match result
- a bonus point for losing by seven or fewer points

Ties between two teams are broken in the following order:

1. Competition points earned in head-to-head matches. For example, if tied teams are in the same pool, and split their head-to-head matches, but one team earned a bonus point and the other failed to do so, the team that earned the bonus point will win.
2. Tries scored in head-to-head matches.
3. Point difference in head-to-head matches.
4. Tries scored in all pool matches. This is the first tiebreaker between teams in different pools, which can come into play for determining seeding among first-place teams (and did in 2007–08, with the top three pool winners all finishing on 24 points), or breaking ties among second-place teams.
5. Point difference in all pool matches.
6. Best disciplinary record in pool play. The team with the fewest players sent off or sin-binned during pool play wins.
7. Coin toss.

The quarter-finals are seeded from 1 to 8. The six pool winners receive the top six seeds, based on their point totals. The top two second-place finishers are seeded 7 and 8. The seeds of the qualifying teams are in parentheses next to their names in the tables.

== Pool stage ==
The draw for the pool stages took place on 20 June 2007 at Cardiff's Millennium Stadium. The winner of each pool, plus the two best runners-up, qualify for the quarter-finals.

=== Pool 1 ===
Team	P	W	D	L	Tries for	Tries against	Try diff	Points for	Points against	Points diff	TB	LB	Pts
(England) London Irish (2)	6	5	0	1	25	10	15	182	100	82	4	0	24
(France) Perpignan (7)	6	5	0	1	20	7	13	171	79	92	2	0	22
(Wales) Dragons	6	1	0	5	16	22	−6	117	191	−74	2	2	8
(Italy) Benetton Treviso	6	1	0	5	8	30	−22	107	207	−100	0	1	5

=== Pool 2 ===
Team	P	W	D	L	Tries for	Tries against	Try diff	Points for	Points against	Points diff	TB	LB	Pts
(England) Gloucester (3)	6	5	0	1	24	13	11	184	119	65	4	0	24
(Wales) Ospreys (8)	6	5	0	1	16	9	7	164	102	62	1	0	21
(France) Bourgoin	6	1	0	5	12	19	−7	118	174	−56	1	3	8
(Ireland) Ulster	6	1	0	5	13	24	−11	102	173	−71	0	1	5

=== Pool 3 ===
Team	P	W	D	L	Tries for	Tries against	Try diff	Points for	Points against	Points diff	TB	LB	Pts
(Wales) Cardiff Blues (5)	6	4	1	1	12	7	5	124	76	48	1	1	20
(France) Stade Français	6	4	0	2	12	8	4	120	92	28	2	0	18
(England) Bristol	6	3	0	3	10	9	1	83	80	3	0	0	12
(England) Harlequins	6	0	1	5	7	17	−10	62	141	−79	0	0	2

=== Pool 4 ===
Team	P	W	D	L	Tries for	Tries against	Try diff	Points for	Points against	Points diff	TB	LB	Pts
(England) Saracens (1)	6	5	0	1	27	11	16	225	119	106	3	1	24
(France) Biarritz	6	4	0	2	9	11	−2	109	116	−7	1	1	18
(Scotland) Glasgow Warriors	6	3	0	3	12	14	−2	130	127	3	1	3	16
(Italy) Viadana	6	0	0	6	13	25	−12	106	208	−102	2	1	3

=== Pool 5 ===
Team	P	W	D	L	Tries for	Tries against	Try diff	Points for	Points against	Points diff	TB	LB	Pts
(Ireland) Munster (6)	6	4	0	2	13	7	6	148	95	53	1	2	19
(France) Clermont	6	4	0	2	22	15	7	189	128	61	2	1	19
(England) London Wasps	6	4	0	2	19	12	7	152	127	25	2	0	18
(Wales) Llanelli Scarlets	6	0	0	6	8	28	−20	74	213	−139	0	0	0

=== Pool 6 ===
Team	P	W	D	L	Tries for	Tries against	Try diff	Points for	Points against	Points diff	TB	LB	Pts
(France) Toulouse (4)	6	4	0	2	13	7	6	130	76	54	2	2	20
(England) Leicester Tigers	6	3	0	3	10	5	5	110	79	31	1	1	14
(Ireland) Leinster	6	3	0	3	7	11	−4	95	123	−28	0	0	12
(Scotland) Edinburgh	6	2	0	4	8	15	−7	85	142	−57	0	1	9

== Seeding and runners-up ==
Seed	Pool winners	Pts	TF	+/−
1	(England) Saracens	24	27	+106
2	(England) London Irish	24	25	+82
3	(England) Gloucester	24	24	+65
4	(France) Toulouse	20	13	+54
5	(Wales) Cardiff Blues	20	12	+48
6	(Ireland) Munster	19	13	+53
Seed	Pool runners-up	Pts	TF	+/−
7	(France) Perpignan	22	20	+92
8	(Wales) Ospreys	21	16	+62
–	(France) Clermont	19	22	+61
–	(France) Stade Français	18	12	+28
–	(France) Biarritz	18	9	−7
–	(England) Leicester Tigers	14	10	+31

== Knockout stage ==
=== Quarter-finals ===
5 April 2008
15:00

London Irish (England)	20–9	(France) Perpignan
Try: Danaher 31' m Pen: Hewat (5) 21', 24', 53', 56', 62'	(Report)	Pen: Montgomery (3) 5', 27', 37'

Madejski Stadium, Reading
Attendance: 16,048
Referee: Alain Rolland (Ireland)

5 April 2008
17:30

Gloucester (England)	3–16	(Ireland) Munster
Pen: Lamb 67'	(Report)	Try: Dowling 37' m Howlett 61' m Pen: O'Gara (2) 15', 49'

Kingsholm Stadium, Gloucester
Attendance: 16,500
Referee: Nigel Owens (Wales)

6 April 2008
12:30

Saracens (England)	19–10	(Wales) Ospreys
Try: Leonelli 42' c Con: Jackson 43'; Pen: Jackson (3) 10', 15', 59'; Drop: Jackson 78'	(Report)	Try: James 74' c Con: Hook 75'; Pen: Hook 2'

Vicarage Road, Watford
Attendance: 18,214
Referee: Alan Lewis (Ireland)

6 April 2008
16:00

Toulouse (France)	41–17	(Wales) Cardiff Blues
Try: Medard 1' c Kunavore 61' c Clerc 71' c Bouilhou 78' m Con: Élissalde (3) 2', 62', 72'; Pen: Élissalde (3) 5', 22', 59'; Drop: Élissalde 27'; Heymans 80'	(Report)	Try: Spice 17' c Blair 67' c Con: Blair (2) 18', 68'; Pen: Blair 27'

Stadium Municipal, Toulouse
Attendance: 35,070
Referee: Wayne Barnes (England)

=== Semi-finals ===
26 April 2008
15:00

London Irish (England)	15–21	(France) Toulouse
Try: Ojo 20' c Tagicakibau 44' m Con: Hewat; Pen: Hewat 15'	(Report)	Try: Ahotaeiloa 34' m Nyanga 38' c Con: Élissalde; Pen: Élissalde (3) 11', 48', 51'

Twickenham Stadium, London
Attendance: 30,559
Referee: Alan Lewis (Ireland) (Note: Alain Rolland, also of Ireland, was originally scheduled to be referee, but was forced to withdraw due to injury.)

27 April 2008
15:00

Saracens (England)	16–18	(Ireland) Munster
Try: Ratuvou 5' c Con: Jackson; Pen: Jackson (3) 43', 57', 71'	(Report)	Try: O'Gara 25' m Quinlan 40' c Con: O'Gara; Pen: O'Gara (2) 8', 62'

Ricoh Arena, Coventry
Attendance: 30,325
Referee: Nigel Owens (Wales)

=== Final ===
24 May 2008
17:00

Toulouse (France)	13–16	(Ireland) Munster
Try: Donguy 54' c Con: Élissalde 54'; Pen: Élissalde 40+1'; Drop: Élissalde 10'	(Report)	Try: Leamy 33' c Con: O'Gara 34'; Pen: O'Gara (3) 39', 51', 64'

Millennium Stadium, Cardiff
Attendance: 74,417
Referee: Nigel Owens (Wales)

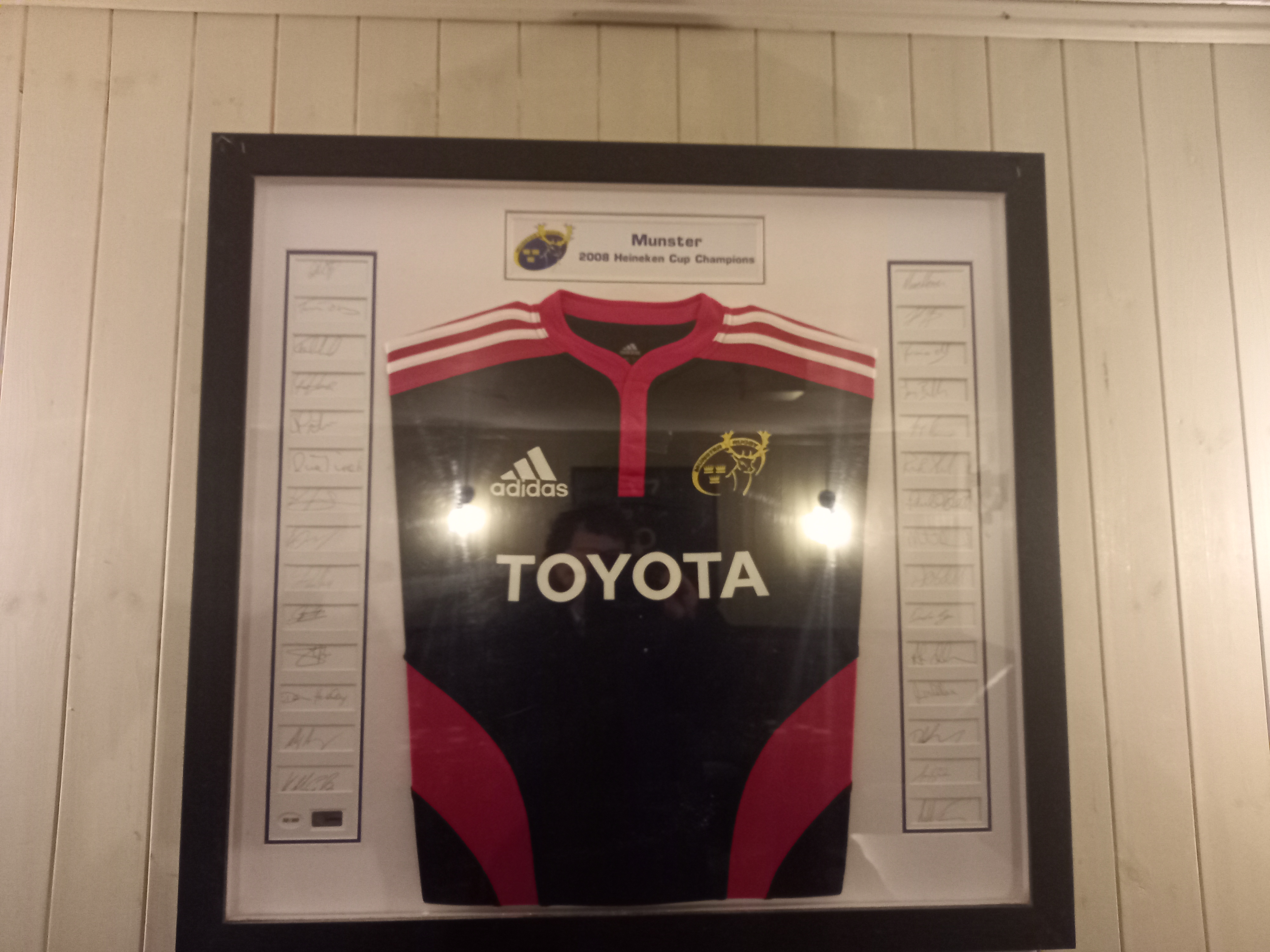
Munster shirt signed by 2008 Heineken Cup winning team

The final was hosted at the neutral Millennium Stadium, Cardiff, and refereed by Welsh referee Nigel Owens. Toulouse kicked off and managed to regain possession. Toulouse dominated the early parts of the game, and although they missed a penalty goal five minutes into the game, scrum-half Jean-Baptiste Élissalde successfully kicked a drop goal after eight minutes to give them a 3–0 lead. Toulouse continued to dominate territory but Munster winger Doug Howlett made a break in the 29th minute setting up a ruck close to the Toulouse try-line. Munster number eight Denis Leamy then broke from a ruck and attempted to place the ball over the try-line, but lost it forward in the process. From the resulting scrum, Toulouse were pushed off their own ball and Munster gained possession from which Leamy scored. The try was converted by Ronan O'Gara to give Munster a 7–3 lead after 33 minutes. Three minutes later, Munster were awarded a penalty after Toulouse captain Fabien Pelous was caught not rolling away in the ruck. O'Gara kicked the penalty to extend Munster's lead to 10–3. On the 40-minute mark, Leamy was penalised for going into a ruck off his feet and Élissalde kicked the penalty to reduce Munster's lead to four points at half-time.

Ten minutes into the second half, Munster centre Rua Tipoki threw a pass that would have given a try to Howlett, but the pass was deemed forward. One minute later Toulouse's Pelous kicked Munster flanker Alan Quinlan after Quinlan had stood on Pelous' hand. After the intervention of touch judge Nigel Whitehouse, Pelous was shown a yellow card for his part in the incident and sent to the sin bin for 10 minutes. O'Gara kicked Munster's resulting penalty to give his team a 13–6 lead after 51 minutes. Three minutes later, Toulouse fullback Cédric Heymans threw the ball into himself, then kicked ahead before collecting his own kick. He then chipped ahead which Toulouse's Yannick Jauzion kicked once more before wing Yves Donguy grounded the ball to give Toulouse a try. Élissalde converted the try to tie the scores at 13–13 after 54 minutes. Pelous returned from the sin-bin in the 61st minute, and four minutes later was penalised yet again for not rolling away in the ruck. O'Gara kicked the penalty which gave Munster a 16–13 lead. For most of the remaining time, Munster employed the pick-and-go technique, where the forwards would drive the ball from ruck to ruck in an effort to retain possession and use up time. Munster were penalised in the 78th minute after 17 phases of play; the ball was kicked downfield by Toulouse who counter-attacked. Munster turned the ball over, however, and won a kickable penalty with ten seconds left on the clock. Referee Nigel Owens stopped the clock until the penalty was taken; because of the risk of Toulouse recovering possession, the options of kicking for goal and kicking for touch were ruled out. Instead, Ronan O'Gara tapped the penalty and went into contact. With the ten seconds used up, the ball became unplayable in the collapsed maul, Owens blew the final whistle, and Munster had won 16–13.

== Statistics ==
=== Top point scorers ===
Points	Name	Club	Apps	Tries	Con	Pen	Drop
113	(Ireland) Ronan O'Gara	(Ireland) Munster	9	1	12	28	0
98	(New Zealand) Glen Jackson	(England) Saracens	6	2	20	16	0
84	(Wales) James Hook	(Wales) Ospreys	6	0	12	20	0
75	(Australia) Peter Hewat	(England) London Irish	6	4	14	9	0
75	(Scotland) Dan Parks	(Scotland) Glasgow Warriors	6	1	8	17	1
73	(England) Ryan Lamb	(England) Gloucester	6	4	13	9	0
67	(South Africa) Marius Goosen	(Italy) Benetton	6	0	5	19	0
65	(Argentina) Felipe Contepomi	(Ireland) Leinster	6	1	6	15	1
65	(England) Andy Goode	(England) Leicester Tigers	6	1	6	16	0
65	(Australia) Brock James	(France) Clermont	4	1	12	12	0

=== Top try scorers ===
Player	Club	Tries	Apps
(France) Aurélien Rougerie	(France) Clermont	5	4
(England) Richard Haughton	(England) Saracens	5	5
(France) Vincent Clerc	(France) Toulouse	4	6
(Argentina) Tomás de Vedia	(England) London Irish	4	6
(South Africa) Jaco Erasmus	(Italy) Viadana	4	5
(France) Guilhem Guirado	(France) Perpignan	4	6
(Australia) Peter Hewat	(England) London Irish	4	6
(England) Ryan Lamb	(England) Gloucester	4	5
(Fiji) Kameli Ratuvou	(England) Saracens	4	6
(France) Julien Arias	(France) Stade Français	3	5
(England) Delon Armitage	(England) London Irish	3	6
(Scotland) John Barclay	(Scotland) Glasgow Warriors	3	6
(Italy) Steven Bortolussi	(Italy) Viadana	3	6
(Scotland) Simon Danielli	(Ireland) Ulster	3	5
(Wales) Sonny Parker	(Wales) Ospreys	3	5
(England) James Simpson-Daniel	(England) Gloucester	3	5
(England) Richard Thorpe	(England) London Irish	3	5
