= Donncha O'Callaghan =

Irish rugby union player (born 1979)

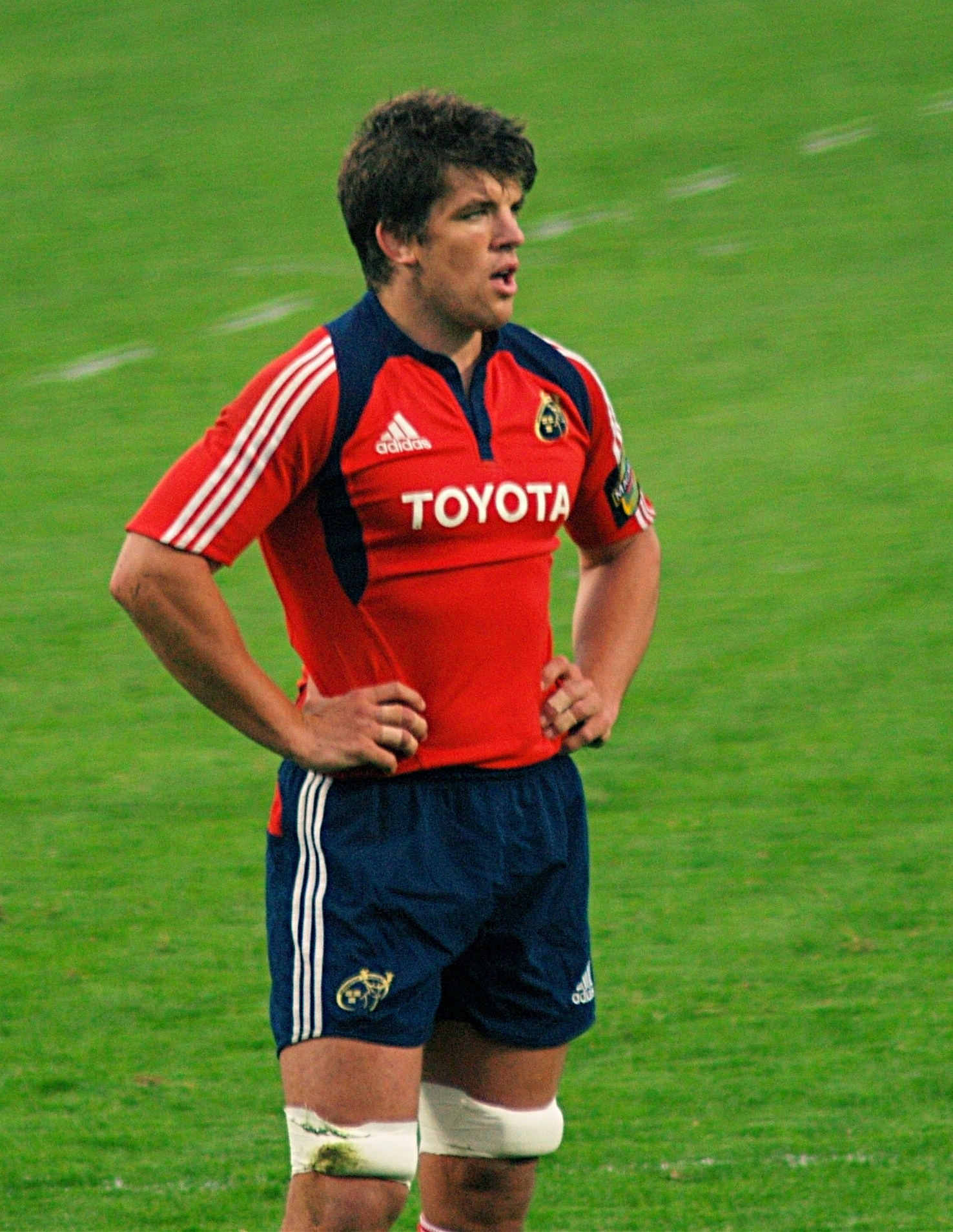
- O'Callaghan playing for Munster in 2009
- Born: Donncha Fintan O'Callaghan; 24 March 1979 (age 47) Cork, Ireland
- Height: 1.98 m (6 ft 6 in)
- Weight: 115 kg (18.1 st; 254 lb)
- School: Christian Brothers College
- University: Cork Institute of Technology
- Notable relative: Ultan O'Callaghan (brother)

Rugby union career
- Position: Lock
Amateur team(s)
Years	Team	Apps	(Points)
1998–2015	Cork Constitution Highfield R.F.C.		
Senior career
Years	Team	Apps	(Points)
1998–2015	Munster	268	(40)
2015–2018	Worcester Warriors	63	(5)
- Correct as of 28 April 2018
International career
Years	Team	Apps	(Points)
2002–2003	Ireland A	7	(0)
2003–2013	Ireland	94	(5)
2005–2009	British & Irish Lions	4	(0)
- Correct as of 10 November 2017

Donncha O'Callaghan (born 24 March 1979) is an Irish retired rugby union player. He spent most of his career with his home province Munster, spending 17 seasons with the province and winning five major trophies, before finishing his career with Worcester Warriors in the English Premiership. Internationally, O'Callaghan represented Ireland and was part of the team that won the Six Nations grand slam in 2009. He also toured with the British & Irish Lions in 2005 and 2009, winning 4 caps. Throughout his career, O'Callaghan played primarily as a lock, though he occasionally provided cover at blindside flanker.

== Youth rugby ==
O'Callaghan began his rugby education in Highfield Rugby Club, on the Model Farm Road in Cork. During the 1997–98 season he won a Munster Schools Senior Cup with Christian Brothers College, Cork, beating St. Munchin's College, Limerick (a team including Jerry Flannery and Jeremy Staunton) in the final at Musgrave Park. The same year, he also played for the Irish Schoolboys team. The following year he was part of the U-19 World Championship winning team, along with Brian O'Driscoll and Paddy Wallace.

== Professional career ==
=== Munster ===
O'Callaghan made his Munster debut on 4 September 1998, starting against Ulster in an Irish Inter-Provincial match.

O'Callaghan started for Munster in their 37–17 Celtic League Final victory against Neath on 1 February 2003. O'Callaghan also started for Munster in their 27–16 Celtic Cup Final against Llanelli Scarlets on 14 May 2005.

O'Callaghan was part of the Munster team that won the 2005–06 Heineken Cup, scoring a try in the win against Castres Olympique in the pool stage He started for Munster in their 19–23 2006 Heineken Cup Final victory against Biarritz Olympique on 20 May 2006, O'Callaghan's and Munster's first European success.

O'Callaghan scored a try after a 55m run in the first game of their Heineken Cup defence against Leicester Tigers at Welford Road Stadium. He scored another try against Bourgoin at Thomond Park in their first home game since winning the Heineken Cup.

O'Callaghan was also a part of the Munster team which won the 2007–08 Heineken Cup, starting the 16–13 2008 Heineken Cup Final victory against Toulouse on 24 May 2008. He was also part of the Munster team that won the 2008–09 Celtic League.

On 11 November 2010, O'Callaghan committed his future to the province when he signed a new three-year contract, finishing in 2014. He started against Leinster in Munster's 19–9 2011 Magners League Grand Final victory on 28 May 2011. O'Callaghan became the ninth Munster player to reach the 200-caps mark in the league game against Glasgow Warriors on 14 April 2012. O'Callaghan signed a contract extension with Munster in November 2013, which will see him remain with the province until June 2016. On 15 February 2014, O'Callaghan made history when he came off the bench for Munster against Zebre to earn his 241st cap, overtaking the record for Munster appearances previously held by Ronan O'Gara. O'Callaghan was nominated for the IRUPA Medal for Excellence 2014 award on 23 April 2014. He missed out on this award, but did win the inaugural Contribution to Society Award for his work with UNICEF.

O'Callaghan captained Munster in their 13–14 defeat against Edinburgh on 5 September 2014.

=== Worcester Warriors ===
On 3 September 2015, it was announced that O'Callaghan had been granted an early release from his Munster contract to join English Aviva Premiership side Worcester Warriors on a two-year contract. On 5 December 2015, O'Callaghan received the first red card of his career during Worcester's game against Leicester Tigers. In his first season with the club, O'Callaghan played in every Premiership game and was named the Supporters Club Player of the Season for 2016. In January 2017, O'Callaghan captained with Worcester for the first during their 2016–17 European Rugby Challenge Cup fixture against Russian side Enisei-STM. Following that, new Director of Rugby Gary Gold also made O'Callaghan the club's Premiership captain. He signed a one-year contract extension in April 2017. O'Callaghan retired from rugby after captaining Worcester to a 44–13 win Harlequins on 28 April 2018, a result that ensured Worcester remained in the Premiership for the following season.

== International career ==
=== Ireland ===
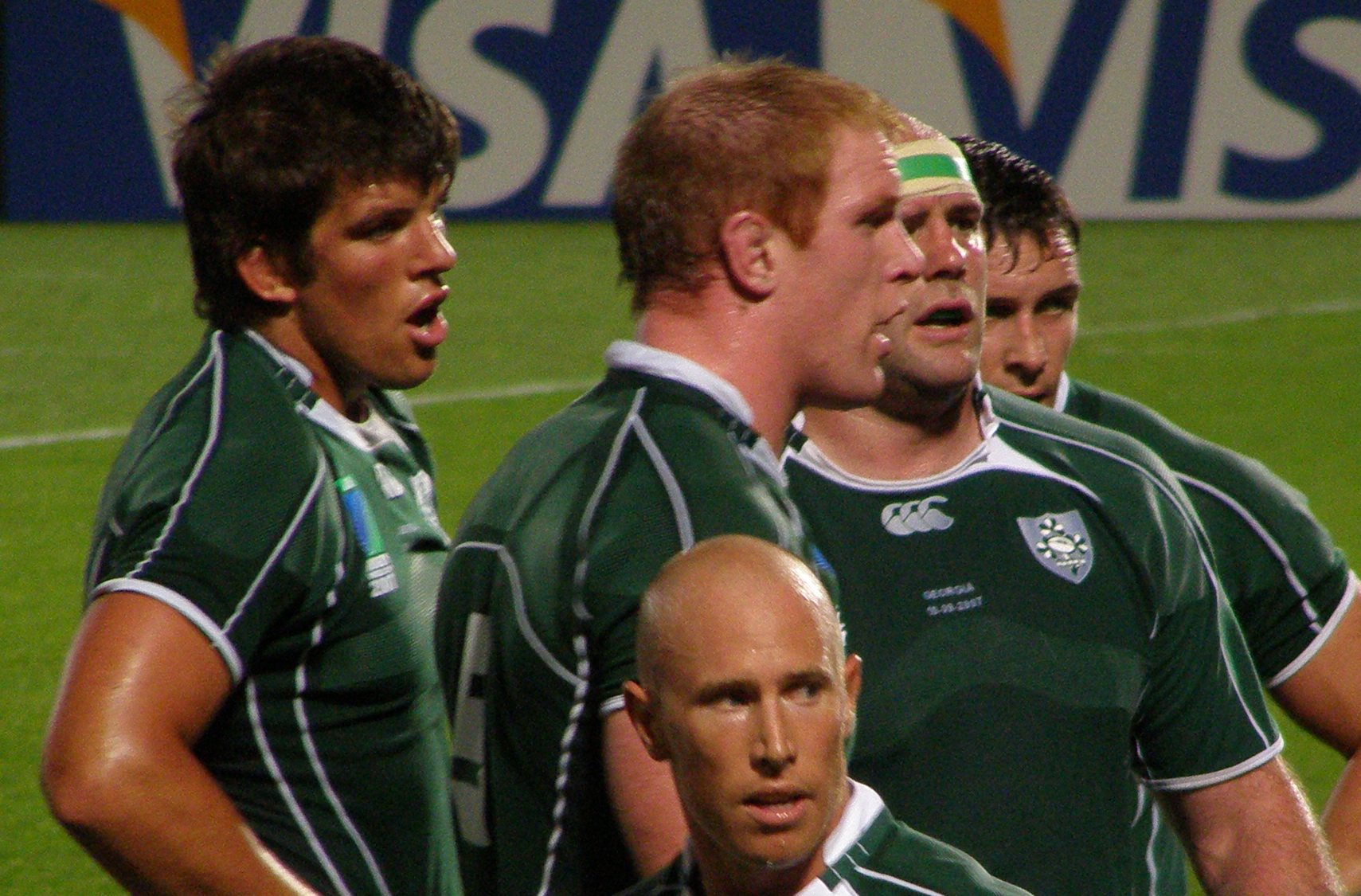
O'Callaghan playing against Georgia at the 2007 Rugby World Cup (far left)

O'Callaghan made his international debut for Ireland on 22 March 2003, coming on as a replacement against Wales at the Millennium Stadium during the 2003 Six Nations Championship. O’Callaghan made his debut on the 18th anniversary of his Dad’s passing, to make it even more poignant he also wore the number 18 jersey.

O'Callaghan was selected in Ireland's squad for the 2003 Rugby World Cup, playing against Romania in the pool stage and against Australia in the 17–16 defeat in the final pool game.

O'Callaghan was part of the Ireland team that won the Triple Crown in the 2004 Six Nations Championship, Ireland's first Triple Crown in 19 years.

O'Callaghan played in all of Ireland's 2005 Autumn Tests when Paul O'Connell was injured.

O'Callaghan scored his first international try in a match against France in the 43–31 loss in Paris in the 2006 Six Nations Championship. O'Callaghan was also part of the Ireland team that won further Triple Crowns in 2006 and 2007.

O'Callaghan was part of the Irish team which won the Grand Slam in the 2009 Six Nations Championship, Ireland's first in 61 years.

O'Callaghan featured in all of Ireland's tests in the 2009 November Tests, starting against Australia, coming on as a replacement against Fiji and starting the 15–10 victory against South Africa.

O'Callaghan missed the first two games of the 2010 Six Nations Championship, but returned against England and went on to start against Wales. and Scotland. O'Callaghan also started against New Zealand and Australia in Ireland's 2010 Summer Tests. He also started against South Africa in Ireland's opening game of the 2010 November Tests, also starting against Samoa, New Zealand and Argentina.

O'Callaghan started against Italy in Ireland's first game of the 2011 Six Nations Championship, and went on to start against France, Scotland, Wales and England.

O'Callaghan was selected in Ireland's training squad for the 2011 Rugby World Cup warm-ups in August, starting both tests against France and the test against England. He was selected in the 30-man squad to go to New Zealand, starting the pool stage victories against USA, Australia, Russia and Italy, and also starting the quarter-final defeat to Wales.

O'Callaghan was selected in Ireland's 24-man squad for the 2012 Six Nations Championship. He started against Wales, Italy, France, Scotland and England. O'Callaghan featured in all of Ireland's tests in the 2012 tour of New Zealand, coming off the bench in the first, second and third tests. He also featured in the 2012 Autumn Tests against South Africa and Argentina, earning his 90th cap for Ireland in the Argentina test.

O'Callaghan was named in Ireland's training squad for the 2013 Six Nations Championship on 17 January 2013, and came off the bench against Wales and England. An injury to Mike McCarthy meant that O'Callaghan was promoted to the starting XV for Ireland's game against Scotland on 24 February 2013. McCarthy's return from injury relegated O'Callaghan to another bench appearance in the 13–13 draw with France. O'Callaghan was then dropped from the international side, with Leinster's Devin Toner being preferred for the place on the bench against Italy.

O'Callaghan was added to the Ireland squad for the 2013 Autumn Tests on 28 October 2013. He was left out of the squad for the 2014 Six Nations Championship.

=== British & Irish Lions ===
O'Callaghan was selected in Sir Clive Woodward's squad for the 2005 British & Irish Lions tour to New Zealand on 11 April 2005. He started for the Lions in a test match against Argentina on 23 May 2005. He started the 48–18 second test defeat alongside Munster and Ireland colleague Paul O'Connell. He continued with O'Connell for the third test defeat as well.

O'Callaghan was also selected in Sir Ian McGeechan's squad for the 2009 British & Irish Lions tour to South Africa. He captained the mid-week Lions team to victory over Southern Kings on 16 June 2009. He came off the bench in the first test defeat, his only test appearance on the tour.

=== Barbarians ===
O'Callaghan was selected in the Barbarians squad to play England on 26 May 2014.

== Broadcasting and other activities ==
O'Callaghan has been an ambassador for UNICEF Ireland since July 2009 and has made visits to South Africa, Haiti, Zimbabwe, Lebanon, and Syria with UNICEF.

O'Callaghan released an autobiography in October 2011, called Joking Apart: My Autobiography.

In 2015, he joined Ireland's Fittest Family as a coach for series 5. As of 2025, he remained as a coach on the show.

In May 2021, he was announced as one of the new presenters of The RTÉ 2fm Breakfast Show alongside Doireann Garrihy and Carl Mullan, which began on 31 May. In mid-2024, O'Callaghan announced his departure from the 2fm Breakfast Show.

O'Callaghan has also been involved in other RTÉ television programs.

== Personal life ==
O'Callaghan attended Christian Brothers College, Cork. He is the younger brother of Ultan O'Callaghan, former Munster player and coach and now Domestic Rugby Manager at Munster Rugby, and cousin of the former Cork City F.C. footballer George O'Callaghan.

On 23 December 2009, O'Callaghan married his longtime girlfriend, Jennifer Harte, at St. Columba's Church in Douglas, Cork.

In August 2010, O'Callaghan's wife gave birth to their first child, a girl. The couple had a second daughter in September 2012. Their third daughter was born in October 2013. The couple had a fourth child, a son, in September 2015.

== Statistics ==
=== International analysis by opposition ===
Against	Played	Won	Lost	Drawn	Tries	Points	% Won
Argentina	5	3	1	1	0	0	60
Australia	8	2	5	1	0	0	25
Canada	1	1	0	0	0	0	100
England	9	5	4	0	0	0	55.56
Fiji	1	1	0	0	0	0	100
France	11	1	8	2	1	5	9.09
Georgia	1	1	0	0	0	0	100
Italy	11	11	0	0	0	0	100
Namibia	1	1	0	0	0	0	100
New Zealand*	12	0	12	0	0	0	0
Pacific Islanders	1	1	0	0	0	0	100
Romania	2	2	0	0	0	0	100
Russia	1	1	0	0	0	0	100
Samoa	2	2	0	0	0	0	100
Scotland	10	8	2	0	0	0	80
South Africa*	6	2	4	0	0	0	33.33
Tonga	1	1	0	0	0	0	100
United States	2	2	0	0	0	0	100
Wales	13	8	5	0	0	0	61.54
Total	98	53	41	4	1	5	54.08

Correct as of 4 July 2017 * indicates inclusion of caps for British & Irish Lions

== Honours ==
=== Munster ===
- European Rugby Champions Cup:
  - Winner (2): 2005–06, 2007–08
- United Rugby Championship:
  - Winner (3): 2002–03, 2008–09, 2010–11
- Celtic Cup:
  - Winner (1): 2004–05

=== Ireland ===
- Six Nations Championship:
  - Winner (1): 2009
- Grand Slam:
  - Winner (1): 2009
- Triple Crown:
  - Winner (4): 2004, 2006, 2007, 2009

=== British & Irish Lions ===
- British & Irish Lions tours:
  - Tourist (2): 2005, 2009
