= Alan Quinlan =

Irish rugby union player

- Born: 13 July 1974 (age 52) Tipperary, Ireland
- Height: 1.91 m (6 ft 3 in)
- Weight: 105 kg (16.5 st; 231 lb)
- University: Setanta College

Rugby union career
- Position: Back-Row
Amateur team(s)
Years	Team	Apps	(Points)
- Clanwilliam
1994–2011	Shannon		
Senior career
Years	Team	Apps	(Points)
1996–2011	Munster	212	(165)
- Correct as of 11 June 2011
International career
Years	Team	Apps	(Points)
1999–2008	Ireland	27	(30)
- Correct as of 15 September 2010

Alan Quinlan (Irish: Ailín Ó Caoindealbhain, born 13 July 1974) is a retired Irish rugby union player. He played for Munster and was registered to All-Ireland League side Shannon. He retired from rugby in May 2011.

== Early years ==
Quinlan was educated at Abbey CBS in Tipperary and worked for a motor dealer after leaving school. He began his rugby career with Clanwilliam FC. Quinlan moved from Clanwilliam to join Shannon U20s in 1994. He captained the Irish Youth Team against Scotland in 1993. He normally played as a blindside flanker, but he also played openside, number eight and second row for Munster.

== Munster ==
Quinlan began playing for Munster in 1996 and captained the youths team before becoming a regular in the first team. In May 2006 he made a comeback from a cruciate ligament injury earlier in the season to win both the AIB League Division 1 title with Shannon and the Heineken Cup with Munster after a late appearance from the bench in the 2006 Heineken Cup Final win over Biarritz in Cardiff. He captained the side from Number Eight in Munster's upset victory over Ulster in Ravenhill in the 2007 Celtic League. Quinlan was voted Man of the Match as Munster beat Toulouse 16–13 on 24 May 2008 to win the 2008 Heineken Cup Final. He was part of the squad that won the 2008–09 Celtic League. In total he holds five league medals with Shannon, as well as two Heineken Cup medals and a Celtic League Medal with Munster. Quinlan won his 201st cap against Leinster, equalling Anthony Foley's club record for caps, on 2 October 2010. He became Munster's most capped player ever on 16 October 2010, against Toulon in the Heineken Cup. In the 2009–10 season he represented Munster 21 times, including all eight of their 2010 Heineken Cup matches.

In April 2011, Quinlan officially announced his retirement from professional rugby, to be effective at the end of the 2010-11 season. He played his last game for Munster on 6 May 2011, against Connacht in the 2010–11 Celtic League, scoring a try to mark the end of his remarkable career and going off to a standing ovation from the Munster and Connacht supporters. He joined the Munster team at the 2011 Celtic League Grand Final trophy presentation, celebrating Munster's 19–9 victory over old rivals Leinster in Thomond Park.

== Ireland ==
Quinlan represented Ireland 'A' between 1998 and 2001 and made his senior debut for the Irish national team in October 1999, as a replacement in a test against Romania. He played his first Six Nations match against Italy in 2001 in a 41-22 win. He was a part of Ireland's squad at the 2003 World Cup in Australia and scored two tries in the tournament before dislocating his shoulder scoring a vital try against Argentina in the pool stages on 26 October, which ended his involvement. He was named in Ireland's 2007 World Cup squad but did not make any appearances. Quinlan took his caps to a total of 27 by playing in the Autumn Internationals of 2008 against Canada and the All Blacks.

== British & Irish Lions ==
On 21 April 2009, Quinlan was named in the squad for the 2009 Lions tour of South Africa. During Munsters Heineken cup semi-final defeat to Leinster in May 2009, Quinlan was cited for making contact with the eye or eye area of Leinster captain Leo Cullen. The offence was deemed at the low range of seriousness and he received a 12 playing week ban until 9 September 2009. As a result, he missed the Lions tour to South Africa.

== Post-retirement ==
Quinlan was a co-commentator for ITV's coverage of the 2011 World Cup. He regularly commentates with RTÉ and Sky Sports on their rugby coverage.

== Personal life ==
Quinlan married Irish model Ruth Griffin in Tipperary town during the summer of 2008. They have one son named AJ who was born in January 2009. They later split up in June 2010.

He released an autobiography, entitled 'Quinlan: Red Blooded', in 2010. Quinlan is a big golf fan and supports Liverpool.

== Statistics ==
=== International analysis by opposition ===
Against	Played	Won	Lost	Drawn	Tries	Points	% Won
Argentina	3	2	1	0	1	5	66.67
Australia	2	1	1	0	0	0	50
Canada	1	1	0	0	1	5	100
England	1	0	1	0	0	0	0
Fiji	1	1	0	0	0	0	100
France	2	2	0	0	0	0	100
Georgia	1	1	0	0	1	5	100
Italy	2	2	0	0	0	0	100
Japan	2	2	0	0	0	0	100
Namibia	1	1	0	0	2	10	100
New Zealand	2	0	2	0	0	0	0
Romania	2	2	0	0	0	0	100
Russia	1	1	0	0	0	0	100
Scotland	2	1	1	0	0	0	50
South Africa	2	0	2	0	0	0	0
Wales	2	2	0	0	1	5	100
Total	27	19	8	0	6	30	70.37

Correct as of 5 July 2017

=== Honours ===
Munster

- European Rugby Champions Cup:
  - Winner (2): 2005–06, 2007–08
- United Rugby Championship:
  - Winner (2): 2002–03, 2008–09
- Celtic Cup:
  - Winner (1): 2004–05
