= Manu Ahotaeiloa =

Tongan rugby union player

- Born: January 12, 1986 (age 40) Tonga
- Height: 1.85 m (6 ft 1 in)
- Weight: 95 kg (209 lb)

Rugby union career
- Position: Centre
Senior career
Years	Team	Apps	(Points)
2005-07	Agen	44	(30)
2007-08	Toulouse	15	(15)
2008-09	Agen	15	(5)
2008-10	Toulouse	24	(10)
2010-2012	Agen	46	(10)
2012-2014	Aviron Bayonnais	35	(5)
2014-2015	Lille Metropole	19	(10)
2015-2016	Union Bordeaux Bègles	3	(0)
2016-2017	Stade Olympique Chambérien Rugby	17	(15)

Manu Ahotaeiloa (born 12 January 1986) is a Tongan rugby union player who currently plays for Agen in the Top 14 competition. He plays as a centre.
