= Jean Bouilhou =

France international rugby union player (born 1978)

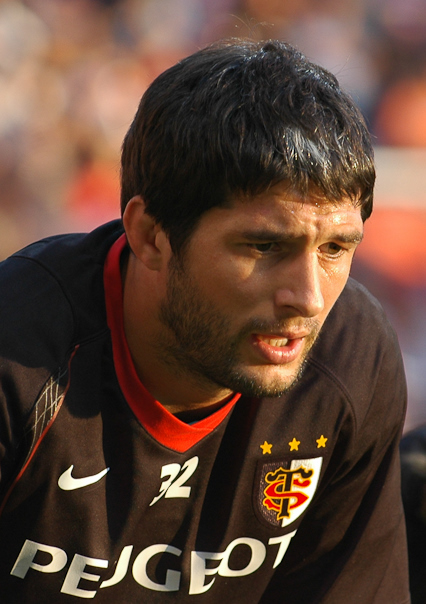
- Born: 7 December 1978 (age 47) Pau, France
- Height: 1.92 m (6 ft 4 in)
- Weight: 100 kg (15 st 10 lb)

Rugby union career
- Position: Flanker
- Current team: Toulouse
Senior career
Years	Team	Apps	(Points)
1999–2013	Toulouse	392	(112)
2013–2016	Pau	65	(20)
International career
Years	Team	Apps	(Points)
2001–2003	France	2	(0)

Jean Bouilhou (born 7 December 1978) was a rugby union player who played as a flanker. Whilst at Toulouse he won the Heineken Cup three times in 2003, 2005 and 2010, starting in the 2003 and 2010 finals and featuring as a replacement in 2005.
