= Yves Donguy =

Ivoirien rugby union player

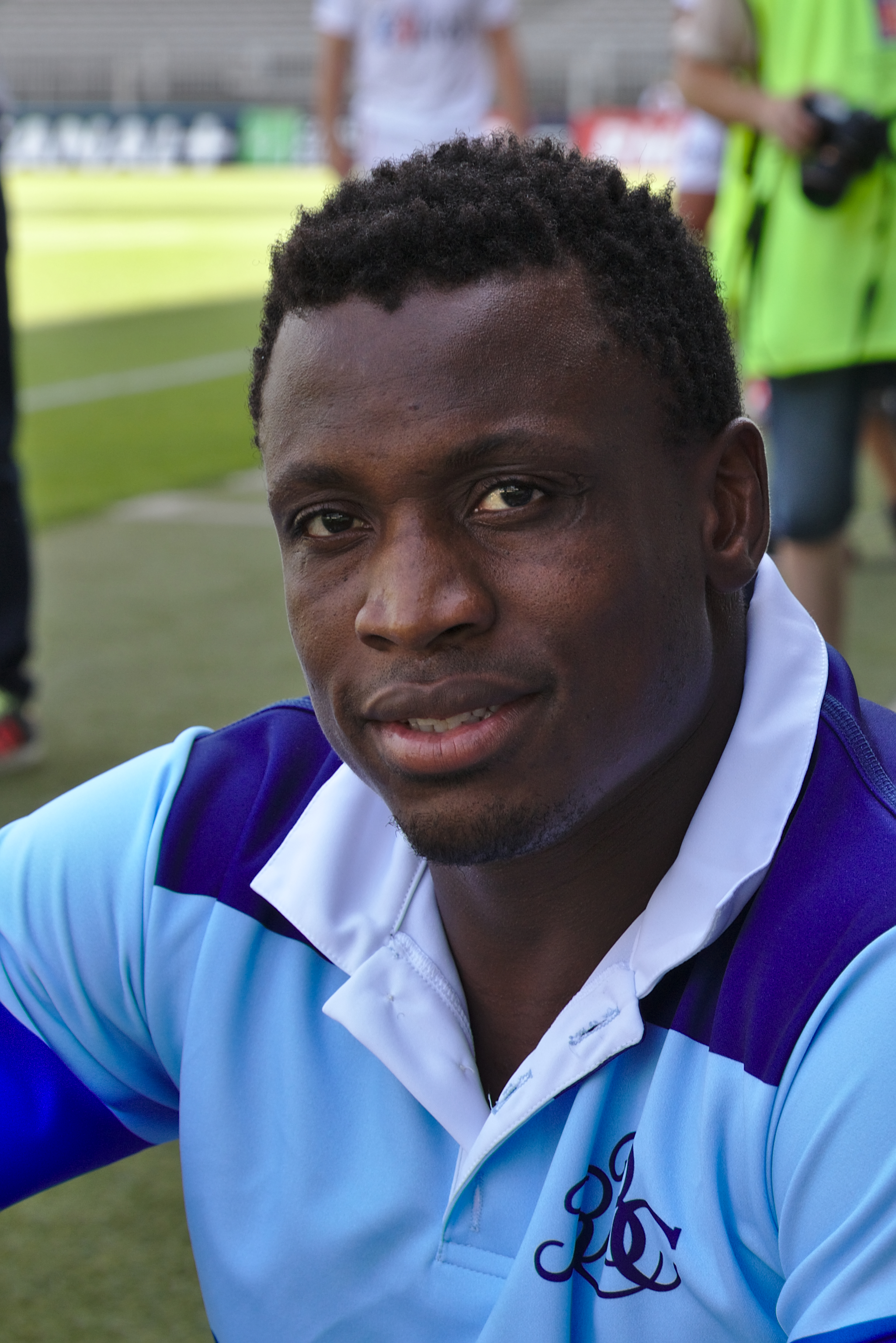
- Born: 1 January 1982 (age 44) Daloa, Côte d'Ivoire

Rugby union career
- Position: wing
Senior career
Years	Team	Apps	(Points)
2000	AC Bobigny		
2000–2007	Brive		
2007-	Toulouse		
- Correct as of 4 May 2012

Yves Donguy (born 1 January 1982 in Daloa, Côte d'Ivoire) is a rugby union player for Toulouse in the Top 14 competition. He plays on the wing.

He played in the Heineken Cup Final 2008.

He arrived in France at 6 years old. He started rugby in Bobigny, Seine-Saint-Denis (Partner club CA Brive).

== Career ==
- Until 2000 : AC Bobigny (Federal 1)
- 2000-2007 : CA Brive
- Since 2007 : Stade Toulousain

== Honours ==
- Champion of France with the Stade Toulousain (2007–2008)
- Champion of France with the Stade Toulousain (2010–2011)
- Heineken Cup finalist with the Stade Toulousain (2007–2008)
- Heineken Cup winner with the Stade toulousain (2009–2010)
