= Denis Leamy =

Irish rugby union player and coach

- Born: Denis Patrick Leamy; 27 November 1981 (age 44) Cashel, Ireland
- Height: 1.88 m (6 ft 2 in)
- Weight: 108 kg (17.0 st; 238 lb)
- School: Rockwell College
- University: Setanta College

Rugby union career
- Position(s): Flanker, Number 8, Centre
Amateur team(s)
Years	Team	Apps	(Points)
1994–1995	Cashel		
1996–2002	Rockwell		
2002–2012	UCC		
Senior career
Years	Team	Apps	(Points)
2002–2012	Munster	145	(150)
- Correct as of 19 December 2011
International career
Years	Team	Apps	(Points)
2004–2011	Ireland	57	(10)
- Correct as of 8 October 2011

Denis Patrick Leamy (born 27 November 1981) is an Irish former rugby union player who is currently part of the coaching team with Munster. He was a back-row forward who could play either flanker or at number 8, and occasionally played at centre. He ended his club rugby career for Munster in the Pro12 and Heineken Cup, and internationally for Ireland. He officially announced his retirement in May 2012 due to a long-standing hip injury.

== Schools career ==
Leamy's first sport was hurling and he initially dreamed of following in the footsteps of his heroes Nicky English or Pat Fox. He played for his local GAA side, Boherlahan-Dualla, where his early physical strength was noted. His initial introduction to rugby was somewhat accidental, and occurred when he accompanied his two brothers, Ed and Kev, along to a trial game with his local rugby club, Cashel RFC. He harboured some initial reservations, but despite that he joined in the game and kept going back to play at the club.

A neighbour and family friend recommended that he change schools to join Rockwell College, a school heavily focused on rugby. Leamy gave up on hurling when he was 18, concentrating instead on rugby and a possible professional career.

Leamy enrolled in Rockwell College when he was 15. In his first year there, he was heavily involved in their successful march on the Munster Schools Junior Cup in 1997. He played for Rockwell Senior Cup Team for three years, the first of which he played at inside centre, before switching back to his more favoured backrow position of number 8. During this time, he was called to Clongowes for trials for the Ireland Schools team and ended up playing a key role in the Irish Schools' tour of Australia in 2000 when they won all eight games.

== Under-21 international honours ==
Leamy acquired a reputation after an incident with a player from Old Belvedere. A second incident resulted in a citation and a suspension, and it was due to this citing that Leamy missed an U21 game against Wales. Leamy captained the side in their final match against France. Leamy moved on from his international schools career to be picked for the Ireland U21 team, where he was capped. He was involved in another incident, again being cited, and this citation meant that Leamy was banned from attending the U21 World Cup. Leamy's temper was given further ammunition during the same season when he was playing for UCC in Division 2 of the AIL. Leamy was cited and punished for an incident in a game against Terenure College RFC, before returning that year.

== Provincial honours ==
After finishing school in Rockwell, Leamy went to CIT to study Leisure Management, and started to play for UCC in the second division of the AIL. Declan Kidney brought him into the Munster setup on a development contract and he was awarded his first Munster cap at the age of 19. In the 2003/2004 season, Leamy moved from a development contract to a full-time contract.

The highlights of Leamy's career with Munster is undoubtedly winning the Heineken Cup twice, first in 2006 and then again in 2008, scoring a try in the final. He was also the province's top try scorer in the 2006/2007 season with 7 tries. He captained Munster for part of the 2010–11 season in the absence of Paul O'Connell.

== Senior international honours ==
Leamy was selected in the Ireland Squad in November 2004. He played against the US Eagles, and played at Number 8 for Ireland for the first time in a 7–45 drubbing by New Zealand. In the following year, Leamy made his Six Nations debut against Italy, this time in the number 7 jersey.

As Leamy was not selected for the 2009 British and Irish Lions tour of South Africa, he played in Ireland's 2009 Summer Tests. He played against Australia and Fiji in the 2009 November Tests before injury ruled him out of the remaining match against South Africa. He missed the 2010 Six Nations and Summer Tests through injury, but returned to play against Samoa, New Zealand and Argentina in the 2010 November Tests. He played in four of Ireland's 2011 Six Nations games, and won his 50th cap for Ireland when he came on as a replacement against England in March 2011. Leamy was selected in Ireland's training squad for the 2011 World Cup warm-ups in August, and was also selected in the final 30-man squad to travel to New Zealand.

A hip injury ruled Leamy out of action for four months in January 2012, meaning he missed selection for the 2012 Six Nations Championship.

== Retirement ==
Leamy announced his retirement from rugby on 22 May 2012, due to a hip injury suffered during the 2011–12 season.

Speaking at the announcement, Leamy said:

I find it hard to put into words how much it has meant to me to play for Munster and Ireland. It was a dream come true and I was very lucky to play with some of the greatest players ever to wear the jerseys and feel blessed that I was part of winning teams. I've had a great career, wish it had gone on a little longer but I'd like to thank all the coaches, players, medical staff and management who have helped me over the past decade. It's been a great honour to be involved with such an outstanding group of people. I'd also like to thank the fans most sincerely. I fully appreciate the sacrifices they've made, spending their hard earned cash to cheer us on, be it Munster or Ireland, at home games and all over Europe. Their support has been truly fantastic and a memory I'll carry forever.

== Coaching ==
Following his retirement, Leamy moved into coaching, working with Rockwell College, Garryowen and Munster's underage teams, as well as spending time as Cashel RFC's head coach and Clonmel RFC head coach. He was also part of the backroom team for the Tipperary side that won the 2016 All-Ireland Senior Hurling Championship Final. Leamy joined Leinster Rugby as an elite player development officer in October 2019, and joined the Ireland national under-20 rugby union team as their forwards coach in January 2021. He was promoted to Leinster's senior coaching team as a contact skills coach in October 2021. Leamy returned to his home province Munster to take up the defence coach role vacated by JP Ferreira on a three-year contract from the 2022–23 season. This has since been extended by a further 2 years.

== Personal life ==
Leamy married Gráinne Brosnahan, his partner of three years, in September 2013.

== Statistics ==
=== International analysis by opposition ===
Against	Played	Won	Lost	Drawn	Tries	Points	% Won
Argentina	2	1	1	0	0	0	50
Australia	5	1	3	1	1	5	20
Canada	1	1	0	0	0	0	100
England	6	4	2	0	1	5	66.67
Fiji	1	1	0	0	0	0	100
France	6	1	5	0	0	0	20
Georgia	1	1	0	0	0	0	100
Italy	8	8	0	0	0	0	100
Japan	1	1	0	0	0	0	100
Namibia	1	1	0	0	0	0	100
New Zealand	5	0	5	0	0	0	0
Pacific Islanders	1	1	0	0	0	0	100
Romania	1	1	0	0	0	0	100
Russia	1	1	0	0	0	0	100
Samoa	1	1	0	0	0	0	100
Scotland	6	5	1	0	0	0	83.33
South Africa	1	1	0	0	0	0	100
United States	3	3	0	0	0	0	100
Wales	6	3	3	0	0	0	50
Total	57	36	20	1	2	10	63.16

Correct as of 5 July 2017
