= Ronan O'Gara =

Irish rugby union coach & player (born 1977)

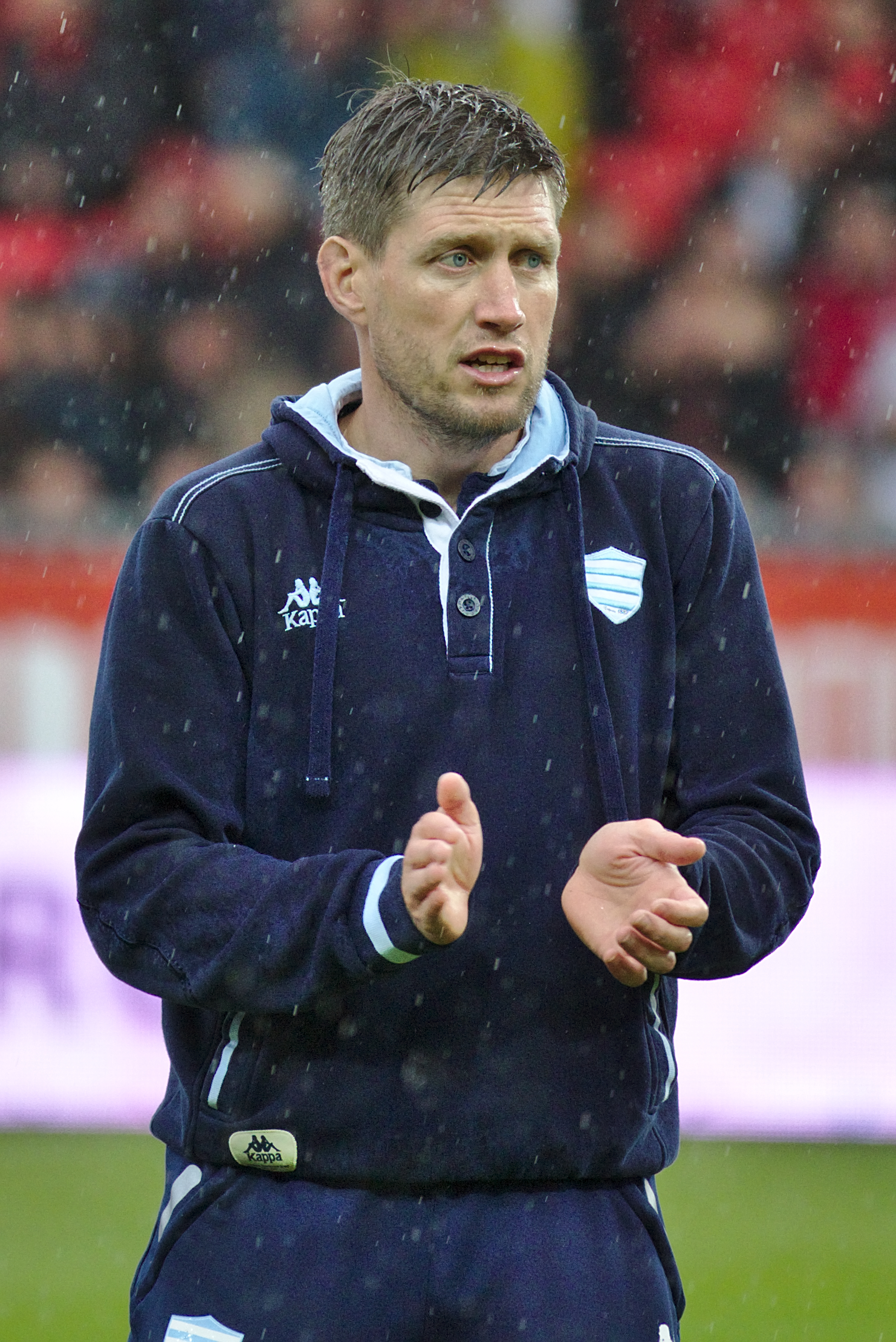
- O'Gara in 2015
- Born: Ronan John Ross O'Gara; 7 March 1977 (age 49) San Diego, California, U.S.
- Height: 1.83 m (6 ft 0 in)
- School: Presentation Brothers College
- University: University College Cork

Rugby union career
- Position: Fly-half
Amateur team(s)
Years	Team	Apps	(Points)
1995–1996	UCC	5	(54)
1996–2003	Cork Constitution	64	(714)
Senior career
Years	Team	Apps	(Points)
1997–2013	Munster	240	(2,625)
- Correct as of 27 April 2013
International career
Years	Team	Apps	(Points)
1999	Ireland A	1	(0)
2000–2013	Ireland	128	(1,083)
2001–2009	British & Irish Lions	2	(0)
- Correct as of 24 February 2013
Coaching career
- Years: Team
- 2013–2017: Racing 92 (Defence coach)
- 2018–2019: Crusaders (Assistant coach)
- 2019–: La Rochelle (Head coach)

Ronan John Ross O'Gara (born 7 March 1977) is an Irish rugby union coach. O'Gara played as a fly-half and is Ireland's third most-capped player and second highest points scorer. He is head coach of Stade Rochelais in the French Top 14.

O'Gara won 128 caps for Ireland, winning three Triple Crowns and the Grand Slam in 2009. He also played on three British & Irish Lions tours, winning two caps. He played for sixteen seasons with Munster, with whom he won two Heineken Cups.

O'Gara is the tenth most-capped and is the sixth highest points scorer in the history of test rugby. He is Munster's all-time leading scorer, and holds the Heineken Cup record for points and caps. O'Gara scored match-winning drop goals for Munster and Ireland, including in the Wales vs Ireland match in the 2009 Six Nations Championship, in which Ireland won the Grand Slam.

After retiring from playing, O'Gara coached Racing 92’s defence in 2013. He became Crusaders‘s assistant defence coach in 2018. O'Gara became head coach of Stade Rochelais one year later, guiding them to three European Cup finals. The club beat Leinster in both the 2022 and 2023 finals.

== Early life ==
O'Gara was born in San Diego, California, where his father, Fergal, was working as a post–doctoral fellow in microbiology. His father had also played wing for the UCG club in Connacht. His family moved back to Ireland when he was six months old.

O'Gara attended Scoil an Spioraid Naoimh primary school, before moving to Bishopstown Community School where his mother was a teacher. His mother is originally from County Mayo. After a year, his parents sent him to Presentation Brothers College, Cork, where he won a Junior Cup medal in 1992 and a Senior Cup medal in 1995. It was at Pres where O'Gara first came into contact with Declan Kidney, who was head of rugby at the school. Kidney would later go on to coach O'Gara with both Munster and Ireland.

O'Gara attended University College Cork and won an All-Ireland Under-20 medal in 1996. He graduated with a B.A. and a master's degree in Business Economics in 1999.

== Munster ==
=== 1997–2007 ===
O'Gara made his Munster debut alongside longtime Munster and Ireland teammate David Wallace against Connacht in August 1997, scoring 19 points. O'Gara's Heineken Cup debut came against Harlequins in September 1997 in the 1997–98 Heineken Cup. O'Gara kicked 15 points, but Munster lost the game 48–40. He started for Munster in the 2000 Heineken Cup Final, which Northampton Saints won 8–9, and again in the 2002 Heineken Cup Final, which Leicester Tigers won 15–9.

O'Gara's last minute conversion against Gloucester on 18 January 2003 helped Munster to a 27-point victory which took them through to the Heineken Cup quarter final; this match has come to be known in Munster folklore as the Miracle Match. He was part of the Munster team that won the 2002–03 Celtic League, starting and scoring 12 points as Munster beat Neath 37–17 in the Millennium Stadium. O'Gara turned down the chance to join the NFL's Miami Dolphins in March 2003. He started when Munster beat Llanelli Scarlets to win the Celtic Cup in May 2005, scoring 17 points in the game.

O'Gara played a key part in Munster's Heineken Cup winning team of 2006. O'Gara had an important role in Munster's semi-final victory over rivals Leinster by scoring 20 points, including a 77th minute try. On 20 May 2006, O'Gara kicked 13 points in Munster's first Heineken Cup Final victory over Biarritz at the Millennium Stadium in Cardiff.

On 22 October 2006, O'Gara kicked a last minute penalty from inside his own half to win Munster a 21–19 victory over Leicester Tigers in the first round of the pool stages at Welford Road. O'Gara scored 15 points during Munster's win in the 2006–07 Heineken Cup pool game against French side Bourgoin on 14 January 2007. He kicked 5 points in Munster's quarter-final defeat to Scarlets on 30 March 2007.

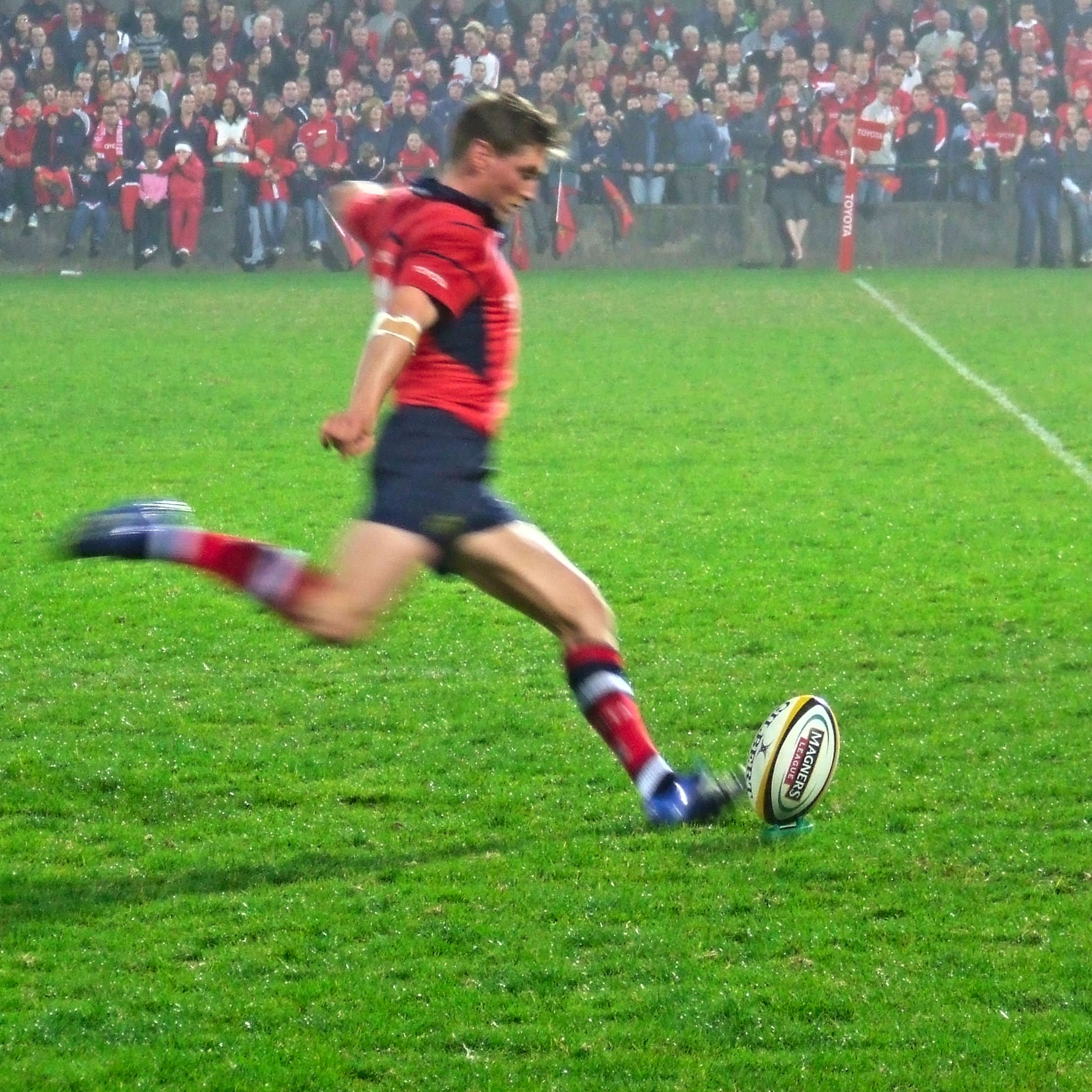
O'Gara kicking for Munster.

=== 2008–2013 ===
On 19 January 2008, O'Gara captained Munster to victory against Wasps in their final pool match of the 2007–08 Heineken Cup, knocking the incumbent champions out and making it through to quarter finals of the cup for the tenth consecutive season. On 24 May 2008, O'Gara won his second Heineken Cup medal as Munster beat Toulouse 16–13 in the 2008 Heineken Cup Final, with O'Gara scoring 11 points.

O'Gara scored a penalty with three minutes left to beat Montauban in the first game of the 2008–09 Heineken Cup and the first Heineken Cup game in the new Thomond Park. On 13 December 2008, O'Gara became the first player to score 1,000 points in the Heineken Cup, when he scored a last minute conversion against Clermont.

On 16 May 2010, O'Gara was awarded the ERC European Player Award, crediting him as the player who had made the greatest contribution to European Rugby during the first 15 years of the Heineken Cup. The selection panel consisted of Sir Ian McGeechan, Lawrence Dallaglio, Ieuan Evans, Fabien Galthié, Donal Lenihan, Michael Lynagh, Stuart Barnes, Stephen Jones and Jacques Verdier.

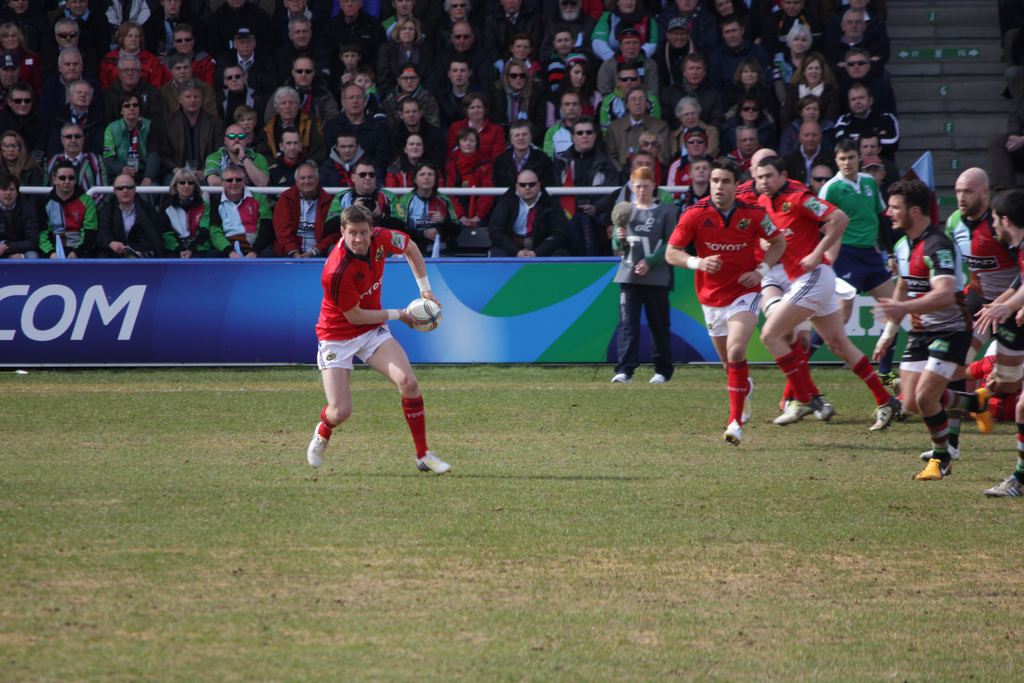
O'Gara playing against Harlequins in 2013.

O'Gara crossed the 2,000-point mark for Munster against Ospreys in a Celtic League game on 18 September 2010. In November 2010, he extended his contract with Munster and the IRFU until 2013. He became the fourth Munster player to win 200 caps in a Celtic League game against Ospreys on 23 April 2011. In May 2011, O'Gara was part of the Munster team that beat arch-rivals and newly crowned Heineken Cup champions Leinster 19–9 in the 2011 Magners League Grand Final at Thomond Park.

On 12 November 2011, O'Gara scored an 84th minute drop-goal after 41 phases of play to secure victory for Munster in their opening 2011–12 Heineken Cup Pool One game against Northampton Saints. A week later, in Munster's second Pool One game away to Castres Olympique, O'Gara again scored a match-winning drop-goal, this time in the 81st minute.

On 10 December 2011, O'Gara became only the second player, the first being his Munster colleague John Hayes, to win 100 caps in the Heineken Cup. He achieved the feat in Munster's third pool game, away to Scarlets, which Munster won 14–17, with O'Gara contributing 12 points with his boot. The following week, O'Gara scored 14 points in the home tie against Scarlets, helping Munster to a 19–13 victory. He became the most capped Heineken Cup player ever on 14 January 2012, when Munster played Castres in Round 5 of the 2011–12 Heineken Cup, scoring 16 points along the way in a 26–10 win for Munster. In Munster's final pool game against Northampton Saints, O'Gara scored 24 points as Munster won 51–36. O'Gara announced in March 2012 that he planned to continue playing rugby until he was 38, quashing rumours of his retirement.

On 13 October 2012, O'Gara scored a penalty and conversion before going off injured in the 34th minute in Munster's 22–17 defeat against Racing Métro 92 in their 2012–13 Heineken Cup opener. As a result, O'Gara missed Munster's bonus-point victory against Edinburgh in Round 2, but he returned and scored 15 points in Munster's next pool game against Saracens, which saw Munster scrape a win. He became Munster's most capped player ever on 5 January 2013, when he won his 233rd cap against Cardiff Blues. O'Gara was cited and banned for one week after kicking Edinburgh's Sean Cox in the Heineken Cup round 4 fixture between the two sides, which ruled him out of Munsters 29–6 victory over Racing Metro which secured qualification from the group stages. He kicked all of Munster's points in their 12–18 Heineken Cup quarter-final victory over Harlequins on 7 April 2013. O'Gara kicked five points for Munster in their 16–10 Heineken Cup semi-final defeat to Clermont Auvergne on 27 April 2013.

O'Gara announced his retirement on 18 May 2013, after weeks of speculation.

== Ireland ==
=== 1999–2003 ===
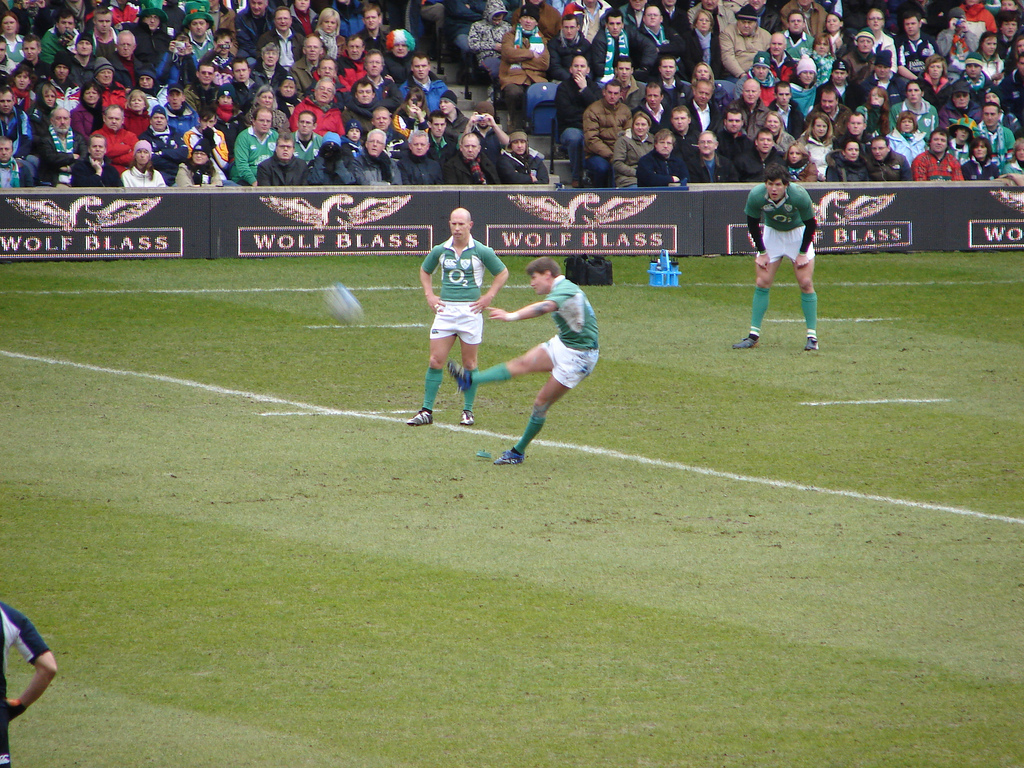
O'Gara kicking against Scotland during the 2007 Six Nations.

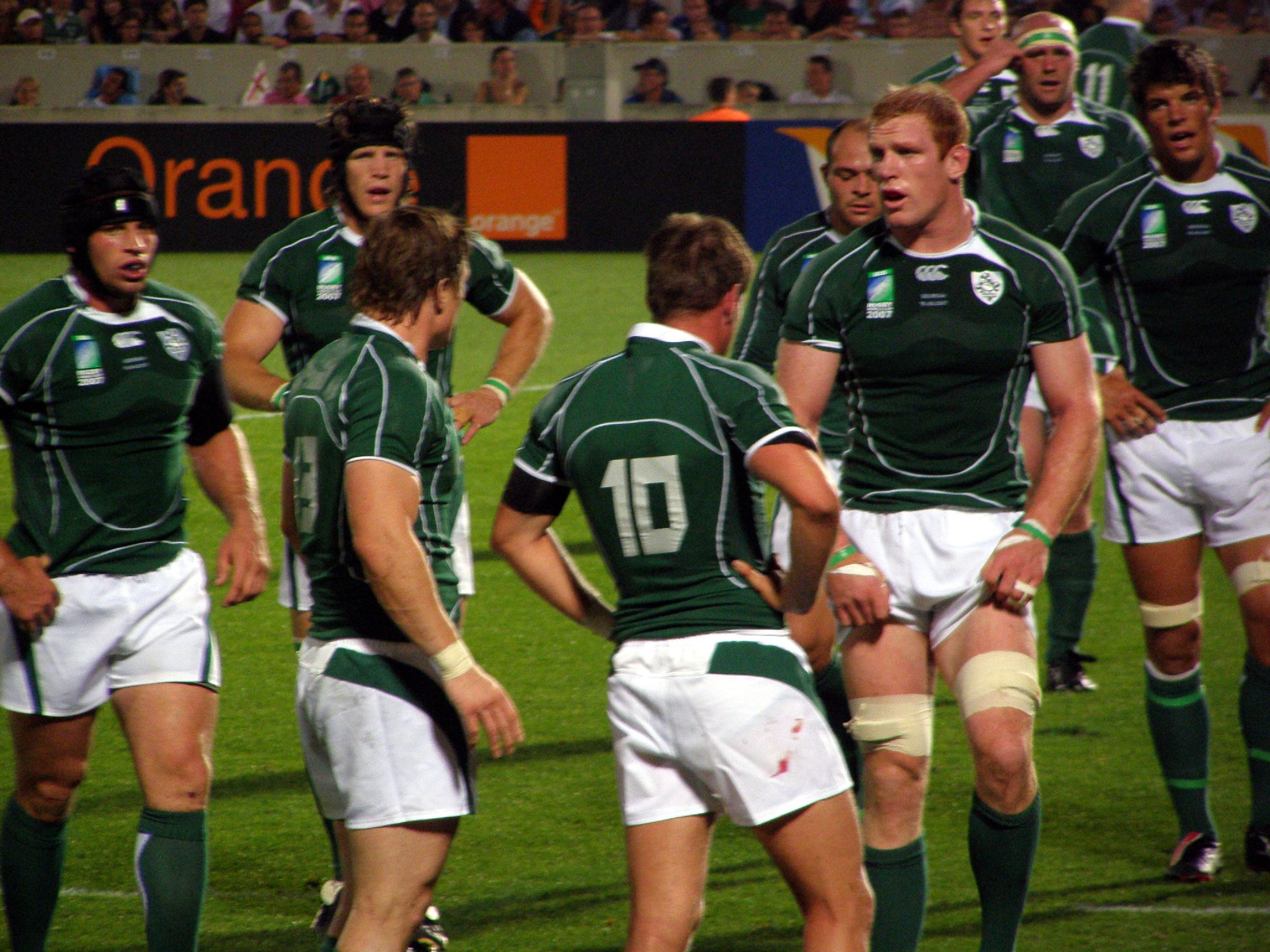
O'Gara during the 2007 World Cup.

O'Gara won a cap for Ireland A on 9 April 1999, against Italy A during a friendly. He was selected in Ireland's preliminary training squad for the 1999 Rugby World Cup, but was not chosen for the tournament, with the Irish management deciding to take two fly-halves and an extra prop instead of three fly-halves. O'Gara was in the Munster team that beat Ireland in a warm-up for the tournament.

O'Gara won his first international cap for Ireland against Scotland on 19 February 2000 during the 2000 Six Nations Championship. O'Gara scored all of Ireland's points in their 18–9 win over Australia at Lansdowne Road in the Autumn Tests of 2002. He was a member of Ireland's 2003 Rugby World Cup squad, and played in all four Pool matches against Romania, Namibia, Argentina and Australia, and in the quarter-final loss to France. In total, O'Gara scored 30 points during his first Rugby World Cup.

=== 2004–2007 ===
O'Gara scored all of Ireland's points in a 17–12 win over South Africa at Lansdowne Road on 13 November 2004. Two weeks later, on 27 November, O'Gara kicked a last-minute drop goal to give Ireland a 21–19 victory over Argentina. O'Gara won the Man of the Match awards against both South Africa and Argentina. In 2004, he was named RTÉ Sports Person of the Year. In 2006, he overtook David Humphreys as Ireland's highest points scorer. In the same season, he won the Triple Crown with Ireland in the 2006 Six Nations Championship.

On 11 February 2007, O'Gara scored the first Irish international try at Croke Park in the 2007 Six Nations Championship loss to France. On 10 March 2007, O'Gara once again scored all of Ireland's points to win the Triple Crown at Murrayfield, beating Scotland 19–18. On 24 August 2007, in Ireland's final 2007 Rugby World Cup warm-up against Italy at Ravenhill in Belfast, O'Gara scored and converted a controversial try nine minutes into stoppage time, winning the match 23–20 after Italy had taken the lead with their own stoppage-time try. O'Gara finished the match with 18 points.

O'Gara was a member of Ireland's 2007 Rugby World Cup squad. He started all four of Ireland's pool games, against Namibia, Georgia, France and Argentina, scoring 19 points in total. Ireland failed to make the quarter finals of the tournament. During the tournament, rumours of a breakdown in his marriage and large gambling debts, both denied by O'Gara, were reported by the French media.

=== 2008–2011 ===
On 11 March 2008, O'Gara was named as Ireland team captain for the first time in his career, leading the side in the Six Nations match against England at Twickenham.

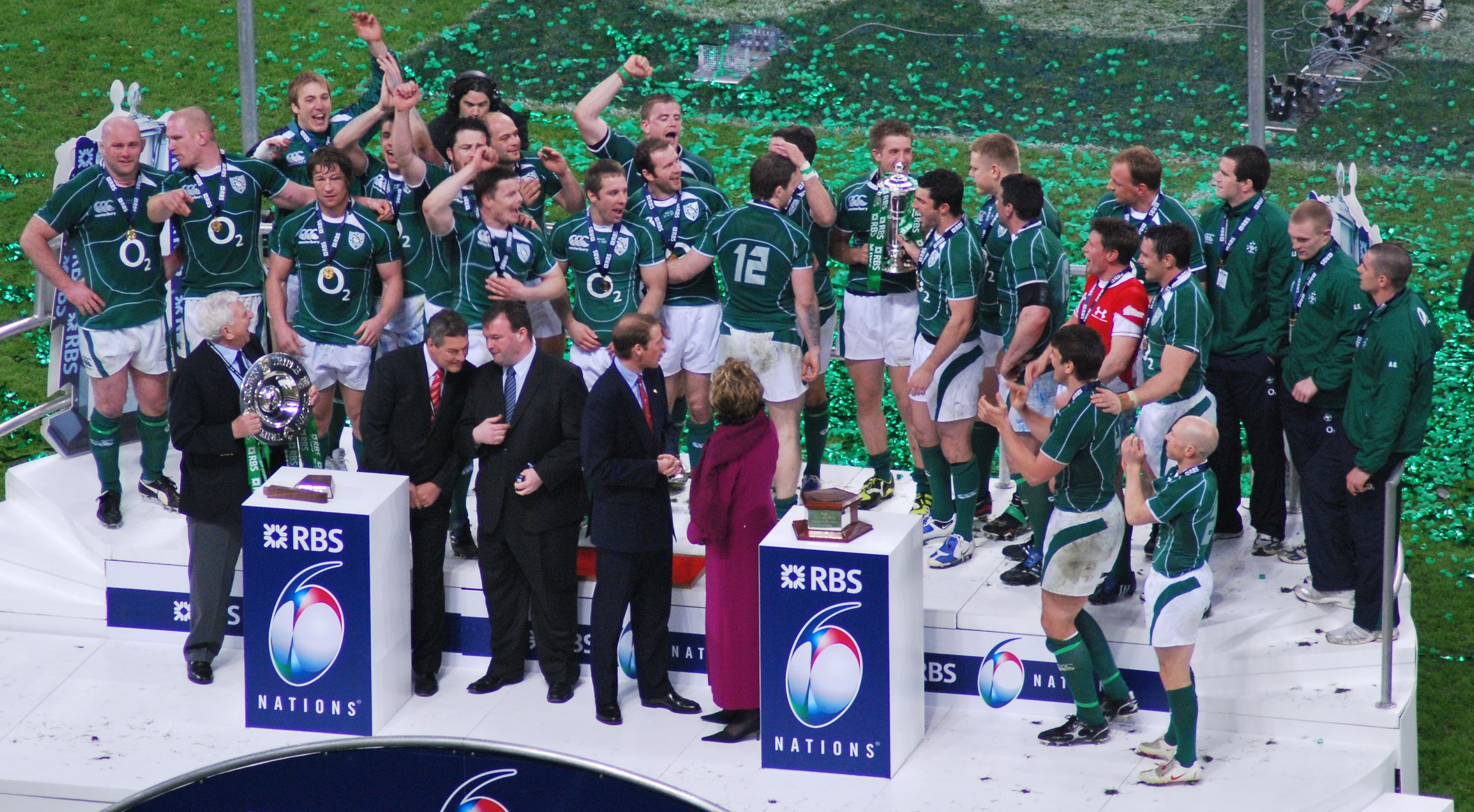
O'Gara (Red jersey) celebrates after winning Ireland's Grand Slam in 2009.

On 14 March 2009, O'Gara overtook Jonny Wilkinson to become the top Six Nations point scorer ever. On 20 March 2009, he scored a late drop goal in the 78th minute to beat Wales and secure for Ireland their first Grand Slam for 61 years. O'Gara started against Australia in the first match of Ireland's 2009 November Series, scoring 10 points. He then lost his place in the starting line-up to Johnny Sexton and did not play against Fiji or South Africa.

O'Gara regained the fly-half spot in Ireland's opening 2010 Six Nations Championship games against Italy and France, but was back on the bench for the remaining three games. He had a 100% kicking record for the 2010 Six Nations. O'Gara was selected in Ireland's squad for their 2010 Summer Tour to New Zealand and Australia, and started against New Zealand, converting 3 tries, but was on the bench for the Australia test. O'Gara became the third Irishman to win 100 caps when he came off the bench during Ireland's first 2010 Autumn Series test against South Africa. He started against Samoa and scored 15 points, including a try. He came off the bench against New Zealand and Argentina.

O'Gara came off the bench against Italy and France in the 2011 Six Nations Championship, and started against Scotland, winning the title of Man of the Match. He started against Wales and became the first Irishman to score over 1,000 points in international matches. He came off the bench against England, as Ireland prevented them from winning a Grand Slam.

O'Gara was selected in Ireland's squad for the 2011 Rugby World Cup. He played in all of Ireland's pool games, coming off the bench against the United States and Australia, and starting against Russia. In the Russia game, he became Ireland's highest points scorer in World Cup matches. He was selected ahead of Johnny Sexton for Ireland's crunch Pool C game against Italy, and scored 16 points as Ireland won 36–6. He retained the fly-half jersey for Ireland's quarter-final against Wales, scoring a penalty and a conversion as Ireland lost 22–10.

In an interview after Ireland's 15–6 World Cup victory over Australia on 17 September 2011, O'Gara hinted at his possible retirement from international rugby after the conclusion of the World Cup, but subsequently said that his words had been misinterpreted.

=== 2012–2013 ===
In the 2012 Six Nations Championship, O'Gara joined Brian O'Driscoll as Ireland's all-time caps leader (with 117) when he came on against Wales on 5 February 2012, during Ireland's opening 2012 Six Nations match. He also became the most capped player in Five/Six Nations history in this game, overtaking fellow Irishman Mike Gibson's record of 56. O'Gara became Ireland's most capped player against Italy on 25 February 2012, overtaking O'Driscoll's record. O'Gara made substitution appearances in all 5 of Ireland's 2012 Six Nations fixtures, a tournament he described as 'gut-wrenching'.

O'Gara came on as a replacement in all three of Ireland's tests against New Zealand in the 2012 tour. O'Gara won his 125th cap for Ireland on 10 November 2012, as a replacement against South Africa.

In the 2013 Six Nations Championship, O'Gara made his first appearance on 10 February 2013, coming on as a replacement against England. He came off the bench against Scotland in round 3, having lost out on the 10 jersey to Paddy Jackson after Johnny Sexton's injury against England. This was his last appearance for Ireland. O'Gara was dropped from the Ireland squad for the game against France, and was also left out of the squad for Ireland's final game against Italy, which Ireland lost 22–15, their only ever defeat to Italy in the Six Nations. O'Gara announced his retirement from all rugby on 18 May 2013.

== British & Irish Lions ==
=== 2001 ===
O'Gara received his first Lions selection for the tour to Australia in 2001. He played in four tour games, against Western Australia, NSW Waratahs, NSW Country Districts and ACT Brumbies, scoring 26 points overall. O'Gara was a substitute in the team that played Australia A. In the game against NSW Waratahs, O'Gara was repeatedly punched by Duncan McRae, which resulted in O'Gara needing eight stitches around his eye and McRae being sent off and later banned for seven weeks. After the game, then Lions coach Graham Henry called the match 'a bad day for rugby'.

=== 2005 ===
O'Gara earned his second Lions call-up for the tour to New Zealand in 2005 On the tour, he played in 6 tour games, against Bay of Plenty, New Zealand Maori, Otago, Southland, Manawatu and Auckland. O'Gara also earned his first Lions test cap, coming on in the third test defeat as a replacement.

=== 2009 ===
O'Gara was named in the Lions squad for the 2009 tour to South Africa. On 30 May he scored 22 points, including a try, in the opening match of the tour against the Royal XV, in a 37–25 win. On 10 June, he played against Sharks, scoring 12 points as the tourists won 39–3. On 16 June, O'Gara was in the Lions team that defeated Southern Kings 20–8. On 23 June, he captained the midweek side in a 13–13 draw against the Emerging Springboks

On 27 June, O'Gara came off the bench in the second test match, winning his second Lions cap. He conceded a seventy-ninth-minute penalty when the score was tied, when he collided with South African scrum-half Fourie du Preez in the air. Morné Steyn scored the penalty, and won the match and the series for the Springboks. O'Gara played 5 games in total on the 2009 tour, scoring 49 points.

== Retirement ==
After Munster's semi-final defeat to ASM Clermont Auvergne in the 2012–13 Heineken Cup, O'Gara's retirement was confirmed on 18 May 2013.

O'Gara explained his decision to retire: "I have ambitions in the years ahead to coach at a high level and, with this in mind, I can confirm now that I will be joining Racing Métro's coaching staff in July. I am trusting my instinct and it is telling me now is the appropriate time to stop (playing). Had I already decided to retire before the (Heineken Cup semi-final) loss in Montpellier last month? I kind of knew. My lads are gone. My boys in the team are gone." Munster Rugby Chief Executive Garrett Fitzgerald also paid tribute to O'Gara: "In wishing Ronan the very best in the future, I'd like to acknowledge the immense contribution he has made to Munster Rugby and indeed rugby in general in Ireland over the course of what has been a fabulous career."

== Coaching career ==
O'Gara had been offered a one-year contract extension by Munster, but instead decided to take a coaching role with French club Racing 92. Starting in July 2013, O'Gara worked primarily as a defence coach with Racing. In 2016 he agreed a contract extension with Racing 92 until 2019. Amongst others, O'Gara coached former Ireland teammate Johnny Sexton, who expressed his delight at being able to work alongside his former Ireland rival. In June 2017, O'Gara joined the Ireland squad for their one-off test match against the United States as a skills coach.

In November 2017, Racing 92 agreed to release O'Gara early from his contract, so he could join the Crusaders coaching team in New Zealand. He began as assistant backs coach with the Crusaders on 1 January 2018, and extended his contract for the 2019 Super Rugby season in June 2018. O'Gara experienced success in his first season in Christchurch, with the Crusaders winning a 9th Super Rugby title, and they defended the title in the 2019 Super Rugby season, securing a record 10th title with a 19–3 win against Argentinian side Jaguares in O'Gara's final match as part of the Crusaders coaching staff.

=== La Rochelle ===
O'Gara joined French Top 14 club La Rochelle to replace Xavier Garbajosa as their new head coach upon the conclusion of his duties with the Crusaders 2019 Super Rugby season, in time for the 2019–20 Top 14 season. Jono Gibbes, former Leinster forwards coach and Ulster head coach, was director of rugby at the club at the time.

Following La Rochelle's 27–16 away win against Gloucester in the last 16 of the 2020–21 Challenge Cup on 2 April 2021, O'Gara was interviewed post-match by BT Sport and explained how his rugby philosophy had developed whilst coaching in France and New Zealand, describing how KBA - Keep Ball Alive - had become intrinsic to his style of play and mindset as a coach. The interview was widely shared and praised by the rugby media. La Rochelle have also been praised for their astute game management and effective defence during O'Gara's tenure at the club.

O'Gara signed a new three-year contract with La Rochelle in April 2021, effective until the end of the 2023–24 season. With the news that director of rugby Jono Gibbes had joined rival club Clermont as their new head coach, O'Gara now oversaw the full spectrum of rugby operations at La Rochelle, whilst also continuing his head coach responsibilities.

O'Gara faced an LNR disciplinary hearing in November 2021 after he failed to properly register his position on La Rochelle's teamsheet for their fixture against Toulon, which meant O'Gara was not allowed to be present pitch-side during the game, leading to a disagreement, albeit polite, between O'Gara and the fourth official.

Having lost to rivals Toulouse in the 2020–21 European Rugby Champions Cup final, O'Gara coached La Rochelle to their first major silverware when they defeated Leinster 24–21 in the 2021–22 Champions Cup final on 28 May 2022.

O'Gara was banned for six weeks for disrespecting a match official after La Rochelle's fixture against Lyon in September 2022, and he faced another LNR disciplinary hearing in November 2022 after being cited for alleged comments made towards a match official; O'Gara was subsequently banned for ten weeks and fined €20,000, €5,000 of which was suspended.

O'Gara reunited with his former Crusaders boss Scott Robertson to coach the Barbarians in their fixture against an All Blacks XV on 13 November 2022, which the Barbarians won 35–31. La Rochelle confirmed in December 2022 that O'Gara had extended his contract with the club until 2027; this followed weeks of speculation that O'Gara was being considered for the England head coach position. La Rochelle successfully defended their Champions Cup title during the 2022–23 season, coming from seventeen points down to defeat Leinster 27–26 in the Aviva Stadium, Dublin. This achievement meant La Rochelle became only the 5th team to retain the Champions Cup, after Leicester Tigers, Leinster, Toulon and Saracens.

In December 2023, he was given a one-week touchline suspension for his conduct in a defeat to Racing 92. The suspension meant he had to watch La Rochelle's Champions Cup group stage fixture against Leinster from the stands, a game they would go on to lose 16-9 at home. It was La Rochelle's first ever defeat to Leinster in a Champions Cup fixture. As of December 2023, he has received a cumulative total of 20 weeks in suspensions from the French authorities.

In November 2025, he received a red card in the Top14 against Pau, following comments which were overheard by an official. Earlier in the match, La Rochelle fly half, Antoine Hastoy, had been sent off after just 34 seconds.

In September 2026, he signed a contract extension with La Rochelle to keep him at the club until 2031.

== Honours and achievements ==
Upon his retirement from playing, O'Gara held a number of honours and achievements at both club and international level. At the time, he had played for Ireland more times than any other player in history and had won nine trophies with Munster.

In May 2016, O'Gara was inducted into the IRUPA Hall of Fame. In September 2018, O'Gara was inducted into the World Rugby Hall of Fame, becoming the 12th Irish inductee and inductee number 139 overall.

=== International career by opposition ===
Against	Played	Won	Lost	Drawn	Tries	Points	% Won
Argentina	8	6	2	0	0	59	75
Australia	9	3	5	1	1	74	33.33
Canada	2	1	0	1	0	22	50
England	14	8	6	0	1	101	57.14
France	16	3	12	1	2	127	18.75
Georgia	2	2	0	0	0	23	100
Italy	14	14	0	0	3	180	100
Japan	1	1	0	0	0	23	100
Namibia	2	2	0	0	0	21	100
New Zealand*	13	0	13	0	0	38	0
Pacific Islanders	1	1	0	0	0	0	100
Romania	3	3	0	0	0	14	100
Russia	2	2	0	0	0	30	100
Samoa	3	3	0	0	3	62	100
Scotland	15	11	4	0	2	125	73.33
South Africa*	8	2	6	0	1	56	25
Tonga	1	1	0	0	0	10	100
United States	2	2	0	0	0	18	100
Wales	14	8	6	0	3	100	57.14
Total	130	73	54	3	16	1083	56.15

Correct as of 17 March 2013 * indicates inclusion of caps for British & Irish Lions

=== Player ===
Cork Constitution

- All-Ireland League:
  - Winner (1): 1998–99
- Munster Senior League:
  - Winner (1): 1998

Munster

- European Rugby Champions Cup:
  - Winner (2): 2005–06, 2007–08
- United Rugby Championship:
  - Winner (3): 2002–03, 2008–09, 2010–11
- Celtic Cup:
  - Winner (1): 2004–05
- Irish Interprovincial Rugby Championship:
  - Winner (3): 1998–99, 1999–2000, 2000–01

Ireland

- Six Nations Championship:
  - Winner (1): 2009
- Grand Slam:
  - Winner (1): 2009
- Triple Crown:
  - Winner (4): 2004, 2006, 2007, 2009

Individual

European Player of the Year - Winner - 2010 - Best Player of last 15 Seasons

- British & Irish Lions:
  - Tourist (3): 2001, 2005, 2009

=== Coach ===
Racing 92

- Top 14:
  - Winner (1): 2015–16

Crusaders

- Super Rugby:
  - Winner (2): 2018, 2019

La Rochelle

- European Champions Cup:
  - Winner (2): 2021–22, 2022–23
  - Runner-up (1): 2020–21

== Personal life ==
On 6 July 2006, O'Gara married his longtime girlfriend Jessica Daly. They have five children – twins, a boy and a girl named Rua and Molly, born in 2008, and three more sons – JJ, born in 2010, Zak, born in 2012 and Max, born in 2014.

On 9 October 2008, he published Ronan O'Gara: My Autobiography, co-written by Denis Walsh, chief sports-writer with the Irish edition of The Sunday Times. An updated version of his autobiography was released in 2009, after Ireland's Grand Slam success. O'Gara released a second autobiography in November 2013, titled Ronan O'Gara: Unguarded. On 2 January 2014, a new behind-the-scenes documentary called "ROG – The Ronan O’Gara Documentary" aired on RTÉ One.

In December 2012, Joan Collins named O'Gara under Dáil privilege as being among those to benefit from having their penalty points cancelled by gardaí.

On 24 October 2013, a testimonial dinner to honour O'Gara was held at Cork's City Hall, with around 850 guests paying €300 per ticket to charity. On 11 May 2017, at a ceremony held in Cork City Hall, O'Gara was awarded the Freedom of Cork City.
