= 2006–07 Leinster Rugby season =

Leinster Rugby
- 2006–07 season
- Manager: (Australia) Michael Cheika
- Captain: (Ireland) Brian O'Driscoll
- Celtic League: 3rd
- Heineken Cup: Quarter-finalist
- Top try scorer: All: Shane Horgan (9)
- Top points scorer: All: Felipe Contepomi (258)
- Highest home attendance: 48,000 vs Ulster; 31 December 2006
- Lowest home attendance: 3,750 vs Glasgow Warriors; 10 November 2006
- Average home attendance: 12,808
Home colours	Away colours	Third colours

The 2006–07 Leinster Rugby season was Leinster's sixth competing in the Celtic League alongside which they competed in the 2006–07 Heineken Cup. The season ended without silverware as the team finished third in the Celtic League and were eliminated at the quarter-final stage of the Heineken Cup. The 2006–07 season was the last in which home Celtic League games were played in Donnybrook (future ties have been played at the larger RDS Arena).

== Player transfers ==
=== Players in ===
- (Australia) Michael Berne
- (Ireland) Matt D’Arcy
- (Ireland) Andrew Dunne from (England) Bath Rugby
- (Australia) Owen Finegan from (England) Newcastle Falcons
- (Ireland) Luke Fitzgerald
- (Ireland) Cian Healy
- (Ireland) Trevor Hogan from (Ireland) Munster
- (Ireland) Stephen Keogh from (Ireland) Munster
- (Ireland) Richie Leyden
- (Ireland) Ross McCarron
- (Ireland) Kevin McLaughlin
- (New Zealand) Fosi Pala'amo
- (South Africa) Harry Vermaas from (South Africa) Blue Bulls
- (Australia) Chris Whitaker from (Australia) New South Wales Waratahs
- (Ireland) Cillian Willis
- (Cook Islands) Stan Wright from (New Zealand) Blues

=== Players out ===
- (Ireland) David Blaney to (England) Bristol Bears
- (Ireland) Emmet Byrne (retired)
- (Ireland) Simon Crawford
- (Ireland) Des Dillon
- (New Zealand) Ben Gissing to (Scotland) Edinburgh
- (Ireland) Brendan Burke
- (Ireland) Stephen Grissing
- (England) Jonny Hepworth to (England) Leeds Tykes
- (Ireland) John Lyne
- (Ireland) Eric Miller (retired)
- (Ireland) Eoghan Hickey to (Ireland) Munster
- (Ireland) Brian O'Meara to (Ireland) Munster
- (Ireland) Brian O'Riordan to (England) Bristol Bears
- (New Zealand) Bryce Williams to (France) Bourgoin
- (Ireland) James Norton

== Squad ==
Leinster Rugby squad
**Props**: (Ireland) **Reggie Corrigan**; (England) **Will Green**; (Ireland) Cian Healy; (Ireland) Ronan McCormack; (New Zealand) Fosi Pala'amo; (South Africa) Harry Vermaas; (Ireland) Johnny Wickham; (Cook Islands) Stan Wright; **Hookers**: (Ireland) Brian Blaney; (Ireland) **Bernard Jackman**; **Locks**: (Australia) Adam Byrnes; (Ireland) Trevor Hogan; (New Zealand) Cameron Jowitt; (Ireland) Richie Leyden; (Ireland) **Malcolm O'Kelly**; (Ireland) Devin Toner	**Back row**: (Australia) Owen Finegan; (Ireland) **Keith Gleeson**; (Ireland) Jamie Heaslip; (Ireland) Stephen Keogh; (Ireland) Kevin McLaughlin; (Ireland) Ciarán Potts; (Ireland) Niall Ronan; **Scrum-halves**: (Ireland) Matt D’Arcy; (Ireland) **Guy Easterby**; (Australia) Chris Whitaker; (Ireland) Cillian Willis; **Fly-halves**: (Argentina) **Felipe Contepomi**; (Ireland) Andrew Dunne; (Ireland) Johnny Sexton; (Australia) Christian Warner	**Centres**: (Australia) Michael Berne; (Ireland) **Gordon D'Arcy**; (Ireland) **Shane Horgan**; (Ireland) **Kieran Lewis**; (Ireland) **Brian O'Driscoll**; **Wings**: (Ireland) Gary Brown; (Ireland) Luke Fitzgerald; (Ireland) **Denis Hickie**; **Fullbacks**: (Ireland) **Girvan Dempsey**; (Ireland) Rob Kearney; (Ireland) Ross McCarron
(c) denotes the team captain, **Bold** denotes internationally capped players.^{*} denotes players qualified to play for Ireland on residency or dual nationality.

== Match attendance ==
Leinster average Celtic League attendance was 12,796 (boosted heavily by two games held at Lansdowne Road).

Leinster's tie against Ulster Rugby set a Celtic League record with a sell out attendance of 48,000 at the last ever game at Lansdowne Road.

== Celtic League ==
=== Table ===
Pos	Team	Pld	W	D	L	PF	PA	PD	TF	TA	TBP	LBP	Pts
1	(Wales) Ospreys	20	14	0	6	461	374	+87	49	32	4	4	64
2	(Wales) Cardiff Blues	20	13	1	6	447	327	+120	53	33	6	3	63
3	(Ireland) Leinster	20	12	1	7	472	376	+96	54	37	7	4	61
4	(Wales) Llanelli Scarlets	20	12	0	8	490	417	+73	61	41	9	0	57
5	(Ireland) Ulster	20	11	1	8	423	310	+113	45	31	4	5	55
6	(Ireland) Munster	20	12	0	8	379	294	+85	37	31	3	3	54
7	(Scotland) Glasgow Warriors	20	11	0	9	434	419	+15	42	49	3	2	49
8	(Scotland) Edinburgh	20	8	1	11	335	423	−88	31	45	2	6	42
9	(Wales) Newport Gwent Dragons	20	8	0	12	353	362	−9	36	43	1	6	39
10	(Ireland) Connacht	20	4	2	14	326	474	−148	30	48	2	4	26
11	(Scotland) Border Reivers	20	2	0	18	201	545	−344	16	64	0	4	12
Under the standard bonus point system, points are awarded as follows: 4 points for a win; 2 points for a draw; 1 bonus point for scoring 4 tries (or more) (Try bonus); 1 bonus point for losing by 7 points (or fewer) (Losing bonus)
Source: RaboDirect PRO12

=== Results ===
8 September 2006	Edinburgh (Scotland)	20 – 14	(Ireland) Leinster	Murrayfield
19:30		Report		Attendance: 2,479

16 September 2006	Leinster (Ireland)	16 – 9	(Wales) Cardiff Blues	Donnybrook
19:30		Report		Attendance: 5,200

23 September 2006	Llanelli Scarlets (Wales)	33 – 21	(Ireland) Leinster	Stradey Park
17:30		Report		Attendance: 6,721

29 September 2006	Connacht (Ireland)	16 – 31	(Ireland) Leinster	Sportsground
18:30		Report		Attendance: 3,678

6 October 2006	Leinster (Ireland)	27 – 20	(Ireland) Munster	Lansdowne Road
19:30		Report		Attendance: 27,252

13 October 2006	Border Reivers (Scotland)	22 – 19	(Ireland) Leinster	Netherdale
19:30		Report		Attendance: 1,661

4 November 2006	Leinster (Ireland)	35 – 13	(Wales) Newport Gwent Dragons	Donnybrook
19:30		Report		Attendance: 4,790

10 November 2006	Leinster (Ireland)	38 – 23	(Scotland) Glasgow Warriors	Donnybrook
19:30		Report		Attendance: 3,750

2 December 2006	Ulster (Ireland)	6 – 6	(Ireland) Leinster	Ravenhill
19:30		Report		Attendance: 12,800

27 December 2006	Munster (Ireland)	25 – 11	(Ireland) Leinster	Thomond Park
15:00		Report		Attendance: 13,200

31 December 2006	Leinster (Ireland)	20 – 12	(Ireland) Ulster	Lansdowne Road
14:00		Report		Attendance: 48,000

6 January 2007	Leinster (Ireland)	45 – 22	(Wales) Ospreys	Donnybrook
19:30		Report		Attendance: 6,000

26 January 2007	Leinster (Ireland)	44 – 34	(Wales) Llanelli Scarlets	Donnybrook
19:40		Report		Attendance: 5,890

16 February 2007	Leinster (Ireland)	13 – 6	(Scotland) Edinburgh	Donnybrook
19:30		Report		Attendance: 5,340

24 March 2007	Leinster (Ireland)	30 – 21	(Ireland) Connacht	Donnybrook
17:15		Report		Attendance: 6,500

6 April 2007	Glasgow Warriors (Scotland)	26 – 20	(Ireland) Leinster	Hughenden
19:30		Report		Attendance: 2,121

13 April 2007	Newport Gwent Dragons (Wales)	22 – 23	(Ireland) Leinster	Rodney Parade
19:10		Report		Attendance: 5,442

27 April 2007	Ospreys (Wales)	19 – 17	(Ireland) Leinster	Liberty Stadium
19:10		Report		Attendance: 10,702

5 May 2007	Leinster (Ireland)	31 – 0	(Scotland) Border Reivers	Donnybrook
19:30		Report		Attendance: 6,200

11 May 2007	Cardiff Blues (Wales)	27 – 11	(Ireland) Leinster	Cardiff Arms Park
19:10		Report		Attendance: 10,320

== Heineken Cup ==
=== Pool 2 ===
Team	P	W	D	L	Tries for	Tries against	Try diff	Points for	Points against	Points diff	TB	LB	Pts
(Ireland) Leinster (6)	6	4	0	2	21	10	11	174	97	77	3	2	21
(France) Agen	6	4	0	2	12	14	−2	119	119	0	1	0	17
(England) Gloucester	6	3	0	3	19	16	3	152	144	8	2	1	15
(Scotland) Edinburgh	6	1	0	5	10	22	−12	95	180	−85	0	1	5

21 October 2006	Leinster (Ireland)	37–20	(England) Gloucester	Lansdowne Road, Dublin
17:30	Try: D'Arcy 2' c Contepomi 13' c Keogh 36' c Horgan 61' c Con: Felipe Contepomi (4); Pen: Felipe Contepomi (3) 22', 26', 33'	Report	Try: Foster 8' c Adams 40+2' c Con: Lamb (2); Pen: Lamb (2) 6', 50'	Attendance: 22,530; Referee: Christophe Berdos (France)

29 October 2006	Edinburgh (Scotland)	25–24	(Ireland) Leinster	Murrayfield, Edinburgh
13:00	Try: Dewey 68' c Con: Paterson; Pen: Paterson (5) 2', 16', 26', 40+5', 78'; Drop: Hodge 80+3'	Report	Try: Dempsey (2) 12' c, 79' c Fitzgerald 47' c Con: Contepomi (3); Pen: Contepomi 4'	Attendance: 5,867; Referee: Joël Jutge (France)

9 December 2006	Leinster (Ireland)	26–10	(France) Agen	Lansdowne Road, Dublin
17:35	Try: Whitaker 2' m O'Driscoll (3) 12' m, 66' m, 80+5' m Pen: D'Arcy (2) 50', 63'	Report	Try: Caucaunibuca 69' c Con: Miquel; Pen: Miquel 40+2'	Attendance: 18,652; Referee: Wayne Barnes (England)

16 December 2006	Agen (France)	13–25	(Ireland) Leinster	Stade Armandie, Agen
16:30	Try: Caucaunibuca 34' c Con: Miquel; Pen: Miquel (2) 11', 45'	Report	Try: Heaslip 30' m Hickie 63' c McCormack 80+6'; Con: Dempsey; Dunne; Pen: D'Arcy 15'; Drop: Dunne 80+2'	Attendance: 9,000; Referee: Tony Spreadbury (England)

13 January 2007	Leinster (Ireland)	49–10	(Scotland) Edinburgh	Donnybrook, Dublin
17:35	Try: Kearney 3' c Contepomi 20' c Horgan (3) 44' c, 65' c, 71' c Keogh 63' m Con: Contepomi (5); Pen: Contepomi (3) 32', 35', 56'	Report	Try: Southwell 24' m Cairns 42' m	Attendance: 6,400; Referee: Dave Pearson (England)

19 January 2007	Gloucester (England)	19–13	(Ireland) Leinster	Kingsholm, Gloucester
19:30	Try: Penalty try 19' c Califano 65' m Foster 74' c Con: Walker; Lamb	Report	Try: O'Driscoll 33' c Con: Contepomi; Pen: Contepomi (2) 57', 80+11'	Attendance: 12,500; Referee: Nigel Owens (Wales)

=== Quarter-final ===
31 March 2007	London Wasps (England)	35–13	(Ireland) Leinster	Adams Park, High Wycombe
17:45	Tries: Reddan (2) 33' c, 66' c Haskell 42' c Cipriani 50' m Con: King (3); Pen: King (3) 3', 12', 63'	Report	Try: Whitaker 20' c Con: Contepomi; Pen: Contepomi (2) 40', 60'	Attendance: 10,000; Referee: Nigel Owens (Wales)

== End-of-season awards ==
The Leinster Rugby Awards lunch was held in Dublin on 17 May 2007. Winners were:

- Player of the year: Gordon D'Arcy
- Hall of Fame: Philip Orr
- Newcomer of the year: Luke Fitzgerald
- Special merit award: Reggie Corrigan
- Leinster League player of the year: Felix Jones
- Ladies' player of the year: Sinead Ryan, Navan R.F.C.
- School of the year: St Michael's College, Dublin
