= 2005–06 Leinster Rugby season =

- Ground(s): Donnybrook, Dublin; Lansdowne Road, Dublin
- Coach: Michael Cheika
- League(s): Celtic League (2nd); Heineken Cup (semi-final)

2005-06 was Leinster's eleventh season under professionalism, and their first season under head coach Michael Cheika.

Felipe Contepomi was player of the season. In the 2006 IRUPA awards, Shane Horgan won the try of the season award.

== Player transfers ==
=== Players in ===
- (Australia) Adam Byrnes from (Australia) Eastern Suburbs
- (England) Will Green from (England) Wasps
- (Ireland) Stephen Grissing
- (England) Jonny Hepworth from (England) Castleford Tigers
- (Ireland) Eoghan Hickey
- (Ireland) Bernard Jackman from (Ireland) Connacht
- (New Zealand) Cameron Jowitt
- (Ireland) Rob Kearney
- (Ireland) Ronan McCormack from (Ireland) Ulster
- (Ireland) Johnny Sexton
- (Ireland) Devin Toner
- (New Zealand) Bryce Williams from (New Zealand) Auckland

=== Players out ===
- (Ireland) Peter Coyle
- (England) Ricky Nebbett to (England) Harlequins
- (Ireland) Anto O’Donnell
- (Ireland) Niall Treston
- (Ireland) Shane Byrne to (England) Saracens
- (Ireland) Gavin Hickie to (England) London Irish
- (Ireland) Leo Cullen to (England) Leicester Tigers
- (Ireland) Dave Gannon to (Ireland) Connacht
- (Ireland) Victor Costello (retired)
- (Ireland) Shane Jennings to (England) Leicester Tigers
- (Ireland) David McAllister
- (Ireland) Aidan McCullen to (France) Toulouse
- (Ireland) Dave Hewitt to (France) Racing 92
- (New Zealand) David Holwell to (New Zealand) Hurricanes
- (Ireland) John Hearty to (Ireland) Connacht
- (Ireland) David Quinlan to (England) Northampton Saints
- (Ireland) John McWeeney (retired)

== Squad ==
Leinster Rugby squad
**Props**: (Ireland) **Emmet Byrne**; (Ireland) **Reggie Corrigan**; (England) **Will Green**; (Ireland) John Lyne; (Ireland) Ronan McCormack; **Hookers**: (Ireland) Brian Blaney; (Ireland) David Blaney; (Ireland) **Bernard Jackman**; **Locks**: (Australia) Adam Byrnes; (New Zealand) Ben Gissing; (New Zealand) Cameron Jowitt; (Ireland) **Malcolm O'Kelly**; (Ireland) Devin Toner; (New Zealand) Bryce Williams	**Back row**: (Ireland) Simon Crawford; (Ireland) Des Dillon; (Ireland) **Keith Gleeson**; (Ireland) Jamie Heaslip; (Ireland) **Eric Miller**; (Ireland) Ciarán Potts; (Ireland) Niall Ronan; **Scrum-halves**: (Ireland) **Guy Easterby**; (Ireland) **Brian O'Meara**; (Ireland) Brian O'Riordan; **Fly-halves**: (Argentina) **Felipe Contepomi**; (Ireland) Eoghan Hickey; (Ireland) Johnny Sexton; (Australia) Christian Warner	**Centres**: (Ireland) Brendan Burke; (Ireland) Stephen Grissing; (England) Jonny Hepworth; (Ireland) **Shane Horgan**; (Ireland) **Kieran Lewis**; (Ireland) **Brian O'Driscoll**; **Wings**: (Ireland) Gary Brown; (Ireland) **Gordon D'Arcy**; (Ireland) **Denis Hickie** (c); (Ireland) James Norton; **Fullbacks**: (Ireland) **Girvan Dempsey**; (Ireland) Rob Kearney
(c) denotes the team captain, **Bold** denotes internationally capped players.^{*} denotes players qualified to play for Ireland on residency or dual nationality.

== Celtic League ==
=== Table ===
Pos	Team	Pld	W	D	L	PF	PA	PD	TF	TA	TBP	LBP	Pts
1	(Ireland) Ulster	20	15	1	4	510	347	+163	49	31	3	2	75
2	(Ireland) Leinster	20	14	0	6	545	427	+118	59	45	8	2	74
3	(Ireland) Munster	20	12	0	8	439	372	+67	49	42	7	3	66
4	(Wales) Cardiff Blues	20	11	0	9	475	389	+86	51	38	6	5	63
5	(Scotland) Edinburgh Gunners	20	11	0	9	418	415	+3	48	45	5	3	60
6	(Wales) Llanelli Scarlets	20	10	1	9	418	402	+16	49	37	3	4	57
7	(Wales) Ospreys	20	11	0	9	381	409	−28	33	38	1	2	55
8	(Wales) Newport Gwent Dragons	20	7	0	13	355	456	−101	40	51	2	7	45
9	(Scotland) Border Reivers	20	7	0	13	386	501	−115	39	59	1	7	44
10	(Ireland) Connacht	20	6	0	14	325	466	−141	28	51	1	4	37
11	(Scotland) Glasgow Warriors	20	5	0	15	371	439	−68	39	47	2	7	37
Under the standard bonus point system, points are awarded as follows: 4 points for a win; 2 points for a draw; 1 bonus point for scoring 4 tries (or more) (Try bonus); 1 bonus point for losing by 7 points (or fewer) (Losing bonus)
Due to the uneven number of participating teams, each team had two free weekends and were awarded 4 match points each time.
Source: RaboDirect PRO12

4 September 2005	Ospreys (Wales)	22–20	(Ireland) Leinster	Liberty Stadium
17:10		Report		Attendance: 10,131

10 September 2005	Leinster (Ireland)	26–21	(Scotland) Glasgow Warriors	Donnybrook
17:00		Report		Attendance: 3,700

16 September 2005	Leinster (Ireland)	33–14	(Wales) Newport Gwent Dragons	Donnybrook
19:10		Report		Attendance: 3,700

1 October 2005	Leinster (Ireland)	30–23	(Ireland) Ulster	Donnybrook
17:30	Try: Hickie; Potts; Con: Contemomi; Pen: Contemomi (6)	Report	Try: Wallace; Best; Con: David Humphreys (2); Pen: David Humphreys (3)	Attendance: 6,500; Referee: Olan Trevor

9 October 2005	Munster (Ireland)	33–9	(Ireland) Leinster	Musgrave Park
15:00		Report		Attendance: 7,500

15 October 2005	Leinster (Ireland)	34–15	(Wales) Cardiff Blues	RDS Arena
17:30		Report		Attendance: 7,000

6 November 2005	Leinster (Ireland)	13–27	(Scotland) Edinburgh Gunners	Donnybrook
15:00		Report		Attendance: 1,700

3 December 2005	Connacht (Ireland)	9–21	(Ireland) Leinster	Sportsground
14:00		Report		Attendance: 2,250

26 December 2005	Ulster (Ireland)	19–24	(Ireland) Leinster	Ravenhill
17:00	Try: Bowe; Con: Humphreys; Pen: Humphreys (4)	Report	Try: D'Arcy; Dempsey; Con: Contepomi; Pen: Contepomi (4)	Attendance: 12,300; Referee: George Clancy

31 December 2005	Leinster (Ireland)	35–23	(Ireland) Munster	RDS Arena
13:00		Report		Attendance: 14,135

7 January 2006	Llanelli Scarlets (Wales)	20–18	(Ireland) Leinster	Stradey Park
17:30		Report		Attendance: 6,126

27 January 2006	Leinster (Ireland)	62–14	(Scotland) Border Reivers	Donnybrook
19:30		Report		Attendance: 4,125

18 February 2006	Newport Gwent Dragons (Wales)	31–18	(Ireland) Leinster	Rodney Parade
17:30		Report		Attendance: 5,117

5 March 2006	Leinster (Ireland)	16–13	(Ireland) Connacht	Donnybrook
17:15		Report		Attendance: 3,573

7 April 2006	Border Reivers (Scotland)	34–35	(Ireland) Leinster	Netherdale
21:00		Report		Attendance: 1,307

14 April 2006	Leinster (Ireland)	30–22	(Wales) Llanelli Scarlets	Lansdowne Road
19:10		Report		Attendance: 7,250

29 April 2006	Leinster (Ireland)	38–21	(Wales) Ospreys	Lansdowne Road
19:35		Report		Attendance: 6,455

7 May 2006	Glasgow Warriors (Scotland)	18–21	(Ireland) Leinster	Firhill
19:30		Report		Attendance: 1,129

14 May 2006	Cardiff Blues (Wales)	40–31	(Ireland) Leinster	Millennium Stadium
18:10		Report		Attendance: 15,327

26 May 2006	Edinburgh Gunners (Scotland)	8–31	(Ireland) Leinster	Murrayfield
19:10		Report		Attendance: 2,364

== Heineken Cup ==
=== Pool 5 ===
Team	P	W	D	L	Tries for	Tries against	Try diff	Points for	Points against	Points diff	TB	LB	Pts
(England) Bath (6)	6	5	0	1	18	9	+9	166	111	+55	3	0	23
(Ireland) Leinster (8)	6	4	0	2	28	13	+15	214	124	+90	4	2	22
(France) Bourgoin	6	2	0	4	9	24	−15	109	195	−86	1	0	9
(Scotland) Glasgow	6	1	0	5	16	25	−9	131	190	−59	1	1	6

22 October 2005	Leinster (Ireland)	19–22	(England) Bath	RDS Arena
17:15				Attendance: 13,152

30 October 2005	Glasgow (Scotland)	20–33	(Ireland) Leinster	Hughenden
15:00				Attendance: 1,907

10 December 2005	Leinster (Ireland)	53–7	(France) Bourgoin	RDS Arena
17:15				Attendance: 11,133

17 December 2005	Bourgoin (France)	30–28	(Ireland) Leinster	Stade Pierre Rajon
16:00				Attendance: 6,800

14 January 2006	Leinster (Ireland)	46–22	(Scotland) Glasgow	RDS Arena
17:15				Attendance: 12,443

22 January 2006	Bath (England)	23–35	(Ireland) Leinster	Recreation Ground
15:00				Attendance: 10,600

== Quarter-final ==
1 April 2006	Toulouse (France)	35–41	(Ireland) Leinster	Stade de Toulouse, Toulouse
16:00	Try: Nyanga 73' c Jauzion 80' c Con: Élissalde (2); Pen: Élissalde (6) 6', 12', 32', 42', 48', 57'; Drop: Michalak 50'	Report	Try: O'Driscoll 24' c Jowitt 53' c Hickie 59' m Horgan 63' c Con: Contepomi (3); Pen: Contepomi (5) 9', 16', 18', 34', 67'	Attendance: 37,815; Referee: Dave Pearson (England)

== Semi-final ==
23 April 2006	Leinster (Ireland)	6–30	(Ireland) Munster	Lansdowne Road, Dublin
15:00	Pen: Contepomi (2) 22', 71'	Report	Try: Leamy 10' c O'Gara 74' c Halstead 80' c Con: O'Gara (3); Pen: O'Gara (3) 2', 24', 32'	Attendance: 47,800; Referee: Joël Jutge (France)

== End-of-season awards ==
Winners of the 2006 Leinster Rugby Awards were:

- Player of the year: Felipe Contepomi
- Young player of the year: Rob Kearney
- Women's player of the year: Tanya Rosser
- Club player of the year: Doonachadh Casey, Monkstown RFC
- Hall of Fame: Ken Ging
