= 2004–05 Leinster Rugby season =

- Ground(s): Donnybrook, Dublin; Lansdowne Road, Dublin
- Coach(es): Declan Kidney; Gerry Murphy (interim)
- League(s): Celtic League (3rd); Heineken Cup (quarter-final)

2004-05 was Leinster's tenth season under professionalism, and their only season under head coach Declan Kidney. Gerry Murphy was interim head coach for the last few games of the season.

Before the start of the 2004–05 season, the 'Lions' was dropped from the name.

Leinster improved during the 2004–05 season, finishing 3rd, just three points behind the eventual winners, the Ospreys. Leinster also won all of their pool games in that year's European Cup, and were again among the favourites for the title, however they went out at the quarter final stage to Leicester Tigers.

In the 2005 IRUPA awards, Shane Jennings won the unsung hero award, and David Holwell won the newcomer of the year award. Holwell was the Leinster player of the year.

== Player transfers ==
=== Players in ===
- (England) Guy Easterby from (England) Rotherham Titans
- (Ireland) Dave Gannon
- (Ireland) Jamie Heaslip
- (Ireland) Dave Hewitt from (Ireland) Connacht
- (New Zealand) David Holwell from (New Zealand) Hurricanes
- (Ireland) David McAllister
- (England) Ricky Nebbett from (England) Leicester Tigers
- (Ireland) Anton O’Donnell

=== Players out ===
- (Ireland) Enda Bohan
- (Ireland) Sean Brophy
- (Ireland) Rob Connolly
- (Ireland) Niall Breslin (retired)
- (Ireland) James Downey to (Ireland) Connacht
- (England) Jason Moran
- (Ireland) Shane Whelan
- (England) Matt Leek
- (Ireland) Niall O’Brien
- (Ireland) Daragh O’Shea

== Squad ==
Leinster Rugby squad
**Props**: (Ireland) **Emmet Byrne**; (Ireland) **Reggie Corrigan**; (Ireland) Peter Coyle; (Ireland) John Lyne; (England) Ricky Nebbett; (Ireland) Anto O’Donnell; (Ireland) Niall Treston; **Hookers**: (Ireland) Brian Blaney; (Ireland) David Blaney; (Ireland) **Shane Byrne**; (Ireland) Gavin Hickie; **Locks**: (Ireland) **Leo Cullen**; (Ireland) Dave Gannon; (New Zealand) Ben Gissing; (Ireland) **Malcolm O'Kelly**	**Back row**: (Ireland) **Victor Costello**; (Ireland) Simon Crawford; (Ireland) Des Dillon; (Ireland) **Keith Gleeson**; (Ireland) Jamie Heaslip; (Ireland) Shane Jennings; (Ireland) **Aidan McCullen**; (Ireland) **Eric Miller**; (Ireland) Ciarán Potts; (Ireland) Niall Ronan; **Scrum-halves**: (England) Guy Easterby *; (Ireland) **Brian O'Meara**; (Ireland) Brian O'Riordan; **Fly-halves**: (Argentina) **Felipe Contepomi**; (Ireland) Dave Hewitt; (New Zealand) David Holwell; (Ireland) David McAllister; (Australia) Christian Warner	**Centres**: (Ireland) Brendan Burke; (Ireland) John Hearty; (Ireland) **Shane Horgan**; (Ireland) Kieran Lewis; (Ireland) **Brian O'Driscoll**; (Ireland) David Quinlan; **Wings**: (Ireland) Gary Brown; (Ireland) **Gordon D'Arcy**; (Ireland) **Denis Hickie** (c); (Ireland) **John McWeeney**; (Ireland) James Norton; **Fullbacks**: (Ireland) **Girvan Dempsey**
(c) denotes the team captain, **Bold** denotes internationally capped players.^{*} denotes players qualified to play for Ireland on residency or dual nationality.

== Celtic League ==
=== Table ===
Pos.	Team	Pld	W	D	L	PF	PA	PD	TF	TA	TBP	LBP	Pts
1	(Wales) Neath-Swansea Ospreys	20	16	1	3	508	267	+241	53	27	7	3	76
2	(Ireland) Munster	20	15	1	4	470	331	+139	54	33	6	1	69
3	(Ireland) Leinster	20	12	1	7	455	350	+105	46	32	4	3	57
4	(Wales) Newport Gwent Dragons	20	11	0	9	381	436	−55	39	43	4	2	50
5	(Wales) Llanelli Scarlets	20	9	0	11	402	446	−44	48	42	7	3	46
6	(Scotland) Glasgow Warriors	20	8	1	11	465	466	−1	40	58	4	7	45
7	(Scotland) Edinburgh	20	9	0	11	409	407	+2	47	40	4	4	44
8	(Ireland) Ulster	20	9	0	11	363	387	−24	37	34	2	5	43
9	(Wales) Cardiff Blues	20	8	1	11	350	404	−54	35	41	2	4	40
10	(Ireland) Connacht	20	7	1	12	317	407	−90	32	46	2	5	37
11	(Scotland) Borders	20	3	0	17	337	556	−219	31	66	2	4	18
Under the standard bonus point system, points are awarded as follows: 4 points for a win; 2 points for a draw; 1 bonus point for scoring 4 tries (or more) (Try bonus); 1 bonus point for losing by 7 points (or fewer) (Losing bonus)
Source: RaboDirect PRO12

=== Fixtures ===
5 September 2004	Leinster (Ireland)	9–9	(Wales) Cardiff Blues	Donnybrook
17:15		Report		Attendance: 3,256

11 September 2004	Ulster (Ireland)	15–26	(Ireland) Leinster	Ravenhill
17:15		Report		Attendance: 6,100

18 September 2004	Leinster (Ireland)	17–15	(Ireland) Munster	Donnybrook
17:15		Report		Attendance: 6,500

24 September 2004	Leinster (Ireland)	50–13	(Scotland) Borders	Donnybrook
19:30		Report		Attendance: 2,800

1 October 2004	Newport Gwent Dragons (Wales)	34–13	(Ireland) Leinster	Rodney Parade
19:05		Report		Attendance: 5,262

10 October 2004	Leinster (Ireland)	35–13	(Scotland) Edinburgh	Donnybrook
17:15		Report		Attendance: 4,520

15 October 2004	Neath-Swansea Ospreys (Wales)	11–3	(Ireland) Leinster	St Helen's
19:05		Report		Attendance: 4,829

5 November 2004	Leinster (Ireland)	18–9	(Ireland) Connacht	Donnybrook
19:30		Report		Attendance: 5,200

14 November 2004	Llanelli Scarlets (Wales)	24–22	(Ireland) Leinster	Racecourse Ground
17:30		Report		Attendance: 4,200

26 November 2004	Leinster (Ireland)	22–16	(Scotland) Glasgow Warriors	Donnybrook
19:30		Report		Attendance: 4,370

18 December 2004	Cardiff Blues (Wales)	6–15	(Ireland) Leinster	Cardiff Arms Park
17:30		Report		Attendance: 3,300

27 December 2004	Leinster (Ireland)	9–8	(Ireland) Ulster	Donnybrook
17:05		Report		Attendance: 5,500

1 January 2005	Munster (Ireland)	19–13	(Ireland) Leinster	Musgrave Park
17:30		Report		Attendance: 8,000

22 January 2005	Borders (Scotland)	29–16	(Ireland) Leinster	Netherdale
19:30		Report		Attendance: 1,150

30 January 2005	Leinster (Ireland)	55–3	(Wales) Newport Gwent Dragons	Lansdowne Road
16:45		Report		Attendance: 4,600

19 February 2005	Edinburgh (Scotland)	41–33	(Ireland) Leinster	Murrayfield
19:45		Report		Attendance: 2,400

6 March 2005	Leinster (Ireland)	12–16	(Wales) Neath-Swansea Ospreys	Donnybrook
16:45		Report		Attendance: 3,500

20 March 2005	Connacht (Ireland)	21–26	(Ireland) Leinster	Sportsground
14:30		Report		Attendance: 1,100

25 March 2005	Leinster (Ireland)	31–25	(Wales) Llanelli Scarlets	Lansdowne Road
17:00		Report		Attendance: 3,600

16 April 2005	Glasgow Warriors (Scotland)	23–30	(Ireland) Leinster	Hughenden
19:30		Report		Attendance: 4,364

== Heineken Cup ==
=== Pool 2 ===
Team	P	W	D	L	Tries for	Tries against	Try diff	Points for	Points against	Points diff	TB	LB	Pts
(Ireland) Leinster (1)	6	6	0	0	33	10	23	257	100	157	2	0	26
(England) Bath	6	3	0	3	15	11	4	149	122	27	1	2	15
(Italy) Benetton Treviso	6	3	0	3	14	21	−7	136	181	−45	2	0	14
(France) Bourgoin	6	0	0	6	9	29	−20	98	237	−139	0	2	2

23 October 2004; 14:30	Benetton Treviso (Italy)	9–25	(Ireland) Leinster	Stadio Comunale di Monigo
				Attendance: 4,500

30 October 2004; 17:15	Leinster (Ireland)	30–11	(England) Bath	Lansdowne Road
				Attendance: 13,850

4 December 2004; 17:15	Leinster (Ireland)	92–17	(France) Bourgoin	Lansdowne Road
				Attendance: 9,100

10 December 2004; 20:30	Bourgoin (France)	23–26	(Ireland) Leinster	Stade Pierre Rajon
				Attendance: 2,500

8 January 2005; 13:00	Bath (England)	23–27	(Ireland) Leinster	The Recreation Ground
				Attendance: 10,500

15 January 2005; 17:15	Leinster (Ireland)	57–17	(Italy) Benetton Treviso	Lansdowne Road
				Attendance: 12,750

=== Quarter-final ===
2 April 2005	Leinster (Ireland)	13–29	(England) Leicester Tigers	Lansdowne Road, Dublin
17:15 IST	Try: Horgan 73' c Con: Holwell (1); Pen: Holwell (2) 17', 55'	Report	Try: Smith 32' c Gibson 56' c Con: Goode (2/2); Pen: Goode (4) 11', 30', 40', 64'; Drop: Goode (1) 67'	Attendance: 48,500; Referee: Joël Jutge (France)

== End-of-season awards ==
Winners of the 2005 Leinster Rugby Awards were:

- Player of the year: David Holwell
- Young player of the year: Jamie Heaslip
- Special merit award: Victor Costello
- Senior club player of the year: Rob Connolly, Greystones RFC
- Leinster League player of the year: Joey Moran, Naas RFC
- School of the year: Belvedere College
- Women's player of the year: Orla Brennan, Navan R.F.C.
- Volunteer of the year: Harry Brooks, Clontarf RFC
