= 2003–04 Leinster Rugby season =

- Ground(s): Donnybrook, Dublin
- Coach: Gary Ella
- League(s): Celtic League (8th); Heineken Cup (2nd in pool)

2003-04 was Leinster ninth season under professionalism, and their only season under head coach Gary Ella, former head coach of the New South Wales Waratahs, appointed to replace Matt Williams, who had been appointed head coach of Scotland. Willie Anderson remained as assistant coach.

Gordon D'Arcy won the 2004 IRUPA players' player of the year and people's player of the year awards. Girvan Dempsey won the try of the year award.

== Player transfers ==
=== Players in ===
- (Ireland) Brian Blaney
- (Ireland) Enda Bohan
- (Ireland) Sean Brophy
- (Ireland) Gary Brown
- (Ireland) Brendan Burke
- (Ireland) Rob Connolly
- (Argentina) Felipe Contepomi from (England) Bristol
- (Ireland) Simon Crawford
- (Ireland) James Downey
- (Ireland) John Hearty
- (England) Jason Moran
- (Ireland) James Norton
- (Ireland) Niall O’Brien
- (Ireland) Daragh O’Shea
- (Ireland) Ciarán Potts
- (Ireland) Niall Ronan
- (Ireland) Shane Whelan

=== Players out ===
- (Ireland) Andy Dunne to (England) Harlequins
- (Ireland) Aidan Kearney
- (Ireland) Simon Keogh to (England) Harlequins
- (Australia) Adam Magro (released)
- (Ireland) Peter McKenna (retired)
- (Ireland) Peter Smyth
- (Ireland) Paul Wallace (retired)
- (New Zealand) Nathan Spooner to (South Africa) Natal Sharks
- (Ireland) Liam Toland
- (New Zealand) Ben Willis to (England) Harlequins

== Squad ==
Leinster Rugby squad
| **Props**: (Ireland) Enda Bohan; (Ireland) Sean Brophy; (Ireland) **Emmet Byrne**; (Ireland) **Reggie Corrigan**; (Ireland) Peter Coyle; (Ireland) John Lyne; (England) Jason Moran; (Ireland) Niall Treston; **Hookers**: (Ireland) Brian Blaney; (Ireland) David Blaney; (Ireland) **Shane Byrne**; (Ireland) Gavin Hickie; **Locks**: (Ireland) Niall Breslin; (Ireland) **Leo Cullen**; (New Zealand) Ben Gissing; (Ireland) **Malcolm O'Kelly** | **Back row**: (Ireland) Rob Connolly; (Ireland) **Victor Costello**; (Ireland) Simon Crawford; (Ireland) Des Dillon; (Ireland) **Keith Gleeson**; (Ireland) Shane Jennings; (Ireland) **Aidan McCullen**; (Ireland) **Eric Miller**; (Ireland) Ciarán Potts; (Ireland) Niall Ronan; **Scrum-halves**: (Ireland) **Brian O'Meara**; (Ireland) Brian O'Riordan; (Ireland) Shane Whelan; **Fly-halves**: (Argentina) **Felipe Contepomi**; (England) Matt Leek; (Australia) Christian Warner | **Centres**: (Ireland) Brendan Burke; (Ireland) James Downey; (Ireland) John Hearty; (Ireland) **Shane Horgan**; (Ireland) Kieran Lewis; (Ireland) **Brian O'Driscoll**; (Ireland) David Quinlan; **Wings**: (Ireland) Gary Brown; (Ireland) **Gordon D'Arcy**; (Ireland) **Denis Hickie** (c); (Ireland) **John McWeeney**; (Ireland) James Norton; (Ireland) Niall O’Brien; **Fullbacks**: (Ireland) **Girvan Dempsey**; (Ireland) Daragh O’Shea |
(c) denotes the team captain, **Bold** denotes internationally capped players.^{*} denotes players qualified to play for Ireland on residency or dual nationality.

== Celtic League ==
=== Table ===
| Pos | Team | Pld | W | D | L | PF | PA | PD | TF | TA | TBP | LBP | Pts |
|---|---|---|---|---|---|---|---|---|---|---|---|---|---|
| 1 | (Wales) Llanelli Scarlets | 22 | 16 | 1 | 5 | 597 | 385 | +212 | 57 | 39 | 7 | 3 | 76 |
| 2 | (Ireland) Ulster | 22 | 15 | 0 | 7 | 617 | 363 | +254 | 67 | 29 | 8 | 4 | 72 |
| 3 | (Wales) Newport Gwent Dragons | 22 | 16 | 0 | 6 | 590 | 449 | +141 | 59 | 41 | 7 | 1 | 72 |
| 4 | (Wales) Celtic Warriors | 22 | 14 | 0 | 8 | 560 | 451 | +109 | 48 | 37 | 5 | 4 | 65 |
| 5 | (Wales) Neath–Swansea Ospreys | 22 | 11 | 1 | 10 | 582 | 512 | +70 | 55 | 60 | 5 | 4 | 55 |
| 6 | (Wales) Cardiff Blues | 22 | 11 | 0 | 11 | 570 | 467 | +103 | 73 | 54 | 7 | 3 | 54 |
| 7 | (Ireland) Munster | 22 | 10 | 0 | 12 | 422 | 456 | −34 | 45 | 49 | 6 | 5 | 51 |
| 8 | (Ireland) Leinster | 22 | 9 | 1 | 12 | 523 | 580 | −57 | 51 | 65 | 4 | 5 | 47 |
| 9 | (Ireland) Connacht | 22 | 8 | 2 | 12 | 479 | 550 | −71 | 50 | 59 | 5 | 3 | 44 |
| 10 | (Scotland) Edinburgh | 22 | 9 | 0 | 13 | 454 | 622 | −168 | 52 | 69 | 6 | 2 | 44 |
| 11 | (Scotland) Glasgow | 22 | 6 | 1 | 15 | 442 | 614 | −172 | 52 | 61 | 3 | 3 | 32 |
| 12 | (Scotland) Borders | 22 | 4 | 0 | 18 | 363 | 750 | −387 | 42 | 88 | 1 | 5 | 22 |
Under the standard bonus point system, points are awarded as follows: 4 points for a win; 2 points for a draw; 1 bonus point for scoring 4 tries (or more) (Try bonus); 1 bonus point for losing by 7 points (or fewer) (Losing bonus)
Source: RaboDirect PRO12

=== Fixtures ===
| 5 September 2003 | Leinster (Ireland) | 8–15 | (Ireland) Munster | Donnybrook |
| 19:35 | | Report | | Attendance: 6,000 |

| 13 September 2003 | Celtic Warriors (Wales) | 29–22 | (Ireland) Leinster | Sardis Road |
| 14:30 | | Report | | Attendance: 4,500 |

| 26 September 2003 | Leinster (Ireland) | 30–33 | (Scotland) Edinburgh | Donnybrook |
| 19:30 | | Report | | Attendance: 2,600 |

| 10 October 2003 | Cardiff Blues (Wales) | 22–3 | (Ireland) Leinster | Cardiff Arms Park |
| 19:05 | | Report | | Attendance: 3,500 |

| 17 October 2003 | Leinster (Ireland) | 21–6 | (Ireland) Connacht | Donnybrook |
| 19:35 | | Report | | Attendance: 2,100 |

| 24 October 2003 | Borders (Scotland) | 21–26 | (Ireland) Leinster | Netherdale |
| 19:30 | | Report | | Attendance: 2,000 |

| 31 October 2003 | Glasgow (Scotland) | 10–31 | (Ireland) Leinster | Hughenden |
| 19:30 | | Report | | Attendance: 2,734 |

| 7 November 2003 | Leinster (Ireland) | 31–20 | (Wales) Llanelli Scarlets | Donnybrook |
| 19:35 | | Report | | Attendance: 2,300 |

| 29 November 2003 | Neath–Swansea Ospreys (Wales) | 25–36 | (Ireland) Leinster | The Gnoll |
| 17:30 | | Report | | Attendance: 4,046 |

| 2 January 2004 | Leinster (Ireland) | 32–30 | (Ireland) Ulster | Donnybrook |
| 19:35 | Try: Contepomi; Costello; Con: O'Meara (2); Pen: O'Meara (6) | Report | Try: Howe; Steinmetz; Humphreys; Con: Humphreys (3); Pen: Humphreys (3) | Attendance: 7,000 |

| 6 February 2004 | Newport Gwent Dragons (Wales) | 35–14 | (Ireland) Leinster | Rodney Parade |
| 19:05 | | Report | | Attendance: 3,476 |

| 13 February 2004 | Munster (Ireland) | 24–13 | (Ireland) Leinster | Musgrave Park |
| 19:35 | | Report | | Attendance: 5,400 |

| 20 February 2004 | Leinster (Ireland) | 16–37 | (Wales) Celtic Warriors | Donnybrook |
| 19:35 | | Report | | Attendance: 3,800 |

| 27 February 2004 | Edinburgh (Scotland) | 40–34 | (Ireland) Leinster | Murrayfield |
| 19:30 | | Report | | Attendance: 2,120 |

| 5 March 2004 | Leinster (Ireland) | 18–22 | (Wales) Cardiff Blues | Donnybrook |
| 19:30 | | Report | | Attendance: 2,150 |

| 13 March 2004 | Connacht (Ireland) | 35–24 | (Ireland) Leinster | Sportsground |
| 14:30 | | Report | | Attendance: 3,850 |

| 26 March 2004 | Leinster (Ireland) | 35–12 | (Scotland) Borders | Donnybrook |
| 19:30 | | Report | | Attendance: 2,384 |

| 2 April 2004 | Leinster (Ireland) | 31–30 | (Scotland) Glasgow | Donnybrook |
| 19:30 | | Report | | Attendance: 3,655 |

| 16 April 2004 | Llanelli Scarlets (Wales) | 51–20 | (Ireland) Leinster | Stradey Park |
| 19:30 | | Report | | Attendance: 5,679 |

| 30 April 2004 | Leinster (Ireland) | 16–16 | (Wales) Neath–Swansea Ospreys | Donnybrook |
| 19:30 | | Report | | Attendance: 1,068 |

| 7 May 2004 | Ulster (Ireland) | 28–6 | (Ireland) Leinster | Ravenhill |
| 19:30 | Try: Howe (2); Humphreys; Con: Humphreys (2); Pen: Humphreys (3) | Report | Pen: O'Meara (2) | Attendance: 12,000 |

| 14 May 2004 | Leinster (Ireland) | 56–39 | (Wales) Newport Gwent Dragons | Lansdowne Road |
| 19:35 | | Report | | Attendance: 2,520 |

== Heineken Cup ==
=== Pool 3 ===
| Team | P | W | D | L | Tries for | Tries against | Try diff | Points for | Points against | Points diff | TB | LB | Pts |
|---|---|---|---|---|---|---|---|---|---|---|---|---|---|
| (France) Biarritz Olympique | 6 | 4 | 0 | 2 | 18 | 12 | 6 | 139 | 97 | 42 | 3 | 1 | 20 |
| (Ireland) Leinster | 6 | 4 | 0 | 2 | 13 | 11 | 2 | 142 | 113 | 29 | 1 | 1 | 18 |
| (Wales) Cardiff Blues | 6 | 2 | 0 | 4 | 13 | 13 | 0 | 123 | 132 | −9 | 0 | 3 | 11 |
| (England) Sale Sharks | 6 | 2 | 0 | 4 | 6 | 14 | −8 | 75 | 137 | −62 | 0 | 1 | 9 |

| 6 December 2003; 15:00 | Leinster (Ireland) | 32–6 | (France) Biarritz | Lansdowne Road |
| | | | | Attendance: 7,200 |

| 12 December 2003; 19:45 | Cardiff Blues (Wales) | 19–24 | (Ireland) Leinster | Cardiff Arms Park |
| | | | | Attendance: 5,000 |

| 9 January 2004; 19:45 | Leinster (Ireland) | 22–23 | (England) Sale Sharks | Lansdowne Road |
| | | | | Attendance: 14,200 |

| 18 January 2004; 15:00 | Sale Sharks (England) | 16–23 | (Ireland) Leinster | Edgeley Park |
| | | | | Attendance: 10,417 |

| 23 January 2004; 19:45 | Leinster (Ireland) | 20–17 | (Wales) Cardiff Blues | Lansdowne Road |
| | | | | Attendance: 23,463 |

| 31 January 2004; 16:00 | Biarritz (France) | 32–21 | (Ireland) Leinster | Parc des Sports Aquil |
| | | | | Attendance: 8,500 |
