= 2002–03 Leinster Rugby season =

- Ground(s): Donnybrook, Dublin
- Coach: Matt Williams
- League(s): Celtic League (5th in pool); Heineken Cup (semi-final)

2002-03 was Leinster's eighth season under professionalism, and their third under head coach Matt Williams.

In 2002–03, they became only the third team in the history of the European Cup to win all their games in pool play. They also went one step further in the playoffs than the previous season by reaching the semi-finals (for the first time since 1995–96), but lost at home against French side Perpignan, which was accompanied by an unsuccessful season in the Celtic League.

Malcolm O'Kelly was given the 2003 IRUPA players' player of the year award. Gordon D'Arcy won the try of the season award.

At the end of the season, Matt Williams was appointed as the head coach of Scotland. Gary Ella replaced him as Leinster head coach.

== Player transfers ==
=== Players in ===
- (Ireland) Des Dillon from (Ireland) Connacht
- (New Zealand) Ben Gissing from (Italy) Rugby Calvisano
- (Ireland) Aidan Kearney from (Ireland) Ulster
- (England) Matthew Leek from (England) Wasps (Ireland) Kieran Lewis
- (Ireland) John Lyne
- (Ireland) Brian O'Riordan
- (Australia) Christian Warner from (France) Pau

=== Players out ===
- (England) Steve Barretto
- (Ireland) James Blaney to (Ireland) Munster
- (Ireland) Trevor Brennan to (France) Toulouse
- (Ireland) Bob Casey to (England) London Irish
- (Ireland) Emmett Farrell

== Squad ==
Leinster Rugby squad
**Props**: (Ireland) **Emmet Byrne**; (Ireland) **Reggie Corrigan**; (Ireland) Peter Coyle; (Ireland) John Lyne; (Ireland) Niall Treston; (Ireland) **Paul Wallace**; **Hookers**: (Ireland) David Blaney; (Ireland) **Shane Byrne**; (Ireland) Gavin Hickie; (Ireland) Peter Smyth; **Locks**: (Ireland) Niall Breslin; (Ireland) Leo Cullen; (New Zealand) Ben Gissing; (Ireland) Aidan Kearney; (Ireland) **Malcolm O'Kelly**	**Back row**: (Ireland) **Victor Costello**; (Ireland) Des Dillon; (Ireland) Keith Gleeson; (Ireland) Shane Jennings; (Ireland) Aidan McCullen; (Ireland) **Eric Miller**; (Ireland) Liam Toland; **Scrum-halves**: (Ireland) **Brian O'Meara**; (Ireland) Brian O'Riordan; (New Zealand) Ben Willis; **Fly-halves**: (Ireland) Andy Dunne; (England) Matthew Leek; (New Zealand) Nathan Spooner; (Australia) Christian Warner	**Centres**: (Ireland) **Shane Horgan**; (Ireland) Kieran Lewis; (Australia) **Adam Magro**; (Ireland) **Brian O'Driscoll**; (Ireland) David Quinlan; **Wings**: (Ireland) **Gordon D'Arcy**; (Ireland) **Denis Hickie** (c); (Ireland) Simon Keogh; (Ireland) **John McWeeney**; **Fullbacks**: (Ireland) **Girvan Dempsey**; (Ireland) Peter McKenna
(c) denotes the team captain, **Bold** denotes internationally capped players.^{*} denotes players qualified to play for Ireland on residency or dual nationality.

== Celtic League ==
=== Pool B Table ===
	Team	Pld	W	D	L	PF	PA	PD	TF	TA	Try bonus	Losing bonus	Pts
1	(Wales) Pontypridd	7	6	0	1	182	120	+62	15	12	2	0	26
2	(Scotland) Glasgow	7	5	0	2	216	166	+50	22	20	2	1	23
3	(Wales) Cardiff	7	4	0	3	178	151	+27	17	12	2	2	20
4	(Ireland) Connacht	7	5	0	2	126	176	−50	11	17	0	0	20
5	(Ireland) Leinster	7	3	0	4	191	154	+37	22	14	3	3	18
6	(Scotland) Borders	7	2	0	5	142	169	−27	15	11	1	3	12
7	(Wales) Bridgend	7	2	0	5	127	187	−60	11	20	1	1	10
8	(Wales) Newport	7	1	0	6	121	160	−39	9	16	0	4	8
Under the standard bonus point system, points are awarded as follows: 4 points for a win; 2 points for a draw; 1 bonus point for scoring 4 tries (or more) (Try bonus); 1 bonus point for losing by 7 points (or fewer) (Losing bonus)
Green background (rows 1 to 4) qualify for the knock-out stage. Source: RaboDirect PRO12

=== Pool B Fixtures ===
30 August 2002	Leinster (Ireland)	31–18	(Wales) Pontypridd	Donnybrook
19:35		Report		Attendance: 4,500

6 September 2002	Glasgow (Scotland)	25–21	(Ireland) Leinster	Hughenden
19:30		Report		Attendance: 4,250

13 September 2002	Leinster (Ireland)	23–26	(Ireland) Connacht	Donnybrook
19:35		Report		Attendance: 6,000

21 September 2002	Cardiff (Wales)	30–17	(Ireland) Leinster	Cardiff Arms Park
17:30		Report		Attendance: 6,500

27 September 2002	Borders (Scotland)	23–18	(Ireland) Leinster	Netherdale
19:30		Report		Attendance: 4,000

4 October 2002	Leinster (Ireland)	42–14	(Wales) Newport	Donnybrook
19:35		Report		Attendance: 6,000

26 October 2002	Bridgend (Wales)	18–39	(Ireland) Leinster	Brewery Field
14:30		Report		Attendance: 1,000

== Heineken Cup ==
=== Pool 4 ===
Team	P	W	D	L	Tries for	Tries against	Try diff	Points for	Points against	Points diff	Pts
(Ireland) Leinster	6	6	0	0	22	7	15	188	93	95	12
(England) Bristol Shoguns	6	3	0	3	15	17	−2	149	144	5	6
(France) Montferrand	6	2	0	4	15	8	7	141	120	21	4
(Wales) Swansea	6	1	0	5	8	28	−20	109	230	−121	2

11 October 2002; 19:15	Leinster (Ireland)	29–23	(England) Bristol Shoguns	Donnybrook
				Attendance: 6,000

19 October 2002; 19:30	Swansea (Wales)	10–51	(Ireland) Leinster	St. Helen's
				Attendance: 3,500

7 December 2002; 15:00	Montferrand (France)	20–23	(Ireland) Leinster	Stade Marcel-Michelin
				Attendance: 10,000

13 December 2002; 19:35	Leinster (Ireland)	12–9	(France) Montferrand	Donnybrook
				Attendance: 7,500

10 January 2003; 19:35	Leinster (Ireland)	48–19	(Wales) Swansea	Donnybrook
				Attendance: 7,500

19 January 2003; 13:45	Bristol Shoguns (England)	12–25	(Ireland) Leinster	Memorial Ground
				Attendance: 7,013

=== Quarter-final ===
12 April 2003; 15:35	Leinster (Ireland)	18–13	(France) Biarritz	Lansdowne Road
				Attendance: 46,000

=== Semi-final ===
27 April 2003; 14:45	Leinster (Ireland)	14–21	(France) Perpignan	Lansdowne Road
				Attendance: 37,000
