= 2005 Ireland rugby union tour of Japan =

- Manager: Niall O'Donovan
- Tour captain: David Humphreys
- Top test point scorer: David Humphreys (25)
- Top test try scorer: Frankie Sheahan (3)
Summary
P	W	D	L
Total
2	2	0	0
Test match
2	2	0	0
Opponent
P	W	D	L
Japan
2	2	0	0

Tour chronology
- ← South Africa 2004 New Zealand & Australia 2006 →

2005 Ireland rugby union tour of Japan. Eleven Ireland players, including their captain Brian O'Driscoll, plus their coach Eddie O'Sullivan were included in the British & Irish Lions squad for their tour of New Zealand. As a result, the Ireland squad for this tour featured nine previously uncapped players and an interim coach.

== Touring party ==
- Manager: Niall O'Donovan
- Assistant manager: Michael Bradley
- Assistant manager: Mark McCall
- Captain: David Humphreys

=== Backs ===
(*) = international test debuts

- Tommy Bowe (Belfast Harlequins/Ulster)
- Kieran Campbell (Dungannon RFC/Ulster) (*)
- Girvan Dempsey (Terenure College RFC/Leinster)
- Gavin Duffy (NEC Harlequins)
- Anthony Horgan (Cork Constitution/Munster)
- David Humphreys (Dungannon RFC/Ulster)
- Kieran Lewis (St. Mary's College RFC/Leinster) (*)
- Conor McPhillips (St. Mary's College RFC/Connacht)
- Kevin Maggs (Belfast Harlequins/Ulster)
- David Quinlan (Blackrock College RFC/Leinster) (*)
- Peter Stringer (Shannon RFC/Munster)
- Paddy Wallace (Ballymena RFC/Ulster)

=== Forwards ===
(*) = international test debuts

- Simon Best (Belfast Harlequins/Ulster)
- Reggie Corrigan (Greystones RFC/Leinster)
- Leo Cullen (Blackrock College RFC/Leinster)
- Simon Easterby (Llanelli RFC)
- Trevor Hogan (Shannon RFC/Munster) (*)
- Marcus Horan (Shannon RFC/Munster)
- Bernard Jackman (Clontarf RFC/Connacht) (*)
- Denis Leamy (Cork Constitution/Munster)
- Eric Miller (Terenure College RFC/Leinster)
- Matt McCullough (Ballymena RFC/Ulster) (*)
- Johnny O'Connor (London Wasps)
- Frankie Sheahan (Cork Constitution/Munster)
- David Wallace (Garryowen/Munster)
- Roger Wilson (Belfast Harlequins/Ulster) (*)

== Matches ==
12 June 2005

Japan	12–44	Ireland
Pen: Morita 4	Report	Try: Best, Bowe; Maggs, Sheahan; Con: Humphreys, Staunton 2 Pen: Humphreys 2, Staunton 4

Nagai Stadium, Osaka
Attendance: 20,000
Referee: Nigel Owens (Wales)

Japan: 15. Goshi Tachikawa, 14. Daisuke Ohata (yellow card) , 13. Reuben Parkinson, 12. Yukio Motoki, 11. Hiroki Mizuno, 10. Kyohei Morita, 9. Wataru Murata, 8. Takuro Miuchi (c), 7. Ryota Asano Inose, 6. Hare Makiri, 5. Jamie Washington, 4. Takanori Kumagae, 3. Ryo Yamamura, 2. Ken Tsukagoshi, 1.Hiroshi Takahashi – Replacements: 17. Kenji Kasai, 18. Shigeyasu Takagi, 19. Hitoshi Ono, 20. Shota Goto, 21. Tomoaki Nakai, 22. Teppei Tomioka – Unused: 16. Masakazu Nakabayashi
Ireland: 15. Girvan Dempsey, 14. Tommy Bowe, 13. Gavin Duffy, 12. Kevin Maggs, 11. Anthony Horgan, 10. David Humphreys (c), 9. Peter Stringer, 8. Roger Wilson, 7. Johnny O'Connor, 6. Alan Quinlan, 5. Matt McCullough, 4. Leo Cullen, 3. Simon Best, 2. Frankie Sheahan, 1. Marcus Horan – Replacements: 16. Bernard Jackman, 17. Reggie Corrigan, 18. Trevor Hogan, 19. Eric Miller, 20. Kieran Campbell, 21. Jeremy Staunton, 22. David Quinlan

19 June 2005

Japan	18–47	Ireland
Try: Ohata 2 Con: Hirose; Pen: Hirose 2	Report	Try: Dempsey, Duffy 2 Humphreys, Sheahan 2 Wallace; Con: Humphreys 6

Chichibu, Tokyo
Attendance: 20,000
Referee: Nigel Whitehouse (Wales)

Japan: 15. Goshi Tachikawa, 14. Daisuke Ohata, 13. Reuben Parkinson, 12. Yukio Motoki, 11. Hirotoki Onozawa, 10. Keiji Hirose, 9. Wataru Murata, 8. Takuro Miuchi (c), 7. Ryota Asano Inose, 6. Hare Makiri, 5. Takanori Kumagae, 4. Hajime Kiso, 3. Ryo Yamamura, 2. Masakazu Nakabayashi, 1. Shigeyasu Takagi (yellow card) – Replacements: 16. Ken Tsukagoshi, 17. Kenji Kasai, 18. Tomoaki Nakai, 19. Takeomi Ito, 20. Shota Goto, 21. Teppei Tomioka, 22. Ayumu Goromaru
Ireland: 15. Girvan Dempsey, 14. Tommy Bowe, 13. Gavin Duffy, 12. David Quinlan, 11. Anthony Horgan, 10. David Humphreys (c), 9. Peter Stringer, 8. Eric Miller, 7. David Wallace, 6. Denis Leamy, 5. Matt McCullough, 4. Leo Cullen, 3. Simon Best, 2. Frankie Sheahan, 1. Marcus Horan – Replacements: 16. Bernard Jackman, 17. Reggie Corrigan, 18. Trevor Hogan, 19. Alan Quinlan, 20. Kieran Campbell, 21. Jeremy Staunton, 22. Kieran Lewis
