= 2000–01 Munster Rugby season =

- Ground(s): Thomond Park (Capacity: 13,200); Musgrave Park (Capacity: 8,300)
- CEO: Garrett Fitzgerald
- Coach: Declan Kidney
- Captain: Mick Galwey

The 2000–01 Munster Rugby season was Munster's sixth season as a professional team, during which they competed in the IRFU Interprovincial Championship and Heineken Cup. It was Declan Kidney's third season in his first spell as head coach of the province.

== 2000–01 squad ==
Note: Flags indicate national union under World Rugby eligibility rules. Players may hold more than one non-World Rugby nationality.

Player	Position	Union
James Blaney	Hooker	Ireland
John Fogarty	Hooker	Ireland
Frankie Sheahan	Hooker	Ireland
Peter Clohessy	Prop	Ireland
John Hayes	Prop	Ireland
Marcus Horan	Prop	Ireland
Mick Galwey (c)	Lock	Ireland
John Langford	Lock	Australia
Donncha O'Callaghan	Lock	Ireland
Paul O'Connell	Lock	Ireland
Mick O'Driscoll	Lock	Ireland
Anthony Foley	Back row	Ireland
Eddie Halvey	Back row	Ireland
Alan Quinlan	Back row	Ireland
David Wallace	Back row	Ireland
Jim Williams	Back row	Australia

Player	Position	Union
Frank Murphy	Scrum-half	Ireland
Mike Prendergast	Scrum-half	Ireland
Peter Stringer	Scrum-half	Ireland
Ronan O'Gara	Fly-half	Ireland
Jeremy Staunton	Fly-half	Ireland
Rob Henderson	Centre	Ireland
Jason Holland	Centre	Ireland
Killian Keane	Centre	Ireland
Mike Mullins	Centre	Ireland
Anthony Horgan	Wing	Ireland
John Kelly	Wing	Ireland
John O'Neill	Wing	Ireland
Dominic Crotty	Fullback	Ireland

== 2000–01 IRFU Interprovincial Championship ==
Team	P	W	D	L	F	A	BP	Pts	Status
Munster	6	5	1	0	151	99	1	23	Champions; qualified for next season's Heineken Cup
Ulster	6	3	0	3	144	119	3	15	Qualified for next season's Heineken Cup
Leinster	6	2	1	3	109	111	2	12	Qualified for next season's Heineken Cup
Connacht	6	1	0	5	100	175	1	5	

1 September 2000

Ulster (Ireland)	16–21	(Ireland) Munster
Try: Ward; Con: Humphreys; Pen: Humphreys (3)	Report	Pen: O'Gara (5); Drop: O'Gara (2)

Ravenhill

8 September 2000

Munster (Ireland)	26–20	(Ireland) Leinster
	Report

Musgrave Park

15 September 2000

Munster (Ireland)	36–13	(Ireland) Connacht
	Report

Thomond Park

23 September 2000

Connacht (Ireland)	13–23	(Ireland) Munster
	Report

Galway Sportsgrounds

29 September 2000

Munster (Ireland)	29–21	(Ireland) Ulster
Try: Crotty, Horgan; Con: O'Gara (2); Pen: O'Gara (5)	Report	Try: Free, J. Topping; Con: Humphreys; Pen: Humphreys (3)

Thomond Park

3 November 2000

Leinster (Ireland)	16–16	(Ireland) Munster
	Report

Donnybrook

== 2000–01 Heineken Cup ==
=== Pool 4 ===
Team	P	W	D	L	Tries for	Tries against	Try diff	Points for	Points against	Points diff	Pts
(Ireland) Munster	6	5	0	1	15	7	8	154	109	45	10
(England) Bath	6	4	0	2	14	11	3	139	106	33	8
(Wales) Newport	6	2	0	4	10	22	−12	122	183	−61	4
(France) Castres	6	1	0	5	14	13	1	135	152	−17	2

7 October 2000
14:30

Munster (Ireland)	26–18	(Wales) Newport
	Report

Thomond Park
Attendance: 9,200

14 October 2000
19:30

Castres (France)	29–32	(Ireland) Munster
	Report

Stade Pierre-Antoine
Attendance: 7,500
Referee: Gareth Simmonds

21 October 2000
14:30

Munster (Ireland)	31–9	(England) Bath
	Report

Thomond Park
Attendance: 13,400
Referee: Joel Dumé

28 October 2000
17:00

Bath (England)	18–5	(Ireland) Munster
	Report

Recreation Ground
Attendance: 8,200
Referee: Nigel Whitehouse

13 January 2001
17:35

Newport (Wales)	24–39	(Ireland) Munster
	Report

Rodney Parade
Attendance: 11,431
Referee: Joël Jutge

20 January 2001
14:30

Munster (Ireland)	21–11	(France) Castres
	Report

Musgrave Park
Attendance: 9,000
Referee: Chris White

=== Quarter-final ===
28 January 2001
14:45

Munster (Ireland)	38–29	(France) Biarritz
	Report

Thomond Park
Attendance: 14,000
Referee: Ed Morrison

=== Semi-final ===
21 April 2001
15:00

Stade Français (France)	16–15	(Ireland) Munster
	Report

Stadium Nord
Attendance: 20,400
