= Vermaas =

Vermaas is a surname. Notable people with the surname include:

- Caden VerMaas (born 2006), American football safety
- Harry Vermaas (born 1984), South African rugby union player
