= Shaun Berne =

Australian rugby union player (born 1979)

- Born: Shaun Berne; 8 January 1979 (age 47) Sydney, Australia
- Height: 5 ft 11 in (1.80 m)
- Weight: 13 st 6 lb (85 kg)
- Notable relative(s): John Berne (father); Michael Berne (brother)

Rugby union career
- Position: Centre/Fly-half
Senior career
Years	Team	Apps	(Points)
1999–01	Bath	39	(102)
2001–06	NSW Waratahs	38	(57)
2006–09	Bath	83	(185)
2009–11	Leinster	23	(70)
2011–13	Calvisano	42	(16)
- Correct as of 19 May 18000
International career
Years	Team	Apps	(Points)
1999	Australia under 21s	2	
2003–05	Australia A	5	
- Correct as of 12 August 2009

Shaun Berne (born 8 January 1979) is an Australian rugby union coach and former player. He is currently an assistant coach with the Western Force. His professional playing career spanned twelve seasons, where he played for New South Wales Waratahs, as well as Bath, Leinster, and Calvisano. His usual playing positions were fly-half and centre.

== Family and early life ==
Shaun Berne was born in Sydney. His father John Berne had played rugby for Australia in the 1970s, and his younger brother Michael also made a rugby career and played professionally in Ireland as a centre for Leinster. Berne attended Marcellin College Randwick and was selected for the Australian under-16 rugby team in 1995. He played club rugby for Randwick and represented Australia under 21s on two occasions in 1999.

== Rugby career ==
Berne moved to England to play two seasons for Bath Rugby from 1999 to 2001, and was selected for the Barbarians in 2000. He returned to Australia to join the NSW Waratahs, making 38 Super 12 appearances and scoring 57 points (including 6 tries) between 2003 and 2006. He was capped on five occasions for Australia A, before returning to Europe.

After a further three successful seasons at Bath from 2006 to 2009, Berne had made a total of 119 appearances for that club all competitions (totalling 282 points), including 27 European caps. He then joined Irish province Leinster for two seasons, coached by Michael Cheika. Berne played the final two seasons of his professional career at Italian club Calvisano.

== Coaching ==
Berne worked as a coach in Leinster's elite player development program in 2015–16, before signing with the Western Force as attack coach in 2017.
