= James Blaney =

- Born: 21 February 1974 (age 52) Dublin, Ireland
- Height: 1.83 m (6 ft 0 in)
- Weight: 89 kg (14.0 st; 196 lb)
- Notable relative(s): Brian Blaney (brother); David Blaney (brother)

Rugby union career
- Position: Hooker
Amateur team(s)
| Years | Team | Apps | (Points) |
- Terenure College
Senior career
| Years | Team | Apps | (Points) |
| 1994–2000 | Leinster | | |
| 2000–2005 | Munster | 25 | (10) |
International career
| Years | Team | Apps | (Points) |
- Ireland A
Coaching career
- Years: Team
- 2006–2012: Terenure College (Forwards Coach)
- 2012–2019: Terenure College (Head Coach)
- 2019–: Blackrock College (Head Coach)

Achievements- 8.7 handicap James Blaney (born 21 February 1974) is an Irish former rugby union player and current coach.

== Career ==
Blaney began his playing career with native province Leinster in 1994, before joining their rivals Munster ahead of the 2000–01 season and spending five seasons with the southern province, during which time they reached the Heineken Cup final in 2002, won the Celtic League in 2002–03 and the Celtic Cup in 2004–05. Blaney also represented Ireland A during his career, the team one level below the senior national team.

Having played for Terenure College in the amateur All-Ireland League, Blaney transitioned into coaching in 2006, first as a player-coach and then as an assistant coach with Terenure. He was appointed the club's new head coach in 2012, a position he held until leaving the club 2019 after he was appointed as the new head coach of Blackrock College ahead of the 2019–20 All-Ireland League season.
