= George Norton (rugby union) =

Ireland international rugby union player & referee

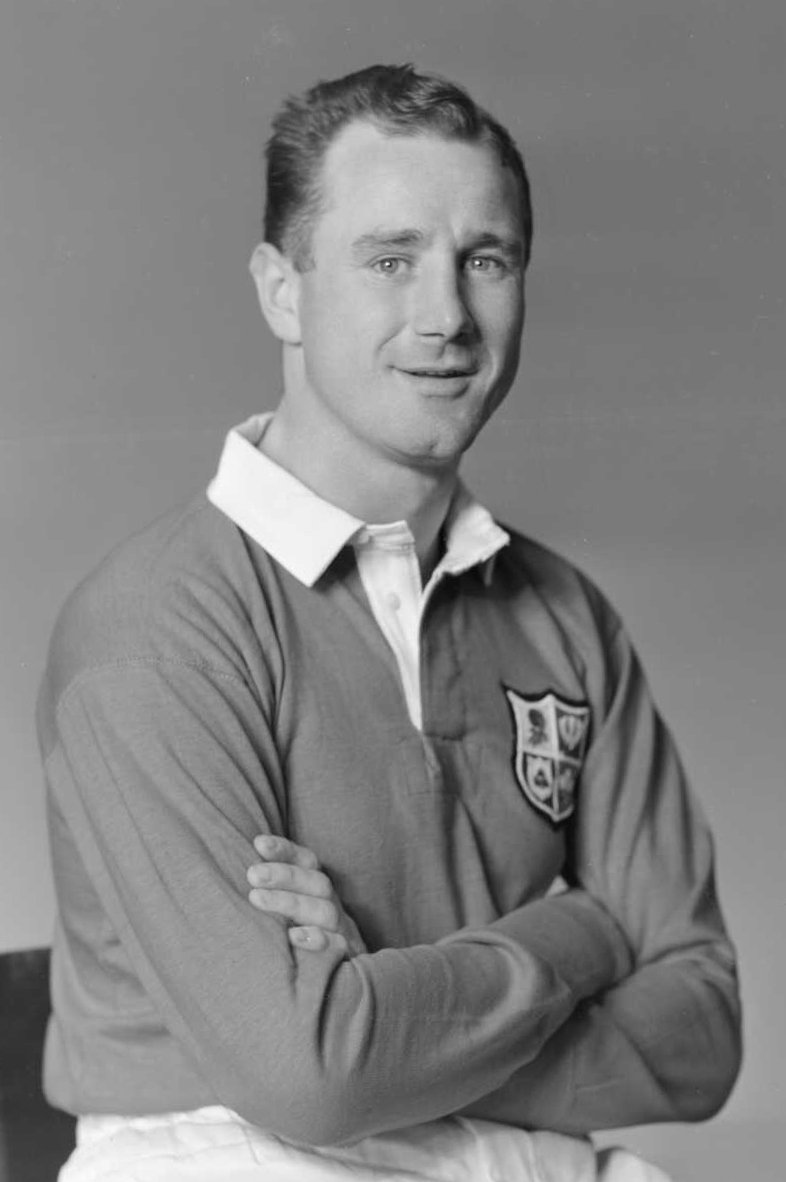
- Norton in New Zealand in 1950
- Born: George William Norton; 1 April 1920 Dublin, Ireland
- Died: 7 October 1999 (aged 79) Dublin, Ireland
- School: St Mary's College, Dublin
- Notable relative(s): Dave Gannon; AJ MacGinty (grandsons)

Rugby union career
- Position: Fullback
Senior career
Years	Team	Apps	(Points)
?	Bective Rangers	?	(?)
International career
Years	Team	Apps	(Points)
1949–1951	Ireland	11	(41)

George William Norton (1 April 1920 – 7 October 1999) was an Irish rugby union player who played in the fullback position. Norton played club rugby with Bective Rangers, represented Leinster at provincial level, was capped 11 times for Ireland, and was a member of the British Lions team that toured in 1950.

== Rugby career ==
Norton picked up the game of rugby while in school at St Mary's College, Dublin. He joined St Mary's College RFC but struggled to displace his brother Austin from the team for his preferred position of fullback. Switching codes to play for Shamrock Rovers for a year or so, he moved club to Bective Rangers where he spent the remainder of his playing career. A first appearance for the provincial Leinster team came in 1947.

In Ireland's first game of the 1949 Five Nations Championship against France, Norton started the game at fullback to make his international debut. He went on to play in all four of Ireland's games in that year's tournament, which culminated with Ireland being crowned champions and clinching the Triple Crown. During the tournament, Norton scored a total of 26 points, then a record for most points scored by a player in a single championship. The Barbarians invitation team included Norton in their 1949 Easter tour, where he played in two matches against Penarth and Newport. He again featured in all four of Ireland's matches in the 1950 Five Nations, which led to his inclusion in the British Lions squad that was selected to tour New Zealand and Australia later that year. Norton appeared in three out of the first five games that the Lions played on tour against local opposition teams, but sustained an injury in that third game against Southland that ended his participation in the tour.

Norton returned to play for Ireland in the 1951 Five Nations Championship. He featured in the first three of Ireland's games against France, England and Scotland but suffered an injury in that game against Scotland resulted in him being unable to play in their final game of the tournament against Wales. Ireland again clinched the Championship, but the shoulder injury was serious enough to force Norton to give up playing rugby.

== Post-playing career ==
Following his retirement from playing the game, Norton took up refereeing. He also was president of Bective Rangers. In 1998, he was inducted into the Rugby Writers of Ireland Hall of Fame.
