= Niamh Redmond =

Irish former model

Niamh Marie Redmond (born 1976 or 1977) is an Irish former model and beauty pageant titleholder who was crowned Miss Ireland 1996.

Born to parents Ronald and Orla, Redmond grew up the only female child with three brothers in Drimnagh. At the age of nineteen she represented Dublin at Miss Ireland and was crowned the winner.

Although her win qualified her to represent the country at Miss Universe 1997, Redmond – who had deferred a place at Maynooth College to prepare for the pageant – was controversially replaced by Miss Ireland second runner-up Fiona Mullaly. When queried, pageant boss Kieran Murray stated that Mullaly was best suited to represent Ireland, and his decision to remove Redmond was a bid to raise the standard and profile of Miss Ireland. Redmond had previously been a contestant at Miss World 1996 where she was a favourite, but did not place, and former Miss Ireland boss Krish Naidoo, who defended Murray, claimed that Redmond had failed to impress the judges because she had given up completely.

As a model, Redmond was lined to promote a range of summer clothing for Lee Jeans alongside Fair City actor Peter Warnock, but came under fire when she appeared in a contraceptives commercial shortly after being crowned. Redmond graduated with a degree in finance, and worked in IT after her reign.

She is married to former Ireland rugby player and businessman Aidan McCullen. She has two sons.
