= 2001 Samoa rugby union tour of Europe =

Summary
P	W	D	L
Total
4	2	0	2
Test match
2	1	0	1
Opponent
P	W	D	L
Ireland
1	1	0	0
Italy
1	0	0	1

The 2001 Samoa rugby union tour of Europe was a series of matches played in November 2001 in Ireland and Italy by Samoa national rugby union team.

== Results ==
'Scores and results list Samoa's points tally first.

Opponent	For	Against	Date	Venue	Status
Ireland Devel. XV	18	23	8 November 2001	Donnybrook Stadium	Tour match
Ireland	8	35	11 November 2001	Lansdowne Road, Dublin	Test match
Cambridge University	37	29	17 November 2001	Cambridge	Tour match
Italy	17	9	24 November 2001	Stadio Fattori, L'Aquila	Test match
