= AJ MacGinty =

American rugby union player (born 1990)

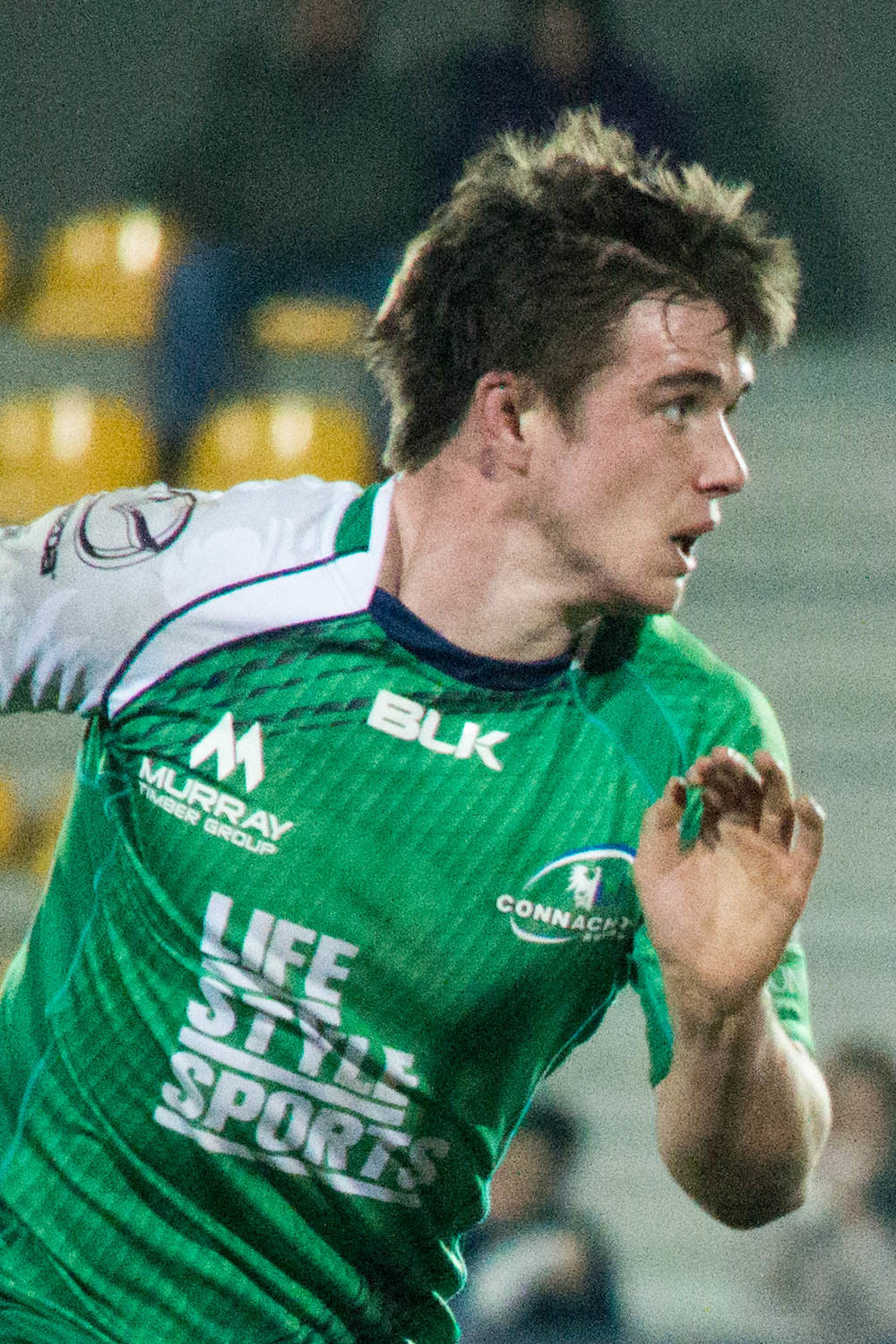
- MacGinty in 2016
- Born: Alan León MacGinty; 26 February 1990 (age 36) Dublin, Ireland
- Height: 1.85 m (6 ft 1 in)
- Weight: 93 kg (14 st 9 lb)
- School: Blackrock College
- University: Life University
- Notable relative(s): Dave Gannon (cousin); George Norton (grandfather); Leon Ó Broin (great grandfather)

Rugby union career
- Position: Fly-half
- Current team: Bristol Bears
Amateur team(s)
Years	Team	Apps	(Points)
2011	NYAC		
2012–2015	Life Running Eagles		
Senior career
Years	Team	Apps	(Points)
2015–2016	Connacht	16	(64)
2016–2022	Sale Sharks	107	(878)
2022–	Bristol Bears	51	(347)
- Correct as of 15 September 2026
International career
Years	Team	Apps	(Points)
2015–	United States	43	(425)
- Correct as of 31 August 2025

Alan León MacGinty (US: /ˈæl.ən leɪˈoʊn məkˈɡɪn.ti/; born 26 February 1990), known as AJ (US: /ˈeɪ.dʒeɪ/), is an American professional rugby union player who plays as a fly-half for Premiership Rugby club Bristol Bears. Born in Ireland, he represents the United States national team.

== Early life ==
A graduate of Blackrock College, MacGinty played with the Blackrock College RFC academy before moving to New York on a visa where he began playing with NYAC under head coach of THE AC Bruce McLane. In 2012 MacGinty moved to Marietta, Georgia, where he began a master's degree in Sport Health Science and excelled on the rugby pitch at out-half for the Life Running Eagles.

== Club career ==
=== Connacht ===
Following his participation in the 2015 Rugby World Cup, MacGinty was signed by Connacht for the 2015–16 Pro12 season. Connacht head coach Pat Lam said the province had been following MacGinty since the Pacific Nations Cup earlier in the year. MacGinty made his domestic debut for Connacht appearing off the bench in their 33–19 win over Benetton Treviso on 6 November 2015. MacGinty made his European debut on 14 November 2015 in the first match of the 2015–16 Challenge Cup, starting at fly-half and scoring nine points. MacGinty led Connacht to a 28–23 bonus point win over Edinburgh in March 2016 and "controlled matters expertly" to manage Connacht's fifth consecutive win and maintain first place in the Pro12.

He was pivotal in Connacht's Pro12 final win securing the team's first ever silverware.

=== Sale Sharks ===
In May 2016 it was announced that MacGinty would join English Premiership side Sale Sharks when his deal with Connacht finished in the summer, with South African-capped Marnitz Boshoff taking his place at the province. MacGinty was signed as a replacement for outgoing England international Danny Cipriani.

=== Bristol Bears ===
On 10 November 2021 it was announced that MacGinty would be joining Bristol Bears at the end of the 21/22 season.

== International career ==
Having qualified through residency rules, MacGinty made his debut for the United States in July 2015 against Samoa during the Pacific Nations Cup. In the U.S. team's last match of the 2015 Pacific Nations Cup against Canada, MacGinty scored all of the team's points, including a last minute drop goal, to win the match 15–13. MacGinty was the U.S. team's leading scorer throughout the 2015 Pacific Nations Cup, scoring 44 points in three matches.

Following his performances in the Nations Cup, MacGinty was named in the American squad for the 2015 Rugby World Cup. He featured in three of the team's four games, starting in each of his appearances and scoring 25 points.

=== International tries ===
As of 12 July 2024

Try	Opposing team	Location	Venue	Competition	Date	Result	Score
1	Germany	Wiesbaden, Germany	BRITA-Arena	2017 end-of-year rugby union internationals	18 November 2017	Win	17 – 46
2	Chile	Maipu, Chile	Estadio Santiago Bueras	2019 Americas Rugby Championship	2 February 2019	Win	8 – 71
3	Chile	Maipu, Chile	Estadio Santiago Bueras	2019 Americas Rugby Championship	2 February 2019	Win	8 – 71
4	Chile	Maipu, Chile	Estadio Santiago Bueras	2019 Americas Rugby Championship	2 February 2019	Win	8 – 71
5	Samoa	Suva, Fiji	ANZ National Stadium	2019 World Rugby Pacific Nations Cup	3 August 2019	Win	13 – 10
6	Romania	Chicago, Illinois	SeatGeek Stadium	2024 mid-year rugby union tests	6 July 2024	Loss	20 – 22

== See also ==
- Rugby union in the United States
