= Shota Goto =

Japanese politician (born 1983)

- 後藤 翔太
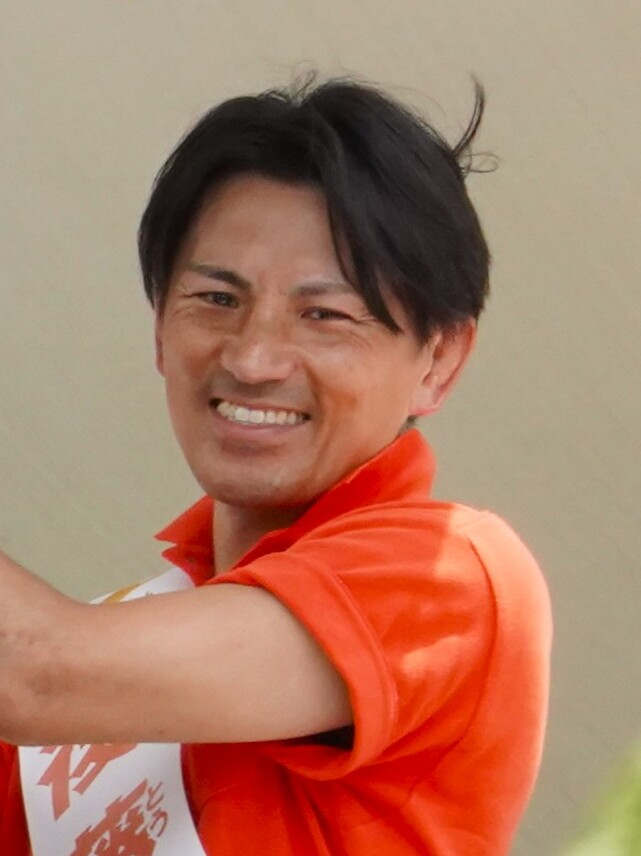
- Goto in 2025

Member of the House of Councillors
- Incumbent
- Assumed office 29 July 2025
- Constituency: National PR

Personal details
- Born: 7 January 1983 (age 43) Ōita City, Ōita, Japan
- Party: Sanseitō
- Education: Waseda University

Shota Goto (後藤翔太, Goto Shota; born 7 January 1983) is a Japanese politician and former rugby union player serving as a member of the House of Councillors since 2025. From 2005 to 2006, he played for the Japan national rugby union team.
