= Teppei Tomioka =

Japan international rugby union player

- Born: March 1, 1977 (age 49) Fukuoka
- Height: 5 ft 11 in (1.80 m)
- Weight: 207 lb (94 kg)

Rugby union career
- Position: Centre
Senior career
Years	Team	Apps	(Points)
- Toshiba Brave Lupus
International career
Years	Team	Apps	(Points)
2005	Japan	2	(0)

Teppei Tomioka (冨岡鉄平 Tomioka Teppei, born March 1, 1977) is the captain of the Toshiba Brave Lupus rugby team. He plays at centre. Originally from Fukuoka Prefecture, he was educated at Fukuoka Institute of Technology (Fukuoka Kougyou Daigaku). He is considered to be a powerful runner and leader of his team. He was voted the MVP of the Top League in 2007.

== External source ==
- Tomioka grabs MVP award, Daily Yomiuri, February 7, 2007
