= Matthew Leek =

England international rugby union player

Matthew Leek is a former Rugby Union player. He attended The John Fisher School in Croydon, Surrey.

He played for Saracens, London Wasps, and Leinster in Ireland.
