= Stephen Keogh =

- Born: Stephen Keogh; 10 May 1982 (age 44) Limerick, Ireland
- Height: 1.93 m (6 ft 4 in)
- Weight: 112 kg (17 st 9 lb)
- School: St. Munchin's College
- University: University College Cork

Rugby union career
- Position(s): No.8, Lock
Amateur team(s)
Years	Team	Apps	(Points)
- Bruff
–	St. Mary's College		
–	Shannon		
Senior career
Years	Team	Apps	(Points)
2003-2006	Munster	53	(10)
2006-2011	Leinster	85	(35)
International career
Years	Team	Apps	(Points)
- Ireland Schools
- Ireland Under-19
- Ireland u21
2007-08	Ireland A	4	(0)

Stephen Keogh (born 10 May 1982) is a former Irish rugby union player.

== Early life ==
Keogh was born in Limerick, Ireland, and grew up in Dromkeen, County Limerick. He attended St. Munchin's College before playing in the second-row for Ireland U21s in the World Cup in Johannesburg in June 2002. In the following season, playing number 8, Keogh led the U21s to Six Nations Championship victories over Scotland, Italy, France and England. His side's only defeat that year came against eventual champions Wales, the Irish defeated by the narrowest of margins (20–19) in Ebbw Vale.

== Professional career ==
Keogh made his Munster senior debut in the Celtic League in October 2003 before we went on to play 54 senior games (45 Celtic League, 9 Heineken Cup), scoring 10 points (2 tries), and captained the side on two occasions. He has played twice for the Ireland 'A' side.

Keogh moved to Leinster during March 2006 and been an integral part of the Leinster pack since then, having played over 30 times. During the months of February and March 2007 having featured prominently in the victories over Edinburgh and Connacht and also shone in the Heineken Cup quarter-final defeat to Wasps at the end of March, was announced as the Bank of Scotland (Ireland) Leinster Player of the Month for February/March.
