= Bryce Williams (rugby union) =

NZ rugby union player

- Born: 14 April 1980 (age 46) Dargaville, New Zealand
- Height: 2.03 m (6 ft 8 in)
- Weight: 118 kg (18 st 8 lb; 260 lb)

Rugby union career
- Position: Lock
Senior career
Years	Team	Apps	(Points)
2005–06	Leinster	21	(5)
2006–11	Bourgoin	67	(5)
Provincial / State sides
Years	Team	Apps	(Points)
2001–05	Auckland		
2011–13	Northland	27	(0)
Super Rugby
Years	Team	Apps	(Points)
2003	Crusaders	2	(0)
2004	Blues	6	(0)

Bryce Williams (born 14 April 1980 in Dargaville, New Zealand) is a former rugby union player who played for Northland in the ITM Cup competition.

== Playing career ==
Williams spent five seasons with Auckland and played briefly in Super Rugby for the Blues and Crusaders. He moved to Europe in 2005, spending a season with Leinster in the Celtic League and five seasons with Bourgoin in the French Top 14.

Williams returned to New Zealand in 2011, signing with Northland for the 2011 ITM Cup and continued as a squad regular before retiring in 2014.
