= Dave Gannon =

Irish rugby union player

- Born: David Gannon; 11 February 1983 (age 43) Dublin, Ireland
- Height: 1.98 m (6 ft 6 in)
- School: Blackrock College
- University: University College Dublin; Life University
- Notable relative(s): AJ MacGinty (cousin); George Norton (grandfather)

Rugby union career
- Position: Lock
- Current team: RUNY
Senior career
Years	Team	Apps	(Points)
2004–2005	Leinster	1	(0)
2005–2008	Connacht	67	(10)
2009	Southland		
2009–2011	Exeter	34	(0)
2011–2013	Connacht	20	(0)
2018–	RUNY		
- Correct as of 25 February 2018
International career
Years	Team	Apps	(Points)
2004	Ireland U21		
2007	Ireland A	3	(5)
- Correct as of 25 February 2018

Dave Gannon (born 11 February 1983) is a rugby union player from Ireland. He primarily plays as a lock, but has also played in the back row. Gannon currently plays with Rugby United New York (RUNY) in Major League Rugby (MLR).

Gannon started his career with his native province of Leinster, and spent the bulk of his career with Connacht across two spells with the side. He also spent a season with Southland Stags in New Zealand and two seasons with English side Exeter Chiefs.

== Early life ==
Born in Dublin, Gannon went to school in Blackrock College, graduating in 2001. At Blackrock, Gannon played for the school's rugby sides. He won the Leinster Junior Cup in 1998 and the Senior Seconds Cup in 1999. In 2001, he was part of the Blackrock squad that finished as runners-up in Leinster Senior Cup, losing to Terenure College in the final. Gannon later studied at University College Dublin and played for the university rugby team.

Gannon is a cousin of United States international player AJ MacGinty, who also played for Connacht.

== Club career ==
Gannon was part of Leinster's under-age system, but struggled to break through to the first team. He made a single appearance for the province, coming on as a replacement against Border Reivers in the 2004–05 Celtic League.

In 2005, he signed for rival province Connacht. In his first season, he made 12 league appearances and scored one try. He also featured from the bench against Catania in the group stage of the European Challenge Cup and started in the quarter-final defeat to Newcastle Falcons. In the following season, Gannon became a fixture in the starting team. He featured in 18 of the side's 20 games in the 2006–07 Celtic League and four of their six 2006–07 Challenge Cup games, starting on every occasion that he played. In the 2007–08 season, he played 16 times in the Celtic League and 4 times in the Challenge Cup. Gannon's final season in this spell with Connacht saw him feature less regularly. He played nine times in the league, starting just once, and played three times in the Challenge Cup. Gannon left Connacht in 2009, having played 67 times for the side in three seasons.

After leaving Connacht, Gannon went six months without a club before signing with National Provincial Championship side Southland in New Zealand. He was signed as backup to first choice locks Josh Bekhuis and Joe Tuineau. During his time there, the team won the country's most prestigious rugby trophy, the Ranfurly Shield, for the first time in 50 years.

After a successful season with Southland, he joined Exeter Chiefs in the English Championship in December 2009. The Chiefs were promoted in his first season there, and he played one season with the side in the Premiership before leaving in 2011. Gannon made a total of 34 appearances over his time with the Chiefs, starting in just seven of these.

Gannon rejoined Connacht on a one-year deal in September 2011, as injury cover for Dave Nolan. In his return season, he played nine times in the league, starting on five occasions. The 2011–12 season saw Connacht qualify for the Heineken Cup for the first time, and Gannon started three of their six games. He signed a further one-year contract extension in March 2012. However, the 2012–13 season saw Connacht play less frequently for Connacht than ever, featuring seven times in the Pro12 and once from the bench in the Heineken Cup. The lack of gametime saw him released to play with Blackrock in the All-Ireland League, where he played alongside his cousin AJ MacGinty for a brief period. At the end of the season, Gannon was released by Connacht, having made 20 appearances in his second spell with the team and earned 87 caps overall.

As he had done the first time he left Connacht, Gannon travelled overseas, this time joining MacGinty in the United States. He moved to Atlanta in early 2014, studying coaching and playing at Life University where MacGinty had been based since 2012. In 2018, Gannon was announced as part of the playing squad for Rugby United New York, the first ever professional rugby side in New York.

== International career ==
Gannon represented Ireland internationally at under-age level. In 2004, he captained the Ireland under-21 team in the World Championship. The side made the final before losing to the New Zealand team 47–19. Gannon also played for Ireland's second tier side Ireland A, now known as the Ireland Wolfhounds. He played for the team three times, first facing New Zealand Māori in 2007, before playing against Canada A and the England Saxons in the same year. He scored one try for the side, with that coming in his debut.
