= Michael Berne =

Australian rugby player

Personal information
- Full name: Michael Berne
- Born: 5 October 1981 (age 44) Sydney, Australia
- Height: 5 ft 11 in (1.80 m)
- Weight: 15 st 2 lb (96 kg)

Playing information

Rugby league
- Position: Wing
Club
Years	Team	Pld	T	G	FG	P
2002	South Sydney Rabbitohs	1	1	0	0	4
2003	Salford City Reds	5	1	0	0	0
	Total	6	2	0	0	4

Rugby union
- Position: Centre
Club
Years	Team	Pld	T	G	FG	P
2007–08	Leinster	7	2	0	0	0
Representative
Years	Team	Pld	T	G	FG	P
	Australia	0	0	0	0	0
- As of 16 Jul 2021

Michael Berne (born 1981) is an Australian rugby union and rugby league footballer. He played as centre for Leinster Rugby in 2007–2008.

Berne began playing junior footy for Coogee Randwick Wombats in the South Sydney Juniors competition. In 2002, he was with the South Sydney Rabbitohs and was the leading First Division try scorer. In 2003, he played for Salford City Reds, England for a season. He is the father of 2 children. Jack and Ruby Berne. Husband of Prue Berne nee Ryan.
