= Trevor Hogan =

Ireland international rugby union player

- Born: 19 November 1979 (age 46) Nenagh, Ireland
- Height: 6 ft 6 in (1.98 m)
- Weight: 17 st 12 lb (113 kg)
- School: CBS Nenagh
- University: Dublin City University

Rugby union career
- Position: Lock
- Current team: Shannon RFC
Provincial / State sides
Years	Team	Apps	(Points)
2002–2006	Munster	57	(5)
2006–2011	Leinster	59	(15)
- Correct as of 10 February 2015
International career
Years	Team	Apps	(Points)
2006–2009	Ireland A	12	(0)
2005–2007	Ireland	4	(0)
- Correct as of 10 February 2015

Trevor Hogan (born 19 November 1979) is an Irish former professional rugby union player. He attended Nenagh CBS and Dublin City University, from which he obtained an honours degree in journalism. He played rugby with Nenagh Ormond, Dublin University and Blackrock College RFC before joining Shannon RFC in 2002 whom he helped to victory in the All-Ireland League. He played for Munster until 2006, when he joined Leinster. He retired in January 2011 due to a knee injury

== Career ==
Hogan made his first start for Munster in 2003, where he went on to win 57 caps, 5 in the Heineken Cup. He scored, however, only one try in his spell there. While at Munster, he won his first Irish cap in 2005 against Japan during the Lions tour. He went on to win 3 caps for the national side. He went on to win 23 caps, including 7 Heineken cup caps, scoring 2 tries in the process. On 12 January 2011 he announced his immediate retirement from rugby at all levels. He cited that his decision was made due to persistent knee injuries over a number of years.

== Post-Rugby ==
Hogan participated in the attempt to break the Israeli blockade of Gaza with the Freedom Flotilla in June 2011, along with other pro-Palestinian activists. Before setting out, he wrote "The purpose, though, is not just to bring aid -- our goal is to end the siege and allow the people of Gaza to have their own functioning economy with the freedom to trade and travel, farm and fish their own territories."

Hogan became Nenagh Ormond RFC head coach in the Summer of 2011 and helped the club to gain promotion in the All-Ireland League. He subsequently moved back to Blackrock College RFC to take charge of the club's Under 20's academy. Trevor currently works with Leinster Rugby as Provincial Talent Coach.
