= Jonny Hepworth =

English rugby union & league footballer

Personal information
- Full name: Jonathan David Hepworth
- Born: 25 December 1982 (age 43) Castleford, Yorkshire, England

Playing information

Rugby league
- Position: Fullback, Wing, Centre, Stand-off, Hooker, Loose forward
Club
Years	Team	Pld	T	G	FG	P
2002–03	Leeds Rhinos	1	0	0	0	0
2002(loan)	→London Broncos	2	0	0	0	0
2003–05	Castleford Tigers	70	21	10	0	104
2011–13	Featherstone Rovers	67	29	0	0	116
	Total	140	50	10	0	220

Rugby union
Club
Years	Team	Pld	T	G	FG	P
2005	Leinster Rugby	6	1	0	0	5
	Leeds Tykes	0	0	0	0	0
2010	Rotherham Titans	0	0	0	0	0
	Total	6	1	0	0	5

Jonny Hepworth (born 25 December 1982) is an English former rugby league and rugby union footballer. He played club level rugby union (RU) for Leinster Rugby, Clontarf FC, Leeds Tykes, and, Rotherham R.U.F.C., and club level rugby league (RL) for Castleford Panthers ARLFC, Leeds Rhinos, London Broncos, Castleford Tigers and Featherstone Rovers.

He was born in Castleford. He currently plays for Featherstone Rovers. Hepworth previously played for the Leeds Tykes, making his début for them at Headingley Carnegie Stadium against London Welsh on 3 September 2006 at the start of the 2006–07 National League 1 season.

== Rugby league ==
=== Leeds Rhinos ===
Hepworth played junior rugby league for the Castleford Panthers ARLFC before joining Super League outfit Leeds Rhinos.

Hepworth captained the Leeds Rhinos Academy team when they beat local rivals the Bradford Bulls U-19 side in the Senior Academy Championship with a 12–7 victory in a Grand Final at Headingley in October 2002.

He made only one appearance for the Rhinos, under coach Daryl Powell, before briefly joining the London Broncos on loan in 2002 and his hometown club the Castleford Tigers, also on loan, in 2003. Broncos coach Tony Rea said on the arrival of Hepworth in May 2002: "He's an exciting young player and will give us some nice back-up." In 2011 he signed for Championship side Featherstone Rovers becoming a key figure in their side.

=== Castleford Tigers ===
Hepworth's move to Castleford Tigers was made permanent in July 2003, signing a three-year contract. Castleford were relegated from the Super League in 2004, but Hepworth helped them re-gain promotion, and played in the 2005 National Leagues One Grand Final victory against Whitehaven.

In September 2005 he switched codes and signed for Celtic League side Leinster.

=== Featherstone Rovers ===
Hepworth returned to rugby league with Championship side Featherstone Rovers in 2011. He retired in 2013 due to injuries.

== Rugby union ==
Before making his full début for Leinster against Edinburgh in Dublin on 6 November 2005 he said: "Apart from playing for a local team in Wakefield when I was 15, coming on against Bath was my first competitive game. But I think I've adapted well and fitted in well here."

"I'm picking up bits as we go along and settling in well, hopefully I can make a full début today and show what I can do."

"If I was switching to be a union forward it'd be difficult, but as a utility back in league you can fit in more quickly. In league there's not much kicking, it's mainly just torpedo kicks when you're punting."

"But here everyone can kick and our coach David Knox has been helping me out with that."

He also featured for Clontarf in North Dublin. He then signed for the Leeds Tykes, joining up again with Daryl Powell, the Leeds Tykes' first team coach.

Hepworth joined the Rotherham R.U.F.C. for the 2010–11 RFU Championship, and made an immediate impression with his pace in possession and tenacious defence.
