= Cameron Jowitt =

Cam Jowitt
- Born: Cameron Michael Jowitt; 5 February 1983 (age 43)
- Weight: 111 kg (17 st 7 lb)
- Occupation: Rugby player

Rugby union career
Senior career
Years	Team	Apps	(Points)
2005–2008	Leinster	55	(30)
- Correct as of 19 December 2020
Super Rugby
Years	Team	Apps	(Points)
2009	NSW Waratahs	1	(0)

Cameron Michael Jowitt (born 5 February 1983) is a retired Samoan/New Zealand rugby union footballer who played rugby in Ireland for Leinster Rugby, having originally come to Ireland to play for Dublin club, Lansdowne Football Club.

Jowitt was part of Leinster's Heineken Cup–winning panel in 2009, although he did not play in the final. In 2006, he scored an important try in the quarter-final against Stade Toulousain, one of four tries he scored in that year's competition. He was also part of the Leinster panel that secured the Celtic League in the 2007–08 season, scoring in the championship game of the competition. Jowitt was released by Leinster at the end of the 2008–09 season, moving first to Northland Rugby Union, before signing with the NSW Waratahs for the 2010 Super 14 season, where a foot injury curtailed his playing time and he was released before the start of the 2012 season.
