= Harry Vermaas =

South African rugby union player

- Born: Cornelis Hermanus Vermaas; January 23, 1984 (age 42)
- Height: 1.80 m (5 ft 11 in)
- Weight: 108 kg (238 lb)
- School: Afrikaanse Hoër Seunskool
- University: University of Pretoria
- Occupation: Professional rugby player

Rugby union career
- Position: Hooker
- Current team: USA Limoges
Provincial / State sides
Years	Team	Apps	(Points)
2005–06	Blue Bulls	2	(0)
2006–07	Leinster	14	(0)
2007–10	Boland	22	(0)
2010–13	AS Béziers	56	(15)
2014-	USA Limoges	14	(5)

Cornelis Hermanus "Harry" Vermaas (born 23 January 1984) is a South African rugby union rugbymen who currently plays for USA Limoges in the French domestic Fédérale 1 competition. He is a versatile front rower who is capable of playing either at prop or at hooker and has also represented Leinster, the Blue Bulls, Boland Cavaliers, Pumas and the Springboks' Under-21 team.
