= Gary Brown (rugby union) =

Irish rugby union player (born 1980)

- Born: 1 November 1980 (age 46) Dublin
- Height: 6 ft 1 in (1.85 m)
- School: Blackrock College
- University: University College Dublin

Rugby union career
- Position: Wing
Provincial / State sides
Years	Team	Apps	(Points)
2003-09	Leinster Rugby	63	(65)
- Correct as of 06-04-07
International career
Years	Team	Apps	(Points)
2008	Ireland A	2	(0)
National sevens team
Years	Team		Comps
- Ireland

Gary Brown (born 1 November 1980) is a professional rugby union player. Brown attended Blackrock College and later played for Blackrock College RFC.

== Leinster career ==
Brown made his first start for Leinster in 2003, in the Celtic League, in the 29–22 loss to Celtic Warriors at Sardis Road. Brown would go on to earn 43 caps in the competition, playing in the positions of fullback, center and wing, scoring 11 tries. Brown then played in his first Heineken Cup game in the 9–25 win against Treviso in Italy in 2004. It was the first of 4 caps, before he opened up his try tally with a brilliant touchdown against Bourgoin in Lansdowne Road.

Following Leinster's Heineken Cup win in May 2009 Brown announced his retirement from professional rugby to concentrate on his studies. He is currently playing for Wanderers FC.
