= Aidan McCullen =

Irish businessman and former rugby union player

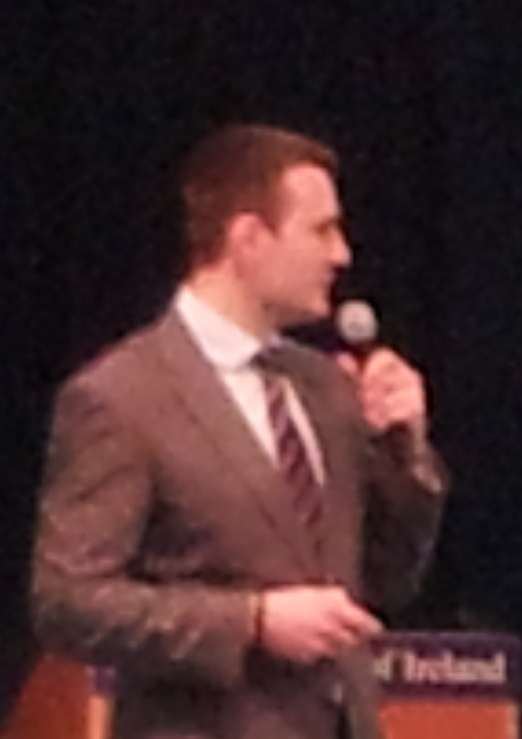
- Born: 5 January 1977 (age 49) Dublin, Ireland
- Height: 1.93 m (6 ft 4 in)
- Weight: 110 kg (17 st 5 lb)
- School: Castleknock College
- University: Trinity College Dublin

Rugby union career
- Position: Back row
Amateur team(s)
Years	Team	Apps	(Points)
1999–2001	Lansdowne		
Senior career
Years	Team	Apps	(Points)
1998–1999	Dax		
2001–2005	Leinster	60	(30)
2005–2006	Toulouse	16	(0)
2006–2008	London Irish	14	(0)
- Correct as of 31 May 2008
International career
Years	Team	Apps	(Points)
1998	Ireland U21		
2003	Ireland	1	(0)
- Correct as of 30 June 2003
National sevens team
Years	Team		Comps
2001	Ireland 7s		

Aidan McCullen (born 5 January 1977) is an Irish businessman, broadcaster and former Ireland national rugby union team player. McCullen hosts The Innovation Show, a weekly podcast featuring interviews with people involved in innovation, strategy and leadership. He is also the founder of the "Reinvention Summit", an annual innovation and transformation event held in Dublin. McCullen is married to former Miss Ireland model Niamh Redmond. They have two sons.

== Rugby career ==
McCullen started playing rugby at Castleknock College after moving to Dublin from County Meath. He represented Leinster at schools level and captained both the Leinster under-19 and under-20 teams before progressing to the Ireland U21 side.

In 1998, after playing for Ireland U21s, McCullen spent a season with US Dax in the French first division before returning to Ireland to join Lansdowne Football Club in the All-Ireland League. He signed for Leinster Rugby in 2001 as Irish rugby shifted its focus from the All-Ireland League to the emerging Celtic League. That year he also represented the Ireland Sevens in the 2001 Rugby World Cup Sevens.

McCullen made 60 appearances for Leinster and earned a senior international cap for Ireland in a match against Samoa on 20 June 2003.

In 2005, he signed for Toulouse. The French newspaper La Dépêche described him as a "bonne pioche" (a "good pick") for the club. Although he broke into the starting team and played 16 games for Toulouse over a period of 6 months, a knee injury limited his time at the club. He joined London Irish in 2006, remaining with that club until 2008.

McCullen later returned to Ireland and served as a player-coach with Lansdowne from the 2008/2009 season.

For several years, McCullen also worked as a rugby commentator with Setanta Sports (later Eir Sport).

== Business career ==
As of 2013, McCullen was "head of digital" at Communicorp. He was involved in developing the digital infrastructure at the organisation and promoted the concept of "Radio You Can Read", an early multimedia extension of the Newstalk 106–108 brand.

In January 2016, McCullen joined RTÉ as "head of innovation partnerships and funding". He later worked with the business think-tank Katawave. He wrote Undisruptable: A Mindset of Permanent Reinvention for Individuals, Organisations and Life, a business and management book published by Wiley in 2021.

He is a consultant, a speaker at international events, and lectures in Trinity College Business School. He is also a non-executive board director for National Broadband Ireland and the Rise Global Foundation. McCullen is the founder of the "Reinvention Summit", an annual event focused on organisational reinvention and innovation, held in Dublin.

McCullen also hosts The Innovation Show, a weekly podcast programme published online and broadcast on RTÉ Radio 1 Extra. In 2025, he received the "Thinkers50 Innovation Award" for his work on the podcast.
