= David Quinlan (rugby union, born 4 January 1978) =

Irish rugby player

- Born: David Peter Quinlan; 4 January 1978 (age 48) Dublin, Ireland
- Height: 1.93 m (6 ft 4 in)
- Weight: 103 kg (16 st 3 lb; 227 lb)
- School: Blackrock Coll
- University: Cambridge

Rugby union career
- Position: Inside centre
Amateur team(s)
| Years | Team | Apps | (Points) |
- Blackrock Coll
Senior career
| Years | Team | Apps | (Points) |
| 2005–2007 | Northampton | | |
Provincial / State sides
| Years | Team | Apps | (Points) |
| 2001-05 | Leinster | 48 | (5) |
International career
| Years | Team | Apps | (Points) |
| 2003-06 | Ireland A | 7 | (0) |
| 2005 | Ireland | 2 | (0) |
National sevens team
| Years | Team | | Comps |
| 2001 | Ireland 7s | | |

David Quinlan (born 4 January 1978) is a retired Irish rugby player. He played for Blackrock College, Leinster and Northampton, as well as earning two caps for the Irish national team. His position of choice was as an inside centre. He retired due to injury in 2007.
