= Des Dillon (rugby union) =

Irish rugby union footballer

- Born: Desmond Dillon; 25 January 1980 (age 46)
- Height: 1.98 m (6 ft 6 in)
- Weight: 114 kg (17 st 13 lb; 251 lb)
- School: Clongowes Wood College
- University: University College Dublin

Rugby union career
- Position: No. 8, Backrow, Secondrow
Amateur team(s)
Years	Team	Apps	(Points)
- UCD, Carlow, Blackrock, Lansdowne
Senior career
Years	Team	Apps	(Points)
2000-2001	Connacht Rugby		
2001-2007	Leinster Rugby		
International career
Years	Team	Apps	(Points)
- Ireland U19 (Captain)
–	Ireland U21		
–	Ireland A		
–	Ireland Sevens		

Des Dillon (born 25 January 1980) is an Irish rugby union footballer. Dillon emerged as a schoolboy talent at Clongowes Wood College. He was captain of the Clongowes Wood College Senior Cup Team that won the Leinster Schools Cup in 1998. He played backrow and second-row for Leinster Rugby until he retired in 2007. He continued to play at amateur level for Blackrock College RFC in the AIL (All Ireland League), becoming the club's captain. He played 67 times in total for Leinster Rugby, scoring 4 tries.
