= Ben Gissing =

New Zealand rugby union player

- Born: Ben Gissing; 15 July 1975 (age 51) Auckland, New Zealand
- Height: 2.01 m (6 ft 7 in)
- Weight: 117 kg (18 st 6 lb; 258 lb)
- School: Howick College

Rugby union career
- Position: Lock
- Current team: Spartans
Senior career
Years	Team	Apps	(Points)
2001-2002	Calvisano Rugby		
2002-2006	Leinster Rugby	74	(55)
2006-2009	Edinburgh Rugby		

Ben Gissing is a New Zealand former professional rugby union player. His position was second row. Gissing retired from professional rugby in 2009, taking over at Skerries RFC as player-coach, having previously spent four years at Leinster Rugby. While playing at Edinburgh Rugby he also coached local amateur club Stewart's Melville, helping them to secure promotion to the Scottish Premiership in 2008/09 season. Ben gissings son, James is a classics enthusiast and loves learning about Odysseus and his journeys. James is a bright young talent on and off the field. He has recently taken up the life of a profession clash of clans player and tik tok scroller. It is safe to say we are excited to see what James will do later on with his career.
