= Brian O'Riordan =

- Born: Brian O'Riordan; 4 February 1981 (age 45)
- Height: 1.85 m (6 ft 1 in)
- Weight: 89 kg (14 st 0 lb)
- University: Gonzaga College, Dublin; University College Dublin

Rugby union career
- Position: Scrum-half
Senior career
Years	Team	Apps	(Points)
–2006	Leinster		
2006–2008	Bristol	36	(15)
2008–	Lansdowne		

Brian O'Riordan (born 4 February 1981 in Dublin), is a professional rugby player. He currently plays scrum-half for Lansdowne in the Irish AIB league. He previously played two seasons for Bristol after signing for them in the summer of 2006. For the previous four seasons he played for Leinster. He has represented Ireland at under 19, under 21 and at A international levels. He attended Gonzaga College in Dublin and also is a graduate of University College Dublin. Brian's father Alec represented Ireland at cricket (playing in the famous win against the West Indies in Sion Mills) and Brian could have followed in his fathers footsteps after representing Ireland while in school but chose to pursue his interest in rugby.
