= Eric Miller (rugby union) =

Irish rugby union player (born 1975)

- Born: Eric Roger Patrick Miller; 23 September 1975 (age 51) Dublin, Ireland
- Weight: 108 kg (17 st 0 lb; 238 lb)
- School: Wesley College
- University: Loughborough University; Sheffield Hallam University

Rugby union career
- Position: Number 8
Amateur team(s)
Years	Team	Apps	(Points)
1994–1996	Old Wesley		
1996–1998	Loughborough Students		
1998–2006	Terenure College		
Senior career
Years	Team	Apps	(Points)
1995–1996	Leinster		
1996–1998	Leicester Tigers		
1998–2000	Ulster		
2000–2006	Leinster		
International career
Years	Team	Apps	(Points)
1997–2005	Ireland	48	(30)
1997	British and Irish Lions	1	(0)
1998–2005	Barbarians	3	(5)

Eric Miller (born 23 September 1975) is an Irish former rugby union and Gaelic football player. As a rugby player Miller played for, among others Old Wesley, Leicester Tigers, Ulster, Leinster, the Barbarians, Ireland and the British and Irish Lions. After retiring as a rugby player, Miller switched football codes and went on to play Gaelic football for the Dublin county team.

== Early years ==
As a schoolboy and youth, Miller played several sports. He was educated at Wesley College where he played both rugby union and cricket. At the same time he played association football for Leicester Celtic, a team whose former players also included Damian Duff. He also played Gaelic football for Ballyboden St Enda's and, together with Brian Stynes, he helped them win a Dublin Under 21 Championship title in 1995. Miller eventually opted to concentrate on rugby union and spent the 1995–96 season playing for Old Wesley. He also represented Leinster for the first time at senior level.

== Leicester Tigers ==
In 1996 Miller joined Leicester Tigers and went on to make 12 appearances for them in the Heineken Cup. His impressive performances for the Tigers saw him make his debut for Ireland and then represent the British and Irish Lions. While playing for the Tigers, he also attended both Loughborough University, where he studied for a degree in physical education at Sheffield Hallam University.

== Leinster ==
Miller first played for Leinster during the 1995–96 season while still attached to Old Wesley. After his spell with Leicester Tigers he returned to Ireland and initially linked up with Terenure College RFC and Ulster. In 2000, he returned to Leinster and went on to make 148 appearances for the province in the Celtic League and the Heineken Cup. Back at Leinster he helped them win the 2001–02 Celtic League title.

== Rugby international ==
=== Ireland ===
As well as winning senior caps, Miller also represented Ireland at schoolboy, U21 and A levels. In 1996, he was a prominent member of the Ireland U21 team that won a Triple Crown for the first time. Between 1997 and 2005, Miller made 48 appearances and scored 30 points, including 6 tries, for Ireland. He made his international debut in a friendly against Italy on 4 January 1997. He went on to play for Ireland at both the 1999 and 2003 World Cups. He scored two of six his tries in one game against Namibia during the 2003 Rugby World Cup. He made his final appearance for Ireland in a friendly against Japan on 19 June 2005.

=== British and Irish Lions ===
After playing just four senior internationals for Ireland, Miller was selected by the British and Irish Lions for their 1997 tour of South Africa. He played in five games during the tour, lining up against the Border Bulldogs, Northern Transvaal, Natal and the Free State Cheetahs. A bout of flu saw him miss the first test against South Africa but he recovered in time to feature in the second test on 28 June 1997. However injury saw him miss the third test. At 21 he was youngest member of the touring party.

=== Barbarians ===
Miller has also played for the Barbarians several times. In May 2004 he was included in their squad for games against England, Wales and Scotland. On 25 May 2005 he featured in a 38–7 defeat against Scotland at Pittodrie.

== Return to Gaelic football ==
After retiring as a rugby player in January 2006, Miller started playing Gaelic football again. In August 2006 he came on as a substitute for Ballyboden St Enda's in a Dublin AFL Division 1 game against Thomas Davis. On 5 December 2006, he played his first senior game for the Dublin county team against Louth. He has since ended his short return to GAA.

Since finishing with Gaelic football, Miller set up his own personal training company called the real golf solution.

== Coaching ==
Miller has also had a successful coaching career. In September 2006 he undertook a coaching position in Wesley College, Dublin until 2009. He also coached for Old Wesley as well as Saint Gerard's School. In 2011, he was appointed Head Coach Blackrock College Rugby Club Dublin. From 2009 to 2012, Miller also served as Head and assistant coach to the Leinster U18 Club (youths) team and helped the team win three interprovincial championships in a row during his tenure.

In August 2012 Miller was appointed Head Coach of CYM Rugby Club in Terenure Dublin, following in the footsteps of club luminaries like Ray Fagan. In May 2013 Miller was appointed Head Coach of Seapoint Rugby Club, a Division 2A side in South Dublin playing in the All-Ireland League.

From August 2014 until May 2016, Miller served as the Director of Rugby for Trinity College Kandy, Sri Lanka.

Beginning in 2016, Miller coached the men's senior firsts team in the Wicklow-based Arklow Rugby Club, and the all boys private school Catholic University School on Lower Leeson Street in Dublin, until 2019 .

== Honours ==
Rugby union

Wesley College

- Leinster Schools Junior Cup
  - Runner-up: 1989–90 : 1

Leinster

- Celtic League
  - Winners: 2000–01 : 1

Gaelic football

Ballyboden St Enda's

- Dublin Under 21 Football Championship
  - Winners: 1995: 1
