= Brian Blaney =

Irish rugby union player

- Born: Brian Blaney; 26 February 1982 (age 44) Dublin
- Height: 6 ft 2 in (1.88 m)
- Weight: 105 kg (16 st 7 lb)
- School: Terenure College

Rugby union career
- Position: Hooker
Senior career
Years	Team	Apps	(Points)
	Leinster U21	8	
2003–09	Leinster	71	(25)
2010	London Irish		
International career
Years	Team	Apps	(Points)
	Ireland Schools	1	
2006	Ireland A	5	(0)

Brian Blaney (born 26 February 1982 in Dublin) is a professional rugby union player who played at Hooker for Leinster and now plays for London Irish.

== Early life and education ==
Blaney went to Terenure College in Dublin, which is one of the main rugby nurseries in Ireland. His brothers, David & James Blaney, are former Leinster rugby players. His cousin, Greg Blaney, won 2 All-Ireland Senior Football Championship medals with a famous exponent of Down in the 1991,'94.

== Playing career ==
He joined London Irish at the start of 2010/11 season. During his time at Leinster, Blaney made 71 Appearances and scored 5 tries. He won a Magners League medal 2007/08 season and European Cup medal 2008/09

== Honours ==
He won 5 caps playing for Ireland Wolfhounds (v France, USA, NZ Maori, England, Australia).
