= Kieran Lewis =

Irish rugby union player

- Born: Kieran Lewis; 19 August 1980 (age 46)
- Height: 1.85 m (6 ft 1 in)
- Weight: 90 kg (14 st 2 lb; 200 lb)

Rugby union career
- Position(s): Centre, Wing
Senior career
Years	Team	Apps	(Points)
2001-07	Leinster Rugby	63	(40)
2007-09	Munster Rugby	23	(10)
- Correct as of 10 Feb 2015
International career
Years	Team	Apps	(Points)
2005-08	Ireland A	10	(10)
2005-07	Ireland	3	(0)

Kieran Lewis born 10 June 1980 is an Irish former rugby union footballer for St Mary's Rugby Club. He previously played for both Munster and Leinster. He played at Centre. He is the current backs coach for St Mary's third XV.

He obtained 3 caps for Ireland.
