= David Blaney =

- Born: 3 March 1979 (age 47) Dublin, Ireland
- Height: 1.85 m (6 ft 1 in)
- Weight: 102 kg (16 st 1 lb)

Rugby union career
- Position: Hooker
Senior career
Years	Team	Apps	(Points)
1997–2006	Leinster	48	
2006–2010	Bristol Rugby	106	

David Blaney (born 3 March 1979, Ireland) is a rugby union player who played for Bristol Rugby in the Guinness Premiership. He plays as a hooker. He left Bristol at the end of the 2010–11 season.

Educated in Terenure College, Dublin, he was the winning captain of the 1997 Leinster Schools Rugby Senior Cup.
