= Donnybrook Stadium =

Rugby stadium in Dublin, Ireland

- Energia Park
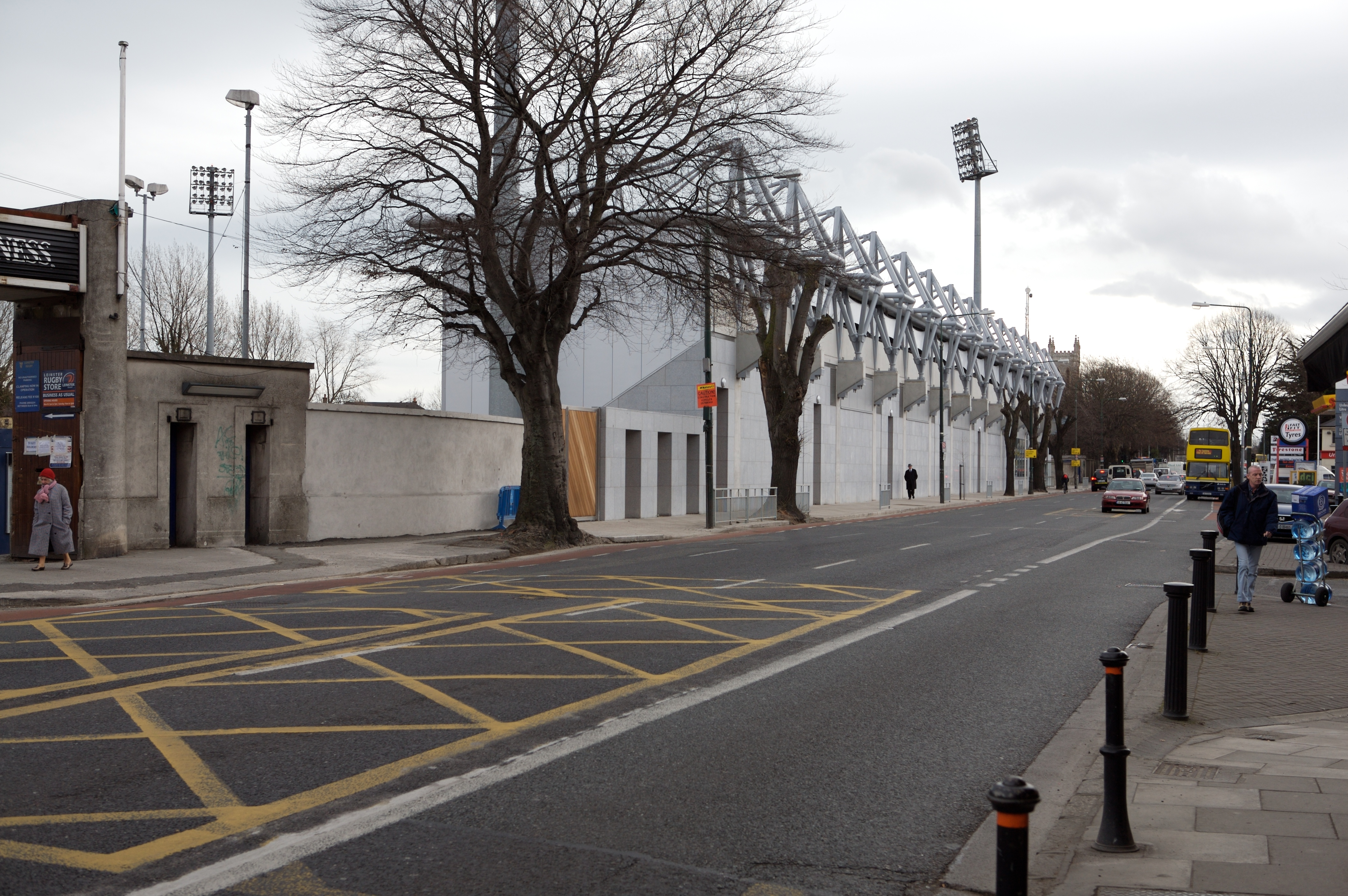
- The new grandstand, shortly after completion, in February 2008

- Location within Dublin
- Location: Donnybrook, Dublin
- Coordinates: 53°19′15″N 6°14′0″W
- Owner: Irish Rugby Football Union
- Capacity: 6,000
- Surface: Synthetic grass

Construction
- Opened: 1964
- Renovated: 2008

Tenants
- Bective Rangers RFC, Old Wesley RFC, Ireland Women (2016–present); Ireland national U20 rugby (2015–2018); Ireland A rugby (1993–2005); Leinster A Leinster (1964–2007)

Donnybrook Stadium, known for sponsorship reasons as Energia Park, is a rugby union stadium in Donnybrook, Dublin 4, Ireland. The stadium has a capacity of 6,000, including a 2,500 seat covered grandstand which was completed in early 2008.

== History ==
The stadium, also sometimes known as Donnybrook Rugby Ground, is located on the former fair green used for the Donnybrook Fair until the mid-1850s. Used for games by Bective Rangers and Old Wesley since at least the early 20th century, the ground was also the home stadium of Leinster Rugby - until they moved competitive games to the nearby RDS Arena in 2007.

In March 2018 Energia began a sponsorship deal, to rename the stadium as Energia Park for 10 years.

== Rugby union ==
Primarily used for rugby union, Old Wesley and Bective Rangers are two local clubs who play their home games in Donnybrook.

Leinster Rugby also still play some friendly games in Donnybrook, with Ireland A, Ireland Women's Team and Leinster underage sides playing home games in the stadium. Between 2015 and 2018, it hosted the Ireland under-20s home matches in the Six Nations Under 20s Championship. Since 2016, it has hosted the Ireland women's team's home matches in the Women's Six Nations Championship.

The stadium is also the principal venue for competitions organised by the Leinster Branch and competitions at all levels from under 13 to junior and senior adult level are played at the ground. This includes games in the Leinster Schools Senior and Junior Cups, and it hosts several games in each competition each year.

Ireland Uncapped International Matches
Date	Home	Score	Opponent	Competition	Attendance
19 March 1993	Ireland A	18–22	England A	Six Nations "A" Rugby Championship	
4 February 1994	Ireland A	10–20	Wales A	Six Nations "A" Rugby Championship	
20 January 1995	Ireland A	20–21	England A	Six Nations "A" Rugby Championship	
19 January 1996	Ireland A	26–19	Scotland A	Six Nations "A" Rugby Championship	
1 March 1996	Ireland A	25–11	Wales A	Six Nations "A" Rugby Championship	
13 November 1996	Ireland A	28–25	South Africa A	South Africa A tour of Great Britain and Ireland	
17 January 1997	Ireland A	23–44	France A	Six Nations "A" Rugby Championship	
14 February 1997	Ireland A	30–44	England A	Six Nations "A" Rugby Championship	
6 February 1998	Ireland A	9–11	Scotland A	Six Nations "A" Rugby Championship	
5 February 1999	Ireland A	26–25	France A	Six Nations "A" Rugby Championship	
5 March 1999	Ireland A	21–28	England A	Six Nations "A" Rugby Championship	
9 April 1999	Ireland A	73–17	Italy A	Six Nations "A" Rugby Championship	
18 February 2000	Ireland A	23–21	Scotland A	Six Nations "A" Rugby Championship	
3 March 2000	Ireland A	31–3	Italy A	Six Nations "A" Rugby Championship	
31 March 2000	Ireland A	28–26	Wales A	Six Nations "A" Rugby Championship	
8 November 2001	Ireland A	23–18	Samoa	2001 Samoa tour of Europe	
22 March 2002	Ireland A	59–5	Italy A	Six Nations "A" Rugby Championship	
28 March 2003	Ireland A	24–21	England A	Six Nations "A" Rugby Championship	6,000
11 March 2005	Ireland A	15–9	France A	Six Nations "A" Rugby Championship	
Up to date as of 19 November 2022.

Leinster Results versus Representative Sides
Date	Home	Score	Opponent	Competition	Attendance
30 December 1979	Leinster	26–10	Italy		
8 October 1980	Leinster	24–10	Romania		
12 November 1994	Leinster	9–6	United States	1994 United States rugby union tour of Ireland	
24 August 1999	Leinster	22–51	Argentina		
18 November 2022	Leinster	40–3	Chile	2022 end-of-year internationals	
Up to date as of 19 November 2022.

== Other uses ==
In August 2012 the stadium played host to two US high school American football teams, Jesuit Dallas and Loyola Academy of Wilmette, Illinois. Jesuit defeated Loyola 30–29 with a last minute game-winning field goal.

The stadium has also hosted music events. For example, it hosted a Michael Bublé concert in July 2008, and gigs headlined by The National and Future Islands in June 2018.

== Gallery ==
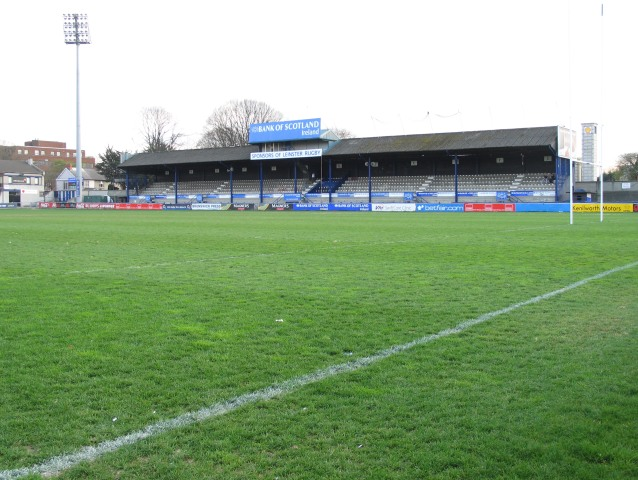
Grandstand prior to renovation

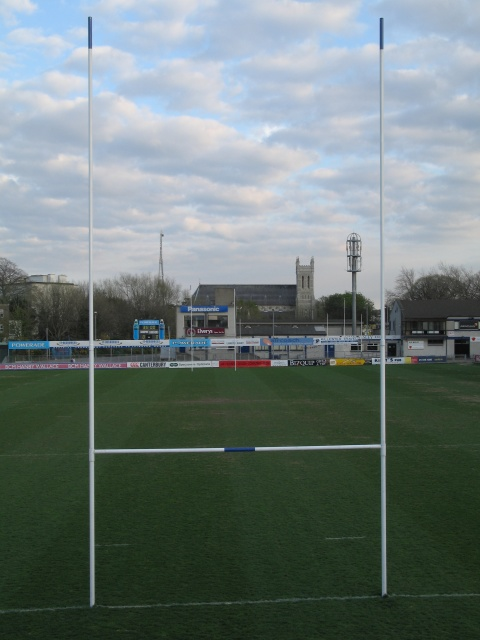
View from behind posts

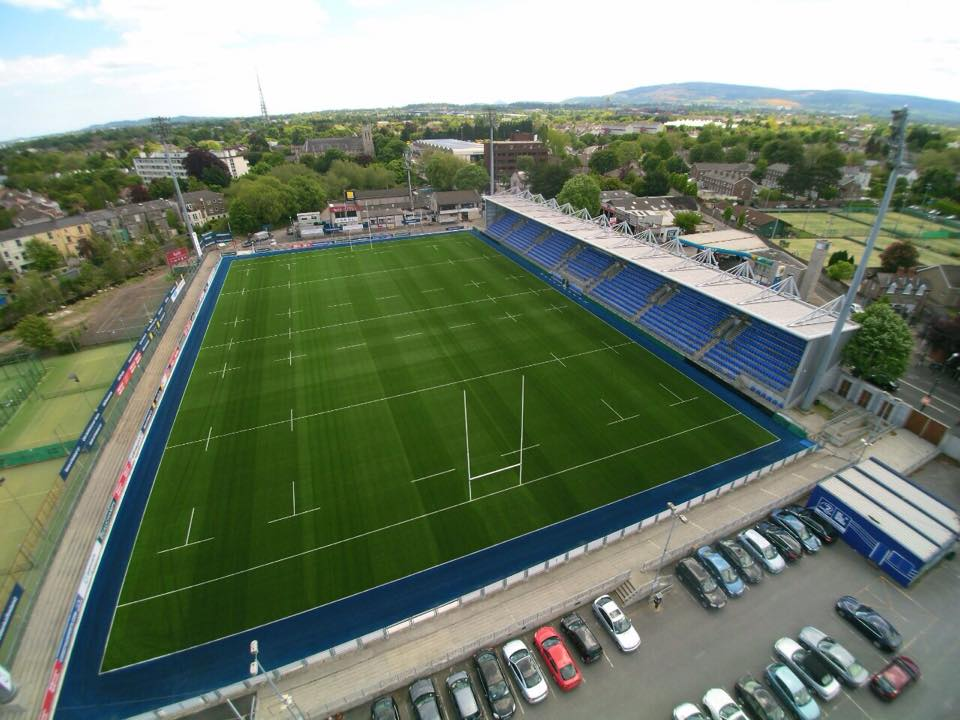
Aerial view after renovation
