= 2007–08 Ulster Rugby season =

Provincial professional playing season

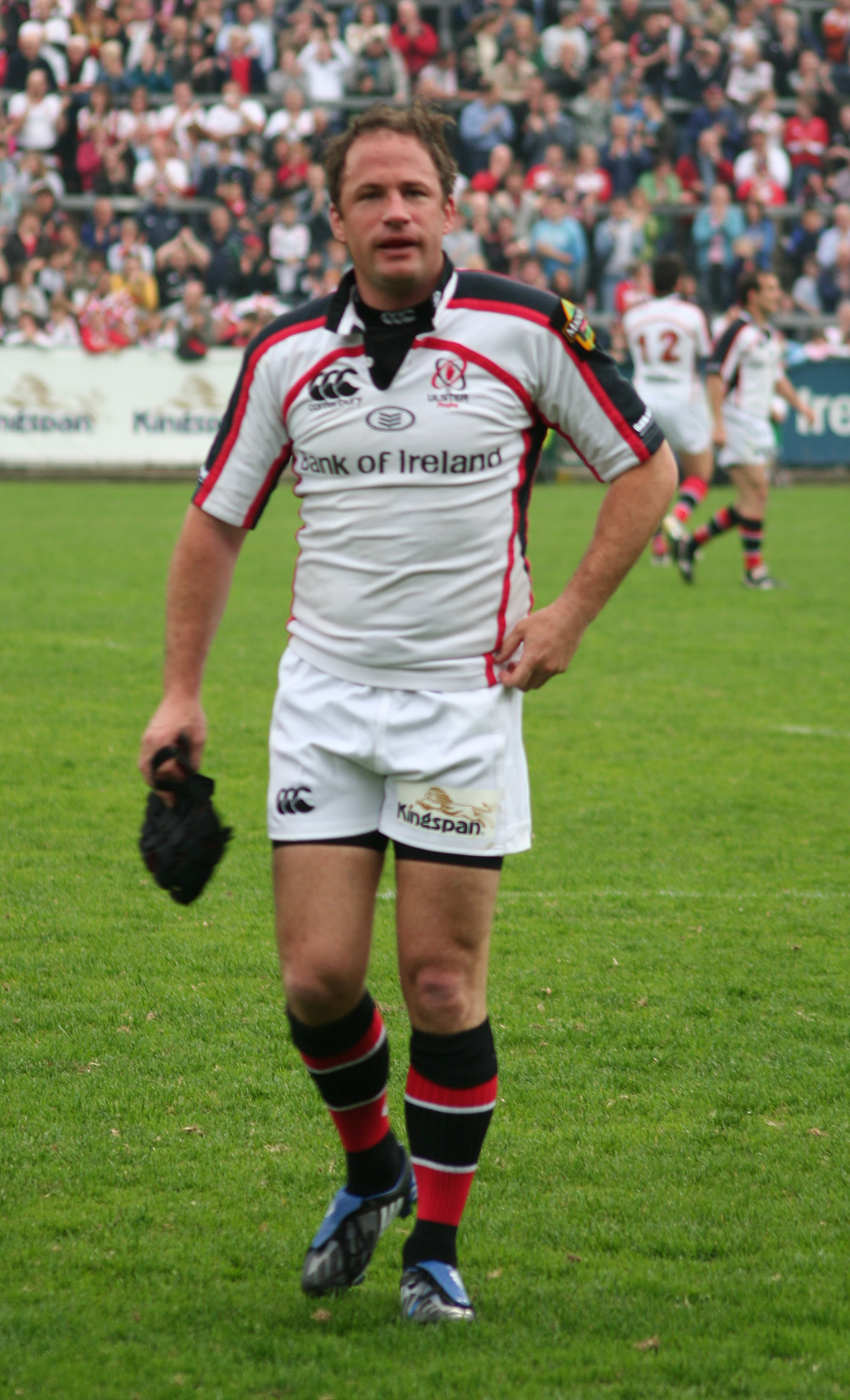
- David Humphreys vs Cardiff Blues, Ravenhill, 9 May 2008
- Ground: Ravenhill Stadium (Capacity: 12,500)
- Coach(es): Mark McCall; Steve Williams; Matt Williams
- Captain: Rory Best
- Top scorer: Paddy Wallace (79)
- Most tries: Tommy Bowe (8)
- League(s): Heineken Cup (4th in pool); Celtic League (9th)
1st kit	2nd kit

The 2007–08 Ulster Rugby season was Ulster's 14th season since the advent of professionalism in rugby union, and their fourth under head coach Mark McCall. They competed in the Heineken Cup and the Celtic League

Steve Williams joined as assistant coach at the beginning of the season, replacing Allen Clarke, who had left to become the manager of the IRFU's elite player programme. After a poor run of results, Mark McCall resigned as head coach in November 2007. Steve Williams took over on an interim basis, and Matt Williams was appointed as McCall's permanent replacement in December. Ulster finished bottom of their pool in the Heineken Cup, and second from bottom in the Celtic League. Tommy Bowe was Ulster's Player of the Year, and IRUPA Players' Player of the Year. David Humphreys, who retired at the end of the season, was inducted into the IRUPA Hall of Fame.

== Staff ==
Position	Name	Nationality
Head coach (to 13 Nov 2007)	Mark McCall	Ireland
Assistant coach (to 13 November 2007); Caretaker coach (13 Nov-30 Dec 2007)	Steve Williams	Wales
Head coach (from 30 Dec 2007)	Matt Williams	Australia
Assistant coach	Neil Kelly	England
Fitness coach	Philip Morrow	Ireland
Team physiotherapist	Gareth Robinson	Ireland
Fitness coach	Jonny Davis	Ireland
Team doctor	David Irwin	Ireland
Team Manager	David Millar	Ireland
Video analyst	Simon McGookin	Ireland

== Squad ==
=== Senior squad ===
==== Players in (Season 2007/2008) ====
- (Ireland) Jarlath Carey from (England) Rotherham Titans
- (Scotland) Simon Danielli from (Scotland) Border Reivers
- (Italy) Carlo Del Fava from (France) Bourgoin
- (Scotland) Rob Dewey from (Scotland) Edinburgh
- (Ireland) Kieran Hallett from (England) Bedford Blues
- (Ireland) Neil Hanna from (England) Rotherham Titans
- (Ireland) Seamus Mallon from (England) Northampton Saints
- (Wales) Matt Miles from (England) Pertemps Bees
- (New Zealand) Grant Webb from (Japan) Toyota Verblitz

==== Promoted from academy ====
- (Ireland) Darren Cave
- (Ireland) Niall O'Connor
- (Ireland) David Pollock

==== Players Out (Season 2007/2008) ====
- (Ireland) John Andress to (England) Exeter Chiefs
- (Australia) Sam Harding released
- (Ireland) Kevin Maggs to (England) Bristol Rugby
- (Ireland) Andy Maxwell to (Scotland) Edinburgh
- (Ireland) Paul Shields to (England) Northampton Saints
- (Ireland) Lewis Stevenson to (England) Exeter Chiefs
- (Ireland) Scott Young to (England) Doncaster Knights

Ulster Rugby squad
**Props**: (Ireland) **Justin Fitzpatrick** (21 apps, 16 starts); (Ireland) **Bryan Young** (21 apps, 15 starts); (Ireland) Tom Court (14 apps, 11 starts, 10 pts); (Ireland) Declan Fitzpatrick (12 apps, 6 starts); (Ireland) **Simon Best** (no apps); (Ireland) Jarlath Carey (no apps); (Ireland) Niall Conlon (no apps); **Hookers**: (Ireland) **Rory Best** (19 apps, 17 starts, 5 pts); (Ireland) Nigel Brady (13 apps, 7 starts); (Wales) Matt Miles (1 app); (Ireland) Stuart Philpott (1 app); (Ireland) Neil Hanna (no apps); **Locks**: (Ireland) **Matt McCullough** (22 apps, 19 starts, 15 pts); (Australia) **Justin Harrison** (21 apps, 16 starts); (Ireland) Ryan Caldwell (22 apps, 15 starts, 15 pts); (Italy) **Carlo Del Fava** (19 apps, 12 starts, 5 pts); (Ireland) Tim Barker (4 apps, 2 starts)	**Back row**: (Ireland) **Neil Best** (19 apps, 14 starts, 5 pts); (Ireland) **Kieron Dawson** (17 apps, 13 starts, 15 pts); (Ireland) **Roger Wilson** (15 apps, 10 starts, 10 pts); (Ireland) **Stephen Ferris** (10 apps, 10 starts); (Ireland) David Pollock (12 apps, 6 starts); (New Zealand) Grant Webb (4 apps, 2 starts); (Ireland) Neil McMillan (3 apps, 1 start); (Ireland) Chris Henry (no apps); **Scrum-halves**: (Ireland) **Isaac Boss** (20 apps, 17 starts, 20 pts); (Ireland) Paul Marshall (9 apps, 5 starts, 5 pts); (Ireland) **Kieran Campbell** (10 apps, 3 starts); **Fly-halves**: (England) Niall O'Connor (16 apps, 10 starts, 61 pts); (Ireland) **David Humphreys** (6 apps, 3 starts, 27 pts); (Ireland) Kieran Hallett (1 app)	**Centres**: (Ireland) **Andrew Trimble** (18 apps, 18 starts, 20 pts); (Ireland) **Paddy Wallace** (19 apps, 15 starts, 79 pts); (Scotland) **Rob Dewey** (14 apps, 9 starts, 5 pts); (New Zealand) **Paul Steinmetz** (8 apps, 7 starts); (Ireland) Seamus Mallon (4 apps, 3 starts); (Ireland) Darren Cave (2 apps, 1 start); (Australia) Adam Larkin (1 app); **Wings**: (Ireland) **Tommy Bowe** (23 apps, 23 starts, 40 pts); (Australia) **Mark Bartholomeusz** (19 apps, 15 starts, 5 pts); (Scotland) **Simon Danielli** (15 apps, 15 starts, 30 pts); (Ireland) Mark McCrea (13 apps, 10 starts); (Ireland) Paul McKenzie (no apps); **Fullbacks**: (Ireland) Bryn Cunningham (16 apps, 14 starts, 5 pts); (Ireland) Mark Kettyle (no apps)
(c) denotes the team captain, **Bold** denotes internationally capped players. Italics denotes academy players who appeared in the senior team.^{*} denotes players qualified to play for Ireland on residency or dual nationality. Players and their allocated positions from the Ulster Rugby website.

=== Academy squad ===
==== Players in ====
- (Ireland) Tommy Seymour
- (Ireland) James Sandford
- (Ireland) Ian Porter
- (Ireland) Chris Cochrane
- (Ireland) Jamie Smith
- (Ireland) Ian Whitten
- (Ireland) Paul Karayiannis
- (Ireland) Pat Steenkamp
- (Ireland) Sam McDonald
- (Ireland) Chris Quinn

==== Players out ====
- (Ireland) Michael Ferguson
- (Ireland) Phil Coulter
- (Ireland) Stuart Megaw
- (Ireland) Richard Fegan
- (Ireland) Dale Black

Academy squad
**Props**: (Ireland) Paul Karayiannis (1); (Ireland) Neil Simpson (2); (Ireland) Pat Steenkamp (1); **Hookers**: (Ireland) Stephen Douglas (2); **Locks**: (Ireland) Sam McDonald (1); (Ireland) James Sandford (1)	**Back row**: (Ireland) T. J. Anderson (2); (Ireland) Willie Faloon (2); (Ireland) Mark Robinson (2); **Scrum-halves**: (Ireland) David Drake (2); (Ireland) Ian Porter (1); **Fly-halves**: none	**Centres**: (Ireland) Ian Whitten (1); **Wings**: (Ireland) Chris Cochrane (1); (Ireland) Mark McCrea (2); (Ireland) Chris Quinn (1); (Ireland) Tommy Seymour (1); **Fullbacks**: (Ireland) Owen McMurray (2); (Ireland) Jamie Smith (1)

== Season record ==
Competition	Played	Won	Drawn	Lost	PF	PA	PD	TF	TA
2007-08 Heineken Cup	6	1	0	5	102	173	-71	13	24
2007-08 Celtic League	18	6	1	11	278	407	-129	33	41
Total	24	7	1	16	380	580	-200	46	65

== Heineken Cup ==
=== Pool 2 ===
Team	P	W	D	L	Tries for	Tries against	Try diff	Points for	Points against	Points diff	TB	LB	Pts
(England) Gloucester (3)	6	5	0	1	24	13	+11	184	119	+65	4	0	24
(Wales) Ospreys (8)	6	5	0	1	16	9	+7	164	102	+62	1	0	21
(France) Bourgoin	6	1	0	5	12	19	−7	118	174	−56	1	3	8
(Ireland) Ulster	6	1	0	5	13	24	−11	102	173	−71	0	1	5

9 November 2007	Ulster (Ireland)	14–32	(England) Gloucester	Ravenhill, Belfast
20:00	Tries: McCullough 29' c Wallace 40' c Con: Wallace (2)	Report; Match centre	Tries: Vainikolo 7' m Tindall 9' m Lamb 18' c Simpson-Daniel 22' m Balshaw 26' c Con: Lamb (2); Pen: Lamb 67'	Attendance: 13,000; Referee: Nigel Owens (Wales)
Ulster lineup: 1. Justin Fitzpatrick, 2. Rory Best, 3. Bryan Young, 4. Justin Harrison, 5. Carlo del Fava, 6. Matt McCullough, 7. Neil Best, 8. Roger Wilson, 9. Isaac Boss, 10. Paddy Wallace, 11. Mark McCrea, 12. Rob Dewey, 13. Andrew Trimble, 14. Tommy Bowe, 15. Bryn Cunningham.; Replacements: 16. Nigel Brady, 17. Declan Fitzpatrick, 18. Ryan Caldwell (for Del Fava), 19. Kieron Dawson (for Harrison), 20. Kieran Campbell (for Boss), 21. David Humphreys (for Dewey), 22. Mark Bartholomeusz (for Cunningham).				Attendance: 13,000; Referee: Nigel Owens (Wales)

16 November 2007	Bourgoin (France)	24–17	(Ireland) Ulster	Stade Pierre Rajon, Bourgoin-Jallieu
21:00	Tries: Tchougong 56' c Coux 64' m Con: Boyet; Pen: Boyet 15', 28', 39', 80+4'	Report; Match centre	Tries: Dawson 12' c Danielli 23' c Con: Wallace (2); Pen: Wallace 31'	Attendance: 6,000; Referee: Wayne Barnes (England)
Ulster lineup: 1. Justin Fitzpatrick, 2. Rory Best, 3. Bryan Young, 4. Carlo del Fava, 5. Matt McCullough, 6. Neil Best, 7. Kieron Dawson, 8. Roger Wilson, 9. Isaac Boss, 10. Paddy Wallace, 11. Simon Danielli, 12. Paul Steinmetz, 13. Andrew Trimble, 14. Tommy Bowe, 15. Mark Bartholomeusz.; Replacements: 16. Nigel Brady, 17. Declan Fitzpatrick, 18. Ryan Caldwell (for Del Fava), 19. David Pollock (for Dawson), 20. Kieran Campbell, 21. Niall O'Connor, 22. Rob Dewey.				Attendance: 6,000; Referee: Wayne Barnes (England)

7 December 2007	Ospreys (Wales)	48–17	(Ireland) Ulster	Liberty Stadium, Swansea
20:00	Tries: Parker 4' m Marshall 19' c A. W. Jones 44' c Tiatia 46' c Walker (2) 64' c, 80+3' c Byrne 72' m Con: Hook (5); Pen: Hook 12'	Report; Match centre	Tries: Boss 52' c Danielli 68' c Con: Wallace (2); Pen: Wallace 21'	Attendance: 8,082; Referee: Chris White (England)
Ulster lineup: 1. Justin Fitzpatrick, 2. Rory Best, 3. Bryan Young, 4. Justin Harrison, 5. Carlo del Fava, 6. Neil Best, 7. David Pollock, 8. Matt McCullough, 9. Isaac Boss, 10. Paddy Wallace, 11. Simon Danielli, 12. Paul Steinmetz, 13. Andrew Trimble, 14. Tommy Bowe, 15. Bryn Cunningham.; Replacements: 16. Matt Miles (for R. Best), 17. Declan Fitzpatrick (for J. Fitzpatrick), 18. Ryan Caldwell (for Harrison), 19. Kieron Dawson, 20. Kieran Campbell (for Boss), 21. Niall O'Connor (for Danielli), 22. Rob Dewey (for Steinmetz).				Attendance: 8,082; Referee: Chris White (England)

14 December 2007	Ulster (Ireland)	8–16	(Wales) Ospreys	Ravenhill, Belfast
20:00	Try: Danielli 38' m Pen: O'Connor 17'; Cards: Caldwell (yellow card) 55'; Del Fava (yellow card) 74'	Report; Match centre	Try: Marshall 54' c Con: Hook; Pen: Hook (3) 12', 15', 56'	Attendance: 9,665; Referee: Malcolm Changleng (Scotland)
Ulster lineup: 1. Bryan Young, 2. Rory Best, 3. Declan Fitzpatrick, 4. Justin Harrison, 5. Ryan Caldwell, 6. Neil Best, 7. Kieron Dawson, 8. Matt McCullough, 9. Kieran Campbell, 10. Niall O'Connor, 11. Simon Danielli, 12. Rob Dewey, 13. Andrew Trimble, 14. Tommy Bowe, 15. Bryn Cunningham.; Replacements: 16. Matt Miles, 17. Tom Court (for D. Fitzpatrick), 18. Carlo del Fava (for Harrison), 19. David Pollock (for Dawson), 20. Isaac Boss (for Campbell), 21. Paddy Wallace (for O'Connor), 22. Mark McCrea.				Attendance: 9,665; Referee: Malcolm Changleng (Scotland)

11 January 2008	Ulster (Ireland)	25–24	(France) Bourgoin	Ravenhill, Belfast
19:30	Try: Bowe 44' c Marshall 55' c Trimble 78' m Con: Humphreys (2); Pen: Humphreys (2) 6', 13'	Report; Match centre	Try: Coux 2' m Denos 20' m Vigneaux 40' c Petrilli 47' c Con: Parra (2); Cards: Jooste (yellow card) 53'; Monzeglio (yellow card) 66'; Frier (yellow card) 75'	Attendance: 8,340; Referee: James Jones (Wales)
Ulster lineup: 1. Justin Fitzpatrick, 2. Nigel Brady, 3. Declan Fitzpatrick, 4. Carlo del Fava, 5. Ryan Caldwell, 6. Matt McCullough, 7. Neil Best, 8. Grant Webb, 9. Paul Marshall, 10. David Humphreys, 11. Simon Danielli, 12. Paddy Wallace, 13. Andrew Trimble, 14. Tommy Bowe, 15. Bryn Cunningham.; Replacements: 16. Stuart Philpott, 17. Bryan Young (for J. Fitzpatrick), 18. Justin Harrison (for Caldwell), 19. David Pollock (for Webb), 20. Isaac Boss, 21. Niall O'Connor, 22. Mark McCrea.				Attendance: 8,340; Referee: James Jones (Wales)

20 January 2008	Gloucester (England)	29–21	(Ireland) Ulster	Kingsholm, Gloucester
13:00	Try: Qera (2) 7' c, 59' m Strokosch 34' c Balshaw 71' m Narraway 80' m Con: Paterson (2); Cards: Qera (yellow card) 80+2'	Report; Match centre	Try: Bowe (2) 21' c, 77' c Trimble 44' c Con: Wallace (2); O'Connor; Cards: McCrea (yellow card) 36'	Attendance: 12,480; Referee: Romain Poite (France)
Ulster lineup: 1. Bryan Young, 2. Rory Best, 3. Declan Fitzpatrick, 4. Justin Harrison, 5. Ryan Caldwell, 6. Matt McCullough, 7. Neil Best, 8. Grant Webb, 9. Isaac Boss, 10. Paddy Wallace, 11. Mark McCrea, 12. Paul Steinmetz, 13. Andrew Trimble, 14. Tommy Bowe, 15. Mark Bartholomeusz.; Replacements: 16. Nigel Brady (for R. Best), 17. Tom Court (for D. Fitzpatrick), 18. Carlo del Fava (for Harrison), 19. Neil McMillan (for Webb), 20. Kieran Campbell (for Boss), 21. Niall O'Connor (for Steinmetz), 22. Seamus Mallon (for Bartholomeusz).				Attendance: 12,480; Referee: Romain Poite (France)

== Celtic League ==
Team	Pld	W	D	L	PF	PA	PD	TF	TA	Try bonus	Losing bonus	Pts
(Ireland) Leinster	18	13	1	4	428	283	+145	44	30	4	3	61
(Wales) Cardiff Blues	18	12	0	6	395	315	+80	48	31	6	2	56
(Ireland) Munster	18	10	1	7	330	258	+72	33	26	2	4	48
(Scotland) Edinburgh	18	9	3	6	313	285	+28	35	29	3	3	48
(Scotland) Glasgow Warriors	18	10	1	7	340	349	−9	31	38	1	3	46
(Wales) Llanelli Scarlets	18	7	0	11	403	362	+41	45	38	6	5	39
(Wales) Ospreys	18	6	1	11	321	255	+66	24	24	2	9	37
(Wales) Newport Gwent Dragons	18	7	1	10	282	394	−112	31	44	1	3	34
(Ireland) Ulster	18	6	1	11	278	407	−129	33	41	2	1	29
(Ireland) Connacht	18	5	1	12	214	396	−182	16	39	0	2	24
Under the standard bonus point system, points are awarded as follows: 4 points for a win; 2 points for a draw; 1 bonus point for scoring 4 tries (or more) (Try bonus); 1 bonus point for losing by 7 points (or fewer) (Losing bonus)
Source: RaboDirect PRO12

21 September 2007	Ulster (Ireland)	17–16	(Wales) Ospreys	Ravenhill, Belfast
18:30	Try: Danielli; Pen: O'Connor (4)	Report	Try: Bishop; Con: Connor; Pen: Connor (3); Cards: James (yellow card)	Attendance: 8,142
Ulster lineup: 1. Justin Fitzpatrick, 2. Nigel Brady, 3. Tom Court, 4. Tim Barker, 5. Ryan Caldwell, 6. Matt McCullough, 7. Kieron Dawson, 8. Roger Wilson, 9. Kieran Campbell, 10. Niall O'Connor, 11. Simon Danielli, 12. Seamus Mallon, 13. Tommy Bowe, 14. Mark McCrea, 15. Mark Bartholomeusz.; Replacements: 16. Matt Miles, 17. Declan Fitzpatrick (for Court), 18. Justin Harrison (for Barker), 19. David Pollock (for Dawson), 20. Paul Marshall (for Campbell), 21. Adam Larkin, 22. Bryn Cunningham (for Mallon).				Attendance: 8,142

28 September 2007	Edinburgh (Scotland)	24–10	(Ireland) Ulster	Murrayfield, Edinburgh
19:30	Try: Turnbull; Houston; Con: Godman (2); Warnock; Pen: Warnock; Cards: Gissing (yellow card)	Report	Try: Bartholomeusz; Con: O'Connor; Pen: O'Connor; Cards: Caldwell (red card)	Attendance: 1,389
Ulster lineup: 1. Justin Fitzpatrick, 2. Nigel Brady, 3. Tom Court, 4. Justin Harrison, 5. Ryan Caldwell, 6. Matt McCullough, 7. David Pollock, 8. Roger Wilson, 9. Kieran Campbell, 10. Niall O'Connor, 11. Simon Danielli, 12. Seamus Mallon, 13. Tommy Bowe, 14. Mark McCrea, 15. Bryn Cunningham.; Replacements: 16. Matt Miles (for Brady), 17. Declan Fitzpatrick (for Court), 18. Tim Barker (for Caldwell), 19. Kieron Dawson (for McCullough), 20. Paul Marshall (for Campbell), 21. Adam Larkin (for O'Connor), 22. Mark Bartholomeusz (for Cunningham).				Attendance: 1,389

6 October 2007	Newport Gwent Dragons (Wales)	31–11	(Ireland) Ulster	Rodney Parade, Newport
17:30	Try: Wyatt; Charteris; Davies; Con: Sweeney (2); Pen: Sweeney (4)	Report	Try: Court; Pen: O'Connor (4); Cards: McCullough (yellow card); Pollock (yellow card)	Attendance: 4,139
Ulster lineup: 1. Justin Fitzpatrick, 2. Nigel Brady, 3. Declan Fitzpatrick, 4. Justin Harrison, 5. Tim Barker, 6. Matt McCullough, 7. David Pollock, 8. Roger Wilson, 9. Paul Marshall, 10. Niall O'Connor, 11. Simon Danielli, 12. Tommy Bowe, 13. Darren Cave, 14. Mark McCrea, 15. Mark Bartholomeusz.; Replacements: 16. Matt Miles (for Brady), 17. Tom Court (for D. Fitzpatrick), 18. Carlo del Fava (for Barker), 19. Neil McMillan (for Pollock), 20. Kieran Campbell (for Marshall), 21. Kieran Hallett (for O'Connor), 22. Bryn Cunningham (for Cave).				Attendance: 4,139

12 October 2007	Llanelli Scarlets (Wales)	32–8	(Ireland) Ulster	Stradey Park, Llanelli
19:10	Try: Watkins; Jones; Manu; Edwards; Con: Priestland (3); Pen: Priestland (2)	Report	Try: Bowe; Con: Wallace; Cards: McMillan (yellow card)	Attendance: 6,480
Ulster lineup: 1. Bryan Young, 2. Nigel Brady, 3. Tom Court, 4. Justin Harrison, 5. Carlo del Fava, 6. Matt McCullough, 7. Neil McMillan, 8. Stephen Ferris, 9. Isaac Boss, 10. Paddy Wallace, 11. Simon Danielli, 12. Seamus Mallon, 13. Tommy Bowe, 14. Mark Bartholomeusz, 15. Bryn Cunningham.; Replacements: 16. Rory Best (for Brady), 17. Justin Fitzpatrick (for Court), 18. Tim Barker (for Del Fava), 19. Roger Wilson (for Ferris), 20. Paul Marshall, 21. Niall O'Connor (for Mallon), 22. Mark McCrea (for Danielli).				Attendance: 6,480

26 October 2007	Ulster (Ireland)	16–16	(Ireland) Leinster	Ravenhill, Belfast
19:30	Try: Trimble; Con: Humphreys; Pen: Humphreys (2); Drop: Humphreys	Report	Try: D'Arcy; Con: Sexton; Pen: Sexton (3)	Attendance: 13,132
Ulster lineup: 1. Justin Fitzpatrick, 2. Rory Best, 3. Bryan Young, 4. Carlo del Fava, 5. Ryan Caldwell, 6. Neil Best, 7. Kieron Dawson, 8. Stephen Ferris, 9. Isaac Boss, 10. Paddy Wallace, 11. Mark McCrea, 12. Rob Dewey, 13. Andrew Trimble, 14. Tommy Bowe, 15. Bryn Cunningham.; Replacements: 16. Nigel Brady, 17. Declan Fitzpatrick (for Young), 18. Justin Harrison (for Del Fava), 19. Roger Wilson (for Dawson), 20. Paul Marshall, 21. David Humphreys (for Wallace), 22. Mark Bartholomeusz (for Cunningham).				Attendance: 13,132

2 November 2007	Glasgow Warriors (Scotland)	25–6	(Ireland) Ulster	Firhill Stadium, Glasgow
19:30	Try: Henderson; Con: Parks; Pen: Parks (6)	Report	Pen: Humphreys (2)	Attendance: 2,631
Ulster lineup: 1. Justin Fitzpatrick, 2. Rory Best, 3. Bryan Young, 4. Justin Harrison, 5. Ryan Caldwell, 6. Neil Best, 7. Kieron Dawson, 8. Stephen Ferris, 9. Isaac Boss, 10. David Humphreys, 11. Mark McCrea, 12. Rob Dewey, 13. Andrew Trimble, 14. Tommy Bowe, 15. Bryn Cunningham.; Replacements: 16. Stuart Philpott (for R. Best), 17. Declan Fitzpatrick (for Young), 18. Carlo del Fava (for Caldwell), 19. Roger Wilson (for Dawson), 20. Kieran Campbell (for Boss), 21. Paddy Wallace (for Cunningham), 22. Mark Bartholomeusz (for McCrea).				Attendance: 2,631

23 November 2007	Connacht (Ireland)	13–30	(Ireland) Ulster	The Sportsground, Galway
19:30	Try: Riordan; Con: Donnelly; Pen: Dunne; Donnelly	Report	Try: Dawson; Wilson; Del Fava; Con: Wallace (3); Pen: Wallace (3); Cards: N. Best (yellow card)	Attendance: 2,541
Ulster lineup: 1. Justin Fitzpatrick, 2. Rory Best, 3. Bryan Young, 4. Carlo del Fava, 5. Matt McCullough, 6. Neil Best, 7. Kieron Dawson, 8. Roger Wilson, 9. Isaac Boss, 10. Paddy Wallace, 11. Simon Danielli, 12. Paul Steinmetz, 13. Andrew Trimble, 14. Tommy Bowe, 15. Mark Bartholomeusz.; Replacements: 16. Nigel Brady, 17. Declan Fitzpatrick, 18. Ryan Caldwell (for McCullough), 19. David Pollock (for Dawson), 20. Kieran Campbell, 21. Niall O'Connor, 22. Rob Dewey (for Steinmetz).				Attendance: 2,541

30 November 2007	Ulster (Ireland)	14–20	(Scotland) Edinburgh	Ravenhill, Belfast
19:30	Try: Bowe; Pen: Wallace (3)	Report	Try: Dey; Cairns; Con: Godman (2); Pen: Godman (2)	Attendance: 9,750
Ulster lineup: 1. Justin Fitzpatrick, 2. Rory Best, 3. Bryan Young, 4. Carlo del Fava, 5. Matt McCullough, 6. Neil Best, 7. David Pollock, 8. Roger Wilson, 9. Isaac Boss, 10. Paddy Wallace, 11. Simon Danielli, 12. Rob Dewey, 13. Andrew Trimble, 14. Tommy Bowe, 15. Mark Bartholomeusz.; Replacements: 16. Nigel Brady, 17. Declan Fitzpatrick, 18. Ryan Caldwell (for McCullough), 19. Kieron Dawson (for Wilson), 20. Kieran Campbell (for Boss), 21. Niall O'Connor, 22. Paul Steinmetz (for Bartholomeusz).				Attendance: 9,750

26 December 2007	Leinster (Ireland)	29–0	(Ireland) Ulster	RDS Arena, Dublin
15:00	Try: Heaslip; Healy; Con: Contepomi (2); Pen: Contepomi (5)	Report	Cards: Boss (yellow card); N. Best (yellow card)	Attendance: 18,230
Ulster lineup: 1. Justin Fitzpatrick, 2. Rory Best, 3. Declan Fitzpatrick, 4. Justin Harrison, 5. Ryan Caldwell, 6. Neil Best, 7. Kieron Dawson, 8. Matt McCullough, 9. Isaac Boss, 10. Paddy Wallace, 11. Simon Danielli, 12. Paul Steinmetz, 13. Andrew Trimble, 14. Tommy Bowe, 15. Bryn Cunningham.; Replacements: 16. Nigel Brady (for R. Best), 17. Bryan Young (for D. Fitzpatrick), 18. Carlo del Fava (for Caldwell), 19. David Pollock (for Dawson), 20. Paul Marshall (for Boss), 21. David Humphreys (for Steinmetz), 22. Grant Webb (for Harrison).				Attendance: 18,230

15 February 2008	Ulster (Ireland)	38–13	(Wales) Newport Gwent Dragons	Ravenhill, Belfast
19:30	Try: R. Best; Cunningham; Danielli; Wallace; Boss; Caldwell; Con: O'Connor (4)	Report	Try: Dollman; Con: Thomas; Pen: Sweeney; Cards: Black (red card)	Attendance: 9,246
Ulster lineup: 1. Bryan Young, 2. Nigel Brady, 3. Declan Fitzpatrick, 4. Justin Harrison, 5. Ryan Caldwell, 6. Neil Best, 7. Kieron Dawson, 8. Stephen Ferris, 9. Isaac Boss, 10. Niall O'Connor, 11. Simon Danielli, 12. Paul Steinmetz, 13. Tommy Bowe, 14. Mark McCrea, 15. Bryn Cunningham.; Replacements: 16. Rory Best (for Brady), 17. Justin Fitzpatrick (for D. Fitzpatrick), 18. Carlo del Fava (for Harrison), 19. Matt McCullough (for N. Best), 20. Paul Marshall (for Boss), 21. Paddy Wallace (for O'Connor), 22. Seamus Mallon (for McCrea).				Attendance: 9,246

29 February 2008	Ulster (Ireland)	20–8	(Wales) Llanelli Scarlets	Ravenhill, Belfast
19:30	Try: McCullough; N. Best; Boss; Con: O'Connor; Pen: O'Connor	Report	Try: Priestland; Pen: Priestland	Attendance: 8,869
Ulster lineup: 1. Bryan Young, 2. Rory Best, 3. Tom Court, 4. Justin Harrison, 5. Ryan Caldwell, 6. Matt McCullough, 7. Kieron Dawson, 8. Stephen Ferris, 9. Isaac Boss, 10. Niall O'Connor, 11. Simon Danielli, 12. Paddy Wallace, 13. Paul Steinmetz, 14. Mark McCrea, 15. Mark Bartholomeusz.; Replacements: 16. Nigel Brady, 17. Justin Fitzpatrick (for Court), 18. Carlo del Fava (for Harrison), 19. Neil Best (for Dawson), 20. Paul Marshall, 21. Darren Cave (for Steinmetz), 22. Bryn Cunningham.				Attendance: 8,869

22 March 2008	Munster (Ireland)	42–6	(Ireland) Ulster	Musgrave Park, Cork
19:30	Try: O'Gara; O'Driscoll; Buckley; O'Leary; Howlett; Coughlan; Con: O'Gara (4); Warwick	Report	Pen: O'Connor (2); Cards: Court (yellow card)	Attendance: 7,500
Ulster lineup: 1. Justin Fitzpatrick, 2. Rory Best, 3. Tom Court, 4. Justin Harrison, 5. Ryan Caldwell, 6. Neil Best, 7. David Pollock, 8. Stephen Ferris, 9. Paul Marshall, 10. Niall O'Connor, 11. Mark Bartholomeusz, 12. Paddy Wallace, 13. Andrew Trimble, 14. Tommy Bowe, 15. Bryn Cunningham.; Replacements: 16. Nigel Brady (for R. Best), 17. Bryan Young (for J. Fitzpatrick), 18. Matt McCullough (for N. Best), 19. Roger Wilson (for Pollock), 20. Isaac Boss (for Marshall), 21. Rob Dewey (for O'Connor), 22. Mark McCrea (for Cunningham).				Attendance: 7,500

28 March 2008	Ospreys (Wales)	32–7	(Ireland) Ulster	Liberty Stadium, Swansea
19:10	Try: Williams (2); Walker; Hook; Con: Hook (3); Pen: Hook (2)	Report	Try: Dawson; Con: O'Connor; Cards: Court (yellow card)	Attendance: 9,087
Ulster lineup: 1. Bryan Young, 2. Rory Best, 3. Tom Court, 4. Justin Harrison, 5. Ryan Caldwell, 6. Matt McCullough, 7. Kieron Dawson, 8. Stephen Ferris, 9. Isaac Boss, 10. Niall O'Connor, 11. Mark Bartholomeusz, 12. Paddy Wallace, 13. Andrew Trimble, 14. Tommy Bowe, 15. Bryn Cunningham.; Replacements: 16. Nigel Brady (for R. Best), 17. Declan Fitzpatrick (for Young), 18. Grant Webb (for McCullough), 19. Roger Wilson (for Dawson), 20. Kieran Campbell, 21. Rob Dewey (for Wallace), 22. Mark McCrea (for Bartholomeusz).				Attendance: 9,087

11 April 2008	Ulster (Ireland)	18–6	(Ireland) Connacht	Ravenhill, Belfast
18:30	Try: McCullough; Court; Con: Wallace; Pen: Wallace; O'Connor; Cards: Ferris (yellow card)	Report	Pen: Dunne; Nathan; Cards: Morris (yellow card)	Attendance: 9,248
Ulster lineup: 1. Justin Fitzpatrick, 2. Rory Best, 3. Tom Court, 4. Justin Harrison, 5. Carlo del Fava, 6. Matt McCullough, 7. Kieron Dawson, 8. Stephen Ferris, 9. Isaac Boss, 10. Niall O'Connor, 11. Mark Bartholomeusz, 12. Paddy Wallace, 13. Andrew Trimble, 14. Tommy Bowe, 15. Bryn Cunningham.; Replacements: 16. Nigel Brady, 17. Bryan Young (for J. Fitzpatrick), 18. Ryan Caldwell (for Del Fava), 19. Neil Best (for Dawson), 20. Paul Marshall, 21. Rob Dewey (for O'Connor), 22. Mark McCrea.				Attendance: 9,248

19 April 2008	Cardiff Blues (Wales)	30–17	(Ireland) Ulster	Cardiff Arms Park
17:30	Try: Thomas; Williams; Roberts; Con: Blair (3); Pen: Blair (2); Flanagan	Report	Try: Bowe; Caldwell; Con: O'Connor (2); Pen: O'Connor; Cards: Caldwell (yellow card)	Attendance: 6,500
Ulster lineup: 1. Justin Fitzpatrick, 2. Nigel Brady, 3. Tom Court, 4. Carlo del Fava, 5. Ryan Caldwell, 6. Matt McCullough, 7. Kieron Dawson, 8. Roger Wilson, 9. Paul Marshall, 10. Niall O'Connor, 11. Mark Bartholomeusz, 12. Rob Dewey, 13. Andrew Trimble, 14. Tommy Bowe, 15. Mark McCrea.; Replacements: 16. Stuart Philpott, 17. Bryan Young (for J. Fitzpatrick), 18. Justin Harrison (for Caldwell), 19. Neil Best (for Dawson), 20. Isaac Boss (for Marshall), 21. Paul Steinmetz, 22. Darren Cave.				Attendance: 6,500

30 April 2008	Ulster (Ireland)	19–9	(Ireland) Munster	Ravenhill, Belfast
19:30	Try: Dewey; Trimble; Caldwell; Con: Wallace (2); Cards: Caldwell (yellow card)	Report	Pen: Warwick (3)	Attendance: 12,300
Ulster lineup: 1. Bryan Young, 2. Rory Best, 3. Tom Court, 4. Carlo del Fava, 5. Ryan Caldwell, 6. Matt McCullough, 7. Kieron Dawson, 8. Stephen Ferris, 9. Isaac Boss, 10. Paddy Wallace, 11. Mark Bartholomeusz, 12. Rob Dewey, 13. Andrew Trimble, 14. Tommy Bowe, 15. Bryn Cunningham.; Replacements: 16. Nigel Brady (for R. Best), 17. Justin Fitzpatrick (for Young), 18. Justin Harrison (for Caldwell), 19. Neil Best (for Ferris), 20. Paul Marshall, 21. Niall O'Connor (for Wallace), 22. Mark McCrea.				Attendance: 12,300

3 May 2008	Ulster (Ireland)	24–35	(Scotland) Glasgow Warriors	Ravenhill, Belfast
15:00	Try: Bowe; Danielli; Wilson; Boss; Con: Wallace (2)	Report	Try: Beattie; T. Evans; Fa'atau; M. Evans; Con: Parks (3); Pen: Parks (3); Cards: Low (yellow card); Barclay (yellow card)	Attendance: 6,592
Ulster lineup: 1. Justin Fitzpatrick, 2. Rory Best, 3. Tom Court, 4. Justin Harrison, 5. Carlo del Fava, 6. Matt McCullough, 7. Neil Best, 8. Roger Wilson, 9. Isaac Boss, 10. Paddy Wallace, 11. Simon Danielli, 12. Rob Dewey, 13. Andrew Trimble, 14. Tommy Bowe, 15. Mark Bartholomeusz.; Replacements: 16. Nigel Brady (for R. Best), 17. Bryan Young (for Court), 18. Ryan Caldwell (for Del Fava), 19. Kieron Dawson (for McCullough), 20. Kieran Campbell (for Boss), 21. Niall O'Connor (for Bartholomeusz), 22. Mark McCrea (for Danielli).				Attendance: 6,592

9 May 2008	Ulster (Ireland)	17–26	(Wales) Cardiff Blues	Ravenhill, Belfast
19:30	Try: Bowe; Danielli; Wallace; Con: Wallace	Report	Try: Molitika (2); Down; Davies; Con: Halfpenny (3)	Attendance: 9,672
Ulster lineup: 1. Bryan Young, 2. Rory Best, 3. Tom Court, 4. Justin Harrison, 5. Ryan Caldwell, 6. Stephen Ferris, 7. David Pollock, 8. Roger Wilson, 9. Isaac Boss, 10. David Humphreys, 11. Simon Danielli, 12. Rob Dewey, 13. Andrew Trimble, 14. Tommy Bowe, 15. Mark Bartholomeusz.; Replacements: 16. Nigel Brady (for R. Best), 17. Justin Fitzpatrick (for Young), 18. Matt McCullough (for Wilson), 19. Neil Best (for Pollock), 20. Paul Marshall (for Boss), 21. Paddy Wallace (for Humphreys), 22. Niall O'Connor (for Trimble).				Attendance: 9,672

== Home attendance ==
Domestic League					European Cup					Total	
League	Fixtures	Average Attendance	Highest	Lowest	League	Fixtures	Average Attendance	Highest	Lowest	Total Attendance	Average Attendance
2007–08 Celtic League	9	9,661	13,132	6,592	2007–08 Heineken Cup	3	10,335	13,000	8,340	117,956	9,830

== Friendlies ==
31 August 2007	Ulster (Ireland)	13-12	(England) Leeds Carnegie	Ravenhill, Belfast
	Try: McCrea; Con: Steinmetz; Pen: O'Connor (2)	Report	Pen: Di Bernardo (3); Drop: Di Bernardo
Ulster lineup: 1. Justin Fitzpatrick, 2. Nigel Brady, 3. Tom Court, 4. Ryan Caldwell, 5. Tim Barker, 6. Chris Henry, 7. Neil McMillan, 8. Roger Wilson, 9. Kieran Campbell, 10. Niall O'Connor, 11. Mark McCrea, 12. Paul Steinmetz, 13. Darren Cave, 14. Mark Kettyle, 15. Mark Bartholomeusz.; Replacements: Stuart Philpott (for Brady), Jarlath Carey (for Court 47'), Filo Paulo (for Barker 38-40'), Matt McCullough (for Henry 40'), David Pollock (for McMillan 40'), Adam Larkin (for O'Connor 61'), Seamus Mallon (for Cave 61'), Tommy Bowe (for Kettyle 47').

8 September 2007	Ulster (Ireland)	19-23	(England) Gloucester	Ravenhill, Belfast
	Try: O'Connor; Cunningham; Pen: Steinmetz (3)	Report	Try: Bailey; Buxton; Con: Walker; Lamb; Pen: Walker; Drop: Walker
Ulster lineup: 1. Justin Fitzpatrick, 2. Nigel Brady, 3. Tom Court, 4. Tim Barker, 5. Ryan Caldwell, 6. Matt McCullough, 7. David Pollock, 8. Roger Wilson (c), 9. Kieran Campbell, 10. Niall O'Connor, 11. Simon Danielli, 12. Paul Steinmetz, 13. Seamus Mallon, 14. Tommy Bowe, 15. Bryn Cunningham.; Replacements?

== Ulster Rugby Awards ==
The Ulster Rugby Awards ceremony was held on 15 May 2008 at the La Mon House Hotel outside Belfast. Winners were:

- Guinness Ulster Rugby Personality of the Year: David Humphreys
- Bank of Ireland Ulster Player of the Year: Tommy Bowe
- Vodafone Young Ulster Player of the Year: Niall O'Connor
- Kukri Sportswear Club of the Year: City of Armagh RFC
- First Trust Club Player of the Year: Ian Porter, QUB
- Ken Goodall Award for Outstanding Player at the Sports Institute: Ian Whitten, QUB
- Special Merit Award: Latimer Adair, Ballynahinch RFC
- Calor Gas Youth Player of the Year: James Simpson, Ballynahinch RFC
- Northern Bank Schools Player of the Year: Jonny Shiels, Coleraine Academical Institution
