= 2008 Ireland rugby union tour of New Zealand and Australia =

- Manager: Michael Bradley
- Tour captain: Brian O'Driscoll
- Top test point scorer: Dan Carter (11)
- Top test try scorer: 6 players tied with 1 try
Summary
P	W	D	L
Total
2	0	0	2
Test match
2	0	0	2
Opponent
P	W	D	L
New Zealand
1	0	0	1
Australia
1	0	0	1

Tour chronology
- ← Argentina 2007 Canada and USA 2009 →

The 2008 Ireland rugby union tour of New Zealand and Australia was a series of matches played in June 2008 in New Zealand and Australia by the Ireland national rugby union team.

== Matches ==
Saturday 7 June 2008

New Zealand	21–11	Ireland
Try: Sivivatu 14' m Nonu 61' c Con: Carter; Pen: Carter (3)	Report	Try: P. Wallace 21' m Pen: O'Gara (2)

Westpac Stadium, Wellington
Attendance: 33,743
Referee: (England) Chris White

Mils Muliaina	FB	15	FB	Rob Kearney
Anthony Tuitavake	W	14	W	Shane Horgan
Conrad Smith	C	13	C	Brian O'Driscoll (capt.)
Ma'a Nonu	C	12	C	Paddy Wallace
Sitiveni Sivivatu	W	11	W	Tommy Bowe
Dan Carter	FH	10	FH	Ronan O'Gara
Andy Ellis	SH	9	SH	Eoin Reddan
Jerome Kaino	N8	8	N8	Jamie Heaslip
(capt.) Richie McCaw	F	7	F	David Wallace
Rodney So'oialo	F	6	F	Denis Leamy
Ali Williams	L	5	L	Paul O'Connell
Brad Thorn	L	4	L	Donncha O'Callaghan
John Afoa	P	3	P	John Hayes
Andrew Hore	H	2	H	Jerry Flannery
Neemia Tialata	P	1	P	Marcus Horan
		Replacements
(substituted on) Keven Mealamu	H	16	H	Rory Best (substituted on)
(substituted on) John Schwalger	P	17	P	Tony Buckley (substituted on)
Anthony Boric		18		Mick O'Driscoll
(substituted on) Adam Thomson	F	19	N8	Shane Jennings (substituted on)
Jimmy Cowan		20	SH	Peter Stringer (substituted on)
Stephen Donald		21	FB	Geordan Murphy (substituted on)
(substituted on) Leon MacDonald	P	22		Girvan Dempsey
		Coaches
(New Zealand) Graham Henry				Declan Kidney (Ireland)

Saturday 14 June 2008

Australia	18–12	Ireland
Try: Barnes 6' m Horwill 21' c Con: Giteau; Pen: Giteau (2)	Report	Try: Leamy 15' c O'Driscoll 62' m Con: O'Gara

Telstra Dome, Melbourne
Attendance: 41,700
Referee: (France) Christophe Berdos

Cameron Shepherd	FB	15	FB	Rob Kearney
Peter Hynes	W	14	W	Shane Horgan (substituted off) 59'
(capt.) Stirling Mortlock	C	13	C	Brian O'Driscoll (capt.) (substituted off) 71'
Berrick Barnes	C	12	C	Paddy Wallace
Lote Tuqiri	W	11	W	Tommy Bowe
Matt Giteau	FH	10	FH	Ronan O'Gara
(substituted off) 78' Luke Burgess	SH	9	SH	Peter Stringer (substituted off) 51'
(substituted off) 75' Wycliff Palu	N8	8	N8	Jamie Heaslip
George Smith	F	7	F	Shane Jennings (substituted off) 25'
(substituted off) 70' Rocky Elsom	F	6	F	Denis Leamy
Nathan Sharpe	L	5	L	Paul O'Connell
James Horwill	L	4	L	Donncha O'Callaghan
(substituted off) 59' Matt Dunning	P	3	P	John Hayes (substituted off) 53'
(substituted off) 74' Stephen Moore	H	2	H	Rory Best (substituted off) 51'
Benn Robinson	P	1	P	Marcus Horan (substituted off) 74'
		Replacements
(substituted on) 74' Adam Freier	H	16	H	Jerry Flannery (substituted on) 51'
(substituted on) 59' Al Baxter	P	17	P	Tony Buckley (substituted on) 53'
(substituted on) 70' Dean Mumm	L	18		Mick O'Driscoll
(substituted on) 75' Phil Waugh	N8	19	F	Stephen Ferris (substituted on) 25'
(substituted on) 78' Sam Cordingley	SH	20	SH	Eoin Reddan (substituted on) 51'
Ryan Cross		21	W	Geordan Murphy (substituted on) 59'
(substituted on) Adam Ashley-Cooper		22	C	Girvan Dempsey (substituted on) 71'
		Coaches
(New Zealand) Robbie Deans				Declan Kidney (Ireland)

== Touring party ==
- Manager: Michael Bradley
- Captain: Brian O'Driscoll

=== Backs ===
- Isaac Boss (Ballymena RFC/Ulster)
- Tommy Bowe (Belfast Harlequins/Ulster)
- Girvan Dempsey (Terenure College RFC/Leinster)
- Ian Dowling (Shannon RFC/Munster)
- Gavin Duffy (Galwegians RFC/Connacht)
- Luke Fitzgerald (Blackrock College RFC/Leinster)
- Shane Horgan (Boyne RFC/Leinster)
- Rob Kearney (UCD/Leinster)
- Geordan Murphy (Leicester Tigers)
- Brian O'Driscoll (UCD/Leinster)
- Ronan O'Gara (Cork Constitution/Munster)
- Eoin Reddan (London Wasps)
- Peter Stringer (Shannon RFC/Munster)
- Paddy Wallace (Ballymena RFC/Ulster)

=== Forwards ===
- Rory Best (Belfast Harlequins/Ulster)
- Tony Buckley (Shannon RFC/Munster)
- Jerry Flannery (Shannon RFC/Munster)
- John Hayes (Bruff RFC/Munster)
- Jamie Heaslip (Clontarf RFC/Leinster)
- Bernard Jackman (Clontarf RFC/Leinster)
- Marcus Horan (Shannon RFC/Munster)
- Shane Jennings (St. Mary's College RFC/Leinster)
- Denis Leamy (Cork Constitution/Munster)
- Donncha O'Callaghan (Cork Constitution/Munster)
- Paul O'Connell (Young Munster/Munster)
- Mick O'Driscoll (Cork Constitution/Munster)
- Malcolm O'Kelly (St. Mary's College RFC/Leinster)
- Alan Quinlan (Shannon RFC/Munster)
- David Wallace (Garryowen/Munster)
- Bryan Young (Ballymena RFC/Ulster)

== See also ==
- History of rugby union matches between Australia and Ireland
- History of rugby union matches between Ireland and New Zealand
