= 2002–03 Heineken Cup pool stage =

- Season: 2002–03 Heineken Cup
- Date: 11 October 2002 – 19 January 2003

Qualifiers
- Seed 1: (Ireland) Leinster
- Seed 2: (England) Leicester Tigers
- Seed 3: (France) Toulouse
- Seed 4: (Wales) Llanelli
- Seed 5: (France) Perpignan
- Seed 6: (England) Northampton Saints
- Seed 7: (Ireland) Munster
- Seed 8: (France) Biarritz Olympique

The pool stage of the 2002–03 Heineken Cup.

== Pool 1 ==
Team	P	W	D	L	Tries for	Tries against	Try diff	Points for	Points against	Points diff	Pts
(England) Leicester Tigers	6	5	1	0	31	6	25	232	71	161	11
(Wales) Neath	6	2	1	3	18	12	6	151	139	12	5
(Italy) L'Amatori & Calvisano	6	2	0	4	10	34	−24	105	236	−131	4
(France) Béziers	6	2	0	4	8	15	−7	109	151	−42	4

11 October 2002
19:30

Neath (Wales)	16–16	(England) Leicester Tigers

The Gnoll
Attendance: 6,835

12 October 2002
14:30

Calvisano (Italy)	16–32	(France) Béziers

Centro Sportivo San Michele
Attendance: 1,100

19 October 2002
15:00

Leicester Tigers (England)	63–0	(Italy) Calvisano

Welford Road
Attendance: 14,525

19 October 2002
19:00

Béziers (France)	21–16	(Wales) Neath

Stade de la Mediterranee
Attendance: 6,000

7 December 2002
14:30

Calvisano (Italy)	38–29	(Wales) Neath

Centro Sportivo San Michele
Attendance: 2,500

8 December 2002
15:00

Béziers (France)	12–24	(England) Leicester Tigers

Stade de la Mediterranee
Attendance: 8,000

14 December 2002
14:30

Neath (Wales)	56–10	(Italy) Calvisano

The Gnoll
Attendance: 3,000

14 December 2002
14:45

Leicester Tigers (England)	53–10	(France) Béziers

Welford Road
Attendance: 15,444

11 January 2003
14:30

Calvisano (Italy)	22–40	(England) Leicester Tigers

Centro Sportivo San Michele
Attendance: 3,000

13 January 2003
18:45

Neath (Wales)	23–18	(France) Béziers

The Gnoll
Attendance: 3,000

18 January 2003
15:00

Leicester Tigers (England)	36–11	(Wales) Neath

Welford Road
Attendance: 16,845

18 January 2003
18:00

Béziers (France)	16–19	(Italy) Calvisano

Stade de la Mediterranee
Attendance: 800

== Pool 2 ==
Team	P	W	D	L	Tries for	Tries against	Try diff	Points for	Points against	Points diff	Pts
(France) Perpignan	6	4	0	2	23	16	7	176	156	20	8
(Ireland) Munster	6	4	0	2	27	14	13	206	107	99	8
(England) Gloucester	6	4	0	2	31	14	17	241	140	101	8
(Italy) Arix Viadana	6	0	0	6	15	52	−37	128	348	−220	0

12 October 2002
15:00

Gloucester (England)	35–16	(Ireland) Munster

Kingsholm
Attendance: 11,200

12 October 2002
19:30

Perpignan (France)	46–27	(Italy) Viadana

Stade Aime Giral
Attendance: 3,500

18 October 2002
20:45

Viadana (Italy)	28–80	(England) Gloucester

Stadio Luigi Zaffanella
Attendance: 2,000

19 October 2002
15:00

Munster (Ireland)	30–21	(France) Perpignan

Thomond Park
Attendance: 12,000

6 December 2002
19:30

Munster (Ireland)	64–0	(Italy) Viadana

Musgrave Park
Attendance: 6,500

8 December 2002
13:15

Gloucester (England)	33–16	(France) Perpignan

Kingsholm
Attendance: 8,112

14 December 2002
15:00

Perpignan (France)	31–23	(England) Gloucester

Stade Aime Giral
Attendance: 8,000

14 October 2002
18:00

Viadana (Italy)	22–25	(Ireland) Munster

Stadio Luigi Zaffanella
Attendance: 2,000

11 January 2003
15:00

Gloucester (England)	64–16	(Italy) Viadana

Kingsholm
Attendance: 8,271

11 January 2003
15:00

Perpignan (France)	23–8	(Ireland) Munster

Stade Aime Giral
Attendance: 8,000

18 January 2003
14:45

Munster (Ireland)	33–6	(England) Gloucester

Thomond Park
Attendance: 13,300

18 January 2003
15:00

Viadana (Italy)	35–39	(France) Perpignan

Stadio Luigi Zaffanella
Attendance: 1,000

== Pool 3 ==
Team	P	W	D	L	Tries for	Tries against	Try diff	Points for	Points against	Points diff	Pts
(Wales) Llanelli	6	5	0	1	22	16	6	201	130	71	10
(France) Bourgoin	6	4	0	2	21	14	7	190	142	48	8
(Scotland) Glasgow Rugby	6	2	0	4	9	23	−14	86	185	−99	4
(England) Sale Sharks	6	1	0	5	16	15	1	123	143	−20	2

11 October 2002
19:45

Sale Sharks (England)	18–24	(France) Bourgoin

Heywood Road
Attendance: 5,007

12 October 2002
14:30

Llanelli (Wales)	45–15	(Scotland) Glasgow

Stradey Park
Attendance: 5,784

18 October 2002
19:30

Bourgoin (France)	54–38	(Wales) Llanelli

Stade Pierre Rajon
Attendance: 8,300

18 October 2002
19:30

Glasgow (Scotland)	26–14	(England) Sale Sharks

Hughenden
Attendance: 5,283

6 December 2002
19:45

Sale Sharks (England)	19–30	(Wales) Llanelli

Heywood Road
Attendance: 5,700

8 December 2002
15:00

Bourgoin (France)	35–21	(Scotland) Glasgow

Stade Pierre Rajon
Attendance: 8,500

13 December 2002
19:30

Glasgow (Scotland)	13–12	(France) Bourgoin

Hughenden
Attendance: 2,867

13 December 2002
19:30

Llanelli (Wales)	17–12	(England) Sale Sharks

Stradey Park
Attendance: 7,182

10 January 2003
19:30

Llanelli (Wales)	37–22	(France) Bourgoin

Stradey Park
Attendance: 8,421

10 January 2003
19:45

Sale Sharks (England)	45–3	(Scotland) Glasgow Rugby

Heywood Road
Attendance: 3,967

17 January 2003
19:30

Glasgow (Scotland)	8–34	(Wales) Llanelli

Hughenden
Attendance: 3,207

18 January 2003
15:00

Burgoin (France)	43–15	(England) Sale Sharks

Stade Pierre Rajon
Attendance: 7,000

== Pool 4 ==
Team	P	W	D	L	Tries for	Tries against	Try diff	Points for	Points against	Points diff	Pts
(Ireland) Leinster	6	6	0	0	22	7	15	188	93	95	12
(England) Bristol Shoguns	6	3	0	3	15	17	−2	149	144	5	6
(France) Montferrand	6	2	0	4	15	8	7	141	120	21	4
(Wales) Swansea	6	1	0	5	8	28	−20	109	230	−121	2

11 October 2002
19:15

Leinster (Ireland)	29–23	(England) Bristol Shoguns

Donnybrook
Attendance: 6,000

12 October 2002
19:30

Montferrand (France)	47–12	(Wales) Swansea

Stade Marcel-Michelin
Attendance: 9,000

19 October 2002
15:00

Bristol Shoguns (England)	24–19	(France) Montferrand

Memorial Ground
Attendance: 4,607

19 October 2002
19:30

Swansea (Wales)	10–51	(Ireland) Leinster

St. Helen's
Attendance: 3,500

7 December 2002
14:30

Swansea (Wales)	26–19	(England) Bristol Shoguns

St. Helen's
Attendance: 3,200

7 December 2002
15:00

Montferrand (France)	20–23	(Ireland) Leinster

Stade Marcel-Michelin
Attendance: 10,000

13 December 2002
19:35

Leinster (Ireland)	12–9	(France) Montferrand

Donnybrook
Attendance: 7,500

15 December 2002
15:00

Bristol Shoguns (England)	41–23	(Wales) Swansea

Memorial Ground
Attendance: 4,327

10 January 2003
19:35

Leinster (Ireland)	48–19	(Wales) Swansea

Donnybrook
Attendance: 7,500

12 January 2003
15:00

Montferrand (France)	22–30	(England) Bristol Shoguns

Stade Marcel-Michelin
Attendance: 7,000

18 January 2003
15:00

Swansea (Wales)	19–24	(France) Montferrand

St. Helen's
Attendance: 3,000

19 January 2003
13:45

Bristol Shoguns (England)	12–25	(Ireland) Leinster

Memorial Ground
Attendance: 7,013

== Pool 5 ==
Team	P	W	D	L	Tries for	Tries against	Try diff	Points for	Points against	Points diff	Pts
(France) Toulouse	6	5	0	1	29	9	20	241	118	123	10
(England) London Irish	6	3	0	3	12	13	−1	158	118	40	6
(Scotland) Edinburgh Rugby	6	2	0	4	15	19	−4	125	188	−63	4
(Wales) Newport	6	2	0	4	11	26	−15	117	217	−100	4

11 October 2002
19:30

Edinburgh (Scotland)	27–17	(Wales) Newport

Meadowbank Stadium
Attendance: 4,358

12 October 2002
15:00

Toulouse (France)	28–23	(England) London Irish

Stade Ernest Wallon
Attendance: 8,000

18 October 2002
19:30

Newport (Wales)	19–34	(France) Toulouse

Rodney Parade
Attendance: 6,730

20 October 2002
15:00

London Irish (England)	24–8	(Scotland) Edinburgh

Madejski Stadium
Attendance: 6,606

6 December 2002
14:45

Edinburgh (Scotland)	9–30	(France) Toulouse

Meadowbank Stadium
Attendance: 4,372

7 December 2002
14:30

Newport (Wales)	16–12	(England) London Irish

Rodney Parade
Attendance: 6,435

14 December 2002
14:00

Toulouse (France)	50–17	(Scotland) Edinburgh

Stade Ernest Wallon
Attendance: 14,000

15 December 2002
15:00

London Irish (England)	42–5	(Wales) Newport

Madejski Stadium
Attendance: 7,102

10 January 2003
19:30

Edinburgh (Scotland)	32–25	(England) London Irish

Meadowbank Stadium
Attendance: 4,451

11 January 2003
15:00

Toulouse (France)	70–18	(Wales) Newport

Stade Ernest Wallon
Attendance: 8,000

18 January 2003
14:30

Newport (Wales)	42–32	(Scotland) Edinburgh

Rodney Parade
Attendance: 8,880

19 January 2003
13:45

London Irish (England)	32–29	(France) Toulouse

Madejski Stadium
Attendance: 9,297

== Pool 6 ==
Team	P	W	D	L	Tries for	Tries against	Try diff	Points for	Points against	Points diff	Pts
(England) Northampton Saints	6	4	0	2	21	10	11	172	110	62	8
(France) Biarritz Olympique	6	4	0	2	14	5	9	138	73	65	8
(Ireland) Ulster	6	4	0	2	8	8	0	116	106	10	8
(Wales) Cardiff	6	0	0	6	6	26	−20	78	215	−137	0

12 October 2002
17:30

Cardiff (Wales)	15–26	(France) Biarritz

Cardiff Arms Park
Attendance: 6,500

13 October 2002
16:30

Northampton Saints (England)	32 – 9	(Ireland) Ulster
Try: Dawson, Leslie; Con: Grayson (2); Pen: Grayson (5)	Report	Pen: Humphreys (2), Doak

Franklin's Gardens
Attendance: 9,481
Referee: A. Lambardi

18 October 2002
19:05

Ulster (Ireland)	25 – 6	(Wales) Cardiff
Try: Young; Con: Humphreys; Pen: Humphreys (5); Drop: Humphreys	Report	Pen: Harris (2)

Ravenhill
Attendance: 11,000

19 October 2002
15:00

Biarritz (France)	23–20	(England) Northampton Saints

Parc des Sports Aquil
Attendance: 5,500

6 December 2002
19:15

Ulster (Ireland)	13 – 9	(France) Biarritz
Try: Topping; Con: Humphreys; Pen: Humphreys (2)	Report	Pen: Yachvili (2); Drop: Peyrelongue

Ravenhill
Attendance: 11,650
Referee: Chris White

7 December 2002
15:00

Northampton Saints (England)	25–11	(Wales) Cardiff

Franklin's Gardens
Attendance: 10,000

14 December 2002
15:00

Biarritz (France)	25 – 20	(Ireland) Ulster
Try: Isaac, Couzinet, Cassin; Con: Yachvili (2); Pen: Yachvili (2)	Report	Try: J. Cunningham, Ward; Con: Doak (2); Pen: Doak (2)

Parc des Sports Aquil
Attendance: 8,000
Referee: D. Pearson

15 December 2002
13:30

Cardiff (Wales)	0–31	(England) Northampton Saints

Cardiff Arms Park
Attendance: 4,700

11 January 2003
14:45

Cardiff (Wales)	21 – 33	(Ireland) Ulster
Try: Walne, Allen; Con: Robinson; Pen: Robinson (3)	Report	Try: McMillan (2), penalty try Con: Humphreys (3); Pen: Humphreys (2); Drop: B. Cunningham

Cardiff Arms Park
Attendance: 4,000
Referee: R. Goodcliffe

11 January 2003
14:45

Northampton Saints (England)	17–14	(France) Biarritz

Franklin's Gardens
Attendance: 10,523

17 January 2003
19:05

Ulster (Ireland)	16 – 13	(England) Northampton Saints
Try: McMillan; Con: Humphreys; Pen: Doak; Drop: Humphreys (2)	Report	Try: Cohen; Con: Grayson; Pen: Grayson (2)

Ravenhill
Attendance: 12,500
Referee: Joel Dume

18 January 2003
15:00

Biarritz (France)	75–25	(Wales) Cardiff

Parc des Sports Aquil
Attendance: 4,000

== Seeding ==
Seed	Pool Winners	Pts	TF	+/−
1	(Ireland) Leinster	12	22	+95
2	(England) Leicester Tigers	11	31	+161
3	(France) Toulouse	10	29	+123
4	(Wales) Llanelli	10	22	+71
5	(France) Perpignan	8	31	+101
6	(England) Northampton Saints	8	21	+62
Seed	Pool Runners-up	Pts	TF	+/−
7	(Ireland) Munster	8	27	+99
8	(France) Biarritz Olympique	8	14	+65
–	(France) Bourgoin	8	21	+48
–	(England) Bristol Shoguns	6	15	+5
–	(England) London Irish	6	12	+40
–	(Wales) Neath	5	18	+12

== See also ==
- 2002-03 Heineken Cup
