= 2007 Ireland rugby union tour of Argentina =

Series of Irish Rugby Matches Played In Argentina

- Top point scorer: Felipe Contepomi (17)
- Top try scorer: Three players tied with 1
Summary
P	W	D	L
Total
2	0	0	2
Test match
2	0	0	2
Opponent
P	W	D	L
Argentina
2	0	0	2

Tour chronology
- ← New Zealand & Australia 2006 New Zealand & Australia 2008 →

The 2007 Ireland rugby union tour of Argentina was a series of matches played in June 2007 in Argentina by Ireland national rugby union team.

The Irish team, was very renewed, Eddie O'Sullivan tested many new players, and stars like Ronan O'Gara, Brian O'Driscoll remain at home, to rest before the starting of training for 2007 Rugby World Cup. In the first match, Irish lose a tight match, but had a bad defeat in the second.

== Touring party ==
Complete list of Ireland personnel:

- Manager: Eddie O'Sullivan
- Captain: Simon Best

=== Backs ===
- Isaac Boss (Ballymena RFC/Ulster)
- Tommy Bowe (Belfast Harlequins/Ulster)
- Brian Carney (Clonakilty/Munster)
- Gavin Duffy (Galwegians RFC/Connacht)
- Robert Kearney (UCD/Leinster)
- Kieran Lewis (St. Mary's College RFC/Leinster)
- Barry Murphy (UL Bohemians/Munster)
- Geordan Murphy (Leicester Tigers)
- Tomás O'Leary (Dolphin RFC/Munster)
- Eoin Reddan (London Wasps)
- Jeremy Staunton (London Wasps)
- Andrew Trimble (Ballymena RFC/Ulster)
- Paddy Wallace (Ballymena RFC/Ulster)

=== Forwards ===
- Neil Best (Belfast Harlequins/Ulster)
- Simon Best (Belfast Harlequins/Ulster)
- Peter Bracken (London Wasps)
- Tony Buckley (Shannon RFC/Munster)
- Leo Cullen (Leicester Tigers)
- Stephen Ferris (Dungannon RFC/Ulster)
- Jerry Flannery (Shannon RFC/Munster)
- Keith Gleeson (St. Mary's College RFC/Leinster)
- Jamie Heaslip (Clontarf RFC/Leinster)
- Trevor Hogan (Shannon RFC/Leinster)
- Bernard Jackman (Clontarf RFC/Leinster)
- Shane Jennings (Leicester Tigers)
- Mick O'Driscoll (Cork Constitution/Munster)
- Malcolm O'Kelly (St. Mary's College RFC/Leinster)
- Alan Quinlan (Shannon RFC/Munster)
- Frankie Sheahan (Cork Constitution/Munster)
- Bryan Young (Ballymena RFC/Ulster)

== Match details ==
=== First test ===
26 May 2007

Argentina	22–20	Ireland
Try: Senillosa; Con: F. Contepomi; Pen: F. Contepomi (4); Drop: F. Contepomi	Report	Tries: Carney c Penalty try c Con: Wallace (2); Pen: Wallace; Duffy

Estadio Brigadier General Estanislao López, Santa Fe
Attendance: 26,000
Referee: Lyndon Bray (New Zealand)

Team details

Argentina	Ireland

Bernardo Stortoni	FB	15	FB	Gavin Duffy
Tomás de Vedia	W	14	W	Brian Carney
Miguel Avramovic	C	13	C	Andrew Trimble
Hernán Senillosa	C	12	C	Kieran Lewis
Francisco Leonelli	W	11	W	Tommy Bowe
(capt.) Felipe Contepomi	FH	10	FH	Paddy Wallace
Nicolas Vergallo	SH	9	SH	Isaac Boss
Juan Manuel Leguizamón	N8	8	N8	Jamie Heaslip
Juan Martín Fernández Lobbe	F	7	F	Keith Gleeson
Martín Durand	F	6	F	Neil Best (yellow card)
(yellow card) Esteban Lozada	L	5	L	Malcolm O'Kelly
Pablo Bouza	L	4	L	Trevor Hogan
Santiago González Bonorino	P	3	P	Simon Best (capt.)
Alberto Vernet Basualdo	H	2	H	Jerry Flannery
Marcos Ayerza	P	1	P	Bryan Young
		Replacements
Matias Cortese		16	H	Bernard Jackman (substituted on)
(substituted on) Pablo Cardinali	P	17	P	Tony Buckley (substituted on)
James Diego Stuart		18	L	Mick O'Driscoll (substituted on)
(substituted on) Genaro Fessia	F	19	F	Stephen Ferris (substituted on)
Lucio López Fleming		20	SH	Tomás O'Leary (substituted on)
Juan Fernández Miranda		21	FB	Geordan Murphy (substituted on)
Horacio Agulla		22	W	Barry Murphy (substituted on)
		Coaches
(Argentina) Marcelo Loffreda				Eddie O'Sullivan (Ireland)

=== Second test ===
2 June 2007

Argentina	16–0	Ireland
Try: M. Contepomi; Con: Todeschini; Pen: Todeschini (3)	Report

Vélez Sarsfield, Buenos Aires
Attendance: 40,000
Referee: Kelvin Deaker (New Zealand)

Team details

Argentina	Ireland

Federico Serra Miras	FB	15	FB	Geordan Murphy
Tomás de Vedia	W	14	W	Brian Carney
Hernán Senillosa	C	13	C	Barry Murphy
Manuel Contepomi	C	12	C	Gavin Duffy
Francisco Leonelli	W	11	W	Rob Kearney
Federico Todeschini	FH	10	FH	Jeremy Staunton
Nicolas Vergallo	SH	9	SH	Eoin Reddan
Juan Manuel Leguizamón	N8	8	N8	Stephen Ferris
Juan Martín Fernández Lobbe	F	7	F	Shane Jennings
Martín Durand (c)	F	6	F	Alan Quinlan
Rimas Álvarez Kairelis	L	5	L	Mick O'Driscoll
Esteban Lozada	L	4	L	Leo Cullen
Santiago González Bonorino	P	3	P	Bryan Young
Pablo Gambarini	H	2	H	Frankie Sheahan
Marcos Ayerza	P	1	P	Simon Best (capt.)
		Replacements
(substituted on) Eusebio Guiñazú	P	16	H	Bernard Jackman (substituted on)
Pablo Henn		17	P	Tony Buckley (substituted on)
(substituted on) Pablo Bouza	L	18	L	Malcolm O'Kelly (substituted on)
(substituted on) Martín Schusterman	F	19	N8	Neil Best (substituted on)
Nicolás Fernández Miranda		20		Isaac Boss
Juan Fernández Miranda		21	C	Kieran Lewis (substituted on)
Horacio Agulla		22	FB	Luke Fitzgerald (substituted on)
		Coaches
(Argentina) Marcelo Loffreda				Eddie O'Sullivan (Ireland)
