= Boherbue Comprehensive School =

- Bóthar Buí

Location
- Boherbue; Cork, P51 TK28; Ireland
- Coordinates: 52.1591°N 9.0624°W

Information
- Founded: 1973
- Enrollment: 518 (2024)
- Website: boherbuecs.com

Boherbue Comprehensive School is a secondary school in Boherbue, County Cork, Ireland.

== History ==
This school was opened in 1973 as a co-educational, non-selective post-primary school. The term 'comprehensive' was current at that time and the curriculum of the school combined what were formally regarded as the 'secondary' subjects with the 'technical' subjects.

== Sport ==
Gaelic football is the most popular sport within the school and it competes in the All-Ireland Vocational Schools Championship. In 1992, the school were runners-up in the All-Ireland Senior Vocational School Championship and in 1998 it won the All-Ireland Junior Vocational School Championship. In 2001, the school won the All Ireland Ladies Senior Football Vocational Championship. Sports such as basketball and hurling are also played at the school.

== Past pupils ==
- Tony Buckley (born 1980) - former Munster Rugby, Sale Sharks and Irish Rugby International
- Michael Moynihan (born 1968) - Fianna Fáil politician and TD for Cork North-West
- Donncha O'Connor (born 1981) - Cork senior inter-county GAA player
