= All-Ireland Vocational Schools Championship =

Gaelic Athletic Association competition

The All-Ireland Vocational Schools Championship was a Gaelic Athletic Association football and hurling competition. There are two levels of competition. Individual schools compete for county, provincial and All-Ireland competitions. County teams selected from schools within each county also competed for provincial and All-Ireland competitions. The final intercounty championships in both codes were played in 2012, while the last schools championships were played in 2013.

== Intercounty Championship ==
=== Football Roll of Honour ===
Year	Winner	Opponent
2012	Cork 0–13	Kildare 0–12
2011	Donegal 1–11	Cork 0–11
2010	Cork 3-08	Monaghan 2-07
2009	Monaghan	Galway
2008	Cork	Monaghan
2007	Tyrone	Meath
2006	Wicklow	Tyrone
2005	Tyrone	Cork
2004	Tyrone	Longford
2003	Longford	Galway
2002	Donegal	Kerry
2001	Monaghan	Offaly
2000	Dublin	Tyrone
1999	Mayo	Tyrone
1998	Tyrone	Offaly
1997	Kerry	Tyrone
1996	Donegal	Kerry
1995	Donegal	Leitrim
1994	Cork	Donegal
1993	Kerry	Wicklow
1992	Kerry 4–15	Offaly 1-05
1991	Cork 2–13	Galway 1-06
1990	Kerry 0–11	Cavan 0-07
1989	Tyrone 0–13	Mayo 1-06
1988	Tyrone 1-09	Mayo 1-04
1987	Kerry 2–13	Donegal 2-09
1986	Kerry 2-07	Offaly 1-04
1985	Donegal 3-08	Cork 1-04
1984	Donegal 3-09	Longford 2-03
1983	Wicklow 0-08	Clare 0-04
1982	Mayo 1-09	Kerry 2-04
1981	Derry 1–11	Cork 2-06
1980	Derry 2-08	Wicklow 0-06
1979	Derry 2-03, 1-05 (R)	Mayo 0-09, 0-06 (R)
1978	Kerry 0–12	Mayo 1-07
1977	Kerry 1-09	Kildare 0–11
1976	Galway 4-09	Longford 2-09
1975	Mayo 1–15	Tyrone 0–11
1974	Wicklow 2-07	Tyrone 1-07
1973	Kerry 3-08	Mayo 2-06
1972	Carlow 3-09	Leitrim 1-05
1971	Mayo 2-04	Antrim 0-09
1970	Tyrone 2-06	Clare 1-07
1969	Tyrone 0-08	Dublin 1-04
1968	Antrim 6-07	Galway 1-04
1967	Tyrone 2-06	Kerry 1-07
1966	Fermanagh 5–11	Kerry 5-03
1965	Galway 1-09	Kerry 1-04
1964	Galway 0-07	Offaly 0-04
1963	Dublin City 4-08	Sligo 0-05
1962	Dublin City 3-06	Sligo 1-01
1961	Cork City 7-05	Offaly 3-08

=== Hurling Roll of Honour ===
Year	Winner	Opponent
2012	Galway	Kilkenny
2011	Tipperary 2–14	Kilkenny 1–16
2010	Tipperary	Kilkenny
2009	Cork	Offaly
2008	Cork	Galway
2007	Cork	Galway
2006	Cork	Tipperary
2005	Cork	Tipperary
2004	Tipperary	Offaly
2003	Galway	Tipperary
2002	Galway	Tipperary
2001	Galway	Cork
2000	Cork	Galway
1999	Galway	Tipperary
1998	Cork	Galway
1997	Cork	Galway
1996	Cork	Galway
1995	Galway	Cork
1994	Galway 2–10	Tipperary 1-05
1993	Galway 5–7	Tipperary 1–10
1992	Galway 3–13	Kilkenny 0–10
1991	Kilkenny 2–10	Offaly 2-07
1990	Tipperary 2–10	Kilkenny 0–11
1989	Kilkenny 3–11	Offaly 1–14
1988	Tipperary 5-03	Kilkenny 2-09
1987	Galway 5-07	Offaly 1-02
1986	Galway 3–12	North Tipperary 2-08
1985	Galway 3-08	Offaly 1-02
1984	Galway 4-99	Offaly 4-02
1983	Galway 2-08, 2-10 (R)	Kilkenny 2-08, 3-05 (R)
1982	Galway 4-07	Offaly 1-08
1981	Galway 1–11	Offaly 1-05
1980	Galway 3-08	Down 2-07
1979	Clare 1-08, 4-05 (R)	Kilkenny 1-08, 1-08 (R)
1978	North Tipperary 1-07, 8-11 (R)	Kilkenny 1-07, 8-09 (R)
1977	Kilkenny 2–12	North Tipperary 1–10
1976	Kilkenny 1–15	Galway 1–10
1975	Kilkenny 3-08	North Tipperary 2-06
1974	North Tipperary 4–13	Offaly 3-04
1973	Kilkenny 3–11	North Tipperary 1-08
1972	Kilkenny 3-09	Cork 3-07
1971	Antrim 7–14	North Tipperary 5-04
1970	Cork County 3-06	Offaly 1-05
1969	North Tipperary 8-05	Offaly 3-02
1968	North Tipperary 7–15	Antrim 4-02
1967	North Tipperary 4-08	Offaly 3-06
1966	North Tipperary 5–11	Wexford 5-03
1965	North Tipperary 8-09	Kilkenny 2-04
1964	North Tipperary 5–11	Down 5-03
1963	Kilkenny 12–03	Cork City 3-04
1962	North Tipperary 6–11	Kilkenny 0-03
1961	Limerick City 10–06	Kilkenny 7-09

== Individual Schools Championships ==
=== Senior Football Roll of Honour ===
Year	Winner	Opponent
2013	Cnoc Mhuire, Granard 2–13	Holy Trinity College, Cookstown 2–12
2012	Holy Trinity College, Cookstown 2–18	Gallen CS, Ferbane 0-07
2011	Gallen CS, Ferbane 2–11	Clonakilty CC 1-08
2010	Clonakilty CC 0–11	St. Malachy's, Castlewellan 0-08
2009	St. Malachy's, Castlewellan 0–15	Ashbourne CS 0-07
2008	St. Malachy's, Castlewellan 1–12	St. Brogan's, Bandon 0-05
2007	Virginia VS	St. Oliver's, Drogheda
2006	Virginia VS	St. Brogan's, Bandon
2005	St. Ciaran's HS, Ballygawley	St. Brendan's, Belmullet
2004	St. Brogan's, Bandon	Ferbane Schools
2003	Causeway Comprehensive	Holy Trinity College, Cookstown
2002	St. Ciaran's HS, Ballygawley	St. Brendan's, Belmullet
2001	Ars Scoil Chiarain, Clara	Causeway Comprehensive
2000	Caherciveen P.P.S.	Davitt College, Castlebar
1999	Caherciveen P.P.S.	Holy Trinity College, Cookstown
1998	Holy Trinity College, Cookstown	Davitt College, Castlebar
1997	Scoil Ui Chonaill, Caherciveen	St, Malachy's, Castlewellan
1996	Fermanagh CFE	Rathmore Post Primary
1995	st marks warrenpoint	
1994	Beara CS	Davitt College, Castlebar
1993	Rathmore CS	Athlone CS
1992	Tullow Community School	Boherbue Comprehensive School
1991	Tralee CC	Dungannon FE College
1990	Dungannon FE College	Moneenageisha
1989	Dungannon FE College 1-09	Tullow Community School 1-04
1988	Colaiste Gobnait 0–13	Dungannon FE College 0-08
1987	Rathmore CC 2-06	Moneenageisha 2-04
1986	Newry Tech 2-08	St. David's, Greystones 1-07
1985	Edenderry 2-04 2-08 (R)	Tuam 1-07 1-01 (R)
1984	Armagh FE College 2–13	Carlow 1-03
1983	Newry 5–12	Tuam 0-02
1982	Newry 1-06	Tullow Community School 2-02
1981	Newry 4-08	Moneenageisha 1-05
1980	Tralee 1-08	La Salle, Belfast 0–10
1979	St. Pius X, Magherafelt 1–14	Tuam 2-08
1978	Rathmore Post Primary 1-06	Newry 0-03
1977	Newry 3–14	Achill 1-05
1976	Newry 2-06, 1-10 (R)	Rathmore 2-06, 1-06 (R)
1975	Tralee 1-09	Virginia VS 1-06

- Colaiste Na Sceilge, Caherciveen are the only school to have won the two All-Ireland senior "A" secondary school competitions available, the vocational schools "A" championship (2000) and the Hogan Cup (2009)

=== Senior Hurling Roll of Honour ===
Year	Winner	Opponent
2013	St. Fergal's, Rathdowney 2–10	St. Brigid's, Loughrea 0–13
2012	Not Played	
2011	St. Brigid's, Loughrea 4–14	Roscrea CS 4–12
2010	Banagher College 3–17	Causeway Comprehensive 2-09
2009	St. Brigid's, Loughrea 3–18	Roscrea CS 1–14
2008	Colaiste Mhuire, Johnstown 2-09	Borrisokane 3-04
2007	St. Brigid's, Loughrea 4–10	Colaiste Mhuire 3-08
2006	St. Fergal's, Rathdowney	St. Brogan's, Bandon
2005	Borrisokane 2-09	Scoil Mhuire, Johnstown 0-08
2004	St. Brogan's, Bandon 3–15	St. Brigid's, Loughrea 2-07
2003	St. Brigid's, Loughrea 1–13	Scoil Ruain, Killenaule 0–12
2002	St. Brigid's, Loughrea 3-08	Athenry 0–11
2001	St. Brigid's, Loughrea 2–10	Causeway Comprehensive 1–12
2000	St. Brigid's, Loughrea 0-23	Johnstown 2-04
1999	Athenry 2–12	Johnstown 1-04
1998	Athenry 1–13	Roscrea 0-04
1997	Mannix College, Charleville 2–13	Athenry 0-09
1996	St. Brigid's, Loughrea 5–18	Mooncoin 0-06
1995	St. Brigid's, Loughrea 4–15	Roscrea 0-06
1994	Athenry 0–13	St Fergal's Rathdowney 0–12
1993	Athenry 1–18	Kilcormac 1-09
1992	Athenry 3-09	Bandon 2-07
1991	Roscrea 1–13	Moneenageisha 1-09
1990	Moneenageisha 1–13	Banagher 3–15
1989	Banagher 1–12	Roscrea 2-06
1988	Moneenageisha 1–10	Banagher 0–12
1987	Thomastown 3–12	Borrisokane 1-05
1986	Banagher 3-08	Borrisokane 1-05
1985	Banagher 2-05	Loughrea 0-08
1984	Nenagh 4-06	Enniscorthy 2-03
1983	Portumna 2–19	Johnstown 2-09
1982	Johnstown 3-07	Bandon 2-03
1981	New Inn 4-07	Ennis 2-06
1980	Roscrea 3-06	Banagher 0-06
1979	Ennis 2-05	Banagher 0-05
1978	Gort 5-05	Enniscorthy 3-05

- 1990 Moneenageisha awarded match after objection

The following is a list of the top teams by number of wins:

	Team	Wins
1	St. Brigid's, Loughrea	9
2	Athenry	5
3	Banagher	3
4	Roscrea	2
	Moneenageisha	2
5	Banagher College	1
	Colaiste Mhuire, Johnstown	1
	St. Fergal's, Rathdowney	2
	Borrisokane	1
	Mannix College, Charleville	1
	Thomastown	1
	Nenagh	1
	Portumna	1
	Johnstown	1
	New Inn	1
	Ennis	1
	Gort	1
	St. Brogan's, Bandon	1

=== Junior Football Roll of Honour ===
Year	Winner	Opponent
2013	Gallen CS, Ferbane 3–11	St. Mark's, Warrenpoint 2-04
2012	Cnoc Mhuire, Granard 1-06	Boherbue Comprehensive 0-08
2011	Cnoc Mhuire, Granard 1-06	Davitt College, Castlebar 0-08
2010	Holy Trinity College, Cookstown 0–13	St. Brogan's, Bandon 1-05
2009	St Paul's, Kilrea	
2008	Athenry	Dunshaughlin
2007	St. Columban's, Kilkeel	Bridgetown VS, Wexford
2006	St. Malachy's, Castlewellan	PS Sliabh Luchra, Rathmore
2005	Athlone CC	Clonakilty CC
2004	Athlone CC	St. Paul's, Armagh
2003	St. Ciarans HS, Ballygawley	Tullow Community School
2002	St. Ciarans HS, Ballygawley	St. Luachras, Rathmore
2001	Coalisland	Drogheda
2000	Caherciveen P.P.S.	Coalisland
1999	Ard Scoil Chiarain, Clara	Coachford College
1998	Boherbue Comprehensive	
1997	St. Mark's, Warrenpoint	Clonakilty CS
1996	St. Comhghalls College, Lisnaskea	Davitt college, Castlebar
1995	St. Mark's, Warrenpoint	Tullow Community School
1994		
1993	St. Ciarans HS, Ballygawley 0–16	Rathmore CC 2-08
1992	St. Joseph's, Coalisland 2-04	Davitt College, Castlebar 0-09
1991	Rathmore CC 4–16	Kilkeel 3-02
1990	Killorglin CC 1-06	St. Pats, Dungiven 1-05
1989	St. Pius X, Magherafelt 3-05	Edenderry 0-06
1988	St. Mark's, Warrenpoint 5–14	Moneenageisha 0-06
1987	St. Pius X, Magherafelt 6–11	Dunshaughlin VS 0-03
1986	St. Pat's, Omagh 2-05	Ars Scoil Chiarain 0-09
1985	St. Pius X, Magherafelt 2–17	Scoil Stiofain Naofa 0-01
1984	Edenderry 1–4	Limavady 1–3
1983	Ard Scoil Chiarain, Clara 4–11	Tipperary Town 2-06
1982	Castlewellan 4-04	Scoil Stiofain Naofa 1-04
1981	Dungannon 1–12	Scoil Stiofain Naofa 2-07
1980	St. Paul's, Bessbrook 1–11	Newcastlewest 0-06
1979	Tullow CC 3-07	Midleton 2-02
1978	St. Pius X, Magherafelt 2–12	Newcastlewest 0-06
1977	St. Mark's, Warrenpoint 3–10	Rathmore 1-04
1976	St. Mark's, Warrenpoint 5-09	Swords 0-04
1975	St. Mark's, Warrenpoint 2-07	Tuam 2-04
1974	Johnstown	Galway City

=== Junior Hurling Roll of Honour ===
Year	Winner	Opponent
2013	Athenry VS 2–14	Causeway Comprehensive 1–16
2012	St. Brigid's, Loughrea	Causeway Comprehensive
2011	St. Brigid's, Loughrea	Colaiste Mhuire, Johnstown
2010	Causeway Comprehensive 2-21	St. Brigid's, Loughrea 1–12
2009	Causeway Comprehensive	Banagher College
2008	Athenry VS	Borris
2007	Athenry VS	Roscrea
2006	St. Brigid's, Loughrea	Borrisokane
2005	Athenry VS	Scoil Mhuire, Johnstown
2004	St. Rynagh's, Banagher	Roscrea
2003	Roscrea	St. Brigid's, Loughrea
2002	Borrisokane	Kilcormac
2001	Athenry	Roscrea
2000	Athenry	Causeway Comprehensive
1999	St. Brigid's, Loughrea	St. Fergal's, Rathdowney
1998		
1997	St. Brigid's, Loughrea	Causeway Comprehensive
1996		St Fergal's Rathdowney
1995	Athenry	
1994	St. Brigid's, Loughrea 1–15	Killenaule 0–11
1993	New Ross 4-08	Loughrea 3–10
1992	Killenaule 3-04	Gort 2-04
1991	Gort 3-05	Causeway 2-06
1990	Borrisokane 4-09	Thomastown 2-07
1989	Killenaule 4-07	Ballyhale 4-04
1988	Johnstown 2–13	New Inn 1-09
1987	Johnstown 2-06	Bandon 2-03
1986	Moneengeisha 2-04	Rath Luirc 1-03
1985	Rathdowney 5-08	Loughrea 2-07
1984	Banagher 2-04	Borrisokane 1-05
1983	Borrisokane 3-05, 2-08 (R)	Loughrea 2-08, 1-07 (R)
1982	Rathdowney 1–12	Moneengeisha 1-05
