= Iestyn Harris (rugby union, born 1998) =

Welsh rugby union player

- Born: 24 November 1998 (age 27) Wales
- Height: 1.81 m (5 ft 11 1/2 in)
- Weight: 97 kg (15.3 st; 214 lb)

Rugby union career
- Position: Hooker
- Current team: Exeter Chiefs
Senior career
Years	Team	Apps	(Points)
2020–2022	Cardiff	3	(0)
2022–2024	Exeter Chiefs		
- Correct as of 29 April 2022
International career
Years	Team	Apps	(Points)
2018	Wales U20s	10	(0)
- Correct as of 23 November 2020

Iestyn Harris (born 24 November 1998) is a Welsh rugby union player, currently playing for Premiership Rugby side Exeter Chiefs. His preferred position is hooker.

On the 6th April 2022, Harris was released by Cardiff Rugby, he proceeded to sign for the Exeter Chiefs following his release, he will begin service in the 2022–23 season.

In May 2024, he was forced to retire from rugby for medical reasons.

== Cardiff Blues ==
Harris signed his first professional contract for Cardiff Blues in September 2020. He made his Cardiff Blues debut in Round 7 of the 2020–21 Pro14 against Leinster.
