= Tony Buckley =

Ireland international rugby union player

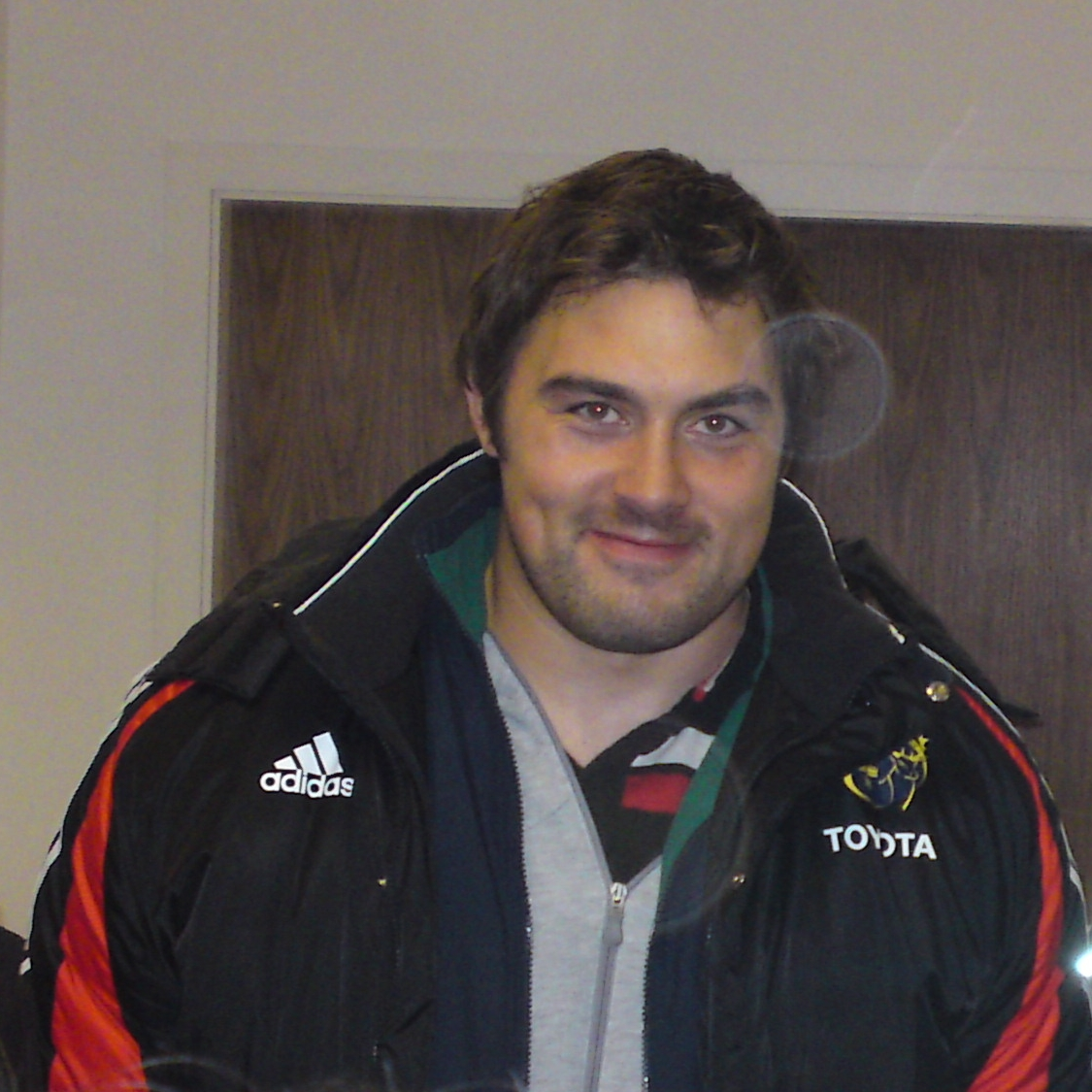
- Buckley in 2009
- Born: Anthony Buckley; 18 September 1980 (age 46) Cork, Ireland
- Height: 1.96 m (6 ft 5 in)
- Weight: 138 kg (21.7 st; 304 lb)
- School: Boherbue Comprehensive School; Newbridge College; St Peter's College

Rugby union career
- Position: Prop
Amateur team(s)
Years	Team	Apps	(Points)
- Shannon RFC
Senior career
Years	Team	Apps	(Points)
2004–2005	Connacht	60	(25)
2005–2011	Munster	96	(40)
2011–2014	Sale Sharks	57	(10)
- Correct as of 9 February 2014
International career
Years	Team	Apps	(Points)
2007–2011	Ireland	25	(10)
2009–2011	Ireland Wolfhounds	6	(5)
- Correct as of 26 September 2011

Tony Buckley (born 8 October 1980) is a former Irish rugby union player who played Prop. He was one of the heaviest men playing professional rugby, weighing in at 21 st 10 lbs or 138 kilograms (305 lbs). He wore size 16 boots which had to be custom made for him in Germany. He joined Sale Sharks on a 3-year deal from the 2011/12 season.

== Career ==
=== Early career ===
Buckley has a background in Gaelic games. He first started playing rugby for Kanturk R.F.C in Co Cork. Educated in Newbridge College, Buckley initially played rugby with the school team as a Second Row. He was capped for Leinster Schools before playing for Shannon RFC. He also spent 1998 in New Zealand at St Peter's College representing their 1st XV. Alongside him in the front row was future Tongan international and Northampton prop Soane Tongaʻuiha.

=== Club/Provincial ===
Buckley joined Munster from Connacht in 2005 but his first two years were interrupted with injury. Following initial reports, it was thought that he would move to Bath on a one-year contract at the end of the 2007 season. However, it was later announced that he would remain at Munster until 2009, after agreeing to a two-year contract extension. The 2007–08 season provided Buckley with increased game time, starting four of the first six matches in the Celtic League, followed by making his Heineken Cup debut against the London Wasps. It was during this match that Buckley came on for the injured John Hayes and within minutes had put Simon Shaw to ground with a hand-off on his own line. After another disappointing season in which he lost his place in the Irish squad to Mike Ross and Munster failed to qualify for the Heineken Cup quarter-finals for the first time in over a decade, Buckley decided to join Sale Sharks for the 2011/12 season.

=== International career ===
In April 2007, Buckley was named in the Irish squad for a tour of Argentina. He was listed among the replacements in the matchday XXII for the first test in Santa Fé on 26 May, during which he gained his first of two caps on the tour. Later that year he was added to the 2007 Rugby World Cup squad as an injury replacement for Simon Best, but did not feature during the tournament following Ireland's exit at the group stages. Buckley's competitive debut came in the 2008 Six Nations Championship, when he was introduced for last 10 minutes of Ireland's opening fixture against Italy on 2 February 2008. He scored his first international try a year later against Canada on 24 May 2009, during the summer tour of North America. He also scored again for Ireland A against Georgia in the Churchill Cup, on 14 June 2009. Buckley was seen as the long term successor to John Hayes for club and country. Mike Ross was given the chance to start for Ireland in the 2011 Six Nations and Buckley was left out of the squad. He instead played for Ireland Wolfhounds. He was selected in Ireland's 43-man training squad for the 2011 World Cup, and won a place in the final 30-man squad to go to New Zealand. On 25 September 2011, Buckley scored his first World Cup try against Russia, in what turned out to be his final international appearance for Ireland. The 6 ft 5ins tighthead won 25 caps for Ireland over the course of his career.

== Retirement ==
Buckley confirmed his retirement from professional rugby in June 2014, but decided to continue to play rugby non-professionally with Ulster Bank League side Kanturk. Buckley said "I am lucky that I have emerged from professional rugby relatively intact and capable of enjoying my last couple of seasons with the club I started with. For now it’s back to civilian life".

== Head injury lawsuit ==
In 2023, Buckley launched legal action against Munster Rugby and the IRFU, claiming that repeated concussions had caused long term head injuries. Buckley is one of at least four former Ireland Rugby players to link concussion to traumatic brain injury.

== Statistics ==
=== International analysis by opposition ===
Against	Played	Won	Lost	Drawn	Tries	Points	% Won
Argentina	3	1	2	0	0	0	33.33
Australia	2	0	2	0	0	0	0
Canada	2	2	0	0	1	5	100
England	2	1	1	0	0	0	50
Fiji	1	1	0	0	0	0	100
France	2	0	2	0	0	0	0
Italy	1	1	0	0	0	0	100
New Zealand	3	0	3	0	0	0	0
Russia	1	1	0	0	1	5	100
Scotland	3	1	2	0	0	0	33.33
South Africa	1	0	1	0	0	0	0
United States	2	2	0	0	0	0	100
Wales	2	1	1	0	0	0	50
Total	25	11	14	0	2	10	44

Correct as of 5 July 2017
