= Grant Webb =

- Born: Grant Webb; 26 April 1979 (age 47) Palmerston North, New Zealand
- Height: 6 ft 3 in (1.91 m)
- Weight: 16 st 8 lb (105 kg)

Rugby union career
- Position: Number Eight
Amateur team(s)
Years	Team	Apps	(Points)
- University of Otago
Senior career
Years	Team	Apps	(Points)
2006–2007	Toyota Verblitz		
2007–2008	Ulster	4	(0)
2008–2010	Newport GD	38	(5)
- Correct as of 2008-05-05
Provincial / State sides
Years	Team	Apps	(Points)
2004–2005	Otago		
2007	Hawke's Bay		
Super Rugby
Years	Team	Apps	(Points)
- Highlanders
International career
Years	Team	Apps	(Points)
- NZ Sevens
- Correct as of 22 January 2007

Grant Webb (born 11 August 1979 in Palmerston North, New Zealand) is a New Zealand rugby union player. He plays his rugby as a number eight.

== Career ==
Webb played for Otago, during which time he faced the British and Irish Lions

In 2005 he joined the Toyota Verblitz club in Japan's Top League. On 20 December 2007 Webb arrived in Belfast on a season long contract with Magners League team Ulster Rugby, following a season playing in New Zealand's NPC tournament, with Hawkes Bay.

In May 2008, he joined Welsh regional side the Newport Gwent Dragons. Webb was released by Newport Gwent Dragons at the end of the 2009–10 season.
