= Simon Best =

Ireland international rugby union player

- Born: Simon Best; 11 February 1978 (age 48) Craigavon, Northern Ireland
- Height: 1.85 m (6 ft 1 in)
- Weight: 114 kg (17 st 13 lb)
- School: Portadown College
- University: Newcastle University
- Notable relative: Rory Best (brother)

Rugby union career
- Position: Prop
Amateur team(s)
Years	Team	Apps	(Points)
- Banbridge
Senior career
Years	Team	Apps	(Points)
1996-1999	Newcastle Falcons		
1999-2008	Ulster	118	(25)
International career
Years	Team	Apps	(Points)
2005-06	Ireland A	7	(5)
2003-08	Ireland	23	(5)

Simon Best (born 11 February 1978) is an Irish former rugby union player who played prop for Newcastle Falcons, Ulster, and the Ireland national team. He is the brother of former Ulster and Ireland hooker Rory Best. He was club captain in Ulster's 2005–06 Celtic League-winning season, and captained Ireland twice. He is a member of the IRUPA Hall of Fame.

He was educated at Portadown College and represented Ireland at schools, U19, U21, U25 and A levels. He studied Agriculture at Newcastle University, playing rugby for the university team and the Newcastle Falcons second team, and as his degree progressed, the Falcons' first team. When he graduated in 1999, he was offered contracts by both Newcastle and Ulster, and opted to join Ulster.

He became a regular starter in the Ulster front row, and in 2005, following the retirement of Andy Ward, he was named team captain, and led Ulster to be champions of the 2005–06 Celtic League. He sustained a broken leg in the penultimate match of the campaign against Llanelli Scarlets, which kept him out for six months, returning and regaining the captaincy in December 2006.

He won his first Ireland cap in 2003, coming off the bench against Tonga in May 2003. He was named in the Ireland squad for the 2003 Rugby World Cup, and was a regular in the Ireland team for the next four years. He captained Ireland twice on their 2007 tour of Argentina, and was again in the squad for the 2007 Rugby World Cup. He made three appearances in the tournament, before suffering a mini-stroke, experiencing a loss of feeling on his right side, while visiting Bordeaux and being rushed to hospital. He was diagnosed with an irregular heart rhythm, and he retired in February 2008 following medical assessment. In 2014 he was inducted into the IRUPA Hall of Fame.

Since retiring from rugby, he has run a farm with his parents and brother Rory. He was given the UK Arable Farmer of the Year award in 2021.
