= Neil McMillan =

- Born: 15 May 1981 (age 45) Northern Ireland
- Height: 1.80 m (5 ft 11 in)
- Weight: 100 kg (15 st 10 lb)
- School: Belfast Royal Academy

Rugby union career
- Position: Flanker
Senior career
| Years | Team | Apps | (Points) |
| 2001–08 | Ulster Rugby | 54 | (35) |
| 2008–10 | Harlequins | 22 | (5) |
| 2010–11 | Sale Sharks | 13 | (10) |
| 2013- | NYAC | | |
International career
| Years | Team | Apps | (Points) |
| 2006 | Ireland A | 3 | (5) |

Neil McMillan (born 15 May 1981) is an Irish rugby union flanker.

McMillan was educated at Belfast Royal Academy, and at the age of fifteen was part of the BRA Schools' Cup winning team in 1997. He was selected for Ireland's Under-19, Under-21, Sevens and 'A' teams, spent a year with Leicester Tigers' under-21 team, before signing for Ulster before the 2001–02 season, soon making his debut against Llanelli Scarlets. He won the IRUPA Young Player of the Year award in 2003.

He played for Ulster for eight years, and was part of the team that won the 2005–06 Celtic League. He moved to Harlequins in 2008. He joined Sale Sharks in 2010, leaving at the end of the 2010-11 season.
