= Rory Best =

Ireland international rugby union player

Rory Best OBE
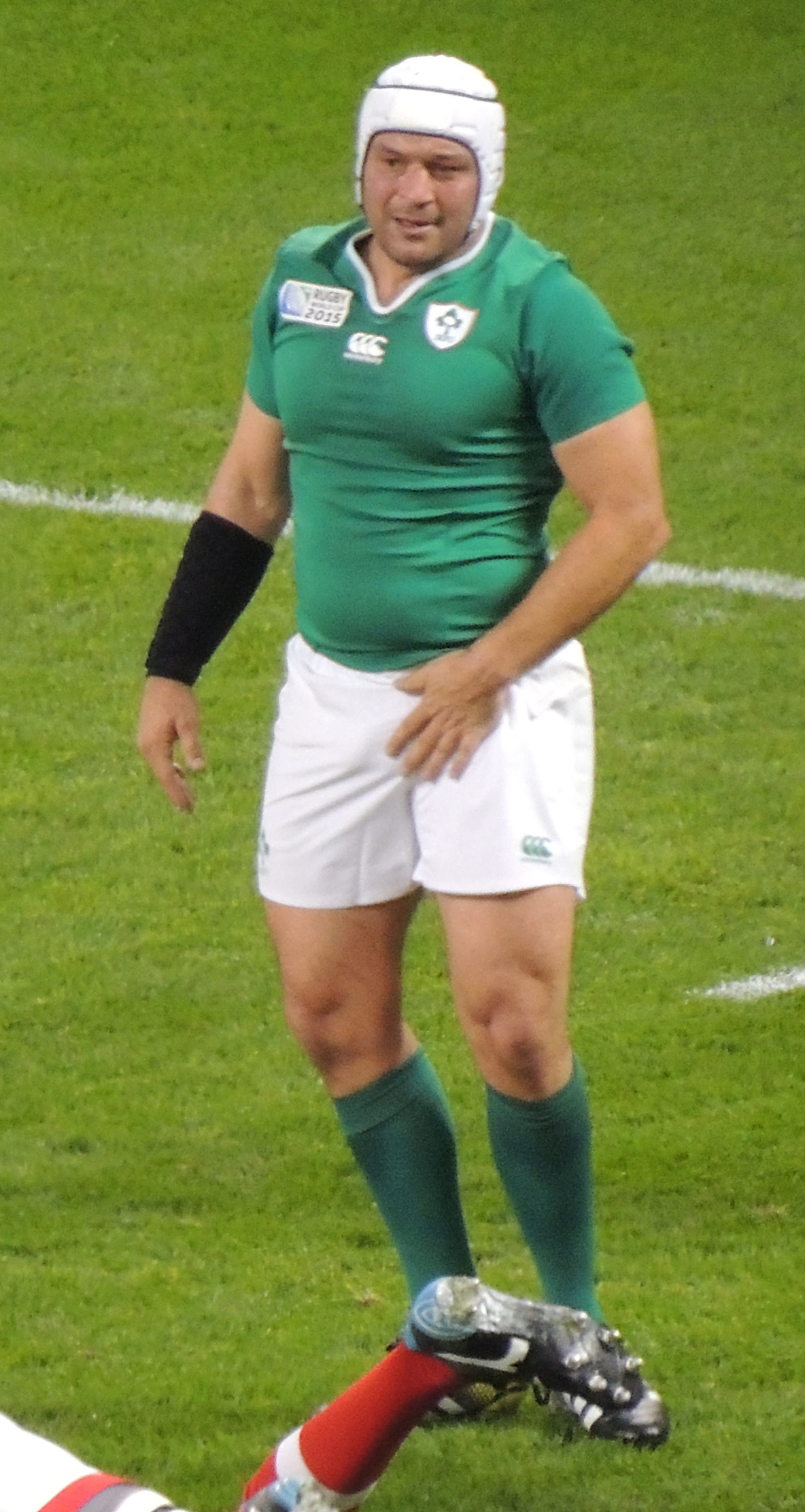
- Best representing Ireland at the 2015 Rugby World Cup
- Born: Rory David Best; 15 August 1982 (age 44) Craigavon, Northern Ireland
- Height: 1.82 m (6 ft 0 in)
- Weight: 105 kg (16 st 7 lb; 231 lb)
- School: Portadown College
- University: Newcastle University
- Notable relative: Simon Best (brother)

Rugby union career
- Position: Hooker
Amateur team(s)
Years	Team	Apps	(Points)
2000–2003	Banbridge RFC		
Senior career
Years	Team	Apps	(Points)
2004–2019	Ulster	221	(115)
- Correct as of 17 May 2019
International career
Years	Team	Apps	(Points)
2010	Ireland Wolfhounds	1	(0)
2005–2019	Ireland	124	(60)
2013, 2017	British & Irish Lions	0	(0)
- Correct as of 6 June 2021
Coaching career
- Years: Team
- 2021–: Seattle Seawolves (high-performance)
- –: Fiji (forwards and scrum)
- Correct as of 24 April 2021

Rory David Best OBE (born 15 August 1982) is a Northern Irish former rugby union player who was the captain of the Ireland national team from 2016 to 2019. He played hooker for Ulster and was registered for Banbridge RFC. Best earned 124 caps for Ireland, making his debut in 2005 and retiring at the end of the 2019 Rugby World Cup, his fourth World Cup. He toured with the British & Irish Lions in 2013 and 2017. Since retiring as a player, he has worked in the media, coaching and rugby administration. In October 2025 he was appointed general manager of Ulster.

== Early life ==
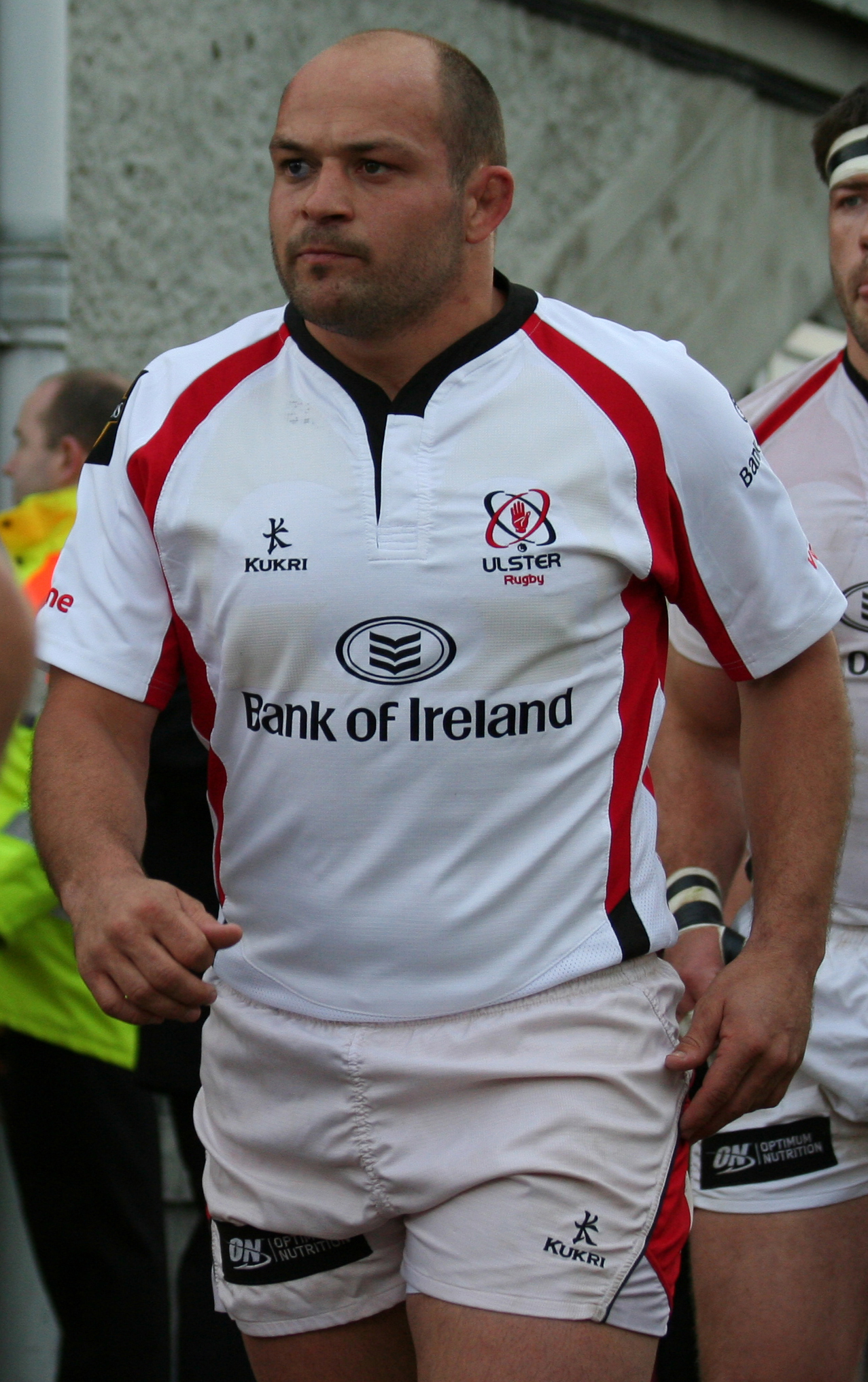
Best appearing for Ulster in 2012 Magner's League match versus Ospreys

Best was raised in Poyntzpass, County Armagh. His mother is English, from Middlesbrough, Yorkshire. He was educated at Tandragee Junior High School and Portadown College. He then studied agriculture at The University of Newcastle.

== Club career ==
Best returned home to join Belfast Harlequins in 2002 where he captained the team and gained his first Ulster contract in 2004. He made his debut for Ulster as a replacement at home to Munster in the 2005 Celtic League. He replaced his brother (now retired Ireland and Ulster prop Simon) as Ulster captain for the 2007/08 season and held the position the position until he retired in 2019. He is renowned for his abilities as a scrummager. Best missed the entire 2009/10 season due to surgery on a chronic disc problem. Best scored two tries in 2011/12 and 2010/11 for Ulster. He was part of the Ulster side that was defeated by Leinster in The Heineken Cup final in 2012.

Best played his 200th game for Ulster in the Pro14 in 2017, earning the honour against Leinster.

== International career ==
=== 2005–2012 ===
Best made his international debut for Ireland as a replacement against the All Blacks at Lansdowne Road in November 2005 and made his first start against the Springboks in 2006. He has been involved with the national team ever since, initially sharing the number 2 shirt with Jerry Flannery. He was a member of the Irish teams that won the 2007 Triple Crown and was in the Irish squad for the 2007 Rugby World Cup as well as the 2009 Six Nations Championship which completed the Grand Slam.

He captained the Ireland team that toured North America in 2009, while many of his Ireland teammates were on the British & Irish Lions team that began their tour of South Africa at the same time. He became the first-choice hooker at the 2011 Rugby World Cup after an injury to Jerry Flannery. Best also played his 50th test for Ireland during the World Cup, scoring a try as Ireland beat the United States during the pool stages.

He was chosen to captain Ireland again, during the 2012 Six Nations Championship, after Paul O'Connell was injured.

=== 2013–2019 ===
Best was added to the British & Irish Lions squad for the tour to Australia on 26 May after English hooker Dylan Hartley was removed from the squad after receiving a red card in the Aviva Premiership final for abuse of an official on 25 May 2013. In 2014 Best won his 2nd Six Nations title.

In January 2016, Best was named as the new Ireland captain for the 2016 Six Nations Championship. On 26 November 2016, Best became Ireland's fifth centurion, gaining his 100th cap in a test match vs Australia in the Aviva Stadium, Dublin. The previous week, Best captained Ireland to a historic 40–29 win over New Zealand in his 99th appearance, Ireland's first ever win over New Zealand.

After finishing the 2017 Six Nations, Best was selected for the British & Irish Lions for the second time, on the 2017 tour to New Zealand. Best started in four of the five matches he played on tour, captaining the Lions to a 34–6 win over the Chiefs and a 31–31 draw against the Hurricanes. Best was not subbed off in either of those matches, and received an OBE while he was on tour with the Lions.

Best continued as captain for Ireland for the 2018 Six Nations Championship, leading the team to a historic third Grand Slam and Triple Crown, as well as winning the tournament, by defeating England at Twickenham Stadium on Saint Patrick's Day.

Although Best missed the mid-year test series against Australia's Wallabies, with Peter O'Mahony captaining Ireland in his place, Best returned for the 2018 end-of-year rugby union internationals. Best cemented his place as one of the most successful captains in Irish rugby history during the end of 2018, leading Ireland out against New Zealand on 17 November 2018. Ireland beat New Zealand by 16–9, winning their ninth test in a single year.

On 18 April 2019, Best announced that he would retire from professional rugby after the 2019 Rugby World Cup. "It is with mixed feelings that I announce my retirement from Ulster Rugby as of the end of this season," said Best. "This feels like the right time for me to go out on my terms, a luxury for which I feel very privileged,".

His final match for Ireland was on 19 October 2019, when they lost to New Zealand, 14–46 in the quarter-finals of the 2019 Rugby World Cup, which was also Best's fourth World Cup tournament. Best was replaced by Niall Scannell in the 63rd minute, receiving a standing ovation from the crowd as he left the field. His achievements across his career earned his subsequent praise from All Blacks Captain, Kieran Read.

He is the only Irish captain to have a win over Australia, New Zealand and South Africa and he is one of a few captains to achieve this.

Best played his last two professional rugby matches for the Barbarians in November 2019. In the first, on 16 November 2019 at Twickenham, he captained the team in the Killic Cup match against the Flying Fijians who won 33–31. He again captained the Baa-Baas in his final match against Wales at the Principality Stadium, Cardiff, on 30 November 2019. Wales won 43–33. When substituted in the 51st minute, Best received a standing ovation from the crowd, paying tribute to him and marking the end of his illustrious career.

== Statistics ==
=== International analysis by opposition ===
Against	Played	Won	Lost	Drawn	Tries	Points	% Won
Argentina	7	5	2	0	0	0	71.43
Australia	8	4	4	0	0	0	50
Canada	3	3	0	0	0	0	100
England	16	7	9	0	0	0	43.75
France	16	7	7	2	1	5	43.75
Georgia	1	1	0	0	1	5	100
Italy	14	13	1	0	1	5	92.86
Japan	1	0	1	0	0	0	0
Namibia	1	1	0	0	0	0	100
New Zealand	12	2	10	0	1	5	14.29
Pacific Islanders	1	1	0	0	1	5	100
Samoa	3	3	0	0	1	5	100
Scotland	15	11	4	0	2	10	73.33
South Africa	6	3	3	0	0	0	50
United States	2	2	0	0	2	10	100
Wales	18	10	7	1	2	10	68.75
Total	124	73	48	3	12	60	58.87

== Coaching career ==
In April 2021, Best was announced as a technical and high-performance skills coach for the Seattle Seawolves alongside former Ireland international, Allen Clarke.

== Honours ==
Best was appointed Officer of the Order of the British Empire (OBE) in the 2017 Birthday Honours for services to rugby. In 2026 he was inducted into the Rugby Players Ireland Hall of Fame.

=== Ulster ===
- Pro12:
  - Winner (1): 2005–06

=== Ireland ===
- Six Nations Championship:
  - Winner (4): 2009, 2014, 2015, 2018
- Grand Slam:
  - Winner (2): 2009, 2018
- Triple Crown:
  - Winner (4): 2006, 2007, 2009, 2018

== Personal life ==
Best was raised on the family farm near Poyntzpass, County Armagh; his older brother Simon also played for Ulster and Ireland.

Rory married Jodie Bell, a schoolteacher in Richhill in the summer of 2009; they have two boys and one girl.

Rory is a tillage and beef farmer, with his father and his brother Simon in County Down.

In 2018, while still Irish rugby captain, he was criticised for attending a rape trial His attendance was seen as signalling his support for teammates on trial for the alleged gang rape of a teenage girl. The defendants were ultimately acquitted. He admitted regret in attending the trial a year later in interviews with the press.
