= Jerry Flannery =

Irish rugby union coach

- Born: Jeremiah Paul Flannery; 17 October 1978 (age 48) Galway, Ireland
- Height: 1.80 m (5 ft 11 in)
- Weight: 100 kg (16 st; 220 lb)
- School: St. Munchin's College
- University: University College Cork

Rugby union career
- Position: Hooker
Amateur team(s)
Years	Team	Apps	(Points)
–	Shannon		
Senior career
Years	Team	Apps	(Points)
2001–2003	Connacht	6	(0)
2003–2012	Munster	93	(40)
- Correct as of 18 June 2011
International career
Years	Team	Apps	(Points)
2005–2011	Ireland	41	(15)
2009	British & Irish Lions	0	(0)
- Correct as of 12 September 2011
Coaching career
- Years: Team
- 2013–2014: Arsenal F.C. (Strength & Conditioning coach)
- 2014–2017: Munster (Scrum coach)
- 2017–2019: Munster (Forwards coach)
- 2020–2024: Harlequins (Lineout & defence coach)
- 2024–: South Africa (Defence coach)

Jeremiah Paul Flannery (born 17 October 1978) is an Irish rugby union former player and current defence coach for South Africa. During his playing career, Flannery, a hooker, played for Munster and Ireland, before being forced to retire in March 2012 due to injury problems. He joined Munster as a coach before leaving in 2019, and, in 2020, joined English Premiership club Harlequins as their lineout coach.

== Playing career ==
=== Early career ===
Although capped at Ireland Schools level while attending St Munchin's College (Limerick), and with a fine underage pedigree, Flannery had to wait patiently for his opportunities, but made the most of those that eventually came his way. He began his professional career with Connacht, where he spent two seasons vying for the hooker's jersey with Marnus Uijs.

=== Munster ===
Flannery then moved to Munster, where he initially found his opportunities severely restricted by the consistent form of Frankie Sheahan, a regular Ireland international. He did, however, make his Heineken Cup debut as a replacement against Stade Français at Thomond Park in the quarter final in April 2004, which Munster won 37–32.

Following a serious neck injury to Sheahan in 2005, Flannery made the Munster Number 2 jersey his own. Voted Man-of-the-Match on his first try-scoring Heineken Cup start against Castres, Flannery's outstanding form and ability to compete at the highest level meant that he was promptly called into the Ireland squad, and made his international debut against Romania in November 2005 where he came on as a replacement. He played a key part in Munster's Heineken Cup winning teams of 2005/06 and 2007/08.

He missed the majority of the 2009/10 season through injury, playing only 6 matches, and also missed much of the 2010/11 season, again through injury, featuring only against Toulon in October and Ulster in January. His most recent injury occurred during the Ulster game.

His last game for Munster was the above-mentioned fixture against Ulster in January 2011, a game which Munster won 35–10 in front of the Thomond Park crowd.

=== Ireland ===
By January 2006, Flannery was installed as Ireland's first-choice hooker, and played his first full international game against Italy in the Six Nations Championship. He retained his place in the side that claimed the Triple crown in 2006, and was unanimously chosen as the Six Nations' best hooker of that season. In the 2006 mid year test series Flannery played all the matches against New Zealand and Australia scoring one try. Bedevilled by injury in late 2006, Flannery briefly lost his place in the Ireland side to Ulster's Rory Best. Flannery did, however, appear as a replacement in each of Ireland's Six Nations fixtures in 2007.

Having toured Argentina with the shadow squad, he was also a try-scoring member of Ireland's 2007 Rugby World Cup squad in France, starting the games against France and Argentina. He was a member of the victorious Ireland team that won the 2009 Six Nations Championship and Grand Slam. Flannery was suspended for 8 weeks in 2008 for stamping on Julien Bonnaire; the penalty was subsequently reduced to 4 weeks, which allowed him to play in the 6 Nations tournament.

In February 2010, Flannery was cited for "an alleged kick" on France wing Alexis Palisson during the 2010 Six Nations Championship defeat in Paris. He received a six-week ban which ruled him out of the remainder of the 2010 Six Nations.

Flannery missed the 2010 June Tests, the 2010 November Tests and the 2011 Six Nations through injury, but was selected in Ireland's preliminary squad for the 2011 World Cup warms-ups in August. He made his comeback against Scotland in the 2011 Rugby World Cup warm-up in August, and was selected in Ireland's 30-man squad for the World Cup. Despite coming through Ireland's four warm-up Tests in August and the first pool game against US Eagles in September, Flannery suffered a recurrence of the troublesome calf injury in training and was forced to withdraw from Ireland's World Cup squad, being replaced by Damien Varley.

He stayed in New Zealand for the second pool game a week later against Australia, handing out the match jerseys to the players before the fixture, an occasion described as 'emotional' by the Irish players and staff. The opening game against the USA turned out to be Flannery's last for Ireland, as injury ruled him out of the 2012 Six Nations Championship and forced him to retire in March 2012.

=== British & Irish Lions ===
On 21 April 2009, Flannery was named as a member of the British & Irish Lions for the 2009 tour to South Africa. One month later, however, on 21 May, he sustained an elbow injury during training which ruled him out of the tour.

=== Retirement ===
After a series of long-term injuries, Flannery announced his retirement from playing in March 2012.

== Coaching career ==
Flannery started a master's degree in Sports Performance at the University of Limerick.

In July 2013, Flannery joined Premier League football team Arsenal on a work placement as a strength and conditioning coach.

Flannery returned to Munster as scrum coach when Anthony Foley's backroom staff were announced on 20 May 2014. In June 2017, Flannery signed a two-year contract extension with Munster, with his role expanding from Scrum coach to Forwards coach. He left his coaching role with Munster in June 2019, and, in June 2020, joined English Premiership club Harlequins as their lineout coach. Flannery, whose remit at Harlequins was expanded to include defence coaching, signed a new permanent contract with no end date with Harlequins in February 2022.

== Business interests ==
Flannery owns a stake in MaximumMedia, the parent company of websites Joe.ie and Her.ie.

He owns Jerry Flannery's, a large sports pub in Catherine Street, Limerick.

== Broadcasting ==
Flannery has also worked as a pundit for eir Sport's television coverage and continues to do so for RTÉ.

== Statistics ==
=== International analysis by opposition ===
Against	Played	Won	Lost	Drawn	Tries	Points	% Won
Argentina	3	1	2	0	0	0	33.33
Australia	3	0	2	1	0	0	0
Canada	1	1	0	0	0	0	100
England	4	3	1	0	0	0	75
Fiji	1	1	0	0	0	0	100
France	7	1	6	0	0	0	14.29
Georgia	1	1	0	0	0	0	100
Italy	5	5	0	0	1	5	100
Namibia	1	1	0	0	1	5	100
New Zealand	4	0	4	0	1	5	0
Romania	1	1	0	0	0	0	100
Scotland	5	3	2	0	0	0	60
South Africa	1	1	0	0	0	0	100
United States	1	1	0	0	0	0	100
Wales	3	3	0	0	0	0	100
Total	41	23	17	1	3	15	56.1

Correct as of 5 July 2017

== Honours ==
=== Munster ===
- European Rugby Champions Cup:
  - Winner (2): 2005–06, 2007–08
- United Rugby Championship:
  - Winner (2): 2008–09, 2010–11

=== Ireland ===
- Six Nations Championship:
  - Winner (1): 2009
- Grand Slam:
  - Winner (1): 2009
- Triple Crown:
  - Winner (3): 2006, 2007, 2009
