= Bryan Young (rugby union) =

Rugby union player from Northern Ireland

- Born: Bryan Young; 11 June 1981 (age 45) Belfast, Northern Ireland
- Height: 1.85 m (6 ft 1 in)
- Weight: 110 kg (17 st 5 lb; 243 lb)
- School: Ballymena Academy

Rugby union career
- Position: Prop
Amateur team(s)
Years	Team	Apps	(Points)
- Ballymena
Senior career
Years	Team	Apps	(Points)
2002-11	Ulster	132	(0)
2011-12	Cavalieri	4	(0)
International career
Years	Team	Apps	(Points)
2006-09	Ireland A	9	(0)
2006-07	Ireland	8	(0)
- Correct as of 11 August 2007

Bryan Young (born 11 June 1981) is a retired Irish rugby union player. He played for Ulster and Cavalieri. He is currently fitness and nutrition coach in Dalriada School, Ballymoney, and head coach of their First XV Rugby team.

Young is from Ballymena, County Antrim, Northern Ireland. The middle of three children his elder brother Robert is the current captain of Ballymena. Bryan, nicknamed "Bear" is regarded as technically one of the best scrummaging props.

While Young made his Ulster debut in April 2002 against Connacht, it was not until the 2005–06 Celtic League that he really made his breakthrough, playing in all but one match that season. Young's performances for Ulster brought him to the attention of the national selectors and he was part of the Ireland squad that toured New Zealand and Australia in June 2006 where he won his first two international caps coming on as a replacement in two of the tests. He was in Ireland's squad at the 2007 Rugby World Cup.
