= 2009 June rugby union tests =

The 2009 mid-year rugby union tests (also known as the summer internationals in the Northern Hemisphere) refers to the rugby union Internationals played from 23 May to 4 July 2009.

France and Italy travelled to Oceania. England played home matches against the Barbarians and Argentina and then travelled to Argentina for a return match with the Pumas, while Ireland and Wales went to North America. The Argentine Rugby Union moved the first game to England in an effort to raise money and to be sure their Europe-based players were available.

== Overview ==
=== Series ===
Tour	Result	Victor
South Africa v British & Irish Lions test series	1–2	South Africa
Argentina v England test series	1–1	Drawn
New Zealand v France test series	1–1	Drawn
Australia v Italy test series	2–0	Australia

Notes:

- France and New Zealand drew their tour as France won the first test, but New Zealand won the second test, making a tour result of 1–1.

=== Other tours ===
Team/Tour	Opponents
Barbarians end of season tour	England (won) – Australia (lost)
Wales tour	Canada (won) – United States (won)
Ireland tour	Canada (won) – United States (won)

== Fixtures ==
23 May 2009
14:00 PTZ (UTC-07)

Canada	6–25	Ireland
Pen: Pritchard (2/2) 38', 43'	Report	Try: Murphy 18' c Whitten 63' c Buckley 69' m Con: Keatley (2/3); Pen: Keatley (2/3) 57', 61'

Thunderbird Stadium, Vancouver, British Columbia
Attendance: 7,280
Referee: Chris White (England)

Team details

FB	15	James Pritchard
RW	14	Dean van Camp
OC	13	Ciaran Hearn
IC	12	Ryan Smith
LW	11	D. T. H. van der Merwe
FH	10	Dave Spicer
SH	9	Ed Fairhurst
N8	8	Aaron Carpenter
OF	7	Adam Kleeberger
BF	6	Chauncey O'Toole
RL	5	Mike Burak
LL	4	Tyler Hotson
TP	3	Scott Franklin
HK	2	Pat Riordan (c)
LP	1	Kevin Tkachuk
Replacements:
HK	16	Andrew Tiedemann
LK	17	Luke Tait
LK	18	Jebb Sinclair
FL	19	Nanyak Dala
FL	20	Sean-Michael Stephen
SH	21	Phil Mack
FH	22	Ander Monro
Coach:
(New Zealand) Kieran Crowley

FB	15	Gavin Duffy
RW	14	Barry Murphy
OC	13	Darren Cave
IC	12	Ian Whitten
LW	11	Ian Dowling
FH	10	Ian Keatley
SH	9	Peter Stringer
N8	8	Denis Leamy
OF	7	Niall Ronan
BF	6	John Muldoon
RL	5	Mick O'Driscoll
LL	4	Bob Casey
TP	3	Tony Buckley
HK	2	Rory Best (c)
LP	1	Tom Court
Replacements:
HK	16	Seán Cronin
PR	17	Mike Ross
LK	18	Ryan Caldwell
FL	19	Donnacha Ryan
SH	20	Eoin Reddan
FH	21	Niall O'Connor
FB	22	Denis Hurley
Coach:
(Ireland) Declan Kidney

30 May 2009
14:45 ETZ (UTC-04)

Canada	23–32	Wales
Try: Duke 42' c Fairhurst 57' c Con: Pritchard (2/2); Pen: Pritchard (3) 9', 14', 31'	Report	Try: Czekaj 16' c T. James 48' c Con: Biggar (2/2); Pen: Biggar (6) 22', 28', 33', 52', 56', 72'

York Stadium, Toronto, Ontario
Attendance: 8,450
Referee: Matt Goddard (Australia)

30 May 2009
16:15 WEST/GMT+01 (UTC+01)

England	26–33	Barbarians
Try: Foden; Turner-Hall; May; Banahan; Con: Goode (3)	Report	Try: Balshaw (2); Jack; Elsom; D'Arcy; Con: Blair (4)

Twickenham Stadium, London
Attendance: 40,121
Referee: Romain Poite (France)

FB	15	Delon Armitage
RW	14	Ben Foden
OC	13	Jamie Noon
IC	12	Jordan Turner-Hall
LW	11	Matt Banahan
FH	10	Andy Goode
SH	9	Danny Care
N8	8	Lewis Moody
OF	7	Nick Easter
BF	6	Chris Robshaw
RL	5	Louis Deacon
LL	4	Steve Borthwick (c)
TP	3	David Wilson
HK	2	Dylan Hartley
LP	1	Tim Payne
Substitutions:
HK	16	Steve Thompson
PR	17	Nick Wood
LK	18	Chris Jones
FL	19	Steffon Armitage
N8	20	James Haskell
SH	21	Paul Hodgson
CE	22	Tom May
Team manager:
Martin Johnson

FB	15	(New Zealand) Ben Blair
RW	14	(New Zealand) Doug Howlett
OC	13	(England) Josh Lewsey
IC	12	(Ireland) Gordon D'Arcy
LW	11	(England) Iain Balshaw
FH	10	(New Zealand) Glen Jackson
SH	9	(New Zealand) Justin Marshall
N8	8	(Australia) Rocky Elsom
OF	7	(France) Serge Betsen
BF	6	(New Zealand) Jerry Collins
RL	5	(New Zealand) Chris Jack
LL	4	(England) Martin Corry (c)
TP	3	(New Zealand) Greg Somerville
HK	2	(South Africa) Schalk Brits
LP	1	(New Zealand) Clarke Dermody
Substitutes:
HK	16	(France) Sébastien Bruno
PR	17	(South Africa) BJ Botha
LK	18	(New Zealand) Paul Tito
FL	19	(Australia) Phil Waugh
SH	20	(Australia) Chris Whitaker
CE	21	(England) Mike Catt
WG	22	(Fiji) Ratu Nasiganiyavi
Coach:
(Wales) Dai Young

31 May 2009
13:00 PTZ (UTC-07)

United States	10–27	Ireland
Try: Suniula 65' c Con: Malifa (1/1); Drop: Malifa (1/1) 63'	Report	Try: Casey 13' m Whitten 40+2' m Penalty try 53' c Best 70' c Con: Keatley (2/4); Pen: Keatley (1/2) 24'

Buck Shaw Stadium, Santa Clara, California
Attendance: 10,000
Referee: Chris White (England)

Team details

FB	15	Chris Wyles
RW	14	Kevin Swiryn
OC	13	Junior Sifa
IC	12	Roland Suniula
LW	11	Justin Boyd
FH	10	Mike Hercus (c)
SH	9	Mike Petri
N8	8	Nic Johnson
OF	7	Peter Dahl
BF	6	Louis Stanfill
RL	5	Hayden Smith
LL	4	John van der Giessen
TP	3	Will Johnson
HK	2	Chris Biller
LP	1	Mike MacDonald
Replacements:
HK	16	Joe Welch
PR	17	Mate Moeakiola
LK	18	Courtney McKay
N8	19	JJ Gagiano
SH	20	Tim Usasz
FH	21	Ata Malifa
CE	22	Alipate Tuilevuka
Coach:
(Ireland) Eddie O'Sullivan

FB	15	Gavin Duffy
RW	14	Barry Murphy
OC	13	Darren Cave
IC	12	Ian Whitten
LW	11	Ian Dowling
FH	10	Ian Keatley
SH	9	Peter Stringer
N8	8	Denis Leamy
OF	7	Niall Ronan
BF	6	John Muldoon
RL	5	Mick O'Driscoll
LL	4	Bob Casey
TP	3	Mike Ross
HK	2	Rory Best (c)
LP	1	Tony Buckley
Replacements:
HK	16	Seán Cronin
PR	17	Tom Court
LK	18	Ryan Caldwell
LK	19	Donnacha Ryan
SH	20	Eoin Reddan
FH	21	Niall O'Connor
FB	22	Denis Hurley
Coach:
(Ireland) Declan Kidney

6 June 2009
19:30 AEST (UTC+10)

Australia	55–7	Barbarians
Try: Mitchell (2); Horwill; Giteau; Moore; Alexander; Pocock; O'Connor; Con: Giteau (4); Mortlock (2)	Report	Try: Balshaw; Con: McAlister

Sydney Football Stadium, Sydney
Attendance: 39,688
Referee: Stuart Dickinson (Australia)

FB	15	Adam Ashley-Cooper
RW	14	Lachlan Turner
OC	13	Stirling Mortlock (c)
IC	12	Berrick Barnes
LW	11	Drew Mitchell
FH	10	Matt Giteau
SH	9	Luke Burgess
N8	8	Richard Brown
OF	7	George Smith
BF	6	Matt Hodgson
RL	5	Nathan Sharpe
LL	4	James Horwill
TP	3	Al Baxter
HK	2	Stephen Moore
LP	1	Benn Robinson
Substitutions:
HK	16	Tatafu Polota-Nau
PR	17	Ben Alexander
LK	18	Dean Mumm
FL	19	David Pocock
SH	20	Josh Valentine
FH	21	Quade Cooper
CE	22	James O'Connor
Coach:
(New Zealand) Robbie Deans

FB	15	(Ireland) Geordan Murphy
RW	14	(England) Iain Balshaw
OC	13	(New Zealand) Sonny Bill Williams
IC	12	(Samoa) Seilala Mapusua
LW	11	(England) Josh Lewsey
FH	10	(New Zealand) Luke McAlister
SH	9	(Australia) Chris Whitaker
N8	8	(Australia) David Lyons
OF	7	(Australia) Phil Waugh (c)
BF	6	(New Zealand) Jerry Collins
RL	5	(New Zealand) Paul Tito
LL	4	(New Zealand) Chris Jack
TP	3	(South Africa) BJ Botha
HK	2	(France) Sébastien Bruno
LP	1	(New Zealand) Clarke Dermody
Substitutes:
HK	16	(South Africa) Schalk Brits
PR	17	(New Zealand) Greg Somerville
FL	18	(England) Martin Corry
FL	19	(France) Serge Betsen
SH	20	(New Zealand) Justin Marshall
FH	21	(New Zealand) Glen Jackson
FB	22	(New Zealand) Ben Blair
Coach:
(Wales) Dai Young

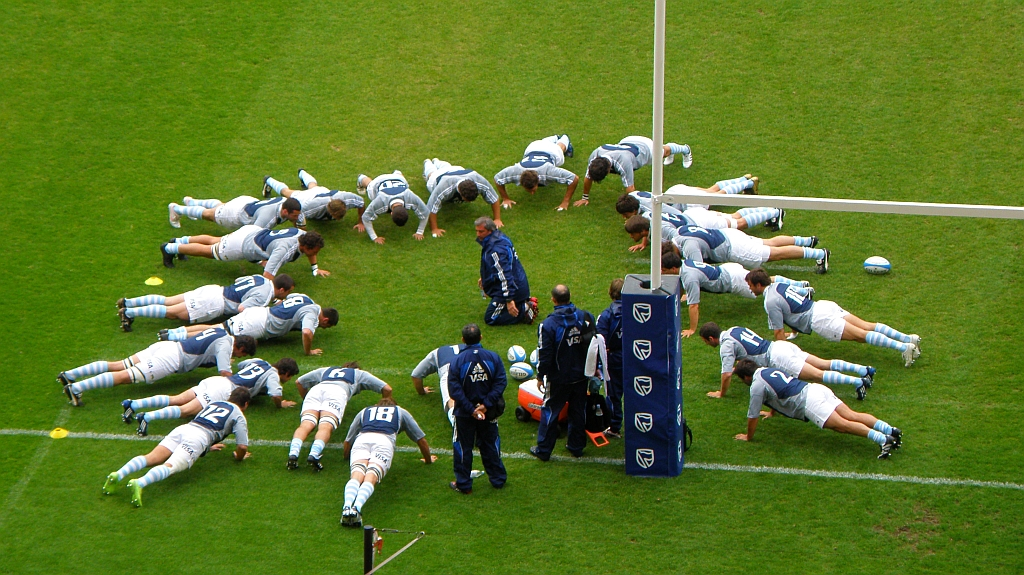
Argentina warming up at Old Trafford

6 June 2009
16:00 WEST/GMT+01 (UTC+01)

England	37–15	Argentina
Try: Banahan 25' c D. Armitage (2) 59' c, 79' m Con: Goode (2/3); Pen: Goode (4/7) 7', 21', 44', 54'; Drop: Goode (2/3) 17', 36'	Report	Pen: Hernández (4/6) 29', 38' 48', 51'; Drop: Hernández (1/1) 1'

Old Trafford, Manchester
Attendance: 40,521
Referee: Christophe Berdos (France)

FB	15	Delon Armitage
RW	14	Mark Cueto
OC	13	Dan Hipkiss
IC	12	Tom May
LW	11	Matt Banahan
FH	10	Andy Goode
SH	9	Danny Care
N8	8	Nick Easter
OF	7	Steffon Armitage
BF	6	James Haskell
RL	5	Louis Deacon
LL	4	Steve Borthwick (c)
TP	3	David Wilson
HK	2	Dylan Hartley
LP	1	Tim Payne
Substitutes:
HK	16	Steve Thompson
PR	17	Julian White
LK	18	Ben Kay
FL	19	Jordan Crane
SH	20	Paul Hodgson
FH	21	Sam Vesty
CE	22	Mathew Tait
Team Manager:
Martin Johnson

FB	15	Horacio Agulla
RW	14	Federico Martín Aramburú
OC	13	Gonzalo Tiesi
IC	12	Miguel Avramovic
LW	11	Gonzalo Camacho
FH	10	Juan Martín Hernández
SH	9	Nicolás Vergallo
N8	8	Juan Martín Fernández Lobbe (c)
OF	7	Juan Manuel Leguizamón
BF	6	Álvaro Galindo
RL	5	Patricio Albacete
LL	4	Manuel Carizza
TP	3	Juan Pablo Orlandi
HK	2	Alberto Vernet Basualdo
LP	1	Rodrigo Roncero
Substitutions:
HK	16	Eusebio Guiñazú
PR	17	Marcos Ayerza
LK	18	Esteban Lozada
FL	19	Alejandro Abadie
SH	20	Alfredo Lalanne
FH	21	Santiago Fernández
FB	22	Lucas González Amorosino
Coach:
Santiago Phelan

6 June 2009
13:00 CTZ (UTC-05)

United States	15–48	Wales
Try: Tuilevuka 53' c Gagiano 80' m Con: DeBartolo (1/2); Pen: DeBartolo (1/1) 13'	Report	Try: M. Jones 15' c Davies (2) 21' c, 79' c Penalty try 35' c T. James 62' c Cooper 70' c Con: Robinson (3/3); T. James (1/1); Biggar (2/2); Pen: Robinson (2/2) 9', 11'

Toyota Park, Bridgeview, Illinois
Attendance: 6,264
Referee: Matt Goddard (Australia)

13 June 2009
16:10 ART (UTC-03)

Argentina	24–22	England
Try: Leguizamón 2' m Camacho 42' c Con: Hernández (1/2); Pen: Hernández (3) 14', 19', 23'; Drop: Hernández (1) 70'	Report	Try: Banahan 77' c Con: Goode (1/1); Pen: Goode (5) 7', 46', 50', 56', 69'

Estadio Padre Ernesto Martearena, Salta
Attendance: 24,000
Referee: Alan Lewis (Ireland)

FB	15	Horacio Agulla
RW	14	Francisco Leonelli
OC	13	Gonzalo Tiesi
IC	12	Santiago Fernández
LW	11	Gonzalo Camacho
FH	10	Juan Martín Hernández
SH	9	Alfredo Lalanne
N8	8	Juan Martín Fernández Lobbe (c)
OF	7	Juan Manuel Leguizamón
BF	6	Genaro Fessia
RL	5	Patricio Albacete
LL	4	Rimas Álvarez Kairelis
TP	3	Marcos Ayerza
HK	2	Mario Ledesma
LP	1	Rodrigo Roncero
Substitutions:
HK	16	Alberto Vernet Basualdo
PR	17	Juan Pablo Orlandi
LK	18	Esteban Lozada
LK	19	Manuel Carizza
SH	20	Nicolás Vergallo
CE	21	Miguel Avramovic
FB	22	Lucas González Amorosino
Coach:
Santiago Phelan

FB	15	Delon Armitage
RW	14	Mark Cueto
OC	13	Dan Hipkiss
IC	12	Tom May
LW	11	Matt Banahan
FH	10	Andy Goode
SH	9	Danny Care
N8	8	Nick Easter
OF	7	Steffon Armitage
BF	6	Chris Robshaw
RL	5	Louis Deacon
LL	4	Steve Borthwick (c)
TP	3	Julian White
HK	2	Dylan Hartley
LP	1	Tim Payne
Substitutes:
HK	16	George Chuter
PR	17	David Wilson
LK	18	Ben Kay
FL	19	James Haskell
SH	20	Paul Hodgson
FH	21	Sam Vesty
CE	22	Mathew Tait
Team Manager:
Martin Johnson

13 June 2009
19:30 AEST (UTC+10)

Australia	31–8	Italy
Try: O'Connor (3) 3' m, 28' m, 58' c Giteau 33' c Mortlock 47' c Con: Giteau (3/5)	Report	Try: Robertson 42' m Pen: McLean (1/1) 40+1'

Canberra Stadium, Canberra
Attendance: 22,468
Referee: Romain Poite (France)

FB	15	James O'Connor
RW	14	Lachlan Turner
OC	13	Stirling Mortlock (c)
IC	12	Berrick Barnes
LW	11	Drew Mitchell
FH	10	Matt Giteau
SH	9	Luke Burgess
N8	8	Richard Brown
OF	7	George Smith
BF	6	Dean Mumm
RL	5	Nathan Sharpe
LL	4	James Horwill
TP	3	Al Baxter
HK	2	Stephen Moore
LP	1	Benn Robinson
Substitutions:
HK	16	Tatafu Polota-Nau
PR	17	Ben Alexander
LK	18	Peter Kimlin
FL	19	David Pocock
SH	20	Josh Valentine
FH	21	Quade Cooper
CE	22	Adam Ashley-Cooper
Coach:
(New Zealand) Robbie Deans

FB	15	Luke McLean
RW	14	Kaine Robertson
OC	13	Mirco Bergamasco
IC	12	Matteo Pratichetti
LW	11	Alberto Sgarbi
FH	10	Craig Gower
SH	9	Pablo Canavosio
N8	8	Sergio Parisse (c)
OF	7	Mauro Bergamasco
BF	6	Alessandro Zanni
RL	5	Carlo Del Fava
LL	4	Quintin Geldenhuys
TP	3	Fabio Staibano
HK	2	Leonardo Ghiraldini
LP	1	Salvatore Perugini
Substitutes:
HK	16	Franco Sbaraglini
PR	17	Ignacio Rouyet
LK	18	Marco Bortolami
FL	19	Paul Derbyshire
SH	20	Tito Tebaldi
FH	21	Kris Burton
CE	22	Gonzalo Garcia
Coach:
(South Africa) Nick Mallett

13 June 2009
19:35 NZST (UTC+12)

New Zealand	22–27	France
Try: Messam 40' m Nonu 75' m Pen: Donald (4/5) 12', 39', 49', 57'	Report	Try: Trinh-Duc 17' c Servat 27' c Médard 70' c Con: Dupuy (3/3); Pen: Dupuy (2/3) 3', 66'

Carisbrook, Dunedin
Attendance: 32,000
Referee: George Clancy (Ireland)

FB	15	Mils Muliaina (c)
RW	14	Cory Jane
OC	13	Isaia Toeava
IC	12	Ma'a Nonu
LW	11	Joe Rokocoko
FH	10	Stephen Donald
SH	9	Jimmy Cowan
N8	8	Liam Messam
OF	7	Adam Thomson
BF	6	Kieran Read
RL	5	Isaac Ross
LL	4	Brad Thorn
TP	3	Neemia Tialata
HK	2	Andrew Hore
LP	1	Tony Woodcock
Substitutions:
HK	16	Keven Mealamu
PR	17	John Afoa
LK	18	Bryn Evans
FL	19	Tanerau Latimer
SH	20	Piri Weepu
FH	21	Luke McAlister
WG	22	Lelia Masaga
Coach:
Graham Henry

FB	15	Maxime Médard
RW	14	Cédric Heymans
OC	13	Mathieu Bastareaud
IC	12	Damien Traille
LW	11	Vincent Clerc
FH	10	François Trinh-Duc
SH	9	Julien Dupuy
N8	8	Louis Picamoles
OF	7	Fulgence Ouedraogo
BF	6	Thierry Dusautoir (c)
RL	5	Romain Millo-Chluski
LL	4	Pascal Papé
TP	3	Sylvain Marconnet
HK	2	William Servat
LP	1	Fabien Barcella
Substitutes:
HK	16	Dimitri Szarzewski
PR	17	Thomas Domingo
N8	18	Sébastien Chabal
FL	19	Rémy Martin
SH	20	Dimitri Yachvili
CE	21	Yannick Jauzion
FB	22	Alexis Palisson
Coach:
Marc Lièvremont

20 June 2009
16:00 ART (UTC-03)

Argentina	32–18	French Barbarians
Try: Leguizamón 40' m Fernández 41' m Camacho 63' c Con: Hernández (1/3); Pen: Hernández (5) 6', 16', 19', 23', 28'	Report	Try: Tomiki 52' c Gobelet 80' m Con: Mélé (1/2); Pen: Mélé 44'; Drop: Mélé 25'

José Amalfitani Stadium, Buenos Aires
Referee: Federico Cuesta (Argentina)

FB	15	Lucas González Amorosino
RW	14	Lucas Borges
OC	13	Gonzalo Tiesi
IC	12	Santiago Fernández
LW	11	Gonzalo Camacho
FH	10	Juan Martín Hernández
SH	9	Alfredo Lalanne
N8	8	Juan Martín Fernández Lobbe (c)
OF	7	Juan Manuel Leguizamón
BF	6	Genaro Fessia
RL	5	Patricio Albacete
LL	4	Rimas Álvarez Kairelis
TP	3	Marcos Ayerza
HK	2	Mario Ledesma
LP	1	Rodrigo Roncero
Substitutions:
HK	16	Alberto Vernet Basualdo
HK	17	Eusebio Guiñazú
LK	18	Esteban Lozada
FL	19	Álvaro Galindo
SH	20	Nicolás Vergallo
CE	21	Federico Martín Aramburú
FB	22	Mauro Comuzzi
Coach:
Santiago Phelan

FB	15	Nicolas Brusque
RW	14	Jean-Baptiste Gobelet
OC	13	Geoffroy Messina
IC	12	Brian Liebenberg
LW	11	Yves Donguy
FH	10	David Mélé
SH	9	Nicolas Durand
N8	8	Florian Faure
OF	7	Yannick Nyanga
BF	6	Leiataua Tomiki
RL	5	Matthias Rolland
LL	4	David Auradou (c)
TP	3	David Attoub
HK	2	Benoît August
LP	1	Arnauld Tchougong
Substitutes:
HK	16	Mathieu Blin
PR	17	Jean-Baptiste Poux
LK	18	Grégory Lamboley
FL	19	Marc Giraud
FH	20	Sébastien Fauqué
WG	21	Jean-Baptiste Peyras
WG	22	Julien Saubade
Coach:
Guy Novès

20 June 2009
20:00 AEST (UTC+10)

Australia	34–12	Italy
Try: Polota-Nau 10' m Cross 25' c Ashley-Cooper (2) 38' m, 75' c Turner 69' c Con: O'Connor (2/4); Barnes (1/1); Pen: O'Connor (1/1) 23'	Report	Pen: McLean (4/6) 2', 30', 45', 62'

Docklands Stadium, Melbourne
Attendance: 20,280
Referee: Dave Pearson (England)

FB	15	James O'Connor
RW	14	Lachlan Turner
OC	13	Ryan Cross
IC	12	Quade Cooper
LW	11	Peter Hynes
FH	10	Berrick Barnes
SH	9	Luke Burgess
N8	8	George Smith (c)
OF	7	David Pocock
BF	6	Peter Kimlin
RL	5	Dean Mumm
LL	4	James Horwill
TP	3	Ben Alexander
HK	2	Tatafu Polota-Nau
LP	1	Pekahou Cowan
Substitutions:
HK	16	Stephen Moore
PR	17	Benn Robinson
LK	18	Nathan Sharpe
FL	19	Phil Waugh
SH	20	Josh Valentine
FH	21	Matt Giteau
CE	22	Adam Ashley-Cooper
Coach:
(New Zealand) Robbie Deans

FB	15	Luke McLean
RW	14	Giulio Rubini
OC	13	Gonzalo Canale
IC	12	Gonzalo Garcia
LW	11	Alberto Sgarbi
FH	10	Craig Gower
SH	9	Tito Tebaldi
N8	8	Sergio Parisse (c)
OF	7	Simone Favaro
BF	6	Jean-François Montauriol
RL	5	Marco Bortolami
LL	4	Tommaso Reato
TP	3	Fabio Staibano
HK	2	Franco Sbaraglini
LP	1	Matías Agüero
Substitutes:
HK	16	Leonardo Ghiraldini
PR	17	Salvatore Perugini
LK	18	Quintin Geldenhuys
FL	19	Alessandro Zanni
SH	20	Giulio Toniolatti
FH	21	Kris Burton
CE	22	Roberto Quartaroli
Coach:
(South Africa) Nick Mallett

20 June 2009
19:35 NZST (UTC+12)

New Zealand	14–10	France
Try: Nonu 25' m Pen: Donald (2/4) 39', 56'; McAlister (1/1) 65'	Report	Try: Heymans 44' c Con: Dupuy (1/1); Pen: Yachvili (1/2) 67'

Wellington Regional Stadium, Wellington
Attendance: 29,394
Referee: Marius Jonker (South Africa)

FB	15	Mils Muliaina (c)
RW	14	Cory Jane
OC	13	Conrad Smith
IC	12	Ma'a Nonu
LW	11	Joe Rokocoko
FH	10	Stephen Donald
SH	9	Jimmy Cowan
N8	8	Kieran Read
OF	7	Tanerau Latimer
BF	6	Jerome Kaino
RL	5	Isaac Ross
LL	4	Brad Thorn
TP	3	Neemia Tialata
HK	2	Keven Mealamu
LP	1	Tony Woodcock
Substitutions:
HK	16	Aled de Malmanche
PR	17	John Afoa
LK	18	Bryn Evans
FL	19	George Whitelock
SH	20	Piri Weepu
FH	21	Luke McAlister
CE	22	Isaia Toeava
Coach:
Graham Henry

FB	15	Maxime Médard
RW	14	Cédric Heymans
OC	13	Maxime Mermoz
IC	12	Damien Traille
LW	11	Vincent Clerc
FH	10	François Trinh-Duc
SH	9	Julien Dupuy
N8	8	Louis Picamoles
OF	7	Fulgence Ouedraogo
BF	6	Thierry Dusautoir (c)
RL	5	Romain Millo-Chluski
LL	4	Sébastien Chabal
TP	3	Nicolas Mas
HK	2	William Servat
LP	1	Fabien Barcella
Substitutes:
HK	16	Dimitri Szarzewski
PR	17	Thomas Domingo
FL	18	Rémy Martin
N8	19	Damien Chouly
SH	20	Dimitri Yachvili
CE	21	Yannick Jauzion
CE	22	Mathieu Bastareaud
Coach:
Marc Lièvremont

20 June 2009
15:00 SAST (UTC+02)

South Africa	26–21	British & Irish Lions
Try: Smit 5' c Brüssow 46' c Con: Pienaar (2/2); Pen: Pienaar (3/4) 9', 31', 34'; F. Steyn (1/2) 19'	Report	Try: Croft (2) 23' c, 68' c Phillips 75' c Con: S. Jones (3/3)

Kings Park Stadium, Durban
Attendance: 47,813
Referee: Bryce Lawrence (New Zealand)

FB	15	François Steyn
RW	14	JP Pietersen
OC	13	Adrian Jacobs
IC	12	Jean de Villiers
LW	11	Bryan Habana
FH	10	Ruan Pienaar
SH	9	Fourie du Preez
N8	8	Pierre Spies
OF	7	Juan Smith
BF	6	Heinrich Brüssow
RL	5	Victor Matfield
LL	4	Bakkies Botha
TP	3	John Smit (c)
HK	2	Bismarck du Plessis
LP	1	Tendai Mtawarira
Substitutions:
HK	16	Gurthro Steenkamp
PR	17	Deon Carstens
LK	18	Andries Bekker
FL	19	Danie Rossouw
SH	20	Ricky Januarie
CE	21	Jaque Fourie
FH	22	Morné Steyn
Coach:
Peter de Villiers

FB	15	(Wales) Lee Byrne
RW	14	(Ireland) Tommy Bowe
OC	13	(Ireland) Brian O'Driscoll
IC	12	(Wales) Jamie Roberts
LW	11	(England) Ugo Monye
FH	10	(Wales) Stephen Jones
SH	9	(Wales) Mike Phillips
N8	8	(Ireland) Jamie Heaslip
OF	7	(Ireland) David Wallace
BF	6	(England) Tom Croft
RL	5	(Ireland) Paul O'Connell (c)
LL	4	(Wales) Alun Wyn Jones
TP	3	(England) Phil Vickery
HK	2	(England) Lee Mears
LP	1	(Wales) Gethin Jenkins
Substitutes:
HK	16	(Wales) Matthew Rees
PR	17	(Wales) Adam Jones
LK	18	(Ireland) Donncha O'Callaghan
FL	19	(Wales) Martyn Williams
SH	20	(England) Harry Ellis
FH	21	(Ireland) Ronan O'Gara
FB	22	(Ireland) Rob Kearney
Manager:
(Scotland) Ian McGeechan

27 June 2009
20:05 AEST (UTC+10)

Australia	22–6	France
Try: Giteau 17' c Con: Giteau (1/1); Pen: Giteau (5/6) 26', 42', 45', 51', 55'	Report	Pen: Beauxis (1/2) 20'; Yachvili (1/1) 60'

Stadium Australia, Sydney
Attendance: 43,588
Referee: Dave Pearson (England)

FB	15	Adam Ashley-Cooper
RW	14	Lachlan Turner
OC	13	Stirling Mortlock (c)
IC	12	Berrick Barnes
LW	11	Drew Mitchell
FH	10	Matt Giteau
SH	9	Luke Burgess
N8	8	Richard Brown
OF	7	George Smith
BF	6	Dean Mumm
RL	5	Nathan Sharpe
LL	4	James Horwill
TP	3	Al Baxter
HK	2	Stephen Moore
LP	1	Benn Robinson
Substitutions:
HK	16	Tatafu Polota-Nau
PR	17	Ben Alexander
FL	18	Phil Waugh
FL	19	David Pocock
SH	20	Josh Valentine
CE	21	Ryan Cross
CE	22	James O'Connor
Coach:
(New Zealand) Robbie Deans

FB	15	Damien Traille
RW	14	Maxime Médard
OC	13	Florian Fritz
IC	12	Maxime Mermoz
LW	11	Cédric Heymans
FH	10	Lionel Beauxis
SH	9	Dimitri Yachvili
N8	8	Julien Puricelli
OF	7	Fulgence Ouedraogo
BF	6	Thierry Dusautoir (c)
RL	5	Romain Millo-Chluski
LL	4	Pascal Papé
TP	3	Sylvain Marconnet
HK	2	Dimitri Szarzewski
LP	1	Fabien Barcella
Substitutes:
HK	16	Guilhem Guirado
PR	17	Nicolas Mas
FL	18	Rémy Martin
N8	19	Damien Chouly
SH	20	Julien Dupuy
WG	21	Vincent Clerc
WG	22	Julien Arias
Coach:
Marc Lièvremont

27 June 2009
19:35 NZST (UTC+12)

New Zealand	27–6	Italy
Try: Rokocoko 23' c Ross 56' c Whitelock 68' c Con: McAlister (3/3); Pen: McAlister (2/2) 8', 27'	Report	Pen: McLean (2/4) 32', 54'

Lancaster Park, Christchurch
Attendance: 19,000
Referee: George Clancy (Ireland)

FB	15	Mils Muliaina (c)
RW	14	Lelia Masaga
OC	13	Isaia Toeava
IC	12	Ma'a Nonu
LW	11	Joe Rokocoko
FH	10	Luke McAlister
SH	9	Brendon Leonard
N8	8	Kieran Read
OF	7	Tanerau Latimer
BF	6	Jerome Kaino
RL	5	Isaac Ross
LL	4	Brad Thorn
TP	3	John Afoa
HK	2	Keven Mealamu
LP	1	Wyatt Crockett
Substitutions:
HK	16	Aled de Malmanche
PR	17	Tony Woodcock
PR	18	Owen Franks
LK	19	Bryn Evans
FL	20	George Whitelock
SH	21	Piri Weepu
WG	22	Cory Jane
Coach:
Graham Henry

FB	15	Luke McLean
RW	14	Kaine Robertson
OC	13	Gonzalo Canale
IC	12	Gonzalo Garcia
LW	11	Mirco Bergamasco
FH	10	Craig Gower
SH	9	Tito Tebaldi
N8	8	Sergio Parisse (c)
OF	7	Mauro Bergamasco
BF	6	Alessandro Zanni
RL	5	Marco Bortolami
LL	4	Quintin Geldenhuys
TP	3	Ignacio Rouyet
HK	2	Leonardo Ghiraldini
LP	1	Salvatore Perugini
Substitutes:
HK	16	Franco Sbaraglini
PR	17	Fabio Staibano
LK	18	Carlo Del Fava
FL	19	Simone Favaro
SH	20	Giulio Toniolatti
FH	21	Kris Burton
CE	22	Matteo Pratichetti
Coach:
(South Africa) Nick Mallett

27 June 2009
15:00 SAST (UTC+02)

South Africa	28–25	British & Irish Lions
Try: Pietersen 12' m Habana 63' c Fourie 74' c Con: M. Steyn (2/2); Pen: F. Steyn (1/2) 40+1'; M. Steyn (2/2) 67', 80+1'	Report	Try: Kearney 7' c Con: S. Jones (1/1); Pen: S. Jones (5/5) 2', 15', 59', 65', 76'; Drop: S. Jones (1/1) 35'

Loftus Versfeld Stadium, Pretoria
Attendance: 52,000
Referee: Christophe Berdos (France)

FB	15	François Steyn
RW	14	JP Pietersen
OC	13	Adrian Jacobs
IC	12	Jean de Villiers
LW	11	Bryan Habana
FH	10	Ruan Pienaar
SH	9	Fourie du Preez
N8	8	Pierre Spies
BF	7	Juan Smith
OF	6	Schalk Burger
RL	5	Victor Matfield
LL	4	Bakkies Botha
TP	3	John Smit (c)
HK	2	Bismarck du Plessis
LP	1	Tendai Mtawarira
Substitutes:
HK	16	Chiliboy Ralepelle
PR	17	Deon Carstens
LK	18	Andries Bekker
N8	19	Danie Rossouw
FL	20	Heinrich Brüssow
CE	21	Jaque Fourie
FH	22	Morné Steyn
Coach:
Peter de Villiers

FB	15	(Ireland) Rob Kearney
RW	14	(Ireland) Tommy Bowe
OC	13	(Ireland) Brian O'Driscoll
IC	12	(Wales) Jamie Roberts
LW	11	(Ireland) Luke Fitzgerald
FH	10	(Wales) Stephen Jones
SH	9	(Wales) Mike Phillips
N8	8	(Ireland) Jamie Heaslip
OF	7	(Ireland) David Wallace
BF	6	(England) Tom Croft
RL	5	(Ireland) Paul O'Connell (c)
LL	4	(England) Simon Shaw
TP	3	(Wales) Adam Jones
HK	2	(Wales) Matthew Rees
LP	1	(Wales) Gethin Jenkins
Substitutes:
HK	16	(Scotland) Ross Ford
PR	17	(England) Andrew Sheridan
LK	18	(Wales) Alun Wyn Jones
FL	19	(Wales) Martyn Williams
SH	20	(England) Harry Ellis
FH	21	(Ireland) Ronan O'Gara
WG	22	(Wales) Shane Williams
Manager:
(Scotland) Ian McGeechan

4 July 2009
15:00 SAST (UTC+02)

South Africa	9–28	British & Irish Lions
Pen: M. Steyn (3/3) 12', 40+1', 68'	Report	Try: S. Williams (2) 25' m, 33' c Monye 54' c Con: S. Jones (2/3); Pen: S. Jones (3/4) 9', 72', 73'

Ellis Park Stadium, Johannesburg
Attendance: 58,318
Referee: Stuart Dickinson (Australia)

FB	15	Zane Kirchner
RW	14	Odwa Ndungane
OC	13	Jaque Fourie
IC	12	Wynand Olivier
LW	11	Jongi Nokwe
FH	10	Morné Steyn
SH	9	Fourie du Preez
N8	8	Ryan Kankowski
BF	7	Juan Smith
OF	6	Heinrich Brüssow
RL	5	Victor Matfield
LL	4	Johann Muller
TP	3	John Smit (c)
HK	2	Chiliboy Ralepelle
LP	1	Tendai Mtawarira
Substitutes:
HK	16	Bismarck du Plessis
PR	17	Gurthro Steenkamp
PR	18	Deon Carstens
LK	19	Steven Sykes
N8	20	Pierre Spies
FH	21	Ruan Pienaar
FB	22	François Steyn
Coach:
Peter de Villiers

FB	15	(Ireland) Rob Kearney
RW	14	(England) Ugo Monye
OC	13	(Ireland) Tommy Bowe
IC	12	(England) Riki Flutey
LW	11	(Wales) Shane Williams
FH	10	(Wales) Stephen Jones
SH	9	(Wales) Mike Phillips
N8	8	(Ireland) Jamie Heaslip
OF	7	(Wales) Martyn Williams
BF	6	(England) Joe Worsley
RL	5	(Ireland) Paul O'Connell (c)
LL	4	(England) Simon Shaw
TP	3	(England) Phil Vickery
HK	2	(Wales) Matthew Rees
LP	1	(England) Andrew Sheridan
Substitutes:
HK	16	(Scotland) Ross Ford
PR	17	(Ireland) John Hayes
LK	18	(Wales) Alun Wyn Jones
FL	19	(Ireland) David Wallace
FL	20	(England) Tom Croft
SH	21	(England) Harry Ellis
FH	22	(Wales) James Hook
Manager:
(Scotland) Ian McGeechan

== See also ==
- Mid-year rugby union test series
- 2009 end-of-year rugby union tests
- 2009 British & Irish Lions tour to South Africa
- 2009 Asian Five Nations
- 2009 IRB Churchill Cup
- 2009 IRB Pacific Nations Cup
- 2009 IRB Nations Cup
