= 2009 Wales rugby union tour of North America =

- Date: 30 May – 6 June 2009
- Coach: Robin McBryde (caretaker)
- Tour captain: Ryan Jones
Summary
P	W	D	L
Total
2	2	0	0
Test match
2	2	0	0
Opponent
P	W	D	L
Canada
1	1	0	0
United States
1	1	0	0

Tour chronology
- ← South Africa 2008 New Zealand 2010 →

In 2009, the Wales national rugby union team toured North America to play tests against Canada and the United States. They won both matches, beating Canada 32–23 in Toronto on 30 May, before a 48–15 win over the United States in Chicago on 6 June. Wales travelled with an inexperienced touring party due to several senior players being included in the British & Irish Lions' squad for their tour to South Africa. Five players earned their first Wales caps on the tour, including future captain Sam Warburton and centre Jonathan Davies.

== Squads ==
=== Wales ===
With head coach Warren Gatland and attack coach Rob Howley on the 2009 British & Irish Lions tour to South Africa, forwards coach Robin McBryde was named as coach for Wales' tour of North America. Captain Ryan Jones was a surprise omission from the Lions squad, so he was able to continue as captain for Wales' tour. He was named to lead a 32-man squad that included 11 uncapped players, given opportunities by the selection of 13 Wales players in the Lions squad. After James Hook was called up to the Lions tour, Sonny Parker was added to the Wales touring party. Prop Eifion Lewis-Roberts dropped out of the tour due to a knee ligament injury and was replaced by Paul James, while full-back Dan Evans was called up to replace Gareth Owen, who suffered an Achilles injury. The squad was finally reduced to 26 with the dropping of Scarlets flanker Rob McCusker and Blues wing Richard Mustoe, in addition to the unavailability of Dragons players Luke Charteris, Lewis Evans, Dan Lydiate and Jason Tovey due to their involvement in a Heineken Cup play-off. Charteris rejoined the squad for the second match against the United States after Bradley Davies suffered an injury.

Name	Position	Club	Notes
Richard Hibbard	Hooker	Ospreys	
Gareth Williams	Hooker	Cardiff Blues	
Paul James	Prop	Ospreys	Replaced Eifion Lewis-Roberts due to injury
Duncan Jones	Prop	Ospreys	
Eifion Lewis-Roberts	Prop	Sale Sharks	Withdrew due to injury
Craig Mitchell	Prop	Ospreys	
John Yapp	Prop	Cardiff Blues	
Luke Charteris	Lock	Newport Gwent Dragons	Unavailable due to club commitments; rejoined squad for United States match
Bradley Davies	Lock	Cardiff Blues	
Ian Gough	Lock	Ospreys	
Deiniol Jones	Lock	Cardiff Blues	
Lewis Evans	Back row	Newport Gwent Dragons	Unavailable due to club commitments
Dafydd Jones	Back row	Scarlets	
Ryan Jones	Back row	Ospreys	Captain
Dan Lydiate	Back row	Newport Gwent Dragons	Unavailable due to club commitments
Rob McCusker	Back row	Scarlets	Dropped prior to tour
Robin Sowden-Taylor	Back row	Cardiff Blues	
Josh Turnbull	Back row	Scarlets	
Sam Warburton	Back row	Cardiff Blues	
Gareth Cooper	Scrum-half	Gloucester	
Dwayne Peel	Scrum-half	Sale Sharks	
Dan Biggar	Fly-half	Ospreys	
Nicky Robinson	Fly-half	Cardiff Blues	
Andrew Bishop	Centre	Ospreys	
Jonathan Davies	Centre	Scarlets	
James Hook	Centre	Ospreys	
Sonny Parker	Centre	Ospreys	
Jonathan Spratt	Centre	Ospreys	
Chris Czekaj	Wing	Cardiff Blues	
Tom James	Wing	Cardiff Blues	
Mark Jones	Wing	Scarlets	
Richard Mustoe	Wing	Cardiff Blues	Dropped prior to tour
Dan Evans	Full-back	Scarlets	Replaced Gareth Owen due to injury
Gareth Owen	Full-back	Ospreys	Withdrew due to injury
Jason Tovey	Full-back	Newport Gwent Dragons	Unavailable due to club commitments

=== Canada ===
Canada head coach Kieran Crowley named a 31-man squad for their games against Wales and Ireland, and for the Churchill Cup. The squad included uncapped forwards Chauncey O'Toole and Andrew Tiedemann, while centre Dave Spicer and former Wales under-21 lock Luke Tait were among those returning from injury.

Name	Position	Club	Notes
Aaron Carpenter	Hooker	Brantford Harlequins	
Pat Riordan	Hooker	University of Victoria	Captain
Scott Franklin	Prop	Cornish Pirates	
Mike Pletch	Prop	Velox Valhallians	
Andrew Tiedemann	Prop	University of Victoria	
Kevin Tkachuk	Prop	Glasgow Warriors	
Frank Walsh	Prop	Vandals	
Doug Wooldridge	Prop	Cowichan	
Mike Burak	Lock	Cornish Pirates	
Jamie Cudmore	Lock	Clermont Auvergne	
Tyler Hotson	Lock	UBC Old Boys Ravens	
Luke Tait	Lock	Mont-de-Marsan	
Nanyak Dala	Back row	Castaway Wanderers	
Adam Kleeberger	Back row	University of Victoria	
Stan McKeen	Back row	Oxford University	
Chauncey O'Toole	Back row	University of Victoria	
Jebb Sinclair	Back row	Castaway Wanderers	
Sean-Michael Stephen	Back row	Plymouth Albion	
Ed Fairhurst	Scrum-half	Cornish Pirates	
Phil Mack	Scrum-half	James Bay AA	
Ander Monro	Fly-half	Colorno	
Ryan Smith	Fly-half	Calgary Irish	
Sean Duke	Centre	University of Victoria	
Ciaran Hearn	Centre	Castaway Wanderers	
Bryn Keys	Centre	Velox Valhallians	
Dave Spicer	Centre	University of Victoria	
Justin Mensah-Coker	Wing	Plymouth Albion	
Dean van Camp	Wing	Velox Valhallians	
D. T. H. van der Merwe	Wing	James Bay AA	
Matt Evans	Full-back	Hartpury College	
James Pritchard	Full-back	Bedford Blues	

=== United States ===
Following the appointment of former head coach Scott Johnson as director of coaching at the Ospreys, the United States signed Eddie O'Sullivan to a two-year contract through the 2011 Rugby World Cup. O'Sullivan had served as Ireland's head coach from 2002 to 2008, and was also the United States' forwards coach from 1997 to 1999. O'Sullivan named a 28-man squad for the visits of Ireland and Wales; he was unable to call on 13 players due to injury and unavailability, including captain Todd Clever and experienced centre Paul Emerick, but the squad still contained five players who featured in the 2007 Rugby World Cup and only four uncapped players. The original squad contained only one hooker and one scrum-half, but hookers Brian McClenahan and Joe Welch, and scrum-half Tim Usasz were added before the series.

Name	Position	Club	Notes
Chris Biller	Hooker	University of California	
Brian McClenahan	Hooker	Olympic Club	Late addition
Joe Welch	Hooker	Belmont Shore	Late addition
Will Johnson	Prop	Oxford University	
Mike MacDonald	Prop	Leeds Carnegie	
Matekitonga Moeakiola	Prop	Park City Haggis	
Shawn Pittman	Prop	Bayside Sharks	
Pat Danahy	Lock	Dublin University	
Courtney Mackay	Lock	Counties Manukau	
Samu Manoa	Lock	San Francisco Golden Gate	
Hayden Smith	Lock	Saracens	
John van der Giessen	Lock	Denver Barbarians	
Peter Dahl	Back row	Belmont Shore	
Scott LaValla	Back row	Dublin University	
Louis Stanfill	Back row	New York Athletic Club	
JJ Gagiano	Back row	University of Cape Town	
Nic Johnson	Back row	Denver Barbarians	
Mike Petri	Scrum-half	New York Athletic Club	
Tim Usasz	Scrum-half	Nottingham	Late addition
Taivalu Enosa	Fly-half	Tempe	
Mike Hercus	Fly-half	Sunshine Coast	Captain
Ata Malifa	Fly-half	Belmont Shore	
Junior Sifa	Centre	Midleton	
Roland Suniula	Centre	Pearl City	
Alipate Tuilevuka	Centre	Provo Steelers	
Justin Boyd	Wing	Dallas Harlequins	
Takudzwa Ngwenya	Wing	Biarritz	
Salesi Sika	Wing	Agen	
Kevin Swiryn	Wing	OPSB	
Gavin DeBartolo	Full-back	Eastern Suburbs	
Chris Wyles	Full-back	Saracens	

== Matches ==
=== Canada v Wales ===
McBryde named an inexperienced team for Wales' opening match against Canada; aside from scrum-half Gareth Cooper, the backs had just 10 caps between them, with debuts for Scarlets centre Jonathan Davies and full-back Dan Evans. Three more uncapped players were named on the bench in prop Craig Mitchell, flanker Sam Warburton and centre Jonathan Spratt. Early penalties from James Pritchard gave Canada a 6–0 lead inside the opening quarter of an hour, but a try from Chris Czekaj, making his first Wales appearance for almost two years, was converted by Dan Biggar to put Wales in front at the midway point of the half. After Canada lock Luke Tait was sent to the sin bin for killing the ball, Biggar then kicked three penalties before the end of the half, sandwiching another from Pritchard, to give Wales a 16–9 lead at the break. Cooper was injured in an unsuccessful try-scoring attempt just before half-time and replaced by Dwayne Peel for the second half. A try from Sean Duke, converted by Pritchard, levelled the scores early in the second half, only for Tom James to put Wales back in front with another converted try, before Biggar stretched Wales' lead with another two penalties shortly afterwards. A try by Ed Fairhurst, converted by Pritchard, narrowed the deficit to 29–23 just before the hour mark, but a penalty from Biggar put Wales nine points ahead with eight minutes to play. In the final quarter, Wales brought on Mitchell and Spratt for their first appearances, but Warburton was made to wait.

30 May 2009
14:45 EDT

Canada	23–32	Wales
Try: Duke 42' c Fairhurst 58' c Con: Pritchard (2) 43', 59'; Pen: Pritchard (3) 9', 14', 30'	Report	Try: Czekaj 16' c James 48' c Con: Biggar (2) 17', 49'; Pen: Biggar (6) 21', 27', 33', 53', 56', 72'

York Stadium, Toronto
Attendance: 8,450
Referee: Matt Goddard (Australia)

FB	15	James Pritchard
RW	14	Ciaran Hearn
OC	13	D. T. H. van der Merwe
IC	12	Ryan Smith
LW	11	Sean Duke		(substituted off) 62'
FH	10	Ander Monro		(substituted off) 40'
SH	9	Ed Fairhurst		(substituted off) 74'
N8	8	Aaron Carpenter
OF	7	Adam Kleeberger
BF	6	Nanyak Dala		(substituted off) 69'
RL	5	Luke Tait	(yellow card) 21'	(substituted off) 61'
LL	4	Mike Burak
TP	3	Andrew Tiedemann		(substituted off) 60'
HK	2	Pat Riordan (c)
LP	1	Kevin Tkachuk
Replacements:
HK	16	Mike Pletch		(substituted on) 60'
PR	17	Doug Wooldridge		(substituted on) 69'
LK	18	Tyler Hotson		(substituted on) 61'
FL	19	Sean-Michael Stephen		(substituted on) 40'
SH	20	Matt Evans		(substituted on) 74'
FH	21	Dave Spicer		(substituted on) 62'
CE	22	Phil Mack
Coach:
(New Zealand) Kieran Crowley

FB	15	Dan Evans
RW	14	Tom James
OC	13	Jonathan Davies	(substituted off) 73'
IC	12	Andrew Bishop
LW	11	Chris Czekaj
FH	10	Dan Biggar
SH	9	Gareth Cooper	(substituted off) 40'
N8	8	Ryan Jones (c)
OF	7	Robin Sowden-Taylor
BF	6	Dafydd Jones
RL	5	Deiniol Jones
LL	4	Bradley Davies
TP	3	John Yapp	(substituted off) 61'
HK	2	Richard Hibbard	(substituted off) 76'
LP	1	Duncan Jones
Replacements:
HK	16	Gareth Williams	(substituted on) 76'
PR	17	Craig Mitchell	(substituted on) 61'
LK	18	Ian Gough
FL	19	Sam Warburton
SH	20	Dwayne Peel	(substituted on) 40'
FH	21	Nicky Robinson
CE	22	Jonathan Spratt	(substituted on) 73'
Coach:
(Wales) Robin McBryde

=== United States v Wales ===
The match against the United States was Wales' 600th test match. Despite scoring a try in the previous match, Wales wing Chris Czekaj was dropped to make room for Mark Jones, who had missed the Canada game due to injury. McBryde also replaced both half-backs, with Peel and Nicky Robinson coming in for Cooper and Biggar; in the forwards, hooker Gareth Williams replaced Richard Hibbard, while Ian Gough started in the second row in place of Bradley Davies, who had chipped a bone in his neck; Dragons lock Luke Charteris came onto the bench after joining the tour late, leaving Scarlets flanker Josh Turnbull and Ospreys centre Sonny Parker as the only touring players not to make an appearance in either match. For the United States, coach Eddie O'Sullivan dropped former Scarlets and Dragons fly-half Mike Hercus, and replaced him with Ata Malifa.

Nicky Robinson opened the scoring for Wales with a pair of penalties either side of the 10 minute mark, his first points for Wales in almost three years, but United States wing Gavin DeBartolo responded with one of his own a couple of minutes later. Those were to be the United States' only points of the first half, though, and Wales opened up a 27–3 half-time lead. Captain Ryan Jones went off midway through the half, having failed to recover from a head injury suffered in the opening seconds of the match, replaced by debutant Sam Warburton, but tries from Scarlets Mark Jones and Jonathan Davies (his first in international rugby) put Wales 20–3 up with 22 minutes gone. Another Wales back-rower Robin Sowden-Taylor had to be substituted before half an hour had been played, forcing Hibbard into taking over in an unfamiliar position. United States flanker Louis Stanfill was sent to the sin bin for pulling down a maul shortly afterwards, and Wales took advantage of their numerical superiority, forcing the Americans into conceding a penalty try. The United States reduced the deficit to 17 points with the first score of the second half, a try from Alipate Tuilevuka that was converted by DeBartolo, but Tom James restored Wales' lead with a try just past the midway point of the half. James suffered an injury with just over 10 minutes left to play; Cooper came on in his place and scored almost immediately before Davies scored his second try of the game, making JJ Gagiano's late try mere consolation. James and Ryan Jones were sent for scans on their injuries on their return from the tour.

6 June 2009
13:00 CDT

United States	15–48	Wales
Try: Tuilevuka 53' c Gagiano 80+1' m Con: DeBartolo 54'; Pen: DeBartolo 13'	Report	Try: M. Jones 15' c J. Davies (2) 21' c, 78' c Penalty try 35' c James 62' c Cooper 70' c Con: Robinson (3) 15', 36', 64'; James 22'; Biggar (2) 71', 79'; Pen: Robinson (2) 9', 11'

Toyota Park, Bridgeview, Illinois
Referee: Matt Goddard (Australia)

FB	15	Chris Wyles
RW	14	Gavin DeBartolo
OC	13	Alipate Tuilevuka
IC	12	Roland Suniula
LW	11	Kevin Swiryn		(substituted off) 67'
FH	10	Ata Malifa		(substituted off) 42'
SH	9	Mike Petri (c)		(substituted off) 68'
N8	8	Nic Johnson
OF	7	Peter Dahl
BF	6	Louis Stanfill	(yellow card) 33'
RL	5	Hayden Smith
LL	4	John van der Giessen
TP	3	Will Johnson		(substituted off) 66'
HK	2	Chris Biller		(substituted off) 56'
LP	1	Matekitonga Moeakiola		(substituted off) 66'
Replacements:
HK	16	Brian McClenahan		(substituted on) 56'
PR	17	Mike MacDonald		(substituted on) 66'
LK	18	Courtney Mackay
N8	19	JJ Gagiano		(substituted on) 66'
SH	20	Tim Usasz		(substituted on) 68'
FH	21	Mike Hercus		(substituted on) 42'
WG	22	Junior Sifa		(substituted on) 67'
Coach:
(Ireland) Eddie O'Sullivan

FB	15	Dan Evans	(substituted off) 61'
RW	14	Tom James	(substituted off) 69'
OC	13	Jonathan Davies
IC	12	Andrew Bishop
LW	11	Mark Jones
FH	10	Nicky Robinson	(substituted off) 64'
SH	9	Dwayne Peel
N8	8	Ryan Jones (c)	(substituted off) 19'
OF	7	Robin Sowden-Taylor	(substituted off) 29'
BF	6	Dafydd Jones
RL	5	Deiniol Jones
LL	4	Ian Gough	(substituted off) 48'
TP	3	John Yapp	(substituted off) 48'	(substituted on) 64'
HK	2	Gareth Williams
LP	1	Duncan Jones		(substituted off) 64'
Replacements:
HK	16	Richard Hibbard	(substituted on) 29'
PR	17	Craig Mitchell	(substituted on) 48'
LK	18	Luke Charteris	(substituted on) 48'
FL	19	Sam Warburton	(substituted on) 19'
SH	20	Gareth Cooper	(substituted on) 69'
FH	21	Dan Biggar	(substituted on) 64'
CE	22	Jonathan Spratt	(substituted on) 61'
Coach:
(Wales) Robin McBryde

== Broadcasting ==
Broadcast rights for the matches were held in Wales by the BBC and S4C. The match against Canada was shown live on BBC Two Wales with highlights on S4C, while the game against the United States was shown live on S4C with highlights on BBC Two Wales. Radio commentaries were provided by BBC Radio Wales for both matches and BBC Radio Cymru for the United States game.
