= 2009 Ireland rugby union tour of North America =

- Coach: Declan Kidney
- Tour captain: Rory Best
- Top test point scorer: Ian Keatley (17)
- Top test try scorer: Ian Whitten (2)
Summary
P	W	D	L
Test match
2	2	0	0
Opponent
P	W	D	L
Canada
1	1	0	0
United States
1	1	0	0

Tour chronology
- ← New Zealand and Australia 2008 New Zealand and Australia 2010 →

Ireland toured North America in May 2009, playing a Test match against Canada and the United States. Ireland won both matches, despite most of their first string players away on the 2009 Lions tour to South Africa.

== Matches ==
23 May 2009
14:00 PTZ (UTC-07)

Canada	6–25	Ireland
Pen: Pritchard (2/2) 38', 43'	Report	Try: Murphy 18' c Whitten 63' c Buckley 69' m Con: Keatley (2/3); Pen: Keatley (2/3) 57', 61'

Thunderbird Stadium, Vancouver, British Columbia
Attendance: 7,280
Referee: Chris White (England)

Team details

FB	15	Pritchard
RW	14	Dean van Camp
OC	13	Ciaran Hearn
IC	12	Ryan Smith
LW	11	D. T. H. van der Merwe
FH	10	Dave Spicer
SH	9	Ed Fairhurst
N8	8	Aaron Carpenter
OF	7	Adam Kleeberger
BF	6	Chauncey O'Toole
RL	5	Mike Burak
LL	4	Tyler Hotson
TP	3	Scott Franklin
HK	2	Pat Riordan (c)
LP	1	Kevin Tkachuk
Replacements:
HK	16	Andrew Tiedemann
LK	17	Luke Tait
LK	18	Jebb Sinclair
FL	19	Nanyak Dala
FL	20	Sean-Michael Stephen
SH	21	Phil Mack
FH	22	Ander Monro
Coach:
(New Zealand) Kieran Crowley

FB	15	Gavin Duffy
RW	14	Barry Murphy
OC	13	Darren Cave
IC	12	Ian Whitten
LW	11	Ian Dowling
FH	10	Ian Keatley
SH	9	Peter Stringer
N8	8	Denis Leamy
OF	7	Niall Ronan
BF	6	John Muldoon
RL	5	Mick O'Driscoll
LL	4	Bob Casey
TP	3	Tony Buckley
HK	2	Rory Best (c)
LP	1	Tom Court
Replacements:
HK	16	Seán Cronin
PR	17	Mike Ross
LK	18	Ryan Caldwell
FL	19	Donnacha Ryan
SH	20	Eoin Reddan
FH	21	Niall O'Connor
FB	22	Denis Hurley
Coach:
(Ireland) Declan Kidney

31 May 2009
13:00 PTZ (UTC-07)

United States	10–27	Ireland
Try: Suniula 65' c Con: Malifa (1/1); Drop: Malifa (1/1) 63'	Report	Try: Casey 13' m Whitten 40'+2' m Penalty try 53' c Best 70' c Con: Keatley (2/4); Pen: Keatley (1/2) 24'

Buck Shaw Stadium, Santa Clara, California
Attendance: 10,000
Referee: Chris White (England)

Team details

FB	15	Chris Wyles
RW	14	Kevin Swiryn
OC	13	Junior Sifa
IC	12	Roland Suniula
LW	11	Justin Boyd
FH	10	Mike Hercus (c)
SH	9	Mike Petri
N8	8	Nic Johnson
OF	7	Peter Dahl
BF	6	Louis Stanfill
RL	5	Hayden Smith
LL	4	John van der Giessen
TP	3	Will Johnson
HK	2	Chris Biller
LP	1	Mike MacDonald
Replacements:
HK	16	Joe Welch
PR	17	Mate Moeakiola
LK	18	Courtney McKay
N8	19	JJ Gagiano
SH	20	Tim Usasz
FH	21	Ata Malifa
CE	22	Alipate Tuilevuka
Coach:
(Ireland) Eddie O'Sullivan

FB	15	Gavin Duffy
RW	14	Barry Murphy
OC	13	Darren Cave
IC	12	Ian Whitten
LW	11	Ian Dowling
FH	10	Ian Keatley
SH	9	Peter Stringer
N8	8	Denis Leamy
OF	7	Niall Ronan
BF	6	John Muldoon
RL	5	Mick O'Driscoll
LL	4	Bob Casey
TP	3	Mike Ross
HK	2	Rory Best (c)
LP	1	Tony Buckley
Replacements:
HK	16	Seán Cronin
PR	17	Tom Court
LK	18	Ryan Caldwell
LK	19	Donnacha Ryan
SH	20	Eoin Reddan
FH	21	Niall O'Connor
FB	22	Denis Hurley
Coach:
(Ireland) Declan Kidney

== Touring party ==
Ireland named their 25-man tour squad on 17 May 2009, which included 13 previously uncapped players.

- Manager: Declan Kidney
- Captain: Rory Best

- Rory Best (Belfast Harlequins/Ulster)
- Tony Buckley (Shannon RFC/Munster)
- Ryan Caldwell (Dungannon RFC/Ulster)
- Bob Casey (London Irish)
- Tom Court (Malone RFC/Ulster)
- Sean Cronin (Buccaneers RFC/Connacht)
- Ian Dowling (Shannon RFC/Munster)
- Gavin Duffy (Galwegians RFC/Connacht)
- Chris Henry (Ballymena RFC/Ulster)
- Denis Hurley (Cork Constitution/Munster)
- Ian Keatley (Galwegians RFC/Connacht)
- Denis Leamy (Cork Constitution/Munster)
- Keith Matthews (Buccaneers RFC/Connacht)
- John Muldoon (Galwegians RFC/Connacht)
- Barry Murphy (UL Bohemians/Munster)
- Niall O'Connor (Belfast Harlequins/Ulster)
- Mick O'Driscoll (Cork Constitution/Munster)
- Eoin Reddan (London Wasps)
- Niall Ronan (Shannon RFC/Munster)
- Mike Ross (Harlequins RFC
- Donnacha Ryan (Shannon RFC/Munster)
- Peter Stringer (Shannon RFC/Munster)
- Ian Whitten (Ballymena RFC/Ulster)
- Bryan Young (Ballymena RFC/Ulster)

== See also ==
- History of rugby union matches between Ireland and United States
- 2009 mid year rugby union tests
