= 2010 United States rugby union tour of Europe =

- Manager: Eddie O'Sullivan
- Tour captain: Todd Clever
Summary
P	W	D	L
Total
4	1	0	3
Test match
2	1	0	1
Opponent
P	W	D	L
Portugal
1	1	0	0
Georgia
1	0	0	1

Tour chronology
- ← Japan 2008 Europe 2012 →

The 2010 United States rugby union tour of Europe was a series of tests played in November 2010 in Europe by the United States national rugby union team.

== Background ==
The Eagles assembled a 28-man squad for 2010 November tests which included 11 domestic-based players. Eddie O'Sullivan's squad was captained by Todd Clever. While in London, the team trained at the Old Albanians training ground.

== Results ==
Scores and results list United States's points tally first.

Opposing Team	For	Against	Date	Venue	Status	Attendance	Ref.
Saracens F.C.	6	20	November 9, 2010	Honourable Artillery Company, London	Tour match		
Portugal	22	17	November 13, 2010	Lisbon University Stadium, Lisbon	Test Match		
Scotland A	0	25	November 19, 2010	Netherdale, Galashiels	Tour match		
Georgia	17	19	November 27, 2010	Boris Paichadze National Stadium, Tbilisi	Test Match	35,000	

== Test Matches ==
13 November 2010

Portugal	17–22	United States
Try: Uva 73' m Con: Gardener (0/1); Pen: Gardener (4) 5', 18', 42', 57'	Report	Try: Ngwenya 28'; Suniula 56'; Emerick 60'; Con: Malifa (2/3); Pen: Malifa (1) 34'

Lisbon University Stadium, Lisbon, Portugal
Referee: JP Doyle (England)

FB	15	Pedro Leal
RW	14	José Lima	(substituted off) 54'
OC	13	Frederico Oliveira	(substituted off) 65'
IC	12	Pedro Silva
LW	11	António Aguilar
FH	10	Joseph Gardener	(substituted off) 70'
SH	9	José Pinto
N8	8	Tiago Girão	(substituted off) 55'
OF	7	Julien Bardy
BF	6	Vasco Uva
RL	5	Juan Severino Somoza	(substituted off) 55'
LL	4	Gonçalo Uva
TP	3	Anthony Alves	(substituted off) 65'
HK	2	João Correia (c)	(substituted off) 55'
LP	1	Ruben Spachuck
Replacements:
HK	16	Lionel Campergue	(substituted on) 55'
PR	17	Ivo Morais	(substituted on) 65'
LK	18	Rui D'Orey	(substituted on) 55'
FL	19	Laurent Balangué	(substituted on) 55'
FH	20	Pedro Cabral	(substituted on) 70'
CE	21	Francisco Mira	(substituted on) 65'
WG	22	Gonçalo Foro	(substituted on) 54'
Coach:
(New Zealand) Errol Brain

FB	15	Chris Wyles
RW	14	Takudzwa Ngwenya
OC	13	Seta Tuilevuka	(substituted off) 50'
IC	12	Andrew Suniula
LW	11	Kevin Swiryn
FH	10	Nese Malifa
SH	9	Tim Usasz	(substituted off) 72'
N8	8	Nic Johnson	(substituted off) 60'
OF	7	Todd Clever (c)
BF	6	Louis Stanfill
RL	5	John van der Giessen	(substituted off) 28'
LL	4	Scott Lavalla
TP	3	Shawn Pittman
HK	2	Phil Thiel	(substituted off) 72'
LP	1	Matekitonga Moeakiola	(substituted off) 60'
Replacements:
HK	16	Chris Biller	(substituted on) 72'
PR	17	Mike MacDonald	(substituted on) 60'
N8	18	JJ Gagiano	(substituted on) 60'
FL	19	Inaki Basauri	(substituted on) 28'
SH	20	Mike Petri	(substituted on) 72'
FH	21	Tai Enosa
CE	22	Paul Emerick	(substituted on) 50'
Coach:
(Ireland) Eddie O'Sullivan

27 November 2010
14:00 GT (UTC+04)

Georgia	19–17	United States
Try: Gugava; Con: Kvirikashvili; Pen: Malaghuradze (3); Kvirikashvili	Report	Try: Emerick; Con: Malifa; Drop: Malifa; Wyles

Boris Paichadze National Stadium, Tbilisi
Attendance: 35,000
Referee: Peter Allan (Scotland)

FB	15	Bessik Khamashuridze
RW	14	Irakli Machkhaneli
OC	13	Irakli Chkhikvadze
IC	12	Teodore Zibzibadze
LW	11	Lekso Gugava
FH	10	Lasha Malaghuradze
SH	9	Irakli Abuseridze (c)
N8	8	Besarion Udesiani
OF	7	Giorgi Chkhaidze
BF	6	Simon Maisuradze
RL	5	Levan Datunashvili
LL	4	Shalva Sutiashvili
TP	3	David Kubriashvili
HK	2	Akvsenti Giorgadze
LP	1	Goderdzi Shvelidze
Replacements:
HK	16	Iuri Natriashvili
PR	17	Davit Zirakashvili
N8	18	Viktor Kolelishvili
LK	19	Giorgi Nemsadze
SH	20	Bidzina Samkharadze
CE	21	David Kacharava
FB	22	Merab Kvirikashvili
Coach:
(Scotland) Richard Dixon

FB	15	Chris Wyles
RW	14	Takudzwa Ngwenya
OC	13	Paul Emerick
IC	12	Andrew Suniula
LW	11	Kevin Swiryn
FH	10	Nese Malifa
SH	9	Tim Usasz
N8	8	Inaki Basauri
OF	7	Todd Clever (c)
BF	6	Louis Stanfill
RL	5	Hayden Smith
LL	4	Samu Manoa
TP	3	Shawn Pittman
HK	2	Phil Thiel
LP	1	Matekitonga Moeakiola
Replacements:
HK	16	Chris Biller
PR	17	Mike MacDonald
LK	18	Scott LaValla
N8	19	Nic Johnson
SH	20	Mike Petri
FH	21	Tai Enosa
CE	22	Seta Tuilevuka
Coach:
(Ireland) Eddie O'Sullivan

Touch judges:
Andrew Healy (Scotland)
Allan Forrest (Scotland)
