= Tuilevuka =

Tuilevuka is a surname. Notable people with the surname include:

- Alipate Tuilevuka (born 1980), American rugby union player
- Seta Tuilevuka (born 1981), American rugby union player
