= Tom James (rugby union, born 1987) =

Wales international rugby union footballer

- Born: Thomas James; 17 April 1987 (age 39) Rhymney, Wales
- Height: 1.83 m (6 ft 0 in)
- Weight: 101 kg (15 st 13 lb)
- School: Rhymney Comprehensive School

Rugby union career
- Position: Wing
Amateur team(s)
Years	Team	Apps	(Points)
2006	Merthyr		
Senior career
Years	Team	Apps	(Points)
2006–2009	Cardiff RFC	15	(70)
2006–2013	Cardiff Blues	114	(195)
2013–2015	Exeter Chiefs	39	(40)
2015–2019	Cardiff Blues	49	(105)
2019–2020	Scarlets	2	(0)
- Correct as of 17 October 2022
International career
Years	Team	Apps	(Points)
2007–2016	Wales	12	(10)
- Correct as of 13 February 2016
National sevens team
Years	Team		Comps
2007	Wales		

Tom James (born 17 April 1987 in Rhymney) is a Welsh former professional rugby union player. James represented Wales and spent most of his career with Cardiff Blues

== Club career ==
After turning to rugby from athletics, he joined Merthyr RFC on the wing. After a successful year at Merthyr James joined Cardiff RFC at the start of the 2006–07 season. James scored 11 tries in just nine games to open the season which brought him to the attention of the first fifteen, with whom he had an academy contract. He was immediately put into the 22 man squad for the Cardiff Blues trip to Edinburgh in the Celtic League. He came off the bench midway through the second half and within minutes had marked his professional debut with a try.

A slight knock kept him out of the first few games of the 2007–08 season. He came back shortly after the start, firstly playing a game for Cardiff RFC before starting the Blues away game against Munster in which he scored two tries. The following week he started again at home against Connacht and scored two more tries late on helping the Blues to a bonus point win.

James was top try scorer in the Magners League in the 2007–08 season.

James missed the first nine weeks of this season due to a groin injury. He scored a try in the final of the EDF Energy Cup at Twickenham on 18 April 2009 against Gloucester. He also scored the try that lead Cardiff to draw 26–26 in the Heineken Cup Semi-Final.

On 24 January 2013 it was announced that James had signed for Exeter Chiefs for the 2013–14 season.

On 20 December 2014 it was announced that James had returned to the Cardiff Blues on a two-year deal.

After being released by the Blues at the end of the 2018–19 season, James signed for rival Welsh region the Scarlets. Towards the end of his second stint at the Blues, James revealed in an interview that he had been suffering from clinical depression which had caused him to miss a number of games.

After a single season with the Scarlets during which injuries limited him to only two competitive appearances, James announced his retirement from professional Rugby at the end of the 2019–20 season. As of 2020 he remains the Blues' record try-scorer, with 60 tries scored.

== International career ==
His rise through Welsh rugby continued and during the 2006–07 season he joined the Wales Sevens team for a number of games. Following the 2006–07 season he was called up to the Welsh national squad for the summer tour of Australia, although he did not play a game on the tour.

During the build up to the 2007 Rugby World Cup he was a part of the 40 man squad and made his debut for his country against England in August 2007. When the 40 man squad was cut to 30 at the end of August, James was not selected and he returned to Cardiff Blues for the Magners League season.

James returned to the squad for the 2009 Wales rugby union tour of North America, starting in both matches and scoring in each test.

On 18 January 2010 he was named in the 35 man Wales national Squad for the 2010 Six Nations Championship.

On 1 June 2015 James was included in the Welsh training squad for the 2015 Rugby World Cup, and was included in the Welsh squad for the 2016 Six Nations Championship. He made what was to be his twelfth and final appearance for Wales in that year's Six Nations, against Scotland.

=== International tries ===
Try	Opponent	Location	Venue	Competition	Date	Result
1	Canada	Toronto, Canada	York Stadium	2009 June rugby union tests	30 May 2009	Win
2	United States	Chicago, United States	Toyota Park	2009 June rugby union tests	6 June 2009	Win

== Personal life ==
He was a Welsh athlete before turning to rugby. His older brother, Robbie, is a professional welterweight boxer and former Welsh ABA Champion.
