= Chris Czekaj =

Wales international rugby union player

- Born: Christopher David Czekaj; 14 December 1985 (age 40) Cardiff, South Glamorgan, Wales
- Height: 6 ft 3 in (1.91 m)
- Weight: 106 kg (16 st 10 lb)

Rugby union career
- Position: Back
Youth career
- Llandaff RFC
Senior career
| Years | Team | Apps | (Points) |
| 2004–2010 | Cardiff RFC | 18 | (65) |
| 2004–2014 | Cardiff Blues | 136 | (125) |
| 2014–2016 | US Colomiers | 17 | (15) |
| 2016–2017 | Avenir Valencien | 14 | (10) |
| 2017–2019 | Bedford Blues | 21 | (35) |
| 2019–2020 | Merthyr RFC | | |
- Correct as of 6 November 2022
International career
| Years | Team | Apps | (Points) |
| 2005–2010 | Wales | 9 | (10) |
- Correct as of 5 January 2014
National sevens team
| Years | Team | | Comps |
| 2009 | Wales | | |
Coaching career
- Years: Team
- 2019: Bishop of Llandaff

Chris Czekaj (born 14 December 1985) is a retired Wales international rugby union player, who played fullback or wing. He most recently played for Merthyr RFC, and spent most of his career with Cardiff Blues. He represented Wales and Wales U21.

== Club career ==
Czakaj made his debut for the Cardiff Blues in April 2005, starting on the wing against Ulster.

On 11 April 2014, the Cardiff Blues announced that Czekaj would be joining Rugby Pro D2 side US Colomiers at the end of the 2013/14 season.

After two seasons the Colomiers, he moved to Fédérale 1 side Avenir Valencien

Following three years in the South of France, Czekaj moved to English Championship club Bedford Blues. Czekaj spent two seasons with the Championship side, coached by former Cardiff back and Welsh international Mike Rayer.

Czekaj spent one season with Merthyr RFC before retiring from professional rugby in May 2020.

== International career ==
Czekaj made his Wales debut against Canada in June 2005, scoring a try in the win.

On 2 June 2007 he suffered a broken leg in the second test match against Australia, thus ruling him out of the 2007 Rugby World Cup. Following a full year of recovery and rehabilitation, Czekaj resumed playing for the Blues early in the 2008–09 season.

He returned to the national squad in 2009 for the tour of North America. Against Canada, he scored his second try for Wales four years after scoring his first, coming against the same opposition.

Czekaj was named in the Welsh squad for the 2010 Autumn Internationals, coming off the bench in the 25–29 loss against South Africa. This was to be his final appearance for Wales.

=== International tries ===
| Try | Opponent | Location | Venue | Competition | Date | Result |
|---|---|---|---|---|---|---|
| 1 | Canada | Toronto, Canada | York Stadium | 2005 June rugby union tests | 11 June 2005 | Win |
| 2 | Canada | Toronto, Canada | York Stadium | 2009 June rugby union tests | 30 May 2009 | Win |

== Personal life ==
The name Czekaj (meaning 'Wait' in English) comes from his Polish grandfather, who settled in Wales during World War II.

His nickname amongst Welsh rugby supporters is '28', referring to the score his name would earn if played in a game of Scrabble.

Czekaj married his long-term girlfriend Kat Roberts, a former Miss Wales finalist, in 2011.

Following a series of concussive head injuries, Czekaj's wife Kat took to Twitter to recall the impact Chris' injuries had on them both including disorientation, memory loss and temporary alterations in personality.
