= Eifion Lewis-Roberts =

Wales international rugby union footballer

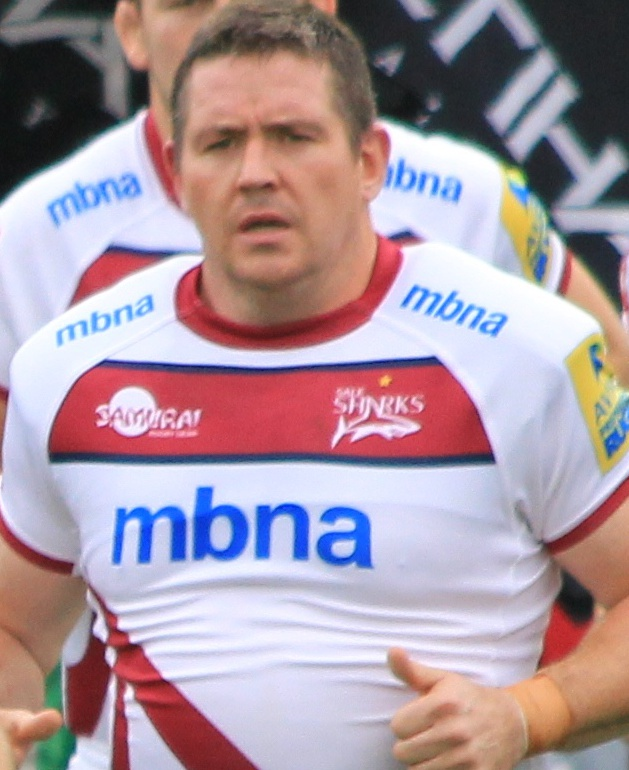
- Lewis-Roberts playing for Sale Sharks in 2013
- Born: Eifion Lewis-Roberts; 13 February 1981 (age 45) St Asaph, Wales
- Height: 1.86 m (6 ft 1 in)
- Weight: 132 kg (20 st 11 lb)

Rugby union career
- Position: Prop
Senior career
Years	Team	Apps	(Points)
2005–2011	Sale Sharks	100	(25)
2011–2012	Toulon	34	(10)
2012–2017	Sale Sharks	110	(15)
International career
Years	Team	Apps	(Points)
2008	Wales	1	(0)

Eifion Lewis-Roberts (born 13 February 1981) is a Welsh former international rugby union who played as a prop, for Sale Sharks and Toulon. He also earned one cap for Wales.

== Professional career ==
From St Asaph, Roberts played for Ruthin RFC before joining Sale in 2005.

Roberts was selected by Wales for the 2008 end-of-year rugby union internationals, earning his first and only cap on 14 November against Canada.

Lewis-Roberts was selected for the 2009 Wales rugby union tour of North America, but forced to withdraw due to injury. He was omitted from the squad for the 2009 end-of-year rugby union internationals to focus on fitness targets.

On 18 January 2010, he was named in the 35-man Wales squad for the 2010 Six Nations Championship.

Despite interest from clubs in the Celtic League and the French Top 14, Lewis-Roberts signed a three-year contract with Sale Sharks in March 2010. In September the same year, early in the season, Lewis-Roberts suffered an injury to the anterior cruciate ligament in his knee in a match against Harlequins. As Lewis-Robert required re-constructive surgery on his knee, he was expected to miss most of the season. He signed for French Top 14 outfit Toulon in 2011 reuniting with Philippe Saint-Andre his former coach at Sale. At the end of the 2011–12 season he returned to Sale Sharks as part of a deal which saw Andrew Sheridan go in the other direction to Toulon. While in France, he was falsely accused of using performance-enhancing drugs, with the investigation clearing him on all charges.

Lewis-Roberts retired from rugby in September 2017 after suffering a knee injury.
