= Matt Banahan =

Jersey-born rugby union player

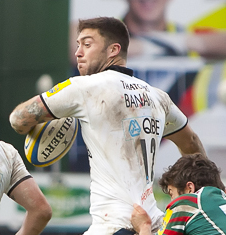
- Banahan in 2012
- Born: Matthew Andrew Banahan; 30 December 1986 (age 39) St Helier, Jersey
- Height: 2.01 m (6 ft 7 in)
- Weight: 110 kg (17 st 5 lb; 243 lb)

Rugby union career
- Position: Wing/Centre/Fullback
Youth career
- Jersey Reds
- London Irish
Senior career
Years	Team	Apps	(Points)
2006–2018	Bath	264	(504)
2018–2021	Gloucester	44	(55)
International career
Years	Team	Apps	(Points)
2008–2011	England Saxons	4	(25)
2009–2011	England	16	(20)
National sevens team
Years	Team		Comps
2007–2008	England		
Coaching career
- Years: Team
- 2023–2025: Scotland women (Attack coach)
- 2025–: Gloucester–Hartpury (Assistant coach)

Matthew Andrew Banahan (born 30 December 1986) is a rugby union coach and former player who played for Bath and Gloucester in Premiership Rugby, between 2006 and 2021. Born in Jersey, he played 20 times for England, receiving 16 caps between 2009 and 2011. His main position was wing; however, he could also operate as an inside or outside centre.

== Early life ==
Banahan grew up playing field hockey, earning selection to the Jersey and West of England junior representative sides before he decided his hockey career was stalling and switched to rugby union.

Banahan went to La Moye school, Les Quennevais School and Highlands College.

== Club career ==
Banahan moved to Bath in the summer of 2006, after previously appearing for the London Irish Academy. He was brought to the Recreation Ground as a lock. He had also been involved with the RFU's Junior National Academy set-up and, England's sevens set up.

He switched to wing where his powerful combination of size, strength and speed made him a potent weapon in the Bath United and Development sides, for whom he scored ten tries in fourteen games in one season.

Quickly promoted from the academy, Banahan made 26 first team appearances and finished the 2007/08 season as the club's top try scorer (16) and the Guinness Premiership regular season's second highest (10) behind Leicester's Tom Varndell (13).

On 10 January 2018, it was announced by Bath that Banahan would be leaving after a 12-year association to join West Country rivals, Gloucester in time for the 2018–19 season.

On 29 November 2020, Banahan announced his retirement from all forms of rugby competition finishing at the end of the 2020–21 season.

== International career ==
Banahan was selected for the "wider" England Sevens squad in the 2007–08 IRB Sevens World Series, which refers to a pool of players who supplement the 11 core squad members. As a member of the wider squad, he was eligible for selection for up to four of the eight events in the tournament. He was also selected for the England Saxons squad to play in the 2008 Churchill Cup. He celebrated his Saxons debut by scoring a hat trick in a 64–10 victory over the USA in the opening round. He then scored two tries against Ireland A and one in the final against Scotland A.

Banahan played for England on Saturday 30 May 2009 against the Barbarians at Twickenham in an uncapped game where he scored a try. He was called up to the England squad for their summer tour replacing David Strettle who was ruled out through injury. He made his full England debut on 6 June 2009 in a comfortable win over Argentina at Old Trafford where he also scored a try and was named 'Man of the Match'. He retained his place for England's 2009 Autumn series against Australia, Argentina and New Zealand, and scored his third international try in the win against Argentina.

Banahan made his first start in the centre for England during their 2010 Autumn series, playing at outside centre in the game versus Samoa on 20 November 2010. He scored a try when England were trailing 6–8, and set up England's second through an intercepted pass. On the back of this performance, he was named on the bench for England's final game of 2010 against South Africa.

Banahan last played for England in October 2011.

=== International tries ===
Try	Opposing team	Location	Venue	Competition	Date	Result	Score
1	Argentina	Manchester, England	Old Trafford	2009 Summer Internationals	6 June 2009	Win	37 – 15
2	Argentina	Salta, Argentina	Estadio Padre Ernesto Martearena	2009 Summer Internationals	13 June 2009	Loss	22 – 24
3	Argentina	London, England	Twickenham Stadium	2009 Autumn Internationals	14 November 2009	Win	16 – 9
4	Samoa	London, England	Twickenham Stadium	2010 Autumn Internationals	20 November 2010	Win	26 – 13

== Post rugby career ==
On 28 January 2021, Banahan returned to Bath to become the Glasshouse Academy manager for the Bath Recreation team and became a Sports Ambassador from July 2021.

== Coaching career ==
On 21 August 2023, Banahan was announced as attack coach for the Scotland national women's rugby union team. it was announced that Banahan had left his role with Scotland on 20 June 2025. On 23 June 2025, it was announced that he was appointed assistant coach at Premiership Women's Rugby side Gloucester–Hartpury.
