= Brian McClenahan =

US international rugby union player (born 1982)

- Born: June 12, 1982 (age 44) Mountain View, California, U.S.
- Height: 1.80 m (5 ft 11 in)
- Weight: 104 kg (229 lb; 16.4 st)

Rugby union career
- Position: Prop/Hooker
Amateur team(s)
Years	Team	Apps	(Points)
- Olympic Club RFC
International career
Years	Team	Apps	(Points)
2009–2011	United States	3	(0)
- Correct as of 31 December 2020

Brian McClenahan (born June 12, 1982) is a former American rugby union player. McClenahan played both prop and hooker. He represented the USA Eagle XV side in the prop position. His debut for his country was in June 2009 against Wales. He was selected to tour with the USA Eagles squad for the Autumn 2010 tour of Europe. McClenahan played his club rugby for Olympic Club.
