= Richard Mustoe =

- Born: Richard Mustoe; 9 December 1981 (age 44) Bridgend, Wales
- Height: 1.85 m (6 ft 1 in)
- Weight: 87 kg (192 lb)

Rugby union career
- Position: Winger
Senior career
Years	Team	Apps	(Points)
	Bridgend	0	(0)
	Celtic Warriors	0	(0)
2007-12	Ospreys	0	(0)
2008	Dragons	20	(15)
2008-12	Cardiff Blues	66	(50)
National sevens team
Years	Team		Comps
- Wales 7s

Richard Mustoe is a former Welsh rugby union footballer (born 9 December 1981). A winger, he played for Bridgend, Celtic Warriors, Ospreys and the Cardiff Blues. In July 2007 he joined Newport Gwent Dragons on a one-season loan from the Ospreys, making 20 appearances and scoring 15 points for the Dragons. After returning from his loan deal at the Dragons he moved to Cardiff in 2008.

Mustoe retired in December 2012 due to a pelvic injury sustained whilst playing for the Cardiff Blues against Treviso.

Mustoe was a Wales sevens international member.

Mustoe was called up to the senior Wales squad for the tour of North America in 2009, though he was later cut from the squad and put on stand by.
