= Will Johnson (rugby union, born 1984) =

US international rugby union player (born 1984)

- Born: William Drew Johnson; May 29, 1984 (age 42) Tustin, California, U.S.
- Height: 1.91 m (6 ft 3 in)
- Weight: 123 kg (19 st 5 lb)

Rugby union career
- Position: Prop
Amateur team(s)
Years	Team	Apps	(Points)
2007–2008	Olympic Club		
2008–2010	Oxford University RFC		
Senior career
Years	Team	Apps	(Points)
2010–2011	London Irish	3	
–	Rosslyn Park		
International career
Years	Team	Apps	(Points)
2009–	USA	4	(0)
- Correct as of November 18, 2010

William Drew Johnson (born May 29, 1984) is an American rugby union player who plays for Rosslyn Park and the United States.

Johnson was selected to tour with the USA Eagles for the Autumn 2010 tour of Europe. Johnson's first cap for the USA was on his 25th birthday in 2009 against Ireland and now-teammate Bob Casey. He received notoriety in British press for his second cap against Wales; he collided with and concussed Welsh captain, Ryan Jones, on the opening kickoff ending the latter's tour.

== Rugby career ==
A December 2009 New York Times article details Will Johnson's late and interesting introduction to rugby. He played his first-ever match in January 2007 for San Francisco's Olympic Club; he had picked up rugby on a 'lark' following NFL camps with the Cincinnati Bengals and New England Patriots. Will was an All-American offensive lineman at Harvard University

In 2008 he matriculated at Pembroke College to play for Oxford University RFC. He was contracted by London Irish for the 2010–2011 season and Rosslyn Park 2011-2012.
