= Seta Tuilevuka =

US international rugby union player

- Born: Setareki Tuilevuka; October 27, 1981 (age 45) Suva, Fiji Islands
- Height: 1.83 m (6 ft 0 in)
- Weight: 97 kg (214 lb)
- Notable relative: Alipate Tuilevuka (brother)

Rugby union career
- Position: Center
Senior career
Years	Team	Apps	(Points)
2010–2012	Montpellier RC	16	(10)
2012–2014	Béziers	22	(5)
2014–2016	ROC La Voulte-Valence	29	(20)
2021–	Seattle Seawolves		
- Correct as of 1 April 2021
International career
Years	Team	Apps	(Points)
2010	United States	1	(0)
- Correct as of 25 December 2010

Seta Tuilevuka (born 27 October 1981 in Fiji) is an American rugby union player who currently plays for the Seattle Seawolves. Tuilevuka plays at centre and was selected to tour with the USA Eagles squad for the Autumn 2010 tour of Europe.

== Club career ==
Tuilevuka was the first amateur US-based player to sign a professional contract, without having any caps for the national team. He went straight from an amateur rugby club, the Las Vegas Blackjacks RFC, to a Top 14 professional French club, Montpellier where he would play for two seasons. In his first season the club reached the 2010–11 Top 14 final.

Tuilevuka joined Béziers for the 2012-13 Pro D2 season and gained 22 caps over his two years with the French side. Tuilevuka signed with Seattle Saracens for the 2021 Major League rugby season having not played professional rugby since he last played for Federale 1 side, ROC La Voulte-Valence, in 2016.

== International ==
Tuilevuka achieved his sole test cap for the United States in a victory over Portugal in 2010.
