= Ryan Caldwell =

Irish rugby union footballer

- Born: Ryan Caldwell; 1 September 1984 (age 42) Belfast, Northern Ireland
- Height: 2 m (6 ft 6 1/2 in)
- Weight: 112 kg (17.6 st)
- School: Royal Belfast Academical Institution

Rugby union career
- Position: Lock
Amateur team(s)
Years	Team	Apps	(Points)
- Dungannon
Senior career
Years	Team	Apps	(Points)
2005–2011	Ulster	79	(15)
2011–2014	Bath	50	(10)
2014	Exeter Chiefs	11	(0)
- Correct as of 20 December 2020
International career
Years	Team	Apps	(Points)
- Ireland U21
2007–2010	Ireland Wolfhounds	11	(10)
2009	Ireland	2	(0)
- Correct as of 31 May 2009

Ryan Caldwell (born 1 September 1984) is an Irish former rugby union player who played lock for Ulster, Bath and Exeter Chiefs, and won two caps for Ireland.

Attended Royal Belfast Academical Institution, captaining them to an Ulster Schools' Cup win in 2003. He represented Ireland at two under-21 World Cups, and signed a development contract with Ulster on leaving school. he joined the Ulster senior squad from Dungannon RFC in 2005. he made 79 appearances over five seasons for Ulster.

Won two caps for Ireland. At an Ireland training camp in 2007, he tackled Paul O'Connell in a session that was supposed to be no-contact. O'Connell responded by punching him, and Caldwell was knocked unconscious, requiring CPR and hospital treatment.

He moved to Bath in 2011, and Exeter Chiefs in 2014. He retired on medical advice after a series of concussions. He had suffered from degenerative hips from the age of 22, and had two hip replacements after retiring. The pain of his injuries and his lack of preparation for life after rugby took their toll on his mental health. He returned to Northern Ireland, turned to alcohol, and began using and selling drugs. He was remanded to Maghaberry Prison twice, and attempted suicide.

He went on to become a certified Kambo practitioner, and set up a business, Inner Evolution, teaching meditation and breath work.

Caldwell's memoir "White Lines - A Rugby Life Broken and Rebuilt" was published in 2026.

== Bibliography ==
- Caldwell, Ryan (2026). White Lines-A Rugby Life Broken and Rebuilt. Hachette Books Ireland. ISBN 9781399758574.
