= Gavin DeBartolo =

US international rugby union player

- Born: 29 March 1982 (age 44) Bondi, Sydney, Australia
- Height: 190 cm (6 ft 3 in)
- Weight: 264 lb (120 kg)

Rugby union career
- Position: Wing
Senior career
Years	Team	Apps	(Points)
2006	Western Force	4	
2007	Sydney Fleet	6	
2008	La Rochelle	3	
	Eastern Suburbs	100+	
2013	Balmain	40	
International career
Years	Team	Apps	(Points)
2008	United States	6	(12)

Gavin DeBartolo (born 29 March 1982) is an Australian born retired rugby union footballer who played wing and fullback for the United States.

DeBartolo qualified to play for the United States through his father Michael.
