= Sean-Michael Stephen =

Canada international rugby union player

- Born: Sean-Michael Stephen; 27 October 1982 (age 44) Oakville, Canada
- Height: 195 cm (6 ft 5 in)
- Weight: 107 kg (236 lb)

Rugby union career
- Position: Flanker / No.8
Senior career
Years	Team	Apps	(Points)
2006-2008	AS Béziers Hérault	15	(5)
2008-	Plymouth Albion	72	(35)
- Correct as of 30 January 2014
International career
Years	Team	Apps	(Points)
2005-2010	Canada	22	(25)
- Correct as of 30 December 2011

Sean-Michael Stephen (born 27 October 1982) is a Canadian rugby union player. From 2006 to 2008, Stephen played for French club AS Béziers Hérault. Since 2008, he has played for and currently captains Plymouth Albion in the Aviva Championship.

Stephen made his Canadian national team debut against the United States in 2005. He played for Canada at the 2007 Rugby World Cup.
