= Justin Boyd (rugby union) =

US international rugby union player

- Born: March 26, 1986 (age 40) Dallas, TX, United States
- Height: 6 ft 2 in (188 cm)
- Weight: 177 lb (80 kg)
- School: Lake Highlands High School
- University: Texas A&M University

Rugby union career
- Position: Wing
International career
Years	Team	Apps	(Points)
2008–09	United States	2	(0)

Justin Boyd (born March 26, 1986) is an American former international rugby union player.

Born and raised in Dallas, Boyd is a graduate of Lake Highlands High School, where he was a football player. He picked up rugby during his senior year and competed in collegiate rugby at Texas A&M University.

Boyd, a dreadlocked winger, was primarily an international sevens player, but got capped twice for the United States XV, debuting against Ireland "A" at the 2008 Churchill Cup, then featuring against the full Ireland side the following year in Santa Clara. He played his club rugby for Belmont Shore, Dallas Harlequins and Frisco Griffins.

== See also ==
- List of United States national rugby union players
