= Alumni Field (York University) =

Outdoor sports stadium in Toronto, Ontario

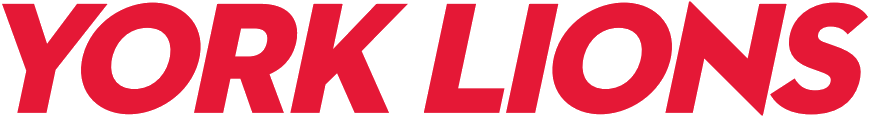

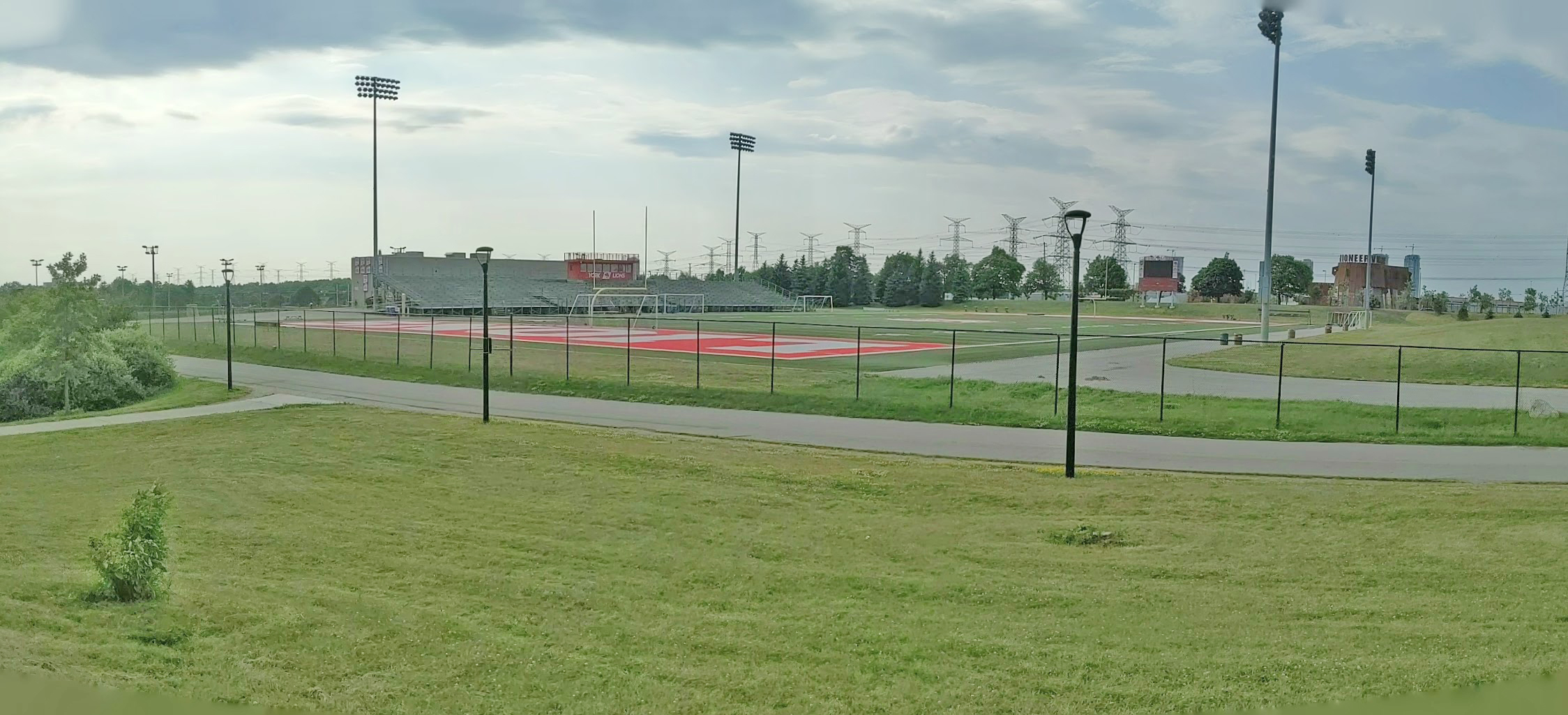
- View of the field in 2019

- Location in Toronto Location in Ontario Location in Canada
- Former names: York Stadium
- Address: Toronto, Ontario; Canada
- Coordinates: 43°46′35″N 79°30′43″W
- Owner: York University
- Operator: York University
- Capacity: 2500 + 1000 grass seating
- Type: Stadium
- Surface: FieldTurf
- Current use: Field hockey Rugby union

Construction
- Groundbreaking: 1994
- Opened: 1995; 31 years ago
- Cost: $10.5 million

Tenants
- York Lions teams: field hockey, rugby (current), football (former); Rugby Canada; Toronto Arrows (2019); Toronto Lynx (2002)

Alumni Field is a stadium located at York University's Keele Campus in Toronto, Ontario, Canada. It is the former home of the York Lions football team. Alumni Field is currently home venue to the York Lions' field hockey and rugby teams.

The stadium was known as "York Stadium" prior to 2017. The Toronto Arrows split its home games at Alumni Field and Lamport Stadium during its inaugural 2019 Major League Rugby season.

== History ==
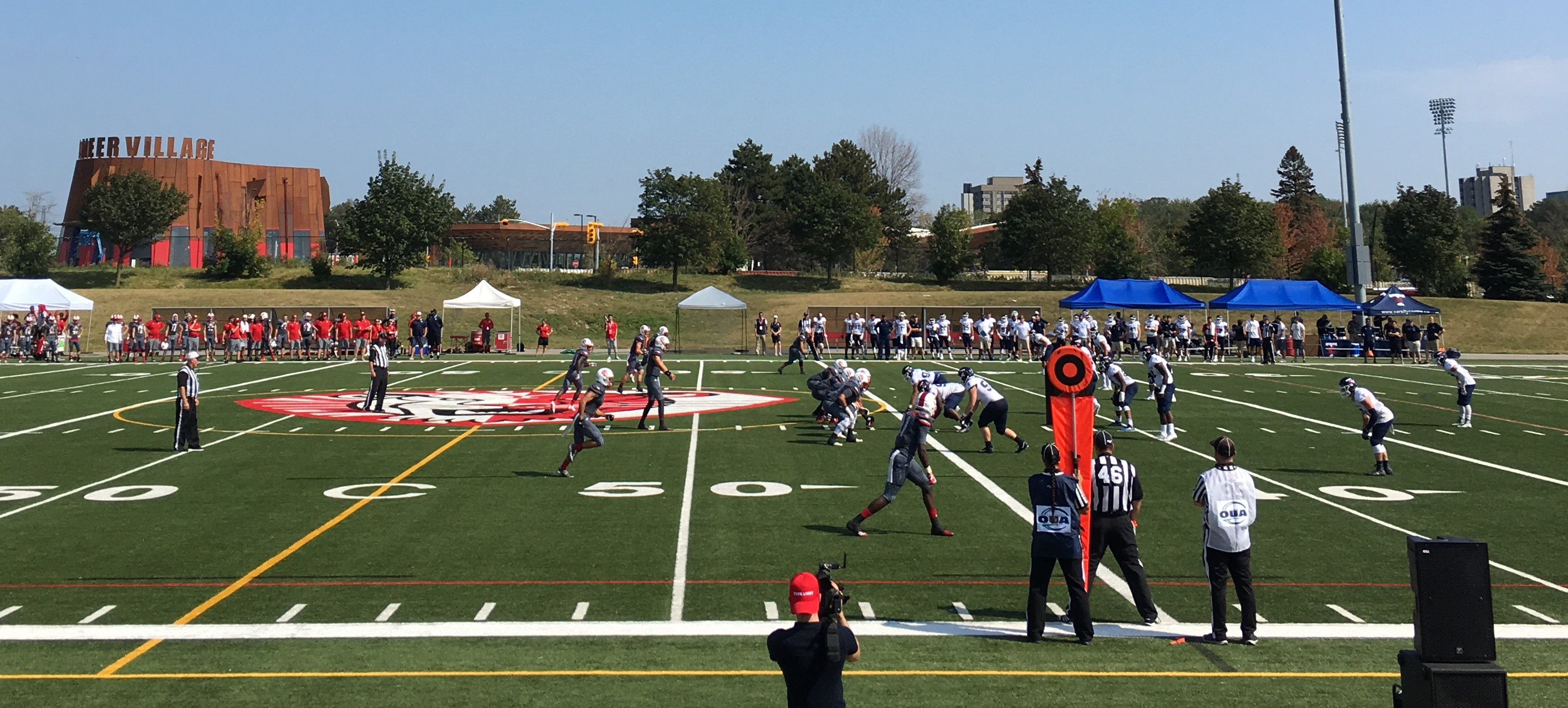
The stadium during the 2017 Red and Blue Bowl

Prior to 1995 the site was a grass field and the then Yeomen football team played home games at Esther Shiner Stadium at Bathurst Street and Finch Avenue.

There is a small bleacher seating 2,500 spectators and an enclosed booth for broadcasting/scorekeeping, concessions, washrooms and changerooms.

In 2013, the stadium's grass surface was replaced with FieldTurf.

It was planned to be the temporary home of the Canadian Premier League's York9 FC in the beginning of their inaugural 2019 season as they renovate their future home at York Lions Stadium. However, it was announced prior to the 2019 season that all games would be played at York Lions Stadium.

== Rugby union ==
=== International matches ===
Date	Opponent	Score	Home	Competition	Attendance
June 12, 1976	Barbarian F.C. (United Kingdom)	29–4	Canada	Friendly	-
August 2, 2003	Māori All Blacks	30–9	Canada	Mid-year international	
July 10, 2004	France	47–13	Canada	Mid-year international	7,600
June 11, 2005	Wales	60–3	Canada	Mid-year international	-
June 10, 2006	England A	41–11	Canada	Churchill Cup	-
May 30, 2009	Wales	32–23	Canada	Mid-year international	8,450

=== Toronto Arrows ===
The Toronto Arrows split their home games at Alumni Field of York University and Lamport Stadium during their inaugural 2019 MLR season. They were scheduled to play games at the stadium in 2020, but the season was canceled due to the COVID-19 pandemic. The team moved their home games to York Lions Stadium for the 2022 season.
