= Andrew Tiedemann =

Canada international rugby union player

- Born: Andrew Tiedemann; July 21, 1988 (age 38) St. Albert, Alberta, Canada
- Height: 183 cm (6 ft 0 in)
- Weight: 115 kg (254 lb)
- University: University of Victoria

Rugby union career
- Position: Prop
Amateur team(s)
Years	Team	Apps	(Points)
- University of Victoria
–	Castaway Wanderers RFC		
Senior career
Years	Team	Apps	(Points)
2012-13	FC Auch Gers	16	(0)
2014-15	Plymouth Albion	19	(0)
Provincial / State sides
Years	Team	Apps	(Points)
2009-	Prairie Wolf Pack		
International career
Years	Team	Apps	(Points)
2008	Canada U20	5	(0)
2009-	Canada	38	(5)

Andrew Tiedemann (born 21 July 1988) is a Canadian rugby union player. His position is prop, and he has played 11 tests for the Canada national team. Tiedemann currently plays rugby for Castaway Wanderers RFC in the British Columbia Premiership and the Prairie Wolf Pack of the Canadian Rugby Championship. Previously, Tiedemann spent time with St. Albert RFC and the University of Victoria.

== International career ==
Tiedemann had previously represented Canada at the U-17, U-19, and U-20 levels before making his debut with the senior men's squad. At the 2008 IRB Junior World Championship Tiedemann started in four of the five matches in which he played including the team's sole victory of the tournament, a 17–10 win over Fiji.

Tiedemann made his debut for the Canada national team on 30 May 2009 earning his first cap against Wales.

== Professional career ==
It was announced on 26 September 2012 that Tiedemann would be joining FC Auch Gers for the remainder of the 2012-2013 ProD2 season as medical cover.
