= Junior Sifa =

US international rugby union player

- Born: Junior Lotomau Sifa; March 24, 1983 (age 43) Faga'alu, American Samoa
- Height: 1.78 m (5 ft 10 in)
- Weight: 95 kg (209 lb)

Rugby union career
- Position: Centre
Amateur team(s)
Years	Team	Apps	(Points)
2008–2010	Midleton		
Senior career
Years	Team	Apps	(Points)
2010–2011	Nottingham	14	(10)
- Correct as of 31 December 2020
International career
Years	Team	Apps	(Points)
2008–2011	United States	8	(5)
- Correct as of 31 December 2020

Junior Lotomau Sifa (born 24 March 1983) is a former American international rugby union player who previously played in Ireland for Midleton as a centre and for Nottingham Rugby. Sifa attended Edgewater College. He made the USA squad for the 2011 Rugby World Cup. After the World Cup Sifa retired from professional rugby and moved to Perth, Australia where he began playing for the Associates Rugby Club.
