= Ata Malifa =

Samoan rugby union player (born 1985)

- Born: Ata Malifa; September 10, 1985 (age 41) American Samoa
- Height: 5 ft 10 in (1.78 m)
- Weight: 205 lb (93 kg)
- Notable relative: Nese Malifa (twin brother)

Rugby union career
- Position: Fly-half
Amateur team(s)
Years	Team	Apps	(Points)
2009	Belmont Shore		
2010–2014	Glendale Merlins		
2015	Denver Barbarians		
2016–2018	Glendale Raptors		
Senior career
Years	Team	Apps	(Points)
2016	Denver Stampede	11	(10)
2018–2020	Colorado Raptors	24	(5)
International career
Years	Team	Apps	(Points)
2009	United States	4	(5)
National sevens team
Years	Team		Comps
2009–2010	United States		

Ata Malifa (born 10 September 1985 in American Samoa) is an American rugby union fly-half. He previously played for the Colorado Raptors in Major League Rugby (MLR) and briefly for the USA Eagles.

He is the twin brother of Nese Malifa.

Malifa's family moved to Auckland, New Zealand when he was 14. he later played for Bay of Plenty.
