= Bob Casey (rugby union) =

Irish former rugby union footballer

- Born: Robert Casey; 18 July 1978 (age 48) Maynooth, Ireland
- Height: 2.02 m (6 ft 7 1/2 in)
- Weight: 125 kg (19.7 st)
- School: Blackrock College

Rugby union career
- Position: Lock
Amateur team(s)
Years	Team	Apps	(Points)
- Blackrock College
Senior career
Years	Team	Apps	(Points)
1999-2002	Leinster	37	(10)
2002-2012	London Irish	129	(25)
International career
Years	Team	Apps	(Points)
1999-2009	Ireland A	14	(5)
2000-2009	Ireland	7	(5)

Robert Casey (born 18 July 1978) is an Irish former rugby union footballer who used to play at lock and prop for London Irish until his retirement at the end of the 2011/2012 season. He was later Operations Director and then the CEO at the same club until he resigned in March 2017. Originally from Maynooth, County Kildare, he was educated at Blackrock College, a Dublin secondary school renowned for producing international rugby players. Casey is currently a consultant for Korn Ferry in Dublin.

== Club career ==
Casey joined Leinster in 1999 and played three seasons before moving to London Irish in July 2002, having previously played for Blackrock College RFC and North Kildare RFC. He was the club's Players' Player of the Season in 2003–04 and was the London Irish Supporters Club Player of the Season 2004–05 and later club captain until his retirement from playing.

== International career ==
Casey represented Ireland at Schools, U19, U21, Ireland 'A' and U25 levels. He made his senior debut against Australia in 1999. Casey was part of the Ireland team that recorded Ireland's largest win on 10 June 2000, by beating the United States 83–3. Casey also captained Ireland A team in the 2008 Churchill Cup, and was named in Declan Kidney's Autumn internationals squad for 2008, the squad for the 2009 Six Nations and the summer tour to North America in 2009. Casey has seven caps for Ireland; when he played for Ireland against Canada in May 2009, it was his first cap since 2000.

He has also played for the Barbarians.

== Charity work ==
Casey is a Director of the United Kingdom board of the Christina Noble Children's Foundation.
