= JJ Gagiano =

US international rugby union player

- Full name: Jonathan Richard Gagiano
- Born: 14 August 1985 (age 41) Cape Town, South Africa
- Height: 1.91 m (6 ft 3 in)
- Weight: 103 kg (16 st 3 lb; 227 lb)
- University: University of Cape Town
- Occupation: Frome RFC Defensive coach

Rugby union career
- Position: Second Row
- Current team: Frome RFC
Amateur team(s)
| Years | Team | Apps | (Points) |
| 2008–2010 | UCT Ikey Tigers | 25 | (15) |
Senior career
| Years | Team | Apps | (Points) |
| 2009 | Rugby Roma Olimpic | 9 | (5) |
| 2012 | Golden Lions | 5 | (0) |
| 2012 | Western Province | 2 | (0) |
- Correct as of 31 December 2020
International career
| Years | Team | Apps | (Points) |
| 2008–2011 | United States | 14 | (10) |
- Correct as of 31 December 2020

Jonathan Richard Gagiano (born 4 October 1985 in Cape Town) is a South African born, American rugby union player. Gagiano plays flanker for the USA Eagle XV side. His debut for the USA Eagles XV was in 2008 against Uruguay. He was selected to tour with the USA Eagles squad for the Autumn 2010 tour of Europe. He was a member of the USA rugby team that participated in the 2011 Rugby World Cup.

== Club ==
Gagiano played in the Varsity Cup for the University of Cape Town side known as the Ikey Tigers from 2008 to 2010. Gagiano played rugby for Eastern Province Kings in South Africa during the 2010 season. In March 2012 Gagiano signed with the Golden Lions for the remainder of the 2012 season.
