= Alipate Tuilevuka =

US international rugby union player

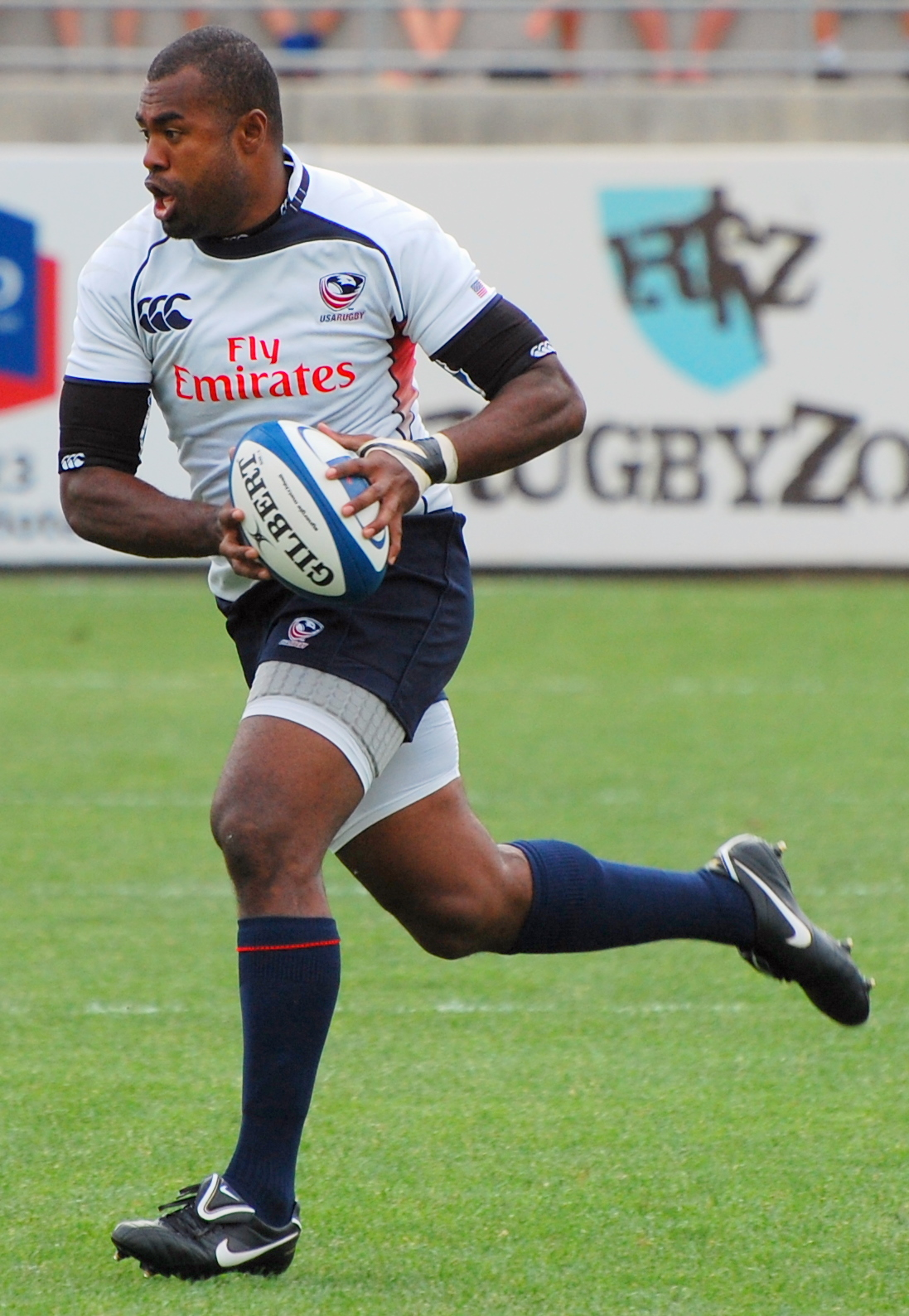
- Born: Alipate Tuilevuka; July 11, 1980 (age 46) Suva, Fiji
- Height: 1.90 m (6 ft 3 in)
- Weight: 107 kg (236 lb)
- Notable relative: Seta Tuilevuka (brother)

Rugby union career
- Position(s): Fly-half, Center
Amateur team(s)
Years	Team	Apps	(Points)
2005–2006	BYU		
2007–2008	Galwegians RFC		
2009	Provo Steelers		
2010–2012	OPSB		
- Correct as of 2 April 2021
Senior career
Years	Team	Apps	(Points)
2007	Connacht	0	(0)
International career
Years	Team	Apps	(Points)
2006–2010	United States	19	(12)
- Correct as of 1 April 2021
Coaching career
- Years: Team
- 2019–2021: Seattle Saracens
- 2021–Present: Seattle Seawolves
- Correct as of 3 May 2021

Alipate Tuilevuka ("Pate" for short) (born 11 July 1980 in Fiji) is a former American rugby union player who played his club career with Old Puget Sound Beach. Tuilevuka played the wing, centre or flyhalf. He is the current head coach for the Seattle Seawolves of Major League Rugby (MLR).

== College ==
Tuilevuka played for Brigham Young University in 2006 where he achieve All-American honors.

== Club career ==
Following his collegiate career with BYU, Tuilevuka moved to Ireland where he played for Galwegians RFC. Having made appearances for the 'A' side, Tuilevuka was included in the Connacht match day squad for their match against the Glasgow Warriors on 5 October 2007. However, he failed to made an appearance for the side. He was a member of the 2012 Old Puget Sound Beach team that lost to New York Athletic Club RFC in the Super League final, having gone undefeated in the regular season.

== International ==
Tuilevuka achieved the last of his ten caps in a victory over Russia on 5 June 2010. He was selected to tour with the USA Eagles squad for the Autumn 2010 tour of Europe, during which started on the wing against a Scotland A side.

== Coaching career ==
Having worked as a skills coach with the Seawolves since 2019, in April 2021 it was announced that Tuilevuka would become the director of rugby as well as oversee the academy and Pacific Northwest rugby development.
