= Tim Usasz =

US international rugby union player

Timothy David Usasz
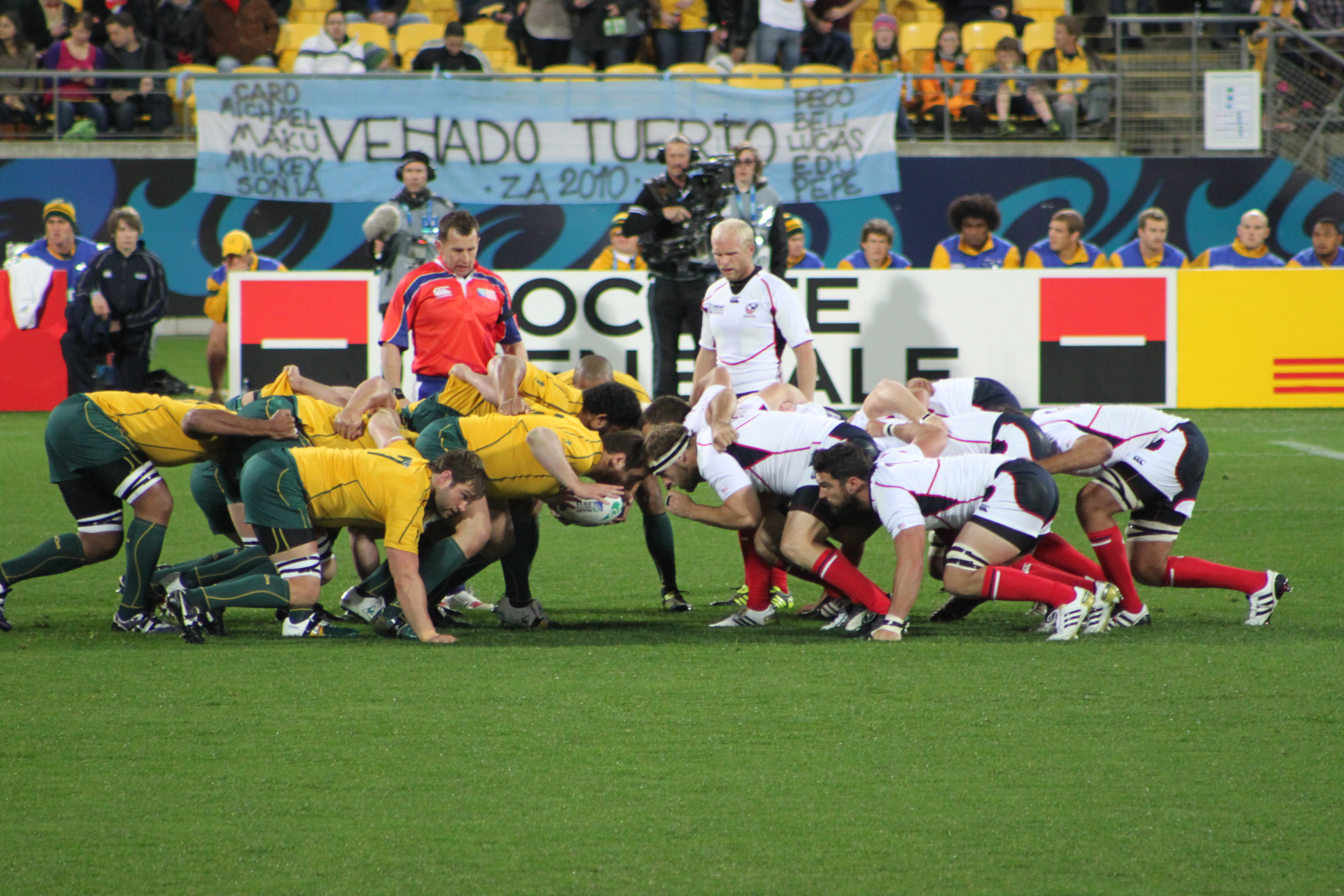
- Born: Timothy David Usasz; 21 June 1983 (age 43) Brisbane, Queensland, Australia
- Height: 1.70 m (5 ft 7 in)
- Weight: 85 kg (187 lb; 13.4 st)

Rugby union career
- Position: Scrumhalf
Senior career
Years	Team	Apps	(Points)
2007–2011	Nottingham RFC	91	(50)
International career
Years	Team	Apps	(Points)
2009–2011	United States	19	(10)
- Correct as of 31 December 2020

Timothy Usasz (born 21 June 1983) is a retired Australian-born American international rugby union player who played domestically for Nottingham as a scrum-half.

== Career ==
His debut for the USA Eagles XV was against Ireland at Santa Clara on 31 May 2009. He was a member of the USA squad that played in the 2011 World Cup in New Zealand. During the World Cup he was made captain for the USA's game against the team of his birth, the Australian Wallabies.
