= Chris Biller =

American rugby union player

- Born: October 11, 1985 (age 41) Concord, California, U.S.
- Height: 5 ft 11 in (1.80 m)
- Weight: 230 lb (104 kg)
- University: University of California, Berkeley
- Occupation: Professional rugby union player

Rugby union career
- Position: Hooker
Amateur team(s)
Years	Team	Apps	(Points)
2009–11, 2013–	San Francisco Golden Gate		
Senior career
Years	Team	Apps	(Points)
2011–2012	Bath Rugby	3	(0)
2012	Northampton Saints	0	(0)
- Correct as of January 31, 2014
International career
Years	Team	Apps	(Points)
2009–2013	United States	28	(0)
- Correct as of January 31, 2014

Chris Biller (born October 10, 1985, in Concord, California) is an American rugby union player who currently plays for San Francisco Golden Gate RFC.

Chris began playing rugby for San Francisco Golden Gate, following his collegiate career with the California Golden Bears. He was named to the Collegiate All-Americans before his debut on the Men's National Team vs Ireland in May 2009 which he scored a try.

In November 2011 Bath Rugby signed him on a short-term contract to cover for injured players. Biller found little playing time with Bath as injured players quickly recovered. His contract expired in February 2012 and in March 2012 Biller signed a short-term contract with Northampton Saints. Biller then moved back to California to play with his former club, SFGG for the 2013 season.
