= John van der Giessen =

US international rugby union player

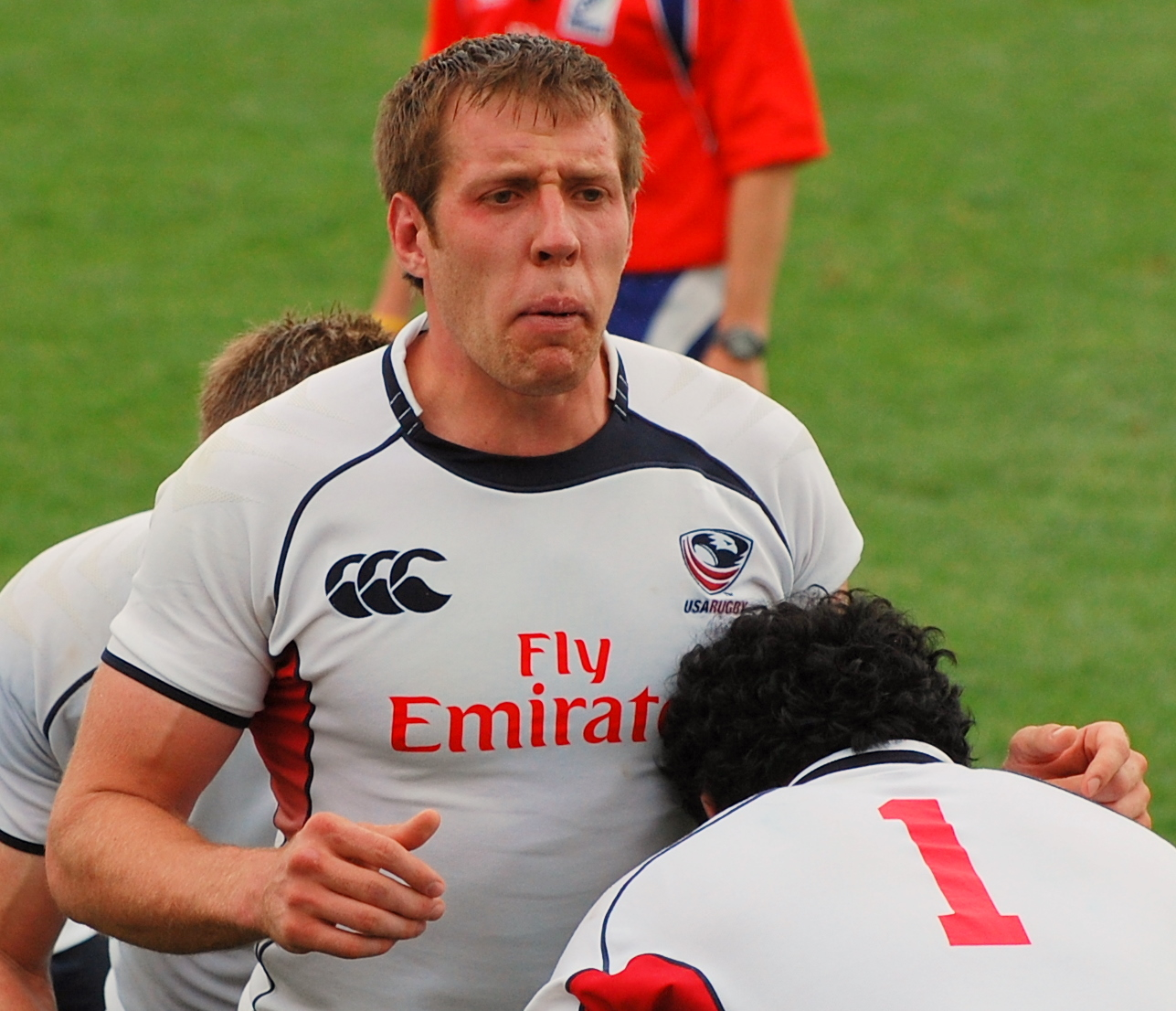
- John van der Giessen preparing for a lineout against Russia during the 2010 Churchill Cup
- Born: May 6, 1982 (age 44) Jerome, Idaho, U.S.
- Height: 1.98 m (6 ft 6 in)
- Weight: 114 kg (251 lb)

Rugby union career
- Position: Lock
- Current team: Retired
Senior career
Years	Team	Apps	(Points)
2009–2010	SC Albi	7	(0)
2010–2011	Bath	3	(0)
2011	Utah Warriors		
- Correct as of 31 December 2020
International career
Years	Team	Apps	(Points)
2008–2011	United States	21	(5)

John van der Giessen (born May 6, 1982) is an American former rugby union player. He played lock for the USA Eagle XV side. John earned a captaincy role for the USA and represented the side in the 2007 and 2011 Rugby World Cup. Van der Giessen played professional rugby in the English Premiership and French Top 14. John has since retired.

== Youth ==
Van der Giessen was born in Jerome, Idaho. He first started playing rugby in September 2001. He had two training sessions and started his first match that weekend at the 25th Annual University of Idaho Alumni Tournament. The founder of U of I Rugby, Joe McGurkin, and a former U of I player and friend, Conrad Breithbach watched the match. Afterwards Mr. McGurkin told him he could go as far as he wanted in rugby if he stuck with it.

He was a University of Idaho Rugby Captain from 2004–2005. He graduated from Idaho in 2004.

== International ==
Van der Giessen was selected to come to the Rugby World Cup Training Camp and was named to the NA4 Hawks Team. Initially named as the reserve for the 2007 Rugby World Cup, Van der Giessen joined the team in France for its last two matches, following the injury of veteran USA lock Luke Gross, but VDG did not see any playing time. Van der Giessen's debut for his country was in the 2008 Churchill Cup against England Saxons.

He was selected to tour with the USA Eagles squad for the Autumn 2010 tour of Europe, and was captain of the USA Eagles. Van der Giessen played in the 2011 Rugby World Cup, and achieved the most lineout steals (5) of any player in the tournament, an impressive feat considering the US was knocked out of the tournament after 4 matches, whereas several other teams played 5-7 matches. Van der Giessen's best match in the lineout was the USA's win against Russia, where VDG won 9 lineouts, including 4 steals on Russia's lineout.

== Club career ==
Van der Giessen has played club rugby in New Zealand, Australia, France, England, and now in the United States.

In 2006 Van der Giessen was selected for the 2006 NPC Hawkes Bay Reserve side, and has also played with the University of Queensland in Australia. VDG returned to the US and played with various clubs, including the Santa Barbara Rugby Club and the Denver Barbarians.

Van der Giessen played his club rugby with SC Albi of the Top 14 in France during the 2009-10 season, before moving to Bath Rugby in the English Premiership in the fall of 2010. Bath coaches and executives have praised Van der Giessen's athleticism and good lineout skills. He started several games for Bath, including a Heineken Cup match.

Van der Giessen left Bath in February 2011 to return to the United States. He played with the Utah Warriors in the US Rugby Super League in 2011.
