= Nic Johnson =

US international rugby union player

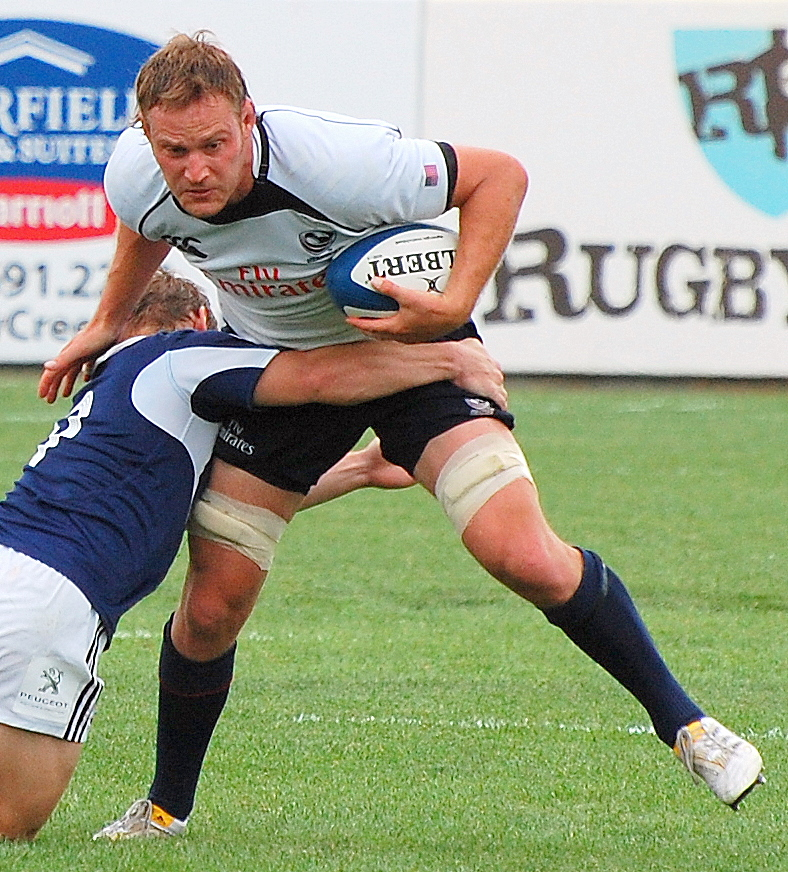
- Born: Nicholas Johnson; April 15, 1983 (age 43) Salt Lake City, Utah
- Height: 1.93 m (6 ft 4 in)
- Weight: 113 kg (249 lb; 17.8 st)

Rugby union career
- Position(s): Flanker, Number 8
- Current team: Glendale Raptors
Amateur team(s)
Years	Team	Apps	(Points)
2012	Glendale Raptors		
Senior career
Years	Team	Apps	(Points)
- Denver Barbarians
International career
Years	Team	Apps	(Points)
2009	United States U20	4	(5)
2009–2011	United States	18	(0)
- Correct as of 31 December 2020

Nicholas Johnson (born April 15, 1983) is an American rugby union player. Johnson played flanker and Number 8 for the USA Eagles. He was selected to tour with the USA Eagles squad for the Autumn 2010 tour of Europe, and represented the US at the 2011 Rugby World Cup, where he started three matches.

He started playing rugby around 20 years old. He began playing with the USA Sevens in 2007. His debut for his country was against Ireland at Santa Clara on May 31, 2009. On the club level, Johnson has played with ORSU Jesters, where he was named young player of the year in 2004-05, and with the Glendale Raptors.

Johnson's uncle, Fred Paoli, played 20 matches for the USA Eagles from 1982 to 1991.
