= Chris Wyles =

American rugby union player (born 1983)

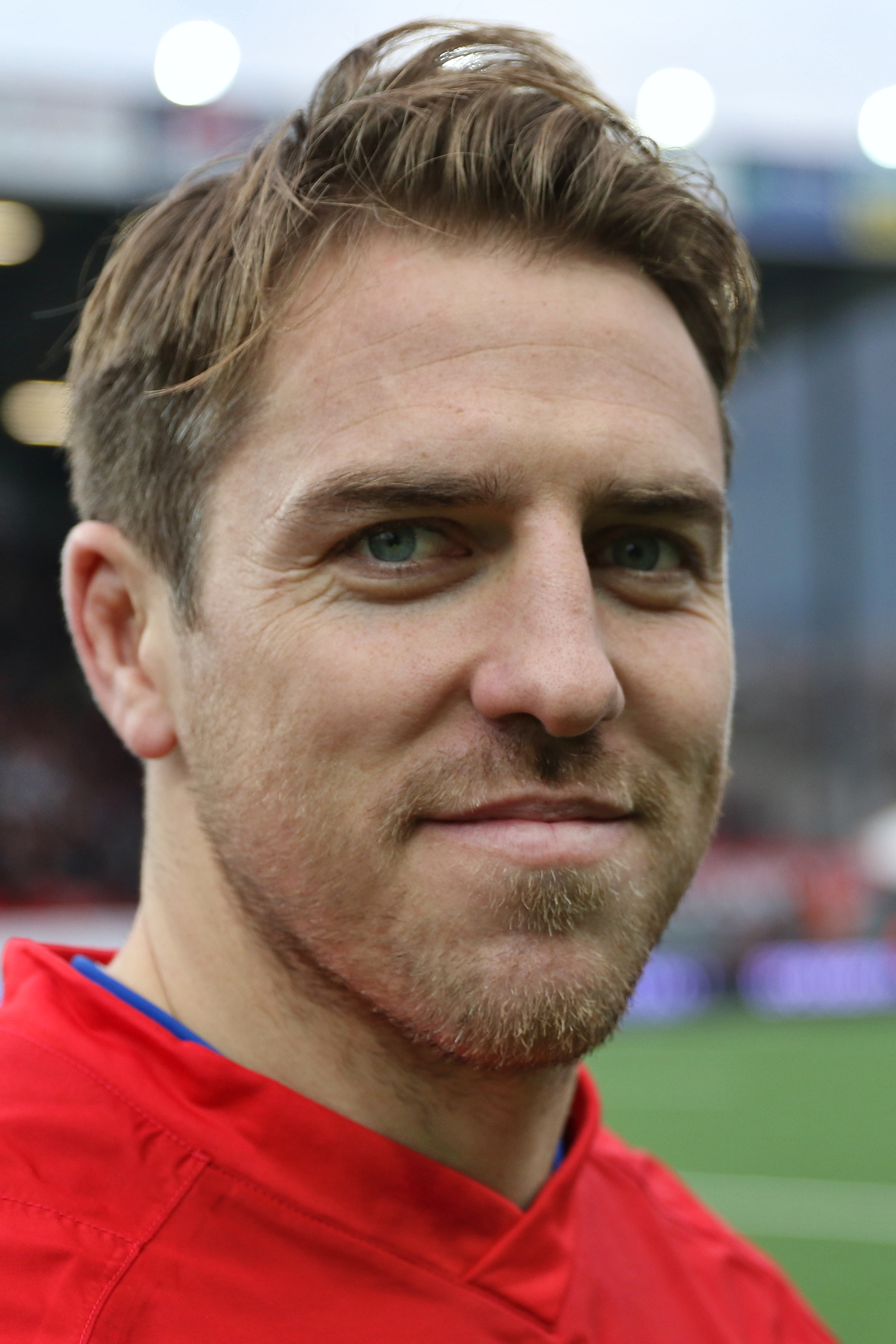
- Wyles in December 2015
- Born: Chris Wyles; 13 September 1983 (age 43) Stamford, Connecticut, U.S.
- Height: 1.83 m (6 ft 0 in)
- Weight: 93 kg (14 st 9 lb; 205 lb)

Rugby union career
- Position(s): Fullback, Wing, Centre
Senior career
Years	Team	Apps	(Points)
2004–2006	Nottingham	40	(105)
2006–2007	Northampton Saints	9	(15)
2008–2018	Saracens	254	(375)
- Correct as of 26 May 2018
International career
Years	Team	Apps	(Points)
2007–2015	United States	54	(222)
- Correct as of 26 May 2018
National sevens team
Years	Team		Comps
2007–2009	United States		13

Chris Wyles (born 13 September 1983) is a former American-English rugby union player. Until his retirement in January 2016, Wyles represented the United States men's national rugby sevens team in three World Cups in 2007, 2011, and 2015. He was captain of the U.S. men's national rugby union team in the 2015 Rugby World Cup and for USA Sevens, a Rugby League World Sevens team, in both the 2007–2008 and 2008–2009 seasons. In 2015, he was selected for the USA Olympic team, where he competed for USA Sevens in the 2016 Summer Olympics in Rio de Janeiro.

In 2008, he joined Saracens in the English Premiership. In over 200 appearances, he has helped his club win four Aviva Premiership Champion titles in 2011, 2015, 2016, and 2018, and two European Champions Cup in 2016 and 2017. He played three positions, wing, full back, and centre, and is the most capped fullback in U.S. national team history.

== Early life and education ==
Wyles was born in Stamford, Connecticut, and lived mostly in Allentown, Pennsylvania. When he was 11 years old, his parents relocated to their native United Kingdom. He then attended Haileybury and Imperial Service College in Hertford and then studied politics at the University of Nottingham.

== Career ==
Wyles' first professional club was the championship team, Nottingham RFC. He then played for Northampton Saints, in the 2006-2007 season, when he caught the eye of the USA Eagles coaching team, which led to his involvement in the IRB Sevens World Series and the 2007 Rugby World Cup in France.

Wyles joined Saracens in summer of 2008, after impressive performances in the 2007 Rugby World Cup. Eddie Jones, who was on the Springboks coaching team, saw Wyles' potential and when Jones became Director of Rugby at Saracens, he brought him to the club. Wyles debuted for Saracens on 12 September 2008 against the Sale Sharks.

In the 2009-2010 season he was a regular starter on the wing, playing in the Saracens team that took on Leicester in the final of the English Premiership. For his performances during the 2009/10 season, Wyles was nominated for Player of the Season by Brendan Venter.

Following on from that season, Wyles became a key figure in the successful 2010-11 Premiership winning side, beating Leicester 22-18 in the Final.

In the 2014-15 season, Wyles scored 12 tries, tying for second-highest scorer in the English Premiership. One of these tries helped Saracens to a second Premiership title by defeating Bath 28-16 in the final.

In the 2015-2016 season, Saracens won the Premiership Title for a third time, defeating Exeter 28-20. Wyles scored in the final for the second year running, and won the European Champions Cup, 21-9, against Racing 92.

In the 2016-17 season, Saracens won the European Championship for a second year in a row, defeathig Clermont Auvergne 28-17, in Edinburgh. Wyles made his 50th European appearance during this season.

Wyles has contributed over 60 tries for his club with 23 of them scored in European Competition.

As of the 2017-18 season, Wyles holds the record for most tries scored in the Premiership semifinal rounds with five. Wyles went on to score two tries in the final as Saracens claimed their fourth Premiership title in eight years with a 27-10 win over Exeter at Twickenham; these were his third and fourth tries scored in a victorious Premiership final after getting one in 2015 and one in 2016.

Wyles retired in 2018. He then began working for Wolfpack lager, with former team-mate Alistair Hargreaves.

== International career ==
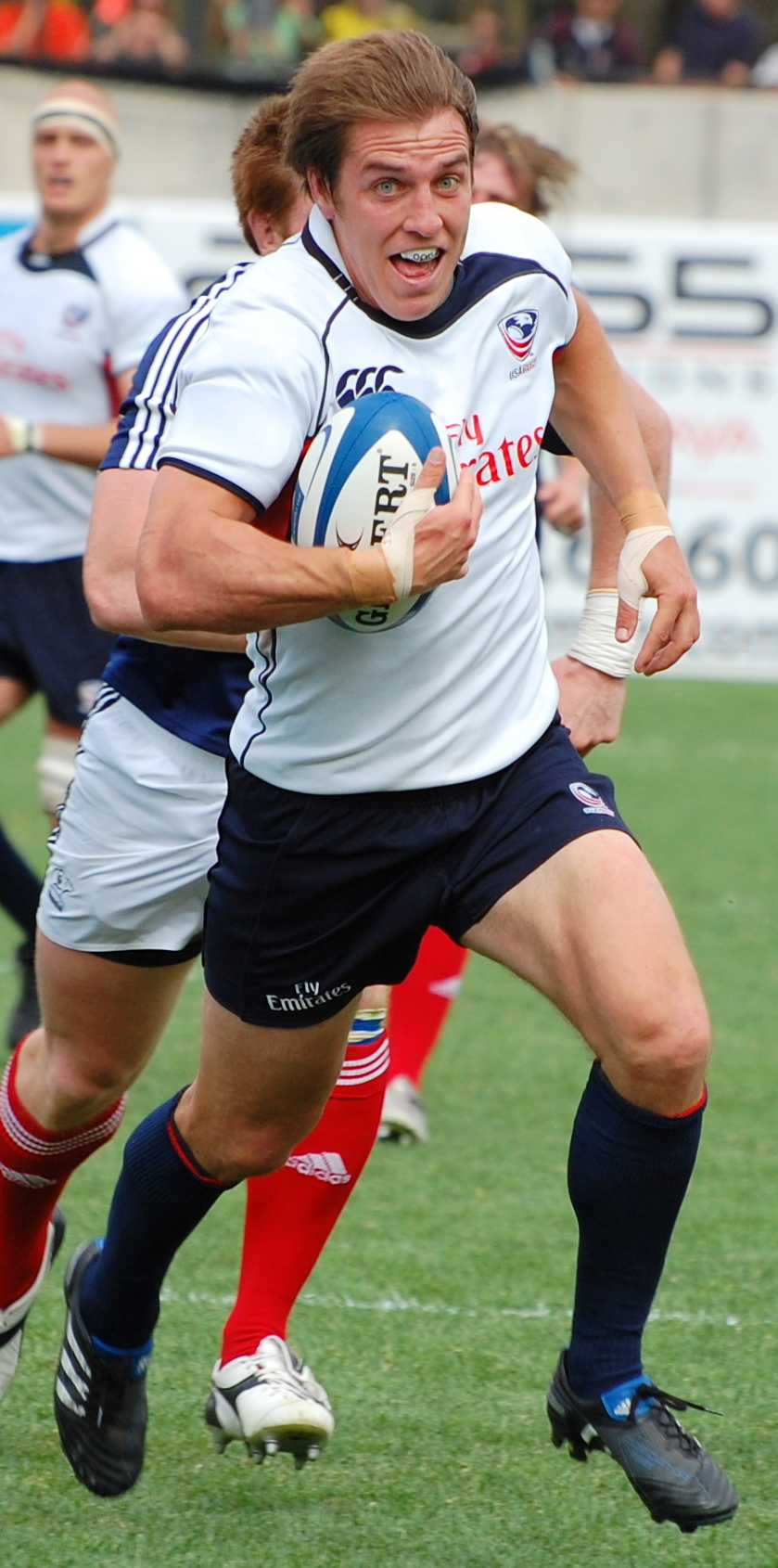
Wyles playing with the USA Eagles during the 2010 Churchill Cup vs. Russia

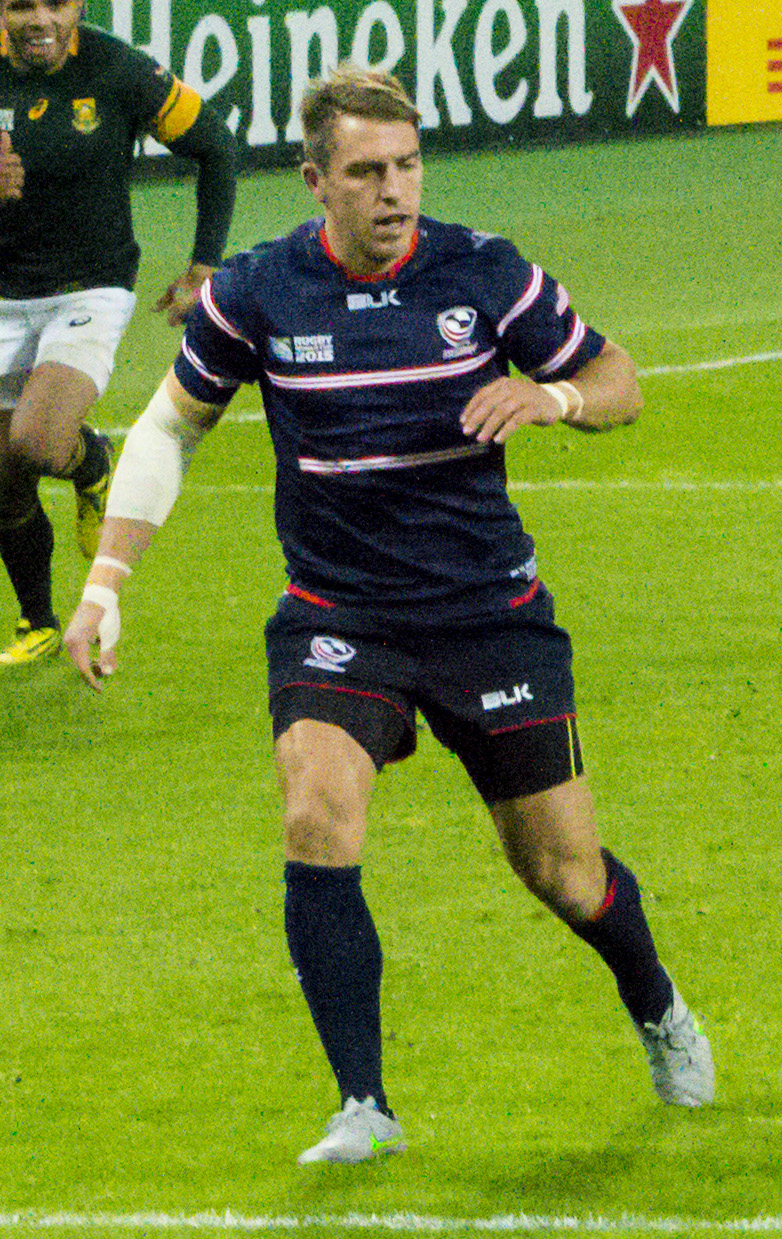
Wyles playing for the Eagles during the 2015 World Cup

Wyles first represented the USA National Rugby Sevens team at the 2007 Hong Kong Sevens. From there, he went on to captain the USA team in the IRB Sevens World Series. During his time with the USA National Sevens team, he scored an impressive 54 tries in 13 tournaments.

Wyles earned his first XV's cap at the Churchill Cup in 2007 against England Saxons before going on to play Fullback for the Eagles in the 2007 Rugby World Cup in France. His performances in the World Cup led him to be named the American Rugby News 'Player of the Year'. He continued to be a regular starter at Fullback for the USA National team after the 2007 World Cup.

In 2009, Wyles was included in the USA Eagles team of the decade by RugbyMag, a leading US rugby publication. Wyles continued his form for the USA team, playing in the 2011 Rugby World Cup in New Zealand, finishing as the Eagles top points scorer. His performances for club and country won him the 2012 Player of the Year award for American rugby.

Wyles participated in his third and final World Cup in England in 2015. He was appointed Captain of the USA National team for this event.

In January 2016, Wyles announced his retirement from international XVs duty with the Eagles. He had amassed 222 points for the National team over his 54 cap career, scoring 16 tries and 142 points with the boot. His future intent was to focus on the remaining years of his contract with Saracens FC in England and to push for selection to the USA Olympic Team for the Rio 2016 Olympic Summer Games.

In August 2016, Wyles was a member of USA National Sevens Team in the Summer 2016 Olympics held in Rio de Janeiro.

== International tries ==
Try	Opposing team	Venue	Competition	Date	Result	Score	Ref.
1	South Africa	Stade de la Mosson, Montpellier	2007 Rugby World Cup	30 September 2007	Lost	15–64	
2	Uruguay	Rio Tinto Stadium, Sandy	Test match	8 November 2008	Won	43–9	
3	Japan	Chichibunomiya Stadium, Tokyo	Test match	22 November 2008	Lost	17–32	
4	Russia	Infinity Park, Glendale	2010 Churchill Cup	5 June 2010	Won	39–22	
5	Russia	Infinity Park, Glendale	2010 Churchill Cup	5 June 2010	Won	39–22	
6	Italy	Trafalgar Park, Nelson	2011 Rugby World Cup	27 September 2011	Lost	10–27	
7	Russia	Eirias Stadium, Colwyn Bay	2012 International Rugby Series	9 November 2012	Won	40–26	
8	Romania	Stadionul Arcul de Triumf, Bucharest	Test match	24 November 2012	Won	34–3	
9	Romania	Stadionul Arcul de Triumf, Bucharest	Test match	24 November 2012	Won	34–3	
10	Japan	Chichibunomiya Stadium, Tokyo	2013 Pacific Nations Cup	23 June 2013	Lost	20–38	
11	Georgia	Rustavi	Test match	16 November 2013	Won	25–23	
12	Russia	Allianz Park, London	Test match	23 November 2013	Won	28–7	
13	Uruguay	Estadio Charrúa, Montevideo	2015 Rugby World Cup qualifier	22 March 2014	Draw	27–27	
14	Canada	Bonney Field, Sacramento	2014 Pacific Nations Cup	21 June 2014	Won	38–35	
15	Samoa	Falmer Stadium, Brighton	2015 Rugby World Cup	20 September 2015	Lost	16–25	
16	Japan	Kingsholm, Gloucester	2015 Rugby World Cup	11 October 2015	Lost	18–28	
