= Kevin Swiryn =

US international rugby union player

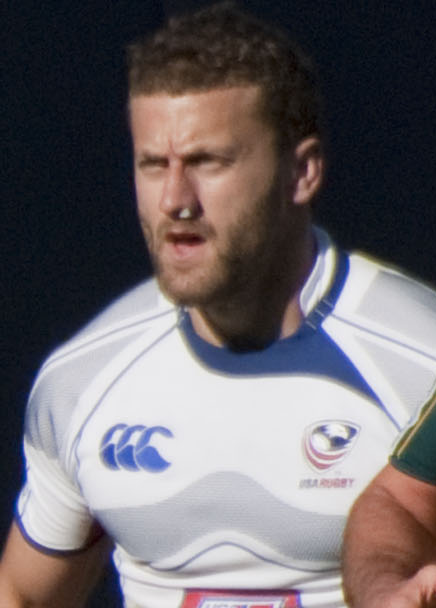
- Swiryn in 2009
- Born: Kevin Swiryn; December 16, 1984 (age 41) San Jose, California, U.S.
- Height: 1.83 m (6 ft 0 in)
- Weight: 93 kg (205 lb; 14.6 st)

Rugby union career
- Position(s): Centre, Wing
Amateur team(s)
Years	Team	Apps	(Points)
- Seattle Saracens
Senior career
Years	Team	Apps	(Points)
2010–2012	Agen	20	(25)
- Correct as of January 24, 2014
International career
Years	Team	Apps	(Points)
2009–2011	United States	13	(30)
- Correct as of September 23, 2011
National sevens team
Years	Team		Comps
2008–2016	United States		11
- Correct as of 30 January 2020
Coaching career
- Years: Team
- 2013: Serevi Rugby

Kevin Swiryn (born December 16, 1984) is an American rugby union player, who played professionally for Agen in the French Top 14. Swiryn played at both centre and wing.

== Early life ==
Swiryn was born in San Jose, California. He started playing rugby when he was 19 years old after the American football program at Saint Mary's College of California was cut. He went on to be named to the All-American Team, where he captained the squad in 2008.

== Professional career ==
Swiryn's national team debut was on May 31, 2009 against Ireland. He was selected to tour with the United States national rugby union team for the Autumn 2010 tour of Europe. He also made the U.S. squad for the 2011 Rugby World Cup. Swiryn temporarily retired at the end of 2011-12 Top 14 season due to persistent injuries, but returned a couple of years later. Swiryn also played for the United States national rugby sevens team. He came back to international duties in 2015 with the U.S. national rugby sevens team during their Olympic run, ahead of the 2016 Rio Games.
