= 2005–06 Heineken Cup pool stage =

- Season: 2005–06 Heineken Cup
- Date: 21 October 2005 – 22 January 2006

Qualifiers
- Seed 1: (France) Toulouse
- Seed 2: (France) Biarritz
- Seed 3: (England) Leicester Tigers
- Seed 4: (Ireland) Munster
- Seed 5: (France) Perpignan
- Seed 6: (England) Bath
- Seed 7: (England) Sale Sharks
- Seed 8: (Ireland) Leinster

The 2005–06 Heineken Cup was contested by 24 teams from England, France, Ireland, Italy, Scotland and Wales, divided into six pools of four teams each. Each team would play the others in their pool on a home-and-away basis, with four points awarded for each win and two points for a draw. Bonus points were also awarded to teams who scored four or more tries in a match and/or lost by a margin of seven points or fewer. The team with the most points in each group at the end of the pool stage qualified directly for the knockout phase, joined by the two-second-placed teams with the most points.

== Pool 1 ==
Team	P	W	D	L	Tries for	Tries against	Try diff	Points for	Points against	Points diff	TB	LB	Pts
(Ireland) Munster (4)	6	5	0	1	22	6	+16	186	87	+99	3	0	23
(England) Sale Sharks (7)	6	5	0	1	17	9	+8	159	84	+75	3	0	23
(Wales) Newport Gwent Dragons	6	1	0	5	14	20	−6	99	168	−69	1	1	6
(France) Castres	6	1	0	5	8	26	−18	90	195	−105	1	1	6

21 October 2005
19:30

Sale Sharks (England)	27–13	(Ireland) Munster
Try: Martens 58' c Robinson 77' m Con: Hodgson; Pen: Hodgson (5) 3', 20', 40+4', 51', 80+8'	Report	Try: Sheahan 34' c Con: O'Gara; Pen: O'Gara (2) 11', 47'

Edgeley Park, Stockport
Attendance: 10,704
Referee: Joël Jutge (France)

22 October 2005
18:15

Castres Olympique (France)	29–24	(Wales) Newport Gwent Dragons
Try: Roumieau 16' c Milford (2) 24' c, 48' c Marticorena 58' m Con: Marticorena (3); Pen: Marticorena 42'	Report	Try: Cooper 54' c Wyatt (2) 64' c, 77' c Con: Warlow (3); Pen: Warlow 23'

Stade Pierre-Antoine, Castres
Attendance: 6,451
Referee: Alain Rolland (Ireland)

28 October 2005
19:30

Newport Gwent Dragons (Wales)	11–38	(England) Sale Sharks
Try: Wyatt 47' m Pen: Warlow (2) 21', 35'	Report	Try: Hodgson 11' c Cueto 27' c Larrechea 36' c I. Fernández Lobbe 75' c Seveali'i 80+3' c Con: Hodgson (5); Pen: Hodgson 59'

Rodney Parade, Newport
Attendance: 7,327
Referee: Christophe Berdos (France)

29 October 2005
17:15

Munster (Ireland)	42–16	(France) Castres Olympique
Try: O'Callaghan 5' c Flannery 15' c Horgan 24' m Kelly 64' c Halstead 72' c Con: O'Gara (4); Pen: O'Gara (2) 52', 58'; Manning 80+7'	Report	Try: Teulet 30' c Con: Marticorena; Pen: Marticorena (3) 1', 14', 49'

Thomond Park, Limerick
Attendance: 13,500
Referee: Dave Pearson (England)

9 December 2005
20:30

Castres Olympique (France)	16–20	(England) Sale Sharks
Try: Capo Ortega 21' c Con: Teulet; Pen: Teulet (3) 52', 56', 62'	Report	Try: Robinson 40+3' c White 45' c Con: Hodgson (2); Pen: Hodgson (2) 15', 66'

Stade Pierre-Antoine, Castres
Attendance: 6,500
Referee: Alan Lewis (Ireland)

10 December 2005
13:00

Newport Gwent Dragons (Wales)	8–24	(Ireland) Munster
Try: Chapman 80+6' m Pen: Warlow 40+5'	Report	Try: Leamy 36' m Horan 63' c Con: O'Gara; Pen: O'Gara (2) 14', 40+2'; Drop: Lawlor 10'; O'Gara 24'

Rodney Parade, Newport
Attendance: 8,323
Referee: Tony Spreadbury (England)

16 December 2005
20:00

Sale Sharks (England)	35–3	(France) Castres Olympique
Try: Chabal (2) 39' c, 42' c Robinson 45' c Todd 80' m Con: Hodgson (3); Pen: Hodgson (3) 5', 15', 19'	Report	Pen: Teulet 14'

Edgeley Park, Stockport
Attendance: 9,246
Referee: Malcolm Changleng (Scotland)

17 December 2005
17:15

Munster (Ireland)	30–18	(Wales) Newport Gwent Dragons
Try: O'Driscoll 17' c Foley 47' c Flannery 80' c Con: O'Gara (3); Pen: O'Gara (3) 7', 70', 73'	Report	Try: Jones 28' m Morgan 65' c Con: Sweeney; Pen: Sweeney (2) 40+4', 64'

Thomond Park, Limerick
Attendance: 13,200
Referee: Chris White (England)

13 January 2006
20:40

Castres Olympique (France)	9–46	(Ireland) Munster
Pen: Marticorena (3) 2', 40+3', 40+7'	Report	Try: Horan 32' m Payne 37' m Kelly 42' c O'Connell (2) 49' c, 56' m O'Leary (2) 67' c, 80' c Con: O'Gara (3); Manning; Pen: O'Gara 10'

Stade Pierre-Antoine, Castres
Attendance: 9,423
Referee: Chris White (England)

15 January 2006
13:00

Sale Sharks (England)	30–10	(Wales) Newport Gwent Dragons
Try: Chabal 11' c Cueto (2) 27' m, 42' c Hodgson 57' m Con: Hodgson (2); Pen: Hodgson (2) 5', 13'	Report	Try: Fussell 20' m Tuʻipulotu 54' m

Edgeley Park, Stockport
Attendance: 8,481
Referee: Rob Dickson (Scotland)

21 January 2006
17:15

Newport Gwent Dragons (Wales)	28–17	(France) Castres Olympique
Try: Fussell 17' m Warlow 22' m Sweeney 29' m Ringer 39' m Gough 57' m Pen: Warlow 80+1'	Report	Try: Fior 65' c Christophers 75' c Con: Teulet (2); Pen: Teulet 50'

Rodney Parade, Newport
Attendance: 4,475
Referee: Malcolm Changleng (Scotland)

21 January 2006
17:15

Munster (Ireland)	31–9	(England) Sale Sharks
Try: Foley 13' c Dowling 28' c Murphy 36' c Wallace 80+2' c Con: O'Gara (4); Pen: O'Gara	Report	Pen: Hodgson (3) 11', 16', 40+6'

Thomond Park, Limerick
Attendance: 13,200
Referee: Joël Jutge (France)

== Pool 2 ==
Team	P	W	D	L	Tries for	Tries against	Try diff	Points for	Points against	Points diff	TB	LB	Pts
(France) Perpignan (5)	6	5	0	1	20	5	+15	160	52	+108	2	1	23
(England) Leeds Tykes	6	4	0	2	19	9	+10	143	91	+52	3	1	20
(Wales) Cardiff Blues	6	3	0	3	16	18	−2	128	145	−17	3	0	15
(Italy) Calvisano	6	0	0	6	4	27	−23	48	191	−143	0	0	0

22 October 2005
13:00

Cardiff Blues (Wales)	40–13	(England) Leeds Tykes
Try: Sowden-Taylor 50' c G. Williams (2) 61' c, 73' c Yapp 69' c Con: N. Robinson (4); Pen: N. Robinson (4) 8', 34', 43', 80+4'	Report	Try: Snyman 18' c Con: Ross; Pen: Ross 38'; Drop: Marshall 24'

Cardiff Arms Park, Cardiff
Attendance: 8,522
Referee: Rob Dickson (Scotland)

22 October 2005
14:00

Calvisano (Italy)	6–25	(France) Perpignan
Pen: Kruger (2) 29', 40'	Report	Try: Manas 22' m Vaki 47' c Debaty 68' c Con: N. Laharrague; Pez; Pen: N. Laharrague 53'; Drop: N. Laharrague 58'

Centro Sportivo San Michele, Calvisano
Attendance: 1,800
Referee: Malcolm Changleng (Scotland)

28 October 2005
20:00

Leeds Tykes (England)	33–16	(Italy) Calvisano
Try: Rawlinson 35' m Palmer 43' c Gerber 72' m Stimpson 78' c Con: Ross (2); Pen: Ross (3) 4', 6', 59'	Report	Try: Van Schalkwyk 37' c Con: Kruger; Pen: Kruger (3) 12', 40+7', 50'

Headingley Rugby Stadium, Leeds
Attendance: 2,625
Referee: Eric Darrière (France)

28 October 2005
20:30

Perpignan (France)	37–14	(Wales) Cardiff Blues
Try: Manas 19' m Durand 26' c Hume 40' c Dawai Naulu 53' c Tonița 59' m Con: N. Laharrague (3); Pen: N. Laharrague (2) 5', 39'	Report	Try: J. Robinson 65' c R. Thomas 75' c Con: N. Robinson (2)

Stade Aimé Giral, Perpignan
Attendance: 13,000
Referee: Alan Lewis (Ireland)

10 December 2005
14:00

Calvisano (Italy)	10–25	(Wales) Cardiff Blues

Centro Sportivo San Michele
Attendance: 4,500

11 December 2005
14:30

Leeds Tykes (England)	21–20	(France) Perpignan

Headingley Rugby Stadium, Leeds
Attendance: 3,053

17 December 2005
15:00

Cardiff Blues (Wales)	43–16	(Italy) Calvisano

Cardiff Arms Park
Attendance: 11,764

17 December 2005
18:30

Perpignan (France)	12–8	(England) Leeds Tykes

Stade Aimé Giral
Attendance: 11,800

14 January 2006
13:00

Cardiff Blues (Wales)	3–21	(France) Perpignan

Cardiff Arms Park
Attendance: 11,462

15 January 2006

Calvisano (Italy)	0–20	(England) Leeds Tykes

Centro Sportivo San Michele

22 January 2006
13:00

Leeds Tykes (England)	48–3	(Wales) Cardiff Blues

Headingley Rugby Stadium, Leeds
Attendance: 7,144

22 January 2006
14:00

Perpignan (France)	45–0	(Italy) Calvisano

Stade Aimé Giral
Attendance: 11,500

== Pool 3 ==
Team	P	W	D	L	Tries for	Tries against	Try diff	Points for	Points against	Points diff	TB	LB	Pts
(England) Leicester Tigers (3)	6	5	0	1	19	10	+9	179	111	+68	3	1	24
(France) Stade Français	6	4	0	2	16	7	+9	148	98	+50	2	2	20
(Wales) Ospreys	6	2	0	4	9	20	−11	90	144	−54	0	1	9
(France) Clermont Auvergne	6	1	0	5	14	21	−7	136	200	−64	1	1	6

22 October 2005
14:45

Leicester Tigers (England)	57–23	(France) Clermont Auvergne

Welford Road
Attendance: 16,815

23 October 2005
15:00

Ospreys (Wales)	13–8	(France) Stade Français

Liberty Stadium
Attendance: 9,408

29 October 2005
14:00

Stade Français (France)	12–6	(England) Leicester Tigers

Stade Charléty
Attendance: 19,700

30 October 2005
16:00

Clermont Auvergne (France)	34–14	(Wales) Ospreys

Stade Marcel-Michelin
Attendance: 11,000

10 December 2005
16:00

Clermont Auvergne (France)	12–16	(France) Stade Français

Stade Marcel-Michelin
Attendance: 11,000

11 December 2005
15:00

Leicester Tigers (England)	30–12	(Wales) Ospreys

Welford Road
Attendance: 16,815

17 December 2005
18:00

Stade Français (France)	47–28	(France) Clermont

Stade Jean-Bouin
Attendance: 12,000

18 December 2005
13:00

Ospreys (Wales)	15–17	(England) Leicester Tigers

Liberty Stadium
Attendance: 11,488

14 January 2006
17:00

Ospreys (Wales)	26–12	(France) Clermont

Liberty Stadium
Attendance: 7,204

15 January 2006
15:00

Leicester Tigers (England)	29–22	(France) Stade Français

Welford Road
Attendance: 16,815

20 January 2006
20:30

Clermont (France)	27–40	(England) Leicester Tigers

Stade Marcel-Michelin
Attendance: 10,000

20 January 2006
20:30

Stade Français (France)	43–10	(Wales) Ospreys

Stade Jean-Bouin
Attendance: 12,000

== Pool 4 ==
Team	P	W	D	L	Tries for	Tries against	Try diff	Points for	Points against	Points diff	TB	LB	Pts
(France) Biarritz (2)	6	5	0	1	24	10	+14	182	93	+89	4	0	24
(England) Saracens	6	4	0	2	12	13	−1	128	129	−1	1	0	17
(Ireland) Ulster	6	3	0	3	15	13	+2	126	111	+15	2	0	14
(Italy) Benetton Treviso	6	0	0	6	13	28	−15	104	207	−103	2	1	3

21 October 2005
19:30

Ulster (Ireland)	27–0	(Italy) Benetton Treviso
Try: Wilson 20'; N. Best 57'; McMillan 75'; Maggs; Con: David Humphreys (2) 20', 75'; Pen: David Humphreys 6'	Report

Ravenhill
Attendance: 12,252
Referee: Jean-Pierre Matheu

23 October 2005
15:00

Saracens (England)	22–10	(France) Biarritz

Vicarage Road
Attendance: 11,167

29 October 2005
14:00

Benetton Treviso (Italy)	17–30	(England) Saracens

Stadio Comunale di Monigo
Attendance: 3,000

29 October 2005
16:00

Biarritz (France)	33–19	(Ireland) Ulster
Try: Badabé (2) 1', 14'; Bălan 4'; Gobelet 73'; Con: Yachvili (2) 15', 73'; Pen: Yachvili (2) 40', 65'; Drop: Peyrelongue 80+5'	Report	Try: N. Best 18'; S. Best 59'; Pen: David Humphreys (3) 7', 32', 68'

Parc des Sports Aquil
Attendance: 6,000
Referee: Nigel Whitehouse

9 December 2005
19:30

Ulster (Ireland)	19–10	(England) Saracens
Try: R. Best 78'; Con: David Humphreys 79'; Pen: David Humphreys (4) 25', 55', 71', 77'	Report	Try: Jackson 14'; Con: Jackson 15'; Pen: Jackson 61'

Ravenhill
Attendance: 12,300
Referee: Eric Darriere

11 December 2005
16:05

Biarritz (France)	34–7	(Italy) Benetton Treviso

Parc des Sports Aquil
Attendance: 4,500

17 December 2005
13:00

Saracens (England)	18–10	(Ireland) Ulster
Try: Skirving 3'; Yates 40+4'; Con: Jackson 4'; Pen: Jackson (2) 67', 80+5'	Report	Try: Bowe 5'; Con: David Humphreys 6'; Pen: David Humphreys 78'

Vicarage Road
Attendance: 8,571
Referee: Joel Jutge

17 December 2005
14:00

Benetton Treviso (Italy)	24–38	(France) Biarritz

Stadio Comunale di Monigo
Attendance: 2,500

13 January 2006
19:30

Ulster (Ireland)	8–24	(France) Biarritz
Try: Best 5'; Pen: David Humphreys 51'	Report	Try: Bobo 30'; Bălan 62'; Con: Yachvili 62'; Pen: Yachvili (3) 11', 72' 79'; Drop: Peyrelongue 80+1'

Ravenhill
Attendance: 12,300
Referee: Dave Pearson

15 January 2006
15:00

Saracens (England)	35–30	(Italy) Benetton Treviso

Vicarage Road
Attendance: 5,712

21 January 2006
16:00

Benetton Treviso (Italy)	26–43	(Ireland) Ulster
Try: Tejeda (2) 39', 40+3'; Williams 42'; Palmer 67'; Con: Goosen (3) 39', 40+3', 67'	Report	Try: Maxwell (3) 3', 21', 33'; Trimble (2) 52', 79'; Wallace 60'; Con: Steinmetz (5) 4', 22', 34', 52' 79'; Pen: Steinmetz 41'

Stadio Comunale di Monigo
Attendance: 3,500
Referee: Wayne Barnes

21 January 2006
16:00

Biarritz (France)	43–13	(England) Saracens

Parc des Sports Aquil
Attendance: 7,000

== Pool 5 ==
Team	P	W	D	L	Tries for	Tries against	Try diff	Points for	Points against	Points diff	TB	LB	Pts
(England) Bath (6)	6	5	0	1	18	9	+9	166	111	+55	3	0	23
(Ireland) Leinster (8)	6	4	0	2	28	13	+15	214	124	+90	4	2	22
(France) Bourgoin	6	2	0	4	9	24	−15	109	195	−86	1	0	9
(Scotland) Glasgow	6	1	0	5	16	25	−9	131	190	−59	1	1	6

21 October 2005
20:30

Bourgoin (France)	16–3	(Scotland) Glasgow

Stade Pierre Rajon
Attendance: 7,000

22 October 2005
17:15

Leinster (Ireland)	19–22	(England) Bath

RDS Arena
Attendance: 13,152

29 October 2005
14:15

Bath (England)	39–12	(France) Bourgoin

Recreation Ground
Attendance: 10,350

30 October 2005
15:00

Glasgow (Scotland)	20–33	(Ireland) Leinster

Hughenden
Attendance: 1,907

10 December 2005
14:15

Bath (England)	31–26	(Scotland) Glasgow

Recreation Ground
Attendance: 10,200

10 December 2005
17:15

Leinster (Ireland)	53–7	(France) Bourgoin

RDS Arena
Attendance: 11,133

16 December 2005
19:30

Glasgow (Scotland)	10–29	(England) Bath

Firhill Stadium
Attendance: 1,759

17 December 2005
16:00

Bourgoin (France)	30–28	(Ireland) Leinster

Stade Pierre Rajon
Attendance: 6,800

13 January 2006
20:30

Bourgoin (France)	9–22	(England) Bath

Stade Pierre Rajon
Attendance: 7,500

14 January 2006
17:15

Leinster (Ireland)	46–22	(Scotland) Glasgow

RDS Arena
Attendance: 12,443

22 January 2006
15:00

Bath (England)	23–35	(Ireland) Leinster

Recreation Ground
Attendance: 10,600

22 January 2006
15:00

Glasgow (Scotland)	50–35	(France) Bourgoin

Firhill Stadium
Attendance: 1,038

== Pool 6 ==
Team	P	W	D	L	Tries for	Tries against	Try diff	Points for	Points against	Points diff	TB	LB	Pts
(France) Toulouse (1)	6	5	1	0	22	11	+11	188	124	+64	3	0	25
(England) London Wasps	6	2	1	3	18	13	+5	173	118	+55	2	2	14
(Wales) Llanelli Scarlets	6	2	0	4	18	26	−8	152	206	−54	2	2	12
(Scotland) Edinburgh	6	2	0	4	14	22	−8	121	186	−65	1	2	11

22 October 2005
16:00

Toulouse (France)	50–28	(Wales) Llanelli Scarlets

Stade Ernest Wallon
Attendance: 17,138

23 October 2005
13:00

Edinburgh (Scotland)	32–31	(England) London Wasps

Murrayfield Stadium
Attendance: 4,639

29 October 2005
15:00

Llanelli Scarlets (Wales)	15–13	(Scotland) Edinburgh

Stradey Park
Attendance: 6,375

30 October 2005
15:00

London Wasps (England)	15–15	(France) Toulouse

Adams Park
Attendance: 10,200

10 December 2005
16:00

Edinburgh (Scotland)	13–20	(France) Toulouse

Murrayfield Stadium
Attendance: 4,094

11 December 2005
13:00

Llanelli Scarlets (Wales)	21–13	(England) London Wasps

Stradey Park
Attendance: 7,248

16 December 2005
20:30

Toulouse (France)	35–13	(Scotland) Edinburgh

Stade Ernest Wallon
Attendance: 17,045

18 December 2005
15:00

London Wasps (England)	48–14	(Wales) Llanelli Scarlets

Adams Park
Attendance: 7,157

14 January 2006
16:00

Toulouse (France)	19–13	(England) London Wasps

Stade Municipal
Attendance: 34,000

14 January 2006
17:00

Edinburgh (Scotland)	33–32	(Wales) Llanelli Scarlets

Murrayfield Stadium
Attendance: 2,680

21 January 2006
13:00

Llanelli Scarlets (Wales)	42–49	(France) Toulouse

Stradey Park
Attendance: 7,196

21 January 2006
13:00

London Wasps (England)	53–17	(Scotland) Edinburgh

Adams Park
Attendance: 7,303

== Seeding and runners-up ==
Seed	Pool winners	Pts	TF	+/−
1	(France) Toulouse	25	22	+64
2	(France) Biarritz	24	24	+89
3	(England) Leicester Tigers	24	19	+68
4	(Ireland) Munster	23	22	+99
5	(France) Perpignan	23	20	+108
6	(England) Bath	23	18	+55
Seed	Pool runners-up	Pts	TF	+/−
7	(England) Sale Sharks	23	17	+75
8	(Ireland) Leinster	22	28	+90
–	(England) Leeds Tykes	20	19	+108
–	(France) Stade Français	20	16	+50
–	(England) Saracens	17	12	−1
–	(England) London Wasps	14	18	+55

== See also ==
- 2005–06 Heineken Cup
