= 2004–05 Powergen Cup =

Rugby union competition in England

Tournament details
- Countries: England
- Tournament format(s): knockout
- Date: September 2004 - 16 April 2005

Tournament statistics
- Teams: 132
- Matches played: 131

Final
- Venue: Twickenham Stadium, London
- Attendance: 60,300
- Champions: Leeds Tykes (1st title)
- Runners-up: Bath

The 2004–05 Powergen Cup was the 34th annual rugby union cup competition in England. Leeds Tykes won the competition for the first time in their history. The event was sponsored by Powergen and the final was held at Twickenham Stadium.

This was the last season in which the competition was confined to English teams only; from the 2005-06 season, the Welsh regional teams joined to form the Anglo-Welsh Cup. This season also marked the last time that teams outside of the English Premiership were permitted to enter.

== Earlier Rounds ==
Earlier rounds of the competition were run on a seeded system. Earlier rounds included Clubs which were lower in the RFU league structure, clubs higher in the leagues joined at later rounds.

The Qualifier Round consisted of 64 Clubs nominated by the Constituent Bodies (CB). Each CB nominated 2 Clubs, or 3 for the larger CBs such as Middlesex and Lancashire. These teams were usually selected through the previous season's County Cup (CB Cup) competitions. All were Level 5 or below. This Round produced 32 teams for the next round.

The Preliminary Round consisted of the 32 winning teams from the Qualifier Round and produced 16 teams for the 1st Round proper.

In the 1st Round, the 16 teams that won their Preliminary Round matches were joined by 14 National League 3 North and 14 National League 3 South clubs. National 3 was Level 4 of the RFU league structure; these leagues have since been renamed as National League 2 North and South. A total of 44 teams meant that this round consisted of 22 matches.

For the 2nd Round, the 22 teams that won their 1st Round matches were joined by 14 National League 2 clubs. National 2 was Level 3 of the RFU league structure; this league have since been renamed as National League 1. A total of 36 teams meant that this round consisted of 18 matches.

In the 3rd Round, the 18 teams that won their 2nd Round matches were joined by 14 National League 1 clubs. National 1 was Level 2 of the RFU league structure; this league have since been renamed as the RFU Championship. A total of 32 teams meant that this round consisted of 16 matches.

The 4th and 5th Rounds reduced the 16 teams that won their 3rd Round matches to 4 teams to advance to the 6th Round.

The 6th Round consisted of the 4 teams that won their 5th Round matches, joined by 12 Premiership clubs. The Premiership is, and remains, Level 1 of the RFU league structure, the highest level. A total of 16 teams meant that this round consisted of 8 matches.

Subsequent rounds were a standard knockout format of Quarter-finals, Semi-finals and a Final to produce an outright Cup winner.

=== Tablular form ===
Round	Qualified from previous round	Joined by	Total teams	Matches / Qualify for next round	Notes
Qualifier	n/a	64 CB nominated clubs	64	32	2 or 3 per CB, clubs from Level 5 and below
Preliminary	32	n/a	32	16	
1st Round	16	14 National League 3 North and 14 National League 3 South clubs	44	22	Level 4 clubs join
2nd Round	22	14 National League 2 clubs	36	18	Level 3 Clubs join
3rd Round	18	14 National League 1 clubs	32	16	Level 2 clubs join
4th Round	16	n/a	16	8	
5th Round	8	n/a	8	4	
6th Round	4	12 Premiership clubs	16	8	Level 1 clubs join
Quarter-finals	8	n/a	8	4	
Semi-finals	4	n/a	4	2	
Final	2	n/a	2	1	

=== First round ===
Team One	Team Two	Score
Blackburn	Blaydon	0-39
Bradford & Bingley	Bedford Athletic	54-7
Chester	Macclesfield	28-23
Cleckheaton	Darlington Mowden Park	13-21
Dudley Kingswinford	West Park St Helens	13-21
Halifax	New Brighton	34-20
Hull	Tynedale	26-20
Kendal	Longton	34-12
Reading	Scunthorpe	33-29
Rugby	Darlington	62-3
Whitchurch	Fylde	9-15
Cambridge	North Walsham	6-22
Ealing	Weston-super-Mare	20-25
Haywards Heath	Penryn	37-29
Hertford	Bridgwater & Albion	35-0
London Scottish	Worthing	9-10
Maidenhead	Barking	12-24
Old Patesians	Havant	31-30
Redruth	Berry Hill	?
Southend	Richmond	20-22
Tabard	Dings Crusaders	21-19
Westcombe Park	Lydney	40-35

=== Second round ===
Team One	Team Two	Score
Blaydon	Wharfedale	16-14
Cleckheaton	Hull	16-15
Halifax	Fylde	31-15
Harrogate	Bradford & Bingley	28-29
Kendal	Reading	36-31
Manchester	Chester	40-13
Nuneaton	Doncaster	13-16
Waterloo	Rugby	47-24
West Park St Helens	Moseley	20-35
Blackheath	Newbury	27-34
Esher	Weston-super-Mare	21-17
Haywards Heath	Tabard	16-28
Old Patesians	Launceston	12-19
Redruth	Worthing	30-23
Richmond	Hertford	31-7
Rosslyn Park	Bracknell	13-40
Stourbridge	North Walsham	11-21
Westcombe Park	Barking	33-10

=== Third round ===
Team One	Team Two	Score
Bedford	Tabard	52-13
Bracknell	Otley	27-31
Doncaster	Pertemps Bees	21-30
Launceston	Halifax	5-9
London Welsh	Exeter	19-67
Manchester	Sedgley Park	44-20
Moseley	Henley Hawks	24-20
Newbury	Nottingham	23-38
Orrell	Blaydon	38-0
Penzance/Newlyn	Esher	64-0
Redruth	Waterloo	8-20
Richmond	Kendal	13-18
Rotherham	Plymouth Albion	16-17
Stourbridge	Coventry	11-29
Westcombe Park	Cleckheaton	24-19
Bristol	Bradford & Bingley	32-6

=== Fourth round ===
Team One	Team Two	Score
Bedford	Halifax	40-10
Coventry	Penzance/Newlyn	31-23
Exeter	Manchester	78-0
Kendal	Waterloo	16-22
Otley	Westcombe Park	45-16
Pertemps Bees	Orrell	30-7
Plymouth Albion	Moseley	76-6
Bristol	Nottingham	61-14

=== Fifth round ===
Team One	Team Two	Score
Bedford	Exeter	23-18
Coventry	Pertemps Bees	23-28
Plymouth Albion	Otley	23-15
Waterloo	Bristol	3-57

== Later Rounds ==
The 12 Premiership teams joined the 4 qualifiers from Round 5 to make up the draw for Round 6.

Round 6
18 December 2004
Northampton Saints	41
Bedford Blues	8
19 December 2004
Leeds Tykes	81
Pertemps Bees	17
19 December 2004
Saracens	22
Newcastle Falcons	20
18 December 2004
Worcester	7
London Irish	9
18 December 2004
Leicester Tigers	13
Gloucester	20
19 December 2004
Bristol Shoguns	33
London Wasps^{1}	43
19 December 2004
Sale Sharks	38
Plymouth Albion	18
18 December 2004
Bath	33
Harlequins	7

Quarter-finals
22 January 2005
Northampton Saints	19
Leeds Tykes	24
23 January 2005
Saracens	15
London Irish	21
22 January 2005
Gloucester	21
Bristol Shoguns	0
21 January 2005
Sale Sharks	23
Bath	24

Semi-finals
6 March 2005
Leeds Tykes	15
London Irish	6
6 March 2005
Gloucester	19
Bath	24

Final
16 April 2005
Leeds Tykes	20
Bath	12

^{1} London Wasps disqualified for fielding an ineligible player

== Final ==
16 April 2005
14:30

Leeds Tykes	20–12	Bath
Try: Bell; Snyman; Con: Ross (2); Pen: Ross (2)	Score	Pen: Malone (4)

Twickenham Stadium, London
Attendance: 60,300
Referee: Dave Pearson

Leeds
Bath

FB	15	(England) Iain Balshaw (c)
RW	14	(South Africa) André Snyman
OC	13	(England) Phil Christophers
IC	12	(England) Chris Bell
LW	11	(England) Tom Biggs
FH	10	(Scotland) Gordon Ross
SH	9	(England) Alan Dickens
N8	8	(Wales) Alix Popham
OF	7	(Wales) Richard Parks
BF	6	(Wales) Scott Morgan
RL	5	(England) Tom Palmer
LL	4	(England) Stuart Hooper
TP	3	(Scotland) Gavin Kerr
HK	2	(England) Mark Regan
LP	1	(England) Mike Shelley
Replacements:
HK	16	(Australia) Matt Holt
HK	17	(England) Rob Rawlinson
FL	18	(Scotland) Jon Dunbar
FL	19	(England) Dan Hyde
SH	20	(Scotland) Mark McMillan
CE	21	(Australia) Craig McMullen
WG	22	(Argentina) Diego Albanese
Coach:
(England) Jon Callard

FB	15	(England) Matt Perry
RW	14	(New Zealand) Joe Maddock
OC	13	(England) Andrew Higgins
IC	12	(England) Olly Barkley
LW	11	(South Africa) Frikkie Welsh
FH	10	(Australia) Chris Malone
SH	9	(England) Nick Walshe
N8	8	(Samoa) Isaac Fe'aunati
OF	7	(England) James Scaysbrook
BF	6	(Wales) Geraint Lewis
RL	5	(England) Danny Grewcock (c)
LL	4	(England) Rob Fidler
TP	3	(England) Duncan Bell
HK	2	(England) Lee Mears
LR	1	(England) Matt Stevens
Replacements:
HK	16	(Wales) Jonathan Humphreys
PR	17	(England) David Flatman
N8	18	(Wales) Gareth Delve
WG	19	(New Zealand) Brendon Daniel
SH	20	(England) Martyn Wood
FH	21	(England) Ryan Davis
Coach:
(Australia) John Connolly

== See also ==
- 2004–05 English Premiership (rugby union)
