= 2010–11 Heineken Cup pool stage =

- Season: 2010–11 Heineken Cup
- Date: 8 October 2010 - 23 January 2011

Qualifiers
- Seed 1: (England) Northampton Saints
- Seed 2: (Ireland) Leinster
- Seed 3: (France) Perpignan
- Seed 4: (France) Biarritz
- Seed 5: (France) Toulouse
- Seed 6: (France) Toulon
- Seed 7: (England) Leicester Tigers
- Seed 8: (Ireland) Ulster

The 2010–11 Heineken Cup pool stage was the first stage of the current season of the Heineken Cup, Europe's top competition for rugby union clubs. It involved 24 teams competing for eight quarter-final berths; the quarter-finalists will then participate in a knockout tournament that will ultimately end with the final on 21 May 2011 at Millennium Stadium in Cardiff.

The draw for the pool stage took place on 8 June 2010 in Cardiff. The competing teams were arranged into six pools consisting of four teams each, with the six pool winners and two best runners-up qualifying for the knockout stages. The third- through fifth-best runners-up parachuted into the knockout stage of the Amlin Challenge Cup.

The pool stage began with three matches on 8 October 2010 and ended with four matches on 23 January 2011.

== Seeding ==
The seeding system was the same as in the 2009–10 tournament. The 24 competing teams are ranked based on past Heineken Cup and European Challenge Cup performance, with each pool receiving one team from each quartile, or Tier. The requirement to have only one team per country in each pool, however, still applies (with the exception of the inclusion of the seventh French team).

The brackets show each team's European Rugby Club Ranking at the end of the 2009–10 season. Aironi inherited the ranking of Viadana, the principal shareholders in the new Magners League team.

Tier 1	(Ireland) Munster (1)	(France) Toulouse (2)	(Ireland) Leinster (3)	(England) Leicester Tigers (4)	(Wales) Cardiff Blues (5)	(France) Biarritz (6)
Tier 2	(England) London Wasps (7)	(France) Clermont (9)	(Wales) Ospreys (10)	(England) Northampton Saints (11)	(England) Bath (12)	(Wales) Scarlets (14)
Tier 3	(France) Perpignan (15)	(England) London Irish (16)	(England) Saracens (17)	(Ireland) Ulster (19)	(Scotland) Glasgow Warriors (21)	(Scotland) Edinburgh (22)
Tier 4	(Wales) Newport Gwent Dragons (24)	(Italy) Benetton Treviso (28)	(France) Castres (29)	(France) Toulon (30)	(Italy) Aironi (34)	(France) Racing Métro (40)

== Tiebreakers ==
The competition organiser, European Rugby Cup, has elaborate tiebreaking rules for both the Heineken Cup and Amlin Challenge Cup, with a total of seven possible steps.

The first three apply only if tied teams are in the same pool:

- Competition points earned in head-to-head matches
- Total tries scored in head-to-head matches
- Point differential in head-to-head matches

The remaining steps are used if tied teams are in different pools, or if the above steps cannot break a tie between teams in the same pool:

- Tries scored in all pool matches
- Point differential in all pool matches
- Best disciplinary record (fewest players receiving red or yellow cards in all pool matches)
- Coin toss

== Results ==
Key to colours
Winner of each pool, advance to quarterfinals. Seed # in parentheses
Two highest-scoring second-place teams, advance to quarterfinals. Seed # in parentheses.
Third- through fifth-highest-scoring second-place teams parachute into the knockout stage of the Amlin Challenge Cup. Seed # in brackets [ ].

All kickoff times are local to the match location.

=== Pool 1 ===
Team	P	W	D	L	Tries for	Tries against	Try diff	Points for	Points against	Points diff	TB	LB	Pts
(England) Northampton Saints (1)	6	6	0	0	16	7	+9	155	87	+68	1	0	25
(Wales) Cardiff Blues	6	3	0	3	6	8	−2	107	113	−6	0	2	14
(France) Castres	6	2	0	4	10	12	−2	105	115	−10	0	3	11
(Scotland) Edinburgh	6	1	0	5	10	10	0	98	150	−52	0	4	8

8 October 2010
20:00

Northampton Saints (England)	18 – 14	(France) Castres Olympique
Try: Reihana 31' m Foden 41' c Con: Reihana (0/1); Geraghty (1/1); Pen: Reihana (0/3); Geraghty (1/2) 62'; Myler (1/1) 78'	Report	Try: Tekori 21' m Con: Bernard (0/1); Pen: Bernard (2/5) 60', 70'; Drop: McIntyre (1/1) 34'

Franklin's Gardens, Northampton
Attendance: 12,835
Referee: John Lacey (Ireland)

9 October 2010
17:45

Cardiff Blues (Wales)	18 – 17	(Scotland) Edinburgh
Try: Czekaj 34' c Laulala 69' m Con: Parks (1/2); Pen: Parks (2/6) 26', 36'	Report	Try: Jacobsen 22' c Cairns 72' c Con: Paterson (2/2); Pen: Paterson (1/1) 2'

Cardiff City Stadium, Cardiff
Attendance: 10,521
Referee: Romain Poite (France)

15 October 2010
21:00

Castres Olympique (France)	27 – 20	(Wales) Cardiff Blues
Try: Inigo 36' c Andreu 39' m Con: Teulet (1/2); Pen: Teulet (4/5) 12', 17', 26', 33'; Drop: Bai 21'	Report	Try: Molitika 43' c Andrews 79' c Con: Sweeney (2/2); Pen: Blair (2/2) 28', 35'

Stade Pierre-Antoine, Castres
Attendance: 8,000
Referee: Alan Lewis (Ireland)

16 October 2010
13:00

Edinburgh (Scotland)	27 – 31	(England) Northampton Saints
Try: Jacobsen 10' c Talei 26' c Cairns 31' c Con: Paterson (3/3); Pen: Paterson (2/2) 3', 49'	Report	Try: Hartley 8' c Downey 40' m Diggin 53' c Con: Myler (2/3); Pen: Myler (4/4) 22', 29', 37', 61'

Murrayfield, Edinburgh
Attendance: 4,905
Referee: Jérôme Garces (France)

11 December 2010
18:45

Castres Olympique (France)	21 – 16	(Scotland) Edinburgh
Try: Inigo 59' m Malonga 63' c Con: Bernard (1/2); Pen: Teulet (3/4) 3', 7', 18'	Report	Try: Webster 71' c Con: Paterson (1/1); Pen: Paterson (2/3) 17', 36'; Laidlaw (1/1) 39'

Stade Pierre Antoine
Attendance: 7,570
Referee: JP Doyle (England)

11 December 2010
17:45

Northampton Saints (England)	23 – 15	(Wales) Cardiff Blues
Try: Diggin 20' c Ashton 42' c Con: Myler (2/2); Pen: Myler (3/3) 39', 54', 66'	Report	Pen: Parks (5/6) 3', 31', 34', 38', 70'

Franklin's Gardens
Attendance: 13,499
Referee: Romain Poite (France)

20 December 2010
14:00

Edinburgh (Scotland)	24 - 22	(France) Castres Olympique
Try: Visser 7' c Jones 21' c Webster 76' c Con: Paterson (2/2); D. Blair (1/1); Pen: D. Blair 46'	Report	Try: Capo 12' c Penalty try 66' c Tillous-Borde 71' m Con: Bai (2/3); Pen: Bernard 2'

Murrayfield
Attendance: 0
Referee: Wayne Barnes (England)

- This match was postponed from the original date of 19 December due to heavy snow in Edinburgh. The rescheduled match was held behind closed doors due to snow-related access issues in the stadium area.

19 December 2010
15:00

Cardiff Blues (Wales)	19 – 23	(England) Northampton Saints
Try: Mustoe 43' c Con: Parks (1/1); Pen: Parks (3) 14', 30', 36'	Report	Try: Clark 73' m Pen: Myler (6) 2', 19', 40', 49', 54', 60'

Cardiff City Stadium
Attendance: 7,124
Referee: Jérôme Garces (France)

14 January 2011
19:30

Cardiff Blues (Wales)	14 - 9	(France) Castres Olympique
Try: Halfpenny 27' m Pen: Parks 12', 16', 43'	Report	Pen: Bai 6', 51'; Bernard 79'

Cardiff City Stadium
Attendance: 7,024
Referee: Andrew Small (England)

14 January 2011
20:00

Northampton Saints (England)	37 - 0	(Scotland) Edinburgh
Try: Mujati 4' c Diggin (4) 30' m, 72' m, 77' c, 79' c Con: Myler (2/4); Ford (1/1); Pen: Myler (2) 16', 41'	Report

Franklin's Gardens
Attendance: 13,165
Referee: Christophe Berdos (France)

22 January 2011
18:45

Castres Olympique (France)	12 – 23	(England) Northampton Saints
Try: Bernard 30' c Tillous-Borde 76' m Con: Bernard (1/2)	Report	Try: Ansbro 11' m Dowson 27' c Foden 56' m Con: Myler (1/3); Pen: Myler (1/1) 69'; Drop: Myler 25'

Stade Pierre Antoine
Attendance: 5,025
Referee: Peter Fitzgibbon (Ireland)

22 January 2011
17:45

Edinburgh (Scotland)	14 – 21	(Wales) Cardiff Blues
Try: Cairns 28' m Pen: Paterson (3/4) 12', 40', 45'	Report	Pen: Parks (2/4) 3', 43'; Halfpenny (5/5) 18', 60', 64', 66', 75'

Murrayfield
Attendance: 2,379
Referee: Pascal Gauzere (France)

=== Pool 2 ===
Team	P	W	D	L	Tries for	Tries against	Try diff	Points for	Points against	Points diff	TB	LB	Pts
(Ireland) Leinster (2)	6	5	0	1	21	9	+12	179	104	+75	3	1	24
(France) Clermont [6]	6	4	0	2	14	9	+5	114	94	+20	2	1	19
(France) Racing Métro	6	2	0	4	9	17	−8	104	151	−47	0	1	9
(England) Saracens	6	1	0	5	9	18	−9	107	155	−48	0	2	6

9 October 2010
13:30

Leinster (Ireland)	38 – 22	(France) Racing Métro 92
Try: O'Brien 30' c Kearney 33' m Strauss 48' m Heaslip 62' c McFadden 79' m Con: Nacewa (2/5); Pen: Nacewa (3/4) 4', 28', 38'	Report	Try: Vulivuli 55' c Con: Fillol (1/1); Pen: Fillol (3/3) 12', 41', 66'; Steyn (2/3) 36', 51'

RDS Arena, Dublin
Attendance: 17,936
Referee: Dave Pearson (England)

9 October 2010
16:30

ASM Clermont Auvergne (France)	25 – 10	(England) Saracens
Try: Cudmore 10' c Malzieu 24' m Nalaga 79' c Con: Parra (2/3); Pen: Floch (0/1); James (0/1); Parra (2/3) 48', 65'	Report	Try: Strettle 43' c Con: Hougaard (1/1); Pen: Hougaard (1/4) 21'

Stade Marcel-Michelin, Clermont-Ferrand
Attendance: 16,007
Referee: Peter Allan (Scotland)

16 October 2010
14:30

Racing Métro 92 (France)	16 – 9	(France) ASM Clermont Auvergne
Try: Bobo 39' c Con: Wisniewski (1/1); Pen: Wisniewski (3/4) 9', 33', 58'	Report	Pen: Williams (3/3) 22', 35', 71'

Stade Olympique Yves-du-Manoir, Colombes
Attendance: 10,512
Referee: Nigel Owens (Wales)

16 October 2010
17:45

Saracens (England)	23 – 25	(Ireland) Leinster
Try: Goode 12' m Pen: Hougaard (2/3) 15', 33'; Goode (4/4) 55', 62', 68', 74'	Report	Try: Sexton 52' c Con: Sexton (1/1); Pen: Sexton (6/6) 6', 19', 26', 35', 44', 63'

Wembley Stadium, London
Attendance: 45,892
Referee: Christophe Berdos (France)

11 December 2010
15:30

Saracens (England)	21 - 24	(France) Racing Métro 92
Try: Cato 5' m Barritt 76' c Con: Farrell (1/2); Pen: Farrell (3/4) 12', 57', 64'	Report	Try: Hernández 24' c Bobo 66' m Con: Wisniewski (1/2); Pen: Wisniewski (1/1) 14'; Steyn (2/2) 18', 54'; Drop: Wisniewski (1/2) 65'

Vicarage Road, Watford
Attendance: 6,064
Referee: Alain Rolland (Ireland)

12 December 2010
16:00

ASM Clermont Auvergne (France)	20 - 13	(Ireland) Leinster
Try: Malzieu 6' c Floch 53' c Con: Parra (2/2); Pen: Parra (2/3) 24', 60'	Report	Try: Horgan 3' c Con: Sexton (1/1); Pen: Sexton (2/2) 11', 57'

Stade Marcel-Michelin
Attendance: 16,106
Referee: Wayne Barnes (England)

17 December 2010
21:00

Racing Métro 92 (France)	14 – 19	(England) Saracens
Try: Bergamasco 47' c Durand 52' c Con: Wisniewski (2/2)	Report	Try: Barritt 34' c Con: Farrell (1/1); Pen: Farrell (3/4) 3', 38', 80'; Drop: Farrell (1/1) 8'

Stade Olympique Yves-du-Manoir
Attendance: 8,405
Referee: George Clancy (Ireland)

18 December 2010
17:45

Leinster (Ireland)	24 - 8	(France) ASM Clermont Auvergne
Try: Healy (2) 7' c, 43' c O'Brien 50' c Con: Sexton (3/3); Pen: Sexton (1/1)	Report	Try: Nalaga 68' m Pen: Parra (1/3)

Aviva Stadium, Dublin
Attendance: 44,873
Referee: Nigel Owens (Wales)

14 January 2011
21:00

ASM Clermont Auvergne (France)	28 – 17	(France) Racing Métro 92
Try: Canale 25' c Domingo 55' c White 61' c Rougerie 72' c Con: James (3/3); Parra (1/1)	Report	Try: le Roux 15' c Jané 64' c Con: Hernández (2/2); Pen: Hernández (1/2) 6'

Stade Marcel-Michelin
Attendance: 15,263
Referee: Wayne Barnes (England)

15 January 2011
13:30

Leinster (Ireland)	43 - 20	(England) Saracens
Try: O'Brien 6' m D. Ryan (2) 11' c, 37' c McFadden 50' c Nacewa 60' c O'Malley 63' c Con: Sexton (5/6); Pen: Sexton (1/1) 28'	Report	Try: Short 24' c Brown 32' m Mordt 80' m Con: Farrell (1/3); Pen: Farrell (1/1) 56'

RDS Arena
Attendance: 18,500
Referee: Romain Poite (France)

21 January 2011
21:00

Racing Métro 92 (France)	11 – 36	(Ireland) Leinster
Try: Vakatawa 15' m Pen: Hernández (2/3) 2', 36'	Report	Try: Nacewa 11' c O'Brien 19' c Sexton (2) 23' c, 62' m O'Driscoll 68' c Con: Sexton (4/5); Pen: Sexton (1/1) 54'

Stade Olympique Yves-du-Manoir
Attendance: 8,326
Referee: Greg Garner (England)

21 January 2011
20:00

Saracens (England)	14 – 24	(France) ASM Clermont Auvergne
Try: Strettle 31' m Pen: Farrell (3/3) 21', 26', 53'	Report	Try: Fofana 2' c Wepener 34' m Lavea 62' c Paulo 77' m Con: Floch (1/2); Lavea (1/2)

Vicarage Road
Attendance: 5,812
Referee: Alan Lewis (Ireland)

=== Pool 3 ===
Team	P	W	D	L	Tries for	Tries against	Try diff	Points for	Points against	Points diff	TB	LB	Pts
(France) Toulon (6)	6	4	0	2	13	13	0	143	134	+9	1	0	17
(Ireland) Munster [7]	6	3	0	3	17	9	+8	143	122	+21	2	2	16
(Wales) Ospreys	6	3	0	3	7	11	−4	117	113	+4	0	2	14
(England) London Irish	6	2	0	4	9	13	−4	107	141	−34	0	1	9

9 October 2010
14:30

Toulon (France)	19 – 14	(Wales) Ospreys
Try: Sackey 76' c Con: Wilkinson (1/1); Pen: Wilkinson (4/6) 14', 31', 42', 74'	Report	Try: Williams 60' m Con: Biggar (0/1); Pen: Biggar (3/5) 2', 40'+1', 53'

Stade Félix-Mayol, Toulon
Attendance: 13,000
Referee: Alan Lewis (Ireland)

9 October 2010
17:45

London Irish (England)	23 – 17	(Ireland) Munster
Try: Ojo 41' m Con: Lamb (0/1); Pen: Lamb (4/4) 8', 11', 20', 37'; D. Armitage (1/2) 73'; Drop: Lamb 33'	Report	Try: Tuitupou 80' m Con: O'Gara (0/1); Pen: O'Gara (4/5) 5', 39', 55', 69'

Madejski Stadium, Reading
Attendance: 20,188
Referee: Christophe Berdos (France)

15 October 2010
20:00

Ospreys (Wales)	27 – 16	(England) London Irish
Try: Bowe 4' m Williams 53' c Con: Biggar (0/1); Hook (1/1); Pen: Biggar (4/4) 15', 32', 35', 40'; Hook (1/1) 58'	Report	Try: Tagicakibau 42' c Con: Lamb (1/1); Pen: Lamb (3/5) 8', 13', 61'

Liberty Stadium, Swansea
Attendance: 12,437
Referee: Peter Fitzgibbon (Ireland)

16 October 2010
15:30

Munster (Ireland)	45 – 18	(France) Toulon
Try: Leamy 9' c Buckley 20' c Howlett (2) 36' c, 62' c O'Driscoll 59' c Coughlan 79' c Con: O'Gara (6/6); Pen: O'Gara (1/2) 47'	Report	Try: Genevois 1' c van Niekerk 75' m Con: Contepomi (1/1); Wilkinson (0/1); Pen: Contepomi (1/3) 30'; Drop: Wilkinson 49'

Thomond Park, Limerick
Attendance: 26,000
Referee: Wayne Barnes (England)

12 December 2010
13:00

Munster (Ireland)	22 - 16	(Wales) Ospreys
Try: Howlett 10' m Wallace 58' c Murphy 63' c Con: O'Gara (2/3); Pen: O'Gara (1/3) 40'	Report	Try: Bowe 42' c Con: Biggar (1/1); Pen: Biggar (3/5) 1', 12', 67'

Thomond Park
Attendance: 26,000
Referee: Christophe Berdos (France)

12 December 2010
15:00

London Irish (England)	13 - 19	(France) Toulon
Try: D. Armitage 38' c Con: Lamb (1/1); Pen: Lamb (1/3) 56'; Bowden (1/1) 79'	Report	Try: Wulf 38' c Con: Wilkinson (1/1); Pen: Wilkinson (4/4) 16', 18', 65', 75'

Madejski Stadium
Attendance: 12,240
Referee: Nigel Owens (Wales)

18 December 2010
15:30

Ospreys (Wales)	19 - 15	(Ireland) Munster
Try: Phillips 25' c Con: Biggar (1/1); Pen: Biggar (4) 17', 36', 55', 68'	Report	Try: Buckley 23' c Earls 58' m Con: O'Gara (1/2); Pen: O'Gara 5'

Liberty Stadium
Attendance: 12,189
Referee: Romain Poite (France)

18 December 2010
16:30

Toulon (France)	38 - 17	(England) London Irish
Try: Missoup 23' c Ivaldi 40' c Contepomi 68' c May 72' c Loamanu 75' c Con: Contepomi (5/5); Pen: Contepomi 6'	Report	Try: Malone 53' c Corbisiero 64' c Con: Malone (2/2); Pen: Malone 50'

Stade Félix Mayol
Attendance: 11,525
Referee: Alain Rolland (Ireland)

16 January 2011
15:00

London Irish (England)	24 - 12	(Wales) Ospreys
Try: Tagicakibau 19' m Ojo 41' c Con: Bowden (1/2); Pen: Bowden 15',28',38'; Lamb 78'	Report	Pen: Biggar 18',31',44'; Hook 65'

Madejski Stadium
Attendance: 12,116
Referee: George Clancy (Ireland)

16 January 2011
16:00

Toulon (France)	32 - 16	(Ireland) Munster
Try: Loamanu 22' c Sackey 37' c Con: Wilkinson (2/2); Pen: Wilkinson (6/8) 8', 14', 16', 34', 41', 59'	Report	Try: Wallace 76' c Con: O'Gara (1/1); Pen: O'Gara (3/3) 2', 25', 40'

Stade Félix Mayol
Attendance: 13,900
Referee: Dave Pearson (England)

22 January 2011
15:30

Munster (Ireland)	28 – 14	(England) London Irish
Try: Varley 46' c Ronan 70' c Earls 73' c Hurley 79' c Con: O'Gara (4/4)	Report	Try: Mapusua 58' c Tagicakibau 67' c Con: Bowden (1/1); Lamb (1/1)

Thomond Park
Attendance: 26,000
Referee: Peter Allan (Scotland)

22 January 2011
15:30

Ospreys (Wales)	29 – 17	(France) Toulon
Try: Walker 61' c A.W. Jones 76' c Con: Hook (2/2); Pen: Biggar (3/4) 5', 29', 38'; Hook (2/2) 56', 71'	Report	Try: Lamont 9' c Henjak 19' c Con: Wilkinson (2/2); Pen: Wilkinson (1/2) 45'

Liberty Stadium
Attendance: 10,192
Referee: Wayne Barnes (England)

=== Pool 4 ===
Team	P	W	D	L	Tries for	Tries against	Try diff	Points for	Points against	Points diff	TB	LB	Pts
(France) Biarritz (4)	6	4	0	2	16	9	+7	140	85	+55	4	2	22
(Ireland) Ulster (8)	6	5	0	1	15	8	+7	145	93	+52	2	0	22
(England) Bath	6	2	0	4	20	8	+12	147	108	+39	2	4	14
(Italy) Aironi	6	1	0	5	4	30	−26	65	211	−146	0	0	4

- Biarritz won the tiebreaker over Ulster with a 6–4 advantage in head-to-head competition points.

8 October 2010
19:30

Ulster (Ireland)	30 – 6	(Italy) Aironi
Try: Trimble 21' m Humphreys 44' m Danielli 60' c Pienaar 67' c Con: Pienaar (0/2); Humphreys (2/2); Pen: Pienaar (2/3) 2', 39'	Report	Pen: Mercier (2/3) 5', 17'

Ravenhill, Belfast
Attendance: 7,777
Referee: Chris White (England)

10 October 2010
13:00

Bath (England)	11 – 12	(France) Biarritz Olympique
Try: Claassens 6' m Con: Barkley (0/1); Pen: Barkley (2/4) 3', 63'	Report	Pen: Yachvili (4/4) 41', 50', 54', 70'

The Recreation Ground, Bath
Attendance: 11,631
Referee: James Jones (Wales)

16 October 2010
14:30

Aironi (Italy)	6 – 22	(England) Bath
Pen: Mercier (2/2) 21', 54'	Report	Try: Biggs 12' m Carraro 23' m Abendanon 36' c Watson 67' m Con: Barkley (1/4)

Stadio Luigi Zaffanella, Viadana
Attendance: 4,000
Referee: John Lacey (Ireland)

17 October 2010
16:00

Biarritz Olympique (France)	35 – 15	(Ireland) Ulster
Try: Ngwenya (2) 44' c, 76' m Carizza 60' c Marconnet 66' c Con: Yachvili (3/4); Pen: Yachvili (3/3) 36', 53', 57'	Report	Try: Trimble 67' m Ferris 80' c Con: Pienaar (1/2); Pen: Pienaar (1/2) 12'

Parc des Sports Aguiléra, Biarritz
Attendance: 10,000
Referee: Dave Pearson (England)

11 December 2010
13:30

Ulster (Ireland)	22 - 18	(England) Bath
Try: Wannenburg 34' c Con: Humphreys (1/1); Pen: Humphreys (5/6) 12', 39', 53', 60', 64'	Report	Try: Cuthbert 7' c Moody 23' m Con: Barkley (1/2); Pen: Barkley (2/2) 2', 43'

Ravenhill
Attendance: 8,247
Referee: Jérôme Garces (France)

11 December 2010
14:30

Aironi (Italy)	28 - 27	(France) Biarritz Olympique
Try: Marshall 38' m Toniolatti 48' c Pratichetti 63' c Con: Tebaldi (2/3); Pen: Tebaldi (2) 3', 31'; Drop: J. Laharrague 78'	Report	Try: Terrain 7' m Ngwenya 16' c Balshaw 42' m Gimenez 58' c Con: Yachvili (2/4); Pen: Yachvili 73'

Stadio Luigi Zaffanella
Attendance: 3,000
Referee: Peter Fitzgibbon (Ireland)

17 December 2010
19:00

Biarritz Olympique (France)	34 - 3	(Italy) Aironi
Try: Bosch 10' c Penalty try 22' c Ngwenya 46' c August 56' c Con: Yachvili (4/4); Pen: Yachvili (2/2) 2', 16'	Report	Pen: Bocchino (1/2) 60'

Parc des Sports Aguiléra
Attendance: 6,816
Referee: Andrew Small (England)

18 December 2010
13:30

Bath (England)	22 - 26	(Ireland) Ulster
Try: Carraro 1' m Banahan 69' m Pen: Barkley (4) 8', 14', 24', 67'	Report	Try: D'Arcy 11' c Spence 56' c Con: Humphreys (2/2); Pen: Humphreys (4) 16' 38', 59', 71'

The Recreation Ground
Attendance: 11,900
Referee: Pascal Gauzere (France)

15 January 2011
14:30

Bath (England)	55 – 16	(Italy) Aironi
Try: Biggs (2) 9' m, 27' c Watson (2) 20' c, 77' c Banahan (4) 29' c, 53' c, 58' c, 70' m Con: Barkley (6/8); Pen: Barkley (1/1) 2'	Report	Try: Sole 36' c Con: Marshall (1/1); Pen: Marshall (3/3) 4', 14', 49'

The Recreation Ground
Attendance: 10,000
Referee: Neil Paterson (Scotland)

15 January 2011
15:30

Ulster (Ireland)	9 – 6	(France) Biarritz Olympique
Pen: Humphreys (3/4) 48', 56', 77'	Report	Pen: Yachvili (2/2) 18', 39'

Ravenhill
Attendance: 10,566
Referee: Nigel Owens (Wales)

22 January 2011
14:30

Aironi (Italy)	6 – 43	(Ireland) Ulster
Pen: Tebaldi 37'; Drop: Marshall 26'	Report	Try: Trimble 23' c Wannenburg (2) 41' c, 46' c Penalty try 57' c Henry 67' c Danielli 78' m Con: Humphreys (5/6); Pen: Humphreys (1/2) 3'

Stadio Luigi Zaffanella
Attendance: 3,000
Referee: Christophe Berdos (France)

22 January 2011
14:30

Biarritz Olympique (France)	26 – 19	(England) Bath
Try: Yachvili 9' c Balshaw (2) 17' c, 41' c Ngwenya 63' m Con: Yachvili (3/4)	Report	Try: Hooper 46' m Biggs (2) 73' c, 80' c Con: Vesty (2/2)

Parc des Sports Aguiléra
Attendance: 9,337
Referee: George Clancy (Ireland)

=== Pool 5 ===
Team	P	W	D	L	Tries for	Tries against	Try diff	Points for	Points against	Points diff	TB	LB	Pts
(France) Perpignan (3)	6	4	1	1	23	9	+14	196	112	+84	4	0	22
(England) Leicester Tigers (7)	6	4	1	1	25	10	+15	215	118	+97	3	1	22
(Wales) Scarlets	6	3	0	3	16	24	−8	149	191	−42	3	0	15
(Italy) Benetton Treviso	6	0	0	6	11	32	−21	109	248	−139	0	1	1

Notes

- Perpignan won the tiebreaker over Leicester Tigers with a 6–3 edge in head-to-head competition points.

9 October 2010
14:30

Benetton Treviso (Italy)	29 – 34	(England) Leicester Tigers
Try: Benvenuti (2) 10' c, 51' c Con: Burton (2/2); Pen: Burton (3/5) 26', 43', 62'; Drop: Burton 36'; Benvenuti 67'	Report	Try: Smith 2' m Newby 21' m Castrogiovanni 46' c Youngs 56' c A. Tuilagi 78' c Con: Twelvetrees (3/5); Pen: Twelvetrees (1/2) 14'

Stadio Comunale di Monigo, Treviso
Attendance: 5,800
Referee: Pascal Gauzere (France)

9 October 2010
15:30

Scarlets (Wales)	43 – 34	(France) Perpignan
Try: Priestland (2) 35' c, 39' c King 45' c S. Jones 47' c Con: S. Jones (4/4); Pen: S. Jones (5/6) 3', 13', 20', 28', 67'	Report	Try: Grandclaude 6' m Candelon 16' c Plante 55' c Tonița 69' m Chouly 78' c Con: Porical (3/5); Pen: Porical (1/2) 40'

Parc y Scarlets, Llanelli
Attendance: 8,911
Referee: Andrew Small (England)

17 October 2010
14:00

Perpignan (France)	35 – 14	(Italy) Benetton Treviso
Try: Porical 11' c Hume 55' c Penalty try 64' c Britz 69' c Chouly 74' c Con: Porical (3/3); Mélé (1/1); Boulogne (1/1)	Report	Try: Benvenuti (2) 35' c, 41' c Con: Botes (2/2)

Stade Aimé Giral, Perpignan
Attendance: 11,368
Referee: JP Doyle (England)

17 October 2010
15:00

Leicester Tigers (England)	46 – 10	(Wales) Scarlets
Try: Castrogiovanni 16' c Youngs 41' c Waldrom 48' c Croft (2) 51' c, 61' c Smith 73' m Con: Flood (5/5); Twelvetrees (0/1); Pen: Flood (2/3) 31', 34'	Report	Try: Stoddart 13' c Con: S. Jones (1/1); Pen: S. Jones (1/1) 39'

Welford Road, Leicester
Attendance: 19,160
Referee: George Clancy (Ireland)

11 December 2010
14:30

Perpignan (France)	24 - 19	(England) Leicester Tigers
Try: Plante 40' c Porical 50' m Con: Porical (1/2); Pen: Porical (4/7) 17', 38', 69', 72'	Report	Try: Murphy 53' c Con: Flood (1/1); Pen: Flood (4/5) 2', 21', 35', 73'

Stade Aimé Giral
Attendance: 13,705
Referee: Alan Lewis (Ireland)

11 December 2010
17:45

Scarlets (Wales)	35 - 27	(Italy) Benetton Treviso
Try: Lamont (2) 1' c, 59' m King 23' c Turnbull 44' c Con: S. Jones (1/1); Priestland (2/3); Pen: S. Jones 5'; Priestland (2) 25', 36'	Report	Try: Garcia 19' c Benvenuti 46' c Semenzato 53' c Con: Burton (3/3); Pen: Burton 9'; Drop: Burton 14'

Parc y Scarlets
Attendance: 6,421
Referee: Greg Garner (England)

18 December 2010
14:30

Benetton Treviso (Italy)	15 - 38	(Wales) Scarlets
Try: Barbieri 40' c Filippucci 53' m Con: de Waal (1/2); Pen: de Waal 2'	Report	Try: Day 28' c Newton 37' m Maule 59' c Fa'amatuainu 76' c Con: Priestland (3/4); Pen: Priestland 10', 18', 72'; Newton 45'

Stadio Comunale di Monigo
Attendance: 3,800
Referee: Peter Allan (Scotland)

19 December 2010
15:00

Leicester Tigers (England)	22 - 22	(France) Perpignan
Try: A. Tuilagi 32' c Con: Twelvetrees (1/1); Pen: Twelvetrees (5) 11', 28', 47', 56', 65'	Report	Try: Mélé 42' c Con: Laharrague (1/1); Pen: Laharrague (4) 29', 40', 62', 79'; Drop: Laharrague 8'

Welford Road
Attendance: 19,519
Referee: Peter Fitzgibbon (Ireland)

15 January 2011
14:30

Benetton Treviso (Italy)	9 – 44	(France) Perpignan
Pen: de Waal (3/3) 13', 25', 28'	Report	Try: Le Corvec 46' c Sid 56' c N. Laharrague 60' c Candelon (2) 71' c, 80' c Con: Porical (4/4); N. Laharrague (1/1); Pen: Porical (3/5) 7', 30' 34'

Stadio Comunale di Monigo
Attendance: 4,000
Referee: Alan Lewis (Ireland)

15 January 2011
17:45

Scarlets (Wales)	18 – 32	(England) Leicester Tigers
Try: Stoddart 19' c Lamont 80'+1' m Con: S. Jones (1/2); Pen: S. Jones (2/3) 32', 46'	Report	Try: A. Tuilagi 51' m Youngs 61' m Mafi 78' c Con: Flood (1/3); Pen: Flood (5/6) 10', 17', 42', 68', 71'

Parc y Scarlets
Attendance: 12,392
Referee: Alain Rolland (Ireland)

23 January 2011
14:00

Leicester Tigers (England)	62 – 15	(Italy) Benetton Treviso
Try: Crane (3) 18' m, 32' c, 42' c Hamilton (2) 28' c, 71' c A. Tuilagi 39' c Waldrom 48' c M. Tuilagi 78' c Mafi 80' m Con: Flood (7/9); Pen: Flood (1/1) 9'	Report	Try: Williams 51' c Sgarbi 60' m Con: Burton (1/2); Drop: Burton 1'

Welford Road
Attendance: 17,601
Referee: Romain Poite (France)

23 January 2011
15:00

Perpignan (France)	37 – 5	(Wales) Scarlets
Try: Porical 5' m Tuilagi 10' c Sid 31' c Cazenave 47' c Britz 67' m Con: Porical (2/3); Laharrague (1/2); Pen: Laharrague (2/2) 40'+2', 52'	Report	Try: Davies 45' m

Stade Aimé Giral
Attendance: 13,719
Referee: Dave Pearson (England)

=== Pool 6 ===
Team	P	W	D	L	Tries for	Tries against	Try diff	Points for	Points against	Points diff	TB	LB	Pts
(France) Toulouse (5)	6	5	0	1	15	6	+10	155	85	+70	1	1	22
(England) London Wasps [5]	6	4	0	2	15	6	+8	145	106	+59	2	1	19
(Scotland) Glasgow Warriors	6	3	0	3	10	15	−5	116	141	−25	0	0	12
(Wales) Newport Gwent Dragons	6	0	0	6	5	18	−13	77	161	−84	0	2	2

8 October 2010
19:30

Glasgow Warriors (Scotland)	21 – 13	(Wales) Newport Gwent Dragons
Try: Morrison 24' c Thomson 44' m Con: Jackson (1/2); Pen: Jackson (3/3) 21', 24', 31'; Weir (0/1)	Report	Try: Hughes 18' c Con: M. Jones (1/1); Pen: M. Jones (2/3) 40', 43'

Firhill Arena, Glasgow
Attendance: 2,597
Referee: Jérôme Garces (France)

10 October 2010
16:00

Toulouse (France)	18 – 16	(England) London Wasps
Pen: Skrela (6/7) 11', 17', 30', 60', 64', 73'	Report	Try: Lemi 65' c Con: Walder (1/1); Pen: Walder (2/3) 5', 13'; Drop: Walder 37'

Stade Municipal, Toulouse
Attendance: 26,928
Referee: George Clancy (Ireland)

16 October 2010
17:45

Newport Gwent Dragons (Wales)	19 – 40	(France) Toulouse
Try: Harries 68' c Con: M. Jones (1/1); Pen: M. Jones (4/5) 1', 12', 21', 33'	Report	Try: Dusautoir 43' c Médard 63' c Picamoles 74' m Con: Skrela (2/3); Pen: Skrela (4/4) 14', 19', 23', 28'; Fritz (2/2) 36', 41'; Drop: Skrela (1/1) 4'

Rodney Parade, Newport
Attendance: 6,401
Referee: Andrew Small (England)

17 October 2010
13:00

London Wasps (England)	38 – 26	(Scotland) Glasgow Warriors
Try: Simpson 7' m Varndell 25' c Jacobs 39' c Waldouck 63' c Con: Walder (3/4); Pen: Walder (4/5) 18', 21', 34', 50'	Report	Try: Jackson 28' c Hall 67' c Con: Jackson (1/1); Hall (1/1); Pen: Jackson (4/5) 16', 32', 48', 59'

Adams Park, High Wycombe
Attendance: 6,759
Referee: Pascal Gauzere (France)

10 December 2010
20:00

Glasgow Warriors (Scotland)	16 - 28	(France) Toulouse
Try: Martín Aramburú 24' c Con: Jackson (1/1); Pen: Jackson (3/5) 1', 11', 38'	Report	Try: Fritz 7' c Jauzion 22' c Heymans 35' m Con: Skrela (2/3); Pen: Skrela (3/3) 17', 32', 51'

Firhill Arena
Attendance: 2,946
Referee: James Jones (Wales)

12 December 2010
13:00

Newport Gwent Dragons (Wales)	16 - 23	(England) London Wasps
Try: Smith 8' c Con: Tovey (1/1); Pen: Tovey (2/4) 1', 26'; Drop: Tovey (1/1) 28'	Report	Try: Jacobs 23' c Lemi 45' m Varndell 55' m Con: Walder (1/3); Pen: Walder (2/4) 18', 33'

Cardiff City Stadium, Cardiff
Attendance: 3,432
Referee: Peter Allan (Scotland)

21 December 2010
19:00

Toulouse (France)	36 - 10	(Scotland) Glasgow Warriors
Try: Médard 10' c Lacombe 23' c Poitrenaud 55' c Dusautoir 64' c Clerc 67' m Con: Skrela (4/5); Pen: Skrela 43'	Report	Try: Van der Merwe 41' c Con: Jackson (1/1); Pen: Jackson 17'

Stade Ernest Wallon, Toulouse
Attendance: 18,418
Referee: John Lacey (Ireland)

- This match was postponed twice from its originally scheduled kickoff of 18 December. Weather-related travel delays prevented Glasgow from arriving in Toulouse until hours before the planned kickoff, causing a postponement to 19 December. The team's equipment, which was travelling on a separate flight, was further delayed, leading to the second postponement.

19 December 2010
13:00

London Wasps (England)	37 - 10	(Wales) Newport Gwent Dragons
Try: Ward 49' c van Gisbergen 65' c Varndell 70' c Berry 73' c Con: Walder (4/4); Pen: Walder (3) 40', 42', 53'	Report	Try: Brew 78' c Con: Jones (1/1); Pen: Jones 8'

Adams Park
Attendance: 1,236
Referee: Christophe Berdos (France)

15 January 2011
14:30

Toulouse (France)	17 – 3	(Wales) Newport Gwent Dragons
Try: Dusautoir (2) 12' m, 69' c Clerc 35' m Con: Skrela (1/3)	Report	Pen: Tovey 38'

Stade Ernest Wallon
Attendance: 17,766
Referee: Peter Fitzgibbon (Ireland)

16 January 2011
13:00

Glasgow Warriors (Scotland)	20 - 10	(England) London Wasps
Try: Gregor 49' m Pen: Jackson (4/6) 2', 15', 43', 65'; Drop: Jackson 75'	Report	Try: Varndell 11' c Con: Walder (1/1); Pen: Walder (1/2) 6'

Firhill Arena
Attendance: 2,564
Referee: James Jones (Wales)

23 January 2011
15:00

Newport Gwent Dragons (Wales)	16 – 23	(Scotland) Glasgow Warriors
Try: Brew 49' c Con: Tovey (1/1); Pen: Tovey (2/4) 38', 45'; Drop: Tovey 15'	Report	Try: Gregor 55' m Van der Merwe (2) 64' m, 71' c Con: Jackson (1/3); Pen: Jackson (2/2) 4', 32'

Rodney Parade
Attendance: 5,284
Referee: JP Doyle (England)

23 January 2011
15:00

London Wasps (England)	21 – 16	(France) Toulouse
Try: Haughton 34' c Lemi 80' m Con: Walder (1/2); Pen: Walder (3/3) 26', 38', 48'	Report	Try: Jauzion 11' c Con: Skrela; Pen: Skrela (3/3) 51', 62', 65'

Adams Park
Attendance: 10,014
Referee: Alain Rolland (Ireland)

=== Seeding and runners-up ===
- Bare numbers indicate Heineken Cup quarter-final seeding.
- Numbers with "C" indicate Challenge Cup quarter-final seeding.

Seed	Pool Winners	Pts	TF	+/−
1	(England) Northampton Saints	25	16	+68
2	(Ireland) Leinster	24	21	+75
3	(France) Perpignan	22	23	+84
4	(France) Biarritz	22	16	+55
5	(France) Toulouse	22	15	+70
6	(France) Toulon	17	11	+21
Seed	Pool Runners-up	Pts	TF	+/−
7	(England) Leicester Tigers	22	25	+97
8	(Ireland) Ulster	22	15	+52
5C	(England) London Wasps	19	15	+39
6C	(France) Clermont	19	14	+20
7C	(Ireland) Munster	16	17	+21
–	(Wales) Cardiff Blues	14	6	–6

== See also ==
- 2010-11 Heineken Cup
