= Laharrague =

Laharrague is a Basque surname. Notable people with the surname include:

- Julien Laharrague (born 1978), French rugby union player
- Nicolas Laharrague (born 1981), French rugby union player
