= Dan Scarbrough =

England international rugby union player

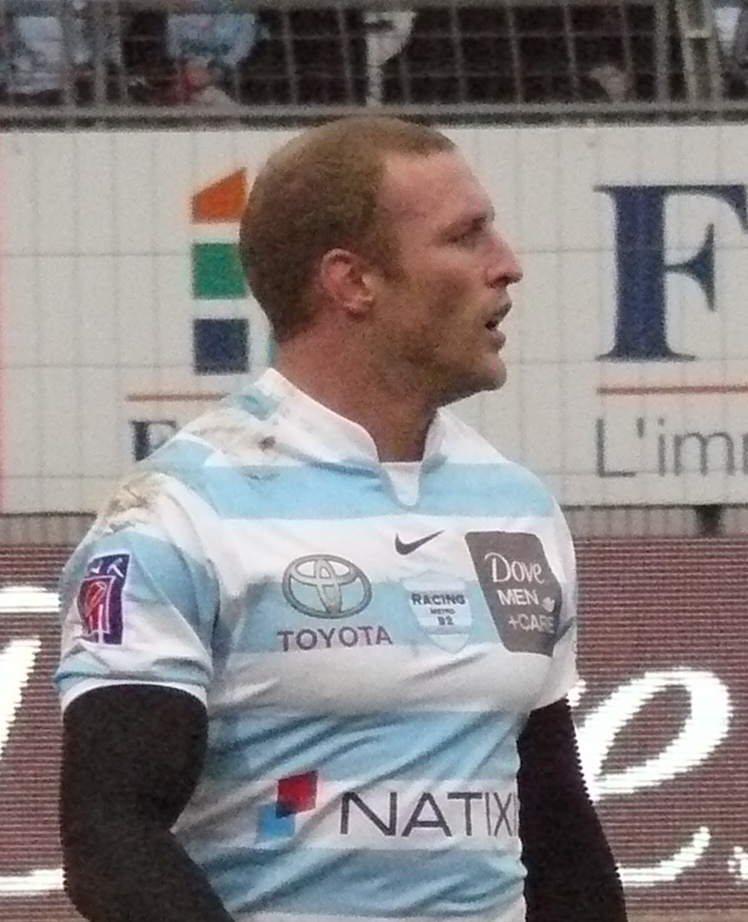
- Scarbrough in 2010
- Born: Daniel Scarbrough; 16 February 1978 (age 48) Bingley, Yorkshire, England
- Height: 1.84 m (6 ft 0 in)
- Weight: 90 kg (14 st 2 lb)

Rugby union career
- Position: Wing / Full-back
- Current team: Racing Métro
Youth career
- Bradford Salem, Broughton Park, Wakefield
Senior career
Years	Team	Apps	(Points)
- Wakefield RFC
2001-04	Leeds Tykes	59	(135)
2004-08	Saracens	66	(66)
2008-11	Racing Métro		
2011-13	Lille MR		
International career
Years	Team	Apps	(Points)
2003-07	England	2	(5)

Dan Scarbrough (born 16 February 1978) is a former rugby union international, at 7's and 15's, who played on the wing or full back for Leeds Tykes, Saracens, Racing Métro, and England.

== Career ==
He was National Division One leading try scorer with Wakefield for two seasons from 1999/2000 for whom he scored 17 tries from 46 starts and 2 as replacement before moving to Leeds Tykes where he continued his try scoring exploits, finishing top try scorer whilst and Leeds for 3 seasons running, second in the 2001/2002 list of Zurich Premiership scorers and making the Premiership dream team.

This earned him a place in the final two England A matches of 2002 and he played in all four A games during 2003. Equally at home at wing or full back and instantly recognisable by his blond hair, he played in the first Churchill Cup in 2003. He also played in his second successive Churchill Cup in June 2004 as part of the England side which lost out in the final to New Zealand Māori after going into extra time following a draw on the full-time whistle.

He was considered an outside candidate to be part of Clive Woodward's ultimately victorious 2003 Rugby World Cup winning squad. However, he was overlooked in the end, despite getting his first cap against Wales in one of England's warm up games prior to the World Cup, and being in the wider 43-man squad.

Scarbrough has also been capped for England in the Sevens, playing in four IRB World tournaments, most notably winning the Hong Kong Sevens Tournament with England in 2004.

He moved from Leeds Tykes to Saracens in 2004, making his debut against Wasps in 4/9/04.

Scarbrough was blighted by injuries after his first cap but flew out to South Africa to join the pre World Cup squad in 2007, four years after his 1st full cap. He had been pulled across from England Saxons' Barclays Churchill Cup squad after David Strettle fell ill with a virus. The Saracens flier started on the wing at Loftus Versfeld and scored England's only try in the 55–22 defeat. He also infamously put a huge tackle on Percy Montgomery during that game.

Joining Saracens from Leeds Tykes in 2004, Scarbrough further established himself as a potent attacking weapon, leading the try scoring for the 2005/06 season.

A series of injuries in particular, a shoulder reconstruction, reduced his first team appearances to just eight in that first season. He played 40 times for the Men in Black the next season at both wing and full back and was beginning to show the form that made him one of Leeds Tykes most prolific try scorers.

In January 2009, under Eddie Jones, following a long-term knee injury, it was announced that he had left the club by mutual consent. and signed for the big hitting and spending French side Racing Métro. After 3 solid years in the Top 14 Scarbrough began playing and coaching at Lille Metropole Rugby Club in 2012 in their bid for promotion to the French Pro d2.

Following his playing career Scarbrough has now begun a new career as coach and teacher; currently Head of Rugby at Bradford Grammar School and formerly Queen Ethelburga's with his old Leeds Tykes teammate Rob Rawlinson.

Now a Level 3 rugby coach, he has coached internationally and took Latvia rugby sevens team to the European Trophy in Croatia and Lithuania, beating Lithuania national team for the first time Ever and finishing 3rd.
