= 2005–06 Heineken Cup =

International rugby union competition

Tournament details
- Countries: England; France; Ireland; Italy; Scotland; Wales
- Tournament format(s): Round-robin and Knockout
- Date: 21 October 2005 – 20 May 2006

Tournament statistics
- Teams: 24
- Matches played: 79
- Attendance: 964,863 (12,213 per match)
- Top point scorer(s): Felipe Contepomi (Leinster) (129 points)
- Top try scorer(s): Sireli Bobo (Biarritz); Vincent Clerc (Toulouse); Felipe Contepomi (Leinster) (6 tries)

Final
- Venue: Millennium Stadium, Cardiff
- Attendance: 74,534
- Champions: (Ireland) Munster (1st title)
- Runners-up: (France) Biarritz

The 2005–06 Heineken Cup was the eleventh edition of the European Heineken Cup rugby union club tournament. 24 teams from 7 countries took part, with the opening game played on Friday October 21, 2005. Munster won the tournament, beating Biarritz in the final held at Millennium Stadium, Cardiff, on 20 May 2006.

The teams were divided into six pools of four, in which teams played home and away matches against each other. The winners of the pools, together with the two best runners-up, qualified for the knock-out stage.

== Format ==
In the pool matches, teams receive:

- four points for a win
- two points for a draw
- a bonus point for scoring four or more tries
- a bonus point for losing by seven or fewer points

Ties between two teams are broken in the following order:

1. Match points earned in head-to-head matches. For example, if tied teams are in the same pool, and split their head-to-head matches, but one team earned a bonus point and the other failed to do so, the team that earned the bonus point will win. Munster won a tiebreaker over Sale Sharks in Pool 1 in this very manner.
2. Tries scored in head-to-head matches.
3. Point difference in head-to-head matches.
4. Tries scored in all pool matches. This is the first tiebreaker between teams in different pools, which can come into play for determining seeding among first-place teams, or breaking ties among second-place teams.
5. Point difference in all pool matches.
6. Best disciplinary record in pool play. The team with the fewest players sent off or sin-binned during pool play wins.
7. Coin toss.

The quarterfinals are seeded from 1 to 8. The six pool winners receive the top six seeds, based on their point totals. The top two-second-place finishers are seeded 7 and 8. The seeds of the qualifying teams are in parentheses next to their names in the tables.

== Teams ==
France	England	Wales	Ireland	Scotland	Italy
(France) Castres; (France) Perpignan; (France) Stade Français; (France) Clermont Auvergne; (France) Biarritz; (France) Bourgoin; (France) Toulouse	(England) Sale Sharks; (England) Leeds Tykes; (England) Leicester Tigers; (England) Saracens; (England) Bath; (England) London Wasps	(Wales) Newport Gwent Dragons; (Wales) Cardiff Blues; (Wales) Ospreys; (Wales) Llanelli Scarlets	(Ireland) Munster; (Ireland) Ulster; (Ireland) Leinster	(Scotland) Glasgow; (Scotland) Edinburgh	(Italy) Calvisano; (Italy) Benetton Treviso

== Pool stage ==
Full results can be found at 2005–06 Heineken Cup pool stage.
All times are local to the match location.

=== Pool 1 ===
Team	P	W	D	L	Tries for	Tries against	Try diff	Points for	Points against	Points diff	TB	LB	Pts
(Ireland) Munster (4)	6	5	0	1	22	6	16	186	87	99	3	0	23
(England) Sale Sharks (7)	6	5	0	1	17	9	8	159	84	75	3	0	23
(Wales) Newport Gwent Dragons	6	1	0	5	14	20	−6	99	168	−69	1	1	6
(France) Castres	6	1	0	5	8	26	−18	90	195	−105	1	1	6

Note: Munster took first place over Sale Sharks on competition points in head-to-head matches, 5–4.

=== Pool 2 ===
Team	P	W	D	L	Tries for	Tries against	Try diff	Points for	Points against	Points diff	TB	LB	Pts
(France) Perpignan (5)	6	5	0	1	20	5	15	160	52	108	2	1	23
(England) Leeds Tykes	6	4	0	2	19	9	10	143	91	52	3	1	20
(Wales) Cardiff Blues	6	3	0	3	16	18	−2	128	145	−17	3	0	15
(Italy) Calvisano	6	0	0	6	4	27	−23	48	191	−143	0	0	0

=== Pool 3 ===
Team	P	W	D	L	Tries for	Tries against	Try diff	Points for	Points against	Points diff	TB	LB	Pts
(England) Leicester Tigers (3)	6	5	0	1	19	10	9	179	111	68	3	1	24
(France) Stade Français	6	4	0	2	16	7	9	148	98	50	2	2	20
(Wales) Ospreys	6	2	0	4	9	20	−11	90	144	−54	0	1	9
(France) Clermont Auvergne	6	1	0	5	14	21	−7	136	200	−64	1	1	6

=== Pool 4 ===
Team	P	W	D	L	Tries for	Tries against	Try diff	Points for	Points against	Points diff	TB	LB	Pts
(France) Biarritz (2)	6	5	0	1	24	10	14	182	93	89	4	0	24
(England) Saracens	6	4	0	2	12	13	−1	128	129	−1	1	0	17
(Ireland) Ulster	6	3	0	3	15	13	2	126	111	15	2	0	14
(Italy) Benetton Treviso	6	0	0	6	13	28	−15	104	207	−103	2	1	3

=== Pool 5 ===
Team	P	W	D	L	Tries for	Tries against	Try diff	Points for	Points against	Points diff	TB	LB	Pts
(England) Bath (6)	6	5	0	1	18	9	9	166	111	55	3	0	23
(Ireland) Leinster (8)	6	4	0	2	28	13	15	214	124	90	4	2	22
(France) Bourgoin	6	2	0	4	9	24	−15	109	195	−86	1	0	9
(Scotland) Glasgow	6	1	0	5	16	25	−9	131	190	−59	1	1	6

=== Pool 6 ===
Team	P	W	D	L	Tries for	Tries against	Try diff	Points for	Points against	Points diff	TB	LB	Pts
(France) Toulouse (1)	6	5	1	0	22	11	11	188	124	64	3	0	25
(England) Wasps	6	2	1	3	18	13	5	173	118	55	2	2	14
(Wales) Llanelli Scarlets	6	2	0	4	18	26	−8	152	206	−54	2	2	12
(Scotland) Edinburgh	6	2	0	4	14	22	−8	121	186	−65	1	2	11

== Seeding and runners-up ==
Seed	Pool Winners	Pts	TF	+/−
1	(France) Toulouse	25	22	+64
2	(France) Biarritz	24	24	+89
3	(England) Leicester Tigers	24	19	+68
4	(Ireland) Munster	23	22	+99
5	(France) Perpignan	23	20	+108
6	(England) Bath	23	18	+55
Seed	Pool runners-up	Pts	TF	+/−
7	(England) Sale Sharks	23	17	+75
8	(Ireland) Leinster	22	28	+90
–	(England) Leeds Tykes	20	19	+108
–	(France) Stade Français	20	16	+50
–	(England) Saracens	17	12	−1
–	(England) London Wasps	14	18	+55

== Knockout stage ==
=== Quarter-finals ===
1 April 2006
12:30

Leicester Tigers (England)	12–15	(England) Bath
Pen: Goode (4) 2', 18', 33', 45'	Report	Pen: Malone (5) 7', 28', 31', 51', 62'

Walkers Stadium, Leicester
Attendance: 32,500
Referee: Joël Jutge (France)

1 April 2006
16:00

Toulouse (France)	35–41	(Ireland) Leinster
Try: Nyanga 73' c Jauzion 80' c Con: Élissalde (2); Pen: Élissalde (6) 6', 12', 32', 42', 48', 57'; Drop: Michalak 50'	Report	Try: O'Driscoll 24' c Jowitt 53' c Hickie 59' m Horgan 63' c Con: Contepomi (3); Pen: Contepomi (5) 9', 16', 18', 34', 67'

Stade de Toulouse, Toulouse
Attendance: 37,815
Referee: Dave Pearson (England)

1 April 2006
17:30

Munster (Ireland)	19–10	(France) Perpignan
Try: O'Connell 20' c Con: O'Gara; Pen: O'Gara (4) 41', 46', 65', 68'	Report	Try: Bourret 28' c Con: Bourret; Pen: Bourret 36'

Lansdowne Road, Dublin
Attendance: 48,500
Referee: Nigel Whitehouse (Wales)

2 April 2006
18:00

Biarritz (France)	11–6	(England) Sale Sharks
Try: Bobo 32' m Pen: Yachvili (2) 20', 26'	Report	Pen: Hodgson (2) 25', 75'

Estadio Anoeta, San Sebastián
Attendance: 32,000
Referee: Alan Lewis (Ireland)

=== Semi-finals ===
22 April 2006
15:00

Biarritz (France)	18–9	(England) Bath
Pen: Yachvili (5) 4', 16', 21', 43', 78'; Drop: Traille 45'	Report	Pen: Malone (3) 17', 23', 64'

Estadio Anoeta, San Sebastián
Attendance: 31,700
Referee: Alain Rolland (Ireland)

23 April 2006
15:00

Leinster (Ireland)	6–30	(Ireland) Munster
Pen: Contepomi (2) 22', 71'	Report	Try: Leamy 10' c O'Gara 74' c Halstead 80' c Con: O'Gara (3); Pen: O'Gara (3) 2', 24', 32'

Lansdowne Road, Dublin
Attendance: 47,800
Referee: Joël Jutge (France)

=== Final ===
20 May 2006
15:00

Biarritz (France)	19–23	(Ireland) Munster
Try: Bobo 2' c Con: Yachvili; Pen: Yachvili (4) 22', 48', 51', 70'	Report	Try: Halstead 17' c Stringer 31' c Con: O'Gara (2); Pen: O'Gara (3) 7', 42', 73'

Millennium Stadium, Cardiff
Attendance: 74,534
Referee: Chris White (England)

== Statistics ==
=== Top point scorers ===
- 131 – Felipe Contepomi (Leinster)
- 115 – Ronan O'Gara (Munster)
- 99 – Andy Goode (Leicester Tigers)

=== Top try scorers ===
- 6 – Sireli Bobo (Biarritz Olympique)
- 6 – Vincent Clerc (Toulouse)
- 6 – Felipe Contepomi (Leinster)
