= Holtby (surname) =

Holtby is a surname. Notable people with the surname include:

- Braden Holtby (born 1989), Canadian ice hockey player
- John Holtby (born 1982), English rugby union player
- Lewis Holtby (born 1990), German footballer
- Richard Holtby (1553–1640), English Jesuit Superior and Roman Catholic priest
- Winifred Holtby (1898–1935), English novelist and journalist
