= Gerry Ainscough =

English rugby union footballer

- Full name: Gerry Christopher Ainscough
- Born: 7 August 1964 (age 62) Wigan, England
- School: St. Thomas More High School

Rugby union career
- Position: Fly-half
Senior career
Years	Team	Apps	(Points)
1977–1992	Orrell		
1992–1993	Leicester		
1993–1996	Orrell		
1996–1998	Leeds Tykes		
- Correct as of 16:30, 25 June 2008 (UTC)
International career
Years	Team	Apps	(Points)
1989–1995	England 'B'		
–	England VII's		
- Correct as of 25 June 2008

Gerry Christopher Ainscough (born 7 August 1964, in Wigan, England) is a former rugby union fly half.

== Career ==
He joined Orrell as a 14-year-old in 1977. Progressing through the Juniors into the Colts, he was a member of the Colts side of 1982/83 that won all 7 trophies entered, despite losing to Blackburn XV twice, 0-33 at home & 22-9 away. He made his first team debut as a 19-year-old against Northern in November 1983. He played in two Lancashire Cup winning sides and three losing Pilkington Cup semi-finals (Bath 1987, Northampton 1991 and Leicester 1994). During his first spell at Orrell he represented Lancashire (1985 to 1993), North of England (1989 to 1993) and England 'B' (1989) and spent the summer of 1990 playing for the Waratah's in Wollongong, Australia.

He moved to Leicester Tigers for the 1992/93 season and, although scoring some spectacular tries at Welford Road and again representing England 'B', overall he had a mixed season losing another Pilkington Cup semi-final against Harlequins in a team transitioning into the major force it was to become later in the 1990s. He returned to Orrell in September 1993, and played his last game in April 1995, the final Courage League game of the 1994/95 season versus Wasps at Sudbury. In the last season of his second stint at Orrell he played for England VII's in 1995.

He joined Phil Davies at Leeds Tykes in January 1996 and was the club's top points scorer in 1996/1997 with 307. During that prolific season he set two club records – most conversions in a match (9 v Clifton 7 December 1996, still the club record) and most points in a match (27 v Rosslyn Park 14 September 1996).

He retired in 1998.
