= Gareth Chapman =

- Born: Gareth Chapman; 16 April 1981 (age 45) Newport, Wales

Rugby union career
- Current team: Newport RFC
Senior career
Years	Team	Apps	(Points)
2004–2007	Newport GD	15	(25)

Gareth Chapman (born 16 April 1981) is a Welsh rugby union player. A centre, he joined Cardiff RFC in September 2007 from Welsh regional side Newport Gwent Dragons. In May 2010 Chapman joined Newport RFC.

He is currently teaching at Llanwern high school, formally Hartridge High School in Newport.
