= John Holtby =

English rugby union player

John Norman Holtby (born 27 March 1982 in Beverley) is a rugby union player currently playing wing for Birmingham & Solihull. He has played play premiership rugby for Leicester Tigers and Leeds (now Yorkshire Carnegie) and has participated in the Heineken Cup.

== Rugby career ==
Holtby started playing rugby at the age of ten for his local club in Beverley. He went on to play for Hull Ionians and Loughborough University before joining the academy at Leicester Tigers.

He played premiership rugby for Leicester Tigers in the 2002–03, 2003–04 and 2004–05 seasons, second tier rugby for Earth Titans (Rotherham) in the 2005–06 season and premiership rugby for Leeds in the 2006–07 and 2007–08 seasons.

After he left Leeds he played for Stourbridge before joining Birmingham & Solihull.

== Personal life ==
Holtby attended Hull Grammar School where he also took part in athletics and football and he has represented Great Britain in athletics.

He studied Engineering and Sports Technology at Loughborough University.

He was a fitness coach on the Gladiators TV show.
