= Tom Palmer (rugby union) =

England international rugby union player (born 1979)

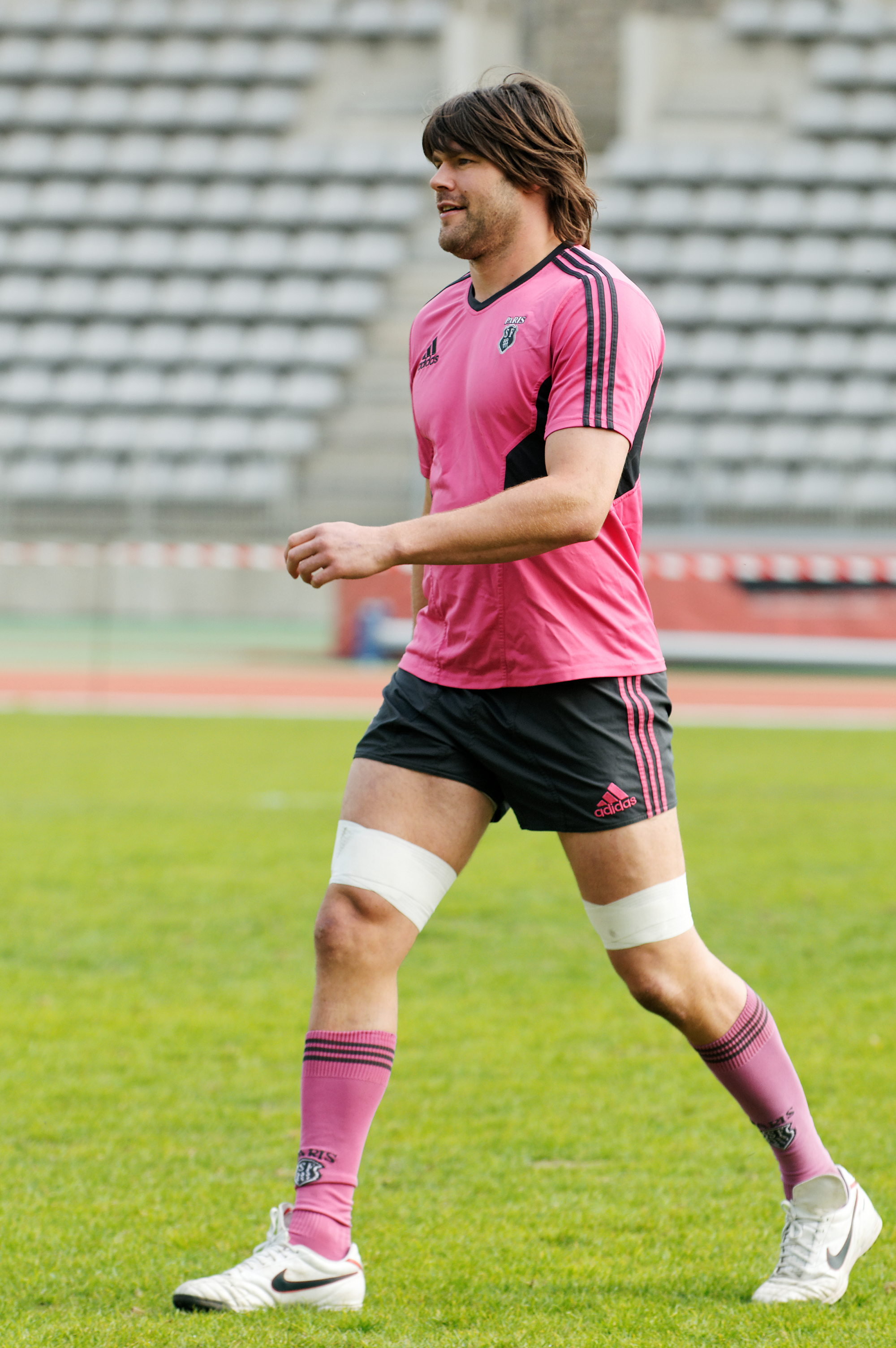
- Palmer in 2012
- Born: Thomas Phillip Palmer; 27 March 1979 (age 47) Harringay, London, England
- Height: 2 m (6 ft 7 in)
- Weight: 118 kg (18 st 8 lb)
- School: Boroughmuir High School; Otago Boys' High School
- University: University of Leeds

Rugby union career
- Position: Lock
Youth career
- Barnet
- Boroughmuir RFC
Senior career
Years	Team	Apps	(Points)
1997–2006	Leeds Tykes	190	(105)
2006–2009	Wasps	55	(20)
2009–2012	Stade Français	69	(0)
2012–2014	Wasps	52	(5)
2014–2015	Gloucester	22	(0)
2015–2016	Treviso	18	(0)
2016–2017	Bordeaux Begles	13	(0)
1997-2017	Total	419	(130)
International career
Years	Team	Apps	(Points)
2001-2012	England Saxons		
2001-2012	England	42	(0)
Coaching career
- Years: Team
- 2018–2019: Aurillac defence
- 2019–2021: Rouen forwards & defence
- 2021–: Vannes forwards

Tom Palmer (born 27 March 1979 in Harringay, London) is a former English rugby union player. His position is a lock

== Early career ==
He started playing mini rugby at age five with Barnet. Aged six he moved to Edinburgh, Scotland with his family, where he played for Boroughmuir RFC minis and Boroughmuir High School until he was 16. After his Highers, Palmer deferred his place at the University of Leeds for a year while he went to New Zealand. He spent 18 months at Otago Boys' High School, where he played for New Zealand Schoolboys before returning to the United Kingdom to start a degree course in Physics at the University of Leeds.

== Club career ==
He joined Leeds Tykes in 1997 and played for the U19's during his first year at university. He also won selection for the Scotland U19 and U21 sides. He then studied part-time when he was drafted into the first team squad in September 1998. He became the Tykes' first England international and the club's second longest serving player after Mike Shelley.

Palmer made his debut against Blackheath on 2 September 1998, making a total of 10 appearances for the Tykes during his first season when they finished in 6th place in National Division 2. Palmer became a regular first team player during the 1999-00 National Division One, missing only 4 games throughout the season. The most notable game for Palmer was against Worcester in November 1999 when he scored his first try in the 20–9 win at Headingley.

In the 2000–01 National Division One the Tykes finished top of Division 1. Palmer again played an important role in the side, making a total 20 appearances and scoring 8 tries. In the Tetley's Bitter Cup competition in October, Palmer was one of nine try scorers who helped the Tykes to a magnificent 100–0 win over Morley.

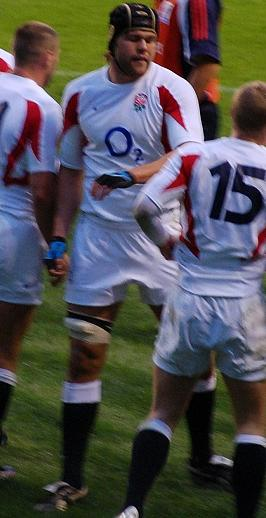
Palmer in action for England

In the Tykes' first season in the Premiership, the 2001–02 Zurich Premiership. Palmer began in his now regular central role, making 15 appearances, however during a game between England Saxons and Wales A Palmer broke his leg. The injury meant that the loss against Northampton Saints in March was the last game he featured in during the season.

Palmer became one of four players to have played 100 games for the Tykes, he also became the club's youngest captain and collected a Powergen Cup winners medal, the final of which he started.

Palmer joined London Wasps after Leeds Tykes were relegated from the 2005–06 Guinness Premiership, overall, he made 188 appearances at Leeds between 1998 and 2006 scoring 20 tries. At Wasps he quickly became first choice lock, winning the 2006–07 Heineken Cup and the 2007–08 Guinness Premiership. Palmer signed for Stade Français in the summer of 2009. On 13 February 2012, Palmer returned to London Wasps from France on a two-year deal for the next season.

On 28 March 2014 it was announced that Palmer would join Gloucester Rugby at the end of the season. On 2 June 2015, Palmer joined Italy region Benetton Treviso in the Pro12 from the 2015–16 season.

On 27 September 2016, Palmer signed as a medical joker for French club Bordeaux Begles in the Top 14 for the rest of the 2016–17 season.

== International career ==
He earned a place in the England Saxons squad whilst still playing in National Division One and was then rewarded with a place on the England Summer tour to North America in 2001. After appearing in the midweek sides, he won his first senior cap as a replacement for Steve Borthwick in the final 10 minutes of England's victory over the United States in San Francisco on 16 June 2001.

Palmer was back to full fitness for the start of the 2002–03 Zurich Premiership and did not miss a game for the Tykes during the entire Zurich Premiership campaign. In the summer of 2003 he was selected for England's summer tour to New Zealand and Australia and then joined up with the squad for the 2003 Churchill Cup in Canada, only to pick up a serious knee injury that took six months to put right. In March 2004, he was vice captain to Mike Catt in the England Saxons side narrowly defeated 22–26 by France A.

After playing in the 2007 Six Nations Championship, Palmer made the training squad for the 2007 Rugby World Cup. He did not make the final 30-man squad.

He played for England Saxons as they defeated the Ireland Wolfhounds on 1 February 2008. In the summer of 2010, Palmer started as England defeated Australia in Sydney. He played for England in the 2011 Rugby World Cup.
