= André Snyman =

South African rugby union player

- Full name: Andries Hendrik Snyman
- Born: 2 February 1974 (age 52) Newcastle, South Africa
- Height: 1.87 m (6 ft 1 1/2 in)
- Weight: 100 kg (15 st 10 lb; 220 lb)
- School: Dundee High School, Dundee
- University: Pretoria Technicon

Rugby union career
- Position: Centre / Winger
Senior career
Years	Team	Apps	(Points)
1995–1999	Blue Bulls		
1998–1999	Bulls	15	(5)
2000–2003	Sharks (Currie Cup)		
2001–2003	Sharks	24	(30)
2004–2006	Leeds Tykes		
2006–2007	Perpignan		
- Correct as of 8 July 2015
International career
Years	Team	Apps	(Points)
1996–2006	South Africa (test)	38	(50)
1996–2006	South Africa (tour)	4	(5)
1997	South Africa Sevens		
- Correct as of 8 July 2015
Coaching career
- Years: Team
- 2011–present: Glendale Raptors
- 2016: PRO Rugby (tech. adviser)

Andries Hendrik Snyman (born 2 February 1974) is a South African rugby union former player and current coach. His usual position was outside centre, but he had success on the wing at international level. Snyman earned 38 test caps for the South Africa national rugby union team, before retiring from playing in 2007. Snyman has been coaching rugby in the United States since 2011.

== Playing career ==
Snyman was born in Newcastle, South Africa. Snyman made his Springbok debut in 1996 against the All Blacks in Durban. He went on to play 38 times for the Springboks and played his final international test match against Scotland in June 2006. Snyman played for the Blue Bulls from 1995 to 1999 and then joined the Sharks from 2000 to 2003. Snyman joined English club Leeds Tykes for the 2003 season. During his time at Leeds he helped them win the 2004–05 Powergen Cup, in the final of which he scored a try.

He later moved to France, signing with USA Perpignan for the 2006–07 season. However, Snyman returned to the Tykes on loan in December 2006 in order to help their National Division One campaign. He made his debut for the Tykes against Northampton, the same day England won the 2003 Rugby World Cup. He scored one of the Leeds tries in the famous Powergen Cup Final against Bath, intercepting a pass from 80 m. Snyman finally retired from professional rugby at the end of the 2007 season.

In 2012 and 2013, Snyman represented the United States of America at the Rugby World Classics Tournament in Bermuda.

Snyman represented the South African sevens team at the 1997 Rugby World Cup Sevens in Hong Kong where they lost to Fiji in the final, 24–21.

=== Test history ===
No.	Opposition	Result (SA 1st)	Position	Tries	Date	Venue
1.	New Zealand	19–23	Centre		17 Aug 1996	Kings Park, Durban
2.	New Zealand	26–33	Centre		24 Aug 1996	Loftus Versfeld, Pretoria
3.	Argentina	44–21	Replacement		16 Nov 1996	Ferro Carril Oeste, Buenos Aires
4.	Wales	37–20	Replacement		15 Dec 1996	Cardiff Arms Park, Cardiff
5.	Tonga	74–10	Wing	3	10 Jun 1997	Newlands, Cape Town
6.	British Lions	16–25	Wing		21 Jun 1997	Newlands, Cape Town
7.	(British & Irish Lions) British Lions	15–18	Wing		28 Jun 1997	Kings Park, Durban
8.	(British & Irish Lions) British Lions	35–16	Wing	1	5 Jul 1997	Ellis Park, Johannesburg
9.	New Zealand	32–35	Wing		19 Jul 1997	Ellis Park, Johannesburg
10.	Australia	20–32	Wing		2 Aug 1997	Suncorp Stadium, Brisbane
11.	New Zealand	35–55	Wing		9 Aug 1997	Eden Park, Auckland
12.	Australia	61–22	Wing		23 Aug 1997	Loftus Versfeld, Pretoria
13.	Italy	61–31	Centre		8 Nov 1997	Dall'Ara Stadium, Bologna
14.	France	36–32	Centre		15 Nov 1997	Stade de Gerland, Lyon
15.	France	52–10	Centre	1	22 Nov 1997	Parc des Princes, Paris
16.	England	29–11	Centre	1	29 Nov 1997	Twickenham, London
17.	Scotland	68–10	Centre	1	6 Dec 1997	Murrayfield, Edinburgh
18.	Ireland	37–13	Centre		13 Jun 1998	Free State Stadium, Bloemfontein
19.	Ireland	33–0	Centre		20 Jun 1998	Loftus Versfeld, Pretoria
20.	Wales	96–13	Centre		27 Jun 1998	Loftus Versfeld, Pretoria
21.	England	18–0	Centre		4 Jul 1998	Newlands, Cape Town
22.	Australia	14–13	Centre		18 Jul 1998	Subiaco Oval, Perth
23.	New Zealand	13–3	Centre		25 Jul 1998	Athletic Park, Wellington
24.	New Zealand	24–23	Centre		15 Aug 1998	Kings Park, Durban
25.	Australia	29–15	Centre		22 Aug 1998	Ellis Park, Johannesburg
26.	Wales	28–20	Centre		14 Nov 1998	Wembley, London
27.	Scotland	35–10	Centre	1	21 Nov 1998	Murrayfield, Edinburgh
28.	Ireland	27–13	Centre		28 Nov 1998	Lansdowne Road, Dublin
29.	England	7–13	Centre		5 Dec 1998	Twickenham, London
30.	New Zealand	18–34	Centre	1	7 Aug 1999	Loftus Versfeld, Pretoria
31.	New Zealand	15–26	Centre		25 Aug 2001	Eden Park, Auckland
32.	France	10–20	Centre		10 Nov 2001	Stade de France, Paris
33.	United States	43–20	Centre		1 Dec 2001	Robertson Stadium, Houston
34.	Wales	34–19	Centre		8 Jun 2002	Free State Stadium, Bloemfontein
35.	Scotland	29–25	Centre		7 Jun 2003	Kings Park, Durban
36.	New Zealand	16–52	Centre		19 Jul 2003	Loftus Versfeld, Pretoria
37.	Scotland	36–16	Wing	1	10 Jun 2006	Kings Park, Durban
38.	Scotland	29–15	Centre		17 Jun 2006	Boet Erasmus Stadium, Port Elizabeth

== Coaching career ==
Snyman moved to the United States in 2011 and helped coach the Glendale Raptors, 2011's D1 club champions. In 2012, Snyman assumed the role of head coach. In 2014, Snyman led Glendale to an 11–1 regular-season record and into the finals of the Pacific Rugby Premiership, where they lost to San Francisco Golden Gate. In 2015, Snyman and the Glendale Raptors won the Pacific Rugby Premiership Championship, beating San Francisco Golden Gate, 25–11, after going 9–3 in regular season. Snyman was named Coach of the Pacific Rugby Premiership by This Is American Rugby for the second year running in 2015. In 2016, Snyman and the Glendale Raptors won the Pacific Rugby Premiership, once again beating San Francisco Golden Gate, 44–20, making them back to back Pacific Rugby Premiership Champions.

Snyman was also used as a defensive specialist for the USA Sevens team under head coach Matt Hawkins.

Snyman formally coached Hill House School where he was the head of rugby and was accompanied by Chris Rose.

== Personal life ==
Snyman with one daughter, Keira has been included in the Junior Springbok Women squad ahead of a two-Test series against the USA Women U20 in Stellenbosch.

== Honours ==
- Powergen Cup/Anglo-Welsh Cup titles: 1
  - 2005

== See also ==
- List of South Africa national rugby union players – Springbok no. 636
