= Mike Shelley =

English rugby union player

- Born: Michael Shelley; 13 March 1972 (age 54) Leeds, England
- Height: 6 ft 2 in (188 cm)
- Weight: 18 st 7 lb (117 kg)

Rugby union career
- Position: Prop
Amateur team(s)
Years	Team	Apps	(Points)
- Medicals RFC
1994–1996	West Hartlepool		
1996–2006	Leeds Tykes	244	
International career
Years	Team	Apps	(Points)
2002	England 'A'		

Mike Shelley (born 13 March 1972 in Leeds) is a former rugby union player who became the longest serving player in the history of Leeds Tykes rugby club, having joined them in 1996 from West Hartlepool. He made his Tykes debut against Otley RUFC on 31 August 1996.

At the end of the 2005–06 season, despite being due a testimonial, he made the decision to retire after 10 years and 244 appearances for the club.

Shelley was made captain for the 2000–01 season, a role he continued until the 2003–04 campaign.

That campaign saw Shelley reach the 200 appearance mark for the Tykes and he enjoyed one of his proudest moments for the club when he lifted the Powergen Cup after their win over Bath Rugby at Twickenham in 2005. Although Iain Balshaw was the official captain on that day, he went off injured early in the game and Shelley took the on-field captaincy.

Shelley started his career at local club side Moortown, leaving them after one season to join West Park Bramhope. He did not become a prop until he went to Newcastle University where he played first for Medicals RFC and the university's 1st XV but a year later he was in Bramhope's 1st XV and two years after that he was playing in the First Division with West Hartlepool.

After two seasons with Wests, Phil Davies persuaded him to step down two divisions to join the new set up at Headingley, where he was given the role of development officer.

Two seasons in the 3rd division and three in the 2nd put his international career on hold for five years or so, but he returned to the England set-up with a return to the Premiership. In 2002 Shelley was called in to the England 'A' side, and again in 2003.

Shelley's form at the end of the 2004–05 season saw him recalled to the England 'A' side, when he joined the team for the Churchill Cup tournament.

Shelley now resides in Calgary, where he is the coach for local rugby team Prairie Wolf Pack.

== Honours ==
- Powergen Cup/Anglo-Welsh Cup titles: 1
  - 2005
