= Leeds Tykes =

English rugby union football club

(England) Leeds Tykes
- Full name: Leeds Tykes Rugby Union Football Club
- Union: Yorkshire RFU
- Founded: 1991; 35 years ago
- Location: Bramhope, West Yorkshire, England
- Ground: The Sycamores (Capacity: 1,500)
- Director of Rugby: Peter Seabourne
- Captain: Adam Brown
- League: National League 1
- 2025–26: 9th
Team kit

Official website
- leeds-tykes.com

Leeds Tykes (formerly Leeds RUFC, Leeds Carnegie and Yorkshire Carnegie) is an English rugby union club in Leeds, West Yorkshire, England, currently playing in National League 1 – a third tier league in the English rugby union system – following their promotion from the 2024–25 National League 2 North.

The club was founded as Headingley FC, but renamed in 1992 when it joined with Roundhay RUFC to form Leeds RUFC. In 1998, the club merged with Leeds Rhinos to form Leeds Rugby Limited, also known as Leeds Tykes. In 2007, Leeds Metropolitan University bought a 51% stake in the club and changed the name to fit with the university's sport department, Carnegie College. At the end of the 2008–09 season, ownership of the club passed back into the hands of Leeds Rugby. They are now called Leeds Tykes.

Leeds have bounced between the Premiership and the second-level National Division One, now known as the RFU Championship; they were either promoted or relegated in four consecutive seasons starting in 2006. Leeds were relegated from the Premiership as bottom finishers in 2006, promoted as National Division One champions in 2007, relegated again from the Premiership in 2008, and promoted a second time as National Division One champions in 2009. They managed to stay in the Premiership in the 2009–10 season, which helped to secure their financial future; from the 2010–11 season, they became a full shareholder in Premier Rugby, the company behind the Premiership. In 2009–10, they only received 60% of a full share of Premiership revenues. Their P shares in Premiership Rugby were sold to Exeter Chiefs in 2012.

== History ==
=== 1877–1900s: Headingley and Roundhay ===
Headingley has a tradition of rugby that started back in 1877, when several youngsters became interested in rugby after watching Leeds St. John's, later to become the Leeds Rhinos rugby league team. Their first game was in November against the Saints second team. Union was centred around a church club. The original rugby union team was Leeds St John's and it played at the Militia Barracks ground before moving to Cardigan Fields. The Headingley name was adopted in 1878 and Cardigan Fields was used for both rugby and cricket. On 5 January 1884, England played Wales there and won 5–3 with a crowd in the region of 2,000 in attendance. The club playing there was then disbanded but was re-formed again in 1885 under the auspices of the Headingley Hill Chapel Sunday Class and played matches on local fields against local teams, including Roundhay.

In 1888, the Cardigan Estate was sold at auction and Lot 17a was purchased by a group of Leeds citizens, who intended to form the city's leading sports club. Lot 17a became what is now Headingley Stadium. Leeds St John's played their final season under that name in 1889–90, before becoming the football section of Leeds Cricket, Football and Athletic Company Ltd the following season. With Headingley still being completed, Leeds' first game was staged at Cardigan Fields, the home side defeating Otley. The first game at Headingley was played on 20 September 1890, when Manningham were beaten by one try and one dropped goal to nil. Leeds were founder members of the Northern Union when it broke away from the Rugby Football Union in 1895. Leeds' début in the Northern Union was a 6–3 victory at Leigh on 7 September 1895, the inaugural day of the new competition.

The development of the playing fields into the Headingley ground was down to Lord Hawke, who was also behind the creation of the Leeds Cricket, Football and Athletic Company and the purchase of lot 17A of the Cardigan Estate. (Lord Hawke captained England and Yorkshire at cricket). However, this saw the demise of the Leeds club which split into two. The part that was to become the Rugby League club in 1895-6 stayed at the Headingley ground and Headingley RUFC was reborn in 1891, eventually finishing up in 1902 in Clarence Fields, Kirkstall. Two other internationals were played in Leeds before the split between Union and League, against Ireland and Scotland, both ending in defeat.

In 1889, Headingley was disbanded when Leeds St. John's moved into the area, built Headingley Rugby Stadium and dropped the St. John's from their name. However, Headingley bounced back and found fixtures outside Yorkshire, in 1901 their fixture list including a game against the famous Blackheath Rugby Club. Roundhay were formed in 1924 and moved to their ground at Chandos Park in the 1930s. Forty internationals have played for one team or the other perhaps the best known being Peter Winterbottom, Ian McGeechan and Chris Rea, who played for Headingley. Former Scotland coach Frank Hadden also had a spell at Headingley, where his and McGeechan's playing paths crossed, at the tail end of his career. Brian Moore played for Roundhay before his move to Nottingham and selection for England.

==== Headingley honours ====
- Langholm Sevens
  - Champions (2): 1968, 1971

Headingley was the first English team to win the Langholm Sevens.

=== 1991–1997: Leeds RUFC ===
Leeds RUFC was founded in 1991 and started playing league rugby union in 1992 following the merger of existing clubs Roundhay and Headingley; Morley RFC was also invited to join but declined. League home games were to be played at Headingley's ground at Clarence Field while friendly fixtures were held at Roundhay's ground - Chandos Park. The new club played their first match on 1 September 1992 against Hull Ionians at in the Courage National League Division Three. The first try was scored by Glynn Thompson, previously of Roundhay. Richard Cardus, Bev Dovey, Denis Wilkins and Keith Smith all won international caps while in the Roundhay ranks. Smith featured in England's first full tour of Australia in 1975, but had to return home injured and Wilkins, who was also in the Royal Navy, won 13 caps, between 1951 and 1953. When they amalgamated in 1992–93, both clubs were in National Division Three.

In the first season in National Three, Leeds finished 6th, but League reorganisation put the club in National Division Four, with finishes of 6th, 6th and 5th in 1995–96. The following season, they finished 3rd, scoring 1,209 points in thirty games, with the former England 'A' outside-half Gerry Ainscough scoring 307 points, and the ex-Scotland 'A' utility back Mark Appleson scoring sixteen tries. In 1997–98, they were promoted from the newly formed Jewson One to Premiership Two, finishing runners-up to Worcester. The Tongan Sateki Tuipulotu scored a then club record 322 points.

=== 1998–2006: Leeds Tykes ===
In 1998, the club amalgamated with Leeds Rhinos to form Leeds Rugby Limited. Leeds RUFC took on a new name when they entered the 1998 Premiership Two competition, Leeds Tykes.

The Tykes finished 6th in their first season in Premiership Two with the Tongan scoring 250 points and Simon Middleton and Jonathan Scales scoring ten tries apiece. Since 1996, the Tykes have played at Leeds Rhinos' Headingley stadium and Phil Davies became their player-coach. In their first season, they finished 8th in a twelve team division. They were promoted to the Premiership in 2001. In gaining promotion Richard Le Bas scored 337 points and Graham Mackay, a product of Leeds Rhinos, scored 19 tries, both club season records still extant.

In 2001, Tom Palmer became the first Leeds Tykes player to be capped for England when he appeared as a replacement against the United States. The Leeds Tykes team for their first game in the Premiership on 2 September 2001 against Bath was Shelley, Holt, Wring, C. Murphy, Palmer, Mather, Ponton, Fea'unati, Benton, Bachop, Emmerson, Woof, Mayer, Scarbrough, Benson. The replacements were Hogg for Mather (74), Davies for Fea'unati (75), Kerr for Fea'unati (26), O'Reilly for Mayer (73), Fea'unati for Kerr (33). Not used were Luffman, Clarke, Le Bas.

The Tykes survived their first season after finishing bottom of the league when the National League 1 champions were denied entry into the Premiership in 2002 (Champions Rotherham Titans were refused promotion to the Zurich Premiership for the 2002–03 season due to facilities failing to meet Premiership criteria). The next season Leeds finished fifth in the table and made their Heineken Cup début in December 2003. In their four seasons in the Zurich Premiership, they finished an average ninth and reached two domestic cup semi-finals.

In 2005, they were mid-table by early November, but at the turn of the year, following injuries to key players, they were bottom of the Zurich Premiership and some way adrift of their rivals. Despite the threat of relegation, they made it to their first Powergen Cup final. They faced Bath who were top of the table and had never been beaten in a cup final, winning 20–12 to claim their first trophy.

Following the cup win, they won five straight games and avoided the drop by finishing eighth. Phil Davies relinquished control of some coaching duties to concentrate on his role as Director of Rugby in 2005 following another poor start to the season which saw the Tykes lose their first eight games in three different competitions.

After losing three successive away matches in injury time to Northampton Saints, Sale Sharks and Leicester Tigers, in January 2006 former Rugby League international Daryl Powell was promoted from the back room staff to First Team coach. Leeds were finally relegated after Newcastle Falcons beat Sale Sharks. Following relegation, Marshall was transfer listed by request and Mike Shelley announced his retirement. Other players who left were: Iain Balshaw, Chris Bell, Gordon Bulloch, Danny Care, Andy Craig, David Doherty, Dan Hyde, Mark McMillan, Tom Palmer, Richard Parks, Roland Reid, Gordon Ross, David Rees, Roland De Marigny, Scott Morgan, Chris Murphy and Nathan Thomas. Players who remained at club were: Tom Biggs, Lee Blackett, Michael Cusack, Jon Dunbar, Stuart Hooper, James Isaacson, Chris Jones, Rob Rawlinson and Rob Vickerman. At the end of April 2006, Phil Davies resigned as Director of Rugby to be replaced by academy coach Stuart Lancaster.

The new players signed for the new season under Lancaster were Leigh Hinton from Newport Gwent Dragons, Leinster centre Jonny Hepworth, wing/full-back Richard Welding from Cornish Pirates, scrum-half Jacob Rauluni ex-Earth Titans and Bristol, scrum-half Darren Edwards from London Irish, winger John Holtby from Earth Titans, and centre Anitelia Tuilagi, on loan from Leicester Tigers. New forwards include flanker Mark Lock from Wasps, Argentinian 7s and ex-Plymouth Albion flanker Martín Schusterman, Former Bristol Rugby No 8 Rhys Oakley from Newport Gwent Dragons, hooker James Parkes from Gloucester and props USA international Mike MacDonald, ex-Worcester who helped the Eagles to qualify for the World Cup, and Colin Noon from Biarritz.

=== 2007–2013: Leeds Carnegie RUFC ===
In 2007, the club was renamed as Leeds Carnegie in a deal with Leeds Metropolitan University, which took a 51% stake. Carnegie College is part of the university's sport department. Leeds director of rugby Stuart Lancaster said: "I am delighted by the announcement. This is another hugely significant step in our evolution."

In 2008, Lancaster left Leeds to take a job at the RFU, replaced by England World Cup winner Neil Back, and Andy Key, both of whom were previously on the coaching staff at Leicester Tigers.

In May 2009, Leeds Carnegie announced that it had restructured for the Premiership. Leeds Met University returned its 51% stake in Leeds Carnegie and Leeds Rugby retook full control. The restructuring saw former Wales and British and Irish Lions international Gareth Davies join a new board of directors representing the university.

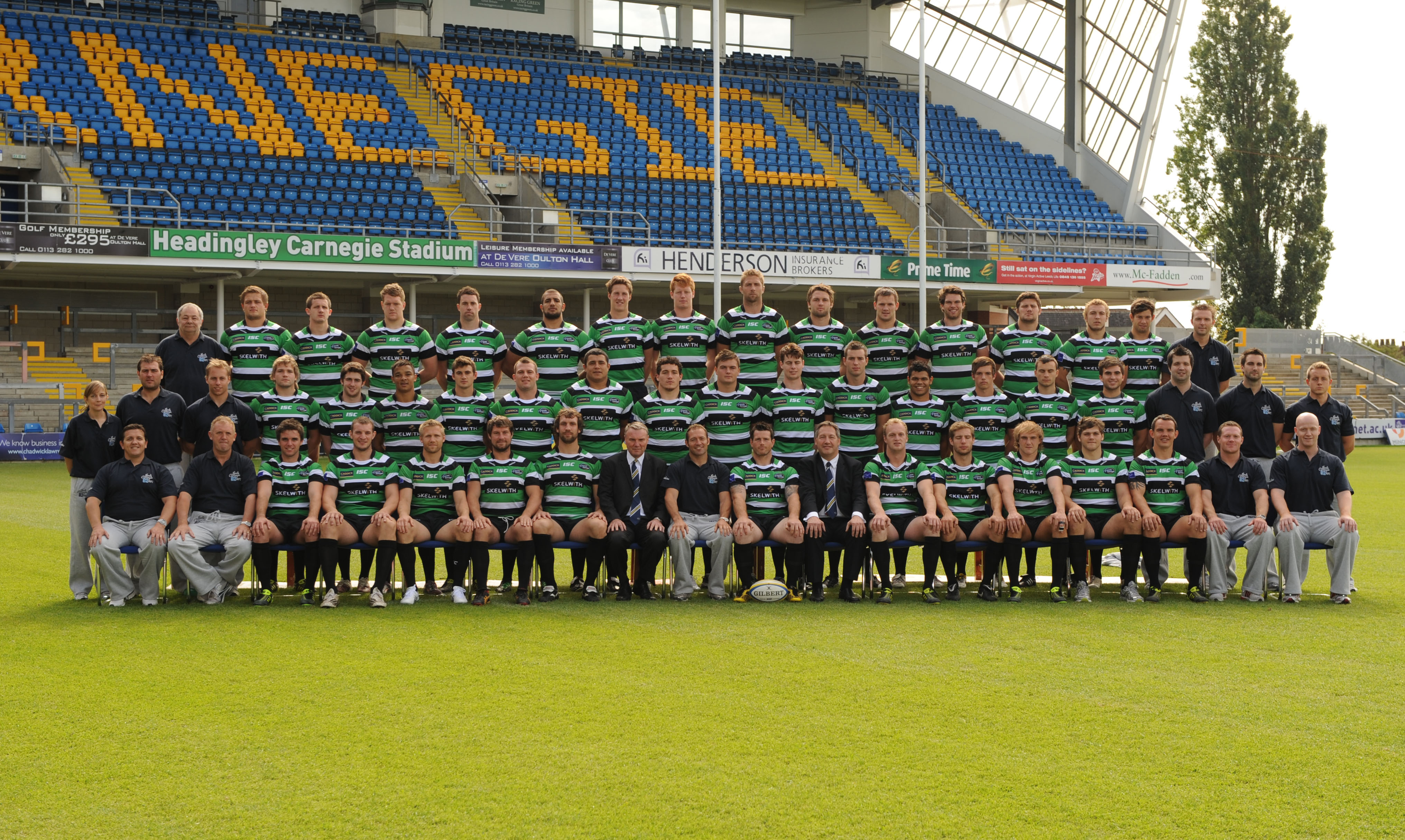
Leeds Carnegie 2011–12

=== 2014–2020: Yorkshire Carnegie ===
In 2014, the club was rebranded as Yorkshire Carnegie. They also struck a two-year sponsorship deal with Satsuma Loans at a reported £300,000 per year. In 2019 they announced that the club had lost key investors and that they were looking for new investments. On 9 April 2019 the players and staff were told that as of the start of the 2019–20 season the club would be returning to part-time status. It was also confirmed the club would rebrand ahead of the 2020–21 season.

=== 2020– present: return to Leeds Tykes ===
In September 2020, it was confirmed that the club had reverted to the Leeds Tykes ahead of the (eventually cancelled) 2020–21 National League 1 season. They will also leave Headingley Stadium and base themselves at The Sycamores, home of West Park Leeds RUFC. However, they intend to still play some games at Headingley.

== Home ground ==
=== The Sycamores ===
The club based itself at The Sycamores, home of West Park Leeds RUFC ahead of the 2021–22 season.

=== Headingley Rugby Stadium ===
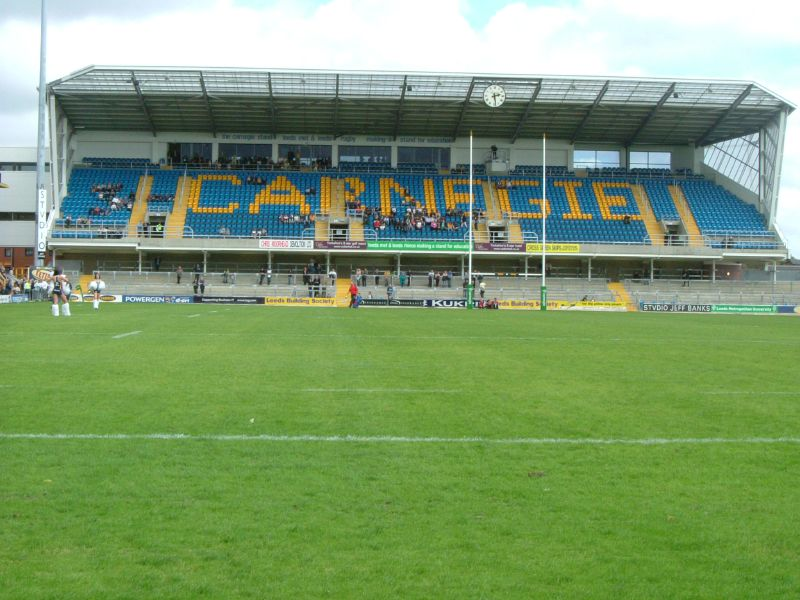
The new Carnegie Stand at the rugby ground.

In July 1998 Leeds RUFC became part of the world's first dual-code rugby partnership, Leeds Rugby Limited and began playing at Headingley Stadium, home of Leeds Rhinos.

Leeds St. Johns, who were later to become Leeds Rugby League Football Club, then Leeds Rhinos, moved to Headingley in 1889 and built Headingley Rugby Stadium. Since then the stadium has staged more than forty rugby league international matches and countless domestic finals. Undersoil heating was installed in 1963, and floodlights in 1966. New changing rooms were added in 1991.

On Saturday 13 August 2005, Headingley hosted back-to-back union and league games. The Tykes played Edinburgh in a friendly followed by a Super League game between the Rhinos and London. 2006 saw the construction of the Carnegie Stand. Built to replace the old eastern terrace, it was opened on 1 September 2006 for the Super League match between Leeds Rhinos and Warrington Wolves. The ground now has a capacity of 22,250.

The record attendance at Headingley Rugby Stadium was 40,175 for the rugby league match between Leeds and Bradford Northern on 21 May 1947. The highest attendance for a Tykes match was against Newcastle Falcons on 27 December 2004, with a crowd of 14,293 at Headingley to see the Falcons take home a 15–11 victory. In 2006 a new sponsorship deal with Leeds Metropolitan University led to Headingley Stadium being renamed Headingley Carnegie Stadium. In November 2017 it again changed its name to Emerald Headingley Stadium, just after a major rebuilding project started to replace both main pitchside stands, completed in 2019.

Leeds Tykes moved out of the ground soon afterwards. It remains the home of the Rhinos.

== Current standings ==
2026–27 National League 1 table
Pos	Team	Pld	W	D	L	PF	PA	PD	TB	LB	Pts	Qualification
1	Plymouth Albion	10	10	0	0	537	168	+369	10	0	50	Promotion place
2	Tonbridge Juddians	10	8	0	2	394	347	+47	10	1	43	Promotion play-off
3	Camborne	10	8	0	2	409	307	+102	9	1	42	Promotion play-off
4	Leeds Tykes	10	7	0	3	369	277	+92	8	3	39	
5	Sale FC	10	7	0	3	427	286	+141	8	2	38	
6	Rosslyn Park	10	6	0	4	374	313	+61	9	1	34	
7	London Scottish	10	5	0	5	373	375	−2	8	2	30	
8	Bishop's Stortford	10	4	0	6	369	395	−26	9	2	27	
9	Birmingham Moseley	10	4	0	6	266	378	−112	6	1	23	
10	Rams	10	3	1	6	264	335	−71	7	2	23	
11	Dings Crusaders	10	2	1	7	362	436	−74	9	3	22	Relegation play-off
12	Bury St Edmunds	10	3	0	7	275	399	−124	7	1	20	Relegation place
13	Sheffield	10	2	0	8	261	381	−120	7	3	18	Relegation place
14	Cambridge	10	0	0	10	262	545	−283	6	3	9	Relegation place

Updated to match(es) played on 7 November 2026. Source: National League Rugby
Rules for classification: If teams are level at any stage, tiebreakers are applied in the following order:
1. Number of matches won
2. Number of matches drawn
3. Difference between points for and against
4. Total number of points for
5. Aggregate number of points scored in matches between tied teams
6. Number of matches won excluding the first match, then the second and so on until the tie is settled

== Notable former players ==
=== British & Irish Lions ===
The following Leeds players have been selected for the Lions tours while at the club:

- John Spencer (1971)
- Ian McGeechan (1974 & 1977)
- Peter Winterbottom (1983)
- Iain Balshaw (2005)

=== Rugby World Cup ===
The following are players which have represented their countries at the Rugby World Cup whilst playing for Leeds:

Tournament	Players selected	England players	Other national team players
1987	1	Peter Winterbottom	
1999	1		Sateki Tu'ipulotu (Tonga)
2003	7	Mark Regan	Diego Albanese (Argentina) , Kees Lensing (Namibia) , Gordon Ross (Scotland) , Alix Popham (Wales) , Aaron Persico (Italy) , Winston Stanley (Canada)
2007	4		Fosi Pala'amo, Anitele'a Tuilagi (Samoa) , Mike MacDonald (United States) , Martín Schusterman (Argentina)
2011	1		Mike MacDonald (United States)

=== Other notable former players ===
The following players have played for Leeds and have 10 or more caps for their national side or other significant accomplishments.

- Sir Carl Aarvold, England Captain and British & Irish Lions captain
- Danny Care, England
- Andy Gomarsall, England
- (England) Simon Middleton, 2021 World Rugby Coach of the Year
- Tom Palmer, England
- Tim Stimpson, England and British & Irish Lions
- Stuart Lancaster, England head coach 2011–2015
- Dan Crowley, Australia
- Wendell Sailor, Australia
- Jacob Rauluni, Fiji
- Seru Rabeni, Fiji
- Simon Easterby, Ireland and British & Irish Lions
- (New Zealand) Stephen Bachop, Samoa and All Black #925
- (New Zealand) Justin Marshall, All Black #948
- Erik Lund, Norway
- Gordon Bulloch, Scotland and British & Irish Lions
- Andy Craig, Scotland
- Duncan Hodge, Scotland
- Gavin Kerr, Scotland
- Tony Stanger, Scotland and British & Irish Lions
- Phil Davies, Wales
- Kevin Sinfield, England and Great Britain
- André Snyman, South Africa
- Braam van Straaten, South Africa

== Personnel ==
Leeds Tykes
Leeds Tykes Squad for the 2025–26 season
=== Hookers === : (England) Ben Bailey; (England) Adam Brown; (England) Jamie Major; (Wales) Max Thatcher; === Prop === : (England) Matt Casselden; (England) Jordan Cordice; (England) Will Dennis; (Poland) Filip Nawrocki; (England) Alex Pleasants; (Wales) Tom Zoogah; === Locks === : (England) George Bolam; (England) Tom Collins; (England) Seth Eley; (England) Jack Hamilton; (England) Alfie Simonds-Gooding	=== Backrows === : (England) Eddie Brown; (England) Mike Ogunwole; (England) Reuben Parsons; (England) Jonny Teague; (England) Louis Townsend; (England) Charlie Vaughan; (England) Connor Walker; (England) Lucas Walsh; === Scrum-halves === : (England) Kit Keith; (England) Ewan Laughton; === Fly-halves === : (England) Eddie Crossland; (Fiji) Seremaia Bai Turagabeci	=== Centres === : (England) Ben Dixon; (England) Kristan Dobson; (England) Matt Salisbury; (England) Charlie Venables; (England) Tom Williams; === Wingers === : (England) Albert Bradshaw; (England) Eliah Chitiyo; (England) Alex Green; (England) Henry Macnab; (England) James Magee; (England) Ollie Williams; (England) George Worthington; === Fullbacks === : (Wales) Kieran Davies; (England) Max Farrell; (England) Austin Keogh; (England) Ben Turpin

=== Coaching and medical staff ===
- Director of Rugby: Pete Seabourne
- Head Coach: Pete Lucock
- Forwards Coach: James Phillips
- Defence Coach: Jack Moran

== Honours ==
- Yorkshire Cup (3):
  - Winners: 1998, 2006, 2009
- National Division One (3):
  - Champions: 2000–01, 2006–07, 2008–09
- Powergen Cup:
  - Champions: 2005
- National League 2 North (1):
- Champions: 2024–25

== Statistics and records ==
From Leedsrugby.com

- League records
- Highest scoring match:
- 104–0 v Manchester 08/04/09
- Largest winning margin:
- 104 v Manchester 08/04/09
- Most points in a match:
- 31 Braam van Straaten v London Irish 08/09/02
- 27 Gerry Ainscough v Rosslyn Park 14/9/96
- Most tries in a match:
- 5 Simon Middleton v Morley 14/2/96
- Most conversions in a match:
- 12 Jason Strange v Manchester 08/04/09
- 9 Gerry Ainscough v Clifton 07/12/96
- 9 Richard Le Bas v Orrell 17/3/01
- Most penalties in a match:
- 9 Braam van Straaten v London Irish 08/08/02
- Most drop goals in a match:
- 3 Joe Ford v Rotherham Titans 25/11/11
- Fastest ever Premiership try:
- 8.26 seconds Lee Blackett v Newcastle Falcons 21/3/08
- Cup records
- Highest scoring cup match:
- 100–0 v Morley 21/10/01
- 96–6 v Redruth 2/11/96
- Most points in a cup match:
- 35 Richard Le Bas v Morley 21/10/01
- Most tries in a cup match:
- 5 Wendell Sailor v Rugby Lions 14/11/98
- Most conversions in a cup match:
- 10 Richard Le Bas v Morley 21/10/01
- Most penalties in a cup match:
- 5 Dan Eddie v Fylde 4/11/96
- Most senior appearances:
- 244 Mike Shelley

== Season summary ==
=== League ===
Season	Pld	W	D	L	F	A	+/-	BP	Pts	Pos	Notes
2021–22 National League 1	28	9	1	18	635	789	−154	21	59	13th	
2019–20 RFU Championship	13 (Note: Season ended prematurely due to the COVID-19 pandemic and final points were awarded on a best playing record formula.)	0	0	13	166	647	−481	2	2.75	12th	Relegated
2018–19 RFU Championship	22	11	0	11	475	549	−74	11	55	6th	
2017–18 RFU Championship	22	12	2	8	518	547	−29	11	63	6th	
2016–17 RFU Championship	20	15	0	5	619	461	158	14	74	2nd	Finalist
2015–16 RFU Championship	22	14	0	8	655	466	189	22	78	3rd	Semi-finalist
2014–15 RFU Championship	22	10	1	11	494	462	32	0	54	6th	
2013–14 RFU Championship	23	18	0	5	700	387	313	0	84	3rd	
2012–13 RFU Championship	22	13	0	9	585	480	105	0	67	4th	
2011–12 RFU Championship	22	13	1	8	470	505	−35	0	60	6th	
2010–11 Aviva Premiership	22	4	0	18	315	590	−275	7	23	12th	Relegated
2009–10 Guinness Premiership	22	7	1	14	283	493	−210	6	36	10th	
2008–09 National Division One	30	28	0	2	1238	376	863	21	133	1st	Promoted
2007–08 Guinness Premiership	22	2	1	19	336	732	−396	2	12	12th	Relegated
2006–07 National Division One	30	24	2	4	960	474	486	23	123	1st	Promoted
2005–06 Guinness Premiership	22	5	0	17	363	573	−210	8	28	12th	Relegated
2004–05 Zurich Premiership	22	9	0	13	380	431	−51	7	43	8th	
2003–04 Zurich Premiership	22	7	1	14	449	588	−139	7	37	11th	
2002–03 Zurich Premiership	22	12	2	8	478	435	43	6	58	5th	
2001–02 Zurich Premiership	22	6	0	16	406	654	−248	4	28	12th	
2000–01 National Division One	26	24	0	2	1,032	407	625	1	116	1st	Promoted
1999–2000 National Division One	26	22	0	4	792	269	523	1	44	2nd	
1998–1999 National Division One	26	16	0	10	713	367	346	1	32	6th	

=== Cups ===
Competition	Pld	W	D	L	F	A	Notes
Powergen Cup	11	5	1	5	297	274	Winners 2005
Heineken Cup	12	5	0	7	209	213	
European Challenge Cup	31	18	2	11	832	601	Quarter-finalists 2007/8
European Shield	6	4	1	1	324	106	Semi-finalists 2004/5
