= Julien Laharrague =

France international rugby union player

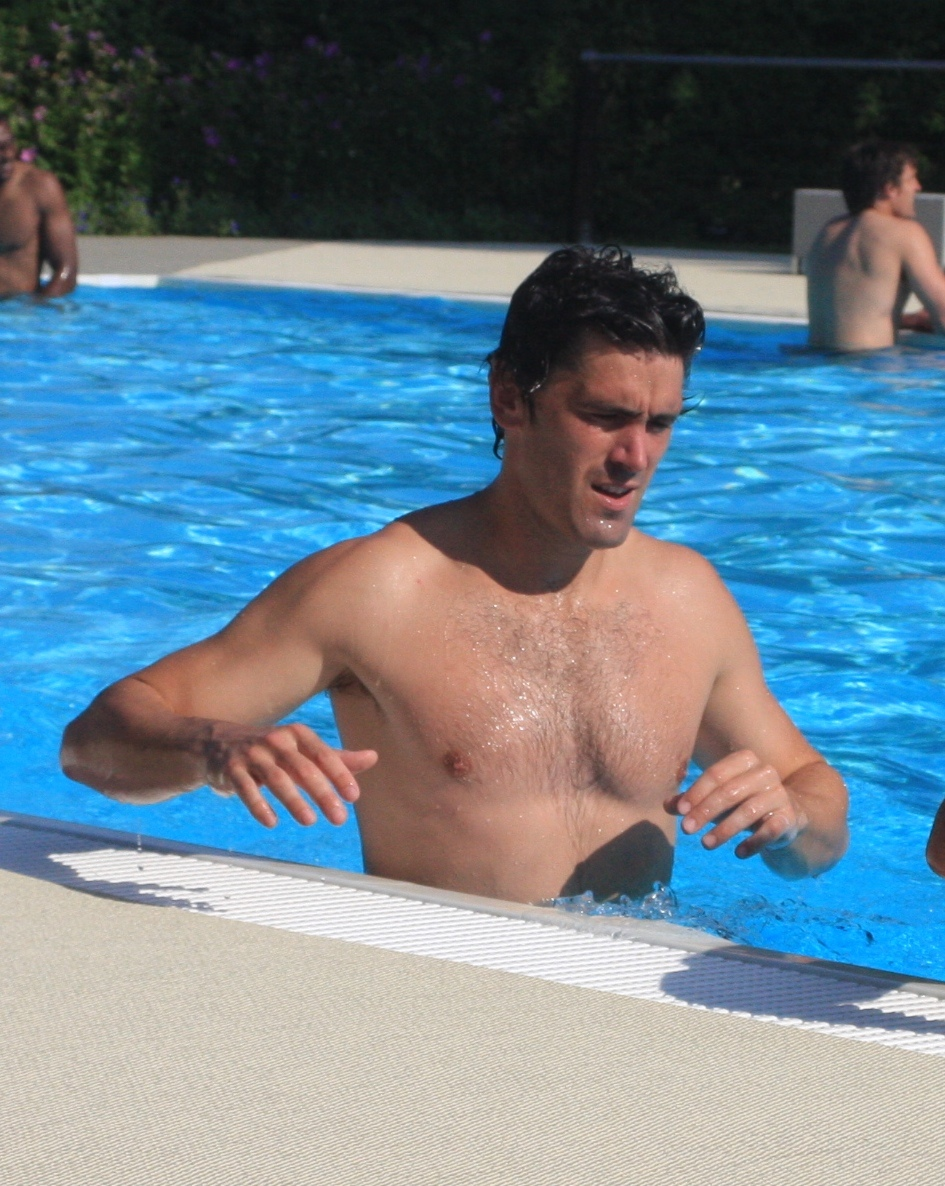
- Born: Julien Laharrague; 29 July 1978 (age 48) Tarbes, France
- Height: 6 ft 2 in (1.88 m)
- Weight: 14 st 6 lb (92 kg)
- Notable relative: Nicolas Laharrague (brother)

Rugby union career
- Position: Full-back / Wing
- Current team: Aironi
Youth career
- Tarbes Pyrénées Rugby
Senior career
Years	Team	Apps	(Points)
1997–1998	Béziers		
1998–1999	Agen		
1999–2001	Dax		
2001–2003	Béziers	34	(39)
2003–2005	Brive	43	(263)
2005–2007	Perpignan	37	(40)
2007–2008	Sale	23	(12)
2008–2010	Montauban	34	(10)
2010–2011	Aironi	17	(8)
2011−2013	Lourdes	25	(7)
International career
Years	Team	Apps	(Points)
2005–2007	France	12	(20)

Julien Laharrague (born 29 July 1978 in Tarbes, France) is a French rugby union footballer, usually playing on the wing or at fullback. He currently plays for Aironi in the Pro12 . Laharrague has also played for France.

Laharrague's first club was Béziers in which he played during the 1997–98 season, after one season with Béziers he signed with SU Agen for the following season. Laharrague then signed with Dax, where he played for the following two seasons. He returned to his first club, Béziers, and played his rugby with them for two seasons, before signing with Brive, where he played for two seasons. He then signed with USAP for the 2005–06 season.

Laharrague made his international début in a match during the 2005 Six Nations Championship, in a match against Wales on 26 February. He played in the subsequent matches against Ireland in Dublin and Italy in Rome. He made another five appearances for France that year, playing in test matches against the Springboks, Australia, Canada and Tonga. He did not play in the 2006 Six Nations Championship, but was selected for the mid-year tests against Romania and the Springboks.

On 28 February 2007, he signed a three-month deal with Sale Sharks. After this he moved back to France and on to club US Montauban.

He signed a 2-year contract with Aironi for the 2010/2011 season.
