= Rob Rawlinson =

English rugby union player

- Born: 23 August 1976 (age 50) Littlebourgh, England
- Height: 5 ft 9 in (1.80 m)
- Weight: 15 st 10 lb (100 kg)

Rugby union career
- Position: Hooker
Senior career
Years	Team	Apps	(Points)
1999–2010	Leeds Carnegie		

Rob Rawlinson (born 23 August 1976) is a retired professional rugby union player, who played as a hooker. During his time at Leeds he helped them win the 2004–05 Powergen Cup, for the final of which he was a replacement. He retired in 2010 due to a neck injury.

As of 2010 he coaches rugby for Queen Ethelburga's College, England, York.

== Honours ==
- Powergen Cup/Anglo-Welsh Cup titles: 1
  - 2005
