= Nicolas Laharrague =

French rugby union player (born 1981)

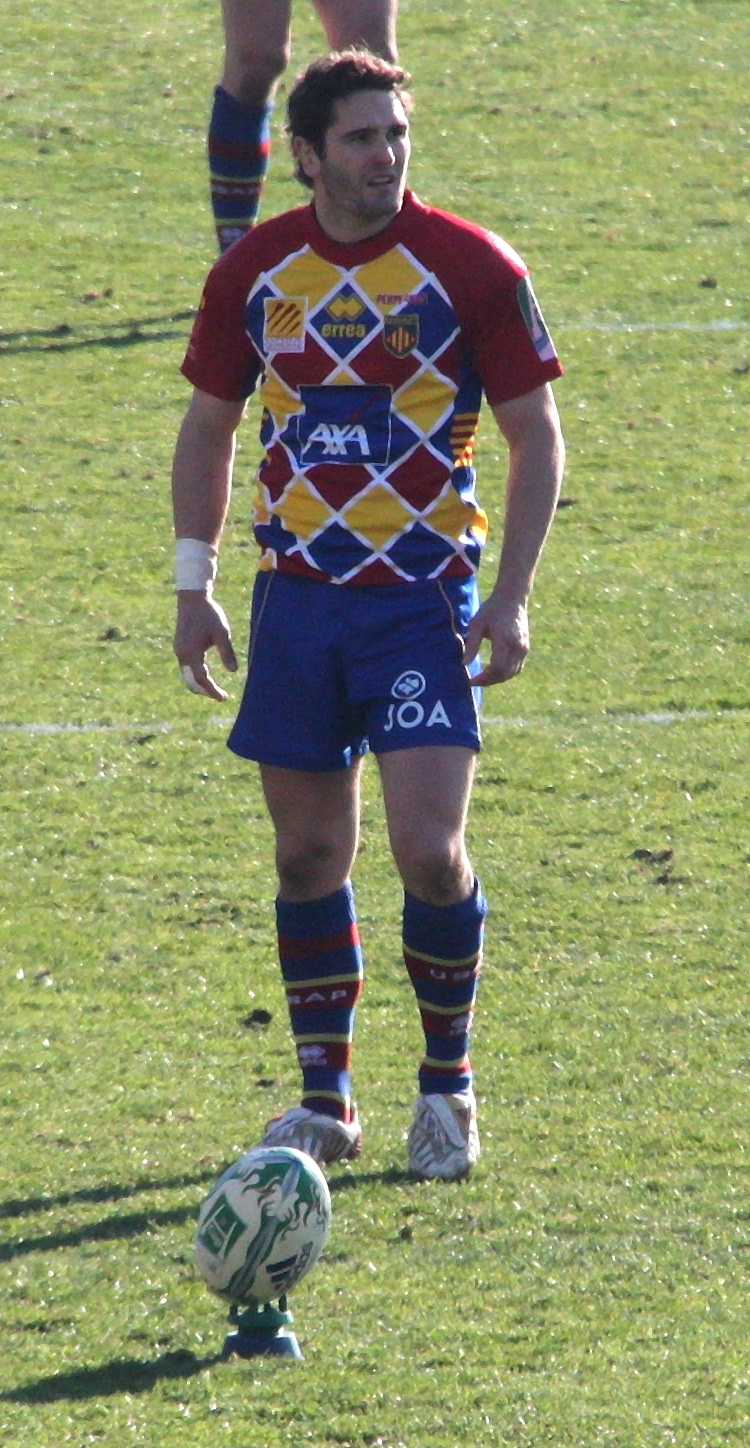
- Born: 30 October 1981 (age 45) Tarbes, France
- Height: 1.79 m (5 ft 10 in)
- Weight: 82 kg (12 st 13 lb)
- Notable relative: Julien Laharrague (brother)

Rugby union career
- Position(s): Centre, fly-half
Senior career
Years	Team	Apps	(Points)
2000	Tarbes Pyrenees		
2000-2002	US Dax		
2002-2012	USA Perpignan		
2012-	FC Grenoble		
- Correct as of 2007-05-29
International career
Years	Team	Apps	(Points)
2005	France A		
2007	France	2	(0)
- Correct as of 2007-06-12

Nicolas Laharrague (born 30 October 1981 in Tarbes, France) is a French rugby union footballer. Laharrague's main position is centre and fly-half where he plays for FC Grenoble in France's Top 14. Born in Tarbes, Laharrague played in several age group representative sides for France, including Under 19, Under 20, and Under 21. He first played professionally for Tarbes Pyrenees in the Pro D2 in 2000, before moving to US Dax. He stayed at US Dax before joining his current club, USA Perpignan in 2002. With USA Perpignan he has played in the Heineken Cup, and in 2003 lost to Toulouse in the 2002-03 Heineken Cup Final. He also played in the Top 16 (as it was then) final in 2004 where they lost to Stade Français. Laharrague first played top class representative rugby when he played for France A in 2005. He was then selected for France in their 2007 Tour to New Zealand. He made his debut for France against the All Blacks on 2 June 2007 in Auckland.
