= 2009 Six Nations Championship squads =

Rugby union competition squads

This is a list of the complete squads for the 2009 Six Nations Championship, an annual rugby union tournament contested by the national rugby teams of England, France, Ireland, Italy, Scotland, and Wales. Each country was entitled to name a squad of 39 players to contest the championship. They could also invite additional players along prior to the start of the championship while the coach could call up replacement players if squad members suffered serious injury.

All caps are as of the start of the tournament, and do not include appearances made during the competition.

== England ==
England announced their 32-man squad for the 2009 Six Nations on 14 January 2009, including both Tom Palmer, who missed the entire tournament with a shoulder injury, and Tom Rees, who was ruled out of the first three games with knee trouble. Prop Matt Stevens was replaced in the squad by Julian White after Stevens was found to have taken a banned substance. Flanker Lewis Moody broke his ankle while training with his club, Leicester Tigers, and was replaced in the England squad by Steffon Armitage, brother of fullback Delon Armitage. Andy Goode, Joe Worsley and Paul Hodgson were all called up to train with the squad and went on to take part in the tournament, while Louis Deacon and Olly Barkley replaced the injured Tom Palmer and Shane Geraghty.

Head coach: Martin Johnson

Note: Flags indicate national union for the club/province as defined by World Rugby.

Player	Position	Date of birth (age)	Caps	Club/province
George Chuter	Hooker	9 July 1976 (aged 32)	21	(England) Leicester Tigers
Dylan Hartley	Hooker	24 March 1986 (aged 22)	4	(England) Northampton Saints
Lee Mears	Hooker	5 March 1979 (aged 29)	29	(England) Bath
Tim Payne	Prop	29 April 1979 (aged 29)	10	(England) London Wasps
Andrew Sheridan	Prop	1 November 1979 (aged 29)	27	(England) Sale Sharks
Phil Vickery	Prop	14 March 1976 (aged 32)	68	(England) London Wasps
Julian White	Prop	14 May 1973 (aged 35)	44	(England) Leicester Tigers
Steve Borthwick (c)	Lock	12 October 1979 (aged 29)	43	(England) Saracens
Louis Deacon	Lock	7 October 1980 (aged 28)	8	(England) Leicester Tigers
Nick Kennedy	Lock	19 August 1981 (aged 27)	1	(England) London Irish
Simon Shaw	Lock	1 September 1973 (aged 35)	50	(England) London Wasps
Steffon Armitage	Flanker	20 September 1985 (aged 23)	0	(England) London Irish
Tom Croft	Flanker	7 November 1985 (aged 23)	8	(England) Leicester Tigers
James Haskell	Flanker	2 April 1985 (aged 23)	12	(England) London Wasps
Tom Rees	Flanker	11 September 1984 (aged 24)	15	(England) London Wasps
Joe Worsley	Flanker	14 June 1977 (aged 31)	69	(England) London Wasps
Nick Easter	Number 8	15 August 1978 (aged 30)	20	(England) Harlequins
Luke Narraway	Number 8	7 September 1983 (aged 25)	5	(England) Gloucester
Danny Care	Scrum-half	2 January 1987 (aged 22)	6	(England) Harlequins
Harry Ellis	Scrum-half	17 May 1982 (aged 26)	22	(England) Leicester Tigers
Ben Foden	Scrum-half	22 July 1985 (aged 23)	0	(England) Northampton Saints
Paul Hodgson	Scrum-half	25 April 1982 (aged 26)	1	(England) London Irish
Danny Cipriani	Fly-half	2 November 1987 (aged 21)	7	(England) London Wasps
Toby Flood	Fly-half	8 August 1985 (aged 23)	22	(England) Leicester Tigers
Andy Goode	Fly-half	3 April 1980 (aged 28)	9	(France) Brive
Olly Barkley	Centre	28 November 1981 (aged 27)	23	(England) Gloucester
Riki Flutey	Centre	10 February 1980 (aged 28)	4	(England) London Wasps
Shane Geraghty	Centre	12 August 1986 (aged 22)	2	(England) London Irish
Jamie Noon	Centre	9 May 1979 (aged 29)	37	(England) Newcastle Falcons
Mathew Tait	Centre	6 February 1986 (aged 23)	24	(England) Sale Sharks
Mike Tindall	Centre	18 October 1978 (aged 30)	56	(England) Gloucester
Mark Cueto	Wing	26 December 1979 (aged 29)	24	(England) Sale Sharks
Ugo Monye	Wing	13 April 1983 (aged 25)	4	(England) Harlequins
Paul Sackey	Wing	8 November 1979 (aged 29)	19	(England) London Wasps
Delon Armitage	Fullback	15 December 1983 (aged 25)	4	(England) London Irish
Olly Morgan	Fullback	3 November 1985 (aged 23)	2	(England) Gloucester

== France ==
France named their final 23-man squad for the Six Nations on 28 January. Eight players from their training squad lost their places in the final 23, with only Biarritz number 8 Imanol Harinordoquy being brought in from outside the original 30.

As cover for prop Lionel Faure, who was nursing an injured calf, Clermont Auvergne's Thomas Domingo was called up to the squad on 11 February. Maxime Mermoz was called up in place of the banned Florian Fritz. Renaud Boyoud was also drafted in place of the injured Benoît Lecouls. Mathieu Bastareaud was called up for the injured Lionel Beauxis with Benoît Baby moving to fly-half, while Sylvain Marconnet was brought into the squad after injuries to both Benoît Lecouls and Nicolas Mas. François Trinh-Duc was also called up as specialist fly-half cover. On 4 March Jérôme Thion, Julien Bonnaire and Damien Traille were all added to the squad, while Sébastien Chabal shifted from lock to the back row. For their final game against Italy, France called up William Servat and Frédéric Michalak to replace Benjamin Kayser who had a neck injury and Sébastien Tillous-Borde who withdrew with a biceps problem.

Head coach: Marc Lièvremont

Note: Flags indicate national union for the club/province as defined by World Rugby.

Player	Position	Date of birth (age)	Caps	Club/province
Benjamin Kayser	Hooker	26 July 1984 (aged 24)	5	(England) Leicester Tigers
William Servat	Hooker	9 December 1978 (aged 30)	20	(France) Toulouse
Dimitri Szarzewski	Hooker	26 January 1983 (aged 26)	30	(France) Stade Français
Fabien Barcella	Prop	27 October 1983 (aged 25)	3	(France) Biarritz
Renaud Boyoud	Prop	7 May 1980 (aged 28)	2	(France) Dax
Thomas Domingo	Prop	20 August 1985 (aged 23)	0	(France) Clermont
Lionel Faure	Prop	26 November 1977 (aged 31)	6	(England) Sale Sharks
Benoît Lecouls	Prop	22 March 1978 (aged 30)	5	(France) Toulouse
Sylvain Marconnet	Prop	8 April 1976 (aged 32)	71	(France) Stade Français
Nicolas Mas	Prop	25 May 1980 (aged 28)	22	(France) Perpignan
Sébastien Chabal	Lock	8 December 1977 (aged 31)	42	(England) Sale Sharks
Romain Millo-Chluski	Lock	20 April 1983 (aged 25)	4	(France) Toulouse
Lionel Nallet (c)	Lock	14 September 1976 (aged 32)	42	(France) Castres
Jérôme Thion	Lock	2 December 1977 (aged 31)	42	(France) Biarritz
Julien Bonnaire	Flanker	20 September 1978 (aged 30)	37	(France) Clermont
Thierry Dusautoir	Flanker	18 November 1981 (aged 27)	17	(France) Toulouse
Fulgence Ouedraogo	Flanker	21 July 1986 (aged 22)	11	(France) Montpellier
Imanol Harinordoquy	Number 8	20 February 1980 (aged 28)	50	(France) Biarritz
Louis Picamoles	Number 8	5 February 1986 (aged 23)	8	(France) Montpellier
Frédéric Michalak	Scrum-half	16 October 1982 (aged 26)	50	(France) Toulouse
Morgan Parra	Scrum-half	15 November 1988 (aged 20)	4	(France) Bourgoin
Sébastien Tillous-Borde	Scrum-half	29 April 1985 (aged 23)	4	(France) Castres
Lionel Beauxis	Fly-half	24 October 1985 (aged 23)	12	(France) Stade Français
François Trinh-Duc	Fly-half	11 November 1986 (aged 22)	7	(France) Montpellier
Benoît Baby	Centre	7 September 1983 (aged 25)	6	(France) Clermont
Mathieu Bastareaud	Centre	17 July 1988 (aged 20)	0	(France) Stade Français
Florian Fritz	Centre	17 January 1984 (aged 25)	13	(France) Toulouse
Yannick Jauzion	Centre	28 July 1978 (aged 30)	55	(France) Toulouse
Maxime Mermoz	Centre	28 July 1986 (aged 22)	1	(France) Perpignan
Cédric Heymans	Wing	20 July 1978 (aged 30)	44	(France) Toulouse
Julien Malzieu	Wing	4 May 1983 (aged 25)	6	(France) Clermont
Maxime Médard	Wing	16 November 1986 (aged 22)	3	(France) Toulouse
Clément Poitrenaud	Fullback	20 May 1982 (aged 26)	31	(France) Toulouse
Damien Traille	Fullback	12 June 1979 (aged 29)	57	(France) Biarritz

== Ireland ==
Ireland named their squad for the 2009 Six Nations on 21 January 2009. Included in the 39-man squad were seven uncapped players, as well as inside centre Gordon D'Arcy, who had only returned in December from a broken arm picked up in the opening game of the 2008 Six Nations.

Head coach: Declan Kidney

Note: Flags indicate national union for the club/province as defined by World Rugby.

Player	Position	Date of birth (age)	Caps	Club/province
Rory Best	Hooker	15 August 1982 (aged 26)	27	(Ireland) Ulster
Jerry Flannery	Hooker	17 October 1978 (aged 30)	26	(Ireland) Munster
Bernard Jackman	Hooker	5 May 1976 (aged 32)	9	(Ireland) Leinster
Tom Court	Prop	6 November 1980 (aged 28)	0	(Ireland) Ulster
John Hayes	Prop	2 November 1973 (aged 35)	89	(Ireland) Munster
Cian Healy	Prop	7 October 1987 (aged 21)	0	(Ireland) Leinster
Marcus Horan	Prop	7 September 1977 (aged 31)	61	(Ireland) Munster
Mike Ross	Prop	21 December 1979 (aged 29)	0	(England) Harlequins
Ryan Caldwell	Lock	1 September 1984 (aged 24)	0	(Ireland) Ulster
Bob Casey	Lock	18 July 1979 (aged 29)	5	(England) London Irish
Donncha O'Callaghan	Lock	23 March 1979 (aged 29)	50	(Ireland) Munster
Paul O'Connell	Lock	20 October 1979 (aged 29)	57	(Ireland) Munster
Mick O'Driscoll	Lock	8 October 1978 (aged 30)	15	(Ireland) Munster
Malcolm O'Kelly	Lock	19 July 1974 (aged 34)	91	(Ireland) Leinster
Donnacha Ryan	Lock	11 December 1983 (aged 25)	1	(Ireland) Munster
Stephen Ferris	Flanker	2 August 1985 (aged 23)	8	(Ireland) Ulster
Shane Jennings	Flanker	8 July 1981 (aged 27)	5	(Ireland) Leinster
Alan Quinlan	Flanker	13 July 1974 (aged 34)	27	(Ireland) Munster
David Wallace	Flanker	8 July 1976 (aged 32)	50	(Ireland) Munster
Jamie Heaslip	Number 8	3 December 1983 (aged 25)	13	(Ireland) Leinster
Denis Leamy	Number 8	27 November 1981 (aged 27)	34	(Ireland) Munster
Tomás O'Leary	Scrum-half	22 October 1983 (aged 25)	3	(Ireland) Munster
Eoin Reddan	Scrum-half	20 November 1980 (aged 28)	14	(England) London Wasps
Peter Stringer	Scrum-half	13 December 1977 (aged 31)	85	(Ireland) Munster
Ronan O'Gara	Fly-half	7 March 1977 (aged 31)	87	(Ireland) Munster
Johnny Sexton	Fly-half	11 July 1985 (aged 23)	0	(Ireland) Leinster
Darren Cave	Centre	5 April 1987 (aged 21)	0	(Ireland) Ulster
Gordon D'Arcy	Centre	10 February 1980 (aged 28)	37	(Ireland) Leinster
Keith Earls	Centre	2 October 1987 (aged 21)	2	(Ireland) Munster
Brian O'Driscoll (c)	Centre	21 January 1979 (aged 30)	88	(Ireland) Leinster
Paddy Wallace	Centre	27 August 1979 (aged 29)	12	(Ireland) Ulster
Tommy Bowe	Wing	22 February 1984 (aged 24)	18	(Wales) Ospreys
Ian Dowling	Wing	5 October 1982 (aged 26)	0	(Ireland) Munster
Luke Fitzgerald	Wing	13 September 1987 (aged 21)	7	(Ireland) Leinster
Shane Horgan	Wing	18 July 1978 (aged 30)	64	(Ireland) Leinster
Andrew Trimble	Wing	20 October 1984 (aged 24)	24	(Ireland) Ulster
Girvan Dempsey	Fullback	2 October 1975 (aged 33)	82	(Ireland) Leinster
Rob Kearney	Fullback	26 March 1986 (aged 22)	11	(Ireland) Leinster
Geordan Murphy	Fullback	19 April 1978 (aged 30)	59	(England) Leicester Tigers

== Italy ==
Italy's squad for the Six Nations, named on 29 January 2009 by Nick Mallett:

Italy lost both of their specialist scrum-halves, Simon Picone and Pietro Travagli, for the entire Six Nations due to injury. Pablo Canavosio was called up but failed to recover from a knee injury in time for Italy's opener. This led head coach Nick Mallett to make a move he had been contemplating even before Canavosio's withdrawal – shifting Mauro Bergamasco from flanker to scrum-half.

After Bergamasco's poor performance at scrum-half in the opener against England, in which his mistakes directly led to three of England's five tries, Mallett recalled Paul Griffen to play scrum-half and moved Bergamasco back to his normal flanker position. Carlo Del Fava was also brought in as an experienced second row forward. Leonardo Ghiraldini was called up after he recovered from injury but Fabio Ongaro was ruled out, so Franco Sbaraglini was also called up. On 3 March, Mallett added several players to the squad. Coming in were Fabio Staibano, Simone Favaro, Kris Burton and Michele Sepe. After returning from his suspension Andrea Masi picked up a back injury, Luciano Orquera was brought into the squad as cover.

Head coach: Nick Mallett

Note: Flags indicate national union for the club/province as defined by World Rugby.

Player	Position	Date of birth (age)	Caps	Club/province
Carlo Festuccia	Hooker	20 June 1980 (aged 28)	45	(France) Racing Métro
Leonardo Ghiraldini	Hooker	26 December 1984 (aged 24)	16	(Italy) Calvisano
Fabio Ongaro	Hooker	23 September 1977 (aged 31)	59	(England) Saracens
Franco Sbaraglini	Hooker	3 December 1982 (aged 26)	0	(Italy) Treviso
Martin Castrogiovanni	Prop	21 October 1981 (aged 27)	54	(England) Leicester Tigers
Carlos Nieto	Prop	25 June 1976 (aged 32)	31	(England) Gloucester
Salvatore Perugini	Prop	6 March 1978 (aged 30)	55	(France) Toulouse
Ignacio Fernández Rouyet	Prop	22 October 1978 (aged 30)	2	(Italy) Viadana
Fabio Staibano	Prop	20 April 1983 (aged 25)	6	(France) Castres
Marco Bortolami	Lock	12 June 1980 (aged 28)	70	(England) Gloucester
Carlo Del Fava	Lock	1 July 1981 (aged 27)	33	(Ireland) Ulster
Santiago Dellapè	Lock	9 May 1978 (aged 30)	52	(France) Toulon
Jean-François Montauriol	Lock	21 March 1983 (aged 25)	0	(Italy) Venezia Mestre
Tommaso Reato	Lock	12 May 1984 (aged 24)	6	(Italy) Rovigo
Mauro Bergamasco	Flanker	1 May 1979 (aged 29)	69	(France) Stade Français
Simone Favaro	Flanker	7 November 1988 (aged 20)	0	(Italy) Rovigo
Josh Sole	Flanker	15 February 1980 (aged 28)	33	(Italy) Viadana
Alessandro Zanni	Flanker	31 January 1984 (aged 25)	26	(Italy) Calvisano
Sergio Parisse (c)	Number 8	13 September 1983 (aged 25)	57	(France) Stade Français
Pablo Canavosio	Scrum-half	26 December 1981 (aged 27)	22	(Italy) Viadana
Paul Griffen	Scrum-half	26 September 1982 (aged 26)	38	(Italy) Calvisano
Giulio Toniolatti	Scrum-half	15 January 1984 (aged 25)	1	(Italy) Capitolina Rome
Kris Burton	Fly-half	4 August 1980 (aged 28)	2	(Italy) Prato
Luke McLean	Fly-half	29 June 1987 (aged 21)	3	(Italy) Calvisano
Luciano Orquera	Fly-half	12 October 1981 (aged 27)	12	(France) Brive
Mirco Bergamasco	Centre	23 February 1983 (aged 25)	56	(France) Stade Français
Gonzalo Canale	Centre	11 November 1982 (aged 26)	42	(France) Clermont
Gonzalo García	Centre	18 February 1984 (aged 24)	5	(Italy) Calvisano
Gilberto Pavan	Centre	13 October 1986 (aged 22)	0	(Italy) Overmach Parma
Roberto Quartaroli	Centre	29 March 1988 (aged 20)	0	(Italy) Overmach Parma
Andrea Bacchetti	Wing	4 July 1988 (aged 20)	0	(Italy) Rovigo
Matteo Pratichetti	Wing	27 July 1985 (aged 23)	12	(Italy) Calvisano
Kaine Robertson	Wing	29 October 1980 (aged 28)	35	(Italy) Viadana
Giulio Rubini	Wing	22 April 1987 (aged 21)	0	(Italy) Overmach Parma
Michele Sepe	Wing	8 October 1986 (aged 22)	2	(Italy) Capitolina Rome
Andrea Marcato	Fullback	13 April 1983 (aged 25)	12	(Italy) Treviso
Andrea Masi	Fullback	30 March 1981 (aged 27)	44	(France) Biarritz

== Scotland ==
Scotland named a 33-man squad for the 2009 Six Nations on 20 January 2009, and included uncapped prop Geoff Cross and fly-half Ruaridh Jackson. However, after injuries and illness hit the squad, a further five players were added to train on 30 January. After injuries to Geoff Cross and the Allan Jacobsen, Moray Low was called into the main squad to provide cover for the final two games. Following a return to fitness Rory Lamont was called up to the squad, but the game against Ireland came to soon for him.

Head coach: Frank Hadden

Note: Flags indicate national union for the club/province as defined by World Rugby.

Player	Position	Date of birth (age)	Caps	Club/province
Ross Ford	Hooker	23 April 1984 (aged 24)	25	(Scotland) Edinburgh
Dougie Hall	Hooker	24 September 1980 (aged 28)	23	(Scotland) Glasgow
Geoff Cross	Prop	11 December 1982 (aged 26)	0	(Scotland) Edinburgh
Alasdair Dickinson	Prop	11 September 1983 (aged 25)	8	(England) Gloucester
Allan Jacobsen	Prop	22 September 1978 (aged 30)	29	(Scotland) Edinburgh
Moray Low	Prop	28 November 1984 (aged 24)	0	(Scotland) Glasgow
Euan Murray	Prop	7 August 1980 (aged 28)	25	(England) Northampton Saints
Craig Hamilton	Lock	1 September 1979 (aged 29)	5	(Scotland) Edinburgh
Jim Hamilton	Lock	17 November 1982 (aged 26)	19	(Scotland) Edinburgh
Nathan Hines	Lock	29 November 1976 (aged 32)	56	(France) Perpignan
Alastair Kellock	Lock	14 June 1981 (aged 27)	14	(Scotland) Glasgow
Jason White	Lock	17 April 1978 (aged 30)	67	(England) Sale Sharks
John Barclay	Flanker	24 September 1986 (aged 22)	4	(Scotland) Glasgow
Kelly Brown	Flanker	8 June 1982 (aged 26)	26	(Scotland) Glasgow
Scott Gray	Flanker	25 February 1978 (aged 30)	1	(England) Northampton Saints
Alasdair Strokosch	Flanker	21 February 1983 (aged 25)	7	(England) Gloucester
Ally Hogg	Number 8	20 July 1983 (aged 25)	47	(Scotland) Edinburgh
Simon Taylor	Number 8	17 August 1979 (aged 29)	60	(France) Stade Français
Mike Blair (c)	Scrum-half	20 April 1981 (aged 27)	53	(Scotland) Edinburgh
Chris Cusiter	Scrum-half	13 June 1982 (aged 26)	39	(France) Perpignan
Rory Lawson	Scrum-half	12 March 1981 (aged 27)	10	(England) Gloucester
Phil Godman	Fly-half	20 May 1982 (aged 26)	9	(Scotland) Edinburgh
Ruaridh Jackson	Fly-half	12 February 1988 (aged 20)	0	(Scotland) Glasgow
Dan Parks	Fly-half	26 May 1978 (aged 30)	47	(Scotland) Glasgow
Ben Cairns	Centre	29 October 1985 (aged 23)	5	(Scotland) Edinburgh
Nick De Luca	Centre	1 February 1984 (aged 25)	7	(Scotland) Edinburgh
Max Evans	Centre	12 September 1983 (aged 25)	1	(Scotland) Glasgow
Graeme Morrison	Centre	17 October 1982 (aged 26)	9	(Scotland) Glasgow
Simon Danielli	Wing	8 September 1979 (aged 29)	16	(Ireland) Ulster
Thom Evans	Wing	2 April 1985 (aged 23)	3	(Scotland) Glasgow
Sean Lamont	Wing	15 January 1981 (aged 28)	35	(England) Northampton Saints
Simon Webster	Wing	8 March 1981 (aged 27)	36	(Scotland) Edinburgh
Rory Lamont	Fullback	10 October 1982 (aged 26)	19	(England) Sale Sharks
Chris Paterson	Fullback	30 March 1978 (aged 30)	90	(Scotland) Edinburgh
Hugo Southwell	Fullback	14 May 1980 (aged 28)	44	(Scotland) Edinburgh

== Wales ==
Wales announced their squad for the 2009 Six Nations on 19 January 2009, naming a group of 28 players. Following a knee injury to scrum-half Gareth Cooper in training, head coach Warren Gatland opted to call 64-cap Sale Sharks scrum-half Dwayne Peel into the squad. After Dwayne Peel had also been ruled out with injury, Gatland was forced to call up London Irish scrum-half Warren Fury for bench cover.

Head coach: Warren Gatland

Note: Flags indicate national union for the club/province as defined by World Rugby.

Player	Position	Date of birth (age)	Caps	Club/province
Huw Bennett	Hooker	11 June 1983 (aged 25)	18	(Wales) Ospreys
Matthew Rees	Hooker	9 December 1980 (aged 28)	25	(Wales) Scarlets
Gethin Jenkins	Prop	17 November 1980 (aged 28)	63	(Wales) Cardiff Blues
Adam Jones	Prop	8 March 1981 (aged 27)	52	(Wales) Ospreys
Rhys Thomas	Prop	31 July 1982 (aged 26)	6	(Wales) Newport Gwent Dragons
John Yapp	Prop	9 April 1983 (aged 25)	10	(Wales) Cardiff Blues
Luke Charteris	Lock	9 March 1983 (aged 25)	6	(Wales) Newport Gwent Dragons
Bradley Davies	Lock	9 January 1987 (aged 22)	0	(Wales) Cardiff Blues
Ian Gough	Lock	10 November 1976 (aged 32)	55	(Wales) Ospreys
Alun Wyn Jones	Lock	19 September 1985 (aged 23)	21	(Wales) Ospreys
Dafydd Jones	Flanker	24 June 1979 (aged 29)	34	(Wales) Scarlets
Robin Sowden-Taylor	Flanker	9 June 1982 (aged 26)	6	(Wales) Cardiff Blues
Jonathan Thomas	Flanker	27 December 1982 (aged 26)	46	(Wales) Ospreys
Martyn Williams	Flanker	1 September 1975 (aged 33)	84	(Wales) Cardiff Blues
Ryan Jones (c)	Number 8	13 March 1981 (aged 27)	27	(Wales) Ospreys
Andy Powell	Number 8	23 August 1981 (aged 27)	2	(Wales) Cardiff Blues
Gareth Cooper	Scrum-half	7 May 1979 (aged 29)	40	(England) Gloucester
Warren Fury	Scrum-half	10 December 1985 (aged 23)	2	(England) London Irish
Dwayne Peel	Scrum-half	31 August 1981 (aged 27)	64	(England) Sale Sharks
Mike Phillips	Scrum-half	29 August 1982 (aged 26)	33	(Wales) Ospreys
James Hook	Fly-half	27 June 1985 (aged 23)	30	(Wales) Ospreys
Stephen Jones	Fly-half	8 December 1977 (aged 31)	75	(Wales) Scarlets
Andrew Bishop	Centre	7 August 1985 (aged 23)	3	(Wales) Ospreys
Gavin Henson	Centre	1 February 1982 (aged 27)	28	(Wales) Ospreys
Jamie Roberts	Centre	8 November 1986 (aged 22)	7	(Wales) Cardiff Blues
Tom Shanklin	Centre	24 November 1979 (aged 29)	58	(Wales) Cardiff Blues
Leigh Halfpenny	Wing	22 December 1988 (aged 20)	3	(Wales) Cardiff Blues
Mark Jones	Wing	7 November 1979 (aged 29)	43	(Wales) Scarlets
Shane Williams	Wing	26 February 1977 (aged 31)	61	(Wales) Ospreys
Lee Byrne	Fullback	1 June 1980 (aged 28)	22	(Wales) Ospreys
