= History of rugby union matches between Australia and France =

Australia (Wallabies) and France (Les Bleus) national rugby union teams first played each other in 1928, resulting in a win to Australia. Between 1948 and 1986, Australia and France would tour each other every few years. In 1987 the two teams met at the inaugural Rugby World Cup in Sydney, which France won.

In 1999, the two teams met at the final of the 1999 Rugby World Cup in which Australia would go on to win 35-12.

Since 2004 France have often hosted Australia during the Autumn Internationals, while France periodically toured Australia. Since 2026, the two teams have met in the biennial Nations Championship.

== Summary ==
=== Overview ===
Details	Played	Won by Australia	Won by France	Drawn	Australia points	France points
In Australia	26	19	6	1	679	489
In France	27	9	17	1	489	549
Neutral venue	1	1	0	0	35	12
Overall	54	29	23	2	1,203	1,065

=== Records ===
Note: Date shown in brackets indicates when the record was or last set.

Record	Australia	France
Longest winning streak	6 (6 November 1993 – 17 November 2001)	4 (11 January 1948 – 17 August 1968; 5 November 2022–present)
Largest points for
Home	50 (7 June 2014)	48 (22 November 2025)
Away	59 (27 November 2010)	42 (11 July 2026)
Largest winning margin
Home	30 (5 July 2008)	28 (30 October 1976)
Away	43 (27 November 2010)	16 (11 July 2026)

== Results ==
No.	Date	Venue	Score	Winner	Competition
1	22 January 1928	Stade Yves-du-Manoir, Colombes	8–11	Australia (Note: As the New South Wales Waratahs.)	1927–28 New South Wales tour of Great Britain, Ireland and France
2	11 January 1948	Stade Yves-du-Manoir, Colombes	13–6	France	1947–48 Australia tour of Great Britain, Ireland, France and North America
3	9 March 1958	Stade Yves-du-Manoir, Colombes	19–0	France	1957–58 Australia tour of Great Britain, Ireland and France
4	26 August 1961	Sydney Cricket Ground, Sydney	8–15	France	1961 France tour of New Zealand and Australia
5	11 February 1967	Stade Yves-du-Manoir, Colombes	20–14	France	1966–67 Australia tour of Great Britain, Ireland and France
6	17 August 1968	Sydney Cricket Ground, Sydney	11–10	Australia	1968 France tour of New Zealand and Australia
7	20 November 1971	Stadium Municipal, Toulouse	11–13	Australia	1971 Australia tour of France
8	27 November 1971	Stade Yves-du-Manoir, Colombes	18–9	France	1971 Australia tour of France
9	17 June 1972	Sydney Cricket Ground, Sydney	14–14	draw	1972 France tour of Australia
10	25 June 1972	Ballymore Stadium, Brisbane	15–16	France	1972 France tour of Australia
11	24 October 1976	Stade Chaban-Delmas, Bordeaux	18–15	France	1976 Australia tour of France and Italy
12	30 October 1976	Parc des Princes, Paris	34–6	France	1976 Australia tour of France and Italy
13	5 July 1981	Ballymore Stadium, Brisbane	17–15	Australia	1981 France tour of Australia
14	11 July 1981	Sydney Cricket Ground, Sydney	24–14	Australia	1981 France tour of Australia
15	13 November 1983	Stade Marcel-Michelin, Clermont-Ferrand	15–15	draw	1983 Australia tour of Italy and France
16	19 November 1983	Parc des Princes, Paris	15–6	France	1983 Australia tour of Italy and France
17	21 June 1986	Sydney Cricket Ground, Sydney	27–14	Australia	1986 France tour of Argentina, Australia and New Zealand
18	12 June 1987	Concord Oval, Sydney	24–30	France	1987 Rugby World Cup Semi-final
19	4 November 1989	Stade de la Meinau, Strasbourg	15–32	Australia	1989 Australia tour of France and Canada
20	11 November 1989	Stadium Nord Lille Métropole, Lille	25–19	France	1989 Australia tour of France and Canada
21	9 June 1990	Sydney Football Stadium, Sydney	21–9	Australia	1990 France tour of Australia
22	24 June 1990	Ballymore Stadium Brisbane	48–31	Australia	1990 France tour of Australia
23	30 June 1990	Sydney Football Stadium, Sydney	19–28	France	1990 France tour of Australia
24	30 October 1993	Stade Municipal, Bordeaux	16–13	France	1993 Australia tour of France and North America
25	6 November 1993	Parc des Princes Paris	3–24	Australia	1993 Australia tour of France and North America
26	21 June 1997	Sydney Football Stadium, Sydney	29–15	Australia	1997 France tour of Romania and Australia
27	28 June 1997	Ballymore Stadium Brisbane	26–19	Australia	1997 France tour of Romania and Australia
28	21 November 1998	Stade de France, Saint-Denis	21–32	Australia	1998 Australia tour of France and England
29	6 November 1999	Millennium Stadium, Cardiff (Wales)	35–12	Australia	1999 Rugby World Cup Final
30	4 November 2000	Stade de France, Saint-Denis	13–18	Australia	2000 Australia tour of Great Britain and France
31	17 November 2001	Stade Vélodrome, Marseille	14–13	France	2001 Australia tour of Europe
32	22 June 2002	Docklands Stadium, Melbourne	29–17	Australia	2002 France tour of Argentina and Australia
33	29 June 2002	Stadium Australia, Sydney	31–25	Australia	2002 France tour of Argentina and Australia
34	13 November 2004	Stade de France, Saint-Denis	27–14	France	2004 Autumn Internationals
35	2 July 2005	Lang Park, Brisbane	37–31	Australia	2005 France tour of South Africa and Australia
36	5 November 2005	Stade Vélodrome, Marseille	26–16	France	2005 Autumn Internationals
37	28 June 2008	Stadium Australia, Sydney	34–13	Australia	2008 France tour of Australia
38	5 July 2008	Lang Park, Brisbane	40–10	Australia	2008 France tour of Australia
39	22 November 2008	Stade de France, Saint-Denis	13–18	Australia	2008 Autumn Internationals
40	27 June 2009	Stadium Australia, Sydney	22–6	Australia	2009 Summer Internationals
41	27 November 2010	Stade de France, Saint-Denis	16–59	Australia	2010 Autumn Internationals
42	10 November 2012	Stade de France, Saint-Denis	33–6	France	2012 Autumn Internationals
43	7 June 2014	Lang Park, Brisbane	50–23	Australia	2014 France tour of Australia
44	14 June 2014	Docklands Stadium, Melbourne	6–0	Australia	2014 France tour of Australia
45	21 June 2014	Sydney Football Stadium, Sydney	39–13	Australia	2014 France tour of Australia
46	15 November 2014	Stade de France, Saint-Denis	29–26	France	2014 Autumn Internationals
47	19 November 2016	Stade de France, Saint-Denis	23–25	Australia	2016 Autumn Internationals
48	7 July 2021	Lang Park, Brisbane	23–21	Australia	2021 France tour of Australia
49	13 July 2021	Melbourne Rectangular Stadium, Melbourne	26–28	France	2021 France tour of Australia
50	17 July 2021	Lang Park, Brisbane	33–30	Australia	2021 France tour of Australia
51	5 November 2022	Stade de France, Saint-Denis	30–29	France	2022 Autumn Internationals
52	27 August 2023	Stade de France, Saint-Denis	41–17	France	2023 Rugby World Cup warm-up match
53	22 November 2025	Stade de France, Saint-Denis	48–33	France	2025 Autumn Internationals
54	11 July 2026	Lang Park, Brisbane	26–42	France	2026 Nations Championship

== List of series ==
Played	Won by Australia	Won by France	Drawn
13	7	3	3

Year	Australia	France	Series winner	Trophée des Bicentenaires
1971	1	1	draw	—N/a
1972	0	1	France (Note: The first match of the two-test series was a draw, thus France won the series 1–0.)	—N/a
1976	0	2	France	—N/a
1981	2	0	Australia	—N/a
1983	0	1	France	—N/a
1989	1	1	draw	
1990	2	1	Australia	
1993	1	1	draw	Australia
1997	2	0	Australia	
2002	2	0	Australia	
2008	2	0	Australia	
2014	3	0	Australia	
2021	2	1	Australia	
