= 2007 France rugby union tour of New Zealand =

- Coach: Bernard Laporte
- Tour captain: Pascal Papé
- Top point scorer: Benjamin Boyet (11)
- Top try scorer(s): Jean-François Coux (1); Julien Laharrague (1)
Summary
P	W	D	L
Total
2	0	0	2
Test match
2	0	0	2
Opponent
P	W	D	L
New Zealand
2	0	0	2

Tour chronology
- ← Romania & South Africa 2006 Australia 2008 →

The 2007 France rugby union tour of new Zealand was a series of matches played in June 2007 in new Zealand by France national rugby union team.

The final rounds of the 2006–07 Top 14 season conflicted with the tour, so France sent a Test team short of 30 of their top players. The team was labelled "France C" by the New Zealand media. Featuring 11 new caps, France were defeated 42–11 in the first Test at Eden Park. The second Test was played the following week in Wellington, and the All Blacks achieved their largest ever victory over France with a 61–10 win. The defeat was France's heaviest in their history.

== Results ==
2 June 2007

New Zealand	42–11	France
Try: Mauger (2); Sivivatu (2); So'oialo; Con: Carter; Weepu; Evans (2); Pen: Carter; Weepu; Evans	Report	Try: Coux; Pen: Boyet (2)

Eden Park, Auckland
Attendance: 42,000
Referee: Stuart Dickinson (Australia)

FB	15	Leon MacDonald
RW	14	Joe Rokocoko
OC	13	Isaia Toeava
IC	12	Aaron Mauger
LW	11	Sitiveni Sivivatu
FH	10	Dan Carter
SH	9	Piri Weepu
N8	8	Chris Masoe
OF	7	Richie McCaw (c)
BF	6	Reuben Thorne
RL	5	Ali Williams
LL	4	Chris Jack
TP	3	Carl Hayman
HK	2	Keven Mealamu
LP	1	Tony Woodcock
Replacements:
HK	16	Andrew Hore	Substituted on
PR	17	Neemia Tialata	Substituted on
LK	18	Troy Flavell	Substituted on
FL	19	Rodney So'oialo	Substituted on
SH	20	Brendon Leonard	Substituted on
FH	21	Nick Evans	Substituted on
CE	22	Ma'a Nonu	Substituted on
Coach:
(New Zealand) Graham Henry

FB	15	Thomas Castaignède
RW	14	Benjamin Thiéry
OC	13	Arnaud Mignardi
IC	12	Jean-Philippe Grandclaude
LW	11	Jean-François Coux
FH	10	Benjamin Boyet	Temporarily suspended
SH	9	Nicolas Durand
N8	8	Sébastien Chabal
OF	7	Olivier Magne
BF	6	Grégory Le Corvec
RL	5	Julien Pierre
LL	4	Pascal Papé (c)
TP	3	Nicolas Mas
HK	2	Sébastien Bruno
LP	1	Christian Califano
Replacements:
HK	16	Raphaël Ibañez		Substituted on
PR	17	Franck Montanella		Substituted on
LK	18	Olivier Olibeau		Substituted on
FL	19	Damien Chouly		Substituted on
SH	20	Mickaël Forest		Substituted on
FH	21	Nicolas Laharrague		Substituted on
CE	22	Ludovic Valbon		Substituted on
Coach:
(France) Bernard Laporte

9 June 2007

New Zealand	61–10	France
Try: Oliver; Kelleher; Rokocoko (2); MacDonald; Toeava; Collins; Mealamu; Evans; Con: McAlister (5); Pen: McAlister (2)	Report	Try: J. Laharrague; Con: Boyet; Pen: Boyet

Wellington Regional Stadium, Wellington
Attendance: 36,000
Referee: Craig Joubert (South Africa)

FB	15	Leon MacDonald
RW	14	Joe Rokocoko
OC	13	Isaia Toeava
IC	12	Luke McAlister
LW	11	Sitiveni Sivivatu
FH	10	Nick Evans
SH	9	Byron Kelleher
N8	8	Rodney So'oialo
OF	7	Richie McCaw (c)
BF	6	Jerry Collins
RL	5	Ali Williams
LL	4	Chris Jack
TP	3	Carl Hayman
HK	2	Anton Oliver
LP	1	Tony Woodcock
Replacements:
HK	16	Keven Mealamu	Substituted on
PR	17	Neemia Tialata	Substituted on
LK	18	Troy Flavell	Substituted on
FL	19	Chris Masoe	Substituted on
SH	20	Brendon Leonard	Substituted on
CE	21	Ma'a Nonu	Substituted on
WG	22	Doug Howlett	Substituted on
Coach:
(New Zealand) Graham Henry

FB	15	Thomas Castaignède
RW	14	Julien Laharrague
OC	13	Arnaud Mignardi
IC	12	Lionel Mazars
LW	11	Jean-François Coux
FH	10	Benjamin Boyet
SH	9	Nicolas Durand
N8	8	Sébastien Chabal
OF	7	Olivier Magne
BF	6	Damien Chouly
RL	5	Julien Pierre
LL	4	Pascal Papé (c)
TP	3	Olivier Sourgens
HK	2	Sébastien Bruno
LP	1	Christian Califano
Replacements:
HK	16	Raphaël Ibañez	Substituted on
PR	17	Nicolas Mas	Substituted on
LK	18	Olivier Olibeau	Substituted on
FL	19	Fulgence Ouedraogo	Substituted on
SH	20	Mickaël Forest	Substituted on
FH	21	Nicolas Laharrague	Substituted on
CE	22	Benjamin Thiéry	Substituted on
Coach:
(France) Bernard Laporte
