= 2008 France rugby union tour of Australia =

- Coach: Marc Lièvremont
- Tour captain: Lionel Nallet
- Top point scorer: François Trinh-Duc (10)
- Top try scorer(s): Alexis Palisson (1); François Trinh-Duc (1)
Summary
P	W	D	L
Total
2	0	0	2
Test match
2	0	0	2
Opponent
P	W	D	L
Australia
2	0	0	2

Tour chronology
- ← New Zealand 2007 New Zealand & Australia 2009 →

The 2008 France rugby union tour of Australia was a series of matches played in June–July 2008 in Australia by France national rugby union team. The French (with 12 "newcomers" and without the player of the club finalist of Top 14) lost heavily both test.

== Results ==
28 June 2008

Australia	34–13	France
Try: Giteau 35', Sharpe 42'; Elsom 46', Mortlock 62'; Con: Giteau 36' 43' 47' 63'; Pen: Giteau 18' 50'	Report	Try: Palisson 66; Con: Trin-Duc 67'; Pen: Yachvili 21' 40'

Stadium Australia, Sydney
Attendance: 49,000
Referee: Marius Jonker (South Africa)

Australia			France
Cameron Shepherd	FB	15	FB	Pepito Elhorga (substituted off) 22'
Peter Hynes	W	14	W	Alexis Palisson
(capt.) Stirling Mortlock	C	13	C	François Trinh-Duc
(substituted off) 56' Berrick Barnes	C	12	C	Damien Traille
(substituted off) 28' Lote Tuqiri	W	11	W	Benjamin Thiery
Matt Giteau	FH	10	FH	Benjamin Boyet (substituted off) 62'
(substituted off) 69' Luke Burgess	SH	9	SH	Dimitri Yachvili (substituted off) 60'
(substituted off) 45' Wycliff Palu	N8	8	N8	Louis Picamoles (substituted off) 57'
(substituted off) 65' George Smith	F	7	F	Imanol Harinordoquy
Rocky Elsom	F	6	F	Fulgence Ouedraogo
Nathan Sharpe	L	5	L	Lionel Nallet (capt.) (substituted off) 69'
James Horwill	L	4	L	Sébastien Chabal
Al Baxter	P	3	P	Benoit Lecouls
(substituted off) 69' Stephen Moore	H	2	H	Sébastien Bruno (substituted off) 49'
(substituted off) 59' Benn Robinson	P	1	P	Lionel Faure (substituted off) 48'
		Replacements
(substituted in) 69' Adam Freier	H	16	H	Benjamin Kayser (substituted in) 49'
(substituted in) 59' Ben Alexander	P	17	P	Renaud Boyoud (substituted in) 48'
(substituted in) 65' Dean Mumm	F	18	L	David Couzinet (substituted in) 69'
(substituted in) 45' Phil Waugh	N8	19	N8	Matthieu Lievremont (substituted in) 57'
(substituted in) 69' Sam Cordingley	SH	20	SH	Sebastien Tillous-Borde (substituted in) 60'
(substituted in) 56' Ryan Cross	C	21	FH	Thibault Lacroix (substituted in) 62'
(substituted in) 28' Adam Ashley-Cooper	W	22	FB	David Janin (substituted in) 22'
		Coaches
(New Zealand) Robbie Deans				Marc Lièvremont (France)

5 July 2008

Australia	40–10	France
Try: Hynes 6', Horwill (36'; Cross 57' 67; Con: Giteau 7' 36' 58' 68'; Pen: Giteau 3' 15' 23' 28'	Report	Try: Trinh-Duc 80'; Con: Yachvili 80'; Pen: Trinh-Duc 40'

Lang Park, Brisbane
Attendance: 50,000
Referee: Paul Honiss (New Zealand)

Australia			France
Adam Ashley-Cooper	FB	15	FB	Benjamin Thiery
Peter Hynes	W	14	W	Alexis Palisson
(substituted off) 72' (capt.) Stirling Mortlock	C	13	C	Maxime Mermoz (substituted off) 41'
(substituted off) 52' Berrick Barnes	C	12	C	Thibault Lacroix (substituted off) 56'
Lachie Turner	W	11	W	David Janin
Matt Giteau	FH	10	FH	François Trinh-Duc
23' to 43' (substituted off) 73' Luke Burgess	SH	9	SH	Sebastien Tillous-Borde (substituted off) 79'
(substituted off) 50' Stephen Hoiles	N8	8	N8	Imanol Harinordoquy 25' to 39'
Phil Waugh	F	7	F	Fulgence Ouedraogo (substituted off) 61'
Rocky Elsom	F	6	F	Matthieu Lievremont
Dean Mumm	L	5	L	Lionel Nallet (capt.)
(substituted off) 39' James Horwill	L	4	L	Sébastien Chabal (substituted off) 75'
Al Baxter	P	3	P	Renaud Boyoud
(substituted off) 73' Stephen Moore	H	2	H	Sébastien Bruno (substituted off) 62'
(substituted off) 61' Benn Robinson	P	1	P	Pierre Correia (substituted off) 50'
		Replacements
(substituted in) 73' Adam Freier	H	16	H	Benjamin Kayser (substituted in) 62'
(substituted in) 61' Ben Alexander	P	17	P	Benoit Lecouls (substituted in) 50'
(substituted in) 39' Hugh McMeniman	L	18	C	Benjamin Boyet (yellow card) 65' to 75' (substituted in) 41'
(substituted in) 50' George Smith	N8	19	N8	Louis Picamoles (substituted in) (substituted off) 25'-39' (substituted in) 61'
(substituted in) (substituted off) 23'-43' (substituted in) 73' Sam Cordingley	SH	20	L	Yannick Caballero (substituted in) 75'
(substituted in) 52' Ryan Cross	C	21	SH	Dimitri Yachvili (substituted in) 79'
(substituted in) 72' Cameron Shepherd	C	22	FB	Jean-Baptiste Peyras-Loustalet (substituted in) 56'
		Coaches
(New Zealand) Robbie Deans				Marc Lièvremont (France)
