= 2008 Six Nations Championship squads =

Rugby union competition squads

== England ==
Squad announced on 9 January 2008, accessed from BBC. Caps updated 10 January 2008 from RFU. On 19 January 2008, Peter Richards was injured playing in a match for London Irish and ruled out of the Six Nations. Due to more injuries in the squad London Irish scrum-half Paul Hodgson, Bath flanker Michael Lipman and Gloucester number eight Luke Narraway were all called up to the squad. On 2 February 2008, in England's opening match, Mike Tindall and Tom Rees were injured and ruled out of the rest of the tournament, while David Strettle is out for four to eight weeks. Because of this Newcastle scrum-half Lee Dickson, London Irish fly-half Shane Geraghty and Sale flanker Magnus Lund were added to the squad. Andrew Sheridan and Phil Vickery were forced to withdraw from England's game against Italy, Bristol's Jason Hobson was called up to the bench as a reserve.

Head Coach: Brian Ashton

Note: Flags indicate national union for the club/province as defined by World Rugby.

Player	Position	Date of birth (age)	Caps	Club/province
George Chuter	Hooker	9 July 1976	19	(England) Leicester
Lee Mears	Hooker	5 March 1979	18	(England) Bath
Mark Regan	Hooker	28 January 1972	43	(England) Bristol
Jason Hobson	Prop	10 February 1983	0	(England) Bristol
Tim Payne	Prop	29 April 1979	5	(England) Wasps
Andrew Sheridan	Prop	1 November 1979	20	(England) Sale
Matt Stevens	Prop	1 October 1982	20	(England) Bath
Phil Vickery (c)	Prop	14 March 1976	60	(England) Wasps
Steve Borthwick	Lock	12 October 1979	32	(England) Bath
Louis Deacon	Lock	7 October 1980	6	(England) Leicester
Ben Kay	Lock	14 December 1975	53	(England) Leicester
Simon Shaw	Lock	1 September 1973	43	(England) Wasps
Tom Croft	Flanker	7 November 1985	0	(England) Leicester
James Haskell	Flanker	2 April 1985	2	(England) Wasps
Michael Lipman	Flanker	16 January 1980	3	(England) Bath
Magnus Lund	Flanker	25 June 1983	10	(England) Sale
Lewis Moody	Flanker	12 June 1978	52	(England) Leicester
Tom Rees	Flanker	11 September 1984	8	(England) Wasps
Joe Worsley	Flanker	14 June 1977	65	(England) Wasps
Nick Easter	Number 8	15 August 1978	12	(England) Harlequins
Luke Narraway	Number 8	7 September 1983	0	(England) Gloucester
Danny Care	Scrum-half	2 January 1987	0	(England) Harlequins
Lee Dickson	Scrum-half	29 March 1985	0	(England) Newcastle
Andy Gomarsall	Scrum-half	24 July 1974	33	(England) Harlequins
Paul Hodgson	Scrum-half	25 April 1982	0	(England) London Irish
Peter Richards	Scrum-half	10 March 1978	12	(England) London Irish
Richard Wigglesworth	Scrum-half	9 June 1983	0	(England) Sale
Danny Cipriani	Fly-half	2 November 1987	0	(England) Wasps
Shane Geraghty	Fly-half	12 August 1986	2	(England) London Irish
Charlie Hodgson	Fly-half	12 November 1980	29	(England) Sale
Jonny Wilkinson	Fly-half	25 May 1979	65	(England) Newcastle
Toby Flood	Centre	8 August 1985	12	(England) Newcastle
Jamie Noon	Centre	9 May 1979	27	(England) Newcastle
Mathew Tait	Centre	6 February 1986	19	(England) Newcastle
Mike Tindall	Centre	18 October 1978	54	(England) Gloucester
Paul Sackey	Wing	8 November 1979	10	(England) Wasps
James Simpson-Daniel	Wing	30 May 1982	10	(England) Gloucester
David Strettle	Wing	23 July 1983	3	(England) Harlequins
Lesley Vainikolo	Wing	4 May 1979	5	(England) Gloucester
Iain Balshaw	Fullback	14 April 1979	30	(England) Gloucester
Mark Cueto	Fullback	26 December 1979	24	(England) Sale

== France ==
Initial squad announced on 22 January 2008, accessed from BBC. Changes since then are:

- Before the competition began, Florian Fritz was injured in training on 30 January 2008 and will miss the whole of the Six Nations. David Marty was called up to replace him. Prop Nicolas Mas was also called up to the squad to replace Jean-Baptiste Poux.
- After France's first match, Anthony Floch was called up to the squad because of an injury to Julien Malzieu and Louis Picamoles was also called up in place of Elvis Vermeulen, who was dropped from the squad completely due to a rib injury.
- After France's second match, locks Romain Millo-Chluski and Pascal Papé and fullback Clément Poitrenaud were called up to the squad, in place of Loïc Jacquet, Arnaud Méla and Anthony Floch on 13 February; Floch was re-called after Poitrenaud broke his ankle, and Jean-Baptiste Poux replaced the injured Julien Brugnaut. On 19 February, Millo-Chluski withdrew because of injury and Jérôme Thion was called up as a replacement. Dimitri Yachvili was also called up to the squad when Jean-Baptiste Élissalde was ruled out with a calf injury.
- After France's loss to England in Round 3, coach Marc Lièvremont dropped seven players from his squad—Cédric Heymans, Morgan Parra, Thierry Dusautoir, Lionel Faure, David Marty, David Skrela and William Servat. Five uncapped players were called up for the Italy match: Fabien Barcella, Yann David, Guilhem Guirado, Julien Tomas and Ibrahim Diarra. Julien Malzieu returned to the squad after recovering from his injury, and veteran Yannick Jauzion was recalled. Julien Bonnaire was initially dropped in favour of Imanol Harinordoquy, but returned to the squad after Harinordoquy was ruled out with a muscle tear in an ankle suffered on 23 February. Arnaud Méla was recalled after Papé suffered a knee injury on 1 March.
- For the championship decider against Wales, Lièvremont chose to recall several veterans. David, Diarra, Guirado, Picamoles, Aurélien Rougerie, and Tomas were dropped. Both Élissalde and Vermeulen returned to the squad after recovering from their injuries. Also returning to the squad were Dusautoir, Heymans, Servat, and Skrela.

Head Coach: Marc Lièvremont

Note: Flags indicate national union for the club/province as defined by World Rugby.

Player	Position	Date of birth (age)	Caps	Club/province
Guilhem Guirado	Hooker	17 June 1986	1	(France) Perpignan
William Servat	Hooker	9 December 1978	16	(France) Toulouse
Dimitri Szarzewski	Hooker	26 January 1983	22	(France) Stade Français
Fabien Barcella	Prop	27 October 1983	3	(France) Auch
Julien Brugnaut	Prop	17 November 1981	0	(France) Dax
Lionel Faure	Prop	26 November 1977	0	(England) Sale
Nicolas Mas	Prop	25 May 1980	15	(France) Perpignan
Jean-Baptiste Poux	Prop	26 September 1979	21	(France) Toulouse
Loic Jacquet	Lock	31 March 1985	2	(France) Clermont
Arnaud Méla	Lock	19 January 1980	0	(France) Brive
Romain Millo-Chluski	Lock	20 April 1983	4	(France) Toulouse
Lionel Nallet (c)	Lock	14 September 1976	32	(France) Castres
Pascal Papé	Lock	5 December 1980	16	(France) Stade Français
Jérôme Thion	Lock	2 December 1977	40	(France) Biarritz
Julien Bonnaire	Flanker	20 September 1978	37	(France) Clermont
Ibrahim Diarra	Flanker	25 May 1983	1	(France) Montauban
Thierry Dusautoir	Flanker	18 November 1981	11	(France) Toulouse
Fulgence Ouedraogo	Flanker	21 July 1986	1	(France) Montpellier
Imanol Harinordoquy	Number 8	20 February 1980	51	(France) Biarritz
Louis Picamoles	Number 8	5 February 1986	3	(France) Montpellier
Elvis Vermeulen	Number 8	5 April 1979	8	(France) Clermont
Jean-Baptiste Élissalde	Scrum-half	23 November 1979	30	(France) Toulouse
Morgan Parra	Scrum-half	15 November 1988	0	(France) Bourgoin
Julien Tomas	Scrum-half	21 April 1985	2	(France) Montpellier
Dimitri Yachvili	Scrum-half	19 September 1980	38	(France) Biarritz
David Skrela	Fly-half	2 March 1979	11	(France) Stade Français
François Trinh-Duc	Fly-half	11 November 1986	0	(France) Montpellier
Yann David	Centre	15 April 1988	1	(France) Bourgoin
Florian Fritz	Centre	17 January 1984	25	(France) Toulouse
Yannick Jauzion	Centre	28 July 1978	55	(France) Toulouse
David Marty	Centre	30 October 1982	19	(France) Perpignan
Damien Traille	Centre	12 June 1979	58	(France) Biarritz
Vincent Clerc	Wing	7 May 1981	28	(France) Toulouse
Julien Malzieu	Wing	4 May 1983	0	(France) Clermont
Aurélien Rougerie	Wing	26 September 1980	51	(France) Clermont
Anthony Floch	Fullback	12 February 1983	3	(France) Clermont
Cédric Heymans	Fullback	20 July 1978	37	(France) Toulouse
Clément Poitrenaud	Fullback	20 May 1982	32	(France) Toulouse

== Ireland ==
Squad announced 15 January 2008, accessed from BBC. Cap totals updated 16 January 2008 from IRFU. On 24 January 2008, Jerry Flannery was handed an eight-week suspension for stamping on Julien Bonnaire in a match for Munster, therefore ruling him out of taking any part in the Six Nations. He later appealed against this decision and had his ban reduced to one month, making him available for Ireland's final three games. Gordon D'Arcy broke his right arm in the first half of Ireland's Six Nations opener against Italy on 2 February, ending his Six Nations campaign. On 19 February, Paul O'Connell was named on the bench for Ireland's game against Scotland after making a successful return from a back injury.

Head Coach: Eddie O'Sullivan

Note: Flags indicate national union for the club/province as defined by World Rugby.

Player	Position	Date of birth (age)	Caps	Club/province
Rory Best	Hooker	15 August 1982	17	(Ireland) Ulster
Jerry Flannery	Hooker	17 October 1978	21	(Ireland) Munster
Bernard Jackman	Hooker	5 May 1976	4	(Ireland) Leinster
Tony Buckley	Prop	8 October 1980	2	(Ireland) Munster
John Hayes	Prop	2 November 1973	79	(Ireland) Munster
Cian Healy	Prop	7 October 1987	0	(Ireland) Leinster
Marcus Horan	Prop	7 September 1977	51	(Ireland) Munster
Leo Cullen	Lock	9 January 1978	19	(Ireland) Leinster
Donncha O'Callaghan	Lock	23 March 1979	40	(Ireland) Munster
Paul O'Connell	Lock	20 October 1979	52	(Ireland) Munster
Mick O'Driscoll	Lock	8 October 1978	11	(Ireland) Munster
Malcolm O'Kelly	Lock	19 July 1974	90	(Ireland) Leinster
Neil Best	Flanker	3 April 1979	18	(Ireland) Ulster
Simon Easterby	Flanker	21 July 1975	62	(Wales) Scarlets
Johnny O'Connor	Flanker	9 February 1980	12	(Ireland) Connacht
Alan Quinlan	Flanker	13 July 1974	25	(Ireland) Munster
David Wallace	Flanker	8 July 1976	41	(Ireland) Munster
Jamie Heaslip	Number 8	3 December 1983	3	(Ireland) Leinster
Denis Leamy	Number 8	27 November 1981	27	(Ireland) Munster
Eoin Reddan	Scrum-half	20 November 1980	5	(England) Wasps
Peter Stringer	Scrum-half	13 December 1977	79	(Ireland) Munster
Ronan O'Gara	Fly-half	7 March 1977	77	(Ireland) Munster
Johnny Sexton	Fly-half	11 July 1985	0	(Ireland) Leinster
Paddy Wallace	Fly-half	27 August 1979	9	(Ireland) Ulster
Gordon D'Arcy	Centre	10 February 1980	36	(Ireland) Leinster
Gavin Duffy	Centre	18 September 1981	9	(Ireland) Connacht
Brian O'Driscoll (c)	Centre	21 January 1979	79	(Ireland) Leinster
Andrew Trimble	Centre	20 October 1984	19	(Ireland) Ulster
Tommy Bowe	Wing	22 February 1984	10	(Ireland) Ulster
Luke Fitzgerald	Wing	13 September 1987	2	(Ireland) Leinster
Shane Horgan	Wing	18 July 1978	58	(Ireland) Leinster
Rob Kearney	Wing	26 March 1986	1	(Ireland) Leinster
Girvan Dempsey	Fullback	2 October 1975	78	(Ireland) Leinster
Geordan Murphy	Fullback	19 April 1978	53	(England) Leicester

== Italy ==
Squad announced 9 January 2008, accessed from BBC. Nick Mallett decided to drop Denis Dallan, Enrico Patrizio, Ludovico Nitoglia, Ramiro Pez, Robert Barbieri and Antonio Pavanello from the original squad, while former captain Marco Bortolami is out for the first half of the tournament with an eye injury. Carlos Nieto missed the game against Ireland because of the death of his father, meaning Lorenzo Cittadini took his place on the bench. He then returned for their match against England. On the announcement of Italy's squad for their game against Wales, Matteo Pratichetti, Kaine Robertson and Pablo Canavosio were ruled out with minor injuries, Enrico Patrizio and Ludovico Nitoglia were recalled due to this. Meanwhile, David Bortolussi was injured in training and ruled out for the rest of the tournament, Paolo Buso took his place in the squad. Also with the return of Marco Bortolami to full fitness, Tommaso Reato lost his place in the squad. But then Ludovico Nitoglia once again lost his place in squad, this time to Alessio Galante

On 27 February, Mauro Bergamasco was handed a 13-week ban for gouging Wales' Lee Byrne during the teams' match.

Head Coach: Nick Mallett

Note: Flags indicate national union for the club/province as defined by World Rugby.

Player	Position	Date of birth (age)	Caps	Club/province
Carlo Festuccia	Hooker	20 June 1980	39	(France) Métro Racing
Leonardo Ghiraldini	Hooker	26 December 1984	5	(Italy) Calvisano
Fabio Ongaro	Hooker	23 September 1977	18	(England) Saracens
Martin Castrogiovanni	Prop	21 October 1981	45	(England) Leicester
Lorenzo Cittadini	Prop	17 December 1982	0	(Italy) Calvisano
Andrea Lo Cicero	Prop	7 May 1976	67	(France) Métro Racing
Carlos Nieto	Prop	25 June 1976	21	(England) Gloucester
Salvatore Perugini	Prop	6 March 1978	44	(France) Toulouse
Marco Bortolami	Lock	12 June 1980	67	(England) Gloucester
Carlo Del Fava	Lock	1 July 1981	21	(Ireland) Ulster
Santiago Dellapè	Lock	9 May 1978	44	(France) Biarritz
Antonio Pavanello	Lock	13 October 1982	0	(Italy) Treviso
Tommaso Reato	Lock	12 May 1984	0	(Italy) Rugby Rovigo
Robert Barbieri	Flanker	5 June 1984	0	(Italy) Treviso
Mauro Bergamasco	Flanker	1 May 1979	58	(France) Stade Français
Josh Sole	Flanker	15 February 1980	21	(Italy) Viadana
Alessandro Zanni	Flanker	31 January 1984	16	(Italy) Calvisano
Jaco Erasmus	Number 8	31 July 1979	2	(Italy) Viadana
Sergio Parisse (c)	Number 8	13 September 1983	42	(France) Stade Français
Simon Picone	Scrum-half	26 September 1982	10	(Italy) Treviso
Pietro Travagli	Scrum-half	28 April 1981	2	(Italy) Rugby Parma
Paolo Buso	Fly-half	28 July 1986	1	(Italy) Calvisano
Andrea Masi	Fly-half	30 March 1981	31	(France) Biarritz
Ramiro Pez	Fly-half	6 December 1978	40	(Italy) Venezia Mestre
Mirco Bergamasco	Centre	23 February 1983	44	(France) Stade Français
Gonzalo Canale	Centre	11 November 1982	33	(France) Clermont
Pablo Canavosio	Centre	26 December 1981	16	(France) Castres
Denis Dallan	Centre	4 March 1978	40	(France) Stade Français
Enrico Patrizio	Centre	15 January 1985	1	(Italy) Petrarca Rugby
Alessio Galante	Wing	24 October 1983	0	(Italy) Gran Parma
Ezio Galon	Wing	22 July 1977	11	(Italy) Rugby Parma
Ludovico Nitoglia	Wing	27 October 1983	10	(Italy) Calvisano
Matteo Pratichetti	Wing	27 July 1985	7	(Italy) Calvisano
Kaine Robertson	Wing	29 October 1980	23	(Italy) Viadana
Alberto Sgarbi	Wing	26 November 1986	0	(Italy) Treviso
David Bortolussi	Fullback	21 July 1981	10	(France) Montpellier
Andrea Marcato	Fullback	13 April 1983	2	(Italy) Treviso

== Scotland ==
Squad announced 8 January 2008, accessed from BBC. Caps updated 17 January 2008 from SRU. After originally being dropped from the squad, hooker Dougie Hall, props Bruce Douglas and Craig Smith and lock Scott Murray were all called up to the squad due to injuries in the main squad.

Head coach: Frank Hadden

Note: Flags indicate national union for the club/province as defined by World Rugby.

Player	Position	Date of birth (age)	Caps	Club/province
Ross Ford	Hooker	23 April 1984	16	(Scotland) Edinburgh
Dougie Hall	Hooker	24 September 1980	19	(Scotland) Glasgow
Scott Lawson	Hooker	28 September 1981	15	(England) Sale
Fergus Thomson	Hooker	18 September 1983	3	(Scotland) Glasgow
Alasdair Dickinson	Prop	11 September 1983	1	(England) Gloucester
Bruce Douglas	Prop	10 February 1980	43	(Wales) Scarlets
Allan Jacobsen	Prop	22 September 1978	22	(Scotland) Edinburgh
Gavin Kerr	Prop	3 April 1977	47	(Scotland) Glasgow
Moray Low	Prop	28 November 1984	0	(Scotland) Glasgow
Euan Murray	Prop	7 August 1980	15	(England) Northampton
Craig Smith	Prop	30 August 1978	23	(Scotland) Edinburgh
James Hamilton	Lock	17 November 1982	13	(England) Leicester
Nathan Hines	Lock	29 November 1976	48	(France) Perpignan
Alastair Kellock	Lock	14 June 1981	7	(Scotland) Glasgow
Scott MacLeod	Lock	3 March 1979	14	(Wales) Scarlets
Scott Murray	Lock	15 January 1976	87	(France) Montauban
John Barclay	Flanker	24 September 1986	1	(Scotland) Glasgow
Kelly Brown	Flanker	8 June 1982	19	(Scotland) Glasgow
Ally Hogg	Flanker	20 July 1983	39	(Scotland) Edinburgh
Ross Rennie	Flanker	29 March 1986	0	(Scotland) Edinburgh
Alasdair Strokosch	Flanker	21 February 1983	1	(England) Gloucester
Jason White (c)	Flanker	17 April 1978	63	(England) Sale
Johnnie Beattie	Number 8	21 November 1985	3	(Scotland) Glasgow
David Callam	Number 8	15 February 1983	10	(Scotland) Edinburgh
Simon Taylor	Number 8	17 August 1979	58	(France) Stade Français
Mike Blair	Scrum-half	20 April 1981	43	(Scotland) Edinburgh
Chris Cusiter	Scrum-half	13 June 1982	36	(France) Perpignan
Rory Lawson	Scrum-half	12 March 1981	9	(England) Gloucester
Phil Godman	Fly-half	20 May 1982	8	(Scotland) Edinburgh
Calum MacRae	Fly-half	26 January 1980	0	(Scotland) Edinburgh
Dan Parks	Fly-half	26 May 1978	37	(Scotland) Glasgow
Ben Cairns	Centre	29 October 1985	0	(Scotland) Edinburgh
Nick De Luca	Centre	1 February 1984	0	(Scotland) Edinburgh
Rob Dewey	Centre	19 October 1983	13	(Ireland) Ulster
Andrew Henderson	Centre	3 February 1980	49	(Scotland) Glasgow
Graeme Morrison	Centre	17 October 1982	6	(Scotland) Glasgow
Simon Danielli	Wing	8 September 1979	13	(Ireland) Ulster
Thom Evans	Wing	2 April 1985	0	(Scotland) Glasgow
Chris Paterson	Wing	30 March 1978	81	(England) Gloucester
Nikki Walker	Wing	5 March 1982	10	(Wales) Ospreys
Simon Webster	Wing	8 March 1981	29	(Scotland) Edinburgh
Rory Lamont	Fullback	10 March 1982	14	(England) Sale
Hugo Southwell	Fullback	14 May 1980	36	(Scotland) Edinburgh

== Wales ==
Squad announced 14 January 2008, accessed from BBC. Caps updated 14 January 2008 from WRU. In Wales' opening game of the Six Nations, Alun Wyn Jones was left with an injury to his ankle. For their next game, Warren Gatland called up Cardiff lock Deiniol Jones to cover for him.

Head Coach: Warren Gatland

Note: Flags indicate national union for the club/province as defined by World Rugby.

Player	Position	Date of birth (age)	Caps	Club/province
Huw Bennett	Hooker	11 June 1983	14	(Wales) Ospreys
Matthew Rees	Hooker	9 December 1980	16	(Wales) Scarlets
Gareth Williams	Hooker	19 December 1978	5	(Wales) Blues
Gethin Jenkins	Prop	17 November 1980	53	(Wales) Blues
Adam Jones	Prop	8 March 1981	44	(Wales) Ospreys
Duncan Jones	Prop	18 September 1978	45	(Wales) Ospreys
Rhys M. Thomas	Prop	31 July 1982	3	(Wales) Dragons
Ian Evans	Lock	4 October 1984	8	(Wales) Ospreys
Ian Gough	Lock	10 November 1976	45	(Wales) Ospreys
Alun Wyn Jones	Lock	19 September 1985	18	(Wales) Ospreys
Deiniol Jones	Lock	18 November 1977	3	(Wales) Blues
Robin Sowden-Taylor	Flanker	9 June 1982	5	(Wales) Blues
Jonathan Thomas	Flanker	27 December 1982	39	(Wales) Ospreys
Martyn Williams	Flanker	1 September 1975	76	(Wales) Blues
Gareth Delve	Number 8	30 September 1982	4	(England) Gloucester
Ryan Jones (c)	Number 8	13 March 1981	16	(Wales) Ospreys
Alix Popham	Number 8	17 October 1979	32	(Wales) Scarlets
Gareth Cooper	Scrum-half	7 May 1979	35	(England) Gloucester
Dwayne Peel	Scrum-half	31 August 1981	59	(Wales) Scarlets
Mike Phillips	Scrum-half	29 August 1982	28	(Wales) Ospreys
James Hook	Fly-half	27 June 1985	20	(Wales) Ospreys
Stephen Jones	Fly-half	8 December 1977	66	(Wales) Scarlets
Gavin Henson	Centre	1 February 1982	23	(Wales) Ospreys
Sonny Parker	Centre	27 August 1977	27	(Wales) Ospreys
Tom Shanklin	Centre	24 November 1979	47	(Wales) Blues
Tom James	Wing	11 April 1987	2	(Wales) Blues
Mark Jones	Wing	7 November 1979	35	(Wales) Scarlets
Shane Williams	Wing	26 February 1977	51	(Wales) Ospreys
Lee Byrne	Fullback	1 June 1980	14	(Wales) Ospreys
Jamie Roberts	Fullback	8 November 1986	0	(Wales) Blues
