= Damien Chouly =

France international rugby union player

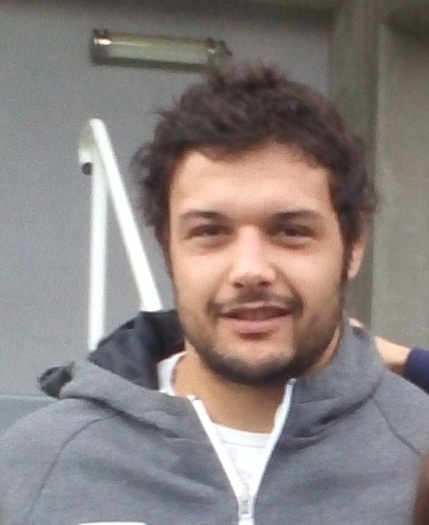
- Born: Damien Chouly; 27 November 1985 (age 40) Limoges, France
- Height: 1.92 m (6 ft 3 1/2 in)
- Weight: 111 kg (17 st 7 lb; 245 lb)

Rugby union career
- Position(s): Number eight, Flanker, Back row
Senior career
Years	Team	Apps	(Points)
2004–2007	Brive	50	(20)
2007–2012	Perpignan	139	(75)
2012–2019	Clermont	160	(80)
2019–2022	Perpignan	65	(20)
International career
Years	Team	Apps	(Points)
2006	France U21	4	(0)
2007–2017	France	46	(15)

Damien Chouly ([da.mjɛ̃ ʃu.li]; born 27 November 1985) is a former French rugby union footballer. He played for Brive, Perpignan, and Clermont Auvergne in the Top 14, commonly in the Number 8 position.

== Career ==
=== Early years ===
Chouly first appeared on the professional scene in 2004 when playing for Brive in the then Top 16. He played for Brive for three years, appearing for the club 50 times and scoring 2 tries (10 points). For the 2007–08 Top 14 season, Chouly signed for the growing Perpignan side, and in his debut season he made 25 appearances for the club. He was part of a solid pack that helped guide the club to fourth in the regular season, but getting knocked out by Clermont (21–7) in the semi-final. He played in all but 5 matches in the 2008–09 Top 14 season, making only 3 appearances of the bench in the 28 appearances. He played the full 80 minutes in the Top 14 final against Clermont, coming out victors 22–13 in Damien's second season with Perpignan. However, Clermont gained revenge the following season, beating Perpignan 19–6 in the 2009–10 Top 14 season final. Since that loss to Clermont, Perpignan failed to progress to the knock-out stages finishing 9th and 11th in Chouly's final two season with Perpignan.

=== Clermont ===
In 2012, Damien Chouly signed with Perpignan's close rival Clermont Auvergne on a three-year contract. He was head coach Vern Cotter's favoured N8, and helped form a strong pack to put Clermont top of the table in the regular season on Chouly's debut season. However, Clermont was knocked out by seed 4 team Castres Olympique in the semi-final, losing 25–9. He also helped Clermont make the 2013 Heineken Cup Final in Dublin, but lost to Toulon 16–15. He continued to develop in his second season at Clermont, taking up the vice captain roll. During the 2013–14 Top 14 season, Clermont were convincingly beaten on many occasions. Some include; a 30–19 loss to newly promoted Oyonnax, 43–3 loss to Montpellier, and most notable a 46–6 loss to Saracens in the 2013–14 Heineken Cup semi-final. In addition to this, Chouly was also part of the team that lost to Castres in the Top 14 semi-final at home – which was Clermont's first loss at home in 77 matches.

In the 2014–15 Top 14 season, Damien was named captain of Clermont by new head coach Franck Azéma.

=== France ===
Damien Chouly first represented France at Under 21 level in 2006. He was part of the U21 squad that won the 2006 Under 21 Rugby World Championship, after beating South Africa U21 24–13. The following year he was named in the France national squad for the 2007 tour of New Zealand. He made his debut in the opening test on 2 June, coming off the bench in a 42–11 loss. The following week he made his run on debut, starting at 6 to play the full 80 minutes. He was believed to be in contention for a place in France's squad for the 2007 Rugby World Cup, but head coach Bernard Laporte opted for experience in the 30-man squad. He wasn't selected again for France until 2009, when he toured New Zealand and Australia in the June test window, after putting in strong performances for Top 14 Champions Perpignan.

After signing with Clermont in 2012, he returned to the French set-up after nearly 3 years out of the International scene. He did however represent the France A side in the 2010 Churchill Cup, making 2 appearances against Canada and the United States. Under the new coaching of Philippe Saint-André, Chouly found himself as first choice Number 8, and it was under Saint-André, Chouly scored his first try – against Fiji on 16 November 2013.

== Honours ==
- Top 14: 2
  - USA Perpignan, 2008–09
  - Clermont Auvergne, 2016–17
