= France national rugby team =

France national rugby team may refer to national teams in the different varieties of rugby:

- France national rugby union team, often nicknamed les bleus, administered by Fédération Française de Rugby.
  - France national rugby sevens team compete in the World Sevens Series
  - France women's national rugby union team
  - France A national rugby union team compete in various tournaments including the Churchill Cup
- France national rugby league team, often nicknamed les chanticleers, administered by Fédération Francaise de Rugby à XIII.
