= Jean-François Coux =

French rugby union player (born 1980)

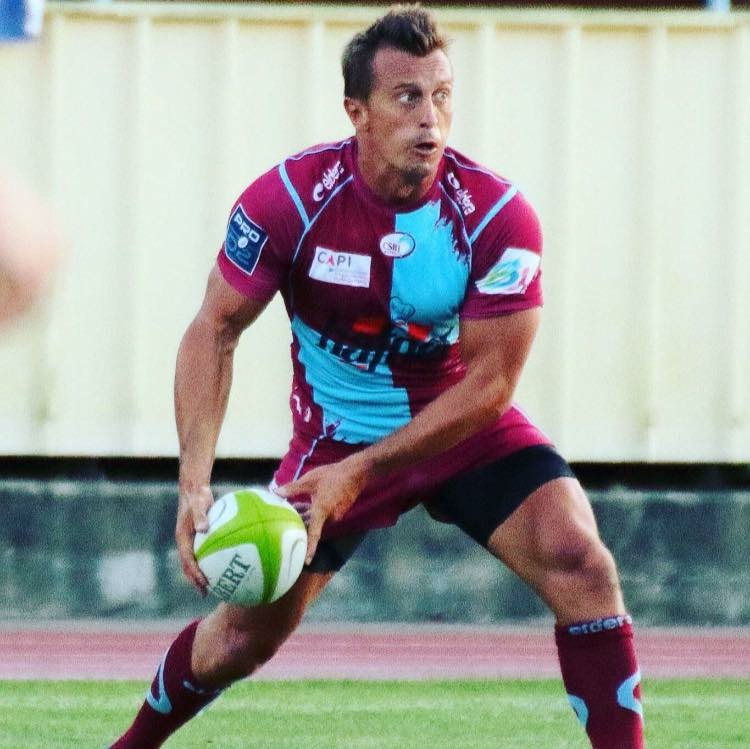
- Jean-François Coux
- Born: 23 December 1980 (age 45) Grenoble, France
- Height: 1.80 m (5 ft 11 in)
- Weight: 88 kg (13 st 12 lb)

Rugby union career
- Position: Wing
Senior career
Years	Team	Apps	(Points)
1998-1999	Vinay		
1999-2011	CS Bourgoin-Jallieu		
2011-	SU Agen		
- Correct as of 2007-06-03
International career
Years	Team	Apps	(Points)
2005	France A	1	(0)
2007	France	2	(5)
- Correct as of 2007-06-12

Jean-François Coux (born 23 December 1980 in Grenoble, France) is a French rugby union footballer. Coux's first professional club was Vinay whom he played for from 1998 to 1999. He moved to CS Bourgoin-Jallieu for the 1999-2000 Top 14 season and he left them in 2011 to join SU Agen. He mainly plays on the wing.

Representatively he has played for France A - gaining one cap against Ireland A in 2005. He was selected for France in their 2007 Tour to New Zealand. His Test debut came against the All Blacks at Eden Park, Auckland on 2 June 2007. Although France lost 42-11, Coux scored France's only try of the match.
