= Florian Faure =

French rugby union player

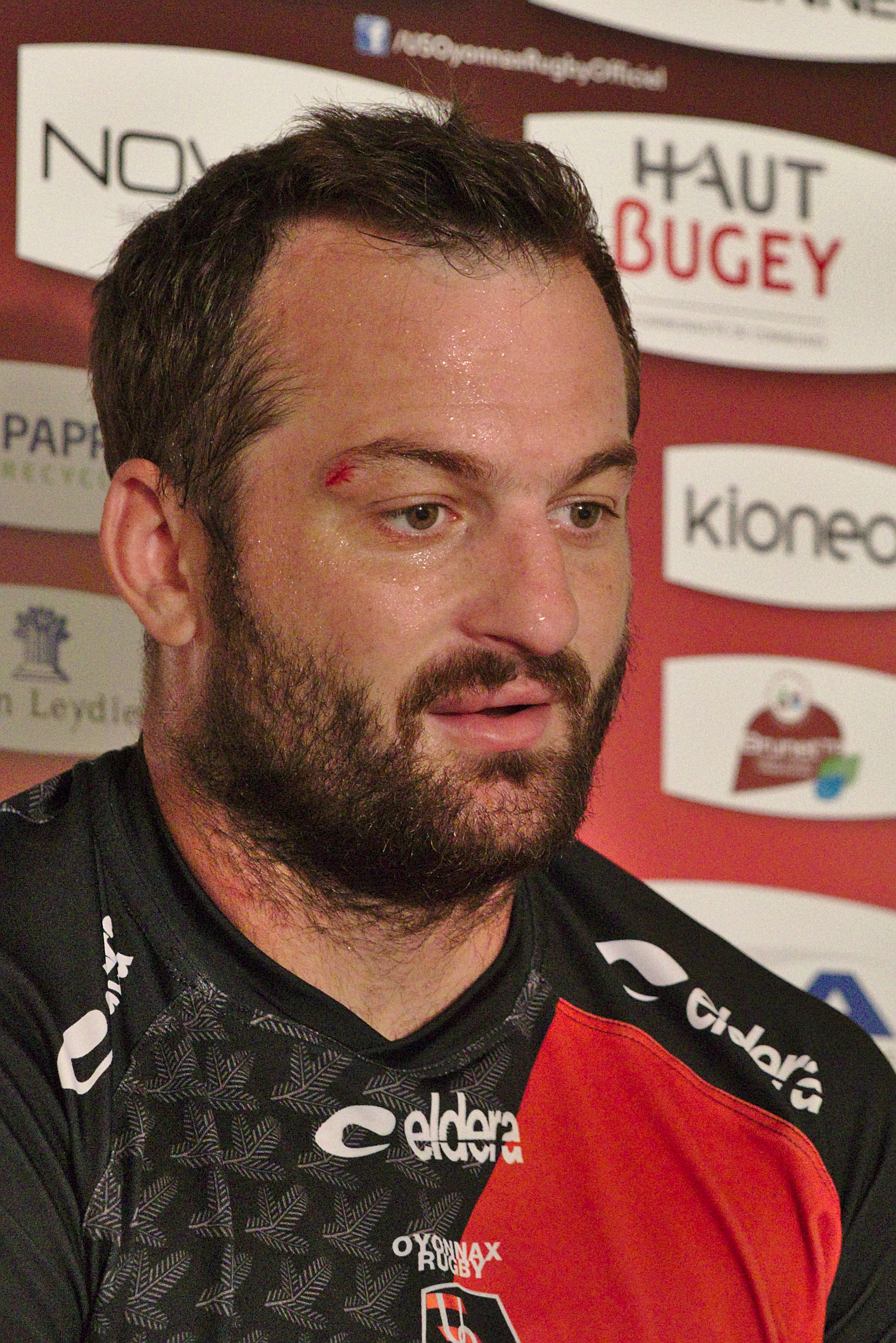
- Born: 26 March 1983 (age 43)
- Height: 1.94 m (6 ft 4 1/2 in)
- Weight: 112 kg (17 st 9 lb)

Rugby union career
- Position: Flanker
Senior career
| Years | Team | Apps | (Points) |
| 2002–2005 | FC Grenoble | 30 | (25) |
| 2005–2009 | Castres Olympique | 75 | (25) |
| 2009–2012 | Biarritz Olympique | 37 | (10) |
| 2012– | FC Grenoble | 8 | (0) |
- Correct as of 6 December 2012
International career
| Years | Team | Apps | (Points) |
- France A

Florian Faure (born 26 March 1983) is a French rugby union player. His position is Flanker and he currently plays for FC Grenoble in the Top 14.

== Career ==
He began his career with FC Grenoble, moving to Castres in 2005 after Grenoble were relegated at the end of the 2004–05 Top 16 season. He spent four seasons with Castres before moving to Biarritz in 2010. He returned to FC Grenoble in 2012 after their promotion to the Top 14.
