= France A national rugby union team =

Former second national rugby union team of France

France XV France A
- Nickname: Les Bleus (The Blues)
- Emblem: Gallic rooster
- Union: Fédération Française de Rugby
| First colours | Second colours |

First international
- France XV 27–17 Germany (Paris; 14 October 1900)

Biggest win
- France XV 126–6 Croatia (Perpignan; 19 June 1993)

Biggest defeat
- France XV 6–55 South Africa XV (Paris; 3 January 1907)

France A, also known as France XV and France B in the past, was the former name of the second national rugby union team of France behind the French national side.

In 2011 the French Rugby Federation designated the France U20 team as the second national side, and from the start of the 2017–18 season, the French Barbarians became the official second side, moving the role of the former France A team to the more prestigious invitational side with better name recognition.

== History ==
France XV first played at the 1900 Summer Olympics, in Paris, when they defeated Germany by score of 27–17, in the first ever Olympic Rugby Union Tournament. They later would play often matches for the Mediterranean Games or would represent France at the FIRA Trophy.

In 2009 they played in the IRB Nations Cup, against Italy A, Scotland A, Romania, Russia and Uruguay. The 2009 tournament was held in Romania.

== Record ==
Below is a table of the representative rugby matches played by the France A team at test level up until 19 June 2026, updated after match with England A.

| Opponent | Played | Won | Lost | Drawn | % Won |
|---|---|---|---|---|---|
| Australia A | 4 | 1 | 2 | 1 | 25% |
| Belgium | 3 | 3 | 0 | 0 | 100% |
| Brazil | 2 | 2 | 0 | 0 | 100% |
| Canada | 1 | 0 | 1 | 0 | 0% |
| Canada A | 1 | 0 | 1 | 0 | 0% |
| Catalonia | 2 | 1 | 1 | 0 | 50% |
| Croatia | 1 | 1 | 0 | 0 | 100% |
| Czechoslovakia | 7 | 7 | 0 | 0 | 100% |
| England A | 18 | 10 | 7 | 1 | 55.56% |
| Fiji Warriors | 1 | 1 | 0 | 0 | 100% |
| Germany | 1 | 1 | 0 | 0 | 100% |
| Ireland Wolfhounds | 9 | 6 | 2 | 1 | 66.67% |
| Italy | 30 | 28 | 1 | 1 | 93.33% |
| Italy A | 5 | 5 | 0 | 0 | 100% |
| Japan | 3 | 3 | 0 | 0 | 100% |
| Junior Japan | 1 | 1 | 0 | 0 | 100% |
| (New Zealand) Māori All Blacks | 2 | 0 | 2 | 0 | 0% |
| Morocco | 13 | 12 | 1 | 0 | 92.31% |
| Namibia | 3 | 3 | 0 | 0 | 100% |
| Namibia A | 2 | 2 | 0 | 0 | 100% |
| Netherlands | 4 | 4 | 0 | 0 | 100% |
| New Zealand XV | 8 | 0 | 8 | 0 | 0% |
| Poland | 8 | 8 | 0 | 0 | 100% |
| Portugal | 3 | 3 | 0 | 0 | 100% |
| Réunion | 1 | 1 | 0 | 0 | 100% |
| Romania | 5 | 5 | 0 | 0 | 100% |
| Russia | 3 | 3 | 0 | 0 | 100% |
| Scotland A | 18 | 10 | 8 | 0 | 55.56% |
| Serbia and Montenegro | 1 | 1 | 0 | 0 | 100% |
| South Africa A | 7 | 4 | 3 | 0 | 57.14% |
| Soviet Union | 13 | 9 | 3 | 1 | 69.23% |
| Spain | 24 | 23 | 1 | 0 | 95.83% |
| Tonga A | 1 | 1 | 0 | 0 | 100% |
| Tunisia | 4 | 4 | 0 | 0 | 100% |
| United States | 1 | 1 | 0 | 0 | 100% |
| Uruguay | 3 | 3 | 0 | 0 | 100% |
| Uruguay A | 1 | 1 | 0 | 0 | 100% |
| Wales A | 24 | 12 | 12 | 0 | 50% |
| West Germany | 24 | 23 | 0 | 1 | 95.83% |
| Zimbabwe | 2 | 2 | 0 | 0 | 100% |
| Total | 264 | 205 | 53 | 6 | 77.65% |

== 2010 Churchill Cup Squad ==
26-man squad:

- Florian Fritz was replaced by Romain Cabannes.
- Benjamin Boyet was replaced by Jonathan Wisniewski.
- Grégory Lamboley was replaced by Damien Chouly.
- Nicolas Durand was replaced by Julien Tomas.

- Farid Sid was replaced by Julien Arias.
- Yann David was replaced by Yoan Audrin.
- Julien Tomas was replaced by Florian Cazenave.
- Lionel Mazars was replaced by Thibault Lacroix.

Backs
| Player | Position | Club |
|---|---|---|
| Florian Cazenave | Scrum-half | Perpignan |
| Julien Dupuy | Scrum-half | Stade Français |
| Lionel Beauxis | Fly-half | Stade Français |
| Jonathan Wisniewski | Fly-half | Racing Métro |
| Romain Cabannes | Centre | Castres |
| Henry Chavancy | Centre | Racing Métro |
| Thibault Lacroix | Centre | Bayonne |
| Lionel Mazars | Centre | Bayonne |
| Julien Arias | Wing | Stade Français |
| Yoan Audrin | Wing | Castres |
| Adrien Planté | Wing | Perpignan |
| Maxime Médard | Fullback | Toulouse |
| Benjamin Thiéry | Fullback | Montpellier |

Forwards
| Player | Position | Club |
|---|---|---|
| Jean-Philippe Genevois | Hooker | Bourgoin |
| Benjamin Kayser (c) | Hooker | Stade Français |
| Clément Baïocco | Prop | Racing Métro |
| Yannick Forestier | Prop | Castres |
| Jérôme Schuster | Prop | Perpignan |
| Rabah Slimani | Prop | Stade Français |
| Yoann Maestri | Lock | Toulouse |
| Jocelino Suta | Lock | Toulon |
| Guillaume Vilaceca | Lock | Perpignan |
| Antoine Battut | Flanker | Montauban |
| Sylvain Nicolas | Flanker | Bourgoin |
| Jean-Pierre Perez | Flanker | Perpignan |
| Damien Chouly | Number eight | Perpignan |
| Florian Faure | Number eight | Biarritz |

== Honours ==
- Churchill Plate: 2010
