= Simone Favaro =

Italian international rugby union player

- Born: Simone Favaro; 7 November 1988 (age 38) Treviso, Italy
- Height: 184 cm (6 ft 0 in)
- Weight: 103 kg (227 lb; 16 st 3 lb)

Rugby union career
- Position: Back row
Youth career
- 2006−07: Treviso
Senior career
| Years | Team | Apps | (Points) |
| 2007–08 | F.I.R. Academy | | |
| 2008–09 | Rovigo | 22 | (10) |
| 2009–10 | Crociati RFC | 15 | (0) |
| 2010–12 | Aironi | 30 | (0) |
| 2012–15 | Treviso | 35 | (10) |
| 2015–17 | Glasgow Warriors | 30 | (15) |
| 2017−19 | Fiamme Oro | 22 | (10) |
- Correct as of 30 April 2019
International career
| Years | Team | Apps | (Points) |
| 2008 | Italy Under 20 | 5 | (0) |
| 2009–17 | Italy | 36 | (10) |
| 2018 | Barbarians | | |
- Correct as of 12 March 2017

Simone Favaro (born 7 November 1988) is a retired Italian international rugby union player. He made his debut for Italy against Australia on 20 June 2009. He formerly played for Glasgow Warriors and Treviso in the Pro12. Favaro plays at flanker.

== Rugby Union career ==
=== Amateur career ===
Favaro, the son of former Italy lock Roberto Favaro, started playing rugby aged nine while living in Zero Branco, on the advice of a family friend. After playing for the Treviso under-19 team, he then played in the Super 10 with Rovigo and Overmach Parma.

=== Professional career ===
He began his professional career playing for the Treviso under-19 team.

In June 2010 he joined Aironi for their first season in the Celtic League. He then moved back to Treviso.

On 18 February 2015 it was announced that Favaro would sign for the Scottish side Glasgow Warriors for the 2015–16 season in the summer of 2015. Favaro signed until May 2017. He quickly became a fan favourite and won Player of the Season in his first year with the club.

On 20 February 2017 it was announced that Favaro would leave the Warriors at the end of the season. It was announced that Favaro would sign for Stade Français for the 2017-18 season, however Favaro instead signed for Fiamme Oro in Italy's National Championship of Excellence.

He announced his retirement in May 2019.

=== International career ===
Favaro was an early developer and, at the age of 20, was the youngest player included in Nick Mallett's squad for the 2009 Six Nations Championship. Favaro did not feature in the Championship; he subsequently made his debut against Australia in the 2009 Summer tour of the Southern Hemisphere.
