= Glyn School =

Location
- The Kingsway; Ewell; Epsom, Surrey, KT17 1NB; England; 51.3434°N 0.2559°W

Information
- Type: Academy
- Mottoes: Tenax propositi ulteriora peto (Firm of purpose I seek for nothing but the best.); Learn, Achieve, Enjoy, Succeed
- Established: September 1927
- Local authority: Surrey
- Department for Education URN: 136534 Tables
- Ofsted: Reports
- Chair & Vice Chair of Governors: Elizabeth Pepper & Alex Skinner
- Headteacher: Jo Garrod
- Staff: 161
- Gender: Boys (girls admitted for sixth form)
- Age: 11 to 18
- Enrolment: 1715
- Houses: • Abbey • Bourne • Carew • Derby • Merton • Oaks • St. Benet • Tudor
- Website: www.glynschool.org

Glyn School is a boys' comprehensive secondary school – with a co-educational sixth form – in the borough of Epsom and Ewell in the English county of Surrey.

== History ==
The school was originally called Epsom County Grammar School for Boys, which then was changed to Glyn County Grammar School for Boys (informally “Glyn Grammar”) at the instigation of the new headteacher Norman Dawson in 1951. After its transformation into a comprehensive school it was named Glyn ADT and then Glyn Technology School. Latterly, from 1 April 2011, after its conversion to academy status, the school has been known as Glyn School.

== Admissions ==
As of September 1993, the sixth form began accepting applications from female students, generally from neighbouring girls' school, Rosebery. This experiment was abandoned and started again in 2005. Since then, the female population at the school has grown from a handful to represent around 25% of the sixth-form body. In 2010, the role of Head Girl was established to represent them alongside the male majority of the school.

== Rankings ==
The school's GCSE results reached successive record heights in each of the 7 years to 2013, the school's A level results of 2012 passing the previous best of 2009. The GCSE results in 2012 saw 12% gaining at least 5 GCSEs between A* to C and 20% gaining five or more including English and mathematics. 29% and 31% for 2013, ranking number 89 for two years running in Surrey for state secondary schools. The 2013 results for Glyn boys compared to boys in all Surrey state schools ranks Glyn at number 78.

== Current administration ==
In January 2010, Glyn became a National Support School and between October 2010 and January 2014, Jon Chaloner (the previous head) was executive headteacher of both Glyn and Danetree Junior School. In September 2012, GLF Schools was created as a multi-academy trust comprising Glyn and Danetree. In 2020, Jo Garrod took the role of headteacher, with Matt Duffield instead becoming executive headteacher.

=== Previous headteachers ===
- Mr Frank Clark (1927–51)
- Mr Norman Dawson (1951–68)
- Dr Charles Bingham (1968–77)
- Mr Bryan Collins (1977–86)
- Mr Stuart Turner (1986–2006)
- Mr Jon Chaloner (2006–15)
- Mr Phillip Wheatley (2015–2017)
- Mr Matt Duffield (2017–2020)
- Mrs Jo Garrod (2020-)

== Houses ==
Students are allocated equally into eight houses upon entry. Coloured school ties represents students' houses, these are: Abbey, Bourne, Carew, Derby, Merton, Oaks, St. Benet and Tudor.

House competitions include sports and academic subjects. The house which accumulates the most merits (referred to as Achievement Points) on these combined factors at the end of every academic year is awarded with the Victor Ludorum trophy.

== The prefect system ==
Each house appoints its own Senior Prefect, a student in the upper sixth. The prefect's role is to bridge the link between the school's staff and the students within the house. The prefect is often responsible for organising and co-ordinating inner-house activities and inter-house competitions. Each Senior Prefect has a small group of prefects who assist. In 2009–10, the school acknowledged the growing female presence in the upper school by conferring the title of Head Girl upon a member of the upper-sixth, alongside the Head Boy and his deputies. In 2011–12, the post of Deputy Head Girl was created.

== Assessment ==
The school was judged Outstanding in 2012, under a reformed and more critical Ofsted inspection regime, the highest category as at the previous inspection. At this time, in each of the four grouped criteria assessed the school was outstanding.

In each of the main three subjects analysed, results in 2012 were grouped in the top quintile (five equal groups) nationally.

Percentage of students achieving 5+ A*-C GCSEs (or equivalent) including English and maths	2010	2011	2012
School	82%	81%	86%
Local Authority	62%	63.5%	64.2%
England	53.5%	59%	59.4%

== Alumni ==
=== Glyn County Grammar School for Boys ===
- John Austin, MP for Erith and Thamesmead (1997–2010) (Labour)
- Peter John Michael Clarke, police officer
- Douglas French, MP for Gloucester (1987–97) (Conservative)
- Dario Gradi, football manager at Crewe Alexandra F.C. Academy
- David Hemmings, operatic singer, later film actor
- Marc Neil-Jones, Vanuatuan journalist. and political activist.
- Tim Palmer - Record Producer and Mixer
- Paul Stimpson, England and Great Britain Basketball
- Barry Wordsworth, musician, conductor

=== Glyn School ===
- Paul Clement (football coach)
- Jack Cork, England U21 footballer, currently playing at Burnley F.C.
- Paul Hodgson, a scrum-half at London Irish and England Rugby player.
- Paul Smith, ex-goalkeeper for Nottingham Forest F.C.
- Archie White, Professional rugby player for Harlequins.
- Jessie Knight, Olympic Women’s 400m Hurdles for Team GB at the 2020 Summer Olympics and the 2024 Summer Olympics
- Jack Jebb
