= 1998 Australia rugby union tour of Europe =

Summary
P	W	D	L
Total
3	3	0	0
Test match
2	2	0	0
Opponent
P	W	D	L
France
1	1	0	0
England
1	1	0	0

The 1998 Australia rugby union tour of Europe was a series of matches played in November 1998 in Europe by Australia national rugby union team.

== Results ==
Scores and results list Australia's points tally first.

Opposing Team	For	Against	Date	Venue	Status
France A	24	9	17 November 1998	Lille	Tour match
France	32	21	21 November 1998	Stade de France, Saint-Denis	Test match
England	12	11	28 November 1998	Twickenham, London	Test match
