= Paul Hodgson (rugby union) =

England international rugby union player

- Born: Paul Hodgson; 25 April 1982 (age 44) Epsom, Surrey, England
- Height: 1.73 m (5 ft 8 in)
- Weight: 79 kg (12 st 6 lb)
- School: Glyn Technology School

Rugby union career
- Position: Scrum-half
- Current team: London Irish (attack/skills coach)
Youth career
- 1989–2001: Sutton & Epsom
Senior career
Years	Team	Apps	(Points)
2002–2004	Bristol Shoguns		
2004–2012	London Irish	208	(65)
2012–2014	Worcester Warriors	36	(10)
- Correct as of 3 May 2014
International career
Years	Team	Apps	(Points)
	England Saxons	12	(5)
2008–2010	England	9	(0)
- Correct as of 18 June 2011
National sevens team
Years	Team		Comps
- England
Coaching career
- Years: Team
- 2016–2018: London Irish (attack/skills coach)

Paul Hodgson (born 25 April 1982) is an English former rugby union player and coach.

Hodgson played as a Scrum-half and his most recent professional position was attack coach for London Irish. He has since moved on to become director of sport at Cranmore School in West Horsley, Surrey, in September 2018 after completing his MEd, a position previously held by fellow London Irish player Barry Everitt.

== Early career ==
Hodgson attended Glyn Technology School, for whom he captained the rugby 'A' team all through his academic career, and was Head Boy in his final year (2000). Hodgson played for his local rugby club Sutton & Epsom RFC from 1989 to 2001, he represented every age group at the club. Hodgson is a former England Captain at Junior level. He has also represented England at U18s and U21s level as well as playing for England 7s in the IRB World Sevens series.

== Club career ==
=== Bristol Rugby ===
Hodgson has previously played for Bristol Shoguns. Hodgson joined the Bristol academy in the summer of 2001 and made the scrum-half berth his own.

Made the step up to first team level when Agustin Pichot picked up an injury in the early part of 2002 and Hodgson had a number of games on the bench in the Premiership.

After a good U21 World Cup Hodgson pledged his future to the Shoguns in Division one.

Superb against Bedford in the Cup and rightly named Man of the Match and then did not look out of place against Wasps in the Cup.

=== London Irish ===
Hodgson joined London Irish in July 2004 from Bristol Shoguns.

Hodgson was voted London Irish' Most Improved Player of the Season 2005–06. Awarded Player of the Year for the 2008–09 season Same season - Sky Sports Team of the year Awarded Premiership Player of the month for September in 2010–11 season

=== Worcester Warriors ===
Paul joined Worcester Warriors for the 2012–2013 season from London Irish.

== International Rugby ==
Hodgson was an England Sevens international an age group international captain who won 9 caps for the England.

Hodgson was named in the England 2008 Six Nations Championship squad but was not been considered for the opening game due to a shoulder injury.

He was called into the England Saxons squad to face Italy A in Ragusa, Sicily on 9 February 2008.

Having been named in the 2008 season's England Saxons 2008 RBS Six Nations Championship training squad, Hodgson was called into the senior England squad for the game against France and was an unused replacement both in Paris and Edinburgh, before finally making his debut against Ireland in England's 33–10 victory at Twickenham.
