= Renaud Boyoud =

French rugby union player (born 1980)

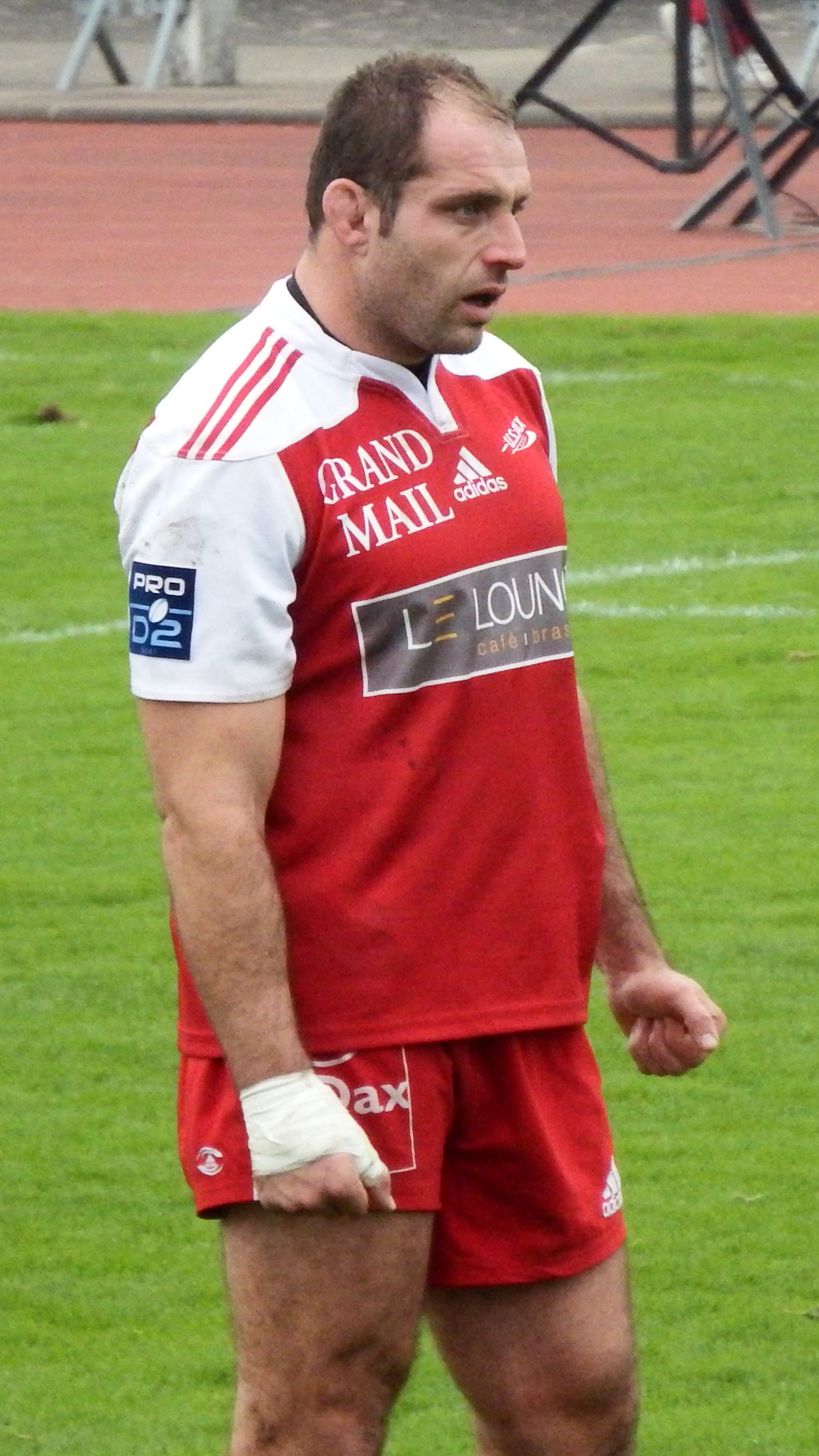
- Born: 7 May 1980 (age 46) Grenoble, France
- Height: 6 ft 3 in (191 cm)
- Weight: 244 lb (111 kg)

Rugby union career
- Position: Prop
International career
Years	Team	Apps	(Points)
2008–09	France	3	(0)

Renaud Boyoud (born 7 May 1980) is a French former rugby union international who represented France in three Test matches. He played most of his club rugby for US Dax and Aviron Bayonnais.

Boyoud, a native of Grenoble, was a prop and made his debut for France in the 2008 tour of Australia. In the first Test in Sydney, Boyoud came on off the bench in the second half, replacing Lionel Faure. A week later in Brisbane he earned a starting berth and was cited for striking James Horwill, for which he received a three-week suspension. He also featured in the 2009 Six Nations Test against Scotland at Stade de France.

== See also ==
- List of France national rugby union players
