= 1997 France rugby union tour of Romania and Australia =

Summary
P	W	D	L
Total
6	3	0	3
Test match
3	1	0	2
Opponent
P	W	D	L
Romania
1	1	0	0
Australia
2	0	0	2

== Matches ==
Scores and results list France's points tally first.

Opposing team	For	Against	Date	Venue	Status
Romania	51	20	1 June 1997	St. Dinamo, Bucharest	Test match
ACT XV	31	22	13 June 1997	Canberra	Tour match
Queensland	34	24	17 June 1997	Ballymore, Brisbane	Tour match
Australia	15	29	21 June 1997	Football Stadium, Sydney	Test match
Australian Barbarians	24	26	24 June 1997	Topper Stadium, Newcastle	Tour match
Australia	19	26	28 June 1997	Ballymore, Brisbane	Test match
