= 1993 Australia rugby union tour =

Summary
P	W	D	L
Total
11	9	0	2
Test match
3	2	0	1
Opponent
P	W	D	L
United States
1	1	0	0
Canada
1	1	0	0
France
2	1	0	1

The 1993 Australia rugby union tour was a series of matches played in October and November 1993 in the United States, Canada and France by the Australia national rugby union team.

== Results ==
Scores and results list Australia's points tally first.

Opposing Team	For	Against	Date	Venue	Status
United States	26	22	2 October 1993	Riverside	Tour match
Canada A	40	3	6 October 1993	Kingsland, Calgary	Tour match
Canada	43	16	9 October 1993	Kingsland, Calgary	Test match
Aquitaine	30	15	16 October 1993	Stade Boyau, Dax	Tour match
Sud Ouest	20	19	21 October 1993	St. Armandie, Agen	Tour match
Languedoc-Roussilon	35	18	23 October 1993	Parc des Sports, Narbonne	Tour match
Sud Est	24	23	26 October 1993	Stade Lesdiguières, Grenoble	Tour match
France	13	16	30 October 1993	Parc Lescure, Bordeaux	Test match
Provence-Litoral	15	21	2 November 1993	Stade Mayol, Toulon	Tour match
France	24	3	6 November 1993	Parc des Princes, Paris	Test match
French Barbarians	43	26	11 November 1993	Stade Marcel-Michelin, Clermont-Ferrand	Tour match
