= Sébastien Tillous-Borde =

French rugby union player (born 1985)

- Born: Sébastien Tillous-Borde; 29 April 1985 (age 41) Oloron-Sainte-Marie, France
- Height: 1.76 m (5 ft 9 1/2 in)
- Weight: 87 kg (13 st 10 lb)

Rugby union career
- Position: Scrum-half
- Current team: Montauban (manager)
Senior career
Years	Team	Apps	(Points)
2005–2007	Biarritz	7	(0)
2007–2011	Castres	77	(30)
2011–2018	Toulon	153	(60)
International career
Years	Team	Apps	(Points)
2006	France U21	4	(5)
2008–2015	France	19	(15)
Coaching career
- Years: Team
- 2018–2020: Toulon (backs)
- 2021–2023: Bourgoin-Jallieu
- 2023–2024: Rouen
- 2024–: Montauban

Sébastien Tillous-Borde (born 29 April 1985) is a former French rugby union player. He played scrum-half for his club rugby with Toulon after signing from Castres in 2011. He is currently the manager of Top 14 side Montauban.

== Career ==
Tillous-Borde began his professional career in 2005 while playing for Biarritz in the Top 14. Haven been second or sometimes third and fourth choice in his position, first choice being held by Dimitri Yachvili, he signed with Castres for the 2007–08 Top 14 season. He debuted for Castres on 27 October 2007 against Auch in what was a 25–12 victory. Cast went on to finish 5th that season, with Sébastien playing in 21 matches. In June 2008, he was selected for the France national side for the 2008 tour to Australia. Where he made his debut in the opening test on 28 June, coming on for Yachvili on the 60th minute. France lost 34–13. The following week he earned his first start, where he played almost the full match, being replaced on the 79th minute by Yachvili. He continued to play for France in 2009, but injury during the 2009–10 Top 14 season in October 2009, ruled him out for most of the season. He returned to action the following season, before signing to play for Toulon in the 2011–12 Top 14 season.

Tillous-Borde made his Toulon debut on 27 August 2011 against one of his former clubs Biarritz, with Toulon winning 30–5. He helped guide Toulon to third in the regular season, making it all the way to the final against Toulouse, who were the victors that day, winning 18–12. He continued to develop into an attacking threat in the 2012–13 Top 14 season, again being a key figure on the park. He made a threatening half-back partnership with Jonny Wilkinson and both players guided Toulon to the Top 14 and the 2013 Heineken Cup Final. He was a key figure on the park during the Heineken Cup Final, beating Clermont 16–15 at the Aviva Stadium in Dublin. However, they lost the following week to Tillous-Borde's previous club Castres, losing 19–14. The following year, Tillous-Borde went on to retain the Heineken Cup Title, and win the 2013–14 Top 14 season title. His form was recognised and he returned to the French squad for the 2014 end-of-year rugby union internationals, where France beat Fiji and Australia, but lost to Argentina in the final week. Tillous-Borde started in all three matches, making a formidable half-back partnership with Clermont Fly Half Camille Lopez.
