= Ignacio Fernández Rouyet =

Italy international rugby union player

Ignacio Fernandez Rouyet
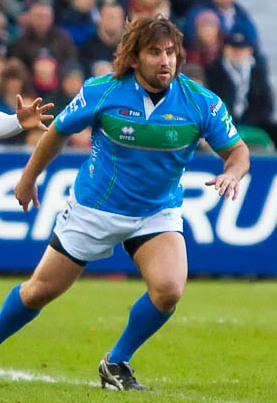
- Born: Ignacio Fernandez Rouyet; 22 October 1978 (age 48) Buenos Aires, Argentina
- Height: 1.80 m (5 ft 11 in)
- Weight: 110 kg (243 lb)

Rugby union career
- Position: Prop
Senior career
Years	Team	Apps	(Points)
2004−2005	L'Aquila		
2005−2009	Viadana	65	(10)
2009−2014	Benetton Treviso	110	(0)
2015−2016	Mogliano	31	(0)
- Correct as of 2016
International career
Years	Team	Apps	(Points)
2008−2011	Italy	7	(0)

Ignacio Fernandez Rouyet (born 22 October 1978 in Buenos Aires) is an Argentina-born Italian former rugby union player.

Rouyet, who played as a prop, played for Rugby Viadana before signing for Benetton Treviso in 2009. He made his debut for Italy against South Africa in Cape Town on 21 June 2008, and was among several Argentine-born players in the Italy side of that period. He finished his playing career with Mogliano in 2016.
