= 2000 Australia rugby union tour =

Summary
P	W	D	L
Total
4	3	0	1
Test match
3	2	0	1
Opponent
P	W	D	L
France
1	1	0	0
Scotland
1	1	0	0
England
1	0	0	1

The 2000 Australia rugby union tour of Japan and Europe was a series of matches played in October and November 2000 in Japan and Europe by Australia national rugby union team.

== Results ==
Scores and results list Australia's points tally first.

Opposing Team	For	Against	Date	Venue	Status
Japanese President's XV	64	13	28 October 2000	Tokyo	Tour match
France	18	13	4 November 2000	Stade de France, Paris	Test Match
Scotland	30	9	11 November 2000	Murrayfield, Edinburgh	Test Match
England	19	22	18 November 2000	Twickenham, London	Test Match
