= Pierre Corréia =

France international rugby union player (born 1983)

- Born: 4 December 1983 (age 42) Talence, France
- Height: 1.80 m (5 ft 11 in)
- Weight: 107 kg (236 lb)

Rugby union career
- Position: Loosehead prop
- Current team: Albi
Senior career
Years	Team	Apps	(Points)
2005–2008	Albi	42	(5)
2008–2009	Stade Français	17	(0)
2009–	Albi	14	(0)
- Correct as of 1 March 2010
International career
Years	Team	Apps	(Points)
2008	France	1	(0)
- Correct as of 1 March 2010

Pierre Corréia (born 4 December 1983) is a French rugby union player. Corréia, who is a loosehead prop, plays for Albi in the Top 14. His only game for France was against Australia on 5 July 2008.

Corréia began his professional career at Albi in 2005, but was forced to leave the club following their relegation at the end of the 2007–08 season. Having been named in the French squad for the 2008 mid-year rugby test series, Corréia was targeted by most of the Top 14 clubs. He chose to move to Stade Français, but, following a virus early in the season, he struggled for form and fitness throughout his time at the club. He returned to Albi, who had regained their Top 14 status, prior to the 2009–10 Top 14 season.
