= 2010 Churchill Cup =

Tournament information
- Date: 5 June – 19 June 2010
- Venue(s): Red Bull Arena, Harrison, New Jersey
- Teams: 6

Final positions
- Champion: England Saxons (5th title)
- Runner-up: Canada

Tournament statistics
- Matches played: 9

The 2010 Churchill Cup, the eighth edition of an annual international rugby union tournament, was taking place in the Denver and New York City metropolitan areas. This was the second consecutive year in which Denver was a host city, and the third in a row for the competition to be held in the United States.

== Competitors ==
The three regular participants in the event — the senior national sides of the USA and Canada, and England's "A" (second-level) national side, the England Saxons — were joined by three first-time competitors:

- France A
- Russia (senior side)
- Uruguay (senior side)

== Format ==
The teams played in a round-robin format between two pools to decide the elimination matches. All six teams participated on the finals day: the two pool winners competed in the Cup Final, the two runners-up played in a Plate Final, and the two bottom-placed teams met in the Bowl Final.

== Venues ==
After the 2008 tournament, which was played both in Canada and the United States, in 2009 all rounds of the tournament as well as the Finals Day were played around the Denver, Colorado area which was the future home for the tournament until the 2012 edition. The first three days of round-robin play were at the modern, purpose-built rugby stadium Infinity Park in Glendale, Colorado on the south side of Denver. For the first time in the tournament's history the finals were held at Red Bull Arena in Harrison, New Jersey, which is home to New York's MLS team, the New York Red Bulls.

== Fixtures and results ==
=== Pool stage ===
==== Pool A ====
Place	Nation	Games				Points			Bonus points	Table points
Place	Nation	Played	Won	Drawn	Lost	For	Against	Difference	Bonus points	Table points
1	Canada	2	2	0	0	81	33	+48	1	9
2	France A	2	1	0	1	70	43	+27	2	6
3	Uruguay	2	0	0	2	16	91	−75	0	0

June 5, 2010
1 PM (MDT)

Uruguay	6 – 48	Canada
	Report

Infinity Park, Glendale, CO
Referee: Jérôme Garces (France)

June 9, 2010
5:30 PM (MDT)

Uruguay	10 – 43	France A
	Report

Infinity Park, Glendale, CO
Referee: Chris Henshall (United States)

June 13, 2010
3:30 PM (MDT)

France A	27 – 33	Canada
	Report

Infinity Park, Glendale, CO
Referee: Chris Pollock (New Zealand)

==== Pool B ====
Place	Nation	Games				Points			Bonus points	Table points
Place	Nation	Played	Won	Drawn	Lost	For	Against	Difference	Bonus points	Table points
1	England A	2	2	0	0	81	26	+55	2	10
2	United States	2	1	0	1	48	54	−6	1	5
3	Russia	2	0	0	2	39	88	−49	0	0

June 5, 2010
3:30 PM (MDT)

Russia	22 – 39	United States
	Report

Infinity Park, Glendale, CO
Referee: Chris Pollock (New Zealand)

June 9, 2010
3 PM (MDT)

Russia	17 – 49	England A
	Report

Infinity Park, Glendale, CO
Referee: Carlo Damasco (Italy)

June 13, 2010
1 PM (MDT)

England Saxons	32 – 9	United States
	Report

Infinity Park, Glendale, CO
Referee: Jérôme Garces (France)

=== Finals ===
==== Bowl final ====
June 19, 2010
12 noon (EDT)

Uruguay	19 – 38	Russia
	Report

Red Bull Arena, Harrison, NJ

==== Plate final ====
June 19, 2010
5:30 pm (EDT)

United States	10 – 24	France A

Red Bull Arena, Harrison, NJ

==== Cup final ====
June 19, 2010
2:45 pm (EDT)

England Saxons	38 – 18	Canada
	Report

Red Bull Arena, Harrison, NJ

== See also ==
- Churchill Cup

Preceded by Churchill Cup; 2009	Churchill Cup; 2010	Succeeded by Churchill Cup; 2011
