= Mickaël Forest =

French rugby union player (born 1975)

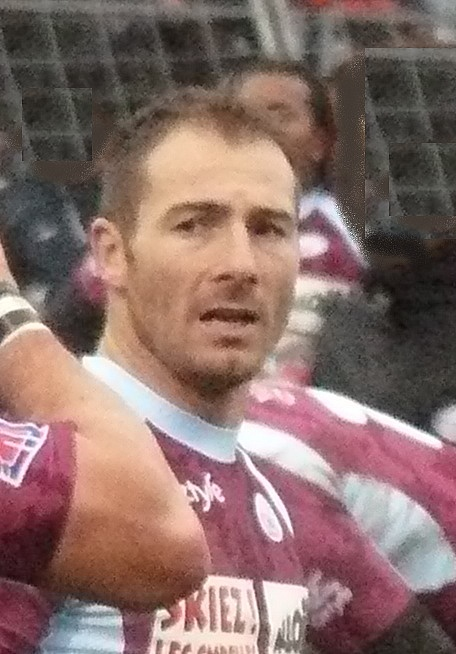
- Born: 9 August 1975 (age 51) Chambéry, France
- Height: 1.79 m (5 ft 10 in)
- Weight: 83 kg (13 st 12 lb)

Rugby union career
- Position: Scrum-half
Senior career
Years	Team	Apps	(Points)
1999-2001	CA Brive	17	(10)
2001-2012	CS Bourgoin-Jallieu	206	(95)
- Correct as of 2007-06-02
International career
Years	Team	Apps	(Points)
2007	France	2	(0)
- Correct as of 2007-06-12

Mickaël Forest (born 9 August 1975 in Chambéry, France) is a French rugby union footballer. Forest plays scrum-half for CS Bourgoin-Jallieu in France's Top 14 championship. His professional career started with CA Brive in 1999. He played with them for two years that included ten Challenge Cup matches. After Brive were relegated to Pro D2 for the 2001/2002 season Forest moved to Bourgoin. With Bourgoin Forrest played in the final of the 2003 Challenge Yves du Manoir (which was lost), and has played in 18 Heineken Cup matches. He was selected for France in their 2007 Tour to New Zealand. He made his Test debut against the All Blacks on 2 June 2007 when he came on as a substitute in the 74th minute. He made his second appearance the following week, this time coming on in the 67th minute.
