= Benoît Lecouls =

France international rugby union player (born 1978)

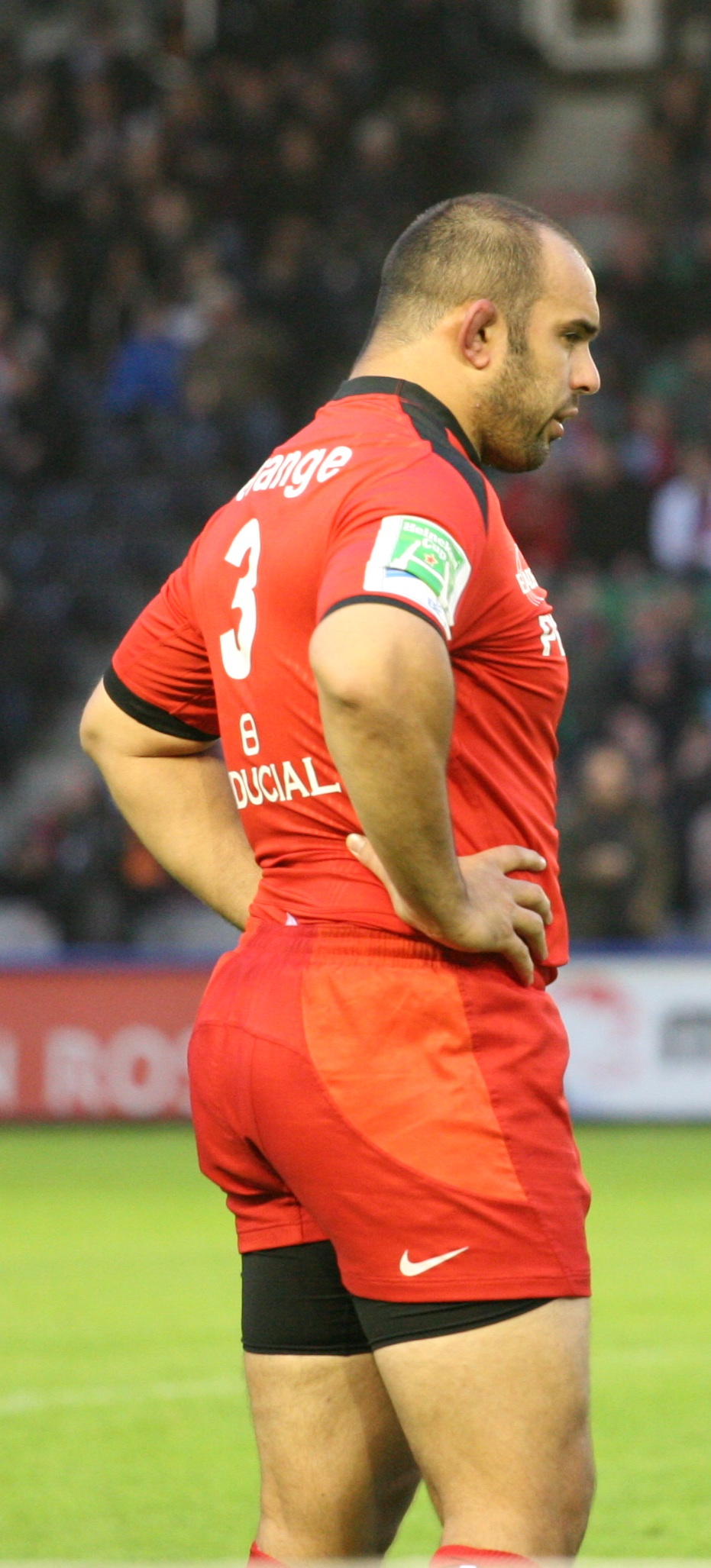
- Born: 22 March 1978 (age 48) Agen
- Height: 6 ft 1 in (1.85 m)
- Weight: 242 lb (110 kg; 17 st 4 lb)

Rugby union career
- Position: Prop
Senior career
Years	Team	Apps	(Points)
2000-2002	SU Agen		
2002-2004	Toulouse		
2004-2008	Biarritz Olympique		
2008-11	Toulouse		
2011-12	Stade Rochelais		
International career
Years	Team	Apps	(Points)
2008-2009	France	6	

Benoît Lecouls (born 22 March 1978, in Agen) is a French rugby union footballer. He played for Biarritz Olympique in the Top 14 competition during the 2007/08 season, but has transferred back to Stade Toulousain during the close season. He usually plays as a prop. Prior to playing with Biarritz, Lecouls played for Toulouse and SU Agen. He has also played for the French national team, earning his first cap on 28 June 2008 against Australia.

Across his two spells at Toulouse he won the Heineken Cup twice in 2003 and 2010.
