= Tommaso Reato =

- Born: Tommaso Reato; 12 May 1984 (age 42) Rovigo, Italy
- Height: 6 ft 5 in (1.96 m)
- Weight: 16 st 0 lb (102 kg)

Rugby union career
- Position: Lock
- Current team: Rugby Rovigo
Senior career
Years	Team	Apps	(Points)
- Rugby Rovigo
International career
Years	Team	Apps	(Points)
2008-	Italy	9	(0)
–	Italy A		

Tommaso Reato (born 12 May 1984) is an Italian rugby union player.

Reato was born in Rovigo, and plays for Rugby Rovigo in the Top12. Reato's position of choice is at Lock.

He was called up to the Italy squad for the 2008 Six Nations Championship.
