= Thibault Lacroix =

French rugby union player (born 1985)

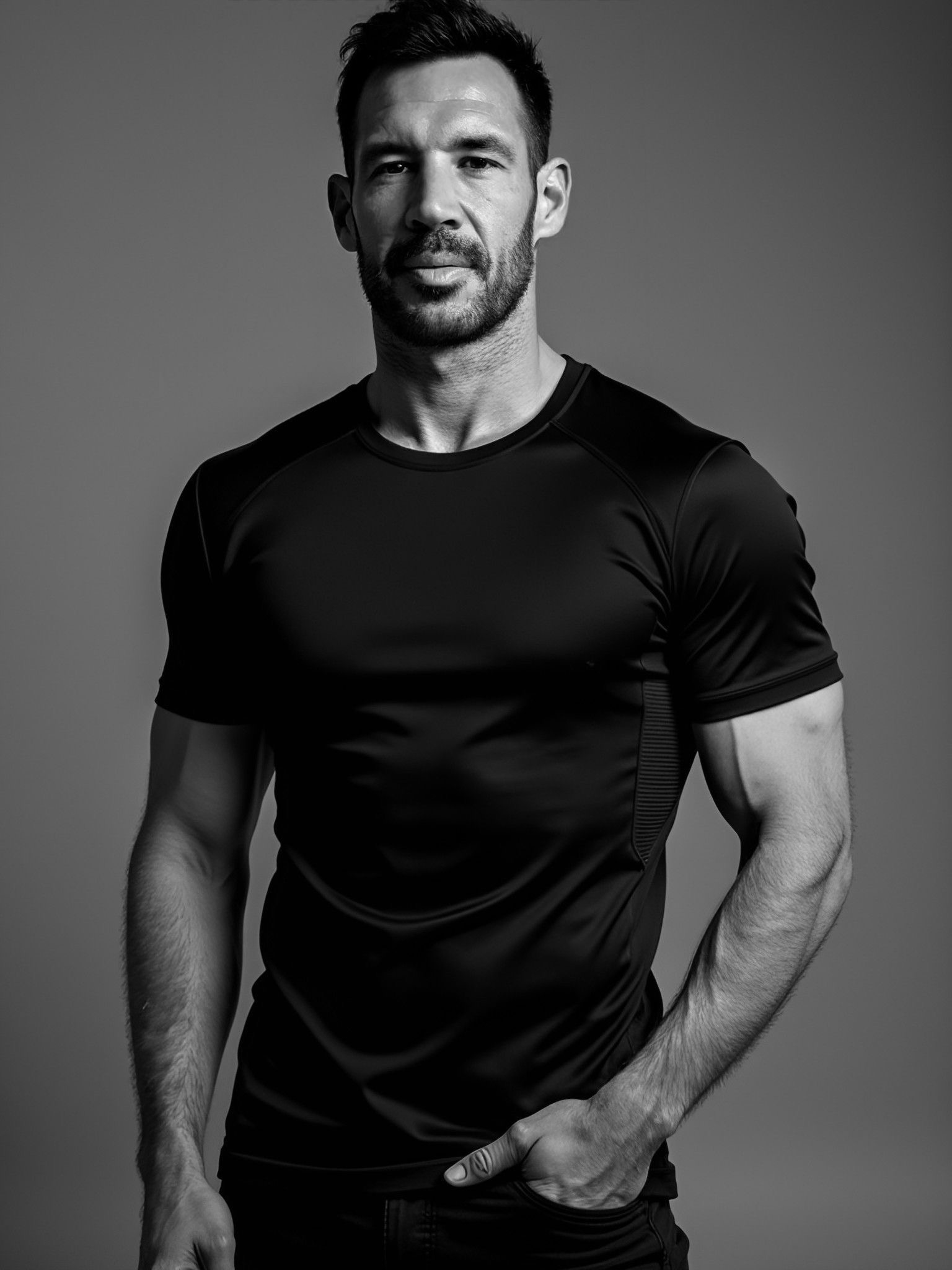
- Born: 14 May 1985 (age 41) Niort, France
- Height: 1.93 m (6 ft 4 in)
- Weight: 103 kg (227 lb)

Rugby union career
- Position: Centre
Senior career
Years	Team	Apps	(Points)
-2005	Biarritz	32	(50)
2005–2007	Stade Français	15	(10)
2008–2009	Albi	28	(10)
2009–2018	Bayonne	80	(40)
- Correct as of 28 February 2011
International career
Years	Team	Apps	(Points)
2008–	France	2	(0)
- Correct as of 28 February 2011

Thibault Lacroix (born 14 May 1985) is a French rugby union player. Lacroix, who is a centre, plays his club rugby for Bayonne. He made his debut for France against Australia on 28 June 2008.
