= Lionel Mazars =

French rugby union player (born 1984)

- Born: 26 June 1984 (age 42) Toulouse, France
- Height: 1.83 m (6 ft 0 in)
- Weight: 90 kg (198 lb)

Rugby union career
- Position: Centre
Senior career
Years	Team	Apps	(Points)
2004–2005	Toulouse	1	(0)
2005–2007	RC Narbonne	54	(25)
2007–2009	Castres	48	(35)
2009–2013	Bayonne	84	(35)
2013–	Agen	70	(43)
- Correct as of 8 May 2016
International career
Years	Team	Apps	(Points)
2007-	France	2	(0)
- Correct as of 1 December 2011

Lionel Mazars (born 26 June 1984 in Toulouse, France) is a French rugby union footballer. He mainly plays at inside and outside centre.

His professional career started at Toulouse in the Top 16's 2004-2005 season. He only made one appearance for the club however and moved to RC Narbonne for the 2005-2006 season. With Narbonne he played 26 matches in his first season – including five appearances in the European Challenge Cup. He stayed with the club for the 2006-2007 season, and made another 28 appearances, including five more Challenge Cup appearances.

He was selected for France in their 2007 Tour to New Zealand. He made his debut on 9 June 2007 against the All Blacks.
