= Benjamin Thiéry =

French rugby union player (born 1984)

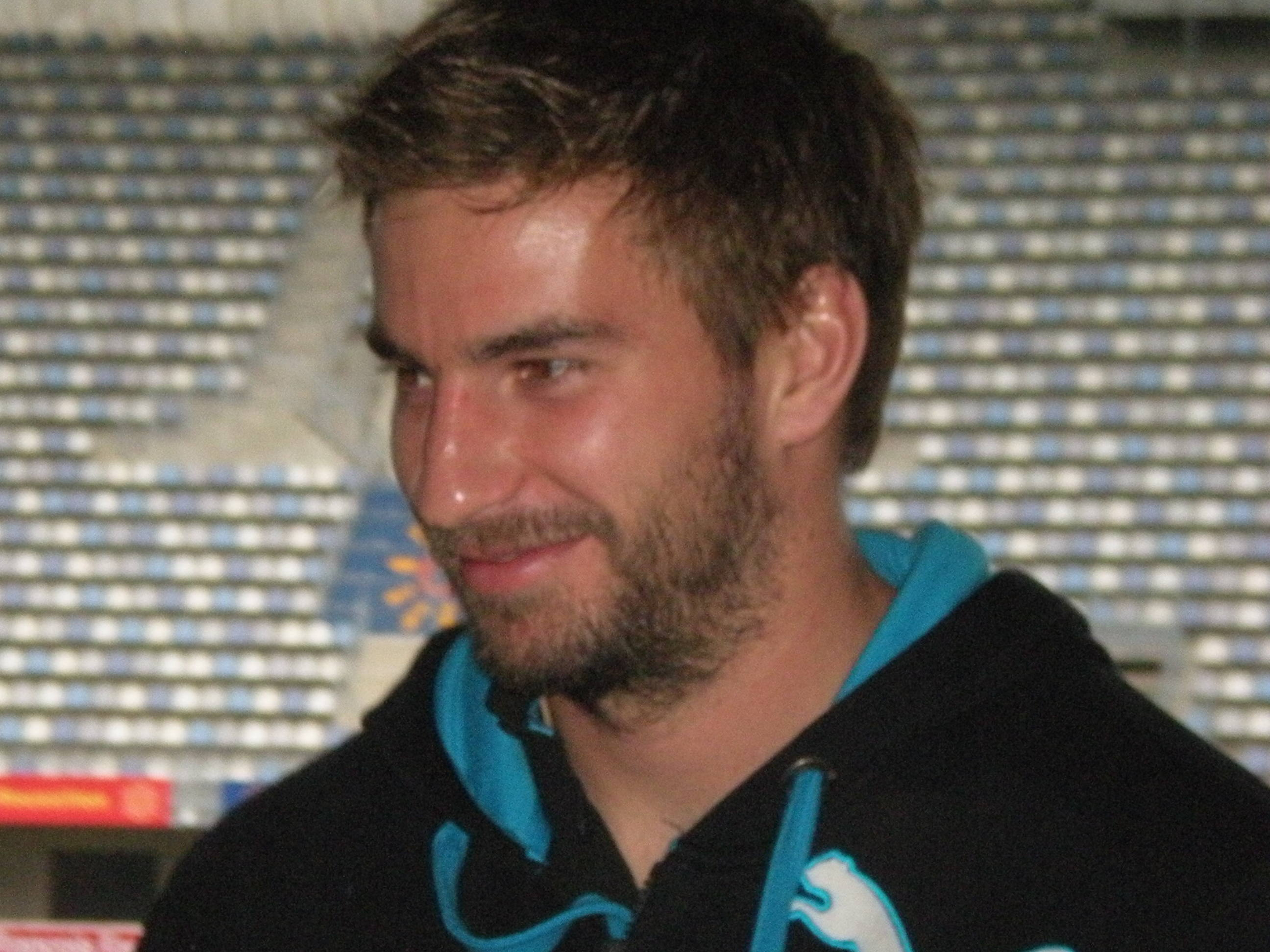
- Born: February 6, 1984 (age 42) Reims
- Height: 6 ft 1 in (1.85 m)
- Weight: 198 lb (90 kg)

Rugby union career
- Position: Fullback
Senior career
Years	Team	Apps	(Points)
2002–2003	Pau		
2003–2004	Colomiers		
2004–2007	Bayonne		
2007–2009	Biarritz		
2009–2013	Montpellier		
2013–2015	Grenoble		
2015–2019	Bayonne		
International career
Years	Team	Apps	(Points)
2007	France	4	(0)

Benjamin Thiéry (born 6 February 1984) is a French former rugby union player.

He has played for the Section Paloise, US Colomiers, Biarritz, Montpellier, Grenoble and Bayonne clubs, and he was also included in France's mid-year Test squad for 2007.
