= List of people educated at Shawnigan Lake School =

A list of notable alumni and staff affiliated with Shawnigan Lake School, Vancouver Island, British Columbia, Canada. This list alumni known within fields including artists, athletes, broadcasters, businesspeople, musicians, actors, politicians, scholars, and scientists.

== Artists ==
- Mark Hobson - Artist
- Robert Stewart Hyndman – Artist
- Peter Saul – Artist
- Brendan Tang - Visual Artist, Judge on The Great Canadian Pottery Throw Down

== Athletes ==
- Eloise Blackwell – New Zealand Black Ferns captain (46 caps)
- Brett Beukeboom – Rugby Canada captain (32 caps) and Cornish Pirates player
- Hannah Darling – 2016 Olympic bronze medalist, 2015 Pan American Games gold medalist, Rugby Canada player
- Bryan Donnelly – Team Canada rower, 2000 Olympic Games
- Eddie Evans – Rugby Canada player, prop for Canada national team, 1987, 1991, 1995 Rugby World Cups (50 caps)
- George Hungerford – 1964 Olympic gold medalist for Team Canada in the coxless pair
- Josh Jackson – Rugby Canada player (22 caps)
- John Lander – 1928 Olympic gold medalist for Great Britain in the coxless four
- John Lecky – 1960 Olympic silver medalist, eight
- Kristopher McDaniel – 2005 & 2007 World Championship bronze medalist, coxless four and pair
- Djustice Sears-Duru – Rugby Canada player (67 caps)

== Business ==
- Jim Shaw – CEO of Shaw Communications

== Diplomats ==
- Anthony Vincent – Canadian Ambassador to Peru
- M. John Sloan - Canadian Ambassador to Russia, Uzbekistan and Armenia

== Entertainment ==
- Jon Kimura Parker – Officer of the Order of Canada, concert pianist
- Mike Little - Juno Award-winning musician
- Noah Mills - Model
- Tara Spencer-Nairn – Actress, Corner Gas

== Military ==
- Rear Admiral Richard H. Leir – Royal Canadian Navy
- Rear Admiral Michael G. Stirling – Royal Canadian Navy
- Lt.-Commander Cornelius Burke - Royal Canadian Navy
- Lt.-Commander T.E. Ladner - Royal Canadian Navy
- Lt.-Commander Douglas Maitland - Royal Canadian Navy

== Politics ==
- The Hon. Henry Pybus Bell-Irving – 23rd Lieutenant Governor of British Columbia
- The Hon. Stephen D. Owen – Federal cabinet minister and Member of Parliament
- The Hon. Nicholas Milliken – Alberta Minister of Infrastructure and Member of the Legislative Assembly
- Robert Murdoch - Private Secretary to Prime Minister Pierre Trudeau
- Peter Ladner – Vancouver City Councillor

== Scholars and scientists ==
- Graham Anderson – Scholar
- Dr. Barry F. Cooper – Political Scientist
- Dr. Steve Deering – Computer Scientist
- Dr. Roger Stanier – Microbiologist

== Notable staff ==
- Tom Brierley – Cricketer
- Nicholas Coghlan - Canadian Ambassador to South Sudan
- Jennifer Manuel – Author, winner of the Ethel Wilson Fiction Prize (2017) and Geist Literal Literary Postcard Story Contest (2025), shortlisted for the 2025 CBC Poetry Prize
- James Robertson Justice – Actor
- Laura Russell - Canadian national team rugby player
- Leonard Wilde - Educator, Founder of Neuchâtel Junior College
- Jeff Williams - Canadian national team rugby player
