= Andrew Bibby =

Andrew Bibby may refer to:

- Andrew Bibby (actor) (born 1980), Australian actor who played Lance Wilkinson on Neighbours.
- Andrew Bibby (rugby union) (born 1957), Canadian international rugby union player.
