= Chris Lonsdale =

Chris Lonsdale or Christopher Lonsdale may refer to:

- Chris Lonsdale (cricketer) (born 1987), former Bermudian cricketer and footballer
- Chris Lonsdale (politician), American legislator from Missouri
- Christopher Lonsdale (1886-1952), founder and first headmaster of Shawnigan Lake School in Shawnigan Lake, British Columbia
