= Shawnigan Lake School =

Location
- 1975 Renfrew Road; Shawnigan Lake, British Columbia, V8H 2G7; Canada; 48.6573°N 123.6390°W

Information
- School type: Private boarding and day
- Motto: Palmam Qui Meruit Ferat (Let whoever has deserved the palm bear it)
- Founded: 1916
- Headmaster: Richard 'Larry' Lamont
- Staff: 250
- Grades: 8–12
- Enrollment: 550
- Language: English
- Colours: Black and gold
- Mascot: The Stag
- Endowment: CA$32,000,000
- Website: www.shawnigan.ca
- Last updated: March 17, 2026

Shawnigan Lake School is an independent and co-educational boarding school located in Shawnigan Lake, British Columbia, Canada. The school was founded in 1916 by Christopher Lonsdale, and partly modelled after his alma mater, the Westminster School in London, England.

Originally an all-boys' school, it became fully co-educational in 1988. The school has produced many notable alumni, including several artists, athletes, diplomats, politicians, scientists, and businesspeople.

Lonsdale chose Horatio Nelson's motto, Palmam Qui Meruit Ferat ("Let whosoever deserves the palm bear it") as the school's motto.

== Students ==
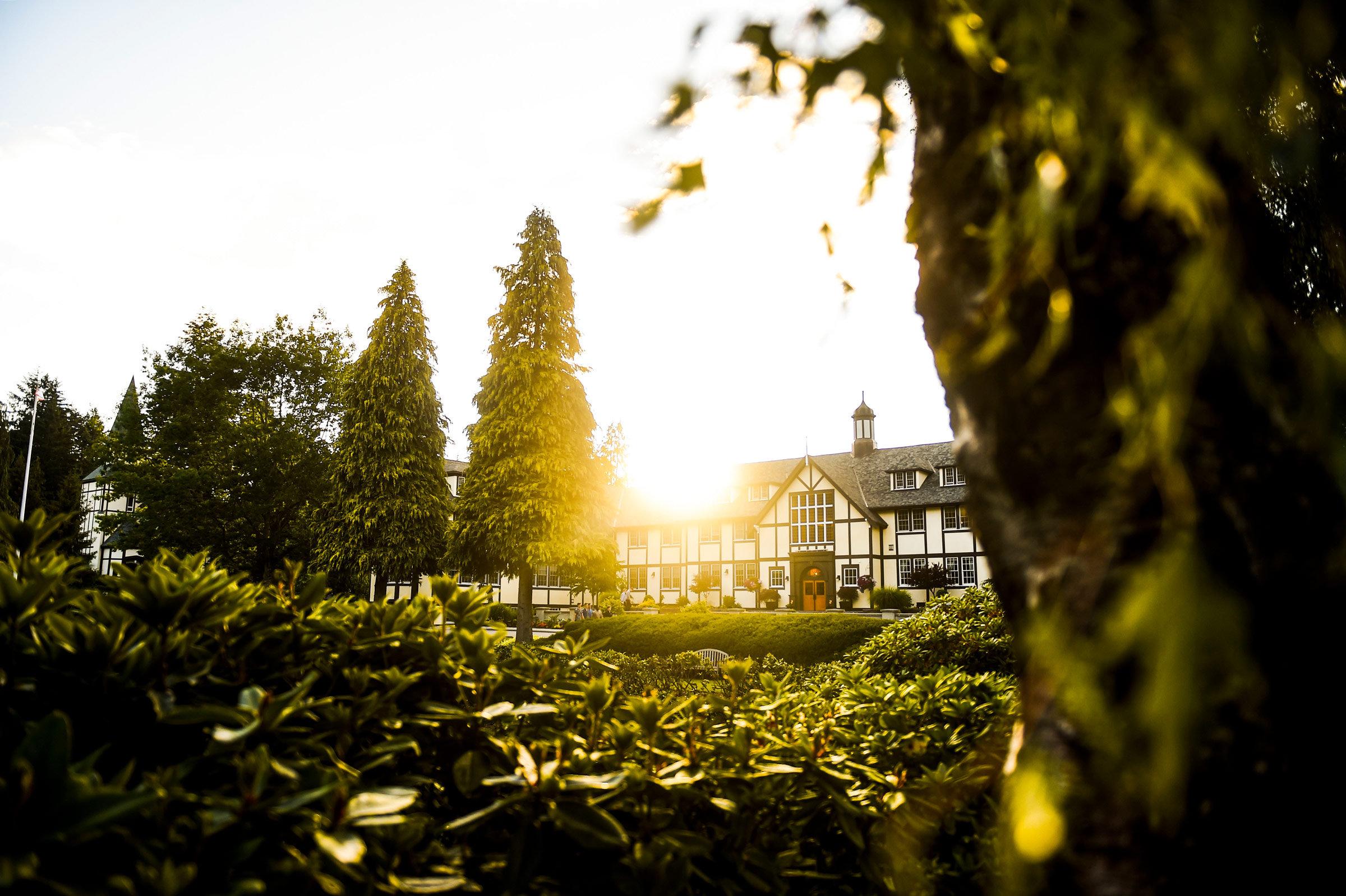
Shawnigan Lake School

As of September 2025, the student body at Shawnigan Lakes School consists of 540 students representing 30 countries, with 440 students residing on campus in boarding houses, the largest number of full-time boarders in Canada. Students come from all over the world, with 50 percent from British Columbia, 15 percent from other Canadian provinces, 5 percent from the United States, and 30 percent from other international locations. Shawnigan sets aside $6 million for financial aid and scholarships every year.

== Current campus ==
Shawnigan Lake School occupies a wooded 270-acre (1.1 km^{2}) campus near the village of Shawnigan Lake, British Columbia. There are approximately 80 buildings on the site:

The Main Building, built in 1926, sits adjacent to the quadrangle, which houses the school's chapel (built 1928), dining hall (Marion Hall), and the Bruce-Lockhart Centre for Creativity (built 1934, formerly the Hobbies Building). Other facilities include classroom buildings, dormitories and staff housing, a theatre, a music building, an astronomy observatory, a recording arts studio, a growing dome, a salmon hatchery, and a robotics lab.

Athletic facilities include the Charlie Purdey Arena for ice hockey and figure skating, a rowing crewhouse shared with Rowing Canada Aviron, the Hyde-Lay Rugby Pavilion, two gymnasiums, six tennis courts, eight squash courts, and seven sports fields, including Canada Field, often used by Rugby Canada and other international teams.

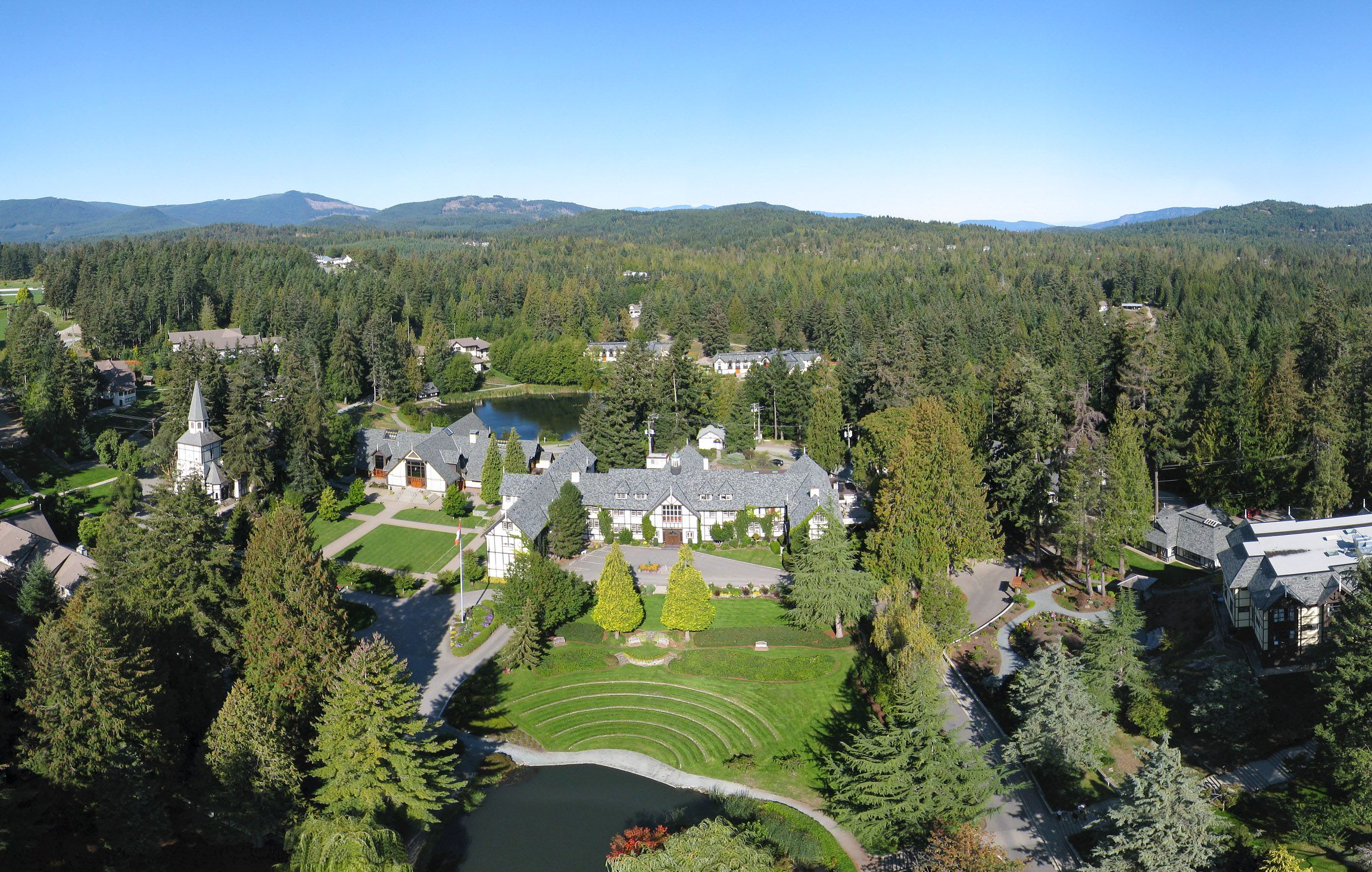
Shawnigan Lake School Campus

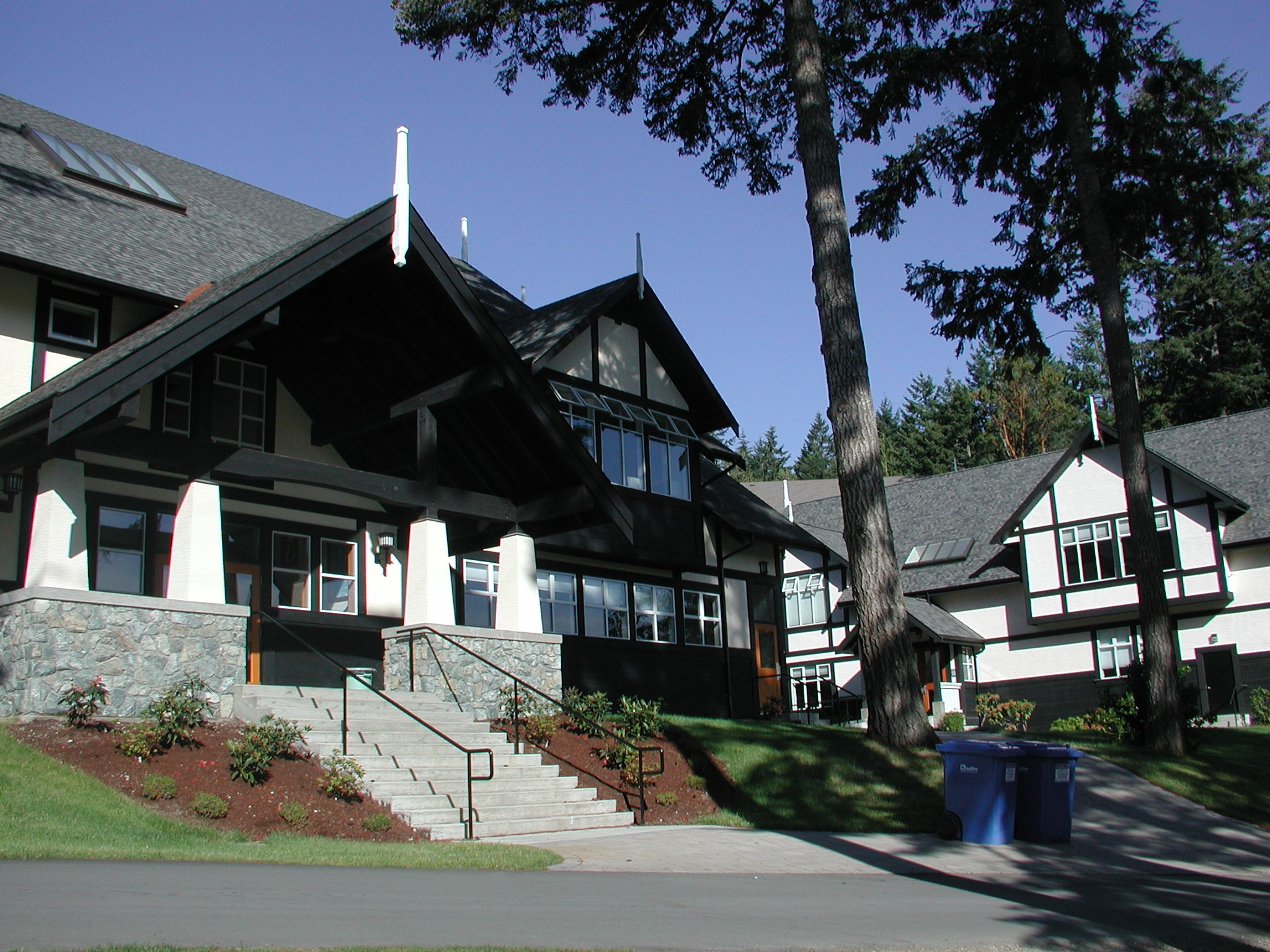
Shawnigan Lake School's Olsen and Craig buildings

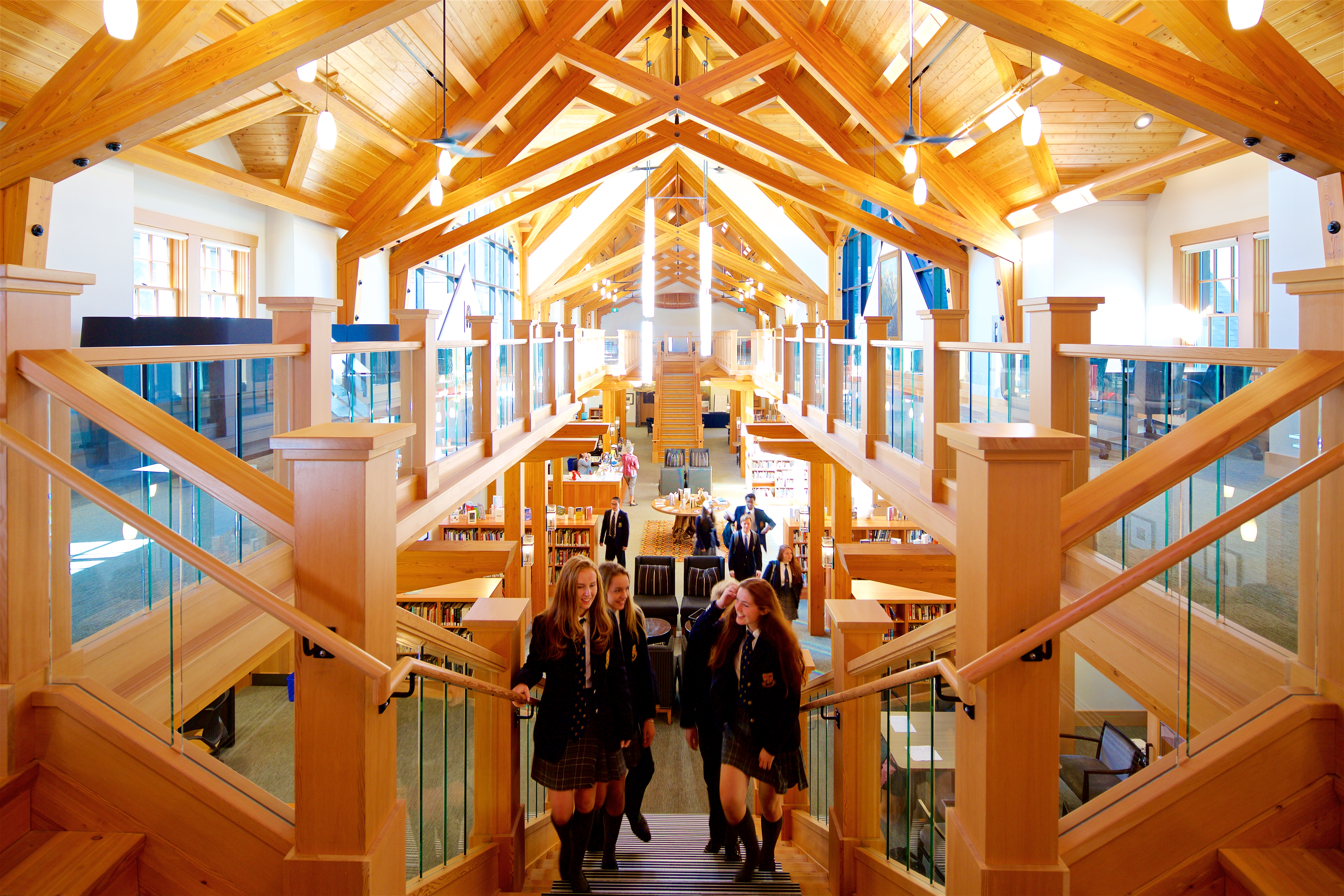
Shawnigan Lake School's Jim and Kathryn Shaw Library

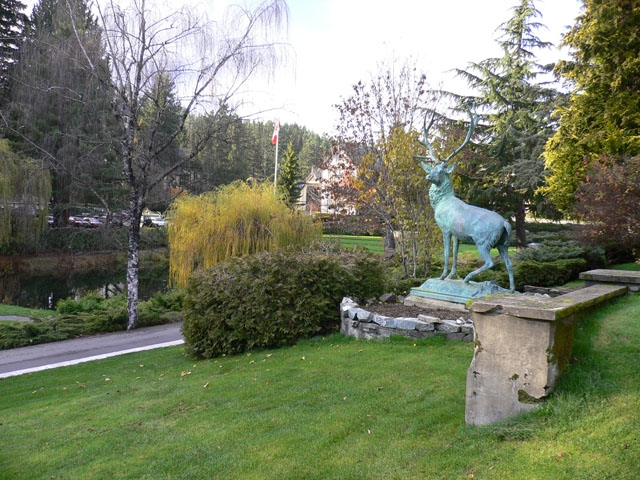
Shawnigan Lake School's Stag Statue

== School life ==
=== Student Body & Boarding Houses ===
The school is primarily a boarding school, with approximately 82 percent of its students attending the school as boarders. The school has 10 boarding houses: five for boys in grades 9-12 and four for girls in grades 9-12, as well as Samuel House, a dedicated Grade 8 boarding house with separate wings for boys and girls, which opened in 2024. Each boarding house has a full-time House Director and an Assistant House Director, who are assisted by other staff members, along with student Heads of House and House Prefects in the management of house duties and issues. Each year, houses compete against each other in an annual intramural competition for the House Cup, determined by a variety of events throughout the year as well as academic achievement.

Shawnigan's student government consists of Round Tables from Grades 8 to 11, with the highest position of student leadership being School Prefects, who are appointed in their final year. The Prefects are led by the Co-Heads of School, who are elected from within the incoming Prefect group at the end of each academic year.

Boy Houses:

- Lake's House (1927)
- Ripley's House (1927)
- Copeman's House (1929)
- Lonsdale's House (1968)
- Duxbury House (1999)

Girl Houses:

- Groves' House (1927)
- Kaye's House (1989)
- Renfrew House (1996)
- Strathcona House (2007)

Co-Ed (Grade 8):

- Samuel House (2024)

=== Academics ===
Shawnigan's academic program is university preparatory. It was ranked by the Fraser Institute in 2017 as 11th out of 253 British Columbian Secondary Schools based on a score of 9.3/10 for academic achievements. The school provides 25 Advanced Placement (AP) courses offered by the College Board, as well as a Dual Dogwood Diploma program for French Immersion students.

=== Fine Arts ===
Students are required to try a variety of fine arts and activities, known as the 360 program, selecting from a list of 30 or more options.

Notable programs include recording arts, robotics, musicals, Model United Nations, astronomy, woodworking, search and rescue, and various bands and music groups. The theatre program includes at least one large-scale production each year, which is usually performed at the McPherson Playhouse in Victoria.

=== Athletics ===
Shawnigan has official partnerships with Rugby Canada and Rowing Canada, with both national teams using the school's training facilities on a regular basis. The school also has a partnership with Thunder Indigenous Rugby. In 2014, Shawnigan joined the Canadian Sport School Hockey League.

Sports offered at the school include rowing, rugby, ice hockey, squash, tennis, badminton, basketball, soccer, golf, volleyball, field hockey, and cross country.

Shawnigan's sports rivalries include those with Brentwood College School, St. George's School, and St. Michaels University School.

== Headmasters ==
Year	Name
1916–1952	C. W. Lonsdale
1952–1958	G. Peter Kaye
1958–1967	Edward R. 'Ned' Larsen
1967–1968	Lachlan Patrick 'Pat' MacLachlan, acting
1968	Brian S. Powell
1968–1972	Lachlan Patrick 'Pat' MacLachlan
1972	The Rev. Canon William Hamilton Horace McClelland, M.B.E., acting
1972–1975	Hugh C. Wilkinson
1975–1978	The Rev. Canon William Hamilton Horace McClelland, M.B.E.
1978–1983	Darrell John Farrant
1983–1984	Derek William Hyde-Lay, acting
1984–1989	Douglas J. 'Doug' Campbell
1989–1990	Derek William Hyde-Lay
1990–2000	Simon C. Bruce-Lockhart
2000–2018	David Robertson
2018–Present	Richard 'Larry' Lamont

== School athletic championships ==
=== Rowing ===		
2013	Canadian Champions	Jr. Men's Eight
		Jr. Men's Coxed Four
2011	Canadian Champions	Sr. Men's Lwt. Eight
		Sr. Men's Lwt. Pair
2010	Canadian Champions	Sr. Women's Double
2009	Canadian Champions	Sr. Women's Eights
		Sr. Men's Four
		Jr. Women's Lwt. Pair
2008	Henley Royal Regatta	Princess Elizabeth Challenge Cup
	Canadian Champions	Sr. Men's Eight
		Sr. Men's Four
2007	Canadian Champions	Jr. Men's Eights
2006	Canadian Champions	Jr. Men's Eights
2005	Canadian Champions	Sr. Women's Four
		Sr. Men's Four
		Sr. Men's Eight
2004	Canadian Champions	Sr. Men's Four
		Sr. Women's Four
		Sr. Men's Eight
2003	Canadian Champions	Jr. Men's Four
2002	Canadian Champions	Sr. Women's Pair
		Jr. Men's Eights
2001	Canadian Champions	Sr. Men's Four

(Note: championships exist pre-2001 to the founding.)

=== Rugby union ===
BC AA Girls Rugby Champions - 2023
BC Boys AAA Rugby Champions - 2022
BC Boys AAAA Rugby Champions – 2019
BC Boys AAAA Rugby Champions – 2017
BC Junior Boys AAA Rugby Champions – 2017
Junior Boys Rugby 7s Champions – 2016
BC Junior Boys AAA Rugby Champions – 2016
Senior Boys CAIS Rugby Champions – 2016
Girls CAIS Rugby Champions – 2016
BC Girls AA Rugby Champions – 2016
BC Boys AAAA Rugby Champions – 2016
BC Boys AAA Rugby Champions – 2015
BC Boys AAA Rugby Champions – 2013
BC Boys AAA Rugby Champions – 2012
BC Boys AAA Rugby Champions – 2011
BC Boys AAA Rugby Champions – 2010
BC Boys AAA Rugby Champions – 2009
Boys CAIS National Rugby Champions – 2008
BC Boys AAA Rugby Champions – 1998
BC Girls AA Rugby Champions – 1997
BC Girls AA Rugby Champions – 1996

=== Field hockey ===
BC Girls AAA Sr. Field Hockey Champions – 2014
BC Girls AA Field Hockey Champions – 2011

=== Ice hockey ===
CSSHL Midget Varsity Champions – Boys' Midget Varsity – 2016

CSSHL Midget Varsity Champions – Boys' Midget Varsity – 2015

(Note: championships existed pre-1996 to the founding.)

== Notable people ==
=== Notable alumni ===
==== Artists ====
- Robert Stewart Hyndman – Artist
- Peter Saul – Artist

==== Athletes ====
- Eloise Blackwell – New Zealand Black Ferns captain (46 caps)
- Brett Beukeboom – Rugby Canada captain (32 caps) and Cornish Pirates player
- Casey Crowley – New Zealand field hockey player (38 caps)
- Hannah Darling – 2016 Olympic bronze medalist, 2015 Pan American Games gold medalist, Rugby Canada player
- Bryan Donnelly – Team Canada rower, 2000 Olympic Games
- Eddie Evans – Rugby Canada player, prop for Canada national team, 1987, 1991, 1995 Rugby World Cups (50 caps)
- George Hungerford – 1964 Olympic gold medalist for Team Canada in the coxless pair
- Josh Jackson – Rugby Canada player (22 caps)
- John Lander – 1928 Olympic gold medalist for Great Britain in the coxless four
- John Lecky – 1960 Olympic silver medalist, eight; Rugby Canada player
- Kristopher McDaniel – 2005 & 2007 World Championship bronze medalist, coxless four and pair; 2006 and 2007 Oxford and Cambridge boat races
- Djustice Sears-Duru – Rugby Canada player (67 caps)

==== Business ====
- Jim Shaw – CEO of Shaw Communications

==== Diplomats ====
- Anthony Vincent – Canadian Ambassador to Spain and Peru

==== Entertainment ====
- Jon Kimura Parker – Officer of the Order of Canada, concert pianist
- Noah Mills - Actor and Model
- Sophy Romvari - Film Director
- Tara Spencer-Nairn – Actress, Corner Gas

==== Military ====
- Rear Admiral Richard H. Leir – Royal Canadian Navy
- Rear Admiral Michael G. Stirling – Royal Canadian Navy

==== Politics and Government ====
- The Hon. Henry Pybus Bell-Irving – 23rd Lieutenant Governor of British Columbia
- The Hon. Stephen D. Owen – Federal cabinet minister and Member of Parliament
- The Hon. Nicholas Milliken – Alberta Minister of Infrastructure and Member of the Legislative Assembly
- Peter Ladner – Vancouver City Councillor

==== Scholars and scientists ====
- Graham Anderson – Scholar
- Dr. Barry F. Cooper – Political Scientist
- Dr. Steve Deering – Computer Scientist
- Dr. Roger Stanier – Microbiologist

=== Notable staff ===
- Tom Brierley – Cricketer
- Jennifer Manuel – Author, winner of the Ethel Wilson Fiction Prize (2017) and Geist Literal Literary Postcard Story Contest (2025), shortlisted for the 2025 CBC Poetry Prize
- James Robertson Justice – Actor
- Laura Russell - Canadian national team rugby player
- Jeff Williams - Canadian national team rugby player

== Affiliations ==
- The Anglican Church of Canada, diocese of British Columbia
- CAIS – Canadian Accredited Independent Schools
- NAIS – National Association of Independent Schools
- TABS – The Association of Boarding Schools
- FISA BC – Federation of Independent School Associations in British Columbia
- ISABC – Independent Schools Association of BC

== Bibliography ==
- Rough Diamond: An Oral History of Shawnigan Lake School (ISBN 0-9696005-0-X) by Jay Connolly.
- The Handbook of Canadian Boarding Schools, by Lafortune, Sylvie, Thomson, Ashley, p. 115
