= Mike Burak =

Canada international rugby union player

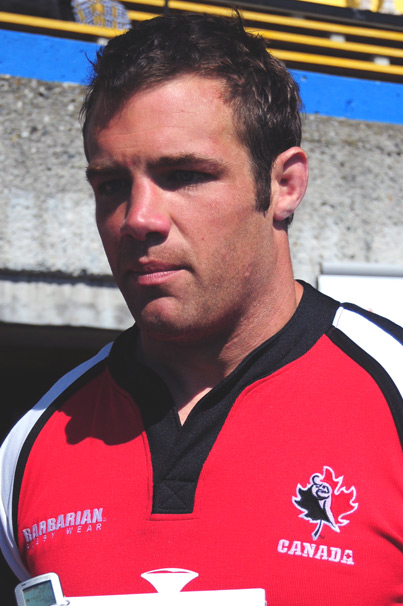
- Born: Michael Burak; 9 October 1980 (age 46) Vancouver, British Columbia
- Height: 201 cm (6 ft 7 in)
- Weight: 118 kg (18 st 8 lb)
- University: University of British Columbia

Rugby union career
- Position: Lock
Amateur team(s)
Years	Team	Apps	(Points)
- UBC Old Boys Ravens
Senior career
Years	Team	Apps	(Points)
2006-2007	Pau		
2008-2009	Cornish Pirates	20	(10)
International career
Years	Team	Apps	(Points)
2004–2009	Canada	29	(0)

Michael Burak (born October 9, 1980, in Vancouver, British Columbia) is a Canadian former international rugby union footballer. He won 29 caps for Canada between 2004 and 2009.

== Early career ==
Originally a standout basketball player at Lord Byng Secondary School in Vancouver, Burak played for two seasons at the University of British Columbia. After being cut from the men's varsity basketball squad in the 2000-2001 preseason, Burak switched to the UBC men's varsity rugby program, under head coach Spence McTavish. McTavish had coached Burak for the Lord Byng rugby team.

Burak quickly became a regular for the varsity XV, despite not having played rugby since his high school days. In 2002–03, Burak was part of a powerful UBC XV that went undefeated in league play on the way to the provincial first division title. The team also featured future Canadian internationals Chris Pack, Ryan McWhinney and Eric Wilson.

== Travel to Australia and professional rugby ==
After graduation in 2003, he travelled to Australia to watch the 2003 Rugby World Cup. Determined to make the Canadian team, Burak returned to Vancouver after the world cup and played for the UBC Old Boys Ravens; the premier XV lost in the provincial final to Capilano RFC. The following summer he made his debut for Canada at the 2004 Churchill Cup.

In 2005, he moved to Sydney, where he spent a season playing for Northern Suburbs RFC in the Shute Shield. Having established himself as a regular for the national team, Burak signed with Pau in the summer of 2006. He spent two seasons with the southern France club.

In 2008, Burak moved to England and signed with Cornish Pirates. Following a season in the southwest, Burak returned to Vancouver and the UBCOB Ravens.

He played for Canada at the 2007 Rugby World Cup.
