= Lloyd Percival =

Canadian athlete, coach, broadcaster and author

Lloyd Percival (June 3, 1913 – July 23, 1974) was a Canadian sports coach, author, and fitness guru. Percival wrote The Hockey Handbook, a work which was said to have inspired the development of hockey in the Soviet Union and other nations. He is a member of Canada's Sports Hall of Fame.

== Biography ==
Percival was born in Toronto. In his youth, he participated in multiple sports, including boxing, cricket, and tennis. As a tennis player, he reached the final of the 1929 Canadian junior championship. After losing in the championship match, he sought advice from his opponent's coach, who told him that he was using poor technique. This provided inspiration for Percival in his future coaching career. In 1936, he participated in a Canadian cricket tour of England.

Percival then became a coach for the Toronto Native Sons, a junior ice hockey team, during the 1939–40 season. He worked with ice hockey players as their fitness coach, including Gordie Howe and Terry Sawchuk, and also worked with professional golfer George Knudson, for whom he devised extensive workout programs. Sandra Bezic, George Chuvalo and Kathy Kreiner are among the other athletes trained by Percival. In addition, he became a leading track and field coach in Canada, a position he maintained into the 1960s, having founded the North Toronto Red Devils club in 1946. With athletes on the Red Devils, Percival introduced interval training and worked with them on strength development. At the time, these were new approaches for Canada, despite having been used in European nations. In addition, he advocated for training measures that did not involve running, such as diet improvements and the use of massages. Isometric exercise was a form of workout favored by Percival, along with mental training; The Globe and Mail's Lorne Rubenstein wrote that "he wanted the mind and body allied as one under the objective of getting the most out of oneself."

Along with his coaching, Percival branched out into other pursuits related to sport. On the Canadian Broadcasting Corporation (CBC) radio network, he hosted a program called The Sports College on the Air, which at one point attracted listening audiences of 800,000 people. The program first aired in the early 1940s on the CKOC radio station in Hamilton, before the CBC began running it in 1944. Percival authored various works that gave advice on proper sporting technique, in sports including basketball, ice hockey, and volleyball, along with more general fitness guides.

In 1951, Percival wrote the book The Hockey Handbook. According to sportswriter Tim Wharnsby, this work became influential in the world of ice hockey. Anatoly Tarasov, an early coach of the Soviet Union national ice hockey team, used The Hockey Handbook as a training tool in developing the country's ice hockey program, according to Wharnsby. In addition, the national teams of Czechoslovakia, Finland, and Sweden were said to have used Percival's book to aid in player development. Writers Tobias Stark and Hart Cantelon credit the book as having a more modest impact on Soviet ice hockey development, saying that the noticed version was a 1957 edition that came from Czechoslovakia; according to them, the book was noted in Sweden at the time of its first release.

National Hockey League (NHL) teams largely ignored Percival's work for most of his career. His only involvement with an NHL club was with the Detroit Red Wings, for whom he ran players through workouts and interviewed them in 1950. Author Gary Mossman wrote that "Percival was never released from the purgatory to which NHL coaches and officials relegated him for daring to challenge their knowledge of the game." Toronto Maple Leafs head coach Hap Day was among those sharply critical of Percival. The sports media also criticized Percival; one sportswriter later reported that "his ideas were too radical and comprehensive, not just for those they were designed for but also for those who report."

An athletic complex designed by Percival called the Fitness Institute opened in 1963. It featured facilities to train athletes in several sports as well as computerized equipment. Members of the complex were each given individualized programs to aid their progress. By the early 1970s, Percival began to receive greater recognition; the Canadian Olympic Association hired him as a consultant. Percival died in 1974 in Toronto. Two years later, he became a member of Canada's Sports Hall of Fame in the builder category. The Athletics Ontario Hall of Fame inducted Percival in 2016.
