= Dan Jackart =

Canada international rugby union player (born 1960)

- Born: Dan C. Jackart; May 4, 1960 (age 66) Natal, Canada
- Height: 175 cm (5 ft 9 in)
- Weight: 108 kg (17 st 0 lb)
- University: University of British Columbia

Rugby union career
- Position: Prop
- Current team: --
Senior career
Years	Team	Apps	(Points)
1991-1995	UBC Old Boys Ravens		
International career
Years	Team	Apps	(Points)
1991-1995	Canada	21	(15)

Dan C. Jackart (born May 4, 1960, in Natal) is a Canadian former rugby union player who played as prop.

== Career ==
At club level, Jackart played for the UBC Old Boys Ravens. He debuted for Canada on 11 May 1991, against Japan in Vancouver. He was also called up in the Canada team for the 1991 Rugby World Cup, playing 3 matches in the tournament. His last cap for Canada was against Fiji, in Nadi, on 8 April 1995.
