= John Hutchinson (rugby union) =

Canada international rugby union player (born 1969)

- Born: April 24, 1969 (age 57) Toronto, Ontario, Canada
- Height: 6 ft 4 in (193 cm)
- Weight: 230 lb (104 kg)

Rugby union career
- Position: Flanker
International career
Years	Team	Apps	(Points)
1993–00	Canada	50	(40)

John Hutchinson (born April 24, 1969) is a Canadian former international rugby union player.

A 6 ft 4 in flanker from Toronto, Hutchinson played his early rugby with York Yeoman, but came to the attention of Canadian selectors after joining Vancouver club UBC Old Boys Ravens. He was capped 50 times for Canada, which included a record setting run of 40 consecutive matches between 1995 and 1999. His Canada career included appearances at both the 1995 and 1999 Rugby World Cups. He played rugby in Japan for the IBM and Suntory clubs.

== See also ==
- List of Canada national rugby union players
