= Colin McKenzie (rugby union) =

Canada international rugby union player

- Born: J. Colin McKenzie; November 24, 1964 (age 61) Vancouver, British Columbia, Canada
- Height: 6 ft 1 in (185 cm)
- Weight: 230 lb (104 kg)
- University: University of British Columbia

Rugby union career
- Position: Number 8
- Current team: --
Senior career
| Years | Team | Apps | (Points) |
| 1991-1997 | UBC Old Boys Ravens | | |
International career
| Years | Team | Apps | (Points) |
| 1992-1997 | Canada | 25 | (10) |

Colin McKenzie (born May 4, 1964) is a Canadian former rugby union player who played as number eight.

== Career ==
At club level, McKenzie played for the UBC Old Boys Ravens. He debuted for Canada on 13 June 1992, against United States in Denver. He was also called up in the Canada team for the 1995 Rugby World Cup, playing 2 matches in the tournament. His last cap for Canada was against Ireland, at Lansdowne Road, on 30 November 1997.
