= UBC Old Boys Ravens =

Canadian rugby union club, based in Vancouver, BC

(Canada) UBCOB Ravens
- Full name: UBC Old Boys Ravens Rugby Football Club
- Union: Vancouver Rugby Union
- Founded: 1974; 52 years ago
- Location: Jericho Sailing Centre Association, Vancouver, British Columbia
- Ground: Jericho Park
- President: Graham Turner
- League: BC Premier League
- 2024/2025: Champions

Official website
- www.ravensrugby.club

UBC Old Boys Ravens is a Canadian rugby union team based in Vancouver, British Columbia. Founded in 1974, Ravens was formed by graduates from the University of British Columbia. The club currently competes in, and is the three-time defending champion of, the British Columbia Premier Rugby League.

== History ==
The UBC Old Boys Ravens came into being in 1974 when a group of graduates from the University of British Columbia, who had been coached by national coach Donn Spence and which included many young aspiring national and provincial players, decided to form their own team. They were interested in playing wide-open, entertaining, running rugby with an emphasis on letting the ball do the work. They also wished to maintain a close link with the university and their former coach Donn Spence.

In keeping with native folklore, the "Thunderbird" emblem of UBC became the "Raven" of the graduate team. The new team colours of red, white and blue represented the blue of U.B.C., the white of the British Columbia provincial team and the red, that of the Canadian National team.

In its inaugural year, 1974–75, the team played as an associate member of the Vancouver Rugby Union participating in 17 exhibition games, winning 12, losing 4 and drawing one. The Old Boys first game at Brockton Oval took place against the University of British Columbia with Donn Spence as the opposition coach. Played at a furious pace the Ravens ended victorious by a 22-17 margin. The next day both teams discovered that an arsonist had burned the wooden Brockton Grandstand to the ground. This prompted a couple of Old Boys (* actually a couple of Georgians – but we'll let it lie) to quickly salvage a number of charred beams from the Oval grandstand, and the refurbished beams later became the structure and framework of the club's present bar. The Ravens celebrated their first year by pumping in 72 tries, scoring 402 points and yielding only 196. The Old Boys hosted three touring teams during their inaugural year: the Calgary Irish, the Kings Scholars from Ireland and Wainuiomata from New Zealand. Not a bad start!

In the 1975 season the Ravens became official members of the Vancouver Rugby Union, and in order to expand the number of playing bodies, the Old Boys became an “open” club inviting players, other than U.B.C. graduates, to join their ranks. The club expanded to field both a first and a second side.

In 1977-78 the Ravens won their first Miller Cup, symbolic of Vancouver Rugby Union supremacy and proceeded to the Provincial Championship only to be turned back by the powerful James Bay club at MacDonald Park in Victoria.

The Georgian R.F.C., with whom the Old Boys shared a clubhouse in a storefront in the 3600 block 4th Avenue, joined them at the B.C. Final as Second Division V.R.U. Champions. They too suffered a defeat, and the next year the two teams amalgamated.

The Old Boys captured their second Miller Cup in 1981 and once again clashed with James Bay for the Provincial Championship. This time at Brockton Oval, a dramatic last minute try by wing Alistair Palmer earned the Ravens a 21-16 victory, thus ending James Bay's seven-year reign as BC champions.

At the start of the 1981-82 season, the club toured Ireland, Scotland, and England, concluding their first international tour with two wins, one tie, and two losses. Many rugby friendships were formed, and many people were moved to tears when the Ravens left the Isles and returned to Canada. The following season, the Ravens moved into their current clubhouse at the Jericho Sailing Centre Association, where both the field and clubhouse offer stunning views of Vancouver's beaches, skyline, and mountains. Rugby World magazine recognized it as one of the most scenic facilities in the world! The Ravens celebrated their move by winning a third Miller Cup. Unfortunately, the season ended with a narrow loss to their rivals, James Bay, in the provincial title race.

The four-week long, Tenth Anniversary tour to New Zealand, Australia and Fiji by forty-seven Ravens in 1984 culminated a decade of growth. The two touring teams amassed eleven wins and no losses record and that '84 summer tour provided a successful framework for the Ravens winning another Vancouver Championship and their second Provincial Championship in 1985.

Seven a-side rugby tournaments became very popular in the eighties and the Ravens captured the lion's share of these tournaments. The eighties also included two very memorable “Mystery Tours” as well as a Pacemaker (really Old Boys) tour to Ireland, in 1985, as well as to other rugby hotbeds such as Powell River and Kelowna. Despite the touring frenzy, the club refurbished their clubhouse during this period.

In the late eighties a number of UBC graduates and other new talent took the Ravens to new heights. With the infusion of Canadian International players like John Graf, John Robertsen, Ian Stuart, Andrew Bibby, Colin MacKenzie, Rob Greig, Eddie Evans, Pat Palmer, Dan Jackart, Scott Stewart and Norm Hadley, among others, the club became First and Second division provincial champions in 1990, repeating the feat the next year as 1991 provincial champions.

A Pat Palmer coached squad won the Ravens fifth provincial title over Cowichan in 1994 with some supporters even taking a helicopter to the game on Vancouver Island and briefly hovering overhead to catch a bird's-eye view.

The Old Boys have consistently provided players to the B.C., Canada, and other world-renowned representative teams. Barry Legh, the first club president, who served for a number of years as coach, played fullback for Canada and played for the I.R.F.U. President's XV against Ireland and the Wolfhounds during Ireland's Centenary Year in 1974. Barry went on to coach at UBC as well as coach the provincial and national teams. He coached Canada at the inaugural World Cup in 1987, with Spence McTavish, also a club founder, playing for Canada and BC from 1970 until he retired from international rugby in 1987 following the inaugural World Cup in New Zealand. Spence made 22 international appearances and captained Canada's tours to Argentina in 1981, to Japan in 1982 and to the Hong Kong Sevens on a number of occasions. The Irish Wolfhounds selected him in 1973 for a tour round Ireland, and the World XV in 1976 to help celebrate the Cardiff R.F.C's Centenary.

Lock Ro Hindson earned thirty-one caps from 1973 until 1990. He became a fixture at the Hong Kong Sevens for many years and earned selection on the Southern Hemisphere Barbarian tour to South Africa.

Jack Shaw represented Canada against France in 1978 and served as club captain and coach. He too played with the Irish Wolfhounds in 1973 and is legendary in the annals of Canadian Rugby for ripping the lapels off the President of the Canadian Rugby Union's jacket, an act that curtailed his international career.

During the late eighties, the Ravens attracted a number of Canada's best young players who had not only played for their club and country, but had also gone on to play in the new professional era.

John Graf, one of Canada's finest players, played for Canada fifty-four times, and was a member of the 1991, 1995 and 1999 World Cup teams. He played professionally in Wales.

Scott Stewart enjoyed a strong professional career in England with Harlequins and Bedford. He is the most capped Raven with 64 appearances for Canada.

Canadian International, NA 4 and Canada 7's players who have worn the Ravens colors, include Preston Wiley, Garth Henrikson, Leigh Hillier, Rob Greig, Andrew Bibby, Larry Chung, Doug Tate, Ray Banks, Chris LeFevre, Colin McKenzie, John Robertsen, Paul Monaghan, Pat Palmer, Eddie Evans, John Hutchinson, Dan Jackart, Norm Hadley, Danny Nikas, Paul White, Jason Hartley, Troy MacDonald, Colin Robertson, Kyle Nichols, Trevor Hammond, Mike Armstrong, Jeff Bovis, Kevin Wirachowki, Mark Reid, Jim Yeganegi, John Morelatto, Pat Desaulles, Joey Alexis, Jesse Fender and Morgan Jones. Jim Douglas (also the current Canada players rep) played at the 2003 World Cup, and Mike Burak at the 2007 World Cup campaigns, respectively. Stan McKeen unfortunately fell prey to injury just before leaving for the 2007 World cup in France but continues as one of Canada's leading players. He left the Ravens to play professional rugby in Europe.

A stream of players from the Ravens junior ranks has filled many Canadian age grade teams: U 17, U 19, U 20 and U 21. Significantly, this team also featured “a second generation” player in Garth Hendrickson's son Benz.

Raven women have also earned representative honours. Hooker Lesley MacKenzie earned selection to the Canadian Women's World Cup in Edmonton in 2005.

The club operates a youth rugby program on Sunday mornings at Jericho. The program serves children aged four to fourteen, who wear the team's jerseys while learning basic rugby skills to prepare for future participation in the club.

In May 2018, the club won their first Rounsefell Cup in 24 years, defeating the UBC Thunderbirds 16-10. The Ravens side that day featured 10 former UBC T-Birds, including Nick Waggot, who forced a knock-on resulting in the final whistle when UBC were threatening to score.

The Ravens followed their 2018 championship by winning the inaugural Canadian Rugby Club Championships, hosted at Klahanie Park. The Ravens attack was led by player of the tournament Aaron McLelland and Connor Braid, who joined the team for the tournament.

On May 4, 2019, the Ravens defended the Rounsefell Cup by beating Burnaby Lake 30-22. Earlier that day, the Rippers won the Premier Reserve championship, led by captain Benji Couling.

The Ravens won back to back to back Rounsefell Cups in 2024, 2025 and 2026, continuing the trend of the cup only being won by either the Ravens or the T-Birds, dating back to 2015.

== Women's Team ==
The UBC Old Boys women's team was resurrected in 2025, after last playing in 2009. For the first season back, in 2025-26, the club is only playing exhibition games, but they plan to have a team ready for a full season for 2026-27. The team is coached by Jake Thiel.

== Championships ==
The UBC Old Boy Ravens have won the Rounsefell Cup ten times, in 1981, 1985, 1990, 1991, 1994, 2018, 2019, 2024,2025 and 2026.

The Jericho Old Girls (Affiliated) were the unofficial Gordon Harris Memorial Cup Winners, the Elite Women's Provincial Club Championship in 1982.

On December 9, 2018, the U16 Ravens won the BC Provincial Championship in Victoria with a 14-13 win over James Bay Rugby with a thrilling second half comeback.

On February 4, 2023, the U18 Ravens won the BC Provincial Championship in Langford with a 26-17 victory over the Sailish Sea Warriors to become back to back U18 Provincial Champions. The U18s repeated as champions the following season to win back to back BC Provincial Championships, and mark three years unbeaten

== Titles ==
- Rounsefell Cup: 10

1981, 1985, 1990, 1991, 1994, 2018, 2019, 2024, 2025, 2026

- Canadian Rugby Club Championship: 1

2018

== Notable players ==
- Mike Burak
- Sean Duke
- Ed Fairhurst
- Sean Ferguson
- John Graf
- Scott Stewart
- Norm Hadley
- John Robertson
- Colin McKenzie
- Pat Palmer
- Tyler Hotson
- Barry Leigh
- Tom Luke
- Ro Hindson
- Rob Greig
- Spence McTavish
- Tracie McTavish
- Andrew Bibby
- Jason Hartley
- Eddie Evans
- Danny Nikas
- Dan Jackart
- John Hutchinson
- Callum Morrison
- Gareth Rees
- Dave Spicer
- Conor Trainor
- Lesley McKenzie
