= John Graf =

Canada international rugby union player

John D. Graf
- Born: December 3, 1968 (age 57) Vancouver, British Columbia, Canada
- Height: 5 ft 9 in (175 cm)
- Weight: 195 lb (88 kg)
- School: St. Michaels University School
- University: University of British Columbia

Rugby union career
- Position: Scrum-half
Youth career
- St. Michaels University School
Senior career
Years	Team	Apps	(Points)
1989-1991	UBC Old Boys Ravens		
1991-1992	Sporting Club Decazevillois		
1992-1993	UBC Old Boys Ravens		
1996-1997	Bridgend RFC		
International career
Years	Team	Apps	(Points)
1989-1999	Canada	54	(89)
National sevens team
Years	Team		Comps
1991-1999	Canada		1993-1997

John D. Graf (born December 3, 1968) is a former Canadian national rugby player. He had the unique distinction of being capped at five positions: wing, center, full back, fly-half and scrum-half.

Graf debuted for Canada against an Ireland XV, in Victoria, on September 2, 1989. He also played the 1991, 1995 and 1999 World Cups. His last cap was in the 1999 Rugby World Cup, against Namibia, in Toulouse, on October 24, 1999. He also played for Canada Sevens between 1991 and 1993, including two appearances in the 1993 and 1997 World Cup Sevens. In 2009, he was inducted at the British Columbia Rugby Hall Of Fame.
