= Scott Stewart (rugby union) =

Canada international rugby union player

Douglas Scott Stewart
- Born: January 16, 1969 (age 57) Vancouver, British Columbia
- Height: 6 ft 2 in (188 cm)
- Weight: 195 lb (88 kg)
- University: University of British Columbia

Rugby union career
- Position(s): Fullback, Fly Half, Wing, Center
Senior career
Years	Team	Apps	(Points)
1986 - 2001	UBC Old Boys		
–	Harlequins		
–	Bedford Blues		
Provincial / State sides
Years	Team	Apps	(Points)
1986 - 1994	British Columbia		
International career
Years	Team	Apps	(Points)
1989–2001	Canada	64	(84)
National sevens team
Years	Team		Comps
1992-1997	Canada		
Coaching career
- Years: Team
- 2004 - 2019: UCLA

Douglas Scott Stewart (born January 16, 1969, in Vancouver, British Columbia) is a former Canadian national rugby player.

== Career ==
His first international cap for Canada was on September 23, 1989, against United States in Toronto. He was also part of the 1991 Rugby World Cup Canada squad, playing all the matches against Fiji, Romania, France and New Zealand. He was also in the 1995 and in the 1999 World Cups, playing all the three pool stage matches in both tournaments. His last test was against England, on June 9, 2001, in Burnaby Lake. At club level, he played for the UBC, UBC Old Boys, Harlequins and Bedford Blues and Dax.

In 2018, Stewart was inducted into the British Columbia Rugby Hall of Fame. Since then he has been inducted to the British Columbia Sports Hall of Fame as a member of the 1991 Canadian World Cup Team and the Canadian Rugby Hall of Fame in 2019.
