= Pat Palmer (rugby union) =

Canada international rugby union player

Patrick Palmer
- Born: November 6, 1962 (age 64) Vancouver, British Columbia, Canada
- School: St.George's School
- University: University of British Columbia

Rugby union career
- Position: Wing
Senior career
Years	Team	Apps	(Points)
1987-1992	UBC Old Boys		
International career
Years	Team	Apps	(Points)
1983-1992	Canada	17	(36)
Coaching career
- Years: Team
- 1994: UBC Old Boys Ravens
- 2001: Canada sevens
- 2014: St.George's School (sevens team)

Patrick Palmer (born November 6, 1962, in Vancouver, British Columbia, Canada) is a former Canadian national rugby player.

Palmer played a total of 17 games for Canada, including 3 matches in the 1987 Rugby World Cup, where he scored the first try against Tonga, as well as 3 matches in the 1991 Rugby World Cup.

He also coached the 1994 UBC Old Boys Ravens squad which won its fifth provincial title against Cowichan with some supporters even taking a helicopter to the game on Vancouver Island and briefly hovering overhead to catch a bird’s-eye view. In 2001, Palmer coached Canada Under-17 and Canada Sevens. Currently, he coaches the St. George's School sevens team.
