= Norm Hadley =

Canada international rugby union player

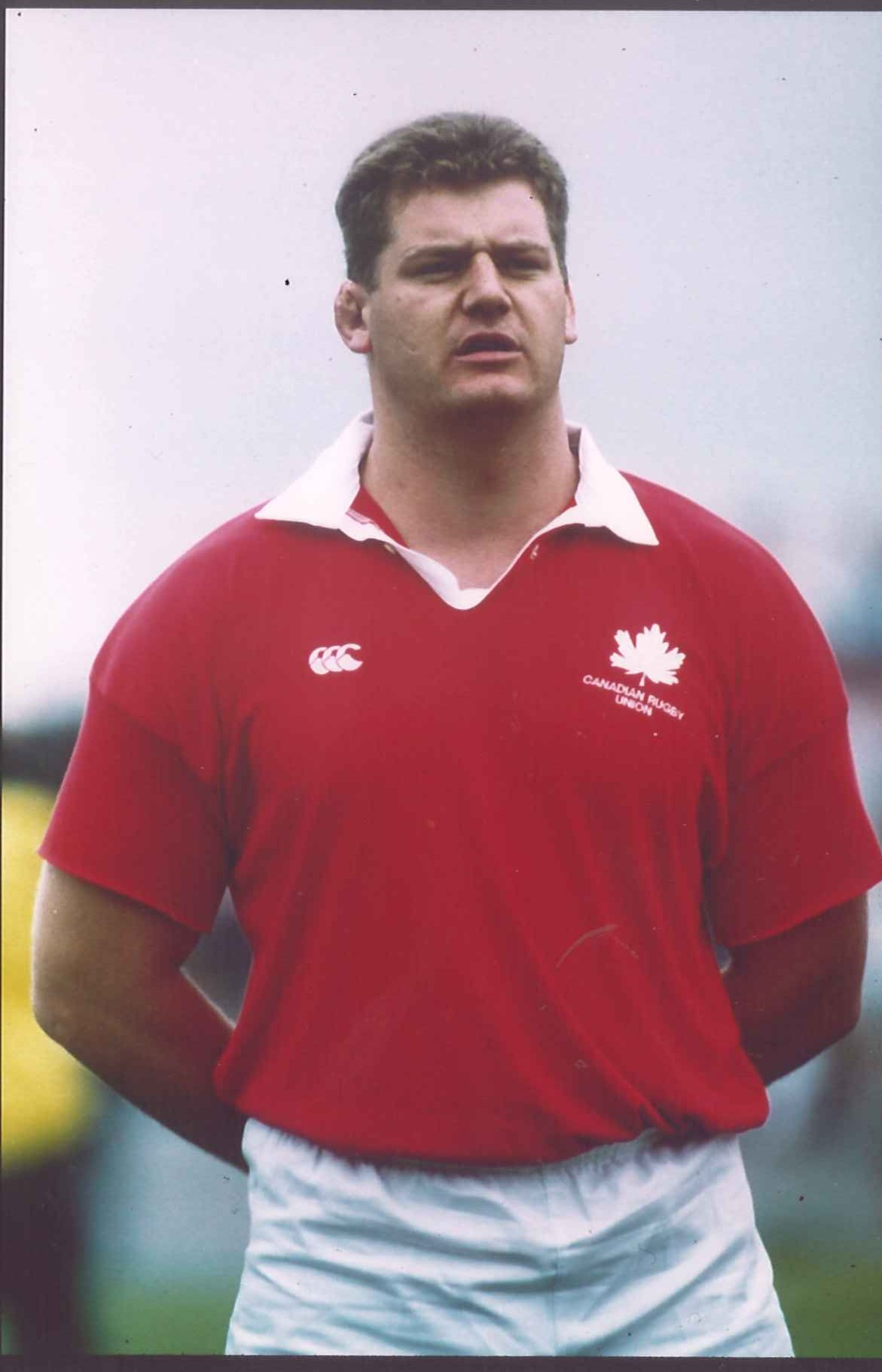
- Norm Hadley lines up in World Cup action
- Born: 2 December 1964 Winnipeg, Manitoba, Canada
- Died: 26 March 2016 (aged 51) Tokyo, Japan
- Height: 2.01 m (6 ft 7 in)
- Weight: 130 kg (287 lb; 20 st 7 lb)

Rugby union career
- Position: Lock
Senior career
Years	Team	Apps	(Points)
- London Wasps
- Bedford Blues
1991-1992	Suntory		
International career
Years	Team	Apps	(Points)
1987–1994	Canada	15	(0)

Norman Hadley (2 December 1964 – 26 March 2016) was a Canadian rugby union player. "Stormin' Norman" was a massive 6 ft 7 in (2.01 m), 21-stone (130 kg) lock. He played professionally first for London Wasps and then Bedford Blues in the 1990s. In Canada he played for James Bay and UBCOB Ravens (British Columbia Rugby Union). He earned an M.B.A. degree from UBC in 1991. He also played for Western Suburbs in Wellington, New Zealand. He earned 15 caps for Canada between 1987 and 1994, and was part of the team that reached the quarter-final of the 1991 Rugby World Cup.

== Career ==
Hadley captained his national side five times in 1992–3, including on 17 October 1992 at Wembley Stadium, a 26–13 loss to England. Canada's narrow quarter-final defeat to the New Zealand All Blacks in the 1991 World Cup is said to be Canada's finest hour. That 1991 Canadian team made a defeated Fiji and Romania and giving both France and New Zealand close games.

Following a dominant performance in the 1991 World Cup, he was named to the World Team (as selected by Rugby World magazine), and was subsequently chosen to play for the Barbarians against the World Cup winners Australia at Twickenham in 1992. His locking partner for the Barbarians that day was All Black Ian Jones. He went on to represent the Barbarians another four times. He was named Athlete of the Year in his hometown of Victoria, British Columbia following the World Cup in 1991.

While working in London and playing for Wasps, he became widely known for an incident in which he had a physical altercation with two individuals whom were recognized for their disorderly conduct on the London Underground. This incident received extensive press coverage in Britain and was later referenced in the House of Commons by then Prime Minister John Major. Already an established commentator on BBC TV's Rugby Special, he subsequently received additional offers for other appearances on television.

Hadley has one daughter, Madison Elle Watson. He was the grandson of celebrated Academy Award-winning cinematographer Osmond Borradaile.

At the age of 51, after many years of battling depression, chronic pain and suspected Chronic Traumatic Encephalopathy (CTE), Hadley ended his life on 19 March 2016. The Tokyo Medical Examiner determined the cause to be an overdose of Pentobarbital. His death was announced on 27 March 2016
