= Conor Trainor =

Canadian rugby union player

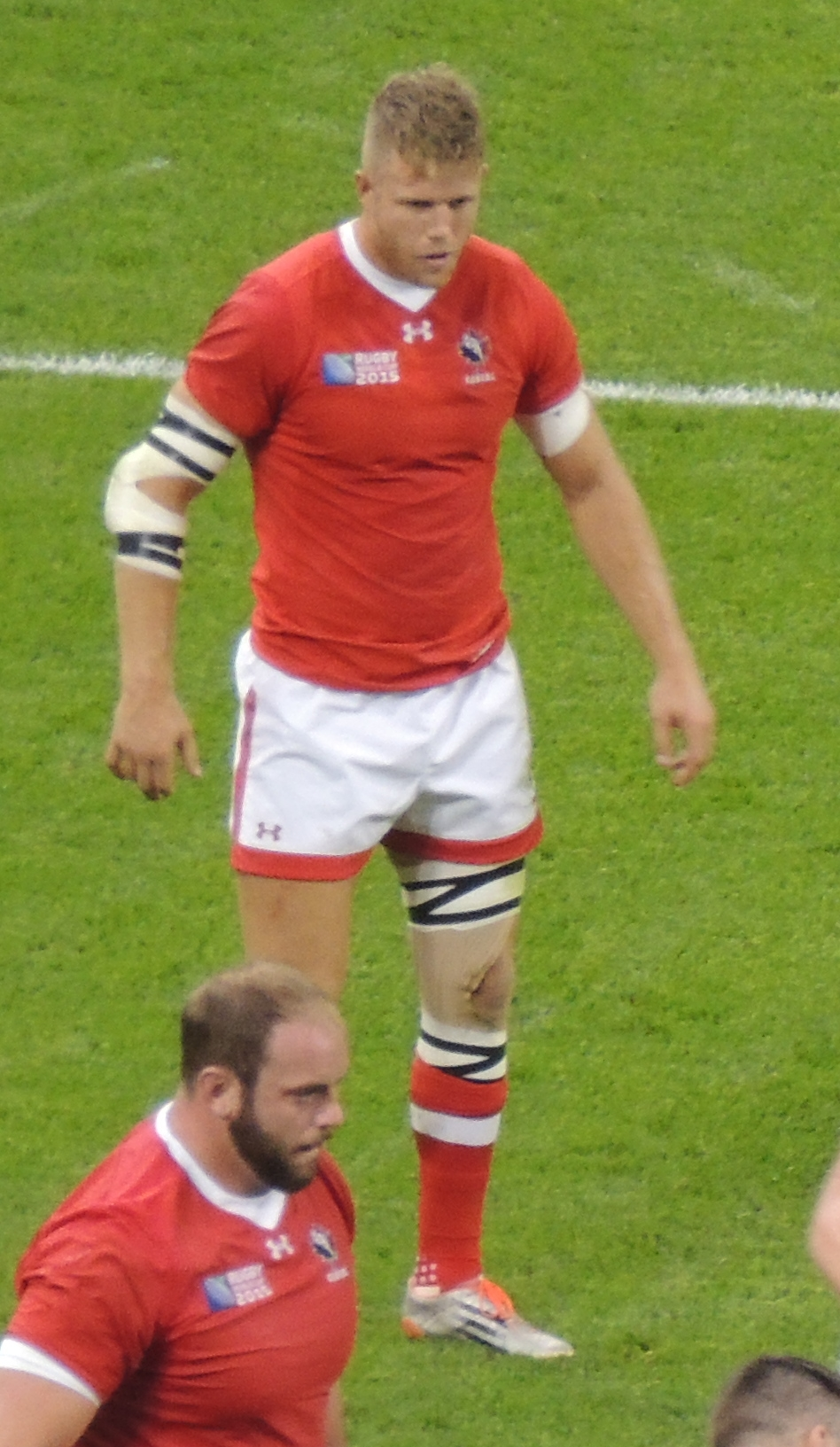
- Conor Trainor in 2015
- Full name: Conor Adam Trainor
- Born: December 5, 1989 (age 36) Vancouver, British Columbia
- Height: 1.88 m (6 ft 2 in)
- Weight: 105 kg (231 lb)
- School: St. George's School
- University: University of Western Ontario

Rugby union career
- Position: Centre / Wing
Amateur team(s)
Years	Team	Apps	(Points)
- UBCOB Ravens
Senior career
Years	Team	Apps	(Points)
- BC Bears
2016-17	RC Vannes	24	(45)
2018-	USO Nevers	18	(20)
- Correct as of 28 July 2019
International career
Years	Team	Apps	(Points)
2008-2009	Canada U20	9	(10)
2011-	Canada	34	(40)
- Correct as of 9 September 2019
National sevens team
Years	Team		Comps
- Canada
Medal record
Men's rugby sevens
Representing Canada
Pan American Games
Gold medal – first place	2015 Toronto	Team competition
Gold medal – first place	2011 Guadalajara	Team competition

Conor Adam Trainor (born December 5, 1989) is a Canadian rugby union player. He is from Vancouver, where he started playing rugby at St. George's School.

== Career ==
He plays in the centers or on the wing for 15s and prop for 7s rugby. Since then he has been a member of the BC age grade and men's provincial side, Western's 15s and 7s teams, Canada U20, Canada 7s and the World Cup Canada 15s program. He was part of the Canadian squad at the 2011 Rugby World Cup in New Zealand where he featured in four matches. While studying engineering at the University of Western Ontario, he played a large part in bringing the gold medal to London in 2011, thus making him an OUA champion as well. Currently he plays professional rugby in the French Ligue 2.

=== Sevens ===
In June 2021, Trainor was named to Canada's 2020 Summer Olympics team.
