= Andrew Bibby (rugby union) =

Canada international rugby union player

- Full name: Andrew John Bibby
- Born: 24 April 1957 (age 69) Barnet, London, England
- Height: 6 ft (183 cm)
- Weight: 11 st 8 lb (162 lb; 73 kg)
- School: St. George's School
- University: University of British Columbia; University of Oxford
- Occupation: Business executive

Rugby union career
- Position: Centre
International career
Years	Team	Apps	(Points)
1979–85	Canada	9	(7)

Andrew John Bibby (born April 24, 1957) is an English-born Canadian former international rugby union player.

Born in Barnet, London, Bibby attended St. George's School in Vancouver and studied at the University of British Columbia, before returning to England for postgraduate studies at the University of Oxford.

Bibby, a three-quarter, was a two-time Oxford blue, featuring in the 1980 and 1981 Varsity matches. The latter, played in three inches of snow, which historic as the 100th Varsity match.

Capped nine times, Bibby played as a centre on the Canada national team between 1979 and 1985. He played his rugby in Canada with UBC Thunderbirds and UBC Old Boys.

Bibby was appointed CEO of Grosvenor Group Americas in 2009.

== See also ==
- List of Canada national rugby union players
