= Eddie Evans =

Canada international rugby union player

- Born: Edward A. Evans; September 15, 1964 (age 62) Terrace, British Columbia, Canada
- Height: 5 ft 11 in (180 cm)
- Weight: 237 lb (108 kg)
- School: Shawnigan Lake School
- University: University of British Columbia

Rugby union career
- Position: Prop
Senior career
Years	Team	Apps	(Points)
1986–1992	UBC Old Boys Ravens		
1992–2002	IBM		
International career
Years	Team	Apps	(Points)
1986–1998	Canada	50	(14)

Edward A. Evans (born September 15, 1964) is a Canadian former rugby union player who played as a prop.

== Career ==
Evans first played at club level for UBC Old Boys Ravens until 1992, when he moved to Japan to play for IBM. He debuted for the Canada national team on 8 November 1986, against the United States in Tucson. He played three Rugby World Cups, in 1987, 1991 and 1995. His last cap for Canada was against Argentina, in Buenos Aires on 22 August 1998. He retired from his playing career in 2002, to later launch X-treme Rugby Wear, a Thailand-based sportswear company.

Evans got inducted into BC Rugby Hall of Fame Class 2024 - Player in June 2024 followed by the Rugby Canada Hall of Fame Class of 2024 induction held at the HSBC Vancouver 7s in February 2025.
