= Graham Anderson =

Canadian heraldic scholar and officer of arms (1929–2012)

Graham Leslie Anderson FRHSC (April 8, 1929 – November 18, 2012) was a British-born Canadian heraldic scholar and officer of arms. Anderson was formerly a student of Shawnigan Lake School and he began teaching at the School in 1957. He was the longest serving staff member at Shawnigan. He held the title of Senior Master Emeritus. He served as a housemaster for almost 30 years, and taught in the Social Studies department. He was also the caretaker of the chapel organ, the second largest pipe organ on Vancouver Island. Anderson was also the caretaker of the rifle range now known as the Graham Anderson Range.

Born in Bradford, Yorkshire, England, Anderson achieved much in the world of heraldry. He was elected a Fellow of the Royal Heraldry Society of Canada in 1988. In 1992 he was awarded the Commemorative Medal for the 125th Anniversary of the Confederation of Canada. Having been a consultant at the Canadian Heraldic Authority since its inception in 1988, Anderson was appointed Cowichan Herald Extraordinary at the Authority in 1999. More recently, he received the Queen Elizabeth II Golden Jubilee Medal.

Anderson's arms were matriculated and recorded in the Court of the Lord Lyon and they were registered with the Canadian Heraldic Authority on 22 June 1992. The arms are blazoned Or on a Saltire engrailed Sable between a Mullet in chief and another in base Azure and as many Anchors in the flanks Gules a Rose Argent barbed and seeded Or all within a Bordure counter compony Or and Sable. His crest is A Griffin segreant Erminois membered armed beaked and ducally crowned Or supporting in its talons an Anchor Gules.

He died in Duncan, British Columbia, in November 2012. A Celebration of his life was held at the Shawnigan Lake School Chapel on December 8, 2012, with music playing on the organ that Anderson built.
