= Richard H. Leir =

Canadian admiral

- Born: November 19, 1921; Penticton, British Columbia
- Died: May 28, 2015 (aged 93) Saanichton, British Columbia
- Allegiance: Canada
- Branch: Royal Canadian Navy; Canadian Forces Maritime Command
- Rank: Rear-Admiral
- Commands: Maritime Forces Pacific
- Conflicts: Second World War: Battle of the Atlantic; Battle of the Denmark Strait; Sinking of Prince of Wales and Repulse; Battle of the Java Sea; Korean War

Rear-Admiral Richard Hugh Leir (November 19, 1921 in Penticton, British Columbia – May 28, 2015 in Saanichton, British Columbia), joined the Royal Canadian Navy as a cadet in 1940, after attending Shawnigan Lake School and the Royal Naval College in Dartmouth, England, continued his early training with the Royal Navy.

During the Second World War, he witnessed the sinking of the battlecruiser HMS Hood and survived the sinking of the battleship HMS Prince of Wales and the cruiser HMS Exeter. Following the latter, he was officially listed as dead for three years while actually a prisoner-of-war of the Japanese.

Between 1945 and 1954, Leir saw service in five destroyers and two frigates, including duty as operations officer in HMCS Athabaskan during the Korean War in 1950-51. Between 1954 and 1962, he commanded the destroyer HMCS Crusader, attended the RN Staff College, was executive officer of the aircraft carrier HMCS Bonaventure and was the training commander in the Fleet School at Halifax.

He commanded the destroyer HMCS Skeena in the Pacific in 1962. In 1963, he took command of HMCS Venture, the officer cadet training establishment in Esquimalt. In August 1964, he was appointed to Canadian Forces Headquarters. In 1965, he was made Commander, First Canadian Escort Squadron, based at Halifax and the following year promoted to commodore as Senior Canadian Officer Afloat Atlantic.

Leir went to the National Defence College in 1967 and to National Defence Headquarters as a director general in 1968.

He was promoted to rear-admiral on June 18, 1970, and appointed Commander Maritime Forces Pacific in which capacity he served for three years until designated Chief of Maritime Operations in Ottawa, retiring on 14 August 1975.

He described his experiences in a documentary video, Two Prisoners of War, produced by Policy Publishers Inc. (Pat Ryan, John Frank, Maurice Turner). A copy is available for viewing at the DND Directorate of History and Heritage in Ottawa.

Leir died on May 28, 2015.
