= Tom Brierley =

English and Canadian cricketer

Personal information
- Full name: Thomas Leslie Brierley
- Born: 15 June 1910; Southampton, Hampshire, England
- Died: 7 January 1989 (aged 78); Victoria, British Columbia, Canada
- Batting: Right-handed
- Role: Wicket-keeper

Domestic team information
- Years: Team
- 1951 & 1954: Canada
- 1946–1948: Lancashire
- 1931–1939: Glamorgan

Career statistics
| Competition | First-class |
|---|---|
| Matches | 232 |
| Runs scored | 6,224 |
| Batting average | 18.97 |
| 100s/50s | 4/27 |
| Top score | 116* |
| Balls bowled | 50 |
| Wickets | – |
| Bowling average | – |
| 5 wickets in innings | – |
| 10 wickets in match | – |
| Best bowling | – |
| Catches/stumpings | 213/93 |
- Source: CricketArchive, 14 October 2011

Thomas Leslie Brierley (15 June 1910 – 7 January 1989) was an English and Canadian cricketer. He was a right-handed batsman and a wicket-keeper. A curiosity of his county career is that his highest career score (116) was scored twice, one playing for Glamorgan, and once playing against Glamorgan.

Before the Second World War, Brierley played his county cricket for Glamorgan. After the war he moved to play for Lancashire playing for three seasons before emigrating to Canada. He took up posts as a coach with Vancouver Cricket Club, and as groundsman and economics teacher at Shawnigan Lake School.

He was considered to be one of the leading cricket coaches in Canada, and continued playing, winning a place in the Canadian national team. He played five further first-class matches for Canada in the 1950s, including a return to the UK in 1954 as part of a Canadian touring team.
