= Kristopher McDaniel =

Canadian rower

Personal information
- Born: January 27, 1982 (age 44) Cobble Hill, British Columbia, Canada
Medal record
Representing Canada
Men's Rowing
World Rowing Championships
Bronze medal – third place	2005 Gifu	Coxless Four
Bronze medal – third place	2007 Munich	Coxed Pairs

Kristopher "Kip" McDaniel (born January 27, 1982, in Cobble Hill, British Columbia) is an American-Canadian media executive and former rower.

McDaniel attended high school at Shawnigan Lake School on Vancouver Island. After high school he went on to get a Bachelor of Arts degree in government from Harvard. He attended Cambridge University, where he rowed in the 2006 and 2007 Oxford and Cambridge Boat Races, at stroke oar in 2006. He was a two-time national champion at Harvard (in the stroke seat); while there, he also rowed for USA at the Lucerne World Cup in 2004. From 2005 until 2008, he was a member of the Canadian National Team, winning bronze medals at the 2005 and 2007 World Championships.

After retiring from competitive rowing in 2008, McDaniel became the editor-in-chief of aiCIO, a financial publication based in New York City. After leaving aiCIO in 2016, McDaniel became the editor-in-chief of Institutional Investor Magazine. Since 2021, McDaniel has been President of the Americas of With Intelligence (formerly Pageant Media). He lives in Bow, New Hampshire with his family.
