= Christopher Lonsdale =

English-Canadian educator (1886–1952)

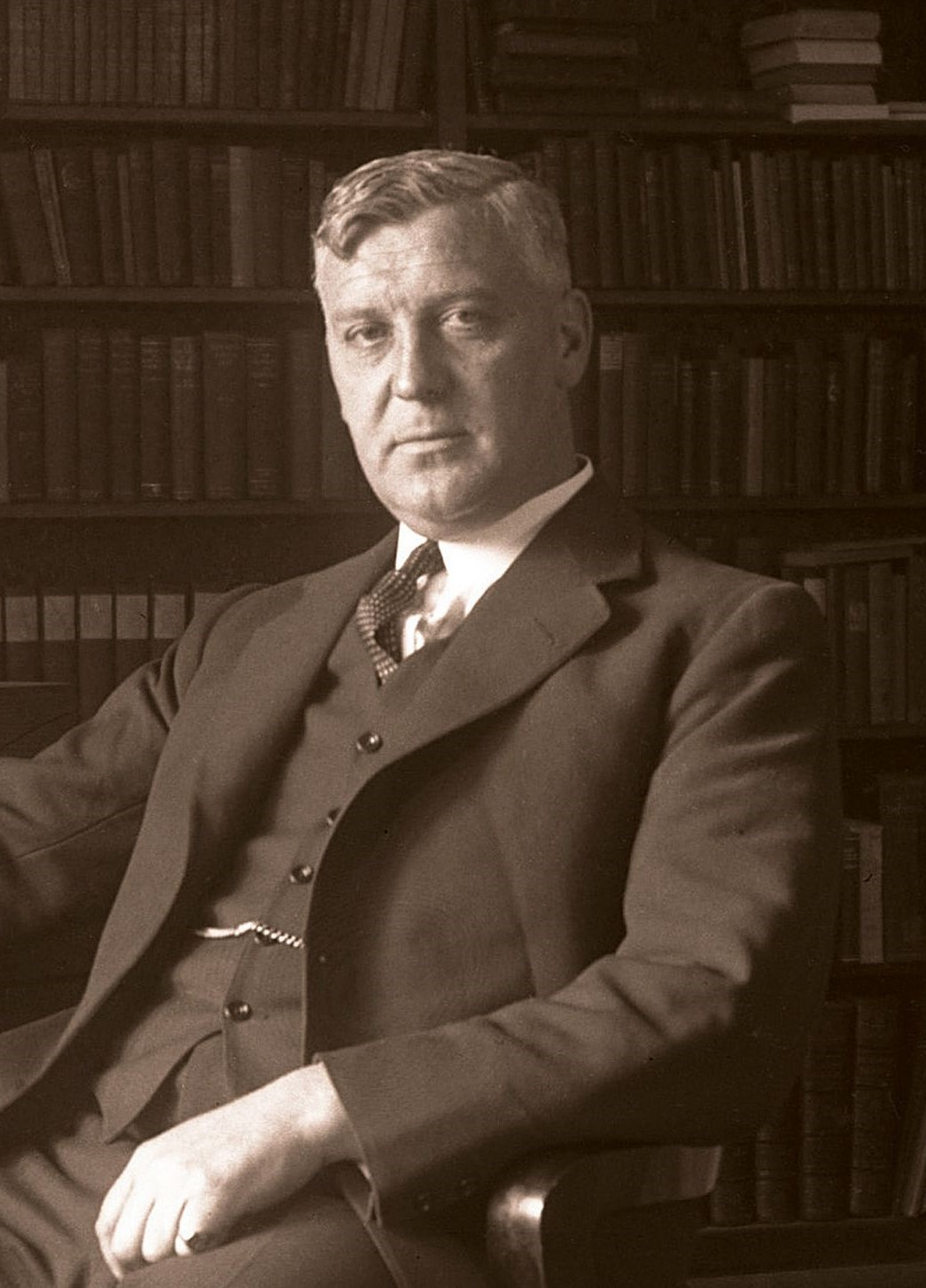

Personal details
- Born: Christopher Windley Lonsdale; February 1, 1886 Thornthwaite, England
- Died: August 3, 1952 (aged 66) Penticton, British Columbia, Canada
- Education: Durham University
- Profession: Educator

Christopher Windley Lonsdale (1886 – 1952), was an English-Canadian educator who was the founder and first Headmaster of Shawnigan Lake School, Canada's largest boarding school.

== Life ==
He was the son of the Reverend Henry Lonsdale (d. 1926), Vicar of Upperby, who was a clergyman of the Church of England, and his wife, Jane, only daughter of William Windley of Nottingham. Lonsdale was born in the northern English county of Cumberland, since incorporated within Cumbria, and was educated at Westminster School in the London borough of Westminster from May 1899 to July 1902. He attended Durham University but did not obtain a degree. In his time in England, he played for a soccer team.

Lonsdale immigrated to British Columbia from England in 1907. Two years later, having worked at a variety of jobs on the lower mainland of British Columbia and on northern Vancouver Island, he settled in Duncan, in Vancouver Island's Cowichan Valley, where for a time, he operated a dairy business. In 1916, seeing an opportunity in the lack of an English-style boys' preparatory school, he founded Shawnigan Lake School, partially modelling it on Westminster School, his own English public school.

Eventually, an ageing Lonsdale was forced into retirement, which Gossage states was his undoing: "It was a mutually painful moment and one which Christopher Lonsdale found impossible to accept. He died a broken and disconsolate man two months after."

His role is formally commemorated at Shawnigan annually by Founder's Day, which was traditionally centred on a service in the School's Chapel conducted by the School's Anglican chaplain, with a visiting keynote speaker drawn from the School's alumni in place of a sermon.

He lies buried in the French Creek Cemetery in Parksville, British Columbia.
