= Jeff Williams (rugby union, born 1974) =

Canada international rugby union player

- Born: July 17, 1974 (age 52)
- Height: 6 ft 0 in (183 cm)
- Weight: 170 lb (77 kg)
- Notable relative: Morgan Williams (brother)

Rugby union career
- Position: Fullback
International career
Years	Team	Apps	(Points)
2001	Canada	5	(0)

Jeff Williams (born July 17, 1974) is a Canadian former international rugby union player.

Raised in Cole Harbour, Nova Scotia, Williams is the elder brother of Canada scrum-half Morgan Williams and came through the Pacific Pride program in British Columbia.

Williams, a James Bay stalwart, had several years as an international rugby sevens player by the time he got his Canada senior call up in 2001. He was capped five times for Canada that year, debuting at fullback against the United States in Kingston, then later playing a tournament in Japan with the national team.

From 2015 to 2021, Williams served as coach of the Canada men's under-20 rugby union team. He has coached at Shawnigan Lake School since 2005.

== See also ==
- List of Canada national rugby union players
