= Canadian cricket tours of England =

Canadian cricket tours of England have taken place only sporadically and few matches of first-class status have been played.

== 1880s ==
The first two Canadian teams to visit England arrived in the 1880s. In the 1880 season they played 17 minor matches with a 5–6 win–loss record; while the 1887 team played 19 minor matches with a 5/5 record.

== Inter-war period ==
The next visit was after World War I in the 1922 season when the Canadians played 11 minor matches, won none and lost four. The 1936 team fared much better: they won 7 and lost only 1 with 7 drawn, all the games again being minor.

== First-class matches in 1954 ==
In the 1954 season, the Canadians played 15 matches in all, and four of them were first-class. Overall, they won four and lost three but in the four first-class matches they could only manage two draws and two defeats. Rain affected many matches on the tour. Prominent members of the team included Jimmy Cameron, who had played Test cricket for the West Indies in 1948–49 and Kenneth Trestrail, who had toured with the 1950 West Indies team in England, without playing Tests. Tom Brierley, the former Glamorgan and Lancashire wicketkeeper and batsman, was also in the side.

== Later tours ==
Canada visited England in both 1974 and 1981 but played no further first-class matches.

== 1979 ICC Trophy and World Cup ==
In 1979, Canada visited England to take part in the ICC Trophy, the one-day limited overs (on this occasion 60 overs a side) competition for non-Test playing countries, held in late May and early June. Canada won three of their four group matches, played on club grounds in the west Midlands, beating Bangladesh, Fiji and Malaysia, but losing to Denmark. They finished second in their group and, as the second-placed team with the best record, qualified for the semi-finals. On 6 June at Burton upon Trent, they beat Bermuda by 6 wickets. In the final, at Worcester on 21 June, they lost to Sri Lanka by 60 runs. However, as finalists they had already qualified for the World Cup, held between the ICC Trophy semi-finals and final.

Canada were rather out of their depth in the World Cup, losing all three of their group matches: to Pakistan by 8 wickets at Headingley on 9 June, to England by 8 wickets at Old Trafford on 14 June, when they were bowled out for 45 (though lasting 40.3 overs), and to Australia at Edgbaston by 7 wickets. John Valentine, a left-arm medium-pace bowler, dismissed Majid Khan, Mike Brearley and Rick Darling, returning figures of 9–3–18–1, 7–2–20–1 and 3–0–28–1.
