= Spence McTavish =

Canada international rugby union player

- Born: 25 August 1948 (age 78) Vancouver, British Columbia, Canada

Rugby union career
- Position: Centre
Senior career
Years	Team	Apps	(Points)
–	UBC Old Boys Ravens		
International career
Years	Team	Apps	(Points)
1970–1987	Canada	22	(23)

Spence McTavish (born 25 August 1948) is a Canadian rugby union player. He played in 22 matches for the Canada national rugby union team from 1970 to 1987, including two matches at the 1987 Rugby World Cup. He was nicknamed "Spike".

In 1992, he became the assistant coach of the UBC Old Boys Ravens, for which he previously played, replacing Barry Leigh.In 1997, he became the director of rugby of his former club, a position he held until 2014.

He also played for Canada sevens between 1980 (in which he was player-coach) and 1986. He later coached Canada sevens between 1995 and 1997.
