= Natal, British Columbia =

Coordinates: 49°43′N 114°51′W

Natal is a former coal-mining community in the Elk Valley of the Rocky Mountains in the East Kootenay region of British Columbia, Canada. Located on the Southern Mainline of the Canadian Pacific Railway, as of 1966 it became part of the District Municipality of Sparwood.

Natal is traceable to the wave of patriotism or jingoism which surrounded the South African War, 1899–1902. For the colony of Natal in South Africa, replacing the earlier name, New Michel. See Ladysmith.
