= Steve Deering =

- Education: University of British Columbia; Stanford University
- Scientific career
- Fields: Computer Science
- Workplaces: Cisco; Xerox

Stephen Deering is a former Fellow at Cisco Systems, where he worked on the development and standardization of architectural enhancements to the Internet Protocol. Prior to joining Cisco in 1996, he spent six years at Xerox's Palo Alto Research Center, engaged in research on advanced Internet technologies, including multicast routing, mobile internetworking, scalable addressing, and support for multimedia applications over the Internet. He is a former member of the Internet Architecture Board, a past chair of numerous Working Groups of the Internet Engineering Task Force (IETF), the inventor of IP multicast, and the lead designer of the new version of the Internet Protocol, IPv6. By 2017 he was retired and living in Vancouver, British Columbia.

== Education ==
Deering received his B.Sc. (1973) and M.Sc. (1982) from the University of British Columbia, and his Ph.D. (1991) from Stanford University. He attended high school at Shawnigan Lake School on Vancouver Island.

== Recognition ==
Deering is the recipient of the 2010 IEEE Internet Award for his work in IP multicast and IPv6. He was declared the 1994 "Geek of the Year" by Internet Talk Radio.
