= St. George's School (Vancouver) =

Private day and boarding school in British Columbia, Canada

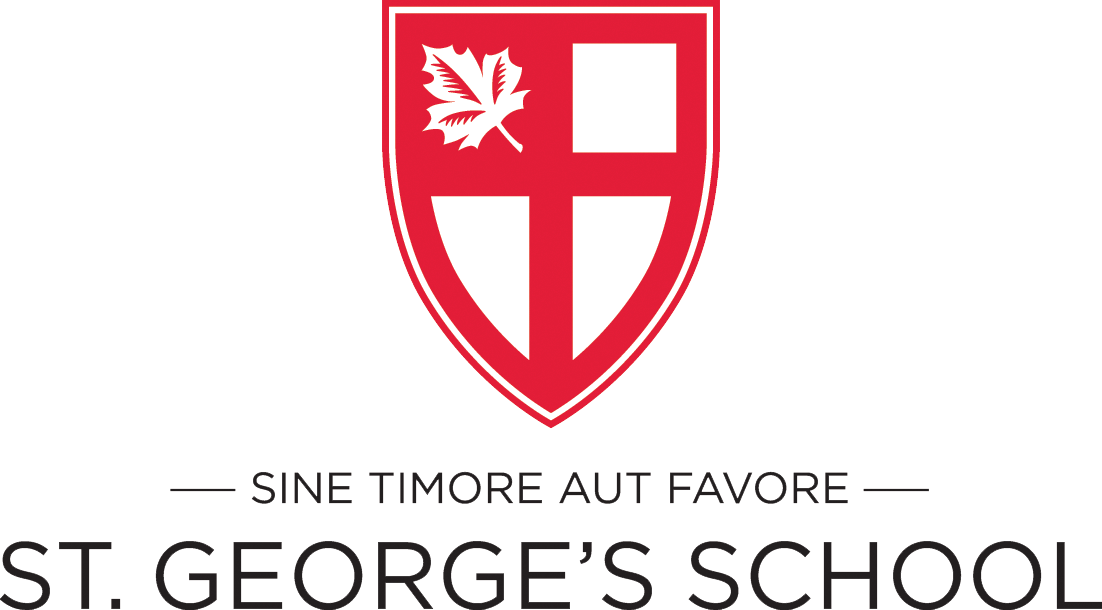

Location
- 4175 West 29th Avenue; Vancouver, British Columbia, V6S 1V1; Canada; 49°14′50″N 123°11′57″W

Information
- School type: Independent all-boys
- Motto: Sine Timore Aut Favore (Latin for 'Without Fear or Favour')
- Founded: 1930
- Headmaster: David Young
- Principal: Len Gurr (Senior School)
- Principal: Karyn Roberts (Junior School)
- Faculty: Approximately 280
- Grades: K-12
- Enrollment: 1,151
- Language: English
- Colours: Red, black, and white
- Mascot: St. George / the Dragon
- Team name: Saints / Knights / Dragons
- Endowment: $44,150,183 as of June 30, 2025
- Website: www.stgeorges.bc.ca

St. George's School is an independent boarding and day university-preparatory school for boys in the Dunbar area of Vancouver, British Columbia. It delivers the British Columbia Ministry of Education curriculum from Junior Kindergarten to Grade 12 as a ministry‑accredited program.

== History ==
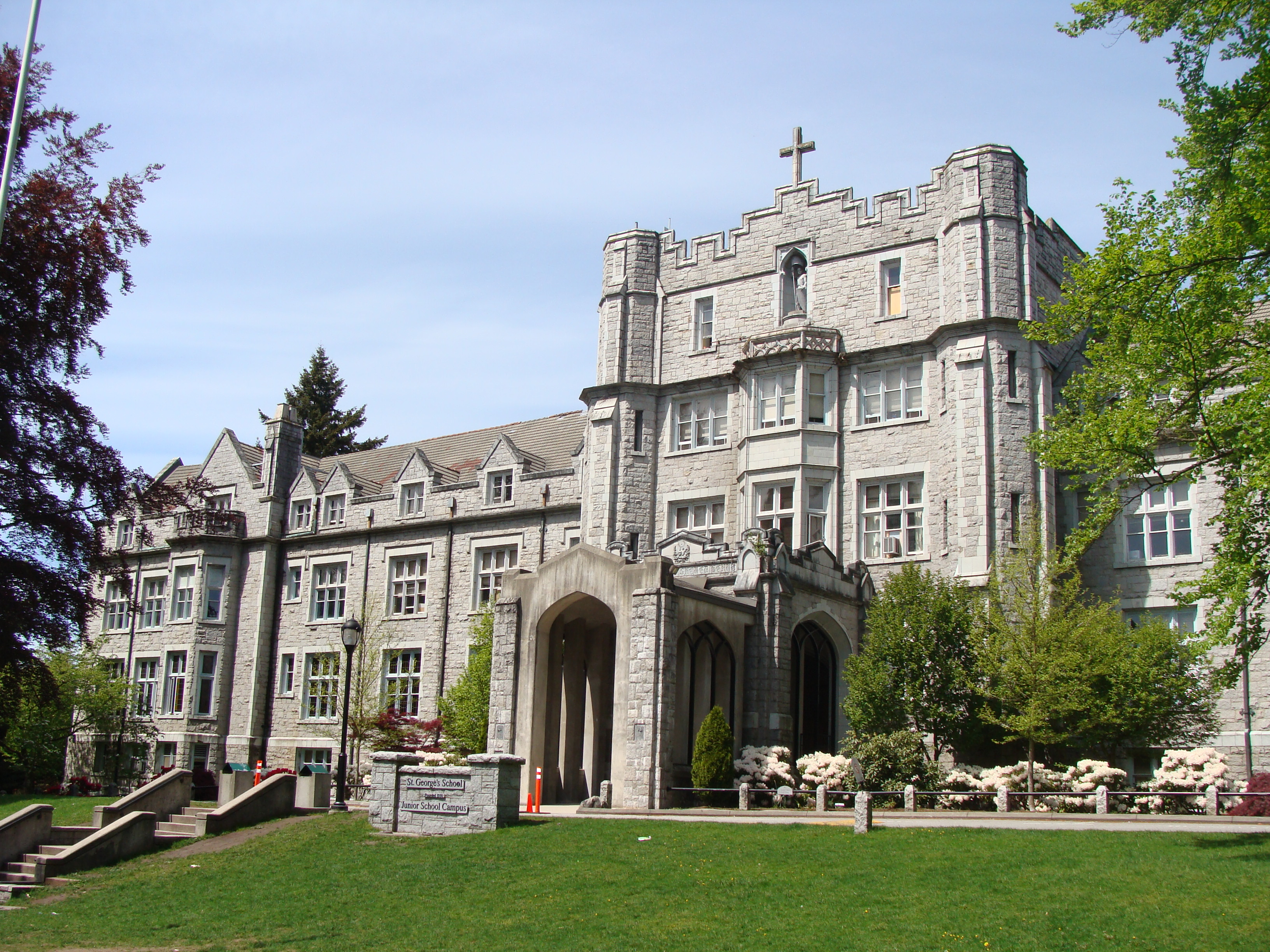
St. George's Junior School

St. George's was founded in 1930 by Captain F.J. Danby-Hunter.

The original school operated out of a large country manor house. It has since expanded, and the school now maintains two campuses: the senior school, on land leased from UBC in 1925, and the junior school, converted from the former Convent of the Sacred Heart, a historic property purchased in 1979, which had formerly served as a Catholic all-girls school.

== Student life ==
=== Student body and leadership ===
The student body at St. George's comprises 1,151 students from 22 countries, with approximately 750 at the senior school and the remainder in the Junior School. As of June 2016, 109 students were boarding students. Like other independent schools, it maintains a system of prefects and mandates the wearing of uniforms. In the Junior School, the Head Boy and Assistant Head Boy, are Grade 7 students elected by faculty and fellow students. In the senior school, the school captain, assistant captain, and other prefects are also elected by faculty and their fellow students to provide the school with student leaders. All students are assigned to “Wings,” or houses, primarily used to organize teams for physical education and athletic events. The Wings, MacDougall or Mac (Blue), Clark (Yellow), Tupper (Red), and Fell (Green), also compete in annual Wing Days, which feature athletic competitions.

== Campus ==
=== Junior School Campus ===
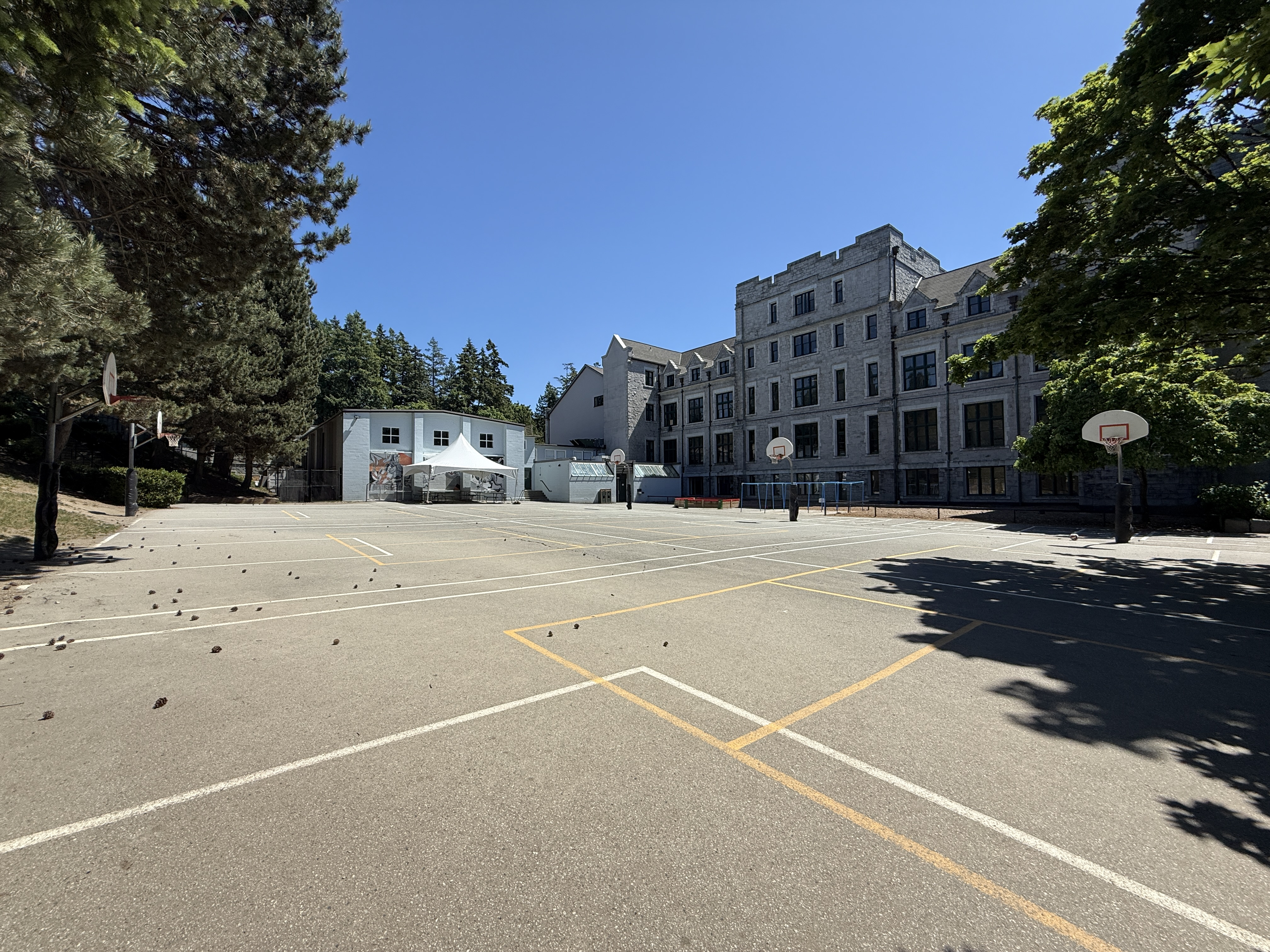
St. George's Junior School Basketball Court

The Junior School Campus is located at 3851 West 29th Avenue and serves boys from Kindergarten through Grade 7. It is a heritage granite building acquired by the school in 1979. The boarding house of the school, Harker Hall, is also located on the grounds of the Junior School.

=== Senior School Campus ===
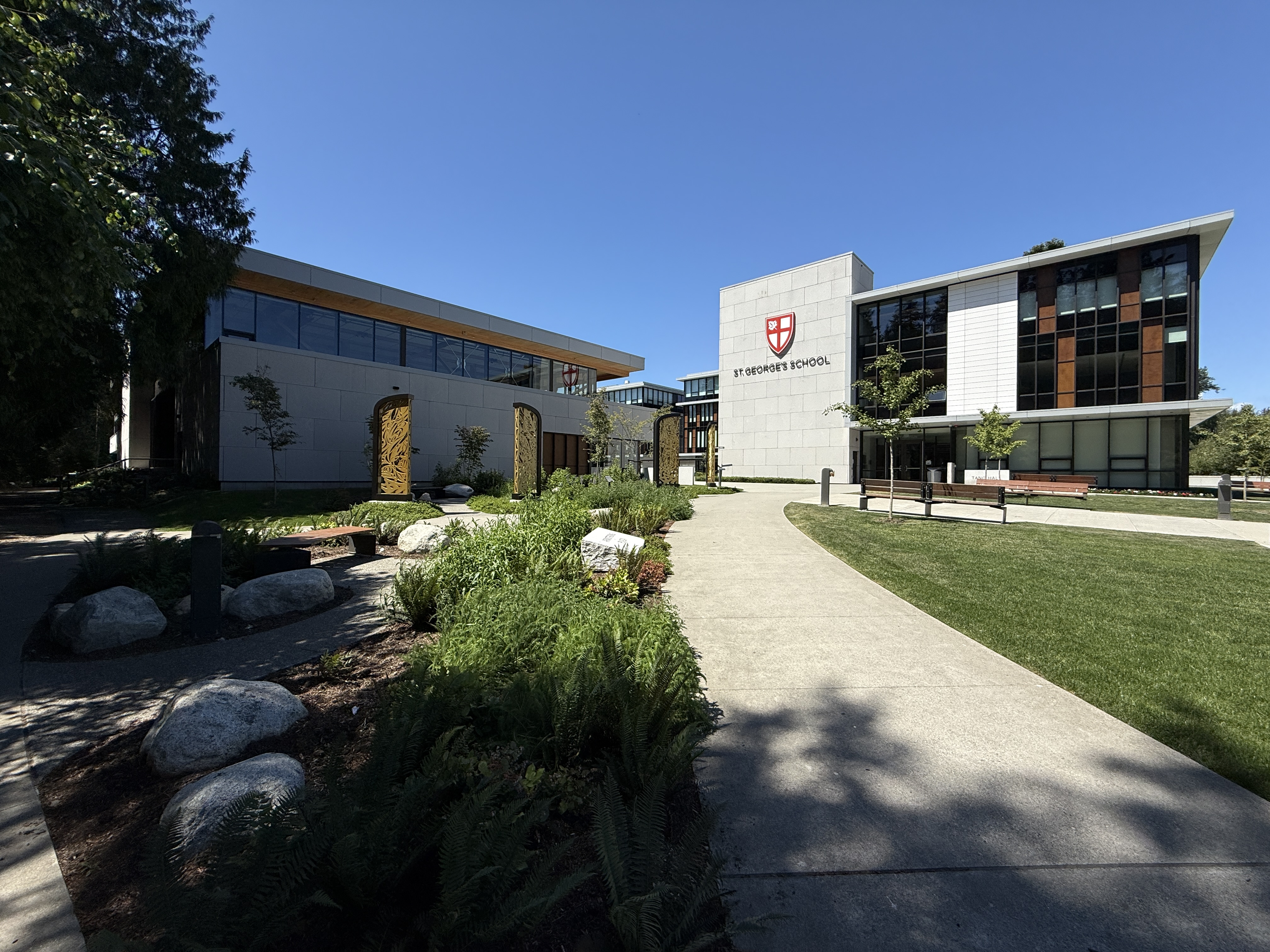
St. George's Senior School

The Senior School Campus, at 4175 West 29th Avenue, serves students from Grades 8 to 12.

Supported by the school’s ONE+ development campaign, three new Senior School buildings were completed in the beginning in 2025.

The Senior School redevelopment was designed by Gensler, with preliminary designs revealed following a rezoning approval by Vancouver City Council after public consultation. Construction progressed over several years and saw the installation of cranes and excavation that marked the beginning of progress on the new academic buildings and parking infrastructure.

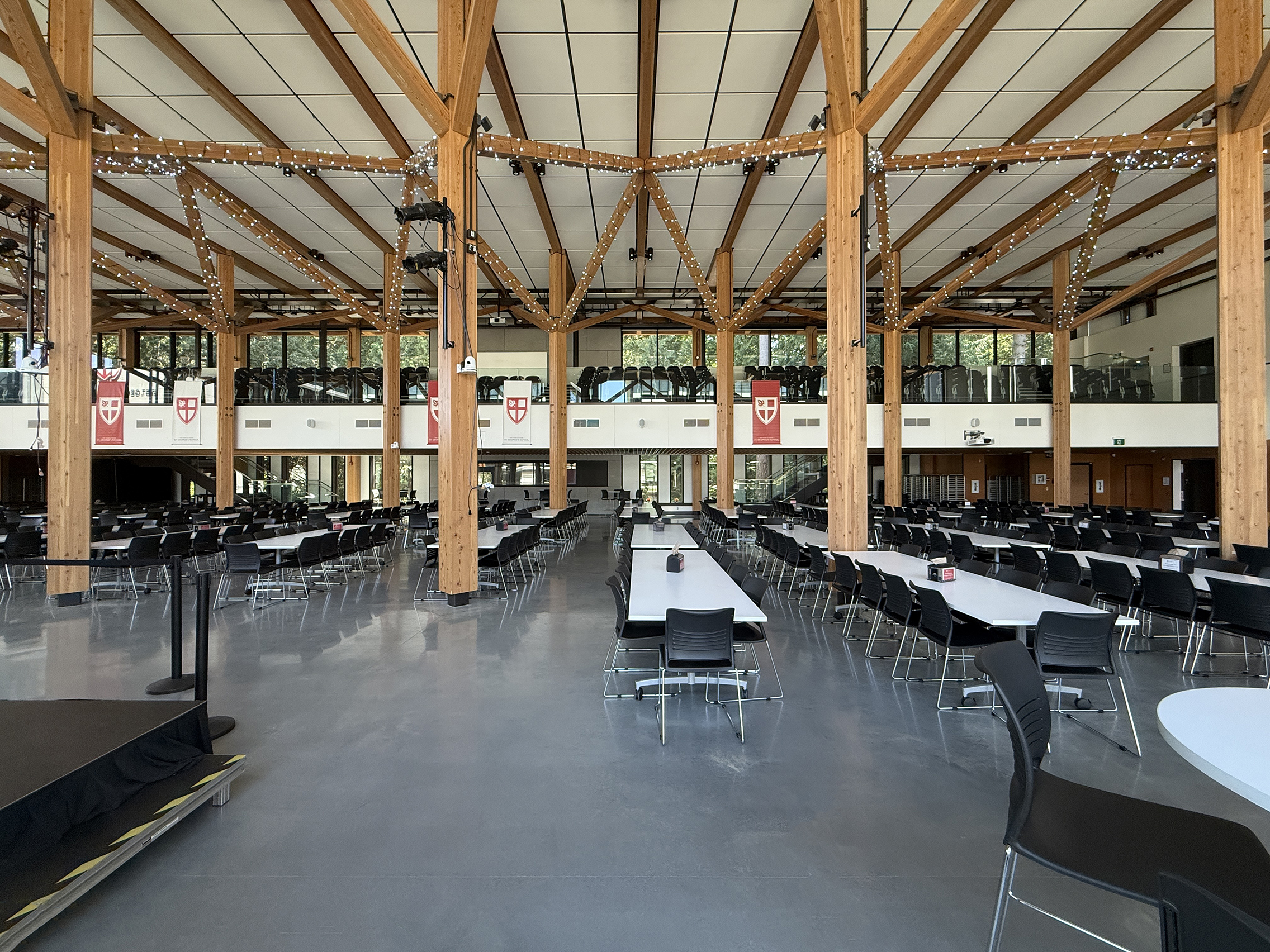
Dining Hall

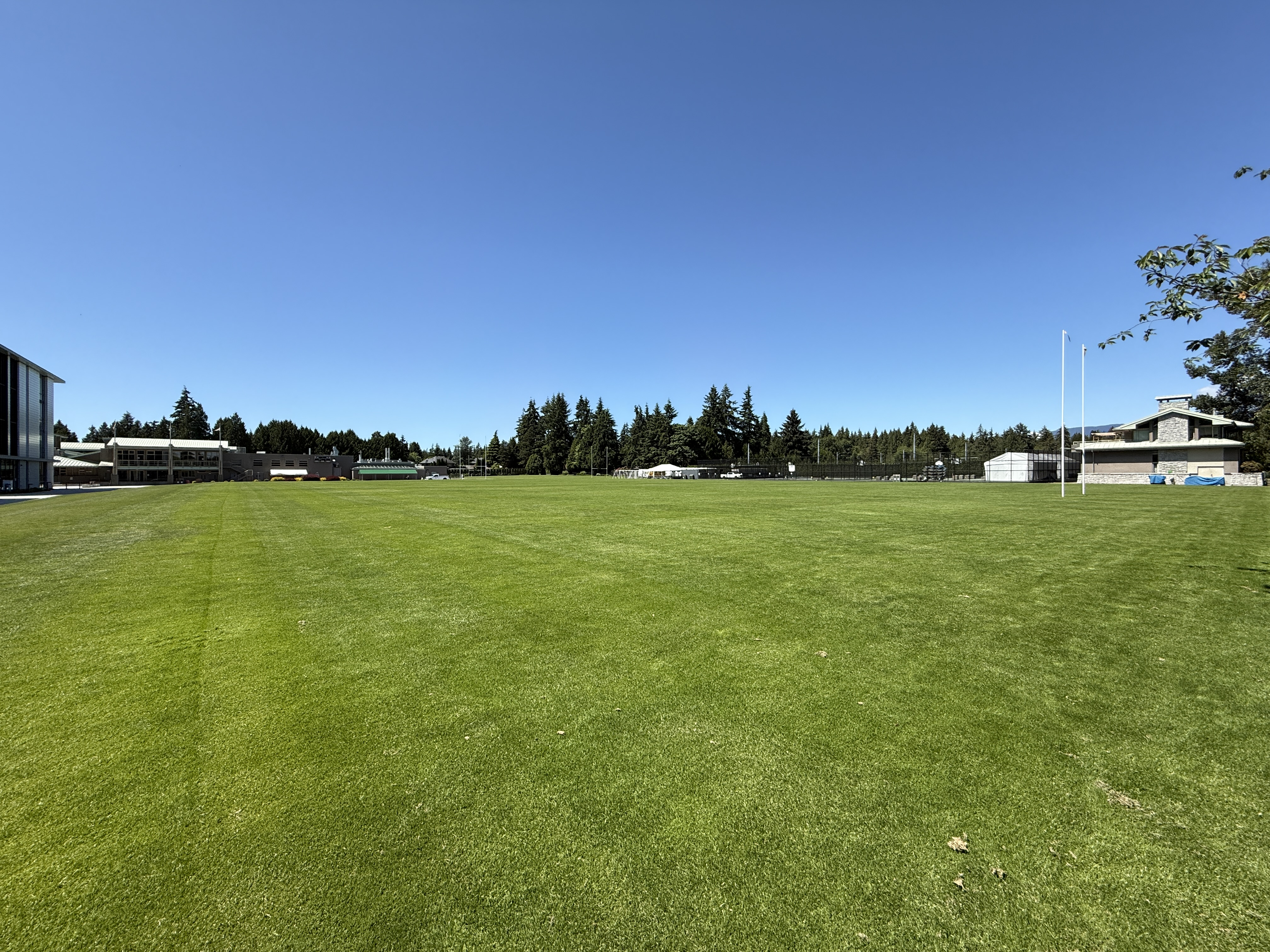
Mortensen Field

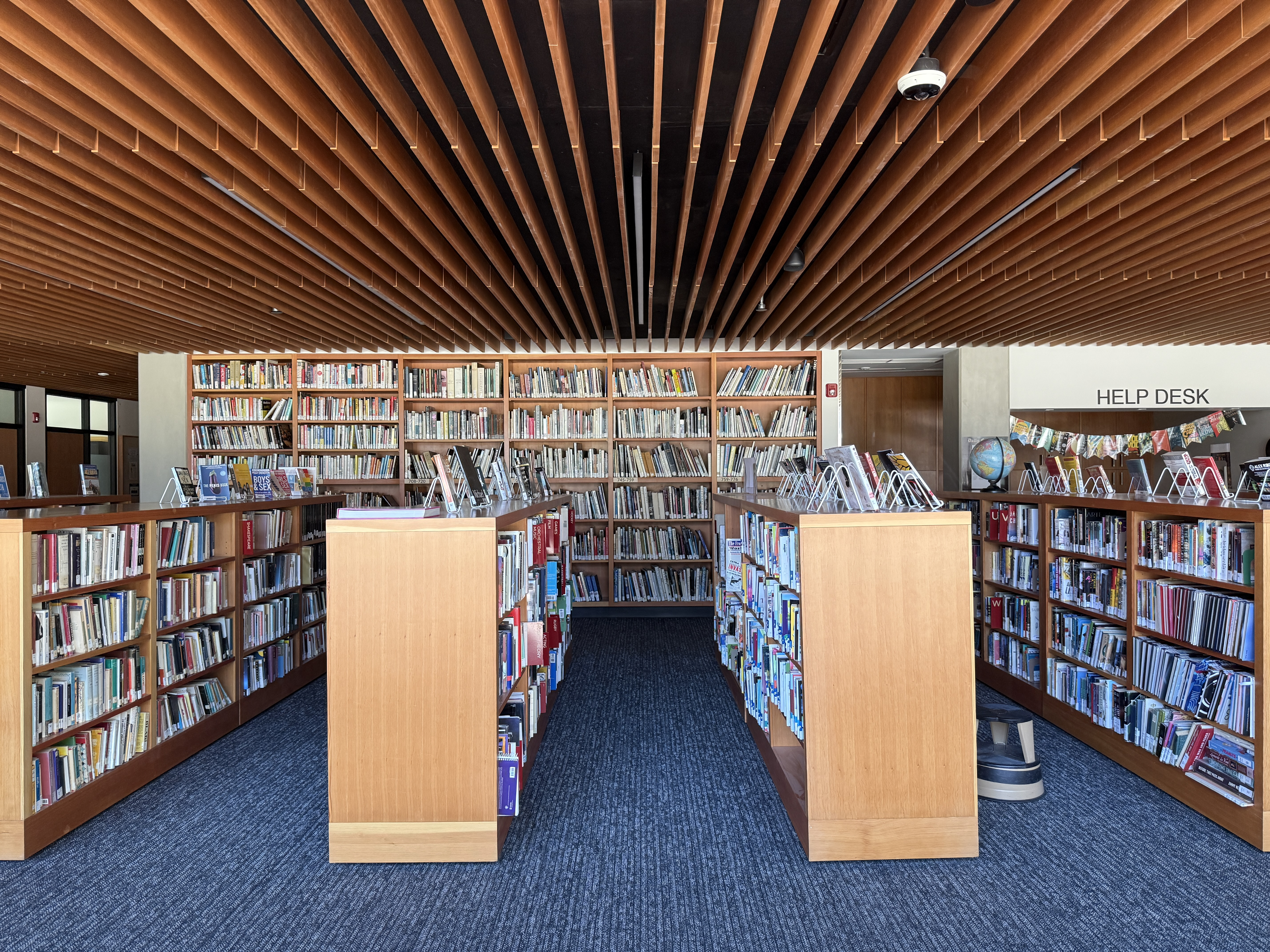
Library

== Athletics ==
Approximately 80% of students at St. George's School play in a competitive team. The school mandates that its boys select a recreational or competitive sport starting from Grade 8. Boys in Grades 11–12 may opt out for one term based on past games attendance.

St. George's has a wide variety of sports teams, including:

- Badminton
- Basketball
- Cricket
- Cross country running
- Curling
- Downhill Skiing
- Snowboarding
- Volleyball
- Field Hockey
- Golf
- Ice hockey
- Rugby
- Ultimate
- Rowing
- Soccer
- Squash
- Swimming
- Table Tennis
- Track and Field
- Triathlon
- Tennis
- Water polo
- Sport Climbing

== Outdoor education ==
There is also a mandatory outdoor education program implemented for students from grades 1-10. Students are required to participate in outdoor educational programs both in the junior school and the senior school. These activities range from half day trips (grade 1) to full, week-long excursions (grade 10). The junior experiences focus on an education aspect: students learn about First Nations peoples and about the environment. The senior trips involve more personal-based learning; activities in the wilderness such as hiking, kayaking and canoeing focus on leadership and interpersonal skills. There is also a focus on environmental care and education. In grade 10, students have the option of applying for the 'Discovery 10' cohort program. This program is limited to 20 students who participate in a modified Social Studies and PE program, focusing on First Nations history, environmental studies, and outdoor leadership. The students spend approximately 55 days of each school year out of class on outdoor-education trips. These trips include, hiking, canoeing, kayaking, rock-climbing and backcountry ski touring.

== Sexual abuse allegations ==
In April 2025, a notice of civil claim was filed in the B.C. Supreme Court by a plaintiff identified as N.C., alleging that Raymond Thomas Clavin, a former teacher and coach at St. George's School, groomed and sexually assaulted him beginning in 1986. A second civil claim was filed in June 2025 by a plaintiff identified as A.B., alleging similar abuse by Clavin between approximately 1988 and 1991. Both claims also name Vancouver College, the Roman Catholic Archbishop of Vancouver, and the estate of deceased priest Father John Kilty as defendants, and allege institutional negligence in failing to investigate or report Clavin.

Clavin was convicted in 1994 of two counts of sexual assault and one count of indecent assault related to students at Vancouver College.

== Notable alumni ==
| Year of graduation | Name | Description | Ref. |
|---|---|---|---|
| 1947 | Peter Bentley | Past president and CEO and current chairman of Canfor, past director and current honorary director of the Bank of Montreal, member of the Canadian Council of Chief Executives, chairman of Sierra Mountain Minerals, a director of the Vancouver General Hospital and University of British Columbia Hospital Foundation, past chancellor of the University of Northern British Columbia | |
| 1960s | Patrick Moore | A founding member of Greenpeace and former president of Greenpeace Canada | |
| 1972 | Peter Lam | Chairman of the Lai Sun Group and Media Asia Entertainment Group. Deputy chair of Lai Sun Garments and executive director of eSun Holdings and Crocodile Garments. | |
| 1976 | Arthur Griffiths | Former assistant to the chairman of the Vancouver Canucks. Owner of the Vancouver Canucks from 1988 to 1997. Led the initiative to build GM Place. Helped Vancouver secure the 2010 Winter Olympics bid. | |
| 1976 | John Weston | Former member of Parliament for West Vancouver—Sunshine Coast—Sea to Sky Country | |
| 1977 | Alan Best | Canadian filmmaker | |
| 1980 | Pat Palmer | Speedy winger for the Canadian national rugby team with 17 caps to his name. He represented Canada at both the 1987 and 1991 Rugby World Cups. | |
| 1999 | David Carter | Canadian field hockey Olympian | |
| 2000 | Jay Malinowski | Lead singer and co-founder of the reggae-pop band Bedouin Soundclash | |
| 2002 | Donovan Tildesley | Canadian Paralympic swimmer and flagbearer at the 2008 Paralympic Games in Beijing, China | |
| 2004 | Michael Wilkinson | Attended the London 2012 Summer Olympics as a rower for team Canada, participating in the men's four boat class | |
| 2006 and 2007 | Tom Howie and Jimmy Vallance | Canadian electronic rock-duo Bob Moses, and based in Brooklyn. A remix of their song "Tearing Me Up" by RAC won a Grammy Award for Best Remixed Recording, Non-Classical. | |
| 2007 | Conor Trainor | Canadian professional rugby player. Part of the Canada national rugby union team at the 2011 Rugby World Cup, where he became the first Canadian rugby player to score 2 tries against the New Zealand All Blacks. | |
| NA | Tablo | Lee Seon-woong, also known as Tablo (Hangul: 타블로), a South Korean-born Canadian rapper, record producer, songwriter, author, and entrepreneur | |
| NA | Nicholas Tse | Nicholas Tse (Tse Ting-fung), Chinese: 謝霆鋒, (born August 29, 1980), a Hong Kong actor, singer, songwriter, musician, entrepreneur, martial artist, and chef | |

== Arms ==
Coat of arms of St. George's School

Notes
Granted 15 September 2017.
Crest
Upon a grassy mount Proper the mounted figure of St. George vested of a tabard of the Arms and slaying a dragon Proper.
Escutcheon
Argent a cross Gules in the canton a maple leaf bendwise Vert all within a bordure Gules.
Motto
Sine Timore Aut Favore (Without Fear Or Favour)

== Notes ==
- The junior school campus (Convent of the Sacred Heart) is a Vancouver heritage site.
- St. George's "sister" schools are York House School in Vancouver; St. Margaret's School in Victoria, British Columbia; and Crofton House School, also in Vancouver.
- The school has an amicable rivalry with Vancouver College; for example, the Saints' and VC rowing crews compete annually in a regatta in April, the "Saints College Boat Race", and also in an annual Saints-College basketball series.
- The school is known for its reputation as one of the preeminent schools in Canada, with highly selective admissions standards.
